= 2003–04 Biathlon World Cup =

Biathlon competition

2003–04 World Cup
Discipline	Men	Women
Overall	(France) Raphaël Poirée	(Norway) Liv Grete Poirée
Nations Cup	Norway	Russia
Individual	(France) Raphaël Poirée	(Russia) Olga Pyleva
Sprint	(France) Raphaël Poirée	(Norway) Liv Grete Poirée
Pursuit	(France) Raphaël Poirée	(Norway) Liv Grete Poirée
Mass start	(France) Raphaël Poirée	(Norway) Liv Grete Poirée
Relay	Norway	Norway

Competition

The 2003–04 Biathlon World Cup was a multi-race tournament over a season of biathlon, organised by the International Biathlon Union. The Biathlon World Championships 2004 were part of the Biathlon World Cup.

The men's overall World Cup was won by Raphaël Poirée, while Liv Grete Skjelbreid Poirée of Norway claimed the women's overall World Cup.

== Calendar ==
Below is the World Cup calendar for the 2003–04 season.

Location	Date	Individual	Sprint	Pursuit	Mass start	Relay	Mixed relay
(Finland) Kontiolahti	4–7 December		●	●		●	
(Austria) Hochfilzen	11–14 December		●	●		●	
(Slovakia) Osrblie	18–21 December	●	●	●			
(Slovenia) Pokljuka	7–11 January		●	●	●		
(Germany) Ruhpolding	14–18 January		●	●		●	
(Italy) Antholz	21–25 January	●	●		●		
(Germany) Oberhof	7–15 February	●	●	●	●	●	
(United States) Lake Placid	27–29 February		●	●			
(United States) Fort Kent	3–6 March		●	●	●		
(Norway) Holmenkollen	16–19 March		●	●			
Total		3	10	9	4	4	0

== World Cup Podium ==
=== Men ===
Stage	Date	Place	Discipline	Winner	Second	Third	Yellow bib (After competition)	Det.
1	4 December 2003	(Finland) Kontiolahti	10 km Sprint	(Norway) Ole Einar Bjørndalen	(Norway) Halvard Hanevold	(Norway) Frode Andresen	(Norway) Ole Einar Bjørndalen	Detail
1	7 December 2003	(Finland) Kontiolahti	12.5 km Pursuit	(Norway) Ole Einar Bjørndalen	(France) Raphaël Poirée	(Russia) Sergei Rozhkov	(Norway) Ole Einar Bjørndalen	Detail
2	11 December 2003	(Austria) Hochfilzen	10 km Sprint	(Norway) Lars Berger	(Belarus) Vladimir Drachev	(Norway) Halvard Hanevold	(Norway) Ole Einar Bjørndalen	Detail
2	14 December 2003	(Austria) Hochfilzen	12.5 km Pursuit	(Norway) Ole Einar Bjørndalen	(Belarus) Vladimir Drachev	(Norway) Stian Eckhoff	(Norway) Ole Einar Bjørndalen	Detail
3	18 December 2003	(Slovakia) Brezno-Osrblie	20 km Individual	(France) Raphaël Poirée	(Germany) Ricco Groß	(Germany) Peter Sendel	(France) Raphaël Poirée	Detail
3	19 December 2003	(Slovakia) Brezno-Osrblie	10 km Sprint	(Russia) Sergei Rozhkov	(Austria) Ludwig Gredler	(Russia) Sergei Tchepikov	(Russia) Sergei Rozhkov	Detail
3	21 December 2003	(Slovakia) Brezno-Osrblie	12.5 km Pursuit	(France) Raphaël Poirée	(Germany) Peter Sendel	(Slovakia) Pavol Hurajt	(Russia) Sergei Rozhkov	Detail
4	8 January 2004	(Slovenia) Pokljuka	10 km Sprint	(France) Raphaël Poirée	(Norway) Ole Einar Bjørndalen	(Belarus) Vladimir Drachev	(France) Raphaël Poirée	Detail
4	10 January 2004	(Slovenia) Pokljuka	12.5 km Pursuit	(Norway) Ole Einar Bjørndalen	(Russia) Nikolay Kruglov	(Russia) Sergei Tchepikov	(France) Raphaël Poirée	Detail
4	11 January 2004	(Slovenia) Pokljuka	15 km Mass Start	(Norway) Halvard Hanevold	(Norway) Ole Einar Bjørndalen	(Germany) Michael Greis	(France) Raphaël Poirée	Detail
5	17 January 2004	(Germany) Ruhpolding	10 km Sprint	(Norway) Halvard Hanevold	(Norway) Ole Einar Bjørndalen	(Norway) Lars Berger	(France) Raphaël Poirée	Detail
5	18 January 2004	(Germany) Ruhpolding	12.5 km Pursuit	(Norway) Ole Einar Bjørndalen	(Norway) Lars Berger	(Norway) Halvard Hanevold	(Norway) Ole Einar Bjørndalen	Detail
6	22 January 2004	(Italy) Antholz-Anterselva	20 km Individual	(Germany) Sven Fischer	(France) Raphaël Poirée	(Germany) Ricco Groß	(Norway) Ole Einar Bjørndalen	Detail
6	24 January 2004	(Italy) Antholz-Anterselva	10 km Sprint	(Russia) Sergei Tchepikov	(Slovenia) Janez Marič	(Germany) Ricco Groß	(Norway) Ole Einar Bjørndalen	Detail
6	25 January 2004	(Italy) Antholz-Anterselva	15 km Mass Start	(France) Raphaël Poirée	(Norway) Ole Einar Bjørndalen	(Germany) Ricco Groß	(Norway) Ole Einar Bjørndalen	Detail
WC	7 February 2004	(Germany) Oberhof	10 km Sprint	(France) Raphaël Poirée	(Germany) Ricco Groß	(Norway) Ole Einar Bjørndalen	(Norway) Ole Einar Bjørndalen	Detail
WC	8 February 2004	(Germany) Oberhof	12.5 km Pursuit	(Germany) Ricco Groß	(France) Raphaël Poirée	(Norway) Ole Einar Bjørndalen	(Norway) Ole Einar Bjørndalen	Detail
WC	12 February 2004	(Germany) Oberhof	20 km Individual	(France) Raphaël Poirée	(Poland) Tomasz Sikora	(Norway) Ole Einar Bjørndalen	(Norway) Ole Einar Bjørndalen	Detail
WC	15 February 2004	(Germany) Oberhof	15 km Mass Start	(France) Raphaël Poirée	(Norway) Lars Berger	(Russia) Sergei Konovalov	(France) Raphaël Poirée	Detail
7	27 February 2004	(United States) Lake Placid	10 km Sprint	(Norway) Lars Berger	(France) Raphaël Poirée	(Slovenia) Janez Marič	(France) Raphaël Poirée	Detail
7	29 February 2004	(United States) Lake Placid	12.5 km Pursuit	(France) Raphaël Poirée	(Russia) Nikolay Kruglov	(Germany) Ricco Groß	(France) Raphaël Poirée	Detail
8	4 March 2004	(United States) Fort Kent	10 km Sprint	(France) Raphaël Poirée	(Germany) Michael Greis	(Slovakia) Pavol Hurajt	(France) Raphaël Poirée	Detail
8	5 March 2004	(United States) Fort Kent	12.5 km Pursuit	(France) Raphaël Poirée	(Sweden) Carl Johan Bergman	(Russia) Nikolay Kruglov	(France) Raphaël Poirée	Detail
8	6 March 2004	(United States) Fort Kent	15 km Mass Start	(Germany) Sven Fischer	(Norway) Ole Einar Bjørndalen	(Russia) Sergei Rozhkov	(France) Raphaël Poirée	Detail
9	11 March 2004	(Norway) Oslo Holmenkollen	10 km Sprint	(Norway) Lars Berger	(Norway) Frode Andresen	(Poland) Tomasz Sikora	(France) Raphaël Poirée	Detail
9	13 March 2004	(Norway) Oslo Holmenkollen	12.5 km Pursuit	(France) Raphaël Poirée	(Poland) Tomasz Sikora	(Belarus) Vladimir Drachev	(France) Raphaël Poirée	Detail

=== Women ===
Stage	Date	Place	Discipline	Winner	Second	Third	Yellow bib (After competition)	Det.
1	4 December 2003	(Finland) Kontiolahti	7.5 km Sprint	(France) Sandrine Bailly	(Norway) Liv Grete Poirée	(Germany) Uschi Disl	(France) Sandrine Bailly	Detail
1	7 December 2003	(Finland) Kontiolahti	10 km Pursuit	(Norway) Liv Grete Poirée	(Germany) Kati Wilhelm	(Germany) Uschi Disl	(Norway) Liv Grete Poirée	Detail
2	11 December 2003	(Austria) Hochfilzen	7.5 km Sprint	(Belarus) Olena Zubrilova	(Norway) Gro Marit Istad-Kristiansen	(Norway) Liv Grete Poirée	(Norway) Liv Grete Poirée	Detail
2	14 December 2003	(Austria) Hochfilzen	10 km Pursuit	(France) Sandrine Bailly	(Germany) Martina Glagow	(Russia) Olga Zaitseva	(Norway) Liv Grete Poirée	Detail
3	18 December 2003	(Slovakia) Brezno-Osrblie	15 km Individual	(Germany) Martina Glagow	(Norway) Liv Grete Poirée	(Russia) Olga Pyleva	(Norway) Liv Grete Poirée	Detail
3	20 December 2003	(Slovakia) Brezno-Osrblie	7.5 km Sprint	(France) Sandrine Bailly	(Germany) Katja Beer	(Germany) Martina Glagow	(France) Sandrine Bailly	Detail
3	21 December 2003	(Slovakia) Brezno-Osrblie	10 km Pursuit	(France) Sandrine Bailly	(Russia) Olga Pyleva	(Germany) Katrin Apel	(France) Sandrine Bailly	Detail
4	7 January 2004	(Slovenia) Pokljuka	7.5 km Sprint	(Norway) Liv Grete Poirée	(Germany) Uschi Disl	(France) Sandrine Bailly	(France) Sandrine Bailly	Detail
4	9 January 2004	(Slovenia) Pokljuka	10 km Pursuit	(Germany) Uschi Disl	(France) Sandrine Bailly	(Russia) Olga Pyleva	(France) Sandrine Bailly	Detail
4	11 January 2004	(Slovenia) Pokljuka	12.5 km Mass Start	(Russia) Anna Bogaliy	(Norway) Liv Grete Poirée	(Germany) Uschi Disl	(France) Sandrine Bailly	Detail
5	16 January 2004	(Germany) Ruhpolding	7.5 km Sprint	(Norway) Liv Grete Poirée	(Russia) Svetlana Ishmouratova	(Germany) Martina Glagow	(Norway) Liv Grete Poirée	Detail
5	18 January 2004	(Germany) Ruhpolding	10 km Pursuit	(Norway) Liv Grete Poirée	(Russia) Svetlana Ishmouratova	(Russia) Olga Pyleva	(Norway) Liv Grete Poirée	Detail
6	21 January 2004	(Italy) Antholz-Anterselva	15 km Individual	(Russia) Anna Bogaliy	(Russia) Svetlana Ishmouratova	(Slovakia) Anna Murínová	(Norway) Liv Grete Poirée	Detail
6	23 January 2004	(Italy) Antholz-Anterselva	7.5 km Sprint	(Russia) Natalia Guseva	(Czech Republic) Kateřina Holubcová	(Russia) Svetlana Ishmouratova	(Norway) Liv Grete Poirée	Detail
6	25 January 2004	(Italy) Antholz-Anterselva	12.5 km Mass Start	(Norway) Linda Tjørhom	(Russia) Natalia Guseva	(Russia) Anna Bogaliy	(Norway) Liv Grete Poirée	Detail
WC	7 February 2004	(Germany) Oberhof	7.5 km Sprint	(Norway) Liv Grete Poirée	(Russia) Anna Bogaliy	(Germany) Martina Glagow	(Norway) Liv Grete Poirée	Detail
WC	8 February 2004	(Germany) Oberhof	10 km Pursuit	(Norway) Liv Grete Poirée	(Germany) Martina Glagow	(Russia) Anna Bogaliy	(Norway) Liv Grete Poirée	Detail
WC	10 February 2004	(Germany) Oberhof	15 km Individual	(Russia) Olga Pyleva	(Russia) Albina Akhatova	(Ukraine) Olena Petrova	(Norway) Liv Grete Poirée	Detail
WC	14 February 2004	(Germany) Oberhof	12.5 km Mass Start	(Norway) Liv Grete Poirée	(Germany) Katrin Apel	(France) Sandrine Bailly	(Norway) Liv Grete Poirée	Detail
7	27 February 2004	(United States) Lake Placid	7.5 km Sprint	(Russia) Olga Pyleva	(Germany) Kati Wilhelm	(Russia) Anna Bogaliy	(Norway) Liv Grete Poirée	Detail
7	28 February 2004	(United States) Lake Placid	10 km Pursuit	(Russia) Olga Pyleva	(Russia) Anna Bogaliy	(France) Sandrine Bailly	(Norway) Liv Grete Poirée	Detail
8	3 March 2004	(United States) Fort Kent	7.5 km Sprint	(Germany) Uschi Disl	(Norway) Liv Grete Poirée	(Russia) Olga Zaitseva	(Norway) Liv Grete Poirée	Detail
8	5 March 2004	(United States) Fort Kent	10 km Pursuit	(Germany) Uschi Disl	(Norway) Liv Grete Poirée	(Germany) Kati Wilhelm	(Norway) Liv Grete Poirée	Detail
8	6 March 2004	(United States) Fort Kent	12.5 km Mass Start	(Russia) Olga Pyleva	(Russia) Anna Bogaliy	(Norway) Liv Grete Poirée	(Norway) Liv Grete Poirée	Detail
9	11 March 2004	(Norway) Oslo Holmenkollen	7.5 km Sprint	(Russia) Olga Pyleva	(Germany) Kati Wilhelm	(Russia) Svetlana Ishmouratova	(Norway) Liv Grete Poirée	Detail
9	13 March 2004	(Norway) Oslo Holmenkollen	10 km Pursuit	(Russia) Olga Pyleva	(Bulgaria) Ekaterina Dafovska	(Norway) Liv Grete Poirée	(Norway) Liv Grete Poirée	Detail

=== Men's team ===
Event	Date	Place	Discipline	Winner	Second	Third
1	6 December 2003	(Finland) Kontiolahti	4x7.5 km Relay	Germany Peter Sendel; Sven Fischer; Ricco Gross; Frank Luck	France Ferréol Cannard; Vincent Defrasne; Julien Robert; Raphael Poiree	Sweden Carl Johan Bergman; Jakob Börjesson; Mattias Nilsson; Björn Ferry
2	13 December 2003	(Austria) Hochfilzen	4x7.5 km Relay	Norway Stian Eckhoff; Lars Berger; Halvard Hanevold; Ole Einar Bjørndalen	Belarus Alexandr Syman; Vladimir Drachev; Rustam Valiullin; Oleg Ryzhenkov	France Ferréol Cannard; Vincent Defrasne; Julien Robert; Raphael Poiree
5	15 January 2004	(Germany) Ruhpolding	4x7.5 km Relay	Belarus Alexandr Syman; Vladimir Drachev; Rustam Valiullin; Oleg Ryzhenkov	Norway Egil Gjelland; Lars Berger; Frode Andresen; Halvard Hanevold	Russia Filipp Shulman; Sergei Konovalov; Sergei Rozhkov; Sergei Tchepikov
WC	13 February 2004	(Germany) Oberhof	4x7.5 km Relay	Germany Frank Luck; Ricco Gross; Sven Fischer; Michael Greis	Norway Halvard Hanevold; Lars Berger; Egil Gjelland; Ole Einar Bjørndalen	France Ferréol Cannard; Vincent Defrasne; Julien Robert; Raphael Poiree

=== Women's team ===
Event	Date	Place	Discipline	Winner	Second	Third
1	5 December 2003	(Finland) Kontiolahti	4x6 km Relay	Norway Liv-Kjersti Eikeland; Linda Tjorhom; Gunn Margit Andreassen; Liv Grete Poiree	Russia Albina Akhatova; Olga Zaitseva; Svetlana Ishmouratova; Olga Pyleva	France Corinne Niogret; Christelle Gros; Julie Carraz; Sandrine Bailly
2	12 December 2003	(Austria) Hochfilzen	4x6 km Relay	Belarus Ekaterina Ivanova; Ksenia Zikounkova; Olga Nazarova; Olena Zubrilova	Germany Martina Glagow; Katrin Apel; Katja Beer; Kati Wilhelm	France Corinne Niogret; Christelle Gros; Julie Carraz; Sandrine Bailly
5	14 January 2004	(Germany) Ruhpolding	4x6 km Relay	Germany Simone Denkinger; Uschi Disl; Katrin Apel; Kati Wilhelm	Russia Olga Pyleva; Svetlana Ishmouratova; Anna Bogaliy; Albina Akhatova	Norway Linda Tjorhom; Ann-Elen Skjelbreid; Liv Grete Poiree; Gunn Margit Andreassen
WC	12 February 2004	(Germany) Oberhof	4x6 km Relay	Norway Linda Tjorhom; Gro Marit Istad-Kristiansen; Gunn Margit Andreassen; Liv Grete Poiree	Russia Olga Pyleva; Svetlana Ishmouratova; Anna Bogaliy-Titovets; Albina Akhatova	Germany Martina Glagow; Katrin Apel; Simone Denkinger; Kati Wilhelm

== Standings: Men ==
=== Overall ===
Pos.		Points
1.	(France) Raphaël Poirée	1010
2.	(Norway) Ole Einar Bjørndalen	901
3.	(Germany) Ricco Groß	769
4.	(Norway) Halvard Hanevold	688
5.	(Norway) Lars Berger	589

- Final standings after 26 races.

=== Individual ===
Pos.		Points
1.	(France) Raphaël Poirée	146
2.	(Germany) Ricco Groß	129
3.	(Poland) Tomasz Sikora	114
4.	(Germany) Sven Fischer	84
5.	(Germany) Peter Sendel	77

- Final standings after 3 races.

=== Sprint ===
Pos.		Points
1.	(France) Raphaël Poirée	358
2.	(Norway) Ole Einar Bjørndalen	341
3.	(Norway) Lars Berger	268
4.	(Norway) Halvard Hanevold	260
5.	(Germany) Ricco Groß	255

- Final standings after 10 races.

=== Pursuit ===
Pos.		Points
1.	(France) Raphaël Poirée	331
2.	(Norway) Ole Einar Bjørndalen	315
3.	(Germany) Ricco Groß	277
4.	(Norway) Halvard Hanevold	254
5.	(Norway) Stian Eckhoff	219

- Final standings after 9 races.

=== Mass Start ===
Pos.		Points
1.	(France) Raphaël Poirée	140
2.	(Norway) Ole Einar Bjørndalen	138
3.	(Norway) Halvard Hanevold	121
4.	(Germany) Sven Fischer	106
5.	(Germany) Ricco Groß	103

- Final standings after 4 races.

=== Relay ===
Pos.		Points
1.	Norway	176
2.	Germany	174
3.	France	172
4.	Russia	160
5.	Belarus	156

- Final standings after 4 races.

=== Nation ===
Pos.		Points
1.	Norway	4434
2.	Germany	4287
3.	Russia	4185
4.	France	4097
5.	Belarus	3817

- Final standings after 17 races.

== Standings: Women ==
=== Overall ===
Pos.		Points
1.	(Norway) Liv Grete Poirée	955
2.	(Russia) Olga Pyleva	860
3.	(France) Sandrine Bailly	788
4.	(Germany) Uschi Disl	733
5.	(Russia) Anna Bogaliy	687

- Final standings after 26 races.

=== Individual ===
Pos.		Points
1.	(Russia) Olga Pyleva	130
2.	(Russia) Anna Bogaliy	110
3.	(Germany) Martina Glagow	104
4.	(Norway) Liv Grete Poirée	90
5.	(Russia) Albina Akhatova	86

- Final standings after 3 races.

=== Sprint ===
Pos.		Points
1.	(Norway) Liv Grete Poirée	370
2.	(France) Sandrine Bailly	328
3.	(Russia) Olga Pyleva	304
4.	(Germany) Martina Glagow	267
5.	(Germany) Katrin Apel	266

- Final standings after 10 races.

=== Pursuit ===
Pos.		Points
1.	(Norway) Liv Grete Poirée	327
2.	(Russia) Olga Pyleva	324
3.	(France) Sandrine Bailly	293
4.	(Germany) Uschi Disl	288
5.	(Germany) Katrin Apel	250

- Final standings after 9 races.

=== Mass Start ===
Pos.		Points
1.	(Norway) Liv Grete Poirée	139
2.	(Russia) Anna Bogaliy	139
3.	(Germany) Uschi Disl	115
4.	(France) Sandrine Bailly	104
5.	(Russia) Olga Pyleva	102

- Final standings after 4 races.

=== Relay ===
Pos.		Points
1.	Norway	180
2.	Russia	178
3.	Germany	176
4.	France	163
5.	Italy	129

- Final standings after 4 races.

=== Nation ===
Pos.		Points
1.	Russia	4490
2.	Germany	4455
3.	Norway	4116
4.	France	3884
5.	Belarus	3865

- Final standings after 17 races.

== Medal table ==
Rank	Nation	Gold	Silver	Bronze	Total
1	Norway	21	16	13	50
2	France	15	6	7	28
3	Russia	11	14	17	42
4	Germany	10	14	13	37
5	Belarus	3	3	3	9
6	Poland	0	2	1	3
7	Slovenia	0	1	1	2
7	Sweden	0	1	1	2
9	Austria	0	1	0	1
9	Bulgaria	0	1	0	1
9	Czech Republic	0	1	0	1
12	Slovakia	0	0	3	3
13	Ukraine	0	0	1	1
Totals (13 entries)		60	60	60	180

== Achievements ==
Victory in this World Cup (all-time number of victories in parentheses)

Men

- Raphaël Poirée (FRA), 11 (34) first places
- Ole Einar Bjørndalen (NOR), 5 (43) first places
- Lars Berger (NOR), 3 (3) first places
- Sven Fischer (GER), 2 (25) first places
- Halvard Hanevold (NOR), 2 (8) first places
- Ricco Groß (GER), 1 (8) first place
- Sergei Tchepikov (RUS), 1 (6) first place
- Sergei Rozhkov (RUS), 1 (3) first place

Women

- Liv Grete Poirée (NOR), 7 (20) first places
- Olga Pyleva (RUS), 6 (8) first places
- Sandrine Bailly (FRA), 4 (7) first places
- Uschi Disl (GER), 3 (24) first places
- Anna Bogaliy (RUS), 2 (2) first places
- Olena Zubrilova (BLR), 1 (19) first place
- Martina Glagow (GER), 1 (5) first place
- Linda Tjørhom (NOR), 1 (2) first place
- Natalia Guseva (RUS), 1 (1) first place

== Retirements ==
The following notable biathletes retired after the 2003–04 season:

- Frank Luck (GER)
- Peter Sendel (GER)
- Patrick Favre (ITA)
- Marko Dolenc (SLO)
- Ann Elen Skjelbreid (NOR)
- Iryna Merkushina (UKR)
