= 2001–02 Biathlon World Cup =

Biathlon competition

2001–02 World Cup
| Discipline | Men | Women |
| Overall | (France) Raphaël Poirée | (Sweden) Magdalena Forsberg |
| Nations Cup | Germany | Germany |
| Individual | (Germany) Frank Luck | (Sweden) Magdalena Forsberg |
| Sprint | (Germany) Sven Fischer | (Sweden) Magdalena Forsberg |
| Pursuit | (France) Raphaël Poirée | (Sweden) Magdalena Forsberg |
| Mass start | (Russia) Viktor Maigourov | (Sweden) Magdalena Forsberg |
| Relay | Norway | Germany |

Competition

The 2001–02 Biathlon World Cup was a multi-race tournament over a season of biathlon, organised by the International Biathlon Union. The season started on 6 December 2001 in Hochfilzen, Austria, and ended on 24 March 2002 in Holmenkollen, Norway. It was the 25th season of the Biathlon World Cup.

== Calendar ==
Below is the IBU World Cup calendar for the 2001–02 season.

| Location | Date | Individual | Sprint | Pursuit | Mass start | Relay | Details |
|---|---|---|---|---|---|---|---|
| (Austria) Hochfilzen | 6–9 December | | ● | ● | | ● | details |
| (Slovenia) Pokljuka | 12–16 December | ● | | ● | | ● | details |
| (Slovakia) Brezno-Osrblie | 19–22 December | ● | ● | | ● | | details |
| (Germany) Oberhof | 9–13 January | | ● | ● | ● | | details |
| (Germany) Ruhpolding | 16–20 January | | ● | ● | | ● | details |
| (Italy) Antholz-Anterselva | 23–27 January | ● | | ● | | ● | details |
| (United States) Salt Lake City | 9–20 February | ● | ● | ● | | ● | Winter Olympics |
| (Sweden) Östersund | 9–10 March | | ● | ● | | | details |
| (Finland) Lahti | 14–17 March | | ● | ● | | ● | details |
| (Norway) Holmenkollen | 21–23 March | | ● | ● | ● | | details |
| Total | | 4 | 8 | 9 | 3 | 6 | |

== World Cup Podium ==
=== Men ===
| Stage | Date | Place | Discipline | Winner | Second | Third | Yellow bib (After competition) | Det. |
|---|---|---|---|---|---|---|---|---|
| 1 | 6 December 2001 | (Austria) Hochfilzen | 10 km Sprint | (Norway) Ole Einar Bjørndalen | (Finland) Vesa Hietalahti | (Germany) Frank Luck | (Norway) Ole Einar Bjørndalen | Detail |
| 1 | 9 December 2001 | (Austria) Hochfilzen | 12.5 km Pursuit | (Norway) Ole Einar Bjørndalen | (Germany) Frank Luck | (Germany) Ricco Groß | (Norway) Ole Einar Bjørndalen | Detail |
| 2 | 13 December 2001 | (Slovenia) Pokljuka | 20 km Individual | (Russia) Pavel Rostovtsev | (Latvia) Ilmārs Bricis | (France) Vincent Defrasne | (Russia) Pavel Rostovtsev | Detail |
| 2 | 16 December 2001 | (Slovenia) Pokljuka | 12.5 km Pursuit | (France) Raphaël Poirée | (Russia) Pavel Rostovtsev | (Norway) Halvard Hanevold | (Russia) Pavel Rostovtsev | Detail |
| 3 | 19 December 2001 | (Slovakia) Brezno-Osrblie | 20 km Individual | (Germany) Frank Luck | (Germany) Sven Fischer | (Russia) Sergei Rozhkov | (Germany) Frank Luck | Detail |
| 3 | 21 December 2001 | (Slovakia) Brezno-Osrblie | 10 km Sprint | (Austria) Christoph Sumann | (Sweden) Henrik Forsberg | (Ukraine) Andriy Deryzemlya | (Germany) Frank Luck | Detail |
| 3 | 22 December 2001 | (Slovakia) Brezno-Osrblie | 15 km Mass Start | (Finland) Vesa Hietalahti | (Germany) Alexander Wolf | (Ukraine) Vyacheslav Derkach | (Germany) Frank Luck | Detail |
| 4 | 9 January 2002 | (Germany) Oberhof | 10 km Sprint | (Russia) Pavel Rostovtsev | (Germany) Sven Fischer | (Finland) Vesa Hietalahti | (Russia) Pavel Rostovtsev | Detail |
| 4 | 11 January 2002 | (Germany) Oberhof | 12.5 km Pursuit | (Russia) Pavel Rostovtsev | (France) Raphaël Poirée | (Germany) Sven Fischer | (Russia) Pavel Rostovtsev | Detail |
| 4 | 12 January 2002 | (Germany) Oberhof | 15 km Mass Start | (France) Raphaël Poirée | (France) Vincent Defrasne | (Russia) Viktor Maigourov | (Russia) Pavel Rostovtsev | Detail |
| 5 | 18 January 2002 | (Germany) Ruhpolding | 10 km Sprint | (France) Raphaël Poirée | (Germany) Michael Greis | (Norway) Frode Andresen | (Russia) Pavel Rostovtsev | Detail |
| 5 | 20 January 2002 | (Germany) Ruhpolding | 12.5 km Pursuit | (Germany) Sven Fischer | (Germany) Frank Luck | (Russia) Pavel Rostovtsev | (Russia) Pavel Rostovtsev | Detail |
| 6 | 24 January 2002 | (Italy) Antholz-Anterselva | 20 km Individual | (Austria) Daniel Mesotitsch | (Norway) Ole Einar Bjørndalen | (Russia) Michail Kochkin | (Russia) Pavel Rostovtsev | Detail |
| 6 | 27 January 2002 | (Italy) Antholz-Anterselva | 12.5 km Pursuit | (France) Raphaël Poirée | (Norway) Ole Einar Bjørndalen | (Austria) Daniel Mesotitsch | (France) Raphaël Poirée | Detail |
| OG | 11 February 2002 | (United States) Salt Lake City | 20 km Individual | (Norway) Ole Einar Bjørndalen | (Germany) Frank Luck | (Russia) Viktor Maigourov | (France) Raphaël Poirée | Detail |
| OG | 13 February 2002 | (United States) Salt Lake City | 10 km Sprint | (Norway) Ole Einar Bjørndalen | (Germany) Sven Fischer | (Austria) Wolfgang Perner | (France) Raphaël Poirée | Detail |
| OG | 16 February 2002 | (United States) Salt Lake City | 12.5 km Pursuit | (Norway) Ole Einar Bjørndalen | (France) Raphaël Poirée | (Germany) Ricco Groß | (France) Raphaël Poirée | Detail |
| 7 | 9 March 2002 | (Sweden) Östersund | 10 km Sprint | (Germany) Sven Fischer | (Germany) Michael Greis | (Norway) Ole Einar Bjørndalen | (Russia) Pavel Rostovtsev | Detail |
| 7 | 10 March 2002 | (Sweden) Östersund | 12.5 km Pursuit | (Russia) Pavel Rostovtsev | (Germany) Sven Fischer | (Norway) Ole Einar Bjørndalen | (Russia) Pavel Rostovtsev | Detail |
| 8 | 14 March 2002 | (Finland) Lahti | 10 km Sprint | (France) Raphaël Poirée | (Norway) Frode Andresen | (Germany) Sven Fischer | (Russia) Pavel Rostovtsev | Detail |
| 8 | 17 March 2002 | (Finland) Lahti | 12.5 km Pursuit | (France) Raphaël Poirée | (Norway) Frode Andresen | (Germany) Sven Fischer | (France) Raphaël Poirée | Detail |
| 9 | 21 March 2002 | (Norway) Oslo Holmenkollen | 10 km Sprint | (Germany) Frank Luck | (Germany) Sven Fischer | (Finland) Vesa Hietalahti | (France) Raphaël Poirée | Detail |
| 9 | 23 March 2002 | (Norway) Oslo Holmenkollen | 12.5 km Pursuit | (Germany) Sven Fischer | (Norway) Frode Andresen | (France) Raphaël Poirée | (France) Raphaël Poirée | Detail |
| WC | 24 March 2002 | (Norway) Oslo Holmenkollen | 15 km Mass Start | (France) Raphaël Poirée | (Germany) Sven Fischer | (Norway) Frode Andresen | (France) Raphaël Poirée | Detail |

=== Women ===
| Stage | Date | Place | Discipline | Winner | Second | Third | Yellow bib (After competition) | Det. |
|---|---|---|---|---|---|---|---|---|
| 1 | 6 December 2001 | (Austria) Hochfilzen | 7.5 km Sprint | (Sweden) Magdalena Forsberg | (Germany) Andrea Henkel | (Germany) Uschi Disl (Germany) Martina Zellner | (Sweden) Magdalena Forsberg | Detail |
| 1 | 9 December 2001 | (Austria) Hochfilzen | 10 km Pursuit | (Sweden) Magdalena Forsberg | (Ukraine) Olena Zubrilova | (Germany) Uschi Disl | (Sweden) Magdalena Forsberg | Detail |
| 2 | 12 December 2001 | (Slovenia) Pokljuka | 15 km Individual | (Sweden) Magdalena Forsberg | (Germany) Uschi Disl | (Germany) Andrea Henkel | (Sweden) Magdalena Forsberg | Detail |
| 2 | 16 December 2001 | (Slovenia) Pokljuka | 10 km Pursuit | (Sweden) Magdalena Forsberg | (Russia) Olga Pyleva | (Germany) Andrea Henkel | (Sweden) Magdalena Forsberg | Detail |
| 3 | 20 December 2001 | (Slovakia) Brezno-Osrblie | 15 km Individual | (Sweden) Magdalena Forsberg | (Ukraine) Olena Zubrilova | (Finland) Katja Holanti | (Sweden) Magdalena Forsberg | Detail |
| 3 | 21 December 2001 | (Slovakia) Brezno-Osrblie | 7.5 km Sprint | (Finland) Katja Holanti | (Germany) Kati Wilhelm | (Germany) Katrin Apel | (Sweden) Magdalena Forsberg | Detail |
| 3 | 22 December 2001 | (Slovakia) Brezno-Osrblie | 12.5 km Mass Start | (Sweden) Magdalena Forsberg | (Russia) Olga Pyleva | (Germany) Uschi Disl | (Sweden) Magdalena Forsberg | Detail |
| 4 | 10 January 2002 | (Germany) Oberhof | 7.5 km Sprint | (Norway) Liv Grete Poirée | (Russia) Olga Pyleva | (Sweden) Magdalena Forsberg | (Sweden) Magdalena Forsberg | Detail |
| 4 | 11 January 2002 | (Germany) Oberhof | 10 km Pursuit | (Sweden) Magdalena Forsberg | (Ukraine) Olena Zubrilova | (Norway) Liv Grete Poirée | (Sweden) Magdalena Forsberg | Detail |
| 4 | 13 January 2002 | (Germany) Oberhof | 12.5 km Mass Start | (Ukraine) Olena Zubrilova | (Norway) Liv Grete Poirée | (Sweden) Magdalena Forsberg | (Sweden) Magdalena Forsberg | Detail |
| 5 | 19 January 2002 | (Germany) Ruhpolding | 7.5 km Sprint | (Norway) Liv Grete Poirée | (Ukraine) Olena Zubrilova | (Bulgaria) Irina Nikulchina | (Sweden) Magdalena Forsberg | Detail |
| 5 | 20 January 2002 | (Germany) Ruhpolding | 10 km Pursuit | (Norway) Liv Grete Poirée | (Sweden) Magdalena Forsberg | (Ukraine) Olena Zubrilova | (Sweden) Magdalena Forsberg | Detail |
| 6 | 23 January 2002 | (Italy) Antholz-Anterselva | 15 km Individual | (Norway) Liv Grete Poirée | (Norway) Gunn Margit Andreassen | (Slovenia) Andreja Grašič | (Sweden) Magdalena Forsberg | Detail |
| 6 | 27 January 2002 | (Italy) Antholz-Anterselva | 10 km Pursuit | (Norway) Liv Grete Poirée | (Norway) Gunn Margit Andreassen | (Norway) Linda Tjørhom | (Sweden) Magdalena Forsberg | Detail |
| OG | 11 February 2002 | (United States) Salt Lake City | 15 km Individual | (Germany) Andrea Henkel | (Norway) Liv Grete Poirée | (Sweden) Magdalena Forsberg | (Sweden) Magdalena Forsberg | Detail |
| OG | 13 February 2002 | (United States) Salt Lake City | 7.5 km Sprint | (Germany) Kati Wilhelm | (Germany) Uschi Disl | (Sweden) Magdalena Forsberg | (Sweden) Magdalena Forsberg | Detail |
| OG | 16 February 2002 | (United States) Salt Lake City | 10 km Pursuit | (Russia) Olga Pyleva | (Germany) Kati Wilhelm | (Bulgaria) Irina Nikulchina | (Sweden) Magdalena Forsberg | Detail |
| 7 | 9 March 2002 | (Sweden) Östersund | 7.5 km Sprint | (Norway) Liv Grete Poirée | (France) Sandrine Bailly | (Sweden) Magdalena Forsberg | (Sweden) Magdalena Forsberg | Detail |
| 7 | 10 March 2002 | (Sweden) Östersund | 10 km Pursuit | (Sweden) Magdalena Forsberg | (France) Florence Baverel-Robert | (Bulgaria) Ekaterina Dafovska | (Sweden) Magdalena Forsberg | Detail |
| 8 | 14 March 2002 | (Finland) Lahti | 7.5 km Sprint | (Germany) Katrin Apel | (Sweden) Magdalena Forsberg | (France) Sandrine Bailly | (Sweden) Magdalena Forsberg | Detail |
| 8 | 17 March 2002 | (Finland) Lahti | 10 km Pursuit | (Germany) Katrin Apel | (Sweden) Magdalena Forsberg | (Germany) Katja Beer | (Sweden) Magdalena Forsberg | Detail |
| 9 | 21 March 2002 | (Norway) Oslo Holmenkollen | 7.5 km Sprint | (Germany) Katrin Apel | (Bulgaria) Ekaterina Dafovska | (Russia) Svetlana Ishmouratova | (Sweden) Magdalena Forsberg | Detail |
| 9 | 23 March 2002 | (Norway) Oslo Holmenkollen | 10 km Pursuit | (Sweden) Magdalena Forsberg | (Germany) Katrin Apel | (Germany) Uschi Disl | (Sweden) Magdalena Forsberg | Detail |
| WC | 24 March 2002 | (Norway) Oslo Holmenkollen | 12.5 km Mass Start | (Ukraine) Olena Zubrilova | (Russia) Olga Pyleva | (Belarus) Olga Nazarova | (Sweden) Magdalena Forsberg | Detail |

=== Men's team ===
| Event | Date | Place | Discipline | Winner | Second | Third |
|---|---|---|---|---|---|---|
| 1 | 8 December 2001 | (Austria) Hochfilzen | 4x7.5 km Relay | Germany Ricco Gross; Marco Morgenstern; Michael Greis; Frank Luck | Norway Egil Gjelland; Ole Einar Bjørndalen; Frode Andresen; Halvard Hanevold | Belarus Alexei Aidarov; Alexandr Syman; Oleg Ryzhenkov; Vadim Sashurin |
| 2 | 15 December 2001 | (Slovenia) Pokljuka | 4x7.5 km Relay | Austria Daniel Mesotitsch; Wolfgang Perner; Christoph Sumann; Ludwig Gredler | Belarus Alexei Aidarov; Alexandr Syman; Oleg Ryzhenkov; Vadim Sashurin | Norway Ole Einar Bjørndalen; Egil Gjelland; Dag Bjørndalen; Halvard Hanevold |
| 5 | 18 January 2002 | (Germany) Ruhpolding | 4x7.5 km Relay | Germany Ricco Gross; Peter Sendel; Sven Fischer; Frank Luck | Norway Egil Gjelland; Stian Eckhoff; Frode Andresen; Halvard Hanevold | Russia Viktor Maigourov; Sergei Rusinov; Sergei Tchepikov; Pavel Rostovtsev |
| 6 | 26 January 2002 | (Italy) Antholz-Anterselva | 4x7.5 km Relay | Norway Halvard Hanevold; Egil Gjelland; Frode Andresen; Ole Einar Bjørndalen | France Gilles Marguet; Ferréol Cannard; Raphael Poiree; Julien Robert | Slovenia Janez Ožbolt; Marko Dolenc; Tomaž Globočnik; Aleksander Grajf |
| OG | 20 February 2002 | (United States) Salt Lake City | 4x7.5 km Relay | Norway Halvard Hanevold; Frode Andresen; Egil Gjelland; Ole Einar Bjørndalen | Germany Ricco Gross; Peter Sendel; Sven Fischer; Frank Luck | France Gilles Marguet; Vincent Defrasne; Julien Robert; Raphael Poiree |
| 8 | 16 March 2002 | (Finland) Lahti | 4x7.5 km Relay | Germany Ricco Gross; Michael Greis; Sven Fischer; Frank Luck | Norway Stian Eckhoff; Frode Andresen; Egil Gjelland; Halvard Hanevold | Belarus Alexei Aidarov; Rustam Valiullin; Alexandr Syman; Oleg Ryzhenkov |

=== Women's team ===
| Event | Date | Place | Discipline | Winner | Second | Third |
|---|---|---|---|---|---|---|
| 1 | 7 December 2001 | (Austria) Hochfilzen | 4x7.5 km Relay | Germany Uschi Disl; Katrin Apel; Martina Zellner; Martina Glagow | Russia Olga Pyleva; Galina Kukleva; Anna Bogaliy; Svetlana Ishmouratova | Bulgaria Pavlina Filipova; Irina Nikulchina; Ekaterina Dafovska; Iva Karagiozova |
| 2 | 14 December 2001 | (Slovenia) Pokljuka | 4x7.5 km Relay | Germany Katrin Apel; Andrea Henkel; Janet Klein; Kati Wilhelm | Norway Liv Grete Poiree; Gro Marit Istad-Kristiansen; Linda Tjorhom; Gunn Margit Andreassen | Ukraine Olena Zubrilova; Olena Petrova; Nina Lemesh; Tetyana Vodopyanova |
| 5 | 17 January 2002 | (Germany) Ruhpolding | 4x7.5 km Relay | Germany Katrin Apel; Uschi Disl; Martina Zellner; Kati Wilhelm | Russia Olga Pyleva; Galina Kukleva; Anna Bogaliy; Albina Akhatova | Norway Ann-Elen Skjelbreid; Linda Tjorhom; Gunn Margit Andreassen; Liv Grete Poiree |
| 6 | 25 January 2002 | (Italy) Antholz-Anterselva | 4x7.5 km Relay | France Delphyne Heymann; Sylvie Becaert; Sandrine Bailly; Corinne Niogret | Norway Gunn Margit Andreassen; Ann-Elen Skjelbreid; Gro Marit Istad-Kristiansen; Linda Tjorhom | Slovakia Martina Jašicová; Anna Murínová; Tatiana Kutlíková; Soňa Mihoková |
| OG | 18 February 2002 | (United States) Salt Lake City | 4x7.5 km Relay | Germany Katrin Apel; Uschi Disl; Andrea Henkel; Kati Wilhelm | Norway Ann-Elen Skjelbreid; Linda Tjorhom; Gunn Margit Andreassen; Liv Grete Poiree | Russia Olga Pyleva; Galina Kukleva; Svetlana Ishmouratova; Albina Akhatova |
| 8 | 15 March 2002 | (Finland) Lahti | 4x7.5 km Relay | Germany Katrin Apel; Martina Zellner; Martina Glagow; Katja Beer | Russia Svetlana Tchernousova; Irina Malgina; Svetlana Ishmouratova; Albina Akhatova | France Sylvie Becaert; Delphyne Heymann; Corinne Niogret; Sandrine Bailly |

== Standings: Men ==
=== Overall ===
| Pos. | | Points |
|---|---|---|
| 1. | (France) Raphaël Poirée | 805 |
| 2. | (Russia) Pavel Rostovtsev | 719 |
| 3. | (Norway) Ole Einar Bjørndalen | 692 |
| 4. | (Germany) Sven Fischer | 681 |
| 5. | (Norway) Frode Andresen | 664 |

- Final standings after 24 races.

=== Individual ===
| Pos. | | Points |
|---|---|---|
| 1. | (Germany) Frank Luck | 128 |
| 2. | (Norway) Ole Einar Bjørndalen | 108 |
| 3. | (Russia) Pavel Rostovtsev | 100 |
| 4. | (Russia) Sergei Tchepikov | 92 |
| 5. | (France) Raphaël Poirée | 88 |

- Final standings after 4 races.

=== Sprint ===
| Pos. | | Points |
|---|---|---|
| 1. | (Germany) Sven Fischer | 291 |
| 2. | (Norway) Frode Andresen | 255 |
| 3. | (France) Raphaël Poirée | 233 |
| 4. | (Russia) Pavel Rostovtsev | 231 |
| 5. | (Norway) Ole Einar Bjørndalen | 219 |

- Final standings after 8 races.

=== Pursuit ===
| Pos. | | Points |
|---|---|---|
| 1. | (France) Raphaël Poirée | 362 |
| 2. | (Russia) Pavel Rostovtsev | 324 |
| 3. | (Norway) Ole Einar Bjørndalen | 315 |
| 4. | (Norway) Frode Andresen | 259 |
| 5. | (Germany) Sven Fischer | 254 |

- Final standings after 9 races.

=== Mass Start ===
| Pos. | | Points |
|---|---|---|
| 1. | (Russia) Viktor Maigourov | 109 |
| 2. | (France) Raphaël Poirée | 100 |
| 3. | (Germany) Sven Fischer | 88 |
| 4. | (Finland) Vesa Hietalahti | 81 |
| 5. | (Germany) Ricco Groß | 73 |

- Final standings after 4 races.

=== Relay ===
| Pos. | | Points |
|---|---|---|
| 1. | Norway | 238 |
| 2. | Germany | 230 |
| 3. | Belarus | 202 |
| 4. | France | 197 |
| 5. | Austria | 193 |

- Final standings after 6 races.

=== Nation ===
| Pos. | | Points |
|---|---|---|
| 1. | Germany | 4095 |
| 2. | Norway | 3969 |
| 3. | Russia | 3852 |
| 4. | Austria | 3551 |
| 5. | France | 3422 |

- Final standings after 18 races.

== Standings: Women ==
=== Overall ===
| Pos. | | Points |
|---|---|---|
| 1. | (Sweden) Magdalena Forsberg | 944 |
| 2. | (Norway) Liv Grete Poirée | 795 |
| 3. | (Germany) Uschi Disl | 739 |
| 4. | (Russia) Olga Pyleva | 726 |
| 5. | (Germany) Katrin Apel | 639 |

- Final standings after 24 races.

=== Individual ===
| Pos. | | Points |
|---|---|---|
| 1. | (Sweden) Magdalena Forsberg | 143 |
| 2. | (Norway) Liv Grete Poirée | 133 |
| 3. | (Russia) Olga Pyleva | 120 |
| 4. | (Germany) Andrea Henkel | 117 |
| 5. | (Norway) Gunn Margit Andreassen | 100 |

- Final standings after 4 races.

=== Sprint ===
| Pos. | | Points |
|---|---|---|
| 1. | (Sweden) Magdalena Forsberg | 302 |
| 2. | (Norway) Liv Grete Poirée | 262 |
| 3. | (Germany) Uschi Disl | 260 |
| 4. | (Germany) Katrin Apel | 245 |
| 5. | (Russia) Olga Pyleva | 217 |

- Final standings after 8 races.

=== Pursuit ===
| Pos. | | Points |
|---|---|---|
| 1. | (Sweden) Magdalena Forsberg | 376 |
| 2. | (Norway) Liv Grete Poirée | 327 |
| 3. | (Germany) Uschi Disl | 277 |
| 4. | (Germany) Katrin Apel | 268 |
| 5. | (Russia) Olga Pyleva | 267 |

- Final standings after 9 races.

=== Mass Start ===
| Pos. | | Points |
|---|---|---|
| 1. | (Sweden) Magdalena Forsberg | 123 |
| 2. | (Russia) Olga Pyleva | 122 |
| 3. | (Ukraine) Olena Zubrilova | 114 |
| 4. | (Germany) Uschi Disl | 108 |
| 5. | (Russia) Svetlana Ishmouratova | 80 |

- Final standings after 4 races.

=== Relay ===
| Pos. | | Points |
|---|---|---|
| 1. | Germany | 250 |
| 2. | Norway | 221 |
| 3. | Russia | 221 |
| 4. | France | 207 |
| 5. | Bulgaria | 181 |

- Final standings after 6 races.

=== Nation ===
| Pos. | | Points |
|---|---|---|
| 1. | Germany | 4099 |
| 2. | Russia | 3895 |
| 3. | Norway | 3623 |
| 4. | France | 3571 |
| 5. | Ukraine | 3381 |

- Final standings after 18 races.

== Medal table ==
| Rank | Nation | Gold | Silver | Bronze | Total |
|---|---|---|---|---|---|
| 1 | Germany | 18 | 19 | 14 | 51 |
| 2 | Norway | 13 | 15 | 9 | 37 |
| 3 | Sweden | 9 | 4 | 5 | 18 |
| 4 | France | 8 | 6 | 5 | 19 |
| 5 | Russia | 5 | 8 | 8 | 21 |
| 6 | Austria | 3 | 0 | 2 | 5 |
| 7 | Ukraine | 2 | 4 | 4 | 10 |
| 8 | Finland | 2 | 1 | 3 | 6 |
| 9 | Bulgaria | 0 | 1 | 4 | 5 |
| 10 | Belarus | 0 | 1 | 3 | 4 |
| 11 | Latvia | 0 | 1 | 0 | 1 |
| 12 | Slovenia | 0 | 0 | 2 | 2 |
| 13 | Slovakia | 0 | 0 | 1 | 1 |
| Totals (13 entries) | | 60 | 60 | 60 | 180 |

== Achievements ==
First World Cup career victory

- Christoph Sumann (AUT), 25, in his 2nd season — the WC 3 Sprint in Brezno-Osrblie; it also was his first podium
- Katja Holanti (FIN), 27, in her 9th season — the WC 3 Sprint in Brezno-Osrblie; first podium was 2001–02 Individual in Brezno-Osrblie
- Daniel Mesotitsch (AUT), 25, in his 3rd season — the WC 6 Individual in Antholz-Anterselva; it also was his first podium
- Olga Pyleva (RUS), 26, in her 3rd season — the Olympic Pursuit in Salt Lake City; first podium was 1999–2000 Sprint in Ruhpolding
- Katrin Apel (GER), 28, in her 7th season — the WC 8 Sprint in Lahti; first podium was 1995–96 Individual in Pokljuka

First World Cup podium

- Vincent Defrasne (FRA), 24, in his 4th season — no. 3 in the WC 2 Individual in Pokljuka
- Katja Holanti (FIN), 27, in her 9th season — no. 3 in the WC 3 Individual in Brezno-Osrblie
- Alexander Wolf (GER), 23, in his 4th season — no. 2 in the WC 3 Mass Start in Brezno-Osrblie
- Michael Greis (GER), 25, in his 2nd season — no. 2 in the WC 5 Sprint in Ruhpolding
- Mikhail Kochkin (RUS), 22, in his 3rd season — no. 3 in the WC 6 Individual in Antholz-Anterselva
- Linda Tjørhom (NOR), 22, in her 3rd season — no. 3 in the WC 6 Pursuit in Antholz-Anterselva
- Katja Beer (GER), 25, in her 7th season — no. 3 in the WC 8 Pursuit in Lahti
- Olga Nazarova (BLR), 24, in her 3rd season — no. 3 in the World Championships Mass Start in Holmenkollen

Victory in this World Cup (all-time number of victories in parentheses)

Men

- Raphaël Poirée (FRA), 7 (21) first places
- Ole Einar Bjørndalen (NOR), 5 (27) first places
- Pavel Rostovtsev (RUS), 4 (7) first places
- Sven Fischer (GER), 3 (22) first places
- Frank Luck (GER), 2 (11) first places
- Vesa Hietalahti (FIN), 1 (3) first place
- Christoph Sumann (AUT), 1 (1) first place
- Daniel Mesotitsch (AUT), 1 (1) first place

Women

- Magdalena Forsberg (SWE), 9 (42) first places
- Liv Grete Skjelbreid Poirée (NOR), 6 (13) first places
- Katrin Apel (GER), 3 (3) first places
- Olena Zubrilova (UKR), 2 (17) first places
- Andrea Henkel (GER), 1 (3) first place
- Kati Wilhelm (GER), 1 (3) first place
- Katja Holanti (FIN), 1 (1) first place
- Olga Pyleva (RUS), 1 (1) first place

== Retirements ==
Following notable biathletes announced their retirement during or after the 2001–02 season:

- Ivan Masařík (CZE)
- Ville Raikkonen (FIN)
- Dmitry Pantov (KAZ)
- Henrik Forsberg (SWE)
- Eva Háková (CZE)
- Katja Holanti (FIN)
- Delphyne Heymann (FRA)
- Martina Zellner (GER)
- Anna Stera (POL)
- Olga Romasko (RUS)
- Magdalena Forsberg (SWE)
- Tetyana Vodopyanova (UKR)
