= 1999–2000 Biathlon World Cup =

Biathlon competition

1999–00 World Cup
Discipline	Men	Women
Overall	(France) Raphaël Poirée	(Sweden) Magdalena Forsberg
Nations Cup	Germany	Germany
Individual	(Germany) Frank Luck	(Sweden) Magdalena Forsberg
Sprint	(Norway) Ole Einar Bjørndalen	(Sweden) Magdalena Forsberg
Pursuit	(Norway) Ole Einar Bjørndalen	(Sweden) Magdalena Forsberg
Mass start	(France) Raphaël Poirée	(Russia) Galina Koukleva
Relay	Norway	Russia

Competition

The 1999–2000 Biathlon World Cup was a multi-race tournament over a season of biathlon, organised by the International Biathlon Union. The season started on 2 December 1999 in Hochfilzen, Austria, and ended on 19 March 2000 in Khanty-Mansiysk, Russia. It was the 23rd season of the Biathlon World Cup.

== Calendar ==
Below is the IBU World Cup calendar for the 1999–2000 season.

Location	Date	Individual	Sprint	Pursuit	Mass start	Relay
(Austria) Hochfilzen	2–5 December	●		●		●
(Slovenia) Pokljuka	8–12 December		●	●		●
(Slovenia) Pokljuka (Note: Originally scheduled to be held in Brezno-Osrblie, Slovakia)	15–19 December	●	●		●	
(Germany) Oberhof	5–9 January		●	●		●
(Germany) Ruhpolding	12–16 January		●	●	●	
(Italy) Antholz-Anterselva	20–23 January		●	●		●
(Sweden) Östersund	11–13 February		●	●		
(Norway) Oslo	19–27 February	●	●	●	●	
(Finland) Lahti	9–12 March	●		●		●
(Russia) Khanty-Mansiysk	17–19 March		●	●	●	
Total		4	8	9	4	6

== World Cup podiums ==
=== Men ===
Stage	Date	Place	Discipline	Winner	Second	Third	Yellow bib (After competition)	Det.
1	2 December 1999	(Austria) Hochfilzen	20 km Individual	(Norway) Ole Einar Bjørndalen	(Ukraine) Ruslan Lysenko	(Germany) Frank Luck	(Norway) Ole Einar Bjørndalen	Detail
1	4 December 1999	(Austria) Hochfilzen	12.5 km Pursuit	(Norway) Ole Einar Bjørndalen	(Germany) Frank Luck	(Germany) Sven Fischer	(Norway) Ole Einar Bjørndalen	Detail
2	8 December 1999	(Slovenia) Pokljuka	10 km Sprint	(Norway) Frode Andresen	(Russia) Pavel Rostovtsev	(Norway) Ole Einar Bjørndalen	(Norway) Ole Einar Bjørndalen	Detail
2	10 December 1999	(Slovenia) Pokljuka	12.5 km Pursuit	(Norway) Frode Andresen	(Germany) Peter Sendel	(Ukraine) Vyacheslav Derkach	(Norway) Ole Einar Bjørndalen	Detail
3	15 December 1999	(Slovakia) Brezno-Osrblie	20 km Individual	(France) Raphaël Poirée	(Belarus) Vadim Sashurin	(Germany) Frank Luck	(Norway) Ole Einar Bjørndalen	Detail
3	17 December 1999	(Slovakia) Brezno-Osrblie	10 km Sprint	(Norway) Frode Andresen	(Germany) Sven Fischer	(Germany) Frank Luck	(Germany) Sven Fischer	Detail
3	19 December 1999	(Slovakia) Brezno-Osrblie	15 km Mass Start	(Russia) Vladimir Drachev	(Belarus) Vadim Sashurin	(Germany) Sven Fischer	(Germany) Sven Fischer	Detail
4	6 January 2000	(Germany) Oberhof	10 km Sprint	(Norway) Ole Einar Bjørndalen	(Germany) Frank Luck	(France) Raphaël Poirée	(Germany) Sven Fischer	Detail
4	7 January 2000	(Germany) Oberhof	12.5 km Pursuit	(Norway) Ole Einar Bjørndalen	(Germany) Peter Sendel	(Czech Republic) Zdeněk Vítek	(Germany) Sven Fischer	Detail
5	12 January 2000	(Germany) Ruhpolding	15 km Mass Start	(Germany) Ricco Groß	(France) Raphaël Poirée	(Germany) Sven Fischer	(Germany) Sven Fischer	Detail
5	15 January 2000	(Germany) Ruhpolding	10 km Sprint	(Germany) Ricco Groß	(Belarus) Vadim Sashurin	(France) Raphaël Poirée	(Germany) Sven Fischer	Detail
5	16 January 2000	(Germany) Ruhpolding	12.5 km Pursuit	(Norway) Halvard Hanevold	(Norway) Ole Einar Bjørndalen	(France) Raphaël Poirée	(Norway) Ole Einar Bjørndalen	Detail
6	20 January 2000	(Italy) Antholz-Anterselva	10 km Sprint	(France) Raphaël Poirée	(Norway) Ole Einar Bjørndalen	(Norway) Frode Andresen	(Norway) Ole Einar Bjørndalen	Detail
6	22 January 2000	(Italy) Antholz-Anterselva	12.5 km Pursuit	(Norway) Ole Einar Bjørndalen	(Norway) Frode Andresen	(France) Raphaël Poirée	(Norway) Ole Einar Bjørndalen	Detail
7	11 February 2000	(Sweden) Östersund	10 km Sprint	(Norway) Frode Andresen	(Austria) Wolfgang Rottmann	(Norway) Ole Einar Bjørndalen	(Norway) Ole Einar Bjørndalen	Detail
7	13 February 2000	(Sweden) Östersund	12.5 km Pursuit	(Norway) Frode Andresen	(Russia) Pavel Rostovtsev	(Germany) Ricco Groß	(France) Raphaël Poirée	Detail
WC	19 February 2000	(Norway) Oslo Holmenkollen	10 km Sprint	(Norway) Frode Andresen	(Russia) Pavel Rostovtsev	(Italy) René Cattarinussi	(France) Raphaël Poirée	Detail
WC	20 February 2000	(Norway) Oslo Holmenkollen	12.5 km Pursuit	(Germany) Frank Luck	(Russia) Pavel Rostovtsev	(France) Raphaël Poirée	(France) Raphaël Poirée	Detail
WC	23 February 2000	(Norway) Oslo Holmenkollen	20 km Individual	(Austria) Wolfgang Rottmann	(Austria) Ludwig Gredler	(Germany) Frank Luck	(France) Raphaël Poirée	Detail
WC	26 February 2000	(Norway) Oslo Holmenkollen	15 km Mass Start	(France) Raphaël Poirée	(Russia) Pavel Rostovtsev	(Norway) Ole Einar Bjørndalen	(France) Raphaël Poirée	Detail
8	9 March 2000	(Finland) Lahti	20 km Individual	(Norway) Halvard Hanevold	(Germany) Carsten Heymann	(Germany) Sven Fischer	(France) Raphaël Poirée	Detail
8	12 March 2000	(Finland) Lahti	12.5 km Pursuit	(Germany) Sven Fischer	(Germany) Peter Sendel	(Norway) Frode Andresen	(France) Raphaël Poirée	Detail
9	17 March 2000	(Russia) Khanty-Mansiysk	10 km Sprint	(Belarus) Vadim Sashurin	(Italy) Devis Da Canal	(Germany) Sven Fischer	(France) Raphaël Poirée	Detail
9	18 March 2000	(Russia) Khanty-Mansiysk	12.5 km Pursuit	(Germany) Sven Fischer	(France) Raphaël Poirée	(Russia) Sergei Rozhkov	(France) Raphaël Poirée	Detail
9	19 March 2000	(Russia) Khanty-Mansiysk	15 km Mass Start	(Italy) René Cattarinussi	(Russia) Pavel Rostovtsev	(Norway) Frode Andresen	(France) Raphaël Poirée	Detail

=== Women ===
Stage	Date	Place	Discipline	Winner	Second	Third	Yellow bib (After competition)	Det.
1	3 December 1999	(Austria) Hochfilzen	15 km Individual	(Russia) Galina Koukleva	(Sweden) Magdalena Forsberg	(France) Corinne Niogret	(Russia) Galina Koukleva	Detail
1	4 December 1999	(Austria) Hochfilzen	10 km Pursuit	(France) Corinne Niogret	(Russia) Albina Akhatova	(Sweden) Magdalena Forsberg	(France) Corinne Niogret	Detail
2	9 December 1999	(Slovenia) Pokljuka	7.5 km Sprint	(Sweden) Magdalena Forsberg	(Russia) Maria Strelenko	(France) Corinne Niogret	(Sweden) Magdalena Forsberg	Detail
2	10 December 1999	(Slovenia) Pokljuka	10 km Pursuit	(Ukraine) Olena Zubrilova	(Sweden) Magdalena Forsberg	(Ukraine) Tetyana Vodopyanova	(Sweden) Magdalena Forsberg	Detail
3	16 December 1999	(Slovakia) Brezno-Osrblie	15 km Individual	(Germany) Uschi Disl	(Russia) Svetlana Ishmouratova	(Bulgaria) Pavlina Filipova	(Sweden) Magdalena Forsberg	Detail
3	18 December 1999	(Slovakia) Brezno-Osrblie	7.5 km Sprint	(Norway) Gro Marit Istad	(Ukraine) Olena Petrova	(Bulgaria) Irina Nikulchina	(Sweden) Magdalena Forsberg	Detail
3	19 December 1999	(Slovakia) Brezno-Osrblie	12.5 km Mass Start	(Germany) Andrea Henkel	(Russia) Svetlana Ishmouratova	(Ukraine) Olena Petrova	(Sweden) Magdalena Forsberg	Detail
4	5 January 2000	(Germany) Oberhof	7.5 km Sprint	(Ukraine) Olena Zubrilova	(France) Emmanuelle Claret	(Italy) Nathalie Santer	(Sweden) Magdalena Forsberg	Detail
4	7 January 2000	(Germany) Oberhof	10 km Pursuit	(Ukraine) Olena Zubrilova	(Sweden) Magdalena Forsberg	(Russia) Svetlana Ishmouratova	(Sweden) Magdalena Forsberg	Detail
5	12 January 2000	(Germany) Ruhpolding	12.5 km Mass Start	(Russia) Galina Koukleva	(Sweden) Magdalena Forsberg	(Ukraine) Olena Petrova	(Sweden) Magdalena Forsberg	Detail
5	15 January 2000	(Germany) Ruhpolding	7.5 km Sprint	(Italy) Nathalie Santer	(Germany) Katrin Apel	(Russia) Olga Pyleva	(Sweden) Magdalena Forsberg	Detail
5	16 January 2000	(Germany) Ruhpolding	10 km Pursuit	(Germany) Martina Zellner	(France) Corinne Niogret	(Sweden) Magdalena Forsberg	(Sweden) Magdalena Forsberg	Detail
6	21 January 2000	(Italy) Antholz-Anterselva	7.5 km Sprint	(Germany) Martina Glagow	(Germany) Martina Zellner	(Germany) Andrea Henkel	(Sweden) Magdalena Forsberg	Detail
6	22 January 2000	(Italy) Antholz-Anterselva	10 km Pursuit	(Germany) Andrea Henkel	(Russia) Galina Koukleva	(Sweden) Magdalena Forsberg	(Sweden) Magdalena Forsberg	Detail
7	12 February 2000	(Sweden) Östersund	7.5 km Sprint	(Russia) Galina Koukleva	(Russia) Svetlana Ishmouratova	(France) Florence Baverel	(Sweden) Magdalena Forsberg	Detail
7	13 February 2000	(Sweden) Östersund	10 km Pursuit	(Germany) Martina Glagow	(Russia) Svetlana Tchernousova	(Russia) Svetlana Ishmouratova	(Sweden) Magdalena Forsberg	Detail
WC	19 February 2000	(Norway) Oslo Holmenkollen	7.5 km Sprint	(Norway) Liv Grete Skjelbreid	(Germany) Katrin Apel	(Germany) Martina Zellner	(Sweden) Magdalena Forsberg	Detail
WC	20 February 2000	(Norway) Oslo Holmenkollen	10 km Pursuit	(Sweden) Magdalena Forsberg	(Germany) Uschi Disl	(France) Florence Baverel	(Sweden) Magdalena Forsberg	Detail
WC	22 February 2000	(Norway) Oslo Holmenkollen	15 km Individual	(France) Corinne Niogret	(China) Yu Shumei	(Sweden) Magdalena Forsberg	(Sweden) Magdalena Forsberg	Detail
WC	26 February 2000	(Norway) Oslo Holmenkollen	12.5 km Mass Start	(Norway) Liv Grete Skjelbreid	(Russia) Galina Koukleva	(France) Corinne Niogret	(Sweden) Magdalena Forsberg	Detail
8	9 March 2000	(Finland) Lahti	15 km Individual	(Ukraine) Olena Zubrilova	(Germany) Andrea Henkel	(Sweden) Magdalena Forsberg	(Sweden) Magdalena Forsberg	Detail
8	12 March 2000	(Finland) Lahti	10 km Pursuit	(Ukraine) Olena Zubrilova	(Sweden) Magdalena Forsberg	(Germany) Andrea Henkel	(Sweden) Magdalena Forsberg	Detail
9	16 March 2000	(Russia) Khanty-Mansiysk	7.5 km Sprint	(Ukraine) Olena Zubrilova	(Russia) Olga Pyleva	(Germany) Martina Glagow	(Sweden) Magdalena Forsberg	Detail
9	18 March 2000	(Russia) Khanty-Mansiysk	10 km Pursuit	(Sweden) Magdalena Forsberg	(France) Corinne Niogret	(Ukraine) Olena Zubrilova	(Sweden) Magdalena Forsberg	Detail
9	19 March 2000	(Russia) Khanty-Mansiysk	12.5 km Mass Start	(Germany) Martina Zellner	(Ukraine) Olena Zubrilova	(Ukraine) Olena Petrova	(Sweden) Magdalena Forsberg	Detail

=== Men's team ===
Event	Date	Place	Discipline	Winner	Second	Third
1	5 December 1999	(Austria) Hochfilzen	4x7.5 km Relay	Austria Wolfgang Perner; Ludwig Gredler; Günther Beck; Wolfgang Rottmann	Norway Egil Gjelland; Frode Andresen; Dag Bjørndalen; Halvard Hanevold	Germany Ricco Groß; Frank Luck; Peter Sendel; Sven Fischer
2	11 December 1999	(Slovenia) Pokljuka	4x7.5 km Relay	Norway Egil Gjelland; Frode Andresen; Halvard Hanevold; Ole Einar Bjørndalen	Russia Sergei Rozhkov; Vyacheslav Kunayev; Vladimir Drachev; Pavel Rostovtsev	Germany Frank Luck; Peter Sendel; Carsten Heymann; Sven Fischer
4	9 January 2000	(Germany) Oberhof	4x7.5 km Relay	Norway Egil Gjelland; Halvard Hanevold; Dag Bjørndalen; Ole Einar Bjørndalen	Germany Frank Luck; Sven Fischer; Ricco Gross; Peter Sendel	Czech Republic Ivan Masařík; Roman Dostál; Marian Málek; Zdeněk Vítek
5	13 January 2000	(Germany) Ruhpolding	4x7.5 km Relay	Germany Frank Luck; Sven Fischer; Peter Sendel; Ricco Gross	Norway Egil Gjelland; Halvard Hanevold; Dag Bjørndalen; Ole Einar Bjørndalen	Russia Viktor Maigourov; Sergei Rozhkov; Vladimir Drachev; Pavel Rostovtsev
6	23 January 2000	(Italy) Antholz-Anterselva	4x7.5 km Relay	Russia Viktor Maigourov; Sergei Rozhkov; Pavel Rostovtsev; Vladimir Drachev	Germany Frank Luck; Alexander Wolf; Ricco Gross; Sven Fischer	Norway Halvard Hanevold; Egil Gjelland; Sylfest Glimsdal; Stig-Are Eriksen
WC	11 March 2000	(Finland) Lahti	4x7.5 km Relay	Russia Viktor Maigourov; Sergei Rozhkov; Vladimir Drachev; Pavel Rostovtsev	Norway Egil Gjelland; Frode Andresen; Halvard Hanevold; Ole Einar Bjørndalen	Germany Frank Luck; Peter Sendel; Sven Fischer; Ricco Gross

=== Women's team ===
Event	Date	Place	Discipline	Winner	Second	Third
1	5 December 1999	(Austria) Hochfilzen	4x7.5 km Relay	Norway Gro Marit Istad; Ann-Elen Skjelbreid; Liv Grete Skjelbreid; Gunn Margit Andreassen	Germany Uschi Disl; Simone Greiner; Katja Beer; Martina Zellner	Russia Mariya Strelenko; Galina Kukleva; Svetlana Tchernousova; Albina Akhatova
2	12 December 1999	(Slovenia) Pokljuka	4x7.5 km Relay	Russia Albina Akhatova; Galina Kukleva; Mariya Strelenko; Svetlana Ishmouratova	Ukraine Olena Zubrilova; Olena Petrova; Nataliya Tereshchenko; Tetyana Vodopyanova	Bulgaria Pavlina Filipova; Irina Nikulchina; Radka Popova; Iva Karagiozova
4	8 January 2000	(Germany) Oberhof	4x7.5 km Relay	Russia Olga Pyleva; Galina Kukleva; Svetlana Tchernousova; Svetlana Ishmouratova	Germany Uschi Disl; Katrin Apel; Katja Beer; Andrea Henkel	France Sylvie Becaert; Emmanuelle Claret; Delphyne Burlet; Corinne Niogret
5	14 January 2000	(Germany) Ruhpolding	4x7.5 km Relay	Germany Uschi Disl; Katrin Apel; Andrea Henkel; Martina Zellner	Russia Olga Pyleva; Galina Kukleva; Svetlana Tchernousova; Svetlana Ishmouratova	Ukraine Iryna Merkushina; Olena Petrova; Nina Lemesh; Olena Zubrilova
6	23 January 2000	(Italy) Antholz-Anterselva	4x7.5 km Relay	Germany Andrea Henkel; Martina Glagow; Katrin Apel; Martina Zellner	Russia Olga Pyleva; Galina Kukleva; Mariya Strelenko; Svetlana Ishmouratova	Ukraine Iryna Merkushina; Olena Petrova; Nina Lemesh; Olena Zubrilova
WC	25 February 2000	(Norway) Oslo	4x7.5 km Relay	Russia Olga Pyleva; Svetlana Tchernousova; Galina Kukleva; Albina Akhatova	Germany Uschi Disl; Katrin Apel; Andrea Henkel; Martina Zellner	Ukraine Olena Zubrilova; Olena Petrova; Nina Lemesh; Tetyana Vodopyanova
8	10 March 2000	(Finland) Lahti	4x7.5 km Relay	Germany Uschi Disl; Katrin Apel; Andrea Henkel; Martina Zellner	Russia Olga Pyleva; Svetlana Tchernousova; Galina Kukleva; Albina Akhatova	Ukraine Olena Zubrilova; Olena Petrova; Nina Lemesh; Nataliya Tereshchenko

== Standings: Men ==
=== Overall ===
Pos.		Points
1.	(France) Raphaël Poirée	470
2.	(Norway) Ole Einar Bjørndalen	448
3.	(Germany) Sven Fischer	434
4.	(Russia) Pavel Rostovtsev	384
5.	(Germany) Frank Luck	379

- Final standings after 25 races.

=== Individual ===
Pos.		Points
1.	(Germany) Frank Luck	72
2.	(France) Raphaël Poirée	68
3.	(Germany) Peter Sendel	61
4.	(Austria) Wolfgang Rottmann	56
5.	(Germany) Sven Fischer	52

- Final standings after 4 races.

=== Sprint ===
Pos.		Points
1.	(Norway) Ole Einar Bjørndalen	161
2.	(Norway) Frode Andresen	153
3.	(France) Raphaël Poirée	153
4.	(Germany) Sven Fischer	134
5.	(Belarus) Vadim Sashurin	119

- Final standings after 8 races.

=== Pursuit ===
Pos.		Points
1.	(Norway) Ole Einar Bjørndalen	200
2.	(Germany) Sven Fischer	176
3.	(France) Raphaël Poirée	172
4.	(Norway) Frode Andresen	165
5.	(Russia) Pavel Rostovtsev	162

- Final standings after 9 races.

=== Mass Start ===
Pos.		Points
1.	(France) Raphaël Poirée	77
2.	(Russia) Pavel Rostovtsev	73
3.	(Germany) Sven Fischer	68
4.	(Belarus) Vadim Sashurin	63
5.	(Russia) Vladimir Drachev	62

- Final standings after 4 races.

=== Relay ===
Pos.		Points
1.	Norway	138
2.	Russia	132
3.	Germany	130
4.	Czech Republic	104
5.	Belarus	97

- Final standings after 6 races.

=== Nation ===
Pos.		Points
1.	Germany	3625
2.	Norway	3548
3.	Russia	3338
4.	Austria	3252
5.	Belarus	3211

- Final standings after 18 races.

== Standings: Women ==
=== Overall ===
Pos.		Points
1.	(Sweden) Magdalena Forsberg	510
2.	(Ukraine) Olena Zubrilova	424
3.	(France) Corinne Niogret	411
4.	(Russia) Galina Kukleva	389
5.	(Germany) Andrea Henkel	378

- Final standings after 25 races.

=== Individual ===
Pos.		Points
1.	(Sweden) Magdalena Forsberg	74
2.	(France) Corinne Niogret	68
3.	(Ukraine) Olena Zubrilova	67
4.	(Germany) Uschi Disl	63
5.	(Russia) Albina Akhatova	60

- Final standings after 4 races.

=== Sprint ===
Pos.		Points
1.	(Sweden) Magdalena Forsberg	147
2.	(Russia) Svetlana Ishmouratova	129
3.	(Germany) Martina Zellner	125
4.	(France) Corinne Niogret	123
5.	(Ukraine) Olena Zubrilova	118

- Final standings after 8 races.

=== Pursuit ===
Pos.		Points
1.	(Sweden) Magdalena Forsberg	210
2.	(France) Corinne Niogret	161
3.	(Ukraine) Olena Zubrilova	160
4.	(Germany) Andrea Henkel	148
5.	(Russia) Galina Kukleva	144

- Final standings after 9 races.

=== Mass Start ===
Pos.		Points
1.	(Russia) Galina Kukleva	77
2.	(Ukraine) Olena Petrova	72
3.	(Sweden) Magdalena Forsberg	68
4.	(Germany) Martina Zellner	66
5.	(Germany) Andrea Henkel	65

- Final standings after 4 races.

=== Relay ===
Pos.		Points
1.	Russia	168
2.	Germany	168
3.	Ukraine	143
4.	France	124
5.	Slovakia	122

- Final standings after 6 races.

=== Nation ===
Pos.		Points
1.	Germany	3585
2.	Russia	3550
3.	Ukraine	3434
4.	France	3307
5.	Norway	3132

- Final standings after 18 races.

== Medal table ==
Rank	Nation	Gold	Silver	Bronze	Total
1	Norway	19	6	7	32
2	Germany	16	17	17	50
3	Russia	9	19	6	34
4	Ukraine	6	4	10	20
5	France	5	5	11	21
6	Sweden	3	5	5	13
7	Austria	2	2	0	4
8	Italy	2	1	2	5
9	Belarus	1	3	0	4
10	China	0	1	0	1
11	Bulgaria	0	0	3	3
12	Czech Republic	0	0	2	2
Totals (12 entries)		63	63	63	189

== Achievements ==
Victory in this World Cup (all-time number of victories in parentheses)

Men

- Frode Andresen (NOR), 6 (8) first places
- Ole Einar Bjørndalen (NOR), 5 (14) first places
- Raphaël Poirée (FRA), 3 (8) first places
- Sven Fischer (GER), 2 (17) first places
- Ricco Groß (GER), 2 (6) first places
- Halvard Hanevold (NOR), 2 (5) first places
- Vladimir Drachev (RUS), 1 (12) first place
- Frank Luck (GER), 1 (9) first place
- Vadim Sashurin (BLR), 1 (2) first place
- René Cattarinussi (ITA), 1 (2) first place
- Wolfgang Rottmann (AUT), 1 (1) first place

Women

- Olena Zubrilova (UKR), 6 (14) first places
- Magdalena Forsberg (SWE), 3 (19) first places
- Galina Kukleva (RUS), 3 (7) first places
- Corinne Niogret (FRA), 2 (6) first places
- Liv Grete Skjelbreid (NOR), 2 (5) first places
- Martina Zellner (GER), 2 (3) first places
- Andrea Henkel (GER), 2 (2) first places
- Martina Glagow (GER), 2 (2) first places
- Uschi Disl (GER), 1 (19) first place
- Nathalie Santer (ITA), 1 (3) first place
- Gro Marit Istad (NOR), 1 (1) first place

== Retirements ==
Following notable biathletes retired after the 1999–2000 season:

- Harri Eloranta (FIN)
- Jan Wüstenfeld (GER)
- Pieralberto Carrara (ITA)
- Sylfest Glimsdal (NOR)
- Emmanuelle Claret (FRA)
- Simone Greiner-Petter-Memm (GER)
