= Liv Grete Skjelbreid =

Norwegian biathlete (born 1974)

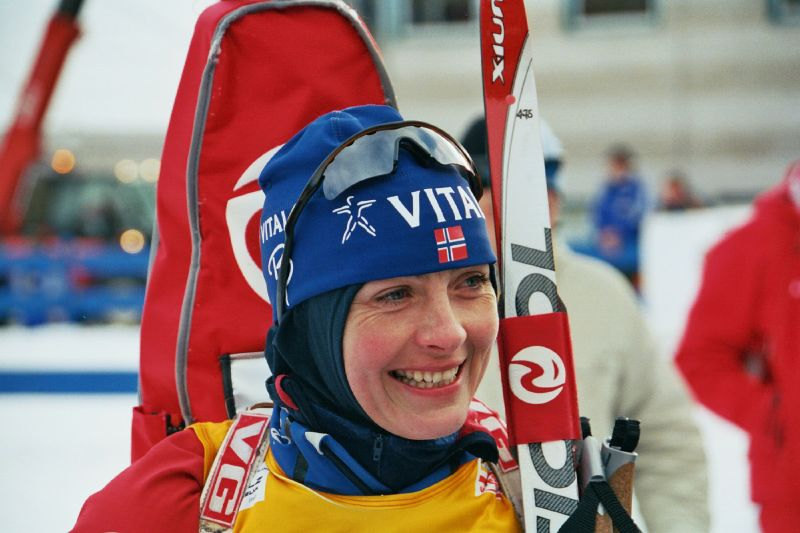
- Skjelbreid in Antholz-Anterselva in 2006.

Personal information
- Full name: Liv Grete Skjelbreid
- Born: 7 July 1974 (age 52) Bergen, Norway
- Height: 1.67 m (5 ft 6 in)

Sport

Professional information
- Sport: Biathlon
- Club: Hålandsdal IL
- World Cup debut: 6 March 1993
- Retired: 26 March 2006

Olympic Games
- Teams: 3 (1998, 2002, 2006)
- Medals: 3 (0 gold)

World Championships
- Teams: 9 (1996, 1997, 1998, 1999, 2000, 2001, 2002, 2004, 2005)
- Medals: 12 (8 gold)

World Cup
- Seasons: 13 (1992/93, 1994/95–2005/06)
- Individual victories: 22
- Individual podiums: 46
- Overall titles: 1 (2003–04)
- Discipline titles: 3: 1 Sprint (2003–04); 1 Pursuit (2003–04); 1 Mass start (2003–04)
Medal record
Women's biathlon
Representing Norway
Event	1st	2nd	3rd
Olympic Games (3 medals)	0	2	1
World Championships (13 medals)	8	3	2
Total (14 medals)	8	5	3
Olympic Games
Silver medal – second place	2002 Salt Lake City	15 km individual
Silver medal – second place	2002 Salt Lake City	4 × 7.5 km relay
Bronze medal – third place	1998 Nagano	4 × 7.5 km relay
World Championships
Gold medal – first place	1997 Brezno-Osrblie	Team event
Gold medal – first place	2000 Oslo	7.5 km sprint
Gold medal – first place	2000 Oslo	12.5 km mass start
Gold medal – first place	2001 Pokljuka	10 km pursuit
Gold medal – first place	2004 Oberhof	7.5 km sprint
Gold medal – first place	2004 Oberhof	10 km pursuit
Gold medal – first place	2004 Oberhof	12.5 km mass start
Gold medal – first place	2004 Oberhof	4 × 6 km relay
Silver medal – second place	1997 Brezno-Osrblie	4 × 6 km relay
Silver medal – second place	1998 Hochfilzen	Team event
Silver medal – second place	2001 Pokljuka	15 km individual
Bronze medal – third place	2001 Pokljuka	7.5 km sprint
Bronze medal – third place	2001 Pokljuka	12.5 km mass start

Liv Grete Skjelbreid (born 7 July 1974) is a former professional biathlete. She was born in the Øvre Hålandsdalen valley in Fusa Municipality (now Bjørnafjorden Municipality), near the city of Bergen in western Norway. On 20 March 2006, Liv Grete announced her retirement, effective at the end of the season which ended on 26 March at the Holmenkollen. She said that she was retiring because of her young daughter, Emma, her family and because she did not have the motivation to continue.

== Early career ==
As a child Skjelbreid spent a lot of her time with her older sisters, and consequently took part in the sports her sisters did. She played football, kayaked in the lake next to the family home, cross-country skied, and she used to run up to the family cottage up in the mountains, touch the wall and run back down.

Skjelbreid excelled in football and biathlon, and first started competing in biathlon when she was nine. She borrowed her father's rifle for her first race. He also built a small shooting range on the family's farm so his young daughters could practice. However, as she was finishing high school, she was undecided as to whether continue with biathlon or to become a hairdresser. She, then, received an offer from a new sports school, which developed young talent, based in Geilo, to train and study there, still she was undecided, but her friends and family succeeded in persuading her to attend the school, and that after the first year if she did not like it, she could then leave. It turned out that Skjelbreid did enjoy the school, and was in the same year as Ole Einar Bjørndalen, and was taught by Odd Lirhus, who would become her coach between 2003 and 2006.

== World Cup ==
Skjelbreid won the IBU overall World Cup once, in the 2003–04 season, it was also the first for Norway since Anne Elvebakk won the event in 1988. She won the overall title by 95 points over Olga Pyleva, and took three of the four individual disciplines, the sprint, pursuit and mass start. She came fourth in the individual. Norway also won the relay. Her first season was in 1995/96, she finished 30th. In her next season, 1998/99, she shot up the table and came 5th in the end. The year after however she finished 21st. In 2000/01 Skjelbreid finished the season in 2nd place, 217 points behind Magdalena Forsberg. She was 2nd in the sprint, pursuit and mass start, and came 3rd in the individual. Norway won the relay. She also came second the year after, again behind Forsberg, this time by 149 points. She was 2nd in the individual, sprint and pursuit, and 9th in the mass start. Norway came 2nd in the relay. Skjelbreid missed the 2002/03 season because of her pregnancy. However, the year after she captured the crystal globe of the World Cup. Although, 2004/05 was a poor year, Skjelbreid had to retire from the season due to illness, missing the World Championships in the process. She ended up in 22nd place, 532 points behind Sandrine Bailly. She was suffering from a virus closely related to mononucleosis (glandular fever). The virus took away about 15–20 percent of her energy according to Lars Kolsrud, doctor for Norway's biathlon squads.

Skjelbreid finished the 2005/06 season in 12th place, 511 points behind the overall winner Kati Wilhelm. She ended in 21st place in the individual, 64 points down on Svetlana Ishmouratova. She was 12th in the sprint, 190 behind Wilhelm. Her best standing was in the pursuit, where she finished the season in 9th place, 177 points behind Wilhelm, and she finished 13th in the mass start, with 90 points less than Martina Glagow. Norway were 4th in the relay.

Skjelbreid was a steady shooter over the years. Her overall percentage was in the high 70% – low 80%. As with the vast majority of biathletes, her prone shoot was her best, averaging mid 80% shooting, whilst her standing shoot gradually got better, from 65% in 1999/00 to 74% in the 2005/06 season. Skjelbreid achieved 46 podium finishes, 22 in first place, 15 in second, and 9 in third place.

Skjelbreid was coached by Rolf Sæterdal until 2003, when he died suddenly. Then she was coached by Odd Lirhus until 2006, when she retired.

Skjelbreid won the Holmenkollen ski festival biathlon competition four times with two wins each in sprint (2000, 2001) and in mass start (2000, 2004).

- 1 × Overall winner (2003/04)
- 3 × Discipline World Cup winner:

- Sprint (1): 2003/04

- Pursuit (): 2003/04

- Mass start (1): 2003/04

Season	Overall		Sprint		Pursuit		Individual		Mass start	
Season	Points	Position	Points	Position	Points	Position	Points	Position	Points	Position
1995–96	-	30th	–	–	–	–	–	–	–	–
1997–98	-	11th	–	–	–	–	–	–	–	–
1998–99	313	5th	–	–	–	–	–	–	–	–
1999–00	172	21st	–	–	–	–	–	–	–	–
2000–01	804	2nd	312	2nd	252	2nd	110	3rd	120	2nd
2001–02	795	2nd	262	2nd	327	2nd	133	2nd	62	9th
2003–04	955	1st	370	1st	327	1st	90	4th	139	1st
2004–05	315	22nd	116	22nd	140	15th	9	53rd	50	17th
2005–06	458	12th	178	12th	157	9th	36	21st	87	11th

=== Individual victories ===
22 victories (10 Sp, 8 Pu, 1 In, 3 MS)

Season	Date	Location	Discipline	Level
1998–99; 3 victories (2 Sp, 1 Pu)	8 January 1999	(Germany) Oberhof	7.5 km sprint	Biathlon World Cup
1998–99; 3 victories (2 Sp, 1 Pu)	9 January 1999	(Germany) Oberhof	10 km pursuit	Biathlon World Cup
1998–99; 3 victories (2 Sp, 1 Pu)	5 March 1999	(Canada) Valcartier	7.5 km sprint	Biathlon World Cup
1999–2000; 2 victories (1 Sp, 1 MS)	19 February 2000	(Norway) Oslo Holmenkollen	7.5 km sprint	Biathlon World Championships
1999–2000; 2 victories (1 Sp, 1 MS)	26 February 2000	(Norway) Oslo Holmenkollen	12.5 km mass start	Biathlon World Championships
2000–01; 2 victories (1 Sp, 1 Pu)	4 February 2001	(Slovenia) Pokljuka	10 km pursuit	Biathlon World Championships
2000–01; 2 victories (1 Sp, 1 Pu)	16 March 2001	(Norway) Oslo Holmenkollen	7.5 km sprint	Biathlon World Cup
2001–02; 6 victories (3 Sp, 2 Pu, 1 In)	10 January 2002	(Germany) Oberhof	7.5 km sprint	Biathlon World Cup
2001–02; 6 victories (3 Sp, 2 Pu, 1 In)	19 January 2002	(Germany) Ruhpolding	7.5 km sprint	Biathlon World Cup
2001–02; 6 victories (3 Sp, 2 Pu, 1 In)	20 January 2002	(Germany) Ruhpolding	10 km pursuit	Biathlon World Cup
2001–02; 6 victories (3 Sp, 2 Pu, 1 In)	23 January 2002	(Italy) Antholz-Anterselva	15 km individual	Biathlon World Cup
2001–02; 6 victories (3 Sp, 2 Pu, 1 In)	27 January 2002	(Italy) Antholz-Anterselva	10 km pursuit	Biathlon World Cup
2001–02; 6 victories (3 Sp, 2 Pu, 1 In)	9 March 2002	(Sweden) Östersund	7.5 km sprint	Biathlon World Cup
2003–04; 7 victories (3 Sp, 3 Pu, 1 MS)	7 December 2003	(Finland) Kontiolahti	10 km pursuit	Biathlon World Cup
2003–04; 7 victories (3 Sp, 3 Pu, 1 MS)	7 January 2004	(Slovenia) Pokljuka	7.5 km sprint	Biathlon World Cup
2003–04; 7 victories (3 Sp, 3 Pu, 1 MS)	16 January 2004	(Germany) Ruhpolding	7.5 km sprint	Biathlon World Cup
2003–04; 7 victories (3 Sp, 3 Pu, 1 MS)	18 January 2004	(Germany) Ruhpolding	10 km pursuit	Biathlon World Cup
2003–04; 7 victories (3 Sp, 3 Pu, 1 MS)	7 February 2004	(Germany) Oberhof	7.5 km sprint	Biathlon World Championships
2003–04; 7 victories (3 Sp, 3 Pu, 1 MS)	8 February 2004	(Germany) Oberhof	10 km pursuit	Biathlon World Championships
2003–04; 7 victories (3 Sp, 3 Pu, 1 MS)	14 February 2004	(Germany) Oberhof	12.5 km mass start	Biathlon World Championships
2004–05; 1 victory (1 MS)	19 December 2004	(Sweden) Östersund	12.5 km mass start	Biathlon World Cup
2005–06; 1 victory (1 Pu)	15 January 2006	(Germany) Ruhpolding	10 km pursuit	Biathlon World Cup

*Results are from IBU races which include the Biathlon World Cup, Biathlon World Championships and the Winter Olympic Games.

== Olympics ==
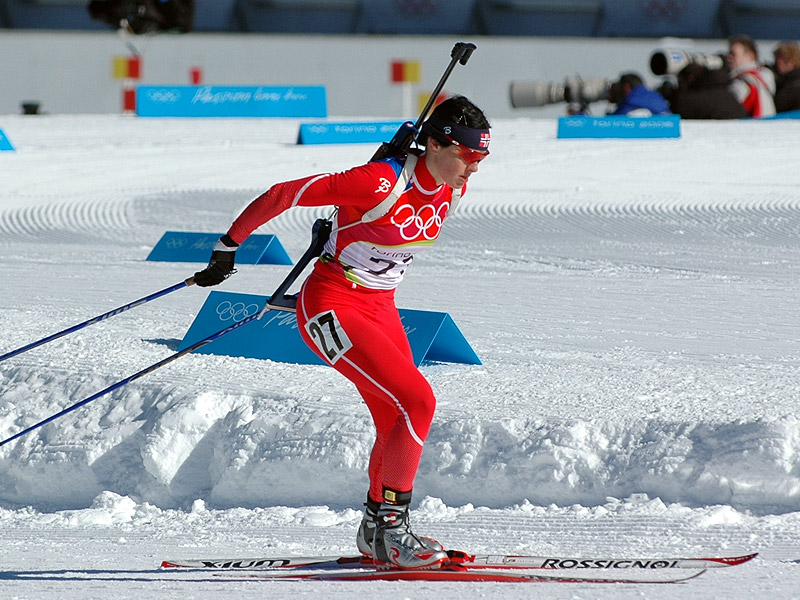
Liv Grete at the 2006 Winter Olympics

Skjelbreid competed in three Olympic games, the first in 1998 in Nagano. She has three medals, two silver and one bronze, two of them (one silver & one bronze) came in the relay (1998 and 2002), the other silver came in the individual in 2002. Her medal count, especially her solo medal count is quite poor for a biathlete of her calibre, though she did come fourth in both the sprint and the pursuit in 2002. Her 2006 results were poor, much in the same pattern as the Norwegian Olympic team on the whole. She finished 9th in the individual, 12th in the sprint, 6th in the pursuit, 18th in the mass start, and 5th in the relay (although Skjelbreid did run a solid anchor leg).

3 medals (2 silver, 1 bronze)

Event	Individual	Sprint	Pursuit	Mass start	Relay
(Japan) 1998 Nagano	15th	23rd	—N/a	—N/a	Bronze
(United States) 2002 Salt Lake City	Silver	4th	4th	—N/a	Silver
(Italy) 2006 Turin	9th	12th	6th	18th	5th

== World championships ==
Skjelbreid has 13 World Championship medals: 8 gold, three silver and two bronze. She won four of her gold medals in a single Championships, in Oberhof in 2004, the first time a biathlete has won four golds in a single World Championships. Her first World Championship medal was a silver in the relay in Brezno-Osrblie, Slovakia in 1997. She then had to wait until 2000 for her first individual medal. She won two golds in Holmenkollen, in the sprint and the mass start. In 2001 in Pokljuka, she won a gold in the pursuit, a silver in the individual, and a bronze in both the sprint and mass start. Her next Championships was in 2004, where she took the four golds. The one event she did not win was the individual where she finished eighth. She suffered from illness in the 2004–05 season, and came 37th in the sprint, and did not start in the pursuit. During the 2003–04 season, Skjelbreid was handed the wrong gold medal after she won Sunday's 7.5 km race. She was given the medal for the 15 km event, which wasn't taking place until Tuesday.

12 medals (8 gold, 3 silver, 2 bronze)

Event	Individual	Sprint	Pursuit	Mass start	Team	Relay	Mixed relay
(Germany) 1996 Ruhpolding	42nd	7th	—N/a	—N/a	12th	4th	—N/a
(Slovakia) 1997 Brezno-Osrblie	39th	39th	42nd	—N/a	Gold	Silver	—N/a
(Slovenia) 1998 Pokljuka	—N/a	—N/a	10th	—N/a	Silver	—N/a	—N/a
(Finland) 1999 Kontiolahti	28th	11th	10th	14th	—N/a	4th	—N/a
(Norway) 2000 Oslo	32nd	Gold	7th	Gold	—N/a	5th	—N/a
(Slovenia) 2001 Pokljuka	Silver	Bronze	Gold	Bronze	—N/a	4th	—N/a
(Norway) 2002 Oslo	—N/a	—N/a	—N/a	15th	—N/a	—N/a	—N/a
(Germany) 2004 Oberhof	8th	Gold	Gold	Gold	—N/a	Gold	—N/a
(Austria) 2005 Hochfilzen	—	37th	DNS	—	—N/a	—	—

*Team was removed as an event in 1998, and pursuit was added in 1997 with mass start being added in 1999 and the mixed relay in 2005.

== Injuries ==
Skjelbreid suffered a spate of injuries throughout her career. In the summer of 1995 she broke her wrist whilst swinging on monkey bars, then in the summer of 1997 she was jumping on a chair, fell and broke her elbow. She then broke the cast when she crashed while training on roller skis days later. She also has chronic inflammation, but she has said it had got better since she gave birth. There was also the illness that drained her energy and forced her to finish the 2004/05 season early.

== Personal life ==
Liv Grete Skjelbreid grew up on a dairy farm in the Hålandsdal valley in Fusa Municipality, near the village of Holdhus. One of her two sisters Ann Elen also had a career as a biathlete. Ann Elen skied the first leg of the relay in Nagano 1998 when Norway came third, with Liv Grete skiing the anchor leg. Her brother-in-law is Norwegian biathlete Egil Gjelland.

Skjelbreid married French biathlete Raphaël Poirée on 27 May 2000 in Norway. They first met at the 1992 Junior World Championships and began dating in 1996. They have three daughters, Emma (born 27 January 2003), Anna (born 10 January 2007) and Lena (born 10 October 2008). The family have spent most of their time in Norway and have a house in Eikelandsosen, near Skjelbreid's childhood home. They also kept a small apartment in Villard-de-Lans, France, site of the 1968 Olympic luge venue. In July 2013, the couple announced that they were separating.

The oldest daughter Emma traveled with the Poirées to all of their biathlon events, with a full-time nanny (older sister Ann Elen) for the first two years. But Emma was sick several times over those two seasons, and the family decided she should remain at home during the buildup to the Olympic games in Torino, and only travel with them every third race weekend. So during the 2006 Olympic season Emma stayed with her maternal grandparents.

== See also ==
- List of Olympic medalist families
