= Raphaël Poirée =

French biathlete (born 1974)

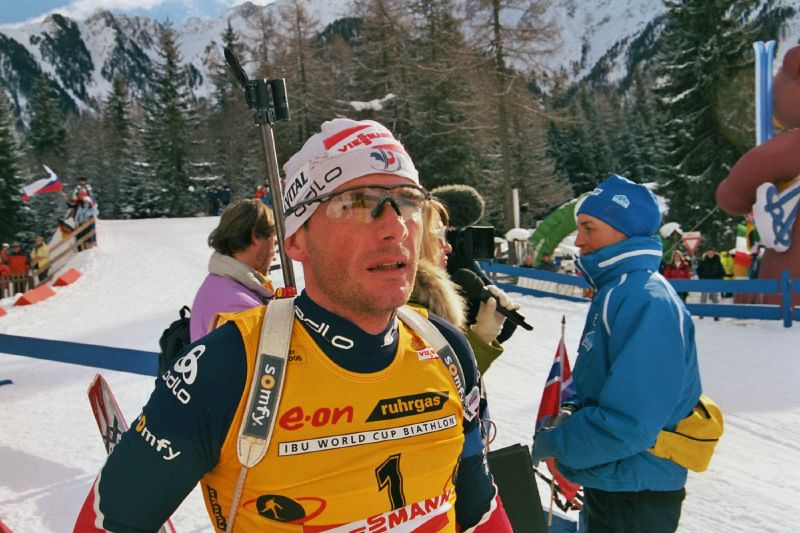
- Poirée in Antholz-Anterselva in 2006

Personal information
- Full name: Raphaël Poirée
- Born: 9 August 1974 (age 51) Rives, France
- Height: 1.74 m (5 ft 9 in)

Sport

Professional information
- Sport: Biathlon
- Club: Vercors Ski De Fond
- Skis: Rossignol
- World Cup debut: 9 March 1995
- Retired: 11 March 2007

Olympic Games
- Teams: 3 (1998, 2002, 2006)
- Medals: 3 (0 gold)

World Championships
- Teams: 12 (1996, 1997, 1998, 1999, 2000, 2001, 2002, 2003, 2004, 2005, 2006, 2007)
- Medals: 18 (8 gold)

World Cup
- Seasons: 13 (1995-2007)
- Individual races: 260
- All races: 313
- Individual victories: 44
- All victories: 46
- Individual podiums: 103
- All podiums: 118
- Overall titles: 4 (1999−00, 2000−01, 2001−02, 2003−04)
- Discipline titles: 10: 2 Individual (2003−04, 2006–07); 1 Sprint (2003−04); 4 Pursuit (1998−99, 2000−01, 2001−02, 2003−04); 3 Mass start (1999−00, 2003−04, 2004–05)
Medal record
Men's biathlon
Representing France
Event	1st	2nd	3rd
Olympic Games	0	1	2
World Championships	8	3	7
Total (21 medals)	8	4	9
Olympic Games
Silver medal – second place	2002 Salt Lake City	12.5 km pursuit
Bronze medal – third place	2002 Salt Lake City	4 × 7.5 km relay
Bronze medal – third place	2006 Turin	4 × 7.5 km relay
World Championships
Gold medal – first place	2000 Oslo	15 km mass start
Gold medal – first place	2001 Pokljuka	15 km mass start
Gold medal – first place	2001 Pokljuka	4 × 7.5 km relay
Gold medal – first place	2002 Oslo	15 km mass start
Gold medal – first place	2004 Oberhof	20 km individual
Gold medal – first place	2004 Oberhof	10 km sprint
Gold medal – first place	2004 Oberhof	15 km mass start
Gold medal – first place	2007 Antholz-Anterselva	20 km individual
Silver medal – second place	2001 Pokljuka	12.5 km pursuit
Silver medal – second place	2004 Oberhof	12.5 km pursuit
Silver medal – second place	2007 Antholz-Anterselva	Mixed relay
Bronze medal – third place	1998 Pokljuka	12.5 km pursuit
Bronze medal – third place	2000 Oslo	12.5 km pursuit
Bronze medal – third place	2003 Khanty-Mansiysk	15 km mass start
Bronze medal – third place	2004 Oberhof	4 × 7.5 km relay
Bronze medal – third place	2005 Hochfilzen	15 km mass start
Bronze medal – third place	2006 Pokljuka	Mixed relay
Bronze medal – third place	2007 Antholz-Anterselva	15 km mass start

Raphaël Poirée (born 9 August 1974) is a retired French biathlete who was active from 1995 to 2007. With his 44 World Cup victories and several World Championship medals he ranks among the most successful biathletes ever.

== Sports career ==
Poirée was born in Rives, Isère in France and like the rest of his colleagues in the French biathlon and cross-country skiing team, was a sport soldier.

Poirée has four IBU World Cup titles (1999−00, 2000−01, 2001−02 and 2003−04). He has also come second once, in 2005−06 and third once, in the 2004−05 season. Poirée has had 103 World Cup podium finishes, 44 in first place, 39 in second, and has come third 20 times. In the Winter Olympics, Poiree has one silver and two bronze medals. At the World Championships however, he has seven gold medals, three silver and seven bronze.

Raphaël Poirée was one of the best mass start biathletes of his time, with 9 1st places, 4 2nd places, and 3 3rd places in his World Cup career, second only to Ole Einar Bjørndalen who got 10 1st places, 5 2nd places and 4 3rd places in the same time frame. Poirée also won 4 out of the 7 World Championship mass start races he took part in.

Poirée also had five victories at the Holmenkollen ski festival biathlon competition with three mass starts (2000, 2002, and 2004), one pursuit (2004) and one individual (2007).

After winning the gold medal at the World Championships in Antholz in 2007, Poiree announced the end of his career after that World Cup season. He eventually chose to retire after the Holmenkollen World Cup meet (i.e. before the season's last WC meet, in Khanty-Mansyisk in Russia the week after); his last competition was the Mass start race on Sunday 11 March, where he finished in second place after a cm-close last sprint to the finish line against his long-time competitor Ole Einar Bjørndalen of Norway.

== Personal life ==
He married Norwegian biathlete Liv Grete Skjelbreid Poirée on 27 May 2000 in Norway. They first met at the 1992 Junior World Championships and began dating in 1996. They have three daughters together, Emma (born 27 January 2003), Anna (born 10 January 2007) and Lena (born 10 October 2008). They have a flat in La Chapelle-en-Vercors, France, but live mostly in Liv Grete's home village in the Hålandsdal area of Bjørnafjorden Municipality in Norway. The Poirées are the only husband and wife to win medals in the same Olympics for different nations. At the 2002 Winter Olympics, France's Raphaël and Norway's Liv won matching silver medals in the biathlon. In July 2013, the couple announced that they were separating.

In 2009, Poirée was involved in a quad-bike accident which nearly left him paralysed. One month after undergoing neck and back surgery he was released from hospital.

He speaks French, English, Norwegian and Italian

== Biathlon results ==
All results are sourced from the International Biathlon Union.

=== Olympic Games ===
3 medals (1 silver, 2 bronze)

Event	Individual	Sprint	Pursuit	Mass start	Relay
(Japan) 1998 Nagano	22nd	DNF	—N/a	—N/a	7th
(United States) 2002 Salt Lake City	10th	9th	Silver	—N/a	Bronze
(Italy) 2006 Turin	20th	8th	DNF	12th	Bronze

*Pursuit was added as an event in 2002, with mass start being added in 2006.

=== World Championships ===
18 medals (8 gold, 3 silver, 7 bronze)

Event	Individual	Sprint	Pursuit	Mass start	Team	Relay	Mixed relay
(Germany) 1996 Ruhpolding	67th	23rd	—N/a	—N/a	10th	5th	—N/a
(Slovakia) 1997 Brezno-Osrblie	14th	59th	—	—N/a	7th	5th	—N/a
(Slovenia) 1998 Pokljuka	—N/a	—N/a	Bronze	—N/a	7th	—N/a	—N/a
(Finland) 1999 Kontiolahti	19th	26th	11th	9th	—N/a	12th	—N/a
(Norway) 2000 Oslo Holmenkollen	4th	6th	Bronze	Gold	—N/a	10th	—N/a
(Slovenia) 2001 Pokljuka	37th	7th	Silver	Gold	—N/a	Gold	—N/a
(Norway) 2002 Oslo Holmenkollen	—N/a	—N/a	—N/a	Gold	—N/a	—N/a	—N/a
(Russia) 2003 Khanty-Mansiysk	7th	DNF	—	Bronze	—N/a	13th	—N/a
(Germany) 2004 Oberhof	Gold	Gold	Silver	Gold	—N/a	Bronze	—N/a
(Austria) 2005 Hochfilzen	8th	13th	9th	Bronze	—N/a	5th	6th
(Slovenia) 2006 Pokljuka	—N/a	—N/a	—N/a	—N/a	—N/a	—N/a	Bronze
(Italy) 2007 Antholz-Anterselva	Gold	8th	6th	Bronze	—N/a	—	Silver

*During Olympic seasons competitions are only held for those events not included in the Olympic program.
**Team was removed as an event in 1998, and pursuit was added in 1997 with mass start being added in 1999 and the mixed relay in 2005.

=== World Cup ===
Season	Age	Overall		Individual		Sprint		Pursuit		Mass start	
Season	Age	Points	Position	Points	Position	Points	Position	Points	Position	Points	Position
1994–95	20	0	—N/a	0	—N/a	0	—N/a	—N/a	—N/a	—N/a	—N/a
1995–96	21	108	17th	59	14th	49	20th	—N/a	—N/a	—N/a	—N/a
1996–97	22	150	16th	29	26th	87	13th	34	12th	—N/a	—N/a
1997–98	23	249	5th	42	12th	161	2nd	46	7th	—N/a	—N/a
1998–99	24	365	5th	26	15th	107	11th	185	1st	47	2nd
1999–00	25	470	1st	68	2nd	153	3rd	172	3rd	77	1st
2000–01	26	921	1st	83	7th	375	2nd	278	1st	136	3rd
2001–02	27	805	1st	88	5th	233	3rd	362	1st	100	2nd
2002–03	28	591	4th	32	23rd	226	4th	199	3rd	114	3rd
2003–04	29	1010	1st	146	1st	358	1st	331	1st	140	1st
2004–05	30	869	3rd	99	6th	277	3rd	374	3rd	146	1st
2005–06	31	695	2nd	83	3rd	245	3rd	200	3rd	157	2nd
2006–07	32	709	3rd	150	1st	207	6th	173	7th	147	3rd

*Pursuit was added as an event in the 1996–97 season, and mass start was added in the 1998–99 season.

=== Individual victories ===
44 victories (7 In, 13 Sp, 15 Pu, 9 MS)

Season	Date	Location	Discipline	Level
1997–98; 1 victory (1 Sp)	8 January 1998	(Germany) Ruhpolding	10 km sprint	Biathlon World Cup
1998–99; 4 victories (3 Pu, 1 MS)	12 December 1998	(Austria) Hochfilzen	12.5 km pursuit	Biathlon World Cup
1998–99; 4 victories (3 Pu, 1 MS)	13 January 1999	(Germany) Ruhpolding	15 km mass start	Biathlon World Cup
1998–99; 4 victories (3 Pu, 1 MS)	17 January 1999	(Germany) Ruhpolding	12.5 km pursuit	Biathlon World Cup
1998–99; 4 victories (3 Pu, 1 MS)	27 February 1999	(United States) Lake Placid	12.5 km pursuit	Biathlon World Cup
1999–2000; 3 victories (1 In, 1 Sp, 1 MS)	15 December 1999	(Slovenia) Pokljuka	20 km individual	Biathlon World Cup
1999–2000; 3 victories (1 In, 1 Sp, 1 MS)	20 January 2000	(Italy) Antholz-Anterselva	10 km sprint	Biathlon World Cup
1999–2000; 3 victories (1 In, 1 Sp, 1 MS)	26 February 2000	(Norway) Oslo Holmenkollen	15 km mass start	Biathlon World Championships
2000–01; 6 victories (3 Sp, 2 Pu, 1 MS)	7 December 2000	(Italy) Antholz-Anterselva	10 km sprint	Biathlon World Cup
2000–01; 6 victories (3 Sp, 2 Pu, 1 MS)	8 December 2000	(Italy) Antholz-Anterselva	12.5 km pursuit	Biathlon World Cup
2000–01; 6 victories (3 Sp, 2 Pu, 1 MS)	15 December 2000	(Italy) Antholz-Anterselva	10 km sprint	Biathlon World Cup
2000–01; 6 victories (3 Sp, 2 Pu, 1 MS)	4 January 2001	(Germany) Oberhof	10 km sprint	Biathlon World Cup
2000–01; 6 victories (3 Sp, 2 Pu, 1 MS)	14 January 2001	(Germany) Ruhpolding	12.5 km pursuit	Biathlon World Cup
2000–01; 6 victories (3 Sp, 2 Pu, 1 MS)	9 February 2001	(Slovenia) Pokljuka	15 km mass start	Biathlon World Championships
2001–02; 7 victories (2 Sp, 3 Pu, 2 MS)	16 December 2001	(Slovenia) Pokljuka	12.5 km pursuit	Biathlon World Cup
2001–02; 7 victories (2 Sp, 3 Pu, 2 MS)	12 January 2002	(Germany) Oberhof	15 km mass start	Biathlon World Cup
2001–02; 7 victories (2 Sp, 3 Pu, 2 MS)	18 January 2002	(Germany) Ruhpolding	10 km sprint	Biathlon World Cup
2001–02; 7 victories (2 Sp, 3 Pu, 2 MS)	27 January 2002	(Italy) Antholz-Anterselva	12.5 km pursuit	Biathlon World Cup
2001–02; 7 victories (2 Sp, 3 Pu, 2 MS)	14 March 2002	(Finland) Lahti	10 km sprint	Biathlon World Cup
2001–02; 7 victories (2 Sp, 3 Pu, 2 MS)	17 March 2002	(Finland) Lahti	12.5 km pursuit	Biathlon World Cup
2001–02; 7 victories (2 Sp, 3 Pu, 2 MS)	24 March 2002	(Norway) Oslo Holmenkollen	15 km mass start	Biathlon World Championships
2002–03; 2 victories (1 Sp, 1 Pu)	19 December 2002	(Slovakia) Brezno-Osrblie	10 km sprint	Biathlon World Cup
2002–03; 2 victories (1 Sp, 1 Pu)	22 December 2002	(Slovakia) Brezno-Osrblie	12.5 km pursuit	Biathlon World Cup
2003–04; 11 victories (2 In, 3 Sp, 4 Pu, 2 MS)	18 December 2003	(Slovakia) Brezno-Osrblie	20 km individual	Biathlon World Cup
2003–04; 11 victories (2 In, 3 Sp, 4 Pu, 2 MS)	21 December 2003	(Slovakia) Brezno-Osrblie	12.5 km pursuit	Biathlon World Cup
2003–04; 11 victories (2 In, 3 Sp, 4 Pu, 2 MS)	8 January 2004	(Slovenia) Pokljuka	10 km sprint	Biathlon World Cup
2003–04; 11 victories (2 In, 3 Sp, 4 Pu, 2 MS)	25 January 2004	(Italy) Antholz-Anterselva	15 km mass start	Biathlon World Cup
2003–04; 11 victories (2 In, 3 Sp, 4 Pu, 2 MS)	7 February 2004	(Germany) Oberhof	10 km sprint	Biathlon World Championships
2003–04; 11 victories (2 In, 3 Sp, 4 Pu, 2 MS)	12 February 2004	(Germany) Oberhof	20 km individual	Biathlon World Championships
2003–04; 11 victories (2 In, 3 Sp, 4 Pu, 2 MS)	15 February 2004	(Germany) Oberhof	15 km mass start	Biathlon World Championships
2003–04; 11 victories (2 In, 3 Sp, 4 Pu, 2 MS)	29 February 2004	(United States) Lake Placid	12.5 km pursuit	Biathlon World Cup
2003–04; 11 victories (2 In, 3 Sp, 4 Pu, 2 MS)	4 March 2004	(United States) Fort Kent	10 km sprint	Biathlon World Cup
2003–04; 11 victories (2 In, 3 Sp, 4 Pu, 2 MS)	5 March 2004	(United States) Fort Kent	12.5 km pursuit	Biathlon World Cup
2003–04; 11 victories (2 In, 3 Sp, 4 Pu, 2 MS)	13 March 2004	(Norway) Oslo Holmenkollen	12.5 km pursuit	Biathlon World Cup
2004–05; 3 victories (1 Pu, 2 MS)	19 December 2004	(Sweden) Östersund	15 km mass start	Biathlon World Cup
2004–05; 3 victories (1 Pu, 2 MS)	9 January 2005	(Germany) Oberhof	12.5 km pursuit	Biathlon World Cup
2004–05; 3 victories (1 Pu, 2 MS)	19 March 2005	(Russia) Khanty-Mansiysk	15 km mass start	Biathlon World Cup
2005–06; 1 victory (1 In)	8 December 2005	(Austria) Hochfilzen	20 km individual	Biathlon World Cup
2006–07; 6 victories (3 In, 2 Sp, 1 Pu)	14 December 2006	(Austria) Hochfilzen	10 km sprint	Biathlon World Cup
2006–07; 6 victories (3 In, 2 Sp, 1 Pu)	6 February 2007	(Italy) Antholz-Anterselva	20 km individual	Biathlon World Championships
2006–07; 6 victories (3 In, 2 Sp, 1 Pu)	1 March 2007	(Finland) Lahti	20 km individual	Biathlon World Cup
2006–07; 6 victories (3 In, 2 Sp, 1 Pu)	3 March 2007	(Finland) Lahti	10 km sprint	Biathlon World Cup
2006–07; 6 victories (3 In, 2 Sp, 1 Pu)	4 March 2007	(Finland) Lahti	12.5 km pursuit	Biathlon World Cup
2006–07; 6 victories (3 In, 2 Sp, 1 Pu)	8 March 2007	(Norway) Oslo Holmenkollen	20 km individual	Biathlon World Cup

*Results are from UIPMB and IBU races which include the Biathlon World Cup, Biathlon World Championships and the Winter Olympic Games.

== See also ==
- List of Olympic medalist families
