= Biathlon World Championships 2000 =

Sports competition in Oslo, Norway

The 35th Biathlon World Championships were held for the second time in Oslo, Norway from 19 February to 26 February 2000. Due to fog, the men's relay was moved to Lahti, Finland on March 11.

== Men's results ==
=== 20 km individual ===
- Date / Start Time: Wed February 23, 2000 / 13:00 CET

Place	Name	Nation	Penalties	Result	Behind
1st place, gold medalist(s)	Wolfgang Rottmann	AUT	0+0+0+1	53:36.2	
2nd place, silver medalist(s)	Ludwig Gredler	AUT	0+1+0+1	54:11.2	+35.0
3rd place, bronze medalist(s)	Frank Luck	GER	0+0+0+1	54:58.1	+1:21.9
4	Raphaël Poirée	FRA	1+0+0+1	55:00.7	+1:24.5
5	Alexei Aidarov	BLR	1+0+0+0	55:02.9	+1:26.7
6	Peter Sendel	GER	1+0+0+0	55:08.5	+1:32.3
7	Marek Matiaško	SVK	0+0+0+0	55:32.7	+1:56.5
8	Alexander Wolf	GER	1+1+0+0	55:43.0	+2:06.8
9	Ricco Groß	GER	2+0+0+0	55:51.5	+2:15.3
10	Halvard Hanevold	NOR	1+0+0+0	56:23.3	+2:47.1

=== 10 km sprint ===
- Date / Start Time: Sat February 19, 2000 / 13:00 CET

Place	Name	Nation	Penalties	Result	Behind
1st place, gold medalist(s)	Frode Andresen	NOR	0+1	23:51.2	
2nd place, silver medalist(s)	Pavel Rostovtsev	RUS	0+0	24:00.7	+9.5
3rd place, bronze medalist(s)	René Cattarinussi	ITA	0+0	24:10.4	+19.2
4	Frank Luck	GER	1+0	24:10,8	+19.6
5	Ole Einar Bjørndalen	NOR	1+1	24:18.6	+27.4
6	Raphaël Poirée	FRA	0+1	24:18.7	+27.5
7	Ricco Groß	GER	0+1	24:19.3	+28.1
8	Peter Sendel	GER	0+0	24:22.6	+31.4
9	Sergei Rozhkov	RUS	0+0	24:31.8	+40.6
10	Paavo Puurunen	FIN	0+0	24:34.3	+43.1

=== 12.5 km pursuit ===
- Date / Start Time: Sun February 20, 2000 / 13:00 CET

Place	Name	Nation	Penalties	Result	Behind
1st place, gold medalist(s)	Frank Luck	GER	1+0+0+1	33:21.9	
2nd place, silver medalist(s)	Pavel Rostovtsev	RUS	0+1+1+0	33:25.2	+3.3
3rd place, bronze medalist(s)	Raphaël Poirée	FRA	0+1+1+1	33:37.0	+15.1
4	Ole Einar Bjørndalen	NOR	1+1+1+1	33:37.0	+26.9
5	Halvard Hanevold	NOR	2+0+0+0	33:57.2	+35.3
6	Frode Andresen	NOR	1+0+3+2	34:08.2	+46.3
7	Oļegs Maļuhins	LAT	3+0+0+0	34:08.9	+47.0
8	René Cattarinussi	ITA	1+0+0+1	34:27.9	+1:06.0
9	Ludwig Gredler	AUT	2+2+0+1	34:36.3	+1:14.4
10	Alexei Aidarov	BLR	2+0+1+0	34:42.3	+1:20.4

=== 15 km mass start ===
- Date / Start Time: Sat February 26, 2000 / 11:00 CET

Place	Name	Nation	Penalties	Result	Behind
1st place, gold medalist(s)	Raphaël Poirée	FRA	0+0+1+0	39:31.5	
2nd place, silver medalist(s)	Pavel Rostovtsev	RUS	0+1+1+0	39:40.9	+9.4
3rd place, bronze medalist(s)	Ole Einar Bjørndalen	NOR	0+2+1+0	39:49.9	+18.4
4	Peter Sendel	GER	2+0+0+0	40:12.6	+41.1
5	Wolfgang Rottmann	AUT	0+1+1+1	40:22.1	+50.6
6	Ricco Groß	GER	0+1+0+0	40:32.3	+1:00.8
7	Oļegs Maļuhins	LAT	0+1+0+2	40:32.5	+1:01.0
8	Paavo Puurunen	FIN	1+0+0+0	40:33.2	+1:01.7
9	Wolfgang Perner	AUT	0+1+1+1	40:37.9	+1:06.4
10	Halvard Hanevold	NOR	1+0+1+1	40:45.4	+1:13.9

=== 4 × 7.5 km relay ===
- Date / Start Time: Sat March 11, 2000 / 14:00 CET

Place	Name	Nation	Penalties	Result	Behind
1st place, gold medalist(s)	Viktor Maigourov; Sergei Rozhkov; Vladimir Drachev; Pavel Rostovtsev	RUS	0+3 0+3; 1+3 0+0; 0+0 0+2; 0+0 0+0	1:33:39.6	
2nd place, silver medalist(s)	Egil Gjelland; Frode Andresen; Halvard Hanevold; Ole Einar Bjørndalen	NOR	0+0 0+1; 1+3 0+3; 0+1 0+1; 0+1 0+0	1:34:19.6	+39.8
3rd place, bronze medalist(s)	Frank Luck; Peter Sendel; Sven Fischer; Ricco Groß	GER	0+0 0+2; 0+3 1+3; 1+3 0+0; 0+0 0+0	1:34:33.4	+53.6
4	Alexei Aidarov; Rustam Valiullin; Vadim Sashurin; Oleg Ryzhenkov	BLR	0+3 0+1; 0+3 0+0; 0+1 0+0; 0+1 0+3	1:35:01.8	+1:22.0
5	Helmuth Messner; René Cattarinussi; Wilfried Pallhuber; Devis Da Canal	ITA	0+2 1+3; 0+1 0+0; 0+0 0+3; 0+0 0+3	1:35:16.8	+1:37.0
6	Oļegs Maļuhins; Jekabs Nakums; Gundars Upenieks; Ilmārs Bricis	LAT	0+1 0+1; 0+0 0+2; 0+2 0+0; 0+3 0+2	1:35:29.5	+1:49.7

== Women's results ==
=== 15 km individual ===
- Date / Start Time: Tue February 22, 2000 / 13:00 CET

Place	Name	Nation	Penalties	Result	Behind
1st place, gold medalist(s)	Corinne Niogret	FRA	0+0+0+0	45:30.9	
2nd place, silver medalist(s)	Yu Shumei	CHN	0+0+0+0	46:24.2	+53.3
3rd place, bronze medalist(s)	Magdalena Forsberg	SWE	0+1+0+1	46:47.8	+1:16.9
4	Tamami Tanaka	JPN	0+0+0+1	47:15.1	+1:44.2
5	Martina Halinárová	SVK	0+0+0+0	47:15.3	+1:44.4
6	Katrin Apel	GER	1+2+0+0	47:21.1	+1:50.4
7	Olena Petrova	UKR	0+1+0+1	47:37.8	+2:06.9
8	Uschi Disl	GER	1+0+2+0	47:41.6	+2:10.7
9	Olena Zubrilova	UKR	1+0+1+1	47:44.6	+2:13.7
10	Irina Tananaiko	BLR	0+0+0+0	48:03.6	+2:32.7

=== 7.5 km sprint ===
- Date / Start Time: Sat February 19, 2000 / 10:30 CET

Place	Name	Nation	Penalties	Result	Behind
1st place, gold medalist(s)	Liv Grete Skjelbreid	NOR	0+0	20:51.9	
2nd place, silver medalist(s)	Katrin Apel	GER	0+1	21:21.7	+29.8
3rd place, bronze medalist(s)	Martina Zellner	GER	1+0	21:22.5	+30.6
4	Magdalena Forsberg	SWE	1+0	21:39.8	+47.9
4	Svetlana Ishmouratova	RUS	1+0	21:39.8	+47.9
6	Svetlana Tchernusova	RUS	0+1	21:43.7	+51.8
7	Uschi Disl	GER	0+1	21:47.1	+55.2
8	Andrea Henkel	GER	0+0	21:50.9	+59.0
9	Svetlana Paramygina	BLR	0+0	21:54.7	+1:02.8
10	Irina Nikulchina	BUL	1+0	22:07.5	+1:15.6

=== 10 km pursuit ===
- Date / Start Time: Sun February 20, 2000 / 10:30 CET

Place	Name	Nation	Penalties	Result	Behind
1st place, gold medalist(s)	Magdalena Forsberg	SWE	1+0+0+1	31:53.8	
2nd place, silver medalist(s)	Uschi Disl	GER	0+1+2+0	32:25.7	+31.9
3rd place, bronze medalist(s)	Florence Baverel	FRA	0+0+0+0	32:36.2	+42.4
4	Katrin Apel	GER	2+1+2+1	32:55.9	+1:02.1
5	Andrea Henkel	GER	1+0+2+0	32:59.5	+1:05.7
6	Martina Zellner	GER	2+2+1+1	33:00.1	+1:06.3
7	Liv Grete Skjelbreid	NOR	3+1+1+2	33:18.5	+1:24.7
8	Svetlana Tchernusova	RUS	1+0+1+2	33:26.7	+1:32.9
9	Galina Koukleva	RUS	0+4+1+1	33:30.1	+1:36.3
10	Yu Shumei	CHN	1+1+0+0	33:36.4	+1:42.6

=== 12.5 km mass start ===
- Date / Start Time: Sat February 26, 2000 / 13:00 CET

Place	Name	Nation	Penalties	Result	Behind
1st place, gold medalist(s)	Liv Grete Skjelbreid	NOR	0+1+1+0	38:51.7	
2nd place, silver medalist(s)	Galina Koukleva	RUS	0+0+1+1	39:05.1	+13.4
3rd place, bronze medalist(s)	Corinne Niogret	FRA	0+0+1+1	39:15.3	+23.6
4	Magdalena Forsberg	SWE	1+1+0+1	39:24.1	+32.4
5	Katrin Apel	GER	0+0+2+1	39:25.1	+33.4
6	Irina Nikulchina	BUL	1+0+1+0	39:27.3	+35.6
7	Martina Zellner	GER	1+0+1+2	39:53.4	+1:01.7
8	Uschi Disl	GER	1+1+2+0	39:56.9	+1:05.2
9	Svetlana Ishmouratova	RUS	1+1+1+1	39:58.4	+1:06.7
10	Florence Baverel	FRA	0+0+0+0	40:01.6	+1:09.9

=== 4 × 7.5 km relay ===
- Date / Start Time: Fri February 25, 2000 / 13:00 CET

Place	Name	Nation	Penalties	Result	Behind
1st place, gold medalist(s)	Olga Pyleva; Svetlana Tchernusova; Galina Koukleva; Albina Akhatova	RUS	0+0 0+3; 0+0 0+3; 0+3 1+3; 0+2 0+0	1:32.19.8	
2nd place, silver medalist(s)	Uschi Disl; Katrin Apel; Andrea Henkel; Martina Zellner	GER	0+0 0+3; 0+2 0+2; 0+1 0+2; 1+3 0+2	1:32:42.5	+22.7
3rd place, bronze medalist(s)	Olena Zubrilova; Olena Petrova; Nina Lemesh; Tetyana Vodopyanova	UKR	1+3 0+3; 0+1 0+2; 0+1 0+0; 0+2 0+0	1:34:07.9	+1:48.1
4	Delphyne Burlet; Christelle Gros; Florence Baverel; Corinne Niogret	FRA	1+3 0+1; 0+0 1+3; 0+0 0+2; 0+0 0+1	1:34:40.0	+2:20.2
5	Gro Marit Istad; Ann-Elen Skjelbreid; Liv Grete Skjelbreid; Gunn Margit Andreassen	NOR	2+3 0+3; 0+0 0+2; 1+3 0+2; 0+3 0+0	1:35:13.1	+2:53.3
6	Pavlina Filipova; Irina Nikulchina; Radka Popova; Iva Karagiozova	BUL	0+3 0+2; 0+1 0+2; 0+3 0+0; 0+1 0+1	1:35:40.0	+3:20.2

== Medal table ==
Rank	Nation	Gold	Silver	Bronze	Total
1	Norway (NOR)	3	1	1	5
2	Russia (RUS)	2	4	0	6
3	France (FRA)	2	0	3	5
4	Germany (GER)	1	3	3	7
5	Austria (AUT)	1	1	0	2
6	Sweden (SWE)	1	0	1	2
7	China (CHN)	0	1	0	1
8	Italy (ITA)	0	0	1	1
8	Ukraine (UKR)	0	0	1	1
Totals (9 entries)		10	10	10	30
