= Wolfgang Rottmann =

Austrian biathlete (born 1973)

Medal record

Men's biathlon

Representing Austria

World Championships
Gold medal – first place	2000 Oslo	20 km individual
Bronze medal – third place	2005 Hochfilzen	4 × 7.5 km relay

Wolfgang Rottmann (born 15 May 1973 in Altenmarkt im Pongau) is a former biathlete from Austria.

As the result of a doping scandal at the 2006 Winter Olympics, the IOC banned Rottmann for life from competing in the Olympics.

== Career ==
- World Championships
  - 2000 - gold medal on the 20 km
  - 2005 - bronze medal on the relay
