= Ferréol Cannard =

French biathlete (born 1978)

Medal record

Men's biathlon

Representing France

Olympic Games
Bronze medal – third place	2006 Turin	4 × 7.5 km relay

World Championships
Bronze medal – third place	2004 Oberhof	4 × 7.5 km relay

Ferréol Cannard (born 28 May 1978 in Morez) is a retired French biathlete. He celebrated his biggest triumphs with the French relay team at the 2006 Olympics in Turin, where he won a bronze medal with the French relay team. He also got a bronze medal with the French team at the World Championships 2004 in Oberhof.
