= Biathlon World Championships 2004 =

Sports competition in Oberhof, Germany

- Host city: Oberhof, Thuringia
- Country: Germany
- Events: 8
- Opening: 7 February 2004
- Closing: 15 February 2004

The 39th Biathlon World Championships were held in 2004 in Oberhof, Germany.

== Men's results ==
=== 20 km individual ===
Medal	Name	Nation	Penalties	Result
1st place, gold medalist(s)	Raphaël Poirée	FRA		
2nd place, silver medalist(s)	Tomasz Sikora	POL		
3rd place, bronze medalist(s)	Ole Einar Bjørndalen	NOR		

=== 10 km sprint ===
Medal	Name	Nation	Penalties	Result
1st place, gold medalist(s)	Raphaël Poirée	FRA		
2nd place, silver medalist(s)	Ricco Groß	GER		
3rd place, bronze medalist(s)	Ole Einar Bjørndalen	NOR		

=== 12.5 km pursuit ===
Medal	Name	Nation	Penalties	Result
1st place, gold medalist(s)	Ricco Groß	GER		
2nd place, silver medalist(s)	Raphaël Poirée	FRA		
3rd place, bronze medalist(s)	Ole Einar Bjørndalen	NOR		

=== 15 km mass start ===
Medal	Name	Nation	Penalties	Result
1st place, gold medalist(s)	Raphaël Poirée	FRA		
2nd place, silver medalist(s)	Lars Berger	NOR		
3rd place, bronze medalist(s)	Sergei Konovalov	RUS		

=== 4 × 7.5 km relay ===
Medal	Name	Nation	Penalties	Result
1st place, gold medalist(s)	Germany Frank Luck; Ricco Groß; Sven Fischer; Michael Greis	GER		
2nd place, silver medalist(s)	Norway Halvard Hanevold; Lars Berger; Egil Gjelland; Ole Einar Bjørndalen	NOR		
3rd place, bronze medalist(s)	France Ferréol Cannard; Vincent Defrasne; Julien Robert; Raphaël Poirée	FRA		

== Women's results ==
=== 15 km individual ===
Medal	Name	Nation	Penalties	Result
1st place, gold medalist(s)	Olga Pyleva	RUS		
2nd place, silver medalist(s)	Albina Akhatova	RUS		
3rd place, bronze medalist(s)	Olena Petrova	UKR		

=== 7.5 km sprint ===
Medal	Name	Nation	Penalties	Result
1st place, gold medalist(s)	Liv Grete Poirée	NOR		
2nd place, silver medalist(s)	Anna Bogaliy	RUS		
3rd place, bronze medalist(s)	Martina Glagow	GER		
3rd place, bronze medalist(s)	Ekaterina Ivanova	BLR		

=== 10 km pursuit ===
Medal	Name	Nation	Penalties	Result
1st place, gold medalist(s)	Liv Grete Poirée	NOR		
2nd place, silver medalist(s)	Martina Glagow	GER		
3rd place, bronze medalist(s)	Anna Bogaliy	RUS		

=== 12.5 km mass start ===
Medal	Name	Nation	Penalties	Result
1st place, gold medalist(s)	Liv Grete Poirée	NOR		
2nd place, silver medalist(s)	Katrin Apel	GER		
3rd place, bronze medalist(s)	Sandrine Bailly	FRA		

=== 4 × 6 km relay ===
Medal	Name	Nation	Penalties	Result
1st place, gold medalist(s)	Norway Linda Tjörhom; Gro Marit Istad Kristiansen; Gunn Margit Andreassen; Liv Grete Poirée	NOR		
2nd place, silver medalist(s)	Russia Olga Pylyova; Svetlana Ishmouratova; Anna Bogaliy; Albina Akhatova	RUS		
3rd place, bronze medalist(s)	Germany Martina Glagow; Katrin Apel; Simone Denkinger; Kati Wilhelm	GER		

== Medal table ==
Place	Nation	1st place, gold medalist(s)	2nd place, silver medalist(s)	3rd place, bronze medalist(s)	Total
1	Norway	4	2	3	9
2	France	3	1	2	6
3	Germany	2	3	2	7
4	Russia	1	3	2	6
5	Poland	0	1	0	1
6	Belarus	0	0	1	1
6	Ukraine	0	0	1	1
