= Peter Sendel =

German biathlete (born 1972)

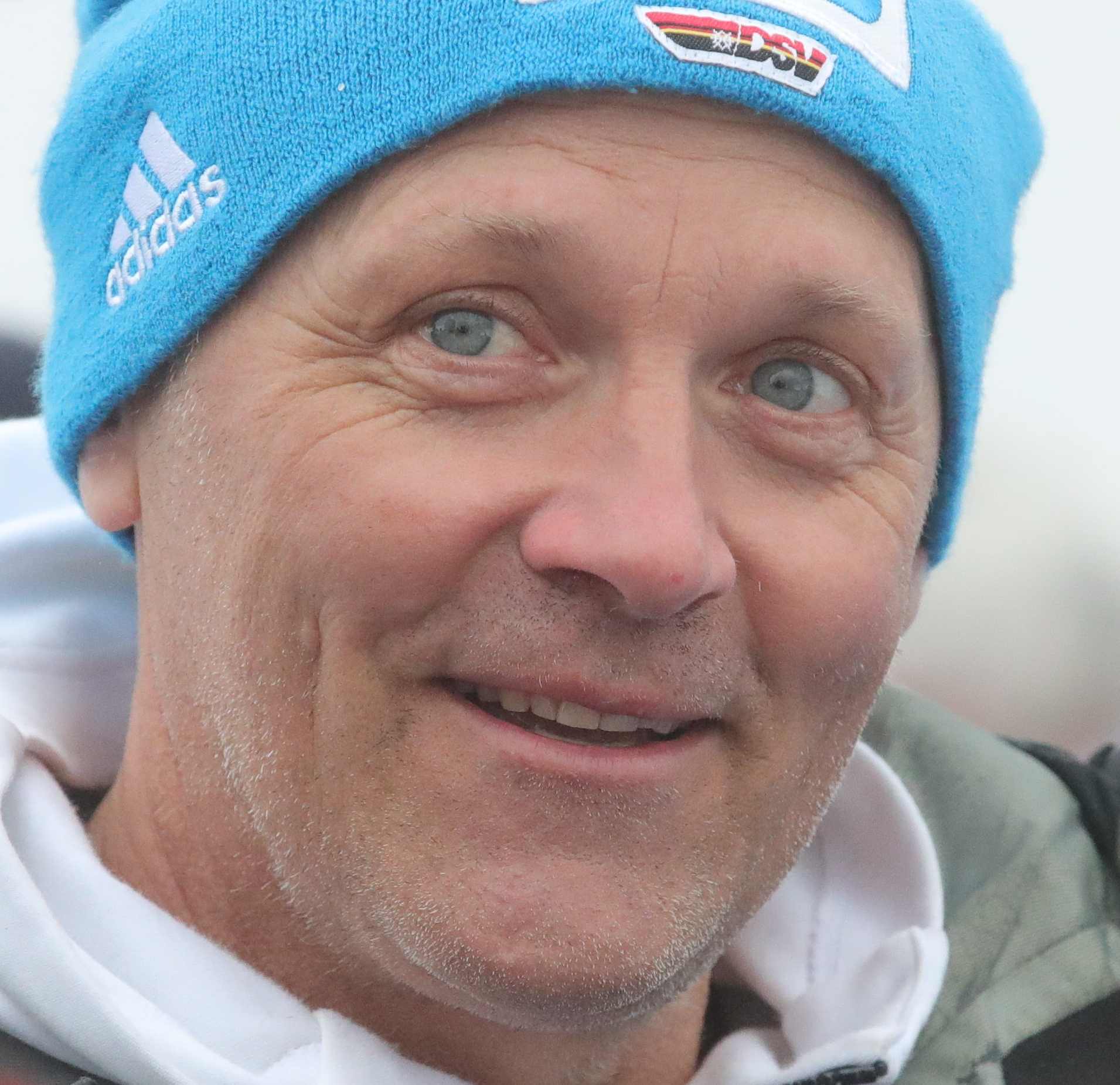
- Sendel in 2023

Personal information
- Full name: Peter Sendel
- Born: 6 March 1972 (age 54) Ilmenau, East Germany
- Height: 1.80 m (5 ft 11 in)

Sport

Professional information
- Sport: Biathlon
- Club: WSV Oberhof 05 e.V.
- World Cup debut: 9 December 1993
- Retired: 26 December 2004

Olympic Games
- Teams: 2 (1998, 2002)
- Medals: 2 (1 gold)

World Championships
- Teams: 9 (1994, 1995, 1996, 1997, 1999, 2000, 2001, 2003, 2004)
- Medals: 6 (2 gold)

World Cup
- Seasons: 12 (1993/94–2004/05)
- Individual victories: 0
- All victories: 15
- Individual podiums: 7
- All podiums: 40
Medal record
Men's biathlon
Representing Germany
Olympic Games
Gold medal – first place	1998 Nagano	4 × 7.5 km relay
Silver medal – second place	2002 Salt Lake City	4 × 7.5 km relay
World Championships
Gold medal – first place	1997 Brezno-Osrblie	4 × 7.5 km relay
Gold medal – first place	2003 Khanty-Mansiysk	4 × 7.5 km relay
Silver medal – second place	1996 Ruhpolding	4 × 7.5 km relay
Silver medal – second place	1997 Brezno-Osrblie	Team event
Bronze medal – third place	1994 Canmore	Team event
Bronze medal – third place	2000 Lahti	4 × 7.5 km relay

Peter Sendel (born 6 March 1972) is a German former biathlete. At the 1998 Olympics in Nagano, Sendel was a part of the German team that won the gold medal. Later he earned a relay silver medal from the 2002 Olympics in Salt Lake City. Sendel retired as a biathlete in 2004.

== Biathlon results ==
All results are sourced from the International Biathlon Union.

=== Olympic Games ===
2 medals (1 gold, 1 silver)

Event	Individual	Sprint	Pursuit	Relay
(Japan) 1998 Nagano	8th	—	—N/a	Gold
(United States) 2002 Salt Lake City	—	—	—	Silver

*Pursuit was added as an event in 2002.

=== World Championships ===
6 medals (2 gold, 2 silver, 2 bronze)

Event	Individual	Sprint	Pursuit	Mass start	Team	Relay
(Canada) 1994 Canmore	—N/a	—N/a	—N/a	—N/a	Bronze	—N/a
(Italy) 1995 Antholz-Anterselva	—	—	—N/a	—N/a	14th	—
(Germany) 1996 Ruhpolding	25th	—	—N/a	—N/a	—	Silver
(Slovakia) 1997 Brezno-Osrblie	—	—	—	—N/a	Silver	Gold
(Finland) 1999 Kontiolahti	18th	50th	15th	22nd	—N/a	4th
(Norway) 2000 Oslo Holmenkollen	6th	8th	12th	4th	—N/a	Bronze
(Slovenia) 2001 Pokljuka	47th	—	—	—	—N/a	—
(Russia) 2003 Khanty-Mansiysk	8th	—	—	11th	—N/a	Gold
(Germany) 2004 Oberhof	—	22nd	41st	27th	—N/a	—

*During Olympic seasons competitions are only held for those events not included in the Olympic program.
**Team was removed as an event in 1998, and pursuit was added in 1997 with mass start being added in 1999.
