= Christelle Gros =

French biathlete (born 1975)

Personal information
- Nationality: French
- Born: 19 May 1975 (age 49)

Sport
- Sport: Biathlon

Christelle Gros (born 19 May 1975) is a French biathlete. She competed in the two events at the 1998 Winter Olympics.
