= Svetlana Tchernousova =

Russian biathlete

Svetlana Albertovna Tchernousova (Russian: Светлана Альбертовна Черноусова); born 18 September 1970) is a Russian former biathlete.

== Honours ==
- Biathlon World Championships
  - Gold medal in relay in 2000, at the Biathlon World Championships 2000
  - Gold medal in relay in 2003, at the Biathlon World Championships 2003
- Biathlon World Cup
  - 1 victory in World Cup events
