= Anna Bogaliy-Titovets =

Russian biathlete

Anna Bogaliy
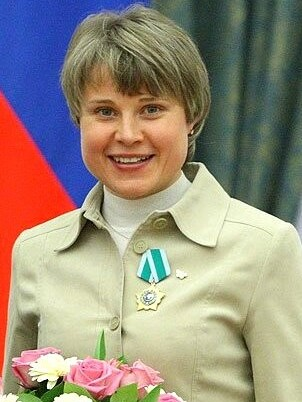

Personal information
- Full name: Anna Ivanovna Bogaliy
- Born: 12 June 1979 (age 47) Vozhega, Vologda Oblast, Soviet Union
- Height: 1.67 m (5 ft 6 in)

Sport
- Sport: Skiing

World Cup career
- Seasons: 2000-2012
- Indiv. podiums: 13
- Indiv. wins: 3
Medal record
Women's biathlon
Representing Russia
Olympic Games
Gold medal – first place	2006 Turin	4 × 6 km relay
Gold medal – first place	2010 Vancouver	4 × 6 km relay
World Championships
Gold medal – first place	2001 Pokljuka	4 × 7.5 km relay
Gold medal – first place	2005 Hochfilzen	4 × 6 km relay
Gold medal – first place	2006 Pokljuka	Mixed relay
Silver medal – second place	2004 Oberhof	7.5 km sprint
Silver medal – second place	2004 Oberhof	4 × 6 km relay
Silver medal – second place	2005 Khanty-Mansiysk	Mixed relay
Bronze medal – third place	2004 Oberhof	10 km pursuit
Junior World Championships
Gold medal – first place	1998 Jericho/Valcartier	Team
Silver medal – second place	1999 Pokljuka	3 × 7.5 km relay
- Updated on January 23, 2010

Anna Ivanovna Bogaliy (Russian: А́нна Ива́новна Бога́лий) (born 12 June 1979) is a retired Russian biathlete. She is 167 cm tall and weighs 58 kg.

== Biography ==
She was born in Vozhega, Vologda Oblast, on 12 June 1979. When she was 5, her family moved to Murmansk, where she started biathlon.

She has had eleven podium finishes, three in first place, four in second, and has come third four times. At the 2006 Winter Olympics, Bogaliy won gold on the 4 × 6 km relay. At the World Championships, she won three gold medals in relays, including a recent title in mixed relay in Holmenkollen.

In 2012 she made the decision to end her athletic career.

== Results ==
=== Olympic Games ===
Event	Individual	Sprint	Pursuit	Mass Start	Relay
(United States) 2002 Salt Lake City	—	18th	19th	—N/a	—
(Italy) 2006 Torino	35th	―	―	―	Gold
(Canada) 2010 Vancouver	25th	―	―	―	Gold

=== World Championships ===
Event	Individual	Sprint	Pursuit	Mass Start	Relay	Mixed Relay
(Slovenia) 2001 Pokljuka	5th	—	—	—	Gold	—N/a
(Russia) 2003 Khanty-Mansiysk	39th	—	—	—	—	—N/a
(Germany) 2004 Oberhof	10th	Silver	Bronze	14th	Silver	—N/a
(Austria) 2005 Hochfilzen	7th	7th	5th	19th	Gold	Silver
(Italy) 2007 Antholz-Anterselva	51st	―	―	―	7th	―
(Russia) 2011 Khanty-Mansiysk	20th	21st	11th	22nd	8th	―
(Germany) 2012 Ruhpolding	―	41st	23rd	―	7th	―
