= Katrin Apel =

German biathlete (born 1973)

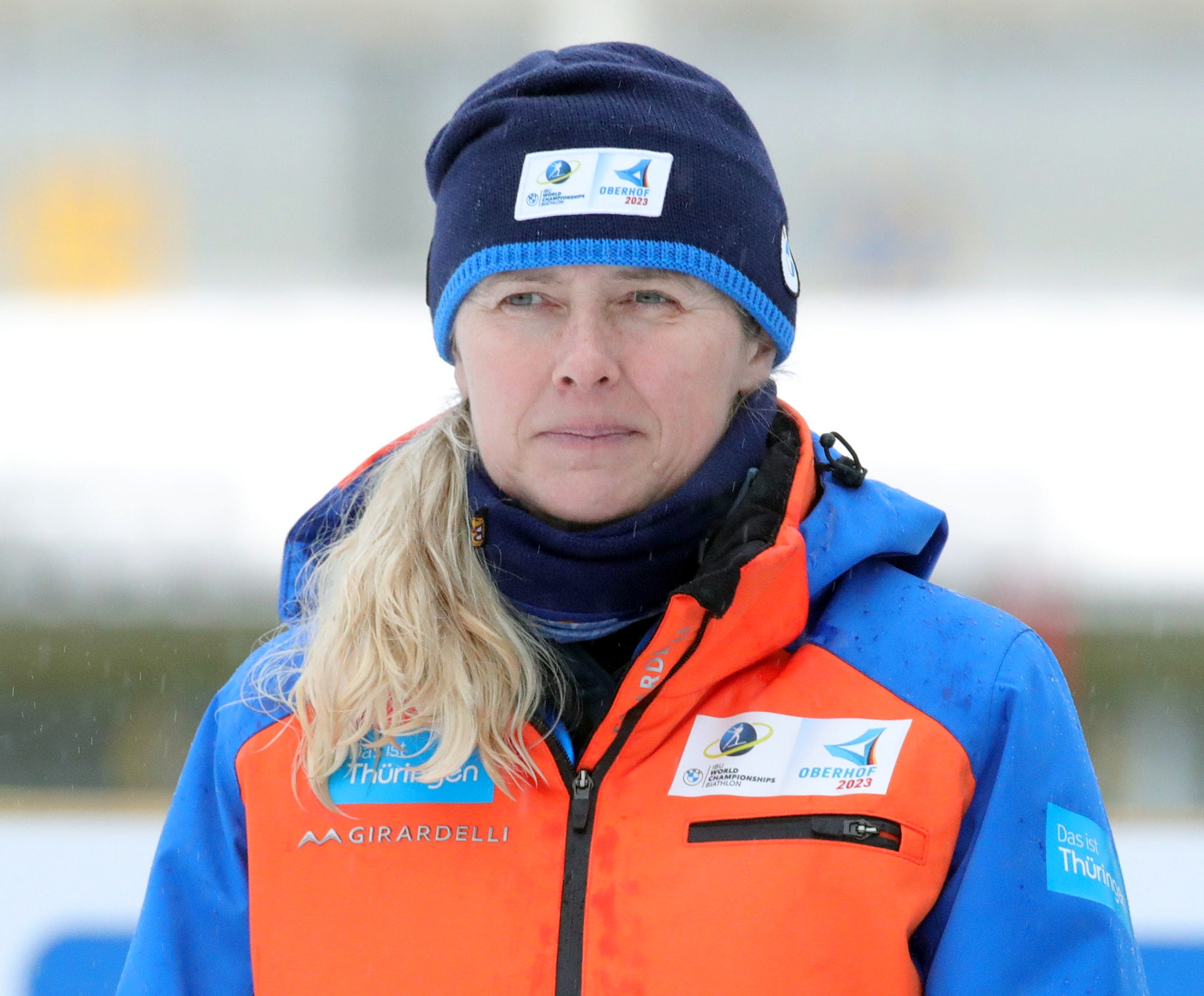
- Katrin Apel in 2023

Medal record

Women's biathlon

Representing Germany

Olympic Games
Gold medal – first place	1998 Nagano	4 × 7.5 km relay
Gold medal – first place	2002 Salt Lake City	4 × 7.5 km relay
Silver medal – second place	2006 Turin	4 × 6 km relay
Bronze medal – third place	1998 Nagano	7.5 km sprint

World Championships
Gold medal – first place	1996 Ruhpolding	Team event
Gold medal – first place	1996 Ruhpolding	4 × 7.5 km relay
Gold medal – first place	1997 Brezno-Osrblie	4 × 7.5 km relay
Gold medal – first place	1999 Kontiolahti	4 × 7.5 km relay
Silver medal – second place	2000 Oslo	7.5 km sprint
Silver medal – second place	2000 Oslo	4 × 7.5 km relay
Silver medal – second place	2001 Pokljuka	4 × 7.5 km relay
Silver medal – second place	2004 Oberhof	12.5 km mass start
Silver medal – second place	2005 Hochfilzen	4 × 6 km relay
Bronze medal – third place	2004 Oberhof	4 × 6 km relay

Women's cross-country skiing

Junior World Championships

Representing Germany
Bronze medal – third place	1993 Harrachov	5 km classical

Representing East Germany
Silver medal – second place	1990 Les Saisies	4 × 5 km relay

Katrin Apel (born 4 May 1973 in Erfurt) is a retired German biathlete. 1.72 m (5 ft 8 in), 61 kg (134 lb). Apel now resides in Gräfenroda, and is a member of the SV Eintracht Frankenhain club. Like most German winter sport athletes, Apel is a sport soldier, performing normal soldier duties but released for training and competitions.

Apel began her career as a cross-country skier; between 1990 and 1994, her best results were third place in the junior World Championships 5 km classical in 1993, and second in the relay also in the Junior World Championships, in 1990. However, when Apel failed to qualify for the Olympics in Lillehammer in 1994, she made the decision, along with her friend and then training partner Steffi Kramer, to switch to biathlon.

Apel began biathlon in 1994 in the European Cup, the second division of the World Cup. In Apel's first season in the World Cup, 1995/96, she placed 33rd, but her results improved from then on. In the 1998/99 season she placed 8th, in 1999/00 10th, 2000/01 12th. The 2001/02 season was her best when she finished the season in 5th place. In that season Apel placed 13th in the individual, 4th in the sprint, 4th in the pursuit, and 12th in the mass start. The year after she could only finish a lowly 20th place. She bounced back to 7th in the 2003/04 season and 8th again in 2004/05, where her best discipline was the pursuit, in which she finished 7th.

Apel has had 18 podium finishes in the World Cup. Four wins, five second places and nine third places. All but one of her World Cup wins were in the 2001/02 season when she came 5th in the final standings. Also three of the four wins were in the sprint. Apel is a solid shooter in the prone position, averaging mid 80% over the years, but her standing shot lets her down, only in the low 70%, though it has improved from mid-60% a few years ago.

Apel has four Olympic medals, two gold, one silver, and one bronze. Her only solo medal is a bronze in the sprint in the 1998 Winter Olympics. She won the other medals in relay events. Apel has ten World Championship medals, four gold, five silver, and one bronze. However, only two of the medals are solo medals, one a silver won in Oslo's Holmenkollen ski festival in 2000 in the sprint, and the other, also a silver, won in the mass start in Oberhof in 2004. The remaining medals were won in relays.
