= Olga Medvedtseva =

Russian biathlete (born 1975)

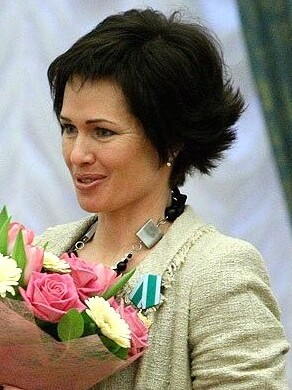

Personal information
- Full name: Olga Valeryevna Medvedtseva
- Born: July 7, 1975 (age 51) Borodino, Krasnoyarsk Krai, Russian SFSR Soviet Union
- Height: 1.63 m (5 ft 4 in)

Sport
- Sport: Skiing
- Club: CSKA Moscow

World Cup career
- Seasons: 2000-2010
- Indiv. podiums: 37
- Indiv. wins: 10
Medal record
Representing Russia
Women's biathlon
Olympic Games
| Gold medal – first place | 2002 Salt Lake City | 10 km pursuit |
| Gold medal – first place | 2010 Vancouver | 4 × 6 km relay |
| Bronze medal – third place | 2002 Salt Lake City | 4 × 7.5 km relay |
| Disqualified | 2006 Turin | 15 km individual |
World Championships
| Gold medal – first place | 2000 Oslo | 4 × 7.5 km relay |
| Gold medal – first place | 2001 Pokljuka | 4 × 7.5 km relay |
| Gold medal – first place | 2004 Oberhof | 15 km individual |
| Gold medal – first place | 2005 Hochfilzen | 4 × 6 km relay |
| Gold medal – first place | 2005 Khanty-Mansiysk | Mixed relay |
| Gold medal – first place | 2009 Pyeongchang | 4 × 6 km relay |
| Silver medal – second place | 2002 Oslo | 12.5 km mass start |
| Silver medal – second place | 2004 Oberhof | 4 × 6 km relay |
| Bronze medal – third place | 2005 Hochfilzen | 12.5 km mass start |
Women's cross-country skiing
Junior World Championships
| Gold medal – first place | 1993 Harrachov | 4 × 5 km relay |
| Gold medal – first place | 1995 Gällivare | 4 × 5 km relay |
| Silver medal – second place | 1994 Breitenwang | 15 km freestyle |
| Bronze medal – third place | 1994 Breitenwang | 5 km classical |
| Bronze medal – third place | 1995 Gällivare | 5 km classical |
- Updated on January 23, 2010

Olga Valeryevna Medvedtseva (Russian: Ольга Валерьевна Медведцева), former Pyleva (Russian: Пылёва), née Zamorozova (Russian: Заморозова), (born 7 July 1975) is a former Russian biathlete.

At the 2002 Winter Olympics, she won an individual gold medal in the 10 km pursuit, as well as the bronze medal in the team relay. She won her second gold at the 2010 Winter Olympics in a relay.

Pyleva also won twice at the Holmenkollen ski festival biathlon competition during the 2004–05 season in the sprint and pursuit events.

She retired after the 2009–10 season.

== Doping offense and disqualification in 2006 ==
At the 2006 Winter Olympics she won the silver in the women's 15 km individual race, but on February 16, 2006, she was disqualified from further competition for failing a drug test when she tested positive for the stimulant carphedon. The International Olympic Committee panel found her guilty, and she was expelled from the games and stripped of her medal. She was then banned for two years from competition, and the authorities in Turin started a criminal investigation into the matter. The head of the Russian Anti-Doping Committee claimed that Pyleva took an over-the-counter medication for an ankle injury prescribed by her personal doctor who is not a team doctor, which contained carphedon.

== Record ==
=== Olympic Games ===
| Event | Individual | Sprint | Pursuit | Mass Start | Relay |
|---|---|---|---|---|---|
| (United States) 2002 Salt Lake City | 4th | 8th | Gold | —N/a | Bronze |
| (Italy) 2006 Torino | DSQ (2nd) | ― | ― | ― | ― |
| (Canada) 2010 Vancouver | 21st | 22nd | 20th | 4th | Gold |

=== World Championships ===
| Event | Individual | Sprint | Pursuit | Mass Start | Relay | Mixed Relay |
|---|---|---|---|---|---|---|
| (Norway) 2000 Holmenkollen | 11th | — | — | 11th | Gold | —N/a |
| (Slovenia) 2001 Pokljuka | 13th | 7th | 4th | 7th | Gold | —N/a |
| (Norway) 2002 Holmenkollen | —N/a | | | Silver | —N/a | —N/a |
| (Russia) 2003 Khanty-Mansiysk | ― | 36th | 30th | 14th | — | —N/a |
| (Germany) 2004 Oberhof | Gold | 45th | 24th | 24th | Silver | —N/a |
| (Austria) 2005 Hochfilzen | 6th | 6th | 4th | Bronze | Gold | Gold^{[b]} |
| (South Korea) 2009 Pyeongchang | 19th | 21st | 14th | 9th | Gold | ― |

== See also ==
- Russia at the 2006 Winter Olympics
- List of sportspeople sanctioned for doping offences
