= 2009–10 Biathlon World Cup – Overall Men =

== 2008–09 Top 3 Standings ==
Medal	Athlete	Points
Gold:	(Norway) Ole Einar Bjørndalen	1080
Silver:	(Poland) Tomasz Sikora	870
Bronze:	(Norway) Emil Hegle Svendsen	844

== Events summary ==
Event:	Winner:	Second:	Third:
Östersund 20 km Individual detail	Emil Hegle Svendsen; Norway	Tim Burke; United States	Christoph Sumann; Austria
Östersund 10 km Sprint details	Ole Einar Bjørndalen; Norway	Emil Hegle Svendsen; Norway	Tim Burke; United States
Hochfilzen 10 km Sprint details	Ole Einar Bjørndalen; Norway	Nikolay Kruglov; Russia	Evgeny Ustyugov; Russia
Hochfilzen 12.5 km Pursuit details	Emil Hegle Svendsen; Norway	Simon Eder; Austria	Ole Einar Bjørndalen; Norway
Pokljuka 20 km Individual details	Christoph Sumann; Austria	Simon Fourcade; France	Alexander Os; Norway
Pokljuka 10 km Sprint details	Ivan Tcherezov; Russia	Dominik Landertinger; Austria	Thomas Frei; Switzerland
Pokljuka 12.5 km Pursuit details	Evgeny Ustyugov; Russia	Roland Lessing; Estonia	Simon Eder; Austria
Oberhof 10 km Sprint details	Evgeny Ustyugov; Russia	Michael Greis; Germany	Carl Johan Bergman; Sweden
Oberhof 15 km Mass start details	Ole Einar Bjørndalen; Norway	Tim Burke; United States	Tomasz Sikora; Poland
Ruhpolding 10 km Sprint details	Emil Hegle Svendsen; Norway	Ole Einar Bjørndalen; Norway	Michael Greis; Germany
Ruhpolding 15 km Mass start details	Emil Hegle Svendsen; Norway	Evgeny Ustyugov; Russia	Simon Eder; Austria
Antholz-Anterselva 20 km Individual details	Serguei Sednev; Ukraine	Daniel Mesotitsch; Austria	Alexis Bœuf; France
Antholz-Anterselva 10 km Sprint details	Arnd Peiffer; Germany	Dominik Landertinger; Austria	Christoph Stephan; Germany
Antholz-Anterselva 12.5 km Pursuit details	Daniel Mesotitsch; Austria	Arnd Peiffer; Germany	Dominik Landertinger; Austria
2010 Winter Olympics 10 km Sprint details	Vincent Jay; France	Emil Hegle Svendsen; Norway	Jakov Fak; Croatia
2010 Winter Olympics 12.5 km Pursuit details	Björn Ferry; Sweden	Christoph Sumann; Austria	Vincent Jay; France
2010 Winter Olympics 20 km Individual details	Emil Hegle Svendsen; Norway	Ole Einar Bjørndalen; Norway Sergey Novikov; Belarus	
2010 Winter Olympics 15 km Mass start details	Evgeny Ustyugov; Russia	Martin Fourcade; France	Pavol Hurajt; Slovakia
Kontiolahti 10 km Sprint details	Ivan Tcherezov; Russia	Emil Hegle Svendsen; Norway	Martin Fourcade; France
Kontiolahti 12.5 km Pursuit details	Martin Fourcade; France	Christian De Lorenzi; Italy	Vincent Jay; France
Oslo 10 km Sprint details	Martin Fourcade; France	Maxim Tchoudov; Russia	Christoph Sumann; Austria
Oslo 12.5 km Pursuit details	Martin Fourcade; France	Simon Schempp; Germany	Ivan Tcherezov; Russia
Oslo 15 km Mass start details	Ivan Tcherezov; Russia	Christoph Sumann; Austria	Emil Hegle Svendsen; Norway
Khanty-Mansiysk 10 km Sprint details	Ivan Tcherezov; Russia	Christian De Lorenzi; Italy	Andriy Deryzemlya; Ukraine
Khanty-Mansiysk 15 km Mass start details	Dominik Landertinger; Austria	Arnd Peiffer; Germany	Halvard Hanevold; Norway

== Standings ==
#	Name	ÖST IN	ÖST SP	HOC SP	HOC PU	POK IN	POK SP	POK PU	OBE SP	OBE MS	RUH SP	RUH MS	ANT IN	ANT SP	ANT PU	OLY SP	OLY PU	OLY IN	OLY MS	KON SP	KON PU	OSL SP	OSL PU	OSL MS	KHA SP	KHA MS	Total
1.	Emil Hegle Svendsen (NOR)	60	54	32	60	–	–	–	40	18	60	60	–	–	–	54	34	60	28	54	36	26	43	48	34	27	828
2	Christoph Sumann (AUT)	48	36	38	43	60	0	–	21	27	31	36	28	~~6~~	30	29	54	34	43	40	25	48	27	54	43	18	813
3	Ivan Tcherezov (RUS)	0	–	16	19	26	60	34	34	24	36	24	–	24	29	31	38	26	38	60	40	23	48	60	60	32	782
4	Evgeny Ustyugov (RUS)	27	~~2~~	48	40	10	36	60	60	43	32	54	DSQ	DSQ	DSQ	DSQ	DSQ	DSQ	DSQ	DSQ	DSQ	DSQ	DSQ	DSQ	DSQ	DSQ	412
5	Martin Fourcade (FRA)	36	34	29	27	–	–	–	0	20	38	40	34	38	43	6	7	27	54	48	60	60	60	20	0	38	719
6	Dominik Landertinger (AUT)	24	13	28	21	–	54	43	0	25	43	34	–	54	48	7	27	18	36	20	26	24	40	27	29	60	701
7	Simon Fourcade (FRA)	25	32	31	34	54	38	32	19	36	40	27	–	27	34	0	–	1	27	11	22	31	32	38	24	40	655
8	Simon Eder (AUT)	0	28	36	54	–	31	48	~~2~~	23	4	48	29	32	23	30	43	38	16	29	28	27	13	23	7	43	653
9	Arnd Peiffer (GER)	0	31	27	14	23	32	40	~~3~~	40	11	43	17	60	54	4	4	–	24	43	32	21	20	14	38	54	646
10	Ole Einar Bjørndalen (NOR)	0	60	60	48	–	–	–	27	60	54	38	–	–	–	24	36	54	14	–	–	0	24	28	40	26	593
11	Vincent Jay (FRA)	18	0	0	–	40	7	30	4	19	19	30	14	19	25	60	48	0	34	36	48	18	23	36	4	31	563
12	Daniel Mesotitsch (AUT)	11	8	0	25	34	5	12	1	15	21	28	54	40	60	0	0	32	40	0	9	36	29	30	20	30	540
13	Michael Greis (GER)	32	40	18	15	20	29	–	54	30	48	21	–	–	–	20	40	31	31	0	–	29	21	16	13	29	537
14	Tim Burke (USA)	54	48	21	31	27	34	38	22	54	10	22	12	20	–	0	0	0	23	19	0	0	17	18	30	25	525
15	Andreas Birnbacher (GER)	0	38	9	13	19	20	2	0	14	8	31	10	31	28	18	28	29	26	0	18	14	25	43	32	23	479
16	Björn Ferry (SWE)	38	0	20	36	29	21	27	–	–	12	23	–	–	–	34	60	0	29	–	–	38	34	25	31	15	472
17	Maxim Tchoudov (RUS)	43	0	43	28	–	0	–	0	29	34	25	36	15	0	0	–	–	–	28	19	54	26	34	0	24	438
18	Tomasz Sikora (POL)	0	27	0	–	38	0	25	11	48	–	–	27	30	38	12	23	36	30	22	30	0	–	24	–	–	421
19	Alexander Os (NOR)	29	23	10	0	48	23	24	31	38	16	32	–	–	–	–	–	13	–	30	27	0	2	29	19	20	414
20	Klemen Bauer (SLO)	0	26	0	–	0	28	36	29	26	29	12	0	0	3	43	32	9	13	0	24	28	0	26	10	22	396
21	Andriy Deryzemlya (UKR)	0	24	4	12	25	27	7	20	17	–	–	25	26	6	40	15	14	15	0	–	0	–	31	48	34	390
22	Serguei Sednev (UKR)	22	0	0	–	32	15	23	7	11	–	–	60	23	32	19	31	0	20	24	0	0	–	11	25	19	374
23	Anton Shipulin (RUS)	19	0	0	11	15	40	16	38	28	30	29	–	43	36	11	21	5	19	0	–	–	–	13	–	–	374
24	Pavol Hurajt (SVK)	7	0	5	0	31	0	–	0	–	9	–	40	11	14	36	25	40	48	0	34	15	7	12	0	28	362
25	Halvard Hanevold (NOR)	0	11	34	30	–	0	17	43	31	14	20	–	–	–	17	24	–	22	0	0	17	–	32	–	48	360
26	Sergey Novikov (BLR)	20	0	14	23	0	26	19	30	16	1	14	–	–	–	1	20	54	21	1	13	1	18	15	27	12	346
27	Christoph Stephan (GER)	0	43	0	–	0	0	–	0	–	17	–	38	48	40	22	11	12	18	0	–	16	0	19	21	17	322
28	Carl Johan Bergman (SWE)	0	25	24	20	0	9	4	48	13	6	26	–	–	–	0	22	0	–	4	43	10	9	22	18	11	314
29	Michal Šlesingr (CZE)	11	0	0	2	43	0	0	–	–	0	–	32	12	0	23	12	24	25	7	38	0	19	21	22	21	312
30	Jean-Philippe Leguellec (CAN)	31	29	0	–	0	6	28	–	22	0	19	2	0	8	38	30	28	11	10	16	0	–	17	0	14	309
#	Name	ÖST IN	ÖST SP	HOC SP	HOC PU	POK IN	POK SP	POK PU	OBE SP	OBE MS	RUH SP	RUH MS	ANT IN	ANT SP	ANT PU	OLY SP	OLY PU	OLY IN	OLY MS	KON SP	KON PU	OSL SP	OSL PU	OSL MS	KHA SP	KHA MS	Total
31	Nikolay Kruglov (RUS)	0	0	54	38	1	11	15	32	34	0	13	8	29	26	–	–	30	–	–	–	–	–	–	0	–	291
32	Christian De Lorenzi (ITA)	9	0	22	29	0	0	–	–	–	5	–	0	16	11	0	–	3	–	34	54	3	0	–	54	36	276
33	Friedrich Pinter (AUT)	43	–	6	18	18	19	18	0	12	18	18	–	9	13	–	–	–	–	23	17	0	0	–	17	16	265
34	Lars Berger (NOR)	34	17	40	32	–	0	26	28	32	–	–	–	0	–	0	18	–	–	0	0	0	–	–	0	–	227
35	Vincent Defrasne (FRA)	0	18	27	22	0	0	–	17	–	–	–	20	36	19	0	19	15	–	15	6	0	–	–	8	–	222
36	Simon Schempp (GER)	–	0	0	8	0	0	31	0	–	0	–	–	0	–	–	–	–	–	26	29	32	54	–	36	–	216
37	Jaroslav Soukup (CZE)	6	0	19	17	11	0	8	–	–	26	15	43	22	22	0	0	11	–	0	–	8	3	–	0	–	211
38	Jakov Fak (CRO)	0	0	0	–	0	0	–	–	–	0	–	0	17	24	48	16	0	32	5	7	30	30	–	–	–	209
39	Thomas Frei (SUI)	3	4	0	–	13	48	0	0	–	0	–	–	–	–	28	29	25	17	21	14	0	–	–	0	–	202
40	Victor Vasilyev (RUS)	0	16	23	10	28	18	0	0	21	–	17	0	0	–	–	–	–	–	0	15	2	15	–	28	–	193
41	Alexander Wolf (GER)	30	0	0	–	21	0	11	0	–	23	–	24	13	17	–	–	17	–	0	0	5	16	–	6	–	183
42	Tobias Eberhard (AUT)	15	0	25	0	0	0	–	6	–	27	–	23	8	31	–	–	–	–	0	–	22	11	–	9	–	177
43	Tarjei Bø (NOR)	–	–	–	–	4	43	29	16	–	15	11	–	–	–	–	–	20	–	0	–	19	4	–	15	–	176
44	Fredrik Lindström (SWE)	2	22	0	0	17	17	21	0	–	20	16	–	–	–	3	8	0	–	–	–	7	31	–	12	–	176
45	Frode Andresen (NOR)	–	–	–	–	36	24	22	–	–	–	–	–	34	18	–	–	–	–	25	4	0	–	–	–	–	163
46	Janez Maric (SLO)	26	0	0	0	0	0	6	0	–	3	–	21	0	0	14	0	0	–	8	11	40	28	–	0	–	157
47	Serhiy Semenov (UKR)	–	–	–	–	0	22	20	25	–	–	–	0	28	0	8	2	0	–	17	12	4	6	–	0	–	144
48	Jeremy Teela (USA)	0	0	0	–	0	15	10	23	–	24	–	–	–	–	32	17	–	12	–	–	–	–	–	–	–	133
49	Simon Hallenbarter (SUI)	0	3	13	0	0	0	–	12	–	3	–	0	5	21	25	0	0	–	–	–	12	22	–	1	–	117
50	Lukas Hofer (ITA)	0	21	17	26	0	0	–	–	–	0	–	26	0	9	0	0	0	–	0	–	0	–	–	14	–	113
51	Aleksey Volkov (RUS)	–	0	–	–	–	–	–	–	–	–	–	–	–	–	–	–	–	–	32	1	43	36	–	0	–	112
52	Mattias Nilsson (SWE)	0	15	11	24	30	0	–	0	–	0	–	–	–	–	–	–	7	–	16	5	0	–	–	–	–	108
53	Alexis Bœuf (FRA)	0	0	0	–	–	–	–	–	–	–	–	48	0	–	–	–	–	–	38	21	–	–	–	0	–	107
54	Matthias Simmen (SUI)	0	20	0	4	6	0	0	0	–	0	–	19	0	0	15	13	2	–	0	0	25	0	–	2	–	106
55	Ilmārs Bricis (LAT)	16	7	0	–	8	–	–	0	–	28	–	–	–	–	27	9	0	–	9	0	0	–	–	0	–	104
56	Rustam Valiullin (BLR)	0	0	30	6	0	0	–	26	–	0	–	–	–	–	0	0	0	–	0	8	11	8	–	5	–	94
57	Paavo Puurunen (FIN)	14	9	15	16	0	8	14	–	–	–	–	0	0	7	0	–	0	–	0	–	0	0	–	–	–	83
58	Benjamin Weger (SUI)	–	–	–	–	–	–	–	–	–	22	–	–	0	–	0	–	0	–	12	23	0	1	–	24	–	82
59	Roland Lessing (EST)	0	0	0	–	0	25	54	–	–	0	–	0	–	–	0	–	0	–	–	–	0	0	–	–	–	79
60	Brendan Green (CAN)	0	0	0	0	0	0	0	–	–	0	–	22	7	27	–	–	–	–	0	–	9	12	–	0	–	77
#	Name	ÖST IN	ÖST SP	HOC SP	HOC PU	POK IN	POK SP	POK PU	OBE SP	OBE MS	RUH SP	RUH MS	ANT IN	ANT SP	ANT PU	OLY SP	OLY PU	OLY IN	OLY MS	KON SP	KON PU	OSL SP	OSL PU	OSL MS	KHA SP	KHA MS	Total
61	Alexsandr Chervyhkov (KAZ)	8	–	12	9	7	1	13	9	–	0	–	7	0	0	0	0	0	–	0	10	0	–	–	0	–	76
62	Magnús Jónsson (SWE)	0	12	0	0	4	0	0	–	–	0	–	–	–	–	0	–	–	–	27	31	0	–	–	0	–	74
63	Dušan Šimočko (SVK)	0	0	0	–	–	–	–	–	–	13	–	0	18	16	0	–	23	–	0	–	0	–	–	0	–	70
64	Tomáš Holubec (CZE)	28	6	0	0	0	0	–	–	–	0	–	0	0	–	–	–	–	–	–	–	20	14	–	0	–	68
65	Ronny Hafsås (NOR)	0	30	0	0	0	0	3	–	–	–	–	–	–	–	–	–	–	–	31	0	–	–	–	–	–	64
66	Ondřej Moravec (CZE)	12	0	0	0	0	10	0	–	–	7	–	0	25	10	0	–	–	–	–	–	–	–	–	–	–	64
67	Krasimir Anev (BUL)	4	0	0	–	0	16	9	0	–	0	–	–	–	–	16	0	16	–	0	–	0	–	–	0	–	61
68	Olexander Bilanenko (UKR)	23	0	0	7	0	–	–	–	–	–	–	0	0	1	–	–	19	–	2	2	0	–	–	–	–	54
69	Zhang Chengye (CHN)	17	–	0	–	0	0	0	0	–	0	–	–	–	–	9	6	22	–	–	–	–	–	–	–	–	54
70	Evgeny Abramenko (BLR)	0	0	–	–	22	13	1	14	–	0	–	–	–	–	0	1	0	–	0	–	–	–	–	–	–	51
71	Hans Martin Gjedrem (NOR)	–	–	–	–	12	0	0	–	–	–	–	15	4	20	–	–	–	–	–	–	–	–	–	–	–	51
72	Hidenori Isa (JPN)	0	5	0	–	14	31	0	0	–	0	–	0	0	–	0	–	0	–	–	–	–	–	–	–	–	50
73	Markus Windisch (ITA)	0	19	0	–	2	0	–	–	–	–	–	0	0	0	0	0	10	–	18	0	0	–	–	–	–	49
74	Alexandr Syman (BLR)	0	0	0	1	0	0	–	13	–	0	–	–	–	–	21	10	0	–	0	–	0	–	–	0	–	45
75	Claudio Böckli (SUI)	0	0	0	0	0	12	0	0	–	25	–	0	3	4	–	–	–	–	0	0	0	0	–	0	–	44
76	Michael Rösch (GER)	0	10	8	3	0	0	–	–	–	–	–	3	14	0	–	–	–	–	–	–	–	–	–	–	–	38
77	Roman Dostál (CZE)	–	0	0	–	0	0	–	–	–	0	–	31	0	–	–	–	6	–	0	–	0	0	–	0	–	37
78	Martten Kaldvee (EST)	0	–	–	–	0	0	–	36	–	0	–	–	0	–	0	–	0	–	–	–	–	–	–	–	–	36
79	Indrek Tobreluts (EST)	0	14	1	0	–	0	–	–	–	0	–	–	11	0	10	0	–	–	–	–	0	–	–	–	–	36
80	Peter Dokl (SLO)	0	0	0	0	0	0	–	0	–	0	–	30	0	–	0	0	0	–	–	–	–	–	–	–	–	30
81	Daniel Böhm (GER)	–	–	–	–	–	–	–	0	–	0	–	–	–	–	–	–	–	–	–	–	13	0	–	16	–	29
82	Ted Armgren (SWE)	–	–	–	–	–	–	–	15	–	0	–	0	1	12	–	–	–	–	0	–	0	–	–	–	–	28
83	Ivan Joller (SUI)	0	0	0	–	24	0	–	0	–	–	–	1	–	–	–	–	–	–	–	–	–	–	–	–	–	25
84	Jean-Guillaume Béatrix (FRA)	0	0	0	–	–	–	–	24	–	0	–	0	–	–	–	–	–	–	–	–	–	–	–	–	–	24
85	Priit Viks (EST)	0	0	0	–	0	–	–	–	–	–	–	0	–	–	–	–	21	–	0	–	0	0	–	3	–	24
86	Timo Antila (FIN)	1	0	0	–	–	–	–	18	–	0	–	4	0	0	1	0	0	–	0	–	0	–	–	–	–	24
87	Vasja Rupnik (SLO)	0	0	0	0	0	4	5	0	–	0	–	0	0	–	0	0	0	–	13	0	0	–	–	–	–	22
88	Rene Laurent Vuillermoz (ITA)	21	0	0	–	–	–	–	–	–	0	–	0	0	0	–	–	0	–	–	–	–	–	–	–	–	21
89	Marc-André Bédard (CAN)	–	–	–	–	0	0	–	–	–	0	–	0	21	0	–	–	–	–	–	–	–	–	–	–	–	21
90	Lowell Bailey (USA)	–	0	0	–	5	3	0	–	–	0	–	0	0	–	5	5	0	–	3	0	0	–	–	–	–	21
#	Name	ÖST IN	ÖST SP	HOC SP	HOC PU	POK IN	POK SP	POK PU	OBE SP	OBE MS	RUH SP	RUH MS	ANT IN	ANT SP	ANT PU	OLY SP	OLY PU	OLY IN	OLY MS	KON SP	KON PU	OSL SP	OSL PU	OSL MS	KHA SP	KHA MS	Total
91	Mattia Cola (ITA)	0	0	–	–	0	2	0	–	–	0	–	0	2	15	0	0	–	–	–	–	–	–	–	–	–	19
92	Zdeněk Vítek (CZE)	–	–	–	–	0	0	–	–	–	0	–	0	0	0	13	3	–	0	3	0	–	–	-	–	–	19
93	Robin Clegg (CAN)	0	0	0	–	–	–	–	–	–	0	–	18	0	–	–	–	–	–	–	–	–	–	–	–	–	18
94	Yan Savitskiy (KAZ)	–	0	2	0	–	–	–	–	–	0	–	–	0	–	2	14	0	–	0	0	–	–	–	0	–	18
95	Oleg Berezhnoy (UKR)	0	–	0	–	16	0	0	–	–	0	–	–	–	–	–	–	–	–	–	–	–	–	–	–	–	16
96	Vladimir Chepelin (BLR)	–	–	–	–	–	–	–	–	–	–	–	16	0	–	–	–	–	–	–	–	0	–	–	0	–	16
97	Jay Hakkinen (USA)	13	0	3	0	–	–	–	0	–	0	–	0	0	–	0	0	0	–	–	–	–	–	–	–	–	16
98	Kazuya Inomata (JPN)	–	–	–	–	–	–	–	–	–	0	–	–	–	–	–	–	–	–	0	–	6	10	–	–	–	16
99	Lukasz Szczurek (POL)	0	0	0	–	0	0	–	0	–	0	–	13	0	–	0	–	0	–	–	–	–	–	–	–	–	13
100	Michail Kletcherov (BUL)	0	0	7	5	0	0	–	0	–	0	–	–	–	–	0	0	0	–	0	–	0	–	–	0	–	12
101	Kauri Koiv (EST)	0	0	0	–	0	0	–	0	–	–	–	11	0	–	0	0	0	–	–	–	0	–	–	–	–	11
102	Daniel Graf (GER)	–	–	–	–	–	–	–	–	–	–	–	–	–	–	–	–	–	–	–	–	–	–	–	11	–	11
103	Mikhail Siamionau (BLR)	–	0	0	–	–	0	–	10	–	0	–	–	–	–	–	–	–	–	0	–	0	0	–	0	–	10
104	Vyacheslav Derkach (UKR)	0	0	0	–	0	0	0	0	–	–	–	9	0	–	0	–	–	–	–	–	–	–	–	–	–	9
105	Scott Perras (CAN)	–	–	–	–	9	0	–	–	–	–	–	–	–	–	–	–	–	–	0	–	0	–	–	0	–	9
106	Marek Matiasko (SVK)	0	–	0	–	0	0	–	–	–	0	–	0	–	–	0	–	8	–	0	–	–	–	–	–	–	8
107	Priit Narusk (EST)	–	–	–	–	–	–	–	8	–	0	–	–	–	–	–	–	–	–	0	–	–	–	–	–	–	8
108	Roman Pryma (UKR)	0	0	0	–	–	–	–	0	–	0	–	0	0	0	–	–	–	–	6	0	0	0	–	0	–	6
109	Lois Habert (FRA)	–	–	–	–	–	–	–	0	–	0	–	6	0	0	–	–	–	–	–	–	–	–	–	–	–	6
110	Vitali Tsvetau (BLR)	–	–	–	–	–	–	–	–	–	–	–	0	0	5	–	–	–	–	–	–	–	–	–	–	–	5
111	Junji Nagai (JPN)	0	0	0	–	0	0	–	5	–	0	–	0	0	0	–	–	–	–	0	–	0	0	–	–	–	5
112	Tanguy Roche (FRA)	–	–	–	–	–	–	–	–	–	–	–	–	–	–	–	–	–	–	–	–	0	5	–	–	–	5
113	Jörgen Brink (SWE)	5	0	0	–	–	0	–	–	–	–	–	–	–	–	–	–	–	–	–	–	–	–	–	–	–	5
114	Julian Eberhard (AUT)	–	–	–	–	–	–	–	–	–	–	–	5	–	–	–	–	–	–	–	–	–	–	–	–	–	5
115	Edgars Piksons (LAT)	–	–	0	–	–	–	–	0	–	–	–	–	–	–	0	–	4	–	0	–	0	–	–	–	–	4
116	Rune Brattsveen (NOR)	0	1	0	–	0	–	–	–	–	–	–	–	–	–	–	–	–	–	–	–	–	–	–	–	–	1
#	Name	ÖST IN	ÖST SP	HOC SP	HOC PU	POK IN	POK SP	POK PU	OBE SP	OBE MS	RUH SP	RUH MS	ANT IN	ANT SP	ANT PU	OLY SP	OLY PU	OLY IN	OLY MS	KON SP	KON PU	OSL SP	OSL PU	OSL MS	KHA SP	KHA MS	Total
