= 2006–07 Biathlon World Cup =

Discipline	Men	Women
Overall	(Germany) Michael Greis	(Germany) Andrea Henkel
Nations Cup	Russia	Germany
Individual	(France) Raphaël Poirée	(Germany) Andrea Henkel
Sprint	(Germany) Michael Greis	(Sweden) Anna Carin Olofsson
Pursuit	(Russia) Dmitry Yaroshenko	(Germany) Kati Wilhelm
Mass start	(Norway) Ole Einar Bjørndalen	(Germany) Kati Wilhelm
Relay	Russia	France

Competition

The 2006–07 Biathlon World Cup was a multi-race tournament over a season of biathlon, organised by the International Biathlon Union. The season lasted from 29 November 2006 to 18 March 2007.

This article contains the top ten result listings and concise summary comments for each of the season's twenty-seven individual races and five relays for both genders, arranged by World Cup meet 1 through 9 (denoted WC 1–9), accompanied by the top ten Total Cup rankings after each of the meets plus the 2007 World Championships (held between WC 6 and 7, and in the usual way counted as a World Cup meet towards the accumulated scores).

- For a list of the Total and Relay World Cup winners and runners-up of all World Cup seasons since 1977-78, see the Biathlon World Cup article.

== Calendar ==
Below is the World Cup calendar for the 2006–07 season.

Location	Date	Individual	Sprint	Pursuit	Mass start	Relay	Details
(Sweden) Östersund	29. November–3. December	●	●	●			
(Austria) Hochfilzen	8.–10. December		●	●		●	
(Austria) Hochfilzen ^{1}	13.–16. December	● (Women)	● (Men x2, Women x1)			●	
(Germany) Oberhof	3.–7. January		●	●		●	
(Germany) Ruhpolding	10.–14. January		●		●	●	
(Slovenia) Pokljuka	17.–21. January		●	●	●		
(Italy) Antholz	3.–11. February	●	●	●	●	●	World Championships
(Finland) Lahti	28. February–4. March	●	●	●			
(Norway) Holmenkollen	8.–11. March	● (Men)	● (Women)	●	●		
(Russia) Khanty-Mansijsk	15.–18. March		●	●	●		
Total		4	10	8	5	5	

- ^{1} Rescheduled from (Slovakia) Osrblie

== Scores and leader bibs ==
- For the seventh successive season, the race victory gives 50 points, a 2nd place gives 46 pts, a 3rd place 43 pts, a 4th place 40 pts, a fifth place 37 pts, a 6th place 34 pts, then further decreasing by two pts down to the 15th place (16 pts), then linearly decreasing by one point down to the 30th place (see the Place/Points table on the page's upper right). Equal placings, i.e. same-time finishes (ties) give an equal number of points.
- The sum of all WC points of the season, minus the score from a predetermined number of events (say, 3) give the biathlete's accumulated WC score (naturally, the races chosen to be eliminated from the total will be those with the lowest scores). Biathletes with an equal number of accumulated points are ranked by number of victories, 2nd places, 3rd places, and so on, in practice reducing the possibility of ties to just about nil.
- In addition to the Total WC score as described above, the points from races in each separate single-biathlete format—Individual, Sprint, Pursuit, and Mass start—accumulate toward separate scores with associated "sub-Cups" to be won. See the main Biathlon article for a detailed description of the race formats.
- In any given race, the biathlete with the highest accumulated Total WC score before the race wears a yellow number bib. The leader of the specific race format wears a red bib. If the same biathlete leads both the Total and the specific format's World Cup, a combined yellow-and-red bib is worn. In the first races of the season, the winners of the previous season's Cups wear the associated bibs.
- There are also two multi-biathlete Cups to be won, namely the Relay and Nation Cups. The scores of the Relay races are awarded to each nation's team in the same manner as in the single-biathlete Cups. No leader bibs are worn during the Relays. For the Nation Cup, the combined scores of the three best biathletes from each nation in the Individual and Sprint races, as well as the Relay scores, are accumulated. The Nation Cup points scale is different from the World Cup points scale; each place from 1st through 30th scores 100 more points than in the World Cup, and from 31st down to 130th points are awarded on a scale from 100 to 1.

== Medal table ==
Rank	Nation	Gold	Silver	Bronze	Total
1	Germany	21	26	25	72
2	Norway	16	7	8	31
3	Russia	10	13	7	30
4	France	9	9	7	25
5	Sweden	4	6	4	14
6	Austria	2	0	1	3
7	Ukraine	1	1	2	4
8	Poland	1	1	1	3
9	Czech Republic	0	1	1	2
10	China	0	0	3	3
11	Belarus	0	0	1	1
11	Canada	0	0	1	1
11	Italy	0	0	1	1
11	Slovenia	0	0	1	1
11	Switzerland	0	0	1	1
Totals (15 entries)		64	64	64	192

== World Cup podiums ==
=== Men ===
Stage	Date	Place	Discipline	Winner	Second	Third	Yellow bib (After competition)	Det.
1	30 November 2006	(Sweden) Östersund	20 km Individual	(Norway) Ole Einar Bjørndalen	(Germany) Andreas Birnbacher	(Germany) Michael Greis	(Norway) Ole Einar Bjørndalen	Detail
1	2 December 2006	(Sweden) Östersund	10 km Sprint	(Norway) Ole Einar Bjørndalen	(Russia) Dmitry Yaroshenko	(Germany) Michael Greis	(Norway) Ole Einar Bjørndalen	Detail
1	3 December 2006	(Sweden) Östersund	12.5 km Pursuit	(Norway) Ole Einar Bjørndalen	(Russia) Dmitry Yaroshenko	(France) Raphaël Poirée	(Norway) Ole Einar Bjørndalen	Detail
2	8 December 2006	(Austria) Hochfilzen	10 km Sprint	(Norway) Ole Einar Bjørndalen	(Germany) Michael Greis	(Switzerland) Matthias Simmen	(Norway) Ole Einar Bjørndalen	Detail
2	9 December 2006	(Austria) Hochfilzen	12.5 km Pursuit	(Norway) Ole Einar Bjørndalen	(Russia) Dmitry Yaroshenko	(Russia) Ivan Tcherezov	(Norway) Ole Einar Bjørndalen	Detail
3	14 December 2006	(Austria) Hochfilzen	10 km Sprint	(Germany) Michael Greis	(Russia) Maxim Tchoudov	(Sweden) Björn Ferry	(Norway) Ole Einar Bjørndalen	Detail
3	16 December 2006	(Austria) Hochfilzen	10 km Sprint	(France) Raphaël Poirée	(Germany) Michael Rösch	(Germany) Sven Fischer	(Germany) Michael Greis	Detail
4	6 January 2007	(Germany) Oberhof	10 km Sprint	(Russia) Nikolay Kruglov	(Germany) Michael Greis	(Italy) René-Laurent Vuillermoz	(Germany) Michael Greis	Detail
4	7 January 2007	(Germany) Oberhof	12.5 km Pursuit	(Russia) Nikolay Kruglov	(Russia) Dmitry Yaroshenko	(Russia) Maxim Tchoudov	(Germany) Michael Greis	Detail
5	13 January 2007	(Germany) Ruhpolding	10 km Sprint	(Norway) Ole Einar Bjørndalen	(Norway) Halvard Hanevold	(Norway) Emil Hegle Svendsen	(Norway) Ole Einar Bjørndalen	Detail
5	14 January 2007	(Germany) Ruhpolding	15 km Mass Start	(Norway) Ole Einar Bjørndalen	(Norway) Emil Hegle Svendsen	(Austria) Christoph Sumann	(Norway) Ole Einar Bjørndalen	Detail
6	18 January 2007	(Slovenia) Pokljuka	10 km Sprint	(Germany) Alexander Wolf	(Sweden) Björn Ferry	(Norway) Emil Hegle Svendsen	(Norway) Ole Einar Bjørndalen	Detail
6	20 January 2007	(Slovenia) Pokljuka	12.5 km Pursuit	(Austria) Christoph Sumann	(Germany) Alexander Wolf	(France) Vincent Defrasne	(Norway) Ole Einar Bjørndalen	Detail
6	21 January 2007	(Slovenia) Pokljuka	15 km Mass Start	(Austria) Christoph Sumann	(France) Vincent Defrasne	(Germany) Andreas Birnbacher	(Norway) Ole Einar Bjørndalen	Detail
WC	3 February 2007	(Italy) Antholz-Anterselva	10 km Sprint	(Norway) Ole Einar Bjørndalen	(Czech Republic) Michal Šlesingr	(Ukraine) Andriy Deryzemlya	(Norway) Ole Einar Bjørndalen	Detail
WC	4 February 2007	(Italy) Antholz-Anterselva	12.5 km Pursuit	(Norway) Ole Einar Bjørndalen	(Russia) Maxim Tchoudov	(France) Vincent Defrasne	(Norway) Ole Einar Bjørndalen	Detail
WC	6 February 2007	(Italy) Antholz-Anterselva	20 km Individual	(France) Raphaël Poirée	(Germany) Michael Greis	(Czech Republic) Michal Šlesingr	(Norway) Ole Einar Bjørndalen	Detail
WC	11 February 2007	(Italy) Antholz-Anterselva	15 km Mass Start	(Germany) Michael Greis	(Germany) Andreas Birnbacher	(France) Raphaël Poirée	(Norway) Ole Einar Bjørndalen	Detail
7	1 March 2007	(Finland) Lahti	20 km Individual	(France) Raphaël Poirée	(France) Simon Fourcade	(Germany) Alexander Wolf	(Germany) Michael Greis	Detail
7	3 March 2007	(Finland) Lahti	10 km Sprint	(France) Raphaël Poirée	(Norway) Alexander Os	(Norway) Hans Martin Gjedrem	(Germany) Michael Greis	Detail
7	4 March 2007	(Finland) Lahti	12.5 km Pursuit	(France) Raphaël Poirée	(Germany) Michael Greis	(Germany) Sven Fischer	(Germany) Michael Greis	Detail
8	8 March 2007	(Norway) Oslo Holmenkollen	20 km Individual	(France) Raphaël Poirée	(Germany) Michael Greis	(Russia) Dmitry Yaroshenko	(Germany) Michael Greis	Detail
8	10 March 2007	(Norway) Oslo Holmenkollen	12.5 km Pursuit	(Norway) Ole Einar Bjørndalen	(France) Raphaël Poirée	(Germany) Michael Greis	(Germany) Michael Greis	Detail
8	11 March 2007	(Norway) Oslo Holmenkollen	15 km Mass Start	(Norway) Ole Einar Bjørndalen	(France) Raphaël Poirée	(Germany) Sven Fischer	(Germany) Michael Greis	Detail
9	15 March 2007	(Russia) Khanty-Mansiysk	10 km Sprint	(Germany) Michael Rösch	(Russia) Maxim Tchoudov	(Russia) Andrei Makoveev	(Germany) Michael Greis	Detail
9	17 March 2007	(Russia) Khanty-Mansiysk	12.5 km Pursuit	(Russia) Maxim Tchoudov	(Sweden) Björn Ferry	(Norway) Stian Eckhoff	(Germany) Michael Greis	Detail
9	18 March 2007	(Russia) Khanty-Mansiysk	15 km Mass Start	(Russia) Ivan Tcherezov	(Germany) Michael Greis	(Germany) Sven Fischer	(Germany) Michael Greis	Detail

=== Women ===
Stage	Date	Place	Discipline	Winner	Second	Third	Yellow bib (After competition)	Det.
1	29 November 2006	(Sweden) Östersund	15 km Individual	(Russia) Irina Malgina	(Norway) Liv-Kjersti Eikeland	(Canada) Zina Kocher	(Russia) Irina Malgina	Detail
1	1 December 2006	(Sweden) Östersund	7.5 km Sprint	(Poland) Magdalena Gwizdoń	(Germany) Kati Wilhelm	(Germany) Martina Glagow	(Germany) Andrea Henkel	Detail
1	3 December 2006	(Sweden) Östersund	10 km Pursuit	(Norway) Linda Grubben	(Sweden) Anna Carin Olofsson	(Poland) Magdalena Gwizdoń	(Germany) Andrea Henkel	Detail
2	8 December 2006	(Austria) Hochfilzen	7.5 km Sprint	(Germany) Andrea Henkel	(Poland) Magdalena Gwizdoń	(China) Kong Yingchao	(Germany) Andrea Henkel	Detail
2	9 December 2006	(Austria) Hochfilzen	10 km Pursuit	(Germany) Andrea Henkel	(Norway) Linda Grubben	(Sweden) Anna Carin Olofsson	(Germany) Andrea Henkel	Detail
3	13 December 2006	(Austria) Hochfilzen	15 km Individual	(Germany) Andrea Henkel	(Germany) Martina Glagow	(Ukraine) Oksana Khvostenko	(Germany) Andrea Henkel	Detail
3	15 December 2006	(Austria) Hochfilzen	7.5 km Sprint	(Sweden) Anna Carin Olofsson	(France) Sandrine Bailly	(Germany) Andrea Henkel	(Germany) Andrea Henkel	Detail
4	5 January 2007	(Germany) Oberhof	7.5 km Sprint	(Germany) Magdalena Neuner	(Germany) Andrea Henkel	(Germany) Martina Glagow	(Germany) Andrea Henkel	Detail
4	7 January 2007	(Germany) Oberhof	10 km Pursuit	(Norway) Linda Grubben	(France) Sandrine Bailly	(Germany) Magdalena Neuner	(Germany) Andrea Henkel	Detail
5	12 January 2007	(Germany) Ruhpolding	7.5 km Sprint	(France) Sandrine Bailly	(Sweden) Anna Carin Olofsson	(France) Florence Baverel-Robert	(Germany) Andrea Henkel	Detail
5	14 January 2007	(Germany) Ruhpolding	12.5 km Mass Start	(Sweden) Anna Carin Olofsson	(Germany) Kati Wilhelm	(Norway) Linda Grubben	(Sweden) Anna Carin Olofsson	Detail
6	17 January 2007	(Slovenia) Pokljuka	7.5 km Sprint	(Sweden) Anna Carin Olofsson	(Russia) Tatiana Moiseeva	(Germany) Kati Wilhelm	(Sweden) Anna Carin Olofsson	Detail
6	19 January 2007	(Slovenia) Pokljuka	10 km Pursuit	(Germany) Kati Wilhelm	(Russia) Tatiana Moiseeva	(Belarus) Natalya Sokolova	(Sweden) Anna Carin Olofsson	Detail
6	21 January 2007	(Slovenia) Pokljuka	12.5 km Mass Start	(Ukraine) Oksana Khvostenko	(Germany) Kati Wilhelm	(Slovenia) Tadeja Brankovič	(Sweden) Anna Carin Olofsson	Detail
WC	3 February 2007	(Italy) Antholz-Anterselva	7.5 km Sprint	(Germany) Magdalena Neuner	(Sweden) Anna Carin Olofsson	(Russia) Natalia Guseva	(Sweden) Anna Carin Olofsson	Detail
WC	4 February 2007	(Italy) Antholz-Anterselva	10 km Pursuit	(Germany) Magdalena Neuner	(Norway) Linda Grubben	(Sweden) Anna Carin Olofsson	(Sweden) Anna Carin Olofsson	Detail
WC	7 February 2007	(Italy) Antholz-Anterselva	15 km Individual	(Norway) Linda Grubben	(France) Florence Baverel-Robert	(Germany) Martina Glagow	(Sweden) Anna Carin Olofsson	Detail
WC	10 February 2007	(Italy) Antholz-Anterselva	12.5 km Mass Start	(Germany) Andrea Henkel	(Germany) Martina Glagow	(Germany) Kati Wilhelm	(Sweden) Anna Carin Olofsson	Detail
7	28 February 2007	(Finland) Lahti	15 km Individual	(Germany) Andrea Henkel	(France) Florence Baverel-Robert	(Germany) Kati Wilhelm	(Sweden) Anna Carin Olofsson	Detail
7	2 March 2007	(Finland) Lahti	7.5 km Sprint	(Germany) Martina Glagow	(Germany) Kati Wilhelm	(Russia) Ekaterina Iourieva	(Germany) Kati Wilhelm	Detail
7	4 March 2007	(Finland) Lahti	10 km Pursuit	(Germany) Martina Glagow	(Germany) Kati Wilhelm	(Germany) Kathrin Hitzer	(Germany) Kati Wilhelm	Detail
8	8 March 2007	(Norway) Oslo Holmenkollen	7.5 km Sprint	(Germany) Andrea Henkel	(Russia) Ekaterina Iourieva	(Germany) Magdalena Neuner	(Sweden) Anna Carin Olofsson	Detail
8	10 March 2007	(Norway) Oslo Holmenkollen	10 km Pursuit	(Germany) Magdalena Neuner	(Germany) Andrea Henkel	(Germany) Kati Wilhelm	(Germany) Kati Wilhelm	Detail
8	11 March 2007	(Norway) Oslo Holmenkollen	12.5 km Mass Start	(Germany) Magdalena Neuner	(Germany) Kathrin Hitzer	(Russia) Ekaterina Iourieva	(Germany) Kati Wilhelm	Detail
9	15 March 2007	(Russia) Khanty-Mansiysk	7.5 km Sprint	(Germany) Magdalena Neuner	(Germany) Andrea Henkel	(Sweden) Anna Carin Olofsson	(Germany) Kati Wilhelm	Detail
9	17 March 2007	(Russia) Khanty-Mansiysk	10 km Pursuit	(Germany) Magdalena Neuner	(Sweden) Anna Carin Olofsson	(Germany) Andrea Henkel	(Sweden) Anna Carin Olofsson	Detail
9	18 March 2007	(Russia) Khanty-Mansiysk	12.5 km Mass Start	(Sweden) Helena Jonsson	(Ukraine) Oksana Khvostenko	(Germany) Kathrin Hitzer	(Germany) Andrea Henkel	Detail

=== Men's team ===
Event	Date	Place	Discipline	Winner	Second	Third
2	10 December 2006	(Austria) Hochfilzen	4x7.5 km Relay	Russia Ivan Tcherezov; Dmitry Yaroshenko; Maxim Tchoudov; Sergei Rozhkov	Germany Michael Rösch; Alexander Wolf; Sven Fischer; Andreas Birnbacher	France Julien Robert; Vincent Defrasne; Ferréol Cannard; Raphael Poiree
3	17 December 2006	(Austria) Hochfilzen	4x7.5 km Relay	Norway Emil Hegle Svendsen; Frode Andresen; Lars Berger; Halvard Hanevold	Russia Ivan Tcherezov; Maxim Tchoudov; Dmitry Yaroshenko; Nikolay Kruglov	Germany Ricco Gross; Michael Rösch; Sven Fischer; Michael Greis
4	4 January 2007	(Germany) Oberhof	4x7.5 km Relay	Russia Ivan Tcherezov; Maxim Tchoudov; Dmitry Yaroshenko; Nikolay Kruglov	Germany Michael Rösch; Sven Fischer; Andreas Birnbacher; Michael Greis	Norway Ole Einar Bjørndalen; Lars Berger; Emil Hegle Svendsen; Halvard Hanevold
5	11 January 2007	(Germany) Ruhpolding	4x7.5 km Relay	Norway Emil Hegle Svendsen; Halvard Hanevold; Frode Andresen; Ole Einar Bjørndalen	Russia Ivan Tcherezov; Maxim Tchoudov; Dmitry Yaroshenko; Nikolay Kruglov	Germany Ricco Gross; Michael Rösch; Andreas Birnbacher; Alexander Wolf
WC	10 February 2007	(Italy) Antholz-Anterselva	4x7.5 km Relay	Russia Ivan Tcherezov; Maxim Tchoudov; Dmitry Yaroshenko; Nikolay Kruglov	Norway Halvard Hanevold; Lars Berger; Frode Andresen; Ole Einar Bjørndalen	Germany Ricco Gross; Michael Rösch; Sven Fischer; Michael Greis

=== Women's team ===
Event	Date	Place	Discipline	Winner	Second	Third
2	10 December 2006	(Austria) Hochfilzen	4x6 km Relay	Russia Anna Bogaliy-Titovets; Olga Anisimova; Irina Malgina; Natalia Guseva	Germany Martina Glagow; Andrea Henkel; Magdalena Neuner; Kati Wilhelm	Norway Tora Berger; Ann Kristin Flatland; Jori Morkve; Linda Grubben
3	17 December 2006	(Austria) Hochfilzen	4x6 km Relay	France Florence Baverel-Robert; Delphyne Peretto; Sylvie Becaert; Sandrine Bailly	Russia Anna Bogaliy-Titovets; Tatiana Moiseeva; Anna Boulygina; Natalia Guseva	China Kong Yingchao; Dong Xue; Yin Qiao; Liu Xianying
4	3 January 2007	(Germany) Oberhof	4x6 km Relay	France Florence Baverel-Robert; Delphyne Peretto; Sylvie Becaert; Sandrine Bailly	Germany Martina Glagow; Andrea Henkel; Kathrin Hitzer; Kati Wilhelm	China Kong Yingchao; Dong Xue; Yin Qiao; Liu Xianying
5	10 January 2007	(Germany) Ruhpolding	4x6 km Relay	Russia Anna Bogaliy-Titovets; Olga Anisimova; Irina Malgina; Natalia Guseva	Germany Kathrin Hitzer; Magdalena Neuner; Simone Denkinger; Kati Wilhelm	France Florence Baverel-Robert; Delphyne Peretto; Sylvie Becaert; Sandrine Bailly
WC	11 February 2007	(Italy) Antholz-Anterselva	4x6 km Relay	Germany Martina Glagow; Andrea Henkel; Magdalena Neuner; Kati Wilhelm	France Florence Baverel-Robert; Delphyne Peretto; Sylvie Becaert; Sandrine Bailly	Norway Tora Berger; Ann Kristin Flatland; Jori Morkve; Linda Grubben

== Standings: Men ==
=== Overall ===
Pos.		Points
1.	(Germany) Michael Greis	794
2.	(Norway) Ole Einar Bjørndalen	736
3.	(France) Raphaël Poirée	709
4.	(Russia) Ivan Tcherezov	673
5.	(Russia) Dmitry Yaroshenko	619

- Final standings after 27 races.

=== Individual ===
Pos.		Points
1.	(France) Raphaël Poirée	150
2.	(Germany) Michael Greis	135
3.	(Russia) Ivan Tcherezov	105
4.	(Czech Republic) Michal Šlesingr	103
5.	(Russia) Dmitry Yaroshenko	97

- Final standings after 4 races.

=== Sprint ===
Pos.		Points
1.	(Germany) Michael Greis	299
2.	(Sweden) Björn Ferry	272
3.	(Russia) Nikolay Kruglov	242
4.	(Norway) Halvard Hanevold	232
5.	(Germany) Sven Fischer	223

- Final standings after 10 races.

=== Pursuit ===
Pos.		Points
1.	(Russia) Dmitry Yaroshenko	271
2.	(Norway) Ole Einar Bjørndalen	265
3.	(Russia) Ivan Tcherezov	208
4.	(Russia) Maxim Tchoudov	200
5.	(Germany) Michael Greis	191

- Final standings after 8 races.

=== Mass start ===
Pos.		Points
1.	(Norway) Ole Einar Bjørndalen	180
2.	(Austria) Christoph Sumann	153
3.	(France) Raphaël Poirée	147
4.	(Russia) Ivan Tcherezov	145
5.	(France) Vincent Defrasne	139

- Final standings after 5 races.

=== Relay ===
Pos.		Points
1.	Russia	196
2.	Norway	189
3.	Germany	178
4.	Austria	154
5.	Czech Republic	144

- Final standings after 5 races.

=== Nation ===
Pos.		Points
1.	Russia	6084
2.	Germany	6059
3.	Norway	5992
4.	France	5321
5.	Austria	5065

- Final standings after 19 races.

== Standings: Women ==
=== Overall ===
Pos.		Points
1.	(Germany) Andrea Henkel	870
2.	(Germany) Kati Wilhelm	863
3.	(Sweden) Anna Carin Olofsson	860
4.	(Germany) Magdalena Neuner	720
5.	(France) Florence Baverel-Robert	671

- Final standings after 27 races.

=== Individual ===
Pos.		Points
1.	(Germany) Andrea Henkel	140
2.	(Sweden) Anna Carin Olofsson	111
3.	(Germany) Martina Glagow	109
4.	(France) Florence Baverel-Robert	104
5.	(Norway) Tora Berger	92

- Final standings after 4 races.

=== Sprint ===
Pos.		Points
1.	(Sweden) Anna Carin Olofsson	351
2.	(Germany) Kati Wilhelm	317
3.	(Germany) Andrea Henkel	313
4.	(Germany) Magdalena Neuner	285
5.	(France) Sandrine Bailly	254

- Final standings after 10 races.

=== Pursuit ===
Pos.		Points
1.	(Germany) Kati Wilhelm	284
2.	(Germany) Magdalena Neuner	283
3.	(Germany) Andrea Henkel	267
4.	(Sweden) Anna Carin Olofsson	263
5.	(Norway) Linda Grubben	232

- Final standings after 8 races.

=== Mass start ===
Pos.		Points
1.	(Germany) Kati Wilhelm	169
2.	(Ukraine) Oksana Khvostenko	148
3.	(Russia) Ekaterina Iourieva	136
4.	(Germany) Kathrin Hitzer	134
5.	(Sweden) Helena Jonsson	126

- Final standings after 5 races.

=== Relay ===
Pos.		Points
1.	France	189
2.	Germany	188
3.	Russia	180
4.	Norway	166
5.	China	157

- Final standings after 5 races.

=== Nation ===
Pos.		Points
1.	Germany	6272
2.	Russia	5659
3.	France	5618
4.	Norway	5351
5.	China	5208

- Final standings after 19 races.

== Post-season brief on participants ==
First World Cup career victory:

- Magdalena Gwizdoń (POL), 27, in her 9th season — the WC 1 Sprint in Östersund; first podium was 2004-05 WC 2 IN in Holmenkollen
- Helena Jonsson (SWE), 22, in her 2nd season — the WC 9 Mass start in Khanty-Mansyisk; also her first individual podium
- Oksana Khvostenko (UKR), 29, in her 11th season — the WC 6 Mass start in Pokljuka; first podium was 1998-99 WC 8 MS in Holmenkollen
- Irina Malgina (RUS), 33, in her 5th season — the WC 1 Individual in Östersund; also her first individual podium
- Magdalena Neuner (GER), 19, in her 2nd season — the WC 4 Sprint in Oberhof; also her first individual podium
- Maxim Tchoudov (RUS) 24, in his 3rd season — the WC 9 Pursuit in Khanty-Mansyisk; first podium was 2005-06 WC 3 IN in Brezno-Osrblie
- Ivan Tcherezov (RUS), 26, in his 4th season — the WC 9 Mass start in Khanty-Mansyisk; first podium was 2004-05 WC 3 MS in Östersund

First podium placement:

- Liv Kjersti Eikeland (NOR), 27, in her 5th season — no. 2 in the WC 1 Individual in Östersund
- Simon Fourcade (FRA), 22, in his 3rd season — no. 2 in the WC 7 Individual in Lahti
- Hans Martin Gjedrem (NOR), 26, in his 2nd season — no. 3 in the WC 7 Sprint in Lahti
- Kathrin Hitzer (GER), 20, in her 1st season — no. 3 in the WC 7 Pursuit in Lahti
- Dmitri Yaroshenko (RUS), 30, in his 6th season — no. 2 in the WC 1 Sprint in Östersund
- Zina Kocher (CAN), 23, in her 4th season — no. 3 in the WC 1 Individual in Östersund
- Andrei Makoveev (RUS), 23, in his 3rd season — no. 3 in the WC 9 Sprint in Khanty-Mansyisk
- Tatiana Moiseeva (RUS), 25, in her 2nd season — no. 2 in the WC 6 Sprint in Pokljuka
- Alexander Os (NOR), 27, in his 3rd season — no. 2 in the WC 7 Sprint in Lahti
- Matthias Simmen (SUI), 34, in his 5th season — no. 3 in the WC 2 Sprint; Switzerland's first podium placement
- Michal Šlesingr (CZE), 24, in his 5th season — no. 2 in the BWCH Sprint in Antholz
- Natalya Sokolova (BLR), 33, in her 6th season — no. 3 in the WC 6 Pursuit in Pokljuka
- Emil Hegle Svendsen (NOR), 21, in his 2nd season — no. 3 in the WC 5 Sprint in Ruhpolding

== Achievements ==
Victory in this World Cup (all-time number of victories in parentheses)

Men

- Ole Einar Bjørndalen (NOR), 11 (74) first places
- Raphaël Poirée (FRA), 6 (44) first places
- Michael Greis (GER), 2 (5) first places
- Nikolay Kruglov (RUS), 2 (3) first places
- Christoph Sumann (AUT), 2 (3) first places
- Alexander Wolf (GER), 1 (3) first place
- Michael Rösch (GER), 1 (2) first place
- Maxim Chudov (RUS), 1 (1) first place
- Ivan Tcherezov (RUS), 1 (1) first place

Women

- Magdalena Neuner (GER), 7 (7) first places
- Andrea Henkel (GER), 6 (10) first places
- Anna Carin Olofsson (SWE), 3 (9) first places
- Linda Grubben (NOR), 3 (8) first places
- Martina Glagow (GER), 2 (11) first places
- Sandrine Bailly (FRA), 1 (16) first place
- Kati Wilhelm (GER), 1 (16) first place
- Irina Malgina (RUS), 1 (1) first place
- Magdalena Gwizdoń (POL), 1 (1) first place
- Oksana Khvostenko (UKR), 1 (1) first place
- Helena Jonsson (SWE), 1 (1) first place

== Retirements ==
Following notable biathletes retired during or after the 2006–07 season:

- Ricco Gross (GER)
- Sven Fischer (GER)
- Wilfried Pallhuber (ITA)
- Egil Gjelland (NOR)
- Sergei Rozhkov (RUS)
- Sergei Tchepikov (RUS)
- Irina Nikulchina (BUL)
- Christelle Gros (FRA)
- Florence Baverel-Robert (FRA)
- Katrin Apel (GER)
- Linda Grubben (NOR)
- Irina Malgina (RUS)
- Sona Mihokova (SVK)
- Nina Lemesh (UKR)
- Olena Petrova (UKR)
