= Svetlana Sleptsova =

Russian biathlete (born 1986)

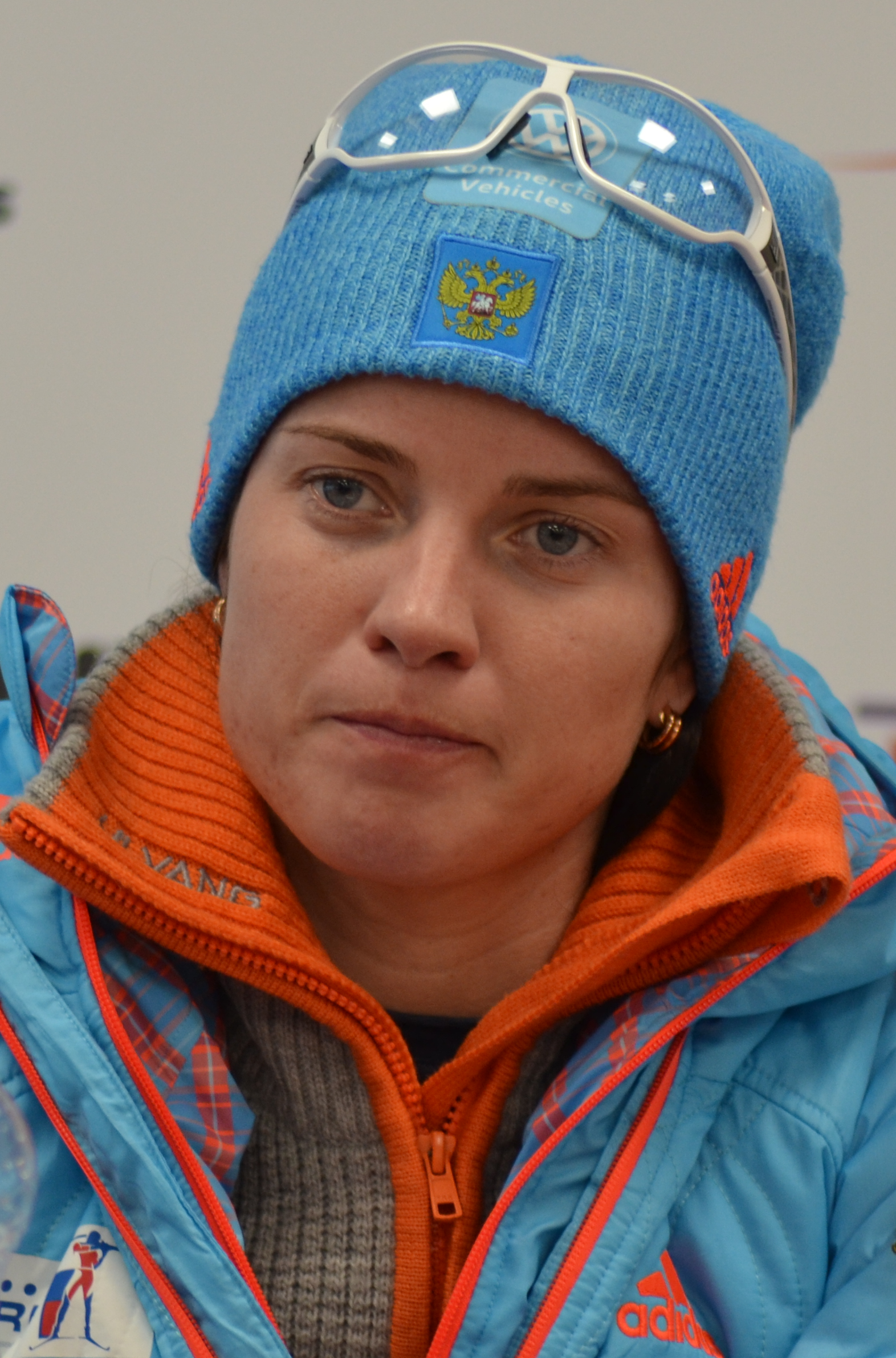
- Sleptsova in 2017

Personal information
- Full name: Svetlana Yuryevna Sleptsova
- Born: 31 July 1986 (age 39) Khanty-Mansiysk, RSFSR, Soviet Union
- Height: 1.62 m (5 ft 4 in)
- Website: svetlana-sleptsova.ru

Sport

Professional information
- Sport: Biathlon
- Club: CSKA
- Skis: Fischer
- Rifle: Anschütz
- World Cup debut: 17 January 2007
- Retired: 27 August 2017

Olympic Games
- Teams: 1 (2010)
- Medals: 1 (1 gold)

World Championships
- Teams: 5 (2008, 2009, 2011, 2012, 2017)
- Medals: 2 (1 gold)

World Cup
- Seasons: 10 (2007–2013, 2016–2017)
- Individual races: 125
- All races: 156
- Individual victories: 5
- All victories: 11
- Individual podiums: 16
- All podiums: 32
Medal record
Women's biathlon
Representing Russia
Olympic Games
Gold medal – first place	2010 Vancouver	4 × 6 km relay
World Championships
Gold medal – first place	2009 Pyeongchang	4 × 6 km relay
Bronze medal – third place	2008 Östersund	Mixed relay
Junior World Championships
Gold medal – first place	2007 Martell	7.5 km sprint
Gold medal – first place	2007 Martell	10 km pursuit
Bronze medal – third place	2006 Presque Isle	3 × 6 km relay
Youth World Championships
Gold medal – first place	2005 Kontiolahti	10 km individual
Silver medal – second place	2005 Kontiolahti	7.5 km pursuit
Bronze medal – third place	2005 Kontiolahti	3 × 6 km relay
European Championships
Gold medal – first place	2017 Duszniki-Zdrój	single mixed relay
Silver medal – second place	2017 Duszniki-Zdrój	15 km individual
Silver medal – second place	2017 Duszniki-Zdrój	7.5 km sprint
Bronze medal – third place	2017 Duszniki-Zdrój	10 km pursuit
- Updated on 21 December 2016

Svetlana Yuryevna Sleptsova (Russian: Светлана Юрьевна Слепцова; born 31 July 1986 in Khanty Mansiysk) is a retired Russian biathlete. She is a member of the club CSKA (Central Sports Club of the Army). She is a three-time Junior World Champion and won the bronze medal in the mixed relay at the 2008 World Championships in Östersund. In 2009, she was part of the gold medal winning Russian women's relay team at the World Championships in Pyeongchang. Sleptsova is an Olympic champion in relay at Vancouver.

In February 2020, Sleptsova was found guilty of an anti-doping violation and had her results from 2013-14 disqualified. She was further identified as being a protected athlete as part of the Russian state doping program by whistleblower Grigory Rodchenkov, in which he alleges that her positive drug test from an in-competition test result was attributed to another athlete through state intervention.

== Career ==
Sleptsova achieved her first success in 2001, when she won the A. Strepetova prize at the Russian Youth Championships. In 2005 she won the individual competition at the Youth World Championships in Kontiolahti (Finland), 1:15 minutes ahead of Vita Semerenko. She did her World Cup debut at Pokljuka in 2007. She achieved two victories at Martell—in the sprint and pursuit competitions, respectively. At the Senior Russian Championships she won three medals, and received a ticket to the country's main national team.

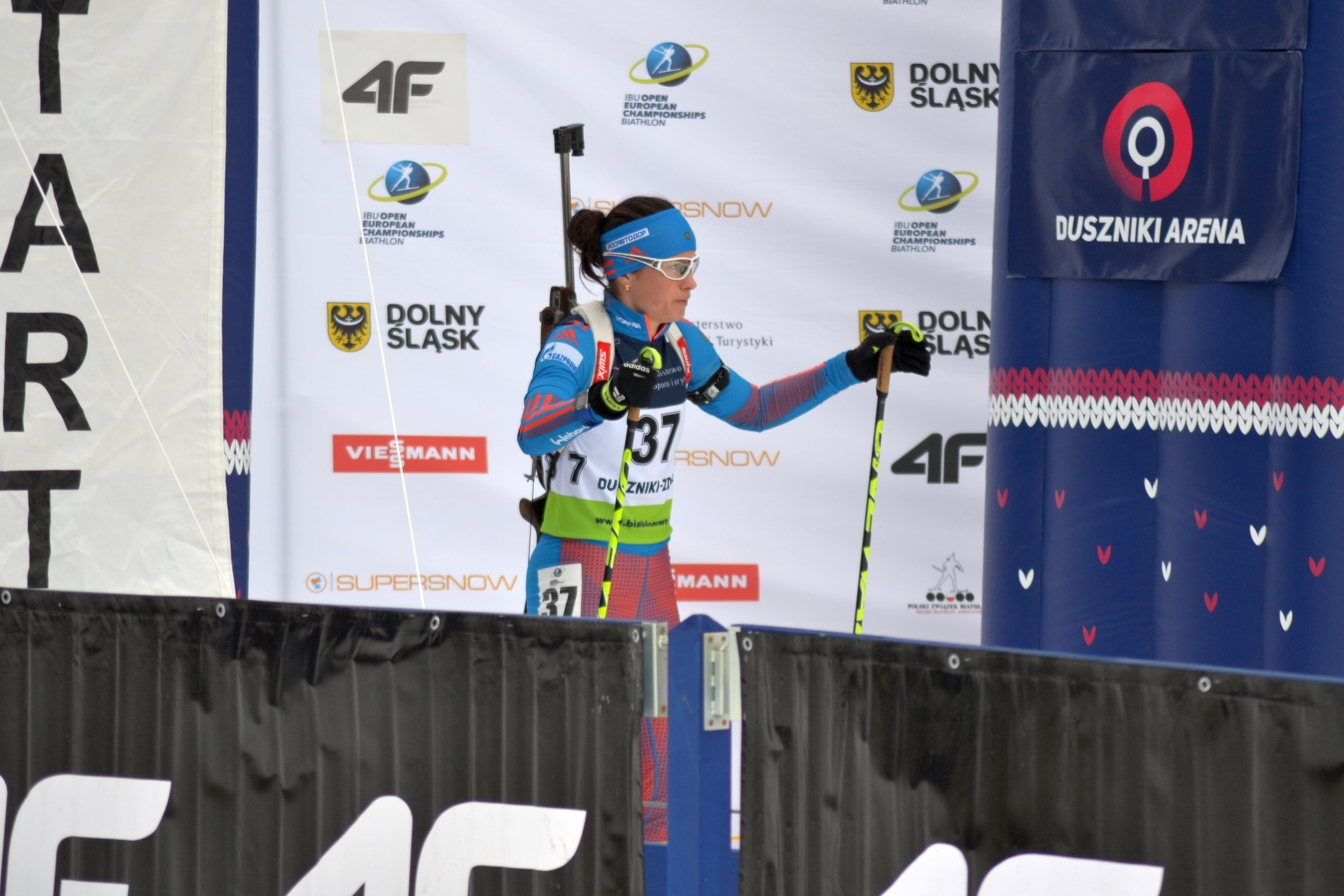
Sleptsova at the start to her silver winning individual race at the 2017 European Championships

Sleptsova finished the sprint at Oberhof, Germany as second, and repeated this result in the subsequent week at Ruhpolding. Later, after the disqualification of Kaisa Varis (Finland), she was awarded the victory of this competition. Sleptsova arrived at the 2008 World Championships in Östersund and won the bronze medal in the mixed relay competition. At the end of the season, at Oslo-Holmenkollen, she achieved her first "real" victory, finally standing on top of the pedestal, and won the pursuit competition as well. She came up with similar results at the 2008 Russian Championships, winning three gold medals and the grand prize—a car. As of 2009, she has three world cup victories, excluding the one Varis retrieved after being cleared to compete again after IBU had broken test correction process.

Sleptsova's last competition was the 2017 Summer Biathlon World Championships in Chaykovskiy, Russia. There, she won on all three disciplines (sprint, pursuit and mixed). Following that, Sleptsova announced her retirement on 27 August 2017, to instead focus on family life.

== Biathlon results ==
All results are sourced from the International Biathlon Union.

=== Olympic Games ===
- 1 medal (1 gold)

Event	Individual	Sprint	Pursuit	Mass start	Relay	Mixed relay
(Canada) 2010 Vancouver	—	13th	18th	14th	Gold	—N/a

* The mixed relay was added as an event in 2014.

=== World Championships ===
- 2 medals (1 gold, 1 bronze)

Event	Individual	Sprint	Pursuit	Mass start	Relay	Mixed relay
(Sweden) 2008 Östersund	—	6th	8th	17th	4th	Bronze
(South Korea) 2009 Pyeongchang	—	36th	28th	19th	Gold	5th
(Russia) 2011 Khanty-Mansiysk	—	—	—	—	8th	6th
(Germany) 2012 Ruhpolding	7th	7th	16th	24th	7th	—
(Austria) 2017 Hochfilzen	71st	33rd	24th	—	10th	—

* During Olympic seasons competitions are only held for those events not included in the Olympic program.

=== Junior/Youth World Championships ===
- 6 medals (3 gold, 1 silver, 2 bronze)

Event	Individual	Sprint	Pursuit	Relay
(France) 2004 Haute-Maurienne	11th	42nd	16th	4th
(Finland) 2005 Kontiolahti	Gold	7th	Silver	Bronze
(United States) 2006 Presque Isle	6th	18th	14th	Bronze
(Italy) 2007 Martell-Val Martello	5th	Gold	Gold	4th

=== Individual podiums ===
- 5 victories – (3 Sp, 2 Pu)
- 16 podiums – (7 Sp, 6 Pu, 2 MS, 1 In)

No.	Season	Date	Location	Discipline	Level	Place
1	2007/08	5 January 2008	Oberhof, Germany	7.5 km Sprint	World Cup	2nd
2	2007/08	11 January 2008	Ruhpolding, Germany	7.5 km Sprint	World Cup	2nd
3	2007/08	17 January 2008	Antholz, Italy	7.5 km Sprint	World Cup	3rd
4	2007/08	19 January 2008	Antholz, Italy	10 km Pursuit	World Cup	2nd
5	2007/08	9 March 2008	Khanty-Mansiysk, Russia	12.5 km Mass Start	World Cup	3rd
6	2007/08	13 March 2008	Holmenkollen, Norway	7.5 km Sprint	World Cup	1st
7	2007/08	15 March 2008	Holmenkollen, Norway	10 km Pursuit	World Cup	1st
8	2008/09	7 December 2008	Östersund, Sweden	10 km Pursuit	World Cup	2nd
9	2008/09	12 December 2008	Hochfilzen, Austria	7.5 km Sprint	World Cup	2nd
10	2008/09	13 December 2008	Hochfilzen, Austria	10 km Pursuit	World Cup	2nd
11	2008/09	18 December 2008	Hochfilzen, Austria	15 km Individual	World Cup	2nd
12	2008/09	29 December 2008	Hochfilzen, Austria	7.5 km Sprint	World Cup	1st
13	2009/10	12 December 2009	Hochfilzen, Austria	10 km Pursuit	World Cup	2nd
14	2009/10	19 December 2009	Pokljuka, Slovenia	7.5 km Sprint	World Cup	1st
15	2009/10	20 December 2009	Pokljuka, Slovenia	10 km Pursuit	World Cup	1st
16	2010/11	9 January 2011	Oberhof, Germany	12.5 km Mass Start	World Cup	3rd

* Results are from UIPMB and IBU races which include the Biathlon World Cup, Biathlon World Championships and the Winter Olympic Games.

=== Relay podiums ===
- 6 victories – (6 RL)
- 16 podiums – (14 RL, 2 MR)

No.	Season	Date	Location	Discipline	Level	Place	Teammates
1	2007/08	9 December 2007	Hochfilzen, Austria	4x6 km Relay	World Cup	2nd	(with Anisimova / Moiseeva / Iourieva)
2	2007/08	16 December 2007	Pokljuka, Slovenia	4x6 km Relay	World Cup	2nd	(with Neupokoeva / Sorokina / Iourieva)
3	2007/08	3 January 2008	Oberhof, Germany	4x6 km Relay	World Cup	3rd	(with Neupokoeva / Sorokina / Iourieva)
4	2007/08	9 January 2008	Ruhpolding, Germany	4x6 km Relay	World Cup	3rd	(with Anisimova / Iourieva / Sorokina)
5	2007/08	12 February 2008	Östersund, Sweden	Mixed 2x6+2x7.5 km Relay	World Championships	3rd	(with Neupokoeva / Kruglov / Yaroshenko)
6	2008/09	21 February 2009	Pyeongchang, South Korea	4x6 km Relay	World Championships	1st	(with Boulygina / Medvedtseva / Zaitseva)
7	2008/09	14 March 2009	Vancouver, Canada	4x6 km Relay	World Cup	3rd	(with Boulygina / Medvedtseva / Zaitseva)
8	2009/10	6 December 2009	Östersund, Sweden	4x6 km Relay	World Cup	2nd	(with Boulygina / Medvedtseva / Zaitseva)
9	2009/10	13 December 2009	Hochfilzen, Austria	4x6 km Relay	World Cup	1st	(with Boulygina / Romanova / Zaitseva)
10	2009/10	10 January 2010	Oberhof, Germany	4x6 km Relay	World Cup	1st	(with Bogaliy-Titovets / Boulygina / Medvedtseva)
11	2009/10	23 February 2010	Vancouver, Canada	4x6 km Relay	Olympic Games	1st	(with Bogaliy-Titovets / Medvedtseva / Zaitseva)
12	2010/11	22 January 2011	Antholz, Italy	4x6 km Relay	World Cup	1st	(with Bogaliy-Titovets / Sorokina / Zaitseva)
13	2010/11	5 February 2011	(United States) Presque Isle, USA	Mixed 2x6+2x7.5 km Relay	World Cup	3rd	(with Sorokina / Tcherezov / Tchoudov)
14	2011/12	11 December 2011	Hochfilzen, Austria	4x6 km Relay	World Cup	3rd	(with Sorokina / Bogaliy-Titovets / Zaitseva)
15	2011/12	4 January 2012	Oberhof, Germany	4x6 km Relay	World Cup	1st	(with Glazyrina / Bogaliy-Titovets / Vilukhina)
16	2011/12	21 January 2012	Antholz, Italy	4x6 km Relay	World Cup	3rd	(with Glazyrina / Zaitseva / Vilukhina)

* Results are from UIPMB and IBU races which include the Biathlon World Cup, Biathlon World Championships and the Winter Olympic Games.

=== Overall record ===
Result	Individual	Sprint	Pursuit	Mass Start	Relay	Mixed Relay^{[a]}	Total		
Result	Individual	Sprint	Pursuit	Mass Start	Relay	Mixed Relay^{[a]}	Individual events	Team events	All events
1st place	–	3	2	–	6	–	5	6	11
2nd place	1	3	4	–	3	–	8	3	11
3rd place	–	1	–	2	5	2	3	7	10
Podiums	1	7	6	2	14	2	16	16	32
Top 10	7	19	15	6	22	6	47	28	75
Points	12	46	32	19	22	6	109	28	137
Other	2	13	1	–	3^{[b]}	–	16	3	19
Starts	14	59	33	19	25	6	125	31	156

a. ^{1} Includes mixed relay and single mixed relay, the event involves one male and one female biathlete each completing two legs consisting of one prone and one standing shoot.
b. ^{1} Disqualified (DSQ).

* Statistics as of 8 March 2017.

=== Shooting ===
Shooting	2006–07 season		2007–08 season		2008–09 season		2009–10 season		2010–11 season		2011–12 season	
Prone position	52 / 60	86.7%	163 / 179	91.1%	158 / 183	86.3%	143 / 170	84.1%	169 / 204	82.8%	179 / 213	84.0%
Standing position	45 / 60	75.0%	148 / 181	81.8%	134 / 183	73.2%	140 / 168	83.3%	164 / 205	80.0%	170 / 208	81.7%
Total	97 / 120	80.8%	311 / 360	86.4%	292 / 366	79.8%	283 / 338	83.7%	333 / 409	81.4%	349 / 421	82.9%

Shooting	2012–13 season		2013–14 season		2014–15 season		2015–16 season		2016–17 season		Career	
Prone position	21 / 30	70.0%	5 / 7	71.4%	—	—	4 / 5	80.0%	83 / 97	85.6%	977 / 1148	85.1%
Standing position	27 / 31	87.1%	5 / 6	83.3%	—	—	4 / 5	80.0%	81 / 103	78.6%	918 / 1150	79.8%
Total	48 / 61	78.7%	10 / 13	76.9%	—	—	8 / 10	80.0%	164 / 200	82.0%	1895 / 2298	82.5%

* Results in all IBU World Cup races, Olympics and World Championships including relay events and disqualified races. Statistics as of 8 March 2017.
