= Magdalena Gwizdoń =

Polish biathlete (born 1979)

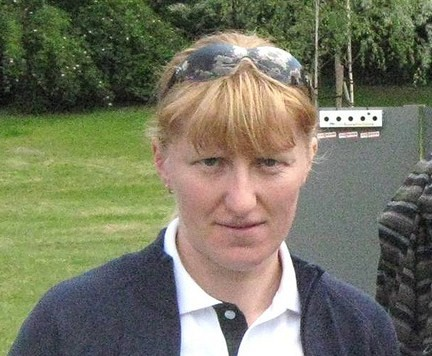
- Gwizdoń in 2009

Personal information
- Born: 4 August 1979 (age 46) Cieszyn, Poland

Sport
- Sport: Skiing
Medal record
Junior World Championships
Bronze medal – third place	1999 Pokljuka	3 × 7.5 km relay
- Updated on 28 February 2013

Magdalena Gwizdoń (born 4 August 1979) is a Polish biathlete. She is the record holder for the women for the most IBU Biathlon World Cup starts with 529 and third overall after Ole Einar Björndalen and Simon Eder.

== Career ==
Gwizdoń competed in the 2006 and 2010 Winter Olympics for Poland. Her best finish was 7th, as part of the 2006 Polish relay team. Her best individual finish was 20th in the 2006 sprint. In 2006, she also finished 21st in the pursuit, 29th in the mass start, and 33rd in the individual. In 2010, she finished 35th in the sprint, 31st in the pursuit, 59th in the individual and 12th as part of the relay team.

As of February 2013, her best performance at the Biathlon World Championships is 6th, as part of the 2008 Polish mixed relay team, and again with the 2009 women's relay team. Her best individual performance is 7th in the 2008 sprint.

As of February 2013, Gwizdoń has finished on the podium six times in the Biathlon World Cup. This includes one victory, taken in a sprint event at Östersund in 2006/07. Her best overall finish in the Biathlon World Cup is 16th, in 2006/07.

== Biathlon results ==
All results are sourced from the International Biathlon Union.

=== Olympic Games ===
0 medals

Event	Individual	Sprint	Pursuit	Mass start	Relay	Mixed relay
(Italy) 2006 Turin	33rd	20th	21st	29th	7th	—
(Canada) 2010 Vancouver	59th	35th	31st	DNS	12th	—
(Russia) 2014 Sochi	32nd	40th	38th	—	10th	13th
(South Korea) 2018 Pyeongchang	83rd	56th	49th	—	7th	16th

:*The mixed relay was added as an event in 2014.

=== World Championships ===
0 medals

Event	Individual	Sprint	Pursuit	Mass start	Relay	Mixed relay	Single mixed relay
(Italy) 2007 Antholz-Anterselva	32nd	14th	17th	16th	10th	11th	—
(Sweden) 2008 Östersund	15th	7th	12th	11th	7th	6th	—
(South Korea) 2009 Pyeongchang	40th	76th	—	—	6th	—	—
(Russia) 2011 Khanty-Mansiysk	73rd	31st	31st	—	9th	16th	—
(Germany) 2012 Ruhpolding	24th	17th	15th	29th	9th	—	—
(Czech Republic) 2013 Nové Město na Moravě	18th	12th	12th	27th	9th	10th	—
(Finland) 2015 Kontiolahti	56th	7th	17th	18th	12th	14th	—
(Norway) 2016 Oslo	12th	55th	30th	23rd	4th	—	—
(Austria) 2017 Hochfilzen	37th	38th	25th	—	7th	—	—
(Sweden) 2019 Östersund	—	55th	46th	—	7th	9th	—
(Italy) 2020 Rasen-Antholz	—	54th	55th	—	7th	—	—

*During Olympic seasons competitions are only held for those events not included in the Olympic program.
**The single mixed relay was added as an event in 2019.

=== World Cup podiums ===
Season	Location	Event	Rank
2002–03	Ruhpolding	Mixed Relay	3rd place, bronze medalist(s)
2004–05	Holmenkollen	Individual	3rd place, bronze medalist(s)
2004–05	Turin	Sprint	2nd place, silver medalist(s)
2006–07	Östersund	Sprint	1st place, gold medalist(s)
2006–07	Östersund	Pursuit	3rd place, bronze medalist(s)
2006–07	Hochfilzen	Sprint	2nd place, silver medalist(s)
2008–09	Hochfilzen	Relay	3rd place, bronze medalist(s)
2012–13	Sochi	Sprint	1st place, gold medalist(s)
