= Florence Baverel-Robert =

French biathlete (born 1974)

Florence Baverel
Personal information
- Born: Florence Baverel; 24 May 1974 (age 52) Pontarlier, Doubs, France
Medal record
Women's biathlon
Representing France
Olympic Games
Gold medal – first place	2006 Torino	7.5 km sprint
Bronze medal – third place	2006 Torino	4 × 7.5 km relay
World Championships
Silver medal – second place	1995 Antholz-Anterselva	4 × 7.5 km relay
Silver medal – second place	1996 Ruhpolding	4 × 7.5 km relay
Silver medal – second place	2007 Antholz-Anterselva	15 km individual
Silver medal – second place	2007 Antholz-Anterselva	4 × 6 km relay
Silver medal – second place	2007 Antholz-Anterselva	Mixed relay
Bronze medal – third place	1996 Ruhpolding	Team event
Bronze medal – third place	1999 Kontiolahti	4 × 7.5 km relay
Bronze medal – third place	2000 Oslo	10 km pursuit
Bronze medal – third place	2006 Pokljuka	Mixed relay

Florence Baverel (born 24 May 1974 in Pontarlier, Doubs), is a retired French biathlete who competed in the biathlon at the 2006 Winter Olympics in Turin, Italy. Baverel-Robert won the gold medal in the women's 7.5 km sprint. She placed 26th in the women's 15 km individual event, 5th in the 12.5 km mass start and 13th in the 10 km pursuit final.

She married fellow French biathlete Julien Robert. They have one daughter Rose. Now they are divorced.

At the end of the 2006-07 World Cup season, which she finished in 5th place in the overall standings (her best career result), she announced the end of her career.

== Achievements ==
- Biathlon World Cup
  - 1 × 5th place in overall (2006/07)
  - 2 × 7th place in overall (1994/95, 1995/96)
  - 1 victory in the trials for the World Cup
