= Irina Malgina =

Russian biathlete (born 1973)

Medal record

Women's biathlon

Representing Russia

World Championships
Gold medal – first place	2006 Pokljuka	Mixed relay

Irina Anatolievna Malgina (Russian: Ири́на Анато́льевна Ма́льгина; born in Murmansk on June 8, 1973) is a retired Russian biathlete and sport coach at present.

== Biography ==
Irina Malgina was born in Murmansk, Soviet Union. At school she had engaged in Sambo, figure skating and skiing caused the greatest interest. The first sporting success was the victory in Apatity on the Feast of the North among schoolchild in 1980s, where she was its overall champion. In 1990, Irina passed on the leadership of coach Yevgeny Komarov, and executed the qualifying standard of the candidate for master of sports. In the same year she entered the Murmansk State Pedagogical University on specialty "primary school and physical education teacher". After 3 years she has been able to comply with the standard master of sports, and then in 1996 won the Championship of Russia became an international master. However, the most progress began since her move to Khanty-Mansiysk in 1997, when she first won at the 1999 European Championships in Izhevsk. During the 2001 Winter Universiade in Zakopane, she won gold medals in the 7.5 km sprint, 10 km pursuit and 3 × 7.5 km relay. Later on, she succeeded in winning Continental gold medals another five times during the 2002-2005 year. At the 2006 Biathlon World Championships Irina Malgina was part of the mixed-relay that won owing to her and Nikolay Kruglov, Jr. accurate shooting at the last stage.
