= Biathlon World Championships 2007 – Women's relay =

2007 biathlon results

Below are the results of the 2007 Biathlon World Championships 2007 for the men's relay, which took place on 11 February 2007.

== Results ==
Rank	Nation	P	S	T	Result	Behind
1	Germany (GER)	0+2	0+5	0+7	1:14:19.1	0
2	France (FRA)	0+2	1+5	1+7	1:15:26.9	+1:07.8
3	Norway (NOR)	0+0	1+6	1+6	1:15:48.8	+1:29.7
4	Slovenia (SLO)	0+3	0+4	0+7	1:16:11.8	+1:52.7
5	Belarus (BLR)	1+5	0+5	1+10	1:16:17.2	+1:58.1
6	People's Republic of China (CHN)	0+2	0+7	0+9	1:16:20.1	+2:01.0
7	(Russia) Russian Federation (RUS)	0+2	2+8	2+10	1:16:29.0	+2:09.9
8	Italy (ITA)	0+1	0+3	0+4	1:17:46.5	+3:27.4
9	Ukraine (UKR)	0+3	1+6	1+9	1:18:11.4	+3:52.3
10	Poland (POL)	0+5	1+4	1+9	1:18:49.3	+4:30.2
11	Romania (ROM)	0+3	0+2	0+5	1:19:45.2	+5:26.1
12	Finland (FIN)	0+4	2+8	2+12	1:21:49.8	+7:30.7
13	Estonia (EST)	1+5	2+5	3+10	1:22:09.1	+7:50.0
14	Canada (CAN)	0+5	1+4	1+9	1:22:58.3	+8:39.2
15	Slovakia (SVK)	0+8	3+12	3+20	1:23:09.8	+8:50.7
16	Bulgaria (BUL)	1+7	4+12	5+19	1:24:41.9	+10:22.8
-	United States of America (USA)	-	-	-	DNS	-
