= Biathlon World Championships 2007 – Men's relay =

Sport result

Below are the results of the 2007 Biathlon World Championships 2007 for the men's relay, which took place on 10 February 2007.

== Results ==
Rank	Nation	P	S	T	Result	Behind
1	(Russia) Russian Federation (RUS)	0+0	0+1	0+1	1:14:36.1	0
2	Norway (NOR)	0+4	1+7	1+11	1:15:36.6	+1:00.5
3	Germany (GER)	0+2	2+11	2+13	1:16:08.6	+1:32.5
4	Italy (ITA)	0+1	0+6	0+7	1:16:41.4	+2:05.3
5	Czech Republic (CZE)	1+5	0+3	1+8	1:16:52.8	+2:16.7
6	Austria (AUT)	0+1	0+5	0+6	1:16:58.1	+2:22.0
7	Sweden (SWE)	0+5	0+6	0+11	1:17:24.2	+2:48.1
8	Ukraine (UKR)	0+4	1+5	1+9	1:17:44.2	+3:08.1
9	United States of America (USA)	0+6	0+9	0+15	1:18:03.0	+3:26.9
10	France (FRA)	0+3	2+8	2+11	1:18:17.6	+3:41.5
11	Estonia (EST)	0+2	2+6	2+8	1:18:40.0	+4:03.9
12	Latvia (LAT)	1+7	0+5	1+12	1:18:56.4	+4:20.3
13	Poland (POL)	0+4	0+4	0+8	1:19:27.8	+4:51.7
14	Canada (CAN)	0+5	0+8	0+13	1:19:35.6	+4:59.5
15	Slovakia (SVK)	0+2	2+6	2+8	1:19:43.7	+5:07.6
16	Switzerland (SUI)	0+6	4+10	4+16	1:20:36.2	+6:00.1
17	China (CHN)	0+6	3+7	3+13	1:21:07.2	+6:31.1
18	Bulgaria (BUL)	0+1	2+7	2+8	1:21:15.3	+6:39.2
19	Slovenia (SLO)	0+5	3+9	3+14	1:21:17.6	+6:41.5
20	Belarus (BLR)	0+6	3+8	3+14	1:21:20.0	+6:43.9
21	(United Kingdom) Great Britain (GBR)	1+7	3+11	4+18	1:29:55.9	+15:19.8
-	Finland (FIN)	-	-	-	DNS	-
