= Halvard Hanevold =

Norwegian biathlete (1969–2019)

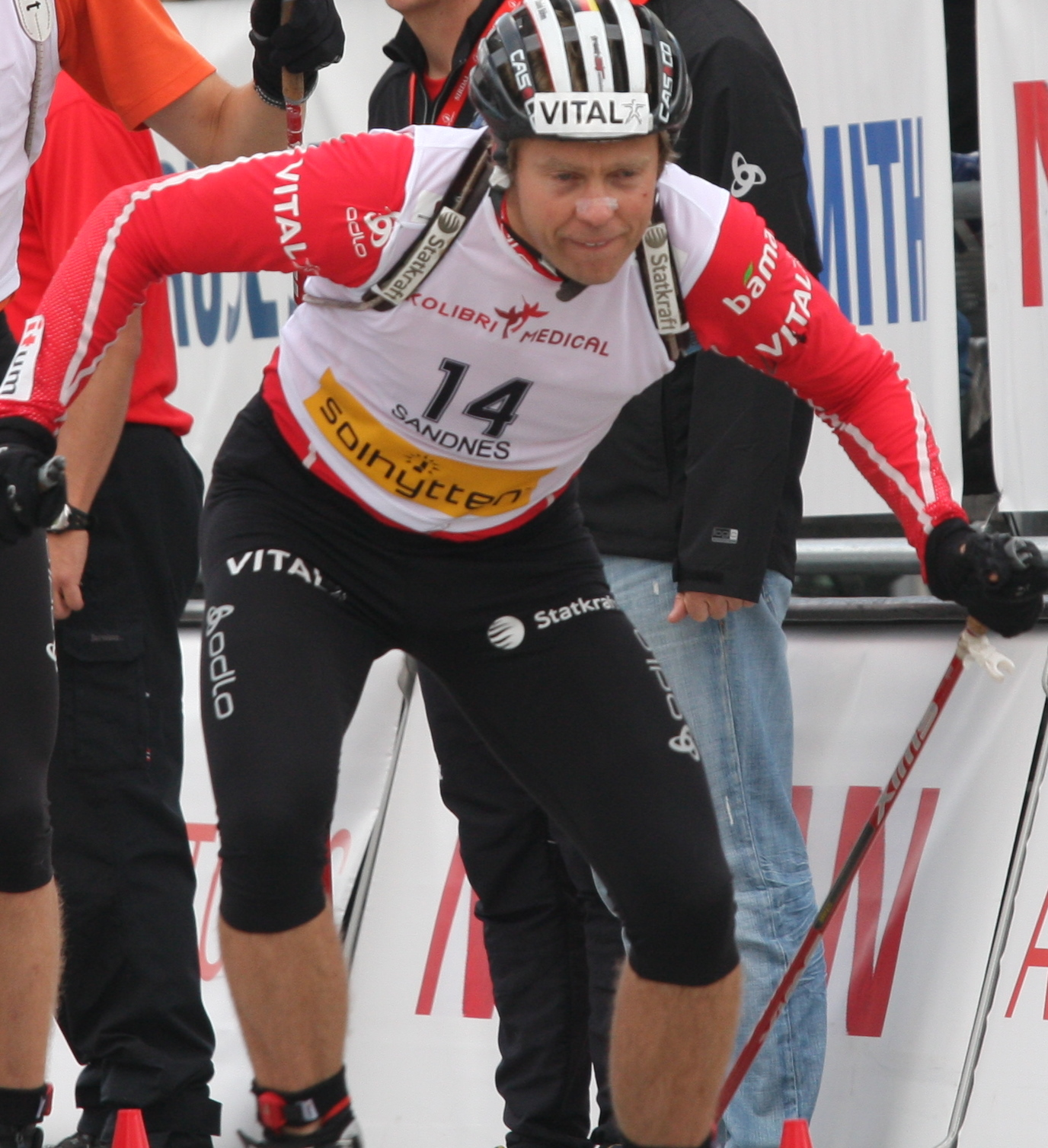
- Hanevold in 2009

Personal information
- Full name: Halvard Hanevold
- Born: 3 December 1969 Askim, Norway
- Died: 3 September 2019 (aged 49) Asker, Norway
- Height: 1.80 m (5 ft 11 in)

Sport

Professional information
- Sport: Biathlon
- Club: Asker Skiklubb
- World Cup debut: 8 March 1992
- Retired: 27 March 2010

Olympic Games
- Teams: 5 (1994, 1998, 2002, 2006, 2010)
- Medals: 6 (3 gold)

World Championships
- Teams: 16 (1994, 1995, 1996, 1997, 1998, 1999, 2000, 2001, 2002, 2003, 2004, 2005, 2006, 2007, 2008, 2009)
- Medals: 16 (5 gold)

World Cup
- Seasons: 19 (1991/92–2009/10)
- Individual victories: 9
- All victories: 33
- Individual podiums: 40
- All podiums: 97
- Discipline titles: 2: 2 Individual (1997–98, 2002–03)
Medal record
Men's biathlon
Representing Norway
Olympic Games
Gold medal – first place	1998 Nagano	20 km individual
Gold medal – first place	2002 Salt Lake City	4 × 7.5 km relay
Gold medal – first place	2010 Vancouver	4 × 7.5 km relay
Silver medal – second place	1998 Nagano	4 × 7.5 km relay
Silver medal – second place	2006 Torino	10 km sprint
Bronze medal – third place	2006 Torino	20 km individual
World Championships
Gold medal – first place	1995 Antholz-Anterselva	Team event
Gold medal – first place	1998 Hochfilzen	Team event
Gold medal – first place	2003 Khanty-Mansiysk	20 km individual
Gold medal – first place	2005 Hochfilzen	4 × 7.5 km relay
Gold medal – first place	2009 Pyeongchang	4 × 7.5 km relay
Silver medal – second place	2000 Lahti	4 × 7.5 km relay
Silver medal – second place	2003 Khanty-Mansiysk	12.5 km pursuit
Silver medal – second place	2004 Oberhof	4 × 7.5 km relay
Silver medal – second place	2006 Pokljuka	Mixed relay
Silver medal – second place	2007 Antholz-Anterselva	4 × 7.5 km relay
Silver medal – second place	2008 Östersund	10 km sprint
Silver medal – second place	2008 Östersund	4 × 7.5 km relay
Bronze medal – third place	1999 Kontiolahti	4 × 7.5 km relay
Bronze medal – third place	2001 Pokljuka	10 km sprint
Bronze medal – third place	2001 Pokljuka	4 × 7.5 km relay
Bronze medal – third place	2009 Pyeongchang	10 km sprint

Halvard Hanevold (3 December 1969 – 3 September 2019) was a Norwegian biathlete.

== Career ==
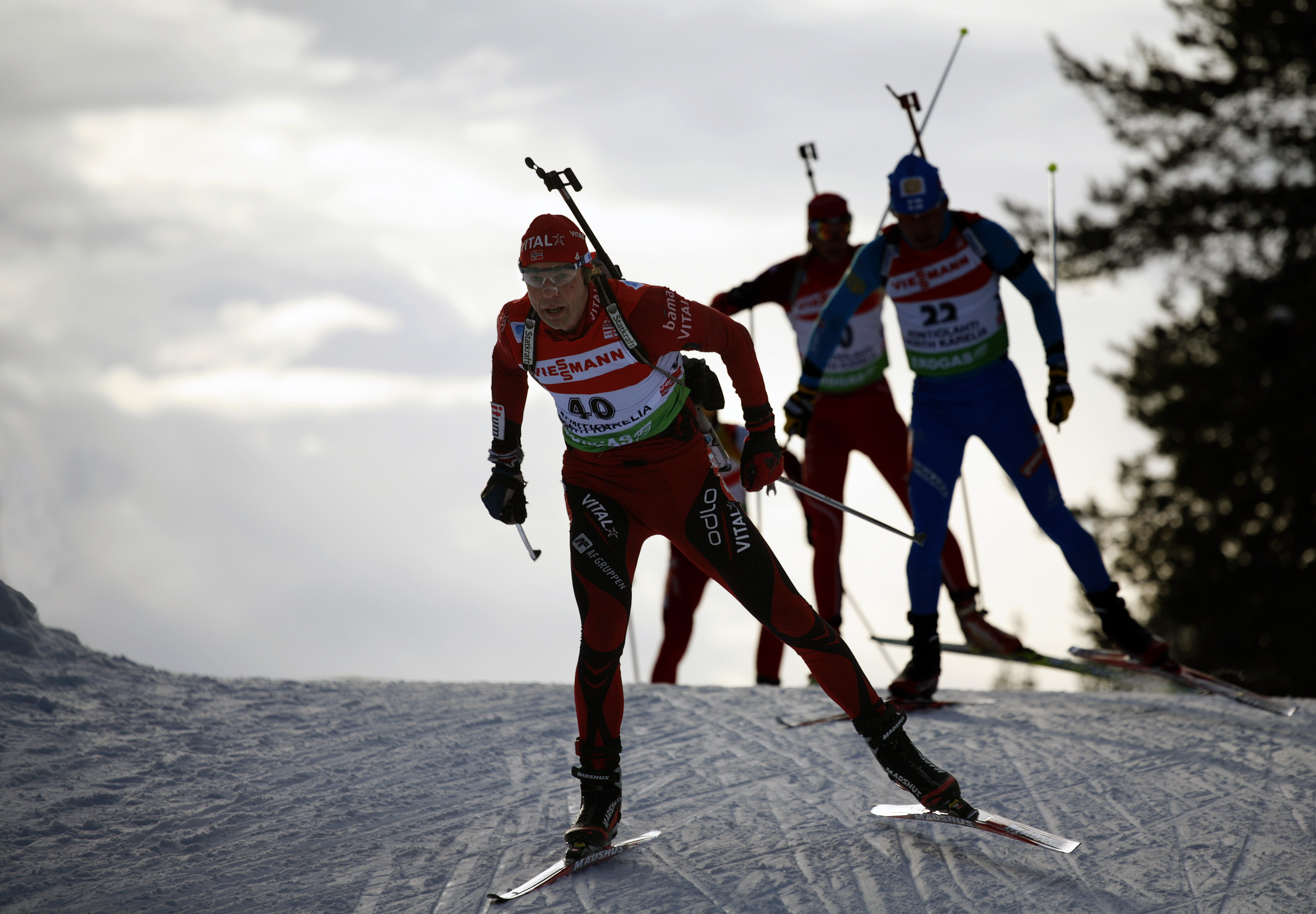
Halvard Hanevold Kontiolahti 2010

Hanevold won medals in biathlon events at the 1998 Winter Olympics and the 2002 Winter Olympics by winning his first Olympic gold followed by another gold four years later. He won the bronze medal in the men's 20 km individual and the silver medal in the men's 10 km sprint at the 2006 Winter Olympics. He won the last medal of his Olympic career in the 4 × 7.5 km relay at the Vancouver 2010 Winter Olympics.

Hanevold participated in 16 World Championships from 1994 to 2009. He was a part of the team in 1993 in Borovets as a reserve, but did not participate in any races.

In his career, he recorded 40 podiums at World Cup level, with the last podium being in the final race of his final season.

Hanevold retired after the 2009–10 season.

He was a close friend to Swedish biathlete Björn Ferry.

== Death ==
Hanevold died on 3 September 2019 at the age of 49 in his home in Asker, Akershus.

== Biathlon results ==
All results are sourced from the International Biathlon Union.

=== Olympic Winter Games ===
6 medals (3 gold, 2 silver, 1 bronze)

Event	Individual	Sprint	Pursuit	Mass start	Relay
(Norway) 1994 Lillehammer	46th	—	—N/a	—N/a	7th
(Japan) 1998 Nagano	Gold	8th	—N/a	—N/a	Silver
(United States) 2002 Salt Lake City	5th	13th	8th	—N/a	Gold
(Italy) 2006 Turin	Bronze	Silver	5th	7th	5th
(Canada) 2010 Vancouver	—	24th	17th	19th	Gold

*Pursuit was added as an event in 2002, with mass start being added in 2006.

=== World Championships ===
16 medals (5 gold, 7 silver, 4 bronze)

Event	Individual	Sprint	Pursuit	Mass start	Team	Relay	Mixed relay
(Canada) 1994 Canmore	—N/a	—N/a	—N/a	—N/a	4th	—N/a	—N/a
(Italy) 1995 Antholz-Anterselva	—	—	—N/a	—N/a	Gold	—	—N/a
(Germany) 1996 Ruhpolding	34th	—	—N/a	—N/a	4th	—	—N/a
(Slovakia) 1997 Brezno-Osrblie	—	—	—	—N/a	4th	—	—N/a
(Slovenia) 1998 Pokljuka	—N/a	—N/a	13th	—N/a	Gold	—N/a	—N/a
(Finland) 1999 Kontiolahti	37th	13th	13th	17th	—N/a	Bronze	—N/a
(Norway) 2000 Oslo Holmenkollen	10th	12th	5th	10th	—N/a	Silver	—N/a
(Slovenia) 2001 Pokljuka	44th	Bronze	9th	9th	—N/a	Bronze	—N/a
(Norway) 2002 Oslo Holmenkollen	—N/a	—N/a	—N/a	12th	—N/a	—N/a	—N/a
(Russia) 2003 Khanty-Mansiysk	Gold	4th	Silver	8th	—N/a	4th	—N/a
(Germany) 2004 Oberhof	38th	18th	5th	5th	—N/a	Silver	—N/a
(Austria) 2005 Hochfilzen	30th	—	—	11th	—N/a	Gold	10th
(Slovenia) 2006 Pokljuka	—N/a	—N/a	—N/a	—N/a	—N/a	—N/a	Silver
(Italy) 2007 Antholz-Anterselva	10th	23rd	20th	18th	—N/a	Silver	—
(Sweden) 2008 Östersund	17th	Silver	9th	5th	—N/a	Silver	—
(South Korea) 2009 Pyeongchang	71st	Bronze	6th	13th	—N/a	Gold	—

*During Olympic seasons competitions are only held for those events not included in the Olympic program.
**Team was removed as an event in 1998, and pursuit was added in 1997 with mass start being added in 1999 and the mixed relay in 2005.

=== Individual victories ===
9 victories (4 In, 2 Sp, 1 Pu, 2 MS)

Season	Date	Location	Discipline	Level
1997–98; 2 victories (2 In)	15 January 1998	(Italy) Antholz-Anterselva	20 km individual	Biathlon World Cup
1997–98; 2 victories (2 In)	11 February 1998	(Japan) Nagano	20 km individual	Winter Olympic Games
1998–99; 1 victory (1 Sp)	12 March 1999	(Norway) Oslo Holmenkollen	10 km sprint	Biathlon World Cup
1999–2000; 2 victories (1 In, 1 Pu)	16 January 2000	(Germany) Ruhpolding	12.5 km pursuit	Biathlon World Cup
1999–2000; 2 victories (1 In, 1 Pu)	9 March 2000	(Finland) Lahti	20 km individual	Biathlon World Cup
2002–03; 1 victory (1 In)	19 March 2003	(Russia) Khanty-Mansiysk	20 km individual	Biathlon World Championships
2003–04; 2 victories (1 Sp, 1 MS)	11 January 2004	(Slovenia) Pokljuka	15 km mass start	Biathlon World Cup
2003–04; 2 victories (1 Sp, 1 MS)	17 January 2004	(Germany) Ruhpolding	10 km sprint	Biathlon World Cup
2005–06; 1 victory (1 MS)	8 January 2006	(Germany) Oberhof	15 km mass start	Biathlon World Cup

*Results are from UIPMB and IBU races which include the Biathlon World Cup, Biathlon World Championships and the Winter Olympic Games.
