= Hans Martin Gjedrem =

Norwegian biathlete

Personal information
- Full name: Hans Martin Gjedrem
- Born: 6 June 1980 (age 46) Valldal, Norway

Sport

Professional information
- Sport: Biathlon
- World Cup debut: 15 December 2005
- Retired: 2012

World Cup
- Seasons: 5 (2005/06–2009/10)
- All victories: 1
- Individual podiums: 1
- All podiums: 2

Hans Martin Gjedrem (born 6 June 1980) is a former Norwegian biathlete.

Gjedrem won three medals at the Biathlon Open European Championships. In 2006, he finished third with the Norwegian relay team in Arber, Germany. The following year, he won two silver medals in the individual and relay events in Bansko, Bulgaria.

His best result in the Biathlon World Cup was a third position in the sprint in Lahti, Finland during the 2006-07 Biathlon World Cup season. His best finish in the overall World Cup dates back to the same season when he finished 40th.

He never got to compete at the Biathlon World Championships or the Winter Olympics.
