= Ivan Tcherezov =

Russian biathlete

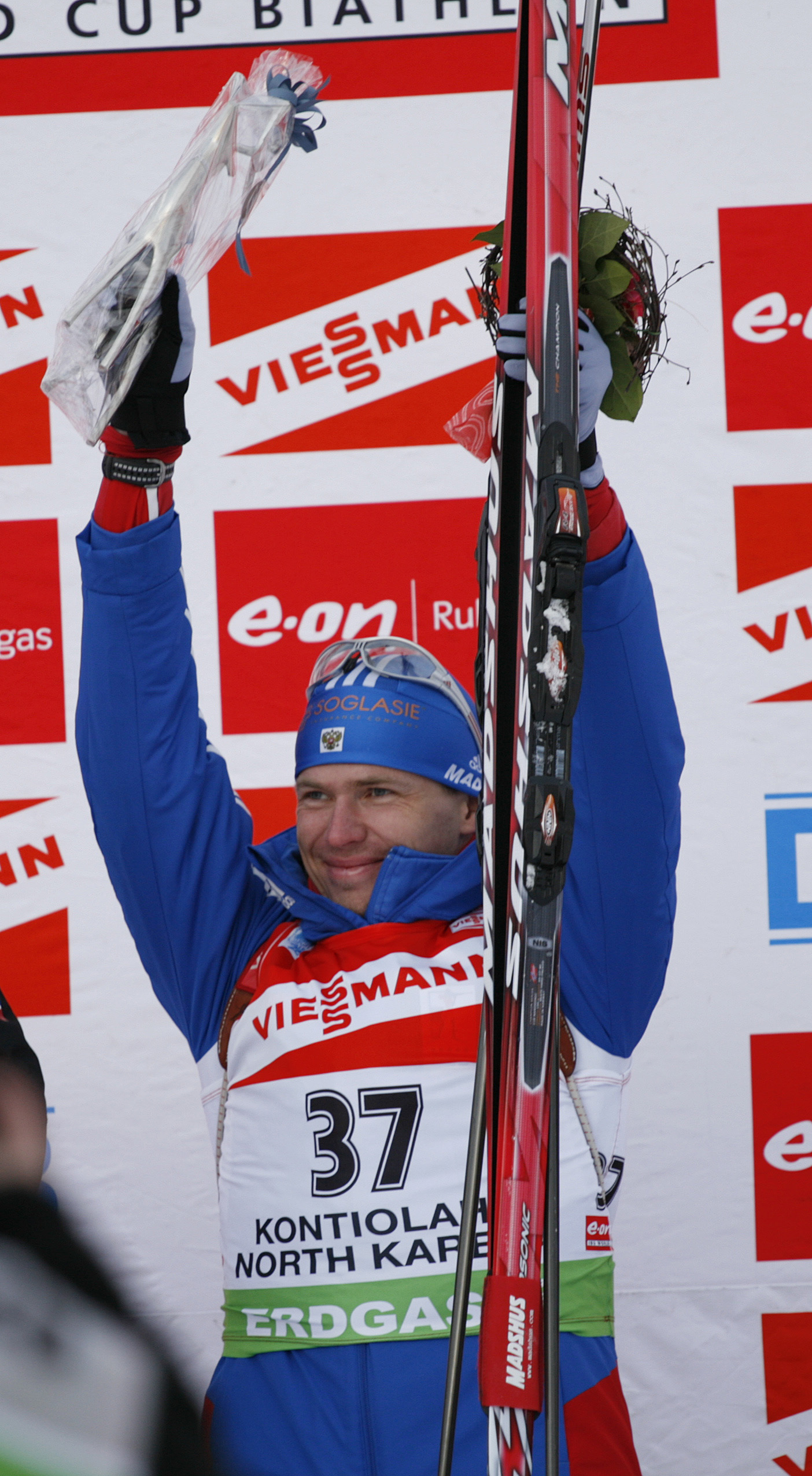

Personal information
- Full name: Ivan Yuryevich Tcherezov
- Born: 18 November 1980 (age 45) Izhevsk, RSFSR, Soviet Union
- Height: 1.73 m (5 ft 8 in)

Sport

Professional information
- Sport: Biathlon
- World Cup debut: 4 December 2003
- Retired: 19 March 2016

Olympic Games
- Teams: 2 (2006, 2010)
- Medals: 1 (0 gold)

World Championships
- Teams: 7 (2005, 2006, 2007, 2008, 2009, 2010, 2011)
- Medals: 4 (3 gold)

World Cup
- Seasons: 12 (2003/04–2010/11; 2012/13–2015/16)
- Individual victories: 7
- All victories: 14
- Individual podiums: 20
- All podiums: 42
Medal record
Men's biathlon
Representing Russia
Olympic Games
Silver medal – second place	2006 Turin	4 × 7.5 km relay
Disqualified	2010 Vancouver	4 × 7.5 km relay
World Championships
Gold medal – first place	2005 Khanty-Mansiysk	Mixed relay
Gold medal – first place	2007 Antholz-Anterselva	4 × 7.5 km relay
Gold medal – first place	2008 Östersund	4 × 7.5 km relay
Disqualified	2011 Khanty-Mansiysk	4 × 7.5 km relay
Bronze medal – third place	2009 Pyeongchang	12.5 km mass start
Junior World Championships
Silver medal – second place	2000 Hochfilzen	4 × 7.5 km relay

Ivan Yuryevich Tcherezov (Russian: Иван Юрьевич Черезов; born 18 November 1980) is a former Russian biathlete. He announced his retirement from biathlon at the end of the 2015–16 season.

== Biathlon results ==
All results are sourced from the International Biathlon Union.

=== Olympic Games ===
1 medal (1 silver)

Event	Individual	Sprint	Pursuit	Mass start	Relay
(Italy) 2006 Turin	8th	5th	15th	—	Silver
(Canada) 2010 Vancouver	15th	10th	6th	6th	DSQ (Bronze)

=== World Championships ===
4 medals (3 gold, 1 bronze)

Event	Individual	Sprint	Pursuit	Mass start	Relay	Mixed relay
(Austria) 2005 Hochfilzen	59th	—	—	26th	—	Gold
(Slovenia) 2006 Pokljuka	—N/a	—N/a	—N/a	—N/a	—N/a	16th
(Italy) 2007 Antholz-Anterselva	6th	22nd	9th	16th	Gold	—
(Sweden) 2008 Östersund	18th	4th	8th	8th	Gold	—
(South Korea) 2009 Pyeongchang	7th	38th	26th	Bronze	6th	5th
(Russia) 2010 Khanty-Mansiysk	—N/a	—N/a	—N/a	—N/a	—N/a	4th
(Russia) 2011 Khanty-Mansiysk	22nd	19th	18th	5th	DSQ (Silver)	6th

*During Olympic seasons competitions are only held for those events not included in the Olympic program.

=== Individual victories ===
7 victories (3 Sp, 2 Pu, 2 MS)

Season	Date	Location	Discipline	Level
2006–07; 1 victory (1 MS)	18 March 2007	(Russia) Khanty-Mansiysk	15 km mass start	Biathlon World Cup
2007–08; 2 victories (2 Pu)	2 December 2007	(Finland) Kontiolahti	12.5 km pursuit	Biathlon World Cup
2007–08; 2 victories (2 Pu)	15 March 2008	(Norway) Oslo Holmenkollen	12.5 km pursuit	Biathlon World Cup
2009–10; 4 victories (3 Sp, 1 MS)	19 December 2009	(Slovenia) Pokljuka	10 km sprint	Biathlon World Cup
2009–10; 4 victories (3 Sp, 1 MS)	13 March 2010	(Finland) Kontiolahti	10 km sprint	Biathlon World Cup
2009–10; 4 victories (3 Sp, 1 MS)	21 March 2010	(Norway) Oslo Holmenkollen	15 km mass start	Biathlon World Cup
2009–10; 4 victories (3 Sp, 1 MS)	26 March 2010	(Russia) Khanty-Mansiysk	10 km sprint	Biathlon World Cup

*Results are from UIPMB and IBU races which include the Biathlon World Cup, Biathlon World Championships and the Winter Olympic Games.

== Political career ==
Tcherezov was elected as a deputy of the State Council of the Udmurt Republic for the United Russia party in by-elections on 13 September 2020.

On 15 December 2020, Tcherezov was elected chairman of the newly created permanent commission of the State Council of the Udmurt Republic on physical culture, sports, and youth policy.
