= Linda Grubben =

Norwegian biathlete (born 1979)

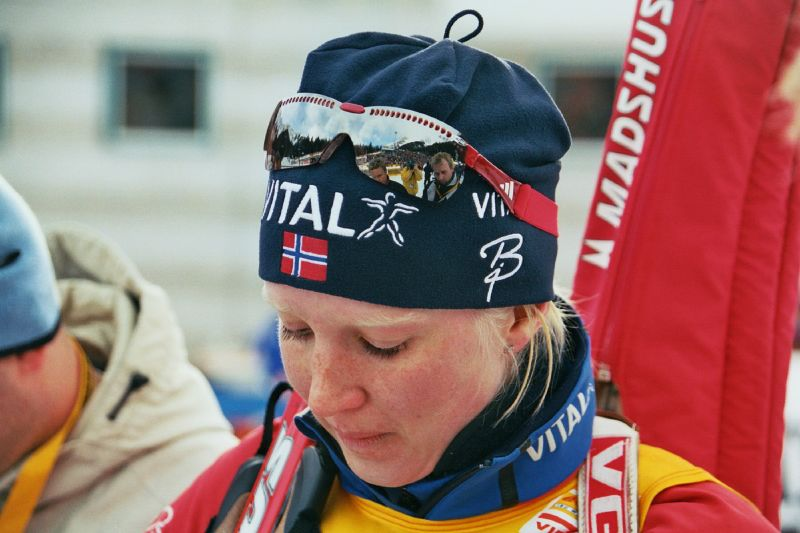
- Grubben in Antholz-Anterselva in 2006.

Personal information
- Full name: Linda Grubben
- Born: Linda Tjørhom; 13 September 1979 (age 46) Stavanger, Norway

Sport

Professional information
- Sport: Biathlon
- World Cup debut: 12 February 2000
- Retired: 11 February 2007

Olympic Games
- Teams: 2 (2002, 2006)
- Medals: 1 (0 gold)

World Championships
- Teams: 7 (2000, 2001, 2002, 2004, 2005, 2006, 2007)
- Medals: 6 (2 gold)

World Cup
- Seasons: 8 (1999/00–2006/07)
- Individual victories: 8
- All victories: 14
- Individual podiums: 22
- All podiums: 40
- Discipline titles: 1: 1 Individual (2002–03)
Medal record
Women's biathlon
Representing Norway
Olympic Games
Silver medal – second place	2002 Salt Lake City	4 × 7.5 km relay
World Championships
Gold medal – first place	2004 Oberhof	4 × 6 km relay
Gold medal – first place	2007 Antholz-Anterselva	15 km individual
Silver medal – second place	2006 Pokljuka	Mixed relay
Silver medal – second place	2007 Antholz-Anterselva	10 km pursuit
Bronze medal – third place	2005 Hochfilzen	15 km individual
Bronze medal – third place	2007 Antholz-Anterselva	4 × 6 km relay
Junior World Championships
Gold medal – first place	1997 Forni Avoltri	3 × 7.5 km relay
Silver medal – second place	1998 Jericho/Valcartier	Sprint
Silver medal – second place	1998 Jericho/Valcartier	Relay
Silver medal – second place	1999 Pokljuka	7.5 km sprint
Silver medal – second place	1999 Pokljuka	10 km pursuit
Bronze medal – third place	1999 Pokljuka	12.5 km individual

Linda Grubben (née Tjørhom; 13 September 1979 in Stavanger) is a retired Norwegian biathlete.

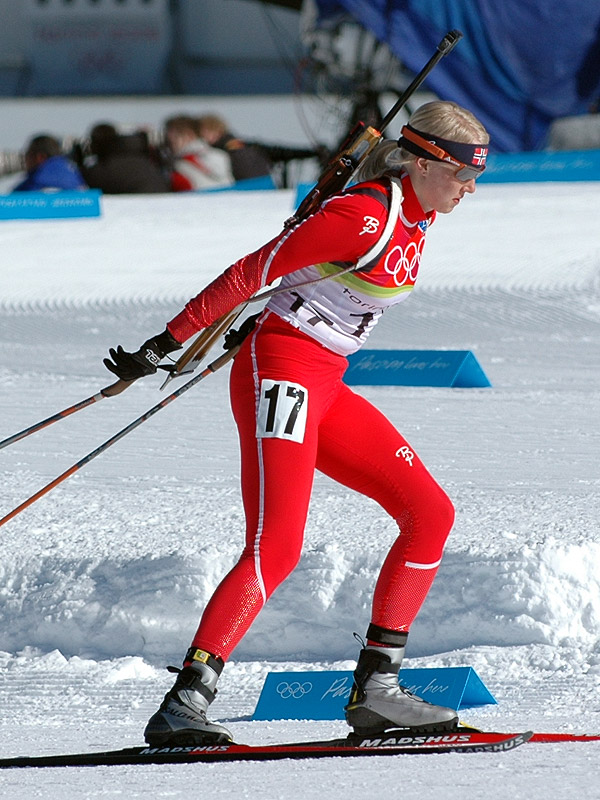
Linda Tjørhom at the 2006 Winter Olympics

She won a silver medal at the 2002 Winter Olympics in the 4 × 7.5 km relay. She won the gold medal in the 4 x 6 km relay at the Biathlon World Championships 2004 in Oberhof, 2004. Individually, she won the bronze medal at the 15 km of the Biathlon World Championship 2005 in Hochfilzen. Grubben won the last race of the 2005-06 Biathlon World Cup in Oslo, capturing the third position in the overall rankings. She accumulated eight World Cup victories in her career. At the World Championships in Antholz-Anterselva, she collected bronze, silver and gold medals. The gold medal was secured by hitting 20 out of 20 possible targets.

On 5 August 2006, she married Norwegian national biathlon coach Roger Grubben, and adopted his last name, Grubben. In December 2007 she gave birth to their first child, a daughter.

After winning her third medal which was a bronze at the 2007 World Championships, she announced her retirement from the sport.
