= Delphyne Peretto =

French biathlete (born 1982)

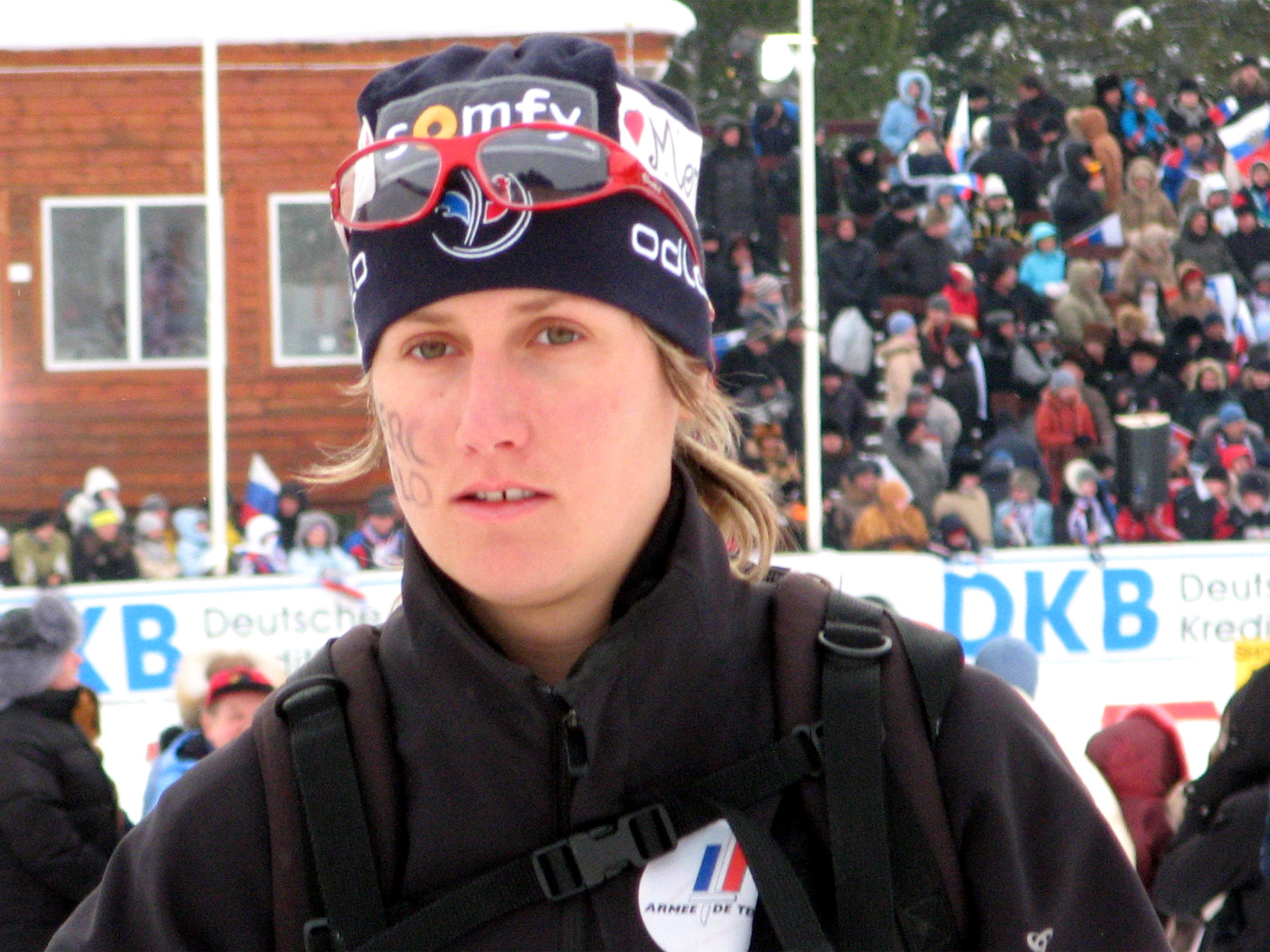

Medal record

Women's biathlon

Representing France

Olympic Games
Bronze medal – third place	2006 Torino	4 × 6 km relay

World Championships
Silver medal – second place	2007 Antholz-Anterselva	4 × 6 km relay
Bronze medal – third place	2008 Östersund	4 × 6 km relay

Delphyne Peretto (born February 9, 1982, in Albertville, Savoie) is a former French biathlete. She was on the bronze-winning relay team in the 2006 Winter Olympics.

Peretto retired at the end of the 2007-08 season.
