= Biathlon World Championships 2006 =

Sports competition in Pokljuka, Slovenia

- Host city: Pokljuka
- Country: Slovenia
- Events: 8
- Opening: 12 March 2006
- Closing: 12 March 2006

The Mixed Relay Biathlon World Championships was held in Pokljuka, Slovenia on March 12, 2006. As for the rules of biathlon in the year of the Winter Olympic Games World Championships being played only in disciplines not included in the Olympic program, therefore the championship consisted only of the mixed relay.

== Mixed ==
- Date / Start Time: Sun March 12, 2006 / 11:00 CET

Event	Gold		Silver		Bronze	
4 × 6 km W+M relay	Russia Anna Bogaliy-Titovets; Sergei Tchepikov; Irina Malgina; Nikolay Kruglov, Jr.	1:16:24.83 (0+0) (0+2) (0+2) (1+3) (0+1) (0+1) (0+1) (0+0)	Norway Linda Grubben; Halvard Hanevold; Tora Berger; Ole Einar Bjørndalen	1:17:18.56 (0+1) (0+1) (0+2) (1+3) (0+2) (2+3) (0+1) (0+3)	France Florence Baverel-Robert; Vincent Defrasne; Sandrine Bailly; Raphaël Poirée	1:18:23.04 (0+1) (0+2) (0+0) (2+3) (0+0) (3+2) (0+1) (0+1)

== Medal table ==
Place	Nation	1st place, gold medalist(s)	2nd place, silver medalist(s)	3rd place, bronze medalist(s)	Total
1	Russia	1	0	0	1
2	Norway	0	1	0	1
3	France	0	0	1	1
