= Vincent Defrasne =

French biathlete (born 1977)

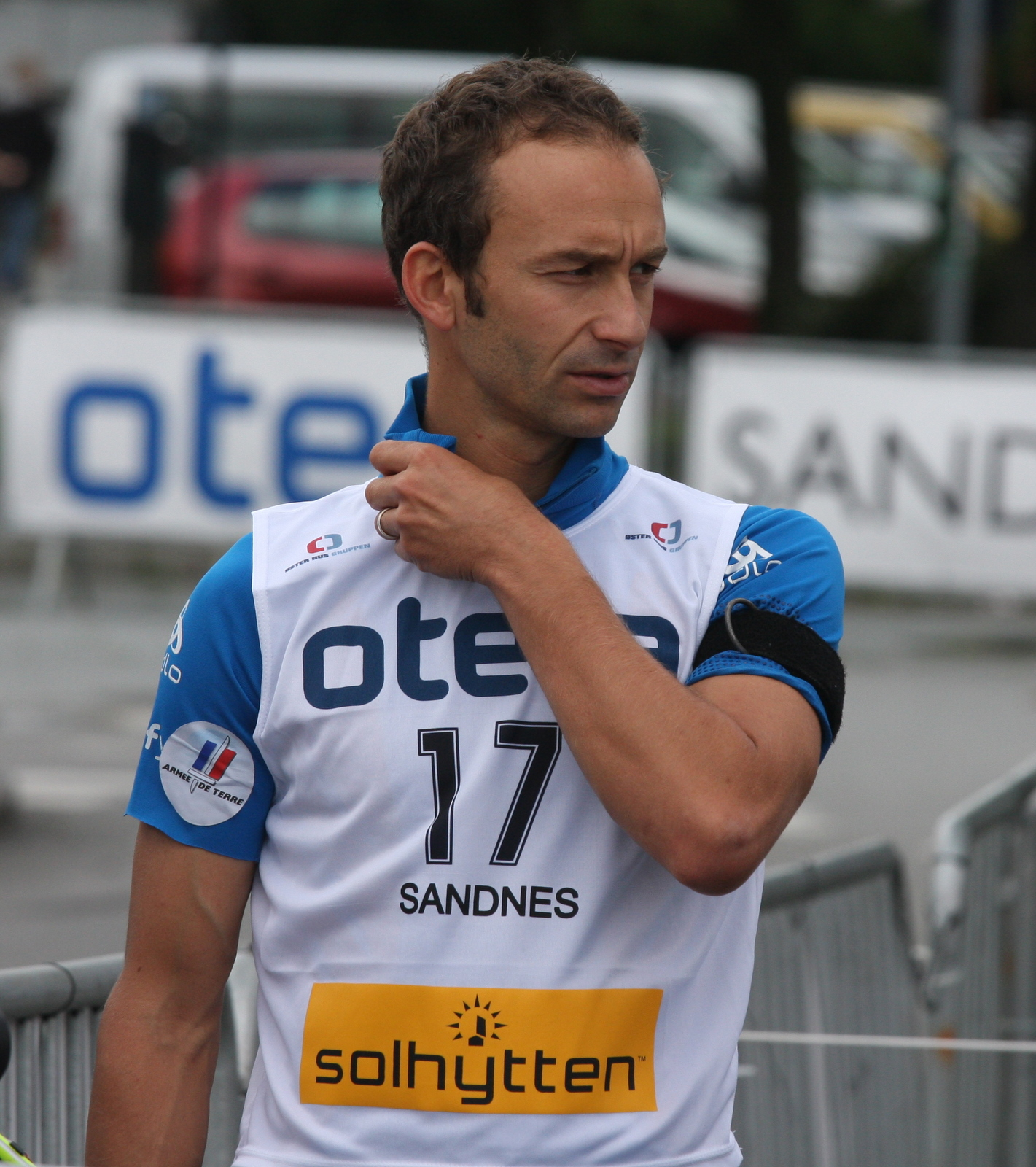
- Defrasne in 2009 in Sandnes.

Personal information
- Full name: Vincent Defrasne
- Born: 9 March 1977 (age 49) Pontarlier, France
- Height: 1.74 m (5 ft 9 in)

Sport

Professional information
- Sport: Biathlon
- Club: EMHM - Pontarlier
- World Cup debut: 8 January 1999

Olympic Games
- Teams: 3 (2002, 2006, 2010)
- Medals: 3 (1 gold)

World Championships
- Teams: 11 (1999, 2000, 2001, 2002, 2003, 2004, 2005, 2006, 2007, 2008, 2009)
- Medals: 6 (2 gold)

World Cup
- Seasons: 12 (1998/99–2009/10)
- Individual victories: 3
- All victories: 7
- Individual podiums: 9
- All podiums: 28
- Discipline titles: 1: 1 Individual (2007–08)
Medal record
Men's biathlon
Representing France
Olympic Games
Gold medal – first place	2006 Turin	12.5 km pursuit
Bronze medal – third place	2002 Salt Lake City	4 × 7.5 km relay
Bronze medal – third place	2006 Turin	4 × 7.5 km relay
World Championships
Gold medal – first place	2001 Pokljuka	4 × 7.5 km relay
Gold medal – first place	2009 Pyeongchang	Mixed relay
Silver medal – second place	2007 Antholz-Anterselva	Mixed relay
Bronze medal – third place	2004 Oberhof	4 × 7.5 km relay
Bronze medal – third place	2006 Pokljuka	Mixed relay
Bronze medal – third place	2007 Antholz-Anterselva	12.5 km pursuit

Vincent Defrasne (born 9 March 1977) is a former French biathlete. He won a gold medal in the 12.5 km pursuit at the 2006 Winter Olympics in Turin and a bronze medal in the 2002 Winter Olympics in Salt Lake City.

He was also a member of the winning Biathlon World Championship relay team in 2001, and the 2004 team which won bronze. At the Biathlon World Championship 2007 in Antholz, Defrasne earned a bronze medal, in the 12.5 km pursuit and a silver medal in the Mixed Relay event. In 2009 at the World Championships in Pyeongchang, Defrasne was part of the victorious mixed relay team.

Defrasne served as the flagbearer for France at the 2010 Winter Olympics.

He retired from the sport after the 2009–10 season.

== Biathlon results ==
All results are sourced from the International Biathlon Union.

=== Olympic Games ===
3 medals (1 gold, 2 bronze)

Event	Individual	Sprint	Pursuit	Mass start	Relay
(United States) 2002 Salt Lake City	37th	21st	18th	—N/a	Bronze
(Italy) 2006 Turin	34th	4th	Gold	11th	Bronze
(Canada) 2010 Vancouver	26th	53rd	22nd	—	6th

*Mass start was added as an event in 2006.

=== World Championships ===
6 medals (2 gold, 1 silver, 3 bronze)

Event	Individual	Sprint	Pursuit	Mass start	Relay	Mixed relay
(Finland) 1999 Kontiolahti	—	57th	51st	—	12th	—N/a
(Norway) 2000 Oslo Holmenkollen	54th	25th	32nd	—	10th	—N/a
(Slovenia) 2001 Pokljuka	48th	10th	7th	12th	Gold	—N/a
(Norway) 2002 Oslo Holmenkollen	—N/a	—N/a	—N/a	20th	—N/a	—N/a
(Russia) 2003 Khanty-Mansiysk	4th	17th	DNF	18th	13th	—N/a
(Germany) 2004 Oberhof	20th	6th	4th	6th	Bronze	—N/a
(Austria) 2005 Hochfilzen	11th	10th	7th	16th	5th	6th
(Slovenia) 2006 Pokljuka	—N/a	—N/a	—N/a	—N/a	—N/a	Bronze
(Italy) 2007 Antholz-Anterselva	—	16th	Bronze	11th	10th	Silver
(Sweden) 2008 Östersund	12th	54th	22nd	7th	5th	—
(South Korea) 2009 Pyeongchang	21st	41st	40th	—	4th	Gold

*During Olympic seasons competitions are only held for those events not included in the Olympic program.
**The mixed relay was added as an event in 2005.

=== Individual victories ===
3 victories (1 In, 1 Sp, 1 Pu)

Season	Date	Location	Discipline	Level
2005–06; 2 victories (1 Sp, 1 Pu)	7 January 2006	(Germany) Oberhof	10 km sprint	Biathlon World Cup
2005–06; 2 victories (1 Sp, 1 Pu)	18 February 2006	(Italy) Sansicario	12.5 km pursuit	Winter Olympic Games
2007–08; 1 victory (1 In)	29 November 2007	(Finland) Kontiolahti	20 km individual	Biathlon World Cup

*Results are from UIPMB and IBU races which include the Biathlon World Cup, Biathlon World Championships and the Winter Olympic Games.

Olympic Games
Preceded by Bruno Mingeon	Flagbearer for France; Vancouver 2010	Succeeded by Jason Lamy-Chappuis
