= Biathlon World Championships 2008 =

Sports competition in Östersund, Sweden

- Host city: Östersund
- Country: Sweden
- Events: 11
- Opening: 8 February 2008
- Closing: 17 February 2008
- Main venue: Östersund Ski Stadium

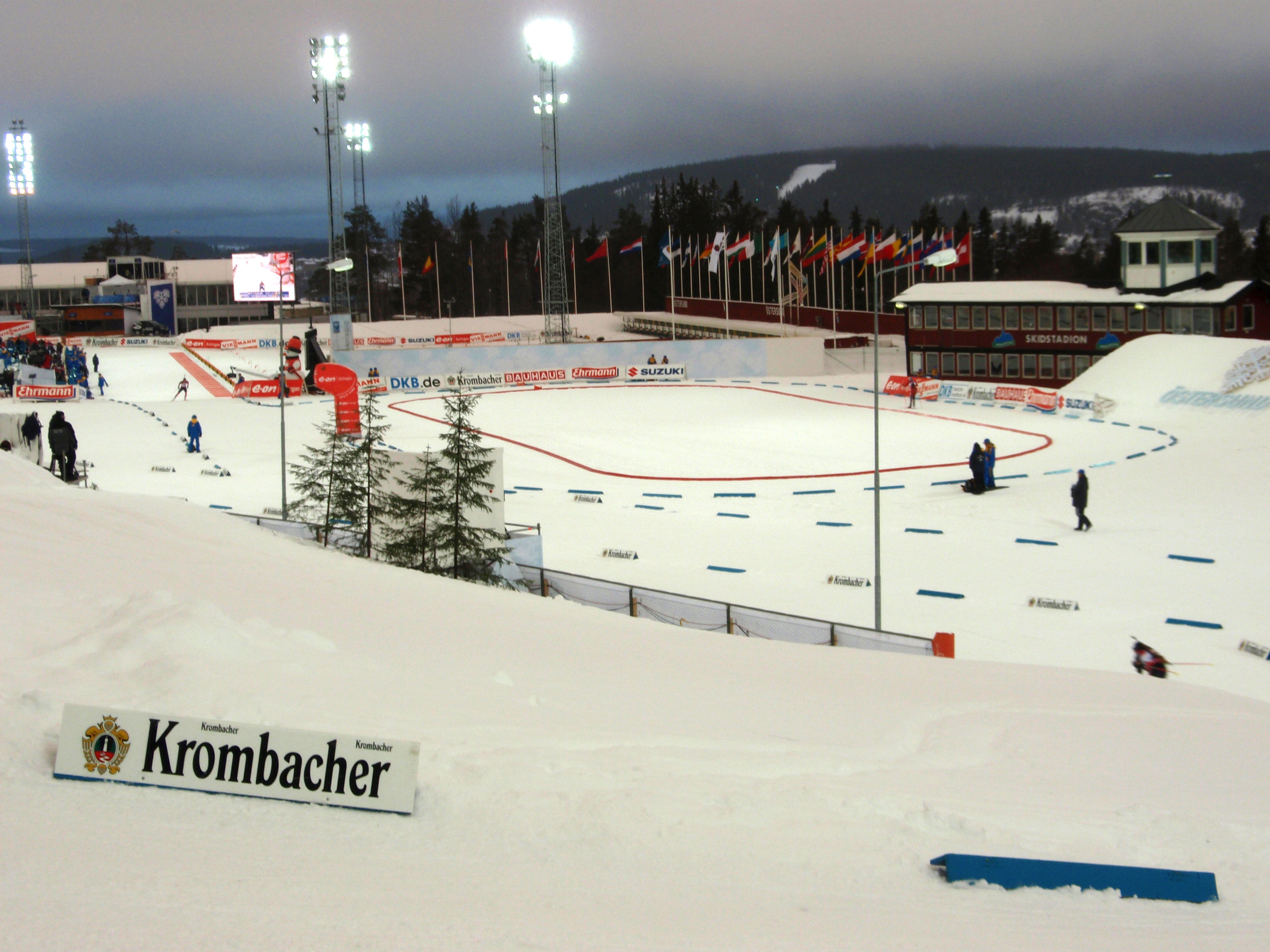
Östersund Ski Stadium

The 42nd Biathlon World Championships were held in Östersund, Sweden from 8 to 17 February 2008. It was the second time Östersund was hosting the Biathlon World Championships, the first being in 1970. It was also 50 years after the first Biathlon World Championships, which were held 1958 in Saalfelden, Austria.

There were a total of 11 competitions: sprint, pursuit, individual, mass start, and relay races for men and women, and the relatively new mixed relay. The championships were dominated by the German, Norwegian, and Russian teams, which would win every competition and 28 of the 33 available medals.

== Schedule ==
| Date | Event |
|---|---|
| 9 February | Women's 7.5 km sprint |
| 9 February | Men's 10 km sprint |
| 10 February | Women's 10 km pursuit |
| 10 February | Men's 7.5 km pursuit |
| 12 February | 2 × 6 km + 2 × 7.5 km mixed relay |
| 14 February | Women's 15 km individual |
| 14 February | Men's 20 km individual |
| 16 February | Men's 4 × 7.5 km relay |
| 16 February | Women's 12.5 km mass start |
| 17 February | Men's 15 km mass start |
| 17 February | Women's 4 × 6 km relay |

== Medal winners ==
=== Men ===
| Event | Gold | | Silver | | Bronze | |
|---|---|---|---|---|---|---|
| 10 km sprint | Maxim Tchoudov; Russia | 22:25.4 (0+0) | Halvard Hanevold; Norway | 22:45.2 (0+0) | Ole Einar Bjørndalen; Norway | 22:55.4 (0+2) |
| 12.5 km pursuit | Ole Einar Bjørndalen; Norway | 31:04.5 (0+1+1+0) | Maxim Tchoudov; Russia | 31:14.6 (2+0+2+0) | Alexander Wolf; Germany | 31:47.3 (0+0+1+0) |
| 20 km individual | Emil Hegle Svendsen; Norway | 51:51.9 (0+1+0+0) | Ole Einar Bjørndalen; Norway | 52:23.3 (1+1+0+0) | Maxim Maksimov; Russia | 52:26.7 (0+0+0+0) |
| 4 × 7.5 km relay | Russia Ivan Tcherezov; Nikolay Kruglov; Dmitry Yaroshenko; Maxim Tchoudov | 1:21:00.7 (0+0) (0+1) (0+0) (0+2) (0+0) (0+1) (0+0) (0+1) | Norway Emil Hegle Svendsen; Rune Brattsveen; Halvard Hanevold; Ole Einar Bjørndalen | 1:21:49.9 (0+0) (0+1) (0+0) (0+3) (0+1) (0+2) (0+0) (0+0) | Germany Michael Rösch; Alexander Wolf; Andreas Birnbacher; Michael Greis | 1:22:43.2 (0+0) (1+3) (0+0) (0+1) (0+2) (1+3) (0+3) (0+2) |
| 15 km mass start | Emil Hegle Svendsen; Norway | 36:12.6 (1+0+0+0) | Ole Einar Bjørndalen; Norway | 36:13.0 (0+0+1+0) | Maxim Tchoudov; Russia | 36:37.5 (0+1+2+0) |

=== Women ===
| Event | Gold | | Silver | | Bronze | |
|---|---|---|---|---|---|---|
| 7.5 km sprint | Andrea Henkel; Germany | 19:43.1 (0+0) | Albina Akhatova; Russia | 19:55.8 (0+0) | Oksana Khvostenko; Ukraine | 20:06.3 (0+0) |
| 10 km pursuit | Andrea Henkel; Germany | 28:56.0 (0+0+0+0) | Ekaterina Iourieva; Russia | 29:16.5 (0+0+0+0) | Albina Akhatova; Russia | 29:34.5 (0+0+0+0) |
| 15 km individual | Ekaterina Iourieva; Russia | 44:23.8 (0+0+0+0) | Martina Glagow; Germany | 45:37.1 (1+0+0+0) | Oksana Khvostenko; Ukraine | 46:48.2 (0+0+1+0) |
| 4 × 6 km relay | Germany Martina Glagow; Andrea Henkel; Magdalena Neuner; Kati Wilhelm | 1:10:12.6 (0+0) (0+0) (0+0) (0+0) (0+2) (1+3) (0+2) (0+2) | Ukraine Oksana Yakovleva; Vita Semerenko; Valentyna Semerenko; Oksana Khvostenko | 1:10:43.5 (0+0) (0+0) (0+0) (0+2) (0+0) (0+2) (0+0) (0+0) | France Delphyne Peretto; Marie-Laure Brunet; Sylvie Becaert; Sandrine Bailly | 1:11:48.3 (0+1) (0+1) (0+0) (1+3) (0+1) (1+3) (0+2) (0+2) |
| 12.5 km mass start | Magdalena Neuner; Germany | 39:36.5 (0+0+2+2) | Tora Berger; Norway | 39:39.5 (1+0+0+0) | Ekaterina Iourieva; Russia | 40:06.0 (1+0+1+0) |

=== Mixed ===
| Event | Gold | | Silver | | Bronze | |
|---|---|---|---|---|---|---|
| 2 × 6 + 2 × 7.5 km mixed relay | Germany Sabrina Buchholz; Magdalena Neuner; Andreas Birnbacher; Michael Greis | 1:12:20.5 (0+0) (0+0) (0+0) (0+2) (0+1) (0+2) (0+0) (0+1) | Belarus Liudmila Kalinchik; Darya Domracheva; Rustam Valiullin; Sergey Novikov | 1:13:13.1 (0+0) (0+1) (0+0) (0+1) (0+0) (0+0) (0+0) (0+2) | Russia Svetlana Sleptsova; Oksana Neupokoeva; Nikolay Kruglov; Dmitry Yaroshenko | 1:13:23.4 (0+0) (0+0) (0+0) (0+2) (1+3) (0+2) (0+0) (0+2) |

== Medal summary ==
| Rank | Nation | Gold | Silver | Bronze | Total |
|---|---|---|---|---|---|
| 1 | Germany (GER) | 5 | 1 | 2 | 8 |
| 2 | Norway (NOR) | 3 | 5 | 1 | 9 |
| 3 | Russia (RUS) | 3 | 3 | 5 | 11 |
| 4 | Ukraine (UKR) | 0 | 1 | 2 | 3 |
| 5 | Belarus (BLR) | 0 | 1 | 0 | 1 |
| 6 | France (FRA) | 0 | 0 | 1 | 1 |
| Totals (6 entries) | | 11 | 11 | 11 | 33 |
