= Nikolay Kruglov Jr. =

Russian biathlete

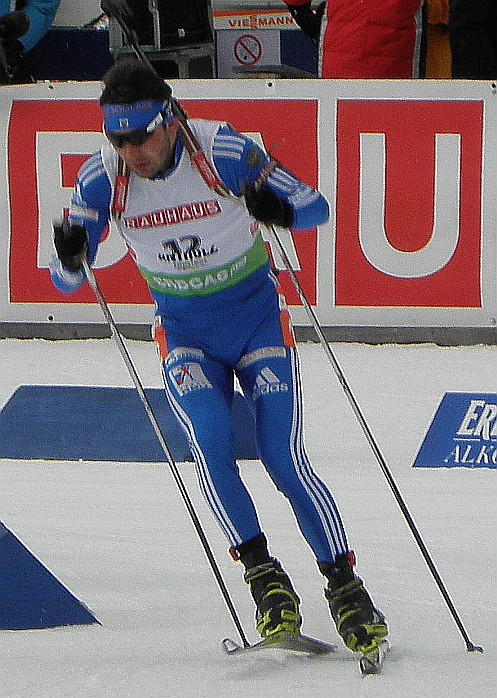

Personal information
- Full name: Nikolay Nikolayevich Kruglov
- Born: 8 April 1981 (age 45) Gorky, RSFSR, Soviet Union
- Height: 1.80 m (5 ft 11 in)

Sport

Professional information
- Sport: Biathlon
- Club: Dinamo
- World Cup debut: 24 January 2002
- Retired: 26 March 2010

Olympic Games
- Teams: 2 (2006, 2010)
- Medals: 1 (0 gold)

World Championships
- Teams: 7 (2003, 2004, 2005, 2006, 2007, 2008, 2009)
- Medals: 5 (4 gold)

World Cup
- Seasons: 9 (2001/02–2009/10)
- Individual victories: 3
- All victories: 10
- Individual podiums: 14
- All podiums: 37
Medal record
Men's biathlon
Representing Russia
Olympic Games
| Silver medal – second place | 2006 Turin | 4 × 7.5 km relay |
World Championships
| Gold medal – first place | 2005 Khanty-Mansiysk | Mixed relay |
| Gold medal – first place | 2006 Pokljuka | Mixed relay |
| Gold medal – first place | 2007 Antholz-Anterselva | 4 × 7.5 km relay |
| Gold medal – first place | 2008 Östersund | 4 × 7.5 km relay |
| Silver medal – second place | 2005 Hochfilzen | 4 × 7.5 km relay |
| Bronze medal – third place | 2008 Östersund | Mixed relay |
Junior World Championships
| Silver medal – second place | 2000 Hochfilzen | 12.5 km pursuit |
| Silver medal – second place | 2000 Hochfilzen | 4 × 7.5 km relay |
| Silver medal – second place | 2001 Khanty-Mansiysk | 10 km sprint |
| Silver medal – second place | 2001 Khanty-Mansiysk | 12.5 km pursuit |
| Silver medal – second place | 2001 Khanty-Mansiysk | 4 × 7.5 km relay |

Nikolay Nikolayevich Kruglov (Russian: Никола́й Никола́евич Кругло́в; born 8 April 1981) is a former Russian biathlete. His father, Nikolay Kruglov, was also a biathlete. Kruglov Jr. has won a couple of medals with the Russian relay team. He is a two-time World Champion in the men's relay and a two-time World Champion in mixed relay. Also he won silver medals at the 2005 World Championships and the 2006 Olympics.

Kruglov retired from the sport after the 2009–10 season.

== Biathlon results ==
All results are sourced from the International Biathlon Union.

=== Olympic Games ===
1 medal (1 silver)

| Event | Individual | Sprint | Pursuit | Mass start | Relay |
|---|---|---|---|---|---|
| (Italy) 2006 Turin | — | 21st | 11th | 21st | Silver |
| (Canada) 2010 Vancouver | 11th | — | — | — | — |

=== World Championships ===
6 medals (4 gold, 1 silver, 1 bronze)

| Event | Individual | Sprint | Pursuit | Mass start | Relay | Mixed relay |
|---|---|---|---|---|---|---|
| (Russia) 2003 Khanty-Mansiysk | 39th | — | — | — | — | —N/a |
| (Germany) 2004 Oberhof | — | 12th | 14th | 17th | — | —N/a |
| (Austria) 2005 Hochfilzen | 35th | 5th | 4th | 4th | Silver | Gold |
| (Slovenia) 2006 Pokljuka | —N/a | —N/a | —N/a | —N/a | —N/a | Gold |
| (Italy) 2007 Antholz-Anterselva | 5th | 12th | 16th | 12th | Gold | — |
| (Sweden) 2008 Östersund | — | 26th | 25th | — | Gold | Bronze |
| (South Korea) 2009 Pyeongchang | — | 66th | — | — | — | — |

*During Olympic seasons competitions are only held for those events not included in the Olympic program.
**The mixed relay was added as an event in 2005.

=== Individual victories ===
3 victories (1 Sp, 2 Pu)

| Season | Date | Location | Discipline | Level |
|---|---|---|---|---|
| 2004–05; 1 victory (1 Pu) | 18 February 2005 | (Slovenia) Pokljuka | 12.5 km pursuit | Biathlon World Cup |
| 2006–07; 2 victories (1 Sp, 1 Pu) | 6 January 2007 | (Germany) Oberhof | 10 km sprint | Biathlon World Cup |
| 2006–07; 2 victories (1 Sp, 1 Pu) | 7 January 2007 | (Germany) Oberhof | 12.5 km pursuit | Biathlon World Cup |

*Results are from UIPMB and IBU races which include the Biathlon World Cup, Biathlon World Championships and the Winter Olympic Games.
