= Biathlon World Championships 2007 =

Sports competition in Antholz/Anterselva, Italy

- Host city: Antholz/Anterselva
- Country: Italy
- Events: 11
- Opening: 2 February 2007
- Closing: 11 February 2007

The 41st Biathlon World Championships were held in 2007 for the fourth time in Antholz/Anterselva, Italy from February 2 to February 11.

== Schedule ==
Date	Event
3 February	Men's 10 km sprint
3 February	Women's 7.5 km sprint
4 February	Men's 12.5 km pursuit
4 February	Women's 10 km pursuit
6 February	Men's 20 km individual
7 February	Women's 15 km individual
8 February	2 × 6 km + 2 × 7.5 km relay
10 February	Men's 4 × 7.5 km relay
10 February	Women's 12.5 km mass start
11 February	Women's 4 × 6 km relay
11 February	Men's 15 km mass start

== Medal winners ==
=== Men ===
Event	Gold		Silver		Bronze	
10 km sprint	Ole Einar Bjørndalen; Norway	26:18.8 (0+1)	Michal Šlesingr; Czech Republic	26:23.6 (0+0)	Andriy Deryzemlya; Ukraine	26:44.6 (0+0)
12.5 km pursuit	Ole Einar Bjørndalen; Norway	32:21.2 (1+0+1+0)	Maxim Tchoudov; Russia	33:31.0 (1+0+2+0)	Vincent Defrasne; France	33:31.1 (0+0+1+0)
20 km individual	Raphaël Poirée; France	56:14.6 (0+0+0+0)	Michael Greis; Germany	56:41.4 (0+1+0+1)	Michal Šlesingr; Czech Republic	56:52.0 (0+2+0+0)
4 × 7.5 km relay	Russia Ivan Tcherezov; Maxim Tchoudov; Dmitry Yaroshenko; Nikolay Kruglov	1:14:36.1 (0+0) (0+0) (0+0) (0+1) (0+0) (0+0) (0+0) (0+0)	Norway Halvard Hanevold; Lars Berger; Frode Andresen; Ole Einar Bjørndalen	1:15:36.6 (0+2) (0+1) (0+2) (0+2) (0+0) (1+3) (0+0) (0+1)	Germany Ricco Groß; Michael Rösch; Sven Fischer; Michael Greis	1:16:08.6 (0+0) (1+3) (0+1) (1+3) (0+1) (0+2) (0+0) (0+3)
15 km mass start	Michael Greis; Germany	37:52.1 (0+0+2+0)	Andreas Birnbacher; Germany	38:07.5 (0+0+0+0)	Raphaël Poirée; France	38:20.2 (1+0+0+0)

=== Women ===
Event	Gold		Silver		Bronze	
7.5 km sprint	Magdalena Neuner; Germany	22:46.9 (1+1)	Anna Carin Olofsson; Sweden	22:49.2 (1+1)	Natalia Guseva; Russia	23:06.5 (0+1)
10 km pursuit	Magdalena Neuner; Germany	33:01.6 (1+0+1+2)	Linda Grubben; Norway	33:08.7 (0+1+0+0)	Anna Carin Olofsson; Sweden	33:09.2 (2+0+1+2)
15 km individual	Linda Grubben; Norway	46:24.3 (0+0+0+0)	Florence Baverel-Robert; France	47:30.8 (0+0+0+0)	Martina Glagow; Germany	47:59.9 (1+0+0+0)
4 × 6 km relay	Germany Martina Glagow; Andrea Henkel; Magdalena Neuner; Kati Wilhelm	1:14:19.1 (0+0) (0+1) (0+2) (0+1) (0+0) (0+3) (0+0) (0+0)	France Florence Baverel-Robert; Delphyne Peretto; Sylvie Becaert; Sandrine Bailly	1:15:26.9 (0+1) (0+2) (0+1) (1+3) (0+0) (0+0) (0+0) (0+0)	Norway Tora Berger; Ann Kristin Flatland; Jori Mørkve; Linda Grubben	1:15:48.8 (0+0) (1+3) (0+0) (0+2) (0+0) (0+0) (0+0) (0+1)
12.5 km mass start	Andrea Henkel; Germany	37:13.1 (1+0+1+0)	Martina Glagow; Germany	37:17.7 (1+0+0+0)	Kati Wilhelm; Germany	37:23.7 (0+1+1+0)

=== Mixed ===
Event	Gold		Silver		Bronze	
2 × 6 + 2 × 7.5 km W+M relay	Sweden Helena Jonsson; Anna Carin Olofsson; Björn Ferry; Carl Johan Bergman	1:20:04.7 (0+1) (0+1) (0+1) (0+2) (0+2) (0+3) (0+2) (0+1)	France Florence Baverel-Robert; Sandrine Bailly; Vincent Defrasne; Raphaël Poirée	1:20:32.3 (0+0) (0+0) (0+1) (0+1) (0+0) (0+0) (0+0) (0+0)	Norway Tora Berger; Jori Mørkve; Emil Hegle Svendsen; Frode Andresen	1:20:41.4 (0+1) (0+1) (0+0) (0+1) (0+1) (0+1) (0+3) (0+3)

== Medal summary ==
Rank	Nation	Gold	Silver	Bronze	Total
1	Germany (GER)	5	3	3	11
2	Norway (NOR)	3	2	2	7
3	France (FRA)	1	3	2	6
4	Russia (RUS)	1	1	1	3
4	Sweden (SWE)	1	1	1	3
6	Czech Republic (CZE)	0	1	1	2
7	Ukraine (UKR)	0	0	1	1
Totals (7 entries)		11	11	11	33
