= Biathlon European Championships 2006 =

International biathlon competition

The 13th Biathlon European Championships were held in Langdorf, Germany, from February 28 to March 5, 2006.

There were total of 16 competitions held: sprint, pursuit, individual and relay both for U26 and U21.

== Results ==
=== U26 ===
==== Men's ====
Competition	1st	2nd	3rd
Men's 10 km sprint	(Czech Republic) Jaroslav Soukup	(Belarus) Sergey Novikov	(Germany) Carsten Pump
Men's 12.5 km pursuit	(Belarus) Sergey Novikov	(Latvia) Edgars Piksons	(Ukraine) Vyacheslav Derkach
Men's 20 km individual	(Norway) Alexander Os	(France) Lois Habert	(Belarus) Vladimir Drachev
Men's 4 × 7.5 km relay	(Belarus) Belarus; Sergey Novikov; Vladimir Drachev; Rustam Valiullin; Oleg Ryzhenkov	(Ukraine) Ukraine; Vyacheslav Derkach; Oleksandr Bilanenko; Andriy Deryzemlya; Ruslan Lysenko	(Norway) Norway; Haakon Andersen; Alexander Os; Hans Martin Gjedrem; Jon Christian Svaland

==== Women's ====
Competition	1st	2nd	3rd
Women's 7.5 km sprint	(Ukraine) Nina Lemesh	(Russia) Olga Anisimova	(Bulgaria) Ekaterina Dafovska
Women's 10 km pursuit	(Belarus) Natalya Sokolova	(Russia) Olga Anisimova	(Russia) Irina Malgina
Women's 15 km individual	(Bulgaria) Pavlina Filipova	(Slovakia) Martina Halinárová	(Slovakia) Soňa Mihoková
Women's 4 × 6 km relay	(Belarus) Belarus; Ekaterina Ivanova; Olga Nazarova; Lyudmila Ananko; Olena Zubrilova	(Bulgaria) Bulgaria; Pavlina Filipova; Irina Nikulchina; Nina Klenovska; Ekaterina Dafovska	(Germany) Germany; Jenny Adler; Magdalena Neuner; Katja Beer; Sabrina Buchholz

=== U21 ===
==== Men's ====
Competition	1st	2nd	3rd
Men's 10 km sprint	(Russia) Vladimir Semakov	(France) Vincent Jay	(Slovenia) Klemen Bauer
Men's 12.5 km pursuit	(Russia) Vladimir Semakov	(Slovenia) Klemen Bauer	(France) Vincent Jay
Men's 20 km individual	(Russia) Pavel Borisov	(Germany) Daniel Böhm	(Russia) Viktor Vasiliev
Men's 4 × 7.5 km relay	(Russia) Russia; Pavel Borisov; Vladimir Semakov; Viktor Vasiliev; Evgeny Ustyugov	(Germany) Germany; Norman Jahn; Daniel Böhm; Sebastian Berthold; Christoph Stephan	(France) France; Alexis Bœuf; Arnaud Langel; Jean-Guillaume Béatrix; Vincent Jay

==== Women's ====
Competition	1st	2nd	3rd
Women's 7.5 km sprint	(Ukraine) Valj Semerenko	(France) Pauline Macabies	(Sweden) Johanna Holma
Women's 10 km pursuit	(Finland) Mari Laukkanen	(Ukraine) Valj Semerenko	(France) Pauline Macabies
Women's 15 km individual	(France) Pauline Macabies	(Sweden) Johanna Holma	(Ukraine) Liudmyla Zhyber
Women's 3 × 6 km relay	(Germany) Germany; Tina Bachmann; Susann König; Carolin Hennecke	(Russia) Russia; Tatiana Zievachina; Anna Kunaeva; Ekaterina Shumilova	(France) France; Marion Blondeau; Marie Dorin; Pauline Macabies

== Medal table ==
№	Country	Gold	Silver	Bronze	Total
1	Russia	4	3	2	9
2	Belarus	4	1	1	6
3	Ukraine	2	2	2	6
4	France	1	3	4	8
5	Germany	1	2	2	5
6	Bulgaria	1	1	1	3
7	Norway	1		1	2
8	Czech Republic	1			1
8	Finland	1			1
10	Slovakia		2	2	4
11	Sweden		1	1	2
12	Latvia			1	1
