= Biathlon European Championships 2003 =

International biathlon competition

The 10th Biathlon European Championships were held in Forni Avoltri, Italy, from February 26 to March 2, 2003.

There were total of 16 competitions held: sprint, pursuit, individual and relay both for U26 and U21.

== Results ==
=== U26 ===
==== Men's ====
Competition	1st	2nd	3rd
Men's 10 km sprint	(Ukraine) Oleksiy Korobeinikov	(Belarus) Vladimir Drachev	(Germany) Carsten Pump
Men's 12.5 km pursuit	(Ukraine) Andriy Deryzemlia	(Norway) Alexander Os	(Belarus) Vladimir Drachev
Men's 20 km individual	(Ukraine) Olexander Bilanenko	(Belarus) Alexei Aidarov	(Germany) Marco Morgenstern
Men's 4 × 7.5 km relay	(Germany) Germany; Daniel Graf; Carsten Pump; Jörn Wollschläger; Marco Morgenstern	(Russia) Russia; Vitaliy Chernyshov; Sergei Kovalyov; Filip Shulman; Ivan Cherezov	(Belarus) Belarus; Alexei Aidarov; Vladimir Drachev; Rustam Valiullin; Oleg Ryzhenkov

==== Women's ====
Competition	1st	2nd	3rd
Women's 7.5 km sprint	(Slovakia) Martina Halinárová	(Russia) Svetlana Ishmuratova	(Belarus) Ekaterina Ivanova
Women's 10 km pursuit	(Belarus) Ekaterina Ivanova	(Belarus) Olena Zubrilova	(Germany) Ina Menzel
Women's 15 km individual	(Russia) Elena Khrustaleva	(Ukraine) Olena Petrova	(Germany) Ina Menzel
Women's 4 × 6 km relay	(Russia) Russia; Elena Khrustaleva; Anna Bogaliy; Yuliya Makarova; Irina Malgina	(Czech Republic) Czech Republic; Lenka Faltusová; Zdeňka Vejnarová; Irena Česneková; Kateřina Holubcová	(Belarus) Belarus; Lilia Efremova; Olga Nazarova; Ekaterina Ivanova; Olena Zubrilova

=== U21 ===
==== Men's ====
Competition	1st	2nd	3rd
Men's 10 km sprint	(Austria) Simon Eder	(Slovakia) Miroslav Matiaško	(Russia) Maxim Chudov
Men's 12.5 km pursuit	(Russia) Maxim Chudov	(Austria) Simon Eder	(Russia) Oleg Milovanov
Men's 20 km individual	(Czech Republic) Ondřej Moravec	(Czech Republic) Michal Šlesingr	(Belarus) Vitaliy Pertsev
Men's 4 × 7.5 km relay	(Czech Republic) Czech Republic; Martin Balatka; Ondřej Moravec; Jaroslav Soukup; Michal Šlesingr	(Belarus) Belarus; Sergei Dashkevich; Vladimir Miklashevski; Aliaksandr Mytnik; Vitaliy Pertsev	(Russia) Russia; Nikolai Kozlov; Oleg Milovanov; Andrei Makoveev; Maxim Chudov

==== Women's ====
Competition	1st	2nd	3rd
Women's 7.5 km sprint	(Russia) Natalia Burdyga	(Belarus) Lyudmila Ananko	(France) Pauline Jacquin
Women's 10 km pursuit	(Russia) Natalia Burdyga	(Belarus) Lyudmila Ananko	(Russia) Uliana Denisova
Women's 15 km individual	(Czech Republic) Magda Rezlerová	(France) Pauline Jacquin	(France) Delphyne Peretto
Women's 3 × 6 km relay	(Russia) Russia; Yana Romanova; Uliana Denisova; Natalia Burdyga	(Belarus) Belarus; Tatsiana Shyntar; Liudmila Kalinchik; Lyudmila Ananko	(Czech Republic) Czech Republic; Klara Moravcová; Michaela Stranská; Magda Rezlerová

== Medal table ==
№	Country	Gold	Silver	Bronze	Total
1	Russia	6	2	4	12
2	Czech Republic	3	2	1	6
3	Ukraine	3	1		4
4	Belarus	1	7	5	13
5	Austria	1	1		2
5	Slovakia	1	1		2
7	Germany	1		4	5
8	France		1	2	3
9	Norway		1		1
