= Biathlon European Championships 2004 =

International Sporting Competition

The 11th Biathlon European Championships were held in Minsk, Belarus, from February 18 to February 22, 2004.

There were total of 16 competitions held: sprint, pursuit, individual and relay both for U26 and U21.

== Results ==
=== U26 ===
==== Men's ====
Competition	1st	2nd	3rd
Men's 10 km sprint	(Belarus) Alexandr Syman	(Poland) Tomasz Sikora	(Belarus) Vladimir Drachev
Men's 12.5 km pursuit	(Poland) Tomasz Sikora	(Norway) Alexander Os	(Russia) Yevgeni Trebushenko
Men's 20 km individual	(Poland) Tomasz Sikora	(Russia) Dmitri Yaroshenko	(Russia) Aleksei Churin
Men's 4 × 7.5 km relay	(Germany) Germany; Michael Rösch; Jörn Wollschläger; Carsten Heymann; Daniel Graf	(Norway) Norway; Anstein Mykland; Alexander Os; Dag Bjørndalen; Tor Halvor Bjørnstad	(Poland) Poland; Michał Piecha; Wiesław Ziemianin; Grzegorz Bodziana; Tomasz Sikora

==== Women's ====
Competition	1st	2nd	3rd
Women's 7.5 km sprint	(Belarus) Olena Zubrilova	(Ukraine) Olena Petrova	(Russia) Irina Malgina
Women's 10 km pursuit	(Ukraine) Olena Petrova	(Belarus) Ekaterina Ivanova	(Belarus) Olena Zubrilova
Women's 15 km individual	(Bulgaria) Ekaterina Dafovska	(Belarus) Olena Zubrilova	(Bulgaria) Pavlina Filipova
Women's 4 × 6 km relay	(Russia) Russia; Olga Anisimova; Svetlana Chernousova; Natalya Sokolova; Irina Malgina	(Belarus) Belarus; Ekaterina Ivanova; Lyudmila Ananko; Olga Nazarova; Olena Zubrilova	(Germany) Germany; Katharina Echter; Ina Menzel; Romy Beer; Sabrina Buchholz

=== U21 ===
==== Men's ====
Competition	1st	2nd	3rd
Men's 10 km sprint	(Czech Republic) Ondřej Moravec	(Russia) Vladimir Shemelov	(Belarus) Yuri Sholkavich
Men's 12.5 km pursuit	(Czech Republic) Ondřej Moravec	(Russia) Aleksandr Kudrashov	(Russia) Vladimir Shemelov
Men's 20 km individual	(Slovakia) Matej Kazár	(Slovenia) Klemen Bauer	(Ukraine) Oleh Berezhnyi
Men's 4 × 7.5 km relay	(Belarus) Belarus; Andrei Slavnikov; Yuri Sholkavich; Aliaksandr Mytnik; Vladimir Miklashevski	(Ukraine) Ukraine; Ihor Yashchenko; Serhiy Sednev; Oleksandr Kolos; Oleh Berezhnyi	(Slovenia) Slovenia; Peter Dokl; Klemen Bauer; Andraž Šemrov; Gregor Brvar

==== Women's ====
Competition	1st	2nd	3rd
Women's 7.5 km sprint	(Russia) Uliana Denisova	(Poland) Krystyna Pałka	(Czech Republic) Tereza Hlavsová
Women's 10 km pursuit	(Poland) Krystyna Pałka	(Russia) Anastasiya Kuzmina	(Russia) Uliana Denisova
Women's 15 km individual	(Russia) Yelena Davgul	(Russia) Natalia Burdyga	(Romania) Alexandra Stoian
Women's 3 × 6 km relay	(Russia) Russia; Yelena Davgul; Anastasiya Kuzmina; Natalia Burdyga	(Poland) Poland; Paulina Bobak; Angelika Szrubianiec; Magdalena Nykiel	(Czech Republic) Czech Republic; Tereza Hlavsová; Michaela Balatková; Klara Moravcová

== Medal table ==
№	Country	Gold	Silver	Bronze	Total
1	Russia	4	5	5	14
2	Belarus	3	3	3	9
3	Poland	3	3	1	7
4	Czech Republic	2		2	4
5	Ukraine	1	2	1	4
6	Bulgaria	1		1	2
6	Germany	1		1	2
8	Slovakia	1			1
9	Norway		2		2
10	Slovenia		1	1	2
11	Romania			1	1
