= Biathlon European Championships 1994 =

International biathlon competition

The 1st Biathlon European Championships were held in Kontiolahti, Finland. Six competitions were held for athletes U26: sprint, individual and relays.

== Results ==
=== U26 ===
==== Men's ====
Competition	1st	2nd	3rd
Men's 10 km sprint	(Germany) Holger Schönthier	(Italy) René Cattarinussi	(Finland) Vesa Hietalahti
Men's 20 km individual	(Norway) Tor Espen Kristiansen	(France) Bertrand Muffat-Joly	(Finland) Ville Räikkönen
Men's 4 × 7.5 km relay	(Russia) Russia; Pavel Mouslimov; Pavel Vavilov; Nikolai Klykov; Eduard Riabov	(Poland) Poland; Jan Ziemianin; Wiesław Ziemianin; Jan Wojtas; Tomasz Sikora	(Belarus) Belarus; Igor Khokhryakov; Dmitry Krivel; Gennadiy Karpinkin; Evgeny Redkin

==== Women's ====
Competition	1st	2nd	3rd
Women's 7.5 km sprint	(Russia) Irina Mileshina	(Czech Republic) Jiřina Pelcová	(Germany) Kathi Schwaab
Women's 15 km individual	(Poland) Halina Pitoń	(Slovakia) Martina Jašicová	(Russia) Irina Mileshina
Women's 3 × 6 km relay	(Russia) Russia; Larisa Novoselskaya; Yelena Dumnova; Irina Mileshina	(Slovakia) Slovakia; Martina Jašicová; Anna Murínová; Soňa Mihoková	(Ukraine) Ukraine; Valentyna Tserbe-Nesina; Olena Petrova; Olena Zubrilova

== Medal table ==
No.	Country	Gold	Silver	Bronze	Total
1	Russia	3	0	1	4
2	Poland	1	1	0	2
3	Germany	1	0	1	2
4	Norway	1	0	0	1
5	Slovakia	0	2	0	2
6	France	0	1	0	1
6	Italy	0	1	0	1
6	Czech Republic	0	1	0	1
9	Finland	0	0	2	2
10	Belarus	0	0	1	1
10	Ukraine	0	0	1	1
	TOTALT	6	6	6	18
