= Biathlon European Championships 1998 =

International biathlon competition

The 5th Biathlon European Championships were held in Minsk, Belarus, from January 28 to February 1, 1998.

16 competitions were held: sprint, pursuit, individual and relays both for U26 and juniors.

== Results ==
=== U26 ===
==== Men's ====
Competition	1st	2nd	3rd
Men's 10 km sprint	(Latvia) Jēkabs Nākums	(Belarus) Alexandr Popov	(Latvia) Ilmārs Bricis
Men's 12.5 km pursuit	(Germany) Gunar Bretschneider	(Latvia) Ilmārs Bricis	(Latvia) Oļegs Maļuhins
Men's 20 km individual	(Russia) Sergei Rozhkov	(Germany) Stefan Hodde	(Latvia) Ilmārs Bricis
Men's 4 × 7.5 km relay	(Germany) Germany; Ulf Karkoschka; Marko Morgenstern; Mark Kirchner; Gunar Bretschneider	(Norway) Norway; Kjetil Sæter; Kim Skutbergsveen; Bård Mjølne; Stig-Are Eriksen	(Belarus) Belarus; Igor Pesterev; Alexandr Ivanovski; Ivan Pesterev; Dmitri Shijov

==== Women's ====
Competition	1st	2nd	3rd
Women's 7.5 km sprint	(Russia) Nadezhda Talanova	(Belarus) Natalia Permiakova	(Germany) Peggy Wagenführ
Women's 10 km pursuit	(Russia) Nadezhda Talanova	(Germany) Janet Klein	(Germany) Peggy Wagenführ
Women's 15 km individual	(Russia) Nadezhda Talanova	(Russia) Svetlana Tchernousova	(Russia) Irina Diachkova
Women's 3 × 6 km relay	(Germany) Germany; Peggy Wagenführ; Janet Klein; Andrea Henkel	(Russia) Russia; Irina Diachkova; Svetlana Tchernousova; Yuliya Kondratieva	(Finland) Finland; Satu Pöntiö; Anna-Liisa Rasi; Annukka Mallat

=== Junior ===
==== Men's ====
Competition	1st	2nd	3rd
Men's 10 km sprint	(Russia) Andrei Prokunin	(Finland) Janni Hakkinen	(Slovenia) Danilo Kodela
Men's 12.5 km pursuit	(Finland) Janni Hakkinen	(Russia) Dmitriy Babich	(Russia) Alexei Boltenko
Men's 20 km individual	(Russia) Alexey Korobeynikov	(Poland) Bartołomej Holec	(Belarus) Alexandr Ustinov
Men's 4 × 7.5 km relay	(Russia) Russia; Alexei Boltenko; Dmitriy Babich; Andrei Prokunin; Alexey Korobeynikov	(Ukraine) Ukraine; Oleksandr Bilanenko; Dmytro Borodenko; Oleksandr Khvostenko; Oleh Babych	(Finland) Finland; Janni Häkkinen; Juha Hööpakka; Jarkko Raajala; Timo Saarenpää

==== Women's ====
Competition	1st	2nd	3rd
Women's 7.5 km sprint	(Norway) Gro Marit Istad Kristiansen	(Poland) Magdalena Gwizdoń	(Czech Republic) Lenka Faltusová
Women's 10 km pursuit	(Russia) Larisa Pitateleva	(Poland) Agnieszka Wanżewicz	(Norway) Liv Kjersti Eikeland
Women's 15 km individual	(Norway) Liv Kjersti Eikeland	(Russia) Natalya Geleveriya	(Russia) Anna Bogaliy
Women's 3 × 6 km relay	Russia	Poland	(Czech Republic) Czech Republic; Zdeňka Vejnarová; Jana Pesková; Lenka Faltusová

== Medal table ==
No.	Country	Gold	Silver	Bronze	Total
1	Russia	9	4	3	16
2	Germany	3	2	2	7
3	Norway	2	1	1	4
4	Latvia	1	1	3	5
5	Finland	1	1	2	4
6	Poland	0	4	0	4
7	Belarus	0	2	2	4
8	Ukraine	0	1	0	1
9	Czech Republic	0	0	2	2
10	Slovenia	0	0	1	1
