= Biathlon European Championships 2014 =

International biathlon competition

Biathlon European Championships 2014 official logo

The 21st Biathlon European Championships were held in Nové Město na Moravě, Czech Republic from January 29 to February 4, 2014.

There were total of 15 competitions held: sprint, pursuit and individual both for U26 and U21, relay races for U26 and a mixed relay for U21.

== Schedule of events ==
The schedule of the event stands below. All times in CET.

Date	Time	Event
January 29	10:00	U21 Women's individual
January 29	13:30	U21 Men's individual
January 30	10:00	U26 Women's individual
January 30	13:30	U26 Men's individual
January 31	10:00	U21 Women's sprint
January 31	13:00	U21 Men's sprint
February 1	10:00	U26 Women's sprint
February 1	12:45	U26 Men's sprint
February 2	09:15	U26 Women's pursuit
February 2	10:15	U21 Women's pursuit
February 2	12:30	U26 Men's pursuit
February 2	13:30	U21 Men's pursuit
February 3	12:00	U21 Mixed relay
February 4	10:00	U26 Women's relay
February 4	13:00	U26 Men's relay

== Results ==
=== U26 ===
==== Men's ====
It was the first time ever at the Biathlon European Championships when two sportsmen ranked the same podium place - Andrejs Rastorgujevs and David Komatz in sprint.

Event	Gold	Silver	Bronze
Men's 10 km sprint	(Norway) Lars Helge Birkeland	(Russia) Maxim Tsvetkov	(Latvia) Andrejs Rastorgujevs (Austria) David Komatz
Men's 12.5 km pursuit	(Russia) Maxim Tsvetkov	(Norway) Lars Helge Birkeland	(Russia) Anton Babikov
Men's 20 km individual	(Latvia) Andrejs Rastorgujevs	(Germany) Benedikt Doll	(Russia) Maxim Tsvetkov
Men's 4 x 7.5 km relay	(Austria) Austria; Lorenz Wäger; Michael Reiter; Peter Brunner; David Komatz	(Norway) Norway; Kristoffer Skjelvik; Vetle Ravnsborg Gurigard; Erlend Bjøntegaard; Lars Helge Birkeland	(Germany) Germany; Michael Willeitner; Matthias Bischl; Benedikt Doll; Florian Graf

==== Women's ====
Audrey Vaillancourt from Canada became the first ever non-European biathlete to win a race at the Open Biathlon European Championships. Before that two Kazakh biathletes (Irina Moszewitina won a silver and Olga Dudczenko won a bronze medal in junior's individual race in 2005) and one American biathlete (Lowell Bailey won two bronze medals in the junior sprint and pursuit in 2001) had won medals. Victoria Padial from Spain became the first biathlete from her country to win a medal at the Biathlon European Championships (A Spanish biathlete has never won a medals at the Winter Olympics or World Championships). Mona Brorsson became the first Swedish biathlete to win a race at the Biathlon European Championships.

Event	Gold	Silver	Bronze
Women's 7.5 km sprint	(Norway) Marte Olsbu	(Spain) Victoria Padial	(Ukraine) Iana Bondar
Women's 10 km pursuit	(Sweden) Mona Brorsson	(Spain) Victoria Padial	(Russia) Daria Virolaynen
Women's 15 km individual	(Canada) Audrey Vaillancourt	(Belarus) Nastassia Kalina	(Belarus) Iryna Kryuko
Women's 4 x 6 km relay	(Belarus) Belarus; Iryna Kryuko; Ala Talkach; Aksana Shymanovich; Nastassia Kalina	(Germany) Germany; Karolin Horchler; Annika Knoll; Vanessa Hinz; Maren Hammerschmidt	(Norway) Norway; Ane Skrove Nossum; Hilde Fenne; Bente Landheim; Marte Olsbu

=== U21 ===
==== Men's ====
Rene Zahkna won first ever medal for Estonia at this kind of championships.

Event	Gold	Silver	Bronze
Men's sprint	(Belarus) Raman Yaliotnau	(Czech Republic) Adam Václavík	(Italy) Maikol Demetz
Men's pursuit	(Russia) Alexander Povarnitsyn	(Ukraine) Artem Tyshchenko	(Czech Republic) Adam Václavík
Men's individual	(Estonia) Rene Zahkna	(Russia) Ivan Alekhin	(Ukraine) Artem Tyshchenko

==== Women's ====
Event	Gold	Silver	Bronze
Women's sprint	(Estonia) Tuuli Tomingas	(Russia) Svetlana Mironova	(Russia) Uliana Kaisheva
Women's pursuit	(Russia) Svetlana Mironova	(Russia) Uliana Kaisheva	(Austria) Dunja Zdouc
Women's individual	(Russia) Anastasia Evsyunina	(Ukraine) Anastasiya Merkushyna	(Italy) Lisa Vittozzi

==== Mixed ====
Event	Gold	Silver	Bronze
2 x 6 + 2 x 7.5 relay	(Ukraine) Ukraine; Yuliya Bryhynets; Yuliya Zhuravok; Andriy Dotsenko; Artem Tyshchenko	(Russia) Russia; Anastasia Evsyunina; Uliana Kaisheva; Eduard Latypov; Alexander Povarnitsyn	(Estonia) Estonia; Meril Beilmann; Tuuli Tomingas; Johan Talihärm; Rene Zahkna

== Medal table ==
Rank	Nation	Gold	Silver	Bronze	Total
1	Russia (RUS)	4	5	4	13
2	Norway (NOR)	2	2	1	5
3	Belarus (BLR)	2	1	1	4
4	Estonia (EST)	2	0	1	3
5	Ukraine (UKR)	1	2	2	5
6	Austria (AUT)	1	0	2	3
7	Latvia (LAT)	1	0	1	2
8	Canada (CAN)	1	0	0	1
8	Sweden (SWE)	1	0	0	1
10	Germany (GER)	0	2	1	3
11	Czech Republic (CZE)	0	2	0	2
11	Spain (ESP)	0	2	0	2
13	Italy (ITA)	0	0	2	2
Totals (13 entries)		15	16	15	46

== Participating countries ==
33 nations competed

- Australia
- Austria
- Belarus
- Bosnia and Herzegovina
- Bulgaria
- Canada
- Croatia
- Czech Republic
- Estonia
- Finland
- France
- Germany
- Greece
- Hungary
- Italy
- Latvia
- Lithuania
- Moldova
- Netherlands
- New Zealand
- Norway
- Poland
- Romania
- Russia
- Serbia
- Slovakia
- Slovenia
- Spain
- Sweden
- Switzerland
- Ukraine
- United States
- Uzbekistan
