= Biathlon European Championships 1996 =

International biathlon competition

The 3rd Biathlon European Championships were held in Ridnaun, Italy. Six competitions were held for athletes U26: sprint, individual and relays.

== Results ==
=== U26 ===
==== Men's ====
Competition	1st	2nd	3rd
Men's 10 km sprint	(Russia) Vladimir Drachev	(Russia) Sergei Tarasov	(Belarus) Oleg Ryzhenkov
Men's 20 km individual	(Russia) Sergei Tarasov	(Russia) Sergei Rozhkov	(Belarus) Alexandr Popov
Men's 4 × 7.5 km relay	(Russia) Russia; Viktor Maigourov; Vladimir Drachev; Sergei Rozhkov; Aleksey Kobelev	(Belarus) Belarus; Alexei Aidarov; Oleg Ryzhenkov; Vadim Sashurin; Alexandr Popov	(Germany) Germany; Ulf Karkoschka; Marco Morgenstern; Jan Wüstenfeld; Carsten Heymann

==== Women's ====
Competition	1st	2nd	3rd
Women's 7.5 km sprint	(Czech Republic) Eva Háková	(Slovakia) Soňa Mihoková	(Russia) Galina Kukleva
Women's 15 km individual	(Slovenia) Andreja Grašič	(Russia) Olga Melnik	(Poland) Anna Stera
Women's 3 × 6 km relay	(Russia) Russia; Olga Melnik; Galina Kukleva; Olga Romasko	(Ukraine) Ukraine; Tetyana Vodopyanova; Valentina Tserbe-Nessina; Olena Zubrilova	(Belarus) Belarus; Natalia Ryzhenkova; Natalia Permiakova; Svetlana Paramygina

== Medal table ==
No.	Country	Gold	Silver	Bronze	Total
1	Russia	4	3	1	8
2	Czech Republic	1	0	0	1
2	Slovenia	1	0	0	1
4	Belarus	0	1	3	4
5	Slovakia	0	1	0	1
5	Ukraine	0	1	0	1
7	Germany	0	0	1	1
7	Poland	0	0	1	1
