= Biathlon European Championships =

Annual biathlon competition since 1994

- Status: active
- Genre: sports competition
- Date: January–February
- Frequency: annual
- Location: various
- Inaugurated: 1994
- Organiser: IBU

The Biathlon European Championships are the top-European competitions in biathlon. The first edition was held in 1994, with sprint, pursuit, individual and relay. The number of events has grown significantly over the years. Till 2015, the competitions included also junior events but since 2016 the Junior Championships are held separately.

== Participation of non-European competitors ==
Even though the event is called European Championships, the event is not restricted to European athletes only. The full name of the competition is Open Biathlon European Championships, meaning that biathletes from non-European countries are eligible to participate and their results being recognised. There are three instances in which non-European competitors have won medals. Lowell Bailey from the United States became the first non-European to win a medal by winning bronze in the Junior Sprint event in 2001, followed by another bronze in the Junior Pursuit. Audrey Vaillancourt of Canada became the first non-European athlete to win gold in the competition, winning the Women's 15 km individual in 2014.

== Editions ==
Number	Year	Host city	Events
—	1993	(Slovakia) Osrblie	
1	1994	(Finland) Kontiolahti	6
2	1995	(France) Le Grand-Bornand	6
3	1996	(Italy) Ridnaun	6
4	1997	(Austria) Windischgarsten	6
5	1998	(Belarus) Minsk	16
6	1999	(Russia) Izhevsk	8
7	2000	(Poland) Zakopane	16
8	2001	(France) Maurienne	16
9	2002	(Finland) Kontiolahti	16
10	2003	(Italy) Forni Avoltri	16
11	2004	(Belarus) Minsk	16
12	2005	(Russia) Novosibirsk	16
13	2006	(Germany) Langdorf	16
14	2007	(Bulgaria) Bansko	16
15	2008	(Czech Republic) Nové Město na Moravě	16
16	2009	(Russia) Ufa	16
17	2010	(Estonia) Otepää	15
18	2011	(Italy) Ridnaun	15
19	2012	(Slovakia) Osrblie	15
20	2013	(Bulgaria) Bansko	14
21	2014	(Czech Republic) Nové Město na Moravě	15
22	2015	(Estonia) Otepää	15
23	2016	(Russia) Tyumen	8
24	2017	(Poland) Duszniki-Zdrój	8
25	2018	(Italy) Ridnaun	8
26	2019	(Belarus) Raubichi	8
27	2020	(Belarus) Raubichi	8
28	2021	(Poland) Duszniki-Zdrój	8
29	2022	(Germany) Arber	8
30	2023	(Switzerland) Lenzerheide	8
31	2024	(Slovakia) Osrblie	8
32	2025	(Italy) Val Martello	8
33	2026	(Norway) Sjusjøen	8

== Winners ==
=== Men ===
Year	Host	Individual	Sprint	Pursuit	Relay
1994	(Finland) Kontiolahti	(Norway) Tor Espen Kristiansen	(Germany) Holger Schönthier	no competition	Russia
1995	(France) Le Grand-Bornand	(Belarus) Igor Khokhryakov	(France) Raphaël Poirée	no competition	Belarus
1996	(Italy) Ridnaun	(Russia) Sergei Tarasov	(Russia) Vladimir Drachev	no competition	Russia
1997	(Austria) Windischgarsten	(Russia) Sergei Rozhkov	(Russia) Andrei Padin	no competition	Germany
1998	(Belarus) Minsk	(Russia) Sergei Rozhkov	(Latvia) Jēkabs Nākums	(Germany) Gunar Bretschneider	Germany
1999	(Russia) Izhevsk	(Russia) Sergei Konovalov	(Germany) Alexander Wolf	no competition	Germany
2000	(Poland) Zakopane	(Czech Republic) Zdeněk Vítek	(Germany) Andreas Stitzl	(Poland) Tomasz Sikora	Germany
2001	(France) Maurienne	(Austria) Günther Beck	(France) Vincent Defrasne	(France) Vincent Defrasne	Germany
2002	(Finland) Kontiolahti	(Ukraine) Andriy Deryzemlia	(Latvia) Oļegs Maļuhins	(Latvia) Oļegs Maļuhins	Germany
2003	(Italy) Forni Avoltri	(Ukraine) Olexander Bilanenko	(Ukraine) Oleksiy Korobeinikov	(Ukraine) Andriy Deryzemlia	Germany
2004	(Belarus) Minsk	(Slovakia) Matej Kazár	(Czech Republic) Ondřej Moravec	(Czech Republic) Ondřej Moravec	Belarus
2005	(Russia) Novosibirsk	(Germany) Carsten Pump	(Belarus) Alexei Aidarov	(Ukraine) Andriy Deryzemlya	Russia
2006	(Germany) Langdorf	(Norway) Alexander Os	(Czech Republic) Jaroslav Soukup	(Belarus) Sergey Novikov	Belarus
2007	(Bulgaria) Bansko	(Norway) Egil Gjelland	(Poland) Tomasz Sikora	(Poland) Tomasz Sikora	Germany
2008	(Czech Republic) Nové Město	(Poland) Tomasz Sikora	(Russia) Artem Gussev	(Russia) Sergei Konovalov	Russia
2009	(Russia) Ufa	(Russia) Victor Vasilyev	(Norway) Rune Brattsveen	(Germany) Daniel Böhm	Norway
2010	(Estonia) Otepää	(Germany) Christoph Knie	(Germany) Daniel Böhm	(Russia) Alexey Volkov	Germany
2011	(Italy) Ridnaun	(Ukraine) Artem Pryma	(Austria) Tobias Eberhard	(Russia) Alexey Volkov	Germany
2012	(Slovakia) Osrblie	(Germany) Daniel Böhm	(Russia) Alexey Volkov	(Russia) Alexey Volkov	Germany
2013	(Bulgaria) Bansko	(Ukraine) Serhiy Semenov	(Norway) Vetle Sjåstad Christiansen	(Germany) Benedikt Doll	cancelled
2014	(Czech Republic) Nové Město	(Latvia) Andrejs Rastorgujevs	(Norway) Lars Helge Birkeland	(Russia) Maxim Tsvetkov	Austria
2015	(Estonia) Otepää	(Russia) Alexey Volkov	(Russia) Alexey Slepov	(Russia) Alexey Slepov	Ukraine
Year	Host	Mass Start	Sprint	Pursuit	Relay
2016	(Russia) Tyumen	(Germany) Florian Graf	(Russia) Evgeniy Garanichev	(Russia) Anton Babikov	no competition
Year	Host	Individual	Sprint	Pursuit	no competition
2017	(Poland) Duszniki-Zdrój	(Russia) Alexandr Loginov	(Bulgaria) Vladimir Iliev	(Russia) Alexandr Loginov	no competition
2018	(Italy) Ridnaun	(Austria) Felix Leitner	(Latvia) Andrejs Rastorgujevs	(Russia) Alexandr Loginov	no competition
2019	(Belarus) Raubichi	(Bulgaria) Krasimir Anev	(Norway) Tarjei Bø	(Norway) Tarjei Bø	no competition
Year	Host	Super Sprint	Sprint	Pursuit	no competition
2020	(Belarus) Raubichi	(Belarus) Sergey Bocharnikov	(Russia) Matvey Eliseev	(Belarus) Sergey Bocharnikov	no competition
Year	Host	Individual	Sprint	Pursuit	no competition
2021	(Poland) Duszniki-Zdrój	(Norway) Erlend Bjøntegaard	(Switzerland) Martin Jäger	(Ukraine) Artem Pryma	no competition
2022	(Germany) Arber	(Norway) Sverre Dahlen Aspenes	(Norway) Erlend Bjøntegaard	(Norway) Sverre Dahlen Aspenes	no competition
2023	(Switzerland) Lenzerheide	(Norway) Endre Strømsheim	(Norway) Erlend Bjøntegaard	(Norway) Vebjørn Sørum	no competition
2024	(Slovakia) Osrblie	(Norway) Vebjørn Sørum	(France) Antonin Guigonnat	(Norway) Isak Frey	no competition
2025	(Italy) Val Martello	(Norway) Isak Frey	(Norway) Sivert Guttorm Bakken	(Italy) Patrick Braunhofer	Norway
2026	(Norway) Sjusjøen	(France) Antonin Guigonnat	(France) Damien Levet	(Norway) Isak Frey	Norway

=== Women ===
Year	Host	Individual	Sprint	Pursuit	Relay
1994	(Finland) Kontiolahti	(Poland) Halina Piton	(Russia) Irina Mileshina	no competition	Russia
1995	(France) Le Grand-Bornand	(Belarus) Svetlana Paramygina	(France) Corinne Niogret	no competition	France
1996	(Italy) Ridnaun	(Slovenia) Andreja Grašič	(Czech Republic) Eva Háková	no competition	Russia
1997	(Austria) Windischgarsten	(Germany) Katja Beer	(Poland) Anna Stera	no competition	Russia
1998	(Belarus) Minsk	(Russia) Nadezhda Talanova	(Russia) Nadezhda Talanova	(Russia) Nadezhda Talanova	Germany
1999	(Russia) Izhevsk	(Germany) Kathi Swaab	(Russia) Natalya Sokolova	no competition	Russia
2000	(Poland) Zakopane	(Bulgaria) Iva Karagiozova	(Poland) Magdalena Gwizdoń	(Poland) Magdalena Grzywa	Slovakia
2001	(France) Maurienne	(Ukraine) Oksana Yakovleva	(Germany) Katja Beer	(Germany) Katja Beer	Germany
2002	(Finland) Kontiolahti	(Bulgaria) Radka Popova	(Russia) Irina Malgina	(Russia) Irina Malgina	Germany
2003	(Italy) Forni Avoltri	(Russia) Elena Khrustaleva	(Slovakia) Martina Halinárová	(Belarus) Ekaterina Vinogradova	Russia
2004	(Belarus) Minsk	(Bulgaria) Ekaterina Dafovska	(Belarus) Olena Zubrilova	(Ukraine) Olena Petrova	Russia
2005	(Russia) Novosibirsk	(Russia) Svetlana Ishmuratova	(Russia) Svetlana Chernousova	(Ukraine) Oksana Khvostenko	Russia
2006	(Germany) Langdorf	(Bulgaria) Pavlina Filipova	(Ukraine) Nina Lemesh	(Belarus) Natalya Sokolova	Belarus
2007	(Bulgaria) Bansko	(Ukraine) Oksana Yakovleva	(Belarus) Darya Domracheva	(Belarus) Olga Kudrashova	Belarus
2008	(Czech Republic) Nové Město	(Moldova) Natalia Levchenkova	(Ukraine) Oksana Yakovleva	(Ukraine) Nina Karasevych	Ukraine
2009	(Russia) Ufa	(Germany) Juliane Döll	(Slovakia) Anastasiya Kuzmina	(Slovakia) Anastasiya Kuzmina	Ukraine
2010	(Estonia) Otepää	(Germany) Kathrin Hitzer	(Ukraine) Valentina Semerenko	(Ukraine) Vita Semerenko	Germany
2011	(Italy) Ridnaun	(Germany) Juliane Döll	(Germany) Juliane Döll	(Germany) Juliane Döll	Ukraine
2012	(Slovakia) Osrblie	(Russia) Anastasia Zagoruiko	(Ukraine) Olena Pidhrushna	(Ukraine) Olena Pidhrushna	Ukraine
2013	(Bulgaria) Bansko	(Russia) Anastasia Zagoruiko	(Russia) Irina Starykh	(Poland) Monika Hojnisz	Germany
2014	(Czech Republic) Nové Město	(Canada) Audrey Vaillancourt	(Norway) Marte Olsbu	(Sweden) Mona Brorsson	Belarus
2015	(Estonia) Otepää	(Romania) Luminița Pișcoran	(France) Coline Varcin	(Russia) Ekaterina Shumilova	Ukraine
Year	Host	Mass Start	Sprint	Pursuit	Relay
2016	(Russia) Tyumen	(Germany) Luise Kummer	(Germany) Nadine Horchler	(Belarus) Nadezhda Skardino	no competition
Year	Host	Individual	Sprint	Pursuit	no competition
2017	(Poland) Duszniki-Zdrój	(Russia) Irina Starykh	(Ukraine) Juliya Dzhyma	(Russia) Irina Starykh	no competition
2018	(Italy) Ridnaun	(France) Chloé Chevalier	(Ukraine) Iryna Varvynets	(France) Chloé Chevalier	no competition
2019	(Belarus) Raubichi	(Sweden) Hanna Öberg	(Sweden) Mona Brorsson	(Russia) Ekaterina Yurlova-Percht	no competition
Year	Host	Super Sprint	Sprint	Pursuit	no competition
2020	(Belarus) Raubichi	(Russia) Evgeniya Pavlova	(Sweden) Elisabeth Högberg	(Belarus) Elena Kruchinkina	no competition
Year	Host	Individual	Sprint	Pursuit	no competition
2021	(Poland) Duszniki-Zdrój	(Poland) Monika Hojnisz-Staręga	(Latvia) Baiba Bendika	(Poland) Kamila Żuk	no competition
2022	(Germany) Arber	(Russia) Evgeniya Burtasova	(Norway) Ragnhild Femsteinevik	(Moldova) Alina Stremous	no competition
2023	(Switzerland) Lenzerheide	(Germany) Lisa Maria Spark	(Ukraine) Anastasiya Merkushyna	(Germany) Selina Grotian	no competition
2024	(Slovakia) Osrblie	(Norway) Maren Kirkeeide	(Norway) Ida Lien	(Norway) Maren Kirkeeide	no competition
2025	(Italy) Val Martello	(Germany) Johanna Puff	(Sweden) Anna-Karin Heijdenberg	(Latvia) Baiba Bendika	Germany
2026	(Norway) Sjusjøen	(Ukraine) Anastasiya Merkushyna	(France) Gilonne Guigonnat	(France) Gilonne Guigonnat	France

=== Mixed ===
Year	Host	Single mixed relay	Mixed relay
2016	(Russia) Tyumen	Russia Victoria Slivko; Anton Babikov	Russia Anastasia Zagoruiko; Olga Iakushova; Matvey Eliseev; Evgeniy Garanichev
2017	(Poland) Duszniki-Zdrój	Russia Daria Virolaynen; Evgeniy Garanichev	Russia Irina Starykh; Svetlana Sleptsova; Alexey Volkov; Alexandr Loginov
2018	(Italy) Ridnaun	Norway Thekla Brun-Lie; Vetle Sjåstad Christiansen	Ukraine Yuliya Zhuravok; Iryna Varvynets; Artem Pryma; Dmytro Pidruchnyi
2019	(Belarus) Raubichi	Russia Evgeniya Pavlova; Dmitry Malyshko	Sweden Emma Nilsson; Mona Brorsson; Martin Ponsiluoma; Sebastian Samuelsson
2020	(Belarus) Raubichi	Norway Karoline Erdal; Endre Strømsheim	Ukraine Valentyna Semerenko; Yuliia Dzhima; Artem Pryma (2); Dmytro Pidruchnyi (2)
2021	(Poland) Duszniki-Zdrój	Germany Stefanie Scherer; Justus Strelow	Norway Emilie Kalkenberg; Åsne Skrede; Erlend Bjøntegaard; Sivert Guttorm Bakken
2022	(Germany) Arber	Russia Anton Babikov (2); Evgeniya Burtasova (2)	Norway Erlend Bjøntegaard; Johannes Dale; Jenny Enodd; Ragnhild Femsteinevik
2023	(Switzerland) Lenzerheide	Norway Juni Arnekleiv; Endre Strømsheim	Norway Maren Kirkeeide; Karoline Erdal; Erlend Bjøntegaard (2); Vebjørn Sørum
2024	(Slovakia) Osrblie	Sweden Anton Ivarsson; Sara Andersson	Norway Isak Frey; Johan-Olav Botn; Ida Lien; Maren Kirkeeide (2)

== Medals table ==
Updated after 2026 Championships

Rank	Nation	Gold	Silver	Bronze	Total
1	Russia	59	47	48	154
2	Germany	44	41	45	130
3	Norway	35	35	30	100
4	Ukraine	31	32	22	85
5	Belarus	19	17	24	60
6	France	14	14	22	50
7	Poland	13	11	10	34
8	Sweden	7	6	5	18
9	Latvia	7	4	10	21
10	Bulgaria	6	7	11	24
11	Slovakia	4	7	3	14
12	Austria	4	2	4	10
13	Czech Republic	3	14	5	22
14	Moldova	2	2	0	4
15	Italy	1	4	6	11
16	Slovenia	1	1	2	4
17	Switzerland	1	1	1	3
18	Romania	1	1	0	2
19	Canada	1	0	0	1
20	Lithuania	0	2	0	2
20	Spain	0	2	0	2
22	Finland	0	0	3	3
23	Japan	0	0	1	1
23	United States	0	0	1	1
Totals (24 entries)		253	250	253	756
