= Biathlon European Championships 2005 =

International biathlon competition

The 12th Biathlon European Championships were held in Novosibirsk, Russia from February 16 to February 20, 2005.

There were total of 16 competitions held: sprint, pursuit, individual and relay both for U26 and U21.

== Results ==
=== U26 ===
==== Men's ====
Competition	1st	2nd	3rd
Men's 10 km sprint	(Belarus) Alexei Aidarov	(Ukraine) Andriy Deryzemlya	(Russia) Aleksei Boltienko
Men's 12.5 km pursuit	(Ukraine) Andriy Deryzemlya	(Germany) Carsten Pump	(Russia) Aleksei Boltienko
Men's 20 km individual	(Germany) Carsten Pump	(Slovakia) Pavol Hurajt	(Russia) Pavel Rostovtsev
Men's 4 × 7.5 km relay	(Russia) Russia; Aleksei Boltienko; Sergei Balandin; Pavel Rostovtsev; Dmitri Yaroshenko	(Ukraine) Ukraine; Vyacheslav Derkach; Andriy Deryzemlya; Oleksiy Korobeinikov; Oleksandr Bilanenko	(Germany) Germany; Hansjörg Reuter; Carsten Pump; Carsten Heymann; Jörn Wollschläger

==== Women's ====
Competition	1st	2nd	3rd
Women's 7.5 km sprint	(Russia) Svetlana Chernousova	(Russia) Svetlana Ishmuratova	(Russia) Anna Bogaliy
Women's 10 km pursuit	(Ukraine) Oksana Khvostenko	(Russia) Irina Malgina	(Russia) Anna Bogaliy
Women's 15 km individual	(Russia) Svetlana Ishmuratova	(Germany) Sabrina Buchholz	(Russia) Anna Bogaliy
Women's 4 × 6 km relay	(Russia) Russia; Irina Malgina; Elena Khrustaleva; Svetlana Ishmuratova; Anna Bogaliy	(Ukraine) Ukraine; Oksana Khvostenko; Nina Lemesh; Iryna Tananyko; Oksana Yakovleva	(Czech Republic) Czech Republic; Lenka Faltusová; Magda Rezlerová; Irena Česneková; Zdeňka Vejnarová

=== U21 ===
==== Men's ====
Competition	1st	2nd	3rd
Men's 10 km sprint	(Ukraine) Oleh Berezhnyi	(Czech Republic) Ondřej Moravec	(Russia) Ivan Panchenko
Men's 12.5 km pursuit	(Czech Republic) Ondřej Moravec	(Ukraine) Oleh Berezhnyi	(Russia) Ivan Panchenko
Men's 20 km individual	(Russia) Igor Minchenko	(Ukraine) Oleh Berezhnyi	(Russia) Kiril Shcherbakov
Men's 4 × 7.5 km relay	(Russia) Russia; Igor Minchenko; Ivan Panchenko; Andrei Yevstropov; Pavel Borisov	(Slovenia) Slovenia; Andraž Šemrov; Klemen Bauer; Matej Brvar; Peter Dokl	(Ukraine) Ukraine; Ihor Yashchenko; Yevhen Horbachov; Oleh Berezhnyi; Oleksandr Kolos

==== Women's ====
Competition	1st	2nd	3rd
Women's 7.5 km sprint	(Russia) Anna Boulygina	(Russia) Anastasiya Kuzmina	(Russia) Liubov Petrova
Women's 10 km pursuit	(Russia) Anastasiya Kuzmina	(Russia) Liubov Petrova	(Russia) Anna Boulygina
Women's 15 km individual	(Poland) Paulina Bobak	(Kazakhstan) Irina Moshevitina	(Kazakhstan) Olga Dudchenko
Women's 3 × 6 km relay	(Russia) Russia; Maria Kosinova; Anastasia Kuznietsova; Ekaterina Savina	(Poland) Poland; Paulina Bobak; Weronika Nowakowska-Ziemniak; Agnieszka Grzybek	(Ukraine) Ukraine; Vita Semerenko; Valj Semerenko; Nina Karasevych

== Medal table ==
No.	Country	Gold	Silver	Bronze	Total
1	Russia	9	4	11	24
2	Ukraine	3	5	2	10
3	Germany	1	2	1	4
4	Czech Republic	1	1	1	3
5	Poland	1	1		2
6	Belarus	1			1
7	Kazakhstan		1	1	2
8	Slovakia		1		1
8	Slovenia		1		1
