= Biathlon European Championships 2001 =

International biathlon competition

The 8th Biathlon European Championships were held in Maurienne, France, from January 24 to January 28, 2001.

There were total of 16 competitions held: sprint, pursuit, individual and relay both for U26 and U21.

== Results ==
=== U26 ===
==== Men's ====
Competition	1st	2nd	3rd
Men's 10 km sprint	(France) Vincent Defrasne	(Poland) Wiesław Ziemianin	(Ukraine) Vyacheslav Derkach
Men's 12.5 km pursuit	(France) Vincent Defrasne	(Germany) Michael Greis	(Poland) Wiesław Ziemianin
Men's 20 km individual	(Austria) Günther Beck	(Germany) Andreas Stitzl	(France) Gaël Poirée
Men's 4 × 7.5 km relay	(Germany) Germany; Jörn Wollschläger; Andreas Stitzl; Michael Greis; Alexander Wolf	(Poland) Poland; Wiesław Ziemianin; Wojciech Kozub; Krzysztof Topór; Tomasz Sikora	(Italy) Italy; Theo Senoner; Sergio Bonaldi; Helmuth Messner; Ivan Romanin

==== Women's ====
Competition	1st	2nd	3rd
Women's 7.5 km sprint	(Germany) Katja Beer	(Germany) Simone Denkinger	(Belarus) Olga Nazarova
Women's 10 km pursuit	(Germany) Katja Beer	(Russia) Lilia Efremova	(Germany) Sabine Flatscher
Women's 15 km individual	(Ukraine) Oksana Yakovleva	(France) Christelle Gros	(Bulgaria) Iva Karagiozova
Women's 4 × 6 km relay	(Germany) Germany; Katja Beer; Simone Denkinger; Sabine Flatscher; Ina Menzel	(Russia) Russia; Olga Zaitseva; Lilia Efremova; Natalya Sokolova; Olga Romasko	(Ukraine) Ukraine; Iryna Merkushina; Oksana Yakovleva; Oksana Khvostenko; Nina Lemesh

=== U21 ===
==== Men's ====
Competition	1st	2nd	3rd
Men's 10 km sprint	(Russia) Vitaliy Chernyshov	(Italy) Christian De Lorenzi	(United States) Lowell Bailey
Men's 12.5 km pursuit	(Russia) Vitaliy Chernyshov	(Russia) Aleksei Soloviov	(United States) Lowell Bailey
Men's 20 km individual	(Russia) Nikolay Kruglov Jr.	(Czech Republic) Michal Šlesingr	(Russia) Vitaliy Chernyshov
Men's 4 × 7.5 km relay	(Russia) Russia; Vitaliy Chernyshov; Aleksey Konchin; Aleksei Soloviov; Nikolay Kruglov Jr.	(France) France; Yann Debayle; Sylvain Mouton; Julien Ughetto; Sebastien Zeno	(Czech Republic) Czech Republic; Jiři Faltus; Michal Šlesingr; Milan Faltus; Jaroslav Soukup

==== Women's ====
Competition	1st	2nd	3rd
Women's 7.5 km sprint	(Russia) Tatiana Moiseeva	(Russia) Yuliya Makarova	(Czech Republic) Zdeňka Vejnarová
Women's 10 km pursuit	(Russia) Yuliya Makarova	(Russia) Tatiana Moiseeva	(Czech Republic) Zdeňka Vejnarová
Women's 15 km individual	(France) Anne Lise Bailly	(Russia) Tatiana Moiseeva	(France) Delphyne Peretto
Women's 3 × 6 km relay	(Russia) Russia; Tatiana Moiseeva; Marina Botchukova; Yuliya Makarova	(Czech Republic) Czech Republic; Magda Rezlerová; Klára Moravcová; Zdeňka Vejnarová	(France) France; Delphyne Peretto; Célia Bourgeois; Anne Lise Bailly

== Medal table ==
№	Country	Gold	Silver	Bronze	Total
1	Russia	7	6	1	14
2	Germany	4	3	1	8
3	France	3	2	3	8
4	Ukraine	1		2	3
5	Austria	1			1
6	Czech Republic		2	3	5
7	Poland		2	1	3
8	Italy		1	1	2
9	United States			2	2
10	Belarus			1	1
10	Bulgaria			1	1
