= Valentina Tserbe-Nessina =

Ukrainian biathlete (born 1969)

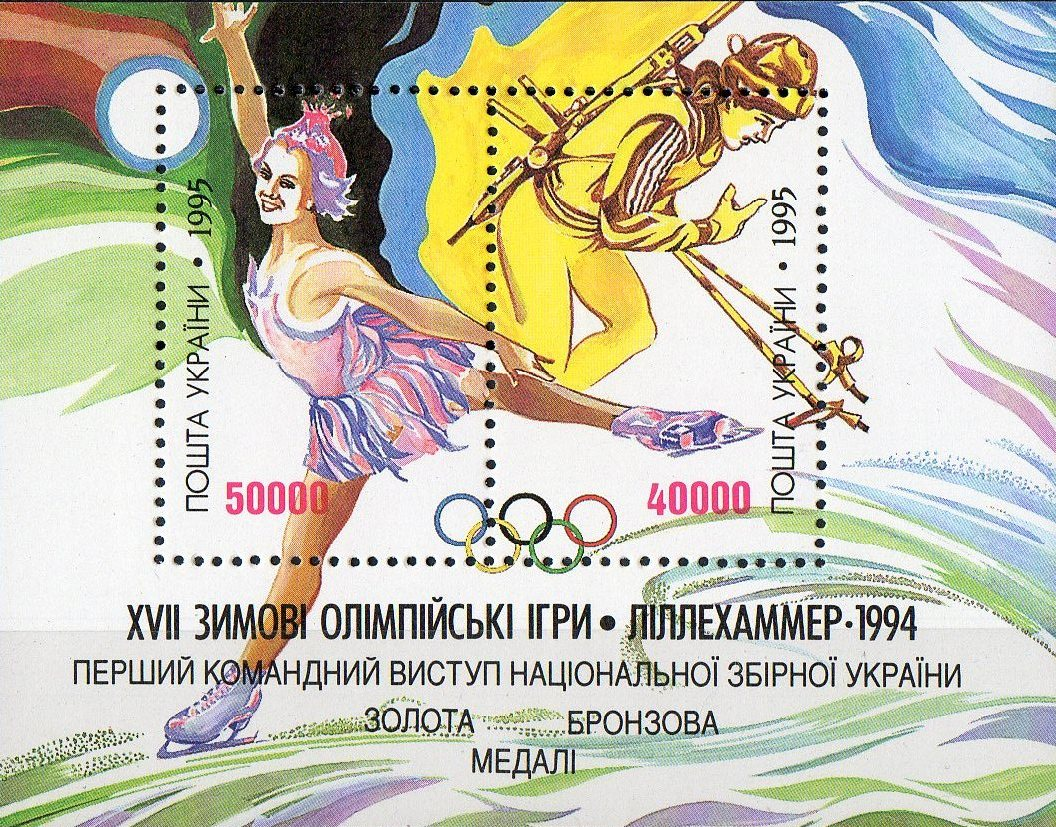
- Tserbe-Nessina (right) on a Ukrainian stamp.

Personal information
- Full name: Valentina Tserbe-Nessina
- Born: 8 January 1969 (age 57) Poliske, Zhytomyr Oblast, Ukrainian SSR, Soviet Union
- Height: 1.62 m (5 ft 4 in)

Sport

Professional information
- Sport: Biathlon
- World Cup debut: 13 January 1994

Olympic Games
- Teams: 2 (1994, 1998)
- Medals: 1 (0 gold)

World Championships
- Teams: 4 (1995, 1996, 1997, 1998)
- Medals: 2 (0 gold)

World Cup
- Seasons: 5 (1993/94–1997/98)
- Individual victories: 0
- All victories: 1
- Individual podiums: 1
- All podiums: 6
Medal record
Representing Ukraine
Women's biathlon
Olympic Games
Bronze medal – third place	1994 Lillehammer	7.5 km sprint
World Championships
Bronze medal – third place	1996 Rupholding	4 × 7.5 km relay
Bronze medal – third place	1997 Brezno-Osrblie	Team event
European Championships
Silver medal – second place	1995 Le Grand-Bornand	Relay
Silver medal – second place	1996 Ridnaun	Relay
Bronze medal – third place	1994 Kontiolahti	Relay

Valentina Tserbe-Nessina (Ukrainian: Валентина Адамівна Цербе-Несіна; born 8 January 1969) is a Ukrainian biathlete. At the 1994 Winter Olympics in Lillehammer, she won a bronze medal in the 7.5 km sprint, and finished 5th with the Ukrainian relay team.

She finished 5th with the Ukraine relay team at the 1998 Winter Olympics in Nagano.
