= Pavel Muslimov =

Russian biathlete

Pavel Mouslimov
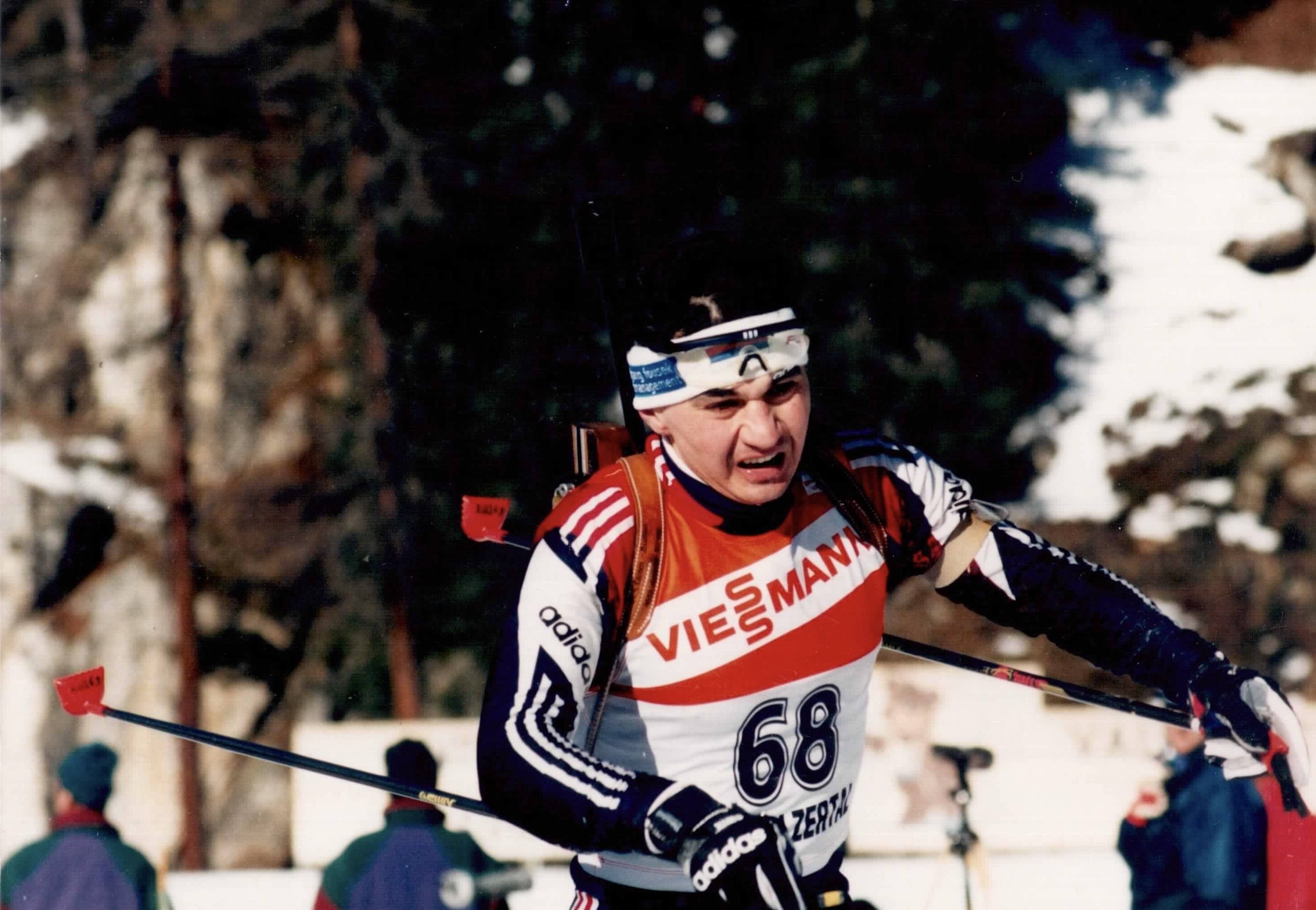

Personal information
- Full name: Pavel Ilyich Mouslimov
- Born: 15 June 1967 (age 59) Ufa, RSFSR, Soviet Union
- Height: 1.78 m (5 ft 10 in)

Sport

Professional information
- Sport: Biathlon
- World Cup debut: 19 December 1991

Olympic Games
- Teams: 1 (1998)
- Medals: 1

World Championships
- Teams: 4 (1995, 1996, 1997, 1998)
- Medals: 2

World Cup
- Seasons: 4 (1994/95–1997/98)
- Individual victories: 1
- All victories: 5
- Individual podiums: 6
- All podiums: 14
Medal record
Men's biathlon
Representing Russia
Olympic Games
Bronze medal – third place	1998 Nagano	4 × 7.5 km relay
World Championships
Silver medal – second place	1995 Antholz Anterselva	10 km sprint
Silver medal – second place	1996 Ruhpolding	Team event
European Championships
Gold medal – first place	1994 Kontiolahti	4*7.5 km relay
Silver medal – second place	1999 Izhevsk	4*7.5 km relay
Bronze medal – third place	2000 Zakopane	4*7.5 km relay
Winter Universiade
Gold medal – first place	1993 Zakopane	20 km individual
Silver medal – second place	1993 Zakopane	4*7.5 km relay
Men's cross-country skiing
Representing Russia
Winter Universiade
Gold medal – first place	1993 Zakopane	4*10 km relay

Pavel Iliych Mouslimov (Russian: Павел Ильич Муслимов) (born June 15, 1967 in Ufa) is a former Russian biathlete.

== Biathlon results ==
All results are sourced from the International Biathlon Union.

=== Olympic Games ===
1 medal (1 bronze)

Event	Individual	Sprint	Relay
(Japan) 1998 Nagano	17th	—	Bronze

=== World Championships ===
2 medals (2 silver)

Event	Individual	Sprint	Pursuit	Team	Relay
(Italy) 1995 Antholz-Anterselva	22nd	Silver	—N/a	—	8th
(Germany) 1996 Rupolding	12th	—	—N/a	Silver	—
(Slovakia) 1997 Brezno-Osrblie	11th	18th	17th	15th	—
(Slovenia) 1998 Pokljuka	—N/a	—N/a	21st	—	—N/a

*During Olympic seasons competitions are only held for those events not included in the Olympic program.
**Pursuit was added in 1997.

=== Individual victories ===
1 victories (1 In)

Season	Date	Location	Discipline	Level
1996–97; 1 victory (1 In)	13 March 1997	(Russia) Novosibirsk	20 km individual	Biathlon World Cup

*Results are from UIPMB and IBU races which include the Biathlon World Cup, Biathlon World Championships and the Winter Olympic Games.

== Gallery ==
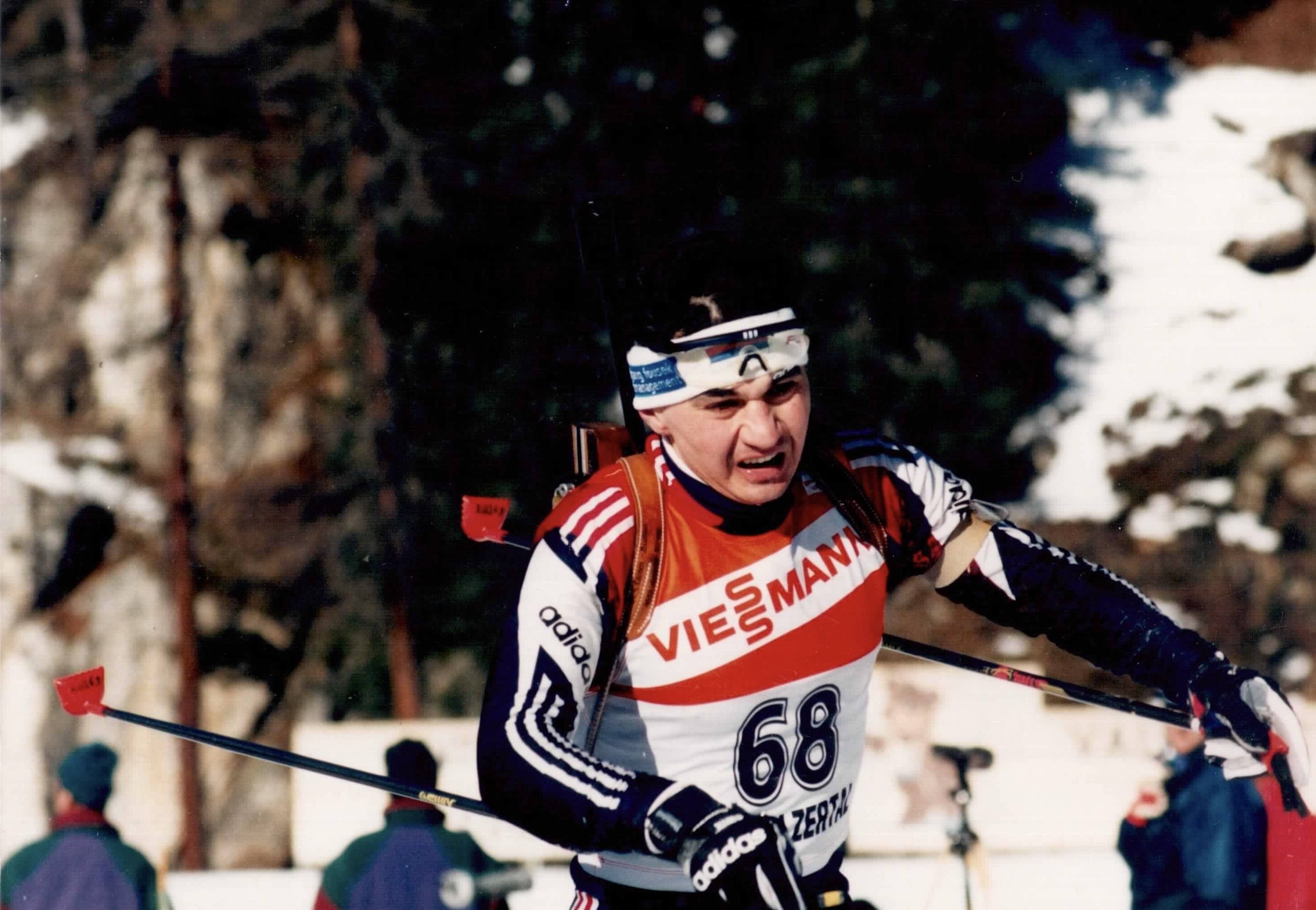
Biathlon World Cup 1997 Antholz sprint

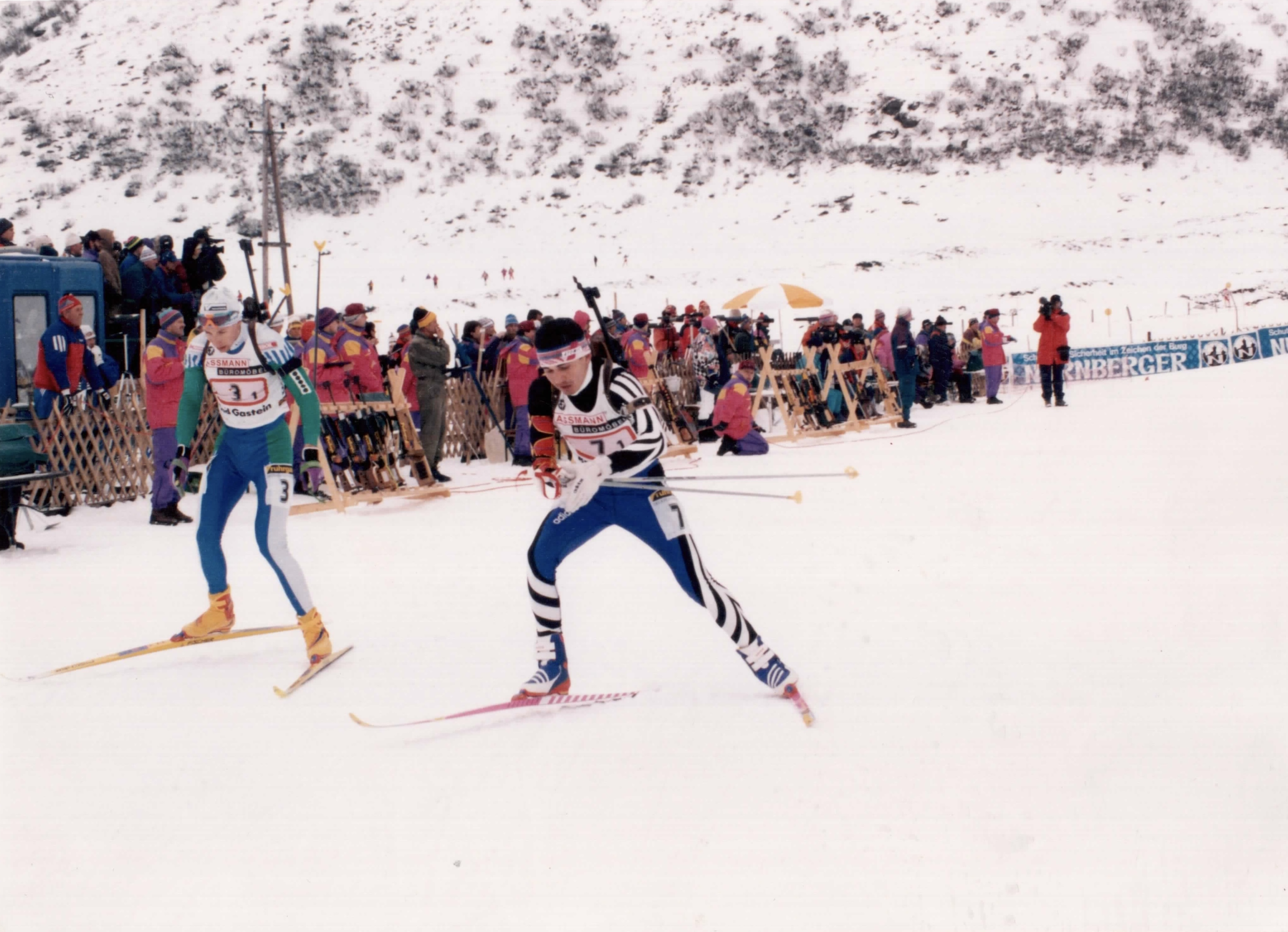
Biathlon 1994, Bad Gastein

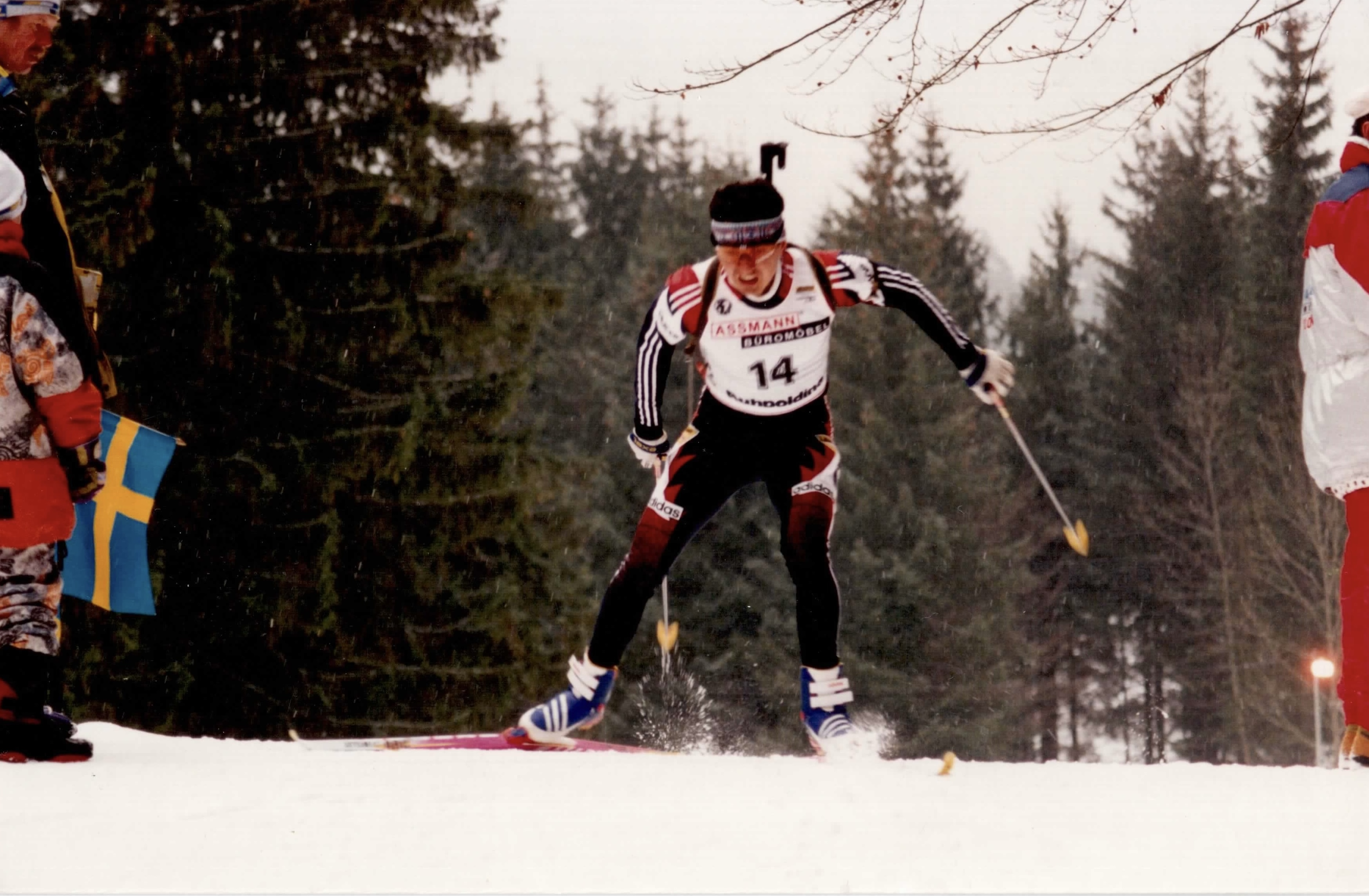
Biathlon WCH 1996 Ruhpolding individual

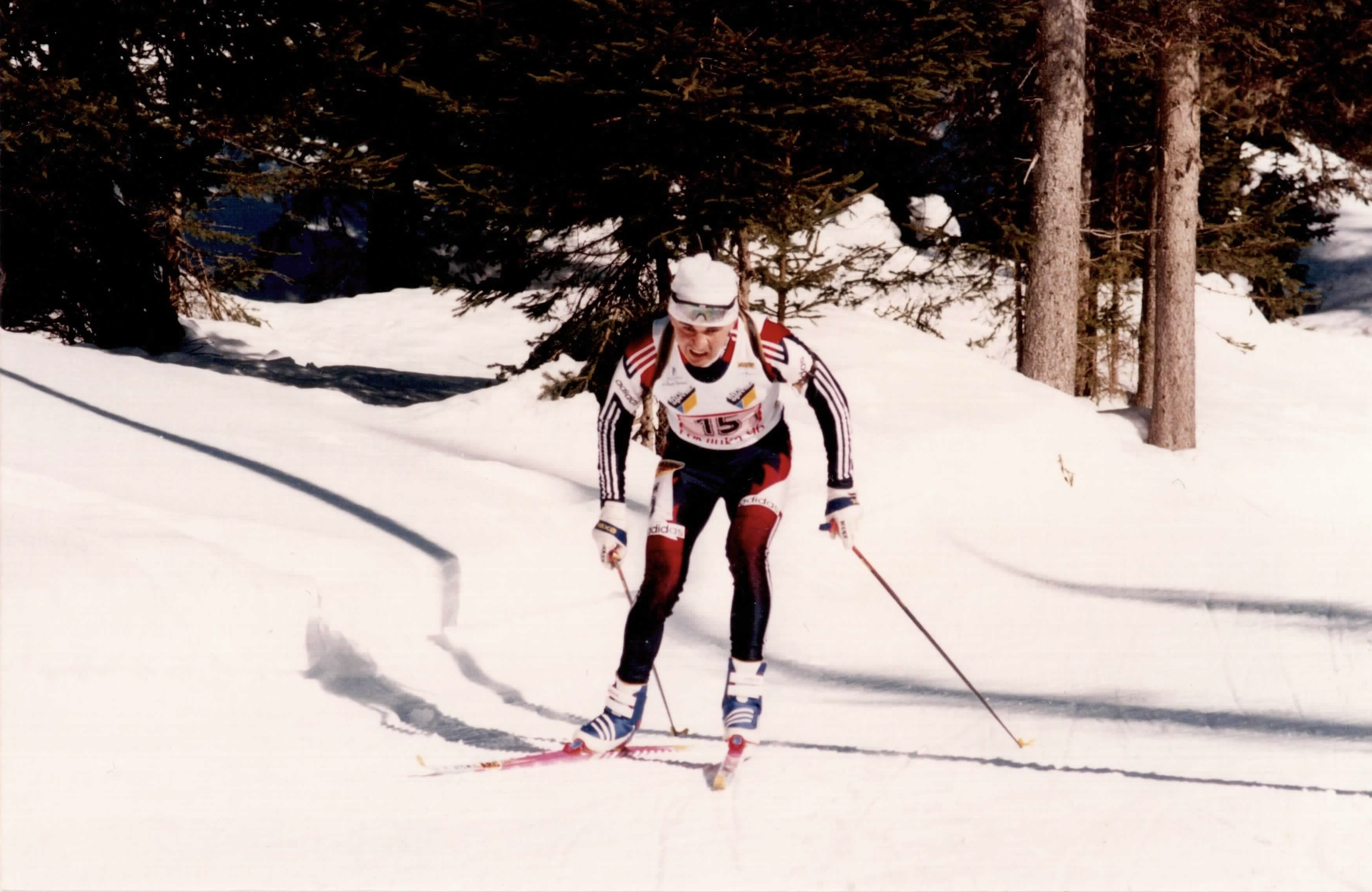
Biathlon World Cup Pokljuka 1996 relay

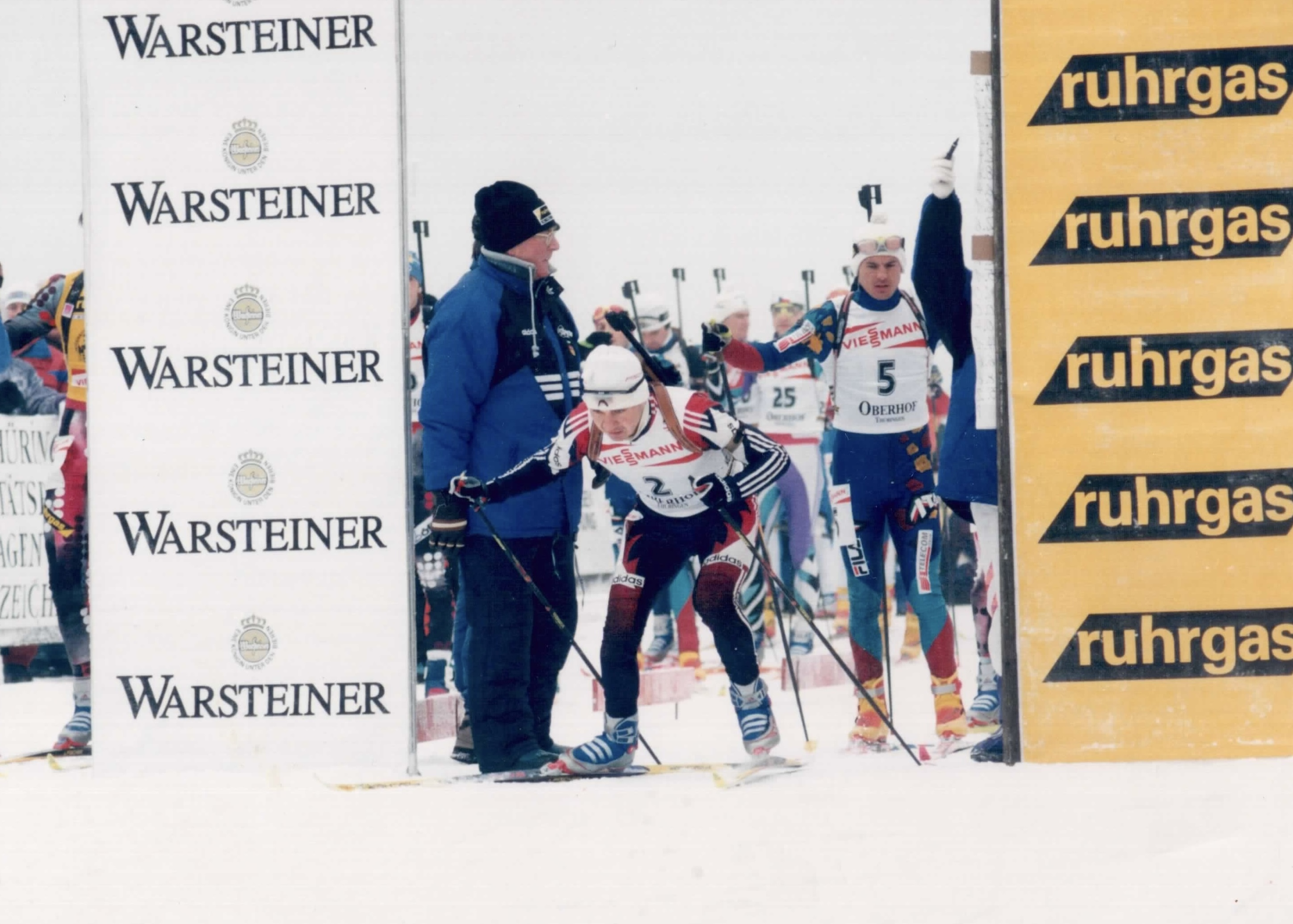
Biathlon World Cup Oberhof 1997

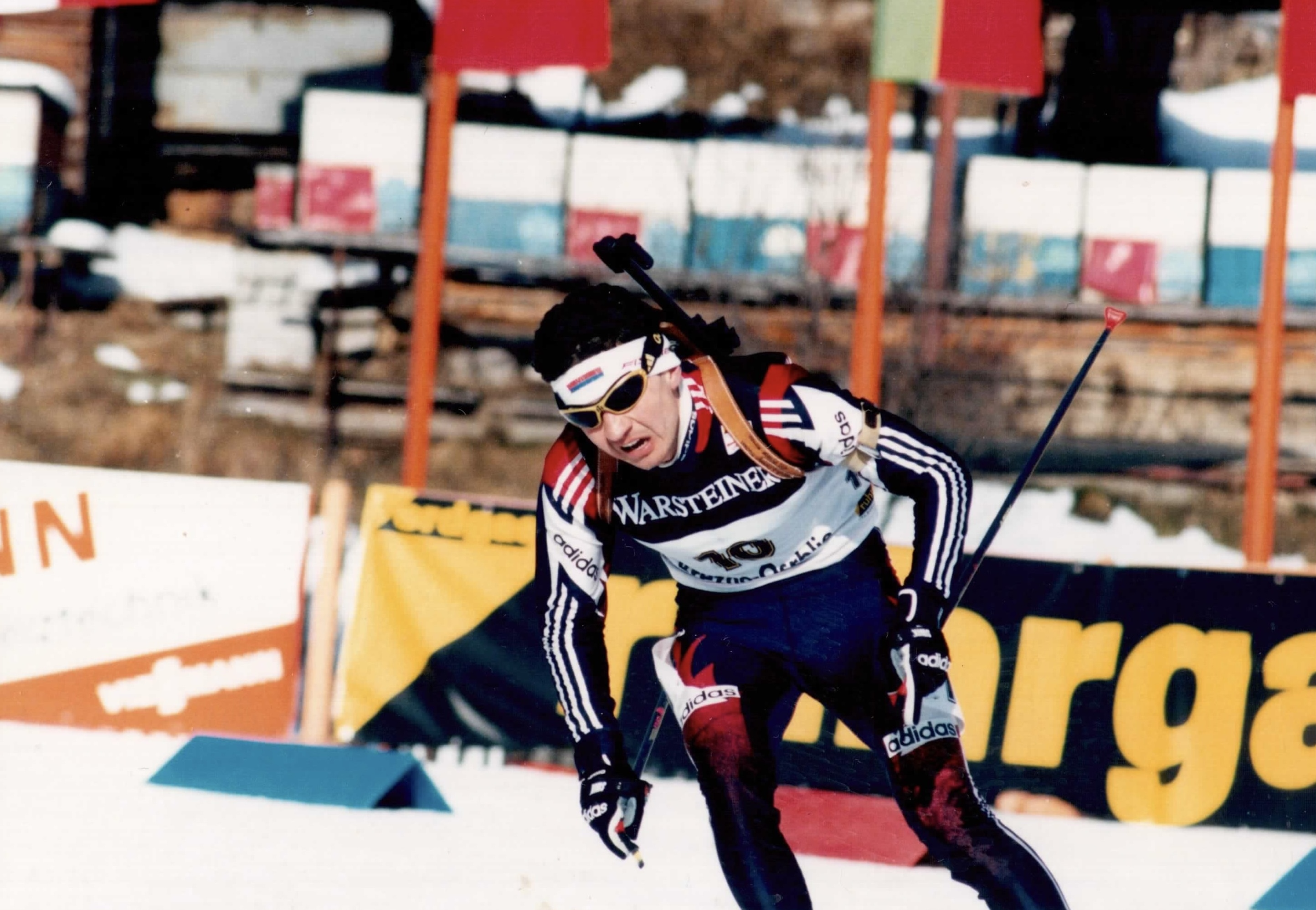
WCH 1997 Brezno-Osrblie individual.

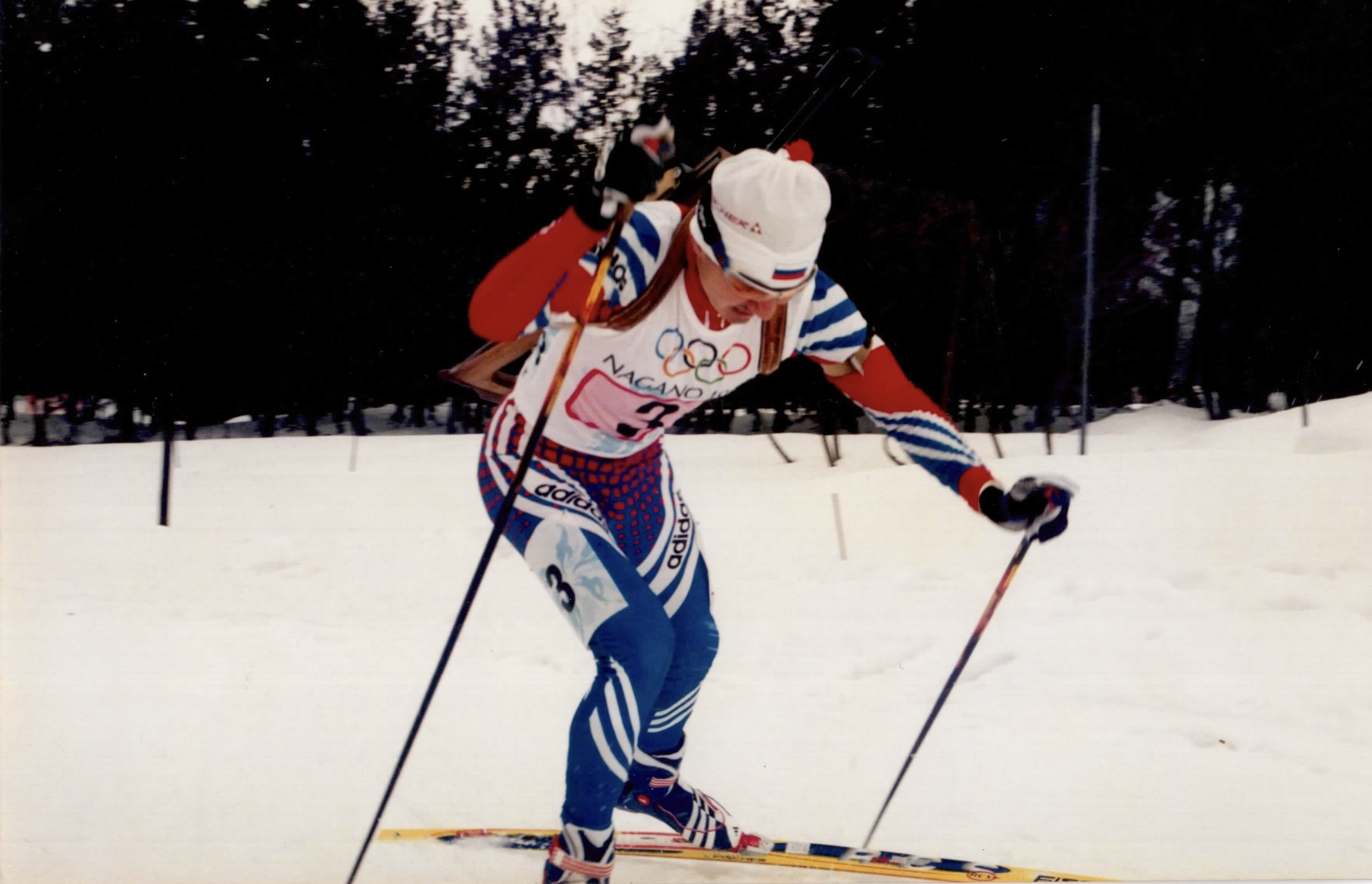
Biathlon Olympic Games 1998 Nagano
