= Victoria Padial =

Spanish biathlete (born 1988)

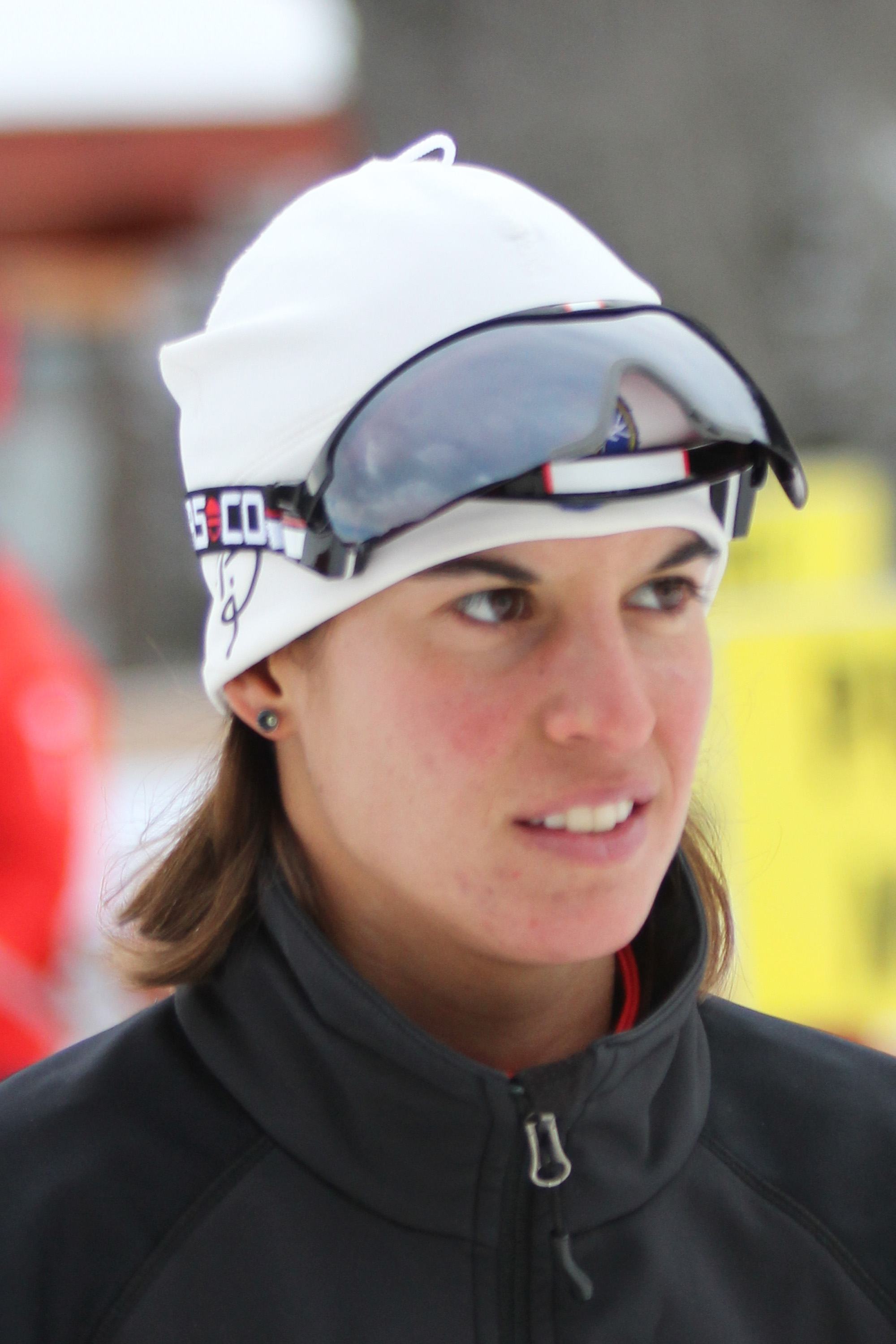
- Padial at Obertilliach in December 2010

Personal information
- Full name: Victoria Padial Hernández
- Born: August 10, 1988 (age 37) Granada, Spain

Sport
- Sport: Skiing
Medal record
Women's biathlon
Representing Spain
European Championships
Silver medal – second place	2014 Nove Mesto	7.5km sprint
Silver medal – second place	2014 Nove Mesto	10km pursuit

Victoria Padial Hernández (born August 10, 1988, in Granada) is a Spanish biathlete.

Padial competed in the 2010 Winter Olympics for Spain. Her best performance was 86th in the individual. She also finished 87th in the sprint.

As of February 2013, her best performance at the Biathlon World Championships is 45th, in the 2013 sprint.

As of February 2013, Padial's best performance in a Biathlon World Cup event is 40th, in the individual at Sochi in 2012/13. She subsequently bettered this in the 2013/14 season when she scored a 20th place in a sprint competition in Pokljuka.

On February 1, 2014, with her silver medal in the 7.5 km sprint, she became the first Spanish biathlete to win a medal in a European Championships. The following day, she won the silver medal in the 10 km pursuit too.

Padial competed in the 2014 Winter Olympics for Spain. Her best performance was 46th in the pursuit. She also finished 52nd in the sprint and 54th in the individual.

== Olympic results ==
Season	Date	Location	Discipline	Place
2010	13 Feb 2010	Vancouver, Canada	Sprint	87th
2010	18 Feb 2010	Vancouver, Canada	Individual	86th
2014	9 Feb 2014	Sochi, Russia	Sprint	52nd
2014	11 Feb 2014	Sochi, Russia	Pursuit	46th
2014	14 Feb 2014	Sochi, Russia	Individual	54th
