= Lilia Vaygina-Efremova =

Ukrainian biathlete (born 1977)

Personal information
- Born: 15 April 1977 (age 49) Cheboksary, Chuvashia, Soviet Union

Sport
- Sport: Skiing
Medal record
Women's Biathlon
Representing Ukraine
Olympic Games
Bronze medal – third place	2006 Turin	7.5 km sprint
European Championships
Representing Russia
Silver medal – second place	2001 Maurienne	10 km pursuit
Silver medal – second place	2001 Maurienne	4 × 6 km relay
Silver medal – second place	2002 Kontiolahti	4 × 6 km relay
Representing Belarus
Bronze medal – third place	2003 Forni Avoltri	4 × 6 km relay
Representing Ukraine
Bronze medal – third place	2008 Nové Město	15 km individual
Representing Russia
Junior World Championships
Gold medal – first place	1997 Forni Avoltri	7.5 km team

Lilia Vaygina-Efremova (born 15 April 1977 in Cheboksary, Chuvashia, Soviet Union) is a Russian (until 2002), Belarusian (from 2002 to 2003) and Ukrainian (since 2003) biathlete.

== Career ==
On 16 February 2006 she won the Winter Olympics bronze medal for the 7.5 km biathlon competition, becoming the first Ukrainian athlete to win a medal at the 2006 Winter Olympics.
