= 2022 IBU Open European Championships =

International biathlon competition

- Venue: Hohenzollern Ski Stadium (de)
- Location: Arber, Germany
- Dates: 26–30 January

The 2022 IBU Open European Championships were held from 26 to 30 January 2022 at the Hohenzollern Ski Stadium at the Großer Arbersee, Germany.

== Schedule ==
All times are local (UTC+1).

Date	Time	Event
26 January	10:15	Men's 20 km individual
26 January	14:00	Women's 15 km individual
28 January	10:30	Men's 10 km sprint
28 January	14:00	Women's 7.5 km sprint
29 January	10:30	Men's 12.5 km pursuit
29 January	13:30	Women's 10 km pursuit
30 January	10:30	4 × 7.5 km M+W mixed relay
30 January	13:30	6 km M + 7.5 km W single mixed relay

== Results ==
=== Men's ===
Event	Gold		Silver		Bronze	
20 km individual details	Sverre Dahlen Aspenes; Norway	51:32.1 (0+0+0+0)	Anton Babikov; Russia	51:43.7 (0+0+0+0)	Matthias Dorfer; Germany	52:41.0 (0+0+0+0)
10 km sprint details	Erlend Bjøntegaard; Norway	26:39.4 (0+0)	Nikita Porshnev; Russia	27:00.0 (0+0)	Lucas Fratzscher; Germany	27:02.3 (0+1)
12.5 km pursuit details	Sverre Dahlen Aspenes; Norway	34:02.1 (1+0+1+1)	Petr Pashchenko; Russia	34:40.2 (1+2+0+2)	Lucas Fratzscher; Germany	34:55.1 (1+1+4+0)

=== Women's ===
Event	Gold		Silver		Bronze	
15 km individual details	Evgeniya Burtasova; Russia	44:22.9 (0+0+0+0)	Alina Stremous; Moldova	44:35.0 (1+0+0+0)	Natalia Gerbulova; Russia	44:39.3 (0+0+0+0)
7.5 km sprint details	Ragnhild Femsteinevik; Norway	21:52.7 (0+0)	Franziska Hildebrand; Germany	21:56.4 (0+0)	Janina Hettich; Germany	22:18.6 (0+1)
10 km pursuit details	Alina Stremous; Moldova	30:39.2 (0+1+2+1)	Janina Hettich; Germany	30:56.9 (0+1+1+3)	Jenny Enodd; Norway	31:06.0 (0+0+2+2)

=== Mixed ===
Event	Gold		Silver		Bronze	
6 km M + 7.5 km W single relay details	Russia Anton Babikov; Evgeniya Burtasova	39:10.5 (0+3) (1+3) (0+0) (0+0) (0+0) (0+1) (0+0) (0+0)	France Émilien Claude; Lou Jeanmonnot	40:11.9 (0+0) (3+3) (0+1) (0+1) (1+3) (0+0) (0+1) (0+1)	Germany Justus Strelow; Franziska Hildebrand	40:44.6 (0+2) (3+3) (0+2) (0+2) (0+2) (0+2) (0+0) (0+1)
4 × 7.5 km M+W relay details	Norway Erlend Bjøntegaard; Johannes Dale; Jenny Enodd; Ragnhild Femsteinevik	1:17:44.9 (0+0) (0+0) (1+3) (0+1) (0+0) (1+3) (0+3) (0+1)	Germany Lucas Fratzscher; Philipp Horn; Janina Hettich; Sophia Schneider	1:18:03.5 (0+2) (1+3) (0+2) (0+1) (0+0) (1+3) (0+0) (0+2)	Switzerland Serafin Wiestner; Martin Jäger; Elisa Gasparin; Aita Gasparin	1:22:38.6 (0+2) (3+3) (1+3) (0+3) (0+0) (0+3) (0+1) (1+3)

== Medal table ==
* Host nation (Germany)

Rank	Nation	Gold	Silver	Bronze	Total
1	Norway	5	0	1	6
2	Russia	2	3	1	6
3	Moldova	1	1	0	2
4	Germany*	0	3	5	8
5	France	0	1	0	1
6	Switzerland	0	0	1	1
Totals (6 entries)		8	8	8	24
