= Biathlon European Championships 2000 =

International biathlon competition

The 7th Biathlon European Championships were held in Zakopane, Poland, from January 26 to January 30, 2000.

There were total of 16 competitions held: sprint, pursuit, individual and relay both for U26 and U21.

== Results ==
=== U26 ===
==== Men's ====
Competition	1st	2nd	3rd
Men's 10 km sprint	(Germany) Andreas Stitzl	(Czech Republic) Ivan Masařík	(Latvia) Oļegs Maļuhins
Men's 12.5 km pursuit	(Poland) Tomasz Sikora	(Germany) Gunar Bretschneider	(Germany) Andreas Stitzl
Men's 20 km individual	(Czech Republic) Zdeněk Vítek	(Germany) Ulf Karkoschka	(Latvia) Ilmārs Bricis
Men's 4 × 7.5 km relay	(Germany) Germany; Gunar Bretschneider; Jan Wüstenfeld; Andreas Stitzl; Ulf Karkoschka	(Poland) Poland; Wiesław Ziemianin; Tomasz Sikora; Krzysztof Topór; Wojciech Kozub	(Russia) Russia; Vladimir Bechterev; Michail Kochkin; Yuriy Batmanov; Pavel Mouslimov

==== Women's ====
Competition	1st	2nd	3rd
Women's 7.5 km sprint	(Poland) Magdalena Gwizdoń	(Poland) Magdalena Grzywa	(Germany) Kati Wilhelm
Women's 10 km pursuit	(Poland) Magdalena Grzywa	(Belarus) Svetlana Paramygina	(Poland) Magdalena Gwizdoń
Women's 15 km individual	(Bulgaria) Iva Karagiozova	(Russia) Olga Romasko	(Germany) Simone Denkinger
Women's 4 × 6 km relay	(Slovakia) Slovakia; Martina Schwarzbacherová; Anna Murínová; Marcela Pavkovčeková; Soňa Mihoková	(Czech Republic) Czech Republic; Kateřina Losmanová; Jitka Pesinová; Irena Česneková; Eva Háková	(Germany) Germany; Peggy Wagenführ; Janet Klein; Simone Denkinger; Kati Wilhelm

=== U21 ===
==== Men's ====
Competition	1st	2nd	3rd
Men's 10 km sprint	(Russia) Nikolay Kruglov Jr.	(Austria) Benjamin Eder	(Ukraine) Roman Pryma
Men's 12.5 km pursuit	(Russia) Nikolay Kruglov Jr.	(Russia) Filip Shulman	(Lithuania) Igoris Ščekočichinas
Men's 20 km individual	(Austria) Benjamin Eder	(Russia) Ivan Cherezov	(Russia) Vitaliy Chernyshov
Men's 4 × 7.5 km relay	(Russia) Russia; Denis Saldimirov; Ivan Cherezov; Vitaliy Chernyshov; Aleksey Churin	(Slovakia) Slovakia; Roman Regúly; Matej Kazár; Matúš Goč; Dušan Šimočko	(Czech Republic) Czech Republic; Jiři Faltus; Jaroslav Soukup; Milan Faltus; David Kristejn

==== Women's ====
Competition	1st	2nd	3rd
Women's 7.5 km sprint	(Belarus) Ekaterina Grigorieva	(Russia) Irina Fomina	(Belarus) Svetlana Dirko Chandogina
Women's 10 km pursuit	(Ukraine) Oksana Yakovleva	(Belarus) Ekaterina Grigorieva	(Russia) Irina Fomina
Women's 15 km individual	(Russia) Elena Khrustaleva	(Norway) Tora Berger	(Czech Republic) Jana Pesková
Women's 3 × 6 km relay	(Russia) Russia; Yuliya Makarova; Irina Fomina; Elena Khrustaleva	(Belarus) Belarus; Svetlana Dirko Chandogina; Lyudmila Ananko; Ekaterina Grigorieva	(Poland) Poland; Katarzyna Ponikwia; Bernadetta Bednarz; Beata Kiełtyka

== Medal table ==
№	Country	Gold	Silver	Bronze	Total
1	Russia	5	4	3	12
2	Poland	3	2	2	7
3	Germany	2	2	4	8
4	Belarus	1	3	1	5
5	Czech Republic	1	2	2	5
6	Austria	1	1		2
6	Slovakia	1	1		2
8	Ukraine	1		1	2
9	Bulgaria	1			1
10	Norway		1		1
11	Latvia			2	2
12	Lithuania			1	1
