= Biathlon European Championships 1999 =

International biathlon competition

The 6th Biathlon European Championships were held in Izhevsk, Russia, from February 1 to February 7, 1999.

8 competitions were held: sprint, individual and relays both for U26 men and women; individual for both junior men and women.

== Results ==
=== U26 ===
==== Men's ====
Competition	1st	2nd	3rd
Men's 10 km sprint	(Germany) Alexander Wolf	(Czech Republic) Roman Dostál	(Belarus) Rustam Valiullin
Men's 20 km individual	(Russia) Sergei Konovalov	(Germany) Ulf Karkoschka	(Norway) Terje Aune
Men's 4 × 7.5 km relay	(Germany) Germany; Ulf Karkoschka; Michael Greis; Stefan Hodde; Alexander Wolf	(Russia) Russia; Aleksey Kobelev; Sergei Konovalov; Eduard Riabov; Pavel Mouslimov	(Belarus) Belarus; Alexandr Syman; Sergey Novikov; Rustam Valiullin; Alexey Morzhakin

==== Women's ====
Competition	1st	2nd	3rd
Women's 7.5 km sprint	(Russia) Natalya Sokolova	(Belarus) Lyudmila Lysenko	(Ukraine) Oksana Khvostenko
Women's 15 km individual	(Germany) Kathi Swaab	(Russia) Natalya Sokolova	(Belarus) Lyudmila Lysenko
Women's 4 × 6 km relay	(Russia) Russia; Svetlana Tchernousova; Natalya Sokolova; Irina Bykova; Irina Yazhkova	(Poland) Poland; Iwona Grzywa; Aldona Sobczyk; Iwona Daniluk; Patrycja Szymura	(Norway) Norway; Arna Kolveit; Åse Idland; Ann Helen Grande; Borghild Ouren

=== Junior ===
==== Men's ====
Competition	1st	2nd	3rd
Men's 20 km individual	(Russia) Viktor Gain	(Russia) Maxim Maksimov	(Czech Republic) Jiři Faltus

==== Women's ====
Competition	1st	2nd	3rd
Women's 15 km individual	(Poland) Magdalena Grzywa	(Russia) Irina Fomina	(Russia) Anna Bogaliy

== Medal table ==
No.	Country	Gold	Silver	Bronze	Total
1	Russia	4	4	1	9
2	Germany	3	1	0	4
3	Poland	1	1	0	2
4	Belarus	0	1	3	4
5	Czech Republic	0	1	1	2
6	Norway	0	0	2	2
7	Ukraine	0	0	1	1
