= Nina Lemesh =

Ukrainian biathlete (born 1973)

Olympic medal record

Women's biathlon

Representing Ukraine

World Championships
Silver medal – second place	1996 Ruhpolding	Team event
Bronze medal – third place	2000 Oslo	4 × 7.5 km relay
Bronze medal – third place	2001 Pokljuka	4 × 7.5 km relay

European Championships
Gold medal – first place	2006 Langdorf	7.5 km sprint
Silver medal – second place	1995 Le Grand-Bornand	3 × 6 km relay
Silver medal – second place	1995 Le Grand-Bornand	15 km individual
Silver medal – second place	2005 Novosibirsk	4 x 6 km relay
Bronze medal – third place	2001 Maurienne	4 × 6 km relay
Bronze medal – third place	2002 Kontiolahti	4 × 6 km relay

Nina Lemesh (Ukrainian: Ніна Лемеш; born May 31, 1973, in Chernihiv) is a retired Ukrainian biathlete.

In 2020, she became deputy Minister of Youth and Sports of Ukraine.

== Career ==
- World Championships
- 2000 - Bronze medal on the relay
- 2001 - Bronze medal on the relay
