= Jan Wüstenfeld =

German biathlete (born 1975)

Personal information
- Full name: Jan Christoph Wüstenfeld
- Nationality: German
- Born: 26 June 1975 (age 51) Hanover, Lower Saxony, Germany
- Height: 184 cm (6 ft 0 in)
- Weight: 76 kg (168 lb)
- Spouse: Katja Wüstenfeld (née Beer)
Medal record
Men's biathlon
Representing Germany
European Championships
First place	2000 Zakopane	4 × 7.5 km relay

Jan Christoph Wüstenfeld (born 26 June 1975) is a German biathlete. He competed in the men's 20 km individual event at the 1998 Winter Olympics.

Wüstenfeld married German biathlete Katja Beer in 2010.

== Biathlon results ==
All results are sourced from the International Biathlon Union.

=== Olympic Games ===
Event	Individual	Sprint	Relay
(Japan) 1998 Nagano	32nd	—	—

=== Individual victories ===
1 victories (1 Sp)

Season	Date	Location	Discipline	Level
1997–98; 1 victory (1 In)	18 December 1997	(Finland) Kontiolahti	10 km sprint	Biathlon World Cup

*Results are from UIPMB and IBU races which include the Biathlon World Cup, Biathlon World Championships and the Winter Olympic Games.
