= Biathlon European Championships 1997 =

International biathlon competition

The 4th Biathlon European Championships were held in Windischgarsten, Austria. Six competitions were held for athletes U26: sprint, individual and relays.

== Results ==
=== U26 ===
==== Men's ====
Competition	1st	2nd	3rd
Men's 10 km sprint	(Russia) Andrei Padin	(Slovenia) Jože Poklukar	(Slovenia) Tomaž Globočnik
Men's 20 km individual	(Russia) Sergei Rozhkov	(Poland) Tomasz Sikora	(Germany) Marco Morgenstern
Men's 4 × 7.5 km relay	(Germany) Germany; Ulf Karkoschka; Holger Schönthier; Lars Kreuzer; Marco Morgenstern	(Russia) Russia; Vladimir Bejterev; Andrei Padin; Alexei Sidorov; Eduard Riabov	(Norway) Norway; Stig-Are Eriksen; Kjetil Sæter; Lars-Sigve Oftedal; Kjell Ove Oftedal

==== Women's ====
Competition	1st	2nd	3rd
Women's 7.5 km sprint	(Poland) Anna Stera	(Russia) Tatiana Martynova	(Italy) Natalie Santer
Women's 15 km individual	(Germany) Katja Beer	(Russia) Albina Akhatova	(Slovakia) Soňa Mihoková
Women's 3 × 6 km relay	(Russia) Russia; Irina Malgina; Tatiana Martynowa; Albina Akhatova	(Germany) Germany; Katja Beer; Janet Klein; Steffi Kindt	(Czech Republic) Czech Republic; Irena Madlová; Jitka Simunková; Irena Tomšová

== Medal table ==
No.	Country	Gold	Silver	Bronze	Total
1	Russia	3	3	0	6
2	Germany	2	1	1	4
3	Poland	1	1	0	2
4	Slovenia	0	1	1	2
5	Czech Republic	0	0	1	1
5	Italy	0	0	1	1
5	Norway	0	0	1	1
5	Slovakia	0	0	1	1
