= Alina Stremous =

Russian-Moldovan biathlete (born 1995)

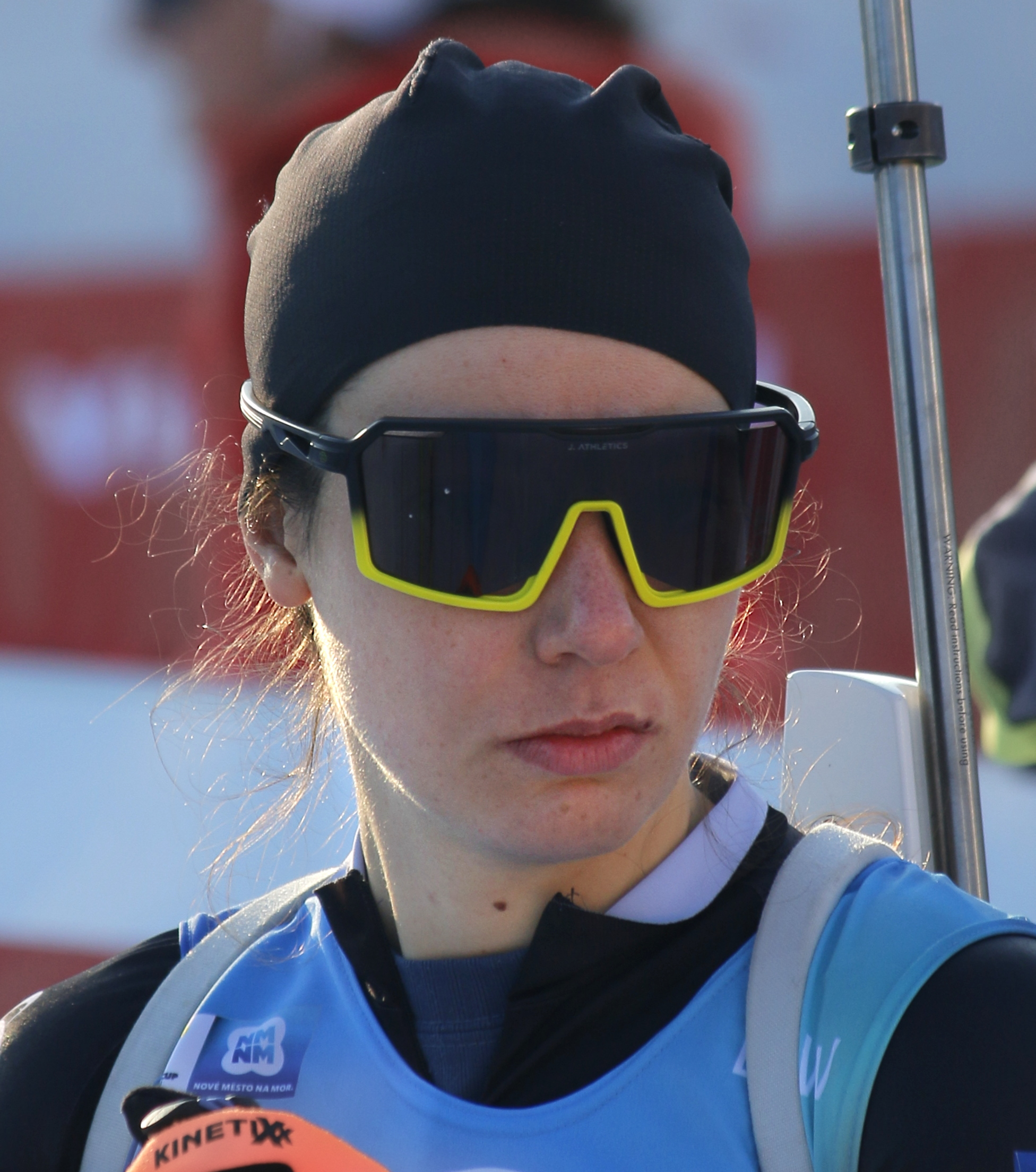
- Stremous in 2023

Personal information
- Native name: Алина Стремоус
- Born: 11 July 1995 (age 31) Kotelnikovo, Russia

Sport

Olympic Games
- Teams: 1

European/IBU Cup
- Individual victories: 1
- Individual podiums: 2
Medal record
Women's biathlon
Representing Moldova
European Championships
| Gold medal – first place | 2022 Arber | 10 km pursuit |
| Silver medal – second place | 2022 Arber | 15 km individual |
| Silver medal – second place | 2024 Osrblie | 15 km individual |

Alina Stremous (born 11 July 1995) is a Russian-born Moldovan biathlete who competed at the 2022 Winter Olympics. She won the 10 km pursuit event at the 2022 IBU Open European Championships, and finished second in the 15 km individual events at the 2022 and 2024 IBU Open European Championships.

== Personal life ==
Stremous was born in Kotelnikovo, Russia. She studied at State Budgetary Secondary School No. 3, Saint Petersburg.

== Career ==
Stremous started cross-country skiing in Volgograd, Russia, and later moved to Saint Petersburg. In 2017, she started competing for the St. Petersburg Biathlon Sports Federation. She made her international debut in the 2019–20 Biathlon IBU Cup event in Minsk, Belarus. In April 2020, Stremous started competing for Moldova, as she had been unable to make the Russian reserve team. She had not competed internationally for Russia, and so did not need permission from the Russian Biathlon Union to make the nationality change. She was one of several Russian-born athletes who chose to represent Moldova.

Stremous came fourth in the 2020–21 Biathlon IBU Cup event in Arber, Germany. At the 2022 IBU Open European Championships, she won the 10 km pursuit event, by 18 seconds. She had four penalties in the competition. At the same Championships, she came second in the 15 km individual event, and fourth in the 7.5 km sprint race.

Stremous qualified for the 2022 Winter Olympics; she was one of four Moldovan biathletes at the Games. She came 10th in the women's sprint event and 16th in the pursuit race. She missed two of her 10 targets in the pursuit race. She also finished 37th in the 15km individual event, and was the country's flag bearer at the closing ceremony.

Stremous came second in the 15 km individual event at the 2024 IBU Open European Championships. In 2025, Stremous came third in the German Biathlon Summer Championships, as a guest athlete.

Stremous was one of five Moldovans selected for the 2026 Winter Olympics.

== Career results ==
=== Olympic Games ===
0 medals

| Event | Individual | Sprint | Pursuit | Mass start | Relay | Mixed relay |
|---|---|---|---|---|---|---|
| (China) 2022 Beijing | 37th | 10th | 16th | 30th | — | — |
| (Italy) 2026 Milano Cortina | 14th | 73rd | — | — | — | — |

=== World Championships ===
0 medals

| Event | Individual | Sprint | Pursuit | Mass start | Relay | Mixed relay | Single mixed relay |
|---|---|---|---|---|---|---|---|
| (Slovenia) 2021 Pokljuka | 72nd | 53rd | 54th | — | — | 22nd | — |
| (Germany) 2023 Oberhof | 41st | 63rd | — | — | — | 23rd | 8th |
| (Switzerland) 2025 Lenzerheide | 48th | 67th | — | — | — | 18th | 12th |
