= Oksana Khvostenko =

Ukrainian biathlete (born 1977)

Medal record

Women's biathlon

Representing Ukraine

World Championships
Silver medal – second place	2003 Khanty-Mansiysk	4 × 6 km relay
Silver medal – second place	2008 Östersund	4 × 6 km relay
Bronze medal – third place	2008 Östersund	15 km individual
Bronze medal – third place	2008 Östersund	7.5 km sprint

European Championships
Gold medal – first place	2005 Novosibirsk	10 km pursuit
Gold medal – first place	2008 Nové Město	4 × 6 km relay
Silver medal – second place	2005 Novosibirsk	4 x 6 km relay
Bronze medal – third place	1999 Izhevsk	7.5 km sprint
Bronze medal – third place	2001 Maurienne	4 × 6 km relay
Bronze medal – third place	2002 Kontiolahti	4 × 6 km relay

Winter Universiade
Gold medal – first place	2003 Tarvisio	10 km pursuit
Gold medal – first place	2003 Tarvisio	12.5 km mass start
Gold medal – first place	2005 Innsbruck	12.5 km mass start
Gold medal – first place	2005 Innsbruck	Relay
Silver medal – second place	2003 Tarvisio	Relay
Silver medal – second place	2005 Innsbruck	7.5 km sprint
Silver medal – second place	2005 Innsbruck	10 km pursuit
Bronze medal – third place	2001 Zakopane	Relay

Oksana Khvostenko (Ukrainian: Оксана Юріївна Хвостенко) (born 27 November 1977 in Chernihiv) is a Ukrainian biathlete. She is a multiple medalist at the World Championships. In 2008 together with Andriy Deryzemlya she won World Team Challenge.

== Anti-doping rule violation ==
Khvostenko tested positive for ephedrine at a post event doping control at the Biathlon World Championships 2011 where the Ukrainian team had finished second in the Women's Relay. The team was later disqualified because of the anti-doping rule violation and Khvostenko received a one-year ban from sport, commencing on 13 March 2011.

== Personal life ==
Since 2001, she is married to Ukrainian biathlete Vyacheslav Derkach.

== Career ==
- World Championships
- 2003 - Silver medal on the relay
- 2008 - Bronze medal, Sprint
- 2008 - Bronze medal, Individual
- 2008 - Silver medal on the relay
