= Oleksiy Korobeinikov =

Ukrainian biathlete (1978–2014)

Personal information
- Nationality: Ukrainian
- Born: 12 May 1978 Achinsk, Russian SFSR, Soviet Union
- Died: 16 May 2014 (aged 36) Krasnoyarsk, Russia

Sport
- Sport: Biathlon
Medal record
Men's biathlon
Representing Ukraine
European Championships
Gold medal – first place	2003 Forni Avoltri	10 km sprint
Silver medal – second place	2005 Novosibirsk	4 x 7.5 km relay
Bronze medal – third place	2007 Bansko	20 km individual
Winter Universiade
Silver medal – second place	2003 Tarvisio	12.5 km pursuit
Silver medal – second place	2005 Innsbruck	Relay
Bronze medal – third place	2003 Tarvisio	20 km individual
Bronze medal – third place	2003 Tarvisio	Relay
Representing Russia
Junior World Championships
Gold medal – first place	1997 Forni Avoltri	10 km team
Silver medal – second place	1998 Jericho/Valcartier	Relay

Oleksiy Korobeinikov (12 May 1978 – 16 May 2014) was a Ukrainian biathlete. He competed in the men's 20 km individual event at the 2006 Winter Olympics.
