= Günther Beck =

West German slalom canoeist

Medal record

Men's canoe slalom

Representing West Germany

World Championships
Gold medal – first place	1957 Augsburg	C1 team

Günther Beck is a West German former slalom canoeist who competed in the 1950s and the 1960s. He won a gold medal in the C1 team event at the 1957 ICF Canoe Slalom World Championships in Augsburg.
