= Katja Wüstenfeld =

German biathlete (born 1976)

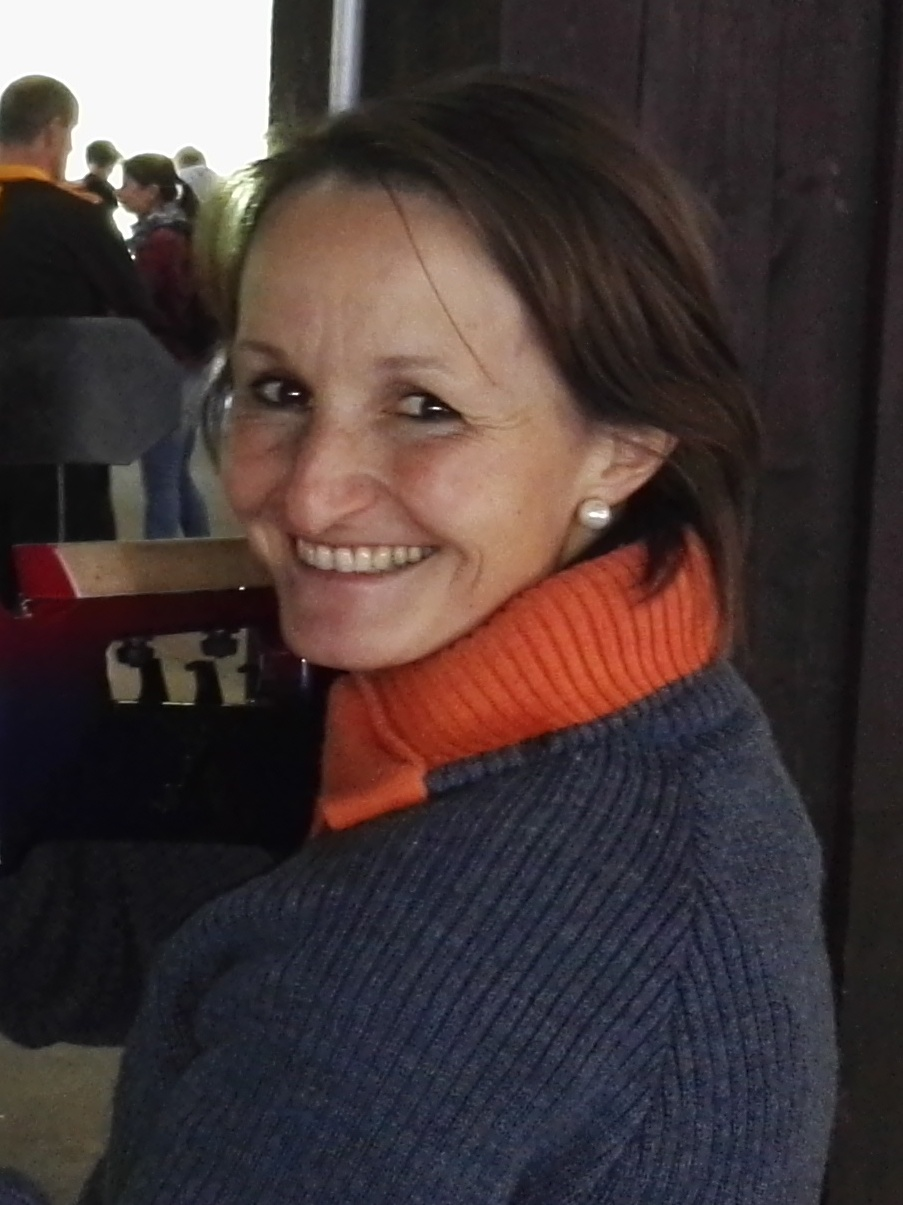
- Katja Wüstenfeld in 2016

Personal information
- Full name: Katja Wüstenfeld
- Nationality: German
- Born: Katja Beer; 10 October 1976 (age 49) Dohna, Saxony, East Germany
- Height: 165 cm (5 ft 5 in)
- Weight: 51 kg (112 lb)
- Spouse: Jan Wüstenfeld
- Parent: Manfred Beer (father)
Medal record
Women's biathlon
Representing Germany
European Championships
First place	2001 Maurienne	7.5 km sprint
First place	2001 Maurienne	10 km pursuit
First place	2001 Maurienne	4 × 6 km relay
First place	1997 Windischgarsten	15 km individual
Second place	1997 Windischgarsten	3 × 6 km relay

Katja Wüstenfeld (née Beer; born 10 October 1976) is a German former biathlete. Beer competed in the women's individual event at the 1998 Winter Olympics.

Her father Manfred Beer was a biathlete who earned a bronze medal for East Germany at the 1976 Winter Olympics. Katja married German biathlete Jan Wüstenfeld in 2010.
