= Großer Arbersee =

Lake in Germany

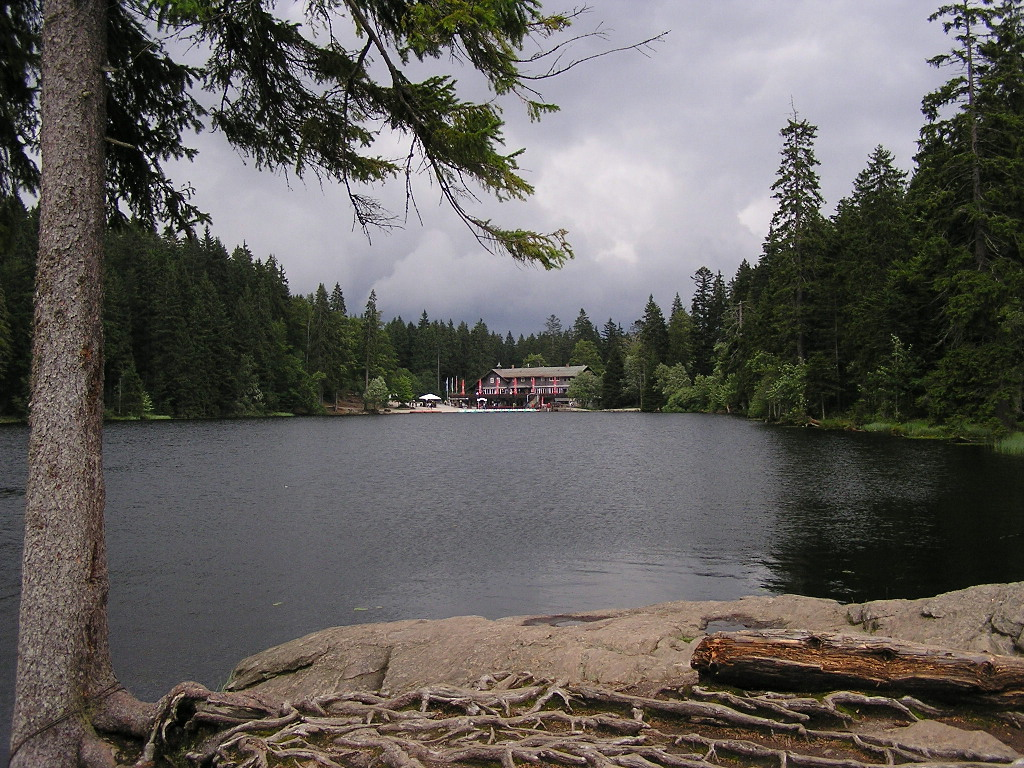

- Location within Bavaria
- Location: Bavarian Forest, Bavaria
- Coordinates: 49°05′55″N 13°09′18″E
- Primary inflows: Geigenbach
- Primary outflows: Seebach
- Catchment area: 2.58 km^{2} (1.00 sq mi)
- Basin countries: Germany
- Max. length: 550 m (1,800 ft)
- Max. width: 260 m (850 ft)
- Surface area: 7.7 ha (19 acres)
- Average depth: 5.8 m (19 ft)
- Max. depth: 16 m (52 ft)
- Water volume: 450,000 m^{3} (16,000,000 cu ft)
- Surface elevation: 935 m (3,068 ft)

Großer Arbersee is a lake in the Bavarian Forest, Bavaria, Germany. It lies at an elevation of 935 metres and has a surface area of 7.7 hectares.
