= Igor Khokhryakov =

Belarusian biathlete (born 1965)

Personal information
- Nationality: Belarusian
- Born: 25 January 1965 (age 60); Chusovoy, Russian SFSR, Soviet Union

Sport
- Sport: Biathlon

Igor Khokhryakov (born 25 January 1965) is a Belarusian biathlete. He competed in the men's sprint event at the 1994 Winter Olympics.
