= Langdorf =

- Municipality
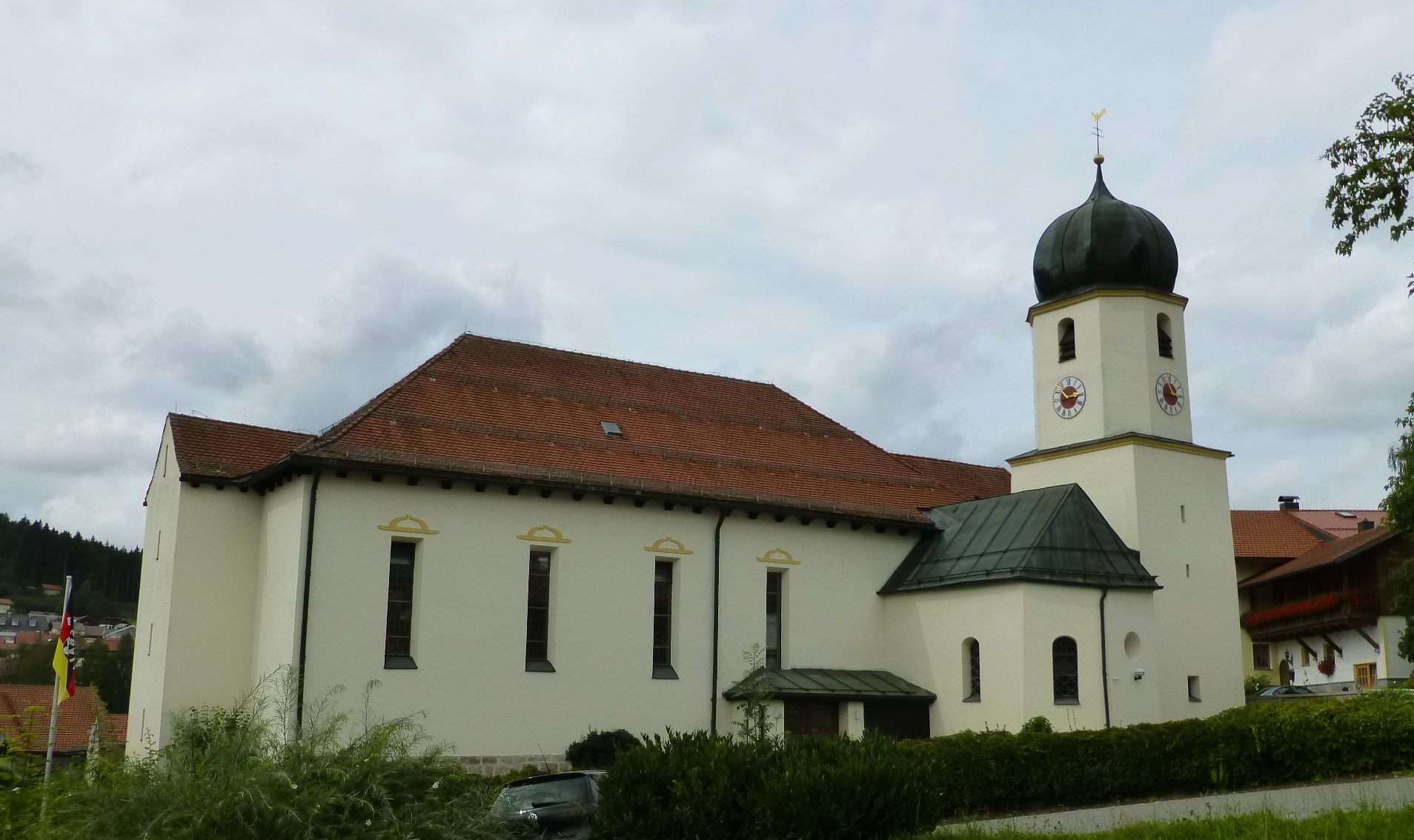
- Catholic Church St. Maria Magdalena

- Coat of arms

- Location of Langdorf within Regen district
- Interactive map of Langdorf
- Location within Germany Location within Bavaria
- Coordinates: 49°1′N 13°9′E
- Country: Germany
- State: Bavaria
- Admin. region: Niederbayern
- District: Regen

Government
  - Mayor (2020–26): Michael Englram (CSU)

Area
  - Total: 34.35 km^{2} (13.26 sq mi)
- Elevation: 645 m (2,116 ft)

Population (2025-12-31)
  - Total: 1,815
  - Density: 52.84/km^{2} (136.9/sq mi)
- Time zone: UTC+01:00 (CET)
  - Summer (DST): UTC+02:00 (CEST)
- Postal codes: 94264
- Dialling codes: 09921
- Vehicle registration: REG
- Website: www.langdorf.de

Langdorf (German pronunciation: [ˈlaŋdɔʁf]) is a municipality in the district of Regen in Bavaria in Germany. It was formerly known as Dorfmuri.
