= Ekaterina Vinogradova =

American biathlete

Personal information
- Full name: Ekaterina Vinogradova
- Born: 3 September 1977 (age 48) Novosibirsk, USSR
- Height: 1.68 m (5 ft 6 in)

Sport
- Sport: Skiing
- Club: Dinamo Minsk; Auburn Ski Club

World Cup career
- Seasons: 1997–
- Indiv. podiums: 4
- Indiv. wins: 1
Medal record
Women's biathlon
Representing Belarus
World Championships
| Bronze medal – third place | 2004 Oberhof | 7.5 km sprint |
| Bronze medal – third place | 2005 Hochfilzen | Relay 4 x 6 km |
Representing Russia
Junior World Championships
| Gold medal – first place | 1997 Forni Avoltri | 7.5 km team |
| Bronze medal – third place | 1997 Forni Avoltri | 3 × 7.5 km relay |
- Updated on February 6, 2011

Ekaterina Vinogradova (née Ivanova) (Belarusian: Кацярына Іванова, Russian: Екатерина Геннадьевна Иванова, Armenian: Եկատերինա Վինոգրադովա, Ekaterina G. Ivanova) (born September 3, 1977 in Novosibirsk) is a Russian-born biathlete and cross-country skier. She competed for Belarus, then for the United States and now competes for Armenia.

== Career ==
Ekaterina Vinogradova, coached by Sergey Vinogradov and starts for Dinamo Minsk, lives in California's Auburn and operated since 1993. In 2003, she was promoted to the Belarus national team and began her international career at the European Championships in Forni Avoltri. Here she won gold in the pursuit and bronze in the sprint and the relay. A year later in Minsk, she won silver in the pursuit and in the relay, 2005 in Langdorf again in the relay gold. Vinogradova also debuted in 2003 in a sprint race in the Biathlon World Cup and was already in the first race in decades in Kontiolahti. At the next World Cup stop in Hochfilzen, she won with the white Russian squadron. Their best finish was two third places in the sprint at the World Cup once in 2004 in Oberhof, Germany, a second time in 2006 on Holmenkollen in Oslo. The 2003/04 season they finished in 17th, 2005/06 in 20th from the overall World Cup.

Vinogradova is competed on World Championships in 2003 in Khanty-Mansiysk, 2004 in Oberhof and 2005 in Hochfilzen part. At World Championships Vinogradova was often in top form. In 2003, she was 11th in a single, 15th in the sprint, ninth in the pursuit and fourth in the relay. The following year she won at the same time the German Martina Glagow, the bronze medal in the sprint, was sixth in the pursuit and once again fourth in the relay. In Hochfilzen they eventually won bronze in the relay again. Vinogradova also took to the 2006 Winter Olympics participate in Turin. In the individual race they could not achieve significant results, with the season, she missed a medal in fourth place but only just.

In addition to the Olympic biathlon Vinogradova also competes in Summer Biathlon. She took 2003 Avoltri Forni, 2004 in Osrblie and 2005 Muonio in world championships and won gold in all three years with the squadron. More medals, she missed in 2005 as fourth in the sprint and pursuit and fifth in the mass start only barely.

Vinogradova lives in the Auburn in the United States and is also active there as biathlete and cross-country skier. At the University of Vermont, she completed her Bachelor of Science. It starts for the Auburn Ski Club. They played their first international cross-country races in 1999 and immediately gained in Quebec her first two races over 10 km freestyle and 5 km Classic. So far, they won ten races of the FIS and the Continental Cup. In 2004, she made her debut in Düsseldorf in the Cross-country skiing World Cup and became the 19th their first World Cup points. At the highest level, it was not for the U.S., but for Belarus. The following year she started at the same race, but missed as the 35th more points. In 2009, she won the Highlands Nordic in the mixed championships of Americans and Canadians over 5 km freestyle silver and bronze on the 30-kilometer freestyle distance. Vinogradova reached in biathlon at the North America Championships Biathlon 2008 in Itasca very good results. She won the pursuit race and the mass start.

Vinogradova since the 2006-07 season, no longer was used internationally, she celebrated her international comeback in the 2010-11 and now starts for Armenia. First, they took part to achieve without significant results at the IBU Cup, in Presque Isle contest after five years a World Cup race and was on 50th place.

== Cross-country skiing results ==
All results are sourced from the International Ski Federation (FIS).

=== World Cup ===
==== Season standings ====
| Season | Age | | | |
| Season | Age | Overall | Distance | Sprint |
|---|---|---|---|---|
| 2005 | 27 | 79 | — | 55 |
| 2006 | 28 | NC | — | NC |
