= Lenka Faltusová =

Czech biathlete (born 1979)

Personal information
- Nationality: Czech
- Born: 24 June 1979 (age 47) Lanškroun, Czechoslovakia

Sport
- Sport: Biathlon
Medal record
Women's biathlon
Representing Czech Republic
Junior World Championships
Bronze medal – third place	1998 Jericho/Valcartier	Team

Lenka Faltusová (born 24 June 1979) is a Czech former biathlete. She competed in three events at the 2006 Winter Olympics.
