= Zdeňka Vejnarová =

Czech biathlete (born 1981)

Personal information
- Born: 22 June 1981 (age 45) Jilemnice, Czechoslovakia

Sport
- Sport: Skiing
Medal record
Women's biathlon
Representing Czech Republic
Junior World Championships
Silver medal – second place	2001 Khanty-Mansiysk	3 × 7.5 km relay
- Updated on 28 February 2013

Zdeňka Vejnarová (born in Jilemnice on 22 June 1981) is a Czech biathlete.

Vejnarová competed in the 2002, 2006 and 2010 Winter Olympics for the Czech Republic. Her best performance was 13th, as part of the 2006 Czech relay team. Her best individual performance was 23rd, in the 2002 individual. In 2006, she finished 43rd in the sprint, 35th in the pursuit and 53rd in the individual. In 2010, she finished 60th in the sprint, 55th in the pursuit and the individual, as well as 16th in the relay.

As of February 2013, her best performance at the Biathlon World Championships is 8th, as part of the 2007 Czech mixed relay team. Her best individual performance is 16th, in the 2003 pursuit.

As of February 2013, Vejnarová's best performance in the Biathlon World Cup is 5th, as part of the women's relay team at Holmenkollen in 2002–03. Her best individual result is 7th, in the individual race at Hochfilzen in 2005–06. Her best overall finish in the Biathlon World Cup is 43rd, in 2007–08.
