= Natalya Sokolova (biathlete) =

Russian biathlete (born 1973)

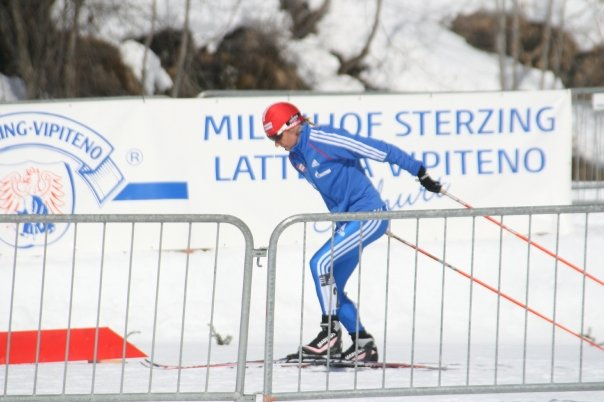
Natalia Sokolova at IBU-Cup Ridnaun in 2009

Natalya Sokolova (Russian: Наталья Соколова, born 23 October 1973, Chelyabinsk, Russian SFSR) is a biathlete who has represented Belarus since the start of the 2004–05 season. With Russia, she has won a relay gold medal at the European Championships, and she has also won an individual European gold medal and finished on the podium in a World Cup race once, with a third place in a pursuit race in Pokljuka. She is ranked 18th in the Biathlon World Cup 2006–07 season, which is her first top-30 rank in the World Cup standings. Her best placing at the World Championships is 34th at the individual event in 2007.
