= Martina Halinárová =

Slovak biathlete (born 1973)

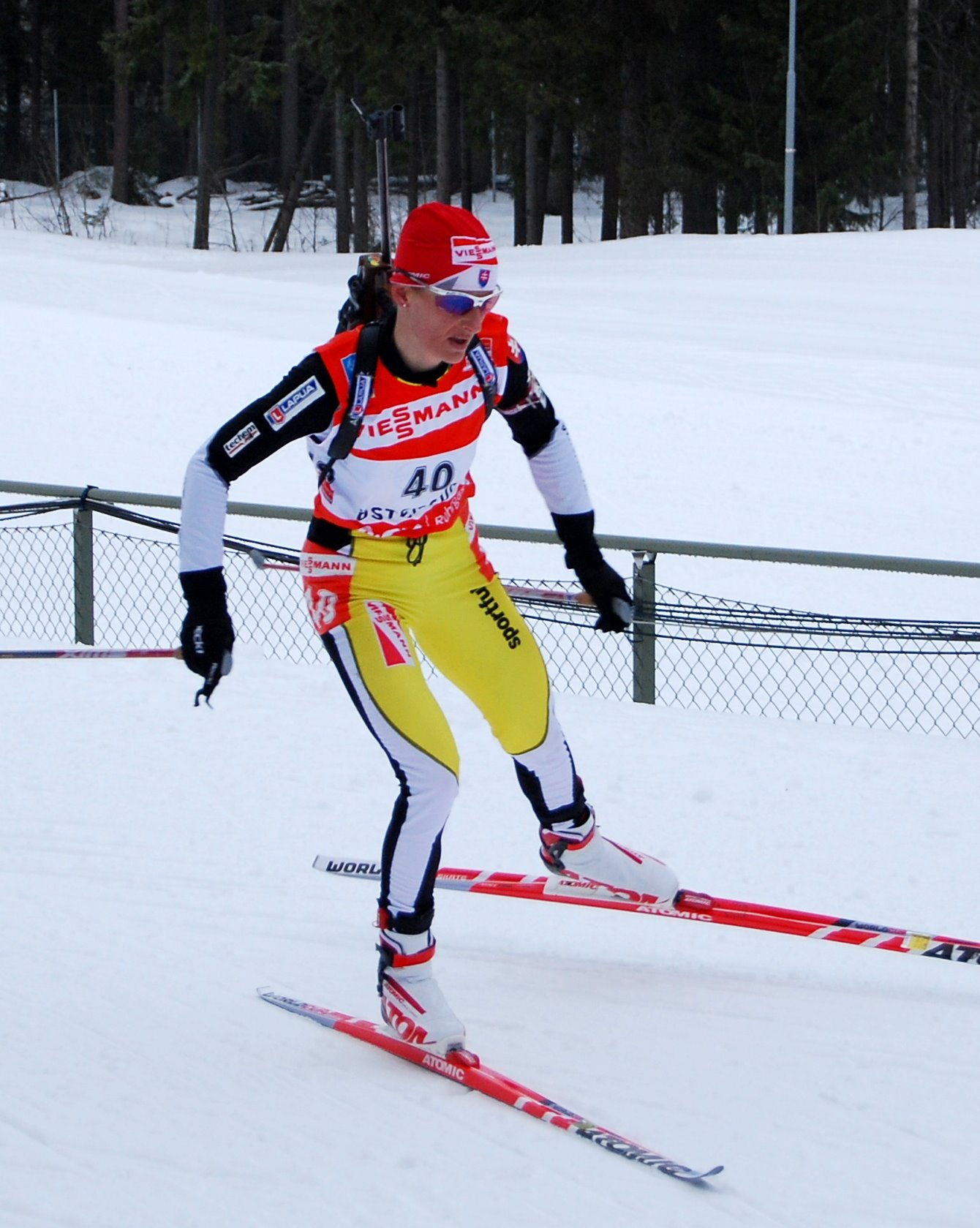
- Halinárová at the 2008 World Championships in Östersund

Personal information
- Born: Martina Jašicová; 22 April 1973 (age 53) Dolný Kubín, Czechoslovakia

Sport
- Country: Slovakia

Professional information
- Club: Dukla Banská Bystrica

Olympic Games
- Teams: 5 (1994–2010)

World Championships
- Medals: 1
Medal record
Women's biathlon
World championship
Silver medal – second place	1999 Kontiolahti	10 km pursuit
Winter Universiade
Gold medal – first place	1999 Poprad-Tatry	15 km individual
Gold medal – first place	1999 Poprad-Tatry	7.5 km sprint
Gold medal – first place	1999 Poprad-Tatry	3 × 7.5 km relay
Gold medal – first place	2001 Zakopane	15 km individual
Silver medal – second place	1999 Poprad-Tatry	10 km pursuit
Silver medal – second place	2001 Zakopane	10 km pursuit

Martina Halinárová (née Jašicová, also known as Schwarzbacherová from her first marriage; born 22 April 1973) is a Slovak biathlete. She won a silver medal at the 1999 Biathlon World Championships.

Halinárová was born in Dolný Kubín. She competed at five Winter Olympics from 1994 to 2010. Her best Olympic results were fourth place in the relay in 1998 and sixth place in the individual race in 1994.
