= Olena Zubrilova =

Ukrainian born biathlete (born 1973)

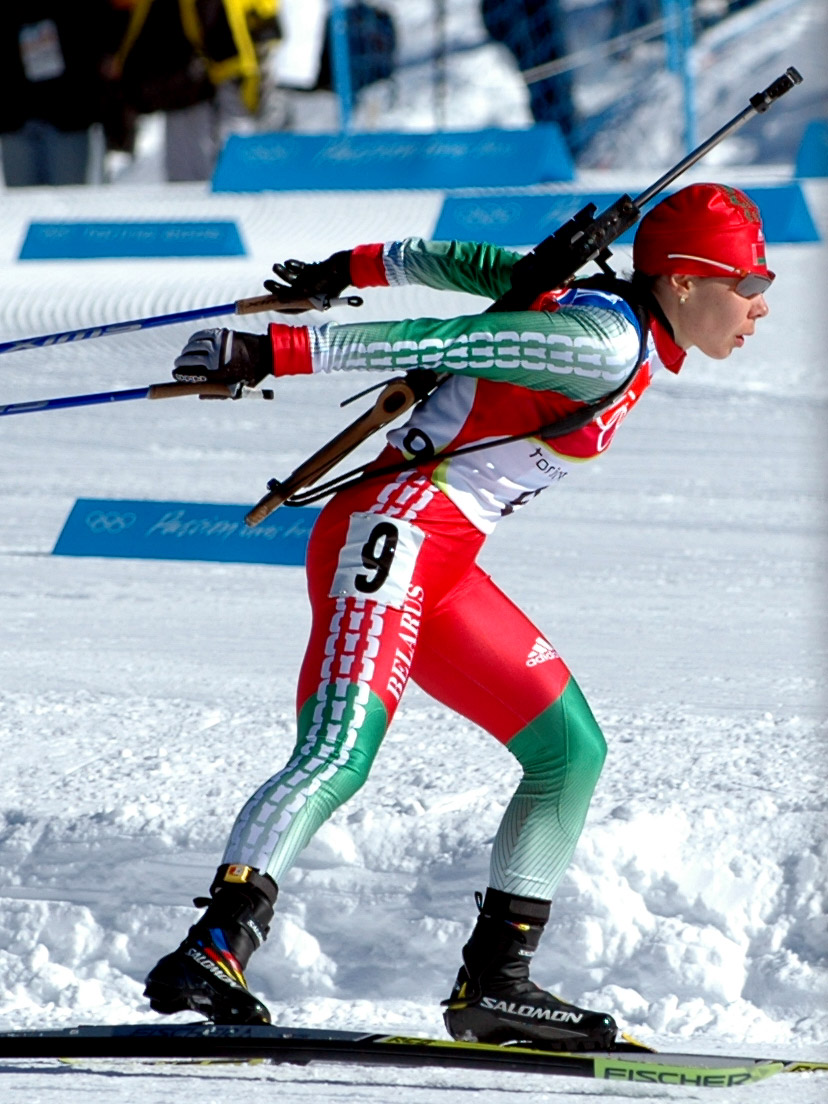

Medal record

Women's biathlon

Representing Belarus

World Championships
Silver medal – second place	2003 Khanty-Mansiysk	15 km individual
Bronze medal – third place	2005 Hochflizen	7.5 km sprint
Bronze medal – third place	2005 Hochflizen	4 × 6 km relay

Representing Ukraine

World Championships
Gold medal – first place	1999 Kontiolahti	15 km individual
Gold medal – first place	1999 Kontiolahti	10 km pursuit
Gold medal – first place	1999 Kontiolahti	12.5 km mass start
Gold medal – first place	2002 Oslo	12.5 km mass start
Silver medal – second place	1996 Ruhpolding	7.5 km team event
Silver medal – second place	1997 Brezno-Osrblie	15 km individual
Silver medal – second place	1997 Brezno-Osrblie	7.5 km sprint
Silver medal – second place	1997 Brezno-Osrblie	10 km pursuit
Bronze medal – third place	1996 Rupholding	4 × 7.5 km relay
Bronze medal – third place	1997 Brezno-Osrblie	Team event
Bronze medal – third place	1999 Kontiolahti	7.5 km sprint
Bronze medal – third place	2000 Oslo	4 × 7.5 km relay
Bronze medal – third place	2001 Pokljuka	15 km individual
Bronze medal – third place	2001 Pokljuka	4 × 7.5 km relay

Olena Zubrilova (Ukrainian: Олена Миколаївна Зубрилова, Belarusian: Алена Зубрылава Alena Zubrylava, Russian: Елена Николаевна Зубрилова; born 25 February 1973 in Shostka, Ukrainian SSR) is a Ukrainian biathlete who has been competing for Belarus since 2002. Prior to that, she had competed for Ukraine from 1991 until she changed her citizenship to Belarus in 2002.

== Career ==
Zubrilova has won a total of seventeen Biathlon World Championships medals in her career, including four gold (pursuit, individual, and mass start: all 1999; and mass start: 2002), five silvers (individual: 1997, 2003; sprint: 1997; pursuit: 1997 and team event: 1996), and eight bronzes (relay: 1996, 2000, 2001, and 2005; sprint: 1999 and 2005; individual: 2001; and team event: 1997). She also competed in three Winter Olympics, her best individual finish was 5th in the 7.5 km at Turin in 2006.

Zubrilova as of 2006 also has the most victories at the Holmenkollen ski festival's biathlon event with five (1999: individual, sprint, pursuit, and mass start; 2002: pursuit). She also has 21 victories in her career.

A divorced mother of one, Zubrilova makes her living as a coach.
