= 2002–03 Biathlon World Cup =

Biathlon competition

2002–03 World Cup
Discipline	Men	Women
Overall	(Norway) Ole Einar Bjørndalen	(Germany) Martina Glagow
Nations Cup	Norway	Russia
Individual	(Norway) Halvard Hanevold	(Norway) Linda Tjørhom
Sprint	(Norway) Ole Einar Bjørndalen	(France) Sylvie Becaert
Pursuit	(Norway) Ole Einar Bjørndalen	(Germany) Martina Glagow
Mass start	(Norway) Ole Einar Bjørndalen	(Russia) Albina Akhatova
Relay	Belarus	Russia

Competition

The 2002–03 Biathlon World Cup was a multi-race tournament over a season of biathlon, organised by the International Biathlon Union.

The men's overall World Cup was won by Norway's Ole Einar Bjørndalen, while Martina Glagow of Germany claimed the women's overall World Cup.

== Calendar ==
Below is the World Cup calendar for the 2004–05 season.

Location	Date	Individual	Sprint	Pursuit	Mass start	Relay	Mixed relay
(Sweden) Östersund	5–8 December		●	●		●	
(Sweden) Östersund	11–15 December		●	●		●	
(Slovakia) Osrblie	19–22 December		●	●		●	
(Germany) Oberhof	8–12 January		●		●	●	
(Germany) Ruhpolding	16–19 January		●	●		●	
(Italy) Antholz	23–26 January	●			●	●	
(Finland) Lahti	8–9 February		●		●		
(Norway) Holmenkollen	13–16 February		●	●		●	
(Sweden) Östersund	20–23 February	●	●	●			
(Russia) Khanty-Mansiysk	15–23 March	●	●	●	●	●	
Total		3	9	7	4	8	0

== World Cup Podium ==
=== Men ===
Stage	Date	Place	Discipline	Winner	Second	Third	Yellow bib (After competition)	Det.
1	5 December 2002	(Sweden) Östersund	10 km Sprint	(Norway) Frode Andresen	(France) Raphaël Poirée	(Belarus) Oleg Ryzhenkov	(Norway) Frode Andresen	Detail
1	8 December 2002	(Sweden) Östersund	12.5 km Pursuit	(Norway) Ole Einar Bjørndalen	(France) Raphaël Poirée	(Norway) Egil Gjelland	(France) Raphaël Poirée	Detail
2	14 December 2002	(Sweden) Östersund	10 km Sprint	(Norway) Ole Einar Bjørndalen	(Norway) Frode Andresen	(Ukraine) Andriy Deryzemlya	(France) Raphaël Poirée	Detail
2	15 December 2002	(Sweden) Östersund	12.5 km Pursuit	(Norway) Ole Einar Bjørndalen	(Germany) Ricco Groß	(Norway) Frode Andresen	(Norway) Ole Einar Bjørndalen	Detail
3	19 December 2002	(Slovakia) Brezno-Osrblie	10 km Sprint	(France) Raphaël Poirée	(Slovenia) Janez Marič	(Norway) Frode Andresen	(France) Raphaël Poirée	Detail
3	22 December 2002	(Slovakia) Brezno-Osrblie	12.5 km Pursuit	(France) Raphaël Poirée	(Germany) Ricco Groß	(Belarus) Vladimir Drachev	(France) Raphaël Poirée	Detail
4	9 January 2003	(Germany) Oberhof	10 km Sprint	(Norway) Ole Einar Bjørndalen	(Russia) Sergei Tchepikov	(Austria) Wolfgang Rottmann	(France) Raphaël Poirée	Detail
4	12 January 2003	(Germany) Oberhof	15 km Mass Start	(Norway) Ole Einar Bjørndalen	(Belarus) Vladimir Drachev	(France) Raphaël Poirée	(France) Raphaël Poirée	Detail
5	18 January 2003	(Germany) Ruhpolding	10 km Sprint	(Norway) Ole Einar Bjørndalen	(Norway) Frode Andresen	(France) Raphaël Poirée	(France) Raphaël Poirée	Detail
5	19 January 2003	(Germany) Ruhpolding	12.5 km Pursuit	(Norway) Ole Einar Bjørndalen	(France) Raphaël Poirée	(Germany) Frank Luck	(France) Raphaël Poirée	Detail
6	23 January 2003	(Italy) Antholz-Anterselva	20 km Individual	(Belarus) Vladimir Drachev	(Norway) Halvard Hanevold	(Norway) Stian Eckhoff	(France) Raphaël Poirée	Detail
6	26 January 2003	(Italy) Antholz-Anterselva	15 km Mass Start	(Ukraine) Andriy Deryzemlya	(Russia) Pavel Rostovtsev	(Germany) Ricco Groß	(France) Raphaël Poirée	Detail
7	8 February 2003	(Finland) Lahti	10 km Sprint	(Germany) Alexander Wolf	(Russia) Sergei Tchepikov	(Belarus) Alexei Aidarov	(Norway) Ole Einar Bjørndalen	Detail
7	9 February 2003	(Finland) Lahti	15 km Mass Start	(Norway) Ole Einar Bjørndalen	(Belarus) Oleg Ryzhenkov	(Norway) Halvard Hanevold	(Norway) Ole Einar Bjørndalen	Detail
8	15 February 2003	(Norway) Oslo Holmenkollen	10 km Sprint	(Belarus) Vladimir Drachev	(Russia) Pavel Rostovtsev	(Germany) Sven Fischer	(Norway) Ole Einar Bjørndalen	Detail
8	16 February 2003	(Norway) Oslo Holmenkollen	12.5 km Pursuit	(Norway) Ole Einar Bjørndalen	(Germany) Sven Fischer	(Norway) Stian Eckhoff	(Norway) Ole Einar Bjørndalen	Detail
9	20 February 2003	(Sweden) Östersund	10 km Sprint	(Germany) Sven Fischer	(Belarus) Vladimir Drachev	(Norway) Lars Berger	(Norway) Ole Einar Bjørndalen	Detail
9	21 February 2003	(Sweden) Östersund	20 km Individual	(Slovenia) Janez Marič	(Czech Republic) Zdeněk Vítek	(Slovenia) Marko Dolenc	(Norway) Ole Einar Bjørndalen	Detail
9	23 February 2003	(Sweden) Östersund	12.5 km Pursuit	(Belarus) Vladimir Drachev	(Czech Republic) Zdeněk Vítek	(Norway) Halvard Hanevold	(Norway) Ole Einar Bjørndalen	Detail
WC	15 March 2003	(Russia) Khanty-Mansiysk	10 km Sprint	(Norway) Ole Einar Bjørndalen	(Germany) Ricco Groß	(Czech Republic) Zdeněk Vítek	(Norway) Ole Einar Bjørndalen	Detail
WC	16 March 2003	(Russia) Khanty-Mansiysk	12.5 km Pursuit	(Germany) Ricco Groß	(Norway) Halvard Hanevold	(Finland) Paavo Puurunen	(Norway) Ole Einar Bjørndalen	Detail
WC	19 March 2003	(Russia) Khanty-Mansiysk	20 km Individual	(Norway) Halvard Hanevold	(Finland) Vesa Hietalahti	(Germany) Ricco Groß	(Norway) Ole Einar Bjørndalen	Detail
WC	23 March 2003	(Russia) Khanty-Mansiysk	15 km Mass Start	(Norway) Ole Einar Bjørndalen	(Germany) Sven Fischer	(France) Raphaël Poirée	(Norway) Ole Einar Bjørndalen	Detail

=== Women ===
Stage	Date	Place	Discipline	Winner	Second	Third	Yellow bib (After competition)	Det.
1	5 December 2002	(Sweden) Östersund	7.5 km Sprint	(Russia) Olga Zaitseva	(France) Sylvie Becaert	(Russia) Olga Pyleva	(Russia) Olga Zaitseva	Detail
1	8 December 2002	(Sweden) Östersund	10 km Pursuit	(Germany) Kati Wilhelm	(Russia) Olga Zaitseva	(Germany) Katja Beer	(Russia) Olga Zaitseva	Detail
2	13 December 2002	(Sweden) Östersund	7.5 km Sprint	(Norway) Linda Tjørhom	(Russia) Svetlana Ishmouratova	(Bulgaria) Ekaterina Dafovska	(Russia) Olga Zaitseva	Detail
2	15 December 2002	(Sweden) Östersund	10 km Pursuit	(Germany) Katja Beer	(Norway) Linda Tjørhom	(Finland) Sanna-Leena Perunka	(Norway) Linda Tjørhom	Detail
3	19 December 2002	(Slovakia) Brezno-Osrblie	7.5 km Sprint	(Russia) Galina Koukleva	(Russia) Albina Akhatova	(Germany) Uschi Disl	(Norway) Linda Tjørhom	Detail
3	22 December 2002	(Slovakia) Brezno-Osrblie	10 km Pursuit	(Bulgaria) Ekaterina Dafovska	(Russia) Galina Koukleva	(Germany) Martina Glagow	(Russia) Galina Koukleva	Detail
4	8 January 2003	(Germany) Oberhof	7.5 km Sprint	(Bulgaria) Ekaterina Dafovska	(France) Sylvie Becaert	(Czech Republic) Kateřina Holubcová	(Bulgaria) Ekaterina Dafovska	Detail
4	12 January 2003	(Germany) Oberhof	12.5 km Mass Start	(Germany) Uschi Disl	(Bulgaria) Ekaterina Dafovska	(France) Sylvie Becaert	(Bulgaria) Ekaterina Dafovska	Detail
5	17 January 2003	(Germany) Ruhpolding	7.5 km Sprint	(Russia) Galina Koukleva	(Germany) Martina Glagow	(Russia) Olga Pyleva	(Bulgaria) Ekaterina Dafovska	Detail
5	19 January 2003	(Germany) Ruhpolding	10 km Pursuit	(Bulgaria) Ekaterina Dafovska	(Germany) Martina Glagow	(Russia) Svetlana Ishmouratova	(Bulgaria) Ekaterina Dafovska	Detail
6	23 January 2003	(Italy) Antholz-Anterselva	15 km Individual	(Bulgaria) Ekaterina Dafovska	(France) Sandrine Bailly	(Norway) Linda Tjørhom	(Bulgaria) Ekaterina Dafovska	Detail
6	26 January 2003	(Italy) Antholz-Anterselva	12.5 km Mass Start	(Russia) Albina Akhatova	(France) Sylvie Becaert	(France) Corinne Niogret	(Bulgaria) Ekaterina Dafovska	Detail
7	8 February 2003	(Finland) Lahti	7.5 km Sprint	(Russia) Olga Pyleva	(Russia) Albina Akhatova	(Germany) Kati Wilhelm	(Bulgaria) Ekaterina Dafovska	Detail
7	9 February 2003	(Finland) Lahti	12.5 km Mass Start	(Germany) Kati Wilhelm	(Germany) Martina Glagow	(Bulgaria) Ekaterina Dafovska	(Bulgaria) Ekaterina Dafovska	Detail
8	15 February 2003	(Norway) Oslo Holmenkollen	7.5 km Sprint	(France) Sandrine Bailly	(Russia) Albina Akhatova	(Germany) Martina Glagow	(Bulgaria) Ekaterina Dafovska	Detail
8	16 February 2003	(Norway) Oslo Holmenkollen	10 km Pursuit	(Germany) Martina Glagow	(Belarus) Olena Zubrilova	(Italy) Michela Ponza	(Bulgaria) Ekaterina Dafovska	Detail
9	20 February 2003	(Sweden) Östersund	7.5 km Sprint	(Germany) Kati Wilhelm	(Belarus) Olena Zubrilova	(Germany) Uschi Disl	(Bulgaria) Ekaterina Dafovska	Detail
9	22 February 2003	(Sweden) Östersund	15 km Individual	(Russia) Olga Zaitseva	(Norway) Linda Tjørhom	(Russia) Olga Pyleva	(Bulgaria) Ekaterina Dafovska	Detail
9	23 February 2003	(Sweden) Östersund	10 km Pursuit	(Belarus) Olena Zubrilova	(Norway) Linda Tjørhom	(Czech Republic) Kateřina Holubcová	(Germany) Martina Glagow	Detail
WC	15 March 2003	(Russia) Khanty-Mansiysk	7.5 km Sprint	(France) Sylvie Becaert	(Ukraine) Olena Petrova	(Czech Republic) Kateřina Holubcová	(Germany) Martina Glagow	Detail
WC	16 March 2003	(Russia) Khanty-Mansiysk	10 km Pursuit	(Germany) Martina Glagow (France) Sandrine Bailly		(Russia) Svetlana Ishmouratova	(Germany) Martina Glagow	Detail
WC	18 March 2003	(Russia) Khanty-Mansiysk	15 km Individual	(Czech Republic) Kateřina Holubcová	(Belarus) Olena Zubrilova	(Norway) Gunn Margit Andreassen	(Germany) Martina Glagow	Detail
WC	22 March 2003	(Russia) Khanty-Mansiysk	12.5 km Mass Start	(Russia) Albina Akhatova	(Russia) Svetlana Ishmouratova	(France) Sandrine Bailly	(Germany) Martina Glagow	Detail

=== Men's team ===
Event	Date	Place	Discipline	Winner	Second	Third
1	7 December 2002	(Sweden) Östersund	4x7.5 km Relay	Norway Egil Gjelland; Frode Andresen; Ole Einar Bjørndalen; Halvard Hanevold	Russia Viktor Maigourov; Sergei Rozhkov; Sergei Tchepikov; Pavel Rostovtsev	Germany Ricco Gross; Peter Sendel; Sven Fischer; Frank Luck
2	12 December 2002	(Sweden) Östersund	4x7.5 km Relay	Belarus Alexei Aidarov; Vladimir Drachev; Rustam Valiullin; Oleg Ryzhenkov	Norway Egil Gjelland; Ole Einar Bjørndalen; Frode Andresen; Halvard Hanevold	Russia Viktor Maigourov; Sergei Rozhkov; Sergei Tchepikov; Pavel Rostovtsev
3	20 December 2002	(Slovakia) Osrblie	4x7.5 km Relay	Russia Viktor Maigourov; Pavel Rostovtsev; Sergei Rozhkov; Sergei Tchepikov	Germany Peter Sendel; Sven Fischer; Michael Greis; Frank Luck	France Ferréol Cannard; Vincent Defrasne; Julien Robert; Raphael Poiree
4	11 January 2003	(Germany) Oberhof	4x7.5 km Relay	Russia Viktor Maigourov; Pavel Rostovtsev; Sergei Rozhkov; Sergei Tchepikov	Belarus Alexei Aidarov; Vladimir Drachev; Rustam Valiullin; Oleg Ryzhenkov	France Ferréol Cannard; Vincent Defrasne; Julien Robert; Raphael Poiree
5	16 January 2003	(Germany) Ruhpolding	4x7.5 km Relay	France Ferréol Cannard; Vincent Defrasne; Julien Robert; Raphael Poiree	Germany Michael Greis; Sven Fischer; Peter Sendel; Ricco Gross	Norway Halvard Hanevold; Frode Andresen; Egil Gjelland; Ole Einar Bjørndalen
6	25 January 2003	(Italy) Antholz-Anterselva	4x7.5 km Relay	Belarus Alexei Aidarov; Vladimir Drachev; Rustam Valiullin; Oleg Ryzhenkov	Norway Egil Gjelland; Lars Berger; Stian Eckhoff; Halvard Hanevold	Italy Rene Cattarinussi; Rene-Laurent Vuillermoz; Devis Da Canal; Wilfried Pallhuber
8	13 February 2003	(Norway) Holmenkollen	4x7.5 km Relay	Belarus Alexei Aidarov; Vladimir Drachev; Rustam Valiullin; Oleg Ryzhenkov	Russia Sergei Rozhkov; Pavel Rostovtsev; Nikolay Kruglov; Sergei Tchepikov	Norway Halvard Hanevold; Stian Eckhoff; Egil Gjelland; Ole Einar Bjørndalen
WC	21 March 2003	(Russia) Khanty-Mansiysk	4x7.5 km Relay	Germany Peter Sendel; Sven Fischer; Ricco Gross; Frank Luck	Russia Viktor Maigourov; Pavel Rostovtsev; Sergei Rozhkov; Sergei Tchepikov	Belarus Alexei Aidarov; Vladimir Drachev; Rustam Valiullin; Oleg Ryzhenkov

=== Women's team ===
Event	Date	Place	Discipline	Winner	Second	Third
1	6 December 2002	(Sweden) Östersund	4x6 km Relay	Germany Katrin Apel; Uschi Disl; Simone Denkinger; Kati Wilhelm	Norway Linda Tjorhom; Gro Marit Istad-Kristiansen; Tora Berger; Gunn Margit Andreassen	Russia Olga Pyleva; Olga Zaitseva; Anna Bogaliy; Albina Akhatova
2	11 December 2002	(Sweden) Östersund	4x6 km Relay	Russia Svetlana Tchernousova; Galina Kukleva; Irina Malgina; Svetlana Ishmouratova	Germany Martina Glagow; Simone Denkinger; Andrea Henkel; Katja Beer	Bulgaria Nina Klenovska; Pavlina Filipova; Ekaterina Dafovska; Iva Karagiozova
3	21 December 2002	(Slovakia) Osrblie	4x6 km Relay	Belarus Lilia Efremova; Olga Nazarova; Lyudmila Lysenko; Olena Zubrilova	Germany Martina Glagow; Simone Denkinger; Katja Beer; Kati Wilhelm	Norway Liv-Kjersti Eikeland; Borghild Ouren; Gunn Margit Andreassen; Linda Tjorhom
4	10 January 2003	(Germany) Oberhof	4x6 km Relay	Germany Katrin Apel; Uschi Disl; Andrea Henkel; Kati Wilhelm	Russia Albina Akhatova; Svetlana Tchernousova; Galina Kukleva; Olga Pyleva	France Sylvie Becaert; Sandrine Bailly; Julie Carraz; Corinne Niogret
5	15 January 2003	(Germany) Ruhpolding	4x6 km Relay	Russia Albina Akhatova; Svetlana Ishmouratova; Galina Kukleva; Olga Pyleva	Germany Martina Glagow; Uschi Disl; Andrea Henkel; Kati Wilhelm	Norway Linda Tjorhom; Ann-Elen Skjelbreid; Gro Marit Istad-Kristiansen; Gunn Margit Andreassen
6	24 January 2003	(Italy) Antholz-Anterselva	4x6 km Relay	Russia Albina Akhatova; Anna Bogaliy; Svetlana Tchernousova; Olga Pyleva	Germany Simone Denkinger; Uschi Disl; Romy Beer; Kati Wilhelm	Belarus Lilia Efremova; Olga Nazarova; Lyudmila Lysenko; Olena Zubrilova
8	13 February 2003	(Norway) Holmenkollen	4x6 km Relay	Russia Albina Akhatova; Svetlana Tchernousova; Olga Zaitseva; Olga Pyleva	Belarus Lilia Efremova; Olga Nazarova; Lyudmila Ananko; Olena Zubrilova	France Florence Baverel-Robert; Sandrine Bailly; Corinne Niogret; Sylvie Becaert
WC	20 March 2003	(Russia) Khanty-Mansiysk	4x6 km Relay	Russia Albina Akhatova; Svetlana Ishmouratova; Galina Kukleva; Svetlana Tchernousova	Ukraine Oksana Khvostenko; Iryna Merkushina; Oksana Yakovlieva; Olena Petrova	Germany Simone Denkinger; Uschi Disl; Kati Wilhelm; Martina Glagow

== Standings: Men ==
=== Overall ===
Pos.		Points
1.	(Norway) Ole Einar Bjørndalen	737
2.	(Belarus) Vladimir Drachev	630
3.	(Germany) Ricco Groß	613
4.	(France) Raphaël Poirée	591
5.	(Norway) Halvard Hanevold	553

- Final standings after 23 races.

=== Individual ===
Pos.		Points
1.	(Norway) Halvard Hanevold	96
2.	(Finland) Vesa Hietalahti	83
3.	(Germany) Ricco Groß	80
4.	(Norway) Egil Gjelland	64
5.	(Slovenia) Janez Marič	61

- Final standings after 3 races.

=== Sprint ===
Pos.		Points
1.	(Norway) Ole Einar Bjørndalen	328
2.	(Norway) Frode Andresen	252
3.	(Belarus) Vladimir Drachev	247
4.	(France) Raphaël Poirée	226
5.	(Germany) Sven Fischer	213

- Final standings after 9 races.

=== Pursuit ===
Pos.		Points
1.	(Norway) Ole Einar Bjørndalen	230
2.	(Germany) Ricco Groß	205
3.	(France) Raphaël Poirée	199
4.	(Belarus) Vladimir Drachev	197
5.	(Norway) Halvard Hanevold	154

- Final standings after 7 races.

=== Mass Start ===
Pos.		Points
1.	(Norway) Ole Einar Bjørndalen	150
2.	(Belarus) Vladimir Drachev	114
3.	(France) Raphaël Poirée	114
4.	(Germany) Ricco Groß	109
5.	(Belarus) Oleg Ryzhenkov	100

- Final standings after 4 races.

=== Relay ===
Pos.		Points
1.	Belarus	319
2.	Russia	318
3.	Norway	298
4.	Germany	288
5.	France	279

- Final standings after 8 races.

=== Nation ===
Pos.		Points
1.	Norway	4029
2.	Germany	3778
3.	Russia	3704
4.	Belarus	3599
5.	France	3547

- Final standings after 20 races.

== Standings: Women ==
=== Overall ===
Pos.		Points
1.	(Germany) Martina Glagow	729
2.	(Russia) Albina Akhatova	699
3.	(France) Sylvie Becaert	680
4.	(Bulgaria) Ekaterina Dafovska	644
5.	(Belarus) Olena Zubrilova	634

- Final standings after 23 races.

=== Individual ===
Pos.		Points
1.	(Norway) Linda Tjørhom	89
2.	(Bulgaria) Ekaterina Dafovska	80
3.	(Belarus) Olena Zubrilova	80
4.	(Norway) Gunn Margit Andreassen	77
5.	(Czech Republic) Kateřina Holubcová	76

- Final standings after 3 races.

=== Sprint ===
Pos.		Points
1.	(France) Sylvie Becaert	280
2.	(Germany) Martina Glagow	270
3.	(Bulgaria) Ekaterina Dafovska	253
4.	(Russia) Albina Akhatova	238
5.	(Russia) Olga Pyleva	234

- Final standings after 9 races.

=== Pursuit ===
Pos.		Points
1.	(Germany) Martina Glagow	257
2.	(Belarus) Olena Zubrilova	244
3.	(France) Sylvie Becaert	197
4.	(Russia) Albina Akhatova	194
5.	(France) Sandrine Bailly	180

- Final standings after 7 races.

=== Mass Start ===
Pos.		Points
1.	(Russia) Albina Akhatova	126
2.	(Russia) Svetlana Ishmouratova	120
3.	(France) Sylvie Becaert	119
4.	(Germany) Uschi Disl	118
5.	(France) Corinne Niogret	115

- Final standings after 8 races.

=== Relay ===
Pos.		Points
1.	Russia	339
2.	Germany	327
3.	Belarus	293
4.	Norway	278
5.	France	249

- Final standings after 8 races.

=== Nation ===
Pos.		Points
1.	Russia	4086
2.	Germany	4034
3.	France	3760
4.	Bulgaria	3532
5.	Belarus	3393

- Final standings after 20 races.

== Medal table ==
Rank	Nation	Gold	Silver	Bronze	Total
1	Norway	15	10	14	39
2	Russia	14	15	7	36
3	Germany	13	14	12	39
4	Belarus	8	8	5	21
5	France	6	7	10	23
6	Bulgaria	4	1	3	8
7	Czech Republic	1	2	4	7
8	Ukraine	1	2	1	4
9	Slovenia	1	1	1	3
10	Finland	0	1	2	3
11	Italy	0	0	2	2
12	Austria	0	0	1	1
Totals (12 entries)		63	61	62	186

== Achievements ==
Victory in this World Cup (all-time number of victories in parentheses)

Men

- Ole Einar Bjørndalen (NOR), 11 (38) first places
- Vladimir Drachev (BLR), 3 (15) first places
- Raphaël Poirée (FRA), 2 (23) first places
- Sven Fischer (GER), 1 (23) first place
- Frode Andresen (NOR), 1 (12) first place
- Ricco Groß (GER), 1 (7) first place
- Halvard Hanevold (NOR), 1 (6) first place
- Andriy Deryzemlya (UKR), 1 (1) first place
- Alexander Wolf (GER), 1 (1) first place
- Janez Marič (SVN), 1 (1) first place

Women

- Ekaterina Dafovska (BUL), 4 (5) first places
- Kati Wilhelm (GER), 3 (6) first places
- Galina Kukleva (RUS), 2 (9) first places
- Martina Glagow (GER), 2 (4) first places
- Sandrine Bailly (FRA), 2 (3) first places
- Olga Zaitseva (RUS), 2 (2) first places
- Albina Akhatova (RUS), 2 (2) first places
- Uschi Disl (GER), 1 (21) first place
- Olena Zubrilova (BLR), 1 (18) first place
- Olga Pyleva (RUS), 1 (2) first place
- Linda Tjørhom (NOR), 1 (1) first place
- Katja Beer (GER), 1 (1) first place
- Sylvie Becaert (FRA), 1 (1) first place
- Kateřina Holubcová (CZE), 1 (1) first place

== Retirements ==
The following notable biathletes retired after the 2002–03 season:

- Gilles Marguet (FRA)
- René Cattarinussi (ITA)
- Viktor Maigourov (RUS)
- Tomaž Globočník (SLO)
- Tord Wiksten (SWE)
- Iva Karagiozova (BUL)
- Galina Kukleva (RUS)
