= 2005–06 Biathlon World Cup =

Biathlon competition

2005–06 World Cup
Discipline	Men	Women
Overall	(Norway) Ole Einar Bjørndalen	(Germany) Kati Wilhelm
Nations Cup	Germany	Germany
Individual	(Germany) Michael Greis	(Russia) Svetlana Ishmouratova
Sprint	(Poland) Tomasz Sikora	(Germany) Kati Wilhelm
Pursuit	(Norway) Ole Einar Bjørndalen	(Germany) Kati Wilhelm
Mass start	(Norway) Ole Einar Bjørndalen	(Germany) Martina Glagow
Relay	Germany	Russia

Competition

The 2005–06 Biathlon World Cup was a multi-race tournament over a season of biathlon, organised by the International Biathlon Union. The 2006 Winter Olympics were part of the Biathlon World Cup. The season lasted from 26 November 2005 to 26 March 2006.

The men's overall World Cup was won by Norway's Ole Einar Bjørndalen, while Kati Wilhelm of Germany claimed the women's overall World Cup.

== Calendar ==
Below is the World Cup calendar for the 2005–06 season.

Location	Date	Individual	Sprint	Pursuit	Mass start	Relay	Details
(Sweden) Östersund	25–29 November		●	●		●	
(Austria) Hochfilzen	7–11 December	●	●			●	
(Slovakia) Brezno-Osrblie	14–18 December	●	●	●			
(Germany) Oberhof	3–8 January		●		●	●	
(Germany) Ruhpolding	10–15 January		●	●		●	
(Italy) Antholz	18–22 January		●	●	●		
(Italy) Cesana San Sicario	10–26 February	●	●	●	●	●	Winter Olympics
(Slovenia) Pokljuka	7–11 March		●	●			
(Finland) Kontiolahti	15–19 March		●	●	●		
(Norway) Oslo	22–26 March		●	●	●		
Total		3	10	8	5	5	

== World Cup Podium ==
=== Men ===
Stage	Date	Place	Discipline	Winner	Second	Third	Yellow bib (After competition)	Det.
1	26 November 2005	(Sweden) Östersund	10 km Sprint	(Norway) Stian Eckhoff	(France) Raphaël Poirée	(Latvia) Ilmārs Bricis	(Norway) Stian Eckhoff	Detail
1	27 November 2005	(Sweden) Östersund	12.5 km Pursuit	(Norway) Ole Einar Bjørndalen	(France) Vincent Defrasne	(Russia) Ivan Tcherezov	(Norway) Ole Einar Bjørndalen	Detail
2	8 December 2005	(Austria) Hochfilzen	20 km Individual	(France) Raphaël Poirée	(Norway) Ole Einar Bjørndalen	(Germany) Michael Greis	(Norway) Ole Einar Bjørndalen	Detail
2	10 December 2005	(Austria) Hochfilzen	10 km Sprint	(Norway) Frode Andresen	(Norway) Lars Berger	(Germany) Sven Fischer	(Norway) Ole Einar Bjørndalen	Detail
3	15 December 2005	(Slovakia) Brezno-Osrblie	20 km Individual	(Germany) Sven Fischer	(Russia) Maxim Tchoudov	(Germany) Michael Rösch	(Norway) Ole Einar Bjørndalen	Detail
3	16 December 2005	(Slovakia) Brezno-Osrblie	10 km Sprint	(Germany) Alexander Wolf	(Germany) Michael Rösch	(Germany) Sven Fischer	(France) Raphaël Poirée	Detail
3	18 December 2005	(Slovakia) Brezno-Osrblie	12.5 km Pursuit	(Germany) Sven Fischer	(Germany) Alexander Wolf	(Germany) Michael Rösch	(Germany) Alexander Wolf	Detail
4	7 January 2006	(Germany) Oberhof	10 km Sprint	(France) Vincent Defrasne	(Germany) Alexander Wolf	(Russia) Maxim Tchoudov	(Germany) Alexander Wolf	Detail
4	8 January 2006	(Germany) Oberhof	15 km Mass Start	(Norway) Halvard Hanevold	(Germany) Sven Fischer	(France) Raphaël Poirée	(Germany) Alexander Wolf	Detail
5	14 January 2006	(Germany) Ruhpolding	10 km Sprint	(Norway) Frode Andresen	(Germany) Michael Rösch	(Germany) Michael Greis	(France) Raphaël Poirée	Detail
5	15 January 2006	(Germany) Ruhpolding	12.5 km Pursuit	(Germany) Michael Rösch	(France) Raphaël Poirée	(Russia) Sergei Tchepikov	(France) Raphaël Poirée	Detail
6	19 January 2006	(Italy) Antholz-Anterselva	10 km Sprint	(Norway) Frode Andresen	(Germany) Ricco Groß	(Russia) Maxim Tchoudov	(France) Raphaël Poirée	Detail
6	20 January 2006	(Italy) Antholz-Anterselva	12.5 km Pursuit	(Germany) Ricco Groß	(Norway) Halvard Hanevold	(Norway) Frode Andresen	(France) Raphaël Poirée	Detail
6	22 January 2006	(Italy) Antholz-Anterselva	15 km Mass Start	(Norway) Ole Einar Bjørndalen	(France) Raphaël Poirée	(Norway) Frode Andresen	(France) Raphaël Poirée	Detail
OG	11 February 2006	(Italy) Turin	20 km Individual	(Germany) Michael Greis	(Norway) Ole Einar Bjørndalen	(Norway) Halvard Hanevold	(France) Raphaël Poirée	Detail
OG	14 February 2006	(Italy) Turin	10 km Sprint	(Germany) Sven Fischer	(Norway) Halvard Hanevold	(Norway) Frode Andresen	(France) Raphaël Poirée	Detail
OG	18 February 2006	(Italy) Turin	12.5 km Pursuit	(France) Vincent Defrasne	(Norway) Ole Einar Bjørndalen	(Germany) Sven Fischer	(Germany) Sven Fischer	Detail
OG	25 February 2006	(Italy) Turin	15 km Mass Start	(Germany) Michael Greis	(Poland) Tomasz Sikora	(Norway) Ole Einar Bjørndalen	(Germany) Sven Fischer	Detail
7	8 March 2006	(Slovenia) Pokljuka	10 km Sprint	(Norway) Ole Einar Bjørndalen	(France) Raphaël Poirée	(Sweden) Carl Johan Bergman	(France) Raphaël Poirée	Detail
7	11 March 2006	(Slovenia) Pokljuka	12.5 km Pursuit	(Norway) Ole Einar Bjørndalen	(France) Raphaël Poirée	(Sweden) Carl Johan Bergman	(France) Raphaël Poirée	Detail
8	16 March 2006	(Finland) Kontiolahti	10 km Sprint	(Sweden) Carl Johan Bergman	(Poland) Tomasz Sikora	(Germany) Sven Fischer	(France) Raphaël Poirée	Detail
8	18 March 2006	(Finland) Kontiolahti	12.5 km Pursuit	(Norway) Ole Einar Bjørndalen	(France) Raphaël Poirée	(Norway) Lars Berger	(France) Raphaël Poirée	Detail
8	19 March 2006	(Finland) Kontiolahti	15 km Mass Start	(Poland) Tomasz Sikora	(France) Raphaël Poirée	(Norway) Ole Einar Bjørndalen	(France) Raphaël Poirée	Detail
9	23 March 2006	(Norway) Oslo Holmenkollen	10 km Sprint	(Norway) Ole Einar Bjørndalen	(Latvia) Ilmārs Bricis	(Sweden) Mattias Nilsson	(Norway) Ole Einar Bjørndalen	Detail
9	25 March 2006	(Norway) Oslo Holmenkollen	12.5 km Pursuit	(Norway) Ole Einar Bjørndalen	(Poland) Tomasz Sikora	(Germany) Ricco Groß	(Norway) Ole Einar Bjørndalen	Detail
9	26 March 2006	(Norway) Oslo Holmenkollen	15 km Mass Start	(Norway) Ole Einar Bjørndalen	(Czech Republic) Roman Dostál	(Russia) Sergei Rozhkov	(Norway) Ole Einar Bjørndalen	Detail

=== Women ===
Stage	Date	Place	Discipline	Winner	Second	Third	Yellow bib (After competition)	Det.
1	26 November 2005	(Sweden) Östersund	7.5 km Sprint	(Germany) Uschi Disl	(Slovenia) Tadeja Brankovič	(Germany) Katrin Apel	(Germany) Uschi Disl	Detail
1	27 November 2005	(Sweden) Östersund	10 km Pursuit	(Russia) Olga Zaitseva	(Germany) Kati Wilhelm	(Germany) Andrea Henkel	(Germany) Uschi Disl	Detail
2	7 December 2005	(Austria) Hochfilzen	15 km Individual	(Sweden) Anna Carin Olofsson	(Russia) Olga Zaitseva	(Russia) Natalia Guseva	(Russia) Olga Zaitseva	Detail
2	9 December 2005	(Austria) Hochfilzen	7.5 km Sprint	(Germany) Kati Wilhelm	(Russia) Svetlana Ishmouratova	(Germany) Uschi Disl	(Russia) Olga Zaitseva	Detail
3	15 December 2005	(Slovakia) Brezno-Osrblie	15 km Individual	(Russia) Svetlana Ishmouratova	(Russia) Albina Akhatova	(France) Florence Baverel-Robert	(Russia) Olga Zaitseva	Detail
3	17 December 2005	(Slovakia) Brezno-Osrblie	7.5 km Sprint	(Sweden) Anna Carin Olofsson	(Germany) Kati Wilhelm	(Ukraine) Lilia Efremova	(Germany) Kati Wilhelm	Detail
3	18 December 2005	(Slovakia) Brezno-Osrblie	10 km Pursuit	(Sweden) Anna Carin Olofsson	(Germany) Kati Wilhelm	(Germany) Uschi Disl	(Germany) Kati Wilhelm	Detail
4	7 January 2006	(Germany) Oberhof	7.5 km Sprint	(Germany) Kati Wilhelm	(Sweden) Anna Carin Olofsson	(Norway) Linda Tjørhom	(Germany) Kati Wilhelm	Detail
4	8 January 2006	(Germany) Oberhof	12.5 km Mass Start	(Germany) Martina Glagow	(Russia) Olga Pyleva	(Germany) Katrin Apel	(Germany) Kati Wilhelm	Detail
5	13 January 2006	(Germany) Ruhpolding	7.5 km Sprint	(France) Sandrine Bailly	(Germany) Kati Wilhelm	(Russia) Svetlana Ishmouratova	(Germany) Kati Wilhelm	Detail
5	15 January 2006	(Germany) Ruhpolding	10 km Pursuit	(Norway) Liv Grete Poirée	(Germany) Kati Wilhelm	(Russia) Albina Akhatova	(Germany) Kati Wilhelm	Detail
6	19 January 2006	(Italy) Antholz-Anterselva	7.5 km Sprint	(Germany) Kati Wilhelm	(France) Sandrine Bailly	(Russia) Albina Akhatova	(Germany) Kati Wilhelm	Detail
6	21 January 2006	(Italy) Antholz-Anterselva	10 km Pursuit	(Germany) Kati Wilhelm	(France) Sandrine Bailly	(Russia) Albina Akhatova	(Germany) Kati Wilhelm	Detail
6	22 January 2006	(Italy) Antholz-Anterselva	12.5 km Mass Start	(Germany) Martina Glagow	(Germany) Andrea Henkel	(Germany) Uschi Disl	(Germany) Kati Wilhelm	Detail
OG	13 February 2006	(Italy) Turin	15 km Individual	(Russia) Svetlana Ishmouratova	(Russia) Olga Pyleva	(Germany) Martina Glagow	(Germany) Kati Wilhelm	Detail
OG	16 February 2006	(Italy) Turin	7.5 km Sprint	(France) Florence Baverel-Robert	(Sweden) Anna Carin Olofsson	(Ukraine) Lilia Efremova	(Germany) Kati Wilhelm	Detail
OG	18 February 2006	(Italy) Turin	10 km Pursuit	(Germany) Kati Wilhelm	(Germany) Martina Glagow	(Russia) Albina Akhatova	(Germany) Kati Wilhelm	Detail
OG	25 February 2006	(Italy) Turin	12.5 km Mass Start	(Sweden) Anna Carin Olofsson	(Germany) Kati Wilhelm	(Germany) Uschi Disl	(Germany) Kati Wilhelm	Detail
7	9 March 2006	(Slovenia) Pokljuka	7.5 km Sprint	(Norway) Linda Tjørhom	(France) Sandrine Bailly	(France) Florence Baverel-Robert	(Germany) Kati Wilhelm	Detail
7	11 March 2006	(Slovenia) Pokljuka	10 km Pursuit	(France) Sandrine Bailly	(Germany) Kati Wilhelm	(Germany) Katrin Apel	(Germany) Kati Wilhelm	Detail
8	16 March 2005	(Finland) Kontiolahti	7.5 km Sprint	(Sweden) Anna Carin Olofsson	(Belarus) Olena Zubrilova	(Slovenia) Tadeja Brankovič	(Germany) Kati Wilhelm	Detail
8	18 March 2006	(Finland) Kontiolahti	10 km Pursuit	(Sweden) Anna Carin Olofsson	(Germany) Kati Wilhelm	(Belarus) Olena Zubrilova	(Germany) Kati Wilhelm	Detail
8	19 March 2006	(Finland) Kontiolahti	12.5 km Mass Start	(Belarus) Olena Zubrilova	(Germany) Kati Wilhelm	(Slovenia) Tadeja Brankovič	(Germany) Kati Wilhelm	Detail
9	23 March 2006	(Norway) Oslo Holmenkollen	7.5 km Sprint	(Germany) Martina Glagow	(Italy) Michela Ponza	(Belarus) Ekaterina Ivanova	(Germany) Kati Wilhelm	Detail
9	25 March 2006	(Norway) Oslo Holmenkollen	10 km Pursuit	(Germany) Kati Wilhelm	(Russia) Anna Bogaliy-Titovets	(Sweden) Anna Carin Olofsson	(Germany) Kati Wilhelm	Detail
9	26 March 2006	(Norway) Oslo Holmenkollen	12.5 km Mass Start	(Norway) Linda Tjørhom	(France) Sandrine Bailly	(Belarus) Olga Nazarova	(Germany) Kati Wilhelm	Detail

=== Men's team ===
Event	Date	Place	Discipline	Winner	Second	Third
1	29 November 2005	(Sweden) Östersund	4x7.5 km Relay	Norway Stian Eckhoff; Egil Gjelland; Halvard Hanevold; Ole Einar Bjørndalen	Russia Filipp Shulman; Ivan Tcherezov; Pavel Rostovtsev; Nikolay Kruglov	France Julien Robert; Raphael Poiree; Alexandre Aubert; Vincent Defrasne
2	11 December 2005	(Austria) Hochfilzen	4x7.5 km Relay	Germany Ricco Gross; Alexander Wolf; Sven Fischer; Michael Greis	Russia Ivan Tcherezov; Nikolay Kruglov; Pavel Rostovtsev; Sergei Tchepikov	France Julien Robert; Vincent Defrasne; Ferréol Cannard; Raphael Poiree
4	4 January 2006	(Germany) Oberhof	4x7.5 km Relay	Germany Ricco Gross; Alexander Wolf; Sven Fischer; Michael Greis	Russia Sergei Rozhkov; Pavel Rostovtsev; Ivan Tcherezov; Nikolay Kruglov	Belarus Alexei Aidarov; Sergey Novikov; Vladimir Drachev; Oleg Ryzhenkov
5	12 January 2006	(Germany) Ruhpolding	4x7.5 km Relay	Germany Michael Rösch; Alexander Wolf; Sven Fischer; Michael Greis	Austria Daniel Mesotitsch; Wolfgang Perner; Ludwig Gredler; Christoph Sumann	Norway Halvard Hanevold; Emil Hegle Svendsen; Frode Andresen; Stian Eckhoff
OG	21 February 2006	(Italy) Turin	4x7.5 km Relay	Germany Ricco Gross; Michael Rösch; Sven Fischer; Michael Greis	Russia Ivan Tcherezov; Sergei Tchepikov; Pavel Rostovtsev; Nikolay Kruglov	France Julien Robert; Vincent Defrasne; Ferréol Cannard; Raphael Poiree

=== Women's team ===
Event	Date	Place	Discipline	Winner	Second	Third
1	29 November 2005	(Sweden) Östersund	4x6 km Relay	Norway Liv Grete Poiree; Gro Marit Istad-Kristiansen; Gunn Margit Andreassen; Linda Tjorhom	France Delphyne Peretto; Christelle Gros; Florence Baverel-Robert; Sandrine Bailly	Russia Olga Pyleva; Svetlana Ishmouratova; Natalia Guseva; Anna Bogaliy-Titovets
2	10 December 2005	(Austria) Hochfilzen	4x6 km Relay	Norway Liv Grete Poiree; Gro Marit Istad-Kristiansen; Gunn Margit Andreassen; Linda Tjorhom	Russia Olga Pyleva; Svetlana Ishmouratova; Albina Akhatova; Olga Zaitseva	Germany Martina Glagow; Simone Denkinger; Katrin Apel; Kati Wilhelm
4	5 January 2006	(Germany) Oberhof	4x6 km Relay	France Delphyne Peretto; Florence Baverel-Robert; Sylvie Becaert; Sandrine Bailly	Germany Uschi Disl; Andrea Henkel; Katrin Apel; Kati Wilhelm	Belarus Ekaterina Ivanova; Olga Nazarova; Lyudmila Ananko; Olena Zubrilova
5	11 January 2006	(Germany) Ruhpolding	4x6 km Relay	Russia Anna Bogaliy-Titovets; Svetlana Ishmouratova; Albina Akhatova; Olga Zaitseva	Germany Martina Glagow; Andrea Henkel; Katrin Apel; Simone Denkinger	Slovenia Teja Gregorin; Andreja Mali; Andreja Koblar; Tadeja Brankovič
OG	23 February 2006	(Italy) Turin	4x6 km Relay	Russia Anna Bogaliy-Titovets; Svetlana Ishmouratova; Olga Zaitseva; Albina Akhatova	Germany Martina Glagow; Andrea Henkel; Katrin Apel; Kati Wilhelm	France Delphyne Peretto; Florence Baverel-Robert; Sylvie Becaert; Sandrine Bailly

=== Mixed ===
Event	Date	Place	Discipline	Winner	Second	Third
WC	12 March 2006	(Slovenia) Pokljuka	2x6 km + 2x7.5 km Mixed Relay	Russia Anna Bogaliy-Titovets; Sergei Tchepikov; Irina Malgina; Nikolay Kruglov	Norway Linda Tjorhom; Halvard Hanevold; Tora Berger; Ole Einar Bjørndalen	France Florence Baverel-Robert; Vincent Defrasne; Sandrine Bailly; Raphaël Poirée

== Standings: Men ==
=== Overall ===
Pos.		Points
1.	(Norway) Ole Einar Bjørndalen	814
2.	(France) Raphaël Poirée	695
3.	(Germany) Sven Fischer	674
4.	(Poland) Tomasz Sikora	606
5.	(Germany) Michael Rösch	573

- Final standings after 26 races.

=== Individual ===
Pos.		Points
1.	(Germany) Michael Greis	133
2.	(Norway) Ole Einar Bjørndalen	92
3.	(France) Raphaël Poirée	83
4.	(Germany) Sven Fischer	77
5.	(Norway) Halvard Hanevold	77

- Final standings after 3 races.

=== Sprint ===
Pos.		Points
1.	(Poland) Tomasz Sikora	257
2.	(Norway) Ole Einar Bjørndalen	253
3.	(France) Raphaël Poirée	245
4.	(Germany) Sven Fischer	232
5.	(France) Vincent Defrasne	230

- Final standings after 10 races.

=== Pursuit ===
Pos.		Points
1.	(Norway) Ole Einar Bjørndalen	283
2.	(Germany) Sven Fischer	229
3.	(France) Raphaël Poirée	200
4.	(France) Vincent Defrasne	198
5.	(Germany) Michael Rösch	195

- Final standings after 8 races.

=== Mass Start ===
Pos.		Points
1.	(Norway) Ole Einar Bjørndalen	186
2.	(France) Raphaël Poirée	157
3.	(Poland) Tomasz Sikora	140
4.	(Germany) Sven Fischer	124
5.	(Russia) Maxim Tchoudov	120

- Final standings after 5 races.

=== Relay ===
Pos.		Points
1.	Germany	200
2.	Russia	184
3.	France	169
4.	Norway	164
5.	Belarus	147

- Final standings after 5 races.

=== Nation ===
Pos.		Points
1.	Germany	5843
2.	Norway	5531
3.	Russia	5462
4.	France	5067
5.	Austria	4668

- Final standings after 19 races.

== Standings: Women ==
=== Overall ===
Pos.		Points
1.	(Germany) Kati Wilhelm	969
2.	(Sweden) Anna Carin Olofsson	818
3.	(Germany) Martina Glagow	694
4.	(France) Sandrine Bailly	674
5.	(Germany) Uschi Disl	580

- Final standings after 26 races.

=== Individual ===
Pos.		Points
1.	(Russia) Svetlana Ishmouratova	100
2.	(Russia) Albina Akhatova	99
3.	(Sweden) Anna Carin Olofsson	96
4.	(Germany) Martina Glagow	80
5.	(France) Sandrine Bailly	74

- Final standings after 3 races.

=== Sprint ===
Pos.		Points
1.	(Germany) Kati Wilhelm	368
2.	(Sweden) Anna Carin Olofsson	333
3.	(Russia) Svetlana Ishmouratova	244
4.	(France) Sandrine Bailly	242
5.	(Germany) Martina Glagow	220

- Final standings after 10 races.

=== Pursuit ===
Pos.		Points
1.	(Germany) Kati Wilhelm	334
2.	(Sweden) Anna Carin Olofsson	254
3.	(France) Sandrine Bailly	221
4.	(Germany) Martina Glagow	209
5.	(Germany) Katrin Apel	195

- Final standings after 8 races.

=== Mass Start ===
Pos.		Points
1.	(Germany) Martina Glagow	170
2.	(Germany) Kati Wilhelm	169
3.	(Norway) Linda Tjørhom	142
4.	(Germany) Uschi Disl	141
5.	(Sweden) Anna Carin Olofsson	135

- Final standings after 5 races.

=== Relay ===
Pos.		Points
1.	Russia	189
2.	Germany	181
3.	France	179
4.	Norway	171
5.	Slovenia	157

- Final standings after 5 races.

=== Nation ===
Pos.		Points
1.	Germany	5758
2.	Russia	5631
3.	France	5242
4.	Norway	5082
5.	Belarus	4942

- Final standings after 19 races.

== Medal table ==
Rank	Nation	Gold	Silver	Bronze	Total
1	Germany	22	21	18	61
2	Norway	19	7	9	35
3	France	7	13	8	28
4	Sweden	7	2	4	13
5	Russia	6	11	13	30
6	Poland	1	3	0	4
7	Belarus	1	1	5	7
8	Slovenia	0	1	3	4
9	Latvia	0	1	1	2
10	Austria	0	1	0	1
10	Czech Republic	0	1	0	1
10	Italy	0	1	0	1
13	Ukraine	0	0	2	2
Totals (13 entries)		63	63	63	189

== Achievements ==
Victory in this World Cup (all-time number of victories in parentheses)

Men

- Ole Einar Bjørndalen (NOR), 8 (63) first places
- Sven Fischer (GER), 3 (33) first places
- Frode Andresen (NOR), 3 (15) first places
- Michael Greis (GER), 2 (3) first places
- Vincent Defrasne (FRA), 2 (2) first places
- Raphaël Poirée (FRA), 1 (38) first place
- Halvard Hanevold (NOR), 1 (9) first place
- Ricco Groß (GER), 1 (9) first place
- Stian Eckhoff (NOR), 1 (2) first place
- Alexander Wolf (GER), 1 (2) first place
- Tomasz Sikora (POL), 1 (2) first place
- Michael Rösch (GER), 1 (1) first place
- Carl Johan Bergman (SWE), 1 (1) first place

Women

- Kati Wilhelm (GER), 6 (15) first places
- Anna Carin Olofsson (SWE), 6 (6) first places
- Martina Glagow (GER), 3 (9) first places
- Sandrine Bailly (FRA), 2 (15) first places
- Linda Tjørhom (NOR), 2 (5) first places
- Svetlana Ishmouratova (RUS), 2 (2) first places
- Uschi Disl (GER), 1 (30) first place
- Liv Grete Poirée (NOR), 1 (22) first place
- Olena Zubrilova (BLR), 1 (21) first place
- Olga Zaitseva (RUS), 1 (6) first place
- Florence Baverel-Robert (FRA), 1 (1) first place

== Retirements ==
The following notable biathletes retired after the 2005–06 season:

- Wolfgang Perner (AUT)
- Wolfgang Rottmann (AUT)
- Oleg Ryzhenkov (BLR)
- Vadim Sashurin (BLR)
- Vladimir Drachev (BLR)
- Matjaž Poklukar (SLO)
- Pavel Rostovtsev (RUS)
- Ruslan Lysenko (UKR)
- Olena Zubrilova (BLR)
- Ekaterina Dafovska (BUL)
- Sun Ribo (CHN)
- Kateřina Holubcová (CZE)
- Outi Kettunen (FIN)
- Katja Beer (GER)
- Uschi Disl (GER)
- Tamami Tanaka (JPN)
- Liv Grete Poiree (NOR)
- Svetlana Ishmouratova (RUS)
- Svetlana Tchernousova (RUS)
- Andreja Koblar (SLO)
- Anna Murínová (SVK)
- Marcela Pavkovčekova (SVK)
- Irina Tananaiko (UKR)
- Rachel Steer (USA)
