= Ekaterina Dafovska =

Bulgarian biathlete

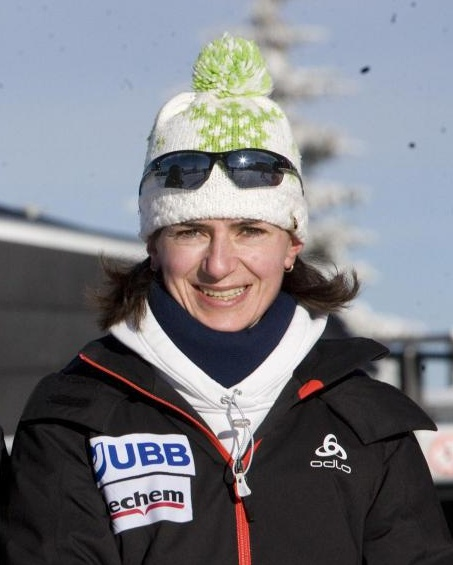

Medal record

Women's biathlon

Representing Bulgaria

Olympic Games
Gold medal – first place	1998 Nagano	15 km individual

World Championships
Bronze medal – third place	1995 Antholz-Anterselva	15 km individual
Bronze medal – third place	1997 Brezno-Osrblie	15 km individual

Ekaterina Stefanova Dafovska (Bulgarian: Екатерина Стефанова Дафовска; born 28 November 1975 in Chepelare, Bulgaria) is a Bulgarian former biathlete. She took up the biathlon in 1990. She made the national team in 1993 and came in 29th in the 15-kilometer competition at the Lillehammer Olympics the following year.

She won a gold Olympic medal at the 15 km Individual event during the 1998 Winter Olympics in Nagano. She was named the 1998 Bulgarian Sportsperson of the Year. She was also named the 1998 BTA Best Balkan Athlete of the Year. As of 2026, her gold medal is the only one won by a Bulgarian at a Winter Olympic Games.

Dafovska is an administrator from Chepelare.

== Biathlon Results ==
=== Olympic Games ===
1 medal (1 gold, 0 silver, 0 bronze)

Event	Individual	Sprint	Pursuit	Mass start	Relay
(Norway) 1994 Lillehammer	—N/a	29th	—N/a	—N/a	13th
(Japan) 1998 Nagano	Gold	29th	—N/a	—N/a	16th
(United States) 2002 Salt Lake City	5th	10th	15th	—N/a	4th
(Italy) 2006 Turin	11th	33rd	28th	8th	8th

*Pursuit was first added in 2002, mass start in 2006.

=== World Championships ===
2 medals (0 gold, 0 silver, 2 bronze)

Event	Individual	Sprint	Pursuit	Mass start	Relay	Team
(Italy) 1995 Anterholt	Bronze	31st	—N/a	7th	—N/a	—N/a
(Slovakia) 1997 Brezno-Osrblie	Bronze	5th	19th	11th	—N/a	8th
(Finland) 1999 Kohtilanti	—N/a	14th	14th	—N/a	9th	—N/a
(Norway) 1999 Oslo	10th	—N/a	—N/a	6th	—N/a	—N/a
(Slovenia) 2001 Pokljuka	18th	18th	10th	18th	6th	—N/a
(Norway) 2002 Oslo	—N/a	—N/a	—N/a	4th	—N/a	—N/a
(Russia) 2003 Khanty-Mansisyk	8th	29th	25th	11th	7th	—N/a
(Germany) 2004 Oberhof	17th	21st	16th	6th	6th	—N/a
(Austria) 2005 Hochfilzen	5th	—N/a	12th	22nd	8th	—N/a

*Team was removed as an event in 1998 and pursuit was added in 1997 with mass relay first being added in 1999.

=== World Cup ===
Season	Overall
1993-94	38th
1994-95	25th
1995-96	47th
1996-97	17th
1997-98	16th
1998-99	11th
2000-01	19th
2001-02	11th
2002-03	4th
2003-04	14th
2004-05	21st
2005-06	27th

=== Individual Victories ===
4 victories {1 In, 1 Sp, 2 Pu)

Season	Date	Location	Discipline	Level
2002-03; 4 victories (1 In, 1 Sp, 2 Pu)	22 December 2002	(Slovakia) Brezno-Osrblie	10km Pursuit	Biathlon World Cup
2002-03; 4 victories (1 In, 1 Sp, 2 Pu)	8 January 2003	(Germany) Oberhof	7.5km Sprint	Biathlon World Cup
2002-03; 4 victories (1 In, 1 Sp, 2 Pu)	19 January 2003	(Germany) Ruhpolding	10km Pursuit	Biathlon World Cup
2002-03; 4 victories (1 In, 1 Sp, 2 Pu)	23 January 2003	(Italy) Antholz-Anterselva	15km Individual	Biathlon World Cup
