= Rustam Valiullin =

Belarusian biathlete (born 1976)

Rustam Abdelsamatovich Valiullin
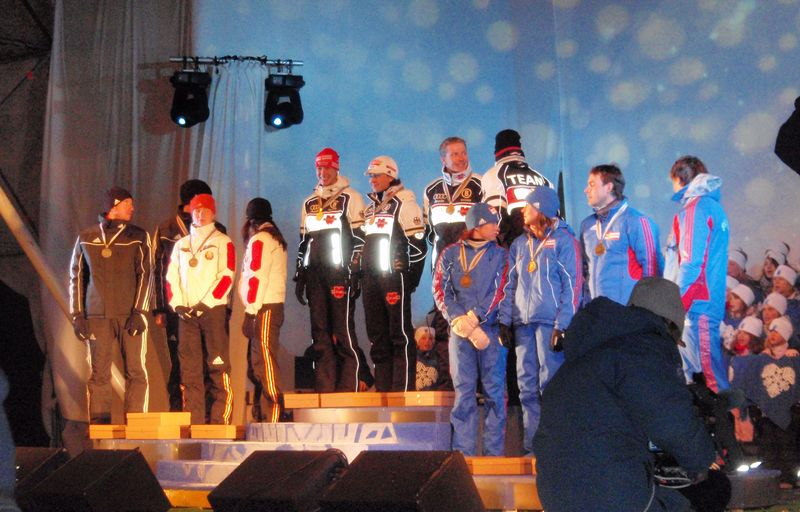

Personal information
- Born: 24 June 1976 (age 50) Ulyanovsk, RSFSR, USSR

Sport
- Sport: Skiing
Medal record
Men's biathlon
Representing Belarus
World Championships
Silver medal – second place	2003 Khanty-Mansiysk	Relay
Silver medal – second place	2008 Östersund	Mixed relay
- Updated on 28 February 2013

Rustam Valiullin (born 24 June 1976 in Ulianovsk) is a retired Belarusian biathlete.

He competed in the 2002, 2006 and 2010 Winter Olympics for Belarus. His best finish is 11th, as a member of the Belarusian relay team in 2006 and 2010. His best individual performance is 24th, in the 2006 sprint.

As of March 2013, he has won two medals at the Biathlon World Championships, both in relays; bronze in the men's in 2003 and silver in the mixed in 2008. His best individual performance in a World Championships is 7th, in the 2004 individual.

As of March 2013, he has earned four Biathlon World Cup victories, all in the men's relay. His best individual finish is from 2006/07, 5th in the individual event at Lahti in 2004/05. His best overall finish in the Biathlon World Cup is 32nd, in 2005/06 .

== World Cup podiums ==
Season	Location	Event	Rank
2001/02	Lahti	Relay	3rd place, bronze medalist(s)
2002/03	Östersund	Relay	1st place, gold medalist(s)
2002/03	Oberhof	Relay	2nd place, silver medalist(s)
2002/03	Antholz	Relay	1st place, gold medalist(s)
2002/03	Holmenkollen	Relay	1st place, gold medalist(s)
2004/05	Hochfilzen	Relay	2nd place, silver medalist(s)
2004/05	Ruhpolding	Relay	1st place, gold medalist(s)
