= Nina Klenovska =

Bulgarian biathlete (born 1980)

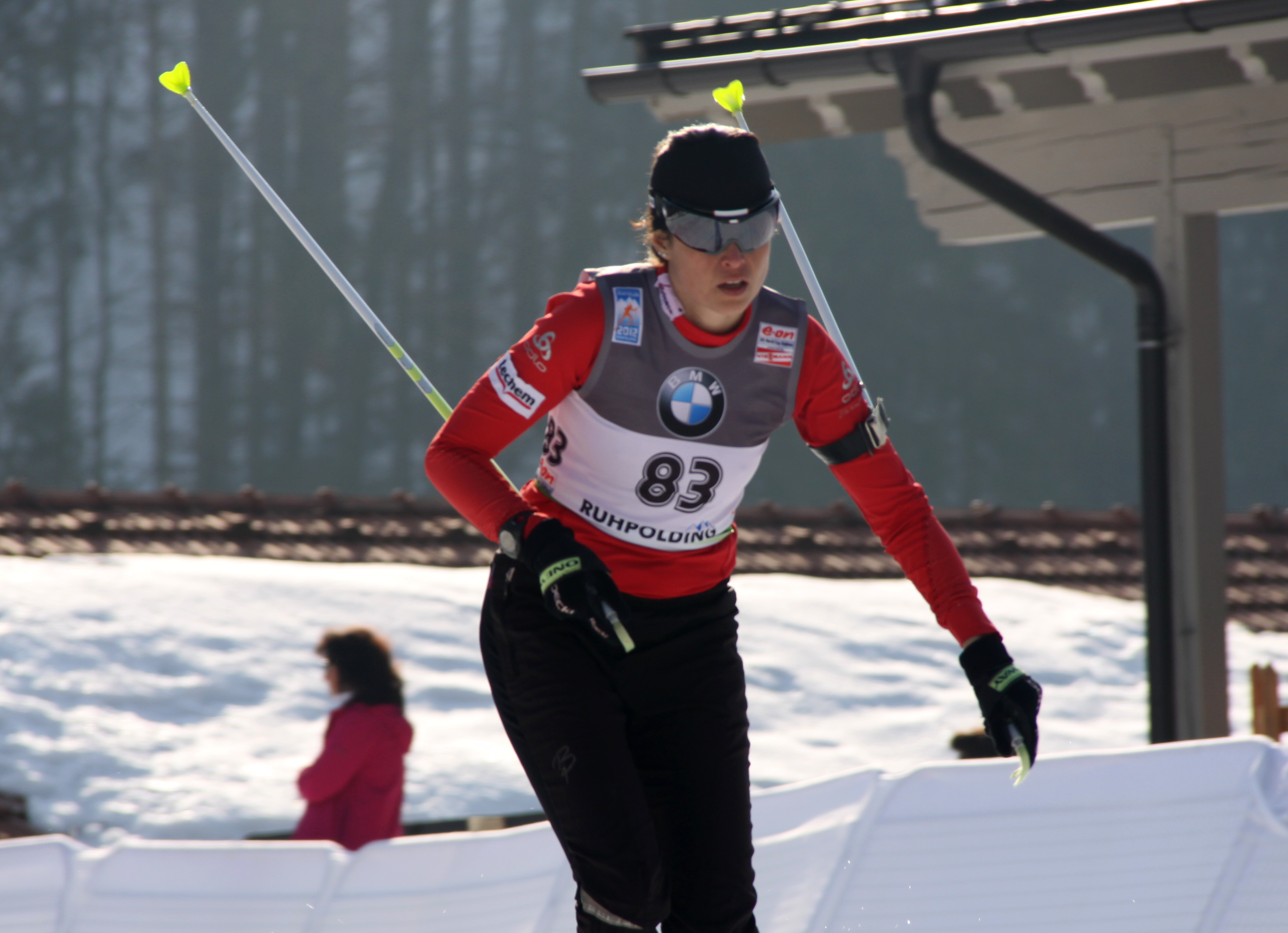

Personal information
- Born: 7 May 1980 (age 46) Bansko, Bulgaria

Sport
- Sport: Skiing
Medal record
Junior World Championships
Bronze medal – third place	2000 Hochfilzen	10 km pursuit
- Updated on 28 February 2013

Nina Klenovska (Bulgarian: Нина Кленовска) (born 7 May 1980 in Bansko), previously Nina Kadeva (Bulgarian: Нина Кадева) is a Bulgarian biathlete.

Klenovska competed in the 2006 and 2010 Winter Olympics for Bulgaria. Her best performance was 48th in the 2010 individual. She also finished 54th in the 2006 individual and 62nd in the 2010 sprint.

As of February 2013, her best performance at the Biathlon World Championships is 6th, as part of the 2009 Finnish mixed relay team. Her best individual performance is 50th, in the individual races in 2003 and 2012.

As of February 2013, Klenovska has finished on the podium once in the Biathlon World Cup, as part of the Bulgarian women's relay team at Östersund in 2002/03. Her best individual result is 25th, in the sprint at Antholz in 2010/11. Her best overall finish in the Biathlon World Cup is 64th, in 2002/03.

== World Cup podiums ==
Season	Location	Event	Rank
2002/03	Östersund	Relay	3rd place, bronze medalist(s)
