= Alexander Wolf =

German biathlete (born 1978)

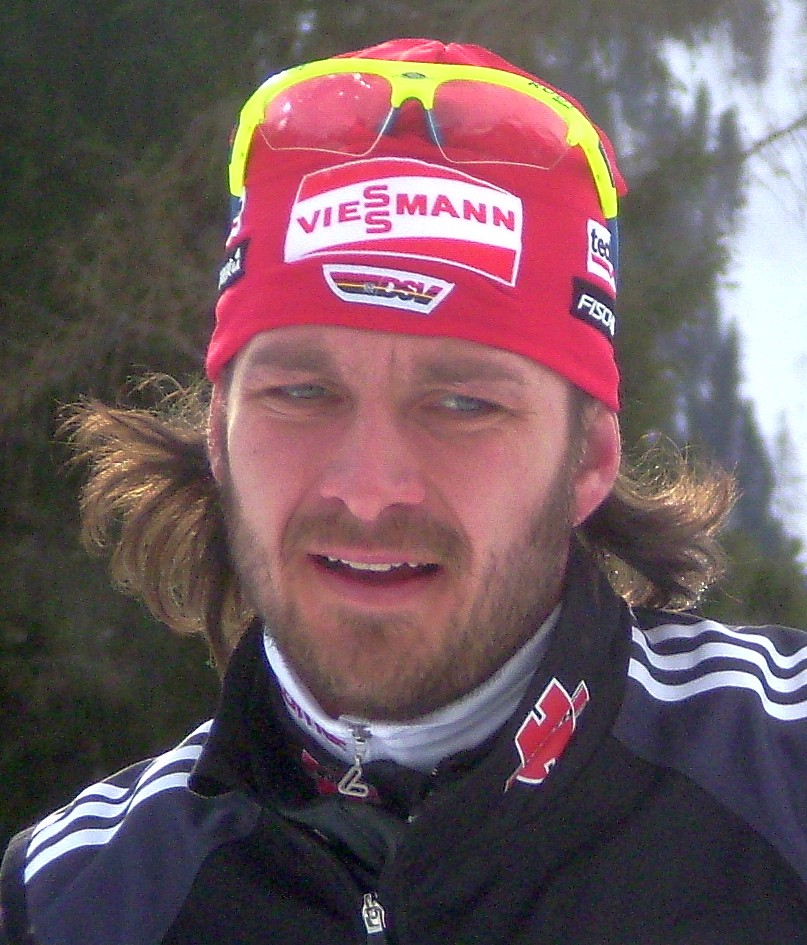

Personal information
- Full name: Alexander Wolf
- Born: 21 December 1978 (age 47) Schmalkalden, Thuringia, East Germany
- Height: 1.91 m (6 ft 3 in)
- Website: aliwolf.de

Sport

Professional information
- Sport: Biathlon
- Club: WSV Oberhof 05
- World Cup debut: 11 December 1998

Olympic Games
- Teams: 3 (2002, 2006, 2010)
- Medals: 0

World Championships
- Teams: 6 (2000, 2004, 2005, 2007, 2008, 2009)
- Medals: 2 (0 gold)

World Cup
- Seasons: 13 (1998/99–2010/11)
- Individual victories: 3
- All victories: 8
- Individual podiums: 13
- All podiums: 28
Medal record
Representing Germany
Men's biathlon
World Championships
Bronze medal – third place	2008 Östersund	12.5 km pursuit
Bronze medal – third place	2008 Östersund	4 × 7.5 km relay
Junior World Championships
Gold medal – first place	1997 Forni Avoltri	4 × 7.5 km relay
Gold medal – first place	1998 Jericho/Valcartier	Relay
Silver medal – second place	1998 Jericho/Valcartier	Team

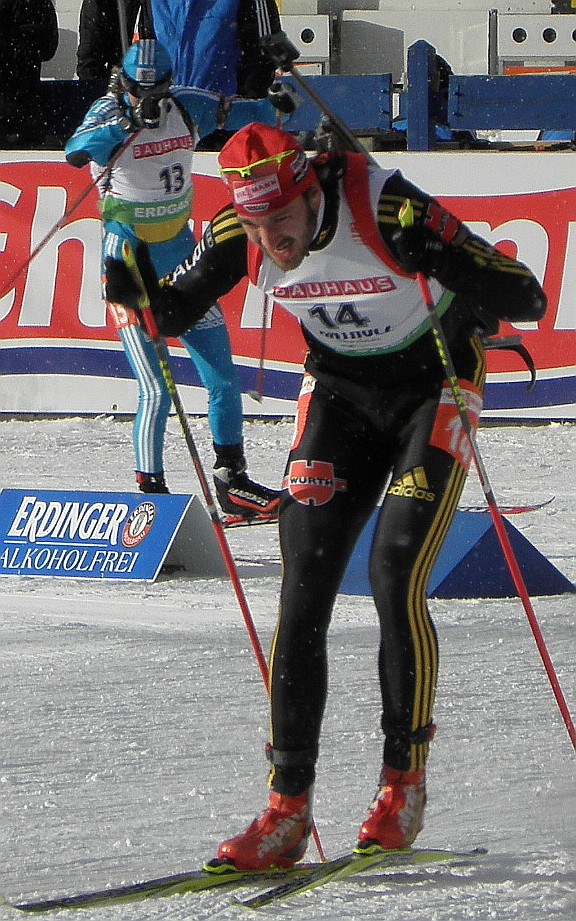
Alexander Wolf.

Alexander Wolf (born 21 December 1978) is a former German biathlete. At the 2008 World Championships in Östersund, he won bronze medals in the 12.5 km pursuit and the 4 × 7.5 km relay.

== Biathlon results ==
All results are sourced from the International Biathlon Union.

=== Olympic Games ===
Event	Individual	Sprint	Pursuit	Mass start	Relay
(United States) 2002 Salt Lake City	34th	—	—	—N/a	—
(Italy) 2006 Turin	—	14th	19th	8th	—
(Canada) 2010 Vancouver	24th	—	—	—	—

*Mass start was added as an event in 2006.

=== World Championships ===
2 medals (2 bronze)

Event	Individual	Sprint	Pursuit	Mass start	Relay	Mixed relay
(Norway) 2000 Oslo Holmenkollen	8th	—	—	—	—	—N/a
(Germany) 2004 Oberhof	53rd	—	—	—	—	—N/a
(Austria) 2005 Hochfilzen	—	—	—	—	6th	17th
(Italy) 2007 Antholz-Anterselva	13th	15th	14th	14th	—	5th
(Sweden) 2008 Östersund	19th	19th	Bronze	14th	Bronze	—
(South Korea) 2009 Pyeongchang	30th	53rd	18th	—	—	—

*During Olympic seasons competitions are only held for those events not included in the Olympic program.
**The mixed relay was added as an event in 2005.

=== Individual victories ===
3 victories (3 Sp)

Season	Date	Location	Discipline	Level
2002–03; 1 victory (1 Sp)	8 February 2003	(Finland) Lahti	10 km sprint	Biathlon World Cup
2005–06; 1 victory (1 Sp)	16 December 2005	(Slovakia) Brezno-Osrblie	10 km sprint	Biathlon World Cup
2006–07; 1 victory (1 Sp)	18 January 2007	(Slovenia) Pokljuka	10 km sprint	Biathlon World Cup

*Results are from UIPMB and IBU races which include the Biathlon World Cup, Biathlon World Championships and the Winter Olympic Games.
