= Ricco Groß =

German biathlete (born 1970)

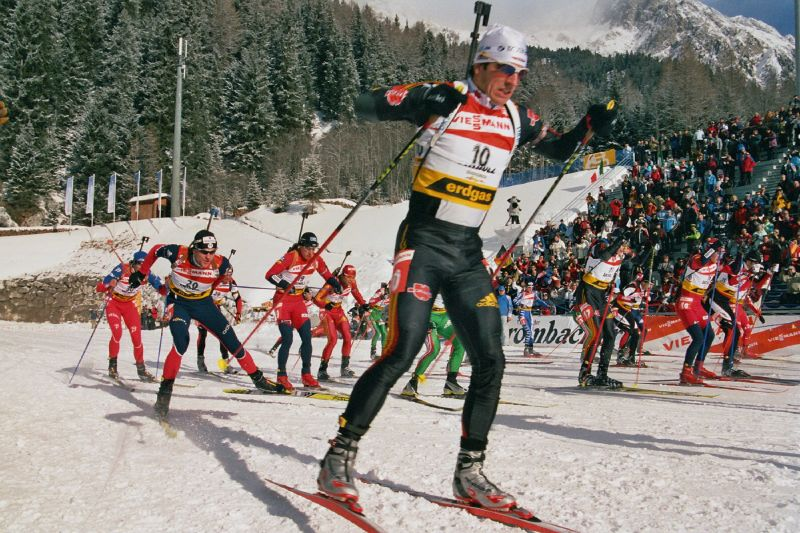
- Groß in Antholz-Anterselva in 2006.

Personal information
- Born: 22 August 1970 (age 55) Bad Schlema, East Germany
- Height: 1.78 m (5 ft 10 in)
- Website: Ricco-Gross.de

Sport

Professional information
- Sport: Biathlon
- Club: Ski Club Ruhpolding
- Retired: 18 March 2007

Olympic Games
- Teams: 5 (1992, 1994, 1998, 2002, 2006)
- Medals: 8 (4 gold)

World Championships
- Teams: 15 (1991, 1993, 1995, 1996, 1997, 1998, 1999, 2000, 2001, 2002, 2003, 2004, 2005, 2006, 2007)
- Medals: 20 (9 gold)

World Cup
- Seasons: 17 (1990/91–2006/07)
- Individual victories: 9
- All victories: 33
- Individual podiums: 52
- All podiums: 95
- Discipline titles: 1: 1 Individual (1996–97)
Medal record
Men's biathlon
Representing Germany
Olympic Games
Gold medal – first place	1992 Albertville	4 × 7.5 km relay
Gold medal – first place	1994 Lillehammer	4 × 7.5 km relay
Gold medal – first place	1998 Nagano	4 × 7.5 km relay
Gold medal – first place	2006 Turin	4 × 7.5 km relay
Silver medal – second place	1992 Albertville	10 km sprint
Silver medal – second place	1994 Lillehammer	10 km sprint
Silver medal – second place	2002 Salt Lake City	4 × 7.5 km relay
Bronze medal – third place	2002 Salt Lake City	12.5 km pursuit
World Championships
Gold medal – first place	1991 Lahti	4 × 7.5 km relay
Gold medal – first place	1995 Antholz-Anterselva	4 × 7.5 km relay
Gold medal – first place	1997 Brezno-Osrblie	20 km individual
Gold medal – first place	1997 Brezno-Osrblie	4 × 7.5 km relay
Gold medal – first place	1999 Kontiolahti	12.5 km pursuit
Gold medal – first place	2003 Khanty-Mansiysk	12.5 km pursuit
Gold medal – first place	2003 Khanty-Mansiysk	4 × 7.5 km relay
Gold medal – first place	2004 Oberhof	12.5 km pursuit
Gold medal – first place	2004 Oberhof	4 × 7.5 km relay
Silver medal – second place	1996 Ruhpolding	4 × 7.5 km relay
Silver medal – second place	1998 Hochfilzen	Team event
Silver medal – second place	1999 Oslo	20 km individual
Silver medal – second place	2003 Khanty-Mansiysk	10 km sprint
Silver medal – second place	2004 Oberhof	10 km sprint
Bronze medal – third place	1995 Antholz-Anterselva	10 km sprint
Bronze medal – third place	2000 Lahti	4 × 7.5 km relay
Bronze medal – third place	2003 Khanty-Mansiysk	20 km individual
Bronze medal – third place	2005 Hochfilzen	20 km individual
Bronze medal – third place	2005 Khanty-Mansiysk	Mixed relay
Bronze medal – third place	2007 Antholz-Anterselva	4 × 7.5 km relay

Ricco Groß (also spelled Gross, born 22 August 1970) is a German former biathlete. He is one of the most successful biathletes of all time at the Winter Olympics and the World Championships.

== Personal life ==
He has been married to his wife Kathrin since 1994 and they have three sons: Marco (born 1995), Simon (b. 1998), and Gabriel (b. 2004). He is a Hauptfeldwebel (Sergeant First Class) in the German Bundeswehr.

== Career ==
Groß started out as a cross-country skier but switched to biathlon at the age of 13. He made his World Cup debut at the age of 20. His first club was the SG Dynamo Klingenthal until 1991. In the Biathlon World Cup of 1997/1998, he came second in the overall competition. In the biathlon competition at the 1992, 1994, and 1998 Winter Olympics, he won gold medals as part of the men's 4 × 7.5 km relay team. At the 2002 Winter Olympics in the 4 × 7.5 km relay for men the German team won silver and at the 12.5 km pursuit for men, he won bronze for himself. He took a total of eight Olympic medals during his career, including four relay golds.

In the Biathlon World Championships sprint (10 km) he won bronze in 1995, and silver in 2003 and 2004. In 1999, 2003, and 2004, he won gold in the pursuit (12.5 km). In the individual (20 km), he won gold in 1997, silver in 1999, and bronze in 2003 and 2005. He took a total of nine World Championship titles. Groß took a total of 53 individual podium finishes in World Cup competition, including nine race wins.

After retiring from competition Groß settled in Ruhpolding. He has worked as a commentator on biathlon for German television and was appointed as coach of the German women's biathlon team in 2010. He was subsequently announced as senior trainer for the German IBU Cup team in April 2014. In August 2015 he became a senior coach for the Russian men's biathlon squad, agreeing a contract up to the 2017-18 season. In this role he guided the team to the 2016-17 relay World Cup title. In May 2018, Groß was announced as head coach for the Austrian men's biathlon team.

== Biathlon results ==
All results are sourced from the International Biathlon Union.

=== Olympic Games ===
8 medals (4 gold, 3 silver, 1 bronze)

Event	Individual	Sprint	Pursuit	Mass start	Relay
(France) 1992 Albertville	—	Silver	—N/a	—N/a	Gold
(Norway) 1994 Lillehammer	—	Silver	—N/a	—N/a	Gold
(Japan) 1998 Nagano	6th	17th	—N/a	—N/a	Gold
(United States) 2002 Salt Lake City	4th	4th	Bronze	—N/a	Silver
(Italy) 2006 Turin	11th	6th	12th	—	Gold

*Pursuit was added as an event in 2002, with mass start being added in 2006.

=== World Championships ===
20 medals (9 gold, 5 silver, 6 bronze)

Event	Individual	Sprint	Pursuit	Mass start	Team	Relay	Mixed relay
(Finland) 1991 Lahti	—	16th	—N/a	—N/a	4th	Gold	—N/a
(Bulgaria) 1993 Borovets	6th	64th	—N/a	—N/a	—	—	—N/a
(Italy) 1995 Antholz-Anterselva	55th	Bronze	—N/a	—N/a	14th	Gold	—N/a
(Germany) 1996 Ruhpolding	9th	12th	—N/a	—N/a	6th	Silver	—N/a
(Slovakia) 1997 Brezno-Osrblie	Gold	34th	26th	—N/a	—	Gold	—N/a
(Slovenia) 1998 Pokljuka	—N/a	—N/a	7th	—N/a	Silver	—N/a	—N/a
(Finland) 1999 Kontiolahti	Silver	6th	Gold	8th	—N/a	4th	—N/a
(Norway) 2000 Oslo Holmenkollen	9th	7th	18th	6th	—N/a	Bronze	—N/a
(Slovenia) 2001 Pokljuka	7th	27th	14th	4th	—N/a	12th	—N/a
(Norway) 2002 Oslo Holmenkollen	—N/a	—N/a	—N/a	11th	—N/a	—N/a	—N/a
(Russia) 2003 Khanty-Mansiysk	Bronze	Silver	Gold	22nd	—N/a	Gold	—N/a
(Germany) 2004 Oberhof	4th	Silver	Gold	29th	—N/a	Gold	—N/a
(Austria) 2005 Hochfilzen	Bronze	7th	6th	7th	—N/a	6th	Bronze
(Slovenia) 2006 Pokljuka	—N/a	—N/a	—N/a	—N/a	—N/a	—N/a	10th
(Italy) 2007 Antholz-Anterselva	9th	—	—	—	—N/a	Bronze	—

*During Olympic seasons competitions are only held for those events not included in the Olympic program.
**Team was removed as an event in 1998, and pursuit was added in 1997 with mass start being added in 1999 and the mixed relay in 2005.

=== Individual victories ===
9 victories (3 In, 1 Sp, 4 Pu, 1 MS)

Season	Date	Location	Discipline	Level
1996–97; 2 victories (2 In)	9 January 1997	(Germany) Ruhpolding	20 km individual	Biathlon World Cup
1996–97; 2 victories (2 In)	7 February 1997	(Slovakia) Brezno-Osrblie	20 km individual	Biathlon World Championships
1997–98; 1 victory (1 In)	3 March 1998	(Slovenia) Pokljuka	20 km individual	Biathlon World Cup
1998–99; 1 victory (1 Pu)	13 February 1999	(Finland) Kontiolahti	12.5 km pursuit	Biathlon World Championships
1999–2000; 2 victories (1 Sp, 1 MS)	12 January 2000	(Germany) Ruhpolding	15 km mass start	Biathlon World Cup
1999–2000; 2 victories (1 Sp, 1 MS)	15 January 2000	(Germany) Ruhpolding	10 km sprint	Biathlon World Cup
2002–03; 1 victory (1 Pu)	16 March 2003	(Russia) Khanty-Mansiysk	12.5 km pursuit	Biathlon World Championships
2003–04; 1 victory (1 Pu)	8 February 2004	(Germany) Oberhof	12.5 km pursuit	Biathlon World Championships
2005–06; 1 victory (1 Pu)	20 January 2006	(Italy) Antholz-Anterselva	12.5 km pursuit	Biathlon World Cup

*Results are from UIPMB and IBU races which include the Biathlon World Cup, Biathlon World Championships and the Winter Olympic Games.

== See also ==
- List of multiple Olympic gold medalists
- List of multiple Olympic gold medalists in one event
