= Merkushyna =

Merkushyna is a Ukrainian surname. Notable people with the surname include:

- Anastasiya Merkushyna (born 1995), Ukrainian biathlete
- Iryna Merkushyna (born 1968), Ukrainian biathlete
- Oleksandra Merkushyna (born 2005), Ukrainian biathlete
