= Frode Andresen =

Norwegian biathlete and cross-country skier

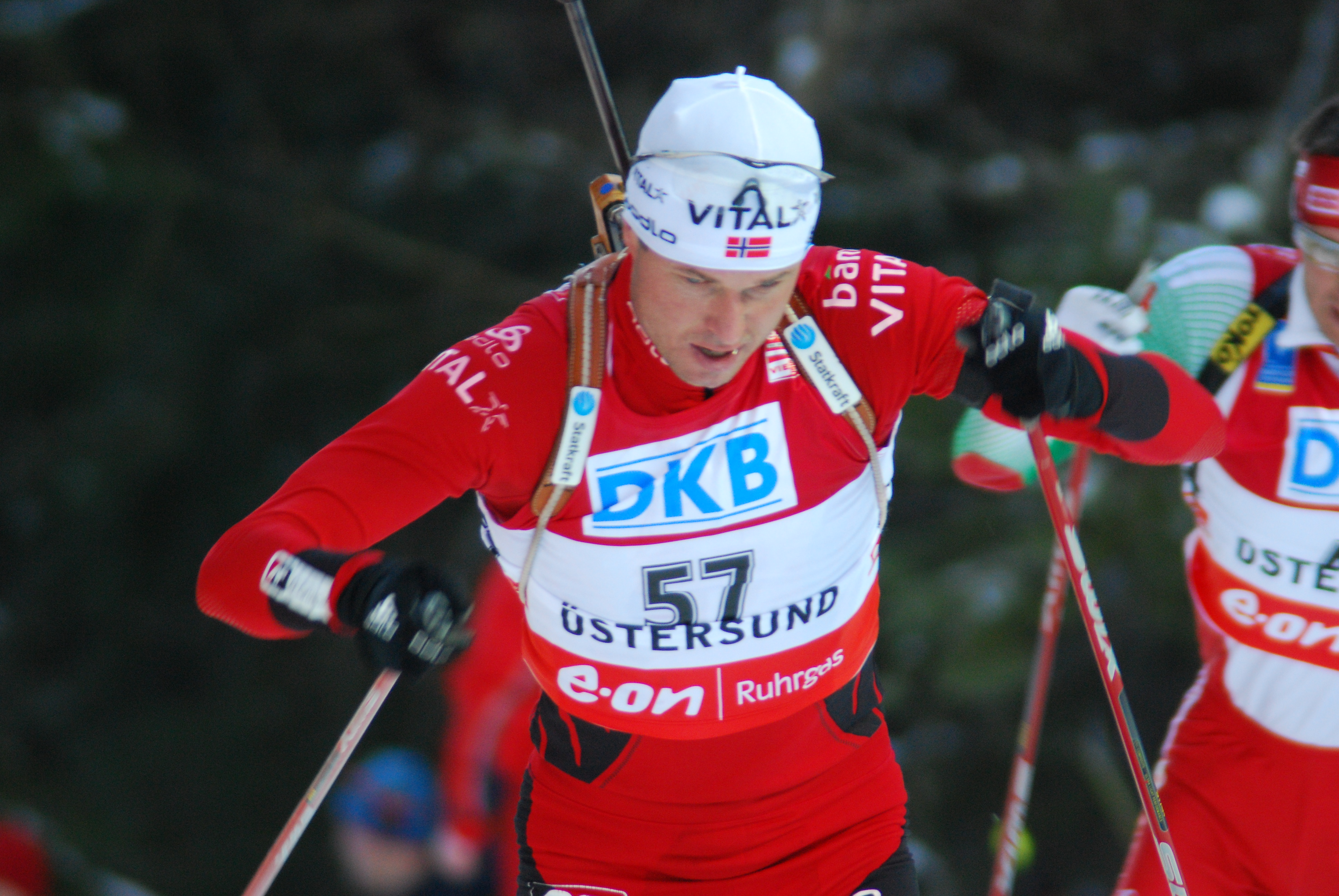
- Andresen in Östersund, 2008

Personal information
- Full name: Frode Andresen
- Born: 9 September 1973 (age 52) Rotterdam, Netherlands
- Height: 1.90 m (6 ft 3 in)

Sport

Professional information
- Sport: Biathlon
- Club: Ringkollen Skiklubb
- Skis: Atomic
- World Cup debut: 6 March 1993

Olympic Games
- Teams: 3 (1998, 2002, 2006)
- Medals: 3 (1 gold)

World Championships
- Teams: 14 (1995, 1996, 1997, 1998, 1999, 2000, 2001, 2002, 2003, 2004, 2005, 2006, 2007, 2008)
- Medals: 9 (2 gold)

World Cup
- Seasons: 20 (1992/93–2011/12)
- Individual victories: 15
- All victories: 28
- Individual podiums: 47
- All podiums: 84
Medal record
Men's biathlon
Representing Norway
Olympic Games
Gold medal – first place	2002 Salt Lake City	4 × 7.5 km relay
Silver medal – second place	1998 Nagano	10 km sprint
Bronze medal – third place	2006 Turin	10 km sprint
World Championships
Gold medal – first place	1995 Antholz-Anterselva	Team event
Gold medal – first place	2000 Oslo	10 km sprint
Silver medal – second place	2000 Lahti	4 × 7.5 km relay
Silver medal – second place	2007 Antholz-Anterselva	4 × 7.5 km relay
Bronze medal – third place	1999 Kontiolahti	10 km sprint
Bronze medal – third place	1999 Kontiolahti	4 × 7.5 km relay
Bronze medal – third place	2001 Pokljuka	4 × 7.5 km relay
Bronze medal – third place	2002 Oslo	15 km mass start
Bronze medal – third place	2007 Antholz-Anterselva	Mixed relay

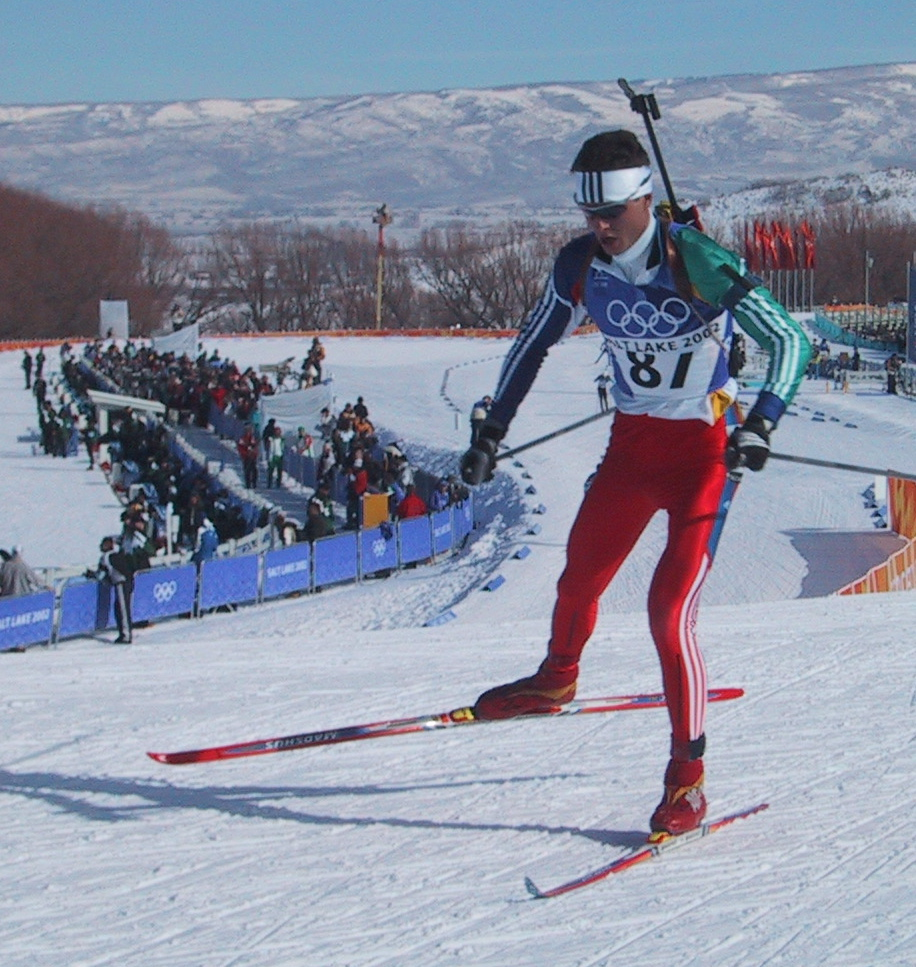
Frode competing in the 20km Individual at the 2002 Winter Olympics.

Frode Andresen (born 9 September 1973) is a Norwegian former biathlete and cross-country skier.

== Early life ==
Andresen was born in the Netherlands, and lived one year each in Cape Town, South Africa; Lagos, Nigeria; and Nairobi, Kenya, because of his parents' careers. They settled in Norway when Frode was four, and a year later he learned to cross-country ski, taking up biathlon at the age of twelve.

== Biathlon career ==
Andresen started competing in 1985 and has 15 World cup victories. In all Andresen had 47 podium finishes, 15 1st (including three wins at the Holmenkollen ski festival biathlon competition with two sprint wins (2000, 2001) and one pursuit (2001)), 15 2nd and 17 3rd places. On the January 22, 2006, Frode Andresen won the Golden Cup, which is a trophy awarded to the biathlete with the most points during the three world cup events after Christmas. Andresen is one of the fastest skiers in the field, but his shooting accuracy is questionable, his 03/04 season shooting statistics were 72% in the prone, and 67% standing, whilst the top biathletes are in the high 80% range.

On 14 February 2006 Andresen won the bronze medal in the 10 km sprint in the 2006 Winter Olympics in a time of 26:31.3, 19.7 seconds behind winner Sven Fischer of Germany, having missed one target out of ten. This gave him a complete set of medals in his olympic career.

Andresen's last competition at the World Cup level was the sprint in Hochfilzen 15 December 2011 in the 2011–12 season. Andresen's last competition at the IBU Cup level was the sprint in Beitostølen 1 December 2012 in the 2012–13 season.

== Cross-country career ==
A skilled and versatile skier, Andresen also participates in FIS cross-country skiing competitions. One of his best achievements in this sport is the first place in 20 km Freestyle race on 1999 Norwegian national championship which took place in Lillehammer.

== Personal life ==
Frode lives with fellow biathlete Gunn Margit Andreassen, and they had a son together, David, who was born around Christmas 2004, but died January 1, 2018. They also have two younger sons, Nicolai and Elias. He has a degree in economics and lists monitoring the stock market as a hobby of his. Frode is an avid cyclist, coming 26th at the 2002 Norwegian Championships in road cycling. As a child he cracked several teeth while skateboarding.

== Biathlon results ==
All results are sourced from the International Biathlon Union.

=== Olympic Games ===
3 medals (1 gold, 1 silver, 1 bronze)

Event	Individual	Sprint	Pursuit	Mass start	Relay
(Japan) 1998 Nagano	19th	Silver	—N/a	—N/a	—
(United States) 2002 Salt Lake City	7th	8th	14th	—N/a	Gold
(Italy) 2006 Turin	15th	Bronze	6th	19th	5th

*Pursuit was added as an event in 2002, with mass start being added in 2006.

=== World Championships ===
9 medals (2 gold, 2 silver, 5 bronze)

Event	Individual	Sprint	Pursuit	Mass start	Team	Relay	Mixed relay
(Italy) 1995 Antholz-Anterselva	—	10th	—N/a	—N/a	Gold	5th	—N/a
(Germany) 1996 Ruhpolding	—	5th	—N/a	—N/a	—	4th	—N/a
(Slovakia) 1997 Brezno-Osrblie	—	14th	19th	—N/a	—	—	—N/a
(Slovenia) 1998 Pokljuka	—N/a	—N/a	8th	—N/a	—	—N/a	—N/a
(Finland) 1999 Kontiolahti	53rd	Bronze	27th	6th	—N/a	Bronze	—N/a
(Norway) 2000 Oslo Holmenkollen	21st	Gold	6th	DSQ	—N/a	Silver	—N/a
(Slovenia) 2001 Pokljuka	—	8th	6th	16th	—N/a	Bronze	—N/a
(Norway) 2002 Oslo Holmenkollen	—N/a	—N/a	—N/a	Bronze	—N/a	—N/a	—N/a
(Russia) 2003 Khanty-Mansiysk	26th	6th	13th	21st	—N/a	4th	—N/a
(Germany) 2004 Oberhof	—	10th	15th	19th	—N/a	—	—N/a
(Austria) 2005 Hochfilzen	—	35th	35th	—	—N/a	—	—
(Slovenia) 2006 Pokljuka	—N/a	—N/a	—N/a	—N/a	—N/a	—N/a	23rd
(Italy) 2007 Antholz-Anterselva	4th	—	—	6th	—N/a	Silver	Bronze
(Sweden) 2008 Östersund	—	57th	42nd	—	—N/a	—	—

*During Olympic seasons competitions are only held for those events not included in the Olympic program.
**Team was removed as an event in 1998, and pursuit was added in 1997 with mass start being added in 1999 and the mixed relay in 2005.

=== Individual victories ===
15 victories (11 Sp, 4 Pu)

Season	Date	Location	Discipline	Level
1997–98; 1 victory (1 Sp)	10 January 1998	(Germany) Ruhpolding	10 km sprint	Biathlon World Cup
1998–99; 1 victory (1 Pu)	6 March 1999	(Canada) Valcartier	12.5 km pursuit	Biathlon World Cup
1999–2000; 6 victories (4 Sp, 2 Pu)	8 December 1999	(Slovenia) Pokljuka	10 km sprint	Biathlon World Cup
1999–2000; 6 victories (4 Sp, 2 Pu)	10 December 1999	(Slovenia) Pokljuka	12.5 km pursuit	Biathlon World Cup
1999–2000; 6 victories (4 Sp, 2 Pu)	17 December 1999	(Slovenia) Pokljuka	10 km sprint	Biathlon World Cup
1999–2000; 6 victories (4 Sp, 2 Pu)	11 February 2000	(Sweden) Östersund	10 km sprint	Biathlon World Cup
1999–2000; 6 victories (4 Sp, 2 Pu)	13 February 2000	(Sweden) Östersund	12.5 km pursuit	Biathlon World Cup
1999–2000; 6 victories (4 Sp, 2 Pu)	19 February 2000	(Norway) Oslo Holmenkollen	10 km sprint	Biathlon World Championships
2000–01; 3 victories (2 Sp, 1 Pu)	7 March 2001	(United States) Lake Placid	10 km sprint	Biathlon World Cup
2000–01; 3 victories (2 Sp, 1 Pu)	16 March 2001	(Norway) Oslo Holmenkollen	10 km sprint	Biathlon World Cup
2000–01; 3 victories (2 Sp, 1 Pu)	17 March 2001	(Norway) Oslo Holmenkollen	12.5 km pursuit	Biathlon World Cup
2002–03; 1 victory (1 Sp)	5 December 2002	(Sweden) Östersund	10 km sprint	Biathlon World Cup
2005–06; 3 victories (3 Sp)	10 December 2005	(Austria) Hochfilzen	10 km sprint	Biathlon World Cup
2005–06; 3 victories (3 Sp)	14 January 2006	(Germany) Ruhpolding	10 km sprint	Biathlon World Cup
2005–06; 3 victories (3 Sp)	19 January 2006	(Italy) Antholz-Anterselva	10 km sprint	Biathlon World Cup

*Results are from UIPMB and IBU races which include the Biathlon World Cup, Biathlon World Championships and the Winter Olympic Games.

== Cross-country skiing results ==
All results are sourced from the International Ski Federation (FIS).

=== World Cup ===
==== Season standings ====
Season	Age	Discipline standings				Ski Tour standings	
Season	Age	Overall	Distance	Long Distance	Sprint	Tour de Ski	World Cup Final
1999	25	108	—N/a	71	—	—N/a	—N/a
2001	27	83	—N/a	—N/a	—	—N/a	—N/a
2004	30	110	71	—N/a	—	—N/a	—N/a
2005	31	133	85	—N/a	—	—N/a	—N/a
2008	34	90	56	—N/a	—	—	—
2010	36	135	85	—N/a	—	—	—

==== Team podiums ====
- 1 podium – (1 RL)

No.	Season	Date	Location	Race	Level	Place	Teammates
1	2003–04	23 November 2003	Beitostølen, Norway	4 × 10 km Relay C/F	World Cup	3rd	Estil / Bjonviken / Bjørndalen
