= Olga Nazarova (biathlete) =

Belarusian biathlete (born 1977)

Personal information
- Born: August 27, 1977 Omsk, Russian SFSR, Soviet Union

Sport
- Sport: Skiing
Medal record
Women's biathlon
Representing Belarus
World Championships
Bronze medal – third place	2002 Oslo	12.5 km mass start
Bronze medal – third place	2005 Hochfilzen	4 × 6 km Relay
Representing Russia
Junior World Championships
Gold medal – first place	1997 Forni Avoltri	7.5 km team
Bronze medal – third place	1997 Forni Avoltri	7.5 km sprint
Bronze medal – third place	1997 Forni Avoltri	3 × 7.5 km relay
- Updated on March 2, 2013

Olga Viktorovna Nazarova (born August 27, 1977) is a Belarusian biathlete.

Nazarova competed in the 2002, 2006 and 2010 Winter Olympics for Belarus. Her best finish was 4th, as part of the 2006 Belarusian women's relay team. Her best individual placing was 6th, in the individual and the mass start. In 2002, she also finished 14th in the sprint, 11th in the pursuit and 7th with the relay team. In 2006, she also finished 8th in the sprint, and 7th in the pursuit and individual. In 2010, she finished 74th in the sprint.

As of February 2013, Nazarova has won one medal at the Biathlon World Championships, a bronze with the Belarusian women's relay team, in 2005. Her best individual result at the Biathlon World Championships is 9th, in the 2009 sprint.

As of February 2013, Nazarova has won eight Biathlon World Cup medals. This includes two individual medals, both bronze in mass start events at Holmenkollen in 2002–03 and 2005–06. She also has two gold medals, won in the women's relay with Belarus at Brezno in 2002–03 and Hochfilzen in 2003–04. Her best overall finish in the Biathlon World Cup is 13th, in 2008–09.

== World Cup podiums ==
Season	Location	Event	Rank
2001–02	Holmenkollen	Mass Start	3rd place, bronze medalist(s)
2002–03	Brezno	Relay	1st place, gold medalist(s)
2002–03	Rasen-Antholz	Relay	3rd place, bronze medalist(s)
2002–03	Holmenkollen	Relay	2nd place, silver medalist(s)
2003–04	Hochfilzen	Relay	1st place, gold medalist(s)
2004–05	Turin	Relay	3rd place, bronze medalist(s)
2005–06	Oberhof	Relay	3rd place, bronze medalist(s)
2005–06	Holmenkollen	Mass Start	3rd place, bronze medalist(s)
