= Sandrine Bailly =

French biathlete (born 1979)

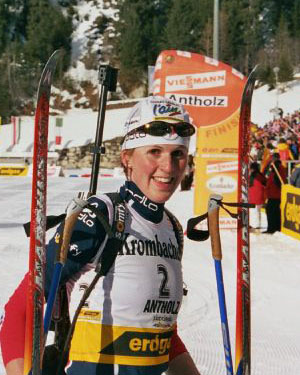

Personal information
- Full name: Sandrine Bailly
- Born: 25 November 1979 (age 46) Belley, France
- Height: 1.73 m (5 ft 8 in)

Sport
- Sport: Skiing

World Cup career
- Seasons: 2000/01 - 2009/10
- Indiv. podiums: 42
- Indiv. wins: 20
Medal record
Women's biathlon
Representing France
Event	1st	2nd	3rd
Olympic Games (2 medals)	0	1	1
World Championships (8 medals)	1	2	5
Total (10 medals)	1	3	6
Olympic Games
Silver medal – second place	2010 Vancouver	4 × 6 km relay
Bronze medal – third place	2006 Turin	4 × 6 km relay
World Championships
Gold medal – first place	2003 Khanty-Mansiysk	10 km pursuit
Silver medal – second place	2007 Antholz-Anterselva	4 × 6 km relay
Silver medal – second place	2007 Antholz-Anterselva	Mixed relay
Bronze medal – third place	2003 Khanty-Mansiysk	12.5 km mass start
Bronze medal – third place	2004 Oberhof	12.5 km mass start
Bronze medal – third place	2006 Pokljuka	Mixed relay
Bronze medal – third place	2008 Östersund	4 × 6 km relay
Bronze medal – third place	2009 Pyeongchang	4 × 6 km relay
- Updated on March 16, 2014

Sandrine Bailly (born 25 November 1979 in Belley, Ain) is a former French biathlete. She was most successful in the 2004–05 season, when she won the overall World Cup, and in the 2007–08 season, when she finished second. In 2003, she became world champion in the 10 km pursuit (together with Martina Glagow).

== Career ==
Bailly has achieved 20 victories in the Biathlon World Cup, as well as numerous wins on the youth and junior levels. In the 2004–05 season she was the most successful female athlete in the overall World Cup (most points in all events) after placing third in the previous year. She also won the World Cup ranking in the 10 km pursuit discipline. In the 2007–08 season, she finished second in the overall standings and, again, first in the pursuit discipline.

Bailly has won seven medals at the Biathlon World Championships (three in individual events and four in relays). She is well-remembered for winning the pursuit gold medal during the 2003 World Championships in Khanty-Mansiysk, sharing it with German biathlete Martina Glagow.

For several years Bailly has also closed out most relays for the French national team. Her greatest success in that discipline was the silver medal in the 4×6 km relay at the 2010 Winter Olympics in Vancouver, British Columbia, Canada.

Bailly retired after the 2009–10 season.

== Achievements ==
=== Olympic Games ===
2 medals (1 silver, 1 bronze)

Event	Individual	Sprint	Pursuit	Mass Start	Relay
(United States) 2002 Salt Lake City	–	7th	17th	—N/a	9th
(Italy) 2006 Turin	6th	6th	12th	10th	Bronze
(Canada) 2010 Vancouver	52nd	15th	27th	7th	Silver

*Pursuit was added as an event in 2002, with mass start being added in 2006.

=== World Championships ===
8 medals (1 gold, 2 silver, 5 bronze)

Event	Individual	Sprint	Pursuit	Mass Start	Relay	Mixed Relay
(Slovenia) 2001 Pokljuka	35th	–	–	–	5th	—N/a
(Norway) 2002 Oslo Holmenkollen	—N/a	—N/a	—N/a	6th	—N/a	—N/a
(Russia) 2003 Khanty-Mansiysk	20th	7th	Gold	Bronze	5th	—N/a
(Germany) 2004 Oberhof	4th	5th	12th	Bronze	5th	—N/a
(Austria) 2005 Hochfilzen	4th	4th	9th	9th	4th	6th
(Slovenia) 2006 Pokljuka	—N/a	—N/a	—N/a	—N/a	—N/a	Bronze
(Italy) 2007 Antholz-Anterselva	9th	9th	30th	23rd	Silver	Silver
(Sweden) 2008 Oestersund	26th	5th	5th	12th	Bronze	–
(South Korea) 2009 Pyeongchang	9th	10th	40th	27th	Bronze	–

*During Olympic seasons competitions are only held for those events not included in the Olympic program.
**Mixed relay was added as an event in 2005.

=== World Cup ===
Season	Overall		Sprint		Pursuit		Individual		Mass start	
Season	Points	Position	Points	Position	Points	Position	Points	Position	Points	Position
2000–01	194	28th	70	30th	26	36th	59	13th	39	25th
2001–02	334	15th	138	11th	110	20th	22	34th	64	8th
2002–03	570	6th	216	7th	180	5th	57	11th	97	8th
2003–04	788	3rd	328	2nd	293	3rd	40	19th	104	4th
2004–05	847	1st	294	2nd	322	1st	90	4th	110	4th
2005–06	674	4th	242	4th	221	3rd	74	5th	134	6th
2006–07	530	8th	254	5th	131	13th	58	18th	83	13th
2007–08	807	2nd	318	2nd	300	1st	46	13th	109	9th
2008–09	356	23rd	143	22nd	50	39th	80	17th	83	20th
2009–10	492	16th	229	13th	105	21st	15	58th	143	6th

=== Individual victories ===
20 victories (1 In, 9 Sp, 9 Pu, 1 MS)

Season	Date	Event	Competition	Level
2000/01; 1 victory (1 In)	14 December 2000	(Slovakia) Brezno	15 km Individual	Biathlon World Cup
2002/03; 2 victories (1 Sp, 1 Pu)	15 February 2003	(Norway) Oslo Holmenkollen	7.5 km Sprint	Biathlon World Cup
2002/03; 2 victories (1 Sp, 1 Pu)	16 March 2003	(Russia) Khanty-Mansiysk	10 km Pursuit	Biathlon World Championships
2003/04; 4 victories (2 Sp, 2 Pu)	4 December 2003	(Finland) Kontiolahti	7.5 km Sprint	Biathlon World Cup
2003/04; 4 victories (2 Sp, 2 Pu)	14 December 2003	(Austria) Hochfilzen	10 km Pursuit	Biathlon World Cup
2003/04; 4 victories (2 Sp, 2 Pu)	20 December 2003	(Slovakia) Brezno	7.5 km Sprint	Biathlon World Cup
2003/04; 4 victories (2 Sp, 2 Pu)	21 December 2003	(Slovakia) Brezno	10 km Pursuit	Biathlon World Cup
2004/05; 6 victories (2 Sp, 3 Pu, 1 MS)	12 December 2004	(Norway) Oslo Holmenkollen	10 km Pursuit	Biathlon World Cup
2004/05; 6 victories (2 Sp, 3 Pu, 1 MS)	16 December 2004	(Sweden) Östersund	7.5 km Sprint	Biathlon World Cup
2004/05; 6 victories (2 Sp, 3 Pu, 1 MS)	23 January 2005	(Italy) Antholz	10 km Pursuit	Biathlon World Cup
2004/05; 6 victories (2 Sp, 3 Pu, 1 MS)	17 February 2005	(Slovenia) Pokljuka	7.5 km Sprint	Biathlon World Cup
2004/05; 6 victories (2 Sp, 3 Pu, 1 MS)	19 February 2005	(Slovenia) Pokljuka	10 km Pursuit	Biathlon World Cup
2004/05; 6 victories (2 Sp, 3 Pu, 1 MS)	20 February 2005	(Slovenia) Pokljuka	12.5 km Mass Start	Biathlon World Cup
2005/06; 2 victories (1 Sp, 1 Pu)	13 January 2006	(Germany) Ruhpolding	7.5 km Sprint	Biathlon World Cup
2005/06; 2 victories (1 Sp, 1 Pu)	11 March 2006	(Slovenia) Pokljuka	10 km Pursuit	Biathlon World Cup
2006/07; 1 victory (1 Sp)	12 January 2007	(Germany) Ruhpolding	7.5 km Sprint	Biathlon World Cup
2007/08; 4 victories (2 Sp, 2 Pu)	7 December 2007	(Austria) Hochfilzen	7.5 km Sprint	Biathlon World Cup
2007/08; 4 victories (2 Sp, 2 Pu)	8 December 2007	(Austria) Hochfilzen	10 km Pursuit	Biathlon World Cup
2007/08; 4 victories (2 Sp, 2 Pu)	15 December 2007	(Slovenia) Pokljuka	7.5 km Sprint	Biathlon World Cup
2007/08; 4 victories (2 Sp, 2 Pu)	1 March 2008	(South Korea) Pyeongchang	10 km Pursuit	Biathlon World Cup

*Results are from IBU races which include the Biathlon World Cup, Biathlon World Championships and the Winter Olympic Games.
