= Olena Petrova =

Ukrainian biathlete (born 1972)

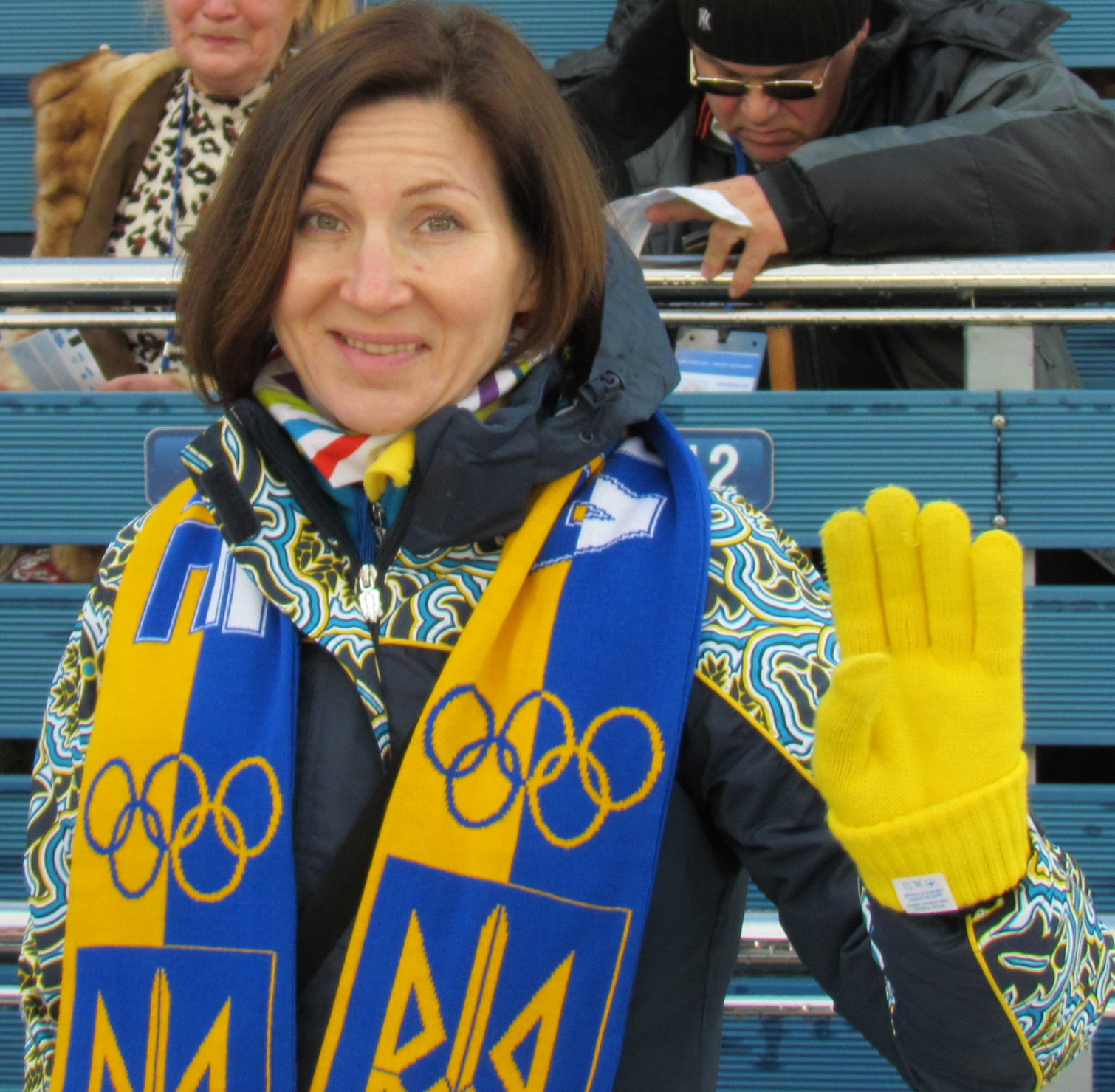

Medal record

Women's biathlon

Representing Ukraine

Olympic Games
Silver medal – second place	1998 Nagano	15 km individual

World Championships
Silver medal – second place	1996 Ruhpolding	Team event
Silver medal – second place	1999 Kontolahti	12.5 km mass start
Silver medal – second place	2003 Khanty-Mansiysk	7.5 km sprint
Silver medal – second place	2003 Khanty-Mansiysk	4 × 6 km relay
Bronze medal – third place	1996 Ruhpolding	15 km individual
Bronze medal – third place	1996 Rupholding	4 x 7.5 km relay
Bronze medal – third place	1997 Brezno-Osrblie	Team event
Bronze medal – third place	2000 Oslo	4 × 7.5 km relay
Bronze medal – third place	2001 Pokljuka	4 × 7.5 km relay
Bronze medal – third place	2004 Oberhof	15 km individual

European Championships
Gold medal – first place	2004 Minsk	Pursuit
Silver medal – second place	2003 Forni Avoltri	15 km individual
Silver medal – second place	2004 Minsk	Sprint
Bronze medal – third place	1994 Kontiolahti	Relay
Bronze medal – third place	2007 Bansko	4 x 6 km relay

Olena Petrova (formerly Elena Petrova; born 24 September 1972 in Sharkan, Udmurtia, Russia) is a former Ukrainian biathlete. Petrova had switched to competing for Ukraine when she was unable to land a spot on the Russian team. She is a Merited Master of Sports of Ukraine, and a former member of Dynamo (Ukraine).

She débuted on the World Cup circuit in 1992. Petrova ended her career in January 2008; to become a youth coach in Ukraine. She is a member of the National Olympic Committee of Ukraine.

== Career ==
- Olympics
- 1998 - silver medal on the 15 km
- World Championships
- 1996 - Silver medal in the Team event, bronze medal on the 15 km and on the relay
- 1997 - Bronze medal in the Team event
- 1999 - Silver medal on the mass-start
- 2000 - Bronze medal on the relay
- 2001 - Bronze medal on the relay
- 2003 - Silver medal on the sprint, and on the relay
- 2004 - Bronze medal on the 15 km

Olympic Games
Preceded by Andriy Deryzemlya	Flagbearer for Ukraine; Salt Lake 2002	Succeeded by Natalia Yakushenko
