= Pavel Rostovtsev =

Russian biathlete

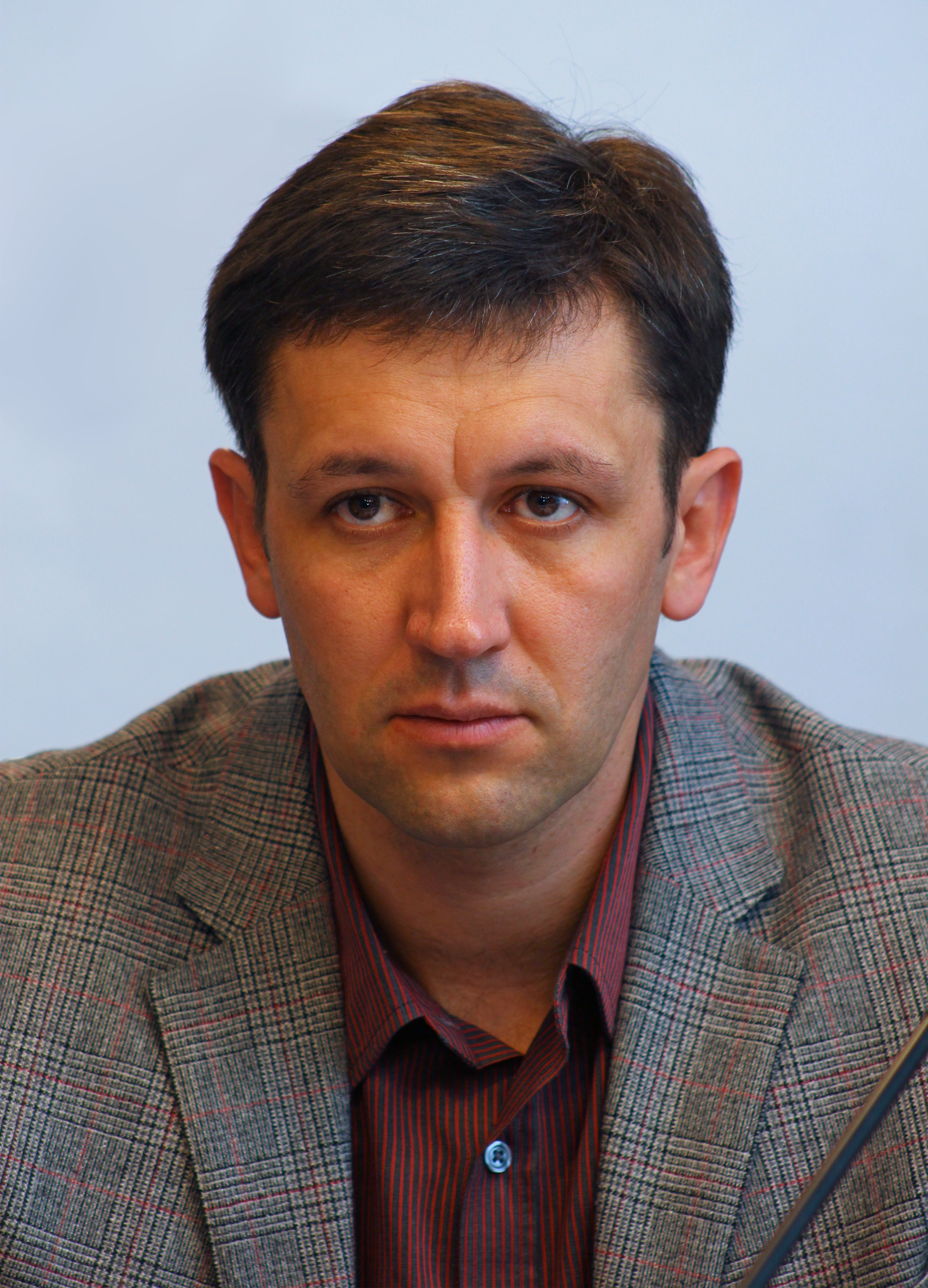
- Rostovtsev in Moscow in 2011.

Personal information
- Full name: Pavel Aleksandrovich Rostovtsev
- Born: 21 September 1971 (age 54) Gus-Khrustalny, RSFSR, Soviet Union
- Height: 1.85 m (6 ft 1 in)

Sport

Professional information
- Sport: Biathlon
- World Cup debut: 18 January 1996
- Retired: 21 November 2006

Olympic Games
- Teams: 2 (2002, 2006)
- Medals: 1 (0 gold)

World Championships
- Teams: 8 (1997, 1999, 2000, 2001, 2002, 2003, 2004, 2005)
- Medals: 9 (3 gold)

World Cup
- Seasons: 11 (1995/96–2005/06)
- Individual victories: 7
- All victories: 13
- Individual podiums: 25
- All podiums: 49
- Discipline titles: 1: 1 Individual (1998–99)
Medal record
Men's biathlon
Representing Russia
Olympic Games
Silver medal – second place	2006 Turin	4 × 7.5 km relay
World Championships
Gold medal – first place	2000 Lahti	4 × 7.5 km relay
Gold medal – first place	2001 Pokljuka	10 km sprint
Gold medal – first place	2001 Pokljuka	12.5 km pursuit
Silver medal – second place	1999 Kontiolahti	4 × 7.5 km relay
Silver medal – second place	2000 Oslo	10 km sprint
Silver medal – second place	2000 Oslo	12.5 km pursuit
Silver medal – second place	2000 Oslo	15 km mass start
Silver medal – second place	2003 Khanty-Mansiysk	4 × 7.5 km relay
Silver medal – second place	2005 Hochfilzen	4 × 7.5 km relay

Pavel Aleksandrovich Rostovtsev (Russian: Павел Александрович Ростовцев; born 21 September 1971) is a Russian former biathlete.

== Life and career ==
Rostovtsev lives in Krasnoyarsk. He is a three times world champion in biathlon. He has competed in the World Cup since the 1995–96 season. In 2000 he became World Champion with the Russian relay team in the World Championships in Lahti. The following year he won both the sprint and the pursuit in the World Championships in Pokljuka. In the 2001–02 season he came second in the overall World Cup standings. He hasn't won a single World Cup competition since the 2001–02 season. In the 2006 Olympics in Turin he was a part of the silver medal winning Russian relay team.

In November 2006, Rostovtsev announced his retirement due to disagreements with the Russian Biathon Union.

== Biathlon results ==
All results are sourced from the International Biathlon Union.

=== Olympic Games ===
1 medal (1 silver)

Event	Individual	Sprint	Pursuit	Mass start	Relay
(United States) 2002 Salt Lake City	6th	6th	5th	—N/a	4th
(Italy) 2006 Turin	13th	—	—	—	Silver

*Mass start was added as an event in 2006.

=== World Championships ===
9 medals (3 gold, 6 silver)

Event	Individual	Sprint	Pursuit	Mass start	Team	Relay	Mixed relay
(Slovakia) 1997 Brezno-Osrblie	—	29th	16th	—N/a	—	8th	—N/a
(Finland) 1999 Kontiolahti	7th	51st	35th	—	—N/a	Silver	—N/a
(Norway) 2000 Oslo Holmenkollen	14th	Silver	Silver	Silver	—N/a	Gold	—N/a
(Slovenia) 2001 Pokljuka	8th	Gold	Gold	14th	—N/a	4th	—N/a
(Norway) 2002 Oslo Holmenkollen	—N/a	—N/a	—N/a	21st	—N/a	—N/a	—N/a
(Russia) 2003 Khanty-Mansiysk	14th	63rd	—	23rd	—N/a	Silver	—N/a
(Germany) 2004 Oberhof	16th	—	—	—	—N/a	—	—N/a
(Austria) 2005 Hochfilzen	47th	—	—	—	—N/a	Silver	—

*During Olympic seasons competitions are only held for those events not included in the Olympic program.
**Team was removed as an event in 1998, and mass start was added in 1999 with the mixed relay being added in 2005.

=== Individual victories ===
7 victories (2 In, 2 Sp, 3 Pu)

Season	Date	Location	Discipline	Level
1998–99; 1 victory (1 In)	16 December 1998	(Slovakia) Brezno-Osrblie	20 km individual	Biathlon World Cup
2000–01; 2 victories (1 Sp, 1 Pu)	3 February 2001	(Slovenia) Pokljuka	10 km sprint	Biathlon World Championships
2000–01; 2 victories (1 Sp, 1 Pu)	4 February 2001	(Slovenia) Pokljuka	12.5 km pursuit	Biathlon World Championships
2001–02; 4 victories (1 In, 1 Sp, 2 Pu)	13 December 2001	(Slovenia) Pokljuka	20 km individual	Biathlon World Cup
2001–02; 4 victories (1 In, 1 Sp, 2 Pu)	9 January 2002	(Germany) Oberhof	10 km sprint	Biathlon World Cup
2001–02; 4 victories (1 In, 1 Sp, 2 Pu)	11 January 2002	(Germany) Oberhof	12.5 km pursuit	Biathlon World Cup
2001–02; 4 victories (1 In, 1 Sp, 2 Pu)	10 March 2002	(Sweden) Östersund	12.5 km pursuit	Biathlon World Cup

*Results are from UIPMB and IBU races which include the Biathlon World Cup, Biathlon World Championships and the Winter Olympic Games.
