= Albina Akhatova =

Russian biathlete (born 1976)

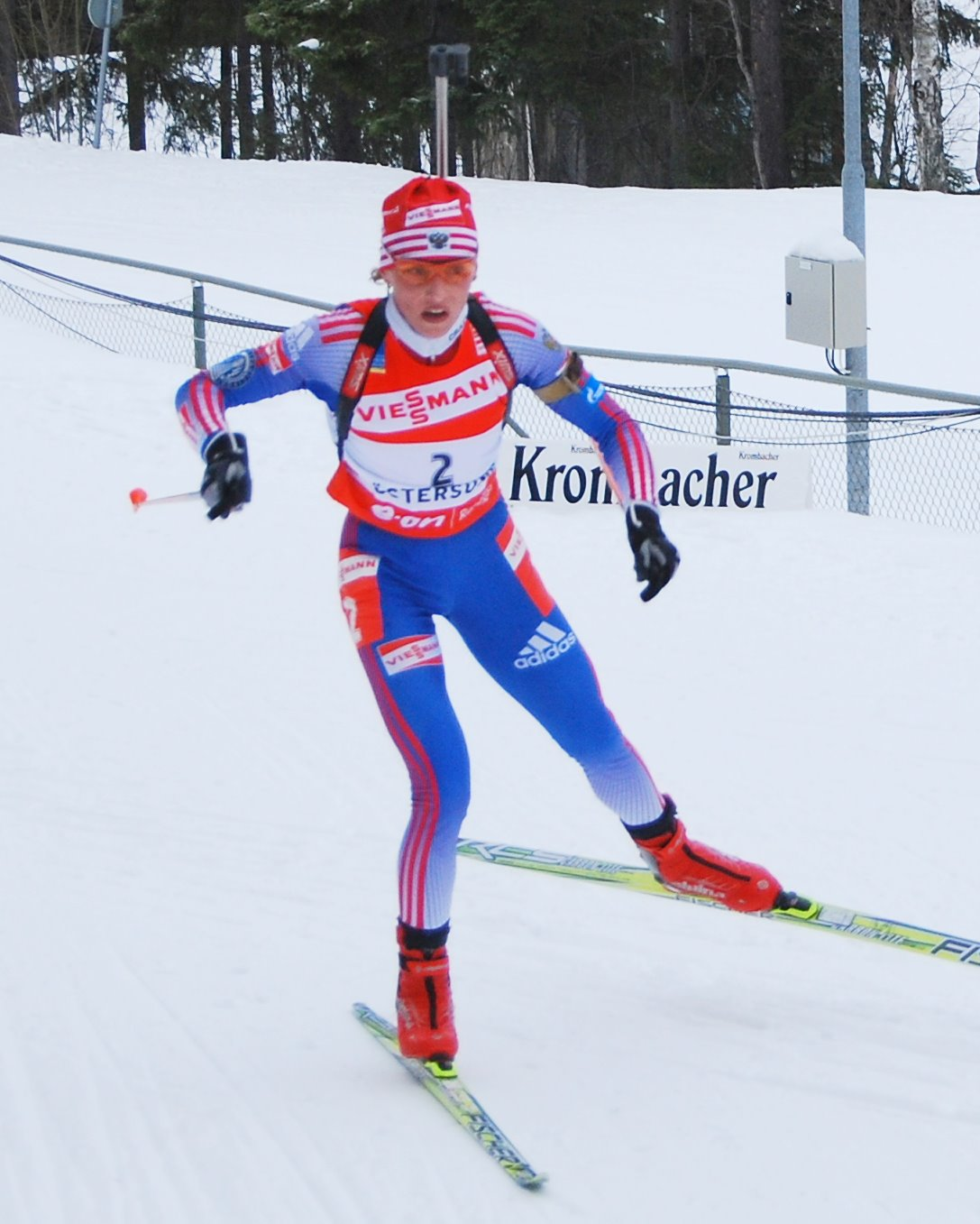
- Akhatova at the Östersund '08 World Championship

Personal information
- Full name: Albina Khamitovna Akhatova
- Born: 13 November 1976 (age 49) Nikolsk, Vologda Oblast, Russian SFSR, Soviet Union
Medal record
Women's biathlon
Representing Russia
Olympic Games
Gold medal – first place	2006 Turin	4 × 6 km relay
Silver medal – second place	1998 Nagano	4 × 7.5 km relay
Bronze medal – third place	2002 Salt Lake City	4 × 7.5 km relay
Bronze medal – third place	2006 Turin	15 km individual
Bronze medal – third place	2006 Turin	10 km pursuit
World Championships
Gold medal – first place	1998 Hochfilzen	Team event
Gold medal – first place	2000 Oslo	4 × 7.5 km relay
Gold medal – first place	2003 Khanty-Mansiysk	12.5 km mass start
Gold medal – first place	2003 Khanty-Mansiysk	4 × 6 km relay
Silver medal – second place	1999 Kontiolahti	4 × 7.5 km relay
Silver medal – second place	2004 Oberhof	15 km individual
Silver medal – second place	2004 Oberhof	4 × 6 km relay
Silver medal – second place	2008 Östersund	7.5 km sprint
Bronze medal – third place	1999 Oslo	15 km individual
Bronze medal – third place	2008 Östersund	10 km pursuit

Albina Khamitovna Akhatova (Russian: Альби́на Хами́товна Аха́това, Tatar: Альбина Хәмит кызы Әхәтова; born 13 November 1976) is a Russian former biathlete. She was banned for two years for doping.

== Career ==
At the 2006 Winter Olympics in Turin, she won bronze medals in the 10 kilometres (6.2 mi) pursuit and 15 kilometres (9.3 mi) individual; she originally finished fourth in the individual but was promoted when her teammate Olga Pyleva was disqualified after failing a doping test. She also won gold, silver, and bronze medals in Olympic relay competitions in 2006, 1998, and 2002, respectively.

Akhatova also won the gold medals in the mass start at the 2003 World Championship held in Khanty-Mansiysk. In 1999 in Oslo, she won the bronze medal, and in 2004 in Oberhof, Germany, she won the silver medal, both over the distance of 15 km. She also was part of Russia's winning relay teams at the 2000 and 2003 World Championships.

After a break in the 2006/07 season, she returned in January 2008. At the 2008 World Championships in Östersund, she won the silver medal in the 7.5 kilometres (4.7 mi) sprint and the bronze medal in the subsequent 10 km pursuit.

=== Doping case ===
On 13 February 2009 the IBU announced that Akhatova, along with teammates Ekaterina Iourieva and Dmitri Yaroshenko, had tested positive for EPO during the World Cup in Östersund. On 11 August 2009, each was banned for two years.

== See also ==
- List of sportspeople sanctioned for doping offences
