= Kateřina Holubcová =

Czech biathlete

Medal record

Women's biathlon

Representing Czech Republic

World Championships
Gold medal – first place	2003 Khanty-Mansiysk	15 km individual
Bronze medal – third place	2003 Khanty-Mansiysk	7.5 km sprint

Kateřina Holubcová-Jakešová (Czech pronunciation: [ˈkatɛr̝ɪna ˈɦoluptsovaː]) (born 28 June 1976 in Ústí nad Labem) is a former Czech biathlete.

== Career ==
- World Championships
- 2003 - gold medal on the 15 km, bronze on the sprint
