= Alexei Aidarov =

Belarusian biathlete

Personal information
- Full name: Alexei Petrovich Aidarov
- Born: 15 November 1974 (age 51) Sverdlovsk, RSFSR, Soviet Union
- Height: 1.87 m (6 ft 2 in)

Sport

Professional information
- Sport: Biathlon
- Club: Dynamo Minsk
- World Cup debut: 8 December 1994

Olympic Games
- Teams: 2 (1998, 2002)
- Medals: 1 (0 gold)

World Championships
- Teams: 10 (1996, 1997, 1998, 1999, 2000, 2001, 2003, 2004, 2007, 2008)
- Medals: 4 (1 gold)

World Cup
- Seasons: 14 (1994/95–2007/08)
- Individual victories: 2
- All victories: 6
- Individual podiums: 5
- All podiums: 22
Medal record
Men's biathlon
Representing Belarus
Olympic Games
Bronze medal – third place	1998 Nagano	20 km individual
World Championships
Gold medal – first place	1999 Kontiolahti	4 × 7.5 km relay
Silver medal – second place	2001 Pokljuka	4 × 7.5 km relay
Bronze medal – third place	1996 Ruhpolding	4 × 7.5 km relay
Bronze medal – third place	2003 Khanty-Mansiysk	4 × 7.5 km relay

Alexei Petrovich Aidarov (Ukrainian: Олексій Айдаров; Belarusian: Аляксей Айдараў; Russian: Алексей Петрович Айдаров; born 15 November 1974) is a Russian-born former Belarusian (until 2006) and Ukrainian (since 2007) biathlete.

== Biathlon results ==
All results are sourced from the International Biathlon Union.

=== Olympic Games ===
1 medal (1 bronze)

Event	Individual	Sprint	Pursuit	Relay
(Japan) 1998 Nagano	Bronze	37th	—N/a	4th
(United States) 2002 Salt Lake City	17th	37th	48th	8th

*Pursuit was added as an event in 2002.

=== World Championships ===
4 medals (1 gold, 1 silver, 2 bronze)

Event	Individual	Sprint	Pursuit	Mass start	Team	Relay	Mixed relay
(Germany) 1996 Ruhpolding	42nd	24th	—N/a	—N/a	—	Bronze	—N/a
(Slovakia) 1997 Brezno-Osrblie	34th	21st	35th	—N/a	—	4th	—N/a
(Slovenia) 1998 Pokljuka	—N/a	—N/a	17th	—N/a	12th	—N/a	—N/a
(Finland) 1999 Kontiolahti	35th	8th	7th	25th	—N/a	Gold	—N/a
(Norway) 2000 Oslo Holmenkollen	5th	16th	10th	25th	—N/a	4th	—N/a
(Slovenia) 2001 Pokljuka	33rd	28th	30th	26th	—N/a	Silver	—N/a
(Russia) 2003 Khanty-Mansiysk	47th	53rd	37th	—	—N/a	Bronze	—N/a
(Germany) 2004 Oberhof	10th	—	—	18th	—N/a	4th	—N/a
(Italy) 2007 Antholz-Anterselva	44th	29th	31st	—	—N/a	8th	—
(Sweden) 2008 Östersund	—	52nd	53rd	—	—N/a	10th	13th

*During Olympic seasons competitions are only held for those events not included in the Olympic program.
**Team was removed as an event in 1998, and pursuit was added in 1997 with mass start being added in 1999 and the mixed relay in 2005.

=== Individual victories ===
2 victories (1 Sp, 1 Pu)

Season	Date	Location	Discipline	Level
1997–98; 1 victory (1 Pu)	7 December 1997	(Norway) Lillehammer	12.5 km pursuit	Biathlon World Cup
1998–99; 1 victory (1 Sp)	16 January 1999	(Germany) Ruhpolding	10 km sprint	Biathlon World Cup

*Results are from UIPMB and IBU races which include the Biathlon World Cup, Biathlon World Championships and the Winter Olympic Games.
