= Svetlana Ishmouratova =

Russian biathlete (born 1972)

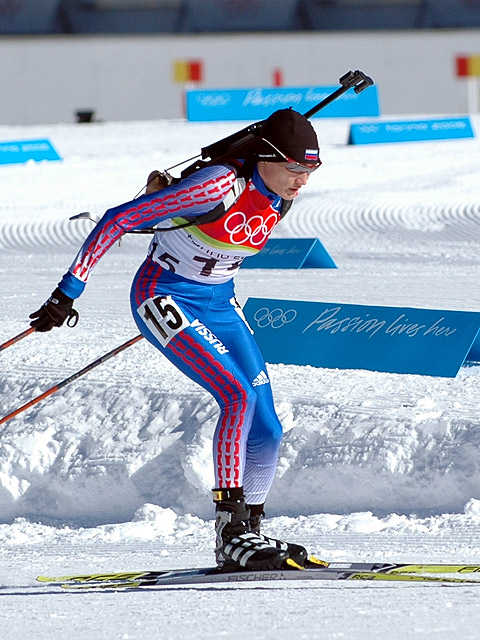
- Svetlana Ishmouratova in Turin 2006

Medal record

Women's biathlon

Representing Russia

Olympic Games
Gold medal – first place	2006 Turin	15 km individual
Gold medal – first place	2006 Turin	4 × 6 km relay
Bronze medal – third place	2002 Salt Lake City	4 × 7.5 km relay

World Championships
Gold medal – first place	1998 Hochfilzen	Team event
Gold medal – first place	2001 Pokljuka	4 × 7.5 km relay
Gold medal – first place	2003 Khanty-Mansiysk	4 × 6 km relay
Gold medal – first place	2005 Hochfilzen	4 × 6 km relay
Gold medal – first place	2005 Khanty-Mansiysk	Mixed relay
Silver medal – second place	2003 Khanty-Mansiysk	12.5 km mass start
Silver medal – second place	2004 Oberhof	4 × 6 km relay
Bronze medal – third place	2003 Khanty-Mansiysk	10 km pursuit

Svetlana Irekovna Ishmouratova (Bashkir: Светлана Ирек ҡыҙы Ишморатова, Russian: Светлана Ирековна Ишмуратова; born 20 April 1972) is a Russian biathlete. She lives in Chelyabinsk and is a soldier by profession.

Ishmouratova won the gold in the women's 15 km individual contest at the 2006 Winter Olympics.

== Biography ==
Svetlana Irekovna Ishmouratova was born on 20 April 1972 in Zlatoust. She is of Tatar-Bashkir origin. Svetlana graduated from the Trade Secondary School of Zlatoust and then the State Academy of Physical Education. In 1991, Ishmouratova became the USSR junior champion in individual race and the champion in senior team race. In 1996, she started once in the FIS Cross-Country World Cup but was accused of doping and disqualified for two years. That was the end of her skiing career.

She began participating in biathlons at the age of 24 in 1996. Her coach was Alexander Brylov. In the 1995/96 season, she debuted in the Biathlon World Cup and took 27th place in the sprint race.

At the 2002 Winter Olympics in Salt Lake City, she became a bronze medalist in the relay. Four years later, she won two gold medals at the 2006 Winter Olympics in the individual race and relay. Besides that, she has six World Champion titles (in summer and winter biathlon).

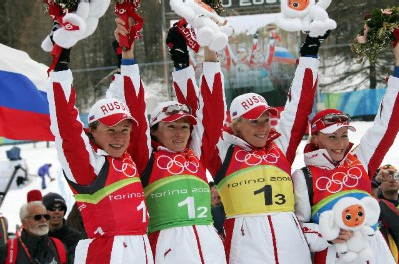
Svetlana Ishmouratova (2nd from left) - Olympic champion in the relay, 23 February 2006, Turin

Ishmouratova is a five-time world champion - in the relay (2001, 2003 and 2005), mixed relay (2005), and team race (1998). Winner of two silver medals (mass start, 2003, relay, 2004) and one bronze (pursuit, 2003). Two-time world champion in summer biathlon (1999). Her best result in the World Cup was 6th place in 2000 and 2006.

On 2 December 2007, Ishmouratova was elected to the 6th State Duma as a member of the United Russia party.

Ishmouratova has the military rank of Colonel of the Russian Armed Forces. By the decision of the Minister of Defense of the Russian Federation, Sergei Shoigu, in February 2016, she was appointed deputy head of CSKA Moscow (FAI RF CSKA) for work with personnel.

== Record ==
=== Olympic Games ===
Event	Individual	Sprint	Pursuit	Mass start	Relay
(United States) 2002 Salt Lake City	8th	9th	15th	—N/a	Bronze
(Italy) 2006 Turin	Gold	10th	4th	12th	Gold

*Mass start was first added in 2006.

=== World Championships ===
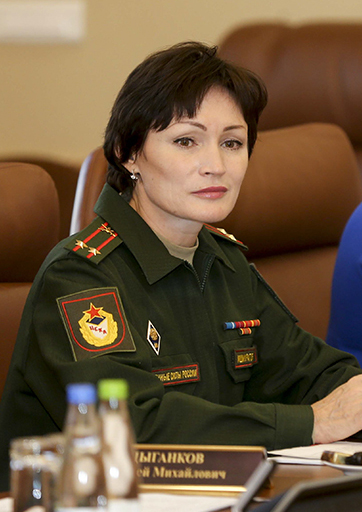
Svetlana Ishmouratova in 2016

Event	Individual	Sprint	Pursuit	Mass start	Team	Relay	Mixed relay
(Germany) 1996 Rupholding	—	27th	—N/a	—N/a	—	—	—N/a
(Austria) 1998 Hochfilzen	—	—	—N/a	—	Gold	—	—N/a
(Finland) 1999 Kontiolahti	—	24th	28th	—	—N/a	—	—N/a
(Norway) 2000 Oslo Holmenkollen	54th	4th	25th	9th	—N/a	—	—N/a
(Slovenia) 2001 Pokljuka	—	15th	16th	12th	—N/a	Gold	—N/a
(Russia) 2003 Khanty-Mansiysk	—	4th	Bronze	Silver	—N/a	Gold	—N/a
(Germany) 2004 Oberhof	—	9th	5th	DNF	—N/a	Silver	—N/a
(Austria) 2005 Hochfilzen	10th	—	—	11th	—N/a	Gold	—N/a
(Russia) 2005 Khanty-Mansiysk	—	—	—	—	—N/a	—	Gold

*Team was removed as an event in 1998, and pursuit was added in 1997 with mass start being added in 1999 and the mixed relay in 2005.

== See also ==
- Russia at the 2006 Winter Olympics
