= Iryna Merkushyna =

Ukrainian biathlete (born 1968)

Olympic medal record

Women's biathlon

Representing Ukraine

World Championships
Silver medal – second place	2003 Khanty-Mansiysk	4 × 6 km relay

European Championships
Bronze medal – third place	2001 Maurienne	4 × 6 km relay
Bronze medal – third place	2002 Kontiolahti	4 × 6 km relay

Iryna Merkushyna-Korchagina (born 3 August 1968 in Samara, Russia) is a biathlete who competed for Ukraine at the 1998 Winter Olympics, finishing 49th in the Women's sprint.

Her daughters Anastasiya and Oleksandra are also biathletes.
