= Biathlon World Championships 2003 =

Sports competition in Khanty-Mansiysk, Russia

- Host city: Khanty-Mansiysk
- Country: Russia
- Events: 8
- Opening: 15 March 2003
- Closing: 23 March 2003

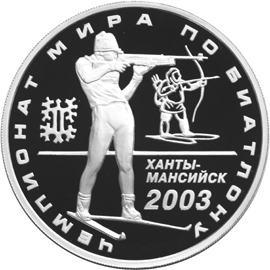

The 38th Biathlon World Championships were held in 2003 in Khanty-Mansiysk, Russia.

== Men's results ==
=== 20 km individual ===
Medal	Name	Nation	Penalties	Result
1st place, gold medalist(s)	Halvard Hanevold	NOR		
2nd place, silver medalist(s)	Vesa Hietalahti	FIN		
3rd place, bronze medalist(s)	Ricco Groß	GER		

=== 10 km sprint ===
Medal	Name	Nation	Penalties	Result
1st place, gold medalist(s)	Ole Einar Bjørndalen	NOR		
2nd place, silver medalist(s)	Ricco Groß	GER		
3rd place, bronze medalist(s)	Zdeněk Vítek	CZE		

=== 12.5 km pursuit ===
Medal	Name	Nation	Penalties	Result
1st place, gold medalist(s)	Ricco Groß	GER		
2nd place, silver medalist(s)	Halvard Hanevold	NOR		
3rd place, bronze medalist(s)	Paavo Puurunen	FIN		

=== 15 km mass start ===
Medal	Name	Nation	Penalties	Result
1st place, gold medalist(s)	Ole Einar Bjørndalen	NOR		
2nd place, silver medalist(s)	Sven Fischer	GER		
3rd place, bronze medalist(s)	Raphaël Poirée	FRA		

=== 4 × 7.5 km relay ===
Medal	Name	Nation	Penalties	Result
1st place, gold medalist(s)	Germany Peter Sendel; Sven Fischer; Ricco Groß; Frank Luck	GER		
2nd place, silver medalist(s)	Russia Viktor Maigourov; Pavel Rostovtsev; Sergei Rozhkov; Sergei Tchepikov	RUS		
3rd place, bronze medalist(s)	Belarus Alexei Aidarov; Vladimir Drachev; Rustam Valiullin; Oleg Ryzhenkov	BLR		

== Women's results ==
=== 15 km individual ===
Medal	Name	Nation	Penalties	Result
1st place, gold medalist(s)	Kateřina Holubcová	CZE		
2nd place, silver medalist(s)	Olena Zubrilova	BLR		
3rd place, bronze medalist(s)	Gunn Margit Andreassen	NOR		

=== 7.5 km sprint ===
Medal	Name	Nation	Penalties	Result
1st place, gold medalist(s)	Sylvie Becaert	FRA		
2nd place, silver medalist(s)	Olena Petrova	UKR		
3rd place, bronze medalist(s)	Kateřina Holubcová	CZE		

=== 10 km pursuit ===
Medal	Name	Nation	Penalties	Result
1st place, gold medalist(s)	Sandrine Bailly	FRA		
1st place, gold medalist(s)	Martina Glagow	GER		
3rd place, bronze medalist(s)	Svetlana Ishmuratova	RUS		

The photo finish could not separate the top duo.

=== 12.5 km mass start ===
Medal	Name	Nation	Penalties	Result
1st place, gold medalist(s)	Albina Akhatova	RUS		
2nd place, silver medalist(s)	Svetlana Ishmuratova	RUS		
3rd place, bronze medalist(s)	Sandrine Bailly	FRA		

=== 4 × 6 km relay ===
Medal	Name	Nation	Penalties	Result
1st place, gold medalist(s)	Russia Albina Akhatova; Svetlana Ishmuratova; Galina Kukleva; Svetlana Tchernousova	RUS		
2nd place, silver medalist(s)	Ukraine Oksana Khvostenko; Iryna Merkushina; Oksana Yakovleva; Olena Petrova	UKR		
3rd place, bronze medalist(s)	Germany Simone Denkinger; Uschi Disl; Kati Wilhelm; Martina Glagow	GER		

== Medal table ==
Place	Nation	1st place, gold medalist(s)	2nd place, silver medalist(s)	3rd place, bronze medalist(s)	Total
1	Germany	3	2	2	7
2	Norway	3	1	1	5
3	Russia	2	2	1	5
4	France	2	0	2	4
5	Czech Republic	1	0	2	3
6	Ukraine	0	2	0	2
7	Belarus	0	1	1	2
8	Finland	0	1	1	2
