= Osrblie =

Osrblie Cserpatak
- Municipality
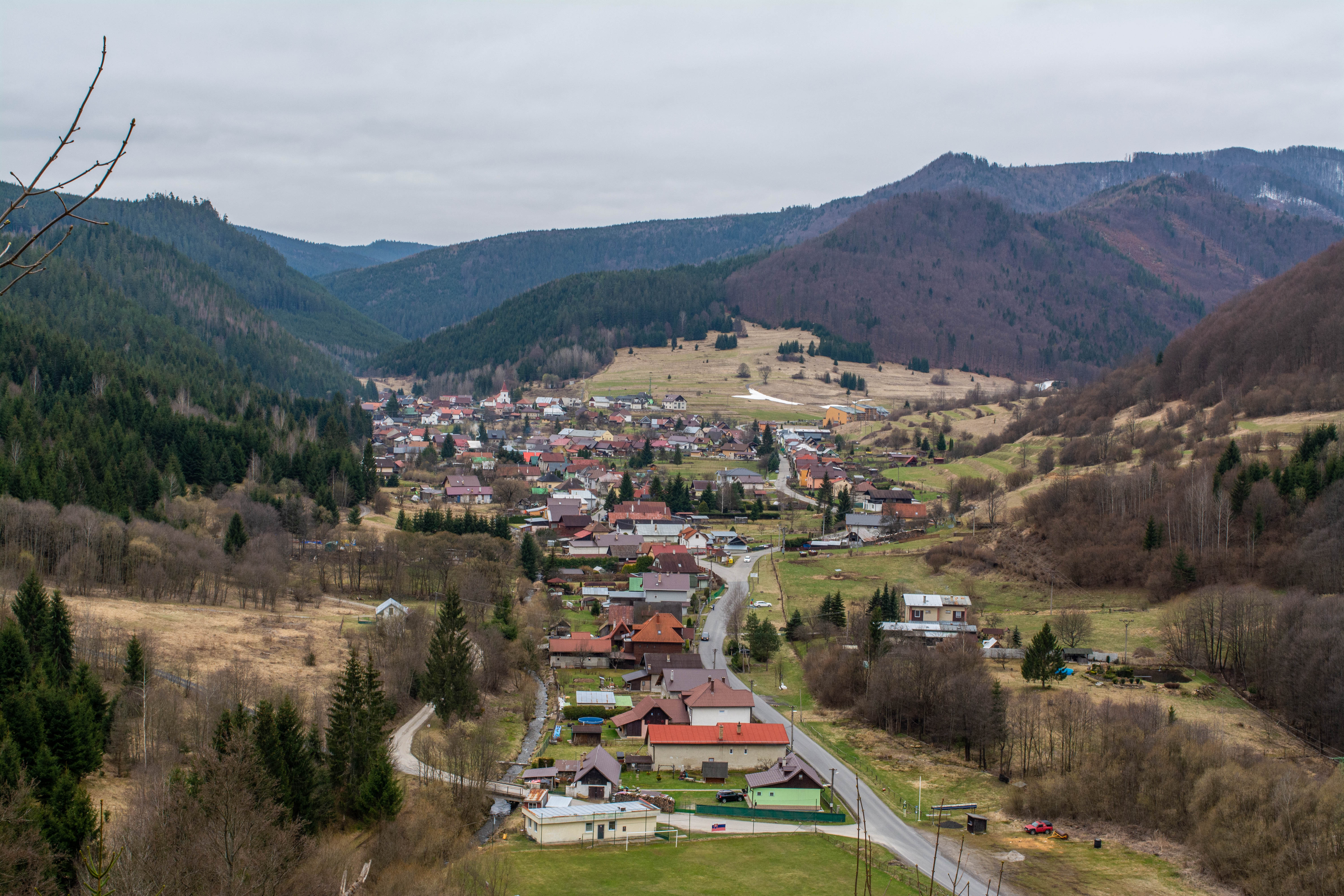

- Flag

- Location of Osrblie in the Banská Bystrica Region Location of Osrblie in Slovakia
- Coordinates: 48.76°N 19.53°E
- Country: Slovakia
- Region: Banská Bystrica Region
- District: Brezno District
- First mentioned: 1622

Area
  - Total: 24.01 km^{2} (9.27 sq mi)
- Elevation: 585 m (1,919 ft)

Population (2025)
  - Total: 335
- Time zone: UTC+1 (CET)
  - Summer (DST): UTC+2 (CEST)
- Postal code: 976 45
- Area code: +421 48
- Vehicle registration plate (until 2022): BR
- Website: www.osrblie.sk

Osrblie (Hungarian: Cserpatak) is a village and municipality in Brezno District, in the Banská Bystrica Region of central Slovakia. The village is best known for biathlon races, with Biathlon World Cup events taking place since the mid-1990s and with one Biathlon World Championships in 1997. It also hosted the biathlon event at the 2015 Winter Universiade.

== History ==
In historical records the village was first mentioned in 1580, although it was established much sooner, around the second half of the 15th century, with the reference to the iron ore mining, which lasted until the 19th century.

== Geography ==
The municipality lies at an altitude of 585 metres (1,919 ft) and covers an area of 24.01 km^{2} (9.27 sq mi) (2025).

== Population ==
Population statistic (10 years)
Year	1995	2005	2015	2025
Count	375	382	380	335
Difference		+1.86%	−0.52%	−11.84%

Population statistic
Year	2024	2025
Count	343	335
Difference		−2.33%

It has a population of 335 people (31 December 2025).

=== Ethnicity ===
Census 2021 (1+ %)
Ethnicity	Number	Fraction
Slovak	349	97.75%
Not found out	6	1.68%
Other	5	1.4%
Total	357	

In year 2021 was 357 people by ethnicity 349 as Slovak, 6 as Not found out, 5 as Other, 2 as Rusyn, 2 as Hungarian and 1 as Czech.

Note on population: The difference values of population numbers in the table "Population statistic" and in the sections "Ethnicity" & "Religion" is caused by the use of various statistical methods.

=== Religion ===
Census 2021 (1+ %)
Religion	Number	Fraction
Roman Catholic Church	247	69.19%
None	85	23.81%
Not found out	9	2.52%
Christian Congregations in Slovakia	5	1.4%
Greek Catholic Church	4	1.12%
Evangelical Church	4	1.12%
Total	357	

In year 2021 was 357 people by religion 247 from Roman Catholic Church, 85 from None, 9 from Not found out, 5 from Christian Congregations in Slovakia, 4 from Greek Catholic Church, 4 from Evangelical Church, 2 from Other and not ascertained christian church and 1 from Ad hoc movements.
