= 1997–98 Biathlon World Cup =

Biathlon competition

1997–98 World Cup
Discipline	Men	Women
Overall	(Norway) Ole Einar Bjørndalen	(Sweden) Magdalena Forsberg
Nations Cup	Norway	Germany
Individual	(Norway) Halvard Hanevold	(Sweden) Magdalena Forsberg
Sprint	(Norway) Ole Einar Bjørndalen	(Sweden) Magdalena Forsberg
Pursuit	(Germany) Sven Fischer	(Sweden) Magdalena Forsberg
Relay	Norway; Germany	Russia

Competition

The 1997–98 Biathlon World Cup was a multi-race tournament over a season of biathlon, organised by the International Biathlon Union. The season started on 6 December 1997 in Lillehammer, Norway, and ended on 15 March 1998 in Hochfilzen, Austria. It was the 21st season of the Biathlon World Cup.

== Calendar ==
Below is the IBU World Cup calendar for the 1997–98 season.

Location	Date	Individual	Sprint	Pursuit	Mass start	Relay
(Norway) Lillehammer	6–7 December		●	●		
(Sweden) Östersund	11–14 December	●	●			●
(Finland) Kontiolahti	18–21 December		●	●		●
(Germany) Ruhpolding	8–11 January		●●			●
(Italy) Antholz	15–18 January	●	●			●
(Japan) Nagano	11–21 February	●	●			●
(Slovenia) Pokljuka	3–8 March	●	●●	●		
(Austria) Hochfilzen	12–15 March	●	●			
Total		5	10	3	0	5

== World Cup Podium ==
=== Men ===
Stage	Date	Place	Discipline	Winner	Second	Third	Yellow bib (After competition)	Det.
1	6 December 1997	(Norway) Lillehammer	10 km Sprint	(Germany) Frank Luck	(Norway) Dag Bjørndalen	(France) Raphaël Poirée	(Germany) Frank Luck	Detail
1	7 December 1997	(Norway) Lillehammer	12.5 km Pursuit	(Belarus) Alexei Aidarov	(Norway) Halvard Hanevold	(Russia) Pavel Mouslimov	(Germany) Frank Luck	Detail
2	11 December 1997	(Sweden) Östersund	20 km Individual	(Norway) Sylfest Glimsdal	(Russia) Alexei Kobelev	(Russia) Viktor Maigourov	(Norway) Dag Bjørndalen	Detail
2	13 December 1997	(Sweden) Östersund	10 km Sprint	(Russia) Alexei Kobelev	(France) Raphaël Poirée	(Germany) Carsten Heymann	(Russia) Pavel Mouslimov	Detail
3	18 December 1997	(Finland) Kontiolahti	10 km Sprint	(Germany) Jan Wüstenfeld	(Germany) Ricco Groß	(Germany) Sven Fischer	(Germany) Frank Luck	Detail
3	20 December 1997	(Finland) Kontiolahti	12.5 km Pursuit	(Germany) Sven Fischer	(Austria) Ludwig Gredler	(Germany) Jan Wüstenfeld	(Germany) Sven Fischer	Detail
4	8 January 1998	(Germany) Ruhpolding	10 km Sprint	(France) Raphaël Poirée	(Norway) Ole Einar Bjørndalen	(Germany) Ricco Groß	(Germany) Ricco Groß	Detail
4	10 January 1998	(Germany) Ruhpolding	10 km Sprint	(Norway) Frode Andresen	(Norway) Ole Einar Bjørndalen	(France) Raphaël Poirée	(France) Raphaël Poirée	Detail
5	15 January 1998	(Italy) Antholz-Anterselva	20 km Individual	(Norway) Halvard Hanevold	(Germany) Ricco Groß	(Belarus) Alexei Aidarov	(Germany) Ricco Groß	Detail
5	17 January 1998	(Italy) Antholz-Anterselva	10 km Sprint	(Norway) Ole Einar Bjørndalen	(Norway) Frode Andresen	(Russia) Viktor Maigourov	(Germany) Ricco Groß	Detail
OG	11 February 1998	(Japan) Nagano	20 km Individual	(Norway) Halvard Hanevold	(Italy) Pieralberto Carrara	(Belarus) Alexei Aidarov	(Germany) Ricco Groß	Detail
OG	18 February 1998	(Japan) Nagano	10 km Sprint	(Norway) Ole Einar Bjørndalen	(Norway) Frode Andresen	(Finland) Ville Räikkönen	(Germany) Ricco Groß	Detail
6	3 March 1998	(Slovenia) Pokljuka	20 km Individual	(Germany) Ricco Groß	(Norway) Egil Gjelland	(Norway) Ole Einar Bjørndalen	(Germany) Ricco Groß	Detail
6	5 March 1998	(Slovenia) Pokljuka	10 km Sprint	(Germany) Frank Luck	(France) Raphaël Poirée	(Russia) Viktor Maigourov	(Norway) Ole Einar Bjørndalen	Detail
7	7 March 1998	(Slovenia) Pokljuka	10 km Sprint	(Russia) Vladimir Drachev	(Germany) Sven Fischer	(Latvia) Ilmārs Bricis	(Norway) Ole Einar Bjørndalen	Detail
WC	8 March 1998	(Slovenia) Pokljuka	12.5 km Pursuit	(Russia) Vladimir Drachev	(Norway) Ole Einar Bjørndalen	(France) Raphaël Poirée	(Norway) Ole Einar Bjørndalen	Detail
8	12 March 1998	(Austria) Hochfilzen	20 km Individual	(Russia) Vladimir Drachev	(Norway) Halvard Hanevold	(Russia) Viktor Maigourov	(Norway) Ole Einar Bjørndalen	Detail
8	14 March 1998	(Austria) Hochfilzen	10 km Sprint	(Russia) Vladimir Drachev	(Latvia) Ilmārs Bricis	(Germany) Sven Fischer	(Norway) Ole Einar Bjørndalen	Detail

=== Women ===
Stage	Date	Place	Discipline	Winner	Second	Third	Yellow bib (After competition)	Det.
1	6 December 1997	(Norway) Lillehammer	7.5 km Sprint	(Russia) Galina Koukleva	(Russia) Olga Melnik	(Sweden) Magdalena Forsberg	(Russia) Galina Koukleva	Detail
1	7 December 1997	(Norway) Lillehammer	10 km Pursuit	(Russia) Galina Koukleva	(Sweden) Magdalena Forsberg	(Germany) Uschi Disl	(Russia) Galina Koukleva	Detail
2	11 December 1997	(Sweden) Östersund	15 km Individual	(Slovenia) Andreja Grašič	(Sweden) Magdalena Forsberg	(Ukraine) Olena Petrova	(Russia) Galina Koukleva	Detail
2	13 December 1997	(Sweden) Östersund	7.5 km Sprint	(Sweden) Magdalena Forsberg	(Ukraine) Olena Zubrilova	(Russia) Galina Koukleva	(Sweden) Magdalena Forsberg	Detail
3	18 December 1997	(Finland) Kontiolahti	7.5 km Sprint	(Germany) Uschi Disl	(Germany) Martina Zellner	(Russia) Svetlana Ishmouratova	(Sweden) Magdalena Forsberg	Detail
3	20 December 1997	(Finland) Kontiolahti	10 km Pursuit	(Sweden) Magdalena Forsberg	(Russia) Svetlana Ishmouratova	(Germany) Martina Zellner	(Sweden) Magdalena Forsberg	Detail
4	8 January 1998	(Germany) Ruhpolding	7.5 km Sprint	(Sweden) Magdalena Forsberg	(Germany) Petra Behle	(France) Corinne Niogret	(Sweden) Magdalena Forsberg	Detail
4	10 January 1998	(Germany) Ruhpolding	7.5 km Sprint	(Germany) Petra Behle	(Germany) Martina Zellner	(France) Corinne Niogret	(Sweden) Magdalena Forsberg	Detail
5	15 January 1998	(Italy) Antholz-Anterselva	15 km Individual	(Russia) Olga Romasko	(Norway) Liv Grete Skjelbreid	(Sweden) Magdalena Forsberg	(Sweden) Magdalena Forsberg	Detail
5	17 January 1998	(Italy) Antholz-Anterselva	7.5 km Sprint	(Ukraine) Nina Lemesh	(Russia) Svetlana Ishmouratova	(Sweden) Magdalena Forsberg	(Sweden) Magdalena Forsberg	Detail
OG	9 February 1998	(Japan) Nagano	15 km Individual	(Bulgaria) Ekaterina Dafovska	(Ukraine) Olena Petrova	(Germany) Uschi Disl	(Sweden) Magdalena Forsberg	Detail
OG	15 February 1998	(Japan) Nagano	7.5 km Sprint	(Russia) Galina Koukleva	(Germany) Uschi Disl	(Germany) Katrin Apel	(Sweden) Magdalena Forsberg	Detail
6	3 March 1998	(Slovenia) Pokljuka	15 km Individual	(Sweden) Magdalena Forsberg	(France) Florence Baverel	(Germany) Uschi Disl	(Sweden) Magdalena Forsberg	Detail
6	5 March 1998	(Slovenia) Pokljuka	7.5 km Sprint	(France) Corinne Niogret	(France) Emmanuelle Claret	(Norway) Annette Sikveland	(Sweden) Magdalena Forsberg	Detail
7	7 March 1998	(Slovenia) Pokljuka	7.5 km Sprint	(Sweden) Magdalena Forsberg	(Norway) Ann-Elen Skjelbreid	(France) Christelle Gros	(Sweden) Magdalena Forsberg	Detail
WC	8 March 1998	(Slovenia) Pokljuka	10 km Pursuit	(Sweden) Magdalena Forsberg	(France) Corinne Niogret	(Germany) Martina Zellner	(Sweden) Magdalena Forsberg	Detail
8	12 March 1998	(Austria) Hochfilzen	15 km Individual	(Germany) Uschi Disl	(Slovenia) Andreja Grašič	(Germany) Martina Zellner	(Sweden) Magdalena Forsberg	Detail
8	14 March 1998	(Austria) Hochfilzen	7.5 km Sprint	(Germany) Uschi Disl	(Sweden) Magdalena Forsberg	(Norway) Liv Grete Skjelbreid	(Sweden) Magdalena Forsberg	Detail

=== Men's team ===
Event	Date	Place	Discipline	Winner	Second	Third
2	14 December 1997	(Sweden) Östersund	4x7.5 km Relay	Norway Egil Gjelland; Sylfest Glimsdal; Halvard Hanevold; Ole Einar Bjørndalen	Germany Jan Wüstenfeld; Carsten Heymann; Marco Morgenstern; Sven Fischer	Italy Patrick Favre; Wilfried Pallhuber; Pieralberto Carrara; Rene Cattarinussi
3	21 December 1997	(Finland) Kontiolahti	4x7.5 km Relay	Russia Sergei Rozhkov; Vladimir Drachev; Sergei Tarasov; Pavel Rostovtsev	Belarus Alexei Aidarov; Oleg Ryzhenkov; Vadim Sashurin; Alexander Popov	Italy Patrick Favre; Wilfried Pallhuber; Pieralberto Carrara; Rene Cattarinussi
4	11 January 1998	(Germany) Ruhpolding	4x7.5 km Relay	Norway Egil Gjelland; Frode Andresen; Dag Bjørndalen; Ole Einar Bjørndalen	Germany Ricco Gross; Jan Wüstenfeld; Sven Fischer; Frank Luck	Russia Sergei Rozhkov; Pavel Vavilov; Pavel Rostovtsev; Alexei Kobelev
5	18 January 1998	(Italy) Antholz-Anterselva	4x7.5 km Relay	Germany Ricco Gross; Peter Sendel; Sven Fischer; Frank Luck	Norway Egil Gjelland; Halvard Hanevold; Frode Andresen; Ole Einar Bjørndalen	Belarus Alexei Aidarov; Oleg Ryzhenkov; Alexander Popov; Vadim Sashurin
OG	21 February 1998	(Japan) Nagano	4x7.5 km Relay	Germany Ricco Gross; Peter Sendel; Sven Fischer; Frank Luck	Norway Egil Gjelland; Halvard Hanevold; Dag Bjørndalen; Ole Einar Bjørndalen	Russia Pavel Mouslimov; Vladimir Drachev; Sergei Tarasov; Viktor Maigourov
WC	15 March 1998	(Austria) Hochfilzen	Team event	Norway Egil Gjelland; Sylfest Glimsdal; Halvard Hanevold; Ole Einar Bjørndalen	Germany Ricco Gross; Carsten Heymann; Sven Fischer; Frank Luck	Russia Vladimir Drachev; Alexei Kobelev; Sergei Rozhkov; Viktor Maigourov

=== Women's team ===
Event	Date	Place	Discipline	Winner	Second	Third
2	14 December 1997	(Sweden) Östersund	4x7.5 km Relay	France Florence Baverel; Emmanuelle Claret; Christelle Gros; Corinne Niogret	Germany Uschi Disl; Martina Zellner; Katrin Apel; Petra Behle	Russia Olga Melnik; Galina Kukleva; Albina Akhatova; Anna Volkova
3	21 December 1997	(Finland) Kontiolahti	4x7.5 km Relay	Czech Republic Kateřina Losmanová; Jiřina Pelcová; Irena Česneková; Eva Háková	France Florence Baverel; Anne Briand; Christelle Gros; Corinne Niogret	Germany Uschi Disl; Simone Greiner; Katrin Apel; Martina Zellner
4	11 January 1998	(Germany) Ruhpolding	4x7.5 km Relay	Russia Olga Melnik; Galina Kukleva; Nadezhda Talanova; Albina Akhatova	Germany Uschi Disl; Martina Zellner; Katrin Apel; Petra Behle	Norway Ann-Elen Skjelbreid; Annette Sikveland; Gunn Margit Andreassen; Liv Grete Skjelbreid
5	18 January 1998	(Italy) Antholz-Anterselva	4x7.5 km Relay	Russia Anna Volkova; Galina Kukleva; Olga Romasko; Albina Akhatova	Norway Ann-Elen Skjelbreid; Annette Sikveland; Gunn Margit Andreassen; Liv Grete Skjelbreid	Germany Uschi Disl; Martina Zellner; Katrin Apel; Katja Beer
OG	19 February 1998	(Japan) Nagano	4x7.5 km Relay	Germany Uschi Disl; Martina Zellner; Katrin Apel; Petra Behle	Russia Olga Melnik; Galina Kukleva; Albina Akhatova; Olga Romasko	Norway Ann-Elen Skjelbreid; Annette Sikveland; Gunn Margit Andreassen; Liv Grete Skjelbreid

== Standings: Men ==
=== Overall ===
Pos.		Points
1.	(Norway) Ole Einar Bjørndalen	289
2.	(Germany) Ricco Groß	286
3.	(Germany) Sven Fischer	270
4.	(Norway) Halvard Hanevold	263
5.	(France) Raphaël Poirée	249

- Final standings after 18 races.

=== Individual ===
Pos.		Points
1.	(Norway) Halvard Hanevold	103
2.	(Germany) Ricco Groß	94
3.	(Norway) Ole Einar Bjørndalen	71
4.	(Italy) Pieralberto Carrara	70
5.	(Russia) Viktor Maigourov	68

- Final standings after 5 races.

=== Sprint ===
Pos.		Points
1.	(Norway) Ole Einar Bjørndalen	185
2.	(France) Raphaël Poirée	161
3.	(Norway) Frode Andresen	147
4.	(Germany) Sven Fischer	147
5.	(Russia) Vladimir Drachev	145

- Final standings after 10 races.

=== Pursuit ===
Pos.		Points
1.	(Germany) Sven Fischer	72
2.	(Germany) Ricco Groß	59
3.	(Russia) Sergei Rozhkov	54
4.	(Russia) Vladimir Drachev	51
5.	(Germany) Frank Luck	51

- Final standings after 3 races.

=== Relay ===
Pos.		Points
1.	Germany	112
1.	Norway	112
3.	Russia	98
4.	Belarus	90
5.	Italy	87

- Final standings after 5 races.

=== Nation ===
Pos.		Points
1.	Norway	5660
2.	Germany	5493
3.	Russia	5481
4.	Italy	4943
5.	Belarus	4522

- Final standings after 20 races.

== Standings: Women ==
=== Overall ===
Pos.		Points
1.	(Sweden) Magdalena Forsberg	387
2.	(Germany) Uschi Disl	325
3.	(Germany) Martina Zellner	255
4.	(France) Corinne Niogret	238
5.	(Russia) Galina Kukleva	227

- Final standings after 18 races.

=== Individual ===
Pos.		Points
1.	(Sweden) Magdalena Forsberg	99
2.	(Germany) Uschi Disl	97
3.	(Slovenia) Andreja Grašič	83
4.	(Germany) Martina Zellner	78
5.	(Ukraine) Olena Petrova	77

- Final standings after 5 races.

=== Sprint ===
Pos.		Points
1.	(Sweden) Magdalena Forsberg	202
2.	(Germany) Uschi Disl	171
3.	(France) Corinne Niogret	152
4.	(Russia) Galina Kukleva	141
5.	(Germany) Martina Zellner	129

- Final standings after 10 races.

=== Pursuit ===
Pos.		Points
1.	(Sweden) Magdalena Forsberg	86
2.	(Germany) Uschi Disl	57
3.	(France) Corinne Niogret	53
4.	(Russia) Galina Kukleva	49
5.	(Germany) Martina Zellner	48

- Final standings after 3 races.

=== Relay ===
Pos.		Points
1.	Russia	110
2.	Germany	106
3.	France	100
4.	Norway	96
5.	Czech Republic	91

- Final standings after 5 races.

=== Nation ===
Pos.		Points
1.	Germany	5560
2.	Russia	5454
3.	France	5151
4.	Norway	5108
5.	Ukraine	4601

- Final standings after 20 races.

== Medal table ==
Rank	Nation	Gold	Silver	Bronze	Total
1	Germany	12	11	14	37
2	Russia	12	5	10	27
3	Norway	8	14	5	27
4	Sweden	6	3	3	12
5	France	3	6	6	15
6	Ukraine	1	2	1	4
7	Belarus	1	1	3	5
8	Slovenia	1	1	0	2
9	Bulgaria	1	0	0	1
9	Czech Republic	1	0	0	1
11	Italy	0	1	2	3
12	Latvia	0	1	1	2
13	Austria	0	1	0	1
14	Finland	0	0	1	1
Totals (14 entries)		46	46	46	138

== Achievements ==
Victory in this World Cup (all-time number of victories in parentheses)

Men

- Vladimir Drachev (RUS), 4 (10) first places
- Frank Luck (GER), 2 (6) first places
- Ole Einar Bjørndalen (NOR), 2 (6) first places
- Halvard Hanevold (NOR), 2 (2) first places
- Sven Fischer (GER), 1 (9) first place
- Sylfest Glimsdal (NOR), 1 (3) first place
- Ricco Groß (GER), 1 (3) first place
- Alexei Kobelev (RUS), 1 (2) first place
- Alexei Aidarov (BLR), 1 (1) first place
- Jan Wüstenfeld (GER), 1 (1) first place
- Raphaël Poirée (FRA), 1 (1) first place
- Frode Andresen (NOR), 1 (1) first place

Women

- Magdalena Forsberg (SWE), 6 (12) first places
- Uschi Disl (GER), 3 (14) first places
- Galina Kukleva (RUS), 3 (4) first places
- Petra Behle (GER), 1 (6) first place
- Olga Romasko (RUS), 1 (4) first place
- Andreja Grašič (SVN), 1 (3) first place
- Corinne Niogret (FRA), 1 (2) first place
- Nina Lemesh (UKR), 1 (1) first place
- Ekaterina Dafovska (BUL), 1 (1) first place

== Retirements ==
Following notable biathletes retired after the 1997–98 season:

- Alexandr Popov (BLR)
- Patrice Bailly-Salins (FRA)
- Hubert Leitgeb (ITA)
- Jon Åge Tyldum (NOR)
- Sergei Tarasov (RUS)
- Mikael Löfgren (SWE)
- Myriam Bédard (CAN)
- Jiřina Pelcová (CZE)
- Petra Behle (GER)
- Hildegunn Mikkelsplass (NOR)
- Olga Melnik (RUS)
- Valentyna Tserbe-Nessina (UKR)
