= 1995–96 Biathlon World Cup =

Biathlon competition

1995–96 World Cup
Discipline	Men	Women
Overall	(Russia) Vladimir Drachev	(France) Emmanuelle Claret
Nations Cup	Russia	France
Individual	(Russia) Vladimir Drachev	(Slovenia) Andreja Grašič
Sprint	(Russia) Vladimir Drachev	(France) Emmanuelle Claret

Competition

The 1995–96 Biathlon World Cup was a multi-race tournament over a season of biathlon, organised by the International Biathlon Union. The season started on 7 December 1995 in Östersund, Sweden, and ended on 17 March 1996 in Hochfilzen, Austria. It was the 19th season of the Biathlon World Cup.

== Calendar ==
Below is the IBU World Cup calendar for the 1995–96 season.

Location	Date	Individual	Sprint	Pursuit	Mass start	Relay
(Sweden) Östersund	7–10 December	●	●			●
(Norway) Holmenkollen	14–17 December	●	●			●
(Italy) Antholz	11–14 January	●	●			●
(Slovakia) Osrblie	18–21 January	●	●			
(Germany) Ruhpolding	3–11 February	●	●			●
(Slovenia) Pokljuka	7–10 March	●	●			●
(Austria) Hochfilzen	14–17 March	●	●			●
Total		7	7	0	0	6

== World Cup Podium ==
=== Men ===
Stage	Date	Place	Discipline	Winner	Second	Third	Yellow bib (After competition)	Det.
1	7 December 1995	(Sweden) Östersund	20 km Individual	(Finland) Vesa Hietalahti	(Russia) Sergei Tarasov	(Russia) Pavel Mouslimov	(Finland) Vesa Hietalahti	Detail
1	9 December 1995	(Sweden) Östersund	10 km Sprint	(Austria) Ludwig Gredler	(Germany) Sven Fischer	(Italy) Pieralberto Carrara	(Germany) Sven Fischer	Detail
2	14 December 1995	(Norway) Oslo Holmenkollen	20 km Individual	(Germany) Sven Fischer	(Sweden) Mikael Löfgren	(Russia) Vladimir Drachev	(Germany) Sven Fischer	Detail
2	16 December 1995	(Norway) Oslo Holmenkollen	10 km Sprint	(Germany) Sven Fischer	(Russia) Viktor Maigourov	(Germany) Ricco Groß	(Germany) Sven Fischer	Detail
3	11 January 1996	(Italy) Antholz-Anterselva	20 km Individual	(Norway) Ole Einar Bjørndalen	(Russia) Vladimir Drachev	(Norway) Halvard Hanevold	(Germany) Sven Fischer	Detail
3	13 January 1996	(Italy) Antholz-Anterselva	10 km Sprint	(Austria) Ludwig Gredler	(Norway) Ole Einar Bjørndalen	(Russia) Vladimir Drachev	(Germany) Sven Fischer	Detail
4	18 January 1996	(Slovakia) Brezno-Osrblie	20 km Individual	(Russia) Vladimir Drachev	(France) Raphaël Poirée	(Finland) Vesa Hietalahti	(Russia) Vladimir Drachev	Detail
4	20 January 1996	(Slovakia) Brezno-Osrblie	10 km Sprint	(Russia) Vladimir Drachev	(Austria) Ludwig Gredler	(Italy) René Cattarinussi	(Russia) Vladimir Drachev	Detail
WC	4 February 1996	(Germany) Ruhpolding	20 km Individual	(Russia) Sergei Tarasov	(Russia) Vladimir Drachev	(Belarus) Vadim Sashurin	(Russia) Vladimir Drachev	Detail
WC	9 February 1996	(Germany) Ruhpolding	10 km Sprint	(Russia) Vladimir Drachev	(Russia) Viktor Maigourov	(Italy) René Cattarinussi	(Russia) Vladimir Drachev	Detail
5	7 March 1996	(Slovenia) Pokljuka	20 km Individual	(Russia) Sergei Rozhkov	(Russia) Vladimir Drachev	(Russia) Viktor Maigourov	(Russia) Vladimir Drachev	Detail
5	9 March 1996	(Slovenia) Pokljuka	10 km Sprint	(Russia) Vladimir Drachev	(Russia) Viktor Maigourov	(Germany) Sven Fischer	(Russia) Vladimir Drachev	Detail
6	14 March 1996	(Austria) Hochfilzen	20 km Individual	(Russia) Viktor Maigourov	(Norway) Halvard Hanevold	(Russia) Vladimir Drachev	(Russia) Vladimir Drachev	Detail
6	16 March 1996	(Austria) Hochfilzen	10 km Sprint	(Russia) Vladimir Drachev	(France) Raphaël Poirée	(Germany) Sven Fischer	(Russia) Vladimir Drachev	Detail

=== Women ===
Stage	Date	Place	Discipline	Winner	Second	Third	Yellow bib (After competition)	Det.
1	7 December 1995	(Sweden) Östersund	15 km Individual	(Germany) Uschi Disl	(Ukraine) Tetyana Vodopyanova	(Sweden) Magdalena Forsberg	(Germany) Uschi Disl	Detail
1	9 December 1995	(Sweden) Östersund	7.5 km Sprint	(Belarus) Svetlana Paramygina	(Russia) Olga Melnik	(Finland) Mari Lampinen	(Belarus) Svetlana Paramygina	Detail
2	14 December 1995	(Norway) Oslo Holmenkollen	15 km Individual	(Sweden) Magdalena Forsberg	(Germany) Petra Behle	(Slovakia) Soňa Mihoková	(Germany) Uschi Disl	Detail
2	16 December 1995	(Norway) Oslo Holmenkollen	7.5 km Sprint	(Germany) Uschi Disl	(Germany) Petra Behle	(Belarus) Svetlana Paramygina	(Germany) Uschi Disl	Detail
3	11 January 1996	(Italy) Antholz-Anterselva	15 km Individual	(Germany) Uschi Disl	(Slovenia) Andreja Grašič	(Germany) Petra Behle	(Germany) Uschi Disl	Detail
3	13 January 1996	(Italy) Antholz-Anterselva	7.5 km Sprint	(Germany) Uschi Disl	(France) Emmanuelle Claret	(Sweden) Magdalena Forsberg	(Germany) Uschi Disl	Detail
4	18 January 1996	(Slovakia) Brezno-Osrblie	15 km Individual	(Slovenia) Andreja Grašič	(Norway) Ann-Elen Skjelbreid	(Norway) Hildegunn Mikkelsplass	(Germany) Uschi Disl	Detail
4	20 January 1996	(Slovakia) Brezno-Osrblie	7.5 km Sprint	(France) Emmanuelle Claret	(France) Florence Baverel	(Slovenia) Andreja Grašič	(Germany) Uschi Disl	Detail
WC	3 February 1996	(Germany) Ruhpolding	15 km Individual	(France) Emmanuelle Claret	(Russia) Olga Melnik	(Ukraine) Olena Petrova	(France) Emmanuelle Claret	Detail
WC	8 February 1996	(Germany) Ruhpolding	7.5 km Sprint	(Russia) Olga Romasko	(Norway) Ann-Elen Skjelbreid	(Sweden) Magdalena Forsberg	(France) Emmanuelle Claret	Detail
5	7 March 1996	(Slovenia) Pokljuka	15 km Individual	(Ukraine) Tetyana Vodopyanova	(Belarus) Natalia Permiakova	(Germany) Katrin Apel	(France) Emmanuelle Claret	Detail
5	9 March 1996	(Slovenia) Pokljuka	7.5 km Sprint	(Germany) Petra Behle	(Germany) Uschi Disl	(China) Yu Shumei	(France) Emmanuelle Claret	Detail
6	14 March 1996	(Austria) Hochfilzen	15 km Individual	(Germany) Simone Greiner-Petter-M.	(Canada) Myriam Bédard	(France) Florence Baverel	(France) Emmanuelle Claret	Detail
6	16 March 1996	(Austria) Hochfilzen	7.5 km Sprint	(Slovakia) Soňa Mihoková	(China) Yu Shumei	(Germany) Simone Greiner-Petter-M.	(France) Emmanuelle Claret	Detail

=== Men's team ===
Event	Date	Place	Discipline	Winner	Second	Third
1	10 December 1995	(Sweden) Östersund	4x7.5 km Relay	Russia Viktor Maigourov; Vladimir Drachev; Pavel Mouslimov; Alexei Kobelev	Germany Ricco Gross; Mark Kirchner; Frank Luck; Sven Fischer	Austria Hannes Obererlacher; Wolfgang Perner; Reinhard Neuner; Ludwig Gredler
2	17 December 1995	(Norway) Holmenkollen	4x7.5 km Relay	Russia Viktor Maigourov; Vladimir Drachev; Sergei Tarasov; Pavel Mouslimov	Germany Ricco Gross; Mark Kirchner; Frank Luck; Sven Fischer	Norway Ole Einar Bjørndalen; Egil Gjelland; Frode Andresen; Jon Åge Tyldum
3	14 January 1996	(Italy) Antholz	4x7.5 km Relay	Russia Viktor Maigourov; Vladimir Drachev; Sergei Tarasov; Alexei Kobelev	Belarus Alexei Aidarov; Oleg Ryzhenkov; Vadim Sashurin; Alexander Popov	Italy Rene Cattarinussi; Wilfried Pallhuber; Patrick Favre; Pieralberto Carrara
4	21 January 1996	(Slovakia) Brezno-Osrblie	Team event	Austria Wolfgang Perner; Martin Pfurtscheller; Reinhard Neuner; Ludwig Gredler	Norway Frode Andresen; Halvard Hanevold; Ole Einar Bjørndalen; Egil Gjelland	Finland Paavo Puurunen; Erkki Latvala; Vesa Hietalahti; Ville Räikkönen
WC	6 February 1996	(Germany) Ruhpolding	Team event	Belarus Vadim Sashurin; Oleg Ryzhenkov; Alexander Popov; Petr Ivashko	Russia Vladimir Drachev; Pavel Mouslimov; Sergei Rozhkov; Viktor Maigourov	Italy Rene Cattarinussi; Pieralberto Carrara; Patrick Favre; Hubert Leitgeb
WC	11 February 1996	(Germany) Ruhpolding	4x7.5 km Relay	Russia Viktor Maigourov; Vladimir Drachev; Sergei Tarasov; Alexei Kobelev	Germany Ricco Gross; Peter Sendel; Frank Luck; Sven Fischer	Belarus Alexei Aidarov; Oleg Ryzhenkov; Vadim Sashurin; Alexander Popov
5	10 March 1996	(Slovenia) Pokljuka	4x7.5 km Relay	Russia Pavel Mouslimov; Vladimir Drachev; Eduard Ryabov; Alexei Kobelev	Norway Ole Einar Bjørndalen; Halvard Hanevold; Frode Andresen; Dag Bjørndalen	Germany Peter Sendel; Frank Luck; Mark Kirchner; Sven Fischer
6	17 March 1996	(Austria) Hochfilzen	4x7.5 km Relay	Norway Ole Einar Bjørndalen; Halvard Hanevold; Frode Andresen; Dag Bjørndalen	Russia Viktor Maigourov; Alexei Kobelev; Sergei Tarasov; Vladimir Drachev	Belarus Alexei Aidarov; Oleg Ryzhenkov; Alexander Popov; Vadim Sashurin

=== Women's team ===
Event	Date	Place	Discipline	Winner	Second	Third
1	10 December 1995	(Sweden) Östersund	4x7.5 km Relay	Germany Uschi Disl; Katrin Apel; Martina Zellner; Petra Behle	Ukraine Tetyana Vodopyanova; Olena Petrova; Olena Zubrilova; Valentina Tserbe-Nessina	Russia Olga Anisimova; Olga Melnik; Galina Kukleva; Irina Mileshina
2	17 December 1995	(Norway) Holmenkollen	4x7.5 km Relay	Germany Uschi Disl; Katrin Apel; Martina Zellner; Petra Behle	Norway Ann-Elen Skjelbreid; Annette Sikveland; Hildegunn Mikkelsplass; Liv Grete Skjelbreid	France Corinne Niogret; Florence Baverel; Emmanuelle Claret; Anne Briand
3	14 January 1996	(Italy) Antholz	4x7.5 km Relay	France Corinne Niogret; Florence Baverel; Emmanuelle Claret; Anne Briand	Germany Uschi Disl; Simone Greiner; Katrin Apel; Petra Behle	Ukraine Tetyana Vodopyanova; Nina Lemesh; Olena Petrova; Olena Zubrilova
WC	10 February 1996	(Germany) Ruhpolding	4x7.5 km Relay	Germany Uschi Disl; Simone Greiner; Katrin Apel; Petra Behle	France Corinne Niogret; Florence Baverel; Emmanuelle Claret; Anne Briand	Ukraine Tetyana Vodopyanova; Valentina Tserbe-Nessina; Olena Petrova; Olena Zubrilova
5	10 March 1996	(Slovenia) Pokljuka	4x7.5 km Relay	France Florence Baverel; Emmanuelle Claret; Anne Briand; Corinne Niogret	Germany Uschi Disl; Simone Greiner; Katrin Apel; Petra Behle	Norway Ann-Elen Skjelbreid; Annette Sikveland; Hildegunn Mikkelsplass; Gunn Margit Andreassen
6	17 March 1996	(Austria) Hochfilzen	4x7.5 km Relay	France Florence Baverel; Emmanuelle Claret; Anne Briand; Corinne Niogret	Norway Ann-Elen Skjelbreid; Annette Sikveland; Hildegunn Mikkelsplass; Gunn Margit Andreassen	Germany Uschi Disl; Simone Greiner; Katrin Apel; Petra Behle

== Standings: Men ==
=== Overall ===
Pos.		Points
1.	(Russia) Vladimir Drachev	276
2.	(Russia) Viktor Maigourov	204
3.	(Germany) Sven Fischer	184
4.	(Italy) Pieralberto Carrara	166
5.	(Austria) Ludwig Gredler	162

- Final standings after 14 races.

=== Individual ===
Pos.		Points
1.	(Russia) Vladimir Drachev	132
2.	(Russia) Sergei Tarasov	92
2.	(Russia) Viktor Maigourov	92
4.	(Germany) Frank Luck	88
5.	(Germany) Ricco Groß	86

- Final standings after 7 races.

=== Sprint ===
Pos.		Points
1.	(Russia) Vladimir Drachev	144
2.	(Austria) Ludwig Gredler	129
3.	(Russia) Viktor Maigourov	112
4.	(Germany) Sven Fischer	111
5.	(Italy) René Cattarinussi	107

- Final standings after 7 races.

=== Nation ===
Pos.		Points
1.	Russia	3889
2.	Germany	3699
3.	Norway	3633
4.	Italy	3508
5.	Belarus	3420

- Final standings after 20 races.

== Standings: Women ==
=== Overall ===
Pos.		Points
1.	(France) Emmanuelle Claret	226
2.	(Germany) Uschi Disl	212
3.	(Germany) Petra Behle	191
4.	(Slovenia) Andreja Grašič	187
5.	(Sweden) Magdalena Wallin	178

- Final standings after 14 races.

=== Individual ===
Pos.		Points
1.	(Slovenia) Andreja Grašič	109
2.	(France) Emmanuelle Claret	108
3.	(Germany) Uschi Disl	99
4.	(Sweden) Magdalena Wallin	94
5.	(Italy) Nathalie Santer	92

- Final standings after 7 races.

=== Sprint ===
Pos.		Points
1.	(France) Emmanuelle Claret	118
2.	(Germany) Uschi Disl	115
3.	(Germany) Petra Behle	103
4.	(Belarus) Svetlana Paramygina	87
5.	(France) Corinne Niogret	86

- Final standings after 7 races.

=== Nation ===
Pos.		Points
1.	France	3746
2.	Germany	3718
3.	Ukraine	3450
4.	Russia	3448
5.	Norway	3446

- Final standings after 20 races.

== Medal table ==
Rank	Nation	Gold	Silver	Bronze	Total
1	Russia	14	10	6	30
2	Germany	11	9	8	28
3	France	5	5	2	12
4	Norway	2	7	4	13
5	Austria	2	1	1	4
6	Belarus	1	2	4	7
7	Ukraine	1	2	3	6
8	Sweden	1	1	3	5
9	Slovenia	1	1	1	3
10	Finland	1	0	2	3
11	Slovakia	1	0	1	2
12	China	0	1	1	2
13	Canada	0	1	0	1
14	Italy	0	0	4	4
Totals (14 entries)		40	40	40	120

== Achievements ==
Victory in this World Cup (all-time number of victories in parentheses)

Men

- Vladimir Drachev (RUS), 5 (6) first places
- Sven Fischer (GER), 2 (5) first places
- Ludwig Gredler (AUT), 2 (4) first places
- Sergei Tarasov (RUS), 1 (3) first place
- Viktor Maigourov (RUS), 1 (3) first place
- Vesa Hietalahti (FIN), 1 (2) first place
- Ole Einar Bjørndalen (NOR), 1 (1) first place
- Sergei Rozhkov (RUS), 1 (1) first place

Women

- Uschi Disl (GER), 4 (8) first places
- Emmanuelle Claret (FRA), 2 (3) first places
- Svetlana Paramygina (BLR), 1 (8) first place
- Magdalena Wallin (SWE), 1 (2) first place
- Petra Behle (GER), 1 (2) first place
- Simone Greiner (GER), 1 (2) first place
- Andreja Grašič (SVN), 1 (1) first place
- Olga Romasko (RUS), 1 (1) first place
- Tetyana Vodopyanova (UKR), 1 (1) first place
- Soňa Mihoková (SVK), 1 (1) first place

== Retirements ==
Following notable biathletes retired during or after the 1995–96 season:

- Jaakko Niemi (FIN)
- Jens Steinigen (GER)
- Johann Passler (ITA)
- Valeri Kiriyenko (RUS)
- Svetlana Petcherskaia (RUS)
