= Biathlon at the 1998 Winter Olympics – Men's relay =

Men's biathlon relay at the XVIII Olympic Winter Games
- Venue: Nozawa Onsen
- Dates: 21 February 1998
- Competitors: 72 from 18 nations
- Winning time: 1:21:36.2

Medalists
1st place, gold medalist(s)		Ricco Groß; Peter Sendel; Sven Fischer; Frank Luck	Germany
2nd place, silver medalist(s)		Egil Gjelland; Halvard Hanevold; Dag Bjørndalen; Ole Einar Bjørndalen	Norway
3rd place, bronze medalist(s)		Pavel Muslimov; Vladimir Drachev; Sergei Tarasov; Viktor Maigourov	Russia

The Men's 4 × 7.5 kilometre biathlon relay competition at the 1998 Winter Olympics 21 February, at Nozawa Onsen. Each national team consisted of four members, with each skiing 7.5 kilometres and shooting twice, once prone and once standing.

At each shooting station, a competitor has eight shots to hit five targets; however, only five bullets are loaded in a magazine at one - if additional shots are required, the spare bullets must be loaded one at a time. If after the eight shots are taken, there are still targets not yet hit, the competitor must ski a 150-metre penalty loop.

== Results ==
Rank	Bib	Country	Time	Penalties (P+S)	Deficit
1st place, gold medalist(s)	4	Germany; Ricco Groß; Peter Sendel; Sven Fischer; Frank Luck	1:21:36.2; 20:09.3; 19:56.6; 20:18.0; 21:12.3	0+4 0+2; 0+0 0+1; 0+0 0+0; 0+2 0+0; 0+2 0+1	–
2nd place, silver medalist(s)	1	Norway; Egil Gjelland; Halvard Hanevold; Dag Bjørndalen; Ole Einar Bjørndalen	1:21:56.3; 20:33.8; 20:08.7; 21:25.0; 19:48.8	0+4 0+3; 0+1 0+1; 0+1 0+0; 0+2 0+2; 0+0 0+0	+20.1
3rd place, bronze medalist(s)	3	Russia; Pavel Muslimov; Vladimir Drachev; Sergei Tarasov; Viktor Maigourov	1:22:19.3; 20:35.9; 19:56.6; 21:01.4; 20:45.4	0+3 0+4; 0+0 0+1; 0+0 0+2; 0+3 0+0; 0+0 0+1	+43.1
4	7	Belarus; Alexei Aidarov; Oleg Ryzhenkov; Alexandr Popov; Vadim Sashurin	1:23:14.0; 20:23.6; 20:18.5; 21:08.3; 21:23.6	0+0 0+4; 0+0 0+0; 0+0 0+3; 0+0 0+1; 0+0 0+0	+1:37.8
5	13	Poland; Wiesław Ziemianin; Tomasz Sikora; Jan Ziemianin; Wojciech Kozub	1:24:09.8; 20:29.7; 20:54.5; 21:34.3; 21:11.3	0+2 0+6; 0+0 0+1; 0+0 0+2; 0+0 0+1; 0+2 0+2	+2:33.6
6	10	Latvia; Oļegs Maļuhins; Ilmārs Bricis; Gundars Upenieks; Jēkabs Nākums	1:24:24.4; 20:18.2; 19:46.7; 22:48.1; 21:31.4	0+6 2+6; 0+2 0+0; 0+1 0+0; 0+3 1+3; 0+0 1+3	+2:48.2
7	6	France; Andreas Heymann; Raphaël Poirée; Thierry Dusserre; Patrice Bailly-Salins	1:24:53.0; 20:44.5; 20:04.4; 22:12.0; 21:52.1	0+4 2+7; 0+1 0+0; 0+2 0+1; 0+1 1+3; 0+0 1+3	+3:16.8
8	5	Finland; Ville Räikkönen; Paavo Puurunen; Harri Eloranta; Olli-Pekka Peltola	1:25:01.4; 20:34.3; 20:08.6; 22:31.0; 21:47.5	0+4 2+7; 0+2 0+0; 0+0 0+1; 0+2 1+3; 0+0 1+3	+3:25.2
9	8	Italy; Patrick Favre; Wilfried Pallhuber; René Cattarinussi; Pieralberto Carrara	1:25:07.3; 21:13.0; 20:50.7; 20:55.9; 22:07.7	0+7 1+10; 0+3 0+3; 0+1 0+1; 0+0 0+3; 0+3 1+3	+3:31.1
10	12	Sweden; Mikael Löfgren; Jonas Eriksson; Tord Wiksten; Fredrik Kuoppa	1:25:25.7; 21:01.0; 21:41.9; 22:09.3; 20:33.5	0+7 0+7; 0+3 0+2; 0+2 0+3; 0+2 0+2; 0+0 0+0	+3:49.5
11	9	Austria; Wolfgang Perner; Ludwig Gredler; Reinhard Neuner; Wolfgang Rottmann	1:25:33.8; 20:32.6; 21:04.8; 22:39.1; 21:17.3	1+6 1+9; 0+1 0+1; 0+0 1+3; 1+3 0+3; 0+2 0+2	+3:57.6
12	2	Slovenia; Sašo Grajf; Jože Poklukar; Janez Ožbolt; Tomaž Globočnik	1:25:43.2; 20:56.6; 21:55.6; 21:45.4; 21:05.6	2+5 0+4; 0+0 0+2; 2+3 0+1; 0+2 0+1; 0+1 0+3	+4:07.0
13	11	Estonia; Janno Prants; Indrek Tobreluts; Kalju Ojaste; Dimitri Borovik	1:26:30.2; 20:39.7; 21:15.3; 23:03.7; 21:31.5	0+4 0+9; 0+0 0+2; 0+0 0+1; 0+3 0+3; 0+1 0+3	+4:54.0
14	16	Czech Republic; Petr Garabík; Zdeněk Vítek; Jiří Holubec; Ivan Masařík	1:26:35.5; 21:30.8; 22:11.8; 22:00.9; 20:52.0	0+0 0+7; 0+0 0+2; 0+0 0+1; 0+0 0+3; 0+0 0+1	+4:59.3
15	17	Japan; Kyoji Suga; Hironao Meguro; Shuichi Sekiya; Atsushi Kazama	1:27:55.7; 22:10.9; 20:56.3; 21:44.0; 23:04.5	2+9 2+9; 1+3 0+2; 0+0 0+3; 0+3 0+1; 1+3 2+3	+6:19.5
16	18	Kazakhstan; Dmitry Pantov; Dmitry Pozdnyakov; Aleksandr Menshchikov; Valery Ivanov	1:27:56.0; 22:37.0; 21:41.2; 21:57.7; 21:40.1	0+5 1+9; 0+1 1+3; 0+0 0+2; 0+1 0+2; 0+3 0+2	+6:19.8
17	15	United States; Jay Hakkinen; Dan Westover; Andrew Erickson; Robert Rosser	1:28:13.9; 20:37.7; 22:14.0; 22:57.2; 22:25.0	0+8 0+7; 0+2 0+2; 0+3 0+1; 0+2 0+3; 0+1 0+1	+6:37.7
18	14	Ukraine; Vyacheslav Derkach; Ruslan Lysenko; Mykola Krupnyk; Andriy Deryzemlya	1:28:57.1; 21:29.0; 21:41.9; 21:54.2; 23:52.0	3+6 1+7; 0+1 0+2; 0+1 0+1; 0+1 0+1; 3+3 1+3	+7:20.9
