= 1992–93 Biathlon World Cup =

Biathlon competition

1992–93 World Cup
Discipline	Men	Women
Overall	(Sweden) Mikael Löfgren	(Russia) Anfisa Reztsova
Nations Cup	Germany	France
Individual	(Sweden) Mikael Löfgren	(Russia) Anfisa Reztsova
Sprint	(Germany) Sven Fischer	(Russia) Anfisa Reztsova

Competition

The 1992–93 Biathlon World Cup was a multi-race tournament over a season of biathlon, organised by the Union Internationale de Pentathlon Moderne. The season started on 17 December 1992 in Pokljuka, Slovenia, and ended on 21 March 1993 in Kontiolahti, Finland. It was the 16th season of the Biathlon World Cup.

== Calendar ==
Below is the IBU World Cup calendar for the 1992–93 season.

Location	Date	Individual	Sprint	Pursuit	Mass start	Relay
(Slovenia) Pokljuka	17–19 December	●	●			●
(Germany) Oberhof	15–17 January	●	●			●
(Italy) Antholz	21–24 January	●	●			●
(Bulgaria) Borovec	9–14 February	●	●			●
(Norway) Lillehammer	4–7 March	●	●			●
(Sweden) Östersund	11–14 March	●	●			●
(Finland) Kontiolahti	18–21 March	●	●			●
Total		6	6	0	0	6

- Results from the World Championships did not count toward the World Cup.
- The relays were technically unofficial races as they did not count towards anything in the World Cup.

== World Cup Podium ==
=== Men ===
Stage	Date	Place	Discipline	Winner	Second	Third	Yellow bib (After competition)	Det.
1	17 December 1992	(Slovenia) Pokljuka	20 km Individual	(France) Patrice Bailly-Salins	(Germany) Mark Kirchner	(Germany) Jens Steinigen	(France) Patrice Bailly-Salins	Detail
1	19 December 1992	(Slovenia) Pokljuka	10 km Sprint	(Germany) Mark Kirchner	(Norway) Jon Åge Tyldum	(Belarus) Oleg Ryzhenkov	(Germany) Mark Kirchner	Detail
2	15 January 1993	(Germany) Oberhof	20 km Individual	(Italy) Andreas Zingerle	(Russia) Valeriy Medvedtsev	(Austria) Alfred Eder	(Germany) Mark Kirchner	Detail
2	16 January 1993	(Germany) Oberhof	10 km Sprint	(Italy) Johann Passler	(Sweden) Ulf Johansson	(France) Gilles Marguet	(Sweden) Mikael Löfgren	Detail
3	21 January 1993	(Italy) Antholz-Anterselva	20 km Individual	(Sweden) Ulf Johansson	(Sweden) Fredrik Kuoppa	(Italy) Elmar Mutschlechner	(Sweden) Mikael Löfgren	Detail
3	23 January 1993	(Italy) Antholz-Anterselva	10 km Sprint	(Italy) Pieralberto Carrara	(Sweden) Mikael Löfgren	(Germany) Ricco Groß	(Sweden) Mikael Löfgren	Detail
4	4 March 1993	(Norway) Lillehammer	20 km Individual	(Italy) Wilfried Pallhuber	(Germany) Ricco Groß	(Italy) Andreas Zingerle	(Sweden) Mikael Löfgren	Detail
4	6 March 1993	(Norway) Lillehammer	10 km Sprint	(Germany) Frank Luck	(Germany) Sven Fischer	(Austria) Ludwig Gredler	(Sweden) Mikael Löfgren	Detail
5	11 March 1993	(Sweden) Östersund	20 km Individual	(Germany) Mark Kirchner	(Sweden) Mikael Löfgren	(Finland) Jaakko Niemi	(Sweden) Mikael Löfgren	Detail
5	13 March 1993	(Sweden) Östersund	10 km Sprint	(Norway) Jon Åge Tyldum	(Belarus) Alexandr Popov	(Germany) Sven Fischer	(Sweden) Mikael Löfgren	Detail
6	18 March 1993	(Finland) Kontiolahti	20 km Individual	(Austria) Ludwig Gredler	(France) Patrice Bailly-Salins	(Italy) Johann Passler	(Sweden) Mikael Löfgren	Detail
6	20 March 1993	(Finland) Kontiolahti	10 km Sprint	(Germany) Sven Fischer	(France) Patrice Bailly-Salins	(Germany) Jens Steinigen	(Sweden) Mikael Löfgren	Detail

=== Women ===
Stage	Date	Place	Discipline	Winner	Second	Third	Yellow bib (After competition)	Det.
1	17 December 1992	(Slovenia) Pokljuka	15 km Individual	(France) Anne Briand	(Czechoslovakia) Eva Háková	(France) Corinne Niogret	(France) Anne Briand	Detail
1	19 December 1992	(Slovenia) Pokljuka	7.5 km Sprint	(Germany) Petra Schaaf	(Belarus) Svetlana Paramygina	(France) Anne Briand	(France) Anne Briand	Detail
2	15 January 1993	(Germany) Oberhof	15 km Individual	(Russia) Anfisa Reztsova	(France) Corinne Niogret	(Czech Republic) Eva Háková	(France) Anne Briand	Detail
2	16 January 1993	(Germany) Oberhof	7.5 km Sprint	(Russia) Anfisa Reztsova	(Germany) Uschi Disl	(France) Anne Briand	(France) Anne Briand	Detail
3	21 January 1993	(Italy) Antholz-Anterselva	15 km Individual	(Bulgaria) Iva Shkodreva	(Canada) Myriam Bédard	(Italy) Nathalie Santer	(France) Anne Briand	Detail
3	23 January 1993	(Italy) Antholz-Anterselva	7.5 km Sprint	(Germany) Antje Misersky	(Ukraine) Nadiya Billova	(Russia) Anfisa Reztsova	(France) Anne Briand	Detail
4	4 March 1993	(Norway) Lillehammer	15 km Individual	(Russia) Anfisa Reztsova	(Italy) Nathalie Santer	(Canada) Myriam Bédard	(Russia) Anfisa Reztsova	Detail
4	6 March 1993	(Norway) Lillehammer	7.5 km Sprint	(Russia) Anfisa Reztsova	(Belarus) Svetlana Paramygina	(Germany) Antje Misersky	(Russia) Anfisa Reztsova	Detail
5	11 March 1993	(Sweden) Östersund	15 km Individual	(Slovakia) Martina Jašicová	(Italy) Nathalie Santer	(Bulgaria) Iva Shkodreva	(Russia) Anfisa Reztsova	Detail
5	13 March 1993	(Sweden) Östersund	7.5 km Sprint	(Russia) Anfisa Reztsova	(Canada) Myriam Bédard	(Italy) Nathalie Santer	(Russia) Anfisa Reztsova	Detail
6	18 March 1993	(Finland) Kontiolahti	15 km Individual	(Germany) Antje Misersky	(Russia) Anfisa Reztsova	(France) Véronique Claudel	(Russia) Anfisa Reztsova	Detail
6	20 March 1993	(Finland) Kontiolahti	7.5 km Sprint	(Russia) Anfisa Reztsova	(Russia) Elena Belova	(France) Delphyne Burlet	(Russia) Anfisa Reztsova	Detail

=== Men's team ===
Event	Date	Place	Discipline	Winner	Second	Third
1	20 December 1992	(Slovenia) Pokljuka	4x7.5 km Relay	Austria Bruno Hofstätter; Ludwig Gredler; Wolfgang Perner; Franz Schuler	Russia Valeriy Medvedtsev; Valeri Kiriyenko; Alexei Kobelev; Sergei Tchepikov	Norway Eirik Kvalfoss; Jon Age Tyldum; Jo Severin Matberg; Frode Loberg
2	17 January 1993	(Germany) Oberhof	4x7.5 km Relay	Italy Andreas Zingerle; Johann Passler; Pieralberto Carrara; Wilfried Pallhuber	Russia Sergei Tchepikov; Sergei Tarasov; Alexei Kobelev; Valeri Kiriyenko	Germany Ricco Gross; Frank Luck; Mark Kirchner; Fritz Fischer
3	24 January 1993	(Italy) Antholz	4x7.5 km Relay	Sweden Ulf Johansson; Tord Wiksten; Leif Andersson; Mikael Löfgren	Norway Eirik Kvalfoss; Jon Age Tyldum; Ilvar Ulekleiv; Frode Loberg	Germany Ricco Gross; Frank Luck; Mark Kirchner; Jens Steinigen
4	7 March 1993	(Norway) Lillehammer	4x7.5 km Relay	Sweden Mikael Löfgren; Anders Mannelqvist; Fredrik Kuoppa; Ulf Johansson	Germany Ricco Gross; Frank Luck; Mark Kirchner; Sven Fischer	France Lionel Laurent; Patrice Bailly-Salins; Thierry Dusserre; Hervé Flandin
5	14 March 1993	(Sweden) Östersund	4x7.5 km Relay	Germany Ricco Gross; Jens Steinigen; Mark Kirchner; Sven Fischer	Belarus Viktor Maigourov; Igor Khokhriakov; Oleg Ryzhenkov; Alexander Popov	Italy Hubert Leitgeb; Wilfried Pallhuber; Edmund Zitturi; Elmar Mutschlechner
6	21 March 1993	(Finland) Kontiolahti	4x7.5 km Relay	Russia Valeriy Medvedtsev; Valeri Kiriyenko; Alexei Kobelev; Sergei Tchepikov	Germany Jens Steinigen; Ricco Gross; Sven Fischer; Frank Luck	France Gilles Marguet; Patrice Bailly-Salins; Christian Dumont; Hervé Flandin

=== Women's team ===
Event	Date	Place	Discipline	Winner	Second	Third
1	20 December 1992	(Slovenia) Pokljuka	4x6 km Relay	Germany Uschi Disl; Antje Misersky; Inga Schneider; Petra Schaaf	France Corinne Niogret; Veronique Claudel; Delphyne Burlet; Anne Briand	Czechoslovakia Gabriela Suvová; Eva Háková; Jana Kulhavá; Jiřina Adamičková
2	17 January 1993	(Germany) Oberhof	4x6 km Sprint	Russia Olga Simushina; Svetlana Panyutina; Elena Belova; Anfisa Reztsova	France Corinne Niogret; Veronique Claudel; Delphyne Burlet; Anne Briand	Czech Republic Jana Kulhavá; Petra Nosková; Iveta Knížková; Helena Garabíková
4	7 March 1993	(Norway) Lillehammer	4x6 km Relay	France Corinne Niogret; Veronique Claudel; Delphyne Burlet; Anne Briand	Russia Olga Simushina; Elena Belova; Tamara Volkova; Anfisa Reztsova	Norway Signe Trosten; Annette Sikveland; Gunn Margit Andreassen; Hildegunn Fossen
5	14 March 1993	(Sweden) Östersund	4x6 km Relay	Norway Elin Kristiansen; Annette Sikveland; Signe Trosten; Hildegunn Fossen	France Corinne Niogret; Veronique Claudel; Delphyne Burlet; Anne Briand	Czech Republic Jana Kulhavá; Jiřina Adamičková; Iveta Knížková; Eva Háková
6	21 March 1993	(Finland) Kontiolahti	4x6 km Relay	Norway Elin Kristiansen; Annette Sikveland; Signe Trosten; Hildegunn Fossen	Russia Olga Simushina; Elena Belova; Nadezhda Talanova; Anfisa Reztsova	Czech Republic Jana Kulhavá; Jiřina Adamičková; Irena Novotná; Eva Háková

== Standings: Men ==
=== Overall ===
Pos.		Points
1.	(Sweden) Mikael Löfgren	168
2.	(Germany) Mark Kirchner	151
3.	(Italy) Pieralberto Carrara	147
4.	(France) Patrice Bailly-Salins	146
5.	(Italy) Johann Passler	139

- Final standings after 12 races.

=== Individual ===
Pos.		Points
1.	(Sweden) Mikael Löfgren	85
2.	(Italy) Andreas Zingerle	76
3.	(Italy) Wilfried Pallhuber	75
4.	(Italy) Johann Passler	70
5.	(Russia) Sergei Tchepikov	70

- Final standings after 6 races.

=== Sprint ===
Pos.		Points
1.	(Germany) Sven Fischer	101
2.	(Germany) Mark Kirchner	88
3.	(Austria) Ludwig Gredler	86
4.	(Sweden) Mikael Löfgren	83
5.	(Italy) Pieralberto Carrara	80

- Final standings after 6 races.

=== Nation ===
Pos.		Points
1.	Germany	5966
2.	Italy	5342
3.	Russia	5223
4.	Sweden	5220
5.	France	4879

- Final standings after 18 races.

== Standings: Women ==
=== Overall ===
Pos.		Points
1.	(Russia) Anfisa Reztsova	225
2.	(Canada) Myriam Bédard	183
3.	(France) Anne Briand	163
4.	(Italy) Nathalie Santer	160
5.	(Germany) Petra Schaaf	149

- Final standings after 12 races.

=== Individual ===
Pos.		Points
1.	(Russia) Anfisa Reztsova	105
2.	(Italy) Nathalie Santer	97
3.	(Canada) Myriam Bédard	93
4.	(France) Corinne Niogret	88
5.	(France) Anne Briand	79

- Final standings after 6 races.

=== Sprint ===
Pos.		Points
1.	(Russia) Anfisa Reztsova	120
2.	(Canada) Myriam Bédard	90
3.	(France) Anne Briand	84
4.	(France) Delphyne Burlet	82
5.	(Germany) Antje Misersky	81

- Final standings after 6 races.

=== Nation ===
Pos.		Points
1.	France	5421
2.	Russia	5392
3.	Czech Republic	5345
4.	Germany	5117
5.	Norway	5103

- Final standings after 18 races.

== Medal table ==
Rank	Nation	Gold	Silver	Bronze	Total
1	Germany	9	6	7	22
2	Russia	8	7	1	16
3	Italy	5	2	6	13
4	France	3	6	8	17
5	Sweden	3	4	0	7
6	Norway	3	2	2	7
7	Austria	2	0	2	4
8	Bulgaria	1	0	1	2
9	Slovakia	1	0	0	1
10	Belarus	0	4	1	5
11	Canada	0	2	1	3
12	Czech Republic	0	1	5	6
13	Ukraine	0	1	0	1
14	Finland	0	0	1	1
Totals (14 entries)		35	35	35	105

== Achievements ==
Victory in this World Cup (all-time number of victories in parentheses)

Men

- Mark Kirchner (GER), 2 (6) first places
- Andreas Zingerle (ITA), 1 (3) first place
- Johann Passler (ITA), 1 (3) first place
- Frank Luck (GER), 1 (3) first place
- Patrice Bailly-Salins (FRA), 1 (2) first place
- Pieralberto Carrara (ITA), 1 (2) first place
- Wilfried Pallhuber (ITA), 1 (2) first place
- Ulf Johansson (SWE), 1 (1) first place
- Jon Åge Tyldum (NOR), 1 (1) first place
- Ludwig Gredler (AUT), 1 (1) first place
- Sven Fischer (GER), 1 (1) first place

Women

- Anfisa Reztsova (RUS), 6 (10) first places
- Antje Misersky (GER), 2 (4) first places
- Iva Shkodreva (BUL), 1 (3) first place
- Anne Briand (FRA), 1 (1) first place
- Petra Schaaf (GER), 1 (1) first place
- Martina Jašicová (SVK), 1 (1) first place

== Retirements ==
Following notable biathletes retired during or after the 1992–93 season:

- Thierry Gerbier (FRA)
- Fritz Fischer (GER)
- Frode Loberg (NOR)
- Geir Einang (NOR)
- Gisle Fenne (NOR)
- Seija Hyytiäinen (FIN)
- Inga Kesper (GER)
- Siri Grundnes (NOR)
