= 1994–95 Biathlon World Cup =

Biathlon competition

1994–95 World Cup
Discipline	Men	Women
Overall	(Norway) Jon Åge Tyldum	(France) Anne Briand
Nations Cup	Italy	France
Individual	(Italy) Patrick Favre	(Belarus) Svetlana Paramygina
Sprint	(Norway) Ole Einar Bjørndalen	(France) Anne Briand

Competition

The 1994–95 Biathlon World Cup was a multi-race tournament over a season of biathlon, organised by the International Biathlon Union. The season started on 8 December 1994 in Bad Gastein, Austria, and ended on 19 March 1995 in Lillehammer, Norway. It was the 18th season of the Biathlon World Cup.

== Calendar ==
Below is the IBU World Cup calendar for the 1994–95 season.

Location	Date	Individual	Sprint	Pursuit	Mass start	Relay
(Austria) Bad Gastein	8–11 December	●	●			●
(Austria) Bad Gastein	15–18 December	●	●			●
(Germany) Oberhof	19–22 January	●	●			
(Germany) Ruhpolding	26–29 January	●	●			●
(Italy) Antholz	14–19 February	●	●			●
(Finland) Lahti	9–12 March	●	●			●
(Norway) Lillehammer	16–19 March	●	●			●
Total		7	7	0	0	6

== World Cup Podium ==
=== Men ===
Stage	Date	Place	Discipline	Winner	Second	Third	Yellow bib (After competition)	Det.
1	8 December 1994	(Austria) Bad Gastein	20 km Individual	(Russia) Vladimir Drachev	(Poland) Tomasz Sikora	(Kazakhstan) Dmitry Pantov	(Russia) Vladimir Drachev	Detail
1	10 December 1994	(Austria) Bad Gastein	10 km Sprint	(Norway) Jon Åge Tyldum	(Norway) Ole Einar Bjørndalen	(Russia) Alexei Kobelev	(Russia) Vladimir Drachev	Detail
2	15 December 1994	(Austria) Bad Gastein (2)	20 km Individual	(Italy) Patrick Favre	(Belarus) Vadim Sashurin	(Finland) Jaakko Niemi	(Norway) Jon Åge Tyldum	Detail
2	16 December 1994	(Austria) Bad Gastein (2)	10 km Sprint	(Norway) Sylfest Glimsdal	(Belarus) Oleg Ryzhenkov	(Germany) Frank Luck	(Norway) Jon Åge Tyldum	Detail
3	19 January 1995	(Germany) Oberhof	20 km Individual	(Italy) Wilfried Pallhuber	(France) Patrice Bailly-Salins	(Russia) Eduard Ryabov	(Norway) Jon Åge Tyldum	Detail
3	21 January 1995	(Germany) Oberhof	10 km Sprint	(Russia) Alexei Kobelev	(Germany) Ricco Groß	(Norway) Ole Einar Bjørndalen	(Norway) Jon Åge Tyldum	Detail
4	26 January 1995	(Germany) Ruhpolding	20 km Individual	(France) Patrice Bailly-Salins	(Sweden) Fredrik Kuoppa	(Germany) Ricco Groß	(Norway) Jon Åge Tyldum	Detail
4	28 January 1995	(Germany) Ruhpolding	10 km Sprint	(Belarus) Oleg Ryzhenkov	(Austria) Ludwig Gredler	(Italy) Patrick Favre	(Norway) Ole Einar Bjørndalen	Detail
WC	16 February 1995	(Italy) Antholz-Anterselva	20 km Individual	(Poland) Tomasz Sikora	(Norway) Jon Åge Tyldum	(Belarus) Oleg Ryzhenkov	(Norway) Jon Åge Tyldum	Detail
WC	18 February 1995	(Italy) Antholz-Anterselva	10 km Sprint	(France) Patrice Bailly-Salins	(Russia) Pavel Mouslimov	(Germany) Ricco Groß	(Norway) Jon Åge Tyldum	Detail
5	9 March 1995	(Finland) Lahti	20 km Individual	(Austria) Ludwig Gredler	(France) Hervé Flandin	(Italy) Wilfried Pallhuber	(Norway) Jon Åge Tyldum	Detail
5	11 March 1995	(Finland) Lahti	10 km Sprint	(Belarus) Oleg Ryzhenkov	(Germany) Sven Fischer	(Slovenia) Matjaž Poklukar	(Norway) Jon Åge Tyldum	Detail
6	16 March 1995	(Norway) Lillehammer	20 km Individual	(Finland) Vesa Hietalahti	(Austria) Ludwig Gredler	(Germany) Peter Sendel	(Norway) Jon Åge Tyldum	Detail
6	18 March 1995	(Norway) Lillehammer	10 km Sprint	(Russia) Viktor Maigourov	(Italy) Johann Passler	(Norway) Ole Einar Bjørndalen	(Norway) Jon Åge Tyldum	Detail

=== Women ===
Stage	Date	Place	Discipline	Winner	Second	Third	Yellow bib (After competition)	Det.
1	8 December 1994	(Austria) Bad Gastein	15 km Individual	(France) Anne Briand	(Germany) Simone Greiner-Petter-M.	(Belarus) Svetlana Paramygina	(France) Anne Briand	Detail
1	10 December 1994	(Austria) Bad Gastein	7.5 km Sprint	(Norway) Hildegunn Mikkelsplass	(Norway) Elin Kristiansen	(Russia) Irina Mileshina	(Belarus) Svetlana Paramygina	Detail
2	14 December 1994	(Austria) Bad Gastein	15 km Individual	(Germany) Petra Behle	(France) Anne Briand	(Ukraine) Valentina Tserbe-Nessina	(France) Anne Briand	Detail
2	16 December 1994	(Austria) Bad Gastein	7.5 km Sprint	(Germany) Simone Greiner-Petter-M.	(Germany) Antje Harvey	(Germany) Uschi Disl	(France) Anne Briand	Detail
3	19 January 1995	(Germany) Oberhof	15 km Individual	(Germany) Uschi Disl	(Germany) Simone Greiner-Petter-M.	(Bulgaria) Iva Shkodreva	(France) Anne Briand	Detail
3	21 January 1995	(Germany) Oberhof	7.5 km Sprint	(France) Anne Briand	(Russia) Nadezhda Talanova	(Finland) Mari Lampinen	(France) Anne Briand	Detail
4	26 January 1995	(Germany) Ruhpolding	15 km Individual	(Belarus) Svetlana Paramygina	(France) Florence Baverel	(Italy) Nathalie Santer	(France) Anne Briand	Detail
4	28 January 1995	(Germany) Ruhpolding	7.5 km Sprint	(Sweden) Magdalena Wallin	(France) Florence Baverel	(Russia) Nadezhda Talanova	(France) Anne Briand	Detail
WC	16 February 1995	(Italy) Antholz-Anterselva	15 km Individual	(France) Corinne Niogret	(Germany) Uschi Disl	(Bulgaria) Ekaterina Dafovska	(France) Anne Briand	Detail
WC	18 February 1995	(Italy) Antholz-Anterselva	7.5 km Sprint	(France) Anne Briand	(Germany) Uschi Disl	(France) Corinne Niogret	(France) Anne Briand	Detail
5	9 March 1995	(Finland) Lahti	15 km Individual	(Slovakia) Martina Jašicová	(Slovenia) Andreja Grašič	(France) Corinne Niogret	(France) Anne Briand	Detail
5	11 March 1995	(Finland) Lahti	7.5 km Sprint	(Belarus) Svetlana Paramygina	(Russia) Galina Koukleva	(France) Emmanuelle Claret	(France) Anne Briand	Detail
6	16 March 1995	(Norway) Lillehammer	15 km Individual	(Belarus) Svetlana Paramygina	(Russia) Nadezhda Talanova	(Russia) Galina Koukleva	(France) Anne Briand	Detail
6	18 March 1995	(Norway) Lillehammer	7.5 km Sprint	(Russia) Galina Koukleva	(France) Anne Briand	(France) Emmanuelle Claret	(France) Anne Briand	Detail

=== Men's team ===
Event	Date	Place	Discipline	Winner	Second	Third
1	11 December 1994	(Austria) Bad Gastein	4x7.5 km Relay	Russia Viktor Maigourov; Vladimir Drachev; Eduard Ryabov; Alexei Kobelev	Italy Rene Cattarinussi; Andreas Zingerle; Pieralberto Carrara; Patrick Favre	Norway Frode Andresen; Halvard Hanevold; Ivar Ulekleiv; Jon Åge Tyldum
2	17 December 1994	(Austria) Bad Gastein	4x7.5 km Relay	Russia Pavel Mouslimov; Vladimir Drachev; Valeri Gaevoi; Alexei Kobelev	Norway Ole Einar Bjørndalen; Halvard Hanevold; Sylfest Glimsdal; Jon Åge Tyldum	Germany Ricco Gross; Peter Sendel; Frank Luck; Sven Fischer
3	22 January 1995	(Germany) Oberhof	Team event	Germany Frank Luck; Carsten Heymann; Ricco Gross; Sven Fischer	Austria Wolfgang Perner; Anton Lengauer-Stockner; Ludwig Gredler; Hannes Obererlacher	Sweden Per Brandt; Anders Mannelqvist; Fredrik Kuoppa; Jonas Eriksson
4	29 January 1995	(Germany) Ruhpolding	4x7.5 km Relay	Germany Ricco Gross; Peter Sendel; Frank Luck; Sven Fischer	Italy Rene Cattarinussi; Wilfried Pallhuber; Patrick Favre; Pieralberto Carrara	Austria Hannes Obererlacher; Wolfgang Perner; Reinhard Neuner; Ludwig Gredler
WC	14 February 1995	(Italy) Antholz	Team event	Norway Frode Andresen; Dag Bjørndalen; Halvard Hanevold; Jon Åge Tyldum	Czech Republic Petr Garabík; Roman Dostál; Jiří Holubec; Ivan Masařík	France Thierry Dusserre; Franck Perrot; Lionel Laurent; Stéphane Bouthiaux
WC	19 February 1995	(Italy) Antholz	4x7.5 km Relay	Germany Ricco Gross; Mark Kirchner; Frank Luck; Sven Fischer	France Lionel Laurent; Patrice Bailly-Salins; Thierry Dusserre; Hervé Flandin	Belarus Igor Khokhriakov; Alexander Popov; Oleg Ryzhenkov; Vadim Sashurin
5	12 March 1995	(Finland) Lahti	4x7.5 km Relay	Russia Viktor Maigourov; Vladimir Drachev; Eduard Ryabov; Alexei Kobelev	France Franck Perrot; Patrice Bailly-Salins; Thierry Dusserre; Hervé Flandin	Finland Vesa Hietalahti; Ville Raikkonen; Harri Eloranta; Erkki Latvala
6	19 March 1995	(Norway) Lillehammer	4x7.5 km Relay	Norway Ole Einar Bjørndalen; Jon Åge Tyldum; Frode Andresen; Kjell Ove Oftedal	France Raphael Poiree; Patrice Bailly-Salins; Thierry Dusserre; Hervé Flandin	Germany Peter Sendel; Jens Steinigen; Carsten Heymann; Sven Fischer

=== Women's team ===
Event	Date	Place	Discipline	Winner	Second	Third
1	11 December 1994	(Austria) Bad Gastein	4x7.5 km Relay	France Corinne Niogret; Veronique Claudel; Emmanuelle Claret; Anne Briand	Norway Elin Kristiansen; Ase Idland; Annette Sikveland; Hildegunn Fossen	Germany Uschi Disl; Antje Harvey; Simone Greiner; Petra Behle
2	17 December 1994	(Austria) Bad Gastein	4x7.5 km Relay	Norway Ase Idland; Annette Sikveland; Hildegunn Fossen; Elin Kristiansen	Germany Antje Harvey; Uschi Disl; Simone Greiner; Petra Behle	France Corinne Niogret; Veronique Claudel; Emmanuelle Claret; Anne Briand
4	29 January 1995	(Germany) Ruhpolding	4x7.5 km Relay	Germany Uschi Disl; Antje Harvey; Simone Greiner; Petra Behle	Russia Nadezhda Talanova; Svetlana Petcherskaia; Galina Kukleva; Anfisa Reztsova	France Corinne Niogret; Emmanuelle Claret; Florence Baverel; Anne Briand
WC	19 February 1995	(Italy) Antholz	4x7.5 km Relay	Germany Uschi Disl; Antje Harvey; Simone Greiner; Petra Behle	France Corinne Niogret; Veronique Claudel; Florence Baverel; Anne Briand	Norway Ann-Elen Skjelbreid; Hildegunn Fossen; Annette Sikveland; Gunn Margit Andreassen
5	12 March 1995	(Finland) Lahti	4x7.5 km Relay	Germany Uschi Disl; Antje Harvey; Simone Greiner; Petra Behle	Norway Ann-Elen Skjelbreid; Liv Grete Skjelbreid; Hildegunn Fossen; Elin Kristiansen	Russia Olga Melnik; Nadezhda Talanova; Irina Mileshina; Galina Kukleva
6	19 March 1995	(Norway) Lillehammer	4x7.5 km Relay	France Florence Baverel; Emmanuelle Claret; Anne Briand; Corinne Niogret	Germany Uschi Disl; Antje Harvey; Simone Greiner; Petra Behle	Norway Ann-Elen Skjelbreid; Liv Grete Skjelbreid; Annette Sikveland; Elin Kristiansen

== Standings: Men ==
=== Overall ===
Pos.		Points
1.	(Norway) Jon Åge Tyldum	195
2.	(Italy) Patrick Favre	193
3.	(Italy) Wilfried Pallhuber	178
4.	(Norway) Ole Einar Bjørndalen	178
5.	(Belarus) Oleg Ryzhenkov	169

- Final standings after 14 races.

=== Individual ===
Pos.		Points
1.	(Italy) Patrick Favre	105
2.	(Italy) Wilfried Pallhuber	103
3.	(Norway) Jon Åge Tyldum	100
4.	(Poland) Tomasz Sikora	99
5.	(Russia) Eduard Ryabov	85

- Final standings after 7 races.

=== Sprint ===
Pos.		Points
1.	(Norway) Ole Einar Bjørndalen	115
2.	(Belarus) Oleg Ryzhenkov	105
3.	(Russia) Pavel Mouslimov	96
4.	(Norway) Jon Åge Tyldum	95
5.	(Italy) Patrick Favre	88

- Final standings after 7 races.

=== Nation ===
Pos.		Points
1.	Italy	3737
2.	Germany	3713
3.	Russia	3589
4.	Norway	3508
5.	France	3496

- Final standings after 20 races.

== Standings: Women ==
=== Overall ===
Pos.		Points
1.	(France) Anne Briand	241
2.	(Belarus) Svetlana Paramygina	232
3.	(Germany) Uschi Disl	220
4.	(France) Corinne Niogret	208
5.	(Sweden) Magdalena Wallin	178

- Final standings after 14 races.

=== Individual ===
Pos.		Points
1.	(Belarus) Svetlana Paramygina	128
2.	(Germany) Uschi Disl	114
3.	(France) Anne Briand	111
4.	(France) Corinne Niogret	103
5.	(France) Florence Baverel	92

- Final standings after 7 races.

=== Sprint ===
Pos.		Points
1.	(France) Anne Briand	130
2.	(Germany) Uschi Disl	106
3.	(Belarus) Svetlana Paramygina	105
4.	(France) Corinne Niogret	105
5.	(Norway) Hildegunn Fossen	95

- Final standings after 7 races.

=== Nation ===
Pos.		Points
1.	France	3796
2.	Germany	3692
3.	Russia	3497
4.	Norway	3488
5.	Ukraine	3396

- Final standings after 20 races.

== Medal table ==
Rank	Nation	Gold	Silver	Bronze	Total
1	France	8	10	6	24
2	Germany	8	9	8	25
3	Russia	7	5	6	18
4	Norway	5	6	5	16
5	Belarus	5	2	3	10
6	Italy	2	3	3	8
7	Austria	1	2	1	4
8	Poland	1	1	0	2
8	Sweden	1	1	0	2
10	Finland	1	0	3	4
11	Slovakia	1	0	0	1
12	Slovenia	0	1	1	2
13	Bulgaria	0	0	2	2
14	Kazakhstan	0	0	1	1
14	Ukraine	0	0	1	1
Totals (15 entries)		40	40	40	120

== Achievements ==
Victory in this World Cup (all-time number of victories in parentheses)

Men

- Patrice Bailly-Salins (FRA), 2 (7) first places
- Oleg Ryzhenkov (BLR), 2 (2) first places
- Wilfried Pallhuber (ITA), 1 (4) first place
- Jon Åge Tyldum (NOR), 1 (2) first place
- Patrick Favre (ITA), 1 (2) first place
- Sylfest Glimsdal (NOR), 1 (2) first place
- Ludwig Gredler (AUT), 1 (2) first place
- Viktor Maigourov (RUS), 1 (2) first place
- Vladimir Drachev (RUS), 1 (1) first place
- Alexei Kobelev (RUS), 1 (1) first place
- Tomasz Sikora (POL), 1 (1) first place
- Vesa Hietalahti (FIN), 1 (1) first place

Women

- Svetlana Paramygina (BLR), 3 (7) first places
- Anne Briand (FRA), 3 (6) first places
- Uschi Disl (GER), 1 (4) first place
- Martina Jašicová (SVK), 1 (2) first place
- Hildegunn Fossen (NOR), 1 (1) first place
- Petra Behle (GER), 1 (1) first place
- Simone Greiner (GER), 1 (1) first place
- Magdalena Wallin (SWE), 1 (1) first place
- Corinne Niogret (FRA), 1 (1) first place
- Galina Kukleva (RUS), 1 (1) first place

== Retirements ==
Following notable biathletes retired after the 1994–95 season:

- Alfred Eder (AUT)
- Andreas Zingerle (ITA)
- Evgeny Redkin (BLR)
- Ulf Johansson (SWE)
- Antje Harvey (GER)
- Elin Kristiansen (NOR)
- Nadezhda Aleksieva (BUL)
- Luisa Tcherepanova (RUS)
- Nadiya Billova (UKR)
