= Ludwig Gredler =

Austrian biathlete

Personal information
- Full name: Ludwig Gredler
- Nickname: Luggi
- Born: 19 November 1967 (age 58) Hall in Tirol, Tyrol, Austria
- Height: 1.81 m (5 ft 11 in)

Sport

Professional information
- Sport: Biathlon
- Club: WSV Tux

Olympic Games
- Teams: 5 (1992, 1994, 1998, 2002, 2006)
- Medals: 0

World Championships
- Teams: 16 (1991, 1992, 1993, 1994, 1995, 1996, 1997, 1998, 1999, 2000, 2001, 2002, 2003, 2004, 2005, 2007)
- Medals: 2 (0 gold)

World Cup
- Seasons: 18 (1990/91–2007/08)
- Individual victories: 6
- All victories: 11
- Individual podiums: 17
- All podiums: 28
Medal record
Men's biathlon
Representing Austria
World Championships
Silver medal – second place	2000 Oslo Holmenkollen	20 km individual
Bronze medal – third place	1997 Brezno-Osrblie	20 km individual

Ludwig Gredler (born 19 November 1967) is a former Austrian biathlete. In 2014, he was appointed as a coach for the Austrian men's biathlon team.

== Biathlon results ==
All results are sourced from the International Biathlon Union.

=== Olympic Games ===
Event	Individual	Sprint	Pursuit	Mass start	Relay
(France) 1992 Albertville	—	11th	—N/a	—N/a	12th
(Norway) 1994 Lillehammer	18th	5th	—N/a	—N/a	9th
(Japan) 1998 Nagano	12th	11th	—N/a	—N/a	11th
(United States) 2002 Salt Lake City	11th	10th	4th	—N/a	6th
(Italy) 2006 Turin	41st	52nd	45th	—	17th

*Pursuit was added as an event in 2002, with mass start being added in 2006.

=== World Championships ===
2 medals (1 silver, 1 bronze)

Event	Individual	Sprint	Pursuit	Mass start	Team	Relay	Mixed relay
(Finland) 1991 Lahti	—	28th	—N/a	—N/a	—	12th	—N/a
(Russia) 1992 Novosibirsk	—N/a	—N/a	—N/a	—N/a	5th	—N/a	—N/a
(Bulgaria) 1993 Borovets	5th	22nd	—N/a	—N/a	4th	14th	—N/a
(Canada) 1994 Canmore	—N/a	—N/a	—N/a	—N/a	6th	—N/a	—N/a
(Italy) 1995 Antholz-Anterselva	—	12th	—N/a	—N/a	—	9th	—N/a
(Germany) 1996 Ruhpolding	46th	29th	—N/a	—N/a	5th	8th	—N/a
(Slovakia) 1997 Brezno-Osrblie	Bronze	20th	33rd	—N/a	19th	10th	—N/a
(Slovenia) 1998 Pokljuka	—N/a	—N/a	15th	—N/a	11th	—N/a	—N/a
(Finland) 1999 Kontiolahti	12th	4th	23rd	5th	—N/a	9th	—N/a
(Norway) 2000 Oslo Holmenkollen	Silver	13th	9th	19th	—N/a	9th	—N/a
(Slovenia) 2001 Pokljuka	54th	35th	28th	—	—N/a	8th	—N/a
(Norway) 2002 Oslo Holmenkollen	—N/a	—N/a	—N/a	26th	—N/a	—N/a	—N/a
(Russia) 2003 Khanty-Mansiysk	—	48th	42nd	—	—N/a	—	—N/a
(Germany) 2004 Oberhof	28th	19th	17th	20th	—N/a	9th	—N/a
(Austria) 2005 Hochfilzen	—	—	—	25th	—N/a	—	—
(Italy) 2007 Antholz-Anterselva	—	44th	41st	—	—N/a	—	—

*During Olympic seasons competitions are only held for those events not included in the Olympic program.
**Team was removed as an event in 1998, and pursuit was added in 1997 with mass start being added in 1999 and the mixed relay in 2005.

=== Individual victories ===
6 victories (3 In, 3 Sp)

Season	Date	Location	Discipline	Level
1992–93; 1 victory (1 In)	18 March 1993	(Finland) Kontiolahti	20 km individual	Biathlon World Cup
1994–95; 1 victory (1 In)	9 March 1995	(Finland) Lahti	20 km individual	Biathlon World Cup
1995–96; 2 victories (2 Sp)	9 December 1995	(Sweden) Östersund	10 km sprint	Biathlon World Cup
1995–96; 2 victories (2 Sp)	13 January 1996	(Italy) Antholz-Anterselva	10 km sprint	Biathlon World Cup
1996–97; 2 victories (1 In, 1 Sp)	16 January 1997	(Italy) Antholz-Anterselva	20 km individual	Biathlon World Cup
1996–97; 2 victories (1 In, 1 Sp)	15 March 1997	(Russia) Novosibirsk	10 km sprint	Biathlon World Cup

*Results are from UIPMB and IBU races which include the Biathlon World Cup, Biathlon World Championships and the Winter Olympic Games.
