= Wilfried Pallhuber =

Italian biathlete (born 1967)

Personal information
- Full name: Wilfried Pallhuber
- Nickname: Willi the Kid
- Born: 4 August 1967 (age 58) Antholz-Anterselva, Italy
- Height: 1.70 m (5 ft 7 in)

Sport

Professional information
- Sport: Biathlon
- Club: C.S. Carabinieri
- World Cup debut: 17 January 1985
- Retired: 17 March 2007

Olympic Games
- Teams: 5 (1992, 1994, 1998, 2002, 2006)
- Medals: 0

World Championships
- Teams: 18 (1989, 1990, 1991, 1992, 1993, 1994, 1995, 1996, 1997, 1998, 1999, 2000, 2001, 2003, 2004, 2005, 2006, 2007)
- Medals: 6 (5 gold)

World Cup
- Seasons: 21 (1984/85, 1987/88–2006/07)
- Individual victories: 6
- Individual podiums: 7
Medal record
Men's biathlon
Representing Italy
World Championships
Gold medal – first place	1990 Kontiolahti	4 × 7.5 km relay
Gold medal – first place	1991 Lahti	Team event
Gold medal – first place	1993 Borovets	4 × 7.5 km relay
Gold medal – first place	1994 Canmore	Team event
Gold medal – first place	1997 Brezno-Osrblie	10 km sprint
Bronze medal – third place	1997 Brezno-Osrblie	4 × 7.5 km relay

Wilfried "Willi the Kid" Pallhuber (born 4 August 1967) is a former Italian biathlete. At the 2006 Winter Olympics in Turin he competed in his fifth olympics.

== Biathlon results ==
All results are sourced from the International Biathlon Union.

=== Olympic Games ===
Event	Individual	Sprint	Pursuit	Mass start	Relay
(France) 1992 Albertville	40th	—	—N/a	—N/a	—
(Norway) 1994 Lillehammer	20th	24th	—N/a	—N/a	—
(Japan) 1998 Nagano	41st	14th	—N/a	—N/a	9th
(United States) 2002 Salt Lake City	50th	50th	33rd	—N/a	16th
(Italy) 2006 Turin	9th	22nd	17th	24th	8th

*Pursuit was added as an event in 2002, with mass start being added in 2006.

=== World Championships ===
6 medals (5 gold, 1 bronze)

Event	Individual	Sprint	Pursuit	Mass start	Team	Relay	Mixed relay
(Austria) 1989 Feistritz	—	14th	—N/a	—N/a	4th	4th	—N/a
(Soviet Union) 1990 Minsk	16th	24th	—N/a	—N/a	—	Gold	—N/a
(Finland) 1991 Lahti	47th	30th	—N/a	—N/a	Gold	—	—N/a
(Russia) 1992 Novosibirsk	—N/a	—N/a	—N/a	—N/a	8th	—N/a	—N/a
(Bulgaria) 1993 Borovets	48th	—	—N/a	—N/a	8th	Gold	—N/a
(Canada) 1994 Canmore	—N/a	—N/a	—N/a	—N/a	Gold	—N/a	—N/a
(Italy) 1995 Antholz-Anterselva	79th	46th	—N/a	—N/a	10th	4th	—N/a
(Germany) 1996 Ruhpolding	41st	7th	—N/a	—N/a	—	10th	—N/a
(Slovakia) 1997 Brezno-Osrblie	41st	Gold	12th	—N/a	—	Bronze	—N/a
(Slovenia) 1998 Pokljuka	—N/a	—N/a	28th	—N/a	—	—N/a	—N/a
(Finland) 1999 Kontiolahti	21st	33rd	21st	12th	—N/a	8th	—N/a
(Norway) 2000 Oslo Holmenkollen	—	50th	51st	—	—N/a	5th	—N/a
(Slovenia) 2001 Pokljuka	31st	69th	—	—	—N/a	10th	—N/a
(Russia) 2003 Khanty-Mansiysk	78th	32nd	19th	—	—N/a	18th	—N/a
(Germany) 2004 Oberhof	26th	25th	30th	—	—N/a	15th	—N/a
(Austria) 2005 Hochfilzen	10th	25th	13th	23rd	—N/a	9th	19th
(Slovenia) 2006 Pokljuka	—N/a	—N/a	—N/a	—N/a	—N/a	—N/a	12th
(Italy) 2007 Antholz-Anterselva	46th	24th	27th	—	—N/a	4th	6th

*During Olympic seasons competitions are only held for those events not included in the Olympic program.
**Team was removed as an event in 1998, and pursuit was added in 1997 with mass start being added in 1999 and the mixed relay in 2005.

=== Individual victories ===
6 victories (4 In, 2 Sp)

Season	Date	Location	Discipline	Level
1991–92; 1 victory (1 Sp)	21 March 1992	(Russia) Novosibirsk	10 km sprint	Biathlon World Cup
1992–93; 1 victory (1 In)	4 March 1993	(Norway) Lillehammer	20 km individual	Biathlon World Cup
1993–94; 1 victory (1 In)	10 March 1994	(Canada) Hinton	20 km individual	Biathlon World Cup
1994–95; 1 victory (1 In)	19 January 1995	(Germany) Oberhof	20 km individual	Biathlon World Cup
1996–97; 2 victories (1 In, 1 Sp)	5 December 1996	(Sweden) Östersund	20 km individual	Biathlon World Cup
1996–97; 2 victories (1 In, 1 Sp)	1 February 1997	(Slovakia) Brezno-Osrblie	10 km sprint	Biathlon World Championships

*Results are from UIPMB and IBU races which include the Biathlon World Cup, Biathlon World Championships and the Winter Olympic Games.

Further notable results

- 1990: 2nd, Italian championships of biathlon, sprint
- 1991: 1st, Italian championships of biathlon, sprint
- 1994: 1st, Italian championships of biathlon, sprint
- 1995: 3rd, Italian championships of biathlon, sprint
- 1996: 3rd, Italian championships of biathlon, sprint
- 1997: 3rd, Italian championships of biathlon
- 1999:
  - 1st, Italian championships of biathlon, pursuit
  - 2nd, Italian championships of biathlon, sprint
  - 3rd, Italian championships of biathlon
- 2000:
  - 1st, Italian championships of biathlon, mass start
  - 2nd, Italian championships of biathlon
  - 2nd, Italian championships of biathlon, sprint
- 2001:
  - 1st, Italian championships of biathlon
  - 2nd, Italian championships of biathlon, sprint
  - 2nd, Italian championships of biathlon, pursuit
  - 3rd, Italian championships of biathlon, mass start
- 2002:
  - 1st, Italian championships of biathlon
  - 1st, Italian championships of biathlon, pursuit
  - 1st, Italian championships of biathlon, mass start
  - 3rd, Italian championships of biathlon, sprint
- 2003:
  - 2nd, Italian championships of biathlon, sprint
  - 2nd, Italian championships of biathlon, pursuit
- 2004:
  - 1st, Italian championships of biathlon
  - 1st, Italian championships of biathlon, sprint
  - 2nd, Italian championships of biathlon, mass start
- 2006:
  - 1st, Italian championships of biathlon, sprint
  - 1st, Italian championships of biathlon, pursuit
- 2007: 3rd, Italian championships of biathlon, mass start
