= Mikkelsplass =

Mikkelsplass is a surname. Notable people with the surname include:

- Hildegunn Mikkelsplass (born 1969), Norwegian biathlete
- Marit Mikkelsplass (born 1965), Norwegian cross-country skier
- Pål Gunnar Mikkelsplass (born 1961), Norwegian cross-country skier
