= Ilmārs Bricis =

Latvian biathlete

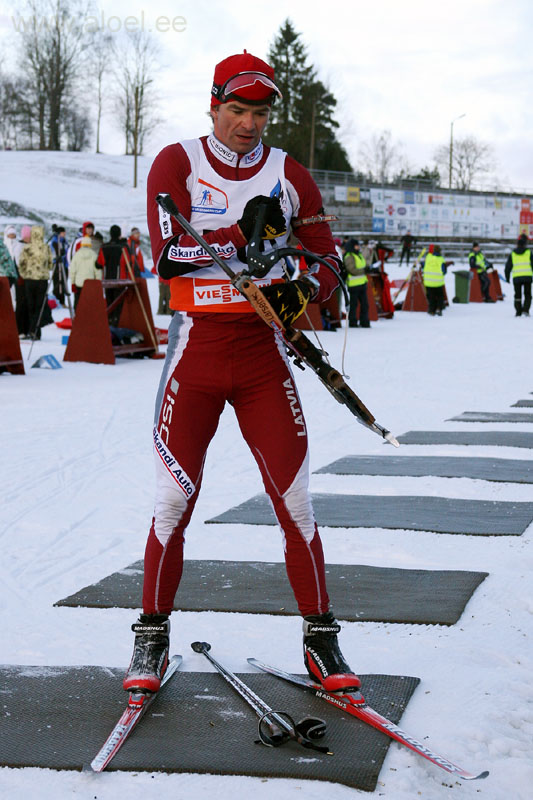
- Bricis in Otepää in 2008.

Personal information
- Full name: Ilmārs Bricis
- Born: 9 July 1970 (age 56) Rīga, Latvian SSR, Soviet Union
- Height: 1.81 m (5 ft 11 in)

Sport

Professional information
- Sport: Biathlon
- Club: CPSK

Olympic Games
- Teams: 6 (1992, 1994, 1998, 2002, 2006, 2010)
- Medals: 0

World Championships
- Teams: 17 (1993, 1995, 1996, 1997, 1998, 1999, 2000, 2001, 2002, 2003, 2004, 2005, 2007, 2008, 2009, 2011, 2017)
- Medals: 2 (0 gold)

World Cup
- Seasons: 22 (1991/92–2011/12, 2016/17–)
- Individual victories: 0
- Individual podiums: 7
Medal record
Men's biathlon
Representing Latvia
World Championships
Bronze medal – third place	2001 Pokljuka	20 km individual
Bronze medal – third place	2005 Hochfilzen	10 km sprint

Ilmārs Bricis (born 9 July 1970) is a former Latvian biathlete, who has participated in six Winter Olympics from 1992 to 2010.

He is now a biathlon coach. Bricis currently coaches Baiba Bendika and Tomas Kaukenas.

== Personal life ==
He was married to three-time Olympian Anžela Brice (cross-country skiing 1998, biathlon 2002 and 2006). Their eighteen-year-old daughter Anete Brice, coached by Anžela, competed in cross-country skiing at the 2010 Winter Olympics. After divorce with Anžela he had brief relationship with lithuanian biathlete Diana Rasimovičiūtė.

Since 2017 he is in relationship with latvian biathlete Baiba Bendika. Their son Emīls was born in 2023.

His hobbies are music and driving.

== Career ==
Bricis has won bronze medals in 20 km race at the 2001 World Championship in Pokljuka and in 10 km sprint at the 2005 World Championship in Hochfilzen.

He came 5th in the 20km and sixth in the 4 x 7.5 km Relay at the 1998 Olympics in Nagano. His best performance was fourth at the 12.5km Pursuit at the 2006 Olympics in Torino.

At the 2010 Winter Olympics in Vancouver, he and luger Anna Orlova both competed in their sixth Olympic Games. They are the first Latvians to do so, after eight-time Olympian shooter Afanasijs Kuzmins at the Summer Olympics.

Bricis is the 4th biathlete to compete at six Winter Olympics, after Austrian Alfred Eder, Briton Michael Dixon and Russian Sergei Tchepikov, with Norwegian Ole Einar Bjørndalen following in 2014.

== Biathlon results ==
All results are sourced from the International Biathlon Union.

=== Olympic Games ===
Event	Individual	Sprint	Pursuit	Mass start	Relay
(France) 1992 Albertville	61st	39th	—N/a	—N/a	16th
(Norway) 1994 Lillehammer	—	41st	—N/a	—N/a	16th
(Japan) 1998 Nagano	5th	32nd	—N/a	—N/a	6th
(United States) 2002 Salt Lake City	39th	40th	51st	—N/a	17th
(Italy) 2006 Turin	19th	12th	4th	28th	16th
(Canada) 2010 Vancouver	74th	14th	32nd	—	19th

*Pursuit was added as an event in 2002, with mass start being added in 2006.

=== World Championships ===
2 medals (2 bronze)

Event	Individual	Sprint	Pursuit	Mass start	Team	Relay	Mixed relay
(Bulgaria) 1993 Borovets	—	79th	—N/a	—N/a	19th	—	—N/a
(Italy) 1995 Antholz-Anterselva	69th	35th	—N/a	—N/a	7th	12th	—N/a
(Germany) 1996 Ruhpolding	30th	13th	—N/a	—N/a	13th	11th	—N/a
(Slovakia) 1997 Brezno-Osrblie	16th	23rd	18th	—N/a	12th	12th	—N/a
(Slovenia) 1998 Pokljuka	—N/a	—N/a	9th	—N/a	8th	—N/a	—N/a
(Finland) 1999 Kontiolahti	10th	12th	6th	15th	—N/a	5th	—N/a
(Norway) 2000 Oslo Holmenkollen	DNF	30th	31st	14th	—N/a	6th	—N/a
(Slovenia) 2001 Pokljuka	Bronze	40th	22nd	8th	—N/a	9th	—N/a
(Norway) 2002 Oslo Holmenkollen	—N/a	—N/a	—N/a	8th	—N/a	—N/a	—N/a
(Russia) 2003 Khanty-Mansiysk	18th	33rd	12th	4th	—N/a	12th	—N/a
(Germany) 2004 Oberhof	30th	45th	28th	—	—N/a	13th	—N/a
(Austria) 2005 Hochfilzen	38th	Bronze	14th	13th	—N/a	19th	—
(Italy) 2007 Antholz-Anterselva	—	DNS	—	—	—N/a	12th	17th
(Sweden) 2008 Östersund	15th	18th	13th	12th	—N/a	13th	—
(South Korea) 2009 Pyeongchang	48th	25th	38th	—	—N/a	17th	—
(Russia) 2011 Khanty-Mansiysk	58th	20th	36th	—	—N/a	14th	18th
(Austria) 2017 Hochfilzen		84th	—		—N/a		25th

*During Olympic seasons competitions are only held for those events not included in the Olympic program.
**Team was removed as an event in 1998, and pursuit was added in 1997 with mass start being added in 1999 and the mixed relay in 2005.

== See also ==
- List of athletes with the most appearances at Olympic Games
