= Patrick Favre =

Italian biathlete

Personal information
- Full name: Patrick Favre
- Born: 30 July 1972 (age 53) Aosta, Italy
- Height: 1.80 m (5 ft 11 in)

Sport

Professional information
- Sport: Biathlon
- Club: C.S. Esercito

Olympic Games
- Teams: 2 (1994, 1998)
- Medals: 0

World Championships
- Teams: 8 (1995, 1996, 1997, 1998, 1999, 2000, 2001, 2004)
- Medals: 3 (0 gold)

World Cup
- Seasons: 10 (1992/93–2000/01, 2003/04)
- Individual victories: 2
- All victories: 3
- Individual podiums: 5
- All podiums: 18
- Discipline titles: 1: 1 Individual (1994–95)
Medal record
Men's biathlon
Representing Italy
World Championships
Silver medal – second place	1999 Kontiolahti	10 km sprint
Bronze medal – third place	1996 Ruhpolding	Team event
Bronze medal – third place	1997 Brezno-Osrblie	4 × 7.5 km relay

Patrick Favre (born 30 July 1972) is a former Italian biathlete. At the Biathlon World Championships 1997 in Osrblie he won a bronze medal with the Italian relay team. Two years later at the Biathlon World Championships 1999 in Kontiolahti he won a silver medal in the sprint event. In the 1994–95 season he came second in the overall World Cup behind Jon Åge Tyldum. After the 2000–01 season, he retired as biathlete, though he had a short-lived comeback during the 2003–04 season. Following his retirement, he became a coach, spending seven years with the Italian national biathlon team before joining the French national men's biathlon team in June 2018 on a four-year contract.

== Biathlon results ==
All results are sourced from the International Biathlon Union.

=== Olympic Games ===
Event	Individual	Sprint	Relay
(Norway) 1994 Lillehammer	22nd	—	6th
(Japan) 1998 Nagano	54th	—	9th

=== World Championships ===
3 medals (1 silver, 2 bronze)

Event	Individual	Sprint	Pursuit	Mass start	Team	Relay
(Italy) 1995 Antholz-Anterselva	78th	5th	—N/a	—N/a	10th	4th
(Germany) 1996 Ruhpolding	17th	26th	—N/a	—N/a	Bronze	10th
(Slovakia) 1997 Brezno-Osrblie	15th	4th	5th	—N/a	—	Bronze
(Slovenia) 1998 Pokljuka	—N/a	—N/a	—	—N/a	6th	—N/a
(Finland) 1999 Kontiolahti	22nd	Silver	8th	19th	—N/a	8th
(Norway) 2000 Oslo Holmenkollen	47th	34th	21st	—	—N/a	—
(Slovenia) 2001 Pokljuka	13th	29th	31st	6th	—N/a	10th
(Germany) 2004 Oberhof	—	44th	46th	—	—N/a	15th

*During Olympic seasons competitions are only held for those events not included in the Olympic program.
**Team was removed as an event in 1998, and pursuit was added in 1997 with mass start being added in 1999.

=== Individual victories ===
2 victories (1 In, 1 Sp)

Season	Date	Location	Discipline	Level
1993–94; 1 victory (1 Sp)	15 January 1994	(Germany) Ruhpolding	10 km sprint	Biathlon World Cup
1994–95; 1 victory (1 In)	15 December 1994	(Austria) Bad Gastein	20 km individual	Biathlon World Cup

*Results are from UIPMB and IBU races which include the Biathlon World Cup, Biathlon World Championships and the Winter Olympic Games.

Further notable results

- 1993: 3rd, Italian championships of biathlon, sprint
- 1996: 2nd, Italian championships of biathlon
- 1998:
  - 2nd, Italian championships of biathlon
  - 2nd, Italian championships of biathlon, sprint
  - 3rd, Italian championships of biathlon, pursuit
- 1999: 1st, Italian championships of biathlon
- 2000:
  - 1st, Italian championships of biathlon
  - 1st, Italian championships of biathlon, pursuit
- 2001:
  - 1st, Italian championships of biathlon, sprint
  - 3rd, Italian championships of biathlon
  - 3rd, Italian championships of biathlon, pursuit
- 2004: 3rd, Italian championships of biathlon, pursuit
