= Biathlon World Championships 1994 =

Sports competition in Canmore, Alberta, Canada

- Host city: Canmore, Alberta
- Country: Canada
- Events: 2
- Opening: 15 March 1994
- Closing: 20 March 1994

The 29th Biathlon World Championships held in 1994 in Canmore, Alberta, Canada were only for the team events because these were not part of the Olympic programme in Lillehammer.

== Men's results ==
=== Team event ===
Date: 20 March 1994.

Position	Name	Nation	Penalties	Result
1	Pieralberto Carrara (1); Hubert Leitgeb (0); Andreas Zingerle (2); Wilfried Pallhuber (1)	ITA	(4)	26:26.5
2	Vladimir Drachev (1); Alexei Kobelev (0); Valeri Kiriyenko (1); Sergei Tarasov (2)	RUS	(4)	26:27.8
3	Steffen Hoos (0); Marco Morgenstern (1); Peter Sendel (0); Jens Steinigen (1)	GER	(2)	26:34.3
4	Sylfest Glimsdal (1); Ole Einar Bjørndalen (0); Halvard Hanevold (3); Jon Åge Tyldum (1)	NOR	(5)	27:50.9
5	Tomáš Kos (0); Ivan Masařík (0); Petr Garabík (3); Jiří Holubec (3)	CZE	(6)	28:07.3
6	Ludwig Gredler (0); Wolfgang Perner (4); Alfred Eder (2); Hannes Obererlacher (2)	AUT	(8)	28:12.1
7	Jože Poklukar (1); Matjaž Poklukar (3); Jure Velepec (1); Janez Ožbolt (1)	SLO	(6)	28:47.5
8	Xavier Blond (1); Gilles Marguet (3); Lionel Laurent (1); Stéphane Bouthiaux (1)	FRA	(6)	28:55.5
9	Oleg Ryzhenkov (0); Vadim Sashurin (0); Viktor Maigourov (1); Alexandr Popov (0)	BLR	(1)	29:04.8
10	Jason Sklenar (2); Kenneth Rudd (2); Ian Woods (1); Mike Dixon (1)	GBR	(6)	29:20.4
11	Olaf Mihelson (1); Aivo Udras (2); Urmas Kaldvee (4); Kalju Ojaste (1)	EST	(8)	29:21.5
12	Jay Poss (2); Duncan Douglas (2); Jon Engen (2); Ian Harvey (2)	USA	(8)	30:23.9
13	Glenn Rupertus (2); Ian Robertson (3); Steve Cyr (2); Kevin Quintilio (3)	CAN	(10)	30:32.2
14	Mitsuru Nishida (3); Kazumasa Takeda (2); Hirohide Sato (2); Kyōji Suga (3)	JPN	(10)	31:48.1
DNF	Stavros Christoforidis (2); Giorgos Avramakis (3); Vassilios Kiakos; Angelos Giagkou	GRE	(5)	

== Women's results ==
=== Team event ===
Medal	Name	Nation	Penalties	Result
1	Natalia Permiakova; Natalia Ryzhenkova; Irina Kokoueva; Svetlana Paramygina	BLR	…	…
2	Ann Elen Skjelbreid; Åse Idland; Annette Sikveland; Hildegunn Fossen	NOR	…	…
3	Emmanuelle Claret; Nathalie Beausire; Corinne Niogret; Véronique Claudel	FRA	…	…

== Medal table ==
Place	Nation	1st place, gold medalist(s)	2nd place, silver medalist(s)	3rd place, bronze medalist(s)	Total
1	Belarus	1	0	0	1
1	Italy	1	0	0	1
3	Norway	0	1	0	1
3	Russia	0	1	0	1
5	France	0	0	1	1
5	Germany	0	0	1	1
