= Viktor Maigourov =

Russian biathlete (born 1969)

Personal information
- Full name: Viktor Viktorovich Maigourov
- Born: 7 February 1969 (age 57) Sverdlovsk, RSFSR, Soviet Union
- Height: 1.70 m (5 ft 7 in)

Sport

Professional information
- Sport: Biathlon
- Club: Dynamo Sports Club
- Retired: 23 March 2003

Olympic Games
- Teams: 3 (1994, 1998, 2002)
- Medals: 2 (0 gold)

World Championships
- Teams: 11 (1993, 1994, 1995, 1996, 1997, 1998, 1999, 2000, 2001, 2002, 2003)
- Medals: 8 (3 gold)

World Cup
- Individual victories: 8
- Individual podiums: 22
- Discipline titles: 2: 1 Pursuit (1996–97); 1 Mass start (2001–02)
Medal record
Men's biathlon
Representing Russia
Olympic Games
Bronze medal – third place	1998 Nagano	4 × 7.5 km relay
Bronze medal – third place	2002 Salt Lake City	20 km individual
World Championships
Gold medal – first place	1996 Ruhpolding	4 × 7.5 km relay
Gold medal – first place	1997 Brezno-Osrblie	12.5 km pursuit
Gold medal – first place	2000 Lahti	4 × 7.5 km relay
Silver medal – second place	1996 Ruhpolding	10 km sprint
Silver medal – second place	1996 Ruhpolding	Team event
Silver medal – second place	1999 Kontiolahti	4 × 7.5 km relay
Silver medal – second place	2003 Khanty-Mansiysk	4 × 7.5 km relay
Bronze medal – third place	1998 Hochfilzen	Team event

Viktor Viktorovich Maigourov (Russian: Виктор Викторович Майгуров); born 7 February 1969) is a former biathlete from Russia.

== Career ==
Maigourov competed for Belarus at the Lillehammer 1994, where he placed fourth on the relay with the Belarusian team. He won eight World Cup victories, his last at Oberhof in 2001. Competing for Russia, he won two Olympic bronze medals; in the relay at the 1998 Nagano Olympics, and in the 20 km at the 2002 Salt Lake City Olympics. His best overall World Cup placing is second in 1995/1996.

Maigourov also won twice at the Holmenkollen ski festival biathlon competition in 1996 with wins in the sprint and pursuit events.

== Biathlon results ==
All results are sourced from the International Biathlon Union.

=== Olympic Games ===
2 medals (2 bronze)

Event	Individual	Sprint	Pursuit	Relay
(Norway) 1994 Lillehammer	23rd	37th	—N/a	4th
(Japan) 1998 Nagano	—	4th	—N/a	Bronze
(United States) 2002 Salt Lake City	Bronze	7th	7th	4th

*Pursuit was added as an event in 2002.

=== World Championships ===
8 medals (3 gold, 4 silver, 1 bronze)

Event	Individual	Sprint	Pursuit	Mass start	Team	Relay
(Bulgaria) 1993 Borovets	27th	—	—N/a	—N/a	—	4th
(Canada) 1994 Canmore	—N/a	—N/a	—N/a	—N/a	9th	—N/a
(Italy) 1995 Antholz-Anterselva	36th	—	—N/a	—N/a	—	—
(Germany) 1996 Ruhpolding	—	Silver	—N/a	—N/a	Silver	Gold
(Slovakia) 1997 Brezno-Osrblie	18th	12th	Gold	—N/a	15th	8th
(Slovenia) 1998 Pokljuka	—N/a	—N/a	—	—N/a	Bronze	—N/a
(Finland) 1999 Kontiolahti	41st	—	—	—	—N/a	Silver
(Norway) 2000 Oslo Holmenkollen	11th	—	—	20th	—N/a	Gold
(Slovenia) 2001 Pokljuka	5th	13th	11th	18th	—N/a	4th
(Norway) 2002 Oslo Holmenkollen	—N/a	—N/a	—N/a	10th	—N/a	—N/a
(Russia) 2003 Khanty-Mansiysk	—	9th	28th	12th	—N/a	Silver

*During Olympic seasons competitions are only held for those events not included in the Olympic program.
**Team was removed as an event in 1998, and pursuit was added in 1997 with mass start being added in 1999.

=== Individual victories ===
8 victories (1 In, 4 Sp, 3 Pu)

Season	Date	Location	Discipline	Level
1993–94; 1 victory (1 Sp)	18 December 1993	(Slovenia) Pokljuka	10 km sprint	Biathlon World Cup
1994–95; 1 victory (1 Sp)	18 March 1995	(Norway) Lillehammer	10 km sprint	Biathlon World Cup
1995–96; 1 victory (1 In)	14 March 1996	(Austria) Hochfilzen	20 km individual	Biathlon World Cup
1996–97; 4 victories (2 Sp, 2 Pu)	12 December 1996	(Norway) Oslo Holmenkollen	10 km sprint	Biathlon World Cup
1996–97; 4 victories (2 Sp, 2 Pu)	14 December 1996	(Norway) Oslo Holmenkollen	12.5 km pursuit	Biathlon World Cup
1996–97; 4 victories (2 Sp, 2 Pu)	18 January 1997	(Italy) Antholz-Anterselva	10 km sprint	Biathlon World Cup
1996–97; 4 victories (2 Sp, 2 Pu)	2 February 1997	(Slovakia) Brezno-Osrblie	12.5 km pursuit	Biathlon World Championships
2000–01; 1 victory (1 Pu)	6 January 2001	(Germany) Oberhof	12.5 km pursuit	Biathlon World Cup

*Results are from UIPMB and IBU races which include the Biathlon World Cup, Biathlon World Championships and the Winter Olympic Games.
