= Vladimir Drachev =

Russian-Belarusian biathlete (born 1966)

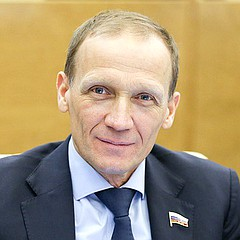
- Drachev in 2018

Personal information
- Full name: Vladimir Petrovich Drachev
- Born: 7 March 1966 (age 60) Petrozavodsk, RSFSR, Soviet Union
- Height: 1.68 m (5 ft 6 in)

Sport

Professional information
- Sport: Biathlon
- Club: Dinamo
- World Cup debut: 10 March 1988
- Retired: 26 March 2006

Olympic Games
- Teams: 3 (1994, 1998, 2006)
- Medals: 2 (0 gold)

World Championships
- Teams: 11 (1994, 1995, 1996, 1997, 1998, 1999, 2000, 2003, 2004, 2005, 2006)
- Medals: 11 (4 gold)

World Cup
- Seasons: 15 (1987/88–1988/89, 1993/94–2005/06)
- Individual victories: 15
- Individual podiums: 31
- Overall titles: 1 (1995–96)
- Discipline titles: 2: 1 Individual (1995–96); 1 Sprint (1995–96)
Medal record
Men's biathlon
Representing Belarus
World Championships
| Bronze medal – third place | 2003 Khanty-Mansiysk | 4 × 7.5 km relay |
Representing Russia
Olympic Games
| Silver medal – second place | 1994 Lillehammer | 4 × 7.5 km relay |
| Bronze medal – third place | 1998 Nagano | 4 × 7.5 km relay |
World Championships
| Gold medal – first place | 1996 Ruhpolding | 10 km sprint |
| Gold medal – first place | 1996 Ruhpolding | 4 × 7.5 km relay |
| Gold medal – first place | 1998 Pokljuka | 12.5 km pursuit |
| Gold medal – first place | 2000 Lahti | 4 × 7.5 km relay |
| Silver medal – second place | 1994 Canmore | Team event |
| Silver medal – second place | 1996 Ruhpolding | 20 km individual |
| Silver medal – second place | 1996 Ruhpolding | Team event |
| Silver medal – second place | 1999 Oslo | 15 km mass start |
| Silver medal – second place | 1999 Kontiolahti | 4 × 7.5 km relay |
| Bronze medal – third place | 1998 Hochfilzen | Team event |

Vladimir Petrovich Drachev (Russian: Владимир Петрович Драчёв, born 7 March 1966) is a former Soviet, Russian, and Belarusian biathlete. He formerly had Russian citizenship and competed for Russia until 2002. Drachev has four world championship titles in his career (two individually and two for teams). He also has two olympic relay medals for Russia (silver in 1994, and bronze in 1998). During his career he took a total of 11 World Championship medals and 15 World Cup race wins. He was also known as one of the fastest shots in the sport whilst competing.

== Biathlon results ==
All results are sourced from the International Biathlon Union.

=== Olympic Games ===
2 medals (1 silver, 1 bronze)

| Event | Individual | Sprint | Pursuit | Mass start | Relay |
|---|---|---|---|---|---|
| (Norway) 1994 Lillehammer | — | 4th | —N/a | —N/a | Silver |
| (Japan) 1998 Nagano | 35th | 12th | —N/a | —N/a | Bronze |
| (Italy) 2006 Turin | 43rd | 61st | — | — | — |

*Pursuit was added as an event in 2002, with mass start being added in 2006.

=== World Championships ===
11 medals (4 gold, 5 silver, 2 bronze)

| Event | Individual | Sprint | Pursuit | Mass start | Team | Relay | Mixed relay |
|---|---|---|---|---|---|---|---|
| (Canada) 1994 Canmore | —N/a | —N/a | —N/a | —N/a | Silver | —N/a | —N/a |
| (Italy) 1995 Antholz-Anterselva | 5th | 13th | —N/a | —N/a | — | 8th | —N/a |
| (Germany) 1996 Ruhpolding | Silver | Gold | —N/a | —N/a | Silver | Gold | —N/a |
| (Slovakia) 1997 Brezno-Osrblie | 20th | 11th | 4th | —N/a | 15th | 8th | —N/a |
| (Slovenia) 1998 Pokljuka | —N/a | —N/a | Gold | —N/a | Bronze | —N/a | —N/a |
| (Finland) 1999 Kontiolahti | 5th | 25th | 9th | Silver | —N/a | Silver | —N/a |
| (Norway) 2000 Oslo Holmenkollen | 73rd | 18th | 25th | 12th | —N/a | Gold | —N/a |
| (Russia) 2003 Khanty-Mansiysk | 38th | 5th | 6th | 20th | —N/a | Bronze | —N/a |
| (Germany) 2004 Oberhof | 12th | 43rd | DNS | 16th | —N/a | 4th | —N/a |
| (Austria) 2005 Hochfilzen | — | 45th | DNF | — | —N/a | — | — |
| (Slovenia) 2006 Pokljuka | —N/a | —N/a | —N/a | —N/a | —N/a | —N/a | 24th |

*During Olympic seasons competitions are only held for those events not included in the Olympic program.
**Team was removed as an event in 1998, and pursuit was added in 1997 with mass start being added in 1999 and the mixed relay in 2005.

=== Individual victories ===
15 victories (4 In, 8 Sp, 2 Pu, 1 MS)

| Season | Date | Location | Discipline | Level |
|---|---|---|---|---|
| 1994–95; 1 victory (1 In) | 8 December 1994 | (Austria) Bad Gastein | 20 km individual | Biathlon World Cup |
| 1995–96; 5 victories (1 In, 4 Sp) | 18 January 1996 | (Slovakia) Brezno-Osrblie | 20 km individual | Biathlon World Cup |
| 1995–96; 5 victories (1 In, 4 Sp) | 20 January 1996 | (Slovakia) Brezno-Osrblie | 10 km sprint | Biathlon World Cup |
| 1995–96; 5 victories (1 In, 4 Sp) | 9 February 1996 | (Germany) Ruhpolding | 10 km sprint | Biathlon World Championships |
| 1995–96; 5 victories (1 In, 4 Sp) | 9 March 1996 | (Slovenia) Pokljuka | 10 km sprint | Biathlon World Cup |
| 1995–96; 5 victories (1 In, 4 Sp) | 16 March 1996 | (Austria) Hochfilzen | 10 km sprint | Biathlon World Cup |
| 1997–98; 4 victories (1 In, 2 Sp, 1 Pu) | 7 March 1998 | (Slovenia) Pokljuka | 10 km sprint | Biathlon World Cup |
| 1997–98; 4 victories (1 In, 2 Sp, 1 Pu) | 8 March 1998 | (Slovenia) Pokljuka | 12.5 km pursuit | Biathlon World Championships |
| 1997–98; 4 victories (1 In, 2 Sp, 1 Pu) | 12 March 1998 | (Austria) Hochfilzen | 20 km individual | Biathlon World Cup |
| 1997–98; 4 victories (1 In, 2 Sp, 1 Pu) | 14 March 1998 | (Austria) Hochfilzen | 10 km sprint | Biathlon World Cup |
| 1998–99; 1 victory (1 Sp) | 8 January 1999 | (Germany) Oberhof | 10 km sprint | Biathlon World Cup |
| 1999–2000; 1 victory (1 MS) | 19 December 1999 | (Slovenia) Pokljuka | 15 km mass start | Biathlon World Cup |
| 2002–03; 3 victories (1 In, 1 Sp, 1 Pu) | 23 January 2003 | (Italy) Antholz-Anterselva | 20 km individual | Biathlon World Cup |
| 2002–03; 3 victories (1 In, 1 Sp, 1 Pu) | 15 February 2003 | (Norway) Oslo Holmenkollen | 10 km sprint | Biathlon World Cup |
| 2002–03; 3 victories (1 In, 1 Sp, 1 Pu) | 23 February 2003 | (Sweden) Östersund | 12.5 km pursuit | Biathlon World Cup |

*Results are from UIPMB and IBU races which include the Biathlon World Cup, Biathlon World Championships and the Winter Olympic Games.

== After retirement ==
Head of Vsevolozhsky District of Leningrad Oblast since 2014. In 2016, he was elected to the State Duma representing the United Russia party. In May 2018 Drachev was elected as President of the Russian Biathlon Union for a four-year term.
