= Jonas Eriksson (biathlete) =

Swedish biathlete (born 1970)

Personal information
- Full name: Erik Jonas Eriksson
- Born: 21 December 1970 (age 55) Karlstad, Sweden
- Height: 1.91 m (6 ft 3 in)
- Weight: 79 kg (174 lb)

Sport
- Sport: Biathlon
- Club: Skidklubben Bore, Torsby

Erik Jonas Eriksson (born 21 December 1970) is a retired Swedish biathlon competitor who finished in 10th place in the 4×7.5 km relay at the 1998 Winter Olympics.
