= Jon Åge Tyldum =

Norwegian biathlete

Personal information
- Full name: Jon Åge Tyldum
- Born: 26 October 1968 (age 57) Snåsa Municipality, Norway
- Height: 1.70 m (5 ft 7 in)

Sport

Professional information
- Sport: Biathlon
- World Cup debut: 21 January 1988

Olympic Games
- Teams: 2 (1992, 1994)
- Medals: 0

World Championships
- Teams: 7 (1991, 1992, 1993, 1994, 1995, 1996, 1997)
- Medals: 7 (1 gold)

World Cup
- Seasons: 11 (1987/88–1997/98)
- Individual victories: 2
- Individual podiums: 8
- Overall titles: 2 (1991–92, 1994–95)
- Discipline titles: 1: 1 Individual (1991–92)
Medal record
Men's biathlon
Representing Norway
World Championships
Gold medal – first place	1995 Antholz-Anterselva	Team event
Silver medal – second place	1991 Lahti	Team event
Silver medal – second place	1992 Novosibirsk	Team event
Silver medal – second place	1993 Borovets	10 km sprint
Silver medal – second place	1995 Antholz-Anterselva	20 km individual
Silver medal – second place	1997 Brezno-Osrblie	4 × 7.5 km relay
Bronze medal – third place	1991 Lahti	4 × 7.5 km relay

Jon Åge Tyldum (born 26 October 1968) is a former Norwegian biathlete. He won the overall World Cup in 1992 and 1995. At the World Championships he has won seven medals. In 1998 he retired from the sport.

== Biathlon results ==
All results are sourced from the International Biathlon Union.

=== Olympic Games ===
Event	Individual	Sprint	Relay
(France) 1992 Albertville	—	34th	—
(Norway) 1994 Lillehammer	52nd	25th	7th

=== World Championships ===
7 medals (1 gold, 5 silver, 1 bronze)

Event	Individual	Sprint	Pursuit	Team	Relay
(Finland) 1991 Lahti	16th	—	—N/a	Silver	Bronze
(Russia) 1992 Novosibirsk	—N/a	—N/a	—N/a	Silver	—N/a
(Bulgaria) 1993 Borovets	16th	Silver	—N/a	12th	9th
(Canada) 1994 Canmore	—N/a	—N/a	—N/a	4th	—N/a
(Italy) 1995 Antholz-Anterselva	Silver	11th	—N/a	Gold	5th
(Germany) 1996 Ruhpolding	14th	35th	—N/a	4th	—
(Slovakia) 1997 Brezno-Osrblie	8th	—	—	4th	Silver

*During Olympic seasons competitions are only held for those events not included in the Olympic program.
**Pursuit was added as an event in 1997.

=== Individual victories ===
2 victories (2 Sp)

Season	Date	Location	Discipline	Level
1992–93; 1 victory (1 Sp)	13 March 1993	(Sweden) Östersund	10 km sprint	Biathlon World Cup
1994–95; 1 victory (1 Sp)	10 December 1994	(Austria) Bad Gastein	10 km sprint	Biathlon World Cup

*Results are from UIPMB and IBU races which include the Biathlon World Cup, Biathlon World Championships and the Winter Olympic Games.
