= Aleksey Kobelev =

Russian biathlete

Alexei Kobelev
Personal information
- Born: 27 July 1971 (age 54) Izhevsk, Russia

Sport

Professional information
- Sport: Biathlon

Olympic Games
- Teams: 1 (1998)
- Medals: 0

World Championships
- Teams: 5 (1993, 1994, 1995, 1996, 1998)
- Medals: 4 (1 gold)

World Cup
- Seasons: 8 (1992/93–1998/99, 2000/01)
- Individual victories: 2
- All victories: 12
- Individual podiums: 4
- All podiums: 24
Medal record
Men's biathlon
Representing Russia
World Championships
Gold medal – first place	1996 Ruhpolding	4 × 7.5 km relay
Silver medal – second place	1993 Borovets	Team event
Silver medal – second place	1994 Canmore	Team event
Bronze medal – third place	1998 Hochfilzen	Team event

Aleksey Kobelev (born 27 July 1971) is a Russian biathlete. He competed in the men's sprint event at the 1998 Winter Olympics.

== Biathlon results ==
All results are sourced from the International Biathlon Union.

=== Olympic Games ===
Event	Individual	Sprint	Relay
(Japan) 1998 Nagano	—	56th	—

=== World Championships ===
4 medals (1 gold, 2 silver, 1 bronze)

Event	Individual	Sprint	Pursuit	Team	Relay
(Bulgaria) 1993 Borovets	15th	—	—N/a	Silver	—
(Canada) 1994 Canmore	—N/a	—N/a	—N/a	Silver	—N/a
(Italy) 1995 Antholz-Anterselva	—	49th	—N/a	4th	8th
(Germany) 1996 Ruhpolding	10th	5th	—N/a	—	Gold
(Austria) 1998 Hochfilzen	—N/a	—N/a	—	Bronze	—N/a

*During Olympic seasons competitions are only held for those events not included in the Olympic program.
**Pursuit was added in 1997.

=== Individual victories ===
2 victories (2 Sp)

Season	Date	Location	Discipline	Level
1994–95; 1 victory (1 Sp)	21 January 1995	(Germany) Oberhof	10 km sprint	Biathlon World Cup
1997–98; 1 victory (1 Sp)	13 December 1997	(Sweden) Ostersund	10 km sprint	Biathlon World Cup

*Results are from UIPMB and IBU races which include the Biathlon World Cup, Biathlon World Championships and the Winter Olympic Games.
