= Frank Luck =

German biathlete

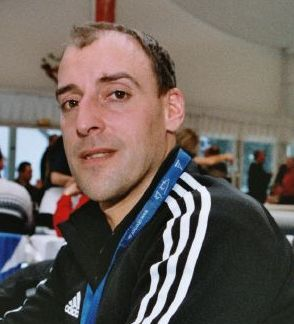
- Luck in 2005

Personal information
- Born: 5 December 1967 (age 58) Schmalkalden, East Germany
- Height: 1.79 m (5 ft 10 in)

Sport

Professional information
- Sport: Biathlon
- Club: WSV Oberhof O5
- Skis: Fischer
- World Cup debut: 18 January 1987
- Retired: 13 February 2004

Olympic Games
- Teams: 4 (1988, 1994, 1998, 2002)
- Medals: 5 (2 gold)

World Championships
- Teams: 15 (1989, 1990, 1991, 1992, 1993, 1995, 1996, 1997, 1998, 1999, 2000, 2001, 2002, 2003, 2004)
- Medals: 20 (11 gold)

World Cup
- Seasons: 18 (1986/87–2003/04)
- Individual victories: 12
- Individual podiums: 39
- Overall titles: 0
- Discipline titles: 2: 2 Individual (1999–00, 2001–02)
Medal record
Men's biathlon
Representing Germany
Olympic Games
Gold medal – first place	1994 Lillehammer	4 × 7.5 km relay
Gold medal – first place	1998 Nagano	4 × 7.5 km relay
Silver medal – second place	1994 Lillehammer	20 km individual
Silver medal – second place	2002 Salt Lake City	20 km individual
Silver medal – second place	2002 Salt Lake City	4 × 7.5 km relay
World Championships
Gold medal – first place	1991 Lahti	4 × 7.5 km relay
Gold medal – first place	1993 Borovets	Team event
Gold medal – first place	1995 Antholz-Anterselva	4 × 7.5 km relay
Gold medal – first place	1997 Brezno-Osrblie	4 × 7.5 km relay
Gold medal – first place	1999 Kontiolahti	10 km sprint
Gold medal – first place	2000 Oslo	12.5 km pursuit
Gold medal – first place	2003 Khanty-Mansiysk	4 × 7.5 km relay
Gold medal – first place	2004 Oberhof	4 × 7.5 km relay
Silver medal – second place	1991 Lahti	10 km sprint
Silver medal – second place	1996 Ruhpolding	4 × 7.5 km relay
Silver medal – second place	1997 Brezno-Osrblie	Team event
Silver medal – second place	1998 Hochfilzen	Team event
Silver medal – second place	1999 Kontiolahti	12.5 km pursuit
Bronze medal – third place	1993 Borovets	4 × 7.5 km relay
Bronze medal – third place	2000 Oslo	20 km individual
Bronze medal – third place	2000 Lahti	4 × 7.5 km relay
Representing East Germany
World Championships
Gold medal – first place	1989 Feistritz an der Drau	10 km sprint
Gold medal – first place	1989 Feistritz an der Drau	4 × 7.5 km relay
Gold medal – first place	1990 Oslo	Team event
Bronze medal – third place	1990 Kontiolahti	4 × 7.5 km relay

Frank Luck (born 5 December 1967) is a German (before 1990, East German) former biathlete. He ended his career in 2004 with a total of 12 stage wins in the worldcup.

== Career ==
Luck started early with cross-country skiing, but in 1980 he went over to biathlon. By 1988 at the age of 21 he had already qualified for the Winter Olympics in Calgary, where he finished sixth in the sprint event. His big breakthrough came with the 10 km sprint world title in 1989. Having originally competed for the East German team, by 1991, Germany had unified and Luck was now competing for the combined Germany team. Because of illness he missed the 1992 Winter Olympics in Albertville, but at the 1994 Winter Olympics in Lillehammer he won the gold medal with the German relay team which he repeated four years later at the 1998 Winter Olympics in Nagano. During his seventeen-year career, Luck won eleven world championship gold medal with the last one in the relay in 2004 at Oberhof where he retired as a biathlete after this event. With five silver and three bronze medals he is one of the most successful world championship competitors of all time.

Luck also won three times at the Holmenkollen ski festival biathlon competition with two wins in the pursuit (1999, 2000) and one win in the sprint (2002). He is the Brother-in-law to his one-time teammate Sven Fischer.

== Doping ==
In April 2009, Luck, on the German TV show Sport Inside (WDR), acknowledged having unwittingly been given the anabolic steroid Oral Turinabol by his trainer in the 1980s.

== Biathlon results ==
All results are sourced from the International Biathlon Union.

=== Olympic Games ===
5 medals (2 gold, 3 silver)

Event	Individual	Sprint	Pursuit	Relay
(Canada) 1988 Calgary	—	6th	—N/a	—
(Norway) 1994 Lillehammer	Silver	6th	—N/a	Gold
(Japan) 1998 Nagano	—	7th	—N/a	Gold
(United States) 2002 Salt Lake City	Silver	29th	11th	Silver

*Pursuit was added as an event in 2002.

=== World Championships ===
20 medals (11 gold, 5 silver, 4 bronze)

Event	Individual	Sprint	Pursuit	Mass start	Team	Relay
(Austria) 1989 Feistritz	4th	Gold	—N/a	—N/a	—	Gold
(Soviet Union) 1990 Minsk	6th	5th	—N/a	—N/a	Gold	Bronze
(Finland) 1991 Lahti	—	Silver	—N/a	—N/a	—	Gold
(Russia) 1992 Novosibirsk	—N/a	—N/a	—N/a	—N/a	7th	—N/a
(Bulgaria) 1993 Borovets	10th	—	—N/a	—N/a	Gold	Bronze
(Italy) 1995 Antholz-Anterselva	11th	7th	—N/a	—N/a	—	Gold
(Germany) 1996 Ruhpolding	8th	33rd	—N/a	—N/a	6th	Silver
(Slovakia) 1997 Brezno-Osrblie	—	7th	9th	—N/a	Silver	Gold
(Slovenia) 1998 Pokljuka	—N/a	—N/a	16th	—N/a	Silver	—N/a
(Finland) 1999 Kontiolahti	24th	Gold	Silver	20th	—N/a	4th
(Norway) 2000 Oslo Holmenkollen	Bronze	4th	Gold	17th	—N/a	Bronze
(Slovenia) 2001 Pokljuka	—	11th	17th	22nd	—N/a	12th
(Norway) 2002 Oslo Holmenkollen	—N/a	—N/a	—N/a	6th	—N/a	—N/a
(Russia) 2003 Khanty-Mansiysk	36th	30th	5th	17th	—N/a	Gold
(Germany) 2004 Oberhof	—	—	—	—	—N/a	Gold

*During Olympic seasons competitions are only held for those events not included in the Olympic program.
**Team was removed as an event in 1998, and pursuit was added in 1997 with mass start being added in 1999.

=== Individual victories ===
12 victories (1 In, 9 Sp, 2 Pu)

Season	Date	Location	Discipline	Level
1988–89; 2 victories (2 Sp)	17 December 1988	(France) Albertville	10 km sprint	Biathlon World Cup
1988–89; 2 victories (2 Sp)	11 February 1989	(Austria) Feistritz	10 km sprint	Biathlon World Championships
1990–91; 1 victory (1 Sp)	2 February 1991	(Germany) Oberhof	10 km sprint	Biathlon World Cup
1992–93; 1 victory (1 Sp)	6 March 1993	(Norway) Lillehammer	10 km sprint	Biathlon World Cup
1993–94; 1 victory (1 Sp)	22 January 1994	(Italy) Antholz-Anterselva	10 km sprint	Biathlon World Cup
1997–98; 2 victories (2 Sp)	6 December 1997	(Norway) Lillehammer	10 km sprint	Biathlon World Cup
1997–98; 2 victories (2 Sp)	5 March 1998	(Slovenia) Pokljuka	10 km sprint	Biathlon World Cup
1998–99; 2 victories (1 Sp, 1 Pu)	12 February 1999	(Finland) Kontiolahti	10 km sprint	Biathlon World Championships
1998–99; 2 victories (1 Sp, 1 Pu)	14 March 1999	(Norway) Oslo Holmenkollen	12.5 km pursuit	Biathlon World Cup
1999–2000; 1 victory (1 Pu)	20 February 2000	(Norway) Oslo Holmenkollen	12.5 km pursuit	Biathlon World Championships
2001–02; 2 victories (1 In, 1 Sp)	19 December 2001	(Slovakia) Brezno-Osrblie	20 km individual	Biathlon World Cup
2001–02; 2 victories (1 In, 1 Sp)	21 March 2002	(Norway) Oslo Holmenkollen	10 km sprint	Biathlon World Cup

*Results are from UIPMB and IBU races which include the Biathlon World Cup, Biathlon World Championships and the Winter Olympic Games.
