= Oleg Ryzhenkov =

Belarusian biathlete (born 1967)

Personal information
- Full name: Oleg Vladimirovich Ryzhenkov
- Born: 15 December 1967 (age 58) Naistenjärvi, Karelian ASSR, RSFSR, Soviet Union
- Height: 1.74 m (5 ft 9 in)

Sport

Professional information
- Sport: Biathlon
- Club: Dinamo

Olympic Games
- Teams: 4 (1994, 1998, 2002, 2006)
- Medals: 0

World Championships
- Teams: 14 (1993, 1994, 1995, 1996, 1997, 1998, 1999, 2000, 2001, 2002, 2003, 2004, 2005, 2006)
- Medals: 10 (3 gold)

World Cup
- Seasons: 14 (1992/93–2005/06)
- Individual victories: 3
- All victories: 11
- Individual podiums: 13
- All podiums: 40
Medal record
Men's biathlon
Representing Belarus
World Championships
Gold medal – first place	1996 Ruhpolding	Team event
Gold medal – first place	1997 Brezno-Osrblie	Team event
Gold medal – first place	1999 Kontiolahti	4 × 7.5 km relay
Silver medal – second place	1997 Brezno-Osrblie	20 km individual
Silver medal – second place	2001 Pokljuka	4 × 7.5 km relay
Bronze medal – third place	1995 Antholz-Anterselva	20 km individual
Bronze medal – third place	1995 Antholz-Anterselva	4 × 7.5 km relay
Bronze medal – third place	1996 Ruhpolding	4 × 7.5 km relay
Bronze medal – third place	1997 Brezno-Osrblie	10 km sprint
Bronze medal – third place	2003 Khanty-Mansiysk	4 × 7.5 km relay

Oleg Vladimirovich Ryzhenkov (Belarusian: Алег Уладзіміравіч Рыжанкоў; born 15 December 1967) is a former Belarusian biathlete.

== Biathlon results ==
All results are sourced from the International Biathlon Union.

=== Olympic Games ===
Event	Individual	Sprint	Pursuit	Mass start	Relay
(Norway) 1994 Lillehammer	—	17th	—N/a	—N/a	4th
(Japan) 1998 Nagano	9th	27th	—N/a	—N/a	4th
(United States) 2002 Salt Lake City	31st	11th	21st	—N/a	8th
(Italy) 2006 Turin	—	28th	27th	—	11th

*Pursuit was added as an event in 2002, with mass start being added in 2006.

=== World Championships ===
10 medals (3 gold, 2 silver, 5 bronze)

Event	Individual	Sprint	Pursuit	Mass start	Team	Relay	Mixed relay
(Bulgaria) 1993 Borovets	—	24th	—N/a	—N/a	—	—	—N/a
(Canada) 1994 Canmore	—N/a	—N/a	—N/a	—N/a	9th	—N/a	—N/a
(Italy) 1995 Antholz-Anterselva	Bronze	21st	—N/a	—N/a	8th	Bronze	—N/a
(Germany) 1996 Ruhpolding	50th	38th	—N/a	—N/a	Gold	Bronze	—N/a
(Slovakia) 1997 Brezno-Osrblie	Silver	Bronze	6th	—N/a	Gold	4th	—N/a
(Slovenia) 1998 Pokljuka	—N/a	—N/a	33rd	—N/a	12th	—N/a	—N/a
(Finland) 1999 Kontiolahti	11th	9th	10th	23rd	—N/a	Gold	—N/a
(Norway) 2000 Oslo Holmenkollen	17th	20th	36th	—	—N/a	4th	—N/a
(Slovenia) 2001 Pokljuka	19th	26th	33rd	19th	—N/a	Silver	—N/a
(Norway) 2002 Oslo Holmenkollen	—N/a	—N/a	—N/a	4th	—N/a	—N/a	—N/a
(Russia) 2003 Khanty-Mansiysk	29th	39th	14th	13th	—N/a	Bronze	—N/a
(Germany) 2004 Oberhof	55th	21st	26th	12th	—N/a	4th	—N/a
(Austria) 2005 Hochfilzen	12th	20th	20th	22nd	—N/a	4th	11th
(Slovenia) 2006 Pokljuka	—N/a	—N/a	—N/a	—N/a	—N/a	—N/a	24th

*During Olympic seasons competitions are only held for those events not included in the Olympic program.
**Team was removed as an event in 1998, and pursuit was added in 1997 with mass start being added in 1999 and the mixed relay in 2005.

=== Individual victories ===
3 victories (1 In, 2 Sp)

Season	Date	Location	Discipline	Level
1994–95; 2 victories (2 Sp)	28 January 1995	(Germany) Ruhpolding	10 km sprint	Biathlon World Cup
1994–95; 2 victories (2 Sp)	11 March 1995	(Finland) Lahti	10 km sprint	Biathlon World Cup
1998–99; 1 victory (1 In)	13 December 1998	(Austria) Hochfilzen	20 km individual	Biathlon World Cup

*Results are from UIPMB and IBU races which include the Biathlon World Cup, Biathlon World Championships and the Winter Olympic Games.
