= Biathlon World Championships 1999 =

Sports competition in Kontiolahti, Finland

The 34th Biathlon World Championships were held in 1999 in Kontiolahti, Finland. Due to the cold, the individual and the mass start events were moved to Oslo, Norway. The mass start was contested for the first time in the world championships.

== Medal winners ==
=== Men ===
| Event | Gold | | Silver | | Bronze | |
|---|---|---|---|---|---|---|
| 10 km sprint | Frank Luck; Germany | 28:05.6 (0+0) | Patrick Favre; Italy | 28:27.6 (0+0) | Frode Andresen; Norway | 28:46.4 (1+1) |
| 12.5 km pursuit | Ricco Groß; Germany | 35:37.8 (0+0+0+0) | Frank Luck; Germany | 36:05.0 (0+0+1+2) | Sven Fischer; Germany | 36:18.7 (1+0+1+1) |
| 20 km individual | Sven Fischer; Germany | 53:53.2 (1+0+0+0) | Ricco Groß; Germany | 54:01.9 (0+0+0+0) | Vadim Sashurin; Belarus | 54:30.5 (0+0+0+0) |
| 4 × 7.5 km relay | Belarus Alexei Aidarov; Petr Ivashko; Vadim Sashurin; Oleg Ryzhenkov | 1:23:19.3 (0+1) (0+2) (0+0) (0+3) (0+1) (0+1) (0+0) (1+3) | Russia Viktor Maigourov; Vladimir Drachev; Sergei Rozhkov; Pavel Rostovtsev | 1:23:42.4 (0+1) (0+0) (1+3) (0+1) (0+2) (1+3) (0+1) (0+0) | Norway Halvard Hanevold; Dag Bjørndalen; Frode Andresen; Ole Einar Bjørndalen | 1:23:56.3 (0+1) (0+0) (0+0) (0+0) (0+1) (1+3) (3+3) (0+2) |
| 15 km mass start | Sven Fischer; Germany | 39:39.9 (1+1+0+0) | Vladimir Drachev; Russia | 39:49.8 (0+0+1+1) | Ole Einar Bjørndalen; Norway | 39:57.3 (0+0+0+0) |

=== Women ===
| Event | Gold | | Silver | | Bronze | |
|---|---|---|---|---|---|---|
| 7.5 km sprint | Martina Zellner; Germany | 26:59.9 (0+2) | Magdalena Forsberg; Sweden | 27:04.4 (0+1) | Olena Zubrilova; Ukraine | 27:08.2 (1+2) |
| 10 km pursuit | Olena Zubrilova; Ukraine | 32:17.5 (0+1+1+0) | Martina Schwarzbacherová; Slovakia | 33:19.5 (0+1+0+0) | Martina Zellner; Germany | 33:25.1 (1+0+0+1) |
| 15 km individual | Olena Zubrilova; Ukraine | 43:28.1 (0+0+0+0) | Corinne Niogret; France | 45:32.0 (0+0+0+0) | Albina Akhatova; Russia | 46:41.7 (0+0+1+0) |
| 4 × 7.5 km relay | Germany Uschi Disl; Simone Greiner-Petter-Memm; Katrin Apel; Martina Zellner | 1:36:56.0 (0+4) (0+3) (0+1) (1+4) | Russia Nadezhda Talanova; Galina Koukleva; Olga Romasko; Albina Akhatova | 1:37:34.3 (0+3) (0+4) (0+2) (0+1) | France Delphyne Heymann-Burlet; Florence Baverel; Christelle Gros; Corinne Niogret | 1:37:42.9 (0+3) (0+3) (0+1) (0+2) |
| 12.5 km mass start | Olena Zubrilova; Ukraine | 40:08.2 (0+2+2+0) | Olena Petrova; Ukraine | 40:11.3 (0+0+1+1) | Magdalena Forsberg; Sweden | 40:16.9 (1+0+2+0) |

== Medal table ==
| Place | Nation | 1st place, gold medalist(s) | 2nd place, silver medalist(s) | 3rd place, bronze medalist(s) | Total |
|---|---|---|---|---|---|
| 1 | Germany | 6 | 2 | 2 | 10 |
| 2 | Ukraine | 3 | 1 | 1 | 5 |
| 3 | Belarus | 1 | 0 | 1 | 2 |
| 4 | Russia | 0 | 3 | 1 | 4 |
| 5 | France | 0 | 1 | 1 | 2 |
| 5 | Sweden | 0 | 1 | 1 | 2 |
| 7 | Italy | 0 | 1 | 0 | 1 |
| 7 | Slovakia | 0 | 1 | 0 | 1 |
| 9 | Norway | 0 | 0 | 3 | 3 |
