= Jaakko Niemi =

Finnish biathlete

Personal information
- Nationality: Finnish
- Born: 28 November 1961 (age 63); Valkeala, Finland

Sport
- Sport: Biathlon

Jaakko Niemi (born 28 November 1961) is a Finnish biathlete. He competed in the men's sprint event at the 1992 Winter Olympics.
