= Hildegunn Mikkelsplass =

Norwegian biathlete (born 1969)

Medal record

Women's biathlon

Representing Norway

World Championships
Silver medal – second place	1994 Canmore	team event
Silver medal – second place	1998 Hochfilzen	team event
Bronze medal – third place	1991 Lahti	team event
Bronze medal – third place	1995 Antholz-Anterselva	4 x 7.5 km relay

Hildegunn Mikkelsplass (née Fossen on April 16, 1969 in Drammen) is a former Norwegian biathlete. She is married to the former cross-country skier Eilif Kristen Mikkelsplass.

== Individual victories ==
2 victories (2 Sp)

Season	Date	Location	Discipline	Level
1991–92; 1 victory (1 Sp)	8 March 1992	(Norway) Oslo Holmenkollen	7.5 km sprint	Biathlon World Cup
1994–95; 1 victory (1 Sp)	10 December 1994	(Austria) Bad Gastein	7.5 km sprint	Biathlon World Cup

*Results are from UIPMB and IBU races which include the Biathlon World Cup, Biathlon World Championships and the Winter Olympic Games.
