= Biathlon World Championships 1996 =

Sports competition in Ruhpolding, Germany

- Host city: Ruhpolding, Bavaria
- Country: Germany
- Events: 8
- Opening: 3 February 1996
- Closing: 11 February 1996

The 31st Biathlon World Championships were held in 1996 for the third time in Ruhpolding, Germany.

== Men's results ==
=== 20 km individual ===
Medal	Name	Nation	Penalties	Result
1st place, gold medalist(s)	Sergei Tarasov	RUS		53:05.4
2nd place, silver medalist(s)	Vladimir Drachev	RUS		53:49.9
3rd place, bronze medalist(s)	Vadim Sashurin	BLR		54:38.3

=== 10 km sprint ===
Medal	Name	Nation	Penalties	Result
1st place, gold medalist(s)	Vladimir Drachev	RUS		26:52.3
2nd place, silver medalist(s)	Viktor Maigourov	RUS		
3rd place, bronze medalist(s)	René Cattarinussi	ITA		

=== Team event ===
Medal	Name	Nation	Penalties	Result
1st place, gold medalist(s)	Belarus Vadim Sashurin; Oleg Ryzhenkov; Alexandr Popov; Petr Ivashko	BLR		26:05.6
2nd place, silver medalist(s)	Russia Viktor Maigourov; Vladimir Drachev; Pavel Mouslimov; Sergei Rozhkov	RUS		
3rd place, bronze medalist(s)	Italy René Cattarinussi; Pieralberto Carrara; Patrick Favre; Hubert Leitgeb	ITA		

=== 4 × 7.5 km relay ===
Medal	Name	Nation	Penalties	Result
1st place, gold medalist(s)	Russia Viktor Maigourov; Vladimir Drachev; Sergei Tarasov; Alexei Kobelev	RUS		1:19:50.8
2nd place, silver medalist(s)	Germany Ricco Groß; Peter Sendel; Frank Luck; Sven Fischer	GER		
3rd place, bronze medalist(s)	Belarus Alexei Aidarov; Oleg Ryzhenkov; Vadim Sashurin; Alexandr Popov	BLR		

== Women's results ==
=== 15 km individual ===
Medal	Name	Nation	Penalties	Result
1st place, gold medalist(s)	Emmanuelle Claret	FRA		46:43.1
2nd place, silver medalist(s)	Olga Melnik	RUS		
3rd place, bronze medalist(s)	Olena Petrova	UKR		

=== 7.5 km sprint ===
Medal	Name	Nation	Penalties	Result
1st place, gold medalist(s)	Olga Romasko	RUS		22:30.5
2nd place, silver medalist(s)	Ann-Elen Skjelbreid	NOR		
3rd place, bronze medalist(s)	Magdalena Forsberg	SWE		

=== Team event ===
Medal	Name	Nation	Penalties	Result
1st place, gold medalist(s)	Germany Katrin Apel; Petra Behle; Uschi Disl; Simone Greiner-Petter-Memm	GER		23:23.6
2nd place, silver medalist(s)	Ukraine Tetyana Vodopyanova; Olena Petrova; Olena Zubrilova; Nina Lemesh	UKR		
3rd place, bronze medalist(s)	France Anne Briand; Corinne Niogret; Florence Baverel-Robert; Emmanuelle Claret	FRA		

=== 4 × 7.5 km relay ===
Medal	Name	Nation	Penalties	Result
1st place, gold medalist(s)	Germany Uschi Disl; Simone Greiner-Petter-Memm; Katrin Apel; Petra Behle	GER		1:33:59.8
2nd place, silver medalist(s)	France Corinne Niogret; Florence Baverel-Robert; Emmanuelle Claret; Anne Briand	FRA		
3rd place, bronze medalist(s)	Ukraine Tetyana Vodopyanova; Olena Petrova; Olena Zubrilova; Valentina Tserbe-Nessina	UKR		

== Medal table ==
Place	Nation	1st place, gold medalist(s)	2nd place, silver medalist(s)	3rd place, bronze medalist(s)	Total
1	Russia	4	4	0	8
2	Germany	2	1	0	3
3	France	1	1	1	3
4	Belarus	1	0	2	3
5	Ukraine	0	1	2	3
6	Norway	0	1	0	1
7	Italy	0	0	2	2
8	Sweden	0	0	1	1
