= Biathlon World Championships 2001 =

Sports competition in Pokljuka, Slovenia

- Host city: Pokljuka
- Country: Slovenia
- Events: 8
- Opening: 3 February 2001
- Closing: 11 February 2001

The 36th Biathlon World Championships were held in 2001 for the second time in Pokljuka, Slovenia.

== Men's results ==
=== 20 km individual ===
Medal	Name	Nation	Penalties	Result
1st place, gold medalist(s)	Paavo Puurunen	FIN		
2nd place, silver medalist(s)	Vadim Sashurin	BLR		
3rd place, bronze medalist(s)	Ilmārs Bricis	LAT		

=== 10 km sprint ===
Medal	Name	Nation	Penalties	Result
1st place, gold medalist(s)	Pavel Rostovtsev	RUS		
2nd place, silver medalist(s)	René Cattarinussi	ITA		
3rd place, bronze medalist(s)	Halvard Hanevold	NOR		

=== 12.5 km pursuit ===
Medal	Name	Nation	Penalties	Result
1st place, gold medalist(s)	Pavel Rostovtsev	RUS		
2nd place, silver medalist(s)	Raphaël Poirée	FRA		
3rd place, bronze medalist(s)	Sven Fischer	GER		

=== 15 km mass start ===
Medal	Name	Nation	Penalties	Result
1st place, gold medalist(s)	Raphaël Poirée	FRA		
2nd place, silver medalist(s)	Ole Einar Bjørndalen	NOR		
3rd place, bronze medalist(s)	Sven Fischer	GER		

=== 4 × 7.5 km relay ===
Medal	Name	Nation	Penalties	Result
1st place, gold medalist(s)	France Gilles Marguet; Vincent Defrasne; Julien Robert; Raphaël Poirée	FRA		
2nd place, silver medalist(s)	Belarus Alexei Aidarov; Alexander Syman; Oleg Ryzhenkov; Vadim Sashurin	BLR		
3rd place, bronze medalist(s)	Norway Egil Gjelland; Frode Andresen; Halvard Hanevold; Ole Einar Bjørndalen	NOR		

== Women's results ==
=== 15 km individual ===
Medal	Name	Nation	Penalties	Result
1st place, gold medalist(s)	Magdalena Forsberg	SWE		
2nd place, silver medalist(s)	Liv Grete Poirée	NOR		
3rd place, bronze medalist(s)	Olena Zubrilova	UKR		

=== 7.5 km sprint ===
Medal	Name	Nation	Penalties	Result
1st place, gold medalist(s)	Kati Wilhelm	GER		
2nd place, silver medalist(s)	Uschi Disl	GER		
3rd place, bronze medalist(s)	Liv Grete Poirée	NOR		

=== 10 km pursuit ===
Medal	Name	Nation	Penalties	Result
1st place, gold medalist(s)	Liv Grete Poirée	NOR		
2nd place, silver medalist(s)	Corinne Niogret	FRA		
3rd place, bronze medalist(s)	Magdalena Forsberg	SWE		

=== 12.5 km mass start ===
Medal	Name	Nation	Penalties	Result
1st place, gold medalist(s)	Magdalena Forsberg	SWE		
2nd place, silver medalist(s)	Martina Glagow	GER		
3rd place, bronze medalist(s)	Liv Grete Poirée	NOR		

=== 4 × 7.5 km relay ===
Medal	Name	Nation	Penalties	Result
1st place, gold medalist(s)	Russia Olga Pyleva; Anna Bogaliy; Galina Kukleva; Svetlana Ishmuratova	RUS		
2nd place, silver medalist(s)	Germany Uschi Disl; Katrin Apel; Andrea Henkel; Kati Wilhelm	GER		
3rd place, bronze medalist(s)	Ukraine Olena Zubrilova; Olena Petrova; Nina Lemesh; Tetyana Vodopyanova	UKR		

== Medal table ==
Place	Nation	1st place, gold medalist(s)	2nd place, silver medalist(s)	3rd place, bronze medalist(s)	Total
1	Russia	3	0	0	3
2	France	2	2	0	4
3	Sweden	2	0	1	3
4	Germany	1	3	2	6
5	Norway	1	2	4	7
6	Finland	1	0	0	1
7	Belarus	0	2	0	2
8	Italy	0	1	0	1
9	Ukraine	0	0	2	2
10	Latvia	0	0	1	1
