= Biathlon World Championships 1998 =

Sports competition in Pokljuka, Slovenia

The 33rd Biathlon World Championships held in March 1998 in Pokljuka, Slovenia, and for the second time in Hochfilzen, Austria were only for the pursuit races (Pokljuka) and the team events (Hochfilzen) because these were not part of the Olympic programme in Nagano.

== Men's results ==
=== 12.5 km pursuit ===
Medal	Name	Nation	Penalties	Result
1st place, gold medalist(s)	Vladimir Drachev	RUS		36:30.3
2nd place, silver medalist(s)	Ole Einar Bjørndalen	NOR		+ 14.0
3rd place, bronze medalist(s)	Raphaël Poirée	FRA		+ 41.6

=== Team event ===
Medal	Name	Nation	Penalties	Result
1st place, gold medalist(s)	Norway Egil Gjelland; Sylfest Glimsdal; Halvard Hanevold; Ole Einar Bjørndalen	NOR		29:17.6
2nd place, silver medalist(s)	Germany Ricco Groß; Carsten Heymann; Sven Fischer; Frank Luck	GER		+ 43.7
3rd place, bronze medalist(s)	Russia Vladimir Drachev; Alexei Kobelev; Sergei Rozhkov; Viktor Maigourov	RUS		+ 56.4

== Women's results ==
=== 10 km pursuit ===
Medal	Name	Nation	Penalties	Result
1st place, gold medalist(s)	Magdalena Forsberg	SWE		37:58.6
2nd place, silver medalist(s)	Corinne Niogret	FRA		+ 1:06.9
3rd place, bronze medalist(s)	Martina Zellner	GER		+ 1:25.8

=== Team event ===
Medal	Name	Nation	Penalties	Result
1st place, gold medalist(s)	Russia Anna Volkova; Olga Romasko; Svetlana Ishmouratova; Albina Akhatova	RUS		30:21.1
2nd place, silver medalist(s)	Norway Hildegunn Mikkelsplass; Ann Elen Skjelbreid; Annette Sikveland; Liv Grete Skjelbreid	NOR		+ 17.6
3rd place, bronze medalist(s)	Finland Katja Holanti; Tiina Mikkola; Mari Lampinen; Sanna-Leena Perunka	FIN		+ 39.1

== Medal table ==
Place	Nation	1st place, gold medalist(s)	2nd place, silver medalist(s)	3rd place, bronze medalist(s)	Total
1	Russia	2	0	1	3
2	Norway	1	2	0	3
3	Sweden	1	0	0	1
4	France	0	1	1	2
4	Germany	0	1	1	2
6	Finland	0	0	1	1
