= 1996–97 Biathlon World Cup =

Biathlon competition

1996–97 World Cup
Discipline	Men	Women
Overall	(Germany) Sven Fischer	(Sweden) Magdalena Forsberg
Nations Cup	Germany	Germany
Individual	(Germany) Ricco Groß	(Germany) Uschi Disl
Sprint	(Norway) Ole Einar Bjørndalen	(Germany) Uschi Disl
Pursuit	(Russia) Viktor Maigourov	(Sweden) Magdalena Forsberg
Relay	Germany	Russia

Competition

The 1996–97 Biathlon World Cup was a multi-race tournament over a season of biathlon, organised by the International Biathlon Union. The season started on 30 November 1996 in Lillehammer, Norway, and ended on 16 March 1997 in Novosibirsk, Russia. It was the 20th season of the Biathlon World Cup.

== Calendar ==
Below is the IBU World Cup calendar for the 1996–97 season.

Location	Date	Individual	Sprint	Pursuit	Mass start	Relay
(Norway) Lillehammer	30 November–1 December		●	●		
(Sweden) Östersund	5–8 December	●	●			●
(Norway) Holmenkollen	12–15 December		●	●		●
(Germany) Oberhof	4–5 January		●	●		
(Germany) Ruhpolding	9–12 January	●	●			
(Italy) Antholz	16–19 January	●	●			●
(Slovakia) Osrblie	1–17 February	●	●	●		●
(Japan) Nagano	6–9 March	●	●			●
(Russia) Novosibirsk	13–16 March	●	●		●	
Total		6	9	4	1	5

== World Cup Podium ==
=== Men ===
Stage	Date	Place	Discipline	Winner	Second	Third	Yellow bib (After competition)	Det.
1	30 November 1996	(Norway) Lillehammer	10 km Sprint	(Germany) Sven Fischer	(Russia) Sergei Tarasov	(Russia) Pavel Rostovtsev	(Germany) Sven Fischer	Detail
1	1 December 1996	(Norway) Lillehammer	12.5 km Pursuit	(Germany) Sven Fischer	(Russia) Pavel Rostovtsev	(Italy) René Cattarinussi	(Germany) Sven Fischer	Detail
2	5 December 1996	(Sweden) Östersund	20 km Individual	(Italy) Wilfried Pallhuber	(Finland) Vesa Hietalahti	(Russia) Pavel Mouslimov	(Russia) Pavel Mouslimov	Detail
2	7 December 1996	(Sweden) Östersund	10 km Sprint	(Belarus) Vadim Sashurin	(Norway) Frode Andresen	(Norway) Ole Einar Bjørndalen	(Russia) Pavel Mouslimov	Detail
3	12 December 1996	(Norway) Oslo Holmenkollen	10 km Sprint	(Russia) Viktor Maigourov	(Norway) Frode Andresen	(Germany) Sven Fischer	(Germany) Sven Fischer	Detail
3	14 December 1996	(Norway) Oslo Holmenkollen	12.5 km Pursuit	(Russia) Viktor Maigourov	(Germany) Sven Fischer	(Norway) Ole Einar Bjørndalen	(Germany) Sven Fischer	Detail
4	4 January 1997	(Germany) Oberhof	10 km Sprint	(Norway) Ole Einar Bjørndalen	(Russia) Pavel Mouslimov	(Norway) Halvard Hanevold	(Germany) Sven Fischer	Detail
4	5 January 1997	(Germany) Oberhof	12.5 km Pursuit	(Norway) Ole Einar Bjørndalen	(Russia) Viktor Maigourov	(Austria) Ludwig Gredler	(Germany) Sven Fischer	Detail
5	9 January 1997	(Germany) Ruhpolding	20 km Individual	(Germany) Ricco Groß	(Norway) Ole Einar Bjørndalen	(Russia) Viktor Maigourov	(Germany) Sven Fischer	Detail
5	11 January 1997	(Germany) Ruhpolding	10 km Sprint	(Norway) Ole Einar Bjørndalen	(Russia) Pavel Rostovtsev	(Germany) Sven Fischer	(Germany) Sven Fischer	Detail
6	16 January 1997	(Italy) Antholz-Anterselva	20 km Individual	(Austria) Ludwig Gredler	(Germany) Ricco Groß	(Russia) Sergei Rozhkov	(Germany) Sven Fischer	Detail
6	18 January 1997	(Italy) Antholz-Anterselva	10 km Sprint	(Russia) Viktor Maigourov	(Italy) Pieralberto Carrara	(France) Raphaël Poirée	(Germany) Sven Fischer	Detail
WC	1 February 1997	(Slovakia) Brezno-Osrblie	10 km Sprint	(Italy) Wilfried Pallhuber	(Italy) René Cattarinussi	(Belarus) Oleg Ryzhenkov	(Norway) Ole Einar Bjørndalen	Detail
WC	2 February 1997	(Slovakia) Brezno-Osrblie	12.5 km Pursuit	(Russia) Viktor Maigourov	(Russia) Sergei Tarasov	(Norway) Ole Einar Bjørndalen	(Norway) Ole Einar Bjørndalen	Detail
WC	7 February 1997	(Slovakia) Brezno-Osrblie	20 km Individual	(Germany) Ricco Groß	(Belarus) Oleg Ryzhenkov	(Austria) Ludwig Gredler	(Norway) Ole Einar Bjørndalen	Detail
7	6 March 1997	(Japan) Nagano	20 km Individual	(Germany) Mark Kirchner	(Finland) Vesa Hietalahti	(Belarus) Oleg Ryzhenkov	(Norway) Ole Einar Bjørndalen	Detail
7	8 March 1997	(Japan) Nagano	10 km Sprint	(Germany) Sven Fischer	(Norway) Ole Einar Bjørndalen	(Italy) René Cattarinussi	(Norway) Ole Einar Bjørndalen	Detail
8	13 March 1997	(Russia) Novosibirsk	20 km Individual	(Russia) Pavel Mouslimov	(Germany) Ricco Groß	(Germany) Sven Fischer	(Germany) Sven Fischer	Detail
8	15 March 1997	(Russia) Novosibirsk	10 km Sprint	(Austria) Ludwig Gredler	(Germany) Ricco Groß	(Russia) Sergei Tarasov	(Germany) Sven Fischer	Detail

=== Women ===
Stage	Date	Place	Discipline	Winner	Second	Third	Yellow bib (After competition)	Det.
1	30 November 1996	(Norway) Lillehammer	7.5 km Sprint	(Germany) Petra Behle	(Germany) Simone Greiner-Petter-M.	(Russia) Olga Melnik	(Germany) Petra Behle	Detail
1	1 December 1996	(Norway) Lillehammer	10 km Pursuit	(Germany) Simone Greiner-Petter-M.	(Russia) Galina Koukleva	(Sweden) Magdalena Forsberg	(Germany) Simone Greiner-Petter-M.	Detail
2	5 December 1996	(Sweden) Östersund	15 km Individual	(Russia) Anna Volkova	(China) Yu Shumei	(Belarus) Svetlana Paramygina	(Germany) Petra Behle	Detail
2	7 December 1996	(Sweden) Östersund	7.5 km Sprint	(Russia) Olga Melnik	(Belarus) Svetlana Paramygina	(Norway) Gunn Margit Andreassen	(Germany) Petra Behle	Detail
3	12 December 1996	(Norway) Oslo Holmenkollen	7.5 km Sprint	(Germany) Uschi Disl	(Germany) Simone Greiner-Petter-M.	(Russia) Galina Koukleva	(Germany) Petra Behle	Detail
3	14 December 1996	(Norway) Oslo Holmenkollen	10 km Pursuit	(Germany) Uschi Disl	(Russia) Galina Koukleva	(Russia) Olga Romasko	(Sweden) Magdalena Forsberg	Detail
4	4 January 1997	(Germany) Oberhof	7.5 km Sprint	(Sweden) Magdalena Forsberg	(Norway) Hildegunn Mikkelsplass	(Germany) Kathi Schwaab	(Sweden) Magdalena Forsberg	Detail
4	5 January 1997	(Germany) Oberhof	10 km Pursuit	(Sweden) Magdalena Forsberg	(Germany) Simone Greiner-Petter-M.	(Norway) Annette Sikveland	(Sweden) Magdalena Forsberg	Detail
5	9 January 1997	(Germany) Ruhpolding	15 km Individual	(Norway) Annette Sikveland	(Germany) Simone Greiner-Petter-M.	(France) Corinne Niogret	(Sweden) Magdalena Forsberg	Detail
5	11 January 1997	(Germany) Ruhpolding	7.5 km Sprint	(Germany) Petra Behle	(Germany) Uschi Disl	(Russia) Olga Romasko	(Sweden) Magdalena Forsberg	Detail
6	16 January 1997	(Italy) Antholz-Anterselva	15 km Individual	(Ukraine) Tetyana Vodopyanova	(Norway) Annette Sikveland	(Germany) Uschi Disl	(Sweden) Magdalena Forsberg	Detail
6	18 January 1997	(Italy) Antholz-Anterselva	7.5 km Sprint	(Germany) Uschi Disl	(Norway) Ann-Elen Skjelbreid	(France) Corinne Niogret	(Sweden) Magdalena Forsberg	Detail
WC	1 February 1997	(Slovakia) Brezno-Osrblie	7.5 km Sprint	(Russia) Olga Romasko	(Ukraine) Olena Zubrilova	(Sweden) Magdalena Forsberg	(Sweden) Magdalena Forsberg	Detail
WC	2 February 1997	(Slovakia) Brezno-Osrblie	10 km Pursuit	(Sweden) Magdalena Forsberg	(Ukraine) Olena Zubrilova	(Russia) Olga Romasko	(Sweden) Magdalena Forsberg	Detail
WC	6 February 1997	(Slovakia) Brezno-Osrblie	15 km Individual	(Sweden) Magdalena Forsberg	(Ukraine) Olena Zubrilova	(Bulgaria) Ekaterina Dafovska	(Sweden) Magdalena Forsberg	Detail
7	6 March 1997	(Japan) Nagano	15 km Individual	(Slovenia) Andreja Grašič	(Germany) Uschi Disl	(Poland) Anna Stera	(Sweden) Magdalena Forsberg	Detail
7	8 March 1997	(Japan) Nagano	7.5 km Sprint	(Russia) Olga Romasko	(Germany) Uschi Disl	(Bulgaria) Ekaterina Dafovska	(Sweden) Magdalena Forsberg	Detail
8	13 March 1997	(Russia) Novosibirsk	15 km Individual	(Belarus) Svetlana Paramygina	(Germany) Uschi Disl	(Russia) Anna Volkova	(Sweden) Magdalena Forsberg	Detail
8	15 March 1997	(Russia) Novosibirsk	7.5 km Sprint	(Germany) Petra Behle	(Slovenia) Andreja Grašič	(Belarus) Svetlana Paramygina	(Sweden) Magdalena Forsberg	Detail

=== Men's team ===
Event	Date	Place	Discipline	Winner	Second	Third
2	8 December 1996	(Sweden) Östersund	4x7.5 km Relay	Germany Ricco Gross; Peter Sendel; Frank Luck; Sven Fischer	Norway Egil Gjelland; Halvard Hanevold; Frode Andresen; Ole Einar Bjørndalen	Belarus Alexei Aidarov; Oleg Ryzhenkov; Alexander Popov; Vadim Sashurin
3	15 December 1996	(Norway) Holmenkollen	4x7.5 km Relay	Germany Ricco Gross; Peter Sendel; Mark Kirchner; Frank Luck	Norway Ole Einar Bjørndalen; Egil Gjelland; Dag Bjørndalen; Frode Andresen	Russia Sergei Rozhkov; Pavel Mouslimov; Pavel Rostovtsev; Alexei Kobelev
5	12 January 1997	(Germany) Ruhpolding	Team event	Austria Hannes Obererlacher; Reinhard Neuner; Wolfgang Perner; Ludwig Gredler	Norway Halvard Hanevold; Egil Gjelland; Jon Age Tyldum; Dag Bjørndalen	Russia Sergei Tarasov; Eduard Ryabov; Pavel Mouslimov; Sergei Rozhkov
6	19 January 1997	(Italy) Antholz-Anterselva	4x7.5 km Relay	Germany Ricco Gross; Mark Kirchner; Carsten Heymann; Frank Luck	Italy Rene Cattarinussi; Wilfried Pallhuber; Patrick Favre; Pieralberto Carrara	Norway Bard Mjolne; Sylfest Glimsdal; Jon Age Tyldum; Ole Einar Bjørndalen
WC	5 February 1997	(Slovakia) Osrblie	Team event	Belarus Oleg Ryzhenkov; Petr Ivashko; Alexander Popov; Vadim Sashurin	Germany Carsten Heymann; Mark Kirchner; Frank Luck; Peter Sendel	Poland Wieslaw Ziemianin; Jan Ziemianin; Wojciech Kozub; Tomasz Sikora
WC	9 February 1997	(Slovakia) Osrblie	4x7.5 km Relay	Germany Ricco Gross; Peter Sendel; Sven Fischer; Frank Luck	Norway Egil Gjelland; Jon Age Tyldum; Dag Bjørndalen; Ole Einar Bjørndalen	Italy Rene Cattarinussi; Wilfried Pallhuber; Patrick Favre; Pieralberto Carrara
7	9 March 1997	(Japan) Nagano	4x7.5 km Relay	Russia Viktor Maigourov; Vladimir Drachev; Sergei Tarasov; Alexei Kobelev	Norway Frode Andresen; Jon Age Tyldum; Halvard Hanevold; Ole Einar Bjørndalen	Slovenia Jože Poklukar; Tomaž Žemva; Janez Ožbolt; Matjaž Poklukar

=== Women's team ===
Event	Date	Place	Discipline	Winner	Second	Third
2	8 December 1996	(Sweden) Östersund	4x7.5 km Relay	Russia Olga Melnik; Galina Kukleva; Anna Volkova; Olga Romasko	Germany Uschi Disl; Simone Greiner; Katrin Apel; Petra Behle	Norway Ann-Elen Skjelbreid; Annette Sikveland; Hildegunn Mikkelsplass; Gunn Margit Andreassen
3	15 December 1996	(Norway) Holmenkollen	4x7.5 km Relay	Russia Olga Melnik; Galina Kukleva; Nadezhda Talanova; Olga Romasko	Germany Uschi Disl; Simone Greiner; Katrin Apel; Petra Behle	Norway Ann-Elen Skjelbreid; Annette Sikveland; Hildegunn Mikkelsplass; Gunn Margit Andreassen
6	19 January 1997	(Italy) Antholz-Anterselva	4x7.5 km Relay	Russia Olga Melnik; Galina Kukleva; Nadezhda Talanova; Olga Romasko	Norway Ann-Elen Skjelbreid; Annette Sikveland; Liv Grete Skjelbreid; Gunn Margit Andreassen	France Delphyne Burlet; Christelle Gros; Veronique Claudel; Corinne Niogret
WC	9 February 1997	(Slovakia) Osrblie	4x7.5 km Relay	Germany Uschi Disl; Simone Greiner; Katrin Apel; Petra Behle	Norway Ann-Elen Skjelbreid; Annette Sikveland; Liv Grete Skjelbreid; Gunn Margit Andreassen	Russia Olga Melnik; Galina Kukleva; Nadezhda Talanova; Olga Romasko
7	9 March 1997	(Japan) Nagano	4x7.5 km Relay	Ukraine Nina Lemesh; Olena Petrova; Valentina Tserbe-Nessina; Tetyana Vodopyanova	Russia Nadezhda Talanova; Olga Melnik; Anna Volkova; Olga Romasko	China Yu Shumei; Sun Ribo; Liu Jinfeng; Liu Xianying

== Standings: Men ==
=== Overall ===
Pos.		Points
1.	(Germany) Sven Fischer	314
2.	(Norway) Ole Einar Bjørndalen	303
3.	(Russia) Viktor Maigourov	294
4.	(Germany) Ricco Groß	281
5.	(Russia) Pavel Mouslimov	255

- Final standings after 19 races.

=== Individual ===
Pos.		Points
1.	(Germany) Ricco Groß	134
2.	(Russia) Pavel Mouslimov	101
3.	(Germany) Mark Kirchner	82
4.	(Germany) Carsten Heymann	82
5.	(Germany) Sven Fischer	79

- Final standings after 6 races.

=== Sprint ===
Pos.		Points
1.	(Norway) Ole Einar Bjørndalen	158
2.	(Germany) Sven Fischer	157
3.	(Russia) Viktor Maigourov	136
4.	(Austria) Ludwig Gredler	127
5.	(Norway) Frode Andresen	124

- Final standings after 9 races.

=== Pursuit ===
Pos.		Points
1.	(Russia) Viktor Maigourov	86
2.	(Germany) Sven Fischer	78
2.	(Norway) Ole Einar Bjørndalen	78
4.	(Italy) René Cattarinussi	60
5.	(Russia) Pavel Rostovtsev	50

- Final standings after 4 races.

=== Relay ===
Pos.		Points
1.	Germany	120
2.	Norway	104
3.	Russia	95
4.	Belarus	90
5.	Italy	88

- Final standings after 5 races.

=== Nation ===
Pos.		Points
1.	Germany	5225
2.	Russia	5098
3.	Norway	4883
4.	Italy	4857
5.	Belarus	4542

- Final standings after 20 races.

== Standings: Women ==
=== Overall ===
Pos.		Points
1.	(Sweden) Magdalena Forsberg	340
2.	(Germany) Uschi Disl	333
3.	(Germany) Simone Greiner-Petter-M.	283
4.	(Russia) Olga Romasko	240
5.	(France) Corinne Niogret	240

- Final standings after 19 races.

=== Individual ===
Pos.		Points
1.	(Germany) Uschi Disl	110
2.	(Sweden) Magdalena Forsberg	106
3.	(Belarus) Svetlana Paramygina	86
4.	(Norway) Annette Sikveland	85
5.	(France) Corinne Niogret	84

- Final standings after 6 races.

=== Sprint ===
Pos.		Points
1.	(Germany) Uschi Disl	164
2.	(Germany) Simone Greiner-Petter-M.	156
3.	(Sweden) Magdalena Forsberg	150
4.	(Russia) Olga Romasko	140
5.	(Germany) Petra Behle	135

- Final standings after 9 races.

=== Pursuit ===
Pos.		Points
1.	(Sweden) Magdalena Forsberg	84
2.	(Germany) Simone Greiner-Petter-M.	75
3.	(Russia) Olga Romasko	70
4.	(Russia) Galina Kukleva	64
5.	(Germany) Uschi Disl	59

- Final standings after 4 races.

=== Relay ===
Pos.		Points
1.	Russia	116
2.	Germany	103
3.	Norway	100
4.	Ukraine	90
5.	France	89

- Final standings after 5 races.

=== Nation ===
Pos.		Points
1.	Germany	5176
2.	Russia	4955
3.	Norway	4902
4.	Italy	4791
5.	Ukraine	4526

- Final standings after 20 races.

== Medal table ==
Rank	Nation	Gold	Silver	Bronze	Total
1	Germany	18	14	5	37
2	Russia	13	9	13	35
3	Norway	4	13	9	26
4	Sweden	4	0	2	6
5	Italy	2	3	3	8
6	Ukraine	2	3	0	5
7	Belarus	2	2	5	9
8	Austria	2	0	2	4
9	Slovenia	1	1	1	3
10	Finland	0	2	0	2
11	China	0	1	1	2
12	France	0	0	4	4
13	Bulgaria	0	0	2	2
14	Poland	0	0	1	1
Totals (14 entries)		48	48	48	144

== Achievements ==
Victory in this World Cup (all-time number of victories in parentheses)

Men

- Viktor Maigourov (RUS), 4 (7) first places
- Sven Fischer (GER), 3 (8) first places
- Ole Einar Bjørndalen (NOR), 3 (4) first places
- Wilfried Pallhuber (ITA), 2 (6) first places
- Ludwig Gredler (AUT), 2 (6) first places
- Ricco Groß (GER), 2 (2) first places
- Mark Kirchner (GER), 1 (5) first place
- Vadim Sashurin (BLR), 1 (1) first place
- Pavel Mouslimov (RUS), 1 (1) first place

Women

- Magdalena Forsberg (SWE), 4 (6) first places
- Uschi Disl (GER), 3 (11) first places
- Petra Behle (GER), 3 (5) first places
- Olga Romasko (RUS), 2 (3) first places
- Svetlana Paramygina (BLR), 1 (9) first place
- Simone Greiner (GER), 1 (3) first place
- Tetyana Vodopyanova (UKR), 1 (2) first place
- Andreja Grašič (SVN), 1 (2) first place
- Anna Volkova (RUS), 1 (1) first place
- Olga Melnik (RUS), 1 (1) first place
- Annette Sikveland (NOR), 1 (1) first place

== Retirements ==
The following notable biathletes retired after the 1996–97 season:

- Hervé Flandin (FRA)
- Stéphane Bouthiaux (FRA)
- Mariya Manolova (BUL)
- Veronique Claudel (FRA)
- Svetlana Panyutina (RUS)
