= 2000–01 Biathlon World Cup =

Biathlon competition

2000–01 World Cup
Discipline	Men	Women
Overall	(France) Raphaël Poirée	(Sweden) Magdalena Forsberg
Nations Cup	Norway	Germany
Individual	(Russia) Sergei Rozhkov	(Sweden) Magdalena Forsberg
Sprint	(Norway) Ole Einar Bjørndalen	(Sweden) Magdalena Forsberg
Pursuit	(France) Raphaël Poirée	(Sweden) Magdalena Forsberg
Mass start	(Germany) Sven Fischer	(Sweden) Magdalena Forsberg
Relay	Norway	Norway

Competition

The 2000–01 Biathlon World Cup was a multi-race tournament over a season of biathlon, organised by the International Biathlon Union. The season started on 30 November 2000 in Antholz-Anterselva, Italy, and ended on 18 March 2001 in Holmenkollen, Norway. It was the 24th season of the Biathlon World Cup.

== Calendar ==
Below is the IBU World Cup calendar for the 2000–01 season.

Location	Date	Individual	Sprint	Pursuit	Mass start	Relay	Details
(Italy) Antholz-Anterselva (Note: Originally scheduled to be held in Hochfilzen, Austria)	30 November–3 December	●	●			●	details
(Italy) Antholz-Anterselva (Note: Originally scheduled to be held in Pokljuka, Slovenia)	7–10 December		●	●		●	details
(Italy) Antholz-Anterselva (Note: Originally scheduled to be held in Brezno-Osrblie, Slovakia)	14–17 December	●	●	●			details
(Germany) Oberhof	4–7 January		●	●	●		details
(Germany) Ruhpolding	10–14 January		●	●		●	details
(Italy) Antholz-Anterselva	18–21 January		●		●	●	details
(Slovenia) Pokljuka	3–11 February	●	●	●	●	●	World Championships
(United States) Salt Lake City	28 February–3 March	●	●	●			details
(United States) Lake Placid	7 March		●				details
(Norway) Holmenkollen	16–18 March		●	●	●		details
Total		4	10	7	4	5	

== World Cup Podium ==
=== Men ===
Stage	Date	Place	Discipline	Winner	Second	Third	Yellow bib (After competition)	Det.
1	30 November 2000	(Italy) Antholz-Anterselva	20 km Individual	(Czech Republic) Zdeněk Vítek	(Germany) Carsten Heymann	(Russia) Sergei Rozhkov	(Czech Republic) Zdeněk Vítek	Detail
1	1 December 2000	(Italy) Antholz-Anterselva	10 km Sprint	(Norway) Ole Einar Bjørndalen	(France) Raphaël Poirée	(Germany) Sven Fischer	(France) Raphaël Poirée	Detail
2	7 December 2000	(Italy) Antholz-Anterselva	10 km Sprint	(France) Raphaël Poirée	(Russia) Pavel Rostovtsev	(Norway) Ole Einar Bjørndalen	(France) Raphaël Poirée	Detail
2	8 December 2000	(Italy) Antholz-Anterselva	12.5 km Pursuit	(France) Raphaël Poirée	(Norway) Ole Einar Bjørndalen	(Norway) Frode Andresen	(France) Raphaël Poirée	Detail
3	14 December 2000	(Italy) Antholz-Anterselva	20 km Individual	(Russia) Sergei Rozhkov	(France) Raphaël Poirée	(Germany) Ricco Groß	(France) Raphaël Poirée	Detail
3	15 December 2000	(Italy) Antholz-Anterselva	10 km Sprint	(France) Raphaël Poirée	(Norway) Ole Einar Bjørndalen	(Belarus) Vadim Sashurin	(France) Raphaël Poirée	Detail
3	17 December 2000	(Italy) Antholz-Anterselva	12.5 km Pursuit	(Norway) Ole Einar Bjørndalen	(France) Raphaël Poirée	(Germany) Sven Fischer	(France) Raphaël Poirée	Detail
4	4 January 2001	(Germany) Oberhof	10 km Sprint	(France) Raphaël Poirée	(Sweden) Tord Wiksten	(Germany) Carsten Heymann	(France) Raphaël Poirée	Detail
4	6 January 2001	(Germany) Oberhof	12.5 km Pursuit	(Russia) Viktor Maigourov	(France) Raphaël Poirée	(Norway) Frode Andresen	(France) Raphaël Poirée	Detail
4	7 January 2001	(Germany) Oberhof	15 km Mass Start	(Germany) Sven Fischer	(Norway) Egil Gjelland	(Slovenia) Tomaž Globočnik	(France) Raphaël Poirée	Detail
5	12 January 2001	(Germany) Ruhpolding	10 km Sprint	(Norway) Ole Einar Bjørndalen	(France) Raphaël Poirée	(Norway) Egil Gjelland	(France) Raphaël Poirée	Detail
5	14 January 2001	(Germany) Ruhpolding	12.5 km Pursuit	(France) Raphaël Poirée	(Germany) Frank Luck	(Germany) Ricco Groß	(France) Raphaël Poirée	Detail
6	18 January 2001	(Italy) Antholz-Anterselva	10 km Sprint	(Norway) Ole Einar Bjørndalen	(France) Raphaël Poirée	(Norway) Frode Andresen	(France) Raphaël Poirée	Detail
6	21 January 2001	(Italy) Antholz-Anterselva	15 km Mass Start	(Norway) Ole Einar Bjørndalen	(Germany) Carsten Heymann	(Russia) Pavel Rostovtsev	(France) Raphaël Poirée	Detail
WC	3 February 2001	(Slovenia) Pokljuka	10 km Sprint	(Russia) Pavel Rostovtsev	(Italy) René Cattarinussi	(Norway) Halvard Hanevold	(France) Raphaël Poirée	Detail
WC	4 February 2001	(Slovenia) Pokljuka	12.5 km Pursuit	(Russia) Pavel Rostovtsev	(France) Raphaël Poirée	(Germany) Sven Fischer	(France) Raphaël Poirée	Detail
WC	7 February 2001	(Slovenia) Pokljuka	20 km Individual	(Finland) Paavo Puurunen	(Belarus) Vadim Sashurin	(Latvia) Ilmārs Bricis	(France) Raphaël Poirée	Detail
WC	9 February 2001	(Slovenia) Pokljuka	15 km Mass Start	(France) Raphaël Poirée	(Norway) Ole Einar Bjørndalen	(Germany) Sven Fischer	(France) Raphaël Poirée	Detail
7	28 February 2001	(United States) Salt Lake City	20 km Individual	(Norway) Ole Einar Bjørndalen	(Germany) Sven Fischer	(France) Julien Robert	(France) Raphaël Poirée	Detail
7	2 March 2001	(United States) Salt Lake City	10 km Sprint	(Norway) Ole Einar Bjørndalen	(Norway) Frode Andresen	(Germany) Frank Luck	(France) Raphaël Poirée	Detail
7	3 March 2001	(United States) Salt Lake City	12.5 km Pursuit	(Norway) Ole Einar Bjørndalen	(Belarus) Vadim Sashurin	(Russia) Pavel Rostovtsev	(France) Raphaël Poirée	Detail
8	7 March 2001	(United States) Lake Placid	10 km Sprint	(Norway) Frode Andresen	(Norway) Ole Einar Bjørndalen	(Sweden) Henrik Forsberg	(France) Raphaël Poirée	Detail
9	16 March 2001	(Norway) Oslo Holmenkollen	10 km Sprint	(Norway) Frode Andresen	(Norway) Ole Einar Bjørndalen	(Norway) Halvard Hanevold	(France) Raphaël Poirée	Detail
9	17 March 2001	(Norway) Oslo Holmenkollen	12.5 km Pursuit	(Norway) Frode Andresen	(Norway) Ole Einar Bjørndalen	(Norway) Egil Gjelland	(France) Raphaël Poirée	Detail
9	18 March 2001	(Norway) Oslo Holmenkollen	15 km Mass Start	(Germany) Sven Fischer	(France) Raphaël Poirée	(Norway) Frode Andresen	(France) Raphaël Poirée	Detail

=== Women ===
Stage	Date	Place	Discipline	Winner	Second	Third	Yellow bib (After competition)	Det.
1	30 November 2000	(Italy) Antholz-Anterselva	15 km Individual	(France) Corinne Niogret	(Germany) Andrea Henkel	(Sweden) Magdalena Forsberg	(France) Corinne Niogret	Detail
1	1 December 2000	(Italy) Antholz-Anterselva	7.5 km Sprint	(Ukraine) Olena Zubrilova	(France) Corinne Niogret	(Ukraine) Olena Petrova	(France) Corinne Niogret	Detail
2	7 December 2000	(Italy) Antholz-Anterselva	7.5 km Sprint	(Norway) Gro Marit Istad	(Russia) Olga Pyleva	(Germany) Kati Wilhelm	(France) Corinne Niogret	Detail
2	8 December 2000	(Italy) Antholz-Anterselva	10 km Pursuit	(Sweden) Magdalena Forsberg	(France) Corinne Niogret	(Ukraine) Olena Zubrilova	(France) Corinne Niogret	Detail
3	14 December 2000	(Italy) Antholz-Anterselva	15 km Individual	(France) Sandrine Bailly	(France) Corinne Niogret	(Sweden) Magdalena Forsberg	(France) Corinne Niogret	Detail
3	16 December 2000	(Italy) Antholz-Anterselva	7.5 km Sprint	(Sweden) Magdalena Forsberg	(Norway) Liv Grete Poirée	(Ukraine) Tetyana Vodopyanova	(Sweden) Magdalena Forsberg	Detail
3	17 December 2000	(Italy) Antholz-Anterselva	10 km Pursuit	(Sweden) Magdalena Forsberg	(Germany) Andrea Henkel	(Germany) Uschi Disl	(Sweden) Magdalena Forsberg	Detail
4	5 January 2001	(Germany) Oberhof	7.5 km Sprint	(Sweden) Magdalena Forsberg	(Ukraine) Olena Zubrilova	(France) Corinne Niogret	(Sweden) Magdalena Forsberg	Detail
4	6 January 2001	(Germany) Oberhof	10 km Pursuit	(Sweden) Magdalena Forsberg	(Ukraine) Olena Zubrilova	(Germany) Uschi Disl	(Sweden) Magdalena Forsberg	Detail
4	7 January 2001	(Germany) Oberhof	12.5 km Mass Start	(Sweden) Magdalena Forsberg	(Russia) Svetlana Tchernousova	(Norway) Liv Grete Poirée	(Sweden) Magdalena Forsberg	Detail
5	13 January 2001	(Germany) Ruhpolding	7.5 km Sprint	(Sweden) Magdalena Forsberg	(Norway) Liv Grete Poirée	(Germany) Katrin Apel	(Sweden) Magdalena Forsberg	Detail
5	14 January 2001	(Germany) Ruhpolding	10 km Pursuit	(Sweden) Magdalena Forsberg	(Norway) Liv Grete Poirée	(Russia) Galina Koukleva	(Sweden) Magdalena Forsberg	Detail
6	18 January 2001	(Italy) Antholz-Anterselva	7.5 km Sprint	(Sweden) Magdalena Forsberg	(Russia) Olga Pyleva	(Germany) Martina Glagow	(Sweden) Magdalena Forsberg	Detail
6	21 January 2001	(Italy) Antholz-Anterselva	12.5 km Mass Start	(France) Corinne Niogret	(France) Delphyne Heymann-Burlet	(Germany) Uschi Disl	(Sweden) Magdalena Forsberg	Detail
WC	3 February 2001	(Slovenia) Pokljuka	7.5 km Sprint	(Germany) Kati Wilhelm	(Germany) Uschi Disl	(Norway) Liv Grete Poirée	(Sweden) Magdalena Forsberg	Detail
WC	4 February 2001	(Slovenia) Pokljuka	10 km Pursuit	(Norway) Liv Grete Poirée	(France) Corinne Niogret	(Sweden) Magdalena Forsberg	(Sweden) Magdalena Forsberg	Detail
WC	6 February 2001	(Slovenia) Pokljuka	15 km Individual	(Sweden) Magdalena Forsberg	(Norway) Liv Grete Poirée	(Ukraine) Olena Zubrilova	(Sweden) Magdalena Forsberg	Detail
WC	9 February 2001	(Slovenia) Pokljuka	12.5 km Mass Start	(Sweden) Magdalena Forsberg	(Germany) Martina Glagow	(Norway) Liv Grete Poirée	(Sweden) Magdalena Forsberg	Detail
7	28 February 2001	(United States) Salt Lake City	15 km Individual	(Sweden) Magdalena Forsberg	(Germany) Martina Zellner	(Germany) Martina Glagow	(Sweden) Magdalena Forsberg	Detail
7	2 March 2001	(United States) Salt Lake City	7.5 km Sprint	(Germany) Uschi Disl	(Norway) Liv Grete Poirée	(Germany) Andrea Henkel	(Sweden) Magdalena Forsberg	Detail
7	3 March 2001	(United States) Salt Lake City	10 km Pursuit	(Sweden) Magdalena Forsberg	(Norway) Liv Grete Poirée	(France) Corinne Niogret	(Sweden) Magdalena Forsberg	Detail
8	7 March 2001	(United States) Lake Placid	7.5 km Sprint	(Germany) Kati Wilhelm	(Germany) Martina Zellner	(France) Delphyne Heymann-Burlet	(Sweden) Magdalena Forsberg	Detail
9	16 March 2001	(Norway) Oslo Holmenkollen	7.5 km Sprint	(Norway) Liv Grete Poirée	(Sweden) Magdalena Forsberg	(Italy) Nathalie Santer	(Sweden) Magdalena Forsberg	Detail
9	17 March 2001	(Norway) Oslo Holmenkollen	10 km Pursuit	(Sweden) Magdalena Forsberg	(Norway) Liv Grete Poirée	(Germany) Martina Glagow	(Sweden) Magdalena Forsberg	Detail
9	18 March 2001	(Norway) Oslo Holmenkollen	12.5 km Mass Start	(China) Yu Shumei	(Sweden) Magdalena Forsberg	(Ukraine) Olena Zubrilova	(Sweden) Magdalena Forsberg	Detail

=== Men's team ===
Event	Date	Place	Discipline	Winner	Second	Third
1	3 December 2000	(Italy) Antholz-Anterselva	4x7.5 km Relay	Czech Republic Petr Garabík; Ivan Masařík; Tomáš Holubec; Zdeněk Vítek	Ukraine Vyacheslav Derkach; Andriy Deryzemlya; Olexander Bilanenko; Ruslan Lysenko	Germany Peter Sendel; Sven Fischer; Carsten Heymann; Ricco Gross
2	9 December 2000	(Italy) Antholz	4x7.5 km Relay	Norway Halvard Hanevold; Frode Andresen; Egil Gjelland; Ole Einar Bjørndalen	Czech Republic Petr Garabík; Ivan Masařík; Roman Dostál; Zdeněk Vítek	Russia Sergei Rozhkov; Andrei Prokunin; Mikhail Kochkin; Alexei Kobelev
5	10 January 2001	(Germany) Ruhpolding	4x7.5 km Relay	Norway Egil Gjelland; Frode Andresen; Dag Bjørndalen; Ole Einar Bjørndalen	Germany Marco Morgenstern; Peter Sendel; Alexander Wolf; Ricco Gross	Belarus Alexei Aidarov; Alexandr Syman; Oleg Ryzhenkov; Vadim Sashurin
6	20 January 2001	(Italy) Antholz-Anterselva	4x7.5 km Relay	Germany Marco Morgenstern; Sven Fischer; Frank Luck; Ricco Gross	Norway Egil Gjelland; Frode Andresen; Halvard Hanevold; Ole Einar Bjørndalen	Russia Sergei Rozhkov; Andrei Prokunin; Pavel Rostovtsev; Viktor Maigourov
WC	11 February 2001	(Slovenia) Pokljuka	4x7.5 km Relay	France Gilles Marguet; Vincent Defrasne; Julien Robert; Raphael Poiree	Belarus Alexei Aidarov; Alexandr Syman; Oleg Ryzhenkov; Vadim Sashurin	Norway Egil Gjelland; Frode Andresen; Halvard Hanevold; Ole Einar Bjørndalen

=== Women's team ===
Event	Date	Place	Discipline	Winner	Second	Third
1	3 December 2000	(Italy) Antholz-Anterselva	4x7.5 km Relay	Norway Ann-Elen Skjelbreid; Gro Marit Istad; Gunn Margit Andreassen; Liv Grete Poiree	Germany Uschi Disl; Andrea Henkel; Katrin Apel; Martina Glagow	Ukraine Olena Zubrilova; Olena Petrova; Nina Lemesh; Tetyana Vodopyanova
2	10 December 2000	(Italy) Antholz	4x7.5 km Relay	Germany Uschi Disl; Kati Wilhelm; Katrin Apel; Andrea Henkel	France Sylvie Becaert; Delphyne Heymann; Sandrine Bailly; Corinne Niogret	Russia Olga Pyleva; Galina Kukleva; Anna Bogaliy; Svetlana Tchernousova
5	11 January 2001	(Germany) Ruhpolding	4x7.5 km Relay	Norway Ann-Elen Skjelbreid; Gro Marit Istad; Linda Tjorhom; Liv Grete Poiree	Germany Uschi Disl; Martina Glagow; Katrin Apel; Andrea Henkel	Russia Olga Pyleva; Svetlana Ishmouratova; Galina Kukleva; Svetlana Tchernousova
6	19 January 2001	(Italy) Antholz-Anterselva	4x7.5 km Relay	Norway Ann-Elen Skjelbreid; Gro Marit Istad; Linda Tjorhom; Gunn Margit Andreassen	Russia Anna Bogaliy; Svetlana Tchernousova; Svetlana Ishmouratova; Olga Pyleva	Ukraine Olena Zubrilova; Olena Petrova; Nina Lemesh; Tetyana Vodopyanova
WC	10 February 2001	(Slovenia) Pokljuka	4x7.5 km Relay	Russia Olga Pyleva; Anna Bogaliy; Galina Kukleva; Svetlana Ishmouratova	Germany Uschi Disl; Katrin Apel; Andrea Henkel; Kati Wilhelm	Ukraine Olena Zubrilova; Olena Petrova; Nina Lemesh; Tetyana Vodopyanova

== Standings: Men ==
=== Overall ===
Pos.		Points
1.	(France) Raphaël Poirée	921
2.	(Norway) Ole Einar Bjørndalen	911
3.	(Norway) Frode Andresen	712
4.	(Russia) Pavel Rostovtsev	707
5.	(Germany) Sven Fischer	675

- Final standings after 25 races.

=== Individual ===
Pos.		Points
1.	(Russia) Sergei Rozhkov	133
2.	(Norway) Ole Einar Bjørndalen	110
3.	(Germany) Ricco Groß	109
4.	(Germany) Sven Fischer	107
5.	(Germany) Carsten Heymann	101

- Final standings after 4 races.

=== Sprint ===
Pos.		Points
1.	(Norway) Ole Einar Bjørndalen	393
2.	(France) Raphaël Poirée	375
3.	(Norway) Frode Andresen	337
4.	(Russia) Pavel Rostovtsev	282
5.	(Norway) Halvard Hanevold	280

- Final standings after 10 races.

=== Pursuit ===
Pos.		Points
1.	(France) Raphaël Poirée	278
2.	(Norway) Ole Einar Bjørndalen	272
3.	(Norway) Frode Andresen	247
4.	(Russia) Pavel Rostovtsev	228
5.	(Germany) Sven Fischer	190

- Final standings after 7 races.

=== Mass Start ===
Pos.		Points
1.	(Germany) Sven Fischer	143
2.	(Norway) Ole Einar Bjørndalen	136
3.	(France) Raphaël Poirée	136
4.	(Norway) Egil Gjelland	120
5.	(Germany) Ricco Groß	109

- Final standings after 4 races.

=== Relay ===
Pos.		Points
1.	Norway	189
2.	Germany	173
3.	Czech Republic	167
4.	Belarus	165
5.	Russia	158

- Final standings after 5 races.

=== Nation ===
Pos.		Points
1.	Norway	4919
2.	Germany	4713
3.	Russia	4455
4.	France	4356
5.	Slovenia	3905

- Final standings after 19 races.

== Standings: Women ==
=== Overall ===
Pos.		Points
1.	(Sweden) Magdalena Forsberg	1021
2.	(Norway) Liv Grete Poirée	804
3.	(Ukraine) Olena Zubrilova	774
4.	(France) Corinne Niogret	665
5.	(Germany) Andrea Henkel	635

- Final standings after 25 races.

=== Individual ===
Pos.		Points
1.	(Sweden) Magdalena Forsberg	143
2.	(France) Corinne Niogret	110
3.	(Norway) Liv Grete Poirée	110
4.	(Germany) Andrea Henkel	110
5.	(Germany) Martina Glagow	102

- Final standings after 4 races.

=== Sprint ===
Pos.		Points
1.	(Sweden) Magdalena Forsberg	368
2.	(Norway) Liv Grete Poirée	312
3.	(Ukraine) Olena Zubrilova	284
4.	(Russia) Olga Pyleva	252
5.	(France) Corinne Niogret	245

- Final standings after 10 races.

=== Pursuit ===
Pos.		Points
1.	(Sweden) Magdalena Forsberg	300
2.	(Norway) Liv Grete Poirée	252
3.	(Ukraine) Olena Zubrilova	246
4.	(France) Corinne Niogret	213
5.	(Germany) Andrea Henkel	210

- Final standings after 7 races.

=== Mass Start ===
Pos.		Points
1.	(Sweden) Magdalena Forsberg	146
2.	(Norway) Liv Grete Poirée	120
3.	(Germany) Martina Glagow	117
4.	(Ukraine) Olena Zubrilova	113
5.	(Germany) Uschi Disl	111

- Final standings after 4 races.

=== Relay ===
Pos.		Points
1.	Norway	190
2.	Germany	188
3.	Russia	182
4.	Ukraine	169
5.	France	149

- Final standings after 5 races.

=== Nation ===
Pos.		Points
1.	Germany	4851
2.	Russia	4635
3.	Ukraine	4470
4.	France	4406
5.	Norway	4393

- Final standings after 19 races.

== Medal table ==
Rank	Nation	Gold	Silver	Bronze	Total
1	Norway	19	16	13	48
2	Sweden	14	3	4	21
3	France	10	14	4	28
4	Germany	7	14	18	39
5	Russia	5	5	8	18
6	Czech Republic	2	1	0	3
7	Ukraine	1	3	8	12
8	China	1	0	0	1
8	Finland	1	0	0	1
10	Belarus	0	3	2	5
11	Italy	0	1	1	2
12	Latvia	0	0	1	1
12	Slovenia	0	0	1	1
Totals (13 entries)		60	60	60	180

== Achievements ==
First World Cup career victory

- Zdeněk Vítek (CZE), 23, in his 5th season — the WC 1 Individual in Antholz-Anterselva; first podium was 1999–2000 Pursuit in Oberhof
- Sandrine Bailly (FRA), 21, in her 2nd season — the WC 3 Individual in Antholz-Anterselva; it also was her first podium
- Kati Wilhelm (GER), 24, in her 1st season — the World Championships Sprint in Pokljuka; first podium was 2000–01 Sprint in Antholz-Anterselva
- Paavo Puurunen (FIN), 27, in his 7th season — the World Championships Individual in Pokljuka; it also was his first podium
- Yu Shumei (CHN), 23, in her 6th season — the WC 9 Mass Start in Holmenkollen; first podium was 1995–96 Sprint in Antholz-Anterselva

First World Cup podium

- Kati Wilhelm (GER), 24, in her 1st season — no. 3 in the WC 2 Sprint in Antholz-Anterselva
- Tord Wiksten (SWE), 29, in his 8th season — no. 2 in the WC 4 Sprint in Oberhof
- Tomaž Globočnik (SLO), 28, in his 7th season — no. 3 in the WC 4 Mass Start in Oberhof
- Julien Robert (FRA), 26, in his 6th season — no. 3 in the WC 7 Individual in Salt Lake City
- Henrik Forsberg (SWE), 34, in his 2nd season — no. 3 in the WC 8 Sprint in Lake Placid

Victory in this World Cup (all-time number of victories in parentheses)

Men

- Ole Einar Bjørndalen (NOR), 8 (22) first places
- Raphaël Poirée (FRA), 6 (14) first places
- Frode Andresen (NOR), 3 (11) first places
- Sven Fischer (GER), 2 (19) first places
- Pavel Rostovtsev (RUS), 2 (3) first places
- Viktor Maigourov (RUS), 1 (8) first place
- Sergei Rozhkov (RUS), 1 (2) first place
- Zdeněk Vítek (CZE), 1 (1) first place
- Paavo Puurunen (FIN), 1 (1) first place

Women

- Magdalena Forsberg (SWE), 14 (33) first places
- Corinne Niogret (FRA), 2 (8) first places
- Liv Grete Skjelbreid Poirée (NOR), 2 (7) first places
- Kati Wilhelm (GER), 2 (2) first places
- Uschi Disl (GER), 1 (20) first place
- Olena Zubrilova (UKR), 1 (15) first place
- Gro Marit Istad Kristiansen (NOR), 1 (2) first place
- Sandrine Bailly (FRA), 1 (1) first place
- Yu Shumei (CHN), 1 (1) first place

== Retirements ==
Following notable biathletes announced their retirement during or after the 2000–01 season:

- Pavel Mouslimov (RUS)
- Svetlana Paramygina (BLR)
