= Biathlon at the 1998 Winter Olympics – Women's relay =

Women's biathlon relay at the XVIII Olympic Winter Games
- Venue: Nozawa Onsen
- Dates: 19 February 1998
- Competitors: 68 from 17 nations
- Winning time: 1:40:13.6

Medalists
1st place, gold medalist(s)		Uschi Disl; Martina Zellner; Katrin Apel; Petra Behle	Germany
2nd place, silver medalist(s)		Olga Melnik; Galina Kukleva; Albina Akhatova; Olga Romasko	Russia
3rd place, bronze medalist(s)		Ann-Elen Skjelbreid; Annette Sikveland; Gunn Margit Andreassen; Liv Grete Skjelbreid	Norway

The Women's 4 × 7.5 kilometre biathlon relay competition at the 1998 Winter Olympics 19 February, at Nozawa Onsen. Each national team consisted of four members, with each skiing 7.5 kilometres and shooting twice, once prone and once standing.

At each shooting station, a competitor has eight shots to hit five targets; however, only five bullets are loaded in a magazine at one - if additional shots are required, the spare bullets must be loaded one at a time. If after the eight shots are taken, there are still targets not yet hit, the competitor must ski a 150-metre penalty loop.

== Results ==
Rank	Bib	Team	Penalties (P+S)	Result	Deficit
1st place, gold medalist(s)	6	Germany; Uschi Disl; Martina Zellner; Katrin Apel; Petra Behle	0+5 0+6; 0+2 0+3; 0+1 0+0; 0+0 0+2; 0+2 0+1	1:40:13.6; 25:20.3; 24:46.1; 24:39.2; 25:28.0	–
2nd place, silver medalist(s)	7	Russia; Olga Melnik; Galina Kukleva; Albina Akhatova; Olga Romasko	0+7 0+2; 0+1 0+2; 0+3 0+0; 0+2 0+0; 0+1 0+0	1:40:25.2; 25:32.1; 24:27.4; 24:59.8; 25:25.9	+11.6
3rd place, bronze medalist(s)	4	Norway; Ann-Elen Skjelbreid; Annette Sikveland; Gunn Margit Andreassen; Liv Grete Skjelbreid	1+4 1+6; 0+1 1+3; 1+3 0+1; 0+0 0+0; 0+0 0+2	1:40:37.3; 25:47.2; 24:55.0; 25:20.8; 24:34.3	+23.7
4	8	Slovakia; Martina Schwarzbacherová; Anna Murínová; Tatiana Kutlíková; Soňa Mihoková	0+5 2+4; 0+1 0+0; 0+2 0+1; 0+1 2+3; 0+1 0+0	1:41:20.6; 24:44.5; 24:57.1; 26:31.5; 25:07.5	+1:07.0
5	3	Ukraine; Valentina Tserbe-Nessina; Olena Petrova; Tetyana Vodopyanova; Olena Zubrilova	0+3 0+3; 0+0 0+2; 0+0 0+0; 0+2 0+0; 0+1 0+1	1:42:32.6; 26:36.5; 25:20.9; 25:43.9; 24:51.3	+2:19.0
6	9	Czech Republic; Kateřina Losmanová; Irena Novotná; Jiřína Pelcová; Eva Háková	0+4 0+6; 0+1 0+0; 0+1 0+3; 0+1 0+1; 0+1 0+2	1:43:20.5; 25:32.4; 26:16.6; 26:49.7; 24:41.8	+3:06.9
7	17	China; Yu Shumei; Sun Ribo; Liu Jinfeng; Liu Xianying	0+4 1+6; 0+1 0+0; 0+0 0+2; 0+1 0+1; 0+2 1+3	1:43:32.6; 25:15.7; 25:17.2; 25:59.0; 27:00.7	+3:19.0
8	5	France; Christelle Gros; Emmanuelle Claret; Florence Baverel; Corinne Niogret	0+3 0+5; 0+1 0+2; 0+0 0+2; 0+1 0+0; 0+1 0+1	1:43:54.6; 26:20.6; 25:17.7; 26:20.7; 25:55.6	+3:41.0
9	12	Slovenia; Lucija Larisi; Andreja Grašič; Matejka Mohorič; Tadeja Brankovič	2+8 1+6; 1+3 1+3; 0+1 0+3; 0+1 0+0; 1+3 0+0	1:44:18.8; 27:12.3; 24:44.3; 26:21.5; 26:00.7	+4:05.2
10	2	Sweden; Maria Schylander; Magdalena Forsberg; Kristina Brounéus; Eva-Karin Westin	0+3 0+4; 0+1 0+2; 0+2 0+0; 0+0 0+2; 0+0 0+0	1:44:50.8; 27:28.0; 24:06.2; 26:42.9; 26:33.7	+4:37.2
11	10	Kazakhstan; Inna Sheshkil; Margarita Dulova; Yelena Dubok; Lyudmila Guryeva	0+5 2+6; 0+2 0+2; 0+0 0+1; 0+0 2+3; 0+3 0+0	1:45:22.9; 25:24.6; 25:27.0; 28:35.5; 25:55.8	+5:09.3
12	1	Belarus; Irina Tananayko; Nataliya Ryzhenkova; Nataliya Moroz; Svetlana Paramygina	0+4 0+3; 0+0 0+1; 0+2 0+0; 0+2 0+0; 0+1 0+1	1:45:24.0; 25:42.4; 25:47.5; 28:30.5; 25:23.6	+5:10.4
13	11	Poland; Agata Suszka; Halina Pitoń; Iwona Daniluk; Anna Stera	0+5 2+10; 0+1 0+2; 0+2 1+3; 0+1 0+2; 0+1 1+3	1:45:45.5; 25:58.1; 26:33.6; 27:01.0; 26:12.8	+5:31.9
14	14	Japan; Mami Honma; Hiromi Seino; Mie Takeda; Ryoko Takahashi	1+7 0+8; 0+1 0+1; 1+3 0+3; 0+0 0+3; 0+3 0+1	1:46:23.0; 25:31.2; 26:08.8; 27:51.3; 26:51.7	+6:09.4
15	15	United States; Ntala Skinner; Stacey Wooley; Kara Salmela; Kristina Sabasteanski	0+6 1+6; 0+1 0+2; 0+0 0+1; 0+3 0+0; 0+2 1+3	1:48:30.2; 26:35.0; 27:12.1; 26:21.2; 28:21.9	+8:16.6
16	16	Bulgaria; Radka Popova; Ekaterina Dafovska; Pavlina Filipova; Valentina Peychinova	3+3 0+6; 0+0 0+1; 0+0 0+0; 3+3 0+2; 0+0 0+3	1:48:55.2; 28:06.0; 24:56.4; 27:52.7; 28:00.1	+8:41.6
17	13	Canada; Kristin Berg; Myriam Bédard; Nicole Keddie; Michelle Collard	2+8 1+7; 1+3 0+2; 0+1 0+0; 1+3 1+3; 0+1 0+2	1:53:15.0; 28:44.6; 25:20.0; 29:56.1; 29:14.3	+13:01.4
