= List of Olympic venues in biathlon =

For the Winter Olympics, there are 16 venues that have been or will be used for biathlon. Initially debuting in 1924 as military patrol, the event would debut on its own in 1960. Only three times in the Winter Olympics have the biathlon event has not been in the same cluster as cross-country skiing (1972, 1998, 2006).

| Games | Venue | Other sports hosted at venue for those games | Capacity | Ref. |
|---|---|---|---|---|
| 1924 Chamonix (as military patrol) | Stade Olympique de Chamonix | Cross-country skiing, Curling, Figure skating, Ice hockey, Nordic combined (cross-country skiing), Speed skating | 45,000. | |
| 1960 Squaw Valley | McKinney Creek Stadium | Cross-country skiing, Nordic combined (cross-country skiing) | 1,000 | |
| 1964 Innsbruck | Seefeld | Cross-country skiing, Nordic combined, Ski jumping (normal hill) | Not listed. | |
| 1968 Grenoble | Autrans | Cross-country skiing, Nordic combined, Ski jumping (normal hill) | 40,000 (ski jump) | |
| 1972 Sapporo | Makomanai Biathlon site | None | Not listed. | |
| 1976 Innsbruck | Seefeld | Cross-country skiing, Nordic combined, Ski jumping (normal hill) | Not listed. | |
| 1980 Lake Placid | Lake Placid Olympic Sports Complex Cross Country Biathlon Center | Cross-country skiing, Nordic combined (cross-country skiing) | Not listed. | |
| 1984 Sarajevo | Igman, Veliko Polje | Cross-country skiing, Nordic combined (cross-country skiing) | Not listed. | |
| 1988 Calgary | Canmore Nordic Centre | Cross-country skiing, Nordic combined (cross-country skiing) | Not listed. | |
| 1992 Albertville | Les Saisies | Cross-country skiing | 12,500 | |
| 1994 Lillehammer | Birkebeineren Ski Stadium | Cross-country skiing, Nordic combined (Cross-country skiing) | 31,000 (Cross-country skiing); 13,500 (Biathlon) | |
| 1998 Nagano | Nozawa Onsen Ski Resort | None | 20,000 | |
| 2002 Salt Lake City | Soldier Hollow | Cross-country skiing, Nordic combined (cross-country skiing) | 15,200 | |
| 2006 Turin | Cesana San Sicario | None | 4,700 | |
| 2010 Vancouver | Whistler Olympic Park | Cross-country skiing, Nordic combined, ski jumping | 6,000 | |
| 2014 Sochi | Biathlon & Ski Complex | Cross-country skiing, Nordic combined (cross-country skiing) | 9,600 | |
| 2018 Pyeongchang | Alpensia Biathlon Centre | None | 7,500 | |
| 2022 Beijing | Zhangjiakou National Biathlon Centre | None | Not listed. | |
| 2026 Milan-Cortina | South Tyrol Arena | None | 3,000 | |
| 2030 French Alps | Le Grand-Bornand | None | 12,000-15,000 | |
| 2034 Utah | Soldier Hollow | Cross-country skiing, Nordic combined (cross-country skiing) | 15,000 | |

== Gallery of venues ==
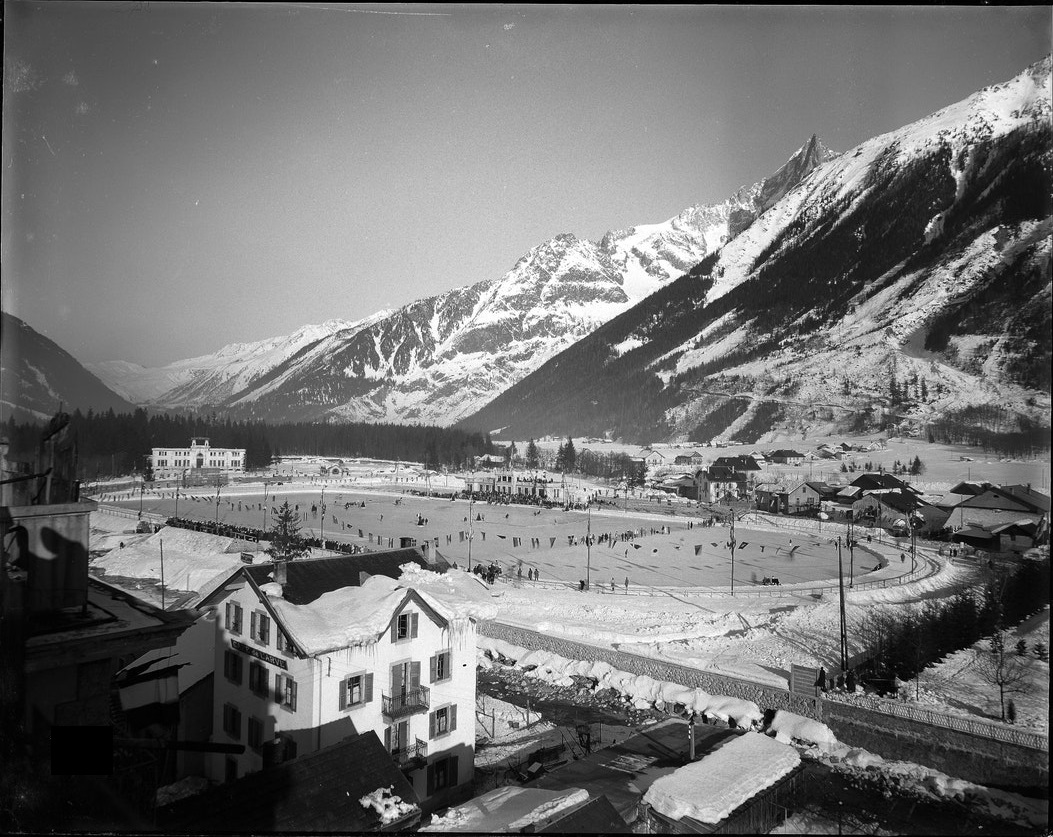
Stade Olympique de Chamonix hosted biathlon at the 1924 Winter Olympics.

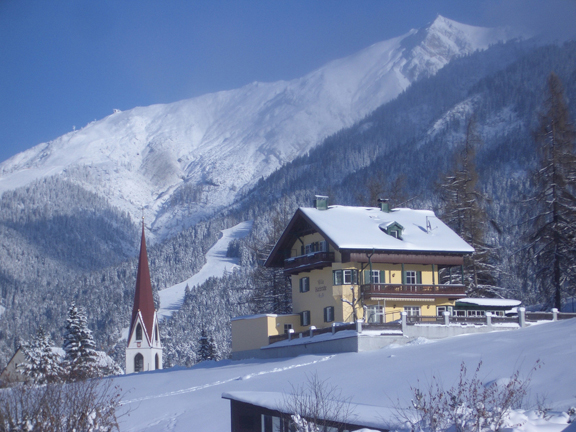
Seefeld hosted biathlon at the 1964 and 1976 Winter Olympics in neighboring Innsbruck.

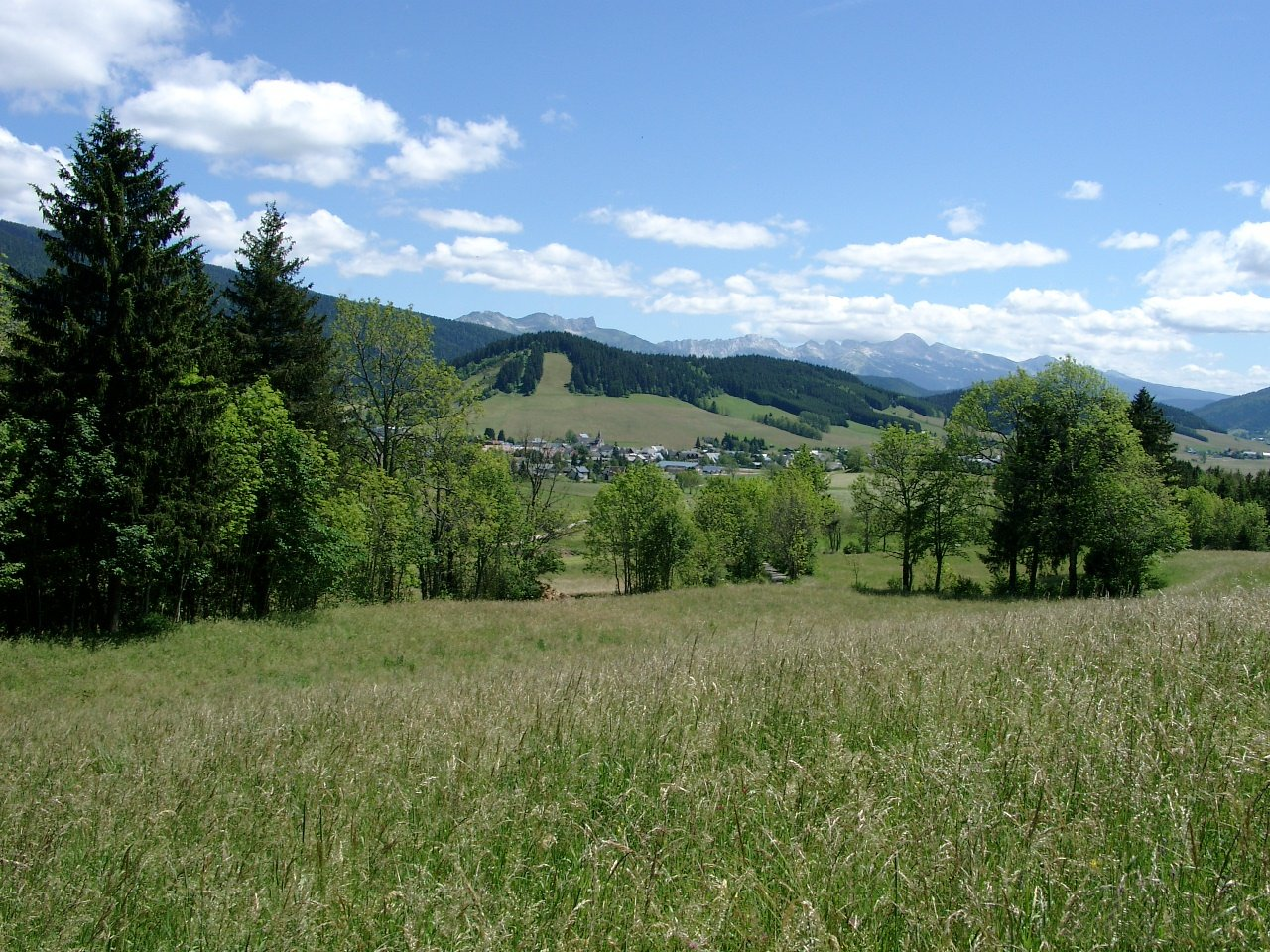
Autrans hosted biathlon at the 1968 Winter Olympics in Grenoble.

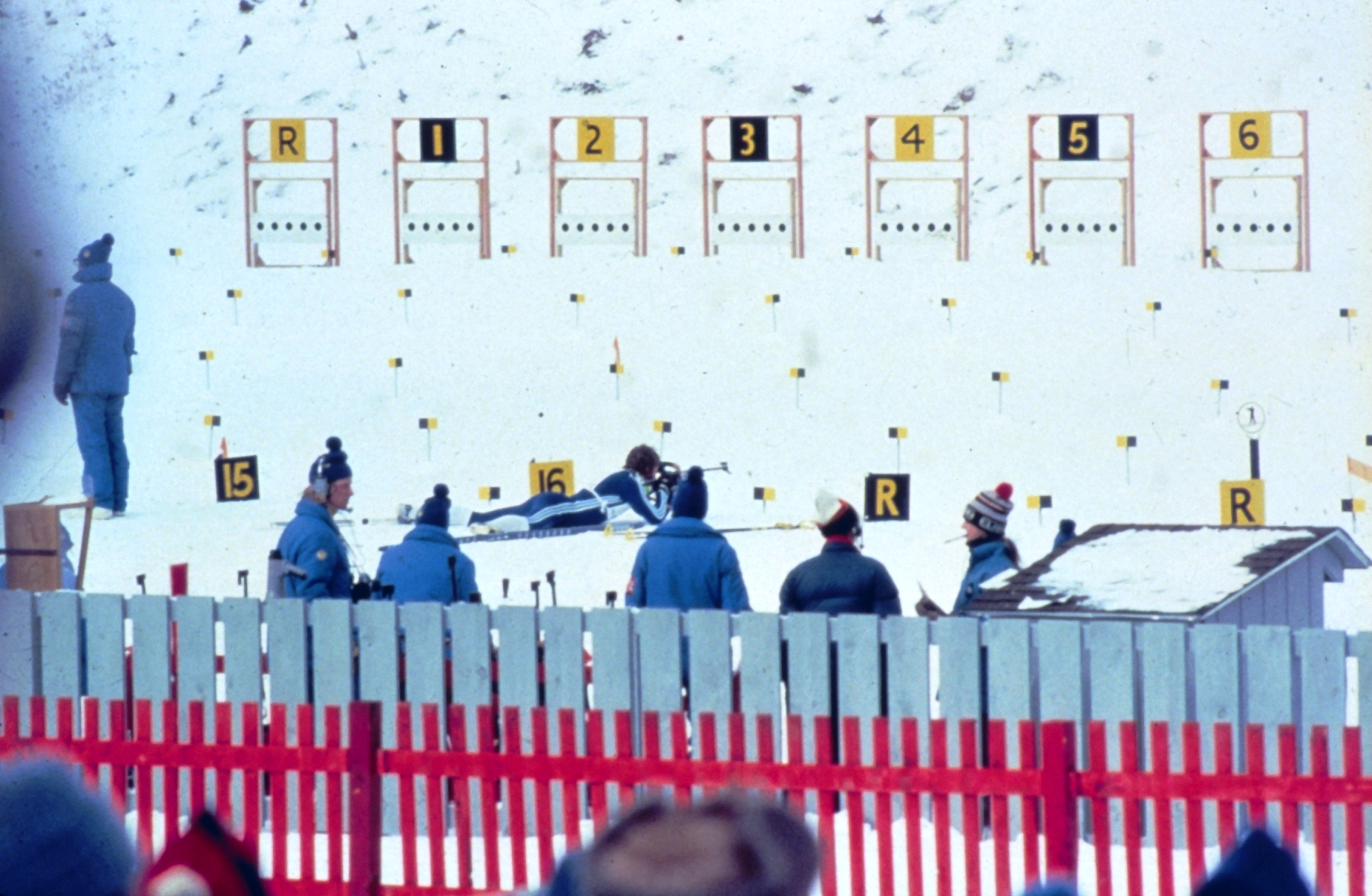
Lake Placid Olympic Sports Complex Cross Country Biathlon Center hosted biathlon at the 1980 Winter Olympics.

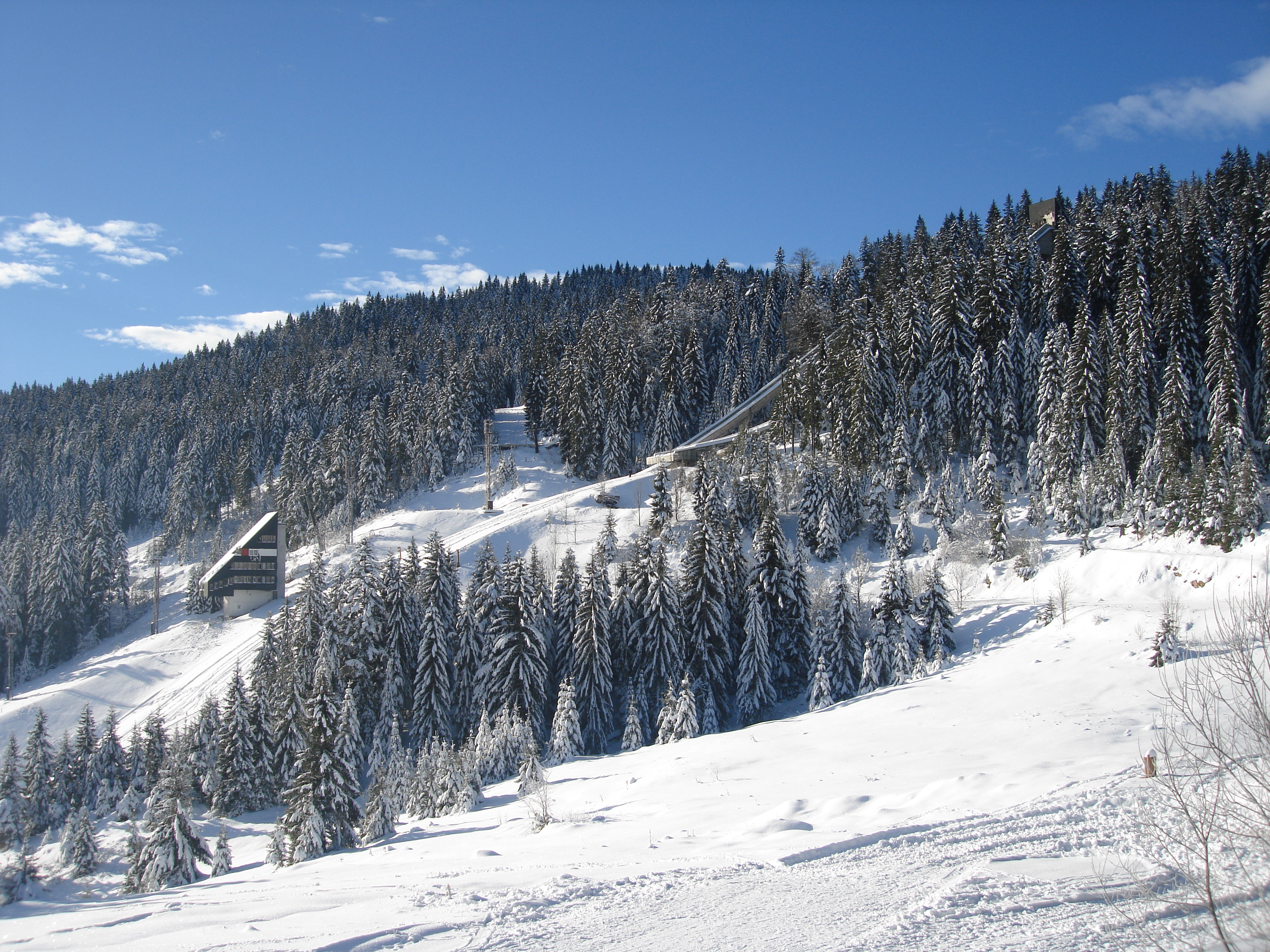
Igman, Veliko Polje hosted biathlon at the 1984 Winter Olympics in Sarajevo.

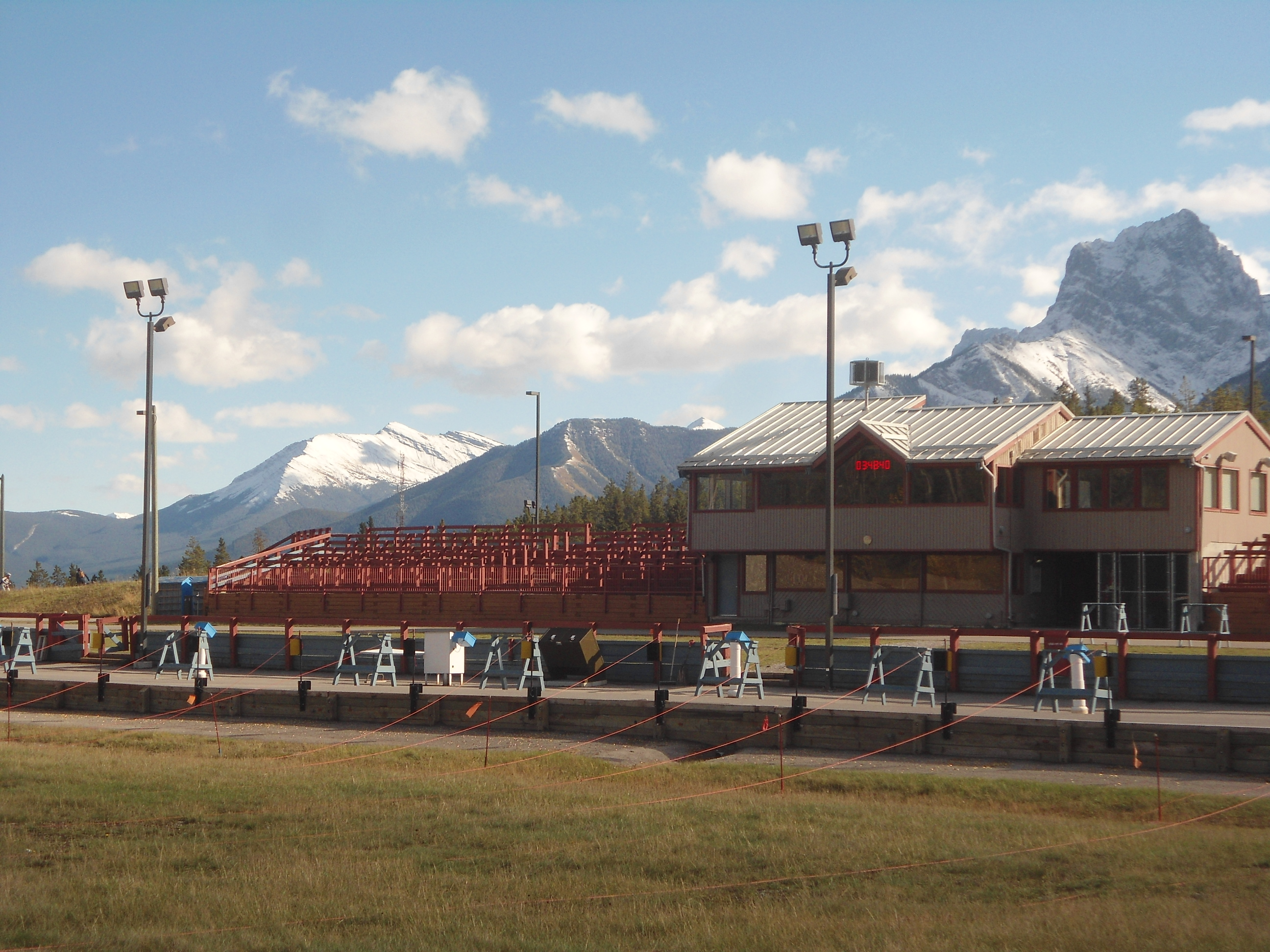
Canmore Nordic Centre Provincial Park hosted biathlon at the 1988 Winter Olympics in Calgary.

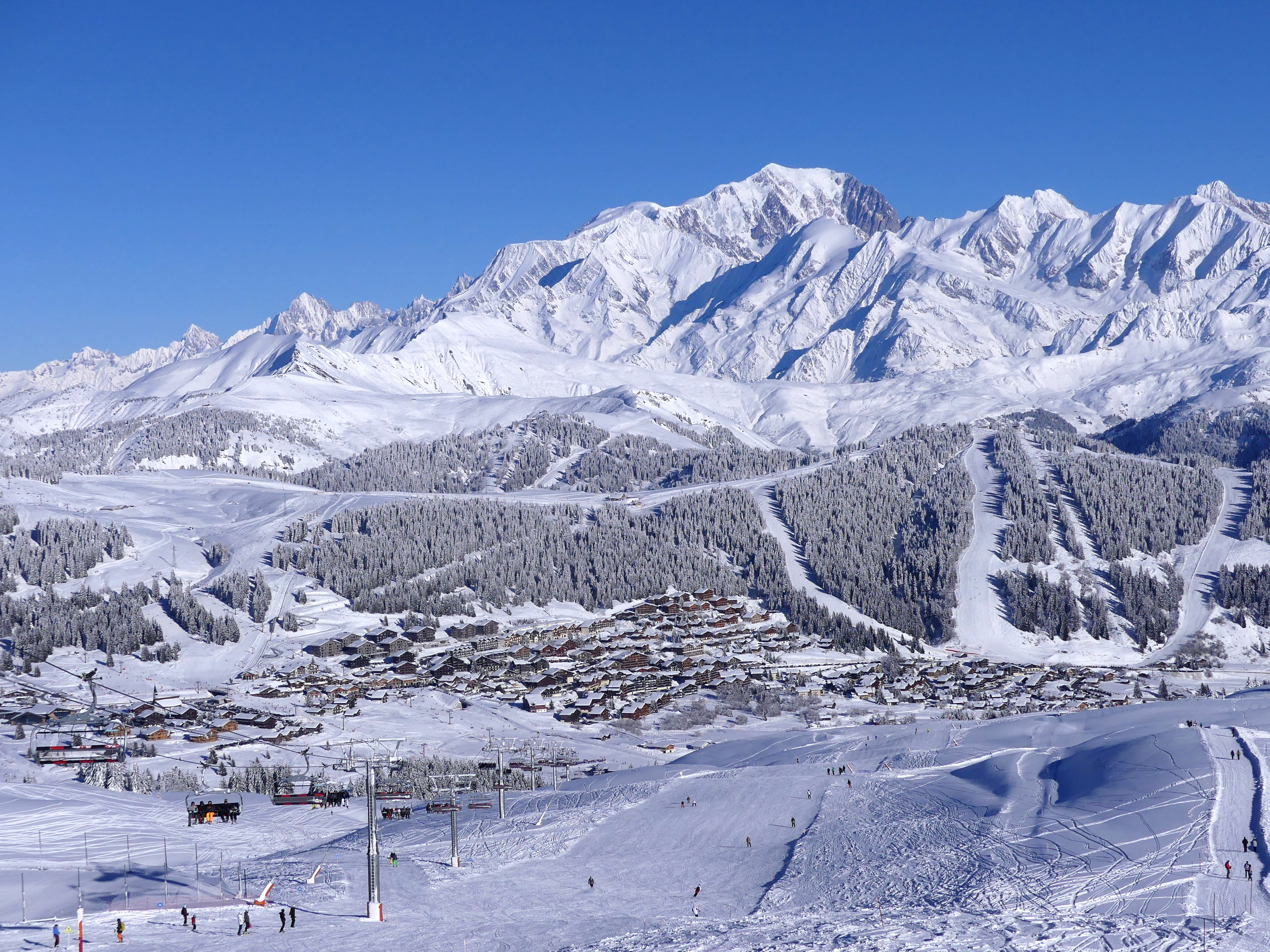
Les Saisies hosted biathlon at the 1992 Winter Olympics in Albertville.

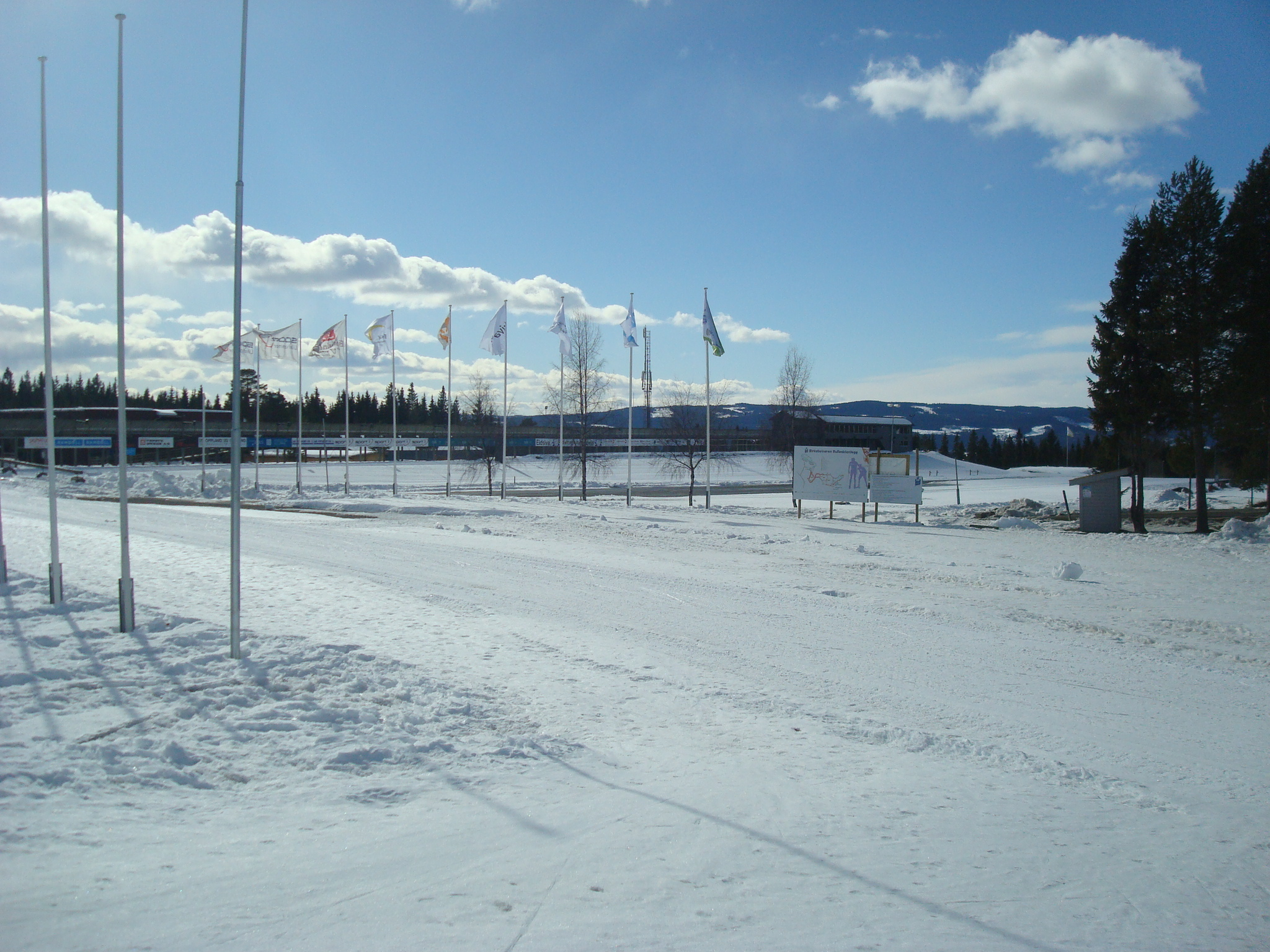
Birkebeineren Ski Stadium hosted biathlon at the 1994 Winter Olympics in Lillehammer.

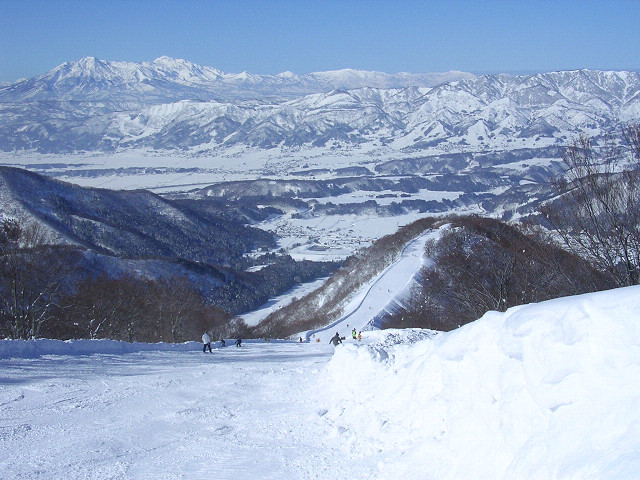
Nozawa Onsen Snow Resort hosted biathlon at the 1998 Winter Olympics in Nagano.

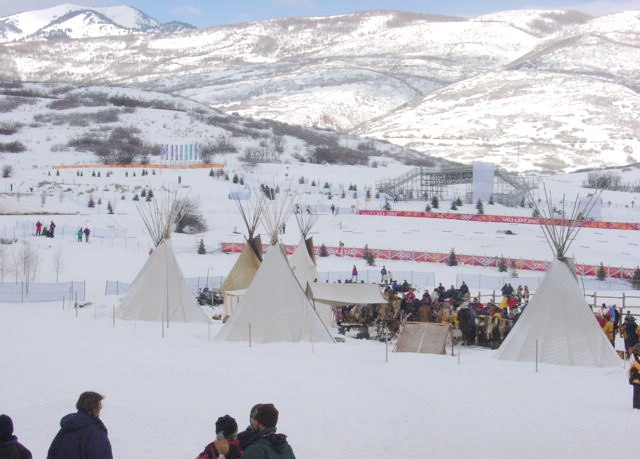
Soldier Hollow hosted biathlon at the 2002 Winter Olympics in Salt Lake City and will do so for a second time at the 2034 Winter Olympics.

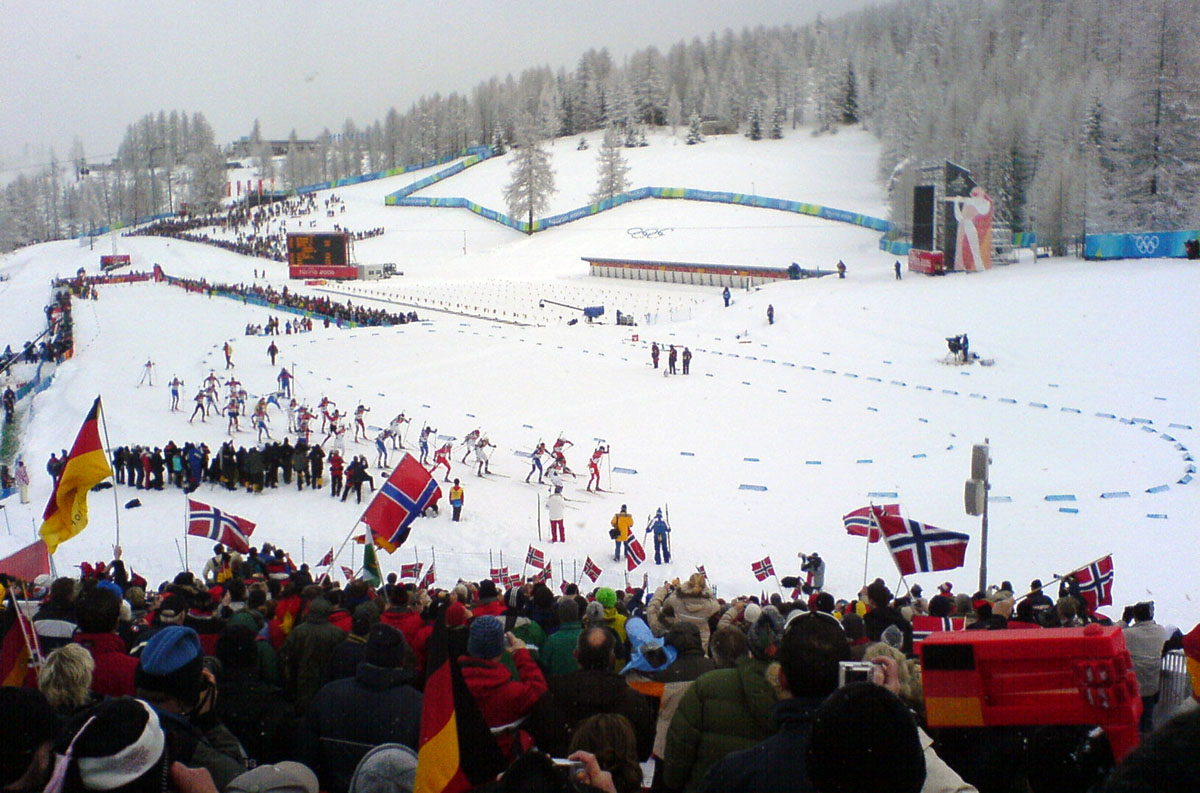
Cesana San Sicario hosted biathlon at the 2006 Winter Olympics in Turin.

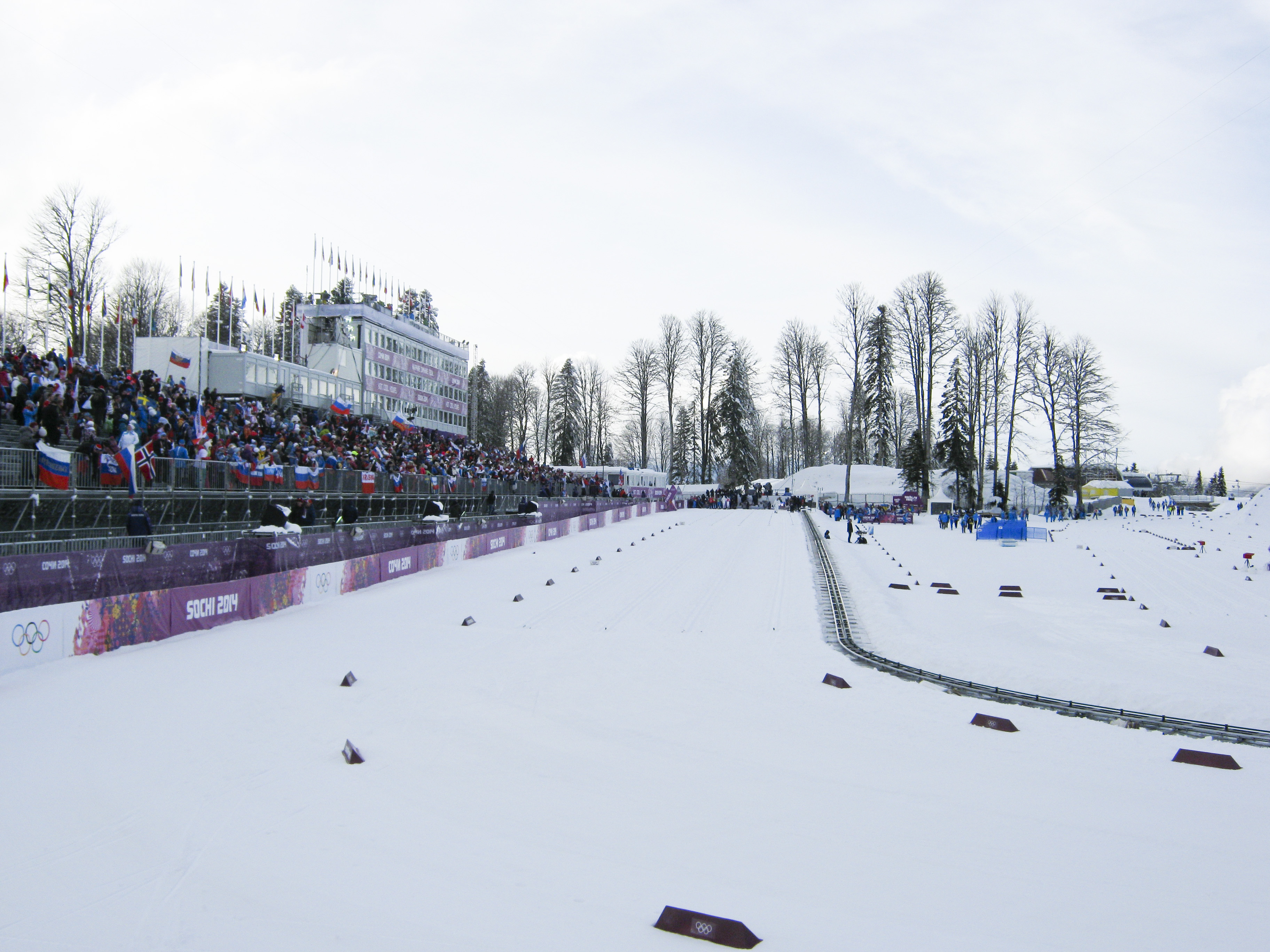
Laura Biathlon & Ski Complex hosted biathlon at the 2014 Winter Olympics in Sochi.

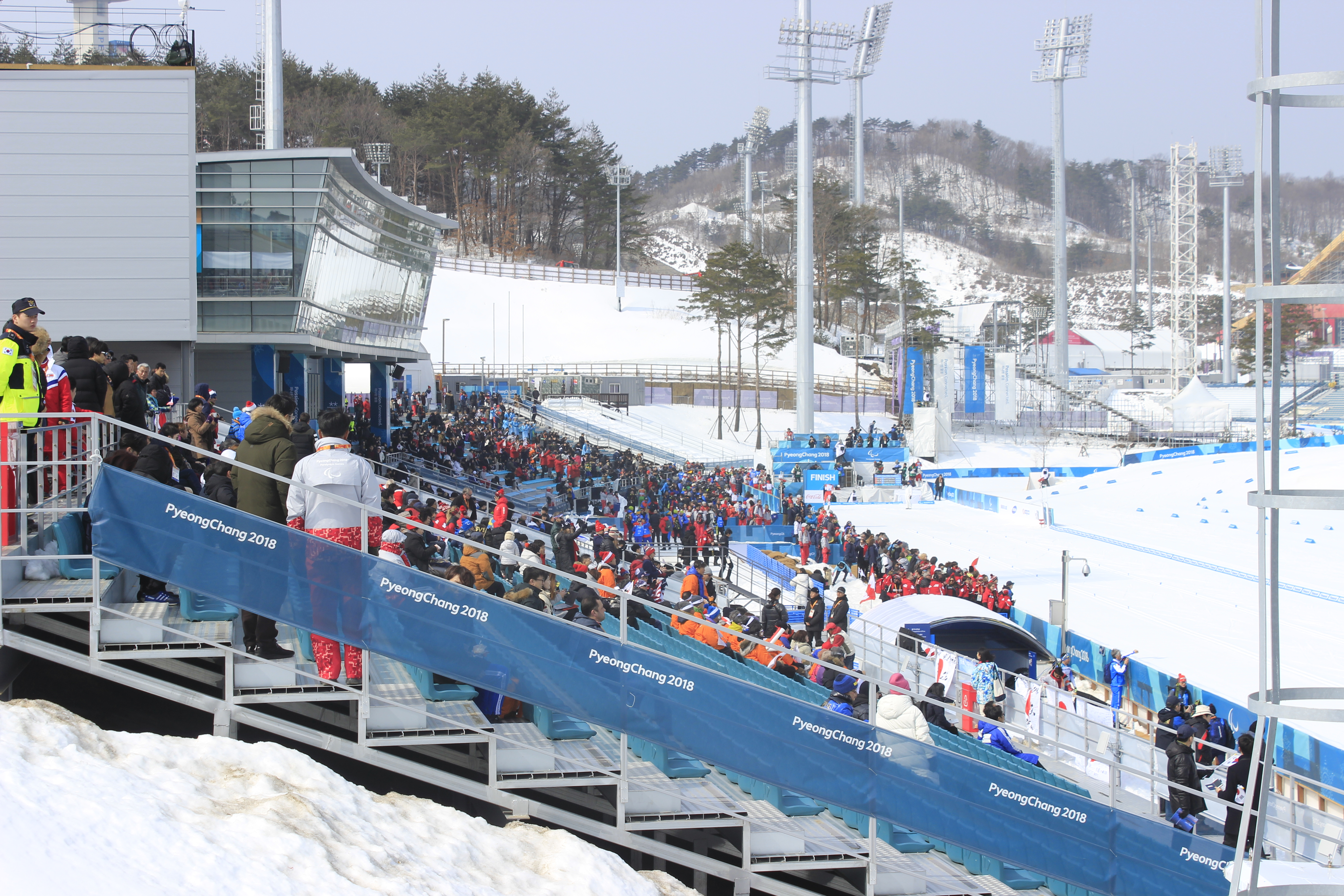
Alpensia Biathlon Centre hosted biathlon at the 2018 Winter Olympics in Pyeongchang.

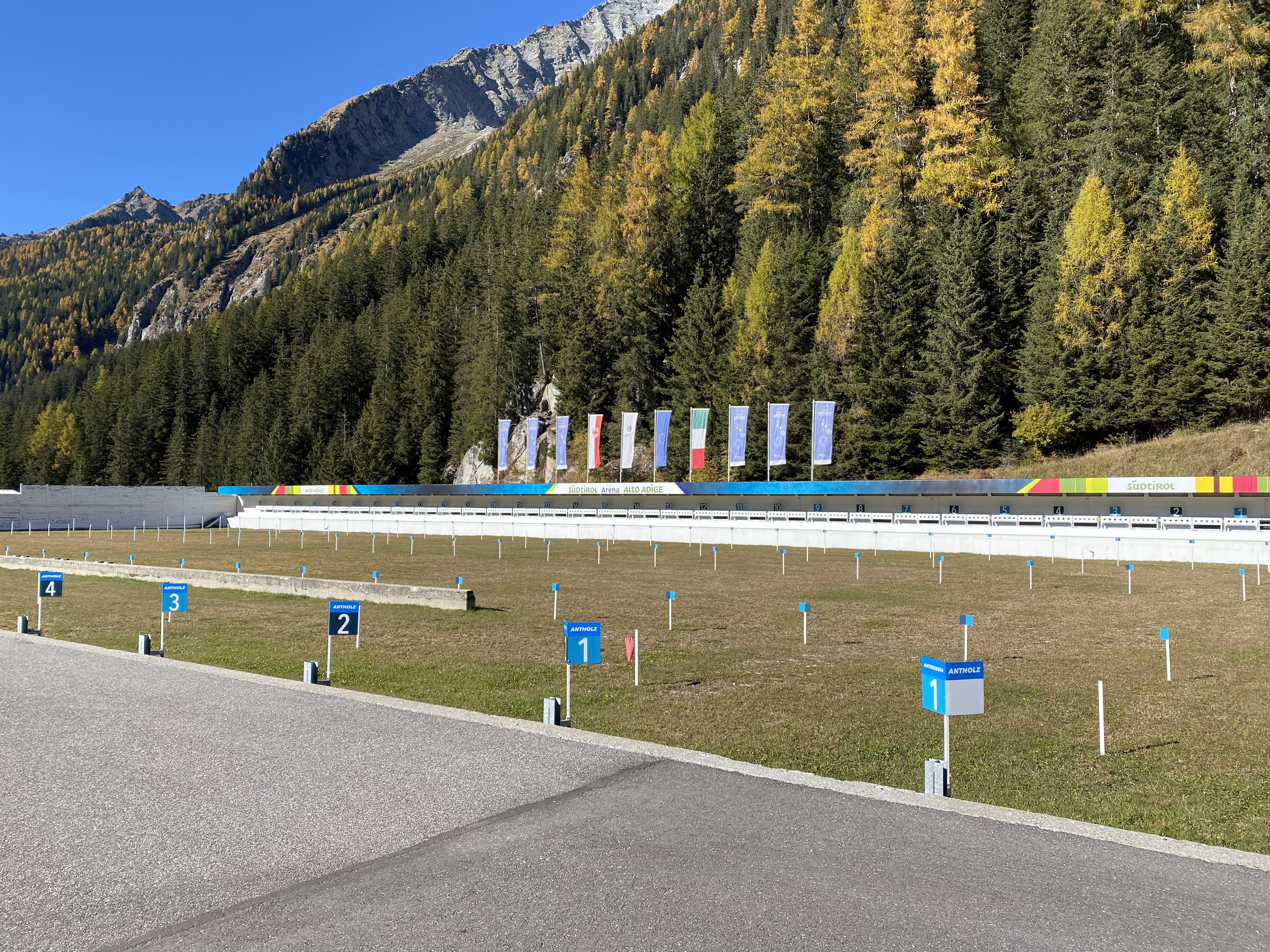
South Tyrol Arena hosted biathlon for the 2026 Winter Olympics in Milan and Cortina d’Ampezzo.

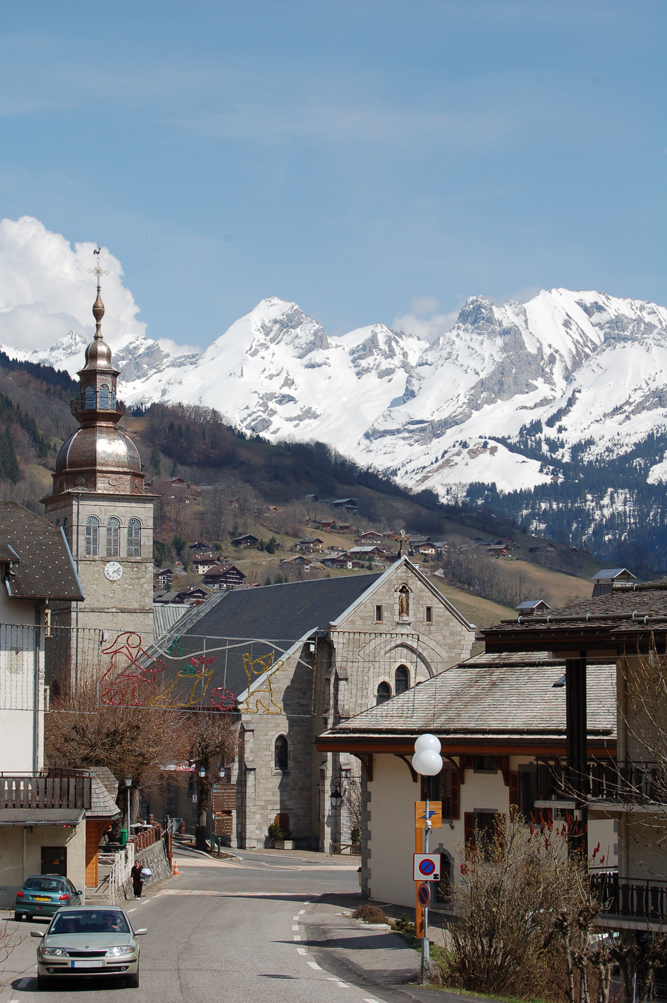
Le Grand-Bornand will host biathlon for the 2030 Winter Olympics in the French Alps.
