= Zdeněk Vítek =

Czech former biathlete (born 1977)

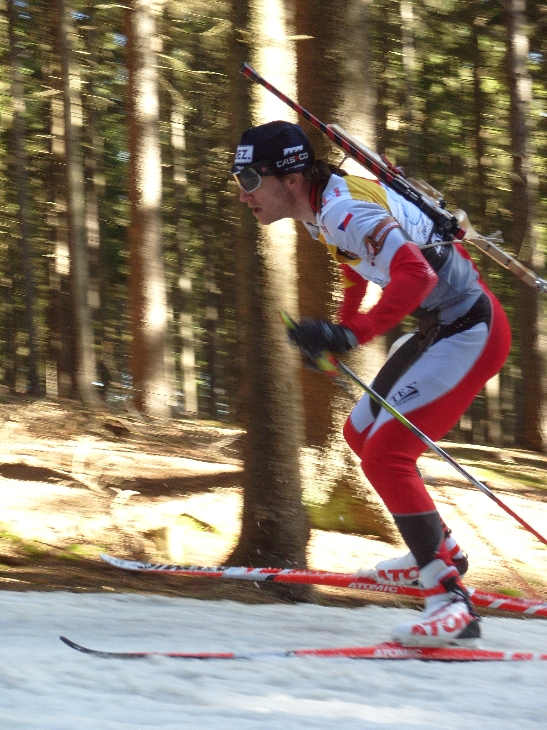

Personal information
- Born: 25 July 1977 (age 48) Vrchlabí, Czechoslovakia
- Height: 1.80 m (5 ft 11 in)

Sport

Professional information
- Sport: Biathlon
- Club: SKP Jablonec
- World Cup debut: 9 February 1997

Olympic Games
- Teams: 4 (1998, 2002, 2006, 2010)
- Medals: 0

World Championships
- Teams: 15 (1997, 1998, 1999, 2000, 2001, 2002, 2003, 2004, 2005, 2007, 2008, 2009, 2011, 2012, 2013)
- Medals: 1 (0 gold)

World Cup
- Seasons: 18 (1996/97–2013/14)
- Individual victories: 1
- All victories: 3
- Individual podiums: 5
- All podiums: 10
Medal record
Men's biathlon
Representing Czech Republic
World Championships
Bronze medal – third place	2003 Khanty-Mansiysk	10 km sprint

Zdeněk Vítek (Czech pronunciation: [ˈzdɛɲɛɡ ˈviːtɛk]; born 25 July 1977) is a Czech former biathlete. Vítek retired from the sport at the end of the 2013–14 season. In May 2014, he was named as the head coach for the Czech Republic's women's biathlon team. After four years in this role, in June 2018 Vitek became head coach of the Czech men's team.

== Biathlon results ==
All results are sourced from the International Biathlon Union.

=== Olympic Games ===
Event	Individual	Sprint	Pursuit	Mass start	Relay
(Japan) 1998 Nagano	—	51st	—N/a	—N/a	14th
(United States) 2002 Salt Lake City	57th	14th	17th	—N/a	5th
(Italy) 2006 Turin	22nd	10th	16th	22nd	6th
(Canada) 2010 Vancouver	67th	28th	38th	—	7th

*Pursuit was added as an event in 2002, with mass start being added in 2006.

=== World Championships ===
1 medal (1 bronze)

Event	Individual	Sprint	Pursuit	Mass start	Team	Relay	Mixed relay
(Slovakia) 1997 Brezno-Osrblie	—	—	—	—N/a	—	15th	—N/a
(Slovenia) 1998 Pokljuka	—N/a	—N/a	43rd	—N/a	19th	—N/a	—N/a
(Finland) 1999 Kontiolahti	50th	23rd	45th	—	—N/a	15th	—N/a
(Norway) 2000 Oslo Holmenkollen	23rd	36th	35th	—	—N/a	7th	—N/a
(Slovenia) 2001 Pokljuka	26th	23rd	10th	24th	—N/a	14th	—N/a
(Norway) 2002 Oslo Holmenkollen	—N/a	—N/a	—N/a	27th	—N/a	—N/a	—N/a
(Russia) 2003 Khanty-Mansiysk	—	Bronze	DNF	7th	—N/a	6th	—N/a
(Austria) 2005 Hochfilzen	—	62nd	—	—	—N/a	11th	—
(Slovenia) 2006 Pokljuka	—N/a	—N/a	—N/a	—N/a	—N/a	—N/a	17th
(Italy) 2007 Antholz-Anterselva	54th	—	—	—	—N/a	5th	8th
(Sweden) 2008 Östersund	7th	23rd	16th	—	—N/a	7th	—
(South Korea) 2009 Pyeongchang	29th	48th	28th	—	—N/a	10th	17th
(Russia) 2011 Khanty-Mansiysk	28th	40th	39th	—	—N/a	10th	11th
(Germany) 2012 Ruhpolding	—	64th	—	—	—N/a	9th	—
(Czech Republic) 2013 Nové Město	67th	24th	46th	—	—N/a	—	—

*During Olympic seasons competitions are only held for those events not included in the Olympic program.
**Team was removed as an event in 1998, and mass start was added in 1999 with the mixed relay being added in 2005.

=== Individual victories ===
1 victory (1 In)

Season	Date	Location	Discipline	Level
2000–01; 1 victory (1 In)	30 November 2000	(Italy) Antholz-Anterselva	20 km individual	Biathlon World Cup

*Results are from UIPMB and IBU races which include the Biathlon World Cup, Biathlon World Championships and the Winter Olympic Games.
