= Iwona Daniluk =

Polish biathlete (born 1973)

Personal information
- Nationality: Polish
- Born: 8 July 1973 (age 51); Kamienna Góra, Poland

Sport
- Sport: Biathlon

Iwona Daniluk (born 8 July 1973) is a Polish biathlete. She competed in the women's relay event at the 1998 Winter Olympics.
