= Matejka Mohorič =

Slovenian biathlete (born 1978)

Personal information
- Nationality: Slovenian
- Born: 17 July 1978 (age 46); Kranj, SFR Yugoslavia

Sport
- Sport: Biathlon

Matejka Mohorič (born 17 July 1978) is a Slovenian biathlete. She competed in the women's relay event at the 1998 Winter Olympics.
