= Biathlon World Championships 1997 =

Sports competition in Brezno-Osrblie, Slovakia

- Host city: Brezno-Osrblie
- Country: Slovakia
- Events: 10
- Opening: 1 February 1997
- Closing: 9 February 1997

The 32nd Biathlon World Championships were held in 1997 in Brezno-Osrblie, Slovakia. The pursuit races were contested for the first time in the world championships.

== Men's results ==
=== 20 km individual ===
Medal	Name	Nation	Penalties	Result
1st place, gold medalist(s)	Ricco Groß	GER		
2nd place, silver medalist(s)	Oleg Ryzhenkov	BLR		
3rd place, bronze medalist(s)	Ludwig Gredler	AUT		

=== 10 km sprint ===
Medal	Name	Nation	Penalties	Result
1st place, gold medalist(s)	Wilfried Pallhuber	ITA		
2nd place, silver medalist(s)	René Cattarinussi	ITA		
3rd place, bronze medalist(s)	Oleg Ryzhenkov	BLR		

=== 12.5 km pursuit ===
Medal	Name	Nation	Penalties	Result
1st place, gold medalist(s)	Viktor Maigourov	RUS		
2nd place, silver medalist(s)	Sergei Tarasov	RUS		
3rd place, bronze medalist(s)	Ole Einar Bjørndalen	NOR		

=== Team event ===
Medal	Name	Nation	Penalties	Result
1st place, gold medalist(s)	Belarus Vadim Sashurin; Oleg Ryzhenkov; Alexandr Popov; Petr Ivashko	BLR		
2nd place, silver medalist(s)	Germany Mark Kirchner; Frank Luck; Peter Sendel; Carsten Heymann	GER		
3rd place, bronze medalist(s)	Poland Wieslaw Ziemianin; Jan Ziemianin; Wojciech Kozub; Tomasz Sikora	POL		

=== 4 × 7.5 km relay ===
Medal	Name	Nation	Penalties	Result
1st place, gold medalist(s)	Germany Ricco Groß; Peter Sendel; Sven Fischer; Frank Luck	GER		
2nd place, silver medalist(s)	Norway Egil Gjelland; Jon Åge Tyldum; Dag Bjørndalen; Ole Einar Bjørndalen	NOR		
3rd place, bronze medalist(s)	Italy René Cattarinussi; Wilfried Pallhuber; Patrick Favre; Pieralberto Carrara	ITA		

== Women's results ==
=== 15 km individual ===
Medal	Name	Nation	Penalties	Result
1st place, gold medalist(s)	Magdalena Forsberg	SWE		
2nd place, silver medalist(s)	Olena Zubrilova	UKR		
3rd place, bronze medalist(s)	Ekaterina Dafovska	BUL		

=== 7.5 km sprint ===
Medal	Name	Nation	Penalties	Result
1st place, gold medalist(s)	Olga Romasko	RUS		
2nd place, silver medalist(s)	Olena Zubrilova	UKR		
3rd place, bronze medalist(s)	Magdalena Forsberg	SWE		

=== 10 km pursuit ===
Medal	Name	Nation	Penalties	Result
1st place, gold medalist(s)	Magdalena Forsberg	SWE		
2nd place, silver medalist(s)	Olena Zubrilova	UKR		
3rd place, bronze medalist(s)	Olga Romasko	RUS		

=== Team event ===
Medal	Name	Nation	Penalties	Result
1st place, gold medalist(s)	Norway Liv Grete Skjelbreid; Ann Elen Skjelbreid; Gunn Margit Andreassen; Annette Sikveland	NOR		
2nd place, silver medalist(s)	Russia Olga Melnik; Anna Volkova; Nadezhda Talanova; Olga Romasko	RUS		
3rd place, bronze medalist(s)	Ukraine Valentina Tserbe-Nessina; Tatyana Vodopyanova; Olena Petrova; Olena Zubrilova	UKR		

=== 4 × 7.5 km relay ===
Medal	Name	Nation	Penalties	Result
1st place, gold medalist(s)	Germany Uschi Disl; Simone Greiner-Petter-Memm; Katrin Apel; Petra Behle	GER		
2nd place, silver medalist(s)	Norway Ann Elen Skjelbreid; Annette Sikveland; Liv Grete Skjelbreid; Gunn Margit Andreassen	NOR		
3rd place, bronze medalist(s)	Russia Olga Melnik; Galina Kukleva; Nadezhda Talanova; Olga Romasko	RUS		

== Medal table ==
Place	Nation	1st place, gold medalist(s)	2nd place, silver medalist(s)	3rd place, bronze medalist(s)	Total
1	Germany	3	1	0	4
2	Russia	2	2	2	6
3	Sweden	2	0	1	3
4	Norway	1	2	1	4
5	Belarus	1	1	1	3
5	Italy	1	1	1	3
7	Ukraine	0	3	1	4
8	Austria	0	0	1	1
8	Bulgaria	0	0	1	1
8	Poland	0	0	1	1
