= René Cattarinussi =

Italian biathlete

Personal information
- Full name: René Cattarinussi
- Born: 12 April 1972 (age 54) Tolmezzo, Italy
- Height: 1.80 m (5 ft 11 in)

Sport

Professional information
- Sport: Biathlon
- Club: Guardia di Finanza
- World Cup debut: 9 December 1993

Olympic Games
- Teams: 2 (1998, 2002)
- Medals: 0

World Championships
- Teams: 8 (1995, 1996, 1997, 1998, 1999, 2000, 2001, 2003)
- Medals: 6 (0 gold)

World Cup
- Seasons: 10 (1993/94–2002/03)
- Individual victories: 2
- Individual podiums: 11
Medal record
Men's biathlon
Representing Italy
World Championships
Silver medal – second place	1997 Brezno-Osrblie	10 km sprint
Silver medal – second place	2001 Pokljuka	10 km sprint
Bronze medal – third place	1996 Ruhpolding	10 km sprint
Bronze medal – third place	1996 Ruhpolding	Team event
Bronze medal – third place	1997 Brezno-Osrblie	4 × 7.5 km relay
Bronze medal – third place	2000 Oslo Holmenkollen	10 km sprint

René Cattarinussi (born 12 April 1972) is a former Italian biathlete.

He won a bronze medal in the sprint at the 1996 World Championships in Ruhpolding. The following year, at the 1997 World Championships in Brezno-Osrblie, he conquered a silver medal in the sprint event and a bronze in the relay. He also won a bronze and a silver medal in the sprint distance at the 2000 World Championships in Oslo and at the 2001 World Championships in Pokljuka.

Cattarinussi retired as a biathlete after the 2002–03 season.

== Biathlon results ==
All results are sourced from the International Biathlon Union.

=== Olympic Games ===
Event	Individual	Sprint	Pursuit	Relay
(Japan) 1998 Nagano	21st	52nd	—N/a	9th
(United States) 2002 Salt Lake City	21st	22nd	20th	16th

*Pursuit was added as an event in 2002.

=== World Championships ===
6 medals (2 silver, 4 bronze)

Event	Individual	Sprint	Pursuit	Mass start	Team	Relay
(Italy) 1995 Antholz-Anterselva	—	43rd	—N/a	—N/a	—	—
(Germany) 1996 Ruhpolding	—	Bronze	—N/a	—N/a	Bronze	10th
(Slovakia) 1997 Brezno-Osrblie	42nd	Silver	10th	—N/a	—	Bronze
(Slovenia) 1998 Pokljuka	—N/a	—N/a	10th	—N/a	6th	—N/a
(Finland) 1999 Kontiolahti	8th	30th	12th	10th	—N/a	8th
(Norway) 2000 Oslo Holmenkollen	43rd	Bronze	8th	DNF	—N/a	5th
(Slovenia) 2001 Pokljuka	21st	Silver	18th	10th	—N/a	10th
(Russia) 2003 Khanty-Mansiysk	19th	7th	16th	26th	—N/a	18th

*During Olympic seasons competitions are only held for those events not included in the Olympic program.
**Team was removed as an event in 1998, and pursuit was added in 1997 with mass start being added in 1999.

=== Individual victories ===
2 victories (1 Sp, 1 MS)

Season	Date	Location	Discipline	Level
1998–99; 1 victory (1 Sp)	22 January 1999	(Italy) Antholz-Anterselva	10 km sprint	Biathlon World Cup
1999–2000; 1 victory (1 MS)	19 March 2000	(Russia) Khanty-Mansiysk	15 km mass start	Biathlon World Cup

*Results are from UIPMB and IBU races which include the Biathlon World Cup, Biathlon World Championships and the Winter Olympic Games.

Further notable results

- 1995: 2nd, Italian championships of biathlon, sprint
- 1996: 2nd, Italian championships of biathlon, sprint
- 1997:
  - 1st, Italian championships of biathlon
  - 3rd, Italian championships of biathlon, sprint
- 1998:
  - 1st, Italian championships of biathlon, pursuit
  - 3rd, Italian championships of biathlon, sprint
- 1999:
  - 1st, Italian championships of biathlon, sprint
  - 2nd, Italian championships of biathlon
- 2000:
  - 1st, Italian championships of biathlon, sprint
  - 2nd, Italian championships of biathlon, pursuit
- 2001:
  - 1st, Italian championships of biathlon, pursuit
  - 3rd, Italian championships of biathlon, sprint
- 2002: 1st, Italian championships of biathlon, sprint
- 2003:
  - 1st, Italian championships of biathlon, sprint
  - 1st, Italian championships of biathlon, pursuit
