= Olga Melnik =

Russian biathlete (born 1974)

Medal record

Representing Russia

Women's biathlon

Olympic Games
Silver medal – second place	1998 Nagano	4 x 7.5 km relay

World Championships
Silver medal – second place	1996 Ruhpolding	15 km
Silver medal – second place	1997 Brezno	Team
Bronze medal – third place	1997 Brezno	4 x 7.5 km relay

Olga Ivanovna Melnik (Russian: Ольга Ивановна Мельник; born 12 May 1974 in Sovetsky, Khanty-Mansi Autonomous Okrug) is a Russian biathlete. At the 1998 Winter Olympics in Nagano, she received a silver medal with the Russian relay team, which consisted of herself, Galina Koukleva, Albina Akhatova and Olga Romasko.
