= Carsten Heymann =

German biathlete (born 1972)

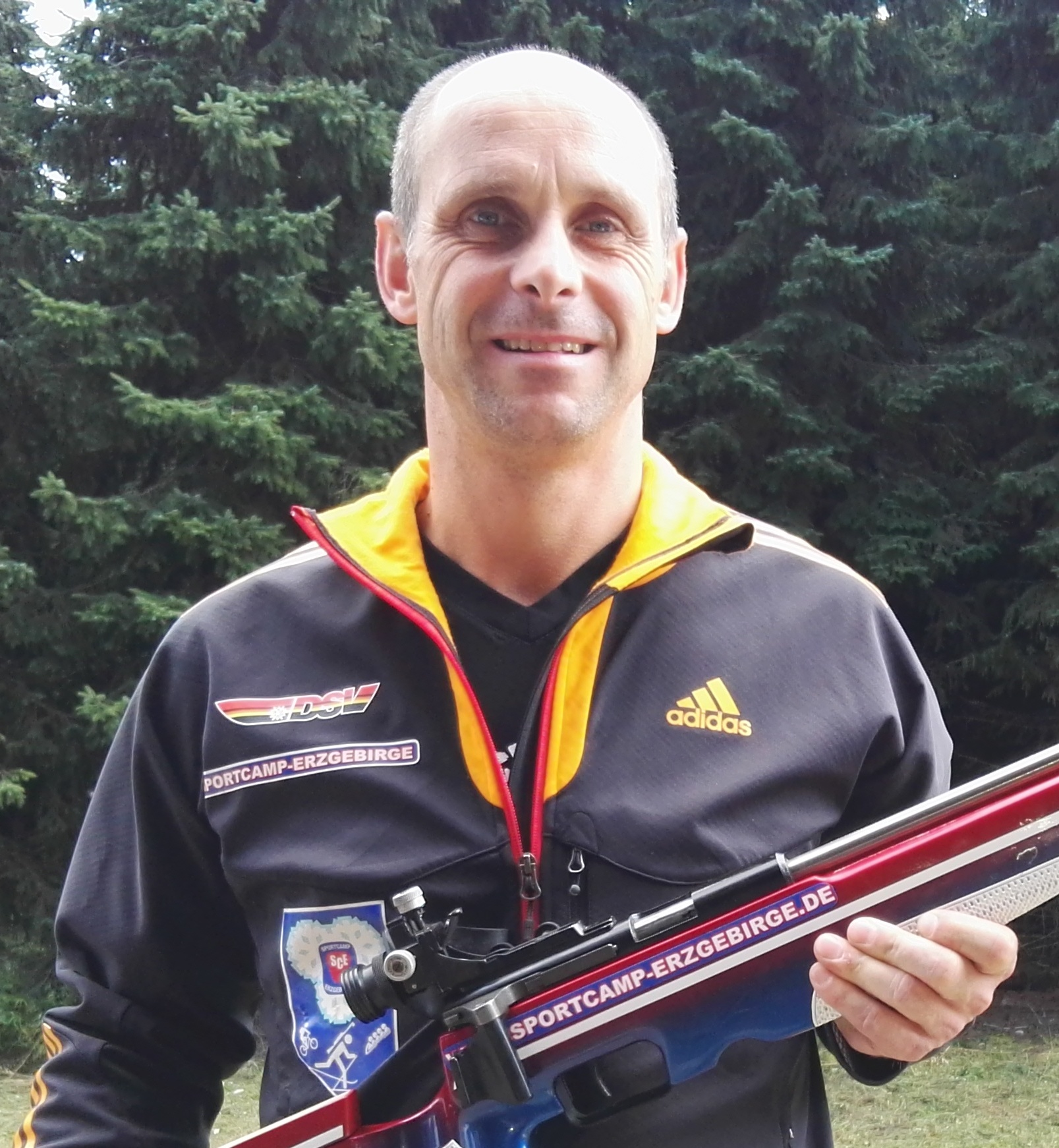
- Carsten Heymann in 2016

Personal information
- Nationality: German
- Born: 7 January 1972 (age 54) Sebnitz, East Germany

Sport
- Sport: Biathlon

Professional information
- World Cup debut: 19 January 1995

Olympic Games
- Teams: 1 (1998)

World Championships
- Teams: 4 (1995, 1997, 1998, 2001)
- Medals: 2

World Cup
- Seasons: 8 (1994/95, 1996/97-2001/02, 2003/04)
- All victories: 2
- Individual podiums: 6
- All podiums: 12
Medal record
Men's biathlon
Representing Germany
World Championships
Silver medal – second place	1997 Brezno-Osrblie	Team event
Silver medal – second place	1998 Hochfilzen	Team event

Carsten Heymann (born 7 January 1972) is a German former biathlete. He competed in the men's sprint event at the 1998 Winter Olympics.

== Career ==
His greatest achievements were winning silver medals with the German national team at the Biathlon World Championships in 1997 and 1998.

In 2005, he ended his career because he saw no realistic chance of qualifying for the 2006 Winter Olympics in Turin. His coach was Klaus Siebert.

== Biathlon results ==
All results are sourced from the International Biathlon Union.

=== Olympic Games ===
Event	Individual	Sprint	Relay
(Japan) 1998 Nagano	—	34th	—

=== World Championships ===
2 medals (2 silver)

Event	Individual	Sprint	Pursuit	Mass start	Team	Relay
(Italy) 1995 Antholz-Anterselva	—	—	—N/a	—N/a	14th	—
(Slovakia) 1997 Brezno-Osrblie	25th	—	—	—N/a	Silver	—
(Austria) 1998 Hochfilzen	—N/a	—N/a	—	—N/a	Silver	—N/a
(Slovenia) 2001 Pokljuka	—	25th	25th	11th	—N/a	—

*During Olympic seasons competitions are only held for those events not included in the Olympic program.
**Team was removed as an event in 1998, and pursuit was added in 1997 with mass start being added in 1999.
