= Dag Bjørndalen =

Norwegian biathlete (born 1970)

Medal record

Men's biathlon

Representing Norway

Olympic Games
Silver medal – second place	1998 Nagano	4 × 7.5 km relay

World Championships
Gold medal – first place	1995 Antholz-Anterselva	Team event
Silver medal – second place	1997 Brezno-Osrblie	4 × 7.5 km relay
Bronze medal – third place	1999 Kontiolahti	4 × 7.5 km relay

Dag Bjørndalen (born 2 April 1970) is a former Norwegian biathlete. He is the older brother of Ole Einar Bjørndalen. His biggest triumph as a biathlete is the silver medal he won in the relay in the 1998 Olympics in Nagano (together with his brother Ole Einar, Halvard Hanevold and Egil Gjelland). He was also part of the team that won the team event in the 1995 World Championships.
