= Martina Zellner =

German biathlete (born 1974)

Medal record

Women's biathlon

Representing Germany

Olympic Games
Gold medal – first place	1998 Nagano	4 × 7.5 km relay

World Championships
Gold medal – first place	1999 Kontiolahti	7.5 km sprint
Gold medal – first place	1999 Kontiolahti	4 × 7.5 km relay
Silver medal – second place	2000 Oslo	4 × 7.5 km relay
Bronze medal – third place	2000 Oslo	7.5 km sprint
Bronze medal – third place	1998 Pokljuka	10 km pursuit
Bronze medal – third place	1999 Kontiolahti	10 km pursuit

Martina Zellner-Seidl (born 26 February 1974 in Traunstein) is a former German biathlete. By the end of her career she had won one Olympic gold and six world championship medals, (2 gold, 1 silver and 3 bronze). In the World Cup she achieved 14 podium places with three victories. The best overall placing she achieved was in the 1997/98 season when she finished third.

== Achievements ==
- Winter Olympics
- 1998 Nagano: Gold medal in the relay
- World Championships
  - 1998 Pokljuka: Bronze medal in the pursuit
  - 1999 Kontiolahti: Gold medal in the sprint and in the relay, bronze in the pursuit
  - 2000 Oslo: Silver medal in the relay and bronze in the sprint
- World Cup victories

3 (1 sprint, 1 pursuit and 1 mass-start)
