= Annette Sikveland =

Norwegian biathlete (born 1972)

Medal record

Women's biathlon

Representing Norway

Olympic Games
Bronze medal – third place	1998 Nagano	4 × 7.5 km relay

World Championships
Gold medal – first place	1995 Antholz-Anterselva	Team event
Gold medal – first place	1997 Brezno-Osrblie	Team event
Silver medal – second place	1994 Canmore	Team event
Silver medal – second place	1997 Brezno-Osrblie	4 × 7.5 km relay
Silver medal – second place	1998 Pokljuka	Team event
Bronze medal – third place	1995 Antholz-Anterselva	4 × 7.5 km relay

Annette Sikveland (born 25 April 1972 in Stavanger) is a former Norwegian biathlete. During her career as biathlete Sikveland won three relay medals, bronze at the World Championships 1995 in Antholz, silver at the World Championships 1997 in Brezno-Osrblie and bronze at the 1998 Winter Olympics in Nagano. Her best individual olympic placing is 8th from the 15 km at the same Olympics. She retired as biathlete after that Olympics. She lives today in the German town of Schmalkalden. For a period, she lived together with the German biathlete Sven Fischer.
