= Anna Sprung =

Russian biathlete

Personal information
- Full name: Anna Filippovna Volkova
- Nationality: Russian
- Born: 16 May 1975 (age 49)

Sport
- Sport: Biathlon

Anna Sprung (born 16 May 1975) is a Russian biathlete. She competed in the women's sprint event at the 1998 Winter Olympics. After the winter Olympics, she competed for Austria.
