= Nozawa Onsen Snow Resort =

Ski resort in Japan

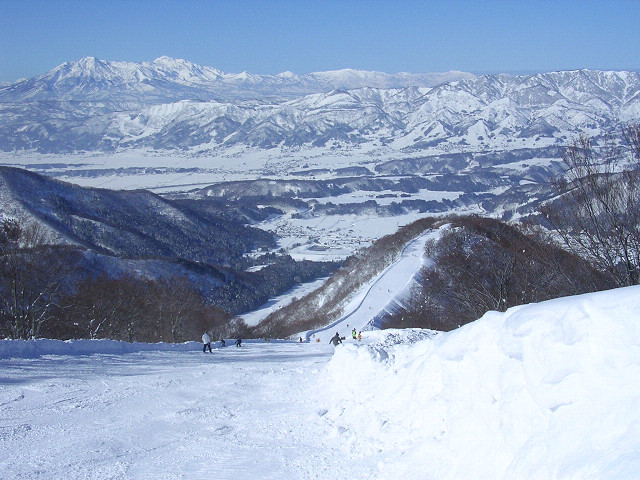
- Interactive map of Nozawa Onsen Snow Resort
- Location: Nozawaonsen, Nagano, Japan
- Coordinates: 36.920031°N 138.451976°E
- Vertical: 1,085 m (3,560 ft)
- Top elevation: 1,650 m (5,413 ft)
- Base elevation: 565 m (1,854 ft)
- Skiable area: 297 ha (733.9 acres)
- Trails: 36
- Longest run: 10,000 m (33,000 ft)
- Lift system: 20 (2 gondola lifts, 6 quad chairlifts, 3 triple chairlifts, 8 pair chairlifts, and 1 surface lift)
- Website: Nozawa Onsen Snow Resort

Nozawa Onsen Snow Resort (野沢温泉スキー場, Nozawa Onsen Sukī-jō) is a skiing venue located in Nozawaonsen, Nagano, Japan.

== Background ==
Nozawa Onsen Village is located at the foot of the ski resort, which spans across three main areas. The resort is a large ski area that opened over seventy years ago.

Covering 297 hectares (730 acres), the southern part of the resort was used for biathlon competitions at the 1998 Winter Olympics. The Olympic venue consisted of two trails each 4 km (2.5 mi) in length along with a firing range consisting of 30 stations.
