= Olga Romasko =

Russian biathlete

Medal record

Women's biathlon

Representing Russia

Olympic Games
Silver medal – second place	1998 Nagano	4 × 7.5 km relay

World Championships
Gold medal – first place	1996 Ruhpolding	7.5 km sprint
Gold medal – first place	1997 Brezno-Osrblie	7.5 km sprint
Gold medal – first place	1998 Hochfilzen	Team event
Silver medal – second place	1997 Brezno-Osrblie	Team event
Silver medal – second place	1999 Kontiolahti	4 × 7.5 km relay
Bronze medal – third place	1997 Brezno-Osrblie	10 km pursuit
Bronze medal – third place	1997 Brezno-Osrblie	4 × 7.5 km relay

Olga Vladimirovna Romasko (Russian: Ольга Владимировна Ромасько) (born 18 April 1968 in Borodino, Krasnoyarsk Krai) is a former Russian biathlete. She began with biathlon in 1993. Both in 1996 and 1997, she became world champion in the 7.5 km sprint event. Romasko also won a bronze medal both in the pursuit and on the relay in 1997. At the 1998 Winter Olympics in Nagano, she won a silver medal with the Russian relay team. Over the course of her career she had four individual world cup victories.
