= Gunn Margit Andreassen =

Norwegian biathlete

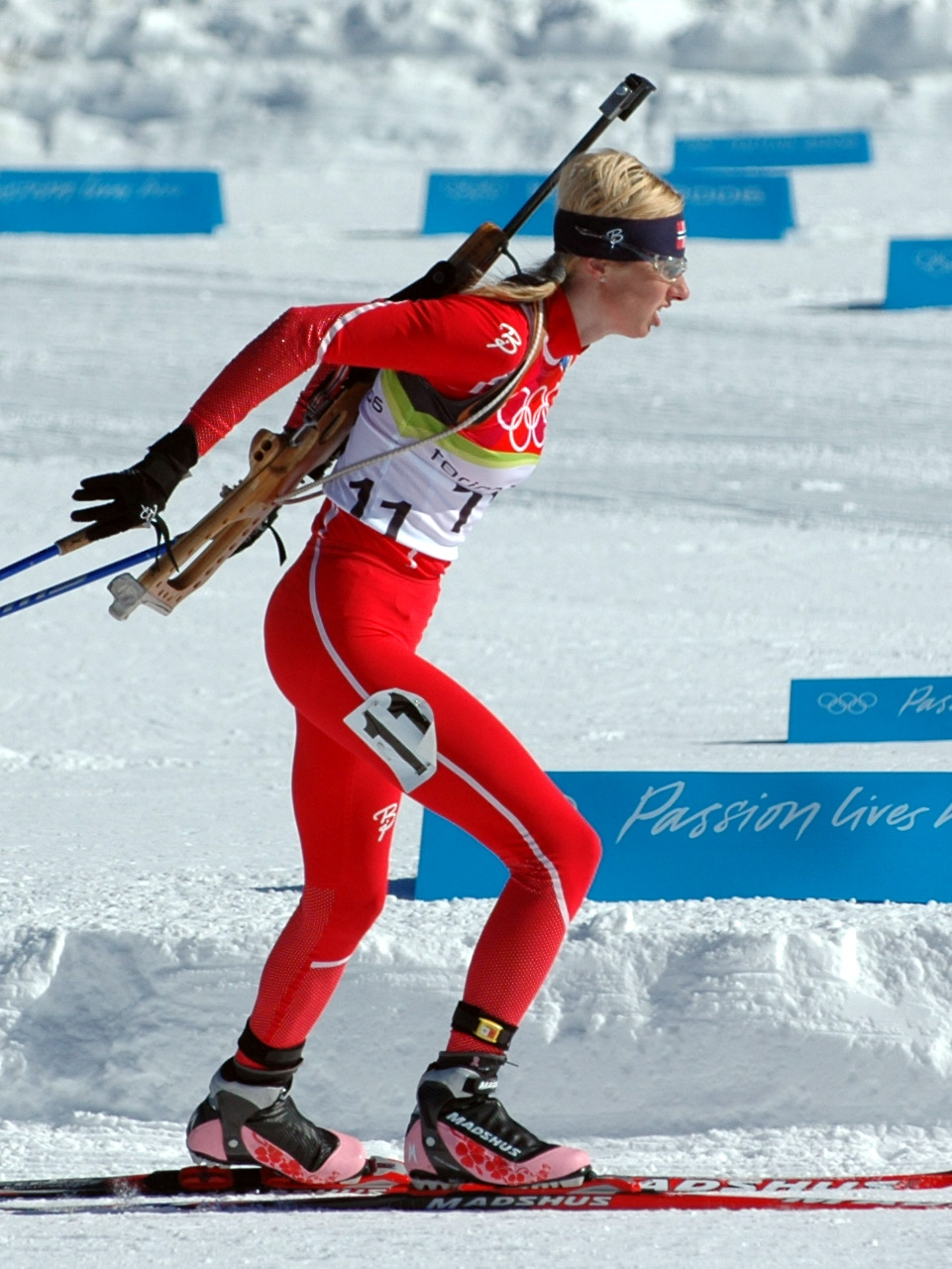

Medal record

Women's biathlon

Representing Norway

Olympic Games
Silver medal – second place	2002 Salt Lake City	4 × 7.5 km relay
Bronze medal – third place	1998 Nagano	4 × 7.5 km relay

World Championships
Gold medal – first place	1995 Antholz-Anterselva	Team event
Gold medal – first place	1997 Brezno-Osrblie	Team event
Gold medal – first place	2004 Oberhof	4 × 6 km relay
Silver medal – second place	1997 Brezno-Osrblie	4 × 7.5 km relay
Bronze medal – third place	1995 Antholz-Anterselva	4 × 7.5 km relay
Bronze medal – third place	2003 Khanty-Mansiysk	15 km individual

Gunn Margit Aas Andreassen (born 23 July 1973 in Kristiansand) is a former Norwegian biathlete.

== Biathlon career ==
She won two Olympic medals, bronze in Nagano 1998 and silver in Salt Lake City 2002, both in the relay. From the World Championships she has the following results:

- 1995 - 1.pl (Team)
- 1995 - 3.pl (Relay)
- 1997 - 1.pl (Team)
- 1997 - 2.pl (Relay)
- 2004 - 1.pl (Relay)

In cross-country skiing she participated in one World Cup race, in which she finished 46th, in Beitostølen in November 2003. She represented Ringkollen SK, the club of her husband, in this sport.

== Personal life ==
She is a daughter of Ivar Andreassen and niece of Reidar Andreassen. Both were skiers and runners. She was born in Kristiansand, but lived in Birkenes Municipality and represented Birkenes IL. She lives with fellow former biathlete, Frode Andresen, and they have three sons together, David, who was born around Christmas 2004 - now deceased, Nicolai, who was born in 2008 and Elias, who was born in August 2010.
