= Galina Kukleva =

Russian biathlete (1972–2026)

Personal information
- Born: 21 November 1972 Ishimbay, Bashkir ASSR, Russian SFSR, USSR
- Died: 14 July 2026 (aged 53) Tyumen, Russia
- Height: 176 cm (5 ft 9 in)
- Weight: 66 kg (146 lb)

Sport
- Sport: Biathlon
- Club: Rosneft Sportsclub
Medal record
Representing Russia
Olympic Games
Gold medal – first place	1998 Nagano	7.5 km sprint
Silver medal – second place	1998 Nagano	4 × 7.5 km relay
Bronze medal – third place	2002 Salt Lake City	4 × 7.5 km relay
World Championships
Gold medal – first place	2000 Oslo	4 × 7.5 km relay
Gold medal – first place	2001 Pokljuka	4 × 7.5 km relay
Gold medal – first place	2003 Khanty-Mansiysk	4 × 6 km relay
Silver medal – second place	1999 Kontiolahti	4 × 7.5 km relay
Silver medal – second place	2000 Oslo	12.5 km mass start
Bronze medal – third place	1997 Brezno-Osrblie	4 × 7.5 km relay

Galina Alekseyevna Kukleva (Russian: Галина Алексеевна Куклева, 21 November 1972 – 14 July 2026) was a Russian biathlete. At the 1998 Winter Olympics she won a gold medal in the 7.5 km sprint, and was a part of the team that won a silver medal in the relay. Four years later at the 2002 Winter Olympics she was a part of the team that won a bronze medal. In the World Championships she earned a silver medal in the mass start from 2000, in addition to five relay medals (gold in 2000, 2001 and 2003, silver in 1999 and bronze in 1997). She won 9 world cup competitions by the end of her career.

Kukleva died of cancer in Tyumen, on 14 July 2026, at the age of 53.

== Sources ==
- Evans, Hilary; Gjerde, Arild; Heijmans, Jeroen; Mallon, Bill; et al. "Galina Kukleva". Olympics at Sports-Reference.com. Sports Reference LLC. Archived from the original on 5 March 2016.
- Galina Kukleva at IBU BiathlonWorld.com
- Galina Kukleva at IBU BiathlonResults.com
