= Tetyana Vodopyanova =

Ukrainian biathlete (born 1973)

Olympic medal record

Women's biathlon

Representing Ukraine

World Championships
Silver medal – second place	1996 Ruhpolding	Team event
Bronze medal – third place	1996 Rupholding	4 x 7.5 km relay
Bronze medal – third place	1997 Brezno-Osrblie	Team event
Bronze medal – third place	2000 Oslo	4 × 7.5 km relay
Bronze medal – third place	2001 Pokljuka	4 × 7.5 km relay

European Championships
Silver medal – second place	1995 Le Grand-Bornand	3 × 6 km relay
Silver medal – second place	1996 Ridnaun	3 × 6 km relay

Tetyana Vodopyanova (born January 11, 1973, in Kyiv) is a former Ukrainian biathlete. She is a "Distinguished Master of Sports" at the Institute of Physical Education and Wellness of the Volyn National University.

== Career ==
- World Championships
- 1996 - bronze medal on the relay
- 2000 - bronze medal on the relay
- 2001 - bronze medal on the relay
