= Egil Gjelland =

Norwegian biathlete (born 1973)

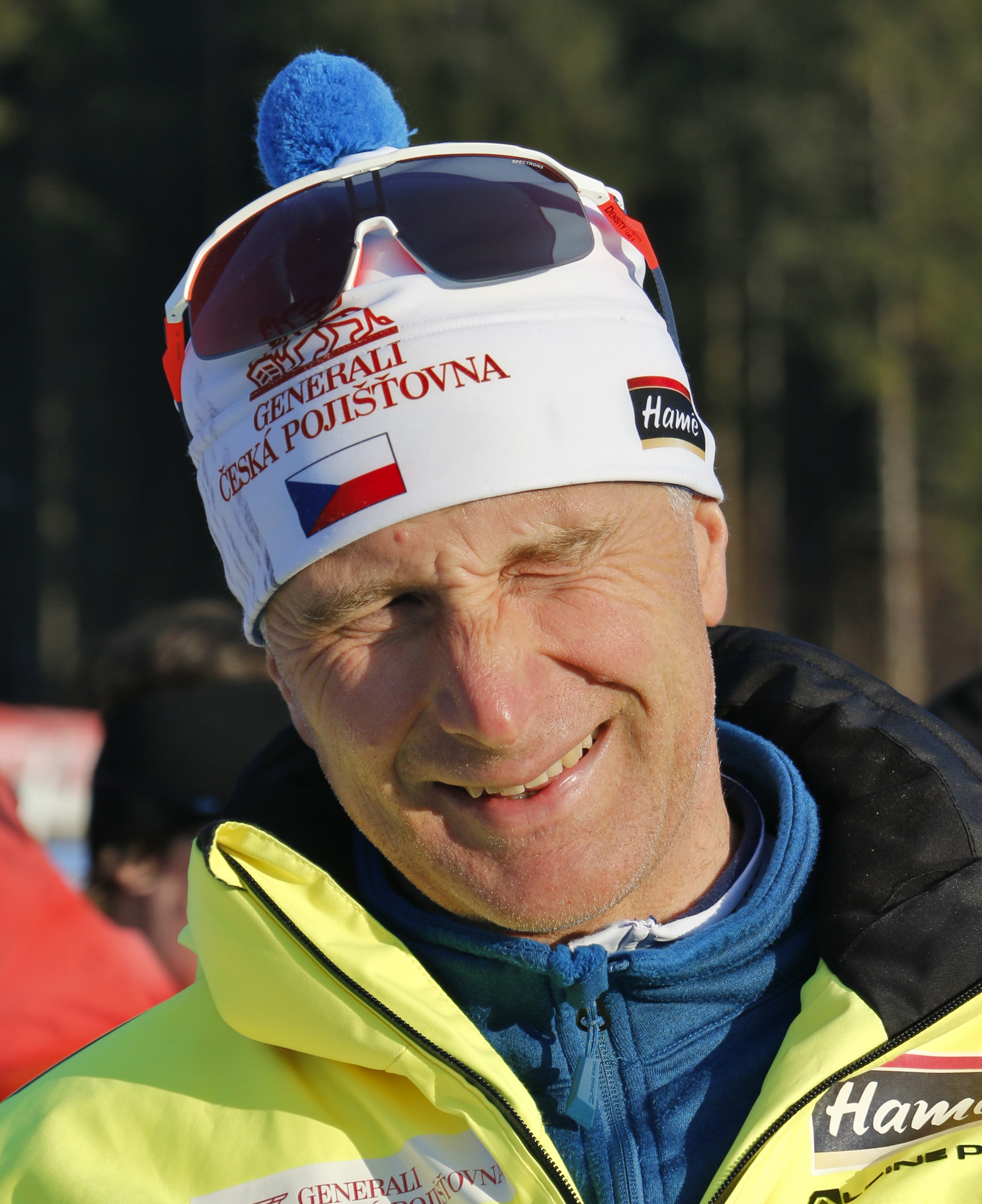

Personal information
- Full name: Egil Gjelland
- Born: 12 November 1973 (age 52) Voss Municipality, Hordaland, Norway
- Height: 1.86 m (6 ft 1 in)

Sport

Professional information
- Sport: Biathlon
- Club: Voss Skiskyttarlag
- World Cup debut: 7 December 1995

Olympic Games
- Teams: 2 (1998, 2002)
- Medals: 2 (1 gold)

World Championships
- Teams: 9 (1996, 1997, 1998, 2000, 2001, 2002, 2003, 2004, 2005)
- Medals: 6 (2 gold)

World Cup
- Seasons: 12 (1995/96–2006/07)
- Individual victories: 1
- All victories: 16
- Individual podiums: 7
- All podiums: 47
Medal record
Men's biathlon
Representing Norway
Olympic Games
Gold medal – first place	2002 Salt Lake City	4 × 7.5 km relay
Silver medal – second place	1998 Nagano	4 × 7.5 km relay
World Championships
Gold medal – first place	1998 Hochfilzen	Team event
Gold medal – first place	2005 Hochfilzen	4 × 7.5 km relay
Silver medal – second place	1997 Brezno-Osrblie	4 × 7.5 km relay
Silver medal – second place	2000 Lahti	4 × 7.5 km relay
Silver medal – second place	2004 Oberhof	4 × 7.5 km relay
Bronze medal – third place	2001 Pokljuka	4 × 7.5 km relay

Egil Gjelland (born 12 November 1973) is a Norwegian former biathlete. He is olympic champion in the biathlon relay from the 2002 Winter Olympics in Salt Lake City.

== Career ==
Egil Gjelland grew up in Voss Municipality, the home of many world class biathletes, and started doing biathlon at the age of 15. He first entered the national team in 1996.

Gjelland's strength is in shooting. His greatest triumphs have come on Norway's relay team, where he was a regular feature for several years, thanks to his ability to keep his cool and deliver faultless shooting. In the 2002 Olympics in Salt Lake City, he won the gold medal on the relay, together with Ole Einar Bjørndalen, Halvard Hanevold and Frode Andresen. In the Biathlon World Championship 2005 in Hochfilzen, Gjelland again helped win the relay, Norway's first relay-gold in the world championships for 38 years. He won one race in the Biathlon World Cup, the pursuit in Östersund on 17 December 2004.

Egil Gjelland is a carpenter by trade. He married fellow biathlete Ann-Elen Skjelbreid in 2002. They have one daughter, Kristi (b. 2004). They live on her home farm, Skjelbreid, in Bjørnafjorden Municipality in western Norway.

Since retiring from competition Gjelland has worked as a coach with the Norwegian biathlon team, and he was appointed as head coach for the Norwegian men's biathlon squad ahead of the 2014–15 season, having previously performed the equivalent role for the Norwegian women's team. In 2018 he was announced as head coach of the Czech women's biathlon team, becoming the first foreign coach to be employed by the Czech Biathlon Association alongside countryman and assistant coach to the men's team Anders Magnus Bratli.

== Biathlon results ==
All results are sourced from the International Biathlon Union.

=== Olympic Games ===
2 medals (1 gold, 1 silver)

Event	Individual	Sprint	Pursuit	Relay
(Japan) 1998 Nagano	—	13th	—N/a	Silver
(United States) 2002 Salt Lake City	16th	24th	15th	Gold

*Pursuit was added as an event in 2002.

=== World Championships ===
6 medals (2 gold, 3 silver, 1 bronze)

Event	Individual	Sprint	Pursuit	Mass start	Team	Relay	Mixed relay
(Germany) 1996 Ruhpolding	36th	—	—N/a	—N/a	—	4th	—N/a
(Slovakia) 1997 Brezno-Osrblie	—	—	—	—N/a	4th	Silver	—N/a
(Slovenia) 1998 Pokljuka	—N/a	—N/a	36th	—N/a	Gold	—N/a	—N/a
(Norway) 2000 Oslo Holmenkollen	—	28th	22nd	21st	—N/a	Silver	—N/a
(Slovenia) 2001 Pokljuka	14th	4th	5th	15th	—N/a	Bronze	—N/a
(Norway) 2002 Oslo Holmenkollen	—N/a	—N/a	—N/a	22nd	—N/a	—N/a	—N/a
(Russia) 2003 Khanty-Mansiysk	6th	14th	22nd	19th	—N/a	4th	—N/a
(Germany) 2004 Oberhof	35th	—	—	26th	—N/a	Silver	—N/a
(Austria) 2005 Hochfilzen	17th	12th	22nd	28th	—N/a	Gold	—

*During Olympic seasons competitions are only held for those events not included in the Olympic program.
**Team was removed as an event in 1998, and pursuit was added in 1997 with mass start being added in 1999 and the mixed relay in 2005.

=== Individual victories ===
1 victory (1 Pu)

Season	Date	Location	Discipline	Level
2004–05; 1 victory (1 Pu)	17 December 2004	(Sweden) Östersund	12.5 km pursuit	Biathlon World Cup

*Results are from UIPMB and IBU races which include the Biathlon World Cup, Biathlon World Championships and the Winter Olympic Games.
