= Biathlon at the 1998 Winter Olympics =

Biathlon at the XVIII Olympic Winter Games
- Venue: Nozawa Onsen
- Dates: 9–21 February
- No. of events: 6
- Competitors: 183 from 32 nations

Biathlon at the 1998 Winter Olympics consisted of six biathlon events. They were held at Nozawa Onsen. The events began on 9 February and ended on 21 February 1998.

== Medal summary ==
Eight nations won medals in biathlon, with Norway leading the medal table, thanks to five medals, 2 gold, the same as Germany. Uschi Disl was the only individual to win three medals, one of each type. Ole Einar Bjørndalen and Halvard Hanevold led the men's table, with one gold and one silver each.

=== Medal table ===
Rank	Nation	Gold	Silver	Bronze	Total
1	Norway	2	2	1	5
2	Germany	2	1	2	5
3	Russia	1	1	1	3
4	Bulgaria	1	0	0	1
5	Italy	0	1	0	1
5	Ukraine	0	1	0	1
7	Belarus	0	0	1	1
7	Finland	0	0	1	1
Totals (8 entries)		6	6	6	18

=== Men's events ===
Event	Gold		Silver		Bronze	
Individual	Halvard Hanevold; Norway	56:16.4	Pieralberto Carrara; Italy	56:21.9	Alexei Aidarov; Belarus	56:46.5
Sprint	Ole Einar Bjørndalen; Norway	27:16.2	Frode Andresen; Norway	28:17.8	Ville Räikkönen; Finland	28:21.7
Relay	Germany; Ricco Groß; Peter Sendel; Sven Fischer; Frank Luck	1:21:36.2	Norway; Egil Gjelland; Halvard Hanevold; Dag Bjørndalen; Ole Einar Bjørndalen	1:21:56.3	Russia; Pavel Muslimov; Vladimir Drachev; Sergei Tarasov; Viktor Maigourov	1:22:19.3

=== Women's events ===
Event	Gold		Silver		Bronze	
Individual	Ekaterina Dafovska; Bulgaria	54:52.0	Olena Petrova; Ukraine	55:09.8	Uschi Disl; Germany	55:17.9
Sprint	Galina Kukleva; Russia	23:08.0	Uschi Disl; Germany	23:08.7	Katrin Apel; Germany	23:32.4
Relay	Germany; Uschi Disl; Martina Zellner; Katrin Apel; Petra Behle	1:40:13.6	Russia; Olga Melnik; Galina Kukleva; Albina Akhatova; Olga Romasko	1:40:25.2	Norway; Ann Elen Skjelbreid; Annette Sikveland; Gunn Margit Andreassen; Liv Grete Skjelbreid	1:40:37.3

== Participating nations ==
Thirty-two nations sent biathletes to compete in the events. Below is a list of the competing nations; in parentheses are the number of national competitors.

- Australia (1)
- Austria (5)
- Belarus (9)
- Bulgaria (5)
- Canada (6)
- China (4)
- Czech Republic (8)
- Estonia (4)
- Finland (7)
- France (10)
- Great Britain (2)
- Germany (11)
- Greece (1)
- Hungary (5)
- Italy (6)
- Japan (8)
- Kazakhstan (8)
- Kyrgyzstan (1)
- South Korea (1)
- Latvia (5)
- Lithuania (1)
- Moldova (2)
- Norway (9)
- Poland (9)
- Romania (2)
- Russia (11)
- Slovenia (9)
- Switzerland (1)
- Slovakia (5)
- Sweden (8)
- Ukraine (10)
- United States (9)

== See also ==
- Biathlon at the 1998 Winter Paralympics
