= 1993–94 Biathlon World Cup =

Biathlon competition

1993–94 World Cup
Discipline	Men	Women
Overall	(France) Patrice Bailly-Salins	(Belarus) Svetlana Paramygina
Nations Cup	Germany	Germany
Individual	(France) Patrice Bailly-Salins	(Italy) Nathalie Santer
Sprint	(Germany) Sven Fischer	(Belarus) Svetlana Paramygina

Competition

The 1993–94 Biathlon World Cup was a multi-race tournament over a season of biathlon, organised by the International Biathlon Union. The season started on 9 December 1993 in Bad Gastein, Austria, and ended on 20 March 1994 in Canmore, Canada. It was the 17th season of the Biathlon World Cup.

== Calendar ==
Below is the IBU World Cup calendar for the 1993–94 season.

Location	Date	Individual	Sprint	Pursuit	Mass start	Relay
(Austria) Bad Gastein	9–12 December	●	●			●
(Slovenia) Pokljuka	16–19 December	●	●			●
(Germany) Ruhpolding	13–16 January	●	●			●
(Italy) Antholz	20–23 January	●	●			●
(Norway) Lillehammer	18–26 February	●	●			●
(Canada) Hinton	10–13 March	●	●			●
(Canada) Canmore	17–20 March	●	●			●
Total		6	6	0	0	6

- Results from the Olympic Games did not count toward the World Cup.
- The relays were technically unofficial races as they did not count towards anything in the World Cup.

== World Cup Podium ==
=== Men ===
Stage	Date	Place	Discipline	Winner	Second	Third	Yellow bib (After competition)	Det.
1	9 December 1993	(Austria) Bad Gastein	20 km Individual	(Russia) Sergei Tarasov	(Germany) Ricco Groß	(Poland) Tomasz Sikora	(Russia) Sergei Tarasov	Detail
1	11 December 1993	(Austria) Bad Gastein	10 km Sprint	(France) Patrice Bailly-Salins	(Finland) Vesa Hietalahti	(Russia) Valeri Kiriyenko	(Germany) Ricco Groß	Detail
2	16 December 1993	(Slovenia) Pokljuka	20 km Individual	(France) Patrice Bailly-Salins	(Russia) Sergei Tchepikov	(Russia) Valeri Kiriyenko	(Germany) Ricco Groß	Detail
2	18 December 1993	(Slovenia) Pokljuka	10 km Sprint	(Belarus) Viktor Maigourov	(Germany) Sven Fischer	(Belarus) Alexandr Popov	(Germany) Ricco Groß	Detail
3	13 January 1994	(Germany) Ruhpolding	20 km Individual	(France) Patrice Bailly-Salins	(Belarus) Viktor Maigourov	(Italy) Andreas Zingerle	(France) Patrice Bailly-Salins	Detail
3	15 January 1994	(Germany) Ruhpolding	10 km Sprint	(Italy) Patrick Favre	(Czech Republic) Petr Garabík	(Belarus) Oleg Ryzhenkov	(France) Patrice Bailly-Salins	Detail
4	20 January 1994	(Italy) Antholz-Anterselva	20 km Individual	(Germany) Sven Fischer	(Italy) Patrick Favre	(Germany) Frank Luck	(France) Patrice Bailly-Salins	Detail
4	22 January 1994	(Italy) Antholz-Anterselva	10 km Sprint	(Germany) Frank Luck	(Italy) Pieralberto Carrara	(Russia) Sergei Tarasov	(France) Patrice Bailly-Salins	Detail
5	10 March 1994	(Canada) Hinton	20 km Individual	(Italy) Wilfried Pallhuber	(Russia) Valeri Kiriyenko	(Germany) Frank Luck	(Germany) Sven Fischer	Detail
5	12 March 1994	(Canada) Hinton	10 km Sprint	(Germany) Sven Fischer	(Russia) Vladimir Drachev	(Germany) Frank Luck	(Germany) Sven Fischer	Detail
6	17 March 1994	(Canada) Canmore	20 km Individual	(Italy) Hubert Leitgeb	(Belarus) Vadim Sashurin	(Norway) Jon Åge Tyldum	(France) Patrice Bailly-Salins	Detail
6	19 March 1994	(Canada) Canmore	10 km Sprint	(Norway) Sylfest Glimsdal	(Belarus) Viktor Maigourov	(France) Patrice Bailly-Salins	(France) Patrice Bailly-Salins	Detail

=== Women ===
Stage	Date	Place	Discipline	Winner	Second	Third	Yellow bib (After competition)	Det.
1	9 December 1993	(Austria) Bad Gastein	15 km Individual	(Italy) Nathalie Santer	(Ukraine) Nadiya Billova	(Germany) Simone Greiner-Petter-M.	(Italy) Nathalie Santer	Detail
1	11 December 1993	(Austria) Bad Gastein	7.5 km Sprint	(Italy) Nathalie Santer	(Norway) Hildegunn Fossen	(Norway) Gunn Margit Andreassen	(Italy) Nathalie Santer	Detail
2	16 December 1993	(Slovenia) Pokljuka	15 km Individual	(France) Anne Briand	(Russia) Natalya Snytina	(Italy) Nathalie Santer	(Italy) Nathalie Santer	Detail
2	18 December 1993	(Slovenia) Pokljuka	7.5 km Sprint	(Norway) Elin Kristiansen	(Norway) Anne Elvebakk	(Italy) Nathalie Santer	(Italy) Nathalie Santer	Detail
3	13 January 1994	(Germany) Ruhpolding	15 km Individual	(France) Emmanuelle Claret	(Belarus) Svetlana Paramygina	(France) Corinne Niogret	(Italy) Nathalie Santer	Detail
3	15 January 1994	(Germany) Ruhpolding	7.5 km Sprint	(Belarus) Svetlana Paramygina	(Italy) Nathalie Santer	(Russia) Nadezhda Talanova	(Italy) Nathalie Santer	Detail
4	20 January 1994	(Italy) Antholz-Anterselva	15 km Individual	(France) Anne Briand	(Russia) Lyubov Belyakova	(Germany) Uschi Disl	(Italy) Nathalie Santer	Detail
4	22 January 1994	(Italy) Antholz-Anterselva	7.5 km Sprint	(Belarus) Svetlana Paramygina	(Germany) Antje Misersky	(Russia) Olga Simushina	(Italy) Nathalie Santer	Detail
5	10 March 1994	(Canada) Hinton	15 km Individual	(Belarus) Svetlana Paramygina	(France) Véronique Claudel	(France) Anne Briand	(Belarus) Svetlana Paramygina	Detail
5	12 March 1994	(Canada) Hinton	7.5 km Sprint	(Belarus) Svetlana Paramygina	(France) Véronique Claudel	(Germany) Uschi Disl	(Belarus) Svetlana Paramygina	Detail
6	17 March 1994	(Canada) Canmore	15 km Individual	(Germany) Uschi Disl	(Canada) Myriam Bédard	(Italy) Nathalie Santer	(Belarus) Svetlana Paramygina	Detail
6	19 March 1994	(Canada) Canmore	7.5 km Sprint	(Russia) Nadezhda Talanova	(Belarus) Svetlana Paramygina	(Italy) Nathalie Santer	(Belarus) Svetlana Paramygina	Detail

=== Men's team ===
Event	Date	Place	Discipline	Winner	Second	Third
1	12 December 1993	(Austria) Bad Gastein	4x7.5 km Relay	Belarus Igor Khokhriakov; Vadim Sashurin; Oleg Ryzhenkov; Alexander Popov	France Thierry Dusserre; Patrice Bailly-Salins; Christian Dumont; Hervé Flandin	Germany Ricco Gross; Frank Luck; Mark Kirchner; Jens Steinigen
2	19 December 1993	(Slovenia) Pokljuka	4x7.5 km Relay	Germany Peter Sendel; Frank Luck; Mark Kirchner; Sven Fischer	France Thierry Dusserre; Patrice Bailly-Salins; Gilles Marguet; Christian Dumont	Italy Patrick Favre; Johann Passler; Wilfried Pallhuber; Andreas Zingerle
3	16 January 1994	(Germany) Ruhpolding	4x7.5 km Relay	France Thierry Dusserre; Patrice Bailly-Salins; Lionel Laurent; Hervé Flandin	Italy Patrick Favre; Johann Passler; Pieralberto Carrara; Hubert Leitgeb	Germany Jens Steinigen; Frank Luck; Mark Kirchner; Sven Fischer
4	23 January 1994	(Italy) Antholz	4x7.5 km Relay	Russia Valeriy Medvedtsev; Valeri Kiriyenko; Sergei Tarasov; Sergei Tchepikov	Germany Ricco Gross; Frank Luck; Mark Kirchner; Sven Fischer	Sweden Ulf Johansson; Per Brandt; Leif Andersson; Fredrik Kuoppa
5	13 March 1994	(Canada) Hinton	4x7.5 km Relay	Italy Patrick Favre; Hubert Leitgeb; Pieralberto Carrara; Andreas Zingerle	Germany Ricco Gross; Frank Luck; Mark Kirchner; Sven Fischer	France Thierry Dusserre; Patrice Bailly-Salins; Lionel Laurent; Hervé Flandin
6	20 March 1994	(Canada) Canmore	4x7.5 km Relay	Russia Alexei Kobelev; Vladimir Drachev; Sergei Tarasov; Alexander Tropnikov	Belarus Viktor Maigourov; Oleg Ryzhenkov; Alexander Popov; Vadim Sashurin	Italy Patrick Favre; Wilfried Pallhuber; Pieralberto Carrara; Andreas Zingerle

=== Women's team ===
Event	Date	Place	Discipline	Winner	Second	Third
1	12 December 1993	(Austria) Bad Gastein	4x7.5 km Relay	Norway Elin Kristiansen; Annette Sikveland; Gunn Margit Andreassen; Hildegunn Fossen	Czech Republic Jana Kulhavá; Jiřina Pelcová; Iveta Knížková; Eva Háková	France Delphyne Heymann; Emmanuelle Claret; Veronique Claudel; Anne Briand
2	19 December 1993	(Slovenia) Pokljuka	4x7.5 km Relay	Belarus Irina Kokoueva; Natalia Permiakova; Natalia Ryzhenkova; Svetlana Paramygina	Norway Elin Kristiansen; Annette Sikveland; Anne Elvebakk; Hildegunn Fossen	France Corinne Niogret; Veronique Claudel; Delphyne Heymann; Anne Briand
3	16 January 1994	(Germany) Ruhpolding	4x7.5 km Relay	France Corinne Niogret; Veronique Claudel; Delphyne Heymann; Anne Briand	Germany Uschi Disl; Simone Greiner; Antje Harvey; Petra Schaaf	Russia Olga Simushina; Anfisa Reztsova; Natalia Snytina; Luisa Noskova
4	23 January 1994	(Italy) Antholz	4x7.5 km Relay	Germany Uschi Disl; Petra Schaaf; Simone Greiner; Antje Harvey	Norway Ann-Elen Skjelbreid; Annette Sikveland; Anne Elvebakk; Hildegunn Fossen	France Corinne Niogret; Veronique Claudel; Delphyne Heymann; Anne Briand
5	13 March 1994	(Canada) Hinton	4x7.5 km Relay	Germany Uschi Disl; Petra Schaaf; Simone Greiner; Antje Harvey	France Nathalie Beausire; Veronique Claudel; Emmanuelle Claret; Anne Briand	Norway Ann-Elen Skjelbreid; Ase Idland; Anne Elvebakk; Annette Sikveland
6	20 March 1994	(Canada) Canmore	4x7.5 km Relay	Germany Uschi Disl; Petra Schaaf; Simone Greiner; Antje Harvey	United States Beth Coats; Joan Miller Smith; Laurie Tavares; Ntala Skinner	Norway Ann-Elen Skjelbreid; Ase Idland; Hildegunn Mikkelsplass; Annette Sikveland

== Standings: Men ==
=== Overall ===
Pos.		Points
1.	(France) Patrice Bailly-Salins	193
2.	(Germany) Sven Fischer	191
3.	(Germany) Frank Luck	163
4.	(Russia) Valeri Kiriyenko	147
5.	(Italy) Wilfried Pallhuber	142

- Final standings after 12 races.

=== Individual ===
Pos.		Points
1.	(France) Patrice Bailly-Salins	96
2.	(Germany) Sven Fischer	93
3.	(Germany) Ricco Groß	88
4.	(Russia) Valeri Kiriyenko	86
5.	(Germany) Frank Luck	85

- Final standings after 6 races.

=== Sprint ===
Pos.		Points
1.	(Germany) Sven Fischer	98
2.	(France) Patrice Bailly-Salins	97
3.	(Belarus) Viktor Maigourov	87
4.	(Russia) Vladimir Drachev	84
5.	(Germany) Frank Luck	78

- Final standings after 6 races.

=== Nation ===
Pos.		Points
1.	Germany	3737
2.	Italy	3681
3.	Russia	3643
4.	Belarus	3528
5.	France	3513

- Final standings after 18 races.

== Standings: Women ==
=== Overall ===
Pos.		Points
1.	(Belarus) Svetlana Paramygina	215
2.	(Italy) Nathalie Santer	204
3.	(France) Anne Briand	173
4.	(Germany) Uschi Disl	167
5.	(Russia) Nadezhda Talanova	138

- Final standings after 12 races.

=== Individual ===
Pos.		Points
1.	(Italy) Nathalie Santer	100
2.	(Belarus) Svetlana Paramygina	99
3.	(France) Anne Briand	97
4.	(Germany) Uschi Disl	88
5.	(Germany) Simone Greiner	80

- Final standings after 6 races.

=== Sprint ===
Pos.		Points
1.	(Belarus) Svetlana Paramygina	116
2.	(Italy) Nathalie Santer	104
3.	(Russia) Nadezhda Talanova	82
4.	(Germany) Uschi Disl	79
5.	(France) Anne Briand	76

- Final standings after 6 races.

=== Nation ===
Pos.		Points
1.	Germany	3658
2.	France	3460
3.	Russia	3605
4.	Norway	3579
5.	Czech Republic	3244

- Final standings after 18 races.

== Medal table ==
Rank	Nation	Gold	Silver	Bronze	Total
1	Germany	8	6	8	22
2	France	8	5	7	20
3	Belarus	7	6	2	15
4	Italy	6	4	7	17
5	Russia	4	5	6	15
6	Norway	3	4	4	11
7	Czech Republic	0	2	0	2
8	Canada	0	1	0	1
8	Finland	0	1	0	1
8	Ukraine	0	1	0	1
8	United States	0	1	0	1
12	Poland	0	0	1	1
12	Sweden	0	0	1	1
Totals (13 entries)		36	36	36	108

== Achievements ==
Victory in this World Cup (all-time number of victories in parentheses)

Men

- Patrice Bailly-Salins (FRA), 3 (5) first places
- Sven Fischer (GER), 2 (3) first places
- Frank Luck (GER), 1 (4) first place
- Wilfried Pallhuber (ITA), 1 (3) first place
- Sergei Tarasov (RUS), 1 (2) first place
- Viktor Maigourov (BLR), 1 (1) first place
- Patrick Favre (ITA), 1 (1) first place
- Hubert Leitgeb (ITA), 1 (1) first place
- Sylfest Glimsdal (NOR), 1 (1) first place

Women

- Svetlana Paramygina (BLR), 4 (4) first places
- Anne Briand (FRA), 2 (3) first places
- Nathalie Santer (ITA), 2 (2) first places
- Elin Kristiansen (NOR), 1 (3) first place
- Uschi Disl (GER), 1 (3) first place
- Emmanuelle Claret (FRA), 1 (1) first place
- Nadezhda Talanova (RUS), 1 (1) first place

== Retirements ==
Following notable biathletes retired during or after the 1993–94 season:

- Franz Schuler (AUT)
- Christian Dumont (FRA)
- Elmar Mutschlechner (ITA)
- Eirik Kvalfoss (NOR)
- Valeriy Medvedtsev (RUS)
- Lise Meloche (CAN)
- Gabriela Suvová (CZE)
- Anne Elvebakk (NOR)
- Anfisa Reztsova (RUS)
- Elena Belova (RUS)
