= 1991–92 Biathlon World Cup =

Biathlon competition

1991–92 World Cup
Discipline	Men	Women
Overall	(Norway) Jon Åge Tyldum	(Commonwealth of Independent States) Anfisa Reztsova
Nations Cup	Norway	Norway
Individual	(Norway) Jon Åge Tyldum	(Commonwealth of Independent States) Anfisa Reztsova
Sprint	(Norway) Sylfest Glimsdal	(Commonwealth of Independent States) Anfisa Reztsova

Competition

The 1991–92 Biathlon World Cup was a multi-race tournament over a season of biathlon, organised by the UIPMB (Union Internationale de Pentathlon Moderne et Biathlon). The season started on 19 December 1991 in Hochfilzen, Austria, and ended on 22 March 1992 in Novosibirsk, Russia. It was the 15th season of the Biathlon World Cup.

The men's individual and women's sprint were moved from Holmenkollen, Norway to Skrautvål, Norway, due to rain and fog, with the planned relays being cancelled. The fifth round of the World Cup was originally going to be held in Kokkola, Finland, but were moved to Skrautvål due to a lack of snow.

== Calendar ==
Below is the World Cup calendar for the 1991–92 season.

Location	Date	Individual	Sprint	Team event	Relay
(Austria) Hochfilzen	19–22 December	●	●		●
(Germany) Ruhpolding	16–19 January	●	●		●
(Italy) Antholz-Anterselva	23–26 January	●	●		●
(Norway) Holmenkollen	6–7 March	●	●		●
(Norway) Skrautvål	10–15 March	●	●		●
(Russia) Novosibirsk	19–21 March	●	●		
Total		6	6	1	5

- Results from the Olympics did not count toward the World Cup.
- The relays were technically unofficial races as they did not count towards anything in the World Cup.

== World Cup Podium ==
=== Men ===
Stage	Date	Place	Discipline	Winner	Second	Third	Yellow bib (After competition)	Det.
1	19 December 1991	(Austria) Hochfilzen	20 km Individual	(Germany) Jens Steinigen	(France) Christian Dumont	(Germany) Mark Kirchner	(Germany) Jens Steinigen	
1	21 December 1991	(Austria) Hochfilzen	10 km Sprint	(Soviet Union) Alexandr Popov	(Norway) Sylfest Glimsdal	(Norway) Sverre Istad	(Germany) Mark Kirchner	
2	16 January 1992	(Germany) Ruhpolding	20 km Individual	(Italy) Andreas Zingerle	(Commonwealth of Independent States) Valeriy Medvedtsev	(United States) Josh Thompson	(Germany) Mark Kirchner	
2	18 January 1992	(Germany) Ruhpolding	10 km Sprint	(Germany) Jens Steinigen	(Czechoslovakia) Tomáš Kos	(France) Thierry Gerbier	(Germany) Jens Steinigen	
3	23 January 1992	(Italy) Antholz-Anterselva	20 km Individual	(Commonwealth of Independent States) Valeri Kiriyenko	(Commonwealth of Independent States) Sergei Tchepikov	(Norway) Geir Einang	(Italy) Andreas Zingerle	
3	25 January 1992	(Italy) Antholz-Anterselva	10 km Sprint	(Commonwealth of Independent States) Alexandr Popov	(Germany) Ricco Groß	(Norway) Jon Åge Tyldum	(Italy) Andreas Zingerle	
4	6 March 1992	(Norway) Oslo Holmenkollen	20 km Individual	Cancelled, held later on in Fagernes			(Italy) Andreas Zingerle	N/A
4	8 March 1992	(Norway) Oslo Holmenkollen	10 km Sprint	(Norway) Frode Løberg	(Austria) Ludwig Gredler	(Austria) Wolfgang Perner	(Italy) Andreas Zingerle	
5	10 March 1992	(Norway) Fagernes	20 km Individual	(Germany) Mark Kirchner	(Commonwealth of Independent States) Sergei Tchepikov	(Sweden) Mikael Löfgren	(Italy) Andreas Zingerle	(Norway) Frode Løberg
5	12 March 1992	(Norway) Fagernes	10 km Sprint	(France) Patrice Bailly-Salins	(Norway) Jon Åge Tyldum	(Norway) Sylfest Glimsdal	(Norway) Gisle Fenne	
5	14 March 1992	(Norway) Fagernes	20 km Individual	(Norway) Geir Einang	(Norway) Jon Åge Tyldum	(Commonwealth of Independent States) Sergei Tchepikov	(Italy) Andreas Zingerle	
6	19 March 1992	(Russia) Novosibirsk	20 km Individual	(Austria) Wolfgang Perner	(Norway) Sylfest Glimsdal	(Italy) Hubert Leitgeb	(Norway) Jon Åge Tyldum	
6	21 March 1992	(Russia) Novosibirsk	10 km Sprint	(Italy) Wilfried Pallhuber	(Austria) Ludwig Gredler	(Sweden) Mikael Löfgren	(Norway) Jon Åge Tyldum	

=== Women ===
Stage	Date	Place	Discipline	Winner	Second	Third	Yellow bib (After competition)	Det.
1	19 December 1991	(Austria) Hochfilzen	15 km Individual	(Norway) Anne Elvebakk	(Germany) Petra Schaaf	(Norway) Elin Kristiansen	(Norway) Anne Elvebakk	Detail
1	21 December 1991	(Austria) Hochfilzen	7.5 km Sprint	(Germany) Antje Misersky	(Soviet Union) Elena Belova	(Norway) Elin Kristiansen	(Norway) Anne Elvebakk	Detail
2	16 January 1992	(Germany) Ruhpolding	15 km Individual	(Germany) Uschi Disl	(Czechoslovakia) Gabriela Suvová	(Germany) Antje Misersky	(Germany) Antje Misersky	Detail
2	18 January 1992	(Germany) Ruhpolding	7.5 km Sprint	(Commonwealth of Independent States) Anfisa Reztsova	(Germany) Antje Misersky	(Germany) Petra Schaaf	(Germany) Antje Misersky	Detail
3	23 January 1992	(Italy) Antholz-Anterselva	15 km Individual	(Bulgaria) Nadezhda Aleksieva	(France) Anne Briand	(Commonwealth of Independent States) Elena Golovina	(Germany) Antje Misersky	Detail
3	25 January 1992	(Italy) Antholz-Anterselva	7.5 km Sprint	(Commonwealth of Independent States) Svetlana Petcherskaia	(Norway) Grete Ingeborg Nykkelmo	(Commonwealth of Independent States) Anfisa Reztsova	(Commonwealth of Independent States) Elena Golovina	Detail
4	6 March 1992	(Norway) Oslo Holmenkollen	15 km Individual	(Commonwealth of Independent States) Anfisa Reztsova	(France) Anne Briand	(Norway) Grete Ingeborg Nykkelmo	(Germany) Petra Schaaf	Detail
4	8 March 1992	(Norway) Oslo Holmenkollen	7.5 km Sprint	(Norway) Hildegunn Fossen	(France) Anne Briand	(Commonwealth of Independent States) Anfisa Reztsova	(Commonwealth of Independent States) Anfisa Reztsova	Detail
5	12 March 1992	(Norway) Skrautvål	7.5 km Sprint	(Commonwealth of Independent States) Anfisa Reztsova	(France) Delphyne Burlet	(Germany) Petra Schaaf	(Commonwealth of Independent States) Anfisa Reztsova	Detail
5	14 March 1992	(Norway) Skrautvål	15 km Individual	(Czechoslovakia) Jiřina Adamičková	(France) Anne Briand	(Bulgaria) Iva Shkodreva	(Commonwealth of Independent States) Anfisa Reztsova	Detail
6	19 March 1992	(Russia) Novosibirsk	15 km Individual	(Norway) Elin Kristiansen	(Commonwealth of Independent States) Anfisa Reztsova	(Bulgaria) Iva Shkodreva	(Commonwealth of Independent States) Anfisa Reztsova	Detail
6	21 March 1992	(Russia) Novosibirsk	7.5 km Sprint	(Commonwealth of Independent States) Anfisa Reztsova	(Norway) Grete Ingeborg Nykkelmo	(Germany) Petra Schaaf	(Commonwealth of Independent States) Anfisa Reztsova	Detail

=== Men's team ===
Event	Date	Place	Discipline	Winner	Second	Third
1	22 December 1991	(Austria) Hochfilzen	Team event	Soviet Union Anatoly Zhdanovich; Sergei Tarasov; Valeriy Medvedtsev; Alexander Popov	France Xavier Blond; Stéphane Bouthiaux; Lionel Laurent; Christian Dumont	Czechoslovakia Petr Garabík; Tomáš Kos; Martin Rypl; Jiří Holubec
2	19 January 1992	(Germany) Ruhpolding	4x7.5 km Relay	Italy Pieralberto Carrara; Johann Passler; Edmund Zitturi; Andreas Zingerle	Germany Frank Luck; Mark Kirchner; Jens Steinigen; Fritz Fischer	CIS Sergei Tchepikov; Sergei Tarasov; Valeriy Medvedtsev; Alexander Popov
3	26 January 1992	(Italy) Antholz	4x7.5 km Relay	Italy Hubert Leitgeb; Johann Passler; Pieralberto Carrara; Andreas Zingerle	CIS Alexander Popov; Sergei Tarasov; Valeri Kiriyenko; Sergei Tchepikov	Norway Geir Einang; Jon Åge Tyldum; Gisle Fenne; Eirik Kvalfoss
5	15 March 1992	(Norway) Fagernes	4x7.5 km Relay	Norway I Geir Einang; Gisle Fenne; Jon Åge Tyldum; Frode Løberg	Austria Ludwig Gredler; Wolfgang Perner; Franz Schuler; Alfred Eder	Norway II Eirik Kvalfoss; Sylfest Glimsdal; Jo Severin Matberg; Halvard Hanevold

=== Women's team ===
Event	Date	Place	Discipline	Winner	Second	Third
2	19 January 1992	(Germany) Ruhpolding	3x6 km Relay	Germany Uschi Disl; Antje Misersky; Petra Schaaf	CIS Elena Belova; Anfisa Reztsova; Svetlana Petcherskaia	Norway Signe Trosten; Anne Elvebakk; Hildegunn Fossen
3	26 January 1992	(Italy) Antholz	3x6 km Relay	France Corinne Niogret; Veronique Claudel; Anne Briand	Germany Uschi Disl; Antje Misersky; Petra Schaaf	CIS Elena Golovina; Anfisa Reztsova; Svetlana Petcherskaia
5	15 March 1992	(Norway) Fagernes	3x6 km Relay	France Corinne Niogret; Veronique Claudel; Anne Briand	Norway Signe Trosten; Hildegunn Fossen; Elin Kristiansen	Germany Uschi Disl; Inga Kesper; Petra Schaaf

== Standings: Men ==
=== Overall ===
Pos.		Points
1.	(Norway) Jon Åge Tyldum	173
2.	(Sweden) Mikael Löfgren	145
3.	(Norway) Sylfest Glimsdal	131
4.	(France) Patrice Bailly-Salins	129
5.	(Italy) Johann Passler	129

- Final standings after 12 races.

=== Individual ===
Pos.		Points
1.	(Norway) Jon Åge Tyldum	89
2.	(Commonwealth of Independent States) Sergei Tchepikov	86
3.	(Germany) Mark Kirchner	82
4.	(Italy) Andreas Zingerle	82
5.	(Norway) Geir Einang	81

- Final standings after 6 races.

=== Sprint ===
Pos.		Points
1.	(Norway) Sylfest Glimsdal	88
2.	(France) Patrice Bailly-Salins	85
3.	(Sweden) Mikael Löfgren	85
4.	(Norway) Jon Åge Tyldum	84
5.	(Norway) Gisle Fenne	82

- Final standings after 6 races.

=== Nation ===
Pos.		Points
1.	Norway	5734
2.	Italy	5381
3.	France	5356
4.	Germany	5244
5.	Austria	4921

- Final standings after 17 races.

== Standings: Women ==
=== Overall ===
Pos.		Points
1.	(Commonwealth of Independent States) Anfisa Reztsova	212
2.	(France) Anne Briand	179
3.	(Germany) Petra Schaaf	173
4.	(Commonwealth of Independent States) Svetlana Petcherskaia	153
5.	(Germany) Uschi Disl	147

- Final standings after 12 races.

=== Individual ===
Pos.		Points
1.	(Commonwealth of Independent States) Anfisa Reztsova	98
2.	(France) Anne Briand	98
3.	(Norway) Elin Kristiansen	95
4.	(Bulgaria) Iva Shkodreva	82
5.	(Germany) Petra Schaaf	81

- Final standings after 6 races.

=== Sprint ===
Pos.		Points
1.	(Commonwealth of Independent States) Anfisa Reztsova	114
2.	(Germany) Petra Schaaf	93
3.	(Commonwealth of Independent States) Elena Belova	84
4.	(Germany) Antje Misersky	81
5.	(France) Anne Briand	81

- Final standings after 6 races.

=== Nation ===
Pos.		Points
1.	Norway	5645
2.	Germany	5598
3.	France	5341
4.	CIS	5328
5.	Czechoslovakia	5077

- Final standings after 17 races.

== Medal table ==
Rank	Nation	Gold	Silver	Bronze	Total
1	CIS	7	6	6	19
2	Norway	6	7	10	23
3	Germany	6	5	6	17
4	Italy	4	0	1	5
5	France	3	6	1	10
6	Austria	1	3	1	5
7	Czechoslovakia	1	2	0	3
8	Soviet Union	1	1	0	2
9	Bulgaria	1	0	2	3
10	Sweden	0	0	2	2
11	United States	0	0	1	1
Totals (11 entries)		30	30	30	90

== Achievements ==
=== Men ===
First World Cup career victory

- Jens Steinigen (GER), 25, in his 4th season — the WC 1 Individual in Hochfilzen; it also was his first podium
- Valeri Kiriyenko (CIS), 26, in his 3rd season — the WC 3 Individual in Antholz-Anterselva; it also was his first podium
- Frode Løberg (NOR), 29, in his 6th season — the WC 4 Sprint in Holmenkollen; first podium was the 1989–90 Individual in Walchsee
- Patrice Bailly-Salins (FRA), 27, in his 4th season — the WC 5 Sprint in Skrautvål; first podium was the 1990–91 Individual in Canmore
- Wolfgang Perner (AUT), 24, in his 2nd season — the WC 6 Individual in Novosibirsk; first podium was the 1991–92 Sprint in Holmenkollen
- Wilfried Pallhuber (ITA), 24, in his 6th season — the WC 6 Sprint in Novosibirsk; it also was his first podium

First World Cup podium

- Sylfest Glimsdal (NOR), 25, in his 5th season — no. 2 in the WC 1 Sprint in Hochfilzen
- Sverre Istad (NOR), 26, in his 5th season — no. 3 in the WC 1 Sprint in Hochfilzen
- Tomáš Kos (TCH), 24, in his 4th season — no. 2 in the WC 2 Sprint in Ruhpolding
- Jon Åge Tyldum (NOR), 23, in his 5th season — no. 3 in the WC 3 Sprint in Antholz-Anterselva
- Ludwig Gredler (AUT), 24, in his 2nd season — no. 2 in the WC 4 Sprint in Holmenkollen
- Wolfgang Perner (AUT), 24, in his 2nd season — no. 3 in the WC 4 Sprint in Holmenkollen
- Mikael Löfgren (SWE), 22, in his 6th season — no. 3 in the WC 5 Individual in Skrautvål

Victory in this World Cup (all-time number of victories in parentheses)

- Alexandr Popov (CIS), 2 (5) first places
- Jens Steinigen (GER), 2 (2) first places
- Mark Kirchner (GER), 1 (4) first place
- Andreas Zingerle (ITA), 1 (2) first place
- Geir Einang (NOR), 1 (2) first place
- Valeri Kiriyenko (CIS), 1 (1) first place
- Frode Løberg (NOR), 1 (1) first place
- Patrice Bailly-Salins (FRA), 1 (1) first place
- Wolfgang Perner (AUT), 1 (1) first place
- Wilfried Pallhuber (ITA), 1 (1) first place

=== Women ===
Victory in this World Cup (all-time number of victories in parentheses)

- Anfisa Reztsova (CIS), 4 (4) first places
- Jiřina Adamičková (TCH), 1 (6) first place
- Anne Elvebakk (NOR), 1 (5) first place
- Svetlana Petcherskaia (CIS), 1 (5) first place
- Elin Kristiansen (NOR), 1 (3) first place
- Antje Misersky (GER), 1 (2) first place
- Uschi Disl (GER), 1 (2) first place
- Nadezhda Aleksieva (BUL), 1 (2) first place
- Hildegunn Fossen (NOR), 1 (1) first place

== Retirements ==
Following notable biathletes retired after the 1991–92 season:

- Frank-Peter Roetsch (GER)
- Gottlieb Taschler (ITA)
- Anatoly Zhdanovich (CIS)
- Josh Thompson (USA)
- Grete Ingeborg Nykkelmo (NOR)
- Elena Golovina (RUS)
