= 1991–92 Biathlon World Cup – Overall Men =

For each event, a first place gives 30 points, a 2nd place 26 pts, a 3rd place 24 pts, a 4th place 22 pts, then linearly decreasing by one point down to the 25th place. Equal placings (ties) give an equal number of points. The sum of all WC points of the season gives the biathlete's total WC score.

== 1990–91 Top 3 Standings ==
Medal	Athlete	Points
Gold:	(Germany) Mark Kirchner	201
Silver:	(Soviet Union) Sergei Tchepikov	198
Bronze:	(Italy) Andreas Zingerle	190

== Standings ==
#	Name	HOC IN	HOC SP	RUH IN	RUH SP	ANT IN	ANT SP	OSL IN	OSL SP	FAG IN	FAG SP	NOV IN	NOV SP	Total
1.	Jon Åge Tyldum (NOR)	22	21	—	—	21	24	~~0~~	12	26	26	20	13	185
2	Mikael Löfgren (SWE)	—	—	~~0~~	20	12	21	24	13	11	20	13	24	158
3	Patrice Bailly-Salins (FRA)	~~0~~	~~0~~	18	16	~~1~~	18	2	15	12	30	12	21	144
4	Andreas Zingerle (ITA)	11	~~3~~	30	15	19	17	11	~~0~~	18	~~4~~	15	4	140
5	Sylfest Glimsdal (NOR)	~~0~~	26	—	—	0	0	0	16	17	24	26	22	131
6	Johann Passler (ITA)	~~0~~	—	12	22	~~0~~	22	20	0	6	17	21	10	130
7	Gisle Fenne (NOR)	16	22	—	18	~~0~~	10	12	21	~~0~~	21	3	0	123
8	Alexandr Popov (URS)	0	30	0	0	20	30	—	—	—	—	22	18	120
9	Wilfried Pallhuber (ITA)	8	16	3	—	~~0~~	~~0~~	9	19	10	0	16	30	111
10	Geir Einang (NOR)	10	13	—	—	24	15	17	0	30	0	—	—	109
11	Sergei Tchepikov (URS)	—	—	10	8	26	14	26	—	24	0	—	0	108
12	Mark Kirchner (GER)	24	20	7	~~0~~	5	0	30	0	21	0	—	—	107
13	Frode Løberg (NOR)	~~0~~	~~0~~	—	0	8	0	19	30	0	22	10	17	106
14	Wolfgang Perner (AUT)	~~0~~	~~0~~	~~0~~	2	0	4	0	24	13	19	30	0	92
15	Ludwig Gredler (AUT)	~~0~~	~~0~~	~~0~~	5	0	0	0	26	0	18	14	26	89
16	Alfred Eder (AUT)	—	10	~~0~~	~~0~~	0	0	14	11	19	15	19	0	88
17	Eirik Kvalfoss (NOR)	1	12	—	9	4	20	5	2	~~0~~	16	~~0~~	16	85
18	Christian Dumont (FRA)	26	7	15	10	~~0~~	~~0~~	~~0~~	3	5	6	10	0	82
19	Hubert Leitgeb (ITA)	3	8	~~0~~	~~0~~	~~0~~	19	18	0	0	0	24	9	81
20	Steffen Hoos (GER)	12	4	9	~~0~~	14	~~0~~	7	~~0~~	1	13	0	19	79
21	Valeri Kiriyenko (URS)	—	—	0	17	30	11	—	—	—	—	17	—	75
22	Jens Steinigen (GER)	30	0	0	30	0	0	—	0	—	—	0	11	71
23	Thierry Gerbier (FRA)	~~0~~	~~0~~	8	24	13	~~0~~	0	20	0	0	0	6	71
24	Franz Schuler (AUT)	~~0~~	~~0~~	~~0~~	6	0	0	0	17	16	12	0	20	71
25	Frank-Peter Roetsch (GER)	18	11	19	0	18	2	—	—	—	—	—	—	68
26	Sergei Tarasov (URS)	0	14	21	13	17	—	—	—	—	—	—	—	65
27	Frank Luck (GER)	6	17	~~0~~	12	9	—	0	—	14	0	0	0	58
28	Valeriy Medvedtsev (URS)	15	0	26	0	16	0	—	—	—	—	0	—	57
29	Lionel Laurent (FRA)	21	~~0~~	14	0	22	0	—	0	0	—	0	0	57
30	Leif Andersson (SWE)	—	—	13	0	0	0	22	18	3	0	—	—	56
#	Name	HOC IN	HOC SP	RUH IN	RUH SP	ANT IN	ANT SP	OSL IN	OSL SP	FAG IN	FAG SP	NOV IN	NOV SP	Total
31	Ricco Groß (GER)	17	~~0~~	11	0	0	26	0	0	0	1	—	—	55
32	Xavier Blond (FRA)	~~0~~	18	4	21	—	—	0	0	0	0	0	12	55
33	Pieralberto Carrara (ITA)	0	19	20	3	0	8	0	0	—	—	—	—	50
34	Anatoly Zhdanovich (URS)	20	1	0	14	0	0	—	—	—	—	0	15	50
35	Stéphane Bouthiaux (FRA)	~~0~~	0	0	0	0	13	—	9	0	—	18	8	48
36	Fritz Fischer (GER)	14	~~0~~	16	11	0	1	4	0	0	0	—	—	46
37	Evgeny Redkin (URS)	—	—	~~0~~	0	11	0	8	5	20	0	0	0	44
38	Urmas Kaldvee (EST)	—	—	1	~~0~~	10	12	0	0	0	9	9	0	41
39	Thierry Dusserre (FRA)	—	—	0	0	0	0	—	15	22	—	0	0	37
40	Bostjan Lekan (SLO)	~~0~~	~~0~~	~~0~~	0	0	0	21	0	0	8	7	0	36
41	Hervé Flandin (FRA)	4	0	0	0	15	16	—	0	—	—	—	—	35
42	Jean-Marc Chabloz (SWI)	~~0~~	0	0	0	0	5	15	6	8	0	—	—	34
43	Egon Leitner (AUT)	19	~~0~~	~~0~~	~~0~~	7	0	6	0	0	0	0	0	32
44	Tomáš Kos (TCH)	5	0	0	26	0	—	—	0	—	—	—	—	31
45	Raik Dittrich (GER)	~~0~~	15	~~0~~	~~0~~	0	0	1	0	0	14	0	0	30
46	Aleksander Grajf (SLO)	0	5	—	—	—	—	3	22	0	0	0	0	30
47	Edmund Zitturi (ITA)	0	9	0	19	0	0	—	0	—	—	0	0	28
48	Sverre Istad (NOR)	2	24	—	0	0	0	—	—	—	—	—	—	26
49	Josh Thompson (USA)	—	—	24	0	0	0	—	—	—	—	—	—	24
50	Martin Rypl (TCH)	9	0	5	0	—	0	—	10	—	—	0	0	24
51	Jiří Holubec (TCH)	0	0	22	0	0	—	—	0	—	—	—	—	22
52	Janez Ožbolt (SLO)	~~0~~	0	17	—	—	0	0	0	2	0	0	2	21
53	Jure Velepec (SLO)	0	0	—	—	—	—	10	0	0	0	11	0	21
54	Petr Garabík (TCH)	0	6	0	0	0	6	—	—	—	—	8	0	20
55	Michael Dixon (GBR)	~~0~~	—	~~0~~	0	0	0	0	0	0	2	0	14	16
56	Erkki Latvala (FIN)	0	0	—	—	—	—	16	0	0	0	—	—	16
57	Jo Severin Matberg (NOR)	—	—	—	—	—	—	—	—	15	—	—	—	15
58	Gilles Marguet (FRA)	0	0	—	—	—	—	0	—	9	3	2	0	14
59	Jaakko Niemi (FIN)	0	0	—	—	0	0	0	0	7	7	—	—	14
60	Harri Eloranta (FIN)	0	0	—	—	0	0	13	0	—	0	—	—	13
#	Name	HOC IN	HOC SP	RUH IN	RUH SP	ANT IN	ANT SP	OSL IN	OSL SP	FAG IN	FAG SP	NOV IN	NOV SP	Total
61	Valeriy Noskov (URS)	13	—	—	—	—	—	—	—	—	—	—	—	13
62	Halvard Hanevold (NOR)	—	—	—	—	—	—	0	7	—	5	—	—	12
63	Bruno Hofstätter (AUT)	~~0~~	~~0~~	~~0~~	0	6	0	0	0	0	0	0	5	11
64	Ismo Mäkinen (FIN)	0	—	—	—	—	—	0	0	0	11	—	—	11
65	Uros Velepec (SLO)	~~0~~	~~0~~	~~0~~	7	0	0	—	0	0	0	4	0	11
66	Ulf Johansson (SWE)	—	—	2	4	0	—	0	0	4	0	—	—	10
67	Rami Mäkelä (FIN)	0	0	—	—	—	—	0	0	10	0	—	—	10
68	Gottlieb Taschler (ITA)	0	0	6	1	3	0	—	—	—	—	—	—	10
69	Tord Wiksten (SWE)	—	—	0	0	0	9	0	0	0	0	—	—	9
70	Aivo Udras (EST)	~~0~~	—	0	—	0	0	0	8	0	0	0	0	8
71	Steve Cyr (CAN)	—	—	0	0	0	7	—	—	—	—	—	—	7
72	Misao Kodate (JPN)	7	—	0	0	0	0	—	—	—	—	—	—	7
72	Alexandr Petcherskiy (URS)	—	—	—	—	—	—	—	—	—	—	0	7	7
74	Miroslav Janata (TCH)	—	—	—	—	—	—	—	—	—	—	6	0	6
75	Vladimir Rozhkov (URS)	—	—	—	—	—	—	—	—	—	—	5	0	5
76	Hillar Zahkna (EST)	—	—	0	—	0	0	0	4	0	0	0	0	4
77	Vesa Hietalahti (FIN)	—	—	—	—	0	3	—	—	—	—	—	—	3
78	Pavel Sládek (TCH)	0	0	0	0	2	0	—	0	—	—	0	1	3
79	Gintaras Jasinskas (LTU)	0	0	0	0	—	—	—	—	—	—	0	3	3
80	Elmar Mutschlechner (ITA)	0	2	0	0	0	0	—	0	—	—	0	0	2
81	Ivan Masařík (TCH)	0	0	0	0	0	—	—	1	—	—	—	—	1
82	Kenneth Rudd (GBR)	~~0~~	~~0~~	~~0~~	0	0	0	0	0	0	0	1	0	1
#	Name	HOC IN	HOC SP	RUH IN	RUH SP	ANT IN	ANT SP	OSL IN	OSL SP	FAG IN	FAG SP	NOV IN	NOV SP	Total
