= Biathlon at the 1994 Winter Olympics – Women's relay =

Women's relay at the XVII Olympic Winter Games
- Venue: Birkebeineren Ski Stadium
- Dates: 25 February 1994
- Competitors: 68 from 17 nations
- Winning time: 1:47:19.5

Medalists
1st place, gold medalist(s)		Nadezhda Talanova; Natalya Snytina; Luiza Noskova; Anfisa Reztsova	Russia
2nd place, silver medalist(s)		Uschi Disl; Antje Harvey; Simone Greiner-Petter-Memm; Petra Schaaf	Germany
3rd place, bronze medalist(s)		Corinne Niogret; Véronique Claudel; Delphyne Heymann; Anne Briand	France

The Women's biathlon relay competition of the Lillehammer 1994 Olympics was held at Birkebeineren Ski Stadium on February 25, 1994. Each national team consisted of four members, with each skiing 7.5 kilometres and shooting twice, once prone and once standing. The event was expanded to 4 × 7.5 km, as it had been 3 × 7.5 km in Albertville in 1992.

== Results ==
Rank	Bib	Country	Time	Penalties	Deficit
1st place, gold medalist(s)	2	Russia; Nadezhda Talanova; Natalya Snytina; Luiza Noskova; Anfisa Reztsova	1:47:19.5; 27:21.1; 27:25.4; 26:59.0; 25:34.0	0 0; 0 0; 0 0; 0 0; 0 0	—
2nd place, silver medalist(s)	1	Germany; Uschi Disl; Antje Harvey; Simone Greiner-Petter-Memm; Petra Schaaf	1:51:16.5; 26:56.8; 26:38.5; 30:43.1; 26:58.1	3 3; 0 0; 0 0; 3 3; 0 0	+3:57.0
3rd place, bronze medalist(s)	5	France; Corinne Niogret; Véronique Claudel; Delphyne Heymann; Anne Briand	1:52:28.3; 27:32.5; 28:15.3; 28:30.2; 28:10.3	0 1; 0 0; 0 0; 0 0; 0 1	+5:08.8
4	15	Norway; Ann-Elen Skjelbreid; Annette Sikveland; Hildegunn Fossen; Elin Kristiansen	1:54:08.1; 29:36.7; 28:21.2; 28:17.0; 27:53.2	0 2; 0 1; 0 1; 0 0; 0 0	+6:48.6
5	7	Ukraine; Valentina Tserbe-Nessina; Maryna Skolota; Olena Petrova; Elena Ogurtsova	1:54:26,5; 27:59.6; 30:14.2; 28:25.4; 27:47.3	2 1; 0 0; 1 1; 0 0; 1 0	+7:07.0
6	3	Belarus; Irina Kokoueva; Natalia Permiakova; Natalia Ryzhenkova; Svetlana Paramyguina	1:54:55.1; 30:10.9; 29:19.5; 28:43.9; 26:40.8	5 3; 4 0; 1 1; 0 2; 0 0	+7:35.6
7	6	Czech Republic; Jana Kulhavá; Jiřína Pelcová; Iveta Roubíčková; Eva Háková	1:57:00.8; 29:03.0; 30:24.5; 30:19.5; 27:13.8	3 0; 0 0; 1 0; 2 0; 0 0	+9:41.3
8	16	United States; Beth Coats; Joan Smith; Laurie Tavares; Joan Guetschow	1:57:35.9; 31:35.2; 27:34.7; 28:15.4; 30:10.6	0 3; 0 3; 0 0; 0 0; 0 0	+10:16.4
9	4	Sweden; Eva-Karin Westin; Catarina Eklund; Maria Schylander; Heléne Dahlberg	1:58:07.2; 30:43.4; 29:06.5; 29:18.0; 28:59.3	0 0; 0 0; 0 0; 0 0; 0 0	+10:47.7
10	10	Finland; Katja Holanti; Tuija Sikiö; Mari Lampinen; Tuija Vuoksiala	1:58:55.7; 33:11.0; 28:24.2; 29:50.7; 27:29.8	0 4; 0 3; 0 0; 0 1; 0 0	+11:36.2
11	13	Poland; Anna Stera-Kustusz; Helena Mikołajczyk; Agata Suszka; Halina Pitoń	1:59:18.1; 30:03.6; 30:01.9; 29:17.9; 29:54.7	2 2; 0 0; 0 2; 0 0; 2 0	+11:58.6
12	11	Estonia; Jelena Poljakova-Všivtseva; Eveli Peterson; Krista Lepik; Merle Viirmaa	1:59:30.4; 29:31.4; 29:10.4; 29:33.6; 31:15.0	0 2; 0 0; 0 0; 0 1; 0 1	+12:10.9
13	8	Bulgaria; Mariya Manolova; Nadezhda Aleksieva; Ekaterina Dafovska; Iva Karagiozova-Shkodreva	2:00:16.2; 29:33.3; 31:47.3; 29:26.1; 29:29.5	2 1; 0 0; 1 1; 1 0; 0 0	+12:56.7
14	12	China; Liu Guilan; Song Aiqin; Wang Jinping; Wang Jinfen	2:01:08.8; 30:42.8; 28:51.0; 33:04.2; 28:30.8	2 3; 0 0; 0 0; 2 2; 0 1	+13:49.3
15	14	Canada; Jane Isakson; Myriam Bédard; Kristin Berg; Lise Meloche	2:02:22.7; 31:42.6; 27:20.9; 32:15.6; 31:03.6	3 3; 0 0; 0 0; 3 0; 0 3	+15:03.2
16	17	Romania; Adina Țuțulan-Șotropa; Mihaela Cârstoi; Ana Roman; Ileana Ianoşiu-Hangan	2:02:36.8; 31:01.3; 31:17.5; 30:33.6; 29:44.4	0 4; 0 0; 0 3; 0 0; 0 1	+15:17.3
17	9	Hungary; Anna Bozsik; Brigitta Bereczki; Éva Szemcsák; Beatrix Holéczy	2:08:27.6; 31:37.1; 32:11.0; 31:49.9; 32:49.6	0 5; 0 2; 0 2; 0 1; 0 0	+21:08.1
