= 1990–91 Biathlon World Cup =

Biathlon competition

1990–91 World Cup
Discipline	Men	Women
Overall	(Soviet Union) Sergei Tchepikov	(Soviet Union) Svetlana Davidova
Nations Cup	Italy	Germany
Individual	(Germany) Mark Kirchner	(Soviet Union) Svetlana Davidova
Sprint	(Soviet Union) Sergei Tchepikov	(Germany) Uschi Disl

Competition

The 1990–91 Biathlon World Cup was a multi-race tournament over a season of biathlon, organised by the UIPMB (Union Internationale de Pentathlon Moderne et Biathlon). The season started on 13 December 1990 in Albertville, France, and ended on 17 March 1991 in Canmore, Canada. It was the 14th season of the Biathlon World Cup.

== Calendar ==
Below is the World Cup calendar for the 1990–91 season.

Location	Date	Individual	Sprint	Team event	Relay
(France) Albertville	13–16 December	●	●		●
(Germany) Ruhpolding	17–20 January	●	●	●	
(Italy) Antholz-Anterselva	24–27 January	●	●		●
(Germany) Oberhof	31 January–3 February	●	●		●
(Finland) Lahti	19–24 February	●	●	●	●
(Norway) Holmenkollen	7–10 March	●	●		●
(Canada) Canmore	14–17 March	●	●	●	
Total		7	7	3	5

- 1991 World Championship races were not included in the 1990–91 World Cup scoring system.
- The relays were technically unofficial races as they did not count towards anything in the World Cup.

== World Cup Podium ==
=== Men ===
Stage	Date	Place	Discipline	Winner	Second	Third	Yellow bib (After competition)	Det.
1	13 December 1990	(France) Albertville	20 km Individual	(Soviet Union) Sergei Tchepikov	(Soviet Union) Anatoly Zhdanovich	(Germany) Frank-Peter Roetsch	(Soviet Union) Sergei Tchepikov	
1	15 December 1990	(France) Albertville	10 km Sprint	(Soviet Union) Sergei Tchepikov	(Germany) Frank Luck	(Italy) Andreas Zingerle	(Soviet Union) Sergei Tchepikov	
2	17 January 1991	(Germany) Ruhpolding	20 km Individual	(Italy) Pieralberto Carrara	(Italy) Andreas Zingerle	(Norway) Eirik Kvalfoss	(Italy) Andreas Zingerle	
2	19 January 1991	(Germany) Ruhpolding	10 km Sprint	(Soviet Union) Sergei Tarasov	(Italy) Pieralberto Carrara	(Norway) Frode Løberg	(Soviet Union) Sergei Tchepikov	
3	24 January 1991	(Italy) Antholz-Anterselva	20 km Individual	(Soviet Union) Alexandr Popov	(Soviet Union) Sergei Tchepikov	(France) Christian Dumont	(Soviet Union) Sergei Tchepikov	
3	26 January 1991	(Italy) Antholz-Anterselva	10 km Sprint	(Soviet Union) Sergei Tchepikov	(Italy) Andreas Zingerle	(Germany) Mark Kirchner	(Soviet Union) Sergei Tchepikov	
4	31 January 1991	(Germany) Oberhof	20 km Individual	(Germany) Mark Kirchner	(Germany) Frank Luck	(Italy) Pieralberto Carrara	(Soviet Union) Sergei Tchepikov	
4	2 February 1991	(Germany) Oberhof	10 km Sprint	(Germany) Frank Luck	(Germany) Ricco Groß	(Italy) Andreas Zingerle	(Italy) Andreas Zingerle	
5	7 March 1991	(Norway) Oslo Holmenkollen	20 km Individual	(Germany) Mark Kirchner	(Austria) Franz Schuler	(France) Stéphane Bouthiaux	(Italy) Andreas Zingerle	
5	9 March 1991	(Norway) Oslo Holmenkollen	10 km Sprint	(Norway) Geir Einang	(Soviet Union) Sergei Tarasov	(Norway) Frode Løberg	(Soviet Union) Sergei Tchepikov	
6	14 March 1991	(Canada) Canmore	20 km Individual	(France) Hervé Flandin	(France) Patrice Bailly-Salins	(United States) Josh Thompson	(Soviet Union) Sergei Tchepikov	
6	16 March 1991	(Canada) Canmore	10 km Sprint	(Norway) Eirik Kvalfoss	(Italy) Hubert Leitgeb	(Germany) Mark Kirchner	(Soviet Union) Sergei Tchepikov	

=== Women ===
Stage	Date	Place	Discipline	Winner	Second	Third	Yellow bib (After competition)	Det.
1	13 December 1990	(France) Les Saisies	15 km Individual	(Soviet Union) Elena Golovina	(Soviet Union) Svetlana Davidova	(Soviet Union) Irina Agolakova	(Soviet Union) Elena Golovina	Detail
1	15 December 1990	(France) Les Saisies	7.5 km Sprint	(Germany) Uschi Disl	(Soviet Union) Elena Melnikova	(Germany) Kerstin Moring	(Soviet Union) Elena Golovina	Detail
2	17 January 1991	(Germany) Ruhpolding	15 km Individual	(Soviet Union) Elena Golovina	(France) Véronique Claudel	(Germany) Antje Misersky	(Soviet Union) Elena Golovina	Detail
2	19 January 1991	(Germany) Ruhpolding	7.5 km Sprint	(Canada) Myriam Bédard	(Germany) Uschi Disl	(Soviet Union) Svetlana Davidova	(Soviet Union) Elena Golovina	Detail
3	24 January 1991	(Italy) Antholz-Anterselva	15 km Individual	(Soviet Union) Svetlana Davidova	(Germany) Petra Schaaf	(Norway) Anne Elvebakk	(Soviet Union) Svetlana Davidova	Detail
3	26 January 1991	(Italy) Antholz-Anterselva	7.5 km Sprint	(Norway) Anne Elvebakk	(Norway) Grete Ingeborg Nykkelmo	(Soviet Union) Irina Agolakova	(Soviet Union) Svetlana Davidova	Detail
4	31 January 1991	(Germany) Oberhof	15 km Individual	(Canada) Myriam Bédard	(Germany) Uschi Disl	(Norway) Anne Elvebakk	(Soviet Union) Svetlana Davidova	Detail
4	2 February 1991	(Germany) Oberhof	7.5 km Sprint	(Norway) Elin Kristiansen	(Canada) Yvonne Visser	(Norway) Hildegunn Fossen	(Norway) Anne Elvebakk	Detail
5	7 March 1991	(Norway) Oslo Holmenkollen	15 km Individual	(Germany) Antje Misersky	(Canada) Myriam Bédard	(Soviet Union) Svetlana Davidova	(Soviet Union) Svetlana Davidova	Detail
5	9 March 1991	(Norway) Oslo Holmenkollen	7.5 km Sprint	(Norway) Grete Ingeborg Nykkelmo	(Germany) Uschi Disl	(Soviet Union) Svetlana Davidova	(Soviet Union) Svetlana Davidova	Detail
6	14 March 1991	(Canada) Canmore	15 km Individual	(Norway) Elin Kristiansen	(Soviet Union) Svetlana Davidova	(Canada) Myriam Bédard	(Soviet Union) Svetlana Davidova	Detail
6	16 March 1991	(Canada) Canmore	7.5 km Sprint	(Soviet Union) Svetlana Davidova	(Canada) Myriam Bédard	(Norway) Elin Kristiansen	(Soviet Union) Svetlana Davidova	Detail

=== Men's team ===
Event	Date	Place	Discipline	Winner	Second	Third
1	16 December 1990	(France) Les Saisies	4x7.5 km Relay	Soviet Union Valeriy Noskov; Juri Kashkarov; Sergei Tchepikov; Alexander Popov	Norway Geir Einang; Sverre Istad; Jon Åge Tyldum; Gisle Fenne	Italy Wilfried Pallhuber; Hubert Leitgeb; Johann Passler; Andreas Zingerle
2	20 January 1991	(Germany) Ruhpolding	Team event	Soviet Union Sergei Tarasov; Valeriy Medvedtsev; Anatoly Zhdanovich; Sergei Tchepikov	Italy Elmar Mutschlechner; Edmund Zitturi; Simon Demetz; Hubert Leitgeb	Norway Ivar Ulekleiv; Geir Einang; Sylfest Glimsdal; Frode Løberg
3	27 January 1991	(Italy) Antholz	4x7.5 km Relay	Soviet Union Juri Kashkarov; Alexander Popov; Sergei Tarasov; Sergei Tchepikov	Italy Pieralberto Carrara; Johann Passler; Wilfried Pallhuber; Andreas Zingerle	Germany Ricco Gross; Frank Luck; Mark Kirchner; Fritz Fischer
4	3 February 1991	(Germany) Oberhof	4x7.5 km Relay	Germany Ricco Gross; Frank Luck; Mark Kirchner; Fritz Fischer	Italy Pieralberto Carrara; Johann Passler; Hubert Leitgeb; Andreas Zingerle	Norway Sverre Istad; Ivar Ulekleiv; Jon Åge Tyldum; Frode Løberg
5	10 March 1991	(Norway) Oslo	4x7.5 km Relay	Soviet Union Valeri Kiriyenko; Sergei Tchepikov; Sergei Tarasov; Alexander Popov	Norway Geir Einang; Eirik Kvalfoss; Frode Løberg; Gisle Fenne	Germany Ricco Gross; André Sehmisch; Mark Kirchner; Fritz Fischer
6	17 March 1991	(Canada) Canmore	Team event	Germany Fritz Fischer; Ricco Gross; Frank Luck; Mark Kirchner	Norway Geir Einang; Jon Åge Tyldum; Eirik Kvalfoss; Gisle Fenne	Italy Hubert Leitgeb; Gottlieb Taschler; Simon Demetz; Wilfried Pallhuber

=== Women's team ===
Event	Date	Place	Discipline	Winner	Second	Third
1	16 December 1990	(France) Albertville	3x6 km Relay	Germany Uschi Disl; Kerstin Moring; Antje Misersky	Norway Signe Trosten; Anne Elvebakk; Synnøve Thoresen	Finland Tuija Vuoksiala; Pirjo Mattila; Seija Hyytiäinen
3	27 January 1991	(Italy) Antholz	3x6 km Relay	Soviet Union Elena Belova; Elena Golovina; Irina Agolakova	Germany Uschi Disl; Inga Kesper; Petra Schaaf	Sweden Inger Björkbom; Christina Eklund; Mia Stadig
4	3 February 1991	(Germany) Oberhof	3x6 km Relay	Germany Uschi Disl; Inga Kesper; Petra Schaaf	Norway Signe Trosten; Hildegunn Fossen; Unni Kristiansen	Czechoslovakia Petra Nosková; Jiřina Adamičková; Jana Vápeníková
5	10 March 1991	(Norway) Oslo	3x6 km Relay	Germany Uschi Disl; Inga Kesper; Petra Schaaf	Soviet Union Elena Belova; Nadezhda Talanova; Irina Agolakova	Norway Grete Ingeborg Nykkelmo; Anne Elvebakk; Elin Kristiansen

== Standings: Men ==
=== Overall ===
Pos.		Points
1.	(Soviet Union) Sergei Tchepikov	191
2.	(Germany) Mark Kirchner	183
3.	(Italy) Andreas Zingerle	174
4.	(Germany) Frank Luck	156
5.	(Italy) Pieralberto Carrara	147

- Final standings after 12 races.

=== Individual ===
Pos.		Points
1.	(Germany) Mark Kirchner	99
2.	(Soviet Union) Sergei Tchepikov	87
3.	(Italy) Andreas Zingerle	79
4.	(Norway) Gisle Fenne	79
5.	(France) Patrice Bailly-Salins	74

- Final standings after 6 races.

=== Sprint ===
Pos.		Points
1.	(Soviet Union) Sergei Tchepikov	104
2.	(Italy) Andreas Zingerle	95
3.	(Soviet Union) Sergei Tarasov	90
4.	(Germany) Frank Luck	86
5.	(Germany) Mark Kirchner	84

- Final standings after 6 races.

=== Nation ===
Pos.		Points
1.	Italy	5682
2.	Germany	5659
3.	France	5383
4.	Norway	5288
5.	Soviet Union	4557

- Final standings after 16 races.

== Standings: Women ==
=== Overall ===
Pos.		Points
1.	(Soviet Union) Svetlana Davidova	204
2.	(Canada) Myriam Bédard	192
3.	(Norway) Anne Elvebakk	178
4.	(Germany) Uschi Disl	174
5.	(Germany) Antje Misersky	162

- Final standings after 12 races.

=== Individual ===
Pos.		Points
1.	(Soviet Union) Svetlana Davidova	106
2.	(Canada) Myriam Bédard	99
3.	(Germany) Antje Misersky	92
4.	(Norway) Anne Elvebakk	91
5.	(France) Véronique Claudel	81

- Final standings after 6 races.

=== Sprint ===
Pos.		Points
1.	(Germany) Uschi Disl	102
2.	(Soviet Union) Svetlana Davidova	98
3.	(Canada) Myriam Bédard	93
4.	(Norway) Anne Elvebakk	87
5.	(Norway) Elin Kristiansen	73

- Final standings after 6 races.

=== Nation ===
Pos.		Points
1.	Germany	5805
2.	Norway	5586
3.	France	5403
4.	Soviet Union	5397
5.	Finland	4992

- Final standings after 16 races.

== Medal table ==
Rank	Nation	Gold	Silver	Bronze	Total
1	Soviet Union	13	7	5	25
2	Germany	9	8	7	24
3	Norway	6	5	9	20
4	Canada	2	3	1	6
5	Italy	1	6	4	11
6	France	1	2	2	5
7	Austria	0	1	0	1
8	Czechoslovakia	0	0	1	1
8	Finland	0	0	1	1
8	Sweden	0	0	1	1
8	United States	0	0	1	1
Totals (11 entries)		32	32	32	96

== Achievements ==
=== Men ===
First World Cup career victory

- Pieralberto Carrara (ITA), 24, in his 7th season — the WC 2 Individual in Ruhpolding; it also was his first podium
- Sergei Tarasov (URS), 25, in his 2nd season — the WC 2 Sprint in Ruhpolding; first podium was the 1989–90 Sprint in Obertilliach
- Geir Einang (NOR), 26, in his 7th season — the WC 5 Sprint in Holmenkollen; first podium was the 1987–88 Sprint in Holmenkollen
- Hervé Flandin (FRA), 25, in his 6th season — the WC 6 Individual in Canmore; first podium was the 1987–88 Individual in Antholz-Anterselva

First World Cup podium

- Christian Dumont (FRA), 27, in his 8th season — no. 3 in the WC 3 Individual in Antholz-Anterselva
- Ricco Groß (GER), 20, in his 1st season — no. 2 in the WC 4 Sprint in Oberhof
- Stéphane Bouthiaux (FRA), 24, in his 4th season — no. 3 in the WC 5 Individual in Holmenkollen
- Patrice Bailly-Salins (FRA), 26, in his 3rd season — no. 2 in the WC 6 Individual in Canmore
- Josh Thompson (USA), 29, — no. 3 in the WC 6 Individual in Canmore
- Hubert Leitgeb (ITA), 25, in his 5th season — no. 2 in the WC 6 Sprint in Canmore

Victory in this World Cup (all-time number of victories in parentheses)

- Sergei Tchepikov (URS), 3 (5) first places
- Mark Kirchner (GER), 2 (3) first places
- Eirik Kvalfoss (NOR), 1 (12) first place
- Alexandr Popov (URS), 1 (3) first place
- Frank Luck (GER), 1 (2) first place
- Pieralberto Carrara (ITA), 1 (1) first place
- Sergei Tarasov (URS), 1 (1) first place
- Geir Einang (NOR), 1 (1) first place
- Hervé Flandin (FRA), 1 (1) first place

=== Women ===
Victory in this World Cup (all-time number of victories in parentheses)

- Elena Golovina (URS), 2 (7) first places
- Svetlana Davidova (URS), 2 (4) first places
- Myriam Bédard (CAN), 2 (2) first places
- Elin Kristiansen (NOR), 2 (2) first places
- Anne Elvebakk (NOR), 1 (4) first place
- Uschi Disl (GER), 1 (1) first place
- Antje Misersky (GER), 1 (1) first place
- Grete Ingeborg Nykkelmo (NOR), 1 (1) first place

== Retirements ==
Following notable biathletes retired after the 1990–91 season:

- André Sehmisch (GER)
- Lars Wiklund (SWE)
- Jan Matouš (TCH)
- Juri Kashkarov (URS)
- Martina Stede (GER)
- Synnove Thoresen (NOR)
