= Biathlon World Championships 1995 =

Sports competition in Antholz-Anterselva, Italy

- Host city: Anterselva
- Country: Italy
- Events: 8
- Opening: 16 February 1995
- Closing: 19 February 1995

The 30th Biathlon World Championships were held in 1995 for the third time in Antholz-Anterselva, Italy.

== Men's results ==
=== 20 km individual ===
Medal	Nation	Name	Result	Penalties
1	Poland	Tomasz Sikora	1:01:36,0	0
2	Norway	Jon Åge Tyldum	1:02:10,6	0
3	Belarus	Oleg Ryzhenkov	1:02:16,4	2
4	Ukraine	Roman Zvonkov	1:02:16,9	0
5	Russia	Vladimir Drachev	1:02:35,4	3
6	Norway	Kjell Ove Oftedal	1:03:15,6	1
7	France	Patrice Bailly-Salins	1:03:21,3	1
8	Russia	Eduard Ryabov	1:03:30,0	1

=== 10 km sprint ===
Medal	Nation	Name	Result	Penalties
1	France	Patrice Bailly-Salins	29:23,8	1
2	Russia	Pavel Mouslimov	29:25,7	0
3	Germany	Ricco Groß	29:29,0	0
4	Norway	Ole Einar Bjørndalen	29:31,1	1
5	Italy	Patrick Favre	29:41,7	1
6	Belarus	Alexandr Popov	29:54,9	1
7	France	Hervé Flandin	29:57,2	1
8	Germany	Frank Luck	29:57,2	0

=== Team event ===
Medal	Nation	Name	Result	Penalties
1	Norway	Frode Andresen; Dag Bjørndalen; Halvard Hanevold; Jon Åge Tyldum		
2	Czech Republic	Petr Garabík; Roman Dostál; Jiří Holubec; Ivan Masařík		
3	France	Thierry Dusserre; Franck Perrot; Lionel Laurent; Stéphane Bouthiaux		

=== 4 × 7.5 km relay ===
Medal	Nation	Name	Result	Penalties
1	Germany	Ricco Groß; Mark Kirchner; Frank Luck; Sven Fischer	1:23:29,0	0
2	France	Lionel Laurent; Patrice Bailly-Salins; Thierry Dusserre; Hervé Flandin	1:23:41,9	0
3	Belarus	Igor Chochrjakow; Alexandr Popov; Oleg Ryzhenkov; Vadim Sashurin	1:24:06,0	0
4	Italy	Hubert Leitgeb; Wilfried Pallhuber; Patrick Favre; Pieralberto Carrara	1:24:34,5	2
5	Norway	Ole Einar Bjørndalen; Jon Åge Tyldum; Frode Andresen; Kjell Ove Oftedal	1:24:41,0	1
6	Sweden	Ulf Johansson; Mikael Lofgren; Jonas Eriksson; Fredrik Kuoppa	1:25:18,5	1
7	Poland	Wiesław Ziemianin; Jan Ziemianin; Tomasz Sikora; Jan Wojtas	1:25:42,5	1
8	Russia	Alexei Kobelev; Pavel Mouslimov; Eduard Ryabov; Vladimir Drachev	1:25:53,5	0

== Women's results ==
=== 15 km individual ===
Medal	Nation	Name	Result	Penalties
1	France	Corinne Niogret	51:16,3	1
2	Germany	Uschi Disl	51:28,7	1
3	Bulgaria	Ekaterina Dafovska	52:10,6	0
4	Belarus	Svetlana Paramygina	52:40,0	1
5	Ukraine	Valentina Tserbe-Nessina	52:53,3	1
6	France	Anne Briand	53:03,6	3
7	Sweden	Magdalena Forsberg	53:07,7	0
8	China	Aigin Song	53:31,9	1

=== 7.5 km sprint ===
Medal	Nation	Name	Result	Penalties
1	France	Anne Briand	24:00,6	1
2	Germany	Uschi Disl	24:05,9	0
3	France	Corinne Niogret	24:07,0	2
4	Slovakia	Sona Mihokova	24:22,5	2
5	France	Emmanuelle Claret	24:28,1	1
6	Slovenia	Andreja Grašič-Koblar	24:37,7	2
7	Italy	Nathalie Santer	24:37,5	2
8	Belarus	Natalia Permiakowa	24:39,7	1

=== Team event ===
Medal	Nation	Name	Result	Penalties
1	Norway	Elin Kristiansen; Annette Sikveland; Gunn Margit Andreassen; Ann Elen Skjelbreid		
2	Germany	Kathi Schwaab; Simone Greiner-Petter-Memm; Uschi Disl; Petra Behle		
3	France	Emmanuelle Claret; Véronique Claudel; Anne Briand; Corinne Niogret		

=== 4 × 7.5 km relay ===
Medal	Nation	Name	Result	Penalties
1	Germany	Uschi Disl; Antje Harvey; Simone Greiner-Petter-Memm; Petra Schaaf	1:37:05,0	0
2	France	Corinne Niogret; Véronique Claudel; Delphyne Heymann; Anne Briand	1:37:38,4	0
3	Norway	Ann Elen Skjelbreid; Hildegunn Fossen; Annette Sikveland; Gunn Margit Andreassen	1:37:39,3	2
4	Slovakia	Martina Halinarova; Erika Lehotska; Anna Murinova; Sona Mihokova	1:39:55,1	0
5	Ukraine	Tatjana Vodopjanova; Nina Lemesh; Olena Petrova; Valentina Tserbe-Nessina	1:40:28,3	0
6	Russia	Swetlana Paniutina; Nadezhda Talanova; Swetlana Petscherskaja; Anfisa Reztsova	1:40:35,9	2
7	Bulgaria	Ekaterina Dafovska; Nadeschda Alexiewa; Radka Popola; Iva Karagiozowa	1:41:49,7	7
8	United States	Kristina Sabasteanski; Stacey Wooley; Beth Coats; Ntala Skinner	1:42:00,8	1

== Medal table ==
Place	Nation	1st place, gold medalist(s)	2nd place, silver medalist(s)	3rd place, bronze medalist(s)	Total
1	France	3	2	3	8
2	Germany	2	3	1	6
3	Norway	2	1	1	4
4	Poland	1	0	0	1
5	Czech Republic	0	1	0	1
5	Russia	0	1	0	1
7	Belarus	0	0	2	2
8	Bulgaria	0	0	1	1
