= Biathlon at the 1998 Winter Olympics – Women's individual =

Women's biathlon individual at the XVIII Olympic Winter Games
- Venue: Nozawa Onsen
- Dates: 9 February 1998
- Competitors: 64 from 24 nations
- Winning time: 54:52.0

Medalists
1st place, gold medalist(s)		Ekaterina Dafovska	Bulgaria
2nd place, silver medalist(s)		Olena Petrova	Ukraine
3rd place, bronze medalist(s)		Uschi Disl	Germany

The Women's 15 kilometre individual biathlon competition at the 1998 Winter Olympics was held on 9 February, at Nozawa Onsen. Competitors raced over five loops of a 3.0 kilometre skiing course, shooting four times, twice prone and twice standing. Each miss resulted in one minute being added to a competitor's skiing time.

== Results ==
Rank	Bib	Name	Country	Result	Penalties	Deficit
1st place, gold medalist(s)	18	Ekaterina Dafovska	Bulgaria	54:52.0	1 (0+0+1+0)	–
2nd place, silver medalist(s)	35	Olena Petrova	Ukraine	55:09.8	1 (1+0+0+0)	+17.8
3rd place, bronze medalist(s)	26	Uschi Disl	Germany	55:17.9	1 (0+0+0+1)	+25.9
4	30	Pavlina Filipova	Bulgaria	55:18.1	1 (0+0+0+1)	+26.1
5	41	Andreja Grašič	Slovenia	56:01.0	4 (1+0+1+2)	+1:09.0
6	51	Ryoko Takahashi	Japan	56:17.4	3 (1+0+1+1)	+1:25.4
7	32	Albina Akhatova	Russia	56:21.7	1 (0+0+0+1)	+1:29.7
8	7	Annette Sikveland	Norway	56:38.7	3 (0+0+2+1)	+1:46.7
9	21	Yu Shumei	China	56:41.3	2 (0+1+1+0)	+1:49.3
10	52	Martina Zellner	Germany	56:46.3	4 (1+2+1+0)	+1:54.3
11	22	Éva Tófalvi	Romania	56:48.6	1 (0+0+1+0)	+1:56.6
12	62	Svetlana Paramygina	Belarus	56:53.4	2 (0+0+2+0)	+2:01.4
13	57	Olga Melnik	Russia	57:10.8	2 (0+0+2+0)	+2:18.8
14	43	Magdalena Forsberg	Sweden	57:16.9	3 (0+1+2+0)	+2:24.9
15	50	Liv Grete Skjelbreid	Norway	57:21.2	5 (0+3+1+1)	+2:29.2
16	64	Corinne Niogret	France	57:51.1	1 (0+0+0+1)	+2:59.1
17	40	Anna Stera	Poland	57:56.0	2 (0+0+0+2)	+3:04.0
18	46	Nathalie Santer	Italy	58:01.0	4 (2+1+1+0)	+3:09.0
19	38	Nataliya Ryzhenkova	Belarus	58:03.5	3 (0+2+1+0)	+3:11.5
20	19	Anne Briand-Bouthiaux	France	58:13.1	3 (0+0+0+3)	+3:21.1
21	49	Sun Ribo	China	58:19.2	6 (2+2+0+2)	+3:27.2
22	28	Irina Tananayko	Belarus	58:25.4	1 (0+1+0+0)	+3:33.4
23	47	Lyudmila Guryeva	Kazakhstan	58:42.8	4 (1+0+2+1)	+3:50.8
24	14	Tetyana Vodopyanova	Ukraine	58:45.9	3 (1+1+1+0)	+3:53.9
25	29	Ieva Cederštrēma	Latvia	58:54.4	1 (0+0+1+0)	+4:02.4
26	33	Soňa Mihoková	Slovakia	59:20.8	3 (1+1+0+1)	+4:28.8
27	44	Petra Behle	Germany	59:29.7	1 (0+0+1+0)	+4:37.7
28	3	Olena Zubrilova	Ukraine	59:43.0	2 (2+0+0+0)	+4:51.0
29	23	Mami Honma	Japan	59:59.3	4 (0+0+0+4)	+5:07.3
30	53	Irena Novotná	Czech Republic	1:00:09.0	3 (1+0+1+1)	+5:17.0
31	5	Galina Kukleva	Russia	1:00:29.2	6 (1+2+3+0)	+5:37.2
32	39	Mari Lampinen	Finland	1:00:55.2	5 (0+2+0+3)	+6:03.2
33	11	Olga Romasko	Russia	1:00:58.8	3 (3+0+0+0)	+6:06.8
34	20	Ann Elen Skjelbreid	Norway	1:01:00.3	7 (2+1+1+3)	+6:08.3
35	60	Lucija Larisi	Slovenia	1:01:05.8	6 (1+1+2+2)	+6:13.8
36	16	Tadeja Brankovič	Slovenia	1:01:19.1	8 (3+2+2+1)	+6:27.1
37	48	Hiromi Seino	Japan	1:01:21.9	7 (3+0+2+2)	+6:29.9
38	6	Jiřína Pelcová	Czech Republic	1:01:26.3	3 (1+1+0+1)	+6:34.3
39	2	Katja Beer	Germany	1:01:26.4	4 (0+1+2+1)	+6:34.4
40	63	Gunn Margit Andreassen	Norway	1:01:28.5	5 (0+1+3+1)	+6:36.5
41	8	Nataliya Permyakova	Belarus	1:01:33.5	3 (1+2+0+0)	+6:41.5
42	56	Agata Suszka	Poland	1:01:35.4	6 (2+0+2+2)	+6:43.4
43	45	Kerryn Rim	Australia	1:01:38.1	4 (0+3+0+1)	+6:46.1
44	36	Kateřina Losmanová	Czech Republic	1:01:48.9	1 (1+0+0+0)	+6:56.9
45	24	Katja Holanti	Finland	1:01:50.9	3 (0+1+0+2)	+6:58.9
46	17	Martina Schwarzbacherová	Slovakia	1:01:56.5	5 (2+1+2+0)	+7:04.5
47	59	Valentina Tserbe-Nessina	Ukraine	1:01:58.8	4 (0+3+1+0)	+7:06.8
48	54	Anna Murínová	Slovakia	1:02:06.7	2 (0+1+1+0)	+7:14.7
49	58	Maria Schylander	Sweden	1:02:35.0	4 (1+1+0+2)	+7:43.0
50	31	Myriam Bédard	Canada	1:02:44.1	3 (1+0+1+1)	+7:52.1
51	15	Halina Pitoń	Poland	1:02:45.0	6 (2+0+2+2)	+7:53.0
52	1	Eva-Karin Westin	Sweden	1:03:00.5	2 (1+1+0+0)	+8:08.5
53	13	Eva Háková	Czech Republic	1:03:25.4	6 (2+2+1+1)	+8:33.4
54	55	Inna Sheshkil	Kazakhstan	1:03:27.7	7 (2+2+2+1)	+8:35.7
55	25	Stacey Wooley	United States	1:03:57.3	2 (1+1+0+0)	+9:05.3
56	61	Kara Salmela	United States	1:04:43.7	5 (1+0+3+1)	+9:51.7
57	34	Anna Bozsik	Hungary	1:05:41.1	6 (2+3+1+0)	+10:49.1
58	27	Éva Szemcsák	Hungary	1:05:51.8	5 (0+1+3+1)	+10:59.8
59	9	Christelle Gros	France	1:06:33.8	7 (2+1+1+3)	+11:41.8
60	10	Nikki Keddie	Canada	1:08:46.5	5 (1+1+1+2)	+13:54.5
61	42	Ntala Skinner	United States	1:09:09.0	3 (1+0+0+2)	+14:17.0
62	4	Elena Gorohova	Moldova	1:09:18.1	9 (3+0+2+4)	+14:26.1
63	37	Florence Baverel	France	1:09:42.8	4 (0+0+1+3)	+14:50.8
64	12	Kristina Brounéus	Sweden	1:09:51.1	5 (0+2+2+1)	+14:59.1
