= 1990–91 Biathlon World Cup – Overall Men =

These are the rankings for the 1990-91 Biathlon World Cup for men. For each event, first place gives 30 points, 2nd place 26 pts, 3rd place 24 pts, 4th place 22 pts, then linearly decreasing by one point down to 25th place. Equal placings (ties) give an equal number of points. The sum of all WC points of the season minus the two worst results in each of the disciplines gives the biathlete's total WC score.

== 1989–90 Top 3 Standings ==
Medal	Athlete	Points
Gold:	(Soviet Union) Sergei Tchepikov	196
Silver:	(Norway) Eirik Kvalfoss	192
Bronze:	(Soviet Union) Valeriy Medvedtsev	161

== Standings ==
#	Name	ALB IN	ALB SP	RUH IN	RUH SP	ANT IN	ANT SP	OBE IN	OBE SP	OSL IN	OSL SP	CAN IN	CAN SP	Total
1.	Sergei Tchepikov (URS)	30	30	9	22	26	30	—	—	~~0~~	22	22	~~7~~	191
2	Mark Kirchner (GER)	20	15	~~18~~	~~10~~	~~0~~	24	30	~~12~~	30	21	19	24	183
3	Andreas Zingerle (ITA)	19	24	26	21	18	26	~~16~~	24	~~1~~	~~11~~	16	~~9~~	174
4	Frank Luck (GER)	21	26	20	~~7~~	~~0~~	11	26	30	—	—	3	19	156
5	Pieralberto Carrara (ITA)	~~0~~	~~0~~	30	26	~~0~~	16	24	22	10	~~0~~	9	10	147
6	Gisle Fenne (NOR)	22	22	~~12~~	—	22	13	—	—	22	12	13	18	144
7	Ricco Groß (GER)	4	~~0~~	~~0~~	4	9	15	18	26	~~0~~	~~0~~	20	22	118
8	Wilfried Pallhuber (ITA)	5	18	~~0~~	6	19	20	20	11	~~0~~	~~2~~	18	~~0~~	117
9	Sergei Tarasov (URS)	0	13	2	30	2	21	—	—	20	26	—	—	114
10	Franz Schuler (AUT)	16	20	~~0~~	~~2~~	8	~~0~~	~~0~~	9	26	3	15	17	114
11	Eirik Kvalfoss (NOR)	0	—	24	1	14	18	—	—	~~2~~	19	5	30	112
12	Frode Løberg (NOR)	0	~~0~~	14	24	—	—	—	6	18	24	17	5	108
13	Hubert Leitgeb (ITA)	~~0~~	0	16	15	12	~~0~~	19	13	5	—	~~0~~	26	106
14	Fritz Fischer (GER)	7	~~0~~	21	—	~~0~~	17	—	21	12	10	2	15	105
15	Patrice Bailly-Salins (FRA)	~~8~~	5	17	~~0~~	15	3	—	—	16	0	26	21	103
16	Jon Åge Tyldum (NOR)	15	16	—	—	~~0~~	~~0~~	15	1	21	20	0	11	99
17	Geir Einang (NOR)	~~0~~	19	13	16	0	~~9~~	—	—	0	30	6	14	98
18	Christian Dumont (FRA)	18	~~0~~	0	9	24	14	—	—	15	0	~~0~~	16	96
19	André Sehmisch (GER)	~~2~~	9	~~0~~	~~0~~	13	~~0~~	4	14	17	0	21	13	91
20	Johann Passler (ITA)	~~0~~	6	~~0~~	20	0	19	9	20	0	—	12	~~0~~	86
21	Alexandr Popov (URS)	—	17	5	19	30	0	—	—	0	14	—	—	85
22	Josh Thompson (USA)	—	—	0	0	—	0	17	19	—	—	24	20	80
23	Hervé Flandin (FRA)	10	~~0~~	~~0~~	0	0	11	—	—	6	17	30	0	74
24	Valeriy Medvedtsev (URS)	9	2	22	17	21	0	—	—	—	—	—	—	71
25	Anatoly Zhdanovich (URS)	26	11	19	0	0	12	—	—	—	—	—	—	68
26	Andreas Heymann (FRA)	13	~~0~~	—	13	0	0	13	18	0	8	—	—	65
27	Frank-Peter Roetsch (GER)	24	0	7	11	0	0	21	0	—	—	—	—	63
28	Stéphane Bouthiaux (FRA)	17	~~0~~	6	5	3	0	—	—	24	5	~~0~~	0	60
29	Gilles Marguet (FRA)	12	8	~~0~~	~~0~~	5	0	—	—	9	0	14	8	56
30	Juri Kashkarov (URS)	0	21	0	0	6	22	—	—	—	—	—	—	49
#	Name	ALB IN	ALB SP	RUH IN	RUH SP	ANT IN	ANT SP	OBE IN	OBE SP	OSL IN	OSL SP	CAN IN	CAN SP	Total
