= Kulhavý =

Kulhavý (Czech feminine: Kulhavá) is a Czech surname meaning literally "a limping person". Notable people include:

- Bedřiška Kulhavá (born 1931), Czech middle-distance runner
- Jana Kulhavá (born 1964), Czech biathlete
- Jaroslav Kulhavý (born 1985), Czech mountain biker
