= Silvio Memm =

German Nordic combined skier

Silvio Memm is a German former Nordic combined skier who competed in the early 1980s. His best career finish was tenth twice in the 15 km individual events (1984, 1985).

Memm is married to Simone Greiner-Petter-Memm, who competed in biathlon and cross-country skiing for East Germany and Germany from 1987 to 2000.
