= Uschi Disl =

German biathlete (born 1970)

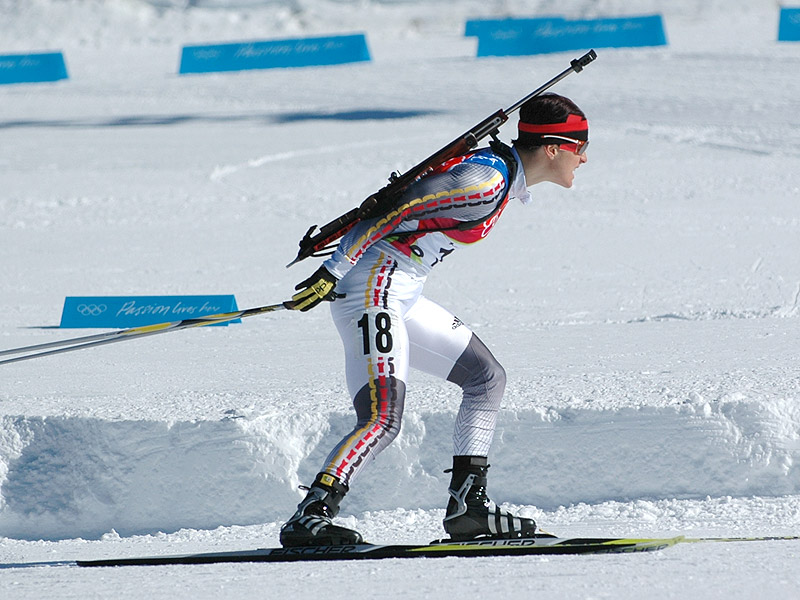

Personal information
- Full name: Ursula Disl
- Born: 15 November 1970 (age 55) Bad Tölz, West Germany
- Height: 1.63 m (5 ft 4 in)

Sport
- Sport: Skiing

World Cup career
- Seasons: 1990/91 – 2005/06
- Indiv. podiums: 74
- Indiv. wins: 30
Medal record
Women's biathlon
Representing Germany
Event	1st	2nd	3rd
Olympic Games (9 medals)	2	4	3
World Championships (19 medals)	8	8	3
Total (28 medals)	10	12	6
Olympic Games
Gold medal – first place	1998 Nagano	4 × 7.5 km relay
Gold medal – first place	2002 Salt Lake City	4 × 7.5 km relay
Silver medal – second place	1992 Albertville	3 × 7.5 km relay
Silver medal – second place	1994 Lillehammer	4 × 7.5 km relay
Silver medal – second place	1998 Nagano	7.5 km sprint
Silver medal – second place	2002 Salt Lake City	7.5 km sprint
Bronze medal – third place	1994 Lillehammer	15 km individual
Bronze medal – third place	1998 Nagano	15 km individual
Bronze medal – third place	2006 Turin	12.5 km mass start
World Championships
Gold medal – first place	1992 Novosibirsk	Team event
Gold medal – first place	1995 Antholz-Anterselva	4 × 7.5 km relay
Gold medal – first place	1996 Ruhpolding	Team event
Gold medal – first place	1996 Ruhpolding	4 × 7.5 km relay
Gold medal – first place	1997 Brezno-Osrblie	4 × 7.5 km relay
Gold medal – first place	1999 Kontiolahti	4 × 7.5 km relay
Gold medal – first place	2005 Hochfilzen	7.5 km sprint
Gold medal – first place	2005 Hochfilzen	10 km pursuit
Silver medal – second place	1995 Antholz-Anterselva	15 km individual
Silver medal – second place	1995 Antholz-Anterselva	7.5 km sprint
Silver medal – second place	1995 Antholz-Anterselva	Team event
Silver medal – second place	2000 Oslo	10 km pursuit
Silver medal – second place	2000 Oslo	4 × 7.5 km relay
Silver medal – second place	2001 Pokljuka	7.5 km sprint
Silver medal – second place	2001 Pokljuka	4 × 7.5 km relay
Silver medal – second place	2005 Hochfilzen	4 × 6 km relay
Bronze medal – third place	1991 Lahti	3 × 7.5 km relay
Bronze medal – third place	2003 Khanty-Mansiysk	4 × 6 km relay
Bronze medal – third place	2005 Khanty-Mansiysk	Mixed relay
- Updated on 18 February 2014

Ursula "Uschi" Disl (German pronunciation: [ˈʊʃi ˈdiːzl̩]; born 15 November 1970) is a German former biathlete.

== Career ==
During her competitive career Disl was a 19-year veteran of biathlon and was a five time olympian, with two Olympic gold medals from the 4 × 7.5 km relays in 1998 and 2002. She also has four silver medals (two in 7.5 km sprint (1998 and 2002), one in 4 × 7.5 km relay (1994), and one in 3 × 7.5 km relay (1992)), and three bronze medals (two in 15 km individual, 1994 and 1998, and one in 12.5 km mass start, 2006). She also has two World Championship individual titles, both won in Hochfilzen, Austria, in March 2005, in the 7.5 km sprint and the 10 km pursuit.

Dubbed "Turbo-Disl" by the German media, she lay second in the Biathlon World Cup table at the beginning of the Olympics behind fellow country-woman Kati Wilhelm, and finished fifth in the overall standings for the 2004/05 season. She has finished second overall three times in the Biathlon World Cup (1995/96, 1996/97 and 1997/98) and has won forty World Cup races (28 single and 12 relay/team victories). This includes three wins at the Holmenkollen ski festival biathlon competition with one in 1995 (sprint) and two in 1996 (sprint, pursuit).

2006 was Disl's last Olympics and her final season.

On 18 December 2005, Disl was named "German sportswoman of the year", becoming the first biathlete awarded, and beating speed skater Anni Friesinger and discus thrower Franka Dietzsch.

== Personal life ==
Since 2012 she resides with her Swedish husband Tomas Söderberg in the region of Dalarna in Sweden, they have a daughter and a son. Like many German Nordic skiers, Disl was working in the military as a border patrol guard during her sporting career. In 2022, Disl acquired Swedish citizenship and she also speaks the Swedish language fluently to the point that she became a biathlon expert on Swedish radio. She also served as biathlon coach at the local club, including for her own children, but citing that 'them having fun was more important than results'.

== Biathlon results ==
=== Olympic Games ===
9 medals (2 gold, 4 silver, 3 bronze)

Event	Individual	Sprint	Pursuit	Mass start	Relay
(France) 1992 Albertville	24th	11th	—N/a	—N/a	Silver
(Norway) 1994 Lillehammer	Bronze	13th	—N/a	—N/a	Silver
(Japan) 1998 Nagano	Bronze	Silver	—N/a	—N/a	Gold
(United States) 2002 Salt Lake City	12th	Silver	9th	—N/a	Gold
(Italy) 2006 Turin	12th	34th	10th	Bronze	—

*Pursuit was first added in 2002, mass start in 2006.

=== World Championships ===
19 medals (8 gold, 8 silver, 3 bronze)

Event	Individual	Sprint	Pursuit	Mass start	Team	Relay	Mixed relay
(Finland) 1991 Lahti	8th	5th	—N/a	—N/a	4th	Bronze	—N/a
(Russia) 1992 Novosibirsk	—	—	—N/a	—N/a	Gold	—	—N/a
(Bulgaria) 1993 Borovets	8th	34th	—N/a	—N/a	8th	4th	—N/a
(Canada) 1994 Canmore	—	—	—N/a	—N/a	4th	—	—N/a
(Italy) 1995 Antholz	Silver	Silver	—N/a	—N/a	Silver	Gold	—N/a
(Germany) 1996 Ruhpolding	27th	35th	—N/a	—N/a	Gold	Gold	—N/a
(Slovakia) 1997 Brezno-Osrblie	13th	13th	4th	—N/a	—	Gold	—N/a
(Slovenia) 1998 Pokljuka	—	—	15th	—N/a	—	—	—N/a
(Finland) 1999 Kontiolahti	9th	34th	11th	7th	—N/a	Gold	—N/a
(Norway) 2000 Oslo	8th	7th	Silver	8th	—N/a	Silver	—N/a
(Slovenia) 2001 Pokljuka	11th	Silver	11th	24th	—N/a	Silver	—N/a
(Russia) 2003 Khanty-Mansiysk	—	34th	13th	21st	—N/a	Bronze	—N/a
(Germany) 2004 Oberhof	—	—	—	9th	—N/a	—	—N/a
(Austria) 2005 Hochfilzen	34th	Gold	Gold	10th	—N/a	Silver	Bronze

*Team was removed as an event in 1998, and pursuit was added in 1997 with mass start being added in 1999 and the mixed relay in 2005.

=== World Cup ===
Season	Overall
1990–91	4th
1991–92	5th
1992–93	16th
1993–94	4th
1994–95	3rd
1995–96	2nd
1996–97	2nd
1997–98	2nd
1998–99	3rd
1999–00	8th
2000–01	6th
2001–02	3rd
2002–03	7th
2003–04	4th
2004–05	5th
2005–06	5th

=== Individual victories ===
30 victories (9 In, 12 Sp, 7 Pu, 2 MS)

Season	Date	Location	Discipline	Level
1990–91; 1 victory (1 Sp)	15 December 1990	(France) Albertville	7.5 km sprint	Biathlon World Cup
1991–92; 1 victory (1 In)	16 January 1992	(Germany) Ruhpolding	15 km individual	Biathlon World Cup
1993–94; 1 victory (1 In)	17 March 1994	(Canada) Canmore	15 km individual	Biathlon World Cup
1994–95; 1 victory (1 In)	19 January 1995	(Germany) Oberhof	15 km individual	Biathlon World Cup
1995–96; 4 victories (2 In, 2 Sp)	7 December 1995	(Sweden) Östersund	15 km individual	Biathlon World Cup
1995–96; 4 victories (2 In, 2 Sp)	16 December 1995	(Norway) Oslo Holmenkollen	7.5 km sprint	Biathlon World Cup
1995–96; 4 victories (2 In, 2 Sp)	11 January 1996	(Italy) Antholz-Anterselva	15 km individual	Biathlon World Cup
1995–96; 4 victories (2 In, 2 Sp)	13 January 1996	(Italy) Antholz-Anterselva	7.5 km sprint	Biathlon World Cup
1996–97; 3 victories (2 Sp, 1 Pu)	12 December 1996	(Norway) Oslo Holmenkollen	7.5 km sprint	Biathlon World Cup
1996–97; 3 victories (2 Sp, 1 Pu)	14 December 1996	(Norway) Oslo Holmenkollen	10 km pursuit	Biathlon World Cup
1996–97; 3 victories (2 Sp, 1 Pu)	18 January 1997	(Italy) Antholz-Anterselva	7.5 km sprint	Biathlon World Cup
1997–98; 3 victories (1 In, 2 Sp)	18 December 1997	(Finland) Kontiolahti	7.5 km sprint	Biathlon World Cup
1997–98; 3 victories (1 In, 2 Sp)	12 March 1998	(Austria) Hochfilzen	15 km individual	Biathlon World Cup
1997–98; 3 victories (1 In, 2 Sp)	14 March 1998	(Austria) Hochfilzen	7.5 km sprint	Biathlon World Cup
1998–99; 4 victories (2 In, 1 Pu, 1 MS)	13 December 1998	(Austria) Hochfilzen	15 km individual	Biathlon World Cup
1998–99; 4 victories (2 In, 1 Pu, 1 MS)	16 December 1998	(Slovakia) Brezno-Osrblie	15 km individual	Biathlon World Cup
1998–99; 4 victories (2 In, 1 Pu, 1 MS)	20 December 1998	(Slovakia) Brezno-Osrblie	10 km pursuit	Biathlon World Cup
1998–99; 4 victories (2 In, 1 Pu, 1 MS)	13 January 1999	(Germany) Ruhpolding	12.5 km mass start	Biathlon World Cup
1999–00; 1 victory (1 In)	16 December 1999	(Slovakia) Brezno-Osrblie	15 km individual	Biathlon World Cup
2000–01; 1 victory (1 Sp)	2 March 2001	(United States) Salt Lake City	7.5 km sprint	Biathlon World Cup
2002–03; 1 victory (1 MS)	8 January 2003	(Germany) Oberhof	12.5 km mass start	Biathlon World Cup
2003–04; 3 victories (1 Sp, 2 Pu)	9 January 2004	(Slovenia) Pokljuka	10 km pursuit	Biathlon World Cup
2003–04; 3 victories (1 Sp, 2 Pu)	3 March 2004	(United States) Fort Kent	7.5 km sprint	Biathlon World Cup
2003–04; 3 victories (1 Sp, 2 Pu)	5 March 2004	(United States) Fort Kent	10 km pursuit	Biathlon World Cup
2004–05; 5 victories (2 Sp, 3 Pu)	2 December 2004	(Norway) Beitostølen	7.5 km sprint	Biathlon World Cup
2004–05; 5 victories (2 Sp, 3 Pu)	4 December 2004	(Norway) Beitostølen	10 km pursuit	Biathlon World Cup
2004–05; 5 victories (2 Sp, 3 Pu)	9 January 2005	(Germany) Oberhof	10 km pursuit	Biathlon World Cup
2004–05; 5 victories (2 Sp, 3 Pu)	5 March 2005	(Austria) Hochfilzen	7.5 km sprint	Biathlon World Championships
2004–05; 5 victories (2 Sp, 3 Pu)	6 March 2005	(Austria) Hochfilzen	10 km pursuit	Biathlon World Championships
2005–06; 1 victory (1 Sp)	26 November 2005	(Sweden) Östersund	7.5 km sprint	Biathlon World Cup

*Results are from IBU races which include the Biathlon World Cup, Biathlon World Championships and the Winter Olympic Games.

== Cross-country skiing results ==
All results are sourced from the International Ski Federation (FIS).

=== World Cup ===
==== Season standings ====
Season	Age			
Season	Age	Overall	Distance	Sprint
2004	34	59	—	34

==== Team podiums ====
- 1 podium – (1 TS)

No.	Season	Date	Location	Race	Level	Place	Teammate
1	2003–04	26 October 2003	Düsseldorf, Germany	6 × 0.8 km Team Sprint F	World Cup	2nd	Künzel

== See also ==
- List of multiple Winter Olympic medalists

Awards
Preceded by (Germany) Birgit Fischer	German Sportswoman of the Year; 2005	Succeeded by (Germany) Kati Wilhelm
