= Ana Roman =

Romanian biathlete (born 1975)

Personal information
- Nationality: Romanian
- Born: 13 November 1975 (age 49); Zărneşti, Braşov, Romania
- Height: 165 cm (5 ft 5 in)
- Weight: 59 kg (130 lb)

Sport
- Sport: Biathlon

Ana Roman (born 13 November 1975) is a Romanian biathlete. She competed in the women's relay event at the 1994 Winter Olympics.
