= Merle Viirmaa =

Estonian biathlete (born 1974)

Personal information
- Nationality: Estonian
- Born: 15 June 1974 (age 52) Tallinn, then part of Estonian SSR, Soviet Union

Sport
- Sport: Biathlon

Merle Viirmaa (born 15 June 1974) is a retired Estonian biathlete. She competed in the women's relay event at the 1994 Winter Olympics.
