= Heléne Dahlberg =

Swedish biathlete (born 1971)

Personal information
- Nationality: Swedish
- Born: 26 August 1971 (age 53)

Sport
- Sport: Biathlon

Heléne Dahlberg (born 26 August 1971) is a Swedish biathlete. She competed in the women's relay event at the 1994 Winter Olympics.
