= Vadim Sashurin =

Belarusian biathlete (born 1970)

Personal information
- Full name: Vadim Leonidovich Sashurin
- Born: 19 February 1970 (age 56) Petrozavodsk, Karelian ASSR, RSFSR, Soviet Union
- Height: 1.82 m (6 ft 0 in)

Sport

Professional information
- Sport: Biathlon
- World Cup debut: 19 January 1989

Olympic Games
- Teams: 3 (1994, 1998, 2002)
- Medals: 0

World Championships
- Teams: 9 (1993, 1994, 1995, 1996, 1997, 1998, 1999, 2000, 2001)
- Medals: 9 (3 gold)

World Cup
- Seasons: 13 (1988/89, 1992/93–2001/02, 2004/05–2005/06)
- Individual victories: 2
- All victories: 6
- Individual podiums: 12
- All podiums: 29
Medal record
Men's biathlon
Representing Belarus
World Championships
Gold medal – first place	1996 Ruhpolding	Team event
Gold medal – first place	1997 Brezno-Osrblie	Team event
Gold medal – first place	1999 Kontiolahti	4 × 7.5 km relay
Silver medal – second place	2001 Pokljuka	20 km individual
Silver medal – second place	2001 Pokljuka	4 × 7.5 km relay
Bronze medal – third place	1995 Antholz-Anterselva	4 × 7.5 km relay
Bronze medal – third place	1996 Ruhpolding	20 km individual
Bronze medal – third place	1996 Ruhpolding	4 × 7.5 km relay
Bronze medal – third place	1999 Oslo	20 km individual

Vadim Leonidovich Sashurin (Belarusian: Вадзім Леанідавіч Сашурын; born 19 February 1970) is a former Soviet and Belarusian biathlete and current coach. In the lead-up to the 2002–03 season, Sashurin was caught using the banned steroid nandrolone. He was initially banned for 15 months, but the ban was extended to 24 months after Sashurin failed to take part in an anti-doping campaign, as mandated by the IBU.

== Biathlon results ==
All results are sourced from the International Biathlon Union.

=== Olympic Games ===
Event	Individual	Sprint	Pursuit	Relay
(Norway) 1994 Lillehammer	28th	—	—N/a	—
(Japan) 1998 Nagano	13th	46th	—N/a	4th
(United States) 2002 Salt Lake City	9th	12th	10th	8th

*Pursuit was added as an event in 2002.

=== World Championships ===
9 medals (3 gold, 2 silver, 4 bronze)

Event	Individual	Sprint	Pursuit	Mass start	Team	Relay
(Bulgaria) 1993 Borovets	61st	—	—N/a	—N/a	—	4th
(Canada) 1994 Canmore	—N/a	—N/a	—N/a	—N/a	9th	—N/a
(Italy) 1995 Antholz-Anterselva	44th	14th	—N/a	—N/a	8th	Bronze
(Germany) 1996 Ruhpolding	Bronze	42nd	—N/a	—N/a	Gold	Bronze
(Slovakia) 1997 Brezno-Osrblie	26th	27th	11th	—N/a	Gold	4th
(Slovenia) 1998 Pokljuka	—N/a	—N/a	12th	—N/a	12th	—N/a
(Finland) 1999 Kontiolahti	Bronze	20th	26th	14th	—N/a	Gold
(Norway) 2000 Oslo Holmenkollen	12th	14th	14th	11th	—N/a	4th
(Slovenia) 2001 Pokljuka	Silver	16th	12th	5th	—N/a	Silver

*During Olympic seasons competitions are only held for those events not included in the Olympic program.
**Team was removed as an event in 1998, and pursuit was added in 1997 with mass start being added in 1999.

=== Individual victories ===
2 victories (2 Sp)

Season	Date	Location	Discipline	Level
1996–97; 1 victory (1 Sp)	7 December 1996	(Sweden) Östersund	10 km sprint	Biathlon World Cup
1999–2000; 1 victory (1 Sp)	17 March 2000	(Russia) Khanty-Mansiysk	10 km sprint	Biathlon World Cup

*Results are from UIPMB and IBU races which include the Biathlon World Cup, Biathlon World Championships and the Winter Olympic Games.
