= Bedřiška Kulhavá =

Czech middle-distance runner (1931–2024)

Personal information
- Nationality: Czech
- Born: Bedřiška Müllerová; 4 December 1931 Ústí nad Labem, Czechoslovakia
- Died: 20 February 2024 (aged 92)

Sport
- Sport: Middle-distance running
- Event: 800 metres

Bedřiška Kulhavá (née Müllerová; 4 December 1931 – 20 February 2024) was a Czech middle-distance runner. She competed for Czechoslovakia in the women's 800 metres at the 1960 Summer Olympics. Her daughter Jana Kulhava-Vápeníková competed in biathlon at the 1992 Winter Olympics. Kulhavá died on 20 February 2024, at the age of 92.
