= Emmanuelle Claret =

French biathlete (1968–2013)

Personal information
- Nationality: French
- Born: 30 October 1968 Gap, Hautes-Alpes, France
- Died: 11 May 2013 (aged 44) Besançon, Doubs, France
- Height: 1.65 m (5 ft 5 in)
- Weight: 58 kg (128 lb)

Sport

Professional information
- Sport: Biathlon
- Club: Ski club Les Douanes Gap
- World Cup debut: 1993

Olympic Games
- Teams: 2 – (1994, 1998)
- Medals: 0 (0 gold)

World Championships
- Teams: 6 (1995–2000)
- Medals: 2 (1 gold)

World Cup
- Seasons: 7 (1993/94–1999/00)
- Individual victories: 3
- All victories: 6
- Individual podiums: 8
- All podiums: 13
- Overall titles: 1 (1995−96)
Medal record
World Championships
Gold medal – first place	1996 Ruhpolding	15 km individual
Silver medal – second place	1996 Ruhpolding	4 × 7.5 km relay

Emmanuelle Claret (30 October 1968 – 11 May 2013) was a French biathlete. Her best performance came in 1996 when she became world champion in the Biathlon World Championships 1996 in Ruhpolding at 15 km. She also won a silver medal with the French relay at the same championships. She won the overall World Cup in 1996. She has won three individual victories in the world cup. She died of leukemia on 11 May 2013, aged 44.
