= Thierry Dusserre =

French biathlete (born 1967)

Medal record

Men's biathlon

Representing France

Olympic Games
Bronze medal – third place	1994 Lillehammer	4 × 7.5 km relay

World Championships
Silver medal – second place	1995 Antholz-Anterselva	4 × 7.5 km relay
Bronze medal – third place	1993 Borovets	Team event
Bronze medal – third place	1995 Antholz-Anterselva	Team event

Thierry Dusserre (born 25 July 1967 in Romans-sur-Isère, Drôme) is a French biathlete.

He was born in Romans-sur-Isère, Drôme. At the 1994 Winter Olympics in Lillehammer, he won a bronze medal with the French relay team, in 4 x 7.5 km relay.
