= Jens Steinigen =

German biathlete (born 1966)

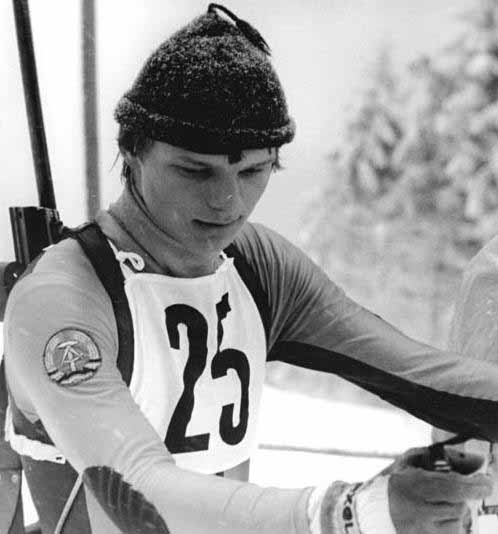
- Steinigen in Oberhof in 1984.

Personal information
- Full name: Jens Steinigen
- Born: 2 September 1966 (age 60) Dippoldiswalde, East Germany
- Height: 1.87 m (6 ft 2 in)

Sport

Professional information
- Sport: Biathlon
- Club: SC Ruhpolding
- World Cup debut: 23 January 1986

Olympic Games
- Teams: 2 (1992, 1994)
- Medals: 1 (1 gold)

World Championships
- Teams: 3 (1992, 1993, 1994)
- Medals: 2 (0 gold)

World Cup
- Seasons: 8 (1985/86–1986/87, 1990/91–1995/96)
- Individual victories: 2
- Individual podiums: 4
Medal record
Men's biathlon
Representing Germany
Olympic Games
Gold medal – first place	1992 Albertville	4 × 7.5 km relay
World Championships
Bronze medal – third place	1993 Borovets	4 × 7.5 km relay
Bronze medal – third place	1994 Canmore	Team event

Jens Steinigen (born 2 September 1966) is a German (former East German) former biathlete.

He started his career in 1984, and became junior world champion. Due to the sporting problems in the DDR he failed to qualify for the 1988 Winter Olympics in Calgary. He won with the German relay team together with Ricco Groß, Mark Kirchner and Fritz Fischer at the 1992 Olympics in Albertville the gold medal. The following year he did again win a medal with the German relay team this time a bronze medal at the World Championships.

After his career as biathlete Steinigen became a courtlawyer.

== Biathlon results ==
All results are sourced from the International Biathlon Union.

=== Olympic Games ===
1 medal (1 gold)

Event	Individual	Sprint	Relay
(France) 1992 Albertville	29th	6th	Gold
(Norway) 1994 Lillehammer	5th	—	—

=== World Championships ===
2 medals (2 bronze)

Event	Individual	Sprint	Team	Relay
(Russia) 1992 Novosibirsk	—N/a	—N/a	7th	—N/a
(Bulgaria) 1993 Borovets	33rd	—	—	Bronze
(Canada) 1994 Canmore	—N/a	—N/a	Bronze	—N/a

*During Olympic seasons competitions are only held for those events not included in the Olympic program.

=== Individual victories ===
2 victories (1 In, 1 Sp)

Season	Date	Location	Discipline	Level
1991–92; 2 victories (1 In, 1 Sp)	19 December 1991	(Austria) Hochfilzen	20 km individual	Biathlon World Cup
1991–92; 2 victories (1 In, 1 Sp)	18 January 1992	(Germany) Ruhpolding	10 km sprint	Biathlon World Cup

*Results are from UIPMB and IBU races which include the Biathlon World Cup, Biathlon World Championships and the Winter Olympic Games.
