= Tomáš Kos =

Czech biathlete (born 1967)

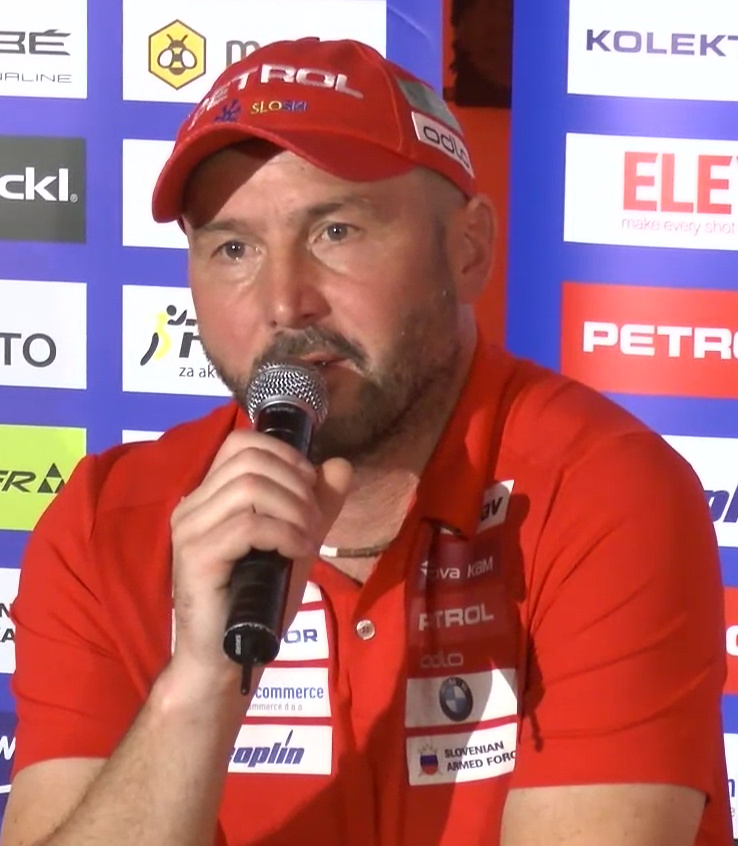
- Tomaš Kos in 2016

Personal information
- Nationality: Czech
- Born: 31 December 1967 (age 57); Semily, Czechoslovakia

Sport
- Sport: Biathlon

Tomáš Kos (born 31 December 1967) is a Czech biathlete. He competed at the 1988, the 1992 and the 1994 Winter Olympics.
