= Xavier Blond (biathlete) =

French biathlete (born 1965)

Personal information
- Nationality: French
- Born: 18 June 1965 (age 59); Grenoble, France

Sport
- Sport: Biathlon

Xavier Blond (born 18 June 1965) is a French biathlete. He competed at the 1988 Winter Olympics and the 1992 Winter Olympics.
