= Simone Greiner-Petter-Memm =

German cross-country skier and biathlete (born 1967)

Medal record

Women's biathlon

Representing Germany

Olympic Games
Silver medal – second place	1994 Lillehammer	4 × 7.5 km relay

World Championships
Gold medal – first place	1995; Antholz-Anterselva	4 × 7.5 km relay
Gold medal – first place	1996 Ruhpolding	Team event
Gold medal – first place	1996 Ruhpolding	4 × 7.5 km relay
Gold medal – first place	1997 Brezno-Osrblie	4 × 7.5 km relay
Gold medal – first place	1999 Kontiolahti	4 × 7.5 km relay
Silver medal – second place	1995; Antholz-Anterselva	Team event

Women's cross-country skiing

Representing East Germany

Junior World Championships
Silver medal – second place	1987 Asiago	3 × 5 km relay
Silver medal – second place	1987 Asiago	15 km freestyle

Simone Greiner-Petter-Memm (born 15 September 1967) is a German former cross-country skier and biathlete who competed from 1987 to 1997 in cross-country skiing and from 1992 to 2000 in biathlon.

She was born in Jena, as Simone Greiner-Petter, as a cross-country skier at the 1988 Winter Olympics in Calgary, Greiner-Petter-Memm finished fifth in the 4 × 5 km relay and 15th in the 20 km event. She also finished 15th in the 20 km event at the 1987 FIS Nordic World Ski Championships in Oberstdorf. Greiner-Petter-Memm's only individual World Cup victory was in a 20 km event in 1988.

== Cross-country skiing results ==
All results are sourced from the International Ski Federation (FIS).

=== Olympic Games ===
Year	Age	5 km	10 km	20 km	4 × 5 km relay
1988	20	—	21	15	5

=== World Championships ===
Year	Age	5 km	10 km	20 km	4 × 5 km relay
1987	19	—	—	15	4

=== World Cup ===
==== Season standings ====
Season	Age	Overall
1987	19	30
1988	20	8

==== Individual podiums ====
- 1 victory
- 2 podiums

No.	Season	Date	Location	Race	Level	Place
1	1987–88	13 December 1987	La Clusaz, France	5 km Individual F	World Cup	3rd
2	1987–88	15 January 1988	Toblach, Italy	20 km Individual F	World Cup	1st

== Biathlon results ==
Switching to biathlon in 1992, Greiner-Petter-Memm earned a total of four individual World Cup career victories and had her best overall World cup finish of sixth in the 1993–94 season. At the 1994 Winter Olympics in Lillehammer, she earned a silver medal in the 4 × 7.5 km relay despite blowing a noticeable lead during the standing phase of her leg. Greiner-Petter-Memm missed all five of her targets and missed with her three additional bullets, which results in five 150 m penalty loops afterwards.

She also earned gold medals at the Biathlon World Championships in the 4 × 7.5 km relay event (1995–1997, 1999).

== Personal life ==
Her husband is Silvio Memm, a former Nordic combined skier.
