= Lionel Laurent =

French biathlete (born 1964)

Medal record

Men's biathlon

Representing France

Olympic Games
Bronze medal – third place	1994 Lillehammer	4 × 7.5 km relay

World Championships
Silver medal – second place	1995 Antholz-Anterselva	4 × 7.5 km relay
Bronze medal – third place	1993 Borovets	Team event
Bronze medal – third place	1995 Antholz-Anterselva	Team event

Lionel Laurent (born 10 October 1964 in Moûtiers) is a French former biathlete.

He was born in Moûtiers. At the 1994 Winter Olympics in Lillehammer, he won a bronze medal with the French relay team, in 4 × 7.5 km relay.
