= Nathalie Santer-Bjørndalen =

Italian Belgian biathlete and skier (born 1972)

Nathalie Santer
Personal information
- Born: 28 March 1972 (age 54) Innichen, Italy

Sport
- Country: Belgium

Achievements and titles
- Highest world ranking: 2nd, Biathlon World Cup (1993/94)

Nathalie Santer (born 28 March 1972) is a former biathlete and cross-country skier. She has dual Italian and Belgian citizenship.

From 2006 to 2012 she was married to fellow biathlete Ole Einar Bjørndalen.

== Further notable results ==
=== Biathlon ===
- 1990:
  - 1st, Italian championships of biathlon
  - 1st, Italian championships of biathlon, sprint
- 1991:
  - 2nd, Italian championships of biathlon
  - 2nd, Italian championships of biathlon, sprint
- 1992: 1st, Italian championships of biathlon, sprint
- 1993:
  - 1st, Italian championships of biathlon
  - 1st, Italian championships of biathlon, sprint
- 1994:
  - 1st, Italian championships of biathlon
  - 1st, Italian championships of biathlon, sprint
- 1995:
  - 1st, Italian championships of biathlon
  - 1st, Italian championships of biathlon, sprint
- 1996:
  - 1st, Italian championships of biathlon
  - 1st, Italian championships of biathlon, sprint
- 1997:
  - 1st, Italian championships of biathlon, sprint
  - 2nd, Italian championships of biathlon
- 1998:
  - 1st, Italian championships of biathlon
  - 2nd, Italian championships of biathlon, pursuit
- 1999: 1st, Italian championships of biathlon, sprint
- 2001:
  - 2nd, Italian championships of biathlon, sprint
  - 2nd, Italian championships of biathlon, pursuit
  - 3rd Italian championships of biathlon
  - 3rd, Italian championships of biathlon, mass start
- 2002:
  - 1st, Italian championships of biathlon
  - 2nd, Italian championships of biathlon, pursuit
  - 2nd, Italian championships of biathlon, mass start
- 2003:
  - 3rd, Italian championships of biathlon, sprint
  - 3rd, Italian championships of biathlon, pursuit
- 2004:
  - 2nd, Italian championships of biathlon, pursuit
  - 3rd, Italian championships of biathlon, sprint
- 2005:
  - 2nd, Italian championships of biathlon, pursuit
  - 3rd, Italian championships of biathlon, sprint
- 2006:
  - 1st, Italian championships of biathlon, sprint
  - 2nd, Italian championships of biathlon, pursuit

== Cross-country skiing results ==
All results are sourced from the International Ski Federation (FIS).

=== World Championships ===
Year	Age	10 km individual	15 km skiathlon	30 km mass start	Sprint	4 × 5 km relay	Team sprint
2007	34	53	—	—	—	—	—

=== World Cup ===
==== Season standings ====
Season	Age	Overall
1995	23	55
