= Patrice Bailly-Salins =

French biathlete (born 1964)

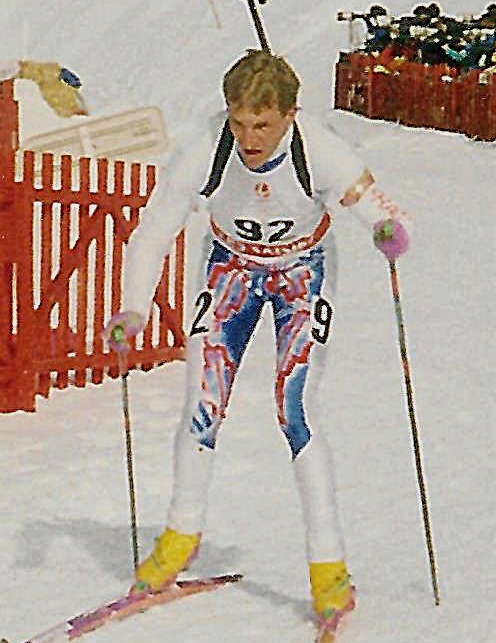
- Patrice Bailly-Salins in 1992.

Personal information
- Full name: Patrice Bailly-Salins
- Born: 21 June 1964 (age 62) Morez, France
- Height: 1.77 m (5 ft 10 in)

Sport

Professional information
- Sport: Biathlon
- Club: Ski Club Morbier
- World Cup debut: 15 December 1988

Olympic Games
- Teams: 3 (1992, 1994, 1998)
- Medals: 1 (0 gold)

World Championships
- Teams: 5 (1991, 1992, 1993, 1995, 1997)
- Medals: 2 (1 gold)

World Cup
- Seasons: 10 (1988/89–1997/98)
- Individual victories: 7
- Individual podiums: 12
- Overall titles: 1 (1993–94)
- Discipline titles: 1: 1 Individual (1993–94)
Medal record
Men's biathlon
Representing France
Olympic Games
Bronze medal – third place	1994 Lillehammer	4 × 7.5 km relay
World Championships
Gold medal – first place	1995 Antholz-Anterselva	10 km sprint
Silver medal – second place	1995 Antholz-Anterselva	4 × 7.5 km relay

Patrice Bailly-Salins (born 21 June 1964) is a former French biathlete. He won at the 1994 Olympics in Lillehammer a bronze medal with the French relay team. In 1995, he won the world title in the sprint event and came second in the 4 × 7.5 km relay with the French relay team. In 1994, he won the overall World Cup.

== Biathlon results ==
All results are sourced from the International Biathlon Union.

=== Olympic Games ===
1 medal (1 bronze)

Event	Individual	Sprint	Relay
(France) 1992 Albertville	22nd	30th	—
(Norway) 1994 Lillehammer	13th	11th	Bronze
(Japan) 1998 Nagano	—	—	7th

=== World Championships ===
2 medals (1 gold, 1 silver)

Event	Individual	Sprint	Pursuit	Team	Relay
(Finland) 1991 Lahti	21st	—	—N/a	6th	—
(Russia) 1992 Novosibirsk	—N/a	—N/a	—N/a	6th	—N/a
(Bulgaria) 1993 Borovets	8th	66th	—N/a	—	8th
(Italy) 1995 Antholz-Anterselva	7th	Gold	—N/a	—	Silver
(Slovakia) 1997 Brezno-Osrblie	22nd	15th	13th	—	5th

*During Olympic seasons competitions are only held for those events not included in the Olympic program.
**Pursuit was added as an event in 1997.

=== Individual victories ===
7 victories (4 In, 3 Sp)

Season	Date	Location	Discipline	Level
1991–92; 1 victory (1 Sp)	12 March 1992	(Norway) Skrautvål	10 km sprint	Biathlon World Cup
1992–93; 1 victory (1 In)	17 December 1992	(Slovenia) Pokljuka	20 km individual	Biathlon World Cup
1993–94; 3 victories (2 In, 1 Sp)	11 December 1993	(Austria) Bad Gastein	10 km sprint	Biathlon World Cup
1993–94; 3 victories (2 In, 1 Sp)	16 December 1993	(Slovenia) Pokljuka	20 km individual	Biathlon World Cup
1993–94; 3 victories (2 In, 1 Sp)	13 January 1994	(Germany) Ruhpolding	20 km individual	Biathlon World Cup
1994–95; 2 victories (1 In, 1 Sp)	26 January 1995	(Germany) Ruhpolding	20 km individual	Biathlon World Cup
1994–95; 2 victories (1 In, 1 Sp)	18 February 1995	(Italy) Antholz-Anterselva	10 km sprint	Biathlon World Championships

*Results are from UIPMB and IBU races which include the Biathlon World Cup, Biathlon World Championships and the Winter Olympic Games.
