= Valeri Kiriyenko =

Russian biathlete

Medal record

Men's biathlon

Representing Russia

Olympic Games
Silver medal – second place	1994 Lillehammer	4 × 7.5 km relay

World Championships
Silver medal – second place	1993 Borovets	Team event
Silver medal – second place	1993 Borovets	4 × 7.5 km relay
Silver medal – second place	1994 Canmore	Team event

Representing Unified Team

Olympic Games
Silver medal – second place	1992 Albertville	4 × 7.5 km relay

Valeri Viktorovich Kiriyenko (Russian: Валерий Викторович Кириенко) (born 13 February 1965 in Murmansk) is a Russian biathlete, who won two silver medals at the Winter Olympics, and three silver medals at the World Championships.

== Biathlon results ==
All results are sourced from the International Biathlon Union.

=== Olympic Games ===
2 medal (2 silver)

Event	Individual	Sprint	Relay
(France) 1992 Albertville	11th	5th	Silver
(Norway) 1994 Lillehammer	35th	16th	Silver

=== World Championships ===
3 medals (3 silver)

Event	Individual	Sprint	Team	Relay
(Bulgaria) 1993 Borovets	—	8th	Silver	Silver
(Canada) 1994 Canmore	—N/a	—N/a	Silver	—N/a

*During Olympic seasons competitions are only held for those events not included in the Olympic program.

=== Individual victories ===
1 victories (1 In)

Season	Date	Location	Discipline	Level
1991–92; 1 victory (1 In)	21 January 1992	(Italy) Antholz-Anterselva	20 km individual	Biathlon World Cup

*Results are from UIPMB and IBU races which include the Biathlon World Cup, Biathlon World Championships and the Winter Olympic Games.
