= Anne Briand =

French biathlete (born 1968)

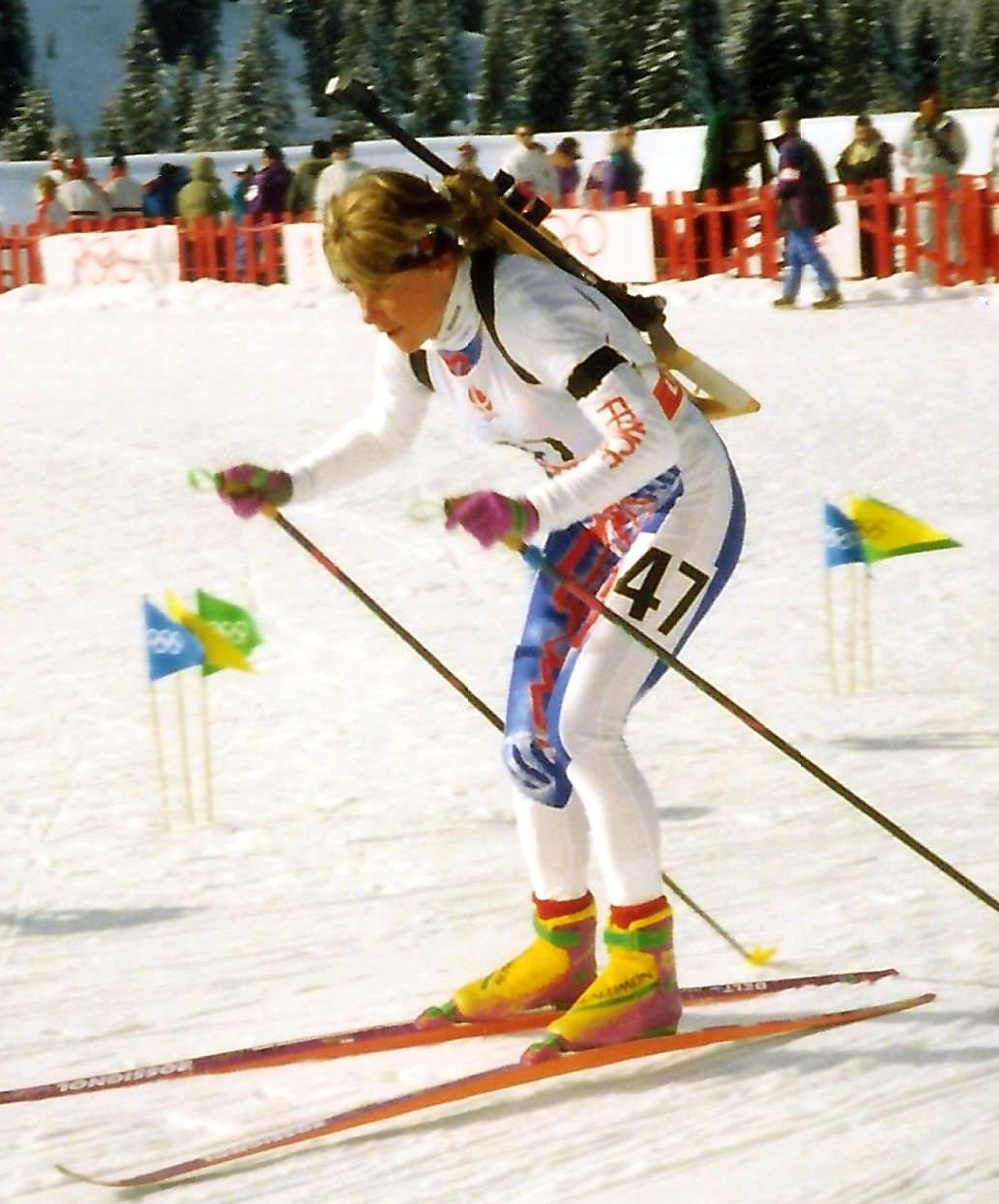
- Anne Briand during the individual of the 1992 Winter Olympics

Personal information
- Nationality: French
- Born: 2 June 1968 (age 58) Mulhouse, France
- Height: 1.70 m (5 ft 7 in)
- Weight: 55 kg (121 lb)

Sport

Professional information
- Sport: Biathlon
- Club: SC Douanes Montgenevre
- World Cup debut: 1990

Olympic Games
- Teams: 3 – (1992, 1994, 1998)
- Medals: 3 (1 gold)

World Championships
- Teams: 8 (1991–1999)
- Medals: 7 (2 gold)

World Cup
- Seasons: 9 (1990/91–1998/99)
- Individual victories: 6
- All victories: 10
- Individual podiums: 16
- All podiums: 25
- Overall titles: 1 (1994−95)
Medal record
Olympic Games
Gold medal – first place	1992 Albertville	3 × 7.5 km relay
Silver medal – second place	1994 Lillehammer	15 km individual
Bronze medal – third place	1994 Lillehammer	4 × 7.5 km relay
World Championships
Gold medal – first place	1993 Borovets	Team event
Gold medal – first place	1995 Antholz-Anterselva	7.5 km sprint
Silver medal – second place	1993 Borovetz	4 × 7.5 km relay
Silver medal – second place	1995 Antholz-Anterselva	Team event
Silver medal – second place	1995 Antholz-Anterselva	4 × 7.5 km relay
Silver medal – second place	1996 Ruhpolding	Team event
Silver medal – second place	1996 Ruhpolding	4 × 7.5 km relay

Anne Briand (born 2 June 1968 in Mulhouse) is a former French biathlete. She belonged to the world's best biathletes in the early 1990s. At the 1992 Olympics in Albertville, the first time this competition was introduced at the olympic level she won a gold medal with the French relay team. At the 1994 Olympics in Lillehammer, Briand won the silver medal in the 15 kilometer event.In 1995 she won the world title in the sprint event and also won the overall World Cup.
