= Ntala Skinner =

American biathlete (born 1973)

Ntala Quintilio (née Skinner; born 22 February 1973) is a retired American biathlete from Sun Valley, Idaho. She competed for the United States at the 1998 Winter Olympics. In 1993 she was the only junior team member to make the U.S. squad for the 1993 Worlds.

She later married Canadian Olympian Kevin Quintilio and emigrated to Canada.
