= Hubert Leitgeb (biathlete) =

Italian biathlete

Personal information
- Full name: Hubert Leitgeb
- Born: 31 October 1965 Antholz-Anterselva, Italy
- Died: 4 February 2012 (aged 46) Staller Saddle, Italy
- Height: 1.84 m (6 ft 0 in)

Sport

Professional information
- Sport: Biathlon
- Club: C.S. Carabinieri
- World Cup debut: 16 January 1986

Olympic Games
- Teams: 2 (1992, 1998)
- Medals: 0 (0 gold)

World Championships
- Teams: 9 (1989, 1990, 1991, 1992, 1994, 1995, 1996, 1997, 1998)
- Medals: 3 (2 gold)

World Cup
- Seasons: 12 (1985/86–1986/87, 1988/89–1997/98)
- Individual victories: 1
- Individual podiums: 3
Medal record
Men's biathlon
Representing Italy
World Championships
Gold medal – first place	1991 Lahti	Team event
Gold medal – first place	1994 Canmore	Team event
Bronze medal – third place	1996 Ruhpolding	Team event

Hubert Leitgeb (31 October 1965 – 4 February 2012) was an Italian biathlete.

== Life and career ==
Leitgeb participated in two Olympics, in 1992 and 1998. Alongside Johann Passler, Pieralberto Carrara and Andreas Zingerle, he was part of the Italian squad which narrowly missed out on a medal in the men's relay at the 1992 Games, finishing fourth. He won three medals at World Championships, including two golds. He competed in Biathlon World Cup, where he got 131 starts, with 17 finishes in the top 10. In 1994, he won his first and only individual World Cup victory, in a 20 km individual. Leitgeb retired as a biathlete after the 1997–98 season. After his retirement, he worked as a coach for five years. In 2006 he was elected to the International Biathlon Union's Technical Committee. The following year he became race director of the Biathlon World Cup races in Antholz.

== Avalanche accident ==
On 4 February 2012, Leitgeb died in an avalanche accident below the Staller Saddle in the Antholz valley, alongside his brother-in-law. Leitgeb was survived by his wife and two children.

== Biathlon results ==
All results are sourced from the International Biathlon Union.

=== Olympic Games ===
Event	Individual	Sprint	Relay
(France) 1992 Albertville	—	26th	4th
(Japan) 1998 Nagano	—	35th	—

=== World Championships ===
3 medals (2 gold, 1 bronze)

Event	Individual	Sprint	Pursuit	Team	Relay
(Austria) 1989 Feistritz	14th	—	—N/a	4th	—
(Soviet Union) 1990 Minsk	34th	—	—N/a	9th	—
(Finland) 1991 Lahti	27th	—	—N/a	Gold	4th
(Russia) 1992 Novosibirsk	—N/a	—N/a	—N/a	8th	—N/a
(Canada) 1994 Canmore	—N/a	—N/a	—N/a	Gold	—N/a
(Italy) 1995 Antholz-Anterselva	—	—	—N/a	—	4th
(Germany) 1996 Ruhpolding	4th	—	—N/a	Bronze	—
(Slovakia) 1997 Brezno-Osrblie	—	—	—	10th	—
(Slovenia) 1998 Pokljuka	—N/a	—N/a	—	6th	—N/a

*During Olympic seasons competitions are only held for those events not included in the Olympic program.
**Pursuit was added as an event in 1997.

=== Individual victories ===
1 victory (1 In)

Season	Date	Location	Discipline	Level
1993–94; 1 victory (1 In)	17 March 1994	(Canada) Canmore	20 km individual	Biathlon World Cup

*Results are from UIPMB and IBU races which include the Biathlon World Cup, Biathlon World Championships and the Winter Olympic Games.

Further notable results

- 1991: 3rd, Italian championships of biathlon
- 1992: 2nd, Italian championships of biathlon
- 1993: 2nd, Italian championships of biathlon
- 1994: 1st, Italian championships of biathlon
- 1996: 3rd, Italian championships of biathlon
- 1997:
  - 1st, Italian championships of biathlon, sprint
  - 2nd, Italian championships of biathlon
- 1998:
  - 1st, Italian championships of biathlon, sprint
  - 2nd, Italian championships of biathlon, pursuit
  - 3rd, Italian championships of biathlon
