= Svetlana Paramygina =

Belarusian biathlete (born 1965)

Medal record

Women's biathlon

Representing Belarus

Olympic Games
Silver medal – second place	1994 Lillehammer	7.5 km sprint

World Championships
Gold medal – first place	1994 Canmore	Team event
Silver medal – second place	1993 Borovets	Team event
Bronze medal – third place	1993 Borovets	15 km individual

Representing Soviet Union

World Championships
Gold medal – first place	1990 Oslo	Team event
Gold medal – first place	1991 Lahti	Team event

Svetlana Paramygina (sometimes Paramyguina) (Belarusian: Святлана Парамыгіна) (born 5 April 1965 in Sverdlovsk, Russian SFSR) is a former Belarusian biathlete. Her international biathlon career began in 1983. In the 1993/1994 season she won the overall World Cup. The following year she finished second overall. At the 1994 Winter Olympics in Lillehammer she won a silver medal in the sprint event. After the 2000/2001 season she retired as a biathlete.
