= Jana Vápeníková =

Czech biathlete (born 1964)

Jana Kulhavá-Vápeníková (born 10 July 1964 in Jablonec) is a former Czech biathlete. She won the gold medal on the relay at the Biathlon World Championships 1993 in Borovetz together with Eva Háková, Iveta Roubíčková and Jiřina Pelčová. At the Winter Olympics her best individual placing was 43rd at the 1992 Winter Olympics in Albertville. Her mother Bedřiška Kulhavá competed in the 1960 Summer Games.
