= Hervé Flandin =

French biathlete (born 1965)

Medal record

Men's biathlon

Representing France

Olympic Games
Bronze medal – third place	1994 Lillehammer	4 × 7.5 km relay

World Championships
Silver medal – second place	1990 Kontiolahti	4 × 7.5 km relay
Silver medal – second place	1995 Antholz-Anterselva	4 × 7.5 km relay
Bronze medal – third place	1990 Oslo	Team event

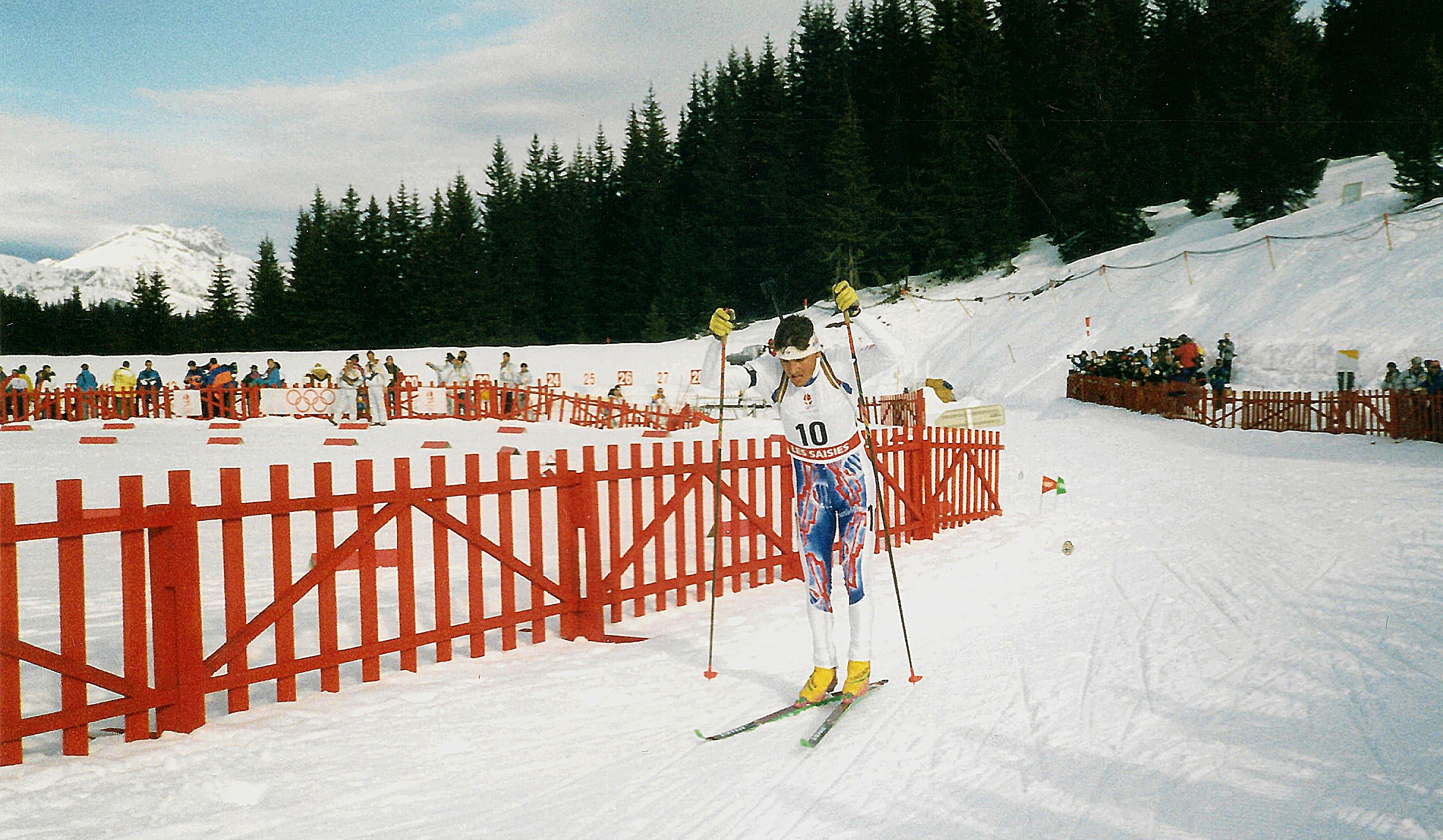

Hervé Flandin (born 4 June 1965 in Modane) is a former French biathlete. At the 1994 Winter Olympics in Lillehammer, he won a bronze medal with the French relay team, in 4 × 7.5 km relay.
