= Natalia Permiakova =

Belarusian biathlete (born 1970)

Personal information
- Nationality: Belarusian
- Born: 22 May 1970 (age 54)

Sport
- Sport: Biathlon

Natalia Permiakova (born 22 May 1970) is a Belarusian biathlete. She competed at the 1994 Winter Olympics and the 1998 Winter Olympics.
