= Corinne Niogret =

French biathlete

Medal record

Women's biathlon

Representing France

Olympic Games
Gold medal – first place	1992 Albertville	3 × 7.5 km relay
Bronze medal – third place	1994 Lillehammer	4 × 7.5 km relay

World Championships
Gold medal – first place	1993 Borovets	Team event
Gold medal – first place	1995 Antholz-Anterselva	15 km individual
Gold medal – first place	2000 Holmenkollen	15 km individual
Silver medal – second place	1993 Borovets	4 × 7.5 km relay
Silver medal – second place	1995 Antholz-Anterselva	4 × 7.5 km relay
Silver medal – second place	1996 Ruhpolding	4 × 7.5 km relay
Silver medal – second place	1998 Pokljuka	10 km pursuit
Silver medal – second place	1999 Holmenkollen	15 km individual
Silver medal – second place	2001 Pokljuka	10 km pursuit
Bronze medal – third place	1994 Canmore	Team event
Bronze medal – third place	1995 Antholz-Anterselva	7.5 km sprint
Bronze medal – third place	1995 Antholz-Anterselva	Team event
Bronze medal – third place	1996 Ruhpolding	Team event
Bronze medal – third place	1999 Kontiolahti	4 × 7.5 km relay
Bronze medal – third place	2000 Holmenkollen	12.5 km mass start

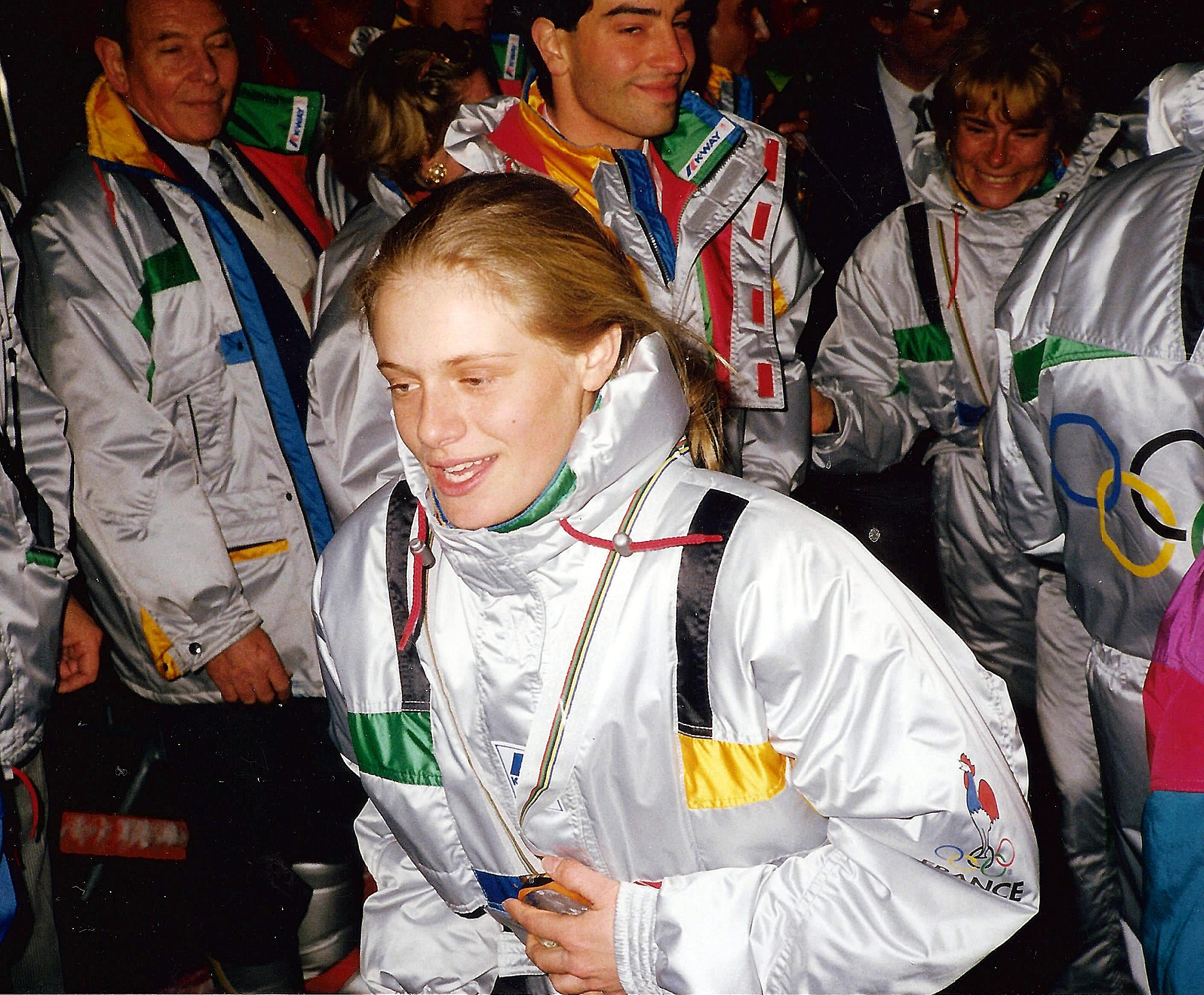

Corinne Niogret (born 20 November 1972, in Nantua, Ain) is a former French biathlete. She won 2 Olympic medals and 15 medals in the Biathlon World Championships. In 1999/2000 she finished 3rd in the overall World Cup, and she has a total of 8 victories in World Cup races.
