= Delphyne Heymann =

French biathlete (born 1966)

Medal record

Women's biathlon

Representing France

Olympic Games
Bronze medal – third place	1994 Lillehammer	4 × 7.5 km relay

World Championships
Gold medal – first place	1993 Borovets	Team event
Silver medal – second place	1993 Borovets	4 × 7.5 km relay
Bronze medal – third place	1999 Kontiolahti	4 × 7.5 km relay

Delphyne Heymann (born 24 November 1966) is a French biathlete. She finished 6th in the 15 km at the 1992 Winter Olympics in Albertville. She became World Champion with the French team in 1993. At the 1994 Winter Olympics in Lillehammer, she won a bronze medal with the French relay team.
