= Stéphane Bouthiaux =

French biathlete (born 1966)

Personal information
- Nationality: French
- Born: 26 March 1966 (age 59); Pontarlier, France

Sport
- Sport: Biathlon

Stéphane Bouthiaux (born 26 March 1966) is a French biathlete. He competed in the men's sprint event at the 1994 Winter Olympics.
