= Christian Dumont =

French biathlete (1963–2021)

Personal information
- Nationality: French
- Born: 19 March 1963 Doubs, France
- Died: 6 August 2021 (aged 58)

Sport
- Sport: Biathlon

Christian Dumont (19 March 1963 – 6 August 2021) was a French biathlete. He competed at the 1988 Winter Olympics and the 1992 Winter Olympics. He died of a heart attack during a bicycle ride, aged 58.
