= Véronique Claudel =

French biathlete (born 1966)

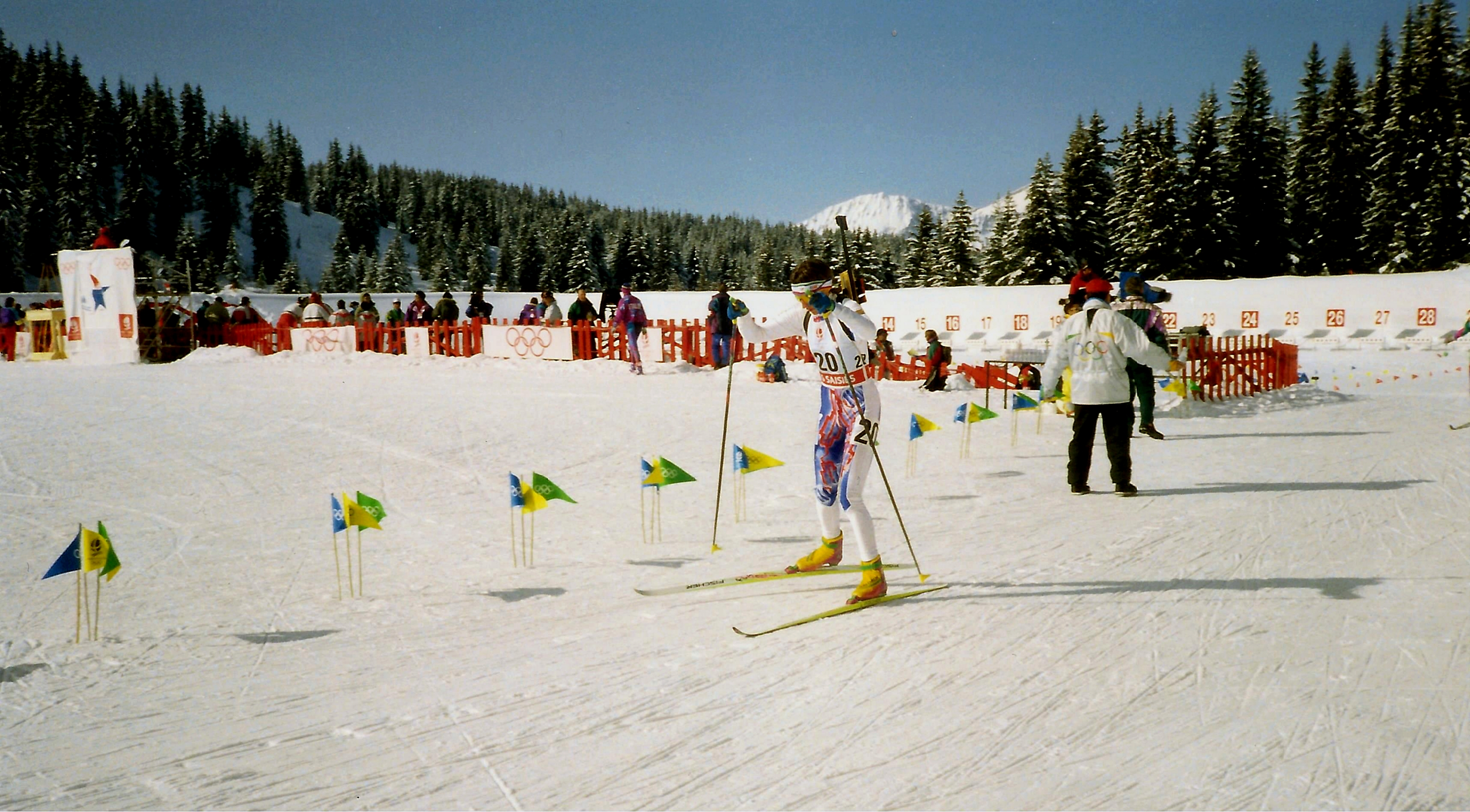
- Claudel at the 1992 Winter Olympics

Personal information
- Nationality: French
- Born: 22 November 1966 (age 59) Cornimont, France

Sport
- Sport: Biathlon
Medal record
Women's biathlon
Representing France
Olympic Games
Gold medal – first place	1992 Albertville	3 × 7.5 km relay
Bronze medal – third place	1994 Lillehammer	4 × 7.5 km relay

Véronique Claudel (born 22 November 1966 in Cornimont, France) is a former French biathlete. At the 1992 Winter Olympics in Albertville, she won a gold medal with the French relay team. She won an Olympic bronze medal in 1994.
