= Norwegian Biathlon Championships =

- Status: active
- Genre: sports competition
- Date: January–March
- Frequency: annual
- Location: Norway
- Inaugurated: 1959
- Organiser: NBA

The Norwegian Biathlon Championships is the national biathlon championships of Norway and have been held every year since 1959.

== Men ==
=== Individual (20 km) ===
This event was first held in 1959. It was not held in 2016.

Year	Location	Gold	Silver	Bronze
1959	Bærum	Henry Hermansen	Oddbjørn Skolegården	Knut Wold
1960	Oslo	Reidar Hjermstad	Jon Istad	Arvid Nyberg
1961	Hønefoss	Magnar Ingebrigtsli	Per Westgård	Olav Jordet
1962	Elverum	Olav Jordet	Jon Istad	Henry Hermansen
1963	Voss	Jon Istad	Olav Jordet	Magnar Ingebrigtsli
1964	Oslo	Olav Jordet	Ola Wærhaug	Ragnar Tveiten
1965	Oslo	Ragnar Tveiten	Ola Wærhaug	Olav Jordet
1966	Elverum	Jon Istad	Ola Wærhaug	Ivar Nordkild
1967	Lier	Jon Istad	Ivar Nordkild	Torgeir Tallerås
1968	Kongsvinger	Jon Istad	Ola Wærhaug	Ivar Nordkild
1969	Voss	Jon Istad	Tor Svendsberget	Esten Gjelten
1970	Trondheim	Kjell Hovda	Ivar Nordkild	Esten Gjelten
1971	Vingelen	Kjell Hovda	Ragnar Tveiten	Ola Wærhaug
1972	Evjemoen	Magnar Solberg	Terje Hanssen	Bjørn Sirijord
1973	Steinkjer	Ragnar Tveiten	Tor Svendsberget	Kjell Hovda
1974	Vingrom	Ole Per Strædet	Herulf Berntsen	Ivar Nordkild
1975	Mo i Rana	Kjell Hovda	Bjørn Sirijord	Ole Per Strædet
1976	Melhus	Sigleif Johansen	Terje Hanssen	Esten Gjelten
1977	Furnes	Svein Engen	Tor Svendsberget	Kjell Hovda
1978	Molde	Svein Engen	Rune Røli	Sigleif Johansen
1979	Øvrebø	Roar Nilsen	Terje Krokstad	Kjell Søbak
1980	Austmarka	Kjell Søbak	Roar Nilsen	Sigleif Johansen
1981	Bardufoss	Rolf Storsveen	Terje Krokstad	Sigleif Johansen
1982	Steinkjer	Eirik Kvalfoss	Odd Lirhus	Terje Krokstad
1983	Lygna	Svein Engen	Kjell Søbak	Øivind Nerhagen
1984	Vossestrand	Eirik Kvalfoss	Rolf Storsveen	Gisle Fenne
1985	Fyresdal	Eirik Kvalfoss	Øivind Nerhagen	Terje Krokstad
1986	Geilo	Eirik Kvalfoss	Geir Einang	Kjell Søbak
1987	Tromsø	Gisle Fenne	Øivind Nerhagen	Eirik Kvalfoss
1988	Dombås	Eirik Kvalfoss	Frode Løberg	Sylfest Glimsdal
1989	Sørskogsbygda	Frode Løberg	Eirik Kvalfoss	Geir Einang
1990	Voss	Frode Løberg	Eirik Kvalfoss	Gisle Fenne
1991	Steinkjer	Gisle Fenne	Sverre Istad	Frode Løberg
1992	Skrautvål	Jon Åge Tyldum	Eirik Kvalfoss	Geir Einang
1993	Hattfjelldal	Eirik Kvalfoss	Frode Løberg	Gisle Fenne
1994	Orkdal	Halvard Hanevold	Ole Einar Bjørndalen; Gisle Fenne	
1995	Fet	Ole Einar Bjørndalen	Halvard Hanevold	Alfred Tytingvåg
1996	Brumunddal	Halvard Hanevold	Dag Bjørndalen	Ole Einar Bjørndalen
1997	Snåsa	Jon Åge Tyldum	Jon Per Nygaard	Halvard Hanevold
1998	Dokka; Dombås	Sylfest Glimsdal	Halvard Hanevold	Jon Åge Tyldum
1999	Tana	Dag Bjørndalen	Jon Per Nygaard	Halvard Hanevold
2000	Meråker; Ål	Ole Einar Bjørndalen	Stian Eckhoff	Anstein Mykland
2001	Ål	Halvard Hanevold	Ole Einar Bjørndalen	Dag Bjørndalen
2002	Nordfjordeid	Egil Gjelland	Anstein Mykland	Halvard Hanevold
2003	Tromsø	Lars Berger	Tor Halvor Bjørnstad	Egil Gjelland
2004	Steinkjer	Ole Einar Bjørndalen	Stian Eckhoff	Egil Gjelland
2005	Bossmo; Ytteren; Skonseng	Hans Martin Gjedrem	Håkon Andersen	Halvard Hanevold
2006	Trondheim; Byåsen	Ole Einar Bjørndalen	Stian Eckhoff	Halvard Hanevold
2007	Folldal	Emil Hegle Svendsen	Magne Torleif Rønning	Ole Einar Bjørndalen
2008	Stryn	Frode Andresen	Halvard Hanevold	Alexander Os
2009	Lillehammer	Tarjei Bø	Emil Hegle Svendsen	Dag Erik Kokkin
2010	Simostranda	Hans Martin Gjedrem	Christian Georg Bache	Alexander Os
2011	Målselv	Tarjei Bø	Emil Hegle Svendsen	Ole Einar Bjørndalen
2012	Trondheim	Tarjei Bø	Dag Erik Kokkin	Rune Brattsveen
2013	Dombås	Vegard Bjørn Gjermundshaug	Lars Helge Birkeland	Dag Erik Kokkin
2014	Voss	Johannes Thingnes Bø	Vegard Bjørn Gjermundshaug	Henrik L'Abée-Lund
2015	Sirdal	Eirik Bratli	Kristoffer Langøien Skjelvik	Henrik L'Abée-Lund

=== Sprint (10 km) ===
This event was first held in 1974.

Year	Location	Gold	Silver	Bronze
1974	Vingrom	Ivar Nordkild	Kjell Hovda	Esten Gjelten
1975	Mo i Rana	Bjørn Sirijord	Tor Svendsberget	Svein Engen
1976	Melhus	Sigleif Johansen	Svein Engen	Bjørn Sirijord
1977	Furnes	Svein Engen	Sigleif Johansen	Tor Svendsberget
1978	Voss	Sigleif Johansen	Terje Krokstad	Tor Northug
1979	Øvrebø	Kjell Søbak	Odd Lirhus	Svein Engen
1980	Austmarka	Odd Lirhus	Terje Krokstad	Roar Nilsen
1981	Bardufoss	Sigleif Johansen	Rolf Storsveen	Svein Engen
1982	Steinkjer	Terje Krokstad	Eirik Kvalfoss	Johnny Rognstad
1983	Lygna	Kjell Søbak	Johnny Rognstad	Øivind Nerhagen
1984	Vossestrand	Johnny Rognstad	Eirik Kvalfoss	Øivind Nerhagen
1985	Fyresdal	Eirik Kvalfoss	Kjell Søbak	Johnny Rognstad
1986	Geilo	Eirik Kvalfoss	Øivind Nerhagen	Geir Einang
1987	Tromsø	Eirik Kvalfoss	Gisle Fenne	Geir Einang
1988	Dombås	Geir Einang	Eirik Kvalfoss	Hans Jørgen Tveito
1989	Sørskogsbygda	Frode Løberg	Ivar Michal Ulekleiv	Geir Einang
1990	Voss	Sverre Istad	Eirik Kvalfoss	Gisle Fenne
1991	Steinkjer	Jon Åge Tyldum	Eirik Kvalfoss	Geir Einang
1992	Skrautvål	Jon Åge Tyldum	Gisle Fenne	Tor Espen Kristiansen
1993	Brumunddal	Ivar Michal Ulekleiv	Dag Bjørndalen	Jon Åge Tyldum
1994	Trondheim	Sylfest Glimsdal	Halvard Hanevold	Frode Andresen
1995	Fet	Jon Åge Tyldum	Sylfest Glimsdal	Jon Per Nygaard
1996	Brumunddal	Frode Andresen	Jon Åge Tyldum	Dag Bjørndalen
1997	Snåsa	Ole Einar Bjørndalen	Sylfest Glimsdal	Halvard Hanevold
1998	Dokka; Dombås	Halvard Hanevold	Dag Bjørndalen	Frode Andresen
1999	Tana	Dag Bjørndalen	Frode Andresen	Sylfest Glimsdal
2000	Meråker; Ål	Ole Einar Bjørndalen	Frode Andresen	Halvard Hanevold
2001	Ål	Ole Einar Bjørndalen	Frode Andresen	Dag Bjørndalen
2002	Nordfjordeid	Ole Einar Bjørndalen	Egil Gjelland	Frode Andresen
2003	Tromsø	Egil Gjelland	Tor Halvor Bjørnstad	Dag Bjørndalen
2004	Steinkjer	Lars Berger	Halvard Hanevold	Ole Einar Bjørndalen
2005	Bossmo; Ytteren; Skonseng	Frode Andresen	Stian Eckhoff	Halvard Hanevold
2006	Trondheim; Byåsen	Stian Eckhoff	Ole Einar Bjørndalen	Frode Andresen
2007	Folldal	Ole Einar Bjørndalen	Magne Thorleiv Rønning; Stian Eckhoff	—
2008	Stryn	Emil Hegle Svendsen	Alexander Os	Stian Eckhoff
2009	Lillehammer	Alexander Os	Ronny Hafsås	Ole Einar Bjørndalen
2010	Simostranda	Emil Hegle Svendsen	Henrik L'Abée-Lund	Alexander Os
2011	Målselv	Tarjei Bø	Alexander Os	Dag Erik Kokkin
2012	Trondheim	Emil Hegle Svendsen	Lars Berger	Stian Gilje
2013	Dombås	Lars Berger	Johannes Thingnes Bø	Emil Hegle Svendsen
2014	Voss	Johannes Thingnes Bø	Erlend Bjøntegaard	Kristoffer Langøien Skjelvik
2015	Sirdal	Bjarte Solvang	Fredrik Gjesbakk	Lars Gunnar Skjevdal
2016	Dombås	Thomas Fenne	Andreas Dahlø Wærnes	Johannes Dale

=== Pursuit (12.5 km) ===
This event was first held in 1997. It was not held in 2006, 2010 and 2012.

Year	Location	Gold	Silver	Bronze
1997	Savalen	Ole Einar Bjørndalen	Frode Andresen	Dag Bjørndalen
1998	Dokka; Dombås	Frode Andresen	Halvard Hanevold	Dag Bjørndalen
1999	Tana	Frode Andresen	Sylfest Glimsdal	Anstein Mykland
2000	Meråker; Ål	Ole Einar Bjørndalen	Halvard Hanevold	Frode Andresen
2001	Ål	Ole Einar Bjørndalen	Halvard Hanevold	Frode Andresen
2002	Nordfjordeid	Ole Einar Bjørndalen	Frode Andresen	Egil Gjelland
2003	Tromsø	Ole Einar Bjørndalen	Lars Berger	Stian Eckhoff
2004	Steinkjer	Lars Berger	Halvard Hanevold	Ole Einar Bjørndalen
2005	Bossmo; Ytteren; Skonseng	Halvard Hanevold	Stian Eckhoff	Tor Halvor Bjørnstad
2007	Folldal	Ole Einar Bjørndalen	Stian Eckhoff	Magne Thorleiv Rønning
2008	Stryn	Emil Hegle Svendsen	Stian Eckhoff	Halvard Hanevold
2009	Lillehammer	Alexander Os	Tarjei Bø	Ole Einar Bjørndalen
2011	Målselv	Tarjei Bø	Alexander Os	Emil Hegle Svendsen
2013	Dombås	Emil Hegle Svendsen	Johannes Thingnes Bø	Lars Berger
2016	Dombås	Lars Helge Birkeland	Aleksander Fjeld Andersen	Henrik L'Abée-Lund

=== Mass start (15 km) ===
This event was first held in 2000. It was not held in 2007, 2008, 2009, 2011 and 2013.

Year	Location	Gold	Silver	Bronze
2000	Meråker; Ål	Halvard Hanevold	Ole Einar Bjørndalen	Frode Andresen
2001	Ål	Ole Einar Bjørndalen	Frode Andresen	Dag Bjørndalen
2002	Nordfjordeid	Frode Andresen	Egil Gjelland	Halvard Hanevold
2003	Tromsø	Halvard Hanevold	Egil Gjelland	Frode Andresen
2004	Steinkjer	Ole Einar Bjørndalen	Alexander Os	Anstein Mykland
2005	Bossmo; Ytteren; Skonseng	Ole Einar Bjørndalen	Lars Berger	Egil Gjelland
2006	Trondheim; Byåsen	Ole Einar Bjørndalen	Magne Thorleiv Rønning	Stian Eckhoff
2010	Simostranda	Halvard Hanevold	Emil Hegle Svendsen	Alexander Os
2012	Trondheim	Rune Brattsveen	Lars Berger	Emil Hegle Svendsen
2014	Voss	Kristoffer Langøien Skjelvik	Vetle Sjåstad Christiansen	Erlend Bjøntegaard
2015	Sirdal	Henrik L'Abée-Lund	Tarjei Bø	Vegard Bjørn Gjermundshaug
2016	Dombås	Tarjei Bø	Alexander Os	Lars Helge Birkeland

=== Relay (4 × 7.5 km) ===
This event was first held in 1966.

Year	Location	Gold	Silver	Bronze
1966	Elverum	Hardanger og Voss; Gunnar Holst; Dag Midthun; Jon Istad	Numedal; Jan Lunde; Odd Lunde; Ragnar Tveite	Nord-Østerdal; Olav Nygård; Torgeir Tallerås; Olav Jordet
1967	Lier	Numedal; Kjell Hovda; Kåre Hovda; Odd Lunde; Ragnar Tveiten	Hardanger og Voss	Nord-Østerdal; Torgeir Tallerås; Esten Gjelten; Egil Nygård; Olav Jordet
1968	Kongsvinger	Nord-Østerdal; Esten Gjelten; Olav Jordet; Lars Tørresvold; Torgeir Talleraas	Numedal; Odd Lunde; Kåre Hovda; Kjell Hovda; Ragnar Tveiten	Gudbrandsdal
1969	Voss	Nord-Østerdal; Torgeir Tallerås; Egil Nygård; Ingemann Erlimo; Esten Gjelten	Numedal	Hardanger og Voss
1970	Trondheim	Numedal; Kåre Hovda; Odd Lunde; Ragnar Tveiten; Kjell Hovda	Nord-Østerdal; Torgeir Talleraas; Per Johan Husom; Lars Tørresvold; Esten Gjelten	Gudbrandsdal; Øystein Roland; Iver Odlo; Jonas Roland; Bernt Rønningen
1971	Vingelen	Numedal; Odd Lunde^{[α]} Kåre Hovda; Kjell Hovda; Ragnar Tveiten		
1972	Evjemoen	Ut-Trøndelag; Kåre Åmot; Terje Hanssen; Egil Asbøll; Magnar Solberg	Numedal; Odd Lunde; Kjell Hovda; Kåre Hovda; Ragnar Tveiten	Vefsn; Gudmund Lien; Vidar Fagerbakk; Jonny Gerhardsen; Bjørn Sirijord
1973	Steinkjer	Numedal; Anders Besseberg; Kåre Hovda; Kjell Hovda; Ragnar Tveiten		
1974	Vingrom	Numedal I Kjell Flesaker; Kåre Hovda; Kjell Hovda; Ragnar Tveiten	Nord-Østerdal; Per Johan Husom; Ivar Riise; Ingmann Erlimo; Esten Gjelten	Numedal II; Anders Besseberg; Hilberg Steinsvik; Odd Lunde; Sigleif Johansen
1975	Mo i Rana	Numedal; Sigleif Johansen; Kjell Flesaker; Ragnar Tveiten; Kjell Hovda	Ringerike; Odd Pedersen; Nils Sørensen; Ivar Olsen; Svein Engen	Ut-Trøndelag; Terje Kråkstad; Ola Grendal; Jørn Bue Olsen; Terje Hansen
1976	Melhus	Numedal; Kjell Flesaker; Odd Lunde; Kjell Hovda; Sigleif Johansen	Ringerike; Ivar Olsen; Hans Gulbrandsen; Odd Pedersen; Svein Engen	Østerdal; Sigvart Bjøntegaard; Knut Løvåsen; Tor Svendsberget; Hallvar Muller
1977	Furnes	Ringerike; Ivar Olsen; Nils Sørensen; Odd Pedersen; Svein Engen	Numedal; Kåre Hovda; Odd Lunde; Kjell Flesaker; Kjell Hovda	Inn-Trøndelag; Harald Sotberg; Rune Røli; Stig Kvistad; Tor Northug
1978	Voss	Østerdal; Sigvart Bjøntegaard; Ola Lunde; Kjell Søbak; Tor Svendsberget	Hardanger og Voss; Heine Skogseid; Malvin Hårklau; Jakob Skogseid; Odd Lirhus	Ringerike; Hans Gulbrandsen; Nils Sørensen; Svein Engen; Ivar Olsen
1979	Øvrebø	Hardanger og Voss; Heine Skogseid; Jakob Skogseid; Erling Aga; Odd Lirhus	Inntrøndelag; Stig Kvistad; Sveinung Svarte; Harald Sotberg; Tor Northug	Østerdal; Sigvart Bjøntegaard; Ola Lunde; Tor Svendsberget; Kjell Søbak
1980	Austmarka	Østerdal; Rolf Storsveen; Sigvart Bjøntegaard; Ola Lunde; Kjell Søbak	Hardanger og Voss; Heine Skogseid; Eirik Kvalfoss; Jacob Skogseid; Odd Lirhus	Ringerike; Ivar Olsen; Nils Sørensen; Hans Gulbrandsen; Svein Engen
1981	Bardufoss	Østerdal; Rolf Storsveen; Sigvart Bjøntegaard; Ola Lunde; Kjell Søbak	Uttrøndelag; Johnny Ingdal; Stig Are Sund; Stig Strand; Terje Krokstad	Hardanger og Voss; Jakob Skogseid; Torbjørn Finne; Eirik Kvalfoss; Odd Lirhus
1982	Steinkjer	Hardanger og Voss; Ole Elvebakk; Jakob Skogseid; Eirik Kvalfoss; Odd Lirhus	Østerdal; Øivind Nerhagen; Arne Storsveen; Ola Lunde; Rolf Storsveen	Uttrøndelag; Stig Are Sund; Jon Elvebakken; Halvard Strand; Terje Krokstad
1983	Lygna	Østerdal; Øivind Nerhagen; Arne Storsveen; Rolf Storsveen; Kjell Søbak	Hardanger og Voss; Eirik Kvalfoss; Ole Elvebakk; Jakob Skogseid; Odd Lirhus	Oppland; Geir Elvesveen; Kjell M. Tangen; Svein Engeli; Svein E. Linnerud
1984	Vossestrand	Østerdal; Arne Storsveen; Øivind Nerhagen; Rolf Storsveen; Kjell Søbak	Hardanger og Voss I Ole Elvebakk; Sverre Istad; Gisle Fenne; Eirik Kvalfoss	Hardanger og Voss II; Jacob Skogseid; Magne Istad; Einar Bystøl; Bjørn Finne
1985	Fyresdal	Hedmark; Rolf Storsveen; Johnny Rognstad; Øivind Nerhagen; Kjell Søbak	Hordaland; Ole Elvebakk; Sverre Istad; Gisle Fenne; Eirik Kvalfoss	Sør-Trøndelag; Martin Solberg; Olav Garlid; Halvard Strand; Terje Krokstad
1986	Geilo	Hordaland; Sverre Istad; Magne Istad; Eirik Kvalfoss; Gisle Fenne	Buskerud; Heige Omsland; Kjell Rygg; Hans Jørgen Tveito; Thov Løvstuen	Hedmark; Magnar Dalen; Øivind Nerhagen; Frode Løberg; Kjell Søbak
1987	Tromsø	Hordaland; Lars Fosse; Sverre Istad; Gisle Fenne; Eirik Kvalfoss	Hedmark; Rolf Storsveen; Tommy Olsen; Øivind Nerhagen; Frode Løberg	Oppland; Ivar Michal Ulekleiv; Svein Austlid; Sylfest Glimsdal; Geir Einang
1988	Dombås	Hordaland; Sverre Istad; Magne Istad; Gisle Fenne; Eirik Kvalfoss	Oppland; Geir Einang; Ivar Michal Ulekleiv; Tor Skattebo; Sylfest Glimsdal	Hedmark; Magnar Dalen; Tommy Olsen; Helge Sveen; Øivind Nerhagen
1989	Sørskogsbygda	Hordaland; Lars Fosse; Magne Istad; Gisle Fenne; Eirik Kvalfoss	Oppland; Tor Skattebo; Sylfest Glimsdal; Ivar Michal Ulekleiv; Geir Einang	Buskerud; Nils Anders Lien; Tohr Erik Varsla; Kjell Rygg; Dag Bjørndalen
1990	Voss	Hordaland; Frank Herheim; Sverre Istad; Gisle Fenne; Eirik Kvalfoss	Nord-Trøndelag; Einar Lund; Tom Erik Henden; Arild Larsen; Jon Åge Tyldum	Oppland; Ola Staxrud; Sylfest Glimsdal; Svein Ludvigsen; Geir Einang
1991	Steinkjer	Hordaland; Terje Breivik; Sverre Istad; Eirik Kvalfoss; Gisle Fenne	Oppland; Tor Skattebo; Ivar Michal Ulekleiv; Sylfest Glimsdal; Geir Einang	Hedmark; Kjetil Sæter; Tommy Olsen; Rolf Storsveen; Frode Løberg
1992	Skrautvål	Oppland; Ola Staxrud; Ivar Michal Ulekleiv; Sylfest Glimsdal; Geir Einang	Buskerud; Knut Tore Berland; Ole Einar Bjørndalen; Nils Anders Lien; Dag Bjørndalen	Hordaland; Terje Breivik; Sverre Istad; Eirik Kvalfoss; Gisle Fenne
1993	Hattfjelldal	Nord-Trøndelag; Tom Erik Henden; Ola Vedal; Jo Severin Matberg; Jon Åge Tyldum	Hordaland; Sverre Istad; Terje Breivik; Gisle Fenne; Eirik Kvalfoss	Rogaland; Bård Mjølne; Gunnar Espeland; Arne Idland; Kjell Ove Oftedal
1994	Trondheim	Hordaland; Frank Numedal; Egil Gjelland; Eirik Kvalfoss; Gisle Fenne	Buskerud; Ole Einar Bjørndalen; Dag Bjørndalen; Knut Tore Berland; Frode Andresen	Sør-Trøndelag; Per Erling Myhre; Stig Kalstad; Hans Tore Skjevdal; Halvard Hanevold
1995	Fet	Troms; Stig-Are Eriksen; Bjørn Tore Berntsen; Terje Aune; Tor Espen Kristiansen	Oppland; Lars Westheim; Audun Skattebo; Ivar Michal Ulekleiv; Sylfest Glimsdal	Buskerud; Ole Einar Bjørndalen; Knut Tore Berland; Frode Andresen; Dag Bjørndalen
1996	Brumunddal	Troms I Stig-Are Eriksen; Bjørn Tore Berntsen; Tor Espen Kristiansen; Terje Aune	Buskerud; Kjetil Andre Pedersen; Ole Einar Bjørndalen; Frode Andresen; Dag Bjørndalen	Troms II; Arnt Ove Johansen; Rune Skog; Lars-Thomas Nordkild; Per Nilsen
1997	Snåsa	Buskerud; Frode Andresen; Dag Bjørndalen; Pål Gunnar Mikkelsplass; Ole Einar Bjørndalen	Rogaland; Bård Mjølne; Lars Sigve Oftedal; Torje Håland; Kjell Ove Oftedal	Nord-Østerdal; Helge Sveen; Tommy Olsen; Kjetil Sæter; Jon Per Nygaard
1998	Dokka; Dombås	Buskerud; Ole Einar Bjørndalen; Audun Foss Knudsen; Frode Andresen; Dag Bjørndalen	Troms; Gunnar Eriksen; Stig-Are Eriksen; Tor Espen Kristiansen; Terje Aune	Rogaland; Lars Sigve Oftedal; Kjell Ove Oftedal; Bård Skogholm; Bård Mjølne
1999	Tana	Troms; Stig-Are Eriksen; Tor Espen Kristiansen; Rune Skog; Terje Aune	Rogaland; Lars Sigve Oftedal; Bård Skogholm; Kristian Brekken; Torje Håland	Buskerud; Audun Foss Knudsen; Frode Andresen; Ole Kristian Stoltenberg; Dag Bjørndalen
2000	Meråker; Ål	Buskerud; Audun Foss Knudsen; Frode Andresen; Dag Bjørndalen; Ole Einar Bjørndalen	Akershus; Stian Eckhoff; Henrik Oftedal; Lars Ole Hoel; Halvard Hanevold	Hordaland; Johannes Istad; Tor Halvor Bjørnstad; Johnny Gjerald; Egil Gjelland
2001	Ål	Buskerud; Dag Bjørndalen; Ole Kristian Stoltenberg; Frode Andresen; Ole Einar Bjørndalen	Oslo og Akershus; Kristian Martinsen; Stian Eckhoff; Tobias Torgersen; Halvard Hanevold	Nord-Østerdal; Jon Per Nygaard; Kristian Lund Vang; Tommy Olsen; Hans Prøsch
2002	Nordfjordeid	Buskerud; Ole Kristian Stoltenberg; Dag Bjørndalen; Frode Andresen; Ole Einar Bjørndalen	Oslo og Akershus; Kristian Martinsen; Stian Eckhoff; Tobias Torgersen; Halvard Hanevold	Hordaland; Johnny Gjerald; Egil Gjelland; Bjørn Ove Bergslid; Tor Halvor Bjørnstad
2003	Tromsø	Buskerud; Ole Kristian Stoltenberg; Dag Bjørndalen; Frode Andresen; Ole Einar Bjørndalen	Oslo og Akershus; Kristian Martinsen; Stian Eckhoff; Tobias Torgersen; Halvard Hanevold	Agder; Jon Kristian Svaland; Sigbjørn Mykland; Dan Kjørmo; Anstein Mykland
2004	Steinkjer	Oslo og Akershus; Kristian Martinsen; Tobias Torgersen; Stian Eckhoff; Halvard Hanevold	Agder; Jon Kristian Svaland; Sigbjørn Mykland; Dan Kjørmo; Anstein Mykland	Buskerud; Christian Georg Bache; Dag Bjørndalen; Frode Andresen; Ole Einar Bjørndalen
2005	Bossmo; Ytteren; Skonseng	Oslo og Akershus; Kristian Martinsen; Tobias Torgersen; Stian Eckhoff; Halvard Hanevold	Troms; Hans Prøsch; Rune Skog; Terje Aune; Rune Morten Johansen	Hordaland; Johnny Gjerald; Egil Gjelland; Sindre Hansen; Tor Halvor Bjørnstad
2006	Trondheim; Byåsen	Oslo og Akershus; Kristian Martinsen; Henrik L'Abée-Lund; Stian Eckhoff; Halvard Hanevold	Agder; Jon Kristian Svaland; Sondre Flaa Eieland; Øyvind Svaland; Anstein Mykland	Hordaland; Thomas Fenne; Egil Gjelland; Sindre Hansen; Tor Halvor Bjørnstad
2007	Folldal	Oslo og Akershus; Halvard Hanevold; Lars Stensløkken; Martin Eng; Stian Eckhoff	Sør-Trøndelag; Stian Nåvik; Knut Kuvaas Breivik; Steinar Eidem; Emil Hegle Svendsen	Buskerud; Frode Andresen; Anders Brun Hennum; Eirik Robert Christiansen; Ole Einar Bjørndalen
2008	Stryn	Oslo og Akershus; Magnus L'Abée-Lund; Arild Askestad; Stian Eckhoff; Halvard Hanevold	Buskerud; Eirik Robert Christiansen; Anders Brun Hennum; Frode Andresen; Ole Einar Bjørndalen	Sør-Trøndelag; Stian Nåvik; Øyvind Lund; Sveinung Hestad Strand; Emil Hegle Svendsen
2009	Lillehammer	Buskerud; Christian Georg Bache; Vetle Sjåstad Christiansen; Frode Andresen; Ole Einar Bjørndalen	Oslo og Akershus; Stian Eckhoff; Martin Eng; Henrik L'Abée-Lund; Halvard Hanevold	Agder; Sondre Flaa Eieland; Jon Kristian Svaland; Sverre T. Røiseland; Lars Helge Birkeland
2010	Simostranda	Oslo og Akershus; Magnus L'Abée-Lund; Martin Eng; Christian Sæten; Henrik L'Abée-Lund	Agder; Sondre Flaa Eieland; Øyvind Svaland; Jon Kristian Svaland; Lars Helge Birkeland	Sør-Trøndelag; Espen Årvaag; Henrik Brovold; Espen Forsell; Emil Hegle Svendsen
2011	Målselv	Buskerud; Vetle Sjåstad Christiansen; Frode Andresen; Anders Brun Hennum; Ole Einar Bjørndalen	Oppland; Rune Brattsveen; Vetle Gurigard; Jostein Rogstad; Øyvind Skattebo	Oslo og Akershus; Eirik Bratli; Martin Eng; Christian Sæten; Henrik L'Abée-Lund
2012	Trondheim	Oslo og Akershus; Magnus L'Abée-Lund; Christian Sæten; Andreas Grimstvedt; Henrik L'Abée-Lund	Buskerud; Frode Andresen; Tommi Luchsinger; Erlend Bjøntegaard; Vetle Sjåstad Christiansen	Sør-Trøndelag; Syver Nygård; Andreas Dahlø Wærnes; Arve Lien Johnsen; Emil Hegle Svendsen
2013	Dombås	Sogn og Fjordane; Jarle Midthjell Gjørven; Johannes Thingnes Bø; Håvard Gutubø Bogetveit; Tarjei Bø	Nord-Østerdal; Kristoffer Langøien Skjelvik; Lars Berger; Vegard Bjørn Gjermundshaug; Jan Olav Bjørn Gjermundshaug	Buskerud; Frode Andresen; Martin Lindland; Pål Kristian Grue Tufte; Vetle Sjåstad Christiansen
2014	Voss	Sogn og Fjordane; Jarle Midthjell Gjørven; Johan Eirik Meland; Håvard Gutubø Bogetveit; Johannes Thingnes Bø	Nord-Østerdal; Per Arne Bakken; Tore Leren; Vegard Bjørn Gjermundshaug; Kristoffer Langøien Skjelvik	Oslo og Akershus; Eirik Bratli; Martin Eng; Thomas Berge Foyn; Henrik L'Abée-Lund
2015	Sirdal	Sør-Trøndelag; Tommy Grøtte; Syver Nygård; Andreas Dahlø Wærnes; Emil Hegle Svendsen	Hordaland; Bjarte Mørkve; Thomas Fenne; Bjarte Solvang; Erling Aalvik	Oppland; Amund Owren; Sondre Bollum; Vemund Ravnsborg Gurigard; Vetle Ravnsborg Gurigard
2016	Dombås	Sør-Trøndelag; Tommy Grøtte; Andreas Kvam; Andreas Dahlø Wærnes; Emil Hegle Svendsen	Sogn og Fjordane; Jarle Midthjell Gjørven; Håvard Gutubø Bogetveit; Ole Martin Erdal; Tarjei Bø	Agder; Martin Rui; Håkon Svaland; Lars Aasheim Svaland; Lars Helge Birkeland

=== Team ===
This event was first held in 1990 and was abolished as an event in 1998, as it was at the World Championships and World Cup.

Year	Location	Gold	Silver	Bronze
1990	Dombås	Hordaland; Sverre Istad; Gisle Fenne; Eirik Kvalfoss	Hedmark; Tommy Olsen; Kjetil Sæter; Frode Løberg	Nord-Østerdal; Sigbjørn Nygård; Jon Per Nygaard; Harald Svergja
1991	Orkdalen	Troms; Tor Espen Kristiansen; Bjørn Tore Berntsen; Stig-Are Eriksen	Hedmark; Tommy Olsen; Frode Løberg; Kjetil Sæter	Buskerud; Asle Slettesven; Ole Einar Bjørndalen; Nils Anders Lien
1992	Skrautvål	Troms II; Arnt Ove Johansen; Bjørn Tore Berntsen; Stig-Are Eriksen	Rogaland; Arne Idland; Kjell Ove Oftedal; Bård Mjølne	Buskerud; Dag Bjørndalen; Ole Einar Bjørndalen; Nils Anders Lien
1993	Hattfjelldal	Nord-Trøndelag; Ola Vedal; Jon Åge Tyldum; Jo Severin Matberg	Rogaland; Bård Mjølne; Gunnar Espeland; Arne Idland	Sør-Trøndelag; Terje Tovmo; Per Erling Myhre; Halvard Hanevold
1994	Orkdalen	Hedmark; Kjetil Sæter; Kjetil Storsveen; Dag Ivar Hovde; Frode Løberg	Hordaland; Egil Gjelland; Frank Numedal; Terje Breivik; Gisle Fenne	Troms; Tor Espen Kristiansen; Stig-Are Eriksen; Terje Aune; Lars-Thomas Nordkild
1995	Fet	Troms; Stig-Are Eriksen; Bjørn Tore Berntsen; Tor Espen Kristiansen; Terje Aune	Sogn og Fjordane; Torstein Tvinnreim; Roger Lillestøl; Tor Ivar Kandal; Alfred Tytingvåg	Oppland; Lars Westheim; Audun Skattebo; Svein Tvenge; Ivar Michal Ulekleiv
1996	Brumunddal	Buskerud; Dag Bjørndalen; Pål Gunnar Mikkelsplass; Ole Einar Bjørndalen; Frode Andresen	Troms; Stig-Are Eriksen; Bjørn Tore Berntsen; Terje Aune; Tor Espen Kristiansen	Nord-Østerdal; Tommy Olsen; Helge Sveen; Jon Per Nygaard; Kjetil Sæter
1997	Savalen	Buskerud; Audun Foss Knudsen; Ole Einar Bjørndalen; Dag Bjørndalen; Frode Andresen	Troms; Stig-Are Eriksen; Bjørn Tore Berntsen; Terje Aune; Tor Espen Kristiansen	Nord-Østerdal; Tommy Olsen; Helge Sveen; Jon Per Nygaard; Kjetil Sæter
1998	Dokka; Dombås	Sogn og Fjordane; Roger Lillestøl; Vidar Tistel; Ingar Løvlid; Alfred Tytingvåg	Nord-Østerdal; Tommy Olsen; Hans Prøsch; Helge Sveen; Jon Per Nygaard	Oppland; Torstein Jørstad; Lars Berger; Per Trygve Engen; Tor Håkon Grønli

== Women ==
=== Individual (15 km) ===
This event was first held in 1979. It was not held in 2016.

Year	Location	Gold	Silver	Bronze
1979	Øvrebø	Mette Mestad	Bente Mestad	Lilly Berland
1980	Austmarka	Mette Mestad	Bente Mestad	Mona Hauger
1981	Bardufoss	Ingeborg Nordmo	Iren Grødal	Bente Mestad
1982	Steinkjer	Sonja Larsen	Mette Mestad	Siv Bråten
1983	Lygna	Mette Mestad	Sanna Grønlid	Gry Østvik
1984	Vossestrand	Mette Mestad	Gry Østvik	Sanna Grønlid
1985	Fyresdal	Gry Østvik	Siv Bråten	Sanna Grønlid
1986	Geilo	Siv Bråten	Sanna Grønlid	Helga Øvsthus
1987	Tromsø	Siv Bråten Lunde	Anne Elvebakk	Synnøve Thoresen
1988	Dombås	Elin Kristiansen	Mona Bollerud	Anne Elvebakk
1989	Sørskogsbygda	Mona Bollerud	Synnøve Thoresen	Anne Elvebakk
1990	Voss	Elin Kristiansen	Gunn Fossum	Mona Bollerud
1991	Steinkjer	Anne Elvebakk	Grete Ingeborg Nykkelmo	Synnøve Thoresen
1992	Skrautvål	Anne Elvebakk	Hildegunn Fossen	Gunn Margit Andreassen
1993	Hattfjelldal	Hildegunn Fossen	Åse Idland	Unni Kristiansen
1994	Orkdalen	Hildegunn Fossen	Anne Elvebakk	Signe Trosten
1995	Fet	Gunn Margit Andreassen	Eli Merete Melheim	Ann-Elen Skjelbreid
1996	Brumunddal	Annette Sikveland	Gunn Margit Andreassen	Ann-Elen Skjelbreid
1997	Snåsa	Liv Grete Skjelbreid	Ann-Elen Skjelbreid	Gunn Margit Andreassen
1998	Dokka; Dombås	Liv Grete Skjelbreid	Ann-Elen Skjelbreid	Unni Kristiansen
1999	Tana	Liv Grete Skjelbreid	Gro Marit Istad	Gunn Margit Andreassen
2000	Meråker; Ål	Liv Grete Skjelbreid	Gunn Margit Andreassen	Linda Tjørhom
2001	Ål	Linda Tjørhom	Gunn Margit Andreassen	Liv Kjersti Eikeland
2002	Nordfjordeid	Liv Grete Skjelbreid Poirée	Gunn Margit Andreassen	Ann-Elen Skjelbreid
2003	Tromsø	Ann-Elen Skjelbreid	Linda Tjørhom	Gunn Margit Andreassen
2004	Steinkjer	Anne Ingstadbjørg	Linda Tjørhom	Liv Kjersti Eikeland
2005	Bossmo; Ytteren; Skonseng	Gro Marit Istad Kristiansen	Tora Berger	Jori Mørkve
2006	Trondheim; Byåsen	Linda Tjørhom	Tora Berger	Kari Henneseid Eie
2007	Folldal	Tora Berger	Anne Ingstadbjørg	Julie Bonnevie-Svendsen
2008	Stryn	Julie Bonnevie-Svendsen	Solveig Rogstad	Tora Berger
2009	Lillehammer	Tora Berger	Anne Ingstadbjørg	Gunn Margit Andreassen
2010	Simostranda	Tora Berger	Jori Mørkve	Ann Kristin Flatland
2011	Målselv	Tora Berger	Marte Olsbu	Ann Kristin Flatland
2012	Trondheim	Tora Berger	Synnøve Solemdal	Ane Skrove Nossum
2013	Dombås	Tora Berger	Jori Mørkve	Birgitte Røksund
2014	Voss	Marte Olsbu	Tora Berger	Vilde Ravnsborg Gurigard
2015	Sirdal	Ingrid Landmark Tandrevold	Sigrid Bilstad Neraasen	Marte Olsbu

=== Sprint (7.5 km) ===
This event was first held in 1979.

Year	Location	Gold	Silver	Bronze
1979	Øvrebø	Bente Mestad	Mette Mestad	Lilly Berland
1980	Austmarka	Mette Mestad	Bente Mestad	Mona Hauger
1981	Bardufoss	Bente Mestad	Mette Mestad	Reidun Åsen
1982	Steinkjer	Mette Mestad	Annita Nygård	Bente Mestad
1983	Lygna	Sanna Grønlid	Gry Østvik	Siv Bråten
1984	Vossestrand	Rigmor Hansen	Mette Mestad	Ingeborg N. Krokstad
1985	Fyresdal	Mette Mestad	Bente Mestad	Gry Østvik
1986	Geilo	Sanna Grønlid	Mette Mestad	Anne Elvebakk
1987	Tromsø	Siv Bråten Lunde	Sanna Grønlid	Anne Elvebakk
1988	Dombås	Anne Elvebakk	Elin Kristiansen	Siri Grundnes
1989	Sørskogsbygda	Anne Elvebakk	Synnøve Thoresen	Mona Bollerud
1990	Voss	Grete Ingeborg Nykkelmo	Elin Kristiansen	Synnøve Thoresen
1991	Steinkjer	Grete Ingeborg Nykkelmo	Anne Elvebakk	Unni Kristiansen
1992	Skrautvål	Grete Ingeborg Nykkelmo	Signe Trosten	Ann-Elen Skjelbreid
1993	Brumunddal	Åse Idland	Anne Elvebakk	Annette Sikveland
1994	Trondheim	Annette Sikveland	Anne Elvebakk	Gunn Margit Andreassen
1995	Fet	Ann-Elen Skjelbreid	Liv Grete Skjelbreid	Elin Kristiansen
1996	Brumunddal	Hildegunn Mikkelsplass	Ann-Elen Skjelbreid	Gunn Margit Andreassen
1997	Snåsa	Liv Grete Skjelbreid	Ann-Elen Skjelbreid	Eli Merete Melheim
1998	Dokka; Dombås	Liv Grete Skjelbreid	Hildegunn Mikkelsplass	Annette Sikveland
1999	Tana	Liv Grete Skjelbreid	Ann-Elen Skjelbreid	Gunn Margit Andreassen
2000	Meråker; Ål	Liv Grete Skjelbreid	Linda Tjørhom	Gunn Margit Andreassen
2001	Ål	Gro Marit Istad	Ann-Elen Skjelbreid	Linda Tjørhom
2002	Nordfjordeid	Liv Grete Skjelbreid Poirée	Borghild Ouren	Gunn Margit Andreassen
2003	Tromsø	Gunn Margit Andreassen	Liv Kjersti Eikeland	Borghild Ouren
2004	Steinkjer	Liv Kjersti Eikeland	Gro Marit Istad Kristiansen	Borghild Ouren
2005	Bossmo; Ytteren; Skonseng	Linda Tjørhom	Julie Bonnevie-Svendsen	Gro Marit Istad Kristiansen
2006	Trondheim; Byåsen	Liv Grete Skjelbreid Poirée	Tora Berger	Linda Tjørhom
2007	Folldal	Julie Bonnevie-Svendsen	Anne Ingstadbjørg	Liv Kjersti Eikeland
2008	Stryn	Tora Berger	Julie Bonnevie-Svendsen	Solveig Rogstad
2009	Lillehammer	Julie Bonnevie-Svendsen	Solveig Rogstad	Kari Henneseid Eie
2010	Simostranda	Ann Kristin Flatland	Tora Berger	Synnøve Solemdal
2011	Målselv	Tora Berger	Synnøve Solemdal	Jori Mørkve
2012	Trondheim	Tora Berger	Synnøve Solemdal	Fanny Welle-Strand Horn
2013	Dombås	Tiril Eckhoff	Synnøve Solemdal	Fanny Welle-Strand Horn
2014	Voss	Tora Berger	Tiril Eckhoff	Kaia Wøien Nicolaisen
2015	Sirdal	Marte Olsbu	Ingrid Landmark Tandrevold	Astrid Wathne Matthiessen
2016	Dombås	Synnøve Solemdal	Ingrid Landmark Tandrevold	Marte Olsbu

=== Pursuit (10 km) ===
This event was first held in 1997. It was not held in 2006, 2010 and 2012.

Year	Location	Gold	Silver	Bronze
1997	Savalen	Annette Sikveland	Gunn Margit Andreassen	Åse Idland
1998	Dokka; Dombås	Liv Grete Skjelbreid	Hildegunn Mikkelsplass	Gro Marit Istad
1999	Tana	Gro Marit Istad	Liv Grete Skjelbreid	Gunn Margit Andreassen
2000	Meråker; Ål	Liv Grete Skjelbreid	Linda Tjørhom	Gunn Margit Andreassen
2001	Ål	Gunn Margit Andreassen	Gro Marit Istad	Ann-Elen Skjelbreid
2002	Nordfjordeid	Liv Grete Skjelbreid Poirée	Gunn Margit Andreassen	Linda Tjørhom
2003	Tromsø	Gunn Margit Andreassen	Liv Kjersti Eikeland	Borghild Ouren
2004	Steinkjer	Gro Marit Istad Kristiansen	Linda Tjørhom	Ann Helen Grande
2005	Bossmo; Ytteren; Skonseng	Gro Marit Istad Kristiansen	Linda Tjørhom	Tora Berger
2007	Folldal	Jori Mørkve	Julie Bonnevie-Svendsen	Anne Ingstadbjørg
2008	Stryn	Tora Berger	Solveig Rogstad	Julie Bonnevie-Svendsen
2009	Lillehammer	Julie Bonnevie-Svendsen	Tora Berger	Kari Henneseid Eie
2011	Målselv	Tora Berger	Hilde Fenne	Solveig Rogstad
2013	Dombås	Tora Berger	Tiril Eckhoff	Fanny Welle-Strand Horn
2015	Sirdal	Marte Olsbu	Kaia Wøien Nicolaisen	Ingrid Landmark Tandrevold
2016	Dombås	Synnøve Solemdal	Marte Olsbu	Kaia Wøien Nicolaisen

=== Mass start (12.5 km) ===
This event was first held in 2000. It was not held in 2007, 2008, 2009, 2011 and 2013.

Year	Location	Gold	Silver	Bronze
2000	Meråker; Ål	Linda Tjørhom	Gunn Margit Andreassen	Ann Helen Grande
2001	Ål	Linda Tjørhom	Gunn Margit Andreassen	Ann Helen Grande
2002	Nordfjordeid	Tora Berger	Ann-Elen Skjelbreid	Linda Tjørhom
2003	Tromsø	Linda Tjørhom	Gunn Margit Andreassen	Liv Kjersti Eikeland
2004	Steinkjer	Gro Marit Istad Kristiansen	Linda Tjørhom	Gunn Margit Andreassen
2005	Bossmo; Ytteren; Skonseng	Gro Marit Istad Kristiansen	Linda Tjørhom	Tora Berger
2006	Trondheim; Byåsen	Liv Grete Skjelbreid Poirée	Tora Berger	Liv Kjersti Eikeland
2010	Simostranda	Tora Berger	Fanny Welle-Strand Horn	Ada Ringen
2012	Trondheim	Tora Berger	Synnøve Solemdal	Marte Olsbu
2014	Voss	Tora Berger	Tiril Eckhoff	Marte Olsbu
2016	Dombås	Marte Olsbu	Synnøve Solemdal	Marion Rønning Huber

=== Relay (3 × 6 km) ===
This event was first held in 1979. Through 1988, the event was 3 × 5 km. 1989-2002: 3 × 7.5 km. 2003-: 3 × 6 km.

Year	Location	Gold	Silver	Bronze
1979	Øvrebø	Agder; Mette Mestad; Janne Marit Andreassen; Bente Mestad	Hordaland; Lilly Berland; Eli Midtun; Åse Marie Drangsholt	—
1980	Austmarka	Agder; Mette Mestad; Reidun Åsen; Bente Mestad	Østerdal; Gunn Ottershagen; Anita Nygård; Mona Ottershagen	Solør; Heidi Finnbråten; Åse Torp; Mona Hauger
1981	Bardufoss	Agder; Mette Mestad; Reidun Åsen; Bente Mestad	Østerdal; Anita Nygård; Mona Ottershagen; Gunn Ottershagen	Solør; Gry Østvik; Heidi Finnbråten; Åse Torp
1982	Steinkjer	Agder; Mette Mestad; Reidun Åsen; Bente Mestad	Solør; Gry Østvik; Heidi Finnbråten; Åse Torp	Østerdal; Anita Nygård; Mona Ottershagen; Gunn Ottershagen
1983	Lygna	Agder; Mette Mestad; Reidun Åsen; Bente Mestad	Solør; Gry Østvik; Heidi Finnbråten; Åse Torp	Oppland; Rigmor Hansen; Marit Horgen; Sanna Grønlid
1984	Vossestrand	Troms; Eli Nordmo; Rigmor Hansen; Siri Grundnes	Oppland; Siv Bråten; Marit Horgen; Sanna Grønlid	Agder; Mette Mestad; Reidun Åsen; Bente Mestad
1985	Fyresdal	Oppland; Anita Håkenstad; Siv Bråten; Sanna Grønlid	Sør-Trøndelag; Janne Mette Berg; Bente Bakken; Ingeborg Nordmo Krokstad	Vest-Agder; Mette Mestad; Reidun Åsen; Bente Mestad
1986	Geilo	Oppland; Anita Håkenstad; Siv Bråten; Sanna Grønlid	Hedmark; Gry Østvik; Ellen Brenden; Elin Kristiansen	Vest-Agder; Mette Mestad; Bente Mestad; Inger Aurebekk
1987	Tromsø	Oppland; Inger Strand; Siv Bråten Lunde; Sanna Grønlid	Buskerud; Synnøve Thoresen; Hildegunn Fossen; Mona Bollerud	Hordaland; Ann Lillian Steine; Helga Øvsthus; Anne Elvebakk
1988	Dombås	Hordaland; Helga Øvsthus; Venke Istad; Anne Elvebakk	Hedmark; Siv Bråten Lunde; Unni Kristiansen; Elin Kristiansen	Buskerud; Synnøve Thoresen; Gunn Kjersti Bøygard; Mona Bollerud
1989	Sørskogsbygda	Buskerud; Synnøve Thoresen; Hildegunn Fossen; Mona Bollerud	Hedmark; Nina Søndmør; Unni Kristiansen; Elin Kristiansen	Hordaland; Venke Istad; Anne Lillian Steine; Anne Elvebakk
1990	Voss	Hordaland; Grete Ingeborg Nykkelmo; Helga Øvsthus Fenne; Anne Elvebakk	Buskerud; Synnøve Thoresen; Mona Bollerud; Hildegunn Fossen	Hedmark; Lene Teksum; Unni Kristiansen; Elin Kristiansen
1991	Steinkjer	Buskerud; Synnøve Thoresen; Mona Bollerud; Hildegunn Fossen	Hedmark; Ann-Elen Skjelbreid; Unni Kristiansen; Elin Kristiansen	Hordaland; Grete Ingeborg Nykkelmo; Helga Øvsthus Fenne; Anne Elvebakk
1992	Skrautvål	Buskerud; Synnøve Thoresen; Mona Bollerud; Hildegunn Fossen	Hedmark; Lene Teksum; Unni Kristiansen; Ann-Elen Skjelbreid	Hordaland; Helga Øvsthus Fenne; Liv Grete Skjelbreid; Anne Elvebakk
1993	Hattfjelldal	Rogaland; Annette Sikveland; Åse Idland; Tone Marit Oftedal	Troms; Signe Trosten; Lise Danielsen; Siri Grundnes	Buskerud; Synnøve Thoresen; Mona Bollerud; Hildegunn Fossen
1994	Trondheim	Hordaland; Liv Grete Skjelbreid; Anne Elvebakk; Ann-Elen Skjelbreid	Rogaland; Annette Sikveland; Tone Marit Oftedal; Åse Idland	Aust-Agder; Gunn Margit Andreassen; Karianne Væting; Trude Harstad
1995	Fet	Hedmark; Lene Teksum; Unni Kristiansen; Elin Kristiansen	Hordaland; Liv Grete Skjelbreid; Britt Merete Gjelland; Ann Elen Skjelbreid	Sogn og Fjordane; Eli Merete Melheim; Evelyn Lauvstad; Berit Kolltveit
1996	Brumunddal	Hedmark; Lene Teksum; Unni Kristiansen; Annette Sikveland	Aust-Agder; Trude Harstad; Karianne Væting; Gunn Margit Andreassen	Buskerud; Hildegunn Mikkelsplass; Lene Solum; Gunhild Flatin
1997	Snåsa	Hordaland; Liv Grete Skjelbreid; Liv Kjersti Eikeland; Ann-Elen Skjelbreid	Aust-Agder; Karianne Væting; Trude Harstad; Gunn Margit Andreassen	Buskerud; Hildegunn Mikkelsplass; Ina Guro Sparby; Mari Odda
1998	Dokka; Dombås	Hordaland; Liv Kjersti Eikeland; Gro Marit Istad; Liv Grete Skjelbreid	Sogn og Fjordane; Arna Kolltveit; Evelyn Lauvstad; Eli Merete Melheim	Nord-Trøndelag; Ann Helen Grande; Sanna Solbakken; Solveig Kulseth
1999	Tana	Nord-Trøndelag; Ann Helen Grande; Anne Ingstadbjørg; Sanna Solbakken	Sogn og Fjordane; Arna Kolltveit; Evelyn Lauvstad; Eli Merete Melheim	Oppland; Borghild Ouren; Anne Kjustad; Marion Christensen
2000	Meråker; Ål	Hordaland; Jori Mørkve; Ann-Elen Skjelbreid; Liv Grete Skjelbreid	Oppland; Borghild Ouren; Solveig Rogstad; Tora Berger	Nord-Trøndelag; Solveig Kulseth; Anne Ingstadbjørg; Ann Helen Grande
2001	Ål	Hordaland; Liv Kjersti Eikeland; Gro Marit Istad; Ann-Elen Skjelbreid	Oppland; Borghild Ouren; Solveig Rogstad; Tora Berger	Sogn og Fjordane; Arna Kolltveit; Ann Kristin Flatland; Evelyn Lauvstad Hanevold
2002	Nordfjordeid	Hordaland; Liv Kjersti Eikeland; Liv Grete Skjelbreid Poirée; Ann-Elen Skjelbreid	Oppland; Borghild Ouren; Solveig Rogstad; Tora Berger	Sogn og Fjordane; Evelyn Lauvstad Hanevold; Arna Kolltveit; Ann Kristin Flatland
2003	Tromsø	Agder; Linda Tjørhom; Ann Helene Vatling; Gunn Margit Andreassen	Hordaland; Liv Kjersti Eikeland; Gro Marit Istad Kristiansen; Ann-Elen Skjelbreid	Nord-Trøndelag; Ann Helen Grande; Anne Ingstadbjørg; Ingeborg Ålmo
2004	Steinkjer	Oppland; Borghild Ouren; Solveig Rogstad; Tora Berger	Hordaland; Birgitte Røksund; Liv Kjersti Eikeland; Gro Marit Istad Kristiansen	Oslo og Akershus; Kaja Eckhoff; Julie Bonnevie-Svendsen; Karen Kristoffersen
2005	Bossmo; Ytteren; Skonseng	Hordaland; Liv Kjersti Eikeland; Jori Mørkve; Gro Marit Istad Kristiansen	Oppland; Borghild Ouren; Solveig Rogstad; Tora Berger	Nord-Østerdal; Kari Henneseid Eie; Berit Nordstad; Åshild Sporstad
2006	Trondheim; Byåsen	Hordaland; Liv Grete Skjelbreid Poirée; Jori Mørkve; Liv Kjersti Eikeland	Oppland; Borghild Ouren; Solveig Rogstad; Tora Berger	Oslo og Akershus; Kaja Eckhoff; Fanny Welle-Strand Horn; Marianne Aas Krogh
2007	Folldal	Nord-Trøndelag; Elise Ringen; Ada Ringen; Anne Ingstadbjørg	Hordaland; Jori Mørkve; Anne Mørkve; Liv Kjersti Eikeland	Oslo og Akershus; Karen Kristoffersen; Fanny Welle-Strand Horn; Julie Bonnevie-Svendsen
2008	Stryn	Oslo og Akershus; Tiril Eckhoff; Fanny Welle-Strand Horn; Julie Bonnevie-Svendsen	Hordaland; Liv Kjersti Eikeland; Birgitte Røksund; Jori Mørkve	Nord-Trøndelag; Ada Ringen; Elise Sandvik; Elise Ringen
2009	Lillehammer	Oslo og Akershus; Kaia Wøien Nicolaisen; Fanny Welle-Strand Horn; Julie Bonnevie-Svendsen	Nord-Østerdal; Bente Losgård Landheim; Berit Aasen; Tora Berger	Hordaland; Bjørg Marit Valland; Liv Kjersti Eikeland; Birgitte Røksund
2010	Simostranda	Hordaland; Birgitte Røksund; Anne Mørkve; Jori Mørkve	Nord-Trøndelag; Ada Ringen; Ane Skrove Nossum; Anne Ingstadbjørg	Oslo og Akershus; Kaia Wøien Nicolaisen; Tiril Eckhoff; Fanny Welle-Strand Horn
2011	Målselv	Hordaland; Hilde Fenne; Birgitte Røksund; Jori Mørkve	Nord-Østerdal; Marion Huber; Bente Losgård Landheim; Tora Berger	Oslo og Akershus; Tiril Eckhoff; Heidi Maria Bøhler; Fanny Welle-Strand Horn
2012	Trondheim	Nord-Østerdal; Marion Rønning Huber; Bente Losgård Landheim; Tora Berger	Oslo og Akershus; Thekla Brun-Lie; Tiril Eckhoff; Fanny Welle-Strand Horn	Oppland; Vilde Ravnsborg Gurigard; Maren Wangensteen; Hanne Tingelstad
2013	Dombås	Oslo og Akershus; Rikke Hald Andersen; Fanny Welle-Strand Horn; Tiril Eckhoff	Hordaland; Hilde Fenne; Ann Kristin Flatland; Jori Mørkve	Nord-Østerdal; Marion Rønning Huber; Bente Losgård Landheim; Tora Berger
2014	Voss	Nord-Østerdal; Marion Rønning Huber; Bente Losgård Landheim; Tora Berger	Oslo og Akershus; Kaia Wøien Nicolaisen; Fanny Welle-Strand Horn; Tiril Eckhoff	Hordaland; Ragnhild Femsteinevik; Ann Kristin Flatland; Jori Mørkve
2015	Sirdal	Oslo og Akershus; Rikke Hald Andersen; Sofie Rostad; Kaia Wøien Nicolaisen	Oppland; Hanne Tingelstad; Karoline Knotten; Sigrid Bilstad Neraasen	Nord-Trøndelag; Ane Skrove Nossum; Tonje Marie Skjelstadås; Lotte Lie
2016	Dombås	Hordaland; Ragnhild Femsteinevik; Hilde Fenne; Jori Mørkve	Oslo og Akershus; Karoline Næss; Rikke Hald Andersen; Kristin Hjelstuen	Nord-Østerdal; Eline Grue; Turi Thoresen; Bente Landheim

=== Team ===
This event was first held in 1990 and was abolished as an event in 1998, as it was at the World Championships and World Cup.

Year	Location	Gold	Silver	Bronze
1990	Dombås	Hedmark; Ann-Elen Skjelbreid; Elin Kristiansen; Unni Kristiansen	Rogaland; Tone Oftedal; Annette Sikveland; Åse Idland	Aust-Agder; Trude Harstad; Gunn Margit Andreassen; Gro Harstad
1991	Orkdal	Hedmark; Lene Teksum; Elin Kristiansen; Ann-Elen Skjelbreid	Buskerud; Synnøve Thoresen; Mona Bollerud; Hildegunn Fossen	Hordaland; Liv Grete Skjelbreid; Anne Elvebakk; Helga Øvsthus Fenne
1992	Skrautvål	Hedmark; Lene Teksum; Unni Kristiansen; Ann-Elen Skjelbreid	Troms; Anne Grundnes; Siri Grundnes; Lise Danielsen	Buskerud; Lillian Grønhovd; Anne Hege Holm; Mona Bollerud
1993	Hattfjelldal	Sør-Trøndelag; Jorid Grut; Anita Melting; Anna Stuedal	Troms; Lise Danielsen; Signe Trosten; Siri Grundnes	Buskerud; Synnøve Thoresen; Mona Bollerud; Hildegunn Fossen
1994	Orkdalen	Hordaland; Liv Grete Skjelbreid; Helga Øvsthus Fenne; Ann-Elen Skjelbreid; Anne Elvebakk	Troms; Anne Grundnes; Lise Danielsen; Siri Grundnes; Signe Trosten	Sør-Trøndelag I Nina Kroken; Anna Stuedal; Anita Melting; Laila Hanssen
1995	Fet	Hedmark; Elin Eikeland; Unni Kristiansen; Lene Teksum; Elin Kristiansen	Sør-Trøndelag; Guri Grendal; Jorun Haltbakk; Anita Melting; Hege Enoksen	—
1996	Brumunddal	Aust-Agder; Karianne Væting; Gunn Margit Andreassen; Trude Harstad	Hordaland; Liv Grete Skjelbreid; Ann-Elen Skjelbreid; Gro Marit Istad	Hedmark; Lene Teksum; Unni Kristiansen; Annette Sikveland
1997	Savalen	Aust-Agder; Karianne Væting; Gunn Margit Andreassen; Trude Harstad	Nord-Trøndelag; Solveig Kulseth; Ann Helen Grande; Anne Ingstadbjørg	Sogn og Fjordane; Arna Kolltveit; Eli Merete Melheim; Evelyn Lauvstad
1998	Dokka; Dombås	Buskerud; Birgitte Pedersen; Mari Odda; Elin Bergan	Hordaland; Jori Mørkve; Liv Kjersti Eikeland; Gro Marit Istad	Nord-Trøndelag; Solveig Kulseth; Anne Ingstadbjørg; Sanna Solbakken

== Multiple individual champions ==
Below is a list of the top ten male and female biathletes at the Norwegian Biathlon Championships by individual gold medals. Biathletes whose names are in bold are still active.
Updated: 3 April 2016

Men
Place	Name	Gold medals
**1**	**Ole Einar Bjørndalen**	19
2	Eirik Kvalfoss	9
3	Halvard Hanevold	8
4	Frode Andresen	6
4	**Emil Hegle Svendsen**	6
4	**Tarjei Bø**	6
7	Jon Istad	5
7	Jon Åge Tyldum	5
9	Lars Berger	4
9	Svein Engen	4
9	Sigleif Johansen	4

Women
Place	Name	Gold medals
**1**	Tora Berger	17
2	Liv Grete Skjelbreid Poirée	15
3	Gro Marit Istad Kristiansen	7
3	Mette Mestad	7
5	Linda Grubben	6
6	Julie Bonnevie-Svendsen	4
6	Gunn Margit Andreassen	4
6	Anne Elvebakk	4
6	Siv Bråten Lunde	4
6	**Marte Olsbu**	4

== See also ==
- Biathlon World Championships

== Notes ==
1. ^{1} The Norwegian Biathlon Association and Hans Lysaker sources disagree here, should possibly be Ola Lunde rather than Odd Lunde. However, Aftenposten agrees with Hans Lysaker and so that source has been given precedent.
