= Norwegian Biathlon Championships 1990 =

Biathlon competition in Norway

The 32nd Norwegian Biathlon Championships were held in Myrkdalen, Voss Municipality, Hordaland, Norway from 1 March to 4 March 1990 at the stadium Årmotslia skisenter, arranged by Voss SSL. There were 6 scheduled competitions: individual, sprint, and relay races for men and women. The team races for men and women, arranged by Dombås IL, were held concurrently with the final races of the Norwegian Biathlon Cup (Norgescupen) in Dombås, Oppland on 25 March, at the stadium Dombås skiskytterstadion.

== Schedule ==
All times are local (UTC+1).

Date	Time	Event
1 March		Women's 15 km individual
1 March		Men's 20 km individual
3 March		Women's 7.5 km sprint
3 March		Men's 10 km sprint
4 March		Women's 3 × 7.5 km relay
4 March		Men's 4 × 7.5 km relay
...
25 March		Women's 10 km team event
25 March		Men's 15 km team event

== Medal winners ==
=== Men ===
Event	Gold		Silver		Bronze	
20 km individual	Frode Løberg; Elverum IL	59:43.2 (0+1+0+1)	Eirik Kvalfoss; Voss SSL	59:56.5 (0+0+2+2)	Gisle Fenne; Voss SSL/Home Guard District 10	1:00:31.2 (2+0+1+1)
10 km sprint	Sverre Istad; Voss SSL/Home Guard District 10	28:37.4 (1+1)	Eirik Kvalfoss; Voss SSL	29:00.7 (1+2)	Gisle Fenne; Voss SSL/Home Guard District 10	29:06.4 (0+2)
15 km team event	Hordaland; Sverre Istad; Gisle Fenne; Eirik Kvalfoss	43:37 (1) (2) (0)	Hedmark; Tommy Olsen; Kjetil Sæter; Frode Løberg	44:36 (1) (1) (2)	Nord-Østerdal; Sigbjørn Nygård; Jon Per Nygaard; Harald Svergja	46:14 (0) (2) (1)
4 × 7.5 km relay	Hordaland I Frank Herheim; Sverre Istad; Gisle Fenne; Eirik Kvalfoss	1:33:24 (1)	Nord-Trøndelag I Einar Lund; Tom Erik Henden; Arild Larsen; Jon Åge Tyldum	1:33:55 (0)	Oppland I Ola Staxrud; Sylfest Glimsdal; Svein Ludvigsen; Geir Einang	1:34:33 (3)

=== Women ===
Event	Gold		Silver		Bronze	
15 km individual	Elin Kristiansen; Vestre Trysil IL/Home Guard District 05	51:46.5 (1+0+0+0)	Gunn Fossum; Simostranda IL	54:48.7 (1+2+0+1)	Mona Bollerud; Fiskum	55:02.7 (0+0+1+1)
7.5 km sprint	Grete Ingeborg Nykkelmo; Voss SSL	24:44.6 (0+0)	Elin Kristiansen; Vestre Trysil IL/Home Guard District 05	26:29.7 (0+1)	Synnøve Thoresen; Simostranda IL	26:34.3 (0+1)
10 km team event	Hedmark; Ann-Elen Skjelbreid; Elin Kristiansen; Unni Kristiansen	36:52 (1) (1) (0)	Rogaland; Tone Oftedal; Annette Sikveland; Åse Idland	42:55 (0) (2) (3)	Aust-Agder; Trude Harstad; Gunn Margit Andreassen; Gro Harstad	43:34 (0) (4) (3)
3 × 7.5 km relay	Hordaland I Grete Ingeborg Nykkelmo; Helga Øvsthus Fenne; Anne Elvebakk	1:23:47 (3)	Buskerud; Synnøve Thoresen; Mona Bollerud; Hildegunn Fossen	1:24:06 (1)	Hedmark; Lene Teksum; Unni Kristiansen; Elin Kristiansen	1:27:18 (2)
