= Norwegian Biathlon Championships 1991 =

Biathlon competition in Norway

The 33rd Norwegian Biathlon Championships were held in Steinkjer Municipality in Nord-Trøndelag county, Norway from 10 January to 13 January 1991 at the stadium Steinkjer skistadion, arranged by Steinkjer SK. There were 6 scheduled competitions: individual, sprint, and relay races for men and women. The team races for men and women were held on 24 March, concurrently with the final races of the Norwegian Biathlon Cup (Norgescupen), in Orkdal Municipality, at the stadium Knyken Skisenter, arranged by Orkdal IL.

In the men's relay, Rolf Storsveen came out of retirement to race for the team from Hedmark, winning bronze.

== Schedule ==
All times are local (UTC+1).

| Date | Time | Event |
|---|---|---|
| 10 January | | Women's 15 km individual |
| 10 January | | Men's 20 km individual |
| 12 January | 11:00 | Women's 7.5 km sprint |
| 12 January | 12:15 | Men's 10 km sprint |
| 13 January | 10:30 | Women's 3 × 7.5 km relay |
| 13 January | 12:30 | Men's 4 × 7.5 km relay |
...
| 24 March | | Women's 10 km team event |
| 24 March | | Men's 15 km team event |

== Medal winners ==
=== Men ===
| Event | Gold | | Silver | | Bronze | |
|---|---|---|---|---|---|---|
| 20 km individual | Gisle Fenne; Voss SSL | | Sverre Istad; Voss SSL | | Frode Løberg; Elverum IL | |
| 10 km sprint | Jon Åge Tyldum; Snåsa SSL | 29:12 (0+1) | Eirik Kvalfoss; Voss SSL | 29:20 (1+0) | Geir Einang; Vestre Slidre IL | 29:28 (0+1) |
| 15 km team event | Troms; Tor Espen Kristiansen; Bjørn Tore Berntsen; Stig-Are Eriksen | 45:57 (0) (2) (0) | Hedmark; Tommy Olsen; Frode Løberg; Kjetil Sæter | 46:46 (1) (2) (0) | Buskerud; Asle Slettesven; Ole Einar Bjørndalen; Nils Anders Lien | 47:17 (0) (2) (0) |
| 4 × 7.5 km relay | Hordaland; Terje Breivik; Sverre Istad; Eirik Kvalfoss; Gisle Fenne | 1:33:35.2; 23:56 (0); 22:46 (0); 23:50 (2); 23:02 (0) | Oppland; Tor Skattebo; Ivar Michal Ulekleiv; Sylfest Glimsdal; Geir Einang | 1:33:35.7; 23:44 (2); 22:31 (0); 24:19 (2); 23:01 (0) | Hedmark; Kjetil Sæter; Tommy Olsen; Rolf Storsveen; Frode Løberg | 1:35:50.5; 23:40 (1); 23:41 (0); 23:57 (0); 24:31 (0) |

=== Women ===
| Event | Gold | | Silver | | Bronze | |
|---|---|---|---|---|---|---|
| 15 km individual | Anne Elvebakk; Voss SSL | | Grete Ingeborg Nykkelmo; Voss SSL | | Synnøve Thoresen; Simostranda IL | |
| 7.5 km sprint | Grete Ingeborg Nykkelmo; Voss SSL | 26:29.6 (1+1) | Anne Elvebakk; Voss SSL | 27:06.7 (1+1) | Unni Kristiansen; Vestre Trysil IL | 27:33.9 (0+0) |
| 10 km team event | Hedmark; Lene Teksum; Elin Kristiansen; Ann-Elen Skjelbreid | 40:52 (1) (1) (1) | Buskerud; Synnøve Thoresen; Mona Bollerud; Hildegunn Fossen | 44:11 (2) (3) (0) | Hordaland; Liv Grete Skjelbreid; Anne Elvebakk; Helga Øvsthus Fenne | 44:49 (4) (2) (1) |
| 3 × 7.5 km relay | Buskerud; Synnøve Thoresen; Mona Bollerud; Hildegunn Fossen | 1:21:34.5; 27:12 (0); 28:11 (0); 26:10 (0) | Hedmark; Ann-Elen Skjelbreid; Unni Kristiansen; Elin Kristiansen | 1:23:03.8; 27:54 (1); 28:27 (0); 26:41 (0) | Hordaland; Grete Ingeborg Nykkelmo; Helga Øvsthus Fenne; Anne Elvebakk | 1:23:40.5; 26:40 (2); 29:11 (2); 27:48 (3) |
