= Norwegian Biathlon Championships 1993 =

Biathlon competition in Norway

The 35th Norwegian Biathlon Championships were held in Hattfjelldal Municipality in Nordland county, Norway from 25 February to 28 February 1993 at the stadium Hattfjelldal skistadion, arranged by Hattfjelldal IL. There were 6 scheduled competitions: individual, team, and relay races for men and women. The sprint races for men and women were held on 9 January in Brumunddal, Norway.

In the women's relay, the Buskerud team crossed the finish line first, but received a one-minute penalty, and thus won bronze.

== Schedule ==
All times are local (UTC+1).

Date	Time	Event
9 January		Women's 7.5 km sprint
9 January		Men's 10 km sprint
...
25 February		Women's 10 km team event
25 February		Men's 15 km team event
27 February		Women's 15 km individual
27 February		Men's 20 km individual
28 February		Women's 3 × 7.5 km relay
28 February		Men's 4 × 7.5 km relay

== Medal winners ==
=== Men ===
Event	Gold		Silver		Bronze	
20 km individual	Eirik Kvalfoss; Voss SSL	59:20.8 (1+1+1+0)	Frode Løberg; Hernes IL	1:00:02.9 (2+1+0+0)	Gisle Fenne; Voss SSL	1:00:25.8 (1+1+0+1)
10 km sprint	Ivar Michal Ulekleiv; Dovre IL	31:35 (0+0)	Dag Bjørndalen; Simostranda IL	32:53 (0+0)	Jon Åge Tyldum; Snåsa SSL	33:19 (2+0)
15 km team event	Nord-Trøndelag; Ola Vedal; Jon Åge Tyldum; Jo Severin Matberg	40:37 (0)	Rogaland; Bård Mjølne; Gunnar Espeland; Arne Idland	41:50 (1)	Sør-Trøndelag I Terje Tovmo; Per Erling Myhre; Halvard Hanevold	41:59 (1)
4 × 7.5 km relay	Nord-Trøndelag; Tom Erik Henden; Ola Vedal; Jo Severin Matberg; Jon Åge Tyldum	1:28:09 (0) (1) (0) (0)	Hordaland; Sverre Istad; Terje Breivik; Gisle Fenne; Eirik Kvalfoss	1:28:27 (2) (0) (0) (0)	Rogaland; Bård Mjølne; Gunnar Espeland; Arne Idland; Kjell Ove Oftedal	1:29:11 (0) (0) (0) (0)

=== Women ===
Event	Gold		Silver		Bronze	
15 km individual	Hildegunn Fossen; Simostranda IL	54:40.9 (0+1+0+1)	Åse Idland; Figgjo IL	54:52.1 (0+0+1+1)	Unni Kristiansen; Vestre Trysil IL	55:10.0 (1+0+1+0)
7.5 km sprint	Åse Idland; Figgjo IL	27:24 (1+1)	Anne Elvebakk; Voss SSL	27:30 (0+1)	Annette Sikveland; Figgjo IL	27:33 (0+1)
10 km team event	Sør-Trøndelag; Jorid Grut; Anita Melting; Anna Stuedal	39:03 (1)	Troms; Lise Danielsen; Signe Trosten; Siri Grundnes	39:54 (4)	Buskerud; Synnøve Thoresen; Mona Bollerud; Hildegunn Fossen	39:58 (4)
3 × 7.5 km relay	Rogaland; Annette Sikveland; Åse Idland; Tone Marit Oftedal	1:22:10 (0) (2) (0)	Troms; Signe Trosten; Lise Danielsen; Siri Grundnes	1:22:41 (0) (1) (1)	Buskerud; Synnøve Thoresen; Mona Bollerud; Hildegunn Fossen	1:23:00 (0) (0) (0)
