= Norwegian Biathlon Championships 1992 =

Biathlon competition in Norway

The 34th Norwegian Biathlon Championships were held in Skrautvål, Oppland, Norway from 9 January to 12 January 1992 at the stadium Valdres Skisenter, arranged by Skrautvål IL. There were 6 scheduled competitions: individual, sprint, and relay races for men and women. The team races for men and women were held on 22 March, concurrently with the final races of the Norwegian Biathlon Cup (Norgescupen), in Målselv Municipality, at the stadium Bardufoss Skisenter.

For the first time, NRK, the Norwegian government-owned radio and television public broadcasting company, broadcast the championship races in Skrautvål live on television.

== Schedule ==
All times are local (UTC+1).

Date	Time	Event
9 January		Women's 15 km individual
9 January		Men's 20 km individual
11 January		Women's 7.5 km sprint
11 January		Men's 10 km sprint
12 January		Women's 3 × 7.5 km relay
12 January		Men's 4 × 7.5 km relay
...
22 March		Women's 10 km team event
22 March		Men's 15 km team event

== Medal winners ==
=== Men ===
Event	Gold		Silver		Bronze	
20 km individual	Jon Åge Tyldum; Snåsa SSL	1:02:32.3 (2+0+0+0)	Eirik Kvalfoss; Voss SSL	1:02:36.9 (0+0+0+1)	Geir Einang; Vestre Slidre IL	1:03:40.5 (1+1+0+1)
10 km sprint	Jon Åge Tyldum; Snåsa SSL	28:43.0 (0+2)	Gisle Fenne; Voss SSL	29:29.8 (1+2)	Tor Espen Kristiansen; Bjerkvik IF	29:58.7 (1+1)
15 km team event	Troms II; Arnt Ove Johansen; Bjørn Tore Berntsen; Stig-Are Eriksen	47:37 (0) (3) (0)	Rogaland; Arne Idland; Kjell Ove Oftedal; Bård Mjølne	47:49 (0) (1) (1)	Buskerud; Dag Bjørndalen; Ole Einar Bjørndalen; Nils Anders Lien	47:56 (1) (2) (1)
4 × 7.5 km relay	Oppland; Ola Staxrud; Ivar Michal Ulekleiv; Sylfest Glimsdal; Geir Einang	1:29:41.2; 23:43.5 (0); 21:48.4 (0); 22:04.0 (0); 22:05.3 (0)	Buskerud; Knut Tore Berland; Ole Einar Bjørndalen; Nils Anders Lien; Dag Bjørndalen	1:30:33.7; 24:36.2 (0); 22:20.4 (0); 22:13.3 (0); 21:23.8 (0)	Hordaland; Terje Breivik; Sverre Istad; Eirik Kvalfoss; Gisle Fenne	1:30:46.1; 25:03.5 (0); 22:49.5 (1); 21:24.8 (0); 21:28.3 (0)

=== Women ===
Event	Gold		Silver		Bronze	
15 km individual	Anne Elvebakk; Voss SSL	1:02:20.3 (2+2+2+1)	Hildegunn Fossen; Simostranda IL	1:02:24.6 (1+1+2+3)	Gunn Margit Andreassen; Birkenes IL/Sirdal Ski	1:03:05.0 (1+1+0+1)
7.5 km sprint	Grete Ingeborg Nykkelmo; Voss SSL	28:03.5 (2+3)	Signe Trosten; Tana SSL	28:27.4 (2+2)	Ann-Elen Skjelbreid; Trysil	28:28.9 (3+1)
10 km team event	Hedmark; Lene Teksum; Unni Kristiansen; Ann-Elen Skjelbreid	39:52 (1) (0) (2)	Troms; Anne Grundnes; Siri Grundnes; Lise Danielsen	40:26 (1) (1) (1)	Buskerud; Lillian Grønhovd; Anne Hege Holm; Mona Bollerud	44:03 (2) (2) (0)
3 × 7.5 km relay	Buskerud; Synnøve Thoresen; Mona Bollerud; Hildegunn Fossen	1:23:51.7; 28:02.1 (0); 29:12.0 (0); 26:37.6 (0)	Hedmark; Lene Teksum; Unni Kristiansen; Ann-Elen Skjelbreid	1:24:17.1; 29:34.1 (1); 26:58.3 (0); 27:44.7 (0)	Hordaland; Helga Øvsthus Fenne; Liv Grete Skjelbreid; Anne Elvebakk	1:25:03.5; 29:15.0 (0); 28:04.3 (0); 27:44.2 (2)
