= Norwegian Biathlon Championships 2012 =

The 54th Norwegian Biathlon Championships were held in Trondheim from 21 March to 25 March 2012 at the stadium Saupstad Skisenter, arranged by Trondhjems Skiskyttere and Byåsen SSL. There were a total of 8 scheduled competitions: individual, sprint, mass start and relay races for men and women.

Ole Einar Bjørndalen did not participate in any races.

== Schedule ==
All times are local (UTC+1).

Date	Time	Event
21 March		Women's 15 km individual
21 March		Men's 20 km individual
23 March		Women's 7.5 km sprint
23 March		Men's 10 km sprint
24 March		Women's 10 km pursuit
24 March		Men's 12.5 km pursuit
25 March		Women's 3 × 6 km relay
25 March		Men's 4 × 7.5 km relay

== Medal winners ==
=== Men ===
Event	Gold		Silver		Bronze	
20 km individual details	Tarjei Bø; Markane IL	48:22.6 (0+1+0+1)	Dag Erik Kokkin; Åsnes SSL	50:08.4 (0+0+0+1)	Rune Brattsveen; Nordre Land IL	50:56.2 (0+2+0+1)
10 km sprint details	Emil Hegle Svendsen; Trondhjems Skiskyttere	24:35.3 (0+0)	Lars Berger; Dombås IL	24:43.7 (0+2)	Stian Gilje; Sandnes SSL	25:23.1 (0+0)
15 km mass start details	Rune Brattsveen; Nordre Land IL	40:05.6 (0+1+0+0)	Lars Berger; Dombås IL	41:03.2 (1+1+2+2)	Emil Hegle Svendsen; Trondhjems Skiskyttere	41:28.8 (1+1+2+1)
4 × 7.5 km relay details	Oslo og Akershus I Magnus L'Abée-Lund; Christian Sæten; Andreas Grimstvedt; Henrik L'Abée-Lund	1:10:15.1 (0+0) (0+0) (0+0) (0+1)	Buskerud I Frode Andresen; Tommi Luschinger; Erlend Bjøntegaard; Vetle Sjåstad Christiansen	1:10:24.3 (2+0) (0+1) (0+0) (0+0)	Sør-Trøndelag I Syver Nygård; Andreas Dahlø Wærnes; Arve Lien Johnsen; Emil Hegle Svendsen	1:11:02.1 (0+0) (0+0) (0+1) (0+0)

=== Women ===
Event	Gold		Silver		Bronze	
15 km individual details	Tora Berger; Dombås IL	45:12.7 (1+0+0+0)	Synnøve Solemdal; Tingvoll IL	47:56.7 (1+0+3+0)	Ane Skrove Nossum; Stiklestad IL	48:21.2 (1+0+0+2)
7.5 km sprint details	Tora Berger; Dombås IL	18:54.2 (0+1)	Synnøve Solemdal; Tingvoll IL	19:00.9 (1+1)	Fanny Welle-Strand Horn; Oslo SSL	19:31.3 (0+1)
12.5 km mass start details	Tora Berger; Dombås IL	34:20.2 (1+0+1+0)	Synnøve Solemdal; Tingvoll IL	35:03.6 (1+1+2+0)	Marte Olsbu; Froland IL	37:06.9 (1+0+1+0)
3 × 6 km relay details	Nord-Østerdal I Marion Rønning Huber; Bente Losgård Landheim; Tora Berger	51:03.5 (0+1) (0+0) (0+0)	Oslo og Akershus I Thekla Brun-Lie; Tiril Eckhoff; Fanny Welle-Strand Horn	51:25.7 (0+0) (0+0) (0+0)	Oppland I Vilde Ravnsborg Gurigard; Maren Wangensteen; Hanne Tingelstad	52:03.8 (0+0) (0+0) (0+0)
