= Norwegian Biathlon Championships 2014 =

Biathlon competition in Norway

The 56th Norwegian Biathlon Championships were held in Voss Municipality, Hordaland, Norway, from 25 March to 30 March 2014 at the stadium Voss ski- og tursenter, arranged by Voss SSL. There were a total of 8 scheduled competitions: individual, sprint, mass start, and relay races for men and women. The stadium had been fitted with new electronic targets made from rubber rather than the conventional metal. Based on the sound made when the bullet hit the target, the computer system calculated exactly where the bullet hit. The targets were produced by Megalink AS.

Ole Einar Bjørndalen did not participate in any races due to fever, but still appeared at the stadium during the championships, mingling with the fans and even commentating on the men's mass start for the Norwegian Broadcasting Corporation. Emil Hegle Svendsen and Tarjei Bø also missed the races due to illness.

== Schedule ==
All times are local (UTC+1).

Date	Time	Event
26 March	10:15	Women's 15 km individual
26 March	11:30	Men's 20 km individual
28 March	16:00	Women's 7.5 km sprint
28 March	16:55	Men's 10 km sprint
29 March	17:10	Women's 12.5 km mass start
29 March	18:05	Men's 15 km mass start
30 March	11:35	Women's 3 × 6 km relay
30 March	13:10	Men's 4 × 7.5 km relay

== Medal winners ==
=== Men ===
Event	Gold		Silver		Bronze	
20 km individual details	Johannes Thingnes Bø; Markane IL	50:17.1 (1+0+0+2)	Vegard Bjørn Gjermundshaug; Alvdal IL	50:45.3 (0+0+0+2)	Henrik L'Abée-Lund; Oslo SSL	50:48.0 (1+0+1+0)
10 km sprint details	Johannes Thingnes Bø; Markane IL	24:05.9 (0+0)	Erlend Bjøntegaard; IL Bever'n	24:43.4 (0+1)	Kristoffer Langøien Skjelvik; Os IL	24:49.9 (0+1)
15 km mass start details	Kristoffer Langøien Skjelvik; Os IL	38:45.6 (0+0+1+0)	Vetle Sjåstad Christiansen; Geilo IL	38:58.3 (2+0+0+1)	Erlend Bjøntegaard; IL Bever'n	39:45.5 (0+1+1+1)
4 × 7.5 km relay details	Sogn og Fjordane; Jarle Midthjell Gjørven; Johan Eirik Meland; Håvard Gutubø Bogetveit; Johannes Thingnes Bø	1:16:43.4 (0+0) (0+3) (0+0) (0+2) (0+1) (0+1) (0+0) (2+3)	Nord-Østerdal I Per Arne Bakken; Tore Leren; Vegard Bjørn Gjermundshaug; Kristoffer Langøien Skjelvik	1:17:19.3 (0+1) (0+2) (0+1) (0+3) (0+3) (1+3) (0+1) (0+2)	Oslo og Akershus I Eirik Bratli; Martin Eng; Thomas Berge Foyn; Henrik L'Abée-Lund	1:18:15.7 (0+3) (0+3) (0+0) (0+1) (0+0) (2+3) (0+1) (0+0)

=== Women ===
Event	Gold		Silver		Bronze	
15 km individual details	Marte Olsbu; Froland IL	48:59.3 (0+0+0+1)	Tora Berger; Dombås IL	51:48.8 (3+2+0+1)	Vilde Ravnsborg Gurigard; Vingrom IL	53:00.7 (1+0+2+1)
7.5 km sprint details	Tora Berger; Dombås IL	20:28.8 (1+0)	Tiril Eckhoff; Fossum IF	20:30.2 (0+1)	Kaia Wøien Nicolaisen; Asker SK	21:59.5 (1+1)
12.5 km mass start details	Tora Berger; Dombås IL	35:41.5 (0+0+0+2)	Tiril Eckhoff; Fossum IF	36:16.4 (0+1+1+1)	Marte Olsbu; Froland IL	36:27.1 (0+1+1+1)
3 × 6 km relay details	Nord-Østerdal I Marion Rønning Huber; Bente Losgård Landheim; Tora Berger	49:21.3 (0+0) (1+3) (0+2) (0+0) (0+0) (0+2)	Oslo og Akershus I Kaia Wøien Nicolaisen; Fanny Welle-Strand Horn; Tiril Eckhoff	49:29.5 (0+2) (0+2) (0+1) (0+3) (0+1) (0+3)	Hordaland I Ragnhild Femsteinevik; Ann Kristin Flatland; Jori Mørkve	51:14.1 (0+2) (1+3) (0+1) (0+0) (0+1) (0+1)
