= Gjelten =

Gjelten is a surname. Notable people with the surname include:

- Esten Gjelten (born 1942), Norwegian biathlete
- Per Gjelten (1927–1991), Norwegian Nordic skier
- Tom Gjelten (born 1948), American broadcaster
