= Bollerud =

Bollerud is a surname. Notable people with the surname include:

- Ingunn Bollerud (born 1972), Norwegian cyclist
- Mona Bollerud (born 1968), Norwegian biathlete
