= Norwegian Biathlon Championships 2013 =

Biathlon competition in Norway

The 55th Norwegian Biathlon Championships were held in Dombås, Oppland, Norway from 20 March to 24 March 2013 at the stadium Sparebank 1 skiarena, arranged by Dombås IL. There were a total of 8 scheduled competitions: individual, sprint, pursuit and relay races for men and women.

Ole Einar Bjørndalen did not participate in any races.

== Schedule ==
All times are local (UTC+1).

Date	Time	Event
20 March	14:00	Men's 20 km individual
20 March	16:00	Women's 15 km individual
22 March	10:30	Women's 7.5 km sprint
22 March	13:00	Men's 10 km sprint
23 March	14:30	Women's 10 km pursuit
23 March	15:45	Men's 12.5 km pursuit
24 March	10:00	Women's 3 × 6 km relay
24 March	12:30	Men's 4 × 7.5 km relay

== Medal winners ==
=== Men ===
Event	Gold		Silver		Bronze	
20 km individual details	Vegard Bjørn Gjermundshaug; Alvdal IL	52:37.0 (0+1+0+0)	Lars Helge Birkeland; Birkenes IL	52:43.9 (0+0+0+2)	Dag Erik Kokkin; Åsnes SSL	53:41.2 (0+0+0+1)
10 km sprint details	Lars Berger; Dombås IL	25:12.7 (0+2)	Johannes Thingnes Bø; Markane IL	25:41.1 (0+2)	Emil Hegle Svendsen; Trondhjems Skiskyttere	25:58.4 (1+1)
12.5 km pursuit details	Emil Hegle Svendsen; Trondhjems Skiskyttere	56:10.2 (0+0+1+0)	Johannes Thingnes Bø; Markane IL	56:15.1 (0+0+2+0)	Lars Berger; Dombås IL	56:27.3 (1+0+2+2)
4 × 7.5 km relay details	Sogn og Fjordane; Jarle Midthjell Gjørven; Johannes Thingnes Bø; Håvard Gutubø Bogetveit; Tarjei Bø	1:12:07.5 (0+0) (0+0) (0+0) (0+0)	Nord-Østerdal I Kristoffer Langøien Skjelvik; Lars Berger; Vegard Bjørn Gjermundshaug; Jan Olav Bjørn Gjermundshaug	1:13:31.1 (0+0) (0+0) (0+1) (0+0)	Buskerud I Frode Andresen; Martin Lindland; Pål Kristian Grue Tufte; Vetle Sjåstad Christiansen	1:14:04.1 (0+0) (0+0) (0+0) (0+0)

=== Women ===
Event	Gold		Silver		Bronze	
15 km individual details	Tora Berger; Dombås IL	47:00.2 (0+2+0+2)	Jori Mørkve; Eldar IL	47:47.3 (0+2+0+0)	Birgitte Røksund; Fana IL	47:56.4 (1+1+0+0)
7.5 km sprint details	Tiril Eckhoff; Fossum IF	20:44.1 (0+1)	Synnøve Solemdal; Tingvoll IL	20:51.4 (1+1)	Fanny Welle-Strand Horn; Oslo SSL	20:54.3 (0+2)
10 km pursuit details	Tora Berger; Dombås IL	50:11.9 (0+0+0+0)	Tiril Eckhoff; Fossum IF	50:54.9 (2+1+0+1)	Fanny Welle-Strand Horn; Oslo SSL	51:23.8 (1+2+0+1)
3 × 6 km relay details	Oslo og Akershus I Rikke Hald Andersen; Fanny Welle-Strand Horn; Tiril Eckhoff	53:03.1 (1+0) (0+0) (0+0)	Hordaland I Hilde Fenne; Ann Kristin Flatland; Jori Mørkve	53:29.2 (0+0) (0+0) (0+0)	Nord-Østerdal I Marion Rønning Huber; Bente Losgård Landheim; Tora Berger	54:03.3 (1+0) (0+0) (0+0)
