= Norwegian Biathlon Championships 2016 =

Biathlon competition in Norway

The 58th Norwegian Biathlon Championships were held in Dombås, Oppland, Norway from 31 March to 3 April 2016 at the stadium Dombås Skiarena, arranged by Dombås IL. There were a total of 8 scheduled competitions: sprint, pursuit, mass start and relay races for men and women.

Ole Einar Bjørndalen only participated in the mass start.

== Schedule ==
All times are local (UTC+1).

Date	Time	Event
31 March	16:00	Men's 4 × 7.5 km relay
31 March	17:30	Women's 3 × 6 km relay
1 April	09:30	Men's 10 km sprint
1 April	12:15	Women's 7.5 km sprint
2 April	10:00	Men's 12.5 km pursuit
2 April	11:00	Women's 10 km pursuit
3 April	10:15	Women's 12.5 km mass start
3 April	11:15	Men's 15 km mass start

== Medal winners ==
=== Men ===
Event	Gold		Silver		Bronze	
10 km sprint details	Thomas Fenne; Voss SSL	24:27.6 (0+0)	Andreas Dahlø Wærnes; Trondhjems Skiskyttere	24:29.1 (0+1)	Johannes Dale; Fet Skiklubb - Skiskyting	24:30.3 (0+0)
12.5 km pursuit details	Lars Helge Birkeland; Birkenes IL	57:41.1 (0+0+1+0)	Aleksander Fjeld Andersen; Geilo IL	58:06.3 (0+0+2+1)	Henrik L'Abée-Lund; Oslo SSL	58:59.9 (0+1+0+3)
15 km mass start details	Tarjei Bø; Markane IL	34:08.8 (0+0+2+0)	Alexander Os; Ishavslaget	34:09.9 (1+0+1+0)	Lars Helge Birkeland; Birkenes IL	34:10.0 (1+0+1+0)
4 × 7.5 km relay details	Sør-Trøndelag I Tommy Grøtte; Andreas Kvam; Andreas Dahlø Wærnes; Emil Hegle Svendsen	1:11:41.5; 17:41.0 (0+0); 17:58.8 (1+0); 18:16.7 (1+0); 17:45.0 (0+0)	Sogn og Fjordane I Jarle Midthjell Gjørven; Håvard Gutubø Bogetveit; Ole Martin Erdal; Tarjei Bø	1:12:01.5; 18:38.0 (0+0); 17:32.4 (0+0); 17:34.7 (0+0); 18:16.4 (0+1)	Agder I Martin Rui; Håkon Svaland; Lars Aasheim Svaland; Lars Helge Birkeland	1:12:07.5; 18:16.0 (0+0); 18:23.3 (0+0); 17:53.6 (0+0); 17:34.6 (0+0)

=== Women ===
Event	Gold		Silver		Bronze	
7.5 km sprint details	Synnøve Solemdal; Tingvoll IL	19:01.7 (0+1)	Ingrid Landmark Tandrevold; Fossum IF	19:48.4 (0+1)	Marte Olsbu; Froland IL	19:58.6 (3+0)
10 km pursuit details	Synnøve Solemdal; Tingvoll IL	50:03.1 (0+0+1+3)	Marte Olsbu; Froland IL	51:01.1 (1+0+2+1)	Kaia Wøien Nicolaisen; Asker SK	51:22.5 (2+1+0+0)
12.5 km mass start details	Marte Olsbu; Froland IL	32:41.6 (0+1+0+2)	Synnøve Solemdal; Tingvoll IL	33:09.5 (0+2+3+1)	Marion Rønning Huber; Tynset IF	33:15.8 (0+0+1+1)
3 × 6 km relay details	Hordaland I Ragnhild Femsteinevik; Hilde Fenne; Jori Mørkve	51:41.5; 17:44.6 (0+0); 16:35.3 (0+0); 17:21.6 (0+0)	Oslo og Akershus II; Karoline Næss; Rikke Hald Andersen; Kristin Hjelstuen	52:20.1; 17:18.5 (0+0); 17:26.4 (0+0); 17:35.2 (0+0)	Nord-Østerdal I Eline Grue; Turi Thoresen; Bente Landheim	52:21.5; 18:10.6 (1+0); 17:47.3 (0+0); 16:23.6 (0+0)
