= Kåre Hovda =

Norwegian biathlete (1944–1999)

Medal record

Men's biathlon

Representing Norway

World Championships
Bronze medal – third place	1974 Minsk	4 × 7.5 km relay

Kåre Hovda (24 January 1944 – 13 February 1999) was a Norwegian biathlete. His achievements include a world championship bronze medal, and participation in the Olympics.

== Career ==
Hovda represented Norway at the 1972 Winter Olympics, skiing second leg in the relay, with teammates Tor Svendsberget, Ivar Nordkild and Magnar Solberg, where the Norwegian team placed fourth. He placed 18th at the individual race at the 1972 Winter Olympics. He won a bronze medal in the men's relay at the 1974 Biathlon World Championships, together with his brother Kjell Hovda, Terje Hanssen and Tor Svendsberget.
