= Norwegian Biathlon Championships 1959 =

Biathlon competition in Norway

The 1st Norwegian Biathlon Championships were held in Bærum, Akershus, Norway on 1 February 1959 at the stadium Løvenskioldbanen, arranged by Stor-Oslo Home Guard District 02. There was one scheduled competition: a 20 km individual race for men.

The race was affected by being held very early in the development of biathlon. Unlike the norm of the World Championships, and later the World Cup, the shoots were held at 3.5, 15, 18 and 20 kilometres, respectively. Additionally, each missed shot added two penalty minutes to the athletes' total time.

== Schedule ==
All times are local (UTC+1).

Date	Time	Event
1 February	10:20	Men's 20 km individual

== Medal winners ==
=== Men ===
Event	Gold		Silver		Bronze	
20 km individual	Henry Hermansen; BUL	1:40:40 (7)*	Oddbjørn Skolegården; Home Guard District 05 Våler	1:42:53 (6)	Knut Wold; Home Guard District 05 Elverum	1:44:12 (5)

*This is the amount of misses, not minutes added; double amount of misses for minutes added.
