= Norwegian Biathlon Championships 2015 =

Biathlon competition in Norway

The 57th Norwegian Biathlon Championships were held in Sirdal Municipality in Vest-Agder, Norway from 25 March to 29 March 2015 at the stadium Feed skiarena, arranged by Tonstad IL. There were a total of 8 scheduled competitions: sprint, individual, and relay races for men and women; and a pursuit for the women and a mass start for the men. A pursuit race after the sprint race was scheduled for the men, but that was changed to a mass start race with 60 participants so as to include some of the elite team that had been delayed by the weather and so had been unable to compete in the sprint race. Among these were Emil Hegle Svendsen and Tarjei Bø.

Ole Einar Bjørndalen did not participate in any races due to a cold he had picked up in the last round of the World Cup in Khanty-Mansiysk.

== Schedule ==
All times are local (UTC+1).

Date	Time	Event
25 March	09:30	Women's 15 km individual
25 March	12:15	Men's 20 km individual
27 March	10:15	Women's 7.5 km sprint
27 March	13:00	Men's 10 km sprint
28 March	15:45	Women's 10 km pursuit
28 March	16:45	Men's 15 km mass start
29 March	10:00	Women's 3 × 6 km relay
29 March	12:15	Men's 4 × 7.5 km relay

== Medal winners ==
=== Men ===
Event	Gold		Silver		Bronze	
20 km individual details	Eirik Bratli; Fossum IF	53:47.0 (0+2+0+0)	Kristoffer Langøien Skjelvik; Os IL	54:21.5 (0+0+1+1)	Henrik L'Abée-Lund; Oslo SSL	54:36.3 (1+1+0+1)
10 km sprint details	Bjarte Solvang; Hålandsdal IL	26:04.5 (0+2)	Fredrik Gjesbakk; Bossmo & Ytteren IL	26:07.0 (0+1)	Lars Gunnar Skjevdal; Røros IL	26:23.7 (1+1)
15 km mass start details	Henrik L'Abée-Lund; Oslo SSL	35:01.3 (0+0+0+2)	Tarjei Bø; Markane IL	35:24.4 (0+0+2+0)	Vegard Bjørn Gjermundshaug; Alvdal IL	35:30.7 (1+0+0+1)
4 × 7.5 km relay details	Sør-Trøndelag I Tommy Grøtte; Syver Nygård; Andreas Dahlø Wærnes; Emil Hegle Svendsen	1:14:34.1 (0+1) (0+0) (0+0) (0+0)	Hordaland I Bjarte Mørkve; Thomas Fenne; Bjarte Solvang; Erling Aalvik	1:14:54.0 (0+0) (0+0) (0+1) (0+0)	Oppland I Amund Owren; Sondre Bollum; Vemund Ravnsborg Gurigard; Vetle Ravnsborg Gurigard	1:14:56.1 (0+0) (1+0) (0+0) (0+0)

=== Women ===
Event	Gold		Silver		Bronze	
15 km individual details	Ingrid Landmark Tandrevold; Fossum IF	43:07.6 (1+0+0+1)	Sigrid Bilstad Neraasen; Vingrom IL	43:19.5 (0+0+0+1)	Marte Olsbu; Froland IL	43.43.4 (2+1+1+0)
7.5 km sprint details	Marte Olsbu; Froland IL	20:06.2 (0+1)	Ingrid Landmark Tandrevold; Fossum IF	20:13.4 (0+0)	Astrid Wathne Matthiessen; Fana IL	20:40.1 (0+1)
10 km pursuit details	Marte Olsbu; Froland IL	48:41.1 (2+1+0+2)	Kaia Wøien Nicolaisen; Asker SK	48:49.8 (1+1+2+0)	Ingrid Landmark Tandrevold; Fossum IF	49:03.6 (1+0+2+2)
3 × 6 km relay details	Oslo og Akershus I Rikke Hald Andersen; Sofie Rostad; Kaia Wøien Nicolaisen	46:03.4 (0+0) (0+0) (0+0)	Oppland I Hanne Tingelstad; Karoline Knotten; Sigrid Bilstad Neraasen	47:47.0 (0+0) (1+0) (0+0)	Nord-Trøndelag I Ane Skrove Nossum; Tonje Marie Skjelstadås; Lotte Lie	48:06.8 (0+0) (0+0) (0+0)
