= Øivind Nerhagen =

Norwegian biathlete

Personal information
- Full name: Øivind Nerhagen
- Born: 21 April 1958 (age 68) Trysil, Hedmark, Norway

Sport

Professional information
- Sport: Biathlon
- Club: Trysilgutten IL
- World Cup debut: 14 January 1982

World Championships
- Teams: 4 (1983, 1985, 1986, 1987)
- Medals: 1 (0 gold)

World Cup
- Seasons: 6 (1981/82–1986/87)
- All victories: 0
- All podiums: 0
Medal record
Men's biathlon
Representing Norway
World Championships
| Bronze medal – third place | 1983 Antholz-Anterselva | 4 × 7.5 km relay |
Norwegian Championships
| Gold medal – first place | 1985 Fyresdal | 4 × 7.5 km relay |
| Gold medal – first place | 1984 Vossestrand | 4 × 7.5 km relay |
| Gold medal – first place | 1983 Lygna | 4 × 7.5 km relay |
| Silver medal – second place | 1987 Tromsø | 20 km individual |
| Silver medal – second place | 1987 Tromsø | 4 × 7.5 km relay |
| Silver medal – second place | 1986 Geilo | 10 km sprint |
| Silver medal – second place | 1985 Fyresdal | 20 km individual |
| Silver medal – second place | 1982 Steinkjer | 4 × 7.5 km relay |
| Bronze medal – third place | 1988 Dombås | 4 × 7.5 km relay |
| Bronze medal – third place | 1986 Geilo | 4 × 7.5 km relay |
| Bronze medal – third place | 1984 Vossestrand | 10 km sprint |
| Bronze medal – third place | 1983 Lygna | 20 km individual |
| Bronze medal – third place | 1983 Lygna | 10 km sprint |

Øivind Nerhagen (born 21 April 1958) is a former Norwegian biathlete.

== Life and career ==
Born in Trysil Municipality in the eastern part of Norway, Nerhagen is an educated agronomist.

Nerhagen debuted at the World Championship-level at the World Championships in Antholz-Anterselva in 1983. He also participated in the World Championships in 1985, 1986 and 1987 for Norway. His best individual finish at the World Championships came in 1985 in Ruhpolding where Nerhagen finished 15th in the 20 km individual. His best relay finish at the World Championships was a bronze which came in his first in 1983, which also would be his only medal at the World Championships.

In the World Cup, Nerhagen debuted in the first round of the 1981–82 World Cup in Egg am Etzel in Switzerland. Over his career he never finished on the podium individually, but he did finish in the top ten in multiple other races. Nerhagen did, however, come on the podium in the relay several times, once at the very top in the second round of the 1983–84 World Cup in Pontresina, Switzerland, though all came before the relays became official in the 1986–87 World Cup. After that, his best relay finish was a 4th in Antholz-Anterselva during the 1986–87 season. Nerhagen's best overall finish came in the 1983–84 World Cup where he finished 18th.

Ahead of the 1987–88 season, Nerhagen was not reselected for the Norwegian national biathlon team, and after that, he never again raced in the World Cup.

At home, Nerhagen won 13 medals at the Norwegian Biathlon Championships, of which three were gold.

== Biathlon results ==
All results are sourced from the International Biathlon Union.

=== World Championships ===
1 medal (1 bronze)

| Event | Individual | Sprint | Relay |
|---|---|---|---|
| (Italy) 1983 Antholz-Anterselva | 29th | — | Bronze |
| (West Germany) 1985 Ruhpolding | 15th | — | — |
| (Norway) 1986 Oslo Holmenkollen | 28th | 34th | 5th |
| (United States) 1987 Lake Placid | 32nd | — | 4th |

*During Olympic seasons competitions are only held for those events not included in the Olympic program.
