= Tynset IF =

Norwegian sports club

- Full name: Tynset Idrettsforening
- Founded: 15 September 1900; 126 years ago
- Ground: Nytrømoen, Tynset Municipality
- League: 3. divisjon
- 2019: 4. divisjon Group 20, 1st of 12; (promoted)
Home colours

Tynset Idrettsforening is a Norwegian sports club from Tynset Municipality in Innlandet county. It has sections for association football, team handball, cycling, judo, orienteering, speed skating, skiing, swimming, and taekwondo.

It was established on 15 September 1900 as Tønset IF, and the name was modernized to Tynset IF in 1923 at the same time as the club adopted association football.

The men's football team currently plays in the 3. divisjon, the fourth tier of the Norwegian football league system. It last played in the 2. divisjon in 1999.

Skiers include Tor Halvor Bjørnstad, Therese Johaug and Annar Ryen.
