= Terje Hanssen =

Norwegian biathlete

Medal record

Men's biathlon

Representing Norway

World Championships
Bronze medal – third place	1974 Minsk	4 × 7.5 km relay

Terje Hanssen (born 20 September 1948 in Kabelvåg, Lofoten) is a former Norwegian biathlete. At the 1976 Winter Olympics in Innsbruck, he finished fifth with the Norwegian relay team. He won a bronze medal in the relay at the 1974 Biathlon World Championships, together with Kjell Hovda, Kåre Hovda and Tor Svendsberget.
