= Per Nilsen =

Swedish professor and biographer

Per Nilsen (born April 8, 1960) is a Swedish professor and author. He grew up in Täby, north of Stockholm. Nilsen graduated in economics at the Stockholm School of Economics in 1985. He has written substantially within the field of Implementation science as an academic and has written several music biographies, including several books focusing on David Bowie, Prince and Iggy Pop and The Stooges. In 1991, Nilsen together with Lars Einarsson created Uptown, a professionally designed international journal devoted to exploring Prince's music. They published Uptown for 12 years. The journal was praised for its insightful analysis and independence. However, in 1999 Prince and his management filed a suit against the journal, seeking to halt its publication since they could not control the content. Enlisting the help of a lawyer (longtime Uptown reader Alex Hahn), the journal successfully defended the case and the lawsuit was subsequently dropped.

Nilsen studied systems development at Linköping University in 2001–2002, which led to a career as a researcher. He became a doctoral student in 2003 at the medical faculty at Linköping University and in 2006 he defended his PhD thesis on injury prevention work, whereupon he received the title of Doctor of Medicine. He became associate professor in 2008 and professor in 2014 in social medicine and public health sciences. Since 2022 he is also a professor in implementation science at Halmstad University.

The scope of Nilsen's research is broad, but since 2010 has had a focus on implementation science, with issues concerning the uptake and use of research and evidence in healthcare and in society at large. In 2015, Nilsen conducted a systematic review of the theories and methods underlying the practice of implementation science; his methods were later adopted by OECD researchers seeking to apply implementation science to the field of education. He is a prolific researcher with over 200 peer-reviewed articles and several books in Swedish and English in this field. He also teaches doctoral students a course in scientific writing. Nilsen has many national and international collaborations and often speaks at conferences and courses. He has assignments for the Swedish Research Council (Vetenskapsrådet), Sweden's largest government research financier, and is a board member of the Swedish Research Council for Health, Working Life and Welfare (Forte)

== Selected works ==
- Nilsen, Per (1985). People Stared at the Make-Up on His face - David Bowie - a Concert Documentary. ASIN B000KF3G2E.
- Nilsen, Per; Sherman, Dorothy (1987). The Wild One: The True Story of Iggy Pop. Omnibus Press. ISBN 9780711913936.
- Nilsen, Per (1990). Prince: A Documentary. Omnibus Press. ISBN 9780711931794.
- Nilsen, Per (1999). Dance Music Sex Romance: Prince, the First Decade. Firefly. ISBN 9780946719235.
- Nilsen, Per (2006). Opening the Black Box of Community-Based Injury Prevention Programmes: Towards Improved Understanding of Factors that Influence Programme Effectiveness (Ph.D. thesis). Institutionen för hälsa och samhälle.
- Nilsen, Per (2015). "Making sense of implementation theories, models and frameworks". Implementation Science. 10 (53). BioMed Central: 53. doi:10.1186/s13012-015-0242-0. PMC 4406164. PMID 25895742.
- Nilsen, Per; Birken, Sarah A., eds. (2020). Handbook on Implementation Science. Edward Elgar Publishing. ISBN 9781788975988.
- Nilsen, Per (2021). Iggy and The Stooges On Stage 1967 to 1974. Sonicbond Press. ISBN 9781789521016.
