= Tor Halvor Bjørnstad =

Norwegian cross-country skier and biathlete

Personal information
- Nationality: Norway

Sport
- Sport: Skiing
- Club: Tynset IF

World Cup career
- Seasons: 3 – (2002, 2006, 2008)
- Indiv. starts: 3
- Indiv. podiums: 0
- Team starts: 0
- Overall titles: 0 – (139th in 2002)
- Discipline titles: 0

Tor Halvor Bjørnstad is a retired Norwegian cross-country skier, biathlete and winter triathlete.

== Career ==
He made his World Cup debut in March 2002 in Holmenkollen, with a 30th place in the 50 km race. In the same race in 2006 he finished 28th, and in the same race in 2008 he finished 27th.

He formerly represented the sports club Bækkelagets SK, Tynset IF, while also residing in Tynset.

== Cross-country skiing results ==
All results are sourced from the International Ski Federation (FIS).

=== World Cup ===
==== Season standings ====
Season	Age	Discipline standings			Ski Tour standings	
Season	Age	Overall	Distance	Sprint	Tour de Ski	World Cup Final
2002	23	139	—N/a	—	—N/a	—N/a
2006	27	172	125	—	—N/a	—N/a
2008	29	152	90	—	—	—
