= Svein Engen =

Norwegian biathlete (born 1953)

Personal information
- Born: 27 March 1953 (age 73) Hønefoss, Norway

Sport

Professional information
- Sport: Biathlon

Olympic Games
- Teams: 2 (1976, 1980)

Svein Engen (born 27 March 1953, in Hønefoss) is a former Norwegian biathlete. He competed at the 1976 Winter Olympics in Innsbruck and at the 1980 Winter Olympics in Lake Placid.

He won five Norwegian biathlon championships. These include victories in 10 km (sprint) in 1977, and in 20 km (the normal distance) in 1977, 1978, and 1983.
