= Rune Brattsveen =

Norwegian biathlete

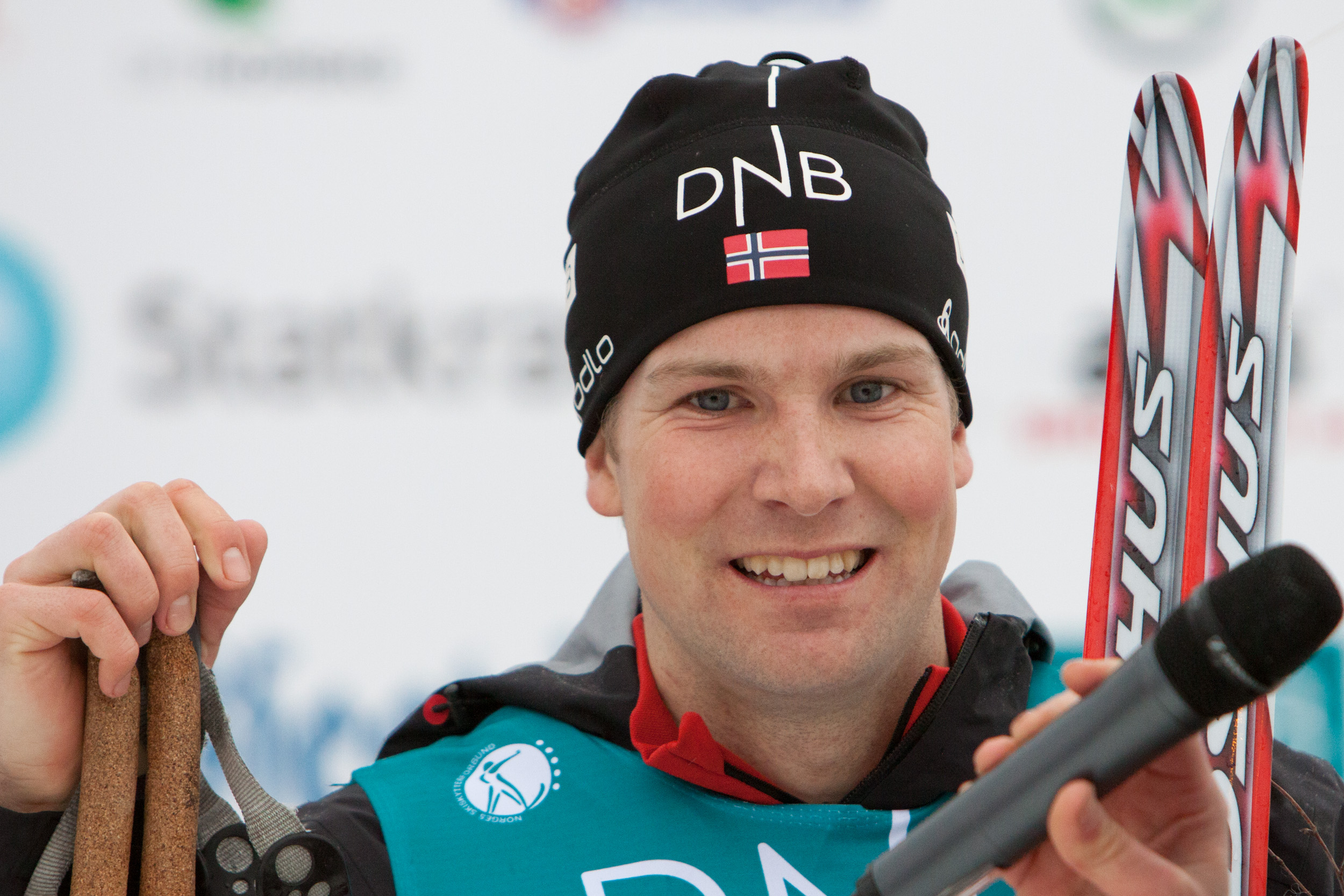
- Brattsveen at the Norwegian Championships in 2012.

Personal information
- Full name: Rune Brattsveen
- Born: 5 April 1984 (age 42) Dokka, Nordre Land Municipality, Oppland, Norway

Sport

Professional information
- Sport: Biathlon
- Club: Nordre Land IL
- Skis: Madshus
- Rifle: Anschütz
- World Cup debut: 29 November 2007
- Retired: 27 March 2014

World Championships
- Teams: 2 (2008, 2012)
- Medals: 2 (1 gold)

World Cup
- Seasons: 5 (2007/08–2011/12)
- Individual victories: 0
- All victories: 3
- Individual podiums: 0
- All podiums: 6
Medal record
Men's biathlon
Representing Norway
World Championships
Gold medal – first place	2012 Ruhpolding	4 × 7.5 km relay
Silver medal – second place	2008 Östersund	4 × 7.5 km relay

Rune Brattsveen (born 5 April 1984) is a former Norwegian biathlete.

== Life and career ==
Brattsveen was born in Dokka in Nordre Land Municipality to mother Jorun, a librarian, and father Bjørn. He has one older sister Hege (born 1980). He went to school in Dokka for ten years, before he started at Norges toppidrettsgymnas in Lillehammer at the age of 16. He currently resides in Lillehammer.

Brattsveen has many good placings in the Biathlon World Cup. He was a member of the Norwegian elite biathlon team from the 2008–09 season to the 2009–10 season, and again in the 2012–13 season. He did not, however, have any World Cup starts in the 2012–13 season because of the TWAR virus. Further illness meant no starts in the 2013–14 season either, and after that season Brattsveen decided to retire.

== Distinctions ==
=== National distinctions ===
- 2001 – Sverre Kolteruds idrettspris – local and significant sport talents in Nordre Land
- 2008 – Sverre Kolteruds idrettspris
- 2012 – Oppland Arbeiderblads idrettspris – awarded local talents within sports
