= Gry Østvik =

Norwegian biathlete (born 1963)

Medal record

Women's biathlon

Representing Norway

World Championships
Silver medal – second place	1984 Chamonix	3 × 5 km relay
Silver medal – second place	1985 Egg am Etzl	3 × 5 km relay

Gry Østvik (born 14 August 1963) is a former Norwegian biathlete and the first overall world cup winner for women.

== World championships ==
She participated in the Norwegian team that won silver in the 3 × 5 km relay in 1984 and 1985.

== World cup ==
Østvik won the overall Biathlon World Cup in the 1982/83 season. She finished 3rd in 1983/84.
