= Skonseng =

Village in Rana Municipality, Norway

- Village
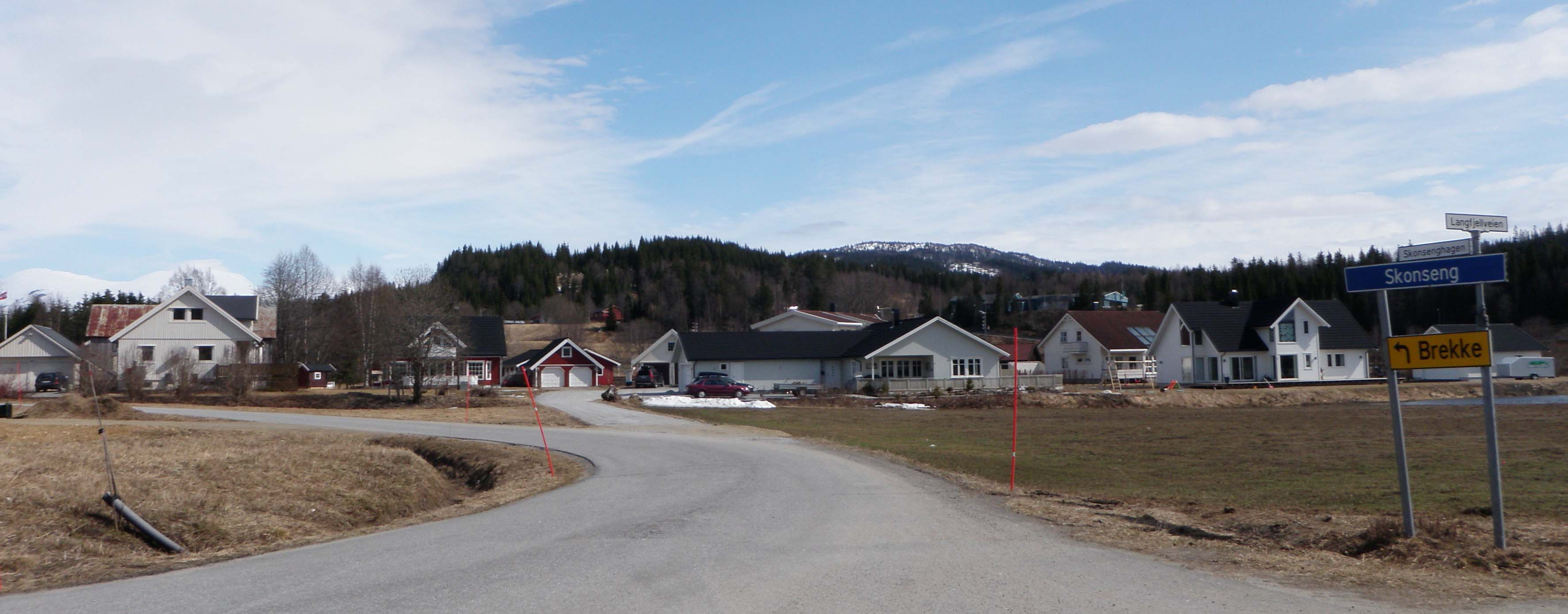
- View of the village
- Interactive map of Skonseng
- Location within Nordland Location within Norway
- Coordinates: 66.3561°N 14.3381°E
- Country: Norway
- Region: Northern Norway
- County: Nordland
- District: Helgeland
- Municipality: Rana Municipality
- Elevation: 52 m (171 ft)
- Time zone: UTC+01:00 (CET)
  - Summer (DST): UTC+02:00 (CEST)
- Post Code: 8615 Skonseng

Skonseng is a village in Rana Municipality in Nordland county, Norway. The village is located about 10 kilometres (6.2 mi) northeast of the town of Mo i Rana in an agricultural area with a population of about 1,000. The village is located along the south side of the river Ranelva where three valleys meet each other: the Dunderland Valley, Plurdal, and Rødvassdal. The village of Røssvoll lies on the north side of the river, just across from Skonseng. The Nordland Line passes through the village.

Skonseng has several sports arena: Biathlon, cross country skiing, ski jump, beach volleyball, and soccer.
