= Mette Mestad =

Norwegian biathlete

Personal information
- Nationality: Norwegian
- Born: 19 November 1958

Sport
- Country: Norway
- Sport: Biathlon

Mette Mestad (born 19 November 1958) is a former Norwegian biathlete and winner of the second overall world cup for women. She won the overall Biathlon World Cup in the 1983/84 season. She became Norwegian champion seven times.
