= Austmarka =

Village in Alver Municipality, Norway

- Village
- Interactive map of Austmarka
- Coordinates: 60.61866°N 5.18074°E
- Country: Norway
- Region: Western Norway
- County: Vestland
- District: Nordhordland
- Municipality: Alver Municipality

Area
  - Total: 0.25 km^{2} (0.097 sq mi)
- Elevation: 35 m (115 ft)

Population (2025)
  - Total: 464
  - Density: 1,856/km^{2} (4,810/sq mi)
- Time zone: UTC+01:00 (CET)
  - Summer (DST): UTC+02:00 (CEST)
- Post Code: 5938 Sæbøvågen

Austmarka is a village in Alver Municipality in Vestland county, Norway. The village is located on the southern end of the island of Radøy, about 2 kilometres (1.2 mi) east of the village of Sæbø and about 5 kilometres (3.1 mi) north of the village of Alverstraumen.

Prior to 2020, the village was part of Radøy Municipality.

The 0.25-square-kilometre (62-acre) village has a population (2025) of 464 and a population density of 1,856 inhabitants per square kilometre (4,810/sq mi).
