= Trude Harstad =

Norwegian biathlete

Personal information
- Full name: Trude Harstad
- Born: 17 July 1974 (age 52) Birkenes Municipality, Aust-Agder, Norway

Sport

Professional information
- Sport: Biathlon
- Club: Birkenes IL
- World Cup debut: 13 March 1993

World Cup
- Seasons: 3 (1992/93, 1996/97–1997/98)
- All races: 6
- All podiums: 0
Medal record
Women's biathlon
Representing Norway
Norwegian Championships
Gold medal – first place	1997 Savalen	Team event
Gold medal – first place	1996 Brumunddal	Team event
Silver medal – second place	1997 Savalen	3 × 7.5 km relay
Silver medal – second place	1996 Brumunddal	3 × 7.5 km relay
Bronze medal – third place	1994 Trondheim	3 × 7.5 km relay
Bronze medal – third place	1990 Dombås	Team event
Junior World Championships
Gold medal – first place	1994 Brezno-Osrblie	Team event
Bronze medal – third place	1994 Brezno-Osrblie	3 × 7.5 km relay
Junior Norwegian Championships
Gold medal – first place	1993 Ål	7.5 km sprint
Gold medal – first place	1992 Meldal	10 km individual
Gold medal – first place	1992 Meldal	7.5 km sprint
Gold medal – first place	1992 Meldal	3 × 7.5 km relay
Silver medal – second place	1994 Markane	10 km individual
Bronze medal – third place	1994 Markane	3 × 7.5 km relay
Bronze medal – third place	1991 Tana	3 × 7.5 km relay

Trude Harstad (born 17 July 1974) is a former Norwegian biathlete.

== Life and career ==
Harstad was born in Birkenes Municipality in the southern part of Norway.

Harstad debuted at the Junior World Championships in 1993 in Ruhpolding. The first event was the team event, which was not a success, as the Norwegian team composed of Harstad, Gunn Margit Andreassen and Liv Grete Skjelbreid came 9th. She did not race in the 10 km individual, but came 15th in the 7.5 km sprint. She was not a part of the relay team, which won gold. The following year in Brezno-Osrblie, Harstad won gold in the team event, alongside Karianne Væting, Liv Grete Skjelbreid and Eli Merete Melheim. She faltered in the individual events, finishing 16th in the 10 km individual and seventh, best of the Norwegians, in the sprint. Harstad finished with a bronze in the relay, having taken the anchor leg and racing with Liv Grete Skjelbreid and Karianne Væting.

In the World Cup, Harstad debuted in the fifth round of the 1992–93 World Cup in Östersund in Sweden. She finished 55th and did not return to the World Cup until the 1996–97 season. Harstad did not catch on and she only had a total of six starts in the World Cup, the best of which was two 53rds in Lillehammer in 1996–97. As she did not score any World Cup points, she did not have any overall placement in the total score of the World Cup.

At home, Harstad was more successful. She won 6 medals at the Norwegian Biathlon Championships, two of which were gold. Additionally, Harstad won 7 medals at the Junior Norwegian Biathlon Championships, of which four were gold.

== Biathlon results ==
=== Junior World Championships ===
2 medals (1 gold, 1 bronze)

Event	Individual	Sprint	Team	Relay
(Germany) 1993 Ruhpolding	—	15th	9th	—
(Slovakia) 1994 Brezno-Osrblie	16th	7th	Gold	Bronze
