= Esten Gjelten =

Norwegian biathlete

Personal information
- Nationality: Norwegian
- Born: 27 September 1942
- Died: 15 March 2025 (aged 82)

Sport
- Sport: Biathlon
Medal record
Men's biathlon
Representing Norway
World Championships
| Silver medal – second place | 1973 Lake Placid | 4 × 7.5 km relay |
| Silver medal – second place | 1970 Östersund | 4 × 7.5 km relay |
| Silver medal – second place | 1969 Zakopane | 4 × 7.5 km relay |

Esten Gjelten (27 September 1942 — 15 March 2025) was a Norwegian biathlete.

He participated on the Norwegian team that received silver medals in the 4 × 7.5 km relay in the Biathlon World Championships in 1969, 1970 and 1973.

At the Biathlon World Championships 1973 in Lake Placid he won a silver medal in the relay along with team mates Kjell Hovda, Ragnar Tveiten and Tor Svendsberget, and he placed fifth in the individual competition.
