= Ivar Michal Ulekleiv =

Norwegian biathlete

Personal information
- Full name: Ivar Michal Ulekleiv
- Born: 22 May 1966 (age 60) Dombås, Oppland, Norway
- Height: 1.80 m (5 ft 11 in)

Sport

Professional information
- Sport: Biathlon
- Club: Dovre Skiskytterlag
- World Cup debut: 26 January 1989

Olympic Games
- Teams: 1 (1994)
- Medals: 0

World Championships
- Teams: 3 (1989, 1991, 1993)
- Medals: 1 (0 gold)

World Cup
- Seasons: 7 (1988/89–1994/95)
- Individual victories: 0
- Individual podiums: 0
Medal record
Men's biathlon
Representing Norway
World Championships
Silver medal – second place	1991 Lahti	Team event

Ivar Michal Ulekleiv (born 22 May 1966) is a former Norwegian biathlete. He was born in Dombås, and represented the club Dovre Skiskytterlag. He competed at the 1994 Winter Olympics in Lillehammer.

He won a silver medal in the team event at the Biathlon World Championships 1991, together with Sverre Istad, Jon Åge Tyldum and Frode Løberg.

== Biathlon results ==
All results are sourced from the International Biathlon Union.

=== Olympic Games ===
Event	Individual	Sprint	Relay
(Norway) 1994 Lillehammer	—	14th	7th

=== World Championships ===
1 medal (1 silver)

Event	Individual	Sprint	Team	Relay
(Austria) 1989 Feistritz	—	—	11th	—
(Finland) 1991 Lahti	—	—	Silver	—
(Bulgaria) 1993 Borovets	—	21st	12th	—

*During Olympic seasons competitions are only held for those events not included in the Olympic program.
