= Elin Kristiansen =

Norwegian biathlete (born 1968)

Medal record

Women's biathlon

Representing Norway

World Championships
Gold medal – first place	1995 Antholz-Anterselva	Team event
Silver medal – second place	1988 Chamonix	10 km individual
Silver medal – second place	1988 Chamonix	3 × 5 km relay
Silver medal – second place	1989 Feistritz an der Drau	Team event
Silver medal – second place	1990 Oslo	3 × 5 km relay
Silver medal – second place	1991 Lahti	3 × 5 km relay
Bronze medal – third place	1990 Oslo	7.5 km sprint

Elin Kristiansen (born 9 July 1968) is a former biathlete from Norway. She won two individual World Championships medals, one in 1988 when she won silver at the 10 km event and a bronze in 1990 from the sprint event. Her best Winter Olympic Games placing came in the 1994 Winter Olympics, when she finished fourth in the relay event, and her best individual placing was ninth, from the individual at the Olympic games 1992 in Albertville.
