= Unni Kristiansen =

Norwegian biathlete

Sport
- Sport: Biathlon
Medal record
Representing Norway
Biathlon World Championships
Bronze medal – third place	1991 Lahti	Team

Unni Kristiansen is a Norwegian former biathlete. She won a bronze medal in the team event at the Biathlon World Championships 1991, together with Synnøve Thoresen, Signe Trosten and Hildegunn Fossen.
