= Kjell Hovda =

Norwegian biathlete (born 1945)

Personal information
- Born: 27 October 1945 (age 80) Veggli, Norway

Sport
- Sport: Biathlon
Medal record
Men's biathlon
Representing Norway
World Championships
Silver medal – second place	1973 Lake Placid	4 × 7.5 km relay
Bronze medal – third place	1974 Minsk	4 × 7.5 km relay

Kjell Hovda (born 27 October 1945) is a Norwegian former biathlete. His achievements include winning silver and bronze medals in relays at the Biathlon World Championships.

== Career ==
Born in Veggli on 27 October 1945, Hovda participated on the Norwegian team that won silver medals in 4 × 7.5 km relay in the Biathlon World Championships 1973 in Lake Placid, along with team mates Esten Gjelten, Ragnar Tveiten and Tor Svendsberget, and he placed 9th in the individual competition.

He won a bronze medal in the relay in the 1974 World Championships in Minsk, and participated in the 1976 Winter Olympics.

Hovda coached the Norwegian national team 1976–80, has also been an expert commentator for NRK.
