= Åse Idland =

Norwegian biathlete

Medal record

Women's biathlon

Representing Norway

World Championships
Silver medal – second place	1994 Canmore	Team event

European Championships
Bronze medal – third place	1999 Izhevsk	4 × 6 km relay

Åse Idland (born 2 April 1973 in Stavanger) is a retired Norwegian biathlete.

She competed in biathlon at the 1992 Winter Olympics in the women's individual event.

== Career ==
- World Championships
  - 1994 Canmore - Silver medal in the team competition
