= Geir Einang =

Norwegian biathlete

Personal information
- Born: 8 March 1965 (age 61) Årdal Municipality, Norway

Sport

Professional information
- Sport: Biathlon

World Championships
- Medals: 2
Medal record
Men's biathlon
Representing Norway
World Championships
Bronze medal – third place	1989 Feistritz an der Drau	4 × 7.5 km relay
Bronze medal – third place	1991 Lahti	4 × 7.5 km relay

Geir Einang (born March 8, 1965, in Årdal Municipality in Sogn og Fjordane) is a former Norwegian biathlete. He participated in the Norwegian team that received bronze medals in the 4 × 7.5 km relay in the Biathlon World Championships in Feistritz an der Drau in 1989, and in Lahti in 1991.
