= Sylfest Glimsdal =

Norwegian biathlete (born 1966)

Personal information
- Full name: Sylfest Glimsdal
- Born: 9 October 1966 (age 59) Fagernes, Oppland, Norway
- Height: 1.80 m (5 ft 11 in)

Sport

Professional information
- Sport: Biathlon
- Club: Nord-Aurdal SSL
- World Cup debut: 23 January 1988

Olympic Games
- Teams: 3 (1988, 1992, 1994)
- Medals: 0

World Championships
- Teams: 8 (1989, 1992, 1993, 1994, 1995, 1997, 1998, 1999)
- Medals: 3 (1 gold)

World Cup
- Seasons: 13 (1987/88–1999/2000)
- Individual victories: 3
- Individual podiums: 7
- Discipline titles: 1: 1 Sprint (1991–92)
Medal record
Men's biathlon
Representing Norway
World Championships
Gold medal – first place	1998 Hochfilzen	Team event
Silver medal – second place	1992 Novosibirsk	Team event
Bronze medal – third place	1989 Feistritz	4 × 7.5 km relay

Sylfest Glimsdal (born 9 October 1966) is a former Norwegian biathlete. In the 1991–92 season, Glimsdal came third in the overall World Cup standings, behind Jon Åge Tyldum and Mikael Löfgren. During his career he won one gold, one silver and one bronze medal at World Championships. In 2000, he ended his career as a biathlete.

== Biathlon results ==
All results are sourced from the International Biathlon Union.

=== Olympic Games ===
Event	Individual	Sprint	Relay
(Canada) 1988 Calgary	39th	—	—
(France) 1992 Albertville	—	24th	—
(Norway) 1994 Lillehammer	9th	53rd	—

=== World Championships ===
3 medals (1 gold, 1 silver, 1 bronze)

Event	Individual	Sprint	Pursuit	Mass start	Team	Relay
(Austria) 1989 Feistritz	—	6th	—N/a	—N/a	11th	Bronze
(Russia) 1992 Novosibirsk	—N/a	—N/a	—N/a	—N/a	Silver	—N/a
(Bulgaria) 1993 Borovets	56th	13th	—N/a	—N/a	12th	9th
(Canada) 1994 Canmore	—N/a	—N/a	—N/a	—N/a	4th	—N/a
(Italy) 1995 Antholz-Anterselva	9th	68th	—N/a	—N/a	—	—
(Slovakia) 1997 Brezno-Osrblie	—	69th	—	—N/a	—	—
(Slovenia) 1998 Pokljuka	—N/a	—N/a	—	—N/a	Gold	—N/a
(Finland) 1999 Kontiolahti	17th	17th	30th	13th	—N/a	—

*During Olympic seasons competitions are only held for those events not included in the Olympic program.
**Team was removed as an event in 1998, and pursuit was added in 1997 with mass start being added in 1999.

=== Individual victories ===
3 victories (1 In, 2 Sp)

Season	Date	Location	Discipline	Level
1993–94; 1 victory (1 Sp)	19 March 1994	(Canada) Canmore	10 km sprint	Biathlon World Cup
1994–95; 1 victory (1 Sp)	16 December 1994	(Austria) Bad Gastein	10 km sprint	Biathlon World Cup
1997–98; 1 victory (1 In)	11 December 1997	(Sweden) Östersund	20 km individual	Biathlon World Cup

*Results are from UIPMB and IBU races which include the Biathlon World Cup, Biathlon World Championships and the Winter Olympic Games.
