= Terje Breivik =

Norwegian politician and entrepreneur

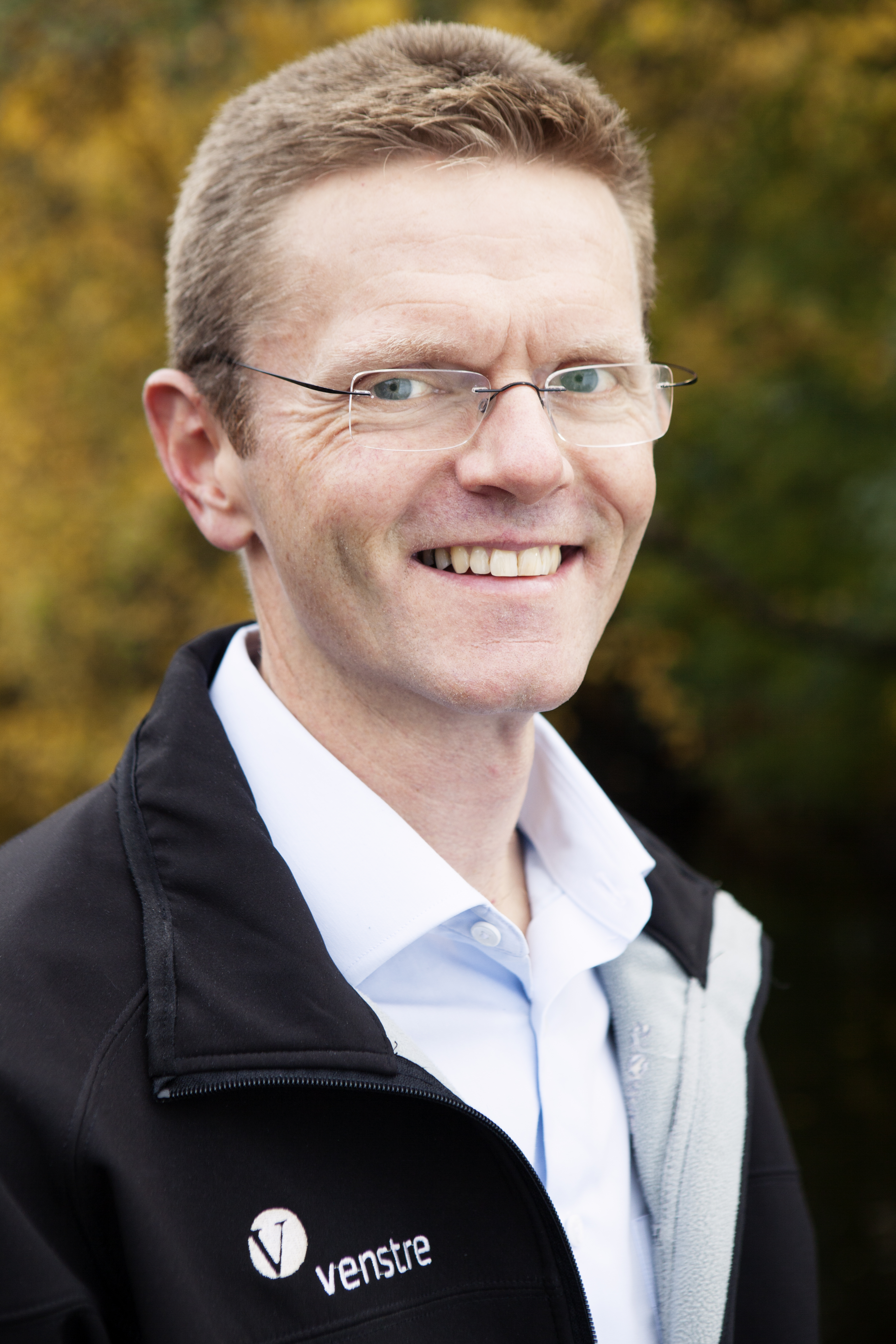
- Breivik in 2009

Member of the Norwegian Parliament
- Incumbent
- Assumed office 1 October 2013
- Constituency: Hordaland

Second Deputy Leader of the Liberal Party
- In office 14 April 2012 – 26 September 2020
- Leader: Trine Skei Grande
- Preceded by: Ola Elvestuen
- Succeeded by: Abid Raja

Parliamentary Leader of the Liberal Party
- Incumbent
- Assumed office 18 January 2018
- Leader: Trine Skei Grande
- Preceded by: Trine Skei Grande

Secretary General of the Liberal Party
- In office 1 July 2004 – 14 April 2012
- Leader: Lars Sponheim; Trine Skei Grande
- Preceded by: Geir Rune Nyhus
- Succeeded by: Trond Enger

Personal details
- Born: 24 March 1965 (age 60) Ulvik, Norway
- Party: Liberal

Terje Breivik (born 24 March 1965) is a Norwegian politician and entrepreneur. He served as the second deputy leader of the Liberal party from 2012 to 2020. He is the former mayor of Ulvik Municipality. Prior to becoming deputy leader in 2012, he served in the capacity as secretary-general of the Liberal Party since 2004.

He was elected to the position after the former deputy leader Helge Solum Larsen was indicted on rape charges against a youth party member.
