= Jori Mørkve =

Norwegian biathlete (born 1980)

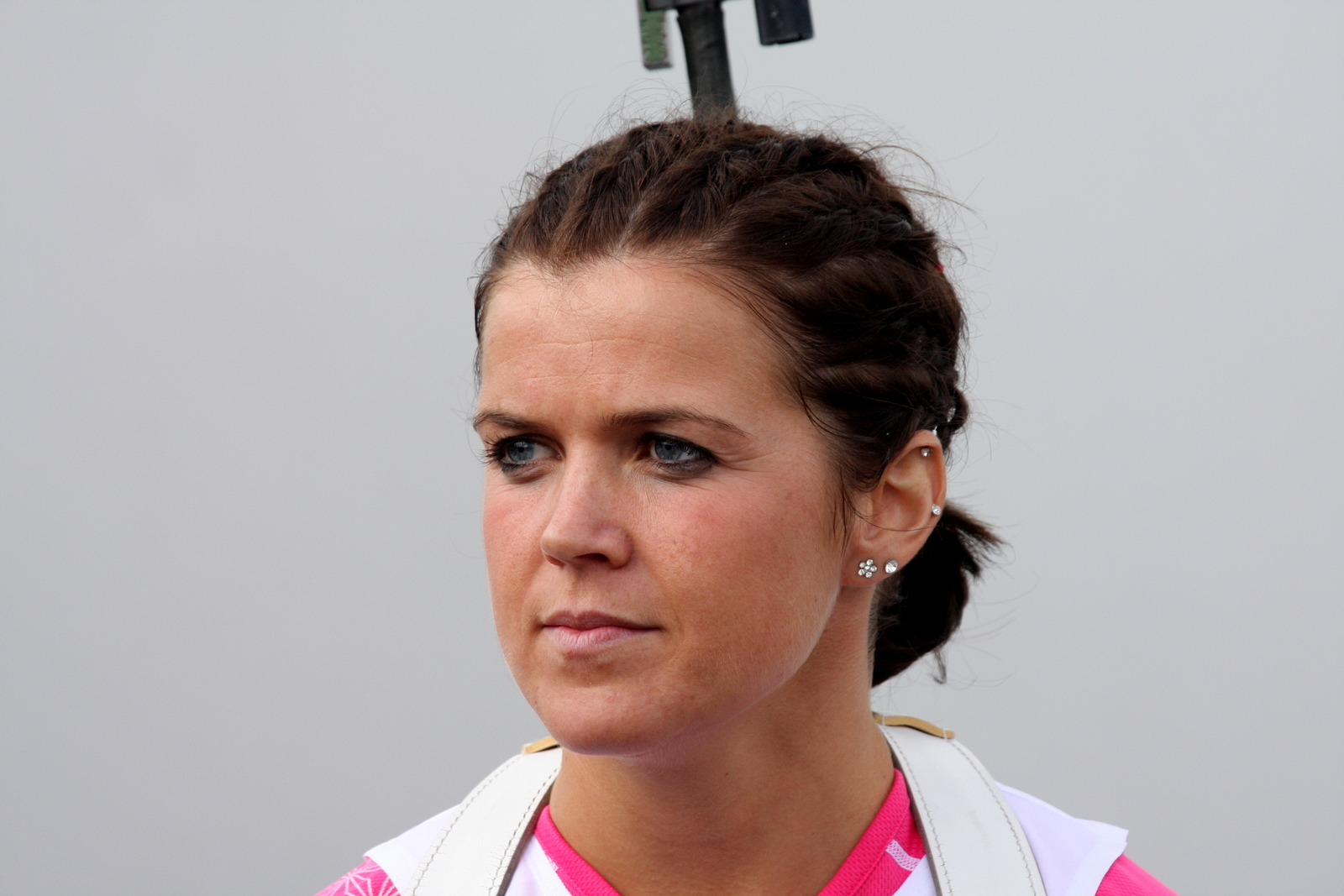
- Mørkve at the Blink Festival in 2009

Personal information
- Full name: Jori Mørkve
- Born: 29 December 1980 (age 45) Voss Municipality, Hordaland, Norway
- Height: 1.72 m (5 ft 8 in)

Sport

Professional information
- Sport: Biathlon
- Club: Eldar IL
- World Cup debut: 5 January 2001
- Retired: 3 April 2016

Olympic Games
- Teams: 0
- Medals: 0 (0 gold)

World Championships
- Teams: 3 (2006, 2007, 2011)
- Medals: 2 (0 gold)

World Cup
- Seasons: 10 (2000/01, 2004/05–2008/09, 2010/11–2012/13, 2015/16)
- Individual victories: 0
- All victories: 0
- Individual podiums: 0
- All podiums: 3
Medal record
Women's biathlon
Representing Norway
World Championships
| Bronze medal – third place | 2007 Antholz-Anterselva | 4 × 6 km relay |
| Bronze medal – third place | 2007 Antholz-Anterselva | Mixed relay |

Jori Mørkve (born 29 December 1980) is a Norwegian former biathlete.

== Career ==
Mørkve debuted in the World Cup in 2001 in Oberhof with a 77th-place finish. In 2005, she came in 49th in the 15 km in Antholz-Anterselva. Her best achievement in the world cup was a third place with the Norwegian relay team from Hochfilzen in the season of 2006–07. She was named to the Norwegian team in the mixed relay at the World Championship 2007 in Antholz-Anterselva. Together with Tora Berger, Emil Hegle Svendsen and Frode Andresen, the Norwegian mixed relay team earned a bronze medal. She also won a bronze medal with the Norwegian team in the 4 × 6 km relay together with Tora Berger, Ann Kristin Flatland and Linda Grubben.

Mørkve retired after the 2015–16 season.

== Biathlon results ==
All results are sourced from the International Biathlon Union.

=== World Championships ===
2 medals (2 bronze)

| Event | Individual | Sprint | Pursuit | Mass start | Relay | Mixed relay |
|---|---|---|---|---|---|---|
| (Slovenia) 2006 Pokljuka | —N/a | —N/a | —N/a | —N/a | —N/a | 23rd |
| (Italy) 2007 Antholz-Anterselva | — | — | — | — | Bronze | Bronze |
| (Russia) 2011 Khanty-Mansiysk | 78th | — | — | — | — | — |

*During Olympic seasons competitions are only held for those events not included in the Olympic program.

=== World Cup ===
| Season | Overall | | Individual | | Sprint | | Pursuit | | Mass start | |
| Season | Points | Position | Points | Position | Points | Position | Points | Position | Points | Position |
|---|---|---|---|---|---|---|---|---|---|---|
| 2000–01 | 0 | —N/a | 0 | —N/a | 0 | —N/a | 0 | —N/a | 0 | —N/a |
| 2004–05 | 0 | —N/a | 0 | —N/a | 0 | —N/a | 0 | —N/a | 0 | —N/a |
| 2005–06 | 0 | —N/a | 0 | —N/a | 0 | —N/a | 0 | —N/a | 0 | —N/a |
| 2006–07 | 39 | 57th | 7 | 52nd | 23 | 49th | 9 | 54th | 0 | —N/a |
| 2007–08 | 0 | —N/a | 0 | —N/a | 0 | —N/a | 0 | —N/a | 0 | —N/a |
| 2008–09 | 0 | —N/a | 0 | —N/a | 0 | —N/a | 0 | —N/a | 0 | —N/a |
| 2010–11 | 0 | —N/a | 0 | —N/a | 0 | —N/a | 0 | —N/a | 0 | —N/a |
| 2011–12 | 15 | 77th | 15 | 50th | 0 | —N/a | 0 | —N/a | 0 | —N/a |
| 2012–13 | 0 | —N/a | 0 | —N/a | 0 | —N/a | 0 | —N/a | 0 | —N/a |
| 2015–16 | 0 | —N/a | 0 | —N/a | 0 | —N/a | 0 | —N/a | 0 | —N/a |
