= Signe Trosten =

Norwegian biathlete

Medal record

Representing Norway

Women's biathlon

World championship
| Bronze medal – third place | 1991 Lahti | Team |

Signe Trosten (born 30 March 1970, in Tana Municipality) is a former Norwegian biathlete. She participated on the Norwegian team that received a bronze medal in team race in the 1991 Biathlon World Championships in Lahti. She also participated in Novosibirsk in the 1992 world championships, where the team finished 5th. She competed at the 1992 Winter Olympics in Albertville where her team finished 7th in the 3 x 7.5 km relay.
