= Frode Løberg =

Norwegian biathlete

Personal information
- Full name: Frode Løberg
- Born: 23 January 1963 (age 63) Elverum, Hedmark, Norway
- Height: 1.81 m (5 ft 11 in)

Sport

Professional information
- Sport: Biathlon
- Club: Elverum IL
- World Cup debut: 18 December 1986

Olympic Games
- Teams: 2 (1988, 1992)
- Medals: 0

World Championships
- Teams: 6 (1987, 1989, 1990, 1991, 1992, 1993)
- Medals: 2 (0 gold)

World Cup
- Seasons: 7 (1986/87–1992/93)
- Individual victories: 1
- Individual podiums: 4
Medal record
Men's biathlon
Representing Norway
World Championships
Silver medal – second place	1991 Lahti	Team event
Silver medal – second place	1992 Novosibirsk	Team event

Frode Løberg (born 23 January 1963) is a former Norwegian biathlete.

== Life and career ==
Løberg received a silver medal in team event at the 1991 Biathlon World Championships in Lahti, and again in Novosibirsk in 1992. He finished 5th in the team event with the Norwegian team in 1989. He finished 4th in 4 × 7.5 km relay in 1990, and 6th in team event. He competed at the 1988 Winter Olympics in Calgary where he finished 6th in 4 × 7.5 km relay with the Norwegian team. He competed at the 1992 Winter Olympics in Albertville where he finished 8th in the individual, and 5th in 4 × 7.5 km relay.

== Biathlon results ==
All results are sourced from the International Biathlon Union.

=== Olympic Games ===
Event	Individual	Sprint	Relay
(Canada) 1988 Calgary	20th	14th	6th
(France) 1992 Albertville	8th	—	5th

=== World Championships ===
2 medals (2 silver)

Event	Individual	Sprint	Team	Relay
(United States) 1987 Lake Placid	21st	25th	—N/a	—
(Austria) 1989 Feistritz	43rd	28th	11th	—
(Soviet Union) 1990 Minsk	23rd	36th	6th	4th
(Finland) 1991 Lahti	—	—	Silver	—
(Russia) 1992 Novosibirsk	—N/a	—N/a	Silver	—N/a
(Bulgaria) 1993 Borovets	66th	—	12th	9th

*During Olympic seasons competitions are only held for those events not included in the Olympic program.
**Team was added as an event in 1989.

=== Individual victories ===
1 victory (1 Sp)

Season	Date	Location	Discipline	Level
1991–92; 1 victory (1 Sp)	7 March 1992	(Norway) Oslo Holmenkollen	10 km sprint	Biathlon World Cup

*Results are from UIPMB and IBU races which include the Biathlon World Cup, Biathlon World Championships and the Winter Olympic Games.
