= Mona Bollerud =

Norwegian biathlete

Medal record

Women's biathlon

Representing Norway

World Championships
Silver medal – second place	1989 Feistritz an der Drau	Team event
Silver medal – second place	1988 Chamonix	3 × 5 km relay

Mona Bollerud born 1968 in Fiskum in Øvre Eiker is a former Norwegian biathlete. She participated on the Norwegian team that received a silver medal in the 3 × 5 km relay in the 1988 Biathlon World Championships. She received a silver medal in the team event in 1989.
