= Synnøve Thoresen =

Norwegian biathlete

Medal record

Representing Norway

Women's biathlon

World Championships
Silver medal – second place	1989 Freistritz and der Drau	Team event
Bronze medal – third place	1991 Lahti	Team event

Synnøve Thoresen (born 6 May 1966) is a former Norwegian biathlete. She participated on the Norwegian team that received a silver medal in the team race in 1989. She received a bronze medal in 1991.
