= Sverre Istad =

Norwegian biathlete

Medal record

Men's biathlon

Representing Norway

World Championships
Silver medal – second place	1991 Lahti	Team event

Sverre Geir Istad (born 3 January 1965) is a former Norwegian biathlete. He was born in Voss Municipality as the son of Jon Istad, and represented the club Voss IL. He competed at the 1988 Winter Olympics in Calgary.

He won a silver medal in the team event at the Biathlon World Championships 1991.
