= 2008–09 Biathlon World Cup – Overall Women =

== 2007-08 Top 3 Standings ==
| Medal | Athlete | Points |
|---|---|---|
| Gold: | (Germany) Magdalena Neuner | 818 |
| Silver: | (France) Sandrine Bailly | 805 |
| Bronze: | (Germany) Andrea Henkel | 766 |

== Events summary ==
| Event: | Winner: | Second: | Third: |
|---|---|---|---|
| Östersund; 15 km Individual details | Helena Jonsson; Sweden | Kati Wilhelm; Germany | Magdalena Neuner; Germany |
| Östersund; 7.5 km Sprint details | Wang Chunli; China | Tora Berger; Norway | Magdalena Neuner; Germany |
| Östersund; 10 km Pursuit details | Martina Beck; Germany | Svetlana Sleptsova; Russia | Kati Wilhelm; Germany |
| Hochfilzen; 7.5 km Sprint details | Simone Hauswald; Germany | Svetlana Sleptsova; Russia | Andrea Henkel; Germany |
| Hochfilzen; 10 km Pursuit details | Martina Beck; Germany | Svetlana Sleptsova; Russia | Simone Hauswald; Germany |
| Hochfilzen; 15 km Individual details | Éva Tófalvi; Romania | Svetlana Sleptsova; Russia | Simone Hauswald; Germany |
| Hochfilzen; 7.5 km Sprint details | Svetlana Sleptsova; Russia | Vita Semerenko; Ukraine | Helena Jonsson; Sweden |
| Oberhof; 7.5 km Sprint details | Andrea Henkel; Germany | Helena Jonsson; Sweden | Tora Berger; Norway |
| Oberhof; 12.5 km Mass start details | Kati Wilhelm; Germany | Olga Medvedtseva; Russia | Helena Jonsson; Sweden |
| Ruhpolding; 7.5 km Sprint details | Magdalena Neuner; Germany | Kati Wilhelm; Germany | Darya Domracheva; Belarus |
| Ruhpolding; 10 km Pursuit details | Magdalena Neuner; Germany | Kati Wilhelm; Germany | Tora Berger; Norway |
| Antholz; 7.5 km Sprint details | Tora Berger; Norway | Darya Domracheva; Belarus | Kati Wilhelm; Germany |
| Antholz; 10 km Pursuit details | Anna Boulygina; Russia | Kaisa Mäkäräinen; Finland | Darya Domracheva; Belarus |
| Antholz; 12.5 km Mass start details | Helena Jonsson; Sweden | Kaisa Mäkäräinen; Finland | Kati Wilhelm; Germany |
| World Championships; 7.5 km Sprint details | Kati Wilhelm; Germany | Simone Hauswald; Germany | Olga Zaitseva; Russia |
| World Championships; 10 km Pursuit details | Helena Jonsson; Sweden | Kati Wilhelm; Germany | Olga Zaitseva; Russia |
| World Championships; 15 km Individual details | Kati Wilhelm; Germany | Teja Gregorin; Slovenia | Tora Berger; Norway |
| World Championships; 12.5 km Mass start details | Olga Zaitseva; Russia | Anastasiya Kuzmina; Slovakia | Helena Jonsson; Sweden |
| Vancouver; 15 km Individual details | Simone Hauswald; Germany | Olga Zaitseva; Russia | Vita Semerenko; Ukraine |
| Vancouver; 7.5 km Sprint details | Helena Jonsson; Sweden | Magdalena Neuner; Germany | Olga Zaitseva; Russia |
| Trondheim; 7.5 km Sprint details | Olga Zaitseva; Russia | Helena Jonsson; Sweden | Sylvie Becaert; France |
| Trondheim; 10 km Pursuit details | Andrea Henkel; Germany | Olga Zaitseva; Russia | Marie-Laure Brunet; France |
| Trondheim; 12.5 km Mass start details | Tora Berger; Norway | Simone Hauswald; Germany | Sandrine Bailly; France |
| Khanty-Mansiysk; 7.5 km Sprint details | Tina Bachmann; Germany | Simone Hauswald; Germany | Anna Carin Olofsson; Sweden |
| Khanty-Mansiysk; 10 km Pursuit details | Magdalena Neuner; Germany | Michela Ponza; Italy | Marie Dorin; France |
| Khanty-Mansiysk; 12.5 km Mass start details | Simone Hauswald; Germany | Helena Jonsson; Sweden | Andrea Henkel; Germany |

== Final standings ==
| # | Name | ÖST IN | ÖST SP | ÖST PU | HOC SP | HOC PU | HOC IN | HOC SP | OBE SP | OBE MS | RUH SP | RUH PU | ANT SP | ANT PU | ANT MS | WCH SP | WCH PU | WCH IN | WCH MS | VAN IN | VAN SP | TRO SP | TRO PU | TRO MS | KHA SP | KHA PU | KHA MS | Total |
|---|---|---|---|---|---|---|---|---|---|---|---|---|---|---|---|---|---|---|---|---|---|---|---|---|---|---|---|---|
| 1. | (Sweden) Helena Jonsson | 60 | ~~12~~ | 34 | 43 | 40 | ~~14~~ | 48 | 54 | 48 | 34 | 36 | 17 | 21 | 60 | 40 | 60 | 34 | 48 | ~~17~~ | 60 | 54 | 31 | 29 | 22 | 25 | 54 | 952 |
| 2 | (Germany) Kati Wilhelm | 54 | 38 | 48 | 24 | 36 | – | – | 40 | 60 | 54 | 54 | 48 | 40 | 48 | 60 | 54 | 60 | 11 | ~~1~~ | 34 | 28 | 40 | 40 | 21 | 22 | 38 | 952 |
| 3 | (Norway) Tora Berger | 38 | 54 | 40 | 40 | 43 | – | – | 48 | 32 | 29 | 48 | 60 | 28 | – | 22 | 32 | 48 | 26 | 36 | 43 | 30 | 43 | 60 | 26 | 40 | 28 | 894 |
| 4 | (Germany) Magdalena Neuner | 48 | 48 | 24 | 22 | ~~14~~ | 38 | 40 | 30 | 43 | 60 | 60 | 27 | 34 | 38 | 34 | 30 | – | 36 | 43 | 54 | ~~16~~ | 23 | 27 | 43 | 60 | 29 | 891 |
| 5 | (Germany) Andrea Henkel | 31 | 29 | 43 | 48 | 32 | ~~9~~ | ~~0~~ | 60 | 29 | 25 | 29 | 30 | 38 | 40 | 38 | – | 31 | 40 | 40 | 40 | 31 | 60 | 25 | 19 | 32 | 48 | 838 |
| 6 | (Russia) Olga Zaitseva | ~~13~~ | ~~5~~ | 18 | ~~12~~ | 28 | 32 | 30 | 24 | 26 | 36 | 34 | 14 | 19 | 36 | 48 | 48 | 27 | 60 | 54 | 48 | 60 | 54 | 32 | 36 | 36 | 34 | 834 |
| 7 | (Belarus) Darya Domracheva | 32 | 31 | 36 | 36 | ~~0~~ | 25 | 25 | 38 | ~~0~~ | 48 | 32 | 54 | 48 | 22 | 0 | 40 | 30 | 38 | – | 31 | 32 | 38 | 43 | 34 | 20 | 43 | 776 |
| 8 | (Germany) Martina Beck | 36 | 34 | 60 | 38 | 60 | 28 | 29 | ~~0~~ | – | ~~6~~ | 20 | 32 | 32 | 29 | 29 | 38 | 13 | 30 | 19 | 28 | 7 | 25 | 21 | 18 | 29 | 30 | 685 |
| 9 | (Germany) Simone Hauswald | – | – | – | 60 | 48 | 48 | 0 | 25 | 31 | – | – | 6 | 15 | 24 | 54 | 29 | – | 29 | 60 | 29 | 3 | 20 | 54 | 54 | 28 | 60 | 677 |
| 10 | (Sweden) Anna Carin Olofsson | 29 | 0 | 23 | 34 | 30 | 23 | 36 | – | – | 32 | 38 | 20 | 43 | 43 | 27 | 26 | 43 | 21 | ~~0~~ | 24 | 12 | 2 | 22 | 48 | 38 | 31 | 645 |
| 11 | (Romania) Éva Tófalvi | ~~6~~ | 32 | 38 | 30 | ~~9~~ | 60 | 32 | 32 | 25 | 13 | 30 | ~~11~~ | 20 | 26 | 21 | 20 | 36 | 27 | 27 | 36 | 22 | 32 | 23 | 29 | 13 | 16 | 640 |
| 12 | (Russia) Svetlana Sleptsova | 24 | 40 | 54 | 54 | 54 | 54 | 60 | 36 | 40 | 40 | 43 | – | – | – | 5 | 13 | – | 22 | 16 | 18 | 20 | – | – | 16 | – | 19 | 628 |
| 13 | (Ukraine) Vita Semerenko | 34 | 43 | 30 | 0 | 0 | 20 | 54 | – | 20 | 14 | 7 | – | – | 20 | 15 | 22 | 29 | 43 | 48 | 38 | 36 | 30 | 17 | 40 | 43 | 23 | 626 |
| 14 | (Finland) Kaisa Mäkäräinen | 0 | 6 | 7 | 0 | ~~0~~ | 36 | 43 | 22 | 38 | 38 | 27 | 40 | 54 | 54 | 18 | 43 | 11 | 24 | – | – | 13 | 29 | 20 | 12 | 18 | 24 | 577 |
| 15 | (China) Liu Xianying | 40 | 24 | 29 | 31 | 38 | 34 | 31 | 31 | 17 | 31 | 40 | 19 | 36 | 21 | 28 | 12 | 0 | 23 | 18 | 0 | 19 | – | 14 | – | – | – | 536 |
| 16 | (France) Marie-Laure Brunet | 22 | 14 | 20 | 0 | 10 | – | 6 | 34 | 34 | – | – | 12 | 16 | 30 | 0 | 36 | 26 | 34 | – | 0 | 38 | 48 | 34 | 23 | 30 | 17 | 484 |
| 17 | (Russia) Olga Medvedtseva | 0 | 8 | 27 | 29 | 31 | 43 | 11 | 43 | 54 | 28 | 28 | – | – | – | 20 | 27 | 22 | 32 | 0 | 25 | 0 | – | 18 | – | – | 36 | 482 |
| 18 | (Italy) Michela Ponza | 8 | 15 | 14 | 21 | 13 | 19 | 9 | 13 | 15 | ~~0~~ | 12 | 34 | 17 | 18 | 24 | 28 | ~~3~~ | – | 31 | 9 | 23 | 18 | 16 | 30 | 54 | 27 | 468 |
| 19 | (Russia) Anna Boulygina | 4 | 0 | 0 | – | – | – | 34 | 4 | – | 17 | 1 | 43 | 60 | 23 | 43 | 21 | 16 | 18 | 0 | 10 | 26 | 13 | 38 | 31 | 31 | 32 | 465 |
| 20 | (Moldova) Natalia Levchenkova | 27 | 28 | 19 | 23 | 29 | ~~0~~ | 27 | 15 | 36 | 23 | 8 | 24 | 25 | 28 | ~~0~~ | 34 | 23 | 16 | 11 | 20 | 0 | 0 | 15 | 5 | – | 11 | 447 |
| 21 | (China) Wang Chunli | 0 | 60 | 32 | 20 | 8 | 30 | 0 | 23 | 14 | 43 | 31 | 4 | 6 | 16 | 10 | 0 | 0 | – | 4 | 22 | 43 | 26 | 11 | – | – | – | 403 |
| 22 | (Ukraine) Oksana Khvostenko | 43 | 27 | 28 | 0 | 26 | 27 | 19 | 28 | – | – | – | 31 | 24 | 25 | 7 | 19 | 20 | 20 | 29 | 13 | – | – | – | – | – | – | 386 |
| 23 | (France) Sandrine Bailly | 0 | 17 | 0 | 0 | – | 10 | – | – | – | 22 | 4 | – | – | – | 31 | 1 | 32 | 14 | 38 | 32 | 40 | 24 | 48 | 1 | 21 | 21 | 356 |
| 24 | (Ukraine) Valj Semerenko | 16 | 9 | 25 | 0 | – | 0 | 23 | 26 | 19 | 6 | 26 | – | – | 31 | 26 | 3 | 15 | 25 | 25 | 0 | 0 | – | 12 | 15 | 7 | 40 | 349 |
| 25 | (Norway) Julie Bonnevie-Svendsen | 28 | 3 | 6 | 28 | 27 | 0 | – | – | – | 27 | 18 | 0 | – | 32 | 9 | 0 | – | – | – | – | 25 | 36 | 24 | 25 | 34 | 26 | 348 |
| 26 | (France) Sylvie Becaert | 0 | 19 | 16 | 0 | – | 0 | 21 | 0 | – | 0 | 9 | 22 | 31 | 27 | 0 | 4 | 19 | – | 20 | 16 | 48 | 28 | 26 | 0 | 17 | 22 | 345 |
| 27 | (Poland) Magdalena Gwizdon | 0 | 30 | 26 | 32 | 34 | 0 | 22 | 18 | 23 | 12 | 5 | 8 | 0 | – | 0 | – | 1 | – | 0 | 1 | 27 | 27 | 19 | 24 | 19 | 13 | 341 |
| 28 | (France) Marie Dorin | 0 | 0 | 11 | 14 | 11 | 0 | 0 | 0 | – | 26 | 24 | 7 | 2 | – | 0 | 23 | 8 | – | 14 | 0 | 24 | 19 | 31 | 32 | 48 | 20 | 314 |
| 29 | (Norway) Solveig Rogstad | 5 | 36 | 31 | 26 | 18 | 40 | – | – | – | 0 | – | – | – | – | 17 | 18 | 0 | – | 0 | 14 | 11 | 1 | 30 | 28 | 23 | – | 298 |
| 30 | (Slovakia) Anastasiya Kuzmina | – | – | – | – | – | – | 5 | – | – | 10 | 16 | 0 | 1 | – | 36 | 24 | 12 | 54 | 32 | 30 | 0 | 9 | 36 | 0 | 0 | 25 | 290 |
| # | Name | ÖST IN | ÖST SP | ÖST PU | HOC SP | HOC PU | HOC IN | HOC SP | OBE SP | OBE MS | RUH SP | RUH PU | ANT SP | ANT PU | ANT MS | WCH SP | WCH PU | WCH IN | WCH MS | VAN IN | VAN SP | TRO SP | TRO PU | TRO MS | KHA SP | KHA PU | KHA MS | Total |
| 31 | (Germany) Kathrin Hitzer | 3 | 22 | 0 | 27 | 22 | 15 | 38 | 0 | 28 | 18 | 22 | 26 | 30 | 17 | – | – | 0 | – | – | – | – | – | – | – | – | – | 268 |
| 32 | (Slovenia) Teja Gregorin | 3 | 0 | – | 6 | 23 | – | – | – | – | 16 | 11 | 0 | 22 | – | 0 | – | 54 | 28 | 26 | 0 | 1 | 17 | 28 | 8 | 2 | 15 | 260 |
| 33 | (Belarus) Olga Kudrashova | 15 | 13 | 1 | 9 | 5 | 0 | 12 | 17 | 27 | 21 | 21 | 36 | 29 | 19 | 0 | – | 0 | – | 0 | 4 | 0 | 0 | – | – | – | – | 229 |
| 34 | (Slovenia) Andreja Mali | ~~0~~ | 25 | 8 | 15 | 0 | 26 | 24 | 14 | 16 | 0 | – | 5 | 0 | 14 | 0 | 0 | 0 | – | 13 | 17 | 0 | 8 | 13 | 0 | 4 | 14 | 216 |
| 35 | (Russia) Oksana Neupokoeva | – | 23 | 17 | 18 | 21 | 17 | 17 | – | – | – | – | – | – | – | – | – | – | – | 13 | 5 | 17 | 22 | – | 9 | 6 | 18 | 203 |
| 36 | (Czech Republic) Veronika Vítková | – | – | – | 0 | – | 0 | 26 | 0 | – | 7 | – | – | – | – | 23 | 31 | 40 | 31 | – | – | 0 | 11 | – | 4 | 11 | 12 | 196 |
| 37 | (Norway) Ann Kristin Flatland | – | 20 | 12 | 5 | 20 | 8 | 3 | 27 | 30 | 0 | – | – | – | 34 | 8 | 11 | 0 | – | – | – | 8 | 0 | – | – | – | – | 186 |
| 38 | (Belarus) Nadezhda Skardino | 25 | 18 | 0 | 0 | 0 | 29 | 1 | 8 | 18 | 0 | 0 | 0 | – | 15 | – | – | 9 | – | 8 | 0 | 0 | 4 | – | 20 | 24 | – | 179 |
| 39 | (Belarus) Olga Nazarova | 0 | 0 | – | 0 | 3 | 2 | 20 | 11 | – | 19 | 25 | 0 | – | – | 32 | 15 | 8 | 15 | 6 | 0 | 5 | 7 | – | 6 | 0 | – | 174 |
| 40 | (Estonia) Eveli Saue | 0 | 7 | 0 | 0 | 4 | 11 | 2 | 0 | – | 1 | 0 | 38 | 26 | – | 0 | 9 | 0 | – | 30 | 2 | 0 | 12 | – | 10 | 15 | – | 167 |
| 41 | (Canada) Zina Kocher | 0 | 1 | – | 0 | 0 | 0 | 18 | – | – | 8 | 19 | 18 | 14 | – | 11 | 17 | 6 | – | 0 | 0 | 21 | 0 | – | 17 | 8 | – | 158 |
| 42 | (Italy) Katja Haller | 12 | 0 | 5 | 0 | 12 | 31 | 0 | 0 | – | 0 | – | 0 | 0 | – | 16 | 16 | 24 | 17 | 0 | 0 | 0 | – | – | 14 | 9 | – | 156 |
| 43 | (Poland) Weronika Nowakowska | 21 | 0 | – | 17 | 0 | – | 0 | – | – | 0 | 13 | 0 | 0 | – | 6 | 25 | 5 | – | 34 | 19 | 0 | – | – | 13 | 1 | – | 154 |
| 44 | (Norway) Anne Ingstadbjoerg | 30 | 0 | 0 | 7 | 19 | 16 | – | – | – | 0 | – | 1 | 5 | – | – | – | 15 | – | 28 | 6 | 10 | 10 | – | – | – | – | 147 |
| 45 | (Russia) Iana Romanova | – | – | – | – | – | – | – | – | – | – | – | 28 | 23 | – | – | – | 17 | – | 15 | 7 | 15 | 15 | – | 3 | 16 | – | 139 |
| 46 | (Germany) Juliane Doll | – | – | – | – | – | – | – | – | – | – | – | 23 | 27 | – | – | – | – | – | 21 | 0 | 0 | 21 | – | 27 | 14 | – | 133 |
| 47 | (China) Dong Xue | 11 | 26 | 22 | 0 | 7 | 5 | 0 | 0 | 22 | 0 | 0 | 0 | – | 13 | 0 | – | 0 | – | 0 | 23 | 2 | 0 | – | – | – | – | 131 |
| 48 | (Czech Republic) Magda Rezlerova | 18 | 11 | 3 | 0 | – | 7 | 0 | 0 | – | 0 | 14 | 13 | 0 | – | 2 | 7 | 0 | – | 0 | 12 | 29 | 5 | – | – | – | – | 121 |
| 49 | (Germany) Tina Bachmann | – | – | – | – | – | – | – | – | – | – | – | – | – | – | – | – | – | – | – | – | 18 | 14 | – | 60 | 27 | – | 119 |
| 50 | (China) Kong Yingchao | 10 | 21 | 15 | 8 | 15 | 24 | 0 | 0 | 24 | 0 | – | – | – | – | – | – | – | – | – | – | – | – | – | – | – | – | 117 |
| 51 | (Kazakhstan) Elena Khrustaleva | 0 | 0 | – | 4 | 24 | 0 | 28 | 1 | – | 0 | – | – | – | – | 3 | 0 | 38 | 12 | – | – | – | – | – | – | – | – | 110 |
| 52 | (Ukraine) Olena Pidrushna | 14 | 0 | 9 | 0 | – | 0 | 14 | – | – | 0 | 10 | – | – | – | – | – | 25 | – | 7 | – | 0 | 0 | – | 11 | 10 | – | 100 |
| 53 | (Poland) Agnieszka Grzybek | – | – | – | 0 | – | 21 | 0 | 3 | – | 9 | 3 | 15 | 3 | – | 1 | 8 | 21 | – | 0 | 15 | 0 | – | – | 0 | 0 | – | 99 |
| 54 | (Poland) Krystyna Pałka | – | – | – | – | – | 0 | 0 | 0 | – | 0 | 0 | 0 | 8 | – | 0 | 0 | – | – | 0 | 21 | 34 | 34 | – | 0 | – | – | 97 |
| 55 | (Sweden) Sofia Domeij | 7 | 0 | – | 3 | 2 | 0 | 0 | 16 | – | 24 | 15 | 16 | 0 | – | – | – | 0 | – | 0 | 8 | 6 | 0 | – | 0 | 0 | – | 97 |
| 56 | (Lithuania) Diana Rasimovičiūtė | 0 | 2 | 0 | 11 | 0 | 12 | 0 | 0 | – | 2 | 0 | – | – | – | 30 | 10 | 0 | 13 | 3 | 11 | 0 | – | – | – | – | – | 94 |
| 57 | (Ukraine) Lilia Vaygina-Efremova | 20 | 0 | 10 | 10 | 0 | 6 | 17 | 19 | 21 | – | – | 0 | – | – | 0 | – | – | – | – | – | – | – | – | – | – | – | 93 |
| 58 | (France) Pauline Macabies | 0 | 0 | – | 19 | 0 | 0 | 10 | 6 | – | 0 | 0 | 0 | – | – | – | – | – | – | 24 | 26 | 0 | 6 | – | – | – | – | 91 |
| 59 | (Sweden) Anna Maria Nilsson | 0 | 0 | – | 0 | 0 | 13 | 0 | 21 | – | 20 | 0 | 0 | 4 | – | 0 | 0 | 0 | – | 0 | 27 | 0 | 0 | – | 2 | 3 | – | 90 |
| 60 | (Norway) Liv Kjersti Eikeland | 26 | 0 | 0 | 0 | – | 0 | 15 | – | – | 11 | 0 | 29 | 7 | – | – | – | – | – | 0 | 0 | 0 | 0 | – | – | – | – | 88 |
| # | Name | ÖST IN | ÖST SP | ÖST PU | HOC SP | HOC PU | HOC IN | HOC SP | OBE SP | OBE MS | RUH SP | RUH PU | ANT SP | ANT PU | ANT MS | WCH SP | WCH PU | WCH IN | WCH MS | VAN IN | VAN SP | TRO SP | TRO PU | TRO MS | KHA SP | KHA PU | KHA MS | Total |
| 61 | (France) Julie Carraz-Collin | 0 | 10 | 13 | 2 | 16 | 1 | 16 | 5 | – | 0 | 0 | 0 | – | – | – | – | – | – | 22 | 0 | – | – | – | – | – | – | 85 |
| 62 | (Bulgaria) Pavlina Filipova | 9 | 0 | 2 | 1 | 0 | 0 | – | 0 | – | – | – | 0 | 9 | – | 0 | 14 | 28 | 19 | – | – | – | – | – | – | – | – | 82 |
| 63 | (China) Song Chaoqing | 0 | 0 | 0 | 0 | 6 | 3 | 0 | 2 | – | 30 | 23 | 0 | 13 | – | 4 | 0 | – | – | 0 | – | – | – | – | – | – | – | 81 |
| 64 | (Latvia) Madara Liduma | 19 | 16 | 21 | 0 | 0 | 0 | 0 | 0 | – | 0 | – | 0 | 0 | – | 0 | – | 10 | – | 0 | 0 | 4 | 0 | – | – | – | – | 70 |
| 65 | (Russia) Olga Vilukhina | – | – | – | – | – | – | – | – | – | – | – | – | – | – | – | – | – | – | – | – | – | – | – | 38 | 26 | – | 64 |
| 66 | (Estonia) Kadri Lehtla | 0 | 0 | 4 | 0 | – | 4 | 8 | 0 | – | 0 | – | 0 | – | – | 13 | 0 | 0 | – | – | – | 14 | 16 | – | – | – | – | 59 |
| 67 | (Romania) Dana Plotogea | 0 | 0 | 0 | 0 | 0 | 0 | 0 | 9 | – | 0 | 0 | 2 | 10 | – | 25 | 6 | 0 | – | 0 | 0 | 0 | 0 | – | 0 | – | – | 52 |
| 68 | (Russia) Olga Anisimova | 0 | – | – | – | – | – | – | 7 | – | 0 | 0 | 21 | 18 | – | – | – | – | – | – | – | – | – | – | 0 | 5 | – | 51 |
| 69 | (Czech Republic) Zdenka Vejnarova | 0 | 0 | 0 | 16 | 0 | 0 | 0 | 0 | – | 15 | 0 | 0 | 11 | – | – | – | 0 | – | 9 | 0 | 0 | – | – | – | – | – | 51 |
| 70 | (Russia) Natalia Sokolova | – | – | – | 25 | 25 | 0 | – | – | – | – | – | – | – | – | – | – | – | – | – | – | – | – | – | – | – | – | 50 |
| 71 | (China) Liu Yuan-Yuan | 0 | 0 | 0 | 0 | – | 0 | 0 | 29 | – | 3 | 17 | 0 | 0 | – | – | – | 0 | – | 0 | 0 | 0 | – | – | – | – | – | 49 |
| 72 | (Belarus) Liudmila Kalinchik | 0 | 0 | – | 0 | – | 0 | 0 | 11 | – | 4 | 6 | 10 | 12 | – | 0 | 0 | – | – | 2 | 0 | 0 | 0 | – | 0 | – | – | 45 |
| 73 | (Germany) Sabrina Buchholz | 1 | 0 | – | 0 | 17 | – | – | 21 | – | 0 | – | – | – | – | – | – | – | – | – | – | – | – | – | – | – | – | 39 |
| 74 | (Germany) Anne Preussler | 17 | 0 | – | – | – | 18 | 0 | – | – | – | – | – | – | – | – | – | – | – | – | – | – | – | – | – | – | – | 35 |
| 75 | (Poland) Paulina Bobak | 0 | 0 | – | 0 | – | 22 | 0 | 0 | – | 0 | – | 0 | 0 | – | – | – | 4 | – | – | – | 0 | 3 | – | – | – | – | 29 |
| 76 | (Kazakhstan) Anna Lebedeva | 0 | 0 | – | 0 | 0 | 0 | 13 | 0 | – | 0 | 2 | – | – | – | 14 | 0 | 0 | – | – | – | – | – | – | – | – | – | 29 |
| 77 | (Belarus) Liudmila Ananko | 23 | – | – | 0 | – | 0 | 4 | – | – | – | – | – | – | – | – | – | – | – | – | – | – | – | – | – | – | – | 27 |
| 78 | (Italy) Roberta Fiandino | 0 | 0 | 0 | 0 | – | 0 | – | – | – | 0 | 0 | 25 | 0 | – | 0 | – | 0 | – | 0 | 0 | – | – | – | – | – | – | 25 |
| 79 | (Czech Republic) Veronika Zvaricova | – | – | – | – | – | – | – | 0 | – | – | – | – | – | – | 19 | 5 | – | – | – | – | – | – | – | – | – | – | 24 |
| 80 | (Sweden) Jenny Jonsson | 0 | 0 | – | 0 | – | 0 | 0 | 0 | – | 0 | – | – | – | – | – | – | – | – | 23 | 0 | 0 | 0 | – | – | – | – | 23 |
| 81 | (Norway) Synnøve Solemdal | – | – | – | – | – | – | – | – | – | – | – | – | – | – | – | – | – | – | – | – | 0 | – | – | 7 | 12 | – | 19 |
| 82 | (United States) Haley Johnson | 0 | 0 | 0 | 0 | – | 0 | 0 | 0 | – | 0 | – | 0 | – | – | 0 | – | 18 | – | 0 | 0 | 0 | – | – | – | – | – | 18 |
| 83 | (Romania) Mihaela Purdea | 0 | 4 | 0 | 13 | 1 | 0 | 0 | 0 | – | 0 | – | 0 | – | – | 0 | 0 | 0 | – | 0 | 0 | 0 | 0 | – | 0 | 0 | – | 18 |
| 84 | (Switzerland) Selina Gasparin | – | – | – | 0 | – | 0 | 0 | 12 | – | 0 | 0 | 0 | 0 | – | 0 | – | 0 | – | – | – | 0 | – | – | 0 | 0 | – | 12 |
| 85 | (Romania) Alexandra Stoian | 0 | 0 | – | 0 | – | 0 | 0 | 0 | – | 0 | – | 0 | 0 | – | 12 | 0 | 0 | – | 0 | 0 | 0 | – | – | 0 | 0 | – | 12 |
| 86 | (Slovakia) Lubomira Kalinova | 0 | 0 | – | 0 | – | 0 | 0 | – | – | 0 | – | 0 | – | – | 0 | – | 0 | – | 10 | 0 | 0 | – | – | – | – | – | 10 |
| 87 | (Italy) Christa Perathoner | – | – | – | – | – | – | 0 | – | – | 0 | – | 9 | 0 | – | 0 | 0 | – | – | 0 | 0 | – | – | – | – | – | – | 9 |
| 88 | (Finland) Teija Kuntola | 0 | 0 | – | 0 | – | 0 | 0 | – | – | 0 | – | 0 | 0 | – | 0 | 0 | 0 | – | – | – | 9 | 0 | – | – | – | – | 9 |
| 89 | (Norway) Kari Henneseid Eie | 0 | – | – | 0 | – | 0 | 0 | – | – | – | – | – | – | – | – | – | – | – | 5 | 0 | – | – | – | – | – | – | 5 |
| 90 | (Slovakia) Martina Halinarova | 0 | 0 | – | 0 | – | 0 | 0 | – | – | 0 | – | 3 | 0 | – | 0 | – | 0 | – | – | – | – | – | – | – | – | – | 3 |
| 91 | (United States) Sara Studebaker | – | – | – | – | – | – | – | – | – | – | – | – | – | – | – | – | – | – | 0 | 3 | – | – | – | – | – | – | 3 |
| 92 | (United States) Lanny Barnes | 0 | 0 | – | 0 | – | 0 | 0 | – | – | 0 | – | 0 | – | – | 0 | 2 | 0 | – | 0 | – | – | – | – | – | – | – | 2 |
| 93 | (Croatia) Andrijana Stipanicic | – | – | – | 0 | – | 0 | 0 | 0 | – | 0 | – | 0 | – | – | 0 | – | 2 | – | 0 | – | 0 | – | – | – | – | – | 2 |
| # | Name | ÖST IN | ÖST SP | ÖST PU | HOC SP | HOC PU | HOC IN | HOC SP | OBE SP | OBE MS | RUH SP | RUH PU | ANT SP | ANT PU | ANT MS | WCH SP | WCH PU | WCH IN | WCH MS | VAN IN | VAN SP | TRO SP | TRO PU | TRO MS | KHA SP | KHA PU | KHA MS | Total |
