= 2008–09 Biathlon World Cup – Sprint Women =

The 2008-09 Biathlon World Cup/Sprint Women will start at Saturday December 6, 2008 in Östersund and will finish Thursday March 26, 2009 in Khanty-Mansiysk. Defending titlist is Magdalena Neuner of Germany.

== Competition format ==
The 7.5 kilometres (4.7 mi) sprint race is the third oldest biathlon event; the distance is skied over three laps. The biathlete shoots two times at any shooting lane, first prone, then standing, totalling 10 targets. For each missed target the biathlete has to complete a penalty lap of around 150 metres. Competitors' starts are staggered, normally by 30 seconds.

== 2007-08 Top 3 Standings ==
Medal	Athlete	Points
Gold:	(Germany) Magdalena Neuner	326
Silver:	(France) Sandrine Bailly	318
Bronze:	(Germany) Kati Wilhelm	306

== Medal winners ==
Event:	Gold:	Time	Silver:	Time	Bronze:	Time
Östersund details	Wang Chunli; China	22:48.1 (0+0)	Tora Berger; Norway	22:49.5 (0+0)	Magdalena Neuner; Germany	22:52.9 (0+0)
Hochfilzen details	Simone Hauswald; Germany	23:04.3 (0+0)	Svetlana Sleptsova; Russia	23:18.4 (0+2)	Andrea Henkel; Germany	23:22.6 (0+1)
Hochfilzen details	Svetlana Sleptsova; Russia	23:21.8 (1+0)	Vita Semerenko; Ukraine	23:38.4 (0+0)	Helena Jonsson; Sweden	23:46.1 (0+0)
Oberhof details	Andrea Henkel; Germany	22:12.1 (0+0)	Helena Jonsson; Sweden	22:29.3 (0+0)	Tora Berger; Norway	22:30.0 (0+0)
Ruhpolding details	Magdalena Neuner; Germany	23:26.6 (0+1)	Kati Wilhelm; Germany	23:26.8 (0+0)	Darya Domracheva; Belarus	23:40.6 (0+0)
Antholz details	Tora Berger; Norway	21:25.5 (0+1)	Darya Domracheva; Belarus	21.33.6 (1+0)	Kati Wilhelm; Germany	21:46.2 (1+0)
World Championships details	Kati Wilhelm; Germany	21:11.1 (0+0)	Simone Hauswald; Germany	21:21.0 (0+0)	Olga Zaitseva; Russia	21:38.2 (0+0)
Vancouver details	Helena Jonsson; Sweden	19:43.6 (0+0)	Magdalena Neuner; Germany	19:44.3 (0+1)	Olga Zaitseva; Russia	19:45.2 (0+0)
Trondheim details	Olga Zaitseva; Russia	22:56.9 (0+0)	Helena Jonsson; Sweden	23:02.4 (0+0)	Sylvie Becaert; France	23:08.0 (0+1)
Khanty-Mansiysk details	Tina Bachmann; Germany	20:49.8 (0+0)	Simone Hauswald; Germany	20:53.5 (0+0)	Anna Carin Olofsson; Sweden	21:09.1 (0+0)

== Final standings ==
#	Name	ÖST	HOC	HOC	OBE	RUH	ANT	WCH	VAN	TRO	KHA	Total
1.	(Sweden) Helena Jonsson	~~12~~	43	48	54	34	17	40	60	54	22	372
2	(Germany) Magdalena Neuner	48	22	40	30	60	27	34	54	~~16~~	43	358
3	(Norway) Tora Berger	54	40	–	48	29	60	22	43	30	26	352
4	(Germany) Kati Wilhelm	38	24	–	40	54	48	60	34	28	21	347
5	(Belarus) Darya Domracheva	31	36	25	38	48	54	~~0~~	31	32	34	329
6	(Germany) Andrea Henkel	29	48	~~0~~	60	25	30	38	40	31	19	320
7	(Russia) Olga Zaitseva	~~5~~	12	30	24	36	14	48	48	60	36	308
8	(Russia) Svetlana Sleptsova	40	54	60	36	40	–	5	18	20	16	273
9	(Romania) Éva Tófalvi	32	30	32	32	13	~~11~~	21	36	22	29	247
10	(Ukraine) Vita Semerenko	43	0	54	–	14	–	15	38	36	40	240
11	(Sweden) Anna Carin Olofsson	0	34	36	–	32	20	27	24	12	48	233
12	(Germany) Simone Hauswald	–	60	0	25	–	6	54	29	3	54	231
13	(China) Wang Chunli	60	20	0	23	43	4	10	22	43	–	225
14	(Germany) Martina Beck	34	38	29	~~0~~	6	32	29	28	7	18	221
15	(China) Liu Xianying	24	31	31	31	31	19	28	0	19	–	214
16	(Russia) Anna Boulygina	0	–	34	4	17	43	43	10	26	31	208
17	(Finland) Kaisa Mäkäräinen	6	0	43	22	38	40	18	–	13	12	192
18	(Italy) Michela Ponza	15	21	9	13	~~0~~	34	24	9	23	30	178
19	(Poland) Magdalena Gwizdon	30	32	22	18	12	8	~~0~~	1	27	24	174
20	(Moldova) Natalia Levchenkova	28	23	27	15	23	24	~~0~~	20	0	5	165
21	(Russia) Olga Medvedtseva	8	29	11	43	28	–	20	25	0	–	164
22	(France) Sandrine Bailly	17	0	–	–	22	–	31	32	40	1	143
23	(Norway) Solveig Rogstad	36	26	–	–	0	–	17	14	11	28	132
24	(Germany) Kathrin Hitzer	22	27	38	0	18	26	–	–	–	–	131
25	(France) Marie-Laure Brunet	14	0	6	34	–	12	0	0	38	23	127
26	(France) Sylvie Becaert	19	~~0~~	21	0	0	22	0	16	48	0	126
27	(Ukraine) Oksana Khvostenko	27	0	19	28	–	31	7	13	–	–	125
28	(Norway) Julie Bonnevie-Svendsen	3	28	–	–	27	0	9	–	25	25	117
29	(Belarus) Olga Kudrashova	13	9	12	17	21	36	0	4	0	–	112
30	(Ukraine) Valj Semerenko	9	0	23	26	6	–	26	0	0	15	105
31	(France) Marie Dorin	0	14	~~0~~	0	26	7	0	0	24	32	103
32	(Slovenia) Andreja Mali	25	15	24	14	~~0~~	5	0	17	0	0	100
33	(Canada) Zina Kocher	1	0	18	–	8	18	11	0	21	17	94
34	(Belarus) Olga Nazarova	~~0~~	0	20	11	19	0	32	0	5	6	93
35	(Russia) Oksana Neupokoeva	23	18	17	–	–	–	–	5	17	9	89
36	(Slovakia) Anastasiya Kuzmina	–	–	5	–	10	0	36	30	0	0	81
37	(Germany) Tina Bachmann	–	–	–	–	–	–	–	–	18	60	78
38	(Sweden) Sofia Domeij	0	3	0	16	24	16	–	8	6	0	73
39	(Norway) Ann Kristin Flatland	20	5	3	27	0	–	8	–	8	–	71
40	(Sweden) Anna Maria Nilsson	0	~~0~~	0	21	20	0	0	27	0	2	70
41	(Czech Republic) Magda Rezlerova	11	0	0	0	0	13	2	12	29	–	67
42	(France) Pauline Macabies	0	19	10	6	0	0	–	26	0	–	61
43	(Estonia) Eveli Saue	7	0	2	~~0~~	1	38	0	2	0	10	60
44	(Czech Republic) Veronika Vítková	–	0	26	0	7	–	23	–	0	4	60
45	(Lithuania) Diana Rasimovičiūtė	2	11	0	0	2	–	30	11	0	–	56
46	(Poland) Krystyna Pałka	–	–	0	0	0	0	0	21	34	0	55
47	(Norway) Liv Kjersti Eikeland	0	0	15	–	11	29	–	0	0	–	55
48	(Poland) Weronika Nowakowska	0	17	0	–	0	0	6	19	0	13	55
49	(Russia) Iana Romanova	–	–	–	–	–	28	–	7	15	3	53
50	(China) Dong Xue	26	0	0	0	0	0	0	23	2	–	51
51	(Germany) Juliane Doll	–	–	–	–	–	23	–	0	0	27	50
52	(Belarus) Nadezhda Skardino	18	0	1	8	0	0	–	0	0	20	47
53	(Poland) Agnieszka Grzybek	–	0	0	3	9	15	1	15	0	0	43
54	(Russia) Olga Vilukhina	–	–	–	–	–	–	–	–	–	38	38
55	(China) Song Chaoqing	0	0	0	2	30	0	4	–	–	–	36
56	(Kazakhstan) Elena Khrustaleva	0	4	28	1	0	–	3	–	–	–	36
57	(Romania) Dana Plotogea	0	0	0	9	0	2	25	~~0~~	0	0	36
58	(Ukraine) Lilia Vaygina-Efremova	0	10	7	19	–	0	0	–	–	–	36
59	(Estonia) Kadri Lehtla	0	0	8	0	0	0	13	–	14	–	35
60	(France) Julie Carraz-Collin	10	2	16	5	0	0	–	0	–	–	33
61	(China) Liu Yuan-Yuan	0	0	0	29	3	0	–	0	0	–	32
62	(Czech Republic) Zdenka Vejnarova	0	16	0	0	15	0	–	0	0	–	31
63	(Slovenia) Teja Gregorin	0	6	–	–	16	0	0	0	1	8	31
64	(Italy) Katja Haller	0	0	0	0	0	0	16	0	~~0~~	14	30
65	(China) Kong Yingchao	21	8	0	0	0	–	–	–	–	–	29
66	(Russia) Olga Anisimova	–	–	–	7	0	21	–	–	–	0	28
67	(Kazakhstan) Anna Lebedeva	0	0	13	0	0	–	14	–	–	–	27
68	(Italy) Roberta Fiandino	0	0	–	–	0	25	0	0	–	–	25
69	(Russia) Natalia Sokolova	–	25	–	–	–	–	–	–	–	–	25
70	(Ukraine) Olena Pidrushna	0	0	14	–	0	–	–	–	0	11	25
71	(Belarus) Liudmila Kalinchik	0	~~0~~	0	11	4	10	0	0	0	0	25
72	(Norway) Anne Ingstadbjoerg	0	7	–	–	0	1	–	6	10	–	24
73	(Germany) Sabrina Buchholz	0	0	–	21	0	–	–	–	–	–	21
74	(Latvia) Madara Liduma	16	0	0	0	0	0	0	0	4	–	20
75	(Czech Republic) Veronika Zvaricova	–	–	–	0	–	–	19	–	–	–	19
76	(Romania) Mihaela Purdea	4	13	0	0	~~0~~	0	0	0	0	0	17
77	(Switzerland) Selina Gasparin	–	0	0	12	0	0	0	–	0	0	12
78	(Romania) Alexandra Stoian	0	~~0~~	0	0	0	0	12	0	0	0	12
79	(Italy) Christa Perathoner	–	–	0	–	0	9	0	0	–	–	9
80	(Finland) Teija Kuntola	0	0	0	–	0	0	0	–	9	–	9
81	(Norway) Synnøve Solemdal	–	–	–	–	–	–	–	–	0	7	7
82	(Belarus) Liudmila Ananko	–	0	4	–	–	–	–	–	–	–	4
83	(Slovakia) Martina Halinarova	0	0	0	–	0	3	0	–	–	–	3
84	(United States) Sara Studebaker	–	–	–	–	–	–	–	3	–	–	3
85	(Bulgaria) Pavlina Filipova	0	1	–	0	–	0	0	–	–	–	1
