= 2009–10 Biathlon World Cup – Individual Women =

The 2009–10 Biathlon World Cup – Individual Women started on Wednesday December 2, 2009 in Östersund and finished Thursday February 18, 2009 in Vancouver at the Olympic Biathlon event. Defending titlist is Magdalena Neuner of Germany.

== Competition format ==
The 15 kilometres (9.3 mi) individual race is the oldest biathlon event; the distance is skied over five laps. The biathlete shoots four times at any shooting lane, in the order of prone, standing, prone, standing, totalling 20 targets. For each missed target a fixed penalty time, usually one minute, is added to the skiing time of the biathlete. Competitors' starts are staggered, normally by 30 seconds.

== 2008-09 Top 3 Standings ==
Medal	Athlete	Points
Gold:	(Germany) Magdalena Neuner	129
Silver:	(Romania) Éva Tófalvi	123
Bronze:	(Norway) Tora Berger	122

== Medal winners ==
Event:	Gold:	Time	Silver:	Time	Bronze:	Time
Östersund details	Helena Jonsson; Sweden	43:01.4 (0+0+1+0)	Anna Carin Olofsson-Zidek; Sweden	43:27.6 (0+1+0+1)	Darya Domracheva; Belarus	44:17.8 (0+1+0+1)
Pokljuka details	Helena Jonsson; Sweden	43:04.1 (0+0+0+0)	Anna Carin Olofsson-Zidek; Sweden	43:26.7 (1+0+0+0)	Anastasiya Kuzmina; Slovakia	43:31.4 (1+0+0+0)
Antholz details	Magdalena Neuner; Germany	43:14.4 (0+1+1+1)	Kati Wilhelm; Germany	43:19.9 (0+0+1+0)	Andrea Henkel; Germany	43:41.8 (0+0+0+2)
2010 Winter Olympics details	Tora Berger; Norway	40:52.8 (0+0+0+1)	Elena Khrustaleva; Kazakhstan	41:13.5 (0+0+0+0)	Darya Domracheva; Belarus	41:21.0 (0+1+0+0)

== Standings ==
#	Name	ÖST	POK	ANT	OLY	Total
1	Anna Carin Olofsson-Zidek (SWE)	54	54	–	24	132
2	Andrea Henkel (GER)	~~14~~	40	48	38	126
3	Kati Wilhelm (GER)	24	~~15~~	54	43	121
4	Darya Domracheva (BLR)	48	25	–	48	121
5	Helena Jonsson (SWE)	60	60	–	0	120
6	Magdalena Neuner (GER)	–	23	60	31	114
7	Oksana Khvostenko (UKR)	38	^{26}	31	34	103
8	Valj Semerenko (UKR)	40	34	~~19~~	28	102
9	Marie-Laure Brunet (FRA)	36	~~28~~	30	29	95
10	Iana Romanova (RUS)	20	43	27	0	90
11	Elena Khrustaleva (KAZ)	0	18	16	54	88
12	Olga Medvedtseva (RUS)	32	36	–	20	88
13	Tora Berger (NOR)	27	–	–	60	87
14	Michela Ponza (ITA)	34	0	38	14	86
15	Olena Pidhrushna (UKR)	31	17	29	~~9~~	77
16	Martina Beck (GER)	28	–	36	12	76
17	Anastasiya Kuzmina (SVK)	23	48	–	2	73
18	Agnieszka Cyl (POL)	0	10	25	36	71
19	Natalia Levchenkova (MDA)	30	16	24	~~4~~	70
20	Juliane Doll (GER)	29	7	28	–	64
21	Selina Gasparin (SUI)	0	22	40	1	63
22	Teja Gregorin (SLO)	0	32	26	5	63
23	Andreja Mali (SLO)	19	0	22	22	63
24	Olga Zaitseva (RUS)	0	–	43	15	58
25	Vita Semerenko (UKR)	21	~~5~~	18	19	58
26	Simone Hauswald (GER)	9	14	32	–	55
27	Weronika Nowakowska (POL)	0	0	14	40	54
28	Anna Bogaliy-Titovets (RUS)	–	38	–	16	54
29	Éva Tófalvi (ROU)	–	0	21	30	51
30	Sylvie Becaert (FRA)	4	0	34	11	49
31	Song Chaoqing (CHN)	18	29	–	0	47
32	Katja Haller (ITA)	5	~~3~~	17	23	45
33	Svetlana Sleptsova (RUS)	43	–	–	–	43
34	Liudmila Kalinchik (BLR)	0	11	–	32	43
35	Marie Dorin (FRA)	0	31	12	0	43
36	Krystyna Pałka (POL)	13	0	1	26	40
37	Julie Carraz-Collin (FRA)	1	30	7	–	38
38	Olga Kudrashova (BLR)	11	0	–	25	36
39	Dijana Ravnikar (SLO)	25	0	0	6	31
40	Natalya Burdyga (RUS)	12	19	–	–	31
41	Olga Nazarova (BLR)	0	27	–	–	27
42	Ann Kristin Flatland (NOR)	–	–	–	27	27
43	Kaisa Mäkäräinen (FIN)	26	0	–	0	26
44	Nadezhda Skardino (BLR)	0	13	–	13	26
45	Mihaela Purdea (ROU)	16	0	9	0	25
46	Dong Xue (CHN)	0	24	–	–	24
47	Karin Oberhofer (ITA)	–	0	23	0	23
48	Fuyuko Suzuki (JPN)	22	0	0	0	22
49	Wang Chunli (CHN)	6	8	–	8	22
50	Liv Kjersti Eikeland (NOR)	0	21	–	0	21
51	Liu Xianying (CHN)	–	–	–	21	21
52	Diana Rasimovičiūtė (LTU)	10	–	–	11	21
53	Haley Johnson (USA)	0	20	0	0	20
54	Tadeja Brankovič-Likozar (SLO)	–	–	20	0	20
55	Lanny Barnes (USA)	0	0	0	18	18
56	Madara Liduma (LAT)	17	0	0	0	17
57	Anna Maria Nilsson (SWE)	0	0	–	0	17
58	Sandrine Bailly (FRA)	15	–	–	0	15
59	Magda Rezlerová (CZE)	0	0	15	0	15
60	Tina Bachmann (GER)	–	0	13	–	13
61	Anais Bescond (FRA)	–	12	0	–	12
62	Veronika Vítková (CZE)	–	–	11	0	11
63	Kathrin Hitzer (GER)	2	9	–	–	11
64	Ekaterina Yurlova (CZE)	–	–	10	–	10
65	Martina Halinárová (SVK)	0	0	8	0	8
66	Nina Klenovska (BUL)	8	0	–	0	8
67	Kong Yingchao (CHN)	7	1	–	0	8
68	Sara Studebaker (USA)	0	0	0	7	7
69	Magdalena Gwizdon (POL)	0	0	6	0	6
70	Megan Tandy (CAN)	0	6	–	0	6
71	Kari Henneseid Eie (NOR)	–	0	5	–	5
72	Jana Gerekova (SVK)	4	0	0	0	4
73	Reka Ferencz (ROU)	–	4	–	0	4
74	Laure Soulie (AND)	–	–	4	–	4
75	Anna Lebedeva (KAZ)	0	–	0	3	3
76	Jenny Jonsson (SWE)	0	0	3	–	3
77	Zina Kocher (CAN)	0	2	0	0	2
78	Mun Ji-Hee (KOR)	0	0	2	0	2
