= 2009–10 Biathlon World Cup – Pursuit Women =

The 2009–10 Biathlon World Cup – Pursuit Women will start at Saturday December 13, 2009 in Hochfilzen and will finish Saturday March 20, 2010 in Oslo. Defending titlist is Kati Wilhelm of Germany.

== Competition format ==
This is a pursuit competition. The biathletes' starts are separated by their time differences from a previous race, most commonly a sprint race. The contestants ski a distance of 10 kilometres (6.2 mi) over five laps. On four of the laps, the contestants shoot at targets; each miss requires the contestant to ski a penalty loop of 150 metres (490 ft). There are two prone shooting bouts and two standing bouts, in that order. The contestant crossing the finish line first is the winner.

To prevent awkward and/or dangerous crowding of the skiing loops, and overcapacity at the shooting range, World Cup Pursuits are held with only the 60 top ranking biathletes after the preceding race. The biathletes shoot (on a first-come, first-served basis) at the lane corresponding to the position they arrived for all shooting bouts.

Points are awarded for each event, according to each contestant's finish. When all events are completed. the contestant with the highest number of points is declared the season winner.

== 2008–09 Top 3 Standings ==
Medal	Athlete	Points
Gold:	(Germany) Kati Wilhelm	272
Silver:	(Norway) Tora Berger	246
Bronze:	(Germany) Martina Beck	244

== Medal winners ==
Event:	Gold:	Time	Silver:	Time	Bronze:	Time
Hochfilzen details	Helena Jonsson; Sweden	34:09.1 (0+1+0+0)	Svetlana Sleptsova; Russia	34:40.8 (0+0+1+1)	Olga Zaitseva; Russia	34:45.1 (1+1+0+0)
Pokljuka details	Svetlana Sleptsova; Russia	34:03.2 (0+1+0+1)	Magdalena Neuner; Germany	34:39.5 (1+1+1+0)	Anna Bogaliy-Titovets; Russia	34:46.4 (0+1+1+0)
Antholz details	Andrea Henkel; Germany	30:59.8 (1+0+0+0)	Magdalena Neuner; Germany	31:23.1 (1+0+2+1)	Ann Kristin Flatland; Norway	31:44.7 (1+0+0+0)
2010 Winter Olympics details	Magdalena Neuner; Germany	30:16.0 (0+0+1+1)	Anastasiya Kuzmina; Slovakia	30:28.3 (0+1+1+0)	Marie-Laure Brunet; France	30:44.3 (0+0+0+0)
Kontiolahti details	Darya Domracheva; Belarus	31:32.6 (0+0+1+0)	Magdalena Neuner; Germany	31:44.7 (0+0+2+1)	Simone Hauswald; Germany	31:50.7 (0+0+0+1)
Oslo details	Simone Hauswald; Germany	32:05.5 (2+0+0+1)	Darya Domracheva; Belarus	32:10.9 (0+0+0+1)	Anna Carin Olofsson-Zidek; Sweden	32:45.3 (0+0+0+2)

== Standings ==
#	Name	HOC	POK	ANT	OLY	KON	OSL	Total
1	Magdalena Neuner (GER)	~~13~~	54	54	60	54	34	256
2	Simone Hauswald (GER)	36	30	43	~~25~~	48	60	217
3	Olga Zaitseva (RUS)	48	–	40	36	40	43	207
4	Darya Domracheva (BLR)	21	38	–	26	60	54	199
5	Andrea Henkel (GER)	38	31	60	31	34	~~19~~	194
6	Anna Carin Olofsson-Zidek (SWE)	34	34	–	43	28	48	187
7	Helena Jonsson (SWE)	60	36	–	27	32	27	182
8	Svetlana Sleptsova (RUS)	54	60	12	23	–	31	180
9	Teja Gregorin (SLO)	25	40	32	32	~~15~~	30	159
10	Marie-Laure Brunet (FRA)	18	–	29	48	19	38	152
11	Kati Wilhelm (GER)	23	32	~~18~~	29	38	29	151
12	Anna Boulygina (RUS)	~~15~~	24	19	38	31	24	136
13	Zina Kocher (CAN)	20	43	27	–	29	12	131
14	Valj Semerenko (UKR)	–	20	34	18	43	10	125
15	Anastasiya Kuzmina (SVK)	40	3	24	54	–	–	121
16	Tina Bachmann (GER)	31	22	31	–	9	23	116
17	Sylvie Becaert (FRA)	22	21	38	12	18	~~6~~	111
18	Vita Semerenko (UKR)	16	28	15	0	30	22	111
19	Marie Dorin (FRA)	12	~~8~~	30	24	24	21	111
20	Ann Kristin Flatland (NOR)	10	–	48	34	–	15	107
21	Sandrine Bailly (FRA)	30	25	36	14	–	–	105
22	Anna Bogaliy-Titovets (RUS)	–	48	–	–	14	40	102
23	Martina Beck (GER)	43	–	–	–	22	36	101
24	Tora Berger (NOR)	32	–	–	40	26	3	101
25	Liudmila Kalinchik (BLR)	28	–	–	28	16	26	98
26	Agnieszka Cyl (POL)	11	27	25	16	~~6~~	16	95
27	Nadezhda Skardino (BLR)	29	26	–	15	–	17	87
28	Kaisa Mäkäräinen (FIN)	19	29	–	0	27	9	84
29	Éva Tófalvi (ROU)	–	16	7	22	7	25	77
30	Iana Romanova (RUS)	6	–	13	–	25	32	76
31	Oksana Khvostenko (UKR)	–	–	17	19	36	–	72
32	Olena Pidhrushna (UKR)	–	1	10	20	23	18	72
33	Olga Medvedtseva (RUS)	24	23	3	21	–	–	71
34	Selina Gasparin (SUI)	–	–	23	0	–	28	51
35	Weronika Nowakowska (POL)	–	0	9	13	20	8	50
36	Juliane Doll (GER)	9	17	21	–	–	–	47
37	Katja Haller (ITA)	–	0	28	0	11	5	44
38	Lilia Vaygina-Efremova (UKR)	17	15	–	–	12	–	44
39	Kong Yingchao (CHN)	27	13	–	–	–	–	40
40	Julie Carraz-Collin (FRA)	3	14	20	–	3	–	40
41	Magdalena Gwizdoń (POL)	–	18	11	10	–	–	39
42	Wang Chunli (CHN)	26	–	–	6	–	–	32
43	Elena Khrustaleva (KAZ)	0	–	1	30	–	–	31
44	Karin Oberhofer (ITA)	–	0	6	0	10	14	30
45	Anais Bescond (FRA)	–	–	26	–	1	–	27
46	Dijana Ravnikar (SLO)	0	–	5	2	0	20	27
47	Song Chaoqing (CHN)	7	19	–	0	–	–	26
48	Anna Lebedeva (KAZ)	–	–	22	0	–	0	22
49	Kathrin Hitzer (GER)	–	–	–	–	21	0	21
50	Madara Līduma (LTU)	–	0	–	3	17	–	20
51	Zdenka Vejnarova (CZE)	0	11	8	0	0	0	19
52	Krystyna Pałka (POL)	–	–	0	17	–	–	17
53	Olga Kudrashova (BLR)	2	–	–	–	8	7	17
54	Tadeja Brankovič-Likozar (SLO)	–	–	16	–	–	–	16
55	Ekaterina Yurlova (RUS)	–	–	–	–	13	2	15
56	Liu Xianying (CHN)	–	4	–	11	–	–	15
57	Natalia Levchenkova (MDA)	0	–	14	0	–	–	14
58	Natalya Burdyga (RUS)	14	–	–	–	–	–	14
59	Jana Gerekova (SVK)	–	0	–	1	0	13	14
60	Elisabeth Högberg (SWE)	4	9	–	–	0	–	13
61	Megan Tandy (CAN)	–	6	–	5	2	0	13
62	Sofia Domeij (SWE)	–	12	–	0	0	0	12
63	Synnøve Solemdal (NOR)	–	–	–	–	–	11	11
64	Kadri Lehtla (EST)	–	5	–	–	5	1	11
65	Marina Lebedeva (KAZ)	0	10	0	0	–	–	10
66	Magda Rezlerova (CZE)	0	0	0	9	–	–	9
67	Mari Laukkanen (FIN)	–	7	2	–	–	–	9
68	Andreja Mali (SLO)	0	–	–	8	0	–	8
69	Solveig Rogstad (NOR)	8	–	–	–	–	–	8
70	Diana Rasimovičiūtė (LTU)	–	–	–	7	–	0	7
71	Veronika Vítková (CZE)	–	2	–	4	–	–	6
72	Anna Maria Nilsson (SWE)	5	–	–	0	0	–	5
73	Laure Soulie (AND)	–	–	–	–	–	4	4
74	Michela Ponza (POL)	–	–	4	0	–	–	4
75	Jenny Jonsson (SWE)	–	–	–	–	4	–	4
76	Paulina Bobak (POL)	–	0	1	–	–	–	1
77	Liv Kjersti Eikeland (NOR)	1	–	–	–	0	–	1
