= Biathlon World Championships 2011 – Mixed relay =

Mixed relay at the Biathlon World Championships 2011
- Date: 3 March 2011
- Competitors: 104 from 26 nations
- Winning time: 1:14:22.5

Medalists
| gold medal | Tora Berger; Ann Kristin Aafedt Flatland; Ole Einar Bjørndalen; Tarjei Bø | Norway |
| silver medal | Andrea Henkel; Magdalena Neuner; Arnd Peiffer; Michael Greis | Germany |
| bronze medal | Marie-Laure Brunet; Marie Dorin; Alexis Bœuf; Martin Fourcade | France |

The Mixed relay of the Biathlon World Championships 2011 was held on March 3, 2011 at 16:30 local time. 26 nations participated. The two participating women athletes raced over 2 × 6 km, while the men's distance was 2 × 7.5 km.

== Results ==
| Rank | Bib | Team | Time | Penalties (P+S) | Deficit |
|---|---|---|---|---|---|
| 1st place, gold medalist(s) | 2 | Norway; Tora Berger; Ann Kristin Aafedt Flatland; Ole Einar Bjørndalen; Tarjei Bø | 1:14:22.5; 18:18.3; 18:16.4; 19:05.5; 18:42.3 | 0+4 0+3; 0+1 0+0; 0+1 0+1; 0+2 0+1; 0+0 0+1 | |
| 2nd place, silver medalist(s) | 1 | Germany; Andrea Henkel; Magdalena Neuner; Arnd Peiffer; Michael Greis | 1:14:45.4; 18:45.0; 17:25.0; 19:06.3; 19:29.1 | 0+5 0+3; 0+2 0+0; 0+0 0+0; 0+1 0+2; 0+2 0+1 | +22.9 |
| 3rd place, bronze medalist(s) | 4 | France; Marie-Laure Brunet; Marie Dorin; Alexis Bœuf; Martin Fourcade | 1:15:38.7; 19:36.5; 18:27.7; 19:14.8; 18:19.7 | 0+2 0+6; 0+2 0+2; 0+0 0+3; 0+0 0+1; 0+0 0+0 | +1:16.2 |
| 4 | 5 | Sweden; Helena Ekholm; Anna Carin Olofsson-Zidek; Björn Ferry; Carl Johan Bergman | 1:15:58.3; 18:44.1; 19:13.2; 19:03.5; 18:57.5 | 0+2 1+8; 0+2 0+2; 0+0 1+3; 0+0 0+0; 0+0 0+3 | +1:35.8 |
| 5 | 7 | Italy; Michela Ponza; Katja Haller; Christian De Lorenzi; Lukas Hofer | 1:16:17.6; 18:43.3; 18:53.5; 19:49.0; 18:51.8 | 0+4 0+5; 0+1 0+0; 0+0 0+0; 0+2 0+3; 0+1 0+2 | +1:55.1 |
| 6 | 3 | Russia; Svetlana Sleptsova; Olga Zaitseva; Evgeny Ustyugov; Ivan Tcherezov | 1:17:30.9; 20:49.4; 18:36.5; 19:14.0; 18:51.0 | 1+5 2+6; 1+3 1+3; 0+0 1+3; 0+0 0+0; 0+2 0+0 | +3:08.4 |
| 7 | 13 | Austria; Iris Waldhuber; Ramona Düringer; Dominik Landertinger; Christoph Sumann | 1:17:39.5; 19:36.8; 18:58.9; 19:29.9; 19:33.9 | 0+4 1+6; 0+1 0+0; 0+1 0+2; 0+0 0+1; 0+2 1+3 | +3:17.0 |
| 8 | 6 | Ukraine; Oksana Khvostenko; Vita Semerenko; Olexander Bilanenko; Serhiy Semenov | 1:17:42.9; 20:15.1; 19:01.8; 19:34.5; 18:51.5 | 1+4 1+5; 1+3 0+0; 0+0 1+3; 0+1 0+2; 0+0 0+0 | +3:20.4 |
| 9 | 17 | Finland; Mari Laukkanen; Kaisa Mäkäräinen; Paavo Puurunen; Timo Antila | 1:17:46.7; 19:26.6; 17:42.6; 19:52.9; 20:44.6 | 0+3 1+7; 0+1 0+2; 0+0 0+0; 0+0 0+2; 0+2 1+3 | +3:24.2 |
| 10 | 8 | Belarus; Nadezhda Skardino; Darya Domracheva; Sergey Novikov; Evgeny Abramenko | 1:18:16.8; 19:25.2; 17:45.6; 20:24.1; 20:41.9 | 0+3 1+7; 0+0 0+2; 0+0 0+1; 0+1 0+1; 0+2 1+3 | +3:54.3 |
| 11 | 10 | Czech Republic; Veronika Vítková; Gabriela Soukalová; Zdeněk Vítek; Ondřej Moravec | 1:18:29.6; 20:16.2; 18:34.1; 20:34.5; 19:04.8 | 0+7 0+5; 0+3 0+1; 0+2 0+1; 0+2 0+3; 0+0 0+0 | +4:07.1 |
| 12 | 14 | Slovakia; Anastasiya Kuzmina; Jana Gereková; Miroslav Matiaško; Pavol Hurajt | 1:19:27.3; 18:34.8; 19:31.8; 21:13.0; 20:07.7 | 1+8 0+8; 0+1 0+1; 1+3 0+3; 0+2 0+2; 0+2 0+2 | +5:04.8 |
| 13 | 12 | United States; Sara Studebaker; Laura Spector; Jay Hakkinen; Leif Nordgren | 1:19:33.6; 20:09.6; 19:59.8; 20:07.5; 19:16.7 | 0+8 0+6; 0+3 0+2; 0+2 0+2; 0+1 0+0; 0+2 0+2 | +5:11.1 |
| 14 | 16 | Estonia; Kadri Lehtla; Eveli Saue; Indrek Tobreluts; Kauri Kõiv | 1:19:39.2; 20:10.9; 18:43.1; 20:42.5; 20:02.7 | 0+5 1+8; 0+3 0+1; 0+1 0+1; 0+1 1+3; 0+0 0+3 | +5:16.7 |
| 15 | 18 | Switzerland; Selina Gasparin; Elisa Gasparin; Thomas Frei; Christian Stebler | 1:19:50.0; 19:20.5; 19:20.5; 20:36.1; 20:03.1 | 1+4 0+10; 0+0 0+3; 0+0 0+2; 0+1 0+2; 1+3 0+3 | +5:27.5 |
| 16 | 11 | Poland; Agnieszka Cyl; Magdalena Gwizdoń; Krzysztof Plywaczyk; Mirosław Kobus | 1:21:27.9; 19:30.2; 19:06.5; 21:52.2; 20:59.0 | 1+5 0+4; 0+0 0+1; 0+1 0+2; 1+3 0+0; 0+1 0+1 | +7:05.4 |
| 17 | 20 | Latvia; Madara Līduma; Žanna Juškāne; Ilmārs Bricis; Edgars Piksons | LAP; 20:59.0; 21:02.1; 20:11.6 | 0+2 1+10; 0+0 1+3; 0+2 0+1; 0+0 0+3; 0+0 0+3 | |
| 18 | 25 | Great Britain; Amanda Lightfoot; Adele Walker; Lee-Steve Jackson; Pete Beyer | LAP; 21:22.9; 19:53.3; 20:02.1 | 1+4 0+6; 1+3 0+1; 0+1 0+1; 0+0 0+1; 0+0 0+3 | |
| 19 | 21 | China; Tang Jialin; Xu Yinghui; Ren Long; Li Zhonghai | LAP; 19:36.1; 21:20.8; 20:53.5 | 0+5 1+9; 0+3 0+1; 0+1 1+3; 0+0 0+2; 0+1 0+3 | |
| 20 | 22 | Japan; Fuyuko Suzuki; Itsuka Owada; Kazuya Inomata; Satoru Abe | LAP; 21:43.6; 19:31.1; 20:42.3 | 0+4 2+8; 0+3 2+3; 0+1 0+2; 0+1 0+0; 0+0 0+3 | |
| 21 | 19 | Kazakhstan; Marina Lebedeva; Elena Khrustaleva; Alexandr Trifonov; Alexsandr Chervyhkov | LAP; 20:19.8; 20:15.8; 22:22.7 | 1+6 0+7; 0+2 0+3; 0+1 0+2; 1+3 0+2; 0+0 0+0 | |
| 22 | 23 | Romania; Éva Tófalvi; Réka Ferencz; Roland Gerbacea; Remus Faur | LAP; 18:56.8; 19:59.2; 22:33.1 | 0+8 1+3; 0+0 0+0; 0+3 0+0; 0+3 1+3; 0+2 0+0 | |
| 23 | 26 | Lithuania; Diana Rasimovičiūtė; Aliona Sosunova; Aleksandr Lavrinovič; Karolis Zlatkauskas | LAP; 20:00.9; 20:58.8; 22:42.0 | 1+6 0+3; 0+1 0+0; 0+0 0+3; 1+3 0+0; 0+2 0+0 | |
| 24 | 15 | Bulgaria; Niya Dimitrova; Desislava Stoyanova; Miroslav Kenanov; Martin Bogdanov | LAP; 21:21.5; 22:05.2; 21:09.7 | 4+8 0+7; 1+3 0+3; 3+3 0+2; 0+1 0+1; 0+1 0+1 | |
| 25 | 24 | South Korea; Mun Ji-hee; Kim Seo-ra; Jun Je-uk; Lee Jung-sik | LAP; 21:01.4; 21:52.1; 20:56.3 | 1+5 2+11; 0+1 1+3; 0+1 0+3; 0+0 0+2; 1+3 1+3 | |
| | 9 | Slovenia; Teja Gregorin; Andreja Mali; Janez Marič; Klemen Bauer | DSQ | | |
