= Biathlon at the 2007 Asian Winter Games – Men's individual =

Men's 20 kilometre individual at the 2007 Asian Winter Games
- Venue: Beida Lake Skiing Resort
- Dates: 1 February 2007
- Competitors: 17 from 5 nations

Medalists
gold medal	Alexandr Chervyakov	Kazakhstan
silver medal	Zhang Qing	China
bronze medal	Hidenori Isa	Japan

The men's 20 kilometre individual at the 2007 Asian Winter Games was held on 1 February 2007 at Beida Lake Skiing Resort, China.

== Schedule ==
All times are China Standard Time (UTC+08:00)

Date	Time	Event
Thursday, 1 February 2007	12:30	Final

== Results ==
Legend

- DNF — Did not finish

Rank	Athlete	Ski time	Penalties					Time
Rank	Athlete	Ski time	P	S	P	S	Total	Time
1st place, gold medalist(s)	Alexandr Chervyakov (KAZ)	1:02:45.0	1	2	0	1	4	1:06:45.0
2nd place, silver medalist(s)	Zhang Qing (CHN)	1:04:10.5	1	0	1	1	3	1:07:10.5
3rd place, bronze medalist(s)	Hidenori Isa (JPN)	1:03:28.6	1	1	0	2	4	1:07:28.6
4	Tian Ye (CHN)	1:04:39.0	0	1	2	0	3	1:07:39.0
5	Zhang Chengye (CHN)	1:03:11.7	2	2	0	2	6	1:09:11.7
6	Lee In-bok (KOR)	1:07:23.6	0	1	0	2	3	1:10:23.6
7	Tatsumi Kasahara (JPN)	1:04:24.6	2	2	1	1	6	1:10:24.6
8	Yerden Abdrakhmanov (KAZ)	1:05:31.0	2	1	1	1	5	1:10:31.0
9	Chen Haibin (CHN)	1:05:41.9	1	1	1	2	5	1:10:41.9
10	Sergey Naumik (KAZ)	1:04:43.2	2	3	0	1	6	1:10:43.2
11	Yoshiyuki Asari (JPN)	1:05:11.6	1	3	1	2	7	1:12:11.6
12	Shinya Saito (JPN)	1:05:35.5	2	1	3	1	7	1:12:35.5
13	Alexandr Trifonov (KAZ)	1:06:35.3	3	1	1	3	8	1:14:35.3
14	Jun Je-uk (KOR)	1:10:10.3	2	4	0	2	8	1:18:10.3
15	Park Byung-joo (KOR)	1:07:21.2	3	3	3	3	12	1:19:21.2
16	Lee Jung-sik (KOR)	1:11:02.4	4	2	5	1	12	1:23:02.4
—	Salamat Dzhumaliev (KGZ)		4					DNF
