= Biathlon at the 2007 Asian Winter Games – Men's sprint =

Men's 10 kilometre sprint at the 2007 Asian Winter Games
- Venue: Beida Lake Skiing Resort
- Dates: 29 January 2007
- Competitors: 19 from 7 nations

Medalists
gold medal	Hidenori Isa	Japan
silver medal	Zhang Chengye	China
bronze medal	Zhang Qing	China

The men's 10 kilometre sprint at the 2007 Asian Winter Games was held on 29 January 2007 at Beida Lake Skiing Resort, China.

== Schedule ==
All times are China Standard Time (UTC+08:00)

Date	Time	Event
Monday, 29 January 2007	12:00	Final

== Results ==
Rank	Athlete	Penalties			Time
Rank	Athlete	P	S	Total	Time
1st place, gold medalist(s)	Hidenori Isa (JPN)	0	0	0	29:35.6
2nd place, silver medalist(s)	Zhang Chengye (CHN)	1	3	4	29:43.3
3rd place, bronze medalist(s)	Zhang Qing (CHN)	0	1	1	30:28.8
4	Tatsumi Kasahara (JPN)	1	2	3	30:51.0
5	Tian Ye (CHN)	0	2	2	30:56.7
6	Sergey Naumik (KAZ)	1	1	2	31:23.9
7	Ren Long (CHN)	1	2	3	31:56.2
8	Yoshiyuki Asari (JPN)	1	3	4	32:06.0
9	Shinya Saito (JPN)	3	2	5	32:12.2
10	Alexandr Chervyakov (KAZ)	3	3	6	32:57.9
11	Lee In-bok (KOR)	1	3	4	33:18.7
12	Park Yoon-bae (KOR)	1	2	3	33:35.3
13	Park Byung-joo (KOR)	4	2	6	34:00.1
14	Alexandr Trifonov (KAZ)	3	5	8	34:17.6
15	Alexandr Shesler (KAZ)	3	3	6	34:17.9
16	Jun Je-uk (KOR)	1	3	4	34:20.5
17	Otgonbayaryn Ankhbayar (MGL)	2	3	5	41:11.5
18	Salamat Dzhumaliev (KGZ)	2	4	6	47:35.0
19	Liu Yung-chien (TPE)	4	2	6	50:37.8
