= Biathlon at the 2007 Asian Winter Games – Men's relay =

Men's 4 × 7.5 kilometre relay at the 2007 Asian Winter Games
- Venue: Beida Lake Skiing Resort
- Dates: 2 February 2007
- Competitors: 16 from 4 nations

Medalists
| gold medal | China; Zhang Qing, Ren Long, Zhang Chengye, Tian Ye |
| silver medal | Japan; Tatsumi Kasahara, Hidenori Isa, Yoshiyuki Asari, Shinya Saito |
| bronze medal | Kazakhstan; Sergey Naumik, Alexandr Trifonov, Yerden Abdrakhmanov, Alexandr Chervyakov |

The men's 4×7.5 kilometre relay at the 2007 Asian Winter Games was held on 2 February 2007 at Beida Lake Skiing Resort, China.

== Schedule ==
All times are China Standard Time (UTC+08:00)

| Date | Time | Event |
|---|---|---|
| Friday, 2 February 2007 | 12:30 | Final |

== Results ==
| Rank | Team | Penalties | | | Time |
| Rank | Team | P | S | Total | Time |
|---|---|---|---|---|---|
| 1st place, gold medalist(s) | China (CHN) | 6+9 | 2+11 | 8+20 | 1:35:51.5 |
| | Zhang Qing | 0+0 | 0+2 | 0+2 | 21:45.4 |
| | Ren Long | 4+3 | 0+3 | 4+6 | 26:45.3 |
| | Zhang Chengye | 1+3 | 2+3 | 3+6 | 23:17.9 |
| | Tian Ye | 1+3 | 0+3 | 1+6 | 24:02.9 |
| 2nd place, silver medalist(s) | Japan (JPN) | 4+9 | 2+11 | 6+20 | 1:36:35.9 |
| | Tatsumi Kasahara | 0+2 | 0+2 | 0+4 | 22:37.7 |
| | Hidenori Isa | 1+3 | 0+3 | 1+6 | 25:10.3 |
| | Yoshiyuki Asari | 0+1 | 2+3 | 2+4 | 24:20.3 |
| | Shinya Saito | 3+3 | 0+3 | 3+6 | 24:27.6 |
| 3rd place, bronze medalist(s) | Kazakhstan (KAZ) | 3+12 | 8+10 | 11+22 | 1:39:26.7 |
| | Sergey Naumik | 1+3 | 4+3 | 5+6 | 25:02.8 |
| | Alexandr Trifonov | 2+3 | 0+3 | 2+6 | 24:07.6 |
| | Yerden Abdrakhmanov | 0+3 | 4+3 | 4+6 | 27:05.0 |
| | Alexandr Chervyakov | 0+3 | 0+1 | 0+4 | 23:11.3 |
| 4 | South Korea (KOR) | 17+12 | 7+10 | 24+22 | 1:52:35.3 |
| | Park Yoon-bae | 5+3 | 3+3 | 8+6 | 29:00.9 |
| | Lee In-bok | 4+3 | 2+3 | 6+6 | 28:48.1 |
| | Park Byung-joo | 5+3 | 2+3 | 7+6 | 29:02.2 |
| | Jun Je-uk | 3+3 | 0+1 | 3+4 | 25:44.1 |
