= Biathlon World Championships 2012 – Men's relay =

Men's relay at the Biathlon World Championships 2012
- Date: 9 March 2012
- Competitors: 116 from 29 nations
- Winning time: 1:17:26.8

Medalists
gold medal	Ole Einar Bjørndalen; Rune Brattsveen; Tarjei Bø; Emil Hegle Svendsen	Norway
silver medal	Jean-Guillaume Béatrix; Simon Fourcade; Alexis Bœuf; Martin Fourcade	France
bronze medal	Simon Schempp; Andreas Birnbacher; Michael Greis; Arnd Peiffer	Germany

The men's relay competition of the Biathlon World Championships 2012 was held on March 9, 2012 at 15:15 local time.

== Results ==
The race was started at 15:15.

Rank	Bib	Team	Time	Penalties (P+S)	Deficit
1st place, gold medalist(s)	5	Norway; Ole Einar Bjørndalen; Rune Brattsveen; Tarjei Bø; Emil Hegle Svendsen	1:17:26.8; 20:13.5; 19:19.5; 19:02.4; 18:51.4	0+1 1+6; 0+0 1+3; 0+0 0+2; 0+1 0+1; 0+0 0+0	
2nd place, silver medalist(s)	2	France; Jean-Guillaume Béatrix; Simon Fourcade; Alexis Bœuf; Martin Fourcade	1:17:56.5; 19:23.4; 19:35.1; 19:18.1; 19:39.9	0+5 0+5; 0+1 0+1; 0+1 0+1; 0+1 0+0; 0+2 0+3	+29.7
3rd place, bronze medalist(s)	3	Germany; Simon Schempp; Andreas Birnbacher; Michael Greis; Arnd Peiffer	1:18:19.8; 19:33.6; 19:35.8; 19:34.0; 19:36.4	0+4 0+6; 0+0 0+1; 0+1 0+3; 0+2 0+0; 0+1 0+2	+53.0
4	7	Italy; Christian de Lorenzi; Markus Windisch; Dominik Windisch; Lukas Hofer	1:18:55.7; 20:08.6; 19:25.1; 19:54.3; 19:27.7	0+5 0+5; 0+2 0+1; 0+1 0+2; 0+2 0+1; 0+0 0+1	+1:28.9
5	6	Austria; Simon Eder; Christoph Sumann; Daniel Mesotitsch; Dominik Landertinger	1:19:05.7; 19:48.8; 19:57.9; 19:19.0; 20:00.0	0+1 0+2; 0+0 0+0; 0+1 0+0; 0+0 0+0; 0+0 0+2	+1:38.9
6	1	Russia; Anton Shipulin; Andrei Makoveev; Evgeniy Garanichev; Dmitry Malyshko	1:19:10.9; 19:21.9; 19:37.2; 20:18.0; 19:53.8	0+7 1+5; 0+1 0+1; 0+1 0+1; 0+2 1+3; 0+3 0+0	+1:44.1
7	13	Switzerland; Ivan Joller; Benjamin Weger; Claudio Böckli; Simon Hallenbarter	1:19:27.2; 20:13.2; 19:19.4; 20:18.9; 19:35.7	0+7 0+6; 0+2 0+2; 0+2 0+0; 0+3 0+3; 0+0 0+1	+2:00.4
8	10	Ukraine; Serhiy Semenov; Serguei Sednev; Artem Pryma; Andriy Deryzemlya	1:19:53.6; 19:23.1; 20:11.1; 20:18.1; 20:01.3	0+2 0+7; 0+0 0+0; 0+0 0+3; 0+1 0+2; 0+1 0+2	+2:26.8
9	11	Czech Republic; Michal Šlesingr; Zdeněk Vítek; Jaroslav Soukup; Ondřej Moravec	1:20:15.0; 19:27.5; 21:37.1; 19:27.5; 19:42.9	0+2 3+7; 0+1 0+2; 0+0 3+3; 0+0 0+1; 0+1 0+1	+2:48.2
10	12	United States; Lowell Bailey; Jay Hakkinen; Tim Burke; Leif Nordgren	1:20:32.9; 19:35.8; 20:37.3; 19:59.5; 20:20.3	0+5 0+9; 0+0 0+1; 0+3 0+3; 0+2 0+2; 0+0 0+3	+3:06.1
11	8	Belarus; Sergey Novikov; Aliaksandr Babchyn; Vladimir Alenishko; Evgeny Abramenko	1:20:36.1; 20:13.5; 20:13.4; 20:10.9; 19:58.3	0+5 0+4; 0+2 0+1; 0+2 0+1; 0+0 0+2; 0+1 0+0	+3:09.3
12	15	Slovakia; Dušan Šimočko; Matej Kazar; Martin Otcenas; Pavol Hurajt	1:20:36.3; 19:48.2; 19:51.7; 20:36.6; 20:19.8	0+6 0+6; 0+1 0+0; 0+3 0+2; 0+2 0+3; 0+0 0+1	+3:09.5
13	20	Canada; Marc-André Bedard; Jean-Philippe Leguellec; Scott Perras; Nathan Smith	1:20:47.2; 20:48.9; 19:37.5; 19:58.1; 20:22.7	1+6 0+4; 1+3 0+1; 0+0 0+1; 0+2 0+1; 0+1 0+1	+3:20.4
14	9	Slovenia; Klemen Bauer; Janez Marič; Vasja Rupnik; Peter Dokl	1:21:45.9; 19:30.7; 20:37.9; 20:28.2; 21:09.1	0+5 1+11; 0+1 0+2; 0+3 0+3; 0+1 0+3; 0+0 1+3	+4:19.1
15	24	Kazakhstan; Alexsandr Chervyhkov; Yan Savitskiy; Sergey Naumik; Alexandr Trifonov	1:22:09.3; 20:32.0; 19:59.2; 20:28.8; 21:09.3	0+3 0+8; 0+1 0+2; 0+1 0+1; 0+0 0+3; 0+1 0+2	+4:42.5
16	4	Sweden; Ted Armgren; Björn Ferry; Carl-Johan Bergman; Fredrik Lindström	1:22:16.5; 23:22.5; 20:10.6; 19:18.8; 19:24.6	2+4 1+5; 2+3 1+3; 0+1 0+1; 0+0 0+0; 0+0 0+1	+4:49.7
17	14	Bulgaria; Michail Kletcherov; Miroslav Kenanov; Vladimir Iliev; Krasimir Anev	1:22:40.6; 20:14.4; 21:21.9; 20:49.2; 20:15.1	0+8 0+5; 0+3 0+1; 0+1 0+3; 0+3 0+1; 0+1 0+0	+5:13.8
18	17	Estonia; Kauri Koiv; Indrek Tobreluts; Roland Lessing; Danil Steptsenko	1:23:41.8; 20:25.0; 20:45.0; 20:00.7; 22:31.1	0+3 4+6; 0+0 0+0; 0+0 1+3; 0+0 0+0; 0+3 3+3	+6:15.0
19	19	Latvia; Edgars Piksons; Andrejs Rastorgujevs; Arturs Kolesnikovs; Rolands Puzulis	LAP; 20:17.5; 20:48.6; 22:08.8	0+5 1+6; 0+1 0+0; 0+3 0+3; 0+1 1+3; 0+0 0+0	
20	23	Finland; Jarkko Kauppinen; Timo Antila; Ahti Toivanen; Ville Simola	LAP; 20:36.2; 21:56.7; 21:04.4	2+6 2+11; 0+0 1+3; 1+3 1+3; 1+3 0+2; 0+0 0+3	
21	21	Lithuania; Tomas Kaukėnas; Karol Dombrovski; Karolis Zlatkauskas; Aleksandr Lavrinovic	LAP; 20:25.6; 21:12.2; 22:12.9	0+5 1+7; 0+1 0+1; 0+0 0+2; 0+3 1+3; 0+1 0+1	
22	18	Poland; Krzysztof Plywaczyk; Tomasz Sikora; Adam Kwak; Lukasz Szczurek	LAP; 21:23.4; 20:09.9; 22:16.2	2+6 2+7; 1+3 0+1; 0+0 0+0; 1+3 0+3; 0+0 2+3	
23	16	Japan; Junji Nagai; Kazuya Inomata; Hidenori Isa; Ryo Tsunoda	LAP; 21:46.7; 21:12.1; 20:27.6	2+7 3+9; 1+3 1+3; 0+0 0+3; 0+1 0+0; 1+3 2+3	
24	26	China; Chen Haibin; Li Zhonghai; Ren Long; Zhang Chengye	LAP; 21:32.5; 21:35.8; 21:47.7	0+5 0+9; 0+0 0+3; 0+2 0+2; 0+3 0+1; 0+0 0+3	
25	25	Serbia; Milanko Petrović; Damir Rastić; Edin Hodzić; Emir Hrkalović	LAP; 21:08.0; 21:42.2; 22:43.3	0+7 0+8; 0+2 0+1; 0+1 0+3; 0+1 0+1; 0+3 0+3	
26	28	Belgium; Thorsten Langer; Pascal Langer; Thierry Langer; Vincent Naveau	LAP; 22:10.6; 23:19.5; 22:26.5	1+6 0+3; 0+1 0+0; 1+3 0+2; 0+1 0+1; 0+1 0+0	
27	27	South Korea; Jun Je-uk; Lee In-bok; Kim Yong-gyu; Kim Jong-min	LAP; 22:16.1; 22:18.7; 23:03.1	3+10 1+7; 2+3 0+0; 0+2 0+3; 0+2 1+3; 1+3 0+1	
28	22	Great Britain; Lee-Steve Jackson; Pete Beyer; Marcel Laponder; Ben Woolley	LAP; 20:53.2; 22:49.4; 22:12.8	0+7 3+7; 0+3 0+0; 0+1 0+2; 0+2 0+2; 0+1 3+3	
29	29	Croatia; Jurica Veverec; Tomislav Crnković; Zvonimir Tadejević; Dino Butković	LAP; 24:00.9; 25:57.4; 26:14.6	1+5 3+9; 0+0 2+3; 1+3 1+3; 0+1 0+2; 0+1 0+1	
