= Biathlon World Championships 2012 – Mixed relay =

Mixed relay at the Biathlon World Championships 2012
- Date: 1 March 2012
- Competitors: 108 from 27 nations
- Winning time: 1:12:29.3

Medalists
gold medal	Tora Berger; Synnøve Solemdal; Ole Einar Bjørndalen; Emil Hegle Svendsen	Norway
silver medal	Andreja Mali; Teja Gregorin; Klemen Bauer; Jakov Fak	Slovenia
bronze medal	Andrea Henkel; Magdalena Neuner; Andreas Birnbacher; Arnd Peiffer	Germany

The mixed relay competition of the Biathlon World Championships 2012 was held on March 1, 2012, starting at 15:30 local time. Defending champions Norway won the event ahead of silver medalist Slovenia and third placed Germany.

Although Slovenia crossed the finish line 8.2 seconds in front of Norway, the jury awarded bonus seconds for the Norwegians because one target did not go down despite Bjoerndalen hitting it, therefore taking an additional penalty loop, which put them ahead of Slovenia into the first place.

== Results ==
The race started at 15:30.

Rank	Bib	Team	Time	Penalties (P+S)	Deficit
1st place, gold medalist(s)	20	Norway; Tora Berger; Synnøve Solemdal; Ole Einar Bjørndalen; Emil Hegle Svendsen	1:12:29.3; 16:29.1; 17:42.8; 19:38.5; 18:38.9	0+3 0+7; 0+0 0+0; 0+1 0+3; 0+2 0+2; 0+0 0+2	
2nd place, silver medalist(s)	19	Slovenia; Andreja Mali; Teja Gregorin; Klemen Bauer; Jakov Fak	1:12:49.5; 18:04.2; 16:58.1; 19:04.4; 18:42.8	0+5 0+2; 0+1 0+0; 0+1 0+0; 0+3 0+2; 0+0 0+0	+20.2
3rd place, bronze medalist(s)	4	Germany; Andrea Henkel; Magdalena Neuner; Andreas Birnbacher; Arnd Peiffer	1:13:02.1; 17:43.8; 16:46.6; 18:37.6; 19:54.1	0+4 1+6; 0+2 0+1; 0+1 0+2; 0+0 0+0; 0+1 1+3	+32.8
4	7	Sweden; Anna Maria Nilsson; Helena Ekholm; Björn Ferry; Fredrik Lindström	1:13:29.3; 18:26.3; 16:36.7; 19:20.1; 19:06.2	0+4 0+5; 0+1 0+2; 0+0 0+0; 0+2 0+1; 0+1 0+2	+1:00.0
5	2	Russia; Olga Vilukhina; Olga Zaitseva; Dmitry Malyshko; Anton Shipulin	1:13:57.0; 17:51.2; 17:11.2; 19:16.5; 19:38.1	0+2 0+3; 0+0 0+0; 0+0 0+2; 0+1 0+1; 0+1 0+0	+1:27.7
6	10	Belarus; Nadezhda Skardino; Darya Domracheva; Sergey Novikov; Evgeny Abramenko	1:14:22.2; 18:04.6; 17:03.5; 19:15.3; 19:58.8	0+3 0+4; 0+0 0+1; 0+2 0+2; 0+0 0+0; 0+1 0+1	+1:52.9
7	6	Slovakia; Jana Gereková; Anastasiya Kuzmina; Matej Kazár; Dušan Šimočko	1:14:25.6; 17:32.7; 17:24.0; 19:47.5; 19:41.4	0+6 0+4; 0+0 0+2; 0+2 0+1; 0+3 0+1; 0+1 0+0	+1:56.3
8	5	Czech Republic; Veronika Vítková; Barbora Tomešová; Ondřej Moravec; Michal Šlesingr	1:14:25.7; 17:38.7; 17:47.4; 19:44.9; 19:14.7	0+8 0+6; 0+2 0+1; 0+2 0+0; 0+3 0+3; 0+1 0+2	+1:56.4
9	8	Italy; Michela Ponza; Katja Haller; Markus Windisch; Lukas Hofer	1:14:26.4; 17:58.0; 17:54.5; 19:45.4; 18:48.5	0+6 0+2; 0+1 0+0; 0+1 0+0; 0+3 0+2; 0+1 0+0	+1:57.1
10	22	Switzerland; Elisa Gasparin; Selina Gasparin; Benjamin Weger; Simon Hallenbarter	1:14:54.9; 18:15.9; 17:39.3; 19:42.6; 19:17.1	0+6 0+5; 0+1 0+1; 0+1 0+2; 0+2 0+2; 0+2 0+0	+2:25.6
11	1	France; Marie-Laure Brunet; Marie Dorin; Simon Fourcade; Martin Fourcade	1:15:06.9; 17:22.2; 17:01.0; 21:15.9; 19:27.8	0+5 1+7; 0+0 0+1; 0+0 0+0; 0+3 1+3; 0+2 0+3	+2:37.6
12	9	United States; Sara Studebaker; Susan Dunklee; Tim Burke; Lowell Bailey	1:15:08.7; 19:00.2; 17:30.4; 19:25.6; 19:12.5	0+2 1+7; 0+0 1+3; 0+1 0+2; 0+1 0+2; 0+0 0+0	+2:39.4
13	13	Poland; Krystyna Pałka; Weronika Nowakowska-Ziemniak; Tomasz Sikora; Krzysztof Plywaczyk	1:15:19.6; 18:04.2; 17:46.2; 19:35.4; 19:53.8	0+0 0+6; 0+0 0+3; 0+0 0+2; 0+0 0+0; 0+0 0+1	+2:50.3
14	3	Ukraine; Natalya Burdyga; Vita Semerenko; Andriy Deryzemlya; Serhiy Semenov	1:15:45.8; 18:04.1; 18:22.1; 19:34.5; 19:45.1	1+8 0+4; 0+1 0+1; 1+3 0+0; 0+2 0+1; 0+2 0+2	+3:16.5
15	14	Estonia; Kadri Lehtla; Eveli Saue; Indrek Tobreluts; Roland Lessing	1:16:10.6; 18:04.5; 18:26.8; 20:16.7; 19:22.6	0+2 2+7; 0+1 0+2; 0+1 0+2; 0+0 2+3; 0+0 0+0	+3:41.3
16	11	Finland; Kaisa Mäkäräinen; Mari Laukkanen; Ahti Toivanen; Jarkko Kauppinen	1:16:31.8; 17:38.5; 18:50.1; 19:25.8; 20:37.4	1+5 1+8; 0+2 0+2; 1+3 0+2; 0+0 0+1; 0+0 1+3	+4:02.5
17	15	Japan; Fuyuko Suzuki; Itsuka Owada; Kazuya Inomata; Junji Nagai	1:16:52.4; 18:22.5; 18:21.8; 20:11.7; 19:56.4	0+7 0+3; 0+1 0+3; 0+3 0+0; 0+2 0+0; 0+1 0+0	+4:23.1
18	18	Canada; Megan Imrie; Zina Kocher; Jean-Philippe Leguellec; Nathan Smith	1:17:35.8; 18:57.4; 19:35.3; 19:20.0; 19:43.1	0+4 3+8; 0+2 0+2; 0+0 3+3; 0+0 0+1; 0+2 0+2	+5:06.5
19	24	Romania; Éva Tófalvi; Luminita Piscoran; Stefan Gavrila; Laurentiu Vamanu	1:18:32.4; 17:45.0; 18:00.7; 21:09.7; 21:37.0	0+3 1+8; 0+0 0+1; 0+0 0+2; 0+2 1+3; 0+1 0+2	+6:03.1
20	23	Kazakhstan; Darya Usanova; Elena Khrustaleva; Yan Savitskiy; Alexsandr Chervyhkov	1:18:36.1; 19:15.0; 18:25.6; 19:51.1; 21:04.4	0+8 0+6; 0+3 0+1; 0+0 0+0; 0+2 0+2; 0+3 0+3	+6:06.8
21	21	Austria; Iris Waldhuber; Ramona Düringer; Friedrich Pinter; Christoph Sumann	1:23:38.1; 24:47.6; 19:14.9; 20:15.9; 19:19.7	1+5 0+4; 0+0 0+1; 0+2 0+1; 0+3 0+2; 1+0 0+0	+11:08.8
22	12	Bulgaria; Emilia Yordanova; Nina Klenovska; Krasimir Anev; Michail Kletcherov	LAP; 20:09.1; 18:47.8; 20:33.6	1+5 1+8; 1+3 0+3; 0+2 0+0; 0+0 1+3; 0+0 0+2	
23	26	Latvia; Žanna Juškāne; Baiba Bendika; Artūrs Koļesņikovs; Rolands Pužulis	LAP; 19:37.7; 19:48.8; 20:45.5	0+3 0+5; 0+1 0+3; 0+1 0+0; 0+1 0+2; 0+0 0+0	
24	25	Great Britain; Amanda Lightfoot; Adele Walker; Lee-Steve Jackson; Pete Beyer	LAP; 18:43.8; 20:30.2; 20:47.8	0+8 2+11; 0+1 0+2; 0+3 2+3; 0+2 0+3; 0+2 0+3	
25	16	Lithuania; Natalija Kocergina; Aliona Sabaliauskiene; Tomas Kaukėnas; Karolis Zlatkauskas	LAP; 20:22.8; 21:06.5; 19:57.7	1+7 0+6; 1+3 0+3; 0+2 0+0; 0+1 0+1; 0+1 0+2	
26	17	China; Tang Jialin; Song Chaoqing; Ren Long; Chen Haibin	LAP; 19:58.9; 20:30.2; 22:18.9	4+8 1+4; 0+1 1+3; 2+3 0+0; 2+3 0+0; 0+1 0+1	
	27	South Korea; Kim Seon-su; Mun Ji-hee; Jun Je-uk; Lee In-bok	DNF; 19:51.5	0+3 0+1; 0+3 0+1	
