= Biathlon at the 2007 Asian Winter Games – Women's pursuit =

Women's 10 kilometre pursuit at the 2007 Asian Winter Games
- Venue: Beida Lake Skiing Resort
- Dates: 30 January 2007
- Competitors: 17 from 5 nations

Medalists
gold medal	Kong Yingchao	China
silver medal	Liu Xianying	China
bronze medal	Dong Xue	China
bronze medal	Yelena Khrustaleva	Kazakhstan

The women's 10 kilometre pursuit at the 2007 Asian Winter Games was held on 30 January 2007 at Beida Lake Skiing Resort, China.

== Schedule ==
All times are China Standard Time (UTC+08:00)

Date	Time	Event
Tuesday, 30 January 2007	10:00	Final

== Results ==
Legend

- DNS — Did not start

Rank	Athlete	Start	Penalties					Time
Rank	Athlete	Start	P	P	S	S	Total	Time
1st place, gold medalist(s)	Kong Yingchao (CHN)	0:04	0	0	0	0	0	36:13.9
2nd place, silver medalist(s)	Liu Xianying (CHN)	0:00	1	0	0	2	3	38:02.4
3rd place, bronze medalist(s)	Dong Xue (CHN)	0:57	0	2	1	2	5	40:13.0
3rd place, bronze medalist(s)	Yelena Khrustaleva (KAZ)	2:58	3	0	1	0	4	42:30.3
5	Yin Qiao (CHN)	2:52	1	2	0	2	5	42:43.4
6	Viktoriya Afanasyeva (KAZ)	2:02	2	0	1	4	7	43:03.2
7	Megumi Izumi (JPN)	2:33	3	0	3	0	6	44:20.3
8	Inna Mozhevitina (KAZ)	4:01	1	1	2	1	5	45:17.1
9	Ikuyo Tsukidate (JPN)	3:12	3	3	1	2	9	45:35.6
10	Megumi Matsuura (JPN)	3:20	5	2	1	0	8	46:01.6
11	Tamami Tanaka (JPN)	1:50	4	3	3	3	13	46:05.9
12	Chu Kyung-mi (KOR)	3:18	1	0	1	2	4	47:44.1
13	Tatyana Mazunina (KAZ)	3:21	3	2	2	4	11	49:15.1
14	Kim Seon-su (KOR)	3:23	3	3	3	0	9	51:06.0
15	Jo In-hee (KOR)	5:00	2	5	0	2	9	53:30.7
16	Mun Ji-hee (KOR)	5:00	2	3	4	1	10	54:37.6
—	Kao Yi-ching (TPE)	5:00						DNS

- Yelena Khrustaleva was awarded bronze because of no three-medal sweep per country rule.
