= Yin Qiao =

Chinese biathlete (born 1985)

Personal information
- Nationality: Chinese
- Born: 2 July 1985 (age 40)

Sport
- Sport: Biathlon
Medal record
Women's biathlon
Representing China
Youth World Championships
Gold medal – first place	2002 Ridnaun	3 × 6 km relay

Yin Qiao (born 2 July 1985) is a Chinese biathlete. She competed in two events at the 2006 Winter Olympics.
