= Christa Perathoner =

Italian biathlete (born 1987)

Personal information
- Born: June 7, 1987 Brixen, Italy

Sport
- Sport: Skiing
- Updated on February 28, 2013

Christa Perathoner (born in Brixen on June 7, 1987) is an Italian biathlete.

Perathoner competed in the 2010 Winter Olympics for Italy. Her best finish was 79th, in the individual.

As of February 2013, her best performance at the Biathlon World Championships is 45th, in the 2009 sprint.

As of February 2013, Perathoner's best Biathlon World Cup result is 9th, as part of the women's relay at Hochfilzen in 2008/09. Her best individual finish is 32nd, in the sprint at Antholz in 2008/09. Her best overall finish in the Biathlon World Cup is 87th, in 2008/09.
