= Chen Haibin =

Chinese cross-country skier (born 1984)

Personal information
- Nationality: Chinese
- Born: 22 May 1984 (age 40)

Sport
- Sport: Cross-country skiing

Chen Haibin (born 22 May 1984) is a Chinese cross-country skier. He competed in the men's sprint event at the 2006 Winter Olympics.
