= Shinya Saito =

Japanese biathlete (born 1980)

Personal information
- Nationality: Japanese
- Born: 2 June 1980 (age 44); Aomori, Japan

Sport
- Sport: Biathlon

Shinya Saito (齊藤 慎弥, Saitō Shin'ya, born 2 June 1980) is a Japanese biathlete. He competed in the men's 20 km individual event at the 2006 Winter Olympics.
