= Tian Ye (skier) =

Chinese cross-country skier and biathlete

Tian Ye (Chinese: 田野; born 29 July 1982 in Heilongjiang) is a Chinese cross-country skier and biathlete.

He participated as a cross-country skier at the 2006 Winter Olympics in the classical 15 kilometre race (53rd), in the sprint race (53rd) and in the team sprint (18th).

After this season he switched to biathlon. At the 10 km sprint of the 2007 Asian Winter Games he finished in 5th place.
