= Tina Bachmann =

German biathlete

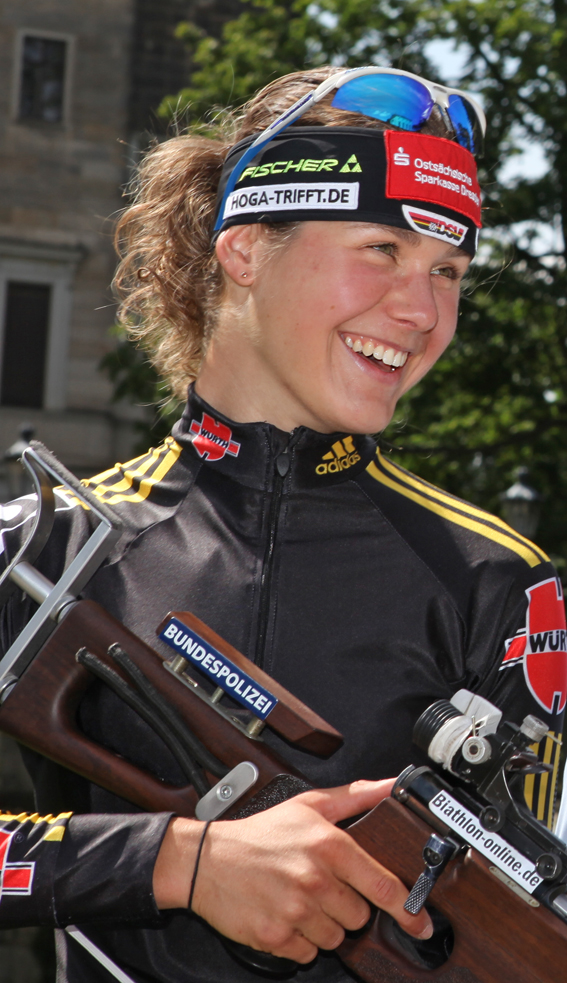

Medal record

Women's biathlon

Representing Germany

World Championships
Gold medal – first place	2012 Ruhpolding	4 × 6 km relay
Gold medal – first place	2011 Khanty-Mansiysk	4 × 6 km relay
Silver medal – second place	2011 Khanty-Mansiysk	15 km individual

Tina Bachmann (born 15 July 1986 in Schmiedeberg) is a German former professional biathlete.

== Career ==
At the World Championships 2011 in Khanty-Mansiysk Bachmann won silver in 15 km Individual and gold with the women's team in the 4 × 6 km Relay race.

At the Ruhpolding world championships in 2012 Bachmann became a double relay champion. Just as in 2011 she teamed up with Magdalena Neuner, Andrea Henkel and Miriam Gössner. Bachmann turned in a near perfect performance needing just 1 spare round to clean the targets and putting in one of her strongest performances in a relay. Bachmann's strong individual performance in the relay was a perfect way to make up for poor shooting in the relays in Hochfilzen and Antholz where she had one penalty loop which meant Germany finished off the podium.

Bachmann finished the 2011/2012 world cup season 14th overall with 546 pts.

Her one world cup win came in the sprint event at Khanty-Mansysik in the 2008–09 season.
