= Sergey Naumik =

Kazakhstani biathlete (born 1985)

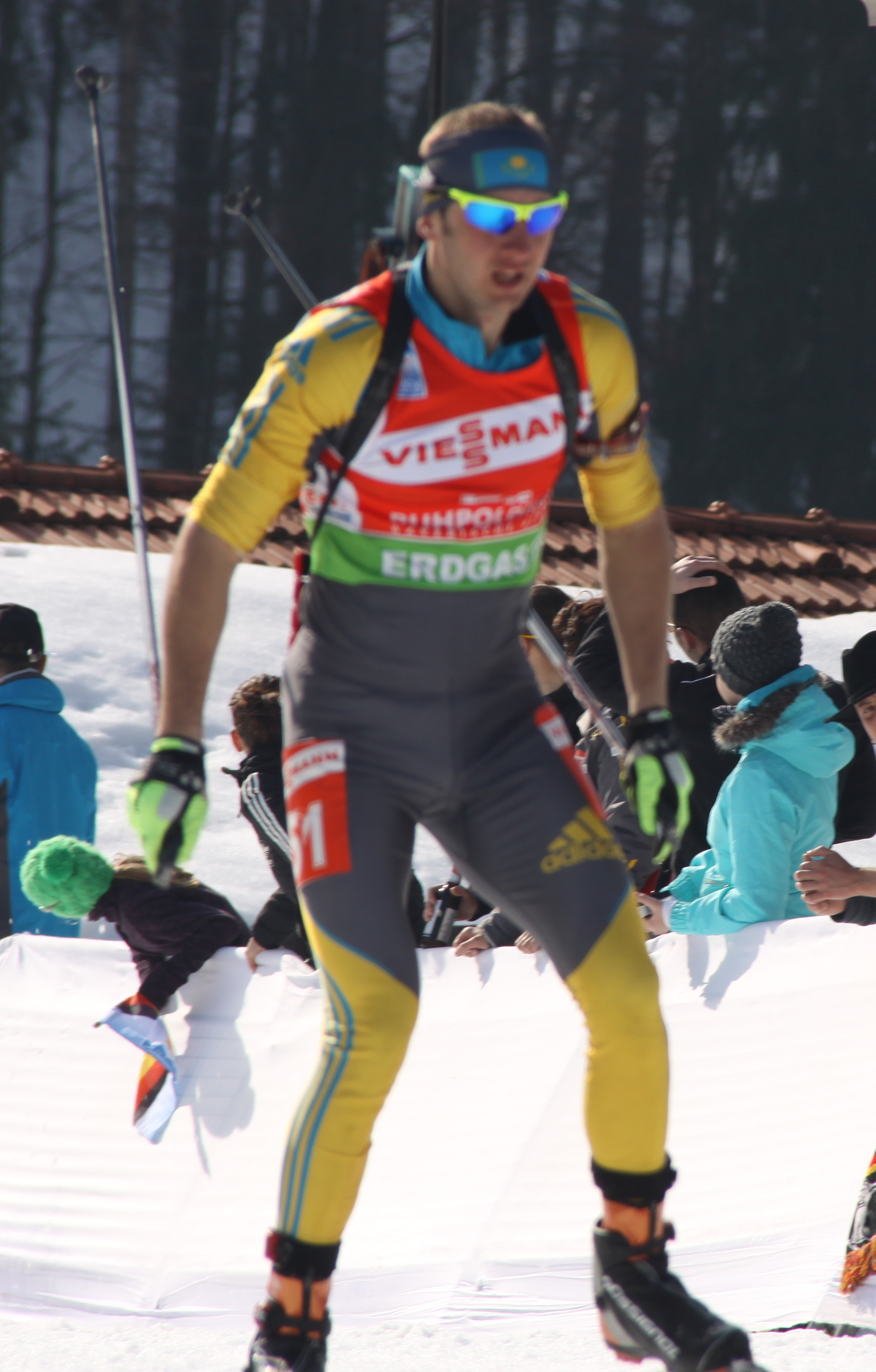
Sergey Naumik

Sergey Naumik (born 8 October 1985) is a Kazakhstani biathlete. He was born in the West Kazakhstan Province. He competed at the Biathlon World Championships 2010, 2011, 2012 and 2013, and at the 2014 Winter Olympics in Sochi, in sprint, pursuit and individual.
