= Simone Hauswald =

German biathlete (born 1979)

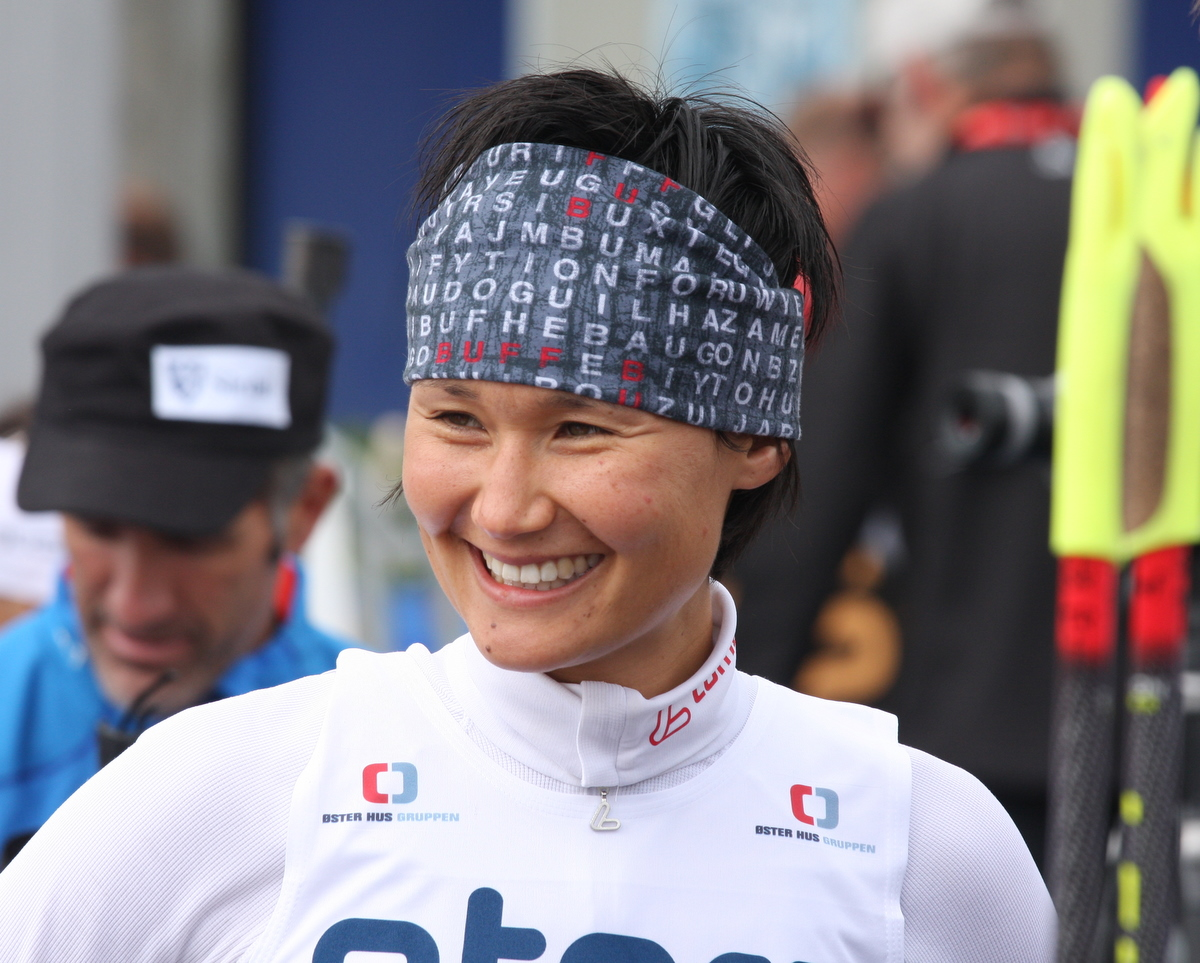
- Hauswald in Sandnes

Personal information
- Full name: Simone Hye-Soon Denkinger
- Born: 3 May 1979 (age 47) Rottweil, Baden-Württemberg, West Germany
- Height: 1.69 m (5 ft 7 in)

Sport
- Sport: Skiing
- Club: SC Gosheim

World Cup career
- Seasons: 2000–2010
- Indiv. podiums: 16
- Indiv. wins: 7
Medal record
Women's biathlon
Representing Germany
Olympic Games
Bronze medal – third place	2010 Vancouver	12.5 km mass start
Bronze medal – third place	2010 Vancouver	4 × 6 km relay
World Championships
Gold medal – first place	2010 Khanty-Mansiysk	Mixed relay
Silver medal – second place	2009 Pyeongchang	7.5 km sprint
Bronze medal – third place	2003 Khanty-Mansiysk	4 × 6 km relay
Bronze medal – third place	2004 Oberhof	4 × 6 km relay
Bronze medal – third place	2009 Pyeongchang	Mixed relay
Junior World Championships
Gold medal – first place	1998 Jericho/Valcartier	Individual
Gold medal – first place	1998 Jericho/Valcartier	Relay
Gold medal – first place	1999 Pokljuka	3 × 7.5 km relay
Silver medal – second place	1999 Pokljuka	12.5 km individual
- Updated on 21 March 2010

Simone Hye-Soon Hauswald (born Simone Hye-Soon Denkinger; 3 May 1979) is a former German biathlete and Winter Olympics bronze medalist. In 2008, she won her first single World Cup Race. Hauswald retired after the 2009–10 season.

== Biography ==
Hauswald was born to a German father and Korean mother. As a teenager she trained at the Skiinternat Furtwangen, an alpine sports training facility in Furtwangen im Schwarzwald, and met her coach and future husband, former skier Steffen Hauswald. The couple have twin daughters.

== Career highlights ==
IBU World Championships
2003, Khanty-Mansiysk, (bronze) 3rd at team relay (with Disl / Wilhelm / Glagow)
2004, Oberhof, (bronze) 3rd at team relay (with Glagow / Apel / Wilhelm)
2009, Pyeongchang, (silver) 2nd at sprint
2009, Pyeongchang, (bronze) 3rd at mixed relay
IBU World Junior Championships
1998, Jericho, (gold) 1st at individual race
1998, Jericho, 8th at sprint
1999, Pokljuka, (gold) 1st at team relay (with Flatscher / Glagow)
1999, Pokljuka, (silver) 2nd at individual race
World Cup
2002, Östersund, (gold) 1st at team relay (with Apel / Disl / Wilhelm)
2002, Pokljuka, (silver) 2nd at team relay (with Glagow / Henkel / K. Beer)
2002, Osrblie, (silver) 2nd at team relay (with Glagow / K. Beer / Wilhelm)
2003, Antholz, (silver) 2nd at team relay (with Disl / R. Beer / Wilhelm)
2004, Ruhpolding, (gold) 1st at team relay (with Disl / Apel / Wilhelm)
2005, Antholz, (bronze) 3rd at pursuit
2005, Khanty-Mansiysk, (bronze) 3rd at sprint
2005, Hochfilzen, (bronze) 3rd at team relay (with Glagow / Apel / Wilhelm)
2006, Ruhpolding, (silver) 2nd at team relay (with Glagow / Henkel / Apel)
2007, Ruhpolding, (silver) 2nd at team relay (with Hitzer / Neuner / Wilhelm)
2007, Kontiolahti, (bronze) 3rd at individual race
2007, Hochfilzen, (gold) 1st at team relay (with Glagow / Henkel / Wilhelm)
2007–08, Oberhof, (gold) 1st at team relay (with Henkel / Hitzer / Wilhelm)
2008, Hochfilzen, (gold) 1st at sprint
2008, Hochfilzen, (bronze) 3rd at pursuit
2008, Hochfilzen, (bronze) 3rd at individual race
2009, Vancouver-Whistler (gold) 1st at individual race
2009, Trondheim, (silver) 2nd at mass start
2009, Khanty-Mansiysk, (silver) 2nd at sprint
2009, Khanty-Mansiysk (gold) 1st at mass start
World Military Championships
2004, Östersund, (silver) 2nd at team patrol (with Künzel / Apel / Wilhelm)
European Championships
2000, Zakopane, (bronze) 3rd at individual race
2000, Zakopane, (bronze) 3rd at team relay (with Wagenführ / Klein / Wilhelm)
2001, Haute Maurienne, (gold) 1st at team relay (with K. Beer / Flatscher / Menzel)
2001, Haute Maurienne, (silver) 2nd at sprint
2002, Kontiolahti, (gold) 1st at team relay (with Menzel / Klein / Buchholz)
European Cup
2005, Ridnaun-Val Ridanna, (gold) 1st at pursuit
2005, Ridnaun-Val Ridanna, (gold) 1st at team relay (with Niziak / Ertl / Buchholz)
2005, Ridnaun-Val Ridanna, (gold) 1st at sprint

=== Season titles ===
Season	Discipline
2010	Sprint

=== Race victories ===
7 race victories (3 Sprint, 2 Mass Start, 1 Individual, 1 Pursuit)

Season	Date	Location	Race
2009	12 December 2008	Hochfilzen, Austria	Sprint
2009	11 March 2009	Vancouver-Whistler, Canada	Individual
2009	29 March 2009	Khanty-Mansiysk, Russia	Mass Start
2010	8 January 2010	Oberhof, Germany	Sprint
2010	18 March 2010	Oslo-Holmenkollen, Norway	Sprint
2010	20 March 2010	Oslo-Holmenkollen, Norway	Pursuit
2010	21 March 2010	Oslo-Holmenkollen, Norway	Mass Start
