= Olga Kudrashova =

Belarusian biathlete (born 1978)

Personal information
- Nationality: Belarusian
- Born: 1978 (age 46–47)

Sport
- Sport: Biathlon

Olga Kudrashova (born 1978 in Zelenodolsk, Russia) is a Belarusian biathlete. She represented Belarus at the 2010 Winter Olympics in Vancouver, Canada.

She took up biathlon in 1996. A two-time 2007 European Champion in the pursuit and relay, and a bronze medalist in the sprint. She participated in two World Championships. Her best result in the World Cup stages is 8th place (twice). She is a Master of Sport of the Republic of Belarus of international class.
