= Liv Kjersti Bergman =

Norwegian biathlete (born 1979)

Personal information
- Born: 20 March 1979 (age 47)

Sport
Medal record
Women's biathlon
Representing Norway
Junior World Championships
Silver medal – second place	1998 Jericho/Valcartier	Relay

Liv Kjersti Bergman (born Liv Kjersti Eikeland; 20 March 1979 in Bergen) is a former Norwegian biathlete. She debuted in the World Cup in 1999 in Oberhof. Her best position so far is a second on the 15 km from Östersund in 2006. She participated in the World Championship 2005 in Hochfilzen where she achieved a 16th place in the 15 km and was a part of the Norwegian team who came in fifth.
