= Dong Xue =

Chinese biathlete

Dong Xue (Chinese: 董雪; pinyin: Dǒng Xuě; born August 17, 1986, in Jilin) is a Chinese biathlete.

== Career ==
Dong has been running biathlon since 1999. She is trained by Liang Liu and René Altenburger-Koch. As a member of the People's Liberation Army she lives in Dalian and competes for the Chinese Biathlon Association.

In the World Cup in Lake Placid in 2004 she was competing for the first time. She won her first points at the following World Cup stop in Fort Kent as 20th in the sprint and 27th in the following pursuit.

She made her breakthrough into the world's best at the beginning of the 2006/07 season. At the first World Cup stop in Östersund she came 12th and 11th in the sprint and pursuit, and at the following World Cup in Hochfilzen she came seventh in the sprint and thus made it into the top ten for the first time. With 24th place in the overall ranking of the World Cup, she also achieved her best result there of the season.

With 37th place in the pursuit at the Biathlon World Championships 2008 in Östersund, Dong achieved her best World Cup result in an individual race the following season.

From March 12 to 13, 2024, in the FIS Freestyle Ski and Snowboarding World Championships 2023 – Women's parallel slalom, Dong Xue won the third place in the women's group in the snowboarding parallel slalom event.
