= Magda Rezlerová =

Czech biathlete (born 1982)

Personal information
- Born: 9 August 1982 (age 43) Turnov, Czechoslovakia

Sport
- Sport: Skiing
Medal record
Women's biathlon
Representing Czech Republic
Junior World Championships
Silver medal – second place	2001 Khanty-Mansiysk	3 × 7.5 km relay
Bronze medal – third place	2000 Hochfilzen	12.5 km individual
Bronze medal – third place	2003 Kościelisko	10 km pursuit
Bronze medal – third place	2003 Kościelisko	3 × 6 km relay

Magda Rezlerová (born 9 August 1982) is a Czech biathlete. She represented the Czech Republic at the 2010 Winter Olympics.
