= Agnieszka Cyl =

Polish biathlete (born 1984)

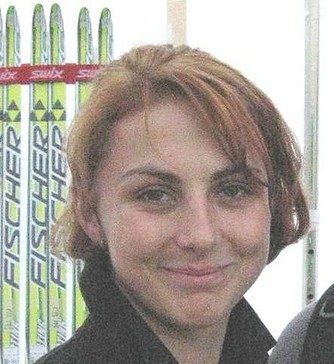
Agnieszka Cyl

Agnieszka Cyl (née Grzybek, born 28 February 1984) is a biathlete from Poland. She competed at the 2010 Winter Olympics in Vancouver. In the 15 km individual race, she placed 7th with a time of 42:32.5.
