= Song Chaoqing =

Chinese biathlete

Song Chaoqing (Chinese: 宋朝卿; pinyin: Sòng Cháoqīng; born March 21, 1991) is a Chinese biathlete. She was on a gold medal-winning team at the eleventh National Winter Games and competed for China at the 2010 Winter Olympics and the 2014 Winter Olympics.
