= Andreja Mali =

Slovenian biathlete (born 1977)

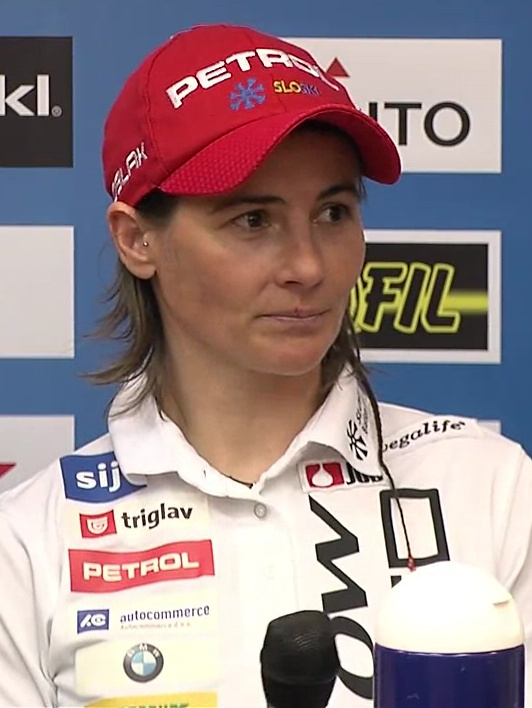

Medal record

Biathlon

Representing Slovenia

World Championships
Silver medal – second place	2012 Ruhpolding	Mixed relay

Andreja Mali (born 17 November 1977, in Kamnik, SFR Yugoslavia) is a former Slovenian biathlete and former cross-country skier.

== Career ==
Mali competes for the club TSK Jub Dob Pri Ljubljani and has been part of the Slovenian national biathlon team since 2000. The instructor in the army of Kamnik made her Biathlon World Cup debut in 2001. She was selected for the 2002 Winter Olympics in Salt Lake City, where she placed 27th in sprint and 32nd in the pursuit race. She reached the top 10 in the 2002–03 season, placing 8th in sprints in Pokljuka and in Oslo at Holmenkollen. Her best result was a 4th place in the mass start race in Antholz, which remains her best international placing.

Mali's top result in the Biathlon World Championships was 14th place in the sprint at the Biathlon World Championships 2004 in Oberhof, where she placed 14th in singles and 18th in the mass start was. Also ran very well the Biathlon World Championships 2007 in Antholz. Here it was 16th in the pursuit and 4th in the women's relay.

Mali competed in two more Olympic Games, in 2006 Winter Olympics in Turin with a 21st place in the individual, and a 6th place in relay, and at the 2010 Winter Olympics in Vancouver where she finished 19th in the sprint.

Mali originally competed in cross-country skiing, and for a time competed in both sports simultaneously. In that sport, she made her World Cup race debut in 1995, and was particularly successful in the sprint events, with her first World Cup top-10 placing in Milan in 1997. In December 1998 she managed three podium places in the sprint events, in Milan and Kitzbühel she came in second. Even after moving to the biathletes continue sporadically in Mali will start cross-country skiing World Cup. So they started, for example at the Olympic Games in Salt Lake City in the sprint and placed 7th. On World Championships took her 1997 in Trondheim 1999 in Ramsau, 2001 in Lahti and 2003 in Val di Fiemme - only in the last sprint - without much success in part. At the 2012 World Championships, Mali won the silver medal at the mixed relay, together with Teja Gregorin, Klemen Bauer and Jakov Fak.

== Cross-country skiing results ==
All results are sourced from the International Ski Federation (FIS).

=== Olympic Games ===
Year	Age	10 km individual	15 km mass start	Pursuit	30 km	Sprint	4 × 5 km relay
2002	24	—	—	—	—	7	9

=== World Championships ===
Year	Age	5 km individual	10 km individual	15 km	Pursuit	30 km	Sprint	4 × 5 km relay
1997	19	59	—N/a	43	46	—	—N/a	—
1999	21	47	—N/a	—	43	—	—N/a	—
2001	23	—N/a	—	—	59	CNX^{[a]}	22	11
2003	25	—N/a	—	—	—	—	20	—

a. ^{1} Cancelled due to extremely cold weather.

=== World Cup ===
==== Season standings ====
Season	Age					
Season	Age	Overall	Distance	Long Distance	Middle Distance	Sprint
1996	18	NC	—N/a	—N/a	—N/a	—N/a
1997	19	NC	—N/a	NC	—N/a	—
1998	20	35	—N/a	NC	—N/a	32
1999	21	29	—N/a	NC	—N/a	9
2000	22	30	—N/a	—	42	12
2001	23	52	—N/a	—N/a	—N/a	21
2002	24	53	—N/a	—N/a	—N/a	34
2003	25	65	—N/a	—N/a	—N/a	46
2004	26	81	—	—N/a	—N/a	50
2005	27	85	—	—N/a	—N/a	63
2006	28	NC	—	—N/a	—N/a	NC

==== Individual podiums ====
- 3 podiums – (3 WC)

No.	Season	Date	Location	Race	Level	Place
1	1998–99	10 December 1998	Milan, Italy	0.6 km Sprint F	World Cup	2nd
2	1998–99	27 December 1998	Garmisch-Partenkirchen, Germany	1.5 km Sprint F	World Cup	3rd
3	1998–99	29 December 1998	Kitzbühel, Austria	1.5 km Sprint F	World Cup	2nd
