= Diana Rasimovičiūtė =

Lithuanian biathlete (born 1984)

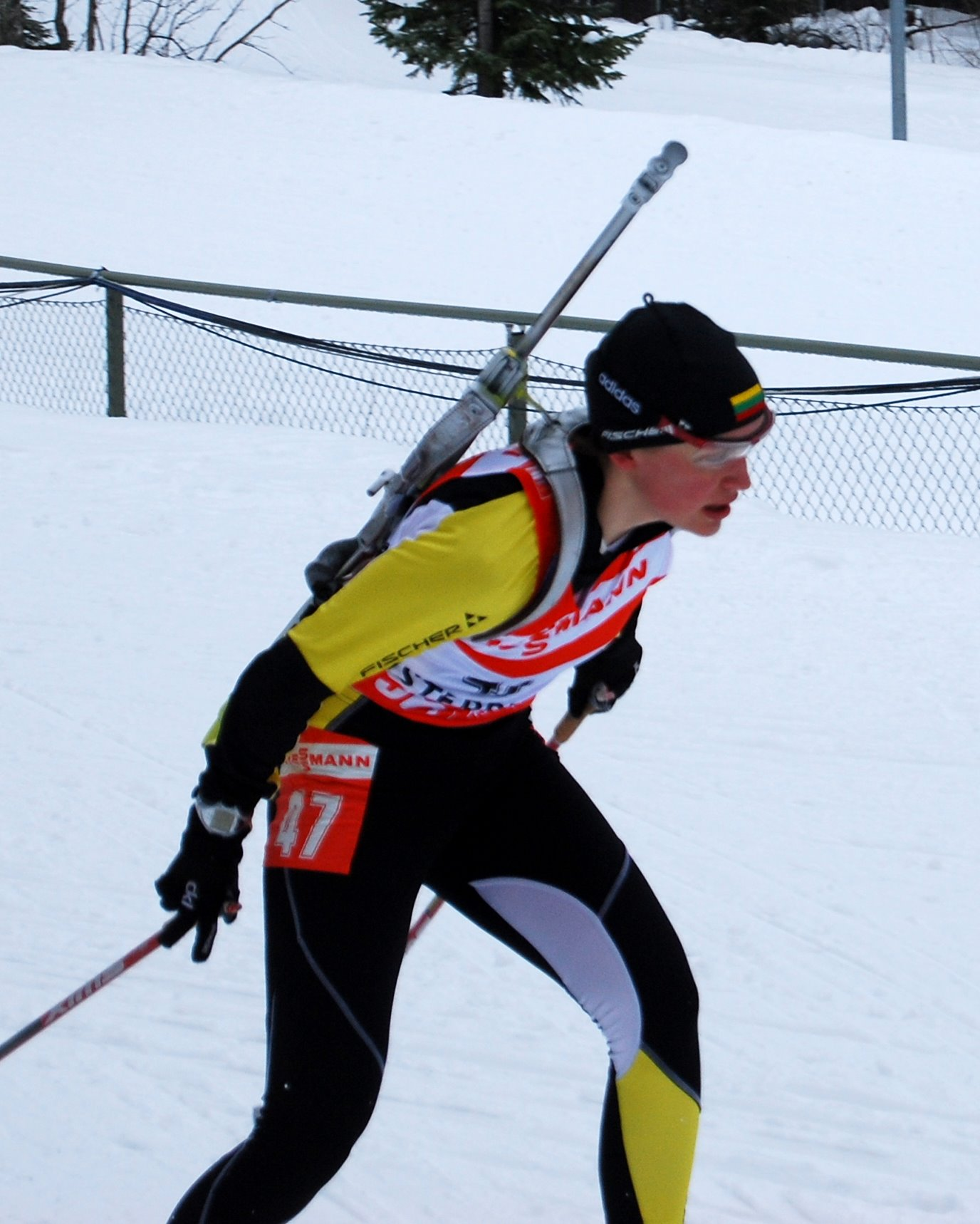
- Rasimovičiūtė in 2008

Personal information
- Born: 25 February 1984 (age 42) Ignalina, Lithuania

Sport
- Sport: Skiing

World Cup career
- Seasons: 2001–2019
Medal record
Representing Lithuania
Women's biathlon
European Championships
Silver medal – second place	2010 Otepää	Sprint
Silver medal – second place	2010 Otepää	Individual
- Updated on January 31, 2019

Diana Rasimovičiūtė (born 25 February 1984, in Ignalina) is a Lithuanian athlete who competes in biathlon events. She represented Lithuania in five Winter Olympics from 2002 to 2018. She has also won two silver medals at the Biathlon European Championships.

== Early life ==
Diana Rasimovičiūtė was born 25 February 1984 in Ignalina, Lithuania.

== Career ==
Rasimovičiūtė started competing in the Biathlon World Cup events in 2001. She was named to the Lithuanian team for the 2002 Winter Olympics held at Salt Lake City. This was her debut at the Winter Olympics. She competed in a single event at the competition. She finished in 66th in the women's sprint event after she completed the course in 25 minutes 41.4 seconds with three shooting misses. She was named to the Lithuanian team for the 2006 Winter Olympics. This was her second appearance at the Winter Olympics. She participated in all of the women's individual medal events. She registered her best finish in the sprint event, in which she was placed 18th amongst the 83 competitors. In the individual event, she finished 66th amongst the 82 participants.

In the 2010 Biathlon European Championships, she won two silver medals in the sprint and individual events. In 2010, she was named to the Lithuanian team for the third consecutive Olympics. She represented the country in all three of the women's individual medal events. She registered her best finish in the women's sprint event, finishing 25th amongst the 88 participants.

In 2014, Rasimovičiūtė was named to the Lithuanian team for the 2014 Winter Olympics. She finished in 51st, 43rd, and 42ns in the women's sprint, pursuit, and individual events respectively. In 2018, she was named to the Lithuanian team for the fifth consecutive time. This was her last appearance at the Winter Games. She was placed 65th and 75th in the women's sprint and women's individual events.

=== Olympic Games ===
0 medals

Event	Individual	Sprint	Pursuit	Mass start	Relay	Mixed relay
(Italy) 2006 Torino	66th	18th	27th	—	—	—
(Canada) 2010 Vancouver	30th	25th	34th	—	—	—
(Russia) 2014 Sochi	42nd	51st	43rd	—	—	—
(South Korea) 2018 Pyeongchang	75th	65th	—	—	—	19th

:*The mixed relay was added as an event in 2014.

=== World Championships ===
0 medals

Event	Individual	Sprint	Pursuit	Mass start	Relay	Mixed relay
(Austria) 2005 Hochfilzen	78th	58th	49th	—	—	—
(Italy) 2007 Antholz-Anterselva	59th	31st	32nd	—	—	—
(Sweden) 2008 Östersund	55th	47th	45th	—	—	—
(South Korea) 2009 Pyeongchang	47th	11th	31st	28th	—	—
(Russia) 2011 Khanty-Mansiysk	—	59th	DNS	—	—	23rd
(Germany) 2012 Ruhpolding	55th	45th	50th	—	23rd	—
(Czech Republic) 2013 Nové Město	70th	40th	38th	—	LAP	25th
(Finland) 2015 Kontiolahti	DNF	61st	—	—	20th	—
(Austria) 2017 Hochfilzen	77th	81st	—	—	21st	24th

*During Olympic seasons competitions are only held for those events not included in the Olympic program.
