= Alexandr Trifonov =

Kazakhstani biathlete (born 1986)

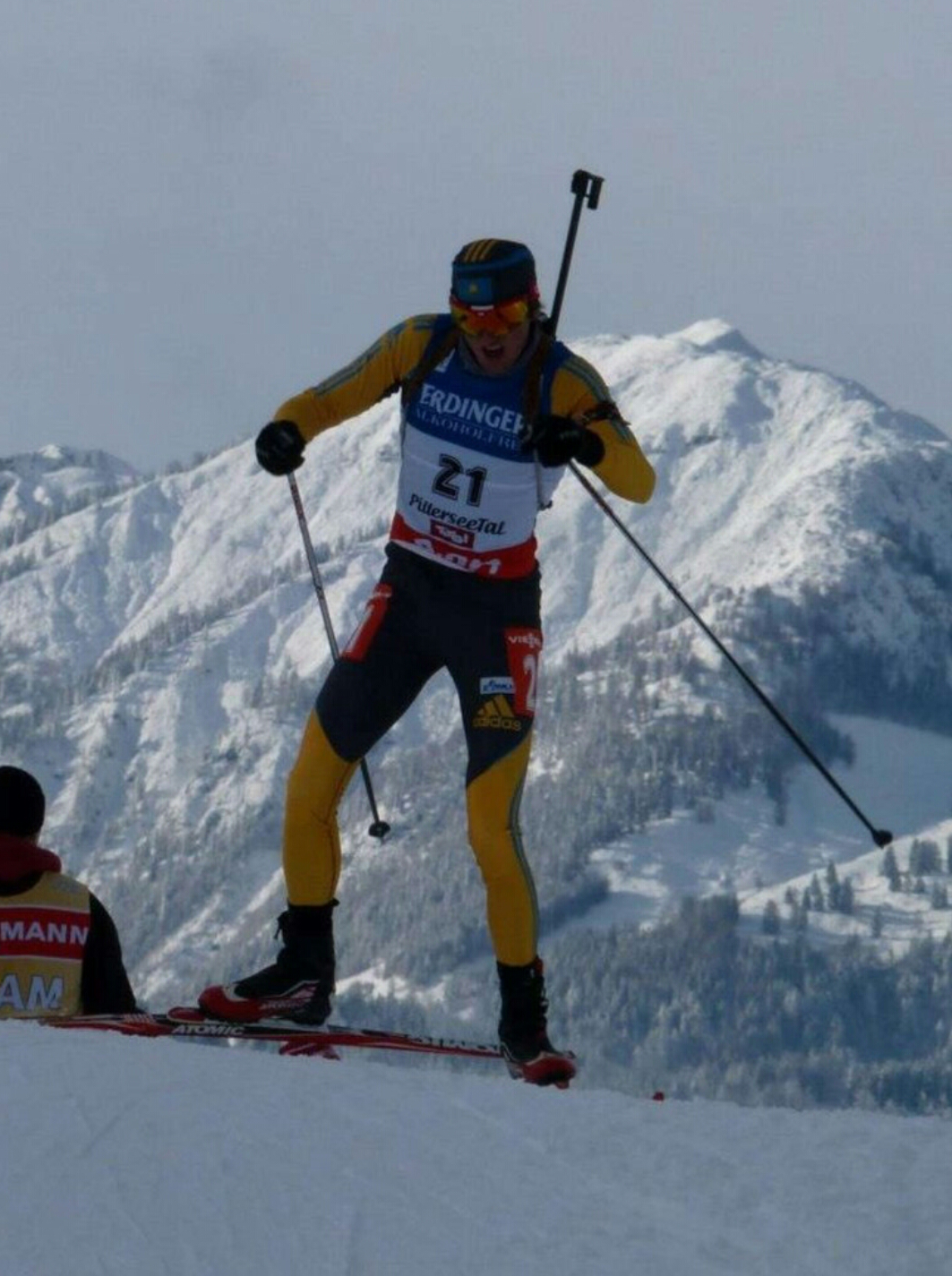

Personal information
- Born: March 13, 1986 (age 40) Leninogorsk, Kazakh SSR, Soviet Union

Sport
- Sport: Skiing
- Updated on February 28, 2013

Alexandr Trifonov (born March 13, 1986) is a Kazakh biathlete.

He competed in the 2010 Winter Olympics for Kazakhstan. His best finish was 18th, as part of the Kazakh relay team. He also finished 69th in the individual.

As of February 2013, his best performance at the Biathlon World Championships, is 15th, in the 2012 men's relay. His best individual performance in a World Championships is 80th, in the 2012 sprint.

As of February 2013, his best Biathlon World Cup finish is 15th, achieved in two men's relay events. His best individual finish is 53rd, in the 2010/11 sprint race at Östersund.
