= Teja Gregorin =

Slovenian biathlete (born 1980)

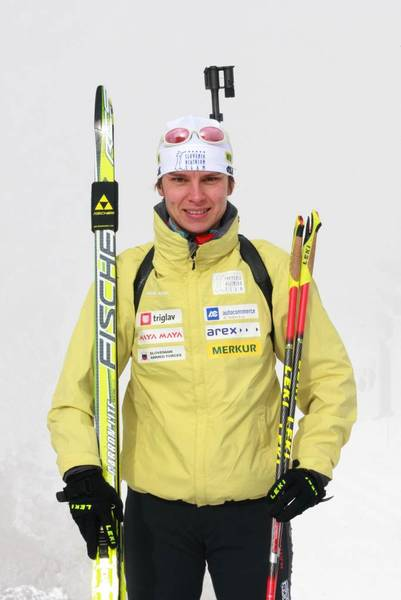

Personal information
- Full name: Teja Gregorin
- Born: 29 June 1980 (age 46) Ljubljana, SFR Yugoslavia
- Height: 1.71 m (5 ft 7 in)

Sport
- Sport: Skiing

World Cup career
- Seasons: 2003–2017
- Indiv. podiums: 3
Medal record
Women's biathlon
Representing Slovenia
Women's biathlon
Olympic Games
Bronze medal – third place	2014 Sochi	Pursuit
World Championships
Silver medal – second place	2009 Pyeongchang	15 km individual
Silver medal – second place	2012 Ruhpolding	Mixed relay
World Summer Championships
Gold medal – first place	2014 Tyumen	7,5 km sprint
Gold medal – first place	2014 Tyumen	10 km pursuit
Bronze medal – third place	2014 Tyumen	Mixed relay
World Military Games
Gold medal – first place	2017 Sochi	7,5 km sprint

Teja Gregorin (born 29 June 1980 in Ljubljana, SFR Yugoslavia) is a retired Slovenian biathlete.

== Career ==
She was a member of the Slovenian biathlon team from 2002 to 2017, having been a cross-country skier before that. Her best result in the Biathlon World Cup is 2nd place in the 15 km Individual race in the World Championships held in Pyeongchang, Korea during the 2008–09 season. At the 2012 World Championships, Gregorin won the silver medal at the mixed relay, together with Andreja Mali, Klemen Bauer and Jakov Fak.

The Slovenian biathlete was the only competitor who failed the 2017 doping retests from the 2010 Winter Olympics. In October 2017, the International Biathlon Union said that two samples given by Teja Gregorin tested positive for GHRP-2, a banned substance which stimulates the body to produce more growth hormone, in samples taken the week before competition started. She was disqualified in December 2017 and issued with a two-year ban.

== Biathlon results ==
=== Olympic Games ===
Event	Individual	Sprint	Pursuit	Mass Start	Relay	Mixed Relay
(Italy) 2006 Turin	18th	14th	16th	19th	6th	—N/a
(Canada) 2010 Vancouver	DSQ (36th)	DSQ (9th)	DSQ (9th)	DSQ (5th)	DSQ (8th)	—N/a
(Russia) 2014 Sochi	11th	15th	Bronze	5th		

=== World Championships ===
Event	Individual	Sprint	Pursuit	Mass Start	Relay	Mixed Relay
(Italy) 2007 Antholz-Anterselva	13th	11th	7th	15th	4th	4th
(Sweden) 2008 Oestersund	6th	32nd	31st	14th	12th	9th
(South Korea) 2009 Pyeongchang	Silver	64th	–	13th	–	12th
(Russia) 2010 Khanty-Mansiysk	Not held in an Olympic season					10th
(Russia) 2011 Khanty-Mansiysk	30th	14th	18th	5th	–	16th
(Germany) 2012 Ruhpolding	11th	11th	12th	13th	–	Silver
(Czech Republic) 2013 Nové Město na Moravě	25th	39th	32nd	8th	17th	5th
(Finland) 2015 Kontiolahti	–	–	–	–	23rd	–
(Norway) 2016 Holmenkollen	23rd	30th	47th	–	9th	13th
(Austria) 2017 Hochfilzen	12th	30th	35th	5th	17th	18th

=== World Cup ===
==== Podiums ====
Season	Place	Competition	Placement
Biathlon World Championships 2009	(South Korea) Pyeongchang	Individual	2nd
2011–12 Biathlon World Cup	(Norway) Oslo	Mass Start	3rd
Biathlon at the 2014 Winter Olympics	(Russia) Sochi	Pursuit	3rd

*Results are from IBU races which include the Biathlon World Cup, Biathlon World Championships and the Winter Olympic Games.

== Cross-country skiing results ==
All results are sourced from the International Ski Federation (FIS).

=== Olympic Games ===
Year	Age	10 km	15 km	Pursuit	30 km	Sprint	4 × 5 km relay
2002	21	—	—	41	—	34	9

=== World Championships ===
Year	Age	10 km	15 km	Pursuit	30 km	Sprint	4 × 5 km relay
2001	20	—	52	62	CNX^{[a]}	33	—

a. ^{1} Cancelled due to extremely cold weather.

=== World Cup ===
==== Season standings ====
Season	Age				
Season	Age	Overall	Long Distance	Middle Distance	Sprint
2000	19	NC	NC	NC	NC
2001	20	NC	—N/a	—N/a	NC
2002	21	NC	—N/a	—N/a	NC
2003	22	80	—N/a	—N/a	53
