= Lee In-bok =

South Korean biathlete (born 1984)

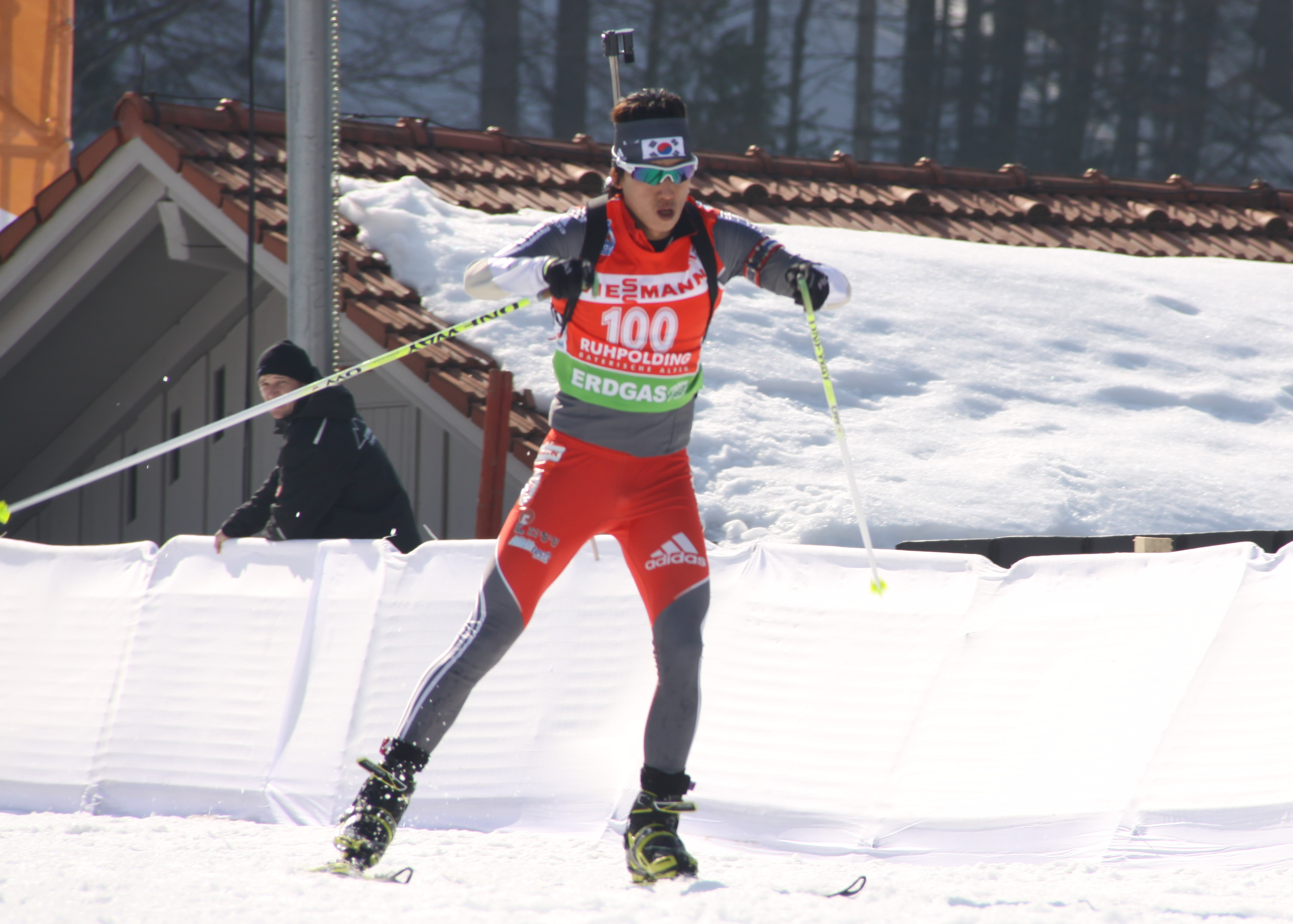

Personal information
- Born: March 30, 1984 North Jeolla Province, South Korea

Sport
- Sport: Skiing
- Updated on February 28, 2013

- Lee In-bok
- Hangul: 이인복
- RR: I Inbok
- MR: I Inbok

Lee In-bok (Korean: 이인복; born 30 March 1984) is a South Korean biathlete.

He competed in the Winter Olympics for South Korea. His best performance was 65th, in the sprint. He also finished 71st in the individual.

As of February 2013, his best performance at the Biathlon World Championships, is 19th, in the 2008 and 2009 mixed relays. His best individual performance is 72nd, in the 2008 and 2013 individual races.

As of February 2013, his best Biathlon World Cup finish is 14th, as part of the Korean mixed relay team at Pyeongchang in 2007/08. His best individual finish is 53rd, in the individual at Hochfilzen in 2008/09.
