= Katja Haller =

Italian biathlete (born 1981)

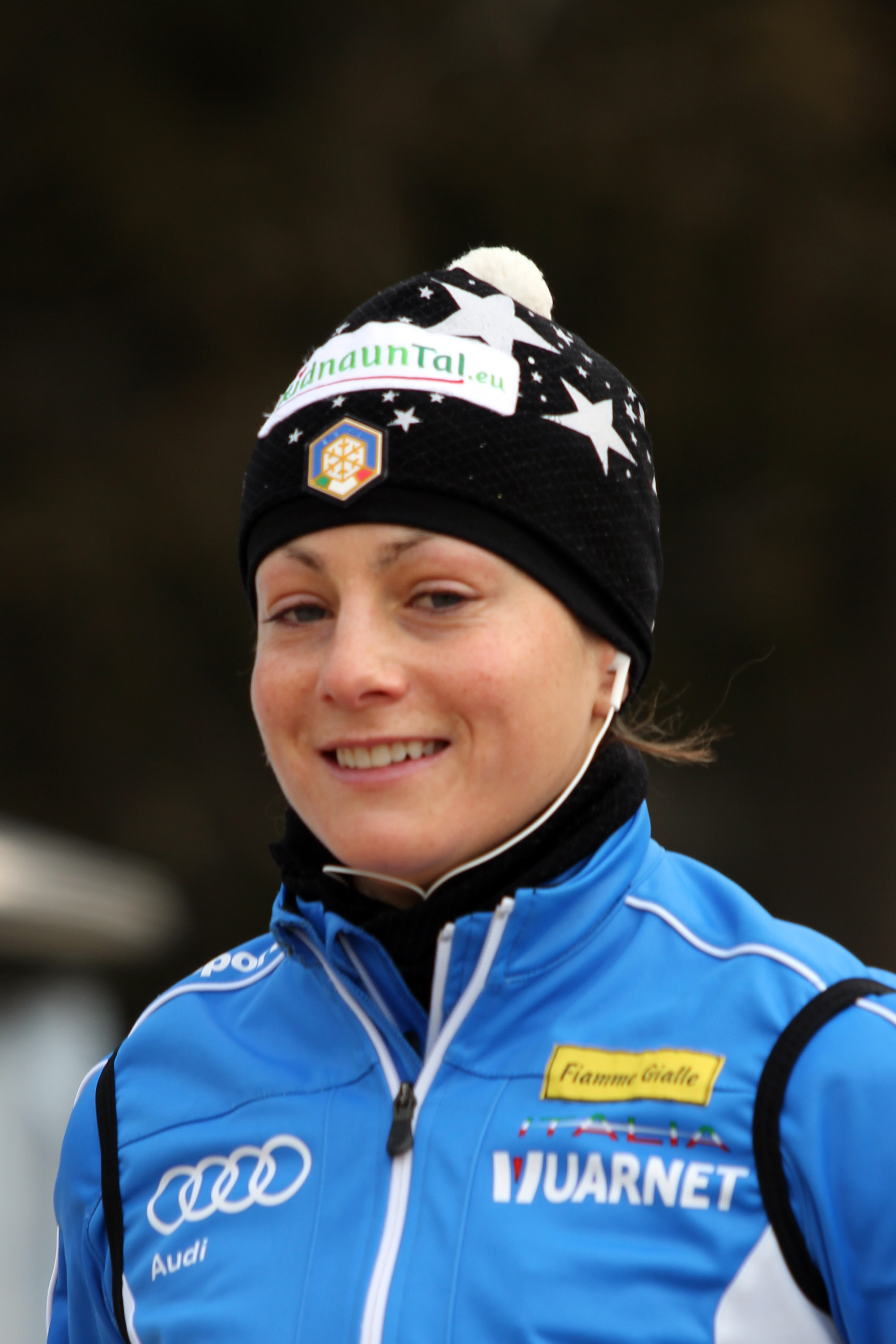

Personal information
- Born: 12 January 1981 (age 45) Sterzing, Italy
- Height: 1.63 m (5 ft 4 in)

Skiing career
- Sport: Alpine skiing
- Disciplines: Biathlon

Olympics
- Teams: 3
- Medals: 0 (0 gold)

World Championships
- Medals: 0 (0 gold)

World Cup
- Wins: 0
- Overall titles: 0
- Discipline titles: 0

Katja Haller (born 12 January 1981) is an Italian professional biathlete, who has been competing on the World Cup circuit since the 2001–02 season. She has had one second-place and one third-place finishes in World Cup races. She has also competed in three Olympic Games, in Salt Lake City in 2002, in Turin in 2006 and in Vancouver in 2010.

Haller was born in Sterzing.

Further notable results

- 2000: 3rd, Italian championships of biathlon, pursuit
- 2002:
  - 3rd, Italian championships of biathlon, sprint
  - 3rd, Italian championships of biathlon, mass start
- 2004: 2nd, Italian championships of biathlon, mass start
- 2005:
  - 2nd, Italian championships of biathlon, sprint
  - 3rd, Italian championships of biathlon, pursuit
- 2007:
  - 1st, Italian championships of biathlon, pursuit
  - 2nd, Italian championships of biathlon, sprint
  - 3rd, Italian championships of biathlon, mass start
- 2008:
  - 3rd, Italian championships of biathlon, sprint
  - 3rd, Italian championships of biathlon, mass start
- 2009:
  - 2nd, Italian championships of biathlon, sprint
  - 2nd, Italian championships of biathlon, pursuit
- 2010: 2nd, Italian championships of biathlon, pursuit
