= 2008–09 Biathlon World Cup – Relay Men =

The 2008-09 Biathlon World Cup/Relay Men started on December 14, 2008 in Hochfilzen and will end on March 15, 2009 in Vancouver. Defending titlist is the Norwegian team.

== Competition format ==
The relay teams consist of four biathletes, who each ski 7.5 kilometres (4.7 mi), each leg skied over three laps, with two shooting rounds; one prone, one standing. For every round of five targets there are eight bullets available, though the last three can only be single-loaded manually one at a time from spare round holders or bullets deposited by the competitor into trays or onto the mat at the firing line. If after eight bullets there are still misses, one 150 m penalty loop must be taken for each missed target remaining. The first-leg participants start all at the same time, and as in cross-country skiing relays, every athlete of a team must touch the team's next-leg participant to perform a valid changeover. On the first shooting stage of the first leg, the participant must shoot in the lane corresponding to their bib number (Bib #10 shoots at lane #10 regardless of position in race.), then for the remainder of the relay, the relay team shoots at the lane in the position they arrived (Arrive at the range in 5th place, you shoot at lane five.).

== 2007-08 Top 3 Standings ==
Medal	Country	Points
Gold:	Norway	196
Silver:	Russia	192
Bronze:	Germany	175

== Medal winners ==
Event:	Gold:	Time	Silver:	Time	Bronze:	Time
Hochfilzen (1) details	Russia; Ivan Tcherezov; Maxim Tchoudov; Maxim Maksimov; Nikolay Kruglov, Jr.	1:24:22.97 (0+0) (0+1) (0+0) (0+0)	Austria; Daniel Mesotitsch; Friedrich Pinter; Dominik Landertinger; Christoph Sumann	1:26:11.08 (0+0) (0+0) (0+2) (0+0)	Ukraine; Vyacheslav Derkach; Andriy Deryzemlya; Oleg Berezhnoy; Serguei Sednev	1:27:01.50 (2+0) (0+1) (0+0) (0+0)
Hochfilzen (2) details	Austria; Daniel Mesotitsch; Friedrich Pinter; Tobias Eberhard; Christoph Sumann	1:21:23.18 (0+2) (0+3) (0+0) (0+0)	Sweden; Magnús Jónsson; Mattias Nilsson; Björn Ferry; Carl Johan Bergman	1:22:34.33 (0+2) (1+5) (0+2) (0+3)	France; Vincent Jay; Vincent Defrasne; Jean-Guillaume Béatrix; Simon Fourcade	1:22:39.44 (0+2) (0+0) (0+2) (0+1)
Oberhof details	Austria; Daniel Mesotitsch; Friedrich Pinter; Dominik Landertinger; Christoph Sumann	1:19:36.6 (0+3) (0+3) (0+4) (0+2)	Germany; Michael Greis; Michael Rösch; Arnd Peiffer; Toni Lang	1:19:55.8 (1+3) (0+2) (0+0) (0+4)	Norway; Emil Hegle Svendsen; Rune Brattsveen; Halvard Hanevold; Ole Einar Bjørndalen	1:20:52.6 (0+1) (1+6) (0+2) (1+3)
Ruhpolding details	Norway; Emil Hegle Svendsen; Alexander Os; Halvard Hanevold; Ole Einar Bjørndalen	1:24:54.0 (0+2) (0+1) (0+0) (0+2)	Germany; Michael Rösch; Christoph Stephan; Arnd Peiffer; Toni Lang	1:26:14.2 (0+3) (0+1) (0+4) (0+2)	Austria; Daniel Mesotitsch; Friedrich Pinter; Tobias Eberhard; Christoph Sumann	1:26:37.1 (0+5) (0+3) (0+3) (0+2)
World Championships details	Norway; Emil Hegle Svendsen; Lars Berger; Halvard Hanevold; Ole Einar Bjørndalen	1:08:04.1 (1+3) (1+3) (0+0) (0+3)	Austria; Daniel Mesotitsch; Simon Eder; Dominik Landertinger; Christoph Sumann	1:08:16.7 (0+1) (0+1) (0+3) (0+2)	Germany; Michael Rösch; Christoph Stephan; Arnd Peiffer; Michael Greis	1:08:36.8 (0+2) (0+4) (0+1) (0+3)
Vancouver details	Sweden; David Ekholm; Mattias Nilsson; Fredrik Lindström; Carl Johan Bergman	1:16:18.6 (0+1) (0+3) (0+2) (0+0)	France; Vincent Jay; Vincent Defrasne; Martin Fourcade; Simon Fourcade	1:16:24.9 (0+2) (0+1) (0+0) (0+0)	Germany; Simon Schempp; Daniel Böhm; Arnd Peiffer; Michael Rösch	1:16:35.0 (0+3) (0+3) (0+2) (0+2)

== Final standings ==
#	Country	HOC1	HOC2	OBE	RUH	WCH	VAN	Total
1	Austria	54	60	60	48	54	~~40~~	276
2	Norway	43	~~38~~	48	60	60	43	254
3	Germany	~~32~~	43	54	54	48	48	247
4	France	~~30~~	48	43	38	43	54	226
5	Sweden	38	54	34	34	~~32~~	60	220
6	Ukraine	48	40	28	~~26~~	40	38	194
7	Italy	31	32	~~29~~	43	36	31	173
8	Belarus	34	36	40	~~22~~	22	34	166
9	Czech Republic	~~28~~	34	32	36	31	30	162
10	Slovenia	40	27	30	31	~~26~~	32	160
11	Switzerland	29	30	38	~~27~~	34	28	159
12	Slovakia	27	31	36	32	29	–	155
13	United States	26	28	31	40	~~20~~	29	154
14	Russia	60	–	–	–	38	36	134
15	Latvia	21	26	26	25	24	–	122
16	Finland	22	24	25	30	19	–	120
17	Bulgaria	19	22	23	24	30	–	118
18	Canada	36	29	–	–	25	26	116
19	United Kingdom	20	21	22	21	~~16~~	25	109
20	Poland	25	–	0	28	28	27	108
21	Estonia	24	0	24	29	27	–	104
22	Japan	–	25	27	23	23	–	98
23	Kazakhstan	23	23	–	–	21	–	67
24	South Korea	–	20	–	20	18	–	58
25	Serbia	18	19	–	–	15	–	52
26	China	–	–	–	–	17	–	17
