= 2008–09 Biathlon World Cup – Pursuit Women =

The 2008-09 Biathlon World Cup/Pursuit Women is a biathlon competition for women. It started on Sunday December 7, 2008 in Östersund and is scheduled to finish on Saturday March 28, 2009 in Khanty-Mansiysk. The defending titlist is Sandrine Bailly of France.

== Competition format ==
This is a pursuit competition. The biathletes' starts are separated by their time differences from a previous race, most commonly a sprint race. The contestants ski a distance of 10 kilometres (6.2 mi) over five laps. On four of the laps, the contestants shoot at targets; each miss requires the contestant to ski a penalty loop of 150 metres (490 ft). There are two prone shooting bouts and two standing bouts, in that order. The contestant crossing the finish line first is the winner.

To prevent awkward and/or dangerous crowding of the skiing loops, and overcapacity at the shooting range, World Cup Pursuits are held with only the 60 top ranking biathletes after the preceding race. The biathletes shoot (on a first-come, first-served basis) at the lane corresponding to the position they arrived for all shooting bouts.

Points are awarded for each event, according to each contestant's finish. When all events are completed. the contestant with the highest number of points is declared the season winner.

== 2007-08 Top 3 Standings ==
Medal	Athlete	Points
Gold:	(France) Sandrine Bailly	300
Silver:	(Germany) Andrea Henkel	289
Bronze:	(Germany) Kati Wilhelm	253

== Medal winners ==
Event:	Gold:	Time	Silver:	Time	Bronze:	Time
Östersund	Martina Beck; Germany	32:42.4 (0+0+0+0)	Svetlana Sleptsova; Russia	33:11.6 (0+1+1+1)	Kati Wilhelm; Germany	33:14.4 (0+1+2+0)
Hochfilzen	Martina Beck; Germany	33:41.28 (0+0+1+0)	Svetlana Sleptsova; Russia	33:59.56 (1+0+1+2)	Simone Hauswald; Germany	34:00.40 (0+1+2+2)
Ruhpolding	Magdalena Neuner; Germany	32:56.5 (1+1+1+1)	Kati Wilhelm; Germany	33:18.2 (1+0+0+2)	Tora Berger; Norway	33:25.5 (1+0+0+1)
Antholz	Anna Boulygina; Russia	32:49.8 (0+1+0+1)	Kaisa Mäkäräinen; Finland	32:52.1 (0+0+0+1)	Darya Domracheva; Belarus	32:52.1 (1+0+1+0)
World Championships	Helena Jonsson; Sweden	34:12.3 (2+0+0+0)	Kati Wilhelm; Germany	34:30.6 (1+1+3+1)	Olga Zaitseva; Russia	34:36.4 (0+3+1+2)
Trondheim	Andrea Henkel; Germany	30:08.8 (0+0+0+0)	Olga Zaitseva; Russia	30:21.7 (0+0+0+1)	Marie-Laure Brunet; France	30:37.1 (0+0+0+1)
Khanty-Mansiysk	Magdalena Neuner; Germany	27:53.0 (1+0+0+1)	Michela Ponza; Italy	28:21.8 (0+0+0+0)	Marie Dorin; France	28:23.5 (0+0+1+0)

== Final standings ==
#	Name	ÖST	HOC	RUH	ANT	WCH	TRO	KHA	Total
1	(Germany) Kati Wilhelm	48	36	54	40	54	40	~~22~~	272
2	(Norway) Tora Berger	40	43	48	~~28~~	32	43	40	246
3	(Germany) Martina Beck	60	60	~~20~~	32	38	25	29	244
4	(Germany) Andrea Henkel	43	32	29	38	–	60	32	234
5	(Germany) Magdalena Neuner	24	~~14~~	60	34	30	23	60	231
6	(Sweden) Helena Jonsson	34	40	36	~~21~~	60	31	25	226
7	(Russia) Olga Zaitseva	~~18~~	28	34	19	48	54	36	219
8	(Belarus) Darya Domracheva	36	~~0~~	32	48	40	38	20	214
9	(Sweden) Anna Carin Olofsson	23	30	38	43	26	~~2~~	38	198
10	(Finland) Kaisa Mäkäräinen	7	~~0~~	27	54	43	29	18	178
11	(Russia) Svetlana Sleptsova	54	54	43	–	13	–	–	164
12	(France) Marie-Laure Brunet	20	10	–	16	36	48	30	160
13	(China) Liu Xianying	29	38	40	36	12	–	–	155
14	(Romania) Éva Tófalvi	38	~~9~~	30	20	20	32	13	153
15	(Italy) Michela Ponza	14	13	~~12~~	17	28	18	54	144
16	(Germany) Simone Hauswald	–	48	–	15	29	20	28	140
17	(France) Marie Dorin	11	11	24	~~2~~	23	19	48	136
18	(Ukraine) Vita Semerenko	30	0	7	–	22	30	43	132
19	(Russia) Anna Boulygina	0	–	1	60	21	13	31	126
20	(Norway) Julie Bonnevie-Svendsen	6	27	18	–	0	36	34	121
21	(Moldova) Natalia Levchenkova	19	29	8	25	34	0	–	115
22	(Russia) Olga Medvedtseva	27	31	28	–	27	–	–	113
23	(Poland) Magdalena Gwizdon	26	34	5	0	–	27	19	111
24	(France) Sylvie Becaert	16	–	9	31	4	28	17	105
25	(China) Wang Chunli	32	8	31	6	0	26	–	103
26	(Ukraine) Oksana Khvostenko	28	26	–	24	19	–	–	97
27	(Norway) Solveig Rogstad	31	18	–	–	18	1	23	91
28	(Slovenia) Teja Gregorin	–	23	11	22	–	17	2	75
29	(Germany) Kathrin Hitzer	0	22	22	30	–	–	–	74
30	(Estonia) Eveli Saue	0	4	~~0~~	26	9	12	15	66
31	(Russia) Oksana Neupokoeva	17	21	–	–	–	22	6	66
32	(Germany) Juliane Doll	–	–	–	27	–	21	14	62
33	(Ukraine) Valj Semerenko	25	–	26	–	3	–	7	61
34	(Canada) Zina Kocher	–	0	19	14	17	0	8	58
35	(Belarus) Olga Kudrashova	1	5	21	29	–	0	–	56
36	(Russia) Iana Romanova	–	–	–	23	–	15	16	54
37	(Czech Republic) Veronika Vítková	–	–	–	–	31	11	11	53
38	(Belarus) Olga Nazarova	–	3	25	–	15	7	0	50
39	(France) Sandrine Bailly	0	–	4	–	1	24	21	50
40	(Slovakia) Anastasiya Kuzmina	–	–	16	1	24	9	0	50
41	(Norway) Ann Kristin Flatland	12	20	–	–	11	0	–	43
42	(Poland) Krystyna Pałka	–	–	0	8	0	34	–	42
43	(China) Song Chaoqing	0	6	23	13	0	–	–	42
44	(Italy) Katja Haller	5	12	–	0	16	–	9	42
45	(Germany) Tina Bachmann	–	–	–	–	–	14	27	41
46	(Poland) Weronika Novakowska	–	0	13	0	25	–	1	39
47	(Norway) Anne Ingstadbjoerg	0	19	–	5	–	10	–	34
48	(China) Kong Yingchao	15	15	–	–	–	–	–	30
49	(China) Dong Xue	22	7	0	–	–	0	–	29
50	(France) Julie Carraz-Collin	13	16	0	–	–	–	–	29
51	(Czech Republic) Magda Rezlerova	3	–	14	0	7	5	–	29
52	(Ukraine) Olena Pidrushna	9	–	10	–	–	0	10	29
53	(Belarus) Nadezhda Skardino	0	0	0	–	–	4	24	28
54	(Russia) Olga Vulikhina	–	–	–	–	–	–	26	26
55	(Russia) Natalia Sokolova	–	25	–	–	–	–	–	25
56	(Bulgaria) Pavlina Filipova	2	0	–	9	14	–	–	25
57	(Kazakhstan) Elena Khrustaleva	–	24	–	–	0	–	–	24
58	(Russia) Olga Anisimova	–	–	0	18	–	–	5	23
59	(Latvia) Madara Liduma	21	0	–	0	–	0	–	21
60	(Estonia) Kadri Lehtla	4	–	–	–	0	16	–	20
61	(Slovenia) Andreja Mali	8	0	–	0	0	8	4	20
62	(Belarus) Liudmila Kalinchik	–	–	6	12	0	0	–	18
63	(China) Liu Yuan-Yuan	0	–	17	0	–	–	–	17
64	(Germany) Sabrina Buchholz	–	17	–	–	–	–	–	17
65	(Sweden) Sofia Domeij	–	2	15	0	–	0	0	17
66	(Romania) Dana Plotogea	0	0	0	10	6	0	–	16
67	(Poland) Agnieszka Grzybek	–	–	3	3	8	–	0	14
68	(Norway) Synnøve Solemdal	–	–	–	–	–	–	12	12
69	(Czech Republic) Zdenka Vejnarova	0	0	0	11	–	–	–	11
70	(Ukraine) Lilia Vaygina-Efremova	10	0	–	–	–	–	–	10
71	(Lithuania) Diana Rasimovičiūtė	0	0	0	–	10	–	–	10
72	(Norway) Liv Kjersti Eikeland	0	–	0	7	–	0	–	7
73	(Sweden) Anna Maria Nilsson	–	0	0	4	0	0	3	7
74	(France) Pauline Macabies	–	0	0	–	–	6	–	6
75	(Czech Republic) Veronika Zvaricova	–	–	–	–	5	–	–	5
76	(Poland) Paulina Bobak	–	–	–	0	–	3	–	3
77	(Kazakhstan) Anna Lebedeva	–	0	2	–	0	–	–	2
78	(United States) Lanny Barnes	–	–	–	–	2	–	–	2
79	(Romania) Mihaela Purdea	0	1	–	–	0	0	0	1
