= 2008–09 Biathlon World Cup – Relay Women =

The 2008-09 Biathlon World Cup/Relay Women started on December 14, 2008 in Hochfilzen and will end on March 14, 2009 in Vancouver. Defending titlist is the German team.

== Competition format ==
The relay teams consist of four biathletes, who each ski 7.5 kilometres (4.7 mi), each leg skied over three laps, with two shooting rounds; one prone, one standing. For every round of five targets there are eight bullets available, though the last three can only be single-loaded manually one at a time from spare round holders or bullets deposited by the competitor into trays or onto the mat at the firing line. If after eight bullets there are still misses, one 150 m penalty loop must be taken for each missed target remaining. The first-leg participants start all at the same time, and as in cross-country skiing relays, every athlete of a team must touch the team's next-leg participant to perform a valid changeover. On the first shooting stage of the first leg, the participant must shoot in the lane corresponding to their bib number (Bib #10 shoots at lane #10 regardless of position in race.), then for the remainder of the relay, the relay team shoots at the lane in the position they arrived (Arrive at the range in 5th place, you shoot at lane five.).

== 2007-08 Top 3 Standings ==
Medal	Country	Points
Gold:	Germany	200
Silver:	Russia	178
Bronze:	France	172

== Medal winners ==
Event:	Gold:	Time	Silver:	Time	Bronze:	Time
Hochfilzen (1) details	Norway; Solveig Rogstad; Julie Bonnevie-Svendsen; Ann Kristin Flatland; Tora Berger	1:12:44.3 (0+1) (0+0) (1+6) (0+1)	France; Marie-Laure Brunet; Sylvie Becaert; Julie Carraz-Collin; Sandrine Bailly	1:12:46.4 (0+2) (0+3) (0+1) (0+3)	Germany; Andrea Henkel; Martina Beck; Simone Hauswald; Kati Wilhelm	1:13:28.5 (0+4) (0+2) (0+4) (2+3)
Hochfilzen (2) details	Germany; Andrea Henkel; Simone Hauswald; Magdalena Neuner; Kathrin Hitzer	1:15:43.7 (0+0) (1+4) (2+3) (0+1)	France; Marie-Laure Brunet; Sylvie Becaert; Julie Carraz-Collin; Sandrine Bailly	1:16:14.1 (0+1) (0+0) (0+2) (2+4)	Poland; Krystyna Pałka; Magdalena Gwizdoń; Weronika Novakowska; Agnieszka Grzybek	1:16:29.6 (0+0) (0+0) (0+2) (0+3)
Oberhof details	Ukraine; Olena Pidhrushna; Valj Semerenko; Vita Semerenko; Oksana Khvostenko	1:17:57.9 (0+0) (0+0) (0+3) (0+1)	Germany; Simone Hauswald; Kati Wilhelm; Sabrina Buchholz; Kathrin Hitzer	1:18:19.1 (1+5) (0+1) (1+3) (0+3)	France; Marie-Laure Brunet; Sylvie Becaert; Pauline Macabies; Marie Dorin	1:19:02.3 (0+3) (0+4) (0+3) (0+0)
Ruhpolding details	Germany; Andrea Henkel; Kati Wilhelm; Kathrin Hitzer; Magdalena Neuner	1:16:41.2 (0+0) (0+1) (0+2) (0+3)	Sweden; Sofia Domeij; Helena Jonsson; Anna Carin Olofsson; Anna Maria Nilsson	1:17:37.7 (0+0) (0+1) (0+3) (0+1)	China; Wang Chunli; Liu Xianying; Dong Xue; Song Chaoqing	1:19:02.3 (0+4) (0+3) (0+3) (0+4)
World Championships details	Russia; Svetlana Sleptsova; Anna Boulygina; Olga Medvedtseva; Olga Zaitseva	1:13:20.9 (0+2) (0+3) (0+3) (0+1)	Germany; Martina Beck; Magdalena Neuner; Andrea Henkel; Kati Wilhelm	1:14:28.0 (0+2) (2+5) (0+2) (1+5)	France; Marie-Laure Brunet; Sylvie Becaert; Marie Dorin; Sandrine Bailly	1:14:40.4 (0+1) (0+5) (0+3) (1+4)
Vancouver details	Germany; Kati Wilhelm; Magdalena Neuner; Martina Beck; Andrea Henkel	1:11:49.8 (0+1) (0+0) (0+5) (0+0)	China; Wang Chunli; Liu Xianying; Dong Xue; Liu Yuan-Yuan	1:13:05.0 (0+2) (0+2) (0+0) (0+1)	Russia; Svetlana Sleptsova; Anna Boulygina; Olga Medvedtseva; Olga Zaitseva	1:13:40.3 (0+5) (1+4) (0+1) (0+2)

== Final standings ==
#	Country	HOC1	HOC2	OBE	RUH	WCH	VAN	Total
1	Germany	~~48~~	60	54	60	54	60	288
2	France	54	54	48	38	48	~~36~~	242
3	Ukraine	43	43	60	43	~~0~~	43	232
4	China	36	~~31~~	43	48	36	54	217
5	Sweden	40	~~36~~	38	54	40	40	212
6	Norway	60	38	–	40	30	31	209
7	Poland	32	48	40	~~29~~	38	38	196
8	Belarus	38	40	36	36	43	~~34~~	193
9	Romania	~~27~~	34	31	32	34	29	160
10	Czech Republic	28	29	34	30	29	–	150
11	Kazakhstan	29	28	32	27	23	–	139
12	Italy	34	32	–	34	0	30	130
13	South Korea	22	24	–	26	24	27	123
14	Finland	31	30	–	28	26	–	115
15	Slovakia	25	27	–	31	28	–	111
16	United States	26	25	–	–	31	28	110
17	Russia	–	–	–	–	60	48	108
18	Latvia	23	26	–	25	21	–	95
19	Canada	30	–	–	–	32	32	94
20	United Kingdom	–	23	–	24	20	–	67
21	Bulgaria	24	–	–	–	22	–	46
22	Croatia	–	–	–	23	19	–	42
23	Estonia	–	–	–	–	27	–	27
24	Japan	–	–	–	–	25	–	25
