= 2008–09 Biathlon World Cup – Mass start Men =

The 2008-09 Biathlon World Cup/Mass start Men will start on January 11, 2009 in Oberhof and will finish on March 29, 2009 in Khanty-Mansiysk at the final event of the season. The defending titlist is Ole Einar Bjørndalen of Norway.

== Competition format ==
In the mass start, all biathletes start at the same time; the first across the finish line wins. In this 15 kilometres (9.3 mi) competition, the distance is skied over five laps; there are four bouts of shooting (two prone, two standing, in that order) with the first shooting bout being at the lane corresponding to your bib (Bib #10 shoots at lane #10 regardless of position in race). The rest of the shooting bouts are at the lane of the position they arrived (Arrive at the lane in fifth place, shoot at lane five). As in sprint races, competitors must ski one 150 m penalty loop for each miss. Here again, to avoid unwanted congestion, World Cup Mass starts are held with only the 30 top ranking athletes on the start line (half that of the Pursuit as here all contestants start simultaneously).

== 2007-08 Top 3 Standings ==
Medal	Athlete	Points
Gold:	(Norway) Ole Einar Bjørndalen	180
Silver:	(Russia) Nikolay Kruglov, Jr.	143
Bronze:	(Russia) Dmitri Yaroshenko	128

== Medal winners ==
Event:	Gold:	Time	Silver:	Time	Bronze:	Time
Oberhof details	Christoph Sumann; Austria	38:11.9 (1+0+1+0)	Carl Johan Bergman; Sweden	38:21.6 (0+0+1+1)	Ole Einar Bjørndalen; Norway	38:21.8 (0+1+1+0)
Antholz details	Christoph Stephan; Germany	37:19.9 (0+0+0+1)	Dominik Landertinger; Austria	37:20.1 (1+2+0+0)	Ivan Tcherezov; Russia	37:22.7 (0+0+1+1)
World Championships details	Dominik Landertinger; Austria	38:32.5 (2+0+0+1)	Christoph Sumann; Austria	38:41.4 (2+0+0+1)	Ivan Tcherezov; Russia	38:46.4 (2+0+0+0)
Trondheim details	Ole Einar Bjørndalen; Norway	41:12.9 (0+0+0+0)	Simon Eder; Austria	41:52.0 (0+0+1+0)	Emil Hegle Svendsen; Norway	42:06.3 (1+0+0+1)
Khanty-Mansiysk details	Simon Eder; Austria	37:14.4 (0+0+0+0)	Dominik Landertinger; Austria	37:26.5 (0+0+0+1)	Ole Einar Bjørndalen; Norway	37:31.4 (2+0+0+1)

== Final standings ==
#	Name	OBE	ANT	WCH	TRO	KHA	Total
1	(Austria) Dominik Landertinger	–	54	60	40	54	208
2	(Norway) Ole Einar Bjørndalen	48	~~40~~	43	60	48	199
3	(Austria) Christoph Sumann	60	43	54	~~18~~	40	197
4	(Austria) Simon Eder	–	28	34	54	60	176
5	(Russia) Ivan Tcherezov	–	48	48	43	31	170
6	(Germany) Christoph Stephan	~~19~~	60	20	38	28	146
7	(Norway) Emil Hegle Svendsen	43	–	29	48	26	146
8	(Russia) Maxim Tchoudov	40	38	36	28	~~23~~	142
9	(Sweden) Carl Johan Bergman	54	20	~~14~~	36	27	137
10	(Poland) Tomasz Sikora	28	36	38	~~25~~	32	134
11	(Germany) Michael Roesch	36	22	40	~~16~~	34	132
12	(France) Simon Fourcade	29	29	32	~~15~~	38	128
13	(Austria) Daniel Mesotitsch	25	34	~~16~~	26	29	114
14	(Ukraine) Andriy Deryzemlya	38	27	~~18~~	23	25	113
15	(Norway) Halvard Hanevold	34	15	28	~~14~~	36	113
16	(Sweden) Björn Ferry	27	26	–	27	30	110
17	(Russia) Andrei Makoveev	31	–	17	19	22	89
18	(Germany) Alexander Wolf	17	30	–	22	19	88
19	(Italy) Christian De Lorenzi	30	13	31	12	~~11~~	86
20	(France) Vincent Jay	26	–	–	32	24	82
21	(Italy) Markus Windisch	15	23	25	~~13~~	16	79
22	(Austria) Friedrich Pinter	–	25	–	31	21	77
23	(Norway) Alexander Os	12	31	–	20	13	76
24	(Norway) Lars Berger	24	18	~~12~~	21	12	75
25	(France) Martin Fourcade	–	–	26	29	18	73
26	(Germany) Michael Greis	–	24	0	34	14	72
27	(Belarus) Roman Valiullin	21	21	–	11	15	68
28	(Czech Republic) Michal Šlesingr	–	14	–	30	20	64
29	(Germany) Andreas Birnbacher	20	–	–	–	43	63
30	(United States) Tim Burke	–	–	13	17	17	47
31	(Canada) Jean Philippe Leguellec	–	19	–	24	–	43
32	(Russia) Nikolay Kruglov, Jr.	22	16	–	–	–	38
33	(Austria) Tobias Eberhard	–	32	–	–	–	32
35	(Belarus) Sergey Novikov	32	–	–	–	–	32
35	(Slovenia) Janez Maric	–	–	30	–	–	30
36	(United States) Jay Hakkinen	13	17	–	–	–	30
37	(Slovenia) Klemen Bauer	–	–	27	–	–	27
38	(Switzerland) Simon Hallenbarter	–	–	24	–	–	24
39	(Ukraine) Roman Pryma	23	–	–	–	–	23
39	(United States) Lowell Bailey	–	–	23	–	–	23
41	(Croatia) Jakov Fak	–	–	22	–	–	22
42	(Sweden) Mattias Nilsson	–	–	21	–	–	21
43	(Sweden) David Ekholm	–	–	19	–	–	19
44	(Norway) Ronny Hafsas	18	–	–	–	–	18
45	(France) Vincent Defrasne	16	0	–	–	–	16
46	(Sweden) Magnús Jónsson	–	–	15	–	–	15
47	(Ukraine) Vyacheslav Derkach	14	–	–	–	–	14
