= 2008–09 Biathlon World Cup =

Biathlon competition

Discipline	Men	Women
Overall	(Norway) Ole Einar Bjørndalen	(Sweden) Helena Jonsson
Nations Cup	Norway	Germany
Individual	(Germany) Michael Greis	(Germany) Magdalena Neuner
Sprint	(Norway) Ole Einar Bjørndalen	(Sweden) Helena Jonsson
Pursuit	(Norway) Ole Einar Bjørndalen	(Germany) Kati Wilhelm
Mass start	(Austria) Dominik Landertinger	(Sweden) Helena Jonsson
Relay	Austria	Germany

Competition

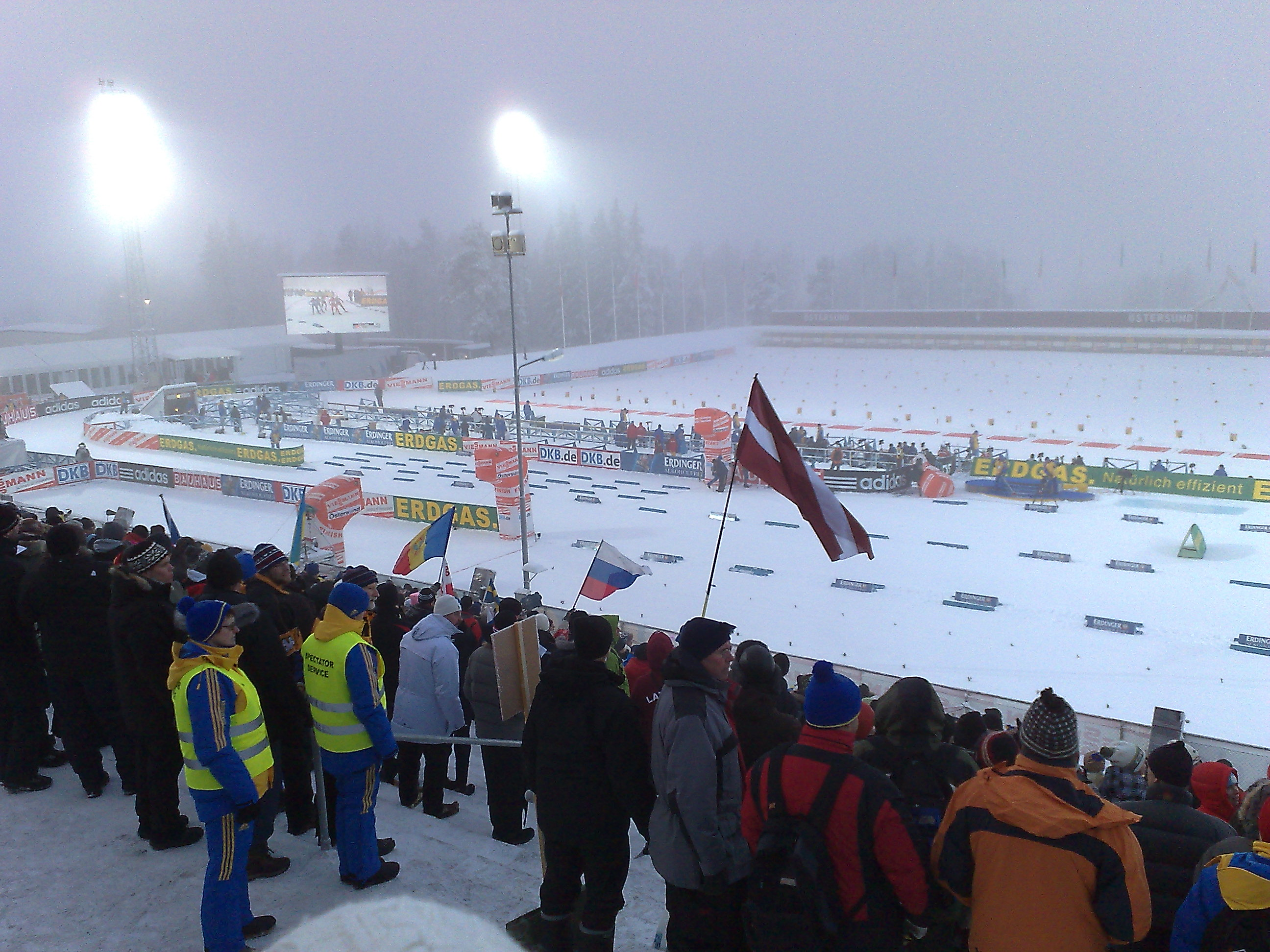
2008–09 World cup in Östersund

The 2008–09 Biathlon World Cup was a multi-race tournament over a season of biathlon, organised by the International Biathlon Union. The season started on 2 December 2008 in Östersund, Sweden and ends on 29 March 2009 in Khanty-Mansiysk, Russia.

== Calendar ==
Below is the World Cup calendar for the 2008–09 season.

Location	Date	Individual	Sprint	Pursuit	Mass start	Relay	Details
(Sweden) Östersund	2–7 December	●	●	●			details
(Austria) Hochfilzen	11–14 December		●	●		●	details
(Austria) Hochfilzen	17–21 December	●	●			●	details
(Germany) Oberhof	6–11 January		●		●	●	details
(Germany) Ruhpolding	13–18 January		●	●		●	details
(Italy) Antholz	22–25 January		●	●	●		details
(South Korea) Pyeongchang	13–22 February	●	●	●	●	●	World Championships
(Canada) Vancouver	10–15 March	●	●			●	details
(Norway) Trondheim	18–22 March		●	●	●		details
(Russia) Khanty-Mansiysk	25–29 March		●	●	●		details
Total		4	10	7	5	6	

== World Cup podiums ==
=== Men ===
Stage	Date	Place	Discipline	Winner	Second	Third	Yellow bib (After competition)	Det.
1	3 December 2008	(Sweden) Östersund	20 km Individual	(Germany) Michael Greis	(Norway) Alexander Os	(Norway) Emil Hegle Svendsen	(Germany) Michael Greis	Detail
1	6 December 2008	(Sweden) Östersund	10 km Sprint	(Norway) Emil Hegle Svendsen	(Poland) Tomasz Sikora	(France) Simon Fourcade	(Norway) Emil Hegle Svendsen	Detail
1	7 December 2008	(Sweden) Östersund	12.5 km Pursuit	(Poland) Tomasz Sikora	(Norway) Ole Einar Bjørndalen	(Norway) Emil Hegle Svendsen	(Norway) Emil Hegle Svendsen	Detail
2	12 December 2008	(Austria) Hochfilzen	10 km Sprint	(Norway) Emil Hegle Svendsen	(Russia) Ivan Tcherezov	(Norway) Alexander Os	(Norway) Emil Hegle Svendsen	Detail
2	13 December 2008	(Austria) Hochfilzen	12.5 km Pursuit	(Norway) Emil Hegle Svendsen	(Norway) Ole Einar Bjørndalen	(Poland) Tomasz Sikora	(Norway) Emil Hegle Svendsen	Detail
3	18 December 2008	(Austria) Hochfilzen	20 km Individual	(Russia) Maxim Tchoudov	(Russia) Ivan Tcherezov	(Sweden) Björn Ferry	(Norway) Emil Hegle Svendsen	Detail
3	20 December 2008	(Austria) Hochfilzen	10 km Sprint	(Norway) Lars Berger	(Norway) Alexander Os	(Sweden) Carl Johan Bergman	(Norway) Emil Hegle Svendsen	Detail
4	10 January 2009	(Germany) Oberhof	10 km Sprint	(Russia) Maxim Tchoudov	(Germany) Michael Rösch	(Poland) Tomasz Sikora	(Poland) Tomasz Sikora	Detail
4	11 January 2009	(Germany) Oberhof	15 km Mass Start	(Austria) Christoph Sumann	(Sweden) Carl Johan Bergman	(Norway) Ole Einar Bjørndalen	(Norway) Emil Hegle Svendsen	Detail
5	17 January 2009	(Germany) Ruhpolding	10 km Sprint	(Norway) Ole Einar Bjørndalen	(Austria) Dominik Landertinger	(Norway) Emil Hegle Svendsen	(Norway) Emil Hegle Svendsen	Detail
5	18 January 2009	(Germany) Ruhpolding	12.5 km Pursuit	(Norway) Ole Einar Bjørndalen	(Norway) Emil Hegle Svendsen	(Austria) Dominik Landertinger	(Norway) Emil Hegle Svendsen	Detail
6	23 January 2009	(Italy) Antholz-Anterselva	10 km Sprint	(Norway) Emil Hegle Svendsen	(Sweden) Björn Ferry	(Poland) Tomasz Sikora	(Norway) Emil Hegle Svendsen	Detail
6	24 January 2009	(Italy) Antholz-Anterselva	12.5 km Pursuit	(Sweden) Björn Ferry	(Austria) Simon Eder	(Norway) Emil Hegle Svendsen	(Norway) Emil Hegle Svendsen	Detail
6	25 January 2009	(Italy) Antholz-Anterselva	15 km Mass Start	(Germany) Christoph Stephan	(Austria) Dominik Landertinger	(Russia) Ivan Tcherezov	(Norway) Emil Hegle Svendsen	Detail
WC	14 February 2009	(South Korea) Pyeongchang	10 km Sprint	(Norway) Ole Einar Bjørndalen	(Norway) Lars Berger	(Norway) Halvard Hanevold	(Norway) Emil Hegle Svendsen	Detail
WC	15 February 2009	(South Korea) Pyeongchang	12.5 km Pursuit	(Norway) Ole Einar Bjørndalen	(Russia) Maxim Tchoudov	(Norway) Alexander Os	(Poland) Tomasz Sikora	Detail
WC	17 February 2009	(South Korea) Pyeongchang	20 km Individual	(Norway) Ole Einar Bjørndalen	(Germany) Christoph Stephan	(Croatia) Jakov Fak	(Poland) Tomasz Sikora	Detail
WC	21 February 2009	(South Korea) Pyeongchang	15 km Mass Start	(Austria) Dominik Landertinger	(Austria) Christoph Sumann	(Russia) Ivan Tcherezov	(Poland) Tomasz Sikora	Detail
7	11 March 2009	(Canada) Whistler	20 km Individual	(France) Vincent Jay	(Germany) Daniel Böhm	(United States) Jeremy Teela	(Poland) Tomasz Sikora	Detail
7	13 March 2009	(Canada) Whistler	10 km Sprint	(Norway) Lars Berger	(Norway) Ole Einar Bjørndalen	(Austria) Christoph Sumann	(Norway) Ole Einar Bjørndalen	Detail
8	19 March 2009	(Norway) Trondheim	10 km Sprint	(Germany) Michael Greis	(Norway) Ole Einar Bjørndalen	(Austria) Simon Eder	(Norway) Ole Einar Bjørndalen	Detail
8	21 March 2009	(Norway) Trondheim	12.5 km Pursuit	(Norway) Ole Einar Bjørndalen	(Austria) Simon Eder	(Poland) Tomasz Sikora	(Norway) Ole Einar Bjørndalen	Detail
8	22 March 2009	(Norway) Trondheim	15 km Mass Start	(Norway) Ole Einar Bjørndalen	(Austria) Simon Eder	(Norway) Emil Hegle Svendsen	(Norway) Ole Einar Bjørndalen	Detail
9	26 March 2009	(Russia) Khanty-Mansiysk	10 km Sprint	(Germany) Arnd Peiffer	(Norway) Ole Einar Bjørndalen	(Austria) Christoph Sumann	(Norway) Ole Einar Bjørndalen	Detail
9	28 March 2009	(Russia) Khanty-Mansiysk	12.5 km Pursuit	(Norway) Emil Hegle Svendsen	(Norway) Ole Einar Bjørndalen	(Austria) Christoph Sumann	(Norway) Ole Einar Bjørndalen	Detail
9	29 March 2009	(Russia) Khanty-Mansiysk	15 km Mass Start	(Austria) Simon Eder	(Austria) Dominik Landertinger	(Norway) Ole Einar Bjørndalen	(Norway) Ole Einar Bjørndalen	Detail

=== Women ===
Stage	Date	Place	Discipline	Winner	Second	Third	Yellow bib (After competition)	Det.
1	4 December 2008	(Sweden) Östersund	15 km Individual	(Sweden) Helena Jonsson	(Germany) Kati Wilhelm	(Germany) Magdalena Neuner	(Sweden) Helena Jonsson	Detail
1	6 December 2008	(Sweden) Östersund	7.5 km Sprint	(China) Wang Chunli	(Norway) Tora Berger	(Germany) Magdalena Neuner	(Germany) Magdalena Neuner	Detail
1	7 December 2008	(Sweden) Östersund	10 km Pursuit	(Germany) Martina Beck	(Russia) Svetlana Sleptsova	(Germany) Kati Wilhelm	(Germany) Kati Wilhelm	Detail
2	12 December 2008	(Austria) Hochfilzen	7.5 km Sprint	(Germany) Simone Hauswald	(Russia) Svetlana Sleptsova	(Germany) Andrea Henkel	(Norway) Tora Berger	Detail
2	13 December 2008	(Austria) Hochfilzen	10 km Pursuit	(Germany) Martina Beck	(Russia) Svetlana Sleptsova	(Germany) Simone Hauswald	(Germany) Martina Beck	Detail
3	18 December 2008	(Austria) Hochfilzen	15 km Individual	(Romania) Éva Tófalvi	(Russia) Svetlana Sleptsova	(Germany) Simone Hauswald	(Russia) Svetlana Sleptsova	Detail
3	20 December 2008	(Austria) Hochfilzen	7.5 km Sprint	(Russia) Svetlana Sleptsova	(Ukraine) Vita Semerenko	(Sweden) Helena Jonsson	(Russia) Svetlana Sleptsova	Detail
4	9 January 2009	(Germany) Oberhof	7.5 km Sprint	(Germany) Andrea Henkel	(Sweden) Helena Jonsson	(Norway) Tora Berger	(Russia) Svetlana Sleptsova	Detail
4	11 January 2009	(Germany) Oberhof	12.5 km Mass Start	(Germany) Kati Wilhelm	(Russia) Olga Medvedtseva	(Sweden) Helena Jonsson	(Russia) Svetlana Sleptsova	Detail
5	16 January 2009	(Germany) Ruhpolding	7.5 km Sprint	(Germany) Magdalena Neuner	(Germany) Kati Wilhelm	(Belarus) Darya Domracheva	(Russia) Svetlana Sleptsova	Detail
5	18 January 2009	(Germany) Ruhpolding	10 km Pursuit	(Germany) Magdalena Neuner	(Germany) Kati Wilhelm	(Norway) Tora Berger	(Russia) Svetlana Sleptsova	Detail
6	22 January 2009	(Italy) Antholz-Anterselva	7.5 km Sprint	(Norway) Tora Berger	(Belarus) Darya Domracheva	(Germany) Kati Wilhelm	(Russia) Svetlana Sleptsova	Detail
6	24 January 2009	(Italy) Antholz-Anterselva	10 km Pursuit	(Russia) Anna Boulygina	(Finland) Kaisa Mäkäräinen	(Belarus) Darya Domracheva	(Russia) Svetlana Sleptsova	Detail
6	25 January 2009	(Italy) Antholz-Anterselva	12.5 km Mass Start	(Sweden) Helena Jonsson	(Finland) Kaisa Mäkäräinen	(Germany) Kati Wilhelm	(Germany) Kati Wilhelm	Detail
WC	14 February 2009	(South Korea) Pyeongchang	7.5 km Sprint	(Germany) Kati Wilhelm	(Germany) Simone Hauswald	(Russia) Olga Zaitseva	(Germany) Kati Wilhelm	Detail
WC	15 February 2009	(South Korea) Pyeongchang	10 km Pursuit	(Sweden) Helena Jonsson	(Germany) Kati Wilhelm	(Russia) Olga Zaitseva	(Germany) Kati Wilhelm	Detail
WC	18 February 2009	(South Korea) Pyeongchang	15 km Individual	(Germany) Kati Wilhelm	(Slovenia) Teja Gregorin	(Norway) Tora Berger	(Germany) Kati Wilhelm	Detail
WC	22 February 2009	(South Korea) Pyeongchang	12.5 km Mass Start	(Russia) Olga Zaitseva	(Slovakia) Anastasiya Kuzmina	(Sweden) Helena Jonsson	(Germany) Kati Wilhelm	Detail
7	11 March 2009	(Canada) Whistler	15 km Individual	(Germany) Simone Hauswald	(Russia) Olga Zaitseva	(Ukraine) Vita Semerenko	(Germany) Kati Wilhelm	Detail
7	13 March 2009	(Canada) Whistler	7.5 km Sprint	(Sweden) Helena Jonsson	(Germany) Magdalena Neuner	(Russia) Olga Zaitseva	(Germany) Kati Wilhelm	Detail
8	19 March 2009	(Norway) Trondheim	7.5 km Sprint	(Russia) Olga Zaitseva	(Sweden) Helena Jonsson	(France) Sylvie Becaert	(Sweden) Helena Jonsson	Detail
8	21 March 2009	(Norway) Trondheim	10 km Pursuit	(Germany) Andrea Henkel	(Russia) Olga Zaitseva	(France) Marie-Laure Brunet	(Germany) Kati Wilhelm	Detail
8	22 March 2009	(Norway) Trondheim	12.5 km Mass Start	(Norway) Tora Berger	(Germany) Simone Hauswald	(France) Sandrine Bailly	(Germany) Kati Wilhelm	Detail
9	27 March 2009	(Russia) Khanty-Mansiysk	7.5 km Sprint	(Germany) Tina Bachmann	(Germany) Simone Hauswald	(Sweden) Anna Carin Olofsson-Zidek	(Germany) Kati Wilhelm	Detail
9	28 March 2009	(Russia) Khanty-Mansiysk	10 km Pursuit	(Germany) Magdalena Neuner	(Italy) Michela Ponza	(France) Marie Dorin	(Germany) Kati Wilhelm	Detail
9	29 March 2009	(Russia) Khanty-Mansiysk	12.5 km Mass Start	(Germany) Simone Hauswald	(Sweden) Helena Jonsson	(Germany) Andrea Henkel	(Sweden) Helena Jonsson	Detail

=== Men's team ===
Event	Date	Place	Discipline	Winner	Second	Third
2	14 December 2008	(Austria) Hochfilzen	4x7.5 km Relay	Russia Ivan Tcherezov; Maxim Tchoudov; Maxim Maksimov; Nikolay Kruglov	Austria Daniel Mesotitsch; Friedrich Pinter; Dominik Landertinger; Christoph Sumann	Ukraine Vyacheslav Derkach; Andriy Deryzemlya; Oleh Berezhnyi; Serhiy Sednev
3	21 December 2008	(Austria) Hochfilzen	4x7.5 km Relay	Austria Daniel Mesotitsch; Friedrich Pinter; Tobias Eberhard; Christoph Sumann	Sweden Magnus Jonsson; Mattias Nilsson; Björn Ferry; Carl Johan Bergman	France Vincent Jay; Vincent Defrasne; Jean-Guillaume Béatrix; Simon Fourcade
4	8 January 2009	(Germany) Oberhof	4x7.5 km Relay	Austria Daniel Mesotitsch; Friedrich Pinter; Dominik Landertinger; Christoph Sumann	Germany Michael Greis; Michael Rösch; Arnd Peiffer; Toni Lang	Norway Emil Hegle Svendsen; Rune Brattsveen; Halvard Hanevold; Ole Einar Bjørndalen
5	15 January 2009	(Germany) Ruhpolding	4x7.5 km Relay	Norway Emil Hegle Svendsen; Alexander Os; Halvard Hanevold; Ole Einar Bjørndalen	Germany Michael Rösch; Christoph Stephan; Arnd Peiffer; Toni Lang	Austria Daniel Mesotitsch; Friedrich Pinter; Tobias Eberhard; Christoph Sumann
WC	16 February 2009	(South Korea) Pyeongchang	4x7.5 km Relay	Norway Emil Hegle Svendsen; Lars Berger; Halvard Hanevold; Ole Einar Bjørndalen	Austria Daniel Mesotitsch; Simon Eder; Dominik Landertinger; Christoph Sumann	Germany Michael Rösch; Christoph Stephan; Arnd Peiffer; Michael Greis
7	15 March 2009	(Canada) Vancouver	4x7.5 km Relay	Sweden David Ekholm; Mattias Nilsson; Fredrik Lindström; Carl Johan Bergman	France Vincent Jay; Vincent Defrasne; Martin Fourcade; Simon Fourcade	Germany Simon Schempp; Daniel Böhm; Arnd Peiffer; Michael Rösch

=== Women's team ===
Event	Date	Place	Discipline	Winner	Second	Third
2	14 December 2008	(Austria) Hochfilzen	4x6 km Relay	Norway Solveig Rogstad; Julie Bonnevie-Svendsen; Ann Kristin Flatland; Tora Berger	France Marie-Laure Brunet; Sylvie Becaert; Julie Carraz; Sandrine Bailly	Germany Andrea Henkel; Martina Beck; Simone Hauswald; Kati Wilhelm
3	21 December 2008	(Austria) Hochfilzen	4x6 km Relay	Germany Andrea Henkel; Simone Hauswald; Magdalena Neuner; Kathrin Hitzer	France Marie-Laure Brunet; Sylvie Becaert; Julie Carraz; Sandrine Bailly	Poland Krystyna Palka; Magdalena Gwizdon; Weronika Nowakowska; Agnieszka Cyl
4	7 January 2009	(Germany) Oberhof	4x6 km Relay	Ukraine Olena Pidhrushna; Valj Semerenko; Vita Semerenko; Oksana Khvostenko	Germany Simone Hauswald; Kati Wilhelm; Sabrina Buchholz; Kathrin Hitzer	France Marie-Laure Brunet; Sylvie Becaert; Pauline Macabies; Marie Dorin
5	14 January 2009	(Germany) Ruhpolding	4x6 km Relay	Germany Andrea Henkel; Kati Wilhelm; Kathrin Hitzer; Magdalena Neuner	Sweden Sofia Domeij; Helena Jonsson; Anna Carin Zidek; Anna Maria Nilsson	China Wang Chunli; Liu Xianying; Dong Xue; Song Chaoqing
WC	21 February 2009	(South Korea) Pyeongchang	4x6 km Relay	Russia Svetlana Sleptsova; Anna Boulygina; Olga Medvedtseva; Olga Zaitseva	Germany Martina Beck; Magdalena Neuner; Andrea Henkel; Kati Wilhelm	France Marie-Laure Brunet; Sylvie Becaert; Marie Dorin; Sandrine Bailly
7	14 March 2009	(Canada) Vancouver	4x6 km Relay	Germany Kati Wilhelm; Magdalena Neuner; Martina Beck; Andrea Henkel	China Wang Chunli; Liu Xianying; Dong Xue; Liu Yuanyuan	Russia Svetlana Sleptsova; Anna Boulygina; Olga Medvedtseva; Olga Zaitseva

=== Mixed ===
Event	Date	Place	Discipline	Winner	Second	Third
WC	19 February 2009	(South Korea) Pyeongchang	2x6 km + 2x7.5 km Mixed Relay	France Marie-Laure Brunet; Sylvie Becaert; Vincent Defrasne; Simon Fourcade	Sweden Helena Jonsson; Anna Carin Zidek; David Ekholm; Carl Johan Bergman	Germany Andrea Henkel; Simone Hauswald; Arnd Peiffer; Michael Greis

== Standings: Men ==
=== Overall ===
Pos.		Points
1.	(Norway) Ole Einar Bjørndalen	1080
2.	(Poland) Tomasz Sikora	870
3.	(Norway) Emil Hegle Svendsen	844
4.	(Germany) Michael Greis	804
5.	(Russia) Maxim Tchoudov	780

- Final standings after 26 races.

=== Individual ===
Pos.		Points
1.	(Germany) Michael Greis	146
2.	(Russia) Ivan Tcherezov	120
3.	(Russia) Maxim Tchoudov	119
4.	(Norway) Ole Einar Bjørndalen	110
5.	(Austria) Christoph Sumann	100

- Final standings after 4 races.

=== Sprint ===
Pos.		Points
1.	(Norway) Ole Einar Bjørndalen	372
2.	(Poland) Tomasz Sikora	337
3.	(Norway) Emil Hegle Svendsen	318
4.	(Germany) Michael Greis	306
5.	(Russia) Maxim Tchoudov	297

- Final standings after 10 races.

=== Pursuit ===
Pos.		Points
1.	(Norway) Ole Einar Bjørndalen	342
2.	(Norway) Emil Hegle Svendsen	308
3.	(Poland) Tomasz Sikora	276
4.	(Germany) Michael Greis	231
5.	(Sweden) Björn Ferry	215

- Final standings after 7 races.

=== Mass start ===
Pos.		Points
1.	(Austria) Dominik Landertinger	208
2.	(Norway) Ole Einar Bjørndalen	199
3.	(Austria) Christoph Sumann	197
4.	(Austria) Simon Eder	176
5.	(Russia) Ivan Tcherezov	170

- Final standings after 5 races.

=== Relay ===
Pos.		Points
1.	Austria	276
2.	Norway	254
3.	Germany	247
4.	France	226
5.	Sweden	220

- Final standings after 6 races.

=== Nation ===
Pos.		Points
1.	Norway	6795
2.	Austria	6446
3.	Germany	6413
4.	Sweden	5908
5.	France	5794

- Final standings after 20 races.

== Standings: Women ==
=== Overall ===
Pos.		Points
1.	(Sweden) Helena Jonsson	952
2.	(Germany) Kati Wilhelm	952
3.	(Norway) Tora Berger	894
4.	(Germany) Magdalena Neuner	891
5.	(Germany) Andrea Henkel	838

- Final standings after 26 races.

=== Individual ===
Pos.		Points
1.	(Germany) Magdalena Neuner	129
2.	(Romania) Éva Tófalvi	123
3.	(Norway) Tora Berger	122
4.	(Germany) Kati Wilhelm	115
5.	(Russia) Olga Zaitseva	113

- Final standings after 4 races.

=== Sprint ===
Pos.		Points
1.	(Sweden) Helena Jonsson	372
2.	(Germany) Magdalena Neuner	358
3.	(Norway) Tora Berger	352
4.	(Germany) Kati Wilhelm	347
5.	(Belarus) Darya Domracheva	329

- Final standings after 10 races.

=== Pursuit ===
Pos.		Points
1.	(Germany) Kati Wilhelm	272
2.	(Norway) Tora Berger	246
3.	(Germany) Martina Beck	244
4.	(Germany) Andrea Henkel	234
5.	(Germany) Magdalena Neuner	231

- Final standings after 7 races.

=== Mass start ===
Pos.		Points
1.	(Sweden) Helena Jonsson	210
2.	(Germany) Kati Wilhelm	186
3.	(Germany) Simone Hauswald	174
4.	(Russia) Olga Zaitseva	162
5.	(Germany) Andrea Henkel	157

- Final standings after 5 races.

=== Relay ===
Pos.		Points
1.	Germany	288
2.	France	242
3.	Ukraine	232
4.	Republic of China	217
5.	Sweden	212

- Final standings after 6 races.

=== Nation ===
Pos.		Points
1.	Germany	6954
2.	Sweden	5926
3.	France	5925
4.	Ukraine	5894
5.	Norway	5827

- Final standings after 20 races.

== Medal table ==
Rank	Nation	Gold	Silver	Bronze	Total
1	Germany	21	15	13	49
2	Norway	19	11	14	44
3	Russia	8	10	6	24
4	Sweden	6	8	6	20
5	Austria	5	9	6	20
6	France	2	3	8	13
7	Poland	1	1	5	7
8	Ukraine	1	1	2	4
9	China	1	1	1	3
10	Romania	1	0	0	1
11	Finland	0	2	0	2
12	Belarus	0	1	2	3
13	Italy	0	1	0	1
13	Slovakia	0	1	0	1
13	Slovenia	0	1	0	1
16	Croatia	0	0	1	1
16	United States	0	0	1	1
Totals (17 entries)		65	65	65	195

== Achievements ==
First World Cup career victory

- Wang Chunli (CHN), 25, in her 3rd season — the WC 1 Sprint in Östersund; also her first individual podium
- Simone Hauswald (GER), 29, in her 9th season — the WC 2 Sprint in Hochfilzen; first podium was 2004-05 Pursuit in Antholz-Anterselva
- Éva Tófalvi (ROU), 30, in her 13th season — the WC 3 Individual in Hochfilzen; also her first individual podium
- Anna Boulygina (RUS), 25, in her 3rd season — the WC 6 Pursuit in Antholz-Anterselva; also her first individual podium
- Christoph Stephan (GER), 23, in his 4th season — the WC 6 Mass Start in Antholz-Anterselva; also his first individual podium
- Dominik Landertinger (AUT), 20, in his 2nd season — the WCh Mass Start in Pyeong Chang; first podium was 2008-09 Sprint in Ruhpolding
- Vincent Jay (FRA), 23, in his 4th season — the WC 7 Individual in Vancouver; also his first individual podium
- Arnd Peiffer (GER), 22, in his 1st season — the WC 9 Sprint in Khanty-Mansiysk; also his first individual podium
- Tina Bachmann (GER), 22, in her 1st season — the WC 9 Sprint in Khanty-Mansiysk; also her first individual podium
- Simon Eder (AUT), 25, in his 6th season — the WC 9 Mass Start in Khanty-Mansiysk; first podium was 2008-09 Pursuit in Antholz-Anterselva

First World Cup podium

- Vita Semerenko (UKR), 22, in her 3rd season — no. 2 in the WC 3 Sprint in Hochfilzen
- Darya Domracheva (BLR), 22, in her 3rd season — no. 3 in the WC 5 Sprint in Ruhpolding
- Jakov Fak (CRO), 21, in his 3rd season — no. 3 in the WCh Individual in Pyeong Chang
- Teja Gregorin (SLO), 28, in her 6th season — no. 2 in the WCh Individual in Pyeong Chang
- Anastasiya Kuzmina (SVK), 24, in her 2nd season — no. 2 in the WCh Mass Start in Pyeong Chang
- Daniel Bohm (GER), 22, in his 1st season — no. 2 in the WC 7 Individual in Vancouver
- Jeremy Teela (USA), 32, in his 13th season — no. 3 in the WC 7 Individual in Vancouver
- Marie-Laure Brunet (FRA), 20, in her 2nd season — no. 3 in the WC 8 Pursuit in Trondheim
- Marie Dorin (FRA), 22, in her 2nd season — no. 3 in the WC 9 Pursuit in Khanty-Mansiysk

Victory in this World Cup (all-time number of victories in parentheses)

Men

- Ole Einar Bjørndalen (NOR), 7 (88) first places
- Emil Hegle Svendsen (NOR), 5 (11) first places
- Michael Greis (GER), 2 (11) first places
- Lars Berger (NOR), 2 (5) first places
- Maxim Tchoudov (RUS), 2 (4) first places
- Tomasz Sikora (POL), 1 (5) first place
- Christoph Sumann (AUT), 1 (4) first place
- Björn Ferry (SWE), 1 (2) first place
- Christoph Stephan (GER), 1 (1) first place
- Dominik Landertinger (AUT), 1 (1) first place
- Vincent Jay (FRA), 1 (1) first place
- Arnd Peiffer (GER), 1 (1) first place
- Simon Eder (AUT), 1 (1) first place

Women

- Helena Jonsson (SWE), 4 (5) first places
- Kati Wilhelm (GER), 3 (21) first places
- Magdalena Neuner (GER), 3 (14) first places
- Simone Hauswald (GER), 3 (3) first places
- Andrea Henkel (GER), 2 (16) first places
- Martina Beck (GER), 2 (15) first places
- Olga Zaitseva (RUS), 2 (8) first places
- Tora Berger (NOR), 2 (4) first places
- Svetlana Sleptsova (RUS), 1 (4) first place
- Wang Chunli (CHN), 1 (1) first place
- Éva Tófalvi (ROU), 1 (1) first place
- Anna Boulygina (RUS), 1 (1) first place
- Tina Bachmann (GER), 1 (1) first place

== Retirements ==
Following notable biathletes retired after the 2008–09 season:

- Olegs Maluhins (LAT)
- Stian Eckhoff (NOR)
- Mikhail Kochkin (RUS)
- Pavlina Filipova (BUL)
- Romy Beer (GER)
- Albina Akhatova (RUS)
- Olga Anisimova (RUS)
- Oksana Neupokoeva (RUS)
- Tetiana Rud (UKR)
