= 2008–09 Biathlon World Cup – Individual Women =

The 2008–09 Biathlon World Cup/Individual Women started on Thursday December 4, 2008 in Östersund and finished Wednesday March 11, 2009 in Vancouver at the pre-Olympic biathlon event. The defending titlist was Martina Beck of Germany.

== Competition format ==
The format consists of a 15 kilometre (9.3 mi) individual race and is the oldest biathlon event; the distance is skied over five laps. The biathlete shoots four times at any shooting lane, in the order of prone, standing, prone, standing, totalling 20 targets. For each missed target a fixed penalty time, usually one minute, is added to the skiing time of the biathlete. Competitors' starts are staggered, normally by 30 seconds.

== 2007–2008 Top 3 Standings ==
| Medal | Athlete | Points |
|---|---|---|
| Gold: | (Germany) Martina Beck | 139 |
| Silver: | (Russia) Tatiana Moiseeva | 111 |
| Bronze: | (Russia) Ekaterina Iourieva | 107 |

== Medal winners ==
| Event: | Gold: | Time | Silver: | Time | Bronze: | Time |
|---|---|---|---|---|---|---|
| Östersund details | Helena Jonsson; Sweden | 45:05.1 (0+0+0+0) | Kati Wilhelm; Germany | 45:44.8 (1+0+0+0) | Magdalena Neuner; Germany | 46:20.5 (0+0+0+1) |
| Hochfilzen details | Éva Tófalvi; Romania | 50:20.5 (0+0+0+0) | Svetlana Sleptsova; Russia | 50:52.9 (0+1+0+1) | Simone Hauswald; Germany | 52:13.3 (0+2+0+1) |
| World Championships details | Kati Wilhelm; Germany | 44:03.1 (0+1+0+0) | Teja Gregorin; Slovenia | 44:42.6 (0+0+0+1) | Tora Berger; Norway | 44:49.6 (0+0+0+1) |
| Vancouver details | Simone Hauswald; Germany | 42:44.6 (0+0+0+0) | Olga Zaitseva; Russia | 43:23.9 (0+0+0+1) | Vita Semerenko; Ukraine | 43:50.4 (0+0+1+0) |

== Final standings ==
| # | Name | ÖST | HOC | WCH | VAN | Total |
|---|---|---|---|---|---|---|
| 1. | (Germany) Magdalena Neuner | 48 | 38 | – | 43 | 129 |
| 2 | (Romania) Éva Tófalvi | ~~6~~ | 60 | 36 | 27 | 123 |
| 3 | (Norway) Tora Berger | 38 | – | 48 | 36 | 122 |
| 4 | (Germany) Kati Wilhelm | 54 | – | 60 | 1 | 115 |
| 5 | (Russia) Olga Zaitseva | ~~13~~ | 32 | 27 | 54 | 113 |
| 6 | (Sweden) Helena Jonsson | 60 | ~~14~~ | 34 | 17 | 111 |
| 7 | (Ukraine) Vita Semerenko | 34 | ~~20~~ | 29 | 48 | 111 |
| 8 | (Germany) Simone Hauswald | – | 48 | – | 60 | 108 |
| 9 | (Germany) Andrea Henkel | 31 | ~~9~~ | 31 | 40 | 102 |
| 10 | (Ukraine) Oksana Khvostenko | 43 | 27 | ~~20~~ | 29 | 99 |
| 11 | (Sweden) Anna Carin Olofsson | 29 | 23 | 43 | ~~0~~ | 95 |
| 12 | (Russia) Svetlana Sleptsova | 23 | 54 | – | 16 | 94 |
| 13 | (China) Liu Xianying | 40 | 34 | ~~0~~ | 18 | 92 |
| 14 | (Belarus) Darya Domracheva | 32 | 25 | 30 | – | 87 |
| 15 | (Slovenia) Teja Gregorin | 3 | – | 54 | 26 | 83 |
| 16 | (Germany) Martina Beck | 36 | 28 | ~~13~~ | 19 | 83 |
| 17 | (France) Sandrine Bailly | ~~0~~ | 10 | 32 | 38 | 80 |
| 18 | (Norway) Anne Ingstadbjoerg | 30 | 16 | ~~15~~ | 28 | 74 |
| 19 | (Italy) Katja Haller | 12 | 33 | 24 | ~~0~~ | 67 |
| 20 | (Russia) Olga Medvedtseva | ~~0~~ | 43 | 22 | 0 | 65 |
| 21 | (Belarus) Nadezhda Skardino | 25 | 29 | 9 | ~~8~~ | 63 |
| 22 | (Moldova) Natalia Levchenkova | 27 | ~~0~~ | 23 | 11 | 61 |
| 23 | (Poland) Weronika Novakowska | 21 | – | 5 | 34 | 60 |
| 24 | (Italy) Michela Ponza | 8 | 19 | ~~3~~ | 31 | 58 |
| 25 | (Ukraine) Valj Semerenko | 16 | ~~0~~ | 15 | 25 | 56 |
| 26 | (France) Marie-Laure Brunet | 22 | – | 26 | – | 48 |
| 27 | (Finland) Kaisa Mäkäräinen | 0 | 36 | 11 | – | 47 |
| 28 | (Ukraine) Olena Pidrushna | 14 | ~~0~~ | 25 | 7 | 46 |
| 29 | (Norway) Solveig Rogstad | 5 | 40 | 0 | ~~0~~ | 45 |
| 30 | (Slovakia) Anastasiya Kuzmina | – | – | 12 | 32 | 44 |
| 31 | (Poland) Agnieszka Grzybek | – | 21 | 21 | 0 | 42 |
| 32 | (Estonia) Eveli Saue | 0 | 11 | ~~0~~ | 30 | 41 |
| 33 | (Czech Republic) Veronika Vítková | – | 0 | 40 | – | 40 |
| 34 | (Slovenia) Andreja Mali | ~~0~~ | 26 | 0 | 13 | 39 |
| 35 | (France) Sylvie Becaert | ~~0~~ | 0 | 19 | 20 | 39 |
| 36 | (Kazakhstan) Elena Khrustaleva | 0 | 0 | 38 | – | 38 |
| 37 | (Bulgaria) Pavlina Filipova | 9 | 0 | 28 | – | 37 |
| 38 | (Germany) Anne Preussler | 17 | 18 | – | – | 35 |
| 39 | (China) Wang Chunli | 0 | 30 | ~~0~~ | 4 | 34 |
| 40 | (China) Kong Yingchao | 10 | 24 | – | – | 34 |
| 41 | (Russia) Iana Romanova | – | – | 17 | 15 | 32 |
| 42 | (Russia) Oksana Neupokoeva | – | 17 | – | 13 | 30 |
| 43 | (Latvia) Madara Liduma | 19 | ~~0~~ | 10 | 0 | 29 |
| 44 | (Norway) Julie Bonnevie-Svendsen | 28 | 0 | – | – | 28 |
| 45 | (Norway) Liv Kjersti Eikeland | 26 | 0 | – | 0 | 26 |
| 46 | (Poland) Paulina Bobak | 0 | 22 | 4 | – | 26 |
| 47 | (Ukraine) Lilia Vaygina-Efremova | 20 | 6 | – | – | 26 |
| 48 | (Czech Republic) Magda Rezlerova | 18 | 7 | 0 | ~~0~~ | 25 |
| 49 | (France) Pauline Macabies | 0 | 0 | – | 24 | 24 |
| 50 | (Sweden) Jenny Jonsson | 0 | 0 | – | 23 | 23 |
| 51 | (Belarus) Liudmila Ananko | 23 | 0 | – | – | 23 |
| 52 | (France) Julie Carraz-Collin | 0 | 1 | – | 22 | 23 |
| 53 | (France) Marie Dorin | 0 | ~~0~~ | 8 | 14 | 22 |
| 54 | (Germany) Juliane Doll | – | – | – | 21 | 21 |
| 55 | (Russia) Anna Boulygina | 4 | – | 16 | 0 | 20 |
| 56 | (United States) Haley Johnson | 0 | ~~0~~ | 18 | 0 | 18 |
| 57 | (Germany) Kathrin Hitzer | 3 | 15 | 0 | – | 18 |
| 58 | (China) Dong Xue | 11 | 5 | 0 | ~~0~~ | 16 |
| 59 | (Belarus) Olga Nazarova | ~~0~~ | 2 | 8 | 6 | 16 |
| 60 | (Belarus) Olga Kudrashova | 15 | 0 | ~~0~~ | 0 | 15 |
| 61 | (Lithuania) Diana Rasimovičiūtė | ~~0~~ | 12 | 0 | 3 | 15 |
| 62 | (Sweden) Anna Maria Nilsson | ~~0~~ | 13 | 0 | 0 | 13 |
| 63 | (Slovakia) Lubomira Kalinova | 0 | ~~0~~ | 0 | 10 | 10 |
| 64 | (Czech Republic) Zdenka Vejnarova | 0 | ~~0~~ | 0 | 9 | 9 |
| 65 | (Norway) Ann Kristin Flatland | – | 8 | 0 | – | 8 |
| 66 | (Sweden) Sofia Domeij | 7 | 0 | 0 | ~~0~~ | 7 |
| 67 | (Canada) Zina Kocher | ~~0~~ | 0 | 6 | 0 | 6 |
| 68 | (Norway) Kari Henneseid Eie | 0 | 0 | – | 5 | 5 |
| 69 | (Estonia) Kadri Lehtla | 0 | 4 | 0 | – | 4 |
| 70 | (China) Song Chaoqing | 0 | 3 | – | 0 | 3 |
| 71 | (Belarus) Liudmila Kalinchik | 0 | 0 | – | 2 | 2 |
| 72 | (Croatia) Andrijana Stipanicic | – | 0 | 2 | 0 | 2 |
| 73 | (Poland) Magdalena Gwizdoń | ~~0~~ | 0 | 1 | 0 | 1 |
| 74 | (Germany) Sabrina Buchholz | 1 | – | – | – | 1 |
