= 2008–09 Biathlon World Cup – Individual Men =

The 2008-09 Biathlon World Cup/Individual Men started at Wednesday, December 3, 2008, in Östersund and ended on Wednesday, March 11, 2009, in Vancouver at the pre-olympic Biathlon event. Defending titlist was Vincent Defrasne of France.

== Competition format ==
The 20 kilometres (12 mi) individual race is the oldest biathlon event; the distance is skied over five laps. The biathlete shoots four times at any shooting lane, in the order of prone, standing, prone, standing, totalling 20 targets. For each missed target a fixed penalty time, usually one minute, is added to the skiing time of the biathlete. Competitors' starts are staggered, normally by 30 seconds.

== 2007-08 Top 3 Standings ==
Medal	Athlete	Points
Gold:	(France) Vincent Defrasne	104
Silver:	(Norway) Emil Hegle Svendsen	100
Bronze:	(Norway) Halvard Hanevold	82

== Medal winners ==
Event:	Gold:	Time	Silver:	Time	Bronze:	Time
Östersund details	Michael Greis; Germany	58:52.5 (0+1+0+0)	Alexander Os; Norway	59:43.0 (0+0+0+2)	Emil Hegle Svendsen; Norway	59:47.5 (0+2+0+0)
Hochfilzen details	Maxim Tchoudov; Russia	56:00.3 (0+1+0+0)	Ivan Tcherezov; Russia	56:47.9 (0+0+2+0)	Björn Ferry; Sweden	56:48.8 (0+0+1+0)
World Championships details	Ole Einar Bjørndalen; Norway	52:28.0 (0+0+2+1)	Christoph Stephan; Germany	52:42.1 (1+0+0+0)	Jakov Fak; Croatia	52:45.1 (0+0+0+1)
Vancouver details	Vincent Jay; France	49:53.9 (0+0+0+0)	Daniel Böhm; Germany	50:12.9 (0+1+0+0)	Jeremy Teela; United States	50:17.2 (0+1+0+0)

== Final standings ==
#	Name	ÖST	HOC	WCH	VAN	Total
1.	(Germany) Michael Greis	60	43	~~22~~	43	146
2	(Russia) Ivan Tcherezov	30	54	36	~~22~~	120
3	(Russia) Maxim Tchoudov	28	60	33	~~26~~	119
4	(Norway) Ole Einar Bjørndalen	~~17~~	27	60	23	110
5	(Austria) Christoph Sumann	34	38	~~24~~	28	100
6	(Sweden) Carl Johan Bergman	32	34	–	32	98
7	(Austria) Daniel Mesotitsch	40	36	21	~~0~~	97
8	(France) Vincent Jay	13	~~0~~	18	60	91
9	(Poland) Tomasz Sikora	29	~~22~~	32	30	91
10	(Ukraine) Andriy Deryzemlya	38	~~0~~	34	10	82
11	(Norway) Alexander Os	54	10	13	~~0~~	77
12	(Croatia) Jakov Fak	0	26	48	~~0~~	74
13	(Ukraine) Serguei Sednev	43	18	~~0~~	13	74
14	(Sweden) Björn Ferry	24	48	–	–	72
14	(Norway) Emil Hegle Svendsen	48	24	–	–	72
16	(Germany) Alexander Wolf	14	30	~~11~~	27	71
17	(Norway) Frode Andresen	25	–	–	38	63
18	(France) Vincent Defrasne	~~0~~	7	20	34	61
19	(Germany) Michael Rösch	21	~~13~~	23	15	59
20	(Ukraine) Olexander Bilanenko	2	31	25	~~0~~	58
21	(Ukraine) Vyacheslav Derkach	31	8	–	16	55
22	(Germany) Christoph Stephan	0	0	54	–	54
23	(Germany) Daniel Böhm	–	–	–	54	54
24	(Austria) Dominik Landertinger	15	–	38	–	53
25	(Russia) Nikolay Kruglov	23	29	–	–	52
26	(Belarus) Alexander Syman	27	23	~~0~~	0	50
27	(United States) Jeremy Teela	0	0	0	48	48
28	(Belarus) Sergey Novikov	~~0~~	12	16	20	48
29	(France) Simon Fourcade	0	–	43	4	47
30	(Czech Republic) Roman Dostál	20	1	26	–	47
31	(Sweden) David Ekholm	6	~~0~~	40	0	46
32	(Norway) Halvard Hanevold	36	3	~~0~~	6	45
33	(United States) Tim Burke	–	0	27	18	45
34	(United States) Lowell Bailey	26	~~0~~	19	0	45
35	(Sweden) Mattias Nilsson	~~0~~	0	15	29	44
36	(Austria) Simon Eder	–	0	–	40	40
37	(Ukraine) Roman Pryma	~~0~~	40	0	0	40
38	(Italy) Markus Windisch	11	0	29	~~0~~	40
39	(Norway) Ronny Hafsas	0	–	–	36	36
40	(Czech Republic) Zdeněk Vítek	~~0~~	19	12	5	36
41	(France) Martin Fourcade	–	5	28	0	33
42	(Italy) Christian de Lorenzi	~~0~~	32	0	0	32
43	(Norway) Hans Martin Gjedrem	–	21	–	11	32
44	(Switzerland) Ivan Joller	0	0	–	31	31
45	(Czech Republic) Jaroslav Soukup	0	0	30	–	30
46	(Estonia) Roland Lessing	5	25	0	–	30
47	(Germany) Toni Lang	0	28	–	–	28
48	(Austria) Friedrich Pinter	19	0	~~0~~	9	28
49	(France) Jean-Guillaume Béatrix	0	6	–	21	27
50	(Germany) Andreas Birnbacher	10	17	–	–	27
51	(Italy) Christian Martinelli	7	–	0	19	26
52	(Czech Republic) Michal Šlesingr	~~0~~	9	3	14	26
53	(Russia) Evgeny Ustyugov	–	–	0	25	25
54	(Germany) Arnd Peiffer	–	–	–	24	24
55	(Norway) Lars Berger	16	–	7	0	23
56	(Russia) Andrei Makoveev	22	0	–	0	22
57	(Czech Republic) Tomas Holubec	0	20	–	0	20
58	(Germany) Daniel Graf	18	0	–	–	18
59	(Germany) Simon Schempp	–	–	–	17	17
59	(Kazakhstan) Sergey Naumik	–	–	17	–	17
61	(Belarus) Rustam Valiullin	3	0	14	~~0~~	17
62	(Italy) Nicola Pozzi	0	16	0	–	16
63	(Ukraine) Oleg Berezhnoy	0	15	–	–	15
64	(France) Lois Habert	0	14	–	0	14
65	(Canada) Robin Clegg	0	–	2	12	14
66	(Belarus) Sergey Sadovnikov	–	–	10	3	13
67	(Slovenia) Janez Maric	~~0~~	12	0	0	12
68	(Slovakia) Marek Matiasko	12	0	0	–	12
69	(Russia) Maxim Maksimov	~~0~~	0	4	7	11
70	(Canada) Jean Philippe Leguellec	0	2	~~0~~	8	10
71	(Czech Republic) Ondřej Moravec	9	0	–	0	9
72	(Bulgaria) Vladimir Iliev	0	0	9	–	9
73	(Kazakhstan) Dias Keneshev	0	0	8	–	8
74	(Japan) Hidenori Isa	8	0	0	–	8
75	(Slovakia) Miroslav Matiaško	–	–	6	–	6
76	(Bulgaria) Krasimir Anev	0	0	5	–	5
77	(Switzerland) Simon Hallenbarter	~~0~~	4	0	0	4
78	(Latvia) Kristaps Libietis	4	0	~~0~~	0	4
79	(Switzerland) Thomas Frei	0	~~0~~	0	2	2
80	(Slovakia) Pavol Hurajt	0	~~0~~	1	0	1
81	(Latvia) Ilmārs Bricis	1	–	0	–	1
82	(Belarus) Evgeny Abramenko	0	0	–	1	1
