= 2008–09 Biathlon World Cup – Mass start Women =

The 2008-09 Biathlon World Cup/Mass start Women will start at Sunday January 11, 2009 in Oberhof and will finish Sunday March 29, 2009 in Khanty-Mansiysk at the final event of the season. Defending titlist is Magdalena Neuner of Germany.

== Competition format ==
In the mass start, all biathletes start at the same time and the first across the finish line wins. In this 12.5 kilometres (7.8 mi) competition, the distance is skied over five laps; there are four bouts of shooting (two prone, two standing, in that order) with the first shooting bout being at the lane corresponding to your bib (Bib #10 shoots at lane #10 regardless of position in race.) with rest of the shooting bouts being at the lane in the position they arrived (Arrive at the lane in fifth place, you shoot at lane five.). As in sprint races, competitors must ski one 150 m penalty loop for each miss. Here again, to avoid unwanted congestion, World Cup Mass starts are held with only the 30 top ranking athletes on the start line (half that of the Pursuit as here all contestants start simultaneously).

== 2007-08 Top 3 Standings ==
Medal	Athlete	Points
Gold:	(Germany) Magdalena Neuner	186
Silver:	(Germany) Kati Wilhelm	138
Bronze:	(Italy) Michela Ponza	135

== Medal winners ==
Event:	Gold:	Time	Silver:	Time	Bronze:	Time
Oberhof details	Kati Wilhelm; Germany	39:55.2 (0+0+2+0)	Olga Medvedtseva; Russia	40:01.0 (0+0+1+1)	Helena Jonsson; Sweden	40:07.0 (1+1+0+0)
Antholz details	Helena Jonsson; Sweden	36:51.2 (0+0+0+1)	Kaisa Mäkäräinen; Finland	37:05.6 (0+0+0+2)	Kati Wilhelm; Germany	37:06.0 (1+2+0+0)
World Championships details	Olga Zaitseva; Russia	34:18.3 (0+0+1+1)	Anastasiya Kuzmina; Slovakia	34:25.8 (0+0+1+1)	Helena Jonsson; Sweden	34:30.6 (0+0+1+1)
Trondheim details	Tora Berger; Norway	39:29.7 (0+0+0+1)	Simone Hauswald; Germany	39:30.7 (1+0+0+1)	Sandrine Bailly; France	39:31.8 (0+0+0+1)
Khanty-Mansiysk details	Simone Hauswald; Germany	36:54.6 (0+1+0+0)	Helena Jonsson; Sweden	37:09.7 (0+0+0+0)	Andrea Henkel; Germany	37:21.5 (1+0+1+1)

== Final standings ==
#	Name	OBE	ANT	WCH	TRO	KHA	Total
1	(Sweden) Helena Jonsson	48	60	48	~~29~~	54	210
2	(Germany) Kati Wilhelm	60	48	~~11~~	40	38	186
3	(Germany) Simone Hauswald	31	~~24~~	29	54	60	174
4	(Russia) Olga Zaitseva	~~26~~	36	60	32	34	162
5	(Germany) Andrea Henkel	29	40	40	~~25~~	48	157
6	(Norway) Tora Berger	32	–	26	60	28	146
7	(Belarus) Darya Domracheva	~~0~~	22	38	43	43	146
8	(Germany) Magdalena Neuner	43	38	36	~~27~~	29	146
9	(Finland) Kaisa Mäkäräinen	38	54	24	~~20~~	24	140
10	(Russia) Olga Medvedtseva	54	–	32	18	36	'140
11	(France) Marie-Laure Brunet	34	30	34	34	~~17~~	132
12	(Sweden) Anna Carin Olofsson	–	43	21	22	31	117
13	(Slovakia) Anastasiya Kuzmina	–	–	54	36	25	115
14	(Ukraine) Valj Semerenko	19	31	25	~~12~~	40	115
15	(Russia) Anna Boulygina	–	23	18	38	32	111
16	(Germany) Martina Beck	–	29	30	21	30	110
17	(Ukraine) Vita Semerenko	20	20	43	~~17~~	23	106
18	(Romania) Éva Tófalvi	25	26	27	23	~~16~~	101
19	(Moldova) Natalia Levchenkova	36	28	16	15	~~11~~	95
20	(France) Sandrine Bailly	–	–	14	48	21	83
21	(Norway) Julie Bonnevie-Svendsen	–	32	–	24	26	82
22	(Russia) Svetlana Sleptsova	40	–	22	–	19	81
23	(Italy) Michela Ponza	15	18	–	16	27	76
24	(France) Sylvie Becaert	–	27	–	26	22	75
25	(China) Liu Xianying	17	21	23	14	–	75
26	(Slovenia) Teja Gregorin	–	–	28	28	15	71
27	(Norway) Ann Kristin Flatland	30	34	–	–	–	64
28	(Slovenia) Andreja Mali	16	14	–	13	14	57
29	(Poland) Magdalena Gwizdon	23	–	–	19	13	55
30	(France) Marie Dorin	–	–	–	31	20	51
31	(Belarus) Olga Kudrashova	27	19	–	–	–	46
32	(Germany) Kathrin Hitzer	28	17	–	–	–	45
33	(Ukraine) Oksana Khvostenko	–	25	20	–	–	45
34	(Czech Republic) Veronika Vítková	–	–	31	–	12	43
35	(China) Wang Chunli	14	16	–	11	–	41
36	(China) Dong Xue	22	13	–	–	–	35
37	(Belarus) Nadezhda Skardino	18	15	–	–	–	33
38	(Norway) Solveig Rogstad	–	–	–	30	–	30
39	(China) Kong Yingchao	24	–	–	–	–	24
40	(Ukraine) Lilia Vaygina-Efremova	21	–	–	–	–	21
41	(Bulgaria) Pavlina Filipova	–	–	19	–	–	19
42	(Russia) Oksana Neupokoeva	–	–	–	–	18	18
43	(Italy) Katja Haller	–	–	17	–	–	17
44	(Belarus) Olga Nazarova	–	–	15	–	–	15
45	(Lithuania) Diana Rasimovičiūtė	–	–	13	–	–	13
46	(Kazakhstan) Elena Khrustaleva	–	–	12	–	–	12
