= 2008–09 Biathlon World Cup – World Cup 5 =

Coordinates: 47°46′N 12°39′E

The 2008-09 Biathlon World Cup/World Cup 5 was scheduled to be held in Ruhpolding, Germany. From Wednesday January 14 until Sunday January 18, 2009.

== Schedule of events ==
The provisional schedule of the event is below.

Date	Time	Events
January 14	17:40 cet	Women's 4 x 6 km Relay
January 15	17:40 cet	Men's 4 x 7.5 km Relay
January 16	14:30 cet	Women's 7.5 km Sprint
January 17	14:15 cet	Men's 10 km Sprint
January 18	12:15 cet	Women's 10 km Pursuit
January 18	15:00 cet	Men's 12.5 km Pursuit

== Medal winners ==
=== Men ===
Event:	Gold:	Time	Silver:	Time	Bronze:	Time
4 x 7.5 km Relay details	Norway; Emil Hegle Svendsen; Alexander Os; Halvard Hanevold; Ole Einar Bjørndalen	1:24:54.0 (0+2) (0+1) (0+0) (0+2)	Germany; Michael Rösch; Christoph Stephan; Arnd Peiffer; Toni Lang	1:26:14.2 (0+3) (0+1) (0+4) (0+2)	Austria; Daniel Mesotitsch; Friedrich Pinter; Tobias Eberhard; Christoph Sumann	1:26:37.1 (0+5) (0+3) (0+3) (0+2)
10 km Sprint details	Ole Einar Bjørndalen; Norway	23:25.8 (0+0)	Dominik Landertinger; Austria	23:59.2 (0+0)	Emil Hegle Svendsen; Norway	24:01.1 (0+1)
12.5 km Pursuit details	Ole Einar Bjørndalen; Norway	36:17.4 (0+1+0+0)	Emil Hegle Svendsen; Norway	36:51.8 (1+0+0+0)	Dominik Landertinger; Austria	37:03.9 (1+1+0+0)

=== Women ===
Event:	Gold:	Time	Silver:	Time	Bronze:	Time
4 x 6 km Relay details	Germany; Andrea Henkel; Kati Wilhelm; Kathrin Hitzer; Magdalena Neuner	1:16:41.2 (0+0) (0+1) (0+2) (0+3)	Sweden; Sofia Domeij; Helena Jonsson; Anna Carin Olofsson; Anna Maria Nilsson	1:17:37.7 (0+0) (0+1) (0+3) (0+1)	China; Wang Chunli; Liu Xianying; Dong Xue; Song Chaoqing	1:19:02.3 (0+4) (0+3) (0+3) (0+4)
7.5 km Sprint details	Magdalena Neuner; Germany	23:26.6 (0+1)	Kati Wilhelm; Germany	23:26.8 (0+0)	Darya Domracheva; Belarus	23:40.6 (0+0)
10 km Pursuit details	Magdalena Neuner; Germany	32:56.5 (1+1+1+1)	Kati Wilhelm; Germany	33:18.2 (1+0+0+2)	Tora Berger; Norway	33:25.5 (1+0+0+1)
