= 2008–09 Biathlon World Cup – World Cup 3 =

The 2008-09 Biathlon World Cup/World Cup 3 was the second event of the season that was held in Hochfilzen, Austria. This leg was originally planned to be held in Pokljuka, Slovenia but was set to Hochfilzen due to unfinished reconstructions. From Thursday December 18 until Sunday December 21, 2008.

== Schedule of events ==
The schedule of the event is below.

Date	Time	Events
December 18	10:30 cet	Men's 20 km Individual
December 18	14:15 cet	Women's 15 km Individual
December 20	10:30 cet	Men's 10 km Sprint
December 20	14:15 cet	Women's 7.5 km Sprint
December 21	10:45 cet	Men's 4 x 7.5 km Relay
December 21	14:15 cet	Women's 4 x 6 km Relay

== Medal winners ==
=== Men ===
Event:	Gold:	Time	Silver:	Time	Bronze:	Time
20 km Individual details	Maxim Tchoudov; Russia	56:00.3 (0+1+0+0)	Ivan Tcherezov; Russia	56:47.9 (0+0+2+0)	Björn Ferry; Sweden	56:48.8 (0+0+1+0)
10 km Sprint details	Lars Berger; Norway	25:23.1 (0+0)	Alexander Os; Norway	26:01.0 (0+1)	Carl Johan Bergman; Sweden	26:14.7 (0+1)
4 x 7.5 km Relay details	Austria; Daniel Mesotitsch; Friedrich Pinter; Tobias Eberhard; Christoph Sumann	1:21:23.18 (0+2) (0+3) (0+0) (0+0)	Sweden; Magnús Jónsson; Mattias Nilsson; Björn Ferry; Carl Johan Bergman	1:22:34.33 (0+2) (1+5) (0+2) (0+3)	France; Vincent Jay; Vincent Defrasne; Jean-Guillaume Béatrix; Simon Fourcade	1:22:39.44 (0+2) (0+0) (0+2) (0+1)

=== Women ===
Event:	Gold:	Time	Silver:	Time	Bronze:	Time
15 km Individual details	Éva Tófalvi; Romania	50:20.5 (0+0+0+0)	Svetlana Sleptsova; Russia	50:52.9 (0+1+0+1)	Simone Hauswald; Germany	52:13.3 (0+2+0+1)
7.5 km Sprint details	Svetlana Sleptsova; Russia	23:21.8 (1+0)	Vita Semerenko; Ukraine	23:38.4 (0+0)	Helena Jonsson; Sweden	23:46.1 (0+0)
4 x 6 km Relay details	Germany; Andrea Henkel; Simone Hauswald; Magdalena Neuner; Kathrin Hitzer	1:15:43.7 (0+0) (1+4) (2+3) (0+1)	France; Marie-Laure Brunet; Sylvie Becaert; Julie Carraz-Collin; Sandrine Bailly	1:16:14.1 (0+1) (0+0) (0+2) (2+4)	Poland; Krystyna Pałka; Magdalena Gwizdoń; Weronika Novakowska; Agnieszka Grzybek	1:16:29.6 (0+0) (0+0) (0+2) (0+3)
