= 2008–09 Biathlon World Cup – World Cup 4 =

Coordinates: 50°42′N 10°44′E

The 2008-09 Biathlon World Cup/World Cup 4 has been held in Oberhof, Germany. From Wednesday January 7 until Sunday January 11, 2009.

== Schedule of events ==
The provisional schedule of the event is below.

Date	Time	Events
January 7	17:20 cet	Women's 4 x 6 km Relay
January 8	17:20 cet	Men's 4 x 7.5 km Relay
January 9	17:30 cet	Women's 7.5 km Sprint
January 10	17:20 cet	Men's 10 km Sprint
January 11	13:00 cet	Women's 12.5 km Mass Start
January 11	16:00 cet	Men's 15 km Mass Start

== Medal winners ==
=== Men ===
Event:	Gold:	Time	Silver:	Time	Bronze:	Time
4 x 7.5 km Relay details	Austria; Daniel Mesotitsch; Friedrich Pinter; Dominik Landertinger; Christoph Sumann	1:19:36.6 (0+3) (0+3) (0+4) (0+2)	Germany; Michael Greis; Michael Rösch; Arnd Peiffer; Toni Lang	1:19:55.8 (1+3) (0+2) (0+0) (0+4)	Norway; Emil Hegle Svendsen; Rune Brattsveen; Halvard Hanevold; Ole Einar Bjørndalen	1:20:52.6 (0+1) (1+6) (0+2) (1+3)
10 km Sprint details	Maxim Tchoudov; Russia	25:49.5 (0+0)	Michael Roesch; Germany	26:02.2 (0+0)	Tomasz Sikora; Poland	26:14.7 (1+0)
15 km Mass Start details	Christoph Sumann; Austria	38:11.9 (1+0+1+0)	Carl Johan Bergman; Sweden	38:21.6 (0+0+1+1)	Ole Einar Bjørndalen; Norway	38:21.8 (0+1+1+0)

=== Women ===
Event:	Gold:	Time	Silver:	Time	Bronze:	Time
4 x 6 km Relay details	Ukraine; Olena Pidhrushna; Valj Semerenko; Vita Semerenko; Oksana Khvostenko	1:17:57.9 (0+0) (0+0) (0+3) (0+1)	Germany; Simone Hauswald; Kati Wilhelm; Sabrina Buchholz; Kathrin Hitzer	1:18:19.1 (1+5) (0+1) (1+3) (0+3)	France; Marie-Laure Brunet; Sylvie Becaert; Pauline Macabies; Marie Dorin	1:19:02.3 (0+3) (0+4) (0+3) (0+0)
7.5 km Sprint details	Andrea Henkel; Germany	22:12.1 (0+0)	Helena Jonsson; Sweden	22:29.3 (0+0)	Tora Berger; Norway	22:30.0 (0+0)
12.5 km Mass Start details	Kati Wilhelm; Germany	39:55.2 (0+0+2+0)	Olga Medvedtseva; Russia	40:01.0 (0+0+1+1)	Helena Jonsson; Sweden	40:07.0 (1+1+0+0)
