= 2008–09 Biathlon World Cup – Nation Men =

== Standings ==
standings as of February 16, 2009

#	Nation	ÖST IN	ÖST SP	HOC SP	HOC RL	HOC IN	HOC SP	HOC RL	OBE REL	OBE SP	RUH RL	RUH SP	ANT SP	WCH SP	WCH IN	WCH REL	VAN IN	VAN SP	TRO SP	KHA SP	Total
1	Norway	438	441	437	360	372	441	310	390	383	450	437	462	380							5719
2	Austria	393	320	356	420	372	395	450	450	387	390	418	370	383							5503
3	Germany	399	375	395	250	401	384	360	420	432	420	379	382	399							5377
4	Sweden	362	347	399	310	375	371	420	270	356	270	368	336	324							4932
5	France	289	337	340	220	327	408	390	360	316	310	360	361	391							4738
6	Ukraine	412	329	319	390	389	358	330	200	289	180	235	339	354							4471
7	Czech Republic	325	354	306	200	348	283	270	250	376	290	345	306	368							4343
8	Russia	381	373	415	450	443	369	–	–	404	–	374	360	371							4327
9	Italy	297	361	320	230	334	303	250	210	302	360	347	354	316							4274
10	Belarus	303	357	290	270	324	306	290	330	298	140	263	305	340							4114
11	United States	246	284	241	180	191	228	200	230	348	330	254	300	343							3623
12	Switzerland	226	276	321	210	239	309	220	310	57	190	215	319	248							3446
13	Slovenia	202	215	165	330	272	228	190	220	257	230	262	317	271							3410
14	Slovakia	290	215	183	190	177	211	230	290	276	250	266	286	306							3260
15	Poland	219	291	253	170	257	275	–	–	263	200	241	249	265							2975
16	Canada	226	320	317	290	227	216	210	–	–	–	276	253	253							2877
17	Estonia	232	224	238	160	223	209	–	160	176	210	297	242	228							2850
