= 2008–09 Biathlon World Cup – World Cup 2 =

The 2008-09 Biathlon World Cup/World Cup 2 is the second event of the season and will be held in Hochfilzen, Austria. From Friday December 12 until Sunday December 14, 2008.

== Schedule of events ==
The schedule of the event is below.

Date	Time	Events
December 12	11:30 cet	Men's 10 km Sprint
December 12	14:15 cet	Women's 7.5 km Sprint
December 13	11:45 cet	Men's 12.5 km Pursuit
December 13	14:15 cet	Women's 10 km Pursuit
December 14	11:00 cet	Men's 4 x 7.5 km Relay
December 14	14:15 cet	Women's 4 x 6 km Relay

== Medal winners ==
=== Men ===
Event:	Gold:	Time	Silver:	Time	Bronze:	Time
10 km Sprint details	Emil Hegle Svendsen; Norway	26:08.1 (0+0)	Ivan Tcherezov; Russia	26:34.4 (0+1)	Alexander Os; Norway	26:41.0 (1+0)
12.5 km Pursuit details	Emil Hegle Svendsen; Norway	35:46.3 (1+0+1+1)	Ole Einar Bjørndalen; Norway	35:55.7 (0+0+2+0)	Tomasz Sikora; Poland	35:58.4(1+0+0+2)
4 x 7.5 km Relay details	Russia; Ivan Tcherezov; Maxim Tchoudov; Maxim Maksimov; Nikolay Kruglov	1:24:22.97 (0+0) (1+5) (0+3) (0+1)	Austria; Daniel Mesotitsch; Friedrich Pinter; Dominik Landertinger; Christoph Sumann	1:26:11.08 (0+3) (0+1) (2+4) (0+1)	Ukraine; Vyacheslav Derkach; Andriy Deryzemlya; Oleg Berezhnoy; Serguei Sednev	1:27:01.50 (2+4) (1+4) (0+1) (0+3)

=== Women ===
Event:	Gold:	Time	Silver:	Time	Bronze:	Time
7.5 km Sprint details	Simone Hauswald; Germany	23:04.3 (0+0)	Svetlana Sleptsova; Russia	23:18.4 (0+2)	Andrea Henkel; Germany	23:22.6 (0+1)
10 km Pursuit details	Martina Beck; Germany	33:41.28 (0+0+1+0)	Svetlana Sleptsova; Russia	33:59.56 (1+0+1+2)	Simone Hauswald; Germany	34:00.40 (0+1+2+2)
4 x 6 km Relay details	Norway; Solveig Rogstad; Julie Bonnevie-Svendsen; Ann Kristin Flatland; Tora Berger	1:12:44.3 (0+1) (0+0) (1+6) (0+1)	France; Marie-Laure Brunet; Sylvie Becaert; Julie Carraz-Collin; Sandrine Bailly	1:12:46.4 (0+2) (0+3) (0+1) (0+3)	Germany; Andrea Henkel; Martina Beck; Simone Hauswald; Kati Wilhelm	1:13:28.5 (0+4) (0+2) (0+4) (2+3)
