= 2008–09 Biathlon World Cup – World Cup 8 =

Coordinates: 63°23′N 10°21′E

The 2008-09 Biathlon World Cup - World Cup 8 was the eighth event of the World Cup season and was held in Trondheim, Norway, from Thursday March 19 until Sunday March 22, 2009.

== Schedule of events ==
The schedule of the event is below

Date	Time	Events
March 19	11:30 cet	Men's 10 km Sprint
March 19	14:15 cet	Women's 7.5 km Sprint
March 21	12:30 cet	Men's 12.5 km Pursuit
March 21	14:15 cet	Women's 10 km Pursuit
March 22	13:15 cet	Men's 15 km Mass Start
March 22	15:15 cet	Women's 12.5 km Mass Start

== Event summary ==
=== Men ===
Event:	Winner:	Time	Second:	Time	Third:	Time
10 km Sprint details	Michael Greis; Germany	26:11.3 (0+0)	Ole Einar Bjørndalen; Norway	26:29.6 (1+0)	Simon Eder; Austria	26:43.1 (0+0)
12.5 km Pursuit details	Ole Einar Bjørndalen; Norway	33:36.3 (1+0+1+0)	Simon Eder; Austria	34:01.4 (0+0+1+0)	Tomasz Sikora; Poland	34:01.6 (0+1+1+0)
15 km Mass Start details	Ole Einar Bjørndalen; Norway	41:12.9 (0+0+0+0)	Simon Eder; Austria	41:52.0 (0+0+1+0)	Emil Hegle Svendsen; Norway	42:06.3 (1+0+0+1)

=== Women ===
Event:	Winner:	Time	Second:	Time	Third:	Time
7.5 km Sprint details	Olga Zaitseva; Russia	22:56.9 (0+0)	Helena Jonsson; Sweden	23:02.4 (0+0)	Sylvie Becaert; France	23:08.0 (0+1)
10 km Pursuit details	Andrea Henkel; Germany	30:08.8 (0+0+0+0)	Olga Zaitseva; Russia	30:21.7 (0+0+0+1)	Marie-Laure Brunet; France	30:37.1 (0+0+0+1)
12.5 km Mass Start details	Tora Berger; Norway	39:29.7 (0+0+0+1)	Simone Hauswald; Germany	39:30.7 (1+0+0+1)	Sandrine Bailly; France	39:31.8 (0+0+0+1)
