= 2008–09 Biathlon World Cup – World Cup 6 =

Coordinates: 46°47′N 12°03′E

The 2008–09 Biathlon World Cup/World Cup 6 was held in Rasen-Antholz, Italy, from Thursday January 22 until Sunday January 25, 2009. After this leg the biathletes traveled to Pyeongchang, South Korea for the Biathlon World Championships 2009.

== Schedule of events ==
The schedule of the event is below.

Date	Time	Events
January 22	14:15 cet	Women's 7.5 km Sprint
January 23	14:15 cet	Men's 10 km Sprint
January 24	12:45 cet	Women's 10 km Pursuit
January 24	14:45 cet	Men's 12.5 km Pursuit
January 25	12:15 cet	Women's 12.5 km Mass Start
January 25	14:15 cet	Men's 15 km Mass Start

== Results ==
=== Men ===
Event:	Gold:	Time	Silver:	Time	Bronze:	Time
10 km Sprint details	Emil Hegle Svendsen; Norway	24:52.5 (0+0)	Björn Ferry; Sweden	24:56.1 (0+0)	Tomasz Sikora; Poland	24:59.2 (0+0)
12.5 km Pursuit details	Björn Ferry; Sweden	33:19.4 (0+0+1+0)	Simon Eder; Austria	33:37.0 (0+0+0+0)	Emil Hegle Svendsen; Norway	33:44.1 (1+0+1+1)
15 km Mass Start details	Christoph Stephan; Germany	37:19.9 (0+0+0+1)	Dominik Landertinger; Austria	37:20.1 (1+2+0+0)	Ivan Tcherezov; Russia	37:22.7 (0+0+1+1)

=== Women ===
Event:	Gold:	Time	Silver:	Time	Bronze:	Time
7.5 km Sprint details	Tora Berger; Norway	21:25.5 (0+1)	Darya Domracheva; Belarus	21.33.6 (1+0)	Kati Wilhelm; Germany	21:46.2 (1+0)
10 km Pursuit details	Anna Boulygina; Russia	32:49.8 (0+1+0+1)	Kaisa Mäkäräinen; Finland	32:52.1 (0+0+0+1)	Darya Domracheva; Belarus	32:52.1 (1+0+1+0)
12.5 km Mass Start details	Helena Jonsson; Sweden	36:51.2 (0+0+0+1)	Kaisa Mäkäräinen; Finland	37:05.6 (0+0+0+2)	Kati Wilhelm; Germany	37:06.0 (1+2+0+0)
