= 2008–09 Biathlon World Cup – World Cup 7 =

Coordinates: 49°16′N 123°07′W

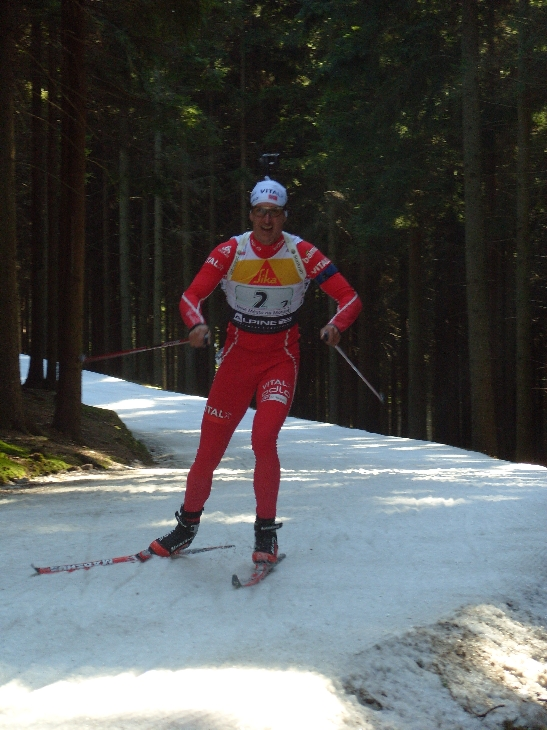
2008–09 Biathlon World Cup – World Cup 7

The 2008-09 Biathlon World Cup/World Cup 7 was held in Vancouver, British Columbia, Canada from March 11–15, 2009.

== Schedule of events ==
The provisional schedule of the event is below.

Date	Time	Events
March 11	18:15 cet	Women's 15 km Individual
March 11	23:30 cet	Men's 20 km Individual
March 13	18:15 cet	Women's 7.5 km Sprint
March 13	22:00 cet	Men's 10 km Sprint
March 14	20:30 cet	Women's 4 x 6 km Relay
March 15	18:00 cet	Men's 4 x 7.5 km Relay

== Medal winners ==
=== Men ===
Event:	Gold:	Time	Silver:	Time	Bronze:	Time
20 km Individual details	Vincent Jay; France	49:53.9 (0+0+0+0)	Daniel Böhm; Germany	50:12.9 (0+1+0+0)	Jeremy Teela; United States	50:17.2 (0+1+0+0)
10 km Sprint details	Lars Berger; Norway	24:06.5 (0+0)	Ole Einar Bjørndalen; Norway	24:20.6 (0+0)	Christoph Sumann; Austria	24:46.0 (0+0)
4 x 7.5 km Relay details	Sweden; David Ekholm; Mattias Nilsson; Fredrik Lindström; Carl Johan Bergman	1:16:18.6 (0+1) (0+3) (0+2) (0+0)	France; Vincent Jay; Vincent Defrasne; Martin Fourcade; Simon Fourcade	1:16:24.9 (0+2) (0+1) (0+0) (0+0)	Germany; Simon Schempp; Daniel Böhm; Arnd Peiffer; Michael Rösch	1:16:35.0 (0+3) (0+3) (0+2) (0+2)

=== Women ===
Event:	Gold:	Time	Silver:	Time	Bronze:	Time
15 km Individual details	Simone Hauswald; Germany	42:44.6 (0+0+0+0)	Olga Zaitseva; Russia	43:23.9 (0+0+0+1)	Vita Semerenko; Ukraine	43:50.4 (0+0+1+0)
7.5 km Sprint details	Helena Jonsson; Sweden	19:43.6 (0+0)	Magdalena Neuner; Germany	19:44.3 (0+1)	Olga Zaitseva; Russia	19:45.2 (0+0)
4 x 6 km Relay details	Germany; Kati Wilhelm; Magdalena Neuner; Martina Beck; Andrea Henkel	1:11:49.8 (0+1) (0+0) (0+5) (0+0)	China; Wang Chunli; Liu Xianying; Dong Xue; Liu Yuan-Yuan	1:13:05.0 (0+2) (0+2) (0+0) (0+1)	Russia; Svetlana Sleptsova; Anna Boulygina; Olga Medvedtseva; Olga Zaitseva	1:13:40.3 (0+5) (1+4) (0+1) (0+2)
