= 2008–09 Biathlon World Cup – World Cup 1 =

Coordinates: 63°11′N 14°38′E

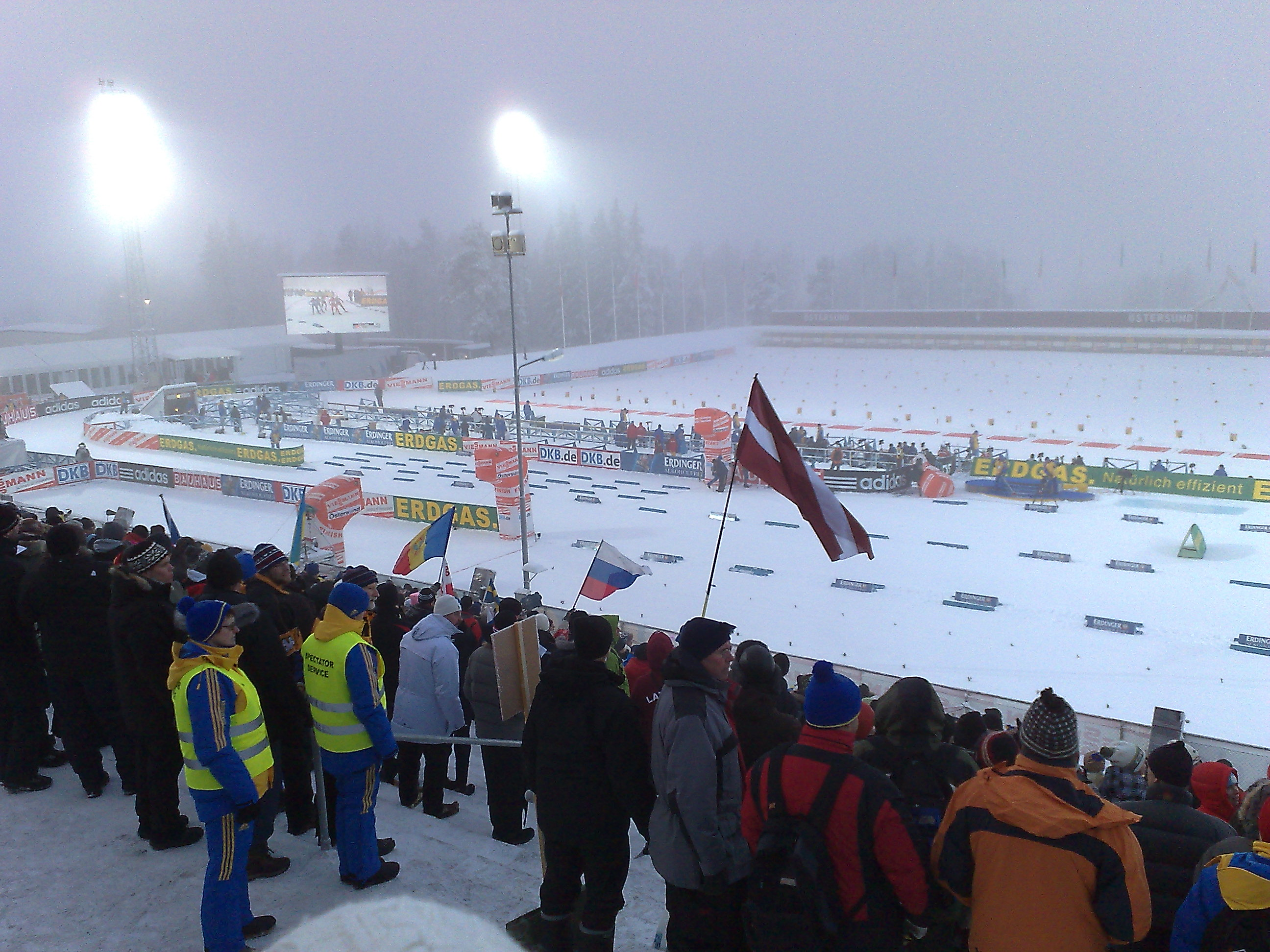
World cup in Östersund

The 2008-09 Biathlon World Cup - World Cup 1 was the opening event of the season and has been held in Östersund, Sweden. From Wednesday December 3 until Sunday December 7, 2008.

== Schedule of events ==
The schedule of the event is below

Date	Time	Events
December 3	17:15 cet	Men's 20 km Individual
December 4	17:15 cet	Women's 15 km Individual
December 6	12:00 cet	Men's 10 km Sprint
December 6	14:30 cet	Women's 7.5 km Sprint
December 7	11:00 cet	Men's 12.5 km Pursuit
December 7	13:00 cet	Women's 10 km Pursuit

== Medal winners ==
=== Men ===
Event:	Gold:	Time	Silver:	Time	Bronze:	Time
20 km Individual details	Michael Greis; Germany	58:52.5 (0+1+0+0)	Alexander Os; Norway	59:43.0 (0+0+0+2)	Emil Hegle Svendsen; Norway	59:47.5 (0+2+0+0)
10 km Sprint details	Emil Hegle Svendsen; Norway	25:42.3 (0+1)	Tomasz Sikora; Poland	25:55.0 (0+1)	Simon Fourcade; France	26:10.4 (0+0)
12.5 km Pursuit details	Tomasz Sikora; Poland	34:55.5 (0+2+0+1)	Ole Einar Bjørndalen; Norway	34:58.0 (1+2+0+0)	Emil Hegle Svendsen; Norway	35:00.4 (0+1+2+0)

=== Women ===
Event:	Gold:	Time	Silver:	Time	Bronze:	Time
15 km Individual details	Helena Jonsson; Sweden	45:05.1 (0+0+0+0)	Kati Wilhelm; Germany	45:44.8 (1+0+0+0)	Magdalena Neuner; Germany	46:20.5 (0+0+0+1)
7.5 km Sprint details	Wang Chunli; China	22:48.1 (0+0)	Tora Berger; Norway	22:49.5 (0+0)	Magdalena Neuner; Germany	22:52.9 (0+0)
10 km Pursuit details	Martina Beck; Germany	32:42.4 (0+0+0+0)	Svetlana Sleptsova; Russia	33:11.6 (0+1+1+1)	Kati Wilhelm; Germany	33:14.4 (0+1+2+0)
