= Magnus Jonsson (biathlete) =

Swedish biathlete (born 1982)

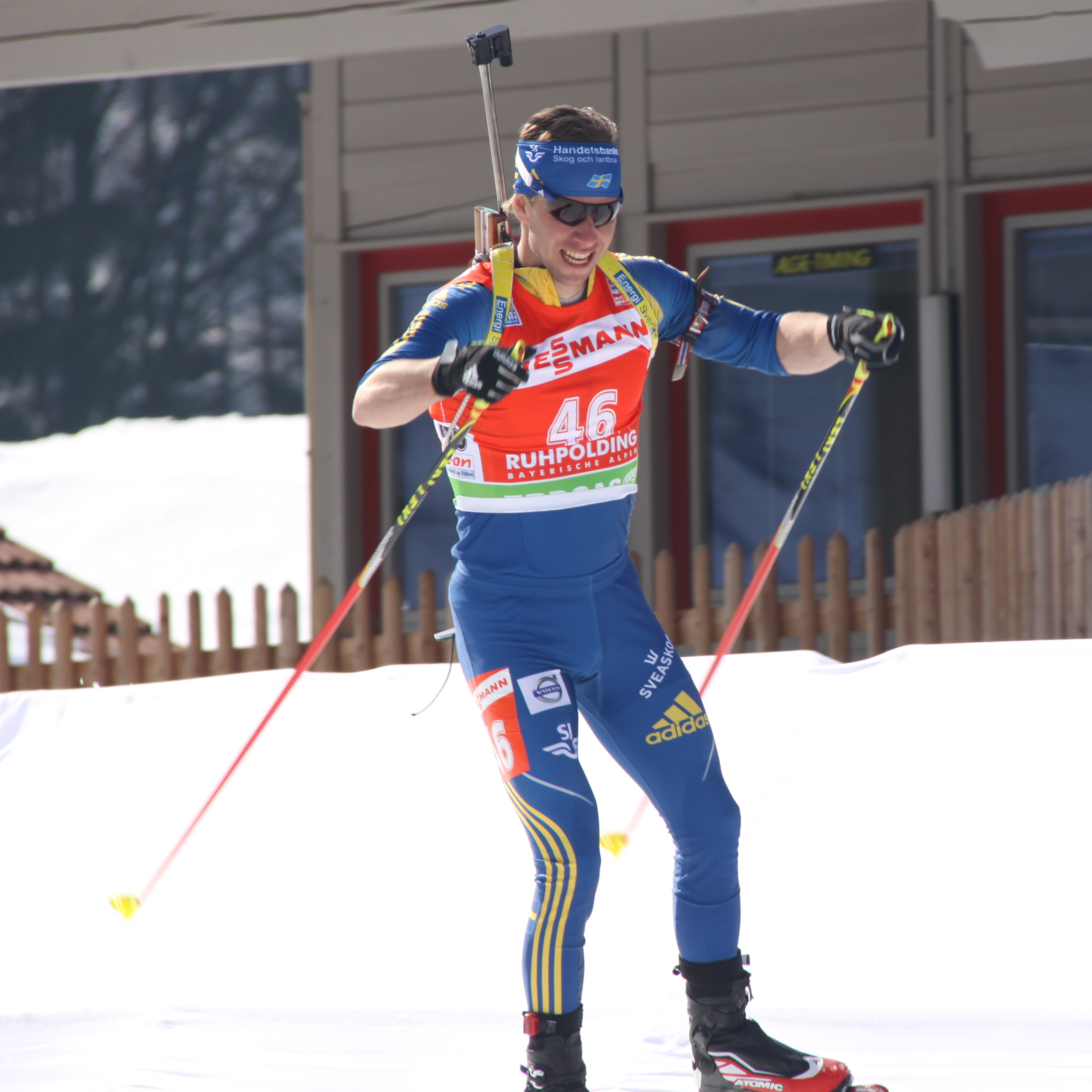
- Image of Magnus Jonsson

Personal information
- Born: 4 April 1982 (age 44) Sollefteå, Sweden

Sport
- Sport: Skiing
- Updated on 28 February 2013

Magnus Jonsson (born in Sollefteå on 4 April 1982) is a Swedish biathlete.

Jonsson competed in the 2010 Winter Olympics for Sweden. He finished 79th in the sprint.

As of February 2013, his best performance at the Biathlon World Championships, is 3rd, as part of the 2011 Swedish men's relay team. His best individual performance is 15th, in the 2009 pursuit.

As of February 2013, he has won two Biathlon World Cup medal, a silver with the Swedish men's relay team at Hochfilzen in 2008/09 season and one bronze in men's relay Chanty-Mansijsk 2011. His best individual finish is 10th, in the pursuit at Kontiolahti in 2009/10. His best overall finish in the Biathlon World Cup is 56th, in both 2008/09 and 2011/12.

== World Cup podiums ==
Season	Location	Event	Rank
2008/09	Hochfilzen	Relay	2nd place, silver medalist(s)
