= 2008–09 Biathlon World Cup – World Cup 9 =

Coordinates: 61°00′N 69°01′E

The 2008-09 Biathlon World Cup - World Cup 9 was the nine event of the World Cup season and was held in Khanty-Mansiysk, Russia, from Thursday March 26 until Sunday March 29, 2009.

== Schedule of events ==
The schedule of the event is below

Date	Time	Events
March 26	18:15 cet	Men's 10 km Sprint
March 27	18:15 cet	Women's 7.5 km Sprint
March 28	14:15 cet	Men's 12.5 km Pursuit
March 28	18:15 cet	Women's 10 km Pursuit
March 29	13:00 cet	Men's 15 km Mass Start
March 29	15:00 cet	Women's 12.5 km Mass Start

== Event summary ==
=== Men ===
Event:	Winner:	Time	Second:	Time	Third:	Time
10 km Sprint details	Arnd Peiffer; Germany	25:51.1 (0+0)	Ole Einar Bjørndalen; Norway	26:14.2 (0+1)	Christoph Sumann; Austria	26:18.4 (0+0)
12.5 km Pursuit details	Emil Hegle Svendsen; Norway	33:03.3 (0+0+1+1)	Ole Einar Bjørndalen; Norway	33:03.4 (1+0+0+1)	Christoph Sumann; Austria	33:27.1 (0+0+2+0)
15 km Mass Start details	Simon Eder; Austria	37:14.4 (0+0+0+0)	Dominik Landertinger; Austria	37:26.5 (0+0+0+1)	Ole Einar Bjørndalen; Norway	37:31.4 (2+0+0+1)

=== Women ===
Event:	Winner:	Time	Second:	Time	Third:	Time
7.5 km Sprint details	Tina Bachmann; Germany	20:49.8 (0+0)	Simone Hauswald; Germany	20:53.5 (0+0)	Anna Carin Olofsson; Sweden	21:09.1 (0+0)
10 km Pursuit details	Magdalena Neuner; Germany	27:53.0 (1+0+0+1)	Michela Ponza; Italy	28:21.8 (0+0+0+0)	Marie Dorin; France	28:23.5 (0+0+1+0)
12.5 km Mass Start details	Simone Hauswald; Germany	36:54.6 (0+1+0+0)	Helena Jonsson; Sweden	37:09.7 (0+0+0+0)	Andrea Henkel; Germany	37:21.5 (1+0+1+1)
