= Toni Lang =

German biathlete

Medal record

Representing Germany

Men's biathlon

Toni Lang (born 22 April 1982 in Hutthurm) is a German former biathlete. In 2008, he ran his first single World Cup Race. After Biathlon World Cup 2010/2011 he retired from active biathlon sports and started studying dentistry. He is the husband of biathlete Kathrin Hitzer.

== Career highlights ==
World Cup
2009, Oberhof, Germany, (silver) 2nd at team relay (with Rösch / Greis / Peiffer)
2009, Ruhpolding, (silver) 2nd at team relay (with Rösch / Stephan / Peiffer)
