= Sofia Domeij =

Swedish former biathlete

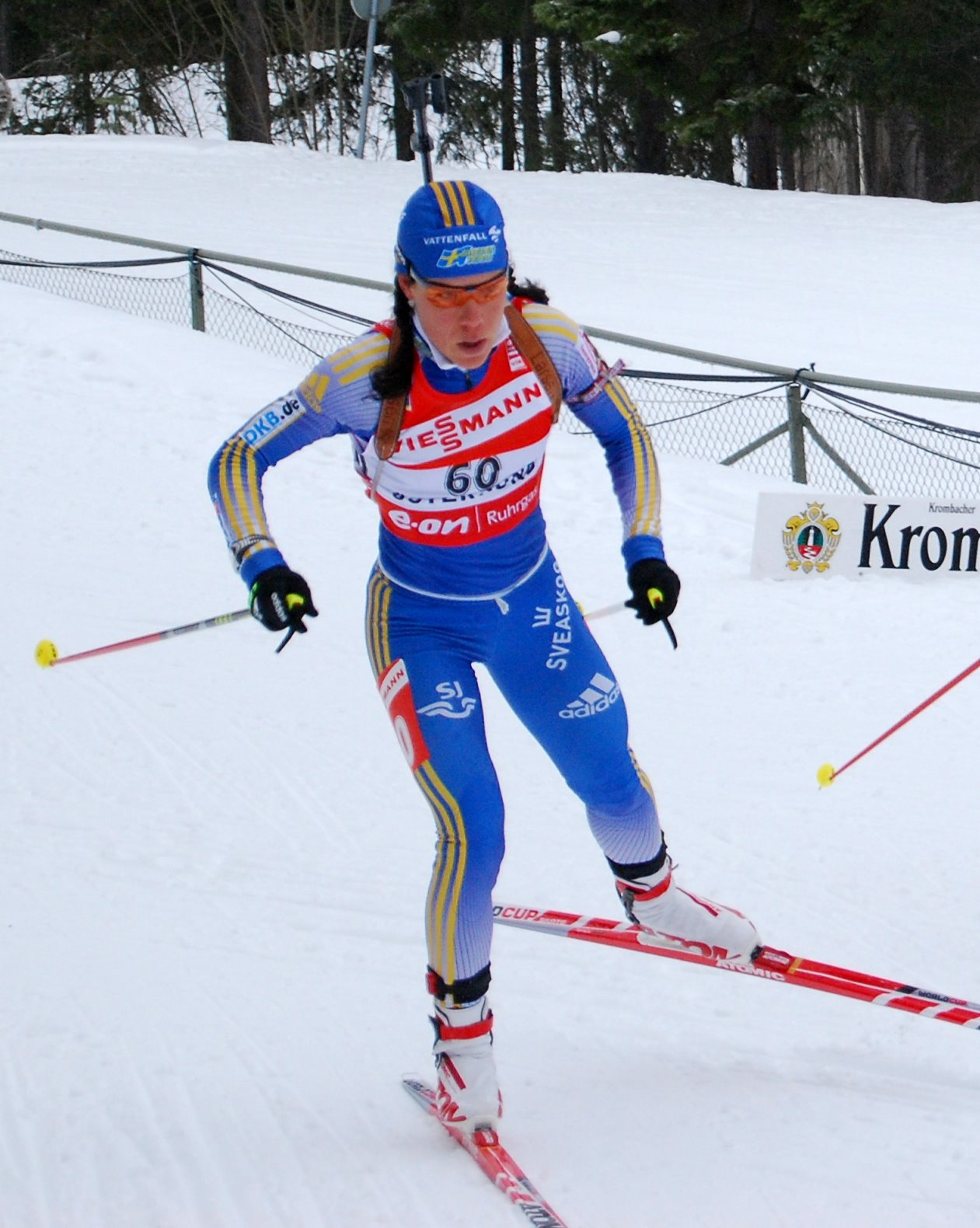
- Sofia Domeij at the Biathlon World Championships in Östersund, Sweden in February 2008.

Personal information
- Nationality: Sweden
- Born: 22 October 1976 (age 49) Hudiksvall, Sweden

Sport
- Sport: Skiing

Sofia Domeij (born 22 October 1976, in Hudiksvall) is a Swedish former biathlete. She has a Master of Science degree in technical chemistry. On September 2, 2011, Domeij officially retired due to injuries.
