= Christoph Stephan =

German biathlete (born 1986)

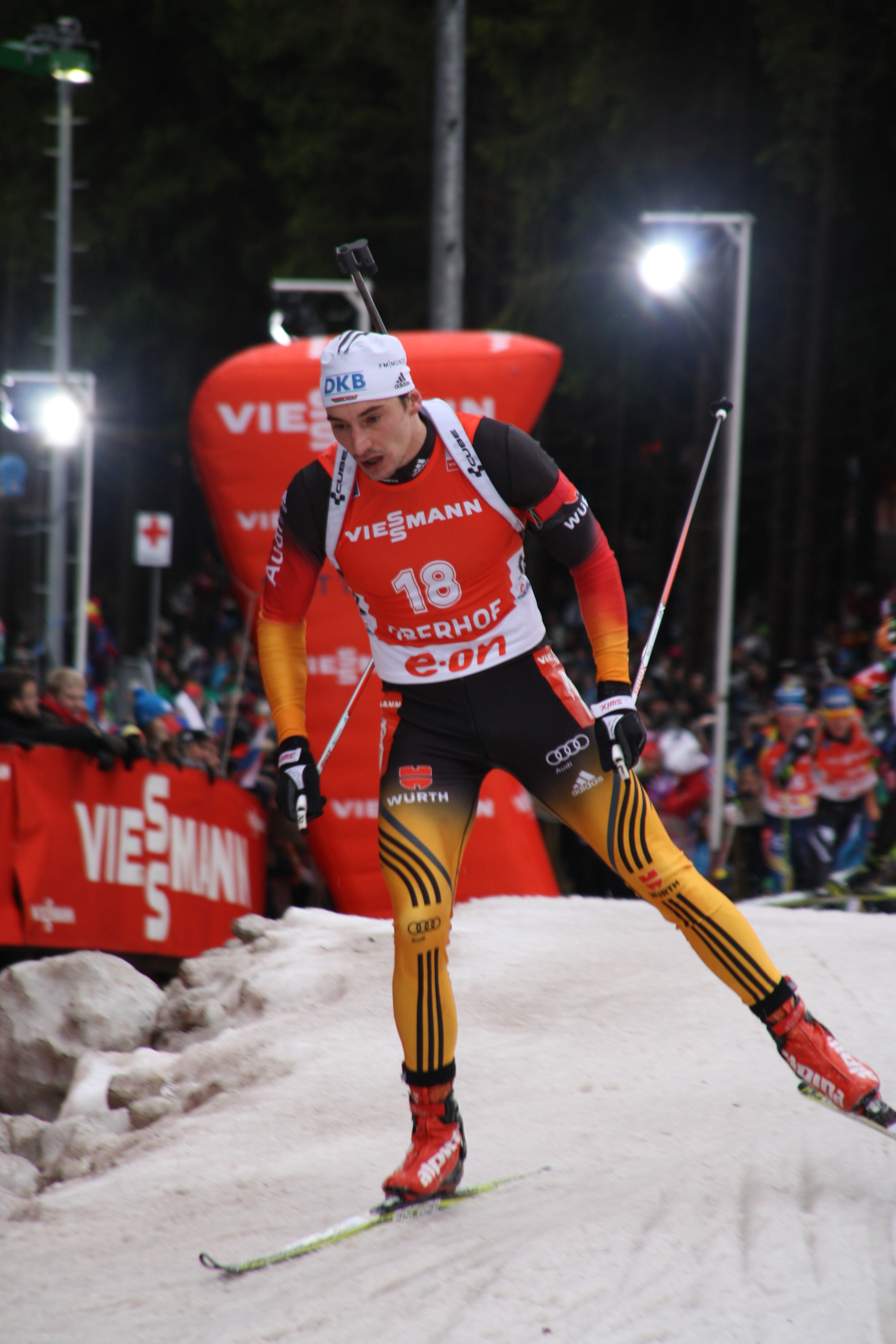

Personal information
- Born: 12 January 1986 (age 40) Rudolstadt, Bezirk Gera, East Germany

Sport
- Sport: Skiing

World Cup career
- Seasons: 2006–2015
- Indiv. podiums: 3
- Indiv. wins: 1
Medal record
Men's biathlon
Representing Germany
World Championships
Silver medal – second place	2009 Pyeongchang	20 km individual
Bronze medal – third place	2009 Pyeongchang	4x7.5 km relay
Junior World Championships
Gold medal – first place	2007 Martell	10 km sprint
Gold medal – first place	2007 Martell	12.5 km pursuit
Gold medal – first place	2007 Martell	4 × 7.5 km relay
Bronze medal – third place	2006 Presque Isle	4 × 7.5 km relay
- Updated on 23 January 2010

Christoph Stephan (born 12 January 1986 in Rudolstadt, Bezirk Gera) is a former German biathlete. In 2009 in Antholz, he won his first single World Cup Race.

== Career highlights ==
IBU World Championships
2009, Pyeongchang, (silver) 2nd at 20 km individual
2009, Pyeongchang, (bronze) 3rd at team relay (with Rösch / Peiffer / Greis)

World Cup
2009, Ruhpolding, (silver) 2nd at team relay (with Rösch / Peiffer / Lang)
2009, Rasen-Antholz, (gold) 1st at mass start
