= Tobias Eberhard =

Austrian biathlete (born 1985)

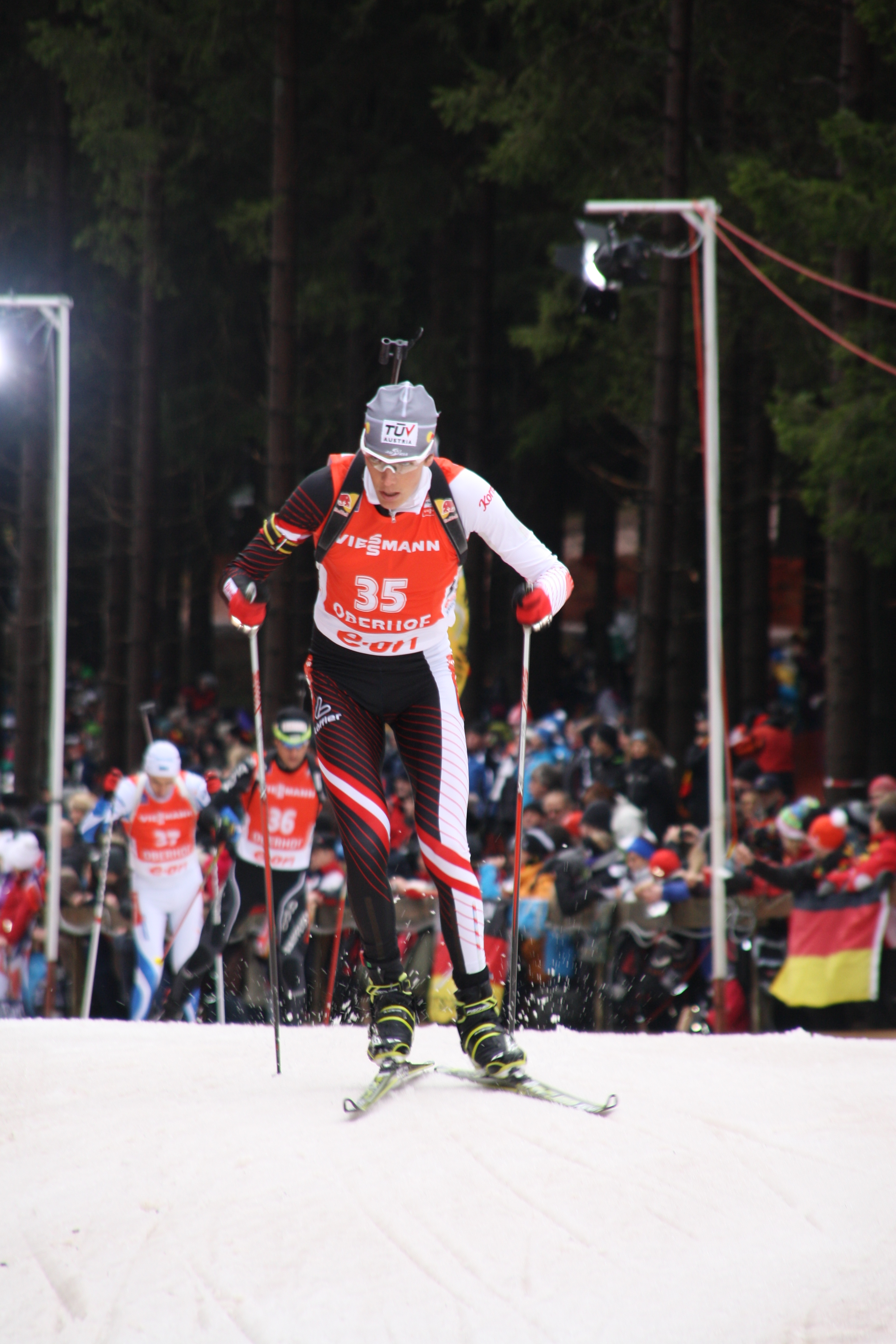
- Eberhard in Oberhof in 2014

Personal information
- Nationality: Austrian
- Born: 12 January 1985 (age 41) Saalfelden am Steinernen Meer, Austria

Sport
- Sport: Biathlon
Medal record
European Championships
Gold medal – first place	2011 Ridnaun	10 km sprint
Bronze medal – third place	2007 Bansko	10 km sprint

Tobias Eberhard (born 12 January 1985) is an Austrian biathlete. He competed in the 2018 Winter Olympics.

He is the older brother of biathlete Julian Eberhard.

== Biathlon results ==
All results are sourced from the International Biathlon Union.

=== Olympic Games ===
0 medals

Event	Individual	Sprint	Pursuit	Mass start	Relay	Mixed relay
(South Korea) 2018 Pyeongchang	57th	77th	—	—	4th	—

=== World Championships ===
0 medals

Event	Individual	Sprint	Pursuit	Mass start	Relay	Mixed relay	Single mixed relay
(Sweden) 2019 Östersund	—	—	—	—	—	17th	—
