= Mattias Nilsson =

Swedish biathlete (born 1982)

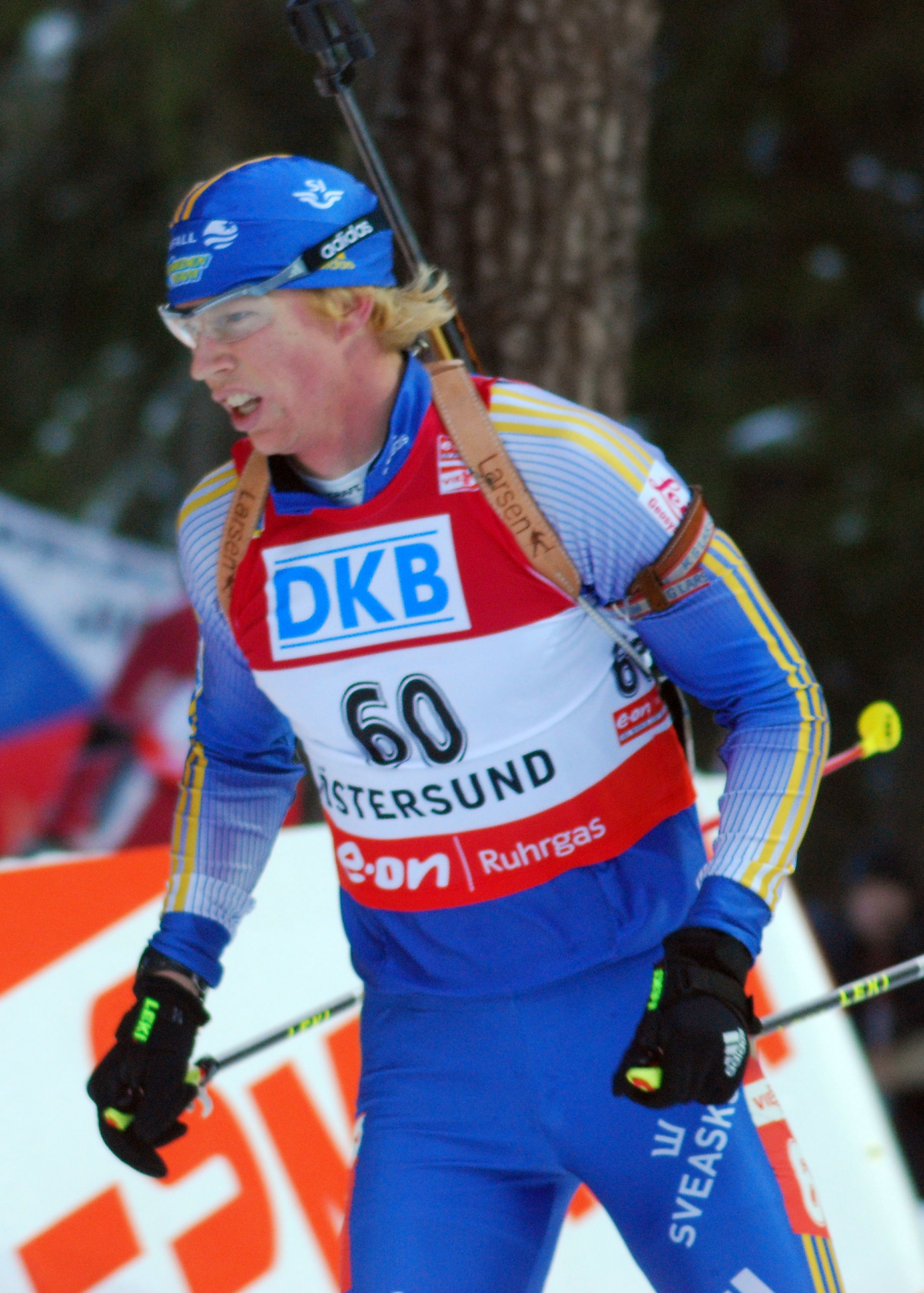
- Nilsson in Östersund in 2008.

Personal information
- Full name: Mattias Nilsson
- Born: 19 February 1982 (age 44) Brunflo, Sweden
- Height: 1.90 m (6 ft 3 in)

Sport

Professional information
- Sport: Biathlon
- Club: JämtBiathlon
- World Cup debut: 5 December 2002
- Retired: 27 September 2011

Olympic Games
- Teams: 2 (2006, 2010)
- Medals: 0

World Championships
- Teams: 7 (2003, 2004, 2005, 2006, 2007, 2008, 2009)
- Medals: 0

World Cup
- Seasons: 9 (2002/03–2010/11)
- Individual victories: 0
- All victories: 2
- Individual podiums: 2
- All podiums: 6
Medal record
Men's biathlon
Representing Sweden
Olympic Games
Bronze medal – third place	2010 Vancouver	4 × 7.5 km relay
Junior World Championships
Gold medal – first place	2002 Ridnaun	10 km sprint

Mattias Nilsson (born 19 February 1982 in Brunflo, near Östersund) is a former Swedish biathlete.

Nilsson retired after the 2010–11 season, announcing on 27 September 2011 his retirement from the sport due to a heart condition.

In May 2018, it was announced that he, from the 2018–2019 season, becomes coach for Team Sweden in men's cross-country skiing together with Johan Olsson and Fredrik Uusitalo.
