= Kathrin Lang =

German biathlete (born 1986)

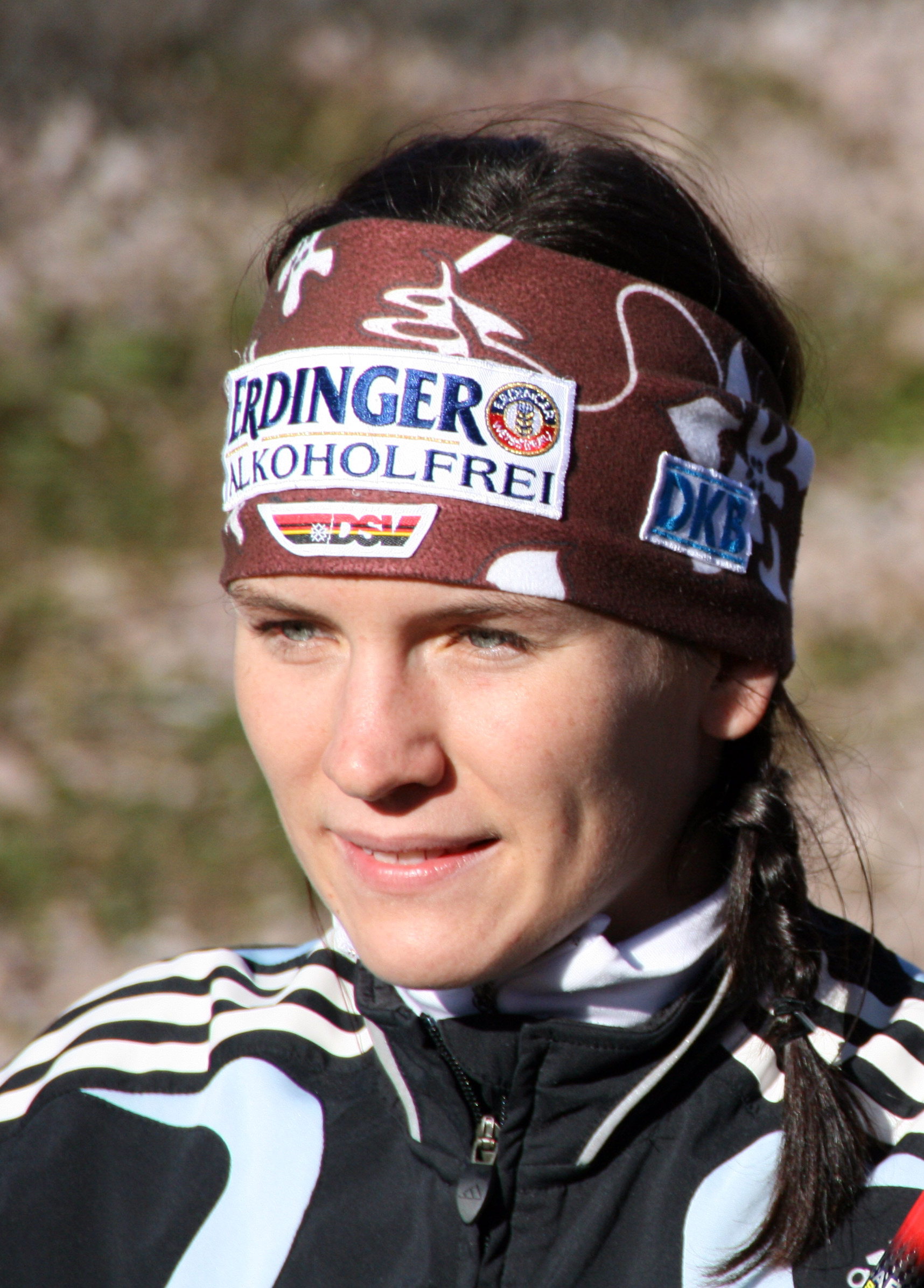
- Lang (then Hitzer) in 2007.

Personal information
- Full name: Kathrin Cornelia Lang
- Born: Kathrin Cornelia Hitzer; 3 September 1986 (age 39) Balingen, West Germany

Sport

Professional information
- Sport: Biathlon
- Club: TSV Siegsdorf
- World Cup debut: 29 November 2006
- Retired: 29 May 2014

World Championships
- Teams: 4 (2007, 2008, 2009, 2011)
- Medals: 0

World Cup
- Seasons: 8 (2006/07–2013/14)
- Individual victories: 2
- All victories: 8
- Individual podiums: 5
- All podiums: 15
Medal record
Women's biathlon
Representing Germany
European Championships
Gold medal – first place	2010 Otepää	15 km individual
Gold medal – first place	2010 Otepää	4 × 7.5 km relay
Silver medal – second place	2010 Otepää	10 km pursuit
Junior World Championships
Silver medal – second place	2004 Haute Maurienne	7.5 km sprint
Silver medal – second place	2005 Kontiolahti	3 × 6 km relay

Kathrin Cornelia Lang (née Hitzer; born 3 September 1986) is a former German biathlete. Because of her pregnancy by her boyfriend (now husband), biathlete Toni Lang, she finished the 2011/12 season in December 2011.

In her career, Lang won two World Cup races, the pursuit and the mass start in Khanty-Mansiysk in 2008.

She retired after the 2013–14 season, having not been selected for the national team.
