= Friedrich Pinter =

Austrian biathlete

Fritz Pinter
Personal information
- Full name: Friedrich Pinter
- Nickname: Fritz
- Born: 22 February 1978 (age 48) Villach, Carinthia, Austria
- Height: 1.87 m (6 ft 2 in)

Sport

Professional information
- Sport: Biathlon
- Club: SC St. Ulrich am Pillersee
- World Cup debut: 14 March 2002
- Retired: 4 May 2016

Olympic Games
- Teams: 3 (2006, 2014)
- Medals: 0

World Championships
- Teams: 6 (2005, 2007, 2008, 2009, 2012, 2013)
- Medals: 1 (0 gold)

World Cup
- Seasons: 15 (2001/02–2015/16)
- Individual victories: 0
- All victories: 2
- Individual podiums: 3
- All podiums: 11
Medal record
Men's biathlon
Representing Austria
World Championships
Bronze medal – third place	2005 Hochfilzen	4 × 7.5 km relay

Friedrich Pinter (born 22 February 1978) is an Austrian former biathlete.

== Life and career ==
Pinter announced his retirement after the 2015–16 season.

== Biathlon results ==
All results are sourced from the International Biathlon Union.

=== Olympic Games ===
Event	Individual	Sprint	Pursuit	Mass start	Relay	Mixed relay
(Italy) 2006 Turin	26th	—	—	—	17th	—N/a
(Russia) 2014 Sochi	—	—	—	—	—	9th

*The mixed relay was added as an event in 2014.

=== World Championships ===
1 medal (1 bronze)

Event	Individual	Sprint	Pursuit	Mass start	Relay	Mixed relay
(Austria) 2005 Hochfilzen	—	32nd	28th	—	Bronze	—
(Italy) 2007 Antholz-Anterselva	59th	28th	21st	—	6th	—
(Sweden) 2008 Östersund	31st	43rd	30th	—	4th	—
(South Korea) 2009 Pyeongchang	50th	—	—	—	—	—
(Germany) 2012 Ruhpolding	—	—	—	—	—	21st
(Czech Republic) 2013 Nové Město	67th	—	—	—	—	—

*During Olympic seasons competitions are only held for those events not included in the Olympic program.
