= Wang Chunli =

Chinese biathlete and cross-country skier

Medal record

Women's biathlon

Representing China

Asian Games
Gold medal – first place	2011 Astana-Almaty	7.5 km sprint
Silver medal – second place	2011 Astana-Almaty	4×6 km relay

Wang Chunli (simplified Chinese: 王春丽; traditional Chinese: 王春麗; pinyin: Wáng Chūnlì; born August 10, 1983, in Jilin) is a Chinese biathlete and cross-country skier.

== Career ==
She competed for China at the 2006 Winter Olympics in cross-country skiing. She also competed in the biathlon for China at the 2010 Winter Olympics. Her only one world cup victory came in the 2008/09 season under a sprint. She won it in front of Tora Berger and Magdalena Neuner.
