= Sylvie Becaert =

French biathlete (born 1975)

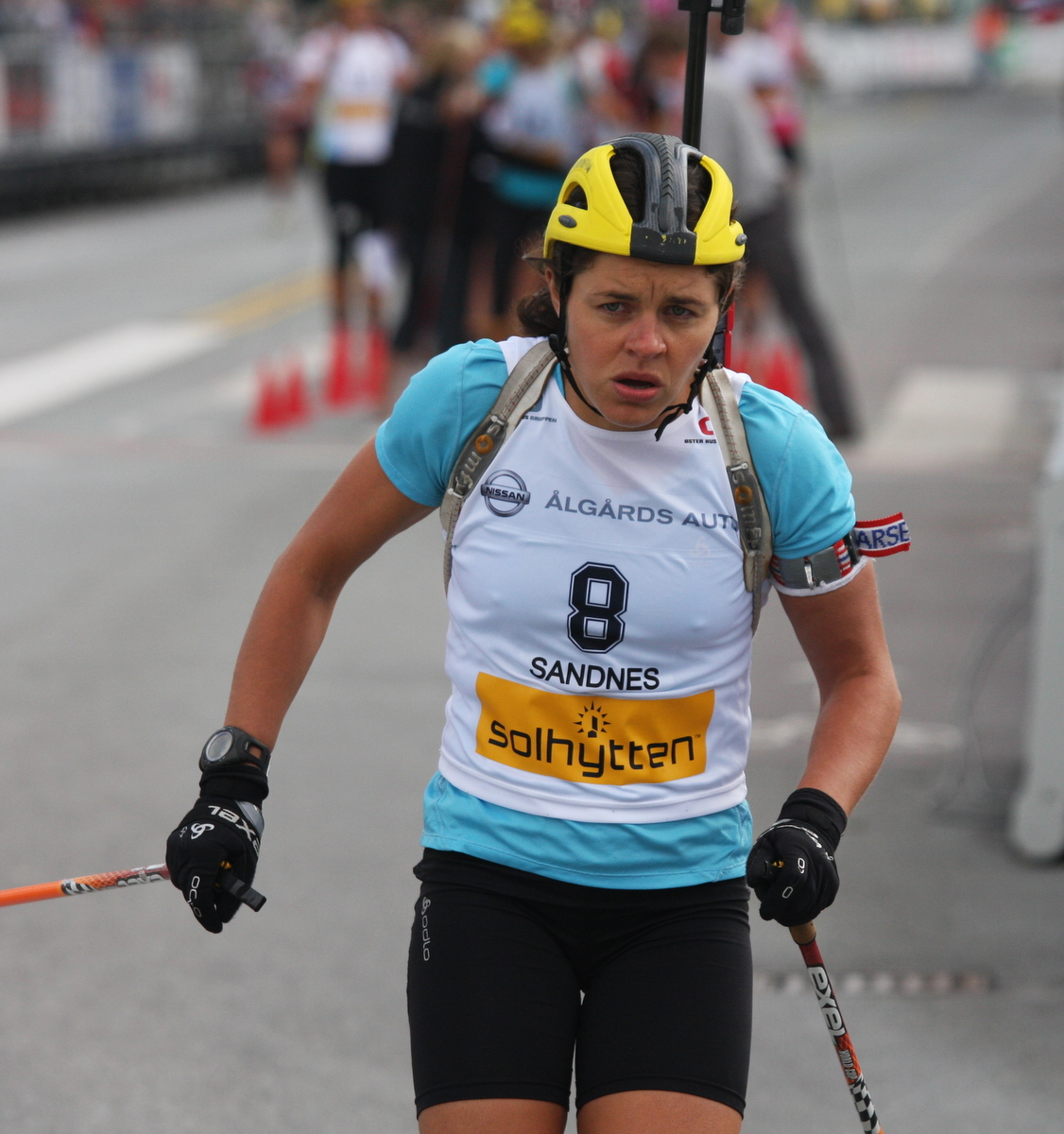

Medal record

Women's biathlon

Representing France

Olympic Games
Silver medal – second place	2010 Vancouver	4 × 6 km relay
Bronze medal – third place	2006 Turin	4 × 6 km relay

World Championships
Gold medal – first place	2003 Khanty-Mansiysk	7.5 km sprint
Gold medal – first place	2009 Pyeongchang	Mixed relay
Bronze medal – third place	2009 Pyeongchang	4 × 6 km relay

Sylvie Becaert (born 6 September 1975 in Lille) is a French biathlete. Becaert's best year so far was 2003 when she came third in the overall world cup standings and won gold in the sprint event at the World Championships 2003 in Khanty-Mansiysk. At the 2006 Olympics in Turin, she won a bronze medal with the French relay team behind Russia and Germany. In 2009 at the World Championships in Pyeongchang, Becaert was part of the victorious mixed relay team

Becaert retired after the 2009–10 season.
