= 2009–10 Biathlon World Cup – Mass start Men =

The 2009–10 Biathlon World Cup – Mass start Men started on Sunday, January 10, 2010, in Oberhof and finished on Saturday, March 27, 2010, in Khanty-Mansiysk. Defending titlist was Dominik Landertinger of Austria.

== Competition format ==
In the mass start, all biathletes start at the same time and the first across the finish line wins. In this 15.0 kilometres (9.3 mi) competition, the distance is skied over five laps; there are four bouts of shooting (two prone, two standing, in that order) with the first shooting bout being at the lane corresponding to your bib (Bib #10 shoots at lane #10 regardless of position in race.) with rest of the shooting bouts being at the lane in the position they arrived (Arrive at the lane in fifth place, you shoot at lane five.). As in sprint races, competitors must ski one 150 m penalty loop for each miss. Here again, to avoid unwanted congestion, World Cup Mass starts are held with only the 30 top ranking athletes on the start line (half that of the Pursuit as here all contestants start simultaneously).

== 2008–09 Top 3 Standings ==
Medal	Athlete	Points
Gold:	(Austria) Dominik Landertinger	208
Silver:	(Norway) Ole Einar Bjørndalen	199
Bronze:	(Austria) Christoph Sumann	197

== Medal winners ==
Event:	Gold:	Time	Silver:	Time	Bronze:	Time
Oberhof details	Ole Einar Bjørndalen; Norway	38:57.3 (0+1+0+0)	Tim Burke; United States	40:00.2 (0+1+1+0)	Tomasz Sikora; Poland	40:37.9 (0+0+1+2)
Ruhpolding details	Emil Hegle Svendsen; Norway	39:19.5 (0+0+0+0)	Evgeny Ustyugov; Russia	39:24.6 (0+0+0+1)	Simon Eder; Austria	39:29.4 (0+0+1+0)
2010 Winter Olympics details	Evgeny Ustyugov; Russia	35:35.7 (0+0+0+0)	Martin Fourcade; France	35:46.2 (2+0+0+1)	Pavol Hurajt; Slovakia	35:52.3 (0+0+0+0)
Oslo details	Ivan Tcherezov; Russia	40:10.1 (0+0+0+0)	Christoph Sumann; Austria	40:36.4 (2+0+0+1)	Emil Hegle Svendsen; Norway	40:44.7 (0+1+0+1)
Khanty-Mansiysk details	Dominik Landertinger; Austria	38:19.8 (1+0+0+0)	Arnd Peiffer; Germany	38:23.4 (0+0+0+0)	Halvard Hanevold; Norway	38:31.0 (0+0+0+0)

== Standings ==
#	Name	OBE	RUH	OLY	OSL	KHA	Total
1	Evgeny Ustyugov (RUS)	43	54	60	40	~~13~~	197
2	Emil Hegle Svendsen (NOR)	~~18~~	60	28	48	27	163
3	Arnd Peiffer (GER)	40	43	24	~~14~~	54	161
4	Christoph Sumann (AUT)	27	36	43	54	~~18~~	160
5	Dominik Landertinger (AUT)	~~25~~	34	36	27	60	157
6	Ivan Tcherezov (RUS)	~~24~~	24	38	60	32	154
7	Ole Einar Bjørndalen (NOR)	60	38	~~14~~	28	26	152
8	Martin Fourcade (FRA)	~~20~~	40	54	20	38	152
9	Simon Fourcade (FRA)	36	~~27~~	27	38	40	141
10	Simon Eder (AUT)	23	48	~~16~~	23	43	137
11	Halvard Hanevold (NOR)	31	~~20~~	22	32	48	133
12	Vincent Jay (FRA)	~~19~~	30	34	36	31	131
13	Daniel Mesotitsch (AUT)	~~15~~	28	40	30	30	128
14	Tim Burke (USA)	54	22	23	~~18~~	25	124
15	Andreas Birnbacher (GER)	~~14~~	31	26	43	23	123
16	Alexander Os (NOR)	38	32	–	29	20	119
17	Maxim Tchoudov (RUS)	29	25	–	34	24	112
18	Michael Greis (GER)	30	21	31	~~16~~	29	111
19	Tomasz Sikora (POL)	48	–	30	24	–	102
20	Andriy Deryzemlya (UKR)	17	–	15	31	34	97
21	Björn Ferry (SWE)	–	23	29	25	15	92
22	Anton Shipulin (RUS)	28	29	19	13	–	89
23	Pavol Hurajt (SVK)	–	–	48	12	28	88
24	Klemen Bauer (SLO)	26	~~12~~	13	26	22	87
25	Carl Johan Bergman (SWE)	13	26	–	22	11	72
26	Jean-Philippe Leguellec (CAN)	22	19	~~11~~	17	14	72
27	Michal Šlesingr (CZE)	–	–	25	21	21	67
28	Sergey Novikov (BLR)	16	14	21	15	~~12~~	66
29	Serguei Sednev (UKR)	11	–	20	11	19	61
30	Christoph Stephan (GER)	–	–	18	19	17	54
31	Nikolay Kruglov (RUS)	34	13	–	–	–	47
32	Friedrich Pinter (AUT)	12	18	–	–	16	46
33	Victor Vasilyev (RUS)	21	17	–	–	–	38
34	Christian De Lorenzi (ITA)	–	–	–	–	36	36
35	Jakov Fak (CRO)	–	–	32	–	–	32
36	Lars Berger (NOR)	32	–	–	–	–	32
37	Thomas Frei (SUI)	–	–	17	–	–	17
38	Fredrik Lindström (SWE)	–	16	–	–	–	16
39	Jaroslav Soukup (CZE)	–	15	–	–	–	15
40	Jeremy Teela (USA)	–	–	12	–	–	12
41	Tarjei Bø (NOR)	–	11	–	–	–	11
