= 2009–10 Biathlon World Cup – Relay Women =

The 2009–10 Biathlon World Cup – Relay Women will start at Sunday December 6, 2009 in Östersund and will finish Tuesday February 23, 2009 in Vancouver at the olympic Biathlon event. Defending titlist is German team.

== Competition format ==
The relay teams consist of four biathletes, who each ski 6 kilometres (3.7 mi), each leg skied over three laps, with two shooting rounds; one prone, one standing. For every round of five targets there are eight bullets available, though the last three can only be single-loaded manually one at a time from spare round holders or bullets deposited by the competitor into trays or onto the mat at the firing line. If after eight bullets there are still misses, one 150 m penalty loop must be taken for each missed target remaining. The first-leg participants start all at the same time, and as in cross-country skiing relays, every athlete of a team must touch the team's next-leg participant to perform a valid changeover. On the first shooting stage of the first leg, the participant must shoot in the lane corresponding to their bib number (Bib #10 shoots at lane #10 regardless of position in race.), then for the remainder of the relay, the relay team shoots at the lane in the position they arrived (Arrive at the range in 5th place, you shoot at lane five.).

== 2008–09 Top 3 Standings ==
Medal	Country	Points
Gold:	Germany	288
Silver:	France	242
Bronze:	Ukraine	232

== Medal winners ==
Event:	Gold:	Time	Silver:	Time	Bronze:	Time
Östersund details	Germany; Martina Beck; Andrea Henkel; Simone Hauswald; Kati Wilhelm	1:10:52.5 (0+1) (0+1) (0+0) (0+2) (0+1) (0+1) (0+2) (0+1)	Russia; Svetlana Sleptsova; Anna Boulygina; Olga Zaitseva; Olga Medvedtseva	1:11:10.9 (0+2) (0+1) (0+0) (0+0) (0+0) (0+3) (0+2) (0+1)	France; Marie-Laure Brunet; Sylvie Becaert; Marie Dorin; Sandrine Bailly	1:12:17.7 (0+0) (0+2) (0+2) (0+1) (0+0) (0+1) (0+2) (0+2)
Hochfilzen details	Russia; Svetlana Sleptsova; Anna Boulygina; Iana Romanova; Olga Zaitseva	1:13:37.0 (0+1) (0+2) (0+1) (0+0) (0+0) (0+1) (0+1) (0+0)	France; Marie-Laure Brunet; Sylvie Becaert; Marie Dorin; Sandrine Bailly	1:13:40.8 (0+0) (0+2) (0+0) (0+1) (0+1) (0+0) (0+1) (0+2)	Sweden; Elisabeth Högberg; Anna Carin Olofsson-Zidek; Anna Maria Nilsson; Helena Jonsson	1:13:41.6 (0+0) (0+0) (0+0) (0+1) (0+2) (0+0) (0+0) (0+0)
Oberhof details	Russia; Anna Bogaliy-Titovets; Anna Boulygina; Olga Medvedtseva; Svetlana Sleptsova	1:14:23.6 (0+3) (0+2) (0+0) (0+0) (0+1) (0+0) (0+2) (0+0)	Germany; Martina Beck; Simone Hauswald; Tina Bachmann; Andrea Henkel	1:14:23.9 (0+1) (0+2) (0+0) (0+3) (0+2) (0+3) (0+0) (0+0)	France; Marie-Laure Brunet; Sylvie Becaert; Marie Dorin; Sandrine Bailly	1:15:24.5 (0+0) (0+0) (0+1) (0+3) (0+0) (0+1) (0+2) (0+1)
Ruhpolding details	Sweden; Elisabeth Högberg; Anna Carin Olofsson-Zidek; Anna Maria Nilsson; Helena Jonsson	1:17:31.5 (0+1) (0+1) (0+0) (0+1) (0+1) (0+1) (0+0) (0+1)	Russia; Iana Romanova; Anna Boulygina; Olga Medvedtseva; Olga Zaitseva	1:17:48.1 (0+0) (0+0) (0+3) (0+1) (0+1) (0+1) (0+2) (0+0)	Norway; Liv Kjersti Eikeland; Ann Kristin Flatland; Solveig Rogstad; Tora Berger	1:18:00.5 (0+0) (0+1) (0+2) (0+1) (0+0) (0+0) (0+0) (0+2)
2010 Winter Olympics details	Russia; Svetlana Sleptsova; Anna Bogaliy-Titovets; Olga Medvedtseva; Olga Zaitseva	1:09:36.3 (0+0) (0+0) (0+1) (0+1) (0+0) (0+0) (0+1) (0+2)	France; Marie-Laure Brunet; Sylvie Becaert; Marie Dorin; Sandrine Bailly	1:10:09.1 (0+0) (0+2) (0+0) (0+1) (2+3) (0+1) (0+1) (0+0)	Germany; Kati Wilhelm; Simone Hauswald; Martina Beck; Andrea Henkel	1:10:13.4 (0+1) (0+0) (0+0) (0+0) (0+1) (0+1) (0+0) (0+2)

== Standings ==
#	Name	ÖST	HOC	OBE	RUH	OLY	Total
1	Russia	~~54~~	60	60	54	60	234
2	Germany	60	~~43~~	54	43	48	205
3	France	48	54	48	~~34~~	54	204
4	Sweden	43	48	~~40~~	60	40	191
5	Norway	34	40	~~31~~	48	43	165
6	Ukraine	38	32	43	~~29~~	38	151
7	China	40	34	36	40	~~32~~	150
8	Belarus	32	~~31~~	38	32	36	138
9	Poland	36	38	32	–	29	135
10	Slovenia	31	36	34	–	34	135
11	Czech Republic	28	29	–	38	25	120
12	Kazakhstan	30	~~27~~	30	31	27	118
13	Romania	27	~~24~~	28	30	31	116
14	Slovakia	29	26	–	23	28	106
15	Latvia	23	23	29	26	~~22~~	101
16	Italy	–	30	–	36	30	96
17	Estonia	22	22	–	27	23	94
18	Bulgaria	25	20	26	21	–	92
19	Finland	26	25	–	28	–	79
19	Canada	–	28	–	25	26	79
21	Japan	–	21	27	24	–	72
22	United States	–	–	–	22	24	46
23	Austria	24	18	–	–	–	42
24	South Korea	21	19	–	–	–	40
25	Croatia	–	17	–	–	–	17
