= 2009–10 Biathlon World Cup – Mass start Women =

The 2009–10 Biathlon World Cup – Mass start Women will start at Sunday January 10, 2010 in Oberhof and will finish Saturday March 27, 2010 in Khanty-Mansiysk. Defending titlist is Helena Jonsson of Sweden.

== Competition format ==
In the mass start, all biathletes start at the same time and the first across the finish line wins. In this 12.5 kilometres (7.8 mi) competition, the distance is skied over five laps; there are four bouts of shooting (two prone, two standing, in that order) with the first shooting bout being at the lane corresponding to your bib (Bib #10 shoots at lane #10 regardless of position in race.) with rest of the shooting bouts being at the lane in the position they arrived (Arrive at the lane in fifth place, you shoot at lane five.). As in sprint races, competitors must ski one 150 m penalty loop for each miss. Here again, to avoid unwanted congestion, World Cup Mass starts are held with only the 30 top ranking athletes on the start line (half that of the Pursuit as here all contestants start simultaneously).

== 2008–09 Top 3 Standings ==
| Medal | Athlete | Points |
|---|---|---|
| Gold: | (Sweden) Helena Jonsson | 210 |
| Silver: | (Germany) Kati Wilhelm | 186 |
| Bronze: | (Germany) Simone Hauswald | 174 |

== Medal winners ==
| Event: | Gold: | Time | Silver: | Time | Bronze: | Time |
|---|---|---|---|---|---|---|
| Oberhof details | Andrea Henkel; Germany | 40:53.6 (1+1+0+0) | Helena Jonsson; Sweden | 41:17.0 (0+1+0+1) | Tora Berger; Norway | 41:33.9 (0+0+0+2) |
| Ruhpolding details | Helena Jonsson; Sweden | 40:58.7 (0+0+0+0) | Simone Hauswald; Germany | 41:21.8 (0+1+1+0) | Magdalena Neuner; Germany | 41:33.7 (1+1+1+2) |
| 2010 Winter Olympics details | Magdalena Neuner; Germany | 32:37.5 (1+0+1+0) | Olga Zaitseva; Russia | 32:25.1 (0+0+1+0) | Simone Hauswald; Germany | 35:26.9 (0+0+2+0) |
| Oslo details | Simone Hauswald; Germany | 37:00.7 (1+1+0+0) | Vita Semerenko; Ukraine | 37:15.4 (0+0+0+0) | Magdalena Neuner; Germany | 37:22.9 (0+1+1+1) |
| Khanty-Mansiysk details | Magdalena Neuner; Germany | 36:20.0 (0+0+2+1) | Sandrine Bailly; France | 36:37.2 (0+0+1+0) | Anastasiya Kuzmina; Slovakia | 36:43.6 (0+0+0+1) |

== Standings ==
| # | Name | OBE | RUH | OLY | OSL | KHA | Total |
|---|---|---|---|---|---|---|---|
| 1 | Magdalena Neuner (GER) | – | 48 | 60 | 48 | 60 | 216 |
| 2 | Simone Hauswald (GER) | 36 | 54 | 48 | 60 | ~~23~~ | 198 |
| 3 | Andrea Henkel (GER) | 60 | 34 | 32 | 43 | ~~28~~ | 169 |
| 4 | Helena Jonsson (SWE) | 54 | 60 | 31 | ~~13~~ | 21 | 166 |
| 5 | Olga Zaitseva (RUS) | 38 | 26 | 54 | ~~19~~ | 36 | 154 |
| 6 | Sandrine Bailly (FRA) | 27 | 0 | 36 | 26 | 54 | 143 |
| 7 | Kati Wilhelm (GER) | 31 | 40 | ~~16~~ | 31 | 38 | 140 |
| 8 | Darya Domracheva (BLR) | 32 | 36 | 38 | 34 | ~~27~~ | 140 |
| 9 | Tora Berger (NOR) | 48 | 28 | 23 | ~~22~~ | 40 | 139 |
| 10 | Martina Beck (GER) | 43 | 43 | – | 36 | 12 | 134 |
| 11 | Teja Gregorin (SLO) | ~~23~~ | 38 | 40 | 30 | 25 | 133 |
| 12 | Marie-Laure Brunet (FRA) | 26 | 32 | 26 | ~~20~~ | 43 | 127 |
| 13 | Vita Semerenko (UKR) | 40 | – | – | 54 | 31 | 125 |
| 14 | Olga Medvedtseva (RUS) | 15 | 31 | 43 | – | 32 | 121 |
| 15 | Anna Carin Olofsson-Zidek (SWE) | 29 | 23 | 28 | 32 | ~~18~~ | 112 |
| 16 | Kaisa Mäkäräinen (FIN) | 21 | 30 | – | 25 | 30 | 106 |
| 17 | Anastasiya Kuzmina (SVK) | – | – | 34 | 23 | 48 | 105 |
| 18 | Tina Bachmann (GER) | 28 | 29 | – | 17 | 24 | 98 |
| 19 | Marie Dorin (FRA) | ~~13~~ | 20 | 25 | 24 | 29 | 98 |
| 20 | Valj Semerenko (UKR) | 18 | – | 22 | 40 | 17 | 97 |
| 21 | Anna Boulygina (RUS) | 30 | 21 | ~~11~~ | 29 | 16 | 96 |
| 22 | Svetlana Sleptsova (RUS) | 25 | – | 27 | 15 | 26 | 93 |
| 23 | Iana Romanova (RUS) | – | 19 | – | 38 | 34 | 91 |
| 24 | Ann Kristin Flatland (NOR) | – | 17 | 30 | 27 | 14 | 88 |
| 25 | Nadezhda Skardino (BLR) | 24 | 25 | 19 | ~~14~~ | 15 | 83 |
| 26 | Olena Pidhrushna (UKR) | 22 | – | 29 | 12 | 13 | 76 |
| 27 | Liudmila Kalinchik (BLR) | – | 15 | 24 | 18 | 19 | 76 |
| 28 | Sylvie Becaert (FRA) | 12 | 22 | – | 16 | 22 | 72 |
| 29 | Anna Bogaliy-Titovets (RUS) | 34 | – | – | 28 | – | 62 |
| 30 | Zina Kocher (CAN) | 16 | 24 | – | 11 | 11 | 62 |
| 31 | Oksana Khvostenko (UKR) | – | – | 12 | 21 | 20 | 53 |
| 32 | Wang Chunli (CHN) | 17 | 27 | – | – | – | 44 |
| 33 | Agnieszka Cyl (POL) | 20 | – | 18 | – | – | 38 |
| 34 | Song Chaoqing (CHN) | 19 | 16 | – | – | – | 35 |
| 35 | Kong Yingchao (CHN) | 14 | 13 | – | – | – | 27 |
| 36 | Krystyna Pałka (POL) | – | – | 21 | – | – | 21 |
| 37 | Weronika Novakowska (POL) | – | – | 20 | – | – | 20 |
| 38 | Juliane Doll (GER) | – | 18 | – | – | – | 18 |
| 39 | Éva Tófalvi (ROU) | – | – | 17 | – | – | 17 |
| 40 | Andreja Mali (SLO) | – | – | 15 | – | – | 15 |
| 41 | Julie Carraz-Collin (FRA) | – | 14 | – | – | – | 14 |
| 41 | Elena Khrustaleva (KAZ) | – | – | 14 | – | – | 14 |
| 43 | Anna Maria Nilsson (SWE) | – | – | 13 | – | – | 13 |
| 44 | Natalia Levchenkova (MDA) | – | 12 | – | – | – | 12 |
