= 2009–10 Biathlon World Cup – World Cup 3 =

Coordinates: 46°21′N 14°01′E

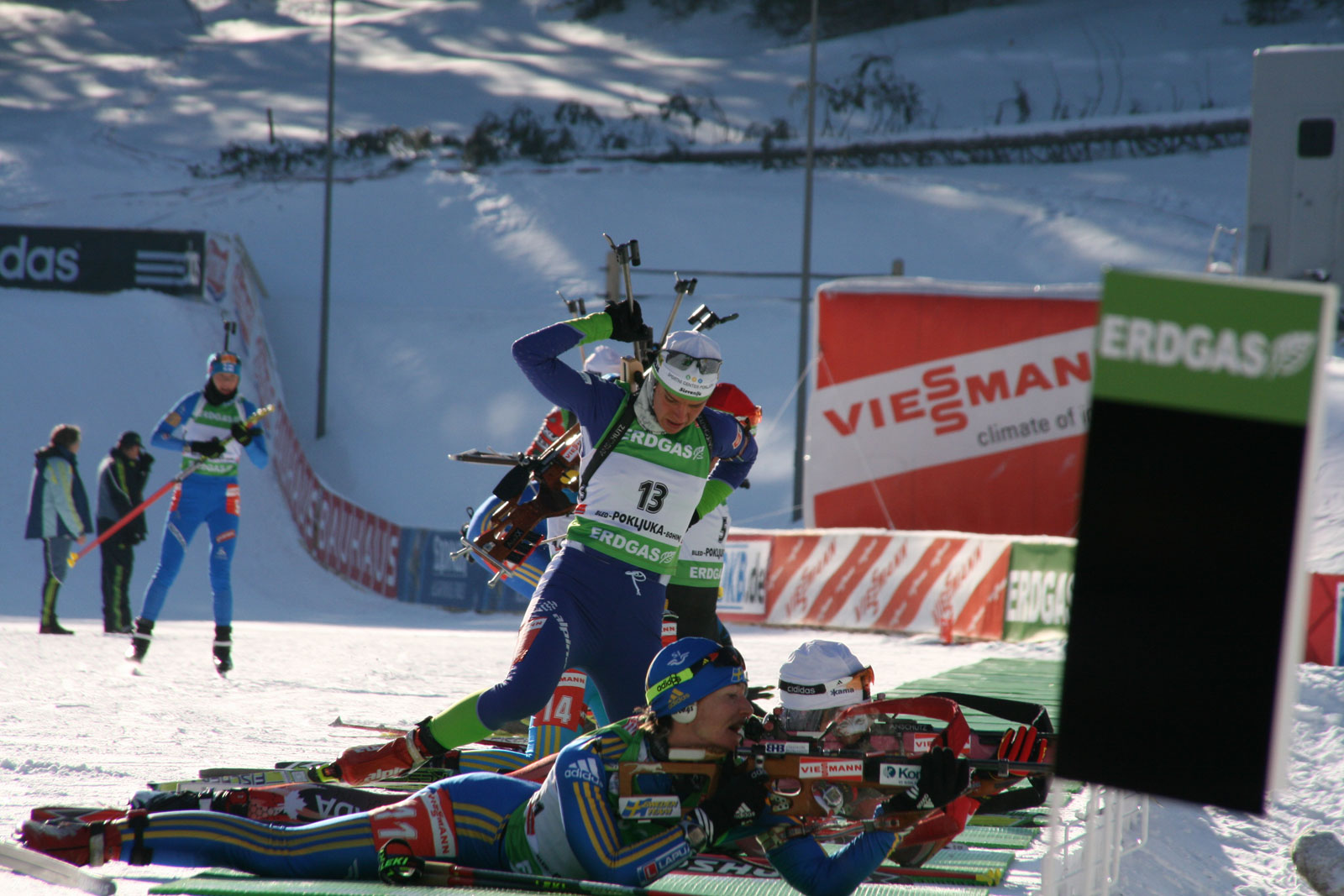
Pokljuka biathlon world cup in 2009

The 2009–10 Biathlon World Cup – World Cup 3 is the third event of the season and was held in Pokljuka, Slovenia from Thursday December 17 until Sunday December 20, 2009.

== Schedule of events ==
The schedule of the event is below

Date	Time	Events
December 17	11:15 cet	Women's 15 km Individual
December 17	14:15 cet	Men's 20 km Individual
December 19	10:00 cet	Women's 7.5 km Sprint
December 19	14:15 cet	Men's 10 km Sprint
December 20	12:00 cet	Women's 10 km Pursuit
December 20	14:15 cet	Men's 12.5 km Pursuit

== Medal winners ==
=== Men ===
Event:	Gold:	Time	Silver:	Time	Bronze:	Time
20 km Individual details	Christoph Sumann; Austria	52:19.8 (0+0+0+1)	Simon Fourcade; France	52:34.0 (0+0+1+0)	Alexander Os; Norway	52:50.5 (0+0+0+1)
10 km Sprint details	Ivan Tcherezov; Russia	28:10.0 (0+0)	Dominik Landertinger; Austria	28:21.1 (1+0)	Thomas Frei; Switzerland	28:52.4 (1+0)
12.5 km Pursuit details	Evgeny Ustyugov; Russia	34:50.9 (0+1+1+0)	Roland Lessing; Estonia	35:00.2 (0+0+0+0)	Simon Eder; Austria	35:01.8 (1+0+0+1)

=== Women ===
Event:	Gold:	Time	Silver:	Time	Bronze:	Time
15 km Individual details	Helena Jonsson; Sweden	43:04.1 (0+0+0+0)	Anna Carin Olofsson-Zidek; Sweden	43:26.7 (1+0+0+0)	Anastasiya Kuzmina; Slovakia	43:31.4 (1+0+0+0)
7.5 km Sprint details	Svetlana Sleptsova; Russia	24:57.0 (0+0)	Anna Bogaliy-Titovets; Russia	25:40.4 (1+0)	Magdalena Neuner; Germany	25:59.6 (1+1)
10 km Pursuit details	Svetlana Sleptsova; Russia	34:03.2 (0+1+0+1)	Magdalena Neuner; Germany	34:39.5 (1+1+1+0)	Anna Bogaliy-Titovets; Russia	34:46.4 (0+1+1+0)

== Achievements ==
Best performance for all time

- Victor Vasilyev (RUS), 13 place in Individual
- Evgeny Abramenko (BLR), 19 place in Individual
- Scott Perras (CAN), 32 place in Individual
- Tarjei Bø (NOR), 37 place in Individual and 4 place in Sprint
- Alexandr Trifonov (KAZ), 69 place in Individual
- Alexei Almoukov (AUS), 76 place in Individual
- Miroslav Kenanov (BUL), 96 place in Individual
- Thomas Frei (SUI), 3 place in Sprint
- Anton Shipulin (RUS), 5 place in Sprint
- Hidenori Isa (JPN), 10 place in Sprint
- Serhiy Semenov (UKR), 19 place in Sprint
- Krasimir Anev (BUL), 25 place in Sprint
- Vasja Rupnik (SLO), 37 place in Sprint and 36 place in Pursuit
- Michael Hauser (AUT), 49 place in Sprint and Pursuit
- Roland Gerbacea (ROU), 53 place in Sprint
- Nikolay Braichenko (KAZ), 56 place in Sprint and 46 place in Pursuit
- Milanko Petrovic (SRB), 82 place in Sprint
- Łukasz Witek (POL), 91 place in Sprint
- Evgeny Ustyugov (RUS), 1 place in Pursuit
- Roland Lessing (EST), 2 place in Pursuit
- Klemen Bauer (SLO), 7 place in Pursuit
- Iana Romanova (RUS), 4 place in Individual
- Julie Carraz-Collin (FRA), 11 place in Individual
- Selina Gasparin (SUI), 19 place in Individual
- Haley Johnson (USA), 21 place in Individual
- Natalya Burdyga (RUS), 22 place in Individual
- Anais Bescond (FRA), 29 place in Individual
- Megan Tandy (CAN), 35 place in Individual and 21 place in Sprint
- Reka Ferencz (ROU), 37 place in Individual
- Emilia Yordanova (BUL), 49 place in Individual
- Lyubov Filimonova (KAZ), 55 place in Individual and 35 place in Sprint
- Zanna Juskane (LAT), 87 place in Individual
- Panagiota Tsakiri (GRE), 90 place in Individual
- Nadezhda Skardino (BLR), 8 place in Sprint
- Marina Lebedeva (KAZ), 15 place in Sprint
- Alexandra Stoian (ROU), 24 place in Sprint
- Karin Oberhofer (ITA), 29 place in Sprint
- Elisabeth Högberg (SWE), 32 place in Pursuit

First World Cup race

- Serhiy Semenov (UKR), 50 place in Individual
- Vitaliy Kilchytskyy (UKR), 70 place in Sprint
