= 2009–10 Biathlon World Cup – Relay Men =

The 2009–10 Biathlon World Cup – Relay Men will start at Sunday December 6, 2009 in Östersund and will finish Friday February 26, 2009 in Vancouver at the olympic Biathlon event. Defending titlist is Austrian team.

== Competition format ==
The relay teams consist of four biathletes, who each ski 7.5 kilometres (4.7 mi), each leg skied over three laps, with two shooting rounds; one prone, one standing. For every round of five targets there are eight bullets available, though the last three can only be single-loaded manually one at a time from spare round holders or bullets deposited by the competitor into trays or onto the mat at the firing line. If after eight bullets there are still misses, one 150 m penalty loop must be taken for each missed target remaining. The first-leg participants start all at the same time, and as in cross-country skiing relays, every athlete of a team must touch the team's next-leg participant to perform a valid changeover. On the first shooting stage of the first leg, the participant must shoot in the lane corresponding to their bib number (Bib #10 shoots at lane #10 regardless of position in race.), then for the remainder of the relay, the relay team shoots at the lane in the position they arrived (Arrive at the range in 5th place, you shoot at lane five.).

== 2008–09 Top 3 Standings ==
Medal	Country	Points
Gold:	Austria	276
Silver:	Norway	254
Bronze:	Germany	247

== Medal winners ==
Event:	Gold:	Time	Silver:	Time	Bronze:	Time
Östersund details	France; Vincent Jay; Vincent Defrasne; Simon Fourcade; Martin Fourcade	1:15:10.3 (0+1) (0+0) (0+0) (1+3) (0+0) (0+0) (0+2) (0+1)	Norway; Emil Hegle Svendsen; Alexander Os; Lars Berger; Ole Einar Bjørndalen	1:15:24.0 (0+1) (0+2) (0+1) (1+3) (0+0) (2+3) (0+0) (0+1)	Austria; Daniel Mesotitsch; Simon Eder; Dominik Landertinger; Christoph Sumann	1:15:28.5 (0+0) (1+3) (0+1) (0+3) (0+0) (0+0) (0+0) (0+1)
Hochfilzen details	Austria; Simon Eder; Daniel Mesotitsch; Dominik Landertinger; Christoph Sumann	1:16:13.1 (0+0) (0+0) (0+0) (0+1) (0+0) (0+1) (0+3) (0+1)	Russia; Ivan Tcherezov; Evgeny Ustyugov; Nikolay Kruglov; Maxim Tchoudov	1:16:38.8 (0+1) (0+0) (0+0) (0+0) (0+0) (1+3) (0+0) (0+1)	Germany; Christoph Stephan; Arnd Peiffer; Michael Greis; Simon Schempp	1:16:45.1 (0+0) (0+1) (0+0) (0+0) (0+2) (0+1) (0+0) (0+1)
Oberhof details	Norway; Halvard Hanevold; Tarjei Bø; Emil Hegle Svendsen; Ole Einar Bjørndalen	1:17:03.3 (0+0) (0+0) (0+2) (0+2) (0+0) (0+2) (0+0) (0+1)	France; Vincent Jay; Vincent Defrasne; Simon Fourcade; Martin Fourcade	1:17:30.8 (0+2) (0+2) (0+0) (0+3) (0+0) (0+0) (0+0) (0+0)	Germany; Christoph Stephan; Michael Greis; Arnd Peiffer; Simon Schempp	1:17:45.5 (0+1) (0+2) (0+1) (0+3) (0+2) (0+0) (0+0) (0+0)
Ruhpolding details	Russia; Ivan Tcherezov; Anton Shipulin; Maxim Tchoudov; Evgeny Ustyugov	1:22:29.8 (0+0) (0+0) (0+0) (0+0) (0+0) (0+0) (0+1) (0+1)	Norway; Halvard Hanevold; Tarjei Bø; Ole Einar Bjørndalen; Emil Hegle Svendsen	1:22:58.4 (0+0) (0+0) (0+1) (0+0) (0+1) (0+3) (0+1) (0+0)	Austria; Daniel Mesotitsch; Friedrich Pinter; Tobias Eberhard; Dominik Landertinger	1:24:04.6 (0+0) (0+2) (0+0) (0+2) (0+0) (0+1) (0+1) (1+3)
2010 Winter Olympics details	Norway; Halvard Hanevold; Tarjei Bø; Emil Hegle Svendsen; Ole Einar Bjørndalen	1:21:38.1 (0+1) (0+0) (0+1) (0+1) (0+1) (0+1) (0+2) (0+0)	Austria; Simon Eder; Daniel Mesotitsch; Dominik Landertinger; Christoph Sumann	1:22:16.7 (0+0) (0+1) (0+2) (0+1) (0+1) (0+0) (1+3) (0+0)	Russia; Ivan Tcherezov; Anton Shipulin; Maxim Tchoudov; Evgeny Ustyugov	1:22:16.9 (0+0) (0+1) (0+0) (0+0) (0+0) (0+0) (0+0) (0+3)

== Standings ==
#	Name	ÖST	HOC	OBE	RUH	OLY	Total
1	Norway	54	~~40~~	60	54	60	228
2	Austria	48	60	~~43~~	48	54	210
3	Russia	43	54	~~40~~	60	48	205
4	France	60	43	54	~~34~~	38	195
5	Germany	~~40~~	48	48	43	40	179
6	Sweden	38	38	~~31~~	36	43	155
7	Switzerland	~~32~~	34	38	40	32	144
8	United States	36	31	–	38	28	133
9	Czech Republic	30	36	–	31	36	133
10	Ukraine	34	~~21~~	34	29	34	131
11	Belarus	31	30	~~29~~	32	30	123
12	Italy	29	32	–	30	29	120
13	Canada	27	24	–	28	31	110
14	Latvia	24	~~20~~	36	25	22	107
15	Estonia	~~20~~	29	27	24	27	107
16	Slovenia	~~19~~	26	28	27	24	105
17	Japan	26	22	32	21	–	101
18	Bulgaria	22	23	30	~~20~~	25	100
19	Slovakia	23	27	–	22	26	98
20	Kazakhstan	~~21~~	25	26	23	23	97
21	Finland	25	28	0	26	–	79
22	Lithuania	16	18	23	18	–	75
23	Poland	28	19	25	–	–	72
24	United Kingdom	18	–	24	19	–	61
25	Serbia	17	17	–	17	–	51
26	Hungary	15	–	–	–	–	15
