= 2009–10 Biathlon World Cup =

Biathlon competition

Discipline	Men	Women
Overall	(Norway) Emil Hegle Svendsen	(Germany) Magdalena Neuner
Nations Cup	Norway	Germany
Individual	(Austria) Christoph Sumann	(Sweden) Anna Carin Zidek
Sprint	(Norway) Emil Hegle Svendsen	(Germany) Simone Hauswald
Pursuit	(France) Martin Fourcade	(Germany) Magdalena Neuner
Mass start	(Russia) Evgeny Ustyugov	(Germany) Magdalena Neuner
Relay	Norway	Russia

Competition

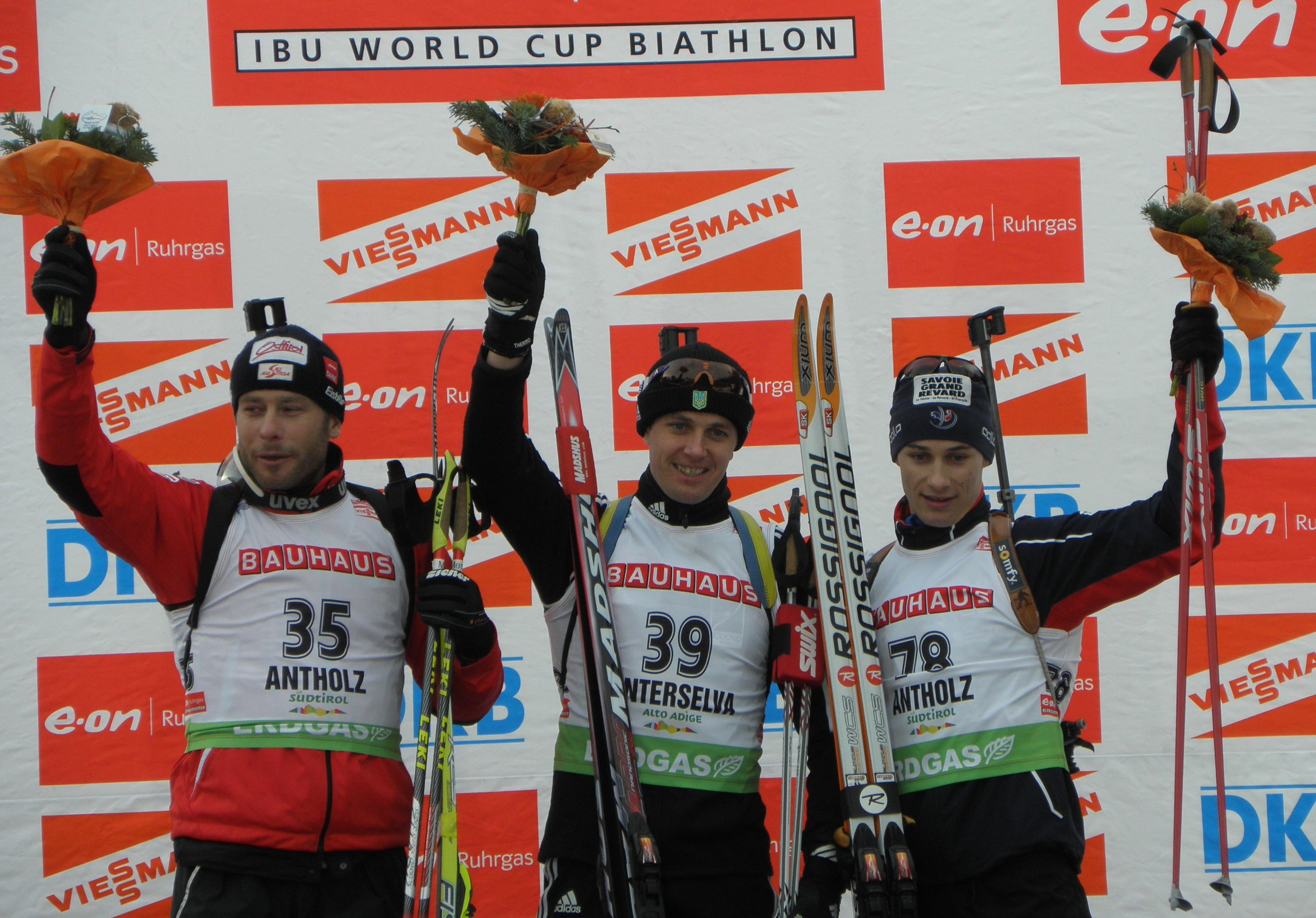
2009–10 Biathlon World Cup

The 2009–10 Biathlon World Cup was a multi-race tournament over a season of biathlon, organised by the International Biathlon Union. The season started 2 December 2009 in Östersund, Sweden and ended 28 March 2010 with the Mixed Relay World Championships in Khanty-Mansiysk, Russia. Races of the season were broadcast in Europe on Eurosport channel.

== Calendar ==
Below is the World Cup calendar for the 2009–10 season.

Location	Date	Individual	Sprint	Pursuit	Mass start	Relay	Details
(Sweden) Östersund	2–6 December	●	●			●	details
(Austria) Hochfilzen	11–13 December		●	●		●	details
(Slovenia) Pokljuka	17–20 December	●	●	●			details
(Germany) Oberhof	6–10 January		●		●	●	details
(Germany) Ruhpolding	13–17 January		●		●	●	details
(Italy) Antholz	20–24 January	●	●	●			details
(Canada) Vancouver	13–26 February	●	●	●	●	●	Winter Olympics
(Finland) Kontiolahti	12–14 March		●	●			details
(Norway) Oslo	18–21 March		●	●	●		details
(Russia) Khanty-Mansiysk	25–27 March		●		●		details
Total		4	10	6	5	5	

== World Cup podiums ==
=== Men ===
Stage	Date	Place	Discipline	Winner	Second	Third	Yellow bib (After competition)	Det.
1	3 December 2009	(Sweden) Östersund	20 km Individual	(Norway) Emil Hegle Svendsen	(United States) Tim Burke	(Austria) Christoph Sumann	(Norway) Emil Hegle Svendsen	Detail
1	5 December 2009	(Sweden) Östersund	10 km Sprint	(Norway) Ole Einar Bjørndalen	(Norway) Emil Hegle Svendsen	(United States) Tim Burke	(Norway) Emil Hegle Svendsen	Detail
2	11 December 2009	(Austria) Hochfilzen	10 km Sprint	(Norway) Ole Einar Bjørndalen	(Russia) Nikolay Kruglov	(Russia) Evgeny Ustyugov	(Norway) Emil Hegle Svendsen	Detail
2	12 December 2009	(Austria) Hochfilzen	12.5 km Pursuit	(Norway) Emil Hegle Svendsen	(Austria) Simon Eder	(Norway) Ole Einar Bjørndalen	(Norway) Emil Hegle Svendsen	Detail
3	17 December 2009	(Slovenia) Pokljuka	20 km Individual	(Austria) Christoph Sumann	(France) Simon Fourcade	(Norway) Alexander Os	(Austria) Christoph Sumann	Detail
3	19 December 2009	(Slovenia) Pokljuka	10 km Sprint	(Russia) Ivan Tcherezov	(Austria) Dominik Landertinger	(Switzerland) Thomas Frei	(Austria) Christoph Sumann	Detail
3	20 December 2009	(Slovenia) Pokljuka	12.5 km Pursuit	(Russia) Evgeny Ustyugov	(Estonia) Roland Lessing	(Austria) Simon Eder	(United States) Tim Burke	Detail
4	9 January 2010	(Germany) Oberhof	10 km Sprint	(Russia) Evgeny Ustyugov	(Germany) Michael Greis	(Sweden) Carl Johan Bergman	(Russia) Evgeny Ustyugov	Detail
4	10 January 2010	(Germany) Oberhof	15 km Mass Start	(Norway) Ole Einar Bjørndalen	(United States) Tim Burke	(Poland) Tomasz Sikora	(United States) Tim Burke	Detail
5	14 January 2010	(Germany) Ruhpolding	10 km Sprint	(Norway) Emil Hegle Svendsen	(Norway) Ole Einar Bjørndalen	(Germany) Michael Greis	(Russia) Evgeny Ustyugov	Detail
5	16 January 2010	(Germany) Ruhpolding	15 km Mass Start	(Norway) Emil Hegle Svendsen	(Russia) Evgeny Ustyugov	(Austria) Simon Eder	(Russia) Evgeny Ustyugov	Detail
6	21 January 2010	(Italy) Antholz-Anterselva	20 km Individual	(Ukraine) Serhiy Sednev	(Austria) Daniel Mesotitsch	(France) Alexis Bœuf	(Russia) Evgeny Ustyugov	Detail
6	23 January 2010	(Italy) Antholz-Anterselva	10 km Sprint	(Germany) Arnd Peiffer	(Austria) Dominik Landertinger	(Germany) Christoph Stephan	(Russia) Evgeny Ustyugov	Detail
6	24 January 2010	(Italy) Antholz-Anterselva	12.5 km Pursuit	(Austria) Daniel Mesotitsch	(Germany) Arnd Peiffer	(Austria) Dominik Landertinger	(France) Simon Fourcade	Detail
OG	14 February 2010	(Canada) Vancouver	10 km Sprint	(France) Vincent Jay	(Norway) Emil Hegle Svendsen	(Croatia) Jakov Fak	(Norway) Emil Hegle Svendsen	Detail
OG	16 February 2010	(Canada) Vancouver	12.5 km Pursuit	(Sweden) Björn Ferry	(Austria) Christoph Sumann	(France) Vincent Jay	(Austria) Christoph Sumann	Detail
OG	18 February 2010	(Canada) Vancouver	20 km Individual	(Norway) Emil Hegle Svendsen	(Norway) Ole Einar Bjørndalen	(Belarus) Sergey Novikov	(Norway) Emil Hegle Svendsen	Detail
OG	21 February 2010	(Canada) Vancouver	15 km Mass Start	(France) Martin Fourcade	(Slovakia) Pavol Hurajt	(Austria) Christoph Sumann	(Russia) Evgeny Ustyugov	Detail
7	13 March 2010	(Finland) Kontiolahti	10 km Sprint	(Russia) Ivan Tcherezov	(Norway) Emil Hegle Svendsen	(France) Martin Fourcade	(Norway) Emil Hegle Svendsen	Detail
7	14 March 2010	(Finland) Kontiolahti	12.5 km Pursuit	(France) Martin Fourcade	(Italy) Christian De Lorenzi	(France) Vincent Jay	(Norway) Emil Hegle Svendsen	Detail
8	18 March 2010	(Norway) Oslo Holmenkollen	10 km Sprint	(France) Martin Fourcade	(Russia) Maxim Tchoudov	(Austria) Christoph Sumann	(Norway) Emil Hegle Svendsen	Detail
8	20 March 2010	(Norway) Oslo Holmenkollen	12.5 km Pursuit	(France) Martin Fourcade	(Germany) Simon Schempp	(Russia) Ivan Tcherezov	(Norway) Emil Hegle Svendsen	Detail
8	21 March 2010	(Norway) Oslo Holmenkollen	15 km Mass Start	(Russia) Ivan Tcherezov	(Austria) Christoph Sumann	(Norway) Emil Hegle Svendsen	(Norway) Emil Hegle Svendsen	Detail
9	26 March 2010	(Russia) Khanty-Mansiysk	10 km Sprint	(Russia) Ivan Tcherezov	(Italy) Christian De Lorenzi	(Ukraine) Andriy Deryzemlya	(Norway) Emil Hegle Svendsen	Detail
9	27 March 2010	(Russia) Khanty-Mansiysk	15 km Mass Start	(Austria) Dominik Landertinger	(Germany) Arnd Peiffer	(Norway) Halvard Hanevold	(Norway) Emil Hegle Svendsen	Detail

=== Women ===
Stage	Date	Place	Discipline	Winner	Second	Third	Yellow bib (After competition)	Det.
1	2 December 2009	(Sweden) Östersund	15 km Individual	(Sweden) Helena Jonsson	(Sweden) Anna Carin Olofsson-Zidek	(Belarus) Darya Domracheva	(Sweden) Helena Jonsson	Detail
1	5 December 2009	(Sweden) Östersund	7.5 km Sprint	(Norway) Tora Berger	(Russia) Olga Medvedtseva	(Finland) Kaisa Mäkäräinen	(Sweden) Helena Jonsson	Detail
2	11 December 2009	(Austria) Hochfilzen	7.5 km Sprint	(Sweden) Anna Carin Olofsson-Zidek	(Sweden) Helena Jonsson	(Russia) Olga Zaitseva	(Sweden) Helena Jonsson	Detail
2	12 December 2009	(Austria) Hochfilzen	10 km Pursuit	(Sweden) Helena Jonsson	(Russia) Svetlana Sleptsova	(Russia) Olga Zaitseva	(Sweden) Helena Jonsson	Detail
3	17 December 2009	(Slovenia) Pokljuka	15 km Individual	(Sweden) Helena Jonsson	(Sweden) Anna Carin Olofsson-Zidek	(Slovakia) Anastázia Kuzminová	(Sweden) Helena Jonsson	Detail
3	19 December 2009	(Slovenia) Pokljuka	7.5 km Sprint	(Russia) Svetlana Sleptsova	(Russia) Anna Bogaliy-Titovets	(Germany) Magdalena Neuner	(Sweden) Helena Jonsson	Detail
3	20 December 2009	(Slovenia) Pokljuka	10 km Pursuit	(Russia) Svetlana Sleptsova	(Germany) Magdalena Neuner	(Russia) Anna Bogaliy-Titovets	(Sweden) Helena Jonsson	Detail
4	8 January 2010	(Germany) Oberhof	7.5 km Sprint	(Germany) Simone Hauswald	(Sweden) Helena Jonsson	(Norway) Ann Kristin Flatland	(Sweden) Helena Jonsson	Detail
4	10 January 2010	(Germany) Oberhof	12.5 km Mass Start	(Germany) Andrea Henkel	(Sweden) Helena Jonsson	(Norway) Tora Berger	(Sweden) Helena Jonsson	Detail
5	13 January 2010	(Germany) Ruhpolding	7.5 km Sprint	(Sweden) Anna Carin Olofsson-Zidek	(Russia) Olga Medvedtseva	(Germany) Magdalena Neuner	(Sweden) Helena Jonsson	Detail
5	16 January 2010	(Germany) Ruhpolding	12.5 km Mass Start	(Sweden) Helena Jonsson	(Germany) Simone Hauswald	(Germany) Magdalena Neuner	(Sweden) Helena Jonsson	Detail
6	20 January 2010	(Italy) Antholz-Anterselva	15 km Individual	(Germany) Magdalena Neuner	(Germany) Kati Wilhelm	(Germany) Andrea Henkel	(Sweden) Helena Jonsson	Detail
6	22 January 2010	(Italy) Antholz-Anterselva	7.5 km Sprint	(Germany) Magdalena Neuner	(Germany) Andrea Henkel	(France) Sandrine Bailly	(Sweden) Helena Jonsson	Detail
6	24 January 2010	(Italy) Antholz-Anterselva	10 km Pursuit	(Germany) Andrea Henkel	(Germany) Magdalena Neuner	(Norway) Ann Kristin Flatland	(Sweden) Helena Jonsson	Detail
OG	13 February 2010	(Canada) Vancouver	7.5 km Sprint	(Slovakia) Anastázia Kuzminová	(Germany) Magdalena Neuner	(France) Marie Dorin	(Sweden) Helena Jonsson	Detail
OG	16 February 2010	(Canada) Vancouver	10 km Pursuit	(Germany) Magdalena Neuner	(Slovakia) Anastázia Kuzminová	(France) Marie-Laure Brunet	(Sweden) Helena Jonsson	Detail
OG	18 February 2010	(Canada) Vancouver	15 km Individual	(Norway) Tora Berger	(Kazakhstan) Elena Khrustaleva	(Belarus) Darya Domracheva	(Sweden) Helena Jonsson	Detail
OG	21 February 2010	(Canada) Vancouver	12.5 km Mass Start	(Germany) Magdalena Neuner	(Russia) Olga Zaitseva	(Germany) Simone Hauswald	(Sweden) Helena Jonsson	Detail
7	13 March 2010	(Finland) Kontiolahti	7.5 km Sprint	(Belarus) Darya Domracheva	(Russia) Olga Zaitseva	(Germany) Kati Wilhelm	(Germany) Magdalena Neuner	Detail
7	14 March 2010	(Finland) Kontiolahti	10 km Pursuit	(Belarus) Darya Domracheva	(Germany) Magdalena Neuner	(Germany) Simone Hauswald	(Germany) Magdalena Neuner	Detail
8	18 March 2010	(Norway) Oslo Holmenkollen	7.5 km Sprint	(Germany) Simone Hauswald	(Belarus) Darya Domracheva	(Sweden) Anna Carin Olofsson-Zidek	(Germany) Magdalena Neuner	Detail
8	20 March 2010	(Norway) Oslo Holmenkollen	10 km Pursuit	(Germany) Simone Hauswald	(Belarus) Darya Domracheva	(Sweden) Anna Carin Olofsson-Zidek	(Germany) Magdalena Neuner	Detail
8	21 March 2010	(Norway) Oslo Holmenkollen	12.5 km Mass Start	(Germany) Simone Hauswald	(Ukraine) Vita Semerenko	(Germany) Magdalena Neuner	(Germany) Magdalena Neuner	Detail
9	25 March 2010	(Russia) Khanty-Mansiysk	7.5 km Sprint	(Russia) Yana Romanova	(France) Marie-Laure Brunet	(Sweden) Helena Jonsson	(Germany) Magdalena Neuner	Detail
9	27 March 2010	(Russia) Khanty-Mansiysk	12.5 km Mass Start	(Germany) Magdalena Neuner	(France) Sandrine Bailly	(Slovakia) Anastázia Kuzminová	(Germany) Magdalena Neuner	Detail

=== Men's team ===
Event	Date	Place	Discipline	Winner	Second	Third
1	6 December 2009	(Sweden) Östersund	4x7.5 km Relay	France Vincent Jay; Vincent Defrasne; Simon Fourcade; Martin Fourcade	Norway Emil Hegle Svendsen; Alexander Os; Lars Berger; Ole Einar Bjørndalen	Austria Daniel Mesotitsch; Simon Eder; Dominik Landertinger; Christoph Sumann
2	13 December 2009	(Austria) Hochfilzen	4x7.5 km Relay	Austria Simon Eder; Daniel Mesotitsch; Dominik Landertinger; Christoph Sumann	Russia Ivan Tcherezov; Evgeny Ustyugov; Nikolay Kruglov; Maxim Tchoudov	Germany Christoph Stephan; Arnd Peiffer; Michael Greis; Simon Schempp
4	7 January 2010	(Germany) Oberhof	4x7.5 km Relay	Norway Halvard Hanevold; Tarjei Bø; Emil Hegle Svendsen; Ole Einar Bjørndalen	France Vincent Jay; Vincent Defrasne; Simon Fourcade; Martin Fourcade	Germany Christoph Stephan; Michael Greis; Arnd Peiffer; Simon Schempp
5	17 January 2010	(Germany) Ruhpolding	4x7.5 km Relay	Russia Ivan Tcherezov; Anton Shipulin; Maxim Tchoudov; Evgeny Ustyugov	Norway Halvard Hanevold; Tarjei Bø; Ole Einar Bjørndalen; Emil Hegle Svendsen	Austria Daniel Mesotitsch; Friedrich Pinter; Tobias Eberhard; Dominik Landertinger
OG	26 February 2010	(Canada) Vancouver	4x7.5 km Relay	Norway Halvard Hanevold; Tarjei Bø; Emil Hegle Svendsen; Ole Einar Bjørndalen	Austria Simon Eder; Daniel Mesotitsch; Dominik Landertinger; Christoph Sumann	Russia Ivan Tcherezov; Anton Shipulin; Maxim Tchoudov; Evgeny Ustyugov

=== Women's team ===
Event	Date	Place	Discipline	Winner	Second	Third
1	6 December 2009	(Sweden) Östersund	4x6 km Relay	Germany Martina Beck; Andrea Henkel; Simone Hauswald; Kati Wilhelm	Russia Svetlana Sleptsova; Anna Boulygina; Olga Zaitseva; Olga Medvedtseva	France Marie-Laure Brunet; Sylvie Becaert; Marie Dorin; Sandrine Bailly
2	13 December 2009	(Austria) Hochfilzen	4x6 km Relay	Russia Svetlana Sleptsova; Anna Boulygina; Yana Romanova; Olga Zaitseva	France Marie-Laure Brunet; Sylvie Becaert; Marie Dorin; Sandrine Bailly	Sweden Elisabeth Högberg; Anna Carin Zidek; Anna Maria Nilsson; Helena Jonsson
4	6 January 2010	(Germany) Oberhof	4x6 km Relay	Russia Anna Bogaliy-Titovets; Anna Boulygina; Olga Medvedtseva; Svetlana Sleptsova	Germany Martina Beck; Simone Hauswald; Tina Bachmann; Andrea Henkel	France Marie-Laure Brunet; Sylvie Becaert; Marie Dorin; Sandrine Bailly
5	15 January 2010	(Germany) Ruhpolding	4x6 km Relay	Sweden Elisabeth Högberg; Anna Carin Zidek; Anna Maria Nilsson; Helena Jonsson	Russia Yana Romanova; Anna Boulygina; Olga Medvedtseva; Olga Zaitseva	Norway Liv-Kjersti Eikeland; Ann Kristin Flatland; Solveig Rogstad; Tora Berger
OG	23 February 2010	(Canada) Vancouver	4x6 km Relay	Russia Svetlana Sleptsova; Anna Bogaliy-Titovets; Olga Medvedtseva; Olga Zaitseva	France Marie-Laure Brunet; Sylvie Becaert; Marie Dorin; Sandrine Bailly	Germany Kati Wilhelm; Simone Hauswald; Martina Beck; Andrea Henkel

=== Mixed ===
Event	Date	Place	Discipline	Winner	Second	Third
7	12 March 2010	(Finland) Kontiolahti	2x6 km + 2x7.5 km Mixed Relay	Norway Ann Kristin Flatland; Tora Berger; Halvard Hanevold; Tarjei Bø	Germany Kati Wilhelm; Magdalena Neuner; Erik Lesser; Simon Schempp	Italy Katja Haller; Karin Oberhofer; Lukas Hofer; Christian De Lorenzi
9 (WC)	28 March 2010	(Russia) Khanty-Mansiysk	2x6 km + 2x7.5 km Mixed Relay	Germany Simone Hauswald; Magdalena Neuner; Simon Schempp; Arnd Peiffer	Norway Ann Kristin Flatland; Tora Berger; Emil Hegle Svendsen; Ole Einar Bjørndalen	Sweden Helena Jonsson; Anna Carin Zidek; Björn Ferry; Carl Johan Bergman

== Standings: Men ==
=== Overall ===
Pos.		Points
1.	(Norway) Emil Hegle Svendsen	828
2.	(Austria) Christoph Sumann	813
3.	(Russia) Ivan Tcherezov	782
4.	(Russia) Evgeny Ustyugov	752
5.	(France) Martin Fourcade	719

- Final standings after 25 races.

=== Individual ===
Pos.		Points
1.	(Austria) Christoph Sumann	142
2.	(Norway) Emil Hegle Svendsen	120
3.	(Austria) Daniel Mesotitsch	120
4.	(Ukraine) Serhiy Sednev	114
5.	(Slovakia) Pavol Hurajt	111

- Final standings after 4 races.

=== Sprint ===
Pos.		Points
1.	(Norway) Emil Hegle Svendsen	354
2.	(Russia) Ivan Tcherezov	344
3.	(Austria) Christoph Sumann	292
4.	(Russia) Evgeny Ustyugov	278
5.	(Austria) Dominik Landertinger	272

- Final standings after 10 races.

=== Pursuit ===
Pos.		Points
1.	(France) Martin Fourcade	197
2.	(Austria) Simon Eder	196
3.	(Russia) Ivan Tcherezov	189
4.	(Russia) Evgeny Ustyugov	184
5.	(Austria) Dominik Landertinger	184

- Final standings after 6 races.

=== Mass start ===
Pos.		Points
1.	(Russia) Evgeny Ustyugov	197
2.	(Norway) Emil Hegle Svendsen	163
3.	(Germany) Arnd Peiffer	161
4.	(Austria) Christoph Sumann	160
5.	(Austria) Dominik Landertinger	157

- Final standings after 5 races.

=== Relay ===
Pos.		Points
1.	Norway	228
2.	Austria	210
3.	Russia	205
4.	France	195
5.	Germany	179

- Final standings after 5 races.

=== Nation ===
Pos.		Points
1.	Norway	6250
2.	Russia	6161
3.	Austria	6107
4.	France	5846
5.	Germany	5760

- Final standings after 19 races.

== Standings: Women ==
=== Overall ===
Pos.		Points
1.	(Germany) Magdalena Neuner	933
2.	(Germany) Simone Hauswald	857
3.	(Sweden) Helena Jonsson	820
4.	(Germany) Andrea Henkel	786
5.	(Sweden) Anna Carin Zidek	778

- Final standings after 25 races.

=== Individual ===
Pos.		Points
1.	(Sweden) Anna Carin Zidek	132
2.	(Germany) Andrea Henkel	126
3.	(Germany) Kati Wilhelm	121
4.	(Belarus) Darya Domracheva	121
5.	(Sweden) Helena Jonsson	120

- Final standings after 4 races.

=== Sprint ===
Pos.		Points
1.	(Germany) Simone Hauswald	346
2.	(Germany) Magdalena Neuner	334
3.	(Sweden) Helena Jonsson	334
4.	(Sweden) Anna Carin Zidek	327
5.	(Germany) Kati Wilhelm	303

- Final standings after 10 races.

=== Pursuit ===
Pos.		Points
1.	(Germany) Magdalena Neuner	256
2.	(Germany) Simone Hauswald	217
3.	(Russia) Olga Zaitseva	207
4.	(Belarus) Darya Domracheva	200
5.	(Germany) Andrea Henkel	195

- Final standings after 6 races.

=== Mass start ===
Pos.		Points
1.	(Germany) Magdalena Neuner	216
2.	(Germany) Simone Hauswald	198
3.	(Germany) Andrea Henkel	171
4.	(Sweden) Helena Jonsson	168
5.	(Russia) Olga Zaitseva	154

- Final standings after 5 races.

=== Relay ===
Pos.		Points
1.	Russia	234
2.	Germany	205
3.	France	204
4.	Sweden	191
5.	Norway	165

- Final standings after 5 races.

=== Nation ===
Pos.		Points
1.	Germany	6309
2.	Russia	6290
3.	France	5834
4.	Sweden	5829
5.	Ukraine	5456

- Final standings after 19 races.

== Medal table ==
(includes medals of the Olympic Winter Games Vancouver 2010)

Rank	Nation	Gold	Silver	Bronze	Total
1	Germany	14	13	13	40
2	Russia	14	12	6	32
3	Norway	13	8	8	29
4	Sweden	8	5	6	19
5	France	5	7	9	21
6	Austria	4	7	7	18
7	Belarus	2	3	2	7
8	Slovakia	1	1	3	5
9	Ukraine	1	1	1	3
10	Italy	0	2	1	3
10	United States	0	2	1	3
12	Estonia	0	1	0	1
12	Kazakhstan	0	1	0	1
14	Croatia	0	0	1	1
14	Finland	0	0	1	1
14	Poland	0	0	1	1
14	Switzerland	0	0	1	1
Totals (17 entries)		62	63	61	186

== Achievements ==
First World Cup career victory

- Evgeny Ustyugov (RUS), 24, in his 2nd season — the WC 3 Pursuit in Pokljuka; first podium was 2009–10 Sprint in Hochfilzen
- Serhiy Sednev (UKR), 26, in his 7th season — the WC 6 Individual in Antholz; first podium was 2007–08 Individual in Pokljuka
- Anastasiya Kuzmina (SVK), 25, in her 4th season — the 2010 Winter Olympics Sprint; first podium was 2009 World Championships Mass start in Pyeongchang
- Darya Domracheva (BLR), 23, in her 4th season — the WC 7 Sprint in Kontiolahti; first podium was 2008–09 Sprint in Ruhpolding
- Martin Fourcade (FRA), 21, in his 3rd season — the WC 7 Pursuit in Kontiolahti; first podium was 2010 Winter Olympics Mass start in Vancouver
- Yana Romanova (RUS), 26, in her 3rd season — the WC 9 Sprint in Khanty-Mansiysk; it also was her first podium

First World Cup podium

- Tim Burke (USA), 27, in his 7th season — no. 2 in the WC 1 Individual in Östersund
- Evgeny Ustyugov (RUS), 24, in his 2nd season — no. 3 in the WC 2 Sprint in Hochfilzen
- Thomas Frei (SUI), 29, in his 3rd season — no. 3 in the WC 3 Sprint in Pokljuka
- Roland Lessing (EST), 31, in his 12th season — no. 2 in the WC 3 Pursuit in Pokljuka
- Ann Kristin Flatland (NOR), 27, in her 7th season — no. 3 in the WC 4 Sprint in Oberhof
- Alexis Bœuf (FRA), 23, in his 3rd season — no. 3 in the WC 6 Individual in Antholz
- Elena Khrustaleva (KAZ), 29, in her 5th season — no. 2 in the 2010 Winter Olympics Individual
- Sergey Novikov (BLR), 29, in his 10th season — no. 2 in the 2010 Winter Olympics Individual
- Martin Fourcade (FRA), 21, in his 3rd season — no. 2 in the 2010 Winter Olympics Mass start
- Christian De Lorenzi (ITA), 29, in his 7th season — no. 2 in the WC 7 Pursuit in Kontiolahti
- Simon Schempp (GER), 21, in his 2nd season — no. 2 in the WC 8 Pursuit in Oslo
- Yana Romanova (RUS), 26, in her 3rd season — no. 1 in the WC 9 Sprint in Khanty-Mansiysk

Victory in this World Cup (all-time number of victories in parentheses)

Men

- Emil Hegle Svendsen (NOR), 5 (16) first places
- Ivan Tcherezov (RUS), 4 (7) first places
- Ole Einar Bjørndalen (NOR), 3 (91) first places
- Evgeny Ustyugov (RUS), 3 (3) first places
- Martin Fourcade (FRA), 3 (3) first places
- Christoph Sumann (AUT), 1 (5) first place
- Björn Ferry (SWE), 1 (3) first place
- Arnd Peiffer (GER), 1 (2) first place
- Daniel Mesotitsch (AUT), 1 (2) first place
- Vincent Jay (FRA), 1 (2) first place
- Dominik Landertinger (AUT), 1 (2) first place
- Serhiy Sednev (UKR), 1 (1) first place

Women

- Magdalena Neuner (GER), 5 (19) first places
- Helena Jonsson (SWE), 4 (9) first places
- Simone Hauswald (GER), 4 (7) first places
- Andrea Henkel (GER), 2 (18) first places
- Anna Carin Olofsson-Zidek (SWE), 2 (11) first places
- Svetlana Sleptsova (RUS), 2 (6) first places
- Tora Berger (NOR), 2 (6) first places
- Darya Domracheva (BLR), 2 (2) first places
- Anastasiya Kuzmina (SVK), 1 (1) first place
- Yana Romanova (RUS), 1 (1) first place

== Retirements ==
Following notable biathletes announced their retirement during or after the 2009–10 season:

- Mikhail Siamionau (BLR)
- Robin Clegg (CAN)
- Roman Dostál (CZE)
- Martten Kaldvee (EST)
- Vincent Defrasne (FRA)
- Halvard Hanevold (NOR)
- Nikolay Kruglov (RUS)
- Marek Matiaško (SVK)
- Vyacheslav Derkach (UKR)
- Liudmila Ananko (BLR)
- Olga Kudrashova (BLR)
- Natalya Sokolova (BLR)
- Sandra Keith (CAN)
- Dong Xue (CHN)
- Liu Xianying (CHN)
- Kong Yingchao (CHN)
- Yu Shumei (CHN)
- Magda Rezlerova (CZE)
- Sandrine Bailly (FRA)
- Sylvie Becaert (FRA)
- Martina Beck (GER)
- Simone Hauswald (GER)
- Anne Preussler (GER)
- Kati Wilhelm (GER)
- Barbara Ertl (ITA)
- Natalia Levchenkova (MDA)
- Liv Kjersti Eikeland (NOR)
- Anne Ingstadbjoerg (NOR)
- Gro Marit Istad-Kristiansen (NOR)
- Dana Plotogea (ROM)
- Mihaela Purdea (ROM)
- Olga Medvedtseva (RUS)
- Dijana Ravnikar (SLO)(comeback in 2012/2013 season)
- Lilia Vaygina-Efremova (UKR)
- Oksana Yakovleva (UKR)

== Notes ==
- Yellow mark means the leader in the overall standings, one will wear the yellow jersey in the next World Cup race. Red mark means the leader in the discipline, one will wear the red jersey during the next World Cup race in the discipline, unless the athlete is at the same time the leader in the overall standings, in which case one will wear combined yellow/read jersey.
