= 2009–10 Biathlon World Cup – World Cup 2 =

Coordinates: 47°28′N 12°37′E

The 2009–10 Biathlon World Cup - World Cup 2 is the second event of the season and was held in Hochfilzen, Austria from Friday December 11 until Sunday December 13, 2009.

== Schedule of events ==
The schedule of the event is below

Date	Time	Events
December 11	11:15 CET	Women's 7.5 km Sprint
December 11	14:15 CET	Men's 10 km Sprint
December 12	12:00 CET	Women's 10 km Pursuit
December 12	14:15 CET	Men's 12.5 km Pursuit
December 13	11:00 CET	Women's 4 x 6 km Relay
December 13	14:15 CET	Men's 4 x 7.5 km Relay

== Medal winners ==
=== Men ===
Event:	Gold:	Time	Silver:	Time	Bronze:	Time
10 km Sprint details	Ole Einar Bjørndalen; Norway	26:14.0 (0+0)	Nikolay Kruglov, Jr. Russia	26:20.7 (0+0)	Evgeny Ustyugov; Russia	26:24.1 (0+1)
12.5 km Pursuit details	Emil Hegle Svendsen; Norway	34:36.7 (0+0+0+1)	Simon Eder; Austria	34:38.3 (0+1+0+0)	Ole Einar Bjørndalen; Norway	34:39.8 (0+1+2+0)
4 x 7.5 km Relay details	Austria; Simon Eder; Daniel Mesotitsch; Dominik Landertinger; Christoph Sumann	1:16:13.1 (0+0) (0+0) (0+0) (0+1) (0+0) (0+1) (0+3) (0+1)	Russia; Ivan Tcherezov; Evgeny Ustyugov; Nikolay Kruglov, Jr. Maxim Tchoudov	1:16:38.8 (0+1) (0+0) (0+0) (0+0) (0+0) (1+3) (0+0) (0+1)	Germany; Christoph Stephan; Arnd Peiffer; Michael Greis; Simon Schempp	1:16:45.1 (0+0) (0+1) (0+0) (0+0) (0+2) (0+1) (0+0) (0+1)

=== Women ===
Event:	Gold:	Time	Silver:	Time	Bronze:	Time
7.5 km Sprint details	Anna Carin Olofsson-Zidek; Sweden	23:10.8 (0+0)	Helena Jonsson; Sweden	23:21.9 (0+0)	Olga Zaitseva; Russia	24:00.5 (0+1)
10 km Pursuit details	Helena Jonsson; Sweden	34:09.1 (0+1+0+0)	Svetlana Sleptsova; Russia	34:40.8 (0+0+1+1)	Olga Zaitseva; Russia	34:45.1 (1+1+0+0)
4 x 6 km Relay details	Russia; Svetlana Sleptsova; Anna Boulygina; Iana Romanova; Olga Zaitseva	1:13:37.0 (0+1) (0+2) (0+1) (0+0) (0+0) (0+1) (0+1) (0+0)	France; Marie-Laure Brunet; Sylvie Becaert; Marie Dorin; Sandrine Bailly	1:13:40.8 (0+0) (0+2) (0+0) (0+1) (0+1) (0+0) (0+1) (0+2)	Sweden; Elisabeth Högberg; Anna Carin Olofsson-Zidek; Anna Maria Nilsson; Helena Jonsson	1:13:41.6 (0+0) (0+0) (0+0) (0+1) (0+2) (0+0) (0+0) (0+0)

== Achievements ==
Best performance for all time

- Evgeny Ustyugov (RUS), 3 place in Sprint
- Victor Vasilyev (RUS), 18 place in Sprint
- Michail Kletcherov (BUL), 34 place in Sprint
- Yan Savitskiy (KAZ), 39 place in Sprint
- Jaime Robb (CAN), 41 place in Sprint
- Vasja Rupnik (SLO), 42 place in Sprint
- Michael Hauser (AUT), 53 place in Sprint and 51 place in Pursuit
- Mikhail Siamionau (BLR), 68 place in Sprint
- Martin Otcenas (SVK), 82 place in Sprint
- Andrejs Rastorgujevs (LAT), 95 in Sprint
- Lukas Hofer (ITA), 15 place in Pursuit
- Nadezhda Skardino (BLR), 12 place in Sprint and Pursuit
- Liudmila Kalinchik (BLR), 13 place in Sprint and Pursuit
- Marina Lebedeva (KAZ), 41 place in Sprint
- Emilia Yordanova (BUL), 53 place in Sprint and 51 place in Pursuit
- Sirli Hanni (EST), 54 place in Sprint and 52 place in Pursuit
- Lyubov Filimonova (KAZ), 69 place in Sprint
- Romana Schrempf (AUT), 88 place in Sprint
- Elisabeth Juudas (EST), 95 place in Sprint
- Kristel Viigipuu (EST), 108 place in Sprint
- Natalya Burdyga (RUS), 27 place in Pursuit

First World Cup race

- Michela Andreola (ITA), 97 place in Sprint
- Gabriela Soukalová (CZE), 99 place in Sprint
- Reka Ferencz (ROU), 113 place in Sprint
- Laura Toivanen (FIN), 114 place in Sprint
