= 2009–10 Biathlon World Cup – World Cup 6 =

Coordinates: 46°47′N 12°03′E

The 2009–10 Biathlon World Cup – World Cup 6 was the sixth event of the season and was held in Antholz, Italy from Wednesday, January 20 until Sunday, January 24, 2010.

== Schedule of events ==
The schedule of the event is below

Date	Time	Events
January 20	14:15 cet	Women's 15 km Individual
January 21	14:15 cet	Men's 20 km Individual
January 22	14:15 cet	Women's 7.5 km Sprint
January 23	14:15 cet	Men's 10 km Sprint
January 24	12:50 cet	Women's 10 km Pursuit
January 24	15:15 cet	Men's 12.5 km Pursuit

== Medal winners ==
=== Men ===
Event:	Gold:	Time	Silver:	Time	Bronze:	Time
20 km Individual details	Serguei Sednev; Ukraine	54:06.7 (0+0+0+0)	Daniel Mesotitsch; Austria	54:51.6 (0+1+0+1)	Alexis Bœuf; France	55:01.0 (0+1+0+0)
10 km Sprint details	Arnd Peiffer; Germany	24:27.4 (0+0)	Dominik Landertinger; Austria	24:33.4 (0+1)	Christoph Stephan; Germany	24:42.5 (0+0)
12.5 km Pursuit details	Daniel Mesotitsch; Austria	31:50.4 (0+0+0+1)	Arnd Peiffer; Germany	31:52.1 (0+1+0+0)	Dominik Landertinger; Austria	32:10.1 (1+1+1+0)

=== Women ===
Event:	Gold:	Time	Silver:	Time	Bronze:	Time
15 km Individual details	Magdalena Neuner; Germany	43:14.4 (0+1+1+1)	Kati Wilhelm; Germany	43:19.9 (0+0+1+0)	Andrea Henkel; Germany	43:41.8 (0+0+0+2)
7.5 km Sprint details	Magdalena Neuner; Germany	20:19.7 (0+1)	Andrea Henkel; Germany	20:32.9 (0+0)	Sandrine Bailly; France	20:48.3 (0+0)
10 km Pursuit details	Andrea Henkel; Germany	30:59.8 (1+0+0+0)	Magdalena Neuner; Germany	31:23.1 (1+0+2+1)	Ann Kristin Flatland; Norway	31:44.7 (1+0+0+0)

== Achievements ==
Best performance for all time

- Serguei Sednev (UKR), 1 place in Individual
- Alexis Bœuf (FRA), 3 place in Individual
- Jaroslav Soukup (CZE), 4 place in Individual
- Peter Dokl (SLO), 11 place in Individual
- Brendan Green (CAN), 19 place in Individual and 14 place in Pursuit
- Lukasz Szczurek (POL), 28 place in Individual
- Kauri Koiv (EST), 30 place in Individual
- Thorsten Langer (BEL), 64 place in Individual
- Wynn Roberts (USA), 77 place in Individual
- Milanko Petrovic (SRB), 81 place in Individual
- Anton Shipulin (RUS), 4 place in Sprint
- Serhiy Semenov (UKR), 13 place in Sprint
- Marc-André Bédard (CAN), 20 place in Sprint
- Dušan Šimočko (SVK), 23 place in Sprint
- Vitali Tsvetau (BLR), 43 place in Sprint and 36 place in Pursuit
- Martin Mesotitsch (AUT), 59 place in Sprint and 56 place in Pursuit
- Tobias Arwidson (SWE), 62 place in Sprint
- Satoru Abe (JPN), 72 place in Sprint
- Martin Fourcade (FRA), 4 place in Pursuit
- Mattia Cola (ITA), 26 place in Pursuit
- Selina Gasparin (SUI), 5 place in Individual
- Karin Oberhofer (ITA), 18 place in Individual
- Rosanna Crawford (CAN), 56 place in Individual
- Adele Walker (GBR), 61 place in Individual
- Kim Mi-Seon (KOR), 71 place in Individual
- Elin Mattson (SWE), 78 place in Individual and Sprint
- Ramona Dueringer (AUT), 82 place in Individual and 77 place in Sprint
- Amanda Lightfoot (GBR), 85 place in Individual
- Elisabeth Juudas (EST), 87 place in Individual
- Agnieszka Cyl (POL), 12 place in Sprint
- Anais Bescond (FRA), 21 place in Sprint and 15 place in Pursuit
- Tanja Karisik (BIH), 88 place in Sprint
- Anna Lebedeva (KAZ), 19 place in Pursuit

First World Cup race

- Vladimir Chepelin (BLR), 25 place in Individual
- Vitali Tsvetau (BLR), 60 place in Individual
- Martin Mesotitsch (AUT), 63 place in Individual
- Tobias Arwidson (SWE), 70 place in Individual
- Yuryi Liadov (BLR), 71 place in Individual
- Zach Hall (USA), 85 place in Individual
- Pontus Olsson (SWE), 100 place in Individual
- Robert Chudley (GBR), 104 place in Individual
- Laure Soulie (AND), 37 place in Individual
- Darya Yurkevich (BLR), 62 place in Individual
- Melanie Schultz (CAN), 67place in Individual
