= 2009–10 Biathlon World Cup – World Cup 1 =

Coordinates: 63°11′N 14°38′E

The 2009–10 Biathlon World Cup - World Cup 1 was the opening event of the season and has been held in Östersund, Sweden, from 2 December until 6 December 2009

== Schedule of events ==
The time schedule of the event stands below

Date	Time	Events
December 2	17:10 cet	Women's 15 km Individual
December 3	17:10 cet	Men's 20 km Individual
December 5	11:30 cet	Women's 7.5 km Sprint
December 5	14:30 cet	Men's 10 km Sprint
December 6	11:00 cet	Men's 4 x 7.5 km Relay
December 6	14:00 cet	Women's 4 x 6 km Relay

== Medal winners ==
=== Men ===
Event:	Gold:	Time	Silver:	Time	Bronze:	Time
20 km Individual details	Emil Hegle Svendsen; Norway	52:43.7 (0+1+0+0)	Tim Burke; United States	53:19.2 (0+0+0+1)	Christoph Sumann; Austria	53:33.2 (0+0+0+1)
10 km Sprint details	Ole Einar Bjørndalen; Norway	23:30.1 (0+0)	Emil Hegle Svendsen; Norway	23:55.2 (0+1)	Tim Burke; United States	24:07.3 (0+0)
4 x 7.5 km Relay details	France; Vincent Jay; Vincent Defrasne; Simon Fourcade; Martin Fourcade	1:15:10.3 (0+1) (0+0) (0+0) (1+3) (0+0) (0+0) (0+2) (0+1)	Norway; Emil Hegle Svendsen; Alexander Os; Lars Berger; Ole Einar Bjørndalen	1:15:24.0 (0+1) (0+2) (0+1) (1+3) (0+0) (2+3) (0+0) (0+1)	Austria; Daniel Mesotitsch; Simon Eder; Dominik Landertinger; Christoph Sumann	1:15:28.5 (0+0) (1+3) (0+0) (0+3) (0+0) (0+0) (0+0) (0+1)

=== Women ===
Event:	Gold:	Time	Silver:	Time	Bronze:	Time
15 km Individual details	Helena Jonsson; Sweden	43:01.4 (0+0+1+0)	Anna Carin Olofsson-Zidek; Sweden	43:27.6 (0+1+0+1)	Darya Domracheva; Belarus	44:17.8 (0+1+0+1)
7.5 km Sprint details	Tora Berger; Norway	21:21.5 (0+0)	Olga Medvedtseva; Russia	21:28.3 (0+0)	Kaisa Mäkäräinen; Finland	21:31.5 (0+0)
4 x 6 km Relay details	Germany; Martina Beck; Andrea Henkel; Simone Hauswald; Kati Wilhelm	1:10:52.5 (0+1) (0+1) (0+0) (0+2) (0+1) (0+1) (0+2) (0+1)	Russia; Svetlana Sleptsova; Anna Boulygina; Olga Zaitseva; Olga Medvedtseva	1:11:10.9 (0+2) (0+1) (0+0) (0+0) (0+0) (0+3) (0+2) (0+1)	France; Marie-Laure Brunet; Sylvie Becaert; Marie Dorin; Sandrine Bailly	1:12:17.7 (0+0) (0+2) (0+2) (0+1) (0+0) (0+1) (0+2) (0+2)

== Achievements ==
Best performance for all time

- Tim Burke (USA), 2 place in Individual
- Martin Fourcade (FRA), 7 place in Individual
- Anton Shipulin (RUS), 22 place in Individual
- Lukas Hofer (ITA), 20 place in Sprint
- Victor Vasilyev (RUS), 25 place in Sprint
- Michael Hauser (AUT), 82 place in Sprint
- Stefan Gavrila (ROU), 89 place in Sprint
- Joel Sloof (NED), 105 place in Sprint
- Thierry Langer (BEL), 106 place in Sprint
- Valj Semerenko (UKR), 5 place in Individual
- Juliane Doll (GER), 12 place in Individual
- Fuyuko Suzuki (JPN), 19 place in Individual
- Mihaela Purdea (ROU), 25 place in Individual
- Marina Lebedeva (KAZ), 48 place in Individual
- Song Chaoqing (CHN), 5 place in Sprint
- Olena Pidhrushna (UKR), 7 place in Sprint
- Agnieszka Cyl (POL), 14 place in Sprint
- Megan Imre (CAN), 41 place in Sprint
- Nina Karasevych (UKR), 43 place in Sprint
- Miriam Gössner (GER), 58 place in Sprint
- Emilia Yordanova (BUL), 63 place in Sprint
- Zanna Juskane (LAT), 88 place in Sprint

First World Cup race

- Kevin Patzoldt (USA), 69 place in Individual
- Łukasz Witek (POL), 93 place in Individual
- Michael Hauser (AUT), 96 place in Individual
- Stefan Gavrila (ROU), 121 place in Individual
- Thierry Langer (BEL), 125 place in Individual
- Joel Sloof (NED), 126 place in Individual
- Kleanthis Karamichas (GRE), 130 place in Individual
- Aleksei Volkov (RUS), 74 place in Sprint
- Mikhail Siamionau (BLR), 95 place in Sprint
- Miroslav Kenanov (BUL), 114 place in Sprint
- Mindaugas Kovoliūnas (LTU), 126 place in Sprint
- Rokas Suslavičius (LTU), 131 place in Sprint
- Andrejs Rastorgujevs (LAT), DSQ in Sprint
- Natalya Burdyga (RUS), 29 place in Individual
- Emelie Larsson (SWE), 61 place in Individual
- Fanny Welle-Strand Horn (NOR), 62 place in Individual
- Miriam Gössner (GER), 73 place in Individual
- Lyubov Filimonova (KAZ), 81 place in Individual
- Kerstin Muschet (AUT), 105 place in Individual
- Elisabeth Juudas (EST), 111 place in Individual
- Mariya Sadilova (RUS), 75 place in Sprint
- Niya Dimitrova (BUL), 82 place in Sprint
- Sarianna Repo (FIN), 89 place in Sprint
- Romana Schrempf (AUT), 95 place in Sprint
- Elin Mattson (SWE), 98 place in Sprint
- Ramona Düringer (AUT), 101 place in Sprint
- Kristel Viigipuu (EST), 108 place in Sprint
