= 2009–10 Biathlon World Cup – World Cup 7 =

The 2009–10 Biathlon World Cup – World Cup 7 was the seventh event of the season and was held in Kontiolahti, Finland from Friday, March 12 until Sunday, March 14, 2010.

== Schedule of events ==
The schedule of the event is below

Date	Time	Events
March 12	14:15 cet	Mixed Relay
March 13	10:30 cet	Women's 7.5 km Sprint
March 13	14:15 cet	Men's 10 km Sprint
March 14	10:30 cet	Women's 10 km Pursuit
March 14	13:00 cet	Men's 12.5 km Pursuit

== Medal winners ==
=== Men ===
Event:	Gold:	Time	Silver:	Time	Bronze:	Time
10 km Sprint details	Ivan Tcherezov; Russia	24:42.4 (0+0)	Emil Hegle Svendsen; Norway	24:49.2 (0+0)	Martin Fourcade; France	25:12.5 (1+1)
12.5 km Pursuit details	Martin Fourcade; France	32:35.1 (1+0+0+0)	Christian De Lorenzi; Italy	32:45.2 (0+0+0+1)	Vincent Jay; France	32:50.7 (0+0+0+0)

=== Women ===
Event:	Gold:	Time	Silver:	Time	Bronze:	Time
7.5 km Sprint details	Darya Domracheva; Belarus	21:17.5 (0+0)	Olga Zaitseva; Russia	21:25.9 (0+0)	Kati Wilhelm; Germany	21:31.0 (0+0)
10 km Pursuit details	Darya Domracheva; Belarus	31:32.6 (0+0+1+0)	Magdalena Neuner; Germany	31:44.7 (0+0+2+1)	Simone Hauswald; Germany	31:50.7 (0+0+0+1)

=== Mixed ===
Event:	Gold:	Time	Silver:	Time	Bronze:	Time
2 x 6 km + 2 x 7.5 km Relay details	Norway; Ann Kristin Flatland; Tora Berger; Halvard Hanevold; Tarjei Bø	1:14:55.0 (0+1) (1+3) (0+1) (0+0) (0+2) (0+1) (0+0) (0+0)	Germany; Kati Wilhelm; Magdalena Neuner; Erik Lesser; Simon Schempp	1:15:00.4 (0+2) (0+1) (0+1) (0+1) (0+1) (0+1) (0+0) (0+1)	Italy; Katja Haller; Karin Oberhofer; Lukas Hofer; Christian De Lorenzi	1:15:30.6 (0+3) (0+0) (0+1) (0+1) (0+2) (0+1) (0+0) (0+1)

== Achievements ==
Best performance for all time

- Aleksey Volkov (RUS), 9 place in Sprint
- Vasja Rupnik (SLO), 28 place in Sprint
- Vincent Porret (FRA), 42 place in Sprint
- Oleksandr Batiuk (UKR), 55 place in Sprint
- Leif Nordgren (USA), 65 place in Sprint
- Nathan Smith (CAN), 67 place in Sprint
- Mindaugas Kovoliunas (LTU), 99 place in Sprint
- Martin Fourcade (FRA), 1 place in Pursuit
- Christian De Lorenzi (ITA), 2 place in Pursuit
- Magnús Jónsson (SWE), 10 place in Pursuit
- Benjamin Weger (SUI), 18 place in Pursuit
- Darya Domracheva (BLR), 1 places in Sprint and Pursuit
- Valj Semerenko (UKR), 4 places in Sprint and Pursuit
- Ekaterina Yurlova (RUS), 15 place in Sprint
- Megan Imrie (CAN), 32 place in Sprint
- Barbora Tomesova (CZE), 37 place in Sprint
- Natália Prekopová (SVK), 59 place in Sprint and 56 place in Pursuit
- Sarianna Repo (FIN), 65 place in Sprint
- Amanda Lightfoot (GBR), 71 place in Sprint
- Elisabeth Juudas (EST), 76 place in Sprint
- Niya Dimitrova (BUL), 79 place in Sprint
- Aliona Sosunova (LTU), 81 place in Sprint
- Ala Talkach (BLR), 45 place in Pursuit

First World Cup race

- Erik Lesser (GER), 44 place in Sprint
- Kazuya Inomata (JPN), 89 place in Sprint
- Ahti Toivanen (FIN), 90 place in Sprint
- Orhangazi Civil (TUR), 108 place in Sprint
- Ahmet Ustuntas (TUR), 109 place in Sprint
- Ala Talkach (BLR), 54 place in Sprint
- Natsuko Abe (JPN), 64 place in Sprint
