= Martten Kaldvee =

Estonian biathlete (born 1986)

Martten Kaldvee (born April 30, 1986, in Tallinn) is a former Estonian biathlete. At the 2010 Winter Olympics in Vancouver, he finished 74th in the 10 km sprint and 81st in the 20 km individual.

Citing a lack of funds and support from the Estonian biathlon team, Kaldvee retired from the sport after the 2009–10 season.
