= 2009–10 Biathlon World Cup – World Cup 9 =

Coordinates: 59°56′N 10°17′E

The 2009–10 Biathlon World Cup – World Cup 9 was the ninth event of the season and was held in Khanty-Mansiysk, Russia from Thursday 25 until Sunday 28 March 2010.

== Schedule of events ==
The schedule of the event is below

Date	Time	Events
25 March	14:15 cet	Women's 7.5 km Sprint
26 March	14:15 cet	Men's 10 km Sprint
27 March	12:15 cet	Women's 12.5 km Mass Start
27 March	14:15 cet	Men's 15 km Mass Start
28 March	13:15 cet	Mixed Relay

== Medal winners ==
=== Men ===
Event:	Gold:	Time	Silver:	Time	Bronze:	Time
10 km Sprint details	Ivan Tcherezov; Russia	24:24.3 (0+0)	Christian De Lorenzi; Italy	24:38.1 (0+0)	Andriy Deryzemlya; Ukraine	24:41.0 (1+0)
15 km Mass Start details	Dominik Landertinger; Austria	38:19.8 (1+0+0+0)	Arnd Peiffer; Germany	38:23.4 (0+0+0+0)	Halvard Hanevold; Norway	38:31.0 (0+0+0+0)

=== Women ===
Event:	Gold:	Time	Silver:	Time	Bronze:	Time
7.5 km Sprint details	Iana Romanova; Russia	20:59.3 (0+0)	Marie Laure Brunet; France	21:10.2 (0+0)	Helena Jonsson; Sweden	21:14.8 (0+0)
12.5 km Mass Start details	Magdalena Neuner; Germany	36:20.0 (0+0+2+1)	Sandrine Bailly; France	36:37.2 (0+0+1+0)	Anastasiya Kuzmina; Slovakia	36:43.6 (0+0+0+1)

== Achievements ==
Best performance for all time

- Benjamin Weger (SUI), 17 place in Sprint
- Nathan Smith (CAN), 54 place in Sprint
- Martin Otcenas (SVK), 66 place in Sprint
- Ville Simola (FIN), 69 place in Sprint
- Iana Romanova (RUS), 1 place in Sprint
- Marie Laure Brunet (FRA), 2 place in Sprint
- Synnøve Solemdal (NOR), 17 place in Sprint
- Magdalena Nykiel (POL), 37 place in Sprint
- Niya Dimitrova (BUL), 66 place in Sprint
- Galina Golushko (KAZ), 67 place in Sprint

First World Cup race

- Danil Steptsenko (EST), 75 place in Sprint
- Sami Orpana (FIN), 79 place in Sprint
