= 2009–10 Biathlon World Cup – World Cup 5 =

Coordinates: 47°46′N 12°39′E

The 2009–10 Biathlon World Cup – World Cup 5 was the fifth event of the season and was held in Ruhpolding, Germany from Wednesday, January 13 until Sunday, January 17, 2010.

== Schedule of events ==
The schedule of the event is below

Date	Time	Events
January 13	17:20 cet	Women's 7.5 km Sprint
January 14	17:20 cet	Men's 10 km Sprint
January 15	17:20 cet	Women's 4 x 6 km Relay
January 16	15:15 cet	Men's 15 km Mass Start
January 16	17:10 cet	Women's 12.5 km Mass Start
January 17	15:15 cet	Men's 4 x 7.5 km Relay

== Medal winners ==
=== Men ===
Event:	Gold:	Time	Silver:	Time	Bronze:	Time
10 km Sprint details	Emil Hegle Svendsen; Norway	23:27.5 (0+0)	Ole Einar Bjørndalen; Norway	23:30.7 (0+0)	Michael Greis; Germany	24:01.0 (0+0)
15 km Mass Start details	Emil Hegle Svendsen; Norway	39:19.5 (0+0+0+0)	Evgeny Ustyugov; Russia	39:24.6 (0+0+0+1)	Simon Eder; Austria	39:29.4 (0+0+1+0)
4 x 7.5 km Relay details	Russia; Ivan Tcherezov; Anton Shipulin; Maxim Tchoudov; Evgeny Ustyugov	1:22:29.8 (0+0) (0+0) (0+0) (0+0) (0+0) (0+0) (0+1) (0+1)	Norway; Halvard Hanevold; Tarjei Bø; Ole Einar Bjørndalen; Emil Hegle Svendsen	1:22:58.4 (0+0) (0+0) (0+1) (0+0) (0+1) (0+3) (0+1) (0+0)	Austria; Daniel Mesotitsch; Friedrich Pinter; Tobias Eberhard; Dominik Landertinger	1:24:04.6 (0+0) (0+2) (0+0) (0+2) (0+0) (0+1) (0+1) (1+3)

=== Women ===
Event:	Gold:	Time	Silver:	Time	Bronze:	Time
7.5 km Sprint details	Anna Carin Olofsson-Zidek; Sweden	23:49.6 (0+0)	Olga Medvedtseva; Russia	24:19.4 (0+0)	Magdalena Neuner; Germany	24:30.2 (0+2)
4 x 6 km Relay details	Sweden; Elisabeth Högberg; Anna Carin Olofsson-Zidek; Anna Maria Nilsson; Helena Jonsson	1:17:31.5 (0+1) (0+2) (0+0) (0+1) (0+1) (0+1) (0+0) (0+1)	Russia; Iana Romanova; Anna Boulygina; Olga Medvedtseva; Olga Zaitseva	1:17:48.1 (0+0) (0+0) (0+3) (0+1) (0+1) (0+1) (0+2) (0+0)	Norway; Liv Kjersti Eikeland; Ann Kristin Flatland; Solveig Rogstad; Tora Berger	1:18:00.5 (0+0) (0+1) (0+2) (0+1) (0+0) (0+0) (0+0) (0+2)
12.5 km Mass Start details	Helena Jonsson; Sweden	40:58.7 (0+0+0+0)	Simone Hauswald; Germany	41:21.8 (0+1+1+0)	Magdalena Neuner; Germany	41:33.7 (1+1+1+2)

== Achievements ==
Best performance for all time

- Martin Fourcade (FRA), 6 place in Sprint and 5 place in Mass start
- Claudio Böckli (SUI), 16 place in Sprint
- Vitaliy Kilchytskyy (UKR), 61 place in Sprint
- Anais Bescond (FRA), 27 place in Sprint
- Lyudmyla Pysarenko (UKR), 38 place in Sprint
- Emilia Yordanova (BUL), 41 place in Sprint
- Gabriela Soukalová (CZE), 64 place in Sprint
- Kristel Viigipuu (EST), 98 place in Sprint

First World Cup race

- Benjamin Weger (SUI), 19 place in Sprint
- Artem Pryma (UKR), 41 place in Sprint
- Vitaliy Kozhushko (UKR), 101 place in Sprint
- Laure Bosc (FRA), 76 place in Sprint
- Rosanna Crawford (CAN), 77 place in Sprint
- Aliona Sosunova (LTU), 109 place in Sprint
