= 2009–10 Biathlon World Cup – World Cup 8 =

Coordinates: 62°46′N 29°51′E

The 2009–10 Biathlon World Cup – World Cup 8 was the eighth event of the season and was held in Oslo, Norway from Thursday, March 18 until Sunday, March 21, 2010.

== Schedule of events ==
The schedule of the event is below

Date	Time	Events
March 18	11:30 cet	Women's 7.5 km Sprint
March 18	14:15 cet	Men's 10 km Sprint
March 20	14:15 cet	Women's 10 km Pursuit
March 20	16:00 cet	Men's 12.5 km Pursuit
March 21	14:15 cet	Women's 12.5 km Mass Start
March 21	16:00 cet	Men's 15 km Mass Start

== Medal winners ==
=== Men ===
Event:	Gold:	Time	Silver:	Time	Bronze:	Time
10 km Sprint details	Martin Fourcade; France	26:08.1 (0+0)	Maxim Tchoudov; Russia	26:15.2 (0+0)	Christoph Sumann; Austria	26:17.5 (0+0)
12.5 km Pursuit details	Martin Fourcade; France	33:46.9 (1+0+1+1)	Simon Schempp; Germany	33:55.9 (0+0+0+0)	Ivan Tcherezov; Russia	34:13.1 (0+0+0+1)
15 km Mass Start details	Ivan Tcherezov; Russia	40:10.1 (0+0+0+0)	Christoph Sumann; Austria	40:36.4 (2+0+0+1)	Emil Hegle Svendsen; Norway	40:44.7 (0+1+0+1)

=== Women ===
Event:	Gold:	Time	Silver:	Time	Bronze:	Time
7.5 km Sprint details	Simone Hauswald; Germany	20:42.4 (0+0)	Darya Domracheva; Belarus	20:47.3 (0+0)	Anna Carin Olofsson-Zidek; Sweden	20:56.8 (0+0)
10 km Pursuit details	Simone Hauswald; Germany	32:05.5 (2+0+0+1)	Darya Domracheva; Belarus	32:10.9 (0+0+0+1)	Anna Carin Olofsson-Zidek; Sweden	32:45.3 (0+0+0+2)
12.5 km Mass Start details	Simone Hauswald; Germany	37:00.7 (1+1+0+0)	Vita Semerenko; Ukraine	37:15.4 (0+0+0+0)	Magdalena Neuner; Germany	37:22.9 (0+1+1+1)

== Achievements ==
Best performance for all time

- Aleksey Volkov (RUS), 4 place in Sprint
- Simon Schempp (GER), 9 place in Sprint and 2 place in Pursuit
- Kazuya Inomata (JPN), 35 place in Sprint and 31 place in Pursuit
- Leif Nordgren (USA), 62 place in Sprint
- Joel Sloof (NED), 91 place in Sprint
- Fredrik Lindström (SWE), 10 place in Pursuit
- Tanguy Roche (FRA), 36 place in Pursuit
- Liudmila Kalinchik (BLR), 5 place in Sprint
- Fanny Welle-Strand Horn (NOR), 51 place in Sprint and 48 place in Pursuit
- Gabriela Soukalová (CZE), 52 place in Sprint
- Jana Gereková (SVK), 28 place in Pursuit

First World Cup race

- Vit Janov (CZE), 52 place in Sprint
- Arnaud Langel (FRA), 56 place in Sprint
- Tanguy Roche (FRA), 59 place in Sprint
- Sami Orpana (FIN), 85 place in Sprint
- Vid Voncina (SLO), 96 place in Sprint
- Elisa Gasparin (SUI), 64 place in Sprint
- Annukka Siltakorpi (FIN), 78 place in Sprint
