= Thomas Frei (biathlete) =

Swiss biathlete (born 1980)

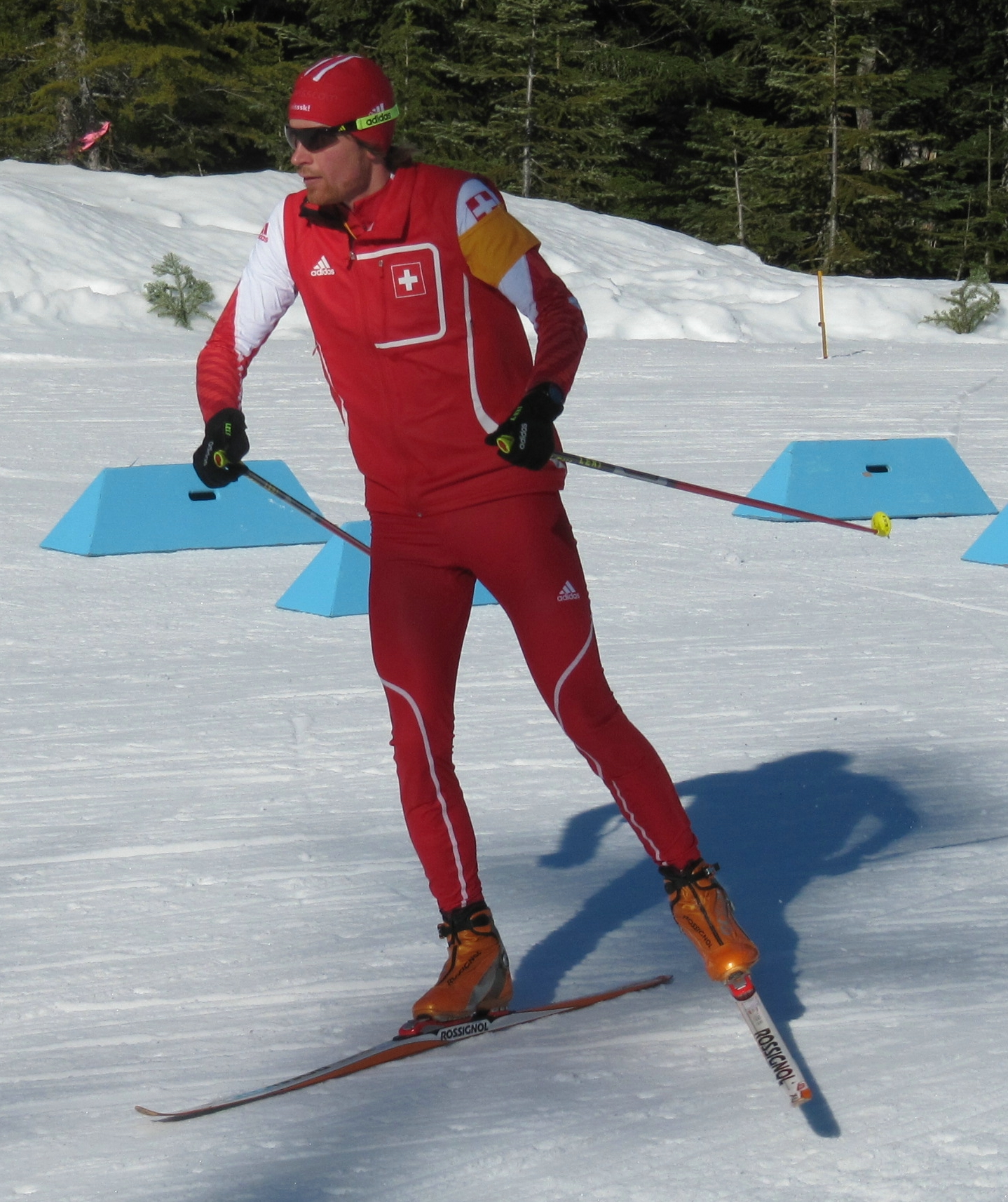

Personal information
- Full name: Thomas Frei
- Born: 17 April 1980 (age 46)

Sport
- Sport: Skiing

World Cup career
- Seasons: 2007/08–2010/11
- Indiv. podiums: 1
- Indiv. wins: 0
- Updated on 25 April 2011

Thomas Frei (born 17 April 1980) is a retired Swiss biathlete.
