= 2009–10 Biathlon World Cup – World Cup 4 =

World cup

Coordinates: 50°42′N 10°43′E

The 2009–10 Biathlon World Cup – World Cup 4 was the fourth event of the season and was held in Oberhof, Germany from Wednesday, January 6 until Sunday, January 10, 2010.

== Schedule of events ==
The schedule of the event is below

| Date | Time | Events |
|---|---|---|
| January 6 | 14:15 cet | Women's 4 x 6 km Relay |
| January 7 | 14:15 cet | Men's 4 x 7.5 km Relay |
| January 8 | 14:30 cet | Women's 7.5 km Sprint |
| January 9 | 12:45 cet | Men's 10 km Sprint |
| January 10 | 11:00 cet | Women's 12.5 km Mass Start |
| January 10 | 13:20 cet | Men's 15 km Mass Start |

== Medal winners ==
=== Men ===
| Event: | Gold: | Time | Silver: | Time | Bronze: | Time |
|---|---|---|---|---|---|---|
| 4 x 7.5 km Relay details | Norway; Halvard Hanevold; Tarjei Bø; Emil Hegle Svendsen; Ole Einar Bjørndalen | 1:17:03.3 (0+0) (0+0) (0+2) (0+2) (0+0) (0+2) (0+0) (0+1) | France; Vincent Jay; Vincent Defrasne; Simon Fourcade; Martin Fourcade | 1:17:30.8 (0+2) (0+2) (0+0) (0+3) (0+0) (0+0) (0+0) (0+0) | Germany; Christoph Stephan; Michael Greis; Arnd Peiffer; Simon Schempp | 1:17:45.5 (0+1) (0+2) (0+1) (0+3) (0+2) (0+0) (0+0) (0+0) |
| 10 km Sprint details | Evgeny Ustyugov; Russia | 28:45.0 (0+3) | Michael Greis; Germany | 28:47.8 (0+2) | Carl Johan Bergman; Sweden | 28:53.2 (0+0) |
| 15 km Mass Start details | Ole Einar Bjørndalen; Norway | 38:57.3 (0+1+0+0) | Tim Burke; United States | 40:00.2 (0+1+1+0) | Tomasz Sikora; Poland | 40:37.9 (0+0+1+2) |

=== Women ===
| Event: | Gold: | Time | Silver: | Time | Bronze: | Time |
|---|---|---|---|---|---|---|
| 4 x 6 km Relay details | Russia; Anna Bogaliy-Titovets; Anna Boulygina; Olga Medvedtseva; Svetlana Sleptsova | 1:14:23.6 (0+3) (0+2) (0+0) (0+0) (0+1) (0+0) (0+2) (0+0) | Germany; Martina Beck; Simone Hauswald; Tina Bachmann; Andrea Henkel | 1:14:23.9 (0+1) (0+2) (0+0) (0+3) (0+2) (0+3) (0+0) (0+0) | France; Marie-Laure Brunet; Sylvie Becaert; Marie Dorin; Sandrine Bailly | 1:15:24.5 (0+0) (0+0) (0+1) (0+3) (0+0) (0+1) (0+2) (0+1) |
| 7.5 km Sprint details | Simone Hauswald; Germany | 22:15.1 (0+1) | Helena Jonsson; Sweden | 22:23.8 (1+0) | Ann Kristin Flatland; Norway | 22:32.6 (0+1) |
| 12.5 km Mass Start details | Andrea Henkel; Germany | 40:53.6 (1+1+0+0) | Helena Jonsson; Sweden | 41:17.0 (0+1+0+1) | Tora Berger; Norway | 41:33.9 (0+0+0+2) |

== Achievements ==
Best performance for all time

- Martten Kaldvee (EST), 7 place in Sprint
- Serhiy Semenov (UKR), 16 place in Sprint
- Jean-Guillaume Béatrix (FRA), 17 place in Sprint
- Mikhail Siamionau (BLR), 31 place in Sprint
- Junji Nagai (JPN), 36 place in Sprint
- Oleksandr Batiuk (UKR), 67 place in Sprint
- Martin Otcenas (SVK), 75 place in Sprint
- Satoru Abe (JPN), 76 place in Sprint
- Andrejs Rastorgujevs (LAT), 82 in Sprint
- Tomas Kaukėnas (LTU), 94 in Sprint
- Mindaugas Kovoliunas (LTU), 102 in Sprint
- Ann Kristin Flatland (NOR), 3 place in Sprint
- Diana Rasimovičiūtė (LTU), 10 place in Sprint
- Ekaterina Yurlova (RUS), 28 place in Sprint
- Sarah Murphy (NZL), 45 place in Sprint
- Lyudmyla Pysarenko (UKR), 57 place in Sprint
- Jo In-Hee (KOR), 63 place in Sprint
- Zanna Juskane (LAT), 74 place in Sprint
- Alexandra Camenscic (MDA), 81 place in Sprint
- Sarianna Repo (FIN), 82 place in Sprint
- Kim Mi-Seon (KOR), 84 place in Sprint
- Amanda Lightfoot (GBR), 86 place in Sprint

First World Cup race

- Ted Armgren (SWE), 26 place in Sprint
- Priit Narusk (EST), 33 place in Sprint
- Tanja Karisik (BIH), 90 place in Sprint
