= Michael Hauser =

Czech philosopher

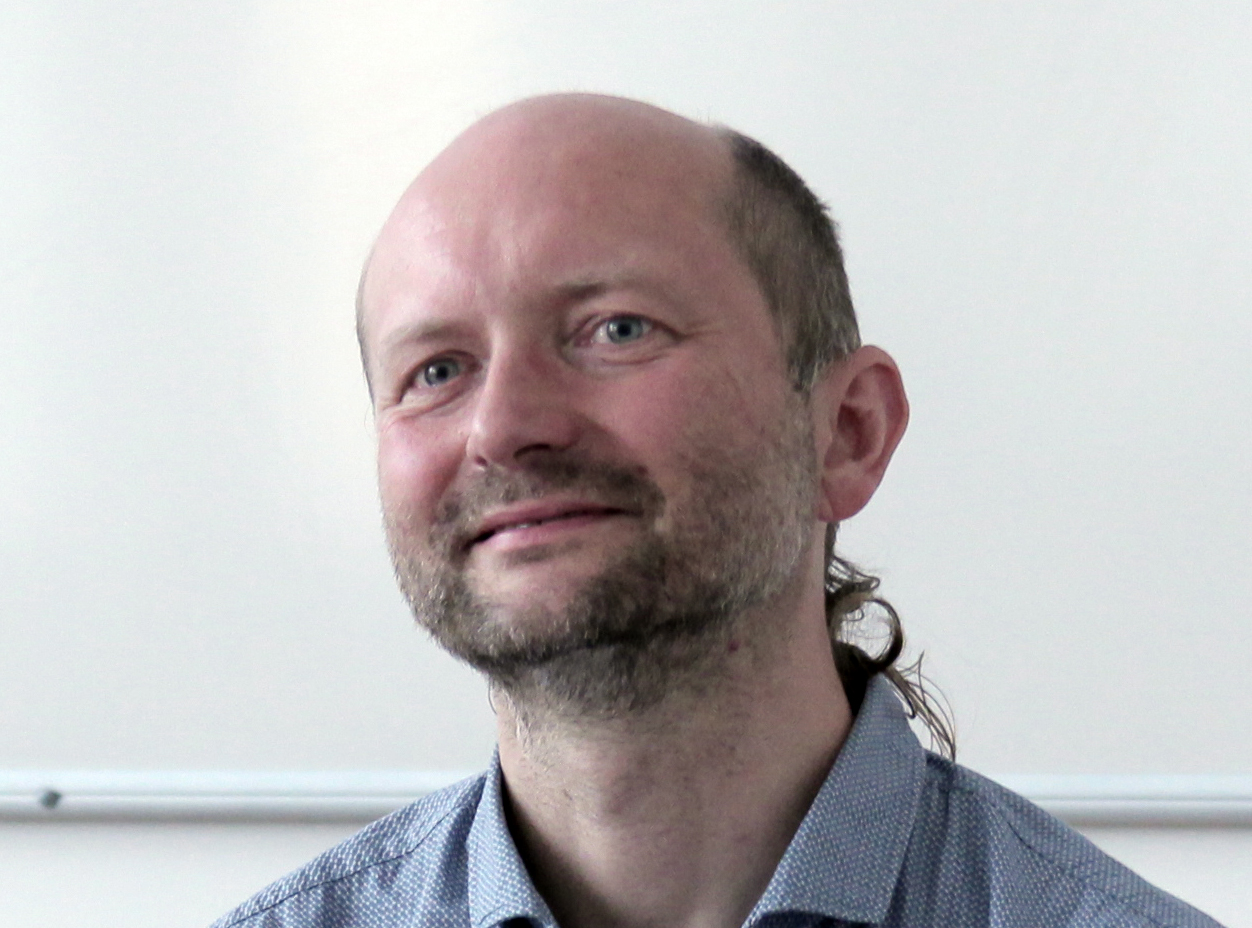
- Hauser in 2019
- Born: 30 March 1972 (age 54); Czech Republic
- Education: Faculty of Arts, Charles University
- Occupations: philosopher; educator; poet; translator
- Organization(s): Faculty of Education, Charles University Institute of Philosophy of the Czech Academy of Sciences
- Known for: Contemporary philosophy Political and social philosophy Emancipatory ideas
- Movement: Socialism

Michael Hauser (born 30 March 1972) is a Czech philosopher, educator, poet, and translator. He founded the educational association Socialist Circle, of which he was chairman until 2014 and has been a member of the leadership since 2020. He is a member of the Prague Axiomatic Circle. He is a member of the committee of the European Philosophy Festival. He focuses on transdisciplinary connections among social and political philosophy, ontology, cultural theory, and radical theology as a path to a comprehensive understanding of the present world and its possible directions. He also deals with the principles of a new socialist movement that will respond to the phenomenon of oligarchization and social and environmental crises. He draws primarily on the work of Theodor Adorno and other representatives of the Frankfurt School, Alain Badiou, Slavoj Žižek and the Czech critical philosophers Karel Kosík, Milan Machovec and others. He is the head of the Department of Civic Education and Philosophy at the Faculty of Education of Charles University. He researches at the Institute of Philosophy of the Czech Academy of Sciences in the Department of Contemporary Continental Philosophy. He was a member of the Czech Television Council in 2014-2020.

== Life ==
Influenced by his grandparents, CČSH pastors Naděžda Brázdilová and Jaroslav Brázdil, Hauser originally considered a spiritual path, first in the CČSH and, after his conversion to Catholicism, in the form of religious life. After high school, he entered the novitiate of the Jesuit order in 1990, but left after nine months and briefly studied at the Hussite Theological Faculty. He studied philosophy at the Faculty of Arts of Charles University and defended his doctoral thesis in 2004 (Modernity and Negativity: Adorno's Concept). In 2017, he habilitated at the Faculty of Education of Charles University.

He focuses on Critical Theory, Post-Marxism, and Czech critical thinking in relation to the crisis moments of contemporary civilization and nature, and seeks new solutions. He translated Slavoj Žižek's book The Ticklish Subject, Theodor Adorno and Max Horkheimer's book Dialectic of Enlightenment and other books. He publishes in Critical Horizons, Modern Theology, Distinktion, Filosofický časopis, Filozofie, and popularizes his research through numerous public appearances and in magazines such as Open Democracy, LeftEast, and Czech journals and webs Salon (literary supplement of Právo), A2, Alarm, Deník Referendum, Argument, and Kapitál.

In 2001, he founded the educational association Socialist Circle (SOK), which seeks to develop left-wing thinking and culture through contact between philosophers, historians, sociologists, economists, and artists. The association has organized dozens of workshops and conferences and has published many books by prominent left-wing philosophers and social scientists that were not published before or after November 1989 in the Czech Republic. On its website, the association has made available a large number of texts on various topics in the fields of philosophy, political theory, sociology, economics, and cultural studies. Many of Hauser's texts are available here, including excerpts from his books.

In 2007, on the anniversary of Charter 77, he initiated the appeal We Are Citizens!,

== Key concepts ==
=== The subject and death ===
People perceive various stimuli and experience their inner states. Most of the time, they are in the space of their immediate perceptions and ideas. According to Hauser, we can reach another space in which we look at ourselves from the perspective of the experience of death as a possible negation of our being or the beings close to us. This experience can be induced by entering a suicidal space. According to Hauser, this creates radical freedom, thanks to which a person gains distance from the given order of the world and from the characteristics and ideas that this order imposes on a person. The decisive factor is whether we perform an act in this space that defies death. This "antithanatical act" is the basis of the subject in Hauser's conception. We have an experience of death that transforms our lives.

Hauser's theory of the subject differs from Žižek's conception in that it includes not only the psychosomatic level of the human being, which is the subject of psychoanalysis, but also the physical or biological level, which Hauser refers to with the Greek word "sarx". (It appears in the New Testament, for example in the Gospel of John, where Jesus' physicality is understood in this way: "And the Word became flesh" (sarx), John 1:14). Hauser follows Walter Benjamin, who writes about the "suicidal heroic passion" caused by the blocking of essential human forces, which occurs in modern artists and the proletariat. He also refers to Karel Marx´s book On suicide. According to Hauser, the subject is connected to our physical corporeality "sarx," as he elaborates in his study on Althusser and Feuerbach.

Taking into account the physical body "sarx" in its evolutionary biological nature distinguishes Hauser's conception of the subject not only from Žižek's understanding, but also from other post-Marxist or cultural constructivist concepts, such as Judith Butler's. In this way, Hauser follows Adorno and Marx, according to whom human beings are shaped not only by culture and society, but also by their natural physical characteristics.

=== Responsive ideas and the path out of nihilism ===
Hauser's concept of ideas is closely related to his antithanatical concept of the subject. Hauser specifies that the antithanatical act is not a one-off event, but rather a repetitive one. Thanks to it, the experience of death or radical negativity is maintained in the subject. According to Hauser, this experience can be understood more broadly. It occurs when we experience the death of someone close to us or encounter other forms of death. We experience it by empathizing with the suffering of other people or animals, and also by imagining ourselves in extreme situations such as war, concentration camps, strenuous athletic performance, or states of deprivation, poverty, enslavement, or exile. We maintain an experiential state within ourselves that changes our relationship to ourselves, to other people, and to the world. According to Hauser, this also changes our relationship to ideas, art, politics, and other things. We look for answers to the experience of radical negativity in them and ask whether they form its opposite. This is the possibility of identifying with something positive, intense, and even infinite or eternal.

Hauser sees this identification with "ideas" as a response to the experience of radical negativity as a way out of postmodern nihilism. In contemporary art, there are many novels and other works that express the hopelessness, anxiety, and meaninglessness of human life, as in the novels of Michel Houellebecq, or that attempt to empathize with people and nature, but there are very few works that go further and take a particular idea, ethical principle, or vision seriously.

"It is a matter of turning the whole perspective around and rediscovering how poetry or art was able to respond to the passion evoked by the destructive Night of the World. Only in this way can a return to the heights be achieved in the postmodern landscape, heights that will not appear as a binding power, but as liberation." The term "Night of the World" comes from Žižek's book The Ticklish Subject.

Hauser does not reject postmodernism as such, as he shows that the postmodern experience of the disintegration of the world, things, and subjectivity creates space for the renewal of the relationship to ideas, art, and politics. His criticism of the postmodern subject is that it is not radical enough and has not completely emptied ideas of their content. In postmodernism, ideas survive as ghosts that the subject needs to deconstruct over and over again. According to Hauser, they must be allowed to die a second time and then be resurrected.

In his books, articles, and public activities, Hauser deals with how, in an age of skepticism and nihilism, to give new and vivid meaning to key concepts in philosophy, social sciences, pedagogy, politics, art, and theology. He expresses his approach by saying that it is necessary to deal with concepts that have a bad reputation but great potential. He develops his approach to these concepts primarily through the work of Alain Badiou. Hauser focuses on the following ideas or concepts: human being, subject, truth, work of art,democracy, socialism, communism, nation, infinity, God. He examines these concepts as part of a period of transition or interregnum.

=== The present era as an interregnum ===
Hauser first conceived of the present era as a time of transition in his book Paths from Postmodernism, in which he dealt with the crisis and possible end of postmodernism, neoliberalism, and liberal democracy. He formulated the idea of the weakening and end of postmodernism at the same time as several other cultural theorists. The collection of texts Supplanting the Postmodern was published three years after the release Paths from Postmodernism. Hauser has been critical of neoliberalism and capitalism since the beginning of his public career. His first socially oriented article, entitled "Democracy in the Shadow of Capitalism," was published in Salon, the literary supplement of Právo, on 13 April 2000.

In his book Kapitalismus jako zombie (Capitalism as Zombie), he put forward the thesis that "current economic, political, and social structures are internally fractured and beyond the control not only of the public but also of those in power." His approach is close to the theory of late capitalism, which he dealt with in connection with the collapse of the welfare state.

He also wrote about the crisis of liberal democracy at the beginning of the new millennium. He pointed to the gap between the ideal of liberal democracy and its socio-political reality and understood it as a sign of its decline.

Hauser then developed a comprehensive theory of the transition period, or interregnum. According to Antonio Gramsci: "the old is dying and the new cannot be born; in this interregnum a great variety of morbid symptoms appear".

Hauser presented this concept in his books Badiou's Ontology of the Present. Society, Economy and Culture in Transition and Metapopulist Democracy. Politics of Transition. He divides the interregnum into its prehistory, the first and second periods, and the upcoming third period. He focuses on three social dimensions: culture, politics, and the socio-economic level.

In Badiou's Ontology of the Present, he first focuses on the period that preceded the interregnum. He understands it, through Badiou's concepts, as a time when truth procedures were taking place and there was a notion that an emancipated classless society could be created. Artists participated in various ways in groundbreaking artistic events such as the emergence of Cubism or Abstract painting. Emancipatory politics was related in one way or another to the groundbreaking events of the Russian Revolution or other revolutions. Hauser focuses on the period in which these truth procedures are dying out. According to Badiou, the sequence of communist ideas came to an end in the late 1970s, when it became clear that nowhere had the transition from state socialism to an emancipated classless society been successful, and the hopes associated with the revolutionary stirring of May 1968 in France and with Chinese Culture Revolution had faded. In the book Revolutions for the Future. May'68 and the Prague Spring he emphasizes the significance of the Prague Spring, when society began to move towards new forms of politics and economics.

The first period of the interregnum is defined by the years 1989-2000/2008. This period is characterized by a certain euphoria and belief in the market system and liberal democracy. In the cultural sphere, people experienced a certain euphoria from postmodernism. Hauser shows that neoliberal thinking contained emancipatory promises and a certain utopian element, which was a reaction to emancipatory projects associated with the idea of communism.

Liberal democracy, and especially the idea of human rights, also contained elements of an emancipatory utopia, which had been transferred to them from the failed revolutionary visions of the twentieth century. In postmodernism, elements of modernist culture were at work, e.g., postmodern irony was sometimes linked to modernist euphoria about the new.

Hauser works with the concept of a sociocultural pattern (a certain way of thinking, perceiving, acting). Postmodern patterns include irony, skepticism towards grand narratives, radical multiplicity, blurring the boundaries between genres, and dispersing meaning. Modernist patterns include euphoria, grand narratives, changing the world, novelty, formal purity of genres, and concentration of meaning. Hauser uses an epicycloid to express the effect of modernist patterns on postmodern patterns. Postmodern patterns are in the center of the central circle, and modernist peripheral patterns orbit around its circumference.

In the cultural sphere, there is a desire for a different world and grand narratives, a desire for truth, empathy, seriousness, and universalism. Hauser builds on the concept of metamodernism formulated by Timotheus Vermeulen and Robin van den Akker. According to these cultural theorists, contemporary culture oscillates between postmodernism and modernism: between apathy and empathy, between skepticism and hope, between relativism and the desire for truth, between multiplicity and unity, between distrust of emancipatory projects and the desire for them.

Due to shortcomings of the concept of metamodernism (this concept does not take into account a similar oscillation in postmodernism itself), Hauser developed an elliptical model of contemporary culture. We have the following sequence:

expiration of peripheral patterns → mutation of core patterns → bifurcation (splitting) of core patterns

After their splitting, two poles emerge, e.g., relativism and the desire for truth. These two poles can be understood as two foci of an ellipse, on the circumference of which are individual cultural phenomena and formations.

Hauser considers that we are entering the third phase of the interregnum, which he calls the war interregnum. In it, interrelated crises (polycrisis) are likely to deepen and the two poles in the ellipse will become more pronounced. Conflict may arise between these poles and the ellipse itself will begin to split. This phenomenon can be observed, for example, in the conflictual political situation in the United States during Trump's second presidential term, when the conflict between the nationalist-populist or postmodern-fascist pole (Trump) and the liberal pole is coming to a head. Similar conflictuality also appears in international relations in connection with the formation of imperial blocs.

=== The crisis of liberal democracy and metapopulism ===
Hauser is often referred to as a political philosopher, but political philosophy is only one part of his work. He systematically explained his political philosophy in his book Metapopulist Democracy, which is based on his overall theory of interregnum. He considers liberal democracy to be a political and value system that fully established itself in the 1970s and 1980s. He refers to liberal democracy in the broad sense (parliamentary system, universal suffrage, expansion of civil and political rights) as constitutional democracy, which had various value and ideological orientations (imperial, national, conservative, socialist). He focuses on liberal democracy in a specific value sense, in which liberal human rights became the basic value/ideological orientation. This is not the only concept; Hauser mentions other concepts of human rights (conservative, socialist, decolonization, religious).

This value orientation emerged at a time when mass social movements were dying out and people had lost faith in the real possibility of emancipated society. An ideological vacuum appeared, which was filled by the idea of human rights. Hauser draws here on Samuel Moyn's book, The Last Utopia. Human Rights in History. He then understands liberal democracy as the political system of the first period of the interregnum, in which liberal principles (individual freedom) are core patterns, while collective identities (the people - demos, nation) are peripheral patterns, as shown by the epicycloid as a model of liberal democracy.

He argues that liberal democracy, like all other political systems, needs to be examined in a transdisciplinary manner and understood in its connection with culture and economics. He draws on his analyses of postmodernism and neoliberalism to demonstrate that liberal democracy is co-shaped by the culture of postmodernism (skepticism toward grand narratives) and neoliberal economics (the market as a spontaneous order that guarantees democracy). He illustrates the interrelationships between liberal democracy, postmodernism, and neoliberalism using the Borromean knot, which is a connection of three circles in such a way that none of them is directly connected to the other, but their connection depends on the third circle.

Hauser does not only deal with the transformation of liberal democracy, but also focuses on the very nature of metapopulism. Liberal democracy had the ability to maintain at least a minimum social consensus on human rights as a core value. However, society is breaking down into relatively closed blocks and communities of opinions and values, and the human rights consensus is disintegrating. According to Hauser, this raises a fundamental problem: how to find a minimum consensus in such a fragmented society that allows for effective state political decisions and governance itself? He therefore deals with the social ontology of a fragmented society and develops the concept of multitude (this term originally meant mass, crowd) in a new way. He understands it as an interconnected network of singularities (individuals) that is constantly changing internally. He introduces the neologisms multiunituda and unimultituda. The first term refers to a network of individuals and groups where multiplicity and fragmentation prevail over tendencies toward unification. Unimultitude refers to a network of singularities in which tendencies toward unification prevail over fragmentation.

This analysis of a fragmented society is the basis for understanding the current nature of governance. Ruling politicians look for a slogan or empty concept into which individual communities can project their own values. For example, Trump's slogan "Make America Great Again (MAGA)" was so vague and changeable that diverse communities understood it in their own way and accepted it. In this fluid way, Trump managed to unite a large part of American society. Vladimir Putin had already used this approach before. Hauser discussed the similarities between Trump and Putin in the article "Metapopulism in-between democracy and populism: transformations of Laclau's concept of populism with Trump and Putin"

In a fragmented society, politicians are forced not to give their slogans, speeches, and ideas ("representative values") a fixed meaning, i.e., a fixed essence. This would give them strong support in a certain community, but it would discourage other communities. They must therefore keep their slogans or values vague and fluid. Hauser calls these affective schemas or fluid essences. On this point, he disagrees with Andreas Reckwitz who argues in his book Society of Singularities that the values shared by members of neocomunities are fixed essences, and refers to empirical research showing that right-wing populist values and concepts are "floating signifiers."

=== The new socialist movement ===
Hauser seeks an alternative to metapopulism. It is not a return to liberal democracy in the specific sense of values, as this would also mean a return to neoliberal economics and postmodernism. In Metapopulist Democracy, he proposes a policy that focuses on people's existential basis, i.e., their existential dependence on work and their experience of precarity, exploitation, absurd rules, uncertainty, stress, and burn-out. Hauser argues that, empirically, most people are still dependent on their work as their source of livelihood. The working majority is divided into different professional strata and communities of opinion and values. It is important to create a link between existential experience and certain ideas and values ("liberation of work," "solidarity," "equality," "new society," etc.). These ideas and values then begin to appear as responses to a given life situation and cease to be mere schemas or empty slogans.

He presented its more concrete form in The Manifesto of the Socialist Movement. He reflects on what the interregnum means for the left. Left-wing strategies rooted in the twentieth century (mass workers' party; Keynesian welfare state) are dying out, and new effective strategies have not yet emerged. Hauser refers to Cédric Durand, who writes in his book Fictitious Capital that contemporary capitalism is oriented toward fictitious capital (property claims on future income, e.g., stocks or bonds). The dominance of fictitious capital leads to a decline in investment in the real economy and the depletion of public budgets.

It should be a movement that expresses the existential interests of the majority of people who are dependent on their work and are affected by the consequences of the environmental crisis or geopolitical conflicts. According to Hauser, the socialist movement cannot limit itself to economic issues, if only because workers and employees are often caught up in neoliberal ideology. They act as individuals who compete with each other to see who is more productive and allows themselves to be exploited more, as empirical research on factory workers shows.

Another topic is social equality between men and women, which has always been part of the socialist movement. Hauser emphasizes the importance of socialist feminism and criticizes liberal feminism, especially its extreme manifestations (biological sex itself is allegedly a socio-cultural construct). He takes the position that there are biologically determined sexes and many social and cultural forms and meanings (gender diversity).

Hauser published an article entitled "Manifesto as a Performative Experiment",in which he responds to critical reactions to the Manifesto of the Socialist Movement.

=== The Emancipatory Concept of Nation and Patriotism ===
Hauser addressed the question of the nation in a series of articles in which he gets rid of its bad reputation. He starts from the idea that the liberal elites and the postmodern left, which rejects everything national, do not lead to the expulsion of nationalism, but rather to its unintended strengthening. Despite media rhetoric about globalization, most people continue to have national or patriotic feelings, as empirical research shows.

He elaborates on this thesis in the article "Patočka's (and Pithart's) ideology of the Czech semi-periphery," where he analyzes Patočka's text "What are the Czechs?" in which Jan Patočka sees the Czechs as a qualitatively inferior nation compared to "master nations" such as the Germans, Dutch, and Russians. He also analyzes Petr Pithart's interpretation of modern Czech history, which he presented together with Petr Příhoda and Milan Otáhal (Podiven). The authors sympathize with interwar Germany, Hungary, and Austria and criticize Masaryk's Czechoslovakia, which they consider to be the work of an "immature nation" that wanted to preserve the Versailles system. Hauser considers these interpretations to be an intellectual justification of the position on the semi-periphery, where industry became an "assembly plant".

Hauser explained Masaryk's emancipatory concept of the nation through Badiou's "logic of worlds." The nation is a community related to a certain structure of elements (language, symbols, land...) that changes throughout history (the nation is not an immutable essence). Some symbols (Jan Hus, the Hussite chalice, the slogan "Veritas vincit" ("Truth prevails"), etc. reappear again and again in different times and with different meanings. In this sense, these elements are formally continuous, even though they exist in the discontinuities of historical epochs.

=== Hyperhumanism ===
Hauser draws on his theory of the subject and formulates a concept of hyperhumanism. Humans should not dissolve their specific human abilities in various networks and contexts, as posthumanists suggest, but rather enhance them in order to be able to take politically, socially, and morally demanding steps that will lead to systemic changes and avert impending environmental or other catastrophes. Hyperhumanism means that we focus on awakening and supporting specifically human qualities that are not found in artificial intelligence and other nonhuman systems (creativity; imagination; relationship to infinity; belonging to humanity, living beings and our planet; love; self-transformation...). Hauser proposes developing these qualities through Badiou's truth procedures, thanks to which a human being can be transformed from a human animal into a subject of truth that transcends a given social a cultural determinations. Hauser draws on his book Badiou's Ontology of the Present, in which he presents Badiou's concept of the infinite and the absolute. He then conceives of hyperhumanism as a transformation of the human being provoked by his relationship to the infinite and the absolute.

=== Marxist-Christian dialogue and radical theology ===
Hauser dealt with Marxist-Christian dialogue in Czechoslovakia and focused primarily on the work of Milan Machovec. Hauser relates this dialogue to the more general question of the relationship between emancipatory politics and Christianity. From Machovec's book A Marxist Looks at Jesus he derived a thesis on the complementarity of Christianity and emancipatory politics or Marxism. Christianity lacks its center, which is the unrealized coming of the kingdom of God, which was supposed to transform the earthly world, "to bring down the powerful from their thrones and lift up the lowly" (Luke 1:52) and satisfy "the thirst and hunger" for justice (Matthew 5:6). In its time, Marxism attempted to create a just society in which relations between people would be transformed in a way that, to a certain extent, would correspond to the parameters of the kingdom of God, regardless of Marxist atheism. However, Marxism lacked a higher reason for striving for socialism or communism. According to Machovec, it lacked the higher ideal of humanity that we find in Christianity. In this way, Christianity complements emancipatory politics (Marxism), and emancipatory politics (Marxism) complements Christianity.

Following on from the responsive conception of ideas and hyperhumanism, Hauser focused on the central theological concept of God and interpreted it through Badiou's concept of the great infinite or absolute. Badiou himself rejects the concept of God, arguing that it belongs to an ideology that does not allow for the existence of an autonomous infinity in our world. Hauser distinguished God as "the real" (that which escapes our knowledge and consciousness), which corresponds to Badiou's concept of truths, infinity, and the absolute. The concept of infinity is important, appearing in works of art, political events, scientific discoveries, and the love relationship between two beings. Infinity in art can be imagined in such a way that, for example, the Renaissance discovery of perspective can be applied in an infinite number of ways in many different paintings, artistic genres, technical fields, and in different eras, cultures, and civilizations. The same is true of the "infinity" of the ideas of freedom and equality embodied by the French Revolution. In this way, they contain the absolute, which Hauser proposes to conceive as God in the real mode, i.e., without a direct relationship to religious or spiritual experience. The absolute itself represents a large infinity or "ultra-infinity" that cannot be constructed. Its "size" cannot be determined and reached through mathematical operations with lower infinities.

Hauser thus distinguishes between the horizontal and vertical structures of the absolute/God. Christianity or other religions provide symbols and practices that enable us to maintain and develop our relationship with the absolute/God. There remains an unbridgeable gap between God in the form of religious symbolism (the statements of the Bible and the churches) and God as the real. Artistic, political, and other experiences or practices cannot be fully translated into religious experience, but at the same time, artistic and other experiences transform religious or spiritual experience and vice versa. In this way, according to Hauser, the concept of God expands to include phenomena that belong to the "secular" world, without disturbing that world. Works of art, emancipatory political events, scientific discoveries, and love between two people become part of God as infinities. Hauser sometimes speaks of the theology of the great God, which also includes what is not the subject of theology, but rather the subject of philosophy, political thought, scientific theory, art theory, and other disciplines. This concept remotely resembles Spinoza's understanding God as an infinity containing our world and human capacities as expressed in his book Ethics.

Hauser further developed this concept of God in a lecture at the international conference "Triertium Conference: A Trinitarian Synthesis of Wisdom" at the Faculty of Theology of Palacký University in Olomouc, attended by leading Trinitarian theologians (John Milbank, Emmanuel Gabellieri, Piero Coda, etc.).

=== The pedagogy of truths ===
Hauser began to focus more on pedagogical thinking. Like other philosophers of education, he points to the shortcomings and failures of established pedagogical models. He builds on the "critical pedagogy" founded by Paulo Freire, who sought to connect teaching topics with the real experiences of pupils and students in their social environment in order to transform their subjectivity so that they would begin to change their environment or our world. At the same time, it is based on "postcritical pedagogy," which sees the main shortcoming of contemporary education as being that, although it focuses on the needs of pupils and students, it mostly fails to awaken a deeper interest in and love for the subject being taught. He organized a lecture on post-critical pedagogy (Piotr Zamojski, Joris Vlieghe) at the Faculty of Education, Charles University, in 2024. Michael Victori and other philosophers of education develop what he calls the pedagogy of truths. According to Hauser, a particular subject taught should be linked to thought and experiential processes that can be understood as truth procedures in Badiou's sense. Michael Victory and other educational thinkers have discovered the educational potential of events such as encounters between pupils and students with beautiful music or breathtaking works of art. Teachers should create spaces and forms of sharing in which such encounters can take place. Victory uses the New Testament term ekklesia, which he understands as inspiration for the creation of educational communities that are open to anyone who is addressed by the event. Hauser follows up on Victory's ideas and turns his attention to the truth procedure and the concept of work. Hauser argues that only the truth procedure, in which we learn to name and develop an event, is an educational procedure. This includes not only the encounter with breathtaking art or a political event, but also the ability to develop this event faithfully and disciplinedly and to participate in the creation of a particular work. In this way, the pedagogy of truths is related to hyperhumanism.

=== Art and Poetry ===
Hauser's very first published article was devoted to contemporary Czech poetry. The article contains the seeds of some of the ideas and motifs that later developed into his theory of the interregnum. According to Hauser, Czech poetry in the 1990s had no need to write manifestos, as it existed in a postmodern world that differed from the conditions in which previous generations of poets had lived. However, there are signs and beginnings of poetic mimesis as a creative expression of the more general features of social and natural reality. Hauser does not understand mimesis as a mirroring or reflection of reality, but as a way of energizing poetic language through contact with reality.

In 2010, he continued with these themes in his article "Why Do We Need Engaged Poetry?" According to Hauser, engagement does not consist in a political or other stance, but is an expression of an encounter with the real world, with its traumatic places and contradictions. These can evoke a "materialistic enthusiasm" that actualizes a certain poetic word and condenses its meaning. This takes us out of the postmodern poetic mood, in which only different perspectives, emotional moments, and cultural references are mixed together.

This article is followed by Hauser's study "Mácha in the Postmodern Landscape." He focuses on the second act of the poem Máj (May) by Karel Hynek Mácha, in which Vilém delivers a monologue on the night before his execution, and interprets it as a space separated from society and its memory. In this "night of the world", the order of our world disappears and nothingness appears, in which the possibility of radical freedom is established. The emptiness of the universe, the ity of nature, and the things around us are revealed. In Hauser's interpretation, Vilém identifies with this emptiness and experiences real horror, which the postmodern subject is incapable of due to its protective ironic distance. Mácha's identification with nothingness evokes an energetic relationship of love for the things of this world. Hauser elaborates on František Xaver Šalda's observation that Mácha's nihilism awakens positive values: the will to truth, fearlessness, creative powers. In response to Martin Z. Pokorný's critical review "K.H. Mácha and His Journey to Nothingness and Adulthood," he cites an idea from Karel Teige's essay "The Revolutionary Romantic K.H. Mácha" that "in the repulsive lack of freedom of the capitalist century, in the disgusting stifling atmosphere of Austrian absolutism, Mácha's romantic revolt is an appeal for freedom and love, a call to fight against the 'wild rage of time'... it is the supreme act by which the poet becomes a poet and love becomes love."

In addition to Mácha's work, Hauser focuses on Dante, whom he interprets as a poet of the interregnum between the Middle Ages and the modern era. In Dante's characters in Hell, he identifies features that can be found in contemporary post-humanist art. Hauser also interprets Dante as a thinker of objective justice, which has been problematized in the modern and postmodern era.

In 2016, he participated in the creation of the "Manifesto of Radical Realism," which he formulated together with artists Vasil Artamonov, Dominik Forman, Alexey Klyuykov, and Avdey Ter-Oganian. The manifesto calls for the rehabilitation of media as an autonomous form and the establishment of a radical perspective on the future as a condition for intellectual and creative independence from the capitalist operation of art.

In his book Badiou's Ontology of the Present, Hauser placed radical realism in a broader cultural context and interpreted it as an overcoming of postmodernism. He compares it to remodernism and stuckism and argues that in a certain sense it goes further than these metamodern trends.

=== Poetic work ===
Hauser has published two collections of poetry to date. In his first collection, Katarze (Catharsis), he strives to free himself from the linguistic and contextual overload of contemporary poetry. In some poems, he has achieved a significant simplification and condensation of meaning. The poems refer to the turmoil of contemporary human existence and, in response, create a subtle clarity and visual dynamism. The poems aim to transform our scattered senses and purify our relationship to things.

God

I don't understand/I don't believe/and yet I need him/like first love/first ray of light/first breeze/wind storm

The collection is accompanied by drawings by the renowned Czech sculptor Jan Hendrych. At the launch of the collection, Hauser's verses were recited by actor Jiří Hromada.

The second collection is entitled Soudný den (Judgment Day). Hauser composed it along two axes. The first axis expresses the relationship between the cycle of birth and death and the fragile awareness of eternity and infinity. The second axis is temporal and runs through the annual cycle from the cold beginning, through spring, summer, autumn, and Advent, to the brightness of Judgment Day. Some poems create a calm, bright space, which is something exceptional in today's world of constant and often meaningless change (the poem "Chapel of the Holy Cross at Karlštejn"). In other poems, there is a compression of meaning and a transition to transcendence. This occurs, for example, in the polarity between physical deficiency and a simple object in which eternity is revealed.

Brother Francis and the Green Leaf

/.../ Barefoot on an icy pilgrimage/he caught a glimpse of a green leaf,/and all the poetry/since the creation of the world appeared to him/.../His fingers, emaciated to the point of tears,/clutched the poetry,/which no hand can grasp.

Hauser's poems were recited by Czech actress Tereza Hofová at the launch of the collection, and the evening was hosted by Czech actor Jiří Hromada.

=== Documentary films ===
Hauser appears in Helena Všetečková's documentary film Hauser and Žižek, Theorists of Post-Marxist Philosophy (2008). He appeared in Karel Vachek's film Communism and the Net, or The End of Representative Democracy (2019).

== Books ==
- Adorno: moderna a negativita (Adorno: Modernity and Negativity), Prague: Filosofia, 2005.
- Prolegomena k filosofii současnosti (Prolegomena to Contemporary Philosophy), Prague: Filosofia, 2007.
- Sociální stát a kapitalismus (Welfare State and Capitalism), Prague: Svoboda servis, 2007.
- Humanism Is Not Enough: Interview with Slavoj Žižek. International Journal of Žižek Studies, Vol. 3, No. 3 (2009), pp. 1–20. On-line
- Cesty z postmodernismu. Filosofická reflexe doby přechodu (Paths From Postmodernism. A Philosophical Reflection of Times of Transition), Prague: Filosofia, 2012.
- Kapitalismus jako zombie. Proč žijeme ve světě přízraků (Capitalism as Zombie. Why Do We Live in the World of Spectres), Prague: Rybka Publishers, 2012.
- Kopat do žuly motykou. Rozhovory s Michaelem Hauserem (Digging Granite with a Hoe: Conversations with Michael Hauser), Prague: Rybka Publishers, 2014.
- Katarze (Catharsis, poems). Prague: Novela bohemica, 2015.
- Revolutions for the Future. May'68 and the Prague Spring (Berankova, J.N., Hauser, M., Nesbitt, N. eds.), Lyon: Suture Press, 2020.
- Politika jednoty ve světě proměn (Feinberg, J.G., Hauser, M, Ort, J.) (Politics of Unity in the World of Change), Prague: Filosofia, 2021.
- Doba přechodu. Tranzitivní ontologie a dílo Alaina Badioua (Times of Transition. Transitory Ontology and the Work of Alain Badiou), Prague: Filosofia, 2021.
- Pražské jaro. Logika nového světa. Od reforem k revoluci (The Prague Spring. The Logics of a New World. From Reforms to a Revolution), Prague: Filosofia, 2022 (editor).
- Soudný den (Judgment Day, poems), Prague: Novela bohemica, 2022.
- Metapopulistická demokracie. Politika doby přechodu (Metapopulist Democracy. Politics in Times of Transition), Prague: Filosofia, 2024.
- Manifesto of the Socialist Movement. Transform! Europe 2025.
- Výchova a vzdělávání v době interregna (ed.) (Education in the Interregnum), Praha: Vydavatelství Pedagogické fakulty UK 2025.
- Badiou´s Ontology of the Present. Society, Economy and Culture in Transitin. Bloomsbury, London-New York 2025.

== Major translations ==
- Fromm, E.: Marx's Concept of Man (Czech: Obraz člověka u Marxe), Luboš Marek, Brno 2004.
- Fabre, C.: Social Rights Under the Constitution: Government and the Decent Life (Czech: Ústavní zakotvení sociálních práv), Filosofia, Prague 2004.
- Žižek, S.: The Ticklish Subject: The Absent Centre of Political Ontology (Czech: Nepolapitelný subjekt. Chybějící střed politické ontologie), Brno: Luboš Marek 2007.
- Adorno, Th. W. – Horkheimer, M.: Dialektik der Aufklärung (Czech: Dialektika osvícenství) (with M. Váňa), Oikomenyh, Prague 2009.
- Adorno, T., Horkheimer, M.: Das Schema der Massenkultur, Kulturindustrie (Schéma masové kultury), Oikomenyh, Prague 2009.
