= Emilia Yordanova =

Bulgarian biathlete

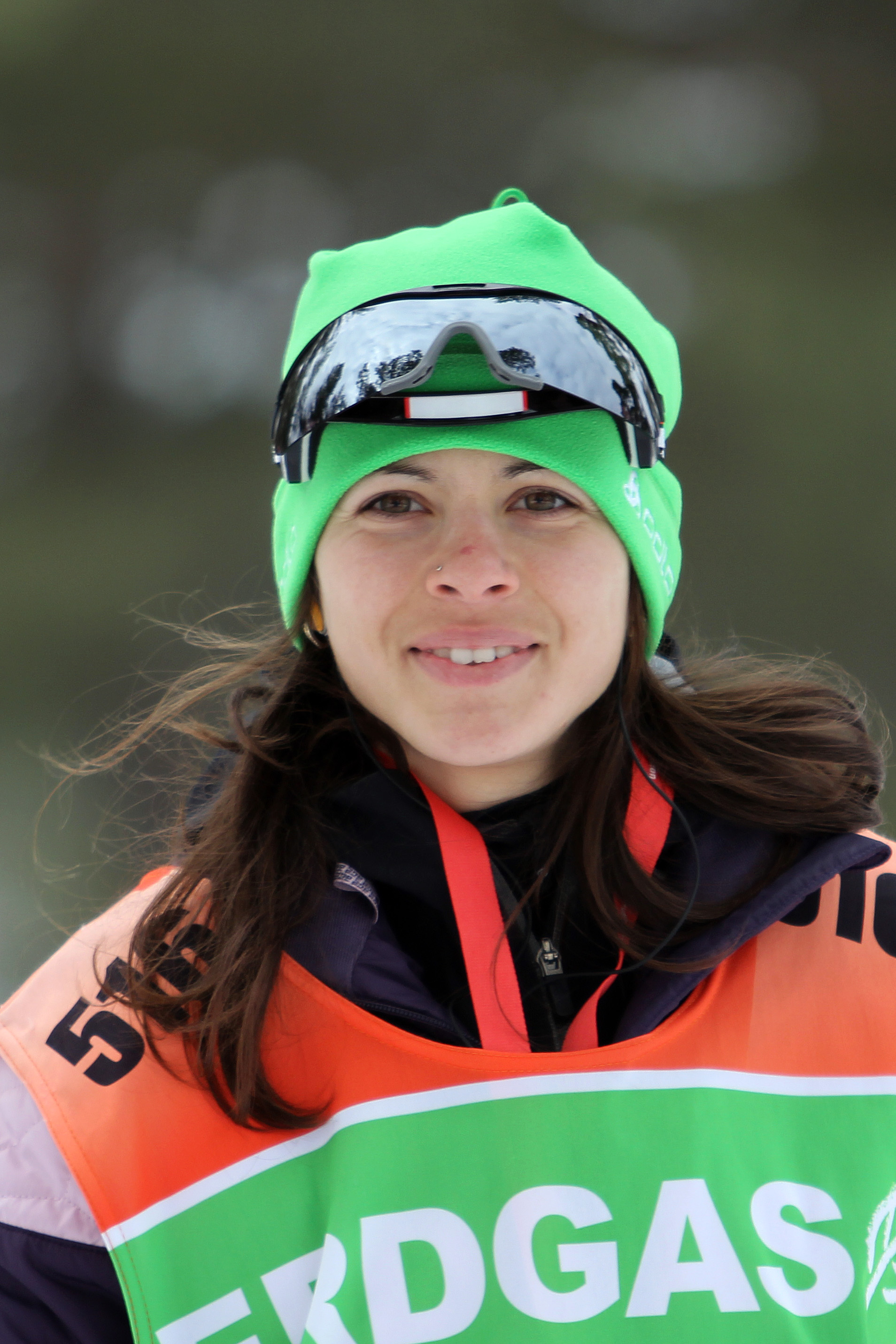
Emilia Yordanova

Emilia Yordanova (Bulgarian: Емилия Йорданова; born 5 May 1989) is a Bulgarian biathlete. She competed in the 2014/15 World Cup season, and represented Bulgaria at the Biathlon World Championships 2015 in Kontiolahti.

== Biathlon results ==
All results are sourced from the International Biathlon Union.

=== Olympic Games ===
0 medals

Event	Individual	Sprint	Pursuit	Mass start	Relay	Mixed relay
(South Korea) 2018 Pyeongchang	82nd	60th	55th	—	16th	17th

=== World Championships ===
0 medals

Event	Individual	Sprint	Pursuit	Mass start	Relay	Mixed relay	Single mixed relay
(Russia) 2011 Khanty-Mansiysk	50th	45th	LAP	—	12th	—	
(Germany) 2012 Ruhpolding	54th	42nd	46th	—	17th	22nd	
(Czech Republic) 2013 Nové Město	60th	80th	—	—	LAP	16th	
(Finland) 2015 Kontiolahti	29th	32nd	54th	—	23rd	18th	
(Norway) 2016 Oslo	53rd	47th	38th	—	20th	16th	
(Austria) 2017 Hochfilzen	24th	42nd	53rd	—	22nd	17th	
(Sweden) 2019 Östersund	68th	72nd	—	—	20th	21st	—

*During Olympic seasons competitions are only held for those events not included in the Olympic program.
**The single mixed relay was added as an event in 2019.
