= Yana Romanova =

Russian biathlete (born 1983)

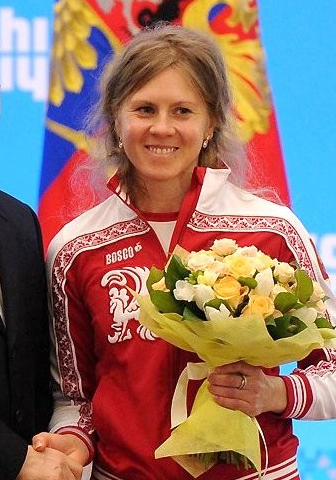
- Romanova in 2014

Personal information
- Full name: Yana Sergeyevna Romanova
- Born: 11 May 1983 (age 43) Kurgan, Russian SFSR, Soviet Union
- Height: 166 cm (5 ft 5 in)

Sport
- Sport: Skiing

World Cup career
- Seasons: 2008–2015
- Indiv. podiums: 1
- Indiv. wins: 1
Medal record
Women's biathlon
Representing Russia
Olympic Games
Disqualified	2014 Sochi	Relay
Junior World Championships
Gold medal – first place	2003 Kościelisko	3 × 6 km relay
Silver medal – second place	2003 Kościelisko	7.5 km sprint
Silver medal – second place	2003 Kościelisko	10 km pursuit
- Updated on 27 March 2010

Yana Sergeyevna Romanova (Russian: Яна Сергеевна Романова; born 11 May 1983) is a retired Russian biathlete. She competed in various events at the 2010 and 2014 Winter Olympics and won a silver medal in the 4×6 km relay in 2014. Her medal was later annulled for doping violations.

== Career ==
Romanova was awarded the Medal of the Order "For Merit to the Fatherland" I class in 2014. In May 2015, she retired from competitions. In April 2016, she became a candidate to participate in the primaries of the United Russia party in the Omsk Oblast for the elections to the State Duma.

In December 2016, the International Biathlon Union provisionally suspended her for doping violations during the 2014 Winter Olympics, along with Olga Vilukhina. On 27 November 2017, the International Olympic Committee disqualified Vilukhina and Romanova, banned them for life from the Olympics, and stripped them of their Olympic medals. On 24 September 2020, Romanova and Vilukhina's disqualifications in the individual races were overturned by the CAS, and their medals were restored.
