= 2007–08 Biathlon World Cup – World Cup 2 =

The 2007–08 Biathlon World Cup – World Cup 2 was the second event of the season and was held in Hochfilzen, Austria, from December 7 until December 9, 2007.

== Schedule of events ==
The schedule of the event is below.

Date	Time	Events
December 7	11:30 CET	Men's 10 km Sprint
December 7	14:15 CET	Women's 7.5 km Sprint
December 8	13:00 CET	Men's 12.5 km Pursuit
December 8	15:00 CET	Women's 10 km Pursuit
December 9	11:00 CET	Men's 4 x 7.5 km Relay
December 9	13:30 CET	Women's 4 x 6 km Relay

== Medal winners ==
=== Men ===
Event:	Gold:	Time	Silver:	Time	Bronze:	Time
10 km Sprint details	Dmitri Yaroshenko; Russia	23:57.8 (0+1)	Ole Einar Bjørndalen; Norway	24:35.5 (2+0)	Andrei Makoveev; Russia	24:48.8 (1+1)
12.5 km Pursuit details	Ole Einar Bjørndalen; Norway	34:57.3 (0+1+1+3)	Dmitri Yaroshenko; Russia	35:26.0 (1+0+1+3)	Daniel Graf; Germany	35:58.9 (0+0+0+0)
4 x 7.5 km Relay details	Norway; Emil Hegle Svendsen; Alexander Os; Halvard Hanevold; Ole Einar Bjørndalen	1:18:31.2 (0+4) (0+2) (0+0) (0+0)	Russia; Ivan Tcherezov; Maxim Tchoudov; Nikolay Kruglov, Jr. Dmitri Yaroshenko	1:20:56.7 (0+0) (0+1) (1+5) (1+4)	Germany; Michael Rösch; Daniel Graf; Carsten Pump; Michael Greis	1:21:27.8 (0+3) (0+4) (0+1) (0+1)

=== Women ===
Event:	Gold:	Time	Silver:	Time	Bronze:	Time
7.5 km Sprint details	Sandrine Bailly; France	21:53.0 (0+0)	Ekaterina Iourieva; Russia	22:11.8 (0+0)	Kati Wilhelm; Germany	21:26.9 (0+0)
10 km Pursuit details	Sandrine Bailly; France	31:37.7 (0+0+0+1)	Ekaterina Iourieva; Russia	32:09.1 (0+1+3+0)	Kati Wilhelm; Germany	32:10.3 (1+0+0+0)
4 x 6 km Relay details	Germany; Martina Glagow; Andrea Henkel; Simone Denkinger; Kati Wilhelm	1:23:35.0 (0+2) (0+4) (0+1) (0+3)	Russia; Svetlana Sleptsova; Olga Anisimova; Tatiana Moiseeva; Ekaterina Iourieva	1:23:54.3 (0+1) (0+3) (0+4) (0+2)	Sweden; Elisabeth Högberg; Anna Carin Olofsson; Anna Maria Nilsson; Helena Jonsson	1:23:55.3 (0+0) (0+1) (0+3) (0+1)
