= 2007–08 Biathlon World Cup – World Cup 5 =

The 2007–08 Biathlon World Cup – World Cup 5 was the fifth event of the season and was held in Ruhpolding, Germany, from January 9 until January 13, 2008.

== Schedule of events ==
| Date | Time | Events |
|---|---|---|
| January 9 | 17:20 CET | Women's 4 x 6 km Relay |
| January 10 | 17:20 CET | Men's 4 x 7.5 km Relay |
| January 11 | 14:15 CET | Women's 7.5 km Sprint |
| January 12 | 14:15 CET | Men's 10 km Sprint |
| January 13 | 13:15 CET | Women's 10 km Pursuit |
| January 13 | 15:15 CET | Men's 12.5 km Pursuit |

== Medal winners ==
=== Men ===
| Event: | Gold: | Time | Silver: | Time | Bronze: | Time |
|---|---|---|---|---|---|---|
| 4 x 7.5 km Relay details | Norway; Emil Hegle Svendsen; Rune Brattsveen; Halvard Hanevold; Ole Einar Bjørndalen | 1:27:06.9 (0+0) (0+0) (0+0) (0+0) (0+0) (0+1) (0+2) (0+1) | Russia; Ivan Tcherezov; Nikolay Kruglov Jr. Dmitri Yaroshenko; Maxim Tchoudov | 1:27:26.2 (0+0) (0+1) (0+1) (0+0) (0+1) (0+0) (0+1) (0+2) | Germany; Michael Rösch; Alexander Wolf; Carsten Pump; Michael Greis | 1:27:52.2 (0+0) (0+1) (0+0) (0+2) (0+1) (0+2) (0+1) (0+0) |
| 10 km Sprint details | Michael Greis; Germany | 24:59.2 (0+0) | Maxim Tchoudov; Russia | 25:19.0 (1+0) | Alexander Wolf; Germany | 25:29.7 (0+1) |
| 12.5 km Pursuit details | Michael Greis; Germany | 36:23.4 (0+0+0+1) | Maxim Tchoudov; Russia | 36:51.6 (1+1+1+0) | Emil Hegle Svendsen; Norway | 37:17.3 (0+0+1+0) |

=== Women ===
| Event: | Gold: | Time | Silver: | Time | Bronze: | Time |
|---|---|---|---|---|---|---|
| 4 x 6 km Relay details | Germany; Kathrin Hitzer; Magdalena Neuner; Sabrina Buchholz; Kati Wilhelm | 1:17:56.0 (1+3) (0+1) (0+0) (2+3) (0+3) (0+0) (0+0) (0+0) | Norway; Tora Berger; Anne Ingstadbjørg; Solveig Rogstad; Ann Kristin Flatland | 1:18:20.3 (0+1) (0+1) (0+0) (0+1) (0+1) (0+0) (0+2) (0+3) | Russia; Svetlana Sleptsova; Olga Anisimova; Ekaterina Iourieva; Natalia Guseva | 1:19:11.9 (0+3) (1+3) (0+0) (0+1) (0+0) (0+0) (0+1) (0+2) |
| 7.5 km Sprint details | Svetlana Sleptsova; Russia | 24:25.4 (0+0) | Helena Jonsson; Sweden | 24:43.7 (0+0) | Kati Wilhelm; Germany | 24:46.6 (0+2) |
| 10 km Pursuit details | Solveig Rogstad; Norway | 33:43.2 (0+0+0+0) | Kati Wilhelm; Germany | 33:55.8 (0+1+1+0) | Kaisa Mäkäräinen; Finland | 34:14.1 (1+0+0+0) |
