= 2007–08 Biathlon World Cup =

Biathlon competition

Discipline	Men	Women
Overall	(Norway) Ole Einar Bjørndalen	(Germany) Magdalena Neuner
Nations Cup	Norway	Germany
Individual	(France) Vincent Defrasne	(Germany) Martina Glagow
Sprint	(Norway) Ole Einar Bjørndalen	(Germany) Magdalena Neuner
Pursuit	(Norway) Ole Einar Bjørndalen	(France) Sandrine Bailly
Mass start	(Norway) Ole Einar Bjørndalen	(Germany) Magdalena Neuner
Relay	Norway	Norway

Competition

The 2007–08 Biathlon World Cup was a multi-race tournament over a season of biathlon, organised by the International Biathlon Union. The season started 28 November 2007 and ended 16 March 2008.

This article contains the top ten result listings and concise summary comments for each of the season's twenty-seven individual races and five relays for both genders, arranged by World Cup meet 1 through 9 (denoted WC 1–9), accompanied by the top ten Total Cup rankings after each of the meets plus the 2008 World Championships (held between WC 6 and 7, and in the usual way counted as a World Cup meet towards the accumulated scores).

- For a list of the Total and Relay World Cup winners and runners-up of all World Cup seasons since 1977–78, see the Biathlon World Cup article.

== Scores and leader bibs ==
- For the eighth successive season, the race victory gives 50 points, a 2nd place gives 46 pts, a 3rd place 43 pts, a 4th place 40 pts, a fifth place 37 pts, a 6th place 34 pts, then further decreasing by two pts down to the 15th place (16 pts), then linearly decreasing by one point down to the 30th place (see the Place/Points table on the page's upper right). Equal placings, i.e. same-time finishes (ties) give an equal number of points.
- The sum of all WC points of the season, minus the score from a predetermined number of events (say, 3) give the biathlete's accumulated WC score (naturally, the races chosen to be eliminated from the total will be those with the lowest scores). Biathletes with an equal number of accumulated points are ranked by number of victories, 2nd places, 3rd places, and so on, in practice reducing the possibility of ties to just about nil.
- In addition to the Total WC score as described above, the points from races in each separate single-biathlete format—Individual, Sprint, Pursuit, and Mass start—accumulate toward separate scores with associated "sub-Cups" to be won. See the main Biathlon article for a detailed description of the race formats.
- In any given race, the biathlete with the highest accumulated Total WC score before the race wears a yellow number bib. The leader of the specific race format wears a red bib. If the same biathlete leads both the Total and the specific format's World Cup, a combined yellow-and-red bib is worn. In the first races of the season, the winners of the previous season's Cups wear the associated bibs.
- There are also two multi-biathlete Cups to be won, namely the Relay and Nation Cups. The scores of the Relay races are awarded to each nation's team in the same manner as in the single-biathlete Cups. No leader bibs are worn during the Relays. For the Nation Cup, the combined scores of the three best biathletes from each nation in the Individual and Sprint races, as well as the Relay scores, are accumulated. The Nation Cup points scale is different from the World Cup points scale; each place from 1st through 30th scores 100 more points than in the World Cup, and from 31st down to 130th points are awarded on a scale from 100 to 1.

== Calendar ==
Below is the IBU World Cup calendar for the 2007–08 season.

Location	Date	Individual	Sprint	Pursuit	Mass start	Relay	Details
(Finland) Kontiolahti	29 November–2 December	●	●	●			details
(Austria) Hochfilzen	6–9 December		●	●		●	details
(Slovenia) Pokljuka	12–16 December	●	●			●	details
(Germany) Oberhof	2–6 January		●		●	●	details
(Germany) Ruhpolding	8–13 January		●	●		●	details
(Italy) Antholz	16–20 January		●	●	●		details
(Sweden) Östersund	8–17 February	●	●	●	●	●	World Championships
(South Korea) Pyeongchang	28 February–2 March		●	●			details
(Russia) Khanty-Mansiysk	5–9 March		●	●	●		details
(Norway) Holmenkollen	12–16 March		●	●	●		details
Total		3	10	8	5	5	

== Medal table ==
Rank	Nation	Gold	Silver	Bronze	Total
1	Germany	24	11	21	56
2	Norway	20	15	10	45
3	Russia	11	23	17	51
4	France	5	4	3	12
5	Poland	2	1	0	3
6	Sweden	1	3	2	6
7	Czech Republic	1	0	1	2
8	Italy	0	3	2	5
9	Austria	0	1	3	4
9	Ukraine	0	1	3	4
11	Finland	0	1	1	2
12	Belarus	0	1	0	1
13	China	0	0	1	1
Totals (13 entries)		64	64	64	192

== World Cup podiums ==
=== Men ===
Stage	Date	Place	Discipline	Winner	Second	Third	Yellow bib (After competition)	Det.
1	29 November 2007	(Finland) Kontiolahti	20 km Individual	(France) Vincent Defrasne	(Norway) Halvard Hanevold	(Russia) Maxim Tchoudov	(France) Vincent Defrasne	Detail
1	1 December 2007	(Finland) Kontiolahti	10 km Sprint	(Norway) Ole Einar Bjørndalen	(Russia) Dmitry Yaroshenko	(Germany) Carsten Pump	(France) Vincent Defrasne	Detail
1	2 December 2007	(Finland) Kontiolahti	12.5 km Pursuit	(Russia) Ivan Tcherezov	(Norway) Ole Einar Bjørndalen	(Russia) Dmitry Yaroshenko	(Russia) Ivan Tcherezov	Detail
2	7 December 2007	(Austria) Hochfilzen	10 km Sprint	(Russia) Dmitry Yaroshenko	(Norway) Ole Einar Bjørndalen	(Russia) Andrei Makoveev	(Norway) Ole Einar Bjørndalen	Detail
2	8 December 2007	(Austria) Hochfilzen	12.5 km Pursuit	(Norway) Ole Einar Bjørndalen	(Russia) Dmitry Yaroshenko	(Germany) Daniel Graf	(Norway) Ole Einar Bjørndalen	Detail
3	13 December 2007	(Slovenia) Pokljuka	20 km Individual	(Norway) Emil Hegle Svendsen	(Germany) Alexander Wolf	(Ukraine) Serhiy Sednev	(Norway) Ole Einar Bjørndalen	Detail
3	15 December 2007	(Slovenia) Pokljuka	10 km Sprint	(Norway) Ole Einar Bjørndalen	(Russia) Dmitry Yaroshenko	(Sweden) Mattias Nilsson	(Norway) Ole Einar Bjørndalen	Detail
4	5 January 2008	(Germany) Oberhof	10 km Sprint	(Poland) Tomasz Sikora	(Norway) Ole Einar Bjørndalen	(Norway) Emil Hegle Svendsen	(Norway) Ole Einar Bjørndalen	Detail
4	6 January 2008	(Germany) Oberhof	15 km Mass Start	(Norway) Ole Einar Bjørndalen	(Russia) Nikolay Kruglov	(Norway) Emil Hegle Svendsen	(Norway) Ole Einar Bjørndalen	Detail
5	12 January 2008	(Germany) Ruhpolding	10 km Sprint	(Germany) Michael Greis	(Russia) Maxim Tchoudov	(Germany) Alexander Wolf	(Norway) Ole Einar Bjørndalen	Detail
5	13 January 2008	(Germany) Ruhpolding	12.5 km Pursuit	(Germany) Michael Greis	(Russia) Maxim Tchoudov	(Norway) Emil Hegle Svendsen	(Norway) Ole Einar Bjørndalen	Detail
6	18 January 2008	(Italy) Antholz-Anterselva	10 km Sprint	(Germany) Michael Greis	(Russia) Nikolay Kruglov	(Norway) Ole Einar Bjørndalen	(Norway) Ole Einar Bjørndalen	Detail
6	19 January 2008	(Italy) Antholz-Anterselva	12.5 km Pursuit	(Sweden) Björn Ferry	(Russia) Nikolay Kruglov	(Germany) Michael Greis	(Norway) Ole Einar Bjørndalen	Detail
6	20 January 2008	(Italy) Antholz-Anterselva	15 km Mass Start	(Norway) Ole Einar Bjørndalen	(Sweden) Björn Ferry	(Germany) Michael Greis	(Norway) Ole Einar Bjørndalen	Detail
WC	9 February 2008	(Sweden) Östersund	10 km Sprint	(Russia) Maxim Tchoudov	(Norway) Halvard Hanevold	(Norway) Ole Einar Bjørndalen	(Norway) Ole Einar Bjørndalen	Detail
WC	10 February 2008	(Sweden) Östersund	12.5 km Pursuit	(Norway) Ole Einar Bjørndalen	(Russia) Maxim Tchoudov	(Germany) Alexander Wolf	(Norway) Ole Einar Bjørndalen	Detail
WC	14 February 2008	(Sweden) Östersund	20 km Individual	(Norway) Emil Hegle Svendsen	(Norway) Ole Einar Bjørndalen	(Russia) Maxim Maksimov	(Norway) Ole Einar Bjørndalen	Detail
WC	17 February 2008	(Sweden) Östersund	15 km Mass Start	(Norway) Emil Hegle Svendsen	(Norway) Ole Einar Bjørndalen	(Russia) Maxim Tchoudov	(Norway) Ole Einar Bjørndalen	Detail
7	27 February 2008	(South Korea) Pyeongchang	10 km Sprint	(Norway) Emil Hegle Svendsen	(Norway) Halvard Hanevold	(Austria) Friedrich Pinter	(Norway) Ole Einar Bjørndalen	Detail
7	29 February 2008	(South Korea) Pyeongchang	12.5 km Pursuit	(Germany) Michael Greis	(Norway) Halvard Hanevold	(Norway) Alexander Os	(Norway) Ole Einar Bjørndalen	Detail
8	6 March 2008	(Russia) Khanty-Mansiysk	10 km Sprint	(Norway) Ole Einar Bjørndalen	(Norway) Emil Hegle Svendsen	(Russia) Andrei Makoveev	(Norway) Ole Einar Bjørndalen	Detail
8	8 March 2008	(Russia) Khanty-Mansiysk	12.5 km Pursuit	(Norway) Emil Hegle Svendsen	(Poland) Tomasz Sikora	(Russia) Andrei Makoveev	(Norway) Ole Einar Bjørndalen	Detail
8	9 March 2008	(Russia) Khanty-Mansiysk	15 km Mass Start	(Poland) Tomasz Sikora	(Germany) Daniel Graf	(Czech Republic) Michal Šlesingr	(Norway) Ole Einar Bjørndalen	Detail
9	13 March 2008	(Norway) Oslo Holmenkollen	10 km Sprint	(Norway) Emil Hegle Svendsen	(Germany) Michael Rösch	(Austria) Friedrich Pinter	(Norway) Ole Einar Bjørndalen	Detail
9	15 March 2008	(Norway) Oslo Holmenkollen	12.5 km Pursuit	(Russia) Ivan Tcherezov	(Austria) Friedrich Pinter	(Norway) Emil Hegle Svendsen	(Norway) Ole Einar Bjørndalen	Detail
9	16 March 2008	(Norway) Oslo Holmenkollen	15 km Mass Start	(Czech Republic) Michal Šlesingr	(Russia) Nikolay Kruglov	(Norway) Halvard Hanevold	(Norway) Ole Einar Bjørndalen	Detail

=== Women ===
Stage	Date	Place	Discipline	Winner	Second	Third	Yellow bib (After competition)	Det.
1	29 November 2007	(Finland) Kontiolahti	15 km Individual	(Germany) Martina Glagow	(Russia) Tatiana Moiseeva	(Germany) Simone Denkinger	(Germany) Martina Glagow	Detail
1	30 November 2007	(Finland) Kontiolahti	7.5 km Sprint	(Germany) Martina Glagow	(Germany) Kati Wilhelm	(Norway) Tora Berger	(Germany) Martina Glagow	Detail
1	2 December 2007	(Finland) Kontiolahti	10 km Pursuit	(Norway) Tora Berger	(Germany) Andrea Henkel	(Germany) Martina Glagow	(Germany) Martina Glagow	Detail
2	7 December 2007	(Austria) Hochfilzen	7.5 km Sprint	(France) Sandrine Bailly	(Russia) Ekaterina Iourieva	(Germany) Kati Wilhelm	(Germany) Martina Glagow	Detail
2	8 December 2007	(Austria) Hochfilzen	10 km Pursuit	(France) Sandrine Bailly	(Russia) Ekaterina Iourieva	(Germany) Kati Wilhelm	(France) Sandrine Bailly	Detail
3	13 December 2007	(Slovenia) Pokljuka	15 km Individual	(Russia) Ekaterina Iourieva	(Italy) Michela Ponza	(Germany) Martina Glagow	(Germany) Martina Glagow	Detail
3	15 December 2007	(Slovenia) Pokljuka	7.5 km Sprint	(France) Sandrine Bailly	(Finland) Kaisa Mäkäräinen	(Germany) Magdalena Neuner	(Germany) Martina Glagow	Detail
4	5 January 2008	(Germany) Oberhof	7.5 km Sprint	(Norway) Tora Berger	(Russia) Svetlana Sleptsova	(Germany) Magdalena Neuner	(Germany) Martina Glagow	Detail
4	6 January 2008	(Germany) Oberhof	12.5 km Mass Start	(Germany) Magdalena Neuner	(Russia) Olga Anisimova	(Russia) Tatiana Moiseeva	(Germany) Martina Glagow	Detail
5	11 January 2008	(Germany) Ruhpolding	7.5 km Sprint	(Finland) Kaisa Varis	(Russia) Svetlana Sleptsova	(Sweden) Helena Jonsson	(Germany) Martina Glagow	Detail
5	13 January 2008	(Germany) Ruhpolding	10 km Pursuit	(Norway) Solveig Rogstad	(Germany) Kati Wilhelm	(Finland) Kaisa Mäkäräinen	(Germany) Kati Wilhelm	Detail
6	17 January 2008	(Italy) Antholz-Anterselva	7.5 km Sprint	(Germany) Kati Wilhelm	(Germany) Andrea Henkel	(Russia) Svetlana Sleptsova	(Germany) Kati Wilhelm	Detail
6	19 January 2008	(Italy) Antholz-Anterselva	10 km Pursuit	(Germany) Andrea Henkel	(Russia) Svetlana Sleptsova	(Norway) Tora Berger	(Germany) Kati Wilhelm	Detail
6	20 January 2008	(Italy) Antholz-Anterselva	12.5 km Mass Start	(Germany) Andrea Henkel	(Sweden) Anna Carin Olofsson	(Germany) Kati Wilhelm	(Germany) Kati Wilhelm	Detail
WC	9 February 2008	(Sweden) Östersund	7.5 km Sprint	(Germany) Andrea Henkel	(Russia) Albina Akhatova	(Ukraine) Oksana Khvostenko	(Germany) Andrea Henkel	Detail
WC	10 February 2008	(Sweden) Östersund	10 km Pursuit	(Germany) Andrea Henkel	(Russia) Ekaterina Iourieva	(Russia) Albina Akhatova	(Germany) Andrea Henkel	Detail
WC	14 February 2008	(Sweden) Östersund	15 km Individual	(Russia) Ekaterina Iourieva	(Germany) Martina Glagow	(Ukraine) Oksana Khvostenko	(Germany) Andrea Henkel	Detail
WC	16 February 2008	(Sweden) Östersund	12.5 km Mass Start	(Germany) Magdalena Neuner	(Norway) Tora Berger	(Russia) Ekaterina Iourieva	(Germany) Andrea Henkel	Detail
7	28 February 2008	(South Korea) Pyeongchang	7.5 km Sprint	(Germany) Magdalena Neuner	(France) Sandrine Bailly	(Italy) Michela Ponza	(France) Sandrine Bailly	Detail
7	1 March 2008	(South Korea) Pyeongchang	10 km Pursuit	(France) Sandrine Bailly	(Italy) Michela Ponza	(Russia) Albina Akhatova	(France) Sandrine Bailly	Detail
8	6 March 2008	(Russia) Khanty-Mansiysk	7.5 km Sprint	(Germany) Magdalena Neuner	(France) Sandrine Bailly	(Russia) Albina Akhatova	(France) Sandrine Bailly	Detail
8	8 March 2008	(Russia) Khanty-Mansiysk	10 km Pursuit	(Germany) Kathrin Hitzer	(France) Sandrine Bailly	(Germany) Andrea Henkel	(France) Sandrine Bailly	Detail
8	9 March 2008	(Russia) Khanty-Mansiysk	12.5 km Mass Start	(Germany) Kathrin Hitzer	(Germany) Magdalena Neuner	(Russia) Svetlana Sleptsova	(Germany) Magdalena Neuner	Detail
9	13 March 2008	(Norway) Oslo Holmenkollen	7.5 km Sprint	(Russia) Svetlana Sleptsova	(Norway) Tora Berger	(Germany) Kati Wilhelm	(Germany) Magdalena Neuner	Detail
9	15 March 2008	(Norway) Oslo Holmenkollen	10 km Pursuit	(Russia) Svetlana Sleptsova	(Germany) Kati Wilhelm	(China) Liu Xianying	(Germany) Magdalena Neuner	Detail
9	16 March 2008	(Norway) Oslo Holmenkollen	12.5 km Mass Start	(Germany) Kati Wilhelm	(Norway) Solveig Rogstad	(Italy) Michela Ponza	(Germany) Magdalena Neuner	Detail

=== Men's team ===
Event	Date	Place	Discipline	Winner	Second	Third
2	9 December 2007	(Austria) Hochfilzen	4x7.5 km Relay	Norway Emil Hegle Svendsen; Alexander Os; Halvard Hanevold; Ole Einar Bjørndalen	Russia Ivan Tcherezov; Maxim Tchoudov; Nikolay Kruglov; Dmitry Yaroshenko	Germany Michael Rösch; Daniel Graf; Carsten Pump; Michael Greis
3	16 December 2007	(Slovenia) Pokljuka	4x7.5 km Relay	Russia Andrei Makoveev; Maxim Tchoudov; Dmitry Yaroshenko; Nikolay Kruglov	Germany Michael Rösch; Alexander Wolf; Andreas Birnbacher; Michael Greis	Austria Daniel Mesotitsch; Friedrich Pinter; Dominik Landertinger; Simon Eder
4	4 January 2008	(Germany) Oberhof	4x7.5 km Relay	Norway Emil Hegle Svendsen; Alexander Os; Halvard Hanevold; Ole Einar Bjørndalen	Russia Ivan Tcherezov; Maxim Tchoudov; Dmitry Yaroshenko; Nikolay Kruglov	Germany Michael Rösch; Alexander Wolf; Carsten Pump; Michael Greis
5	10 January 2008	(Germany) Ruhpolding	4x7.5 km Relay	Norway Emil Hegle Svendsen; Rune Brattsveen; Halvard Hanevold; Ole Einar Bjørndalen	Russia Ivan Tcherezov; Nikolay Kruglov; Dmitry Yaroshenko; Maxim Tchoudov	Germany Michael Rösch; Alexander Wolf; Carsten Pump; Michael Greis
WC	16 February 2008	(Sweden) Östersund	4x7.5 km Relay	Russia Ivan Tcherezov; Nikolay Kruglov; Dmitry Yaroshenko; Maxim Tchoudov	Norway Emil Hegle Svendsen; Rune Brattsveen; Halvard Hanevold; Ole Einar Bjørndalen	Germany Michael Rösch; Alexander Wolf; Andreas Birnbacher; Michael Greis

=== Women's team ===
Event	Date	Place	Discipline	Winner	Second	Third
2	9 December 2007	(Austria) Hochfilzen	4x6 km Relay	Germany Martina Glagow; Andrea Henkel; Simone Denkinger; Kati Wilhelm	Russia Svetlana Sleptsova; Olga Anisimova; Tatiana Moiseeva; Ekaterina Iourieva	Sweden Elisabeth Högberg; Anna Carin Olofsson; Anna Maria Nilsson; Helena Jonsson
3	16 December 2007	(Slovenia) Pokljuka	4x6 km Relay	Germany Martina Glagow; Sabrina Buchholz; Magdalena Neuner; Andrea Henkel	Russia Svetlana Sleptsova; Oksana Neupokoeva; Natalia Guseva; Ekaterina Iourieva	France Delphyne Peretto; Marie-Laure Brunet; Sylvie Becaert; Sandrine Bailly
4	3 January 2008	(Germany) Oberhof	4x6 km Relay	Germany Simone Denkinger; Andrea Henkel; Kathrin Hitzer; Kati Wilhelm	France Delphyne Peretto; Sylvie Becaert; Pauline Macabies; Sandrine Bailly	Russia Svetlana Sleptsova; Oksana Neupokoeva; Tatiana Moiseeva; Natalia Guseva
5	9 January 2008	(Germany) Ruhpolding	4x6 km Relay	Germany Kathrin Hitzer; Magdalena Neuner; Sabrina Buchholz; Kati Wilhelm	Norway Tora Berger; Anne Ingstadbjorg; Solveig Rogstad; Ann Kristin Flatland	Russia Svetlana Sleptsova; Olga Anisimova; Ekaterina Iourieva; Natalia Guseva
WC	17 February 2008	(Sweden) Östersund	4x6 km Relay	Germany Martina Glagow; Andrea Henkel; Magdalena Neuner; Kati Wilhelm	Ukraine Oksana Yakovlieva; Vita Semerenko; Valj Semerenko; Oksana Khvostenko	France Delphyne Peretto; Marie-Laure Brunet; Sylvie Becaert; Sandrine Bailly

=== Mixed ===
Event	Date	Place	Discipline	Winner	Second	Third
WC	12 February 2008	(Sweden) Östersund	2x6 km + 2x7.5 km Mixed Relay	Germany Sabrina Buchholz; Magdalena Neuner; Andreas Birnbacher; Michael Greis	Belarus Liudmila Kalinchik; Darya Domracheva; Rustam Valiullin; Sergey Novikov	Russia Svetlana Sleptsova; Oksana Neupokoeva; Nikolay Kruglov; Dmitry Yaroshenko
7	2 March 2008	(South Korea) Pyeongchang	2x6 km + 2x7.5 km Mixed Relay	Norway Ann Kristin Flatland; Solveig Rogstad; Hans Martin Gjedrem; Alexander Os	Italy Michela Ponza; Katja Haller; René-Laurent Vuillermoz; Christian De Lorenzi	France Julie Carraz-Collin; Pauline Macabies; Simon Fourcade; Alexis Bœuf

== Standings: Men ==
=== Overall ===
Pos.		Points
1.	(Norway) Ole Einar Bjørndalen	869
2.	(Russia) Dmitry Yaroshenko	696
3.	(Norway) Emil Hegle Svendsen	687
4.	(Germany) Michael Greis	596
5.	(Russia) Ivan Tcherezov	573

- Final standings after 26 races.

=== Individual ===
Pos.		Points
1.	(France) Vincent Defrasne	104
2.	(Norway) Emil Hegle Svendsen	100
3.	(Norway) Halvard Hanevold	82
4.	(Russia) Maxim Tchoudov	80
5.	(Austria) Friedrich Pinter	69

- Final standings after 3 races.

=== Sprint ===
Pos.		Points
1.	(Norway) Ole Einar Bjørndalen	383
2.	(Russia) Dmitry Yaroshenko	291
3.	(Norway) Emil Hegle Svendsen	253
4.	(Germany) Michael Greis	233
5.	(Sweden) Björn Ferry	222

- Final standings after 10 races.

=== Pursuit ===
Pos.		Points
1.	(Norway) Ole Einar Bjørndalen	247
2.	(Russia) Dmitry Yaroshenko	233
3.	(Sweden) Björn Ferry	221
4.	(Germany) Michael Greis	220
5.	(Russia) Ivan Tcherezov	220

- Final standings after 8 races.

=== Mass start ===
Pos.		Points
1.	(Norway) Ole Einar Bjørndalen	180
2.	(Russia) Nikolay Kruglov	143
3.	(Russia) Dmitry Yaroshenko	128
4.	(Germany) Michael Greis	125
5.	(Norway) Emil Hegle Svendsen	124

- Final standings after 5 races.

=== Relay ===
Pos.		Points
1.	Norway	196
2.	Russia	192
3.	Germany	175
4.	Sweden	148
5.	Austria	147

- Final standings after 5 races.

=== Nation ===
Pos.		Points
1.	Norway	5830
2.	Russia	5744
3.	Germany	5450
4.	Austria	4857
5.	Sweden	4750

- Final standings after 18 races.

== Standings: Women ==
=== Overall ===
Pos.		Points
1.	(Germany) Magdalena Neuner	815
2.	(France) Sandrine Bailly	804
3.	(Germany) Andrea Henkel	764
4.	(Germany) Kati Wilhelm	746
5.	(Germany) Martina Glagow	675

- Final standings after 26 races.

=== Individual ===
Pos.		Points
1.	(Germany) Martina Glagow	139
2.	(Russia) Tatiana Moiseeva	111
3.	(Russia) Ekaterina Iourieva	107
4.	(Sweden) Helena Jonsson	98
5.	(Slovenia) Teja Gregorin	81

- Final standings after 3 races.

=== Sprint ===
Pos.		Points
1.	(Germany) Magdalena Neuner	324
2.	(France) Sandrine Bailly	318
3.	(Germany) Kati Wilhelm	303
4.	(Germany) Andrea Henkel	297
5.	(Russia) Svetlana Sleptsova	293

- Final standings after 10 races.

=== Pursuit ===
Pos.		Points
1.	(France) Sandrine Bailly	300
2.	(Germany) Andrea Henkel	289
3.	(Germany) Kati Wilhelm	253
4.	(Norway) Tora Berger	238
5.	(Germany) Magdalena Neuner	231

- Final standings after 8 races.

=== Mass start ===
Pos.		Points
1.	(Germany) Magdalena Neuner	186
2.	(Germany) Kati Wilhelm	138
3.	(Italy) Michela Ponza	135
4.	(Sweden) Helena Jonsson	135
5.	(Russia) Ekaterina Iourieva	127

- Final standings after 5 races.

=== Relay ===
Pos.		Points
1.	Germany	250
2.	Russia	178
3.	France	172
4.	Norway	154
5.	Ukraine	152

- Final standings after 5 races.

=== Nation ===
Pos.		Points
1.	Germany	5896
2.	Russia	5578
3.	France	5071
4.	Norway	5044
5.	Sweden	4865

- Final standings after 18 races.

== Achievements ==
First World Cup career victory

- Tora Berger (NOR), 26, in her 6th season — the WC 1 Pursuit in Kontiolahti; first podium was 2004–05 Sprint in Antholz-Anterselva
- Dmitri Yaroshenko (RUS) 31, in his 6th season — the WC 2 Sprint in Hochfilzen; first podium was 2006–07 Sprint in Östersund
- Emil Hegle Svendsen (NOR), 22, in his 3rd season — the WC 3 Individual in Pokljuka; first podium was 2006–07 Sprint in Ruhpolding
- Ekaterina Iourieva (RUS), 24, in her 3rd season — the WC 3 Individual in Pokljuka; first podium was 2006–07 Sprint in Lahti
- Kaisa Varis (FIN), 32, in her 2nd season — the WC 5 Sprint in Ruhpolding; also her first individual podium
- Svetlana Sleptsova (RUS), 21, in her 2nd season — the WC 5 Sprint in Ruhpolding; first podium was 2007–08 in the WC 4 Sprint in Oberhof
- Solveig Rogstad (NOR), 25, in her 3rd season — the WC 5 Pursuit in Ruhpolding; also her first individual podium
- Björn Ferry (SWE), 29, in his 7th season — the WC 6 Pursuit in Antholz-Anterselva; first podium was 2004–05 Sprint in Torino - Cesana San Sicario
- Kathrin Hitzer (GER), 21, in her 2nd season — the WC 8 Pursuit in Khanty-Mansiysk; first podium was 2006–07 Pursuit in Lahti
- Michal Šlesingr (CZE), 25, in his 7th season — the WC 9 Mass Start in Holmenkollen; first podium was 2006–07 Sprint in Antholz-Anterselva

First World Cup podium

- Carsten Pump (GER), 31, in his 6th season — no. 3 in the WC 1 Sprint in Kontiolahti
- Daniel Graf (GER), 26, in his 5th season — no. 3 in the WC 2 Pursuit in Hochfilzen
- Serhiy Sednev (UKR), 23, in his 4th season — no. 3 in the WC 3 Individual in Pokljuka
- Kaisa Mäkäräinen (FIN), 24, in her 3rd season — no. 2 in the WC 3 Sprint in Pokljuka
- Olga Anisimova (RUS), 35, in her 6th season — no. 2 in the WC 4 Mass Start in Oberhof
- Maxim Maksimov (RUS), 28, in his 2nd season — no. 3 in the World Championships 2008 Individual in Östersund
- Friedrich Pinter (AUT), 30, in his 7th season — no. 3 in the WC 7 Sprint in Pyeongchang

Victory in this World Cup (all-time number of victories in parentheses)

Men

- Ole Einar Bjørndalen (NOR), 7 (81) first places
- Emil Hegle Svendsen (NOR), 6 (6) first places
- Michael Greis (GER), 4 (9) first places
- Tomasz Sikora (POL), 2 (4) first places
- Ivan Tcherezov (RUS), 2 (3) first places
- Vincent Defrasne (FRA), 1 (3) first places
- Maxim Tchoudov (RUS), 1 (2) first places
- Dmitri Yaroshenko (RUS), 1 (1) first place
- Björn Ferry (SWE), 1 (1) first place
- Michal Šlesingr (CZE), 1 (1) first place

Women

- Sandrine Bailly (FRA) 4 (20) first places
- Andrea Henkel (GER), 4 (14) first places
- Magdalena Neuner (GER), 4 (11) first places
- Svetlana Sleptsova (RUS), 3 (3) first places
- Kati Wilhelm (GER), 2 (18) first places
- Martina Glagow (GER), 2 (13) first places
- Tora Berger (NOR), 2 (2) first places
- Ekaterina Iourieva (RUS), 2 (2) first places
- Kathrin Hitzer (GER), 2 (2) first places
- Solveig Rogstad (NOR), 1 (1) first place
- Kaisa Varis (FIN), 1 (1) first place

== Retirements ==
Following notable biathletes retired after the 2007–08 season:

- Ludwig Gredler (AUT)
- Ferréol Cannard (FRA)
- Julien Robert (FRA)
- Alexei Aidarov (UKR)
- Nathalie Santer (BEL)
- Saskia Santer (BEL)
- Kaisa Varis (FIN)
- Delphyne Peretto (FRA)
- Jenny Adler (GER)
- Ute Niziak (GER)
- Gunn Margit Andreassen (NOR)
- Tatiana Moiseeva (RUS)
- Petra Slezakova (SVK)
