= 2007–08 Biathlon World Cup – World Cup 4 =

The 2007–08 Biathlon World Cup – World Cup 4 was the fourth event of the season and was held in Oberhof, Germany, from January 3 until January 6, 2008.

== Schedule of events ==
Date	Time	Events
January 3	17:20 CET	Women's 4 x 6 km Relay
January 4	17:20 CET	Men's 4 x 7.5 km Relay
January 5	12:30 CET	Women's 7.5 km Sprint
January 5	14:55 CET	Men's 10 km Sprint
January 6	13:00 CET	Women's 12.5 km Mass Start
January 6	15:00 CET	Men's 15 km Mass Start

== Medal winners ==
=== Men ===
Event:	Gold:	Time	Silver:	Time	Bronze:	Time
4 x 7.5 km Relay details	Norway; Emil Hegle Svendsen; Alexander Os; Halvard Hanevold; Ole Einar Bjørndalen	1:21:40.0 (0+2) (0+2) (0+3) (0+1) (0+1) (0+1) (0+3) (0+2)	Russia; Ivan Tcherezov; Maxim Tchoudov; Dmitri Yaroshenko; Nikolay Kruglov, Jr.	1:21:43.4 (0+1) (0+0) (0+3) (0+0) (0+1) (0+2) (1+3) (0+1)	Germany; Michael Rösch; Alexander Wolf; Andreas Birnbacher; Michael Greis	1:22:28.6 (0+3) (0+1) (0+0) (0+0) (0+3) (0+2) (2+3) (0+0)
10 km Sprint details	Tomasz Sikora; Poland	28:13.3 (0+0)	Ole Einar Bjørndalen; Norway	28:29.5 (2+1)	Emil Hegle Svendsen; Norway	28:30.0 (1+1)
15 km Mass Start details	Ole Einar Bjørndalen; Norway	38:58.9 (1+0+0+1)	Nikolay Kruglov, Jr. Russia	39:33.0 (0+0+1+0)	Emil Hegle Svendsen; Norway	39:53.0 (1+0+1+1)

=== Women ===
Event:	Gold:	Time	Silver:	Time	Bronze:	Time
4 x 6 km Relay details	Germany; Simone Denkinger; Andrea Henkel; Kathrin Hitzer; Kati Wilhelm	1:15:41.1 (0+0) (2+3) (0+0) (0+0) (0+1) (0+2) (0+0) (0+2)	France; Delphyne Peretto; Sylvie Becaert; Pauline Macabies; Sandrine Bailly	1:15:53.3 (0+0) (0+0) (0+0) (0+2) (0+1) (0+2) (0+0) (0+2)	Russia; Svetlana Sleptsova; Oksana Neupokoeva; Tatiana Moiseeva; Natalia Guseva	1:16:07.1 (0+0) (0+1) (0+0) (1+3) (0+0) (0+1) (0+0) (0+0)
7.5 km Sprint details	Tora Berger; Norway	23:58.2 (0+0)	Svetlana Sleptsova; Russia	24:03.7 (1+1)	Magdalena Neuner; Germany	24:08.9 (1+3)
12.5 km Mass Start details	Magdalena Neuner; Germany	40:46.1 (0+0+1+1)	Olga Anisimova; Russia	41:45.3 (0+0+1+1)	Tatiana Moiseeva; Russia	41:49.8 (0+2+0+1)
