= 2010–11 Biathlon World Cup – Sprint Women =

The 2010–11 Biathlon World Cup – Sprint Women will start at Friday December 3, 2010 in Östersund and will finish Thursday March 17, 2011 in Oslo. Defending titlist is Simone Hauswald of Germany.

== Competition format ==
The 10 kilometres (6,23 mi) sprint race is the third oldest biathlon event; the distance is skied over three laps. The biathlete shoots two times at any shooting lane, first prone, then standing, totalling 10 targets. For each missed target the biathlete has to complete a penalty lap of around 150 metres. Competitors' starts are staggered, normally by 30 seconds.

== 2009–10 Top 3 Standings ==
Medal	Athlete	Points
Gold:	(Germany) Simone Hauswald	345
Silver:	(Germany) Magdalena Neuner	334
Bronze:	(Sweden) Helena Jonsson	332

== Medal winners ==
Event:	Gold:	Time	Silver:	Time	Bronze:	Time
Östersund details	Kaisa Mäkäräinen; Finland	22:42.1 (0+0)	Miriam Gössner; Germany	23:00.8 (0+0)	Darya Domracheva; Belarus	23:29.2 (1+0)
Hochfilzen details	Anastasiya Kuzmina; Slovakia	25:30.6 (0+0)	Darya Domracheva; Belarus	25:50.4 (0+1)	Kaisa Mäkäräinen; Finland	25:54.4 (0+1)
Pokljuka details	Magdalena Neuner; Germany	23:05.2 (0+2)	Anastasiya Kuzmina; Slovakia	23:16.4 (0+1)	Kaisa Mäkäräinen; Finland; Olga Zaitseva; Russia	23:22.2 (1+0); 23:22.2 (0+0)
Oberhof details	Ann Kristin Flatland; Norway	23:29.5 (1+0)	Magdalena Neuner; Germany	23:35.2 (1+1)	Andrea Henkel; Germany	23:44.7 (0+1)
Ruhpolding details	Tora Berger; Norway	20:33.3 (0+0)	Andrea Henkel; Germany	20:34.4 (0+0)	Magdalena Neuner; Germany	20:49.1 (0+1)
Antholz details	Tora Berger; Norway	20:08.1 (0+0)	Anastasiya Kuzmina; Slovakia	20:37.2 (0+1)	Olga Zaitseva; Russia	20:44.5 (0+1)
Presque Isle details	Helena Ekholm; Sweden	20:38.7 (0+0)	Tora Berger; Norway	20:47.5 (0+1)	Valj Semerenko; Ukraine	20:58.1 (0+0)
Fort Kent details	Andrea Henkel; Germany	23:20.0 (0+0)	Miriam Gössner; Germany	23:30.9 (0+2)	Magdalena Neuner; Germany	23:35.8 (1+1)
World Championships 2011 details	Magdalena Neuner; Germany	20:31.2 (0+0)	Kaisa Mäkäräinen; Finland	20:43.4 (0+0)	Anastasiya Kuzmina; Slovakia	21:11.2 (0+1)
Oslo details	Magdalena Neuner; Germany	21:04.6 (0+1)	Tora Berger; Norway	21:35.9 (0+1)	Darya Domracheva; Belarus	21:50.7 (0+2)

== Standings ==
#	Name	ÖST	HOC	POK	OBE	RUH	ANT	PRI	FRK	WCH	OSL	Total
1	Magdalena Neuner (GER)	—	36	60	54	48	—	38	48	60	60	404
2	Kaisa Mäkäräinen (FIN)	60	48	48	40	34	19	32	34	54	22	391
3	Tora Berger (NOR)	—	32	0	17	60	60	54	43	36	54	356
4	Andrea Henkel (GER)	38	21	12	48	54	43	16	60	21	36	349
5	Anastasiya Kuzmina (SVK)	2	60	54	29	38	54	—	—	48	43	328
6	Helena Ekholm (SWE)	40	40	36	32	32	22	60	19	40	3	324
7	Darya Domracheva (BLR)	48	54	20	43	27	0	30	38	15	48	323
8	Teja Gregorin (SLO)	36	30	25	16	29	38	29	40	27	27	297
9	Miriam Gössner (GER)	54	23	29	0	24	24	20	54	32	6	266
10	Marie Dorin (FRA)	15	6	38	21	17	30	40	36	34	28	265
11	Anna Carin Zidek (SWE)	32	29	17	34	36	14	24	27	30	12	255
12	Ann Kristin Flatland (NOR)	3	43	13	60	31	20	13	26	7	29	245
13	Olga Zaitseva (RUS)	34	0	48	4	43	48	—	—	43	22	242
14	Valj Semerenko (UKR)	31	27	27	28	18	28	48	2	31	0	240
15	Kathrin Hitzer (GER)	28	25	34	27	11	15	28	21	14	34	237
16	Marie Laure Brunet (FRA)	22	38	28	30	40	23	15	29	0	—	225
17	Ekaterina Yurlova (RUS)	5	28	21	38	30	31	—	—	38	17	208
18	Vita Semerenko (UKR)	10	26	26	36	21	25	—	—	23	40	207
19	Anna Bogaliy-Titovets (RUS)	30	34	32	—	8	34	—	—	20	16	174
20	Anais Bescond (FRA)	23	13	40	13	15	3	—	28	2	26	163
21	Tina Bachmann (GER)	43	0	31	7	10	29	4	19	—	8	151
22	Agnieszka Cyl (POL)	26	2	23	24	—	0	38	9	28	—	150
23	Anna Maria Nilsson (SWE)	16	12	—	2	14	27	6	17	29	15	138
24	Eveli Saue (EST)	9	31	16	20	0	32	0	25	0	2	135
25	Michela Ponza (ITA)	0	4	10	0	13	17	43	5	18	24	134
26	Natalia Guseva (RUS)	—	—	22	15	0	36	22	0	—	38	133
27	Svetlana Sleptsova (RUS)	27	0	18	11	23	0	31	0	—	20	130
28	Nadezhda Skardino (BLR)	20	22	11	0	4	10	0	31	25	0	123
29	Olena Pidhrushna (UKR)	7	0	30	0	22	21	—	—	10	30	120
30	Selina Gasparin (SUI)	0	17	4	0	0	40	26	1	0	26	114
31	Iana Romanova (RUS)	24	18	—	14	28	12	0	13	—	—	109
32	Andreja Mali (SLO)	29	20	0	0	19	0	14	6	11	0	99
33	Sabrina Buchholz (GER)	25	14	14	25	0	0	17	4	—	0	99
34	Sara Studebaker (USA)	0	15	0	1	9	0	27	24	0	18	94
35	Éva Tófalvi (ROU)	0	10	0	12	26	0	0	10	26	—	84
36	Sophie Boilley (FRA)	0	7	0	—	—	—	34	20	7	13	81
37	Fanny Welle-Strand Horn (NOR)	0	11	0	0	0	0	3	11	17	32	74
38	Liudmila Kalinchik (BLR)	12	0	0	23	2	5	0	30	0	0	72
39	Jana Gereková (SVK)	17	16	5	0	0	6	—	—	24	0	68
40	Marina Lebedeva (KAZ)	0	19	7	31	0	0	—	—	5	—	62
41	Inna Suprun (UKR)	0	9	0	—	0	0	0	32	19	0	60
42	Jenny Jonsson (SWE)	—	—	6	5	0	26	23	—	—	0	60
43	Madara Liduma (LAT)	14	0	15	0	25	2	—	—	0	0	56
44	Pauline Macabies (FRA)	0	24	—	0	20	0	8	3	—	0	55
45	Katja Haller (ITA)	19	0	0	18	0	1	12	0	1	0	51
46	Veronika Vítková (CZE)	0	0	—	9	0	0	18	0	0	23	50
47	Synnøve Solemdal (NOR)	21	0	0	0	7	0	21	—	0	0	49
48	Uliana Denisova (RUS)	—	—	—	—	—	—	25	23	—	—	48
49	Laura Spector (USA)	0	0	0	22	5	18	0	0	0	0	45
50	Tadeja Brankovič-Likozar (SLO)	0	0	0	—	12	11	—	—	22	0	45
51	Oksana Khvostenko (UKR)	18	—	0	26	—	0	—	—	—	—	44
52	Natalya Burdyga (UKR)	—	—	—	—	0	13	19	7	—	0	39
53	Anna Karin Strömstedt (SWE)	0	0	0	—	0	0	10	14	0	10	34
54	Nina Klenovska (BUL)	—	0	0	0	0	16	9	8	0	—	33
55	Weronika Nowakowska-Ziemniak (POL)	8	0	0	—	—	9	—	16	—	—	33
56	Mari Laukkanen (FIN)	0	0	—	10	—	0	11	0	12	0	33
57	Evgeniya Sedova (RUS)	—	—	—	—	—	—	—	—	—	31	31
58	Dorothea Wierer (ITA)	—	0	—	0	17	—	—	—	13	0	30
59	Ekaterina Glazyrina (RUS)	—	—	—	—	—	—	2	22	—	4	28
60	Zina Kocher (CAN)	0	0	24	0	0	—	—	0	0	—	24
61	Haley Johnson (USA)	—	—	—	—	0	4	0	0	0	19	23
62	Elisabeth Högberg (SWE)	0	0	0	0	—	0	1	15	—	7	23
63	Elena Khrustaleva (KAZ)	0	0	3	19	—	—	—	—	0	—	22
64	Barbora Tomesova (CZE)	0	0	19	0	3	0	—	—	0	0	22
65	Tang Jiali (CHN)	0	1	2	3	0	8	—	—	0	5	19
66	Wang Chunli (CHN)	11	3	—	—	0	—	—	—	3	0	17
67	Gabriela Soukalová (CZE)	—	—	—	—	—	—	—	—	16	0	16
68	Kadri Lehtla (EST)	4	0	0	0	0	0	—	—	0	11	15
69	Xu Yinghui (CHN)	—	0	0	8	0	7	—	—	0	0	15
70	Juliane Döll (GER)	0	—	—	—	—	0	—	—	—	14	14
71	Anna Boulygina (RUS)	13	—	—	—	—	—	—	—	—	—	13
72	Laure Soulie (AND)	—	—	—	—	6	0	7	0	0	0	13
73	Ekaterina Iourieva (RUS)	—	—	—	—	—	—	0	12	—	—	12
74	Magdalena Gwizdoń (POL)	0	0	0	0	0	0	—	—	9	—	9
75	Megan Imrie (CAN)	0	0	9	0	—	—	—	—	—	—	9
76	Nadine Horchler (GER)	—	—	—	—	—	—	—	—	—	9	9
77	Diana Rasimovičiūtė (LTU)	1	—	8	0	0	0	—	—	0	0	9
78	Monika Hojnisz (POL)	0	8	—	0	—	—	—	—	0	—	8
79	Ramona Dueringer (AUT)	—	—	—	—	—	—	—	—	8	—	8
80	Olga Poltoranina (KAZ)	6	0	0	—	—	0	—	—	0	—	6
81	Nadzeya Pisareva (BLR)	0	—	—	6	0	—	—	—	0	0	6
82	Olga Nazarova (BLR)	—	—	1	—	—	—	5	0	—	—	6
83	Irina Mozhevitina (KAZ)	0	5	0	0	0	0	—	—	0	—	5
84	Itsuka Owada (JPN)	—	—	0	0	—	0	—	—	4	—	4
85	Nastassia Dubarezava (BLR)	—	0	—	0	—	0	—	—	—	1	1
86	Marine Bolliet (FRA)	—	—	—	—	1	0	—	—	—	0	1
