= 2007–08 Biathlon World Cup – World Cup 3 =

The 2007–08 Biathlon World Cup – World Cup 3 was the third event of the season and was held in Pokljuka, Slovenia, from December 13 until December 16, 2007.

== Schedule of events ==
Date	Time	Events
13 December	11:15 CET	Men's 20 km Individual
13 December	14:15 CET	Women's 15 km Individual
15 December	11:30 CET	Men's 10 km Sprint
15 December	14:15 CET	Women's 7.5 km Sprint
16 December	10:30 CET	Men's 4 x 7.5 km Relay
16 December	14:15 CET	Women's 4 x 6 km Relay

== Medal winners ==
=== Men ===
Event:	Gold:	Time	Silver:	Time	Bronze:	Time
20 km Individual details	Emil Hegle Svendsen; Norway	51:58.1 (0+0+0+0)	Alexander Wolf; Germany	52:46.7 (0+0+0+1)	Serguei Sednev; Ukraine	53:54.0 (0+0+0+1)
10 km Sprint details	Ole Einar Bjørndalen; Norway	23:44.5 (0+1)	Dmitri Yaroshenko; Russia	23:49.3 (0+1)	Mattias Nilsson; Sweden	23:56.2 (0+0)
4 x 7.5 km Relay details	Russia; Andrei Makoveev; Maxim Tchoudov; Dmitri Yaroshenko; Nikolay Kruglov Jr.	1:16:58.1 (0+0) (0+0) (0+0) (0+2) (0+1) (0+0) (0+0) (0+0)	Germany; Michael Rösch; Alexander Wolf; Andreas Birnbacher; Michael Greis	1:19:33.1 (0+0) (0+3) (0+1) (0+0) (0+0) (1+3) (0+1) (0+3)	Austria; Daniel Mesotitsch; Friedrich Pinter; Dominik Landertinger; Simon Eder	1:20:09.5 (0+1) (0+3) (0+1) (0+3) (0+3) (0+2) (0+3) (0+0)

=== Women ===
Event:	Gold:	Time	Silver:	Time	Bronze:	Time
15 km Individual details	Ekaterina Iourieva; Russia	43:47.3 (0+0+0+0)	Michela Ponza; Italy	44:42.4 (0+0+0+0)	Martina Glagow; Germany	45:05.5 (0+1+0+0)
7.5 km Sprint details	Sandrine Bailly; France	21:32.6 (1+0)	Kaisa Mäkäräinen; Finland	21:41.8 (0+1)	Magdalena Neuner; Germany	21:53.3 (0+3)
4 x 6 km Relay details	Germany; Martina Glagow; Sabrina Buchholz; Magdalena Neuner; Andrea Henkel	1:13:52.4 (0+0) (0+1) (0+0) (0+2) (0+1) (0+1) (0+0) (0+1)	Russia; Svetlana Sleptsova; Oksana Neupokoeva; Natalia Guseva; Ekaterina Iourieva	1:14:34.9 (0+0) (0+1) (0+0) (0+0) (0+2) (0+0) (0+0) (0+0)	France; Delphyne Peretto; Marie-Laure Brunet; Sylvie Becaert; Sandrine Bailly	1:15:55.0 (0+0) (0+0) (0+0) (0+2) (0+2) (0+1) (0+0) (0+1)
