= Biathlon World Championships 2007 – Women's pursuit =

Below are the results of the 2007 Biathlon World Championships 2007 for the men's relay, which took place on 4 February 2007.

== Results ==
* P - Prone, S - Standing, T - Total penalties

| Rank | Athlete | Nation | Start behind | P1 | P2 | S1 | S2 | T | Result |
|---|---|---|---|---|---|---|---|---|---|
| 1st place, gold medalist(s) | Magdalena Neuner | (Germany) GER | 0:00 | 1 | 0 | 1 | 2 | 4 | 33:01.6 |
| 2nd place, silver medalist(s) | Linda Grubben | (Norway) NOR | 1:17 | 0 | 1 | 0 | 0 | 1 | +7.1 |
| 3rd place, bronze medalist(s) | Anna Carin Olofsson | (Sweden) SWE | 0:02 | 2 | 0 | 1 | 2 | 5 | +7.6 |
| 4 | Natalia Guseva | (Russia) RUS | 0:20 | 1 | 1 | 0 | 0 | 2 | +47.8 |
| 5 | Tadeja Brankovic | (Slovenia) SLO | 0:47 | 1 | 0 | 1 | 0 | 2 | +1:03.3 |
| 6 | Florence Baverel-Robert | (France) FRA | 1:21 | 0 | 0 | 1 | 1 | 2 | +1:22.5 |
| 7 | Teja Gregorin | (Slovenia) SLO | 0:57 | 0 | 0 | 1 | 1 | 2 | +1:24.8 |
| 8 | Michela Ponza | (Italy) ITA | 0:39 | 0 | 0 | 1 | 0 | 1 | +1:30.2 |
| 9 | Kati Wilhelm | (Germany) GER | 0:45 | 1 | 2 | 1 | 1 | 5 | +1:34.7 |
| 10 | Andrea Henkel | (Germany) GER | 1:24 | 2 | 1 | 1 | 0 | 4 | +1:46.9 |
| 11 | Martina Glagow | (Germany) GER | 2:05 | 0 | 1 | 0 | 1 | 2 | +1:59.0 |
| 12 | Olga Kudrashova | (Belarus) BLR | 1:19 | 0 | 2 | 1 | 1 | 4 | +2:03.5 |
| 13 | Oksana Khvostenko | (Ukraine) UKR | 1:12 | 0 | 1 | 1 | 1 | 3 | +2:14.9 |
| 14 | Olena Petrova | (Ukraine) UKR | 1:13 | 0 | 0 | 1 | 1 | 2 | +2:16.4 |
| 15 | Helena Jonsson | (Sweden) SWE | 0:30 | 1 | 0 | 2 | 1 | 4 | +2:26.6 |
| 16 | Andreja Mali | (Slovenia) SLO | 1:32 | 0 | 0 | 1 | 1 | 2 | +2:27.8 |
| 17 | Magdalena Gwizdon | (Poland) POL | 1:09 | 0 | 1 | 0 | 3 | 4 | +2:29.3 |
| 18 | Zina Kocher | (Canada) CAN | 1:54 | 0 | 1 | 0 | 0 | 1 | +2:34.2 |
| 19 | Tora Berger | (Norway) NOR | 0:53 | 2 | 1 | 2 | 1 | 6 | +2:43.4 |
| 20 | Vita Semerenko | (Ukraine) UKR | 1:05 | 0 | 2 | 0 | 1 | 3 | +2:46.8 |
| 21 | Krystyna Pałka | (Poland) POL | 1:58 | 1 | 0 | 0 | 0 | 1 | +2:48.7 |
| 22 | Darya Domracheva | (Belarus) BLR | 1:06 | 3 | 0 | 1 | 2 | 6 | +2:50.6 |
| 23 | Eveli Saue | (Estonia) EST | 1:10 | 1 | 1 | 0 | 1 | 3 | +2:57.5 |
| 24 | Ann Kristin Flatland | (Norway) NOR | 0:39 | 1 | 0 | 1 | 1 | 3 | +3:07.4 |
| 25 | Kaisa Mäkäräinen | (Finland) FIN | 1:44 | 0 | 2 | 0 | 1 | 3 | +3:13.0 |
| 26 | Delphine Peretto | (France) FRA | 1:40 | 1 | 2 | 1 | 0 | 4 | +3:14.6 |
| 27 | Martina Halinarova | (Slovakia) SVK | 2:30 | 1 | 0 | 0 | 0 | 1 | +3:15.4 |
| 28 | Tatiana Moiseeva | (Russia) RUS | 2:31 | 0 | 1 | 1 | 1 | 3 | +3:28.4 |
| 29 | Anna Boulygina | (Russia) RUS | 1:18 | 1 | 2 | 3 | 1 | 7 | +3:29.2 |
| 30 | Sandrine Bailly | (France) FRA | 0:50 | 1 | 1 | 4 | 1 | 7 | +3:36.0 |
| 31 | Sylvie Becaert | (France) FRA | 1:37 | 1 | 1 | 1 | 2 | 5 | +3:53.3 |
| 32 | Diana Rasimovičiūtė | (Lithuania) LTU | 1:53 | 3 | 2 | 1 | 1 | 7 | +3:59.8 |
| 33 | Sofia Domeij | (Sweden) SWE | 1:24 | 1 | 0 | 4 | 1 | 6 | +4:01.0 |
| 34 | Zdenka Vejnarova | (Czech Republic) CZE | 2:10 | 1 | 0 | 2 | 0 | 3 | +4:04.4 |
| 35 | Nina Lemesh | (Ukraine) UKR | 2:29 | 1 | 0 | 1 | 1 | 3 | +4:23.1 |
| 36 | Katarzyna Ponikwia | (Poland) POL | 1:49 | 0 | 0 | 1 | 1 | 2 | +4:26.4 |
| 37 | Pauline Macabies | (France) FRA | 2:22 | 1 | 1 | 0 | 3 | 5 | +4:36.7 |
| 38 | Tracy Barnes | United States | 2:21 | 1 | 0 | 1 | 1 | 3 | +4:38.4 |
| 39 | Éva Tófalvi | (Romania) ROU | 1:53 | 1 | 1 | 1 | 2 | 5 | +4:43.7 |
| 40 | Katja Haller | (Italy) ITA | 2:16 | 3 | 0 | 0 | 1 | 4 | +4:45.9 |
| 41 | Natalya Sokolova | (Belarus) BLR | 2:01 | 1 | 1 | 2 | 3 | 7 | +4:59.7 |
| 42 | Gunn Margit Andreassen | (Norway) NOR | 2:58 | 1 | 0 | 2 | 0 | 3 | +5:06.0 |
| 43 | Irina Malgina | (Russia) RUS | 2:18 | 0 | 2 | 2 | 2 | 6 | +5:06.2 |
| 44 | Sandra Keith | (Canada) CAN | 2:47 | 0 | 1 | 0 | 0 | 1 | +5:18.1 |
| 45 | Dana Plotogea | (Romania) ROU | 1:33 | 0 | 2 | 2 | 2 | 6 | +5:57.5 |
| 46 | Karin Oberhofer | (Italy) ITA | 2:30 | 1 | 0 | 0 | 1 | 2 | +5:58.9 |
| 47 | Liudmila Kalinchik | (Belarus) BLR | 2:56 | 1 | 0 | 2 | 2 | 5 | +5:59.0 |
| 48 | Madara Liduma | (Latvia) LAT | 1:39 | 2 | 1 | 2 | 4 | 9 | +5:59.3 |
| 49 | Lanny Barnes | United States | 2:19 | 1 | 0 | 2 | 3 | 6 | +6:02.9 |
| 50 | Nathalie Santer-Bjoerndalen | (Belgium) BEL | 3:06 | 3 | 0 | 3 | 1 | 7 | +6:28.8 |
| 51 | Sona Mihokova | (Slovakia) SVK | 2:49 | 1 | 2 | 1 | 0 | 4 | +6:28.9 |
| 52 | Dijana Grudicek | (Slovenia) SLO | 3:15 | 1 | 1 | 1 | 2 | 5 | +6:37.0 |
| 53 | Nina Kadeva | (Bulgaria) BUL | 3:10 | 0 | 0 | 2 | 2 | 4 | +7:14.6 |
| 54 | Tagne Tahe | (Estonia) EST | 2:49 | 2 | 0 | 0 | 3 | 5 | +7:34.1 |

Did not start:

- Johanna Holma, (Sweden) SWE
- Liming Liu, (China) CHN
- Magda Rezlerova, (Czech Republic) CZE

Lapped:

- Mari Laukkanen, (Finland) FIN
- Zuzana Tryznova, (Czech Republic) CZE
- Sarah Konrad, United States

Jury decisions:

- Time adjustment: Teja Gregorin, (Slovenia) SLO -10.0
