= 2007–08 Biathlon World Cup – World Cup 1 =

The 2007–08 Biathlon World Cup – World Cup 1 was the opening event of the season and was held in Kontiolahti, Finland, from November 29 until December 2, 2007.

== Schedule of events ==
Date	Time	Events
November 29	11:30 CET	Women's 15 km Individual
November 29	14:30 CET	Men's 20 km Individual
November 30	14:45 CET	Women's 7.5 km Sprint
December 1	14:45 CET	Men's 10 km Sprint
December 2	12:00 CET	Women's 10 km Pursuit
December 2	14:45 CET	Men's 12.5 km Pursuit

== Medal winners ==
=== Men ===
Event:	Gold:	Time	Silver:	Time	Bronze:	Time
20 km Individual details	Vincent Defrasne; France	51:25.2 (0+0+0+0)	Halvard Hanevold; Norway	51:48.8 (0+1+0+0)	Maxim Tchoudov; Russia	51:55.4 (0+0+1+0)
10 km Sprint details	Ole Einar Bjørndalen; Norway	23:13.4 (0+0)	Dmitri Yaroshenko; Russia	23:26.1 (1+0)	Carsten Pump; Germany	23:36.7 (0+0)
12.5 km Pursuit details	Ivan Tcherezov; Russia	32:52.0 (0+0+0+0)	Ole Einar Bjørndalen; Norway	33:19.7 (1+1+0+2)	Dmitri Yaroshenko; Russia	33:52.5 (0+0+0+3)

=== Women ===
Event:	Gold:	Time	Silver:	Time	Bronze:	Time
15 km Individual details	Martina Glagow; Germany	46:28.8 (0+0+0+0)	Tatiana Moiseeva; Russia	46:35.5 (0+0+0+0)	Simone Hauswald; Germany	47:31.5 (0+1+0+1)
7.5 km Sprint details	Martina Glagow; Germany	21:24.1 (0+0)	Kati Wilhelm; Germany	21:24.4 (1+0)	Tora Berger; Norway	21:24.7 (0+0)
10 km Pursuit details	Tora Berger; Norway	31:59.7 (0+0+0+1)	Andrea Henkel; Germany	32:18.5 (0+0+2+0)	Martina Glagow; Germany	32:42.2 (0+0+1+0)
