= Biathlon World Championships 2007 – Women's sprint =

Women's sprint at the Biathlon World Championships 2007
- Location: Antholz-Anterselva, Italy
- Date: 3 February
- Competitors: 85 from 27 nations
- Winning time: 22:46.9

Medalists
| gold medal | Magdalena Neuner | Germany |
| silver medal | Anna Carin Olofsson | Sweden |
| bronze medal | Natalia Guseva | Russia |

The women's sprint competition at the Biathlon World Championships 2007 was held on 3 February 2007.

== Results ==
The race was started at 14:15.

| Rank | Bib | Name | Nationality | Penalties (P+S) | Time | Deficit |
|---|---|---|---|---|---|---|
| 1st place, gold medalist(s) | 7 | Magdalena Neuner | Germany | 2 (1+1) | 22:46.9 | |
| 2nd place, silver medalist(s) | 13 | Anna Carin Olofsson | Sweden | 2 (1+1) | 22:49.2 | +2.3 |
| 3rd place, bronze medalist(s) | 50 | Natalia Guseva | Russia | 1 (0+1) | 23:06.5 | +19.6 |
| 4 | 4 | Helena Jonsson | Sweden | 0 (0+0) | 23:16.5 | +29.6 |
| 5 | 70 | Ann Kristin Flatland | Norway | 0 (0+0) | 23:25.6 | +38.7 |
| 6 | 64 | Michela Ponza | Italy | 0 (0+0) | 23:26.1 | +39.2 |
| 7 | 15 | Kati Wilhelm | Germany | 3 (2+1) | 23:32.0 | +45.1 |
| 8 | 11 | Tadeja Brankovič | Slovenia | 1 (0+1) | 23:33.8 | +46.9 |
| 9 | 60 | Sandrine Bailly | France | 2 (2+0) | 23:36.5 | +49.6 |
| 10 | 5 | Tora Berger | Norway | 2 (1+1) | 23:40.3 | +53.4 |
| 11 | 8 | Teja Gregorin | Slovenia | 2 (0+2) | 23:44.3 | +57.4 |
| 12 | 43 | Vita Semerenko | Ukraine | 1 (0+1) | 23:51.9 | +1:05.0 |
| 13 | 37 | Darya Domracheva | Belarus | 3 (1+2) | 23:52.9 | +1:06.0 |
| 14 | 6 | Magdalena Gwizdoń | Poland | 2 (0+2) | 23:56.2 | +1:09.3 |
| 15 | 47 | Eveli Saue | Estonia | 1 (0+1) | 23:57.3 | +1:10.4 |
| 16 | 16 | Oksana Khvostenko | Ukraine | 1 (0+1) | 23:58.8 | +1:11.9 |
| 17 | 53 | Olena Petrova | Ukraine | 1 (0+1) | 24:00.3 | +1:13.4 |
| 18 | 9 | Linda Grubben | Norway | 3 (0+3) | 24:03.9 | +1:17.0 |
| 19 | 55 | Anna Boulygina | Russia | 3 (1+2) | 24:04.4 | +1:17.5 |
| 20 | 29 | Olga Kudrashova | Belarus | 2 (2+0) | 24:05.6 | +1:18.7 |
| 21 | 66 | Florence Baverel-Robert | France | 2 (0+2) | 24:07.6 | +1:20.7 |
| 22 | 48 | Sofia Domeij | Sweden | 2 (1+1) | 24:10.5 | +1:23.6 |
| 23 | 2 | Andrea Henkel | Germany | 3 (2+1) | 24:11.0 | +1:24.1 |
| 24 | 61 | Andreja Mali | Slovenia | 1 (1+0) | 24:18.8 | +1:31.9 |
| 25 | 63 | Dana Plotogea | Romania | 1 (0+1) | 24:20.0 | +1:33.1 |
| 26 | 45 | Sylvie Becaert | France | 2 (0+2) | 24:24.3 | +1:37.4 |
| 27 | 35 | Madara Līduma | Latvia | 2 (0+2) | 24:25.7 | +1:38.8 |
| 28 | 73 | Delphyne Peretto | France | 2 (0+2) | 24:27.2 | +1:40.3 |
| 29 | 1 | Kaisa Mäkäräinen | Finland | 2 (0+2) | 24:30.8 | +1:43.9 |
| 30 | 69 | Katarzyna Ponikwia | Poland | 0 (0+0) | 24:35.9 | +1:49.0 |
| 31 | 41 | Diana Rasimovičiūtė | Lithuania | 4 (4+0) | 24:39.7 | +1:52.8 |
| 32 | 33 | Éva Tófalvi | Romania | 1 (0+1) | 24:39.8 | +1:52.9 |
| 33 | 12 | Zina Kocher | Canada | 3 (1+2) | 24:40.8 | +1:53.9 |
| 34 | 20 | Krystyna Pałka | Poland | 2 (2+0) | 24:44.5 | +1:57.6 |
| 35 | 14 | Natalya Sokolova | Belarus | 4 (1+3) | 24:47.5 | +2:00.6 |
| 36 | 30 | Martina Glagow | Germany | 3 (2+1) | 24:52.3 | +2:05.4 |
| 37 | 17 | Zdeňka Vejnarová | Czech Republic | 3 (2+1) | 24:56.9 | +2:10.0 |
| 38 | 71 | Katja Haller | Italy | 3 (2+1) | 25:03.2 | +2:16.3 |
| 39 | 3 | Irina Malgina | Russia | 3 (1+2) | 25:04.4 | +2:17.5 |
| 40 | 49 | Lanny Barnes | United States | 1 (0+1) | 25:05.5 | +2:18.6 |
| 41 | 36 | Tracy Barnes | United States | 1 (1+0) | 25:07.6 | +2:20.7 |
| 42 | 57 | Johanna Holma | Sweden | 4 (0+4) | 25:08.3 | +2:21.4 |
| 43 | 26 | Mari Laukkanen | Finland | 1 (0+1) | 25:08.5 | +2:21.6 |
| 44 | 19 | Pauline Macabies | France | 2 (1+1) | 25:08.7 | +2:21.8 |
| 45 | 86 | Nina Lemesh | Ukraine | 3 (2+1) | 25:15.5 | +2:28.6 |
| 46 | 27 | Martina Halinárová | Slovakia | 2 (1+1) | 25:16.5 | +2:29.6 |
| 47 | 75 | Karin Oberhofer | Italy | 1 (1+0) | 25:16.8 | +2:29.9 |
| 48 | 10 | Tatiana Moiseeva | Russia | 4 (1+3) | 25:18.2 | +2:31.3 |
| 49 | 59 | Zuzana Tryznová | Czech Republic | 2 (1+1) | 25:21.7 | +2:34.8 |
| 50 | 52 | Liu Liming | China | 2 (0+2) | 25:33.1 | +2:46.2 |
| 51 | 32 | Sandra Keith | Canada | 2 (0+2) | 25:34.0 | +2:47.1 |
| 52 | 67 | Tagne Tähe | Estonia | 2 (0+2) | 25:35.4 | +2:48.5 |
| 53 | 28 | Soňa Mihoková | Slovakia | 2 (1+1) | 25:36.3 | +2:49.4 |
| 54 | 56 | Sarah Konrad | United States | 4 (2+2) | 25:38.5 | +2:51.6 |
| 55 | 68 | Liudmila Kalinchik | Belarus | 4 (2+2) | 25:42.4 | +2:55.5 |
| 56 | 18 | Gunn Margit Andreassen | Norway | 4 (3+1) | 25:44.5 | +2:57.6 |
| 57 | 25 | Nathalie Santer-Bjørndalen | Belgium | 5 (2+3) | 25:53.3 | +3:06.4 |
| 58 | 46 | Magda Rezlerová | Czech Republic | 5 (2+3) | 25:54.2 | +3:07.3 |
| 59 | 72 | Nina Kadeva | Bulgaria | 3 (1+2) | 25:57.3 | +3:10.4 |
| 60 | 34 | Dijana Grudiček | Slovenia | 3 (2+1) | 26:02.0 | +3:15.1 |
| 61 | 42 | Roberta Fiandino | Italy | 4 (1+3) | 26:12.3 | +3:25.4 |
| 61 | 79 | Sonya Erasmus | Canada | 2 (0+2) | 26:12.3 | +3:25.4 |
| 63 | 54 | Marie-Pierre Parent | Canada | 2 (0+2) | 26:12.6 | +3:25.7 |
| 64 | 38 | Pavlina Filipova | Bulgaria | 4 (1+3) | 26:13.9 | +3:27.0 |
| 65 | 58 | Pirjo Urpilainen | Finland | 2 (1+1) | 26:20.3 | +3:33.4 |
| 66 | 65 | Jana Gerekova | Slovakia | 3 (2+1) | 26:26.2 | +3:39.3 |
| 67 | 31 | Emma Fowler | Great Britain | 2 (0+2) | 26:37.0 | +3:50.1 |
| 68 | 81 | Magdalena Nykiel | Poland | 4 (0+4) | 26:37.8 | +3:50.9 |
| 69 | 51 | Jia Yuping | China | 6 (2+4) | 26:41.9 | +3:55.0 |
| 70 | 76 | Mihaela Purdea | Romania | 4 (0+4) | 26:42.8 | +3:55.9 |
| 71 | 39 | Selina Gasparin | Switzerland | 5 (3+2) | 26:44.9 | +3:58.0 |
| 72 | 80 | Susanna Porela | Finland | 3 (1+2) | 26:45.9 | +3:59.0 |
| 73 | 84 | Radka Popova | Bulgaria | 2 (1+1) | 26:47.3 | +4:00.4 |
| 74 | 62 | Gerda Krūmiņa | Latvia | 5 (1+4) | 26:51.7 | +4:04.8 |
| 75 | 21 | Irina Nikoultchina | Bulgaria | 7 (4+3) | 26:56.5 | +4:09.6 |
| 76 | 78 | Ľubomíra Kalinová | Slovakia | 7 (4+3) | 27:06.8 | +4:19.9 |
| 77 | 24 | Sirli Hanni | Estonia | 4 (3+1) | 27:09.3 | +4:22.4 |
| 78 | 77 | Triin Peips | Estonia | 3 (2+1) | 27:13.2 | +4:26.3 |
| 79 | 74 | Līga Glāzere | Latvia | 4 (2+2) | 27:15.6 | +4:28.7 |
| 80 | 83 | Alexandra Rusu | Romania | 3 (1+2) | 27:26.7 | +4:39.8 |
| 81 | 22 | Elena Gorohova | Moldova | 2 (1+1) | 27:31.4 | +4:44.5 |
| 82 | 23 | Aleksandra Vasiljević | Bosnia and Herzegovina | 3 (2+1) | 28:11.1 | +5:24.2 |
| 83 | 85 | Carolyn Treacy Bramante | United States | 5 (0+5) | 29:01.1 | +6:14.2 |
| 84 | 44 | Uiloq Slettemark | Greenland | 4 (1+3) | 29:21.1 | +6:34.2 |
| | 17 | Lenka Munclingerová | Czech Republic | 5 (3+2) | Did not finish | |
| | 92 | Andrijana Stipaničić | Croatia | Did not start | | |
