= Daniel Graf (biathlete) =

German biathlete

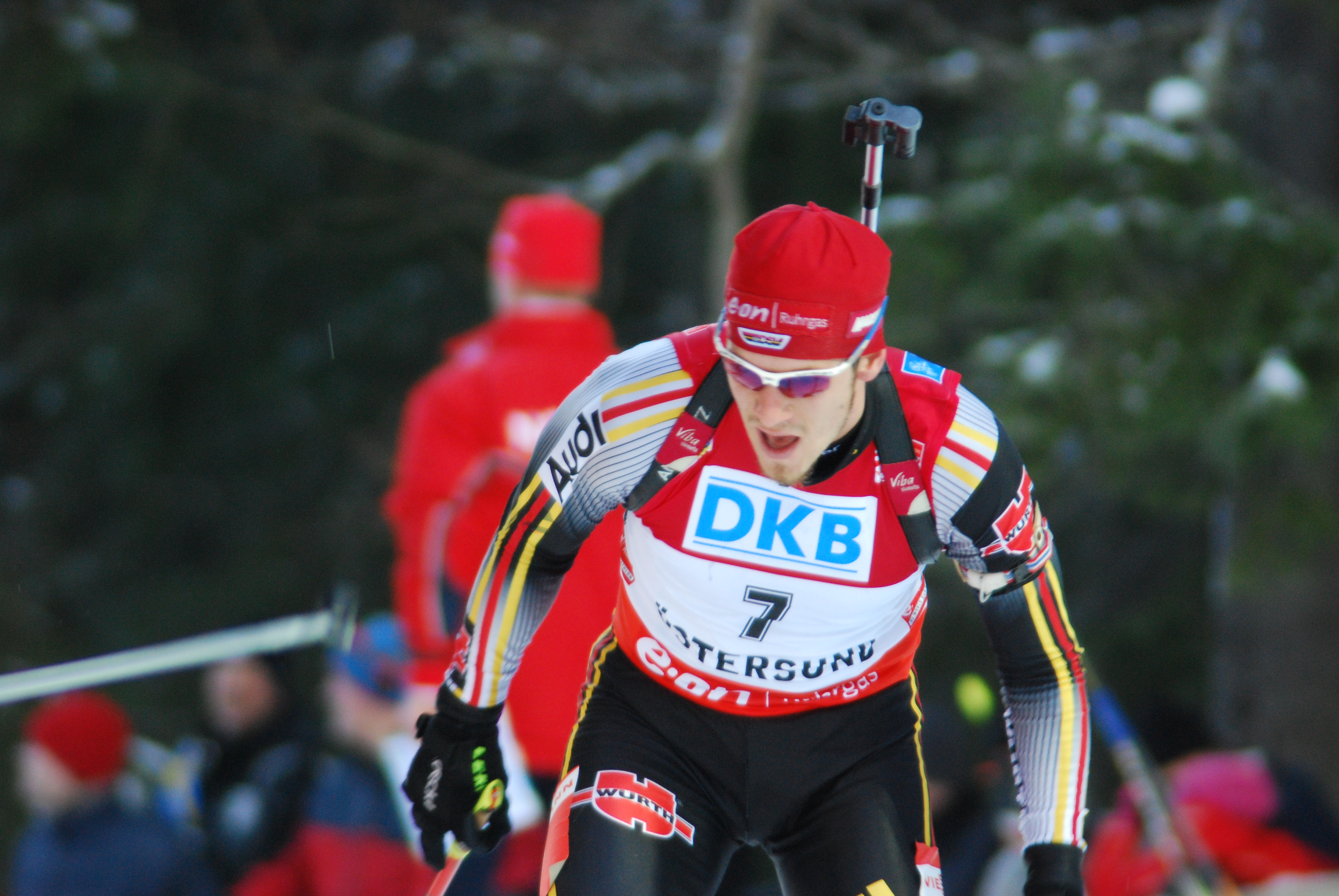

Personal information
- Born: 7 September 1981 (age 44) Arnstadt, East Germany

Sport

Professional information
- Club: TSV Siegsdorf

World Cup
- Individual podiums: 2
- All podiums: 5
Medal record
Men's biathlon
Representing Germany
Junior World Championships
Gold medal – first place	2000 Hochfilzen	4 × 7.5 km relay
Gold medal – first place	2001 Khanty-Mansiysk	4 × 7.5 km relay
Bronze medal – third place	1999 Pokljuka	4 × 7.5 km relay
Bronze medal – third place	2000 Hochfilzen	10 km sprint
Bronze medal – third place	2001 Khanty-Mansiysk	10 km sprint

Daniel Graf (born 7 September 1981) is a former German biathlete. He competes in the Biathlon World Cup.

== Biathlon results ==
All results are sourced from the International Biathlon Union.

=== World Championships ===
Event	Individual	Sprint	Pursuit	Mass start	Relay	Mixed relay
(Austria) 2005 Hochfilzen	19th	—	—	17th	—	—
(Sweden) 2008 Östersund	33rd	7th	19th	17th	—	—

=== World Cup ===
Season	Overall		Individual		Sprint		Pursuit		Mass start	
Season	Points	Position	Points	Position	Points	Position	Points	Position	Points	Position
2004–05	219	22nd	35	23rd	80	25th	70	23rd	34	26th
2005–06	52	55th	0	—	31	45th	21	50th	0	—
2006–07	43	54th	0	—	22	46th	21	38th	0	—
2007-08	444	13th	37	20th	184	8th	115	17th	102	11th
2008-09	18	85th	18	58th	0	—	0	—	0	—
2009-10	11	102nd	0	—	11	83rd	0	—	0	—
2010-11	injured: did not compete									
2011-12	62	62nd	0	—	27	66th	35	50th	0	—

==== Podiums ====
Season	Place	Competition	Placement
2004–05	(Germany) Oberhof	Relay	2nd
2004–05	(Italy) Cesana San Sicario	Relay	3rd
2007–08	(Austria) Hochfilzen	Pursuit	3rd
2007–08	(Austria) Hochfilzen	Relay	3rd
2007–08	(Russia) Khanty-Mansiysk	Mass Start	2nd

*Results are from IBU races which include the Biathlon World Cup, Biathlon World Championships and the Winter Olympic Games.

Updated on 17 January 2019
