= Solveig Rogstad =

Norwegian biathlete (born 1982)

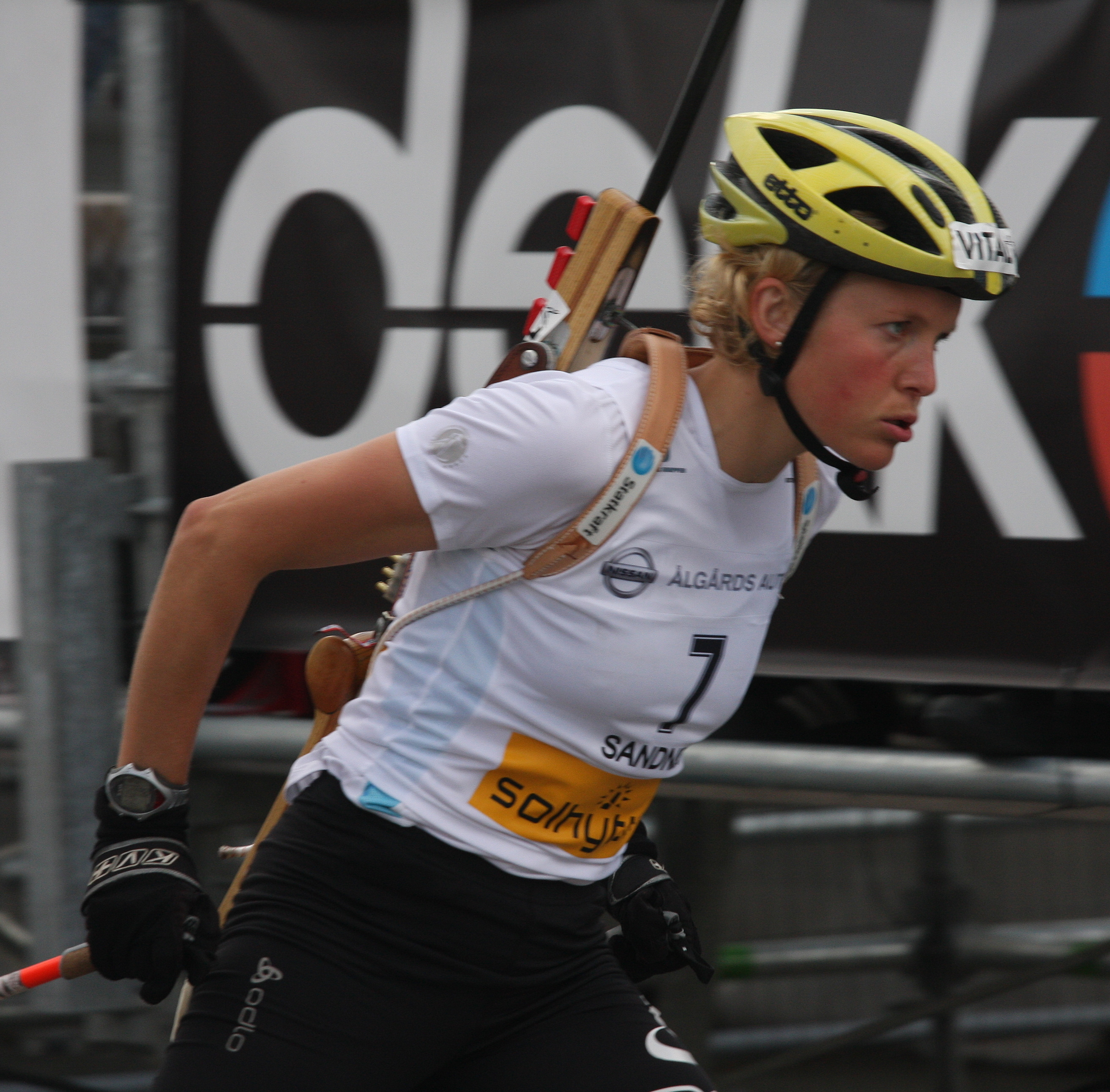

Personal information
- Full name: Solveig Rogstad
- Born: 31 July 1982 (age 43) Valdres, Norway
- Height: 1.85 m (6 ft 1 in)

Sport

Professional information
- Sport: Biathlon
- Club: SV Union Frojach
- World Cup debut: 16 December 2004
- Retired: 4 November 2011

Olympic Games
- Teams: 1 (2010)
- Medals: 0

World Championships
- Teams: 2 (2008, 2009)
- Medals: 0

World Cup
- Seasons: 6 (2004/05, 2006/07–2010/11)
- Individual races: 49
- All races: 61
- Individual victories: 1
- All victories: 3
- Individual podiums: 2
- All podiums: 6

Solveig Rogstad (born 31 July 1982) is a retired Norwegian biathlete.
