= Olga Anisimova =

Russian biathlete

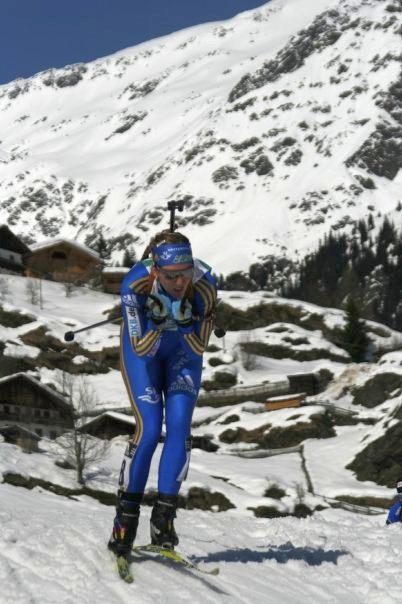

Personal information
- Full name: Olga Viktorovna Anisimova
- Born: 29 January 1972 (age 54) Balakovo, USSR

Sport

Professional information
- Sport: Biathlon
- World Cup debut: 19 December 1991
- Retired: 2010

World Championships
- Teams: 2 (2006, 2007)

World Cup
- Seasons: 9 (1991/92, 1993/94, 1995/96, 2001/02, 2004/05–2008/09)
- All victories: 2
- Individual podiums: 1
- All podiums: 5

Olga Anisimova (Russian Ольга Викторовна Анисимова; born 29 January 1972) is a former Russian biathlete.

== Career ==
Anisimova started her career competing for the USSR at the Biathlon Youth and Junior World Championships between 1988 and 1991. Her Biathlon World Cup debut came during the 1991-92 Biathlon World Cup season in the individual in Hochfilzen, Austria. She competed during the 1993-94 Biathlon World Cup season. However, she was out of the A-Team following the 1995-96 Biathlon World Cup season, making a comeback a decade later during the 2006-07 Biathlon World Cup season.

She made her way back into the Russian A-Team thanks to great results in the European Cup when she won the overall title during the 2005–06 season. At the 2004 Biathlon Open European Championships in Minsk, Belarus, she won a gold medal with the Russian relay. Two years later in Arber, Germany, she won two silver medals in the sprint and pursuit.

Her best ever result in the World Cup came during the 2007-08 Biathlon World Cup where, at the age of 35, she finished second in the Oberhof, Germany mass start, behind Magdalena Neuner. Her best finish in the overall came a season earlier when she finished 21st.

=== World Championships ===
Event	Individual	Sprint	Pursuit	Mass start	Team	Relay	Mixed relay
(Slovenia) 2006 Pokljuka	—N/a	—N/a	—N/a	—N/a	—N/a	—N/a	16th
(Italy) 2007 Antholz-Anterselva	43rd	—	—	—	—N/a	7th	—

*During Olympic seasons competitions are only held for those events not included in the Olympic program.
**Team was removed as an event in 1998, and pursuit was added in 1997 with mass start being added in 1999 and the mixed relay in 2005.
