= Carsten Pump =

German biathlete

Personal information
- Full name: Carsten Pump
- Born: 30 September 1976 (age 49) Dresden, East Germany

Sport

Professional information
- Sport: Biathlon
- World Cup debut: 5 December 2002
- Retired: 2010

World Cup
- Seasons: 6 (2002/03–2007/08)
- Individual podiums: 1
- All podiums: 3

Carsten Pump (born 30 September 1976) is a former German biathlete.

Pump made his Biathlon World Cup debut during the 2002-03 Biathlon World Cup season when he finished 26th in the opening sprint race of the season in Östersund, Sweden. In the following few years, he was mainly a member of the German B-Team, competing mostly in the European Cup with occasional starts among the elite. Pump won the overall title for the best athlete in the European Cup during the 2004–05 season, along with discipline titles for spring and pursuit. His best ever results in the World Cup was a third place in the Kontiolahti, Finland sprint at the beginning of the 2007-08 Biathlon World Cup season. His best finish overall came in the same season when he finished 34th.

He never got to compete at the Biathlon World Championships or the Winter Olympics. However, he was very successful at the Biathlon Open European Championships. In 2003, he won a bronze medal in the sprint event and gold in the German relay in Forni Avoltri, Italy. Two years later in Novosibirsk, Russia, he won three medals: gold in the individual, silver in the pursuit and bronze with the relay. In 2006 in Arber, Germany, he won another bronze medal in the sprint. While the 2007 Championships in Bansko, Bulgaria were a disappointment for Pump because he did not win a single medal in the individual races, he was still able to win gold with the relay.

He retired in 2010 after not being selected for the 2010 Winter Olympics in Vancouver, Canada.
