= Anna Carin Zidek =

Swedish biathlete

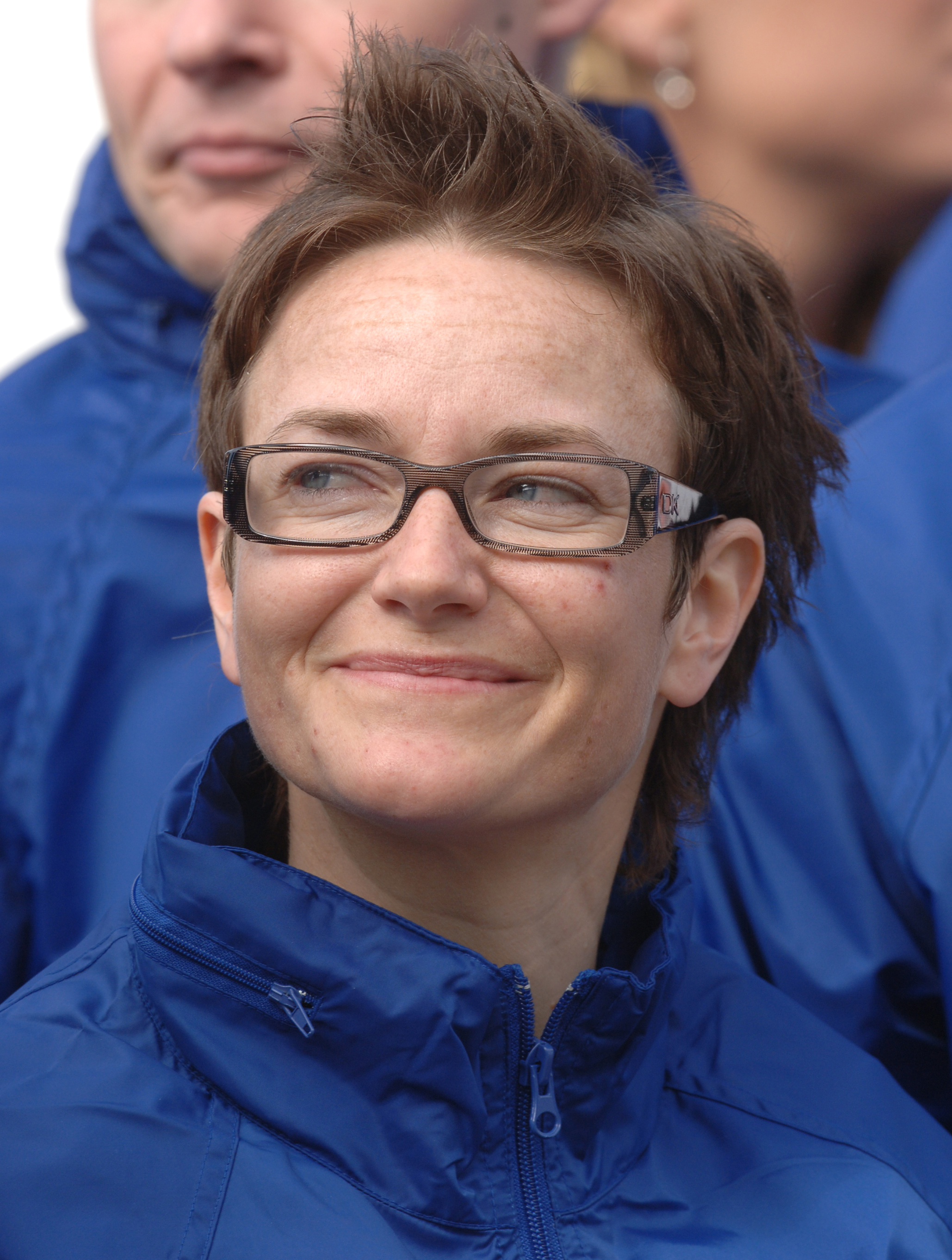
- Anna Carin Olofsson at Olympiatravet in April 2006

Personal information
- Full name: Anna Carin Helena Cecilia Zidek
- Nickname: ACO
- Nationality: Swedish
- Born: Anna Carin Olofsson; 1 April 1973 (age 53) Sveg, Sweden
- Years active: 2002-2011
- Height: 159 cm (5 ft 3 in)
- Weight: 55 kg (121 lb)

Sport

Professional information
- Club: Lillhärdals IF
- Skis: Madshus
- Rifle: Anschütz
- IBU Cup debut: 30 November 2002
- World Cup debut: 5 December 2002
- Retired: 19 March 2012

Olympic Games
- Teams: 3 (2002, 2006, 2010)
- Medals: 2 (1 gold)

World Championships
- Teams: 9
- Medals: 6 (1 gold)

World Cup
- Seasons: 9
- Individual races: 201
- All races: 233
- Individual victories: 12
- All victories: 16
- Individual podiums: 30
- All podiums: 40
- Discipline titles: 2 (SP 06/07, IN 09/10)
Medal record
Women's biathlon
Representing Sweden
International biathlon competitions
Event	1st	2nd	3rd
Olympic Games	1	1	0
World Championships	1	3	2
Total	2	4	2
Olympic Games
Gold medal – first place	2006 Turin	12.5 km mass start
Silver medal – second place	2006 Turin	7.5 km sprint
World Championships
Gold medal – first place	2007; Antholz-Anterselva	Mixed relay
Silver medal – second place	2005 Hochfilzen	12.5 km mass start
Silver medal – second place	2007; Antholz-Anterselva	7.5 km sprint
Silver medal – second place	2009 Pyeongchang	Mixed relay
Bronze medal – third place	2007; Antholz-Anterselva	10 km pursuit
Bronze medal – third place	2010; Khanty-Mansiysk	Mixed relay
Women's cross-country skiing
Junior World Championships
Silver medal – second place	1993 Harrachov	4 × 5 km relay
- Updated on 12 January 2018

Anna Carin Helena Cecilia Zidek (née Olofsson, born 1 April 1973) is a Swedish former biathlete who won a silver medal in the 7.5 km sprint and a gold medal in the 12.5 km mass start event at the 2006 Winter Olympics. Originally a cross-country skier, Olofsson competed at the 2002 Winter Olympics, but in the three events she took part in she made the top 30 only once (15 km freestyle), and the following season she switched to biathlon.

On 3 May 2008 Olofsson married her then boyfriend, Tom Zidek, a serviceman in the Canadian biathlon team, in a ceremony near Canmore, Canada. Olofsson officially announced her retirement on 16 July 2011.

== Biathlon World Cup placings ==
Place	Individual	Sprint	Pursuit	Mass start	Relay	Mixed relay	Total
1st	2	6	2	2	2	2	16
2nd	3	4	2	2	2	1	14
3rd		3	4		2	1	10
Podium	5	13	8	4	6	4	40
4th-10th	9	21	17	8	15	3	73
Top 10	14	34	25	12	21	7	113

(Retired 16 July 2011)

== Cross-country skiing results ==
All results are sourced from the International Ski Federation (FIS).

Anna Carin Zidek
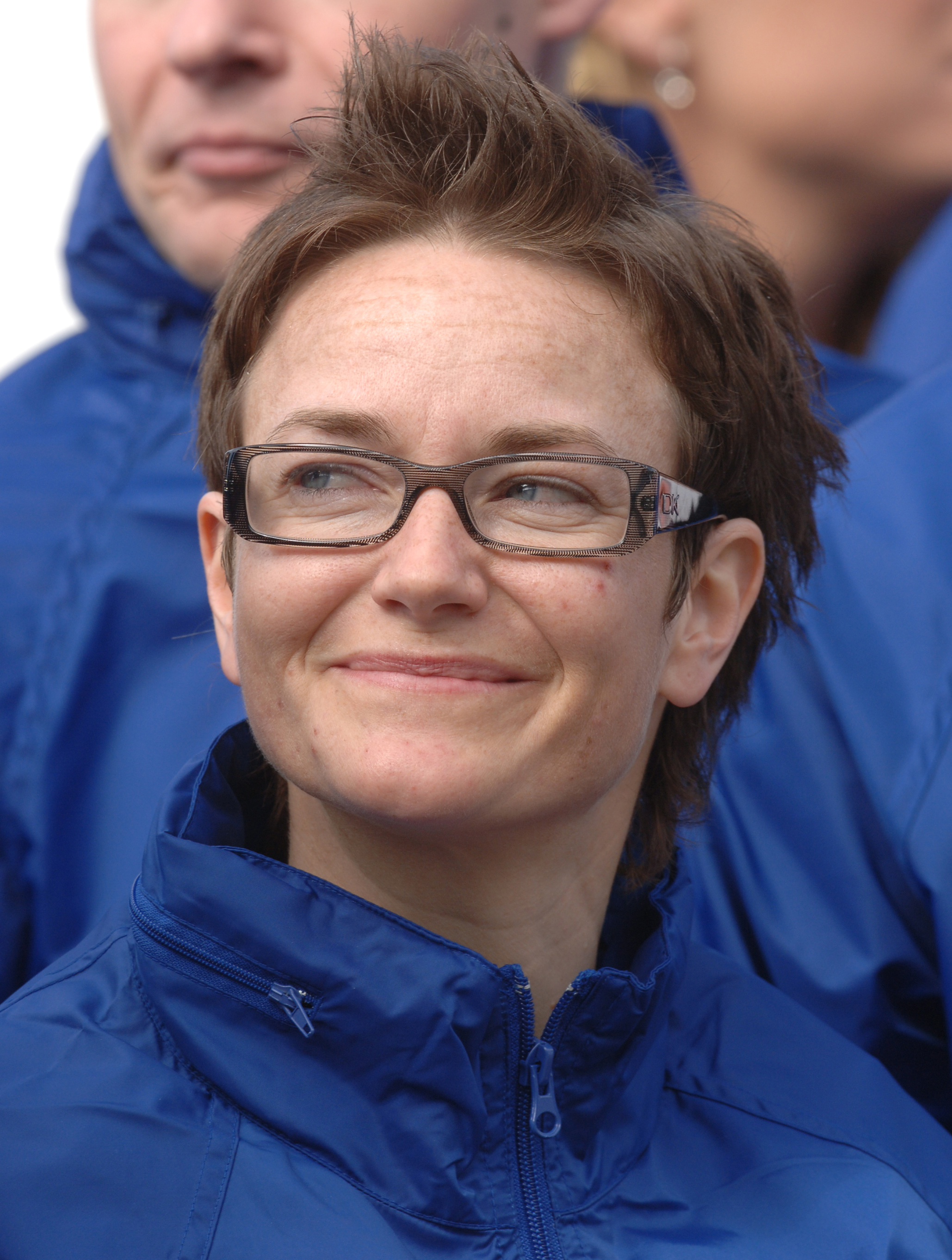

Sport
- Sport: Skiing

World Cup career
- Seasons: 9 – (1994–2002)
- Indiv. starts: 34
- Indiv. podiums: 0
- Team starts: 7
- Team podiums: 0
- Overall titles: 0 – (55th in 1999)
- Discipline titles: 0
Medal record
Women's cross-country skiing
Representing Sweden
Junior World Championships
Silver medal – second place	1993 Harrachov	4 × 5 km relay

=== Olympic Games ===
Year	Age	10 km	15 km	Pursuit	30 km	Sprint	4 × 5 km relay
2002	28	—	30	46	DNF	37	—

=== World Cup ===
==== Season standings ====
Season	Age				
Season	Age	Overall	Long Distance	Middle Distance	Sprint
1994	20	NC	—N/a	—N/a	—N/a
1995	21	NC	—N/a	—N/a	—N/a
1996	22	NC	—N/a	—N/a	—N/a
1997	23	NC	NC	—N/a	—
1998	24	NC	NC	—N/a	—
1999	25	55	NC	—N/a	52
2000	26	NC	NC	NC	NC
2001	27	NC	—N/a	—N/a	—
2002	28	NC	—N/a	—N/a	—
