= Pauline Macabies =

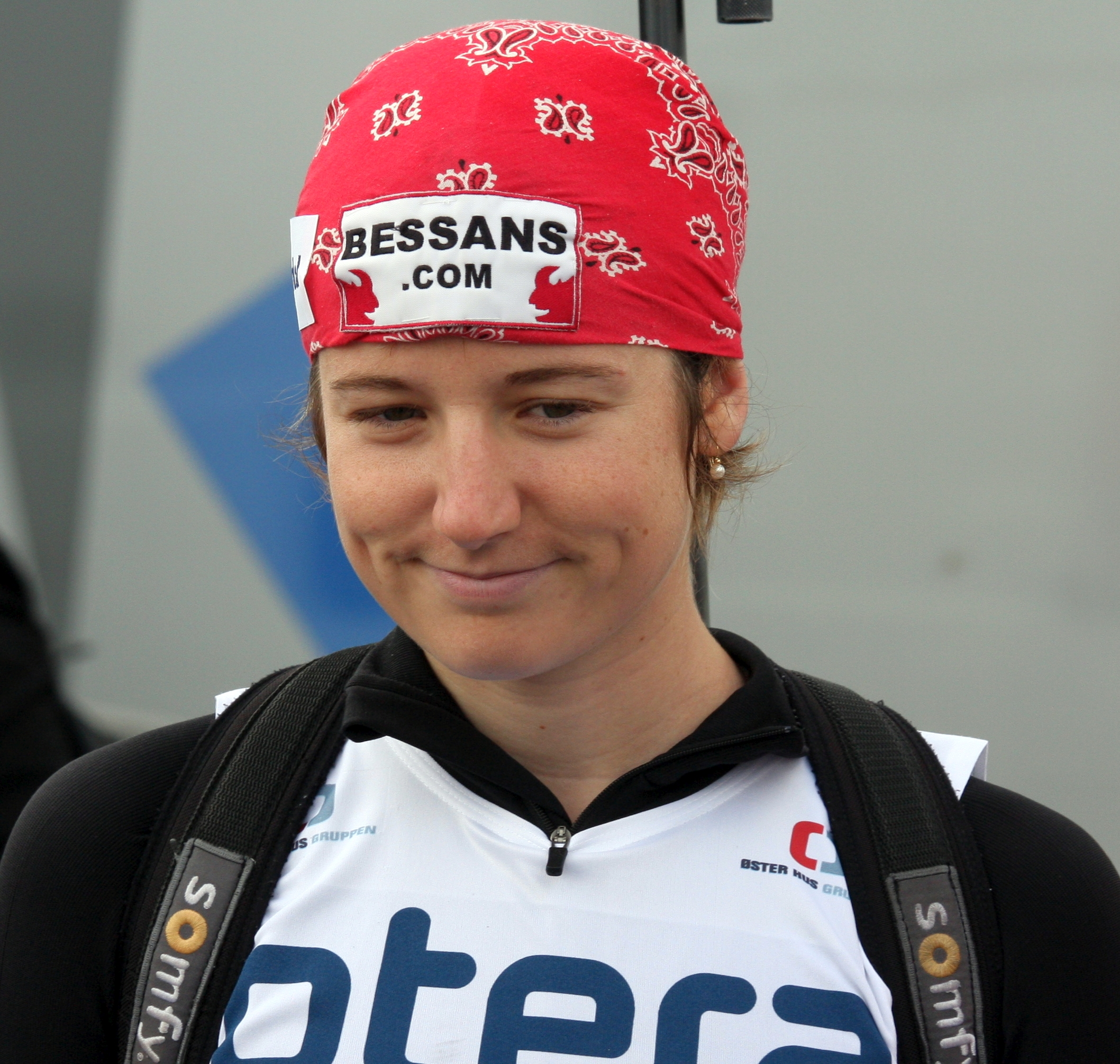

Personal information
- Born: 3 March 1986 (age 40) Chambéry

Sport
- Sport: Biathlon
- Club: Étoile Sportive de Bessans

Pauline Macabies (born 3 March 1986) is a French biathlete licensed with the Étoile Sportive de Bessans.

== Sporting career ==
A multiple medallist in the junior ranks, Pauline Macabies made her first appearance at the Biathlon World Cup in Oslo in 2006. She returned to competition during the 2006–2007 season and scored her first points in an individual race held in Hochfilzen in Austria finishing 14th. She achieved her first podium finish in a relay in January 2008 in Oberhof.

She has two participations in the Biathlon World Championships in 2007 and 2008 (24th in the individual in 2008 is her best result).

She retired from biathlon in 2013.

== Rankings ==
=== World Championships ===
World Championships | Event	Individual	Sprint	Pursuit	Mass departure	Relay	Mixed relay
2007 Antholz-Anterselva	-	44th	37th	-	-	-
2008 Östersund	24th	-	-	-	-	-

=== World Cup ===
- Best overall ranking: 49th in 2011.
- Best individual result: 14th place.
- 3 podium finishes in relays: 2 second places and 1 third place.
- 1 podium in mixed relay: 1 third place.

==== World Cup standings ====
Season	Final overall standings	Individual	Sprint	Pursuit	Mass start
2005-2006	nc		nc		
2006-2007	62nd	37th	nc	nc	
2007-2008	51st	28th	59th	nc	
2008-2009	58th	49th	42th	74th	
2009-2010	nc	nc	nc		
2010-2011	47th	49th	43th	47th	
2011-2012	97th		80th		

=== Junior World Championships ===
- 2006 World Junior Championships in Presque Isle (United States) :
  - Silver medal for individual.
  - Silver medal for the relay.
- 2007 Junior World Championships in Martell-Val Martello (Italy) :
  - Silver medal for the relay.

=== European Junior Championships ===
- 2006 European Junior Championships in Langdorf (Germany) :
  - Gold medal for individual.
  - Silver medal in the sprint.
  - Bronze medal in the pursuit.
  - Bronze medal for the relay.

=== European Junior Cup ===
- 1st in the general classification and in the pursuit classification during the Junior European Biathlon Cup (2005/2006 season).
