= Michela Ponza =

Italian biathlete (born 1979)

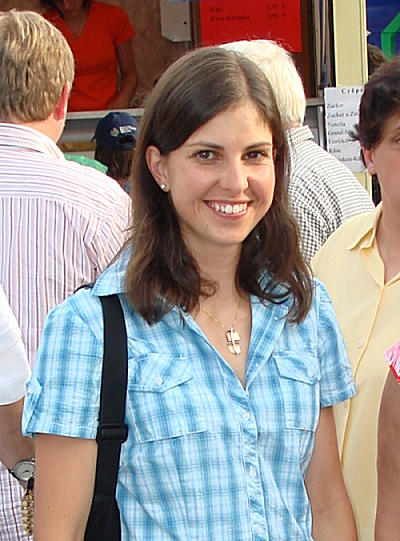

Personal information
- Full name: Michela Ponza
- Born: 12 February 1979 (age 47) Bolzano, Italy
- Height: 1.64 m (5 ft 5 in)
- Weight: 52 kg (115 lb)
- Website: michelaponza.com

Sport

Professional information
- Sport: Biathlon
- Club: G.S. Fiamme Gialle
- World Cup debut: 14 March 1998
- Retired: 23 March 2014

Olympic Games
- Teams: 4 (2002, 2006, 2010, 2014)
- Medals: 0

World Championships
- Teams: 14 (1998, 2000, 2001, 2002, 2003, 2004, 2005, 2006, 2007, 2008, 2009, 2011, 2012, 2013)
- Medals: 1 (0 gold)

World Cup
- Seasons: 17 (1997/98–2013/14)
- Individual victories: 0
- All victories: 0
- Individual podiums: 7
- All podiums: 9
Medal record
Women's biathlon
Representing Italy
World Championships
Bronze medal – third place	2013 Nové Město	4 × 6 km relay
Junior World Championships
Silver medal – second place	1998 Jericho/Valcartier	Individual
Bronze medal – third place	1998 Jericho/Valcartier	Relay
Bronze medal – third place	1999 Pokljuka	10 km pursuit

Michela Ponza (born 12 February 1979) is a retired Italian professional biathlete, who competed on the World Cup circuit from the final round of the World Cup in the 1997–98 season to the final round in the 2013–14 season.

== Biography ==
She had seven individual podium finishes, four second places and three third places. She has also competed in 4 Olympic Games, in Salt Lake City in 2002, in Turin in 2006, in Vancouver in 2010 and finally in Sochi in 2014. Her best Olympic result was a fifth place in the pursuit in 2006. Ponza was born in Bolzano, but lives in Santa Cristina Gherdëina. She is the granddaughter of Vincenzo Demetz.

== Achievements ==
- 1999: 1st, Italian championships of biathlon
- 2000: 1st, Italian championships of biathlon
- 2001: 1st, Italian championships of biathlon
- 2002: 2nd, Italian championships of biathlon
- 2003: 1st, Italian championships of biathlon
- 2004: 1st, Italian championships of biathlon
