= Natalia Guseva =

Russian biathlete

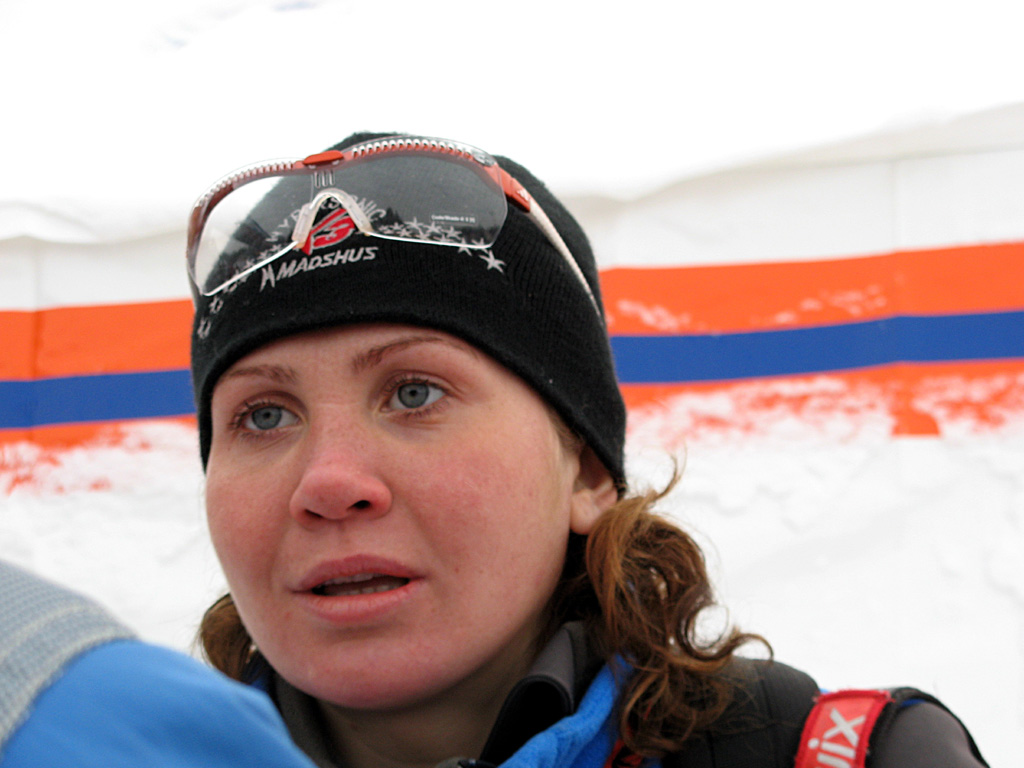
- Guseva in Khanty-Mansiysk, 2007

Personal information
- Native name: Наталья Владимировна Гусева (-Сорокина)
- Full name: Nataliya Vladimirovna Guseva (-Sorokina)
- Nationality: Russian
- Born: 12 September 1982 (age 43) Tikhvin, Russian SFSR
- Height: 165 cm (5 ft 5 in)
- Weight: 60 kg (132 lb)
Medal record
Women's biathlon
Representing Russia
World Championships
Bronze medal – third place	2007 Antholz	7.5 km sprint

Natalia Vladimirovna Guseva (Russian: Ната́лья Влади́мировна Гу́сева; born 12 September 1982 in Tikhvin, Russian SFSR), née Sorokina (Сорокина), is a Russian female biathlete who lives in Saint Petersburg. Besides her biathlon career, she is a professional soldier, and as such represents the Russian Army sports club.

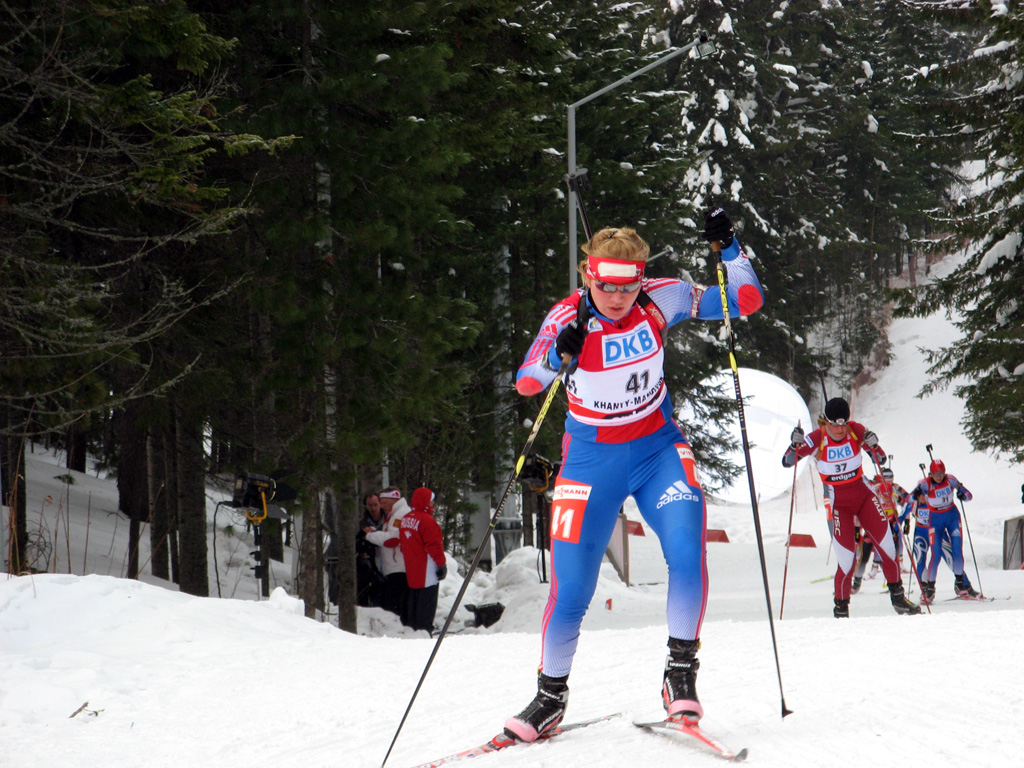
Natalia Guseva; shot in Khanty-Mansyisk

== Career highlights ==
Major championships:

- Guseva has one World Championship medal: the bronze in the Sprint event of the 2007 World Championships in Antholz, Italy. In the same Championships, she got three other top-10 placements: 4th place in the Pursuit, 4th in the Mass start, and 7th in the Relay.
- In the 2004 World Championships in Oberhof, Germany, Guseva finished 10th in the Pursuit, and 7th in the Mass start.
- In her first Winter Olympics, the 2006 OWG in Torino, she took part in the Mass start event, where she finished 24th.

Biathlon World Cup:

- Guseva has one BWC race victory, the Sprint in Antholz in the 2003-04 season.
- She has one second place, in the Mass start at the same BWC meet.
- She has two third places: the Individual competition in Hochfilzen in the 2005-06 season, and the Sprint in Antholz in the 2006-07 season, the same Sprint as the World Championship one where she got her bronze medal.
