= Maxim Chudov =

Russian biathlete (born 1982)

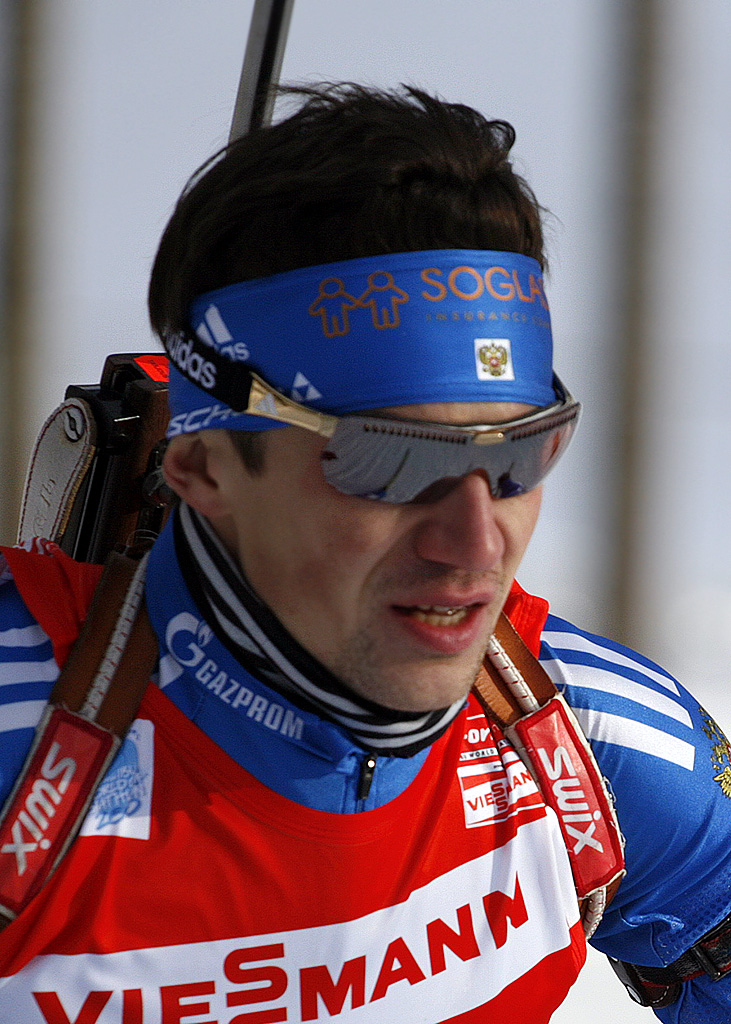
- Chudov in Kontiolahti in 2010.

Personal information
- Full name: Maxim Alexandrovich Chudov
- Nicknames: "Russian Rocket", "The Miracle" (Russian: Чудо)
- Born: 12 November 1982 (age 43) Mikhaylovka, Bashkir ASSR, RSFSR, Soviet Union
- Height: 1.69 m (5 ft 7 in)

Sport

Professional information
- Sport: Biathlon
- World Cup debut: 21 January 2005
- Retired: 18 December 2013

Olympic Games
- Teams: 2 (2006, 2010)
- Medals: 0 (0 gold)

World Championships
- Teams: 7 (2005, 2006, 2007, 2008, 2009, 2010, 2011)
- Medals: 7 (3 gold)

World Cup
- Seasons: 7 (2004/05–2010/11)
- Individual victories: 4
- All victories: 11
- Individual podiums: 18
- All podiums: 33
Medal record
Men's biathlon
Representing Russia
Olympic Games
Disqualified	2010 Vancouver	4 × 7.5 km relay
World Championships
Gold medal – first place	2007 Antholz-Anterselva	4 × 7.5 km relay
Gold medal – first place	2008 Östersund	10 km sprint
Gold medal – first place	2008 Östersund	4 × 7.5 km relay
Silver medal – second place	2007 Antholz-Anterselva	12.5 km pursuit
Silver medal – second place	2008 Östersund	12.5 km pursuit
Silver medal – second place	2009 Pyeongchang	12.5 km pursuit
Bronze medal – third place	2008 Östersund	15 km mass start
Summer World Championships
Gold medal – first place	2006 Ufa	12.5 km pursuit
Gold medal – first place	2012 Ufa	10 km sprint
Silver medal – second place	2007 Otepää	10 km sprint
Silver medal – second place	2007 Otepää	12.5 km pursuit
Silver medal – second place	2012 Ufa	12.5 km pursuit
Junior World Championships
Gold medal – first place	2003 Kościelisko	12.5 km pursuit
Gold medal – first place	2003 Kościelisko	4 × 7.5 km relay
Silver medal – second place	2002 Ridnaun	12.5 km pursuit
Bronze medal – third place	2003 Kościelisko	10 km sprint

Maxim Alexandrovich Chudov (often also Tchoudov; Russian: Максим Александрович Чудов; born 12 November 1982) is a former Russian biathlete.

== Career ==
He debuted in the Biathlon World Cup in the 2004/05 season and has since been a regular member of the Russian team. He has won a total of seven medals at World Championships, three gold, three silver, and one bronze.

Chudov retired from the sport after the IBU Cup in Obertilliach in the 2013–14 season.

== Biathlon results ==
All results are sourced from the International Biathlon Union.

=== Olympic Games ===
0 medals

Event	Individual	Sprint	Pursuit	Mass start	Relay
(Italy) 2006 Turin	32nd	9th	9th	15th	—
(Canada) 2010 Vancouver	—	63rd	—	—	DSQ (Bronze)

=== World Championships ===
7 medals (3 gold, 3 silver, 1 bronze)

Event	Individual	Sprint	Pursuit	Mass start	Relay	Mixed relay
(Austria) 2005 Hochfilzen	—	36th	31st	—	—	—
(Slovenia) 2006 Pokljuka	—N/a	—N/a	—N/a	—N/a	—N/a	16th
(Italy) 2007 Antholz-Anterselva	—	13th	Silver	22nd	Gold	9th
(Sweden) 2008 Östersund	5th	Gold	Silver	Bronze	Gold	—
(South Korea) 2009 Pyeongchang	10th	5th	Silver	7th	6th	5th
(Russia) 2010 Khanty-Mansiysk	—N/a	—N/a	—N/a	—N/a	—N/a	4th
(Russia) 2011 Khanty-Mansiysk	9th	—	—	30th	—	—

*During Olympic seasons competitions are only held for those events not included in the Olympic program.

=== Individual victories ===
4 victories (1 In, 2 Sp, 1 Pu)

Season	Date	Location	Discipline	Level
2006–07; 1 victory (1 Pu)	17 March 2007	(Russia) Khanty-Mansiysk	12.5 km pursuit	Biathlon World Cup
2007–08; 1 victory (1 Sp)	9 February 2008	(Sweden) Östersund	10 km sprint	Biathlon World Championships
2008–09; 2 victories (1 In, 1 Sp)	18 December 2008	(Austria) Hochfilzen	20 km individual	Biathlon World Cup
2008–09; 2 victories (1 In, 1 Sp)	10 January 2009	(Germany) Oberhof	10 km sprint	Biathlon World Cup

*Results are from UIPMB and IBU races which include the Biathlon World Cup, Biathlon World Championships and the Winter Olympic Games.
