= Dmitri Yaroshenko =

Russian former biathlete (born 1976)

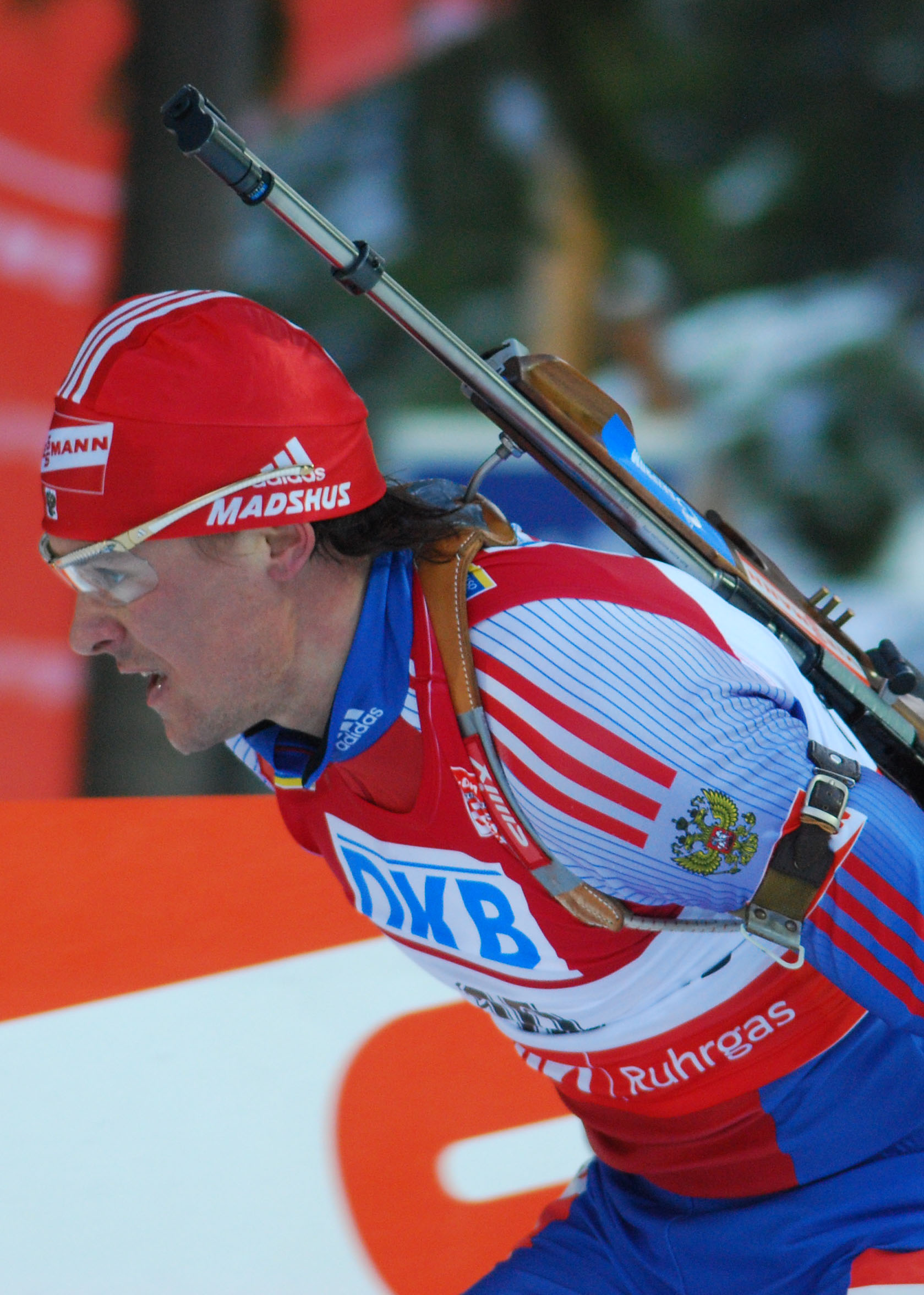
- Yaroshenko in Östersund in 2008.

Personal information
- Full name: Dmitri Vladimirovich Yaroshenko
- Born: 4 November 1976 (age 49) Makarov, RSFSR, Soviet Union
- Height: 1.82 m (6 ft 0 in)

Sport

Professional information
- Sport: Biathlon
- Club: Dinamo
- World Cup debut: 12 March 1999

World Championships
- Teams: 2 (2007, 2008)
- Medals: 3 (2 gold)

World Cup
- Seasons: 8 (1998/99, 2002/03, 2004/05–2008/09, 2010/11)
- Individual victories: 1
- All victories: 6
- Individual podiums: 10
- All podiums: 21
- Discipline titles: 1: 1 Pursuit (2006–07)
Medal record
Representing Russia
Men's biathlon
World Championships
| Gold medal – first place | 2008 Östersund | 4 × 7.5 km relay |
| Gold medal – first place | 2007 Antholz-Anterselva | 4 × 7.5 km relay |
| Bronze medal – third place | 2008 Östersund | Mixed relay |

Dmitri Vladimirovich Yaroshenko (Russian: Дмитрий Владимирович Ярошенко; born 4 November 1976) is a Russian former biathlete.

He broke through during the 2006–07 season at the age of 30, after winning a European Championship silver medal in 2004. He won one victory in the Biathlon World Cup, the Hochfilzen sprint in 2007.

However, ahead of the 2009 World Championships, it was announced that Yaroshenko had tested positive for a banned substance. Yaroshenko subsequently received a two-year ban from competition. After being unable to return to his former level and the World Cup, bar one race, after the end of the ban, Yaroshenko retired after the 2012–13 season.

== Life and career ==
Yaroshenko is a military officer. He has been a biathlete since 1987. The following season, he took his first World Cup points in a race in Khanty-Mansiysk in 2005, aged 28. Earlier in the season, he had finished third in the Summer Grand Prix events in Khanty-Mansiysk, on roller skis. He also won an individual European Cup race in Garmisch-Partenkirchen.

Yaroshenko won three European Cup sprints in the 2005–06 season, and won the European Cup that year. He got one start in the World Cup before the 2006 Winter Olympics, finishing 24th and as the sixth-best Russian in a sprint in Oberhof. In total, Yaroshenko appeared in eight World Cup races that season, with a best place of 13th in Holmenkollen, and with an overall place of 61st.

Yaroshenko was selected for the World Cup team from the opening race of the 2006–07 season, and with a flawless shooting he entered the podium in his second start of the season, 15.5 seconds behind winner Ole Einar Bjørndalen in a sprint race in Östersund. Yaroshenko finished as runner-up in two more races before the Christmas break, and was second in the overall World Cup after two weeks of competition. A poor performance in the third World Cup meet moved him down to third, but he was back to second after fifth and second place in Oberhof in the first meet after the break. At this point, he also led the pursuit Cup, where three of his four-second places had been achieved. Also, Yaroshenko had been part of the Russian relay team all season, and after three races they led the relay Cup by eleven points.

=== Doping case ===
On 13 February 2009, the IBU announced Yaroshenko and teammates Ekaterina Iourieva and Albina Akhatova, tested positive for EPO during the World Cup in Östersund. Each were banned for two years, with all results that season being struck.

=== Return ===
Yaroshenko returned in 2010, but he could never repeat his former success. Although he became an absolute champion on Roller-ski Biathlon World Championship 2011 in Nove Mesto (he won the sprint, the pursuit and the mixed relay), but he had no significant performance in IBU competitions, participating in only one World Cup race for the rest of his career.

On 31 March 2013 Yaroshenko had his last start (in Tyumen). He had earlier announced his retirement.

== Biathlon results ==
All results are sourced from the International Biathlon Union.

=== World Championships ===
3 medals (2 gold, 1 bronze)

| Event | Individual | Sprint | Pursuit | Mass start | Relay | Mixed relay |
|---|---|---|---|---|---|---|
| (Italy) 2007 Antholz-Anterselva | — | 27th | 8th | — | Gold | 9th |
| (Sweden) 2008 Östersund | 11th | 10th | 4th | 6th | Gold | Bronze |

*During Olympic seasons competitions are only held for those events not included in the Olympic program.

=== Individual victories ===
1 victory (1 Sp)

| Season | Date | Location | Discipline | Level |
|---|---|---|---|---|
| 2007–08; 1 victory (1 Sp) | 7 December 2007 | (Austria) Hochfilzen | 10 km sprint | Biathlon World Cup |

*Results are from UIPMB and IBU races which include the Biathlon World Cup, Biathlon World Championships and the Winter Olympic Games.
