= Ekaterina Iourieva =

Russian biathlete (born 1983)

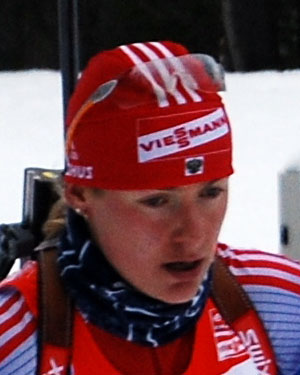

Personal information
- Born: 11 June 1983 (age 43)

Sport

Professional information
- Sport: Biathlon
Medal record
Women's biathlon
Representing Russia
World Championships
Gold medal – first place	2008 Östersund	15 km individual
Silver medal – second place	2008 Östersund	10 km pursuit
Bronze medal – third place	2008 Östersund	12.5 km mass start
Junior World Championships
Silver medal – second place	2004 Haute Maurienne	3 × 6 km relay

Ekaterina Valeryevna Iourieva (Russian: Екатерина Валерьевна Юрьева; born June 11, 1983, in Chaykovsky, Perm Krai) is a Russian former biathlete and 2008 World Champion in the 15 km individual. She was disqualified for 10 years for doping violations.

== Doping cases ==
On February 13, 2009, IBU announced Iourieva, as well as two other Russian team members, Olympic champion Albina Akhatova and world champion Dmitri Yaroshenko, tested positive for EPO during the World Cup in Östersund. Iourieva has been banned for two years.

In January 2014, she was reported to fail the doping test again. In February 2014, in her blog Iourieva announced her retirement. On July 14, 2014, she was formally disqualified for eight years, and all her results after December 23, 2013, were made void.

== Career ==
=== 2004/2005 ===
Made her World Cup debut in January 2005 in 15 km individual race at Antholtz-Anterselva finishing 43rd. In the other four races of the season scored points only once in the 7.5 km pursuit at Pokljuka.

=== 2005/2006 ===
Did not compete at the World Cup.

=== 2006/2007 ===
Starting with the World Championships finished in top-8 in 8 out of 11 races including first three podiums at Lahti and Oslo-Holmenkollen. Ranked 13th in the World Cup Total.

=== 2007/2008 ===
Won her first World Cup race as well as collected full set of medals at the World Championships. After back-to-back 2nd-place finishes at Hochfilzen won 15 km individual race at Pokljuka. During the World Championships at Östersund shot flawlessly in both 15 km individual race claiming gold medal and 10 km pursuit earning silver medal, missed only two targets in 12.5 km mass start winning her third, bronze, medal of the Championships. Skipped two World Cup stages due to illness and fatigue. Finished 6th in the World Cup Total.

=== 2008/2009 ===
Missed flower ceremony in only 3 out of 14 races. Won career first 7.5 km sprint at Oberhof and 12.5 km mass start at Antholz. Four more podium finishes : twice in a 10 km pursuit, once in each of 7.5 km sprint and 15 km individual races. Took part in all three relay races Russian team won this season. Going into 2009 World Championships Iourieva was the World Cup leader. However, she was stripped of all results of the season following revelation of the positive doping test taken in December at Östersund.

=== 2010/2011 ===
Iourieva's disqualification term expired on December 4, 2010, and she revealed plans to return to the sport and to start her career in biathlon anew.

== Results ==
=== World Championships ===
Event	Individual	Sprint	Pursuit	Mass Start	Relay	Mixed Relay
(Italy) 2007 Antholz-Anterselva	7th	―	―	5th	7th	―
(Sweden) 2008 Östersund	Gold	9th	Silver	Bronze	4th	―

Winner - 2.

2nd place - 4.

3rd place - 3.

4th-8th places - 11.

Total races - 50.
