= Helena Ekholm =

Swedish biathlete

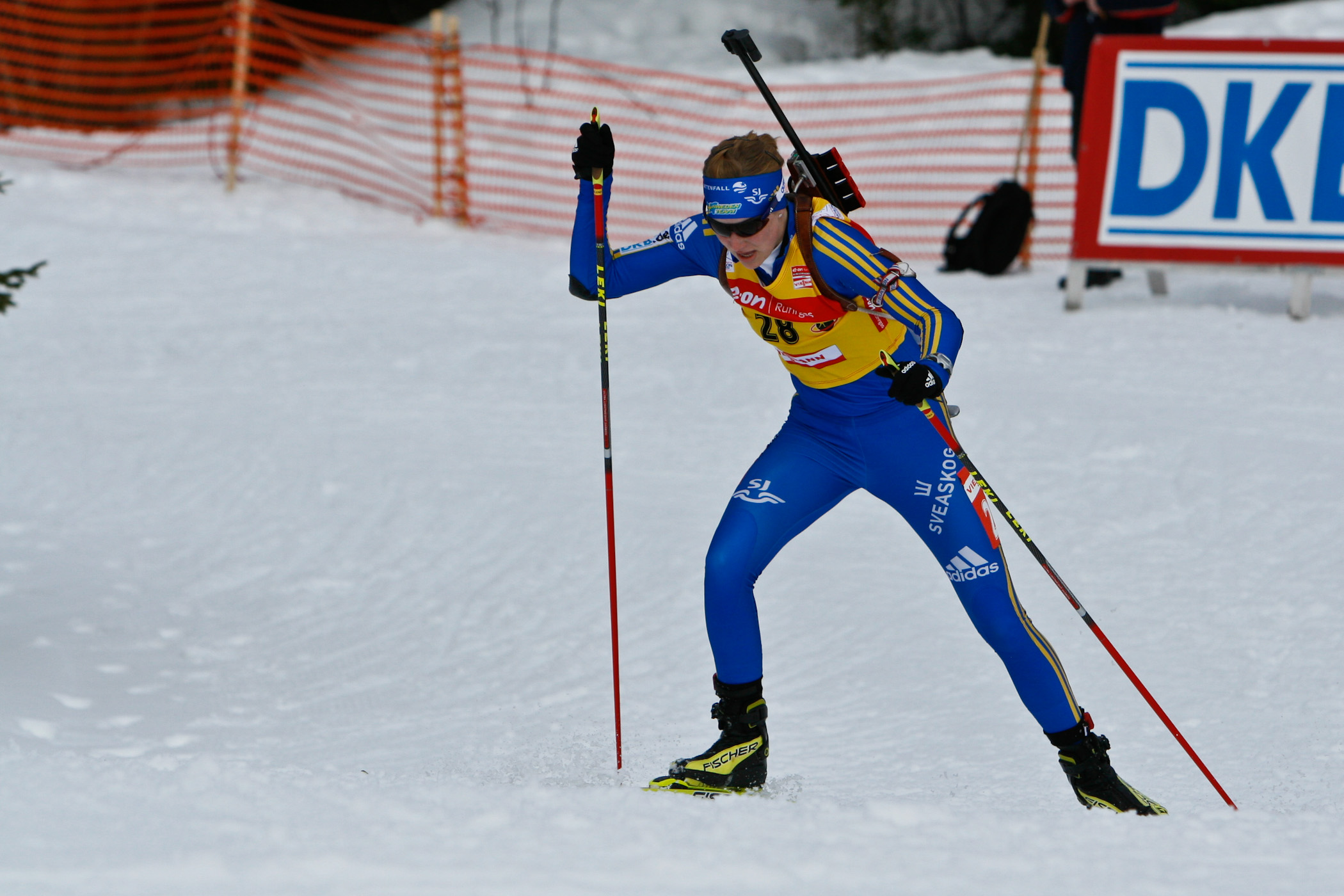
- Helena Jonsson in Trondheim, March 2009

Personal information
- Nickname: Lill-Hinken (early career)
- Nationality: Swedish
- Born: 6 September 1984 (age 41) Sollefteå, Sweden
- Years active: 2000–2012
- Height: 172 cm (5 ft 8 in)
- Weight: 59 kg (130 lb)

Sport

Professional information
- Club: I21 IF (Helgum, Sweden)
- Skis: Fischer
- Rifle: Anschutz
- IBU Cup debut: 30 November 2002
- World Cup debut: 29 November 2005
- Retired: 19 March 2012

Olympic Games
- Teams: 1 (2010)

World Championships
- Teams: 7
- Medals: 8 (3 gold)

World Cup
- Seasons: 7
- Individual races: 160
- All races: 198
- Individual victories: 13
- All victories: 17
- Individual podiums: 33
- All podiums: 43
- Overall titles: 1 (08/09)
- Discipline titles: 4 (SP 08/09, MS 08/09, IN 10/11, IN 11/12)
Medal record
Women's biathlon
Representing Sweden
World Championships
Gold medal – first place	2007 Antholz-Anterselva	Mixed relay
Gold medal – first place	2009 Pyeongchang	10 km pursuit
Gold medal – first place	2011 Khanty-Mansiysk	15 km individual
Silver medal – second place	2009 Pyeongchang	Mixed relay
Bronze medal – third place	2009 Pyeongchang	12.5 km mass start
Bronze medal – third place	2010 Khanty-Mansiysk	Mixed relay
Bronze medal – third place	2011 Khanty-Mansiysk	10 km pursuit
Bronze medal – third place	2012 Ruhpolding	15 km individual
- Updated on 10 January 2018

Helena Ekholm (née Jonsson) (born 6 September 1984) is a Swedish former biathlete. She was born in Helgum, Sollefteå. She is the 2009 world champion in pursuit and the 2011 world champion in individual. She also won the Women's Overall World Cup in the 2008–09 season. In 2009, Ekholm won the Jerring Award.

== Career ==
Jonsson debuted in 2005 in Östersund in the relay, coming in 15th. In the following World Cup in Hochfilzen she participated in her first individual, coming in 41st. In early 2006 she participated in the Biathlon World Championships Mixed Relay event in 2006 in Pokljuka, coming in sixth. The 2006-07 Biathlon World Cup began very successfully for her. In the World Cup 3 in Hochfilzen, she came in fourth in the Individual, eighth in the Sprint, and was on the relay team which came in fifth. In the Biathlon World Championships 2007 in Antholz she continued her upward trend and placed fourth in the Sprint. As a high point she led the Swedish team to a gold medal in the mixed-relay. She celebrated her first World Cup victory in the 2006-07 Biathlon World Cup, the mass start in the final round at Khanty-Mansiysk. In the 2008–2009 season she won four more races, including the opening in Östersund where she won the individual race. In the 2009 World Championships in Pyeongchang Jonsson came from 5th place after the opening sprint to win the Pursuit.

After her marriage to Swedish former biathlete David Ekholm, she changed her surname to Ekholm in the summer of 2010.

== Biathlon World Cup placings ==
Place	Individual	Sprint	Pursuit	Mass start	Relay	Mixed relay	Total
1st	4	2	3	4	2	2	17
2nd	1	4	2	2	2	1	12
3rd	3	4	2	2	2	1	14
Podium	8	10	7	8	6	4	43
4th–10th	5	21	11	13	20	5	75
Top 10	13	31	18	21	26	9	118

(Retired 19 March 2012)

Awards
Preceded by Jonas Jacobsson	Svenska Dagbladet Gold Medal; 2009	Succeeded by Sweden's men's Olympic 4 × 10 km cross-country skiing relay team: Daniel Rickardsson, Johan Olsson, Anders Södergren & Marcus Hellner
