= Tatiana Moiseeva =

Russian biathlete (born 1981)

Personal information
- Full name: Tatiana Yurievna Moiseeva
- Born: 7 September 1981 Khanty-Mansiysk, Russian SFSR, Soviet Union

Sport

Professional information
- Sport: Biathlon
- World Cup debut: 15 February 2003
- Retired: 2008

World Championships
- Teams: 2 (2007, 2008)

World Cup
- Seasons: 4 (2002/03–2003/04, 2006/07–2007/08)
- Individual podiums: 4
- All podiums: 7
Medal record
Women's biathlon
Representing Russia
Junior World Championships
| Gold medal – first place | 2001 Khanty-Mansiysk | 12.5 km individual |
| Gold medal – first place | 2001 Khanty-Mansiysk | 3 × 7.5 km relay |

Tatiana Moiseeva (Russian: Татья́на Ю́рьевна Моисе́ева; born 9 September 1981) is a retired Russian biathlete.

== Career ==
Moiseeva made her Biathlon World Cup debut in a sprint race in Oslo Holmenkollen during the 2002-03 Biathlon World Cup season. She was in and out of the A-Team for the next few years until she became a permanent member of the team during the 2006-07 Biathlon World Cup season. However, this mostly had to do with several established names on the Russian team having to sit out due to injuries, pregnancies or doping bans.

Moiseeva's best-ever results came in the sprint and pursuit in Pokljuka, Slovenia during the 2006-07 Biathlon World Cup season, and again, in the individual in Kontiolahti, Finland the following season. Her best-ever finish in the overall World Cup came during these same seasons when she finished 20th both years.

In March 2008, Moiseeva was suspected of doping at the Biathlon World Championships 2008 in Östersund, Sweden. However, she got acquitted by the IBU as she only took her substance in liquid form and that was not considered a doping offense at that point in time.

=== World Championships ===
| Event | Individual | Sprint | Pursuit | Mass start | Team | Relay | Mixed relay |
|---|---|---|---|---|---|---|---|
| (Italy) 2007 Antholz-Anterselva | 22nd | 48th | 28th | 11th | —N/a | — | — |
| (Sweden) 2008 Östersund | 5th | — | — | 19th | —N/a | 4th | — |

*During Olympic seasons competitions are only held for those events not included in the Olympic program.
**Team was removed as an event in 1998, and pursuit was added in 1997 with mass start being added in 1999 and the mixed relay in 2005.
