= Biathlon at the 2002 Winter Olympics – Men's sprint =

Men's biathlon sprint at the XIX Olympic Winter Games
- Venue: Soldier Hollow
- Dates: 13 February 2002
- Competitors: 87 from 34 nations
- Winning time: 24:51.3

Medalists
1st place, gold medalist(s)		Ole Einar Bjørndalen	Norway
2nd place, silver medalist(s)		Sven Fischer	Germany
3rd place, bronze medalist(s)		Wolfgang Perner	Austria

The Men's 10 kilometre sprint biathlon competition at the 2002 Winter Olympics was held on 13 February, at Soldier Hollow. Competitors raced over two 3.0 kilometre loops and one 4.0 kilometre loop of the skiing course, shooting two times, once prone and once standing. Each miss was penalized by requiring the competitor to race over a 150-metre penalty loop.

== Results ==
Ole Einar Bjørndalen, having won the men's 20 kilometre Individual race two days before, came in as one of the favourites. Bjørndalen was also the defending World Cup champion in the sprint, as well as the defending Olympic champion in the discipline. In addition, he had won the 2001 test event at Soldier Hollow, beating countryman Frode Andresen, and won one of the four World Cup sprints earlier in the season. Raphaël Poirée, the defending overall World Cup champion, had also won a World Cup sprint race in 2001/02, but neither Poirée nor Bjørndalen was leading the World Cup standings, which were closely contested between Andresen, Frank Luck and the defending World Champion in the distance, Pavel Rostovtsev.

Germans Ricco Groß and Sven Fischer set the early pace, both shooting clear on the first shoot, then missing one in the second, with Fischer pulling away over the last loop to lead his countryman by 25 seconds at the finish. Poirée led both of them after the first shoot, but put two shots wide on his final round, dropping him out of contention. Rovstovtsev, not skiing as quickly as Poirée, was also well placed after one shoot, but his one miss on the second left him five seconds behind Groß at the finish.

Andresen, fresh off a disappointment in the final round of shooting in the individual, was clear on the first shoot, and quick on the skis, but, like the individual, struggled on the last shoot, missing twice and ending up in 8th. The man starting directly behind him, Wolfgang Perner, was slower on the course, but didn't miss a shot, and just managed to edge Groß at the line, finishing 0.2 seconds ahead for, at the time, second place.

But Bjørndalen was still to come, and did not disappoint. The Norwegian shot clear at the opening attempt, but only left the range in 4th, behind Poirée, Andresen and Fischer. However, where all three of those had stumbled at the second shooting round, Bjørndalen made no mistake, shooting clear. He left the range 30 seconds ahead of his closest competitor, Fischer, and held that lead until the finish line for his second gold medal of the games. This was Bjørndalen's third Olympic gold medal, making him the first biathlete to achieve such a feat.

The race was held at 11:00.

Rank	Bib	Name	Country	Time	Penalties (P+S)	Deficit
1st place, gold medalist(s)	81	Ole Einar Bjørndalen	Norway	24:51.3	0 (0+0)	
2nd place, silver medalist(s)	10	Sven Fischer	Germany	25:20.2	1 (0+1)	+28.9
3rd place, bronze medalist(s)	63	Wolfgang Perner	Austria	25:44.4	0 (0+0)	+53.1
4	6	Ricco Groß	Germany	25:44.6	1 (0+1)	+53.3
5	23	Wolfgang Rottmann	Austria	25:48.8	2 (1+1)	+57.5
6	39	Pavel Rostovtsev	Russia	25:50.1	1 (0+1)	+58.8
7	24	Viktor Maigourov	Russia	25:50.9	0 (0+0)	+59.6
8	62	Frode Andresen	Norway	25:51.5	2 (0+2)	+1:00.2
9	35	Raphaël Poirée	France	25:56.9	2 (0+2)	+1:05.6
10	2	Ludwig Gredler	Austria	26:04.3	2 (1+1)	+1:13.0
11	87	Oleg Ryzhenkov	Belarus	26:05.5	0 (0+0)	+1:14.2
12	58	Vadim Sashurin	Belarus	26:09.9	0 (0+0)	+1:18.6
13	77	Halvard Hanevold	Norway	26:12.5	0 (0+0)	+1:21.2
14	72	Zdeněk Vítek	Czech Republic	26:14.0	1 (0+1)	+1:22.7
15	51	Michael Greis	Germany	26:18.4	2 (1+1)	+1:27.1
16	50	Paavo Puurunen	Finland	26:24.7	1 (1+0)	+1:33.4
17	55	Björn Ferry	Sweden	26:30.5	2 (1+1)	+1:39.2
18	74	Wojciech Kozub	Poland	26:31.9	1 (0+1)	+1:40.6
19	17	Timo Antila	Finland	26:33.4	1 (0+1)	+1:42.1
20	34	Jeremy Teela	United States	26:36.6	2 (0+2)	+1:45.3
21	8	Vincent Defrasne	France	26:36.7	2 (1+1)	+1:45.4
22	75	René Cattarinussi	Italy	26:37.3	1 (0+1)	+1:46.0
23	49	Tomaž Globočnik	Slovenia	26:40.0	1 (0+1)	+1:48.7
24	76	Egil Gjelland	Norway	26:42.5	1 (1+0)	+1:51.2
25	29	Vesa Hietalahti	Finland	26:43.2	0 (0+0)	+1:51.9
26	67	Jay Hakkinen	United States	26:43.5	1 (1+0)	+1:52.2
27	84	Marko Dolenc	Slovenia	26:47.0	1 (0+1)	+1:55.7
28	82	Carl Johan Bergman	Sweden	26:47.1	1 (0+1)	+1:55.8
29	37	Frank Luck	Germany	26:47.7	2 (1+1)	+1:56.4
30	1	Dimitri Borovik	Estonia	26:50.1	2 (1+1)	+1:58.8
31	54	Tomasz Sikora	Poland	26:59.3	1 (0+1)	+2:08.0
32	83	Tomáš Holubec	Czech Republic	27:01.8	1 (0+1)	+2:10.5
33	42	Sergey Rusinov	Russia	27:04.3	1 (0+1)	+2:13.0
34	44	Roman Dostál	Czech Republic	27:04.9	2 (0+2)	+2:13.6
35	56	Julien Robert	France	27:05.1	2 (1+1)	+2:13.8
36	16	Vyacheslav Derkach	Ukraine	27:05.3	1 (0+1)	+2:14.0
37	59	Alexei Aidarov	Belarus	27:06.4	2 (1+1)	+2:15.1
38	26	Andriy Deryzemlia	Ukraine	27:11.1	1 (0+1)	+2:19.8
39	11	Marek Matiaško	Slovakia	27:12.6	1 (0+1)	+2:21.3
40	41	Ilmārs Bricis	Latvia	27:17.3	2 (1+1)	+2:26.0
41	30	Kyoji Suga	Japan	27:21.0	1 (0+1)	+2:29.7
42	31	Marian Blaj	Romania	27:25.5	1 (1+0)	+2:34.2
43	52	Robin Clegg	Canada	27:28.3	2 (1+1)	+2:37.0
44	73	Janez Marič	Slovenia	27:28.6	2 (0+2)	+2:37.3
45	27	Janno Prants	Estonia	27:29.2	3 (1+2)	+2:37.9
46	80	Oļegs Maļuhins	Latvia	27:30.7	3 (1+2)	+2:39.4
47	21	Petr Garabík	Czech Republic	27:30.9	2 (0+2)	+2:39.6
48	69	Indrek Tobreluts	Estonia	27:31.1	2 (0+2)	+2:39.8
49	25	Paolo Longo	Italy	27:31.9	0 (0+0)	+2:40.6
50	86	Wilfried Pallhuber	Italy	27:35.7	1 (0+1)	+2:44.4
51	43	Sergei Rozhkov	Russia	27:39.8	4 (3+1)	+2:48.5
52	19	Jēkabs Nākums	Latvia	27:40.9	1 (1+0)	+2:49.6
53	66	Ruslan Lysenko	Ukraine	27:43.1	2 (0+2)	+2:51.8
54	20	Lawton Redman	United States	27:43.4	2 (1+1)	+2:52.1
55	45	Roland Zwahlen	Switzerland	27:43.7	1 (1+0)	+2:52.4
56	38	Zhang Qing	China	27:45.3	3 (2+1)	+2:54.0
56	40	Aleksandr Syman	Belarus	27:45.3	1 (1+0)	+2:54.0
58	13	Wiesław Ziemianin	Poland	27:47.0	2 (0+2)	+2:55.7
59	22	Sašo Grajf	Slovenia	27:52.6	2 (0+2)	+3:01.3
60	60	Georgi Kasabov	Bulgaria	27:55.8	1 (0+1)	+3:04.5
61	78	Krzysztof Topór	Poland	28:02.2	3 (1+2)	+3:10.9
62	5	Hidenori Isa	Japan	28:03.6	2 (1+1)	+3:12.3
63	68	Henrik Forsberg	Sweden	28:04.0	6 (2+4)	+3:12.7
64	64	Jean-Marc Chabloz	Switzerland	28:08.6	1 (0+1)	+3:17.3
65	70	Gundars Upenieks	Latvia	28:11.9	3 (3+0)	+3:20.6
66	32	Gilles Marguet	France	28:20.1	4 (1+3)	+3:28.8
67	9	Matthias Simmen	Switzerland	28:22.8	3 (1+2)	+3:31.5
68	18	Devis Da Canal	Italy	28:25.9	2 (0+2)	+3:34.6
69	71	Yukio Mochizuki	Japan	28:28.5	2 (2+0)	+3:37.2
70	79	Roland Lessing	Estonia	28:34.4	2 (2+0)	+3:43.1
71	61	Jason Sklenar	Great Britain	28:43.4	4 (2+2)	+3:52.1
72	7	Mark Gee	Great Britain	28:57.8	2 (2+0)	+4:06.5
73	65	Olli-Pekka Peltola	Finland	28:58.5	1 (1+0)	+4:07.2
74	53	Mike Dixon	Great Britain	28:58.7	1 (0+1)	+4:07.4
75	4	Imre Tagscherer	Hungary	29:08.6	3 (1+2)	+4:17.3
76	85	Roman Pryma	Ukraine	29:16.1	3 (1+2)	+4:24.8
77	28	Aleksandr Tropnikov	Kyrgyzstan	29:30.2	2 (1+1)	+4:38.9
78	12	Tord Wiksten	Sweden	29:39.5	4 (2+2)	+4:48.2
79	33	Dmitry Pantov	Kazakhstan	29:46.3	5 (2+3)	+4:55.0
80	47	Shin Byung-Kook	South Korea	29:51.1	2 (1+1)	+4:59.8
81	36	Ricardo Oscare	Argentina	30:00.2	3 (0+3)	+5:08.9
82	48	Liutauras Barila	Lithuania	30:01.4	5 (2+3)	+5:10.1
83	46	Mihail Gribuşencov	Moldova	30:02.2	2 (1+1)	+5:10.9
84	15	Žarko Galjanić	Croatia	30:33.0	3 (1+2)	+5:41.7
85	14	Stavros Khristoforidis	Greece	31:51.4	2 (1+1)	+7:00.1
86	3	Carlos Varas	Chile	32:48.1	0 (0+0)	+7:56.8
	57	Christoph Sumann	Austria	DNF	2 (0+2)	
