= Biathlon at the 2002 Winter Olympics – Men's pursuit =

Men's biathlon pursuit at the XIX Olympic Winter Games
- Venue: Soldier Hollow
- Dates: 16 February 2002
- Competitors: 57 from 25 nations
- Winning time: 32:34.6

Medalists
1st place, gold medalist(s)		Ole Einar Bjørndalen	Norway
2nd place, silver medalist(s)		Raphaël Poirée	France
3rd place, bronze medalist(s)		Ricco Groß	Germany

The Men's 12.5 kilometre pursuit biathlon competition at the 2002 Winter Olympics was held on 16 February, at Soldier Hollow. Competitors raced over four 2.5 kilometre loops and one 2.75 kilometre loop of the skiing course, shooting four times, twice prone and twice standing. Each miss was penalized by requiring the competitor to race over a 150-metre penalty loop.

The pursuit was a newly introduced race at the 2002 Olympics, with athletes starting in the same order, and with the same time gaps, as their finish in the sprint event a few days earlier. Only the top 60 from the sprint were eligible to enter, though three athletes of the top 60 opted not to start.

== Results ==
Ole Einar Bjørndalen, having won both of the previous individual events in Soldier Hollow, was going for an unprecedented sweep, and based on his win in the sprint, would start 29 seconds ahead of Sven Fischer, and more than 50 seconds ahead of the third and fourth starters, Wolfgang Perner and Ricco Groß. The World Cup pursuit leader, and defending World Cup overall and pursuit champion Raphael Poirée, was another serious challenger, but he would start over a minute behind Bjørndalen. Pavel Rostovtsev was the defending World Champion, though unlike the World Championships, where he started with the lead, in Salt Lake he started a minute behind the leader, in 6th.

Bjørndalen missed a shot on his first set of attempts, but still held the lead after the first shot, as even a clear shoot from Fischer behind him still gave the Norwegian a 14-second lead. Perner missed once to fall back, with Groß going clear to move into a clear third. That was as close as anyone would get to Bjørndalen all day, as he shot clean at the second and third attempts, and while he missed a shot on the final set, his lead at that point was well over a minute, and the one penalty loop did not cause him any trouble, as he easily claimed the gold medal. Bjørndalen's performance secured a third gold medal in the Salt Lake games, a first for any biathlete.

Fischer and Groß left the second shoot together, after Fischer missed a shot, but a further miss from Fischer on the third set of shots dropped him out of contention. Poirée missed a shot on the second shoot, but went clear at the third, and found himself in third place after misses from men ahead of him, including Rostovtsev, who had been clear before that. Groß arrived at the final shoot with a 25-second lead over Poirée, but missed two shots, while the Frenchman shot clear to virtually reverse the margin, leaving with a 20-second lead of his own, which he held onto to secure silver. Ludwig Gredler seemed to be out of it after a miss in the final shoot, as he left the range 25 seconds behind Gross. The Austrian put in a good chase, though, cutting the lead to just 4 seconds and ending up 4th.

The race was started at 09:00.

Rank	Bib	Name	Country	Start	Time	Penalties	Deficit
1st place, gold medalist(s)	1	Ole Einar Bjørndalen	Norway	0:00	32:34.6	2 (1+0+0+1)	–
2nd place, silver medalist(s)	9	Raphaël Poirée	France	1:06	33:17.6	1 (0+1+0+0)	+43.0
3rd place, bronze medalist(s)	4	Ricco Groß	Germany	0:53	33:30.6	2 (0+0+0+2)	+56.0
4	10	Ludwig Gredler	Austria	1:13	33:35.5	2 (0+1+0+1)	+1:00.9
5	6	Pavel Rostovtsev	Russia	0:59	33:43.1	2 (0+0+1+1)	+1:08.5
6	5	Wolfgang Rottmann	Austria	0:57	33:45.1	4 (1+0+2+1)	+1:10.5
7	7	Viktor Maigourov	Russia	1:00	33:55.1	3 (2+0+1+0)	+1:20.5
8	13	Halvard Hanevold	Norway	1:21	33:59.6	2 (0+2+0+0)	+1:25.0
9	3	Wolfgang Perner	Austria	0:53	34:00.1	3 (1+0+1+1)	+1:25.5
10	12	Vadim Sashurin	Belarus	1:19	34:00.5	1 (0+0+0+1)	+1:25.9
11	29	Frank Luck	Germany	1:56	34:01.0	1 (0+0+0+1)	+1:26.4
12	2	Sven Fischer	Germany	0:29	34:09.5	4 (0+1+1+2)	+1:34.9
13	26	Jay Hakkinen	United States	1:52	34:11.8	1 (0+0+0+1)	+1:37.2
14	8	Frode Andresen	Norway	1:00	34:14.5	5 (2+0+0+3)	+1:39.9
15	24	Egil Gjelland	Norway	1:51	34:16.9	1 (1+0+0+0)	+1:42.3
16	15	Michael Greis	Germany	1:27	34:19.9	3 (1+1+1+0)	+1:45.3
17	14	Zdeněk Vítek	Czech Republic	1:23	34:21.0	3 (0+1+0+2)	+1:46.4
18	21	Vincent Defrasne	France	1:45	34:33.6	3 (0+0+2+1)	+1:59.0
19	23	Tomaž Globočnik	Slovenia	1:49	34:42.6	0 (0+0+0+0)	+2:08.0
20	22	René Cattarinussi	Italy	1:46	35:00.9	1 (0+0+1+0)	+2:26.3
21	11	Oleg Ryzhenkov	Belarus	1:14	35:08.3	2 (0+2+0+0)	+2:33.7
22	25	Vesa Hietalahti	Finland	1:52	35:10.0	1 (0+0+0+1)	+2:35.4
23	20	Jeremy Teela	United States	1:45	35:18.1	3 (0+1+2+0)	+2:43.5
24	17	Björn Ferry	Sweden	1:39	35:27.5	4 (0+0+3+1)	+2:52.9
25	31	Tomasz Sikora	Poland	2:08	35:30.0	1 (0+0+0+1)	+2:55.4
26	30	Dimitri Borovik	Estonia	1:59	35:33.1	2 (1+0+0+1)	+2:58.5
27	51	Sergei Rozhkov	Russia	2:48	35:37.3	1 (1+0+0+0)	+3:02.7
28	16	Paavo Puurunen	Finland	1:33	36:03.5	3 (1+1+0+1)	+3:28.9
29	27	Marko Dolenc	Slovenia	1:56	36:06.1	4 (0+0+1+3)	+3:31.5
30	46	Oļegs Maļuhins	Latvia	2:39	36:10.5	3 (0+0+1+2)	+3:35.9
31	33	Sergey Rusinov	Russia	2:13	36:14.5	3 (0+2+0+1)	+3:39.9
32	19	Timo Antila	Finland	1:42	36:16.7	5 (0+0+3+2)	+3:42.1
33	50	Wilfried Pallhuber	Italy	2:44	36:19.7	2 (1+1+0+0)	+3:45.1
34	18	Wojciech Kozub	Poland	1:41	36:27.8	4 (2+2+0+0)	+3:53.2
35	41	Kyoji Suga	Japan	2:30	36:28.8	3 (1+1+0+1)	+3:54.2
36	28	Carl Johan Bergman	Sweden	1:56	36:33.4	1 (1+0+0+0)	+3:58.8
37	49	Paolo Longo	Italy	2:41	36:38.8	1 (0+0+0+1)	+4:04.2
38	44	Janez Marič	Slovenia	2:37	36:51.4	5 (1+1+1+2)	+4:16.8
39	35	Julien Robert	France	2:14	36:55.4	4 (2+1+1+0)	+4:20.8
40	36	Vyacheslav Derkach	Ukraine	2:14	36:56.8	3 (0+0+1+2)	+4:22.2
41	48	Indrek Tobreluts	Estonia	2:40	36:57.4	3 (1+0+1+1)	+4:22.8
42	43	Robin Clegg	Canada	2:37	37:04.6	3 (0+1+1+1)	+4:30.0
43	39	Marek Matiaško	Slovakia	2:21	37:26.0	5 (2+0+2+1)	+4:51.4
44	34	Roman Dostál	Czech Republic	2:14	37:26.8	6 (1+1+1+3)	+4:52.2
45	32	Tomáš Holubec	Czech Republic	2:11	37:31.1	6 (2+1+1+2)	+4:56.5
46	59	Sašo Grajf	Slovenia	3:01	37:38.9	3 (1+0+1+1)	+5:04.3
47	55	Roland Zwahlen	Switzerland	2:52	37:40.6	3 (0+0+1+2)	+5:06.0
48	37	Alexei Aidarov	Belarus	2:15	37:43.0	6 (0+0+3+3)	+5:08.4
49	57	Aleksandr Syman	Belarus	2:54	38:05.8	3 (1+2+0+0)	+5:31.2
50	58	Wiesław Ziemianin	Poland	2:56	38:45.7	4 (0+3+1+0)	+6:11.1
51	40	Ilmārs Bricis	Latvia	2:26	38:49.9	7 (0+1+3+3)	+6:15.3
52	54	Lawton Redman	United States	2:52	38:59.0	6 (1+0+3+2)	+6:24.4
53	56	Zhang Qing	China	2:54	39:11.1	5 (0+3+1+1)	+6:36.5
54	52	Jēkabs Nākums	Latvia	2:50	39:19.3	5 (1+2+2+0)	+6:44.7
55	42	Marian Blaj	Romania	2:34	39:31.2	6 (2+2+1+1)	+6:56.6
56	60	Georgi Kasabov	Bulgaria	3:04	40:38.5	7 (1+3+2+1)	+8:03.9
	45	Janno Prants	Estonia	2:38	DNF	(4+ + + )	
	38	Andriy Deryzemlya	Ukraine	2:20	Did not start		
	47	Petr Garabík	Czech Republic	2:40	Did not start		
	53	Ruslan Lysenko	Ukraine	2:52	Did not start		
