= Biathlon at the 2002 Winter Olympics – Men's relay =

Men's biathlon relay at the XIX Olympic Winter Games
- Venue: Soldier Hollow
- Dates: 20 February 2002
- Competitors: 76 from 19 nations
- Winning time: 1:23:42.3

Medalists
1st place, gold medalist(s)		Halvard Hanevold; Frode Andresen; Egil Gjelland; Ole Einar Bjørndalen	Norway
2nd place, silver medalist(s)		Ricco Groß; Peter Sendel; Sven Fischer; Frank Luck	Germany
3rd place, bronze medalist(s)		Gilles Marguet; Vincent Defrasne; Julien Robert; Raphaël Poirée	France

The Men's 4 × 7.5 kilometre biathlon relay competition at the 2002 Winter Olympics 20 February, at Soldier Hollow. Each national team consisted of four members, with each skiing 7.5 kilometres and shooting twice, once prone and once standing.

At each shooting station, a competitor has eight shots to hit five targets; however, only five bullets are loaded in a magazine at one - if additional shots are required, the spare bullets must be loaded one at a time. If after the eight shots are taken, there are still targets not yet hit, the competitor must ski a 150-metre penalty loop.

== Results ==
Norway, led by triple gold medalist Ole Einar Bjørndalen, were the defending World Cup winners and led the 2001/02 World Cup. The defending World Champions were France, while Germany were the defending Olympic champions and the only other country with more than one individual medal at the Games, and had won two of the four World Cup relays.

Clean shooting had Ukraine, with Vyacheslav Derkach, and Russia, with Viktor Maigourov, out of the first shoot in the lead, with most of the top teams near them, but Norway some 25 seconds behind after Halvard Hanevold missed a shot. Ukraine's time in the lead was short-lived, as they fell out of contention after Derkach went on the penalty loop after the second shoot. That put the Russians into the lead, after Maigurov shot clear again. They left some ten seconds ahead of Gilles Marguet of France and Petr Garabík of the Czech Republic. Hanevold shot clear to pull his team back up into 4th spot. Maigurov was strong in the ski into the exchange, exteing his lead over France and the Czechs, while Hanevold and Germany's Ricco Groß both equalled Maigurov's time, coming to the exchange 18 and 29 seconds behind the Russians, respectively.

Sergei Rozhkov took over in the lead for the Russians, and while he missed two on his first shoot, so did his closest pursuer, Frode Andresen, leaving the gap the same. However, both Germany, with Peter Sendel, and France with Vincent Defrasne, missed only once, and cut the lead down to around 20 seconds. All four of these skiers missed once on the second shoot, but it was Andresen who made up ground, passing Rozhkov before the end of the shoot, and extending the lead to a full 20 seconds over the Russian, now joined by Defrasne, at the hand off.

Egil Gjelland increased Norway's lead, shooting clear to open the third leg, getting more than 30 seconds over Russia's Sergei Tchepikov, who shot clear, and France's Julien Robert, who missed once, but didn't cede any time to the Russian. Germany's Sven Fischer had a terrible shoot, going on the penalty loop and leaving his team more than a minute in arrears. Gjelland missed a shot on the second shoot, but by this point it didn't seem to matter, as he was nearly a minute clear of Robert and Tchepikov, still together, and both missing twice. Fischer's charge back saw him get within 20 seconds of that pair, after missing just once. By the changeover, Gjelland's lead was over a minute, with Tchepikov dropping Robert by ten seconds, and Fischer coming back into third, passing the French.

Ole Einar Bjørndalen's missed two on the first shoot, and while that saw the gap to the chasing teams shrink, it was still over 40 seconds. Frank Luck, going for Germany, and Raphaël Poirée, for France, both shot clear, passing Russia's Pavel Rostovtsev, who missed once. Bjørndalen would miss again on the final shoot, but it didn't have any effect on the final result, as he remained comfortably ahead to win his fourth gold medal of the Games. Luck and Poirée both shot clear on their last attempts, and left together, but Luck was clearly stronger, easily outpacing the French to give Germany silver. Rostovtsev was struggling to keep pace with the top teams, and three misses on the final shoot left him no chance, as Russia ended up more than a minute behind in 4th.

The race was held at 11:00.

Rank	Bib	Team	Penalties (P+S)	Result	Deficit
1st place, gold medalist(s)	1	Norway; Halvard Hanevold; Frode Andresen; Egil Gjelland; Ole Einar Bjørndalen	0+5 0+3; 0+1 0+0; 0+2 0+1; 0+0 0+1; 0+2 0+1	1:23:42.3; 22:09.1; 20:17.2; 20:45.7; 20:30.3	–
2nd place, silver medalist(s)	6	Germany; Ricco Groß; Peter Sendel; Sven Fischer; Frank Luck	1+4 0+5; 0+0 0+3; 0+1 0+1; 1+3 0+1; 0+0 0+0	1:24:27.6; 22:20.2; 20:47.5; 21:13.9; 20:06.0	+45.3
3rd place, bronze medalist(s)	4	France; Gilles Marguet; Vincent Defrasne; Julien Robert; Raphaël Poirée	0+3 0+3; 0+1 0+0; 0+1 0+1; 0+1 0+2; 0+0 0+0	1:24:36.6; 22:25.1; 20:22.1; 21:36.3; 20:13.1	+54.3
4	5	Russia; Viktor Maigourov; Sergei Rozhkov; Sergei Tchepikov; Pavel Rostovtsev	0+3 0+6; 0+0 0+0; 0+2 0+1; 0+0 0+2; 0+1 0+3	1:24:54.4; 21:51.4; 20:56.5; 21:24.8; 20:41.7	+1:12.1
5	8	Czech Republic; Petr Garabík; Ivan Masařík; Roman Dostál; Zdeněk Vítek	0+6 0+6; 0+1 0+0; 0+3 0+2; 0+1 0+3; 0+1 0+1	1:26:36.1; 22:42.3; 21:33.4; 21:17.4; 21:03.0	+2:53.8
6	2	Austria; Christoph Sumann; Wolfgang Perner; Wolfgang Rottmann; Ludwig Gredler	0+2 0+7; 0+0 0+1; 0+0 0+2; 0+1 0+3; 0+1 0+1	1:26:58.9; 22:36.3; 21:21.1; 21:35.3; 21:26.2	+3:16.6
7	13	Ukraine; Vyacheslav Derkach; Oleksandr Bilanenko; Roman Pryma; Ruslan Lysenko	1+5 1+7; 0+0 1+3; 1+3 0+1; 0+0 0+2; 0+2 0+1	1:27:02.2; 22:52.2; 22:06.4; 21:10.3; 20:53.3	+3:19.9
8	3	Belarus; Alexei Aidarov; Aleksandr Syman; Oleg Ryzhenkov; Vadim Sashurin	0+3 1+9; 0+1 0+2; 0+0 0+2; 0+2 1+3; 0+0 0+2	1:27:12.0; 22:53.9; 21:22.7; 21:53.1; 21:02.3	+3:29.7
9	15	Poland; Wiesław Ziemianin; Wojciech Kozub; Krzysztof Topór; Tomasz Sikora	1+3 0+4; 0+0 0+3; 1+3 0+0; 0+0 0+0; 0+0 0+1	1:27:35.4; 22:58.0; 21:49.3; 21:26.3; 21:21.8	+3:53.1
10	7	Slovenia; Sašo Grajf; Tomaž Globočnik; Janez Marič; Marko Dolenc	0+4 4+10; 0+0 1+3; 0+1 0+1; 0+1 2+3; 0+2 1+3	1:28:23.6; 23:31.5; 20:45.5; 21:52.0; 22:14.6	+4:41.3
11	12	Estonia; Janno Prants; Indrek Tobreluts; Dimitri Borovik; Roland Lessing	0+4 1+7; 0+0 0+2; 0+0 0+2; 0+3 1+3; 0+1 0+0	1:28:38.2; 22:21.4; 21:27.8; 22:32.2; 22:16.8	+4:55.9
12	9	Finland; Ville Räikkönen; Timo Antila; Paavo Puurunen; Vesa Hietalahti	0+9 1+6; 0+1 0+1; 0+3 1+3; 0+3 0+0; 0+2 0+2	1:28:52.7; 23:14.9; 22:23.7; 21:30.3; 21:43.8	+5:10.4
13	14	Japan; Hironao Meguro; Hidenori Isa; Kyoji Suga; Yukio Mochizuki	0+4 2+10; 0+1 1+3; 0+1 0+2; 0+0 1+3; 0+2 0+2	1:29:04.4; 23:33.3; 21:24.7; 21:55.8; 22:10.6	+5:22.1
14	10	Sweden; Carl Johan Bergman; Henrik Forsberg; Tord Wiksten; Björn Ferry	0+4 1+6; 0+1 0+0; 0+1 0+1; 0+1 0+2; 0+1 1+3	1:29:52.8; 22:58.4; 21:03.8; 22:46.9; 23:03.7	+6:10.5
15	19	United States; Jeremy Teela; Jay Hakkinen; Dan Campbell; Lawton Redman	0+8 2+10; 0+3 1+3; 0+3 0+1; 0+1 1+3; 0+1 0+3	1:30:27.1; 23:06.9; 21:55.0; 23:01.0; 22:24.2	+6:44.8
16	16	Italy; Paolo Longo; René Cattarinussi; Devis Da Canal; Wilfried Pallhuber	0+5 5+7; 0+1 3+3; 0+2 0+0; 0+1 2+3; 0+1 0+1	1:30:56.3; 24:02.2; 21:20.6; 23:38.4; 21:55.1	+7:14.0
17	11	Latvia; Oļegs Maļuhins; Jēkabs Nākums; Gundars Upenieks; Ilmārs Bricis	2+5 1+7; 0+2 1+3; 0+0 0+0; 0+0 0+2; 2+3 0+2	1:32:00.8; 23:54.4; 21:50.3; 22:20.1; 23:56.0	+8:18.5
18	18	Switzerland; Roland Zwahlen; Matthias Simmen; Jean-Marc Chabloz; Dani Niederberger	2+6 3+10; 1+3 0+2; 1+3 3+3; 0+0 0+2; 0+0 0+3	1:32:50.5; 23:30.9; 24:13.1; 21:32.4; 23:34.1	+9:08.2
19	17	Great Britain; Jason Sklenar; Mark Gee; Mike Dixon; Hugh Pritchard	0+9 0+7; 0+3 0+1; 0+2 0+3; 0+1 0+1; 0+3 0+2	1:36:06.0; 24:38.4; 23:17.3; 23:28.9; 24:41.4	+12:23.7
