= Biathlon at the 2002 Winter Olympics – Men's individual =

Men's biathlon individual at the XIX Olympic Winter Games
- Venue: Soldier Hollow
- Dates: 11 February 2002
- Competitors: 87 from 34 nations
- Winning time: 49:03.3

Medalists
1st place, gold medalist(s)		Ole Einar Bjørndalen	Norway
2nd place, silver medalist(s)		Frank Luck	Germany
3rd place, bronze medalist(s)		Viktor Maigourov	Russia

The Men's 20 kilometre individual biathlon competition at the 2002 Winter Olympics was held on 11 February, at Soldier Hollow. Competitors raced over five loops of a 4.0 kilometre skiing course, shooting four times, twice prone and twice standing. Each miss resulted in one minute being added to a competitor's skiing time.

== Results ==
Raphaël Poirée was defending overall World Cup champion, while Sergei Rozhkov was the defending World Cup champion in the individual race. Paavo Puurunen had won the most recent world championships, and Halvard Hanevold had won the 1998 Olympic title. Ole Einar Bjørndalen, who had finished just behind Poirée in the overall world cup, had dominated the test event in 2001, winning all three races, including the individual, beating Sven Fischer. Frank Luck led the World Cup in the Individual entering the Games, having won one of the warmup events, with Pavel Rostovtsev and Daniel Mesotitsch winning the others.

Bjørndalen, having just placed 5th in the 30 kilometre cross-country race, was the earliest of the favourites to start. He missed once on both his second and third shoots, but still had the fastest time, just ahead of Viktor Maigourov, who had missed only once. Neither would miss on the last shoot, but over the final two loops, Bjørndalen would gain more than 30 seconds on the Russian, easily taking the early lead. Poirée was ahead of Bjørndalen with only a single miss on the first three shots, but faded after missing a shot on the last set, ending up 10th. Rozkhov shot clear, but struggled with his skiing, unable to get anywhere near the leaders with his pace on the snow, and ending up 12th.

Just behind him, Ricco Groß was level with Bjørndalen early, and while he did record one of the faster ski times, his two misses meant he finished nearly a minute behind, in third for the time being. Like Rozkhov, Frank Luck also shot clear, and after Bjørndalen's second miss, he was ahead of the Norwegian by 23 seconds. He couldn't match the Norwegian's ski time over the final section, though, ending up just ahead of Maigurov in silver medal position. Hanevold was another who shot clear, but ended up 5th. Frode Andresen, the last starter, and the closest to matching Bjørndalen in ski pace, was ahead of his countryman by 90 seconds after the third shoot, having been clear to that point, but then missed three on the final shoot, sending him all the way down to 7th and securing Bjørndalen's victory. "It was worse to stand here watching Frode shoot than shoot myself," Bjørndalen said.

The race was started at 13:30.

Rank	Bib	Name	Country	Result	Penalties (P+S+P+S)	Deficit
1st place, gold medalist(s)	26	Ole Einar Bjørndalen	Norway	51:03.3	2 (0+1+1+0)	–
2nd place, silver medalist(s)	77	Frank Luck	Germany	51:39.4	0 (0+0+0+0)	+36.1
3rd place, bronze medalist(s)	28	Viktor Maigourov	Russia	51:40.6	1 (0+0+1+0)	+37.3
4	53	Ricco Groß	Germany	51:58.7	2 (0+1+0+1)	+55.4
5	78	Halvard Hanevold	Norway	52:16.3	0 (0+0+0+0)	+1:13.0
6	39	Pavel Rostovtsev	Russia	52:33.5	1 (0+1+0+0)	+1:30.2
7	87	Frode Andresen	Norway	52:39.1	3 (0+0+0+3)	+1:35.8
8	11	Sergei Tchepikov	Russia	52:44.2	1 (0+0+0+1)	+1:40.9
9	50	Vadim Sashurin	Belarus	52:52.6	0 (0+0+0+0)	+1:49.3
10	31	Raphaël Poirée	France	52:52.9	2 (0+1+0+1)	+1:49.6
11	12	Ludwig Gredler	Austria	53:19.3	2 (2+0+0+0)	+2:16.0
12	52	Sergei Rozhkov	Russia	53:43.8	0 (0+0+0+0)	+2:40.5
13	67	Marko Dolenc	Slovenia	53:45.8	2 (0+0+1+1)	+2:42.5
14	48	Jeremy Teela	United States	53:56.5	2 (1+1+0+0)	+2:53.2
15	4	Paavo Puurunen	Finland	54:15.7	3 (1+1+0+1)	+3:12.4
16	61	Egil Gjelland	Norway	54:16.1	2 (0+0+0+2)	+3:12.8
17	27	Alexei Aidarov	Belarus	54:25.3	3 (1+0+2+0)	+3:22.0
18	49	Tomaž Globočnik	Slovenia	54:40.6	1 (0+1+0+0)	+3:37.3
19	55	Vesa Hietalahti	Finland	54:47.0	2 (0+0+0+2)	+3:43.7
20	15	Kyoji Suga	Japan	54:51.9	2 (0+0+2+0)	+3:48.6
21	40	René Cattarinussi	Italy	54:57.2	2 (0+1+0+1)	+3:53.9
22	36	Christoph Sumann	Austria	55:00.3	3 (0+1+0+2)	+3:57.0
23	62	Vyacheslav Derkach	Ukraine	55:01.3	1 (0+0+0+1)	+3:58.0
24	84	Ruslan Lysenko	Ukraine	55:02.1	2 (1+1+0+0)	+3:58.8
25	43	Petr Garabík	Czech Republic	55:12.2	2 (1+1+0+0)	+4:08.9
26	14	Jay Hakkinen	United States	55:13.8	3 (0+2+0+1)	+4:10.5
27	47	Andriy Deryzemlia	Ukraine	55:14.8	1 (0+1+0+0)	+4:11.5
28	34	Robin Clegg	Canada	55:17.5	2 (0+1+0+1)	+4:14.2
29	60	Sven Fischer	Germany	55:23.2	4 (1+1+1+1)	+4:19.9
30	75	Wiesław Ziemianin	Poland	55:35.2	1 (0+0+0+1)	+4:31.9
31	23	Oleg Ryzhenkov	Belarus	55:56.6	4 (0+1+1+2)	+4:53.3
32	64	Wolfgang Perner	Austria	56:00.4	5 (0+2+0+3)	+4:57.1
33	3	Paolo Longo	Italy	56:11.9	1 (0+1+0+0)	+5:08.6
34	30	Alexander Wolf	Germany	56:16.6	5 (1+2+0+2)	+5:13.3
35	8	Roman Dostál	Czech Republic	56:19.6	4 (0+1+0+3)	+5:16.3
35	82	Jēkabs Nākums	Latvia	56:19.6	1 (0+0+0+1)	+5:16.3
37	58	Vincent Defrasne	France	56:20.3	3 (1+1+0+1)	+5:17.0
38	35	Björn Ferry	Sweden	56:20.7	4 (2+1+0+1)	+5:17.4
39	56	Ilmārs Bricis	Latvia	56:24.4	3 (0+2+1+0)	+5:21.1
40	79	Carl Johan Bergman	Sweden	56:24.5	3 (1+1+1+0)	+5:21.2
41	69	Timo Antila	Finland	56:33.5	3 (1+1+1+0)	+5:30.2
42	81	Ivan Masařík	Czech Republic	56:40.6	3 (1+1+0+1)	+5:37.3
43	17	Janez Marič	Slovenia	56:51.9	5 (0+3+0+2)	+5:48.6
44	37	Hidenori Isa	Japan	56:52.8	4 (0+1+2+1)	+5:49.5
45	80	Roland Lessing	Estonia	57:08.4	3 (2+1+0+0)	+6:05.1
46	54	Tomasz Sikora	Poland	57:08.5	4 (0+1+2+1)	+6:05.2
47	71	Henrik Forsberg	Sweden	57:22.0	6 (3+0+2+1)	+6:18.7
48	65	Jason Sklenar	Great Britain	57:27.2	3 (0+1+1+1)	+6:23.9
49	45	Dmitry Pantov	Kazakhstan	57:32.8	3 (1+2+0+0)	+6:29.5
50	76	Wilfried Pallhuber	Italy	57:33.2	5 (0+2+1+2)	+6:29.9
51	2	Marian Blaj	Romania	57:36.8	3 (1+1+0+1)	+6:33.5
52	46	Marek Matiaško	Slovakia	57:37.8	4 (1+0+1+2)	+6:34.5
53	66	Indrek Tobreluts	Estonia	57:52.1	4 (1+1+0+2)	+6:48.8
54	41	Julien Robert	France	57:54.0	3 (1+0+0+2)	+6:50.7
55	22	Tord Wiksten	Sweden	58:02.3	2 (0+1+0+1)	+6:59.0
56	21	Dimitri Borovik	Estonia	58:02.5	5 (0+2+1+2)	+6:59.2
57	68	Zdeněk Vítek	Czech Republic	58:07.9	6 (1+1+2+2)	+7:04.6
58	33	Roland Zwahlen	Switzerland	58:10.6	4 (2+1+0+1)	+7:07.3
59	29	Zhang Qing	China	58:13.9	4 (2+0+0+2)	+7:10.6
60	70	Rustam Valiullin	Belarus	58:46.7	6 (3+1+0+2)	+7:43.4
61	72	Jean-Marc Chabloz	Switzerland	58:59.4	3 (1+2+0+0)	+7:56.1
62	16	Liutauras Barila	Lithuania	59:02.3	4 (0+2+1+1)	+7:59.0
63	24	Janno Prants	Estonia	59:14.0	6 (0+2+3+1)	+8:10.7
64	44	Daniel Mesotitsch	Austria	59:15.9	6 (2+0+2+2)	+8:12.6
65	6	Georgi Kassabov	Bulgaria	59:16.1	4 (2+1+0+1)	+8:12.8
66	63	Hironao Meguro	Japan	59:29.2	3 (1+0+0+2)	+8:25.9
67	51	Ville Räikkönen	Finland	59:34.2	4 (1+1+2+0)	+8:30.9
68	20	Oleksandr Bilanenko	Ukraine	59:34.4	4 (0+2+0+2)	+8:31.1
69	7	Wojciech Kozub	Poland	59:35.1	5 (2+0+1+2)	+8:31.8
70	5	Imre Tagscherer	Hungary	59:51.8	3 (1+0+0+2)	+8:48.5
71	59	Gundars Upenieks	Latvia	59:56.0	5 (2+0+3+0)	+8:52.7
72	85	Rene Laurent Vuillermoz	Italy	1:00:00.7	6 (2+1+1+2)	+8:57.4
73	42	Aleksandr Tropnikov	Kyrgyzstan	1:00:05.3	2 (0+1+1+0)	+9:02.0
74	83	Krzysztof Topór	Poland	1:00:36.8	6 (0+4+0+2)	+9:33.5
75	32	Shin Byung-kook	South Korea	1:00:58.1	4 (1+2+1+0)	+9:54.8
76	73	Dan Campbell	United States	1:00:58.6	6 (2+1+2+1)	+9:55.3
77	74	Ferréol Cannard	France	1:01:32.9	5 (1+1+1+2)	+10:29.6
78	18	Matthias Simmen	Switzerland	1:02:03.0	6 (2+2+0+2)	+10:59.7
79	38	Mike Dixon	Great Britain	1:02:04.9	5 (2+1+1+1)	+11:01.6
80	1	Ricardo Oscare	Argentina	1:02:08.1	6 (2+2+1+1)	+11:04.8
81	19	Mark Gee	Great Britain	1:02:10.2	5 (0+2+2+1)	+11:06.9
82	86	Janez Ožbolt	Slovenia	1:03:16.2	6 (1+2+2+1)	+12:12.9
83	25	Žarko Galjanić	Croatia	1:04:54.4	6 (0+2+1+3)	+13:51.1
84	57	Mihail Gribuşencov	Moldova	1:05:58.5	7 (2+2+1+2)	+14:55.2
85	13	Stavros Khristoforidis	Greece	1:08:09.5	5 (2+1+0+2)	+17:06.2
86	9	Carlos Varas	Chile	1:10:32.2	3 (0+1+1+1)	+19:28.9
	10	Oļegs Maļuhins	Latvia	DNF	4 (1+2+1+ )	
