= Biathlon at the 1998 Winter Olympics – Men's individual =

Men's biathlon individual at the XVIII Olympic Winter Games
- Venue: Nozawa Onsen
- Dates: February 11, 1998
- Competitors: 72 from 29 nations
- Winning time: 56:16.4

Medalists
1st place, gold medalist(s)		Halvard Hanevold	Norway
2nd place, silver medalist(s)		Pieralberto Carrara	Italy
3rd place, bronze medalist(s)		Alexei Aidarov	Belarus

The Men's 20 kilometre individual biathlon competition at the 1998 Winter Olympics was held on 11 February, at Nozawa Onsen. Competitors raced over five loops of a 4.0 kilometre skiing course, shooting four times, twice prone and twice standing. Each miss resulted in one minute being added to a competitor's skiing time.

== Results ==
Rank	Bib	Name	Country	Result	Penalties (P+S+P+S)	Deficit
1st place, gold medalist(s)	69	Halvard Hanevold	Norway	56:16.4	1 (0+0+0+1)	–
2nd place, silver medalist(s)	3	Pieralberto Carrara	Italy	56:21.9	0 (0+0+0+0)	+5.5
3rd place, bronze medalist(s)	70	Alexei Aidarov	Belarus	56:46.5	1 (0+0+0+1)	+30.1
4	68	Ivan Masařík	Czech Republic	57:30.7	1 (0+0+0+1)	+1:14.3
5	45	Ilmārs Bricis	Latvia	58:15.1	3 (0+1+2+0)	+1:58.7
6	28	Ricco Groß	Germany	58:15.4	1 (0+0+1+0)	+1:59.0
7	32	Ole Einar Bjørndalen	Norway	58:16.8	4 (1+0+2+1)	+2:00.4
8	57	Peter Sendel	Germany	58:30.3	1 (1+0+0+0)	+2:13.9
9	8	Oleg Ryzhenkov	Belarus	58:31.3	2 (0+1+0+1)	+2:14.9
10	14	Dag Bjørndalen	Norway	58:34.7	1 (0+0+0+1)	+2:18.3
11	6	Tomas Globočnik	Slovenia	58:55.5	2 (1+1+0+0)	+2:39.1
12	40	Ludwig Gredler	Austria	58:56.5	3 (1+0+0+2)	+2:40.1
13	22	Vadim Sashurin	Belarus	59:08.6	2 (1+0+1+0)	+2:52.2
14	37	Kyoji Suga	Japan	59:15.6	2 (1+0+0+1)	+2:59.2
15	39	Sergei Tarasov	Russia	59:24.3	4 (1+0+2+1)	+3:07.9
16	52	Sven Fischer	Germany	59:26.1	3 (1+0+1+1)	+3:09.7
17	60	Pavel Muslimov	Russia	59:26.5	3 (0+1+1+1)	+3:10.1
18	16	Janno Prants	Estonia	59:38.3	2 (1+0+1+0)	+3:21.9
19	1	Frode Andresen	Norway	59:51.0	5 (1+1+1+2)	+3:34.6
20	72	Mikael Löfgren	Sweden	1:00:00.3	2 (0+2+0+0)	+3:43.9
21	73	René Cattarinussi	Italy	1:00:00.5	3 (2+1+0+0)	+3:44.1
22	34	Raphaël Poirée	France	1:00:08.4	2 (0+0+2+0)	+3:52.0
23	65	Paavo Puurunen	Finland	1:00:11.7	3 (1+1+1+0)	+3:55.3
24	66	Wolfgang Perner	Austria	1:00:14.1	4 (0+1+1+2)	+3:57.7
25	21	Sašo Grajf	Slovenia	1:00:18.2	2 (1+1+0+0)	+4:01.8
26	12	Wolfgang Rottmann	Austria	1:00:23.5	2 (0+1+0+1)	+4:07.1
27	46	Ville Räikkönen	Finland	1:00:25.3	3 (0+0+1+2)	+4:08.9
28	10	Hironao Meguro	Japan	1:00:38.2	2 (1+0+1+0)	+4:21.8
29	49	Alexandr Popov	Belarus	1:00:39.6	3 (0+2+0+1)	+4:23.2
23	23	Wojciech Kozub	Poland	1:00:41.1	4 (1+1+1+1)	+4:24.7
31	47	Dimitri Borovik	Estonia	1:01:07.7	3 (1+0+1+1)	+4:51.3
32	5	Jan Wüstenfeld	Germany	1:01:07.9	4 (0+0+2+2)	+4:51.5
33	48	Mike Dixon	Great Britain	1:01:08.0	1 (0+1+0+0)	+4:51.6
34	20	Jiří Holubec	Czech Republic	1:01:08.8	2 (1+1+0+0)	+4:52.4
35	19	Vladimir Drachev	Russia	1:01:13.9	6 (1+2+1+2)	+4:57.5
35	24	Aleksandr Tropnikov	Kyrgyzstan	1:01:17.7	2 (0+1+1+0)	+5:01.3
37	15	Jēkabs Nākums	Latvia	1:01:40.1	5 (4+0+1+0)	+5:23.7
38	17	Ľubomír Machyniak	Slovakia	1:01:43.7	4 (1+0+1+2)	+5:27.3
39	31	Fredrik Kuoppa	Sweden	1:01:59.2	2 (0+0+1+1)	+5:42.8
40	7	Julien Robert	France	1:02:01.6	1 (0+1+0+0)	+5:45.2
41	26	Wilfried Pallhuber	Italy	1:02:07.7	5 (2+1+2+0)	+5:51.3
42	55	Jay Hakkinen	United States	1:02:10.3	4 (1+1+0+2)	+5:53.9
43	38	Liutauras Barila	Lithuania	1:02:12.2	5 (1+0+3+1)	+5:55.8
44	63	Kalju Ojaste	Estonia	1:02:15.7	4 (2+0+2+0)	+5:59.3
45	71	Atsushi Kazama	Japan	1:02:23.5	4 (1+1+1+1)	+6:07.1
46	13	Thierry Dusserre	France	1:02:26.6	1 (0+1+0+0)	+6:10.2
47	50	Tomasz Sikora	Poland	1:02:39.9	5 (1+0+1+3)	+6:23.5
48	59	Wiesław Ziemianin	Poland	1:02:39.9	4 (2+1+1+0)	+6:23.5
49	53	Dmitry Pantov	Kazakhstan	1:03:10.5	5 (1+2+0+2)	+6:54.1
50	30	Vyacheslav Derkach	Ukraine	1:03:14.6	4 (3+1+0+0)	+6:58.2
51	54	Jean-Marc Chabloz	Switzerland	1:03:41.0	4 (1+1+1+1)	+7:24.6
52	64	Valery Ivanov	Kazakhstan	1:03:55.9	7 (3+2+0+2)	+7:39.5
53	9	Pavel Vavilov	Russia	1:03:59.4	7 (1+2+3+1)	+7:43.0
54	42	Patrick Favre	Italy	1:04:10.5	7 (1+3+3+0)	+7:54.1
55	44	Steve Cyr	Canada	1:04:12.9	6 (0+3+1+2)	+7:56.5
56	51	Petr Garabík	Czech Republic	1:04:28.8	6 (2+2+0+2)	+8:12.4
57	62	Andreas Heymann	France	1:04:42.7	6 (1+1+2+2)	+8:26.3
58	41	Janez Ožbolt	Slovenia	1:05:18.9	5 (2+1+1+1)	+9:02.5
59	18	Dmitry Pozdnyakov	Kazakhstan	1:05:22.9	6 (0+1+4+1)	+9:06.5
60	29	Marius Ene	Romania	1:05:23.9	5 (1+1+2+1)	+9:07.5
61	56	Tomaž Žemva	Slovenia	1:05:27.0	8 (3+2+1+2)	+9:10.6
62	2	Günther Dengg	Austria	1:05:33.9	5 (0+2+2+1)	+9:17.5
63	43	Mykola Krupnyk	Ukraine	1:05:36.3	6 (2+1+2+1)	+9:19.9
64	27	Kevin Quintilio	Canada	1:05:37.2	4 (2+0+1+1)	+9:20.8
65	36	Thanasis Tsakiris	Greece	1:06:38.8	5 (2+1+1+1)	+10:22.4
66	61	Gundars Upenieks	Latvia	1:06:42.6	8 (3+1+2+2)	+10:26.2
67	33	Georgi Kasabov	Bulgaria	1:06:59.5	5 (0+2+1+2)	+10:43.1
68	58	Mark Gee	Great Britain	1:07:46.8	7 (2+2+0+3)	+11:30.4
69	67	Robert Rosser	United States	1:08:35.7	7 (1+4+1+1)	+12:19.3
70	4	Ion Bucsa	Moldova	1:11:27.5	6 (0+2+3+1)	+15:11.1
71	11	Jeon Jae-won	South Korea	1:15:17.8	13 (4+2+3+4)	+19:01.4
	25	Vesa Hietalahti	Finland	DNF		
	35	János Panyik	Hungary	DNS		
