= Estonia at the 1998 Winter Olympics =

- IOC code: EST
- NOC: Estonian Olympic Committee
- Website: www.eok.ee (in Estonian)

in Nagano
- Competitors: 20 (15 men, 5 women) in 5 sports
- Flag bearer: Kalju Ojaste
- Medals: Gold 0 Silver 0 Bronze 0 Total 0

Winter Olympics appearances (overview)
- 1928; 1932; 1936; 1948–1988; 1992; 1994; 1998; 2002; 2006; 2010; 2014; 2018; 2022; 2026

Other related appearances
- Soviet Union (1956–1988)

Estonia was represented at the 1998 Winter Olympics in Nagano, Japan by the Estonian Olympic Committee.

In total, 20 athletes including 15 men and five women represented Estonia in five different sports including biathlon, cross-country skiing, figure skating, luge and Nordic combined.

== Competitors ==
In total, 20 athletes represented Estonia at the 1998 Winter Olympics in Nagano, Japan across five different sports.

Sport	Men	Women	Total
Biathlon	4	0	4
Cross-country skiing	5	4	9
Figure skating	1	0	1
Luge	1	1	2
Nordic combined	4	–	4
Total	15	5	20

== Biathlon ==
In total, four Estonian athletes participated in the biathlon events – Dimitri Borovik, Kalju Ojaste, Janno Prants and Indrek Tobreluts.

The men's individual took place on 11 February 1998. Prants completed the course in 57 minute 38.3 seconds but with two shooting misses for an adjusted time of 59 minutes 38.7 seconds to finish 18th overall. Borovik completed the course in 58 minute 7.7 seconds but with three shooting misses for an adjusted time of one hour one minute 7.7 seconds to finish 32nd overall. Ojaste completed the course in 58 minute 15.7 seconds but with four shooting misses for an adjusted time of one hour two minute 15.7 seconds to finish 44th overall.

The men's sprint was due to take place on 17 February 1998 but was postponed due to snow and fog and instead took place on 18 February 1998. Borovik completed the course in 29 minutes 19.4 seconds with one shooting miss to finish joint-18th overall. Tobreluts completed the course in 30 minutes 11.3 seconds with three shooting misses to finish 36th overall. Prants completed the course in 30 minutes 33.4 seconds with three shooting misses to finish joint-43rd overall.

The men's relay took place on 21 February 1998. Estonia took a combined time of one hour 26 minutes 30.2 seconds with 13 shooting misses to finish 13th overall.

Athlete	Event	Final		
Athlete	Event	Time	Misses	Rank
Dimitri Borovik	Individual	1:01:07.7	3	31
Dimitri Borovik	Sprint	29:19.4	1	18
Kalju Ojaste	Individual	:02:15.7	4	44
Janno Prants	Individual	59:38.3	2	18
Janno Prants	Sprint	30:33.4	3	43
Indrek Tobreluts	Sprint	30:11.3	3	36
Janno Prants; Indrek Tobreluts; Kalju Ojaste; Dimitri Borovik	Relay	1:26:30.2	0+13	13

== Cross-country skiing ==
In total, nine Estonian athletes participated in the cross-country skiing events – Meelis Aasmäe, Elmo Kassin, Õnne Kurg, Jaak Mae, Raul Olle, Katrin Šmigun, Kristina Šmigun, Cristel Vahtra and Andrus Veerpalu.

The women's 15 km classical took place on 8 February 1998. Katrin Šmigun completed the course in a time of 49 minutes 18.9 seconds to finish 13th overall. Kurg completed the course in a time of 52 minutes 8.3 seconds to finish 40th overall. Vahtra completed the course in a time of 52 minutes 32.7 seconds to finish 46th overall.

The men's 30 km classical took place on 9 February 1998. Mae completed the course in one hour 38 minutes 52.3 seconds to finish 11th overall. Olle completed the course in one hour 40 minutes 3.5 seconds to finish 17th overall. Veerpalu completed the course in one hour 40 minutes 9.9 seconds to finish 19th overall. Aasmäe completed the course in one hour 46 minutes 8.8 seconds to finish 52nd overall.

The women's 5 km classical took place on 9 February 1998. Katrin Šmigun completed the course in a time of 18 minutes 48.7 seconds to finish 20th overall. Vahtra completed the course in a time of 19 minutes 41.4 seconds to finish 53rd overall. Kurg completed the course in a time of 20 minutes 58.7 seconds to finish 73rd overall.

The women's 10 km freestyle pursuit took place on 10 February 1998. Katrin Šmigun completed the combined courses in a time of 30 minutes 16.3 seconds to finish 15th overall. Vahtra completed the combined courses in a time of 33 minutes 40.4 seconds to finish 50th overall. Kurg completed the combined courses in a time of 28 minutes 37 seconds to finish 61st overall.

The men's 10 km classical took place on 12 February 1998. Mae completed the course in 27 minutes 56 seconds to finish sixth overall. Veerpalu completed the course in 28 minutes 0.7 seconds to finish eighth overall. Olle completed the course in 29 minutes 52.3 seconds to finish 37th overall. Kassin completed the course in 30 minutes 57.8 seconds to finish 58th overall.

The men's 15 km freestyle pursuit took place on 14 February 1998. Mae completed the combined courses in 41 minutes 38.7 seconds to finish 15th overall. Kassin completed the combined courses in 45 minutes 13.2 seconds to finish 43rd overall. Olle and Veerpalu did not start.

The men's 4 x 10 km relay took place on 18 February 1998. Estonia completed the race in a time of one hour 44 minutes 20.9 seconds to finish 10th overall.

The men's 50 km classical took place on 22 February 1998. Aasmäe did not finish.

The women's 30 km freestyle took place on 20 February 1998. Vahtra completed the course in a time of one hour 31 minutes 9.3 seconds to finish 29th overall. Kristina Šmigun completed the course in a time of one hour 34 minutes 18.1 seconds to finish 46th overall. Kurg completed the course in a time of one hour 34 minutes 59.9 seconds to finish 48th overall.

Athlete	Event	Race	
Athlete	Event	Time	Rank
Elmo Kassin	Men's 10 km classical	30:57.8	58
Elmo Kassin	Men's 15 km freestyle pursuit	45:13.2	52
Jaak Mae	Men's 10 km classical	27:56.0	6
Jaak Mae	Men's 15 km freestyle pursuit	41:38.7	15
Jaak Mae	Men's 30 km classical	1:38:52.3	11
Raul Olle	Men's 10 km classical	29:52.3	37
Raul Olle	Men's 30 km classical	1:40:03.5	17
Andrus Veerpalu	Men's 10 km classical	28:00.7	8
Andrus Veerpalu	Men's 30 km classical	1:40:09.9	19
Meelis Aasmäe	Men's 30 km classical	1:46:08.8	52
Meelis Aasmäe	Men's 50 km freestyle	Did not finish	
Andrus Veerpalu; Raul Olle; Elmo Kassin; Jaak Mae	Men's 4 x 10 km relay	1:44:20.9	10
Õnne Kurg	Women's 5 km classical	20:58.7	73
Õnne Kurg	Women's 10 km freestyle pursuit	28:37.0	61
Õnne Kurg	Women's 15 km classical	52:08.3	40
Õnne Kurg	Women's 30 km freestyle	1:34:59.9	48
Katrin Šmigun	Women's 5 km classical	18:48.7	20
Katrin Šmigun	Women's 10 km freestyle pursuit	30:16.3	15
Katrin Šmigun	Women's 15 km classical	49:18.9	13
Cristel Vahtra	Women's 5 km classical	19:41.4	53
Cristel Vahtra	Women's 10 km freestyle pursuit	33:40.4	50
Cristel Vahtra	Women's 15 km classical	52:32.7	46
Cristel Vahtra	Women's 30 km freestyle	1:31:09.3	29
Kristina Šmigun	Women's 30 km freestyle	1:34:18.1	46

== Figure skating ==
In total, one Estonian athlete participated in the figure skating events – Margus Hernits in the men's singles.

The men's singles took place on 12 and 14 February 1998. Hernits was ranked 17th in the short programme and 20th in the free skate to finish 20th overall.

Athlete(s)	Event	CD1	CD2	SP/OD	FS/FD	Total	
Athlete(s)	Event	FP	FP	FP	FP	TFP	Rank
Margus Hernits	Men's	—N/a		19 Q	20	29.5	20

== Luge ==
In total, two Estonian athletes participated in the luge events – Helen Novikov in the women's singles and Andrus Paul in the men's singles.

The men's singles took place on 8 and 9 February 1998. Paul was disqualified following his first run.

The women's singles took place on 10 and 11 February 1998. Across her four runs, Novikov recorded a combined time of three minutes 29.263 seconds and finished 20th overall.

Athlete(s)	Event	Run 1	Run 2	Run 3	Run 4	Total	
Athlete(s)	Event	Time	Time	Time	Time	Time	Rank
Andrus Paul	Men's	Disqualified					
Helen Novikov	Women's	52.760	52.594	52.204	51.705	3:29.263	20

== Nordic combined ==
In total, four Estonian athletes participated in the Nordic combined events – Magnar Freimuth, Ago Markvardt, Tambet Pikkor and Jens Salumäe in the individual competition and the team competition.

The men's individual took place on 13 and 14 February 1998. Freimuth was ranked 37th in the ski jumping and 27th in the cross-country skiing as he finished 33rd overall. Salumäe was ranked joint-24th in the ski jumping and 43rd in the cross-country skiing as he finished 39th overall. Pikkor was ranked 47th in the ski jumping and 43rd in the cross-country skiing as he finished 41st overall. Markvardt was ranked 44th in the ski jumping but did not start the cross-country skiing.

Athlete	Event	Ski Jumping		Cross-Country		
Athlete	Event	Points	Rank	Deficit	Time	Rank
Magnar Freimuth	Individual	194.5	37	+4:39	47:08.5	33
Ago Markvardt	Individual	181.5	44	+5:57	Did not finish	
Tambet Pikkor	Individual	165.5	47	+7:33	51:46.80	44
Jens Salumäe	Individual	203.5	24	+3:45	48:36.2	39
Ago Markvardt; Jens Salumäe; Tambet Pikkor; Magnar Freimuth	Team	749.5	11	+4:21	63:32.9	11
