= Estonia at the 2002 Winter Olympics =

- IOC code: EST
- NOC: Estonian Olympic Committee
- Website: www.eok.ee (in Estonian)

in Salt Lake City
- Competitors: 17 (14 men, 3 women) in 5 sports
- Flag bearers: Allar Levandi (opening); Kristina Šmigun (closing)
- Medals Ranked 17th: Gold 1 Silver 1 Bronze 1 Total 3

Winter Olympics appearances (overview)
- 1928; 1932; 1936; 1948–1988; 1992; 1994; 1998; 2002; 2006; 2010; 2014; 2018; 2022; 2026; 2030

Other related appearances
- Soviet Union (1956–1988)

Estonia competed at the 2002 Winter Olympics in Salt Lake City, United States.

== Medalists ==
Medal	Name	Sport	Event	Date
Gold	Andrus Veerpalu	Cross-country skiing	15 km	February 12
Silver	Andrus Veerpalu	Cross-country skiing	50 km	February 23
Bronze	Jaak Mae	Cross-country skiing	15 km	February 12

== Biathlon ==
Men

Athlete	Event	Final		
Athlete	Event	Time	Misses	Rank
Dimitri Borovik	Individual	58:02.5	5	56
Dimitri Borovik	Sprint	26:50.1	2	30
Dimitri Borovik	Pursuit	35:33.1	2	26
Roland Lessing	Individual	57:08.4	3	45
Roland Lessing	Sprint	28:34.4	2	70
Janno Prants	Individual	59:14.0	6	63
Janno Prants	Sprint	27:29.2	3	45
Janno Prants	Pursuit	Did not finish		
Indrek Tobreluts	Individual	57:52.1	4	53
Indrek Tobreluts	Sprint	27:31.1	2	48
Indrek Tobreluts	Pursuit	36:57.4	3	41
Dimitri Borovik; Roland Lessing; Janno Prants; Indrek Tobreluts	Relay	1:28:38.2	1	11

== Cross-country skiing ==
Men

Athlete	Event	Final	
Athlete	Event	Time	Rank
Jaak Mae	2 x 10 km pursuit	50:36.2	8
Jaak Mae	15 km classical	37:50.8	3rd place, bronze medalist(s)
Priit Narusk	2 x 10 km pursuit	56:00.7	53
Priit Narusk	15 km classical	43:03.2	57
Meelis Aasmäe	15 km classical	40:31.2	40
Meelis Aasmäe	50 km classical	2:27:18.8	48
Andrus Veerpalu	15 km classical	37:07.4	1st place, gold medalist(s)
Andrus Veerpalu	50 km classical	2:06:44.5	2nd place, silver medalist(s)
Pavo Raudsepp	30 km freestyle mass start	1:23:08.3	60
Raul Olle	50 km classical	2:15:00.0	18
Raul Olle; Andrus Veerpalu; Jaak Mae; Meelis Aasmäe	4x10 km relay	1:36:07.0	9

Sprint

Athlete	Event	Qualifying		Quarterfinal		Semifinal		Final	
Athlete	Event	Total	Rank	Total	Rank	Total	Rank	Total	Rank
Priit Narusk	Sprint	3:01.75	39	Did not advance					39
Pavo Raudsepp	Sprint	3:01.04	35	Did not advance					35
Indrek Tobreluts	Sprint	3:00.02	33	Did not advance					33

Women

Athlete	Event	Race	
Athlete	Event	Time	Rank
Piret Niglas	2 x 5 km pursuit	14:36.9	54
Piret Niglas	10 km classical	32:49.1	51
Kristina Šmigun	2 x 5 km pursuit	26:41.9	13
Kristina Šmigun	10 km classical	Did not finish	
Kristina Šmigun	15 km freestyle mass start	40:33.6	7
Kristina Šmigun	30 km classical	1:33:52.7	7
Katrin Šmigun	10 km classical	31:10.2	42
Katrin Šmigun	15 km freestyle mass start	42:25.6	23
Katrin Šmigun	30 km classical	1:37:02.6	13

Sprint

Athlete	Event	Qualifying		Quarterfinal		Semifinal		Final	
Athlete	Event	Total	Rank	Total	Rank	Total	Rank	Total	Rank
Kristina Šmigun	Sprint	3:20.94	25	Did not advance					39

== Figure skating ==
Athlete(s)	Event	CD1	CD2	SP/OD	FS/FD	Total	
Athlete(s)	Event	FP	FP	FP	FP	TFP	Rank
Margus Hernits	Men's	—		27	Did not advance		

== Nordic combined ==
Athlete	Event	Ski jumping		Cross-country		
Athlete	Event	Points	Rank	Deficit	Time	Rank
Tambet Pikkor	Sprint	96.7	31	+1:42	20:38.1 +3:58.0	40
Tambet Pikkor	Individual Gundersen	213.0	29	+4:33	Did not finish	
Jens Salumäe	Sprint	111.8	7	+0:45	19:29.2 +2:49.1	37
Jens Salumäe	Individual Gundersen	220.5	25	+3:55	48:27.4 +9:15.7	40

== Ski jumping ==
Athlete	Event	Jump 1		Jump 2			
Athlete	Event	Points	Rank	Points	Rank	Total	Rank
Jaan Jüris	Normal hill	79.0	44	Did not advance			
Jaan Jüris	Large hill	74.4	40	Did not advance			
Tambet Pikkor	Large hill	390	52	Did not advance			
Jens Salumäe	Large hill	99.5	16 Q	78.9	49	Did not advance	
