= Biathlon at the 2006 Winter Olympics – Men's relay =

Men's biathlon relay at the XX Olympic Winter Games
- Venue: Cesana San Sicario
- Dates: 21 February 2006
- Competitors: 68 from 17 nations
- Winning time: 1:21:51.5

Medalists
1st place, gold medalist(s)		Ricco Groß; Michael Rösch; Sven Fischer; Michael Greis	Germany
2nd place, silver medalist(s)		Ivan Tcherezov; Sergei Tchepikov; Pavel Rostovtsev; Nikolay Kruglov	Russia
3rd place, bronze medalist(s)		Julien Robert; Vincent Defrasne; Ferreol Cannard; Raphaël Poirée	France

The Men's 4 × 7.5 kilometre biathlon relay competition at the 2006 Winter Olympics in Turin, Italy was held on 21 February, at Cesana San Sicario. Each national team consisted of four members, with each skiing 7.5 kilometres and shooting twice, once prone and once standing.

At each shooting station, a competitor has eight shots to hit five targets; however, only five bullets are loaded in a magazine at one - if additional shots are required, the spare bullets must be loaded one at a time. If after the eight shots are taken, there are still targets not yet hit, the competitor must ski a 150-metre penalty loop.

== Results ==
The race was held at 12:00.

Rank	Bib	Team	Result	Penalties (P+S)	Deficit
1st place, gold medalist(s)	2	Germany; Ricco Groß; Michael Rösch; Sven Fischer; Michael Greis	1:21:51.5; 20:47.1; 19:42.5; 21:11.6; 20:10.3	0+3 1+5; 0+0 0+1; 0+0 0+0; 0+1 1+3; 0+2 0+1	–
2nd place, silver medalist(s)	1	Russia; Ivan Tcherezov; Sergei Tchepikov; Pavel Rostovtsev; Nikolay Kruglov	1:22:12.4; 21:10.0; 20:09.7; 20:40.0; 20:12.7	0+6 0+0; 0+3 0+0; 0+0 0+0; 0+2 0+0; 0+1 0+0	+20.9
3rd place, bronze medalist(s)	3	France; Julien Robert; Vincent Defrasne; Ferreol Cannard; Raphaël Poirée	1:22:35.1; 21:33.8; 19:45.3; 21:02.1; 20:13.9	0+2 0+4; 0+0 0+0; 0+1 0+0; 0+1 0+1; 0+0 0+3	+43.6
4	7	Sweden; Jakob Börjesson; Björn Ferry; Mattias Nilsson; Carl Johan Bergman	1:22:35.1; 21:35.3; 20:20.5; 20:27.5; 20:11.8	0+5 0+7; 0+2 0+2; 0+0 0+3; 0+2 0+1; 0+1 0+1	+43.6
5	4	Norway; Halvard Hanevold; Stian Eckhoff; Frode Andresen; Ole Einar Bjørndalen	1:23:03.6; 21:33.1; 20:22.1; 21:52.9; 19:15.5	2+5 0+4; 0+2 0+0; 0+0 0+2; 2+3 0+2; 0+0 0+0	+1:12.1
6	8	Czech Republic; Ondřej Moravec; Zdeněk Vítek; Roman Dostál; Michal Šlesingr	1:23:04.0; 20:44.6; 20:47.4; 20:57.7; 20:34.3	0+1 1+10; 0+0 0+1; 0+0 1+3; 0+1 0+3; 0+0 0+3	+1:12.5
7	9	Ukraine; Olexander Bilanenko; Andriy Deryzemlya; Oleksiy Korobeinikov; Ruslan Lysenko	1:23:40.4; 21:32.6; 20:10.3; 20:52.7; 21:04.8	0+5 1+6; 0+2 0+1; 0+1 0+1; 0+1 0+1; 0+1 1+3	+1:48.9
8	12	Italy; Christian De Lorenzi; Rene Laurent Vuillermoz; Paolo Longo; Wilfried Pallhuber	1:23:40.9; 20:48.8; 20:05.2; 21:53.2; 20:53.7	0+6 2+4; 0+2 0+0; 0+1 0+1; 0+0 2+3; 0+3 0+0	+1:49.4
9	16	United States; Jay Hakkinen; Tim Burke; Lowell Bailey; Jeremy Teela	1:24:23.4; 20:40.8; 21:05.9; 21:17.1; 21:19.6	0+6 1+11; 0+1 0+2; 0+3 0+3; 0+1 0+3; 0+1 1+3	+2:31.9
10	11	Slovenia; Janez Marič; Janez Ožbolt; Klemen Bauer; Matjaž Poklukar	1:25:01.4; 21:19.3; 20:57.9; 21:39.9; 21:04.3	0+4 1+6; 0+3 0+1; 0+0 0+1; 0+1 1+3; 0+0 0+1	+3:09.9
11	5	Belarus; Alexandre Syman; Sergey Novikov; Rustam Valiullin; Oleg Ryzhenkov	1:25:04.1; 22:04.4; 20:36.0; 21:46.4; 20:37.3	0+6 1+9; 0+3 0+2; 0+1 0+1; 0+2 1+3; 0+0 0+3	+3:12.6
12	17	Japan; Tatsumi Kasahara; Hidenori Isa; Kyoji Suga; Shinya Saito	1:25:15.6; 21:22.0; 20:39.0; 20:48.6; 22:25.9	2+6 0+5; 0+1 0+1; 0+1 0+1; 0+1 0+2; 2+3 0+1	+3:24.1
13	13	Poland; Wiesław Ziemianin; Tomasz Sikora; Michał Piecha; Krzysztof Pływaczyk	1:26:57.0; 20:56.5; 20:01.2; 23:37.6; 22:21.7	0+5 2+5; 0+0 0+1; 0+1 0+0; 0+2 2+3; 0+2 0+1	+5:05.5
14	10	Slovakia; Pavol Hurajt; Dušan Šimočko; Miroslav Matiaško; Marek Matiaško	1:27:44.9; 22:53.5; 21:37.2; 22:11.3; 21:02.9	3+10 0+9; 2+3 0+2; 0+2 0+1; 1+3 0+3; 0+2 0+3	+5:53.4
15	15	Estonia; Dimitri Borovik; Indrek Tobreluts; Roland Lessing; Priit Viks	1:27:48.9; 21:43.0; 21:35.5; 21:20.7; 23:09.7	0+10 2+6; 0+3 0+0; 0+2 0+2; 0+2 0+1; 0+3 2+3	+5:57.4
16	14	Latvia; Jānis Bērziņš; Edgars Piksons; Raivis Zīmelis; Ilmārs Bricis	1:28:10.6; 22:21.5; 21:11.5; 23:55.2; 20:42.4	2+7 3+5; 1+3 0+0; 0+1 0+0; 1+3 3+3; 0+0 0+2	+6:19.1
17	6	Austria; Daniel Mesotitsch; Friedrich Pinter; Ludwig Gredler; Christoph Sumann	1:28:26.4; 23:32.6; 21:50.5; 21:54.1; 21:09.2	1+7 0+4; 1+3 0+2; 0+0 0+0; 0+3 0+0; 0+1 0+2	+6:34.9
