= 2008–09 Biathlon World Cup – Sprint Men =

The 2008–09 Biathlon World Cup – Sprint Men started on Saturday 6 December 2008 in Östersund and finished on Thursday 26 March 2009 in Khanty-Mansiysk. The defending titlist was Ole Einar Bjørndalen of Norway.

The small crystal globe winner for the category was Ole Einar Bjørndalen of Norway.

== Competition format ==
The 10 kilometres (6.2 mi) sprint race is the third oldest biathlon event; the distance is skied over three laps. The biathlete shoots two times at any shooting lane, first prone, then standing, totalling 10 targets. For each missed target the biathlete has to complete a penalty lap of around 150 metres (490 ft). Competitors' starts are staggered, normally by 30 seconds.

== 2007–08 Top 3 standings ==
Medal	Athlete	Points
Gold:	(Norway) Ole Einar Bjørndalen	383
Silver:	(Russia) Dmitri Yaroshenko	291
Bronze:	(Norway) Emil Hegle Svendsen	253

== Medal winners ==
Event	Gold	Time	Silver	Time	Bronze	Time
Östersund details	Emil Hegle Svendsen; Norway	25:42.3 (0+1)	Tomasz Sikora; Poland	25:55.0 (0+1)	Simon Fourcade; France	26:10.4 (0+0)
Hochfilzen details	Emil Hegle Svendsen; Norway	26:08.1 (0+0)	Ivan Tcherezov; Russia	26:34.4 (0+1)	Alexander Os; Norway	26:41.0 (1+0)
Hochfilzen details	Lars Berger; Norway	25:23.1 (0+0)	Alexander Os; Norway	26:01.0 (0+1)	Carl Johan Bergman; Sweden	26:14.7 (0+1)
Oberhof details	Maxim Tchoudov; Russia	25:49.5 (0+0)	Michael Rösch; Germany	26:02.2 (0+0)	Tomasz Sikora; Poland	26:14.7 (1+0)
Ruhpolding details	Ole Einar Bjørndalen; Norway	23:25.8 (0+0)	Dominik Landertinger; Austria	23:59.2 (0+0)	Emil Hegle Svendsen; Norway	24:01.1 (0+1)
Antholz-Anterselva details	Emil Hegle Svendsen; Norway	24:52.5 (0+0)	Bjoern Ferry; Sweden	24:56.1 (0+0)	Tomasz Sikora; Poland	24:59.2 (0+0)
World Championships details	Ole Einar Bjørndalen; Norway	24:16.5 (1+1)	Lars Berger; Norway	24:17.7 (1+1)	Halvard Hanevold; Norway	24:29.0 (0+0)
Vancouver details	Lars Berger; Norway	24:06.5 (0+0)	Ole Einar Bjørndalen; Norway	24:20.6 (0+0)	Christoph Sumann; Austria	24:46.0 (0+0)
Trondheim details	Michael Greis; Germany	26:11.3 (0+0)	Ole Einar Bjørndalen; Norway	26:29.6 (1+0)	Simon Eder; Austria	26:43.1 (0+0)
Khanty-Mansiysk details	Arnd Peiffer; Germany	25:51.1 (0+0)	Ole Einar Bjørndalen; Norway	26:14.2 (0+1)	Christoph Sumann; Austria	26:18.4 (0+0)

== Final standings ==
#	Name	ÖST	HOC	HOC	OBE	RUH	ANT	WCH	VAN	TRO	KHA	Total
1.	(Norway) Ole Einar Bjørndalen	43	29	–	18	60	–	60	54	54	54	372
2	(Poland) Tomasz Sikora	54	43	36	48	29	48	25	26	28	~~23~~	337
3	(Norway) Emil Hegle Svendsen	60	60	–	17	48	60	–	–	30	43	318
4	(Germany) Michael Greis	27	34	40	–	1	36	36	36	60	36	306
5	(Russia) Maxim Tchoudov	16	36	~~8~~	60	31	28	40	14	43	29	297
6	(Norway) Alexander Os	25	48	54	31	29	10	43	~~0~~	40	4	284
7	(Austria) Christoph Sumann	5	32	38	2	30	38	~~0~~	48	22	48	263
8	(Russia) Ivan Tcherezov	34	54	32	–	23	25	3	34	38	15	258
9	(Norway) Halvard Hanevold	30	23	23	16	21	40	48	~~15~~	29	27	257
10	(Sweden) Carl Johan Bergman	31	21	48	24	40	43	~~0~~	29	20	0	256
11	(Sweden) Björn Ferry	6	40	30	23	16	54	1	–	36	32	238
12	(Norway) Lars Berger	11	–	60	0	8	7	54	60	34	0	234
13	(Austria) Daniel Mesotitsch	21	19	28	~~0~~	17	30	12	32	17	28	204
14	(France) Simon Fourcade	48	11	34	0	15	14	38	43	~~0~~	0	203
15	(Austria) Dominik Landertinger	0	0	–	28	54	19	24	–	23	34	182
16	(Austria) Simon Eder	–	–	3	26	9	22	34	21	48	16	179
17	(Czech Republic) Michal Šlesingr	~~0~~	0	11	43	24	32	9	17	16	24	176
18	(Austria) Friedrich Pinter	0	0	19	27	34	24	–	12	27	31	174
19	(Germany) Michael Rösch	~~0~~	17	9	54	36	13	27	0	13	0	169
20	(Russia) Andrei Makoveev	20	12	11	31	~~0~~	0	17	7	25	26	149
21	(Austria) Tobias Eberhard	0	3	29	32	0	31	–	16	14	21	146
22	(Germany) Christoph Stephan	22	4	21	40	4	29	19	~~0~~	0	6	145
23	(Germany) Arnd Peiffer	–	–	–	36	11	16	–	19	0	60	142
24	(Germany) Andreas Birnbacher	–	31	0	38	32	0	–	–	1	40	142
25	(Switzerland) Simon Hallenbarter	0	0	14	–	6	10	32	18	24	38	142
26	(Belarus) Rustam Valiullin	32	9	12	29	2	~~0~~	0	31	0	17	132
27	(United States) Tim Burke	0	–	0	20	0	26	30	0	32	18	126
28	(Italy) Christian De Lorenzi	40	2	0	4	43	0	14	22	0	~~0~~	125
29	(Germany) Alexander Wolf	26	30	23	~~0~~	0	0	0	13	3	30	125
30	(Slovenia) Janez Maric	0	0	~~0~~	0	38	0	31	38	15	0	122
31	(France) Martin Fourcade	–	–	31	0	19	0	23	30	18	0	121
32	(Russia) Evgeny Ustyugov	–	–	–	0	13	34	0	27	13	25	112
33	(Norway) Ronny Hafsas	38	1	–	34	27	–	–	3	0	5	108
34	(Italy) Markus Windisch	36	10	0	10	25	0	22	0	~~0~~	0	103
35	(France) Vincent Defrasne	2	0	43	14	26	12	0	1	–	–	98
36	(Sweden) Mattias Nilsson	0	38	~~0~~	9	0	4	15	23	0	0	89
37	(United States) Jay Hakkinen	18	27	0	25	19	0	–	0	0	–	89
38	(Russia) Nikolay Kruglov, Jr.	19	25	26	13	–	0	0	–	–	–	83
39	(Canada) Jean Philippe Leguellec	28	24	0	–	0	20	0	0	0	10	82
40	(Ukraine) Vyacheslav Derkach	14	0	17	0	–	21	0	10	0	19	81
41	(Slovenia) Klemen Bauer	0	~~0~~	0	5	0	17	28	5	9	12	76
42	(Ukraine) Andriy Deryzemlya	0	7	25	7	–	0	29	4	0	0	72
43	(Czech Republic) Jaroslav Soukup	17	0	0	22	0	0	4	–	5	20	68
44	(Belarus) Sergey Novikov	13	22	15	0	–	0	10	2	6	0	68
45	(Czech Republic) Tomáš Holubec	8	29	~~0~~	0	0	0	0	10	19	0	66
46	(Ukraine) Roman Pryma	15	20	16	0	–	0	13	0	0	0	64
47	(Norway) Frode Andresen	24	0	–	–	14	–	–	25	0	–	63
48	(Slovakia) Pavol Hurajt	7	0	0	0	0	–	21	0	26	3	57
49	(Sweden) Jörgen Brink	0	15	0	0	–	–	–	40	0	0	55
50	(Croatia) Jakov Fak	4	0	0	0	–	–	27	10	8	0	49
51	(France) Vincent Jay	0	13	24	8	0	3	0	0	0	~~0~~	48
52	(Sweden) Magnús Jónsson	10	–	0	0	12	5	20	0	–	0	47
53	(Norway) Stian Eckhoff	–	19	27	–	–	–	–	–	–	–	46
54	(Sweden) David Ekholm	0	0	0	0	0	27	–	6	10	0	43
55	(Italy) Rene Laurent Vuillermoz	0	0	6	0	0	24	2	11	–	–	43
56	(Czech Republic) Roman Dostál	29	0	0	11	0	0	–	–	0	–	40
57	(Germany) Daniel Böhm	–	–	–	12	–	–	–	21	0	7	40
58	(Germany) Simon Schempp	–	–	–	–	–	–	–	24	–	14	38
59	(Estonia) Roland Lessing	0	0	0	–	5	0	0	–	31	–	36
60	(Norway) Hans Martin Gjedrem	–	–	18	0	–	18	–	0	–	–	36
61	(Switzerland) Thomas Frei	0	26	0	–	0	–	0	0	7	0	33
62	(Switzerland) Matthias Simmen	23	0	4	–	–	6	0	0	0	–	33
63	(Germany) Toni Lang	0	14	0	19	0	0	–	–	–	–	33
64	(Russia) Maxim Maksimov	0	6	2	0	20	0	–	1	3	–	32
65	(Norway) Rune Brattsveen	–	–	7	–	–	–	–	–	–	22	29
66	(Sweden) Fredrik Lindström	–	0	–	–	–	–	–	28	0	–	28
67	(Latvia) Ilmārs Bricis	0	0	–	1	10	–	16	0	0	–	27
68	(Czech Republic) Zdeněk Vítek	1	0	0	–	22	–	0	0	0	1	24
69	(United States) Lowell Bailey	0	~~0~~	0	3	0	0	0	0	21	0	24
70	(Ukraine) Olexander Bilanenko	0	0	0	–	0	11	0	0	0	11	22
71	(China) Zhang Chengye	0	0	0	21	0	0	0	0	0	–	21
72	(France) Alexis Bœuf	–	–	21	0	0	0	–	–	0	0	21
73	(Switzerland) Ivan Joller	0	0	0	–	–	0	11	0	0	8	19
74	(Italy) Christian Martinelli	0	0	0	–	0	0	18	0	–	–	18
75	(Austria) Julian Eberhard	0	5	13	–	0	0	–	0	–	–	18
76	(Belarus) Alexandr Syman	12	0	0	0	–	0	6	0	0	–	18
77	(Ukraine) Serguei Sednev	0	0	0	0	–	15	–	0	0	2	17
78	(France) Jean-Guillaume Béatrix	0	16	–	0	–	–	–	0	–	–	16
79	(Finland) Paavo Puurunen	–	–	5	–	0	0	0	–	11	–	16
80	(Slovakia) Dušan Šimočko	0	0	0	15	0	–	0	0	0	–	15
81	(Japan) Hidenori Isa	0	0	0	6	8	1	0	–	–	–	15
82	(Russia) Artem Gusev	–	–	–	–	–	–	–	0	0	13	13
83	(Italy) Mattia Cola	–	8	–	–	–	–	–	–	4	0	12
84	(Estonia) Indrek Tobreluts	9	0	0	0	–	0	0	–	0	0	9
85	(Germany) Christoph Knie	–	–	–	–	–	–	–	–	–	8	8
86	(Belarus) Sergey Sadovnikov	–	–	–	–	0	8	–	0	0	0	8
87	(Kazakhstan) Alexsandr Chervyhkov	0	0	–	0	0	–	8	–	–	–	8
88	(China) Zhang Qing	–	–	–	–	–	–	7	–	–	–	7
89	(Bulgaria) Krasimir Anev	0	0	0	0	0	0	5	–	0	–	5
90	(Estonia) Priit Viks	0	0	0	–	3	0	0	–	–	0	3
91	(Canada) Robin Clegg	3	0	–	–	0	0	0	0	–	–	3
92	(Estonia) Kauri Koiv	–	0	0	0	0	2	0	–	0	0	2
93	(France) Lois Habert	0	0	1	–	–	0	–	0	–	–	1
