= 2009–10 Biathlon World Cup – Sprint Men =

The 2009–10 Biathlon World Cup – Sprint Men will start at Saturday December 5, 2009 in Östersund and will finish Friday February 26, 2010 in Khanty-Mansiysk. Defending titlist is Ole Einar Bjørndalen of Norway.

== Competition format ==
The 10 kilometres (6,23 mi) sprint race is the third oldest biathlon event; the distance is skied over three laps. The biathlete shoots two times at any shooting lane, first prone, then standing, totalling 10 targets. For each missed target the biathlete has to complete a penalty lap of around 150 metres. Competitors' starts are staggered, normally by 30 seconds.

== 2008–09 Top 3 Standings ==
Medal	Athlete	Points
Gold:	(Norway) Ole Einar Bjørndalen	372
Silver:	(Poland) Tomasz Sikora	337
Bronze:	(Norway) Emil Hegle Svendsen	318

== Medal winners ==
Event:	Gold:	Time	Silver:	Time	Bronze:	Time
Östersund details	Ole Einar Bjørndalen; Norway	23:30.1 (0+0)	Emil Hegle Svendsen; Norway	23:55.2 (0+1)	Tim Burke; United States	24:07.3 (0+0)
Hochfilzen details	Ole Einar Bjørndalen; Norway	26:14.0 (0+0)	Nikolay Kruglov; Russia	26:20.7 (0+0)	Evgeny Ustyugov; Russia	26:24.1 (0+1)
Pokljuka details	Ivan Tcherezov; Russia	28:10.0 (0+0)	Dominik Landertinger; Austria	28:21.1 (1+0)	Thomas Frei; Switzerland	28:52.4 (1+0)
Oberhof details	Evgeny Ustyugov; Russia	28:45.0 (0+3)	Michael Greis; Germany	28:47.8 (0+2)	Carl Johan Bergman; Sweden	28:53.2 (0+0)
Ruhpolding details	Emil Hegle Svendsen; Norway	23:27.5 (0+0)	Ole Einar Bjørndalen; Norway	23:30.7 (0+0)	Michael Greis; Germany	24:01.0 (0+0)
Antholz details	Arnd Peiffer; Germany	24:27.4 (0+0)	Dominik Landertinger; Austria	24:33.4 (0+1)	Christoph Stephan; Germany	24:42.5 (0+0)
2010 Winter Olympics details	Vincent Jay; France	24:07.8 (0+0)	Emil Hegle Svendsen; Norway	24:20.0 (1+0)	Jakov Fak; Croatia	24:21.8 (0+0)
Kontiolahti details	Ivan Tcherezov; Russia	24:42.4 (0+0)	Emil Hegle Svendsen; Norway	24:49.2 (0+0)	Martin Fourcade; France	25:12.5 (1+1)
Oslo details	Martin Fourcade; France	26:08.1 (0+0)	Maxim Tchoudov; Russia	26:15.2 (0+0)	Christoph Sumann; Austria	26:17.5 (0+0)
Khanty-Mansiysk details	Ivan Tcherezov; Russia	24:24.3 (0+0)	Christian De Lorenzi; Italy	24:38.1 (0+0)	Andriy Deryzemlya; Ukraine	24:41.0 (1+0)

== Standings ==
#	Name	ÖST	HOC	POK	OBE	RUH	ANT	OLY	KON	OSL	KHA	Total
1	Emil Hegle Svendsen (NOR)	54	32	–	40	60	–	54	54	26	34	354
2	Ivan Tcherezov (RUS)	–	16	60	34	36	24	31	60	23	60	344
3	Christoph Sumann (AUT)	36	38	0	21	31	6	29	40	48	43	292
4	Evgeny Ustyugov (RUS)	2	48	36	60	32	0	26	14	34	26	278
5	Dominik Landertinger (AUT)	13	28	54	0	43	54	7	20	24	29	272
6	Arnd Peiffer (GER)	31	27	32	3	11	60	4	43	21	38	270
7	Ole Einar Bjørndalen (NOR)	60	60	–	27	54	–	24	–	0	40	265
8	Martin Fourcade (FRA)	34	29	–	0	38	38	6	48	60	0	253
9	Simon Fourcade (FRA)	32	31	38	19	40	27	0	11	31	24	253
10	Michael Greis (GER)	40	18	29	54	48	–	20	0	29	13	251
11	Simon Eder (AUT)	28	36	31	2	4	32	30	29	27	7	226
12	Tim Burke (USA)	48	21	34	22	10	20	0	19	0	30	204
13	Klemen Bauer (SLO)	26	0	28	29	29	0	43	0	28	10	193
14	Andriy Deryzemlya (UKR)	24	4	27	20	–	26	40	0	0	48	189
15	Maxim Tchoudov (RUS)	0	43	0	0	34	15	0	28	54	0	174
16	Andreas Birnbacher (GER)	38	9	20	0	8	31	18	0	14	32	170
17	Vincent Jay (FRA)	0	0	7	4	19	19	60	36	18	4	167
18	Christoph Stephan (GER)	43	0	0	0	17	48	22	0	16	21	167
19	Anton Shipulin (RUS)	0	0	40	38	30	43	11	0	–	–	162
20	Björn Ferry (SWE)	0	20	21	–	12	–	34	–	38	31	156
21	Alexander Os (NOR)	23	10	23	31	16	–	–	30	0	19	152
22	Carl Johan Bergman (SWE)	25	24	9	48	6	–	0	4	10	18	144
23	Halvard Hanevold (NOR)	11	34	0	43	14	–	17	0	17	–	136
24	Christian De Lorenzi (ITA)	0	22	0	–	5	16	0	34	3	54	134
25	Daniel Mesotitsch (AUT)	8	0	5	1	21	40	0	0	36	20	131
26	Nikolay Kruglov (RUS)	0	54	11	32	0	29	–	–	–	0	126
27	Vincent Defrasne (FRA)	18	27	0	17	–	36	0	15	0	8	121
28	Serguei Sednev (UKR)	0	0	15	7	–	23	19	24	0	25	113
29	Tarjei Bø (NOR)	–	–	43	16	15	–	–	0	19	15	108
30	Serhiy Semenov (UKR)	–	–	22	25	–	28	8	17	4	0	104
31	Tomasz Sikora (POL)	27	0	0	11	–	30	12	22	0	–	102
32	Thomas Frei (SUI)	4	0	48	0	0	–	28	21	0	0	101
33	Sergei Novikov (BLR)	0	14	26	30	1	–	1	1	1	27	101
34	Jakov Fak (CRO)	0	0	0	–	0	17	48	5	30	–	100
35	Tobias Eberhard (AUT)	0	25	0	6	27	8	–	0	22	9	97
36	Simon Schempp (GER)	0	0	0	0	0	0	–	26	32	36	94
37	Jeremy Teela (USA)	0 3	0	15	23	24	–	32	–	–	–	94
38	Friedrich Pinter (AUT)	–	6	19	0	18	9	–	23	0	17	92
39	Victor Vasilyev (RUS)	16	23	18	0	–	0	–	0	2	28	87
40	Lars Berger (NOR)	17	40	0	28	–	0	0	0	0	0	85
41	Jean-Philippe Leguellec (CAN)	29	0	6	–	0	0	38	10	0	0	83
42	Frode Andresen (NOR)	–	–	24	–	–	34	–	25	0	–	83
43	Fredrik Lindström (SWE)	22	0	17	0	20	–	3	–	7	12	81
44	Pavol Hurajt (SVK)	0	5	0	0	9	11	36	0	15	0	76
45	Aleksei Volkov (RUS)	0	–	–	–	–	–	–	32	43	0	75
46	Jaroslav Soukup (CZE)	0	19	0	–	26	22	0	0	8	0	75
47	Simon Hallenbarter (SUI)	3	13	0	12	3	5	25	–	12	1	74
48	Rustam Valiullin (BLR)	0	30	0	26	0	–	0	0	11	5	72
49	Ilmārs Bricis (LAT)	7	0	–	0	28	–	27	9	0	0	71
50	Janez Marič (SLO)	0	0	0	0	3	0	14	8	40	0	65
51	Michal Šlesingr (CZE)	0	0	0	–	0	12	23	7	0	22	64
52	Matthias Simmen (SUI)	20	0	0	0	0	0	15	0	25	2	62
53	Ronny Hafsås (NOR)	30	0	0	–	–	–	–	31	–	–	61
54	Benjamin Weger (SUI)	–	–	–	–	22	0	0	12	0	24	58
55	Lukas Hofer (ITA)	21	17	0	–	0	0	0	0	0	14	52
56	Alexander Wolf (GER)	0	0	0	0	23	13	–	0	5	6	47
57	Ondřej Moravec (CZE)	0	0	10	–	7	25	0	–	–	–	42
58	Mattias Nilsson (SWE)	15	11	0	0	0	–	–	16	0	–	42
59	Claudio Böckli (SUI)	0	0	12	0	25	3	–	0	0	0	40
60	Magnús Jónsson (SWE)	12	0	0	–	0	–	0	27	0	0	39
61	Alexis Bœuf (FRA)	0	0	–	–	–	0	–	38	–	0	38
62	Markus Windisch (ITA)	19	0	0	–	–	0	0	18	0	–	37
63	Martten Kaldvee (EST)	–	–	0	36	0	0	0	–	–	–	36
64	Hidenori Isa (JPN)	5	0	31	0	0	0	0	–	–	–	36
65	Indrek Tobreluts (EST)	14	1	0	–	0	11	10	–	0	–	36
66	Alexandr Syman (BLR)	0	0	0	13	0	–	21	0	0	0	34
67	Krasimir Anev (BUL)	0	0	16	0	0	–	16	0	0	0	32
68	Paavo Puurunen (FIN)	9	15	8	–	–	0	0	0	0	–	32
69	Michael Rösch (GER)	10	8	0	–	–	14	–	–	–	–	32
70	Dušan Šimočko (SVK)	0	0	–	–	13	18	0	0	0	0	31
71	Daniel Böhm (GER)	–	–	–	0	0	–	–	–	13	16	29
72	Evgeny Abramenko (BLR)	0	–	13	14	0	–	0	0	–	–	27
73	Tomáš Holubec (CZE)	6	0	0	–	0	0	–	–	20	0	26
74	Roland Lessing (EST)	0	0	25	–	0	–	0	–	0	–	25
75	Jean-Guillaume Béatrix (FRA)	0	0	–	24	0	–	–	–	–	–	24
76	Alexsandr Chervyhkov (KAZ)	–	12	1	9	0	0	0	0	0	0	22
77	Marc-André Bédard (CAN)	–	–	0	–	0	21	–	–	–	–	21
78	Timo Antila (FIN)	0	0	–	18	0	0	1	0	0	–	19
79	Vasja Rupnik (SLO)	0	0	4	0	0	0	0	13	0	–	17
80	Ted Armgren (SWE)	–	–	–	15	0	1	–	0	0	–	16
81	Brendan Green (CAN)	0	0	0	–	0	7	–	0	9	0	16
82	Zdeněk Vítek (CZE)	–	–	0	–	0	0	13	0	0	–	13
83	Daniel Graf (GER)	–	–	–	–	–	–	–	–	–	11	11
84	Lowell Bailey (USA)	0	0	3	–	0	0	5	3	0	–	11
85	Mikhail Siamionau (BLR)	0	0	0	10	0	–	–	0	0	0	10
86	Zhang Chengye (CHN)	–	0	0	0	0	–	9	–	–	–	9
87	Priit Narusk (EST)	–	–	–	8	0	–	–	0	–	–	8
88	Michail Kletcherov (BUL)	0	7	0	0	0	–	0	0	0	0	7
89	Roman Pryma (UKR)	0	0	–	0	0	0	–	6	0	0	6
90	Kazuya Inomata (JPN)	–	–	–	–	–	–	–	0	6	–	6
91	Junji Nagai (JPN)	0	0	0	5	0	0	–	0	0	–	5
92	Hans Martin Gjedrem (NOR)	–	–	0	–	–	4	–	–	–	–	4
93	Yan Savitskiy (KAZ)	0	2	–	–	0	0	2	0	–	0	4
94	Mattia Cola (ITA)	0	–	2	–	0	2	0	–	–	–	4
95	Jay Hakkinen (USA)	0	3	–	0	0	0	0	–	–	–	3
96	Priit Viks (EST)	0	0	–	–	–	–	–	0	0	3	3
97	Olexander Bilanenko (UKR)	0	0	–	–	–	0	–	2	0	–	2
98	Rune Brattsveen (NOR)	1	0	–	–	–	–	–	–	–	–	1
