= Aasmäe =

Estonian family name

Aasmäe is an Estonian surname. Notable people with the surname include:

- Hardo Aasmäe (1951–2014), Estonian politician and geographer
- Mari-Liis Aasmäe (:et), Estonian pop-musician
- Meelis Aasmäe (born 1972), Estonian cross-country skier
- Niina Aasmäe (born 1947), Estonian linguist

== See also ==
- Ääsmäe, settlement in Saue Parish, Harju County, Estonia
