= Poland at the 2002 Winter Olympics =

- IOC code: POL
- NOC: Polish Olympic Committee
- Website: www.pkol.pl (in Polish)

in Salt Lake City
- Competitors: 27 (22 men, 5 women) in 9 sports
- Flag bearer: Mariusz Siudek (figure skating)
- Medals Ranked 21st: Gold 0 Silver 1 Bronze 1 Total 2

Winter Olympics appearances (overview)
- 1924; 1928; 1932; 1936; 1948; 1952; 1956; 1960; 1964; 1968; 1972; 1976; 1980; 1984; 1988; 1992; 1994; 1998; 2002; 2006; 2010; 2014; 2018; 2022; 2026; 2030

Poland competed at the 2002 Winter Olympics in Salt Lake City, United States. The two medals won by Adam Małysz were the first for Poland in the Winter Olympic Games since 1972.

== Medalists ==
Medal	Name	Sport	Event
Silver	Adam Małysz	Ski jumping	Men's large hill
Bronze	Adam Małysz	Ski jumping	Men's normal hill

== Alpine skiing ==
Men

Athlete	Event	Race 1	Race 2	Total	
Athlete	Event	Time	Time	Time	Rank
Andrzej Bachleda	Slalom	51.43	53.22	1:44.65	10

== Biathlon ==
Men

Athlete	Event	Time	Misses	Rank
Wojciech Kozub	Sprint	26:31.9	1	18
Wojciech Kozub	Pursuit	36:27.8	4	34
Wojciech Kozub	Individual	59:35.1	5	69
Tomasz Sikora	Sprint	26:59.3	1	31
Tomasz Sikora	Pursuit	35:30.0	1	25
Tomasz Sikora	Individual	57:08.5	4	46
Krzysztof Topór	Sprint	28:02.2	3	61
Krzysztof Topór	Individual	1'00:36.8	6	74
Wiesław Ziemianin	Sprint	27:47.0	2	58
Wiesław Ziemianin	Pursuit	38:45.7	4	50
Wiesław Ziemianin	Individual	55:35.2	1	30
Wiesław Ziemianin; Wojciech Kozub; Krzysztof Topór; Tomasz Sikora	Team relay	1'27:35.4	1	9

Women

Athlete	Event	Time	Misses	Rank
Anna Stera-Kustucz	Sprint	23:24.6	0	43
Anna Stera-Kustucz	Pursuit	36:59.3	4	43
Anna Stera-Kustucz	Individual	54:47.1	4	54

== Bobsleigh ==
Men

Sled	Athletes	Event	Run 1		Run 2		Run 3		Run 4		Total	
Sled	Athletes	Event	Time	Rank	Time	Rank	Time	Rank	Time	Rank	Time	Rank
POL-1	Tomasz Żyła; Dawid Kupczyk; Krzysztof Sieńko; Tomasz Gatka	Four-man	47.22	18	47.48	22	47.93	20	48.10	18	3:10.73	18

== Cross-country skiing ==
Distance

Athlete	Event	Classical		Freestyle		Final	
Athlete	Event	Time	Rank	Time	Rank	Time	Rank
Janusz Krężelok	Pursuit	27:14.6	25 Q	25:30.3	32	51:37.3	32

Sprint

Athlete	Event	Qualifying		Quarterfinal		Semifinal		Final	
Athlete	Event	Total	Rank	Total	Rank	Total	Rank	Total	Rank
Janusz Krężelok	Men's sprint	2:50.67	3 Q	3:00.7	3 ADV	3:00.6	5	did not advance	

== Figure skating ==
Athlete	Event	CD1	CD2	SP/OD	FS/FD	TFP	Rank
Dorota Zagorska; Mariusz Siudek	Pair skating			8	7	11.0	7
Sylwia Nowak; Sebastian Kolasiński	Ice dance	13	13	13	13	26.0	13

== Short track speed skating ==
Men

Athlete	Event	Round one		Quarter finals		Semi finals		Finals	
Athlete	Event	Time	Rank	Time	Rank	Time	Rank	Time	Final rank
Krystian Zdrojkowski	Men's 500 metres	44.117	4	did not advance					
Krystian Zdrojkowski	Men's 1000 metres	1:30.026	3	did not advance					
Krystian Zdrojkowski	Men's 1500 metres	2:23.015	5	did not advance					

== Ski jumping ==
Athlete	Event	Qualification			Jump 1			Jump 2		Total	
Athlete	Event	Distance	Points	Rank	Distance	Points	Rank	Distance	Points	Points	Rank
Adam Małysz	Men's normal hill	Pre-qualified			98.5	129.5	3 Q	98.0	133.5	263.0	3rd place, bronze medalist(s)
Adam Małysz	Men's large hill	Pre-qualified			131.0	137.3	3 Q	128.0	132.4	269.7	2nd place, silver medalist(s)
Robert Mateja	Men's normal hill	90.0	115.5	10 Q	85.5	104.5	37	did not advance			
Robert Mateja	Men's large hill	118.0	111.4	5 Q	117.0	108.6	29 Q	109.5	93.6	202.2	29
Tomasz Pochwała	Men's normal hill	88.0	108.5	22 Q	85.0	102.0	40	did not advance			
Tomasz Pochwała	Men's large hill	110.5	94.4	26 Q	110.5	93.9	43	did not advance			
Wojciech Skupień	Men's normal hill	83.0	97.0	31 Q	83.5	98.0	42	did not advance			
Tomisław Tajner	Men's large hill	112.5	98.0	18 Q	113.0	98.4	39	did not advance			
Robert Mateja; Tomisław Tajner; Tomasz Pochwała; Adam Małysz	Men's large team				104.1; 90.2; 108.6; 132.3	435.2	6	87.3; 93.1; 109.8; 122.7	412.9	848.1	6

== Snowboarding ==
Halfpipe

Athlete	Event	Qualification		Round of 16	Quarterfinals	Semifinals	Finals	
Athlete	Event	Points	Rank	Points	Points	Points	Points	Rank
Marek Sąsiadek	Men's halfpipe	18.8	29	34.0	11	did not advance		

Slalom

Athlete	Event	Qualifying		Round of 16	Quarterfinals	Semifinals	Finals	
Athlete	Event	Time	Rank	Rank	Rank	Rank	Rank	
Jagna Marczułajtis	Women's parallel giant slalom	42.39	9 Q	(Italy) Dagi Mair unter der Eggen W	(Austria) Maria Kirchgasser W	(France) Isabelle Blanc L	(Italy) Lidia Trettel L	4

== Speed skating ==
Men

Athlete	Event	Race 1		Race 2		Total	
Athlete	Event	Time	Rank	Time	Rank	Time	Rank
Paweł Abratkiewicz	500 metres	35.40	16	35.04	16	70.44	16
Paweł Abratkiewicz	1000 metres					1:10.21	29
Tomasz Świst	500 metres	35.72	23	35.55	26	71.27	22
Tomasz Świst	1000 metres					1:09.48	21
Paweł Zygmunt	5000 metres					6:29.71	14
Paweł Zygmunt	10000 metres					13:35.50	14

Women

Athlete	Event	Total	
Athlete	Event	Time	Rank
Katarzyna Wójcicka	1500 metres	2:00.59	26
Katarzyna Wójcicka	3000 metres	4:19.10	26
