= Dani Niederberger =

Swiss biathlete (born 1973)

Personal information
- Nationality: Swiss
- Born: 22 July 1973 (age 52) Wolfenschiessen, Switzerland

Sport
- Sport: Biathlon

Dani Niederberger (born 22 July 1973) is a Swiss biathlete. He competed in the men's relay event at the 2002 Winter Olympics.
