= Günther Dengg =

Austrian biathlete (born 1973)

Personal information
- Nationality: Austrian
- Born: 4 July 1973 (age 52) Schwaz, Austria

Sport
- Sport: Biathlon

Günther Dengg (born 4 July 1973) is an Austrian former biathlete. He competed in the men's 20 km individual event at the 1998 Winter Olympics.
