= Jakob Börjesson =

Swedish biathlete (born 1976)

Personal information
- Nationality: Swedish
- Born: 10 January 1976 (age 49); Kungsbacka, Sweden

Sport
- Sport: Biathlon

Jakob Börjesson (born 10 January 1976) is a Swedish biathlete. He competed in the men's relay event at the 2006 Winter Olympics.
