= Pavel Vavilov =

Russian biathlete

Personal information
- Nationality: Russian
- Born: 20 August 1972 (age 52); Tyumen, Russia

Sport
- Sport: Biathlon

Pavel Valeryevich Vavilov (Russian: Павел Валерьевич Вавилов, born 20 August 1972) is a Russian former biathlete. He competed in the men's 20 km individual event at the 1998 Winter Olympics.
