= Hugh Pritchard =

British biathlete (born 1968)

Personal information
- Nationality: British
- Born: 1 March 1968 (age 57) Whitstable, England

Sport
- Sport: Biathlon

Hugh Pritchard (born 1 March 1968) is a British biathlete. He competed in the men's relay event at the 2002 Winter Olympics.

Pritchard served as a Lance Corporal in the Honourable Artillery Company.
