= Yukio Mochizuki =

Japanese biathlete (born 1971)

Personal information
- Nationality: Japanese
- Born: 23 April 1971 (age 53); Niigata, Japan

Sport
- Sport: Biathlon

Yukio Mochizuki (born 23 April 1971) is a Japanese biathlete. He competed in the men's sprint event at the 2002 Winter Olympics.
