= Žarko Galjanić =

Croatian biathlete (born 1978)

Personal information
- Nationality: Croatian
- Born: 12 October 1978 (age 46); Rijeka, Yugoslavia

Sport
- Sport: Biathlon

Žarko Galjanić (born 12 October 1978) is a Croatian biathlete. He competed in the men's 20 km individual event at the 2002 Winter Olympics.
