= Dan Campbell (biathlete) =

American biathlete (born 1978)

Personal information
- Born: July 11, 1978 (age 48) Minneapolis, Minnesota, United States

Sport
- Sport: Biathlon

Dan Campbell (born July 11, 1978) is an American biathlete. He competed in the men's 20 km individual event at the 2002 Winter Olympics.
