= Andrus Paul =

Estonian luger (born 1975)

Personal information
- Nationality: Estonian
- Born: 21 April 1975 (age 49); Tõrva, Estonia

Sport
- Sport: Luge

Andrus Paul (born 21 April 1975) is an Estonian luger. He competed in the men's singles event at the 1998 Winter Olympics.
