= Ricardo Oscare =

Argentine biathlete (born 1975)

Personal information
- Born: 16 June 1975 (age 49); Rivadavia, Argentina

Sport
- Sport: Biathlon

Ricardo Oscare (born 16 June 1975) is an Argentine biathlete. He competed in the men's 20 km individual event at the 2002 Winter Olympics.
