= Devis Da Canal =

Italian biathlete (born 1976)

Personal information
- Nationality: Italian
- Born: 18 July 1976 (age 50) Vipiteno, Italy

Sport
- Sport: Biathlon

Devis Da Canal (born 18 July 1976) is an Italian biathlete. He competed in the men's sprint event at the 2002 Winter Olympics.
