= Sergey Rusinov =

Russian biathlete

Personal information
- Nationality: Russian
- Born: 14 January 1971 (age 54); Novosibirsk, Russian SFSR, Soviet Union

Sport
- Sport: Biathlon

Sergey Rusinov (born 14 January 1971) is a Russian biathlete. He competed in the men's sprint event at the 2002 Winter Olympics.
