= Carlos Varas =

Chilean biathlete (born 1970)

Personal information
- Born: 14 September 1970 (age 56) Santiago, Chile

Sport
- Sport: Biathlon

Carlos Varas (born 14 September 1970) is a Chilean biathlete. He competed in the men's 20 km individual event at the 2002 Winter Olympics.
