= Raul Olle =

Estonian cross-country skier (born 1968)

Personal information
- Nationality: Estonia
- Born: 23 January 1968 Tartu, then part of Estonian SSR, Soviet Union

Sport
- Sport: Skiing
- Club: SC Sparta

Raul Olle (born 23 January 1968 in Tartu) is an Estonian cross-country skier. He represented Estonia at the 1998 Winter Olympics in Nagano and at the 2002 Winter Olympics in Salt Lake City. He also won the Vasaloppet competition in 2000.
