= Mihail Gribușencov =

Moldovan biathlete (born 1980)

Personal information
- Nationality: Moldovan
- Born: 30 January 1980 (age 46) Leningrad, Russian SFSR, Soviet Union

Sport
- Sport: Biathlon

Mihail Gribușencov (born 30 January 1980) is a Moldovan biathlete. He competed at the 2002 Winter Olympics and the 2006 Winter Olympics.
