= Lawton Redman =

American biathlete (born 1976)

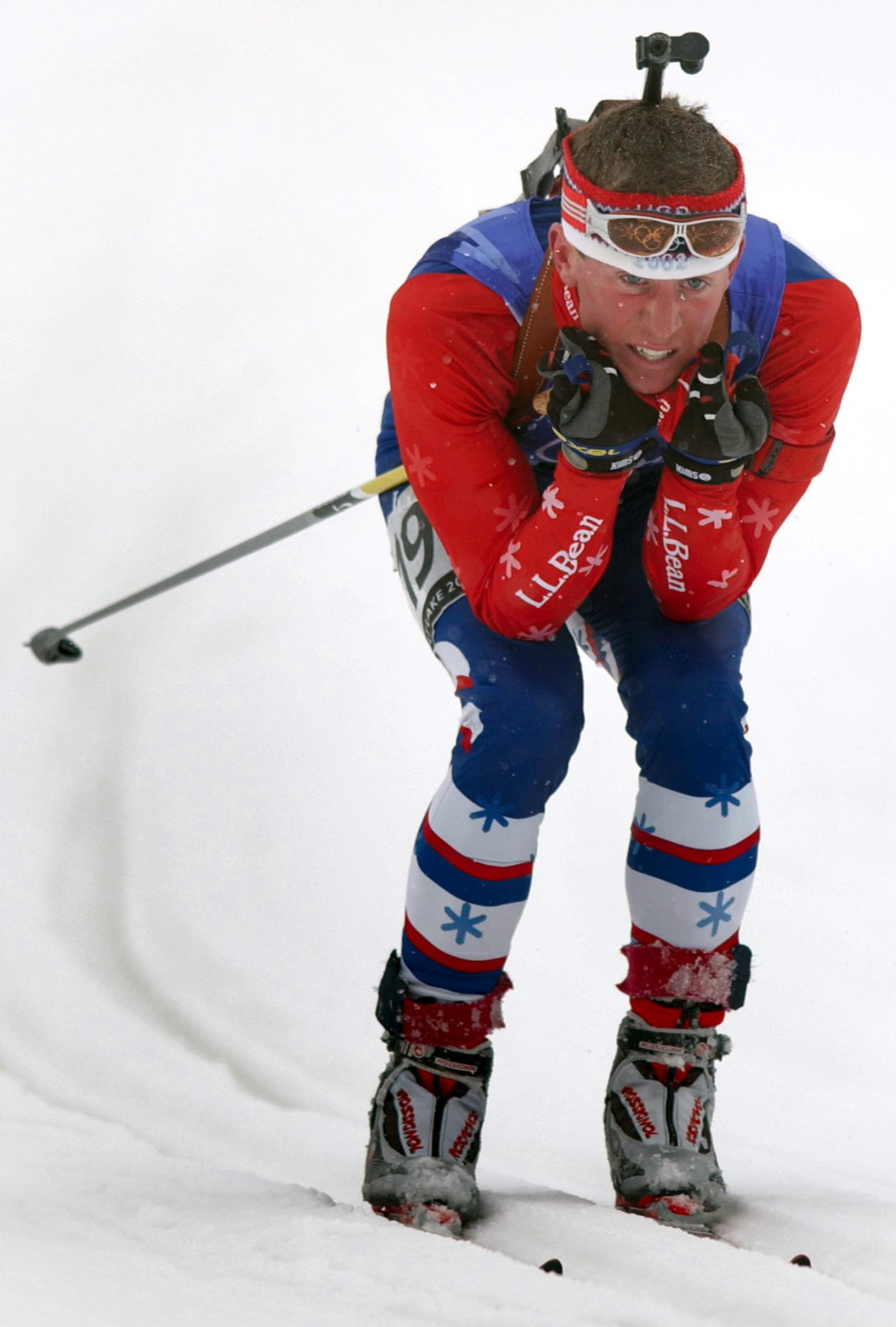
- Lawton Redman at the 2002 Winter Olympics

Personal information
- Born: June 14, 1976 (age 50) Middlebury, Vermont, United States

Sport
- Sport: Biathlon

Lawton Redman (born June 14, 1976) is an American biathlete. He competed in the men's sprint event at the 2002 Winter Olympics.
