= Vyacheslav Derkach =

Ukrainian biathlete (born 1976)

Personal information
- Full name: Vyacheslav Derkach
- Born: 23 June 1976 (age 50) Pryluky, Ukrainian SSR, Soviet Union
- Height: 1.74 m (5 ft 9 in)

Sport

Professional information
- Sport: Biathlon
- Club: Dynamo
- World Cup debut: 8 December 1994

Olympic Games
- Teams: 4 (1998, 2002, 2006, 2010)
- Medals: 0

World Championships
- Teams: 11 (1997, 1998, 1999, 2000, 2001, 2002, 2003, 2004, 2005, 2008, 2009)
- Medals: 0

World Cup
- Seasons: 15 (1994/95, 1996/97–2009/10)
- Individual victories: 0
- All victories: 0
- Individual podiums: 2
- All podiums: 4
Medal record
Men's biathlon
Representing Ukraine
European Championships
Silver medal – second place	2002 Kontiolahti	4 × 7.5 km relay
Silver medal – second place	2005 Novosibirsk	4 × 7.5 km relay
Silver medal – second place	2006 Langdorf-Arbersee	4 × 7.5 km relay
Bronze medal – third place	2001 Haute Maurienne	10 km sprint
Bronze medal – third place	2006 Langdorf-Arbersee	12.5 km pursuit
Summer World Championships
Gold medal – first place	2003 Forni Avoltri	4 × 4 km relay
Silver medal – second place	1998 Brezno-Osrblie	4 × 6 km relay
Winter Universiade
Gold medal – first place	2003 Tarvisio	12.5 km pursuit
Silver medal – second place	2003 Tarvisio	15 km mass start

Vyacheslav Vasylovych Derkach (Ukrainian: Вячеслав Васильович Деркач; born 23 June 1976) is a former Ukrainian biathlete.

== Career ==
Derkach competed in the 1998, 2002, 2006 and 2010 Winter Olympics for Ukraine. His best performance was 7th, as part of the 2002 Ukrainian relay team. His best individual performance was 23rd, in the 2002 individual. In 1998, he finished 50th in the individual and 18th as part of the relay team. In 2002, he finished 36th in the sprint and 40th in the relay. In 2006, he finished 72nd in the sprint. In 2010, he finished 77th in the sprint and 8th as part of the relay team.

His best performance at the Biathlon World Championships, is 5th, as part of the 2009 Ukrainian men's relay team. His best individual performance is 16th, in the 2008 sprint.

Derkach has earned four Biathlon World Cup podium finishes. His best is a silver, as part of the Ukrainian men's relay team in Hochfilzen during the 2000–01 season. He has also won a pair of individual bronze medals, in the pursuit at Pokljuka in 1999–2000 and the mass start at Osrblie in 2001–02. His best overall finish in the Biathlon World Cup is 22nd, in 2000–01.

His last individual competition at the World Cup level was the Olympic sprint in Vancouver, whilst the last relay was the Olympic relay, where he shot cleanly, requiring no spare rounds.

Derkach announced his retirement after the 2010–11 season, citing a hip injury and family responsibilities.

== Personal life ==
Since 2001, he is married to Ukrainian biathlete Oksana Khvostenko.

== Biathlon results ==
All results are sourced from the International Biathlon Union.

=== Olympic Games ===
Event	Individual	Sprint	Pursuit	Mass start	Relay
(Japan) 1998 Nagano	50th	—	—N/a	—N/a	18th
(United States) 2002 Salt Lake City	23rd	36th	40th	—N/a	7th
(Italy) 2006 Turin	—	72nd	—	—	—
(Canada) 2010 Vancouver	—	77th	—	—	8th

*Pursuit was added as an event in 2002, with mass start being added in 2006.

=== World Championships ===
Event	Individual	Sprint	Pursuit	Mass start	Team	Relay	Mixed relay
(Slovakia) 1997 Brezno-Osrblie	23rd	75th	—	—N/a	18th	13th	—N/a
(Slovenia) 1998 Pokljuka	—N/a	—N/a	—	—N/a	15th	—N/a	—N/a
(Finland) 1999 Kontiolahti	58th	18th	32nd	—	—N/a	11th	—N/a
(Norway) 2000 Oslo Holmenkollen	62nd	71st	—	23rd	—N/a	8th	—N/a
(Slovenia) 2001 Pokljuka	28th	33rd	32nd	23rd	—N/a	13th	—N/a
(Norway) 2002 Oslo Holmenkollen	—N/a	—N/a	—N/a	24th	—N/a	—N/a	—N/a
(Russia) 2003 Khanty-Mansiysk	21st	55th	DNS	—	—N/a	10th	—N/a
(Germany) 2004 Oberhof	50th	34th	31st	—	—N/a	7th	—N/a
(Austria) 2005 Hochfilzen	64th	24th	DNF	—	—N/a	10th	7th
(Sweden) 2008 Östersund	39th	16th	27th	24th	—N/a	10th	—
(South Korea) 2009 Pyeongchang	—	44th	49th	—	—N/a	5th	—

*During Olympic seasons competitions are only held for those events not included in the Olympic program.
**Team was removed as an event in 1998, and pursuit was added in 1997 with mass start being added in 1999 and the mixed relay in 2005.
