= Roland Zwahlen =

Swiss biathlete (born 1977)

Personal information
- Nationality: Swiss
- Born: 17 May 1977 (age 47); Bern, Switzerland

Sport
- Sport: Biathlon

Roland Zwahlen (born 17 May 1977) is a Swiss biathlete. He competed in the men's 20 km individual event at the 2002 Winter Olympics.
