= Meelis Aasmäe =

Estonian cross-country skier (born 1972)

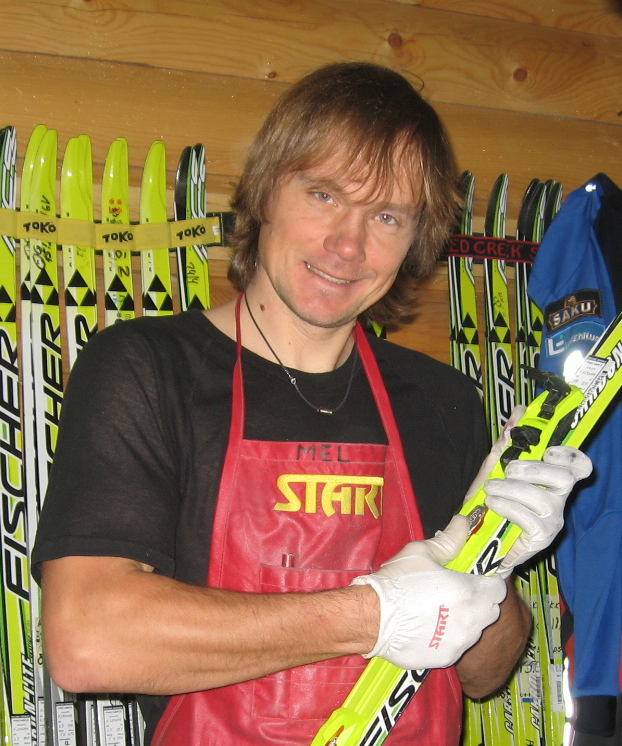

Personal information
- Born: 13 June 1972 (age 54) Palupera, then part of Estonian SSR, Soviet Union
- Height: 182 cm (6 ft 0 in)

Sport
- Sport: Skiing

Meelis Aasmäe (born 13 June 1972 in Palupera, Elva Parish) is an Estonian professional cross-country skier based in Sultsi, Estonia. Aasmäe has to date competed in two Winter Olympic Games in 1998 and 2002 but has failed to achieve a medal in either games. He has also competed on the World Cup circuit for several years but is yet to achieve a podium placing.
