= Timo Antila =

Finnish biathlete

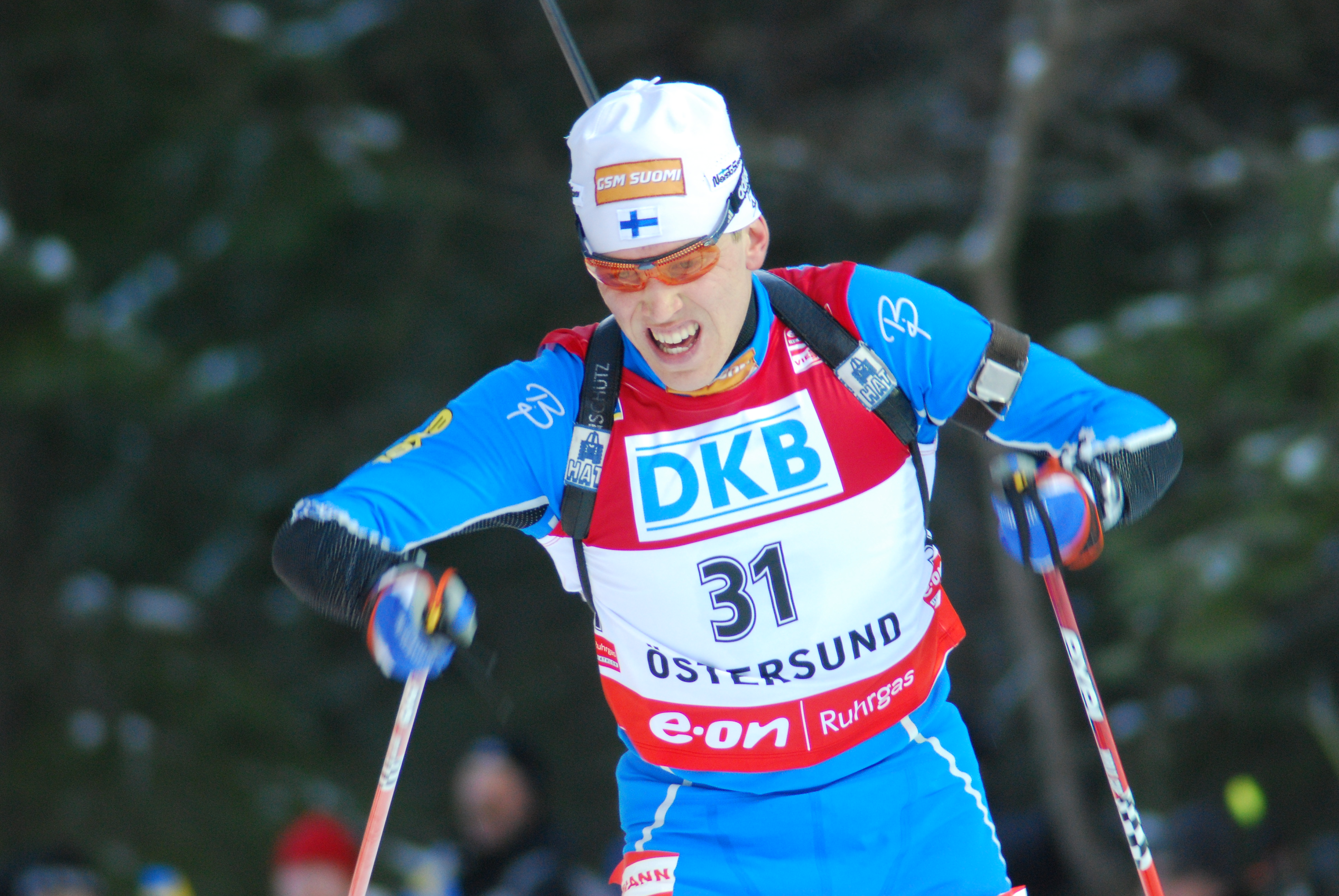

Personal information
- Born: 22 September 1980 (age 45) Jurva, Finland

Sport
- Sport: Skiing
- Updated on 28 February 2013

Timo Antila (born 22 September 1980) is a retired Finnish biathlete. He was born in Jurva.

He competed in the 2002 and 2010 Winter Olympics for Finland. His best finish is 12th, as a member of the Finnish relay team in 2002. His best individual performance is 19th, in the 2002 sprint.

As of February 2013, his best finish at the Biathlon World Championships, is 5th, as part of the Finnish relay team in 2001. His best individual performance in a World Championships is 31st, in the 2008 sprint.

As of February 2013, his best finish in the Biathlon World Cup is 4th, in two men's relay races in 2001/02. His best individual finish is from 2003/04, 14th in the sprint event at Ruhpolding. His best overall finish in the Biathlon World Cup is 50th, in 2003/04.
