= Marko Dolenc =

Slovenian biathlete (born 1972)

Personal information
- Nationality: Slovenian
- Born: 27 September 1972 (age 52); Ljubljana, Yugoslavia

Sport
- Sport: Biathlon

Marko Dolenc (born 27 September 1972) is a Slovenian biathlete. He competed in the men's 20 km individual event at the 2002 Winter Olympics.
