= Marian Blaj =

Romanian biathlete (born 1978)

Personal information
- Nationality: Romanian
- Born: 11 March 1978 (age 47); Bran, Romania

Sport
- Sport: Biathlon

Marian Blaj (born 11 March 1978) is a Romanian biathlete. He competed at the 2002 Winter Olympics and the 2006 Winter Olympics.
