= Jason Sklenar =

British biathlete (born 1970)

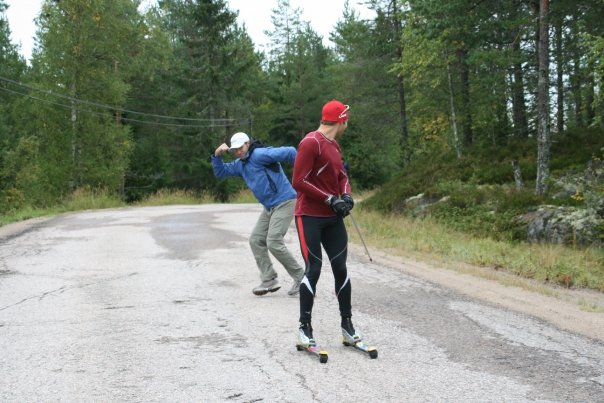

Personal information
- Nationality: British
- Born: 27 March 1970 (age 55); Cheltenham, England

Sport
- Sport: Biathlon

Jason Sklenar (born 27 March 1970) is a British biathlete. He competed at the 1992 Winter Olympics and the 2002 Winter Olympics.
