= Liutauras Barila =

Lithuanian biathlete (born 1974)

Personal information
- Nationality: Lithuanian
- Born: 10 February 1974 (age 51); Vilnius, Lithuanian SSR, Soviet Union

Sport
- Sport: Biathlon

Liutauras Barila (born 10 February 1974) is a Lithuanian biathlete. He competed at the 1998 Winter Olympics and the 2002 Winter Olympics.
