= Georgi Kasabov =

Bulgarian biathlete (born 1978)

Personal information
- Nationality: Bulgarian
- Born: 6 October 1978 (age 46); Samokov, Bulgaria

Sport
- Sport: Biathlon

Georgi Kasabov (born 6 October 1978) is a Bulgarian biathlete. He competed at the 1998 Winter Olympics and the 2002 Winter Olympics.
