= Krzysztof Topór =

Polish biathlete (born 1972)

Personal information
- Nationality: Polish
- Born: 10 January 1972 (age 53); Nowy Targ, Poland

Sport
- Sport: Biathlon

Krzysztof Topór (born 10 January 1972) is a Polish biathlete. He competed at the 1994 Winter Olympics and the 2002 Winter Olympics.
