= Vesa Hietalahti =

Finnish biathlete

Personal information
- Full name: Vesa Tapio Hietalahti
- Nickname: Vesku
- Born: 27 September 1969 (age 56) Kauhajoki, Finland
- Height: 1.80 m (5 ft 11 in)

Sport

Professional information
- Sport: Biathlon
- Club: Kauhajoen Karhu

Olympic Games
- Teams: 4 (1992, 1994, 1998, 2002)
- Medals: 0

World Championships
- Teams: 13 (1990, 1991, 1993, 1995, 1996, 1997, 1999, 2000, 2001, 2002, 2003, 2004, 2005)
- Medals: 1 (0 gold)

World Cup
- Seasons: 16 (1989/90–2004/05)
- Individual victories: 3
- Individual podiums: 12
Medal record
Men's biathlon
Representing Finland
World Championships
| Silver medal – second place | 2003 Khanty-Mansiysk | 20 km individual |

Vesa Tapio Hietalahti (born 27 September 1969) is a Finnish former biathlete

== Biathlon results ==
All results are sourced from the International Biathlon Union.

=== Olympic Games ===
| Event | Individual | Sprint | Pursuit | Relay |
|---|---|---|---|---|
| (France) 1992 Albertville | 6th | 17th | —N/a | 8th |
| (Norway) 1994 Lillehammer | 68th | 52nd | —N/a | 5th |
| (Japan) 1998 Nagano | DNF | — | —N/a | — |
| (United States) 2002 Salt Lake City | 19th | 25th | 22nd | 12th |

*Pursuit was added as an event in 2002.

=== World Championships ===
1 medal (1 silver)

| Event | Individual | Sprint | Pursuit | Mass start | Team | Relay | Mixed relay |
|---|---|---|---|---|---|---|---|
| (Soviet Union) 1990 Minsk | 30th | — | —N/a | —N/a | 12th | 6th | —N/a |
| (Finland) 1991 Lahti | 49th | 43rd | —N/a | —N/a | — | 7th | —N/a |
| (Bulgaria) 1993 Borovets | — | 44th | —N/a | —N/a | — | 15th | —N/a |
| (Italy) 1995 Antholz-Anterselva | 27th | 31st | —N/a | —N/a | — | 10th | —N/a |
| (Germany) 1996 Ruhpolding | 39th | 18th | —N/a | —N/a | 8th | 6th | —N/a |
| (Slovakia) 1997 Brezno-Osrblie | 48th | 49th | — | —N/a | 6th | 7th | —N/a |
| (Finland) 1999 Kontiolahti | 20th | 56th | 42nd | — | —N/a | 6th | —N/a |
| (Norway) 2000 Oslo Holmenkollen | 13th | 22nd | 19th | 22nd | —N/a | 15th | —N/a |
| (Slovenia) 2001 Pokljuka | 27th | 59th | 44th | — | —N/a | 5th | —N/a |
| (Norway) 2002 Oslo Holmenkollen | —N/a | —N/a | —N/a | 15th | —N/a | —N/a | —N/a |
| (Russia) 2003 Khanty-Mansiysk | Silver | 28th | 25th | 15th | —N/a | 11th | —N/a |
| (Germany) 2004 Oberhof | 45th | 23rd | 29th | — | —N/a | 16th | —N/a |
| (Austria) 2005 Hochfilzen | 7th | 27th | 29th | 24th | —N/a | 12th | — |

*During Olympic seasons competitions are only held for those events not included in the Olympic program.
**Team was removed as an event in 1998, and pursuit was added in 1997 with mass start being added in 1999 and the mixed relay in 2005.

=== Individual victories ===
3 victories (2 In, 1 MS)

| Season | Date | Location | Discipline | Level |
|---|---|---|---|---|
| 1994–95; 1 victory (1 In) | 16 March 1995 | (Norway) Lillehammer | 20 km individual | Biathlon World Cup |
| 1995–96; 1 victory (1 In) | 7 December 1995 | (Sweden) Östersund | 20 km individual | Biathlon World Cup |
| 2001–02; 1 victory (1 MS) | 22 December 2001 | (Slovakia) Brezno-Osrblie | 15 km mass start | Biathlon World Cup |

*Results are from UIPMB and IBU races which include the Biathlon World Cup, Biathlon World Championships and the Winter Olympic Games.
