= Paolo Longo (biathlete) =

Italian biathlete (born 1977)

Personal information
- Nationality: Italian
- Born: 3 November 1977 (age 48) Cavalese, Italy

Sport
- Sport: Biathlon
Medal record
Representing Italy
Junior World Championships
Silver medal – second place	1997 Forni Avoltri	4 × 7.5 km relay

Paolo Longo (born 3 November 1977) is an Italian biathlete. He competed at the 2002 Winter Olympics and the 2006 Winter Olympics.
