= Wolfgang Perner =

Austrian biathlete (1967–2019)

Personal information
- Nationality: Austrian
- Born: 17 September 1967; Schladming, Austria
- Died: 1 October 2019 (aged 52)

Sport
- Sport: Biathlon

Wolfgang Perner (17 September 1967 – 1 October 2019) was an Austrian biathlete. The IOC banned Perner for life from competing in the Olympics as the result of a doping scandal at the 2006 Winter Olympics.

== Biography ==
He was a part of the Austrian national biathlon team since 1992. He failed to qualify for the 1992 Olympics in Albertville, but his career improved afterwards, firstly with a third place in Holmenkollen, and afterwards with his first World Cup in Novosibirsk.

Perner competed in four Olympic Games, and won his only medal in the sprint at the 2002 Winter Olympics in Salt Lake City, where he took bronze, behind Ole Einar Bjørndalen and Sven Fischer. This was Austria's first Olympic medal in biathlon. At the 2006 Winter Olympics in Turin, aged almost 39, he came in fifth place in the sprint (he was later disqualified after the discovery of extensively used doping equipment in his hotel room during the 2006 Olympics).

The IOC banned Perner for life from competing in the Olympics as the result of a doping scandal at the 2006 Winter Olympics.
