= Ruslan Lysenko =

Ukrainian biathlete (born 1976)

Personal information
- Nationality: Ukrainian
- Born: 18 May 1976 (age 50) Sumy, Ukrainian SSR, Soviet Union

Sport
- Sport: Biathlon
Medal record
Men's biathlon
Representing Ukraine
European Championships
Silver medal – second place	2002 Kontiolahti	4 × 7.5 km relay
Silver medal – second place	2006 Langdorf	4 × 7.5 km relay
Bronze medal – third place	1995 Le Grand-Bornand	4 × 7.5 km relay
Winter Universiade
Bronze medal – third place	2003 Tarvisio	4 × 7.5 km relay

Ruslan Lysenko (born 18 May 1976) is a Ukrainian biathlete. He competed at the 1998 Winter Olympics, the 2002 Winter Olympics and the 2006 Winter Olympics.
