= Janno Prants =

Estonian biathlete (born 1973)

Personal information
- Nationality: Estonian
- Born: 19 December 1973 (age 52) Võru, then part of Estonian SSR, Soviet Union

Sport
- Sport: Biathlon

Janno Prants (born 19 December 1973) is an Estonian biathlete. He competed at the 1998 Winter Olympics, the 2002 Winter Olympics and the 2006 Winter Olympics.
