= Paavo Puurunen =

Finnish biathlete (born 1973)

Medal record

Men's biathlon

Representing Finland

World Championships
Gold medal – first place	2001 Pokljuka	20 km individual
Bronze medal – third place	2003 Khanty-Mansiysk	12.5 km pursuit

Paavo Puurunen (born 28 August 1973 in Kuhmo, Kainuu) is a retired Finnish biathlete who competed at four Winter Olympics. Puurunen debuted on the World Cup scene in the 1995/96 season. His best overall placing is from the 1997/98 season when he finished 13th. He won his lone World Cup victory in Pokljuka in 2001, in the World Championship, in the 20 km event. His second World Cup medal, a bronze in a pursuit, was from the 2003 World Championship in Khanty-Mansiysk. At the 2006 Olympics in Turin, he took fourth place in the mass-start competition, his best Olympic result. In an ordinary World Cup competition, his best placing has been 6th.
