= Roland Lessing =

Estonian biathlete (born 1978)

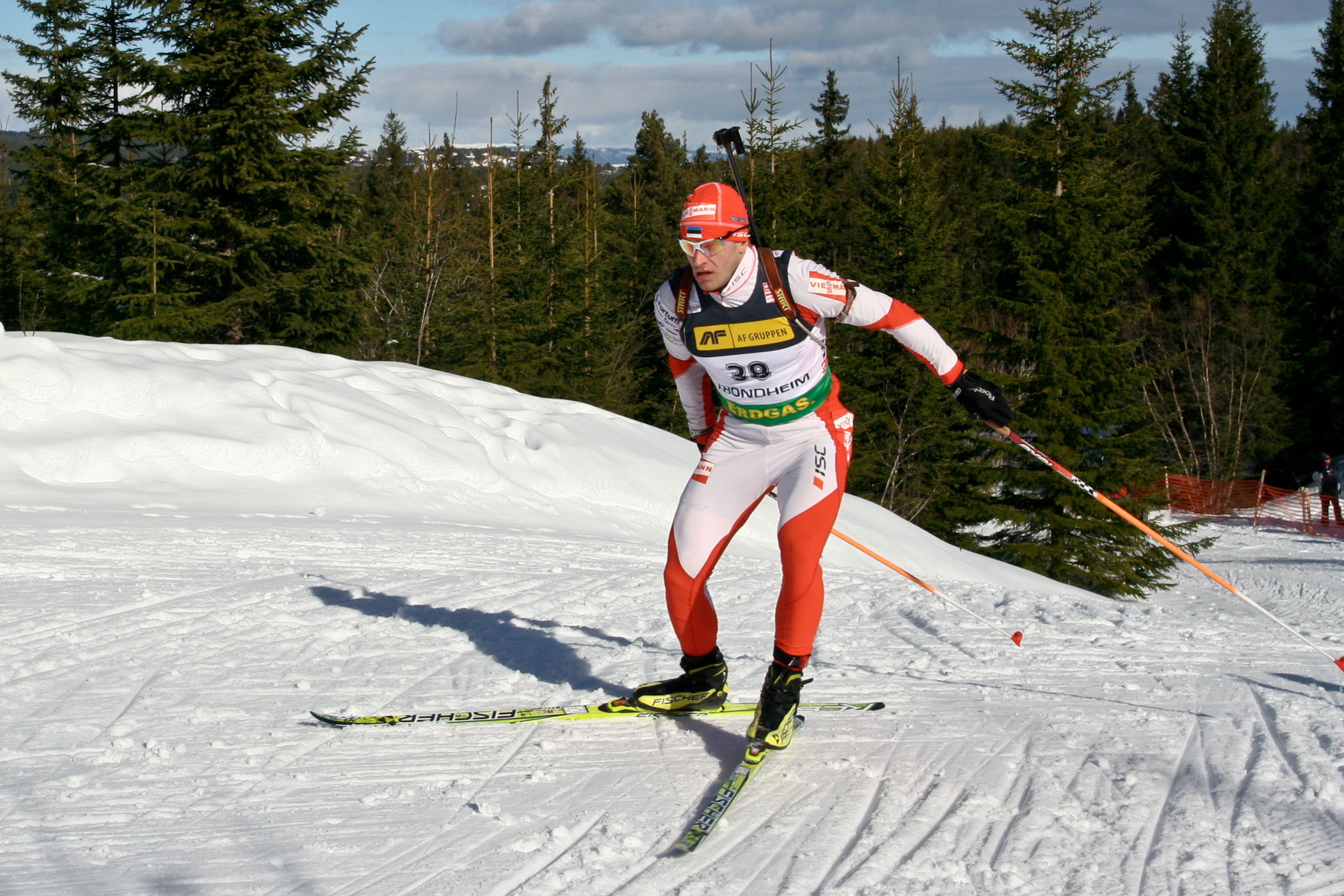

Personal information
- Full name: Roland Lessing
- Born: 14 April 1978 (age 48) Tartu, then part of Estonian SSR, Soviet Union
- Height: 1.83 m (6 ft 0 in)

Sport
- Sport: Skiing

World Cup career
- Seasons: 1998–
- Indiv. podiums: 1
- Indiv. wins: 0
- Updated on 23 January 2010

Roland Lessing (born 14 April 1978 in Tartu) is a former Estonian biathlete. His first World Cup podium was in Pokljuka Pursuit on 20 December 2009.

He represented Estonia at the 2018 Winter Olympics, his fifth consecutive Olympic Games.

== Biathlon results ==
All results are sourced from the International Biathlon Union.

=== Olympic Games ===
0 medals

Event	Individual	Sprint	Pursuit	Mass start	Relay	Mixed relay
(United States) 2002 Salt Lake	45th	70th	—	—	11th	—
(Italy) 2006 Torino	62nd	58th	51st	—	15th	—
(Canada) 2010 Vancouver	65th	62nd	—	—	14th	—
(Russia) 2014 Sochi	—	66th	—	—	17th	—
(South Korea) 2018 Pyeongchang	70th	41st	53rd	—	13th	—

:*The mixed relay was added as an event in 2014.

=== World Championships ===
0 medals

Event	Individual	Sprint	Pursuit	Mass start	Relay	Mixed relay	Single mixed relay
(Austria) 2005 Hochfilzen	84th	50th	40th	—	16th	—	—
(Italy) 2007 Antholz-Anterselva	23rd	42nd	37th	—	11th	12th	—
(Sweden) 2008 Östersund	74th	17th	32nd	—	12th	11th	—
(South Korea) 2009 Pyeongchang	68th	67th	—	—	14th	13th	—
(Russia) 2011 Khanty-Mansiysk	41st	—	—	—	15th	—	—
(Germany) 2012 Ruhpolding	67th	58th	39th	—	18th	15th	—
(Czech Republic) 2013 Nové Město	59th	72nd	—	—	15th	20th	—
(Finland) 2015 Kontiolahti	15th	31st	27th	30th	15th	—	—
(Norway) 2016 Oslo	50th	37th	35th	—	14th	—	—
(Austria) 2017 Hochfilzen	48th	52nd	51st	—	21st	—	—
(Sweden) 2019 Östersund	25th	80th	—	—	14th	—	—

*During Olympic seasons competitions are only held for those events not included in the Olympic program.
**The single mixed relay was added as an event in 2019.

Winter Olympics
Preceded by Eveli Saue	Flagbearer for Estonia; Vancouver 2010	Succeeded by Indrek Tobreluts
