= Dimitri Borovik =

Estonian biathlete (born 1974)

Personal information
- Nationality: Estonian
- Born: 21 January 1974 (age 52) Tallinn, then part of Estonian SSR, Soviet Union

Sport
- Sport: Biathlon

Dimitri Borovik (born 21 January 1974) is an Estonian biathlete. He competed at the 1998 Winter Olympics, the 2002 Winter Olympics and the 2006 Winter Olympics.

== World Cup ==
World Cup rankings

Season	Overall		Individual		Sprint		Pursuit		Mass start	
Season	Points	Position	Points	Position	Points	Position	Points	Position	Points	Position
2001–02	42	??st	36	??st	68	??st	57	??st	-	-
