= Indrek Tobreluts =

Estonian biathlete

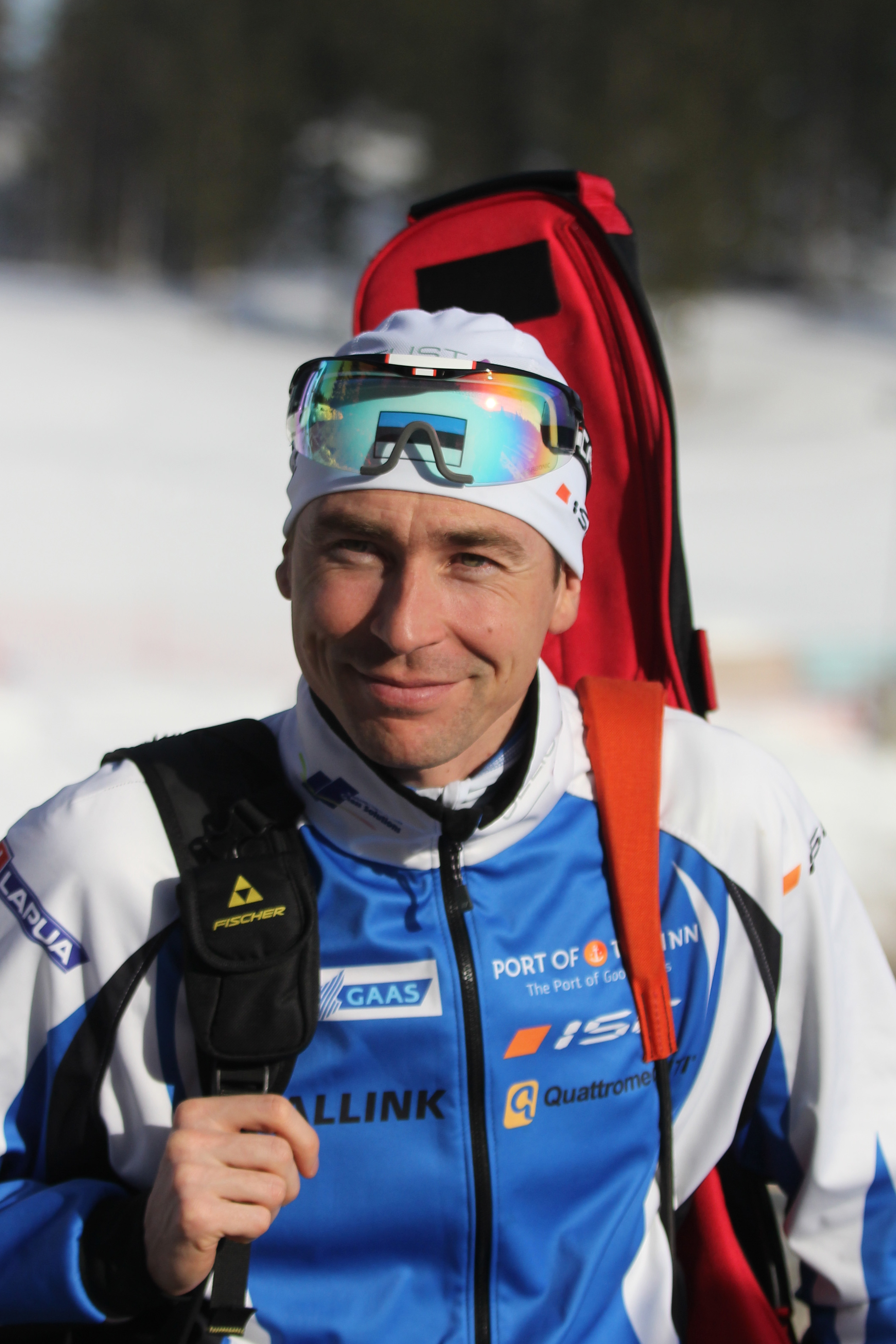
- Tobreluts in 2013

Personal information
- Born: 5 April 1976 (age 50) Tartu, then part of Estonian SSR, Soviet Union
- Height: 1.83 m (6 ft 0 in)

Sport

Professional information
- Sport: Biathlon
- Club: Elva Suusaklubi
- World Cup debut: 19 January 1995
- Retired: 14 January 2016

Olympic Games
- Teams: 5 (1998, 2002, 2006, 2010, 2014)
- Medals: 0

World Championships
- Teams: 15 (1995, 1996, 1997, 1999, 2000, 2001, 2003, 2004, 2005, 2007, 2008, 2009, 2011, 2012, 2013)
- Medals: 0

World Cup
- Seasons: 21 (1994/95–2014/15)
- Individual podiums: 0
- All podiums: 0
Medal record
Men's biathlon
Representing Estonia
Summer World Championships
| Gold medal – first place | 2000 Khanty-Mansiysk | 4 km sprint |
| Silver medal – second place | 2000 Khanty-Mansiysk | 6 km pursuit |
| Silver medal – second place | 2004 Brezno-Osrblie | 4 km sprint |
| Silver medal – second place | 2006 Ufa | 4 km sprint |
| Silver medal – second place | 2006 Ufa | 6 km pursuit |
| Silver medal – second place | 2007 Otepää | 6 km mass start |
| Bronze medal – third place | 1997 Kraków | 4 × 6 km relay |
| Bronze medal – third place | 1999 Minsk | 4 × 6 km relay |
| Bronze medal – third place | 2000 Khanty-Mansiysk | 4 × 6 km relay |
Summer European Championships
| Bronze medal – third place | 2013 Haanja | 6 km pursuit |

Indrek Tobreluts (born 5 April 1976) is an Estonian former biathlete and cross-country skier. He has competed at five Winter Olympics.

== Life and career ==
At the 2006 Winter Olympics in Turin, he finished 15th in the men's relay, 40th in the men's sprint, 43rd in the men's pursuit and 66th in the men's individual. At the 2010 Winter Olympics in Vancouver, he finished 14th in the 4 × 7.5 km relay, 31st in the 10 km sprint and 48th in the 12.5 km pursuit.

After an injury ahead of the 2015–16 season, Tobreluts announced his retirement on 14 January 2016.

== Biathlon results ==
All results are sourced from the International Biathlon Union.

=== Olympic Games ===
| Event | Individual | Sprint | Pursuit | Mass start | Relay | Mixed relay |
|---|---|---|---|---|---|---|
| (Japan) 1998 Nagano | — | 36th | —N/a | —N/a | 13th | —N/a |
| (United States) 2002 Salt Lake City | 53rd | 48th | 41st | —N/a | 11th | —N/a |
| (Italy) 2006 Turin | 66th | 40th | 43rd | — | 15th | —N/a |
| (Canada) 2010 Vancouver | — | 31st | 48th | — | 14th | —N/a |
| (Russia) 2014 Sochi | 29th | 53rd | 45th | — | — | — |

*Pursuit was added as an event in 2002, with mass start being added in 2006 and the mixed relay in 2014.

=== World Championships ===
| Event | Individual | Sprint | Pursuit | Mass start | Team | Relay | Mixed relay |
|---|---|---|---|---|---|---|---|
| (Italy) 1995 Antholz-Anterselva | — | 81st | —N/a | —N/a | 16th | 18th | —N/a |
| (Germany) 1996 Ruhpolding | — | 77th | —N/a | —N/a | 16th | 17th | —N/a |
| (Slovakia) 1997 Brezno-Osrblie | — | 70th | — | —N/a | 16th | 9th | —N/a |
| (Finland) 1999 Kontiolahti | 63rd | 58th | 52nd | — | —N/a | 13th | —N/a |
| (Norway) 2000 Oslo Holmenkollen | 26th | 17th | 42nd | — | —N/a | 13th | —N/a |
| (Slovenia) 2001 Pokljuka | DNF | 67th | — | — | —N/a | 15th | —N/a |
| (Russia) 2003 Khanty-Mansiysk | — | 18th | DNF | — | —N/a | 9th | —N/a |
| (Germany) 2004 Oberhof | 27th | 35th | 22nd | — | —N/a | 14th | —N/a |
| (Austria) 2005 Hochfilzen | 70th | 69th | — | — | —N/a | — | — |
| (Italy) 2007 Antholz-Anterselva | 47th | 20th | DNF | — | —N/a | 11th | 12th |
| (Sweden) 2008 Östersund | — | 30th | 60th | — | —N/a | 12th | 11th |
| (South Korea) 2009 Pyeongchang | 82nd | 64th | — | — | —N/a | 14th | 13th |
| (Russia) 2011 Khanty-Mansiysk | 24th | 43rd | 37th | — | —N/a | 15th | 14th |
| (Germany) 2012 Ruhpolding | 51st | 69th | — | — | —N/a | 18th | 15th |
| (Czech Republic) 2013 Nové Město | 56th | 86th | — | — | —N/a | 15th | — |

*During Olympic seasons competitions are only held for those events not included in the Olympic program.
**Team was removed as an event in 1998, and pursuit was added in 1997 with mass start being added in 1999 and the mixed relay in 2005.

Winter Olympics
| Preceded by Roland Lessing | Flagbearer for Estonia; Sochi 2014 | Succeeded by Saskia Alusalu |
