= 2009–10 Biathlon World Cup – Pursuit Men =

The 2009–10 Biathlon World Cup – Pursuit Men will start at Saturday December 13, 2009 in Hochfilzen and will finish Saturday March 20, 2010 in Oslo. Defending titlist is Ole Einar Bjørndalen of Norway.

== Competition format ==
This is a pursuit competition. The biathletes' starts are separated by their time differences from a previous race, most commonly a sprint race. The contestants ski a distance of 12.5 kilometres (7.8 mi) over five laps. On four of the laps, the contestants shoot at targets; each miss requires the contestant to ski a penalty loop of 150 metres (490 ft). There are two prone shooting bouts and two standing bouts, in that order. The contestant crossing the finish line first is the winner.

To prevent awkward and/or dangerous crowding of the skiing loops, and overcapacity at the shooting range, World Cup Pursuits are held with only the 60 top ranking biathletes after the preceding race. The biathletes shoot (on a first-come, first-served basis) at the lane corresponding to the position they arrived for all shooting bouts.

Points are awarded for each event, according to each contestant's finish. When all events are completed. the contestant with the highest number of points is declared the season winner.

== 2008–09 Top 3 Standings ==
Medal	Athlete	Points
Gold:	(Norway) Ole Einar Bjørndalen	342
Silver:	(Norway) Emil Hegle Svendsen	308
Bronze:	(Poland) Tomasz Sikora	276

== Medal winners ==
Event:	Gold:	Time	Silver:	Time	Bronze:	Time
Hochfilzen details	Emil Hegle Svendsen; Norway	34:36.7 (0+0+0+1)	Simon Eder; Austria	34:38.3 (0+1+0+0)	Ole Einar Bjørndalen; Norway	34:39.8 (0+1+2+0)
Pokljuka details	Evgeny Ustyugov; Russia	34:50.9 (0+1+1+0)	Roland Lessing; Estonia	35:00.2 (0+0+0+0)	Simon Eder; Austria	35:01.8 (1+0+0+1)
Antholz details	Daniel Mesotitsch; Austria	31:50.4 (0+0+0+1)	Arnd Peiffer; Germany	31:52.1 (0+1+0+0)	Dominik Landertinger; Austria	32:10.1 (1+1+1+0)
2010 Winter Olympics details	Björn Ferry; Sweden	33:38.4 (0+0+0+1)	Christoph Sumann; Austria	33:54.9 (0+0+1+1)	Vincent Jay; France	34:06.6 (0+0+1+1)
Kontiolahti details	Martin Fourcade; France	32:35.1 (1+0+0+0)	Christian De Lorenzi; Italy	32:45.2 (0+0+0+1)	Vincent Jay; France	32:50.7 (0+0+0+0)
Oslo details	Martin Fourcade; France	33:46.9 (1+0+1+1)	Simon Schempp; Germany	33:55.9 (0+0+0+0)	Ivan Tcherezov; Russia	34:13.1 (0+0+0+1)

== Standings ==
#	Name	HOC	POK	ANT	OLY	KON	OSL	Total
1	Martin Fourcade (FRA)	27	–	43	7	60	60	197
2	Simon Eder (AUT)	54	48	23	43	28	~~13~~	196
3	Ivan Tcherezov (RUS)	~~19~~	34	29	38	40	48	189
4	Evgeny Ustyugov (RUS)	40	60	~~2~~	26	20	38	184
5	Dominik Landertinger (AUT)	~~21~~	43	48	27	26	40	184
6	Christoph Sumann (AUT)	43	–	30	54	25	27	179
7	Vincent Jay (FRA)	–	30	25	48	48	23	174
8	Emil Hegle Svendsen (NOR)	60	–	–	34	36	43	173
9	Arnd Peiffer (GER)	14	40	54	~~4~~	32	20	160
10	Björn Ferry (SWE)	36	27	–	60	–	34	157
11	Simon Fourcade (FRA)	34	32	34	–	22	32	154
12	Daniel Mesotitsch (AUT)	25	12	60	0	9	29	135
13	Simon Schempp (GER)	8	31	–	–	29	54	122
14	Tomasz Sikora (POL)	–	25	38	23	30	–	116
15	Andreas Birnbacher (GER)	13	2	28	28	18	25	114
16	Ole Einar Bjørndalen (NOR)	48	–	–	36	–	24	108
17	Carl Johan Bergman (SWE)	20	4	–	22	43	9	98
18	Klemen Bauer (SLO)	–	36	3	32	24	0	95
19	Christian De Lorenzi (ITA)	29	–	11	–	54	0	94
20	Sergey Novikov (BLR)	23	19	–	20	13	18	93
21	Tim Burke (USA)	31	38	–	0	0	17	86
22	Serguei Sednev (UKR)	–	23	32	31	0	–	86
23	Anton Shipulin (RUS)	11	16	36	21	–	–	84
24	Jean-Philippe Leguellec (CAN)	–	28	8	30	16	–	82
25	Pavol Hurajt (SVK)	0	–	14	25	34	7	80
26	Nikolay Kruglov (RUS)	38	15	26	–	–	–	79
27	Jakov Fak (CRO)	–	–	24	16	7	30	77
28	Michael Greis (GER)	15	–	–	40	–	21	76
29	Lars Berger (NOR)	32	26	–	18	0	–	76
30	Maxim Tchoudov (RUS)	28	–	0	–	19	26	73
31	Michal Šlesingr (CZE)	2	0	0	12	38	19	71
32	Halvard Hanevold (NOR)	30	17	–	24	0	–	71
33	Vincent Defrasne (FRA)	22	–	19	19	6	–	66
34	Friedrich Pinter (AUT)	18	18	13	–	17	0	66
35	Fredrik Lindström (SWE)	0	21	–	8	–	31	60
36	Roland Lessing (EST)	–	54	–	–	–	0	54
37	Alexander Os (NOR)	0	24	–	–	27	2	53
38	Christoph Stephan (GER)	–	–	40	11	–	0	51
39	Jaroslav Soukup (CZE)	17	8	22	0	–	3	50
40	Janez Maric (SLO)	0	6	0	0	11	28	45
41	Frode Andresen (NOR)	–	22	18	–	4	–	44
42	Alexander Wolf (GER)	–	11	17	–	0	16	44
43	Thomas Frei (SUI)	–	0	–	29	14	–	43
44	Simon Hallenbarter (SUI)	0	–	21	0	–	22	43
45	Tobias Eberhard (AUT)	0	–	31	–	–	11	42
46	Serhiy Semenov (UKR)	–	20	0	2	12	6	40
47	Victor Vasilyev (RUS)	10	0	–	–	15	15	40
48	Andriy Deryzemlya (UKR)	12	7	6	15	–	–	40
49	Brendan Green (CAN)	0	0	27	–	–	12	39
50	Alexey Volkov (RUS)	–	–	–	–	1	36	37
51	Paavo Puurunen (FIN)	16	14	7	–	–	0	37
52	Lukas Hofer (ITA)	26	–	9	0	–	–	35
53	Tarjei Bø (NOR)	–	29	–	–	–	4	33
54	Alexsandr Chervyhkov (KAZ)	9	13	0	0	10	–	32
55	Magnús Jónsson (SWE)	0	0	–	–	31	–	31
56	Mattias Nilsson (SWE)	24	–	–	–	5	–	29
57	Jeremy Teela (USA)	–	10	–	17	–	–	27
58	Benjamin Weger (SUI)	–	–	–	–	23	1	24
59	Rustam Valiullin (BLR)	6	–	–	0	8	8	22
60	Alexis Bœuf (FRA)	–	–	–	–	21	–	21
61	Hans Martin Gjedrem (NOR)	–	0	20	–	–	–	20
62	Matthias Simmen (SUI)	4	0	0	13	0	0	17
63	Dušan Šimočko (SVK)	–	–	16	–	–	–	16
64	Mattia Cola (ITA)	–	0	15	0	–	–	15
65	Yan Savitskiy (KAZ)	0	–	–	14	0	–	14
66	Tomas Holubec (CZE)	0	–	–	–	–	14	14
67	Ted Armgren (SWE)	–	–	12	–	–	–	12
68	Alexandr Syman (BLR)	1	–	–	10	–	–	11
69	Ondřej Moravec (CZE)	0	0	10	–	–	–	10
70	Kazuya Inomata (JPN)	–	–	–	–	–	10	10
71	Olexander Bilanenko (UKR)	7	–	1	–	2	–	10
72	Ilmārs Bricis (ITA)	–	–	–	9	0	–	9
73	Krasimir Anev (BUL)	–	9	–	0	–	–	9
74	Zhang Chengye (CHN)	–	0	–	6	–	–	6
75	Zdeněk Vítek (CZE)	–	–	0	3	3	–	6
76	Michail Kletcherov (BUL)	5	–	–	0	–	–	5
77	Vasja Rupnik (SLO)	0	5	–	0	0	–	5
78	Lowell Bailey (USA)	–	0	–	5	0	–	5
79	Tanguy Roche (FRA)	–	–	–	–	–	5	5
79	Vitali Tsvetau (BLR)	–	–	5	–	–		5
81	Claudio Böckli (SUI)	0	0	4	–	0	0	4
82	Michael Rösch (GER)	3	–	0	–	–	–	3
83	Ronny Hafsås (NOR)	0	3	–	–	0	–	3
84	Evgeny Abramenko (BLR)	–	1	–	1	–	–	2
