= 2008–09 Biathlon World Cup – Pursuit Men =

The 2008-09 Biathlon World Cup/Pursuit Men started at Sunday December 7, 2008 in Östersund and will finish Saturday March 28, 2009 in Khanty-Mansiysk. Defending titlist is Ole Einar Bjørndalen of Norway.

== Competition format ==
In a pursuit, biathletes' starts are separated by their time differences from a previous race, most commonly a sprint. The contestant crossing the finish line first is the winner. The distance is 12.5 kilometres (7.8 mi), skied over five laps; there are four shooting bouts (two prone, two standing, in that order), and each miss means a penalty loop of 150 m. To prevent awkward and/or dangerous crowding of the skiing loops, and overcapacity at the shooting range, World Cup Pursuits are held with only the 60 top ranking biathletes after the preceding race. The biathletes shoot (on a first-come, first-served basis) at the lane corresponding to the position they arrived for all shooting bouts.

== 2007-08 Top 3 Standings ==
Medal	Athlete	Points
Gold:	(Norway) Ole Einar Bjørndalen	247
Silver:	(Russia) Dmitri Yaroshenko	233
Bronze:	(Sweden) Björn Ferry	221

== Medal winners ==
Event:	Gold:	Time	Silver:	Time	Bronze:	Time
Östersund	Tomasz Sikora; Poland	34:55.5 (0+2+0+1)	Ole Einar Bjørndalen; Norway	34:58.0 (1+2+0+0)	Emil Hegle Svendsen; Norway	35:00.4 (0+1+2+0)
Hochfilzen	Emil Hegle Svendsen; Norway	35:46.3 (1+0+1+1)	Ole Einar Bjørndalen; Norway	35:55.7 (0+0+2+0)	Tomasz Sikora; Poland	35:58.35 (1+0+0+2)
Ruhpolding	Ole Einar Bjørndalen; Norway	36:17.4 (0+1+0+0)	Emil Hegle Svendsen; Norway	36:51.8 (1+0+0+0)	Dominik Landertinger; Austria	37:03.9 (1+1+0+0)
Antholz	Björn Ferry; Sweden	33:19.4 (0+0+1+0)	Simon Eder; Austria	33:37.0 (0+0+0+0)	Emil Hegle Svendsen; Norway	33:44.1 (1+0+1+1)
World Championships	Ole Einar Bjørndalen; Norway	31:46.70 (0+2+0+2)	Maxim Tchoudov; Russia	32:28.40 (0+0+1+2)	Alexander Os; Norway	32:39.50 (0+0+2+1)
Trondheim	Ole Einar Bjørndalen; Norway	33:36.3 (1+0+1+0)	Simon Eder; Austria	34:01.4 (0+0+1+0)	Tomasz Sikora; Poland	34:01.6 (0+1+1+0)
Khanty-Mansiysk	Emil Hegle Svendsen; Norway	33:03.3 (0+0+1+1)	Ole Einar Bjørndalen; Norway	33:03.4 (1+0+0+1)	Christoph Sumann; Austria	33:27.1 (0+0+2+0)

== Final standings ==
#	Name	ÖST	HOC	RUH	ANT	WCH	TRO	KHA	Total
1.	(Norway) Ole Einar Bjørndalen	54	54	60	–	60	60	54	342
2	(Norway) Emil Hegle Svendsen	48	60	54	48	–	38	60	308
3	(Poland) Tomasz Sikora	60	48	34	43	43	48	~~32~~	276
4	(Germany) Michael Greis	43	36	~~27~~	38	28	43	43	231
5	(Sweden) Björn Ferry	31	40	~~7~~	60	10	34	40	215
6	(Austria) Simon Eder	–	–	23	54	27	54	28	186
7	(Russia) Maxim Tchoudov	29	27	21	26	54	~~17~~	29	186
8	(Russia) Ivan Tcherezov	23	~~2~~	40	34	15	29	19	160
9	(Austria) Christoph Sumann	9	32	32	32	–	6	48	159
10	(Czech Republic) Michal Šlesingr	–	0	30	27	22	40	38	157
11	(Norway) Halvard Hanevold	38	20	–	24	38	36	0	156
12	(Austria) Dominik Landertinger	19	–	48	25	7	31	14	144
13	(Norway) Alexander Os	27	18	–	11	48	32	7	143
14	(France) Simon Fourcade	40	0	29	22	31	–	21	143
15	(Germany) Michael Rösch	–	13	38	31	32	27	0	141
16	(Sweden) Carl Johan Bergman	22	29	43	23	–	19	3	138
17	(Germany) Alexander Wolf	34	30	~~6~~	20	23	8	13	128
18	(Austria) Daniel Mesotitsch	25	~~8~~	13	28	17	12	27	122
19	(France) Martin Fourcade	–	–	26	16	34	20	22	118
20	(Canada) Jean Philippe Leguellec	24	34	18	36	~~0~~	0	5	117
21	(United States) Tim Burke	–	–5	–	30	20	28	34	112
22	(Russia) Evgeny Ustyugov	–	–	19	19	21	15	36	110
23	(Norway) Lars Berger	3	–	36	–	40	21	–	100
24	(Italy) Christian De Lorenzi	5	38	24	0	29	–	–	96
25	(Italy) Markus Windisch	26	22	25	–	18	–	–	91
26	(Russia) Nikolay Kruglov, Jr.	32	43	–	9	–	–	–	83
27	(Germany) Andreas Birnbacher	–	7	20	–	–	25	30	82
28	(Czech Republic) Jaroslav Soukup	18	–	2	17	0	30	10	77
29	(Czech Republic) Zdeněk Vítek	14	14	17	–	13	18	0	76
30	(Austria) Friedrich Pinter	4	–	31	2	–	23	15	75
31	(Sweden) Mattias Nilsson	~~0~~	19	0	0	14	24	17	74
32	(Ukraine) Andriy Deryzemlya	12	24	–	–	36	–	–	72
33	(Germany) Christoph Stephan	36	21	0	15	0	0	–	72
34	(France) Vincent Jay	0	31	–	13	2	26	–	72
35	(Belarus) Rustam Valiullin	28	16	–	–	0	–	18	62
36	(Slovakia) Pavol Hurajt	11	–	5	–	0	22	24	62
37	(Ukraine) Serguei Sednev	8	1	–	40	–	–	8	57
38	(Ukraine) Vyacheslav Derkach	16	–	–	14	0	5	20	55
39	(Russia) Maxim Maksimov	0	28	22	0	–	2	–	52
40	(Switzerland) Simon Hallenbarter	–	17	0	0	12	0	23	52
41	(Russia) Andrei Makoveev	0	6	1	0	24	14	6	51
42	(France) Vincent Defrasne	17	–	28	1	1	–	–	47
43	(Austria) Tobias Eberhard	–	10	9	21	–	4	0	44
44	(Germany) Arnd Peiffer	–	–	8	9	–	0	26	43
45	(Sweden) Magnús Jónsson	0	–	16	0	26	–	–	42
46	(Norway) Ronny Hafsas	22	0	15	–	–	0	4	41
47	(United States) Jay Hakkinen	30	0	10	–	–	–	–	40
48	(Italy) Rene Laurent Vuillermoz	10	0	–	29	0	–	–	39
49	(Slovenia) Janez Maric	0	–	14	–	6	16	0	36
50	(Switzerland) Ivan Joller	–	23	–	0	11	–	0	34
51	(Belarus) Sergey Novikov	20	5	–	0	0	9	0	34
52	(Switzerland) Matthias Simmen	0	25	–	7	–	0	–	32
53	(Czech Republic) Tomáš Holubec	2	15	–	4	–	11	–	32
54	(Germany) Simon Schempp	–	–	–	–	–	–	31	31
55	(Slovenia) Klemen Bauer	–	–	–	0	30	0	0	30
56	(United States) Lowell Bailey	–	–	–	–	19	10	–	29
57	(Ukraine) Olexander Bilanenko	–	–	0	18	–	–	9	27
58	(China) Zhang Chengye	13	0	4	10	–	–	–	27
59	(Norway) Stian Eckhoff	–	26	–	–	–	–	–	26
60	(Finland) Paavo Puurunen	–	–	0	–	25	0	–	25
61	(Russia) Artem Gusev	–	–	–	–	–	–	25	25
62	(Croatia) Jakov Fak	0	–	–	–	16	3	0	19
63	(Estonia) Roland Lessing	0	–	0	5	–	13	–	18
64	(Germany) Toni Lang	7	11	0	–	–	–	–	18
65	(Norway) Frode Andresen	6	–	11	–	–	–	–	17
66	(Norway) Rune Brattsveen	–	–	–	–	–	–	16	16
67	(Czech Republic) Roman Dostál	15	0	–	–	–	–	–	15
68	(Canada) Robin Clegg	0	3	12	0	0	–	–	15
69	(Russia) Anton Shipulin	–	–	–	–	–	–	12	12
69	(Ukraine) Oleg Berezhnoy	–	12	–	–	–	–		12
69	(Norway) Hans Martin Gjedrem	–	–	–	12	–	–		12
72	(Russia) Sergey Balandin	–	–	–	–	–	–	11	11
73	(Japan) Hidenori Isa	–	4	0	6	–	–	–	10
74	(Sweden) Jörgen Brink	0	9	–	–	–	–	–	9
75	(Italy) Christian Martinelli	–	–	–	–	9	–	–	9
76	(Ukraine) Roman Pryma	0	0	–	0	8	–	–	8
77	(France) Alexis Bœuf	–	–	–	–	–	7	0	7
78	(Belarus) Alexandr Syman	0	–	–	–	5	0	–	5
79	(China) Zhang Qing	–	–	–	–	4	–	–	4
80	(France) Lois Habert	0	–	–	3	–	–	–	3
81	(Latvia) Ilmārs Bricis	–	–	0	–	3	–	–	3
81	(Slovakia) Dušan Šimočko	–	–	3	–	–	–	–	3
83	(Sweden) David Ekholm	–	0	0	0	–	0	2	2
84	(Italy) Mattia Cola	–	0	–	–	–	1	–	1
85	(United States) Jeremy Teela	1	–	–	–	–	0	0	1
86	(Germany) Christoph Knie	–	–	–	–	–	–	1	1
