= 2009–10 Biathlon World Cup – Individual Men =

The 2009–10 Biathlon World Cup – Individual Men will start at Thursday December 3, 2009 in Östersund and will finish Thursday February 18, 2009 in Vancouver at the olympic Biathlon event. Defending titlist is Michael Greis of Germany.

== Competition format ==
The 20 kilometres (12 mi) individual race is the oldest biathlon event; the distance is skied over five laps. The biathlete shoots four times at any shooting lane, in the order of prone, standing, prone, standing, totalling 20 targets. For each missed target a fixed penalty time, usually one minute, is added to the skiing time of the biathlete. Competitors' starts are staggered, normally by 30 seconds.

== 2008-09 Top 3 Standings ==
| Medal | Athlete | Points |
|---|---|---|
| Gold: | (Germany) Michael Greis | 146 |
| Silver: | (Russia) Ivan Tcherezov | 120 |
| Bronze: | (Russia) Maxim Tchoudov | 119 |

== Medal winners ==
| Event: | Gold: | Time | Silver: | Time | Bronze: | Time |
|---|---|---|---|---|---|---|
| Östersund details | Emil Hegle Svendsen; Norway | 52:43.7 (0+1+0+0) | Tim Burke; United States | 53:19.2 (0+0+0+1) | Christoph Sumann; Austria | 53:33.2 (0+0+0+1) |
| Pokljuka details | Christoph Sumann; Austria | 52:19.8 (0+0+0+1) | Simon Fourcade; France | 52:34.0 (0+0+1+0) | Alexander Os; Norway | 52:50.5 (0+0+0+1) |
| Antholz details | Serguei Sednev; Ukraine | 54:06.7 (0+0+0+0) | Daniel Mesotitsch; Austria | 54:51.6 (0+1+0+1) | Alexis Bœuf; France | 55:01.0 (0+1+0+0) |
| 2010 Winter Olympics details | Emil Hegle Svendsen; Norway | 48:22.5 (0+0+0+1) | Ole Einar Bjørndalen; Norway; Sergey Novikov; Belarus | 48:32.0 (0+1+0+1); 48:32.0 (0+0+0+0) | | |

== Standings ==
| # | Name | ÖST | POK | ANT | OLY | Total |
|---|---|---|---|---|---|---|
| 1 | Christoph Sumann (AUT) | 48 | 60 | ~~28~~ | 34 | 142 |
| 2 | Emil Hegle Svendsen (NOR) | 60 | – | – | 60 | 120 |
| 3 | Daniel Mesotitsch (AUT) | ~~11~~ | 34 | 54 | 32 | 120 |
| 4 | Serguei Sednev (UKR) | 22 | 32 | 60 | 0 | 114 |
| 5 | Pavol Hurajt (SVK) | ~~7~~ | 31 | 40 | 40 | 111 |
| 6 | Tomasz Sikora (POL) | 0 | 38 | 27 | 36 | 101 |
| 7 | Michal Šlesingr (CZE) | ~~11~~ | 43 | 32 | 24 | 99 |
| 8 | Martin Fourcade (FRA) | 36 | – | 34 | 27 | 97 |
| 9 | Tim Burke (USA) | 54 | 27 | 12 | 0 | 93 |
| 10 | Alexander Os (NOR) | 29 | 48 | – | 13 | 90 |
| 11 | Michael Greis (GER) | 32 | 20 | – | 31 | 83 |
| 12 | Simon Fourcade (FRA) | 25 | 54 | – | 1 | 80 |
| 13 | Evgeny Ustyugov (RUS) | 27 | 10 | – | 43 | 80 |
| 14 | Maxim Tchoudov (RUS) | 43 | – | 36 | – | 79 |
| 15 | Alexander Wolf (GER) | 30 | 21 | 24 | ~~17~~ | 75 |
| 16 | Sergey Novikov (BLR) | 20 | 0 | – | 54 | 74 |
| 17 | Vincent Jay (FRA) | 18 | 40 | 14 | 0 | 72 |
| 18 | Björn Ferry (SWE) | 38 | 29 | – | 0 | 67 |
| 18 | Simon Eder (AUT) | 0 | – | 29 | 38 | 67 |
| 20 | Jaroslav Soukup (CZE) | ~~6~~ | 11 | 43 | 11 | 65 |
| 21 | Andriy Deryzemlya (UKR) | 0 | 25 | 25 | 14 | 64 |
| 22 | Friedrich Pinter (AUT) | 43 | 18 | – | – | 61 |
| 23 | Jean-Philippe Leguellec (CAN) | 31 | 0 | 2 | 28 | 61 |
| 24 | Andreas Birnbacher (GER) | 0 | 19 | 10 | 29 | 58 |
| 25 | Ole Einar Bjørndalen (NOR) | 0 | – | – | 54 | 54 |
| 26 | Ivan Tcherezov (RUS) | 0 | 26 | – | 26 | 52 |
| 27 | Christoph Stephan (GER) | 0 | 0 | 38 | 12 | 50 |
| 28 | Alexis Bœuf (FRA) | 0 | – | 48 | – | 48 |
| 29 | Janez Maric (SLO) | 26 | 0 | 21 | 0 | 47 |
| 30 | Dominik Landertinger (AUT) | 24 | – | – | 18 | 42 |
| 31 | Olexander Bilanenko (UKR) | 23 | 0 | 0 | 19 | 42 |
| 32 | Thomas Frei (SUI) | 3 | 13 | – | 25 | 41 |
| 33 | Arnd Peiffer (GER) | 0 | 23 | 17 | – | 40 |
| 34 | Nikolay Kruglov (RUS) | 0 | 1 | 8 | 30 | 39 |
| 35 | Zhang Chengye (CHN) | 17 | 0 | – | 22 | 39 |
| 36 | Anton Shipulin (RUS) | 19 | 15 | – | 5 | 39 |
| 37 | Tobias Eberhard (AUT) | 15 | 0 | 23 | – | 38 |
| 38 | Roman Dostál (CZE) | – | 0 | 31 | 6 | 37 |
| 39 | Mattias Nilsson (SWE) | 0 | 30 | – | 7 | 37 |
| 40 | Frode Andresen (NOR) | – | 36 | – | – | 36 |
| 41 | Vincent Defrasne (FRA) | 0 | 0 | 20 | 15 | 35 |
| 42 | Lars Berger (NOR) | 34 | – | – | – | 34 |
| 43 | Peter Dokl (SLO) | 0 | 0 | 30 | 0 | 30 |
| 44 | Victor Vasilyev (RUS) | 0 | 29 | 0 | – | 28 |
| 45 | Tomáš Holubec (CZE) | 28 | 0 | 0 | – | 28 |
| 46 | Matthias Simmen (SUI) | 0 | 6 | 19 | 2 | 27 |
| 47 | Hans Martin Gjedrem (NOR) | – | 12 | 15 | – | 27 |
| 48 | Lukas Hofer (ITA) | 0 | 0 | 26 | 0 | 26 |
| 49 | Ivan Joller (SUI) | 0 | 24 | 1 | – | 25 |
| 50 | Tarjei Bø (NOR) | – | 4 | – | 20 | 24 |
| 51 | Ilmārs Bricis (LAT) | 16 | 8 | – | 0 | 24 |
| 52 | Dušan Šimočko (SVK) | 0 | – | 0 | 23 | 23 |
| 53 | Evgeny Abramenko (BLR) | 0 | 22 | – | 0 | 22 |
| 54 | Brendan Green (CAN) | 0 | 0 | 22 | – | 22 |
| 55 | Alexsandr Chervyhkov (KAZ) | 8 | 7 | 7 | 0 | 22 |
| 56 | Rene Laurent Vuillermoz (ITA) | 21 | – | 0 | 0 | 21 |
| 57 | Priit Viks (EST) | 0 | 0 | 0 | 21 | 21 |
| 58 | Krasimir Anev (BUL) | 4 | 0 | – | 16 | 20 |
| 59 | Fredrik Lindström (SWE) | 2 | 17 | – | 0 | 19 |
| 60 | Robin Clegg (CAN) | 0 | – | 18 | – | 18 |
| 61 | Oleg Berezhnoy (UKR) | 0 | 16 | – | – | 16 |
| 62 | Vladimir Chepelin (BLR) | – | – | 16 | – | 16 |
| 63 | Paavo Puurunen (FIN) | 14 | 0 | 0 | 0 | 14 |
| 64 | Hidenori Isa (JPN) | 0 | 14 | 0 | 0 | 14 |
| 65 | Lukasz Szczurek (POL) | 0 | 0 | 13 | 0 | 13 |
| 66 | Jay Hakkinen (USA) | 13 | – | 0 | 0 | 13 |
| 67 | Ondřej Moravec (CZE) | 12 | 0 | 0 | – | 12 |
| 68 | Markus Windisch (ITA) | 0 | 2 | 0 | 10 | 12 |
| 69 | Christian De Lorenzi (ITA) | 9 | 0 | 0 | 3 | 12 |
| 70 | Kauri Koiv (EST) | 0 | 0 | 11 | 0 | 11 |
| 71 | Klemen Bauer (SLO) | 0 | 0 | 0 | 9 | 9 |
| 72 | Vyacheslav Derkach (UKR) | 0 | 0 | 9 | – | 9 |
| 73 | Scott Perras (CAN) | – | 9 | – | – | 9 |
| 74 | Marek Matiaško (SVK) | 0 | 0 | 0 | 8 | 8 |
| 75 | Lois Habert (FRA) | – | – | 6 | – | 6 |
| 76 | Lowell Bailey (USA) | – | 5 | 0 | 0 | 5 |
| 77 | Jörgen Brink (SWE) | 5 | – | – | – | 5 |
| 77 | Julian Eberhard (AUT) | – | – | 5 | – | 5 |
| 79 | Timo Antila (FIN) | 1 | – | 4 | 0 | 5 |
| 80 | Magnús Jónsson (SWE) | 0 | 4 | – | – | 4 |
| 81 | Edgars Piksons (LAT) | – | – | – | 4 | 4 |
| 82 | Michael Rösch (GER) | 0 | 0 | 3 | – | 3 |
