= 2012–13 Biathlon World Cup – Pursuit Men =

The 2012–13 Biathlon World Cup – Pursuit Men will start on Sunday December 2, 2012 in Östersund and will finish Sunday March 17, 2013 in Khanty-Mansiysk. Defending title is Martin Fourcade of France.

== Competition format ==
This is a pursuit competition. The biathletes' starts are separated by their time differences from a previous race, most commonly a sprint race. The contestants ski a distance of 12.5 kilometres (7.8 mi) over five laps. On four of the laps, the contestants shoot at targets; each miss requires the contestant to ski a penalty loop of 150 metres (490 ft). There are two prone shooting bouts and two standing bouts, in that order. The contestant crossing the finish line first is the winner.

To prevent awkward and/or dangerous crowding of the skiing loops, and overcapacity at the shooting range, World Cup Pursuits are held with only the 60 top ranking biathletes after the preceding race. The biathletes shoot (on a first-come, first-served basis) at the lane corresponding to the position they arrived for all shooting bouts.

Points are awarded for each event, according to each contestant's finish. When all events are completed. the contestant with the highest number of points is declared the season winner.

== 2011-12 Top 3 Standings ==
| Medal | Athlete | Points |
|---|---|---|
| Gold: | (France) Martin Fourcade | 384 |
| Silver: | (Norway) Emil Hegle Svendsen | 348 |
| Bronze: | (Germany) Arnd Peiffer | 257 |

== Medal winners ==
| Event: | Gold: | Time | Silver: | Time | Bronze: | Time |
|---|---|---|---|---|---|---|
| Östersund details | Martin Fourcade; France | 33:03.5 (0+0+1+0) | Andreas Birnbacher; Germany | 33:04.2 (0+0+1+0) | Anton Shipulin; Russia | 33:06.8 (0+0+1+0) |
| Hochfilzen details | Jakov Fak; Slovenia | 34:14.8 (0+0+1+1) | Dmitry Malyshko; Russia | 34:15.7 (0+0+0+1) | Martin Fourcade; France | 34:23.4 (0+2+0+1) |
| Pokljuka details | Emil Hegle Svendsen; Norway | 32:49.2 (0+0+0+1) | Ondřej Moravec; Czech Republic | 32:53.0 (0+0+0+1) | Martin Fourcade; France | 33:06.6 (0+0+0+2) |
| Oberhof details | Dmitry Malyshko; Russia | 32:22.9 (0+0+0+0) | Evgeniy Garanichev; Russia | 33:05.0 (0+0+0+1) | Ondřej Moravec; Czech Republic | 33:12.8 (0+0+0+0) |
| Antholz details | Anton Shipulin; Russia | 31:24.2 (0+1+1+0) | Jakov Fak; Slovenia | 31:46.8 (0+0+1+0) | Daniel Mesotitsch; Austria | 31:50.0 (1+0+0+0) |
| Biathlon World Championships 2013 details | Emil Hegle Svendsen; Norway | 32:35.5 (0+0+0+1) | Martin Fourcade; France | 32:35.6 (0+1+1+0) | Anton Shipulin; Russia | 32:39.1 (0+0+1+0) |
| Holmenkollen details | Martin Fourcade; France | 33:48.2 (0+1+0+1) | Tarjei Bø; Norway | 34:15.9 (0+2+0+1) | Alexandr Loginov; Russia | 34:23.7 (0+2+0+1) |
| Khanty-Mansiysk details | Christoph Sumann; Austria | 34:47.9 (0+0+0+0) | Simon Fourcade; France | 35:23.6 (0+0+0+0) | Martin Fourcade; France | 35:28.3 (1+1+2+1) |
| Khanty-Mansiysk details | Christoph Sumann; Austria | 34:47.9 (0+0+0+0) | Simon Fourcade; France | 35:23.6 (0+0+0+0) | Michal Šlesingr; Czech Republic | 35:28.3 (0+0+1+2) |

== Standings ==
| # | Name | ÖST | HOC | POK | OBE | ANT | WCH | HOL | KHA | Total |
|---|---|---|---|---|---|---|---|---|---|---|
| 1 | Martin Fourcade (FRA) | 60 | 48 | 48 | 27 | 43 | 54 | 60 | 48 | 388 |
| 2 | Emil Hegle Svendsen (NOR) | 40 | 27 | 60 | 43 | 40 | 60 | — | 17 | 287 |
| 3 | Anton Shipulin (RUS) | 48 | 38 | — | 30 | 60 | 48 | — | 23 | 247 |
| 4 | Fredrik Lindström (SWE) | 16 | 43 | 40 | 29 | 29 | 36 | 36 | 11 | 240 |
| 5 | Dmitry Malyshko (RUS) | 36 | 54 | 22 | 60 | 16 | 43 | — | — | 231 |
| 6 | Dominik Landertinger (AUT) | 24 | 34 | 14 | — | 36 | 40 | 30 | 40 | 218 |
| 7 | Evgeniy Garanichev (RUS) | 32 | 28 | 43 | 54 | 38 | 13 | — | 9 | 217 |
| 8 | Evgeny Ustyugov (RUS) | 34 | 32 | 38 | 38 | 23 | 25 | — | 25 | 215 |
| 9 | Jakov Fak (SLO) | 4 | 60 | 19 | 8 | 54 | 38 | 31 | — | 214 |
| 10 | Andreas Birnbacher (GER) | 54 | 40 | 28 | — | — | 19 | 18 | 22 | 181 |
| 11 | Simon Eder (AUT) | 30 | 2 | 21 | 21 | 11 | 29 | 38 | 27 | 179 |
| 12 | Tim Burke (USA) | 26 | 18 | 36 | 11 | 27 | 9 | 26 | 26 | 179 |
| 13 | Jean-Guillaume Béatrix (FRA) | 2 | 26 | 34 | 23 | 32 | 15 | 27 | 20 | 179 |
| 14 | Ondřej Moravec (CZE) | — | 25 | 54 | 48 | 9 | 10 | 13 | 19 | 178 |
| 15 | Arnd Peiffer (GER) | 43 | 16 | — | 12 | 0 | 20 | 43 | 34 | 168 |
| 16 | Ole Einar Bjørndalen (NOR) | 22 | 36 | 23 | 26 | — | 31 | 29 | — | 167 |
| 17 | Michal Šlesingr (CZE) | 14 | 0 | 30 | 31 | 20 | — | 21 | 48 | 164 |
| 18 | Alexis Bœuf (FRA) | 38 | 30 | — | 36 | 18 | 34 | — | — | 156 |
| 19 | Lowell Bailey (USA) | 20 | 31 | 13 | 0 | 25 | 28 | 7 | 31 | 155 |
| 20 | Björn Ferry (SWE) | 27 | 23 | 25 | — | 30 | 32 | — | 16 | 153 |
| 21 | Lukas Hofer (ITA) | — | 22 | 0 | 13 | 28 | 30 | 17 | 36 | 146 |
| 22 | Carl Johan Bergman (SWE) | 23 | 21 | 29 | 5 | 6 | 7 | — | 38 | 129 |
| 23 | Simon Fourcade (FRA) | — | — | — | 24 | — | 18 | 32 | 54 | 128 |
| 24 | Daniel Mesotitsch (AUT) | 13 | — | — | — | 48 | 14 | 23 | 29 | 127 |
| 25 | Tarjei Bø (NOR) | — | — | — | 19 | — | 24 | 54 | 28 | 125 |
| 26 | Andrei Makoveev (RUS) | 17 | 29 | 0 | 20 | 31 | — | 11 | 12 | 120 |
| 27 | Aleksey Volkov (RUS) | 31 | 13 | — | 34 | — | — | 40 | 0 | 118 |
| 28 | Erik Lesser (GER) | 28 | 0 | 26 | 28 | 5 | 27 | 2 | 0 | 116 |
| 29 | Florian Graf (GER) | 19 | 12 | 8 | — | 13 | — | 25 | 32 | 109 |
| 30 | Friedrich Pinter (AUT) | 29 | 24 | 20 | — | 22 | — | 14 | — | 109 |
| 31 | Julian Eberhard (AUT) | — | 19 | 24 | 22 | 17 | — | 15 | 10 | 107 |
| 32 | Simon Schempp (GER) | 21 | 15 | 32 | 15 | 0 | 23 | — | — | 106 |
| 33 | Andriy Deryzemlya (UKR) | 3 | 5 | 17 | — | — | 11 | 34 | 24 | 94 |
| 34 | Andrejs Rastorgujevs (LAT) | 12 | 17 | 31 | — | — | — | 28 | 0 | 88 |
| 35 | Christoph Sumann (AUT) | 11 | — | 9 | — | — | — | — | 60 | 80 |
| 36 | Krasimir Anev (BUL) | 0 | 8 | 0 | 17 | — | 22 | 22 | 0 | 69 |
| 37 | Sjåstad Vetle Christiansen (NOR) | 18 | 20 | — | — | — | — | — | 30 | 68 |
| 38 | Henrik L'Abée-Lund (NOR) | 8 | 0 | 11 | 25 | — | 21 | — | — | 65 |
| 39 | Klemen Bauer (SLO) | — | 7 | 4 | 32 | 4 | 17 | 0 | — | 64 |
| 40 | Jean-Philippe Leguellec (CAN) | 25 | 10 | — | 0 | 2 | 26 | — | — | 63 |
| 41 | Benjamin Weger (SUI) | 10 | — | 0 | 40 | 1 | 6 | — | 0 | 57 |
| 42 | Serguei Sednev (UKR) | 0 | — | 7 | 16 | 34 | — | — | — | 57 |
| 43 | Serhiy Semenov (UKR) | — | 11 | 6 | 18 | 7 | 0 | — | 13 | 55 |
| 44 | Matej Kazar (SVK) | 0 | 0 | 0 | 0 | 12 | 12 | 12 | 14 | 50 |
| 45 | Lars Berger (NOR) | 15 | — | 27 | 7 | — | — | — | — | 49 |
| 46 | Alexandr Loginov (RUS) | — | — | — | — | — | — | 48 | — | 48 |
| 47 | Christian De Lorenzi (ITA) | — | 6 | 0 | — | 26 | 16 | 0 | 0 | 48 |
| 48 | Vladimir Iliev (BUL) | 0 | — | 18 | 0 | 10 | 2 | 3 | 7 | 40 |
| 49 | Johannes Thingnes Bø (NOR) | — | — | — | — | — | — | 16 | 21 | 37 |
| 50 | Christian Martinelli (ITA) | — | — | — | 10 | 24 | 0 | — | — | 34 |
| 51 | Dominik Windisch (ITA) | — | 0 | 0 | 3 | 21 | 8 | 0 | — | 32 |
| 52 | Mario Dolder (SUI) | 0 | — | 16 | 0 | 15 | — | — | — | 31 |
| 53 | Lars Helge Birkeland (NOR) | — | 4 | — | — | — | — | 24 | — | 28 |
| 54 | Zdeněk Vítek (CZE) | 6 | 14 | 0 | — | — | 0 | 8 | 0 | 28 |
| 55 | Olexander Bilanenko (UKR) | 0 | — | — | 14 | — | — | 10 | — | 24 |
| 56 | Pavol Hurajt (SVK) | — | 0 | — | — | — | 4 | — | 18 | 22 |
| 57 | Simon Desthieux (FRA) | 0 | 0 | 12 | 6 | — | — | 0 | 4 | 22 |
| 58 | Jaroslav Soukup (CZE) | — | — | — | 2 | 19 | 0 | 0 | — | 21 |
| 59 | Ivan Joller (SUI) | — | — | — | — | — | — | 20 | 0 | 20 |
| 60 | Aleksandr Pechenkin (RUS) | — | — | — | — | — | — | 19 | — | 19 |
| 61 | Jarkko Kauppinen (FIN) | — | 3 | — | — | 14 | 0 | 0 | — | 17 |
| 62 | Yan Savitskiy (KAZ) | — | — | — | 9 | 8 | 0 | — | 0 | 17 |
| 63 | Daniel Böhm (GER) | — | — | — | — | — | — | 1 | 15 | 16 |
| 64 | Johannes Kühn (GER) | — | — | 15 | 0 | 0 | — | — | — | 15 |
| 65 | Scott Perras (CAN) | 5 | 0 | 10 | — | 0 | — | 0 | — | 15 |
| 66 | Artem Pryma (UKR) | 0 | 0 | 1 | 0 | — | 5 | — | 8 | 14 |
| 67 | Tobias Arwidson (SWE) | 7 | — | 5 | — | — | — | — | 0 | 12 |
| 68 | Evgeny Abramenko (BLR) | — | 0 | 0 | 0 | — | — | 9 | — | 9 |
| 69 | Erlend Bjøntegaard (NOR) | 9 | — | — | 0 | — | — | 0 | — | 9 |
| 70 | Simon Hallenbarter (SUI) | — | 9 | — | 0 | 0 | — | — | — | 9 |
| 71 | Leif Nordgren (USA) | 0 | — | — | 0 | 3 | 0 | 0 | 6 | 9 |
| 72 | Milanko Petrović (SRB) | — | — | — | 1 | — | 0 | 6 | — | 7 |
| 73 | Tomas Kaukėnas (LTU) | 0 | — | 0 | — | — | 3 | — | 3 | 6 |
| 74 | Ivan Tcherezov (RUS) | — | — | — | — | — | — | 5 | — | 5 |
| 74 | Alexey Slepov (RUS) | — | — | — | — | — | — | — | 5 | 5 |
| 76 | Marc-André Bédard (CAN) | — | — | — | 4 | — | — | — | — | 4 |
| 76 | Maxim Tsvetkov (RUS) | — | — | — | — | — | — | 4 | — | 4 |
| 78 | Indrek Tobreluts (EST) | — | — | 3 | — | 0 | — | — | 0 | 3 |
| 79 | Miroslav Matiaško (SVK) | — | — | 2 | — | — | 0 | — | — | 2 |
| 80 | Christoph Stephan (GER) | — | — | — | — | — | — | — | — | 2 |
| 81 | Christoffer Eriksson (SWE) | 1 | 0 | 0 | — | — | — | — | — | 1 |
| 82 | Dušan Šimočko (SVK) | — | — | — | 0 | 0 | — | 0 | 1 | 1 |
| 83 | Benedikt Döll (GER) | — | 1 | — | — | — | — | — | 0 | 1 |
| 84 | Edgars Piksons (LAT) | — | — | — | — | — | 1 | — | — | 1 |
