= Biathlon at the 2010 Winter Olympics – Men's pursuit =

Men's pursuit at the XXI Olympic Winter Games
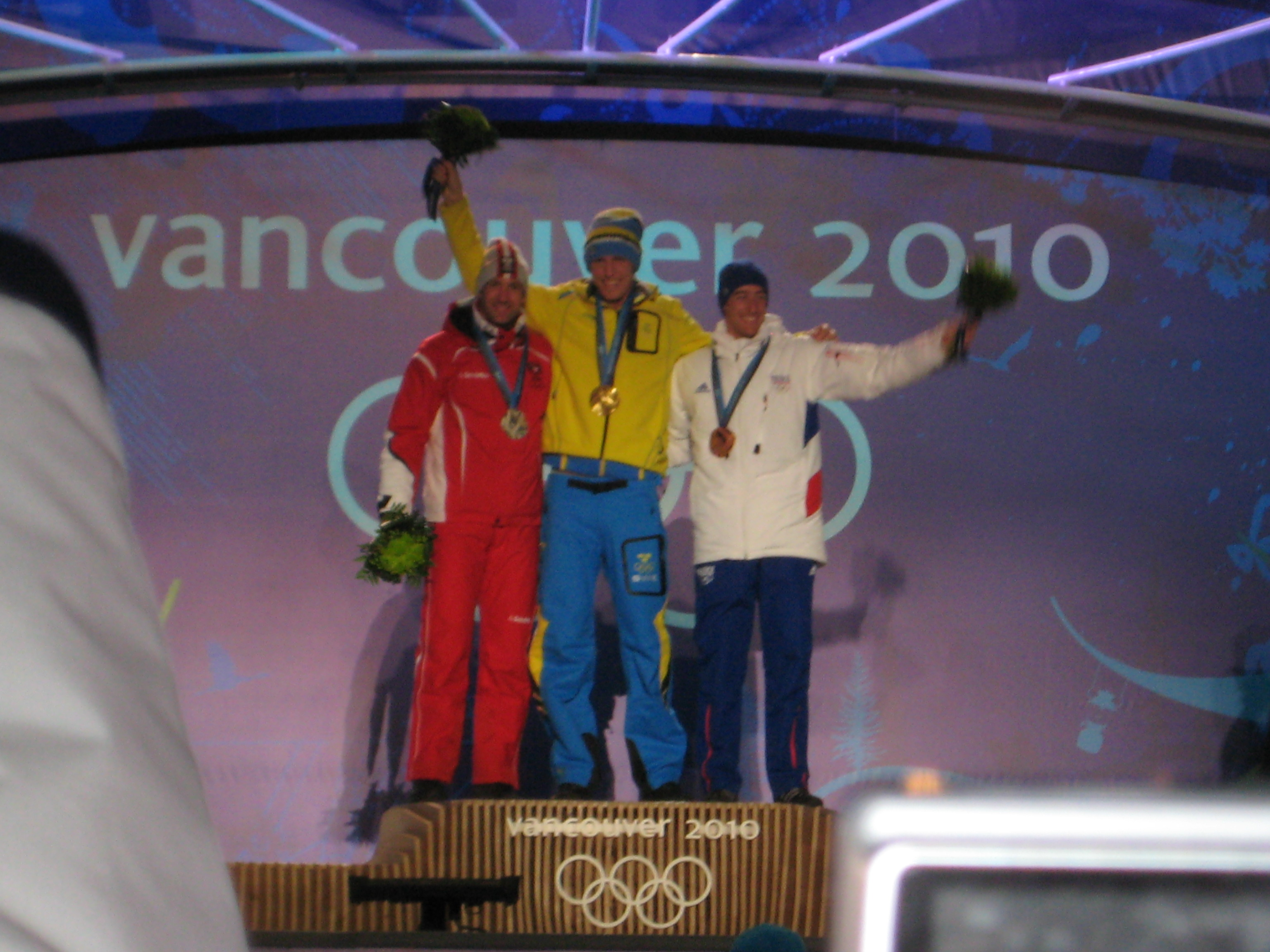
- The medalists for the event. From left: Christoph Sumann (silver), Björn Ferry (gold) and Vincent Jay (bronze)
- Venue: Whistler Olympic Park
- Date: February 16, 2010
- Competitors: 60 from 24 nations
- Winning time: 33:38.4

Medalists
1st place, gold medalist(s)		Björn Ferry	Sweden
2nd place, silver medalist(s)		Christoph Sumann	Austria
3rd place, bronze medalist(s)		Vincent Jay	France

The men's pursuit competition in biathlon at the Vancouver 2010 Olympics was held at Whistler Olympic Park in Whistler, British Columbia on February 16, 2010. It was won by Swedish athlete Björn Ferry, after both Ferry and second place finisher Christoph Sumann of Austria successfully pursued and overtook the leader at the start of the race, France's Vincent Jay.

== Competition ==
The pursuit takes place over a distance of 12.5 km (8 mi). The start of the competition was marred by irregularities in how officials released athletes at the beginning of their runs. In pursuit competitions, athlete's start times are staggered by the differences in their times in a previous sprint, in this case the 10km sprint event held on February 14. Thus, officials need to release athletes to begin the event at exact times. Athletes in both the men's and women's pursuit competitions were started earlier and later than their appropriate times, resulting in a number of complaints from coaches and athletes. Officials attempted to correct the errors by making alterations in the final times of competitors. Nonetheless, media reports cited the incident as embarrassing for the International Biathlon Union. Norbert Baier, the chief technical delegate from the IBU at the Games and the official responsible for ensuring that the rules were implemented correctly by officials, called it, "the worst day of my career."

Following the sprint, Vincent Jay of France led the field and started first. Jay would continue to set the pace throughout much of the race. Björn Ferry of Sweden, who started the race in 8th place more than a minute behind Jay, pushed hard through much of the race and finally overtook Jay in the final lap. Following Ferry, Austrian Christoph Sumann also overtook Jay and won the silver medal. Jay held on to third place, beating his closest opponent by less than three seconds at the finish line, and securing the bronze medal. Ferry's victory was the first Olympic biathlon gold medal won by a Swedish athlete in 50 years. Norwegian competitors Emil Hegle Svendsen and Ole Einar Bjørndalen, a five-time Olympic champion, were expected to do well before the race but failed to live up to those expectations. Svendsen missed four shooting targets and Bjørndalen finished nearly a minute behind Ferry.

== Confusion and starter errors ==
Observers and participants reported that several starter errors occurred during the race start. Competitors Jeremy Teela and Jean-Philippe Leguellec were started too early, before racers who were seeded higher than them. Teela stated that the early start threw-off his strategy, contributing to his missing two targets in his first two shooting range stops. Said Teela, "We have a couple more races this week. Hopefully the organizers figure this problem out and they make the races fair." Starter confusion was reportedly also present during the Women's pursuit earlier that day. U.S. coach Per Nilsson stated that he had never seen an Olympic biathlon as poorly managed as the February 16 women's race.

== Results ==
Rank	Bib	Name	Country	Start	Time	Penalties (P+P+S+S)	Deficit
1st place, gold medalist(s)	8	Björn Ferry	Sweden	1:12	33:38.4	1 (0+0+0+1)	–
2nd place, silver medalist(s)	12	Christoph Sumann	Austria	1:25	33:54.9	2 (0+0+1+1)	+16.5
3rd place, bronze medalist(s)	1	Vincent Jay	France	0:00	34:06.6	2 (0+0+1+1)	+28.2
4	11	Simon Eder	Austria	1:24	34:09.4	3 (0+0+2+1)	+31.0
5	21	Michael Greis	Germany	1:48	34:29.6	1 (0+0+0+1)	+51.2
6	10	Ivan Tcherezov	Russia	1:18	34:29.6	2 (1+0+1+0)	+51.2
7	17	Ole Einar Bjørndalen	Norway	1:41	34:29.8	2 (0+0+0+2)	+51.4
8	2	Emil Hegle Svendsen	Norway	0:12	34:30.4	4 (0+1+2+1)	+52.0
9	4	Klemen Bauer	Slovenia	0:17	34:33.8	5 (1+0+2+2)	+55.4
10	22	Serhiy Sednev	Ukraine	1:49	34:50.0	0 (0+0+0+0)	+1:11.6
11	6	Jean-Philippe Leguellec	Canada	0:50	34:51.9	2 (0+1+0+1)	+1:13.5
12	13	Thomas Frei	Switzerland	1:29	34:56.4	1 (0+1+0+0)	+1:18.0
13	23	Andreas Birnbacher	Germany	1:59	35:03.4	2 (1+0+1+0)	+1:25.0
14	34	Dominik Landertinger	Austria	2:16	35:06.7	3 (1+0+1+1)	+1:28.3
15	15	Evgeny Ustyugov	Russia	1:40	35:07.4	4 (1+1+2+0)	+1:29.0
16	7	Pavol Hurajt	Slovakia	1:07	35:12.8	3 (1+0+0+2)	+1:34.4
17	24	Halvard Hanevold	Norway	2:00	35:13.1	2 (1+1+0+0)	+1:34.7
18	29	Tomasz Sikora	Poland	2:08	35:14.3	3 (1+1+0+1)	+1:35.9
19	42	Carl Johan Bergman	Sweden	2:34	35:14.6	1 (0+1+0+0)	+1:36.2
20	30	Anton Shipulin	Russia	2:11	35:34.4	3 (0+1+2+0)	+1:56.0
21	40	Sergey Novikov	Belarus	2:30	35:35.2	2 (0+0+1+1)	+1:56.8
22	53	Vincent Defrasne	France	3:07	35:35.6	0 (0+0+0+0)	+1:57.2
23	46	Lars Berger	Norway	2:45	35:37.2	2 (0+0+0+2)	+1:58.8
24	9	Jeremy Teela	United States	1:14	35:45.4	4 (0+0+2+2)	+2:07.0
25	3	Jakov Fak	Croatia	0:14	35:45.6	4 (2+1+0+1)	+2:07.2
26	5	Andriy Deryzemlya	Ukraine	0:41	35:48.7	6 (1+0+3+2)	+2:10.3
27	39	Yan Savitskiy	Kazakhstan	2:27	35:49.6	1 (0+0+1+0)	+2:11.2
28	26	Matthias Simmen	Switzerland	2:04	35:55.0	1 (3+0+0+0)	+2:16.6
29	18	Michal Šlesingr	Czech Republic	1:43	35:58.8	3 (0+0+1+2)	+2:20.4
30	19	Christoph Stephan	Germany	1:43	36:02.3	4 (1+0+1+2)	+2:23.9
31	20	Alexandr Syman	Belarus	1:46	36:13.9	2 (0+0+1+1)	+2:35.5
32	14	Ilmārs Bricis	Latvia	1:34	36:14.9	4 (0+0+2+2)	+2:36.5
33	38	Fredrik Lindström	Sweden	2:26	36:25.5	4 (0+1+1+2)	+2:47.1
34	35	Martin Fourcade	France	2:18	36:28.4	5 (1+0+2+2)	+2:50.0
35	32	Zhang Chengye	China	2:12	36:28.7	5 (0+2+1+2)	+2:50.3
36	36	Lowell Bailey	United States	2:19	36:34.0	3 (0+2+1+0)	+2:55.6
37	37	Arnd Peiffer	Germany	2:21	36:44.9	4 (0+0+1+3)	+3:06.5
38	28	Zdeněk Vítek	Czech Republic	2:06	36:45.1	5 (1+1+1+2)	+3:06.7
39	33	Serhiy Semenov	Ukraine	2:13	36:55.7	4 (3+1+0+0)	+3:17.3
40	49	Evgeny Abramenko	Belarus	2:50	36:56.0	1 (0+0+1+0)	+3:17.6
41	45	Daniel Mesotitsch	Austria	2:38	36:56.0	4 (0+0+3+1)	+3:17.6
42	43	Rustam Valiullin	Belarus	2:36	37:05.5	5 (1+0+2+2)	+3:27.1
43	16	Simon Hallenbarter	Switzerland	1:41	37:07.9	6 (1+2+1+2)	+3:29.5
44	59	Michail Kletcherov	Bulgaria	3:15	37:08.1	0 (0+0+0+0)	+3:29.7
45	25	Krasimir Anev	Bulgaria	2:01	37:24.2	3 (2+0+0+1)	+3:45.8
46	47	Tim Burke	United States	2:47	37:26.8	5 (0+2+1+2)	+3:48.4
47	27	Janez Marič	Slovenia	2:05	37:28.4	5 (0+1+3+1)	+3:50.0
48	31	Indrek Tobreluts	Estonia	2:11	37:29.0	5 (2+0+2+1)	+3:50.6
49	51	Alexsandr Chervyhkov	Kazakhstan	3:02	37:30.5	3 (1+0+1+1)	+3:52.1
50	48	Kauri Koiv	Estonia	2:48	37:45.5	4 (0+1+2+1)	+4:07.1
51	52	Jaroslav Soukup	Czech Republic	3:03	38:04.9	4 (1+1+1+1)	+4:26.5
52	41	Timo Antila	Finland	2:30	38:22.1	6 (0+1+2+3)	+4:43.7
53	44	Markus Windisch	Italy	2:37	39:50.8	6 (0+2+3+1)	+6:12.4
54	56	Lukas Hofer	Italy	3:11	39:50.9	5 (2+0+2+1)	+6:12.5
55	60	Mattia Cola	Italy	3:17	39:50.9	4 (0+0+0+4)	+6:12.5
56	55	Lee-Steve Jackson	Great Britain	3:10	39:54.7	4 (0+1+3+0)	+6:16.3
57	54	Jay Hakkinen	United States	3:10	40:33.2	6 (1+2+3+0)	+6:54.8
58	50	Andrejs Rastorgujevs	Latvia	2:58	41:35.9	9 (2+2+3+2)	+7:57.5
59	57	Vasja Rupnik	Slovenia	3:13	41:59.2	11 (1+2+4+4)	+8:20.8
	58	Peter Dokl	Slovenia	3:13	LAP	5 (0+3+2+ )	

== See also ==
- Biathlon at the 2010 Winter Paralympics – Men's pursuit
