= Biathlon at the 2010 Winter Olympics – Men's relay =

Men's relay at the XXI Olympic Winter Games
- Pictogram for biathlon
- Venue: Whistler Olympic Park
- Date: February 26, 2010
- Competitors: 19 teams from 19 nations
- Winning time: 1:21:38.1

Medalists
1st place, gold medalist(s)		Halvard Hanevold; Tarjei Bø; Emil Hegle Svendsen; Ole Einar Bjørndalen	Norway
2nd place, silver medalist(s)		Simon Eder; Daniel Mesotitsch; Dominik Landertinger; Christoph Sumann	Austria
3rd place, bronze medalist(s)		Fredrik Lindström; Carl Johan Bergman; Mattias Nilsson; Björn Ferry	Sweden

The men's relay competition of the Vancouver 2010 Olympics was held at Whistler Olympic Park in Whistler, British Columbia on February 26, 2010. The race consisted of four laps of cross-country skiing, each lap a total of 7.5 km. Every 2.5 km there would be a shooting zone, the first one is prone and the second one is standing. Any misses in the shooting zones count as penalties which must be completed by going around a penalty loop right after the second shooting zone. There were four racers per team, each completing one lap. As all the teams started together, the team that crossed the finish line first would win.

On October 26, 2020, it was announced that Evgeny Ustyugov of Russia was charged by the Biathlon Integrity Unit for haemoglobin doping and could lose his 2010 results. The decision was confirmed in 2024, resulting in the disqualification of the bronze medalist Russian team in this event. In May 2025 the final appeals of the decision were exhausted, and in September the International Olympic Committee formally reallocated Ustyugov's medals — a gold and a bronze from 2010 and a relay gold from 2014 — to other athletes.

== Results ==
The race started at 11:30.

Rank	Bib	Country	Time	Penalties (P+S)	Deficit
1st place, gold medalist(s)	1	Norway Halvard Hanevold; Tarjei Bø; Emil Hegle Svendsen; Ole Einar Bjørndalen	1:21:38.1; 20:15.6; 20:26.8; 20:31.3; 20:24.4	0+5 0+2; 0+1 0+0; 0+1 0+1; 0+1 0+1; 0+2 0+0	0.0
2nd place, silver medalist(s)	2	Austria Simon Eder; Daniel Mesotitsch; Dominik Landertinger; Christoph Sumann	1:22:16.7; 20:10.0; 20:38.0; 20:25.9; 21:02.8	1+6 0+2; 0+0 0+1; 0+2 0+1; 0+1 0+0; 1+3 0+0	+38.6
3rd place, bronze medalist(s)	7	Sweden Fredrik Lindström; Carl Johan Bergman; Mattias Nilsson; Björn Ferry	1:23:02.0; 20:11.3; 20:37.9; 21:32.0; 20:40.8	0+3 1+7; 0+1 0+0; 0+1 0+3; 0+0 1+3; 0+1 0+1	+1:23.9
4	5	Germany Simon Schempp; Andreas Birnbacher; Arnd Peiffer; Michael Greis	1:23:16.0; 20:10.4; 21:53.7; 20:56.9; 20:15.0	0+0 2+7; 0+0 0+1; 0+0 2+3; 0+0 0+3; 0+0 0+0	+1:37.9
5	4	France Vincent Jay; Vincent Defrasne; Simon Fourcade; Martin Fourcade	1:23:16.2; 20:13.7; 21:25.6; 21:08.2; 20:28.7	0+3 1+6; 0+2 0+1; 0+1 1+3; 0+0 0+0; 0+0 0+2	+1:38.1
6	14	Czech Republic Jaroslav Soukup; Zdeněk Vítek; Roman Dostál; Michal Šlesingr	1:23:55.2; 20:13.5; 20:36.8; 21:45.7; 21:19.2	0+3 0+6; 0+0 0+1; 0+1 0+1; 0+2 0+2; 0+0 0+2	+2:17.1
7	9	Ukraine Olexander Bilanenko; Andriy Deryzemlya; Vyacheslav Derkach; Serhiy Sednev	1:24:25.1; 20:38.7; 20:44.3; 21:47.3; 21:14.8	0+1 0+3; 0+0 0+1; 0+1 0+1; 0+0 0+0; 0+0 0+1	+2:47.0
8	6	Switzerland Thomas Frei; Matthias Simmen; Benjamin Weger; Simon Hallenbarter	1:24:36.8; 20:47.6; 21:17.1; 21:26.1; 21:06.0	0+2 0+7; 0+0 0+1; 0+2 0+3; 0+0 0+2; 0+0 0+1	+2:58.7
9	18	Canada Robin Clegg; Marc-André Bédard; Brendan Green; Jean-Philippe Le Guellec	1:24:50.7; 20:16.4; 21:11.6; 22:12.0; 21:10.7	0+3 0+4; 0+0 0+1; 0+1 0+1; 0+2 0+1; 0+0 0+1	+3:12.6
10	8	Belarus Evgeny Abramenko; Alexandr Syman; Rustam Valiullin; Sergey Novikov	1:25:47.4; 21:59.3; 21:05.0; 21:36.4; 21:06.7	0+3 1+5; 0+1 0+1; 0+1 0+1; 0+0 1+3; 0+1 0+0	+4:09.3
11	17	Italy Christian de Lorenzi; Markus Windisch; Lukas Hofer; Mattia Cola	1:26:27.5; 20:16.7; 21:39.6; 21:44.1; 22:47.1	0+3 1+8; 0+1 0+2; 0+0 1+3; 0+0 0+2; 0+2 0+1	+4:49.4
12	10	United States Lowell Bailey; Jay Hakkinen; Tim Burke; Jeremy Teela	1:27:58.3; 20:51.8; 21:47.0; 22:01.7; 23:17.8	0+2 4+10; 0+0 0+1; 0+0 1+3; 0+0 2+3; 0+2 1+3	+6:20.2
13	12	Estonia Priit Viks; Kauri Kõiv; Indrek Tobreluts; Roland Lessing	1:28:16.5; 21:07.1; 22:39.6; 21:54.3; 22:35.5	3+7 0+3; 0+0 0+3; 1+3 0+0; 0+1 0+0; 2+3 0+0	+6:38.4
14	19	Slovakia Miroslav Matiaško; Marek Matiaško; Dušan Šimočko; Pavol Hurajt	1:28:54.1; 21:18.3; 22:09.6; 23:56.3; 21:29.9	1+4 1+8; 0+0 0+1; 0+0 0+2; 1+3 1+3; 0+1 0+2	+7:16.0
15	15	Bulgaria Michail Kletcherov; Vladimir Iliev; Miroslav Kenanov; Krasimir Anev	1:29:39.7; 20:48.4; 22:36.4; 23:28.9; 22:46.0	0+3 0+6; 0+1 0+1; 0+2 0+1; 0+0 0+1; 0+0 0+3	+8:01.6
16	13	Slovenia Peter Dokl; Klemen Bauer; Vasja Rupnik; Janez Marič	1:29:52.4; 23:09.1; 22:24.3; 22:10.2; 22:08.8	0+6 3+10; 0+2 1+3; 0+0 2+3; 0+3 0+2; 0+1 0+2	+8:14.3
17	16	Kazakhstan Alexandr Chervyakov; Yan Savitskiy; Dias Keneshev; Alexandr Trifonov	1:30:31.1; 21:08.9; 22:23.1; 24:10.2; 22:48.9	2+6 2+7; 0+1 0+3; 2+3 0+1; 0+1 2+3; 0+1 0+0	+8:53.0
18	11	Latvia Edgars Piksons; Ilmārs Bricis; Andrejs Rastorgujevs; Kristaps Lībietis	1:35:15.5; 26:11.5; 21:47.2; 23:31.6; 23:45.2	5+8 2+8; 3+3 2+3; 0+1 0+2; 2+3 0+0; 0+1 0+3	+13:37.4
DSQ	DSQ	Russia ~~Ivan Tcherezov~~; ~~Anton Shipulin~~; ~~Maxim Tchoudov~~; ~~Evgeny Ustyugov~~	~~1:22:16.9~~; 20:07.5; 21:05.0; 20:23.2; ~~20:41.2~~	~~0+0 0+4~~; 0+0 0+1; 0+0 0+0; 0+0 0+0; ~~0+0 0+3~~	~~+38.8~~
