= Heidi Andersson =

Swedish armwrestler

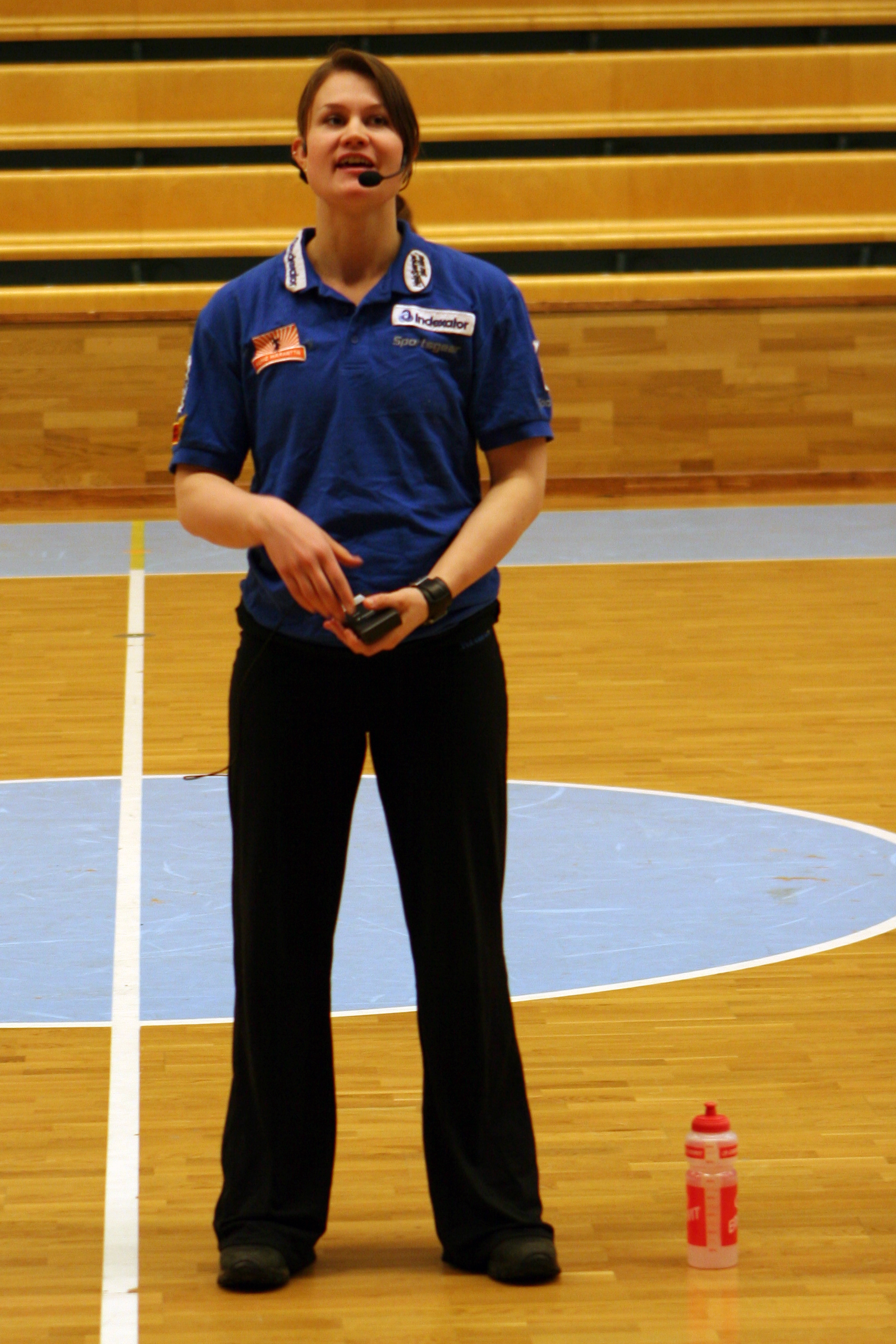
- Heidi Andersson

Personal information
- Nationality: Swedish
- Born: 27 February 1981 Ensamheten, Sweden

Sport
- Sport: armwrestling

Heidi Andersson (born 27 February 1981) is a Swedish armwrestler. She has won the World Championships in armwrestling eleven times. She was born in the locality of Ensamheten, Storuman Municipality, and is married to Swedish biathlete Björn Ferry, with whom she has a son, Dante Andersson Ferry, born 19 July 2011.

== Championships won ==
- World Championship 1999, Tokyo, Japan, 60 kg
- World Championship 2000, Rovaniemi, Finland, 60 kg
- World Championship 2002, Springfield, Illinois, United States, 60 kg
- World Championship 2003, Ottawa, Canada, 65 kg
- World Championship 2004, Durban, South Africa, 65 kg
- World Championship 2008, Kelowna, Canada, 60 kg
- World Championship 2009, Rosolina Di Mare, Italy, 65 kg
- World Championship 2010, Mesquite, Nevada, United States, 70 kg
- World Championship 2011, Almaty, Kazakhstan, 70 kg
- World Championship 2014, Vilnius, Lithuania, 65 kg left arm
- World Championship 2014, Vilnius, Lithuania, 65 kg right arm
- European Championship 1999, Rochefort, Belgium, 55 kg
- European Championship 2008, Sarpsborg, Norway, 60 kg
- European Championship 2014, Baku, Azerbaijan, 65 kg
