= Jeremy Teela =

American biathlete

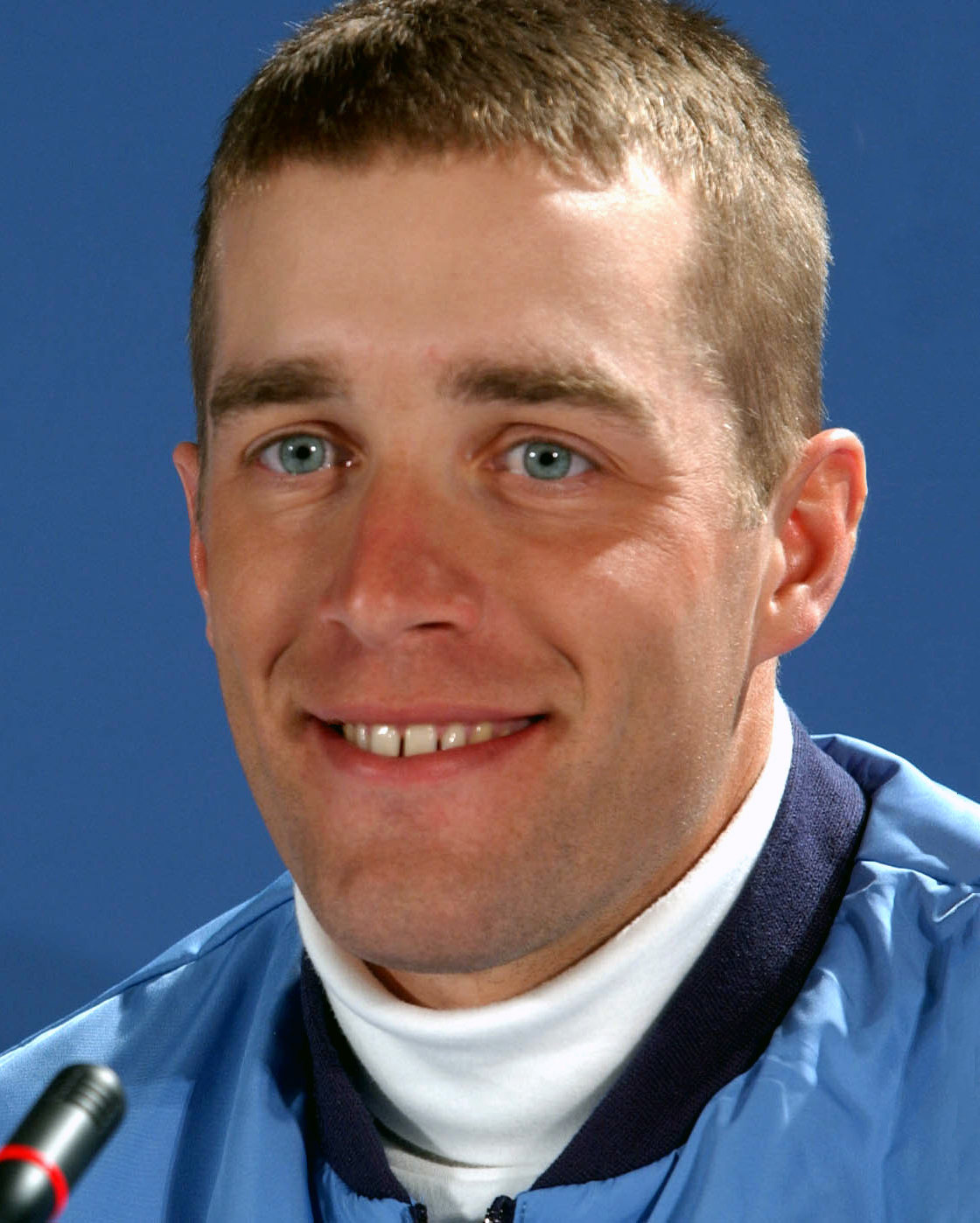
- Teela in February 2002.

Personal information
- Full name: Jeremy Scott Teela
- Born: 27 October 1976 (age 49) Tonasket, Washington, U.S.
- Height: 1.80 m (5 ft 11 in)

Sport

Professional information
- Sport: Biathlon
- Club: U.S. Army WCAP
- World Cup debut: 11 January 1997
- Retired: 18 April 2014

Olympic Games
- Teams: 3 (2002, 2006, 2010)
- Medals: 0

World Championships
- Teams: 10 (1997, 1999, 2000, 2001, 2003, 2004, 2005, 2007, 2008, 2009)
- Medals: 0

World Cup
- Seasons: 16 (1996/97–2010/11, 2013/14)
- Individual victories: 0
- All victories: 0
- Individual podiums: 1
- All podiums: 1

Jeremy Scott Teela (born 27 October 1976) is a former American biathlete and a Staff Sergeant in the United States Army.

== Life and career ==
Teela is a three-time Olympian, having competed in the 2002, 2006, and 2010 Winter Olympics.

Teela retired from the sport at the end of the 2013–14 season.

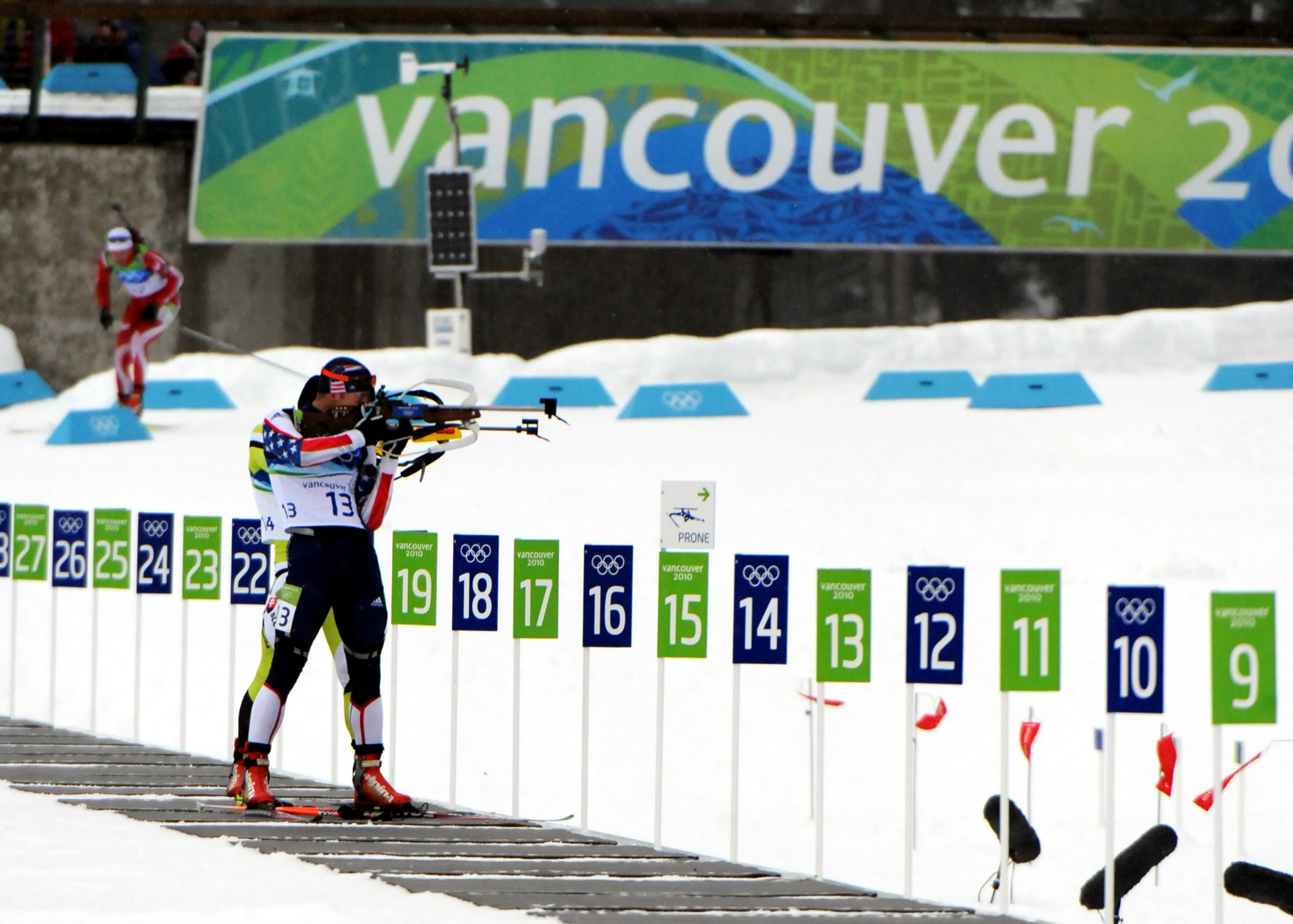
Teela shoots from the standing position in the men's sprint at the 2010 Winter Olympics.

At the 2002 Winter Olympics in Salt Lake City, at the biathlon course in Soldier Hollow, he finished 14th. He participated in the men's 4 × 7.5 km relay team at the 2006 Winter Olympics in Turin, which finishing 9th.

At the 2010 Winter Olympics in Vancouver, Teela finished 9th in the 10 km sprint, the best individual American result to date in biathlon; 13th as part of the 4 × 7.5 km relay team; and 24th in the 12.5 km pursuit.

Teela's best World Cup result was a 3rd place in an individual distance race at Whistler Mountain on March 11, 2009. He did not compete in the World Cup racing during the 2011–12 season and 2012–13 season.

== Biathlon results ==
All results are sourced from the International Biathlon Union.

=== Olympic Games ===
Event	Individual	Sprint	Pursuit	Mass start	Relay
(United States) 2002 Salt Lake City	14th	20th	23rd	—N/a	15th
(Italy) 2006 Turin	51st	60th	—	—	9th
(Canada) 2010 Vancouver	—	9th	24th	29th	13th

*Mass start was added as an event in 2006.

=== World Championships ===
Event	Individual	Sprint	Pursuit	Mass start	Team	Relay	Mixed relay
(Slovakia) 1997 Brezno-Osrblie	—	—	—	—N/a	14th	20th	—N/a
(Finland) 1999 Kontiolahti	75th	39th	58th	—	—N/a	18th	—N/a
(Norway) 2000 Oslo Holmenkollen	86th	62nd	—	—	—N/a	16th	—N/a
(Slovenia) 2001 Pokljuka	55th	9th	20th	—	—N/a	—	—N/a
(Russia) 2003 Khanty-Mansiysk	76th	10th	17th	28th	—N/a	17th	—N/a
(Germany) 2004 Oberhof	75th	60th	DNS	—	—N/a	18th	—N/a
(Austria) 2005 Hochfilzen	54th	22nd	36th	—	—N/a	—	DNS
(Italy) 2007 Antholz-Anterselva	44th	46th	46th	—	—N/a	9th	DNS
(Sweden) 2008 Östersund	47th	73rd	—	—	—N/a	15th	16th
(South Korea) 2009 Pyeongchang	44th	69th	—	—	—N/a	21st	18th

*During Olympic seasons competitions are only held for those events not included in the Olympic program.
**Team was removed as an event in 1998, and mass start was added in 1999 with the mixed relay being added in 2005.
