= Michail Kletcherov =

Bulgarian biathlete (born 1982)

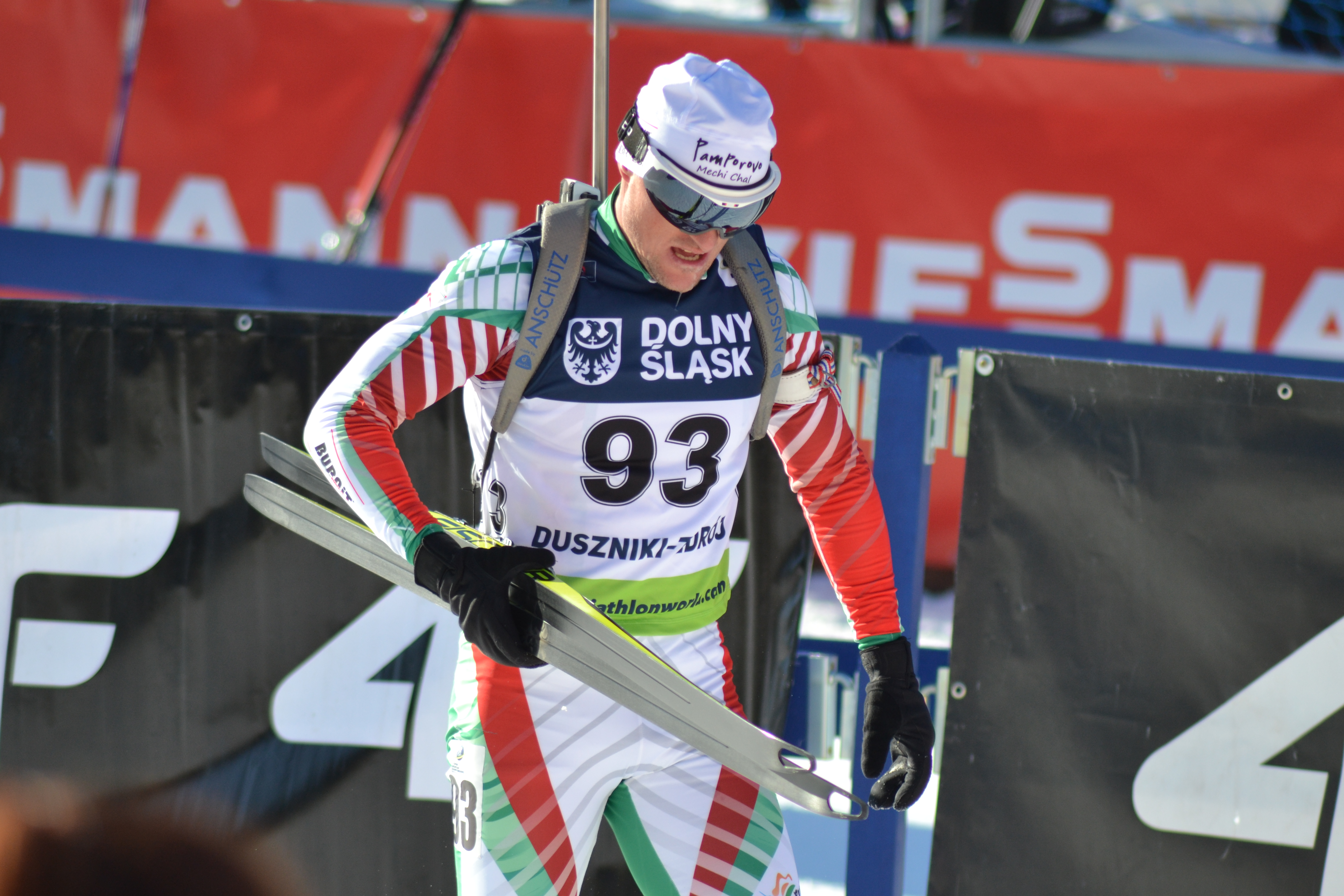

Personal information
- Born: 3 December 1982 (age 43) Bansko, Bulgaria
- Height: 161 cm (5 ft 3 in)

Sport
- Sport: Skiing
- Updated on 28 February 2013

Michail Kletcherov (Bulgarian: Михаип Клечеров; born 3 December, 1982, in Bansko) is a Bulgarian biathlete.

He competed in the 2010 Winter Olympics for Bulgaria. His best finish was 16th, as a member of the Bulgarian relay team. His best individual performance was 44th, in the pursuit.

As of February 2013, at the Biathlon World Championships, he was placed 9th, in the 2013 mixed relay event. His best individual performance in a World Championships is 27th, in the 2012 individual.

As of February 2013, his best Biathlon World Cup finish is 11th, achieved in two men's relay events and one mixed relay. His best individual finish is 13th, in the mass start at Antholz in 2011/12. His best overall finish in the Biathlon World Cup is 47th, in 2011/12.
