= Björn Ferry =

Swedish biathlete (born 1978)

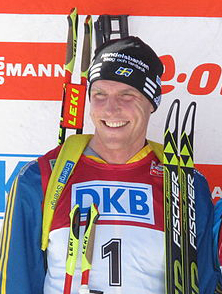
- Björn Ferry during World Cup competitions in Pokljuka, Slovenia in March 2014.

Personal information
- Full name: Björn Lars Johannes Erik Ferry
- Born: 1 August 1978 (age 48) Storuman, Sweden
- Height: 1.94 m (6 ft 4 in)
- Website: heidiandersson.com/bjorn-ferry/

Sport

Professional information
- Sport: Biathlon
- World Cup debut: 6 December 2001
- Retired: 23 March 2014

Olympic Games
- Teams: 4 (2002, 2006, 2010, 2014)
- Medals: 1 (1 gold)

World Championships
- Teams: 11 (2002, 2003, 2004, 2005, 2007, 2008, 2009, 2010, 2011, 2012, 2013)
- Medals: 4 (1 gold)

World Cup
- Seasons: 13 (2001/02–2013/14)
- Individual victories: 7
- All victories: 9
- Individual podiums: 22
- All podiums: 31
Medal record
Men's biathlon
Representing Sweden
International biathlon competitions
Event	1st	2nd	3rd
Olympic Games	1	0	0
World Championships	1	1	2
Total	2	1	2
Olympic Games
Gold medal – first place	2010 Vancouver	12.5 km pursuit
Bronze medal – third place	2010 Vancouver	4 × 7.5 km relay
World Championships
Gold medal – first place	2007 Antholz-Anterselva	Mixed relay
Silver medal – second place	2012 Rupholding	15 km mass start
Bronze medal – third place	2010 Khanty-Mansiysk	Mixed relay
Bronze medal – third place	2011 Khanty-Mansiysk	4 × 7.5 km relay

Björn Ferry (born 1 August 1978) is a Swedish former biathlete and Olympic champion. He began competing internationally in World Cup competitions in 2001, but did not win his first international race until the 2007–2008 season. In 2007, he won gold in the mixed relay event at the Biathlon World Championships. In 2010, at his third Winter Olympics appearance, he won the gold medal in the pursuit event. He started the event in 8th place as determined by the previous sprint event, but managed to overtake the race leader on the final lap.

== Career ==
Ferry debuted in the World Cup in Hochfilzen in 2001, and earned his first World Cup points after only skiing three races. He finished his first season ranked 36th in World Cup standings. In World Cup competition, he slowly improved his ranking, and by the 2006–2007 season, was ranked in the top ten worldwide. His first Olympic appearance, at the 2002 Winter Olympics in Salt Lake City, Utah, was disappointing, but four years later at the 2006 Games in Turin, Italy he was a member of a Swedish relay team that placed fourth, just off the medal stand.

Ferry has seen some of his strongest efforts and best finishes in Italy, even beyond the 2006 success. His first two World Cup victories both came in the pursuit in Antholz-Anterselva, in the 2007–2008 and 2008–2009 seasons. In 2007, he won a gold medal in the mixed relay in the 2007 World Championships alongside Helena Jonsson, Anna Carin Olofsson, and Carl Johan Bergman. Although his 2009–2010 season was lacklustre, and Ferry saw his ranking drop from 9th to 16th place in the World Cup, Ferry was again selected for the Swedish team for the 2010 Olympic Games in Vancouver, British Columbia, Canada. In the pursuit event held on 16 February, Ferry finished in first place, winning the gold medal after catching and passing the race leader on the final lap of the race. He beat second-place finisher Christoph Sumann of Austria by only 16.5 seconds. The victory marked the first Olympic biathlon gold for a Swedish male athlete in half a century.

Ferry practices with the Storuman IK club. His personal coach was German Wolfgang Pichler until Pichler left his role as coach of the Swedish biathlon team in 2010. He subsequently described the atmosphere in the team under Pichler as being like a cult, although he praised Pichler for the energy he brought to the role.

In March 2014, Ferry confirmed that he would be retiring from the sport at the end of the 2013–14 season.

=== Opposition to doping ===
Ferry has been outspoken in his opposition to the use of banned substances by athletes who participate in international competition, a practice known as doping. In 2009, he was quoted referring to Russian athletes who had used such substances as 'idiots' and received a number of death threats. During the 2010 winter Olympics, he was quoted saying he would not mind if athletes who use banned substances would get the death penalty or, "at least lots of kicks in the balls." Further comments referred to dopers as people with low moral standards and suggested that the problem of use of banned substances in sport would not go away until more severe penalties were imposed.

== Personal life ==
Ferry is married to an arm wrestler Heidi Andersson, who has won multiple world championships in arm wrestling. In November 2017, he announced he'd given up flying because of the environment.

In March and April 2018, SVT aired the programme series Storuman Forever, depicting the Heidi Andersson and Björn Ferry couple's climate engagement.

Flygskam, translating as ‘Flight Shame’, or ‘Flight Conscience’, a social pressure not to fly because of the rising greenhouse gas emissions of the airline industry, was originally championed by Björn Ferry but has since gained considerable momentum after Greta Thunberg’s refusal to fly on environmental grounds. Sweden has reported a 4% drop in domestic travel for 2019 and a 9% increase in rail use. The BBC claims that the movement could halve the growth of global air travel, but Airbus and Boeing claim that it will continue to grow at around 4% until 2035.

== Biathlon results ==
All results are sourced from the International Biathlon Union.

=== Olympic Games ===
1 medal (1 gold)

Event	Individual	Sprint	Pursuit	Mass start	Relay	Mixed relay
(United States) 2002 Salt Lake City	38th	17th	24th	—N/a	14th	—N/a
(Italy) 2006 Turin	28th	13th	25th	18th	4th	—N/a
(Canada) 2010 Vancouver	42nd	8th	Gold	12th	Bronze	—N/a
(Russia) 2014 Sochi	12th	25th	30th	12th	10th	—

*Mass start was added as an event in 2006, with the mixed relay being added in 2014.

=== World Championships ===
4 medals (1 gold, 1 silver, 2 bronze)

Event	Individual	Sprint	Pursuit	Mass start	Relay	Mixed relay
(Norway) 2002 Oslo Holmenkollen	—N/a	—N/a	—N/a	28th	—N/a	—N/a
(Russia) 2003 Khanty-Mansiysk	32nd	43rd	36th	—	7th	—N/a
(Germany) 2004 Oberhof	31st	DNF	—	—	6th	—N/a
(Austria) 2005 Hochfilzen	52nd	17th	16th	18th	7th	13th
(Italy) 2007 Antholz-Anterselva	14th	4th	22nd	15th	7th	Gold
(Sweden) 2008 Östersund	27th	15th	18th	9th	6th	4th
(South Korea) 2009 Pyeongchang	—	40th	31st	—	9th	—
(Russia) 2010 Khanty-Mansiysk	—N/a	—N/a	—N/a	—N/a	—N/a	Bronze
(Russia) 2011 Khanty-Mansiysk	5th	23rd	10th	27th	Bronze	4th
(Germany) 2012 Ruhpolding	48th	7th	11th	Silver	16th	4th
(Czech Republic) 2013 Nové Město	5th	13th	9th	8th	11th	14th

*During Olympic seasons, competitions are only held for those events not included in the Olympic program.
**The mixed relay was added as an event in 2005.

=== Individual victories ===
7 victories (2 Sp, 4 Pu, 1 MS)

Season	Date	Location	Discipline	Level
2007–08; 1 victory (1 Pu)	19 January 2008	(Italy) Antholz-Anterselva	12.5 km pursuit	Biathlon World Cup
2008–09; 1 victory (1 Pu)	24 January 2009	(Italy) Antholz-Anterselva	12.5 km pursuit	Biathlon World Cup
2009–10; 1 victory (1 Pu)	16 February 2010	(Canada) Vancouver	12.5 km pursuit	Winter Olympic Games
2010–11; 2 victories (1 Sp, 1 Pu)	18 December 2010	(Slovenia) Pokljuka	10 km sprint	Biathlon World Cup
2010–11; 2 victories (1 Sp, 1 Pu)	16 January 2011	(Germany) Ruhpolding	12.5 km pursuit	Biathlon World Cup
2013–14; 2 victories (1 Sp, 1 MS)	6 March 2014	(Slovenia) Pokljuka	10 km sprint	Biathlon World Cup
2013–14; 2 victories (1 Sp, 1 MS)	9 March 2014	(Slovenia) Pokljuka	15 km mass start	Biathlon World Cup

*Results are from UIPMB and IBU races which include the Biathlon World Cup, Biathlon World Championships and the Winter Olympic Games.

== Cross-country skiing results ==
Björn Ferry
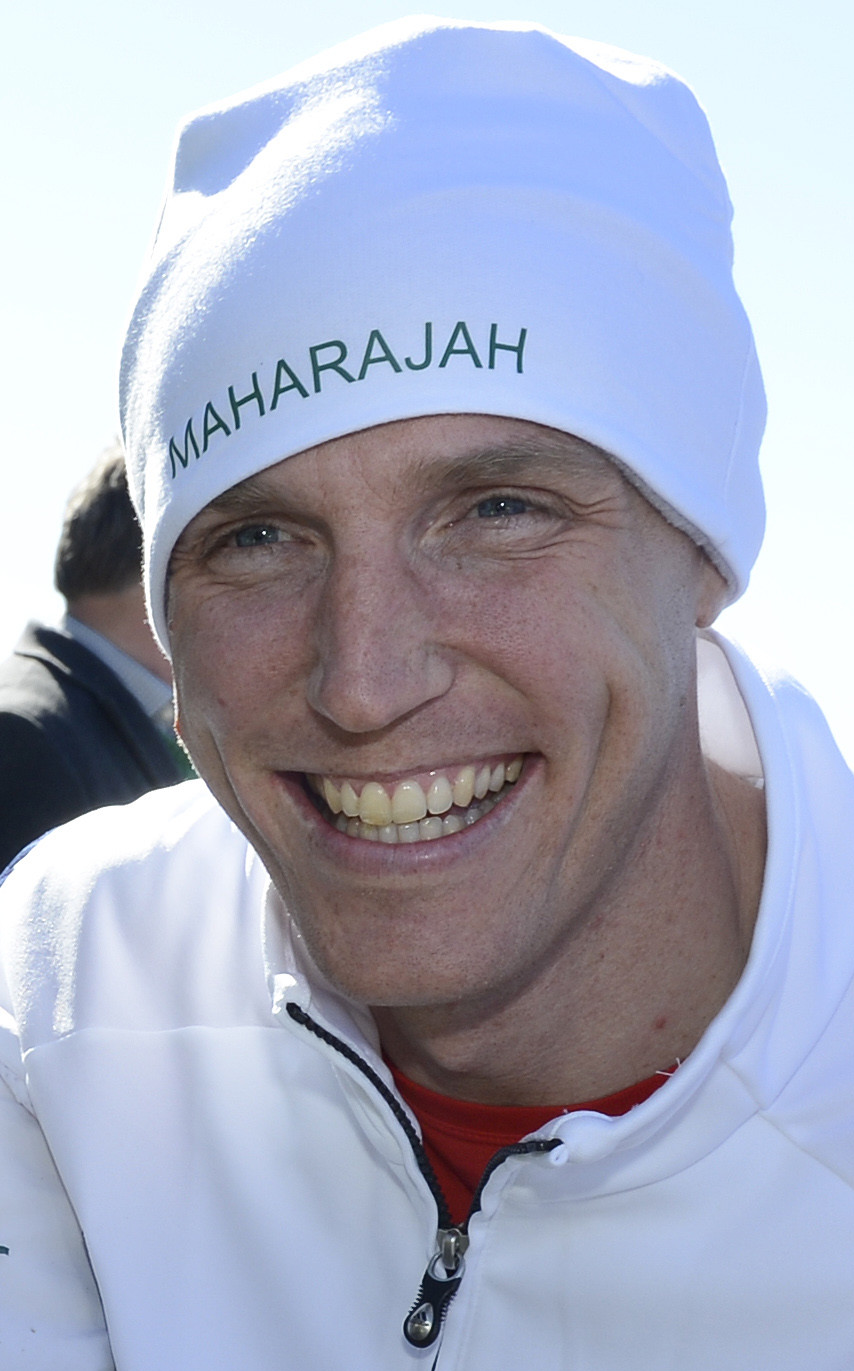

Sport
- Sport: Skiing

World Cup career
- Seasons: 2000–2001
- Indiv. starts: 5
- Indiv. podiums: 0
- Team starts: 3
- Team podiums: 0
- Overall titles: 0
- Discipline titles: 0

All results are sourced from the International Ski Federation (FIS).

=== World Cup ===
==== Season standings ====
Season	Age	Season standings			
Season	Age	Overall	Long Distance	Middle Distance	Sprint
2000	22	NC	NC	NC	—
2001	23	NC	—N/a	—N/a	—
