= Mattia Cola =

Italian biathlete (born 1984)

Personal information
- Born: 3 May 1984 (age 42) Sondalo, Italy

Sport
- Sport: Skiing
- Updated on 28 February 2013

Mattia Cola (born in Sondalo on 3 May 1984) is an Italian biathlete.

Cola competed in the 2010 Winter Olympics for Italy. His best performance was 12th, as part of the Italian relay team. His best individual performance was 55th, in the pursuit. He also finished 60th in the sprint.

As of February 2013, his best performance at the Biathlon World Championships, is 11th, as part of the 2008 Italian men's relay team. His best individual performance is 78th, in the 2008 individual.

As of February 2013, his best Biathlon World Cup finish is 5th, as part of the Italian men's relay team in two races during the 2007/08 season. His best individual finish is 26th, in the pursuit at Antholz in 2009/10. His best overall finish in the Biathlon World Cup is 90th, in 2007/08.
