= Biathlon World Championships 2009 =

Sports competition in Pyeongchang, South Korea

- Host city: Pyeongchang
- Country: South Korea
- Events: 11
- Opening: 13 February 2009
- Closing: 22 February 2009
- Main venue: Alpensia Biathlon Centre

The 43rd Biathlon World Championships were held in Pyeongchang, South Korea from February 13 to February 22, 2009. It was the first time that the Biathlon World Championships were held in Asia (outside Asian Russia).

There were a total of 11 competitions: sprint, pursuit, individual, mass start, and relay races for men and women, and the relatively new mixed relay. All the events during these championships also counted for the 2008–09 Biathlon World Cup season.

== Championship highlights ==
Before the championships even started there was controversy with three Russian biathletes being sent home for having failed drugs tests during a previous round of the World Cup in Ostersund, Sweden. Then the first day's competition was only made possible after the efforts of over 500 volunteers, working overnight managed to re-lay the competition tracks with man-made snow after all the natural snow had disappeared after unusual weather conditions melted it all away.

The events themselves started with a victory for Kati Wilhelm in the women's sprint and an extraordinary 1,2,3,4 for Norway in the men's sprint with Ole Einar Bjørndalen coming out on top.

Drama started on the second day with reigning champion, Andrea Henkel disqualified before the women's pursuit even started after she accidentally loaded her rifle with live ammunition and fired a round during a pre-race practice, leaving Helena Jonsson from Sweden to capture a surprise gold medal, moving into the medal positions from fifth place only after shooting clear on the final shoot.

Then during the men's 12.5 km pursuit, 15 competitors at least, including race leader and eventual winner Ole Einar Bjørndalen, skied the wrong way at the start of the first lap. Just after leaving the start, the athletes skied over a bridge instead of around it, which was a course change from the previous day's sprint competition. Following a complaint from the Russian team, a race jury gave nine athletes a one-minute time penalty, relegating Bjørndalen from first to the bronze medal position and awarding the gold medal to the Russian Maxim Tchoudov. However, a counter complaint by seven other member states led to the Appeal Jury reverting to the original result. It was a record 12th World Championship gold medal for Bjørndalen. Because the world championships count towards the World Cup, the win was Bjørndalen's 86th victory, equaling the winter-sport record of 86 World Cup victories by Swedish Alpine skier Ingemar Stenmark.

The men's individual saw another victory for Bjørndalen, taking his tally of World Cup victories to 87, and breaking Stenmark's record that had stood since 1989. The women's individual saw Wilhelm win her second gold medal of the Championships.

The relay events started with the mixed relay event and in a very close competition France, Sweden and Germany were within 10 seconds of each other at the final change over with France coming out on top to win their first title in this event.

The mass start for men saw Bjørndalen going for his 4th victory of the championships, and into the last shooting stage he was comfortably in the lead but then with 2 shots missed, Dominik Landertinger and Christoph Sumann from Austria and Ivan Tcherezov from Russia were able all get within 5 seconds of him. On the last skiing lap Landertinger was able to ski quickest, securing Austria their first medal of the championships, with Bjørndalen having to settle for fourth. The women's relay was won by Russia with an impressive margin over Germany with France taking bronze.

The women's mass start was a close-run race with 4 women battling it out for gold after the final shoot, with Olga Zaitseva coming home comfortably at the end. Kati Wilhelm, wearing bib one, had been expected to contend for gold having already collected 2 gold medals earlier in the championships but after missing 7 targets she came home last. The men's relay brought the championships to a close with another close race with Austria, Norway and Germany all in contention right up the final standing shoot of the final leg. Bjørndalen on the anchor leg for Norway shot clear whereas Sumann missed one target and the Norwegian had enough in him to ski his country to gold, collecting his fourth gold of the championships in the process.

== Schedule ==
The provisional schedule of the event is below.

Date	Time	Events
February 14	8:45 KST	Women's 7.5 km sprint
February 14	11:15 KST	Men's 10 km sprint
February 15	9:00 KST	Women's 10 km pursuit
February 15	11:15 KST	Men's 12.5 km pursuit
February 17	6:15 KST	Men's 20 km individual
February 18	10:15 KST	Women's 15 km individual
February 19	10:00 KST	Mixed relay
February 21	9:15 KST	Men's 15 km mass start
February 21	11:15 KST	Women's 4 × 6 km relay
February 22	9:00 KST	Women's 12.5 km mass start
February 22	11:15 KST	Men's 4 × 7.5 km relay

== Medal winners ==
=== Men ===
Event	Gold		Silver		Bronze	
10 km sprint	Ole Einar Bjørndalen; Norway	24:16.5 (1+1)	Lars Berger; Norway	24:17.7 (1+1)	Halvard Hanevold; Norway	24:29.0 (0+0)
12.5 km pursuit	Ole Einar Bjørndalen; Norway	31:46.7 (0+2+0+2)	Maxim Tchoudov; Russia	32:28.4 (0+0+1+2)	Alexander Os; Norway	32:39.5 (0+0+2+1)
20 km individual	Ole Einar Bjørndalen; Norway	52:28.0 (0+0+2+1)	Christoph Stephan; Germany	52:42.1 (1+0+0+0)	Jakov Fak; Croatia	52:45.1 (0+0+0+1)
4 × 7.5 km relay	Norway Emil Hegle Svendsen; Lars Berger; Halvard Hanevold; Ole Einar Bjørndalen	1:08:04.1 (0+0) (1+3) (0+0) (1+3) (0+0) (0+0) (0+2) (0+1)	Austria Daniel Mesotitsch; Simon Eder; Dominik Landertinger; Christoph Sumann	1:08:16.7 (0+0) (0+1) (0+1) (0+0) (0+1) (0+2) (0+0) (0+2)	Germany Michael Rösch; Christoph Stephan; Arnd Peiffer; Michael Greis	1:08:36.8 (0+1) (0+1) (0+1) (0+3) (0+0) (0+1) (0+1) (0+2)
15 km mass start	Dominik Landertinger; Austria	38:32.5 (2+0+0+1)	Christoph Sumann; Austria	38:41.4 (2+0+0+1)	Ivan Tcherezov; Russia	38:48.4 (2+0+0+0)

=== Women ===
Event	Gold		Silver		Bronze	
7.5 km sprint	Kati Wilhelm; Germany	21:11.1 (0+0)	Simone Hauswald; Germany	21:21.0 (0+0)	Olga Zaitseva; Russia	21:38.2 (0+0)
10 km pursuit	Helena Jonsson; Sweden	34:12.4 (2+0+0+0)	Kati Wilhelm; Germany	34:30.6 (1+1+3+1)	Olga Zaitseva; Russia	34:36.4 (0+3+1+2)
15 km individual	Kati Wilhelm; Germany	44:03.1 (0+1+0+0)	Teja Gregorin; Slovenia	44:42.6 (0+0+0+1)	Tora Berger; Norway	44:49.6 (0+0+0+1)
4 × 6 km relay	Russia Svetlana Sleptsova; Anna Boulygina; Olga Medvedtseva; Olga Zaitseva	1:13:12.9 (0+2) (0+0) (0+0) (0+3) (0+1) (0+2) (0+0) (0+1)	Germany Martina Beck; Magdalena Neuner; Andrea Henkel; Kati Wilhelm	1:14:28.0 (0+1) (0+1) (0+2) (2+3) (0+1) (0+1) (0+2) (1+3)	France Marie-Laure Brunet; Sylvie Becaert; Marie Dorin; Sandrine Bailly	1:14:40.4 (0+0) (0+1) (0+2) (0+3) (0+0) (0+3) (0+1) (1+3)
12.5 km mass start	Olga Zaitseva; Russia	34:18.3 (0+0+1+1)	Anastasiya Kuzmina; Slovakia	34:25.8 (0+0+1+1)	Helena Jonsson; Sweden	34:30.6 (0+0+1+1)

=== Mixed ===
Event	Gold		Silver		Bronze	
2 × 6 + 2 × 7.5 km W+M relay	France Marie-Laure Brunet; Sylvie Becaert; Vincent Defrasne; Simon Fourcade	1:10:30.0 (0+0) (0+1) (0+0) (0+1) (0+2) (0+0) (0+0) (0+2)	Sweden Helena Jonsson; Anna Carin Olofsson-Zidek; David Ekholm; Carl Johan Bergman	1:10:36.2 (0+0) (0+0) (0+0) (0+1) (0+0) (0+0) (0+0) (0+2)	Germany Andrea Henkel; Simone Hauswald; Arnd Peiffer; Michael Greis	1:10:39.0 (0+0) (0+2) (0+2) (0+1) (0+0) (0+2) (0+1) (0+3)

== Medal summary ==
Rank	Nation	Gold	Silver	Bronze	Total
1	Norway (NOR)	4	1	3	8
2	Germany (GER)	2	4	2	8
3	Russia (RUS)	2	1	3	6
4	Austria (AUT)	1	2	0	3
5	Sweden (SWE)	1	1	1	3
6	France (FRA)	1	0	1	2
7	Slovakia (SVK)	0	1	0	1
7	Slovenia (SLO)	0	1	0	1
9	Croatia (CRO)	0	0	1	1
Totals (9 entries)		11	11	11	33
