= Evgeny Abramenko =

Belarusian biathlete (born 1987)

Personal information
- Born: 26 February 1987 (age 39) Vitebsk, Byelorussian SSR, Soviet Union

Sport
- Sport: Skiing
Medal record
Men's biathlon
Representing Belarus
Youth Junior Championships
Gold medal – first place	2007 Martell	15 km individual
Youth World Championships
Bronze medal – third place	2006 Presque Isle	3 × 7.5 km relay
- Updated on 28 February 2013

Evgeny Sergeevich Abramenko (Belarusian: Яўге́н Сярге́евіч Абра́менка, tr. Yawhen Syarheyevich Abramenka; Łacinka: Jaŭhien Siarhiejevič Abramienka; Russian: Евге́ний Серге́евич Абра́менко, tr. Yevgeniy Sergeyevich Abramenko; born 26 February 1987 in Vitebsk) is a retired Belarusian biathlete.

He competed in the 2010 Winter Olympics for Belarus. His best finish is 11th, as a member of the Belarusian relay team. His best individual performance is 40th, in the pursuit.

As of February 2013, his best performance at the Biathlon World Championships, is 6th, in the 2012 mixed relay. His best individual performance in a World Championships is 26th, in the 2011 individual. He won a gold medal in the 2007 World Junior Championships, in the individual.

As of February 2013, his best Biathlon World Cup finish is 5th, in the men's relay at Oberhof in 2008/09 . His best individual finish is 19th, achieved three times. His best overall finish in the Biathlon World Cup is 52nd, in 2010/11.
