= Biathlon at the 2010 Winter Olympics =

Biathlon at the XXI Olympic Winter Games
- Venue: Whistler Olympic Park
- Dates: 13–26 February
- Competitors: 221 from 37 nations

The biathlon competition at the 2010 Winter Olympics were held at Whistler Olympic Park in Whistler, British Columbia. The events were held between the 13th and 26 February 2010.

The men's individual biathlon was notable for the awarding of two silver medals due to two competitors finishing with a tie (48:32.0). No bronze medal was awarded in this event.

In October 2020, the medals won by Evgeny Ustyugov in 2010 were revoked as a result of new tests for doping violations. In November 2024, almost 15 years after the Vancouver Olympic Games, the CAS rejected Ustyugov's appeal for the deprivation of his Olympic medals. In May 2025, the Swiss Federal Tribunal rejected the appeals of Ustyugov, leaving the International Olympic Committee to formally reallocate Ustyugov's medals to other athletes. In September 2025 the IOC Executive Board approved the medal reallocations.

== Medal summary ==
=== Medal table ===
Rank	Nation	Gold	Silver	Bronze	Total
1	Norway	3	2	0	5
2	France	2	1	3	6
3	Germany	2	1	2	5
4	Slovakia	1	2	0	3
5	Russia	1	1	0	2
6	Sweden	1	0	1	2
7	Austria	0	2	1	3
8	Belarus	0	1	1	2
9	Kazakhstan	0	1	0	1
10	Croatia	0	0	1	1
Totals (10 entries)		10	11	9	30

=== Men's events ===
Event	Gold		Silver		Bronze	
Individual	Emil Hegle Svendsen; Norway	48:22.5	Ole Einar Bjørndalen; Norway; Sergey Novikov; Belarus	48:32.0	Not awarded	
Sprint	Vincent Jay; France	24:07.8	Emil Hegle Svendsen; Norway	24:20.0	Jakov Fak; Croatia	24:21.8
Pursuit	Björn Ferry; Sweden	33:38.4	Christoph Sumann; Austria	33:54.9	Vincent Jay; France	34:06.6
Mass start	Martin Fourcade; France	35:46.2	Pavol Hurajt; Slovakia	35:52.3	Christoph Sumann; Austria	36:01.6
Relay	Norway; Halvard Hanevold; Tarjei Bø; Emil Hegle Svendsen; Ole Einar Bjørndalen	1:21:38.1	Austria; Simon Eder; Daniel Mesotitsch; Dominik Landertinger; Christoph Sumann	1:22:16.7	Sweden; Fredrik Lindström; Carl Johan Bergman; Mattias Nilsson; Björn Ferry	1:23:02.0

=== Women's events ===
Event	Gold		Silver		Bronze	
Individual	Tora Berger; Norway	40:52.8	Elena Khrustaleva; Kazakhstan	41:13.5	Darya Domracheva; Belarus	41:21.0
Sprint	Anastasiya Kuzmina; Slovakia	19:55.6	Magdalena Neuner; Germany	19:57.1	Marie Dorin; France	20:06.5
Pursuit	Magdalena Neuner; Germany	30:16.0	Anastasiya Kuzmina; Slovakia	30:28.3	Marie-Laure Brunet; France	30:44.3
Mass start	Magdalena Neuner; Germany	35:19.6	Olga Zaitseva; Russia	35:25.1	Simone Hauswald; Germany	35:26.9
Relay	Russia; Svetlana Sleptsova; Anna Bogaliy-Titovets; Olga Medvedtseva; Olga Zaitseva	1:09:36.3	France; Marie-Laure Brunet; Sylvie Becaert; Marie Dorin; Sandrine Bailly	1:10:09.1	Germany; Kati Wilhelm; Simone Hauswald; Martina Beck; Andrea Henkel	1:10:13.4

== Events ==
A total of ten biathlon events were held at Vancouver 2010:

Men	Women
4 x 7.5 km relay	4 x 6 km relay
10 km sprint	7.5 km sprint
12.5 km pursuit	10 km pursuit
15 km mass start	12.5 km mass start
20 km individual	15 km individual

== Competition schedule ==
All times are Pacific Standard Time (UTC-8).

Day	Date	Start	Finish	Event
Day 2	Saturday 2010-02-13	13:00	14:10	7.5 km sprint women
Day 3	Sunday 2010-02-14	11:15	12:25	10 km sprint men
Day 5	Tuesday 2010-02-16	10:30	11:10	10 km pursuit women
Day 5	Tuesday 2010-02-16	12:45	13:25	12.5 km pursuit men
Day 7	Thursday 2010-02-18	10:00	11:40	15 km individual women
Day 7	Thursday 2010-02-18	13:00	14:35	20 km individual men
Day 10	Sunday 2010-02-21	10:45	11:25	15 km mass start men
Day 10	Sunday 2010-02-21	13:00	13:45	12.5 km mass start women
Day 12	Tuesday 2010-02-23	11:30	12:40	4 x 6 km relay women
Day 15	Friday 2010-02-26	11:30	12:40	4 x 7.5 km relay men

== Qualification ==
=== Athlete quotas ===
Athlete quotas: 220 athletes (113 men, 107 women)
A NOC may enter no more than 12 athletes (6 men and 6 women), and no more than 4 athletes per event.

Quotas by events:

- Individual: 88 (men's), 87 (women's)
- Sprint: 88 (men's), 87 (women's)
- Pursuit: 60 athletes^{1}
- Mass start: 30 athletes
- Relay: 20 teams (80 athletes)

^{1}Qualification to the pursuit is based on results from the sprint

=== Eligibility criteria ===
All competitors must comply with one of the three minimum qualifications standards set forward by the IBU:

- The athlete must have achieved a time that is less than 20% higher than the average time of the top 3 during a sprint or individual in the European Cup (IBU Cup), including the European championships, during the 2010/2009 or the 2009/2008 season.

or

- The athlete must achieve a top-half finish in the 2010 or 2009 World Junior Championships.

or

- The athlete must have participated in a Biathlon world cup or world championships during the 2008/2009 or 2009/2010 season.
- All members of a relay team must comply with those criteria.

Additionally, only athletes representing an NOC that is recognized by the IOC and member of the IBU can participate in the games.

=== Qualification criteria ===
All 220 quota places will be awarded using a point ranking combining the 2008 and 2009 Biathlon World Championships.

Men's

- Rank 1 to 5: six athletes
- Rank 6 to 20: five athletes
- Rank 21 to 28: one athlete

Women's

- Rank 1 to 5: six athletes
- Rank 6 to 15: five athletes
- Rank 16 to 20: four athletes
- Rank 21 to 27: one athlete

== Participating nations ==
According to final report by VANOC these were the final participation numbers:

Nations	Men's	Women's	Total
Australia	1	0	1
Austria	6	0	6
Belarus	5	5	9
Bosnia and Herzegovina	0	1	1
Bulgaria	5	1	6
Canada	4	4	8
China	1	5	6
Croatia	1	1	2
Czech Republic	5	5	10
Denmark	1	0	1
Estonia	5	4	9
Finland	2	2	4
France	6	5	11
Germany	6	6	12
Great Britain	1	0	1
Greece	1	1	2
Hungary	1	0	1
Italy	5	5	10
Japan	1	1	2
Kazakhstan	5	4	9
Latvia	5	4	9
Lithuania	0	1	1
Moldova	1	1	2
Norway	6	5	11
New Zealand	0	1	1
Poland	2	5	7
Romania	0	5	5
Russia	5	6	11
Slovenia	4	4	8
South Korea	1	1	2
Spain	0	1	1
Serbia	1	0	1
Switzerland	5	1	6
Slovakia	5	5	10
Sweden	5	5	10
Ukraine	5	6	11
United States	5	4	9
Total: 37 NOCs	112	105	217

Rejected quota places: Finland earned five spots in both genders, but decided to send only two men and two women. Poland qualified 5 men, but sent only two men. Slovenia had earned 5 spots each, but decided to send only four women and men. Great Britain (women), Belgium (men), the Netherlands (men), and Austria (women) rejected their single spots earned in either men's or women's. Greenland has no NOC, so Greenland's spot earned in men's competition was used by Denmark.

== See also ==
- Biathlon at the 2010 Winter Paralympics
