= Vasja Rupnik =

Slovenian biathlete (born 1977)

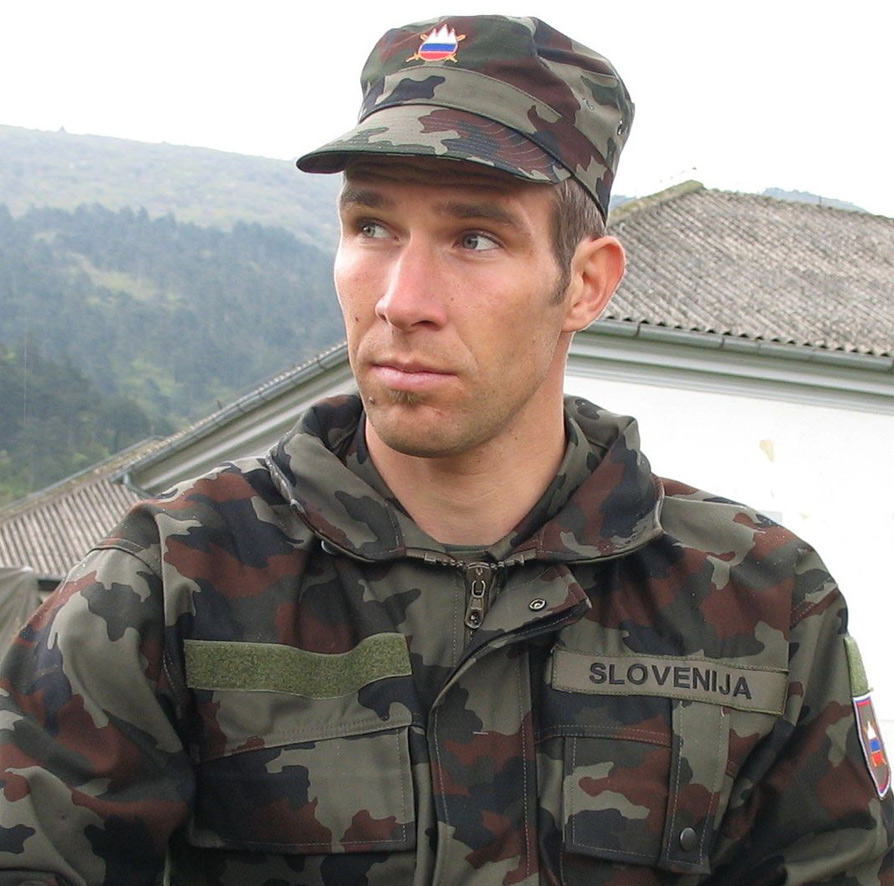
Vasja Rupnik in military uniform

Vasja Rupnik (born June 6, 1977 in Ljubljana, Slovenia) is a Slovenian biathlete.

Rupnik represented Slovenia at the 2010 Winter Olympics.
