= Dominik Landertinger =

Austrian biathlete (born 1988)

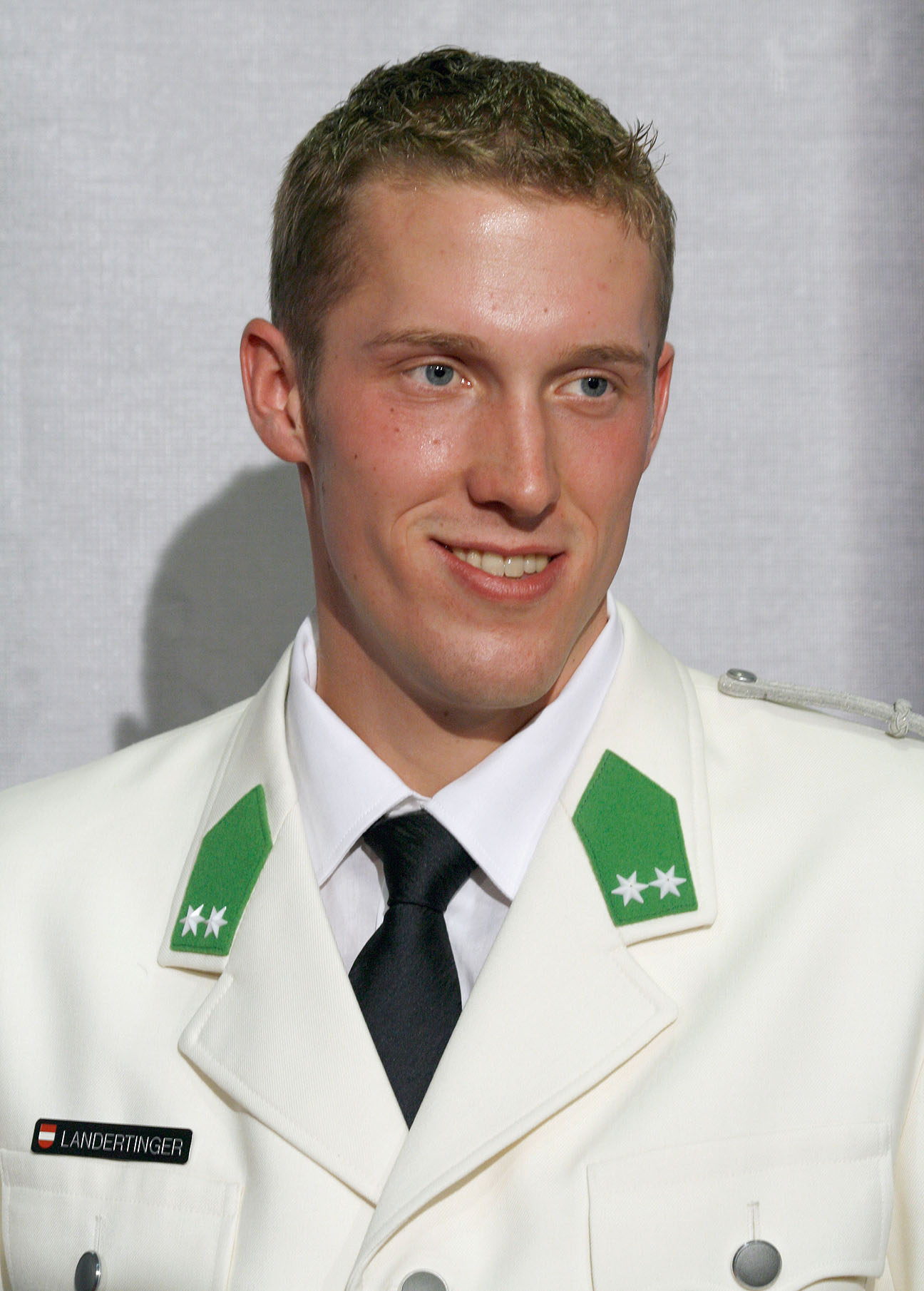
- Dominik Landertinger in November 2009

Personal information
- Born: 13 March 1988 (age 38) Braunau am Inn, Austria
- Height: 1.88 m (6 ft 2 in)

Sport

Professional information
- Sport: Biathlon
- Club: HSV Hochfilzen
- World Cup debut: 13 December 2007

Olympic Games
- Teams: 3 (2010, 2014, 2018)
- Medals: 4 (0 gold)

World Championships
- Teams: 8 (2009–2017, 2020)
- Medals: 5 (1 gold)

World Cup
- Seasons: 13 (2007/08–2019/20)
- Individual victories: 2
- All victories: 5
- Individual podiums: 17
- All podiums: 36
- Discipline titles: 1: 1 Mass start (2008–09)
Medal record
Olympic Games
Silver medal – second place	2010 Vancouver	4 × 7.5 km relay
Silver medal – second place	2014 Sochi	10 km sprint
Silver medal – second place	2014 Sochi	4 × 7.5 km relay
Bronze medal – third place	2018 Pyeongchang	20 km individual
World Championships
Gold medal – first place	2009 Pyeongchang	15 km mass start
Silver medal – second place	2009 Pyeongchang	4 × 7.5 km relay
Silver medal – second place	2016 Oslo	20 km individual
Bronze medal – third place	2017 Hochfilzen	4 × 7.5 km relay
Bronze medal – third place	2020 Antholz	20 km individual
Youth World Championships
Gold medal – first place	2007 Martell	3 × 7.5 km relay
Silver medal – second place	2006 Presque Isle	3 × 7.5 km relay
Silver medal – second place	2007 Martell	7.5 km sprint
Bronze medal – third place	2006 Presque Isle	12.5 km individual

Dominik Landertinger (German pronunciation: [ˈdɔmɪnɪk ˈlandɐtɪŋɐ]; born 13 March 1988) is a retired Austrian biathlete.

== Life and career ==
Landertinger debuted in the 2007–08 season, and his big breakthrough came during the 2008–09 season, where he, as of 22 March 2015, has fourteen podium finishes, including a gold medal in the 15 km mass start at the 2009 World Championships in Pyeongchang and a win in the 15 km mass start in Khanty-Mansiysk at the last round of the 2009–10 season. He also finished second in the men's relay in the same World Championships, alongside Daniel Mesotitsch, Simon Eder and Christoph Sumann.

He represented Austria at the 2010 Winter Olympics, 2014 Winter Olympics, and 2018 Winter Olympics. He has won 4 medals: silver in the Men's relay in 2010, a silver and a bronze in the Men's sprint and in the Men's relay in 2014, and a bronze in the Men's individual in 2018. Both of the relays together with Daniel Mesotitsch, Simon Eder and Christoph Sumann.

== Biathlon results ==
All results are sourced from the International Biathlon Union.

=== Olympic Games ===
4 medals (2 silver, 2 bronze)

Event	Individual	Sprint	Pursuit	Mass start	Relay	Mixed relay
(Canada) 2010 Vancouver	23rd	34th	14th	7th	Silver	—N/a
(Russia) 2014 Sochi	5th	Silver	10th	7th	Bronze	—
(South Korea) 2018 Pyeongchang	Bronze	16th	22nd	12th	4th	—

*The mixed relay was added as an event in 2014.

=== World Championships ===
5 medals (1 gold, 2 silver, 2 bronze)

Event	Individual	Sprint	Pursuit	Mass start	Relay	Mixed relay
(South Korea) 2009 Pyeongchang	6th	17th	34th	Gold	Silver	—
(Russia) 2011 Khanty-Mansiysk	16th	49th	46th	—	9th	7th
(Germany) 2012 Ruhpolding	15th	28th	31st	24th	5th	—
(Czech Republic) 2013 Nové Město	14th	15th	5th	6th	5th	17th
(Finland) 2015 Kontiolahti	28th	39th	15th	24th	5th	—
(Norway) 2016 Oslo	Silver	9th	14th	15th	4th	5th
(Austria) 2017 Hochfilzen	26th	17th	15th	21st	Bronze	9th
(Sweden) 2019 Östersund	48th	21st	34th	21st	8th	17th
(Italy) 2020 Antholz-Anterselva	Bronze	31st	40th	17th	—	8th

*During Olympic seasons competitions are only held for those events not included in the Olympic program.

=== Junior/Youth World Championships ===
4 medals (1 gold, 2 silver, 1 bronze)

Event	Individual	Sprint	Pursuit	Relay
(France) 2004 Haute Maurienne	9th	DNF	—	11th
(Finland) 2005 Kontiolahti	7th	DSQ	—	4th
(United States) 2006 Presque Isle	Bronze	22nd	22nd	Silver
(Italy) 2007 Martell-Val Martello	33rd	Silver	4th	Gold
(Germany) 2008 Ruhpolding	11th	30th	14th	4th

=== Individual victories ===
2 victories (2 MS)

Season	Date	Location	Discipline	Level
2008–09; 1 victory (1 MS)	21 February 2009	(South Korea) Pyeongchang	15 km mass start	Biathlon World Championships
2009–10; 1 victory (1 MS)	27 March 2010	(Russia) Khanty-Mansiysk	15 km mass start	Biathlon World Cup

*Results are from UIPMB and IBU races which include the Biathlon World Cup, Biathlon World Championships and the Winter Olympic Games.
