= Daniel Mesotitsch =

Austrian biathlete (born 1976)

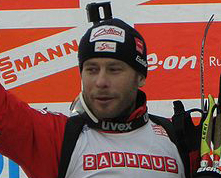

Personal information
- Full name: Daniel Mesotitsch
- Born: 22 May 1976 (age 50) Villach, Austria
- Height: 1.81 m (5 ft 11 in)

Sport

Professional information
- Sport: Biathlon
- World Cup debut: 8 December 1999
- Retired: 26 March 2019

Olympic Games
- Teams: 4 (2002, 2006, 2010, 2014)
- Medals: 2 (0 gold)

World Championships
- Teams: 13 (2001, 2002, 2003, 2004, 2005, 2007, 2008, 2009, 2011, 2012, 2013, 2015, 2017)
- Medals: 3 (0 gold)

World Cup
- Seasons: 18 (1999/00–2017/18)
- Individual races: 322
- Individual victories: 3
- All victories: 8
- Individual podiums: 7
- All podiums: 27
Medal record
Men's biathlon
Representing Austria
Olympic Games
Silver medal – second place	2010 Vancouver	4 × 7.5 km relay
Silver medal – second place	2014 Sochi	4 × 7.5 km relay
World Championships
Silver medal – second place	2009 Pyeongchang	4 × 7.5 km relay
Bronze medal – third place	2005 Hochfilzen	4 × 7.5 km relay
Bronze medal – third place	2017 Hochfilzen	4 × 7.5 km relay
- Updated on 13 August 2017

Daniel Mesotitsch (born 22 May 1976) is an Austrian former biathlete.

== Career ==
Mesotitsch originally competed in cross-country skiing. However, in 1997 he was injured in a car crash and took up shooting during his recovery when he was unable to undertake ski training. He subsequently switched to biathlon.

He has competed in four Winter Olympics, in 2002, 2006, 2010 and 2014. He won 2 medals: silver in the Men's relay in 2010, and a bronze in Men's relay in 2014. Both of the relays together with Dominik Landertinger, Simon Eder and Christoph Sumann.

He was named Sportsman of the Year in 2011 in his home state of Carinthia.

Mesotitsch announced on 22 March 2019 that he would retire from the sport on 26 March 2019 after the Austrian Championships.

== Biathlon results ==
All results are sourced from the International Biathlon Union.

=== Olympic Games ===
2 medals (1 silver, 1 bronze)

Event	Individual	Sprint	Pursuit	Mass start	Relay	Mixed relay
(United States) 2002 Salt Lake City	64th	—	—	—N/a	—	—N/a
(Italy) 2006 Turin	59th	—	—	—	17th	—N/a
(Canada) 2010 Vancouver	9th	45th	41st	5th	Silver	—N/a
(Russia) 2014 Sochi	40th	38th	37th	—	Bronze	9th

*Mass start was added as an event in 2006, with the mixed relay being added in 2014.

=== World Championships ===
3 medals (1 silver, 2 bronze)

Event	Individual	Sprint	Pursuit	Mass start	Relay	Mixed relay
(Slovenia) 2001 Pokljuka	—	—	—	—	8th	—N/a
(Norway) 2002 Oslo Holmenkollen	—N/a	—N/a	—N/a	5th	—N/a	—N/a
(Russia) 2003 Khanty-Mansiysk	12th	—	—	—	8th	—N/a
(Germany) 2004 Oberhof	56th	56th	DNS	—	9th	—N/a
(Austria) 2005 Hochfilzen	29th	40th	DNS	—	Bronze	—
(Italy) 2007 Antholz-Anterselva	12th	26th	35th	29th	6th	—
(Sweden) 2008 Östersund	60th	49th	31st	—	4th	—
(South Korea) 2009 Pyeongchang	20th	29th	24th	25th	Silver	—
(Russia) 2011 Khanty-Mansiysk	50th	38th	26th	—	9th	—
(Germany) 2012 Ruhpolding	13th	4th	4th	14th	5th	—
(Czech Republic) 2013 Nové Město	45th	33rd	27th	—	5th	—
(Finland) 2015 Kontiolahti	54th	41st	26th	—	5th	—
(Austria) 2017 Hochfilzen	15th	50th	50th	—	Bronze	—

*During Olympic seasons competitions are only held for those events not included in the Olympic program.
**Mixed relay was added as an event in 2005.

=== Individual victories ===
3 victories (2 In, 1 Pu)

Season	Date	Location	Discipline	Level
2001–02; 1 victory (1 In)	24 January 2002	(Italy) Antholz-Anterselva	20 km individual	Biathlon World Cup
2009–10; 1 victory (1 Pu)	24 January 2010	(Italy) Antholz-Anterselva	12.5 km pursuit	Biathlon World Cup
2010–11; 1 victory (1 In)	16 December 2010	(Slovenia) Pokljuka	20 km individual	Biathlon World Cup

*Results are from UIPMB and IBU races which include the Biathlon World Cup, Biathlon World Championships and the Winter Olympic Games.
