= Simon Eder =

Austrian biathlete (born 1983)

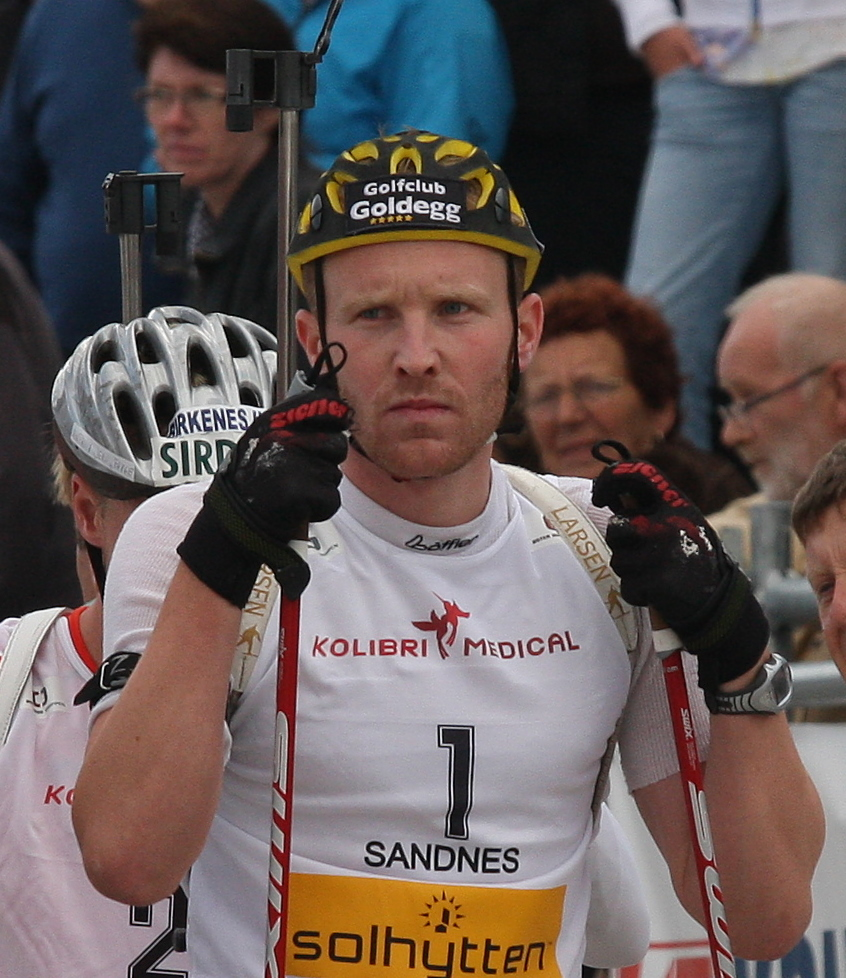
- Eder in 2009

Personal information
- Nationality: Austrian
- Born: 23 February 1983 (age 43) Zell am See, Austria
- Height: 1.85 m (6 ft 1 in)
- Weight: 79 kg (174 lb)

Sport

Professional information
- Sport: Biathlon
- Club: HSV Saalfelden
- World Cup debut: 18 January 2003

Olympic Games
- Teams: 5 (2010, 2014, 2018, 2022, 2026)
- Medals: 2 (0 gold)

World Championships
- Teams: 12 (2007–2021)
- Medals: 5 (0 gold)

World Cup
- Seasons: 18 (2002/03–2003/04, 2005/06–)
- Individual races: 417
- All races: 534
- Individual victories: 3
- All victories: 5
- Individual podiums: 15
- All podiums: 26
Medal record
Olympic Games
Silver medal – second place	2010 Vancouver	4 × 7.5 km relay
Silver medal – second place	2014 Sochi	4 × 7.5 km relay
World Championships
Silver medal – second place	2009 Pyeongchang	4 × 7.5 km relay
Silver medal – second place	2021 Pokljuka	Mixed relay
Bronze medal – third place	2016 Oslo	20 km individual
Bronze medal – third place	2017 Hochfilzen	15 km mass start
Bronze medal – third place	2017 Hochfilzen	4 × 7.5 km relay
Junior World Championships
Gold medal – first place	2002 Ridnaun	15 km individual
Bronze medal – third place	2004 Haute Maurienne	10 km sprint

Simon Eder (born 23 February 1983) is an Austrian former biathlete.

== Career ==
His first World Cup win was in the Khanty-Mansiysk mass-start race on 29 March 2009.

Eder represented Austria at the 2010 Winter Olympics and in 2014 Winter Olympics. He won 2 medals: silver in the Men's relay in 2010, and a bronze in Men's relay in 2014. Both of the relays together with Daniel Mesotitsch, Dominik Landertinger and Christoph Sumann.

He is known for his fast shooting times, having recorded sub-20 second performances on the shooting range. He is the son of former biathlete and Austrian national biathlon coach Alfred Eder.

== Biathlon results ==
All results are sourced from the International Biathlon Union.

=== Olympic Games ===
2 medals (2 silver)

Event	Individual	Sprint	Pursuit	Mass start	Relay	Mixed relay
(Canada) 2010 Vancouver	6th	11th	4th	25th	Silver	—N/a
(Russia) 2014 Sochi	4th	7th	8th	16th	Silver	—
(South Korea) 2018 Pyeongchang	11th	28th	14th	14th	4th	10th
(China) 2022 Beijing	20th	18th	37th	7th	10th	10th
(Italy) 2026 Milano Cortina	34th	46th	36th	—	10th	7th

:*The mixed relay was added as an event in 2014.

=== World Championships ===
5 medals (2 silver, 3 bronze)

Event	Individual	Sprint	Pursuit	Mass start	Relay	Mixed relay	Single mixed relay
(Italy) 2007 Antholz-Anterselva	68th	—	—	—	6th	—	—N/a
(Sweden) 2008 Östersund	20th	33rd	23rd	15th	4th	—	—N/a
(South Korea) 2009 Pyeongchang	—	8th	14th	8th	Silver	—	—N/a
(Russia) 2011 Khanty-Mansiysk	17th	17th	14th	9th	9th	—	—N/a
(Germany) 2012 Ruhpolding	23rd	46th	34th	—	5th	—	—N/a
(Czech Republic) 2013 Nové Město	42nd	10th	12th	18th	5th	—	—N/a
(Finland) 2015 Kontiolahti	20th	46th	12th	19th	5th	5th	—N/a
(Norway) 2016 Oslo	Bronze	27th	16th	11th	4th	5th	—N/a
(Austria) 2017 Hochfilzen	12th	22nd	12th	Bronze	Bronze	9th	—N/a
(Sweden) 2019 Östersund	DNF	15th	10th	7th	8th	—	—
(Italy) 2020 Rasen-Antholz	40th	37th	12th	—	6th	—	6th
(Slovenia) 2021 Pokljuka	7th	16th	9th	4th	10th	Silver	6th
(Germany) 2023 Oberhof	DNS	23rd	37th	—	—	4th	—
(Czech Republic) 2024 Nové Město na Moravě	12th	62nd	—	25th	12th	6th	9th
(Switzerland) 2025 Lenzerheide	41st	26th	32nd	—	12th	17th	8th

*During Olympic seasons competitions are only held for those events not included in the Olympic program.
**The single mixed relay was added as an event in 2019.

=== Junior/Youth World Championships ===
2 medals (1 gold, 1 bronze)

Event	Individual	Sprint	Pursuit	Relay
(Italy) 2002 Ridnaun-Val Ridanna	Gold	35th	17th	9th
(Poland) 2003 Kościelisko	13th	18th	9th	8th
(France) 2004 Haute Maurienne	4th	Bronze	7th	—

=== Individual victories ===
3 victories (2 Pu, 1 MS)

Season	Date	Location	Discipline	Level
2008–09; 1 victory (1 MS)	29 March 2009	(Russia) Khanty-Mansiysk	15 km mass start	Biathlon World Cup
2013–14; 1 victory (1 Pu)	22 March 2014	(Norway) Oslo Holmenkollen	12.5 km pursuit	Biathlon World Cup
2015–16; 1 victory (1 Pu)	9 January 2016	(Germany) Ruhpolding	12.5 km pursuit	Biathlon World Cup

*Results are from UIPMB and IBU races which include the Biathlon World Cup, Biathlon World Championships and the Winter Olympic Games.
