= Christoph Sumann =

Austrian biathlete

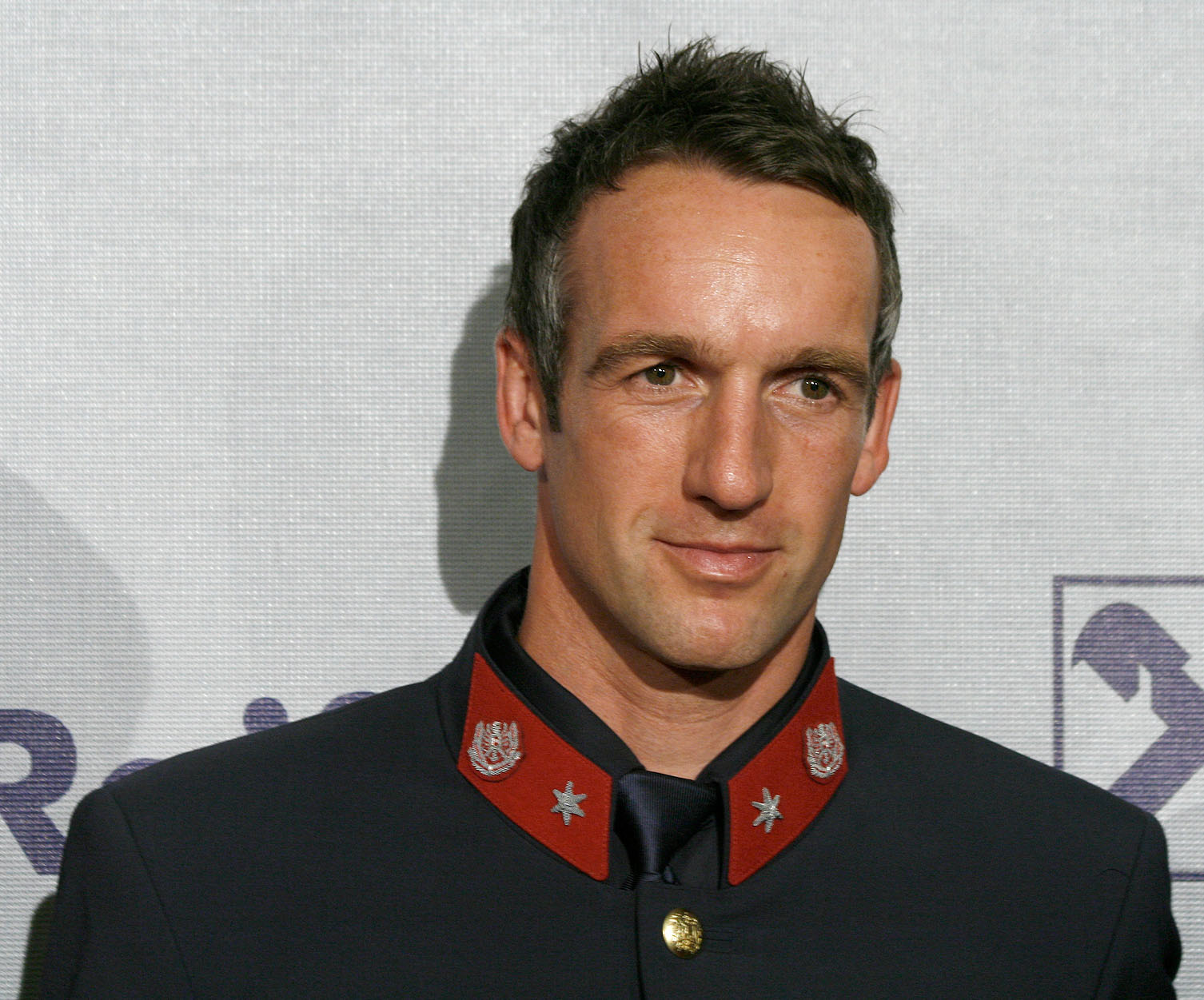

Personal information
- Full name: Christoph Sumann
- Nickname: Sumi
- Born: 19 January 1976 (age 50) Judenburg, Austria
- Height: 1.81 m (5 ft 11 in)

Sport

Professional information
- Sport: Biathlon
- Club: Union Sportverein; Frojach-Katsch
- World Cup debut: 7 December 2000
- Retired: 22 March 2014

Olympic Games
- Teams: 4 (2002, 2006, 2010, 2014)
- Medals: 3 (0 gold)

World Championships
- Teams: 11 (2001, 2002, 2003, 2004, 2005, 2007, 2008, 2009, 2011, 2012, 2013)
- Medals: 4 (0 gold)

World Cup
- Seasons: 14 (2000/01–2013/14)
- Individual victories: 6
- All victories: 11
- Individual podiums: 17
- All podiums: 34
- Discipline titles: 1: 1 Individual (2009–10)
Medal record
Men's biathlon
Representing Austria
Olympic Games
Silver medal – second place	2010 Vancouver	12.5 km pursuit
Silver medal – second place	2010 Vancouver	4 × 7.5 km relay
Silver medal – second place	2014 Sochi	4 × 7.5 km relay
Bronze medal – third place	2010 Vancouver	15 km mass start
World Championships
Silver medal – second place	2009 Pyeongchang	15 km mass start
Silver medal – second place	2009 Pyeongchang	4 × 7.5 km relay
Bronze medal – third place	2005 Hochfilzen	4 × 7.5 km relay
Bronze medal – third place	2011 Khanty-Mansiysk	20 km individual

Christoph "Sumi" Sumann (19 January 1976) is a former Austrian biathlete.

== Life and career ==
As was the case with many of his fellow biathletes, Sumann switched over from cross-country skiing, which he had been doing since childhood. By the mid-1990s had he entered junior ski team of Austria and later on progressed to senior level. He was a skillful sprinter at the time.

Sumann began as a biathlete in 2000 and would compete in biathlon at the top level for 11 seasons.

His first World Cup win came in 2002–03 season and he finished 15th in the World Cup total. In 2006–07 Biathlon World Cup Sumann won the a mass start race and wore the red bib of the leader of the mass start cup up until the last stage of the season, the fact is quite outstanding for Austrians in biathlon despite the fact that he eventually lost it to Ole Einar Bjørndalen, who thus won the mass start world cup that season.

His most brilliant season was the 2009–10 Biathlon World Cup. He won two silvers at the 2010 Winter Olympics in the relay and the pursuit, being runner-up in the World Cup total along with title in the individual cup made him one of the most decorated athletes of that season.

The 2010–11 Biathlon World Cup was fraught with hardships for Sumann since he caught intestinal disease in Östersund, Sweden in December and he had to combat it throughout the season. However, he came through at the World Championships when he won a bronze medal in the 20 km individual.

Sumann retired from the sport at the end of the 2013–14 season.

== Personal life ==
- Coached by Gösweiner Reinhard at the club Union Sportverein Frojach-Katsch, Sumann is a policeman in his homeland. Besides, he is married and has two children, a daughter Lea and a son Felix.

== Biathlon results ==
All results are sourced from the International Biathlon Union.

=== Olympic Games ===
4 medals (2 silver, 2 bronze)

Event	Individual	Sprint	Pursuit	Mass start	Relay	Mixed relay
(United States) 2002 Salt Lake City	22nd	DNF	—	—N/a	6th	—N/a
(Italy) 2006 Turin	—	15th	7th	9th	17th	—N/a
(Canada) 2010 Vancouver	8th	12th	Silver	Bronze	Silver	—N/a
(Russia) 2014 Sochi	24th	20th	12th	27th	Bronze	—

*Mass start was added as an event in 2006, with the mixed relay being added in 2014.

=== World Championships ===
4 medals (2 silver, 2 bronze)

Event	Individual	Sprint	Pursuit	Mass start	Relay	Mixed relay
(Slovenia) 2001 Pokljuka	—	12th	24th	—	8th	—N/a
(Norway) 2002 Oslo Holmenkollen	—N/a	—N/a	—N/a	14th	—N/a	—N/a
(Russia) 2003 Khanty-Mansiysk	10th	8th	10th	29th	8th	—N/a
(Germany) 2004 Oberhof	66th	53rd	DNF	—	9th	—N/a
(Austria) 2005 Hochfilzen	42nd	—	—	—	Bronze	—
(Italy) 2007 Antholz-Anterselva	11th	30th	15th	7th	6th	—
(Sweden) 2008 Östersund	22nd	24th	17th	18th	4th	—
(South Korea) 2009 Pyeongchang	17th	DNF	—	Silver	Silver	—
(Russia) 2011 Khanty-Mansiysk	Bronze	27th	22nd	12th	9th	7th
(Germany) 2012 Ruhpolding	43rd	41st	42nd	—	5th	21st
(Czech Republic) 2013 Nové Město	—	—	—	—	5th	—

*During Olympic seasons competitions are only held for those events not included in the Olympic program.
**Mixed relay was added as an event in 2005.

=== Individual victories ===
6 victories (1 In, 1 Sp, 2 Pu, 2 MS)

Season	Date	Location	Discipline	Level
2001–02; 1 victory (1 Sp)	21 December 2001	(Slovakia) Brezno-Osrblie	10 km sprint	Biathlon World Cup
2006–07; 2 victories (1 Pu, 1 MS)	20 January 2007	(Slovenia) Pokljuka	12.5 km pursuit	Biathlon World Cup
2006–07; 2 victories (1 Pu, 1 MS)	21 January 2007	(Slovenia) Pokljuka	15 km mass start	Biathlon World Cup
2008–09; 1 victory (1 MS)	11 January 2009	(Germany) Oberhof	15 km mass start	Biathlon World Cup
2009–10; 1 victory (1 In)	17 December 2009	(Slovenia) Pokljuka	20 km individual	Biathlon World Cup
2012–13; 1 victory (1 Pu)	16 March 2013	(Russia) Khanty-Mansiysk	12.5 km pursuit	Biathlon World Cup

*Results are from UIPMB and IBU races which include the Biathlon World Cup, Biathlon World Championships and the Winter Olympic Games.
