= Biathlon at the 2006 Winter Olympics – Men's sprint =

Men's biathlon sprint at the XX Olympic Winter Games
- Venue: Cesana San Sicario
- Dates: 14 February 2006
- Competitors: 90 from 36 nations
- Winning time: 26:11.6

Medalists
1st place, gold medalist(s)		Sven Fischer	Germany
2nd place, silver medalist(s)		Halvard Hanevold	Norway
3rd place, bronze medalist(s)		Frode Andresen	Norway

The Men's 10 kilometre sprint biathlon competition at the 2006 Winter Olympics in Turin, Italy, was held on 14 February at Cesana San Sicario. Competitors raced over three loops of the 3.3 kilometre skiing course, shooting ten times, five prone and five standing. Each miss required a competitor to ski a 150-metre penalty loop.

Ole Einar Bjørndalen of Norway was the defending World and Olympic champion, but Germany's Michael Greis led the World Cup standings before the Torino Games, with three more Germans in the top six.

== Results ==
Two Austrian athletes were disqualified after the IOC determined they had violated the Anti-Doping rules; Wolfgang Rottmann had originally placed 27th, while Wolfgang Perner had placed 4th.

The race was held at 13:30.

Rank	Bib	Name	Country	Time	Penalties (P+S)	Deficit
1st place, gold medalist(s)	25	Sven Fischer	Germany	26:11.6	0 (0+0)	–
2nd place, silver medalist(s)	15	Halvard Hanevold	Norway	26:19.8	0 (0+0)	+8.2
3rd place, bronze medalist(s)	10	Frode Andresen	Norway	26:31.3	1 (0+1)	+19.7
4	13	Vincent Defrasne	France	26:54.2	1 (0+1)	+42.6
5	35	Ivan Tcherezov	Russia	27:09.0	0 (0+0)	+57.4
6	38	Ricco Groß	Germany	27:15.1	0 (0+0)	+1:03.5
7	74	Mattias Nilsson	Sweden	27:18.5	0 (0+0)	+1:06.9
8	31	Raphaël Poirée	France	27:19.0	1 (1+0)	+1:07.4
9	14	Maxim Tchoudov	Russia	27:20.5	0 (0+0)	+1:08.9
10	47	Zdeněk Vítek	Czech Republic	27:24.4	1 (0+1)	+1:12.8
11	39	Ole Einar Bjørndalen	Norway	27:25.5	3 (1+2)	+1:13.9
12	8	Ilmārs Bricis	Latvia	27:26.9	1 (1+0)	+1:15.3
13	56	Björn Ferry	Sweden	27:31.1	2 (0+2)	+1:19.5
14	19	Alexander Wolf	Germany	27:34.5	2 (0+2)	+1:22.9
15	24	Christoph Sumann	Austria	27:42.3	2 (1+1)	+1:30.7
16	37	Stian Eckhoff	Norway	27:48.0	2 (1+1)	+1:36.4
17	32	Zhang Chengye	China	27:50.9	3 (0+3)	+1:39.3
18	33	Julien Robert	France	27:54.1	0 (0+0)	+1:42.5
19	63	Tomasz Sikora	Poland	27:54.3	2 (1+1)	+1:42.7
20	21	Vitaliy Rudenchyk	Bulgaria	27:59.1	1 (0+1)	+1:47.5
21	1	Nikolay Kruglov	Russia	28:05.2	1 (1+0)	+1:53.6
22	72	Wilfried Pallhuber	Italy	28:05.6	1 (1+0)	+1:54.0
23	6	Sergei Tchepikov	Russia	28:08.1	1 (1+0)	+1:56.5
24	86	Rustam Valiullin	Belarus	28:08.4	2 (1+1)	+1:56.8
25	64	Wiesław Ziemianin	Poland	28:10.1	0 (0+0)	+1:58.5
26	59	Christian De Lorenzi	Italy	28:14.5	2 (1+1)	+2:02.9
27	28	Andriy Deryzemlya	Ukraine	28:15.2	2 (1+1)	+2:03.6
28	57	Oleg Ryzhenkov	Belarus	28:15.9	1 (0+1)	+2:04.3
29	45	Pavol Hurajt	Slovakia	28:17.8	1 (0+1)	+2:06.2
30	16	Sergei Novikov	Belarus	28:18.5	1 (1+0)	+2:06.9
31	55	Ferreol Cannard	France	28:19.7	1 (1+0)	+2:08.1
32	82	Ondřej Moravec	Czech Republic	28:20.3	1 (1+0)	+2:08.7
33	40	Michael Greis	Germany	28:22.9	3 (2+1)	+2:11.3
34	46	Olexander Bilanenko	Ukraine	28:26.6	0 (0+0)	+2:15.0
35	50	Tim Burke	United States	28:27.8	3 (1+2)	+2:16.2
36	36	Janez Marič	Slovenia	28:28.6	3 (2+1)	+2:17.0
37	89	David Ekholm	Sweden	28:33.3	2 (2+0)	+2:21.7
38	7	Hidenori Isa	Japan	28:37.1	1 (1+0)	+2:25.5
39	3	Rene Laurent Vuillermoz	Italy	28:46.7	4 (1+3)	+2:35.1
40	44	Indrek Tobreluts	Estonia	28:47.5	1 (1+0)	+2:35.9
41	54	David Leoni	Canada	28:50.4	1 (0+1)	+2:38.8
42	20	Roman Dostál	Czech Republic	28:50.6	3 (1+2)	+2:39.0
43	2	Matthias Simmen	Switzerland	28:56.3	3 (2+1)	+2:44.7
44	80	Ruslan Lysenko	Ukraine	28:56.6	2 (1+1)	+2:45.0
45	17	Paavo Puurunen	Finland	28:57.3	2 (1+1)	+2:45.7
46	77	Lowell Bailey	United States	29:02.0	3 (1+2)	+2:50.4
47	68	Tatsumi Kasahara	Japan	29:07.0	1 (0+1)	+2:55.4
48	52	Jānis Bērziņš	Latvia	29:09.9	1 (0+1)	+2:58.3
49	71	Raivis Zimelis	Latvia	29:11.4	2 (1+1)	+2:59.8
50	73	Robin Clegg	Canada	29:12.4	3 (1+2)	+3:00.8
51	69	Miroslav Matiaško	Slovakia	29:13.0	2 (1+1)	+3:01.4
52	65	Ludwig Gredler	Austria	29:17.6	4 (3+1)	+3:06.0
53	41	Carl Johan Bergman	Sweden	29:21.5	0 (0+0)	+3:09.9
54	88	Kristaps Libietis	Latvia	29:21.9	0 (0+0)	+3:10.3
55	70	Michal Šlesingr	Czech Republic	29:22.9	3 (1+2)	+3:11.3
56	5	Alexsandr Chervyhkov	Kazakhstan	29:27.1	2 (0+2)	+3:15.5
57	83	Matej Kazár	Slovakia	29:29.4	1 (0+1)	+3:17.8
58	58	Roland Lessing	Estonia	29:30.7	2 (1+1)	+3:19.1
59	9	Jean Philippe Leguellec	Canada	29:32.3	2 (1+1)	+3:20.7
60	85	Jeremy Teela	United States	29:32.7	4 (2+2)	+3:21.1
61	66	Vladimir Drachev	Belarus	29:48.3	3 (2+1)	+3:36.7
62	82	Daisuke Ebisawa	Japan	29:49.7	3 (1+2)	+3:38.1
63	62	Matjaž Poklukar	Slovenia	30:00.6	3 (1+2)	+3:49.0
64	60	Michał Piecha	Poland	30:01.6	2 (1+1)	+3:50.0
65	53	Simon Hallenbarter	Switzerland	30:05.7	5 (4+1)	+3:54.1
66	78	Sergio Bonaldi	Italy	30:06.7	3 (2+1)	+3:55.1
67	79	Grzegorz Bodziana	Poland	30:08.4	1 (0+1)	+3:56.8
68	76	Janez Ožbolt	Slovenia	30:08.8	2 (1+1)	+3:57.2
69	90	Klemen Bauer	Slovenia	30:09.3	2 (0+2)	+3:57.7
70	49	Kyoji Suga	Japan	30:10.6	2 (2+0)	+3:59.0
71	22	Marek Matiasko	Slovakia	30:11.0	6 (3+3)	+3:59.4
72	75	Vyacheslav Derkach	Ukraine	30:15.8	2 (0+2)	+4:04.2
73	67	Dimitri Borovik	Estonia	30:31.6	4 (2+2)	+4:20.0
74	26	Imre Tagscherer	Hungary	30:38.1	3 (1+2)	+4:26.5
75	84	Janno Prants	Estonia	30:41.0	2 (1+1)	+4:29.4
76	51	Marian Blaj	Romania	30:44.4	4 (4+0)	+4:32.8
77	61	Tom Clemens	Great Britain	31:05.0	4 (2+2)	+4:53.4
78	11	Jay Hakkinen	United States	31:22.2	6 (5+1)	+5:10.6
79	43	Park Yoon-bae	South Korea	31:29.5	3 (3+0)	+5:17.9
80	34	Cameron Morton	Australia	32:07.4	4 (2+2)	+5:55.8
81	18	Mihail Gribusencov	Moldova	32:17.6	2 (1+1)	+6:06.0
82	29	Luis Alberto Hernando	Spain	32:26.0	4 (1+3)	+6:14.4
83	42	Stavros Christoforidis	Greece	32:48.3	3 (1+2)	+6:36.7
84	4	Miro Ćosić	Bosnia and Herzegovina	32:56.1	4 (1+3)	+6:44.5
85	27	Aleksandar Milenković	Serbia and Montenegro	33:17.7	6 (1+5)	+7:06.1
86	30	Sebastian Beltrame	Argentina	33:32.4	5 (2+3)	+7:20.8
87	23	Marco Zuniga	Chile	33:38.1	1 (1+0)	+7:26.5
88	12	Karolis Zlatkauskas	Lithuania	34:33.8	4 (2+2)	+8:22.2
DSQ	87	Wolfgang Perner	Austria	26:51.6	1 (0+1)	+40.0
DSQ	48	Wolfgang Rottman	Austria	28:11.8	3 (1+2)	+2:00.2
