= Biathlon World Championships 2007 – Men's individual =

Men's individual at the Biathlon World Championships 2007
- Location: Antholz-Anterselva, Italy
- Date: 6 February
- Competitors: 112 from 34 nations
- Winning time: 56:14.6

Medalists
gold medal	Raphaël Poirée	France
silver medal	Michael Greis	Germany
bronze medal	Michal Šlesingr	Czech Republic

The men's individual competition at the Biathlon World Championships 2007 was held on 6 February 2007.

== Results ==
The race was started at 14:15.

Rank	Bib	Name	Nationality	Penalties (P+S+P+S)	Time	Deficit
1st place, gold medalist(s)	17	Raphaël Poirée	France	0 (0+0+0+0)	56.14.6	
2nd place, silver medalist(s)	14	Michael Greis	Germany	2 (0+1+0+1)	56.41.4	+26.8
3rd place, bronze medalist(s)	13	Michal Šlesingr	Czech Republic	2 (0+2+0+0)	56.52.0	+37.4
4	80	Frode Andresen	Norway	1 (0+1+0+0)	56.53.9	+39.3
5	11	Nikolay Kruglov	Russia	0 (0+0+0+0)	57.05.7	+51.1
6	9	Ivan Tcherezov	Russia	1 (0+1+0+0)	57.24.2	+1:09.6
7	25	Tim Burke	United States	2 (0+1+0+1)	57.42.0	+1:27.4
8	15	Simon Fourcade	France	1 (0+0+0+1)	57.48.1	+1:33.5
9	12	Ricco Groß	Germany	0 (0+0+0+0)	57.52.4	+1:37.8
10	96	Halvard Hanevold	Norway	1 (1+0+0+0)	58.16.4	+2:01.8
11	10	Christoph Sumann	Austria	1 (0+0+0+1)	58.19.5	+2:04.9
12	28	Daniel Mesotitsch	Austria	2 (1+0+0+1)	58.27.4	+2:12.8
13	8	Alexander Wolf	Germany	3 (0+1+0+2)	58.28.5	+2:13.9
14	6	Björn Ferry	Sweden	3 (0+0+0+3)	58.29.2	+2:14.6
15	7	Sergei Rozhkov	Russia	2 (0+1+1+0)	58.29.5	+2:14.9
16	63	Alexei Korobeynikov	Ukraine	2 (0+2+0+0)	58.33.1	+2:18.5
17	5	Rene Laurent Vuillermoz	Italy	3 (0+1+2+0)	58.45.8	+2:31.2
18	90	Olexander Bilanenko	Ukraine	0 (0+0+0+0)	59.12.1	+2:57.5
19	3	Andreas Birnbacher	Germany	3 (1+2+0+0)	59.21.1	+3:06.5
20	16	Sven Fischer	Germany	3 (2+0+0+1)	59.35.4	+3:20.8
21	20	Tomasz Sikora	Poland	3 (0+2+0+1)	59.42.4	+3:27.8
22	86	Loïs Habert	France	1 (0+1+0+0)	59.44.5	+3:29.9
23	55	Roland Lessing	Estonia	1 (1+0+0+0)	1:00:00.3	+3:45.7
24	46	Janis Berzins	Latvia	1 (0+0+0+1)	1:00:26.9	+4:12.3
25	76	Alexandr Syman	Belarus	3 (1+0+1+1)	1:00:29.3	+4:14.7
26	26	Christian De Lorenzi	Italy	3 (1+0+0+2)	1:00:34.6	+4:20.0
27	57	Marek Matiasko	Slovakia	1 (0+0+0+1)	1:00:36.9	+4:22.3
28	62	Mattias Nilsson	Sweden	4 (1+1+0+2)	1:00:42.8	+4:28.2
29	50	Simon Hallenbarter	Switzerland	3 (2+0+1+0)	1:00:44.4	+4:29.8
30	2	Matthias Simmen	Switzerland	5 (2+0+1+2)	1:00:57.2	+4:42.6
31	43	Jay Hakkinen	United States	3 (0+2+0+1)	1:01:02.0	+4:47.4
32	89	Ole Einar Bjørndalen	Norway	6 (3+0+2+1)	1:01:05.5	+4:50.9
33	64	Filipp Shulman	Russia	4 (1+2+0+1)	1:01:11.7	+4:57.1
34	48	Sergey Novikov	Belarus	5 (0+2+0+3)	1:01:54.0	+5:39.4
35	92	Roland Zwahlen	Switzerland	3 (0+1+1+1)	1:01:55.8	+5:41.2
36	69	Janez Marič	Slovenia	5 (1+0+1+3)	1:02:01.9	+5:47.3
37	47	Miroslav Matiaško	Slovakia	2 (0+2+0+0)	1:02:12.2	+5:57.6
38	77	Pavol Hurajt	Slovakia	2 (1+0+0+1)	1:02:13.7	+5:59.1
39	1	Carl Johan Bergman	Sweden	4 (1+0+1+2)	1:02:28.3	+6:13.7
40	87	Jean-Philippe Le Guellec	Canada	3 (2+1+0+0)	1:02:33.8	+6:19.2
41	114	Lowell Bailey	United States	3 (1+0+1+1)	1:02:34.2	+6:19.6
42	112	Serguei Sednev	Ukraine	3 (0+1+1+1)	1:02:36.6	+6:22.0
43	100	Tomáš Holubec	Czech Republic	3 (0+1+1+1)	1:02:39.4	+6:24.8
44	32	Alexei Aidarov	Ukraine	5 (0+2+0+3)	1:02:40.6	+6:26.0
45	67	Jeremy Teela	United States	4 (1+1+0+2)	1:02:40.6	+6:26.0
46	45	Wilfried Pallhuber	Italy	4 (2+1+1+0)	1:02:46.0	+6:31.4
47	30	Indrek Tobreluts	Estonia	5 (1+0+1+3)	1:02:50.9	+6:36.3
48	21	Rustam Valiullin	Belarus	6 (3+1+1+1)	1:02:53.4	+6:38.8
49	70	Lars Berger	Norway	5 (1+1+2+1)	1:03:09.7	+6:55.1
50	22	Jouni Kinnunen	Finland	1 (1+0+0+0)	1:03:18.4	+7:03.8
51	38	Julien Robert	France	2 (0+0+0+2)	1:03:22.9	+7:08.3
52	65	David Ekholm	Sweden	4 (2+0+2+0)	1:03:26.3	+7:11.7
53	78	Jaroslav Soukup	Czech Republic	7 (2+2+1+2)	1:03:30.9	+7:16.3
54	51	Zdeněk Vítek	Czech Republic	6 (1+2+1+2)	1:03:32.3	+7:17.7
55	105	Sergey Dashkevich	Belarus	2 (0+0+0+2)	1:03:40.3	+7:25.7
56	61	Zhang Qing	China	4 (0+0+1+3)	1:03:45.9	+7:31.3
57	85	Markus Windisch	Italy	5 (1+2+1+1)	1:03:49.2	+7:34.6
58	107	Claudio Bockli	Switzerland	5 (1+1+1+2)	1:03:50.0	+7:35.4
59	4	Friedrich Pinter	Austria	5 (1+2+1+1)	1:03:57.9	+7:43.3
60	99	David Leoni	Canada	4 (1+1+1+1)	1:04:07.0	+7:52.4
61	29	Krzysztof Pływaczyk	Poland	3 (2+1+0+0)	1:04:12.1	+7:57.5
62	36	Robin Clegg	Canada	3 (0+2+0+1)	1:04:17.8	+8:03.2
63	111	Vladimir Iliev	Bulgaria	3 (1+0+0+2)	1:04:21.0	+8:06.4
64	24	Timo Antila	Finland	4 (1+2+1+0)	1:04:21.4	+8:06.8
65	27	Zhang Chengye	China	7 (0+4+1+2)	1:04:39.9	+8:25.3
66	84	Wieslaw Ziemianin	Poland	1 (0+0+0+1)	1:04:40.9	+8:26.3
67	91	Jarkko Kauppinen	Finland	1 (1+0+0+0)	1:04:41.9	+8:27.3
68	74	Simon Eder	Austria	4 (1+0+1+2)	1:04:52.9	+8:38.3
69	72	Priit Viks	Estonia	5 (0+1+3+1)	1:04:55.1	+8:40.5
70	60	Vitaliy Rudenchyk	Bulgaria	5 (1+2+0+2)	1:05:01.2	+8:46.6
71	79	Kristaps Libietis	Latvia	2 (0+1+1+0)	1:05:23.4	+9:08.8
72	58	Alexsandr Chervyhkov	Kazakhstan	4 (0+3+1+0)	1:05:35.8	+9:21.2
73	98	Dušan Šimočko	Slovakia	4 (1+0+1+2)	1:05:38.7	+9:24.1
74	34	Jaime Robb	Canada	6 (1+1+0+4)	1:05:39.0	+9:24.4
75	59	Lee-Steve Jackson	Great Britain	2 (1+0+0+1)	1:05:56.8	+9:42.2
76	97	Mirosław Kobus	Poland	4 (2+1+0+1)	1:06:03.2	+9:48.6
77	23	Mark Raymond	Australia	5 (1+2+1+1)	1:06:11.3	+9:56.7
78	52	Gregor Brvar	Slovenia	5 (0+3+1+1)	1:06:22.6	+10:08.0
79	82	Klemen Bauer	Slovenia	7 (2+2+0+3)	1:06:23.9	+10:09.3
80	81	Michail Kletcherov	Bulgaria	3 (0+0+2+1)	1:06:35.5	+10:20.9
81	71	Sebastian Beltrame	Argentina	4 (1+1+1+1)	1:06:37.5	+10:22.9
82	103	Ren Long	China	6 (1+2+1+2)	1:06:47.7	+10:33.1
83	106	Yan Savitskiy	Kazakhstan	4 (1+0+2+1)	1:06:48.1	+10:33.5
84	75	Athanassios Tsakiris	Greece	4 (0+2+0+2)	1:06:55.4	+10:40.8
85	35	Edgars Piksons	Latvia	7 (1+3+1+2)	1:07:25.7	+11:11.1
86	42	Lee In-bok	South Korea	3 (0+1+0+2)	1:07:35.6	+11:21.0
87	19	Hidenori Isa	Japan	5 (0+1+2+2)	1:07:55.3	+11:40.7
88	54	Martin Møller	Greenland	7 (1+3+1+2)	1:08:31.5	+12:16.9
89	108	Danilo Kodela	Slovenia	6 (1+2+1+2)	1:09:02.5	+12:47.9
90	83	Shinya Saito	Japan	8 (2+3+1+2)	1:09:27.3	+13:12.7
91	37	Jose Damian Barcos	Argentina	1 (0+0+0+1)	1:09:48.0	+13:33.4
92	68	Alexandr Trifonov	Kazakhstan	8 (1+1+2+4)	1:09:52.2	+13:37.6
93	27	Jakov Fak	Croatia	8 (1+2+1+4)	1:09:55.2	+13:40.6
94	33	Alari Remmelg	Estonia	7 (2+2+1+2)	1:10:07.7	+13:53.1
95	102	Tian Ye	China	7 (1+2+3+1)	1:10:19.5	+14:04.9
96	88	Lance Hodgkins	Great Britain	4 (0+1+1+2)	1:10:31.3	+14:16.7
97	40	Joe Brooks	Great Britain	2 (1+0+0+1)	1:10:45.5	+14:30.9
98	109	Kevin Kane	Great Britain	4 (0+0+2+2)	1:10:46.4	+14:31.8
99	94	Mika Kaljunen	Finland	6 (1+1+2+2)	1:10:59.0	+14:44.4
100	113	Sergey Naumik	Kazakhstan	10 (3+1+1+5)	1:11:14.4	+14:59.8
101	18	Gints Rozenbergs	Latvia	7 (1+3+1+2)	1:11:29.3	+15:14.7
102	101	Thorsten Langer	Belgium	5 (1+1+2+1)	1:11:31.0	+15:16.4
103	53	Stavros Christoforidis	Greece	5 (1+1+2+1)	1:11:52.9	+15:38.3
104	41	Oystein Slettemark	Greenland	10 (2+4+2+2)	1:12:04.7	+15:50.1
105	93	Pascal Langer	Belgium	5 (0+3+0+2)	1:12:43.1	+16:28.5
106	73	Bojan Samardžija	Bosnia and Herzegovina	8 (3+2+1+2)	1:13:05.8	+16:51.2
107	44	Imre Tagscherer	Hungary	8 (2+1+1+4)	1:13:16.4	+17:01.8
108	56	Zoltán Tagscherer	Hungary	8 (4+1+1+2)	1:13:29.3	+17:14.7
109	31	Aleksandar Milenković	Serbia	10 (1+3+4+2)	1:14:12.5	+17:57.9
110	49	Csaba Cseke	Hungary	8 (3+1+1+3)	1:14:31.3	+18:16.7
111	95	Károly Gombos	Hungary	9 (1+4+2+2)	1:17:00.1	+20:45.5
	104	Kiril Vasilev	Bulgaria	(0+0+1)	Did not finish	
	66	Damir Rastić	Serbia	Did not start		
	110	Vincent Naveau	Belgium	Did not start		
