= Biathlon World Championships 2007 – Men's sprint =

Men's sprint at the Biathlon World Championships 2007
- Location: Antholz-Anterselva, Italy
- Date: 3 February
- Competitors: 104 from 31 nations
- Winning time: 26:18.8

Medalists
gold medal	Ole Einar Bjørndalen	Norway
silver medal	Michal Šlesingr	Czech Republic
bronze medal	Andriy Deryzemlya	Ukraine

The men's sprint competition at the Biathlon World Championships 2007 was held on 3 February 2007.

== Info ==
Ole Einar Bjørndalen took his thirteenth World Championships gold medal (including the five Olympic golds), though missing the very final shot threatened to lose him his title. However, most of the other early starters also missed shots, and after the first group of 24 top-placed skiers had finished, no one were within half a minute of Bjørndalen. Of the remaining skiers, only Michal Šlesingr and Maxim Tchoudov had placings among the top 30 in the overall World Cup ranking; Šlesingr completed a faultless shooting but was still six seconds behind from the range, and despite a fine finish he could not catch Bjørndalen, while Tchoudov's medal chances went as he missed twice in the standing shoot, also spending too much time at the range. However, Andriy Deryzemlya of Ukraine, who had not placed on a World Cup podium for two seasons, was ranked 34th in the overall World Cup, and who had not placed in the top six of sprint races for the last four seasons, used two perfect shootings to beat World Cup number three Björn Ferry by ten seconds.

Neither Russia nor Germany managed to get anyone in the top ten; the best German was Alexander Wolf in 15th with three misses, with Birnbacher, World Cup leader Greis, and Michael Rösch also missing more than two times. Nikolay Kruglov, Jr., the winner of the Oberhof sprint race, placed 12th after slow skiing, but was still the best Russian, one place ahead of Tchoudov.

== Results ==
The race was started at 10:45.

Rank	Bib	Name	Nationality	Penalties (P+S)	Time	Deficit
1st place, gold medalist(s)	22	Ole Einar Bjørndalen	Norway	1 (0+1)	26:18.8	
2nd place, silver medalist(s)	38	Michal Šlesingr	Czech Republic	0 (0+0)	26:23.6	+4.8
3rd place, bronze medalist(s)	40	Andriy Deryzemlya	Ukraine	0 (0+0)	26:44.6	+25.8
4	3	Björn Ferry	Sweden	1 (0+1)	26:53.2	+34.4
5	21	Tomasz Sikora	Poland	1 (1+0)	26:58.0	+39.2
6	52	Mattias Nilsson	Sweden	0 (0+0)	26:59.2	+40.4
7	8	Emil Hegle Svendsen	Norway	2 (1+1)	27:06.8	+48.0
8	17	Raphaël Poirée	France	1 (0+1)	27:08.9	+50.1
9	7	Rene Laurent Vuillermoz	Italy	2 (1+1)	27:12.5	+53.7
10	13	Matthias Simmen	Switzerland	3 (2+1)	27:15.3	+56.5
11	2	Christian De Lorenzi	Italy	1 (0+1)	27:15.6	+56.8
12	16	Nikolay Kruglov	Russia	1 (1+0)	27:17.4	+58.6
13	50	Maxim Tchoudov	Russia	2 (0+2)	27:21.6	+1:02.8
14	5	Lars Berger	Norway	4 (1+3)	27:22.8	+1:04.0
15	12	Alexander Wolf	Germany	3 (1+2)	27:28.8	+1:10.0
16	14	Vincent Defrasne	France	2 (1+1)	27:29.9	+1:11.1
17	4	Andreas Birnbacher	Germany	2 (1+1)	27:31.8	+1:13.0
18	9	Michael Rösch	Germany	3 (2+1)	27:37.2	+1:18.4
19	19	Michael Greis	Germany	3 (1+2)	27:37.8	+1:19.0
20	25	Indrek Tobreluts	Estonia	2 (1+1)	27:40.4	+1:21.6
21	56	Olexander Bilanenko	Ukraine	1 (0+1)	27:48.4	+1:29.6
22	23	Ivan Tcherezov	Russia	2 (1+1)	27:53.4	+1:34.6
23	15	Halvard Hanevold	Norway	3 (3+0)	27:53.7	+1:34.9
24	34	Wilfried Pallhuber	Italy	1 (1+0)	27:54.1	+1:35.3
25	35	Janez Maric	Slovenia	4 (0+4)	27:55.0	+1:36.2
26	37	Daniel Mesotitsch	Austria	2 (1+1)	27:56.4	+1:37.6
27	18	Dmitri Yaroshenko	Russia	2 (0+2)	27:56.7	+1:37.9
28	11	Friedrich Pinter	Austria	1 (0+1)	27:57.6	+1:38.8
29	94	Alexei Aidarov	Ukraine	1 (0+1)	27:58.5	+1:39.7
30	20	Christoph Sumann	Austria	2 (0+2)	28:01.7	+1:42.9
31	29	Klemen Bauer	Slovenia	2 (0+2)	28:02.7	+1:43.9
32	93	Jaroslav Soukup	Czech Republic	1 (1+0)	28:03.7	+1:44.9
33	73	Magnús Jónsson	Sweden	2 (0+2)	28:06.3	+1:47.5
34	10	Carl Johan Bergman	Sweden	4 (2+2)	28:06.4	+1:47.6
35	1	Tim Burke	United States	4 (1+3)	28:16.6	+1:57.8
36	84	Alexei Korobeynikov	Ukraine	3 (1+2)	28:20.9	+2:02.1
37	24	Simon Fourcade	France	2 (2+0)	28:26.5	+2:07.7
38	103	Jay Hakkinen	United States	3 (2+1)	28:29.4	+2:10.6
39	43	Sergei Novikov	Belarus	2 (0+2)	28:30.0	+2:11.2
40	26	Rustam Valiullin	Belarus	4 (0+4)	28:35.4	+2:16.6
41	85	Wiesław Ziemianin	Poland	0 (0+0)	28:37.3	+2:18.5
42	47	Roland Lessing	Estonia	3 (2+1)	28:39.5	+2:20.7
43	6	Sven Fischer	Germany	3 (2+1)	28:40.5	+2:21.7
44	67	Ludwig Gredler	Austria	2 (1+1)	28:42.6	+2:23.8
45	90	Vasja Rupnik	Slovenia	2 (1+1)	28:42.8	+2:24.0
46	36	Jeremy Teela	United States	4 (2+2)	28:50.4	+2:31.6
47	80	Markus Windisch	Italy	3 (2+1)	28:52.1	+2:33.3
48	69	Lowell Bailey	United States	4 (2+2)	29:04.1	+2:45.3
49	82	Jouni Kinnunen	Finland	1 (1+0)	29:07.9	+2:49.1
50	30	Roman Dostál	Czech Republic	4 (0+4)	29:08.0	+2:49.2
51	60	Timo Antila	Finland	2 (1+1)	29:15.5	+2:56.7
52	63	Simon Hallenbarter	Switzerland	4 (1+3)	29:16.8	+2:58.0
53	104	Jaime Robb	Canada	4 (2+2)	29:24.0	+3:05.2
54	72	Gregor Brvar	Slovenia	2 (2+0)	29:27.1	+3:08.3
55	91	Mirosław Kobus	Poland	1 (0+1)	29:30.4	+3:11.6
56	83	Ondřej Moravec	Czech Republic	3 (1+2)	29:35.4	+3:16.6
57	41	Jarkko Kauppinen	Finland	2 (1+1)	29:37.8	+3:19.0
59	75	Alexandr Syman	Belarus	4 (2+2)	29:38.9	+3:20.1
59	61	Ferreol Cannard	France	4 (2+2)	29:41.7	+3:22.9
60	32	Robin Clegg	Canada	3 (2+1)	29:43.3	+3:24.5
61	59	Ji Delin	China	2 (0+2)	29:45.0	+3:26.2
62	39	Krzysztof Plywaczyk	Poland	4 (2+2)	29:52.4	+3:33.6
63	88	Roland Zwahlen	Switzerland	4 (2+2)	29:58.5	+3:39.7
64	86	Jean-Philippe Le Guellec	Canada	5 (2+3)	30:01.2	+3:42.4
65	68	Priit Viks	Estonia	2 (2+0)	30:03.3	+3:44.5
66	44	David Leoni	Canada	5 (2+3)	30:06.3	+3:47.5
67	105	Claudio Böckli	Switzerland	4 (3+1)	30:09.7	+3:50.9
68	74	Kiril Vasilev	Bulgaria	1 (1+0)	30:12.1	+3:53.3
69	66	Jānis Bērziņš	Latvia	3 (2+1)	30:14.2	+3:55.4
70	48	Vitaliy Rudenchyk	Bulgaria	2 (1+1)	30:14.6	+3:55.8
71	57	Marek Matiaško	Slovakia	4 (2+2)	30:16.5	+3:57.7
72	97	Kaspars Dumbris	Latvia	3 (0+3)	30:17.8	+3:59.0
73	101	Dušan Šimočko	Slovakia	2 (1+1)	30:20.1	+4:01.3
74	27	Edgars Piksons	Latvia	4 (0+4)	30:21.9	+4:03.1
75	58	Lee-Steve Jackson	Great Britain	1 (0+1)	30:25.9	+4:07.1
76	102	Vladimir Miklashevsky	Belarus	3 (1+2)	30:33.1	+4:14.3
77	77	Oystein Slettemark	Greenland	4 (1+3)	30:48.8	+4:30.0
78	64	Jakov Fak	Croatia	4 (4+0)	30:49.2	+4:30.4
79	99	Mika Kaljunen	Finland	3 (3+0)	30:51.3	+4:32.5
80	42	Zoltán Tagscherer	Hungary	3 (1+2)	30:56.2	+4:37.4
81	100	Kauri Koiv	Estonia	7 (5+2)	31:13.4	+4:54.6
82	46	Miroslav Matiaško	Slovakia	7 (2+5)	31:38.0	+5:19.2
83	78	Pavol Hurajt	Slovakia	6 (5+1)	31:49.2	+5:30.4
84	70	Zhang Long	China	4 (3+1)	31:53.4	+5:34.6
85	31	Sebastian Beltrame	Argentina	3 (2+1)	31:55.5	+5:36.7
86	95	Vladimir Iliev	Bulgaria	5 (2+3)	32:04.6	+5:45.8
87	53	Mark Raymond	Australia	4 (2+2)	32:13.4	+5:54.6
88	49	Imre Tagscherer	Hungary	5 (2+3)	32:24.8	+6:06.0
89	54	Stavros Christoforidis	Greece	1 (0+1)	32:59.7	+6:40.9
90	51	Martin Møller	Greenland	5 (1+4)	33:02.1	+6:43.3
91	79	Damir Rastić	Serbia	6 (3+3)	33:11.7	+6:52.9
92	33	Aleksandar Milenković	Serbia	7 (3+4)	33:14.4	+6:55.6
93	98	Lance Hodgkins	Great Britain	3 (1+2)	33:21.2	+7:02.4
94	92	Thorsten Langer	Belgium	2 (1+1)	33:29.6	+7:10.8
95	62	Kevin Kane	Great Britain	4 (2+2)	33:33.6	+7:14.8
96	28	Michail Kletcherov	Bulgaria	2 (2+0)	33:40.6	+7:21.8
97	65	Vincent Naveau	Belgium	3 (1+2)	33:54.1	+7:35.3
98	87	José Damián Barcos	Argentina	1 (0+1)	33:59.3	+7:40.5
99	96	Csaba Cseke	Hungary	6 (3+3)	34:01.1	+7:42.3
100	81	Károly Gombos	Hungary	6 (2+4)	34:08.7	+7:49.9
101	71	Joe Brooks	Great Britain	5 (3+2)	34:13.9	+7:55.1
102	55	Bojan Samardžija	Bosnia and Herzegovina	7 (3+4)	34:59.8	+8:41.0
103	89	Pascal Langer	Belgium	7 (5+2)	35:09.0	+8:50.2
	76	Athanassios Tsakiris	Greece	4 (3+1)	Did not finish	
	45	Ilmārs Bricis	Latvia	Did not start		
