= Biathlon at the 2006 Winter Olympics – Men's individual =

Men's biathlon individual at the XX Olympic Winter Games
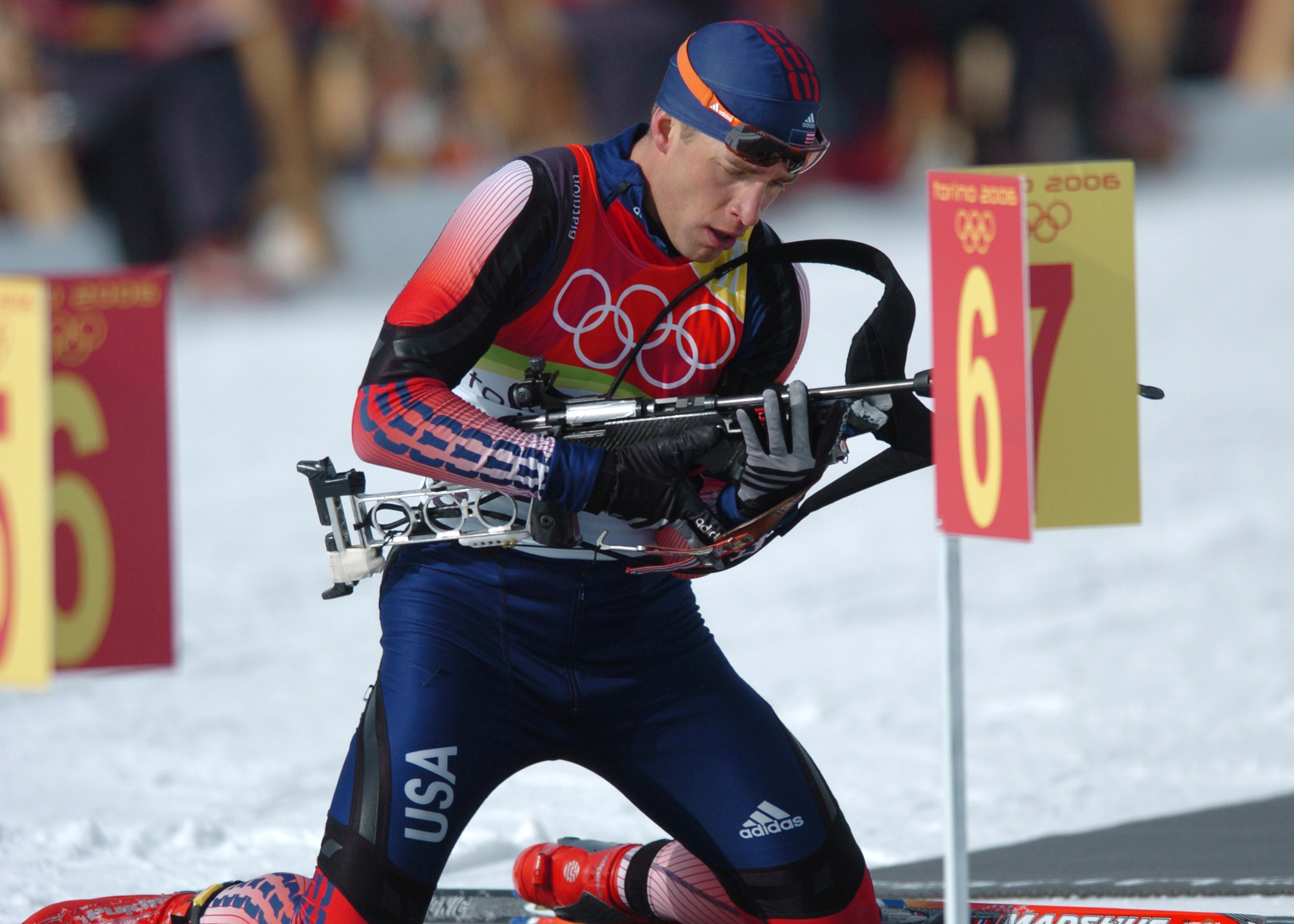
- Men's biathlon 20 km individual final
- Venue: Cesana San Sicario
- Dates: 11 February 2006
- Competitors: 88 from 34 nations
- Winning time: 54:23.0

Medalists
1st place, gold medalist(s)		Michael Greis	Germany
2nd place, silver medalist(s)		Ole Einar Bjørndalen	Norway
3rd place, bronze medalist(s)		Halvard Hanevold	Norway

The Men's 20 kilometre individual biathlon competition at the 2006 Winter Olympics in Turin, Italy was held on 11 February, at Cesana San Sicario.

The individual race consisted of five laps around a four kilometre loop with four stops at the shooting range. During each shooting section, each biathlete fired five shots at five targets. Misses resulted in penalties of one minute per miss being added to the time for the course. The first and third shooting sections were conducted in the prone position, while the second and fourth were done standing. A total of 88 biathletes competed, starting with a staggered start and 30 seconds behind each competitor.

Michael Greis of Germany hit 19 of the 20 targets and used a net time of 54:23.0 (with one penalty minute) to clinch the gold medal, 16 seconds ahead of Norway's Ole Einar Bjørndalen. Norway also won the bronze medal, with Halvard Hanevold beating Sergei Tchepikov by 0.8 seconds despite two penalty minutes to the Russian's one.

The previous year's trial World Cup event at this track saw Michael Greis of Germany win the event in a time of 53:18.7. At the 2005 World Championships in Hochfilzen, Austria, the Czech Roman Dostál won, while Ole Einar Bjørndalen was the defending Olympic champion, as he was in all the other men's events (except the mass start, which is held for the first time at the Olympics). However, neither Bjørndalen (9th) nor Dostal (33rd) headed the men's individual World Cup standings—the German Michael Greis did.

The event started with early starters Ricco Groß (Germany, started as number 4) and Pavel Rostovtsev (Russia, 1) shooting well, missing one and two of their 20 shots respectively; Groß suffered his missed shot on the last of the four shootings. However, their cross-country times were not good enough, as Rene Vuillermoz (Italy, 13) beat Groß by 14 seconds on the first loop. With only one miss in his first 15 shots, Vuillermoz could have taken the lead if he had hit all five targets on the final shooting. However, he missed three times and eventually finished 25th. Maxim Tchoudov (Russia, 14) led after two loops, 28 seconds ahead of Groß, but had spoiled his chance with three missed shots. By that time, many of the best skiers had started, with Greis (38) coming into the third shooting after one miss on the second. He hit five targets, and went out in the second best time, 12 seconds behind Marek Matiasko (Slovakia, 21), who was yet to miss a shot. Meanwhile, the defending champion Bjørndalen (54) had missed once on each of the first two shootings, and when all had passed the second loop he was 15th.

However, Bjørndalen completed the third loop quickly, and with five hits he cut Greis' lead from 39 to 23 seconds just before Greis was to shoot his fourth shooting. Greis did not miss, and with the leader Matiasko conceding one penalty minute, Greis took the lead nearly a minute ahead of second-placed Julien Robert (France, 35), who had not missed a single shot. Some other late starters visited the top ten after the first loops, such as Sven Fischer (Germany, 63) and Zdeněk Vítek (Czech Republic, 67) but vanished, and there were only four others who could beat Greis' skiing speed. Except for Bjørndalen, all of the previous had started before him, but missed too many shots to compete; however, Bjørndalen had caught 37 seconds on the first 12 km, and needed a further 23. Thus, Bjørndalen was the only threat, and though Bjørndalen hit all five targets on the final shooting, he struggled with loading the rifle before the final shot. He later said he lost "7-8 seconds" on the error. Thus, Bjørndalen did not beat the German in the fourth loop, and though he cut a further seven seconds off Greis' time in the final loop, it was only enough to take the silver. The late starting Halvard Hanevold (Norway, 74), shot down the last 10 targets to jump from 28th place after two loops to a fourth place after the fourth, with third-placed Robert eight seconds ahead with two penalty minutes less. Hanevold had no problems with catching Robert on the final lap, ending nearly half a minute ahead, but lost seconds to Sergei Tchepikov (Russia, 28), who improved all the way through the course. Eventually, his 6.3-second lead after the fourth loop turned into 0.8 seconds in goal; it was enough, though, and Hanevold could celebrate his second Olympic medal on the individual event. Jay Hakkinen become the first American to finish in the Top 10 ever in the Winter Olympic biathlon with his 10th-place finish.

== Results ==
One Austrian athlete was disqualified after the IOC determined they had violated the Anti-Doping rules; Wolfgang Perner had originally placed 60th.

The race was held at 13:00.

Rank	Bib	Name	Country	Result	Penalties (P+S+P+S)	Deficit
1st place, gold medalist(s)	38	Michael Greis	Germany	54:23.0	1 (0+1+0+0)	—
2nd place, silver medalist(s)	57	Ole Einar Bjørndalen	Norway	54:39.0	2 (1+1+0+0)	+16.0
3rd place, bronze medalist(s)	74	Halvard Hanevold	Norway	55:31.9	2 (1+1+0+0)	+1:08.9
4	28	Sergei Tchepikov	Russia	55:32.7	1 (1+0+0+0)	+1:09.7
5	21	Marek Matiaško	Slovakia	55:48.6	1 (0+0+0+1)	+1:25.6
6	35	Julien Robert	France	55:59.4	0 (0+0+0+0)	+1:36.4
7	54	Christian De Lorenzi	Italy	56:04.0	1 (0+0+0+1)	+1:41.0
8	22	Ivan Tcherezov	Russia	56:05.7	2 (1+0+0+1)	+1:42.7
9	66	Wilfried Pallhuber	Italy	56:08.4	1 (1+0+0+0)	+1:45.4
10	31	Jay Hakkinen	United States	56:10.9	3 (2+0+1+0)	+1:47.9
11	4	Ricco Groß	Germany	56:14.3	1 (0+0+0+1)	+1:51.3
12	8	Paavo Puurunen	Finland	56:38.9	1 (1+0+0+0)	+2:15.9
13	1	Pavel Rostovtsev	Russia	56:47.2	2 (1+0+0+1)	+2:24.2
14	52	Kyoji Suga	Japan	56:57.7	1 (1+0+0+0)	+2:34.7
15	48	Frode Andresen	Norway	57:10.2	3 (1+1+1+0)	+2:47.2
16	64	Stian Eckhoff	Norway	57:11.8	3 (2+0+0+1)	+2:48.8
17	63	Sven Fischer	Germany	57:14.3	3 (1+0+1+1)	+2:51.3
18	61	Ruslan Lysenko	Ukraine	57:16.6	1 (0+1+0+0)	+2:53.6
19	15	Ilmārs Bricis	Latvia	57:19.2	4 (1+1+0+2)	+2:56.2
20	9	Raphaël Poirée	France	57:21.1	3 (2+0+1+0)	+2:58.1
21	19	Tomasz Sikora	Poland	57:22.1	3 (1+1+1+0)	+2:59.1
22	67	Zdeněk Vítek	Czech Republic	57:26.8	3 (0+1+1+1)	+3:03.8
23	5	Carl Johan Bergman	Sweden	57:30.9	3 (1+1+0+1)	+3:07.9
24	6	Sergey Novikov	Belarus	58:02.6	3 (0+1+0+2)	+3:39.6
25	13	Rene Laurent Vuillermoz	Italy	58:17.9	4 (0+1+0+3)	+3:54.9
26	70	Friedrich Pinter	Austria	58:25.7	1 (0+0+0+1)	+4:02.7
27	79	Lowell Bailey	United States	58:45.1	3 (2+1+0+0)	+4:22.1
28	58	Björn Ferry	Sweden	58:49.0	4 (1+2+0+1)	+4:26.0
29	56	Pavol Hurajt	Slovakia	58:49.6	3 (0+1+0+2)	+4:26.6
30	59	Roman Dostál	Czech Republic	58:53.5	4 (1+2+0+1)	+4:30.5
31	43	Simon Fourcade	France	59:01.7	3 (1+0+0+2)	+4:38.7
32	14	Maxim Tchoudov	Russia	59:12.0	5 (0+0+3+2)	+4:49.0
33	81	Tomáš Holubec	Czech Republic	59:13.1	2 (1+1+0+0)	+4:50.1
34	2	Vincent Defrasne	France	59:16.1	6 (3+1+0+2)	+4:53.1
35	83	David Ekholm	Sweden	59:18.2	2 (0+1+0+1)	+4:55.2
36	3	Robin Clegg	Canada	59:21.5	2 (1+0+0+1)	+4:58.5
37	55	Jānis Bērziņš	Latvia	59:24.3	2 (0+2+0+0)	+5:01.3
38	89	Miroslav Matiaško	Slovakia	59:43.8	3 (3+0+0+0)	+5:20.8
39	47	Andriy Deryzemlya	Ukraine	59:47.2	3 (3+0+0+0)	+5:24.2
40	33	Janez Marič	Slovenia	59:53.0	5 (2+2+1+0)	+5:30.0
41	20	Ludwig Gredler	Austria	59:55.1	3 (0+3+0+0)	+5:32.1
42	41	Michael Rösch	Germany	59:56.6	6 (2+0+1+3)	+5:33.6
43	46	Vladimir Drachev	Belarus	59:59.5	4 (1+1+0+2)	+5:36.5
44	68	Mattias Nilsson Jr.	Sweden	1:00:01.1	5 (0+2+3+0)	+5:38.1
45	18	Michal Šlesingr	Czech Republic	1:00:03.8	5 (1+0+2+2)	+5:40.8
46	86	Rustam Valiullin	Belarus	1:00:04.1	5 (2+1+0+2)	+5:41.1
47	51	Matjaž Poklukar	Slovenia	1:00:07.6	3 (0+1+1+1)	+5:44.6
48	77	Jean Philippe Leguellec	Canada	1:00:28.0	3 (1+0+0+2)	+6:05.0
49	32	Olexander Bilanenko	Ukraine	1:00:28.6	3 (2+1+0+0)	+6:05.6
50	24	Zhang Chengye	China	1:00:49.1	7 (1+4+1+1)	+6:26.1
51	73	Jeremy Teela	United States	1:01:03.3	5 (1+0+1+3)	+6:40.3
52	44	Matthias Simmen	Switzerland	1:01:04.9	5 (2+0+0+3)	+6:41.9
53	23	Wiesław Ziemianin	Poland	1:01:16.0	4 (2+0+1+1)	+6:53.0
54	82	Oleksiy Korobeinikov	Ukraine	1:01:17.8	4 (0+2+1+1)	+6:54.8
55	87	Paolo Longo	Italy	1:01:27.9	5 (0+2+1+2)	+7:04.9
56	76	Dušan Šimočko	Slovakia	1:01:37.8	4 (1+0+2+1)	+7:14.8
57	49	Tom Clemens	Great Britain	1:01:43.9	4 (0+1+1+2)	+7:20.9
58	42	Tim Burke	United States	1:01:55.0	7 (3+3+1+0)	+7:32.0
59	60	Daniel Mesotitsch	Austria	1:01:59.7	5 (1+3+0+1)	+7:36.7
60	80	Klemen Bauer	Slovenia	1:02:25.5	5 (0+1+3+1)	+8:02.5
61	25	Vitaly Rudenchik	Bulgaria	1:02:30.0	6 (0+3+1+2)	+8:07.0
62	45	Roland Lessing	Estonia	1:02:31.2	5 (3+0+1+1)	+8:08.2
63	7	Hidenori Isa	Japan	1:02:33.2	6 (1+1+2+2)	+8:10.2
64	50	David Leoni	Canada	1:02:37.8	6 (0+2+3+1)	+8:14.8
65	16	Marian Blaj	Romania	1:02:38.8	6 (0+3+2+1)	+8:15.8
66	75	Indrek Tobreluts	Estonia	1:02:43.6	5 (1+2+1+1)	+8:20.6
67	65	Tatsumi Kasahara	Japan	1:02:44.6	5 (2+1+0+2)	+8:21.6
68	84	Kristaps Lībietis	Latvia	1:03:13.4	4 (2+1+1+0)	+8:50.4
69	71	Janez Ožbolt	Slovenia	1:03:18.5	5 (2+2+0+1)	+8:55.5
70	10	Dimitri Borovik	Estonia	1:03:25.8	5 (2+1+2+0)	+9:02.8
71	72	Alexandre Syman	Belarus	1:03:31.4	7 (2+3+1+1)	+9:08.4
72	62	Grzegorz Bodziana	Poland	1:03:39.6	5 (0+2+1+2)	+9:16.6
73	11	Alexsandr Chervyhkov	Kazakhstan	1:03:56.4	6 (1+3+1+1)	+9:33.4
74	88	Priit Viks	Estonia	1:04:08.1	5 (2+2+0+1)	+9:45.1
75	53	Krzysztof Pływaczyk	Poland	1:04:12.9	4 (1+0+2+1)	+9:49.9
76	37	Simon Hallenbarter	Switzerland	1:04:37.0	8 (3+1+1+3)	+10:14.0
77	34	Imre Tagscherer	Hungary	1:05:11.1	7 (1+3+1+2)	+10:48.1
78	85	Shinya Saito	Japan	1:05:29.4	8 (2+2+3+1)	+11:06.4
79	69	Edgars Piksons	Latvia	1:06:12.5	7 (4+1+1+1)	+11:49.5
80	12	Luis Alberto Hernando	Spain	1:06:54.4	7 (2+2+0+3)	+12:31.4
81	39	Park Yun-bae	South Korea	1:07:03.4	6 (0+3+2+1)	+12:40.4
82	36	Cameron Morton	Australia	1:07:03.7	7 (1+2+1+3)	+12:40.7
83	30	Miro Ćosić	Bosnia and Herzegovina	1:08:32.7	7 (1+3+1+2)	+14:09.7
84	17	Sebastian Beltrame	Argentina	1:09:24.3	9 (1+2+4+2)	+15:01.3
85	27	Aleksandar Milenković	Serbia and Montenegro	1:10:36.3	9 (1+3+1+4)	+16:13.3
86	29	Marco Zúñiga	Chile	1:11:02.5	5 (1+1+1+2)	+16:39.5
87	40	Stavros Christoforidis	Greece	1:13:13.3	11 (4+2+1+4)	+18:50.3
	26	Mihail Gribusencov	Moldova	Did not start		
DSQ	78	Wolfgang Perner	Austria	1:02:22.5	5 (1+2+1+1)	+7:59.5
