= Biathlon World Championships 2007 – Men's pursuit =

Men's pursuit at the Biathlon World Championships 2007
- Location: Antholz-Anterselva, Italy
- Date: 4 February
- Competitors: 58 from 17 nations
- Winning time: 32:21.2

Medalists
gold medal	Ole Einar Bjørndalen	Norway
silver medal	Maxim Tchoudov	Russia
bronze medal	Vincent Defrasne	France

The men's pursuit competition at the Biathlon World Championships 2007 was held on 4 February 2007.

== Info ==
Ole Einar Bjørndalen won his second gold medal in as many days, started in front, but Michal Šlesingr caught up with his four-second deficit before the first shooting, and Šlesingr completed a faultless shoot to take a 15-second lead. Deryzemlya and Björn Ferry missed, so no one else were within fifty seconds of the lead, with a group of three including Tomasz Sikora, Mattias Nilsson and Lars Berger (who advanced 13 places from his starting position through the fastest skiing).

Bjørndalen cut the deficit to Šlesingr by half during the second loop, but Šlesingr held onto his lead thanks to a faultless shoot. Berger and Sikora entered the range fighting for third place, with Emil Hegle Svendsen and Nikolay Kruglov, Jr. close behind, and Sikora, Svendsen and Kruglov (after a slow shooting) filled all their targets to leave within a few seconds of each other.

Bjørndalen and Šlesingr came in together to the first standing shooting, about half a minute ahead of the competitors. The leaders missed a few shots, with Bjørndalen getting one penalty loop and Šlesingr two, and Šlesingr thus lost half a minute and was just ahead of Sikora, who also missed once. Svendsen missed twice and was fourth, over a minute behind, and heading a group also consisting of Lars Berger, Vincent Defrasne and Raphaël Poirée.

Bjørndalen's half-a-minute lead grew to 45 seconds by the time he arrived at the shooting range for the final shoot. With a perfect shooting, he had a massive lead into the final 2.5-kilometre loop, and the fight was for the silver medal. Sikora missed twice, while Šlesingr lost many seconds in shooting speed and also missed a target. In the group behind, Berger had taken a lead before the shooting, but missed three shots, and Svendsen and Poirée also missed to leave Defrasne with a lead of 13 seconds on Šlesingr, but over a minute up to Bjørndalen. Maxim Tchoudov, who had not been better than 14th at any stage, now shot a full house and left the range in a group with Svendsen, Poirée and Sikora.

There were no errors for Bjørndalen, who could ski the final loop as a lap of honour and still win by a minute, while Tchoudov distanced all his competitors in the chase for medals. Svendsen and Poirée were dropped, he caught and left Šlesingr, before pipping Olympic gold medallist Defrasne to the line and taking silver.

== Results ==
The race was started at 11:15.

Rank	Bib	Name	Nationality	Start	Penalties (P+P+S+S)	Time	Deficit
1st place, gold medalist(s)	1	Ole Einar Bjørndalen	Norway	0:00	2 (1+0+1+0)	32:21.2	
2nd place, silver medalist(s)	13	Maxim Tchoudov	Russia	1:03	3 (1+0+2+0)	33:31.0	+1:09.8
3rd place, bronze medalist(s)	16	Vincent Defrasne	France	1:11	1 (0+0+1+0)	33:31.1	+1:09.9
4	2	Michal Šlesingr	Czech Republic	0:05	3 (0+0+2+1)	33:35.9	+1:14.7
5	7	Emil Hegle Svendsen	Norway	0:48	3 (0+0+2+1)	33:38.4	+1:17.2
6	8	Raphaël Poirée	France	0:50	3 (1+0+1+1)	33:40.0	+1:18.8
7	5	Tomasz Sikora	Poland	0:39	3 (0+0+1+2)	33:40.6	+1:19.4
8	27	Dmitri Yaroshenko	Russia	1:38	1 (1+0+0+0)	33:48.7	+1:27.5
9	22	Ivan Tcherezov	Russia	1:35	1 (0+0+1+0)	33:57.3	+1:36.1
10	18	Michael Roesch	Germany	1:18	2 (0+0+1+1)	34:05.5	+1:44.3
11	14	Lars Berger	Norway	1:04	6 (0+2+1+3)	34:07.0	+1:45.8
12	19	Michael Greis	Germany	1:19	4 (1+0+2+1)	34:07.7	+1:46.5
13	17	Andreas Birnbacher	Germany	1:13	3 (1+0+1+1)	34:10.6	+1:49.4
14	15	Alexander Wolf	Germany	1:10	3 (0+0+2+1)	34:14.4	+1:53.2
15	30	Christoph Sumann	Austria	1:43	2 (1+0+0+1)	34:20.7	+1:59.5
16	12	Nikolay Kruglov	Russia	0:59	4 (0+0+3+1)	34:37.8	+2:16.6
17	43	Sven Fischer	Germany	2:22	0 (0+0+0+0)	34:39.9	+2:18.7
18	38	Jay Hakkinen	United States	2:11	1 (0+0+1+0)	34:45.3	+2:24.1
19	6	Mattias Nilsson	Sweden	0:40	4 (0+1+1+2)	34:48.8	+2:27.6
20	23	Halvard Hanevold	Norway	1:35	2 (1+1+0+0)	34:52.3	+2:31.1
21	28	Friedrich Pinter	Austria	1:39	2 (0+0+2+0)	34:56.3	+2:35.1
22	4	Björn Ferry	Sweden	0:34	5 (1+0+2+2)	35:07.5	+2:46.3
23	34	Carl Johan Bergman	Sweden	1:48	3 (1+1+0+1)	35:12.2	+2:51.0
24	10	Matthias Simmen	Switzerland	0:57	6 (1+1+2+2)	35:12.2	+2:51.0
25	37	Simon Fourcade	France	2:08	3 (1+0+1+1)	35:23.6	+3:02.4
26	3	Andriy Deryzemlya	Ukraine	0:26	5 (1+1+0+3)	35:31.2	+3:10.0
27	24	Wilfried Pallhuber	Italy	1:35	3 (0+0+1+2)	35:35.6	+3:14.4
28	9	Rene Laurent Vuillermoz	Italy	0:54	6 (1+0+3+2)	35:46.7	+3:25.5
29	36	Alexei Korobeynikov	Ukraine	2:02	3 (0+1+2+0)	35:51.6	+3:30.4
30	33	Magnús Jónsson	Sweden	1:48	3 (1+0+1+1)	35:55.5	+3:34.3
31	29	Alexei Aidarov	Ukraine	1:40	3 (0+1+1+1)	36:06.0	+3:44.8
32	35	Tim Burke	United States	1:58	5 (0+1+2+2)	36:06.5	+3:45.3
33	32	Jaroslav Soukup	Czech Republic	1:45	5 (1+1+2+1)	36:10.4	+3:49.2
34	25	Janez Marič	Slovenia	1:36	6 (2+1+2+1)	36:10.5	+3:49.3
35	26	Daniel Mesotitsch	Austria	1:38	6 (2+1+3+0)	36:37.7	+4:16.5
36	40	Rustam Valiullin	Belarus	2:17	3 (1+0+1+1)	36:54.1	+4:32.9
37	42	Roland Lessing	Estonia	2:21	4 (2+0+2+0)	36:55.3	+4:34.1
38	21	Olexander Bilanenko	Ukraine	1:30	6 (2+2+1+1)	36:55.6	+4:34.4
39	39	Sergey Novikov	Belarus	2:11	4 (0+1+2+1)	36:59.8	+4:38.6
40	50	Roman Dostál	Czech Republic	2:49	3 (0+1+1+1)	37:16.0	+4:54.8
41	44	Ludwig Gredler	Austria	2:24	5 (1+2+1+1)	37:16.9	+4:55.7
42	49	Jouni Kinnunen	Finland	2:49	1 (0+0+1+0)	37:44.5	+5:23.3
43	59	Ferréol Cannard	France	3:23	1 (0+0+0+1)	37:55.9	+5:34.7
44	11	Christian De Lorenzi	Italy	0:57	7 (2+2+3+0)	38:01.4	+5:40.2
45	31	Klemen Bauer	Slovenia	1:44	7 (0+1+4+2)	38:04.5	+5:43.3
46	46	Jeremy Teela	United States	2:32	7 (2+0+3+2)	38:05.2	+5:44.0
47	54	Gregor Brvar	Slovenia	3:08	3 (1+0+1+1)	38:13.6	+5:52.4
48	51	Timo Antila	Finland	2:57	4 (2+2+0+0)	38:18.9	+5:57.7
49	56	Ondřej Moravec	Czech Republic	3:17	5 (1+1+2+1)	38:22.3	+6:01.1
50	48	Lowell Bailey	United States	2:45	6 (2+0+3+1)	38:25.4	+6:04.2
51	45	Vasja Rupnik	Slovenia	2:24	7 (0+1+3+3)	38:46.1	+6:24.9
52	52	Simon Hallenbarter	Switzerland	2:58	5 (1+2+1+1)	39:03.0	+6:41.8
53	57	Jarkko Kauppinen	Finland	3:19	3 (1+0+1+1)	39:09.8	+6:48.6
54	58	Alexandr Syman	Belarus	3:20	7 (2+2+1+2)	39:59.4	+7:38.2
55	53	Jaime Robb	Canada	3:05	7 (2+0+3+2)	40:01.2	+7:40.0
	20	Indrek Tobreluts	Estonia	1:22	(2+3+2+ )	Did not finish	
	47	Markus Windisch	Italy	2:33	(3+4+ + )	Did not finish	
	55	Mirosław Kobus	Poland	3:12	(2+3+ + )	Lapped	
	41	Wiesław Ziemianin	Poland	2:19	Did not start		
	60	Robin Clegg	Canada	3:25	Did not start		
