= Biathlon at the 2006 Winter Olympics – Men's pursuit =

Men's biathlon pursuit at the XX Olympic Winter Games
- Men's biathlon 12.5 km pursuit final
- Venue: Cesana San Sicario
- Dates: 18 February 2006
- Competitors: 57 from 23 nations
- Winning time: 35:20.2

Medalists
1st place, gold medalist(s)		Vincent Defrasne	France
2nd place, silver medalist(s)		Ole Einar Bjørndalen	Norway
3rd place, bronze medalist(s)		Sven Fischer	Germany

The Men's 12.5 kilometre biathlon pursuit competition at the 2006 Winter Olympics in Turin, Italy was held on 18 February, at Cesana San Sicario. Competitors raced over five loops of a 2.5 kilometre skiing course, shooting twenty times, ten prone and ten standing. Each miss required a competitor to ski a 150-metre penalty loop.

The starting order for the pursuit was based on the results of the sprint; the top 60 finishers in that race qualified for the pursuit. In addition, each racer's final deficit behind sprint winner Sven Fischer corresponded to their starting deficit in the pursuit; Halvard Hanevold, who finished 8 seconds behind Fischer in the sprint, started 8 seconds after him in the pursuit. The winner was the first racer over the finish line, Vincent Defrasne.

Ole Einar Bjørndalen was the defending World and Olympic champion in this event, but was ranked fourth in the World Cup standings before the Games, behind Germany's Michael Rösch, Frenchman Raphaël Poirée and another German, Sven Fischer.

== Results ==
Two Austrian athletes were disqualified after the IOC determined they had violated the Anti-Doping rules; Wolfgang Rottmann had originally placed 21st, while Wolfgang Perner had placed 25th.

The race was held at 14:30.

Rank	Bib	Name	Country	Start	Time	Penalties (P+P+S+S)	Deficit
1st place, gold medalist(s)	5	Vincent Defrasne	France	0:43	35:20.2	2 (0+0+0+2)	–
2nd place, silver medalist(s)	12	Ole Einar Bjørndalen	Norway	1:14	35:22.9	3 (0+1+1+1)	+2.7
3rd place, bronze medalist(s)	1	Sven Fischer	Germany	0:00	35:35.8	4 (2+2+0+0)	+15.6
4	13	Ilmārs Bricis	Latvia	1:15	35:46.9	1 (0+1+0+0)	+26.7
5	2	Halvard Hanevold	Norway	0:08	35:57.7	3 (0+0+3+0)	+37.5
6	3	Frode Andresen	Norway	0:20	36:16.9	5 (0+3+1+1)	+56.7
7	16	Christoph Sumann	Austria	1:31	36:39.7	2 (1+0+1+0)	+1:19.5
8	35	Michael Greis	Germany	2:11	36:39.9	1 (1+0+0+0)	+1:19.7
9	10	Maxim Tchoudov	Russia	1:09	36:41.4	4 (2+0+0+2)	+1:21.2
10	19	Julien Robert	France	1:43	37:15.9	1 (1+0+0+0)	+1:55.7
11	22	Nikolay Kruglov, Jr.	Russia	1:54	37:18.9	0 (0+0+0+0)	+1:58.7
12	7	Ricco Groß	Germany	1:04	37:23.5	2 (1+0+0+1)	+2:03.3
13	41	Rene Laurent Vuillermoz	Italy	2:35	37:27.3	2 (1+1+0+0)	+2:07.1
14	28	Christian De Lorenzi	Italy	2:03	37:28.5	2 (0+1+0+1)	+2:08.3
15	6	Ivan Tcherezov	Russia	0:57	37:29.7	3 (1+1+1+0)	+2:09.5
16	11	Zdeněk Vítek	Czech Republic	1:13	37:30.2	4 (1+0+1+2)	+2:10.0
17	23	Wilfried Pallhuber	Italy	1:54	37:30.3	2 (0+1+0+1)	+2:10.1
18	20	Tomasz Sikora	Poland	1:43	37:31.6	4 (2+0+1+1)	+2:11.4
19	15	Alexander Wolf	Germany	1:23	37:35.4	4 (0+2+0+2)	+2:15.2
20	8	Mattias Nilsson	Sweden	1:07	37:47.4	3 (1+1+0+1)	+2:27.2
21	17	Stian Eckhoff	Norway	1:36	38:00.2	4 (1+2+0+1)	+2:40.0
22	47	Paavo Puurunen	Finland	2:46	38:01.2	1 (0+0+1+0)	+2:41.0
23	45	Matthias Simmen	Switzerland	2:45	38:08.8	1 (1+0+0+0)	+2:48.6
24	31	Pavol Hurajt	Slovakia	2:06	38:20.6	2 (0+2+0+0)	+3:00.4
25	14	Björn Ferry	Sweden	1:20	38:25.5	4 (1+0+0+3)	+3:04.2
26	25	Rustam Valiullin	Belarus	1:57	38:32.7	5 (2+1+2+0)	+3:12.5
27	30	Oleg Ryzhenkov	Belarus	2:04	38:37.8	5 (1+0+2+2)	+3:17.6
28	26	Wiesław Ziemianin	Poland	1:59	38:42.3	1 (0+1+0+0)	+3:22.1
29	44	Roman Dostál	Czech Republic	2:39	38:48.0	4 (0+0+2+2)	+3:27.8
30	32	Sergei Novikov	Belarus	2:07	38:49.6	4 (0+1+2+1)	+3:29.4
31	29	Andriy Deryzemlya	Ukraine	2:04	38:54.3	4 (2+0+2+0)	+3:34.1
32	57	Michal Šlesingr	Czech Republic	3:11	39:03.7	1 (0+0+1+0)	+3:43.5
33	21	Vitaliy Rudenchyk	Bulgaria	1:48	39:04.7	4 (1+1+2+0)	+3:44.5
34	18	Zhang Chengye	China	1:39	39:04.7	7 (0+1+2+4)	+3:44.5
35	40	Hidenori Isa	Japan	2:26	39:11.2	4 (2+0+2+0)	+3:51.0
36	37	Tim Burke	United States	2:16	39:17.6	4 (0+2+2+0)	+3:57.4
37	38	Janez Marič	Slovenia	2:17	39:42.4	4 (0+1+1+2)	+4:22.2
38	39	David Ekholm	Sweden	2:22	39:43.8	3 (2+1+0+0)	+4:23.6
39	34	Ondřej Moravec	Czech Republic	2:09	39:52.3	4 (1+0+2+1)	+4:32.1
40	33	Ferreol Cannard	France	2:08	40:07.7	5 (2+0+1+2)	+4:47.5
41	46	Ruslan Lysenko	Ukraine	2:45	40:16.4	3 (1+1+0+1)	+4:56.2
42	50	Jānis Bērziņš	Latvia	2:58	40:22.8	1 (1+0+0+0)	+5:02.6
43	45	Indrek Tobreluts	Estonia	2:36	40:25.8	4 (2+1+1+0)	+5:05.6
44	52	Robin Clegg	Canada	3:01	40:30.3	4 (2+0+1+1)	+5:10.1
45	54	Ludwig Gredler	Austria	3:06	40:57.5	6 (2+1+3+0)	+5:37.3
46	51	Raivis Zimelis	Latvia	3:00	40:58.0	5 (1+1+1+2)	+5:37.8
47	43	David Leoni	Canada	2:39	41:07.4	5 (1+0+3+1)	+5:47.2
48	48	Lowell Bailey	United States	2:50	41:31.3	6 (3+1+1+1)	+6:11.1
49	53	Miroslav Matiaško	Slovakia	3:01	41:32.5	6 (2+2+1+1)	+6:12.3
50	49	Tatsumi Kasahara	Japan	2:55	41:42.0	6 (1+1+2+2)	+6:21.8
51	60	Roland Lessing	Estonia	3:19	41:53.4	4 (1+1+1+1)	+6:33.2
52	59	Matej Kazár	Slovakia	3:18	42:46.6	7 (2+1+2+2)	+7:26.4
53	58	Alexandr Chervyakov	Kazakhstan	3:16	43:28.4	6 (2+0+2+2)	+8:08.2
54	56	Kristaps Libietis	Latvia	3:10	43:51.2	6 (1+0+3+2)	+8:31.0
	9	Raphaël Poirée	France	1:07	DNF	2 (2+0+ + )	–
	24	Sergei Tchepikov	Russia	1:57	Did not start		
	36	Olexander Bilanenko	Ukraine	2:15	Did not start		
	55	Carl Johan Bergman	Sweden	3:10	Did not start		
DSQ	27	Wolfgang Rottman	Austria	2:00	37:50.5	4 (0+2+1+1)	+2:30.3
DSQ	4	Wolfgang Perner	Austria	0:40	38:13.5	7 (3+3+0+1)	+2:53.3
