= Biathlon World Championships 2010 =

43rd edition of the Biathlon World Championships

Mixed relay at the Biathlon World Championships 2010
- Date: 28 March 2010
- Competitors: 72 from 18 nations
- Winning time: 1:18:17.4

Medalists
gold medal	Simone Hauswald; Magdalena Neuner; Simon Schempp; Arnd Peiffer	Germany
silver medal	Ann Kristin Flatland; Tora Berger; Emil Hegle Svendsen; Ole Einar Bjørndalen	Norway
bronze medal	Helena Jonsson; Anna Carin Olofsson-Zidek; Björn Ferry; Carl Johan Bergman	Sweden

The mixed relay Biathlon World Championships was held in Khanty-Mansiysk, Russia on 28 March 2010. As for the rules of biathlon in the year of the Winter Olympic Games World Championships being played only in disciplines not included in the Olympic program, therefore the championship consists only of the mixed relay. Contested since 2005, mixed relay is the most recently introduced event at the Championships, this was the 6th and last competition as the mixed event was included at the Olympic Program at the 2014 Winter Olympics.

== Mixed relay ==
The following are the results of the event.

Rank	Bib	Country	Time	Penalties (P+S)	Deficit
1st place, gold medalist(s)	2	Germany Simone Hauswald; Magdalena Neuner; Simon Schempp; Arnd Peiffer	1:18:17.4; 18:36.0; 18:32.7; 20:44.7; 20:24.0	0+5 0+1; 0+2 0+1; 0+1 0+0; 0+0 0+0; 0+2 0+0	
2nd place, silver medalist(s)	4	Norway Ann Kristin Flatland; Tora Berger; Emil Hegle Svendsen; Ole Einar Bjørndalen	1:19:41.4; 18:58.5; 19:31.0; 20:44.6; 20:27.3	0+2 0+4; 0+0 0+1; 0+1 0+2; 0+0 0+0; 0+1 0+1	+1:24.0
3rd place, bronze medalist(s)	5	Sweden Helena Jonsson; Anna Carin Olofsson-Zidek; Björn Ferry; Carl Johan Bergman	1:19:48.2; 19:16.0; 19:30.1; 21:15.2; 19:46.9	0+6 0+5; 0+2 0+3; 0+3 0+0; 0+1 0+1; 0+0 0+1	+1:30.8
4	1	Russia Yana Romanova; Olga Zaitseva; Maxim Tchoudov; Ivan Tcherezov	1:19:59.5; 19:04.9; 20:06.5; 21:08.1; 19:40.0	0+3 1+6; 0+0 0+1; 0+0 1+3; 0+3 0+2; 0+0 0+0	+1:42.1
5	3	France Marie-Laure Brunet; Sandrine Bailly; Simon Fourcade; Martin Fourcade	1:20:25.6; 19:24.0; 20:22.4; 20:14.6; 20:24.6	0+6 0+3; 0+2 0+0; 0+3 0+1; 0+0 0+1; 0+1 0+1	+2:08.2
6	6	Ukraine Oksana Khvostenko; Vita Semerenko; Serguei Sednev; Andriy Deryzemlya	1:20:41.7; 18:50.6; 20:04.2; 21:05.4; 20:41.5	0+3 0+7; 0+0 0+0; 0+2 0+2; 0+0 0+2; 0+1 0+3	+2:24.3
7	9	Czech Republic Gabriela Soukalová; Barbora Tomešová; Michal Šlesingr; Jaroslav Soukup	1:20:56.8; 19:28.6; 19:44.1; 20:32.2; 21:11.9	0+6 0+4; 0+1 0+1; 0+1 0+0; 0+1 0+1; 0+3 0+2	+2:39.4
8	10	Italy Katja Haller; Karin Oberhofer; Lukas Hofer; Christian De Lorenzi	1:20:58.4; 19:16.4; 20:21.5; 20:51.0; 20:29.5	0+4 0+4; 0+0 0+1; 0+2 0+0; 0+1 0+3; 0+1 0+0	+2:41.0
9	7	Belarus Liudmila Kalinchik; Darya Domracheva; Sergey Novikov; Rustam Valiullin	1:21:50.4; 19:20.8; 19:28.2; 21:21.1; 21:40.3	1+3 0+6; 0+0 0+1; 0+0 0+2; 0+0 0+2; 1+3 0+1	+3:33.0
10	15	Kazakhstan Anna Lebedeva; Marina Lebedeva; Yan Savitskiy; Sergey Naumik	1:23:12.9; 19:49.2; 20:32.3; 21:11.5; 21:39.9	0+7 0+6; 0+2 0+1; 0+1 0+2; 0+1 0+1; 0+3 0+2	+4:55.5
11	12	Canada Megan Tandy; Zina Kocher; Jean-Philippe Le Guellec; Brendan Green	1:23:56.8; 20:08.4; 21:01.7; 22:00.1; 20:46.6	0+1 2+10; 0+0 0+3; 0+0 1+3; 0+1 1+3; 0+0 0+1	+5:39.4
12	17	Switzerland Selina Gasparin; Elisa Gasparin; Benjamin Weger; Thomas Frei	1:24:49.3; 20:17.5; 22:09.8; 21:12.6; 21:09.4	0+3 1+9; 0+0 1+3; 0+1 0+3; 0+2 0+0; 0+0 0+3	+6:31.9
13	13	Slovakia Jana Gereková; Anastasiya Kuzmina; Pavol Hurajt; Dušan Šimočko	1:24:54.0; 20:24.2; 20:41.9; 21:39.7; 22:08.2	2+8 1+7; 1+3 0+1; 1+3 0+0; 0+1 0+3; 0+1 1+3	+6:36.6
14	11	Poland Agnieszka Cyl; Weronika Nowakowska; Sebastian Witek; Łukasz Witek	1:25:04.5; 19:19.3; 19:13.4; 22:53.2; 23:38.6	0+5 1+5; 0+1 0+0; 0+0 0+0; 0+2 0+2; 0+2 1+3	+6:47.1
15	18	Bulgaria Nina Klenovska; Emilia Yordanova; Krasimir Anev; Michail Kletcherov	1:25:34.7; 20:18.0; 21:55.2; 21:43.9; 21:37.6	0+7 1+8; 0+1 1+3; 0+3 0+2; 0+3 0+1; 0+0 0+2	+7:17.3
16	16	Estonia Kadri Lehtla; Eveli Saue; Danil Steptsenko; Priit Viks	1:26:24.7; 19:47.9; 20:30.1; 23:17.9; 22:48.8	2+8 1+6; 0+0 0+2; 1+3 0+0; 1+3 0+1; 0+2 1+3	+8:07.3
17	14	Finland Mari Laukkanen; Kaisa Mäkäräinen; Sami Orpana; Marko Juhani Mänttäri	1:27:16.8; 20:39.0; 19:50.1; 24:15.1; 22:32.6	1+5 0+6; 0+2 0+1; 0+0 0+2; 1+3 0+1; 0+0 0+2	+8:59.4
	8	Slovenia Dijana Ravnikar; Teja Gregorin; Janez Marič; Klemen Bauer	DSQ		
