= Daisuke Ebisawa =

Japanese biathlete (born 1978)

Personal information
- Nationality: Japanese
- Born: 26 May 1978 (age 46); Aomori, Japan

Sport
- Sport: Biathlon

Daisuke Ebisawa (born 26 May 1978) is a Japanese biathlete. He competed in the men's sprint event at the 2006 Winter Olympics.
