= Miro Ćosić =

Bosnian biathlete (born 1983)

Personal information
- Nationality: Bosnian
- Born: 9 September 1983 (age 41); Sarajevo, SFR Yugoslavia

Sport
- Sport: Biathlon

Miro Ćosić (born 9 September 1983) is a Bosnian biathlete. He competed in the men's 20 km individual event at the 2006 Winter Olympics.
