= Tom Clemens =

British biathlete (born 1976)

Personal information
- Nationality: British
- Born: 30 January 1976 (age 49); Epping, England

Sport
- Sport: Biathlon

Tom Clemens (born 30 January 1976) is a British biathlete. He competed in the men's 20 km individual event at the 2006 Winter Olympics.
