= Matjaž Poklukar =

Slovenian biathlete (born 1973)

Personal information
- Nationality: Slovenian
- Born: 30 January 1973 (age 52); Jesenice, Yugoslavia

Sport
- Sport: Biathlon

Matjaž Poklukar (born 30 January 1973) is a Slovenian biathlete. He competed in the men's 20 km individual event at the 2006 Winter Olympics.
