= Kristaps Lībietis =

Latvian biathlete (born 1982)

Personal information
- Born: 28 May 1982 (age 44) Alūksne, Latvian SSR, Soviet Union

Sport
- Sport: Skiing
- Updated on 28 February 2013

Kristaps Lībietis (born in Alūksne on 28 May 1982) is a retired Latvian biathlete.

He competed in the 2006 and 2010 Winter Olympics for Latvia. His best performance is 19th, in 2010 as part of the Latvian relay team. His best individual performance is 54th, in the 2006 sprint and pursuit. In 2006, he also finished 68th in the individual, and in 2010 he finished 64th in the sprint and 70th in the individual.

As of February 2013, his best performance at the Biathlon World Championships, is 17th, in the 2009 men's relay. His best individual performance is 50th, in the 2008 individual.

As of February 2013, his best Biathlon World Cup finish is 7th, as part of the Latvian men's relay team at Oberhof in 2009/10. His best individual finish is 37th, in the individual at Östersund in 2008/09. His best overall finish in the Biathlon World Cup is 104th, in 2008/09.
