= Grzegorz Bodziana =

Polish biathlete (born 1981)

Personal information
- Nationality: Polish
- Born: 3 June 1981 (age 43); Duszniki-Zdrój, Poland

Sport
- Sport: Biathlon

Grzegorz Bodziana (born 3 June 1981) is a Polish biathlete. He competed in the men's 20 km individual event at the 2006 Winter Olympics.
