= Marco Zúñiga =

Chilean biathlete (born 1978)

Personal information
- Nationality: Chilean
- Born: 3 December 1978 (age 46)

Sport
- Sport: Biathlon

Marco Zúñiga (born 3 December 1978) is a Chilean biathlete. He competed in the men's 20 km individual event at the 2006 Winter Olympics.
