= Bojan Samardžija =

Bosnia and Herzegovina cross-country skier (born 1985)

Personal information
- Nationality: Bosnia and Herzegovina
- Born: 5 December 1985 (age 40) Sokolac, Yugoslavia

Sport
- Sport: Cross-country skiing

Bojan Samardžija (born 5 December 1985) is a Bosnia and Herzegovina cross-country skier. He competed in the men's 15 kilometre classical event at the 2006 Winter Olympics.
