= Imre Tagscherer =

Hungarian biathlete and cross-country skier (born 1972)

Personal information
- Born: 25 May 1972 (age 54) Budapest, Hungary

Sport
- Sport: Skiing
- Updated on 28 February 2013

Imre Tagscherer (born in Budapest on 25 May 1972) is a Hungarian biathlete and cross-country skier.

He competed in the 2002, 2006 and 2010 Winter Olympics for Hungary. His best performance is 48th, in the 2002 cross-country sprint. In 2002, he also finished 74th in the first half of the cross-country pursuit, 75th in the biathlon sprint and 70th in the individual. In 2006, completing only in biathlon, he finished 74th in the sprint and 77th in the individual. In 2010 he finished 80th in the sprint and 82nd in the individual.

As of February 2013, his best performance at the Biathlon World Championships is 22nd, as part of the Hungarian men's relay team in 1995 and 1996. His best individual performance is 77th, in the 1999 individual.

As of February 2013, his best performance at the FIS Nordic World Ski Championships, is 16th, in the 2007 team sprint. His best individual performance is 61st, in the 2007 individual sprint.

As of February 2013, his best Biathlon World Cup finish is 26th, as part of the Hungarian men's relay team at Östersund in 2009/10. His best individual finish is 67th, achieved twice in 1998/99.
