= Károly Gombos =

Hungarian cross-country skier and biathlete (born 1981)

Károly Gombos (born 3 October 1981, in Budapest) is a Hungarian cross-country skier and biathlete.

== Brief biography ==
Károly made his maiden appearance in biathlon in 2005. The event that motivated him to this sport cannot be better explained than his own words: "The first time I saw biathlon on television with English commentary, it pleased me at once. I later watched a race in Slovakia with guys skiing with a pair of narrow skis in a dense forest, and it became clear this sport was made for me." Competing in international racing, he represented Hungary for the first time in the World Cup(Ostersund). He has been coached by: Edes Janos (personal), Brigitta Bereczki (national).

Károly studied horticulture, wine science from Corvinus University of Budapest. He is engaged in business and runs a holiday home in Ramsau am Dachstein, Austria. His hobbies include, Skiing, clay target shooting, cycling, reading, mountain running. Born to a sporting family, his father competed for Hungary in shooting at the 1996 Summer Olympics in Atlanta.
