= Tim Burke (biathlete) =

American biathlete (born 1982)

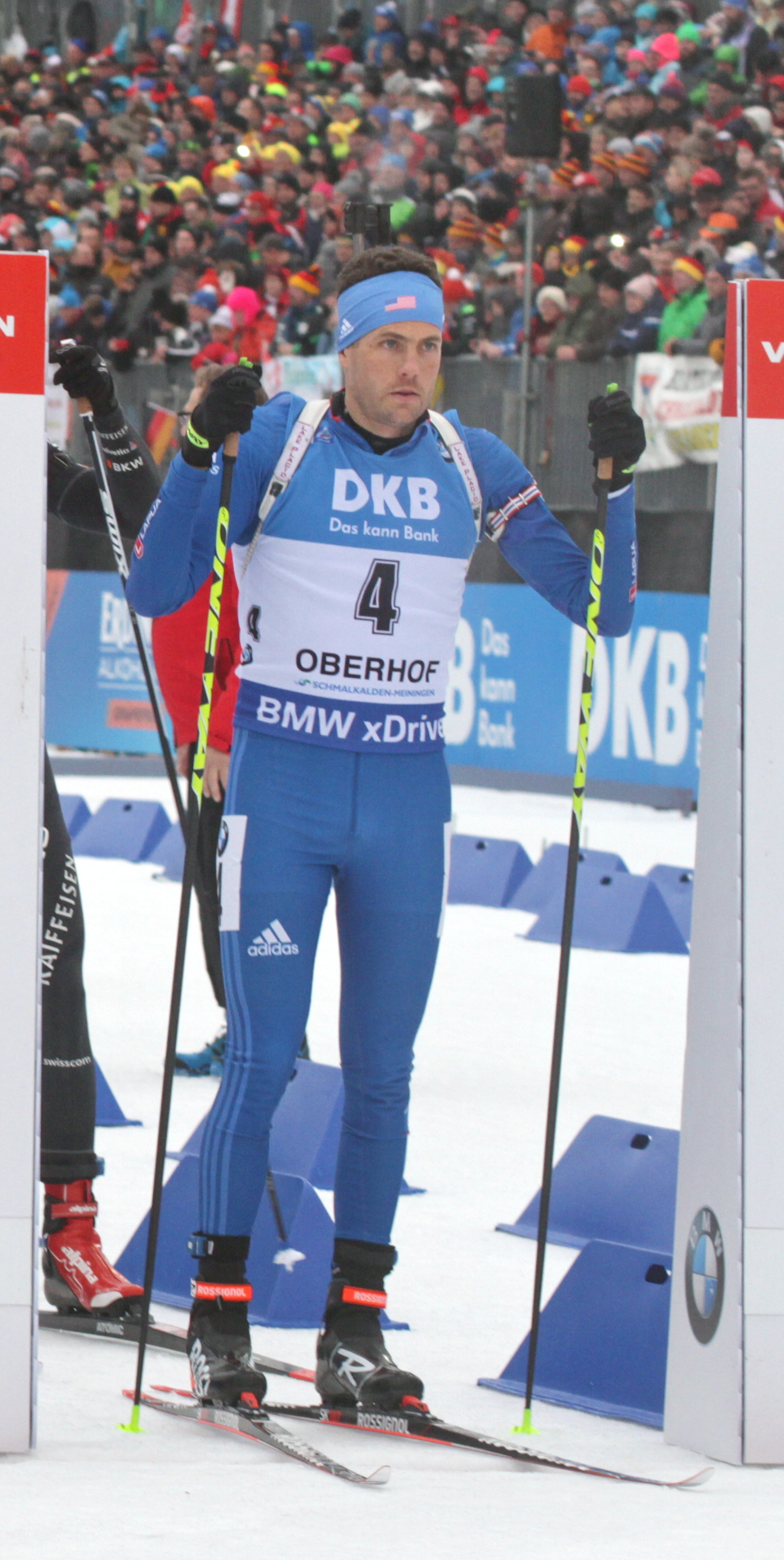
- Burke in 2018

Personal information
- Full name: Timothy John Burke
- Born: February 3, 1982 (age 44) Paul Smiths, New York, United States
- Height: 1.80 m (5 ft 11 in)

Sport
- Sport: Skiing
- Club: Lake Placid Biathlon Club

World Cup career
- Seasons: 2004–2018
- Indiv. podiums: 6
Medal record
Men's biathlon
Representing United States
World Championships
Silver medal – second place	2013 Nové Město	20 km individual
- Updated on 14 February 2013

Timothy John Burke (born February 3, 1982, in Paul Smiths, New York) is a retired U.S. biathlete and coach. On December 20, 2009, he became the first ever US biathlete to lead the overall Biathlon World Cup. During his career he competed in 11 Biathlon World Championships and four Winter Olympic Games, won a World Championship silver and took six podiums in World Cup races.

== Career ==
=== Early career ===
Burke first took up biathlon in 1997 and soon became a promising prospect on the national level, first competing for the United States in the Biathlon Junior World Championships in 2000. Burke competed in the World Junior Championships another three times, but without ever finishing in the top 10.

Burke's formative years were plagued by ill health. Most critically, he had career-threatening hip problems in 2002, eventually managing a full recovery after surgery. He also suffered from mononucleosis.

=== First World Cup seasons ===
Burke debuted in the Biathlon World Cup in the latter half of the 2003–04 season at Ruhpolding, Germany. This season also marked Burke's first World Championships; however, he failed to make an international impact, not achieving any World Cup points.

Burke made his first US Olympic team in 2006, and came quite close to achieving his first World Cup points (the Olympics being part of the Biathlon World Cup), placing 35th in the sprint and 36th in the following pursuit. (Note: At the time, only the top 30 were awarded Biathlon World Cup points. This was revised upwards to 40 starting in 2008–09. Burke had previously finished 33rd in a World Cup competition at Hochfilzen, Austria.) However, his moment of international attention came as Jay Hakkinen surprisingly brought the US team to the first exchange in first place. Burke, on the second leg, thus had the honour of leading the Olympic relay. However, this did not last long, as US dropped to 8th place on Burke's leg with him needing all three spare rounds in both shootings; they eventually finished 9th.

Per Nilsson of Sweden became the head coach of team US in 2006. Burke, whose results soon improved markedly under Nilsson's guidance, credits the Swede with "teaching me what hard training really looks like." The 2006–07 season was a great success for Burke, who got the first World Cup point of his career already in the season-opening 20 km individual at Östersund, Sweden with a 30th place and followed up with another five points finishes, including the first top 10 finish of his World Cup career in a sprint at Hochfilzen, Austria. Burke got his season-best 6th-place finish in a mass start at Pokljuka, Slovenia on January 21, 2007. At the World Championships in Antholz, Italy, Burke placed 7th in the individual competition. He eventually finished a very respectable 25th in the overall World Cup standings.

The 2007–08 season was a disappointment as Burke suffered from health problems again and failed to improve on the previous year, finishing 29th in the overall World Cup. However, Burke finished that year on a high note as in the second-last race of the season, a pursuit at Holmenkollen, Oslo, Norway he became the first ever US biathlete to have the best scratch time in a World Cup competition; though as he entered the pursuit from a meager 45th place, he still only finished 7th. In the last race, a mass start, he placed 8th despite four penalty loops. These were his best finishes that year.

=== 2009–10 World Cup season ===
The first half of the 2009–10 Biathlon World Cup season marked Burke's breakthrough to the absolute elite of biathlon. In an individual 20 km competition at Östersund, Sweden, the opener of the 2009–10 World Cup season, Burke became the second ever US biathlete to finish 2nd in a Biathlon World Cup competition. (Josh Thompson had been the first.) Burke continued to produce solid results in the following competitions, consistently finishing in the top 20. This solidity – combined with the absence of Norwegian World Cup leader Emil Hegle Svendsen from the third competition weekend at Pokljuka, Slovenia and the disastrous 103rd place of Austria's Christoph Sumann in the Pokljuka sprint – meant that on December 20, 2009, Burke, despite never winning a World Cup race, became the first ever US biathlete to capture the overall World Cup lead.

Burke initially held that position for just one competition, as he only finished 19th in a 10 km sprint at Oberhof, Germany, in adverse weather conditions. The winner, Evgeny Ustyugov of Russia, in turn captured the World Cup leader's yellow bib for the first time in his career. However, Burke recaptured the lead in the very next race (the first mass start of the season) by matching his career-best 2nd-place finish.

Burke then entered a slump with a season-worst 31st place the next weekend in a sprint at Ruhpolding. His bad form continued at Antholz, Italy, as he finished 29th in the 20 km individual competition and 21st in the sprint.

=== 2010 Winter Olympics ===
At the 2010 Vancouver Winter Games, Burke had big expectations and aimed to win a medal but instead left at one of the lowest in his 14 years as a USA national team member. This came as a disappointment to him as prior to the competition, he had medalled on the World Cup Tour. In addition, there was media hype around his participation as he was the first American to lead the Biathlon World Cup standings and was a strong medal contender. The increased media attention may have impacted his possible success, as he felt he did "a bad job dealing with that". There was also poor snow conditions which can lead to more friction for the athletes, resulting in slower speeds. Burke placed 18th in mass start, 45th in individual, 46th in pursuit, 47th in sprint and 13th in relay. His first race was the individual, where landing him at 45th place came as a shock to him as it was his lowest finish that season.

After his 15k mass start race, his coach, Nilsson, believed that Burke did not find the balance "between calm and aggressiveness". Burke reflected on his own race, suggesting it may have been the pressure that ultimately got to him and caused him to make the three misses that ended his chances in medalling. Evgeny Ustyugov from Russia, Martin Fourcade from France and Pavol Hurajt from Slovakia placed first, second and third, respectively.

=== After the Olympics ===
Burke's problems continued in the last races of the season. He fell ill after the Olympics and failed to score another top 20 finish until the second-last individual race of the season, a 10 km sprint at Khanty-Mansiysk, Russia, where he finished 11th despite one miss at both shooting stages. Thanks to his strong early season, he still finished a career-best 14th in the overall World Cup.

=== Post-competition career ===
After Burke retired from competition at the end of the 2017–18 season, in May 2018 he was announced as athlete development manager with U.S. Biathlon Association. The following year he was appointed to the newly created post of Director of Athlete Development with the USBA, working alongside his former team-mate Lowell Bailey, who had been appointed as the Association's High Performance Director.

== Personal life ==
Since October 25, 2014, Burke has been married to former German biathlete Andrea Henkel. He has expressed support for stricter gun control in the United States, stating during the 2018 Winter Olympics that although he was a keen hunter, "if locking up all my sport rifles and hunting rifles meant saving one life, I would do it".

== Biathlon results ==
All results are sourced from the International Biathlon Union.

=== Olympic Games ===
0 medals

Event	Individual	Sprint	Pursuit	Mass start	Relay	Mixed relay
(Italy) 2006 Turin	58th	35th	36th	—	9th	—N/a
(Canada) 2010 Vancouver	45th	47th	46th	18th	13th	—N/a
(Russia) 2014 Sochi	43rd	19th	22nd	21st	—	8th
(South Korea) 2018 Pyeongchang	41st	47th	17th	—	6th	15th

*The mixed relay was added as an event in 2014.

=== World Championships ===
1 medal (1 silver)

Event	Individual	Sprint	Pursuit	Mass start	Relay	Mixed relay
(Germany) 2004 Oberhorf	61st	71st	—	—	18th	—
(Austria) 2005 Hochfilzen	63rd	66th	—	—	—	—
(Italy) 2007 Antholz	7th	35th	32nd	24th	9th	—
(Sweden) 2008 Östersund	29th	9th	10th	25th	15th	—
(South Korea) 2009 Pyeongchang	14th	11th	21st	28th	21st	—
(Russia) 2011 Khanty-Mansiysk	30th	31st	30th	—	6th	—
(Germany) 2012 Ruhpolding	56th	10th	28th	23rd	10th	12th
(Czech Republic) 2013 Nové Město	Silver	28th	32nd	30th	12th	—
(Finland) 2015 Kontiolahti	31st	15th	20th	14th	14th	—
(Norway) 2016 Oslo Holmenkollen	44th	14th	17th	12th	8th	—
(Austria) 2017 Hochfilzen	36th	40th	32nd	—	7th	—

*During Olympic seasons competitions are only held for those events not included in the Olympic program.
**The mixed relay was added as an event in 2005.
