= Cameron Morton =

Australian biathlete

Cameron Morton is an Australian biathlete who competed at the 2006 Winter Olympics. He came 83rd and 82nd out of 89 and 90 competitors respectively in the 20 km and 10 km event.
