= Sebastian Beltrame =

Argentine biathlete (born 1983)

Personal information
- Born: 19 June 1983 (age 41); Ushuaia, Argentina

Sport
- Sport: Biathlon

Sebastian Beltrame (born 19 June 1983) is an Argentine biathlete. He competed in the men's 20 km individual event at the 2006 Winter Olympics.
