= Stavros Khristoforidis =

Greek biathlete (born 1974)

Personal information
- Nationality: Greek
- Born: 20 April 1974 (age 50); Rothenburg, Oberlausitz, East Germany

Sport
- Sport: Biathlon

Stavros Khristoforidis (born 20 April 1974) is a Greek biathlete. He competed at the 2002 Winter Olympics and the 2006 Winter Olympics.
