= Vitaly Rudenchik =

Bulgarian biathlete (born 1982)

Personal information
- Nationality: Bulgarian
- Born: 21 February 1982 (age 43); Prague, Czechoslovakia

Sport
- Sport: Biathlon

Vitaly Rudenchik (born 21 February 1982) is a Bulgarian biathlete. He competed in the men's 20 km individual event at the 2006 Winter Olympics.
