= Julien Robert =

French biathlete (born 1974)

Medal record

Men's biathlon

Representing France

Olympic Games
Bronze medal – third place	2002 Salt Lake City	4 × 7.5 km relay
Bronze medal – third place	2006 Turin	4 × 7.5 km relay

World Championships
Gold medal – first place	2001 Pokljuka	4 × 7.5 km relay

Julien Robert (born 11 December 1974 in Grenoble) is a retired French biathlete.

As a member of the French team, he won bronze at the 2002 Winter Olympics in Salt Lake City and at the 2006 Winter Olympics in Turin.

He also has two medals from World Championships: gold in Pokljuka in 2001, and bronze in Oberhof in 2004.

He was married to French Olympic Champion Florence Baverel-Robert. Now they are divorced.
