= Jānis Bērziņš (biathlete) =

Latvian biathlete (born 1984)

Personal information
- Nationality: Latvian
- Born: 9 January 1984 (age 41); Cēsis, Latvia

Sport
- Sport: Biathlon

Jānis Bērziņš (born 9 January 1984) is a Latvian biathlete. He competed in the men's 20 km individual event at the 2006 Winter Olympics.
