= Priit Viks =

Estonian biathlete (born 1982)

Priit Viks (born January 7, 1982, in Tartu) is a retired Estonian biathlete. He competed at the 2006 Winter Olympics in Turin. He represented Estonia at the 2010 Winter Olympics in Vancouver.
