= Michal Šlesingr =

Czech biathlete (born 1983)

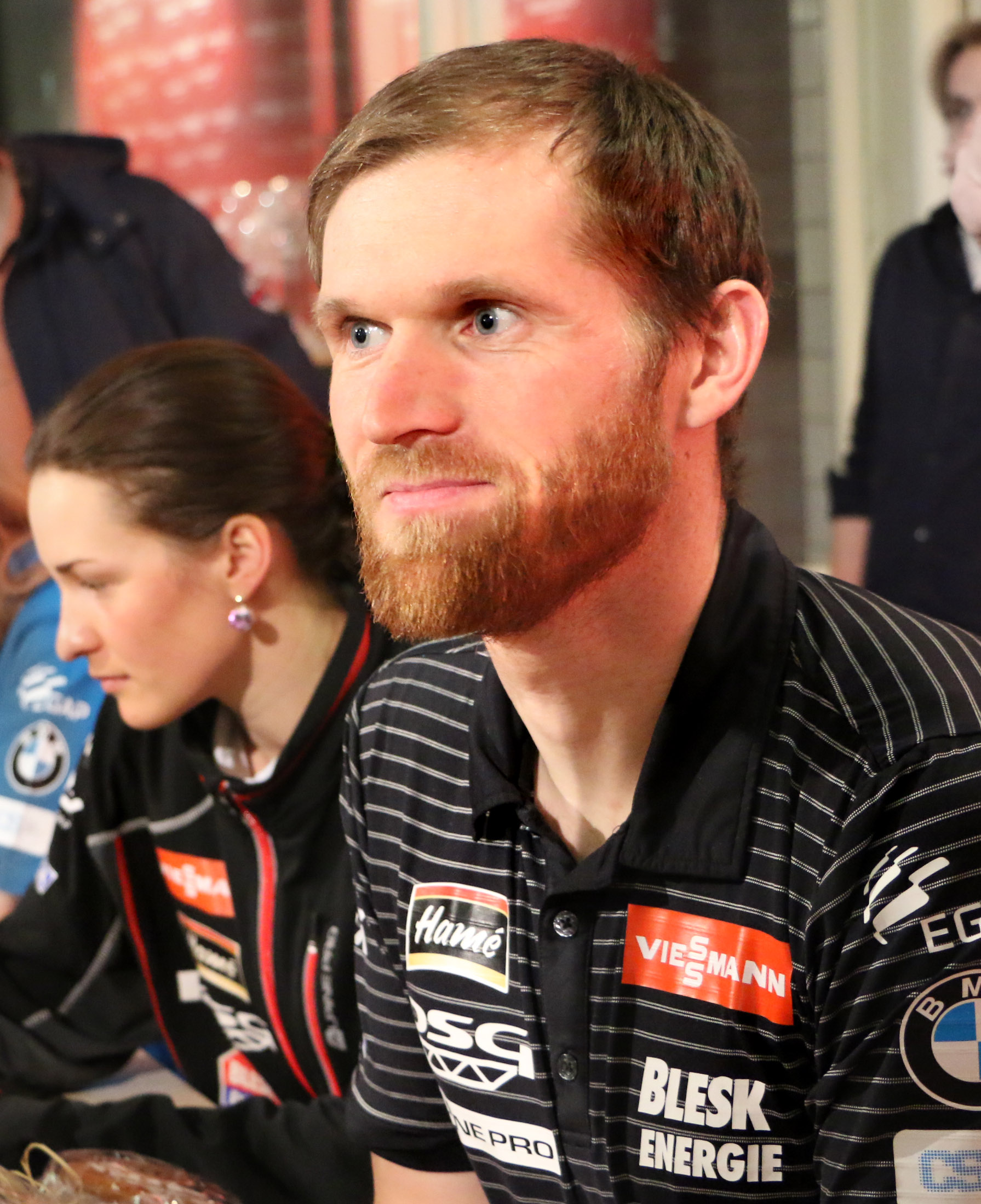
- Šlesingr in 2016

Personal information
- Born: 3 February 1983 (age 43) Ústí nad Orlicí, Czechoslovakia
- Height: 1.80 m (5 ft 11 in)

Sport

Professional information
- Sport: Biathlon
- Club: SKP Jablonec nad Nisou
- World Cup debut: 26 January 2002
- Retired: 7 March 2022

Olympic Games
- Teams: 4 (2006, 2010, 2014, 2018)
- Medals: 0

World Championships
- Teams: 14 (2003, 2004, 2005, 2007, 2008, 2009, 2010, 2011, 2012, 2013, 2015, 2016, 2017, 2019)
- Medals: 3 (1 gold)

World Cup
- Seasons: 18 (2001/02–)
- Individual victories: 1
- All victories: 2
- Individual podiums: 12
- All podiums: 19
Medal record
Men's biathlon
Representing Czech Republic
World Championships
Gold medal – first place	2015 Kontiolahti	Mixed relay
Silver medal – second place	2007 Antholz-Anterselva	10 km sprint
Bronze medal – third place	2007 Antholz-Anterselva	20 km individual
Junior World Championships
Gold medal – first place	2002 Ridnaun	12.5 km pursuit
Silver medal – second place	2002 Ridnaun	4 × 7.5 km relay
Silver medal – second place	2003 Kościelisko	10 km sprint
Silver medal – second place	2003 Kościelisko	12.5 km pursuit
Silver medal – second place	2004 Haute Maurienne	4 × 7.5 km relay
Bronze medal – third place	2002 Ridnaun	10 km sprint
Bronze medal – third place	2003 Kościelisko	4 × 7.5 km relay
- Updated on 30 November 2019

Michal Šlesingr (pronounced [ˈmɪxal ˈʃlɛsɪŋɡr̩]; born 3 February 1983) is a Czech former biathlete.

== Biathlon results ==
All results are sourced from the International Biathlon Union.

=== Olympic Games ===
Event	Individual	Sprint	Pursuit	Mass start	Relay	Mixed relay
(Italy) 2006 Turin	45th	55th	32nd	—	6th	—N/a
(Canada) 2010 Vancouver	17th	18th	29th	16th	7th	—N/a
(Russia) 2014 Sochi	57th	31st	DNS	—	—	—
(South Korea) 2018 Pyeongchang	45th	69th	—	—	7th	—

*The mixed relay was added as an event in 2014.

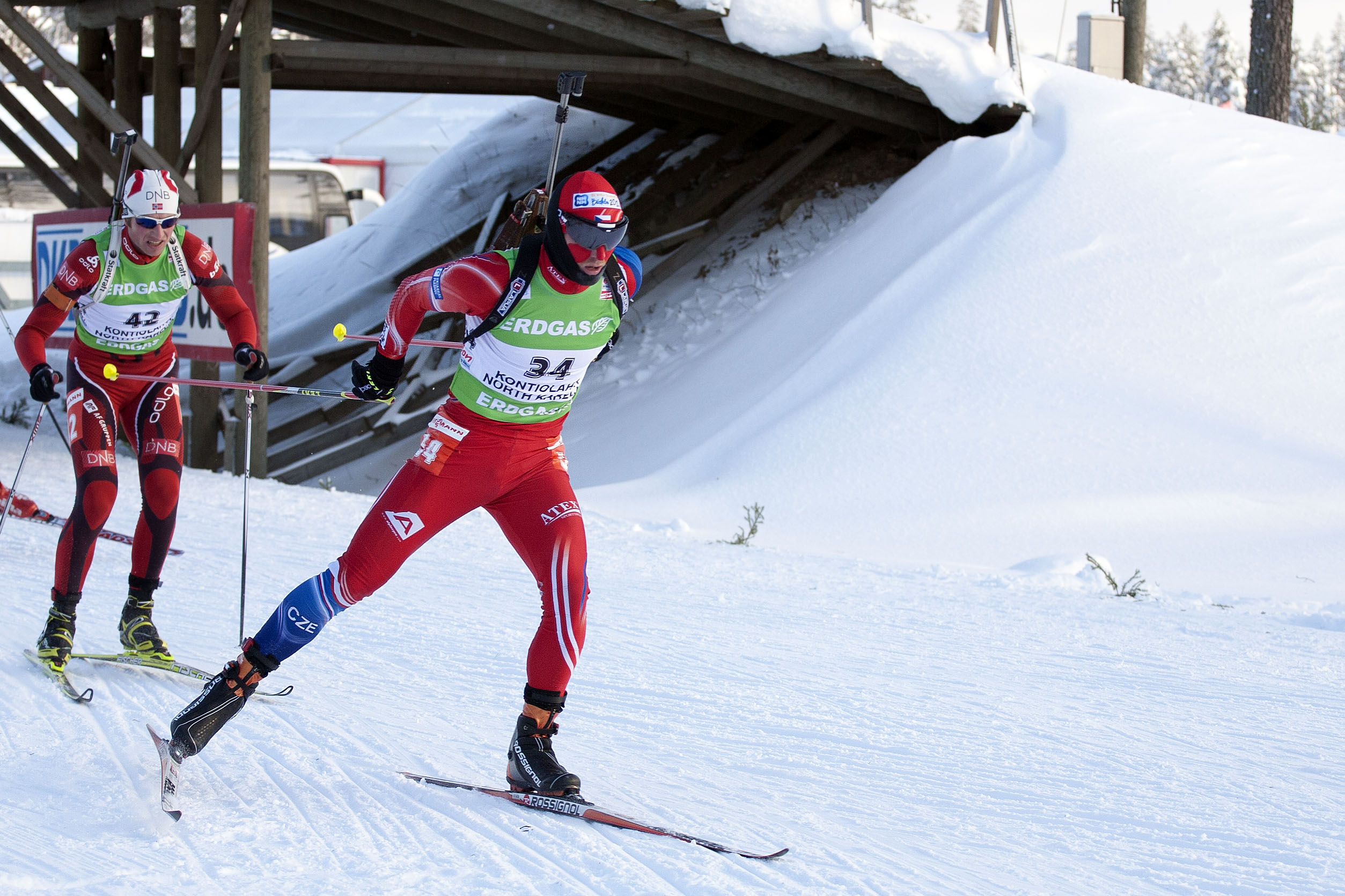
Kontiolahti, Finland, 12 February 2012

=== World Championships ===
3 medals (1 gold, 1 silver, 1 bronze)

Event	Individual	Sprint	Pursuit	Mass start	Relay	Mixed relay	Single mixed relay
(Russia) 2003 Khanty-Mansiysk	27th	50th	39th	—	6th	—N/a	—N/a
(Germany) 2004 Oberhof	22nd	41st	44th	—	8th	—N/a	—N/a
(Austria) 2005 Hochfilzen	9th	59th	18th	21st	11th	4th	—N/a
(Italy) 2007 Antholz-Anterselva	Bronze	Silver	4th	20th	5th	—	—N/a
(Sweden) 2008 Östersund	10th	6th	5th	26th	7th	—	—N/a
(South Korea) 2009 Pyeongchang	38th	32nd	19th	—	10th	—	—N/a
(Russia) 2010 Khanty-Mansiysk	—N/a	—N/a	—N/a	—N/a	—N/a	7th	—N/a
(Russia) 2011 Khanty-Mansiysk	12th	12th	8th	26th	10th	—	—N/a
(Germany) 2012 Ruhpolding	6th	25th	29th	12th	9th	8th	—N/a
(Czech Republic) 2013 Nové Město	30th	51st	DNS	—	6th	—	—N/a
(Finland) 2015 Kontiolahti	14th	7th	4th	5th	6th	Gold	—N/a
(Norway) 2016 Oslo Holmenkollen	20th	15th	12th	17th	5th	6th	—N/a
(Austria) 2017 Hochfilzen	18th	42nd	30th	13th	10th	—	—N/a
(Sweden) 2019 Östersund	35th	—	—	—	4th	—	—
(Italy) 2020 Antholz-Anterselva	89th	—	—	—	13th	—	—

*During Olympic seasons competitions are only held for those events not included in the Olympic program.
**The mixed relay was added as an event in 2005, with the single mixed relay being added in 2019.

=== Individual victories ===
1 victory (1 MS)

Season	Date	Location	Discipline	Level
2007–08; 1 victory (1 MS)	16 March 2008	(Norway) Oslo Holmenkollen	15 km mass start	Biathlon World Cup

*Results are from UIPMB and IBU races which include the Biathlon World Cup, Biathlon World Championships and the Winter Olympic Games.
