= Andriy Deryzemlya =

Ukrainian biathlete (born 1977)

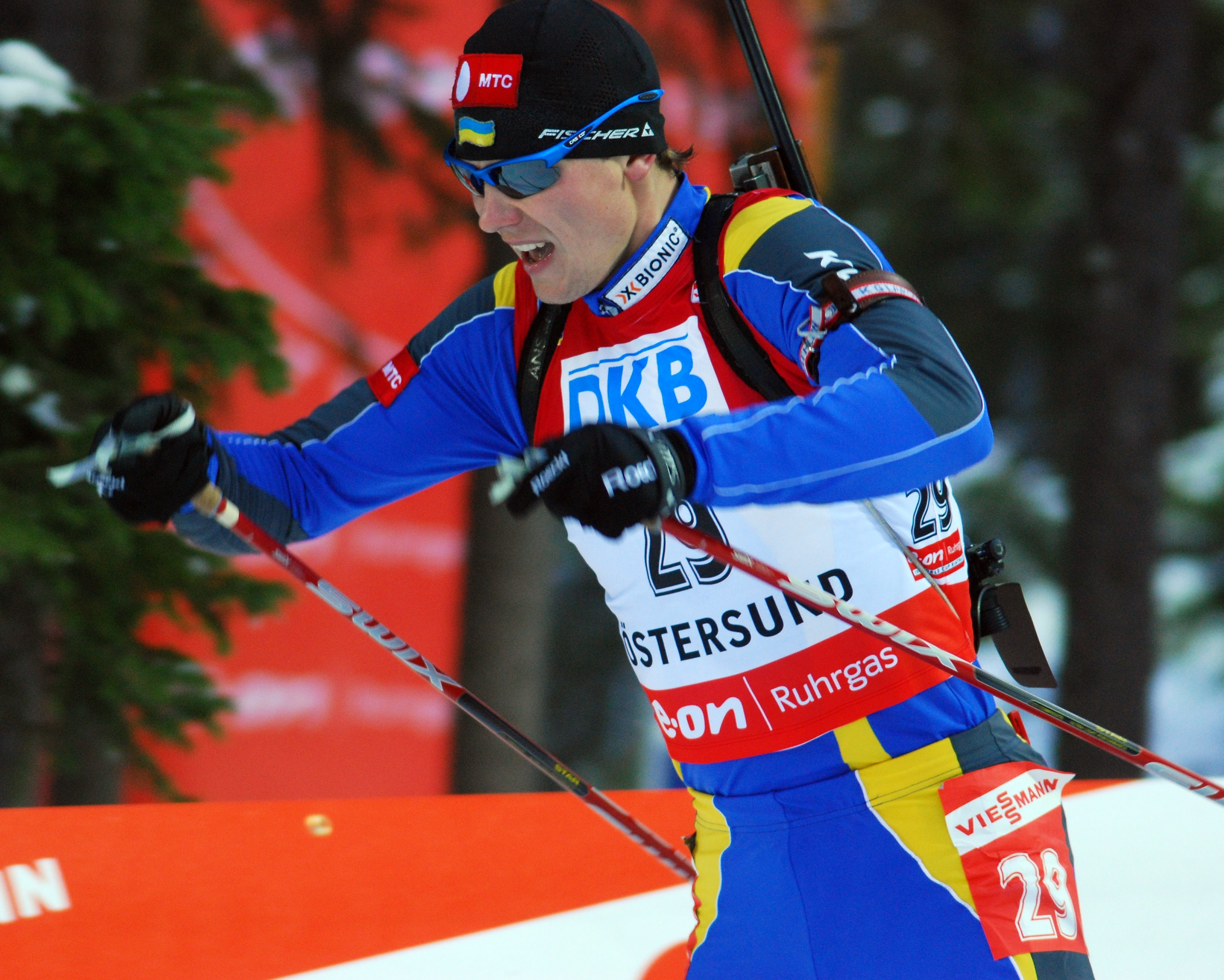
- Deryzemlya at the World Championships in 2008.

Personal information
- Full name: Andriy Vasylovych Deryzemlya
- Born: 18 August 1977 (age 48) Zhovtneve, Sumy Oblast, Ukrainian SSR, Soviet Union
- Height: 1.88 m (6 ft 2 in)

Sport

Professional information
- Sport: Biathlon
- World Cup debut: 7 December 1996

Olympic Games
- Teams: 5 (1998, 2002, 2006, 2010, 2014)
- Medals: 0

World Championships
- Teams: 17 (1997, 1998, 1999, 2000, 2001, 2002, 2003, 2004, 2005, 2006, 2007, 2008, 2009, 2010, 2011, 2012, 2013)
- Medals: 2 (0 gold)

World Cup
- Seasons: 18 (1996/97–2013/14)
- Individual victories: 1
- All victories: 1
- Individual podiums: 8 (1 gold, 1 silver, 6 bronze)
- All podiums: 13 (1 gold, 3 silver, 9 bronze)
Medal record
Men's biathlon
Representing Ukraine
World Championships
Silver medal – second place	2011 Khanty-Mansiysk	4 × 7.5 km relay
Bronze medal – third place	2007 Antholz-Anterselva	10 km sprint
European Championships
Gold medal – first place	2002 Kontiolahti	20 km individual
Gold medal – first place	2003 Forni Avoltri	12.5 km pursuit
Gold medal – first place	2005 Novosibirsk	12.5 km pursuit
Silver medal – second place	2005 Novosibirsk	10 km sprint
Silver medal – second place	2005 Novosibirsk	4 × 7.5 km relay
Silver medal – second place	2006 Langdorf	4 × 7.5 km relay
Winter Universiade
Gold medal – first place	2003 Tarvisio	10 km sprint
Gold medal – first place	2003 Tarvisio	15 km mass start
Silver medal – second place	2005 Innsbruck	12.5 km pursuit
Silver medal – second place	2005 Innsbruck	Relay
Bronze medal – third place	2003 Tarvisio	12.5 km pursuit

Andriy Vasylovych Deryzemlya (Ukrainian: Андрій Васильович Дериземля; born 18 August 1977) is a former Ukrainian biathlete who competed at the top level for eleven seasons before winning his first international medal, a bronze medal at the 2007 World Championship. In 2008 together with Oksana Khvostenko he won World Team Challenge.

Deryzemlya retired from the sport after the end of the 2013–14 season, starting a political career. In the 2014 parliamentary election Deryzemlya took part at the single-mandate district No. 205 in Chernihiv Oblast and failed them having finished second with 14.1% of votes. Before that he had founded the Centre for Support of Army in August 2014. On 29 November 2014, Deryzemlya donated his own plot of land in the city of Chernihiv so that it could be given instead to the family of a Ukrainian soldier who had been killed in the war in Donbas.

== Biathlon results ==
All results are sourced from the International Biathlon Union.

=== Olympic Games ===
Event	Individual	Sprint	Pursuit	Mass start	Relay	Mixed relay
(Japan) 1998 Nagano	—	45th	—N/a	—N/a	18th	—N/a
(United States) 2002 Salt Lake City	27th	38th	DNS	—N/a	—	—N/a
(Italy) 2006 Turin	39th	27th	31st	—	7th	—N/a
(Canada) 2010 Vancouver	27th	5th	26th	26th	8th	—N/a
(Russia) 2014 Sochi	46th	22nd	36th	—	9th	7th

*Pursuit was added as an event in 2002, with mass start being added in 2006 and the mixed relay in 2014.

=== World Championships ===
2 medals (1 silver, 1 bronze)

Event	Individual	Sprint	Pursuit	Mass start	Team	Relay	Mixed relay
(Slovakia) 1997 Brezno-Osrblie	—	77th	—	—N/a	—	—	—N/a
(Slovenia) 1998 Pokljuka	—N/a	—N/a	—	—N/a	15th	—N/a	—N/a
(Finland) 1999 Kontiolahti	33rd	65th	—	—	—N/a	11th	—N/a
(Norway) 2000 Oslo Holmenkollen	30th	44th	49th	—	—N/a	8th	—N/a
(Slovenia) 2001 Pokljuka	61st	22nd	23rd	—	—N/a	—	—N/a
(Norway) 2002 Oslo Holmenkollen	—N/a	—N/a	—N/a	30th	—N/a	—N/a	—N/a
(Russia) 2003 Khanty-Mansiysk	54th	23rd	15th	—	—N/a	10th	—N/a
(Germany) 2004 Oberhof	77th	58th	DNS	—	—N/a	—	—N/a
(Austria) 2005 Hochfilzen	40th	11th	8th	6th	—N/a	10th	7th
(Slovenia) 2006 Pokljuka	—N/a	—N/a	—N/a	—N/a	—N/a	—N/a	9th
(Italy) 2007 Antholz-Anterselva	—	Bronze	26th	25th	—N/a	8th	10th
(Sweden) 2008 Östersund	9th	29th	36th	10th	—N/a	10th	—
(South Korea) 2009 Pyeongchang	8th	12th	7th	23rd	—N/a	5th	11th
(Russia) 2010 Khanty-Mansiysk	—N/a	—N/a	—N/a	—N/a	—N/a	—N/a	6th
(Russia) 2011 Khanty-Mansiysk	14th	10th	7th	13th	—N/a	Silver	—
(Germany) 2012 Ruhpolding	17th	42nd	22nd	19th	—N/a	8th	14th
(Czech Republic) 2013 Nové Město	17th	17th	30th	20th	—N/a	14th	9th

*During Olympic seasons competitions are only held for those events not included in the Olympic program.
**Team was removed as an event in 1998, and mass start was added in 1999 with the mixed relay being added in 2005.

=== Individual victories ===
1 victory (1 MS)

Season	Date	Location	Discipline	Level
2002–03; 1 victory (1 MS)	26 January 2003	(Italy) Antholz-Anterselva	15 km mass start	Biathlon World Cup

*Results are from UIPMB and IBU races which include the Biathlon World Cup, Biathlon World Championships and the Winter Olympic Games.

Olympic Games
Preceded by Viktor Petrenko	Flagbearer for Ukraine; Nagano 1998	Succeeded by Olena Petrova
