= Alexandr Syman =

Belarusian biathlete (born 1977)

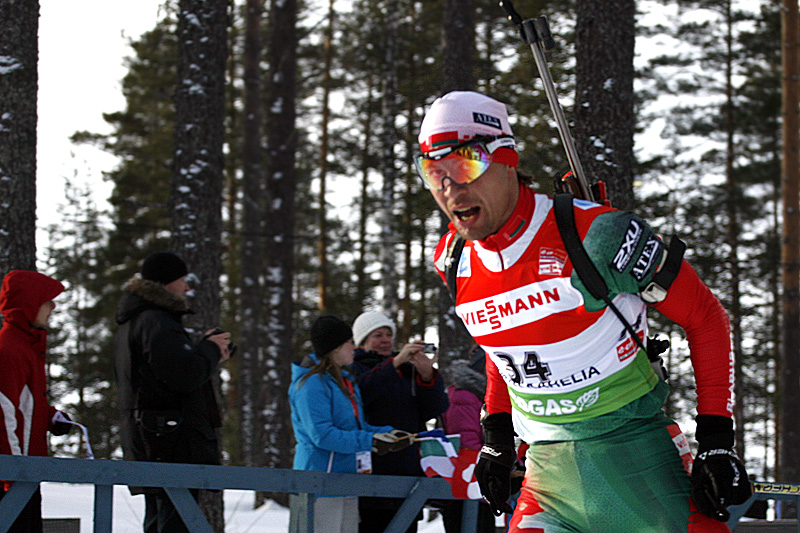
- Syman in 2010

Personal information
- Born: 26 July 1977 (age 48) Kapyl, Byelorussian SSR, Soviet Union

Sport
- Sport: Skiing
Medal record
Men's biathlon
Representing Belarus
World Championships
Silver medal – second place	2001 Pokljuka	4 × 7.5 km relay

Alexandr Syman (born 26 July 1977) is a Belarusian retired biathlete.

He competed in the 2002, 2006 and 2010 Winter Olympics for Belarus. His best finish was 8th, as a member of the Belarusian relay team in 2002. His best individual performance was 20th, in the 2010 sprint.

He earned one individual Biathlon World Cup victory, in the sprint event at Pokljuka in 2004/05. His best overall finish in the Biathlon World Cup also came in this season, placing 35th. He also earned a victory with the Belarusian relay team in 2003/04, as well as six other World Cup podiums. He won a silver medal at the Biathlon World Championships with the relay team as well, in 2001. His best individual performance in a World Championships was 21st, in the 2008 individual.

== World Cup podiums ==
Season	Location	Event	Rank
2000–01	Ruhpolding	Relay	3rd place, bronze medalist(s)
2001–02	Hochfilzen	Relay	3rd place, bronze medalist(s)
2001–02	Pokljuka	Relay	2nd place, silver medalist(s)
2001–02	Lahti	Relay	3rd place, bronze medalist(s)
2003–04	Hochfilzen	Relay	2nd place, silver medalist(s)
2003–04	Ruhpolding	Relay	1st place, gold medalist(s)
2004–05	Turin	Sprint	3rd place, bronze medalist(s)
2004–05	Pokljuka	Sprint	1st place, gold medalist(s)
