= Aleksandar Milenković =

Serbian cyclist, biathlete, and cross-country skier

Personal information
- Full name: Aleksandar Milenković
- Born: 22 December 1967 (age 58) Belgrade, SR Serbia, SFR Yugoslavia
- Height: 1.93 m (6 ft 4 in)
- Weight: 83 kg (183 lb)

Cycling career
- Sport: Cycling
- Current team: retired
- Discipline: Road
- Role: Rider

Aleksandar Milenković (Serbian Cyrillic: Александар Миленковић, born 22 December 1967) is a Serbian cyclist, biathlete and cross-country skier. Milenković has competed at two Winter and one Summer Olympic Games representing Yugoslavia, Independent Olympic Participants and Serbia and Montenegro.

== Olympic career ==
=== 1992 Winter Olympics ===
At the 1992 Winter Olympics, Milenković represented Socialist Federal Republic of Yugoslavia and competed in cross-country skiing.

- 10 kilometres - 87th
- 30 kilometres - 80th
- 50 kilometres - 65th
- 10/15 kilometres Pursuit - 75th

=== 1992 Summer Olympics ===
At the 1992 Summer Olympics, Milenković competed as Independent Olympic Participant in cycling.

- Road Race - 42nd
- 100 kilometres Team Time Trial - 18th

=== 2006 Winter Olympics ===
At the 2006 Winter Olympics, Milenković represented Serbia and Montenegro and competed in biathlon and cross-country skiing.

==== Biathlon ====
- 10 kilometres Sprint - 85th
- 20 kilometres - 85th

==== Cross-country skiing ====
- Men's 50 kilometres - DNF
