= Simon Hallenbarter =

Swiss biathlete (1979–2022)

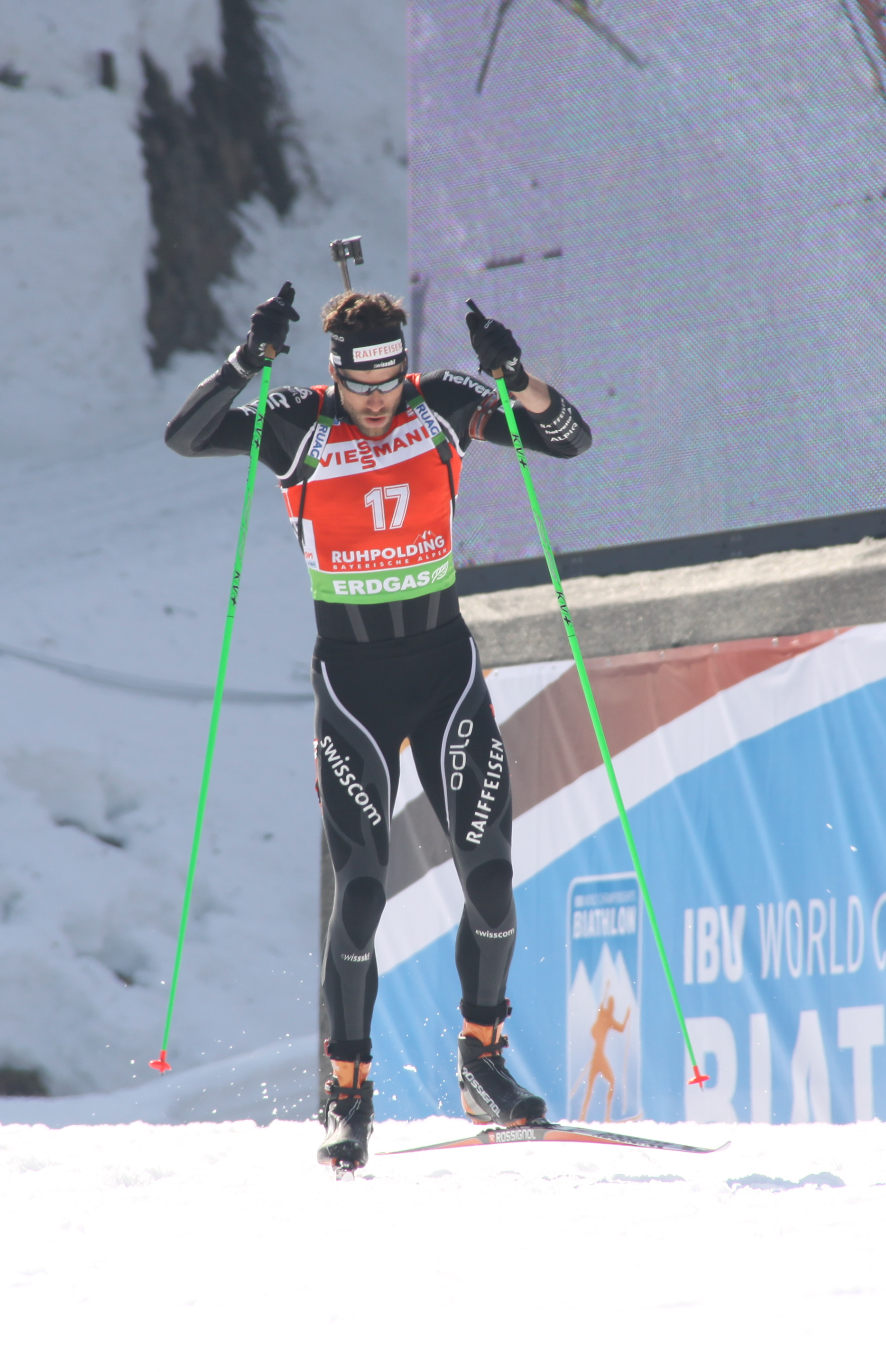
- Simon Hallenbarter during IBU World Cup competitions in Ruhpolding, Bavaria, Germany in March 2012

Personal information
- Born: 5 March 1979 Obergesteln, Valais, Switzerland
- Died: 3 October 2022 (aged 43) Silbertal, Austria
- Height: 1.93 m (6 ft 4 in)

Sport
- Sport: Skiing

World Cup career
- Indiv. wins: 0

Simon Hallenbarter (5 March 1979 – 3 October 2022) was a Swiss biathlete. He represented Switzerland at two Olympics – 2006 Winter Olympics and 2010 Winter Olympics. Hallenbarter finished 16th in the men's 10 kilometres sprint at the 2010 Olympics. He started to compete in biathlon in 2002.

Hallenbarter retired from the sport at the end of the 2013–14 season.
