= René-Laurent Vuillermoz =

Italian biathlete (born 1977)

Personal information
- Born: 26 October 1977 Aosta, Italy

Sport
- Sport: Skiing
- Updated on 28 February 2013

René-Laurent Vuillermoz (born in Aosta on 26 October 1977) is a retired Italian biathlete.

He competed in the 2002, 2006 and 2010 Winter Olympics for Italy. His best finish was 8th, as a member of the Italian relay team in 2006. His best individual performance was 13th, in the 2006 pursuit.

His best finish at a Biathlon World Championships was 4th, in the 2007 relay. His best individual performance was 9th, in the sprint of the same year.

Vuillermoz earned five Biathlon World Cup medals, including two individual medals. He won two silvers: in the mixed relay at Pyeongchang in 2007/08 and the men's relay in Antholz from 2011/12. He also won two individual bronze medals, from sprint races at Ruhpolding in 2004/05 and Oberhof in 2006/07 His best overall finish in the Biathlon World Cup was 27th, in 2005/06.

== World Cup podiums ==
Season	Location	Event	Rank
2002/03	Antholz	Relay	3rd place, bronze medalist(s)
2004/05	Ruhpolding	Sprint	3rd place, bronze medalist(s)
2006/07	Oberhof	Sprint	3rd place, bronze medalist(s)
2007/08	Pyeongchang	Mixed Relay	2nd place, silver medalist(s)
2010/11	Antholz	Relay	2nd place, silver medalist(s)
