= David Leoni =

Canadian biathlete (born 1982)

David Leoni (born September 8, 1982 in Liverpool, United Kingdom) is an Olympic Games biathlete for Team Canada, who lives in Jasper, Alberta. He is also a six-time Canadian Junior Champion, and three time North American Champion.
