= Jay Hakkinen =

American biathlete (born 1977)

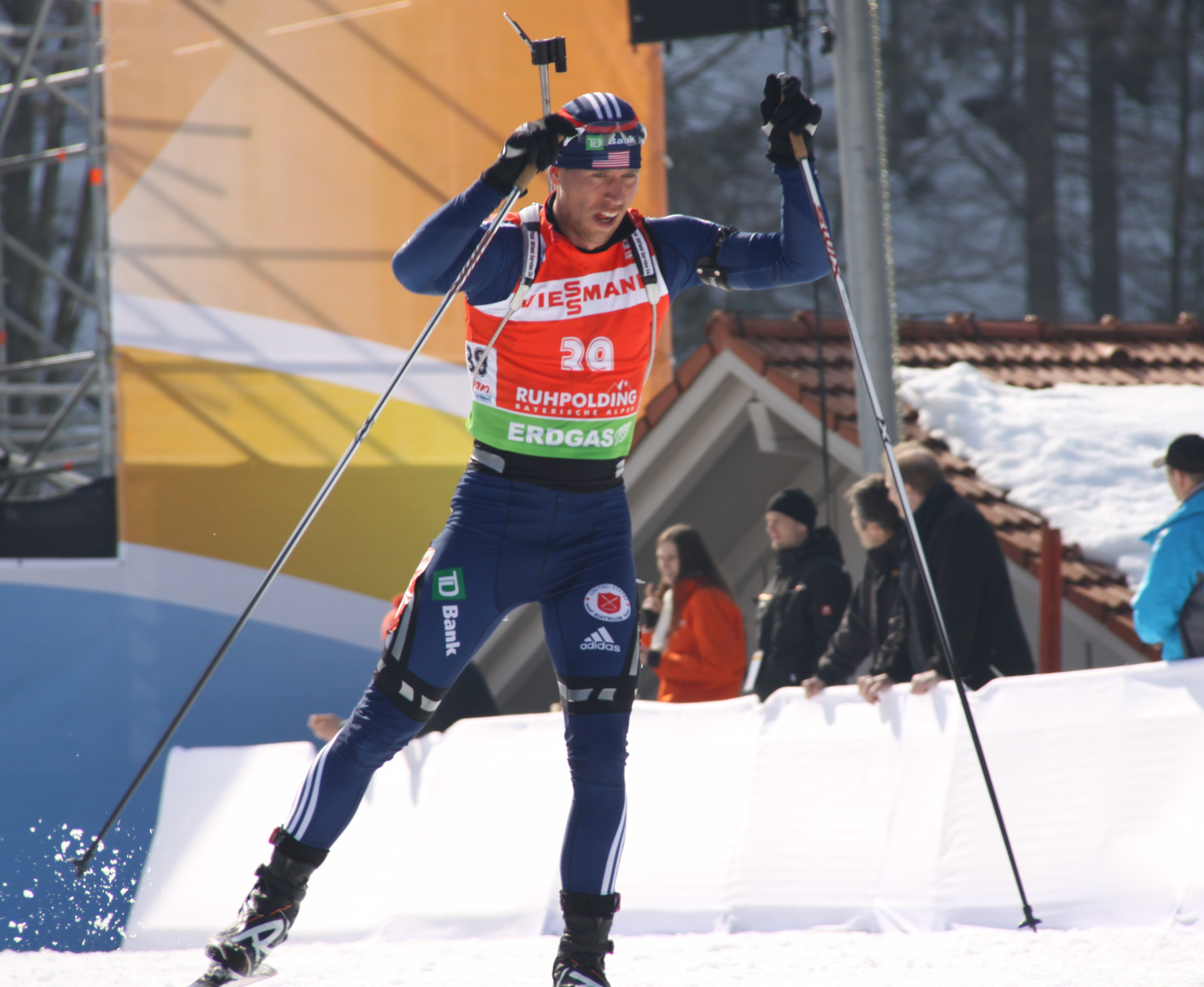
- Jay Hakkinen in 2012

Personal information
- Full name: Jay William Hakkinen
- Born: July 19, 1977 (age 49) Kasilof, Alaska, United States
- Height: 1.83 m (6 ft 0 in)

Sport

Professional information
- Sport: Biathlon
- World Cup debut: March 11, 1995

Olympic Games
- Teams: 4 (1998, 2002, 2006, 2010)
- Medals: 0

World Championships
- Teams: 14 (1997, 1998, 1999, 2000, 2001, 2003, 2004, 2005, 2006, 2007, 2008, 2009, 2011, 2012)
- Medals: 0

World Cup
- Seasons: 18 (1994/95, 1996/97–2012/13)
- All victories: 0
- All podiums: 0
Medal record
Men's biathlon
Representing United States
Junior World Championships
Gold medal – first place	1997 Forni Avoltri	10 km sprint

Jay William Hakkinen (born July 19, 1977) is a former biathlete. He is a four-time American Olympian, and his 10th-place finish in the 20-kilometer individual race at the 2006 Winter Olympics in Turin, Italy was the best finish ever by an American biathlete.

Hakkinen retired from the sport at the end of the 2013–14 season.

== Background ==
At the age of three, Hakkinen learned how to skate. Soon after, he picked up cross-country skiing, where he won the Junior 5 km freestyle. He got involved in biathlon when in 1994, he went for a year to a Norwegian town in a student exchange program. His host parents were able to arrange for him to trade with a local biathlon club. Within three years of returning home to Alaska, he was the Junior World Champion of biathlon.

== Performance in Turin ==
Hakkinen placed 10th in the 20-kilometer individual race at the 2006 Winter Olympics in Turin, Italy. He had the 2nd fastest skiing time of anyone in the competition, but failed to medal because of penalties he earned while shooting. He vowed to medal in his next event, but instead missed all five targets and fell quickly out of contention. Hakkinen was the lead biathlete for the United States in the relay, and was in first place when he handed off to his teammate; ultimately, however, the United States finished in 9th in the relay.

== Biathlon results ==
All results are sourced from the International Biathlon Union.

=== Olympic Games ===
Event	Individual	Sprint	Pursuit	Mass start	Relay
(Japan) 1998 Nagano	42nd	60th	—N/a	—N/a	17th
(United States) 2002 Salt Lake City	26th	26th	13th	—N/a	15th
(Italy) 2006 Turin	10th	78th	—	13th	9th
(Canada) 2010 Vancouver	76th	54th	57th	—	13th

*Pursuit was added as an event in 2002, with mass start being added in 2006.

=== World Championships ===
Event	Individual	Sprint	Pursuit	Mass start	Team	Relay	Mixed relay
(Slovakia) 1997 Brezno-Osrblie	37th	—	—	—N/a	14th	20th	—N/a
(Slovenia) 1998 Pokljuka	—N/a	—N/a	39th	—N/a	10th	—N/a	—N/a
(Finland) 1999 Kontiolahti	48th	16th	24th	18th	—N/a	18th	—N/a
(Norway) 2000 Oslo Holmenkollen	31st	32nd	30th	—	—N/a	16th	—N/a
(Slovenia) 2001 Pokljuka	39th	31st	41st	—	—N/a	—	—N/a
(Russia) 2003 Khanty-Mansiysk	—	47th	51st	—	—N/a	17th	—N/a
(Germany) 2004 Oberhof	70th	47th	LAP	—	—N/a	18th	—N/a
(Austria) 2005 Hochfilzen	69th	18th	23rd	—	—N/a	—	DNS
(Slovenia) 2006 Pokljuka	—N/a	—N/a	—N/a	—N/a	—N/a	—N/a	18th
(Italy) 2007 Antholz-Anterselva	31st	38th	18th	9th	—N/a	9th	—
(Sweden) 2008 Östersund	—	89th	—	—	—N/a	15th	—
(South Korea) 2009 Pyeongchang	DNF	—	—	—	—N/a	—	—
(Russia) 2011 Khanty-Mansiysk	80th	42nd	35th	—	—N/a	6th	13th
(Germany) 2012 Ruhpolding	31st	91st	—	—	—N/a	10th	—

*During Olympic seasons competitions are only held for those events not included in the Olympic program.
**Team was removed as an event in 1998, and mass start was added in 1999 with the mixed relay being added in 2005.
