= Matthias Simmen =

Swiss biathlete (born 1972)

Personal information
- Full name: Matthias Simmen
- Born: February 3, 1972 (age 54) Altdorf, Uri, Switzerland
- Height: 1.86 m (6 ft 1 in)

Sport
- Sport: Skiing
- Updated on February 27, 2013

Matthias Simmen (born in Altdorf, Uri on February 3, 1972) is a retired Swiss biathlete.

He competed in the 2002, 2006 and 2010 Winter Olympics for Switzerland. His best finish was 9th, as a member of the Swiss relay team in 2010. His best individual performance was 23rd, in the 2006 pursuit.

He earned one Biathlon World Cup podium finish, 3rd in the sprint event in the 2006/07 event at Hochfilzen. That was the first podium finish ever for a Swiss biathlete. His best finish at the Biathlon World Championships was 10th, in 2007. His best overall finish in the Biathlon World Cup came in 2006/07, when he placed 29th.

Simmen retired after the 2010–11 season.

== World Cup podiums ==
Date	Location	Event	Rank
December 8, 2006	Hochfilzen	Pursuit	3rd place, bronze medalist(s)
