= Christian De Lorenzi =

Italian biathlete

Personal information
- Full name: Christian De Lorenzi
- Nickname: Jap
- Born: 18 February 1981 (age 45) Sondalo, Lombardy, Italy
- Height: 1.73 m (5 ft 8 in)

Sport

Professional information
- Sport: Biathlon
- World Cup debut: 20 December 2002
- Retired: 26 March 2016

Olympic Games
- Teams: 3 (2006, 2010, 2014)
- Medals: 0

World Championships
- Teams: 11 (2004, 2005, 2007, 2008, 2009, 2010, 2011, 2012, 2013, 2015, 2016)
- Medals: 0

World Cup
- Seasons: 14 (2002/03–2015/16)
- Individual victories: 0
- All victories: 1
- Individual podiums: 2
- All podiums: 6
Medal record
Men's biathlon
Representing Italy
Junior European Championships
Silver medal – second place	2001 Haute Maurienne	10 km sprint

Christian De Lorenzi (born 18 February 1981) is a former Italian biathlete.

De Lorenzi represented Italy at 2006, 2010 and 2014 Winter Olympics. He debuted in the Biathlon World Cup in 2002. His best World Cup overall finish was 23rd in the 2010–11 season. He retired after the 2015–16 season, his last competitions being the Italian Championships.

== Biathlon results ==
All results are sourced from the International Biathlon Union.

=== Olympic Games ===
Event	Individual	Sprint	Pursuit	Mass start	Relay	Mixed relay
(Italy) 2006 Turin	7th	26th	14th	26th	8th	—N/a
(Canada) 2010 Vancouver	38th	61st	—	—	12th	—N/a
(Russia) 2014 Sochi	30th	46th	42nd	—	5th	—

*The mixed relay was added as an event in 2014.

=== World Championships ===
Event	Individual	Sprint	Pursuit	Mass start	Relay	Mixed relay
(Germany) 2004 Oberhof	DNF	57th	LAP	—	15th	—N/a
(Austria) 2005 Hochfilzen	13th	58th	45th	—	9th	—
(Italy) 2007 Antholz-Anterselva	26th	11th	44th	28th	4th	—
(Sweden) 2008 Östersund	6th	21st	14th	30th	11th	5th
(South Korea) 2009 Pyeongchang	43rd	27th	12th	10th	7th	7th
(Russia) 2010 Khanty-Mansiysk	—N/a	—N/a	—N/a	—N/a	—N/a	8th
(Russia) 2011 Khanty-Mansiysk	33rd	21st	23rd	23rd	5th	5th
(Germany) 2012 Ruhpolding	32nd	60th	37th	—	4th	—
(Czech Republic) 2013 Nové Město	54th	26th	25th	—	7th	—
(Finland) 2015 Kontiolahti	12th	25th	21st	18th	12th	—
(Norway) 2016 Oslo Holmenkollen	82nd	41st	54th	—	11th	—

*During Olympic seasons competitions are only held for those events not included in the Olympic program.
**The mixed relay was added as an event in 2005.

Further notable results

- 2004:
  - 2nd, Italian championships of biathlon
  - 2nd, Italian championships of biathlon, sprint
- 2005: 2nd, Italian championships of biathlon, pursuit
- 2006: 3rd, Italian championships of biathlon, pursuit
- 2007:
  - 1st, Italian championships of biathlon, sprint
  - 1st, Italian championships of biathlon, pursuit
  - 2nd, Italian championships of biathlon, pursuit
- 2008: 1st, Italian championships of biathlon, sprint
- 2010:
  - 1st, Italian championships of biathlon, sprint
  - 1st, Italian championships of biathlon, pursuit
- 2011: 2nd, Italian championships of biathlon, pursuit
