= Robin Clegg =

Canadian biathlete (born 1977)

Robin Clegg (born August 11, 1977) is a Canadian former biathlete.

Born in Edmonton, Alberta, Clegg lives in Canmore, Alberta. He was a gold medalist at the 2005 North American Championships.

He retired after the 2009–10 season.

Robin Clegg was inducted into the NWT Sport Hall of Fame in 2014.
