= Wiesław Ziemianin =

Polish biathlete (born 1970)

Personal information
- Nationality: Polish
- Born: 7 September 1970 (age 54); Rabka-Zdrój, Poland

Sport
- Sport: Biathlon

Wiesław Ziemianin (born 7 September 1970) is a Polish biathlete. He competed at the 1994, 1998, 2002 and the 2006 Winter Olympics.
