= Janez Marič =

Slovenian biathlete (born 1975)

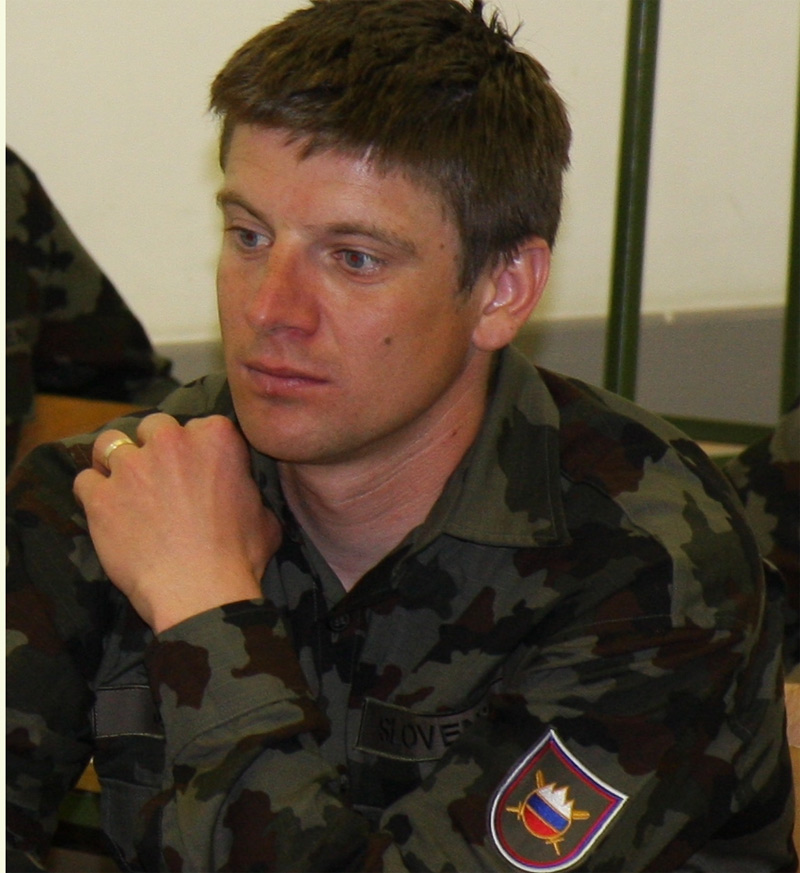
- Janez Marič in military uniform

Personal information
- Born: August 10, 1975 (age 50)
- Height: 6 ft 0 in (183 cm)
- Weight: 176 lb (80 kg)

Sport
- Country: Slovenia
- Sport: Biathlon
Medal record
Representing Slovenia

Janez Marič (born August 10, 1975 in Ribno, Yugoslavia) is a Slovenian former biathlete.

Marič represented Slovenia at the 2002, 2006, 2010 and 2014 Winter Olympics.

He retired after the 2014–15 season.
