= Sergey Novikov (biathlete) =

Belarusian biathlete (born 1979)

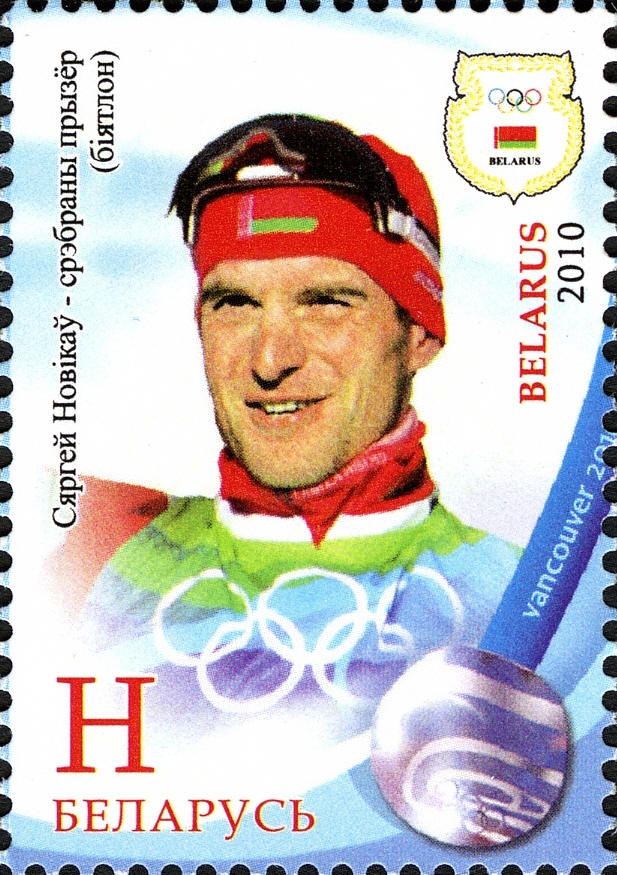
- Sergei Novikov on a 2010 Belarusian stamp

Personal information
- Born: 27 April 1979 (age 47) Chavusy, Byelorussian SSR, Soviet Union
- Height: 1.84 m (6 ft 0 in)
- Weight: 75 kg (165 lb)

Sport
- Country: Belarus
- Sport: Biathlon
- Club: Dynamo Mahilyow; Dynamo Minsk
Medal record
Men's biathlon
Representing Belarus
Olympic Games
Silver medal – second place	2010 Vancouver	20 km individual
World Championships
Silver medal – second place	2008 Östersund	Mixed relay
European Championships
Gold medal – first place	2006 Langdorf	12.5 km pursuit
Gold medal – first place	2006 Langdorf	4 × 7.5 km relay
Silver medal – second place	2006 Langdorf	10 km sprint
Bronze medal – third place	1999 Izhevsk	4 × 7.5 km relay
Bronze medal – third place	2007 Bansko	4 × 7.5 km relay

Sergey Valentinovich Novikov (Russian: Серге́й Валентинович Новиков, Belarusian: Сяргей Валянцінавіч Новікаў – Siarhei Valiancinavich Novikau; born 27 April 1979) is a retired Belarusian biathlete. He competed at the 2006, 2010 and 2014 Olympics in four-five events at each Games: 10 km sprint, 12.5 km pursuit, 15 km mass start, 20 km race and 4 × 7.5 km relay. He won a silver medal, shared with Ole Einar Bjørndalen, in the 20 km individual race in 2010.

Novikov retired from the sport at the end of the 2013–14 season.
