= 2008–09 Biathlon World Cup – Overall Men =

== 2007-08 Top 3 Standings ==
Medal	Athlete	Points
Gold:	(Norway) Ole Einar Bjørndalen	869
Silver:	(Russia) Dmitri Yaroshenko	696
Bronze:	(Norway) Emil Hegle Svendsen	687

== Medal winners ==
Event:	Gold:	Time	Silver:	Time	Bronze:	Time
Östersund; 20 km Individual details	Michael Greis; Germany	58:52.5 (0+1+0+0)	Alexander Os; Norway	59:43.0 (0+0+0+2)	Emil Hegle Svendsen; Norway	59:47.5 (0+2+0+0)
Östersund; 10 km Sprint details	Emil Hegle Svendsen; Norway	25:42.3 (0+1)	Tomasz Sikora; Poland	25:55.0 (0+1)	Simon Fourcade; France	26:10.4 (0+0)
Östersund; 12.5 km Pursuit details	Tomasz Sikora; Poland	34:55.5 (0+2+0+1)	Ole Einar Bjørndalen; Norway	34:58.0 (1+2+0+0)	Emil Hegle Svendsen; Norway	35:00.4 (0+1+2+0)
Hochfilzen; 10 km Sprint details	Emil Hegle Svendsen; Norway	26:08.1 (0+0)	Ivan Tcherezov; Russia	26:34.4 (0+1)	Alexander Os; Norway	26:41.0 (1+0)
Hochfilzen; 12.5 km Pursuit details	Emil Hegle Svendsen; Norway	35:46.3 (1+0+1+1)	Ole Einar Bjørndalen; Norway	35:55.7 (0+0+2+0)	Tomasz Sikora; Poland	35:58.35 (1+0+0+2)
Hochfilzen; 20 km Individual details	Maxim Tchoudov; Russia	56:00.3 (0+1+0+0)	Ivan Tcherezov; Russia	56:47.9 (0+0+2+0)	Björn Ferry; Sweden	56:48.8 (0+0+1+0)
Hochfilzen; 10 km Sprint details	Lars Berger; Norway	25:23.1 (0+0)	Alexander Os; Norway	26:01.0 (0+1)	Carl Johan Bergman; Sweden	26:14.7 (0+1)
Oberhof; 10 km Sprint details	Maxim Tchoudov; Russia	25:49.5 (0+0)	Michael Rösch; Germany	26:02.2 (0+0)	Tomasz Sikora; Poland	26:14.7 (1+0)
Oberhof; 15 km Mass start details	Christoph Sumann; Austria	38:11.9 (1+0+1+0)	Carl Johan Bergman; Sweden	38:21.6 (0+0+1+1)	Ole Einar Bjørndalen; Norway	38:21.8 (0+1+1+0)
Ruhpolding; 10 km Sprint Men details	Ole Einar Bjørndalen; Norway	23:25.8 (0+0)	Dominik Landertinger; Austria	23:59.2 (0+0)	Emil Hegle Svendsen; Norway	24:01.1 (0+1)
Ruhpolding; 12.5 km Pursuit details	Ole Einar Bjørndalen; Norway	36:17.4 (0+1+0+0)	Emil Hegle Svendsen; Norway	36:51.8 (1+0+0+0)	Dominik Landertinger; Austria	37:03.9 (1+1+0+0)
Antholz; 10 km Sprint Men details	Emil Hegle Svendsen; Norway	24:52.5 (0+0)	Björn Ferry; Sweden	24:56.1 (0+0)	Tomasz Sikora; Poland	24:59.2 (0+0)
Antholz; 12.5 km Pursuit details	Björn Ferry; Sweden	33:19.4 (0+0+1+0)	Simon Eder; Austria	33:37.0 (0+0+0+0)	Emil Hegle Svendsen; Norway	33:44.1 (1+0+1+1)
Antholz; 15 km Mass start details	Christoph Stephan; Germany	37:19.9 (0+0+0+1)	Dominik Landertinger; Austria	37:20.1 (1+2+0+0)	Ivan Tcherezov; Russia	37:22.7 (0+0+1+1)
World Championships; 10 km Sprint details	Ole Einar Bjørndalen; Norway	24:16.5 (1+1)	Lars Berger; Norway	24:17.7 (1+1)	Halvard Hanevold; Norway	24:29.0 (0+0)
World Championships; 12.5 km Pursuit details	Ole Einar Bjørndalen; Norway	31:46.70 (0+2+0+2)	Maxim Tchoudov; Russia	32:28.40 (0+0+1+2)	Alexander Os; Norway	32:39.50 (0+0+2+1)
World Championships; 20 km Individual details	Ole Einar Bjørndalen; Norway	52:28.0 (0+0+2+1)	Christoph Stephan; Germany	52:42.1 (1+0+0+0)	Jakov Fak; Croatia	52:45.1 (0+0+0+1)
World Championships; 15 km Mass start details	Dominik Landertinger; Austria	38:32.5 (2+0+0+1)	Christoph Sumann; Austria	38:41.4 (2+0+0+1)	Ivan Tcherezov; Russia	38:46.4 (2+0+0+0)
Vancouver; 20 km Individual details	Vincent Jay; France	49:53.9 (0+0+0+0)	Daniel Böhm; Germany	50:12.9 (0+1+0+0)	Jeremy Teela; United States	50:17.2 (0+1+0+0)
Vancouver; 10 km Sprint Men details	Lars Berger; Norway	24:06.5 (0+0)	Ole Einar Bjørndalen; Norway	24:20.6 (0+0)	Christoph Sumann; Austria	24:46.0 (0+0)
Trondheim; 10 km Sprint Men details	Michael Greis; Germany	26:11.3 (0+0)	Ole Einar Bjørndalen; Norway	26:29.6 (1+0)	Simon Eder; Austria	26:43.1 (0+0)
Trondheim; 12.5 km Pursuit details	Ole Einar Bjørndalen; Norway	33:36.3 (1+0+1+0)	Simon Eder; Austria	34:01.4 (0+0+1+0)	Tomasz Sikora; Poland	34:01.6 (0+1+1+0)
Trondheim; 15 km Mass start details	Ole Einar Bjørndalen; Norway	41:12.9 (0+0+0+0)	Simon Eder; Austria	41:52.0 (0+0+1+0)	Emil Hegle Svendsen; Norway	42:06.3 (1+0+0+1)
Khanty-Mansiysk; 10 km Sprint details	Arnd Peiffer; Germany	25:51.1 (0+0)	Ole Einar Bjørndalen; Norway	26:14.2 (0+1)	Christoph Sumann; Austria	26:18.4 (0+0)
Khanty-Mansiysk; 12.5 km Pursuit details	Emil Hegle Svendsen; Norway	33:03.3 (0+0+1+1)	Ole Einar Bjørndalen; Norway	33:03.4 (1+0+0+1)	Christoph Sumann; Austria	33:27.1 (0+0+2+0)
Khanty-Mansiysk; 15 km Mass start details	Simon Eder; Austria	37:14.4 (0+0+0+0)	Dominik Landertinger; Austria	37:26.5 (0+0+0+1)	Ole Einar Bjørndalen; Norway	37:31.4 (2+0+0+1)

== Final standings ==
#	Name	ÖST IN	ÖST SP	ÖST PU	HOC SP	HOC PU	HOC IN	HOC SP	OBE SP	OBE MS	RUH SP	RUH PU	ANT SP	ANT PU	ANT MS	WCH SP	WCH PU	WCH IN	WCH MS	VAN IN	VAN SP	TRO SP	TRO PU	TRO MS	KHA SP	KHA PU	KHA MS	Total
1.	(Norway) Ole Einar Bjørndalen	17	43	54	29	54	27	–	18	48	60	60	–	–	40	60	60	60	43	23	54	54	60	60	54	54	48	1080
2	(Poland) Tomasz Sikora	29	54	60	43	48	~~22~~	36	48	28	29	34	48	43	36	~~25~~	43	32	38	30	26	28	48	25	~~23~~	32	32	870
3	(Norway) Emil Hegle Svendsen	48	60	48	60	60	24	–	17	43	48	54	60	48	–	–	–	–	29	–	–	30	38	48	43	60	26	844
4	(Germany) Michael Greis	60	27	43	34	36	43	40	–	–	1	27	36	38	24	36	28	22	~~0~~	43	36	60	43	34	36	43	14	804
5	(Russia) Maxim Tchoudov	28	~~16~~	29	36	27	60	~~8~~	60	40	31	21	28	26	38	40	54	31	36	26	~~14~~	43	17	28	29	29	23	780
6	(Austria) Christoph Sumann	34	5	9	32	32	38	38	~~2~~	60	30	32	38	32	43	~~0~~	–	24	54	28	48	22	6	18	48	48	40	759
7	(Russia) Ivan Tcherezov	30	34	23	54	~~2~~	54	32	–	–	23	40	25	34	48	3	15	36	48	22	34	38	29	43	15	19	31	730
8	(Sweden) Carl Johan Bergman	32	31	21	21	29	34	48	24	54	40	43	43	23	20	~~0~~	–	–	14	32	29	20	19	36	0	3	27	643
9	(Sweden) Björn Ferry	24	6	31	40	40	48	30	23	27	16	7	54	60	26	1	10	–	–	–	–	36	34	27	32	40	30	642
10	(Norway) Halvard Hanevold	36	30	38	23	20	3	23	16	34	21	–	40	24	15	48	38	~~0~~	28	6	15	29	36	14	27	~~0~~	36	600
11	(Austria) Dominik Landertinger	15	0	19	0	–	–	–	28	–	54	48	19	25	54	24	7	38	60	–	–	23	31	40	34	14	54	589
12	(Austria) Simon Eder	–	–	–	–	–	0	3	26	–	9	23	22	54	28	34	27	–	34	40	21	48	54	54	16	28	60	581
13	(Norway) Alexander Os	54	25	27	48	18	10	54	31	12	29	–	10	11	31	43	48	13	–	~~0~~	~~0~~	40	32	20	4	7	13	580
14	(Austria) Daniel Mesotitsch	40	21	25	19	~~8~~	36	28	~~0~~	25	17	13	30	28	34	12	17	21	16	~~0~~	32	17	12	26	28	27	29	553
15	(France) Simon Fourcade	0	48	40	11	0	–	34	0	29	15	29	14	22	29	38	31	43	32	4	43	~~0~~	–	15	0	21	38	536
16	(Germany) Michael Rösch	21	~~0~~	–	17	13	13	9	54	36	36	38	13	31	22	27	32	23	40	15	0	13	27	16	~~0~~	0	34	530
17	(Norway) Lars Berger	16	10	3	–	–	–	60	0	24	8	36	7	–	18	54	40	7	12	0	60	34	21	21	0	–	12	444
18	(Germany) Christoph Stephan	~~0~~	22	36	4	21	0	21	40	19	4	0	29	15	60	19	0	54	20	–	0	0	0	38	6	–	28	436
19	(Germany) Alexander Wolf	14	26	34	30	30	30	23	~~0~~	17	0	6	0	20	30	~~0~~	23	11	–	27	13	3	8	22	30	13	19	429
20	(Czech Republic) Michal Šlesingr	0	0	–	0	0	9	11	43	–	24	30	32	27	14	9	22	3	–	14	17	16	40	30	24	38	20	423
21	(Ukraine) Andriy Deryzemlya	38	0	12	7	24	0	25	7	38	–	–	0	–	27	29	36	34	18	10	4	0	–	23	0	–	25	357
22	(Austria) Friedrich Pinter	19	0	4	0	–	0	19	27	–	34	31	24	2	25	–	–	0	–	9	12	27	23	31	31	15	21	354
23	(Italy) Christian De Lorenzi	0	40	5	2	38	32	0	4	30	43	24	0	0	13	14	29	0	31	0	22	0	–	12	~~0~~	–	11	350
24	(France) Martin Fourcade	–	–	–	–	–	5	31	0	–	19	26	0	16	–	23	34	28	26	0	30	18	20	29	0	22	18	345
25	(United States) Tim Burke	–	0	–	–	–	0	0	20	–	0	–	26	30	–	30	20	27	13	18	0	32	28	17	18	34	17	330
26	(Italy) Markus Windisch	11	36	26	10	22	0	0	10	15	25	25	0	–	23	22	18	29	25	0	0	0	–	13	0	–	16	326
27	(Germany) Andreas Birnbacher	10	–	–	31	7	17	0	38	20	32	20	0	–	–	–	–	–	–	–	–	1	25	–	40	30	43	314
28	(Russia) Andrei Makoveev	22	20	0	12	6	~~0~~	11	31	31	0	1	0	0	–	17	24	–	17	0	7	25	14	19	26	6	22	311
29	(France) Vincent Jay	13	0	0	13	31	0	24	8	26	0	–	3	13	–	0	2	18	–	60	0	0	26	32	0	–	24	293
30	(Belarus) Rustam Valiullin	3	32	28	9	16	0	12	29	21	2	–	0	–	21	0	0	14	–	0	31	0	–	11	17	18	15	279
#	Name	ÖST IN	ÖST SP	ÖST PU	HOC SP	HOC PU	HOC IN	HOC SP	OBE SP	OBE MS	RUH SP	RUH PU	ANT SP	ANT PU	ANT MS	WCH SP	WCH PU	WCH IN	WCH MS	VAN IN	VAN SP	TRO SP	TRO PU	TRO MS	KHA SP	KHA PU	KHA MS	Total
31	(Russia) Nikolay Kruglov, Jr.	23	19	32	25	43	29	26	13	22	–	–	0	8	16	0	–	–	–	–	–	–	–	–	–	–	–	256
32	(Canada) Jean Philippe Leguellec	0	28	24	24	34	2	0	–	–	0	18	20	36	19	0	0	0	–	8	0	0	0	24	10	5	–	252
33	(Russia) Evgeny Ustyugov	–	–	–	–	–	–	–	0	–	13	19	34	19	–	0	21	0	–	25	27	13	15	–	25	36	–	247
34	(Sweden) Mattias Nilsson	0	0	0	38	19	0	0	9	–	0	0	4	0	–	15	14	15	21	29	23	0	24	–	0	17	–	228
35	(France) Vincent Defrasne	0	2	17	0	–	7	43	14	16	26	28	12	1	0	0	1	20	–	34	1	–	–	–	–	–	–	222
36	(Switzerland) Simon Hallenbarter	0	0	–	0	17	4	14	–	–	6	0	10	0	–	32	12	0	24	0	18	24	0	–	38	23	–	222
37	(Austria) Tobias Eberhard	0	0	–	3	10	0	29	32	–	0	9	31	21	32	–	–	–	–	0	16	14	4	–	21	0	–	222
38	(Germany) Arnd Peiffer	–	–	–	–	–	–	–	36	–	11	8	16	9	–	–	–	–	–	24	19	0	0	–	60	26	–	209
39	(Ukraine) Vyacheslav Derkach	31	14	15	0	–	8	17	0	14	–	–	21	14	–	0	0	–	–	16	10	0	5	–	19	20	–	205
40	(Norway) Ronny Hafsas	0	38	22	1	0	–	–	34	18	27	15	–	–	–	–	–	–	–	36	3	0	0	–	5	4	–	203
41	(Slovenia) Janez Maric	0	0	0	0	–	12	0	0	–	38	14	0	–	–	31	6	0	30	0	38	15	16	–	0	0	–	200
42	(Belarus) Sergey Novikov	0	13	20	22	5	12	15	0	32	–	–	0	0	–	10	0	16	–	20	2	6	9	–	0	0	–	182
43	(Czech Republic) Jaroslav Soukup	0	17	18	0	–	0	0	22	–	0	2	0	17	–	4	0	30	–	–	–	5	30	–	20	10	–	175
44	(Croatia) Jakov Fak	0	4	0	0	–	26	0	0	–	–	–	–	–	–	27	16	48	22	0	10	8	3	–	0	0	–	164
45	(United States) Jay Hakkinen	0	18	30	27	0	0	0	25	13	19	10	0	–	17	–	–	0	–	0	0	0	–	–	–	–	–	159
46	(Ukraine) Serguei Sednev	43	0	8	0	1	18	0	0	–	–	–	15	40	–	–	–	0	–	13	0	0	–	–	2	8	–	148
47	(Norway) Frode Andresen	25	24	6	0	–	–	–	–	–	14	11	–	–	–	–	–	–	–	38	25	0	–	–	–	–	–	143
48	(Czech Republic) Zdeněk Vítek	0	1	14	0	14	19	0	–	–	22	17	–	–	–	0	13	12	–	5	0	0	18	–	1	0	–	136
49	(Ukraine) Roman Pryma	0	15	0	20	0	40	16	0	23	–	–	0	0	–	13	8	0	–	0	0	0	–	–	0	–	–	135
50	(Slovenia) Klemen Bauer	–	0	–	0	–	0	0	5	–	0	–	17	0	–	28	30	0	27	0	5	9	0	–	12	0	–	133
51	(United States) Lowell Bailey	26	0	–	0	–	0	0	3	–	0	–	0	–	–	0	19	19	23	0	0	21	10	–	0	–	–	121
52	(Slovakia) Pavol Hurajt	0	7	11	0	–	0	0	0	–	0	5	–	–	–	21	0	1	–	0	0	26	22	–	3	24	–	120
53	(Czech Republic) Tomáš Holubec	0	8	2	29	15	20	0	0	–	0	–	0	4	–	0	–	–	–	0	10	19	11	–	0	–	–	118
54	(Sweden) David Ekholm	6	0	–	0	0	0	0	0	–	0	0	27	0	–	–	–	40	19	0	6	10	0	–	0	2	–	110
55	(Ukraine) Olexander Bilanenko	2	0	–	0	–	31	0	–	–	0	0	11	18	–	0	–	25	–	0	0	0	–	–	11	9	–	107
56	(Sweden) Magnús Jónsson	0	10	0	–	–	0	0	0	–	12	16	5	0	–	20	26	0	15	0	0	–	–	–	0	–	–	104
57	(Czech Republic) Roman Dostál	20	29	15	0	0	1	0	11	–	0	–	0	–	–	–	–	26	–	–	–	0	–	–	–	–	–	102
58	(Russia) Maxim Maksimov	0	0	0	6	28	0	2	0	–	20	22	0	0	–	–	–	4	–	7	1	3	2	–	–	–	–	95
59	(Germany) Daniel Bohm	–	–	–	–	–	–	–	12	–	–	–	–	–	–	–	–	–	–	54	21	0	–	–	7	0	–	94
60	(Germany) Simon Schempp	–	–	–	–	–	–	–	–	–	–	–	–	–	–	–	–	–	–	17	24	–	–	–	14	31	–	86
#	Name	ÖST IN	ÖST SP	ÖST PU	HOC SP	HOC PU	HOC IN	HOC SP	OBE SP	OBE MS	RUH SP	RUH PU	ANT SP	ANT PU	ANT MS	WCH SP	WCH PU	WCH IN	WCH MS	VAN IN	VAN SP	TRO SP	TRO PU	TRO MS	KHA SP	KHA PU	KHA MS	Total
61	(Estonia) Roland Lessing	5	0	–	0	–	25	0	–	–	5	0	0	5	–	0	–	0	–	–	–	31	13	–	–	–	–	84
62	(Switzerland) Ivan Joller	0	0	–	0	23	0	0	–	–	–	–	0	0	–	11	11	–	–	31	0	0	–	–	8	0	–	84
63	(Italy) Rene Laurent Vuillermoz	0	0	10	0	0	0	6	0	–	0	–	24	29	–	2	0	–	–	0	11	–	–	–	–	–	–	82
64	(Norway) Hans Martin Gjedrem	–	–	–	–	–	21	18	0	–	–	–	18	12	–	–	–	–	–	11	0	–	–	–	–	–	–	80
65	(Germany) Toni Lang	0	0	7	14	11	28	0	19	–	0	0	0	–	–	–	–	–	–	–	–	–	–	–	–	–	–	79
66	(Belarus) Alexandr Syman	27	12	0	0	–	23	0	0	–	–	–	0	–	–	6	5	0	–	0	0	0	0	–	–	–	–	73
67	(Norway) Stian Eckhoff	0	0	0	19	26	0	27	–	–	–	–	–	–	–	–	–	–	–	–	–	–	–	–	–	–	–	72
68	(Switzerland) Matthias Simmen	0	23	0	0	25	–	4	–	–	–	–	6	7	–	0	–	0	–	0	0	0	0	–	–	–	–	65
69	(Sweden) Jörgen Brink	0	0	0	15	9	0	0	0	–	–	–	–	–	–	–	–	–	–	0	40	0	–	–	0	–	–	64
70	(Italy) Christian Martinelli	7	0	–	0	–	–	0	–	–	0	–	0	–	–	18	9	0	–	19	0	–	–	–	–	–	–	53
71	(United States) Jeremy Teela	0	0	1	0	–	0	0	0	–	0	–	0	–	–	0	–	0	–	48	0	0	0	–	0	0	–	49
72	(China) Zhang Chengye	0	0	13	0	0	0	0	21	–	0	4	0	10	–	0	–	0	–	0	0	0	–	–	–	–	–	48
73	(Norway) Rune Brattsveen	–	–	–	–	–	0	7	–	–	–	–	–	–	–	–	–	–	–	–	–	–	–	–	22	16	–	45
74	(France) Jean-Guillaume Béatrix	0	0	0	16	0	6	–	0	–	–	–	–	–	–	–	–	–	–	21	0	–	–	–	–	–	–	43
75	(Finland) Paavo Puurunen	–	–	–	–	–	0	5	–	–	0	0	0	–	–	0	25	0	–	–	–	11	0	–	–	–	–	41
76	(Russia) Artem Gusev	0	–	–	–	–	–	–	–	–	–	–	–	–	–	–	–	–	–	–	0	0	0	–	13	25	–	38
77	(Switzerland) Thomas Frei	0	0	–	26	0	0	0	–	–	0	–	–	–	–	0	–	0	–	2	0	7	0	–	0	–	–	35
78	(Japan) Hidenori Isa	8	0	–	0	4	0	0	6	–	8	0	1	6	–	0	–	0	–	–	–	–	–	–	–	–	–	33
79	(Canada) Robin Clegg	0	3	0	0	3	–	–	–	–	0	12	0	0	–	0	0	2	–	12	0	–	–	–	–	–	–	32
80	(Latvia) Ilmārs Bricis	1	0	–	0	–	–	–	1	–	10	0	–	–	–	16	3	0	–	–	0	0	–	–	–	–	–	31
81	(Sweden) Fredrik Lindström	–	–	–	0	0	–	–	–	–	–	–	–	–	–	–	–	–	–	0	28	0	–	–	–	–	–	28
82	(France) Alexis Bœuf	–	–	–	–	–	0	21	0	–	0	–	0	–	–	–	–	–	–	–	–	0	7	–	0	0	–	28
83	(Ukraine) Oleg Berezhnoy	0	–	–	0	12	15	0	0	–	–	–	0	–	–	–	–	–	–	–	–	–	–	–	–	–	–	27
84	(Belarus) Sergey Sadovnikov	–	–	–	–	–	–	–	–	–	0	–	8	0	–	–	–	10	–	3	0	0	–	–	0	–	–	21
85	(Germany) Daniel Graf	18	0	0	0	0	0	0	–	–	–	–	–	–	–	–	–	–	–	–	–	–	–	–	–	–	–	18
86	(Slovakia) Dušan Šimočko	0	0	–	0	–	0	0	15	–	0	3	–	–	–	0	–	0	–	0	0	0	–	–	–	–	–	18
87	(France) Lois Habert	0	0	0	0	–	14	1	–	–	–	–	0	3	–	–	–	–	–	0	0	–	–	–	–	–	–	18
88	(Austria) Julian Eberhard	0	0	–	5	0	0	13	–	–	0	–	–	–	–	–	–	–	–	0	0	–	–	–	–	–	–	18
89	(Kazakhstan) Sergey Naumik	–	–	–	0	–	–	–	–	–	0	–	–	–	–	0	–	17	–	–	–	–	–	–	–	–	–	17
90	(Italy) Nicola Pozzi	0	0	–	–	–	16	0	0	–	0	–	0	–	–	–	–	0	–	–	–	–	–	–	–	–	–	16
#	Name	ÖST IN	ÖST SP	ÖST PU	HOC SP	HOC PU	HOC IN	HOC SP	OBE SP	OBE MS	RUH SP	RUH PU	ANT SP	ANT PU	ANT MS	WCH SP	WCH PU	WCH IN	WCH MS	VAN IN	VAN SP	TRO SP	TRO PU	TRO MS	KHA SP	KHA PU	KHA MS	Total
91	(Italy) Mattia Cola	–	–	–	8	0	0	–	–	–	–	–	–	–	–	–	–	–	–	–	–	4	1	–	0	–	–	13
92	(Slovakia) Marek Matiasko	12	0	–	0	–	0	0	0	–	0	0	–	–	–	0	–	0	–	–	–	–	–	–	–	–	–	12
93	(Russia) Anton Shipulin	–	–	–	–	–	–	–	0	–	0	–	–	–	–	–	–	–	–	–	–	0	–	–	0	12	–	12
94	(Russia) Sergey Balandin	–	–	–	–	–	–	–	–	–	–	–	–	–	–	–	–	–	–	–	–	–	–	–	0	11	–	11
95	(China) Zhang Qing	–	–	–	–	–	–	–	–	–	–	–	–	–	–	7	4	–	–	–	–	–	–	–	–	–	–	11
96	(Germany) Christoph Knie	–	–	–	–	–	–	–	–	–	–	–	–	–	–	–	–	–	–	–	–	–	–	–	9	1	–	10
97	(Bulgaria) Krasimir Anev	0	0	–	0	–	0	0	0	–	0	0	0	–	–	5	0	5	–	–	–	0	0	–	–	–	–	10
98	(Estonia) Indrek Tobreluts	0	9	0	0	0	–	0	0	–	–	–	0	–	–	0	–	0	–	–	–	0	–	–	0	–	–	9
99	(Czech Republic) Ondřej Moravec	9	0	–	0	–	0	0	0	–	0	–	0	0	–	–	–	–	–	0	0	0	–	–	–	–	–	9
100	(Bulgaria) Vladimir Iliev	0	0	–	0	–	0	0	0	–	0	–	0	–	–	0	–	9	–	–	–	0	–	–	–	–	–	9
101	(Kazakhstan) Alexsandr Chervyhkov	0	0	–	0	–	0	–	0	–	0	–	–	–	–	8	0	0	–	–	–	–	–	–	–	–	–	8
102	(Kazakhstan) Dias Keneshev	0	0	–	–	–	0	–	0	–	–	–	–	–	–	0	–	8	–	–	–	–	–	–	–	–	–	8
103	(Slovakia) Miroslav Matiaško	–	–	–	–	–	–	–	–	–	–	–	0	–	–	–	–	6	–	–	–	–	–	–	–	–	–	6
104	(Latvia) Kristaps Libietis	4	0	–	0	–	0	0	0	–	–	–	0	–	–	0	–	0	–	0	0	0	–	–	–	–	–	4
105	(Estonia) Priit Viks	0	0	–	0	–	0	0	0	–	3	0	0	–	–	0	0	0	–	–	–	–	–	–	0	0	–	3
106	(Estonia) Kauri Koiv	0	–	–	0	–	0	0	0	–	0	0	2	0	–	0	–	–	–	–	–	0	–	–	0	–	–	2
107	(Belarus) Evgeny Abramenko	0	0	–	0	–	0	0	0	–	–	–	0	0	–	0	–	–	–	1	0	0	–	–	0	–	–	1
