= Biri Church =

Church in Innlandet, Norway

- Biri kirke
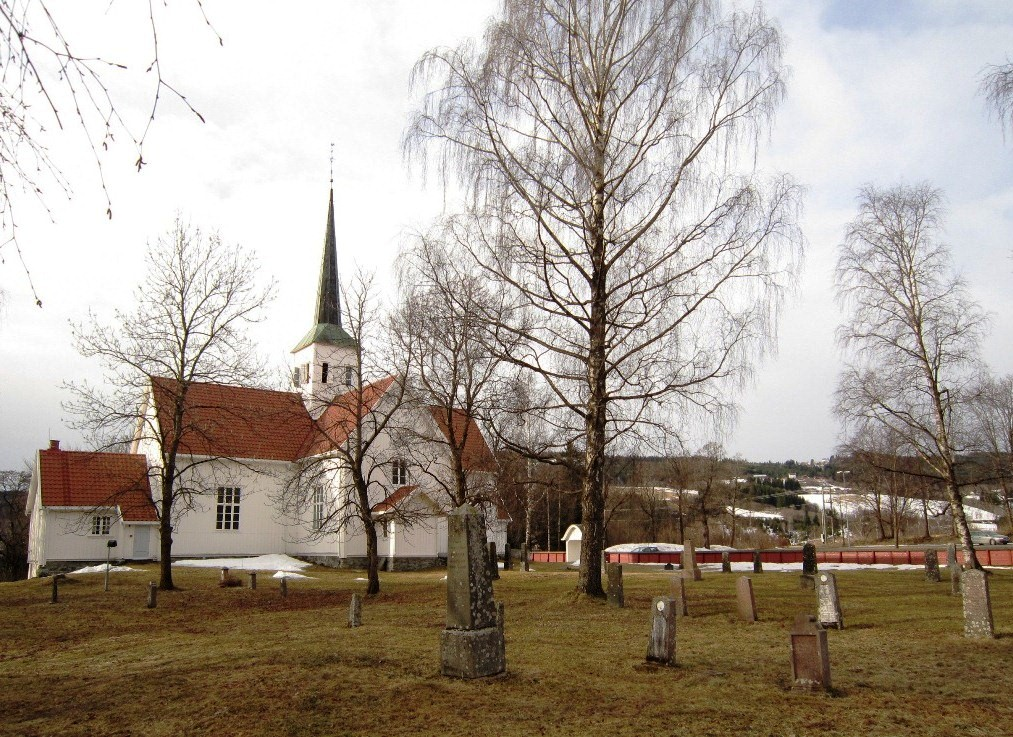
- View of the church
- Biri Church
- 60°57′32″N 10°35′31″E
- Location: Gjøvik Municipality, Innlandet
- Country: Norway
- Denomination: Church of Norway
- Previous denomination: Catholic Church
- Churchmanship: Evangelical Lutheran

History
- Status: Parish church
- Founded: 12th century
- Consecrated: 1777

Architecture
- Functional status: Active
- Architect: Amund Nilsen Gloppe
- Architectural type: Cruciform
- Completed: 1777 (249 years ago)

Specifications
- Capacity: 450
- Materials: Wood

Administration
- Diocese: Hamar bispedømme
- Deanery: Toten prosti
- Parish: Biri
- Norwegian Cultural Heritage Site
- Type: Church
- Status: Automatically protected
- ID: 83887

Biri Church (Norwegian: Biri kirke) is a parish church of the Church of Norway in Gjøvik Municipality in Innlandet county, Norway. It is located in the village of Biri. It is the church for the Biri parish which is part of the Toten prosti (deanery) in the Diocese of Hamar. The white, wooden church was built in a cruciform design in 1777 using plans drawn up by the architect Amund Nilsen Gloppe. The church seats about 450 people.

== History ==
The first church in Biri was a wooden stave church that was built during the second half of the 12th century. This church was located about 30 metres (98 ft) to the north of the present church. Around 1660, the old church was enlarged by adding transept wings to the north and south to create a cruciform floor plan. The church fell into disrepair over time and the congregation grew too large for the small building. By the 1770s, it was decided to tear down the old church and to build a new church. Amund Nilsen Gloppe was hired to design and build the new church. The new wooden cruciform building was built about 30 metres (98 ft) to the south of the old church. It had the chancel in the eastern wing with a small sacristy extension as well. They built a tower over the central part of the roof.

In 1814, this church served as an election church (Norwegian: valgkirke). Together with more than 300 other parish churches across Norway, it was a polling station for elections to the 1814 Norwegian Constituent Assembly which wrote the Constitution of Norway. This was Norway's first national elections. Each church parish was a constituency that elected people called "electors" who later met together in each county to elect the representatives for the assembly that was to meet at Eidsvoll Manor later that year.

The church has furniture with acanthus design and is the oldest church in Gjøvik municipality. The church underwent a major restoration in 2007 after major rot damage was discovered. The same year the church was painted.

== Cemetery ==
The graveyard surrounding the church was used from 1891 to 1942. A new, much larger cemetery was opened on a site about 500 metres (1,600 ft) to the east of the church. The new cemetery covers about 7 acres (2.8 ha), with about 1 acre (0.40 ha) of that land that is still undeveloped. There is room for 3270 graves, of which 1100 are vacant. In the undeveloped part of the cemetery there is room for an additional 400 graves.

One of the 112 Eidsvold men, Anders Lysgaard and former parliamentary representative Gunnar Kalrasten are both buried in the cemetery. Five English soldiers and one Norwegian soldier from World War II were all killed at Biri by the Germans on 20 April 1940. These people are buried in the cemetery at a war memorial.

== Priests in Biri Church ==
- 2012–present: Hanne Moesgaard Skjesol
- 1992–2012: Knut Yngvar Sønstegaard
- 1987–1992: Arne Wilther
- 1979–1987: Øyvind Hartberg
- 1973–1979: Reidar Nilsen
- 1962–1973: Hans Ihlen Nistad
- 1947–1962: Jørgen Overå
- 1929–1946: Sigvald Krohn
- 1921–1928: Edvard Olai Arstein
- 1909–1921: Hans Wråmann Domås

== Media gallery ==
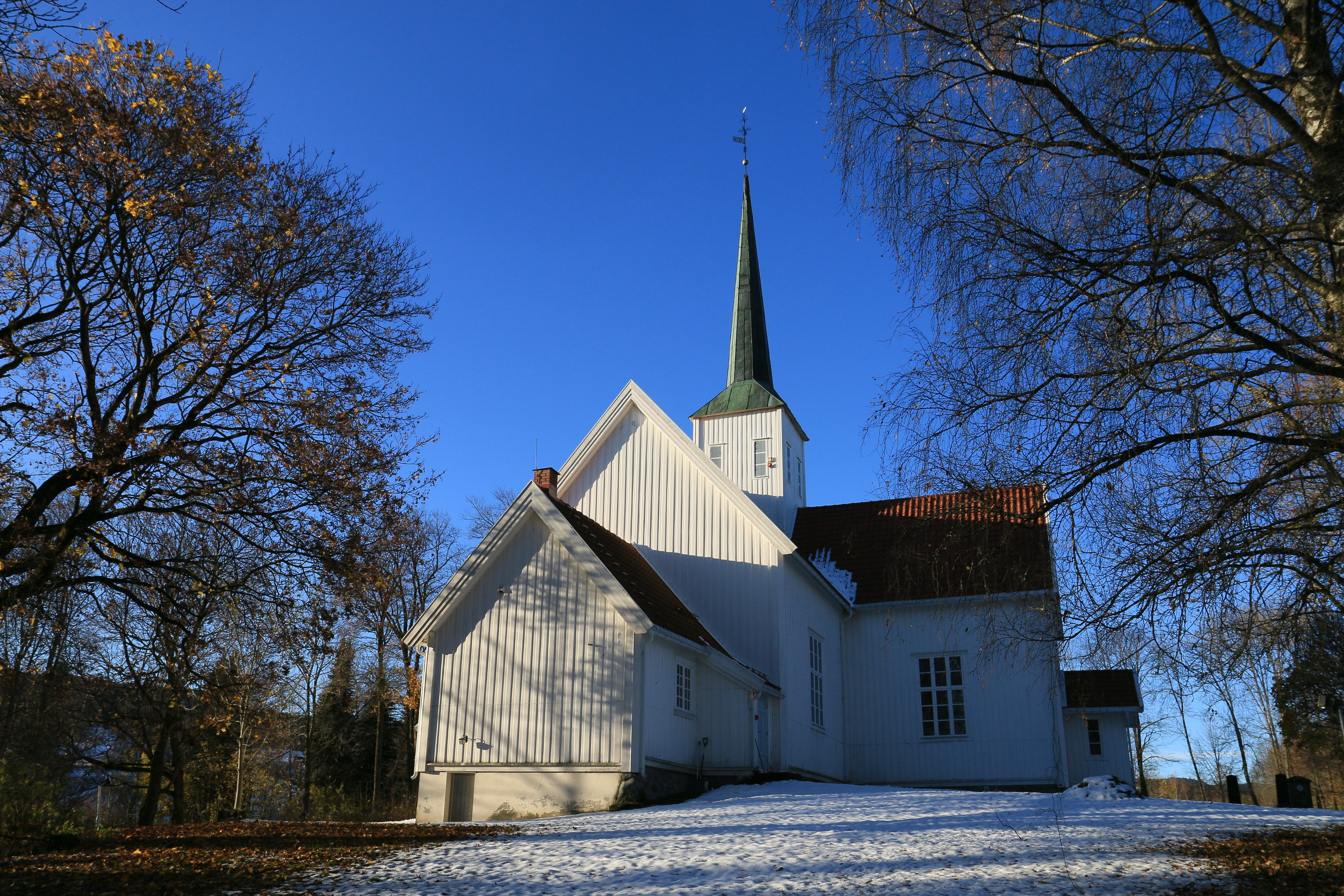

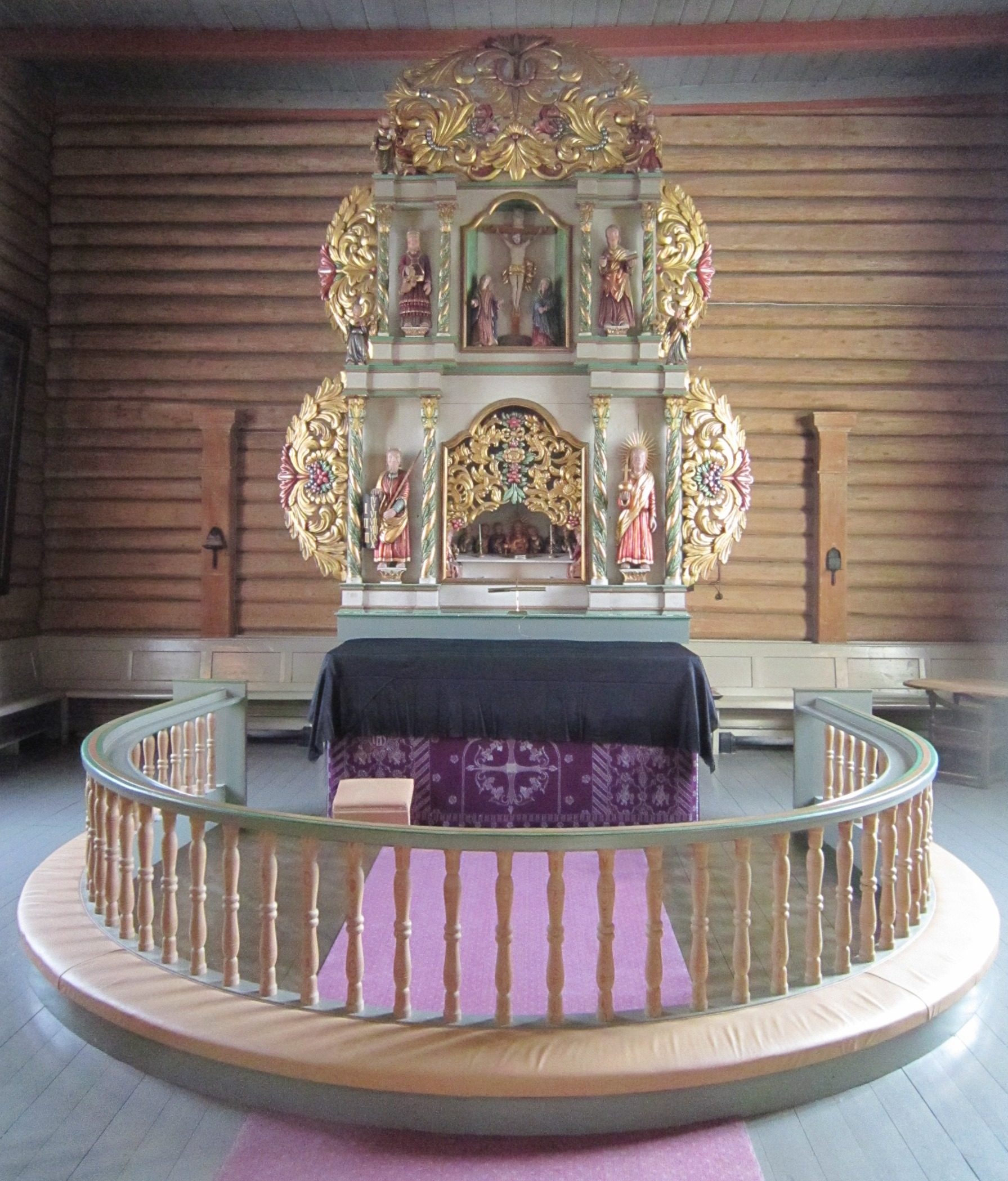

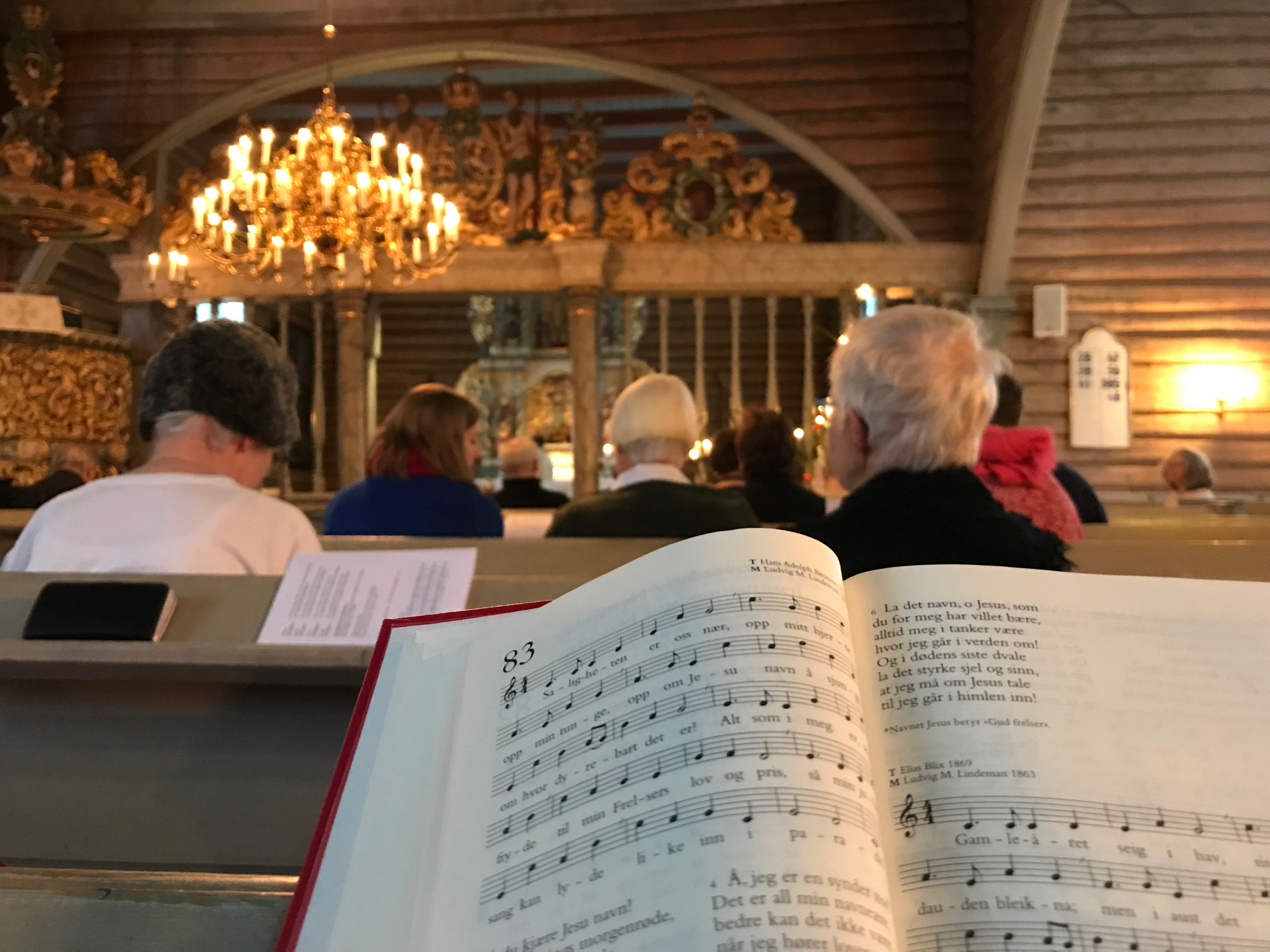

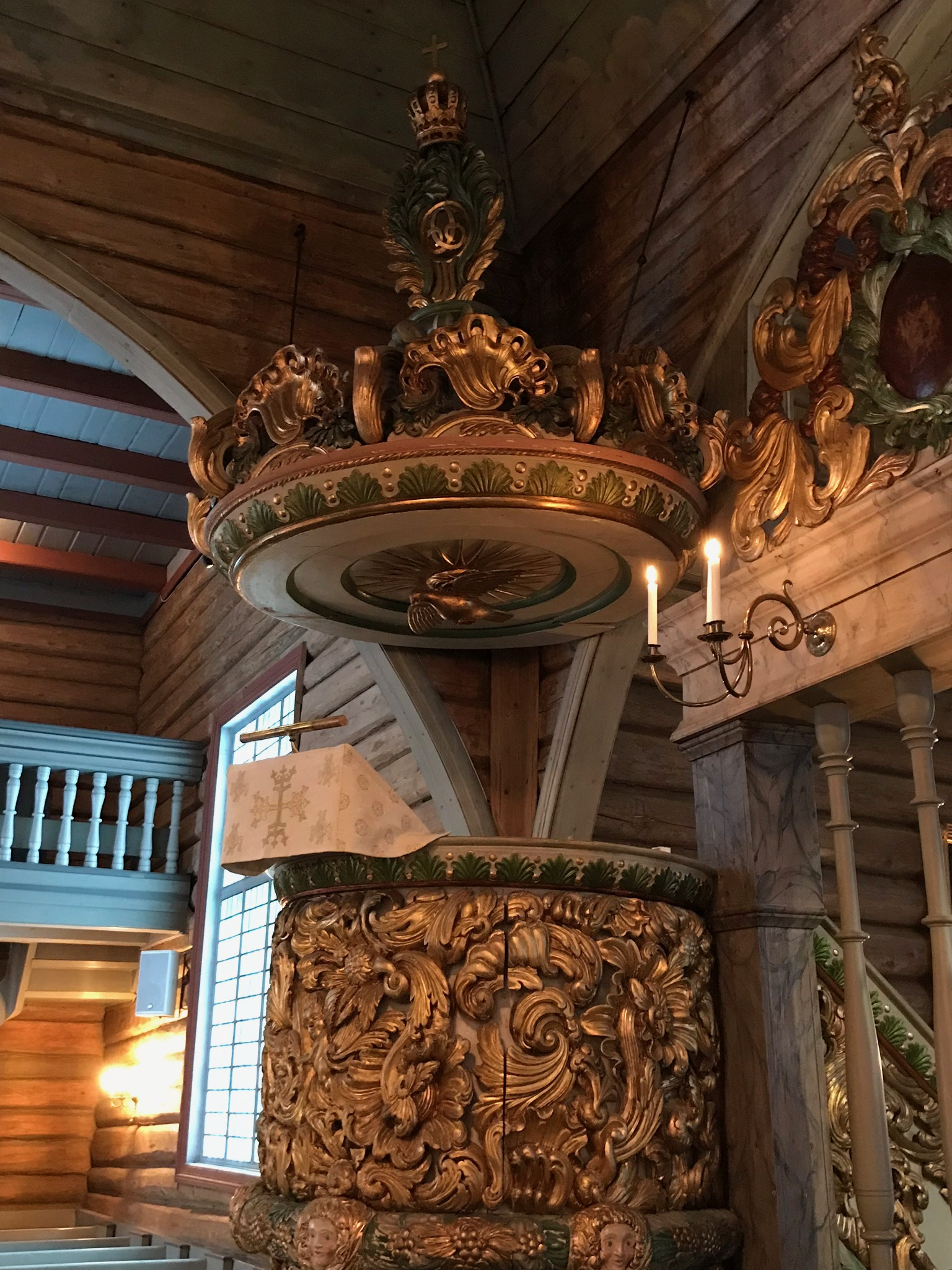

== See also ==
- List of churches in Hamar
