= Madshus =

Norwegian ski equipment manufacturer

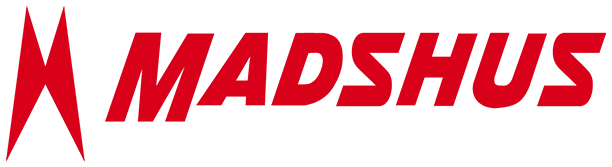
- Type: Subsidiary
- Industry: Sports equipment
- Founded: 1906; 120 years ago in Vardal, Oppland, Norway
- Founder: Martin Madshus
- Headquarters: Biri, Gjøvik, Innlandet, Norway
- Products: Cross country skis, ski boots, poles
- Number of employees: 64 (2026)
- Parent: K2 Sports
- Website: madshus.com

Madshus is a Norwegian ski and ski-equipment manufacturer, located at Biri in Gjøvik. The company produces cross-country skis, ski boots and poles.

== History ==
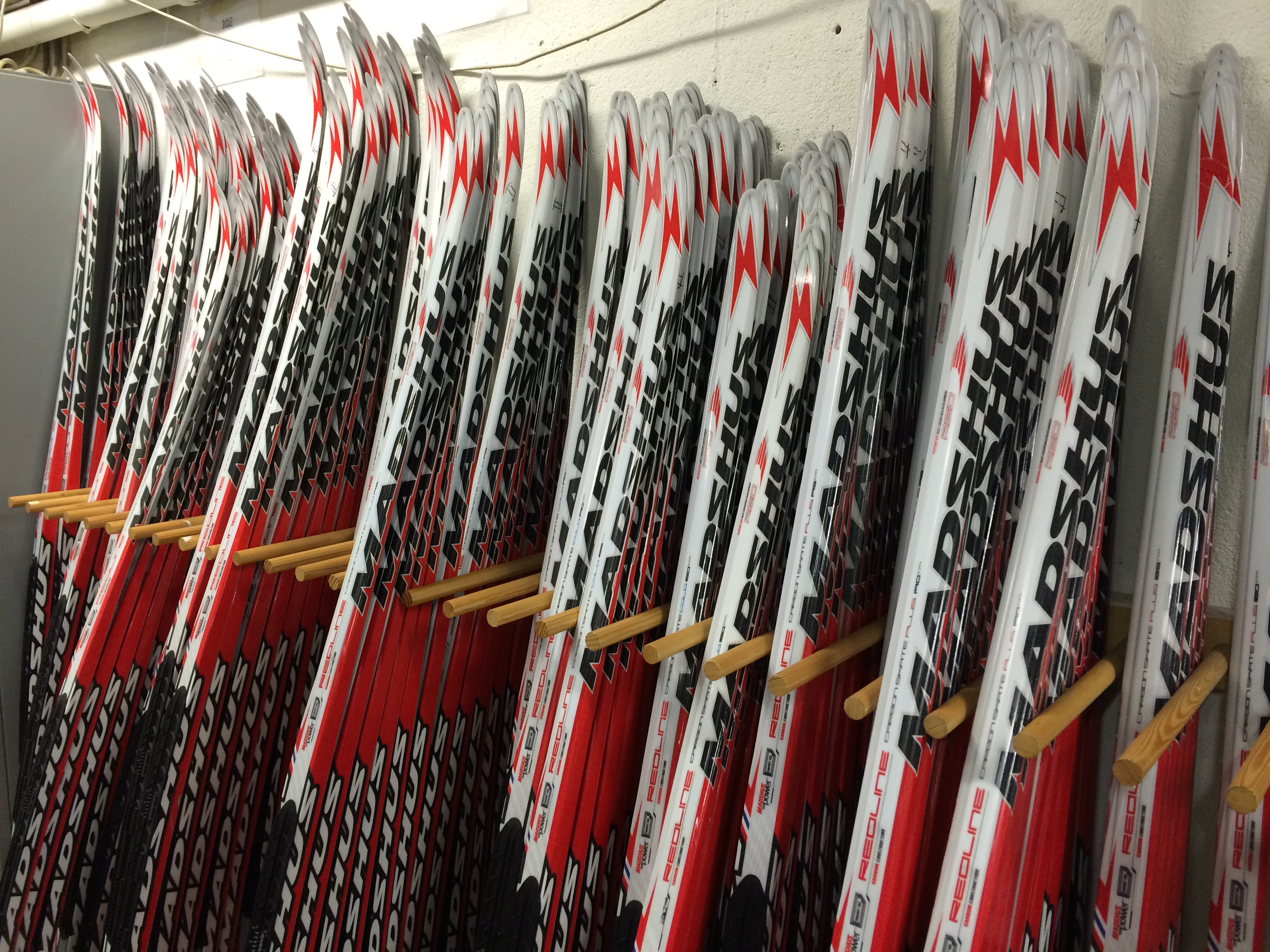
Madshus skis

Madshus is one of the world's oldest ski manufacturers. The first Madshus skis were produced by Martin Madshus in 1906 in a barn in Vardal Municipality near the town of Gjøvik. The company moved to Lillehammer in 1936 and then to Biri in 1972. In 1988, the factory was bought by K2 Sports Inc, but the skis are still produced at Biri. Some Madshus skis have been made in China (e.g. some 2013-2014 Glittertinds).

Madshus is one of only three remaining Norwegian ski manufacturers, the others being Åsnes Ski and Rønning Ski.

Notable Madshus skiers
Discipline	Flag	Athlete
Biathlon	(Norway)	Ole Einar Bjørndalen
Biathlon	(Norway)	Halvard Hanevold
Biathlon	(Norway)	Emil Hegle Svendsen
Biathlon	(Norway)	Sturla Holm Lægreid
Biathlon	(Germany)	Michael Greis
Biathlon	(Germany)	Kati Wilhelm
Biathlon	(Sweden)	Anna-Carin Olofsson
Cross country	(Norway)	Frode Estil
Cross country	(Norway)	Kristin Størmer Steira
Cross country	(Norway)	Heidi Weng
Cross country	(Germany)	Axel Teichmann
Cross country	(Germany)	René Sommerfeldt
Cross country	(Germany)	Evi Sachenbacher Stehle
Cross country	(Italy)	Christian Zorzi
Cross country	(Finland)	Krista Pärmäkoski
Cross country	(France)	Renaud Jay
Nordic combined	(Norway)	Magnus Moan
Nordic combined	(Finland)	Antti Kuisma
Nordic combined	(Finland)	Hannu Manninen
Nordic combined	(Germany)	Ronny Ackermann
Nordic combined	(Germany)	Sebastian Haseney
Nordic combined	(Germany)	Georg Hettich
