= Biri, Norway =

Village in Gjøvik Municipality, Norway

Biri
- Village
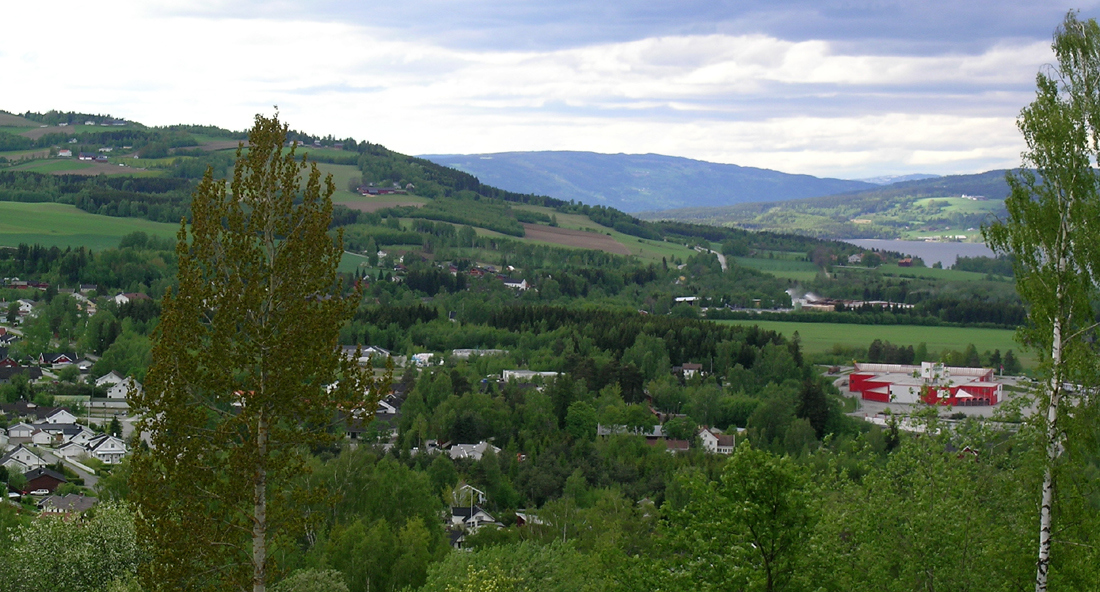
- View of the village
- Interactive map of Biri
- Location within Innlandet Location within Norway
- Coordinates: 60.95558°N 10.6115°E
- Country: Norway
- Region: Eastern Norway
- County: Innlandet
- District: Vestoppland
- Municipality: Gjøvik Municipality

Area
  - Total: 2.08 km^{2} (0.80 sq mi)
- Elevation: 145 m (476 ft)

Population (2024)
  - Total: 1,666
  - Density: 801/km^{2} (2,070/sq mi)
- Time zone: UTC+01:00 (CET)
  - Summer (DST): UTC+02:00 (CEST)
- Post Code: 2836 Biri

Biri is a village in Gjøvik Municipality in Innlandet county, Norway. The village is located along the western shore of the lake Mjøsa, about 20 kilometres (12 mi) north of the town of Gjøvik. The Norwegian National Road 4 highway runs through the village which is near the Mjøsa Bridge about halfway between the towns of Lillehammer and Gjøvik.

The 2.08-square-kilometre (510-acre) village has a population (2024) of 1,666 and a population density of 801 inhabitants per square kilometre (2,070/sq mi).

== History ==
The village of Biri was the administrative centre of the old Biri Municipality which existed from 1838 until 1964 when it was merged into Gjøvik Municipality. The village of Biri has been the commercial centre of the surrounding countryside for a long time. The area has traditionally been centred around agriculture and forestry.

Biri Church is a cruciform church in Biri dating back to 1777. Built of timber, it has 450 seats. The church was erected after the original church burned down. In 1890, there was another major fire, this time at the Biri parsonage. The fire also destroyed church records for 1789-1814 and 1854–1877. In April 2007, major damage in the church led to an extensive rehabilitation.

Biri Glassworks produced glass, windows, and bottles. Production started in 1764 after it was created by Royal Norwegian charter. The operation went bankrupt in 1843, but was rebuilt in 1855. In the 1880s, it was closed.

Madshus is a Norwegian ski and ski-equipment manufacturer which is located at Biri. The first Madshus skis were produced by Martin Madshus in 1906 in a barn in the neighboring Vardal Municipality. The company was moved to Lillehammer in 1936, and then to Biri in 1972.

=== Name ===
The village is named "Biri" after the old Biri farm (Old Norse: Biríð) since the first Biri Church was located there. The name is presumably very old, and the meaning is unknown. One possibility is that the Old Norse name came from berhíð which means "bear den".

== Notable residents ==
- Torbjørn Løkken, Nordic combined skier
- Gunnar Kalrasten, parliamentary representative for the Norwegian Labour Party
