= Biathlon World Championships 2009 – Men's pursuit =

These are the official results of the men's 12.5 km pursuit event at the Biathlon World Championships 2009 in Pyeongchang, South Korea.

rank	name	time	penalties
1	(Norway) Ole Einar Bjørndalen	31:46.7	4 (0+2+0+2)
2	(Russia) Maxim Tchoudov	+41.7	3 (0+0+1+2)
3	(Norway) Alexander Os	+52.8	3 (0+0+2+1)
4	(Poland) Tomasz Sikora	+1:33.4	3 (0+0+2+1)
5	(Norway) Lars Berger	+1:52.9	8 (2+3+1+2)
6	(Norway) Halvard Hanevold	+2:06.9	5 (0+1+3+1)
7	(Ukraine) Andriy Deryzemlya	+2:09.8	4 (0+1+2+1)
8	(France) Martin Fourcade	+2:20.9	4 (0+0+2+2)
9	(Germany) Michael Rösch	+2:29.2	4 (0+1+2+1)
10	(France) Simon Fourcade	+2:31.7	6 (2+1+2+1)
11	(Slovenia) Klemen Bauer	+2:32.8	4 (2+1+0+1)
12	(Italy) Christian de Lorenzi	+2:36.2	3 (2+0+1+0)
13	(Germany) Michael Greis	+2:59.1	5 (0+1+2+2)
14	(Austria) Simon Eder	+3:11.9	6 (1+0+3+2)
15	(Sweden) Magnús Jónsson	+3:21.6	4 (0+2+1+1)
16	(Finland) Paavo Puurunen	+3:24.0	2 (0+1+0+1)
17	(Russia) Andrei Makoveev	+3:25.3	4 (2+0+2+0)
18	(Germany) Alexander Wolf	+3:40.6	2 (0+0+2+0)
19	(Czech Republic) Michal Šlesingr	+4:06.5	5 (1+2+1+1)
20	(Russia) Evgeny Ustyugov	+4:07.4	4 (0+1+2+1)
21	(United States) Tim Burke	+4:13.1	8 (1+2+4+1)
22	(United States) Lowell Bailey	+4:14.3	4 (2+1+1+0)
23	(Italy) Markus Windisch	+4:18.0	6 (1+1+0+4)
24	(Austria) Daniel Mesotitsch	+4:23.4	6 (1+1+1+3)
25	(Croatia) Jakov Fak	+4:28.2	6 (1+1+2+2)
26	(Russia) Ivan Tcherezov	+4:31.0	5 (2+1+1+1)
27	(Sweden) Mattias Nilsson	+4:34.1	7 (1+1+2+3)
28	(Czech Republic) Zdeněk Vítek	+4:35.5	5 (0+0+4+1)
29	(Switzerland) Simon Hallenbarter	+4:41.7	8 (1+3+2+2)
30	(Switzerland) Ivan Joller	+4:42.4	4 (0+1+2+1)
31	(Sweden) Björn Ferry	+4:46.8	5 (1+3+0+1)
32	(Italy) Christian Martinelli	+4:54.1	7 (1+3+2+1)
33	(Ukraine) Roman Pryma	+4:57.2	8 (2+2+2+2)
34	(Austria) Dominik Landertinger	+4:57.4	10 (3+3+2+2)
35	(Slovenia) Janez Maric	+5:03.0	7 (3+0+1+3)
36	(Belarus) Alexandr Syman	+5:05.1	5 (0+1+3+1)
37	(China) Zhang Qing	+5:07.6	4 (0+1+2+1)
38	(Latvia) Ilmārs Bricis	+5:08.0	8 (2+2+2+2)
39	(France) Vincent Jay	+5:15.6	5 (1+3+1+0)
40	(France) Vincent Defrasne	+5:17.0	6 (1+3+1+1)
41	(Germany) Christoph Stephan	+5:35.0	8 (4+1+0+3)
42	(Belarus) Rustam Valiullin	+5:41.1	7 (1+2+2+2)
43	(Italy) Rene Laurent Vuillermoz	+5:43.5	9 (2+4+2+1)
44	(Canada) Robin Clegg	+5:43.8	6 (0+2+2+2)
45	(Bulgaria) Krasimir Anev	+6:00.9	6 (2+2+1+1)
46	(Canada) Jean Philippe Leguellec	+6:01.3	5 (0+0+1+4)
47	(Czech Republic) Jaroslav Soukup	+6:15.6	7 (2+3+2+0)
48	(Belarus) Sergey Novikov	+6:18.3	7 (3+1+2+1)
48	(Ukraine) Vyacheslav Derkach	+6:38.7	8 (1+3+3+1)
50	(Kazakhstan) Alexsandr Chervyhkov	+6:39.6	10 (2+2+3+3)
51	(Finland) Timo Antila	+6:45.1	7 (0+4+1+2)
52	(Japan) Junji Nagai	+6:46.1	7 (1+3+2+1)
53	(Slovakia) Pavol Hurajt	+6:48.7	10 (2+4+2+2)
54	(Japan) Tatsumi Kasahara	+7:57.7	5 (1+1+2+1)
55	(Finland) Marko Juhani Mänttäri	+8:30.6	8 (3+2+1+2)
56	(United States) Russell Currier	+8:55.5	12 (2+3+2+5)
DNS	(Slovakia) Marek Matiasko		
DNS	(Latvia) Edgars Piksons		
LAP	(Estonia) Priit Viks		
DSQ	(Romania) Roland Gerbacea		
