= Ole Einar Bjørndalen =

Norwegian biathlete (born 1974)

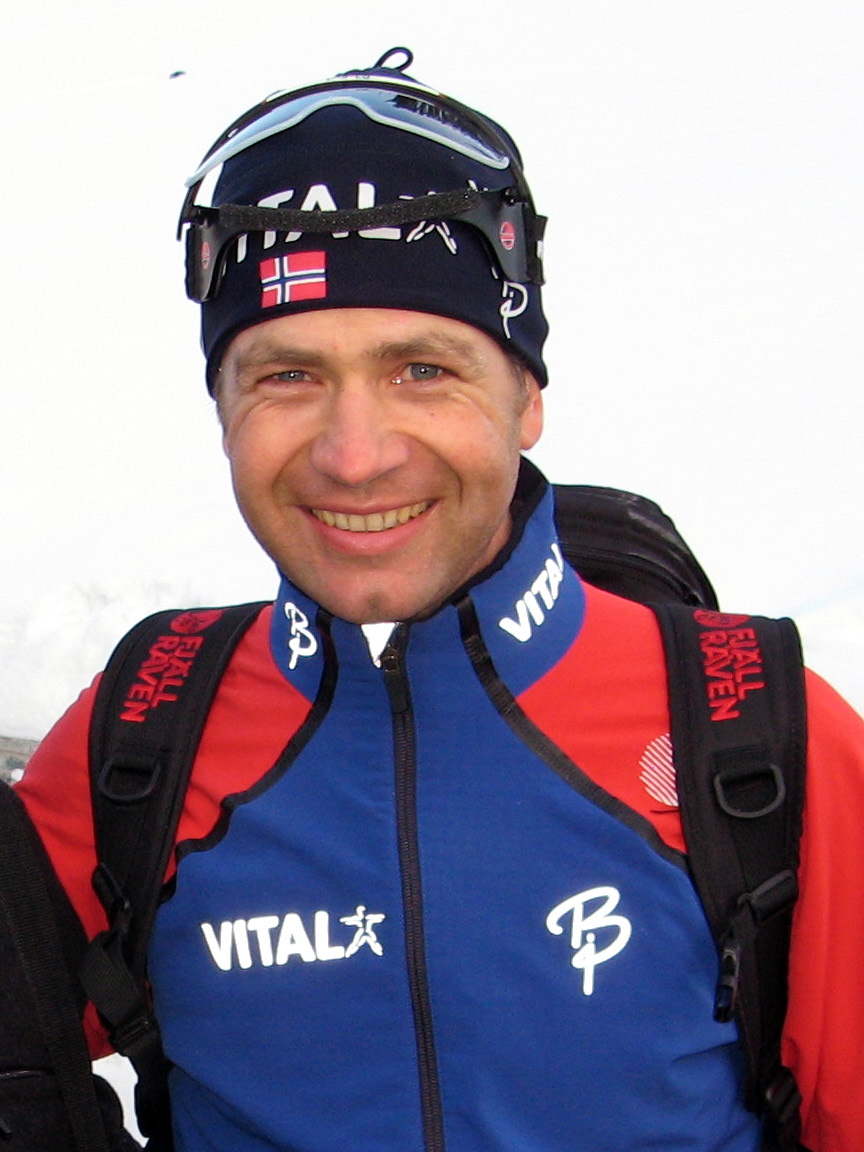
- Bjørndalen in 2007

Personal information
- Nicknames: King of Biathlon; The Cannibal
- Born: 27 January 1974 (age 52) Drammen, Norway
- Height: 1.79 m (5 ft 10 in)
- Spouses: Nathalie Santer (m. 2006; div. 2012) Darya Domracheva (m. 2016)
- Website: oleeinarbjorndalen.com

Sport

Professional information
- Sport: Biathlon; Cross-country skiing
- Club: Simostranda IL; Byåsen IL
- Skis: Madshus
- Rifle: Anschütz
- World Cup debut: 18 March 1993; 28 November 1998

Olympic Games
- Teams: 6 (1994, 1998, 2002, 2006, 2010, 2014); 1 (2002)
- Medals: 14 (8 gold)

World Championships
- Teams: 23 (1994, 1995, 1996, 1997, 1998, 1999, 2000, 2001, 2002, 2003, 2004, 2005, 2006, 2007, 2008, 2009, 2010, 2011, 2012, 2013, 2015, 2016, 2017); 2 (2005, 2007)
- Medals: 45 (20 gold)

World Cup
- Seasons: 26 (1993 – 2018)
- Individual races: 478 (biathlon); 16 (cross-country skiing)
- All races: 582 (biathlon); 20 (cross-country skiing)
- Individual victories: 95 (biathlon); 1 (cross-country skiing)
- All victories: 136 (biathlon); 1 (cross-country skiing)
- Individual podiums: 179 (biathlon); 3 (cross-country skiing)
- All podiums: 259 (biathlon); 5 (cross-country skiing)
- Overall titles: 6 (1997–98, 2002–03, 2004–05, 2005–06, 2007–08, 2008–09)
- Discipline titles: 20: 1 Individual (2004–05); 9 Sprint (1994–95, 1996–97, 1997–98, 1999–00, 2000–01, 2002–03, 2004–05, 2007–08, 2008–09); 5 Pursuit (1999–00, 2002–03, 2005–06, 2007–08, 2008–09); 5 Mass start (2002–03, 2004–05, 2005–06, 2006–07, 2007–08)
Medal record
Event	1st	2nd	3rd
Olympic Games	8	4	2
World Championships	20	14	11
Summer World Championships	1	1	1
Junior/Youth World Championships	3	0	1
Total (66 medals)	32	19	15
Olympic Games
Gold medal – first place	1998 Nagano	10 km sprint
Gold medal – first place	2002 Salt Lake City	20 km individual
Gold medal – first place	2002 Salt Lake City	10 km sprint
Gold medal – first place	2002 Salt Lake City	12.5 km pursuit
Gold medal – first place	2002 Salt Lake City	4 × 7.5 km relay
Gold medal – first place	2010 Vancouver	4 × 7.5 km relay
Gold medal – first place	2014 Sochi	10 km sprint
Gold medal – first place	2014 Sochi	Mixed relay
Silver medal – second place	1998 Nagano	4 × 7.5 km relay
Silver medal – second place	2006 Turin	20 km individual
Silver medal – second place	2006 Turin	12.5 km pursuit
Silver medal – second place	2010 Vancouver	20 km individual
Bronze medal – third place	2006 Turin	15 km mass start
Bronze medal – third place	2014 Sochi	4 × 7.5 km relay
World Championships
Gold medal – first place	1998 Hochfilzen	Team event
Gold medal – first place	2003 Khanty-Mansiysk	10 km sprint
Gold medal – first place	2003 Khanty-Mansiysk	15 km mass start
Gold medal – first place	2005 Hochfilzen	10 km sprint
Gold medal – first place	2005 Hochfilzen	12.5 km pursuit
Gold medal – first place	2005 Hochfilzen	15 km mass start
Gold medal – first place	2005 Hochfilzen	4 × 7.5 km relay
Gold medal – first place	2007 Antholz-Anterselva	10 km sprint
Gold medal – first place	2007 Antholz-Anterselva	12.5 km pursuit
Gold medal – first place	2008 Östersund	12.5 km pursuit
Gold medal – first place	2009 Pyeongchang	20 km individual
Gold medal – first place	2009 Pyeongchang	10 km sprint
Gold medal – first place	2009 Pyeongchang	12.5 km pursuit
Gold medal – first place	2009 Pyeongchang	4 × 7.5 km relay
Gold medal – first place	2011 Khanty-Mansiysk	4 × 7.5 km relay
Gold medal – first place	2011 Khanty-Mansiysk	Mixed relay
Gold medal – first place	2012 Ruhpolding	4 × 7.5 km relay
Gold medal – first place	2012 Ruhpolding	Mixed relay
Gold medal – first place	2013 Nové Město	4 × 7.5 km relay
Gold medal – first place	2016 Oslo	4 × 7.5 km relay
Silver medal – second place	1997 Brezno-Osrblie	4 × 7.5 km relay
Silver medal – second place	1998 Pokljuka	12.5 km pursuit
Silver medal – second place	2000 Lahti	4 × 7.5 km relay
Silver medal – second place	2001 Pokljuka	15 km mass start
Silver medal – second place	2004 Oberhof	4 × 7.5 km relay
Silver medal – second place	2006 Pokljuka	Mixed relay
Silver medal – second place	2007 Antholz-Anterselva	4 × 7.5 km relay
Silver medal – second place	2008 Östersund	20 km individual
Silver medal – second place	2008 Östersund	15 km mass start
Silver medal – second place	2008 Östersund	4 × 7.5 km relay
Silver medal – second place	2010 Khanty-Mansiysk	Mixed relay
Silver medal – second place	2015 Kontiolahti	4 × 7.5 km relay
Silver medal – second place	2016 Oslo	10 km sprint
Silver medal – second place	2016 Oslo	12.5 km pursuit
Bronze medal – third place	1997 Brezno-Osrblie	12.5 km pursuit
Bronze medal – third place	1999 Oslo Holmenkollen	15 km mass start
Bronze medal – third place	1999 Kontiolahti	4 × 7.5 km relay
Bronze medal – third place	2000 Oslo Holmenkollen	15 km mass start
Bronze medal – third place	2001 Pokljuka	4 × 7.5 km relay
Bronze medal – third place	2004 Oberhof	20 km individual
Bronze medal – third place	2004 Oberhof	10 km sprint
Bronze medal – third place	2004 Oberhof	12.5 km pursuit
Bronze medal – third place	2008 Östersund	10 km sprint
Bronze medal – third place	2016 Oslo	15 km mass start
Bronze medal – third place	2017 Hochfilzen	12.5 km pursuit
Junior World Championships
Bronze medal – third place	1992 Canmore	4 × 7.5 km relay
Gold medal – first place	1993 Ruhpolding	20 km individual
Gold medal – first place	1993 Ruhpolding	10 km sprint
Gold medal – first place	1993 Ruhpolding	4 × 7.5 km relay

Ole Einar Bjørndalen (Norwegian pronunciation: [ˈûːɽə ˈæ̂ɪnɑr ˈbjø̂ːɳˌɖɑːɫn̩]; born 27 January 1974) is a retired Norwegian professional biathlete and coach, often referred to by the nickname, the "King of Biathlon". With 14 Winter Olympic Games medals, he is second on the list of multiple medalists behind Marit Bjørgen who has won 15 medals. He is also the most successful biathlete of all time at the Biathlon World Championships, having won 45 medals. With 95 World Cup wins, Bjørndalen is ranked first all-time for career victories on the Biathlon World Cup tour. He has won the Overall World Cup title six times, in 1997–98, in 2002–03, in 2004–05, in 2005–06, in 2007–08 and in 2008–09.

In 1992, he won his first career medal at the junior world championships. A year later in 1993, after winning three junior world championship titles, a medal haul only previously achieved by Sergei Tchepikov, Bjørndalen made his Biathlon World Cup debut. His breakthrough came in 1994 when he featured on his first World Cup podium in a sprint race held in Bad Gastein, Austria. Bjørndalen first competed in the Olympic Games at the Lillehammer 1994 Winter Olympics, held in his home country of Norway. He obtained his first major victory on 11 January 1996 in an individual competition held in Antholz-Anterselva, Italy. On 20 February 2014, Bjørndalen was elected to an eight-year term at the International Olympic Committee's athlete commission. He resigned from this role in 2016 as he elected to continue his career.

== Career ==
At the age of 16 Bjørndalen left home to pursue his sporting career at a sports academy in Geilo, where he initially trained in both cross-country skiing and biathlon, although after one year there he decided to focus on the latter.

In 1993, at the age of 19, Bjørndalen first came into focus by winning 3 out of 4 possible gold medals at the Junior Biathlon World Championships, which among other things led to him being chosen to represent Norway in the 1994 Olympics, at the cost of highly merited biathlete Eirik Kvalfoss. At those Games Bjørndalen's best finish was a 28th position in the sprint.

He has won the World Cup six times (1997–98, 2002–03, 2004–05, 2005–06, 2007–08, and 2008–09), finished second six times (1996–97, 1998–99, 1999–2000, 2000–01, 2003–04, and 2006–07), and third once (2001–02). In his first season (1992–93) he finished 62nd, the season after, 30th and the season after that, fourth. In the 1995–96 season, he dropped down to ninth, but finished in the runner-up position in 1996–97. When winning the overall world cup in 1998, at the age of 24, he won titles at each of the three major championships in biathlon in one season – a world championship gold medal, an Olympic gold medal and the overall World Cup title. He finished second in the overall World Cup for the following three seasons and then third in 2001–02.

His World Cup podium record is 179 podium finishes, 95 1st places, 53 2nd places, and 31 3rd places in the individual events. Bjørndalen has 1 World Cup victory in the team event. In relay Bjørndalen has won 37 races, he has also 21 2nd places and 14 3rd.places. In total he has 72 podium finishes in the world cup, relay event. Bjørndalen has 259 World cup podium finishes, individual, team and relay races combined in Biathlon, and 5 podium finishes in cross-country skiing World cup. In total Ole Einar Bjørndalen has 257 World cup podium finishes. When he took his 87th World Cup race victory in February 2009, he overtook Ingemar Stenmark as the skier with the most World Cup wins in history.

Bjørndalen has won the Sprint world cup nine times in the seasons: 1994–1995, 1996–1997, 1997–1998, 1999–2000, 2000–01, 2002–03, 2004–05, 2007–08 and 2008–09. Ole Einar Bjoerndalen also came 2nd in the Sprint world cup in the seasons: 2003–04 and 2005–06. Ole Einar has won Pursuit world cup five times from 1999 to 1900, 2002–03, 2005–06, 2007–08 and 2008–09. He has 2nd place in the seasons 2000–01, 2003–04, 2004–05, 2006–07 and 3rd places in 1996–97, 1998–99 and 2001–02. Bjoerndalen has been winner of the Mass start world cup five times in: 2002–03, 2004–05, 2005–06, 2006–07 and 2007–08. He came 2nd in 2000–01, 2003–04 and 2008–09. Ole Einar Bjoerndalen was number 3 in the Mass start world cup in the season 1998–99. He has also once won the Individual distance world cup. It was in 2004–05. Bjoerndalen has also finished number 2 in the 1998–99, 2000–01, 2001–02 and 2005–06 seasons. Ole Einar also came 3rd in the 1997–98 season. He has won a total of 20 times, 13 times finished in second place and five times came in 3rd place. Overall, he has been on the podium 38 times.

Bjørndalen has won the relay world cup 11 times in the seasons: 1997–98, 1999–00, 2000–01, 2001–02, 2003–04, 2004–05, 2007–08, 2009–10, 2010–11, 2015–16 and 2017–18. He has 6 times finished second in the world cup relay in: 1996–97, 2006–07, 2008–09, 2011–12, 2012–13 and 2014–15. Bjoerndalen also came in third place in 1998–99 and 2002–03. Altogether he has been on the podium 19 seasons in the world cup relay. Bjørndalen has won the mixed relay world cup 4 times. It happened in the seasons: 2012–13, 2013–14, 2014–15 and 2015–16. Bjørndalen has won (together with the Norwegian biathlon team) the nations cup ten times. It happened in the: 1998–99, 2002–03, 2003–04, 2004–05, 2007–08, 2008–09, 2010–11, 2013–14, 2014–15 and 2015–16 season. Bjørndalen has also achieved five-second places in the nations cup in the years: 1999–00, 2000–01, 2001–02, 2005–06 and 2012–13. He has finished in third place in the nations cup 3 times, in the: 1996–97, 1997–98 and 2006–07 season. In total he has finished 18 times at the podium in the nations cup for men.

He is the only biathlete ever to win all biathlon events in a single Winter Olympics (2002 Salt Lake City Games). This encompassed the sprint, pursuit, individual, and relay events, the latter together with three other participants. He was the most successful competitor at these Games. This also made him only the third Winter Olympian to win four golds at one Games, and he was also the first biathlete to win more than two gold medals at a single Games. In addition, he had won all three competitions staged at the Olympic test event in Salt Lake City the previous year. He also took a four gold medal haul at the Biathlon World Championships 2005 in Hochfilzen, Austria and at the Biathlon World Championships 2009 in Pyeongchang, South Korea. Bjørndalen's 95 biathlon World Cup victories and one cross-country victory is two behind of Gunda Niemann-Stirnemann's record of 98 World Cup victories for a winter sport athlete.

At the 2006 Winter Olympics in Turin, Bjørndalen took three medals from five events, winning two silvers and a bronze. At the Vancouver 2010 Winter Olympics, Bjørndalen became the most successful biathlete in Winter Olympic history by surpassing the previous record of nine career Olympic medals, which he shared with Uschi Disl of Germany. He then anchored Norway to gold in the 4 × 7.5 km relay. This was the second time that Norway had won a title in this event, with the other being at the 2002 Winter Olympics (also anchored by Bjørndalen). With this victory he became the second most decorated Winter Olympian of all time and one of only two athletes to win 11 medals at the Winter Olympics. With his gold medal in 10 km sprint at the Sochi 2014 Winter Olympics, he tied fellow Norwegian Bjørn Dæhlie for most Winter Olympic medals, with 12 in total, before overtaking Dæhlie by winning his second gold of the Games as part of the Norwegian mixed relay team.

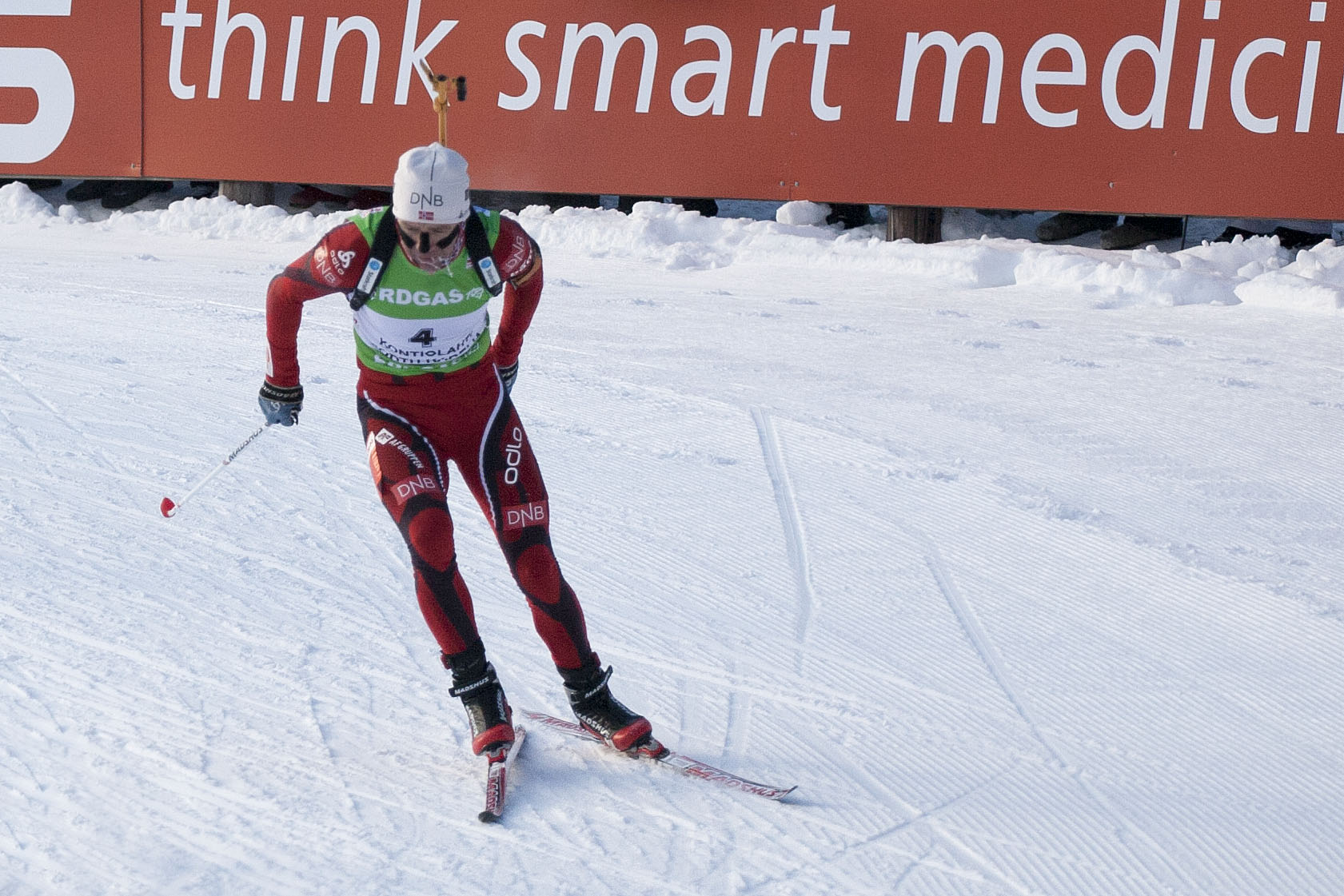
Bjørndalen in Kontiolahti, Finland, 12 February 2012, where he won the pursuit

Bjørndalen has won eight Olympic gold medals, four silver and a bronze. He has also won 20 World Championship gold medals, 14 silver and 11 bronze (more than anybody in biathlon history), along with a record 95 World Cup victories in biathlon and 1 World Cup victory in cross-country skiing, 179 podium finishes in biathlon individual races and 3 in cross-country skiing. He also finished in the top three of the Overall World Cup rankings for a record thirteen successive seasons between the 1996–97 and 2008–09 seasons. In total Ole Einar Bjørndalen has won 44 Norwegian Championship gold medals. He has won 30 gold medals in the Norwegian Championship, biathlon, winter event: 20 individual gold medals: individual (4), sprint (6), pursuit (6), mass start (4) and 10 gold medals in relay and the team event: relay (8) and team (2). Bjørndalen has also achieved 14 individual gold medals in the Norwegian Championship, biathlon, summer event: sprint (7) and pursuit (7).

In January 2018 Arne Botnan, the sporting director for Norwegian biathlon, announced that Bjørndalen would not be selected for the 2018 Winter Olympics, after he failed to achieve the qualifying standard of a top six finish in a World Cup race before the Norwegian Biathlon Association was due to nominate its Olympic squad on the 15th of that month. However, he did travel to the Games after being accredited as part of the Belarusian Olympic delegation as a coach, in order to support Darya Domracheva. On 3 April 2018 Bjørndalen announced his retirement from competition, explaining that his form had been affected by heart murmurs several times during the previous season.

In September 2019, Bjørndalen and Domracheva were appointed as head coach and women's coach respectively of the Chinese biathlon team.

=== 2005–06 World Cup season ===
2005–06 World Cup season results
No.	World Cup location	Individual	Sprint	Pursuit	Mass start	Relay	Mixed relay
1	Östersund, Sweden	—	4	1	—	1	—
2	Hochfilzen, Austria	2	5	—	—	8	—
3	Osrblie, Slovakia	DNS	DNS	DNS	—	—	—
4	Oberhof, Germany	—	DNS	—	DNS	DNS	—
5	Ruhpolding, Germany	—	DNS	DNS	—	DNS	—
6	Antholz-Anterselva, Italy	—	5	5	1	—	—
Biathlon at the 2006 Winter Olympics	Turin, Italy	2	11	2	3	5	—
7	Pokljuka, Slovenia	—	1	1	—	—	2
8	Kontiolahti, Finland	—	16	1	3	—	—
9	Oslo, Norway	—	1	1	1	—	—
Key:"—" denotes discipline not held; DNS—Did not start.

Bjørndalen finished the 2005–06 International Biathlon Union World Cup season in first place, with Frenchman Raphaël Poirée in second place and German Sven Fischer in third. Bjørndalen lay in third place in the standings going into the last three races of the season in Holmenkollen, with Poirée in first, and Fischer in second. However, Bjørndalen won all three races, giving him six victories in the last eight races, and clinching the crystal globe. He also won the pursuit, and the mass start title, and came second in the individual and the sprint. In the pursuit he finished ahead of Fischer by 54 points, and 29 points ahead of Poirée in the mass start. In the individual he finished 41 points behind Michael Greis, and in the sprint he was 5 points behind Tomasz Sikora. Norway finished fourth in the relay.

Bjørndalen closed out the season by winning all three events (sprint, pursuit, and mass start) at the Holmenkollen ski festival biathlon competition. This put his career victories at the ski events to five, having won once both in 2003 (pursuit) and in 2004 (sprint).

=== 2006–07 World Cup season ===
2006–07 World Cup season results
No.	World Cup location	Individual	Sprint	Pursuit	Mass start	Relay	Mixed relay
1	Östersund, Sweden	1	1	1	—	—	—
2	Hochfilzen, Austria	—	1	1	—	DNS	—
3	Hochfilzen, Austria	—	DNS*	—	—	DNS	—
4	Oberhof, Germany	—	30	5	—	DNS	—
5	Ruhpolding, Germany	—	1	—	1	1	—
6	Pokljuka, Slovenia	—	DNS	DNS	DNS	—	—
WCH	Antholz-Anterselva, Italy	32	1	1	4	2	DNS
7	Lahti, Finland	DNS	DNS	DNS	—	—	—
8	Oslo, Norway	4	—	1	1	—	—
9	Khanty-Mansiysk, Russia	—	48	9	4	—	—
*Two sprints were held in Hochfilzen, Bjoerndalen did not enter either. Key:"—" denotes discipline not held; DNS—Did not start; WCH—World Championships

Bjørndalen made a perfect start to the season, winning all of the first five races in Östersund and Hochfilzen. In the fifth race of the season, the pursuit race in Hochfilzen, he won with one of his largest margins ever, more than 2 minutes. On 30 December 2006 Bjørndalen took part in the Biathlon World Team Challenge in Gelsenkirchen in the Veltins Arena. In front of about 51,000 people he won it for fourth time in a row. His partner for second consecutive time was Linda Grubben. They both left their rivals, the Robert family, more than one minute behind.

In Oberhof, coming down from training in the heights, Bjørndalen performed below standard for the season, and finishing only 30th and 5th in the individual competitions. In Ruhpolding he led his teammates to victory in the relay event. He won the two following individual competitions. After competing in the FIS Nordic World Ski Championships Sapporo 2007, he missed several Biathlon World Cup events; after missing eight competitions altogether Bjørndalen finished second in the overall standings, after German Michael Greis.

=== 2008–09 World Cup season ===
2008–09 World Cup season results
No.	World Cup location	Individual	Sprint	Pursuit	Mass start	Relay	Mixed relay
1	Östersund, Sweden	24	4	2	—	—	—
2	Hochfilzen, Austria	—	12	2	—	DNS	—
3	Hochfilzen, Austria	14	DNS	—	—	DNS	—
4	Oberhof, Germany	—	23	—	3	3	—
5	Ruhpolding, Germany	—	1	1	—	1	—
6	Antholz-Anterselva, Italy	—	DNS	DNS	5	—	—
WCH	Pyeongchang, South Korea	1	1	1	4	1	4
7	Vancouver, Canada	18	2	—	—	DNS	—
8	Trondheim, Norway	—	2	1	1	—	—
9	Khanty-Mansiysk, Russia	—	2	2	2	—	—
Key:"—" denotes discipline not held; DNS—Did not start; WCH—World Championships

Bjørndalen started off the season suffering from the effects of long-term illness, but still placed second in both of the pursuit events. He missed the Biathlon World Team Challenge in Gelsenkirchen, focusing on training instead. After the break, he returned with victories in both the sprint and pursuit events in Ruhpolding and a third place in the mass start in Oberhof.

At the Biathlon World Championships 2009 in Pyeongchang, during the men's 12.5 km pursuit, Bjørndalen with at least 15 other competitors accidentally skied the wrong way at the start of the first lap due to the bad marking. Just after leaving the start, the athletes skied over a bridge instead of skiing beside it, which was the right way. A jury meeting decided to give all these athletes a one-minute time penalty, following a complaint from the Russian team. However, another complaint by seven other member states led to the Appeal Jury reverting to the original result. Along with Bjørndalen's first ever 20 km individual World Championship title, he won four out of six possible gold medals (10 km sprint, 12.5 km pursuit, 20 km individual and the 4 × 7.5 km relay).

After the World Championships Bjørndalen came second in the sprint in Vancouver, he took over the world cup overall lead. He followed up with a second place, and two victories at the events in Granåsen, Trondheim (the latter being a mass start where he shot clean). He secured his sixth overall win in the last sprint of the season, in Khanty-Mansiysk where he placed second. In the following event (a pursuit), he was beaten at the finish line by teammate Emil Hegle Svendsen, but won the pursuit cup.

== Personal life ==
Bjørndalen grew up on a farm in Simostranda, the fourth of five children: one of his siblings is fellow biathlete Dag Bjørndalen. Both brothers were part of the Norwegian team that took the silver medal in the men's relay at the 1998 Winter Olympics.

Bjørndalen resides in the village of Obertilliach, Austria. He also used to live in Toblach, Italy, with Italian-Belgian biathlete Nathalie Santer. They started dating in 1998 and married on 27 May 2006. On 4 October 2012, they filed for divorce by mutual consent.

In April 2016, along with announcing that he would continue his career until the 2018 Winter Olympics in Pyeongchang, Bjørndalen confirmed that he was in a relationship with Belarusian biathlete Darya Domracheva, and that she was pregnant with the couple's first child. On 7 July 2016, they married in Sjusjøen, Norway. Their daughter Xenia was born on 1 October 2016. They welcomed a second daughter in 2023.

On 3 April 2018 Bjørndalen announced his retirement from biathlon. Bjørndalen ended his Olympic career after being left off Norway's 2018 team for PyeongChang, thus ending a bid for a seventh Winter Games.

== Endorsement ==
Alongside his career Bjørndalen also has a number of endorsement partnertships. He has been Certina's loyal ambassador since 2011, InstaForex brand ambassador since 2015. Among sports equipment brands that he promotes are Madshus, Odlo, and Casco.

== Awards and honors ==
Ole Einar Bjørndalen won the Aftenposten Gold Medal in 1998. He was named the Norwegian Sportsperson of the Year in 2002 and 2014. For his accomplishments in biathlon and cross-country skiing, Bjørndalen received the Egebergs Ærespris in 2002. Bjørndalen was also awarded with the Fearnleys olympic honorary award in 2002. He was voted Best Male Athlete of 2002 by International Sports Press Association. Ole Einar Bjørndalen was nominated for Laureus World Sportsman of the Year in 2003. He came second, only lost to Lance Armstrong that year, who was later rescinded. In 2008, a nearly three meter tall bronze statue of Bjørndalen, created by sculptor Kirsten Kokkin, was erected in his hometown of Simostranda, Norway. Bjørndalen was awarded the Fair Play Mecenante Award in Castiglion in Fiorentino in Italy in 2009. Bjørndalen was elected Biathlon Athlete of the Year by AIPS Nordic Ski and Biathlon Commission in 2002, 2003, 2005 and 2009. In March 2011, he, Michael Greis and Andrea Henkel were awarded the Holmenkollen Medal, the first biathletes to receive the medal. In February 2014, Bjørndalen was voted Best Male Athlete of the 2014 Winter Olympics by International Sports Press Association. In November 2014, Bjørndalen was awarded Best Male Athlete of the 2014 Winter Olympics by the Association des Comités Nationaux Olympiques.

== Cross-country skiing ==
Bjørndalen first participated in the FIS Cross-Country World Cup in Finland in the 10 kilometre freestyle event in a small town called Muonio in November 1998, finishing 23rd. His first podium place in the FIS Cross-Country World Cup came in Kuopio 25 November 2001, where he finished in 2nd place in the 10 km freestyle event. One month later he once again came in 2nd place, this time losing out to Per Elofsson in the 30 km freestyle mass-start event in Ramsau, Austria.

On 18 November 2006 Bjørndalen made history by becoming the first male biathlete to win a FIS Cross-Country World Cup event in the Swedish town Gällivare. Bjørndalen won the 15 km freestyle event. In 2007 his countryman, and fellow biathlete Lars Berger won the 15 km cross-country event at the World Championship in 2007. Bjørndalen has twice finished on the podium in cross-country world cup relays for Norway: first in Beitostølen in 2003, where his team finished third, and secondly in La Clusaz in France in 2006, where Norway came in 2nd place. In total Bjørndalen has been on the podium 5 times in the Cross-Country World Cup.

In addition, Bjørndalen has won FIS events in cross-country twice. His first win was in 1997 in the 30 kilometre freestyle event in Valdres, Norway, and the second was in the 10 km freestyle event in Beitostølen, Norway in 2006. He has also two 2nd places in a FIS-event: in the 15 km freestyle event in Misurina, Italy in 1998 and in the 10 km freestyle event at Beitostølen in 2004. In addition to this, Bjørndalen has one third place in a FIS event, in the 10 km freestyle at Beitostølen in 2001. Following his two Cross-Country World Cup podium finishes in the 2001–02 season, ahead of the 2002 Winter Olympics he stated that he was hoping to become the first competitor to take Olympic medals in both biathlon and cross-country skiing, however Bjørndalen missed out on a cross-country medal, finishing 5th in the 30 km freestyle cross-country race in Salt Lake City on 9 February 2002. He won Skarverennet in 2006 and 2007, and came in 2nd after Petter Northug in 2008.

== Other victories ==
Ole Einar Bjørndalen won the Beach Volleyball Championship at Laguna Beach in 2001. Bjørndalen has won the World Team Challenge biathlon exhibition event in Gelsenkirchen (held at the Veltins-Arena, the home ground of football club Schalke 04) in 2003, 2004, 2005, 2006. He also won a bronze together with his wife Darya Domracheva in 2018 Ole Einar Bjørndalen finished second in the 2003 Dobbiaco-Cortina, a long-distance cross-country skiing event, (42 km) in Italy in the town of Cortina. He took his second place in the 26th edition of this prestigious event, finishing behind Italy's Costantin Pierluigi, and finishing half a second behind Pierluigi's winning time of 1 hour 43 minutes and 16.5 seconds. In 2008, Bjørndalen won the biathlon exhibition event in Püttlingen together with Kati Wilhelm. He also finished in second place in 2011 alongside Magdalena Neuner. Bjørndalen also got a bronze in this event in 2005 together with Nathalie Santer and in 2010 with Sabrina Buchholz. He won the Blink Festival in Sandnes in 2008. In April 2016, Bjørndalen and Karin Oberhofer won the Champions Race in Tyumen, Russia.

== Biathlon results ==
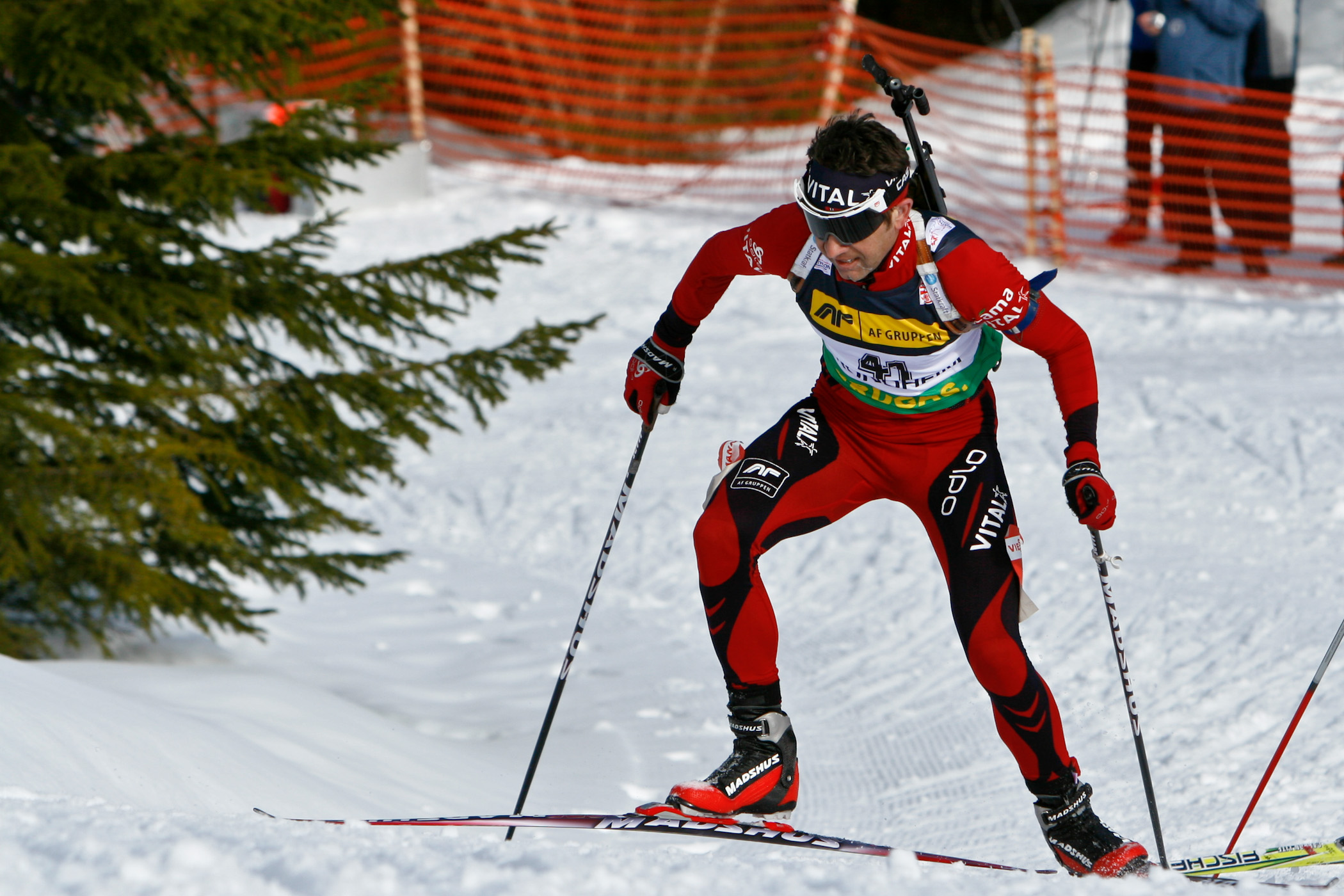
Bjørndalen in Trondheim, March 2009

All results are sourced from the International Biathlon Union.

=== Olympic Winter Games ===
14 medals (8 gold, 4 silver, 2 bronze)

Event	Individual	Sprint	Pursuit	Mass start	Relay	Mixed relay
(Norway) 1994 Lillehammer	36th	28th	—N/a	—N/a	7th	—N/a
(Japan) 1998 Nagano	7th	Gold	—N/a	—N/a	Silver	—N/a
(United States) 2002 Salt Lake City	Gold	Gold	Gold	—N/a	Gold	—N/a
(Italy) 2006 Turin	Silver	11th	Silver	Bronze	5th	—N/a
(Canada) 2010 Vancouver	Silver	17th	7th	27th	Gold	—N/a
(Russia) 2014 Sochi	33rd	Gold	4th	22nd	Bronze	Gold

*Pursuit was first added in 2002, mass start in 2006 and the mixed relay in 2014.

=== World Championships ===
45 medals (20 gold, 14 silver, 11 bronze)

Event	Individual	Sprint	Pursuit*	Mass start*	Team*	Relay	Mixed relay*
(Canada) 1994 Canmore	—	—	—N/a	—N/a	4th	—	—N/a
(Italy) 1995 Antholz-Anterselva	12th	4th	—N/a	—N/a	—	5th	—N/a
(Germany) 1996 Ruhpolding	19th	6th	—N/a	—N/a	4th	4th	—N/a
(Slovakia) 1997 Brezno-Osrblie	6th	9th	Bronze	—N/a	4th	Silver	—N/a
(Slovenia) 1998 Pokljuka	—	—	Silver	—N/a	Gold	—	—N/a
(Finland) 1999 Kontiolahti	4th	19th	5th	Bronze	—N/a	Bronze	—N/a
(Norway) 2000 Oslo	20th	5th	4th	Bronze	—N/a	Silver	—N/a
(Slovenia) 2001 Pokljuka	10th	19th	4th	Silver	—N/a	Bronze	—N/a
(Norway) 2002 Oslo	—	—	—	7th	—N/a	—	—N/a
(Russia) 2003 Khanty-Mansiysk	30th	Gold	8th	Gold	—N/a	4th	—N/a
(Germany) 2004 Oberhof	Bronze	Bronze	Bronze	7th	—N/a	Silver	—N/a
(Austria) 2005 Hochfilzen	6th	Gold	Gold	Gold	—N/a	Gold	—
(Slovenia) 2006 Pokljuka	—	—	—	—	—N/a	—	Silver
(Italy) 2007 Antholz-Anterselva	32nd	Gold	Gold	4th	—N/a	Silver	—
(Sweden) 2008 Östersund	Silver	Bronze	Gold	Silver	—N/a	Silver	—
(South Korea) 2009 Pyeongchang	Gold	Gold	Gold	4th	—N/a	Gold	4th
(Russia) 2010 Khanty-Mansiysk	—	—	—	—	—N/a	—	Silver
(Russia) 2011 Khanty-Mansiysk	6th	22nd	24th	6th	—N/a	Gold	Gold
(Germany) 2012 Ruhpolding	47th	20th	14th	8th	—N/a	Gold	Gold
(Czech Republic) 2013 Nové Město	25th	4th	10th	24th	—N/a	Gold	—
(Finland) 2015 Kontiolahti	6th	19th	5th	4th	—N/a	Silver	—
(Norway) 2016 Oslo	17th	Silver	Silver	Bronze	—N/a	Gold	—
(Austria) 2017 Hochfilzen	47th	8th	Bronze	23rd	—N/a	8th	—

*Team was removed as an event in 1998, and pursuit was added in 1997 with mass start being added in 1999 and the mixed relay was added in 2005.

Event
Event	Non-Team				Team				Total			
Event	1st place, gold medalist(s)	2nd place, silver medalist(s)	3rd place, bronze medalist(s)	Σ	1st place, gold medalist(s)	2nd place, silver medalist(s)	3rd place, bronze medalist(s)	Σ	1st place, gold medalist(s)	2nd place, silver medalist(s)	3rd place, bronze medalist(s)	Σ
Olympic Games	5	3	1	9	3	1	1	5	8	4	2	14
World Championships	11	6	9	26	9	8	2	19	20	14	11	45
Total	16	9	10	35	12	9	3	24	28	18	13	59

=== Overall record ===
Result	Individual	Sprint	Pursuit	Mass start	Relay	Mixed relay	Team	Total
1st Place	8	36	37	14	33	4	1	133
2nd Place	9	24	14	6	19	2	–	74
3rd Place	2	12	8	9	13	–	–	44
Top 10	15	40	31	15	11	1	–	113
11–20	10	31	11	10	1	–	–	63
21–40	16	13	5	5	–	–	–	39
41–50	6	5	–	–	–	–	–	11
Others	8	4	–	–	–	–	–	12
Starts	74	165	104	58	74	6	1	483

*Results in all IBU World Cup races.

=== Junior/Youth World Championships ===
Event	Individual	Sprint	Relay	Team
(Canada) 1992 Canmore	23rd	47th	6th	Bronze
(Germany) 1993 Ruhpolding	Gold	Gold	8th	Gold

=== World Cup ===
Season	Age	Overall		Individual		Sprint		Pursuit		Mass start	
Season	Age	Points	Position	Points	Position	Points	Position	Points	Position	Points	Position
1992–93	19	-	62nd	–	–	–	–	—N/a	—N/a	—N/a	—N/a
1993–94	20	-	30th	–	–	–	–	—N/a	—N/a	—N/a	—N/a
1994–95	21	178	4th	–	–	115	1st	—N/a	—N/a	—N/a	—N/a
1995–96	22	141	9th	–	–	104	6th	—N/a	—N/a	—N/a	—N/a
1996–97	23	303	2nd	67	8th	158	1st	78	3rd	—N/a	—N/a
1997–98	24	289	1st	71	3rd	185	1st	–	–	—N/a	—N/a
1998–99	25	397	2nd	48	2nd	130	5th	174	3rd	45	3rd
1999–00	26	448	2nd	–	–	161	1st	200	1st	51	9th
2000–01	27	911	2nd	110	2nd	393	1st	272	2nd	136	2nd
2001–02	28	692	3rd	108	2nd	219	5th	315	3rd	50	17th
2002–03	29	737	1st	16	34th	328	1st	230	1st	150	1st
2003–04	30	901	2nd	75	6th	341	2nd	315	2nd	138	2nd
2004–05	31	923	1st	130	1st	330	1st	317	2nd	146	1st
2005–06	32	814	1st	92	2nd	253	2nd	283	1st	186	1st
2006–07	33	732	2nd	90	6th	201	10th	265	2nd	180	1st
2007–08	34	869	1st	59	7th	383	1st	247	1st	180	1st
2008–09	35	1080	1st	110	4th	372	1st	342	1st	199	2nd
2009–10	36	593	10th	54	25th	265	7th	108	16th	152	7th
2010–11	37	586	10th	126	4th	205	14th	113	20th	142	7th
2011–12	38	548	16th	–	–	199	18th	239	5th	110	17th
2012–13	39	463	22nd	33	35th	173	19th	167	16th	90	26th
2013–14	40	556	6th	10	44th	260	4th	194	9th	92	8th
2014–15	41	524	14th	76	11th	207	14th	134	19th	107	16th
2015–16	42	577	13th	84	7th	199	12th	167	14th	127	11th
2016–17	43	631	9th	83	9th	218	8th	183	17th	147	7th
2017–18	44	120	43rd	23	32nd	54	43rd	37	46th	6	43rd

*Pursuit was added as an event in the 1996–97 season, and mass start was added in the 1998–99 season.

=== Individual victories ===
95 victories (36 Sp, 37 Pu, 8 In, 14 MS); one victory at Winter Olympics 2014 isn't counted as a World Cup victory.

Season	Date	Location	Discipline	Level
1995–96; 1 victory (1 In)	11 January 1996	(Italy) Antholz-Anterselva	20 km individual	Biathlon World Cup
1996–97; 3 victories (2 Sp, 1 Pu)	4 January 1997	(Germany) Oberhof	10 km sprint	Biathlon World Cup
1996–97; 3 victories (2 Sp, 1 Pu)	5 January 1997	(Germany) Oberhof	12.5 km pursuit	Biathlon World Cup
1996–97; 3 victories (2 Sp, 1 Pu)	11 January 1997	(Germany) Ruhpolding	10 km sprint	Biathlon World Cup
1997–98; 2 victories (2 Sp)	17 January 1998	(Italy) Antholz-Anterselva	10 km sprint	Biathlon World Cup
1997–98; 2 victories (2 Sp)	18 February 1998	(Japan) Nagano-Nozawa Onsen	10 km sprint	Winter Olympic Games
1998–99; 3 victories (1 Sp. 2 Pu)	11 December 1998	(Austria) Hochfilzen	10 km sprint	Biathlon World Cup
1998–99; 3 victories (1 Sp. 2 Pu)	9 January 1999	(Germany) Oberhof	12.5 km pursuit	Biathlon World Cup
1998–99; 3 victories (1 Sp. 2 Pu)	23 January 1999	(Italy) Antholz-Anterselva	12.5 km pursuit	Biathlon World Cup
1999–2000; 5 victories (1 Sp, 3 Pu, 1 In)	2 December 1999	(Austria) Hochfilzen	20 km individual	Biathlon World Cup
1999–2000; 5 victories (1 Sp, 3 Pu, 1 In)	4 December 1999	(Austria) Hochfilzen	12.5 km pursuit	Biathlon World Cup
1999–2000; 5 victories (1 Sp, 3 Pu, 1 In)	6 January 2000	(Germany) Oberhof	10 km sprint	Biathlon World Cup
1999–2000; 5 victories (1 Sp, 3 Pu, 1 In)	7 January 2000	(Germany) Oberhof	12.5 km pursuit	Biathlon World Cup
1999–2000; 5 victories (1 Sp, 3 Pu, 1 In)	22 January 2000	(Italy) Antholz-Anterselva	12.5 km pursuit	Biathlon World Cup
2000–01; 8 victories (4 Sp, 2 Pu, 1 In, 1 MS)	1 December 2000	(Italy) Antholz-Anterselva	10 km sprint	Biathlon World Cup
2000–01; 8 victories (4 Sp, 2 Pu, 1 In, 1 MS)	17 December 2000	(Italy) Antholz-Anterselva	12.5 km pursuit	Biathlon World Cup
2000–01; 8 victories (4 Sp, 2 Pu, 1 In, 1 MS)	12 January 2001	(Germany) Ruhpolding	10 km sprint	Biathlon World Cup
2000–01; 8 victories (4 Sp, 2 Pu, 1 In, 1 MS)	18 January 2001	(Italy) Antholz-Anterselva	10 km sprint	Biathlon World Cup
2000–01; 8 victories (4 Sp, 2 Pu, 1 In, 1 MS)	21 January 2001	(Italy) Antholz-Anterselva	15 km mass start	Biathlon World Cup
2000–01; 8 victories (4 Sp, 2 Pu, 1 In, 1 MS)	28 February 2001	(United States) Salt Lake City	20 km individual	Biathlon World Cup
2000–01; 8 victories (4 Sp, 2 Pu, 1 In, 1 MS)	2 March 2001	(United States) Salt Lake City	10 km sprint	Biathlon World Cup
2000–01; 8 victories (4 Sp, 2 Pu, 1 In, 1 MS)	3 March 2001	(United States) Salt Lake City	12.5 km pursuit	Biathlon World Cup
2001–02; 5 victories (2 Sp, 2 Pu, 1 In)	6 December 2001	(Austria) Hochfilzen	10 km sprint	Biathlon World Cup
2001–02; 5 victories (2 Sp, 2 Pu, 1 In)	9 December 2001	(Austria) Hochfilzen	12.5 km pursuit	Biathlon World Cup
2001–02; 5 victories (2 Sp, 2 Pu, 1 In)	11 February 2002	(United States) Salt Lake City	20 km individual	Winter Olympic Games
2001–02; 5 victories (2 Sp, 2 Pu, 1 In)	13 February 2002	(United States) Salt Lake City	10 km sprint	Winter Olympic Games
2001–02; 5 victories (2 Sp, 2 Pu, 1 In)	16 February 2002	(United States) Salt Lake City	12.5 km pursuit	Winter Olympic Games
2002–03; 11 victories (4 Sp, 4 Pu, 3 MS)	8 December 2002	(Sweden) Östersund	12.5 km pursuit	Biathlon World Cup
2002–03; 11 victories (4 Sp, 4 Pu, 3 MS)	14 December 2002	(Sweden) Östersund	10 km sprint	Biathlon World Cup
2002–03; 11 victories (4 Sp, 4 Pu, 3 MS)	15 December 2002	(Sweden) Östersund	12.5 km pursuit	Biathlon World Cup
2002–03; 11 victories (4 Sp, 4 Pu, 3 MS)	9 January 2003	(Germany) Oberhof	10 km sprint	Biathlon World Cup
2002–03; 11 victories (4 Sp, 4 Pu, 3 MS)	12 January 2003	(Germany) Oberhof	15 km mass start	Biathlon World Cup
2002–03; 11 victories (4 Sp, 4 Pu, 3 MS)	18 January 2003	(Germany) Ruhpolding	10 km sprint	Biathlon World Cup
2002–03; 11 victories (4 Sp, 4 Pu, 3 MS)	19 January 2003	(Germany) Ruhpolding	12.5 km pursuit	Biathlon World Cup
2002–03; 11 victories (4 Sp, 4 Pu, 3 MS)	9 February 2003	(Finland) Lahti	15 km mass start	Biathlon World Cup
2002–03; 11 victories (4 Sp, 4 Pu, 3 MS)	16 February 2003	(Norway) Oslo Holmenkollen	12.5 km pursuit	Biathlon World Cup
2002–03; 11 victories (4 Sp, 4 Pu, 3 MS)	15 March 2003	(Russia) Khanty-Mansiysk	10 km sprint	Biathlon World Championships
2002–03; 11 victories (4 Sp, 4 Pu, 3 MS)	23 March 2003	(Russia) Khanty-Mansiysk	15 km mass start	Biathlon World Championships
2003–04; 5 victories (1 Sp, 4 Pu)	4 December 2003	(Finland) Kontiolahti	10 km sprint	Biathlon World Cup
2003–04; 5 victories (1 Sp, 4 Pu)	7 December 2003	(Finland) Kontiolahti	12.5 km pursuit	Biathlon World Cup
2003–04; 5 victories (1 Sp, 4 Pu)	14 December 2003	(Austria) Hochfilzen	12.5 km pursuit	Biathlon World Cup
2003–04; 5 victories (1 Sp, 4 Pu)	10 January 2004	(Slovenia) Pokljuka	12.5 km pursuit	Biathlon World Cup
2003–04; 5 victories (1 Sp, 4 Pu)	18 January 2004	(Germany) Ruhpolding	12.5 km pursuit	Biathlon World Cup
2004–05; 12 victories (5 Sp, 4 Pu, 1 In, 2 MS)	2 December 2004	(Norway) Beitostølen	10 km sprint	Biathlon World Cup
2004–05; 12 victories (5 Sp, 4 Pu, 1 In, 2 MS)	11 December 2004	(Norway) Oslo Holmenkollen	10 km sprint	Biathlon World Cup
2004–05; 12 victories (5 Sp, 4 Pu, 1 In, 2 MS)	15 January 2005	(Germany) Ruhpolding	10 km sprint	Biathlon World Cup
2004–05; 12 victories (5 Sp, 4 Pu, 1 In, 2 MS)	16 January 2005	(Germany) Ruhpolding	12.5 km pursuit	Biathlon World Cup
2004–05; 12 victories (5 Sp, 4 Pu, 1 In, 2 MS)	19 January 2005	(Italy) Antholz-Anterselva	20 km individual	Biathlon World Cup
2004–05; 12 victories (5 Sp, 4 Pu, 1 In, 2 MS)	21 January 2005	(Italy) Antholz-Anterselva	10 km sprint	Biathlon World Cup
2004–05; 12 victories (5 Sp, 4 Pu, 1 In, 2 MS)	23 January 2005	(Italy) Antholz-Anterselva	12.5 km pursuit	Biathlon World Cup
2004–05; 12 victories (5 Sp, 4 Pu, 1 In, 2 MS)	20 February 2005	(Slovenia) Pokljuka	15 km mass start	Biathlon World Cup
2004–05; 12 victories (5 Sp, 4 Pu, 1 In, 2 MS)	5 March 2005	(Austria) Hochfilzen	10 km sprint	Biathlon World Championships
2004–05; 12 victories (5 Sp, 4 Pu, 1 In, 2 MS)	6 March 2005	(Austria) Hochfilzen	12.5 km pursuit	Biathlon World Championships
2004–05; 12 victories (5 Sp, 4 Pu, 1 In, 2 MS)	13 March 2005	(Austria) Hochfilzen	15 km mass start	Biathlon World Championships
2004–05; 12 victories (5 Sp, 4 Pu, 1 In, 2 MS)	17 March 2005	(Russia) Khanty-Mansiysk	12.5 km pursuit	Biathlon World Cup
2005–06; 8 victories (2 Sp, 4 Pu, 2 MS)	27 November 2005	(Sweden) Östersund	12.5 km pursuit	Biathlon World Cup
2005–06; 8 victories (2 Sp, 4 Pu, 2 MS)	22 January 2006	(Italy) Antholz-Anterselva	15 km mass start	Biathlon World Cup
2005–06; 8 victories (2 Sp, 4 Pu, 2 MS)	8 March 2006	(Slovenia) Pokljuka	10 km sprint	Biathlon World Cup
2005–06; 8 victories (2 Sp, 4 Pu, 2 MS)	11 March 2006	(Slovenia) Pokljuka	12.5 km pursuit	Biathlon World Cup
2005–06; 8 victories (2 Sp, 4 Pu, 2 MS)	18 March 2006	(Finland) Kontiolahti	12.5 km pursuit	Biathlon World Cup
2005–06; 8 victories (2 Sp, 4 Pu, 2 MS)	23 March 2006	(Norway) Oslo Holmenkollen	10 km sprint	Biathlon World Cup
2005–06; 8 victories (2 Sp, 4 Pu, 2 MS)	25 March 2006	(Norway) Oslo Holmenkollen	12.5 km pursuit	Biathlon World Cup
2005–06; 8 victories (2 Sp, 4 Pu, 2 MS)	26 March 2006	(Norway) Oslo Holmenkollen	15 km mass start	Biathlon World Cup
2006–07; 11 victories (4 Sp, 4 Pu, 1 In, 2 MS)	30 November 2006	(Sweden) Östersund	20 km individual	Biathlon World Cup
2006–07; 11 victories (4 Sp, 4 Pu, 1 In, 2 MS)	2 December 2006	(Sweden) Östersund	10 km sprint	Biathlon World Cup
2006–07; 11 victories (4 Sp, 4 Pu, 1 In, 2 MS)	3 December 2006	(Sweden) Östersund	12.5 km pursuit	Biathlon World Cup
2006–07; 11 victories (4 Sp, 4 Pu, 1 In, 2 MS)	8 December 2006	(Austria) Hochfilzen	10 km sprint	Biathlon World Cup
2006–07; 11 victories (4 Sp, 4 Pu, 1 In, 2 MS)	9 December 2006	(Austria) Hochfilzen	12.5 km pursuit	Biathlon World Cup
2006–07; 11 victories (4 Sp, 4 Pu, 1 In, 2 MS)	13 January 2007	(Germany) Ruhpolding	10 km sprint	Biathlon World Cup
2006–07; 11 victories (4 Sp, 4 Pu, 1 In, 2 MS)	14 January 2007	(Germany) Ruhpolding	15 km mass start	Biathlon World Cup
2006–07; 11 victories (4 Sp, 4 Pu, 1 In, 2 MS)	3 February 2007	(Italy) Antholz-Anterselva	10 km sprint	Biathlon World Championships
2006–07; 11 victories (4 Sp, 4 Pu, 1 In, 2 MS)	4 February 2007	(Italy) Antholz-Anterselva	12.5 km pursuit	Biathlon World Championships
2006–07; 11 victories (4 Sp, 4 Pu, 1 In, 2 MS)	10 March 2007	(Norway) Oslo Holmenkollen	12.5 km pursuit	Biathlon World Cup
2006–07; 11 victories (4 Sp, 4 Pu, 1 In, 2 MS)	11 March 2007	(Norway) Oslo Holmenkollen	15 km mass start	Biathlon World Cup
2007–08; 7 victories (3 Sp, 2 Pu, 2 MS)	1 December 2007	(Finland) Kontiolahti	10 km sprint	Biathlon World Cup
2007–08; 7 victories (3 Sp, 2 Pu, 2 MS)	8 December 2007	(Austria) Hochfilzen	12.5 km pursuit	Biathlon World Cup
2007–08; 7 victories (3 Sp, 2 Pu, 2 MS)	15 December 2007	(Slovenia) Pokljuka	10 km sprint	Biathlon World Cup
2007–08; 7 victories (3 Sp, 2 Pu, 2 MS)	6 January 2008	(Germany) Oberhof	15 km mass start	Biathlon World Cup
2007–08; 7 victories (3 Sp, 2 Pu, 2 MS)	20 January 2008	(Italy) Antholz-Anterselva	15 km mass start	Biathlon World Cup
2007–08; 7 victories (3 Sp, 2 Pu, 2 MS)	10 February 2008	(Sweden) Östersund	12.5 km pursuit	Biathlon World Championships
2007–08; 7 victories (3 Sp, 2 Pu, 2 MS)	6 March 2008	(Russia) Khanty-Mansiysk	10 km sprint	Biathlon World Cup
2008–09; 7 victories (2 Sp, 3 Pu, 1 In, 1 MS)	17 January 2009	(Germany) Ruhpolding	10 km sprint	Biathlon World Cup
2008–09; 7 victories (2 Sp, 3 Pu, 1 In, 1 MS)	18 January 2009	(Germany) Ruhpolding	12.5 km pursuit	Biathlon World Cup
2008–09; 7 victories (2 Sp, 3 Pu, 1 In, 1 MS)	14 February 2009	(South Korea) Pyeongchang	10 km sprint	Biathlon World Championships
2008–09; 7 victories (2 Sp, 3 Pu, 1 In, 1 MS)	15 February 2009	(South Korea) Pyeongchang	12.5 km pursuit	Biathlon World Championships
2008–09; 7 victories (2 Sp, 3 Pu, 1 In, 1 MS)	17 February 2009	(South Korea) Pyeongchang	20 km individual	Biathlon World Championships
2008–09; 7 victories (2 Sp, 3 Pu, 1 In, 1 MS)	21 March 2009	(Norway) Trondheim	12.5 km pursuit	Biathlon World Cup
2008–09; 7 victories (2 Sp, 3 Pu, 1 In, 1 MS)	22 March 2009	(Norway) Trondheim	15 km mass start	Biathlon World Cup
2009–10; 3 victories (2 Sp, 1 MS)	5 December 2009	(Sweden) Östersund	10 km sprint	Biathlon World Cup
2009–10; 3 victories (2 Sp, 1 MS)	11 December 2009	(Austria) Hochfilzen	10 km sprint	Biathlon World Cup
2009–10; 3 victories (2 Sp, 1 MS)	10 January 2010	(Germany) Oberhof	15 km mass start	Biathlon World Cup
2010–11; 1 victory (1 Pu)	5 December 2010	(Sweden) Östersund	12.5 km pursuit	Biathlon World Cup
2011–12; 1 victory (1 Pu)	12 February 2012	(Finland) Kontiolahti	12.5 km pursuit	Biathlon World Cup
2013–14; 1 victory (1 Sp)	8 February 2014	(Russia) Sochi	10 km sprint	Winter Olympic Games
2015–16; 1 victory (1 In)	2 December 2015	(Sweden) Östersund	20 km individual	Biathlon World Cup

*Results are from UIPMB and IBU races which include the Biathlon World Cup, Biathlon World Championships and the Winter Olympic Games.

==== Victories by year ====
Year	Ranking overall	Number of victories
2017–18	43	–
2016–17	9	–
2015–16	13	1
2014–15	14	–
2013–14	6	1
2012–13	22	–
2011–12	16	1
2010–11	10	1
2009–10	10	3
2008–09	1	7
2007–08	1	7
2006–07	2	11 + 1
2005–06	1	8
2004–05	1	12
2003–04	2	5
2002–03	1	11
2001–02	3	5
2000–01	2	8
1999–00	2	5
1998–99	2	3
1997–98	1	2
1996–97	2	3
1995–96	9	1
1994–95	4	–
1993–94	30	–
1992–93	62	–
Total	6 victories	95 + 1

== Shooting ==
Bjørndalen is a solid shooter, but is generally outside the top twenty marksmen. Bjørndalen finished the 2005–06 season with a shooting percentage of 84%, hitting 292 out of 345 possible targets, that placed him in 36th position for shooting accuracy. His shooting record for both prone and standing were practically identical, 146/172 in the prone and 146/173 in the standing position. In the individual disciplines, he shot 92% in the individual, 89% in the sprint, 96% in the pursuit, 93% in the mass start and 96% in the relay.

In the 2004–05 season Bjørndalen was the 16th best shot with an 85% success rate, the second best Norwegian behind Egil Gjelland. He hit 331 targets out of a possible 364. His prone like most biathletes was much better than his standing shoot, he hit 169/180 (92%) in the prone and 163/184 (81%) in the standing. He had an average of 88% in the individual, sprint and relay, a 91% hit rate in the mass start but only 79% in the pursuit. During his career in 1999–00 he averaged 82%, in 2000–01 78%, 2001–02 74%, 2002–03 86% and in 2003–04 he hit 80% of the targets, however in those five years his standing shoot was the same or better than his prone shoot. In comparison, his greatest rival Raphaël Poirée averaged 87% in 2004–05 and 86% in 2005–06. Nikolay Kruglov was the best shot in 2004–05 with a 91% success rate, with Ricco Groß in second with 89%, and in 2005 Julien Robert was best with a 93% average and Groß again second with 91%.

=== Shooting statistics ===
Statistics sourced from the International Biathlon Union.

Shooting	2004–05	2005–06	2006–07	2007–08	2008–09	2009–10	2010–11	2011–12	2012–13	2013–14	2014–15	2015–16	2016–17
Overall	85%	84%	84%	83%	85%	83%	86%	80%			85%	84%	85%
Prone position	89%	84%	85%	84%	85%	87%	89%	85%			88%	84%	86%
Standing position	81%	84%	84%	82%	86%	80%	83%	75%			82%	84%	84%

and

== Cross-country skiing results ==
All results are sourced from the International Ski Federation (FIS).

=== Olympic Games ===
Year	Age	15 km	Pursuit	30 km	50 km	Sprint	4 × 10 km relay
2002	28	—	—	5	—	—	—

=== World Championships ===
Year	Age	15 km individual	30 km skiathlon	50 km mass start	Sprint	4 × 10 km relay	Team sprint
2005	31	11	—	—	—	—	—
2007	33	13	—	—	—	—	—

=== World Cup ===
==== Season standings ====
Season	Age	Discipline standings				Ski Tour standings		
Season	Age	Overall	Distance	Long Distance	Sprint	Nordic Opening	Tour de Ski	World Cup Final
1999	25	63	—N/a	48	89	—N/a	—N/a	—N/a
2002	28	29	—N/a	—N/a	—	—N/a	—N/a	—N/a
2003	29	100	—N/a	—N/a	—	—N/a	—N/a	—N/a
2004	30	108	69	—N/a	—	—N/a	—N/a	—N/a
2005	31	64	39	—N/a	—	—N/a	—N/a	—N/a
2007	33	46	25	—N/a	—	—N/a	—	—N/a
2008	34	81	49	—N/a	—	—N/a	—	—
2011	37	153	97	—N/a	—	—	—	—

==== Individual podiums ====
- 1 victory – (1 WC)
- 3 podiums – (3 WC)

No.	Season	Date	Location	Race	Level	Place
1	2001–02	25 November 2001	Kuopio, Finland	10 km Individual F	World Cup	2nd
2	2001–02	22 December 2001	Ramsau, Austria	30 km Mass Start F	World Cup	2nd
3	2006–07	18 November 2006	Gällivare, Sweden	15 km Individual F	World Cup	1st

==== Team podiums ====
- 3 podiums – (3 RL)

No.	Season	Date	Location	Race	Level	Place	Teammates
1	1998–99	29 November 1998	Muonio, Finland	4 × 10 km Relay F	World Cup	2nd	Skjeldal / Dæhlie / Hetland
2	2003–04	23 November 2003	Beitostølen, Norway	4 × 10 km Relay C/F	World Cup	3rd	Estil / Bjonviken / Andresen
3	2006–07	17 December 2006	La Clusaz, France	4 × 10 km Relay C/F	World Cup	2nd	Hetland / Rønning / Northug

== Equipment ==
Bjørndalen uses Madshus skis, boots and poles. He uses Rottefella NNN bindings. His gloves and base layer are from Odlo, and he uses Casco glasses.

During the off-season in 2006 Bjørndalen was testing a new ski boot that had a high heel in the Torsby ski tunnel with boot manufacturers Madshus. The theory is that it forces the knee more forward for better position and it incorporates the large gluteal muscles.

== See also ==
- List of multiple Winter Olympic medalists
- List of multiple Olympic gold medalists
- List of multiple Olympic gold medalists at a single Games

Awards
Preceded by Olaf Tufte; Magnus Carlsen	Norwegian Sportsperson of the Year; 2002; 2014	Succeeded by Petter Solberg; Petter Northug
Records
Preceded by (Norway) Bjørn Dæhlie	Athletes with the most medals at Winter Olympics; 2014–2018	Succeeded by (Norway) Marit Bjørgen
