= Gunnar Kalrasten =

Norwegian politician

Gunnar Kalrasten (5 September 1905 – 5 May 1964) was a Norwegian politician for the Labour Party.

He was born in Biri.

He was elected to the Norwegian Parliament from Oppland in 1950, and was re-elected on three occasions. He had previously been a deputy representative in the period 1945–1949. During this term he served twice as a regular representative meanwhile Olav Meisdalshagen and later Lars Magnus Moen were appointed to the Cabinet. He died in 1964 before the end of his last term, and was replaced by Per Mellesmo.

Kalrasten was deputy mayor of Biri municipality in the periods 1945–1947 and 1947–1951.
