= Biathlon World Championships 2009 – Men's sprint =

These are the official results of the men's 10 km sprint event at the Biathlon World Championships 2009 in Pyeongchang, South Korea.

rank	name	time	penalties
1	(Norway) Ole Einar Bjørndalen	24:16.5	2 (1+1)
2	(Norway) Lars Berger	24:17.7	2 (1+1)
3	(Norway) Halvard Hanevold	24:29.0	0 (0+0)
4	(Norway) Alexander Os	24:41.1	1 (1+0)
5	(Russia) Maxim Tchoudov	24:45.6	0 (0+0)
6	(France) Simon Fourcade	25:06.6	1 (0+1)
7	(Germany) Michael Greis	25:10.2	2 (1+1)
8	(Austria) Simon Eder	25:15.7	1 (0+1)
9	(Switzerland) Simon Hallenbarter	25:28.4	1 (1+0)
10	(Slovenia) Janez Marič	25:35.5	1 (1+0)
11	(United States) Tim Burke	25:36.4	2 (0+2)
12	(Ukraine) Andriy Deryzemlya	25:36.7	2 (2+0)
13	(Slovenia) Klemen Bauer	25:38.5	3 (3+0)
14	(Germany) Michael Rösch	25:38.6	2 (0+2)
14	(Croatia) Jakov Fak	25:38.6	1 (0+1)
16	(Poland) Tomasz Sikora	25:43.3	3 (1+2)
17	(Austria) Dominik Landertinger	25:45.4	3 (1+2)
18	(France) Martin Fourcade	25:48.6	2 (2+0)
19	(Italy) Markus Windisch	25:56.5	2 (1+1)
20	(Slovakia) Pavol Hurajt	25:56.6	2 (1+1)
21	(Sweden) Magnús Jónsson	25:58.5	2 (2+0)
22	(Germany) Christoph Stephan	25:59.6	3 (1+2)
23	(Italy) Christian Martinelli	26:01.0	1 (0+1)
24	(Russia) Andrei Makoveev	26:01.5	2 (0+2)
25	(Latvia) Ilmārs Bricis	26:01.8	3 (2+1)
26	(Sweden) Mattias Nilsson	26:02.1	2 (0+2)
27	(Italy) Christian de Lorenzi	26:06.3	2 (0+2)
28	(Ukraine) Roman Pryma	26:09.1	2 (0+2)
29	(Austria) Daniel Mesotitsch	26:09.3	3 (0+3)
30	(Switzerland) Ivan Joller	26:10.9	0 (0+0)
31	(Belarus) Sergey Novikov	26:17.9	1 (0+1)
32	(Czech Republic) Michal Šlesingr	26:18.8	2 (1+1)
33	(Kazakhstan) Alexsandr Chervyhkov	26:21.4	1 (1+0)
34	(China) Zhang Qing	26:23.0	0 (0+0)
35	(Belarus) Aleksandr Syman	26:24.2	2 (0+2)
36	(Bulgaria) Krasimir Anev	26:24.3	1 (1+0)
37	(Czech Republic) Jaroslav Soukup	26:25.6	3 (1+2)
38	(Russia) Ivan Tcherezov	26:26.5	1 (1+0)
39	(Italy) Rene Laurent Vuillermoz	26:26.7	3 (2+1)
40	(Sweden) Björn Ferry	26:30.5	3 (2+1)
41	(France) Vincent Defrasne	26:42.5	2 (0+2)
42	(Canada) Jean Philippe Leguellec	26:42.6	2 (2+0)
43	(France) Vincent Jay	26:46.9	1 (0+1)
44	(Ukraine) Vyacheslav Derkach	26:47.5	3 (0+3)
45	(Finland) Paavo Puurunen	26:51.0	2 (0+2)
46	(Finland) Marko Juhani Mänttäri	26:52.5	1 (1+0)
47	(Russia) Evgeny Ustyugov	26:53.1	3 (2+1)
48	(Canada) Robin Clegg	26:54.1	2 (0+2)
48	(Czech Republic) Zdeněk Vítek	26:54.1	4 (0+4)
50	(Japan) Junji Nagai	26:54.2	1 (1+0)
50	(Estonia) Priit Viks	26:54.2	2 (1+1)
52	(Belarus) Rustam Valiullin	26:54.9	4 (1+3)
53	(Germany) Alexander Wolf	26:55.1	2 (1+1)
54	(Finland) Timo Antila	27:02.2	3 (2+1)
55	(United States) Lowell Bailey	27:04.1	4 (2+2)
56	(Slovakia) Marek Matiasko	27:07.0	3 (1+2)
57	(United States) Russell Currier	27:12.2	4 (3+1)
58	(Latvia) Edgars Piksons	27:16.7	2 (0+2)
59	(Japan) Tatsumi Kasahara	27:18.9	2 (1+1)
60	(China) Zhang Chengye	27:20.7	2 (0+2)
61	(Slovakia) Dušan Šimočko	27:20.8	4 (3+1)
62	(Japan) Hidenori Isa	27:21.4	3 (1+2)
63	(Czech Republic) Tomas Holubec	27:21.7	3 (2+1)
64	(Estonia) Indrek Tobreluts	27:24.4	4 (2+2)
65	(Switzerland) Thomas Frei	27:25.2	3 (1+2)
66	(Russia) Nikolay Kruglov, Jr.	27:26.0	3 (2+1)
67	(Estonia) Roland Lessing	27:28.9	4 (2+2)
68	(Poland) Krzysztof Plywaczyk	27:29.4	2 (0+2)
69	(United States) Jeremy Teela	27:29.6	4 (3+1)
70	(Estonia) Kauri Koiv	27:32.3	4 (2+2)
71	(Switzerland) Matthias Simmen	27:35.7	3 (1+2)
72	(United Kingdom) Kevin Kane	27:38.8	2 (1+1)
73	(Slovakia) Matej Kazar	27:40.2	4 (2+2)
74	(Latvia) Kristaps Libietis	27:40.7	2 (0+2)
75	(Kazakhstan) Dias Keneshev	27:41.6	2 (0+2)
76	(Ukraine) Olexander Bilanenko	27:44.3	4 (2+2)
77	(Finland) Jouni Kinnunen	27:49.1	1 (1+0)
78	(Bulgaria) Mihail Kletcherov	27:54.4	2 (0+2)
79	(Sweden) Carl Johan Bergman	27:55.1	5 (2+3)
80	(Canada) Brendan Green	28:07.1	5 (3+2)
81	(Bulgaria) Martin Bogdanov	28:07.3	3 (2+1)
82	(Canada) Scott Perras	28:09.2	3 (2+1)
83	(Slovenia) Peter Dokl	28:10.6	4 (1+3)
84	(Bulgaria) Vladimir Iliev	28:15.2	4 (4+0)
85	(Belarus) Evgeny Abramenko	28:20.1	2 (0+2)
86	(Netherlands) Herbert Cool	28:20.9	2 (0+2)
87	(Greece) Athanassios Tsakiris	28:26.9	2 (1+1)
88	(Kazakhstan) Sergey Naumik	28:27.4	4 (1+3)
89	(Slovenia) Vasja Rupnik	28:40.1	6 (3+3)
90	(Poland) Adam Kwak	28:40.7	3 (1+2)
91	(Poland) Sebastian Witek	28:43.2	4 (1+3)
92	(United Kingdom) Simon Allanson	29:06.2	3 (2+1)
93	(Kazakhstan) Yan Savitskiy	29:09.2	4 (2+2)
94	(Spain) Pedro Quintana Arias	29:27.4	1 (0+1)
95	(Hungary) Karoly Gombos	29:30.7	4 (0+4)
96	(South Korea) Lee In-Bok	29:34.7	4 (2+2)
97	(North Macedonia) Darko Damjanovski	29:36.6	4 (1+3)
98	(Japan) Satoru Abe	29:38.8	5 (3+2)
99	(China) Li Zhonghai	29:50.7	5 (2+3)
100	(Serbia) Damir Rastić	29:59.9	4 (1+3)
101	(Moldova) Victor Pinzaru	30:07.3	4 (1+3)
102	(South Korea) Park Byung-Joo	30:11.3	7 (3+4)
103	(Greenland) Oystein Slettemark	30:13.9	5 (4+1)
104	(Serbia) Edin Hodžić	30:21.5	3 (1+2)
105	(Moldova) Serghei Balan	30:24.6	3 (1+2)
106	(South Korea) Han Kyung-Hee	30:25.4	3 (1+2)
107	(Australia) Mark Raymond	30:35.2	5 (3+2)
108	(Greenland) Kristian Kristoffersen	30:39.4	3 (1+2)
109	(Hungary) Imre Tagscherer	30:42.2	6 (3+3)
110	(Australia) Alexei Almoukov	30:43.1	4 (3+1)
111	(Serbia) Milanko Petrović	30:54.1	5 (2+3)
112	(North Macedonia) Gjorgji Icoski	30:58.1	4 (2+2)
113	(South Korea) Jun Je-Uk	30:58.7	5 (2+3)
114	(United Kingdom) Pete Beyer	31:20.2	2 (0+2)
115	(Hungary) Csaba Cseke	31:25.6	3 (1+2)
116	(Latvia) Janis Pleiksnis	31:46.7	8 (3+5)
117	(Serbia) Nikola Jeremić	31:49.2	0 (0+0)
118	(Greece) Efstathios Kiourkenidis	32:09.0	6 (2+4)
119	(Hungary) Balazs Gond	32:09.5	5 (4+1)
DNF	(United Kingdom) Lee-Steve Jackson		
DNF	(China) Haibin Cheng		
DNF	(Austria) Christoph Sumann		
DSQ	(Romania) Roland Gerbacea		
