= 1987–88 Biathlon World Cup =

Biathlon competition

1987–88 World Cup
| Discipline | Men | Women |
| Overall | (West Germany) Fritz Fischer | (Norway) Anne Elvebakk |
| Nations Cup | West Germany | Bulgaria |

Competition

The 1987–88 Biathlon World Cup was a multi-race tournament over a season of biathlon, organised by the UIPMB (Union Internationale de Pentathlon Moderne et Biathlon). The season started on 17 December 1987 in Hochfilzen, Austria, and ended on 20 March 1988 in Jyväskylä, Finland. It was the 11th season of the Biathlon World Cup. The women's European Cup changed its name to World Cup.

The first round of the World Cup in Hochfilzen had scheduled individuals, sprints and relays, but the sprints and relays were cancelled due to heavy rainfall destroying the tracks. The sprint races were later held in Keuruu, with the rest of that World Cup round being held in Jyväskylä.

== Calendar ==
Below is the World Cup calendar for the 1987–88 season.

| Location | Date | Individual | Sprint | Relay |
|---|---|---|---|---|
| (Austria) Hochfilzen | 17 December | ● | | |
| (Italy) Antholz-Anterselva | 21–24 January | ● | ● | ● |
| (West Germany) Ruhpolding | 28–31 January | ● | ● | ● |
| (Canada) Calgary | 20–26 February | ● | ● | ● |
| (France) Chamonix | 29 February–6 March | ● | ● | ● |
| (Norway) Holmenkollen | 10–13 March | ● | ● | ● |
| (Finland) Keuruu and Jyväskylä | 15–20 March | ● | ●● | ● |
| Total (each) | | 6 | 6 | 5 |

- 1988 Winter Olympics and 1988 World Championship races were not included in the 1987–88 World Cup scoring system.
  - The men competed at the 1988 Winter Olympics whilst the women competed at the 1988 World Championships.
- The relays were technically unofficial races as they did not count towards anything in the World Cup.

== World Cup Podium ==
=== Men ===
| Stage | Date | Place | Discipline | Winner | Second | Third | Yellow bib (After competition) | Det. |
|---|---|---|---|---|---|---|---|---|
| 1 | 17 December 1987 | (Austria) Hochfilzen | 20 km Individual | (West Germany) Fritz Fischer | (Soviet Union) Alexandr Popov | (Italy) Johann Passler | (West Germany) Fritz Fischer | |
| 1 | 19 December 1987 | (Austria) Hochfilzen | 10 km Sprint | Cancelled, held later on in Keuruu | | | (West Germany) Fritz Fischer | N/A |
| 2 | 21 January 1988 | (Italy) Antholz-Anterselva | 10 km Sprint | (East Germany) Frank-Peter Roetsch | (Norway) Eirik Kvalfoss | (Italy) Andreas Zingerle | (Italy) Johann Passler | |
| 2 | 23 January 1988 | (Italy) Antholz-Anterselva | 20 km Individual | (Italy) Johann Passler | (West Germany) Fritz Fischer | (France) Hervé Flandin | (Italy) Johann Passler | |
| 3 | 28 January 1988 | (West Germany) Ruhpolding | 20 km Individual | (West Germany) Ernst Reiter | (Italy) Andreas Zingerle | (Czechoslovakia) Jan Matouš | (West Germany) Fritz Fischer | |
| 3 | 30 January 1988 | (West Germany) Ruhpolding | 10 km Sprint | (West Germany) Stefan Höck | (Italy) Johann Passler | (West Germany) Peter Angerer | (Italy) Johann Passler | |
| 4 | 11 March 1988 | (Norway) Oslo Holmenkollen | 20 km Individual | (Norway) Gisle Fenne | (Soviet Union) Sergei Antonov | (Italy) Andreas Zingerle | (West Germany) Fritz Fischer | |
| 4 | 12 March 1988 | (Norway) Oslo Holmenkollen | 10 km Sprint | (East Germany) Frank-Peter Roetsch | (West Germany) Peter Angerer | (Norway) Geir Einang | (West Germany) Fritz Fischer | |
| 5 | 15 March 1988 | (Finland) Keuruu | 10 km Sprint | (Norway) Eirik Kvalfoss | (Soviet Union) Vladimir Drachev | (West Germany) Fritz Fischer | (West Germany) Fritz Fischer | |
| 6 | 18 March 1988 | (Finland) Jyväskylä | 20 km Individual | (Norway) Eirik Kvalfoss | (Soviet Union) Sergei Antonov | (Austria) Alfred Eder | (West Germany) Fritz Fischer | |
| 6 | 19 March 1988 | (Finland) Jyväskylä | 10 km Sprint | (Austria) Franz Schuler | (Norway) Eirik Kvalfoss | (Austria) Alfred Eder | (West Germany) Fritz Fischer | |

=== Women ===
| Stage | Date | Place | Discipline | Winner | Second | Third | Yellow bib (After competition) | Det. |
|---|---|---|---|---|---|---|---|---|
| 1 | 17 December 1987 | (Austria) Hochfilzen | 10 km Individual | (Norway) Anne Elvebakk | (Sweden) Eva Korpela | (Norway) Siri Grundnes | (Norway) Anne Elvebakk | Detail |
| 1 | 19 December 1987 | (Austria) Hochfilzen | 5 km Sprint | (Norway) Synnøve Thoresen | (Bulgaria) Nadezhda Aleksieva | (Finland) Tuija Vuoksiala | (Norway) Anne Elvebakk | Detail |
| 2 | 21 January 1988 | (Italy) Antholz-Anterselva | 5 km Sprint | (Norway) Elin Kristiansen | (Bulgaria) Nadezhda Aleksieva | (France) Marie-Pierre Baby | (Norway) Anne Elvebakk | Detail |
| 2 | 23 January 1988 | (Italy) Antholz-Anterselva | 10 km Individual | (Bulgaria) Iva Shkodreva | (Norway) Anne Elvebakk | (West Germany) Martina Stede | (Norway) Anne Elvebakk | Detail |
| 3 | 28 January 1988 | (West Germany) Ruhpolding | 10 km Individual | (Bulgaria) Iva Shkodreva | (West Germany) Petra Schaaf | (West Germany) Inga Kesper | (Norway) Anne Elvebakk | Detail |
| 3 | 30 January 1988 | (West Germany) Ruhpolding | 5 km Sprint | (Bulgaria) Tsvetana Krasteva | (West Germany) Petra Schaaf | (Bulgaria) Mariya Manolova | (Norway) Anne Elvebakk | Detail |
| 4 | 11 March 1988 | (Norway) Oslo Holmenkollen | 10 km Individual | (Norway) Elin Kristiansen | (Bulgaria) Nadezhda Aleksieva | (Norway) Helga Øvsthus | (Norway) Anne Elvebakk | Detail |
| 4 | 13 March 1988 | (Norway) Oslo Holmenkollen | 5 km Sprint | (Norway) Mona Bollerud | (Norway) Anne Elvebakk | (Norway) Elin Kristiansen | (Norway) Anne Elvebakk | Detail |
| 5 | 18 March 1988 | (Finland) Jyväskylä | 10 km Individual | (Bulgaria) Mariya Manolova | (Norway) Anne Elvebakk | (Norway) Elin Kristiansen | (Norway) Anne Elvebakk | Detail |
| 5 | 20 March 1988 | (Finland) Jyväskylä | 5 km Sprint | (Norway) Helga Øvsthus | (Bulgaria) Tsvetana Krasteva | (Bulgaria) Mariya Manolova | (Norway) Anne Elvebakk | Detail |

== Standings: Men ==
=== Overall ===
| Pos. | | Points |
|---|---|---|
| 1. | (West Germany) Fritz Fischer | 171 |
| 2. | (Norway) Eirik Kvalfoss | 167 |
| 3. | (Italy) Johann Passler | 160 |
| 4. | (West Germany) Peter Angerer | 151 |
| 5. | (Italy) Andreas Zingerle | 148 |

- Final standings after 10 races.

== Standings: Women ==
=== Overall ===
| Pos. | | Points |
|---|---|---|
| 1. | (Norway) Anne Elvebakk | 202 |
| 2. | (Norway) Elin Kristiansen | 188 |
| 3. | (Bulgaria) Nadezhda Aleksieva | 178 |
| 4. | (West Germany) Petra Schaaf | 174 |
| 5. | (Bulgaria) Iva Shkodreva | 170 |

- Final standings after 10 races.

== Achievements ==
First World Cup career victory

- Johann Passler (ITA), 26, in his 7th season — the WC 2 Individual in Antholz-Anterselva; first podium was 1982–83 Individual in Holmenkollen
- Ernst Reiter (FRG), 25, in his 5th season — the WC 3 Individual in Ruhpolding; first podium was 1986–87 Individual in Ruhpolding
- Stefan Höck (FRG), 24, in his 4th season — the WC 3 Sprint in Ruhpolding; it also was his first podium
- Gisle Fenne (NOR), 24, in his 5th season — the WC 4 Individual in Holmenkollen; first podium was 1985–86 Sprint in Antholz-Anterselva
- Franz Schuler (AUT), 25, in his 6th season — the WC 5 Sprint (2) in Jyväskylä; first podium was 1986–87 Sprint in Obertauern

First World Cup podium

- Hervé Flandin (FRA), 22, in his 3rd season — no. 3 in the WC 2 Individual in Antholz-Anterselva
- Geir Einang (NOR), 23, in his 4th season — no. 3 in the WC 4 Sprint in Holmenkollen
- Vladimir Drachev (URS), 22, in his 1st season — no. 2 in the WC 5 Sprint (1) in Jyväskylä

Victory in this World Cup (all-time number of victories in parentheses)

- Frank-Peter Roetsch (GDR), 2 (9) first places
- Eirik Kvalfoss (NOR), 2 (9) first places
- Fritz Fischer (FRG), 1 (5) first place
- Johann Passler (ITA), 1 (1) first place
- Ernst Reiter (FRG), 1 (1) first place
- Stefan Höck (FRG), 1 (1) first place
- Gisle Fenne (NOR), 1 (1) first place
- Franz Schuler (AUT), 1 (1) first place

== Retirements ==
The following notable biathletes retired after the 1987–88 season:

- Tapio Piipponen (FIN)
- Peter Angerer (FRG)
- Matthias Jacob (GDR)
- František Chládek (TCH)
- Dmitry Vasilyev (URS)
- Sergei Antonov (URS)
- Eva Korpela (SWE)
- Kaija Parve (URS)
- Venera Chernyshova (URS)

== Notes ==
1. ^{1} The Aftenposten source placed Løberg 17th with 70 points.
