= 1989–90 Biathlon World Cup =

Biathlon competition

1989–90 World Cup
Discipline	Men	Women
Overall	(Soviet Union) Sergei Tchepikov	(Czechoslovakia) Jiřina Adamičková
Nations Cup	Soviet Union	Soviet Union
Individual	(Soviet Union) Sergei Tchepikov	(Soviet Union) Elena Golovina
Sprint	(Soviet Union) Juri Kashkarov	(Czechoslovakia) Jiřina Adamičková

Competition

The 1989–90 Biathlon World Cup was a multi-race tournament over a season of biathlon, organised by the UIPMB (Union Internationale de Pentathlon Moderne et Biathlon). The season started on 14 December 1989 in Obertilliach, Austria, and ended on 18 March 1990 in Kontiolahti, Finland. It was the 13th season of the Biathlon World Cup.

Originally, the World Championships were to be held in Minsk. However, due to a lack of snow, only the individual competitions could be held, and the team, sprint and relay races were moved to Holmenkollen. This caused the UIPMB to declare the World Championship races as counting towards the World Cup. On the last day in Holmenkollen, the men's relay was cancelled during the last leg due to fog; it was subsequently moved to Kontiolahti.

== Calendar ==
Below is the World Cup calendar for the 1989–90 season.

Location	Date	Individual	Sprint	Team event	Relay
(Austria) Obertilliach	14–17 December	●	●	●	
(Italy) Antholz-Anterselva	18–21 January	●	●		●
(West Germany) Ruhpolding	25–28 January	●	●		●
(Austria) Walchsee	7–12 February	●	●		●
(Soviet Union) Minsk	2–5 March	●			
(Norway) Holmenkollen	8–11 March		●	●	
(Finland) Kontiolahti	15–18 March	●	●		●
Total		6	6	2	4

- 1991 World Championship races were not included in the 1990–91 World Cup scoring system.
- The relays were technically unofficial races as they did not count towards anything in the World Cup.

== World Cup Podium ==
=== Men ===
Stage	Date	Place	Discipline	Winner	Second	Third	Yellow bib (After competition)	Det.
1	14 December 1989	(Austria) Obertilliach	20 km Individual	(East Germany) André Sehmisch	(Soviet Union) Valeriy Medvedtsev	(Soviet Union) Sergei Bulygin	(East Germany) André Sehmisch	
1	16 December 1989	(Austria) Obertilliach	10 km Sprint	(East Germany) Birk Anders	(Soviet Union) Sergei Tarasov	(Norway) Eirik Kvalfoss	(Soviet Union) Valeriy Medvedtsev	
2	19 January 1990	(Italy) Antholz-Anterselva	10 km Sprint	(Soviet Union) Juri Kashkarov	(Soviet Union) Sergei Tchepikov	(Norway) Eirik Kvalfoss	(Norway) Eirik Kvalfoss	
2	20 January 1990	(Italy) Antholz-Anterselva	20 km Individual	(Sweden) Anders Mannelqvist	(Italy) Andreas Zingerle	(Norway) Eirik Kvalfoss	(Norway) Eirik Kvalfoss	
3	25 January 1990	(West Germany) Ruhpolding	10 km Sprint	(Soviet Union) Juri Kashkarov	(East Germany) Birk Anders	(Soviet Union) Valeriy Medvedtsev	(Norway) Eirik Kvalfoss	
3	27 January 1990	(West Germany) Ruhpolding	20 km Individual	(Soviet Union) Sergei Tchepikov	(East Germany) Frank Luck	(France) Thierry Gerbier	(Norway) Eirik Kvalfoss	
4	1 February 1990	(Austria) Walchsee	20 km Individual	(East Germany) Birk Anders	(Norway) Frode Løberg	(Norway) Eirik Kvalfoss	(Norway) Eirik Kvalfoss	
4	3 February 1990	(Austria) Walchsee	10 km Sprint	(Soviet Union) Juri Kashkarov	(East Germany) Frank Luck	(East Germany) Mark Kirchner	(Norway) Eirik Kvalfoss	
WC	20 February 1990	(Soviet Union) Minsk	20 km Individual	(Soviet Union) Valeriy Medvedtsev	(Soviet Union) Sergei Tchepikov	(Soviet Union) Anatoly Zhdanovich	(Norway) Eirik Kvalfoss	
WC	22 February 1990	(Soviet Union) Minsk	10 km Sprint	Cancelled, held later on in Oslo Holmenkollen			(Norway) Eirik Kvalfoss	N/A
5	6 March 1990	(Norway) Oslo Holmenkollen	20 km Individual	Cancelled, held earlier on in Minsk			(Norway) Eirik Kvalfoss	N/A
WC	10 March 1990	(Norway) Oslo Holmenkollen	10 km Sprint	(East Germany) Mark Kirchner	(Norway) Eirik Kvalfoss	(Soviet Union) Sergei Tchepikov	(Norway) Eirik Kvalfoss	
6	15 March 1990	(Finland) Kontiolahti	20 km Individual	(Norway) Eirik Kvalfoss	(Soviet Union) Sergei Tchepikov	(East Germany) André Sehmisch	(Norway) Eirik Kvalfoss	
6	17 March 1990	(Finland) Kontiolahti	10 km Sprint	(Italy) Andreas Zingerle	(Austria) Franz Schuler	(East Germany) André Sehmisch	(Soviet Union) Sergei Tchepikov	

=== Women ===
Stage	Date	Place	Discipline	Winner	Second	Third	Yellow bib (After competition)	Det.
1	14 December 1989	(Austria) Obertilliach	15 km Individual	(Soviet Union) Elena Golovina	(Soviet Union) Elena Batsevitch	(Soviet Union) Luiza Tcherepanova	(Soviet Union) Elena Golovina	Detail
1	16 December 1989	(Austria) Obertilliach	7.5 km Sprint	(Czechoslovakia) Jiřina Adamičková	(Soviet Union) Svetlana Davidova	(Soviet Union) Svetlana Panyutina	(Czechoslovakia) Jiřina Adamičková	Detail
2	19 January 1990	(Italy) Antholz-Anterselva	7.5 km Sprint	(Czechoslovakia) Jiřina Adamičková	(Soviet Union) Svetlana Panyutina	(Finland) Seija Hyytiäinen	(Czechoslovakia) Jiřina Adamičková	Detail
2	20 January 1990	(Italy) Antholz-Anterselva	15 km Individual	(Bulgaria) Tsvetana Krasteva	(Norway) Anne Elvebakk	(Sweden) Inger Björkbom	(Czechoslovakia) Jiřina Adamičková	Detail
3	25 January 1990	(West Germany) Ruhpolding	15 km Individual	(Soviet Union) Elena Golovina	(Soviet Union) Svetlana Davidova	(Soviet Union) Svetlana Paramygina	(Czechoslovakia) Jiřina Adamičková	Detail
3	27 January 1990	(West Germany) Ruhpolding	7.5 km Sprint	(Czechoslovakia) Jiřina Adamičková	(Norway) Anne Elvebakk	(Bulgaria) Mariya Manolova	(Czechoslovakia) Jiřina Adamičková	Detail
4	1 February 1990	(Austria) Walchsee	15 km Individual	(Bulgaria) Iva Shkodreva	(Canada) Myriam Bédard	(West Germany) Inga Kesper	(Czechoslovakia) Jiřina Adamičková	Detail
4	3 February 1990	(Austria) Walchsee	7.5 km Sprint	(Czechoslovakia) Jiřina Adamičková	(United States) Anna Sonnerup	(West Germany) Dorina Pieper	(Czechoslovakia) Jiřina Adamičková	Detail
5	6 March 1990	(Norway) Oslo Holmenkollen	15 km Individual	(Soviet Union) Svetlana Davidova	(Soviet Union) Elena Golovina	(West Germany) Petra Schaaf	(Czechoslovakia) Jiřina Adamičková	Detail
5	10 March 1990	(Norway) Oslo Holmenkollen	7.5 km Sprint	(Norway) Anne Elvebakk	(Soviet Union) Svetlana Davidova	(Norway) Elin Kristiansen	(Czechoslovakia) Jiřina Adamičková	Detail
6	15 March 1990	(Finland) Kontiolahti	15 km Individual	(Czechoslovakia) Jiřina Adamičková	(Soviet Union) Elena Belova	(West Germany) Dorina Pieper	(Czechoslovakia) Jiřina Adamičková	Detail
6	17 March 1990	(Finland) Kontiolahti	7.5 km Sprint	(Norway) Anne Elvebakk	(Bulgaria) Tsvetana Krasteva	(Soviet Union) Elena Belova	(Czechoslovakia) Jiřina Adamičková	Detail

=== Men's team ===
Event	Date	Place	Discipline	Winner	Second	Third
1	17 December 1989	(Austria) Obertilliach	4x7.5 km Relay	East Germany Frank Luck; André Sehmisch; Mark Kirchner; Birk Anders	Soviet Union Sergei Bulygin; Sergei Tarasov; Valeriy Medvedtsev; Sergei Tchepikov	Italy Pieralberto Carrara; Wilfried Pallhuber; Johann Passler; Andreas Zingerle
2	21 January 1990	(Italy) Antholz	4x7.5 km Relay	France Gilles Marguet; Thierry Gerbier; Christian Dumont; Hervé Flandin	Norway Geir Einang; Dag Bjørndalen; Gisle Fenne; Eirik Kvalfoss	Soviet Union Anatoly Zhdanovich; Juri Kashkarov; Valeriy Medvedtsev; Sergei Tchepikov
3	28 January 1990	(Germany) Ruhpolding	4x7.5 km Relay	Soviet Union Valeriy Noskov; Juri Kashkarov; Valeriy Medvedtsev; Sergei Tchepikov	Norway Geir Einang; Frode Løberg; Gisle Fenne; Eirik Kvalfoss	East Germany Frank Luck; André Sehmisch; Raik Dittrich; Birk Anders
4	4 February 1990	(Austria) Walchsee	4x7.5 km Relay	East Germany Frank Luck; André Sehmisch; Mark Kirchner; Birk Anders	Soviet Union Valeriy Noskov; Sergei Loshkin; Gennady Karpinkin; Sergei Bulygin	Czechoslovakia Tomáš Kos; Jiří Holubec; Petr Garabík; Jan Matouš
WC	8 March 1990	(Norway) Oslo Holmenkollen	Team event	East Germany Raik Dittrich; Mark Kirchner; Birk Anders; Frank Luck	Czechoslovakia Tomáš Kos; Ivan Masařík; Jiří Holubec; Jan Matouš	France Christian Dumont; Stéphane Bouthiaux; Hervé Flandin; Thierry Gerbier
WC	18 March 1990	(Finland) Kontiolahti	4x7.5 km Relay	Italy Pieralberto Carrara; Wilfried Pallhuber; Johann Passler; Andreas Zingerle	France Christian Dumont; Xavier Blond; Hervé Flandin; Thierry Gerbier	East Germany Frank Luck; André Sehmisch; Mark Kirchner; Birk Anders

=== Women's team ===
Event	Date	Place	Discipline	Winner	Second	Third
1	17 December 1989	(Austria) Obertilliach	3x6 km Relay	Soviet Union Elena Batsevich; Svetlana Davidova; Elena Golovina	Bulgaria Cvetana Krasteva; Mariya Manolova; Iva Shkodreva	West Germany Dorina Pieper; Inga Kesper; Petra Schaaf
2	21 January 1990	(Italy) Antholz	3x6 km Relay	Finland Tuija Vuoksiala; Pirjo Mattila; Seija Hyytiäinen	Norway Synnøve Thoresen; Åse Idland; Anne Elvebakk	Bulgaria Cvetana Krasteva; Mariya Manolova; Iva Shkodreva
3	28 January 1990	(Germany) Ruhpolding	3x6 km Relay	Soviet Union Svetlana Panyutina; Elena Golovina; Svetlana Davidova	Bulgaria Cvetana Krasteva; Iva Shkodreva; Mariya Manolova	Finland Tuija Vuoksiala; Pirjo Mattila; Seija Hyytiäinen
4	4 February 1990	(Austria) Walchsee	3x6 km Relay	Soviet Union Svetlana Davidova; Elena Golovina; Svetlana Paramygina	West Germany Inga Kesper; Dorina Pieper; Petra Schaaf	Bulgaria Mariya Manolova; Iva Shkodreva; Nadezhda Aleksieva
5	18 March 1990	(Norway) Oslo	3x6 km Relay	Soviet Union Elena Batsevich; Elena Golovina; Svetlana Davidova	Norway Grete Ingeborg Nykkelmo; Anne Elvebakk; Elin Kristiansen	Finland Tuija Vuoksiala; Seija Hyytiäinen; Pirjo Mattila

== Standings: Men ==
=== Overall ===
Pos.		Points
1.	(Soviet Union) Sergei Tchepikov	196
2.	(Norway) Eirik Kvalfoss	192
3.	(Soviet Union) Valeriy Medvedtsev	161
4.	(East Germany) Frank Luck	160
5.	(Italy) Andreas Zingerle	159

- Final standings after 12 races.

=== Individual ===
Pos.		Points
1.	(Soviet Union) Sergei Tchepikov	103
2.	(Norway) Eirik Kvalfoss	98
3.	(East Germany) André Sehmisch	89
4.	(Italy) Andreas Zingerle	87
5.	(Soviet Union) Valeriy Medvedtsev	85

- Final standings after 6 races.

=== Sprint ===
Pos.		Points
1.	(Soviet Union) Juri Kashkarov	105
2.	(East Germany) Birk Anders	94
3.	(Norway) Eirik Kvalfoss	94
4.	(Soviet Union) Sergei Tchepikov	93
5.	(East Germany) Frank Luck	80

- Final standings after 6 races.

=== Nation ===
Pos.		Points
1.	Soviet Union	5591
2.	East Germany	5577
3.	Italy	5498
4.	Norway	5333
5.	France	5278

- Final standings after 16 races.

== Standings: Women ==
=== Overall ===
Pos.		Points
1.	(Czechoslovakia) Jiřina Adamičková	213
2.	(Norway) Anne Elvebakk	183
3.	(Soviet Union) Elena Golovina	181
4.	(Bulgaria) Cvetana Krasteva	159
5.	(Soviet Union) Svetlana Davidova	154

- Final standings after 12 races.

=== Individual ===
Pos.		Points
1.	(Soviet Union) Elena Golovina	103
2.	(Czechoslovakia) Jiřina Adamičková	93
3.	(Soviet Union) Elena Batsevich	86
4.	(Bulgaria) Cvetana Krasteva	81
5.	(Norway) Anne Elvebakk	80

- Final standings after 6 races.

=== Sprint ===
Pos.		Points
1.	(Czechoslovakia) Jiřina Adamičková	120
2.	(Norway) Anne Elvebakk	103
3.	(Soviet Union) Svetlana Davidova	84
4.	(Soviet Union) Svetlana Panyutina	84
5.	(Soviet Union) Elena Golovina	78

- Final standings after 6 races.

=== Nation ===
Pos.		Points
1.	Soviet Union	5476
2.	Finland	5465
3.	West Germany	5244
4.	Bulgaria	5221
5.	Norway	5201

- Final standings after 16 races.

== Medal table ==
Rank	Nation	Gold	Silver	Bronze	Total
1	Soviet Union	13	14	9	36
2	East Germany	6	3	5	14
3	Czechoslovakia	5	0	1	6
4	Norway	3	8	5	16
5	Bulgaria	2	3	3	8
6	Italy	2	1	1	4
7	France	1	1	1	3
8	Finland	1	0	3	4
9	Sweden	1	0	1	2
10	West Germany	0	1	5	6
11	Austria	0	1	0	1
11	Canada	0	1	0	1
11	United States	0	1	0	1
Totals (13 entries)		34	34	34	102

== Achievements ==
=== Men ===
First World Cup career victory

- Anders Mannelqvist (SWE), 25, in his 5th season — the WC 2 Individual in Antholz-Anterselva; it also was his first podium
- Mark Kirchner (GDR), 19, in his 1st season — the World Championships Sprint in Holmenkollen; first podium was the 1989–90 Sprint in Walchsee
- Andreas Zingerle (ITA), 28, in his 9th season — the WC 5 Sprint in Kontiolahti; first podium was the 1985–86 Individual in Lahti

First World Cup podium

- Sergei Tarasov (URS), 24, in his 1st season — no. 2 in the WC 1 Sprint in Obertilliach
- Frode Løberg (NOR), 27, in his 4th season — no. 2 in the WC 4 Individual in Walchsee
- Mark Kirchner (GDR), 19, in his 1st season — no. 3 in the WC 4 Sprint in Walchsee

Victory in this World Cup (all-time number of victories in parentheses)

- Juri Kashkarov (URS), 3 (6) first places
- Birk Anders (GDR), 2 (4) first places
- Eirik Kvalfoss (NOR), 1 (11) first place
- Valeriy Medvedtsev (URS), 1 (4) first place
- André Sehmisch (GDR), 1 (2) first place
- Sergei Tchepikov (URS), 1 (2) first place
- Anders Mannelqvist (SWE), 1 (1) first place
- Mark Kirchner (GDR), 1 (1) first place
- Andreas Zingerle (ITA), 1 (1) first place

=== Women ===
Victory in this World Cup (all-time number of victories in parentheses)

- Jiřina Adamičková (TCH), 5 (5) first places
- Elena Golovina (URS), 2 (5) first places
- Anne Elvebakk (NOR), 2 (3) first places
- Iva Shkodreva (BUL), 1 (2) first place
- Svetlana Davidova (URS), 1 (2) first place
- Cvetana Krasteva (BUL), 1 (1) first place

== Retirements ==
Following notable biathletes retired after the 1989–90 season:

- Vladimir Velichkov (BUL)
- Birk Anders (GDR)
- Cvetana Krasteva (BUL)
- Helga Øvsthus (NOR)
