= 1986–87 Biathlon World Cup =

Biathlon competition

1986–87 World Cup
Discipline	Men	Women
Overall	(East Germany) Frank-Peter Roetsch	
Nations Cup	East Germany	

Competition

The 1986–87 Biathlon World Cup was a multi-race tournament over a season of biathlon, organised by the UIPMB (Union Internationale de Pentathlon Moderne et Biathlon). The season started on 18 December 1986 in Obertauern, Austria, and ended on 15 March 1987 in Lillehammer, Norway. It was the tenth season of the Biathlon World Cup. The first round of the World Cup was originally going to be held in Hochfilzen, Austria, but the races were moved to Obertauern due to a lack of snow.

== Calendar ==
Below is the World Cup calendar for the 1986–87 season.

Location	Date	Individual	Sprint	Relay
(Austria) Obertauern	18–21 December	●	●	●
(People's Republic of Bulgaria) Borovets	8–11 January	●	●	●
(Italy) Antholz-Anterselva	15–18 January	●	●	●
(West Germany) Ruhpolding	22–25 January	●	●	●
(United States) Lake Placid	12–15 February	●	●	●
(Canada) Canmore	19–22 February	●	●	●
(Norway) Lillehammer	12–15 March	●	●	●
Total		7	7	7

- 1987 World Championship races were not included in the 1986–87 World Cup scoring system.
- The relays were technically unofficial races as they did not count towards anything in the World Cup.

== World Cup Podium ==
=== Men ===
Stage	Date	Place	Discipline	Winner	Second	Third	Yellow bib (After competition)	Det.
1	17 December 1986	(Austria) Hochfilzen	20 km Individual	(Soviet Union) Valeriy Medvedtsev	(Czechoslovakia) František Chládek	(Soviet Union) Alexandr Popov	(Soviet Union) Valeriy Medvedtsev	
1	20 December 1986	(Austria) Hochfilzen	10 km Sprint	(Sweden) Roger Westling	(East Germany) Frank-Peter Roetsch	(Austria) Franz Schuler	(Soviet Union) Valeriy Medvedtsev	
2	8 January 1987	(Bulgaria) Borovets	20 km Individual	(Czechoslovakia) Jan Matouš	(West Germany) Fritz Fischer	(Soviet Union) Valeriy Medvedtsev	(Soviet Union) Valeriy Medvedtsev	
2	10 January 1987	(Bulgaria) Borovets	10 km Sprint	(West Germany) Fritz Fischer	(Soviet Union) Dmitry Vasilyev	(Soviet Union) Valeriy Medvedtsev	(Soviet Union) Valeriy Medvedtsev	
3	15 January 1987	(Italy) Antholz-Anterselva	20 km Individual	(East Germany) Frank-Peter Roetsch	(Soviet Union) Alexandr Popov	(Soviet Union) Anatoly Zhdanovich	(West Germany) Fritz Fischer	
3	17 January 1987	(Italy) Antholz-Anterselva	10 km Sprint	(Soviet Union) Alexandr Popov	(East Germany) Frank-Peter Roetsch	(Soviet Union) Dmitry Vasilyev	(West Germany) Fritz Fischer	
4	22 January 1987	(West Germany) Ruhpolding	20 km Individual	(Soviet Union) Andrei Zenkov	(West Germany) Fritz Fischer	(West Germany) Ernst Reiter	(West Germany) Fritz Fischer	
4	24 January 1987	(West Germany) Ruhpolding	10 km Sprint	(West Germany) Fritz Fischer	(Czechoslovakia) Jan Matouš	(Norway) Eirik Kvalfoss	(West Germany) Fritz Fischer	
5	19 February 1987	(Canada) Canmore	20 km Individual	(Soviet Union) Valeriy Medvedtsev	(East Germany) Matthias Jacob	(East Germany) André Sehmisch	(West Germany) Fritz Fischer	
5	21 February 1987	(Canada) Canmore	10 km Sprint	(Soviet Union) Alexandr Popov (Soviet Union) Juri Kashkarov		(West Germany) Peter Angerer	(East Germany) Frank-Peter Roetsch	
6	12 March 1987	(Norway) Lillehammer	20 km Individual	(East Germany) Matthias Jacob	(East Germany) Frank-Peter Roetsch	(East Germany) André Sehmisch	(East Germany) Frank-Peter Roetsch	
6	14 March 1987	(Norway) Lillehammer	10 km Sprint	(West Germany) Peter Angerer	(East Germany) André Sehmisch	(East Germany) Frank-Peter Roetsch	(East Germany) Frank-Peter Roetsch	

== Standings: Men ==
=== Overall ===
Pos.		Points
1.	(East Germany) Frank-Peter Roetsch	188
2.	(West Germany) Fritz Fischer	183
3.	(Czechoslovakia) Jan Matouš	166
4.	(Soviet Union) Valeriy Medvedtsev	163
5.	(Soviet Union) Alexandr Popov	154

- Final standings after 12 races.

== Achievements ==
First World Cup career victory

- Roger Westling (SWE), 25, in his 5th season — the WC 1 Sprint in Obertauern; it also was his first podium
- Jan Matouš (TCH), 25, in his 5th season — the WC 2 Individual in Borovets; first podium was 1985–86 Individual in Lahti
- Alexandr Popov (URS), 21, in his 2nd season — the WC 3 Sprint in Antholz-Anterselva; first podium was 1986–87 Individual in Obertauern

First World Cup podium

- František Chládek (TCH), 28, — no. 2 in the WC 1 Individual in Obertauern
- Alexandr Popov (URS), 21, in his 2nd season — no. 3 in the WC 1 Individual in Obertauern
- Franz Schuler (AUT), 24, in his 5th season — no. 3 in the WC 1 Sprint in Obertauern
- Ernst Reiter (FRG), 24, in his 4th season — no. 3 in the WC 4 Individual in Ruhpolding

Victory in this World Cup (all-time number of victories in parentheses)

- Fritz Fischer (FRG), 2 (4) first places
- Valeriy Medvedtsev (URS), 2 (3) first places
- Peter Angerer (FRG), 1 (10) first place
- Frank-Peter Roetsch (GDR), 1 (7) first place
- Matthias Jacob (GDR), 1 (5) first place
- Juri Kashkarov (URS), 1 (3) first place
- Andrei Zenkov (URS), 1 (2) first place
- Roger Westling (SWE), 1 (1) first place
- Jan Matouš (TCH), 1 (1) first place
- Alexandr Popov (URS), 1 (1) first place

== Retirements ==
Following notable biathletes retired after the 1986–87 season:

- Andrei Zenkov (URS)
- Aino Kallunki (FIN)
- Sanna Gronlid (NOR)
- Siv Bråten (NOR)

== Notes ==
1. ^{1} The Wintersport source places Finland 3rd, but after the fifth round of the World Cup, they were at ninth. And so it seems more logical that the Soviet Union placed 3rd as they were at second place before the last World Cup at Lillehammer in which the Soviets did not participate.
