= 1985–86 Biathlon World Cup =

Biathlon competition

1985–86 World Cup
Discipline	Men	Women
Overall	(East Germany) André Sehmisch	
Nations Cup	East Germany	

Competition

The 1985–86 Biathlon World Cup was a multi-race tournament over a season of biathlon, organised by the UIPMB (Union Internationale de Pentathlon Moderne et Biathlon). The season started on 16 January 1986 in Antholz-Anterselva, Italy, and ended on 16 March 1986 in Boden, Sweden. It was the ninth season of the Biathlon World Cup.

== Calendar ==
Below is the World Cup calendar for the 1985–86 season.

Location	Date	Individual	Sprint	Relay
(Italy) Antholz-Anterselva	16–19 January	●	●	●
(Austria) Feistritz	23–26 January	●	●	●
(East Germany) Oberhof	30 January–2 February	●	●	●
(Norway) Holmenkollen	20–23 February	●	●	●
(Finland) Lahti	7–9 March	●	●	●
(Sweden) Boden	14–16 March	●	●	●
Total		6	6	6

- 1986 World Championship races were not included in the 1985–86 World Cup scoring system.

*The relays were technically unofficial races as they did not count towards anything in the World Cup.

== World Cup Podium ==
=== Men ===
Stage	Date	Place	Discipline	Winner	Second	Third	Yellow bib (After competition)	Det.
1	16 January 1986	(Italy) Antholz-Anterselva	20 km Individual	(Soviet Union) Valeriy Medvedtsev	(Italy) Gottlieb Taschler	(Soviet Union) Sergei Antonov	(Soviet Union) Valeriy Medvedtsev	
1	18 January 1986	(Italy) Antholz-Anterselva	10 km Sprint	(West Germany) Peter Angerer	(Soviet Union) Andrei Nepein	(Norway) Gisle Fenne	(West Germany) Peter Angerer	
2	23 January 1986	(Austria) Feistritz	20 km Individual	(Soviet Union) Sergei Antonov	(Soviet Union) Dmitry Vasilyev	(East Germany) André Sehmisch	(West Germany) Peter Angerer	
2	25 January 1986	(Austria) Feistritz	10 km Sprint	(Soviet Union) Andrei Nepein	(East Germany) André Sehmisch	(East Germany) Frank-Peter Roetsch	(West Germany) Peter Angerer	
3	30 January 1986	(East Germany) Oberhof	20 km Individual	(West Germany) Peter Angerer	(East Germany) André Sehmisch	(Soviet Union) Anatoly Zhdanovich	(West Germany) Peter Angerer	
3	1 February 1986	(East Germany) Oberhof	10 km Sprint	(East Germany) Matthias Jacob	(East Germany) André Sehmisch	(East Germany) Frank-Peter Roetsch	(West Germany) Peter Angerer	
4	8 March 1986	(Finland) Lahti	20 km Individual	(West Germany) Peter Angerer	(Czechoslovakia) Jan Matouš	(Italy) Andreas Zingerle	(West Germany) Peter Angerer	
4	9 March 1986	(Finland) Lahti	10 km Sprint	(East Germany) André Sehmisch	(West Germany) Fritz Fischer	(Italy) Johann Passler	(East Germany) André Sehmisch	
5	14 March 1986	(Sweden) Boden	20 km Individual	(Finland) Tapio Piipponen	(East Germany) André Sehmisch	(Austria) Alfred Eder	(East Germany) André Sehmisch	
5	15 March 1986	(Sweden) Boden	10 km Sprint	(East Germany) Matthias Jacob	(Soviet Union) Sergei Antonov	(Norway) Eirik Kvalfoss	(East Germany) André Sehmisch	

== Standings: Men ==
=== Overall ===
Pos.		Points
1.	(East Germany) André Sehmisch	158
2.	(West Germany) Peter Angerer	146
3.	(East Germany) Matthias Jacob	124
4.	(Finland) Tapio Piipponen	123
5.	(Austria) Alfred Eder	120

- Final standings after 10 races.

== Achievements ==
First World Cup career victory

- Valeriy Medvedtsev (URS), 21, in his 1st season — the WC 1 Individual in Antholz-Anterselva; it also was his first podium
- Andrei Nepein (URS), in his 3rd season — the WC 2 Sprint in Feistritz; first podium was 1985–86 Sprint in Antholz-Anterselva
- André Sehmisch (GDR), 21, in his 3rd season — the WC 4 Sprint in Lahti; first podium was 1984–85 Sprint in Lahti
- Tapio Piipponen (FIN), 28, in his 7th season — the WC 5 Individual in Boden; first podium was 1981–82 Sprint in Ruhpolding

First World Cup podium

- Gottlieb Taschler (ITA), 24, in his 5th season — no. 2 in the WC 1 Individual in Antholz-Anterselva
- Andrei Nepein (URS), in his 3rd season — no. 2 in the WC 1 Sprint in Antholz-Anterselva
- Gisle Fenne (NOR), 22, in his 3rd season — no. 3 in the WC 1 Sprint in Antholz-Anterselva
- Anatoly Zhdanovich (URS), 23, in his 1st season — no. 3 in the WC 3 Individual in Oberhof
- Jan Matouš (TCH), 24, in his 3rd season — no. 2 in the WC 4 Individual in Lahti
- Andreas Zingerle (ITA), 24, in his 5th season — no. 3 in the WC 4 Individual in Lahti
- André Sehmisch (GDR), 20, in his 2nd season — no. 3 in the WC 4 Sprint in Lahti

Victory in this World Cup (all-time number of victories in parentheses)

- Peter Angerer (FRG), 3 (9) first places
- Matthias Jacob (GDR), 2 (4) first places
- Sergei Antonov (URS), 1 (2) first place
- Valeriy Medvedtsev (URS), 1 (1) first place
- Andrei Nepein (URS), 1 (1) first place
- André Sehmisch (GDR), 1 (1) first place
- Tapio Piipponen (FIN), 1 (1) first place

== Retirements ==
Following notable biathletes retired after the 1985–86 season:

- Mette Mestad (NOR)
