= Biathlon World Cup =

International biathlon skiing competition during northern winter

IBU World Cup Biathlon
- Status: Active
- Genre: Sporting event
- Date: Northern wintertime season
- Begins: November
- Ends: March
- Frequency: Annual
- Country: Varying
- Inaugurated: January 1978
- Next event: 2026–27 Biathlon World Cup
- Area: Europe, North America
- Organiser: International Biathlon Union
- Sponsor: BMW

The Biathlon World Cup is a top-level biathlon season-long competition series. It has been held since the winter seasons of 1977–78 for men and 1982–83 for women. The women's seasons until 1986–87 season were called the European Cup, although participation was not restricted to Europeans.

== Competition and format ==
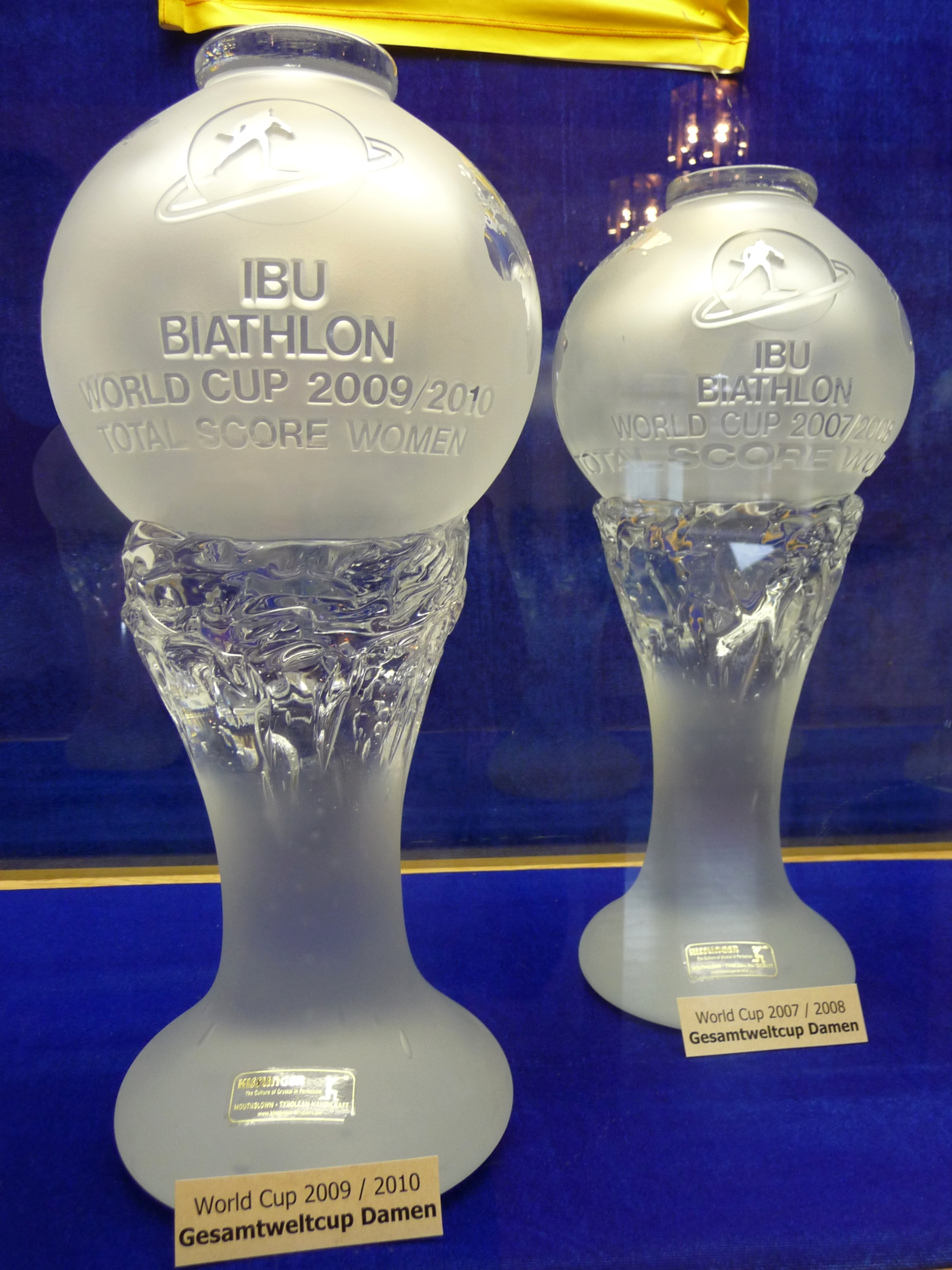
Overall Crystal Globes for the 2009/2010 and 2007/2008 seasons.

The World Cup season lasts from November or December to late March, with meetings in a different venue every week excluding some holidays and a couple of weeks before the season's major championships (World Championships or Winter Olympics). All in all, the season comprises nine to ten meetings, with events taking place from Wednesday–Thursday through Sunday. Relay competitions are held four to six times per season. Formerly counted as World Cup events were World Championships (the last Championship to count towards the World Cup were held in Pokljuka, Slovenia 2021) and Winter Olympics events (the last Olympics to count towards the World Cup were the 2010 Winter Olympics: from the 2014 Winter Olympics competitors are no longer awarded World Cup points for their Olympic performances).

The athlete with the highest overall total score (i.e. total score for all disciplines) of the World Cup season is awarded the Big Crystal Globe trophy. A Small Crystal Globe trophy is awarded for the first place in the season total for each discipline. Hence, it is possible for an athlete to win both the Big Crystal Globe and Small Crystal Globes for the same World Cup season.

The tables given below provide an overview of the highest-ranking biathletes and nations of each WC season. For sprint/individual/pursuit/mass start first place gives 90 points, 2nd place – 75 pts, 3rd place – 65 pts, 4th place – 55 pts, 5th place – 50 pts, 6th place – 45 pts, 7th – 41 pts, 8th – 37 points, 9th – 34 points, 10th – 31 points, then linearly decreasing by one point down to the 40th place. In Equal placings (ties) give an equal number of points. The mass start from 22nd to 30th has different way of points giving. The sum of all WC points of the season, less the points from an IBU-predetermined number of events (e.g. 2), gives the biathlete's total WC score.

From 1985 to 2000, WC points were awarded so that the first four places gave 30, 26, 24, and 22 points, respectively, and then the 5th to 25th place gave 21, 20, ..., down to 1 point. Before this, points were simply awarded linearly from 25 to 1.

As of February 2024, meetings have primarily been held in Europe and North America; the only other places to have hosted meetings that weren't the World Championships or the Winter Olympics, are Nagano, Japan in 1996–97, and Pyeongchang, South Korea in 2007–08 and 2016–17.

== Overall winners ==
=== Individual total men ===
- Romanization of Cyrillic script-based names follows the IBU's athlete records.
- See the List of IOC country codes for expansions of country abbreviations.

Season	Winner	Runner-up	Third place
1977–78	(East Germany) Frank Ullrich	(East Germany) Klaus Siebert	(East Germany) Eberhard Rösch
1978–79	(East Germany) Klaus Siebert	(East Germany) Frank Ullrich	(Soviet Union) Vladimir Barnashov
1979–80	(East Germany) Frank Ullrich	(East Germany) Klaus Siebert (2)	(East Germany) Eberhard Rösch (2)
1980–81	(East Germany) Frank Ullrich	(Soviet Union) Anatoly Alyabyev	(Norway) Kjell Søbak
1981–82	(East Germany) Frank Ullrich (4)	(East Germany) Matthias Jacob	(Norway) Kjell Søbak (2)
1982–83	(West Germany) Peter Angerer	(Norway) Eirik Kvalfoss	(East Germany) Frank Ullrich
1983–84	(East Germany) Frank-Peter Roetsch	(West Germany) Peter Angerer	(Norway) Eirik Kvalfoss
1984–85	(East Germany) Frank-Peter Roetsch	(Soviet Union) Juri Kashkarov	(West Germany) Peter Angerer
1985–86	(East Germany) André Sehmisch	(West Germany) Peter Angerer (2)	(East Germany) Matthias Jacob
1986–87	(East Germany) Frank-Peter Roetsch (3)	(West Germany) Fritz Fischer	(Czechoslovakia) Jan Matouš
1987–88	(West Germany) Fritz Fischer	(Norway) Eirik Kvalfoss	(Italy) Johann Passler
1988–89	(Norway) Eirik Kvalfoss	(Soviet Union) Alexandr Popov	(Soviet Union) Sergei Tchepikov
1989–90	(Soviet Union) Sergei Tchepikov	(Norway) Eirik Kvalfoss (3)	(Soviet Union) Valeriy Medvedtsev
1990–91	(Soviet Union) Sergei Tchepikov (2)	(Germany) Mark Kirchner	(Italy) Andreas Zingerle
1991–92	(Norway) Jon Åge Tyldum	(Sweden) Mikael Löfgren	(Norway) Sylfest Glimsdal
1992–93	(Sweden) Mikael Löfgren	(Germany) Mark Kirchner (2)	(Italy) Pieralberto Carrara
1993–94	(France) Patrice Bailly-Salins	(Germany) Sven Fischer	(Germany) Frank Luck
1994–95	(Norway) Jon Åge Tyldum (2)	(Italy) Patrick Favre	(Italy) Wilfried Pallhuber
1995–96	(Russia) Vladimir Drachev^{1}	(Russia) Viktor Maigourov	(Germany) Sven Fischer
1996–97	(Germany) Sven Fischer	(Norway) Ole Einar Bjørndalen	(Russia) Viktor Maigourov
1997–98	(Norway) Ole Einar Bjørndalen	(Germany) Ricco Groß	(Germany) Sven Fischer
1998–99	(Germany) Sven Fischer (2)	(Norway) Ole Einar Bjørndalen	(Germany) Frank Luck
1999–00	(France) Raphaël Poirée	(Norway) Ole Einar Bjørndalen	(Germany) Sven Fischer
2000–01	(France) Raphaël Poirée	(Norway) Ole Einar Bjørndalen	(Norway) Frode Andresen
2001–02	(France) Raphaël Poirée	(Russia) Pavel Rostovtsev	(Norway) Ole Einar Bjørndalen
2002–03	(Norway) Ole Einar Bjørndalen	(Belarus) Vladimir Drachev^{1}	(Germany) Ricco Groß
2003–04	(France) Raphaël Poirée (4)	(Norway) Ole Einar Bjørndalen	(Germany) Ricco Groß
2004–05	(Norway) Ole Einar Bjørndalen	(Germany) Sven Fischer (2)	(France) Raphaël Poirée
2005–06	(Norway) Ole Einar Bjørndalen	(France) Raphaël Poirée	(Germany) Sven Fischer (4)
2006–07	(Germany) Michael Greis	(Norway) Ole Einar Bjørndalen (6)	(France) Raphaël Poirée (2)
2007–08	(Norway) Ole Einar Bjørndalen	(Russia) Dmitri Yaroshenko	(Norway) Emil Hegle Svendsen
2008–09	(Norway) Ole Einar Bjørndalen (6)	(Poland) Tomasz Sikora	(Norway) Emil Hegle Svendsen (2)
2009–10	(Norway) Emil Hegle Svendsen	(Austria) Christoph Sumann	(Russia) Ivan Tcherezov
2010–11	(Norway) Tarjei Bø	(Norway) Emil Hegle Svendsen	(France) Martin Fourcade
2011–12	(France) Martin Fourcade	(Norway) Emil Hegle Svendsen	(Germany) Andreas Birnbacher
2012–13	(France) Martin Fourcade	(Norway) Emil Hegle Svendsen	(Austria) Dominik Landertinger
2013–14	(France) Martin Fourcade	(Norway) Emil Hegle Svendsen (4)	(Norway) Johannes Thingnes Bø
2014–15	(France) Martin Fourcade	(Russia) Anton Shipulin	(Slovenia) Jakov Fak
2015–16	(France) Martin Fourcade	(Norway) Johannes Thingnes Bø	(Russia) Anton Shipulin
2016–17	(France) Martin Fourcade	(Russia) Anton Shipulin (2)	(Norway) Johannes Thingnes Bø (2)
2017–18	(France) Martin Fourcade (7)	(Norway) Johannes Thingnes Bø	(Russia) Anton Shipulin (2)
2018–19	(Norway) Johannes Thingnes Bø	(Russia) Alexandr Loginov	(France) Quentin Fillon Maillet
2019–20	(Norway) Johannes Thingnes Bø	(France) Martin Fourcade	(France) Quentin Fillon Maillet
2020–21	(Norway) Johannes Thingnes Bø	(Norway) Sturla Holm Lægreid	(France) Quentin Fillon Maillet (3)
2021–22	(France) Quentin Fillon Maillet	(Norway) Sturla Holm Lægreid	(Sweden) Sebastian Samuelsson
2022–23	(Norway) Johannes Thingnes Bø	(Norway) Sturla Holm Lægreid	(Norway) Vetle Sjåstad Christiansen
2023–24	(Norway) Johannes Thingnes Bø (5)	(Norway) Tarjei Bø	(Norway) Johannes Dale-Skjevdal
2024–25	(Norway) Sturla Holm Lægreid	(Norway) Johannes Thingnes Bø (3)	(France) Éric Perrot
2025–26	(France) Éric Perrot	(Norway) Sturla Holm Lægreid (4)	(Norway) Johan-Olav Botn

Statistics by athlete

Rank	Nation	Gold	Silver	Bronze	Total
1	(France) Martin Fourcade	7	1	1	9
2	(Norway) Ole Einar Bjørndalen	6	6	1	13
3	(Norway) Johannes Thingnes Bø	5	3	2	10
4	(France) Raphaël Poirée	4	1	2	7
5	(East Germany) Frank Ullrich	4	1	1	6
6	(East Germany) Frank-Peter Roetsch	3	0	0	3
7	(Germany) Sven Fischer	2	2	4	8
8	(Soviet Union) Sergei Tchepikov	2	0	1	3
9	(Norway) Jon Åge Tyldum	2	0	0	2
10	(Norway) Emil Hegle Svendsen	1	4	2	7
11	(Norway) Sturla Holm Laegreid	1	4	0	5
12	(Norway) Eirik Kvalfoss	1	3	1	5
13	(West Germany) Peter Angerer	1	2	1	4
14	(East Germany) Klaus Siebert	1	2	0	3
15	(West Germany) Fritz Fischer	1	1	0	2
15	(Sweden) Mikael Löfgren	1	1	0	2
15	(Norway) Tarjei Bø	1	1	0	2
15	(Russia) (Belarus) Vladimir Drachev	1	1	0	2
19	(France) Quentin Fillon Maillet	1	0	3	4
20	(France) Éric Perrot	1	0	1	2
21	(East Germany) André Sehmisch	1	0	0	1
21	(Germany) Michael Greis	1	0	0	1
21	(France) Patrice Bailly-Salins	1	0	0	1

Statistics by country

Rank	Nation	Gold	Silver	Bronze	Total
1	Norway	17	21	13	51
2	France	14	2	7	23
3	East Germany	9	4	4	17
4	Germany	3	5	9	17
5	Soviet Union	2	3	3	8
6	West Germany	2	3	1	6
7	Russia	1	6	4	11
8	Sweden	1	1	1	3
9	Italy	0	1	4	5
10	Austria	0	1	1	2
11	Belarus	0	1	0	1
11	Poland	0	1	0	1
13	Czechoslovakia	0	0	1	1
13	Slovenia	0	0	1	1
Totals (14 entries)		49	49	49	147

=== Individual total women ===
- Romanization of Cyrillic script-based names follows the IBU's athlete records.
- See the List of IOC country codes for expansions of country abbreviations.

The women's World Cup seasons until 1986–87 were actually called the European Cup, although participation was open to biathletes of all nationalities. Until 1987–88, women raced on shorter tracks than they do today. The 1988–89 season was the first in which women raced on tracks of the same length that they do nowadays.

Season	Winner	Runner-up	Third place
1982–83	(Norway) Gry Østvik	(Norway) Siv Bråten	(Finland) Aino Kallunki
1983–84	(Norway) Mette Mestad	(Norway) Sanna Grønlid	(Norway) Gry Østvik
1984–85	(Norway) Sanna Grønlid	(Sweden) Eva Korpela	(Soviet Union) Kaija Parve
1985–86	(Sweden) Eva Korpela	(Norway) Sanna Grønlid (2)	(Canada) Lise Meloche
1986–87	(Sweden) Eva Korpela (2)	(Norway) Anne Elvebakk	(Norway) Sanna Grønlid
1987–88	(Norway) Anne Elvebakk	(Norway) Elin Kristiansen	(Bulgaria) Nadezhda Aleksieva
1988–89	(Soviet Union) Elena Golovina	(Soviet Union) Natalia Prikazchikova	(Soviet Union) Svetlana Davidova
1989–90	(Czechoslovakia) Jiřina Adamičková	(Norway) Anne Elvebakk (2)	(Soviet Union) Elena Golovina
1990–91	(Soviet Union) Svetlana Davidova	(Canada) Myriam Bédard	(Norway) Anne Elvebakk
1991–92	(Commonwealth of Independent States) Anfisa Reztsova	(France) Anne Briand	(Germany) Petra Schaaf^{1}
1992–93	(Russia) Anfisa Reztsova (2)	(Canada) Myriam Bédard (2)	(France) Anne Briand
1993–94	(Belarus) Svetlana Paramygina	(Italy) Nathalie Santer	(France) Anne Briand (2)
1994–95	(France) Anne Briand	(Belarus) Svetlana Paramygina	(Germany) Uschi Disl
1995–96	(France) Emmanuelle Claret	(Germany) Uschi Disl	(Germany) Petra Behle^{1} (2)
1996–97	(Sweden) Magdalena Forsberg	(Germany) Uschi Disl	(Germany) Simone Greiner
1997–98	(Sweden) Magdalena Forsberg	(Germany) Uschi Disl (3)	(Germany) Martina Zellner
1998–99	(Sweden) Magdalena Forsberg	(Ukraine) Olena Zubrilova	(Germany) Uschi Disl
1999–00	(Sweden) Magdalena Forsberg	(Ukraine) Olena Zubrilova (2)	(France) Corinne Niogret
2000–01	(Sweden) Magdalena Forsberg	(Norway) Liv Grete Poirée	(Ukraine) Olena Zubrilova
2001–02	(Sweden) Magdalena Forsberg (6)	(Norway) Liv Grete Poirée (2)	(Germany) Uschi Disl (3)
2002–03	(Germany) Martina Glagow	(Russia) Albina Akhatova	(France) Sylvie Becaert
2003–04	(Norway) Liv Grete Poirée	(Russia) Olga Pyleva	(France) Sandrine Bailly
2004–05	(France) Sandrine Bailly	(Germany) Kati Wilhelm	(Russia) Olga Pyleva
2005–06	(Germany) Kati Wilhelm	(Sweden) Anna Carin Olofsson	(Germany) Martina Glagow
2006–07	(Germany) Andrea Henkel	(Germany) Kati Wilhelm	(Sweden) Anna Carin Olofsson
2007–08	(Germany) Magdalena Neuner	(France) Sandrine Bailly	(Germany) Andrea Henkel
2008–09	(Sweden) Helena Jonsson^{2}	(Germany) Kati Wilhelm (3)	(Norway) Tora Berger
2009–10	(Germany) Magdalena Neuner	(Germany) Simone Hauswald	(Sweden) Helena Jonsson^{2}
2010–11	(Finland) Kaisa Mäkäräinen	(Germany) Andrea Henkel	(Sweden) Helena Ekholm^{2} (2)
2011–12	(Germany) Magdalena Neuner (3)	(Belarus) Darya Domracheva	(Norway) Tora Berger (2)
2012–13	(Norway) Tora Berger	(Belarus) Darya Domracheva (2)	(Germany) Andrea Henkel (2)
2013–14	(Finland) Kaisa Mäkäräinen	—	(Belarus) Darya Domracheva
2013–14	(Norway) Tora Berger (2)^{3}	—	(Belarus) Darya Domracheva
2014–15	(Belarus) Darya Domracheva	(Finland) Kaisa Mäkäräinen	(Ukraine) Valentyna Semerenko
2015–16	(Czech Republic) Gabriela Soukalová^{4}	(France) Marie Dorin Habert	(Italy) Dorothea Wierer
2016–17	(Germany) Laura Dahlmeier	(Czech Republic) Gabriela Koukalová^{4}	(Finland) Kaisa Mäkäräinen
2017–18	(Finland) Kaisa Mäkäräinen (3)	(Slovakia) Anastasiya Kuzmina	(Belarus) Darya Domracheva (2)
2018–19	(Italy) Dorothea Wierer	(Italy) Lisa Vittozzi	(Slovakia) Anastasiya Kuzmina
2019–20	(Italy) Dorothea Wierer (2)	(Norway) Tiril Eckhoff	(Germany) Denise Herrmann
2020–21	(Norway) Tiril Eckhoff	(Norway) Marte Olsbu Røiseland	(Germany) Franziska Preuß
2021–22	(Norway) Marte Olsbu Røiseland	(Sweden) Elvira Öberg	(Austria) Lisa Theresa Hauser
2022–23	(France) Julia Simon	(Italy) Dorothea Wierer	(Italy) Lisa Vittozzi
2023–24	(Italy) Lisa Vittozzi	(France) Lou Jeanmonnot	(Norway) Ingrid Landmark Tandrevold
2024–25	(Germany) Franziska Preuß	(France) Lou Jeanmonnot (2)	(France) Julia Simon
2025–26	(France) Lou Jeanmonnot	(Sweden) Hanna Öberg	(Italy) Lisa Vittozzi (2)

Notes

- ^{1} Petra Schaaf married XC skier and later German national XC ski team coach Jochen Behle.
- ^{2} Helena Jonsson married fellow biathlete David Ekholm in 2010.
- ^{3} Kaisa Mäkäräinen was the winner at the conclusion of the season with Tora Berger 2nd. However, the results of Olga Zaitseva were later annulled due to doping offences. The recalculation would have given overall world cup win to Berger, but the IBU made the decision based on the principle that clean athletes cannot be punished for the doping offenses of others.
- ^{4} Gabriela Soukalová took the name Koukalová when she married professional badminton player Petr Koukal in 2016. They divorced in 2020.

Statistics by athlete

Rank	Nation	Gold	Silver	Bronze	Total
1	Magdalena Forsberg (SWE)	6	0	0	6
2	Kaisa Mäkäräinen (FIN)	3	1	1	5
3	Magdalena Neuner (GER)	3	0	0	3
4	Dorothea Wierer (ITA)	2	1	1	4
5	Eva Korpela (SWE)	2	1	0	3
6	Tora Berger (NOR)	2	0	2	4
7	Anfisa Reztsova (RUS)	2	0	0	2
8	Kati Wilhelm (GER)	1	3	0	4
9	Darya Domracheva (BLR)	1	2	2	5
10	Anne Elvebakk (NOR)	1	2	1	4
10	Sanna Grønlid (NOR)	1	2	1	4
12	Liv Grete Skjelbreid Poirée (NOR)	1	2	0	3
12	Lou Jeanmonnot (FRA)	1	2	0	3
14	Andrea Henkel (GER)	1	1	2	4
14	Anne Briand (FRA)	1	1	2	4
14	Lisa Vittozzi (ITA)	1	1	2	4
17	Sandrine Bailly (FRA)	1	1	1	3
18	Gabriela Koukalová (CZE)	1	1	0	2
18	Marte Olsbu Røiseland (NOR)	1	1	0	2
18	Svetlana Paramygina (BLR)	1	1	0	2
18	Tiril Eckhoff (NOR)	1	1	0	2
22	Helena Ekholm (SWE)	1	0	2	3
23	Franziska Preuß (GER)	1	0	1	2
23	Gry Østvik (NOR)	1	0	1	2
23	Julia Simon (FRA)	1	0	1	2
23	Martina Glagow (GER)	1	0	1	2
23	Svetlana Davidova (URS)	1	0	1	2
23	Yelena Golovina (URS)	1	0	1	2
29	Emmanuelle Claret (FRA)	1	0	0	1
29	Jiřina Adamičková (TCH)	1	0	0	1
29	Laura Dahlmeier (GER)	1	0	0	1
29	Mette Mestad (NOR)	1	0	0	1

Statistics by country

Rank	Nation	Gold	Silver	Bronze	Total
1	Norway	9	10	6	25
2	Sweden	9	4	3	16
3	Germany	8	8	12	28
4	France	5	5	6	16
5	Italy	3	3	3	9
6	Finland	3	1	2	6
7	Belarus	2	3	2	7
8	Soviet Union	2	1	3	6
9	Russia	1	2	1	4
10	Czech Republic	1	1	0	2
11	CIS	1	0	0	1
11	Czechoslovakia	1	0	0	1
13	Ukraine	0	2	2	4
14	Canada	0	2	1	3
15	Slovakia	0	1	1	2
16	Austria	0	0	1	1
16	Bulgaria	0	0	1	1
Totals (17 entries)		45	43	44	132

=== Individual total U25 / U23 ===
The U25 and U23 classifications were introduced in the Biathlon World Cup to recognize the best young biathletes under the age of 25 and under the age of 23, respectively. The titles are awarded based on the total points accumulated in all individual competitions throughout the season. The U25 category was contested from the 2020–21 season until 2023–24, while the U23 category replaced it starting from the 2024–25 season. Below are the podium finishers for both men and women since the inception of the classifications, as well as medal tables by country.

==== Men's U25 / U23 ====
Season	Winner	Runner-up	Third place
U25
2020–21	(Norway) Sturla Holm Lægreid	(Norway) Johannes Dale	(Sweden) Sebastian Samuelsson
2021–22	(Norway) Sturla Holm Lægreid (2)	(Sweden) Sebastian Samuelsson	(Norway) Sivert Guttorm Bakken
2022–23	(Switzerland) Niklas Hartweg	(Italy) Tommaso Giacomel	(Switzerland) Sebastian Stalder
2023–24	(Italy) Tommaso Giacomel	(France) Éric Perrot	(Italy) Didier Bionaz
U23
2024–25	(United States) Campbell Wright	(Ukraine) Vitalii Mandzyn	(Norway) Isak Frey
2025–26	(Norway) Isak Leknes Frey	(Ukraine) Vitalii Mandzyn (2)	(Poland) Konrad Badacz

Statistics by country

Rank	Nation	Gold	Silver	Bronze	Total
1	Norway	3	1	2	6
2	Italy	1	1	1	3
3	Switzerland	1	0	1	2
4	United States	1	0	0	1
5	Ukraine	0	2	0	2
6	Sweden	0	1	1	2
7	France	0	1	0	1
8	Poland	0	0	1	1
Totals (8 entries)		6	6	6	18

==== Women's U25 / U23 ====
Season	Winner	Runner-up	Third place
U25
2020–21	(Belarus) Dzinara Alimbekava	(Norway) Ingrid Landmark Tandrevold	(Czech Republic) Markéta Davidová
2021–22	(Sweden) Elvira Öberg	(Czech Republic) Markéta Davidová	(Germany) Vanessa Voigt
2022–23	(Sweden) Elvira Öberg	(France) Lou Jeanmonnot	(France) Sophie Chauveau
2023–24	(Sweden) Elvira Öberg (3)	(Norway) Juni Arnekleiv	(Czech Republic) Tereza Voborníková
U23
2024–25	(France) Océane Michelon	(France) Jeanne Richard	(Germany) Selina Grotian
2025–26	(Norway) Maren Kirkeeide	(Germany) Julia Tannheimer	(Germany) Selina Grotian (2)

Statistics by country

Rank	Nation	Gold	Silver	Bronze	Total
1	Sweden	3	0	0	3
2	France	1	2	1	4
3	Norway	1	2	0	3
4	Belarus	1	0	0	1
5	Germany	0	1	3	4
6	Czech Republic	0	1	2	3
Totals (6 entries)		6	6	6	18

== Individual discipline titles ==
=== Men's titles ===
Season	Individual	Sprint	Pursuit	Mass Start
1988–89	(Soviet Union) Alexandr Popov	(Norway) Eirik Kvalfoss	no competition	no competition
1989–90	(Soviet Union) Sergei Tchepikov	(Soviet Union) Juri Kashkarov	no competition	no competition
1990–91	(Germany) Mark Kirchner	(Soviet Union) Sergei Tchepikov	no competition	no competition
1991–92	(Norway) Jon Åge Tyldum	(Norway) Sylfest Glimsdal	no competition	no competition
1992–93	(Sweden) Mikael Löfgren	(Germany) Sven Fischer	no competition	no competition
1993–94	(France) Patrice Bailly-Salins	(Germany) Sven Fischer	no competition	no competition
1994–95	(Italy) Patrick Favre	(Norway) Ole Einar Bjørndalen	no competition	no competition
1995–96	(Russia) Vladimir Drachev	(Russia) Vladimir Drachev	no competition	no competition
1996–97	(Germany) Ricco Groß	(Norway) Ole Einar Bjørndalen	(Russia) Viktor Maigourov	no competition
1997–98	(Norway) Halvard Hanevold	(Norway) Ole Einar Bjørndalen	(Germany) Sven Fischer	no competition
1998–99	(Russia) Pavel Rostovtsev	(Germany) Sven Fischer	(France) Raphaël Poirée	(Germany) Sven Fischer
1999–00	(Germany) Frank Luck	(Norway) Ole Einar Bjørndalen	(Norway) Ole Einar Bjørndalen	(France) Raphaël Poirée
2000–01	(Russia) Sergei Rozhkov	(Norway) Ole Einar Bjørndalen	(France) Raphaël Poirée	(Germany) Sven Fischer (2)
2001–02	(Germany) Frank Luck (2)	(Germany) Sven Fischer (4)	(France) Raphaël Poirée	(Russia) Viktor Maigourov
2002–03	(Norway) Halvard Hanevold (2)	(Norway) Ole Einar Bjørndalen	(Norway) Ole Einar Bjørndalen	(Norway) Ole Einar Bjørndalen
2003–04	(France) Raphaël Poirée	(France) Raphaël Poirée	(France) Raphaël Poirée (4)	(France) Raphaël Poirée
2004–05	(Germany) Michael Greis	(Norway) Ole Einar Bjørndalen	(Germany) Sven Fischer (2)	(France) Raphaël Poirée (3)
2004–05	(Norway) Ole Einar Bjørndalen	(Norway) Ole Einar Bjørndalen	(Germany) Sven Fischer (2)	(Norway) Ole Einar Bjørndalen
2005–06	(Germany) Michael Greis	(Poland) Tomasz Sikora	(Norway) Ole Einar Bjørndalen	(Norway) Ole Einar Bjørndalen
2006–07	(France) Raphaël Poirée (2)	(Germany) Michael Greis	(Russia) Dmitry Yaroshenko	(Norway) Ole Einar Bjørndalen
2007–08	(France) Vincent Defrasne	(Norway) Ole Einar Bjørndalen	(Norway) Ole Einar Bjørndalen	(Norway) Ole Einar Bjørndalen (5)
2008–09	(Germany) Michael Greis (3)	(Norway) Ole Einar Bjørndalen (9)	(Norway) Ole Einar Bjørndalen (5)	(Austria) Dominik Landertinger
2009–10	(Austria) Christoph Sumann	(Norway) Emil Hegle Svendsen	(France) Martin Fourcade	(Austria) Christoph Sumann
2010–11	(Norway) Emil Hegle Svendsen	(Norway) Tarjei Bø	(Norway) Tarjei Bø	(Norway) Emil Hegle Svendsen
2011–12	(France) Simon Fourcade	(France) Martin Fourcade	(France) Martin Fourcade	(Germany) Andreas Birnbacher
2012–13	(France) Martin Fourcade	(France) Martin Fourcade	(France) Martin Fourcade	(France) Martin Fourcade
2013–14	(Norway) Emil Hegle Svendsen	(France) Martin Fourcade	(France) Martin Fourcade	(France) Martin Fourcade
2014–15	(Ukraine) Serhiy Semenov	(France) Martin Fourcade	(France) Martin Fourcade	(Russia) Anton Shipulin
2015–16	(France) Martin Fourcade	(France) Martin Fourcade	(France) Martin Fourcade	(France) Martin Fourcade
2016–17	(France) Martin Fourcade	(France) Martin Fourcade	(France) Martin Fourcade	(France) Martin Fourcade
2017–18	(France) Martin Fourcade	(France) Martin Fourcade	(France) Martin Fourcade (8)	(France) Martin Fourcade (5)
2017–18	(Norway) Johannes Thingnes Bø	(France) Martin Fourcade	(France) Martin Fourcade (8)	(France) Martin Fourcade (5)
2018–19	(Norway) Johannes Thingnes Bø	(Norway) Johannes Thingnes Bø	(Norway) Johannes Thingnes Bø	(Norway) Johannes Thingnes Bø
2019–20	(France) Martin Fourcade (5)	(France) Martin Fourcade (8)	(France) Émilien Jacquelin	(Norway) Johannes Thingnes Bø
2020–21	(Norway) Sturla Holm Lægreid	(Norway) Johannes Thingnes Bø	(Norway) Sturla Holm Lægreid	(Norway) Tarjei Bø
2021–22	(Norway) Tarjei Bø	(France) Quentin Fillon Maillet	(France) Quentin Fillon Maillet	(Norway) Sivert Guttorm Bakken
2022–23	(Norway) Vetle Sjåstad Christiansen	(Norway) Johannes Thingnes Bø	(Norway) Johannes Thingnes Bø	(Norway) Vetle Sjåstad Christiansen
2023–24	(Norway) Johannes Thingnes Bø (3)	(Norway) Tarjei Bø (2)	(Norway) Johannes Thingnes Bø (3)	(Norway) Johannes Thingnes Bø (3)
2024–25	(Norway) Sturla Holm Lægreid (2)	(Norway) Johannes Thingnes Bø (4)	(Norway) Sturla Holm Lægreid (2)	(Norway) Sturla Holm Lægreid
2025–26	(France) Éric Perrot	(Norway) Sturla Holm Lægreid	(France) Éric Perrot	(France) Éric Perrot

Statistics by athlete

Total		Individual	Sprint	Pursuit	Mass Start
26	(France) Martin Fourcade	5	8	8	5
20	(Norway) Ole Einar Bjørndalen	1	9	5	5
13	(Norway) Johannes Thingnes Bø	3	4	3	3
10	(France) Raphaël Poirée	2	1	4	3
8	(Germany) Sven Fischer		4	2	2
6	(Norway) Sturla Holm Lægreid	2	1	2	1
5	(Norway) Tarjei Bø	1	2	1	1
4	(Germany) Michael Greis	3	1		
4	(Norway) Emil Hegle Svendsen	2	1		1
3	(France) Éric Perrot	1		1	1
2	(Germany) Frank Luck	2			
2	(Norway) Halvard Hanevold	2			
2	(Soviet Union) Sergei Tchepikov	1	1		
2	(Russia) Vladimir Drachev	1	1		
2	(Norway) Vetle Sjåstad Christiansen	1			1
2	(France) Quentin Fillon Maillet		1	1	
2	(Russia) Viktor Maigourov			1	1
2	(Austria) Christoph Sumann	1			1

Statistics by country

Total		Individual	Sprint	Pursuit	Mass Start
56	Norway	13	19	11	13
45	France	11	10	15	9
17	Germany	7	5	2	3
8	Russia	3	1	2	2
4	Soviet Union	2	2		
3	Austria	1			2
1	Italy	1			
1	Sweden	1			
1	Ukraine	1			
1	Poland		1		

=== Women's titles ===
Season	Individual	Sprint	Pursuit	Mass Start
1988–89	(Soviet Union) Elena Golovina	(Soviet Union) Elena Golovina	no competition	no competition
1989–90	(Soviet Union) Elena Golovina (2)	(Czechoslovakia) Jiřina Adamičková	no competition	no competition
1990–91	(Soviet Union) Svetlana Davidova	(Germany) Uschi Disl	no competition	no competition
1991–92	(Commonwealth of Independent States) Anfisa Reztsova	(Commonwealth of Independent States) Anfisa Reztsova	no competition	no competition
1992–93	(Russia) Anfisa Reztsova (2)	(Russia) Anfisa Reztsova (2)	no competition	no competition
1993–94	(Italy) Nathalie Santer	(Belarus) Svetlana Paramygina	no competition	no competition
1994–95	(Belarus) Svetlana Paramygina	(France) Anne Briand	no competition	no competition
1995–96	(Slovenia) Andreja Grašič	(France) Emmanuelle Claret	no competition	no competition
1996–97	(Germany) Uschi Disl	(Germany) Uschi Disl (2)	(Sweden) Magdalena Forsberg	no competition
1997–98	(Sweden) Magdalena Forsberg	(Sweden) Magdalena Forsberg	(Sweden) Magdalena Forsberg	no competition
1998–99	(Germany) Uschi Disl (2)	(Sweden) Magdalena Forsberg	(Ukraine) Olena Zubrilova	(Ukraine) Olena Zubrilova
1999–00	(Sweden) Magdalena Forsberg	(Sweden) Magdalena Forsberg	(Sweden) Magdalena Forsberg	(Russia) Galina Koukleva
2000–01	(Sweden) Magdalena Forsberg	(Sweden) Magdalena Forsberg	(Sweden) Magdalena Forsberg	(Sweden) Magdalena Forsberg
2001–02	(Sweden) Magdalena Forsberg (4)	(Sweden) Magdalena Forsberg (5)	(Sweden) Magdalena Forsberg (5)	(Sweden) Magdalena Forsberg (2)
2002–03	(Norway) Linda Tjørhom	(France) Sylvie Becaert	(Germany) Martina Glagow	(Russia) Albina Akhatova
2003–04	(Russia) Olga Pyleva	(Norway) Liv Grete Poirée	(Norway) Liv Grete Poirée	(Norway) Liv Grete Poirée
2004–05	(Russia) Olga Pyleva (2)	(Germany) Kati Wilhelm	(France) Sandrine Bailly	(Russia) Olga Zaitseva
2005–06	(Russia) Svetlana Ishmouratova	(Germany) Kati Wilhelm (2)	(Germany) Kati Wilhelm	(Germany) Martina Glagow
2006–07	(Germany) Andrea Henkel	(Sweden) Anna Carin Olofsson	(Germany) Kati Wilhelm	(Germany) Kati Wilhelm
2007–08	(Germany) Martina Glagow	(Germany) Magdalena Neuner	(France) Sandrine Bailly (2)	(Germany) Magdalena Neuner
2008–09	(Germany) Magdalena Neuner	(Sweden) Helena Jonsson	(Germany) Kati Wilhelm (3)	(Sweden) Helena Jonsson
2009–10	(Sweden) Anna Carin Zidek	(Germany) Simone Hauswald	(Germany) Magdalena Neuner	(Germany) Magdalena Neuner (2)
2010–11	(Sweden) Helena Ekholm	(Germany) Magdalena Neuner	(Finland) Kaisa Mäkäräinen	(Belarus) Darya Domracheva
2011–12	(Sweden) Helena Ekholm (2)	(Germany) Magdalena Neuner (3)	(Belarus) Darya Domracheva	(Belarus) Darya Domracheva
2012–13	(Norway) Tora Berger	(Norway) Tora Berger	(Norway) Tora Berger	(Norway) Tora Berger
2013–14	(Czech Republic) Gabriela Soukalová	(Finland) Kaisa Mäkäräinen	(Finland) Kaisa Mäkäräinen	(Belarus) Darya Domracheva (3)
2014–15	(Finland) Kaisa Mäkäräinen	(Belarus) Darya Domracheva	(Belarus) Darya Domracheva (2)	(Germany) Franziska Preuß
2014–15	(Finland) Kaisa Mäkäräinen	(Belarus) Darya Domracheva	(Finland) Kaisa Mäkäräinen (3)	(Germany) Franziska Preuß
2015–16	(Italy) Dorothea Wierer	(Czech Republic) Gabriela Soukalová	(Czech Republic) Gabriela Soukalová	(Czech Republic) Gabriela Soukalová
2016–17	(Germany) Laura Dahlmeier	(Czech Republic) Gabriela Koukalová (2)	(Germany) Laura Dahlmeier	(Czech Republic) Gabriela Koukalová (2)
2017–18	(Belarus) Nadezhda Skardino	(Slovakia) Anastasiya Kuzmina	(Slovakia) Anastasiya Kuzmina	(Finland) Kaisa Mäkäräinen
2018–19	(Italy) Lisa Vittozzi	(Slovakia) Anastasiya Kuzmina (2)	(Italy) Dorothea Wierer	(Sweden) Hanna Öberg
2019–20	(Sweden) Hanna Öberg	(Germany) Denise Herrmann	(Norway) Tiril Eckhoff	(Italy) Dorothea Wierer
2020–21	(Austria) Lisa Theresa Hauser	(Norway) Tiril Eckhoff	(Norway) Tiril Eckhoff (2)	(Norway) Ingrid Landmark Tandrevold
2020–21	(Italy) Dorothea Wierer (2)	(Norway) Tiril Eckhoff	(Norway) Tiril Eckhoff (2)	(Norway) Ingrid Landmark Tandrevold
2021–22	(Czech Republic) Markéta Davidová	(Norway) Marte Olsbu Røiseland	(Norway) Marte Olsbu Røiseland	(France) Justine Braisaz-Bouchet
2022–23	(Italy) Lisa Vittozzi	(Germany) Denise Herrmann-Wick (2)	(France) Julia Simon	(France) Julia Simon
2023–24	(Italy) Lisa Vittozzi (3)	(Norway) Ingrid Landmark Tandrevold	(Italy) Lisa Vittozzi	(France) Lou Jeanmonnot
2024–25	(France) Lou Jeanmonnot	(Germany) Franziska Preuß	(France) Lou Jeanmonnot	(Germany) Franziska Preuß (2)
2025–26	(France) Lou Jeanmonnot (2)	(France) Lou Jeanmonnot	(France) Lou Jeanmonnot (2)	(France) Julia Simon (2)

Statistics by athlete

Total		Individual	Sprint	Pursuit	Mass Start
16	(Sweden) Magdalena Forsberg	4	5	5	2
7	(Germany) Magdalena Neuner	1	3	1	2
6	(Czech Republic) Gabriela Soukalová	1	2	1	2
6	(Finland) Kaisa Mäkäräinen	1	1	3	1
6	(France) Lou Jeanmonnot	2	1	2	1
6	(Germany) Kati Wilhelm		2	3	1
6	(Belarus) Darya Domracheva		1	2	3
4	(Italy) Lisa Vittozzi	3		1	
4	(Russia) Anfisa Reztsova	2	2		
4	(Germany) Uschi Disl	2	2		
4	(Sweden) Helena Ekholm	2	1		1
4	(Italy) Dorothea Wierer	2		1	1
4	(Norway) Tora Berger	1	1	1	1
3	(Soviet Union) Elena Golovina	2	1		
3	(Germany) Martina Glagow	1		1	1
3	(Slovakia) Anastasiya Kuzmina		2	1	
3	(Norway) Tiril Eckhoff		1	2	
3	(Norway) Liv Grete Poirée		1	1	1
3	(Germany) Franziska Preuß		1		2
3	(France) Julia Simon			1	2
2	(Russia) Olga Pyleva	2			
2	(Belarus) Svetlana Paramygina	1	1		
2	(Germany) Laura Dahlmeier	1		1	
2	(Sweden) Hanna Öberg	1			1
2	(Germany) Denise Herrmann-Wick		2		
2	(Norway) Marte Olsbu Røiseland		1	1	
2	(Norway) Ingrid Landmark Tandrevold		1		1
2	(France) Sandrine Bailly			2	
2	(Ukraine) Olena Zubrilova			1	1

Statistics by country

Total		Individual	Sprint	Pursuit	Mass Start
29	Germany	6	11	6	6
24	Sweden	8	7	5	4
15	Norway	2	5	5	3
15	France	2	4	5	4
9	Italy	6		2	1
9	Belarus	2	2	2	3
8	Russia	4	1		3
7	Czech Republic	2	2	1	2
6	Finland	1	1	3	1
4	Soviet Union	3	1		
3	Slovakia		2	1	
2	CIS	1	1		
2	Ukraine			1	1
1	Austria	1			
1	Slovenia	1			
1	Czechoslovakia		1		

== Relay titles ==
=== Men's relay ===
Season	Winner	Runner-up	Third place
2000–01	Norway (189)	Germany (173)	Czech Republic (167)
2001–02	Norway (238)	Germany (230)	Belarus (202)
2002–03	Belarus (319)	Russia (318)	Norway (298)
2003–04	Norway (176)	Germany (174)	France (172)
2004–05	Norway (200)	Germany (181)	Russia (178)
2005–06	Germany (200)	Russia (184)	France (169)
2006–07	Russia (196)	Norway (189)	Germany (178)
2007–08	Norway (196)	Russia (192)	Germany (175)
2008–09	Austria (276)	Norway (254)	Germany (247)
2009–10	Norway (228)	Austria (210)	Russia (205)
2010–11	Norway (216)	Germany (199)	Ukraine (163)
2011–12	France (198)	Norway (190)	Russia (189)
2012–13	Russia (305)	Norway (302)	France (296)
2013–14	Germany (200)	Sweden (199)	Austria (197)
2014–15	Russia (311)	Norway (308)	Germany (305)
2015–16	Norway (282)	Russia (255)	Germany (236)
2016–17	Russia (259)	France (242)	Germany (237)
2017–18	Norway (228)	Sweden (184)	France (180)
2018–19	Norway (270)	Russia (236)	Germany (233)
2019–20	Norway (348)	France (302)	Germany (264)
2020–21	Norway (228)	Sweden (204)	France (203)
2021–22	Norway (276)	France (239)	Germany (231)
2022–23	Norway (450)	Germany (330)	France (320)
2023–24	Norway (450)	Germany (330)	Italy (290)
2024–25	France (450)	Norway (355)	Sweden (311)
2025–26	Norway (435)	France (390)	Sweden (315)

Statistics by country

Rank	Nation	Gold	Silver	Bronze	Total
1	Norway	16	6	1	23
2	Russia	4	5	3	12
3	Germany	2	7	9	18
4	France	2	4	6	12
5	Austria	1	1	1	3
6	Belarus	1	0	1	2
7	Sweden	0	3	2	5
8	Czech Republic	0	0	1	1
8	Italy	0	0	1	1
8	Ukraine	0	0	1	1
Totals (10 entries)		26	26	26	78

=== Women's relay ===
Season	Winner	Runner-up	Third place
2000–01	Norway (190)	Germany (188)	Russia (182)
2001–02	Germany (250)	Norway (221); Russia (221)	—
2002–03	Russia (339)	Germany (327)	Belarus (293)
2003–04	Norway (180)	Russia (178)	Germany (176)
2004–05	Russia (200)	Germany (188)	Norway (163)
2005–06	Russia (189)	Germany (181)	France (179)
2006–07	France (189)	Germany (188)	Russia (180)
2007–08	Germany (200)	Russia (178)	France (172)
2008–09	Germany (288)	France (242)	Ukraine (232)
2009–10	Russia (234)	Germany (205)	France (204)
2010–11	Germany (206)	Sweden (190)	Russia (177)
2011–12	France (216)	Norway (205)	Russia (192)
2012–13	Norway (314)	Ukraine (298)	Germany (294)
2013–14	Germany (174)	Ukraine (162)	Norway (142)
2014–15	Czech Republic (316)	Germany (302)	France (266)
2015–16	Germany (235)	Ukraine (234)	France (228)
2016–17	Germany (300)	France (248)	Ukraine (224)
2017–18	Germany (228)	France (200)	Italy (169)
2018–19	Norway (249)	Germany (241)	France (230)
2019–20	Norway (360)	Switzerland (260)	Germany (260)
2020–21	Sweden (216)	Germany (216)	France (204)
2021–22	Sweden (243)	Norway (235)	France (216)
2022–23	France (345)	Norway (325)	Sweden (321)
2023–24	Norway (376)	Sweden (345)	France (325)
2024–25	France (370)	Sweden (340)	Norway (335)
2025–26	France (355)	Sweden (350)	Norway (333)

Statistics by country

Rank	Nation	Gold	Silver	Bronze	Total
1	Germany	8	9	3	20
2	Norway	6	4	4	14
3	France	5	3	9	17
4	Russia	4	3	4	11
5	Sweden	2	4	1	7
6	Czech Republic	1	0	0	1
7	Ukraine	0	3	2	5
8	Switzerland	0	1	0	1
9	Belarus	0	0	1	1
9	Italy	0	0	1	1
Totals (10 entries)		26	27	25	78

=== Mixed relay ===
Season	Winner	Runner-up	Third place
2010–11	France (150)	Germany (148)	Sweden (143)
2011–12	Russia (143)	France (138)	Germany (128)
2012–13	Norway (114)	Russia (98)	Czech Republic (96)
2013–14	Czech Republic (114)	—	Italy (91)
2013–14	Norway (114)	—	Italy (91)
2014–15	Norway (216)	France (197)	Czech Republic (174)
2015–16	Norway (264)	Germany (252)	France (223)
2016–17	Germany (264)	France (257)	Austria (201)
2017–18	Italy (188)	Norway (188)	France (179)
2018–19	Norway (306)	France (281)	Italy (266)
2019–20	Norway (307)	France (272)	Germany (265)
2020–21	Norway (228)	France (211)	Sweden (210)
2021–22	Norway (205)	Sweden (191)	France (169)
2022–23	France (305)	Norway (280)	Switzerland (217)
2023–24	Norway (465)	France (366)	Sweden (364)
2024–25	Sweden (439)	France (430)	Norway (341)
2025–26	Norway (385)	Sweden (376)	France (342)

Statistics by country

Rank	Nation	Gold	Silver	Bronze	Total
1	Norway	10	2	1	13
2	France	2	8	4	14
3	Sweden	1	2	3	6
4	Germany	1	2	2	5
5	Russia	1	1	0	2
6	Czech Republic	1	0	2	3
6	Italy	1	0	2	3
8	Austria	0	0	1	1
8	Switzerland	0	0	1	1
Totals (9 entries)		17	15	16	48

== Nations Cup ==
=== Men's Nations Cup ===
Season	Winner	Runner-up	Third place
1985–86	East Germany	—	
1986–87	East Germany	—	
1987–88	West Germany	—	
1988–89	East Germany	Soviet Union	West Germany
1989–90	East Germany	East Germany	Italy
1990–91	Italy	Germany	France
1991–92	Norway	Italy	France
1992–93	Germany	Italy	Russia
1993–94	Germany	Italy	Russia
1994–95	Italy (2)	Germany	Russia
1995–96	Russia	Germany	Norway
1996–97	Germany	Russia	Norway
1997–98	Norway	Germany	Russia
1998–99	Germany	Norway	Russia
1999–00	Germany	Norway	Russia
2000–01	Norway	Germany	Russia
2001–02	Germany	Norway	Russia
2002–03	Norway	Germany	Russia
2003–04	Norway	Germany	Russia
2004–05	Norway	Germany	Russia
2005–06	Germany	Norway	Russia
2006–07	Russia	Germany	Norway
2007–08	Norway	Russia	Germany
2008–09	Norway	Austria	Germany
2009–10	Norway	Russia	Austria
2010–11	Norway	Germany	Russia
2011–12	Russia	France	Germany
2012–13	Russia (4)	Norway	France
2013–14	Norway	Germany	Austria
2014–15	Norway	Germany	France
2015–16	Norway	Germany	Russia
2016–17	Germany (12)	France	Russia
2017–18	Norway	France	Germany
2018–19	Norway	France	Germany
2019–20	Norway	France	Germany
2020–21	Norway	France	Germany
2021–22	Norway	France	Germany
2022–23	Norway	France	Germany
2023–24	Norway	Germany	France
2024–25	France	Norway	Sweden
2025–26	Norway (21)	France (8)	Sweden (2)

Rank	Nation	Gold	Silver	Bronze	Total
1	Norway	21	6	3	30
2	Germany	12	15	10	37
3	Russia	4	3	15	22
4	Italy	2	3	1	6
5	France	1	9	5	15
6	Soviet Union	1	1	0	2
7	Austria	0	1	2	3
8	Sweden	0	0	2	2
Totals (8 entries)		41	38	38	117

=== Women's Nations Cup ===
Season	Winner	Runner-up	Third place
1985–86	—		
1986–87	—		
1987–88	Bulgaria	—	
1988–89	Soviet Union	Bulgaria	Norway
1989–90	Soviet Union	Finland	West Germany
1990–91	Germany	Norway	France
1991–92	Norway	Germany	France
1992–93	France	Russia	Czech Republic
1993–94	Germany	France	Russia
1994–95	France	Germany	Russia
1995–96	France	Germany	Ukraine
1996–97	Germany	Russia	Norway
1997–98	Germany	Russia	France
1998–99	Germany	Russia	Ukraine
1999–00	Germany	Russia	Ukraine
2000–01	Germany	Russia	Ukraine
2001–02	Germany	Russia	Norway
2002–03	Russia	Germany	France
2003–04	Russia	Germany	Norway
2004–05	Russia	Germany	Norway
2005–06	Germany	Russia	France
2006–07	Germany	Russia	France
2007–08	Germany	Russia	France
2008–09	Germany	Sweden	France
2009–10	Germany	Russia	France
2010–11	Germany	Russia (12)	Sweden
2011–12	Russia (4)	Germany	France
2012–13	Norway	Germany	Russia (3)
2013–14	Norway	Germany	Ukraine
2014–15	Germany	Czech Republic	France
2015–16	Germany	France	Czech Republic (2)
2016–17	Germany	France	Ukraine (6)
2017–18	Germany (18)	France	Italy
2018–19	Norway	Germany	France
2019–20	Norway	Germany (11)	France
2020–21	Norway	Sweden	Germany
2021–22	Norway (7)	Sweden	France (14)
2022–23	France	Sweden	Norway
2023–24	France	Norway (2)	Sweden (2)
2024–25	France (6)	Sweden (5)	Germany (3)
2025–26	Sweden	France (5)	Norway (7)

Rank	Nation	Gold	Silver	Bronze	Total
1	Germany	18	11	3	32
2	Norway	7	2	7	16
3	France	6	5	14	25
4	Russia	4	12	3	19
5	Soviet Union	2	0	0	2
6	Sweden	1	5	2	8
7	Bulgaria	1	1	0	2
8	Czech Republic	0	1	2	3
9	Finland	0	1	0	1
10	Ukraine	0	0	6	6
11	Italy	0	0	1	1
Totals (11 entries)		39	38	38	115

== Race winners ==
Below is a list of all male and female biathletes that have won eight or more individual World Cup, World Championships or Olympic races. Biathletes whose names are highlighted in light blue are still active.

- Updated: 22 March 2026

=== Men ===
Rank	Men	Career	Wins	IN	SP	PU	MS
1	(Norway) Ole Einar Bjørndalen	1993–2018	95	8	36	37	14
2	(Norway) Johannes Thingnes Bø	2013–2025	91	8	40	27	16
3	(France) Martin Fourcade	2008–2020	84	15	23	30	16
4	(France) Raphaël Poirée	1995–2007	44	7	13	15	9
5	(Norway) Emil Hegle Svendsen	2005–2018	38	8	11	12	7
6	(Germany) Sven Fischer	1992–2007	33	6	13	10	4
7	(Norway) Sturla Holm Laegreid	2020–active	21	4	5	9	3
8	(France) Quentin Fillon Maillet	2013–active	19	1	6	10	2
9	(East Germany) Frank Ullrich	1978–1984	17	6	11	N/A	N/A
10	(East Germany) Frank-Peter Roetsch	1983–1992	15	4	11	N/A	N/A
	(Russia) (Belarus) Vladimir Drachev	1988–2006	15	4	8	2	1
	(Norway) Tarjei Bø	2009–2025	15	1	8	2	4
	(Norway) Frode Andresen	1993–2011	15	–	11	4	–
14	(Norway) Eirik Kvalfoss	1981–1994	14	4	10	N/A	N/A
15	(East Germany) (Germany) Frank Luck	1987–2004	12	1	9	2	–
	(Germany) Simon Schempp	2009–2021	12	–	5	4	3
17	(West Germany) Peter Angerer	1980–1988	11	8	3	N/A	N/A
	(East Germany) (Germany) Mark Kirchner	1989–1998	11	6	5	–	–
	(Germany) Michael Greis	2001–2012	11	3	4	2	2
	(Germany) Arnd Peiffer	2009–2021	11	1	7	2	1
	(Russia) Anton Shipulin	2009–2018	11	1	4	5	1
22	(Norway) Halvard Hanevold	1992–2010	9	4	2	1	2
	(Germany) Ricco Groß	1990–2007	9	3	1	4	1
	(Slovenia) Jakov Fak	2006–active	9	2	3	2	2
25	(East Germany) Klaus Siebert	1975–1980	8	6	2	N/A	N/A
	(France) Éric Perrot	2021–active	8	3	1	1	3
	(Belarus) (Russia) Viktor Maigourov	1989–2003	8	1	4	3	–
	(Sweden) Sebastian Samuelsson	2016–active	8	–	3	3	2

=== Women ===
Rank	Women	Career	Wins	IN	SP	PU	MS
1	(Sweden) Magdalena Forsberg	1994–2002	42	7	13	19	3
2	(Belarus) Darya Domracheva	2006–2018	34	4	9	11	10
	(Germany) Magdalena Neuner	2006–2012	34	1	18	7	8
4	(Germany) Uschi Disl	1989–2006	30	9	12	7	2
5	(Norway) Tiril Eckhoff	2011–2022	29	1	14	11	3
6	(Norway) Tora Berger	2001–2014	28	5	7	9	7
7	(Finland) Kaisa Mäkäräinen	2005–2020	27	2	8	13	4
8	(Germany) Andrea Henkel	1995–2014	22	4	5	8	5
	(Germany) Laura Dahlmeier	2013–2019	22	3	4	11	4
	(Norway) Liv Grete Skjelbreid	1993–2006	22	1	10	8	3
11	(Ukraine) (Belarus) Olena Zubrilova	1992–2006	21	3	6	8	4
	(Germany) Kati Wilhelm	2000–2010	21	1	11	6	3
13	(France) Sandrine Bailly	2000–2010	20	1	9	9	1
14	(France) Julia Simon	2017–active	19	3	3	7	6
	(Norway) Marte Olsbu Røiseland	2012–2023	19	–	8	9	2
16	(Slovakia) Anastasiya Kuzmina	2006–active	18	–	10	5	3
17	(Czech Republic) Gabriela Soukalová	2009–2017	17	2	7	4	4
	(Italy) Dorothea Wierer	2009–2026	17	7	4	2	4
19	(Sweden) Hanna Öberg	2016–active	15	4	6	1	4
	(Germany) Martina Beck	2000–2010	15	3	4	6	2
	(France) Lou Jeanmonnot	2021–active	15	2	3	8	2
22	(France) Justine Braisaz-Bouchet	2014–active	14	3	5	1	5
	(Sweden) Elvira Öberg	2019–active	14	1	3	5	5
24	(Sweden) Helena Ekholm	2005–2012	13	4	2	3	4
	(Germany) Denise Herrmann-Wick	2016–2023	13	2	7	4	–
	(Russia) Olga Zaitseva	2000–2014	13	2	5	4	2
27	(Sweden) Anna Carin Zidek	2002–2011	12	2	6	2	2
	(Italy) Lisa Vittozzi	2014–active	12	3	2	6	1
29	(Germany) Petra Behle	1987–1998	11	4	7	–	–
	(Commonwealth of Independent States) (Russia) Anfisa Reztsova	1991–1995	11	3	8	N/A	N/A
31	(Russia) Olga Medvedtseva	2000–2010	10	1	4	4	1
32	(Belarus) Svetlana Paramygina	1989–2001	9	4	5	–	–
	(Russia) Galina Kukleva	1993–2003	9	1	6	1	1
34	(Soviet Union) Elena Golovina	1985–1992	8	5	3	N/A	N/A
	(Norway) Anne Elvebakk	1986–1994	8	3	5	N/A	N/A
	(France) Corinne Niogret	1989–2004	8	3	2	2	1
	(Norway) Linda Grubben	2000–2007	8	1	3	2	2

== Most wins & podiums in a season ==
=== Most wins in a season ===
==== Men ====
	Season	Wins	IN	SP	PU	MS
(Norway) Johannes Thingnes Bø	2022–23	19	2/3	8/8	7/8	2/4
(Norway) Johannes Thingnes Bø	2018–19	16	1/3	7/9	5/8	3/5
(France) Martin Fourcade	2016–17	14	1/3	5/9	6/9	2/5
(Norway) Ole Einar Bjørndalen	2004–05	12	1/3	5/7	4/7	2/3
(Norway) Ole Einar Bjørndalen	2002–03	11	0/3	4/9	4/5	3/4
(France) Raphaël Poirée	2003–04	11	2/3	3/10	4/9	2/4
(Norway) Ole Einar Bjørndalen	2006–07	11	1/3	4/6	4/6	2/4
(France) Martin Fourcade	2017–18	11	1/3	2/9	5/8	3/6
(Norway) Johannes Thingnes Bø	2023–24	11	2/4	1/8	5/8	3/5
(France) Martin Fourcade	2012–13	10	3/3	3/10	2/8	2/5
(France) Martin Fourcade	2015–16	10	2/3	3/9	4/8	1/5
(Norway) Johannes Thingnes Bø	2019–20	10	1/3	4/6	2/4	3/4
(France) Quentin Fillon Maillet	2021–22	10	1/3	3/10	6/8	0/5

==== Women ====
	Season	Wins	IN	SP	PU	MS
(Sweden) Magdalena Forsberg	2000–01	14	2/4	4/10	6/7	2/4
(Norway) Tiril Eckhoff	2020–21	13	0/3	7/10	6/8	0/5
(Norway) Tora Berger	2012–13	11	2/3	2/10	4/8	3/5
(Germany) Magdalena Neuner	2011–12	10	0/3	8/10	1/8	1/5
(Germany) Laura Dahlmeier	2016–17	10	3/3	2/8	4/8	1/5
(Sweden) Magdalena Forsberg	2001–02	9	2/3	1/8	5/8	1/3
(Belarus) Darya Domracheva	2014–15	9	1/3	2/10	4/7	2/5
(Ukraine) Olena Zubrilova	1998–99	8	1/3	2/9	4/9	1/2
(Norway) Marte Olsbu Røiseland	2021–22	8	0/2	3/10	5/8	0/4
(France) Lou Jeanmonnot	2024–25	8	2/4	1/8	4/7	1/6
(Norway) Liv Grete Poirée	2003–04	7	0/3	3/10	3/9	1/4
(Germany) Magdalena Neuner	2006–07	7	0/2	3/10	3/8	1/4
(Belarus) Darya Domracheva	2013–14	7	1/3	2/9	2/8	2/4
(Norway) Tiril Eckhoff	2019–20	7	0/3	2/8	3/5	2/4

=== Most podiums in a season ===
==== Men ====
	Season	Podiums	Gold (gold)	Silver (silver)	Bronze (bronze)
(Norway) Johannes Thingnes Bø	2022–23	22	19	0	3
(France) Martin Fourcade	2016–17	22	14	3	5
(France) Martin Fourcade	2017–18	22	11	8	3
(Norway) Johannes Thingnes Bø	2018–19	19	16	3	0
(France) Martin Fourcade	2012–13	19	10	5	4
(Norway) Johannes Thingnes Bø	2017–18	17	9	4	4
(France) Martin Fourcade	2015–16	16	10	5	1
(France) Quentin Fillon Maillet	2021–22	16	10	5	1
(Norway) Ole Einar Bjørndalen	2004–05	15	12	2	1
(France) Raphaël Poirée	2003–04	15	11	4	0
(Norway) Johannes Thingnes Bø	2023–24	15	11	2	2
(Norway) Ole Einar Bjørndalen	2000–01	15	8	6	1
(Norway) Ole Einar Bjørndalen	2008–09	15	7	6	2
(France) Martin Fourcade	2013–14	15	7	5	3
(Norway) Johannes Thingnes Bø	2024–25	15	6	3	6
(Norway) Sturla Holm Lægreid	2022–23	15	1	8	6

==== Women ====
	Season	Podiums	Gold (gold)	Silver (silver)	Bronze (bronze)
(Sweden) Magdalena Forsberg	2000–01	19	14	2	3
(Norway) Tora Berger	2012–13	19	11	4	4
(Germany) Magdalena Neuner	2011–12	18	10	2	6
(Norway) Tiril Eckhoff	2020–21	17	13	3	1
(Germany) Laura Dahlmeier	2016–17	17	10	6	1
(Sweden) Magdalena Forsberg	2001–02	17	9	3	5
(Norway) Marte Olsbu Røiseland	2021–22	17	8	2	7
(Belarus) Darya Domracheva	2011–12	17	6	5	6
(Norway) Liv Grete Poirée	2003–04	15	7	5	3
(Germany) Kati Wilhelm	2005–06	15	6	9	0
(Germany) Franziska Preuß	2024–25	15	5	5	5

== Most starts ==
List of top 15 most started all male and female biathletes in individual World Cup or Olympic races. Biathletes whose names are highlighted in light blue are still active.

- Updated: 22 March 2026

Rank	Men	Career	Starts
1	(Norway) Ole Einar Bjørndalen	1993–2018	478
2	(Austria) Simon Eder	2004–2026	434
3	(Italy) Lukas Hofer	2009–active	366
4	(Norway) Halvard Hanevold	1992–2010	348
	(Slovenia) Jakov Fak	2007–active	348
6	(Poland) Tomasz Sikora	1993–2012	345
7	(Czech Republic) Michal Šlesingr	2002–2020	329
8	(Norway) Tarjei Bø	2009–2025	326
9	(Germany) Ricco Groß	1991–2007	322
	(Austria) Daniel Mesotitsch	2000–2018	322
11	(Norway) Frode Andresen	1993–2012	318
12	(Czech Republic) Ondřej Moravec	2003–2021	313
13	(Latvia) Ilmārs Bricis	1992–2018	311
14	(Bulgaria) Vladimir Iliev	2007–active	307
15	(France) Quentin Fillon Maillet	2014–active	305

Rank	Women	Career	Starts
1	(Poland) Magdalena Gwizdoń	1996–2022	422
2	(Germany) Andrea Henkel	1995–2014	377
3	(Finland) Kaisa Mäkäräinen	2005–2020	358
4	(Romania) Éva Tófalvi	1997–2018	340
5	(Italy) Dorothea Wierer	2009–2026	334
6	(Italy) Michela Ponza	1998–2014	318
7	(Slovenia) Teja Gregorin	2004–2017	316
8	(Germany) Uschi Disl	1989–2006	303
9	(Italy) (Belgium) Nathalie Santer	1990–2008	292
10	(France) Anais Bescond	2007–2022	289
11	(Ukraine) Valentyna Semerenko	2006–2022	285
12	(Slovenia) Andreja Mali	2002–2016	281
13	(Austria) Lisa Theresa Hauser	2014–2026	280
14	(Ukraine) Yuliia Dzhima	2012–active	260
15	(Norway) Tora Berger	2002–2014	258

== See also ==
- Biathlon World Championships
- List of Olympic medalists in biathlon
