= Siv Bråten Lunde =

Norwegian biathlete

Medal record

Women's biathlon

Representing Norway

World Championships
Silver medal – second place	1986 Falun	10 km individual
Silver medal – second place	1985 Egg am Etzl	3 × 5 km relay
Silver medal – second place	1984 Chamonix	3 × 5 km relay
Bronze medal – third place	1987 Lahti	3 × 5 km relay
Bronze medal – third place	1986 Falun	3 × 5 km relay

Siv Bråten Lunde (born 31 December 1960) is a former Norwegian biathlete who received five medals in the world championships during her career. She is now a teacher at Trysil Ungdomsskole. She has also helped Nikolai Hansen Bakken.

== World championships ==
She participated in the Norwegian team that won silver and bronze medals in the 3 × 5 km relay in 1984, 1985, 1986 and 1987. She won a silver medal in the 10 km individual at the 1986 Biathlon World Championships 1986 in Falun.

== World cup ==
Siv Bråten Lunde finished second in the overall Biathlon World Cup in the 1982/83 season.

== National championships ==
She was Norwegian champion six times.

Her two individual national titles in 1986 and 1987 both earned her the Kongepokal trophy.

== Personal life ==
She married Ola Lunde on 5 July 1986.
