= Kari Swenson =

American biathlete

Personal information
- Born: 1961 (age 64–65)
- Occupations: Biathlete, veterinarian

Sport
- Sport: Biathlon
Medal record
Biathlon
Representing United States
Biathlon World Championships
Bronze medal – third place	1984 Chamonix	3 x 5 km relay

Kari Swenson (born 1961) is an American veterinarian and former biathlete who earned a bronze medal as a member of the 1984 United States relay team competing in the first women's Biathlon World Championships in Chamonix, France. She placed fifth overall in the women's 10-km final, which, at the time, marked the best performance for an American biathlete of either sex in twenty-six years of international biathlon competition. In 2015, Swenson and her 1984 teammates were inducted into the U.S. Biathlon Hall of Fame.

In 1984, Swenson was abducted and held captive for eighteen hours by survivalist Don Nichols and his son, Dan. Her captivity ended when she was shot and left for dead; the captors also killed her friend, Alan Goldstein, who had been involved in the search for her.

In 2020, Swenson married the former German biathlete and coach to Walter Pichler in Ruhpolding Germany. Both met in Oslo 1984 and reunited in 2019.

== Early life ==
Kari Swenson was born in 1961 to Robert Swenson, the head of the physics department at Temple University, and his wife Janet, a nurse; she has two siblings. In 1970, Swenson's family moved to Bozeman, Montana, where her father became head of the physics department at Montana State University. Swenson's mother was also a ski patrol volunteer, and Kari took up cross-country skiing in her youth.

== Biathlon ==
By 1984, Swenson had become a member of the three-woman United States biathlon relay team, competing at the first women's Biathlon World Championships in Chamonix, France. The team earned a bronze medal for their performance in the event. Swenson placed fifth overall in the women's 10-km final, a record performance at the time for an American biathlete of either gender in twenty-six years of international biathlon competition. In 2015, Swenson and her 1984 teammates, Holly Beattie and Julie Newnam, were inducted into the U.S. Biathlon Hall of Fame.

== Abduction ==
Following the 1984 biathlon season, Swenson took a summer job at a guest ranch near Big Sky, Montana, where she could train daily. On July 15, 1984, while on a training run in the Ulerys Lakes area, she was abducted by survivalist Don Nichols and his son Dan, with the aim of forcing Swenson into becoming Dan's bride. When Swenson did not return to her job that evening as expected, a search party was organized.

By the following morning, over twenty searchers were combing the mountains. Swenson's friend Alan Goldstein and a ranch worker, Jim Schwalbe, paired up during the search and stumbled onto the Nicholses' camp. Because the Nicholses had threatened to shoot any rescuers, Swenson shouted to Goldstein and Schwalbe in an attempt to warn them away. She later recounted that Don ordered Dan to "shut me up." The younger Nichols looked directly at Swenson and shot her. "It wasn't an accident," she later said in 2019, in reference to his later defense claiming it was.

As the two rescuers approached, Don Nichols fired a single shot from his rifle, killing Goldstein with a gunshot wound to the face. The impact knocked him backward out of Swenson's sight. Schwalbe managed to escape. Knowing they had been located, the Nicholses unchained Swenson and fled, leaving her for dead. The bullet had entered Swenson's chest just below her collarbone, punctured and collapsed her lung and exited below her shoulder blade.

Swenson remained in the clearing, in pain so intense it prevented her from moving, for four hours before she was rescued. It had been over eighteen hours since her abduction. Swenson later attributed her survival to the breath control skills she developed as a biathlete.

=== Capture and trials ===
Don and Dan Nichols were captured in December 1984. They were tried separately in Virginia City, Montana, prosecuted by Marc Racicot, then a staff attorney for the Montana Attorney General. In May 1985, Dan was sentenced to ten years in prison for kidnapping and misdemeanor assault. In September 1985, Don was sentenced to eighty-five years in prison for kidnapping, murder and aggravated assault. The younger Nichols was released on parole in 1991 and he stayed out of trouble until 2011, when he was arrested on drug charges and sentenced to four years in prison.

Don came up for parole review four times, and each time, the Swenson family and their supporters vigorously opposed his release. On April 27, 2017, the elder Nichols, then eighty-six years old, was granted parole after serving thirty-two years of his sentence. Don was released from prison on August 23, 2017. He died on June 17, 2023.

=== Media coverage ===
Swenson and her family were not pleased by some of the media coverage of her ordeal, feeling it glamorized her abductors as mythical "mountain men" and stereotyped her, a champion athlete, as a "proper Belle." "Using this description in conjunction with these two crazy misfits is truly maligning the mystique and legends of the mountain man," Swenson wrote in a 2012 op-ed. In 1989, her mother authored a book written from the family's perspective, titled Victims: The Kari Swenson Story. In the book, Swenson stated, "the Nichols lived in the mountains part-time but they couldn't survive there, at least not without poaching, breaking into cabins and stealing supplies, leaving the mountains for months at a time and purchasing modern equipment. Ultimately they were caught without a fight because they were cold, hungry, and tired of living in the mountains. These are not mountain men."

A television movie titled The Abduction of Kari Swenson, produced by NBC, aired on March 8, 1987. It starred Tracy Pollan in the leading role as Kari Swenson. Swenson contributed as a technical advisor during production and also filmed her own ski sequences. The A&E documentary series American Justice detailed the story in 1995, reenacting Swenson's abduction and the Nichols’ subsequent trial. Her story was also featured on the Investigation Discovery series Your Worst Nightmare, premiering on February 11, 2017. In 2019 her story was the focus of an ESPN 30 for 30 podcast titled "Out of the Woods." The 30 for 30 podcast episode was also featured in the Criminal episode #128, titled "Deep Breath".

== Later life ==
Following the kidnapping and the immediate aftermath of her injuries, Swenson returned to training, earned a spot on the United States biathlon team and she competed in the 1986 biathlon competition in Oslo, where she finished fourth. That year, she retired from biathlon competitions. She then enrolled at Colorado State University Veterinary School, where she graduated in 1990. After working for five years at a small animal veterinary practice in Steamboat Springs, Colorado, she returned to Montana, and as of 2019, she was a practicing veterinarian in Bozeman.
