= Ridnauntal =

Side valley in South Tyrol, Italy

Coordinates: 46°54′00″N 11°19′48″E

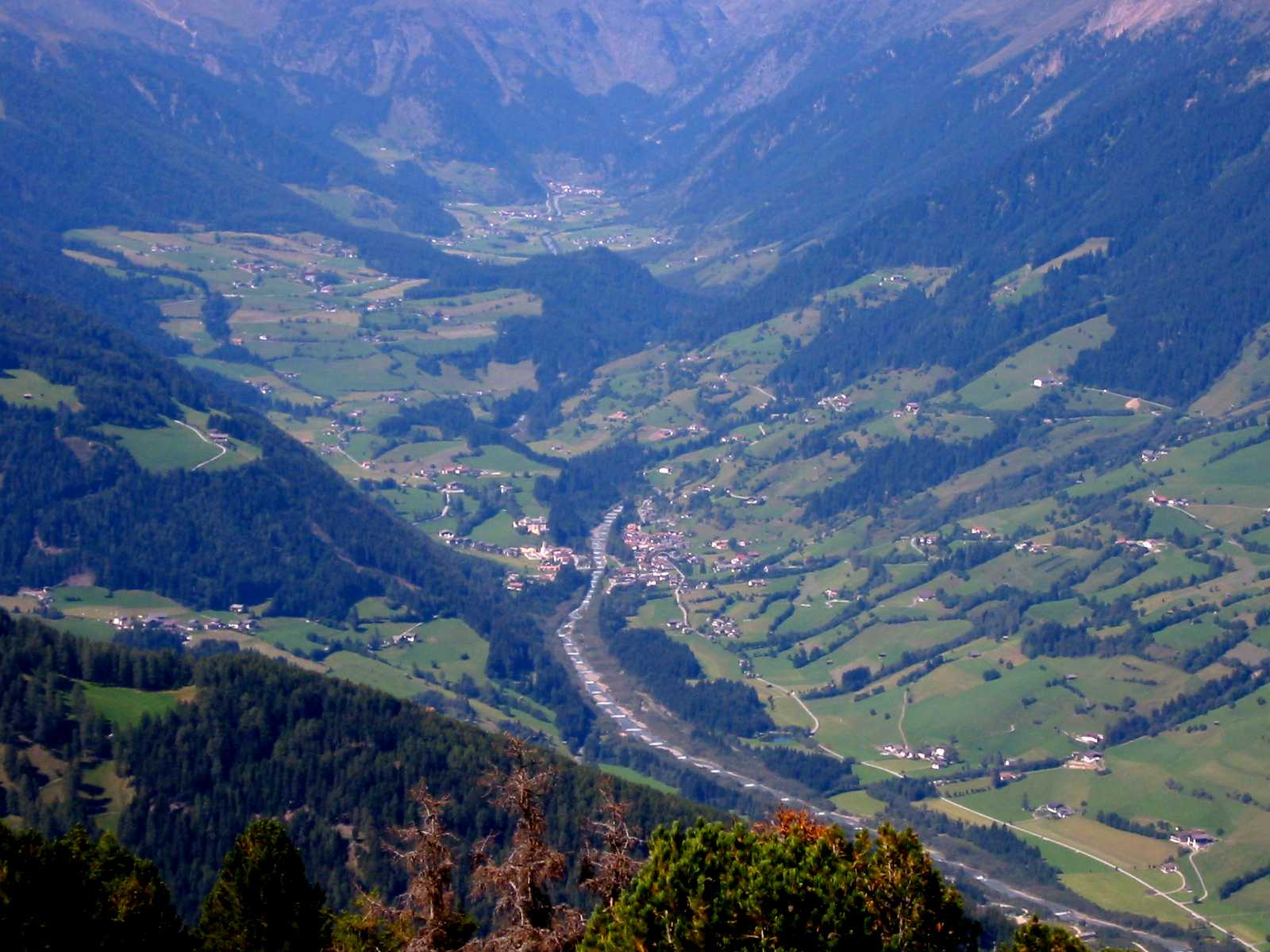
Overview of Ridnauntal

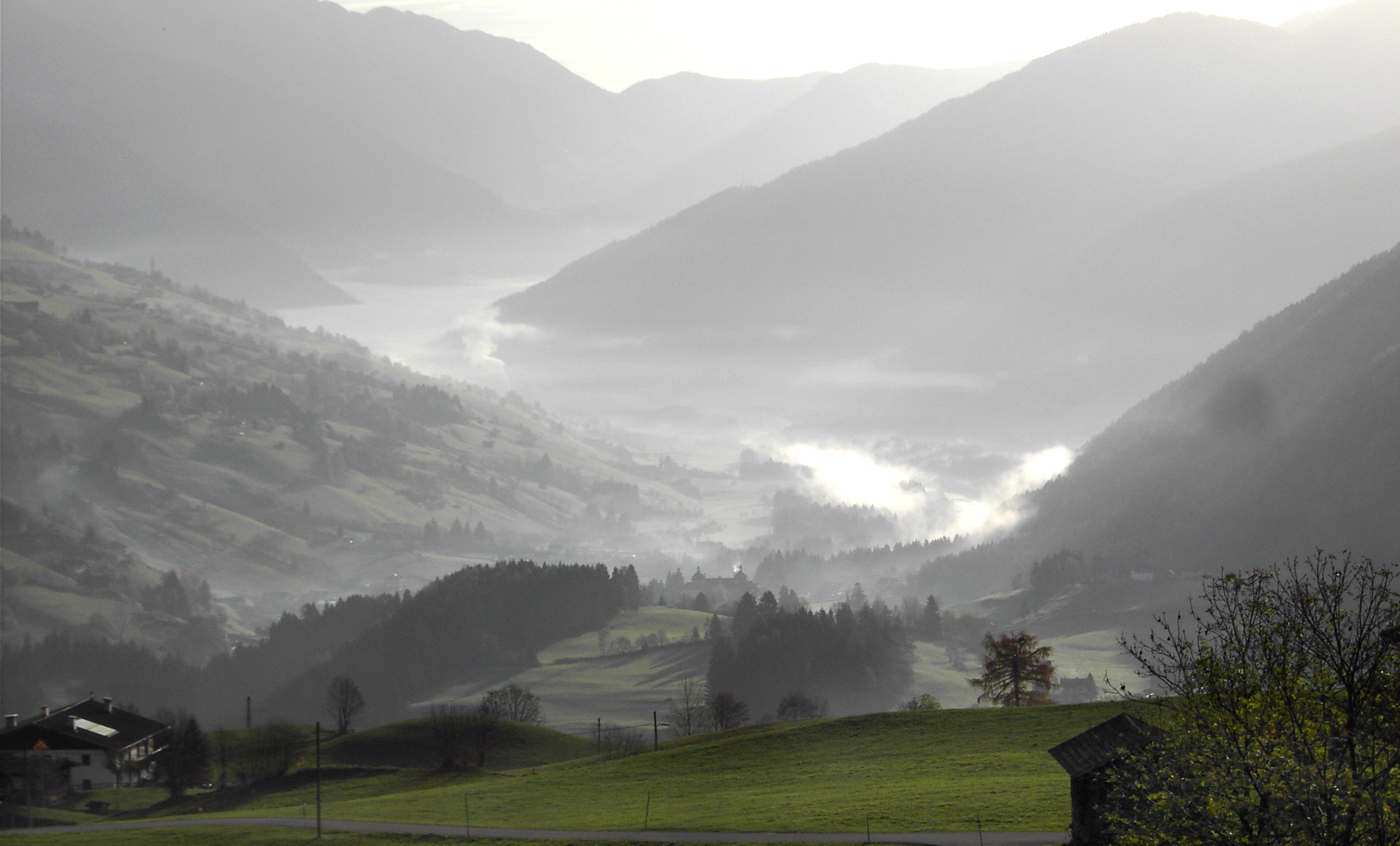
The Ridnauntal in autumn morning mist

The Ridnauntal (Italian: Val Ridanna) is a side valley of the Eisacktal in South Tyrol, Italy. It lies within the municipal boundaries of Ratschings (Italian: Racines) and is a former mining region (silver, zinc), It is nowadays known as a venue for winter sports, biathlon in particular.
