= Biathlon World Championships 1984 =

Edition of the Biathlon World Championships

- Host city: Chamonix
- Country: France
- Events: 3
- Opening: 29 February 1984
- Closing: 4 March 1984

The 1st women's Biathlon World Championships were held in 1984 in Chamonix, France.

== Women's results ==
=== 10 km individual ===
Medal	Name	Nation	Penalties	Result
1st place, gold medalist(s)	Venera Chernyshova	URS	4	44:21.7
2nd place, silver medalist(s)	Liudmila Zabolotnaya	URS	3	+ 9.2
3rd place, bronze medalist(s)	Tatiana Brylina	URS	4	+ 28.3

=== 5 km sprint ===
Medal	Name	Nation	Penalties	Result
1st place, gold medalist(s)	Venera Chernyshova	URS	3	23:00.1
2nd place, silver medalist(s)	Sanna Grønlid	NOR	1	+ 34.9
3rd place, bronze medalist(s)	Andrea Grossegger	AUT	2	+ 39.4

=== 3 × 5 km relay ===
Medal	Name	Nation	Penalties	Result
1st place, gold medalist(s)	Soviet Union Venera Chernyshova; Liudmila Zabolotnaya; Kaija Parve	URS		
2nd place, silver medalist(s)	Norway Sanna Grønlid; Gry Østvik; Siv Bråten	NOR		
3rd place, bronze medalist(s)	United States Holly Beatie; Julie Newman; Kari Swenson	USA		

== Medal table ==
Place	Nation	1st place, gold medalist(s)	2nd place, silver medalist(s)	3rd place, bronze medalist(s)	Total
1	Soviet Union	3	1	1	5
2	Norway	0	2	0	2
3	Austria	0	0	1	1
3	United States	0	0	1	1
