= Windische Höhe Pass =

Mountain pass in the Gailtal Alps in Austria

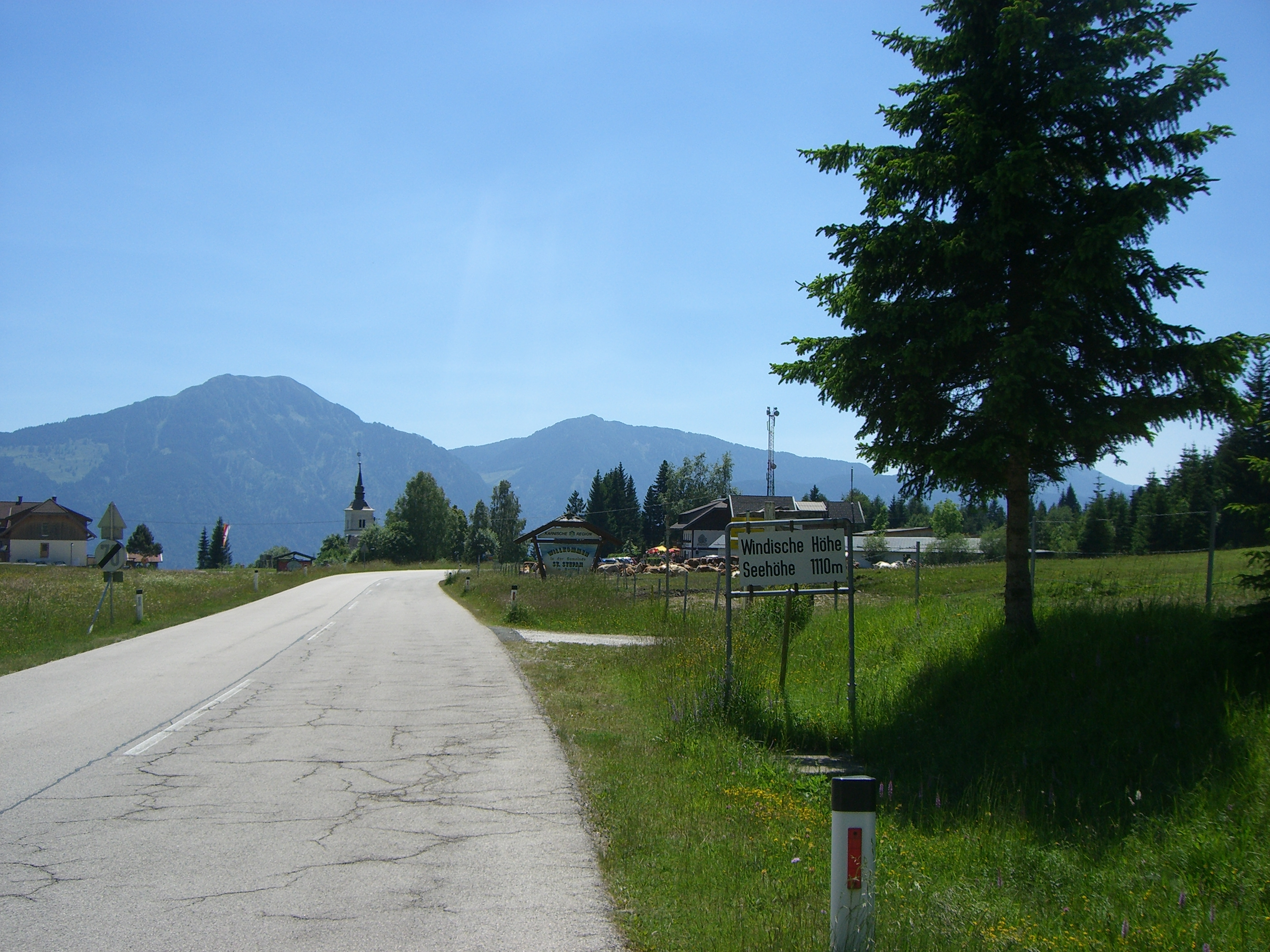
- Windische Höhe Pass

- Location within Austria
- Elevation: 1,110 m (3,640 ft)

Third Approach
- Location: Austria
- Range: Alps
- Coordinates: 46°38′N 13°32′E

Windische Höhe Pass (elevation 1,110 metres [3,642 ft]) is a high mountain pass in the Austrian Alps, located in the state of Carinthia (Kärnten). The pass connects St. Stefan in the Gail River valley with Feistritz an der Drau in the Drau River valley.

== See also ==
- List of highest paved roads in Europe
- List of mountain passes
