= Jiřína Adamičková-Pelcová =

Czech biathlete (born 1969)

Personal information
- Born: 22 November 1969 (age 56) Jablonec nad Nisou, Czechoslovakia
- Height: 173 cm (5 ft 8 in)

Sport
- Sport: Skiing

World Cup career
- Indiv. wins: 1 (1989–90)
Medal record
Women's biathlon
Representing Czechoslovakia and Czech Republic
World Championships
| Gold medal – first place | 1993 Borovets | 4 × 7.5 km relay |
| Bronze medal – third place | 1989 Feitritz | 3 × 7.5 km relay |
| Bronze medal – third place | 1992 Novosibirsk | Team event |

Jiřina Adamičková-Pelcová (born 22 November 1969) is a Czech retired biathlete who competed for Czechoslovakia and later the Czech Republic.

She has participated in three editions of the Winter Olympics (1992, 1994, 1998). Pelcová won the Overall World Cup in 1989–90 World Cup season. Pelcová claimed 2 medals at Biathlon World Championships: one gold and one bronze.
