= Nadiya Billova =

Ukrainian biathlete (born 1961)

Personal information
- Full name: Nadiya Oleksandriwna Billova
- Nationality: Ukrainian
- Born: 2 September 1961 (age 65) Petropavl, Kazakh SSR, Soviet Union
- Height: 162 cm (5 ft 4 in)
- Weight: 55 kg (121 lb)

Sport
- Sport: Biathlon
Medal record
Women's biathlon
Representing Soviet Union
World Championships
Gold medal – first place	1986 Falun	3x5 km relay
Silver medal – second place	1986 Falun	5km sprint

Nadiya Oleksandrivna Billova (Ukrainian: Надія Олександрівна Бєлова; born 2 September 1961) is a Ukrainian former biathlete and biathlon coach. She competed in the women's individual event at the 1994 Winter Olympics. She also previously competed at the 1986 Biathlon World Championships for the Soviet Union, where she was part of the gold medal-winning Soviet women's relay team, and also took the silver in the sprint competition. After retiring from competition she embarked on a career as a coach, becoming one of the few female biathlon coaches working at the elite level: she has had spells coaching the Ukrainian women's and men's teams, as well as the Polish women's team. During her time with the Ukrainian women's team she coached the squad alongside her husband, Roman Bondaruk. She was named the Polish Olympic Committee's Coach of the Year in 2006 and coached the Ukrainian women's team to success at the 2014 Winter Olympics, where they took the gold medal in the relay and Vita Semerenko also took the bronze in the sprint. In May 2019 the Polish Biathlon Association announced that Billova had been forced to leave her role as the Polish women's team coach after a year for health reasons.

In April 2024 it was announced that Billova will take the place of the head coach of the Ukrainian men's national biathlon team, replacing Slovak coach Juraj Sanitra.
