= Anders Mannelqvist =

Swedish biathlete (born 1964)

Personal information
- Nationality: Swedish
- Born: 27 August 1964 (age 60); Vilhelmina, Sweden

Sport
- Sport: Biathlon

Anders Mannelqvist (born 27 August 1964) is a Swedish biathlete. He competed in the men's 20 km individual event at the 1992 Winter Olympics.
