= Stefan Höck =

German biathlete

Olympic medal record

Men's Biathlon
Silver medal – second place	1988 Calgary	4 x 7.5 km relay

Stefan Höck (born 10 May 1963 in Benediktbeuern, Upper Bavaria) is a former German biathlete who represented West Germany at the 1988 Olympics in Calgary. Höck won a silver medal with the West German relay team that consisted of Ernst Reiter, Peter Angerer and Fritz Fischer.
