= Sanna Grønlid =

Norwegian biathlete

Personal information
- Nationality: Norwegian
- Born: 2 May 1959

Sport
- Sport: Biathlon
- Club: Tingelstad Skiskytterlag; Høydalsmo IL
Medal record
Women's biathlon
Representing Norway
World Championships
Gold medal – first place	1987 Lahti	10 km individual
Gold medal – first place	1985 Egg am Etzel	5 km sprint
Silver medal – second place	1985 Egg am Etzel	10 km individual
Silver medal – second place	1985 Egg am Etzel	3 × 5 km relay
Silver medal – second place	1984 Chamonix	5 km sprint
Silver medal – second place	1984 Chamonix	3 × 5 km relay
Bronze medal – third place	1987 Lahti	3 × 5 km relay
Bronze medal – third place	1986 Falun	10 km individual
Bronze medal – third place	1986 Falun	3 × 5 km relay

Sanna Grønlid (born 2 May 1959) is a former Norwegian biathlete, world champion and world cup winner.

== Life and career ==
Born on 2 May 1959, Grønlid represented the clubs Tingelstad Skiskytterlag and Høydalsmo IL. She won five individual world championship medals in biathlon, and a total of nine medals.

=== World championships ===
She received a gold medal in the 5 km sprint at the 1985 Biathlon World Championships in Egg am Etzel, and a gold medal in the 10 km individual at the 1987 Biathlon World Championships 1987 in Lahti. She participated in the Norwegian team that won silver and bronze medals in the 3 × 5 km relay in 1984, 1985, 1986 and 1987.

=== World cup ===
Grønlid won the overall Biathlon World Cup in the 1984/85 season. She finished 2nd in 1983/84 and 1985/86, and 3rd in 1986/87.
