= André Sehmisch =

German biathlete

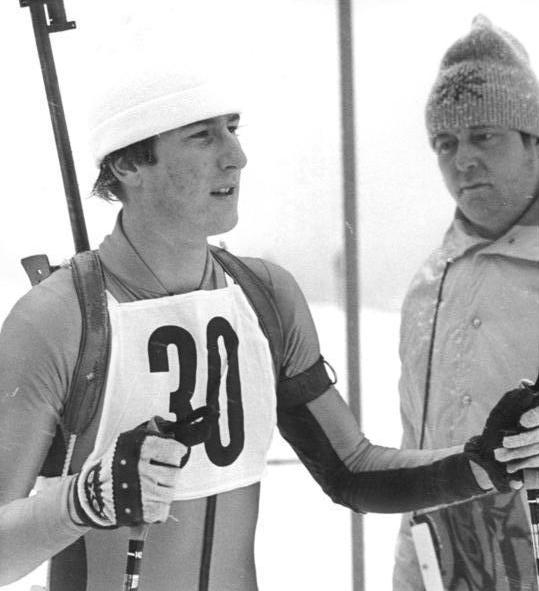

Personal information
- Full name: André Sehmisch
- Born: 27 September 1964 (age 61) Steinheidel-Erlabrunn, East Germany
- Height: 1.85 m (6 ft 1 in)

Sport

Professional information
- Sport: Biathlon
- Club: SV Dynamo
- World Cup debut: 6 January 1984

Olympic Games
- Teams: 1 (1988)
- Medals: 0

World Championships
- Teams: 6 (1985, 1986, 1987, 1989, 1990, 1991)
- Medals: 9 (2 gold)

World Cup
- Seasons: 8 (1983/84–1990/91)
- Individual victories: 2
- Individual podiums: 15
- Overall titles: 1 (1985–86)
Medal record
Men's biathlon
Representing East Germany
World Championships
Gold medal – first place	1987 Lake Placid	4 × 7.5 km relay
Gold medal – first place	1989 Feistritz an der Drau	4 × 7.5 km relay
Silver medal – second place	1985 Ruhpolding	4 × 7.5 km relay
Silver medal – second place	1986 Oslo	20 km individual
Silver medal – second place	1986 Oslo	4 × 7.5 km relay
Bronze medal – third place	1986 Oslo	10 km sprint
Bronze medal – third place	1987 Lake Placid	10 km sprint
Bronze medal – third place	1989 Feistritz an der Drau	Team event
Bronze medal – third place	1990 Kontiolahti	4 × 7.5 km relay

André Sehmisch (born 27 September 1964 in Steinheidel-Erlabrunn) is a former German biathlete.

== Career ==
In 1987 and 1989 he became world champion with the East German relay team. In 1986 he won the overall World Cup. After the German reunification, Sehmisch was passed over for many younger racers. In the 1992–93 season he finished second in the overall European Cup. Sehmisch retired after that season. He later opened a skiing school. He began his career at the SG Dynamo Schwarzenberg / Sportvereinigung (SV) Dynamo.

== Biathlon results ==
All results are sourced from the International Biathlon Union.

=== Olympic Games ===
Event	Individual	Sprint	Relay
(Canada) 1988 Calgary	7th	5th	5th

=== World Championships ===
9 medals (2 gold, 3 silver, 4 bronze)

Event	Individual	Sprint	Team	Relay
(West Germany) 1985 Ruhpolding	11th	15th	—N/a	Silver
(Norway) 1986 Oslo Holmenkollen	Silver	Bronze	—N/a	Silver
(United States) 1987 Lake Placid	23rd	Bronze	—N/a	Gold
(Austria) 1989 Feistritz	—	15th	Bronze	Gold
(Soviet Union) 1990 Minsk	28th	—	—	Bronze
(Finland) 1991 Lahti	11th	—	4th	—

*During Olympic seasons competitions are only held for those events not included in the Olympic program.
**Team was added as an event in 1989.

=== Individual victories ===
2 victories (1 In, 1 Sp)

Season	Date	Location	Discipline	Level
1985–86; 1 victory (1 Sp)	9 March 1986	(Finland) Lahti	10 km sprint	Biathlon World Cup
1989–90; 1 victory (1 In)	14 December 1989	(Austria) Obertilliach	20 km individual	Biathlon World Cup

*Results are from UIPMB and IBU races which include the Biathlon World Cup, Biathlon World Championships and the Winter Olympic Games.
