= Venera Chernyshova =

Soviet biathlete (born 1954)

Personal information
- Full name: Venera Mikhailovna Chernyshova
- Born: 5 March 1954 (age 72) Molotov, RSFSR, Soviet Union

Sport

Professional information
- Sport: Biathlon

World Championships
- Teams: 5 (1984, 1985, 1986, 1987, 1988)
- Medals: 10 (7 gold)
Medal record
Women's biathlon
Representing Soviet Union
World Championships
Gold medal – first place	1988 Chamonix	4 × 7.5 km relay
Gold medal – first place	1987 Lahti	4 × 7.5 km relay
Gold medal – first place	1986 Falun	4 × 7.5 km relay
Gold medal – first place	1985 Egg am Etzel	4 × 7.5 km relay
Gold medal – first place	1984 Chamonix	10 km individual
Gold medal – first place	1984 Chamonix	5 km sprint
Gold medal – first place	1984 Chamonix	4 × 7.5 km relay
Silver medal – second place	1987 Lahti	5 km sprint
Bronze medal – third place	1988 Chamonix	10 km individual
Bronze medal – third place	1985 Egg am Etzel	5 km sprint

Venera Mikhailovna Chernyshova (Russian: Венера Михайловна Чернышова; born 5 March 1954) is a former Soviet biathlete.

Chernyshova was a part of the Soviet biathlon team during the 1980s. In five World Championships for women from 1984 to 1988, Chernyshova won five gold medals with the Soviet relay team.

At the 1984 World Championships Chernyshova became the first female World Champion in the 10 km individual and the 5 km sprint. With the Soviet relay team she also won the first relay at the World Championships for women. Chernyshova also won individual medals at the 1985 World Championships with a bronze in the sprint, at the 1987 World Championships with a silver in the sprint and at the 1988 World Championships with a bronze in the individual.

== Biathlon results ==
All results are sourced from the International Biathlon Union.

=== World Championships ===
10 medals (7 gold, 1 silver, 2 bronze)

Event	Individual	Sprint	Relay
(France) 1984 Chamonix	Gold	Gold	Gold
(Switzerland) 1985 Egg am Etzel	10th	Bronze	Gold
(Sweden) 1986 Falun	6th	4th	Gold
(Finland) 1987 Lahti	5th	Silver	Gold
(France) 1988 Chamonix	Bronze	6th	Gold

*During Olympic seasons competitions are only held for those events not included in the Olympic program.
