= Eva Korpela =

Swedish biathlete

Medal record

Women's biathlon

Representing Sweden

World Championships
Gold medal – first place	1986 Falun	10 km individual
Silver medal – second place	1988 Chamonix	5 km sprint
Silver medal – second place	1987 Lahti	3 × 5 km relay
Silver medal – second place	1986 Falun	3 × 5 km relay
Bronze medal – third place	1988 Chamonix	3 × 5 km relay
Bronze medal – third place	1986 Falun	5 km sprint
Bronze medal – third place	1985 Egg am Etzel	10 km individual

Eva Korpela (born 1958) is a Swedish former biathlete, world champion and world cup winner.

== World championships ==
She received a bronze medal in the 10 km individual at the 1985 Biathlon World Championships in Egg am Etzel, and a gold medal in Falun in 1986.

She received a bronze medal in the 5 km sprint in 1986, and a silver medal in Chamonix in 1988.

She participated in the Swedish team that received silver medals in the 3 × 5 km relay in 1986 and 1987, and a bronze medal in 1988.

== World Cup ==
Korpela won the overall Biathlon World Cup in the 1985/86 season, and again in the 1986/87 season. She finished 2nd in 1984/85.
