= Feistritz an der Drau =

Coordinates: 46°42′N 13°41′E

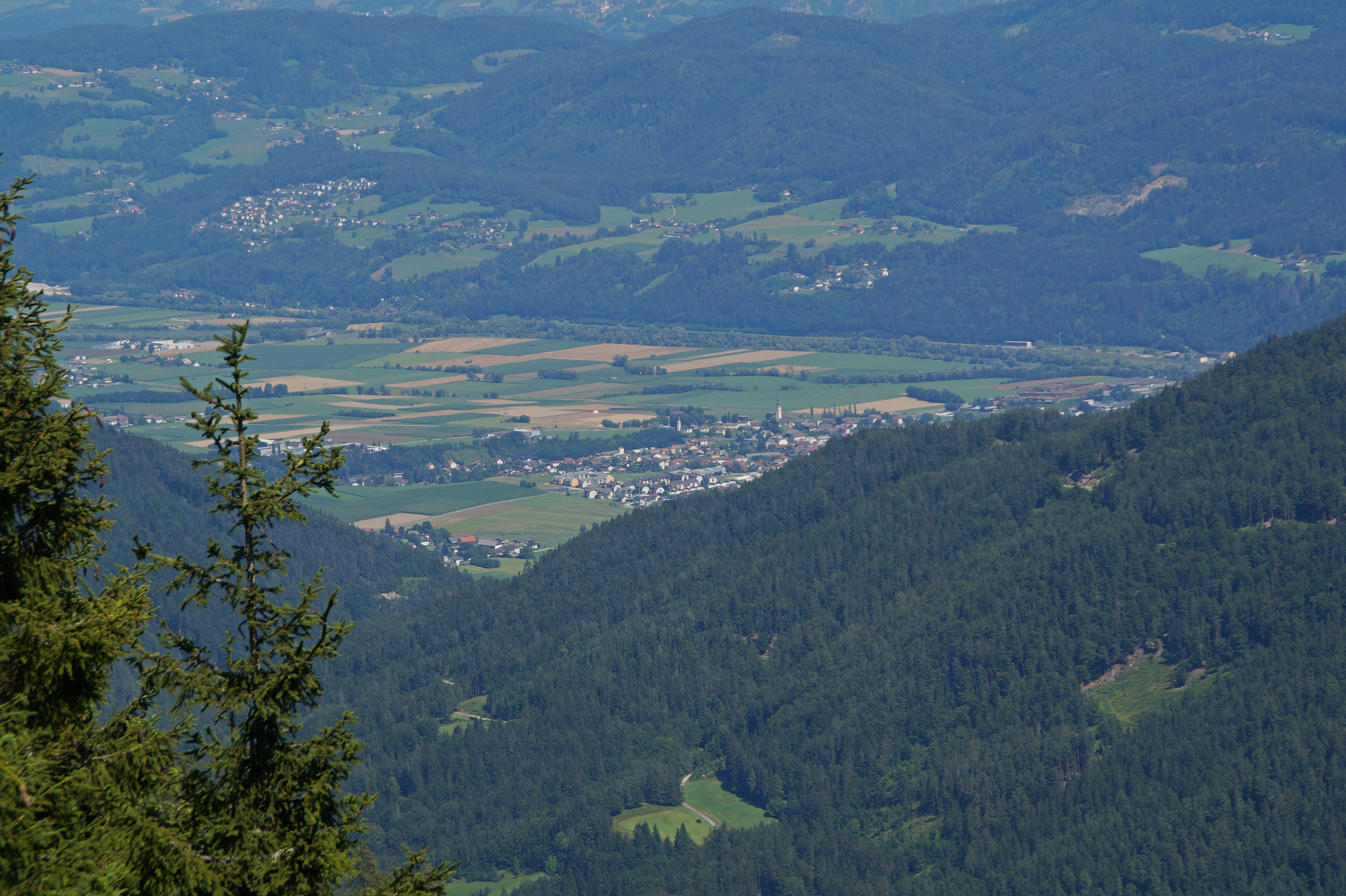
Feistritz an der Drau

Feistritz an der Drau (Slovene: Bistrica na Dravi), often referred to as simply Feistritz (Austrian German: [ˈfaɪstrɪts]), is a village in the municipality of Paternion, in Carinthia, Austria.

The 1989 Biathlon World Championship was held here, the first joint Men and Women Biathlon World Championships.

The Windische Höhe Pass connects St. Stefan in the Gail River valley with Feistritz in the Drau River valley. After World War II, a British sector displaced persons camp was located in Feffernitz, a part of Feistritz.
