= Biathlon World Championships 1988 =

1988 edition of the Biathlon World Championships

- Host city: Chamonix
- Country: France
- Events: 3
- Opening: 29 February 1988
- Closing: 6 March 1988

The 5th women's world championships were held in 1988 for the second time in Chamonix, France. This was the last time that separate world championships were held for women.

== Women's results ==
=== 10 km individual ===
Medal	Name	Nation	Penalties	Result
1st place, gold medalist(s)	Anne Elvebakk	NOR		
2nd place, silver medalist(s)	Elin Kristiansen	NOR		
3rd place, bronze medalist(s)	Venera Chernyshova	URS		

=== 5 km sprint ===
Medal	Name	Nation	Penalties	Result
1st place, gold medalist(s)	Petra Schaaf	FRG		
2nd place, silver medalist(s)	Eva Korpela	SWE		
3rd place, bronze medalist(s)	Anne Elvebakk	NOR		

=== 3 × 5 km relay ===
Medal	Name	Nation	Penalties	Result
1st place, gold medalist(s)	Soviet Union Venera Chernyshova; Elena Golovina; Kaija Parve	URS		
2nd place, silver medalist(s)	Norway Elin Kristiansen; Anne Elvebakk; Mona Bollerud	NOR		
3rd place, bronze medalist(s)	Sweden Eva Korpela; Inger Björkbom; Sabiene Karlsson	SWE		

== Medal table ==
Place	Nation	1st place, gold medalist(s)	2nd place, silver medalist(s)	3rd place, bronze medalist(s)	Total
1	Norway	1	2	1	4
2	Soviet Union	1	0	1	2
3	West Germany	1	0	0	1
4	Sweden	0	1	1	2
