= Biathlon World Championships 1986 =

22nd edition of the Biathlon World Championships

- Host city: Oslo (men); Falun (women)
- Country: Norway (men); Sweden (women)
- Events: 6
- Opening: 18 February 1986 (men); 18 February 1986 (women)
- Closing: 23 February 1986 (men); 26 February 1986 (women)

The 22nd Biathlon World Championships for men were held in 1986 in Oslo, Norway. The 3rd women's world championships were held in Falun, Sweden.

== Men's results ==
=== 20 km individual ===
Medal	Name	Nation	Penalties	Result
1st place, gold medalist(s)	Valeriy Medvedtsev	URS	2	57:05.3
2nd place, silver medalist(s)	André Sehmisch	GDR	1	57:19.2
3rd place, bronze medalist(s)	Alfred Eder	AUT	0	58:38.1

=== 10 km sprint ===
Medal	Name	Nation	Penalties	Result
1st place, gold medalist(s)	Valeriy Medvedtsev	URS	0	28:02.8
2nd place, silver medalist(s)	Franz Schuler	AUT	1	28:55.3
3rd place, bronze medalist(s)	André Sehmisch	GDR	1	28:59.9

Peter Angerer, West Germany, was stripped of silver due to use of a forbidden substance.

=== 4 × 7.5 km relay ===
Medal	Name	Nation	Penalties	Result
1st place, gold medalist(s)	Soviet Union Juri Kashkarov; Dmitry Vasilyev; Valeriy Medvedtsev; Sergei Bulygin	URS		
2nd place, silver medalist(s)	East Germany Jürgen Wirth; Frank-Peter Roetsch; Matthias Jacob; André Sehmisch	GDR		
3rd place, bronze medalist(s)	Italy Werner Kiem; Gottlieb Taschler; Johann Passler; Andreas Zingerle	ITA		

The West German team was stripped of bronze due to Peter Angerer's use of a forbidden substance.

== Women's results ==
=== 10 km individual ===
Medal	Name	Nation	Penalties	Result
1st place, gold medalist(s)	Eva Korpela	SWE	1	37:46.9
2nd place, silver medalist(s)	Siv Bråten	NOR	0	+ 1:00.4
3rd place, bronze medalist(s)	Sanna Grønlid	NOR	2	+ 1:32.7

=== 5 km sprint ===
Medal	Name	Nation	Penalties	Result
1st place, gold medalist(s)	Kaija Parve	URS	1	20:07.0
2nd place, silver medalist(s)	Nadiya Billova	URS	1	+ 46.2
3rd place, bronze medalist(s)	Eva Korpela	SWE	2	+ 1:18.0

=== 3 × 5 km relay ===
Medal	Name	Nation	Penalties	Result
1st place, gold medalist(s)	Soviet Union Kaija Parve; Nadiya Billova; Venera Chernyshova	URS		
2nd place, silver medalist(s)	Sweden Eva Korpela; Inger Björkbom; Sabiene Karlsson	SWE		
3rd place, bronze medalist(s)	Norway Sanna Grønlid; Siv Bråten; Anne Elvebakk	NOR		

== Medal table ==
Place	Nation	1st place, gold medalist(s)	2nd place, silver medalist(s)	3rd place, bronze medalist(s)	Total
1	Soviet Union	5	1	0	6
2	Sweden	1	1	1	3
3	East Germany	0	2	1	3
4	Norway	0	1	2	3
5	Austria	0	1	1	2
6	Italy	0	0	1	1
