= Tuija Vuoksiala =

Finnish biathlete

Personal information
- Nationality: Finnish
- Born: 25 August 1961 (age 63)

Sport
- Sport: Biathlon

Tuija Vuoksiala (born 25 August 1961) is a Finnish biathlete. She competed in three events at the 1994 Winter Olympics.
