= Kaija Parve =

Estonian biathlete (born 1964)

Personal information
- Full name: Kaija Parve-Helinurm
- Born: 14 June 1964 (age 62) Tallinn, then part of Estonian SSR, Soviet Union

Sport
- Sport: Skiing

World Cup career
- Seasons: 1984-88
Medal record
Women's biathlon
Representing Soviet Union
World Championships
Gold medal – first place	1988 Chamonix	3 × 5 km relay
Gold medal – first place	1987 Lahti	3 × 5 km relay
Gold medal – first place	1986 Falun	5 km sprint
Gold medal – first place	1986 Falun	3 × 5 km relay
Gold medal – first place	1985 Egg am Etzel	10 km individual
Gold medal – first place	1985 Egg am Etzel	3 × 5 km relay
Gold medal – first place	1984 Chamonix	3 × 5 km relay
Silver medal – second place	1987 Lahti	10 km individual
Silver medal – second place	1985 Egg am Etzel	5 km sprint
- Updated on April 1, 2012

Kaija Parve-Helinurm (born 14 June 1964, in Tallinn) is a former and so far most successful Estonian biathlete. She used to be a cross-country skier (became Estonian champion in 1983), but after hearing that there was a possibility to participate in World Championships, Parve switched to biathlon. After spending 7 years with Soviet biathlon team, she retired in 1990 due to pregnancy and getting married.

Awards
Preceded by Erika Salumäe	Estonian Sportswoman of the Year; 1985 – 1986	Succeeded by Erika Salumäe
