= Ernst Reiter =

German biathlete

Olympic medal record

Men's Biathlon
Silver medal – second place	1988 Calgary	4 x 7.5 km relay
Bronze medal – third place	1984 Sarajevo	4 x 7.5 km relay

Ernst Reiter (born 31 October 1962 in Ruhpolding) is a former German biathlete who represented West Germany. At the 1984 Olympics in Sarajevo, Reiter won a bronze medal with the West German relay team consisting of Peter Angerer, Walter Pichler and Fritz Fischer. And at the 1988 Olympics in Calgary. Reiter won a silver medal with the West German relay team consisting of Peter Angerer, Stefan Höck and Fritz Fischer
