= Inga Kesper =

German biathlete (born 1968)

Personal information
- Nationality: German
- Born: 22 September 1968 (age 56); Willingen, West Germany

Sport
- Sport: Biathlon

Inga Kesper (born 22 September 1968) is a German former biathlete. She competed in two events at the 1992 Winter Olympics.
