= Anne Elvebakk =

Norwegian biathlete (born 1966)

Medal record

Women's biathlon

World Championships
Gold medal – first place	1988 Chamonix	10 km individual
Gold medal – first place	1989 Feistritz an der Drau	7.5 km sprint
Gold medal – first place	1990 Minsk	7.5 km sprint
Silver medal – second place	1988 Chamonix	3 × 5 km relay
Silver medal – second place	1989 Feistritz an der Drau	15 km individual
Silver medal – second place	1989 Feistritz an der Drau	Team event
Silver medal – second place	1990 Oslo	3 × 7.5 km relay
Silver medal – second place	1991 Lahti	3 × 7.5 km relay
Bronze medal – third place	1986 Falun	3 × 5 km relay
Bronze medal – third place	1987 Lahti	5 km sprint
Bronze medal – third place	1987 Lahti	3 × 5 km relay
Bronze medal – third place	1988 Chamonix	5 km sprint

Anne Elisabeth Elvebakk, married Linn (born 10 May 1966) is a former biathlete from Norway, born in Voss Municipality. She has received twelve World championship medals, among others the gold medals of the 10 km individual event in 1988, the 7.5 km sprint events in 1989 and 1990. In 1988 she won the overall Biathlon World Cup. She represented the club Voss SL.
