= 1988–89 Biathlon World Cup =

Biathlon competition

1988–89 World Cup
Discipline	Men	Women
Overall	(Norway) Eirik Kvalfoss	(Soviet Union) Elena Golovina
Nations Cup	East Germany	Soviet Union
Individual	(Soviet Union) Alexandr Popov	(Soviet Union) Elena Golovina
Sprint	(Norway) Eirik Kvalfoss	(Soviet Union) Elena Golovina

Competition

The 1988–89 Biathlon World Cup was a multi-race tournament over a season of biathlon, organised by the UIPMB (Union Internationale de Pentathlon Moderne et Biathlon). The season started on 15 December 1988 in Albertville, France, and ended on 19 March 1989 in Steinkjer Municipality, Norway. It was the 12th season of the Biathlon World Cup.

== Calendar ==
Below is the World Cup calendar for the 1988–89 season.

Location	Date	Individual	Sprint	Team event	Relay
(France) Albertville	15–18 December	●	●	●	
(People's Republic of Bulgaria) Borovets	19–22 January	●	●		●
(West Germany) Ruhpolding	26–29 January	●	●		●
(Austria) Feistritz	7–12 February	●	●	●	●
(Finland) Hämeenlinna	2–5 March	●	●	●	
(Sweden) Östersund	9–12 March	●	●		●
(Norway) Steinkjer	16–19 March	●	●	●	
Total		6	6	3	3

- 1989 World Championship races were not included in the 1988–89 World Cup scoring system.
- The relays were technically unofficial races as they did not count towards anything in the World Cup.

== World Cup Podium ==
=== Men ===
Stage	Date	Place	Discipline	Winner	Second	Third	Yellow bib (After competition)	Det.
1	15 December 1988	(France) Albertville	20 km Individual	(East Germany) Birk Anders	(Soviet Union) Alexandr Popov	(East Germany) Frank-Peter Roetsch	(East Germany) Birk Anders	
1	17 December 1988	(France) Albertville	10 km Sprint	(East Germany) Frank Luck	(Norway) Eirik Kvalfoss	(East Germany) Birk Anders	(East Germany) Birk Anders	
2	19 January 1989	(Bulgaria) Borovets	20 km Individual	(Czechoslovakia) Jan Matouš	(France) Thierry Gerbier	(Norway) Eirik Kvalfoss	(Norway) Eirik Kvalfoss	
2	21 January 1989	(Bulgaria) Borovets	10 km Sprint	(East Germany) Birk Anders	(West Germany) Ernst Reiter	(East Germany) Frank-Peter Roetsch	(Norway) Eirik Kvalfoss	
3	26 January 1989	(West Germany) Ruhpolding	20 km Individual	(Soviet Union) Sergei Bulygin	(Soviet Union) Alexandr Popov	(East Germany) Frank-Peter Roetsch	(East Germany) Frank-Peter Roetsch	
3	28 January 1989	(West Germany) Ruhpolding	10 km Sprint	(East Germany) Frank-Peter Roetsch	(Norway) Eirik Kvalfoss	(Soviet Union) Alexandr Popov	(East Germany) Frank-Peter Roetsch	
4	2 March 1989	(Finland) Hämeenlinna	20 km Individual	(Soviet Union) Alexandr Popov	(Norway) Eirik Kvalfoss	(Soviet Union) Sergei Tchepikov	(Norway) Eirik Kvalfoss	
4	4 March 1989	(Finland) Hämeenlinna	10 km Sprint	(Norway) Eirik Kvalfoss	(Soviet Union) Juri Kashkarov	(Soviet Union) Valeriy Medvedtsev	(Norway) Eirik Kvalfoss	
5	9 March 1989	(Sweden) Östersund	20 km Individual	(Soviet Union) Sergei Tchepikov	(Soviet Union) Valeriy Medvedtsev	(Soviet Union) Alexandr Popov	(Norway) Eirik Kvalfoss	
5	11 March 1989	(Sweden) Östersund	10 km Sprint	(Italy) Johann Passler	(Sweden) Lars Wiklund	(East Germany) André Sehmisch	(Norway) Eirik Kvalfoss	
6	16 March 1989	(Norway) Steinkjer	20 km Individual	(West Germany) Fritz Fischer	(Soviet Union) Alexandr Popov	(West Germany) Ernst Reiter	(Norway) Eirik Kvalfoss	
6	18 March 1989	(Norway) Steinkjer	10 km Sprint	(West Germany) Fritz Fischer	(Soviet Union) Sergei Tchepikov	(France) Thierry Gerbier	(Norway) Eirik Kvalfoss	

=== Women ===
Stage	Date	Place	Discipline	Winner	Second	Third	Yellow bib (After competition)	Det.
1	15 December 1988	(France) Les Saisies	15 km Individual	(Bulgaria) Mariya Manolova	(Norway) Anne Elvebakk	(West Germany) Petra Schaaf	(Bulgaria) Mariya Manolova	Detail
1	17 December 1988	(France) Les Saisies	7.5 km Sprint	(Bulgaria) Nadezhda Aleksieva	(Soviet Union) Natalia Prikazchikova	(Bulgaria) Tsvetana Krasteva	(Bulgaria) Mariya Manolova	Detail
2	19 January 1989	(Bulgaria) Borovets	15 km Individual	(Soviet Union) Natalia Ivanova	(Soviet Union) Elena Golovina	(Soviet Union) Luiza Tcherepanova	(Soviet Union) Elena Golovina	Detail
2	21 January 1989	(Bulgaria) Borovets	7.5 km Sprint	(Soviet Union) Elena Golovina	(Bulgaria) Tsvetana Krasteva	(Norway) Elin Kristiansen	(Soviet Union) Elena Golovina	Detail
3	26 January 1989	(West Germany) Ruhpolding	15 km Individual	(West Germany) Martina Stede	(Soviet Union) Natalia Prikazchikova	(Soviet Union) Elena Golovina	(Soviet Union) Elena Golovina	Detail
3	28 January 1989	(West Germany) Ruhpolding	7.5 km Sprint	(Soviet Union) Svetlana Davidova	(Soviet Union) Elena Golovina	(Bulgaria) Mariya Manolova	(Soviet Union) Elena Golovina	Detail
4	2 March 1989	(Finland) Hämeenlinna	15 km Individual	(Soviet Union) Elena Golovina	(Soviet Union) Svetlana Davidova	(Soviet Union) Natalia Prikazchikova	(Soviet Union) Elena Golovina	Detail
4	4 March 1989	(Finland) Hämeenlinna	7.5 km Sprint	(Soviet Union) Elena Golovina	(Soviet Union) Natalia Prikazchikova	(Finland) Seija Hyytiäinen	(Soviet Union) Elena Golovina	Detail
5	9 March 1989	(Sweden) Östersund	15 km Individual	(Bulgaria) Iva Shkodreva	(Bulgaria) Tsvetana Krasteva	(Soviet Union) Svetlana Davidova	(Soviet Union) Elena Golovina	Detail
5	11 March 1989	(Sweden) Östersund	7.5 km Sprint	(Soviet Union) Natalia Prikazchikova	(Norway) Anne Elvebakk	(Bulgaria) Tsvetana Krasteva	(Soviet Union) Elena Golovina	Detail
6	16 March 1989	(Norway) Steinkjer	15 km Individual	(West Germany) Martina Stede	(Norway) Mona Bollerud	(Norway) Elin Kristiansen	(Soviet Union) Elena Golovina	Detail
6	18 March 1989	(Norway) Steinkjer	7.5 km Sprint	(Norway) Anne Elvebakk	(Soviet Union) Svetlana Davidova	(Norway) Synnøve Thoresen	(Soviet Union) Elena Golovina	Detail

=== Men's team ===
Event	Date	Place	Discipline	Winner	Second	Third
1	18 December 1988	(France) Albertville	Team event	East Germany Birk Anders; André Sehmisch; Frank-Peter Roetsch; Frank Luck	Czechoslovakia Tomáš Kos; Martin Rypl; Jaroslav Pinc; Jan Matouš	France Christian Dumont; Thierry Gerbier; Francis Mougel; Hervé Flandin
2	22 January 1989	(Bulgaria) Borovets	4x7.5 km Relay	West Germany Ernst Reiter; Alois Reiter; Herbert Fritzenwenger; Fritz Fischer	East Germany Frank Luck; André Sehmisch; Birk Anders; Frank-Peter Roetsch	Czechoslovakia Tomáš Kos; Martin Rypl; Jan Matouš; Jiří Holubec
3	29 January 1989	(Germany) Ruhpolding	4x7.5 km Relay	East Germany Frank Luck; André Sehmisch; Frank-Peter Roetsch; Birk Anders	Soviet Union Dmitry Vasilyev; Sergei Tchepikov; Alexandr Popov; Valeriy Medvedtsev	West Germany Ernst Reiter; Franz Wudy; Herbert Fritzenwenger; Fritz Fischer
4	5 March 1989	(Finland) Hämeenlinna	Team event	Soviet Union Juri Kashkarov; Valeriy Medvedtsev; Sergei Tchepikov; Anatoly Zhdanovich	Sweden Karl-Gunnar Grenemark; Roger Westling; Lars Wiklund; Peter Sjoeden	France Francis Mougel; Lionel Laurent; Thierry Dusserre; Hervé Flandin
5	12 March 1989	(Sweden) Östersund	4x7.5 km Relay	Soviet Union Juri Kashkarov; Sergei Tchepikov; Alexandr Popov; Valeriy Medvedtsev	Norway Geir Einang; Frode Løberg; Gisle Fenne; Eirik Kvalfoss	East Germany Frank Luck; André Sehmisch; Raik Dittrich; Birk Anders
6	19 March 1989	(Norway) Steinkjer	Team event	Norway Frode Løberg; Geir Einang; Gisle Fenne; Eirik Kvalfoss	Italy Werner Kiem; Andreas Zingerle; Johann Passler; Gottlieb Taschler	Soviet Union Juri Kashkarov; Valeriy Medvedtsev; Alexandr Popov; Sergei Tchepikov

=== Women's team ===
Event	Date	Place	Discipline	Winner	Second	Third
2	22 January 1989	(Bulgaria) Borovets	3x6 km Relay	West Germany Martina Stede; Dorina Pieper; Petra Schaaf	Norway Synnøve Thoresen; Elin Kristiansen; Anne Elvebakk	Soviet Union Natalia Prikazchikova; Tatiana Sharamtchevskaia; Anna Kuzmina
3	29 January 1989	(Germany) Ruhpolding	3x6 km Relay	Soviet Union Natalia Prikazchikova; Svetlana Davidova; Elena Golovina	Finland Tuija Vuoksiala; Pirjo Mattila; Seija Hyytiäinen	Bulgaria Cvetana Krasteva; Nadezhda Aleksieva; Mariya Manolova
5	12 March 1989	(Sweden) Östersund	3x6 km Relay	Soviet Union Natalia Prikazchikova; Elena Golovina; Svetlana Davidova	Bulgaria Cvetana Krasteva; Iva Shkodreva; Nadezhda Aleksieva	Norway Synnøve Thoresen; Elin Kristiansen; Anne Elvebakk

== Standings: Men ==
=== Overall ===
Pos.		Points
1.	(Norway) Eirik Kvalfoss	195
2.	(Soviet Union) Alexandr Popov	184
3.	(Soviet Union) Sergei Tchepikov	164
4.	(East Germany) Birk Anders	157
5.	(Soviet Union) Valeriy Medvedtsev	149

- Final standings after 12 races.

=== Individual ===
Pos.		Points
1.	(Soviet Union) Alexandr Popov	108
2.	(Soviet Union) Sergei Tchepikov	96
3.	(Norway) Eirik Kvalfoss	92
4.	(West Germany) Fritz Fischer	80
5.	(East Germany) Birk Anders	78

- Final standings after 6 races.

=== Sprint ===
Pos.		Points
1.	(Norway) Eirik Kvalfoss	103
2.	(Soviet Union) Valeriy Medvedtsev	80
3.	(East Germany) Birk Anders	79
4.	(Soviet Union) Alexandr Popov	76
5.	(East Germany) André Sehmisch	75

- Final standings after 6 races.

=== Nation ===
Pos.		Points
1.	East Germany	5655
2.	Soviet Union	5543
3.	West Germany	5328
4.	Italy	5254
5.	Austria	5063

- Final standings after 15 races.

== Standings: Women ==
=== Overall ===
Pos.		Points
1.	(Soviet Union) Elena Golovina	210
2.	(Soviet Union) Natalia Prikazchikova	187
3.	(Soviet Union) Svetlana Davidova	185
4.	(Bulgaria) Cvetana Krasteva	176
5.	(Norway) Anne Elvebakk	165

- Final standings after 12 races.

=== Individual ===
Pos.		Points
1.	(Soviet Union) Elena Golovina	102
2.	(Soviet Union) Svetlana Davidova	92
3.	(Norway) Mona Bollerud	88
4.	(Norway) Elin Kristiansen	86
5.	(Bulgaria) Mariya Manolova	84

- Final standings after 6 races.

=== Sprint ===
Pos.		Points
1.	(Soviet Union) Elena Golovina	108
2.	(Soviet Union) Natalia Prikazchikova	104
3.	(Soviet Union) Svetlana Davidova	93
4.	(Bulgaria) Cvetana Krasteva	93
5.	(Norway) Anne Elvebakk	92

- Final standings after 6 races.

=== Nation ===
Pos.		Points
1.	Soviet Union	6004
2.	Bulgaria	5231
3.	Norway	5228
4.	Finland	4980
5.	West Germany	4761

- Final standings after 15 races.

== Medal table ==
Rank	Nation	Gold	Silver	Bronze	Total
1	Soviet Union	12	14	9	35
2	West Germany	6	1	3	10
3	East Germany	5	1	6	12
4	Bulgaria	3	3	4	10
5	Norway	2	8	5	15
6	Czechoslovakia	1	0	1	2
7	Italy	1	0	0	1
8	Finland	0	1	1	2
8	France	0	1	1	2
10	Sweden	0	1	0	1
Totals (10 entries)		30	30	30	90

== Achievements ==
=== Men ===
First World Cup career victory

- Birk Anders (GDR), 21, in his 3rd season — the WC 1 Individual in Albertville; it also was his first podium
- Frank Luck (GDR), 21, in his 3rd season — the WC 1 Sprint in Albertville; it also was his first podium
- Sergei Bulygin (URS), 25, in his 7th season — the WC 3 Individual in Ruhpolding; first podium was the 1984–85 Sprint in Antholz-Anterselva
- Sergei Tchepikov (URS), 22, in his 3rd season — the WC 5 Individual in Östersund; first podium was the 1988–89 Individual in Hämeenlinna

First World Cup podium

- Thierry Gerbier (FRA), 23, in his 4th season — no. 2 in the WC 2 Individual in Borovets
- Sergei Tchepikov (URS), 22, in his 3rd season — no. 3 in the WC 4 Individual in Hämeenlinna
- Lars Wiklund (SWE), in his 3rd season — no. 2 in the WC 5 Sprint in Östersund

Victory in this World Cup (all-time number of victories in parentheses)

- Fritz Fischer (FRG), 2 (7) first places
- Birk Anders (GDR), 2 (2) first places
- Frank-Peter Roetsch (GDR), 1 (10) first place
- Eirik Kvalfoss (NOR), 1 (10) first place
- Jan Matouš (TCH), 1 (2) first place
- Alexandr Popov (URS), 1 (2) first place
- Johann Passler (ITA), 1 (2) first place
- Frank Luck (GDR), 1 (1) first place
- Sergei Bulygin (URS), 1 (1) first place
- Sergei Tchepikov (URS), 1 (1) first place

=== Women ===
Victory in this World Cup (all-time number of victories in parentheses)

- Elena Golovina (URS), 3 (3) first places
- Martina Stede (GER), 2 (2) first places
- Mariya Manolova (BUL), 1 (1) first place
- Nadezhda Aleksieva (BUL), 1 (1) first place
- Natalia Ivanova (URS), 1 (1) first place
- Svetlana Davidova (URS), 1 (1) first place
- Iva Shkodreva (BUL), 1 (1) first place
- Natalia Prikazchikova (URS), 1 (1) first place
- Anne Elvebakk (NOR), 1 (1) first place

== Retirements ==
The following notable biathletes retired after the 1988–89 season:

- Juha Tella (FIN)
- Ernst Reiter (FRG)
- Herbert Fritzenwenger (FRG)
- Stefan Höck (FRG)
- Roger Westling (SWE)
- Sergei Bulygin (URS)
- Marie-Pierre Baby (FRA)
- Mona Bollerud (NOR)
- Natalia Prikazchikova (URS)
