= 1988–89 Biathlon World Cup – Overall Men =

For each event, a first place gives 30 points, a 2nd place 26 pts, a 3rd place 24 pts, a 4th place 22 pts, then linearly decreasing by one point down to the 25th place. Equal placings (ties) give an equal number of points. The sum of all WC points of the season, minus the two worst results in each of the two disciplines, gives the biathlete's total WC score.

== 1987–88 Top 3 Standings ==
| Medal | Athlete | Points |
|---|---|---|
| Gold: | (West Germany) Fritz Fischer | 171 |
| Silver: | (Norway) Eirik Kvalfoss | 167 |
| Bronze: | (Italy) Johann Passler | 160 |

== Standings ==
| # | Name | ALB IN | ALB SP | BOR IN | BOR SP | RUH IN | RUH SP | HAM IN | HAM SP | ÖST IN | ÖST SP | STE IN | STE SP | Total |
|---|---|---|---|---|---|---|---|---|---|---|---|---|---|---|
| 1. | Eirik Kvalfoss (NOR) | 20 | 26 | 24 | 21 | — | 26 | 26 | 30 | 22 | ~~18~~ | ~~0~~ | ~~19~~ | 195 |
| 2 | Alexandr Popov (URS) | 26 | 22 | — | — | 26 | 24 | 30 | ~~12~~ | ~~24~~ | 18 | 26 | 12 | 184 |
| 3 | Sergei Tchepikov (URS) | ~~0~~ | 4 | — | — | 21 | 20 | 24 | 18 | 30 | ~~0~~ | 21 | 26 | 164 |
| 4 | Birk Anders (GDR) | 30 | 24 | 12 | 30 | ~~5~~ | 10 | 20 | ~~0~~ | 16 | 15 | — | — | 157 |
| 5 | Valeriy Medvedtsev (URS) | 21 | 21 | — | — | 4 | 18 | ~~0~~ | 24 | 26 | ~~0~~ | 18 | 17 | 149 |
| 6 | Fritz Fischer (FRG) | ~~0~~ | 13 | 13 | — | 22 | 21 | — | — | 15 | 0 | 30 | 30 | 144 |
| 7 | Frank-Peter Roetsch (GDR) | 24 | 19 | 16 | 24 | 24 | 30 | — | — | — | — | — | — | 137 |
| 8 | Andreas Zingerle (ITA) | 19 | ~~11~~ | 14 | ~~0~~ | 12 | 13 | 22 | 19 | ~~7~~ | 11 | ~~11~~ | 20 | 130 |
| 9 | Frode Løberg (NOR) | 22 | 14 | 20 | 20 | — | ~~9~~ | 1 | ~~0~~ | ~~0~~ | 16 | 20 | 17 | 130 |
| 10 | Alfred Eder (AUT) | ~~13~~ | 16 | 19 | ~~0~~ | 14 | 8 | 16 | 20 | ~~0~~ | ~~0~~ | 15 | 14 | 122 |
| 11 | Frank Luck (GDR) | 17 | 30 | 17 | 11 | 11 | 12 | 15 | 8 | — | — | — | — | 121 |
| 12 | Gisle Fenne (NOR) | — | — | — | — | 0 | 12 | 21 | 17 | 21 | 12 | 19 | 18 | 120 |
| 13 | Ernst Reiter (FRG) | 11 | ~~0~~ | 22 | 26 | 2 | 17 | — | — | ~~0~~ | 0 | 24 | 11 | 113 |
| 14 | Juri Kashkarov (URS) | — | — | — | — | 0 | 22 | 17 | 26 | 14 | 22 | 8 | 0 | 109 |
| 15 | Johann Passler (ITA) | ~~0~~ | 2 | ~~0~~ | 6 | 0 | ~~0~~ | 14 | 22 | 17 | 30 | 17 | — | 108 |
| 16 | André Sehmisch (GDR) | 12 | 15 | 8 | 22 | ~~0~~ | ~~6~~ | 11 | 14 | 0 | 24 | — | — | 106 |
| 17 | Thierry Gerbier (FRA) | 2 | ~~0~~ | 26 | 0 | 9 | 3 | — | — | 20 | 0 | ~~0~~ | 24 | 84 |
| 18 | Anatoly Zhdanovich (URS) | — | — | — | — | — | — | 19 | 21 | 6 | 14 | 22 | 0 | 82 |
| 19 | Andreas Heymann (GDR) | ~~0~~ | 8 | 3 | ~~0~~ | 16 | 19 | 5 | 16 | 0 | 13 | — | — | 80 |
| 20 | Geir Einang (NOR) | 14 | 17 | ~~0~~ | 15 | — | — | 3 | 1 | 5 | 20 | 5 | ~~0~~ | 80 |
| 21 | Jan Matouš (TCH) | 18 | 10 | 30 | 17 | 0 | — | — | — | — | — | — | — | 75 |
| 22 | Franz Schuler (AUT) | — | — | ~~0~~ | 19 | 6 | 15 | 8 | ~~4~~ | 9 | 4 | 0 | 13 | 74 |
| 23 | Harri Eloranta (FIN) | 8 | 18 | — | — | 0 | 16 | — | — | 0 | 21 | — | — | 63 |
| 24 | Alois Reiter (FRG) | ~~0~~ | 20 | 0 | 18 | 17 | ~~0~~ | — | — | 0 | 1 | 0 | 0 | 56 |
| 25 | Raik Dittrich (GDR) | 5 | 9 | 4 | 5 | 20 | 5 | ~~0~~ | ~~0~~ | 1 | 6 | — | — | 55 |
| 26 | Peter Sjöden (SWE) | — | — | — | — | 10 | 4 | 13 | 9 | 0 | 8 | 1 | 9 | 54 |
| 27 | Stefan Höck (FRG) | — | ~~0~~ | — | ~~0~~ | 0 | 0 | 6 | 15 | 18 | 0 | 0 | 15 | 54 |
| 28 | Pieralberto Carrara (ITA) | — | — | ~~0~~ | ~~0~~ | 0 | 0 | 12 | 5 | 13 | 0 | 10 | 10 | 50 |
| 29 | Steffen Hoos (GDR) | ~~0~~ | ~~0~~ | 0 | 1 | 18 | 7 | 4 | 2 | 2 | 11 | — | — | 45 |
| 30 | Egon Leitner (AUT) | 16 | ~~0~~ | ~~0~~ | ~~0~~ | ~~0~~ | 0 | 0 | 0 | 0 | 3 | 3 | 21 | 43 |
| # | Name | ALB IN | ALB SP | BOR IN | BOR SP | RUH IN | RUH SP | HAM IN | HAM SP | ÖST IN | ÖST SP | STE IN | STE SP | Total |
