= Mike Dixon (biathlete) =

Scottish skier and biathlete

Personal information
- Full name: Michael Dixon
- Born: 21 November 1962 (age 63) Fort William, Scotland, United Kingdom
- Height: 1.68 m (5 ft 6 in)
- Website: []

Sport

Professional information
- Sport: Biathlon; Cross-country skiing
- Club: 35 Engineer Regiment Hameln
- World Cup debut: 18 December 1986
- Retired: 20 February 2002

Olympic Games
- Teams: 5 (1988, 1992, 1994, 1998, 2002); 1 (1984)
- Medals: 0

World Championships
- Teams: 14 (1987, 1989, 1990, 1991, 1992, 1993, 1994, 1995, 1996, 1997, 1998, 1999, 2000, 2001)
- Medals: 0

World Cup
- Seasons: 16 (1986/87–2001/02)
- All podiums: 0

Michael Dixon (born 21 November 1962), is a Scottish cross-country skier and biathlete. He has represented Great Britain at six Olympic Games in cross-country skiing and biathlon. He is only the seventh athlete from any country to have competed at six Winter Games and is one of fewer than fifty athletes to have competed in at least six Olympic Games.

He is a former Royal Engineer in the British Armed Forces, reaching the rank of Staff Sergeant, and currently a Nordic skiing and biathlon coach.

== Career ==
At the 1984 Winter Olympics in Sarajevo, he competed as a cross-country skier, coming 60th in the 15 km and 14th in the 4x10km relay. Shortly afterwards, he switched to the Biathlon for the rest of his career, competing in his first event at the Biathlon World Championships in 1987 at Lake Placid.

At the 1988 Winter Olympics in Calgary, he came 21st in the 10 km sprint, 13th in the 20 km, and 13th in the 4 x 7.5 km relay.

At the 1992 Winter Olympics in Albertville, he came 60th in the 10 km sprint, 12th in the 20 km, and 18th in the 4 x 7.5 km relay. In the 20km race, he was one of only three competitors (including gold medallist Yevgeniy Redkin) not to miss any targets.

At the 1994 Winter Olympics in Lillehammer, illness forced him into 54th place in the 20 km. His team came 17th in the 4 x 7.5 km relay. He was Britain's flag bearer at these Games, as he would be for the 1998 and 2002 Games as well.

At the 1998 Winter Olympics in Nagano, he came 47th in the 10 km sprint and 33rd in the 20 km.

At his final Olympics, the 2002 Games in Salt Lake City, he came 74th in the 10 km sprint, 79th in the 20 km, and 19th in the 4 x 7.5 km relay. He was given a surprise party at Soldier Hollow in honour of his sixth appearance by his teammates and the international biathlon community.

After retiring, he has been working as a commentator for Eurosport.

He led his team to victory in the BBC reality show Hercules Challenge in 2005.

== Personal life ==
He is affiliated with the 35 Engineer Regiment, Hameln and the Lochaber Athletic Club. He speaks English and German and enjoys photography, canoeing and mountain-marathons. He is married with four children and works with junior roller skiers and biathletes in Kingussie, Scotland. His son Scott was also a professional biathlete. He also works as a motivational speaker and fitness instructor.

== Biathlon results ==
All results are sourced from the International Biathlon Union.

=== Olympic Games ===
| Event | Individual | Sprint | Pursuit | Relay |
|---|---|---|---|---|
| (Canada) 1988 Calgary | 13th | 21st | —N/a | 13th |
| (France) 1992 Albertville | 12th | 60th | —N/a | 18th |
| (Norway) 1994 Lillehammer | 55th | — | —N/a | 17th |
| (Japan) 1998 Nagano | 33rd | 47th | —N/a | — |
| (United States) 2002 Salt Lake City | 79th | 74th | — | 19th |

*Pursuit was added as an event in 2002.

=== World Championships ===
| Event | Individual | Sprint | Pursuit | Mass start | Team | Relay |
|---|---|---|---|---|---|---|
| (United States) 1987 Lake Placid | 55th | 46th | —N/a | —N/a | —N/a | 13th |
| (Austria) 1989 Feistritz | 48th | 56th | —N/a | —N/a | — | 13th |
| (Soviet Union) 1990 Minsk | 12th | 62nd | —N/a | —N/a | — | — |
| (Finland) 1991 Lahti | 41st | 41st | —N/a | —N/a | 14th | 14th |
| (Russia) 1992 Novosibirsk | —N/a | —N/a | —N/a | —N/a | 9th | —N/a |
| (Bulgaria) 1993 Borovets | 88th | 85th | —N/a | —N/a | 20th | 21st |
| (Canada) 1994 Canmore | —N/a | —N/a | —N/a | —N/a | 10th | —N/a |
| (Italy) 1995 Antholz-Anterselva | 45th | — | —N/a | —N/a | 19th | 17th |
| (Germany) 1996 Ruhpolding | 48th | 52nd | —N/a | —N/a | 18th | 20th |
| (Slovakia) 1997 Brezno-Osrblie | 50th | — | — | —N/a | — | — |
| (Slovenia) 1998 Pokljuka | —N/a | —N/a | 42nd | —N/a | 14th | —N/a |
| (Finland) 1999 Kontiolahti | 36th | 80th | — | — | —N/a | 16th |
| (Norway) 2000 Oslo Holmenkollen | 55th | — | — | — | —N/a | 18th |
| (Slovenia) 2001 Pokljuka | 68th | 55th | 55th | — | —N/a | 19th |

*During Olympic seasons competitions are only held for those events not included in the Olympic program.
**The team event was added in 1989 and subsequently removed in 1998, pursuit having been added in 1997 with mass start being added in 1999.

== See also ==
- List of athletes with the most appearances at Olympic Games
