= Alfred Eder =

Austrian biathlete

Personal information
- Full name: Alfred Eder
- Born: 28 December 1953 (age 72) Piesendorf, Austria
- Height: 1.80 m (5 ft 11 in)

Sport

Professional information
- Sport: Biathlon
- Club: HSV Saalfelden
- World Cup debut: 13 January 1978

Olympic Games
- Teams: 6 (1976, 1980, 1984, 1988, 1992, 1994)
- Medals: 0

World Championships
- Teams: 17 (1976, 1977, 1978, 1979, 1981, 1982, 1983, 1985, 1986, 1987, 1989, 1990, 1991, 1992, 1993, 1994, 1995)
- Medals: 2 (0 gold)

World Cup
- Seasons: 18 (1977/78–1994/95)
- Individual victories: 1
- Individual podiums: 11
Medal record
Men's biathlon
Representing Austria
World Championships
Bronze medal – third place	1983 Antholz-Anterselva	10 km sprint
Bronze medal – third place	1986 Holmenkollen	20 km individual

Alfred Eder (born 28 December 1953) is an Austrian former biathlete.

== Life and career ==
Eder was born in Piesendorf, and has been a soldier and thus competed as a member of the Heeressportverein (army sports club) Saalfelden. He competed in six Winter Olympics, and jointly holds the Austrian record for most Winter Olympic appearances along with Mario Stecher and Markus Prock. He is the father of biathlete Simon Eder and was a coach of the Austrian biathlon team. He received a life ban from the Austrian Olympic Committee in 2007, as one of 14 team officials who were implicated in doping activity at the 2006 Winter Olympics. The bans on Eder and 11 others were subsequently rescinded in 2009, after the Fédération Internationale de Ski dropped doping charges against Eder, biathlon director for the Austrian ski federation Markus Gandler and cross-country ski coach Gerald Heigl.

Eder was appointed as Klaus Siebert's replacement as coach of the Belarusian biathlon squad ahead of the 2014–15 season.

== Biathlon results ==
All results are sourced from the International Biathlon Union.

=== Olympic Games ===
Event	Individual	Sprint	Relay
(Austria) 1976 Innsbruck	21st	—N/a	15th
(United States) 1980 Lake Placid	24th	23rd	6th
(Socialist Federal Republic of Yugoslavia) 1984 Sarajevo	34th	22nd	8th
(Canada) 1988 Calgary	26th	40th	4th
(France) 1992 Albertville	30th	53rd	—
(Norway) 1994 Lillehammer	10th	—	—

*Sprint was added as an event in 1980.

=== World Championships ===
2 medals (2 bronze)

Event	Individual	Sprint	Team	Relay
(Italy) 1976 Antholz-Anterselva	—N/a	29th	—N/a	—N/a
(Norway) 1977 Lillehammer	41st	35th	—N/a	—
(Austria) 1978 Hochfilzen	13th	11th	—N/a	5th
(West Germany) 1979 Ruhpolding	10th	8th	—N/a	6th
(Finland) 1981 Lahti	19th	14th	—N/a	10th
(Soviet Union) 1982 Minsk	22nd	—	—N/a	9th
(Italy) 1983 Antholz-Anterselva	12th	Bronze	—N/a	7th
(West Germany) 1985 Ruhpolding	21st	4th	—N/a	10th
(Norway) 1986 Oslo Holmenkollen	Bronze	10th	—N/a	7th
(United States) 1987 Lake Placid	29th	29th	—N/a	6th
(Austria) 1989 Feistritz	9th	20th	7th	9th
(Soviet Union) 1990 Minsk	27th	12th	5th	7th
(Finland) 1991 Lahti	18th	26th	9th	—
(Russia) 1992 Novosibirsk	—N/a	—N/a	5th	—N/a
(Bulgaria) 1993 Borovets	30th	—	4th	—
(Canada) 1994 Canmore	—N/a	—N/a	6th	—N/a
(Italy) 1995 Antholz-Anterselva	50th	—	—	—

*During Olympic seasons competitions are only held for those events not included in the Olympic program.
**Team was added as an event in 1989.

=== Individual victories ===
1 victory (1 Sp)

Season	Date	Location	Discipline	Level
1984–85; 1 victory (1 Sp)	26 January 1985	(Italy) Antholz-Anterselva	10 km sprint	Biathlon World Cup

*Results are from UIPMB and IBU races which include the Biathlon World Cup, Biathlon World Championships and the Winter Olympic Games.

== See also ==
- List of athletes with the most appearances at Olympic Games
