= 1988–89 Biathlon World Cup – Overall Women =

For each event, a first place gives 30 points, a 2nd place 26 pts, a 3rd place 24 pts, a 4th place 22 pts, then linearly decreasing by one point down to the 25th place. Equal placings (ties) give an equal number of points. The sum of all WC points of the season, minus the two worst results in each of the two disciplines, gives the biathlete's total WC score.

== Standings ==
#	Name	ALB IN	ALB SP	BOR IN	BOR SP	RUH IN	RUH SP	HAM IN	HAM SP	ÖST IN	ÖST SP	STE IN	STE SP	Total
1.	Elena Golovina (URS)	22	~~22~~	26	30	24	26	30	30	~~16~~	22	~~19~~	~~10~~	210
2	Natalia Prikazchikova (URS)	14	26	19	~~14~~	26	~~21~~	24	26	~~13~~	30	~~11~~	22	187
3	Svetlana Davidova (URS)	—	—	~~14~~	~~13~~	20	30	26	20	24	17	22	26	185
4	Cvetana Krasteva (BUL)	20	24	~~12~~	26	~~10~~	~~3~~	20	19	26	24	17	~~11~~	176
5	Anne Elvebakk (NOR)	26	18	~~15~~	~~15~~	—	—	17	18	15	26	15	30	165
6	Mona Bollerud (NOR)	19	16	~~11~~	~~2~~	—	—	21	22	22	18	26	15	159
7	Elin Kristiansen (NOR)	~~8~~	12	21	24	—	—	22	15	19	19	24	~~0~~	156
8	Nadezhda Aleksieva (BUL)	21	30	22	~~8~~	~~9~~	15	—	—	18	14	16	18	154
9	Mariya Manolova (BUL)	30	20	20	12	13	24	~~9~~	10	—	—	21	~~0~~	150
10	Martina Stede (FRG)	13	17	10	19	30	~~1~~	—	—	~~0~~	9	30	20	148
11	Synnøve Thoresen (NOR)	—	—	9	20	—	—	19	17	17	15	20	24	141
12	Iva Shkodreva (BUL)	9	14	2	~~3~~	~~0~~	11	—	—	30	21	14	21	122
13	Petra Schaaf (FRG)	24	19	18	21	19	18	—	—	—	—	—	—	119
14	Dorina Pieper (FRG)	7	15	~~6~~	17	16	~~5~~	—	—	14	20	12	13	114
15	Tuija Vuoksiala (FIN)	11	21	—	—	18	16	16	21	—	—	—	—	103
16	Inga Kesper (FRG)	6	~~7~~	~~3~~	10	~~5~~	~~4~~	18	16	12	13	9	17	101
17	Pirjo Mattila (FIN)	18	13	—	—	21	12	8	14	—	—	—	—	86
18	Irena Galabova (BUL)	17	8	16	9	8	0	—	—	11	16	—	—	85
19	Synnøve Bernsten (NOR)	—	—	—	—	22	19	—	—	—	—	18	16	75
20	Natalia Ivanova (URS)	—	—	30	22	0	22	—	—	—	—	—	—	74
21	Anna Kuzmina (URS)	16	2	17	18	—	14	—	—	—	—	—	—	67
22	Mia Stadig (SWE)	—	—	—	—	15	10	—	—	21	12	—	8	66
23	Inger Björkbom (SWE)	—	—	—	—	11	0	—	—	20	10	8	14	63
24	Hildegunn Fossen (NOR)	—	—	—	—	12	17	—	—	—	—	5	19	53
25	Luiza Tcherepanova (URS)	—	—	24	11	17	0	—	—	—	—	—	—	52
26	Seija Hyytiäinen (FIN)	—	—	—	—	0	6	15	24	—	—	—	—	45
27	Taina Murtomäki (FIN)	4	10	—	—	0	0	13	12	—	—	—	—	39
28	Sabiene Karlsson (SWE)	—	—	—	—	0	0	—	—	10	6	10	12	38
29	Sari Kokko (FIN)	—	—	—	—	2	7	15	9	—	—	—	—	33
30	Kerryn Pethybridge (AUS)	—	—	7	—	7	13	—	—	—	—	—	—	27
#	Name	ALB IN	ALB SP	BOR IN	BOR SP	RUH IN	RUH SP	HAM IN	HAM SP	ÖST IN	ÖST SP	STE IN	STE SP	Total
