= Pieralberto Carrara =

Italian biathlete (born 1966)

Personal information
- Full name: Pieralberto Carrara
- Born: 14 February 1966 (age 60) Bergamo, Italy
- Height: 1.72 m (5 ft 8 in)

Sport

Professional information
- Sport: Biathlon
- Club: CS Forestale
- World Cup debut: 17 January 1985

Olympic Games
- Teams: 4 (1988, 1992, 1994, 1998)
- Medals: 1 (0 gold)

World Championships
- Teams: 10 (1987, 1990, 1991, 1993, 1994, 1995, 1996, 1997, 1998, 1999)
- Medals: 5 (3 gold)

World Cup
- Seasons: 16 (1984/85–1999/2000)
- Individual victories: 2
- Individual podiums: 8
Medal record
Men's biathlon
Representing Italy
Olympic Games
Silver medal – second place	1998 Nagano	20 km individual
World Championships
Gold medal – first place	1990 Kontiolahti	4 × 7.5 km relay
Gold medal – first place	1993 Borovets	4 × 7.5 km relay
Gold medal – first place	1994 Canmore	Team event
Bronze medal – third place	1996 Ruhpolding	Team event
Bronze medal – third place	1997 Brezno-Osrblie	4 × 7.5 km relay

Pieralberto Carrara (born 14 February 1966) is a former Italian biathlete. He grew up in Serina. At the 1998 Olympics he won a silver in the 20 km individual. In the 1992–93 season he ended in third in the overall World Cup standings behind Mikael Löfgren and Mark Kirchner.

== Biathlon results ==
All results are sourced from the International Biathlon Union.

=== Olympic Games ===
Event	Individual	Sprint	Relay
(Canada) 1988 Calgary	—	13th	—
(France) 1992 Albertville	—	41st	4th
(Norway) 1994 Lillehammer	15th	23rd	6th
(Japan) 1998 Nagano	Silver	10th	9th

=== World Championships ===
Event	Individual	Sprint	Pursuit	Mass start	Team	Relay
(United States) 1987 Lake Placid	—	42nd	—N/a	—N/a	—N/a	—
(Soviet Union) 1990 Minsk	—	14th	—N/a	—N/a	—	Gold
(Finland) 1991 Lahti	59th	14th	—N/a	—N/a	—	4th
(Bulgaria) 1993 Borovets	—	6th	—N/a	—N/a	8th	Gold
(Canada) 1994 Canmore	—N/a	—N/a	—N/a	—N/a	Gold	—N/a
(Italy) 1995 Antholz-Anterselva	43rd	9th	—N/a	—N/a	—	4th
(Germany) 1996 Ruhpolding	18th	4th	—N/a	—N/a	Bronze	10th
(Slovakia) 1997 Brezno-Osrblie	38th	—	—	—N/a	10th	Bronze
(Slovenia) 1998 Pokljuka	—N/a	—N/a	19th	—N/a	6th	—N/a
(Finland) 1999 Kontiolahti	—	34th	44th	—	—N/a	8th

*During Olympic seasons competitions are only held for those events not included in the Olympic program.
**The team event was added in 1989 and subsequently removed in 1998, pursuit having been added in 1997 with mass start being added in 1999.

=== Individual victories ===
2 victories (1 In, 1 Sp)

Season	Date	Location	Discipline	Level
1990–91; 1 victory (1 In)	17 January 1991	(Germany) Ruhpolding	20 km individual	Biathlon World Cup
1992–93; 1 victory (1 Sp)	23 January 1993	(Italy) Antholz-Anterselva	10 km sprint	Biathlon World Cup

*Results are from UIPMB and IBU races which include the Biathlon World Cup, Biathlon World Championships and the Winter Olympic Games.

Further notable results

- 1990: 3rd, Italian championships of biathlon
- 1991: 3rd, Italian championships of biathlon, sprint
- 1992: 3rd, Italian championships of biathlon, sprint
- 1994:
  - 2nd, Italian championships of biathlon
  - 3rd, Italian championships of biathlon, sprint
- 1995: 1st, Italian championships of biathlon
- 1996:
  - 1st, Italian championships of biathlon
  - 1st, Italian championships of biathlon, sprint
- 1997: 2nd, Italian championships of biathlon, sprint
- 1999: 2nd, Italian championships of biathlon, pursuit
