= 1984–85 Biathlon World Cup =

Biathlon competition

1984–85 World Cup
Discipline	Men	Women
Overall	(East Germany) Frank-Peter Roetsch	

Competition

The 1984–85 Biathlon World Cup was a multi-race tournament over a season of biathlon, organised by the UIPMB (Union Internationale de Pentathlon Moderne et Biathlon). The season started on 10 January 1985 in Minsk, Soviet Union, and ended on 9 March 1985 in Holmenkollen, Norway. It was the eighth season of the Biathlon World Cup.

In Oberhof, the skating style of skiing made its introduction to biathlon. It was somewhat of a revolution as the skating style is quite a lot faster than the classic style. Some athletes did not adapt as quickly to the new style, and some nations, including West Germany and Norway, petitioned for a ban of the skating style.

There was originally going to be held a relay in Holmenkollen, but the relay had to be cancelled due to fog.

== New scoring system ==
The World Cup scoring system was changed before this season.

Points allocation from 1984–85 to 1999–2000
Place	1	2	3	4	5	6	7	8	9	10	11	12	13	14	15	16	17	18	19	20	21	22	23	24	25
Points	30	26	24	22	21	20	19	18	17	16	15	14	13	12	11	10	9	8	7	6	5	4	3	2	1

== Calendar ==
Below is the World Cup calendar for the 1984–85 season.

Location	Date	Individual	Sprint	Relay
(Soviet Union) Minsk	10–13 January	●	●	●
(East Germany) Oberhof	17–20 January	●	●	●
(Italy) Antholz-Anterselva	24–27 January	●	●	●
(West Germany) Ruhpolding	14–17 February	●	●	●
(Finland) Lahti	1–3 March	●	●	
(Norway) Holmenkollen	7–9 March	●	●	
Total		6	6	4

- 1985 World Championship races were not included in the 1984–85 World Cup scoring system.

*The relays were technically unofficial races as they did not count towards anything in the World Cup.

== Women's calendar ==
Location	Date	Individual	Sprint	Relay
(Soviet Union) Minsk	9–13 January	●	●	●
(Italy) Antholz-Anterselva	26–28 January	●	●	●
(Switzerland) Egg am Etzel	21–24 February	●	●	●
(Finland) Lahti	1–3 March	●	●	●
Total		4	4	4

*The relays were technically unofficial races as they did not count towards anything in the World Cup.

== World Cup Podium ==
=== Men ===
Stage	Date	Place	Discipline	Winner	Second	Third	Yellow bib (After competition)	Det.
1	10 January 1985	(Soviet Union) Minsk	20 km Individual	(Soviet Union) Andrei Zenkov	(Soviet Union) Juri Kashkarov	(Soviet Union) Piotr Miloradov	(Soviet Union) Andrei Zenkov	
1	12 January 1985	(Soviet Union) Minsk	10 km Sprint	(Soviet Union) Juri Kashkarov	(Soviet Union) Algimantas Shalna	(Norway) Kjell Søbak	(Soviet Union) Juri Kashkarov	
2	17 January 1985	(East Germany) Oberhof	20 km Individual	(West Germany) Peter Angerer	(East Germany) Frank-Peter Roetsch	(Soviet Union) Andrei Zenkov	(Soviet Union) Juri Kashkarov	
2	19 January 1985	(East Germany) Oberhof	10 km Sprint	(East Germany) Frank-Peter Roetsch	(Austria) Alfred Eder	(East Germany) Matthias Jacob	(Soviet Union) Juri Kashkarov	
3	24 January 1985	(Italy) Antholz-Anterselva	20 km Individual	(East Germany) Frank-Peter Roetsch	(Austria) Alfred Eder	(West Germany) Herbert Fritzenwenger	(East Germany) Frank-Peter Roetsch	
3	26 January 1985	(Italy) Antholz-Anterselva	10 km Sprint	(Austria) Alfred Eder	(West Germany) Peter Angerer	(Soviet Union) Sergei Bulygin	(East Germany) Frank-Peter Roetsch	
4	1 March 1985	(Finland) Lahti	20 km Individual	(Soviet Union) Sergei Antonov	(East Germany) Frank-Peter Roetsch	(Finland) Juha Tella	(East Germany) Frank-Peter Roetsch	
4	3 March 1985	(Finland) Lahti	10 km Sprint	(East Germany) Frank-Peter Roetsch	(Soviet Union) Juri Kashkarov	(East Germany) André Sehmisch	(East Germany) Frank-Peter Roetsch	
5	7 March 1985	(Norway) Oslo Holmenkollen	20 km Individual	(West Germany) Peter Angerer	(East Germany) André Sehmisch	(East Germany) Frank-Peter Roetsch	(East Germany) Frank-Peter Roetsch	
5	9 March 1985	(Norway) Oslo Holmenkollen	10 km Sprint	(East Germany) Frank-Peter Roetsch	(Soviet Union) Sergei Antonov	(Austria) Alfred Eder	(East Germany) Frank-Peter Roetsch	

=== Women ===
Stage	Date	Place	Discipline	Winner	Second	Third	Yellow bib (After competition)	Det.
1	9 January 1985	(Soviet Union) Minsk	10 km Individual	(Soviet Union) Elena Golovina	(Soviet Union) Kaija Parve	(Soviet Union) Tatiana Brylina	(Soviet Union) Elena Golovina	Detail
1	11 January 1985	(Soviet Union) Minsk	5 km Sprint	(Soviet Union) Elena Golovina	(Soviet Union) Tatiana Brylina	(Soviet Union) Kaija Parve	(Soviet Union) Elena Golovina	Detail
2	26 January 1985	(Italy) Antholz-Anterselva	10 km Individual	(United States) Pam Nordheim	(Bulgaria) Valentina Mikhailova	(United States) Pam Weiss	(Soviet Union) Elena Golovina	Detail
2	28 January 1985	(Italy) Antholz-Anterselva	5 km Sprint	(Sweden) Eva Korpela	(Norway) Sanna Grønlid	(Bulgaria) Tsvetana Krasteva	(Sweden) Eva Korpela	Detail
WC	21 February 1985	(Switzerland) Egg am Etzel	10 km Individual	(Soviet Union) Kaija Parve	(Norway) Sanna Grønlid	(Sweden) Eva Korpela	(Sweden) Eva Korpela	Detail
WC	24 February 1985	(Switzerland) Egg am Etzel	5 km Sprint	(Norway) Sanna Grønlid	(Soviet Union) Kaija Parve	(Soviet Union) Venera Chernyshova	(Norway) Sanna Grønlid	Detail
3	1 March 1985	(Finland) Lahti	10 km Individual	(Norway) Sanna Grønlid	(Norway) Siv Bråten	(Sweden) Eva Korpela	(Norway) Sanna Grønlid	Detail
3	3 March 1985	(Finland) Lahti	5 km Sprint	(Norway) Siv Bråten	(Sweden) Eva Korpela	(Finland) Tuula Ylinen	(Norway) Sanna Grønlid	Detail

== Standings: Men ==
=== Overall ===
Pos.		Points
1.	(East Germany) Frank-Peter Roetsch	172
2.	(Soviet Union) Juri Kashkarov	141
3.	(West Germany) Peter Angerer	140
4.	(Austria) Alfred Eder	138
5.	(Soviet Union) Andrei Zenkov	130

- Final standings after 10 races.

== Standings: Women ==
=== Overall ===
Pos.		Points
1.	(Norway) Sanna Grønlid	110
2.	(Sweden) Eva Korpela	106
3.	(Soviet Union) Kaija Parve	104
4.	(Soviet Union) Elena Golovina	100
5.	(Norway) Siv Bråten	94

- Final standings after 8 races.

== Achievements ==
First World/European Cup career victory

- Elena Golovina (URS), 23, in her 1st season — the EC 1 Individual in Minsk; it also was her first podium
- Andrei Zenkov (URS), in his 2nd season — the WC 1 Individual in Minsk; it also was his first podium
- Pam Nordheim (USA), in her 1st season — the EC 2 Individual in Antholz-Anterselva; it also was her first podium
- Alfred Eder (AUT), 31, in his 8th season — the WC 3 Sprint in Antholz-Anterselva; first podium was 1979–80 Individual in Antholz-Anterselva
- Sergei Antonov (URS), in his 2nd season — the WC 4 Individual in Lahti; it also was his first podium
- Siv Bråten (NOR), in her 3rd season — the EC 3 Sprint in Lahti; first podium was 1982–83 Sprint in Lappeenranta

First World/European Cup podium

- Kaija Parve (URS), 20, in her 1st season — no. 2 in the EC 1 Individual in Minsk
- Tatiana Brylina (URS), in her 1st season — no. 3 in the EC 1 Individual in Minsk
- Herbert Fritzenwenger (FRG), 22, in his 3rd season — no. 3 in the WC 3 Individual in Antholz-Anterselva
- Valentina Mikhailova (BUL), in her 1st season — no. 2 in the EC 2 Individual in Antholz-Anterselva
- Pam Weiss (USA), in her 1st season — no. 3 in the EC 2 Individual in Antholz-Anterselva
- Sergei Bulygin (URS), 21, in his 3rd season — no. 3 in the WC 3 Sprint in Antholz-Anterselva
- Juha Tella (FIN), 24, in his 2nd season — no. 3 in the WC 4 Individual in Lahti
- André Sehmisch (GDR), 20, in his 2nd season — no. 3 in the WC 4 Sprint in Lahti

Victory in this World/European Cup (all-time number of victories in parentheses)

- Frank-Peter Roetsch (GDR), 4 (6) first places
- Peter Angerer (FRG), 2 (6) first places
- Elena Golovina (URS), 2 (2) first place
- Juri Kashkarov (URS), 1 (2) first place
- Sanna Grønlid (NOR), 1 (2) first place
- Andrei Zenkov (URS), 1 (1) first place
- Pam Nordheim (USA), 1 (1) first place
- Alfred Eder (AUT), 1 (1) first place
- Sergei Antonov (URS), 1 (1) first place
- Siv Bråten (NOR), 1 (1) first place

== Retirements ==
Following notable biathletes retired after the 1984–85 season:

- Kjell Sobak (NOR)
- Rolf Storsveen (NOR)
- Algimantas Šalna (URS)
- Vladimir Alikin (URS)
- Gry Østvik (NOR)

== Notes ==
1. ^{1} The Aftenposten source gives a bit different scores and places France 3rd, Norway 4th, Italy 5th and Austria 7th. The Sports Book has been given precedent as that also shows whence the scores came.
2. ^{2} This was an unofficial version of the Nation Cup that ultimately would be implemented in the 1986–87 season, though in this version only the individual races counted.
3. ^{3} The Lahti Ski Museum has omitted Meloche from the list of results for some reason, but Aftenposten and the Sports Book includes her.
