= Andreas Zingerle =

Italian biathlete

Personal information
- Full name: Andreas Zingerle
- Born: 25 November 1961 (age 64) Anterselva-Antholz, Italy
- Height: 1.69 m (5 ft 7 in)

Sport

Professional information
- Sport: Biathlon
- Club: C.S. Carabinieri

Olympic Games
- Teams: 4 (1984, 1988, 1992, 1994)
- Medals: 1 (0 gold)

World Championships
- Teams: 12 (1982, 1983, 1985, 1986, 1987, 1989, 1990, 1991, 1992, 1993, 1994, 1995)
- Medals: 5 (4 gold)

World Cup
- Seasons: 14 (1981/82–1994/95)
- Individual victories: 4
- Individual podiums: 14
Medal record
Men's biathlon
Representing Italy
Olympic Games
Bronze medal – third place	1988 Calgary	4 × 7.5 km relay
World Championships
Gold medal – first place	1990 Kontiolahti	4 × 7.5 km relay
Gold medal – first place	1993 Borovets	20 km individual
Gold medal – first place	1993 Borovets	4 × 7.5 km relay
Gold medal – first place	1994 Canmore	Team event
Bronze medal – third place	1986 Oslo	4 × 7.5 km relay

Andreas Zingerle (Italian pronunciation: [anˈdrɛːaz dzinˈdʒɛrle]; born 25 November 1961) is an Italian former biathlete. At the 1988 Olympics in Calgary, Zingerle won a bronze medal in the relay. At the World Championships Zingerle accumulated one individual gold medal and three golds and a bronze in relay and team events.

He has later become the head coach of Italian National Team. Under his tenure the Italians collected several medals at the Olympic Winter Games and World Championships, including Gold Medals by Dominik Windisch and Dorothea Wierer at the Biathlon World Championships 2019. Wierer also won the 2018-19 Women's Overall World Cup.

== Biathlon results ==
All results are sourced from the International Biathlon Union.

=== Olympic Games ===
1 medal (1 bronze)

Event	Individual	Sprint	Relay
(Socialist Federal Republic of Yugoslavia) 1984 Sarajevo	9th	29th	5th
(Canada) 1988 Calgary	DSQ	15th	Bronze
(France) 1992 Albertville	17th	7th	4th
(Norway) 1994 Lillehammer	6th	44th	6th

=== World Championships ===
5 medals (4 gold, 1 bronze)

Event	Individual	Sprint	Team	Relay
(Soviet Union) 1982 Minsk	—	12th	—N/a	—
(Italy) 1983 Antholz-Anterselva	9th	22nd	—N/a	10th
(West Germany) 1985 Ruhpolding	27th	9th	—N/a	8th
(Norway) 1986 Oslo Holmenkollen	9th	13th	—N/a	Bronze
(United States) 1987 Lake Placid	11th	14th	—N/a	8th
(Austria) 1989 Feistritz	5th	10th	—	4th
(Soviet Union) 1990 Minsk	5th	7th	9th	Gold
(Finland) 1991 Lahti	8th	4th	—	4th
(Russia) 1992 Novosibirsk	—N/a	—N/a	8th	—N/a
(Bulgaria) 1993 Borovets	Gold	10th	—	Gold
(Canada) 1994 Canmore	—N/a	—N/a	Gold	—N/a
(Italy) 1995 Antholz-Anterselva	64th	—	—	—

*During Olympic seasons competitions are only held for those events not included in the Olympic program.
**Team was added as an event in 1989.

=== Individual victories ===
4 victories (3 In, 1 Sp)

Season	Date	Location	Discipline	Level
1989–90; 1 victory (1 Sp)	17 March 1990	(Finland) Kontiolahti	10 km sprint	Biathlon World Cup
1991–92; 1 victory (1 In)	19 January 1992	(Germany) Ruhpolding	20 km individual	Biathlon World Cup
1992–93; 2 victories (2 In)	14 January 1993	(Italy) Ridnaun-Val Ridanna	20 km individual	Biathlon World Cup
1992–93; 2 victories (2 In)	11 February 1993	(Bulgaria) Borovets	20 km individual	Biathlon World Championships

*Results are from UIPMB and IBU races which include the Biathlon World Cup, Biathlon World Championships and the Winter Olympic Games.

Further notable results

- 1980: 3rd, Italian championships of biathlon, sprint
- 1982: 1st, Italian championships of biathlon, sprint
- 1983: 2nd, Italian championships of biathlon
- 1986:
  - 1st, Italian championships of biathlon
  - 2nd, Italian championships of biathlon, sprint
- 1987:
  - 1st, Italian championships of biathlon
  - 1st, Italian championships of biathlon, sprint
- 1988:
  - 1st, Italian championships of biathlon
  - 3rd, Italian championships of biathlon, sprint
- 1990:
  - 1st, Italian championships of biathlon, sprint
  - 2nd, Italian championships of biathlon
- 1991: 1st, Italian championships of biathlon
- 1992:
  - 1st, Italian championships of biathlon
  - 2nd, Italian championships of biathlon, sprint
- 1995: 1st, Italian championships of biathlon, sprint
