= Gisle Fenne =

Norwegian biathlete (born 1963)

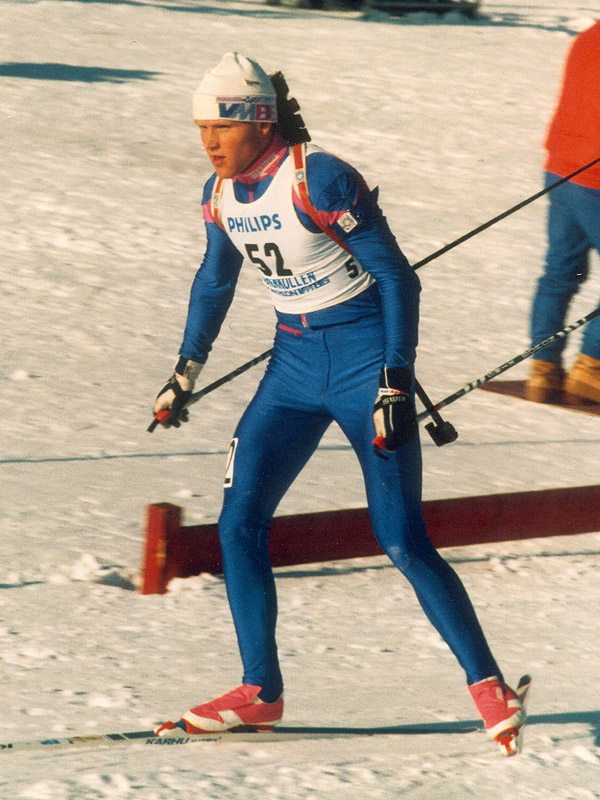
- Fenne at the 1986 World Championships.

Personal information
- Full name: Gisle Oddvar Fenne
- Born: 9 June 1963 (age 63) Voss Municipality, Hordaland, Norway
- Height: 1.81 m (5 ft 11 in)

Sport

Professional information
- Sport: Biathlon
- Club: Voss Skiskyttarlag
- World Cup debut: 21 January 1984

Olympic Games
- Teams: 2 (1988, 1992)
- Medals: 0

World Championships
- Teams: 7 (1985, 1986, 1987, 1989, 1990, 1991, 1992)
- Medals: 4 (0 gold)

World Cup
- Seasons: 11 (1983/84–1993/94)
- Individual victories: 1
- Individual podiums: 2
Medal record
Men's biathlon
Representing Norway
World Championships
Silver medal – second place	1989 Feistritz	10 km sprint
Silver medal – second place	1992 Novosibirsk	Team event
Bronze medal – third place	1989 Feistritz	4 × 7.5 km relay
Bronze medal – third place	1991 Lahti	4 × 7.5 km relay

Gisle Oddvar Fenne (born 9 June 1963) is a former Norwegian biathlete. His best-known international achievement was the silver medal in the 20 km individual in the World Championships 1989 in Feistritz an der Drau. He succeeded in many duels with teammate Eirik Kvalfoss. He was among the top Norwegian biathletes from the mid-1980s until the mid-1990s, and became twice the Norwegian champion in the 20 km individual. He is the father of biathlete Hilde Fenne.

== Biathlon results ==
All results are sourced from the International Biathlon Union.

=== Olympic Games ===
Event	Individual	Sprint	Relay
(Canada) 1988 Calgary	30th	—	6th
(France) 1992 Albertville	9th	—	5th

=== World Championships ===
4 medals (2 silver, 2 bronze)

Event	Individual	Sprint	Team	Relay
(West Germany) 1985 Ruhpolding	—	18th	—N/a	4th
(Norway) 1986 Oslo Holmenkollen	10th	27th	—N/a	5th
(United States) 1987 Lake Placid	45th	21st	—N/a	4th
(Austria) 1989 Feistritz	Silver	—	—	Bronze
(Soviet Union) 1990 Minsk	7th	30th	6th	4th
(Finland) 1991 Lahti	17th	11th	—	Bronze
(Russia) 1992 Novosibirsk	—N/a	—N/a	Silver	—N/a

*During Olympic seasons competitions are only held for those events not included in the Olympic program.
**Team was added as an event in 1989.

=== Individual victories ===
1 victory (1 In)

Season	Date	Location	Discipline	Level
1987–88; 1 victory (1 In)	10 March 1988	(Norway) Oslo Holmenkollen	20 km individual	Biathlon World Cup

*Results are from UIPMB and IBU races which include the Biathlon World Cup, Biathlon World Championships and the Winter Olympic Games.
