= Jan Matouš =

Czech biathlete

Personal information
- Born: 30 May 1961 (age 65) Vrchlabí, Czechoslovakia
- Height: 1.78 m (5 ft 10 in)

Sport

Professional information
- Sport: Biathlon
- Club: ŠKP Jablonec Rudá Hvezda

Olympic Games
- Teams: 2 (1984, 1988)
- Medals: 0

World Championships
- Teams: 7 (1983, 1985, 1986, 1987, 1989, 1990, 1991)
- Medals: 2 (0 gold)

World Cup
- Seasons: 9 (1982/83–1990/91)
- Individual victories: 2
- Individual podiums: 5
Medal record
Men's biathlon
Representing Czechoslovakia
World Championships
Silver medal – second place	1990 Oslo	Team event
Bronze medal – third place	1987 Lake Placid	20 km individual

Jan Matouš (born 30 May 1961) is a Czech former biathlete who competed for Czechoslovakia. At the 1987 World Championships in Lake Placid, New York. Matouš won a bronze medal in the 20 km individual. He also won a silver medal in the team competition at the 1990 World Championships in Minsk. Matouš's best Olympic placing was a 9th place in the sprint event at the 1984 Olympics in Sarajevo.

== Biathlon results ==
All results are sourced from the International Biathlon Union.

=== Olympic Games ===
Event	Individual	Sprint	Relay
(Socialist Federal Republic of Yugoslavia) 1984 Sarajevo	10th	9th	6th
(Canada) 1988 Calgary	14th	16th	11th

=== World Championships ===
2 medals (1 silver, 1 bronze)

Event	Individual	Sprint	Team	Relay
(Italy) 1983 Antholz-Anterselva	43rd	23rd	—N/a	6th
(West Germany) 1985 Ruhpolding	17th	26th	—N/a	6th
(Norway) 1986 Oslo Holmenkollen	13th	5th	—N/a	6th
(United States) 1987 Lake Placid	Bronze	13th	—N/a	9th
(Austria) 1989 Feistritz	—	49th	14th	7th
(Soviet Union) 1990 Minsk	14th	—	Silver	—
(Finland) 1991 Lahti	—	—	5th	10th

*During Olympic seasons competitions are only held for those events not included in the Olympic program.
**Team was added as an event in 1989.

=== Individual victories ===
2 victories (2 In)

Season	Date	Location	Discipline	Level
1986–87; 1 victory (1 In)	8 January 1987	(People's Republic of Bulgaria) Borovets	20 km individual	Biathlon World Cup
1988–89; 1 victory (1 In)	19 January 1989	(People's Republic of Bulgaria) Borovets	20 km individual	Biathlon World Cup

*Results are from UIPMB and IBU races which include the Biathlon World Cup, Biathlon World Championships and the Winter Olympic Games.
