= Johann Passler =

Italian biathlete

Personal information
- Born: 18 August 1961 (age 64) Antholz-Anterselva, Italy
- Height: 1.78 m (5 ft 10 in)

Sport

Professional information
- Sport: Biathlon
- Club: C.S. Carabinieri

Olympic Games
- Teams: 4 (1984, 1988, 1992, 1994)
- Medals: 2 (0 gold)

World Championships
- Teams: 10 (1982, 1983, 1985, 1986, 1987, 1989, 1990, 1991, 1992, 1993)
- Medals: 4 (2 gold)

World Cup
- Seasons: 15 (1981/82–1995/96)
- Individual victories: 3
- Individual podiums: 10
Medal record
Men's biathlon
Representing Italy
Olympic Games
Bronze medal – third place	1988 Calgary	20 km individual
Bronze medal – third place	1988 Calgary	4 × 7.5 km relay
World Championships
Gold medal – first place	1990 Kontiolahti	4 × 7.5 km relay
Gold medal – first place	1993 Borovets	4 × 7.5 km relay
Bronze medal – third place	1985 Ruhpolding	10 km sprint
Bronze medal – third place	1986 Oslo Holmenkollen	4 × 7.5 km relay

Johann Passler (born 18 August 1961) is a former Italian biathlete. At the 1988 Olympics in Calgary, Passler won bronze medals in the 20 km and in the relay. At the World Championships, Passler won two gold medals and two bronze.

== Biathlon results ==
All results are sourced from the International Biathlon Union.

=== Olympic Games ===
2 medals (2 bronze)

Event	Individual	Sprint	Relay
(Socialist Federal Republic of Yugoslavia) 1984 Sarajevo	—	35th	5th
(Canada) 1988 Calgary	Bronze	8th	Bronze
(France) 1992 Albertville	7th	15th	4th
(Norway) 1994 Lillehammer	—	13th	6th

=== World Championships ===
4 medals (2 gold, 2 bronze)

Event	Individual	Sprint	Team	Relay
(Soviet Union) 1982 Minsk	27th	20th	—N/a	5th
(Italy) 1983 Antholz-Anterselva	11th	6th	—N/a	10th
(West Germany) 1985 Ruhpolding	—	Bronze	—N/a	8th
(Norway) 1986 Oslo Holmenkollen	7th	4th	—N/a	Bronze
(United States) 1987 Lake Placid	19th	31st	—N/a	8th
(Austria) 1989 Feistritz	12th	4th	—	4th
(Soviet Union) 1990 Minsk	—	10th	9th	Gold
(Finland) 1991 Lahti	—	22nd	—	4th
(Russia) 1992 Novosibirsk	—N/a	—N/a	8th	—N/a
(Bulgaria) 1993 Borovets	17th	11th	—	Gold

*During Olympic seasons competitions are only held for those events not included in the Olympic program.
**Team was added as an event in 1989.

=== Individual victories ===
3 victories (1 In, 2 Sp)

Season	Date	Location	Discipline	Level
1987–88; 1 victory (1 In)	23 January 1988	(Italy) Antholz-Anterselva	20 km individual	Biathlon World Cup
1988–89; 1 victory (1 Sp)	11 March 1989	(Sweden) Östersund	10 km sprint	Biathlon World Cup
1992–93; 1 victory (1 Sp)	16 January 1993	(Italy) Ridnaun-Val Ridanna	10 km sprint	Biathlon World Cup

*Results are from UIPMB and IBU races which include the Biathlon World Cup, Biathlon World Championships and the Winter Olympic Games.

Further notable results

- 1982: 2nd, Italian championships of biathlon
- 1983:
  - 1st, Italian championships of biathlon
  - 1st, Italian championships of biathlon, sprint
- 1986: 3rd, Italian championships of biathlon, sprint
- 1988:
  - 1st, Italian championships of biathlon, sprint
  - 2nd, Italian championships of biathlon
- 1990:
  - 1st, Italian championships of biathlon
  - 3rd, Italian championships of biathlon, sprint
- 1991:
  - 2nd, Italian championships of biathlon
  - 2nd, Italian championships of biathlon, sprint
- 1992: 1st, Italian championships of biathlon, sprint
- 1993:
  - 1st, Italian championships of biathlon, sprint
  - 3rd, Italian championships of biathlon
- 1994: 2nd, Italian championships of biathlon, sprint
- 1995: 2nd, Italian championships of biathlon
