= Biathlon World Championships 1992 =

27th edition of the Biathlon World Championships

- Host city: Novosibirsk
- Country: Russia
- Events: 2
- Opening: 22 March 1992
- Closing: 22 March 1992

The 27th Biathlon World Championships held in 1992 in Novosibirsk, Russia were only for the team events because these were not part of the Olympic programme in Albertville. This was also the first time when this event was organised in Asian continent.

== Men's results ==
=== Team event ===
Date: 22 March 1992.

Medal	Name	Nation	Penalties	Result
1st place, gold medalist(s)	Commonwealth of Independent States Eugeni Redkine (0); Alexandr Tropnikov (1); Anatoly Zhdanovich (0); Alexandr Popov (1)	CIS	2	56:23.2
2nd place, silver medalist(s)	Norway Frode Løberg (0); Jon Åge Tyldum (0); Sylfest Glimsdal (2); Gisle Fenne (2)	NOR	4	56:31.3
3rd place, bronze medalist(s)	Estonia Aivo Udras (0); Hillar Zahkna (1); Urmas Kaldvee (1); Kalju Ojaste (0)	EST	2	57:13.6
4th	Slovenia Uroš Velepec (0); Jure Velepec (1); Boštjan Lekan (0); Janez Ožbolt (1)	SLO	2	57:30.4
5th	Austria Franz Schuler (1); Alfred Eder (1); Ludwig Gredler (1); Wolfgang Perner (2)	AUT	5	58:06.1
6th	France Xavier Blond (0); Thierry Dusserre (2); Patrice Bailly-Salins (2); Stéphane Bouthiaux (0)	FRA	4	58:07.5
7th	Germany Steffen Hoos (0); Raik Dittrich (1); Frank Luck (2); Jens Steinigen (1)	GER	4	59:04.7
8th	Italy Andreas Zingerle (1); Hubert Leitgeb (1); Johann Passler (1); Wilfried Pallhuber (4)	ITA	7	1:01:11.5
9th	Great Britain Paul Ryan (1); Ian Woods (2); Kenneth Rudd (3); Mike Dixon (1)	GBR	7	1:01:58.0
10th	Latvia Aivars Ieviņš (3); Aivars Bogdanovs (2); Oļegs Maļuhins (2); Gundars Upenieks (2)	LAT	9	1:04:25.9
11th	Czechoslovakia Petr Garabík (1); Miroslav Janata (1); Roman Dostál (4); Pavel Sládek (3)	TCH	9	1:04:45.7

== Women's results ==
=== Team event ===
Date: 22 March 1992.

Medal	Name	Nation	Penalties	Result
1st place, gold medalist(s)	Germany Petra Bauer (0); Uschi Disl (0); Inga Kesper (2); Petra Schaaf (0)	GER	2	56:44.5
2nd place, silver medalist(s)	Commonwealth of Independent States Elena Belova (1); Inna Sheshkil (2); Anfisa Reztsova (2); Svetlana Petcherskaia (0)	CIS	5	57:32.5
3rd place, bronze medalist(s)	Czechoslovakia Gabriela Suvová (1); Eva Háková (1); Jana Kulhavá (0); Jiřina Adamičkova (2)	TCH	4	57:59.8
4th	France Delphyne Burlet (1); Véronique Claudel (2); Anne Briand (1); Corinne Niogret (1)	FRA	5	1:00:09.7
5th	Norway Hildegunn Fossen (1); Signe Trosten (4); Grete Ingeborg Nykkelmo (3); Elin Kristiansen (0)	NOR	8	1:00:46.0

== Medal table ==
Place	Nation	1st place, gold medalist(s)	2nd place, silver medalist(s)	3rd place, bronze medalist(s)	Total
1	CIS	1	1	0	2
2	Germany	1	0	0	1
3	Norway	0	1	0	1
4	Czechoslovakia	0	0	1	1
4	Estonia	0	0	1	1
