= Iva Karagiozova-Shkodreva =

Bulgarian biathlete (born 1971)

Personal information
- Born: 21 September 1971 (age 54) Samokov, Bulgaria
Medal record
Women's biathlon
Representing Bulgaria
World Championships
| Silver medal – second place | 1991 Lahti | Team Event |
| Bronze medal – third place | 1990 Oslo | Team Event |
| Bronze medal – third place | 1991 Lahti | 15 km individual |

Iva Shkodreva-Karagiozova (Bulgarian: Ива Шкодрева-Карагьозова; born September 21, 1971, in Samokov, Bulgaria) is a former Bulgarian biathlete. She competed at the 1992, 1994 and 2002 Winter Olympics.

== Biathlon career ==
=== World Championships results ===
All results are sourced from the IBU.

| Event | Individual | Sprint | Pursuit | Relay |
|---|---|---|---|---|
| (France) 1988 Chamonix | 8th | 16th | — | — |
| (Austria) 1989 Feistritz | — | 19th | — | 4th |
| (Belarus) 1990 Minsk-Raubichi | 11th | 30th | — | Bronze |
| (Finland) 1991 Lahti | Bronze | 8th | — | Silver |
| (Bulgaria) 1993 Borovets | 28th | 21st | — | 7th |
| (Italy) 1995 Antholz-Anterselva | 31st | 43rd | — | 7th |
| (Germany) 1996 Ruhpolding | 6th | 54th | — | — |
| (Slovakia) 1997 Brezno-Osrblie | 40th | 48th | — | 8th |
| (Norway) 2000 Oslo | 35th | 41st | 26th | 6th |
| (Russia) 2003 Khanty-Mansiysk | — | 45th | 41st | — |

=== Olympic Games ===
| Year | Venue | Individual | Sprint | Pursuit | Relay |
|---|---|---|---|---|---|
| 1992 | (France) Albertville | 17th | 33rd | — | 4th |
| 1994 | (Norway) Lillehammer | 41st | 11th | — | 13th |
| 2002 | (United States) Salt Lake City | 32nd | 41st | DNS | 4th |
