= Birk Anders =

German biathlete

Personal information
- Full name: Birk Anders
- Born: 3 November 1967 (age 58) Bad Schlema, East Germany
- Height: 1.85 m (6 ft 1 in)

Sport

Professional information
- Sport: Biathlon
- Club: SG Dynamo Zinnwald
- World Cup debut: 18 December 1986

Olympic Games
- Teams: 1 (1988)
- Medals: 0

World Championships
- Teams: 3 (1987, 1989, 1990)
- Medals: 3 (2 gold)

World Cup
- Seasons: 4 (1986/87–1989/90)
- Individual victories: 4
- Individual podiums: 6
Medal record
Men's biathlon
Representing East Germany
World Championships
Gold medal – first place	1989 Feistritz	4 × 7.5 km relay
Gold medal – first place	1990 Oslo	Team event
Bronze medal – third place	1990 Kontiolahti	4 × 7.5 km relay

Birk Anders (born 3 November 1967) is a former East German biathlete. During his career he won two gold medals at the World Championships.

== Biathlon results ==
All results are sourced from the International Biathlon Union.

=== Olympic Games ===
Event	Individual	Sprint	Relay
(Canada) 1988 Calgary	—	4th	—

=== World Championships ===
3 medals (2 gold, 1 bronze)

Event	Individual	Sprint	Team	Relay
(United States) 1987 Lake Placid	—	27th	—N/a	—
(Austria) 1989 Feistritz	21st	9th	—	Gold
(Soviet Union) 1990 Minsk	32nd	13th	Gold	Bronze

*During Olympic seasons competitions are only held for those events not included in the Olympic program.
**Team was added as an event in 1989.

=== Individual victories ===
4 victories (2 In, 2 Sp)

Season	Date	Location	Discipline	Level
1988–89; 2 victories (1 In, 1 Sp)	15 December 1988	(France) Albertville	20 km individual	Biathlon World Cup
1988–89; 2 victories (1 In, 1 Sp)	21 January 1989	(People's Republic of Bulgaria) Borovets	10 km sprint	Biathlon World Cup
1989–90; 2 victories (1 In, 1 Sp)	16 December 1989	(Austria) Obertilliach	10 km sprint	Biathlon World Cup
1989–90; 2 victories (1 In, 1 Sp)	1 February 1990	(Austria) Walchsee	20 km individual	Biathlon World Cup

*Results are from UIPMB and IBU races which include the Biathlon World Cup, Biathlon World Championships and the Winter Olympic Games.
