= Frank-Peter Roetsch =

German biathlete (born 1964)

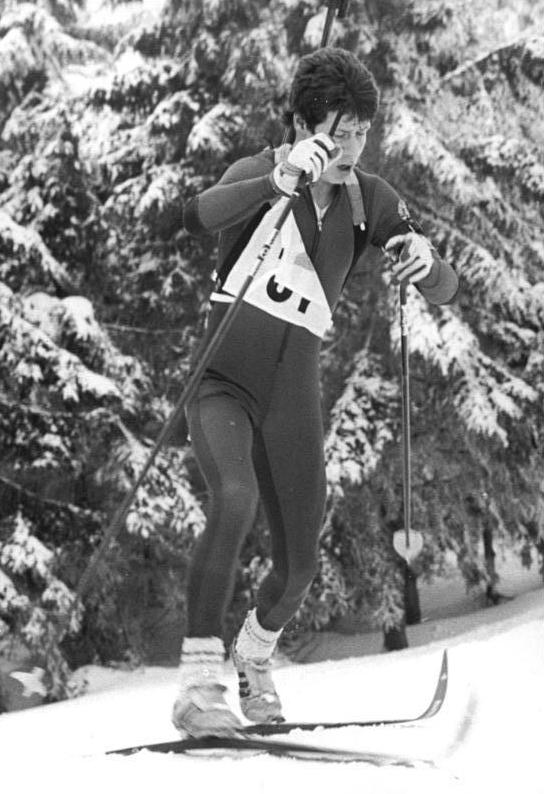
- Frank-Peter Roetsch in 1983

Personal information
- Full name: Frank-Peter Roetsch
- Born: 19 April 1964 (age 62) Güstrow, East Germany

Sport

Professional information
- Sport: Biathlon
- Club: SG Dynamo Zinnwald
- World Cup debut: 28 January 1983

Olympic Games
- Teams: 3 (1984, 1988, 1992)
- Medals: 3 (2 gold)

World Championships
- Teams: 6 (1983, 1985, 1986, 1987, 1989, 1991)
- Medals: 10 (5 gold)

World Cup
- Seasons: 10 (1982/83–1991/92)
- Individual victories: 10
- Individual podiums: 30
- Overall titles: 3 (1983–84, 1984–85, 1986–87)
Medal record
Men's biathlon
Representing East Germany
Olympic Games
Gold medal – first place	1988 Calgary	20 km individual
Gold medal – first place	1988 Calgary	10 km sprint
Silver medal – second place	1984 Sarajevo	20 km individual
World Championships
Gold medal – first place	1985 Ruhpolding	10 km sprint
Gold medal – first place	1987 Lake Placid	20 km individual
Gold medal – first place	1987 Lake Placid	10 km sprint
Gold medal – first place	1987 Lake Placid	4 × 7.5 km relay
Gold medal – first place	1989 Feistritz an der Drau	4 × 7.5 km relay
Silver medal – second place	1983 Antholz-Anterselva	20 km individual
Silver medal – second place	1983 Antholz-Anterselva	4 × 7.5 km relay
Silver medal – second place	1985 Ruhpolding	20 km individual
Silver medal – second place	1985 Ruhpolding	4 × 7.5 km relay
Silver medal – second place	1986 Oslo	4 × 7.5 km relay

Frank-Peter Roetsch (born 19 April 1964) is a German former biathlete. He was the first biathlete to win a World Cup race using the skating technique when he won in Oberhof in 1985.

== Achievements ==
=== World Championships ===
- 2 time Junior World Champion
- 5 time World Champion

=== World Cup ===
- 3 times a winner of the World Cup overall

=== Holmenkollen ===
- Won the sprint event at the Holmenkollen ski festival biathlon competition in 1985 and 1988

== Biathlon results ==
All results are sourced from the International Biathlon Union.

=== Olympic Games ===
3 medals (2 gold, 1 silver)

Event	Individual	Sprint	Relay
(Socialist Federal Republic of Yugoslavia) 1984 Sarajevo	Silver	7th	4th
(Canada) 1988 Calgary	Gold	Gold	5th
(France) 1992 Albertville	53rd	9th	—

=== World Championships ===
10 medals (5 gold, 5 silver)

Event	Individual	Sprint	Team	Relay
(Italy) 1983 Antholz-Anterselva	Silver	4th	—N/a	Silver
(West Germany) 1985 Ruhpolding	Silver	Gold	—N/a	Silver
(Norway) 1986 Oslo Holmenkollen	23rd	8th	—N/a	Silver
(United States) 1987 Lake Placid	Gold	Gold	—N/a	Gold
(Austria) 1989 Feistritz	8th	5th	—	Gold
(Finland) 1991 Lahti	7th	—	4th	—

*During Olympic seasons competitions are only held for those events not included in the Olympic program.
**Team was added as an event in 1989.

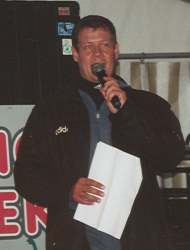
Frank-Peter Roetsch more recently

=== Individual victories ===
15 victories (4 In, 11 Sp)

Season	Date	Location	Discipline	Level
1982–83; 1 victory (1 Sp)	10 March 1983	(Norway) Oslo Holmenkollen	10 km sprint	Biathlon World Cup
1983–84; 1 victory (1 Sp)	3 March 1984	(East Germany) Oberhof	10 km sprint	Biathlon World Cup
1984–85; 5 victories (1 In, 4 Sp)	19 January 1985	(East Germany) Oberhof	10 km sprint	Biathlon World Cup
1984–85; 5 victories (1 In, 4 Sp)	24 January 1985	(Italy) Antholz-Anterselva	20 km individual	Biathlon World Cup
1984–85; 5 victories (1 In, 4 Sp)	16 February 1985	(West Germany) Ruhpolding	10 km sprint	Biathlon World Championships
1984–85; 5 victories (1 In, 4 Sp)	3 March 1985	(Finland) Lahti	10 km sprint	Biathlon World Cup
1984–85; 5 victories (1 In, 4 Sp)	9 March 1985	(Norway) Oslo Holmenkollen	10 km sprint	Biathlon World Cup
1986–87; 3 victories (2 In, 1 Sp)	15 January 1987	(Italy) Antholz-Anterselva	20 km individual	Biathlon World Cup
1986–87; 3 victories (2 In, 1 Sp)	12 February 1987	(United States) Lake Placid	20 km individual	Biathlon World Championships
1986–87; 3 victories (2 In, 1 Sp)	14 February 1987	(United States) Lake Placid	10 km sprint	Biathlon World Championships
1987–88; 4 victories (1 In, 3 Sp)	21 January 1988	(Italy) Antholz-Anterselva	10 km sprint	Biathlon World Cup
1987–88; 4 victories (1 In, 3 Sp)	20 February 1988	(Canada) Calgary	20 km individual	Winter Olympic Games
1987–88; 4 victories (1 In, 3 Sp)	23 February 1988	(Canada) Calgary	10 km sprint	Winter Olympic Games
1987–88; 4 victories (1 In, 3 Sp)	12 March 1988	(Norway) Oslo Holmenkollen	10 km sprint	Biathlon World Cup
1988–89; 1 victory (1 Sp)	28 January 1989	(West Germany) Ruhpolding	10 km sprint	Biathlon World Cup

*Results are from UIPMB and IBU races which include the Biathlon World Cup, Biathlon World Championships and the Winter Olympic Games.
