= Juri Kashkarov =

Soviet biathlete

Personal information
- Full name: Juri Fyodorovich Kashkarov
- Born: 4 December 1963 (age 62) Khanty-Mansiysk, RSFSR, Soviet Union

Sport

Professional information
- Sport: Biathlon

Olympic Games
- Teams: 2 (1984, 1988)
- Medals: 1 (1 gold)

World Championships
- Teams: 7 (1983, 1985, 1986, 1987, 1989, 1990, 1991)
- Medals: 9 (5 gold)

World Cup
- Seasons: 9 (1982/83–1990/91)
- Individual victories: 6
- Individual podiums: 9
Medal record
Men's biathlon
Representing Soviet Union
Olympic Games
Gold medal – first place	1984 Sarajevo	4 × 7.5 km relay
World Championships
Gold medal – first place	1983 Antholz-Anterselva	4 × 7.5 km relay
Gold medal – first place	1985 Ruhpolding	20 km individual
Gold medal – first place	1985 Ruhpolding	4 × 7.5 km relay
Gold medal – first place	1986 Oslo	4 × 7.5 km relay
Gold medal – first place	1989 Feistritz an der Drau	Team event
Silver medal – second place	1987 Lake Placid	4 × 7.5 km relay
Silver medal – second place	1989 Feistritz an der Drau	4 × 7.5 km relay
Silver medal – second place	1991 Lahti	4 × 7.5 km relay
Bronze medal – third place	1989 Feistritz an der Drau	10 km sprint
Junior World Championships
Gold medal – first place	1982 Minsk	15 km individual
Gold medal – first place	1983 Antholz-Anterselva	10 km sprint
Silver medal – second place	1982 Minsk	3 × 7.5 km relay
Bronze medal – third place	1982 Minsk	10 km sprint

Juri Fyodorovich Kashkarov (Russian: Юрий Фёдорович Кашкаров; born 4 December 1963) is a former Soviet biathlete.

== Life and career ==
Kashkarov was arguably the best Soviet biathlete of the mid-1980s. Kashkarov won his first international medals at the 1982 World Junior Championships, where he won a full set of medals, gold in the 15 km individual, silver in the relay and bronze in 10 km sprint. From 1983 to 1991, Kashkarov competed at every Biathlon World Championships that were open to men, and won medals at every one of them, except in 1990. He won relay golds at the 1983, 1985 and 1986 World Championships and golds in the 20 km individual in 1985 and the team event in 1989.

In addition to his five World Championships titles, Kashkarov won silvers at the World Championship in the 1987, 1989 and 1991 relays, and a bronze in the 10 km sprint event in 1989. Kashkarov also competed at two Olympics, winning a relay gold in 1984. His best individual result at the Olympic Games was fifth in the 20 km individual in 1988. In the World Cup, Kashkarov won six individual victories and finished a total of nine times on the podium individually. His best finish in the overall World Cup was second in the 1984–85 World Cup season. Domestically, Kashkarov won three Soviet titles – in 1986 in the 20 km and in 1987 in the 10 km and 25 km military patrol.

After his sporting career, Kashkarov worked as a biathlon coach with Dynamo Moskva.

== Biathlon results ==
All results are sourced from the International Biathlon Union.

=== Olympic Games ===
1 medal (1 gold)

Event	Individual	Sprint	Relay
(Socialist Federal Republic of Yugoslavia) 1984 Sarajevo	35th	10th	Gold
(Canada) 1988 Calgary	5th	18th	—

=== World Championships ===
9 medals (5 gold, 3 silver, 1 bronze)

Event	Individual	Sprint	Team	Relay
(Italy) 1983 Antholz-Anterselva	7th	—	—N/a	Gold
(West Germany) 1985 Ruhpolding	Gold	12th	—N/a	Gold
(Norway) 1986 Oslo Holmenkollen	6th	28th	—N/a	Gold
(United States) 1987 Lake Placid	5th	6th	—N/a	Silver
(Austria) 1989 Feistritz	—	Bronze	Gold	Silver
(Soviet Union) 1990 Minsk	4th	11th	4th	5th
(Finland) 1991 Lahti	—	12th	—	Silver

*During Olympic seasons competitions are only held for those events not included in the Olympic program.
**Team was added as an event in 1989.

=== Individual victories ===
7 victories (2 In, 5 Sp)

Season	Date	Location	Discipline	Level
1983–84; 1 victory (1 In)	1 March 1984	(East Germany) Oberhof	20 km individual	Biathlon World Cup
1984–85; 2 victories (1 In, 1 Sp)	12 January 1985	(Soviet Union) Minsk	10 km sprint	Biathlon World Cup
1984–85; 2 victories (1 In, 1 Sp)	14 February 1985	(West Germany) Ruhpolding	20 km individual	Biathlon World Championships
1986–87; 1 victory (1 Sp)	21 February 1987	(Canada) Canmore	10 km sprint	Biathlon World Cup
1989–90; 3 victories (3 Sp)	18 January 1990	(Italy) Antholz-Anterselva	10 km sprint	Biathlon World Cup
1989–90; 3 victories (3 Sp)	27 January 1990	(West Germany) Ruhpolding	10 km sprint	Biathlon World Cup
1989–90; 3 victories (3 Sp)	3 February 1990	(Austria) Walchsee	10 km sprint	Biathlon World Cup

*Results are from UIPMB and IBU races which include the Biathlon World Cup, Biathlon World Championships and the Winter Olympic Games.
