= Aleksandr Popov (biathlete) =

Russian biathlete (born 1965)

Alexandr Popov
Personal information
- Full name: Alexandr Vladimirovich Popov
- Born: 22 February 1965 (age 61) Tobolsk, Russian SFSR, Soviet Union
- Height: 1.76 m (5 ft 9 in)

Sport

Professional information
- Sport: Biathlon
- Club: Dynamo Minsk
- World Cup debut: 18 January 1986

Olympic Games
- Teams: 4 (1988, 1992, 1994, 1998)
- Medals: 2 (1 gold)

World Championships
- Teams: 10 (1987, 1989, 1991, 1992, 1993, 1994, 1995, 1996, 1997, 1998)
- Medals: 10 (4 gold)

World Cup
- Seasons: 13 (1985/86–1997/98)
- Individual victories: 5
- Individual podiums: 16
Medal record
Men's biathlon
Representing Belarus
World Championships
Gold medal – first place	1996 Ruhpolding	Team event
Gold medal – first place	1997 Brezno-Osrblie	Team event
Bronze medal – third place	1995 Antholz-Anterselva	4 × 7.5 km relay
Bronze medal – third place	1996 Ruhpolding	4 × 7.5 km relay
Representing the CIS
World Championships
Gold medal – first place	1992 Novosibirsk	Team event
Representing the Unified Team
Olympic Games
Silver medal – second place	1992 Albertville	4 × 7.5 km relay
Representing Soviet Union
Olympic Games
Gold medal – first place	1988 Calgary	4 × 7.5 km relay
World Championships
Gold medal – first place	1989 Feistritz an der Drau	Team event
Silver medal – second place	1987 Lake Placid	4 × 7.5 km relay
Silver medal – second place	1989 Feistritz an der Drau	4 × 7.5 km relay
Silver medal – second place	1991 Lahti	20 km individual
Silver medal – second place	1991 Lahti	4 × 7.5 km relay

Alexandr Vladimirovich Popov (Russian: Александр Владимирович Попов; born 22 February 1965) is a Russian biathlete who competed for the USSR, the Unified Team and Belarus. Since 1999, he has been the head coach of the Belarus National Biathlon Team.

== Biathlon results ==
All results are sourced from the International Biathlon Union.

=== Olympic Games ===
2 medals (1 gold, 1 silver)

Event	Individual	Sprint	Relay
(Canada) 1988 Calgary	12th	—	Gold
(France) 1992 Albertville	4th	18th	Silver
(Norway) 1994 Lillehammer	4th	10th	4th
(Japan) 1998 Nagano	29th	55th	4th

=== World Championships ===
10 medals (4 gold, 4 silver, 2 bronze)

Event	Individual	Sprint	Pursuit	Team	Relay
(United States) 1987 Lake Placid	12th	DSQ	—N/a	—N/a	Silver
(Austria) 1989 Feistritz	19th	8th	—N/a	Gold	Silver
(Finland) 1991 Lahti	Silver	—	—N/a	—	Silver
(Russia) 1992 Novosibirsk	—N/a	—N/a	—N/a	Gold	—N/a
(Bulgaria) 1993 Borovets	14th	18th	—N/a	6th	4th
(Canada) 1994 Canmore	—N/a	—N/a	—N/a	9th	—N/a
(Italy) 1995 Antholz-Anterselva	13th	6th	—N/a	8th	Bronze
(Germany) 1996 Ruhpolding	7th	21st	—N/a	Gold	Bronze
(Slovakia) 1997 Brezno-Osrblie	—	18th	27th	Gold	4th
(Slovenia) 1998 Pokljuka	—N/a	—N/a	18th	12th	—N/a

*During Olympic seasons competitions are only held for those events not included in the Olympic program.
**Team was added as an event in 1989, with pursuit being added in 1997.

=== Individual victories ===
5 victories (2 In, 3 Sp)

Season	Date	Location	Discipline	Level
1986–87; 1 victory (1 Sp)	17 January 1987	(Italy) Antholz-Anterselva	10 km sprint	Biathlon World Cup
1988–89; 1 victory (1 In)	2 March 1989	(Finland) Hämeenlinna	20 km individual	Biathlon World Cup
1990–91; 1 victory (1 In)	24 January 1991	(Italy) Antholz-Anterselva	20 km individual	Biathlon World Cup
1991–92; 2 victories (2 Sp)	21 December 1991	(Austria) Hochfilzen	10 km sprint	Biathlon World Cup
1991–92; 2 victories (2 Sp)	25 January 1992	(Italy) Antholz-Anterselva	10 km sprint	Biathlon World Cup

*Results are from UIPMB and IBU races which include the Biathlon World Cup, Biathlon World Championships and the Winter Olympic Games.
