= Mark Kirchner =

German biathlete (born 1970)

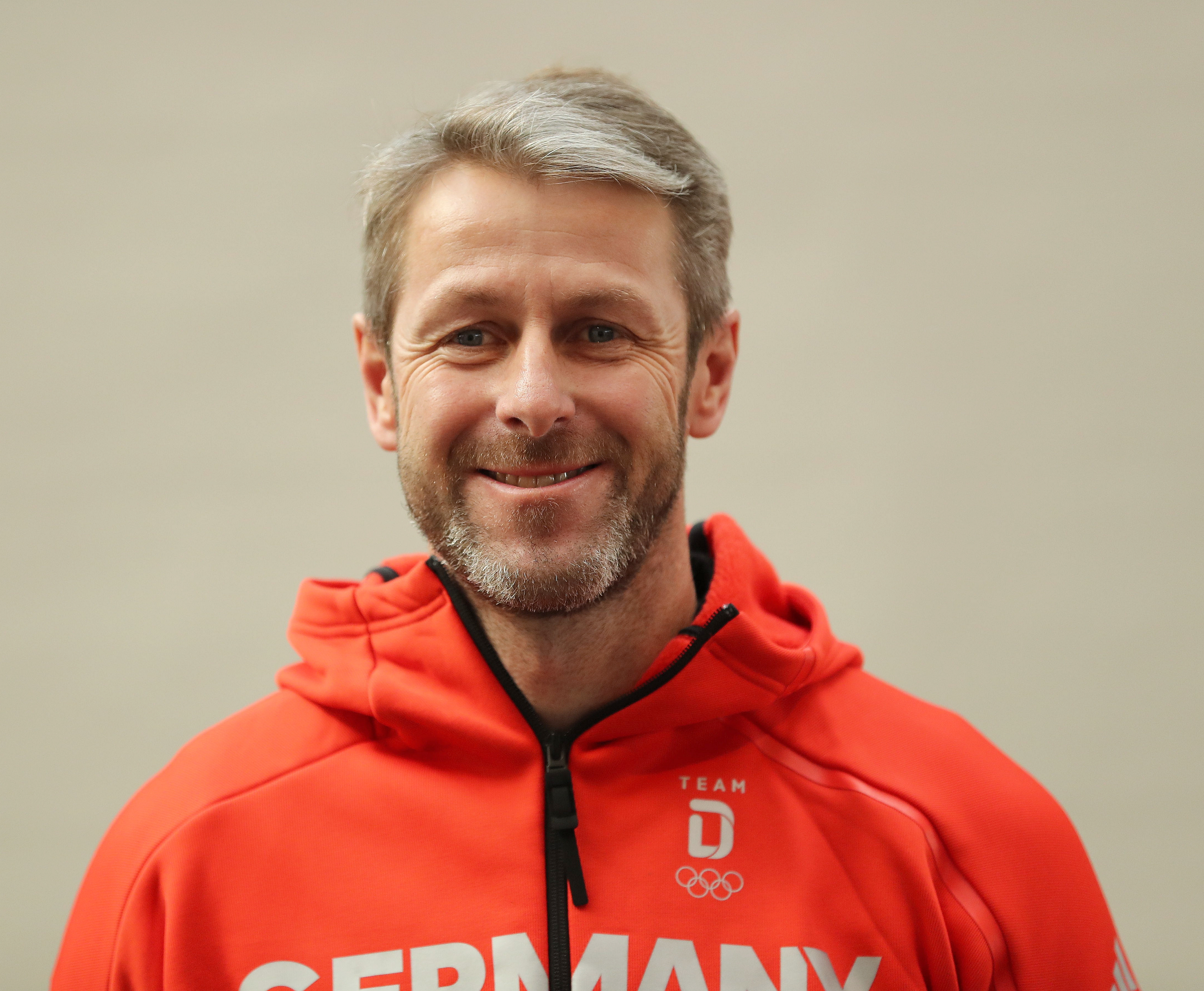

Personal information
- Full name: Mark Kirchner
- Born: 4 April 1970 (age 56) Neuhaus am Rennweg, Thuringia, East Germany
- Height: 1.78 m (5 ft 10 in)

Sport

Professional information
- Sport: Biathlon
- World Cup debut: 14 December 1989

Olympic Games
- Teams: 2 (1992, 1994)
- Medals: 4 (3 gold)

World Championships
- Teams: 6 (1990, 1991, 1993, 1995, 1996, 1997)
- Medals: 10 (7 gold)

World Cup
- Seasons: 9 (1989/90–1997/98)
- Individual victories: 7
- Individual podiums: 12
- Discipline titles: 1: 1 Individual (1990–91)
Medal record
Men's biathlon
Representing Germany
Olympic Games
Gold medal – first place	1992 Albertville	4 × 7.5 km relay
Gold medal – first place	1992 Albertville	10 km sprint
Gold medal – first place	1994 Lillehammer	4 × 7.5 km relay
Silver medal – second place	1992 Albertville	20 km individual
World Championships
Gold medal – first place	1991 Lahti	20 km individual
Gold medal – first place	1991 Lahti	10 km sprint
Gold medal – first place	1991 Lahti	4 × 7.5 km relay
Gold medal – first place	1993 Borovets	10 km sprint
Gold medal – first place	1995 Antholz-Anterselva	4 × 7.5 km relay
Silver medal – second place	1997 Brezno-Osrblie	Team event
Bronze medal – third place	1993 Borovets	4 × 7.5 km relay
Representing East Germany
World Championships
Gold medal – first place	1990 Oslo	10 km sprint
Gold medal – first place	1990 Oslo	Team event
Bronze medal – third place	1990 Kontiolahti	4 × 7.5 km relay

Mark Kirchner (born 4 April 1970) is a German former biathlete.

== Life and career ==
Kirchner won gold in the 10 km sprint at the Albertville Olympics in 1992 and followed that up by taking silver in the 20 km individual and gold in the relay. An out-of-the-blue win by Eugeni Redkine of the Unified Team in the 20 km individual prevented him taking honours as the absolute champion of these Games.

In 1994 in Lillehammer, he was his country's flag bearer and was part of the gold-medal winning relay team. He was the youngest ever triple Olympic Champion in biathlon, at the age of just 23 years and 10 month.

Kirchner came second in the overall World Cup standings twice, behind Sergei Tchepikov of the USSR in the 1990–91 season and behind Mikael Löfgren of Sweden in 1992–93.

In addition Kirchner became World Champion multiple times.

He retired relatively early, at the age of 28, in 1998.

Subsequently, Kirchner was employed as an assistant to Frank Ullrich, the German biathlon male team head coach, with responsibilities including youth development. In April 2014, he was appointed as men's coach for the national team.

== Biathlon results ==
All results are sourced from the International Biathlon Union.

=== Olympic Games ===
4 medals (3 gold, 1 silver)

Event	Individual	Sprint	Relay
(France) 1992 Albertville	Silver	Gold	Gold
(Norway) 1994 Lillehammer	7th	12th	Gold

=== World Championships ===
10 medals (7 gold, 1 silver, 2 bronze)

Event	Individual	Sprint	Pursuit	Team	Relay
(Soviet Union) 1990 Minsk	13th	Gold	—N/a	Gold	Bronze
(Finland) 1991 Lahti	Gold	Gold	—N/a	—	Gold
(Bulgaria) 1993 Borovets	20th	Gold	—N/a	—	Bronze
(Italy) 1995 Antholz-Anterselva	15th	52nd	—N/a	—	Gold
(Germany) 1996 Ruhpolding	—	36th	—N/a	6th	—
(Slovakia) 1997 Brezno-Osrblie	43rd	32nd	14th	Silver	—

*During Olympic seasons competitions are only held for those events not included in the Olympic program.
**Pursuit was added as an event in 1997.

=== Individual victories ===
11 victories (6 In, 5 Sp)

Season	Date	Location	Discipline	Level
1989–90; 1 victory (1 Sp)	10 March 1990	(Norway) Oslo Holmenkollen	10 km sprint	Biathlon World Championships
1990–91; 4 victories (3 In, 1 Sp)	31 January 1991	(Germany) Oberhof	20 km individual	Biathlon World Cup
1990–91; 4 victories (3 In, 1 Sp)	19 February 1991	(Finland) Lahti	10 km sprint	Biathlon World Championships
1990–91; 4 victories (3 In, 1 Sp)	24 February 1991	(Finland) Lahti	20 km individual	Biathlon World Championships
1990–91; 4 victories (3 In, 1 Sp)	7 March 1991	(Norway) Oslo Holmenkollen	20 km individual	Biathlon World Cup
1991–92; 2 victories (1 In, 1 Sp)	12 February 1992	(France) Albertville	10 km sprint	Winter Olympic Games
1991–92; 2 victories (1 In, 1 Sp)	10 March 1992	(Norway) Skrautvål	20 km individual	Biathlon World Cup
1992–93; 3 victories (1 In, 2 Sp)	19 December 1992	(Slovenia) Pokljuka	10 km sprint	Biathlon World Cup
1992–93; 3 victories (1 In, 2 Sp)	13 February 1993	(Bulgaria) Borovets	10 km sprint	Biathlon World Championships
1992–93; 3 victories (1 In, 2 Sp)	11 March 1993	(Sweden) Östersund	20 km individual	Biathlon World Cup
1996–97; 1 victory (1 In)	6 March 1997	(Japan) Nagano	20 km individual	Biathlon World Cup

*Results are from UIPMB and IBU races which include the Biathlon World Cup, Biathlon World Championships and the Winter Olympic Games.
