= Ian Woods =

British biathlete (born 1966)

Personal information
- Nationality: British
- Born: 7 June 1966 (age 59); Dalbeattie, Scotland

Sport
- Sport: Biathlon

Ian Woods (born 7 June 1966) is a British former biathlete. He competed at the 1992 Winter Olympics and the 1994 Winter Olympics. Following his sporting career, Woods became a director at the YMCA in Windermere, and was a church pastor in Cockermouth. He also worked in consultancy for people development.
