= Valeriy Medvedtsev =

Russian biathlete

Personal information
- Full name: Valeriy Alekseyevich Medvedtsev
- Born: 5 July 1964 (age 62) Izhevsk, RSFSR, Soviet Union

Sport

Professional information
- Sport: Biathlon
- World Cup debut: 16 January 1986

Olympic Games
- Teams: 3 (1988, 1992, 1994)
- Medals: 4 (1 gold)

World Championships
- Teams: 6 (1986, 1987, 1989, 1990, 1991, 1993)
- Medals: 7 (4 gold)

World Cup
- Seasons: 9 (1985/86–1993/94)
- Individual victories: 4
- Individual podiums: 12
Medal record
Men's biathlon
Representing Russia
World Championships
Silver medal – second place	1993 Borovets	4 × 7.5 km relay
Representing the Unified Team
Olympic Games
Silver medal – second place	1992 Albertville	4 × 7.5 km relay
Representing Soviet Union
Olympic Games
Gold medal – first place	1988 Calgary	4 × 7.5 km relay
Silver medal – second place	1988 Calgary	20 km individual
Silver medal – second place	1988 Calgary	10 km sprint
World Championships
Gold medal – first place	1986 Oslo	20 km individual
Gold medal – first place	1986 Oslo	10 km sprint
Gold medal – first place	1986 Oslo	4 × 7.5 km relay
Gold medal – first place	1990 Minsk	20 km individual
Silver medal – second place	1987 Lake Placid	4 × 7.5 km relay
Bronze medal – third place	1991 Lahti	Team event

Valeriy Alekseyevich Medvedtsev (Russian: Валерий Алексеевич Медведцев; born 5 July 1964) is a former Russian biathlete.

== Career ==
On 16 January 1986, Medvedtsev achieved the feat of winning his World Cup debut. He trained at the Armed Forces sports society in Izhevsk. At the 1988 Olympics in Calgary, Medvedtsev, competing for the USSR, won two silver medals in the 10 km sprint and the 20 km individual, and also gold medal in the relay. At the 1992 Olympics in Albertville he won a silver medal in the relay competition for the Unified Team. In the World Championships, Medvedtsev has three relay medals gold from 1986 in Oslo, silver from 1987 in Lake Placid and silver from 1993 in Borovets. And he also has two individual gold medals from the World Championships, gold medals in the 20 km from 1986 in Oslo (Holmenkollen Ski Festival biathlon) and 1990 in Minsk. He also has one gold medal from the 10 km from 1986 in Oslo (Holmenkollen Ski Festival biathlon).

== Biathlon results ==
All results are sourced from the International Biathlon Union.

=== Olympic Games ===
4 medals (1 gold, 3 silver)

Event	Individual	Sprint	Relay
(Canada) 1988 Calgary	Silver	Silver	Gold
(France) 1992 Albertville	—	25th	Silver
(Norway) 1994 Lillehammer	24th	—	—

=== World Championships ===
7 medals (4 gold, 2 silver, 1 bronze)

Event	Individual	Sprint	Team	Relay
(Norway) 1986 Oslo Holmenkollen	Gold	Gold	—N/a	Gold
(United States) 1987 Lake Placid	4th	5th	—N/a	Silver
(Austria) 1989 Feistritz	27th	11th	—	—
(Soviet Union) 1990 Minsk	Gold	8th	4th	5th
(Finland) 1991 Lahti	—	7th	Bronze	—
(Bulgaria) 1993 Borovets	57th	34th	—	Silver

*During Olympic seasons competitions are only held for those events not included in the Olympic program.
**Team was added as an event in 1989.

=== Individual victories ===
6 victories (5 In, 1 Sp)

Season	Date	Location	Discipline	Level
1985–86; 3 victories (2 In, 1 Sp)	16 January 1986	(Italy) Antholz-Anterselva	20 km individual	Biathlon World Cup
1985–86; 3 victories (2 In, 1 Sp)	20 February 1986	(Norway) Oslo Holmenkollen	20 km individual	Biathlon World Championships
1985–86; 3 victories (2 In, 1 Sp)	22 February 1986	(Norway) Oslo Holmenkollen	10 km sprint	Biathlon World Championships
1986–87; 2 victories (2 In)	18 December 1986	(Austria) Obertauern	20 km individual	Biathlon World Cup
1986–87; 2 victories (2 In)	19 February 1987	(Canada) Canmore	20 km individual	Biathlon World Cup
1989–90; 1 victory (1 In)	3 March 1990	(Soviet Union) Minsk	20 km individual	Biathlon World Championships

*Results are from UIPMB and IBU races which include the Biathlon World Cup, Biathlon World Championships and the Winter Olympic Games.
