= Sergei Bulygin =

Soviet biathlete (born 1963)

Personal information
- Full name: Sergei Ivanovich Bulygin
- Born: 10 July 1963 (age 63) Solovyovka, Novosibirsk Oblast, RSFSR, Soviet Union

Sport

Professional information
- Sport: Biathlon

Olympic Games
- Teams: 1 (1984)
- Medals: 1 (1 gold)

World Championships
- Teams: 4 (1983, 1985, 1986, 1989)
- Medals: 5 (4 gold)

World Cup
- Seasons: 7 (1982/83–1988/89)
- Individual victories: 1
- Individual podiums: 2
Medal record
Men's biathlon
Representing Soviet Union
Olympic Games
Gold medal – first place	1984 Sarajevo	4 × 7.5 km relay
World Championships
Gold medal – first place	1983 Antholz-Anterselva	4 × 7.5 km relay
Gold medal – first place	1985 Ruhpolding	4 × 7.5 km relay
Gold medal – first place	1986 Oslo	4 × 7.5 km relay
Gold medal – first place	1989 Feistritz an der Drau	Team event
Silver medal – second place	1989 Feistritz an der Drau	4 × 7.5 km relay

Sergei Ivanovich Bulygin (Russian: Серге́й Иванович Булы́гин; born 10 July 1963) is a former Soviet biathlete. During his career he won an Olympic gold medal as part of the Soviet Union 4 × 7.5 km relay team in the 1984 Winter Olympics in Sarajevo and 4 gold medals and a silver at the World Championships.

== Biathlon results ==
All results are sourced from the International Biathlon Union.

=== Olympic Games ===
1 medal (1 gold)

Event	Individual	Sprint	Relay
(Socialist Federal Republic of Yugoslavia) 1984 Sarajevo	17th	11th	Gold

=== World Championships ===
9 medals (5 gold, 3 silver, 1 bronze)

Event	Individual	Sprint	Team	Relay
(Italy) 1983 Antholz-Anterselva	6th	9th	—N/a	Gold
(West Germany) 1985 Ruhpolding	12th	16th	—N/a	Gold
(Norway) 1986 Oslo Holmenkollen	—	54th	—N/a	Gold
(Austria) 1989 Feistritz	24th	—	Gold	Silver

*During Olympic seasons competitions are only held for those events not included in the Olympic program.
**Team was added as an event in 1989.

=== Individual victories ===
1 victory (1 In)

Season	Date	Location	Discipline	Level
1988–89; 1 victory (1 In)	26 January 1989	(West Germany) Ruhpolding	20 km individual	Biathlon World Cup

*Results are from UIPMB and IBU races which include the Biathlon World Cup, Biathlon World Championships and the Winter Olympic Games.
