= Svetlana Petcherskaia =

Soviet biathlete (born 1968)

Medal record

Women's biathlon

Representing Unified Team

Olympic Games
Silver medal – second place	1992 Albertville	15 km individual

Representing Soviet Union

World Championships
Gold medal – first place	1989 Feistritz an der Drau	Team event
Gold medal – first place	1989 Feistritz an der Drau	3 × 7.5 km relay
Gold medal – first place	1990 Minsk	15 km individual
Gold medal – first place	1990 Oslo	Team event
Gold medal – first place	1990 Oslo	3 × 7.5 km relay
Gold medal – first place	1991 Lahti	Team event
Gold medal – first place	1991 Lahti	3 × 7.5 km relay
Silver medal – second place	1990 Oslo	7.5 km sprint
Silver medal – second place	1991 Lahti	7.5 km sprint
Silver medal – second place	1992 Novosibirsk	Team event
Bronze medal – third place	1989 Feistritz an der Drau	15 km individual

Svetlana Vladimirovna Petcherskaia (Russian: Светлана Владимировна Печёрская); (née Davidova), born 14 November 1968 in Sverdlovsk, is a former Soviet Union biathlete. The first time women's biathlon was contested at the Winter Olympics in Albertville in 1992, Petcherskia won a silver medal in the women's 15 km individual for the Unified Team. In the 1990/91 season she won the overall world cup. In 1990 she became world champion in the 15 km. During her career she won a total of 7 gold medals at World Championships, together with 3 silver medals and 1 bronze.
