= Elena Golovina =

Russian biathlete (born 1961)

Personal information
- Born: 16 February 1961 (age 65)

Sport
- Sport: Skiing

World Cup career
- Indiv. wins: 1 (1988-89)
Medal record
Women's biathlon
Representing Soviet Union
World Championships
Gold medal – first place	1985 Egg am Etzel	3 × 5 km relay
Gold medal – first place	1987 Lahti	5 km sprint
Gold medal – first place	1987 Lahti	3 × 5 km relay
Gold medal – first place	1988 Chamonix	3 × 5 km relay
Gold medal – first place	1989 Feitritz	Team event
Gold medal – first place	1989 Feitritz	3 × 7.5 km relay
Gold medal – first place	1990 Oslo	Team event
Gold medal – first place	1990 Oslo	3 × 7.5 km relay
Gold medal – first place	1991 Lahti	Team event
Gold medal – first place	1991 Lahti	3 × 7.5 km relay
Silver medal – second place	1990 Minsk	10 km individual
Bronze medal – third place	1991 Lahti	5 km sprint

Elena Golovina (Russian: Елена Викторовна Головина; born 16 February 1961) is a retired Soviet, later Russian biathlete.

She has participated at the 1992 Winter Olympics. Golovina won the Overall World Cup in 1988–89 World Cup season. Golovina claimed 12 medals at Biathlon World Championships: ten gold, one silver and one bronze. She is second most successful woman of all time at Biathlon World Championships.
