= Mariya Manolova =

Bulgarian biathlete (born 1963)

Personal information
- Nationality: Bulgarian
- Born: 6 September 1963 (age 61); Chepelare, Bulgaria

Sport
- Sport: Biathlon

Mariya Manolova (Bulgarian: Мария Манолова, born 6 September 1963) is a Bulgarian biathlete. She competed at the 1992 Winter Olympics and the 1994 Winter Olympics.
