= Herbert Fritzenwenger =

West German cross country skier and biathlete

Medal record

Men's biathlon

Representing West Germany

World Championships
Silver medal – second place	1989 Feistritz an der Drau	Team event
Bronze medal – third place	1985 Ruhpolding	4 × 7.5 km relay
Bronze medal – third place	1987 Lake Placid	4 × 7.5 km relay

Herbert Fritzenwenger (born 7 October 1962 in Ruhpolding) is a West German cross-country skier and Biathlete who competed in the late 1980s, including the 1988 Winter Olympics. During his career he collected a silver medal and two bronze medals at World Championships.

== Cross-country skiing results ==
=== Olympic Games ===
Year	Age	15 km	30 km	50 km	4 × 10 km relay
1988	20	—	—	22	7
