= Petra Behle =

German biathlete (born 1969)

Medal record

Women's biathlon

Representing Germany

Olympic Games
Gold medal – first place	1998 Nagano	4 × 7.5 km relay
Silver medal – second place	1992 Albertville	3 × 7.5 km relay
Silver medal – second place	1994 Lillehammer	4 × 7.5 km relay

World Championships
Gold medal – first place	1991 Lahti	15 km individual
Gold medal – first place	1992 Novosibirsk	Team event
Gold medal – first place	1993 Borovets	15 km individual
Gold medal – first place	1995 Antholz-Anterselva	4 × 7.5 km relay
Gold medal – first place	1996 Ruhpolding	Team event
Gold medal – first place	1996 Ruhpolding	4 × 7.5 km relay
Gold medal – first place	1997 Brezno-Osrblie	4 × 7.5 km relay
Silver medal – second place	1995 Antholz-Anterselva	Team event

Representing West Germany

World Championships
Gold medal – first place	1988 Chamonix	5 km sprint
Gold medal – first place	1989 Feistritz an der Drau	15 km individual
Silver medal – second place	1990 Oslo	Team event
Bronze medal – third place	1989 Feistritz an der Drau	Team event
Bronze medal – third place	1990 Oslo	15 km individual

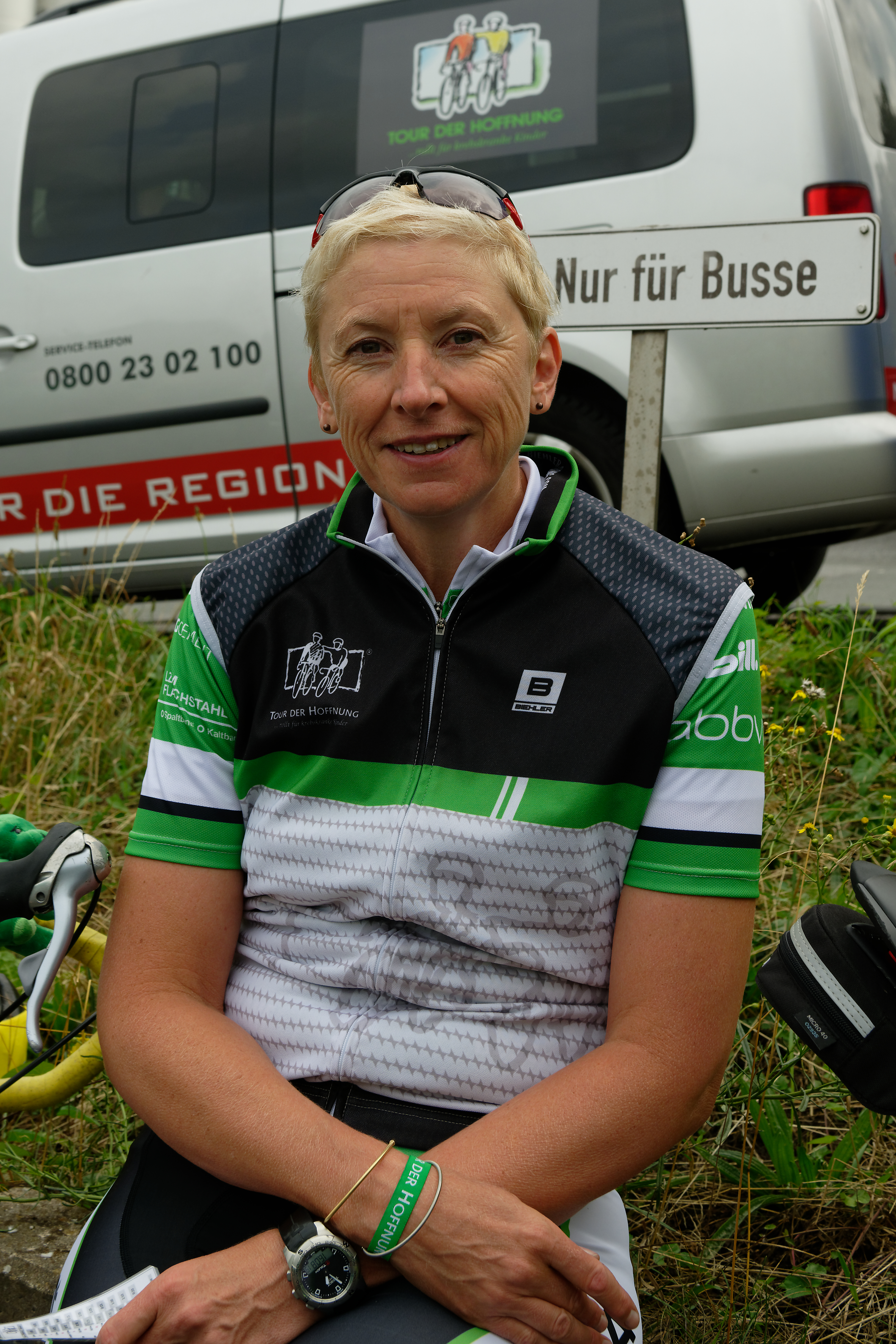

Petra Behle (née Schaaf; born 5 January 1969 in Offenbach am Main) is a former German biathlete.

== Career ==
Behle won her first gold medal in the 1988 World Championships when she was 19 and she also has three gold medals in the 15 km that happened in 1989, 1991 and 1993 she also has three biathlon-world championship medals in relays from 1995, 1996 and 1997. She has 1 gold and 2 silver medals from olympic relays silver in 1992 and 1994 and gold medal from 1998. And she also has two team world championship gold medals from Novosibirsk in 1992 and Ruhpolding in 1996. She was married to Jochen Behle.
