= Anna Kuzmina =

Soviet Yakut actress and politician

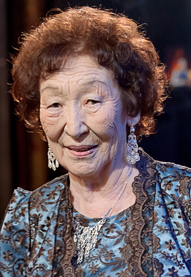
- Kuzmina in April 2014
- Born: March 3, 1933; Khangalassky District, Soviet Yakutia, Soviet Russia, USSR
- Died: November 25, 2017 (aged 84); Yakutsk, Sakha Republic, Russia

Anna Ivanovna Kuzmina (Russian: Анна Ивановна Кузьмина; 3 March 1933 – 25 November 2017) was a Yakut Russian actress and author of the Soviet era and after. She was born in Khangalassky District, Russia. For her work she was named an Honored Artist of the RSFSR (1982) and People's Artist of the Republic of Sakha (2003).

Kuzmina was a 1955 graduate of the Sakha Republic branch of the Moscow Theater School, specializing in drama and film. In that year she began working at the theater in Yakutsk, today the Sakha Academic Theater. She was known for her role in the television series Umnullubat sulustar ("Unfading Stars"); films in which she starred include Motuo, Taiwan Island and Yalylyylar. During her career she was named a deputy to the 8th Convocation of the Supreme Soviet of the Yakut ASSR; she was also a member of the Higher Council of Elders of the Sakha Republic. In 2010, she published a book about theater in the Sakha Republic. Kuzmina was married to Mikhail Gogolev. She died in Yakutsk.
