= Thierry Gerbier =

French biathlete (1965–2013)

Personal information
- Nationality: French
- Born: 21 September 1965 Chambéry, France
- Died: 13 November 2013 (aged 48) Le Pontet, France

Sport
- Sport: Biathlon

Thierry Gerbier (21 September 1965 – 13 November 2013) was a French biathlete. He competed at the 1988 Winter Olympics and the 1992 Winter Olympics.
