= Biathlon World Championships 1993 =

Sports competition in Borovets, Bulgaria

- Host city: Borovets
- Country: Bulgaria
- Events: 8
- Opening: 9 February 1993
- Closing: 14 February 1993

The 28th Biathlon World Championships were held in 1993 in Borovets, Bulgaria.

== Men's results ==
=== 20 km individual ===
| Medal | Name | Nation | Penalties | Result |
|---|---|---|---|---|
| 1st place, gold medalist(s) | Andreas Zingerle | ITA | 1 | 53:05.4 |
| 2nd place, silver medalist(s) | Sergei Tarasov | RUS | 2 | 53:49.9 |
| 3rd place, bronze medalist(s) | Sergei Tchepikov | RUS | 1 | 54:38.3 |

=== 10 km sprint ===
| Medal | Name | Nation | Penalties | Result |
|---|---|---|---|---|
| 1st place, gold medalist(s) | Mark Kirchner | GER | 0 | 27:30.5 |
| 2nd place, silver medalist(s) | Jon Åge Tyldum | NOR | 1 | 27:44.9 |
| 3rd place, bronze medalist(s) | Sergei Tarasov | RUS | 1 | 27:46.7 |

=== Team event ===
| Medal | Name | Nation | Penalties | Result |
|---|---|---|---|---|
| 1st place, gold medalist(s) | Germany Fritz Fischer; Frank Luck; Steffen Hoos; Sven Fischer | GER | | |
| 2nd place, silver medalist(s) | Russia Aleksei Kobelev; Valeri Kiriyenko; Sergei Loschkin; Sergei Tchepikov | RUS | | |
| 3rd place, bronze medalist(s) | France Gilles Marguet; Thierry Dusserre; Xavier Blond; Lionel Laurent | FRA | | |

=== 4 × 7.5 km relay ===
| Medal | Name | Nation | Penalties | Result |
|---|---|---|---|---|
| 1st place, gold medalist(s) | Italy Wilfried Pallhuber; Johann Passler; Pieralberto Carrara; Andreas Zingerle | ITA | 0+0 | 1:32.18.3 |
| 2nd place, silver medalist(s) | Russia Valeriy Medvedtsev; Valeri Kiriyenko; Sergei Tarasov; Sergei Tchepikov | RUS | 0+0 | 1:32.55.0 |
| 3rd place, bronze medalist(s) | Germany Sven Fischer; Frank Luck; Mark Kirchner; Jens Steinigen | GER | 0+0 | 1:32.57.9 |

== Women's results ==
=== 15 km individual ===
| Medal | Name | Nation | Penalties | Result |
|---|---|---|---|---|
| 1st place, gold medalist(s) | Petra Schaaf | GER | 1 | 50:32.9 |
| 2nd place, silver medalist(s) | Myriam Bédard | CAN | 1 | 50:47.6 |
| 3rd place, bronze medalist(s) | Svetlana Paramygina | BLR | 3 | 52:16.6 |

=== 7.5 km sprint ===
| Medal | Name | Nation | Penalties | Result |
|---|---|---|---|---|
| 1st place, gold medalist(s) | Myriam Bédard | CAN | 0 | 21:01.9 |
| 2nd place, silver medalist(s) | Nadejda Talanova | RUS | 1 | 21:18.5 |
| 3rd place, bronze medalist(s) | Elena Belova | RUS | 1 | 21:21.7 |

=== Team event ===
| Medal | Name | Nation | Penalties | Result |
|---|---|---|---|---|
| 1st place, gold medalist(s) | France Nathalie Beausire; Delphyne Heymann; Anne Briand; Corinne Niogret | FRA | 1+0+1+1 | 53:58.1 |
| 2nd place, silver medalist(s) | Belarus Natalia Permiakova; Natalia Sulzheva; Natalia Ryzhenkova; Svetlana Paramygina | BLR | 2+2+0+0 | 54:00.5 |
| 3rd place, bronze medalist(s) | Poland Zofia Kiełpińska; Krystyna Liberda; Anna Stera; Helena Mikołajczyk | POL | 0+0+0+4 | 55:30.4 |

=== 4 × 7.5 km relay ===
| Medal | Name | Nation | Penalties | Result |
|---|---|---|---|---|
| 1st place, gold medalist(s) | Czech Republic Jana Kulhavá; Jiřina Adamičková; Iveta Knížková; Eva Háková | CZE | 0+1 | 1:52.08.6 |
| 2nd place, silver medalist(s) | France Corinne Niogret; Véronique Claudel; Delphyne Heymann; Anne Briand | FRA | 1+0 | 1:52.56.2 |
| 3rd place, bronze medalist(s) | Russia Svetlana Paniutina; Nadejda Talanova; Olga Simushina; Elena Belova | RUS | 0+1 | 1:52.58.9 |

== Medal table ==
| Place | Nation | 1st place, gold medalist(s) | 2nd place, silver medalist(s) | 3rd place, bronze medalist(s) | Total |
|---|---|---|---|---|---|
| 1 | Germany | 3 | 0 | 1 | 4 |
| 2 | Italy | 2 | 0 | 0 | 2 |
| 3 | France | 1 | 1 | 1 | 3 |
| 4 | Canada | 1 | 1 | 0 | 2 |
| 5 | Czech Republic | 1 | 0 | 0 | 1 |
| 6 | Russia | 0 | 4 | 4 | 8 |
| 7 | Belarus | 0 | 1 | 1 | 2 |
| 8 | Norway | 0 | 1 | 0 | 1 |
| 9 | Poland | 0 | 0 | 1 | 1 |
