= Biathlon World Championships 1990 =

Sports competition in Minsk, Oslo, and Kontiolahti

The 25th Biathlon World Championships were held in 1990 for the third time in Minsk, Byelorussian SSR, Soviet Union (present-day Belarus), in Oslo, Norway and in Kontiolahti, Finland. Due to unconducive weather conditions during the season it was only possible to hold the individual competitions in Minsk. The sprints, the women's relay and team events were held in Oslo and the men's relay was finally held in Kontiolahti.

== Men's results ==
=== 20 km individual ===
Medal	Name	Nation	Penalties	Result
1st place, gold medalist(s)	Valeriy Medvedtsev	URS	0	1:06:39.7
2nd place, silver medalist(s)	Sergei Tchepikov	URS	0	1:07:03.0
3rd place, bronze medalist(s)	Anatoliy Zdanovich	URS	0	1:08:39.2

=== 10 km sprint ===
Medal	Name	Nation	Penalties	Result
1st place, gold medalist(s)	Mark Kirchner	GDR	0	25:48.9
2nd place, silver medalist(s)	Eirik Kvalfoss	NOR	2	25:59.8
3rd place, bronze medalist(s)	Sergei Tchepikov	URS	2	26:20.9

=== Team event ===
Medal	Name	Nation	Penalties	Result
1st place, gold medalist(s)	East Germany Raik Dittrich; Mark Kirchner; Birk Anders; Frank Luck	GDR	1	1:04:24.1
2nd place, silver medalist(s)	Czechoslovakia Tomáš Kos; Ivan Masařík; Jiří Holubec; Jan Matouš	CZE	1	1:04:36.5
3rd place, bronze medalist(s)	France Christian Dumont; Stéphane Bouthiaux; Hervé Flandin; Thierry Gerbier	FRA	3	1:05:14.2

=== 4 × 7.5 km relay ===
Medal	Name	Nation	Penalties	Result
1st place, gold medalist(s)	Italy Pieralberto Carrara; Wilfried Pallhuber; Johann Passler; Andreas Zingerle	ITA	1	1:30:54.7
2nd place, silver medalist(s)	France Christian Dumont; Xavier Blond; Hervé Flandin; Thierry Gerbier	FRA	0	1:31:08.8
3rd place, bronze medalist(s)	East Germany Frank Luck; André Sehmisch; Mark Kirchner; Birk Anders	GDR	0	1:34:02.2

== Women's results ==
=== 15 km individual ===
Medal	Name	Nation	Penalties	Result
1st place, gold medalist(s)	Svetlana Davidova	URS	2	1:06:11.2
2nd place, silver medalist(s)	Elena Golovina	URS	3	1:06:31.6
3rd place, bronze medalist(s)	Petra Schaaf	FRG	3	1:07:25.2

=== 7.5 km sprint ===
Medal	Name	Nation	Penalties	Result
1st place, gold medalist(s)	Anne Elvebakk	NOR	2	51:53.4
2nd place, silver medalist(s)	Svetlana Davidova	URS	3	+ 1:54.8
3rd place, bronze medalist(s)	Elin Kristiansen	NOR	1	+ 2:01.2

=== Team event ===
Medal	Name	Nation	Penalties	Result
1st place, gold medalist(s)	Soviet Union Elena Batsevich; Elena Golovina; Svetlana Paramygina; Svetlana Davidova	URS	11	56:30.3
2nd place, silver medalist(s)	West Germany Irene Schroll; Daniela Hörburger; Inga Kesper; Petra Schaaf	FRG	33	1:01:18.3
3rd place, bronze medalist(s)	Bulgaria Nadezda Aleksieva; Iva Schkodreva; Maria Manolova; Zvetana Krasteva	BUL	54	1:02:09.4

=== 3 × 7.5 km relay ===
Medal	Name	Nation	Penalties	Result
1st place, gold medalist(s)	Soviet Union Elena Batsevich; Elena Golovina; Svetlana Davidova	URS	0	1:33:14.1
2nd place, silver medalist(s)	Norway Grete Ingeborg Nykkelmo; Anne Elvebakk; Elin Kristiansen	NOR	2	1:34:28.0
3rd place, bronze medalist(s)	Finland Tuija Vuoksiala; Seija Hyytiäinen; Pirjo Mattila	FIN	2	1:35:12.9

== Medal table ==
Place	Nation	1st place, gold medalist(s)	2nd place, silver medalist(s)	3rd place, bronze medalist(s)	Total
1	Soviet Union	4	3	2	9
2	East Germany	2	0	1	3
3	Norway	1	2	1	4
4	Italy	1	0	0	1
5	West Germany	0	1	1	2
5	France	0	1	1	2
7	Czechoslovakia	0	1	0	1
8	Bulgaria	0	0	1	1
8	Finland	0	0	1	1
