= Biathlon World Championships 1985 =

21st edition of the Biathlon World Championships

- Host city: Ruhpolding, Bavaria (men); Egg am Etzel, Schwyz (women)
- Country: West Germany (men); Switzerland (women)
- Events: 6
- Opening: 12 February 1985 (men); 17 February 1985 (women)
- Closing: 20 February 1985 (men); 25 February 1985 (women)

The 21st Biathlon World Championships for men were held in 1985 for the second time in Ruhpolding, in the then West Germany. The 2nd women's world championships were held in Egg am Etzel, Switzerland.

== Men's results ==
=== 20 km individual ===
Medal	Name	Nation	Penalties	Result
1st place, gold medalist(s)	Juri Kashkarov	URS	0	57:50.3
2nd place, silver medalist(s)	Frank-Peter Roetsch	GDR	2	+ 1:28.3
3rd place, bronze medalist(s)	Tapio Piipponen	FIN	0	+ 1:54.7

=== 10 km sprint ===
Medal	Name	Nation	Penalties	Result
1st place, gold medalist(s)	Frank-Peter Roetsch	GDR	1	30:25.2
2nd place, silver medalist(s)	Eirik Kvalfoss	NOR	1	+ 50.9
3rd place, bronze medalist(s)	Johann Passler	ITA	0	+ 1:08.5

=== 4 × 7.5 km relay ===
Medal	Name	Nation	Penalties	Result
1st place, gold medalist(s)	Soviet Union Juri Kashkarov; Algimantas Šalna; Sergei Bulygin; Andrei Senkov	URS		1:33:12.7
2nd place, silver medalist(s)	East Germany Frank-Peter Roetsch; Matthias Jacob; Ralf Göthel; André Sehmisch	GDR		+ 1:44.8
3rd place, bronze medalist(s)	West Germany Peter Angerer; Walter Pichler; Fritz Fischer; Herbert Fritzenwenger	FRG		+ 2:32.2

== Women's results ==
=== 10 km individual ===
Medal	Name	Nation	Penalties	Result
1st place, gold medalist(s)	Kaija Parve	URS	4	43:21.4
2nd place, silver medalist(s)	Sanna Grønlid	NOR	4	+ 59.4
3rd place, bronze medalist(s)	Eva Korpela	SWE	2	+ 1:19.1

=== 5 km sprint ===
Medal	Name	Nation	Penalties	Result
1st place, gold medalist(s)	Sanna Grønlid	NOR	0	21:58.9
2nd place, silver medalist(s)	Kaija Parve	URS	3	+ 4.8
3rd place, bronze medalist(s)	Venera Chernyshova	URS	3	+ 53.4

=== 3 × 5 km relay ===
Medal	Name	Nation	Penalties	Result
1st place, gold medalist(s)	Soviet Union Venera Chernyshova; Elena Golovina; Kaija Parve	URS	1:23:43.7	
2nd place, silver medalist(s)	Norway Sanna Grønlid; Gry Østvik; Siv Bråten	NOR	1:23:51.4	
3rd place, bronze medalist(s)	Finland Pirjo Mattila; Teija Nieminen; Tuula Ylinen	FIN	1:24,00.0	

== Medal table ==
Place	Nation	1st place, gold medalist(s)	2nd place, silver medalist(s)	3rd place, bronze medalist(s)	Total
1	Soviet Union	4	1	1	6
2	Norway	1	3	0	4
3	East Germany	1	2	0	3
4	Finland	0	0	2	2
5	West Germany	0	0	1	1
5	Italy	0	0	1	1
5	Sweden	0	0	1	1
