= Pirjo Aalto =

Finnish biathlete

Personal information
- Nationality: Finnish
- Born: 19 February 1961 (age 64); Huittinen, Finland

Sport
- Sport: Biathlon

Pirjo Hannele Aalto (born 19 February 1961) is a Finnish biathlete. She competed in women's sprint event at the 1994 Winter Olympics.
