= Steffen Hoos =

German biathlete

Personal information
- Nationality: German
- Born: 29 January 1968 (age 57); Tambach-Dietharz, East Germany

Sport
- Sport: Biathlon

Steffen Hoos (born 29 January 1968) is a German former biathlete. He competed in the men's 20 km individual event at the 1992 Winter Olympics.
