= Biathlon World Championships 1991 =

Sports competition in Lahti, Finland

- Host city: Lahti
- Country: Finland
- Events: 8
- Opening: 19 February 1991
- Closing: 24 February 1991

The 26th Biathlon World Championships were held in 1991 for the second time in Lahti, Finland.

== Men's results ==
=== 20 km individual ===
Date: February 24, 1991

Medal	Name	Nation	Penalties	Result
1st place, gold medalist(s)	Mark Kirchner	GER	2	1:03:05.7
2nd place, silver medalist(s)	Alexandr Popov	URS	1	1:03:33.1
3rd place, bronze medalist(s)	Eirik Kvalfoss	NOR	2	1:03:38.3

=== 10 km sprint ===
Date: February 19, 1991

Medal	Name	Nation	Penalties	Result
1st place, gold medalist(s)	Mark Kirchner	GER	0	30:48.1
2nd place, silver medalist(s)	Frank Luck	GER	1	31:12.8
3rd place, bronze medalist(s)	Eirik Kvalfoss	NOR	2	31:27.9

=== Team event ===
Date: February 21, 1991

Medal	Name	Nation	Penalties	Result
1st place, gold medalist(s)	Italy Hubert Leitgeb; Gottlieb Taschler; Simon Demetz; Wilfried Pallhuber	ITA	0	1:00:59.8
2nd place, silver medalist(s)	Norway Sverre Istad; Jon Åge Tyldum; Ivar Michal Ulekleiv; Frode Løberg	NOR	1	1:01:14.0
3rd place, bronze medalist(s)	Soviet Union Anatoliy Zdanovich; Sergei Tarasov; Sergei Tchepikov; Valeriy Medvedtsev	URS	3	1:01:40.8

=== 4 × 7.5 km relay ===
Date: February 23, 1991

Medal	Name	Nation	Penalties	Result
1st place, gold medalist(s)	Germany Ricco Groß; Frank Luck; Mark Kirchner; Fritz Fischer	GER	0	1:33:33.5
2nd place, silver medalist(s)	Soviet Union Juri Kashkarov; Alexandr Popov; Sergei Tarasov; Sergei Tchepikov	URS	0	1:35:01.3
3rd place, bronze medalist(s)	Norway Geir Einang; Eirik Kvalfoss; Jon Åge Tyldum; Gisle Fenne	NOR	0	1:35:08.3

== Women's results ==
=== 15 km individual ===
Date: February 24, 1991

Medal	Name	Nation	Penalties	Result
1st place, gold medalist(s)	Petra Schaaf	GER	0	55:14.9
2nd place, silver medalist(s)	Grete I. Nykkelmo	NOR	4	57:13.4
3rd place, bronze medalist(s)	Iva Shkodreva	BUL	1	57:43.3

=== 7.5 km sprint ===
Date: February 19, 1991

Medal	Name	Nation	Penalties	Result
1st place, gold medalist(s)	Grete I. Nykkelmo	NOR	2	30:01.9
2nd place, silver medalist(s)	Svetlana Davidova	URS	3	30:32.7
3rd place, bronze medalist(s)	Elena Golovina	URS	1	30:35.1

=== Team event ===
Date: February 21, 1991

Medal	Name	Nation	Penalties	Result
1st place, gold medalist(s)	Soviet Union Yelena Belova; Elena Golovina; Svetlana Paramygina; Svetlana Davidova	URS	20+11	59:08.1
2nd place, silver medalist(s)	Bulgaria Maria Manolova; Silvana Blagoeva; Nadezda Aleksieva; Iva Shkodreva	BUL	1+11	59:23.1
3rd place, bronze medalist(s)	Norway Synnøve Thoresen; Signe Trosten; Hildegunn Fossen; Unni Kristiansen	NOR	11+2	59:53.2

=== 3 × 7.5 km relay ===
Date: February 23, 1991

Medal	Name	Nation	Penalties	Result
1st place, gold medalist(s)	Soviet Union Yelena Belova; Elena Golovina; Svetlana Davidova	URS	0+2	1:24:54.3
2nd place, silver medalist(s)	Norway Grete I. Nykkelmo; Anne Elvebakk; Elin Kristiansen	NOR	0+2	1:25:52.0
3rd place, bronze medalist(s)	Germany Uschi Disl; Kerstin Möring; Antje Misersky	GER	0+7	1:28:15.9

== Medal table ==
Place	Nation	1st place, gold medalist(s)	2nd place, silver medalist(s)	3rd place, bronze medalist(s)	Total
1	Germany	4	1	1	6
2	Soviet Union	2	3	2	7
3	Norway	1	3	4	8
4	Italy	1	0	0	1
5	Bulgaria	0	1	1	2
