= Biathlon at the 1988 Winter Olympics =

Biathlon at the XV Olympic Winter Games
- Venue: Canmore Nordic Centre
- Dates: 20–26 February
- No. of events: 3
- Competitors: 90 from 22 nations

Biathlon at the 1988 Winter Olympics consisted of three biathlon events. They were held at the Canmore Nordic Centre, about 100 kilometres from the host city of Calgary. The events began on 20 February and ended on 26 February 1988.

== Medal summary ==
Four nations won medals in biathlon, East Germany leading the medal table with two gold medals, and the Soviet Union winning the most medals with 4 (1 gold, 2 silver, 1 bronze). Frank-Peter Roetsch won both individual gold medals, while Valeriy Medvedtsev won three medals, two silvers in the individual events and gold in the relay.

Italy's two medals were the first in biathlon for the country.

=== Medal table ===
Rank	Nation	Gold	Silver	Bronze	Total
1	East Germany	2	0	0	2
2	Soviet Union	1	2	1	4
3	West Germany	0	1	0	1
4	Italy	0	0	2	2
Totals (4 entries)		3	3	3	9

=== Events ===
Event	Gold		Silver		Bronze	
Individual	Frank-Peter Roetsch; East Germany	56:33.3	Valeriy Medvedtsev; Soviet Union	56:54.6	Johann Passler; Italy	57:10.1
Sprint	Frank-Peter Roetsch; East Germany	25:08.1	Valeriy Medvedtsev; Soviet Union	25:23.7	Sergei Tchepikov; Soviet Union	25:29.4
Relay	Soviet Union; Dmitry Vasilyev; Sergei Tchepikov; Aleksandr Popov; Valeriy Medvedtsev	1:22:30.0	West Germany; Ernst Reiter; Stefan Höck; Peter Angerer; Fritz Fischer	1:23:37.4	Italy; Werner Kiem; Gottlieb Taschler; Johann Passler; Andreas Zingerle	1:23:51.5

== Participating nations ==
Twenty-two nations sent biathletes to compete in the events. Below is a list of the competing nations; in parentheses are the number of national competitors. Guam and Puerto Rico sent biathletes to the Olympics for the first (and as of 2024, only) time.

- Argentina (3)
- Australia (1)
- Austria (5)
- Bulgaria (5)
- Canada (5)
- Finland (5)
- France (7)
- West Germany (5)
- Great Britain (4)
- East Germany (6)
- Guam (1)
- Hungary (1)
- Italy (6)
- Japan (4)
- South Korea (5)
- Norway (6)
- Puerto Rico (1)
- Sweden (4)
- Czechoslovakia (5)
- Soviet Union (5)
- United States (5)
- Yugoslavia (1)
