= Biathlon World Championships 1989 =

Sports competition in Feistritz, Austria

- Host city: Feistritz an der Drau, Carinthia
- Country: Austria
- Events: 8
- Opening: 7 February 1989
- Closing: 12 February 1989

The 24th Biathlon World Championships were held in 1989 in Feistritz, Austria. These world championships were the first to hold the men's and women's championships simultaneously.

== Men's results ==
=== 20 km individual ===
Medal	Name	Nation	Penalties	Result
1st place, gold medalist(s)	Eirik Kvalfoss	NOR	1	58:13.0
2nd place, silver medalist(s)	Gisle Fenne	NOR	0	59:20.8
3rd place, bronze medalist(s)	Fritz Fischer	FRG	2	1:00:48.1

=== 10 km sprint ===
Medal	Name	Nation	Penalties	Result
1st place, gold medalist(s)	Frank Luck	GDR	0	28:08.7
2nd place, silver medalist(s)	Eirik Kvalfoss	NOR	1	28:14.1
3rd place, bronze medalist(s)	Juri Kashkarov	URS	1	28:32.7

=== Team event ===
Medal	Name	Nation	Penalties	Result
1st place, gold medalist(s)	Soviet Union Juri Kashkarov; Sergei Bulygin; Alexandr Popov; Sergei Tchepikov	URS	1	59:36.9
2nd place, silver medalist(s)	West Germany Franz Wudy; Herbert Fritzenwenger; Georg Fischer; Fritz Fischer	FRG	2	59:44.2
3rd place, bronze medalist(s)	East Germany Andreas Heymann; André Sehmisch; Raik Dittrich; Steffen Hoos	GDR	1	1:01:27.1

=== 4 × 7.5 km relay ===
Medal	Name	Nation	Penalties	Result
1st place, gold medalist(s)	East Germany Frank Luck; André Sehmisch; Birk Anders; Frank-Peter Roetsch	GDR		
2nd place, silver medalist(s)	Soviet Union Juri Kashkarov; Sergei Tchepikov; Alexandr Popov; Sergei Bulygin	URS		
3rd place, bronze medalist(s)	Norway Geir Einang; Sylfest Glimsdal; Gisle Fenne; Eirik Kvalfoss	NOR		

== Women's results ==
=== 15 km individual ===
This marked the first time that the women's individual event was held over 15 km in the World Championships.

Medal	Name	Nation	Penalties	Result
1st place, gold medalist(s)	Petra Schaaf	FRG	2	1:06:11.2
2nd place, silver medalist(s)	Anne Elvebakk	NOR	3	1:06:31.6
3rd place, bronze medalist(s)	Svetlana Davidova	URS	3	1:07:25.2

=== 7.5 km sprint ===
This marked the first time that the women's sprint event was held over 7.5 km in the World Championships.

Medal	Name	Nation	Penalties	Result
1st place, gold medalist(s)	Anne Elvebakk	NOR	2	27:12.3
2nd place, silver medalist(s)	Zvetana Krasteva	BUL	2	27:15.4
3rd place, bronze medalist(s)	Natalia Prikazchikova	URS	3	27:24.8

=== Team event ===
Medal	Name	Nation	Penalties	Result
1st place, gold medalist(s)	Soviet Union Natalia Prikazchikova; Svetlana Davidova; Luisa Zherepenova; Elena Golovina	URS	13	1:05:38.8
2nd place, silver medalist(s)	Norway Synnøve Thoresen; Elin Kristiansen; Anne Elvebakk; Mona Bollerud	NOR	13	1:07:48.0
3rd place, bronze medalist(s)	West Germany Inga Kesper; Daniela Hörburger; Dorina Pieper; Petra Schaaf	FRG	11	1:07:54.1

=== 3 × 7.5 km relay ===
Medal	Name	Nation	Penalties	Result
1st place, gold medalist(s)	Soviet Union Natalia Prikazchikova; Svetlana Davidova; Elena Golovina	URS	0	1:23:15.5
2nd place, silver medalist(s)	Bulgaria Zvetana Krasteva; Maria Manolova; Nadezhda Aleksieva	BUL	0	1:25:29.9
3rd place, bronze medalist(s)	Czechoslovakia Eva Burešová; Renata Novotná; Jiřina Adamičková	TCH	0	1:26:07.5

== Medal table ==
Place	Nation	1st place, gold medalist(s)	2nd place, silver medalist(s)	3rd place, bronze medalist(s)	Total
1	Soviet Union	3	1	3	7
2	Norway	2	4	1	7
3	East Germany	2	0	1	3
4	West Germany	1	1	2	4
5	Bulgaria	0	2	0	2
6	Czechoslovakia	0	0	1	1
