= Biathlon World Championships 1987 =

Sports competition in Lake Placid, New York

- Host city: Lahti (women); Lake Placid, New York (men)
- Country: Finland (women); USA (men)
- Events: 6
- Opening: 14 February 1987 (men); 15 February 1987 (women)
- Closing: 27 February 1987 (men); 28 February 1987 (women)

The 23rd Biathlon World Championships for men were held in 1987 for the second time in Lake Placid, New York, United States. The 4th women's world championships were held in Lahti, Finland.

== Men's results ==
=== 20 km individual ===
| Medal | Name | Nation | Penalties | Result |
|---|---|---|---|---|
| 1st place, gold medalist(s) | Frank-Peter Roetsch | GDR | 1 | 1:00:00.4 |
| 2nd place, silver medalist(s) | Josh Thompson | USA | 1 | 1:00:51.0 |
| 3rd place, bronze medalist(s) | Jan Matouš | CZE | 0 | 1:01:15.3 |

=== 10 km sprint ===
| Medal | Name | Nation | Penalties | Result |
|---|---|---|---|---|
| 1st place, gold medalist(s) | Frank-Peter Roetsch | GDR | 1 | 29:49.6 |
| 2nd place, silver medalist(s) | Matthias Jacob | GDR | 2 | 30:38.8 |
| 3rd place, bronze medalist(s) | André Sehmisch | GDR | 2 | 30:55.4 |

=== 4 × 7.5 km relay ===
| Medal | Name | Nation | Penalties | Result |
|---|---|---|---|---|
| 1st place, gold medalist(s) | East Germany Frank-Peter Roetsch; Matthias Jacob; André Sehmisch; Jürgen Wirth | GDR | | |
| 2nd place, silver medalist(s) | Soviet Union Dmitry Vasilyev; Juri Kashkarov; Alexandr Popov; Valeriy Medvedtsev | URS | | |
| 3rd place, bronze medalist(s) | West Germany Ernst Reiter; Herbert Fritzenwenger; Peter Angerer; Fritz Fischer | FRG | | |

== Women's results ==
=== 10 km individual ===
| Medal | Name | Nation | Penalties | Result |
|---|---|---|---|---|
| 1st place, gold medalist(s) | Sanna Grønlid | NOR | 2 | 42:42.8 |
| 2nd place, silver medalist(s) | Kaija Parve | URS | 2 | + 48.3 |
| 3rd place, bronze medalist(s) | Tuija Vuoksiala | FIN | 2 | + 2:14.0 |

=== 5 km sprint ===
| Medal | Name | Nation | Penalties | Result |
|---|---|---|---|---|
| 1st place, gold medalist(s) | Elena Golovina | URS | 0 | 21:14.7 |
| 2nd place, silver medalist(s) | Venera Chernyshova | URS | 1 | + 37.2 |
| 3rd place, bronze medalist(s) | Anne Elvebakk | NOR | 2 | + 57.4 |

=== 3 × 5 km relay ===
| Medal | Name | Nation | Penalties | Result |
|---|---|---|---|---|
| 1st place, gold medalist(s) | Soviet Union Elena Golovina; Venera Chernyshova; Kaija Parve | URS | | |
| 2nd place, silver medalist(s) | Sweden Inger Björkbom; Mia Stadig; Eva Korpela | SWE | | |
| 3rd place, bronze medalist(s) | Norway Anne Elvebakk; Sanna Grønlid; Siv Bråten | NOR | | |

== Medal table ==
| Place | Nation | 1st place, gold medalist(s) | 2nd place, silver medalist(s) | 3rd place, bronze medalist(s) | Total |
|---|---|---|---|---|---|
| 1 | East Germany | 3 | 1 | 1 | 5 |
| 2 | Soviet Union | 2 | 3 | 0 | 5 |
| 3 | Norway | 1 | 0 | 2 | 3 |
| 4 | United States | 0 | 1 | 0 | 1 |
| 4 | Sweden | 0 | 1 | 0 | 1 |
| 6 | Finland | 0 | 0 | 1 | 1 |
| 6 | West Germany | 0 | 0 | 1 | 1 |
| 6 | Czechoslovakia | 0 | 0 | 1 | 1 |
