= Biathlon at the 1992 Winter Olympics =

Biathlon at the XVI Olympic Winter Games
- Venue: Les Saisies
- Dates: 11–20 February
- No. of events: 6
- Competitors: 196 from 28 nations

Biathlon at the 1992 Winter Olympics consisted of six biathlon events. They were held at Les Saisies, about 40 kilometres from the host city of Albertville. The events began on 11 February and ended on 20 February 1992. The 1992 Games were the first in which women competed in biathlon.

Russian biathlete Sergei Tarasov admitted in 2015 that the EUN (former Soviet nations competing in a unified team) biathlon team had carried out illegal blood transfusions at the Games. Something went very wrong with his transfusion, and he was rushed to hospital where they saved his life.

== Medal summary ==
Six nations won medals in biathlon, Germany leading the medal table with seven (3 gold, 4 silver). The Unified Team and Sweden were the only other team to win more than two medals. Mark Kirchner led the individual medal table with two golds and three medals total, while Antje Misersky also won three medals, one gold and two silver.

France's gold medal in the relay was the country's first medal of any type in the sport. Canada's bronze, won by Myriam Bédard, was the first medal won by an athlete from outside Europe or the former Soviet Union.

=== Medal table ===
Rank	Nation	Gold	Silver	Bronze	Total
1	Germany	3	4	0	7
2	Unified Team	2	2	2	6
3	France	1	0	0	1
4	Sweden	0	0	2	2
5	Canada	0	0	1	1
5	Finland	0	0	1	1
Totals (6 entries)		6	6	6	18

=== Men's events ===
Event	Gold		Silver		Bronze	
Individual	Yevgeniy Redkin; Unified Team	57:34.4	Mark Kirchner; Germany	57:40.8	Mikael Löfgren; Sweden	57:59.4
Sprint	Mark Kirchner; Germany	26:02.3	Ricco Groß; Germany	26:18.0	Harri Eloranta; Finland	26:26.0
Relay	Germany; Ricco Groß; Jens Steinigen; Mark Kirchner; Fritz Fischer	1:24:43.5	Unified Team; Valeriy Medvedtsev; Aleksandr Popov; Valery Kiriyenko; Sergei Tchepikov	1:25:06.3	Sweden; Ulf Johansson; Leif Andersson; Tord Wiksten; Mikael Löfgren	1:25:38.2

=== Women's events ===
Event	Gold		Silver		Bronze	
Individual	Antje Misersky; Germany	51:47.2	Svetlana Pechorskaya; Unified Team	51:58.5	Myriam Bédard; Canada	52:15.0
Sprint	Anfisa Reztsova; Unified Team	24:29.2	Antje Misersky; Germany	24:45.1	Yelena Belova; Unified Team	24:50.8
Relay	France; Corinne Niogret; Véronique Claudel; Anne Briand-Bouthiaux	1:15:55.6	Germany; Uschi Disl; Antje Misersky; Petra Schaaf	1:16:18.4	Unified Team; Yelena Belova; Anfisa Reztsova; Yelena Melnikova	1:16:54.6

== Participating nations ==
Twenty-eight nations sent biathletes to compete in the events. Below is a list of the competing nations; in parentheses are the number of national competitors. Three former Soviet republics (Estonia, Latvia and Lithuania), made their biathlon debuts, along with Slovenia and Greece. The Unified Team also made its only appearance.

- Argentina (7)
- Australia (2)
- Austria (5)
- Bulgaria (10)
- Canada (9)
- China (8)
- Estonia (8)
- Unified Team (11)
- Finland (9)
- France (10)
- Great Britain (5)
- Germany (10)
- Greece (2)
- Hungary (9)
- Italy (10)
- Japan (3)
- South Korea (4)
- Latvia (4)
- Lithuania (2)
- Norway (12)
- Poland (9)
- Romania (6)
- Slovenia (5)
- Switzerland (1)
- Sweden (10)
- Czechoslovakia (10)
- United States (11)
- Yugoslavia (4)

== See also ==
- Biathlon at the 1992 Winter Paralympics
