= Biathlon at the 1980 Winter Olympics – Sprint =

Men's biathlon sprint at the XIII Olympic Winter Games
- Venue: Lake Placid Olympic Sports Complex Cross Country Biathlon Center
- Dates: 19 February 1980
- Competitors: 50 from 18 nations
- Winning time: 32:10.69

Medalists
1st place, gold medalist(s)		Frank Ullrich	East Germany
2nd place, silver medalist(s)		Vladimir Alikin	Soviet Union
3rd place, bronze medalist(s)		Anatoly Alyabyev	Soviet Union

The men's 10 kilometre sprint biathlon competition at the 1980 Winter Olympics was held on 19 February, at Lake Placid Olympic Sports Complex Cross Country Biathlon Center. In sprint, competitors race over three loops of the skiing course, shooting two times, once prone and once standing, with each miss being penalized by requiring the competitor to race over a 150-metre penalty loop.

== Results ==
The sprint was added to the world championships in 1974, and made its Olympic debut in Lake Placid. Two-time defending world champion Frank Ullrich was more than 10 seconds clear after the first shoot, and despite two misses at the second shoot, he actually saw his lead increase, allowing him to pull away in the final section and win by more than 40 seconds. Vladimir Alikin, Kjell Søbak, Erkki Antila and Anatoly Alyabyev were closely matched after the first shoot, but Alikin, who shot clear, and Alyabyev, who missed once, pulled clear for silver and bronze, while Antila missed two shots and Søbak fell off the skiing pace.

Rank	Bib	Name	Country	Time	Penalties	Deficit
1st place, gold medalist(s)	29	Frank Ullrich	East Germany	32:10.69	2 (0+2)	–
2nd place, silver medalist(s)	7	Vladimir Alikin	Soviet Union	32:53.10	0 (0+0)	+42.41
3rd place, bronze medalist(s)	42	Anatoly Alyabyev	Soviet Union	33:09.16	1 (0+1)	+58.47
4	11	Klaus Siebert	East Germany	33:32.76	2 (1+1)	+1:22.07
5	3	Kjell Søbak	Norway	33:34.64	1 (0+1)	+1:23.95
6	40	Peter Zelinka	Czechoslovakia	33:45.20	1 (0+1)	+1:34.51
7	36	Odd Lirhus	Norway	34:10.39	2 (1+1)	+1:59.70
8	41	Peter Angerer	West Germany	34:13.43	4 (2+2)	+2:02.74
9	28	Aleksandr Tikhonov	Soviet Union	34:14.88	2 (0+2)	+2:04.19
10	20	Gerd Winkler	West Germany	34:24.16	1 (1+0)	+2:13.47
11	15	Franz-Josef Weber	Austria	34:25.28	1 (0+1)	+2:14.59
12	46	Erkki Antila	Finland	34:32.97	2 (0+2)	+2:22.28
13	24	Christian Poirot	France	34:38.60	1 (0+1)	+2:27.91
14	8	Sören Wikström	Sweden	34:57.01	2 (1+1)	+2:46.32
15	27	Ronnie Adolfsson	Sweden	35:14.87	3 (0+3)	+3:04.18
16	1	Jaromír Šimůnek	Czechoslovakia	35:15.12	2 (0+2)	+3:04.43
17	33	Terje Krokstad	Norway	35:15.40	4 (1+3)	+3:04.71
18	37	Luigi Weiss	Italy	35:37.72	3 (0+3)	+3:27.03
19	31	Lyle Nelson	United States	35:40.56	2 (1+1)	+3:29.87
20	2	Keith Oliver	Great Britain	35:45.89	2 (1+1)	+3:35.20
21	49	Mathias Jung	East Germany	35:50.36	4 (1+3)	+3:39.67
22	43	Per Andersson	Sweden	35:55.57	2 (1+1)	+3:44.88
23	34	Alfred Eder	Austria	35:58.27	4 (0+4)	+3:47.58
24	9	Arto Sutinen	Finland	36:01.06	3 (2+1)	+3:50.37
25	16	Adriano Darioli	Italy	36:14.17	5 (1+4)	+4:03.48
26	30	Hiroyuki Deguchi	Japan	36:14.61	2 (1+1)	+4:03.92
27	5	Fritz Fischer	West Germany	36:29.87	4 (2+2)	+4:19.18
28	32	Rudolf Horn	Austria	36:31.25	5 (1+4)	+4:20.56
29	18	Zdeněk Hák	Czechoslovakia	36:32.59	6 (3+3)	+4:21.90
30	25	Urs Brechbühl	Switzerland	36:32.66	4 (2+2)	+4:21.97
31	13	Arduino Tiraboschi	Italy	36:39.98	3 (1+2)	+4:29.29
32	44	Roland Burn	Switzerland	36:52.35	5 (1+4)	+4:41.66
33	35	Yvon Mougel	France	36:57.43	6 (2+4)	+4:46.74
34	45	Vladimir Velichkov	Bulgaria	37:10.71	5 (1+4)	+5:00.02
35	22	Keijo Kuntola	Finland	37:15.28	5 (3+2)	+5:04.59
36	19	Yuri Mitev	Bulgaria	37:23.95	4 (2+2)	+5:13.26
37	14	Takashi Shibata	Japan	37:26.91	6 (3+3)	+5:16.22
38	21	Marjan Burgar	Yugoslavia	37:37.74	4 (1+3)	+5:27.05
39	12	Yves Blondeau	France	37:44.87	8 (3+5)	+5:34.18
40	17	Jim Wood	Great Britain	38:30.09	4 (3+1)	+6:19.40
41	6	Song Yongjun	China	38:37.19	3 (0+3)	+6:26.50
42	47	Paul Gibbins	Great Britain	38:44.24	5 (2+3)	+6:33.55
43	50	Masaichi Kinoshita	Japan	38:50.19	4 (2+2)	+6:39.50
44	48	Donald Nielsen Jr.	United States	38:51.02	6 (2+4)	+6:40.33
45	10	Peter Hoag Jr.	United States	38:53.44	4 (2+2)	+6:42.75
46	38	Han Jinsuo	China	44:06.85	6 (2+4)	+11:56.16
47	23	Raúl Abella	Argentina	44:40.55	5 (2+3)	+12:29.86
48	4	Luis Ríos	Argentina	44:51.18	5 (3+2)	+12:40.49
49	39	Jorge Salas	Argentina	47:12.58	6 (2+4)	+15:01.89
	26	Li Xiaoming	China	DSQ		
