= 1983–84 Biathlon World Cup =

Biathlon competition

1983–84 World Cup
Discipline	Men	Women
Overall	(East Germany) Frank-Peter Roetsch	

Competition

The 1983–84 Biathlon World Cup was a multi-race tournament over a season of biathlon, organised by the UIPMB (Union Internationale de Pentathlon Moderne et Biathlon). The season started on 6 January 1984 in Falun, Sweden, and ended on 11 March 1984 in Lygna, Norway. It was the seventh season of the Biathlon World Cup.

== Men's calendar ==
Below is the World Cup calendar for the 1983–84 season.

Location	Date	Individual	Sprint	Relay
(Sweden) Falun	6–8 January	●	●	●
(Switzerland) Pontresina	12–15 January	●	●	●
(West Germany) Ruhpolding	19–22 January	●	●	●
(Socialist Federal Republic of Yugoslavia) Sarajevo	11–17 February	●	●	●
(East Germany) Oberhof	1–4 March	●	●	●
(Norway) Holmenkollen	7–10 March	●	●	●
Total		6	6	6

- 1984 Winter Olympics races were not included in the 1983–84 World Cup scoring system.

*The relays were technically unofficial races as they did not count towards anything in the World Cup.

== Women's calendar ==
Location	Date	Individual	Sprint	Relay
(Sweden) Falun	6–8 January	●	●	●
(West Germany) Ruhpolding	19–22 February	●	●	●
(France) Chamonix	29 February – 4 March	●	●	●
(Norway) Lygna	10–12 March	●	●	●
Total		4	4	4

*The relays were technically unofficial races as they did not count towards anything in the World Cup.

== World Cup Podium ==
=== Men ===
Stage	Date	Place	Discipline	Winner	Second	Third	Yellow bib (After competition)	Det.
1	6 January 1984	(Sweden) Falun	20 km Individual	(Norway) Odd Lirhus	(France) Yvon Mougel	(Finland) Tapio Piipponen	(Norway) Odd Lirhus	
1	7 January 1984	(Sweden) Falun	10 km Sprint	(Soviet Union) Algimantas Šalna	(Finland) Risto Punkka	(Norway) Eirik Kvalfoss	(Norway) Eirik Kvalfoss	
2	12 January 1984	(Switzerland) Pontresina	20 km Individual	(West Germany) Fritz Fischer	(East Germany) Frank-Peter Roetsch	(East Germany) Holger Wick	(Norway) Eirik Kvalfoss	
2	14 January 1984	(Switzerland) Pontresina	10 km Sprint	(Norway) Eirik Kvalfoss	(East Germany) Frank-Peter Roetsch	(East Germany) Ralf Göthel	(Norway) Eirik Kvalfoss	
3	19 January 1984	(West Germany) Ruhpolding	20 km Individual	(West Germany) Peter Angerer	(Finland) Tapio Piipponen	(Norway) Rolf Storsveen	(Norway) Eirik Kvalfoss	
3	21 January 1984	(West Germany) Ruhpolding	10 km Sprint	(West Germany) Peter Angerer	(Norway) Terje Krokstad	(East Germany) Frank-Peter Roetsch	(East Germany) Frank-Peter Roetsch	
4	1 March 1984	(East Germany) Oberhof	20 km Individual	(Soviet Union) Juri Kashkarov	(East Germany) Frank-Peter Roetsch	(Soviet Union) Dmitry Vasilyev	(East Germany) Frank-Peter Roetsch	
4	3 March 1984	(East Germany) Oberhof	10 km Sprint	(East Germany) Frank-Peter Roetsch	(Soviet Union) Algimantas Šalna	(West Germany) Peter Angerer	(East Germany) Frank-Peter Roetsch	
5	7 March 1984	(Norway) Oslo Holmenkollen	20 km Individual	(West Germany) Peter Angerer	(West Germany) Fritz Fischer	(Austria) Alfred Eder	(East Germany) Frank-Peter Roetsch	
5	8 March 1984	(Norway) Oslo Holmenkollen	10 km Sprint	(Norway) Eirik Kvalfoss	(West Germany) Peter Angerer	(East Germany) Frank-Peter Roetsch	(East Germany) Frank-Peter Roetsch	

=== Women ===
Stage	Date	Place	Discipline	Winner	Second	Third	Yellow bib (After competition)	Det.
1	6 January 1984	(Sweden) Falun	10 km Individual	(Norway) Gry Østvik	(Norway) Siv Bråten	(Finland) Aino Kallunki	(Norway) Gry Østvik	Detail
1	7 January 1984	(Sweden) Falun	5 km Sprint	(Finland) Aino Kallunki	(Sweden) Annette Bouvin	(Norway) Sanna Grønlid	(Norway) Gry Østvik	Detail
2	19 January 1984	(West Germany) Ruhpolding	10 km Individual	(Norway) Mette Mestad	(Norway) Siv Bråten	(Norway) Sanna Grønlid	(Norway) Mette Mestad	Detail
2	21 January 1984	(West Germany) Ruhpolding	5 km Sprint	(Norway) Gry Østvik	(Norway) Mette Mestad	(Norway) Siv Bråten	(Norway) Mette Mestad	Detail
WC	29 February 1984	(France) Chamonix	10 km Individual	(Soviet Union) Venera Chernyshova	(Soviet Union) Lyudmila Zabolotnaia	(Soviet Union) Tatiana Brylina	(Norway) Mette Mestad	Detail
WC	3 March 1984	(France) Chamonix	5 km Sprint	(Soviet Union) Venera Chernyshova	(Norway) Sanna Grønlid	(Austria) Andrea Grossegger	(Norway) Mette Mestad	Detail
3	7 March 1984	(Norway) Lygna	10 km Individual	(Norway) Sanna Grønlid	(Norway) Siv Bråten	(Norway) Gry Østvik	(Norway) Mette Mestad	Detail
3	8 March 1984	(Norway) Lygna	5 km Sprint	(Sweden) Annette Bouvin	(Sweden) Eva Korpela	(Norway) Mette Mestad	(Norway) Mette Mestad	Detail

== Standings: Men ==
=== Overall ===
Pos.		Points
1.	(East Germany) Frank-Peter Roetsch	139
2.	(West Germany) Peter Angerer	138
3.	(Norway) Eirik Kvalfoss	134
4.	(West Germany) Fritz Fischer	130
5.	(East Germany) Ralf Göthel	122

- Final standings after 10 races.

== Standings: Women ==
=== Overall ===
Pos.		Points
1.	(Norway) Mette Mestad	93
2.	(Norway) Sanna Grønlid	86
3.	(Norway) Gry Østvik	85
4.	(Soviet Union) Venera Chernyshova	83
5.	(Norway) Siv Bråten	82

- Final standings after 8 races.

== Achievements ==
First World/European Cup career victory

- Mette Mestad (NOR), 25, in her 2nd season — the WC 2 Individual in Ruhpolding; it also was her first podium
- Juri Kashkarov (URS), 20, in his 2nd season — the WC 4 Individual in Oberhof; it also was his first podium
- Sanna Grønlid (NOR), 24, in her 2nd season — the EC 3 Individual in Lygna; first podium was 1983–84 Sprint in Falun
- Anette Bouvin (SWE), 23, — the EC 3 Sprint in Lygna; first podium was 1983–84 Sprint in Falun

First World/European Cup podium

- Risto Punkka (FIN), 26, in his 2nd season — no. 2 in the WC 1 Sprint in Falun
- Anette Bouvin (SWE), 23, — no. 2 in the EC 1 Sprint in Falun
- Sanna Grønlid (NOR), 24, in her 2nd season — no. 3 in the EC 1 Sprint in Falun
- Holger Wick (GDR), 21, in his 3rd season — no. 3 in the WC 2 Individual in Pontresina
- Ralf Göthel (GDR), 22, in his 3rd season — no. 3 in the WC 2 Sprint in Pontresina
- Rolf Storsveen (NOR), 24, in his 3rd season — no. 3 in the WC 3 Individual in Ruhpolding
- Eva Lundgren (SWE), 25, — no. 2 in the EC 3 Sprint in Lygna

Victory in this World/European Cup (all-time number of victories in parentheses)

- Peter Angerer (FRG), 3 (4) first places
- Eirik Kvalfoss (NOR), 2 (7) first places
- Gry Østvik (NOR), 2 (3) first places
- Algimantas Šalna (URS), 1 (4) first place
- Odd Lirhus (NOR), 1 (2) first place
- Aino Kallunki (FIN), 1 (2) first place
- Fritz Fischer (FRG), 1 (2) first place
- Frank-Peter Roetsch (GDR), 1 (2) first place
- Mette Mestad (NOR), 1 (1) first place
- Juri Kashkarov (URS), 1 (1) first place
- Sanna Grønlid (NOR), 1 (1) first place
- Anette Bouvin (SWE), 1 (1) first place

== Retirements ==
Following notable biathletes retired after the 1983–84 season:

- Risto Punkka (FIN)
- Yvon Mougel (FRA)
- Frank Ullrich (GDR)
- Mathias Jung (GDR)
- Odd Lirhus (NOR)
- Svein Engen (NOR)
- Terje Krokstad (NOR)

== Notes ==
1. ^{1} ^{2} ^{3} ^{4} In the individual races in Falun some non-World Cup racers participated. In the 20 km individual Andrei Zenkov and Øivind Nerhagen, among others, were non-World Cup racers, and so for World Cup purposes Arto Jääskeläinen came 7th, and Rolf Storsveen and Kjell Søbak finished 9th and 10th respectively and received the appropriate World Cup points. In the 10 km sprint, one of the non-World Cup racers was Sergei Bulygin, and so he did not receive any World Cup points, and for World Cup purposes Algimantas Šalna won that race and received the appropriate World Cup points. Also in the European Cup races there were some non-European Cup racers participating, among those were Anita Nygård who finished 10th in the 5 km sprint. For European Cup purposes though, Siv Bråten finished 10th and received the appropriate points.
2. ^{5} The Aftenposten source says that the relay teams received a very unusual amount of penalty loops, with 12, 13, 21, 20, 25 and 25 penalty loops respectively for the first six teams. However, in the same paper, it says that the two Norwegian teams got 14 penalty loops combined, which does not add up with it saying that the "Norway I" team got 25 penalties. So those high numbers probably refers to the number of missed shots.
3. ^{6} In the individual races here some non-World Cup racers participated. Among those was Gisle Fenne, he was not a World Cup racer and so did not receive any World Cup points, and for World Cup purposes Risto Punkka came fifth and received the appropriate World Cup points.
4. The Sports Book does originally have different order of the finishers in this 10 km race with B. Mestad, Mikkola and Schill coming 8th, 9th and 10th, respectively. However it later contradicts itself by giving the points of those positions to Grønlid, B. Mestad and Anne-L. Engstrøm instead. Because that table shows how each racers score adds up, that has been given precedent.
5. ^{8} ^{9} In the individual races here some non-European Cup racers participated. Among those was Ingeborg Nordmo Krokstad in the 10 km individual, she was not a European Cup racer and so did not receive any points, and for European Cup purposes Doris Niva came 9th and received the appropriate points, with Anne L. Engstrøm finishing 10th. And in 5 km sprint Liv Høgli was also a non-European Cup racer and thus for European Cup purposes those who finished behind her moves up a spot with Doris Niva finishing 4th and Anne L. Engstrøm finishing 10th.
