= 1980–81 Biathlon World Cup =

Biathlon competition

1980–81 World Cup
Discipline	Men	Women
Overall	(East Germany) Frank Ullrich	

Competition

The 1980–81 Biathlon World Cup was a multi-race tournament over a season of biathlon, organised by the UIPMB (Union Internationale de Pentathlon Moderne et Biathlon). The season started on 15 January 1981 in Jáchymov, Czechoslovakia, and ended on 5 April 1981 in Hedenäset, Sweden. It was the fourth season of the Biathlon World Cup, and it was only held for men.

== Calendar ==
Below is the World Cup calendar for the 1980–81 season.

Location	Date	Individual	Sprint	Relay
(Czechoslovakia) Jáchymov	15–17 January	●	●	●
(Italy) Antholz-Anterselva	22–25 January	●	●	●
(West Germany) Ruhpolding	29 January–1 February	●	●	●
(Finland) Lahti	12–15 February	●	●	●
(Sweden) Hedenäset	2–5 April	●	●	●
Total		5	5	5

*The relays were technically unofficial races as they did not count towards anything in the World Cup.

== World Cup Podium ==
=== Men ===
Stage	Date	Place	Discipline	Winner	Second	Third	Yellow bib (After competition)	Det.
1	15 January 1981	(Czechoslovakia) Jáchymov	20 km Individual	(Norway) Terje Krokstad	(Soviet Union) Viktor Tsiunel	(Czechoslovakia) Jaromír Šimůnek	(Norway) Terje Krokstad	Detail
1	16 January 1981	(Czechoslovakia) Jáchymov	10 km Sprint	(Norway) Kjell Søbak	(Soviet Union) Viktor Avdeyev	(Sweden) Hans Åhman	(Norway) Kjell Søbak	Detail
2	22 January 1981	(Italy) Antholz-Anterselva	20 km Individual	(Norway) Eirik Kvalfoss	(Finland) Toivo Mäkikyrö	(Soviet Union) Anatoly Alyabyev	(Norway) Kjell Søbak	Detail
2	24 January 1981	(Italy) Antholz-Anterselva	10 km Sprint	(Soviet Union) Anatoly Alyabyev	(Soviet Union) Piotr Miloradov	(East Germany) Bernd Hellmich	(Soviet Union) Anatoly Alyabyev	Detail
3	28 January 1981	(West Germany) Ruhpolding	20 km Individual	(Soviet Union) Vladimir Alikin	(East Germany) Frank Ullrich	(Soviet Union) Anatoly Alyabyev	(Soviet Union) Anatoly Alyabyev	Detail
3	31 January 1981	(West Germany) Ruhpolding	10 km Sprint	(East Germany) Frank Ullrich	(West Germany) Peter Angerer	(Norway) Eirik Kvalfoss	(Soviet Union) Anatoly Alyabyev	Detail
WC	12 February 1981	(Finland) Lahti	20 km Individual	(Finland) Heikki Ikola	(East Germany) Frank Ullrich	(Finland) Erkki Antila	(East Germany) Frank Ullrich	Detail
WC	14 February 1981	(Finland) Lahti	10 km Sprint	(East Germany) Frank Ullrich	(Finland) Erkki Antila	(France) Yvon Mougel	(East Germany) Frank Ullrich	Detail
4	2 April 1981	(Sweden) Hedenäset	20 km Individual	(West Germany) Fritz Fischer	(West Germany) Peter Angerer	(West Germany) Franz Bernreiter	(East Germany) Frank Ullrich	Detail
4	4 April 1981	(Sweden) Hedenäset	10 km Sprint	(Norway) Eirik Kvalfoss	(West Germany) Peter Angerer	(West Germany) Fritz Fischer	(East Germany) Frank Ullrich	Detail

== Standings: Men ==
=== Overall ===
Pos.		Points
1.	(East Germany) Frank Ullrich	140
2.	(Soviet Union) Anatoly Alyabyev	130
3.	(Norway) Kjell Søbak	128
4.	(Norway) Eirik Kvalfoss	120
5.	(West Germany) Peter Angerer	117

- Final standings after 10 races.

== Achievements ==
First World Cup career victory

- Terje Krokstad (NOR), 24, in his 4th season — the WC 1 Individual in Jáchymov; first podium was 1978–79 Individual in Jáchymov
- Kjell Søbak (NOR), 23, in his 3rd season — the WC 1 Sprint in Jáchymov; first podium was 1978–79 Individual in Sodankylä
- Eirik Kvalfoss (NOR), 21, in his 1st season — the WC 2 Individual in Antholz-Anterselva; it also was his first podium
- Vladimir Alikin (URS), 23, in his 3rd season — the WC 3 Individual in Ruhpolding; first podium was 1978–79 Individual in Bardufoss
- Heikki Ikola (FIN), 33, in his 4th season — the World Championships Individual in Lahti; first podium was 1977–78 Sprint in Sodankylä
- Fritz Fischer (FRG), 24, in his 2nd season — the WC 4 Individual in Hedenäset; it also was his first podium

First World Cup podium

- Viktor Ciunkel (URS) — no. 2 in the WC 1 Individual in Jáchymov
- Jaromír Šimůnek (TCH), 25, in his 4th season — no. 3 in the WC 1 Individual in Jáchymov; it also was the first podium for a Czechoslovak biathlete
- Viktor Avdejev (URS), in his 3rd season — no. 2 in the WC 1 Sprint in Jáchymov
- Hans Åhman (SWE), 28, in his 2nd season — no. 3 in the WC 1 Sprint in Jáchymov; it also was the first podium for a Swedish biathlete
- Toivo Mäkikyrö (FIN), 23, in his 1st season — no. 2 in the WC 2 Individual in Antholz-Anterselva
- Pjotr Miloradov (URS) — no. 2 in the WC 2 Sprint in Antholz-Anterselva
- Bernd Hellmich (GDR), 22, in his 1st season — no. 3 in the WC 2 Sprint in Antholz-Anterselva
- Peter Angerer (FRG), 21, in his 2nd season — no. 2 in the WC 3 Sprint in Ruhpolding
- Erkki Antila (FIN), 26, in his 4th season — no. 3 in the World Championships Individual in Lahti
- Franz Bernreiter (FRG), 27, in his 2nd season — no. 3 in the WC 4 Individual in Hedenäset

Victory in this World Cup (all-time number of victories in parentheses)

- Frank Ullrich (GDR), 2 (10) first places
- Eirik Kvalfoss (NOR), 2 (2) first places
- Anatoly Alyabyev (URS), 1 (2) first place
- Terje Krokstad (NOR), 1 (1) first place
- Kjell Søbak (NOR), 1 (1) first place
- Vladimir Alikin (URS), 1 (1) first place
- Heikki Ikola (FIN), 1 (1) first place
- Fritz Fischer (FRG), 1 (1) first place

== Retirements ==
Following notable biathletes retired after the 1980–81 season:

- Eberhard Rösch (GDR)
- Sigleif Johansen (NOR)
