= Biathlon at the 1984 Winter Olympics – Relay =

Men's biathlon relay at the XIV Olympic Winter Games
- Venue: Igman - Veliko Polke
- Dates: February 17, 1984
- Competitors: 68 from 17 nations
- Winning time: 1:38:51.7

Medalists
1st place, gold medalist(s)		Soviet Union; Dmitry Vasilyev; Juri Kashkarov; Algimantas Šalna; Sergei Bulygin
2nd place, silver medalist(s)		Norway; Odd Lirhus; Eirik Kvalfoss; Rolf Storsveen; Kjell Søbak
3rd place, bronze medalist(s)		West Germany; Ernst Reiter; Walter Pichler; Peter Angerer; Fritz Fischer

The Men's 4 × 7.5 kilometre biathlon relay competition at the 1984 Winter Olympics 17 February, at Igman - Veliko Polke. Each national team consisted of four members, with each skiing 7.5 kilometres and shooting twice, once prone and once standing.

At each shooting station, a competitor has eight shots to hit five targets; however, only five bullets are loaded in a magazine at one - if additional shots are required, the spare bullets must be loaded one at a time. If after the eight shots are taken, there are still targets not yet hit, the competitor must ski a 150-metre penalty loop.

== Summary ==
The Soviet Union, the reigning world champions, and having never lost this event in the Olympics, and East Germany, which had won four consecutive world titles before the Soviets took the title in 1983, were the main favourites. Dmitry Vasilyev gave the Soviets a lead of more than a minute after the first leg. The East Germans cut the lead to thirty seconds after the second leg, while Norway, which had started disastrously, with Odd Lirhus taking two penalty loops, had sprint champion Eirik Kvalfoss move them up to third.

The East Germans then moved ahead on the third leg, after Algimantas Šalna had to go on the penalty loop twice himself. However, Frank Ullrich, winner of 9 world championship gold medals, and three medals at the last Olympics, struggled with his skiing, only having the 10th fastest leg, and leaving his team fourth. For the Soviets, it was another story, Sergei Bulygin shooting clear and skiing a quick leg to win his side gold. They held off a hard charge from the Norwegians, as Kjell Søbak followed his teammate Kvalfoss in putting up the fastest leg to earn silver. Individual champion Peter Angerer had put the West Germans third going into the final leg, and while Fritz Fischer did not make up ground on the Soviets, they did move into bronze position by passing their East German opponents.

== Results ==
Rank	Bib	Team	Penalties (P+S)	Result	Deficit
1st place, gold medalist(s)	3	Soviet Union; Dmitry Vasilyev; Juri Kashkarov; Algimantas Šalna; Sergei Bulygin	2+9; 0+1 0+1; 0+3 0+0; 0+1 2+3; 0+0 0+0	1:38:51.7; 24:52.4; 24:34.8; 25:17.8; 24:06.7	–
2nd place, silver medalist(s)	6	Norway; Odd Lirhus; Eirik Kvalfoss; Rolf Storsveen; Kjell Søbak	2+10; 0+1 2+3; 0+0 0+2; 0+1 0+1; 0+0 0+2	1:39:03.9; 26:56.2; 23:27.6; 24:46.5; 23:53.6	+12.2
3rd place, bronze medalist(s)	13	West Germany; Ernst Reiter; Walter Pichler; Peter Angerer; Fritz Fischer	1+9; 0+0 0+0; 0+2 1+3; 0+0 0+0; 0+2 0+2	1:39:05.1; 26:01.9; 25:13.5; 23:39.3; 24:10.4	+13.4
4	5	East Germany; Holger Wick; Frank-Peter Roetsch; Matthias Jacob; Frank Ullrich	1+9; 0+0 1+3; 0+0 0+0; 0+0 0+3; 0+1 0+2	1:40:04.7; 26:01.2; 23:52.6; 24:32.8; 25:38.1	+1:13.0
5	7	Italy; Adriano Darioli; Gottlieb Taschler; Johann Passler; Andreas Zingerle	0+9; 0+0 0+3; 0+0 0+1; 0+1 0+3; 0+0 0+1	1:42:32.8; 26:14.3; 25:43.5; 25:50.4; 24:44.6	+3:41.1
6	9	Czechoslovakia; Jaromír Šimůnek; Zdeněk Hák; Peter Zelinka; Jan Matouš	4+11; 0+2 0+0; 0+2 0+1; 0+0 1+3; 0+0 3+3	1:42:40.5; 25:59.5; 25:06.4; 26:16.2; 25:18.4	+3:48.8
7	16	Finland; Keijo Tiitola; Toivo Mäkikyrö; Arto Jääskeläinen; Tapio Piipponen	2+10; 0+2 0+0; 0+1 1+3; 0+1 1+3; 0+0 0+0	1:43:16.0; 25:58.9; 26:08.4; 26:29.9; 24:38.8	+4:24.3
8	2	Austria; Rudolf Horn; Walter Hörl; Franz Schuler; Alfred Eder	1+11; 0+1 0+1; 1+3 0+0; 0+1 0+3; 0+0 0+2	1:43:28.1; 26:17.2; 25:48.6; 26:18.7; 25:03.6	+4:36.4
9	17	France; Francis Mougel; Éric Claudon; Yvon Mougel; Christian Poirot	3+10; 2+3 0+2; 0+0 0+0; 1+3 0+2; 0+0 0+0	1:43:57.6; 27:23.6; 25:36.1; 26:22.9; 24:35.0	+5:05.9
10	11	Sweden; Sven Fahlén; Tommy Höglund; Roger Westling; Ronnie Adolfsson	2+14; 0+3 1+3; 0+0 0+1; 0+2 0+0; 0+2 1+3	1:44:28.2; 27:02.0; 25:23.4; 26:04.9; 25:57.9	+5:36.5
11	4	United States; Bill Carow; Donald Nielsen, Jr. Lyle Nelson; Josh Thompson	0+12; 0+1 0+3; 0+3 0+3; 0+0 0+1; 0+1 0+0	1:44:31.9; 27:23.9; 26:42.7; 24:58.2; 25:27.1	+5:40.2
12	12	Great Britain; Jim Wood; Patrick Howdle; Tony McLeod; Charles MacIvor	0+13; 0+1 0+0; 0+1 0+2; 0+1 0+3; 0+3 0+2	1:46:17.2; 27:11.6; 26:20.1; 26:11.1; 26:34.4	+7:25.5
13	10	Romania; Vladimir Todaşcă; Mihai Rădulescu; Imre Lestyan; Gheorghe Berdar	2+6; 0+0 0+0; 0+0 0+1; 0+0 0+1; 2+3 0+1	1:47:44.8; 26:35.8; 26:33.5; 26:42.1; 27:53.4	+8:53.1
14	1	Hungary; János Spisák; Gábor Mayer; László Palácsik; Zsolt Kovács	4+13; 0+1 0+1; 0+1 1+3; 1+3 2+3; 0+0 0+1	1:48:40.0; 26:57.5; 26:34.4; 29:03.7; 26:04.4	+9:48.3
15	14	Japan; Isao Yamase; Shoichi Kinoshita; Yoshinobu Murase; Hiroyuki Deguchi	1+16; 0+2 1+3; 0+2 0+2; 0+2 0+3; 0+0 0+2	1:51:43.1; 29:08.6; 27:35.1; 27:31.5; 27:27.9	+12:51.4
16	15	China; Sun Xiaoping; Long Yunzhou; Liu Hongwang; Song Yongjun	0+11; 0+1 0+2; 0+0 0+2; 0+3 0+1; 0+1 0+1	1:53:04.1; 28:54.4; 28:09.1; 28:27.0; 27:33.6	+14:12.4
17	8	Yugoslavia; Andrej Lanišek; Jure Velepec; Zoran Ćosić; Franjo Jakovac	3+15; 0+2 0+2; 0+1 1+3; 0+1 1+3; 0+0 1+3	1:54:13.8; 28:28.7; 28:32.2; 28:30.5; 28:42.4	+15:22.1
