= 1979–80 Biathlon World Cup =

Biathlon competition

1979–80 World Cup
Discipline	Men	Women
Overall	(East Germany) Frank Ullrich	

Competition

The 1979–80 Biathlon World Cup was a multi-race tournament over a season of biathlon, organised by the UIPMB (Union Internationale de Pentathlon Moderne et Biathlon). The season started on 18 January 1980 in Ruhpolding, West Germany, and ended on 30 March 1980 in Murmansk, Soviet Union. It was the third season of the Biathlon World Cup, and it was only held for men.

== Calendar ==
Below is the World Cup calendar for the 1979–80 season.

Location	Date	Individual	Sprint	Relay
(West Germany) Ruhpolding	18–20 January	●	●	●
(Italy) Antholz-Anterselva	24–27 January	●	●	●
(United States) Lake Placid	16–22 February	●	●	●
(Finland) Lahti	14–16 March	●	●	●
(Sweden) Hedenäset	20–23 March	●	●	●
(Soviet Union) Murmansk	27–30 March	●	●	●
Total		6	6	6

- 1980 Winter Olympics races were not included in the 1979–80 World Cup scoring system.

*The relays were technically unofficial races as they did not count towards anything in the World Cup.

== World Cup Podium ==
=== Men ===
Stage	Date	Place	Discipline	Winner	Second	Third	Yellow bib (After competition)
1	18 January 1980	(West Germany) Ruhpolding	20 km Individual	(East Germany) Klaus Siebert	(East Germany) Eberhard Rösch	(East Germany) Matthias Jacob	(East Germany) Klaus Siebert
1	19 January 1980	(West Germany) Ruhpolding	10 km Sprint	(East Germany) Frank Ullrich	(East Germany) Klaus Siebert	(France) Yvon Mougel	(East Germany) Klaus Siebert
2	24 January 1980	(Italy) Antholz-Anterselva	20 km Individual	(East Germany) Klaus Siebert	(East Germany) Frank Ullrich	(Austria) Alfred Eder	(East Germany) Klaus Siebert
2	26 January 1980	(Italy) Antholz-Anterselva	10 km Sprint	(East Germany) Frank Ullrich	(East Germany) Mathias Jung	(East Germany) Manfred Beer	(East Germany) Klaus Siebert
3	14 March 1980	(Finland) Lahti	20 km Individual	(Soviet Union) Vladimir Gavrikov	(East Germany) Mathias Jung	(Finland) Keijo Kuntola	(East Germany) Frank Ullrich
3	15 March 1980	(Finland) Lahti	10 km Sprint	(Soviet Union) Vladimir Gavrikov	(East Germany) Frank Ullrich	(East Germany) Klaus Siebert	(East Germany) Frank Ullrich
4	20 March 1980	(Sweden) Hedenäset	20 km Individual	(East Germany) Klaus Siebert	(East Germany) Frank Ullrich	(East Germany) Eberhard Rösch	(East Germany) Frank Ullrich
4	22 March 1980	(Sweden) Hedenäset	10 km Sprint	(East Germany) Frank Ullrich	(East Germany) Klaus Siebert	(Soviet Union) Vladimir Alikin	(East Germany) Frank Ullrich
5	27 March 1980	(Soviet Union) Murmansk	20 km Individual	(East Germany) Frank Ullrich	(Bulgaria) Vladimir Velichkov	(East Germany) Eberhard Rösch	(East Germany) Frank Ullrich
5	29 March 1980	(Soviet Union) Murmansk	10 km Sprint	(East Germany) Eberhard Rösch	(Soviet Union) Vladimir Alikin	(Bulgaria) Vladimir Velichkov	(East Germany) Frank Ullrich

== Standings: Men ==
=== Overall ===
Pos.		Points
1.	(East Germany) Frank Ullrich	148
2.	(East Germany) Klaus Siebert	146
3.	(East Germany) Eberhard Rösch	133
4.	(Soviet Union) Vladimir Gavrikov	129
5.	(East Germany) Mathias Jung	127

- Final standings after 10 races.

== Achievements ==
First World Cup career victory

- Vladimir Gavrikov (URS), — the WC 3 Individual in Lahti; it also was his first podium
- Eberhard Rösch (GDR), 25, in his 3rd season — the WC 5 Sprint in Murmansk; first podium was 1977–78 Individual in Ruhpolding

First World Cup podium

- Matthias Jacob (GDR), 19, in his 1st season — no. 3 in the WC 1 Individual in Ruhpolding
- Yvon Mougel (FRA), 23, in his 3rd season — no. 3 in the WC 1 Sprint in Ruhpolding; it also was the first podium for a French biathlete
- Alfred Eder (AUT), 26, in his 3rd season — no. 3 in the WC 2 Individual in Antholz-Anterselva
- Mathias Jung (GDR), 21, in his 2nd season — no. 2 in the WC 2 Sprint in Antholz-Anterselva
- Manfred Beer (GDR), 26, in his 3rd season — no. 3 in the WC 2 Sprint in Antholz-Anterselva
- Keijo Kuntola (FIN), 26, in his 3rd season — no. 3 in the WC 3 Individual in Lahti
- Vladimir Velichkov (BUL), 20, in his 1st season — no. 2 in the WC 5 Individual in Murmansk; it also was the first podium for a Bulgarian biathlete

Victory in this World Cup (all-time number of victories in parentheses)

- Frank Ullrich (GDR), 4 (8) first places
- Klaus Siebert (GDR), 3 (8) first places
- Vladimir Gavrikov (URS), 2 (2) first places
- Eberhard Rösch (GDR), 1 (1) first place

== Retirements ==
Following notable biathletes retired after the 1979–80 season:

- Manfred Beer (GDR)
- Klaus Siebert (GDR)
- Alexander Tikhonov (URS)
- Alexander Ushakov (URS)

== Notes ==
1. ^{1} This team was a regional team from Finland called Suomussalmen Rasti.
2. ^{2} The Aftenposten source gives the French team a time of 1:59:58.
