= 1978–79 Biathlon World Cup =

Biathlon competition

1978–79 World Cup
Discipline	Men	Women
Overall	(East Germany) Klaus Siebert	

Competition

The 1978–79 Biathlon World Cup was a multi-race tournament over a season of biathlon, organised by the UIPMB (Union Internationale de Pentathlon Moderne et Biathlon). The season started on 10 January 1979 in Jáchymov, Czechoslovakia, and ended on 8 April 1979 in Bardufoss, Norway. It was the second season of the Biathlon World Cup, and it was only held for men.

== Calendar ==
Below is the World Cup calendar for the 1978–79 season.

Location	Date	Individual	Sprint	Relay
(Czechoslovakia) Jáchymov	10–12 January	●	●	●
(Italy) Antholz-Anterselva	21–24 January	●	●	●
(West Germany) Ruhpolding	28 February–2 March	●	●	●
(Finland) Sodankylä	30 March–1 April	●	●	●
(Norway) Bardufoss	6–8 April	●	●	●
Total		5	5	5

*The relays were technically unofficial races as they did not count towards anything in the World Cup.

== World Cup Podium ==
=== Men ===
Stage	Date	Place	Discipline	Winner	Second	Third	Yellow bib (After competition)	Det.
1	10 January 1979	(Czechoslovakia) Jáchymov	20 km Individual	(Norway) Roar Nilsen	(East Germany) Eberhard Rösch	(Norway) Terje Krokstad	(Norway) Roar Nilsen	Detail
1	11 January 1979	(Czechoslovakia) Jáchymov	10 km Sprint	(Austria) Rudolf Horn	(East Germany) Frank Ullrich	(Norway) Terje Krokstad	(Norway) Terje Krokstad	Detail
2	21 January 1979	(Italy) Antholz-Anterselva	20 km Individual	(Soviet Union) Vladimir Barnashov	(East Germany) Heinz Böttcher	(East Germany) Klaus Siebert	(Norway) Terje Krokstad	Detail
2	23 January 1979	(Italy) Antholz-Anterselva	10 km Sprint	(Soviet Union) Alexander Tikhonov	(Soviet Union) Vladimir Barnashov	(East Germany) Klaus Siebert	(Soviet Union) Vladimir Barnashov	Detail
WC	28 January 1979	(West Germany) Ruhpolding	20 km Individual	(East Germany) Klaus Siebert	(Soviet Union) Alexander Tikhonov	(Norway) Sigleif Johansen	(East Germany) Klaus Siebert	Detail
WC	31 January 1979	(West Germany) Ruhpolding	10 km Sprint	(East Germany) Frank Ullrich	(Norway) Odd Lirhus	(Italy) Luigi Weiss	(East Germany) Klaus Siebert	Detail
3	30 March 1979	(Finland) Sodankylä	20 km Individual	(Soviet Union) Anatoly Alyabyev	(East Germany) Klaus Siebert	(Norway) Kjell Søbak	(East Germany) Klaus Siebert	Detail
3	31 March 1979	(Finland) Sodankylä	10 km Sprint	(East Germany) Klaus Siebert	(Norway) Kjell Søbak	(Soviet Union) Vladimir Barnashov	(East Germany) Klaus Siebert	Detail
4	6 April 1979	(Norway) Bardufoss	20 km Individual	(Soviet Union) Alexander Tikhonov	(East Germany) Frank Ullrich	(Soviet Union) Vladimir Alikin	(East Germany) Klaus Siebert	Detail
4	7 April 1979	(Norway) Bardufoss	10 km Sprint	(Norway) Sigleif Johansen	(Soviet Union) Vladimir Barnashov	(East Germany) Klaus Siebert	(East Germany) Klaus Siebert	Detail

== Standings: Men ==
=== Overall ===
Pos.		Points
1.	(East Germany) Klaus Siebert	143
2.	(East Germany) Frank Ullrich	136
3.	(Soviet Union) Vladimir Barnashov	128
4.	(Soviet Union) Alexander Tikhonov	114
5.	(East Germany) Eberhard Rösch	114

- Final standings after 10 races.

== Achievements ==
First World Cup career victory

- Roar Nilsen (NOR), 26, in his 2nd season — the WC 1 Individual in Jáchymov; it also was his first podium
- Rudolf Horn (AUT), 24, in his 2nd season — the WC 1 Sprint in Jáchymov; it also was his first podium and the first podium for an Austrian biathlete
- Alexander Tikhonov (URS), 32, in his 2nd season — the WC 2 Sprint in Antholz-Anterselva; first podium was 1977–78 Sprint in Sodankylä
- Anatoly Alyabyev (URS), 27, in his 2nd season — the WC 3 Individual in Sodankylä; first podium was 1977–78 Individual in Murmansk

First World Cup podium

- Terje Krokstad (NOR), 22, in his 2nd season — no. 3 in the WC 1 Individual in Jáchymov
- Luigi Weiss (ITA), 27, in his 2nd season — no. 3 in the World Championships Sprint in Ruhpolding; it also was the first podium for an Italian biathlete
- Kjell Søbak (NOR), 21, in his 1st season — no. 3 in the WC 3 Individual in Sodankylä
- Vladimir Alikin (URS), 21, in his 1st season — no. 3 in the WC 4 Individual in Bardufoss

Victory in this World Cup (all-time number of victories in parentheses)

- Klaus Siebert (GDR), 2 (5) first places
- Alexander Tikhonov (URS), 2 (2) first places
- Frank Ullrich (GDR), 1 (4) first place
- Vladimir Barnashov (URS), 1 (2) first place
- Sigleif Johansen (NOR), 1 (2) first place
- Roar Nilsen (NOR), 1 (1) first place
- Rudolf Horn (AUT), 1 (1) first place
- Anatoly Alyabyev (URS), 1 (1) first place

== Notes ==
1. ^{1} ^{2} ^{3} ^{4} ^{5} ^{6} In the individual races in Jáchymov some non-World Cup racers participated. In the 20 km individual Jürgen Grundler, Thomas Klinger and Wolfgang Schütze, among others, were non-World Cup racers, and so for World Cup purposes Roar Nilsen won the race, with Rösch and Krokstad coming 2nd and 3rd. Pavlíček, Hess, Avdejev, Engen, Tor Svendsberget, Mathias Jung and Heinz Böttcher came 4th, 5th, 6th, 7th, 8th, 9th and 10th respectively and received the appropriate World Cup points. In the 10 km sprint, some of the non-World Cup racers were Sigvart Bjøntegaard, Stig Kvistad and Gerold Eichhorn, and so they did not receive any World Cup points, and for World Cup purposes Terje Krokstad came 3rd in that race and received the appropriate World Cup points, with Rösch, Hess, Grundler and Mitev coming 4th, 5th, 6th and 7th, respectively, and receiving the appropriate World Cup points.

== Retirements ==
Following notable biathletes retired after the 1978–79 season:

- Simo Halonen (FIN)
- Tor Svendsberget (NOR)
- Nikolay Kruglov (URS)
