= Vladimir Velichkov =

Bulgarian biathlete

Personal information
- Full name: Vladimir Velichkov
- Born: 24 May 1959 (age 67) Stambolovo, Ihtiman, Sofia Province, Bulgaria
- Height: 1.75 m (5 ft 9 in)

Sport

Professional information
- Sport: Biathlon
- Club: AC Septemvriisko Zname

Olympic Games
- Teams: 3 (1980, 1984, 1988)
- Medals: 0

World Championships
- Teams: 7 (1982, 1983, 1985, 1986, 1987, 1989, 1990)
- Medals: 0

World Cup
- Seasons: 11 (1979/80–1989/90)
- Individual victories: 0
- All victories: 0
- Individual podiums: 2
- All podiums: 2

Vladimir Velichkov (Bulgarian: Владимир Величков; born 24 May 1959) is a Bulgarian former biathlete. He was among the best biathletes during the 1980s and he is generally recognised as the greatest male Bulgarian biathlete of all time.

== Life and career ==
Born in the village of Stambolovo in the southwestern part of Bulgaria, Velichkov started his active sports career in sixth grade, when he joined the local cross-country skiing club. He later switched to biathlon. Velichkov participated in his first Olympics in 1980 and he debuted at the World Championship-level at the World Championships in Minsk in 1982. He also participated in the Olympics in 1984 and 1988 and the World Championships in 1983, 1985, 1986, 1987, 1989 and 1990 for Bulgaria. His best individual finish at the Olympics came in the 20 km individual in 1984, he finished 13th. His best, and only, relay finish came in 1988, an 8th place. His best individual finish at the World Championships came in 1982 in Minsk where Velichkov finished 5th, a feat he copied three years later in Ruhpolding, both in the sprint. His best relay finish at the World Championships was a 10th which came in 1989 in Feistritz, where his best, and only, team event finish also came, a 12th place.

In the World Cup, Velichkov debuted in the first round of the 1979–80 World Cup in Ruhpolding in West Germany. Over his career he finished twice on the podium. Both came in Murmansk in the last round of his debut season, a second place in the 20 km individual and a third in the 10 km sprint. These podium finishes were the first for a Bulgarian biathlete, and, as of the end of the 2014–15 season, the last by a male Bulgarian biathlete. He also finished in the top ten in multiple other races. These finishes were not matched by any other male Bulgarian biathlete but his contemporary Spas Slatev until the 2014–15 season, where Krasimir Anev finished 4th in a mass start race in Oberhof, and Vladimir Iliev finished 6th twice during the 2015 World Championships in Kontiolahti. Velichkov was a part of the relay team that finished 6th in the World Cup race in Ruhpolding in 1988, which is still the best relay finish by a male Bulgarian relay team. Velichkov's best overall finish came in the 1981–82 World Cup where he finished 9th, the best overall finish by any male Bulgarian biathlete.

Velichkov retired as an athlete after the 1989–90 season. After his retirement from professional sports, Velichkov opened his own carpentry workshop. In 2014, he entered the Board of Directors of the Bulgarian Biathlon Federation.

== Biathlon results ==
All results are sourced from the International Biathlon Union.

=== Olympic Games ===
Event	Individual	Sprint	Relay
(United States) 1980 Lake Placid	43rd	34th	—
(Socialist Federal Republic of Yugoslavia) 1984 Sarajevo	13th	14th	—
(Canada) 1988 Calgary	21st	38th	8th

=== World Championships ===
Event	Individual	Sprint	Team	Relay
(Soviet Union) 1982 Minsk	18th	5th	—N/a	—
(Italy) 1983 Antholz-Anterselva	15th	12th	—N/a	—
(West Germany) 1985 Ruhpolding	33rd	5th	—N/a	—
(Norway) 1986 Oslo Holmenkollen	26th	19th	—N/a	11th
(United States) 1987 Lake Placid	33rd	7th	—N/a	—
(Austria) 1989 Feistritz	45th	35th	12th	10th
(Soviet Union) 1990 Minsk	55th	—	—	—

*During Olympic seasons competitions are only held for those events not included in the Olympic program.
**Team was added as an event in 1989.
