= 1981–82 Biathlon World Cup =

Biathlon competition

1981–82 World Cup
Discipline	Men	Women
Overall	(East Germany) Frank Ullrich	

Competition

The 1981–82 Biathlon World Cup was a multi-race tournament over a season of biathlon, organised by the UIPMB (Union Internationale de Pentathlon Moderne et Biathlon). The season started on 14 January 1982 in Egg am Etzel, Switzerland, and ended on 7 March 1982 in Lahti, Finland. It was the fifth season of the Biathlon World Cup, and it was only held for men.

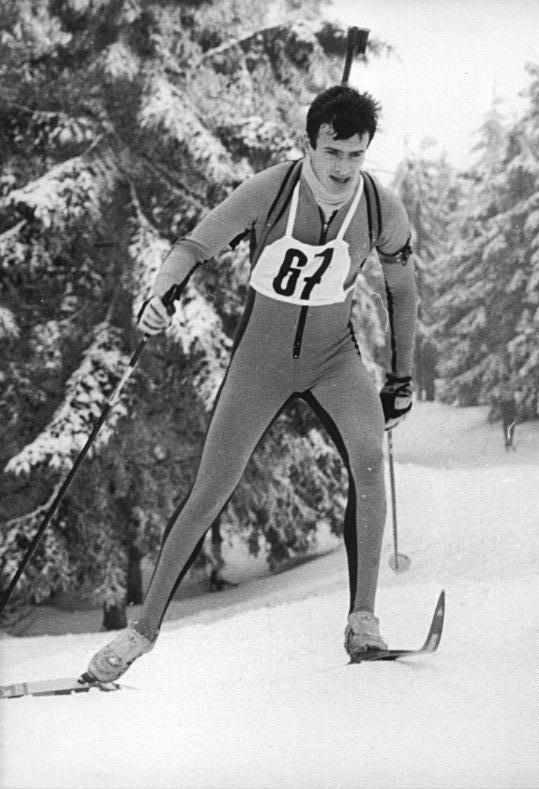
Matthias Jacob at the sprint in Lahti.

== Calendar ==
Below is the World Cup calendar for the 1981–82 season.

Location	Date	Individual	Sprint	Relay
(Switzerland) Egg am Etzel	14–17 January	●	●	●
(Italy) Antholz-Anterselva	21–24 January	●	●	●
(West Germany) Ruhpolding	28–30 January	●	●	
(Soviet Union) Minsk	10–14 February	●	●	●
(Finland) Lahti	5–7 March	●	●	
Total		5	5	4

*The relays were technically unofficial races as they did not count towards anything in the World Cup.

== World Cup Podium ==
=== Men ===
Stage	Date	Place	Discipline	Winner	Second	Third	Yellow bib (After competition)	Det.
1	14 January 1982	(Switzerland) Egg am Etzel	20 km Individual	(Norway) Svein Engen	(West Germany) Walter Pichler	(West Germany) Fritz Fischer	(Norway) Svein Engen	Detail
1	16 January 1982	(Switzerland) Egg am Etzel	10 km Sprint	(East Germany) Frank Ullrich	(East Germany) Matthias Jacob	(West Germany) Fritz Fischer	(East Germany) Frank Ullrich	Detail
2	21 January 1982	(Italy) Antholz-Anterselva	20 km Individual	(East Germany) Andreas Göthel	(East Germany) Matthias Jacob	(East Germany) Bernd Hellmich	(East Germany) Frank Ullrich	Detail
2	23 January 1982	(Italy) Antholz-Anterselva	10 km Sprint	(East Germany) Frank Ullrich	(Norway) Kjell Søbak	(East Germany) Matthias Jacob	(East Germany) Frank Ullrich	Detail
3	28 January 1982	(West Germany) Ruhpolding	20 km Individual	(East Germany) Frank Ullrich	(Soviet Union) Sergei Bulygin	(East Germany) Matthias Jacob	(East Germany) Frank Ullrich	Detail
3	30 January 1982	(West Germany) Ruhpolding	10 km Sprint	(East Germany) Matthias Jacob	(Finland) Tapio Piipponen	(Norway) Kjell Søbak	(East Germany) Frank Ullrich	Detail
WC	10 February 1982	(Soviet Union) Minsk	20 km Individual	(East Germany) Frank Ullrich	(Norway) Eirik Kvalfoss	(Norway) Terje Krokstad	(East Germany) Frank Ullrich	Detail
WC	13 February 1982	(Soviet Union) Minsk	10 km Sprint	(Norway) Eirik Kvalfoss	(East Germany) Frank Ullrich	(Soviet Union) Vladimir Alikin	(East Germany) Frank Ullrich	Detail
4	5 March 1982	(Finland) Lahti	20 km Individual	(Norway) Kjell Søbak	(Norway) Odd Lirhus	(West Germany) Fritz Fischer	(East Germany) Frank Ullrich	Detail
4	6 March 1982	(Finland) Lahti	10 km Sprint	(East Germany) Matthias Jacob	(Norway) Odd Lirhus	(Norway) Kjell Søbak	(East Germany) Frank Ullrich	Detail

== Standings: Men ==
=== Overall ===
Pos.		Points
1.	(East Germany) Frank Ullrich	146
2.	(East Germany) Matthias Jacob	143
3.	(Norway) Kjell Søbak	137
4.	(East Germany) Andreas Göthel	125
5.	(West Germany) Fritz Fischer	123

- Final standings after 10 races.

== Achievements ==
First World Cup career victory

- Svein Engen (NOR), 28, in his 5th season — the WC 1 Individual in Egg am Etzel; first podium was 1977–78 Individual in Sodankylä
- Andreas Göthel (GDR), 23, in his 1st season — the WC 2 Individual in Antholz-Anterselva; it also was his first podium
- Matthias Jacob (GDR), 21, in his 3rd season — the WC 3 Sprint in Ruhpolding; first podium was 1979–80 Individual in Ruhpolding

First World Cup podium

- Walter Pichler (FRG), 22, in his 1st season — no. 2 in the WC 1 Individual in Egg am Etzel
- Viktor Bulygin (URS), in his 1st season — no. 2 in the WC 3 Individual in Ruhpolding
- Taipio Piipponen (FIN), 24, in his 3rd season — no. 2 in the WC 3 Sprint in Ruhpolding

Victory in this World Cup (all-time number of victories in parentheses)

- Frank Ullrich (GDR), 4 (14) first places
- Matthias Jacob (GDR), 2 (2) first places
- Eirik Kvalfoss (NOR), 1 (3) first place
- Kjell Søbak (NOR), 1 (2) first place
- Svein Engen (NOR), 1 (1) first place
- Andreas Göthel (GDR), 1 (1) first place

== Retirements ==
Following notable biathletes retired after the 1981–82 season:

- Heikki Ikola (FIN)
