= 1982–83 Biathlon World Cup =

Biathlon competition

1982–83 World Cup
Discipline	Men	Women
Overall	(West Germany) Peter Angerer	

Competition

The 1982–83 Biathlon World Cup was a multi-race tournament over a season of biathlon, organised by the UIPMB (Union Internationale de Pentathlon Moderne et Biathlon). The season started on 27 January 1983 in Ruhpolding, West Germany, and ended on 11 March 1983 in Holmenkollen, Norway. It was the sixth season of the Biathlon World Cup, and the first in which women were allowed to compete in their own European Cup. Though called the European Cup, participation was not restricted to Europeans.

The second World Cup round was originally going to be held in Oberhof, East Germany, but they had to cancel due to a lack of snow. The races were therefore moved to Antholz-Anterselva, Italy.

Originally the first round of the European Cup was to be held in Jáchymov, Czechoslovakia from 21 to 24 January 1983, but it was cancelled, thus the races in Lappeenranta, Finland were the only ones held.

== Men's calendar ==
Below is the World Cup calendar for the 1982–83 season.

Location	Date	Individual	Sprint	Relay
(West Germany) Ruhpolding	27–30 January	●	●	●
(Italy) Antholz-Anterselva	9–12 February	●	●	●
(Italy) Antholz-Anterselva	24–27 February	●	●	●
(Finland) Lahti	4–5 March	●	●	
(Norway) Holmenkollen	9–11 March	●	●	●
Total		5	5	4

*The relays were technically unofficial races as they did not count towards anything in the World Cup.

== Women's calendar ==
Location	Date	Individual	Sprint	Relay
(Finland) Lappeenranta	4–6 March	●	●	●
Total		1	1	1

*The relays were technically unofficial races as they did not count towards anything in the World Cup.

== World Cup Podium ==
=== Men ===
Stage	Date	Place	Discipline	Winner	Second	Third	Yellow bib (After competition)	Det.
1	27 January 1983	(West Germany) Ruhpolding	20 km Individual	(West Germany) Peter Angerer	(West Germany) Andreas Schweiger	(East Germany) Frank Ullrich	(West Germany) Peter Angerer	
1	28 January 1983	(West Germany) Ruhpolding	10 km Sprint	(Norway) Eirik Kvalfoss	(East Germany) Frank Ullrich	(Norway) Odd Lirhus	(East Germany) Frank Ullrich	
2	9 February 1983	(Italy) Antholz-Anterselva	20 km Individual	(East Germany) Frank Ullrich	(Norway) Odd Lirhus	(West Germany) Peter Angerer	(East Germany) Frank Ullrich	
2	11 February 1983	(Italy) Antholz-Anterselva	10 km Sprint	(Soviet Union) Algimantas Šalna	(West Germany) Peter Angerer	(East Germany) Frank-Peter Roetsch	(East Germany) Frank Ullrich	
WC	23 February 1983	(Italy) Antholz-Anterselva	20 km Individual	(East Germany) Frank Ullrich	(East Germany) Frank-Peter Roetsch	(West Germany) Peter Angerer	(East Germany) Frank Ullrich	
WC	26 February 1983	(Italy) Antholz-Anterselva	10 km Sprint	(Norway) Eirik Kvalfoss	(West Germany) Peter Angerer	(Austria) Alfred Eder	(West Germany) Peter Angerer	
3	4 March 1983	(Finland) Lahti	20 km Individual	(Soviet Union) Algimantas Šalna	(Norway) Odd Lirhus	(West Germany) Fritz Fischer	(West Germany) Peter Angerer	
3	5 March 1983	(Finland) Lahti	10 km Sprint	(Soviet Union) Algimantas Šalna	(Norway) Eirik Kvalfoss	(Soviet Union) Dmitry Vasilyev	(West Germany) Peter Angerer	
4	9 March 1983	(Norway) Oslo Holmenkollen	20 km Individual	(Soviet Union) Dmitry Vasilyev	(Italy) Johann Passler	(West Germany) Andreas Schweiger	(West Germany) Peter Angerer	
4	10 March 1983	(Norway) Oslo Holmenkollen	10 km Sprint	(East Germany) Frank-Peter Roetsch	(West Germany) Peter Angerer	(Italy) Johann Passler	(West Germany) Peter Angerer	

=== Women ===
Stage	Date	Place	Discipline	Winner	Second	Third	Yellow bib (After competition)	Det.
1	4 March 1983	(Finland) Lappeenranta	10 km Individual	(Norway) Gry Østvik	(Finland) Pirjo Aalto	(Finland) Tuula Ylinen	(Norway) Gry Østvik	Detail
1	5 March 1983	(Finland) Lappeenranta	5 km Sprint	(Finland) Aino Kallunki	(Norway) Siv Bråten	(Finland) Aila Flyktman	(Norway) Gry Østvik	Detail

== Standings: Men ==
=== Overall ===
Pos.		Points
1.	(West Germany) Peter Angerer	143
2.	(Norway) Eirik Kvalfoss	136
3.	(East Germany) Frank Ullrich	134
4.	(East Germany) Frank-Peter Roetsch	128
5.	(Norway) Odd Lirhus	126

- Final standings after 10 races.

== Standings: Women ==
=== Overall ===
Pos.		Points
1.	(Norway) Gry Østvik	47
2.	(Norway) Siv Bråten	45
3.	(Finland) Aino Kallunki	43
4.	(Finland) Aila Flyktman	42
5.	(Finland) Tuula Ylinen	42

- Final standings after 2 races.

== Achievements ==
First World/European Cup career victory

- Peter Angerer (FRG), 23, in his 4th season — the WC 1 Individual in Ruhpolding; first podium was 1980–81 Sprint in Ruhpolding
- Algimantas Šalna (URS), 23, in his 2nd season — the WC 2 Sprint in Antholz-Anterselva; it also was his first podium
- Gry Østvik (NOR), 19, in her 1st season — the EC 1 Individual in Lappeenranta; it also was her first podium
- Aino Kallunki (FIN), in her 1st season — the EC 1 Sprint in Lappeenranta; it also was her first podium
- Dmitry Vasilyev (URS), 20, in his 1st season — the WC 4 Individual in Holmenkollen; first podium was 1982–83 Sprint in Lahti
- Frank-Peter Roetsch (GDR), 18, in his 1st season — the WC 4 Sprint in Holmenkollen; first podium was 1982–83 Sprint in Antholz-Anterselva

First World/European Cup podium

- Frank-Peter Roetsch (GDR), 18, in his 1st season — no. 3 in the WC 2 Sprint in Antholz-Anterselva
- Pirjo Mattila (FIN), in her 1st season — no. 2 in the EC 1 Individual in Lappeenranta
- Tuula Ylinen (FIN), in her 1st season — no. 3 in the EC 1 Individual in Lappeenranta
- Siv Bråten (NOR), 22, in her 1st season — no. 2 in the EC 1 Sprint in Lappeenranta
- Aila Flyktman (FIN), in her 1st season — no. 3 in the EC 1 Sprint in Lappeenranta
- Dmitry Vasilyev (URS), 20, in his 1st season — no. 3 in the WC 3 Sprint in Lahti
- Johann Passler (ITA), 21, in his 2nd season — no. 2 in the WC 4 Individual in Holmenkollen

Victory in this World/European Cup (all-time number of victories in parentheses)

- Algimantas Šalna (URS), 3 (3) first places
- Frank Ullrich (GDR), 2 (16) first places
- Eirik Kvalfoss (NOR), 2 (5) first places
- Peter Angerer (FRG), 1 (1) first place
- Gry Østvik (NOR), 1 (1) first place
- Aino Kallunki (FIN), 1 (1) first place
- Dmitry Vasilyev (URS), 1 (1) first place
- Frank-Peter Roetsch (GDR), 1 (1) first place

== Retirements ==
Following notable biathletes retired after the 1982–83 season:

- Erkki Antila (FIN)

== Notes ==
1. ^{1} In the individual races here some non-World Cup racers participated. Among those was Holger Wick, he was not a World Cup racer and so did not receive any World Cup points, and for World Cup purposes Vladimir Velichkov and Johann Passler finished 9th and 10th respectively in the 20 km individual and received the appropriate World Cup points.
