= Franz Bernreiter =

German former biathlete

Personal information
- Full name: Franz Bernreiter
- Born: 13 February 1954 (age 72) Bärnzell-Zwiesel, West Germany
- Height: 1.85 m (6 ft 1 in)

Sport

Professional information
- Sport: Biathlon
- Club: WSV Rabenstein

Olympic Games
- Teams: 1 (1980)
- Medals: 1 (0 gold)

World Championships
- Teams: 3 (1981, 1982, 1983)
- Medals: 1 (0 gold)

World Cup
- Seasons: 5 (1979/80–1983/84)
- Individual victories: 0
- Individual podiums: 1
Medal record
Men's biathlon
Representing West Germany
Olympic Games
| Bronze medal – third place | 1980 Lake Placid | 4 × 7.5 km relay |
World Championships
| Silver medal – second place | 1981 Lahti | 4 × 7.5 km relay |

Franz Bernreiter (born 13 February 1954) is a German former biathlete.

His best individual finish in the Biathlon World Cup was his only podium finish, a third place in the 1980–81 20 km individual in Hedenäset. In the same season, he also finished second as a part of the West German relay team at the World Championships in Lahti. He won bronze in the 1980 Winter Olympics once again as a bart of the West German relay team.

Bernreiter retired as an athlete after the 1983–84 season and the German Championships that year. After his retirement, he worked as a coach first in the West German team and later in the unified German team. He resigned from his coaching position after the 2009–10 season.
