= Kjell Søbak =

Norwegian biathlete (born 1957)

Personal information
- Full name: Kjell Søbak
- Born: 21 June 1957 (age 69) Bodø, Nordland, Norway

Sport

Professional information
- Sport: Biathlon
- World Cup debut: 10 January 1979

Olympic Games
- Teams: 2 (1980, 1984)
- Medals: 1 (0 gold)

World Championships
- Teams: 6 (1979, 1981, 1982, 1983, 1985, 1986)
- Medals: 2 (0 gold)

World Cup
- Seasons: 8 (1978/79–1985/86)
- Individual victories: 2
- Individual podiums: 8
Medal record
Men's biathlon
Representing Norway
Olympic Games
| Silver medal – second place | 1984 Sarajevo | 4 × 7.5 km relay |
World Championships
| Silver medal – second place | 1982 Minsk | 4 × 7.5 km relay |
| Bronze medal – third place | 1983 Antholz-Anterselva | 4 × 7.5 km relay |

Kjell Søbak (born 21 June 1957) is a Norwegian former biathlete. At the 1984 Olympics of Sarajevo, Søbak finished second with the Norwegian relay team, which consisted of himself, Eirik Kvalfoss, Rolf Storsveen, and Odd Lirhus. In addition, he finished fourth in the sprint competition at the same Olympics.

== Biathlon results ==
All results are sourced from the International Biathlon Union.

=== Olympic Games ===
1 medal (1 silver)

| Event | Individual | Sprint | Relay |
|---|---|---|---|
| (United States) 1980 Lake Placid | — | 5th | 4th |
| (Socialist Federal Republic of Yugoslavia) 1984 Sarajevo | — | 4th | Silver |

=== World Championships ===
2 medals (1 silver, 1 bronze)

| Event | Individual | Sprint | Relay |
|---|---|---|---|
| (West Germany) 1979 Ruhpolding | — | — | 4th |
| (Finland) 1981 Lahti | 8th | 4th | 4th |
| (Soviet Union) 1982 Minsk | 6th | 9th | Silver |
| (Italy) 1983 Antholz-Anterselva | 13th | 19th | Bronze |
| (Germany) 1985 Ruhpolding | 14th | 14th | 4th |
| (Norway) 1986 Oslo Holmenkollen | 20th | — | — |

*During Olympic seasons competitions are only held for those events not included in the Olympic program.

=== Individual victories ===
2 victories (1 In, 1 Sp)

| Season | Date | Location | Discipline | Level |
|---|---|---|---|---|
| 1980–81; 1 victory (1 Sp) | 16 January 1981 | (Czechoslovakia) Jáchymov | 10 km sprint | Biathlon World Cup |
| 1981–82; 1 victory (1 In) | 5 March 1982 | (Finland) Lahti | 20 km individual | Biathlon World Cup |

*Results are from UIPMB and IBU races which include the Biathlon World Cup, Biathlon World Championships and the Winter Olympic Games.
