= Vladimir Barnashov =

Soviet biathlete (born 1951)

Personal information
- Full name: Vladimir Mikhaylovich Barnashov
- Born: 26 February 1951 (age 75) Ryazany, Muromtsevsky, Omsk Oblast, RSFSR, Soviet Union
- Height: 1.78 m (5 ft 10 in)

Sport

Professional information
- Sport: Biathlon
- Club: Dynamo Omsk

Olympic Games
- Teams: 1 (1980)
- Medals: 1 (1 gold)

World Championships
- Teams: 4 (1978, 1979, 1981, 1982)
- Medals: 3 (0 gold)

World Cup
- Seasons: 5 (1977/78–1981/82)
- Individual victories: 2
- Individual podiums: 6
Medal record
Men's biathlon
Representing Soviet Union
Olympic Games
Gold medal – first place	1980 Lake Placid	4 × 7.5 km relay
World Championships
Bronze medal – third place	1979 Ruhpolding	4 × 7.5 km relay
Bronze medal – third place	1981 Lahti	4 × 7.5 km relay
Bronze medal – third place	1982 Minsk	4 × 7.5 km relay

Vladimir Mikhaylovich Barnashov (Russian: Владимир Михайлович Барнашов; born 26 February 1951) is a Soviet former biathlete.

== Life and career ==
Barnashov was born in the village of Ryazany, Muromtsevsky District, Omsk Oblast

He trained at Dynamo sports society and was a member of the USSR National Biathlon Team from 1977. At the 1980 Olympics in Lake Placid he won a gold medal with the Soviet relay team. He was also a bronze medalist in the USSR 4 × 7.5 km relay team at the 1979, 1981 and 1982 Biathlon World Championships. In the overall World Cup he came third overall in the 1978–79 season behind Klaus Siebert and Frank Ullrich.

He was a coach of the USSR National Biathlon Team between 1984 and 1992, training six Olympic Champions in biathlon and becoming the Honoured Trainer of the USSR in 1988.

Barnashov graduated from Omsk State Institute for Physical Culture in 1980, and is currently head coach of Russian biathlon team.

== Honours and awards ==
Barnashov was awarded the Order of the Badge of Honour in 1980, and in 1988 he received the Medal "For Labour Valour". Between 1992 and 1998 Barnashov was the head coach of the Croatian National Cross-Country Skiing Team.

He was also awarded the Medal of the Order of Merit for the Fatherland, 2nd class (October 21, 2010), for the successful preparation of the athletes who achieved high sport achievements at the XXI Olympic Winter Games of 2010 in Vancouver, Canada.

Barnashov has also been given the honorary sports titles of Honored Master of Sports, Honored coach of the USSR and Honoured Coach of Russia.

== Biathlon results ==
All results are sourced from the International Biathlon Union.

=== Olympic Games ===
1 medal (1 gold)

Event	Individual	Sprint	Relay
(United States) 1980 Lake Placid	7th	—	Gold

=== World Championships ===
3 medals (3 bronze)

Event	Individual	Sprint	Relay
(Austria) 1978 Hochfilzen	10th	4th	4th
(West Germany) 1979 Ruhpolding	16th	24th	Bronze
(Finland) 1981 Lahti	13th	—	Bronze
(Soviet Union) 1982 Minsk	25th	6th	Bronze

*During Olympic seasons competitions are only held for those events not included in the Olympic program.

=== Individual victories ===
2 victories (1 In, 1 Sp)

Season	Date	Location	Discipline	Level
1977–78; 1 victory (1 Sp)	2 April 1978	(Finland) Sodankylä	10 km sprint	Biathlon World Cup
1978–79; 1 victory (1 In)	23 January 1979	(Italy) Antholz-Anterselva	20 km individual	Biathlon World Cup

*Results are from UIPMB and IBU races which include the Biathlon World Cup, Biathlon World Championships and the Winter Olympic Games.
