= Anatoly Alyabyev =

Soviet biathlete (1951–2022)

Personal information
- Full name: Anatoly Nikolayevich Alyabyev
- Born: 12 December 1951 Danilkovo, Velsky District, Arkhangelsk Oblast, Russin SFSR, USSR
- Died: 11 January 2022 (aged 70) Saint Petersburg, Russia

Sport

Professional information
- Sport: Biathlon
- Club: SKA St. Petersburg

Olympic Games
- Teams: 1 (1980)
- Medals: 3 (2 gold)

World Championships
- Teams: 2 (1981, 1982)
- Medals: 2 (0 gold)

World Cup
- Seasons: 5 (1977/78–1981/82)
- Individual victories: 2
- Individual podiums: 5
Medal record
Men's biathlon
Representing Soviet Union
Olympic Games
Gold medal – first place	1980 Lake Placid	20 km individual
Gold medal – first place	1980 Lake Placid	4 × 7.5 km relay
Bronze medal – third place	1980 Lake Placid	10 km sprint
World Championships
Bronze medal – third place	1981 Lahti	4 × 7.5 km relay
Bronze medal – third place	1982 Minsk	4 × 7.5 km relay

Anatoly Nikolayevich Alyabyev (Russian: Анато́лий Никола́евич Аля́бьев; 12 December 1951 – 11 January 2022) was a Soviet biathlete.

== Life and career ==
Alyabyev was born in the village of Danilkovo, Velsky District, Arkhangelsk Oblast. He initially trained at Children and Youth Sport School of Spartak in Vologda, but competed as a senior while training at the Armed Forces sports society in Leningrad. At the 1980 Olympics he was, together with Frank Ullrich the dominant biathlete taking gold medals in the 20 km and on the relay and bronze in the 10 km. Alyabyev's best season came in 1980–1981, when he became second overall.

Alyabyev was awarded Order of the Red Banner of Labour (1980). He graduated from Lesgaft Military Institute of Physical Culture in 1981 and defended a dissertation for the Candidate of Pedagogical Science degree in 1997. He died from COVID-19 in Saint Petersburg on 11 January 2022, at the age of 70.

== Biathlon results ==
All results are sourced from the International Biathlon Union.

=== Olympic Games ===
3 medals (2 gold, 1 bronze)

Event	Individual	Sprint	Relay
(United States) 1980 Lake Placid	Gold	Bronze	Gold

=== World Championships ===
2 medals (2 bronze)

Event	Individual	Sprint	Relay
(Finland) 1981 Lahti	6th	7th	Bronze
(Soviet Union) 1982 Minsk	—	10th	Bronze

*During Olympic seasons competitions are only held for those events not included in the Olympic program.

=== Individual victories ===
2 victories (1 In, 1 Sp)

Season	Date	Location	Discipline	Level
1978–79; 1 victory (1 In)	30 March 1979	(Finland) Sodankylä	20 km individual	Biathlon World Cup
1980–81; 1 victory (1 Sp)	24 January 1981	(Italy) Antholz-Anterselva	10 km sprint	Biathlon World Cup

*Results are from UIPMB and IBU races which include the Biathlon World Cup, Biathlon World Championships and the Winter Olympic Games.
