= Fritz Fischer (biathlete) =

German biathlete (born 1956)

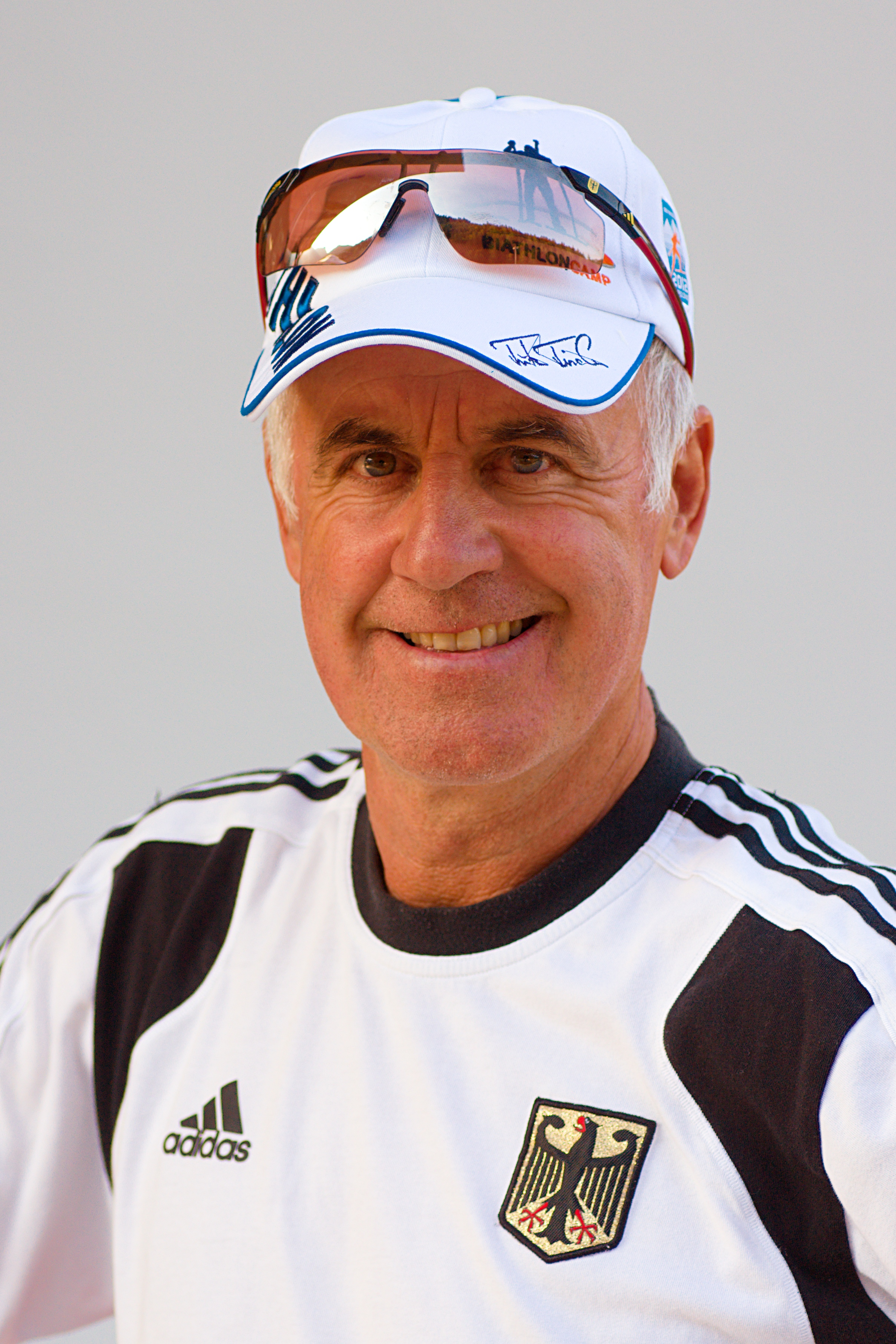

Personal information
- Full name: Friedrich Fischer
- Nickname: Fritz
- Born: 22 September 1956 (age 69) Kelheim, West Germany

Sport

Professional information
- Sport: Biathlon
- World Cup debut: 18 January 1980

Olympic Games
- Teams: 4 (1980, 1984, 1988, 1992)
- Medals: 3 (1 gold)

World Championships
- Teams: 10 (1981, 1982, 1983, 1985, 1986, 1987, 1989, 1990, 1991, 1993)
- Medals: 7 (2 gold)

World Cup
- Seasons: 14 (1979/80–1992/93)
- Individual victories: 7
- Individual podiums: 18
- Overall titles: 1 (1987–88)
Medal record
Men's biathlon
Representing Germany
Olympic Games
Gold medal – first place	1992 Albertville	4 × 7.5 km relay
World Championships
Gold medal – first place	1991 Lahti	4 × 7.5 km relay
Gold medal – first place	1993 Borovets	Team event
Representing West Germany
Olympic Games
Silver medal – second place	1988 Calgary	4 × 7.5 km relay
Bronze medal – third place	1984 Sarajevo	4 × 7.5 km relay
World Championships
Silver medal – second place	1981 Lahti	4 × 7.5 km relay
Silver medal – second place	1989 Feistritz an der Drau	Team event
Bronze medal – third place	1985 Ruhpolding	4 × 7.5 km relay
Bronze medal – third place	1987 Lake Placid	4 × 7.5 km relay
Bronze medal – third place	1989 Feistritz an der Drau	20 km individual

Friedrich "Fritz" Fischer (born 22 September 1956) is a former biathlete from Germany. He won a gold medal with Germany in the 4 × 7.5 km relay in the 1992 Winter Olympics. After ending his competitive career Fischer served as a coach for the German biathlon team for many years before retiring in 2014.

== Biathlon results ==
All results are sourced from the International Biathlon Union.

=== Olympic Games ===
3 medals (1 gold, 1 silver, 1 bronze)

Event	Individual	Sprint	Relay
(United States) 1980 Lake Placid	—	27th	—
(Socialist Federal Republic of Yugoslavia) 1984 Sarajevo	7th	8th	Bronze
(Canada) 1988 Calgary	23rd	12th	Silver
(France) 1992 Albertville	—	—	Gold

=== World Championships ===
14 medals (9 gold, 4 silver, 1 bronze)

Event	Individual	Sprint	Team	Relay
(Finland) 1981 Lahti	5th	19th	—N/a	Silver
(Soviet Union) 1982 Minsk	15th	15th	—N/a	4th
(Italy) 1983 Antholz-Anterselva	10th	13th	—N/a	4th
(West Germany) 1985 Ruhpolding	16th	6th	—N/a	Bronze
(Norway) 1986 Oslo Holmenkollen	22nd	17th	—N/a	DSQ
(United States) 1987 Lake Placid	9th	40th	—N/a	Bronze
(Austria) 1989 Feistritz	Bronze	17th	Silver	6th
(Soviet Union) 1990 Minsk	25th	46th	—	—
(Finland) 1991 Lahti	13th	6th	—	Gold
(Bulgaria) 1993 Borovets	—	—	Gold	—

*During Olympic seasons competitions are only held for those events not included in the Olympic program.
**Team was added as an event in 1989.

=== Individual victories ===
7 victories (4 In, 3 Sp)

Season	Date	Location	Discipline	Level
1980–81; 1 victory (1 In)	2 April 1981	(Sweden) Hedenäset	20 km individual	Biathlon World Cup
1983–84; 1 victory (1 In)	12 January 1984	(Switzerland) Pontresina	20 km individual	Biathlon World Cup
1986–87; 2 victories (2 Sp)	10 January 1987	(People's Republic of Bulgaria) Borovets	10 km sprint	Biathlon World Cup
1986–87; 2 victories (2 Sp)	24 January 1987	(West Germany) Ruhpolding	10 km sprint	Biathlon World Cup
1987–88; 1 victory (1 In)	17 December 1987	(Austria) Hochfilzen	20 km individual	Biathlon World Cup
1988–89; 2 victories (1 In, 1 Sp)	16 March 1989	(Norway) Steinkjer	20 km individual	Biathlon World Cup
1988–89; 2 victories (1 In, 1 Sp)	18 March 1989	(Norway) Steinkjer	10 km sprint	Biathlon World Cup

*Results are from UIPMB and IBU races which include the Biathlon World Cup, Biathlon World Championships and the Winter Olympic Games.
