= Han Jinsuo =

Chinese biathlete

Personal information
- Full name: 韩金锁
- Nationality: Chinese
- Born: 15 March 1959 (age 66)

Sport
- Sport: Biathlon

Han Jinsuo (born 15 March 1959) is a Chinese biathlete. He competed in the 10 km sprint event at the 1980 Winter Olympics.
