= Rolf Storsveen =

Norwegian biathlete (born 1959)

Medal record

Men's biathlon

Representing Norway

Olympic Games
Silver medal – second place	1984 Sarajevo	4 × 7.5 km relay

World Championships
Silver medal – second place	1982 Minsk	4 × 7.5 km relay

Rolf Storsveen (born 22 April 1959) is a former Norwegian biathlete. At the 1984 Olympics in Sarajevo, he won a silver medal with the Norwegian relay team consisting of Kjell Søbak, Odd Lirhus, and Eirik Kvalfoss. He also came in sixth place in the 20 km individual. He also won silver in the relay in the World Championships in 1982 in Minsk.
