= Patrick Howdle =

British biathlete (born 1963)

Personal information
- Nationality: British
- Born: 24 April 1963 (age 61); Driffield, England

Sport
- Sport: Biathlon

Patrick Howdle (born 24 April 1963) is a British biathlete. He competed in the relay event at the 1984 Winter Olympics.
