= Peter Hoag Jr. =

American biathlete (born 1954)

Personal information
- Nationality: American
- Born: March 17, 1954 (age 72) Minneapolis, Minnesota, United States

Sport
- Sport: Biathlon

Peter Hoag Jr. (born March 17, 1954) is an American biathlete. He competed in the 10 km sprint event at the 1980 Winter Olympics.
