= Franjo Jakovac =

Croatian biathlete (born 1961)

Personal information
- Nationality: Croatian
- Born: 24 January 1961 (age 64); Mrkopalj, Yugoslavia

Sport
- Sport: Biathlon

Franjo Jakovac (born 24 January 1961) is a Croatian biathlete. He competed in the relay event at the 1984 Winter Olympics.
