= Dmitry Vasilyev (biathlete) =

Soviet Russian biathlete

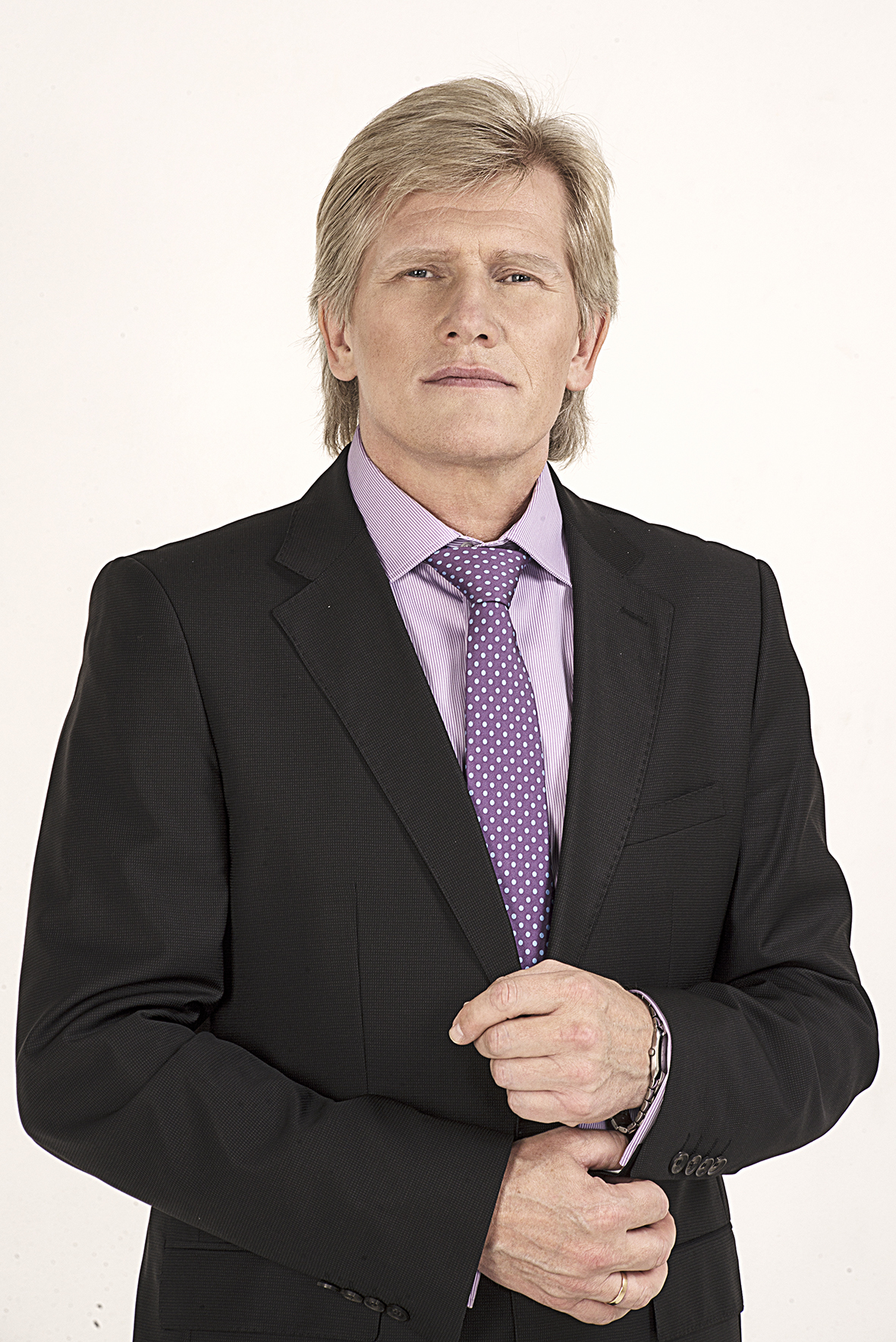
- Dmitry Vasilyev in 2013.

Personal information
- Full name: Dmitry Vladimirovich Vasilyev
- Born: 8 December 1962 (age 63) Leningrad, Russian SFSR, Soviet Union

Sport

Professional information
- Sport: Biathlon

Olympic Games
- Teams: 2 (1984, 1988)
- Medals: 2 (2 gold)

World Championships
- Teams: 2 (1986, 1987)
- Medals: 2 (1 gold)

World Cup
- Seasons: 7 (1982/83–1988/89)
- Individual victories: 1
- Individual podiums: 6
Medal record
Men's biathlon
Representing Soviet Union
Olympic Games
Gold medal – first place	1988 Calgary	4 × 7.5 km relay
Gold medal – first place	1984 Sarajevo	4 × 7.5 km relay
World Championships
Gold medal – first place	1986 Oslo	4 × 7.5 km relay
Silver medal – second place	1987 Lake Placid	4 × 7.5 km relay

Dmitry Vladimirovich Vasilyev (Russian: Дмитрий Владимирович Васильев) (born 8 December 1962 in Leningrad) is a former Russian biathlete. At the 1984 Winter Olympics in Sarajevo, Vasilyev won a gold medal with the Soviet relay team, which consisted of himself, Juri Kashkarov, Algimantas Šalna and Sergei Bulygin. He received another relay gold medal at the 1988 Winter Olympics in Calgary.

Vasilyev also won a 20 km individual World Cup race in Holmenkollen in the 1982–83 season.

In 2023, he accused Norwegian biathletes of doping, claiming that is the sole reason for their support for Russia's exclusion from the Olympics.

== Biathlon results ==
All results are sourced from the International Biathlon Union.

=== Olympic Games ===
2 medals (2 gold)

Event	Individual	Sprint	Relay
(Socialist Federal Republic of Yugoslavia) 1984 Sarajevo	32nd	—	Gold
(Canada) 1988 Calgary	—	9th	Gold

=== World Championships ===
2 medals (1 gold, 1 silver)

Event	Individual	Sprint	Relay
(Norway) 1986 Oslo Holmenkollen	8th	—	Gold
(United States) 1987 Lake Placid	—	4th	Silver

*During Olympic seasons competitions are only held for those events not included in the Olympic program.

=== Individual victories ===
1 victory (1 In)

Season	Date	Location	Discipline	Level
1982–83; 1 victory (1 In)	9 March 1983	(Norway) Oslo Holmenkollen	20 km individual	Biathlon World Cup

*Results are from UIPMB and IBU races which include the Biathlon World Cup, Biathlon World Championships and the Winter Olympic Games.
