= Eirik Kvalfoss =

Norwegian biathlete (born 1959)

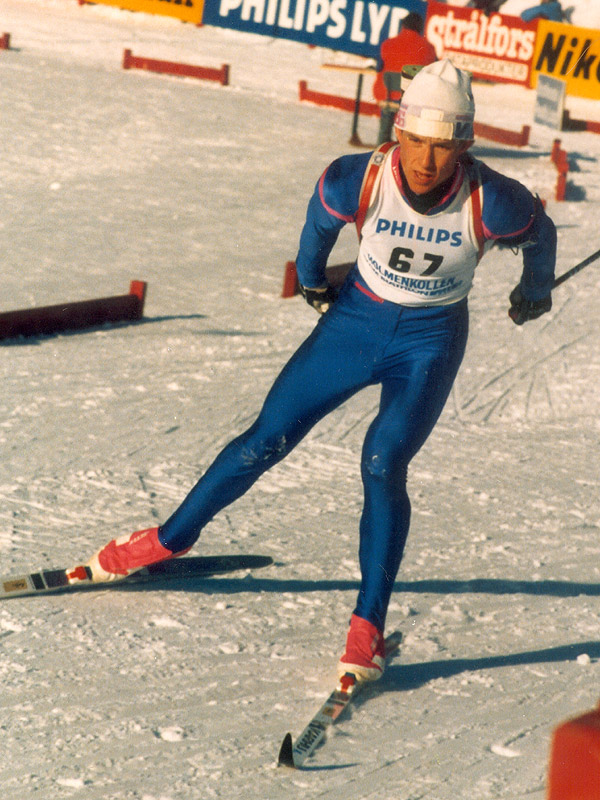
- Kvalfoss at the 1986 World Championships.

Personal information
- Full name: Eirik Kvalfoss
- Born: 25 December 1959 (age 66) Voss Municipality, Hordaland, Norway
- Height: 1.79 m (5 ft 10 in)

Sport

Professional information
- Sport: Biathlon
- Club: Voss Skiskyttarlag
- World Cup debut: 22 January 1981

Olympic Games
- Teams: 3 (1984, 1988, 1992)
- Medals: 3 (1 gold)

World Championships
- Teams: 10 (1981, 1982, 1983, 1985, 1986, 1987, 1989, 1990, 1991, 1993)
- Medals: 13 (3 gold)

World Cup
- Seasons: 14 (1980/81–1993/94)
- Individual victories: 12
- Individual podiums: 30
- Overall titles: 1 (1988–89)
Medal record
Men's biathlon
Representing Norway
Olympic Games
Gold medal – first place	1984 Sarajevo	10 km sprint
Silver medal – second place	1984 Sarajevo	4 × 7.5 km relay
Bronze medal – third place	1984 Sarajevo	20 km individual
World Championships
Gold medal – first place	1982 Minsk	10 km sprint
Gold medal – first place	1983 Antholz-Anterselva	10 km sprint
Gold medal – first place	1989 Feistritz	20 km individual
Silver medal – second place	1982 Minsk	20 km individual
Silver medal – second place	1982 Minsk	4 × 7.5 km relay
Silver medal – second place	1985 Ruhpolding	10 km sprint
Silver medal – second place	1989 Feistritz	10 km sprint
Silver medal – second place	1990 Oslo Holmenkollen	10 km sprint
Bronze medal – third place	1983 Antholz-Anterselva	4 × 7.5 km relay
Bronze medal – third place	1989 Feistritz	4 × 7.5 km relay
Bronze medal – third place	1991 Lahti	20 km individual
Bronze medal – third place	1991 Lahti	10 km sprint
Bronze medal – third place	1991 Lahti	4 × 7.5 km relay
Norwegian Championships
Gold medal – first place	1982 Steinkjer	20 km individual
Gold medal – first place	1982 Steinkjer	4 × 7.5 km relay
Gold medal – first place	1984 Vossestrand	20 km individual
Gold medal – first place	1985 Fyresdal	20 km individual
Gold medal – first place	1985 Fyresdal	10 km sprint
Gold medal – first place	1986 Geilo	20 km individual
Gold medal – first place	1986 Geilo	10 km sprint
Gold medal – first place	1986 Geilo	4 × 7.5 km relay
Gold medal – first place	1987 Tromsø	10 km sprint
Gold medal – first place	1987 Tromsø	4 × 7.5 km relay
Gold medal – first place	1988 Dombås	20 km individual
Gold medal – first place	1988 Dombås	4 × 7.5 km relay
Gold medal – first place	1989 Sørskogsbygda	4 × 7.5 km relay
Gold medal – first place	1990 Voss	Team event
Gold medal – first place	1990 Voss	4 × 7.5 km relay
Gold medal – first place	1991 Steinkjer	4 × 7.5 km relay
Gold medal – first place	1993 Hattfjelldal	20 km individual
Gold medal – first place	1994 Trondheim	4 × 7.5 km relay
Silver medal – second place	1980 Austmarka	4 × 7.5 km relay
Silver medal – second place	1982 Steinkjer	10 km sprint
Silver medal – second place	1983 Lygna	4 × 7.5 km relay
Silver medal – second place	1984 Vossestrand	10 km sprint
Silver medal – second place	1984 Vossestrand	4 × 7.5 km relay
Silver medal – second place	1985 Fyresdal	4 × 7.5 km relay
Silver medal – second place	1988 Dombås	10 km sprint
Silver medal – second place	1989 Sørskogsbygda	20 km individual
Silver medal – second place	1990 Voss	20 km individual
Silver medal – second place	1990 Voss	10 km sprint
Silver medal – second place	1991 Steinkjer	10 km sprint
Silver medal – second place	1992 Skrautvål	20 km individual
Silver medal – second place	1993 Hattfjelldal	4 × 7.5 km relay
Bronze medal – third place	1981 Bardufoss	4 × 7.5 km relay
Bronze medal – third place	1987 Tromsø	20 km individual
Bronze medal – third place	1992 Skrautvål	4 × 7.5 km relay

Eirik Kvalfoss (born 25 December 1959) is a Norwegian retired biathlete.

== Life and career ==
He won three medals during the 1984 Winter Olympics in Sarajevo: gold in the 10 km sprint, silver in relay and bronze in the 20 km individual. In total Kvalfoss won 11 individual Olympic and World Championship medals between 1982–1991, as well as several relay medals. He was awarded Morgenbladets Gullmedalje in 1983.

Kvalfoss did his higher education at the Norwegian School of Sport Sciences.

== Biathlon results ==
All results are sourced from the International Biathlon Union.

=== Olympic Games ===
3 medals (1 gold, 1 silver, 1 bronze)

Event	Individual	Sprint	Relay
(Socialist Federal Republic of Yugoslavia) 1984 Sarajevo	Bronze	Gold	Silver
(Canada) 1988 Calgary	6th	20th	6th
(France) 1992 Albertville	27th	47th	5th

=== World Championships ===
13 medals (3 gold, 5 silver, 5 bronze)

Event	Individual	Sprint	Team	Relay
(Finland) 1981 Lahti	17th	8th	—N/a	4th
(Soviet Union) 1982 Minsk	Silver	Gold	—N/a	Silver
(Italy) 1983 Antholz-Anterselva	14th	Gold	—N/a	Bronze
(West Germany) 1985 Ruhpolding	26th	Silver	—N/a	4th
(Norway) 1986 Oslo Holmenkollen	25th	12th	—N/a	5th
(United States) 1987 Lake Placid	17th	41st	—N/a	4th
(Austria) 1989 Feistritz	Gold	Silver	—	Bronze
(Soviet Union) 1990 Minsk	10th	Silver	—	4th
(Finland) 1991 Lahti	Bronze	Bronze	—	Bronze
(Bulgaria) 1993 Borovets	4th	4th	—	9th

*During Olympic seasons competitions are only held for those events not included in the Olympic program.
**Team was added as an event in 1989.

=== Individual victories ===
14 victories (4 In, 10 Sp)

Season	Date	Location	Discipline	Level
1980–81; 2 victories (1 In, 1 Sp)	22 January 1981	(Italy) Antholz-Anterselva	20 km individual	Biathlon World Cup
1980–81; 2 victories (1 In, 1 Sp)	4 April 1981	(Sweden) Hedenäset	10 km sprint	Biathlon World Cup
1981–82; 1 victory (1 Sp)	13 February 1982	(Soviet Union) Minsk	10 km sprint	Biathlon World Championships
1982–83; 2 victories (2 Sp)	28 January 1983	(West Germany) Ruhpolding	10 km sprint	Biathlon World Cup
1982–83; 2 victories (2 Sp)	26 February 1983	(Italy) Antholz-Anterselva	10 km sprint	Biathlon World Championships
1983–84; 3 victories (3 Sp)	14 January 1984	(Switzerland) Pontresina	10 km sprint	Biathlon World Cup
1983–84; 3 victories (3 Sp)	14 February 1984	(Socialist Federal Republic of Yugoslavia) Sarajevo	10 km sprint	Winter Olympic Games
1983–84; 3 victories (3 Sp)	8 March 1984	(Norway) Oslo Holmenkollen	10 km sprint	Biathlon World Cup
1987–88; 2 victories (1 In, 1 Sp)	15 March 1988	(Finland) Keuruu	10 km sprint	Biathlon World Cup
1987–88; 2 victories (1 In, 1 Sp)	17 March 1988	(Finland) Jyväskylä	20 km individual	Biathlon World Cup
1988–89; 2 victories (1 In, 1 Sp)	7 February 1989	(Austria) Feistritz	20 km individual	Biathlon World Championships
1988–89; 2 victories (1 In, 1 Sp)	4 March 1989	(Finland) Hämeenlinna	10 km sprint	Biathlon World Cup
1989–90; 1 victory (1 In)	15 March 1990	(Finland) Kontiolahti	20 km individual	Biathlon World Cup
1990–91; 1 victory (1 Sp)	16 March 1991	(Canada) Canmore	10 km sprint	Biathlon World Cup

*Results are from UIPMB and IBU races which include the Biathlon World Cup, Biathlon World Championships and the Winter Olympic Games.
