= Tommy Höglund =

Swedish biathlete (born 1961)

Personal information
- Nationality: Swedish
- Born: 2 April 1961 (age 64); Malung, Sweden

Sport
- Sport: Biathlon

Tommy Höglund (born 2 April 1961) is a Swedish former biathlete. He competed in the relay event at the 1984 Winter Olympics.

Höglund was born in Malung and represented Lima SKG.
