= Arto Sutinen =

Finnish biathlete

Personal information
- Nationality: Finnish
- Born: 10 March 1954 (age 71); Suonenjoki, Finland

Sport
- Sport: Biathlon

Arto Sutinen (born 10 March 1954) is a Finnish biathlete. He competed in the 10 km sprint event at the 1980 Winter Olympics.
