= Risto Punkka =

Finnish biathlete

Personal information
- Nationality: Finnish
- Born: 19 March 1957; Lemi, Finland
- Died: July 2014

Sport
- Sport: Biathlon

Risto Punkka (19 March 1957 – July 2014) was a Finnish biathlete. He competed in the 10 km sprint event at the 1984 Winter Olympics.
