= Algimantas Šalna =

Lithuanian biathlete

Personal information
- Full name: Algimantas Šalna
- Nickname: Algis
- Born: 12 September 1959 (age 67) Vidiškės, Utena County, Lithuanian SSR, Soviet Union

Sport

Professional information
- Sport: Biathlon

Olympic Games
- Teams: 1 (1984)
- Medals: 1 (1 gold)

World Championships
- Teams: 3 (1982, 1983, 1985)
- Medals: 2 (2 gold)

World Cup
- Seasons: 4 (1981/82–1984/85)
- Individual victories: 4
- Individual podiums: 6
Medal record
Men's biathlon
Representing Soviet Union
Olympic Games
Gold medal – first place	1984 Sarajevo	4 × 7.5 km relay
World Championships
Gold medal – first place	1983 Antholz-Anterselva	4 × 7.5 km relay
Gold medal – first place	1985 Ruhpolding	4 × 7.5 km relay

Algimantas Šalna (also transliterated Shalna, born 12 September 1959) is a former Lithuanian, Soviet biathlete.

Šalna won gold medals during the World Championships as a relayist in 1983 and 1985. As a member of the Soviet relay team, he won a gold medal at the 1984 Winter Olympics – he was the first Lithuanian-born athlete to win a medal in the Winter Olympics. As an individual he placed fifth in its 10 km competition. He moved to the U.S. in 1991 and coached the U.S. Olympic biathlon teams of 1994, 1998, 2002, and 2006. In 2012 Šalna opened a bagel shop in Burlington, Vermont called The Bagel Place.

== Biathlon results ==
All results are sourced from the International Biathlon Union.

=== Olympic Games ===
1 medal (1 gold)

Event	Individual	Sprint	Relay
(Socialist Federal Republic of Yugoslavia) 1984 Sarajevo	—	5th	Gold

=== World Championships ===
2 medals (2 gold)

Event	Individual	Sprint	Team	Relay
(Soviet Union) 1982 Minsk	14th	11th	—N/a	—
(Italy) 1983 Antholz-Anterselva	20th	7th	—N/a	Gold
(West Germany) 1985 Ruhpolding	9th	17th	—N/a	Gold

*During Olympic seasons competitions are only held for those events not included in the Olympic program.
**Team was added as an event in 1989.

=== Individual victories ===
4 victories (1 In, 3 Sp)

Season	Date	Location	Discipline	Level
1982–83; 3 victories (1 In, 2 Sp)	11 February 1983	(Italy) Antholz-Anterselva	10 km sprint	Biathlon World Cup
1982–83; 3 victories (1 In, 2 Sp)	4 March 1983	(Finland) Lahti	10 km sprint	Biathlon World Cup
1982–83; 3 victories (1 In, 2 Sp)	5 March 1983	(Finland) Lahti	20 km individual	Biathlon World Cup
1983–84; 1 victory (1 Sp)	7 January 1984	(Sweden) Falun	10 km sprint	Biathlon World Cup

*Results are from UIPMB and IBU races which include the Biathlon World Cup, Biathlon World Championships and the Winter Olympic Games.
