= Keijo Kuntola =

Finnish biathlete

Personal information
- Nationality: Finnish
- Born: 28 February 1954 (age 71); Kurikka, Finland

Sport
- Sport: Biathlon

Keijo Kuntola (born 28 February 1954) is a Finnish biathlete. He competed in the 10 km sprint event at the 1980 Winter Olympics.
