= Ralf Göthel =

East German biathlete

Medal record

Representing East Germany

Men's biathlon

World Championships
Silver medal – second place	1985 Ruhpolding	Relay

Ralf Göthel is a former East German biathlete who won a silver medal at the Biathlon World Championships 1985 in Ruhpolding. He represented the sports club SG Dynamo Zinnwald / Sportvereinigung (SV) Dynamo.
