= Peter Angerer =

German biathlete (born 1959)

Personal information
- Full name: Peter Angerer
- Born: 14 July 1959 (age 67) Siegsdorf, West Germany
- Height: 1.78 m (5 ft 10 in)

Sport

Professional information
- Sport: Biathlon
- Club: SC Hammer
- World Cup debut: 18 January 1980
- Retired: 19 March 1988

Olympic Games
- Teams: 3 (1980, 1984, 1988)
- Medals: 5 (1 gold)

World Championships
- Teams: 6 (1981, 1982, 1983, 1985, 1986, 1987)
- Medals: 5 (0 gold)

World Cup
- Seasons: 8 (1980/81–1987/88)
- Individual victories: 10
- Individual podiums: 24
- Overall titles: 1 (1982–83)
Medal record
Men's biathlon
Representing West Germany
Olympic Games
Gold medal – first place	1984 Sarajevo	20 km individual
Silver medal – second place	1984 Sarajevo	10 km sprint
Silver medal – second place	1988 Calgary	4 × 7.5 km relay
Bronze medal – third place	1980 Lake Placid	4 × 7.5 km relay
Bronze medal – third place	1984 Sarajevo	4 × 7.5 km relay
World Championships
Silver medal – second place	1981 Lahti	4 × 7.5 km relay
Silver medal – second place	1983 Antholz-Anterselva	10 km sprint
Bronze medal – third place	1983 Antholz-Anterselva	20 km individual
Bronze medal – third place	1985 Ruhpolding	4 × 7.5 km relay
Bronze medal – third place	1987 Lake Placid	4 × 7.5 km relay

Peter Angerer (born 14 July 1959) is a former West German biathlete.

== Career ==
At the 1984 Winter Olympic Games in Sarajevo he won the gold medal in the 20 km individual. In addition he won silver in the 10 km sprint and bronze with the West German relay team. Previously at the 1980 Winter Olympic Games in Lake Placid he won a relay bronze medal and at the 1988 Winter Olympic Games in Calgary the relay team won silver. In addition to winning five World Championship medals and 24 individual World Cup races, Angerer won the overall World Cup in 1983.

Angerer won twice at the Holmenkollen ski festival biathlon competition with wins in the 20 km individual in 1984 and 1985.

At the 1986 World Championships, Angerer finished second in the individual and came third with the relay team. Subsequently, Angerer tested positive for a doping offence that turned out to be the result of a flu remedy.

Angerer retired as an athlete after the 1987–88 season.

Today, Angerer runs a skiing school in Ruhpolding.

== Biathlon results ==
All results are sourced from the International Biathlon Union.

=== Olympic Games ===
5 medals (1 gold, 2 silver, 2 bronze)

Event	Individual	Sprint	Relay
(United States) 1980 Lake Placid	27th	8th	Bronze
(Socialist Federal Republic of Yugoslavia) 1984 Sarajevo	Gold	Silver	Bronze
(Canada) 1988 Calgary	10th	10th	Silver

=== World Championships ===
5 medals (2 silver, 3 bronze)

Event	Individual	Sprint	Relay
(Finland) 1981 Lahti	16th	6th	Silver
(Soviet Union) 1982 Minsk	19th	31st	4th
(Italy) 1983 Antholz-Anterselva	Bronze	Silver	4th
(West Germany) 1985 Ruhpolding	10th	8th	Bronze
(Norway) 1986 Oslo Holmenkollen	35th	DSQ	DSQ
(United States) 1987 Lake Placid	7th	30th	Bronze

*During Olympic seasons competitions are only held for those events not included in the Olympic program.

=== Individual victories ===
11 victories (8 In, 3 Sp)

Season	Date	Location	Discipline	Level
1982–83; 1 victory (1 In)	27 January 1983	(West Germany) Ruhpolding	20 km individual	Biathlon World Cup
1983–84; 4 victories (3 In, 1 Sp)	19 January 1984	(West Germany) Ruhpolding	20 km individual	Biathlon World Cup
1983–84; 4 victories (3 In, 1 Sp)	21 January 1984	(West Germany) Ruhpolding	10 km sprint	Biathlon World Cup
1983–84; 4 victories (3 In, 1 Sp)	11 February 1984	(Socialist Federal Republic of Yugoslavia) Sarajevo	20 km individual	Winter Olympic Games
1983–84; 4 victories (3 In, 1 Sp)	7 March 1984	(Norway) Oslo Holmenkollen	20 km individual	Biathlon World Cup
1984–85; 2 victories (2 In)	17 January 1985	(East Germany) Oberhof	20 km individual	Biathlon World Cup
1984–85; 2 victories (2 In)	7 March 1985	(Norway) Oslo Holmenkollen	20 km individual	Biathlon World Cup
1985–86; 3 victories (2 In, 1 Sp)	18 January 1986	(Italy) Antholz-Anterselva	10 km sprint	Biathlon World Cup
1985–86; 3 victories (2 In, 1 Sp)	30 January 1986	(East Germany) Oberhof	20 km individual	Biathlon World Cup
1985–86; 3 victories (2 In, 1 Sp)	8 March 1986	(Finland) Lahti	20 km individual	Biathlon World Cup
1986–87; 1 victory (1 Sp)	14 March 1987	(Norway) Lillehammer	10 km sprint	Biathlon World Cup

*Results are from UIPMB and IBU races which include the Biathlon World Cup, Biathlon World Championships and the Winter Olympic Games.
