= Frank Ullrich =

German biathlete and politician

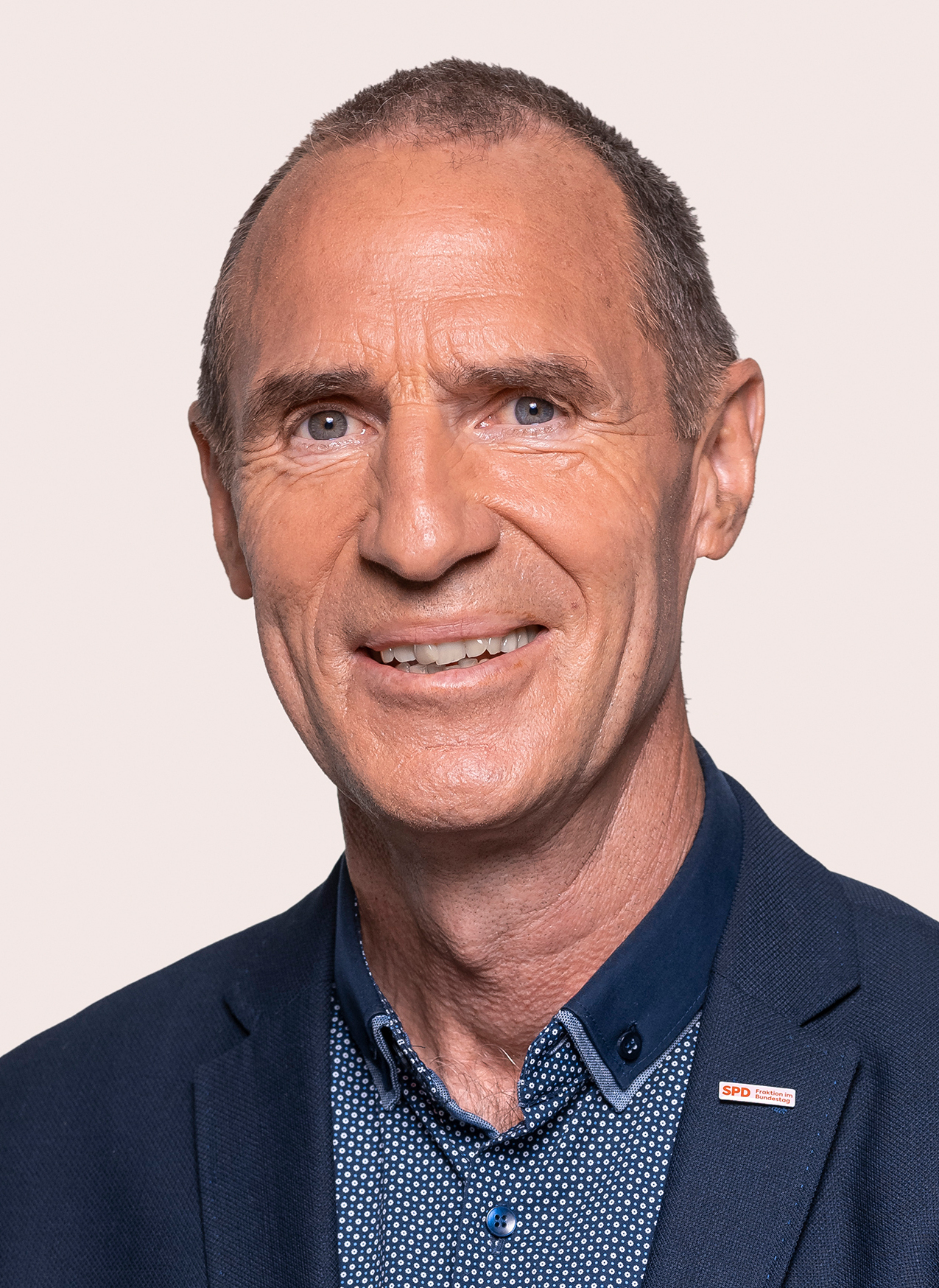
- Ullrich in 2021

Personal information
- Full name: Frank Ullrich
- Born: 24 January 1958 (age 68) Trusetal, East Germany
- Height: 1.85 m (6 ft 1 in)

Sport

Professional information
- Sport: Biathlon
- Club: ASK Vorwärts Oberhof
- World Cup debut: 13 January 1978

Olympic Games
- Teams: 3 (1976, 1980, 1984)
- Medals: 4 (1 gold)

World Championships
- Teams: 6 (1977, 1978, 1979, 1981, 1982, 1983)
- Medals: 14 (9 gold)

World Cup
- Seasons: 7 (1977/78–1983/84)
- Individual victories: 17
- Individual podiums: 28
- Overall titles: 4 (1977–78, 1979–80, 1980–81, 1981–82)
Medal record
Men's biathlon
Representing East Germany
Olympic Games
Gold medal – first place	1980 Lake Placid	10 km sprint
Silver medal – second place	1980 Lake Placid	20 km individual
Silver medal – second place	1980 Lake Placid	4 × 7.5 km relay
Bronze medal – third place	1976 Innsbruck	4 × 7.5 km relay
World Championships
Gold medal – first place	1978 Hochfilzen	10 km sprint
Gold medal – first place	1978 Hochfilzen	4 × 7.5 km relay
Gold medal – first place	1979 Ruhpolding	10 km sprint
Gold medal – first place	1979 Ruhpolding	4 × 7.5 km relay
Gold medal – first place	1981 Lahti	10 km sprint
Gold medal – first place	1981 Lahti	4 × 7.5 km relay
Gold medal – first place	1982 Minsk	20 km individual
Gold medal – first place	1982 Minsk	4 × 7.5 km relay
Gold medal – first place	1983 Antholz-Anterselva	20 km individual
Silver medal – second place	1978 Hochfilzen	20 km individual
Silver medal – second place	1981 Lahti	20 km individual
Silver medal – second place	1982 Minsk	10 km sprint
Silver medal – second place	1983 Antholz-Anterselva	4 × 7.5 km relay
Bronze medal – third place	1977 Lillehammer	4 × 7.5 km relay

Frank Ullrich (German pronunciation: [fʁaŋk ˈʊlʁɪç], audio; born 24 January 1958) is a German politician of the SPD and former biathlete and trainer of the German national team. From 2021 to 2025, he was a member of the Bundestag.

== Career ==
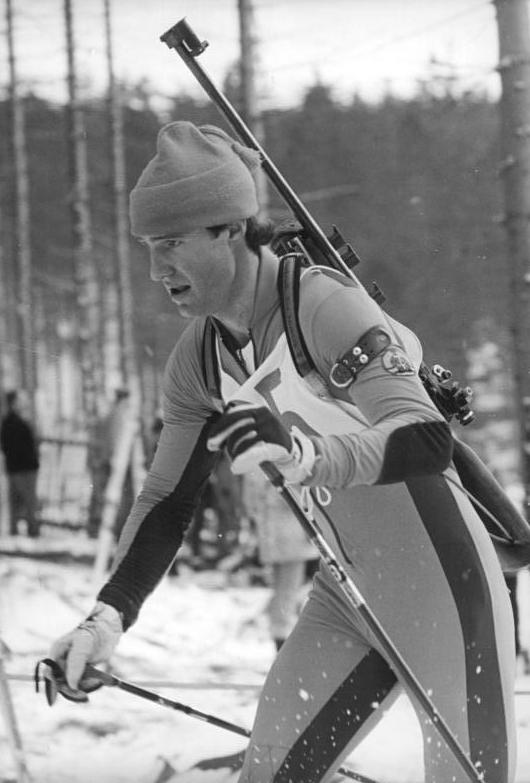
Ullrich in 1982

Biathlon was in Ullrich's family as his father was a biathlon referee. His first appearance was in 1967 at the GDR Children Championships. In 1972, he placed second over 5 km at the Spartakiad, in 1975 he became Youth World Champion in relay. He won a bronze medal at the 1976 Winter Olympics with the 4 × 7.5 km relay team. At the 1980 Winter Olympics he won 3 medals with silvers in the 20 km individual and the 4 × 7.5 km relay and a gold medal in the 10 km sprint, an event he dominated at world level between 1978 and 1981.

In 1982 his wife fell ill and died, soon after which he switched to training. He undertook a period of study at the National Academy for Body Culture and then, in 1987, became the trainer of the East Germany national team, and, following German reunification, national trainer for the sprint.

Speaking to Ullrich's dominance in the World Cup, even though he retired in the mid-80s, only five male biathletes have surpassed him in terms of World Cup victories. Sven Fischer won his 17th World Cup victory on 18 March 2000, Ole Einar Bjørndalen won his on 12 January 2001, Raphaël Poirée won on 18 January 2002, whilst Emil Hegle Svendsen won on 2 December 2010 and Martin Fourcade won on 12 January 2013.

== Politics ==
Ullrich, who has a working class background and whose grandfather was a "passionate social democrat", was a direct candidate for the SPD in the 2021 German federal election. He won his electoral constituency (Suhl – Schmalkalden-Meiningen – Hildburghausen – Sonneberg in Thuringia) with 33.5%, making him a member of the 20th Bundestag. The local election was observed closely by the German public because Ullrich ran against Hans-Georg Maaßen, the controversial former head of the German domestic intelligence service. In 2024, Ulrich announced he will not run again for Bundestag.

== Biathlon results ==
All results are sourced from the International Biathlon Union.

=== Olympic Games ===
4 medals (1 gold, 2 silver, 1 bronze)

Event	Individual	Sprint	Relay
(Austria) 1976 Innsbruck	—	—N/a	Bronze
(United States) 1980 Lake Placid	Silver	Gold	Silver
(Socialist Federal Republic of Yugoslavia) 1984 Sarajevo	5th	17th	4th

*Sprint was added as an event in 1980.

=== World Championships ===
14 medals (9 gold, 4 silver, 1 bronze)

Event	Individual	Sprint	Relay
(Norway) 1977 Lillehammer	—	—	Bronze
(Austria) 1978 Hochfilzen	Silver	Gold	Gold
(West Germany) 1979 Ruhpolding	4th	Gold	Gold
(Finland) 1981 Lahti	Silver	Gold	Gold
(Soviet Union) 1982 Minsk	Gold	Silver	Gold
(Italy) 1983 Antholz-Anterselva	Gold	8th	Silver

*During Olympic seasons competitions are only held for those events not included in the Olympic program.

=== Individual victories ===
17 victories (6 In, 11 Sp)

Season	Date	Location	Discipline	Level
1977–78; 3 victories (1 In, 2 Sp)	22 February 1978	(Italy) Antholz-Anterselva	20 km individual	Biathlon World Cup
1977–78; 3 victories (1 In, 2 Sp)	4 March 1978	(Austria) Hochfilzen	10 km sprint	Biathlon World Championships
1977–78; 3 victories (1 In, 2 Sp)	27 March 1978	(Soviet Union) Murmansk	10 km sprint	Biathlon World Cup
1978–79; 1 victory (1 Sp)	31 January 1979	(West Germany) Ruhpolding	10 km sprint	Biathlon World Championships
1979–80; 5 victories (1 In, 4 Sp)	19 January 1980	(West Germany) Ruhpolding	10 km sprint	Biathlon World Cup
1979–80; 5 victories (1 In, 4 Sp)	26 January 1980	(Italy) Antholz-Anterselva	10 km sprint	Biathlon World Cup
1979–80; 5 victories (1 In, 4 Sp)	19 February 1980	(United States) Lake Placid	10 km sprint	Winter Olympic Games
1979–80; 5 victories (1 In, 4 Sp)	22 March 1980	(Sweden) Hedenäset	10 km sprint	Biathlon World Cup
1979–80; 5 victories (1 In, 4 Sp)	27 March 1980	(Soviet Union) Murmansk	20 km individual	Biathlon World Cup
1980–81; 2 victories (2 Sp)	31 January 1981	(West Germany) Ruhpolding	10 km sprint	Biathlon World Cup
1980–81; 2 victories (2 Sp)	14 February 1981	(Finland) Lahti	10 km sprint	Biathlon World Championships
1981–82; 4 victories (2 In, 2 Sp)	16 January 1982	(Switzerland) Egg am Etzel	10 km sprint	Biathlon World Cup
1981–82; 4 victories (2 In, 2 Sp)	23 January 1982	(Italy) Antholz-Anterselva	10 km sprint	Biathlon World Cup
1981–82; 4 victories (2 In, 2 Sp)	28 January 1982	(West Germany) Ruhpolding	20 km individual	Biathlon World Cup
1981–82; 4 victories (2 In, 2 Sp)	10 February 1982	(Soviet Union) Minsk	20 km individual	Biathlon World Championships
1982–83; 2 victories (2 In)	9 February 1983	(Italy) Antholz-Anterselva	20 km individual	Biathlon World Cup
1982–83; 2 victories (2 In)	24 February 1983	(Italy) Antholz-Anterselva	20 km individual	Biathlon World Championships

*Results are from UIPMB and IBU races which include the Biathlon World Cup, Biathlon World Championships and the Winter Olympic Games.
