= Holger Wick =

German biathlete (born 1962)

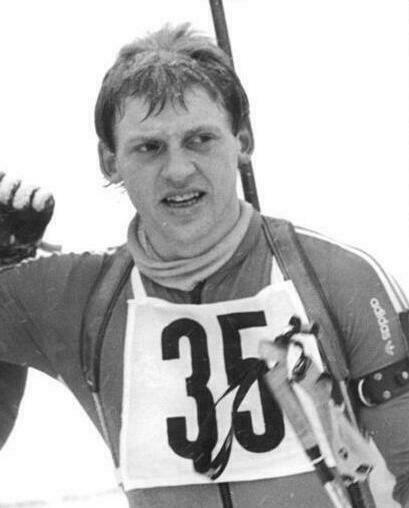
- Wick in 1984

Personal information
- Nationality: German
- Born: 12 September 1962 (age 63) Gotha, East Germany

Sport
- Sport: Biathlon

Holger Wick (born 12 September 1962) is a German former biathlete. He competed in the 20 km individual event at the 1984 Winter Olympics.
