= Toivo Mäkikyrö =

Finnish biathlete

Personal information
- Nationality: Finnish
- Born: 29 January 1957 (age 68); Pello, Finland

Sport
- Sport: Biathlon

Toivo Mäkikyrö (born 29 January 1957) is a Finnish biathlete. He competed in the 10 km sprint event at the 1984 Winter Olympics.
