= Biathlon World Championships 1981 =

1981 edition of the Biathlon World Championships

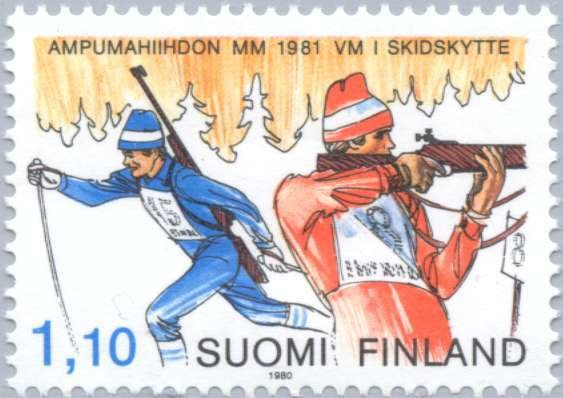
- Biathlon World Championships 1981 stamp
- Host city: Lahti
- Country: Finland
- Events: 3
- Opening: 12 March 1981
- Closing: 15 March 1981

The 18th Biathlon World Championships were held in 1981 in Lahti, Finland.

== Men's results ==
=== 20 km individual ===
Medal	Name	Nation	Penalties	Result
1st place, gold medalist(s)	Heikki Ikola	FIN	0	1:13:07.2
2nd place, silver medalist(s)	Frank Ullrich	GDR	2	1:14:09.6
3rd place, bronze medalist(s)	Erkki Antila	FIN	3	1:14:51.1

=== 10 km sprint ===
Medal	Name	Nation	Penalties	Result
1st place, gold medalist(s)	Frank Ullrich	GDR	1	33:08.5
2nd place, silver medalist(s)	Erkki Antila	FIN	0	33:10.1
3rd place, bronze medalist(s)	Yvon Mougel	FRA	0	33:13.5

=== 4 × 7.5 km relay ===
Medal	Name	Nation	Penalties	Result
1st place, gold medalist(s)	East Germany Mathias Jung; Matthias Jacob; Frank Ullrich; Eberhard Rösch	GDR		
2nd place, silver medalist(s)	West Germany Peter Angerer; Peter Schweiger; Fritz Fischer; Franz Bernreiter	FRG		
3rd place, bronze medalist(s)	Soviet Union Vladimir Alikin; Anatoly Alyabyev; Vladimir Barnashov; Vladimir Gavrikov	URS		

== Medal table ==
Place	Nation	1st place, gold medalist(s)	2nd place, silver medalist(s)	3rd place, bronze medalist(s)	Total
1	East Germany	2	1	0	3
2	Finland	1	1	1	3
3	West Germany	0	1	0	1
4	France	0	0	1	1
4	Soviet Union	0	0	1	1
