= Matthias Jacob =

East German biathlete (born 1960)

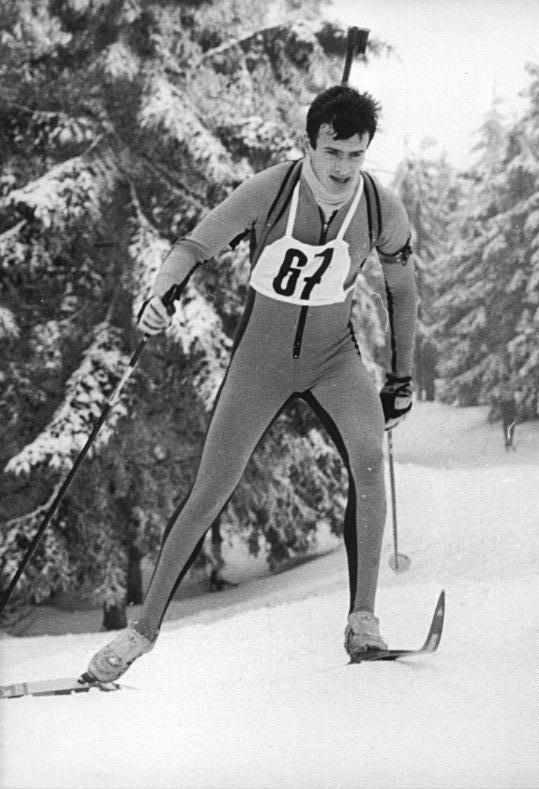

Personal information
- Full name: Matthias Jacob
- Born: 2 April 1960 (age 66) Tambach-Dietharz, East Germany

Sport

Professional information
- Sport: Biathlon
- World Cup debut: 18 January 1980

Olympic Games
- Teams: 2 (1984, 1988)
- Medals: 1 (0 gold)

World Championships
- Teams: 6 (1981, 1982, 1983, 1985, 1986, 1987)
- Medals: 7 (3 gold)

World Cup
- Seasons: 9 (1979/80–1987/88)
- Individual victories: 5
- Individual podiums: 12
Medal record
Men's biathlon
Representing East Germany
Olympic Games
Bronze medal – third place	1984 Sarajevo	10 km sprint
World Championships
Gold medal – first place	1981 Lahti	4 × 7.5 km relay
Gold medal – first place	1982 Minsk	4 × 7.5 km relay
Gold medal – first place	1987 Lake Placid	4 × 7.5 km relay
Silver medal – second place	1983 Antholz-Anterselva	4 × 7.5 km relay
Silver medal – second place	1985 Ruhpolding	4 × 7.5 km relay
Silver medal – second place	1986 Oslo	4 × 7.5 km relay
Silver medal – second place	1987 Lake Placid	10 km sprint

Matthias Jacob (born 2 April 1960) is a former East German biathlete.

== Biathlon results ==
All results are sourced from the International Biathlon Union.

=== Olympic Games ===
1 medal (1 bronze)

Event	Individual	Sprint	Relay
(Socialist Federal Republic of Yugoslavia) 1984 Sarajevo	—	Bronze	4th
(Canada) 1988 Calgary	9th	—	5th

=== World Championships ===
7 medals (3 gold, 4 silver)

Event	Individual	Sprint	Relay
(Finland) 1981 Lahti	7th	5th	Gold
(Soviet Union) 1982 Minsk	4th	17th	Gold
(Italy) 1983 Antholz-Anterselva	8th	32nd	Silver
(West Germany) 1985 Ruhpolding	20th	7th	Silver
(Norway) 1986 Oslo Holmenkollen	4th	7th	Silver
(United States) 1987 Lake Placid	24th	Silver	Gold

*During Olympic seasons competitions are only held for those events not included in the Olympic program.

=== Individual victories ===
5 victories (1 In, 4 Sp)

Season	Date	Location	Discipline	Level
1981–82; 2 victories (2 Sp)	30 January 1982	(West Germany) Ruhpolding	10 km sprint	Biathlon World Cup
1981–82; 2 victories (2 Sp)	6 March 1982	(Finland) Lahti	10 km sprint	Biathlon World Cup
1985–86; 2 victories (2 Sp)	1 February 1986	(East Germany) Oberhof	10 km sprint	Biathlon World Cup
1985–86; 2 victories (2 Sp)	15 March 1986	(Sweden) Boden	10 km sprint	Biathlon World Cup
1986–87; 1 victory (1 In)	12 March 1987	(Norway) Lillehammer	20 km individual	Biathlon World Cup

*Results are from UIPMB and IBU races which include the Biathlon World Cup, Biathlon World Championships and the Winter Olympic Games.
