= Biathlon at the 1984 Winter Olympics =

Biathlon at the XIV Olympic Winter Games
- Venue: Igman - Veliko Polje
- Dates: 11–17 February
- Competitors: 95 from 25 nations

Biathlon at the 1984 Winter Olympics consisted of three biathlon events. They were held at the Igman - Veliko Polje. The events began on 11 February and ended on 17 February 1984.

== Medal summary ==
Four nations won medals in biathlon, Norway and West Germany leading the medal table with three medals, one of each type. Eirik Kvalfoss and Peter Angerer each took three medals, also winning one of each type.

=== Medal table ===
Rank	Nation	Gold	Silver	Bronze	Total
1	Norway	1	1	1	3
1	West Germany	1	1	1	3
3	Soviet Union	1	0	0	1
4	East Germany	0	1	1	2
Totals (4 entries)		3	3	3	9

=== Events ===
Event	Gold		Silver		Bronze	
Individual	Peter Angerer; West Germany	1:11:52.7	Frank-Peter Roetsch; East Germany	1:13.21.4	Eirik Kvalfoss; Norway	1:14.02.4
Sprint	Eirik Kvalfoss; Norway	30:53.8	Peter Angerer; West Germany	31:02.4	Matthias Jacob; East Germany	31:10.5
Relay	Soviet Union; Dmitry Vasilyev; Juri Kashkarov; Algimantas Šalna; Sergei Bulygin	1:38:51.7	Norway; Odd Lirhus; Eirik Kvalfoss; Rolf Storsveen; Kjell Søbak	1:39:03.9	West Germany; Ernst Reiter; Walter Pichler; Peter Angerer; Fritz Fischer	1:39:05.1

== Participating nations ==
Twenty-three nations sent biathletes to compete in the events. Below is a list of the competing nations; in parentheses are the number of national competitors. Australia, Costa Rica, Spain and South Korea made their Olympic biathlon debuts.

- Argentina (3)
- Australia (1)
- Austria (4)
- Bulgaria (3)
- Spain (2)
- Finland (5)
- France (4)
- West Germany (4)
- Great Britain (6)
- East Germany (4)
- Hungary (5)
- Italy (5)
- Japan (4)
- South Korea (1)
- Norway (5)
- Romania (5)
- Switzerland (1)
- Sweden (5)
- Czechoslovakia (5)
- Chinese Taipei (1)
- Soviet Union (4)
- United States (6)
- Yugoslavia (6)
