= Terje Krokstad =

Norwegian biathlete

Personal information
- Full name: Terje Krokstad
- Born: 1 October 1956 (age 69) Krokstadøra, Norway

Sport

Professional information
- Sport: Biathlon
- Club: Krokstadøra IL
- World Cup debut: 13 January 1978

Olympic Games
- Teams: 2 (1980, 1984)
- Medals: 0

World Championships
- Teams: 3 (1978, 1979, 1982)
- Medals: 1 (0 gold)

World Cup
- Seasons: 8 (1977/78–1984/85)
- Individual victories: 1
- Individual podiums: 5
Medal record
Men's biathlon
Representing Norway
World Championships
Bronze medal – third place	1982 Minsk	20 km individual

Terje Krokstad (born 1 October 1956) is a former Norwegian biathlete

He hails from Krokstadøra in Snillfjord Municipality, and represented Krokstadøra IL. At the Winter Olympics he finished seventeenth in the 10 km sprint at the 1980 Winter Olympics, and eighteenth in the 10 km sprint at the 1984 Winter Olympics. His best international result is a bronze medal in the 20 km from the 1982 World Championships.
