= Vladimir Alikin =

Russian biathlete

Personal information
- Full name: Vladimir Alexandrovich Alikin
- Born: 10 May 1957 (age 69) Dolgy Mot, Nytvensky District, Perm Oblast, RSFSR, Soviet Union

Sport

Professional information
- Sport: Biathlon
- Club: Burevestnik Perm

Olympic Games
- Teams: 1 (1980)
- Medals: 2 (1 gold)

World Championships
- Teams: 3 (1979, 1981, 1982)
- Medals: 4 (0 gold)

World Cup
- Seasons: 5 (1978/79–1982/83)
- Individual victories: 1
- Individual podiums: 5
Medal record
Men's biathlon
Representing Soviet Union
Olympic Games
Gold medal – first place	1980 Lake Placid	4 × 7.5 km relay
Silver medal – second place	1980 Lake Placid	10 km sprint
World Championships
Bronze medal – third place	1979 Ruhpolding	4 × 7.5 km relay
Bronze medal – third place	1981 Lahti	4 × 7.5 km relay
Bronze medal – third place	1982 Minsk	10 km sprint
Bronze medal – third place	1982 Minsk	4 × 7.5 km relay

Vladimir Alexandrovich Alikin (Russian: Влади́мир Алекса́ндрович Али́кин; born 10 May 1957) is a Soviet former biathlete.

== Life and career ==
Alikin was born in the village of Dolgy Mot near the settlement of Novoilyinsky in the Nytvensky District of the Perm Oblast. He began cross-country skiing in 1969 at Children and Youth Sport School and biathlon in 1977. From 1979 he trained at the Armed Forces sports society in Moscow. At the 1980 Olympics in Lake Placid, New York, Alikin won a gold medal with the USSR relay team and he also won a silver medal in the sprint event. In the World Championships he has four medals: bronze in 10 km sprint in 1982, and three relay bronze medals in 1979, 1981, and 1982. He also won the 1980 Biathlon World Cup in 10 km sprint and USSR Championships in the same event.

== Biathlon results ==
All results are sourced from the International Biathlon Union.

=== Olympic Games ===
2 medals (1 gold, 1 silver)

Event	Individual	Sprint	Relay
(United States) 1980 Lake Placid	8th	Silver	Gold

=== World Championships ===
4 medals (4 bronze)

Event	Individual	Sprint	Relay
(West Germany) 1979 Ruhpolding	8th	4th	Bronze
(Finland) 1981 Lahti	24th	15th	Bronze
(Soviet Union) 1982 Minsk	13th	Bronze	Bronze

*During Olympic seasons competitions are only held for those events not included in the Olympic program.

=== Individual victories ===
1 victory (1 In)

Season	Date	Location	Discipline	Level
1980–81; 1 victory (1 In)	28 January 1981	(West Germany) Ruhpolding	20 km individual	Biathlon World Cup

*Results are from UIPMB and IBU races which include the Biathlon World Cup, Biathlon World Championships and the Winter Olympic Games.
