= Jaromír Šimůnek =

Czech biathlete (born 1955)

Personal information
- Nationality: Czech
- Born: 2 February 1955 (age 70); Semily, Czechoslovakia

Sport
- Sport: Biathlon

Jaromír Šimůnek (born 2 February 1955) is a Czech former biathlete. He competed at the 1980 Winter Olympics, the 1984 Winter Olympics and the 1988 Winter Olympics.
