= Biathlon World Championships 1983 =

Sports competition in Antholz-Anterselva, Italy

- Host city: Anterselva
- Country: Italy
- Events: 3
- Opening: 23 February 1983
- Closing: 26 February 1983

The 20th Biathlon World Championships were held in 1983 for the second time in Antholz-Anterselva, Italy.

== Men's results ==
=== 20 km individual ===
Medal	Name	Nation	Penalties	Result
1st place, gold medalist(s)	Frank Ullrich	GDR	1	1:05:00.9
2nd place, silver medalist(s)	Frank-Peter Roetsch	GDR	1	1:05:17.8
3rd place, bronze medalist(s)	Peter Angerer	FRG	2	1:06:57.3

=== 10 km sprint ===
Medal	Name	Nation	Penalties	Result
1st place, gold medalist(s)	Eirik Kvalfoss	NOR	2	31:12.3
2nd place, silver medalist(s)	Peter Angerer	FRG	0	31:31.2
3rd place, bronze medalist(s)	Alfred Eder	AUT	0	31:45.5

=== 4 × 7.5 km relay ===
Medal	Name	Nation	Penalties	Result
1st place, gold medalist(s)	Soviet Union Algimantas Šalna; Juri Kashkarov; Petr Miloradov; Sergei Bulygin	URS		
2nd place, silver medalist(s)	East Germany Frank Ullrich; Mathias Jung; Matthias Jacob; Frank-Peter Roetsch	GDR		
3rd place, bronze medalist(s)	Norway Kjell Søbak; Eirik Kvalfoss; Odd Lirhus; Øivind Nerhagen	NOR		

== Medal table ==
Place	Nation	1st place, gold medalist(s)	2nd place, silver medalist(s)	3rd place, bronze medalist(s)	Total
1	East Germany	1	2	0	3
2	Norway	1	0	1	2
3	Soviet Union	1	0	0	1
4	West Germany	0	1	1	2
5	Austria	0	0	1	1
