= Mathias Jung =

East German biathlete (born 1958)

Personal information
- Full name: Mathias Jung
- Born: 17 December 1958 (age 67) Trusetal, East Germany

Sport

Professional information
- Sport: Biathlon
- Club: ASK Vorwärts Oberhof

Olympic Games
- Teams: 1 (1980)
- Medals: 1 (0 gold)

World Championships
- Teams: 3 (1981, 1982, 1983)
- Medals: 3 (2 gold)

World Cup
- Seasons: 6 (1978/79–1983/84)
- Individual victories: 0
- Individual podiums: 2
Medal record
Men's biathlon
Representing East Germany
Olympic Games
Silver medal – second place	1980 Lake Placid	4 × 7.5 km relay
World Championships
Gold medal – first place	1981 Lahti	4 × 7.5 km relay
Gold medal – first place	1982 Minsk	4 × 7.5 km relay
Silver medal – second place	1983 Antholz-Anterselva	4 × 7.5 km relay

Mathias Jung (born 17 December 1958 in Trusetal) is a former East German biathlete.

== Biathlon results ==
All results are sourced from the International Biathlon Union.

=== Olympic Games ===
1 medal (1 silver)

Event	Individual	Sprint	Relay
(United States) 1980 Lake Placid	—	21st	Silver

=== World Championships ===
3 medals (2 gold, 1 silver)

Event	Individual	Sprint	Relay
(Finland) 1981 Lahti	4th	20th	Gold
(Soviet Union) 1982 Minsk	—	7th	Gold
(Italy) 1983 Antholz-Anterselva	25th	20th	Silver

*During Olympic seasons competitions are only held for those events not included in the Olympic program.
