= Erkki Antila =

Finnish biathlete (1954–2023)

Personal information
- Nationality: Finnish
- Born: 14 July 1954; Jurva, Finland
- Died: 28 October 2023 (aged 69)

Sport
- Sport: Biathlon

Erkki Antila (14 July 1954 – 28 October 2023) was a Finnish biathlete. He competed in the 20 km individual event at the 1980 Winter Olympics. Antila died on 28 October 2023, at the age of 69.
