= Odd Lirhus =

Norwegian biathlete (born 1956)

Personal information
- Full name: Odd Lirhus
- Nickname: Pekka
- Born: 18 September 1956 (age 69) Voss Municipality, Hordaland, Norway

Sport

Professional information
- Sport: Biathlon
- World Cup debut: 13 January 1978
- Retired: 8 March 1984

Olympic Games
- Teams: 2 (1980, 1984)
- Medals: 1 (0 gold)

World Championships
- Teams: 5 (1978, 1979, 1981, 1982, 1983)
- Medals: 5 (1 gold)

World Cup
- Seasons: 7 (1977/78–1983/84)
- Individual victories: 2
- Individual podiums: 8
Medal record
Men's biathlon
Representing Norway
Olympic Games
Silver medal – second place	1984 Sarajevo	4 × 7.5 km relay
World Championships
Gold medal – first place	1978 Hochfilzen	20 km individual
Silver medal – second place	1978 Hochfilzen	4 × 7.5 km relay
Silver medal – second place	1979 Ruhpolding	10 km sprint
Silver medal – second place	1982 Minsk	4 × 7.5 km relay
Bronze medal – third place	1983 Antholz-Anterselva	4 × 7.5 km relay

Odd Lirhus (born 18 September 1956) is a former Norwegian biathlete. At the 1984 Winter Olympics in Sarajevo he won a silver medal in the relay. He also won a gold medal in the 20 km individual at the 1978 Biathlon World Championship. In addition, he won the 20 km individual in Falun in the 1983–84 season.

After that season, Lirhus took a gap year as an active biathlete to be a coach for the Canadian biathlon team, intending to return to biathlon and compete at the World Championships in Holmenkollen. He did not, however, return.

From 2002 to 2005, Lirhus was the head coach for Norwegian women's biathlon team. Liv Grete Skjelbreid Poirée has attributed much of her success at the 2004 World Championships to him.

== Biathlon results ==
All results are sourced from the International Biathlon Union.

=== Olympic Games ===
1 medal (1 silver)

Event	Individual	Sprint	Relay
(United States) 1980 Lake Placid	23rd	7th	4th
(Socialist Federal Republic of Yugoslavia) 1984 Sarajevo	24th	—	Silver

=== World Championships ===
5 medals (1 gold, 3 silver, 1 bronze)

Event	Individual	Sprint	Relay
(Austria) 1978 Hochfilzen	Gold	6th	Silver
(West Germany) 1979 Ruhpolding	21st	Silver	4th
(Finland) 1981 Lahti	—	18th	4th
(Soviet Union) 1982 Minsk	11th	4th	Silver
(Italy) 1983 Antholz-Anterselva	5th	10th	Bronze

*During Olympic seasons competitions are only held for those events not included in the Olympic program.

=== Individual victories ===
2 victories (2 In)

Season	Date	Location	Discipline	Level
1977–78; 1 victory (1 In)	2 March 1978	(Austria) Hochfilzen	20 km individual	Biathlon World Championships
1983–84; 1 victory (1 In)	6 January 1984	(Sweden) Falun	20 km individual	Biathlon World Cup

*Results are from UIPMB and IBU races which include the Biathlon World Cup, Biathlon World Championships and the Winter Olympic Games.
