= Hedenäset =

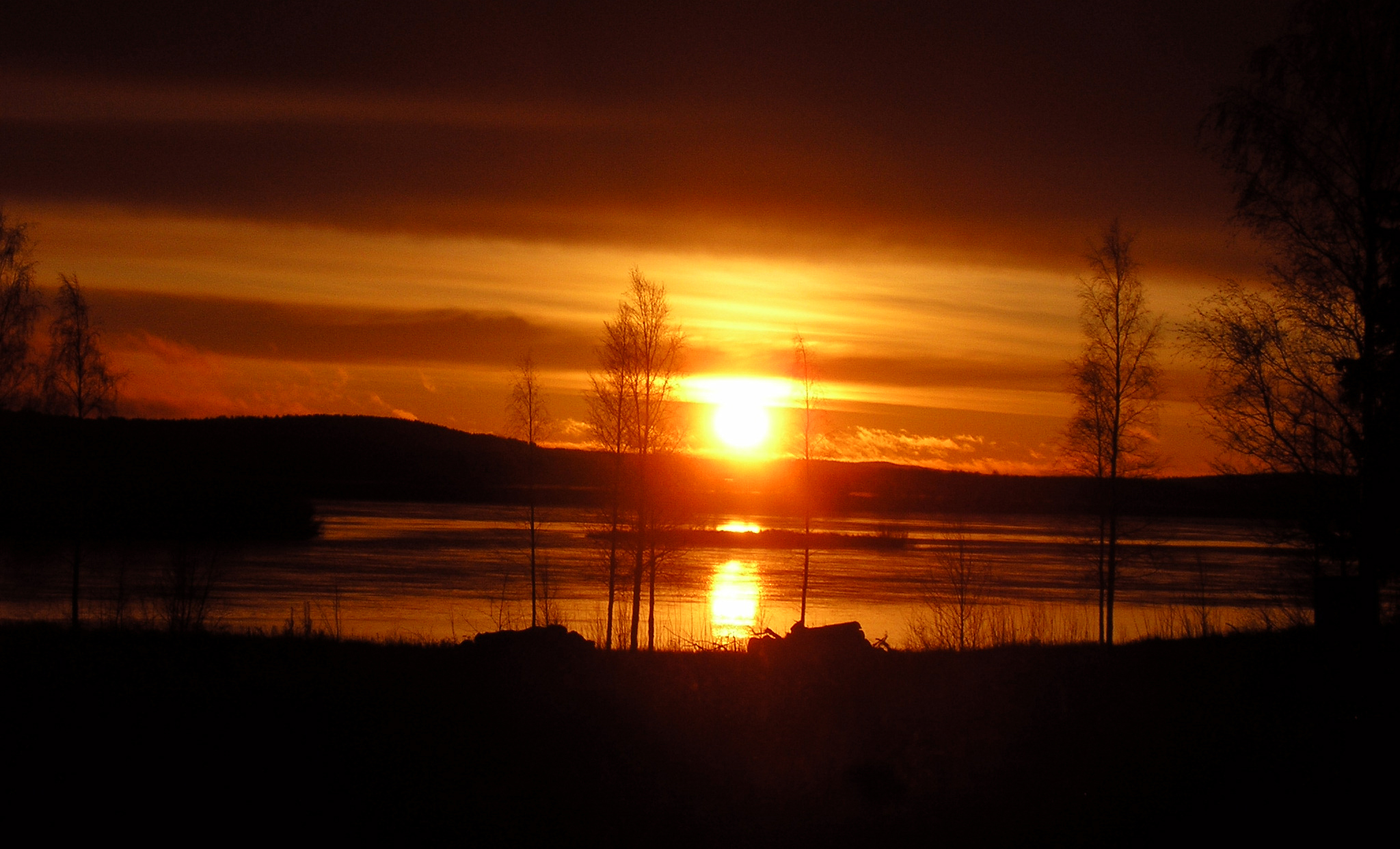
- November 2011 Sunrise in Hedenäset

- Location within Norrbotten Location within Sweden
- Coordinates: 66°14′N 23°41′E
- Country: Sweden
- Province: Norrbotten
- County: Norrbotten County
- Municipality: Övertorneå Municipality

Area
  - Total: 1.98 km^{2} (0.76 sq mi)

Population (31 December 2010)
  - Total: 270
  - Density: 136/km^{2} (350/sq mi)
- Time zone: UTC+1 (CET)
  - Summer (DST): UTC+2 (CEST)

Hedenäset (Meänkieli: Koijukylä; Finnish: Koivukylä) is a locality situated in Övertorneå Municipality, Norrbotten County, Sweden with 270 inhabitants in 2010.
