= Biathlon World Championships 1982 =

Sports competition in Minsk, Belarus

- Host city: Minsk, Byelorussian SSR
- Country: USSR
- Events: 3
- Opening: 10 February 1982
- Closing: 14 February 1982

The 19th Biathlon World Championships were held in 1982 for the second time in Minsk, Belarus, at that time part of the Soviet Union.

== Men's results ==
=== 20 km individual ===
Medal	Name	Nation	Penalties	Result
1st place, gold medalist(s)	Frank Ullrich	GDR	2	1:07:17.0
2nd place, silver medalist(s)	Eirik Kvalfoss	NOR	2	1:07:50.3
3rd place, bronze medalist(s)	Terje Krokstad	NOR	5	1:10:48.6

=== 10 km sprint ===
Medal	Name	Nation	Penalties	Result
1st place, gold medalist(s)	Eirik Kvalfoss	NOR	2	33:03.2
2nd place, silver medalist(s)	Frank Ullrich	GDR	1	33:09.1
3rd place, bronze medalist(s)	Vladimir Alikin	URS	2	33:21.5

=== 4 × 7.5 km relay ===
Medal	Name	Nation	Penalties	Result
1st place, gold medalist(s)	East Germany Frank Ullrich; Mathias Jung; Matthias Jacob; Bernd Helmich	GDR		
2nd place, silver medalist(s)	Norway Eirik Kvalfoss; Kjell Søbak; Odd Lirhus; Rolf Storsveen	NOR		
3rd place, bronze medalist(s)	Soviet Union Vladimir Alikin; Anatoly Alyabyev; Vladimir Barnashov; Viktor Semyonov	URS		

== Medal table ==
Place	Nation	1st place, gold medalist(s)	2nd place, silver medalist(s)	3rd place, bronze medalist(s)	Total
1	East Germany	2	1	0	3
2	Norway	1	2	1	4
3	Soviet Union	0	0	2	2
