= Yvon Mougel =

French biathlete (born 1955)

Personal information
- Nationality: French
- Born: 25 May 1955 (age 69); Cornimont, France

Sport
- Sport: Biathlon

Yvon Mougel (born 25 May 1955) is a French biathlete. He competed at the 1976 Winter Olympics, the 1980 Winter Olympics and the 1984 Winter Olympics.
