= Biathlon at the 1980 Winter Olympics =

Biathlon at the XIII Olympic Winter Games
- Venue: Lake Placid Olympic Sports Complex Cross Country Biathlon Center
- Dates: 16–22 February
- Competitors: 76 from 18 nations

Biathlon at the 1980 Winter Olympics consisted of three biathlon events. They were held at the Lake Placid Olympic Sports Complex Cross Country Biathlon Center. This Olympic featured the debut of the 10 kilometre sprint event. The events began on 16 February and ended on 22 February 1980.

== Medal summary ==
Three nations won medals in biathlon, with the Soviet Union topping the medal table with four medals (2 gold, 1 silver, 1 bronze). Anatoly Alyabyev led the individual medal table, with two gold medals and a bronze; Frank Ullrich also won three medals, one gold and two silvers.

=== Medal table ===
| Rank | Nation | Gold | Silver | Bronze | Total |
|---|---|---|---|---|---|
| 1 | Soviet Union | 2 | 1 | 1 | 4 |
| 2 | East Germany | 1 | 2 | 1 | 4 |
| 3 | West Germany | 0 | 0 | 1 | 1 |
| Totals (3 entries) | | 3 | 3 | 3 | 9 |

=== Events ===
| Event | Gold | | Silver | | Bronze | |
|---|---|---|---|---|---|---|
| Individual | Anatoly Alyabyev; Soviet Union | 1:08:16.31 | Frank Ullrich; East Germany | 1:08:27.79 | Eberhard Rösch; East Germany | 1:11:11.73 |
| Sprint | Frank Ullrich; East Germany | 32:10.69 | Vladimir Alikin; Soviet Union | 32:53.10 | Anatoly Alyabyev; Soviet Union | 33:09.16 |
| Relay | Soviet Union; Vladimir Alikin; Aleksandr Tikhonov; Vladimir Barnashov; Anatoly Alyabyev | 1:34:03.27 | East Germany; Mathias Jung; Klaus Siebert; Frank Ullrich; Eberhard Rösch | 1:34:56.99 | West Germany; Franz Bernreiter; Hans Estner; Peter Angerer; Gerd Winkler | 1:37:30.26 |

== Participating nations ==
Eighteen nations sent biathletes to compete in the events. Below is a list of the competing nations; in parentheses are the number of national competitors. Argentina, China and Yugoslavia made their Olympic biathlon debuts.

- Argentina (4)
- Austria (5)
- Bulgaria (2)
- China (5)
- Finland (6)
- France (5)
- West Germany (6)
- Great Britain (4)
- East Germany (4)
- Italy (5)
- Japan (4)
- Norway (5)
- Switzerland (2)
- Sweden (4)
- Czechoslovakia (4)
- Soviet Union (6)
- United States (4)
- Yugoslavia (1)
