= Biathlon World Championships =

International biathlon competitions

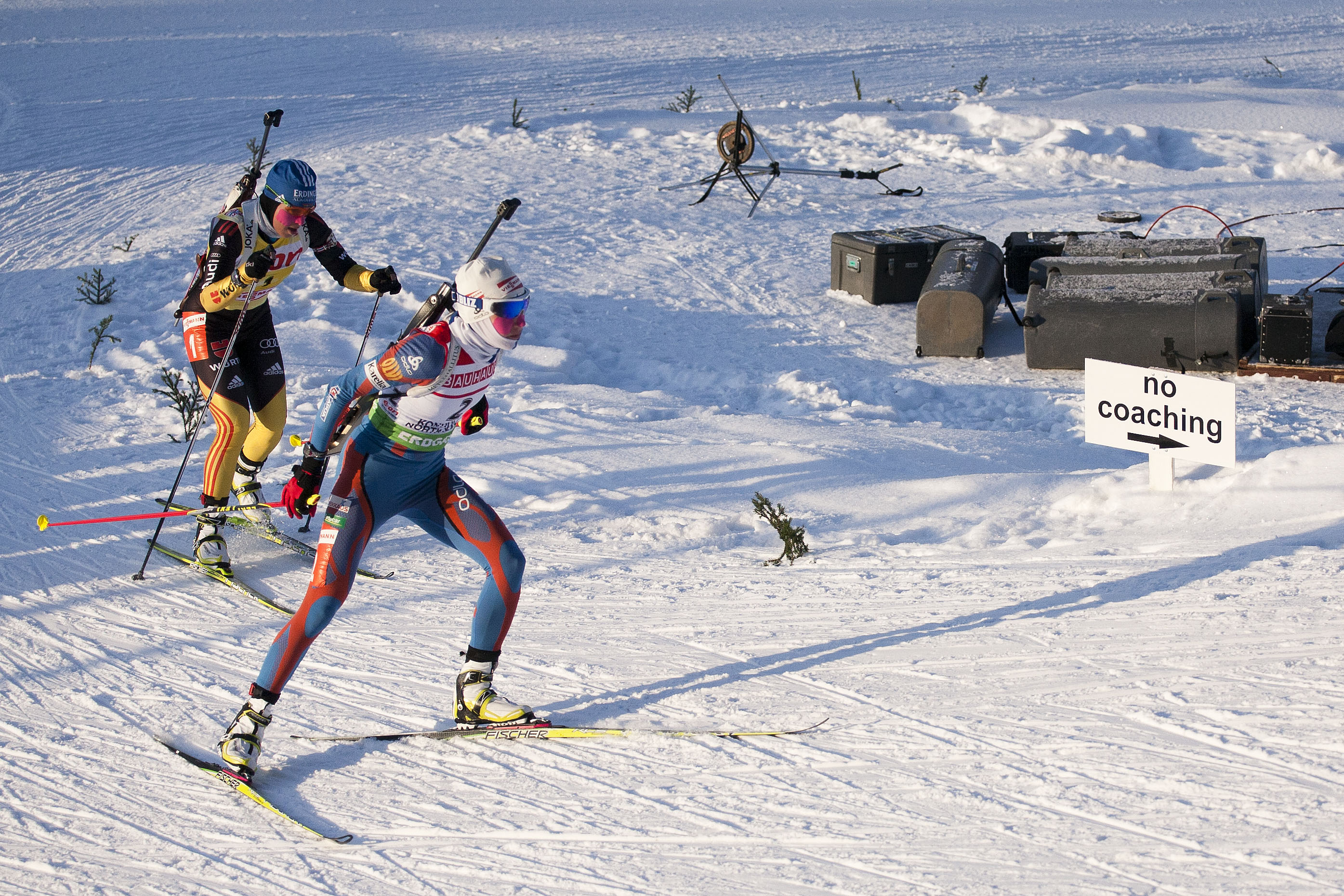
- Magdalena Neuner and Kaisa Mäkäräinen during the 2011–12 World Cup season Kontiolahti, North Karelia, Finland
- Status: active
- Genre: sporting event
- Date: February–March
- Frequency: annual
- Location: various
- Inaugurated: 1958
- Organiser: IBU
- Biathlon World Championships 2025

The first Biathlon World Championships (BWCH) was held in 1958, with individual and team contests for men. The original team event, Team (time), was held for the last time in 1965, to be replaced in 1966 by the team event, Relay (4 × 7.5 km). The number of events has grown significantly over the years. Beginning in 1984, women biathletes had their own World Championships, and finally, from 1989, both genders have been participating in joint Biathlon World Championships. In 1978 the development was enhanced by the change from the large army rifle calibre to a small bore rifle, while the range to the target was reduced from 150 to 50 meters.

== Venues ==
The Biathlon World Championships of the season takes place during February or March. Some years it has been necessary to schedule parts of the Championships at other than the main venue because of weather and/or snow conditions. Full, joint Biathlon World Championships have never been held in Olympic Winter Games seasons. Biathlon World Championships in non-IOC events, however, have been held in Olympic seasons. In 2005, the then new event of Mixed Relay (two legs done by women, two legs by men) was arranged separately from the ordinary Championships.

Past Championships:

- 1958 Saalfelden, Austria
- 1959 Courmayeur, Italy
- 1961 Umeå, Sweden
- 1962 Hämeenlinna, Finland
- 1963 Seefeld, Austria
- 1965 Elverum, Norway
- 1966 Garmisch-Partenkirchen, West Germany
- 1967 Altenberg, East Germany (first event in East Europe)
- 1969 Zakopane, Poland
- 1970 Östersund, Sweden
- 1971 Hämeenlinna, Finland
- 1973 Lake Placid, New York, United States (first event outside Europe and in the Americas)
- 1974 (Soviet Union) Minsk, USSR
- 1975 Antholz-Anterselva, Italy
- 1976 Antholz-Anterselva, Italy (Sprint)
- 1977 Vingrom, Norway
- 1978 Hochfilzen, Austria
- 1979 Ruhpolding, West Germany
- 1981 Lahti, Finland
- 1982 (Soviet Union) Minsk, USSR
- 1983 Antholz-Anterselva, Italy
- 1984 Chamonix, France (Women)
- 1985 Ruhpolding, West Germany (Men) and Egg am Etzel (near Einsiedeln), Switzerland (Women)
- 1986 Oslo, Norway (Men) and Falun, Sweden (Women)
- 1987 Lake Placid, New York, United States (Men) and Lahti, Finland (Women)
- 1988 Chamonix, France (Women)
- 1989 Feistritz an der Drau, Austria (first joint Biathlon World Championships)
- 1990 (Soviet Union) Minsk, USSR; Oslo, Norway and Kontiolahti, Finland
- 1991 Lahti, Finland
- 1992 Novosibirsk, Russia (Team; first event in Asia)
- 1993 Borovets, Bulgaria
- 1994 Canmore, Canada (Team)
- 1995 Antholz-Anterselva, Italy
- 1996 Ruhpolding, Germany
- 1997 Brezno-Osrblie, Slovakia
- 1998 Pokljuka, Slovenia (Pursuit) and Hochfilzen, Austria (Team)
- 1999 Kontiolahti, Finland and Oslo, Norway
- 2000 Oslo, Norway and Lahti, Finland
- 2001 Pokljuka, Slovenia
- 2002 Oslo, Norway (Mass start)
- 2003 Khanty-Mansiysk, Russia (first full event in Asia)
- 2004 Oberhof, Germany
- 2005 Hochfilzen, Austria and Khanty-Mansiysk, Russia (Mixed relay)
- 2006 Pokljuka, Slovenia (Mixed relay)
- 2007 Antholz-Anterselva, Italy
- 2008 Östersund, Sweden
- 2009 Pyeongchang, South Korea
- 2010 Khanty-Mansiysk, Russia (Mixed relay)
- 2011 Khanty-Mansiysk, Russia
- 2012 Ruhpolding, Germany
- 2013 Nové Město na Moravě, Czech Republic
- 2015 Kontiolahti, Finland
- 2016 Oslo, Norway
- 2017 Hochfilzen, Austria
- 2019 Östersund, Sweden
- 2020 Antholz-Anterselva, Italy
- 2021 Pokljuka, Slovenia
- 2023 Oberhof, Germany
- 2024 Nové Město na Moravě, Czech Republic
- 2025 Lenzerheide, Switzerland

Upcoming:

- 2027 Otepää, Estonia
- 2028 Hochfilzen, Austria
- 2029 Oslo, Norway
- 2031 Östersund, Sweden

== Men ==
Numbers in brackets denotes number of victories in corresponding disciplines. Boldface denotes record number of victories.

=== Individual (20 km) ===
This event was first held in 1958.

Season	Winner	Runner-up	Third
1958	Adolf Wiklund (SWE)	Olle Gunneriusson (SWE)	Viktor Butakov (USSR)
1959	Vladimir Melanin (USSR)	Dmitri Sokolov (USSR)	Sven Agge (SWE)
1961	Kalevi Huuskonen (FIN)	Aleksandr Privalov (USSR)	Paavo Repo (FIN)
1962	Vladimir Melanin (USSR)	Antti Tyrväinen (FIN)	Valentin Pshenitsyn (USSR)
1963	Vladimir Melanin (USSR) (3)	Antti Tyrväinen (FIN)	Hannu Posti (FIN)
1965	Olav Jordet (NOR)	Nikolay Puzanov (USSR)	Antti Tyrväinen (FIN)
1966	Jon Istad (NOR)	Józef Gąsienica-Sobczak (POL)	Vladimir Gundartsev (USSR)
1967	Viktor Mamatov (USSR)	Stanisław Szczepaniak (POL)	Jon Istad (NOR)
1969	Alexander Tikhonov (USSR)	Rinnat Safin (USSR)	Magnar Solberg (NOR)
1970	Alexander Tikhonov (USSR)	Tor Svendsberget (NOR)	Viktor Mamatov (USSR)
1971	Dieter Speer (GDR)	Alexander Tikhonov (USSR)	Magnar Solberg (NOR)
1973	Alexander Tikhonov (USSR) (3)	Gennady Kovalev (USSR)	Tor Svendsberget (NOR)
1974	Juhani Suutarinen (FIN)	Gheorghe Gârniță (ROU)	Tor Svendsberget (NOR)
1975	Heikki Ikola (FIN)	Nikolay Kruglov (USSR)	Esko Saira (FIN)
1977	Heikki Ikola (FIN)	Sigleif Johansen (NOR)	Alexander Tikhonov (USSR)
1978	Odd Lirhus (NOR)	Frank Ullrich (GDR)	Eberhard Rösch (GDR)
1979	Klaus Siebert (GDR)	Alexander Tikhonov (USSR)	Sigleif Johansen (NOR)
1981	Heikki Ikola (FIN) (3)	Frank Ullrich (GDR)	Erkki Antila (FIN)
1982	Frank Ullrich (GDR)	Eirik Kvalfoss (NOR)	Terje Krokstad (NOR)
1983	Frank Ullrich (GDR) (2)	Frank-Peter Roetsch (GDR)	Peter Angerer (FRG)
1985	Juri Kashkarov (USSR)	Frank-Peter Roetsch (GDR)	Tapio Piipponen (FIN)
1986	Valeriy Medvedtsev (USSR)	André Sehmisch (GDR)	Alfred Eder (AUT)
1987	Frank-Peter Roetsch (GDR)	Josh Thompson (USA)	Jan Matouš (TCH)
1989	Eirik Kvalfoss (NOR)	Gisle Fenne (NOR)	Fritz Fischer (FRG)
1990	Valeriy Medvedtsev (USSR) (2)	Sergei Tchepikov (USSR)	Anatoly Zhdanovich (USSR)
1991	Mark Kirchner (GER)	Aleksandr Popov (USSR)	Eirik Kvalfoss (NOR)
1993	Andreas Zingerle (ITA)	Sergei Tarasov (RUS)	Sergei Tchepikov (RUS)
1995	Tomasz Sikora (POL)	Jon Åge Tyldum (NOR)	Oleg Ryzhenkov (BLR)
1996	Sergei Tarasov (RUS)	Vladimir Drachev (RUS)	Vadim Sashurin (BLR)
1997	Ricco Groß (GER)	Oleg Ryzhenkov (BLR)	Ludwig Gredler (AUT)
1999	Sven Fischer (GER)	Ricco Groß (GER)	Vadim Sashurin (BLR)
2000	Wolfgang Rottmann (AUT)	Ludwig Gredler (AUT)	Frank Luck (GER)
2001	Paavo Puurunen (FIN)	Vadim Sashurin (BLR)	Ilmārs Bricis (LAT)
2003	Halvard Hanevold (NOR)	Vesa Hietalahti (FIN)	Ricco Groß (GER)
2004	Raphaël Poirée (FRA)	Tomasz Sikora (POL)	Ole Einar Bjørndalen (NOR)
2005	Roman Dostál (CZE)	Michael Greis (GER)	Ricco Groß (GER)
2007	Raphaël Poirée (FRA) (2)	Michael Greis (GER)	Michal Šlesingr (CZE)
2008	Emil Hegle Svendsen (NOR)	Ole Einar Bjørndalen (NOR)	Maxim Maksimov (RUS)
2009	Ole Einar Bjørndalen (NOR)	Christoph Stephan (GER)	Jakov Fak (CRO)
2011	Tarjei Bø (NOR)	Maxim Maksimov (RUS)	Christoph Sumann (AUT)
2012	Jakov Fak (SLO)	Simon Fourcade (FRA)	Jaroslav Soukup (CZE)
2013	Martin Fourcade (FRA)	Tim Burke (USA)	Fredrik Lindström (SWE)
2015	Martin Fourcade (FRA)	Emil Hegle Svendsen (NOR)	Ondřej Moravec (CZE)
2016	Martin Fourcade (FRA)	Dominik Landertinger (AUT)	Simon Eder (AUT)
2017	Lowell Bailey (USA)	Ondřej Moravec (CZE)	Martin Fourcade (FRA)
2019	Arnd Peiffer (GER)	Vladimir Iliev (BUL)	Tarjei Bø (NOR)
2020	Martin Fourcade (FRA) **(4)**	Johannes Thingnes Bø (NOR)	Dominik Landertinger (AUT)
2021	Sturla Holm Lægreid (NOR)	Arnd Peiffer (GER)	Johannes Dale (NOR)
2023	Johannes Thingnes Bø (NOR)	Sturla Holm Lægreid (NOR)	Sebastian Samuelsson (SWE)
2024	Johannes Thingnes Bø (NOR) (2)	Tarjei Bø (NOR)	Benedikt Doll (GER)
2025	Éric Perrot (FRA)	Tommaso Giacomel (ITA)	Quentin Fillon Maillet (FRA)

Medal table

Rank	Nation	Gold	Silver	Bronze	Total
1	Norway	11	10	11	32
2	Soviet Union	10	10	6	26
3	France	7	1	2	10
4	Finland	6	3	6	15
5	East Germany	5	5	1	11
6	Germany	4	5	4	13
7	Russia	1	3	2	6
8	Poland	1	3	0	4
9	Austria	1	2	5	8
10	United States	1	2	0	3
11	Czech Republic	1	1	3	5
11	Sweden	1	1	3	5
13	Italy	1	1	0	2
14	Slovenia	1	0	0	1
15	Belarus	0	2	3	5
16	Bulgaria	0	1	0	1
16	Romania	0	1	0	1
18	West Germany	0	0	2	2
19	Croatia	0	0	1	1
19	Czechoslovakia	0	0	1	1
19	Latvia	0	0	1	1
Totals (21 entries)		**51**	**51**	**51**	**153**

=== Sprint (10 km) ===
This event was first held in 1974.

Season	Winner	Runner-up	Third
1974	Juhani Suutarinen (FIN)	Günther Bartnick (GDR)	Torsten Wadman (SWE)
1975	Nikolay Kruglov (USSR)	Aleksandr Elizarov (USSR)	Klaus Siebert (GDR)
1976	Alexander Tikhonov (USSR)	Aleksandr Elizarov (USSR)	Nikolay Kruglov (USSR)
1977	Alexander Tikhonov (USSR) (2)	Nikolay Kruglov (USSR)	Alexander Ushakov (USSR)
1978	Frank Ullrich (GDR)	Eberhard Rösch (GDR)	Klaus Siebert (GDR)
1979	Frank Ullrich (GDR)	Odd Lirhus (NOR)	Luigi Weiss (ITA)
1981	Frank Ullrich (GDR) (3)	Erkki Antila (FIN)	Yvon Mougel (FRA)
1982	Eirik Kvalfoss (NOR)	Frank Ullrich (GDR)	Vladimir Alikin (USSR)
1983	Eirik Kvalfoss (NOR) (2)	Peter Angerer (FRG)	Alfred Eder (AUT)
1985	Frank-Peter Roetsch (GDR)	Eirik Kvalfoss (NOR)	Johann Passler (ITA)
1986	Valeriy Medvedtsev (USSR)	Franz Schuler (AUT)	André Sehmisch (GDR)
1987	Frank-Peter Roetsch (GDR) (2)	Matthias Jacob (GDR)	André Sehmisch (GDR)
1989	Frank Luck (GDR)	Eirik Kvalfoss (NOR)	Juri Kashkarov (USSR)
1990	Mark Kirchner (GDR)	Eirik Kvalfoss (NOR)	Sergei Tchepikov (USSR)
1991	Mark Kirchner (GER)	Frank Luck (GER)	Eirik Kvalfoss (NOR)
1993	Mark Kirchner (GER) (3)	Jon Åge Tyldum (NOR)	Sergei Tarasov (RUS)
1995	Patrice Bailly-Salins (FRA)	Pavel Muslimov (RUS)	Ricco Groß (GER)
1996	Vladimir Drachev (RUS)	Viktor Maigourov (RUS)	René Cattarinussi (ITA)
1997	Wilfried Pallhuber (ITA)	René Cattarinussi (ITA)	Oleg Ryzhenkov (BLR)
1999	Frank Luck (GER) (2)	Patrick Favre (ITA)	Frode Andresen (NOR)
2000	Frode Andresen (NOR)	Pavel Rostovtsev (RUS)	René Cattarinussi (ITA)
2001	Pavel Rostovtsev (RUS)	René Cattarinussi (ITA)	Halvard Hanevold (NOR)
2003	Ole Einar Bjørndalen (NOR)	Ricco Groß (GER)	Zdeněk Vítek (CZE)
2004	Raphaël Poirée (FRA)	Ricco Groß (GER)	Ole Einar Bjørndalen (NOR)
2005	Ole Einar Bjørndalen (NOR)	Sven Fischer (GER)	Ilmārs Bricis (LAT)
2007	Ole Einar Bjørndalen (NOR)	Michal Šlesingr (CZE)	Andriy Deryzemlya (UKR)
2008	Maxim Chudov (RUS)	Halvard Hanevold (NOR)	Ole Einar Bjørndalen (NOR)
2009	Ole Einar Bjørndalen (NOR) **(4)**	Lars Berger (NOR)	Halvard Hanevold (NOR)
2011	Arnd Peiffer (GER)	Martin Fourcade (FRA)	Tarjei Bø (NOR)
2012	Martin Fourcade (FRA)	Emil Hegle Svendsen (NOR)	Carl Johan Bergman (SWE)
2013	Emil Hegle Svendsen (NOR)	Martin Fourcade (FRA)	Jakov Fak (SLO)
2015	Johannes Thingnes Bø (NOR)	Nathan Smith (CAN)	Tarjei Bø (NOR)
2016	Martin Fourcade (FRA) (2)	Ole Einar Bjørndalen (NOR)	Serhiy Semenov (UKR)
2017	Benedikt Doll (GER)	Johannes Thingnes Bø (NOR)	Martin Fourcade (FRA)
2019	Johannes Thingnes Bø (NOR)	Alexander Loginov (RUS)	Quentin Fillon Maillet (FRA)
2020	Alexander Loginov (RUS)	Quentin Fillon Maillet (FRA)	Martin Fourcade (FRA)
2021	Martin Ponsiluoma (SWE)	Simon Desthieux (FRA)	Émilien Jacquelin (FRA)
2023	Johannes Thingnes Bø (NOR)	Tarjei Bø (NOR)	Sturla Holm Lægreid (NOR)
2024	Sturla Holm Lægreid (NOR)	Johannes Thingnes Bø (NOR)	Vetle Sjåstad Christiansen (NOR)
2025	Johannes Thingnes Bø (NOR) **(4)**	Campbell Wright (USA)	Quentin Fillon Maillet (FRA)

Medal table

Rank	Nation	Gold	Silver	Bronze	Total
1	Norway	13	12	10	35
2	East Germany	7	4	4	15
3	Germany	5	4	1	10
4	France	4	4	6	14
5	Russia	4	4	1	9
6	Soviet Union	4	3	5	12
7	Italy	1	3	4	8
8	Finland	1	1	0	2
9	Sweden	1	0	2	3
10	Austria	0	1	1	2
10	Czech Republic	0	1	1	2
12	Canada	0	1	0	1
12	United States	0	1	0	1
12	West Germany	0	1	0	1
15	Ukraine	0	0	2	2
16	Belarus	0	0	1	1
16	Latvia	0	0	1	1
16	Slovenia	0	0	1	1
Totals (18 entries)		**40**	**40**	**40**	**120**

=== Pursuit (12.5 km) ===
This event was first held in 1997.

Season	Winner	Runner-up	Third
1997	Viktor Maigourov (RUS)	Sergei Tarasov (RUS)	Ole Einar Bjørndalen (NOR)
1998	Vladimir Drachev (RUS)	Ole Einar Bjørndalen (NOR)	Raphaël Poirée (FRA)
1999	Ricco Groß (GER)	Frank Luck (GER)	Sven Fischer (GER)
2000	Frank Luck (GER)	Pavel Rostovtsev (RUS)	Raphaël Poirée (FRA)
2001	Pavel Rostovtsev (RUS)	Raphaël Poirée (FRA)	Sven Fischer (GER)
2003	Ricco Groß (GER)	Halvard Hanevold (NOR)	Paavo Puurunen (FIN)
2004	Ricco Groß (GER) (3)	Raphaël Poirée (FRA)	Ole Einar Bjørndalen (NOR)
2005	Ole Einar Bjørndalen (NOR)	Sergei Tchepikov (RUS)	Sven Fischer (GER)
2007	Ole Einar Bjørndalen (NOR)	Maxim Chudov (RUS)	Vincent Defrasne (FRA)
2008	Ole Einar Bjørndalen (NOR)	Maxim Chudov (RUS)	Alexander Wolf (GER)
2009	Ole Einar Bjørndalen (NOR) **(4)**	Maxim Chudov (RUS)	Alexander Os (NOR)
2011	Martin Fourcade (FRA)	Emil Hegle Svendsen (NOR)	Tarjei Bø (NOR)
2012	Martin Fourcade (FRA)	Carl Johan Bergman (SWE)	Anton Shipulin (RUS)
2013	Emil Hegle Svendsen (NOR)	Martin Fourcade (FRA)	Anton Shipulin (RUS)
2015	Erik Lesser (GER)	Anton Shipulin (RUS)	Tarjei Bø (NOR)
2016	Martin Fourcade (FRA)	Ole Einar Bjørndalen (NOR)	Emil Hegle Svendsen (NOR)
2017	Martin Fourcade (FRA) **(4)**	Johannes Thingnes Bø (NOR)	Ole Einar Bjørndalen (NOR)
2019	Dmytro Pidruchnyi (UKR)	Johannes Thingnes Bø (NOR)	Quentin Fillon Maillet (FRA)
2020	Émilien Jacquelin (FRA)	Johannes Thingnes Bø (NOR)	Alexander Loginov (RUS)
2021	Émilien Jacquelin (FRA) (2)	Sebastian Samuelsson (SWE)	Johannes Thingnes Bø (NOR)
2023	Johannes Thingnes Bø (NOR)	Sturla Holm Lægreid (NOR)	Sebastian Samuelsson (SWE)
2024	Johannes Thingnes Bø (NOR)	Sturla Holm Lægreid (NOR)	Vetle Sjåstad Christiansen (NOR)
2025	Johannes Thingnes Bø (NOR) (3)	Campbell Wright (USA)	Éric Perrot (FRA)

Medal table

Rank	Nation	Gold	Silver	Bronze	Total
1	Norway	8	9	9	26
2	France	6	3	5	14
3	Germany	5	1	4	10
4	Russia	3	7	3	13
5	Ukraine	1	0	0	1
6	Sweden	0	2	1	3
7	United States	0	1	0	1
8	Finland	0	0	1	1
Totals (8 entries)		**23**	**23**	**23**	**69**

=== Mass start (15 km) ===
This event was first held in 1999.

Season	Winner	Runner-up	Third
1999	Sven Fischer (GER)	Vladimir Drachev (RUS)	Ole Einar Bjørndalen (NOR)
2000	Raphaël Poirée (FRA)	Pavel Rostovtsev (RUS)	Ole Einar Bjørndalen (NOR)
2001	Raphaël Poirée (FRA)	Ole Einar Bjørndalen (NOR)	Sven Fischer (GER)
2002	Raphaël Poirée (FRA)	Sven Fischer (GER)	Frode Andresen (NOR)
2003	Ole Einar Bjørndalen (NOR)	Sven Fischer (GER)	Raphaël Poirée (FRA)
2004	Raphaël Poirée (FRA) **(4)**	Lars Berger (NOR)	Sergei Konovalov (RUS)
2005	Ole Einar Bjørndalen (NOR) (2)	Sven Fischer (GER)	Raphaël Poirée (FRA)
2007	Michael Greis (GER)	Andreas Birnbacher (GER)	Raphaël Poirée (FRA)
2008	Emil Hegle Svendsen (NOR)	Ole Einar Bjørndalen (NOR)	Maxim Chudov (RUS)
2009	Dominik Landertinger (AUT)	Christoph Sumann (AUT)	Ivan Tcherezov (RUS)
2011	Emil Hegle Svendsen (NOR) (2)	Lukas Hofer (ITA)	Tarjei Bø (NOR)
2012	Martin Fourcade (FRA)	Björn Ferry (SWE)	Fredrik Lindström (SWE)
2013	Tarjei Bø (NOR)	Anton Shipulin (RUS)	Emil Hegle Svendsen (NOR)
2015	Jakov Fak (SLO)	Ondřej Moravec (CZE)	Tarjei Bø (NOR)
2016	Johannes Thingnes Bø (NOR)	Martin Fourcade (FRA)	Ole Einar Bjørndalen (NOR)
2017	Simon Schempp (GER)	Johannes Thingnes Bø (NOR)	Simon Eder (AUT)
2019	Dominik Windisch (ITA)	Antonin Guigonnat (FRA)	Julian Eberhard (AUT)
2020	Johannes Thingnes Bø (NOR)	Quentin Fillon Maillet (FRA)	Émilien Jacquelin (FRA)
2021	Sturla Holm Lægreid (NOR)	Johannes Dale (NOR)	Quentin Fillon Maillet (FRA)
2023	Sebastian Samuelsson (SWE)	Martin Ponsiluoma (SWE)	Johannes Thingnes Bø (NOR)
2024	Johannes Thingnes Bø (NOR) (3)	Andrejs Rastorgujevs (LAT)	Quentin Fillon Maillet (FRA)
2025	Endre Strømsheim (NOR)	Sturla Holm Lægreid (NOR)	Johannes Thingnes Bø (NOR)

Medal table

Rank	Nation	Gold	Silver	Bronze	Total
1	Norway	10	6	9	25
2	France	5	3	6	14
3	Germany	3	4	1	8
4	Sweden	1	2	1	4
5	Austria	1	1	2	4
6	Italy	1	1	0	2
7	Slovenia	1	0	0	1
8	Russia	0	3	3	6
9	Czech Republic	0	1	0	1
9	Latvia	0	1	0	1
Totals (10 entries)		**22**	**22**	**22**	**66**

=== Relay (4 × 7.5 km) ===
This event was first held unofficially in 1965. It was a success, and replaced the team competition as an official event in 1966.

Season	Winner	Runner-up	Third
1966	Norway Jon Istad; Ragnar Tveiten; Ivar Nordkild; Olav Jordet	Poland Józef Gąsienica-Sobczak; Stanisław Szczepaniak; Stanisław Łukaszczyk; Józef Rubiś	Sweden Olle Petrusson; Tore Eriksson; Holmfrid Olsson; Sture Ohlin
1967	Norway Jon Istad (2); Ragnar Tveiten (2); Ola Wærhaug; Olav Jordet (2)	Soviet Union Alexander Tikhonov; Viktor Mamatov; Rinnat Safin; Nikolay Puzanov	Sweden Olle Petrusson; Tore Eriksson; Holmfrid Olsson; Sture Ohlin
1969	Soviet Union Alexander Tikhonov; Viktor Mamatov; Rinnat Safin; Vladimir Gundartsev	Norway Jon Istad; Ragnar Tveiten; Magnar Solberg; Esten Gjelten	Finland Kalevi Vähäkylä; Mauri Röppänen; Mauno Peltonen; Esko Marttinen
1970	Soviet Union Alexander Tikhonov; Viktor Mamatov; Rinnat Safin; Alexander Ushakov	Norway Tor Svendsberget; Ragnar Tveiten; Magnar Solberg; Esten Gjelten	East Germany Hans-Günther Jahn; Hansjörg Knauthe; Dieter Speer; Horst Koschka
1971	Soviet Union Alexander Tikhonov; Viktor Mamatov (3); Rinnat Safin; Nazim Mukhitov	Norway Tor Svendsberget; Ragnar Tveiten; Magnar Solberg; Ivar Nordkild	Poland Józef Roczak; Andrzej Rapacz; Aleksander Klima; Józef Stopka
1973	Soviet Union Alexander Tikhonov; Rinnat Safin (4); Juri Kolmakov; Gennady Kovalev	Norway Tor Svendsberget; Esten Gjelten; Ragnar Tveiten; Kjell Hovda	East Germany Dieter Speer; Manfred Geyer; Herbert Wiegand; Günther Bartnick
1974	Soviet Union Alexander Tikhonov; Alexander Ushakov; Nikolay Kruglov; Juri Kolmakov (2)	Finland Simo Halonen; Carl-Henrik Flöjt; Juhani Suutarinen; Heikki Ikola	Norway Kjell Hovda; Kåre Hovda; Terje Hanssen; Tor Svendsberget
1975	Finland Carl-Henrik Flöjt; Simo Halonen; Juhani Suutarinen; Heikki Ikola	Soviet Union Alexander Tikhonov; Aleksandr Elizarov; Alexander Ushakov; Nikolay Kruglov	Poland Jan Szpunar; Andrzej Rapacz; Ludwig Zięba; Wojciech Truchan
1977	Soviet Union Alexander Tikhonov (6); Aleksandr Elizarov; Alexander Ushakov (3); Nikolay Kruglov (2)	Finland Erkki Antila; Raimo Seppänen; Simo Halonen; Heikki Ikola	East Germany Manfred Beer; Klaus Siebert; Frank Ullrich; Manfred Geyer
1978	East Germany Manfred Beer; Frank Ullrich; Klaus Siebert; Eberhard Rösch	Norway Odd Lirhus; Sigleif Johansen; Roar Nilsen; Tor Svendsberget	West Germany Gerhard Winkler; Andreas Schweiger; Hansi Estner; Heinrich Mehringer
1979	East Germany Manfred Beer (2); Klaus Siebert (2); Frank Ullrich; Eberhard Rösch	Finland Simo Halonen; Heikki Ikola; Erkki Antila; Raimo Seppänen	Soviet Union Vladimir Alikin; Vladimir Barnashov; Nikolay Kruglov; Alexander Tikhonov
1981	East Germany Mathias Jung; Matthias Jacob; Frank Ullrich; Eberhard Rösch (3)	West Germany Peter Angerer; Peter Schweiger; Fritz Fischer; Franz Bernreiter	Soviet Union Vladimir Alikin; Anatoly Alyabyev; Vladimir Barnashov; Vladimir Gavrikov
1982	East Germany Frank Ullrich (4); Mathias Jung (2); Matthias Jacob; Bernd Helmich	Norway Eirik Kvalfoss; Kjell Søbak; Odd Lirhus; Rolf Storsveen	Soviet Union Vladimir Alikin; Anatoly Alyabyev; Vladimir Barnashov; Viktor Semyonov
1983	Soviet Union Algimantas Šalna; Juri Kashkarov; Petr Miloradov; Sergei Bulygin	East Germany Frank Ullrich; Mathias Jung; Matthias Jacob; Frank-Peter Roetsch	Norway Kjell Søbak; Eirik Kvalfoss; Odd Lirhus; Øivind Nerhagen
1985	Soviet Union Juri Kashkarov; Algimantas Šalna (2); Sergei Bulygin; Andrei Senkov	East Germany Frank-Peter Roetsch; Matthias Jacob; Ralf Göthel; André Sehmisch	West Germany Peter Angerer; Walter Pichler; Fritz Fischer; Herbert Fritzenwenger
1986	Soviet Union Juri Kashkarov (3); Dmitry Vasilyev; Valeriy Medvedtsev; Sergei Bulygin (3)	East Germany Jürgen Wirth; Frank-Peter Roetsch; Matthias Jacob; André Sehmisch	Italy Werner Kiem; Gottlieb Taschler; Johann Passler; Andreas Zingerle
1987	East Germany Frank-Peter Roetsch; Matthias Jacob (3); André Sehmisch; Jürgen Wirth	Soviet Union Dmitry Vasilyev; Juri Kashkarov; Aleksandr Popov; Valeriy Medvedtsev	West Germany Ernst Reiter; Herbert Fritzenwenger; Peter Angerer; Fritz Fischer
1989	East Germany Frank Luck; André Sehmisch (2); Birk Anders; Frank-Peter Roetsch (2)	Soviet Union Juri Kashkarov; Sergei Tchepikov; Aleksandr Popov; Sergei Bulygin	Norway Geir Einang; Sylfest Glimsdal; Gisle Fenne; Eirik Kvalfoss
1990	Italy Pieralberto Carrara; Wilfried Pallhuber; Johann Passler; Andreas Zingerle	France Christian Dumont; Xavier Blond; Hervé Flandin; Thierry Gerbier	East Germany Frank Luck; André Sehmisch; Mark Kirchner; Birk Anders
1991	Germany Ricco Groß; Frank Luck; Mark Kirchner; Fritz Fischer	Soviet Union Juri Kashkarov; Aleksandr Popov; Sergei Tarasov; Sergei Tchepikov	Norway Geir Einang; Eirik Kvalfoss; Jon Åge Tyldum; Gisle Fenne
1993	Italy Wilfried Pallhuber (2); Johann Passler (2); Pieralberto Carrara (2); Andreas Zingerle (2)	Russia Valeriy Medvedtsev; Valeri Kiriyenko; Sergei Tarasov; Sergei Tchepikov	Germany Sven Fischer; Frank Luck; Mark Kirchner; Jens Steinigen
1995	Germany Ricco Groß; Mark Kirchner (2); Frank Luck; Sven Fischer	France Lionel Laurent; Patrice Bailly-Salins; Thierry Dusserre; Hervé Flandin	Belarus Igor Khokhriakov; Aleksandr Popov; Oleg Ryzhenkov; Vadim Sashurin
1996	Russia Viktor Maigourov; Vladimir Drachev; Sergei Tarasov; Aleksey Kobelev	Germany Ricco Groß; Peter Sendel; Frank Luck; Sven Fischer	Belarus Alexei Aidarov; Oleg Ryzhenkov; Vadim Sashurin; Aleksandr Popov
1997	Germany Ricco Groß; Peter Sendel; Sven Fischer; Frank Luck	Norway Egil Gjelland; Jon Åge Tyldum; Dag Bjørndalen; Ole Einar Bjørndalen	Italy René Cattarinussi; Wilfried Pallhuber; Patrick Favre; Pieralberto Carrara
1999	Belarus Alexei Aidarov; Petr Ivashko; Vadim Sashurin; Oleg Ryzhenkov	Russia Viktor Maigourov; Vladimir Drachev; Sergei Rozhkov; Pavel Rostovtsev	Norway Halvard Hanevold; Dag Bjørndalen; Frode Andresen; Ole Einar Bjørndalen
2000	Russia Viktor Maigourov (2); Sergei Rozhkov; Vladimir Drachev (2); Pavel Rostovtsev	Norway Egil Gjelland; Frode Andresen; Halvard Hanevold; Ole Einar Bjørndalen	Germany Frank Luck; Peter Sendel; Sven Fischer; Ricco Groß
2001	France Gilles Marguet; Vincent Defrasne; Julien Robert; Raphaël Poirée	Belarus Alexei Aidarov; Alexander Syman; Oleg Ryzhenkov; Vadim Sashurin	Norway Egil Gjelland; Frode Andresen; Halvard Hanevold; Ole Einar Bjørndalen
2003	Germany Peter Sendel (2); Sven Fischer; Ricco Groß; Frank Luck	Russia Viktor Maigourov; Pavel Rostovtsev; Sergei Rozhkov; Sergei Tchepikov	Belarus Alexei Aidarov; Vladimir Drachev; Rustam Valliulin; Oleg Ryzhenkov
2004	Germany Frank Luck (6); Ricco Groß (5); Sven Fischer (4); Michael Greis	Norway Halvard Hanevold; Lars Berger; Egil Gjelland; Ole Einar Bjørndalen	France Ferreol Cannard; Vincent Defrasne; Julien Robert; Raphaël Poirée
2005	Norway Halvard Hanevold; Stian Eckhoff; Egil Gjelland; Ole Einar Bjørndalen	Russia Sergei Rozhkov; Nikolay Kruglov Jr. Pavel Rostovtsev; Sergei Tchepikov	Austria Daniel Mesotitsch; Friedrich Pinter; Wolfgang Rottmann; Christoph Sumann
2007	Russia Ivan Tcherezov; Maxim Chudov; Dmitri Yaroshenko; Nikolay Kruglov Jr.	Norway Halvard Hanevold; Lars Berger; Frode Andresen; Ole Einar Bjørndalen	Germany Ricco Groß; Michael Rösch; Sven Fischer; Michael Greis
2008	Russia Ivan Tcherezov (2); Nikolay Kruglov Jr. (2); Dmitri Yaroshenko (2); Maxim Chudov (2)	Norway Emil Hegle Svendsen; Rune Brattsveen; Halvard Hanevold; Ole Einar Bjørndalen	Germany Michael Rösch; Alexander Wolf; Andreas Birnbacher; Michael Greis
2009	Norway Emil Hegle Svendsen; Lars Berger; Halvard Hanevold (2); Ole Einar Bjørndalen	Austria Daniel Mesotitsch; Simon Eder; Dominik Landertinger; Christoph Sumann	Germany Michael Rösch; Christoph Stephan; Arnd Peiffer; Michael Greis
2011	Norway Ole Einar Bjørndalen; Alexander Os; Emil Hegle Svendsen; Tarjei Bø	Ukraine Olexander Bilanenko; Andriy Deryzemlya; Serhiy Semenov; Serhiy Sednev	Sweden Fredrik Lindström; Magnus Jonsson; Carl Johan Bergman; Björn Ferry
2012	Norway Ole Einar Bjørndalen; Rune Brattsveen; Tarjei Bø; Emil Hegle Svendsen	France Jean-Guillaume Béatrix; Simon Fourcade; Alexis Bœuf; Martin Fourcade	Germany Simon Schempp; Andreas Birnbacher; Michael Greis; Arnd Peiffer
2013	Norway Ole Einar Bjørndalen; Henrik L'Abée-Lund; Tarjei Bø; Emil Hegle Svendsen	France Simon Fourcade; Jean-Guillaume Béatrix; Alexis Bœuf; Martin Fourcade	Germany Simon Schempp; Andreas Birnbacher; Arnd Peiffer; Erik Lesser
2015	Germany Erik Lesser; Daniel Böhm; Arnd Peiffer; Simon Schempp	Norway Ole Einar Bjørndalen; Tarjei Bø; Johannes Thingnes Bø; Emil Hegle Svendsen	France Simon Fourcade; Jean-Guillaume Béatrix; Quentin Fillon Maillet; Martin Fourcade
2016	Norway Ole Einar Bjørndalen (6); Tarjei Bø; Johannes Thingnes Bø; Emil Hegle Svendsen (5)	Germany Erik Lesser; Benedikt Doll; Arnd Peiffer; Simon Schempp	Canada Christian Gow; Nathan Smith; Scott Gow; Brendan Green
2017	Russia Alexey Volkov; Maxim Tsvetkov; Anton Babikov; Anton Shipulin	France Jean-Guillaume Béatrix; Quentin Fillon Maillet; Simon Desthieux; Martin Fourcade	Austria Daniel Mesotitsch; Julian Eberhard; Simon Eder; Dominik Landertinger
2019	Norway Lars Helge Birkeland; Vetle Sjåstad Christiansen; Tarjei Bø; Johannes Thingnes Bø	Germany Erik Lesser; Roman Rees; Arnd Peiffer; Benedikt Doll	Russia Matvey Eliseev; Nikita Porshnev; Dmitry Malyshko; Alexander Loginov
2020	France Émilien Jacquelin; Martin Fourcade; Simon Desthieux; Quentin Fillon Maillet	Norway Vetle Sjåstad Christiansen; Johannes Dale; Tarjei Bø; Johannes Thingnes Bø	Germany Erik Lesser; Philipp Horn; Arnd Peiffer; Benedikt Doll
2021	Norway Sturla Holm Lægreid; Tarjei Bø; Johannes Thingnes Bø; Vetle Sjåstad Christiansen (2)	Sweden Peppe Femling; Jesper Nelin; Martin Ponsiluoma; Sebastian Samuelsson	Russian Biathlon Union Said Karimulla Khalili; Matvey Eliseev; Alexander Loginov; Eduard Latypov
2023	France Antonin Guigonnat; Fabien Claude; Émilien Jacquelin (2); Quentin Fillon Maillet (2)	Norway Vetle Sjåstad Christiansen; Tarjei Bø; Sturla Holm Lægreid; Johannes Thingnes Bø	Sweden Peppe Femling; Martin Ponsiluoma; Jesper Nelin; Sebastian Samuelsson
2024	Sweden Viktor Brandt; Jesper Nelin; Martin Ponsiluoma; Sebastian Samuelsson	Norway Sturla Holm Lægreid; Tarjei Bø; Johannes Thingnes Bø; Vetle Sjåstad Christiansen	France Éric Perrot; Fabien Claude; Émilien Jacquelin; Quentin Fillon Maillet
2025	Norway Endre Strømsheim; Tarjei Bø **(7)**; Sturla Holm Lægreid (2); Johannes Thingnes Bø (4)	France Émilien Claude; Fabien Claude; Éric Perrot; Quentin Fillon Maillet	Germany Philipp Nawrath; Danilo Riethmüller; Johannes Kühn; Philipp Horn

Medal table

Rank	Nation	Gold	Silver	Bronze	Total
1	Norway	11	15	6	32
2	Soviet Union	9	5	3	17
3	Germany	6	3	9	18
4	East Germany	6	3	4	13
5	Russia	5	4	1	10
6	France	3	6	3	12
7	Italy	2	0	2	4
8	Finland	1	3	1	5
9	Sweden	1	1	4	6
10	Belarus	1	1	3	5
11	West Germany	0	1	3	4
12	Austria	0	1	2	3
12	Poland	0	1	2	3
14	Ukraine	0	1	0	1
15	Canada	0	0	1	1
15	Russian Biathlon Union	0	0	1	1
Totals (16 entries)		**45**	**45**	**45**	**135**

=== Team (time) ===
This event was held from 1958 to 1965. The times of the top 3 athletes from each country in the 20 km individual were added together (in 1958 the top 4).

Season	Winner	Runner-up	Third
1958	Sweden Adolf Wiklund; Olle Gunneriusson; Sture Ohlin; Sven Nilsson	Soviet Union Viktor Butakov; Valentin Pshenitsyn; Dmitri Sokolov; Alexander Gubin	Norway Arvid Nyberg; Asbjørn Bakken; Knut Wold; Rolf Gråtrud
1959	Soviet Union Vladimir Melanin; Dmitri Sokolov; Valentin Pshenitsyn	Sweden Sven Agge; Adolf Wiklund; Sture Ohlin	Norway Knut Wold; Henry Hermansen; Ivar Skogsrud
1961	Finland Kalevi Huuskonen; Paavo Repo; Antti Tyrväinen	Soviet Union Aleksandr Privalov; Valentin Pshenitsyn; Dmitri Sokolov	Sweden Klas Lestander; Tage Lundin; Stig Andersson
1962	Soviet Union Vladimir Melanin; Valentin Pshenitsyn; Nikolay Puzanov	Finland Antti Tyrväinen; Hannu Posti; Kalevi Huuskonen	Norway Jon Istad; Olav Jordet; Henry Hermansen
1963	Soviet Union Vladimir Melanin **(3)**; Nikolay Meshcheryakov; Valentin Pshenitsyn **(3)**	Finland Antti Tyrväinen; Hannu Posti; Veikko Hakulinen	Norway Jon Istad; Olav Jordet; Egil Nygård
1965	Norway Olav Jordet; Ola Wærhaug; Ivar Nordkild	Soviet Union Nikolay Puzanov; Vladimir Melanin; Vassiliy Makarov	Poland Stanisław Szczepaniak; Józef Rubiś; Józef Gąsienica-Sobczak

Medal table

Rank	Nation	Gold	Silver	Bronze	Total
1	Soviet Union	3	3	0	6
2	Finland	1	2	0	3
3	Sweden	1	1	1	3
4	Norway	1	0	4	5
5	Poland	0	0	1	1
Totals (5 entries)		**6**	**6**	**6**	**18**

=== Team ===
This event, a patrol race, was held from 1989 to 1998. From 1989 to 1993 the distance of this event was 20 km, while from 1994 to 1998, the distance was 10 km.

Season	Winner	Runner-up	Third
1989	Soviet Union Juri Kashkarov; Sergei Bulygin; Aleksandr Popov; Sergei Tchepikov	West Germany Franz Wudy; Herbert Fritzenwenger; Georg Fischer; Fritz Fischer	East Germany Andreas Heymann; André Sehmisch; Raik Dittrich; Steffen Hoos
1990	East Germany Raik Dittrich; Mark Kirchner; Birk Anders; Frank Luck	Czechoslovakia Tomáš Kos; Ivan Masařík; Jiří Holubec; Jan Matouš	France Christian Dumont; Stéphane Bouthiaux; Hervé Flandin; Thierry Gerbier
1991	Italy Hubert Leitgeb; Gottlieb Taschler; Simon Demetz; Wilfried Pallhuber	Norway Sverre Istad; Jon Åge Tyldum; Ivar Michal Ulekleiv; Frode Løberg	Soviet Union Anatoly Zhdanovich; Sergei Tarasov; Sergei Tchepikov; Valeriy Medvedtsev
1992	CIS Evgeny Redkin; Alexander Tropnikov; Anatoly Zhdanovich; Aleksandr Popov	Norway Frode Løberg; Jon Åge Tyldum; Sylfest Glimsdal; Gisle Fenne	Estonia Aivo Udras; Hillar Zahkna; Urmas Kaldvee; Kalju Ojaste
1993	Germany Fritz Fischer; Frank Luck (2); Steffen Hoos; Sven Fischer	Russia Aleksey Kobelev; Valeri Kiriyenko; Sergei Loschkin; Sergei Tchepikov	France Gilles Marguet; Thierry Dusserre; Xavier Blond; Lionel Laurent
1994	Italy Pieralberto Carrara; Hubert Leitgeb (2); Andreas Zingerle; Wilfried Pallhuber (2)	Russia Vladimir Drachev; Aleksey Kobelev; Valeri Kiriyenko; Sergei Tarasov	Germany Jens Steinigen; Marco Morgenstern; Peter Sendel; Steffen Hoos
1995	Norway Frode Andresen; Dag Bjørndalen; Halvard Hanevold; Jon Åge Tyldum	Czech Republic Petr Garabík; Roman Dostál; Jiří Holubec; Ivan Masařík	France Thierry Dusserre; Franck Perrot; Lionel Laurent; Stéphane Bouthiaux
1996	Belarus Petr Ivashko; Oleg Ryzhenkov; Aleksandr Popov; Vadim Sashurin	Russia Vladimir Drachev; Pavel Mouslimov; Viktor Maigourov; Sergei Rozhkov	Italy René Cattarinussi; Hubert Leitgeb; Pieralberto Carrara; Patrick Favre
1997	Belarus Oleg Ryzhenkov (2); Petr Ivashko (2); Aleksandr Popov **(4)**; Vadim Sashurin (2)	Germany Carsten Heymann; Mark Kirchner; Frank Luck; Peter Sendel	Poland Wiesław Ziemianin; Jan Ziemianin; Wojciech Kozub; Tomasz Sikora
1998	Norway Egil Gjelland; Halvard Hanevold (2); Sylfest Glimsdal; Ole Einar Bjørndalen	Germany Ricco Groß; Carsten Heymann; Sven Fischer; Frank Luck	Russia Vladimir Drachev; Aleksey Kobelev; Sergei Rozhkov; Viktor Maigourov

Medal table

Rank	Nation	Gold	Silver	Bronze	Total
1	Norway	2	2	0	4
2	Italy	2	0	1	3
3	Belarus	2	0	0	2
4	Germany	1	2	1	4
5	East Germany	1	0	1	2
5	Soviet Union	1	0	1	2
7	CIS	1	0	0	1
8	Russia	0	3	1	4
9	Czech Republic	0	1	0	1
9	Czechoslovakia	0	1	0	1
9	West Germany	0	1	0	1
12	France	0	0	3	3
13	Estonia	0	0	1	1
13	Poland	0	0	1	1
Totals (14 entries)		**10**	**10**	**10**	**30**

== Women ==
Numbers in brackets denotes number of victories in corresponding disciplines. Boldface denotes record number of victories.

=== Individual (15 km) ===
This event was first held in 1984. Through 1988 the distance was 10 km.

Season	Winner	Runner-up	Third
1984	Venera Chernyshova (USSR)	Liudmila Zabolotnaya (USSR)	Tatiana Brylina (USSR)
1985	Kaija Parve (USSR)	Sanna Grønlid (NOR)	Eva Korpela (SWE)
1986	Eva Korpela (SWE)	Siv Bråten (NOR)	Sanna Grønlid (NOR)
1987	Sanna Grønlid (NOR)	Kaija Parve (USSR)	Tuija Vuoksiala (FIN)
1988	Anne Elvebakk (NOR)	Elin Kristiansen (NOR)	Venera Chernyshova (USSR)
1989	Petra Schaaf (FRG)	Anne Elvebakk (NOR)	Svetlana Davidova (USSR)
1990	Svetlana Davidova (USSR)	Elena Golovina (USSR)	Petra Schaaf (FRG)
1991	Petra Schaaf (GER)	Grete Ingeborg Nykkelmo (NOR)	Iva Schkodreva (BUL)
1993	Petra Schaaf (GER) **(3)**	Myriam Bédard (CAN)	Svetlana Paramygina (BLR)
1995	Corinne Niogret (FRA)	Uschi Disl (GER)	Ekaterina Dafovska (BUL)
1996	Emmanuelle Claret (FRA)	Olga Melnik (RUS)	Olena Petrova (UKR)
1997	Magdalena Forsberg (SWE)	Olena Zubrilova (UKR)	Ekaterina Dafovska (BUL)
1999	Olena Zubrilova (UKR)	Corinne Niogret (FRA)	Albina Akhatova (RUS)
2000	Corinne Niogret (FRA) (2)	Yu Shumei (CHN)	Magdalena Forsberg (SWE)
2001	Magdalena Forsberg (SWE) (2)	Liv Grete Poirée (NOR)	Olena Zubrilova (UKR)
2003	Kateřina Holubcová (CZE)	Olena Zubrilova (BLR)	Gunn Margit Andreassen (NOR)
2004	Olga Pyleva (RUS)	Albina Akhatova (RUS)	Olena Petrova (UKR)
2005	Andrea Henkel (GER)	Sun Ribo (CHN)	Linda Tjørhom (NOR)
2007	Linda Grubben (NOR)	Florence Baverel-Robert (FRA)	Martina Glagow (GER)
2008	Ekaterina Iourieva (RUS)	Martina Glagow (GER)	Oksana Khvostenko (UKR)
2009	Kati Wilhelm (GER)	Teja Gregorin (SLO)	Tora Berger (NOR)
2011	Helena Ekholm (SWE)	Tina Bachmann (GER)	Vita Semerenko (UKR)
2012	Tora Berger (NOR)	Marie-Laure Brunet (FRA)	Helena Ekholm (SWE)
2013	Tora Berger (NOR) (2)	Andrea Henkel (GER)	Valentyna Semerenko (UKR)
2015	Ekaterina Yurlova (RUS)	Gabriela Soukalová (CZE)	Kaisa Mäkäräinen (FIN)
2016	Marie Dorin Habert (FRA)	Anaïs Bescond (FRA)	Laura Dahlmeier (GER)
2017	Laura Dahlmeier (GER)	Gabriela Koukalová (CZE)	Alexia Runggaldier (ITA)
2019	Hanna Öberg (SWE)	Lisa Vittozzi (ITA)	Justine Braisaz (FRA)
2020	Dorothea Wierer (ITA)	Vanessa Hinz (GER)	Marte Olsbu Røiseland (NOR)
2021	Markéta Davidová (CZE)	Hanna Öberg (SWE)	Ingrid Landmark Tandrevold (NOR)
2023	Hanna Öberg (SWE) (2)	Linn Persson (SWE)	Lisa Vittozzi (ITA)
2024	Lisa Vittozzi (ITA)	Janina Hettich-Walz (GER)	Julia Simon (FRA)
2025	Julia Simon (FRA)	Ella Halvarsson (SWE)	Lou Jeanmonnot (FRA)

Medal table

Rank	Nation	Gold	Silver	Bronze	Total
1	Sweden	6	3	3	12
2	Norway	5	6	6	17
3	Germany	5	6	2	13
4	France	5	4	3	12
5	Soviet Union	3	3	3	9
6	Russia	3	2	1	6
7	Czech Republic	2	2	0	4
8	Italy	2	1	2	5
9	Ukraine	1	1	6	8
10	West Germany	1	0	1	2
11	China	0	2	0	2
12	Belarus	0	1	1	2
13	Canada	0	1	0	1
13	Slovenia	0	1	0	1
15	Bulgaria	0	0	3	3
16	Finland	0	0	2	2
Totals (16 entries)		**33**	**33**	**33**	**99**

=== Sprint (7.5 km) ===
This event was first held in 1984. Through 1988 the distance was 5 km.

Season	Winner	Runner-up	Third
1984	Venera Chernyshova (USSR)	Sanna Grønlid (NOR)	Andrea Grossegger (AUT)
1985	Sanna Grønlid (NOR)	Kaija Parve (USSR)	Venera Chernyshova (USSR)
1986	Kaija Parve (USSR)	Nadiya Billova (USSR)	Eva Korpela (SWE)
1987	Elena Golovina (USSR)	Venera Chernyshova (USSR)	Anne Elvebakk (NOR)
1988	Petra Schaaf (FRG)	Eva Korpela (SWE)	Anne Elvebakk (NOR)
1989	Anne Elvebakk (NOR)	Zvetana Krasteva (BUL)	Natalia Prikazchikova (USSR)
1990	Anne Elvebakk (NOR) (2)	Svetlana Davidova (USSR)	Elin Kristiansen (NOR)
1991	Grete Ingeborg Nykkelmo (NOR)	Svetlana Davidova (USSR)	Elena Golovina (USSR)
1993	Myriam Bédard (CAN)	Nadezhda Talanova (RUS)	Elena Belova (RUS)
1995	Anne Briand (FRA)	Uschi Disl (GER)	Corinne Niogret (FRA)
1996	Olga Romasko (RUS)	Ann-Elen Skjelbreid (NOR)	Magdalena Wallin (SWE)
1997	Olga Romasko (RUS) (2)	Olena Zubrilova (UKR)	Magdalena Forsberg (SWE)
1999	Martina Zellner (GER)	Magdalena Forsberg (SWE)	Olena Zubrilova (UKR)
2000	Liv Grete Skjelbreid (NOR)	Katrin Apel (GER)	Martina Zellner (GER)
2001	Kati Wilhelm (GER)	Uschi Disl (GER)	Liv Grete Poirée (NOR)
2003	Sylvie Becaert (FRA)	Olena Petrova (UKR)	Kateřina Holubcová (CZE)
2004	Liv Grete Poirée (NOR) (2)	Anna Bogaliy (RUS)	Martina Glagow (GER)
2004	Liv Grete Poirée (NOR) (2)	Anna Bogaliy (RUS)	Ekaterina Ivanova (BLR)
2005	Uschi Disl (GER)	Olga Zaitseva (RUS)	Olena Zubrilova (BLR)
2007	Magdalena Neuner (GER)	Anna Carin Olofsson (SWE)	Natalia Guseva (RUS)
2008	Andrea Henkel (GER)	Albina Akhatova (RUS)	Oksana Khvostenko (UKR)
2009	Kati Wilhelm (GER) (2)	Simone Hauswald (GER)	Olga Zaitseva (RUS)
2011	Magdalena Neuner (GER)	Kaisa Mäkäräinen (FIN)	Anastasiya Kuzmina (SVK)
2012	Magdalena Neuner (GER) **(3)**	Darya Domracheva (BLR)	Vita Semerenko (UKR)
2013	Olena Pidhrushna (UKR)	Tora Berger (NOR)	Vita Semerenko (UKR)
2015	Marie Dorin Habert (FRA)	Weronika Nowakowska-Ziemniak (POL)	Valentyna Semerenko (UKR)
2016	Tiril Eckhoff (NOR)	Marie Dorin Habert (FRA)	Laura Dahlmeier (GER)
2017	Gabriela Koukalová (CZE)	Laura Dahlmeier (GER)	Anaïs Chevalier (FRA)
2019	Anastasiya Kuzmina (SVK)	Ingrid Landmark Tandrevold (NOR)	Laura Dahlmeier (GER)
2020	Marte Olsbu Røiseland (NOR)	Susan Dunklee (USA)	Lucie Charvátová (CZE)
2021	Tiril Eckhoff (NOR) (2)	Anaïs Chevalier-Bouchet (FRA)	Hanna Sola (BLR)
2023	Denise Herrmann-Wick (GER)	Hanna Öberg (SWE)	Linn Persson (SWE)
2024	Julia Simon (FRA)	Justine Braisaz-Bouchet (FRA)	Lou Jeanmonnot (FRA)
2025	Justine Braisaz-Bouchet (FRA)	Franziska Preuß (GER)	Suvi Minkkinen (FIN)

Medal table

Rank	Nation	Gold	Silver	Bronze	Total
1	Germany	9	6	4	19
2	Norway	9	4	4	17
3	France	5	3	3	11
4	Soviet Union	3	5	3	11
5	Russia	2	4	3	9
6	Ukraine	1	2	5	8
7	Czech Republic	1	0	2	3
8	Slovakia	1	0	1	2
9	Canada	1	0	0	1
9	West Germany	1	0	0	1
11	Sweden	0	4	4	8
12	Belarus	0	1	3	4
13	Finland	0	1	1	2
14	Bulgaria	0	1	0	1
14	Poland	0	1	0	1
14	United States	0	1	0	1
17	Austria	0	0	1	1
Totals (17 entries)		**33**	**33**	**34**	**100**

=== Pursuit (10 km) ===
This event was first held in 1997.

Season	Winner	Runner-up	Third
1997	Magdalena Forsberg (SWE)	Olena Zubrilova (UKR)	Olga Romasko (RUS)
1998	Magdalena Forsberg (SWE)	Corinne Niogret (FRA)	Martina Zellner (GER)
1999	Olena Zubrilova (UKR)	Martina Schwarzbacherová (SVK)	Martina Zellner (GER)
2000	Magdalena Forsberg (SWE) **(3)**	Uschi Disl (GER)	Florence Baverel-Robert (FRA)
2001	Liv Grete Poirée (NOR)	Corinne Niogret (FRA)	Magdalena Forsberg (SWE)
2003	Sandrine Bailly (FRA)	None awarded	Svetlana Ishmouratova (RUS)
2003	Martina Glagow (GER)	None awarded	Svetlana Ishmouratova (RUS)
2004	Liv Grete Poirée (NOR) (2)	Martina Glagow (GER)	Anna Bogaliy (RUS)
2005	Uschi Disl (GER)	Liu Xianying (CHN)	Olga Zaitseva (RUS)
2007	Magdalena Neuner (GER)	Linda Grubben (NOR)	Anna Carin Olofsson (SWE)
2008	Andrea Henkel (GER)	Ekaterina Iourieva (RUS)	Albina Akhatova (RUS)
2009	Helena Jonsson (SWE)	Kati Wilhelm (GER)	Olga Zaitseva (RUS)
2011	Kaisa Mäkäräinen (FIN)	Magdalena Neuner (GER)	Helena Ekholm (SWE)
2012	Darya Domracheva (BLR)	Magdalena Neuner (GER)	Olga Vilukhina (RUS)
2013	Tora Berger (NOR)	Krystyna Pałka (POL)	Olena Pidhrushna (UKR)
2015	Marie Dorin Habert (FRA)	Laura Dahlmeier (GER)	Weronika Nowakowska-Ziemniak (POL)
2016	Laura Dahlmeier (GER)	Dorothea Wierer (ITA)	Marie Dorin Habert (FRA)
2017	Laura Dahlmeier (GER) (2)	Darya Domracheva (BLR)	Gabriela Koukalová (CZE)
2019	Denise Herrmann (GER)	Tiril Eckhoff (NOR)	Laura Dahlmeier (GER)
2020	Dorothea Wierer (ITA)	Denise Herrmann (GER)	Marte Olsbu Røiseland (NOR)
2021	Tiril Eckhoff (NOR)	Lisa Theresa Hauser (AUT)	Anaïs Chevalier-Bouchet (FRA)
2023	Julia Simon (FRA)	Denise Herrmann-Wick (GER)	Marte Olsbu Røiseland (NOR)
2024	Julia Simon (FRA) (2)	Lisa Vittozzi (ITA)	Justine Braisaz-Bouchet (FRA)
2025	Franziska Preuß (GER)	Elvira Öberg (SWE)	Justine Braisaz-Bouchet (FRA)

Medal table

Rank	Nation	Gold	Silver	Bronze	Total
1	Germany	8	8	3	19
2	France	4	2	5	11
3	Norway	4	2	2	8
4	Sweden	4	1	3	8
5	Italy	1	2	0	3
6	Ukraine	1	1	1	3
7	Belarus	1	1	0	2
8	Finland	1	0	0	1
9	Russia	0	1	7	8
10	Poland	0	1	1	2
11	Austria	0	1	0	1
11	China	0	1	0	1
11	Slovakia	0	1	0	1
14	Czech Republic	0	0	1	1
Totals (14 entries)		**24**	**22**	**23**	**69**

=== Mass start (12.5 km) ===
This event was first held in 1999.

Season	Winner	Runner-up	Third
1999	Olena Zubrilova (UKR)	Olena Petrova (UKR)	Magdalena Forsberg (SWE)
2000	Liv Grete Skjelbreid (NOR)	Galina Kukleva (RUS)	Corinne Niogret (FRA)
2001	Magdalena Forsberg (SWE)	Martina Glagow (GER)	Liv Grete Poirée (NOR)
2002	Olena Zubrilova (UKR) **(2)**	Olga Pyleva (RUS)	Olga Nazarova (BLR)
2003	Albina Akhatova (RUS)	Svetlana Ishmouratova (RUS)	Sandrine Bailly (FRA)
2004	Liv Grete Poirée (NOR) **(2)**	Katrin Apel (GER)	Sandrine Bailly (FRA)
2005	Gro Marit Istad Kristiansen (NOR)	Anna Carin Olofsson (SWE)	Olga Pyleva (RUS)
2007	Andrea Henkel (GER)	Martina Glagow (GER)	Kati Wilhelm (GER)
2008	Magdalena Neuner (GER)	Tora Berger (NOR)	Ekaterina Iourieva (RUS)
2009	Olga Zaitseva (RUS)	Anastasiya Kuzmina (SVK)	Helena Jonsson (SWE)
2011	Magdalena Neuner (GER) **(2)**	Darya Domracheva (BLR)	Tora Berger (NOR)
2012	Tora Berger (NOR)	Marie-Laure Brunet (FRA)	Kaisa Mäkäräinen (FIN)
2013	Darya Domracheva (BLR)	Tora Berger (NOR)	Monika Hojnisz (POL)
2015	Valentyna Semerenko (UKR)	Franziska Preuß (GER)	Karin Oberhofer (ITA)
2016	Marie Dorin Habert (FRA)	Laura Dahlmeier (GER)	Kaisa Mäkäräinen (FIN)
2017	Laura Dahlmeier (GER)	Susan Dunklee (USA)	Kaisa Mäkäräinen (FIN)
2019	Dorothea Wierer (ITA)	Ekaterina Yurlova-Percht (RUS)	Denise Herrmann (GER)
2020	Marte Olsbu Røiseland (NOR)	Dorothea Wierer (ITA)	Hanna Öberg (SWE)
2021	Lisa Theresa Hauser (AUT)	Ingrid Landmark Tandrevold (NOR)	Tiril Eckhoff (NOR)
2023	Hanna Öberg (SWE)	Ingrid Landmark Tandrevold (NOR)	Julia Simon (FRA)
2024	Justine Braisaz-Bouchet (FRA)	Lisa Vittozzi (ITA)	Lou Jeanmonnot (FRA)
2025	Elvira Öberg (SWE)	Océane Michelon (FRA)	Maren Kirkeeide (NOR)

Medal table

Rank	Nation	Gold	Silver	Bronze	Total
1	Norway	5	4	4	13
2	Germany	4	5	2	11
3	Sweden	3	1	3	7
4	Ukraine	3	1	0	4
5	Russia	2	4	2	8
6	France	2	2	5	9
7	Italy	1	2	1	4
8	Belarus	1	1	1	3
9	Austria	1	0	0	1
10	Slovakia	0	1	0	1
10	United States	0	1	0	1
12	Finland	0	0	3	3
13	Poland	0	0	1	1
Totals (13 entries)		**22**	**22**	**22**	**66**

=== Relay (4 × 6 km) ===
This event was first held in 1984. Through 1988, the event was 3 × 5 km, while from 1989 to 1991 it was 3 × 7.5 km, and from 1993 to 2001 it was 4 × 7.5 km. In 2003, the leg distance was set to 6 km.

Season	Winner	Runner-up	Third
1984	Soviet Union Venera Chernyshova; Liudmila Zabolotnaya; Kaija Parve	Norway Sanna Grønlid; Gry Østvik; Siv Bråten	United States Holly Beatie; Julie Newman; Kari Swenson
1985	Soviet Union Venera Chernyshova; Elena Golovina; Kaija Parve	Norway Sanna Grønlid; Gry Østvik; Siv Bråten	Finland Pirjo Mattila; Tuija Vuoksiala; Teija Nieminen
1986	Soviet Union Kaija Parve; Nadiya Billova; Venera Chernyshova	Sweden Eva Korpela; Inger Björkbom; Sabine Karlsson	Norway Sanna Grønlid; Siv Bråten; Anne Elvebakk
1987	Soviet Union Elena Golovina; Venera Chernyshova; Kaija Parve	Sweden Inger Björkbom; Mia Stadig; Eva Korpela	Norway Anne Elvebakk; Sanna Grønlid; Siv Bråten Lunde
1988	Soviet Union Venera Chernyshova (5); Elena Golovina; Kaija Parve (5)	Norway Elin Kristiansen; Anne Elvebakk; Mona Bollerud	Sweden Eva Korpela; Inger Björkbom; Sabine Karlsson
1989	Soviet Union Natalia Prikazchikova; Svetlana Davidova; Elena Golovina	Bulgaria Zvetana Krasteva; Maria Manolova; Nadezhda Aleksieva	Czechoslovakia Eva Burešová; Renata Novotná; Jiřína Adamičková
1990	Soviet Union Elena Batsevich; Elena Golovina; Svetlana Davidova	Norway Grete Ingeborg Nykkelmo; Anne Elvebakk; Elin Kristiansen	Finland Tuija Vuoksiala; Seija Hyytiäinen; Pirjo Mattila
1991	Soviet Union Elena Belova; Elena Golovina **(6)**; Svetlana Davidova (3)	Norway Grete Ingeborg Nykkelmo; Anne Elvebakk; Elin Kristiansen	Germany Uschi Disl; Kerstin Moring; Antje Misersky
1993	Czech Republic Jana Kulhavá; Jiřína Adamičková; Iveta Knížková; Eva Háková	France Corinne Niogret; Véronique Claudel; Delphyne Heymann; Anne Briand	Russia Svetlana Paniutina; Nadezhda Talanova; Olga Simushina; Elena Belova
1995	Germany Uschi Disl; Antje Harvey; Simone Greiner-Petter-Memm; Petra Schaaf	France Corinne Niogret; Véronique Claudel; Florence Baverel; Anne Briand	Norway Ann-Elen Skjelbreid; Hildegunn Fossen; Annette Sikveland; Gunn Margit Andreassen
1996	Germany Uschi Disl; Simone Greiner-Petter-Memm; Katrin Apel; Petra Behle	France Corinne Niogret; Florence Baverel; Emmanuelle Claret; Anne Briand	Ukraine Tetyana Vodopyanova; Valentina Tserbe-Nessina; Olena Petrova; Olena Zubrilova
1997	Germany Uschi Disl; Simone Greiner-Petter-Memm; Katrin Apel; Petra Behle (3)	Norway Ann-Elen Skjelbreid; Annette Sikveland; Liv Grete Skjelbreid; Gunn Margit Andreassen	Russia Olga Melnik; Galina Kukleva; Nadezhda Talanova; Olga Romasko
1999	Germany Uschi Disl (4); Simone Greiner-Petter-Memm (4); Katrin Apel (3); Martina Zellner	Russia Nadezhda Talanova; Galina Kukleva; Olga Romasko; Albina Akhatova	France Delphyne Heymann-Burlet; Florence Baverel; Christelle Gros; Corinne Niogret
2000	Russia Olga Pyleva; Svetlana Tchernousova; Galina Kukleva; Albina Akhatova	Germany Uschi Disl; Katrin Apel; Andrea Henkel; Martina Zellner	Ukraine Olena Zubrilova; Olena Petrova; Nina Lemesh; Tetyana Vodopyanova
2001	Russia Olga Pyleva; Anna Bogaliy; Galina Kukleva; Svetlana Ishmouratova	Germany Uschi Disl; Katrin Apel; Andrea Henkel; Kati Wilhelm	Ukraine Olena Zubrilova; Olena Petrova; Nina Lemesh; Tetyana Vodopyanova
2003	Russia Albina Akhatova (2); Svetlana Ishmouratova; Galina Kukleva (3); Svetlana Tchernousova (2)	Ukraine Oksana Khvostenko; Iryna Merkushina; Oksana Yakovleva; Olena Petrova	Germany Simone Denkinger; Uschi Disl; Kati Wilhelm; Martina Glagow
2004	Norway Linda Tjørhom; Gro Marit Istad Kristiansen; Gunn Margit Andreassen; Liv Grete Poirée	Russia Olga Pyleva; Svetlana Ishmouratova; Anna Bogaliy; Albina Akhatova	Germany Martina Glagow; Katrin Apel; Simone Denkinger; Kati Wilhelm
2005	Russia Olga Pyleva; Svetlana Ishmouratova (3); Anna Bogaliy-Titovets (2); Olga Zaitseva	Germany Uschi Disl; Katrin Apel; Andrea Henkel; Kati Wilhelm	Belarus Ekaterina Ivanova; Olga Nazarova; Liudmilla Ananko; Olena Zubrilova
2007	Germany Martina Glagow; Andrea Henkel; Magdalena Neuner; Kati Wilhelm	France Florence Baverel-Robert; Delphyne Peretto; Sylvie Becaert; Sandrine Bailly	Norway Tora Berger; Ann Kristin Aafedt Flatland; Jori Mørkve; Linda Grubben
2008	Germany Martina Glagow (2); Andrea Henkel; Magdalena Neuner; Kati Wilhelm (2)	Ukraine Oksana Yakovleva; Vita Semerenko; Valentyna Semerenko; Oksana Khvostenko	France Delphine Peretto; Marie-Laure Brunet; Sylvie Becaert; Sandrine Bailly
2009	Russia Svetlana Sleptsova; Anna Boulygina; Olga Medvedtseva (4); Olga Zaitseva (2)	Germany Martina Beck; Magdalena Neuner; Andrea Henkel; Kati Wilhelm	France Marie-Laure Brunet; Sylvie Becaert; Marie Dorin; Sandrine Bailly
2011	Germany Andrea Henkel; Miriam Gössner; Tina Bachmann; Magdalena Neuner	France Anaïs Bescond; Marie-Laure Brunet; Sophie Boilley; Marie Dorin	Belarus Nadezhda Skardino; Darya Domracheva; Nadzeya Pisareva; Liudmila Kalinchik
2012	Germany Tina Bachmann (2); Magdalena Neuner (4); Miriam Gössner (2); Andrea Henkel (4)	France Marie-Laure Brunet; Sophie Boilley; Anaïs Bescond; Marie Dorin	Norway Fanny Welle-Strand Horn; Elise Ringen; Synnøve Solemdal; Tora Berger
2013	Norway Hilde Fenne; Ann Kristin Aafedt Flatland; Synnøve Solemdal; Tora Berger	Ukraine Yuliia Dzhima; Vita Semerenko; Valentyna Semerenko; Olena Pidhrushna	Italy Dorothea Wierer; Nicole Gontier; Michela Ponza; Karin Oberhofer
2015	Germany Franziska Hildebrand; Franziska Preuß; Vanessa Hinz; Laura Dahlmeier	France Anaïs Bescond; Enora Latuillière; Justine Braisaz; Marie Dorin Habert	Italy Lisa Vittozzi; Karin Oberhofer; Nicole Gontier; Dorothea Wierer
2016	Norway Synnøve Solemdal; Fanny Horn Birkeland; Tiril Eckhoff; Marte Olsbu	France Justine Braisaz; Anaïs Bescond; Anaïs Chevalier; Marie Dorin Habert	Germany Franziska Preuß; Franziska Hildebrand; Maren Hammerschmidt; Laura Dahlmeier
2017	Germany Vanessa Hinz (2); Maren Hammerschmidt; Franziska Hildebrand (2); Laura Dahlmeier (2)	Ukraine Iryna Varvynets; Yuliia Dzhima; Anastasiya Merkushyna; Olena Pidhrushna	France Anaïs Chevalier; Célia Aymonier; Justine Braisaz; Marie Dorin Habert
2019	Norway Synnøve Solemdal; Ingrid Landmark Tandrevold; Tiril Eckhoff; Marte Olsbu Røiseland	Sweden Linn Persson; Mona Brorsson; Anna Magnusson; Hanna Öberg	Ukraine Anastasiya Merkushyna; Vita Semerenko; Yuliia Dzhima; Valentyna Semerenko
2020	Norway Synnøve Solemdal (4); Ingrid Landmark Tandrevold; Tiril Eckhoff; Marte Olsbu Røiseland	Germany Karolin Horchler; Vanessa Hinz; Franziska Preuß; Denise Herrmann	Ukraine Anastasiya Merkushyna; Yuliia Dzhima; Vita Semerenko; Olena Pidhrushna
2021	Norway Ingrid Landmark Tandrevold (3); Tiril Eckhoff (4); Ida Lien; Marte Olsbu Røiseland (4)	Germany Vanessa Hinz; Janina Hettich; Denise Herrmann; Franziska Preuß	Ukraine Anastasiya Merkushyna; Yuliia Dzhima; Darya Blashko; Olena Pidhrushna
2023	Italy Samuela Comola; Dorothea Wierer; Hannah Auchentaller; Lisa Vittozzi	Germany Vanessa Voigt; Hanna Kebinger; Sophia Schneider; Denise Herrmann-Wick	Sweden Linn Persson; Anna Magnusson; Elvira Öberg; Hanna Öberg
2024	France Lou Jeanmonnot; Sophie Chauveau; Justine Braisaz-Bouchet; Julia Simon	Sweden Anna Magnusson; Linn Persson; Hanna Öberg; Elvira Öberg	Germany Janina Hettich-Walz; Selina Grotian; Vanessa Voigt; Sophia Schneider
2025	France Lou Jeanmonnot (2); Océane Michelon; Justine Braisaz-Bouchet (2); Julia Simon (2)	Norway Karoline Offigstad Knotten; Ingrid Landmark Tandrevold; Ragnhild Femsteinevik; Maren Kirkeeide	Sweden Anna Magnusson; Ella Halvarsson; Hanna Öberg; Elvira Öberg

Medal table

Rank	Nation	Gold	Silver	Bronze	Total
1	Germany	10	7	5	22
2	Soviet Union	8	0	0	8
3	Norway	6	7	5	18
4	Russia	5	2	2	9
5	France	2	8	4	14
6	Italy	1	0	2	3
7	Czech Republic	1	0	0	1
8	Ukraine	0	4	6	10
9	Sweden	0	4	3	7
10	Bulgaria	0	1	0	1
11	Belarus	0	0	2	2
11	Finland	0	0	2	2
13	Czechoslovakia	0	0	1	1
13	United States	0	0	1	1
Totals (14 entries)		**33**	**33**	**33**	**99**

=== Team ===
This event, a patrol race, was held from 1989 to 1998. 1989–93: 15 km. 1994–98: 7.5 km.

Season	Winner	Runner-up	Third
1989	Soviet Union Natalia Prikazchikova; Svetlana Davidova; Luiza Cherepanova; Elena Golovina	Norway Synnøve Thoresen; Elin Kristiansen; Anne Elvebakk; Mona Bollerud	West Germany Inga Kesper; Daniela Hörburger; Dorina Pieper; Petra Schaaf
1990	Soviet Union Elena Batsevich; Elena Golovina; Svetlana Paramygina; Svetlana Davidova	West Germany Irene Schroll; Daniela Hörburger; Inga Kesper; Petra Schaaf	Bulgaria Nadezda Aleksieva; Iva Schkodreva; Maria Manolova; Zvetana Krasteva
1991	Soviet Union Elena Belova; Elena Golovina **(3)**; Svetlana Paramygina; Svetlana Davidova **(3)**	Bulgaria Maria Manolova; Silvana Blogoeva; Nadezda Aleksieva; Iva Schkodreva	Norway Synnøve Thoresen; Signe Trosten; Hildegunn Fossen; Unni Kristiansen
1992	Germany Petra Bauer; Uschi Disl; Inga Kesper; Petra Schaaf	CIS Elena Belova; Inna Sheshkil; Anfisa Reztsova; Svetlana Petcherskaia	Czechoslovakia Gabriela Suvová; Eva Háková; Jana Kulhavá; Jiřína Adamičková
1993	France Nathalie Beausire; Delphyne Heymann; Anne Briand; Corinne Niogret	Belarus Natalia Permiakova; Natalia Sulzheva; Natalia Ryzhenkova; Svetlana Paramygina	Poland Zofia Kiełpińska; Krystyna Liberda; Anna Stera; Helena Mikołajczyk
1994	Belarus Natalia Permiakova; Natalia Ryzhenkova; Irina Kokoueva; Svetlana Paramygina **(3)**	Norway Ann-Elen Skjelbreid; Åse Idland; Annette Sikveland; Hildegunn Fossen	France Emmanuelle Claret; Nathalie Beausire; Corinne Niogret; Véronique Claudel
1995	Norway Elin Kristiansen; Annette Sikveland; Gunn Margit Andreassen; Ann-Elen Skjelbreid	Germany Kathy Schwaab; Simone Greiner-Petter-Memm; Uschi Disl; Petra Behle	France Emmanuelle Claret; Véronique Claudel; Anne Briand; Corinne Niogret
1996	Germany Katrin Apel; Simone Greiner-Petter-Memm; Petra Behle (2); Uschi Disl (2)	Ukraine Nina Lemesh; Olena Petrova; Tetyana Vodopyanova; Olena Zubrilova	France Emmanuelle Claret; Anne Briand; Florence Baverel; Corinne Niogret
1997	Norway Annette Sikveland (2); Ann-Elen Skjelbreid (2); Liv Grete Skjelbreid; Gunn Margit Andreassen (2)	Russia Olga Romasko; Anna Volkova; Nadezhda Talanova; Olga Melnik	Ukraine Olena Petrova; Olena Zubrilova; Valentina Tserbe-Nessina; Tetyana Vodopyanova
1998	Russia Anna Volkova; Olga Romasko; Svetlana Ishmouratova; Albina Akhatova	Norway Hildegunn Mikkelsplass; Annette Sikveland; Ann-Elen Skjelbreid; Liv Grete Skjelbreid	Finland Katja Holanti; Tiina Mikkola; Mari Lampinen; Sanna-Leena Perunka

Medal table

Rank	Nation	Gold	Silver	Bronze	Total
1	Soviet Union	3	0	0	3
2	Norway	2	3	1	6
3	Germany	2	1	0	3
4	Belarus	1	1	0	2
4	Russia	1	1	0	2
6	France	1	0	3	4
7	Bulgaria	0	1	1	2
7	Ukraine	0	1	1	2
7	West Germany	0	1	1	2
10	CIS	0	1	0	1
11	Czechoslovakia	0	0	1	1
11	Finland	0	0	1	1
11	Poland	0	0	1	1
Totals (13 entries)		**10**	**10**	**10**	**30**

== Mixed ==
Numbers in brackets denotes number of victories in corresponding disciplines. Boldface denotes record number of victories.

=== Mixed relay ===
This event was first held in 2005, at the Biathlon World Cup finals in Khanty-Mansiysk. In 2005–20, the women biathletes did the first two legs and the men did the following two (except 2006 when sequence was woman–man–woman–man), the women's ski legs were 6 km each while men ski legs were 7.5 km each (except 2005, 2006 and 2020 when ski legs were 6 km each for all relay members). In 2021, the starting gender became the result of an alternation: for the first time, men opened the relay and women closed it. Since then, this sequence alternates for each following edition. The distance skied became the same for all genders and depending on the one running the first leg (7.5 km if men run first, 6 km if women do), but in 2024 it became 6 km for every relay member no matter who runs first leg.

Season	Winner	Runner-up	Third
2005	Russia Olga Pyleva; Svetlana Ishmouratova; Ivan Tcherezov; Nikolay Kruglov Jr.	Russia Anna Bogaliy-Titovets; Olga Zaitseva; Sergei Tchepikov; Sergei Rozhkov	Germany Uschi Disl; Kati Wilhelm; Michael Greis; Ricco Groß
2006	Russia Anna Bogaliy-Titovets; Sergei Tchepikov; Irina Malgina; Nikolay Kruglov Jr. (2)	Norway Linda Tjørhom; Halvard Hanevold; Tora Berger; Ole Einar Bjørndalen	France Florence Baverel-Robert; Vincent Defrasne; Sandrine Bailly; Raphaël Poirée
2007	Sweden Helena Jonsson; Anna Carin Olofsson; Björn Ferry; Carl Johan Bergman	France Florence Baverel-Robert; Sandrine Bailly; Vincent Defrasne; Raphaël Poirée	Norway Tora Berger; Jori Mørkve; Emil Hegle Svendsen; Frode Andresen
2008	Germany Sabrina Buchholz; Magdalena Neuner; Andreas Birnbacher; Michael Greis	Belarus Liudmila Kalinchik; Darya Domracheva; Rustam Valiullin; Sergey Novikov	Russia Svetlana Sleptsova; Oksana Neupokoeva; Nikolay Kruglov Jr. Dmitri Yaroshenko
2009	France Marie-Laure Brunet; Sylvie Becaert; Vincent Defrasne; Simon Fourcade	Sweden Helena Jonsson; Anna Carin Olofsson-Zidek; David Ekholm; Carl Johan Bergman	Germany Andrea Henkel; Simone Hauswald; Arnd Peiffer; Michael Greis
2010	Germany Simone Hauswald; Magdalena Neuner (2); Simon Schempp; Arnd Peiffer	Norway Ann Kristin Aafedt Flatland; Tora Berger; Emil Hegle Svendsen; Ole Einar Bjørndalen	Sweden Helena Jonsson; Anna Carin Olofsson-Zidek; Björn Ferry; Carl Johan Bergman
2011	Norway Tora Berger; Ann Kristin Aafedt Flatland; Ole Einar Bjørndalen; Tarjei Bø	Germany Andrea Henkel; Magdalena Neuner; Arnd Peiffer; Michael Greis	France Marie-Laure Brunet; Marie Dorin; Alexis Bœuf; Martin Fourcade
2012	Norway Tora Berger; Synnøve Solemdal; Ole Einar Bjørndalen (2); Emil Hegle Svendsen	Slovenia Andreja Mali; Teja Gregorin; Klemen Bauer; Jakov Fak	Germany Andrea Henkel; Magdalena Neuner; Andreas Birnbacher; Arnd Peiffer
2013	Norway Tora Berger (3); Synnøve Solemdal (2); Tarjei Bø; Emil Hegle Svendsen (2)	France Marie-Laure Brunet; Marie Dorin Habert; Alexis Bœuf; Martin Fourcade	Czech Republic Veronika Vítková; Gabriela Soukalová; Jaroslav Soukup; Ondřej Moravec
2015	Czech Republic Veronika Vítková; Gabriela Soukalová; Michal Šlesingr; Ondřej Moravec	France Anaïs Bescond; Marie Dorin Habert; Jean-Guillaume Béatrix; Martin Fourcade	Norway Fanny Welle-Strand Horn; Tiril Eckhoff; Johannes Thingnes Bø; Tarjei Bø
2016	France Anaïs Bescond; Marie Dorin Habert; Quentin Fillon Maillet; Martin Fourcade	Germany Franziska Preuß; Franziska Hildebrand; Arnd Peiffer; Simon Schempp	Norway Marte Olsbu; Tiril Eckhoff; Johannes Thingnes Bø; Tarjei Bø
2017	Germany Vanessa Hinz; Laura Dahlmeier; Arnd Peiffer (2); Simon Schempp (2)	France Anaïs Chevalier; Marie Dorin Habert; Quentin Fillon Maillet; Martin Fourcade	Russia Olga Podchufarova; Tatiana Akimova; Alexander Loginov; Anton Shipulin
2019	Norway Marte Olsbu Røiseland; Tiril Eckhoff; Johannes Thingnes Bø; Vetle Sjåstad Christiansen	Germany Vanessa Hinz; Denise Herrmann; Arnd Peiffer; Benedikt Doll	Italy Lisa Vittozzi; Dorothea Wierer; Lukas Hofer; Dominik Windisch
2020	Norway Marte Olsbu Røiseland; Tiril Eckhoff; Tarjei Bø (3); Johannes Thingnes Bø	Italy Lisa Vittozzi; Dorothea Wierer; Lukas Hofer; Dominik Windisch	Czech Republic Eva Kristejn Puskarčíková; Markéta Davidová; Ondřej Moravec; Michal Krčmář
2021	Norway Sturla Holm Lægreid; Johannes Thingnes Bø; Tiril Eckhoff (3); Marte Olsbu Røiseland	Austria David Komatz; Simon Eder; Dunja Zdouc; Lisa Theresa Hauser	Sweden Sebastian Samuelsson; Martin Ponsiluoma; Linn Persson; Hanna Öberg
2023	Norway Ingrid Landmark Tandrevold; Marte Olsbu Røiseland **(4)**; Sturla Holm Lægreid (2); Johannes Thingnes Bø **(4)**	Italy Lisa Vittozzi; Dorothea Wierer; Didier Bionaz; Tommaso Giacomel	France Julia Simon; Anaïs Chevalier-Bouchet; Émilien Jacquelin; Quentin Fillon Maillet
2024	France Éric Perrot; Quentin Fillon Maillet (2); Justine Braisaz-Bouchet; Julia Simon	Norway Tarjei Bø; Johannes Thingnes Bø; Karoline Offigstad Knotten; Ingrid Landmark Tandrevold	Sweden Sebastian Samuelsson; Martin Ponsiluoma; Hanna Öberg; Elvira Öberg
2025	France Julia Simon (2); Lou Jeanmonnot; Éric Perrot (2); Émilien Jacquelin	Czech Republic Jessica Jislová; Tereza Voborníková; Vítězslav Hornig; Michal Krčmář	Germany Selina Grotian; Franziska Preuß; Philipp Nawrath; Justus Strelow

Medal table

Rank	Nation	Gold	Silver	Bronze	Total
1	Norway	7	3	3	13
2	France	4	4	3	11
3	Germany	3	3	4	10
4	Russia	2	1	2	5
5	Sweden	1	1	3	5
6	Czech Republic	1	1	2	4
7	Italy	0	2	1	3
8	Austria	0	1	0	1
8	Belarus	0	1	0	1
8	Slovenia	0	1	0	1
Totals (10 entries)		**18**	**18**	**18**	**54**

=== Single mixed relay ===
This event was first held in 2019. Each team consists of two members - man and woman. The first of the team members runs the first and third legs (3 km each), the other team member – the second and fourth legs (3 km and 4.5 km respectively). In 2019 and 2020 the women biathletes started single mixed relay and the men biathletes finished it, but in 2021 this order was reversed. Since then, this order alternates for each following edition.

Season	Winner	Runner-up	Third
2019	Norway Marte Olsbu Røiseland; Johannes Thingnes Bø	Italy Dorothea Wierer; Lukas Hofer	Sweden Hanna Öberg; Sebastian Samuelsson
2020	Norway Marte Olsbu Røiseland; Johannes Thingnes Bø	Germany Franziska Preuß; Erik Lesser	France Anaïs Bescond; Émilien Jacquelin
2021	France Antonin Guigonnat; Julia Simon	Norway Johannes Thingnes Bø; Tiril Eckhoff	Sweden Sebastian Samuelsson; Hanna Öberg
2023	Norway Marte Olsbu Røiseland **(3)**; Johannes Thingnes Bø **(3)**	Austria Lisa Theresa Hauser; David Komatz	Italy Lisa Vittozzi; Tommaso Giacomel
2024	France Quentin Fillon Maillet; Lou Jeanmonnot	Italy Tommaso Giacomel; Lisa Vittozzi	Norway Johannes Thingnes Bø; Ingrid Landmark Tandrevold
2025	France Julia Simon; Quentin Fillon Maillet (2)	Norway Ragnhild Femsteinevik; Johannes Thingnes Bø	Germany Franziska Preuß; Justus Strelow

Medal table

Rank	Nation	Gold	Silver	Bronze	Total
1	Norway	3	2	1	6
2	France	3	0	1	4
3	Italy	0	2	1	3
4	Germany	0	1	1	2
5	Austria	0	1	0	1
6	Sweden	0	0	2	2
Totals (6 entries)		**6**	**6**	**6**	**18**

== Total medals by country ==
Updated after the 2025 Championships.

Rank	Nation	Gold	Silver	Bronze	Total
1	Norway	97	85	75	257
2	Germany	65	56	41	162
3	France	51	40	52	143
4	Soviet Union	44	29	21	94
5	Russia	28	39	28	95
6	Sweden	19	21	33	73
7	East Germany	19	12	10	41
8	Italy	12	14	14	40
9	Finland	10	10	17	37
10	Ukraine	7	11	21	39
11	Belarus	6	9	14	29
12	Czech Republic	6	7	9	22
13	Austria	3	8	11	22
14	West Germany	2	4	7	13
15	Slovenia	2	2	1	5
16	Poland	1	6	7	14
17	United States	1	6	1	8
18	Canada	1	2	1	4
18	Slovakia	1	2	1	4
20	CIS	1	1	0	2
21	Bulgaria	0	4	4	8
22	China	0	3	0	3
23	Czechoslovakia	0	1	3	4
24	Latvia	0	1	2	3
25	Romania	0	1	0	1
26	Croatia	0	0	1	1
26	Estonia	0	0	1	1
26	Russian Biathlon Union	0	0	1	1
Totals (28 entries)		376	374	376	1,126

== Multiple medalists ==
Boldface denotes active biathletes and highest medal count among all biathletes (including these who not included in these tables) per type.

=== Men ===
==== All events ====
Rank	Biathlete	Country	From	To	Gold	Silver	Bronze	Total
1	Johannes Thingnes Bø	Norway	2015	2025	**23**	**14**	6	43
2	Ole Einar Bjørndalen	Norway	1997	2017	20	**14**	**11**	**45**
3	Martin Fourcade	France	2011	2020	13	10	5	28
4	Tarjei Bø	Norway	2011	2025	12	7	9	28
5	Emil Hegle Svendsen	Norway	2007	2016	12	6	3	21
6	Frank Luck	East Germany; Germany	1989	2004	11	5	4	20
7	Alexander Tikhonov	Soviet Union	1967	1979	11	4	2	17
8	Ricco Groß	Germany	1991	2007	9	5	6	20
9	Frank Ullrich	East Germany	1977	1983	9	4	1	14
10	Raphaël Poirée	France	1998	2007	8	3	7	18

==== Individual events ====
Rank	Biathlete	Country	From	To	Gold	Silver	Bronze	Total
1	Johannes Thingnes Bø	Norway	2015	2025	**12**	**7**	3	22
2	Ole Einar Bjørndalen	Norway	1997	2017	11	6	**9**	**26**
3	Martin Fourcade	France	2011	2020	11	4	3	18
4	Raphaël Poirée	France	1998	2007	7	2	5	14
5	Emil Hegle Svendsen	Norway	2008	2016	5	3	2	10
6	Frank Ullrich	East Germany	1978	1983	5	3	–	8
7	Alexander Tikhonov	Soviet Union	1969	1979	5	2	1	8
8	Ricco Groß	Germany	1995	2005	4	3	3	10
9	Mark Kirchner	East Germany; Germany	1990	1993	4	–	–	4
10	Eirik Kvalfoss	Norway	1982	1991	3	4	2	9

=== Women ===
==== All events ====
Rank	Biathlete	Country	From	To	Gold	Silver	Bronze	Total
1	Marte Olsbu Røiseland	Norway	2016	2023	**13**	–	4	17
2	Magdalena Neuner	Germany	2007	2012	12	4	1	17
3	Tiril Eckhoff	Norway	2015	2021	10	2	3	15
4	Elena Golovina	Soviet Union	1985	1991	10	1	1	12
5	**Julia Simon**	France	2021	2025	10	–	3	13
6	Petra Behle (Schaaf)	West Germany; Germany	1988	1997	9	2	2	13
7	Uschi Disl	Germany	1991	2005	8	**8**	3	**19**
8	Andrea Henkel	Germany	2000	2013	8	6	2	16
9	Tora Berger	Norway	2006	2013	8	5	5	18
10	Liv Grete Poirée (Skjelbreid)	Norway	1997	2004	8	3	2	13

==== Individual events ====
Rank	Biathlete	Country	From	To	Gold	Silver	Bronze	Total
1	Magdalena Neuner	Germany	2007	2012	**6**	2	–	8
2	Magdalena Forsberg (Wallin)	Sweden	1996	2001	**6**	1	**5**	**12**
3	Liv Grete Poirée (Skjelbreid)	Norway	2000	2004	**6**	1	2	9
4	Olena Zubrilova	Ukraine; Belarus	1997	2005	4	**4**	3	11
5	Laura Dahlmeier	Germany	2015	2019	4	3	4	11
6	Tora Berger	Norway	2008	2013	4	3	2	9
7	Marie Dorin Habert	France	2015	2016	4	1	1	6
8	Andrea Henkel	Germany	2005	2013	4	1	–	5
9	**Julia Simon**	France	2023	2025	4	–	2	6
10	Petra Schaaf	West Germany; Germany	1988	1993	4	–	1	5

== See also ==
- Biathlon World Cup
- Summer Biathlon World Championships
- Biathlon Junior World Championships
- List of Olympic medalists in biathlon
