= Antti Tyrväinen (biathlete) =

Finnish biathlete (1933–2013)

Personal information
- Full name: Antti Eerkki Tyrväinen
- Born: 5 November 1933 Ylöjärvi, Finland
- Died: 13 October 2013 (aged 79) Tampere, Finland
- Height: 1.72 m (5 ft 8 in)

Sport

Professional information
- Sport: Biathlon

Olympic Games
- Teams: 2 (1960, 1964)
- Medals: 1 (0 gold)

World Championships
- Teams: 6 (1959, 1961, 1962, 1963, 1965, 1966)
- Medals: 6 (1 gold)
Medal record
Men's biathlon
Representing Finland
Olympic Games
Silver medal – second place	1960 Squaw Valley	20 km individual
World Championships
Gold medal – first place	1961 Umeå	Team event
Silver medal – second place	1962 Hämeenlinna	20 km individual
Silver medal – second place	1962 Hämeenlinna	Team event
Silver medal – second place	1963 Seefeld	20 km individual
Silver medal – second place	1963 Seefeld	Team event
Bronze medal – third place	1965 Elverum	20 km individual

Antti Eerkki Tyrväinen (5 November 1933 – 13 October 2013) was a Finnish biathlete and Olympic medalist. He received a silver medal at the 1960 Winter Olympics in Squaw Valley, and silver medals in the World Championships in 1962 and 1963 together with a bronze medal in 1965. He was born in Ylöjärvi.

== Biathlon results ==
All results are sourced from the International Biathlon Union.

=== Olympic Games ===
1 medal (1 silver)

Event	Individual
(United States) 1960 Squaw Valley	Silver
(Austria) 1964 Innsbruck	13th

=== World Championships ===
6 medals (1 gold, 4 silver, 1 bronze)

Event	Individual	Team (time)	Relay
(Italy) 1959 Courmayeur	17th	4th	—N/a
(Sweden) 1961 Umeå	5th	Gold	—N/a
(Finland) 1962 Hämeenlinna	Silver	Silver	—N/a
(Austria) 1963 Seefeld	Silver	Silver	—N/a
(Norway) 1965 Elverum	Bronze	5th	—N/a
(West Germany) 1966 Garmisch-Partenkirchen	17th	—N/a	5th

*During Olympic seasons competitions are only held for those events not included in the Olympic program.
**The team (time) event was removed in 1965, whilst the relay was added in 1966.
