= Klas Lestander =

Swedish biathlete (1931–2023)

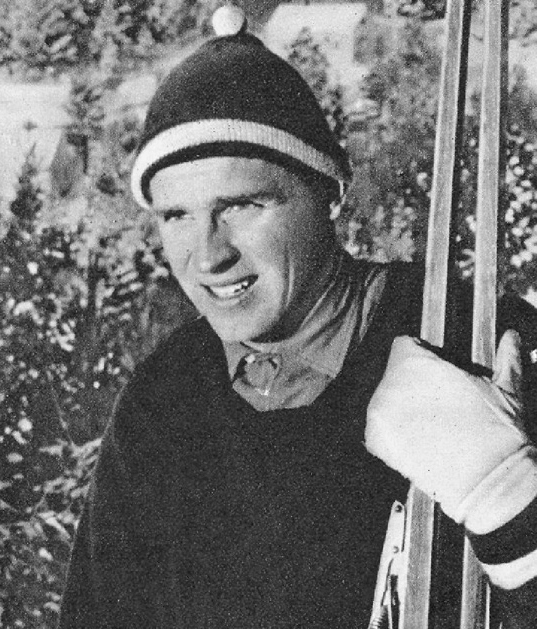

Personal information
- Full name: Klas Ivar Vilhelm Lestander
- Born: 18 April 1931 Arjeplog, Sweden
- Died: 13 January 2023 (aged 91) Arjeplog, Sweden

Sport

Professional information
- Sport: Biathlon
- Club: Arjeplogs SF

Olympic Games
- Teams: 1 (1960)
- Medals: 1 (1 gold)

World Championships
- Teams: 1 (1961)
- Medals: 1 (0 gold)
Medal record
Representing Sweden
Olympic Games
Gold medal – first place	1960 Squaw Valley	20 km individual
World Championships
Bronze medal – third place	1961 Umeå	Team event

Klas Ivar Vilhelm Lestander (18 April 1931 – 13 January 2023) was a Swedish biathlete who won a gold medal at the 1960 Winter Olympics in Squaw Valley.

Lestander started as a cross-country skier, but he was also an experienced hunter, and thus ended up with biathlon. At the 1960 Olympics he placed 15th out of 30 in skiing, but became the first international competitor to ever hit all 20 targets, and hence won the gold medal. His rival Aleksandr Privalov needed to clear three targets out of five at the last post to win the event, but managed only two, and ended up with a bronze medal. Meanwhile, the fastest skier Victor Arbez hit only 2 targets out of 20, and placed 25th overall.

Next year Lestander finished ninth individually at the World Championships in Umeå and third with the Swedish team. He retired the same year, never winning a Swedish Championship.

Lestander lived all his life in Arjeplog, where a square is named after him. He was a cousin of the forest worker and Left Party Member of Parliament Paul Lestander. His son, Dan Lestander, was an artist and won the snow sculpture contest at the Olympic Arts Festival in Albertville, France, in 1992.

Lestander died at his home in Arjeplog on 13 January 2023, at the age of 91.
