= Vladimir Melanin =

Soviet biathlete

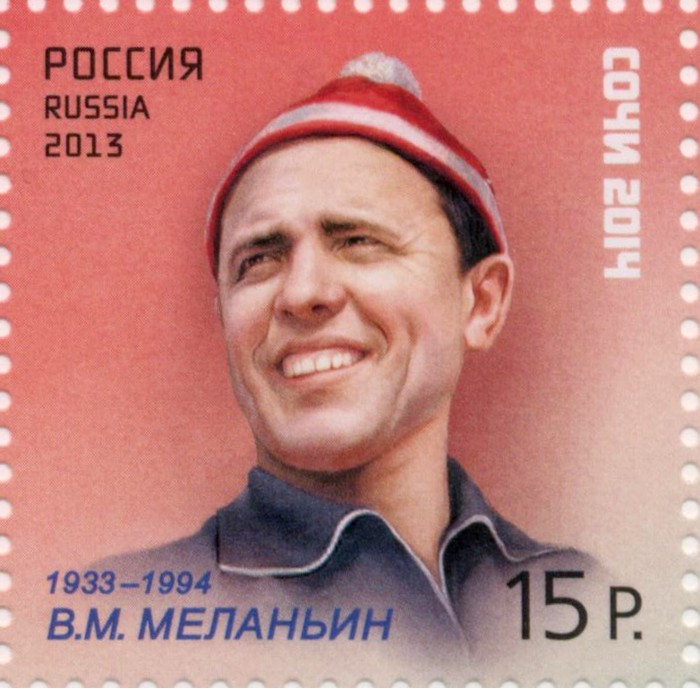
- Vladimir Melanin on a 2013 Russian stamp from the series "Sports Legends".

Personal information
- Full name: Vladimir Mikhailovich Melanin
- Born: 1 December 1933 Sovetsky District, RSFSR, Soviet Union
- Died: 10 August 1994 (aged 60) Kirov, Russia
- Height: 1.72 m (5 ft 8 in)

Sport

Professional information
- Sport: Biathlon
- Club: VS Kirov

Olympic Games
- Teams: 2 (1960, 1964)
- Medals: 1 (1 gold)

World Championships
- Teams: 5 (1959, 1962, 1963, 1965, 1966)
- Medals: 7 (6 gold)
Medal record
Men's biathlon
Representing Soviet Union
Olympic Games
Gold medal – first place	1964 Innsbruck	20 km individual
World Championships
Gold medal – first place	1959 Courmayeur	20 km individual
Gold medal – first place	1959 Courmayeur	Team event
Gold medal – first place	1962 Hämeenlinna	20 km individual
Gold medal – first place	1962 Hämeenlinna	Team event
Gold medal – first place	1963 Seefeld	20 km individual
Gold medal – first place	1963 Seefeld	Team event
Silver medal – second place	1965 Elverum	Team event

Vladimir Mikhailovich Melanin (Russian: Владимир Михайлович Меланьин; 1 December 1933 – 10 August 1994) was a Soviet biathlete.

== Life and career ==
He won an Olympic gold medal for the USSR in the 20 km individual in the 1964 Olympics in Innsbruck ahead of his fellow Soviet Aleksandr Privalov and the Norwegian Olav Jordet. Melanin also won three individual world titles in the 20 km, in 1959, 1962 and 1963.

Melanin started as a cross-country skier, but changed to biathlon while. His strong skiing base helped him win all his titles, as his shooting skills were mediocre. Because of poor shooting, he finished outside of the podium at his first Olympics in 1960. He improved a lot by the next Games, where he showed not only best skiing time, but also clean shooting. He finished more than 3 minutes ahead of his rivals, which remains the largest victory margin in any Olympic biathlon event. Domestically Melanin won only two titles, in the 20 km in 1959 and 1966. After retiring from competitions Melanin worked as a biathlon coach and managed a cross-country skiing and biathlon complex in Kirov Oblast. He received posthumously the International Biathlon Union Honorary Award.

== Biathlon results ==
All results are sourced from the International Biathlon Union.

=== Olympic Games ===
1 medal (1 gold)

Event	Individual
(United States) 1960 Squaw Valley	4th
(Austria) 1964 Innsbruck	Gold

=== World Championships ===
7 medals (6 gold, 1 silver)

Event	Individual	Team (time)	Relay
(Italy) 1959 Courmayeur	Gold	Gold	—N/a
(Finland) 1962 Hämeenlinna	Gold	Gold	—N/a
(Austria) 1963 Seefeld	Gold	Gold	—N/a
(Norway) 1965 Elverum	7th	Silver	—N/a
(West Germany) 1966 Garmisch-Partenkirchen	21st	—N/a	4th

*During Olympic seasons competitions are only held for those events not included in the Olympic program.
**The team (time) event was removed in 1965, whilst the relay was added in 1966.
