= Sture Ohlin =

Swedish biathlete (1935–2023)

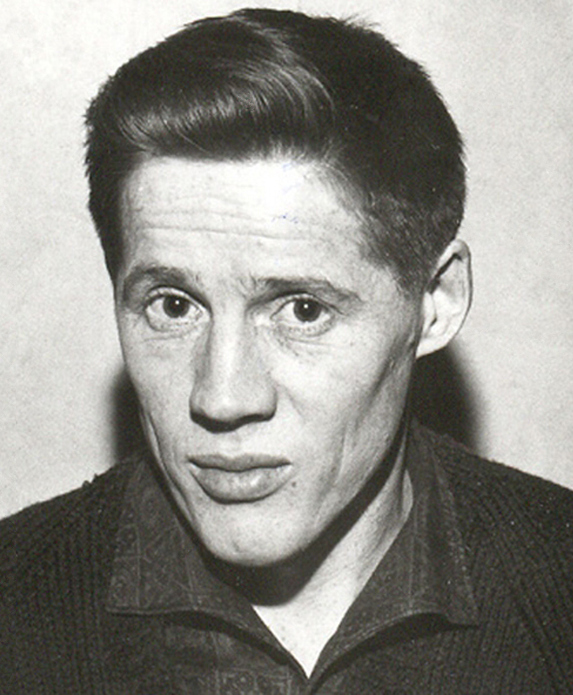
- Ohlin by the mid 1960s

Personal information
- Born: 3 May 1935 Arjeplog, Sweden
- Died: 22 November 2023 (aged 88) Malå, Sweden

Sport
- Sport: Biathlon
- Club: Arjeplogs SF
Medal record
Representing Sweden
Biathlon World Championships
Gold medal – first place	1958 Saalfelden	20 km team
Silver medal – second place	1959 Courmayeur	20 km team
Bronze medal – third place	1966 Garmisch-Partenkirchen	4×7.5 km
Bronze medal – third place	1967 Altenberg	4×7.5 km

Bo Sture Roland Ohlin (3 May 1935 – 22 November 2023) was a Swedish biathlon competitor who won four team medals at the world championships in 1958–67. He competed at the 1964 Winter Olympics and finished 12th.

As part of the Swedish team, he won the unofficial relay event during the 1958 World Championships.

Ohlin died in Malå on 22 November 2023, at the age of 88.
