= Dmitri Sokolov (biathlete) =

Russian biathlete

Personal information
- Born: 20 May 1924 Fadyushino, Yurgamyshsky District, Ural Oblast, Russian Soviet Federative Socialist Republic, Union of Soviet Socialist Republics (now Kurgan Oblast, Russia)
- Died: 4 July 2009 (aged 85) Kurgan, Kurgan Oblast, Russia

Sport
- Sport: Biathlon
- Club: Dynamo Ufa
Medal record
Representing Soviet Union
Biathlon World Championships
Silver medal – second place	1958 Saalfelden	20 km team
Gold medal – first place	1959 Courmayeur	20 km team
Silver medal – second place	1959 Courmayeur	20 km ind.
Silver medal – second place	1961 Umeå	20 km team

Dmitri Petrovich Sokolov (Russian: Дмитрий Петрович Соколов; 20 May 1924 – 4 July 2009) was a Russian biathlon competitor who won one gold and three silver medals at the world championships in 1958–61. He competed at the 1960 Winter Olympics and finished sixth.

== Life and work ==
Dmitri Petrovich Sokolov was born on 20 May 1924 in the village of Fadyushino, Yurgamyshsky District, Kurgansky Okrug, Ural Oblast, Russian Soviet Federative Socialist Republic, Union of Soviet Socialist Republics (now Kurgan Oblast, Russia).

After graduating from school Sokolov worked at a cement factory in Chelyabinsk and between 1942 and 1952 served in the Red Army (from 1946 – Soviet Army). He fought in World War II and in 1985 was awarded the Order of the Patriotic War.

In 1952-1958 he lived in Kurgan, Kurgan Oblast, worked as a coach in skiing and biathlon.

In 1958–1964 he lived in Ufa, Bashkir Autonomous Soviet Socialist Republic, while competing himself, Sokolov coached biathlon and cross-country skiing.

Since 1966 he lived in Kurgan, Kurgan Oblast,

Buried in the Zajkovskoe cemetery in Kurgan, Kurgan Oblast, Russia.

== Awards and honours ==
- Order of the Patriotic War 2nd class (1985)
- Medal "For Distinguished Labour" (1959)
- Medal "For the Victory over Germany in the Great Patriotic War 1941–1945" (1945)
- Honored Coach of the RSFSR (1965)
- Honored Master of Sports of Russia (1995)
