= Henry Hermansen =

Norwegian cross-country skier (1921–1997)

Medal record

Men's biathlon

Representing Norway

World Championships
Bronze medal – third place	1958 Saalfelden	Team event
Bronze medal – third place	1962 Hämeenlinna	Team event

Men's cross-country skiing

World Championships
Bronze medal – third place	1950 Lake Placid	4 × 10 km relay

Henry Hermansen (13 April 1921, Lunner – 18 January 1997) was a Norwegian cross-country skier who competed in the 1950s. He won a bronze medal in the 4 × 10 km relay at the 1950 FIS Nordic World Ski Championships.

== Cross-country skiing results ==
=== World Championships ===
- 1 medal – (1 bronze)

Year	Age	18 km	50 km	4 × 10 km relay
1950	28	15	DNF	Bronze
