= Adolf Wiklund =

Adolf Wiklund may refer to:

- Adolf Wiklund (musician) (1879–1950), Swedish composer and conductor
- Adolf Wiklund (biathlete) (1921–1970), Swedish biathlete
