= Biathlon World Championships 1979 =

17th edition of the Biathlon World Championships

- Host city: Ruhpolding, Bavaria
- Country: West Germany
- Events: 3
- Opening: 15 February 1979
- Closing: 18 February 1979

The 17th Biathlon World Championships were held in 1979 in Ruhpolding, West Germany.

== Men's results ==
=== 20 km individual ===
Medal	Name	Nation	Penalties	Result
1st place, gold medalist(s)	Klaus Siebert	GDR	-	-
2nd place, silver medalist(s)	Alexander Tikhonov	URS	-	-
3rd place, bronze medalist(s)	Sigleif Johansen	NOR	-	-

=== 10 km sprint ===
Medal	Name	Nation	Penalties	Result
1st place, gold medalist(s)	Frank Ullrich	GDR	-	-
2nd place, silver medalist(s)	Odd Lirhus	NOR	-	-
3rd place, bronze medalist(s)	Luigi Weiss	ITA	-	-

=== 4 × 7.5 km relay ===
Medal	Name	Nation	Penalties	Result
1st place, gold medalist(s)	East Germany Manfred Beer; Klaus Siebert; Frank Ullrich; Eberhard Rösch	GDR		
2nd place, silver medalist(s)	Finland Simo Halonen; Heikki Ikola; Erkki Antila; Raimo Seppänen	FIN		
3rd place, bronze medalist(s)	Soviet Union Vladimir Alikin; Vladimir Barnashov; Nikolay Kruglov; Alexander Tikhonov	URS		

== Medal table ==
Place	Nation	1st place, gold medalist(s)	2nd place, silver medalist(s)	3rd place, bronze medalist(s)	Total
1	East Germany	3	0	0	3
2	Norway	0	1	1	2
2	Soviet Union	0	1	1	2
4	Finland	0	1	0	1
5	Italy	0	0	1	1
