= Sven Agge =

Swedish biathlete (1925–2004)

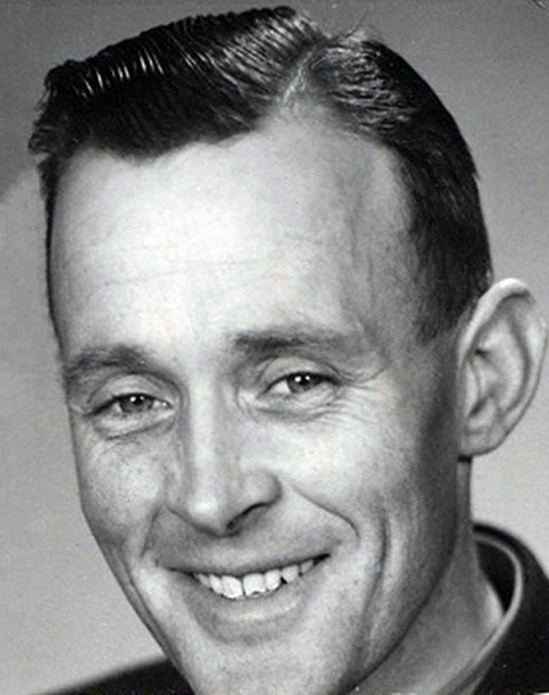
- Sven Agge, circa 1960

Personal information
- Born: June 16, 1925 Siljansnäs, Sweden
- Died: February 5, 2004 Siljansnäs, Sweden

Sport
- Sport: Biathlon
- Club: Leksands Skyttegille, Tällberg
Medal record
Representing Sweden
Biathlon World Championships
Silver medal – second place	1959 Courmayeur	20 km team
Bronze medal – third place	1959 Courmayeur	20 km ind.

Sven Ingvar Agge (16 June 1925 – 5 February 2004) was a Swedish biathlon competitor who won an individual bronze medal at the 1959 World Championships. He competed in the 20 km event at the 1960 Winter Olympics and finished 16th.

In September 2013, he was appointed into the Swedish Biathlon Hall of Fame.
