= Biathlon World Championships 1963 =

Sports competition in Seefeld, Austria

- Host city: Seefeld, Tyrol
- Country: Austria
- Events: 2
- Opening: 3 February 1963
- Closing: 3 February 1963

The 5th Biathlon World Championships were held in 1963 in Seefeld, Austria. The men's 20 km individual and team were the only competitions.

== Men's results ==
=== 20 km individual ===
Medal	Name	Nation	Penalties	Result	Behind
1st place, gold medalist(s)	Vladimir Melanin	URS	2	1:32:06.8	
2nd place, silver medalist(s)	Antti Tyrväinen	FIN	2	1:33:46.7	1:39.9
3rd place, bronze medalist(s)	Hannu Posti	FIN	2	1:35:02.1	2:55.3

Each shot missing the target gave a penalty of 2 minutes.

=== 20 km team ===
Medal	Name	Nation	Penalties	Result	Behind
1st place, gold medalist(s)	Soviet Union	URS	7	4:45:56.7	
2nd place, silver medalist(s)	Finland	FIN	10	4:46:02.5	5.8
3rd place, bronze medalist(s)	Norway	NOR	11	5:03:55.5	17:58.8

The times of the top 3 athletes from each nation in the individual race were added together.

== Medal table ==
Place	Nation	1st place, gold medalist(s)	2nd place, silver medalist(s)	3rd place, bronze medalist(s)	Total
1	Soviet Union	2	0	0	2
2	Finland	0	2	1	3
3	Norway	0	0	1	1
