= Biathlon World Championships 1978 =

Sports competition in Hochfilzen, Austria

- Host city: Hochfilzen, Tyrol
- Country: Austria
- Events: 3
- Opening: 2 March 1978
- Closing: 5 March 1978

The 16th Biathlon World Championships were held in 1978 in Hochfilzen, Austria.

== Men's results ==
=== 20 km individual ===
Medal	Name	Nation	Penalties	Result
1st place, gold medalist(s)	Odd Lirhus	NOR	1	1:05:25.3
2nd place, silver medalist(s)	Frank Ullrich	GDR	2	1:05:37.7
3rd place, bronze medalist(s)	Eberhard Rösch	GDR	2	1:06:04.2

=== 10 km sprint ===
Medal	Name	Nation	Penalties	Result
1st place, gold medalist(s)	Frank Ullrich	GDR	0	32:17.4
2nd place, silver medalist(s)	Eberhard Rösch	GDR	0	32:38.1
3rd place, bronze medalist(s)	Klaus Siebert	GDR	0	33:02.8

=== 4 × 7.5 km relay ===
Medal	Name	Nation	Penalties	Result
1st place, gold medalist(s)	East Germany Manfred Beer; Klaus Siebert; Frank Ullrich; Eberhard Rösch	GDR		
2nd place, silver medalist(s)	Norway Tor Svendsberget; Roar Nilsen; Odd Lirhus; Sigleif Johansen	NOR		
3rd place, bronze medalist(s)	West Germany Heinrich Mehringer; Hans Estner; Andreas Schweiger; Gerd Winkler	FRG		

== Medal table ==
Place	Nation	1st place, gold medalist(s)	2nd place, silver medalist(s)	3rd place, bronze medalist(s)	Total
1	East Germany	2	2	2	6
2	Norway	1	1	0	2
3	West Germany	0	0	1	1
