= Tage Lundin =

Swedish biathlete (1933–2019)

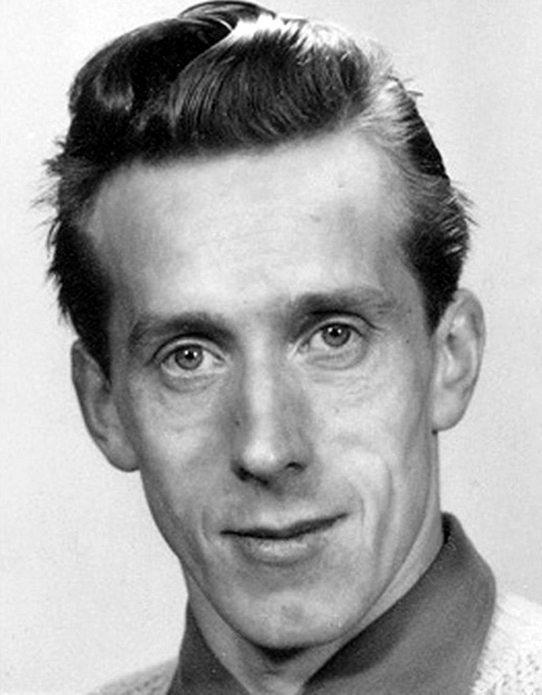

Personal information
- Born: 11 November 1933 Stensele, Storuman, Sweden
- Died: 6 August 2019 (aged 85)

Sport
- Sport: Biathlon
- Club: IK Berguven, Stensele, Storuman
Medal record
Representing Sweden
Biathlon World Championships
| Bronze medal – third place | 1961 Umeå | 20 km team |

Tage Leif Lundin (11 November 1933 – 6 August 2019) was a Swedish biathlon competitor who won a team bronze medal at the 1961 World Championships. He competed at the 1960 Winter Olympics and finished 12th.
