= Eberhard Rösch =

German biathlete

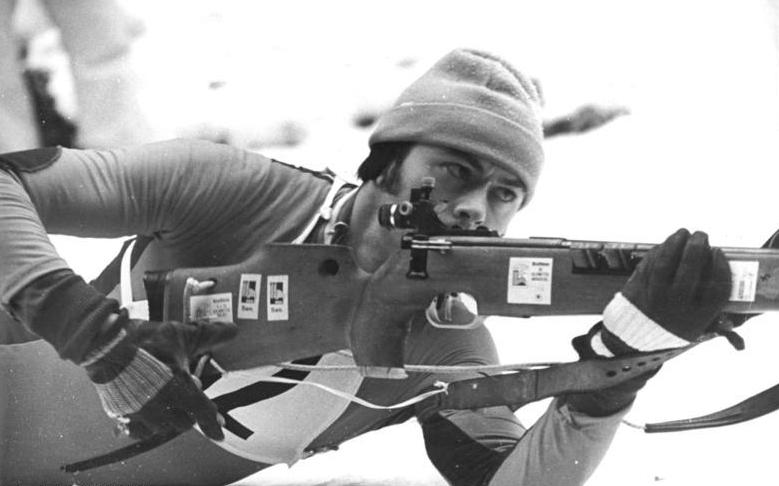
- Eberhard Rösch in 1980.

Personal information
- Full name: Eberhard Rösch
- Born: 9 April 1954 (age 72) Karl-Marx-Stadt, East Germany

Sport

Professional information
- Sport: Biathlon
- Club: SG Dynamo Zinnwald
- World Cup debut: 13 January 1978

Olympic Games
- Teams: 1 (1980)
- Medals: 2 (0 gold)

World Championships
- Teams: 4 (1977, 1978, 1979, 1981)
- Medals: 5 (3 gold)

World Cup
- Seasons: 4 (1977/78–1980/81)
- Individual victories: 1
- Individual podiums: 10
Medal record
Men's biathlon
Representing East Germany
Olympic Games
Silver medal – second place	1980 Lake Placid	4 × 7.5 km relay
Bronze medal – third place	1980 Lake Placid	20 km individual
World Championships
Gold medal – first place	1978 Hochfilzen	4 × 7.5 km relay
Gold medal – first place	1979 Ruhpolding	4 × 7.5 km relay
Gold medal – first place	1981 Lahti	4 × 7.5 km relay
Silver medal – second place	1978 Hochfilzen	10 km sprint
Bronze medal – third place	1978 Hochfilzen	20 km individual

Eberhard Rösch (born 9 April 1954) is a former East German biathlete.

Rösch finished third overall in the World Cup in the 1977–78 and 1979–80 seasons. He worked for 17 years as a Stasi informer. He is the father of the currently active biathlete Michael Rösch.

== Biathlon results ==
All results are sourced from the International Biathlon Union.

=== Olympic Games ===
2 medals (1 silver, 1 bronze)

Event	Individual	Sprint	Relay
(United States) 1980 Lake Placid	Bronze	—	Silver

=== World Championships ===
5 medals (3 gold, 1 silver, 1 bronze)

Event	Individual	Sprint	Relay
(Norway) 1977 Lillehammer	34th	—	—
(Austria) 1978 Hochfilzen	Bronze	Silver	Gold
(West Germany) 1979 Ruhpolding	9th	28th	Gold
(Finland) 1981 Lahti	12th	—	Gold

*During Olympic seasons competitions are only held for those events not included in the Olympic program.

=== Individual victories ===
1 victory (1 Sp)

Season	Date	Location	Discipline	Level
1979–80; 1 victory (1 Sp)	29 March 1980	(Soviet Union) Murmansk	10 km sprint	Biathlon World Cup

*Results are from UIPMB and IBU races which include the Biathlon World Cup, Biathlon World Championships and the Winter Olympic Games.
