= Adolf Wiklund (biathlete) =

Swedish biathlete (1921–1970)

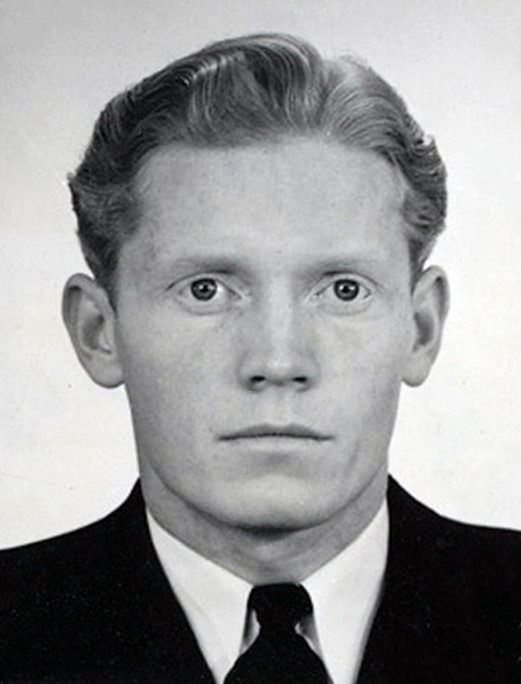
- Adolf Wiklund

Personal information
- Born: Adolf Jakob Wiklund; 19 December 1921 Bodum, Sweden
- Died: 21 September 1970 (aged 48) Frösön, Sweden

Sport
- Sport: Biathlon
- Club: F4 IF, Östersund
- Retired: 1961
Medal record
Representing Sweden
Biathlon World Championships
Gold medal – first place	1958 Saalfelden	20 km ind.
Gold medal – first place	1958 Saalfelden	20 km team
Silver medal – second place	1959 Courmayeur	20 km team

Adolf Jakob Wiklund (19 December 1921 – 21 September 1970) was a Swedish biathlon competitor who won two world championship titles in 1958, individual (20 km) and with a team. He competed at the 1960 Winter Olympics and finished 19th.

He was elected for the Swedish Biathlon Hall of Fame in September 2013.

== Career ==
Wiklund initially began his cross-country skiing career in 1948, having previously worked as a flight technician at a military airfield. At the first biathlon world championships in Saalfelden in 1958, he won the 20 km distance and was the first biathlon world champion. He also won a gold medal with the still unofficially held relay. A year later, he won a silver medal in Courmayeur with the still unofficial relay behind the team from the Soviet Union and finished 9th in the individual over 20 km.

At the 1960 Winter Olympics in Squaw Valley, he finished 19th and retired the following year.

== Personal life ==
Wiklund, who lived in Frösön, practiced various sports and he was also a football player, a cross-country, and steeplechase runner.
