= Kalevi Huuskonen =

Finnish biathlete

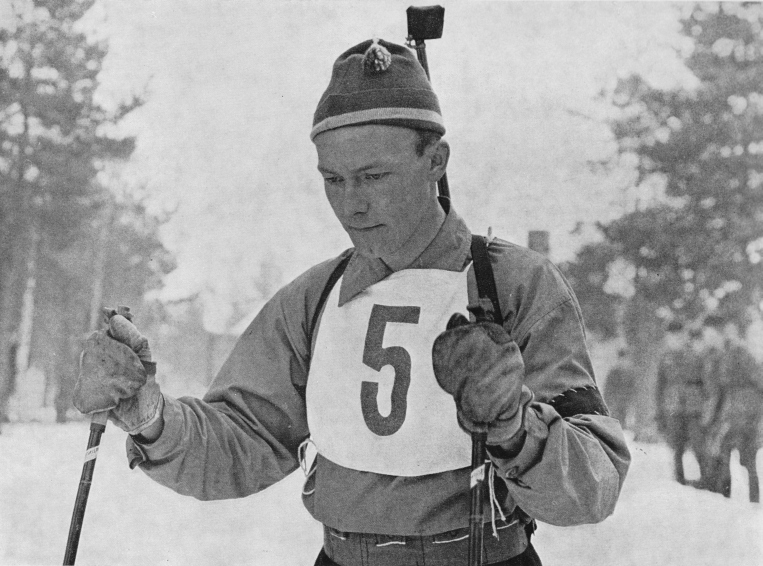
Kalevi Huuskonen in 1961.

Kauko Kalevi Huuskonen (21 April 1932, in Vesanto – 7 January 1999) was a Finnish biathlete. He won the 1961 Biathlon World Championships in the individual 20 kilometre event. The same year, he was named Finnish Sports Personality of the Year.
