= Erwin Fiedor =

Polish skier (1943–2012)

Personal information
- Born: 20 May 1943 Koniaków, Poland
- Died: 14 February 2012 (aged 68) Koniaków, Poland

Sport
- Sport: Skiing
- Updated on 6 August 2012

Erwin Fiedor (20 May 1943 – 14 February 2012) was a Polish ski jumper and Nordic combined skier. He competed at the 1964 and 1968 Winter Olympics.
