= Manfred Beer =

East German biathlete

Personal information
- Full name: Manfred Beer
- Born: 2 December 1953 (age 72) Altenberg, Bezirk Dresden, East Germany
- Height: 1.75 m (5 ft 9 in)

Sport

Professional information
- Sport: Biathlon
- Club: SG Dynamo Zinnwald
- World Cup debut: 13 January 1978

Olympic Games
- Teams: 1 (1976)
- Medals: 1 (0 gold)

World Championships
- Teams: 4 (1974, 1977, 1978, 1979)
- Medals: 3 (2 gold)

World Cup
- Seasons: 3 (1977/78–1979/80)
- Individual victories: 0
- Individual podiums: 1
Medal record
Men's biathlon
Representing East Germany
Olympic Games
Bronze medal – third place	1976 Innsbruck	4 × 7.5 km relay
World Championships
Gold medal – first place	1978 Hochfilzen	4 × 7.5 km relay
Gold medal – first place	1979 Ruhpolding	4 × 7.5 km relay
Bronze medal – third place	1977 Lillehammer	4 × 7.5 km relay

Manfred Beer (born 2 December 1953) is a former East German biathlete. During his career, he won a bronze medal at the 1976 Winter Olympics as part of the East German 4 × 7.5 km relay team and two gold medals and one bronze medal in World Championships, also as part of the 4 × 7.5 km relay team.

== Biathlon results ==
All results are sourced from the International Biathlon Union.

=== Olympic Games ===
1 medal (1 bronze)

Event	Individual	Relay
(Austria) 1976 Innsbruck	27th	Bronze

=== World Championships ===
3 medals (2 gold, 1 bronze)

Event	Individual	Sprint	Relay
(Soviet Union) 1974 Minsk	—	27th	4th
(Norway) 1977 Lillehammer	5th	15th	Bronze
(Austria) 1978 Hochfilzen	15th	—	Gold
(West Germany) 1979 Ruhpolding	14th	—	Gold

*During Olympic seasons competitions are only held for those events not included in the Olympic program.
