= Elena Belova (biathlete) =

Soviet and Russian biathlete

Medal record

Women's biathlon

Representing Russia

World Championships
Bronze medal – third place	1993 Borovets	7.5 km sprint
Bronze medal – third place	1993 Borovets	4 × 7.5 km relay

Representing CIS

World Championships
Silver medal – second place	1992 Novosibirsk	Team event

Representing Unified Team

Olympic Games
Bronze medal – third place	1992 Albertville	7.5 km sprint
Bronze medal – third place	1992 Albertville	4 × 7.5 km relay

Representing Soviet Union

World Championships
Gold medal – first place	1991 Lahti	Team event
Gold medal – first place	1991 Lahti	4 × 7.5 km relay

Elena Pavlovna Belova (Russian: Елена Павловна Белова); born 25 July 1965) is a former Russian biathlete who competed in the 1992 Winter Olympics.
