= Aleksandr Privalov =

Soviet biathlete (1933–2021)

Personal information
- Full name: Aleksandr Vasilyevich Privalov
- Born: 6 August 1933 Pyatnitsa, Solnechnogorsky District, Moscow Oblast, RSFSR, Soviet Union
- Died: 19 May 2021 (aged 87)
- Height: 1.83 m (6 ft 0 in)

Sport

Professional information
- Sport: Biathlon
- Club: Dynamo Moscow

Olympic Games
- Teams: 2 (1960, 1964)
- Medals: 2 (0 gold)

World Championships
- Teams: 5 (1959, 1961, 1962, 1965, 1966)
- Medals: 2 (0 gold)
Medal record
Men's biathlon
Representing Soviet Union
Olympic Games
Silver medal – second place	1964 Innsbruck	20 km individual
Bronze medal – third place	1960 Squaw Valley	20 km individual
World Championships
Silver medal – second place	1961 Umeå	20 km individual
Silver medal – second place	1961 Umeå	Team event

Aleksandr Vasilyevich Privalov (Russian: Александр Васильевич Привалов; 6 August 1933 – 19 May 2021) was a Soviet biathlete.

He received a bronze medal at the 1960 Winter Olympics in Squaw Valley. He received a silver medal at the 1964 Winter Olympics in Innsbruck.

== Biathlon results ==
All results are sourced from the International Biathlon Union.

=== Olympic Games ===
2 medals (1 silver, 1 bronze)

Event	Individual
(United States) 1960 Squaw Valley	Bronze
(Austria) 1964 Innsbruck	Silver

=== World Championships ===
2 medals (2 silver)

Event	Individual	Team (time)	Relay
(Italy) 1959 Courmayeur	11th	—	—N/a
(Sweden) 1961 Umeå	Silver	Silver	—N/a
(Finland) 1962 Hämeenlinna	12th	—	—N/a
(Norway) 1965 Elverum	16th	—	—N/a
(West Germany) 1966 Garmisch-Partenkirchen	11th	—N/a	—

*During Olympic seasons competitions are only held for those events not included in the Olympic program.
**The team (time) event was removed in 1965, whilst the relay was added in 1966.
