= Sigleif Johansen =

Norwegian biathlete (born 1948)

Medal record

Men's biathlon

Representing Norway

World Championships
Silver medal – second place	1977 Lillehammer	20 km individual
Silver medal – second place	1978 Hochfilzen	4 × 7.5 km relay
Bronze medal – third place	1979 Ruhpolding	20 km individual

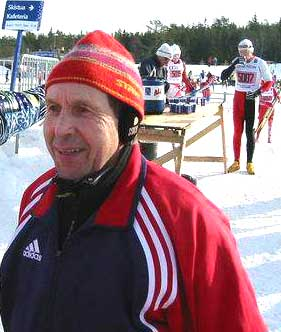

Sigleif Johansen (born 25 October 1948 in Tana) is a former Norwegian biathlete. He won a silver medal in the 20 km individual at the World Championships in 1977 in Lillehammer, and a bronze medal in Ruhpolding in 1979. He received a silver medal in the 4 × 7.5 km relay in 1978.
