= Stanisław Łukaszczyk =

Polish biathlete (born 1944)

Personal information
- Nationality: Polish
- Born: 13 July 1944 (age 80); Murzasichle, Poland

Sport
- Sport: Biathlon

Stanisław Łukaszczyk (born 13 July 1944) is a Polish biathlete. He competed in the 20 km individual event at the 1968 Winter Olympics.
