= Józef Gąsienica-Sobczak =

Polish skier (1934–2026)

Personal information
- Nationality: Polish
- Born: 9 July 1934 Kościelisko, Poland
- Died: 2 February 2026 (aged 91)

Sport
- Sport: Biathlon, cross-country skiing

Józef Gąsienica-Sobczak (9 July 1934 – 2 February 2026) was a Polish biathlete. He competed at the 1956, 1960, 1964 and the 1968 Winter Olympics.

Gąsienica-Sobczak died on 2 February 2026, at the age of 91.
