= Józef Stopka =

Polish biathlete (born 1942)

Personal information
- Nationality: Polish
- Born: 2 January 1942 (age 83); Dzianisz, Poland

Sport
- Sport: Biathlon

Józef Stopka (born 2 January 1942) is a Polish biathlete. He competed at the 1968 Winter Olympics and the 1972 Winter Olympics.
