= Biathlon World Championships 1962 =

Sports competition in Hämeenlinna, Finland

- Host city: Hämeenlinna
- Country: Finland
- Events: 2
- Opening: 4 March 1962
- Closing: 4 March 1962

The 4th Biathlon World Championships were held in 1962 in Hämeenlinna, Finland. The men's 20 km individual and team were the only competitions.

== Men's results ==
=== 20 km individual ===
Medal	Name	Nation	Penalties	Result	Behind
1st place, gold medalist(s)	Vladimir Melanin	URS	2	1:23:30	
2nd place, silver medalist(s)	Antti Tyrväinen	FIN	1	1:24:08	38
3rd place, bronze medalist(s)	Valentin Pshenitsyn	URS	1	1:24:17	47

Each shot missing the target gave a penalty of 2 minutes.

=== 20 km team ===
Medal	Name	Nation	Penalties	Result	Behind
1st place, gold medalist(s)	Soviet Union	URS	7	4:12:38	
2nd place, silver medalist(s)	Finland	FIN	4	4:20:45	8:07
3rd place, bronze medalist(s)	Norway	NOR	14	4:36:55	24:17

The times of the top 3 athletes from each nation in the individual race were added together.

== Medal table ==
Place	Nation	1st place, gold medalist(s)	2nd place, silver medalist(s)	3rd place, bronze medalist(s)	Total
1	Soviet Union	2	0	1	3
2	Finland	0	2	0	2
3	Norway	0	0	1	1
