= Biathlon at the 1964 Winter Olympics =

Biathlon at the IX Olympic Winter Games
- Venue: Seefeld
- Date: 4 February
- Competitors: 51 from 14 nations

Biathlon at the 1964 Winter Olympics consisted of one biathlon event, held at Seefeld. The event was held on 4 February.

== Medal summary ==
The Soviet Union won two medals in Innsbruck, taking gold and silver in the individual race.

=== Medal table ===
Rank	Nation	Gold	Silver	Bronze	Total
1	Soviet Union	1	1	0	2
2	Norway	0	0	1	1
Totals (2 entries)		1	1	1	3

=== Events ===
Event	Gold		Silver		Bronze	
Individual	Vladimir Melanin; Soviet Union	1:20:26.8	Aleksandr Privalov; Soviet Union	1:23:42.5	Olav Jordet; Norway	1:24:38.8

== Participating nations ==
Fourteen nations sent biathletes to compete in Innsbruck. Below is a list of the competing nations; in parentheses are the number of national competitors. Austria, Japan, Mongolia, Poland, Romania and Switzerland made their Olympic biathlon debut.

- Austria (4)
- Finland (4)
- France (1)
- Great Britain (4)
- United Team of Germany (4)
- Japan (2)
- Mongolia (4)
- Norway (4)
- Poland (4)
- Romania (4)
- Switzerland (4)
- Sweden (4)
- Soviet Union (4)
- United States (4)
