= Stanisław Szczepaniak =

Polish biathlete (1934–2015)

Personal information
- Nationality: Polish
- Born: 17 August 1934; Kościelisko, Poland
- Died: 21 June 2015 (aged 80); Kościelisko, Poland

Sport
- Sport: Biathlon

Stanisław Szczepaniak (17 August 1934 – 21 June 2015) was a Polish biathlete. He competed at the 1964 Winter Olympics and the 1968 Winter Olympics.
