= Józef Rubiś =

Polish skier (1931–2010)

Personal information
- Nationality: Polish
- Born: 19 March 1931; Zakopane, Poland
- Died: 28 September 2010 (aged 79); Zakopane, Poland

Sport
- Sport: Biathlon, cross-country skiing

Józef Rubiś (19 March 1931 – 28 September 2010) was a Polish skier. He competed at the 1956 Winter Olympics and the 1964 Winter Olympics. Rubiś died on 28 September 2010, at the age of 79.
