= Heinrich Mehringer =

German biathlete

Personal information
- Nationality: German
- Born: 23 February 1952 (age 73); Tegernsee, West Germany

Sport
- Sport: Biathlon

Heinrich Mehringer (born 23 February 1952) is a German biathlete. He competed in the 20 km individual event at the 1976 Winter Olympics.
