= Hannu Posti =

Finnish long-distance runner and biathlete

Hannu Kalevi Posti (15 January 1926 in Vehkalahti – 13 June 2012 in Helsinki) was a Finnish male long-distance runner and biathlete who competed in the 1952 Summer Olympics and in the 1964 Winter Olympics.
