= Valentin Pshenitsyn =

Soviet biathlete (1936–2007)

Personal information
- Nationality: Soviet
- Born: 3 November 1936; Dmitrov, Russian SFSR, Soviet Union
- Died: 2007 (aged 70–71)

Sport
- Sport: Biathlon

Valentin Pshenitsyn (3 November 1936 – 2007) was a Soviet biathlete. He competed in the 20 km individual event at the 1960 Winter Olympics and the 1964 Winter Olympics.
