= Raimo Seppänen =

Finnish biathlete

Personal information
- Nationality: Finnish
- Born: 21 October 1950 (age 74); Suomussalmi, Finland

Sport
- Sport: Biathlon

Raimo Seppänen (born 21 October 1950) is a Finnish biathlete. He competed in the 20 km individual event at the 1980 Winter Olympics.
