= Biathlon World Championships 1958 =

1st edition of the Biathlon World Championships

- Host city: Saalfelden
- Country: Austria
- Events: 2
- Opening: 1 March 1958
- Closing: 2 March 1958

The 1st Biathlon World Championships were held in 1958 in Saalfelden, Austria. The men's 20 km individual and team were the only competitions.

== Men's results ==
=== 20 km individual ===
| Medal | Name | Nation | Penalties | Result | Behind |
|---|---|---|---|---|---|
| 1st place, gold medalist(s) | Adolf Wiklund | SWE | 3 | 1:33:44 | |
| 2nd place, silver medalist(s) | Olle Gunneriusson | SWE | 3 | 1:34:13 | 29 |
| 3rd place, bronze medalist(s) | Viktor Butakov | URS | 6 | 1:34:46 | 1:02 |

Each shot missing the target gave a penalty of 2 minutes.

=== 20 km team ===
| Medal | Name | Nation | Penalties | Result | Behind |
|---|---|---|---|---|---|
| 1st place, gold medalist(s) | Sweden | SWE | | 6:23:58 | |
| 2nd place, silver medalist(s) | Soviet Union | URS | | 6:35:33 | 11:35 |
| 3rd place, bronze medalist(s) | Norway | NOR | | 7:23:58 | 1:00:00 |

The times of the top 4 athletes from each nation in the individual race were added together.

== Medal table ==
| Place | Nation | 1st place, gold medalist(s) | 2nd place, silver medalist(s) | 3rd place, bronze medalist(s) | Total |
|---|---|---|---|---|---|
| 1 | Sweden | 2 | 1 | 0 | 3 |
| 2 | Soviet Union | 0 | 1 | 1 | 2 |
| 3 | Norway | 0 | 0 | 1 | 1 |
