= Biathlon World Championships 1959 =

1959 edition of the Biathlon World Championships

- Host city: Courmayeur
- Country: Italy
- Events: 2

The 2nd Biathlon World Championships were held in 1959 in Courmayeur, Italy. The men's 20 km individual and team were the only competitions.

== Men's results ==
=== 20 km individual ===
| Medal | Name | Nation | Penalties | Result | Behind |
|---|---|---|---|---|---|
| 1st place, gold medalist(s) | Vladimir Melanin | URS | 5 | 1:41:05 | |
| 2nd place, silver medalist(s) | Dmitri Sokolov | URS | 4 | 1:41:15 | 10 |
| 3rd place, bronze medalist(s) | Sven Agge | SWE | 3 | 1:43:23 | 2:18 |

Each shot missing the target gave a penalty of 2 minutes.

=== 20 km team ===
| Medal | Name | Nation | Penalties | Result | Behind |
|---|---|---|---|---|---|
| 1st place, gold medalist(s) | Soviet Union | URS | | 5:10:27 | |
| 2nd place, silver medalist(s) | Sweden | SWE | | 5:26:11 | 15:44 |
| 3rd place, bronze medalist(s) | Norway | NOR | | 5:33:47 | 23:20 |

The times of the top 3 athletes from each nation in the individual race were added together.

== Medal table ==
| Place | Nation | 1st place, gold medalist(s) | 2nd place, silver medalist(s) | 3rd place, bronze medalist(s) | Total |
|---|---|---|---|---|---|
| 1 | Soviet Union | 2 | 1 | 0 | 3 |
| 2 | Sweden | 0 | 1 | 1 | 2 |
| 3 | Norway | 0 | 0 | 1 | 1 |
