= Biathlon at the 1960 Winter Olympics =

Biathlon at the VIII Olympic Winter Games
- Venue: McKinney Creek Stadium
- Dates: 21 February
- Competitors: 30 from 9 nations

Biathlon at the 1960 Winter Olympics consisted of one biathlon event, held at McKinney Creek Stadium, Tahoma, California. The event occurred on 21 February 1960. This was the first appearance of modern biathlon in the Olympic Games. In 1924, a military patrol event was held. Some sources do not include this military patrol race as an Olympic event, but the IOC considers it an event within biathlon.

== Medal summary ==
Klas Lestander of Sweden won the first modern biathlon Olympic gold medal.

=== Medal table ===
Rank	Nation	Gold	Silver	Bronze	Total
1	Sweden	1	0	0	1
2	Finland	0	1	0	1
3	Soviet Union	0	0	1	1
Totals (3 entries)		1	1	1	3

=== Events ===
Event	Gold		Silver		Bronze	
Individual	Klas Lestander; Sweden	1:33:21.6	Antti Tyrvainen; Finland	1:33:57.7	Aleksandr Privalov; Soviet Union	1:34:54.2

== Participating nations ==
Nine nations sent biathletes to compete in Squaw Valley. Below is a list of the competing nations; in parentheses are the number of national competitors.

- Finland (4)
- France (4)
- United Team of Germany (4)
- Great Britain (2)
- Hungary (1)
- Norway (3)
- Soviet Union (4)
- Sweden (4)
- United States (4)
