= Biathlon World Championships 1961 =

Sports competition in Umeå, Sweden

- Host city: Umeå
- Country: Sweden
- Events: 2
- Opening: 25 February 1961
- Closing: 25 February 1961

The 3rd Biathlon World Championships were held in 1961 in Umeå, Sweden. The men's 20 km individual and team were the only competitions.

== Men's results ==
=== 20 km individual ===
Medal	Name	Nation	Penalties	Result	Behind
1st place, gold medalist(s)	Kalevi Huuskonen	FIN	1	1:32:11	
2nd place, silver medalist(s)	Aleksandr Privalov	URS	3	1:35:07	2:56
3rd place, bronze medalist(s)	Paavo Repo	FIN	4	1:35:20	3:09

Each shot missing the target gave a penalty of 2 minutes.

=== 20 km team ===
Medal	Name	Nation	Penalties	Result	Behind
1st place, gold medalist(s)	Finland	FIN	11	4:45:38	
2nd place, silver medalist(s)	Soviet Union	URS	11	4:51:35	5:57
3rd place, bronze medalist(s)	Sweden	SWE	12	5:06:11	20:33

The times of the top 3 athletes from each nation in the individual race were added together.

== Medal table ==
Place	Nation	1st place, gold medalist(s)	2nd place, silver medalist(s)	3rd place, bronze medalist(s)	Total
1	Finland	2	0	1	3
2	Soviet Union	0	2	0	2
3	Sweden	0	0	1	1
