= List of Olympic medalists in biathlon =

This is the complete list of Olympic medalists in biathlon.

Medalists in military patrol, a precursor to biathlon, are listed separately.

== Men ==
The numbers in brackets denotes biathletes who won gold medal in corresponding disciplines more than one time. Bold numbers denotes record number of victories in certain disciplines.

=== Individual (20 km) ===
Games	Gold	Silver	Bronze
1960 Squaw Valley	Klas Lestander; Sweden	Antti Tyrväinen; Finland	Aleksandr Privalov; Soviet Union
1964 Innsbruck	Vladimir Melanin; Soviet Union	Aleksandr Privalov; Soviet Union	Olav Jordet; Norway
1968 Grenoble	Magnar Solberg; Norway	Alexander Tikhonov; Soviet Union	Vladimir Gundartsev; Soviet Union
1972 Sapporo	Magnar Solberg; Norway	Hansjörg Knauthe; East Germany	Lars-Göran Arwidson; Sweden
1976 Innsbruck	Nikolay Kruglov; Soviet Union	Heikki Ikola; Finland	Aleksandr Elizarov; Soviet Union
1980 Lake Placid	Anatoly Alyabyev; Soviet Union	Frank Ullrich; East Germany	Eberhard Rösch; East Germany
1984 Sarajevo	Peter Angerer; West Germany	Frank-Peter Roetsch; East Germany	Eirik Kvalfoss; Norway
1988 Calgary	Frank-Peter Roetsch; East Germany	Valeriy Medvedtsev; Soviet Union	Johann Passler; Italy
1992 Albertville	Evgeny Redkin; Unified Team	Mark Kirchner; Germany	Mikael Löfgren; Sweden
1994 Lillehammer	Sergei Tarasov; Russia	Frank Luck; Germany	Sven Fischer; Germany
1998 Nagano	Halvard Hanevold; Norway	Pieralberto Carrara; Italy	Alexei Aidarov; Belarus
2002 Salt Lake City	Ole Einar Bjørndalen; Norway	Frank Luck; Germany	Viktor Maigourov; Russia
2006 Turin	Michael Greis; Germany	Ole Einar Bjørndalen; Norway	Halvard Hanevold; Norway
2010 Vancouver	Emil Hegle Svendsen; Norway	Ole Einar Bjørndalen; Norway; Sergey Novikov; Belarus	None awarded
2014 Sochi	Martin Fourcade; France	Erik Lesser; Germany	Evgeniy Garanichev; Russia
2018 Pyeongchang	Johannes Thingnes Bø; Norway	Jakov Fak; Slovenia	Dominik Landertinger; Austria
2022 Beijing	Quentin Fillon Maillet; France	Anton Smolski; Belarus	Johannes Thingnes Bø; Norway
2026 Milano Cortina	Johan-Olav Botn; Norway	Éric Perrot; France	Sturla Holm Lægreid; Norway

Medals
Rank	Nation	Gold	Silver	Bronze	Total
1	Norway	**7**	2	**5**	**14**
2	Soviet Union	3	3	3	9
3	France	2	1	0	3
4	Germany	1	**4**	1	6
5	East Germany	1	3	1	5
6	Russia	1	0	2	3
6	Sweden	1	0	2	3
8	Unified Team	1	0	0	1
8	West Germany	1	0	0	1
10	Belarus	0	2	1	3
11	Finland	0	2	0	2
12	Italy	0	1	1	2
13	Slovenia	0	1	0	1
14	Austria	0	0	1	1
Total	**14 nations**	**18**	**19**	**17**	**54**

=== Sprint (10 km) ===
Games	Gold	Silver	Bronze
1980 Lake Placid	Frank Ullrich; East Germany	Vladimir Alikin; Soviet Union	Anatoly Alyabyev; Soviet Union
1984 Sarajevo	Eirik Kvalfoss; Norway	Peter Angerer; West Germany	Matthias Jacob; East Germany
1988 Calgary	Frank-Peter Roetsch; East Germany	Valeriy Medvedtsev; Soviet Union	Sergei Tchepikov; Soviet Union
1992 Albertville	Mark Kirchner; Germany	Ricco Groß; Germany	Harri Eloranta; Finland
1994 Lillehammer	Sergei Tchepikov; Russia	Ricco Groß; Germany	Sergei Tarasov; Russia
1998 Nagano	Ole Einar Bjørndalen; Norway	Frode Andresen; Norway	Ville Räikkönen; Finland
2002 Salt Lake City	Ole Einar Bjørndalen; Norway	Sven Fischer; Germany	Wolfgang Perner; Austria
2006 Turin	Sven Fischer; Germany	Halvard Hanevold; Norway	Frode Andresen; Norway
2010 Vancouver	Vincent Jay; France	Emil Hegle Svendsen; Norway	Jakov Fak; Croatia
2014 Sochi	Ole Einar Bjørndalen; Norway	Dominik Landertinger; Austria	Jaroslav Soukup; Czech Republic
2018 Pyeongchang	Arnd Peiffer; Germany	Michal Krčmář; Czech Republic	Dominik Windisch; Italy
2022 Beijing	Johannes Thingnes Bø; Norway	Quentin Fillon Maillet; France	Tarjei Bø; Norway
2026 Milano Cortina	Quentin Fillon Maillet; France	Vetle Sjåstad Christiansen; Norway	Sturla Holm Lægreid; Norway

Medals
Rank	Nation	Gold	Silver	Bronze	Total
1	Norway	**5**	**4**	**3**	**12**
2	Germany	3	3	0	6
3	France	2	1	0	3
4	East Germany	2	0	1	3
5	Russia	1	0	1	2
6	Soviet Union	0	2	2	4
6	Austria	0	1	1	2
8	Czech Republic	0	1	1	2
8	West Germany	0	1	0	1
10	Finland	0	0	2	2
11	Croatia	0	0	1	1
12	Italy	0	0	1	1
Total	**12 nations**	**13**	**13**	**13**	**39**

=== Pursuit (12.5 km) ===
Games	Gold	Silver	Bronze
2002 Salt Lake City	Ole Einar Bjørndalen; Norway	Raphaël Poirée; France	Ricco Groß; Germany
2006 Turin	Vincent Defrasne; France	Ole Einar Bjørndalen; Norway	Sven Fischer; Germany
2010 Vancouver	Björn Ferry; Sweden	Christoph Sumann; Austria	Vincent Jay; France
2014 Sochi	Martin Fourcade; France	Ondřej Moravec; Czech Republic	Jean-Guillaume Béatrix; France
2018 Pyeongchang	Martin Fourcade **(2)**; France	Sebastian Samuelsson; Sweden	Benedikt Doll; Germany
2022 Beijing	Quentin Fillon Maillet; France	Tarjei Bø; Norway	Eduard Latypov; ROC
2026 Milano Cortina	Martin Ponsiluoma; Sweden	Sturla Holm Lægreid; Norway	Émilien Jacquelin; France

==== Medals ====
Rank	Nation	Gold	Silver	Bronze	Total
1	France	**4**	1	**3**	**8**
2	Sweden	2	1	0	3
3	Norway	1	**3**	0	4
4	Austria	0	1	0	1
4	Czech Republic	0	1	0	1
6	Germany	0	0	**3**	3
7	ROC	0	0	1	1
Total		7	7	7	21

=== Mass start (15 km) ===
Games	Gold	Silver	Bronze
2006 Turin	Michael Greis; Germany	Tomasz Sikora; Poland	Ole Einar Bjørndalen; Norway
2010 Vancouver	Martin Fourcade; France	Pavol Hurajt; Slovakia	Christoph Sumann; Austria
2014 Sochi	Emil Hegle Svendsen; Norway	Martin Fourcade; France	Ondřej Moravec; Czech Republic
2018 Pyeongchang	Martin Fourcade; France	Simon Schempp; Germany	Emil Hegle Svendsen; Norway
2022 Beijing	Johannes Thingnes Bø; Norway	Martin Ponsiluoma; Sweden	Vetle Sjåstad Christiansen; Norway
2026 Milano Cortina	Johannes Dale-Skjevdal; Norway	Sturla Holm Lægreid; Norway	Quentin Fillon Maillet; France

==== Medals ====
Rank	Nation	Gold	Silver	Bronze	Total
1	Norway	**3**	0	**3**	**6**
2	France	**2**	1	1	4
3	Germany	1	1	0	2
4	Poland	0	1	0	1
4	Slovakia	0	1	0	1
4	Sweden	0	1	0	1
7	Czech Republic	0	0	1	1
7	Austria	0	0	1	1
Total		5	5	5	15

=== Relay (4×7.5 km) ===
Games	Gold	Silver	Bronze
1968 Grenoble	Soviet Union Alexander Tikhonov; Nikolay Puzanov; Viktor Mamatov; Vladimir Gundartsev	Norway Ola Wærhaug; Olav Jordet; Magnar Solberg; Jon Istad	Sweden Lars-Göran Arwidson; Tore Eriksson; Olle Petrusson; Holmfrid Olsson
1972 Sapporo	Soviet Union Alexander Tikhonov (2); Rinnat Safin; Ivan Biakov; Viktor Mamatov (2)	Finland Esko Saira; Juhani Suutarinen; Heikki Ikola; Mauri Röppänen	East Germany Hansjörg Knauthe; Joachim Meischner; Dieter Speer; Horst Koschka
1976 Innsbruck	Soviet Union Alexander Tikhonov (3); Aleksandr Elizarov; Ivan Biakov (2); Nikolay Kruglov	Finland Henrik Flöjt; Esko Saira; Juhani Suutarinen; Heikki Ikola	East Germany Karl-Heinz Menz; Frank Ullrich; Manfred Beer; Manfred Geyer
1980 Lake Placid	Soviet Union Alexander Tikhonov **(4)**; Vladimir Alikin; Vladimir Barnashov; Anatoly Alyabyev	East Germany Mathias Jung; Klaus Siebert; Frank Ullrich; Eberhard Rösch	West Germany Franz Bernreiter; Hans Estner; Peter Angerer; Gerhard Winkler
1984 Sarajevo	Soviet Union Dmitry Vasilyev; Juri Kashkarov; Algimantas Šalna; Sergei Bulygin	Norway Odd Lirhus; Eirik Kvalfoss; Rolf Storsveen; Kjell Søbak	West Germany Ernst Reiter; Walter Pichler; Peter Angerer; Fritz Fischer
1988 Calgary	Soviet Union Dmitry Vasilyev (2); Sergei Tchepikov; Alexandr Popov; Valeriy Medvedtsev	West Germany Ernst Reiter; Stefan Höck; Peter Angerer; Fritz Fischer	Italy Werner Kiem; Gottlieb Taschler; Johann Passler; Andreas Zingerle
1992 Albertville	Germany Ricco Groß; Jens Steinigen; Mark Kirchner; Fritz Fischer	Unified Team Valeriy Medvedtsev; Alexandr Popov; Valeri Kiriyenko; Sergei Tchepikov	Sweden Ulf Johansson; Leif Andersson; Tord Wiksten; Mikael Löfgren
1994 Lillehammer	Germany Ricco Groß (2); Frank Luck; Mark Kirchner (2); Sven Fischer	Russia Valeri Kiriyenko; Vladimir Drachev; Sergei Tarasov; Sergei Tchepikov	France Thierry Dusserre; Patrice Bailly-Salins; Lionel Laurent; Hervé Flandin
1998 Nagano	Germany Ricco Groß (3); Peter Sendel; Sven Fischer (2); Frank Luck (2)	Norway Egil Gjelland; Halvard Hanevold; Dag Bjørndalen; Ole Einar Bjørndalen	Russia Pavel Muslimov; Vladimir Drachev; Sergei Tarasov; Viktor Maigourov
2002 Salt Lake City	Norway Halvard Hanevold; Frode Andresen; Egil Gjelland; Ole Einar Bjørndalen	Germany Ricco Groß; Peter Sendel; Sven Fischer; Frank Luck	France Gilles Marguet; Vincent Defrasne; Julien Robert; Raphaël Poirée
2006 Turin	Germany Ricco Groß **(4)**; Michael Rösch; Sven Fischer (3); Michael Greis	Russia Ivan Tcherezov; Sergei Tchepikov; Pavel Rostovtsev; Nikolay Kruglov, Jr.	France Julien Robert; Vincent Defrasne; Ferréol Cannard; Raphaël Poirée
2010 Vancouver	Norway Halvard Hanevold (2); Tarjei Bø; Emil Hegle Svendsen; Ole Einar Bjørndalen (2)	Austria Simon Eder; Daniel Mesotitsch; Dominik Landertinger; Christoph Sumann	Sweden Fredrik Lindström; Carl Johan Bergman; Mattias Nilsson; Björn Ferry
2014 Sochi	Germany Erik Lesser; Daniel Böhm; Arnd Peiffer; Simon Schempp	Austria Christoph Sumann; Daniel Mesotitsch; Simon Eder; Dominik Landertinger	Norway Tarjei Bø; Johannes Thingnes Bø; Ole Einar Bjørndalen; Emil Hegle Svendsen
2018 Pyeongchang	Sweden Peppe Femling; Jesper Nelin; Sebastian Samuelsson; Fredrik Lindström	Norway Lars Helge Birkeland; Tarjei Bø; Johannes Thingnes Bø; Emil Hegle Svendsen	Germany Erik Lesser; Benedikt Doll; Arnd Peiffer; Simon Schempp
2022 Beijing	Norway Sturla Holm Lægreid; Tarjei Bø (2); Johannes Thingnes Bø; Vetle Sjåstad Christiansen	France Fabien Claude; Émilien Jacquelin; Simon Desthieux; Quentin Fillon Maillet	ROC Said Karimulla Khalili; Alexander Loginov; Maxim Tsvetkov; Eduard Latypov
2026 Milano Cortina	France Fabien Claude; Émilien Jacquelin; Quentin Fillon Maillet; Éric Perrot	Norway Martin Uldal; Johan-Olav Botn; Sturla Holm Lægreid; Vetle Sjåstad Christiansen	Sweden Viktor Brandt; Jesper Nelin; Martin Ponsiluoma; Sebastian Samuelsson

==== Medals ====
Rank	Nation	Gold	Silver	Bronze	Total
1	Soviet Union	**6**	0	0	6
2	Germany	5	1	1	7
3	Norway	3	**5**	1	**8**
4	France	1	1	3	4
5	Sweden	1	0	**4**	4
6	Finland	0	2	0	2
7	Russia	0	2	1	3
8	Austria	0	2	0	2
9	East Germany	0	1	2	3
9	West Germany	0	1	2	3
11	Unified Team	0	1	0	1
12	Italy	0	0	1	1
12	ROC	0	0	1	1
Total		16	16	16	48

== Women ==
The numbers in brackets denotes biathletes who won gold medal in corresponding disciplines more than one time. Bold numbers denotes record number of victories in certain disciplines.

=== Individual (15 km) ===
Games	Gold	Silver	Bronze
1992 Albertville	Antje Misersky; Germany	Svetlana Petcherskaia; Unified Team	Myriam Bédard; Canada
1994 Lillehammer	Myriam Bédard; Canada	Anne Briand; France	Uschi Disl; Germany
1998 Nagano	Ekaterina Dafovska; Bulgaria	Olena Petrova; Ukraine	Uschi Disl; Germany
2002 Salt Lake City	Andrea Henkel; Germany	Liv Grete Skjelbreid Poirée; Norway	Magdalena Forsberg; Sweden
2006 Turin	Svetlana Ishmouratova; Russia	Martina Glagow; Germany	Albina Akhatova; Russia
2010 Vancouver	Tora Berger; Norway	Elena Khrustaleva; Kazakhstan	Darya Domracheva; Belarus
2014 Sochi	Darya Domracheva; Belarus	Selina Gasparin; Switzerland	Nadezhda Skardino; Belarus
2018 Pyeongchang	Hanna Öberg; Sweden	Anastasiya Kuzmina; Slovakia	Laura Dahlmeier; Germany
2022 Beijing	Denise Herrmann; Germany	Anaïs Chevalier-Bouchet; France	Marte Olsbu Røiseland; Norway
2026 Milano Cortina	Julia Simon; France	Lou Jeanmonnot; France	Lora Hristova; Bulgaria

Medals
Rank	Nation	Gold	Silver	Bronze	Total
1	Germany	**3**	1	**3**	**7**
2	France	1	**3**	0	4
3	Norway	1	1	1	3
4	Belarus	1	0	2	3
5	Sweden	1	0	1	1
5	Bulgaria	1	0	1	1
5	Canada	1	0	1	1
5	Russia	1	0	1	1
9	Kazakhstan	0	1	0	1
9	Slovakia	0	1	0	1
9	Switzerland	0	1	0	1
9	Ukraine	0	1	0	1
9	Unified Team	0	1	0	1
Total	**13 nations**	**10**	**10**	**10**	**30**

=== Sprint (7.5 km) ===
Games	Gold	Silver	Bronze
1992 Albertville	Anfisa Reztsova; Unified Team	Antje Misersky; Germany	Yelena Belova; Unified Team
1994 Lillehammer	Myriam Bédard; Canada	Svetlana Paramygina; Belarus	Valentina Tserbe; Ukraine
1998 Nagano	Galina Kukleva; Russia	Uschi Disl; Germany	Katrin Apel; Germany
2002 Salt Lake City	Kati Wilhelm; Germany	Uschi Disl; Germany	Magdalena Forsberg; Sweden
2006 Turin	Florence Baverel-Robert; France	Anna Carin Olofsson; Sweden	Lilia Vaygina-Efremova; Ukraine
2010 Vancouver	Anastasiya Kuzmina; Slovakia	Magdalena Neuner; Germany	Marie Dorin; France
2014 Sochi	Anastasiya Kuzmina; Slovakia	Olga Vilukhina; Russia	Vita Semerenko; Ukraine
2018 Pyeongchang	Laura Dahlmeier; Germany	Marte Olsbu; Norway	Veronika Vítková; Czech Republic
2022 Beijing	Marte Olsbu Røiseland; Norway	Elvira Öberg; Sweden	Dorothea Wierer; Italy
2026 Milan Cortina	Maren Kirkeeide; Norway	Océane Michelon; France	Lou Jeanmonnot; France

Medals
Rank	Nation	Gold	Silver	Bronze	Total
1	Germany	**2**	**4**	1	**7**
2	Norway	**2**	1	0	3
3	Slovakia	**2**	0	0	2
4	France	1	1	2	4
5	Russia	1	1	0	2
6	Unified Team	1	0	1	2
7	Canada	1	0	0	1
8	Sweden	0	2	1	3
9	Belarus	0	1	0	1
10	Ukraine	0	0	**3**	3
11	Czech Republic	0	0	1	1
11	Italy	0	0	1	1
Total	**12 nations**	**10**	**10**	**10**	**30**

=== Pursuit (10 km) ===
Games	Gold	Silver	Bronze
2002 Salt Lake City	Olga Pyleva; Russia	Kati Wilhelm; Germany	Irina Nikulchina; Bulgaria
2006 Turin	Kati Wilhelm; Germany	Martina Glagow; Germany	Albina Akhatova; Russia
2010 Vancouver	Magdalena Neuner; Germany	Anastasiya Kuzmina; Slovakia	Marie-Laure Brunet; France
2014 Sochi	Darya Domracheva; Belarus	Tora Berger; Norway	Teja Gregorin; Slovenia
2018 Pyeongchang	Laura Dahlmeier; Germany	Anastasiya Kuzmina; Slovakia	Anaïs Bescond; France
2022 Beijing	Marte Olsbu Røiseland; Norway	Elvira Öberg; Sweden	Tiril Eckhoff; Norway
2026 Milano Cortina	Lisa Vittozzi; Italy	Maren Kirkeeide; Norway	Suvi Minkkinen; Finland

==== Medals ====
Rank	Nation	Gold	Silver	Bronze	Total
1	Germany	**3**	**2**	0	**5**
2	Norway	1	**2**	1	4
3	Russia	1	0	1	2
4	Belarus	1	0	0	1
4	Italy	1	0	0	1
6	Slovakia	0	**2**	0	2
7	Sweden	0	1	0	1
8	France	0	0	**2**	2
9	Bulgaria	0	0	1	1
9	Finland	0	0	1	1
9	Slovenia	0	0	1	1
Total		7	7	7	21

=== Mass start (12.5 km) ===
Games	Gold	Silver	Bronze
2006 Turin	Anna Carin Olofsson; Sweden	Kati Wilhelm; Germany	Uschi Disl; Germany
2010 Vancouver	Magdalena Neuner; Germany	Olga Zaitseva; Russia	Simone Hauswald; Germany
2014 Sochi	Darya Domracheva; Belarus	Gabriela Soukalová; Czech Republic	Tiril Eckhoff; Norway
2018 Pyeongchang	Anastasiya Kuzmina; Slovakia	Darya Domracheva; Belarus	Tiril Eckhoff; Norway
2022 Beijing	Justine Braisaz-Bouchet; France	Tiril Eckhoff; Norway	Marte Olsbu Røiseland; Norway
2026 Milan Cortina	Océane Michelon; France	Julia Simon; France	Tereza Voborníková; Czech Republic

==== Medals ====
Rank	Nation	Gold	Silver	Bronze	Total
1	France	**2**	1	0	3
2	Germany	1	1	2	**4**
3	Belarus	1	1	0	2
4	Slovakia	1	0	0	1
4	Sweden	1	0	0	1
6	Norway	0	1	**3**	**4**
7	Czech Republic	0	1	1	2
8	Russia	0	1	0	1
Total		6	6	6	18

=== Relay (4×6 km) ===
The women's relay event has been competed over three different distances:

- 3×7.5 km — 1992
- 4×7.5 km — 1994–2002
- 4×6 km — 2006–2026

Games	Gold	Silver	Bronze
1992 Albertville	France Corinne Niogret; Véronique Claudel; Anne Briand	Germany Uschi Disl; Antje Misersky; Petra Schaaf	Unified Team Yelena Belova; Anfisa Reztsova; Yelena Melnikova
1994 Lillehammer	Russia Nadezhda Talanova; Natalya Snytina; Luiza Noskova; Anfisa Reztsova	Germany Uschi Disl; Antje Harvey; Simone Greiner-Petter-Memm; Petra Schaaf	France Corinne Niogret; Véronique Claudel; Delphyne Heymann; Anne Briand
1998 Nagano	Germany Katrin Apel; Uschi Disl; Martina Zellner; Petra Behle	Russia Albina Akhatova; Olga Melnik; Galina Kukleva; Olga Romasko	Norway Ann-Elen Skjelbreid; Annette Sikveland; Gunn Margit Andreassen; Liv Grete Skjelbreid
2002 Salt Lake City	Germany Katrin Apel **(2)**; Uschi Disl **(2)**; Andrea Henkel; Kati Wilhelm	Norway Ann-Elen Skjelbreid; Linda Tjørhom; Gunn Margit Andreassen; Liv Grete Skjelbreid Poirée	Russia Albina Akhatova; Olga Pyleva; Galina Kukleva; Svetlana Ishmouratova
2006 Turin	Russia Anna Bogaliy-Titovets; Svetlana Ishmouratova; Olga Zaitseva; Albina Akhatova	Germany Martina Glagow; Andrea Henkel; Katrin Apel; Kati Wilhelm	France Delphyne Peretto; Florence Baverel-Robert; Sylvie Becaert; Sandrine Bailly
2010 Vancouver	Russia Anna Bogaliy-Titovets **(2)**; Svetlana Sleptsova; Olga Medvedtseva; Olga Zaitseva **(2)**	France Marie-Laure Brunet; Marie Dorin; Sylvie Becaert; Sandrine Bailly	Germany Kati Wilhelm; Simone Hauswald; Martina Beck; Andrea Henkel
2014 Sochi	Ukraine Vita Semerenko; Yuliia Dzhima; Valentyna Semerenko; Olena Pidhrushna	Norway Fanny Welle-Strand Horn; Tiril Eckhoff; Ann Kristin Flatland; Tora Berger	Czech Republic Eva Puskarčíková; Gabriela Soukalová; Jitka Landová; Veronika Vítková
2018 Pyeongchang	Belarus Nadezhda Skardino; Iryna Kryuko; Dzinara Alimbekava; Darya Domracheva	Sweden Linn Persson; Mona Brorsson; Anna Magnusson; Hanna Öberg	France Anaïs Chevalier; Marie Dorin Habert; Justine Braisaz; Anaïs Bescond
2022 Beijing	Sweden Linn Persson; Mona Brorsson; Hanna Öberg; Elvira Öberg	ROC Irina Kazakevich; Kristina Reztsova; Svetlana Mironova; Uliana Nigmatullina	Germany Vanessa Voigt; Vanessa Hinz; Franziska Preuß; Denise Herrmann
2026 Milano Cortina	France Camille Bened; Lou Jeanmonnot; Océane Michelon; Julia Simon	Sweden Linn Gestblom; Anna Magnusson; Elvira Öberg; Hanna Öberg	Norway Marthe Kråkstad Johansen; Juni Arnekleiv; Karoline Offigstad Knotten; Maren Kirkeeide

==== Medals ====
Rank	Nation	Gold	Silver	Bronze	Total
1	Russia	**3**	1	1	5
2	Germany	2	**3**	2	**7**
3	France	2	1	**3**	6
4	Sweden	1	2	0	3
5	Belarus	1	0	0	1
5	Ukraine	1	0	0	1
7	Norway	0	2	2	4
8	ROC	0	1	0	1
9	Czech Republic	0	0	1	1
9	Unified Team	0	0	1	1
Total		10	10	10	30

== Mixed ==
=== Relay ===
Games	Gold	Silver	Bronze
2 × 6 km + 2 × 7.5 km
2014 Sochi	Norway Tora Berger; Tiril Eckhoff; Ole Einar Bjørndalen; Emil Hegle Svendsen	Czech Republic Veronika Vítková; Gabriela Soukalová; Jaroslav Soukup; Ondřej Moravec	Italy Dorothea Wierer; Karin Oberhofer; Dominik Windisch; Lukas Hofer
2018 Pyeongchang	France Marie Dorin Habert; Anaïs Bescond; Simon Desthieux; Martin Fourcade	Norway Marte Olsbu; Tiril Eckhoff; Johannes Thingnes Bø; Emil Hegle Svendsen	Italy Lisa Vittozzi; Dorothea Wierer; Lukas Hofer; Dominik Windisch
4 × 6 km
2022 Beijing	Norway Marte Olsbu Røiseland; Tiril Eckhoff; Tarjei Bø; Johannes Thingnes Bø	France Anaïs Chevalier-Bouchet; Julia Simon; Émilien Jacquelin; Quentin Fillon Maillet	ROC Uliana Nigmatullina; Kristina Reztsova; Alexander Loginov; Eduard Latypov
2026 Milano Cortina	France Éric Perrot; Quentin Fillon Maillet; Lou Jeanmonnot; Julia Simon	Italy Tommaso Giacomel; Lukas Hofer; Dorothea Wierer; Lisa Vittozzi	Germany Justus Strelow; Philipp Nawrath; Vanessa Voigt; Franziska Preuß

Medals
Rank	Nation	Gold	Silver	Bronze	Total
1	France	2	1	0	3
1	Norway	2	1	0	3
3	Italy	0	1	2	3
4	Czech Republic	0	1	0	1
5	Germany	0	0	1	1
5	ROC	0	0	1	1
Total	6 nations	4	4	4	12

== Statistics ==
=== Medal table ===
Rank	Nation	Gold	Silver	Bronze	Total
1	Norway	25	23	19	67
2	Germany	21	20	14	55
3	France	19	12	14	45
4	Russia	10	5	8	23
5	Soviet Union	9	5	5	19
6	Sweden	7	7	7	21
7	Belarus	4	4	3	11
8	East Germany	3	4	4	11
9	Slovakia	3	3	1	7
10	Unified Team	2	2	2	6
11	Canada	2	0	1	3
12	Italy	1	2	6	9
13	West Germany	1	2	2	5
14	Ukraine	1	1	3	5
15	Bulgaria	1	0	2	3
16	Czech Republic	0	4	4	8
17	Finland	0	4	3	7
18	Austria	0	3	3	6
19	ROC	0	1	3	4
20	Slovenia	0	1	1	2
21	Kazakhstan	0	1	0	1
21	Poland	0	1	0	1
21	Switzerland	0	1	0	1
24	Croatia	0	0	1	1
Totals (24 entries)		**109**	**106**	**106**	**321**

Note

- This table does not include medals of 1924 military patrol event, that the IOC now treats as a separate discipline.

=== Biathlete medal leaders ===
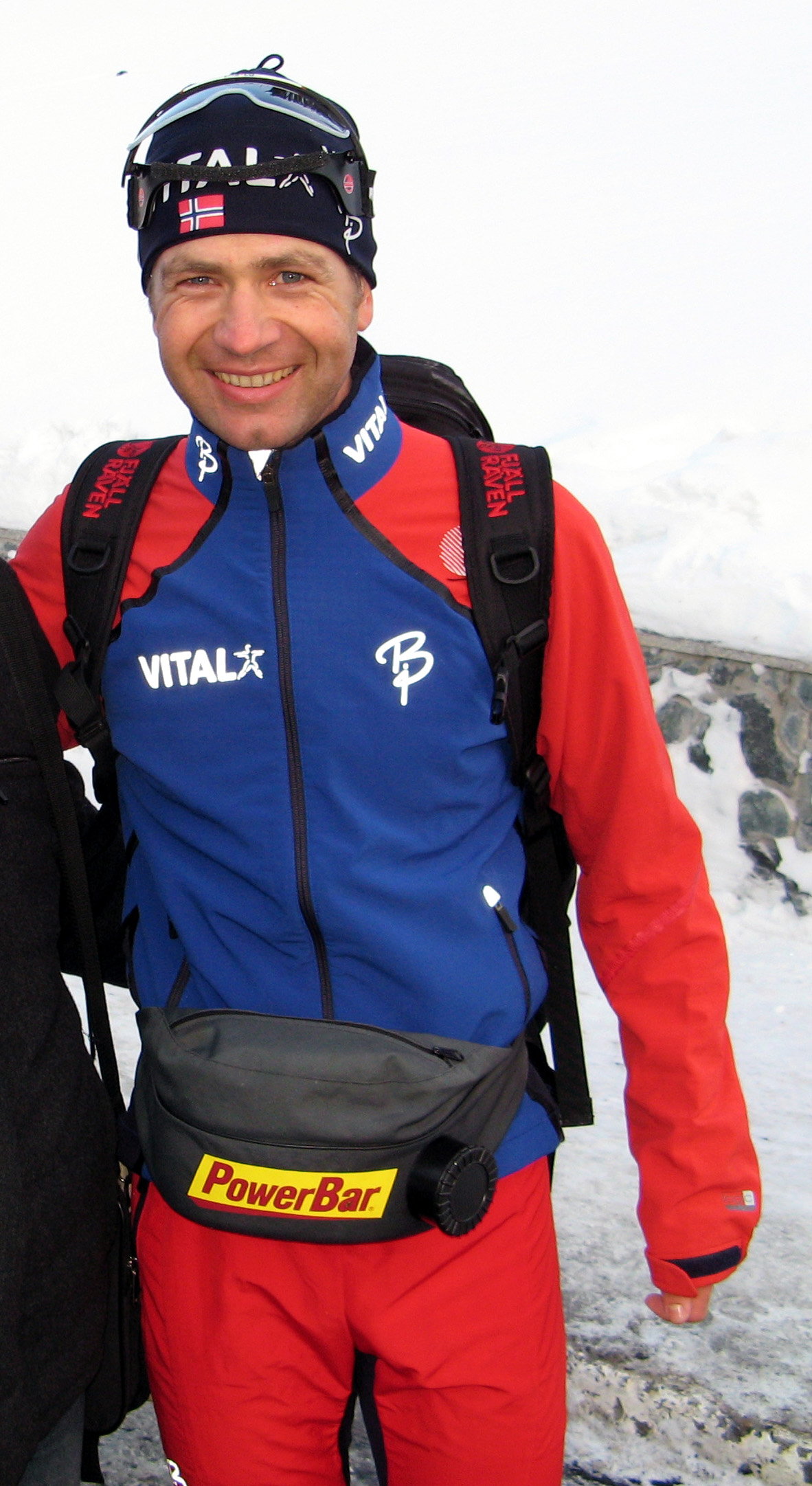
Ole Einar Bjørndalen is the most successful male athlete at Winter Olympics. He is one of three Winter Olympians (and only biathlete) to win eight gold medals and earned more overall medals (14) than any male athlete in Winter Olympic history.

Men

Biathlete	Nation	Olympics *	Gold	Silver	Bronze	Total
Ole Einar Bjørndalen	Norway	1994–2014	**8**	**4**	2	**14**
Quentin Fillon Maillet	France	2018–**2026**	5	3	1	9
Johannes Thingnes Bø	Norway	2014–2022	5	2	1	8
Ricco Groß	Germany	1992–2006	4	3	1	8
Emil Hegle Svendsen	Norway	2006–2018	4	3	1	8
Sven Fischer	Germany	1994–2006	4	2	2	8
Martin Fourcade	France	2010–2018	6	1	0	7
Halvard Hanevold	Norway	1994–2010	3	2	1	6
Tarjei Bø	Norway	2010–2022	3	2	1	6
Sergei Tchepikov	Soviet Union; Unified Team; Russia	1988–1994, 2002–2006	2	3	1	6
Sturla Holm Lægreid	Norway	2022-**2026**	1	3	2	6
Alexander Tikhonov	Soviet Union	1968–1980	4	1	0	5
Frank Luck	East Germany; Germany	1988, 1994–2002	2	3	0	5
Peter Angerer	West Germany	1980–1988	1	2	2	5

Women

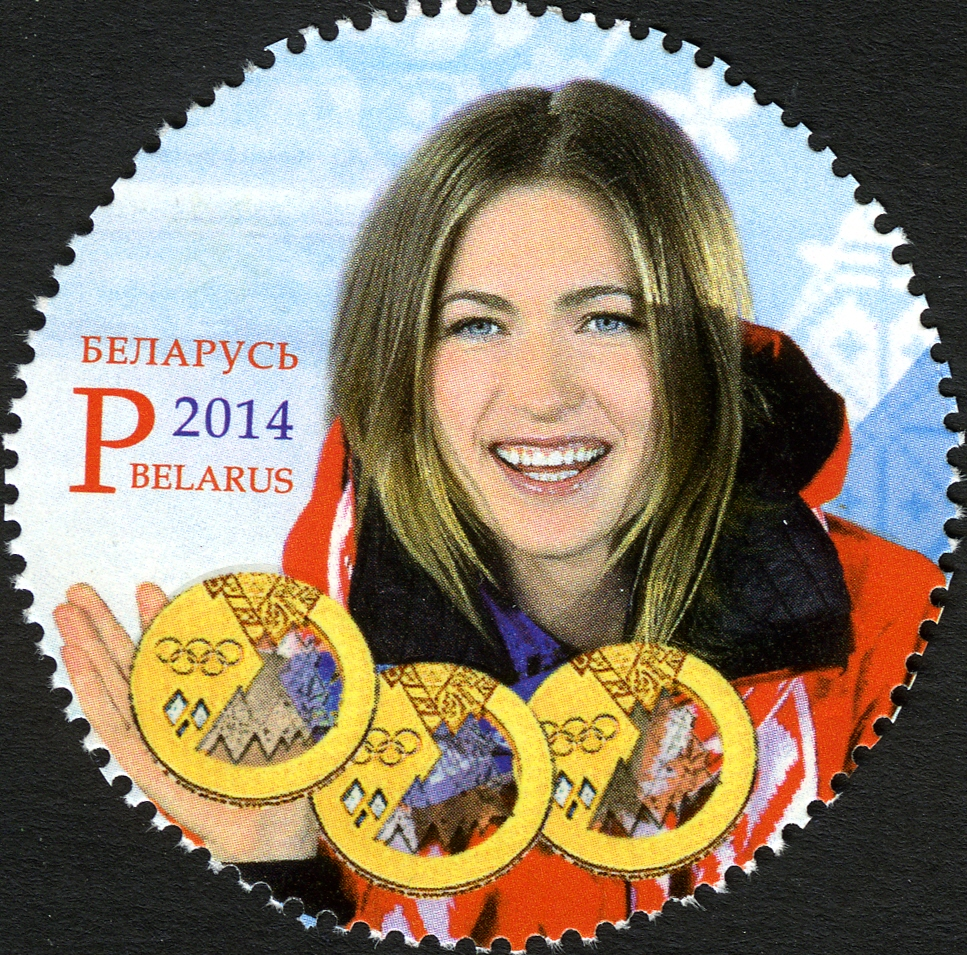
Darya Domracheva, Ole Einar Bjørndalen's wife, is the only woman to win four gold medals in biathlon.

Biathlete	Nation	Olympics *	Gold	Silver	Bronze	Total
Uschi Disl	Germany	1992–2006	2	**4**	3	9
Tiril Eckhoff	Norway	2014–2022	2	2	**4**	8
Kati Wilhelm	Germany	2002–2010	3	3	1	7
Marte Olsbu Røiseland	Norway	2018–2022	3	2	2	7
Darya Domracheva	Belarus	2010–2018	**4**	1	1	6
Anastasiya Kuzmina	Slovakia	2010–2018, **2026**	3	3	0	6
Albina Akhatova	Russia	1998–2006	1	1	3	5
Julia Simon	France	2022-**2026**	3	0	1	4
Katrin Apel	Germany	1998–2006	2	1	1	4
Tora Berger	Norway	2006–2014	2	1	1	4
Andrea Henkel	Germany	2002–2014	2	1	1	4
Antje Misersky-Harvey	Germany	1992–1994	1	3	0	4
Marie Dorin Habert	France	2010–2018	1	1	2	4
Dorothea Wierer	Italy	2014–**2026**	0	1	3	4

* denotes all Olympics in which mentioned biathletes took part. Boldface denotes latest Olympics.

=== Biathletes with most victories ===
Top 10 biathletes who won more gold medals at the Winter Olympics are listed below. Boldface denotes active biathletes and highest medal count among all biathletes (including those not in the tables) per type.

==== Men ====
Rank	Biathlete	Country	From *	To *	Gold	Silver	Bronze	Total
1	Ole Einar Bjørndalen	Norway	1998	2014	**8**	**4**	2	**14**
2	Martin Fourcade	France	2010	2018	6	1	-	7
3	**Quentin Fillon Maillet**	France	2018	2026	5	3	1	9
4	Johannes Thingnes Bø	Norway	2014	2022	5	2	1	8
5	Ricco Groß	Germany	1992	2006	4	3	1	8
5	Emil Hegle Svendsen	Norway	2010	2018	4	3	1	8
7	Sven Fischer	Germany	1994	2006	4	2	2	8
8	Alexander Tikhonov	Soviet Union	1968	1980	4	1	-	5
9	Tarjei Bø	Norway	2010	2022	3	2	1	6
9	Halvard Hanevold	Norway	1998	2010	3	2	1	6

==== Women ====
Rank	Biathlete	Country	From *	To *	Gold	Silver	Bronze	Total
1	Darya Domracheva	Belarus	2010	2018	**4**	1	1	6
2	Kati Wilhelm	Germany	2002	2010	3	3	1	7
3	**Anastasiya Kuzmina**	Slovakia	2010	2018	3	3	-	6
4	Marte Olsbu Røiseland	Norway	2018	2022	3	2	2	7
5	**Julia Simon**	France	2022	2026	3	2	0	5
6	Uschi Disl	Germany	1992	2006	2	**4**	3	**9**
7	Tiril Eckhoff	Norway	2014	2022	2	2	**4**	8
8	**Hanna Öberg**	Sweden	2018	2026	2	2	-	4
9	Katrin Apel	Germany	1998	2006	2	1	1	4
9	Tora Berger	Norway	2010	2014	2	1	1	4
9	Andrea Henkel	Germany	2002	2010	2	1	1	4
9	**Lou Jeanmonnot**	France	2026	2026	2	1	1	4

* denotes only those Olympics at which mentioned biathletes won at least one medal

== Medals per year ==
×	NOC did not exist or did not participate in biathlon events	#	Number of medals won by the NOC	–	NOC did not win any medals

- bolded numbers indicate the highest medal count at that year's Olympic Games.

NOC	24	1928–56	60	64	68	72	76	80	84	88	92	94	98	02	06	10	14	18	22	26	Total
Austria	×		×	–	–	×	–	–	–	–	–	–	–	1	–	3	2	1	–	–	7
Belarus	×		×	×	×	×	×	×	×	×	×	1	1	–	–	2	4	2	1	–	11
Bulgaria	×		×	×	×	×	–	–	–	–	–	–	1	1	–	–	–	–	–	1	3
Canada	×		×	×	–	×	×	×	×	–	1	2	–	–	–	–	–	–	–	–	3
Croatia	×		×	×	×	×	×	×	×	×	×	×	×	–	–	1	–	–	–	–	1
Czech Republic	×		×	×	×	×	×	×	×	×	×	–	–	–	–	–	6	2	–	1	9
Finland	1		1	–	–	1	2	–	–	–	1	–	1	–	–	–	–	–	–	1	8
France	1		–	–	–	–	–	–	–	–	1	3	–	2	4	6	4	5	7	13	46
East Germany	×		×	×	–	2	1	4	2	2	×	×	×	×	×	×	×	×	×	×	11
West Germany	×		×	×	–	–	–	1	3	1	×	×	×	×	×	×	×	×	×	×	5
Germany	×		×	×	×	×	×	×	×	×	7	6	5	9	11	5	2	7	2	1	55
Italy	–		×	×	×	–	–	–	–	2	–	–	1	–	–	–	1	2	1	2	9
Kazakhstan	×		×	×	×	×	×	×	×	×	×	–	–	–	–	1	–	–	–	–	1
Norway	×		–	1	2	1	–	–	3	–	–	–	5	6	6	5	7	6	14	11	67
Poland	–		×	–	–	–	–	×	×	×	–	–	–	–	1	–	–	–	–	–	1
Soviet Union	×		1	2	3	1	3	4	1	4	×	×	×	×	×	×	×	×	×	×	19
Unified Team	×		×	×	×	×	×	×	×	×	6	×	×	×	×	×	×	×	×	×	6
Russia	×		×	×	×	×	×	×	×	×	×	5	3	3	5	2	2	×	×	×	20
ROC	×		×	×	×	×	×	×	×	×	×	×	×	×	×	×	×	×	4	×	4
Slovakia	×		×	×	×	×	×	×	×	×	×	–	–	–	–	3	1	3	–	–	7
Slovenia	×		×	×	×	×	×	×	×	×	–	–	–	–	–	–	1	1	–	–	2
Sweden	×		1	–	1	1	–	–	–	–	2	–	–	2	2	2	–	4	4	3	22
Switzerland	1		–	–	–	–	–	–	–	–	–	–	–	–	–	–	1	–	–	–	2
Ukraine	×		×	×	×	×	×	×	×	×	×	1	1	–	1	–	2	–	–	–	5

== See also ==
- Biathlon World Championships
- Biathlon World Cup
- List of IOC country codes
- Military patrol at the 1924 Winter Olympics
