= Biathlon at the 1976 Winter Olympics – Relay =

Men's biathlon relay at the XII Olympic Winter Games
- Venue: Seefeld
- Dates: February 13, 1976
- Competitors: 60 from 15 nations
- Winning time: 1:57:55.64

Medalists
1st place, gold medalist(s)		Soviet Union; Aleksandr Elizarov; Ivan Biakov; Nikolay Kruglov; Aleksandr Tikhonov
2nd place, silver medalist(s)		Finland; Henrik Flöjt; Esko Saira; Juhani Suutarinen; Heikki Ikola
3rd place, bronze medalist(s)		East Germany; Karl-Heinz Menz; Frank Ullrich; Manfred Beer; Manfred Geyer

The Men's 4 × 7.5 kilometre biathlon relay competition at the 1976 Winter Olympics took place on 13 February, at Seefeld. Each national team consisted of four members, with each skiing 7.5 kilometres and shooting twice, once prone and once standing.

At each shooting station, a competitor has eight shots to hit five targets; however, only five bullets are loaded in a magazine at one - if additional shots are required, the spare bullets must be loaded one at a time. If after the eight shots are taken, there are still targets not yet hit, the competitor must ski a 150-metre penalty loop.

== Summary ==
The Soviet Union had lost just one major championship in the last nine years, but it was also the most recent one, as they were beaten to the 1975 world championship by the Finns. The chances of this repeating were all but eliminated after the first leg, however; while Aleksandr Elizarov went through in the fastest time, more than 30 seconds clear, Henrik Flöjt missed a shot and finished the leg 7th, well over two minutes behind. Esko Saira made up some ground on the Soviets, and pulled Finland into second, but Kruglov and Tikhonov put together two of the three fastest legs of the competition to close out a gold medal win.

The Finns were in a battle with the West Germans after two legs, but Josef Keck took three penalties, and left Finland with a big gap, which they easily took to a silver medal. East Germany had been floundering in 7th after three legs, as Frank Ullrich struggled with her shooting, taking four penalties. However, Manfred Geyer shot clear and had the second fastest leg overall, pulling them up past four teams to get the bronze medal.

== Results ==
Rank	Bib	Team	Penalties (P+S)	Time	Deficit
1st place, gold medalist(s)	11	Soviet Union; Aleksandr Elizarov; Ivan Biakov; Nikolay Kruglov; Aleksandr Tikhonov	0; 0 0; 0 0; 0 0; 0 0	1:57:55.64; 29:47.44; 30:16.79; 29:04.80; 28:46.61	–
2nd place, silver medalist(s)	5	Finland; Henrik Flöjt; Esko Saira; Juhani Suutarinen; Heikki Ikola	2; 0 1; 0 0; 0 1; 0 0	2:01:45.58; 32:00.19; 29:12.47; 30:52.23; 29:40.69	+3:49.94
3rd place, bronze medalist(s)	20	East Germany; Karl-Heinz Menz; Frank Ullrich; Manfred Beer; Manfred Geyer	5; 0 0; 2 2; 0 1; 0 0	2:04:08.61; 31:02.18; 32:47.28; 31:30.01; 28:49.14	+6:12.96
4	3	West Germany; Heinrich Mehringer; Gerd Winkler; Josef Keck; Claus Gehrke	4; 0 0; 1 0; 3 0; 0 0	2:04:11.86; 30:38.46; 30:42.83; 32:15.08; 30:35.49	+6:16.21
5	23	Norway; Kjell Hovda; Terje Hanssen; Svein Engen; Tor Svendsberget	6; 0 2; 0 3; 0 0; 0 1	2:05:10.28; 33:24.66; 31:20.50; 29:20.67; 31:04.45	+7:14.63
6	15	Italy; Lino Jordan; Pierantonio Clementi; Luigi Weiss; Willy Bertin	3; 0 1; 0 0; 0 1; 0 1	2:06:16.55; 31:52.53; 31:45.82; 30:59.51; 31:38.69	+8:20.91
7	24	France; René Arpin; Yvon Mougel; Marius Falquy; Jean-Claude Viry	5; 0 2; 0 0; 1 0; 0 2	2:07:34.42; 32:17.67; 29:58.45; 31:40.41; 33:37.89	+9:38.78
8	18	Sweden; Mats-Åke Lantz; Torsten Wadman; Sune Adolfsson; Lars-Göran Arwidson	8; 0 3; 1 2; 0 2; 0 0	2:08:46.90; 32:44.58; 32:45.74; 31:59.45; 31:17.13	+10:51.25
9	12	Czechoslovakia; Ladislav Žižka; Miroslav Soviš; Antonín Kříž; Zdeněk Pavlíček	4; 0 0; 0 1; 2 1; 0 0	2:09:06.63; 31:45.67; 31:49.07; 32:32.81; 32:59.08	+11:10.99
10	17	Romania; Nicolae Cristoloveanu; Gheorghe Voicu; Victor Fontana; Gheorghe Gârniţă	7; 1 3; 0 0; 1 0; 0 2	2:09:54.40; 35:23.57; 30:26.75; 32:01.12; 32:02.96	+11:58.75
11	21	United States; Lyle Nelson; Dennis Donahue; John Morton; Peter Dascoulias	4; 0 0; 0 2; 0 1; 0 1	2:10:17.72; 30:29.17; 33:11.78; 33:09.08; 33:27.69	+12:22.08
12	6	Poland; Jan Szpunar; Andrzej Rapacz; Ludwik Zięba; Wojciech Truchan	9; 4 2; 0 2; 0 0; 1 0	2:11:46.54; 36:25.42; 32:24.37; 30:33.06; 32:23.69	+13:50.90
13	14	Great Britain; Malcolm Hirst; Jeffrey Stevens; Paul Gibbins; Graeme Ferguson	8; 0 3; 0 1; 0 2; 1 1	2:11:54.36; 33:33.15; 32:20.13; 32:37.31; 33:23.77	+13:58.71
14	8	Japan; Isao Ono; Hiroyuki Deguchi; Manabu Suzuki; Yoshiyuki Shirate	10; 3 0; 0 1; 2 1; 0 3	2:17:09.04; 33:19.43; 33:08.62; 34:27.07; 36:13.92	+19:13.40
15	9	Austria; Franz-Josef Weber; Alfred Eder; Klaus Farbmacher; Josef Hones	11; 0 2; 2 3; 0 1; 1 2	2:18:06.78; 33:10.35; 34:27.12; 34:23.90; 36:05.41	+20:11.14
