= 1977–78 Biathlon World Cup =

Biathlon competition

1977–78 World Cup
| Discipline | Men | Women |
| Overall | (East Germany) Frank Ullrich | |

Competition

The 1977–78 Biathlon World Cup was a multi-race tournament over a season of biathlon, organised by the UIPMB (Union Internationale de Pentathlon Moderne et Biathlon). The season started on 13 January 1978 in Ruhpolding, West Germany, and ended in April 1978 in Sodankylä, Finland. It was the first ever season of the Biathlon World Cup, and it was only held for men.

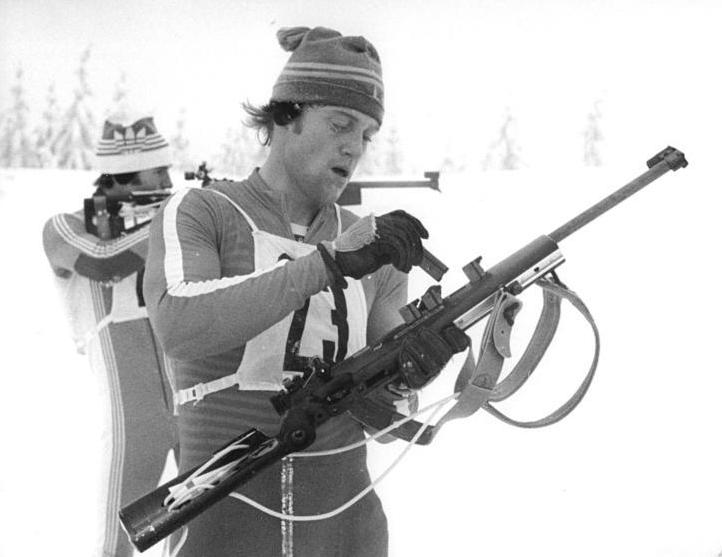
Frank Ullrich and Klaus Siebert at the East German Championships in 1978

== Calendar ==
Below is the World Cup calendar for the 1977–78 season.

| Location | Date | Individual | Sprint | Relay |
|---|---|---|---|---|
| (West Germany) Ruhpolding | 13–15 January | ● | ● | ● |
| (Italy) Antholz-Anterselva | 21–25 February | ● | ● | ● |
| (Austria) Hochfilzen | 2–5 March | ● | ● | ● |
| (Soviet Union) Murmansk | 24–29 March | ● | ● | ● |
| (Finland) Sodankylä | 1–2 April | ● | ● | ● |
| Total | | 5 | 5 | 5 |

*The relays were technically unofficial races as they did not count towards anything in the World Cup.

== World Cup podium ==
=== Men ===
| Stage | Date | Place | Discipline | Winner | Second | Third | Yellow bib (After competition) | Det. |
|---|---|---|---|---|---|---|---|---|
| 1 | 14 January 1978 | (West Germany) Ruhpolding | 20 km Individual | (East Germany) Klaus Siebert | (East Germany) Eberhard Rösch | (West Germany) Andreas Schweiger | (East Germany) Klaus Siebert | Detail |
| 1 | 15 January 1978 | (West Germany) Ruhpolding | 10 km Sprint | (Norway) Sigleif Johansen | (East Germany) Eberhard Rösch | (East Germany) Frank Ullrich | (East Germany) Eberhard Rösch | Detail |
| 2 | 23 February 1978 | (Italy) Antholz-Anterselva | 20 km Individual | (East Germany) Frank Ullrich | (Soviet Union) Alexander Ushakov | (Soviet Union) Nikolay Kruglov | (East Germany) Frank Ullrich | Detail |
| 2 | 25 February 1978 | (Italy) Antholz-Anterselva | 10 km Sprint | (East Germany) Klaus Siebert | (East Germany) Eberhard Rösch | (Soviet Union) Vladimir Barnashov | (East Germany) Frank Ullrich | Detail |
| WC | 2 March 1978 | (Austria) Hochfilzen | 20 km Individual | (Norway) Odd Lirhus | (East Germany) Frank Ullrich | (East Germany) Eberhard Rösch | (East Germany) Frank Ullrich | Detail |
| WC | 4 March 1978 | (Austria) Hochfilzen | 10 km Sprint | (East Germany) Frank Ullrich | (East Germany) Eberhard Rösch | (East Germany) Klaus Siebert | (East Germany) Frank Ullrich | Detail |
| 3 | 25 March 1978 | (Soviet Union) Murmansk | 20 km Individual | (Soviet Union) Nikolay Kruglov | (Soviet Union) Anatoly Alyabyev | (Soviet Union) Vladimir Artemyev | (East Germany) Frank Ullrich | Detail |
| 3 | 27 March 1978 | (Soviet Union) Murmansk | 10 km Sprint | (East Germany) Frank Ullrich | (Soviet Union) Nikolay Kruglov | (Norway) Sigleif Johansen | (East Germany) Frank Ullrich | Detail |
| 4 | 1 April 1978 | (Finland) Sodankylä | 20 km Individual | (East Germany) Klaus Siebert | (Soviet Union) Vladimir Otchnev | (Norway) Svein Engen | (East Germany) Frank Ullrich | Detail |
| 4 | 2 April 1978 | (Finland) Sodankylä | 10 km Sprint | (Soviet Union) Vladimir Barnashov | (Finland) Heikki Ikola | (Soviet Union) Alexander Tikhonov | (East Germany) Frank Ullrich | Detail |

== Standings ==
=== Overall ===
| Pos. | | Points |
|---|---|---|
| 1. | (East Germany) Frank Ullrich | 144 |
| 2. | (East Germany) Klaus Siebert | 137 |
| 3. | (East Germany) Eberhard Rösch | 133 |
| 4. | (Soviet Union) Vladimir Barnashov | 125 |
| 5. | (Soviet Union) Nikolay Kruglov | 119 |

- Final standings after 10 races.

== Achievements ==
First World Cup career victory

- Klaus Siebert (GDR), 22, in his 1st season — the WC 1 Individual in Ruhpolding; it also was his first podium and the first podium for an East German biathlete
- Sigleif Johansen (NOR), 29, in his 1st season — the WC 1 Sprint in Ruhpolding; it also was his first podium and the first podium for a Norwegian biathlete
- Frank Ullrich (GDR), 20, in his 1st season — the WC 2 Individual in Ruhpolding; first podium was 1977–78 Sprint in Ruhpolding
- Odd Lirhus (NOR), 21, in his 1st season — the World Championships Individual in Hochfilzen; it also was his first podium
- Nikolay Kruglov (URS), 28, in his 1st season — the WC 3 Individual in Murmansk; first podium was 1977–78 Individual in Antholz-Anterselva
- Vladimir Barnashov (URS), 27, in his 1st season — the WC 4 Sprint in Sodankylä; first podium was 1977–78 Sprint in Antholz-Anterselva

First World Cup podium

- Eberhard Rösch (GDR), 27, in his 1st season — no. 2 in the WC 1 Individual in Ruhpolding
- Andreas Schweiger (FRG), 24, in his 1st season — no. 3 in the WC 1 Individual in Ruhpolding; it also was the first podium for a West German biathlete
- Frank Ullrich (GDR), 19, in his 1st season — no. 3 in the WC 1 Sprint in Ruhpolding
- Alexander Ushakov (URS), 29, in his 1st season — no. 2 in the WC 2 Individual in Antholz-Anterselva; it also was the first podium for a Soviet biathlete
- Nikolay Kruglov (URS), 28, in his 1st season — no. 3 in the WC 2 Individual in Antholz-Anterselva
- Anatoly Alyabyev (URS), 26, in his 1st season — no. 2 in the WC 3 Individual in Murmansk
- Vladimir Artemiev (URS), in his 1st season — no. 3 in the WC 3 Individual in Murmansk
- Vladimir Barnashov (URS), 26, in his 1st season — no. 3 in the WC 2 Sprint in Antholz-Anterselva
- Vladimir Otchnev (URS), in his 1st season — no. 2 in the WC 4 Individual in Sodankylä
- Svein Engen (NOR), 25, in his 1st season — no. 3 in the WC 4 Individual in Sodankylä
- Heikki Ikola (FIN), 30, in his 1st season — no. 2 in the WC 4 Sprint in Sodankylä; it also was the first podium for a Finnish biathlete
- Alexander Tikhonov (URS), 31, in his 1st season — no. 3 in the WC 4 Sprint in Sodankylä

Victory in this World Cup (all-time number of victories in parentheses)

- Klaus Siebert (GDR), 3 (3) first places
- Frank Ullrich (GDR), 3 (3) first places
- Sigleif Johansen (NOR), 1 (1) first place
- Odd Lirhus (NOR), 1 (1) first place
- Nikolay Kruglov (URS), 1 (1) first place
- Vladimir Barnashov (URS), 1 (1) first place

== Retirements ==
Following notable biathletes retired after the 1977–78 season:

- Juhani Suutarinen (FIN)
- Aleksandr Elizarov (URS)
