= Finland at the 1976 Winter Olympics =

- IOC code: FIN
- NOC: Finnish Olympic Committee
- Website: sport.fi/olympiakomitea (in Finnish and Swedish)

in Innsbruck
- Competitors: 47 (38 men, 9 women) in 8 sports
- Flag bearer: Rauno Miettinen (Nordic combined)
- Medals Ranked 6th: Gold 2 Silver 4 Bronze 1 Total 7

Winter Olympics appearances (overview)
- 1924; 1928; 1932; 1936; 1948; 1952; 1956; 1960; 1964; 1968; 1972; 1976; 1980; 1984; 1988; 1992; 1994; 1998; 2002; 2006; 2010; 2014; 2018; 2022; 2026

Finland competed at the 1976 Winter Olympics in Innsbruck, Austria.

== Medalists ==
Medal	Name	Sport	Event
Gold	Arto Koivisto; Juha Mieto; Matti Pitkänen; Pertti Teurajärvi	Cross-country skiing	Men's 4 × 10 km relay
Gold	Helena Takalo	Cross-country skiing	Women's 5 km
Silver	Heikki Ikola	Biathlon	Men's 20 km
Silver	Henrik Flöjt; Heikki Ikola; Esko Saira; Juhani Suutarinen	Biathlon	Men's 4 x 7.5 km relay
Silver	Helena Takalo	Cross-country skiing	Women's 10 km
Silver	Marjatta Kajosmaa; Hilkka Riihivuori; Liisa Suihkonen; Helena Takalo	Cross-country skiing	Women's 4 × 5 km relay
Bronze	Arto Koivisto	Cross-country skiing	Men's 15 km

== Alpine skiing ==
Women

Athlete	Event	Race 1		Race 2		Total	
Athlete	Event	Time	Rank	Time	Rank	Time	Rank
Riitta Ollikka	Downhill					1:53.85	30
Riitta Ollikka	Giant Slalom					1:40.15	34
Riitta Ollikka	Slalom	54.23	26	51.39	17	1:45.62	17

== Biathlon ==
Men

Event	Athlete	Time	Penalties	Adjusted time ^{1}	Rank
20 km	Juhani Suutarinen	1'17:25.89	2	1'19:25.89	13
20 km	Esko Saira	1'15:32.84	2	1'17:32.84	6
20 km	Heikki Ikola	1'13:54.10	2	1'15:54.10	2nd place, silver medalist(s)

^{1} One minute added per close miss (a hit in the outer ring), two minutes added per complete miss.

Men's 4 x 7.5 km relay

Athletes	Race		
Athletes	Misses ^{2}	Time	Rank
Henrik Flöjt; Esko Saira; Juhani Suutarinen; Heikki Ikola	2	2'01:45.58	2nd place, silver medalist(s)

^{2} A penalty loop of 200 metres had to be skied per missed target.

== Cross-country skiing ==
Men

Event	Athlete	Race	
Event	Athlete	Time	Rank
15 km	Risto Kiiskinen	47:21.06	32
15 km	Pertti Teurajärvi	46:04.84	14
15 km	Juha Mieto	45:46.27	10
15 km	Arto Koivisto	44:19.25	3rd place, bronze medalist(s)
30 km	Juhani Repo	1'35:31.06	22
30 km	Matti Pitkänen	1'33:44.74	13
30 km	Arto Koivisto	1'32:23.11	8
30 km	Juha Mieto	1'31:20.39	4
50 km	Juha Mieto	2'50:03.61	34
50 km	Pertti Teurajärvi	2'47:25.60	27
50 km	Arto Koivisto	2'43:44.79	10
50 km	Juhani Repo	2'42:54.89	9

Men's 4 × 10 km relay

Athletes	Race	
Athletes	Time	Rank
Matti Pitkänen; Juha Mieto; Pertti Teurajärvi; Arto Koivisto	2'07:59.72	1st place, gold medalist(s)

Women

Event	Athlete	Race	
Event	Athlete	Time	Rank
5 km	Taina Impiö	17:03.30	19
5 km	Marjatta Kajosmaa	16:36.25	9
5 km	Hilkka Kuntola	16:17.74	4
5 km	Helena Takalo	15:48.69	1st place, gold medalist(s)
10 km	Marja-Liisa Hämäläinen	32:37.72	22
10 km	Marjatta Kajosmaa	31:35.50	11
10 km	Hilkka Kuntola	31:29.39	9
10 km	Helena Takalo	30:14.28	2nd place, silver medalist(s)

Women's 4 × 5 km relay

Athletes	Race	
Athletes	Time	Rank
Liisa Suihkonen; Marjatta Kajosmaa; Hilkka Kuntola; Helena Takalo	1'08:36.57	2nd place, silver medalist(s)

== Figure skating ==
Men

Athlete	CF	SP	FS	Points	Places	Rank
Pekka Leskinen	13	14	14	166.98	119	13

== Ice hockey ==
=== First round ===
Winners (in bold) entered the Medal Round. Other teams played a consolation round for 7th-12th places.

Team 1	Score	Team 2
**Finland**	11–2	Japan

=== Medal round ===
Rank		Pld	W	L	T	GF	GA	Pts
1	Soviet Union	5	5	0	0	40	11	10
2	Czechoslovakia	5	3	2	0	17	10	6
3	West Germany	5	2	3	0	21	24	4
4	Finland	5	2	3	0	19	18	4
5	United States	5	2	3	0	15	21	4
6	Poland	5	1	4	0	9	37	2

- Czechoslovakia 2-1 Finland
- Finland 5-3 West Germany
- USA 5-4 Finland
- USSR 7-2 Finland
- Finland 7-1 Poland
- **Team roster**
  - Matti Hagman
  - Reijo Laksola
  - Antti Leppänen
  - Henry Leppä
  - Seppo Lindström
  - Pekka Marjamäki
  - Matti Murto
  - Timo Nummelin
  - Esa Peltonen
  - Timo Saari
  - Jorma Vehmanen
  - Urpo Ylönen
  - Hannu Haapalainen
  - Seppo Ahokainen
  - Tapio Koskinen
  - Pertti Koivulahti
  - Hannu Kapanen
  - Matti Rautiainen
- Head coaches: Seppo Liitsola & Lasse Heikkilä

== Nordic combined ==
Events:

- normal hill ski jumping (Three jumps, best two counted and shown here.)
- 15 km cross-country skiing

Athlete	Event	Ski Jumping				Cross-country			Total	
Athlete	Event	Distance 1	Distance 2	Points	Rank	Time	Points	Rank	Points	Rank
Jorma Etelälahti	Individual	69.0	72.0	185.1	24	52:05.85	183.35	23	368.45	24
Jukka Kuvaja	Individual	71.0	74.5	197.3	13	50:03.26	201.74	9	399.04	11
Rauno Miettinen	Individual	75.0	78.5	219.9	2	51:12.21	191.40	19	411.30	4
Erkki Kilpinen	Individual	74.0	75.0	203.1	8	50:20.46	199.16	11	402.26	10

== Ski jumping ==
Athlete	Event	Jump 1		Jump 2		Total	
Athlete	Event	Distance	Points	Distance	Points	Points	Rank
Harri Blumén	Normal hill	75.5	105.6	75.0	104.8	210.4	29
Jouko Törmänen	Normal hill	78.5	112.4	78.0	112.6	225.0	14
Esko Rautionaho	Normal hill	79.5	116.5	78.0	113.1	229.6	11
Harri Blumén	Large hill	81.0	84.4	77.0	76.3	160.7	41
Rauno Miettinen	Large hill	95.5	96.2	83.0	89.2	185.4	21
Esko Rautionaho	Large hill	90.0	103.5	84.5	94.3	197.8	12
Jouko Törmänen	Large hill	91.0	105.4	87.5	99.5	204.9	10

== Speed skating ==
Men

Event	Athlete	Race	
Event	Athlete	Time	Rank
500 m	Pertti Niittylä	40.65	15
1000 m	Pertti Niittylä	1:21.43	8
1500 m	Olavi Köppä	2:03.69	10
5000 m	Olavi Köppä	7:59.52	20
10,000 m	Olavi Köppä	15:39.73	9

Women

Event	Athlete	Race	
Event	Athlete	Time	Rank
500 m	Paula-Irmeli Halonen	43.99	8
1000 m	Tuula Vilkas	1:32.94	17
1000 m	Paula-Irmeli Halonen	1:31.72	13
1500 m	Tuula Vilkas	2:24.55	20
3000 m	Paula-Irmeli Halonen	5:03.08	22
3000 m	Tuula Vilkas	4:51.71	12
