= Tor Svendsberget =

Norwegian biathlete (born 1947)

Personal information
- Full name: Tor Svendsberget
- Born: 3 November 1947 (age 78) Aust-Torpa, Oppland, Norway
- Height: 1.74 m (5 ft 9 in)

Sport

Professional information
- Sport: Biathlon
- Club: Engerdal SK

Olympic Games
- Teams: 2 (1972, 1976)
- Medals: 0

World Championships
- Teams: 9 (1969, 1970, 1971, 1973, 1974, 1975, 1976, 1977, 1978)
- Medals: 8 (0 gold)

World Cup
- Seasons: 2 (1977/78–1978/79)
- All victories: 0
- All podiums: 0
Medal record
Men's biathlon
Representing Norway
World Championships
Silver medal – second place	1970 Östersund	20 km individual
Silver medal – second place	1970 Östersund	4 × 7.5 km relay
Silver medal – second place	1971 Hämeenlinna	4 × 7.5 km relay
Silver medal – second place	1973 Lake Placid	4 × 7.5 km relay
Silver medal – second place	1978 Hochfilzen	4 × 7.5 km relay
Bronze medal – third place	1973 Lake Placid	20 km individual
Bronze medal – third place	1974 Minsk	20 km individual
Bronze medal – third place	1974 Minsk	4 × 7.5 km relay

Tor Svendsberget (born 3 November 1947) is a former Norwegian biathlete.

== Life and career ==
Svendsberget was born on 3 November 1947 in the village of Aust-Torpa in Torpa Municipality, Oppland county, Norway.

He won a silver medal in 20 km at the 1970 Biathlon World Championships in Östersund, and bronze medals in Lake Placid 1973 and in Minsk 1974.

He represented Norway at the 1972 Winter Olympics, skiing first leg in the relay, with team mates Kåre Hovda, Ivar Nordkild and Magnar Solberg, where the Norwegian team placed fourth.

He has received four silver medals (1970, 1971, 1973, 1978) and one bronze medal (1974) in 4 × 7.5 km relay in the Biathlon World Championships with the Norwegian team. Svendsberget became junior world champion in 1967 and 1968.

Ahead of the 1979–80 season, Svendsberget was not reselected for the Norwegian national biathlon team. As a consequence, Svendsberget retired from the sport.

== Biathlon results ==
All results are sourced from the International Biathlon Union.

=== Olympic Games ===
Event	Individual	Relay
(Japan) 1972 Sapporo	8th	4th
(Austria) 1976 Innsbruck	9th	5th

=== World Championships ===
8 medals (5 silver, 3 bronze)

Event	Individual	Sprint	Relay
(Polish People's Republic) 1969 Zakopane	23rd	—N/a	—
(Sweden) 1970 Östersund	Silver	—N/a	Silver
(Finland) 1971 Hämeenlinna	—	—N/a	Silver
(United States) 1973 Lake Placid	Bronze	—N/a	Silver
(Soviet Union) 1974 Minsk	Bronze	29th	Bronze
(Italy) 1975 Antholz-Anterselva	4th	14th	5th
(Italy) 1976 Antholz-Anterselva	—N/a	9th	—N/a
(Norway) 1977 Lillehammer	8th	9th	4th
(Austria) 1978 Hochfilzen	—	—	Silver

*During Olympic seasons competitions are only held for those events not included in the Olympic program.
**Sprint was added as an event in 1974.
