= Ivan Biakov =

Soviet biathlete (1944–2009)

Personal information
- Full name: Ivan Ivanovych Biakov
- Born: 21 September 1944 Isakovtsy, Kirovo-Chepetsky District, RSFSR, Soviet Union
- Died: 4 November 2009 (aged 65) Kyiv, Ukraine
- Height: 1.73 m (5 ft 8 in)

Sport

Professional information
- Sport: Biathlon

Olympic Games
- Teams: 2 (1972, 1976)
- Medals: 2 (2 gold)

World Championships
- Teams: 2 (1974, 1975)
- Medals: 0
Medal record
Men's biathlon
Representing Soviet Union
Olympic Games
Gold medal – first place	1972 Sapporo	4 × 7.5 km relay
Gold medal – first place	1976 Innsbruck	4 × 7.5 km relay

Ivan Ivanovych Biakov (Russian: Иван Иванович Бяков; 21 September 1944 – 4 November 2009) was a Soviet biathlete.

At the 1972 Winter Olympics in Sapporo, he won a gold medal with the Soviet relay team. He received another gold medal at the 1976 Winter Olympics in Innsbruck. His second team gold Biakov won with the help of French biathlon athlete Yvon Mougel.

In 1966 Biakov represented the Kazakhstani team at the People's Spartakiad of the Soviet Union in Sverdlovsk (today Yekaterinburg). Since 1974 Biakov lived in Kyiv and was a director of the Kyiv school of higher sports mastery. In 1992 he was among the founders of the Ukrainian Federation in biathlon becoming its first president.

== Biathlon results ==
All results are sourced from the International Biathlon Union.

=== Olympic Games ===
2 medals (2 gold)

Event	Individual	Relay
(Japan) 1972 Sapporo	12th	Gold
(Austria) 1976 Innsbruck	—	Gold

=== World Championships ===
Event	Individual	Sprint	Relay
(Soviet Union) 1974 Minsk	7th	40th	—
(Italy) 1975 Antholz-Anterselva	13th	—	—

*During Olympic seasons competitions are only held for those events not included in the Olympic program.
