= Gennady Kovalev (biathlete) =

Soviet-Russian biathlete (1945–2024)

Personal information
- Nationality: Soviet Union; Russia
- Born: Gennady Ivanovich Kovalev; 10 October 1945 Novy Durulguy, Ononsky District, Chita Oblast, Russian SFSR, USSR
- Died: 30 December 2024 (aged 79) Chita, Zabaykalsky Krai, Russia

Sport
Medal record
Men's biathlon
Representing Soviet Union
World Championships
Gold medal – first place	1973 Lake Placid	4 × 7.5 km relay
Silver medal – second place	1973 Lake Placid	20 km individual

Gennady Ivanovich Kovalev (10 October 1945 – 30 December 2024) was a Soviet-Russian biathlete.

== Life and career ==
Kovalev was born in the village of Novy Durulguy, Ononsky District, Chita Oblast. He was a lieutenant colonel in the Russian Armed Forces.

Kovalev competed at the 1973 Biathlon World Championships, winning a gold and silver medal in two events. He then competed at the 1974 Biathlon World Championships, finishing in 17th place in the 20 km individual event.

== Death ==
Kovalev died in Chita on 30 December 2024, at the age of 79.
