= Heikki Ikola =

Finnish biathlete

Personal information
- Full name: Heikki Johannes Ikola
- Nickname: Hessu
- Born: 9 September 1947 (age 78) Jurva, Finland
- Height: 1.81 m (5 ft 11 in)

Sport

Professional information
- Sport: Biathlon
- World Cup debut: 13 January 1978

Olympic Games
- Teams: 3 (1972, 1976, 1980)
- Medals: 3 (0 gold)

World Championships
- Teams: 10 (1971, 1973, 1974, 1975, 1976, 1977, 1978, 1979, 1981, 1982)
- Medals: 7 (4 gold)

World Cup
- Seasons: 5 (1977/78–1981/82)
- Individual victories: 1
- Individual podiums: 2
Medal record
Men's biathlon
Representing Finland
Olympic Games
Silver medal – second place	1972 Sapporo	4 × 7.5 km relay
Silver medal – second place	1976 Innsbruck	20 km individual
Silver medal – second place	1976 Innsbruck	4 × 7.5 km relay
World Championships
Gold medal – first place	1975 Antholz-Anterselva	20 km individual
Gold medal – first place	1975 Antholz-Anterselva	4 × 7.5 km relay
Gold medal – first place	1977 Lillehammer	20 km individual
Gold medal – first place	1981 Lahti	20 km individual
Silver medal – second place	1974 Minsk	4 × 7.5 km relay
Silver medal – second place	1977 Lillehammer	4 × 7.5 km relay
Silver medal – second place	1979 Ruhpolding	4 × 7.5 km relay

Heikki Johannes Ikola (born 9 September 1947) is a Finnish former biathlete. Together with his countryman Juhani Suutarinen he became dominant in the 1970s and the early 1980s. In 1975 he became double world champion in both the 20 km and the relay. He also won the sprint title at the 1977 and 1981 World Championships.

Nowadays Ikola works as a commentator for Finnish channel Yle.

== Biathlon results ==
All results are sourced from the International Biathlon Union.

=== Olympic Games ===
3 medals (3 silver)

Event	Individual	Sprint	Relay
(Japan) 1972 Sapporo	—	—N/a	Silver
(Austria) 1976 Innsbruck	Silver	—N/a	Silver
(United States) 1980 Lake Placid	18th	—	—

*Sprint was added as an event in 1980.

=== World Championships ===
7 medals (4 gold, 3 silver)

Event	Individual	Sprint	Relay
(Finland) 1971 Hämeenlinna	10th	—N/a	4th
(United States) 1973 Lake Placid	11th	—N/a	4th
(Soviet Union) 1974 Minsk	4th	13th	Silver
(Italy) 1975 Antholz-Anterselva	Gold	4th	Gold
(Italy) 1976 Antholz-Anterselva	—N/a	4th	—N/a
(Norway) 1977 Lillehammer	Gold	5th	Silver
(Austria) 1978 Hochfilzen	4th	—	—
(West Germany) 1979 Ruhpolding	7th	DNF	Silver
(Finland) 1981 Lahti	Gold	9th	6th
(Soviet Union) 1982 Minsk	26th	16th	—

*During Olympic seasons competitions are only held for those events not included in the Olympic program.
**Sprint was added as an event in 1974.

=== Individual victories ===
1 victory (1 In)

Season	Date	Location	Discipline	Level
1980–81; 1 victory (1 In)	12 February 1981	(Finland) Lahti	20 km individual	Biathlon World Championships

*Results are from UIPMB and IBU races which include the Biathlon World Cup, Biathlon World Championships and the Winter Olympic Games.
