= Alexander Ushakov (biathlete) =

Soviet biathlete (1948–2024)

Personal information
- Full name: Alexander Andreevich Ushakov
- Born: 18 July 1948 Smirnovo, Udmurt ASSR, Russian SFSR, USSR
- Died: 14 August 2024 (aged 76)
- Height: 1.75 m (5 ft 9 in)

Sport

Professional information
- Sport: Biathlon

World Championships
- Teams: 8 (1970, 1971, 1973, 1974, 1975, 1976, 1977, 1978)
- Medals: 5 (3 gold)

World Cup
- Individual victories: 0
- Individual podiums: 1
Medal record
Men's biathlon
Representing Soviet Union
World Championships
Gold medal – first place	1977 Lillehammer	4 × 7.5 km relay
Gold medal – first place	1974 Minsk	4 × 7.5 km relay
Gold medal – first place	1970 Östersund	4 × 7.5 km relay
Silver medal – second place	1975 Antholz-Anterselva	4 × 7.5 km relay
Bronze medal – third place	1977 Lillehammer	10 km Sprint

Alexander Andreevich Ushakov (Russian: Александр Андреевич Ушаков; 18 July 1948 – 14 August 2024) was a Soviet biathlete. In his career, he won three gold medals, one silver and one bronze medal at the Biathlon World Championships. Ushakov died on 14 August 2024, at the age of 76.

== Biathlon results ==
All results are sourced from the International Biathlon Union.

=== World Championships ===
5 medals (3 gold, 1 silver, 1 bronze)

Event	Individual	Sprint	Relay
(Sweden) 1970 Östersund	9th	—N/a	Gold
(Finland) 1971 Hämeenlinna	9th	—N/a	—
(United States) 1973 Lake Placid	16th	—N/a	—
(Soviet Union) 1974 Minsk	—	14th	Gold
(Italy) 1975 Antholz-Anterselva	9th	9th	Silver
(Italy) 1976 Antholz-Anterselva	—N/a	18th	—N/a
(Norway) 1977 Lillehammer	10th	Bronze	Gold
(Austria) 1978 Hochfilzen	20th	18th	4th

*During Olympic seasons competitions are only held for those events not included in the Olympic program.
**Sprint was added as an event in 1974.
