= Zięba =

Zieba or Zięba ([ˈʑɛ̃mba]; literally finch) is a Polish-language surname. Notable people with the surname include:

- Barbara Zięba (born 1952), Polish gymnast
- Dariusz Zięba (born 1972), Polish badminton player
- Ludwik Zięba (born 1953), Polish biathlete
- Maciej Zięba (born 1987), Polish-German footballer
- Marzena Zięba (born 1987), Polish Paralympic powerlifter
- Nadieżda Zięba (born 1984), Polish badminton player

== See also ==
- Ziemba, alternative spelling
