= Miroslav Soviš =

Czech biathlete (1954–2015)

Personal information
- Nationality: Czech
- Born: 24 January 1954; Hluk, Czechoslovakia
- Died: 9 January 2015 (aged 60)

Sport
- Sport: Biathlon

Miroslav Soviš (24 January 1954 – 9 January 2015) was a Czech biathlete. He competed in the relay event at the 1976 Winter Olympics.
