= Simo Halonen =

Finnish biathlete

Medal record

Men's biathlon

Representing Finland

World Championships
Gold medal – first place	1975 Antholz-Anterselva	4 × 7.5 km relay
Silver medal – second place	1979 Ruhpolding	4 × 7.5 km relay
Silver medal – second place	1977 Lillehammer	4 × 7.5 km relay
Silver medal – second place	1974 Minsk	4 × 7.5 km relay

Simo Halonen is a Finnish biathlete and world champion. He received a gold medal in 4 × 7.5 km relay at the 1975 Biathlon World Championships in Antholz. He received three times silver medals in the world championships with the Finnish relay team.
