= Claus Gehrke =

German biathlete

Personal information
- Nationality: German
- Born: 6 April 1942 (age 82); Berlin, Germany

Sport
- Sport: Biathlon

Claus Gehrke (born 6 April 1942) is a German biathlete. He competed in the relay event at the 1976 Winter Olympics.
