= Ziemba =

Ziemba is a Polish surname, a historical spelling variant of "Zięba". Notable people with the surname include:

- Ed Ziemba (born 1932), Canadian politician
- Elaine Ziemba (born c.1942), Canadian politician
- Karen Ziemba (born 1957), American actress, singer and dancer
- Lee Ziemba (born 1989), American football player
- Menachem Ziemba (1883–1943), Polish rabbi
- Wojciech Ziemba (1941–2021), Polish archbishop

== See also ==
- Zięba, standard spelling
