= Zdeněk Pavlíček =

Czech biathlete (born 1952)

Personal information
- Nationality: Czech
- Born: 2 May 1952 (age 72); Zubří, Czechoslovakia

Sport
- Sport: Biathlon

Zdeněk Pavlíček (born 2 May 1952) is a Czech biathlete. He competed in the relay event at the 1976 Winter Olympics.
