= Juhani Suutarinen =

Finnish biathlete

Personal information
- Full name: Taisto Juhani Suutarinen
- Nicknames: Jussi; Kärppä-Jussi
- Born: 24 May 1943 (age 83) Uukuniemi, Parikkala, South Karelia, Finland
- Height: 1.64 m (5 ft 5 in)

Sport

Professional information
- Sport: Biathlon

Olympic Games
- Teams: 3 (1968, 1972, 1976)
- Medals: 2 (0 gold)

World Championships
- Teams: 8 (1966, 1970, 1971, 1973, 1974, 1975, 1976, 1977)
- Medals: 4 (3 gold)

World Cup
- Seasons: 1 (1977/78)
- Individual victories: 0
- Individual podiums: 0
Medal record
Men's biathlon
Representing Finland
Olympic Games
Silver medal – second place	1972 Sapporo	4 × 7.5 km relay
Silver medal – second place	1976 Innsbruck	4 × 7.5 km relay
World Championships
Gold medal – first place	1974 Minsk	20 km individual
Gold medal – first place	1974 Minsk	10 km sprint
Gold medal – first place	1975 Antholz-Anterselva	4 × 7.5 km relay
Silver medal – second place	1974 Minsk	4 × 7.5 km relay

Taisto Juhani Suutarinen (born 24 May 1943) is a Finnish former biathlete.

He made his international debut at the 1966 World Championships, but won his first international medal, a silver, in the relay at the 1972 Winter Olympics.

== Biathlon results ==
All results are sourced from the International Biathlon Union.

=== Olympic Games ===
2 medals (2 silver)

Event	Individual	Relay
(France) 1968 Grenoble	—	5th
(Japan) 1972 Sapporo	30th	Silver
(Austria) 1976 Innsbruck	13th	Silver

=== World Championships ===
4 medals (3 gold, 1 silver)

Event	Individual	Sprint	Relay
(West Germany) 1966 Garmisch-Partenkirchen	22nd	—N/a	5th
(Sweden) 1970 Östersund	10th	—N/a	4th
(Finland) 1971 Hämeenlinna	23rd	—N/a	—
(United States) 1973 Lake Placid	6th	—N/a	4th
(Soviet Union) 1974 Minsk	Gold	Gold	Silver
(Italy) 1975 Antholz-Anterselva	32nd	33rd	Gold
(Italy) 1976 Antholz-Anterselva	—N/a	40th	—N/a
(Norway) 1977 Lillehammer	—	20th	—

*During Olympic seasons competitions are only held for those events not included in the Olympic program.
**Sprint was added as an event in 1974.
