= Mats-Åke Lantz =

Swedish biathlete (born 1951)

Personal information
- Nationality: Swedish
- Born: 27 October 1951 (age 73); Östersund, Sweden

Sport
- Sport: Biathlon

Mats-Åke Lantz (born 27 October 1951) is a Swedish biathlete. He competed in the relay event at the 1976 Winter Olympics.
