= Josef Keck =

German biathlete

Personal information
- Nationality: German
- Born: 8 August 1950; Bad Oberdorf, West Germany
- Died: 11 May 2010 (aged 59); Vogtareuth, Germany

Sport
- Sport: Biathlon

Josef Keck (8 August 1950 – 11 May 2010) was a German biathlete. He competed in the relay event at the 1976 Winter Olympics.
