= Günther Bartnick =

East German biathlete

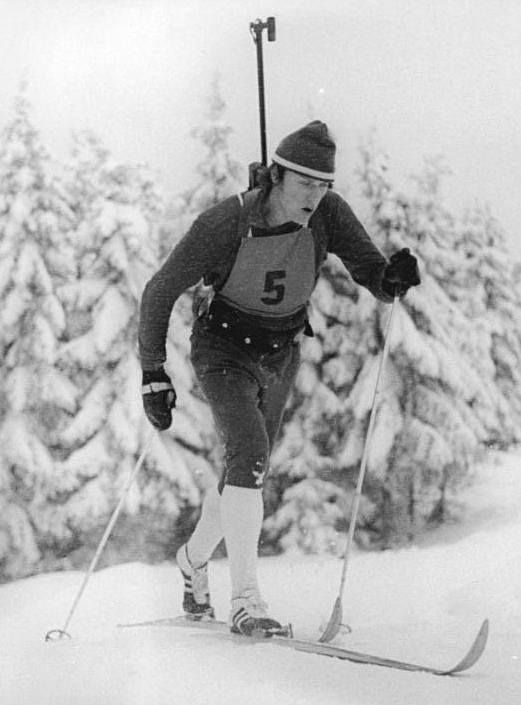
- Bartnik in 1975

Medal record

Representing East Germany

Men's biathlon

World Championships
Silver medal – second place	1974 Minsk	10 km sprint
Bronze medal – third place	1973 Lake Placid	4 x 7.5 km relay

Günther Bartnik (born 20 February 1949– 19 May 2023) was an East German biathlete. He won a bronze medal in relay at the Biathlon World Championships 1973 and a silver medal in the first World Championship 10 km sprint for men in 1974. He started for the SG Dynamo Zinnwald / Sportvereinigung (SV) Dynamo.

Bartnik died on 19 May 2023, at the age of 74.
