= Klaus Siebert =

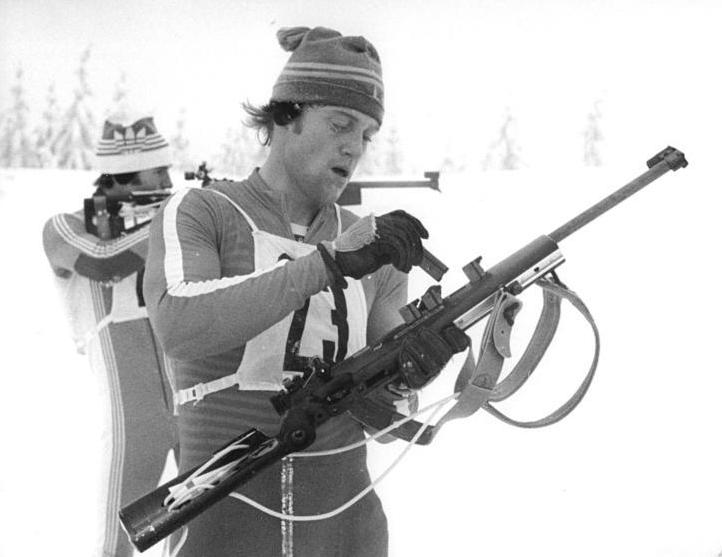
- Klaus Siebert in 1978.

Personal information
- Full name: Klaus Siebert
- Born: 29 April 1955 Schlettau, East Germany
- Died: 24 April 2016 (aged 60) Altenberg, Germany
- Website: klaussiebert.com

Sport

Professional information
- Sport: Biathlon
- Club: ASK Vorwärts Oberhof
- World Cup debut: 13 January 1978
- Retired: 30 March 1980

Olympic Games
- Teams: 1 (1980)
- Medals: 1 (0 gold)

World Championships
- Teams: 4 (1975, 1977, 1978, 1979)
- Medals: 6 (3 gold)

World Cup
- Seasons: 3 (1977/78–1979/80)
- Individual victories: 8
- Individual podiums: 16
- Overall titles: 1 (1978–79)
Medal record
Men's biathlon
Representing East Germany
Olympic Games
Silver medal – second place	1980 Lake Placid	4 × 7.5 km relay
World Championships
Gold medal – first place	1978 Hochfilzen	4 × 7.5 km relay
Gold medal – first place	1979 Ruhpolding	20 km individual
Gold medal – first place	1979 Ruhpolding	4 × 7.5 km relay
Bronze medal – third place	1975 Antholz-Anterselva	10 km sprint
Bronze medal – third place	1977 Lillehammer	4 × 7.5 km relay
Bronze medal – third place	1978 Hochfilzen	10 km sprint

Klaus Siebert (29 April 1955 – 24 April 2016) was a German biathlete and biathlon coach who raced for East Germany.

== Career ==
At the 1980 Olympics in Lake Placid, New York, Siebert won a silver medal on the relay with the East German relay team. In the Biathlon World Championships, Siebert earned two gold medals with the East German relay team in 1978 and 1979, and a bronze medal from 1977. He also garnered three individual medals including a gold medal from the 20 km in 1979 and two bronzes from the 10 km in 1975 and 1978.

After retiring from competition he became a coach. He coached in Germany, China and Belarus. He returned to his coaching role with the Belarusian national biathlon team in January 2012 after spending much of the previous year ill with cancer. However, Siebert stepped down from this role ahead of the 2014–15 season due to health issues.

Siebert died in Altenberg, Germany on 24 April 2016 after a long battle with cancer at age 60.

== Biathlon results ==
All results are sourced from the International Biathlon Union.

=== Olympic Games ===
1 medal (1 silver)

Event	Individual	Sprint	Relay
(United States) 1980 Lake Placid	15th	4th	Silver

=== World Championships ===
6 medals (3 gold, 3 bronze)

Event	Individual	Sprint	Relay
(Italy) 1975 Antholz-Anterselva	8th	Bronze	4th
(Norway) 1977 Lillehammer	24th	12th	Bronze
(Austria) 1978 Hochfilzen	7th	Bronze	Gold
(West Germany) 1979 Ruhpolding	Gold	17th	Gold

*During Olympic seasons competitions are only held for those events not included in the Olympic program.

=== Individual victories ===
8 victories (6 In, 2 Sp)

Season	Date	Location	Discipline	Level
1977–78; 3 victories (2 In, 1 Sp)	13 January 1978	(West Germany) Ruhpolding	20 km individual	Biathlon World Cup
1977–78; 3 victories (2 In, 1 Sp)	24 February 1978	(Italy) Antholz-Anterselva	10 km sprint	Biathlon World Cup
1977–78; 3 victories (2 In, 1 Sp)	1 April 1978	(Finland) Sodankylä	20 km individual	Biathlon World Cup
1978–79; 2 victories (1 In, 1 Sp)	28 January 1979	(West Germany) Ruhpolding	20 km individual	Biathlon World Championships
1978–79; 2 victories (1 In, 1 Sp)	31 March 1979	(Finland) Sodankylä	10 km sprint	Biathlon World Cup
1979–80; 3 victories (3 In)	19 January 1980	(West Germany) Ruhpolding	20 km individual	Biathlon World Cup
1979–80; 3 victories (3 In)	24 January 1980	(Italy) Antholz-Anterselva	20 km individual	Biathlon World Cup
1979–80; 3 victories (3 In)	20 March 1980	(Sweden) Hedenäset	20 km individual	Biathlon World Cup

*Results are from UIPMB and IBU races which include the Biathlon World Cup, Biathlon World Championships and the Winter Olympic Games.
