= Yoshiyuki Shirate =

Japanese biathlete (born 1947)

Personal information
- Nationality: Japanese
- Born: 21 March 1947 (age 78); Hokkaido, Japan

Sport
- Sport: Biathlon

Yoshiyuki Shirate (born 21 March 1947) is a Japanese biathlete. He competed in the relay event at the 1976 Winter Olympics.
