= Biathlon at the 1976 Winter Olympics =

Biathlon at the XII Olympic Winter Games
- Venue: Seefeld
- Dates: 6–13 February
- Competitors: 74 from 18 nations

Biathlon at the 1976 Winter Olympics consisted of two biathlon events, held at Seefeld. The events began on 6 February and ended on 13 February 1976.

== Medal summary ==
Three nations won medals in biathlon, the Soviet Union leading the medal table with three medals (2 gold, 1 bronze). Nikolay Kruglov led the individual medal table, winning the individual race, and adding a gold medal in the relay.

=== Medal table ===
Rank	Nation	Gold	Silver	Bronze	Total
1	Soviet Union	2	0	1	3
2	Finland	0	2	0	2
3	East Germany	0	0	1	1
Totals (3 entries)		2	2	2	6

=== Events ===
Event	Gold		Silver		Bronze	
Individual	Nikolay Kruglov; Soviet Union	1:14:12.26	Heikki Ikola; Finland	1:15:54.10	Aleksandr Elizarov; Soviet Union	1:16:05.57
Relay	Soviet Union; Aleksandr Elizarov; Ivan Biakov; Nikolay Kruglov; Aleksandr Tikhonov	1:57:55.64	Finland; Henrik Flöjt; Esko Saira; Juhani Suutarinen; Heikki Ikola	2:01:45.58	East Germany; Karl-Heinz Menz; Frank Ullrich; Manfred Beer; Manfred Geyer	2:04:08.61

== Participating nations ==
Eighteen nations sent biathletes to compete in the events. Below is a list of the competing nations; in parentheses are the number of national competitors. Bulgaria and Chinese Taipei (as Republic of China) made their Olympic biathlon debuts.

- Austria (4)
- Bulgaria (2)
- Finland (4)
- France (5)
- West Germany (6)
- Great Britain (4)
- East Germany (5)
- Italy (4)
- Japan (5)
- Norway (4)
- Poland (4)
- Republic of China (2)
- Romania (4)
- Switzerland (3)
- Sweden (4)
- Czechoslovakia (5)
- Soviet Union (4)
- United States (5)
