= Torsten Wadman =

Swedish biathlete (born 1947)

Personal information
- Nationality: Swedish
- Born: 30 June 1947 (age 77); Torsby, Sweden

Sport
- Sport: Biathlon

Torsten Wadman (born 30 June 1947) is a Swedish biathlete. He competed at the 1972 Winter Olympics and the 1976 Winter Olympics.
