= Nicole Resch =

Nicole Resch (born 1975) is a German jurist and former secretary general of the International Biathlon Union (IBU). She left her position during a corruption scandal investigation of her and the IBU President.

== Biography ==
Resch started cross-country skiing at the age of eight years and switched to biathlon at the age of 12 years being trained by Manfred Geyer. She ended her sports life early and studied law at the Julius Maximilian University of Würzburg. After the second state examination she underwent a special alumni program which focussed on the Olympic sports in the field of sport management and sport law.

She started her career at the IBU as assistant of secretary general Michael Geistlinger in 2007. After his leave she became his commissionary successor as chief of the IBU office. She was secretary general of the IBU from 1 December 2008.

In 2018 the IBU underwent a corruption scandal and she was accused of accepting bribes from Russia. She and the IBU President left their positions that year after Austrian and Norwegian authorities announced criminal investigations into their conduct. According to a January 2021 report commissioned by biathlon’s new leadership and resulting from a two-year investigation, she improperly defended Russia's athletes, assailed its critics, and blocked efforts to root out doping by Russia's teams.
