= Piesendorf =

- Municipality
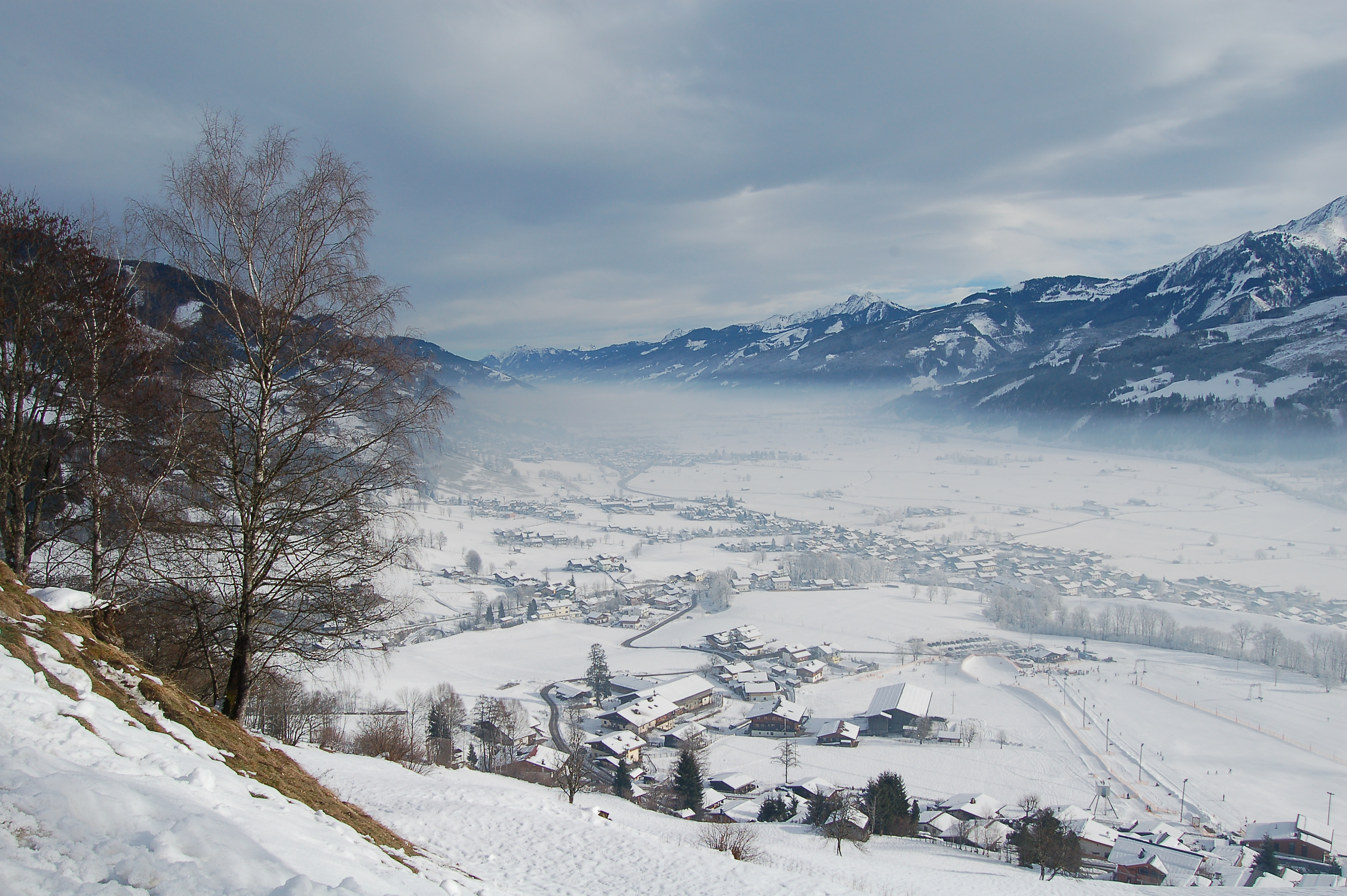
- View of Piesendorf and the Hohe Tauern National park

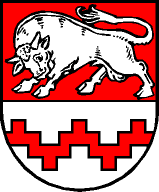
- Coat of arms

- Location within Austria
- Coordinates: 47°16′00″N 12°43′00″E
- Country: Austria
- State: Salzburg
- District: Zell am See

Government
  - Mayor: Johann Warter (ÖVP)

Area
  - Total: 50.97 km^{2} (19.68 sq mi)
- Elevation: 785 m (2,575 ft)

Population (2018-01-01)
  - Total: 3,790
  - Density: 74.4/km^{2} (193/sq mi)
- Time zone: UTC+1 (CET)
  - Summer (DST): UTC+2 (CEST)
- Postal code: 5721
- Area code: 06549
- Vehicle registration: ZE
- Website: www.piesendorf.at

Piesendorf is a municipality in the district of Zell am See (Pinzgau region), in the state of Salzburg in Austria. It lies in the Kitzbühel Alps between Kitzbühel and Zell am See. Due to its location between the ski resorts of Zell am See, Kitzbühel and the Hohe Tauern National Park with Austria's highest mountains, it has become centered on tourism. Piesendorf lies directly across from the Kitzsteinhorn and the Großglockner, the latter being Austria's tallest peak.

== Population ==
Piesendorf has been growing at a fast rate since the 1900s, surpassing some of its neighboring towns in population.

Historical population
Year	Pop.	±%
1869	1,352	—
1880	1,389	+2.7%
1890	1,426	+2.7%
1900	1,487	+4.3%
1910	1,504	+1.1%
1923	1,464	−2.7%
1934	1,543	+5.4%
1939	1,581	+2.5%
1951	1,946	+23.1%
1961	1,909	−1.9%
1971	2,094	+9.7%
1981	2,601	+24.2%
1991	2,997	+15.2%
2001	3,481	+16.1%
2011	3,764	+8.1%
2021	3,816	+1.4%
2021	3,843	+0.7%

== Places of Interest ==
- Walchen castle
- St. Laurentius Church, built in the town center in the 14th century.
- Walchen Church, built in the 13th century.
- St. Leonhard Church, built in 1716.
- Golfclub Zell am See-Kaprun-Saalbach, split between the municipalities of Piesendorf and Zell am See.

== Transportation ==
The Pinzgauer Lokalbahn local rail service connects Piesendorf to Zell am See. The town is served by multiple public and private bus lines.

== Personalities ==
- Alfred Eder (b. 1953), biathlete
