= Marius Falquy =

French biathlete (born 1946)

Personal information
- Nationality: French
- Born: 13 March 1946 (age 79)

Sport
- Sport: Biathlon

Marius Falquy (born 13 March 1946) is a French biathlete. He competed in the relay event at the 1976 Winter Olympics.
