= Nikolay Kruglov =

Soviet biathlete (born 1950)

Personal information
- Full name: Nikolay Konstantinovich Kruglov
- Born: 31 January 1950 (age 76) Krasnyy Mys, Balakhninsky District, Gorky Oblast, RSFSR, Soviet Union

Sport

Professional information
- Sport: Biathlon
- World Cup debut: 13 January 1978

Olympic Games
- Teams: 1 (1976)
- Medals: 2 (2 gold)

World Championships
- Teams: 6 (1974, 1975, 1976, 1977, 1978, 1979)
- Medals: 8 (3 gold)

World Cup
- Seasons: 2 (1977/78–1978/79)
- Individual victories: 1
- Individual podiums: 3
Medal record
Men's biathlon
Representing Soviet Union
Olympic Games
Gold medal – first place	1976 Innsbruck	20 km individual
Gold medal – first place	1976 Innsbruck	4 × 7.5 km relay
World Championships
Gold medal – first place	1974 Minsk	4 × 7.5 km relay
Gold medal – first place	1975 Antholz-Anterselva	10 km sprint
Gold medal – first place	1977 Lillehammer	4 × 7.5 km relay
Silver medal – second place	1975 Antholz-Anterselva	20 km individual
Silver medal – second place	1975 Antholz-Anterselva	4 × 7.5 km relay
Silver medal – second place	1977 Lillehammer	10 km sprint
Bronze medal – third place	1976 Antholz-Anterselva	10 km sprint
Bronze medal – third place	1979 Ruhpolding	4 × 7.5 km relay

Nikolay Konstantinovich Kruglov (Russian: Никола́й Константи́нович Кругло́в; born 31 January 1950) is a former Soviet Union biathlete. At the 1976 Olympics in Innsbruck he won gold medals in the 20 km individual and with the men's relay team. He became world champion in the sprint event at the 1975 World Championships in Antholz.

His son, Nikolay Kruglov, Jr., also became a biathlete.

== Biathlon results ==
All results are sourced from the International Biathlon Union.

=== Olympic Games ===
2 medals (2 gold)

Event	Individual	Relay
(Austria) 1976 Innsbruck	Gold	Gold

=== World Championships ===
8 medals (3 gold, 3 silver, 2 bronze)

Event	Individual	Sprint	Relay
(Soviet Union) 1974 Minsk	17th	6th	Gold
(Italy) 1975 Antholz-Anterselva	Silver	Gold	Silver
(Italy) 1976 Antholz-Anterselva	—N/a	Bronze	—N/a
(Norway) 1977 Lillehammer	6th	Silver	Gold
(Austria) 1978 Hochfilzen	5th	22nd	4th
(West Germany) 1979 Ruhpolding	17th	14th	Bronze

*During Olympic seasons competitions are only held for those events not included in the Olympic program.

=== Individual victories ===
1 victory (1 In)

Season	Date	Location	Discipline	Level
1977–78; 1 victory (1 In)	25 March 1978	(Soviet Union) Murmansk	20 km individual	Biathlon World Cup

*Results are from UIPMB and IBU races which include the Biathlon World Cup, Biathlon World Championships and the Winter Olympic Games.
