= Biathlon World Championships 1975 =

Sports competition in Antholz-Anterselva, Italy

- Host city: Anterselva
- Country: Italy
- Events: 3
- Opening: 14 February 1975
- Closing: 16 February 1975

The 14th Biathlon World Championships were held in 1975 in Antholz-Anterselva, Italy.

== Men's results ==
=== 20 km individual ===
Medal	Name	Nation	Penalties	Result
1st place, gold medalist(s)	Heikki Ikola	FIN	2	1:13:52.3
2nd place, silver medalist(s)	Nikolay Kruglov	URS	3	1:14:31.3
3rd place, bronze medalist(s)	Esko Saira	FIN	3	1:15:08.8

=== 10 km sprint ===
Medal	Name	Nation	Penalties	Result
1st place, gold medalist(s)	Nikolay Kruglov	URS	1	35:27.7
2nd place, silver medalist(s)	Aleksandr Elizarov	URS	1	35:56.2
3rd place, bronze medalist(s)	Klaus Siebert	GDR	2	36:27.4

=== 4 × 7.5 km relay ===
Medal	Name	Nation	Penalties	Result
1st place, gold medalist(s)	Finland Henrik Flöjt; Simo Halonen; Juhani Suutarinen; Heikki Ikola	FIN		
2nd place, silver medalist(s)	Soviet Union Alexander Tikhonov; Aleksandr Elizarov; Alexander Ushakov; Nikolay Kruglov	URS		
3rd place, bronze medalist(s)	Poland Jan Szpunar; Andrzej Rapacz; Ludwik Zięba; Wojciech Truchan	POL		

== Medal table ==
Place	Nation	1st place, gold medalist(s)	2nd place, silver medalist(s)	3rd place, bronze medalist(s)	Total
1	Finland	2	0	1	3
2	Soviet Union	1	3	0	4
3	East Germany	0	0	1	1
3	Poland	0	0	1	1
