= Olavi Köppä =

Finnish speed skater (1951–2025)

Personal information
- Nationality: Finnish
- Born: 16 May 1951 Kangasala, Finland
- Died: 5 October 2025 (aged 74)

Sport
- Sport: Speed skating

Olavi Köppä (16 May 1951 – 5 October 2025) was a Finnish speed skater. He competed in three events at the 1976 Winter Olympics.
