= Alexander Tikhonov =

Soviet biathlete (born 1947)

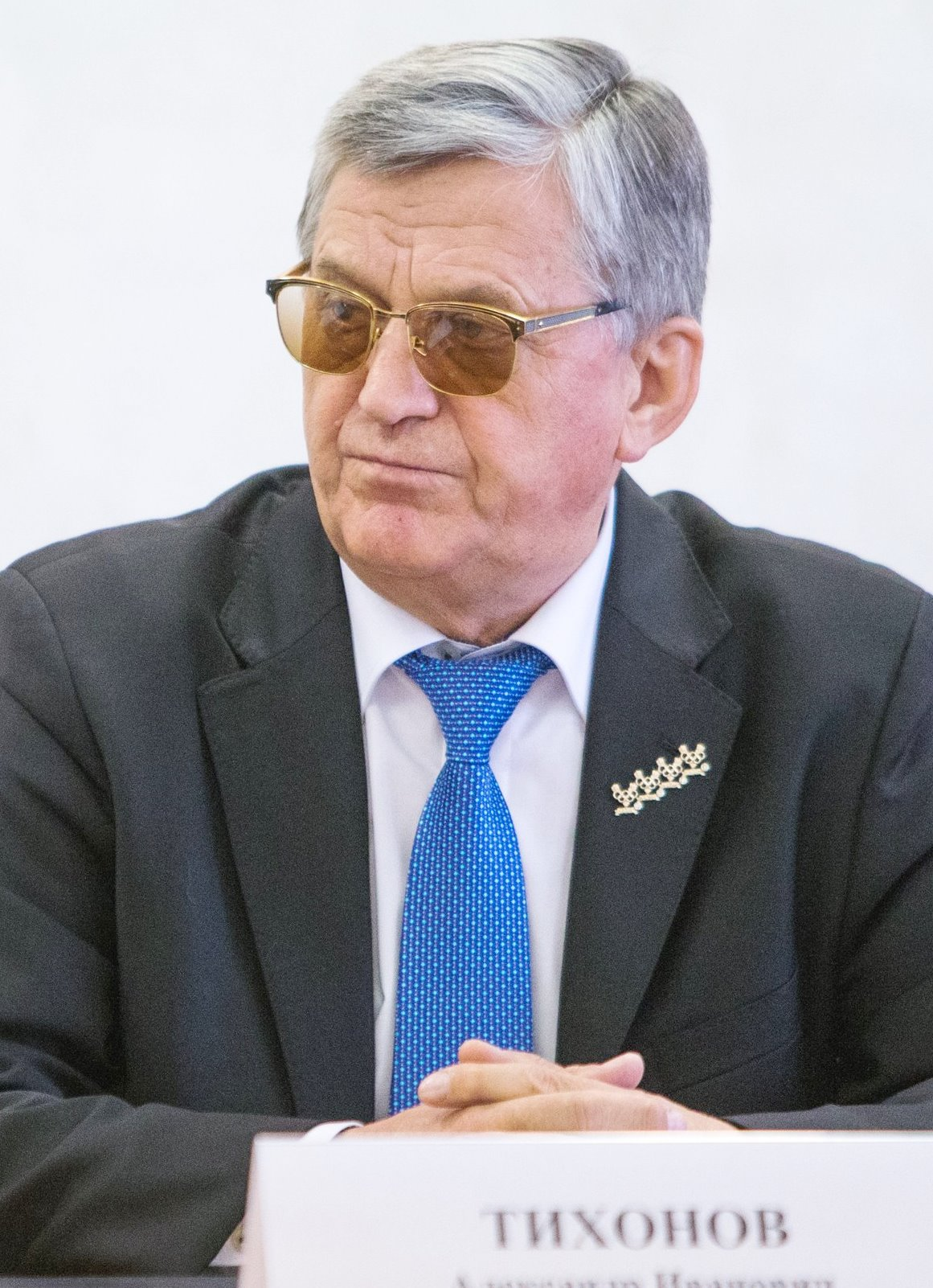
- Tikhonov in 2015

Personal information
- Full name: Alexander Ivanovich Tikhonov
- Born: 2 January 1947 (age 79) Uyskoye, Kolkhozny, Russian SFSR, Soviet Union
- Height: 1.73 m (5 ft 8 in)

Sport

Professional information
- Sport: Biathlon
- World Cup debut: 13 January 1978

Olympic Games
- Teams: 4 (1968, 1972, 1976, 1980)
- Medals: 5 (4 gold)

World Championships
- Teams: 11 (1967, 1969, 1970, 1971, 1973, 1974, 1975, 1976, 1977, 1978, 1979)
- Medals: 17 (11 gold)

World Cup
- Seasons: 3 (1977/78–1979/80)
- Individual victories: 2
- Individual podiums: 4
Medal record
Men's biathlon
Representing Soviet Union
Olympic Games
Gold medal – first place	1968 Grenoble	4 × 7.5 km relay
Gold medal – first place	1972 Sapporo	4 × 7.5 km relay
Gold medal – first place	1976 Innsbruck	4 × 7.5 km relay
Gold medal – first place	1980 Lake Placid	4 × 7.5 km relay
Silver medal – second place	1968 Grenoble	20 km individual
World Championships
Gold medal – first place	1969 Zakopane	20 km individual
Gold medal – first place	1969 Zakopane	4 × 7.5 km relay
Gold medal – first place	1970 Östersund	20 km individual
Gold medal – first place	1970 Östersund	4 × 7.5 km relay
Gold medal – first place	1971 Hämeenlinna	4 × 7.5 km relay
Gold medal – first place	1973 Lake Placid	20 km individual
Gold medal – first place	1973 Lake Placid	4 × 7.5 km relay
Gold medal – first place	1974 Minsk	4 × 7.5 km relay
Gold medal – first place	1976 Antholz-Anterselva	10 km sprint
Gold medal – first place	1977 Lillehammer	10 km sprint
Gold medal – first place	1977 Lillehammer	4 × 7.5 km relay
Silver medal – second place	1967 Altenberg	4 × 7.5 km relay
Silver medal – second place	1971 Hämeenlinna	20 km individual
Silver medal – second place	1975 Antholz-Anterselva	4 × 7.5 km relay
Silver medal – second place	1979 Ruhpolding	20 km individual
Bronze medal – third place	1977 Lillehammer	20 km individual
Bronze medal – third place	1979 Ruhpolding	4 × 7.5 km relay

Alexander Ivanovich Tikhonov (Russian: Александр Иванович Тихонов; born 2 January 1947) is a former Soviet-Russian biathlete. He is a four-time Olympic champion, winning his gold medals in relays.

On 23 July 2007, he was found guilty of conspiracy to commit murder and sentenced to three years of imprisonment, but he was amnestied immediately and did not spend any time in prison.

== Life and career ==
Tikhonov trained at Dynamo in Novosibirsk. He won nine world championship biathlon gold medals and four Olympic gold medals. He lacks an individual Olympic gold medal in his cupboard, but took part in the gold medal relay winning teams in 1968, 1972, 1976, and 1980. W.D. Frank, author of Everyone to Skis! Skiing in Russia and the Rise of Soviet Biathlon, wrote in his book that Tikhonov was a member of the KGB.

In 1999 he ran for election to become governor of the Moscow region, but Tikhonov lost in the first round.

After Tikhonov was charged with conspiracy to commit murder, he fled and lived in Austria for several years in the early 2000s.

During the 2022 Winter Olympics in Beijing, when biathlete Valeria Vasnetsova complained about the quality of food she was receiving at her hotel, Tikhonov said: "I would cut off Vasnetsova's tongue for such complaints. At the 1980 Olympics, we lived in America like in a prison and nobody complained."

In September 2023, he publicly supported Russia's attack on Ukraine. Tikhonov volunteered to serve in the "special military operation" in Ukraine in 2023.

=== International Biathlon Union; bribery ===
Tikhonov led the Russian Biathlon Union from 1995 to 2008, soon after he was convicted of trying to have a politician killed.

In May 2002, after Tikhonov fled to Austria to avoid trial for conspiracy to commit murder, he was chosen as vice president of the International Biathlon Union (IBU), the sport's governing body. He held that position until 2010.

A two-year investigation by the IBU found that Tikhonov offered a bribe of a jewelry box with valuable jewelry to IBU Secretary General Nicole Resch, "to induce her not to pursue suspected doping by Russian biathletes in 2008/2009". The doping cases were three erythropoietin (EPO) cases the IBU had brought against three Russian national team biathletes, Ekaterina Iourieva, Albina Akhatova and Dmitry Yaroshenko.

In 2010, he was the second in command at the IBU, and vice president of the Russian Biathlon Union. His presence at the 2010 Winter Olympics troubled many of biathlon's leaders, who said Tikhonov's conviction for trying to arrange a murder damaged the image of the sport. Dr. James Carrabre, a Canadian member of the IBU executive board, said: "It's not good for us, it's not good for our sponsors, to have this perception that maybe we have someone who is a criminal on our board." IBU President Anders Besseberg said Tikhonov's conviction and amnesty created a "difficult and tricky" situation.

The independent External Review Commission of the IBU concluded that Tikhonov attempted to buy votes at the 2014 IBU Congress elections. It also concluded that generally he was not a reliable witness.

In 2018, he was a Georgian delegate for the IBU Congress. He said he would make a congressional proposal that neither Baiba Broka nor Olle Dahlin deserved to be the IBU President. Broka said Tikhonov "always finds only bad things in other people, especially if they candidate for the post of President of the IBU. The fact that he will represent Georgia, raises question why he is not representing his own country".

== Conspiracy to commit murder ==
In 2000, he was accused by prosecutors of participating in planning the assassination of western Siberian Kemerovo Oblast governor Aman Tuleyev. According to the prosecution, a businessman named Mikhail Zhivilo and his company MIKOM had a business conflict with Tuleyev, and Zhivilo decided to organize Tuleyev's murder as revenge. Zhivilo knew Tikhonov and allegedly asked him to arrange the murder of Tuleyev. Tikhonov put Zhivilo in touch with his younger brother, Viktor Tikhonov, to help arrange the murder. His younger brother hired two potential killers from an organized crime group to commit the murder-–Vladimir Kharchenko and Sergey Nikanorov, who Russian media reported were promised $700,000. Kharchenko and Nikanorov instead went to the FSB, and told them about the murder plans.

Viktor Tikhonov was convicted in 2002, and sentenced to four years of imprisonment. He served his term in a maximum security prison.

Alexander Tikhonov, was charged and arrested in August 2020, but was released from custody a month later when he claimed he was unwell—with an order to remain in Russia. However, he disobeyed the order and fled the country for Austria and Germany, where he lived for several years. He was indicted separately from the other accused. On 23 July 2007, he was tried and found guilty of conspiracy to commit murder, and sentenced to three years of imprisonment. However, he was amnestied immediately due to his decorated Olympic career, and did not spend any time in prison. Leonid Tyagachev, president of the Russian Olympic Committee from 2001 to 2010, approved of his amnesty, opining: "The person who has devoted all his life to Russia can't be guilty of anything."

== Honours and awards ==
- Order of the Red Star (1969)
- Order of the Red Banner of Labour (1976)
- Order of Lenin (1980)
- Order of Friendship (1999)
- Medal "For Labour Valour"
- Medal "For Distinguished Labour"

== Biathlon results ==
All results are sourced from the International Biathlon Union.

=== Olympic Games ===
5 medals (4 gold, 1 silver)

Event	Individual	Sprint	Relay
(France) 1968 Grenoble	Silver	—N/a	Gold
(Japan) 1972 Sapporo	4th	—N/a	Gold
(Austria) 1976 Innsbruck	5th	—N/a	Gold
(United States) 1980 Lake Placid	—	9th	Gold

*Sprint was added as an event in 1980.

=== World Championships ===
17 medals (11 gold, 4 silver, 2 bronze)

Event	Individual	Sprint	Relay
(East Germany) 1967 Altenberg	9th	—N/a	Silver
(Polish People's Republic) 1969 Zakopane	Gold	—N/a	Gold
(Sweden) 1970 Östersund	Gold	—N/a	Gold
(Finland) 1971 Hämeenlinna	Silver	—N/a	Gold
(United States) 1973 Lake Placid	Gold	—N/a	Gold
(Soviet Union) 1974 Minsk	5th	11th	Gold
(Italy) 1975 Antholz-Anterselva	7th	6th	Silver
(Italy) 1976 Antholz-Anterselva	—N/a	Gold	—N/a
(Norway) 1977 Lillehammer	Bronze	Gold	Gold
(Austria) 1978 Hochfilzen	17th	17th	4th
(West Germany) 1979 Ruhpolding	Silver	6th	Bronze

*During Olympic seasons competitions are only held for those events not included in the Olympic program.
**Sprint was added as an event in 1974.

=== Individual victories ===
2 victories (1 In, 1 Sp)

Season	Date	Location	Discipline	Level
1978–79; 2 victories (1 In, 1 Sp)	21 January 1979	(Italy) Antholz-Anterselva	10 km sprint	Biathlon World Cup
1978–79; 2 victories (1 In, 1 Sp)	6 April 1979	(Norway) Bardufoss	20 km individual	Biathlon World Cup

*Results are from UIPMB and IBU races which include the Biathlon World Cup, Biathlon World Championships and the Winter Olympic Games.

== See also ==
- List of multiple Olympic gold medalists in one event
