= Henrik Flöjt =

Finnish biathlete

Medal record

Representing Finland

Men's biathlon

Olympic Games
Silver medal – second place	1976 Innsbruck	4 × 7.5 km relay

World Championships
Gold medal – first place	1975 Antholz-Anterselva	4 × 7.5 km relay
Silver medal – second place	1974 Minsk	4 × 7.5 km relay

Henrik Flöjt (May 24, 1952, Kajaani – September 26, 2005) was a Finnish biathlete, world champion and Olympic medalist. He received a silver medal in 4 x 7.5 km relay at the 1976 Winter Olympics in Innsbruck. He became world champion in 1975 with the Finnish relay team. His brother Heikki Flöjt was also a biathlete.
