= Biathlon at the 1972 Winter Olympics =

Biathlon at the XI Olympic Winter Games
- Venue: Makomanai Biathlon Site
- Dates: 9–11 February
- Competitors: 62 from 14 nations

Biathlon at the 1972 Winter Olympics consisted of two biathlon events, held at Makomanai Biathlon Site. The events began on 9 February and ended on 11 February 1972.

== Medal summary ==
Five nations won medals in biathlon, the Soviet Union and Norway leading the medal table with one gold medal each, while East Germany were the only country to win more than one medal. Hansjörg Knauthe, who was part of both East German medals, was the only athlete to win more than one medal.

=== Medal table ===
Rank	Nation	Gold	Silver	Bronze	Total
1	Norway	1	0	0	1
1	Soviet Union	1	0	0	1
3	East Germany	0	1	1	2
4	Finland	0	1	0	1
5	Sweden	0	0	1	1
Totals (5 entries)		2	2	2	6

=== Events ===
Event	Gold		Silver		Bronze	
Individual	Magnar Solberg; Norway	1:15:55.50	Hansjörg Knauthe; East Germany	1:16:07.60	Lars-Göran Arwidson; Sweden	1:16:27.03
Relay	Soviet Union; Aleksandr Tikhonov; Rinnat Safin; Ivan Biakov; Viktor Mamatov	1:51:44.92	Finland; Esko Saira; Juhani Suutarinen; Heikki Ikola; Mauri Röppänen	1:54:37.25	East Germany; Hansjörg Knauthe; Joachim Meischner; Dieter Speer; Horst Koschka	1:54:57.67

== Participating nations ==
Fourteen nations sent biathletes to compete in Sapporo. Below is a list of the competing nations; in parentheses are the number of national competitors. Italy made its Olympic biathlon debut.

- Finland (5)
- France (5)
- West Germany (2)
- Great Britain (4)
- East Germany (5)
- Italy (5)
- Japan (4)
- Norway (5)
- Poland (5)
- Romania (5)
- Sweden (4)
- Czechoslovakia (5)
- Soviet Union (4)
- United States (4)
