= Biathlon World Championships 1974 =

Sports competition in Minsk, Belarus

- Host city: Minsk, Byelorussian SSR
- Country: USSR
- Events: 3
- Opening: 27 February 1974
- Closing: 1 March 1974

The 13th Biathlon World Championships were held in 1974 in Minsk, Belarus, at that time part of the Soviet Union.

== Men's results ==
=== 20 km individual ===
Medal	Name	Nation	Penalties	Result
1st place, gold medalist(s)	Juhani Suutarinen	FIN	1	1:12:04.7
2nd place, silver medalist(s)	Gheorghe Gârniță	ROU	1	1:13:28.9
3rd place, bronze medalist(s)	Tor Svendsberget	NOR	3	1:13:37.1

=== 10 km sprint ===
Medal	Name	Nation	Penalties	Result
1st place, gold medalist(s)	Juhani Suutarinen	FIN		37:42.43
2nd place, silver medalist(s)	Günther Bartnick	GDR		38:30.73
3rd place, bronze medalist(s)	Torsten Wadman	SWE		38:44.03

=== 4 × 7.5 km relay ===
Medal	Name	Nation	Penalties	Result
1st place, gold medalist(s)	Soviet Union Alexander Tikhonov; Alexander Ushakov; Nikolay Kruglov; Juri Kolmakov	URS		2:02:48.75
2nd place, silver medalist(s)	Finland Simo Halonen; Carl-Henrik Flöjt; Juhani Suutarinen; Heikki Ikola	FIN		2:04:08.89
3rd place, bronze medalist(s)	Norway Kjell Hovda; Kåre Hovda; Terje Hanssen; Tor Svendsberget	NOR		2:05:15.35

== Medal table ==
Place	Nation	1st place, gold medalist(s)	2nd place, silver medalist(s)	3rd place, bronze medalist(s)	Total
1	Finland	2	1	0	3
2	Soviet Union	1	0	0	1
3	East Germany	0	1	0	1
3	Romania	0	1	0	1
5	Norway	0	0	2	2
6	Sweden	0	0	1	1
