= Aleksandr Elizarov =

Soviet biathlete (born 1952)

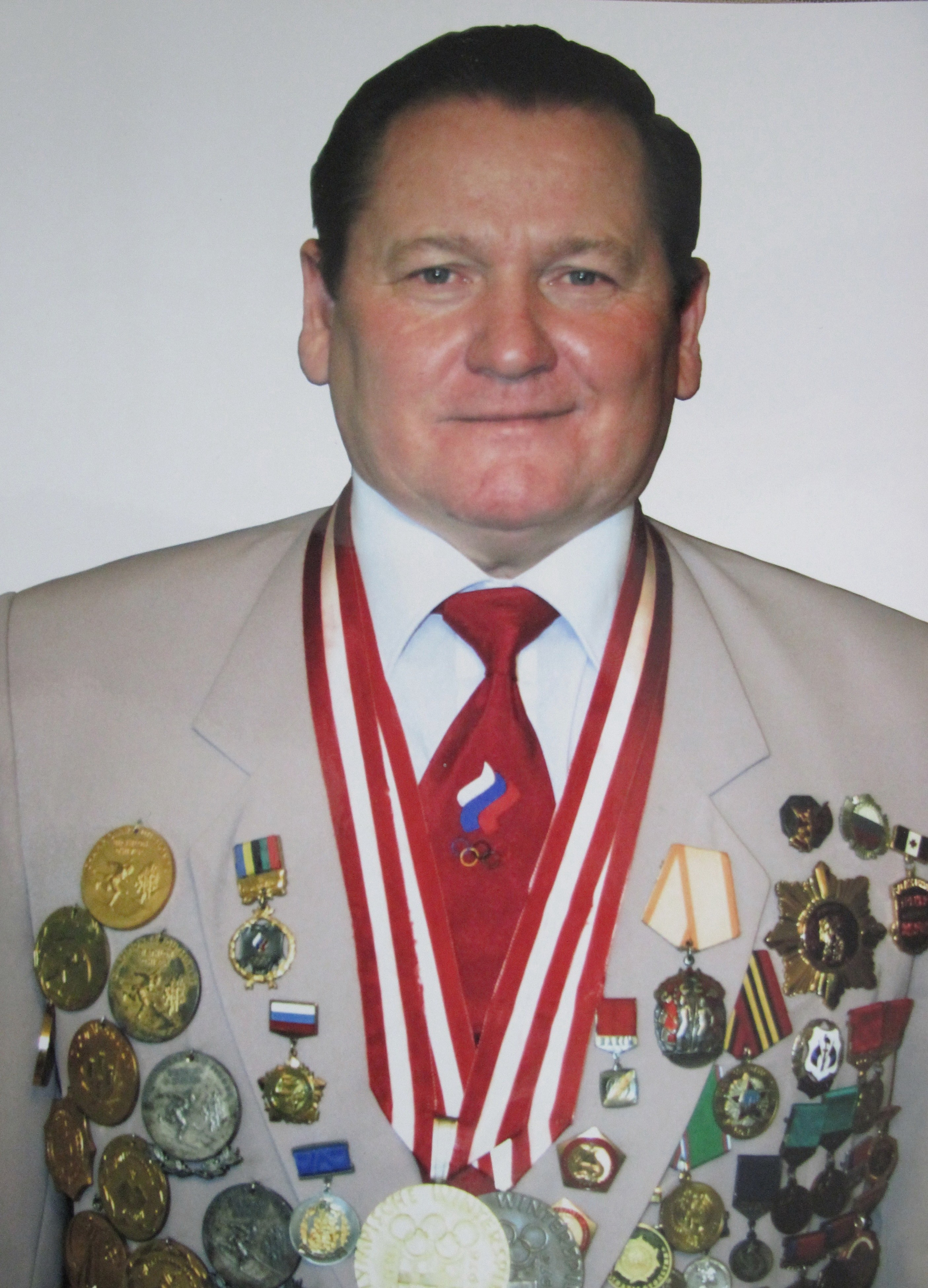

Personal information
- Full name: Aleksandr Matveyevich Elizarov
- Born: 7 March 1952 (age 74) Vyazovka, Penza Oblast, RSFSR, Soviet Union

Sport

Professional information
- Sport: Biathlon

Olympic Games
- Teams: 1 (1976)
- Medals: 2 (1 gold)

World Championships
- Teams: 3 (1975, 1976, 1977)
- Medals: 4 (1 gold)

World Cup
- Seasons: 1 (1977/78)
- Individual victories: 0
- Individual podiums: 0
Medal record
Men's biathlon
Representing Soviet Union
Olympic Games
Gold medal – first place	1976 Innsbruck	4 × 7.5 km relay
Bronze medal – third place	1976 Innsbruck	20 km individual
World Championships
Gold medal – first place	1977 Lillehammer	4 × 7.5 km relay
Silver medal – second place	1975 Antholz-Anterselva	10 km sprint
Silver medal – second place	1975 Antholz-Anterselva	4 × 7.5 km relay
Silver medal – second place	1976 Antholz-Anterselva	10 km sprint

Aleksandr Matveyevich Elizarov (also Yelizarov) (Russian: Александр Матвеевич Елизаров; born 7 March 1952) is a former Soviet biathlete. At the 1976 Winter Olympics in Innsbruck, he won a gold medal with the Soviet relay team, and an individual bronze medal.

== Biathlon results ==
All results are sourced from the International Biathlon Union.

=== Olympic Games ===
2 medals (1 gold, 1 bronze)

Event	Individual	Relay
(Austria) 1976 Innsbruck	Bronze	Gold

=== World Championships ===
4 medals (1 gold, 3 silver)

Event	Individual	Sprint	Relay
(Italy) 1975 Antholz-Anterselva	—	Silver	Silver
(Italy) 1976 Antholz-Anterselva	—N/a	Silver	—N/a
(Norway) 1977 Lillehammer	—	17th	Gold

*During Olympic seasons competitions are only held for those events not included in the Olympic program.
