= Reijo Laksola =

Finnish ice hockey player

Personal information
- Nationality: Finnish
- Born: 10 August 1952; Seinäjoki, Finland
- Died: 29 December 2007 (aged 55)

Sport
- Sport: Ice hockey

Reijo Laksola (10 August 1952 – 29 December 2007) was a Finnish ice hockey player. He competed in the men's tournament at the 1976 Winter Olympics.
