= Manfred Geyer =

East German biathlete (born 1951)

Medal record

Representing East Germany

Men's biathlon

Olympic Games
Bronze medal – third place	1976 Innsbruck	4 x 7.5 km relay

World Championships
Bronze medal – third place	1973 Lake Placid	4 x 7.5 km relay
Bronze medal – third place	1977 Lillehammer	4 x 7.5 km relay

Manfred Geyer (born May 23, 1951, in Altenfeld) is a former German biathlete and current coach.

He won the bronze medal with the GDR relay team at the 1976 Olympic Games in Innsbruck together with Karl-Heinz Menz, Frank Ullrich and Manfred Beer. From 1976 to 2003, Geyer was the women's base coach in Oberhof, where he paved the way to the world elite for Kati Wilhelm, Katrin Apel and Andrea Henkel, among others. From 2004 to 2010, Geyer was responsible for the development of biathlon in Switzerland as coach of the Swiss national biathlon team. His successor was Steffen Hauswald. During his tenure, the Swiss men improved from 19th to eighth place in the national rankings. Top ten results were achieved on many occasions, with Matthias Simmen and Thomas Frei two athletes reaching podium places. In the women's category, too, Selina Gasparin was the first biathlete to be brought into the extended world elite. Since the summer of 2010, he has been looking after South Korea’s biathletes.

== External ==
- Manfred Geyer at Olympedia
