= Karl-Heinz Menz =

German former biathlete (born 1949)

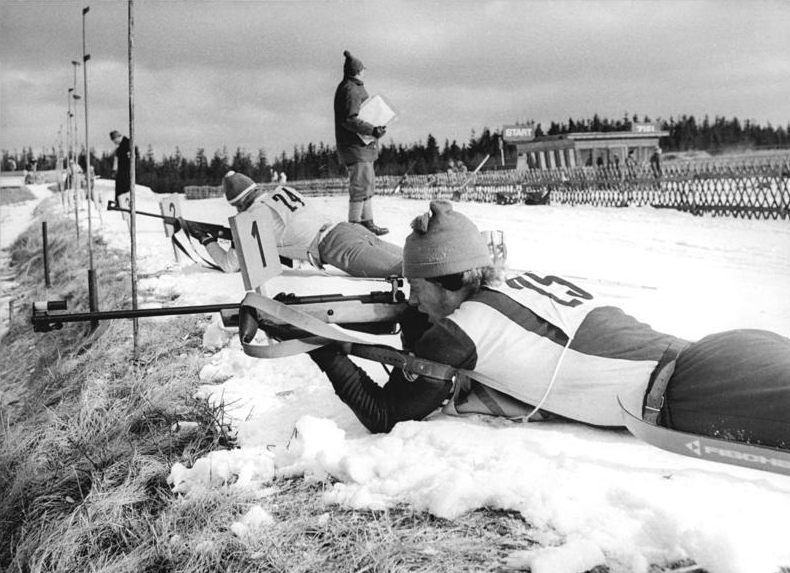
- Karl-Heinz Menz (No. 24 in the background) in 1976

Medal record

Men's biathlon

Representing East Germany
Bronze medal – third place	1976 Innsbruck	4x7.5 km relay

Karl-Heinz Menz (born 17 December 1949) is a German former biathlete who competed in the 1976 Winter Olympics.
