= Hansjörg Knauthe =

East German biathlete

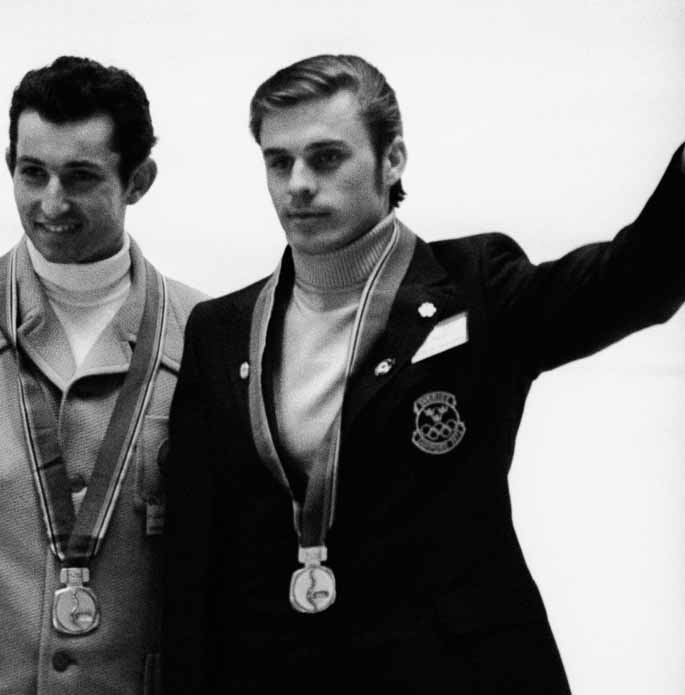
- Knauthe (left) at the 1972 Olympics

Personal information
- Born: 13 July 1944 (age 81) Geising, Germany
- Height: 178 cm (5 ft 10 in)
- Weight: 72 kg (159 lb)

Sport
- Sport: Biathlon
- Club: SG Dynamo Zinnwald / Sportvereinigung (SV) Dynamo.
Medal record
Representing East Germany
Olympic Games
Silver medal – second place	1972 Sapporo	20 km
Bronze medal – third place	1972 Sapporo	4 × 7.5 km
World Championships
Bronze medal – third place	1970 Östersund	4 × 7.5 km

Hansjörg Knauthe (born 13 July 1944) is a retired East German biathlete. He won an individual silver and a team bronze medals at the 1972 Olympics. At the world championships he won a team bronze in 1970. He held the individual national title in 1969 and placed second in 1966, 1970 and 1971. Knauthe had a diploma of a sports teacher, but after retiring from competitions, he worked as a personal and property protector at the Saxon State Chancellery.
