= Ludwik Zięba =

Polish biathlete (born 1953)

Personal information
- Nationality: Polish
- Born: 5 March 1953 (age 72); Koniówka, Poland

Sport
- Sport: Biathlon

Ludwik Zięba (born 5 March 1953) is a Polish biathlete. He competed in the relay event at the 1976 Winter Olympics.
