= Lars-Göran Arwidson =

Swedish biathlete (born 1946)

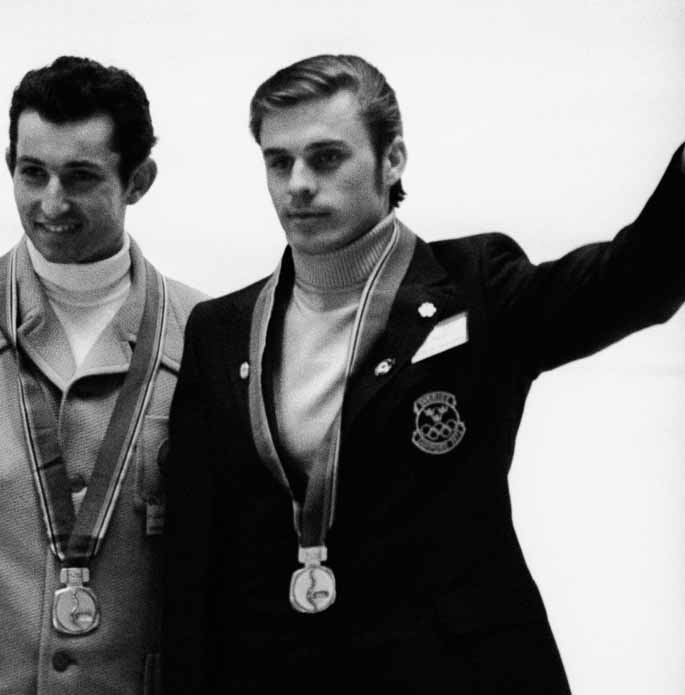
- Arwidson (right) at the 1972 Olympics

Personal information
- Born: 4 April 1946 (age 80) Malung, Sweden

Sport
- Sport: Biathlon
- Club: Lima SKG
Medal record
Representing Sweden
Olympic Games
Bronze medal – third place	1968 Grenoble	4 × 7.5 km
Bronze medal – third place	1972 Sapporo	20 km

Lars-Göran Arwidson (born 4 April 1946) is a Swedish biathlete who competed at the 1968, 1972 and 1976 Winter Olympics.

At the 1968 Winter Olympics in Grenoble, he won a bronze medal in the 4×7.5 km relay, and finished 17th in the 20 km individual race. At the 1972 Winter Olympics in Sapporo, he won a bronze medal in the 20 km, and finished 5th in the relay.

He is the father of the Olympic biathlete Tobias Arwidson.
