= Biathlon World Championships 1977 =

Sports competition in Vingrom, Norway

- Host city: Vingrom
- Country: Norway
- Events: 3
- Opening: 24 February 1977
- Closing: 27 February 1977

The 15th Biathlon World Championships were held in 1977 in Vingrom, Norway.

== Men's results ==
=== 20 km individual ===
Medal	Name	Nation	Penalties	Result
1st place, gold medalist(s)	Heikki Ikola	FIN	-	-
2nd place, silver medalist(s)	Sigleif Johansen	NOR	-	-
3rd place, bronze medalist(s)	Alexander Tikhonov	URS	-	-

=== 10 km sprint ===
Medal	Name	Nation	Penalties	Result
1st place, gold medalist(s)	Alexander Tikhonov	URS	-	-
2nd place, silver medalist(s)	Nikolay Kruglov	URS	-	-
3rd place, bronze medalist(s)	Alexander Ushakov	URS	-	-

=== 4 × 7.5 km relay ===
Medal	Name	Nation	Penalties	Result
1st place, gold medalist(s)	Soviet Union Alexander Tikhonov; Aleksandr Elizarov; Alexander Ushakov; Nikolay Kruglov	URS		
2nd place, silver medalist(s)	Finland Erkki Antila; Raimo Seppänen; Simo Halonen; Heikki Ikola	FIN		
3rd place, bronze medalist(s)	East Germany Manfred Beer; Klaus Siebert; Frank Ullrich; Manfred Geyer	GDR		

== Medal table ==
Place	Nation	1st place, gold medalist(s)	2nd place, silver medalist(s)	3rd place, bronze medalist(s)	Total
1	Soviet Union	2	1	2	5
2	Finland	1	1	0	2
3	Norway	0	1	0	1
4	East Germany	0	0	1	1
