= Jan Szpunar =

Polish biathlete (1952–2017)

Personal information
- Nationality: Polish
- Born: 30 October 1952; Kościelisko, Poland
- Died: 17 March 2017 (aged 64)

Sport
- Sport: Biathlon

Jan Szpunar (30 October 1952 – 17 March 2017) was a Polish biathlete. He competed in the 20 km individual event at the 1976 Winter Olympics.
