= Andrzej Rapacz =

Polish biathlete (1948–2022)

Personal information
- Nationality: Polish
- Born: 1 September 1948 Zakopane, Poland
- Died: 7 February 2022 (aged 73) Kościelisko, Poland

Sport
- Sport: Biathlon

Andrzej Rapacz (1 September 1948 – 7 February 2022) was a Polish biathlete. He competed at the 1972 Winter Olympics and the 1976 Winter Olympics. Rapacz died on 7 February 2022, at the age of 73.
