= Biathlon World Championships 1973 =

Sports competition in Lake Placid, United States

- Host city: Lake Placid, New York
- Country: USA
- Events: 2
- Opening: 2 March 1973
- Closing: 4 March 1973

The 12th Biathlon World Championships were held in 1973 in Lake Placid, United States. It was the first time the championships took place outside Europe.

== Men's results ==
=== 20 km individual ===
Medal	Name	Nation	Penalties	Result
1st place, gold medalist(s)	Alexander Tikhonov	URS	2	1:24:30.2
2nd place, silver medalist(s)	Gennady Kovalev	URS	1	1:27:17.2
3rd place, bronze medalist(s)	Tor Svendsberget	NOR	5	1:28:08.2

=== 4 × 7.5 km relay ===
Medal	Name	Nation	Penalties	Result
1st place, gold medalist(s)	Soviet Union Alexander Tikhonov; Rinnat Safin; Yuriy Kolmakov; Gennady Kovalev	URS		
2nd place, silver medalist(s)	Norway Tor Svendsberget; Esten Gjelten; Ragnar Tveiten; Kjell Hovda	NOR		
3rd place, bronze medalist(s)	East Germany Dieter Speer; Manfred Geyer; Herbert Wiegand; Günther Bartnick	GDR		

== Medal table ==
Place	Nation	1st place, gold medalist(s)	2nd place, silver medalist(s)	3rd place, bronze medalist(s)	Total
1	Soviet Union	2	1	0	3
2	Norway	0	1	1	2
3	East Germany	0	0	1	1
