= Esko Saira =

Finnish biathlete

Medal record

Representing Finland

Men's biathlon

Olympic Games
Silver medal – second place	1972 Sapporo	4 x 7.5 km relay
Silver medal – second place	1976 Innsbruck	4 x 7.5 km relay

World championships
Bronze medal – third place	1975 Antholz-Anterselva	20 km individual

Esko Saira (born June 14, 1938, in Lemi, South Karelia) is a Finnish biathlete and Olympic medalist. He received a silver medal at the 1972 Winter Olympics in Sapporo with the Finnish team.

At the 1976 Winter Olympics in Innsbruck he again received a team silver medal.
