= Biathlon World Championships 1976 =

Sports competition in Antholz-Anterselva, Italy

- Host city: Anterselva
- Country: Italy
- Events: 1
- Opening: 31 January 1976
- Closing: 31 January 1976

The 14th Biathlon World Championships held in 1976 in Antholz-Anterselva, Italy were only for the 10 km sprint because this event was not part of the Olympic programme in Innsbruck.

== Men's results ==
=== 10 km sprint ===
Medal	Name	Nation	Penalties	Result
1st place, gold medalist(s)	Alexander Tikhonov	URS	4	36:48.2
2nd place, silver medalist(s)	Aleksandr Elizarov	URS	1	36:51.5
3rd place, bronze medalist(s)	Nikolay Kruglov	URS	2	37:19.9

== Medal table ==
Place	Nation	1st place, gold medalist(s)	2nd place, silver medalist(s)	3rd place, bronze medalist(s)	Total
1	Soviet Union	1	1	1	3
