= Biathlon at the Winter Olympics =

- IOC Code: BTH
- Governing body: IBU
- Events: 11 (men: 5; women: 5; mixed: 1)

Winter Olympics
- 1924; 1928; 1932; 1936; 1948; 1952; 1956; 1960; 1964; 1968; 1972; 1976; 1980; 1984; 1988; 1992; 1994; 1998; 2002; 2006; 2010; 2014; 2018; 2022; 2026; Note: demonstration or exhibition sport years indicated in italics
- Medalists

Biathlon debuted at the 1960 Winter Olympics in Olympic Valley, California with the men's 20 km individual event. At the 1968 Winter Olympics in Grenoble, the men's 4 × 7.5 km relay debuted, followed by the 10 km sprint event at the 1980 Winter Olympics in Lake Placid, New York. Beginning at the 1992 Winter Olympics in Albertville, women's biathlon debuted with the 15 km individual, 3 × 7.5 km relay (4 × 7.5 km during 1994–2002, and 4 × 6 km in 2006), and 7.5 km sprint. A pursuit race (12.5 km for men and 10 km for women) was included at the 2002 Winter Olympics in Salt Lake City. The top 60 finishers of the sprint race (10 km for men and 7.5 km for women) would qualify for the pursuit event. The sprint winner starts the race, followed by each successive biathlete at the same time interval they trailed the sprint winner in that event. At the 2006 Winter Olympics in Turin, a mass start (15 km for men and 12.5 km for women) was introduced where the top 30 biathletes from the previous four events were allowed to start together for the competition.

== Military patrol ==
Prior to the biathlon debut at the 1960 Winter Olympics, there was a military patrol event that was held at four Winter Olympic Games: 1924, 1928, 1936, and 1948. Medals were awarded for military patrol in 1924, but it was a demonstration event for the other three Winter Games. Military patrol is considered by the International Biathlon Union to be the precursor to biathlon.

== Summary ==
Games	Year	Events	Best Nation
1	1924	1	Switzerland (1)
2	1928	1	Norway (1)
3			
4	1936	1	Italy (1)
5	1948	1	Switzerland (2)
6			
7			
8	1960	1	Sweden (1)
9	1964	1	Soviet Union (1)
10	1968	2	Soviet Union (2)
11	1972	2	Soviet Union (3)
12	1976	2	Soviet Union (4)
13	1980	3	Soviet Union (5)

Games	Year	Events	Best Nation
14	1984	3	Norway (2)
15	1988	3	East Germany (1)
16	1992	6	Germany (1)
17	1994	6	Russia (1)
18	1998	6	Norway (3)
19	2002	8	Norway (4)
20	2006	10	Germany (2)
21	2010	10	Norway (5)
22	2014	11	Norway (6)
23	2018	11	Germany (3)
24	2022	11	Norway (7)
25	2026	11	France (1)

== Events ==
=== Men's ===
• = official event, (d) = demonstration event

Event	24	28	32	36	48	52	56	60	64	68	72	76	80	84	88	92	94	98	02	06	10	14	18	22	26	Years
Military patrol	•	(d)		(d)	(d)																					4
individual (20 km)								•	•	•	•	•	•	•	•	•	•	•	•	•	•	•	•	•	•	18
relay (4×7.5 km)										•	•	•	•	•	•	•	•	•	•	•	•	•	•	•	•	16
sprint (10 km)													•	•	•	•	•	•	•	•	•	•	•	•	•	13
pursuit (12.5 km)																			•	•	•	•	•	•	•	7
mass start (15 km)																				•	•	•	•	•	•	6
Total events	1	1		1	1			1	1	2	2	2	3	3	3	3	3	3	4	5	5	5	5	5	5	

=== Women's ===
• = official event, (d) = demonstration event

Event	24	28	32	36	48	52	56	60	64	68	72	76	80	84	88	92	94	98	02	06	10	14	18	22	26	Years
individual (15 km)																•	•	•	•	•	•	•	•	•	•	10
relay (4×6 km)																•	•	•	•	•	•	•	•	•	•	10
sprint (7.5 km)																•	•	•	•	•	•	•	•	•	•	10
pursuit (10 km)																			•	•	•	•	•	•	•	7
mass start (12.5 km)																				•	•	•	•	•	•	6
Total events																3	3	3	4	5	5	5	5	5	5	

=== Mixed ===
Event	24	28	32	36	48	52	56	60	64	68	72	76	80	84	88	92	94	98	02	06	10	14	18	22	26	Years
relay (4×6 km)																						•	•	•	•	4
Total events																						1	1	1	1	

== Medal table ==
Sources (after the 2026 Winter Olympics):
Accurate as of 2026 Winter Olympics and IOC Executive Board decision of September 19, 2025 to reallocate Olympic medals for Vancouver 2010 and Sochi 2014

Rank	Nation	Gold	Silver	Bronze	Total
1	Norway	25	23	19	67
2	Germany	21	20	14	55
3	France	19	12	14	45
4	Soviet Union	9	5	5	19
5	Russia	8	5	7	20
6	Sweden	7	7	8	22
7	Belarus	4	4	3	11
8	East Germany	3	4	4	11
9	Slovakia	3	4	0	7
10	Unified Team	2	2	2	6
11	Canada	2	0	1	3
12	Italy	1	2	6	9
13	West Germany	1	2	2	5
14	Ukraine	1	1	3	5
15	Bulgaria	1	0	2	3
16	Czech Republic	0	4	5	9
17	Austria	0	4	3	7
17	Finland	0	4	3	7
19	ROC	0	1	3	4
20	Slovenia	0	1	1	2
21	Kazakhstan	0	1	0	1
21	Poland	0	1	0	1
21	Switzerland	0	1	0	1
24	Croatia	0	0	1	1
Totals (24 entries)		107	108	106	321

Notes

- This table does not include medals of 1924 military patrol event, that the IOC now treats as a separate discipline.
- 2 silver medals and no bronze were awarded at 2010 men's individual distance.

== Number of biathletes by nation ==
Nation	24	28	32	36	48	52	56	60	64	68	72	76	80	84	88	92	94	98	02	06	10	14	18	22	26	Years
Andorra																						1				1
Argentina													4	3	3	7	1		2	1						7
Australia														1	1	2	2	1		1	1	2			1	9
Austria									4	4		4	5	4	5	5	5	5	5	6	6	9	9	10	9	16
Belarus																	11	9	11	10	9	10	10	10		8
Belgium																							2	5	8	3
Brazil																						1				1
Bosnia and Herzegovina																				2	1	1				3
Bulgaria												2	2	3	5	10	5	5	5	6	6	6	10	8	8	14
Canada										5					5	9	7	6	1	7	8	8	10	8	8	12
Chile																			2	2						2
China													5	5		8	4	4	5	6	6	5	2	8	3	12
Chinese Taipei												2		1												2
Costa Rica														1												1
Croatia																			1	1	2				3	4
Czech Republic																	10	8	10	10	10	10	11	10	10	9
Denmark																					1			1	3	3
Estonia																8	9	4	4	6	9	9	6	8	8	10
Finland								4	4	6	5	4	6	5	5	9	9	7	9	1	4	4	8	8	10	18
France								4	1	6	5	5	5	4	7	10	11	10	10	9	11	12	12	12	12	18
Germany																10	9	11	11	10	12	12	12	11	11	12
Great Britain								2	4	5	4	4	4	6	4	5	4	2	4	2	1	2	1		2	17
Greece																2	1	1	2	1	2	1				7
Guam															1											1
Hungary								1						5	1	9	5	5	3	2	1	1				10
Italy											5	4	5	5	6	10	6	6	10	10	10	10	11	10	10	15
Japan									2	4	4	5	4	4	4	3	2	8	8	9	2	5	6	6		16
Kazakhstan																	2	8	2	2	9	10	10	3	4	9
Kyrgyzstan																	1	1	1							3
Latvia																4	5	5	5	9	9	2	3	1	8	10
Lithuania																2	2	1	2	2	1	2	4	5	8	10
Moldova																	2	2	2	4	2	1		4	3	8
Mongolia									4	2																2
Norway								3	4	5	5	4	5	5	6	12	11	9	9	10	11	12	11	12	11	18
New Zealand																					1			1		2
Poland									4	6	5	4				9	10	9	5	10	10	10	7	5	8	14
Puerto Rico															1											1
Romania									4	4	5	4		5		6	5	2	4	5	5	2	6	2	5	15
Russia																	10	11	11	12	11	12				6
Serbia																					1	1				2
Slovakia																	6	5	6	10	10	8	10	8	6	9
Slovenia																5	6	9	10	8	8	6	7	6	9	10
South Korea														1	5	4		1	2	1	2	2	6	3	2	11
Spain														2						1	1	2				4
Sweden								4	4	5	4	4	4	5	4	10	10	8	5	6	10	5	10	11	12	18
Switzerland									4			3	2	1		1	3	1	4	2	6	9	10	8	10	14
Ukraine																	10	10	11	10	11	11	11	10	10	9
United States								4	4	5	4	5	6	6	5	11	9	9	8	9	9	10	10	8	8	18
NOCs no longer competing at the Winter Olympics
Czechoslovakia										2	5	5	4	5	5	10										7
East Germany										5	5	5	4	4	6											6
Olympic Athletes from Russia																							4			1
Serbia and Montenegro																				1						1
ROC																								10		1
Soviet Union								4	4	4	4	4	4	4	5											8
Unified Team																11										1
United Team of Germany								4	4																	2
West Germany										4	2	6	6	4	5											6
Yugoslavia													1	6	1	4										4
Nations	-	-	-	-	-	-	-	9	14	16	14	18	18	25	22	28	32	32	34	37	37	36	28	30	29	
Biathletes	-	-	-	-	-	-	-	30	51	72	62	74	76	95	90	196	193	183	190	204	221	216	219	212	210	
Year	24	28	32	36	48	52	56	60	64	68	72	76	80	84	88	92	94	98	02	06	10	14	18	22	26	

== See also ==
- List of Olympic venues in biathlon
- Biathlon rifle Anschütz 1827F
