= Cross-country skiing at the 1980 Winter Olympics – Men's 50 kilometre =

Men's 50 kilometre at the XIII Olympic Winter Games
- Venue: Mount Van Hoevenberg
- Dates: 23 February 1980
- Competitors: 43 from 14 nations
- Winning time: 2:27:24.60

Medalists
1st place, gold medalist(s)		Nikolay Zimyatov; Soviet Union
2nd place, silver medalist(s)		Juha Mieto; Finland
3rd place, bronze medalist(s)		Alexander Zavyalov; Soviet Union

The men's 50 kilometre cross-country skiing competition at the 1980 Winter Olympics in Lake Placid, United States, was held on Saturday 23 February at Mount Van Hoevenberg, Essex County, New York. Sven-Åke Lundbäck of Sweden was the 1978 World champion and Ivar Formo of Norway was the defending champion from the 1976 Olympics in Innsbruck, Austria.

Each skier started at half a minute intervals, skiing the entire 50 kilometre course. Of the 43 athletes who started the race, 6 did not finish. Nikolay Zimyatov of the Soviet Union took his third Gold medal of the games after winning the 30 kilometre and being part of Soviet Union's winning 4 × 10 km relay team.

== Results ==
Rank	Bib	Name	Country	Time	Deficit
1st place, gold medalist(s)	41	Nikolay Zimyatov	Soviet Union	2:27:24.60	–
2nd place, silver medalist(s)	38	Juha Mieto	Finland	2:30:20.52	+2.55.92
3rd place, bronze medalist(s)	14	Alexander Zavyalov	Soviet Union	2:30:51.52	+3:26.92
4	47	Lars Erik Eriksen	Norway	2:30:53.03	+3:28.43
5	6	Sergey Savelyev	Soviet Union	2:31:15.82	+3:51.22
6	28	Yevgeny Belyayev	Soviet Union	2:31:21.19	+3:56.59
7	20	Oddvar Brå	Norway	2:31:46.83	+4:22.23
8	36	Sven-Åke Lundbäck	Sweden	2:31:59.65	+4:35.05
9	21	Asko Autio	Finland	2:32:25.57	+5:00.97
10	18	Franz Renggli	Switzerland	2:33:27.56	+6:02.96
11	33	Matti Pitkänen	Finland	2:34:09.04	+6:44.44
12	40	Jean-Paul Pierrat	France	2:34:13.07	+6:48.47
13	37	Bill Koch	United States	2:34:31.62	+7:07.02
14	10	Heinz Gähler	Switzerland	2:35:11.20	+7:46.60
15	2	Anders Bakken	Norway	2:35:33.26	+8:08.66
16	8	Thomas Eriksson	Sweden	2:36:33.85	+9:09.25
17	42	Józef Łuszczek	Poland	2:36:38.05	+9:13.45
18	5	Pertti Teurajärvi	Finland	2:36:44.08	+9:19.48
19	22	Giulio Capitanio	Italy	2:37:01.40	+9:36.80
20	23	Jim Galanes	United States	2:37:09.64	+9:45.04
21	12	Peter Zipfel	West Germany	2:37:09.74	+9:45.14
22	46	Dieter Notz	West Germany	2:37:47.41	+10:22.81
23	44	Jiří Beran	Czechoslovakia	2:37:51.58	+10:26.98
24	32	Kjell Jakob Sollie	Norway	2:38:06.07	+10:41.47
25	39	Roberto Primus	Italy	2:38:10.10	+10:45.50
26	24	Alf-Gerd Deckert	East Germany	2:38:13.53	+10:48.93
27	17	František Šimon	Czechoslovakia	2:39:53.03	+12:28.43
28	4	Franz Schöbel	West Germany	2:40:25.96	+13:01.36
29	30	Josef Schneider	West Germany	2:40:49.68	+13:25.08
30	26	Jiří Švub	Czechoslovakia	2:40:53.94	+13:29.34
31	11	Michel Thierry	France	2:41:38.26	+14:13.66
32	1	Gianfranco Polvara	Italy	2:41:51.58	+14:26.98
33	27	Stan Dunklee	United States	2:42:20.20	+14:55.60
34	35	Erik Gustavsson	Sweden	2:43:39.93	+16:15.33
35	29	Paul Fargeix	France	2:45:39.70	+18:15.10
36	19	Luvsandashiin Dorj	Mongolia	2:48:22.97	+20:58.37
37	34	Shiro Sato	Japan	2:48:33.02	+21:08.42
	7	Philippe Poirot	France	DNF	
	9	Doug Peterson	United States	DNF	
	15	Stig Jäder	Sweden	DNF	
	25	Gaudenz Ambühl	Switzerland	DNF	
	31	Maurilio De Zolt	Italy	DNF	
	45	Konrad Hallenbarter	Switzerland	DNF	
	3	Þröstur Jóhannesson	Iceland	DNS	
	13	Tone Ðuričič	Yugoslavia	DNS	
	16	Haukur Sigurðsson	Iceland	DNS	
	43	Khristo Barzanov	Bulgaria	DNS	
