= Seefeld Nordic Competence Centre =

Skiing venue in Austria

- Seefeld Nordisches Kompetenzzentrum
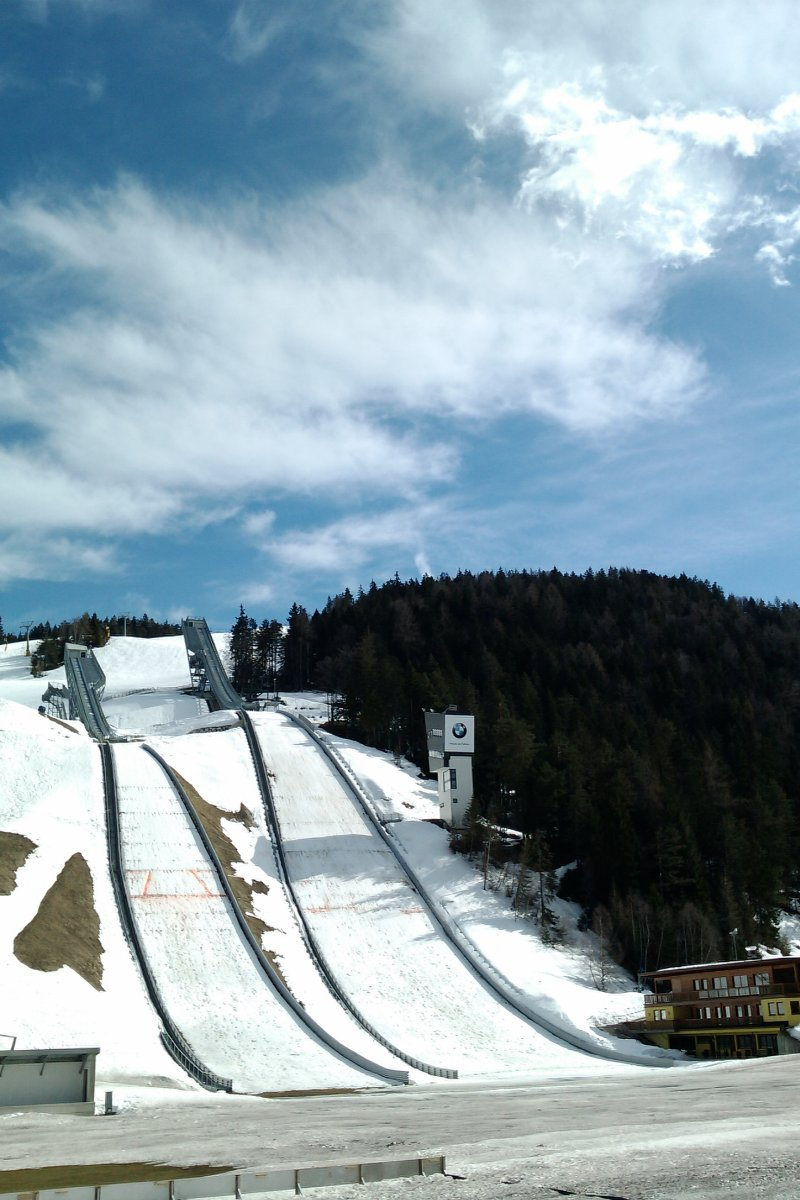
- The Toni Seelos Olympic Ski Jump at Seefeld Nordic Competence Centre.
- Interactive map of Seefeld Nordic Competence Centre
- Coordinates: 47.3224°N 11.1754°E
- Type: stadium
- Event: sporting events
- Surface: snow

Construction
- Opened: 1985

The Seefeld Nordic Competence Centre (In German: Nordisches Kompetenzzentrum) is a multi-sport venue for Nordic skiing located in Seefeld in Tirol, Austria. It consists of a cross-country skiing stadium, the Toni-Seelos-Olympiaschanzes with two ski jumping hills; a normal hill and a medium hill and a shooting range for biathlon. It has previously hosted the 1976 Winter Olympics and the FIS Nordic World Ski Championships in 1985 and 2019.

Built in 1985 in preparation for the Nordic World Championships, the centre has been continually expanded and modernised. In 2005, a central building at the foot of the ski jump was constructed in the Casino Arena to enable more extensive use of facilities.

== Sports facilities ==
In recent years Seefeld has expanded and renovated its sports facilities and positioned itself as the Nordic Skill Centre (Nordisches Kompetenzzentrum) for the training of national teams and clubs as well as the Stams Skiing Grammar School (Skigymnasium Stams).

- Toni Seelos Olympic Ski Jumps in the Casino Arena on the northwest slopes of the Gschwandtkopf (HS 109 and HS 75)
- Biathlon stand with 30 firing points
- 279 km of courses for cross-country skiing, 125 km of which is for skating and 154 km for classic cross-country skiing
- Snow-making facilities
- Asphalt roller skiing route with a length of 3.6 km and width of 3 m with variations from 560 m to 4.7 km
- FIS-homologated courses for slalom and giant slalom on the Gschwandtkopf
- Ski areas of Rosshütte, Gschwandtkopf and Geigenbühel-/Birkenlifte
- Ice rinks for skating and Bavarian curling
- Two grass areas for football, another is planned
- WM Halle with 8 indoor tennis courts and 4 outside courts
- Seefeld Tennis Club with 6 clay courts
- Golf courses: Seefeld-Reith Golf Club (9 hole, par 70) and Panorama golf course of am Geigenbühel, an 18-hole course in Wildmoos (Telfs)
- 266 km waymarked running and Nordic walking routes
- 570 km of cycling and mountain bike routes
- Beach volleyball court
- Two riding halls with outdoor riding paddocks
- Fitness studio

== Notable events ==
Date	Category	Event	Winner	Second	Third	Sport	M/W
5 February 1976	Winter Olympics	30 km	Sergey Savelyev (URS)	Bill Koch (USA)	Ivan Garanin (URS)	Cross-country skiing	M
6 February 1976	Winter Olympics	Individual	Nikolay Kruglov (URS)	Heikki Ikola (FIN)	Aleksandr Elizarov (URS)	Biathlon	M
7 February 1976	Winter Olympics	5 km	Helena Takalo (FIN)	Raisa Smetanina (URS)	Nina Baldycheva (URS)	Cross-country skiing	W
8 February 1976	Winter Olympics	15 km	Nikolay Bazhukov (URS)	Yevgeny Belyayev (URS)	Arto Koivisto (FIN)	Cross-country skiing	M
10 February 1976	Winter Olympics	10 km	Raisa Smetanina (URS)	Helena Takalo (FIN)	Galina Kulakova (URS)	Cross-country skiing	W
12 February 1976	Winter Olympics	4×10 km	Finland; Matti Pitkänen; Juha Mieto; Pertti Teurajärvi; Arto Koivisto	Norway; Pål Tyldum; Einar Sagstuen; Ivar Formo; Odd Martinsen	Soviet Union; Yevgeny Belyayev; Nikolay Bazhukov; Sergey Savelyev; Ivan Garanin	Cross-country skiing	M
12 February 1976	Winter Olympics	4×5 km	Soviet Union; Nina Baldycheva; Zinaida Amosova; Raisa Smetanina; Galina Kulakova	Finland; Liisa Suikhonen; Marjatta Kajosmaa; Hilkka Riihivuori; Helena Takalo	East Germany; Monika Debertshäuser; Sigrun Krause; Barbara Petzold; Veronika Hesse	Cross-country skiing	W
13 February 1976	Winter Olympics	4×7.5 km relay	Soviet Union; Aleksandr Elizarov; Ivan Biakov; Nikolay Kruglov; Aleksandr Tikhonov	Finland; Henrik Flöjt; Esko Saira; Juhani Suutarinen; Heikki Ikola	East Germany; Karl-Heinz Menz; Frank Ullrich; Manfred Beer; Manfred Geyer	Biathlon	M
14 February 1976	Winter Olympics	50 km	Ivar Formo (NOR)	Gert-Dietmar Klause (GDR)	Benny Södergren (SWE)	Cross-country skiing	M
15 February 1976	Winter Olympics	Normal hill	Hans-Georg Aschenbach (GDR)	Jochen Danneberg (GDR)	Karl Schnabl (AUT)	Ski jumping	M
18 January 1985	World Championships	30 km	Gunde Svan (SWE)	Ove Aunli (NOR)	Harri Kirvesniemi (FIN)	Cross-country skiing	M
19 January 1985	World Championships	10 km	Anette Bøe (NOR)	Marja-Liisa Kirvesniemi (FIN)	Grete Ingeborg Nykkelmo (NOR)	Cross-country skiing	W
21 January 1985	World Championships	5 km	Anette Bøe (NOR)	Marja-Liisa Kirvesniemi (FIN)	Grete Ingeborg Nykkelmo (NOR)	Cross-country skiing	W
22 January 1985	World Championships	15 km	Gunde Svan (SWE)	Maurilio De Zolt (ITA)	Ove Aunli (NOR)	Cross-country skiing	M
22 January 1985	World Championships	4×5 km	Soviet Union; Tamara Tikhonova; Raisa Smetanina; Liliya Vasilchenko; Anfisa Romanova	Norway; Anette Bøe; Anne Jahren; Grete Ingeborg Nykkelmo; Berit Aunli	East Germany; Manuela Drescher; Gaby Nestler; Antje Misersky; Ute Noack	Cross-country skiing	W
24 January 1985	World Championships	4×10 km	Norway; Arild Monsen; Pål Gunnar Mikkelsplass; Tor Håkon Holte; Ove Aunli	Italy; Marco Albarello; Giorgio Vanzetta; Maurilio De Zolt; Giuseppe Ploner	Sweden; Erik Östlund; Thomas Wassberg; Thomas Eriksson; Gunde Svan	Cross-country skiing	M
26 January 1985	World Championships	20 km	Grete Ingeborg Nykkelmo (NOR)	Brit Pettersen (NOR)	Anette Bøe (NOR)	Cross-country skiing	W
27 January 1985	World Championships	50 km	Kari Harkönen (FIN)	Thomas Wassberg (SWE)	Maurilio De Zolt (ITA)	Cross-country skiing	M
2 February 1996	World Cup	10 km freestyle	Bjørn Dæhlie (NOR)	Fulvio Valbusa (ITA)	Jari Isometsä (FIN)	Cross-country skiing	M
2 February 1996	World Cup	10 km freestyle	Manuela Di Centa (ITA)	Stefania Belmondo (ITA)	Yelena Vyalbe (RUS)	Cross-country skiing	W
3 February 1996	World Cup	Team Sprint freestyle	Italy; Fulvio Valbusa; Silvio Fauner	Sweden; Niklas Jonsson; Torgny Mogren	Finland; Mika Myllylä; Jari Isometsä	Cross-country skiing	M
3 February 1996	World Cup	Team Sprint freestyle	Italy; Stefania Belmondo; Manuela Di Centa	Norway; Trude Dybendahl; Anita Moen	Russia; Yelena Vyalbe; Olga Savialova	Cross-country skiing	W
14 February 1999	World Cup	10 km freestyle	Mika Myllylä (FIN)	Mikhail Botvinov (AUT)	Jari Isometsä (FIN)	Cross-country skiing	M
14 February 1999	World Cup	5 km freestyle	Nina Gavrilyuk (RUS)	Anfisa Reztsova (RUS)	Stefania Belmondo (ITA)	Cross-country skiing	W
30 January 2010	World Cup	Normal hill/10 km	Eric Frenzel (GER)	Mario Stecher (AUT)	Akito Watabe (JPN)	Nordic Combined	M
31 January 2010	World Cup	Normal hill/10 km	Mario Stecher (AUT)	Eric Frenzel (GER)	Alessandro Pittin (ITA)	Nordic Combined	M
19 January 2013	World Cup	Normal hill/10 km	Eric Frenzel (GER)	Magnus Moan (NOR)	Tino Edelmann (GER)	Nordic Combined	M
20 January 2013	World Cup	Normal hill/10 km	Eric Frenzel (GER)	Mikko Kokslien (NOR)	Taylor Fletcher (USA)	Nordic Combined	M
17 January 2014	World Cup	Normal hill/5 km	Eric Frenzel (GER)	Magnus Moan (NOR)	Tino Edelmann (GER)	Nordic Combined	M
18 January 2014	World Cup	Normal hill/10 km	Eric Frenzel (GER)	Johannes Rydzek (GER)	Magnus Moan (NOR)	Nordic Combined	M
19 January 2014	World Cup	Normal hill/15 km	Eric Frenzel (GER)	Håvard Klemetsen (NOR)	Magnus Moan (NOR)	Nordic Combined	M
16 January 2015	World Cup	Normal hill/5 km	Eric Frenzel (GER)	Jan Schmid (NOR)	Jarl Magnus Riiber (NOR)	Nordic Combined	M
17 January 2015	World Cup	Normal hill/10 km	Eric Frenzel (GER)	Bernhard Gruber (AUT)	Tino Edelmann (GER)	Nordic Combined	M
18 January 2015	World Cup	Normal hill/15 km	Eric Frenzel (GER)	Håvard Klemetsen (NOR)	Akito Watabe (JPN)	Nordic Combined	M
29 January 2016	World Cup	Normal hill/5 km	Eric Frenzel (GER)	Akito Watabe (JPN)	Fabian Rießle (GER)	Nordic Combined	M
30 January 2016	World Cup	Normal hill/10 km	Eric Frenzel (GER)	Akito Watabe (JPN)	Fabian Rießle (GER)	Nordic Combined	M
31 January 2016	World Cup	Normal hill/10 km	Eric Frenzel (GER)	Akito Watabe (JPN)	Fabian Rießle (GER)	Nordic Combined	M
27 January 2017	World Cup	Normal hill/5 km	Johannes Rydzek (GER)	Eric Frenzel (GER)	Samuel Costa (ITA)	Nordic Combined	M
28 January 2017	World Cup	Normal hill/10 km	Johannes Rydzek (GER)	Eric Frenzel (GER)	Samuel Costa (ITA)	Nordic Combined	M
29 January 2017	World Cup	Normal hill/15 km	Eric Frenzel (GER)	Johannes Rydzek (GER)	Bernhard Gruber (AUT)	Nordic Combined	M
27 January 2017	World Cup	Normal hill/5 km	Johannes Rydzek (GER)	Eric Frenzel (GER)	Samuel Costa (ITA)	Nordic Combined	M
27 January 2018	World Cup	Sprint freestyle	Sophie Caldwell (USA); Laurien van der Graaff (SUI)	none	Maiken Caspersen Falla (NOR)	Cross-country skiing	W
27 January 2018	World Cup	Sprint freestyle	Johannes Høsflot Klæbo (NOR)	Lucas Chanavat (FRA)	Calle Halfvarsson (SWE)	Cross-country skiing	M
28 January 2018	World Cup	10 km freestyle (ms)	Jessie Diggins (USA)	Heidi Weng (NOR)	Ragnhild Haga (NOR)	Cross-country skiing	W
28 January 2018	World Cup	15 km freestyle (ms)	Dario Cologna (SUI)	Alex Harvey (CAN)	Martin Johnsrud Sundby (NOR)	Cross-country skiing	M
26 January 2019	World Cup	Normal hill/5 km	Akito Watabe (JPN)	Jarl Magnus Riiber (NOR)	Fabian Rießle (GER)	Nordic Combined	M
27 January 2019	World Cup	Normal hill/10 km	Akito Watabe (JPN)	Vinzenz Geiger (GER)	Jarl Magnus Riiber (NOR)	Nordic Combined	M
28 January 2019	World Cup	Normal hill/15 km	Akito Watabe (JPN)	Jarl Magnus Riiber (NOR)	Fabian Rießle (GER)	Nordic Combined	M
21 February 2019	World Championships	Sprint freestyle	Maiken Caspersen Falla (NOR)	Stina Nilsson (SWE)	Mari Eide (NOR)	Cross-country skiing	W
21 February 2019	World Championships	Sprint freestyle	Johannes Høsflot Klæbo (NOR)	Federico Pellegrino (ITA)	Gleb Retivykh (RUS)	Cross-country skiing	M
22 February 2019	World Championships	Large hill (Note: Ski jumping held in Innsbruck)/10 km	Eric Frenzel (GER)	Jan Schmid (NOR)	Franz-Josef Rehrl (AUT)	Nordic Combined	M
23 February 2019	World Championships	15 km skiathlon	Therese Johaug (NOR)	Ingvild Flugstad Østberg (NOR)	Natalya Nepryayeva (RUS)	Cross-country skiing	W
23 February 2019	World Championships	30 km skiathlon	Sjur Røthe (NOR)	Alexander Bolshunov (RUS)	Martin Johnsrud Sundby (NOR)	Cross-country skiing	M
24 February 2019	World Championships	Team sprint classic	Sweden; Stina Nilsson; Maja Dahlqvist	Slovenia; Katja Višnar; Anamarija Lampič	Norway; Ingvild Flugstad Østberg; Maiken Caspersen Falla	Cross-country skiing	W
24 February 2019	World Championships	Team sprint classic	Norway; Emil Iversen; Johannes Høsflot Klæbo	Russia; Gleb Retivykh; Alexander Bolshunov	Italy; Francesco De Fabiani; Federico Pellegrino	Cross-country skiing	M
24 February 2019	World Championships	Large hill/Team sprint	Germany; Eric Frenzel; Fabian Rießle	Norway; Jan Schmid; Jarl Magnus Riiber	Austria; Franz-Josef Rehrl; Bernhard Gruber	Nordic Combined	M
26 February 2019	World Championships	10 km classic	Therese Johaug (NOR)	Frida Karlsson (SWE)	Ingvild Flugstad Østberg (NOR)	Cross-country skiing	W
24 February 2019	World Championships	Team normal hill	Germany; Juliane Seyfarth; Ramona Straub; Carina Vogt; Katharina Althaus	Austria; Eva Pinkelnig; Jacqueline Seifriedsberger; Chiara Hölzl; Daniela Iraschko-Stolz	Norway; Anna Odine Strøm; Ingebjørg Saglien Bråten; Silje Opseth; Maren Lundby	Ski jumping	W
27 February 2019	World Championships	15 km classic	Martin Johnsrud Sundby (NOR)	Alexander Bessmertnykh (RUS)	Iivo Niskanen (FIN)	Cross-country skiing	M
27 February 2019	World Championships	Normal hill	Maren Lundby (NOR)	Katharina Althaus (GER)	Daniela Iraschko-Stolz (AUT)	Ski jumping	W
28 February 2019	World Championships	4×5 km	Sweden; Ebba Andersson; Frida Karlsson; Charlotte Kalla; Stina Nilsson	Norway; Heidi Weng; Ingvild Flugstad Østberg; Astrid Uhrenholdt Jacobsen; Therese Johaug	Russia; Yuliya Belorukova; Anastasia Sedova; Anna Nechaevskaya; Natalya Nepryayeva	Cross-country skiing	W
28 February 2019	World Championships	Normal hill/10 km	Jarl Magnus Riiber (NOR)	Bernhard Gruber (AUT)	Akito Watabe (JPN)	Nordic Combined	M
1 March 2019	World Championships	4×10 km	Norway; Emil Iversen; Martin Johnsrud Sundby; Sjur Røthe; Johannes Høsflot Klæbo	Russia; Andrey Larkov; Alexander Bessmertnykh; Alexander Bolshunov; Sergey Ustiugov	France; Adrien Backscheider; Maurice Manificat; Clément Parisse; Richard Jouve	Cross-country skiing	M
1 March 2019	World Championships	Normal hill	Dawid Kubacki (POL)	Kamil Stoch (POL)	Stefan Kraft (AUT)	Ski jumping	M
2 March 2019	World Championships	30 km freestyle	Therese Johaug (NOR)	Ingvild Flugstad Østberg (NOR)	Frida Karlsson (SWE)	Cross-country skiing	W
2 March 2019	World Championships	Normal hill/4×5 km	Norway; Espen Bjørnstad; Jan Schmid; Jørgen Graabak; Jarl Magnus Riiber	Germany; Johannes Rydzek; Eric Frenzel; Fabian Rießle; Vinzenz Geiger	Austria; Bernhard Gruber; Mario Seidl; Franz-Josef Rehrl; Lukas Klapfer	Nordic Combined	M
2 March 2019	World Championships	Team normal hill	Germany; Katharina Althaus; Markus Eisenbichler; Juliane Seyfarth; Karl Geiger	Austria; Eva Pinkelnig; Philipp Aschenwald; Daniela Iraschko-Stolz; Stefan Kraft	Norway; Anna Odine Strøm; Robert Johansson; Maren Lundby; Andreas Stjernen	Ski jumping	X
3 March 2019	World Championships	50 km freestyle	Hans Christer Holund (NOR)	Alexander Bolshunov (RUS)	Sjur Røthe (NOR)	Cross-country skiing	M
