= Cross-country skiing at the 1980 Winter Olympics – Men's 30 kilometre =

Men's 30 kilometre at the XIII Olympic Winter Games
- Venue: Mount Van Hoevenberg
- Dates: 14 February 1980
- Competitors: 57 from 20 nations
- Winning time: 1:27:02.80

Medalists
1st place, gold medalist(s)		Nikolay Zimyatov; Soviet Union
2nd place, silver medalist(s)		Vasily Rochev; Soviet Union
3rd place, bronze medalist(s)		Ivan Lebanov; Bulgaria

The men's 30 kilometre cross-country skiing competition at the 1980 Winter Olympics in Lake Placid, United States, was held on Thursday 14 February at the Mount Van Hoevenberg in Essex County, New York.

Each skier started at half a minute intervals, skiing the entire 30 kilometre course. Sergey Savelyev of the Soviet Union was the 1978 World champion and also the defending Olympic champion from 1976 Olympics in Innsbruck, Austria.

== Results ==
Rank	Bib	Name	Country	Time	Deficit
1st place, gold medalist(s)	56	Nikolay Zimyatov	Soviet Union	1:27:02.80	–
2nd place, silver medalist(s)	36	Vasily Rochev	Soviet Union	1:27:34.22	+31.42
3rd place, bronze medalist(s)	54	Ivan Lebanov	Bulgaria	1:28:03.87	+1:01.07
4	58	Thomas Wassberg	Sweden	1:28:40.35	+1:37.55
5	57	Józef Łuszczek	Poland	1:29:03.64	+2:00.84
6	49	Matti Pitkänen	Finland	1:29:35.03	+2:32.23
7	26	Juha Mieto	Finland	1:29:45.08	+2:42.28
8	25	Ove Aunli	Norway	1:29:54.02	+2:51.22
9	40	Alf-Gerd Deckert	East Germany	1:30:05.17	+3:02.37
10	45	Lars Erik Eriksen	Norway	1:30:34.34	+3:31.54
11	19	Yevgeny Belyayev	Soviet Union	1:30:35.32	+3:32.52
12	47	Oddvar Brå	Norway	1:30:46.70	+3:43.90
13	16	Benny Kohlberg	Sweden	1:30:57.56	+3:54.76
14	10	Nikolay Bazhukov	Soviet Union	1:31:06.28	+4:03.48
15	20	Edi Hauser	Switzerland	1:31:20.09	+4:17.29
16	8	Per Knut Aaland	Norway	1:31:26.58	+4:23.78
17	38	Sven-Åke Lundbäck	Sweden	1:31:31.96	+4:29.16
18	43	Harri Kirvesniemi	Finland	1:31:35.13	+4:32.33
19	46	Jean-Paul Pierrat	France	1:31:43.03	+4:40.23
20	50	Maurilio De Zolt	Italy	1:31:43.74	+4:40.94
21	27	Jiří Beran	Czechoslovakia	1:31:46.11	+4:43.31
22	34	Dieter Notz	West Germany	1:31:58.27	+4:55.47
23	44	Khristo Barzanov	Bulgaria	1:32:03.49	+5:00.69
24	42	Gaudenz Ambühl	Switzerland	1:32:06.20	+5:03.40
25	12	Stig Jäder	Sweden	1:32:08.09	+5:05.29
26	13	Jorma Aalto	Finland	1:32:48.10	+5:45.30
27	35	Giulio Capitanio	Italy	1:33:07.48	+6:04.68
28	5	Jiří Švub	Czechoslovakia	1:33:12.73	+6:09.93
29	4	Heinz Gähler	Switzerland	1:33:43.68	+6:40.88
30	33	Stan Dunklee	United States	1:33:48.02	+6:45.22
31	11	Josef Schneider	West Germany	1:34:05.33	+7:02.53
32	39	Miloš Bečvář	Czechoslovakia	1:34:08.79	+7:05.99
33	30	Ivo Čarman	Yugoslavia	1:34:09.59	+7:06.79
34	3	Benedetto Carrara	Italy	1:34:27.45	+7:24.65
35	32	Paul Fargeix	France	1:35:12.25	+8:09.45
36	53	František Šimon	Czechoslovakia	1:35:32.70	+8:29.90
37	51	Wolfgang Müller	West Germany	1:35:34.76	+8:31.96
38	1	Philippe Poirot	France	1:35:47.39	+8:44.59
39	23	Shiro Sato	Japan	1:35:52.77	+8:49.97
40	22	Peter Zipfel	West Germany	1:36:06.95	+9:04.15
41	21	Jim Galanes	United States	1:36:15.17	+9:12.37
42	55	Francis Jacot	Switzerland	1:36:50.46	+9:47.66
43	29	Roberto Primus	Italy	1:37:55.47	+10:52.67
44	28	Michel Thierry	France	1:38:17.35	+11:14.55
45	6	Doug Peterson	United States	1:38:29.86	+11:27.06
46	24	Tone Ðuričič	Yugoslavia	1:38:46.90	+11:44.10
47	41	Jose Giro	Spain	1:41:57.97	+14:55.17
48	7	Ingólfur Jónsson	Iceland	1:45:55.26	+18:52.46
49	18	Emiliano Morlans	Spain	1:46:28.42	+19:25.62
50	9	Marcos Luis Jerman	Argentina	1:47:56.17	+20:53.37
51	17	Kim Dong-Hwan	South Korea	1:51:13.35	+24:10.55
52	14	Luvsandashiin Dorj	Mongolia	1:53:52.24	+26:49.44
	2	Kim Nam-Young	South Korea	DNF	
	15	Þröstur Jóhannesson	Iceland	DNF	
	31	Haukur Sigurðsson	Iceland	DNF	
	37	Hwang Byung-Dae	South Korea	DNF	
	43	Bill Koch	United States	DNF	
	52	Kim Chun-Ki	South Korea	DNS	
