= Cross-country skiing at the 1980 Winter Olympics – Men's 4 × 10 kilometre relay =

Men's 4 × 10 kilometre relay at the XIII Olympic Winter Games
- Cross-country skiing
- Venue: Mount Van Hoevenberg
- Date: 20 February 1980
- Competitors: 40 (10 teams) from 10 nations
- Winning time: 1:57:03.46

Medalists
1st place, gold medalist(s)		Vasily Rochev; Nikolay Bazhukov; Yevgeny Belyayev; Nikolay Zimyatov	Soviet Union
2nd place, silver medalist(s)		Lars Erik Eriksen; Per Knut Aaland; Ove Aunli; Oddvar Brå	Norway
3rd place, bronze medalist(s)		Harri Kirvesniemi; Pertti Teurajärvi; Matti Pitkänen; Juha Mieto	Finland

The 4 × 10 kilometre relay cross-country skiing at the 1980 Winter Olympics in Lake Placid, New York, United States was held on Wednesday 20 February at the Mount Van Hoevenberg. It was the tenth appearance of the 4 × 10 km relay in the Winter Olympics.

It was the third time that Soviet Union won the gold medal in the event. Norway finished second in the relay, Finland in third place.

== Results ==
Rank	Bib	Team	Time	Deficit
1st place, gold medalist(s)	4	Soviet Union; Vasily Rochev; Nikolay Bazhukov; Yevgeny Belyayev; Nikolay Zimyatov	1:57:03.46	–
2nd place, silver medalist(s)	3	Norway; Lars Erik Eriksen; Per Knut Aaland; Ove Aunli; Oddvar Brå	1:58:45.77	+1:42.31
3rd place, bronze medalist(s)	2	Finland; Harri Kirvesniemi; Pertti Teurajärvi; Matti Pitkänen; Juha Mieto	2:00:00.18	+2:56.72
4	6	West Germany; Peter Zipfel; Wolfgang Müller; Dieter Notz; Jochen Behle	2:00:22.74	+3:19.28
5	1	Sweden; Sven-Åke Lundbäck; Thomas Eriksson; Benny Kohlberg; Thomas Wassberg	2:00:42.71	+3:39.25
6	10	Italy; Maurilio De Zolt; Benedetto Carrara; Giulio Capitanio; Giorgio Vanzetta	2:01:09.93	+4:06.47
7	5	Switzerland; Hansüli Kreuzer; Konrad Hallenbarter; Edi Hauser; Gaudenz Ambühl	2:03:36.57	+6:33.11
8	8	United States; Bill Koch; Tim Caldwell; Jim Galanes; Stan Dunklee	2:04:12.17	+7:08.71
9	7	Czechoslovakia; František Šimon; Miloš Bečvář; Jiří Švub; Jiří Beran	2:04:18.66	+7:15.20
10	9	France; Paul Fargeix; Gérard Durand-Poudret; Michel Thierry; Jean-Paul Pierrat	2:08:43.61	+11:40.15
