= Per Knut Aaland =

Norwegian cross-country skier

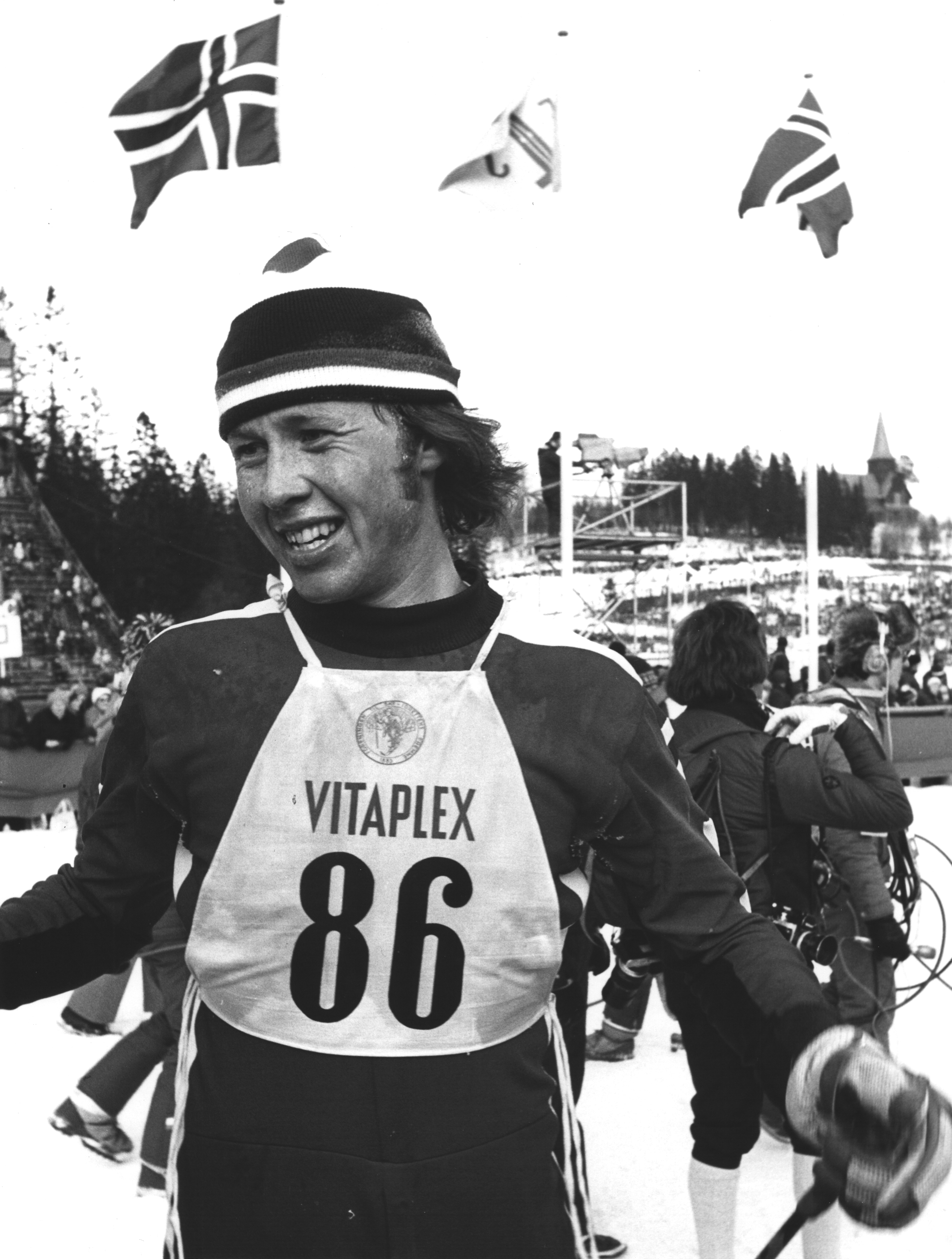
- Per Knut Aaland in 1976

Personal information
- Nationality: Norway
- Born: September 5, 1954 (age 71) Innvik Municipality, Norway

Sport
- Sport: Skiing
- Club: Hardbagg IL

World Cup career
- Seasons: 5 – (1982–1983, 1985–1987)
- Indiv. starts: 10
- Indiv. podiums: 3
- Indiv. wins: 0
- Team starts: 0
- Overall titles: 0 – (16th in 1983)
Medal record
Men's cross-country skiing
Representing Norway
Olympic Games
Silver medal – second place	1980 Lake Placid	4 ×10 km relay

Per Knut Aaland (born 5 September 1954 in Norway) is a retired Norwegian cross-country skier.

He was born in Randabygda, in Innvik Municipality. He later lived in Hornindal Municipality and represented the sports club Hardbagg IL. He won a silver medal in the 4 × 10 km relay at the 1980 Olympic Games in Lake Placid, New York. He also finished sixth in the 50 km race at the 1976 Olympic Games and sixteenth in the 30 km race at the 1980 Olympic Games. His best career finish was second in three World Cup events.

Despite retiring in 1987, Aaland continued his involvement with the Norwegian national skiing team into the 1990s as a waxing expert.

== Cross-country skiing results ==
All results are sourced from the International Ski Federation (FIS).

=== Olympic Games ===
- 1 medal – (1 silver)

Year	Age	15 km	30 km	50 km	4 × 10 km relay
1976	21	—	—	6	—
1980	25	—	16	—	Silver

=== World Championships ===
Year	Age	15 km	30 km	50 km	4 × 10 km relay
1978	23	—	—	16	—
1982	27	—	27	29	—

=== World Cup ===
==== Season standings ====
Season	Age	Overall
1982	27	44
1983	28	16
1985	30	39
1986	31	35
1987	32	18

==== Individual podiums ====
- 3 podiums

No.	Season	Date	Location	Race	Level	Place
1	1982–83	20 February 1983	Kavgolovo, Soviet Union	50 km Individual	World Cup	2nd
2	1982–83	12 March 1983	Oslo, Norway	50 km Individual	World Cup	2nd
3	1986–87	21 March 1987	Oslo, Norway	50 km Individual C	World Cup	2nd
