= Vasily Rochev (skier, born 1951) =

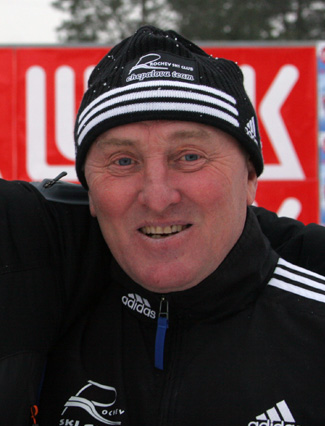
- Rochev in 2008.

Personal information
- Born: Vasily Pavlovich Rochev; 22 December 1951 (age 74) Bakur, Izhemsky District, Komi ASSR, Soviet Union
Medal record
Men's cross-country skiing
Representing the Soviet Union
Olympic Games
Gold medal – first place	1980 Lake Placid	4 × 10 km relay
Silver medal – second place	1980 Lake Placid	30 km
World Championships
Silver medal – second place	1974 Falun	4 × 10 km relay
Bronze medal – third place	1974 Falun	15 km

Vasily Pavlovich Rochev (Russian: Васи́лий Па́влович Рочев) (born 22 December 1951 in the village of Bakur, Izhemsky District, Komi ASSR) is a former Soviet/Russian cross-country skier who competed in the 1970s and early 1980s, training at Dynamo in Syktyvkar. He won two medals for the Soviet Union at the 1980 Winter Olympics in Lake Placid, New York, with a gold in the 4 × 10 km relay and a silver in the 30 km.

Rochev also won two medals at the 1974 FIS Nordic World Ski Championships with a silver in the 4 × 10 km relay and a bronze in the 15 km.

Married to fellow Soviet cross-country skier Nina Selyunina, he is the father of Vasily Rochev who won the bronze medal in the team sprint at the 2006 Winter Olympics in Turin, and four medals at the FIS Nordic World Ski Championships in Oberstdorf with a gold in the individual sprint (2005), silvers in the team sprint and relay (both 2007), and a bronze in the 4 × 10 km relay (2007).

== Cross-country skiing results ==
All results are sourced from the International Ski Federation (FIS).

=== Olympic Games ===
- 2 medals – (1 gold, 1 silver)

Year	Age	15 km	30 km	50 km	4 × 10 km relay
1976	24	—	10	12	—
1980	28	13	Silver	—	Gold

=== World Championships ===
- 2 medals – (1 silver, 1 bronze)

Year	Age	15 km	30 km	50 km	4 × 10 km relay
1974	22	Bronze	—	5	Silver
1978	26	8	—	—	4
