= Kjell Jakob Sollie =

Norwegian cross-country skier

Personal information
- Born: 26 June 1953 (age 72) Røros Municipality, Norway

Sport
- Sport: Cross-country skiing

Kjell Jakob Sollie (born 26 June 1953) is a Norwegian cross-country skier. He was born in Røros Municipality, and represented the club Ålen IL. He competed at the 1980 Winter Olympics in Lake Placid, where he placed 24th in the 50 km.

== Cross-country skiing results ==
=== Olympic Games ===
Year	Age	15 km	30 km	50 km	4 × 10 km relay
1980	26	—	—	24	—
