= Jorma Aalto =

Finnish cross-country skier (born 1957)

Personal information
- Nationality: Finland
- Born: 24 August 1957 Tampere, Finland
- Height: 1.82 m (6 ft 0 in); 75 kg (165 lb)

Sport
- Sport: Skiing

World Cup career
- Seasons: 1983
- Indiv. starts: 1
- Indiv. podiums: 0
- Team starts: 0

Jorma Ilmari Aalto (born 24 August 1957) is a Finnish cross-country skier. He competed in the men's 30 kilometre cross-country ski race at the 1980 Winter Olympics.

== Cross-country skiing results ==
All results are sourced from the International Ski Federation (FIS).

=== Olympic Games ===
Year	Age	15 km	30 km	50 km	4 × 10 km relay
1980	22	—	26	—	—

=== World Cup ===
==== Season standings ====
Season	Age	Overall
1983	24	NC
