= Erik Gustavsson =

Swedish cross-country skier

Personal information
- Nationality: Swedish
- Born: 20 February 1956 (age 69) Malung, Sweden

Sport
- Sport: Cross-country skiing

Erik Gustavsson (born 20 February 1956) is a Swedish cross-country skier. He competed in the 50 km event at the 1980 Winter Olympics.

== Cross-country skiing results ==
=== Olympic Games ===
Year	Age	15 km	30 km	50 km	4 × 10 km relay
1980	24	—	—	34	—
