= Anders Bakken =

Norwegian cross-country skier

Personal information
- Nationality: Norway
- Born: 20 June 1955 (age 71) Lillehammer, Norway

Sport
- Sport: Skiing
- Club: Lillehammer SK

World Cup career
- Seasons: 1 – (1982)
- Indiv. starts: 1
- Indiv. podiums: 0
- Team starts: 0
- Overall titles: 0 – (46th in 1982)

Anders Bakken (born 20 June 1955) is a Norwegian cross-country skier.

He was born in Lillehammer, and represented the club Lillehammer SK. He competed at the 1980 Winter Olympics in Lake Placid, where he placed 15th in the 50 km. He was Norwegian champion in 50 km in 1981.

He is the uncle of cross-country skier Ragnhild Haga.

== Cross-country skiing results ==
All results are sourced from the International Ski Federation (FIS).

=== Olympic Games ===
Year	Age	15 km	30 km	50 km	4 × 10 km relay
1980	24	—	—	15	—

=== World Championships ===
Year	Age	15 km	30 km	50 km	4 × 10 km relay
1978	22	—	13	12	—

=== World Cup ===
==== Season standings ====
Season	Age	Overall
1982	26	46
