= Sven-Åke Lundbäck =

Swedish cross-country skier (born 1948)

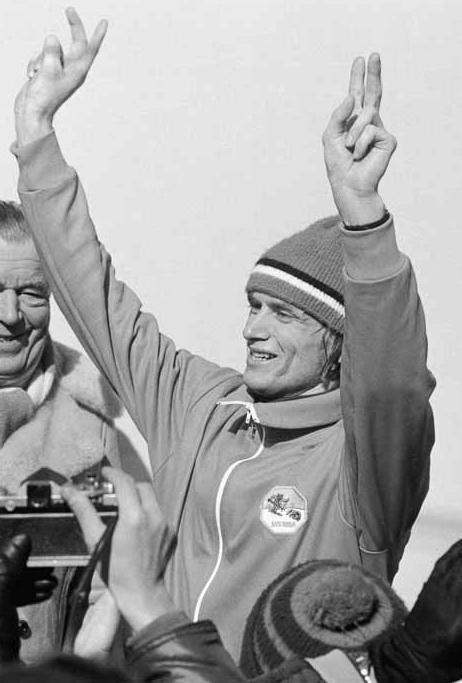
- Lundbäck at the 1972 Olympics

Personal information
- Born: 26 January 1948 (age 78) Töre, Sweden
- Height: 175 cm (5 ft 9 in)
- Weight: 66 kg (146 lb)

Sport
- Sport: Cross-country skiing
- Club: Bergnäsets AIK, Luleå
Medal record
Representing Sweden
Olympic Games
Gold medal – first place	1972 Sapporo	15 km
World Championships
Gold medal – first place	1978 Lahti	50 km
Gold medal – first place	1978 Lahti	4 × 10 km relay

Sven-Åke Lundbäck (born 26 January 1948) is a former Swedish cross-country skier. He competed at the 1972, 1976 and 1980 Olympics in the 15 km, 30 km and 4 × 10 km events and won a gold medal over 15 km in 1972. He was close to a bronze medal in the 4 × 10 km relay in 1972, but fell near the finish; he had another fourth place in the relay in 1980.

Lundbäck won the 50 km and 4 × 10 km events at the 1978 World Championships, the 50 km race at the 1976 Holmenkollen ski festival, and the 90 km Vasaloppet in 1981. After his 1981 win, one of the Vasaloppet hills was named after Lundbäck. Domestically he collected 10 Swedish individual titles, clean-sweeping the 15, 30 and 50 km gold medals in 1976 and 1978. He was known for having an exceptionally high oxygen consumption rate of 94.6 mL/kg/minute.

Lundbäck took up competitive skiing in 1964, when his family moved from Töre to Luleå. After retiring from competitions he received a degree in physical education from the Swedish School of Sport and Health Sciences in Stockholm in 1984. After that he worked as a school teacher in Luleå until 2011, when his school was closed down. He is married to the Olympic cross-country skier Lena Carlzon-Lundbäck; they have a daughter and a son, who also competed in cross-country skiing. Lundbäck did not receive the Svenska Dagbladet gold medal in 1978. In protest to this decision his teammate Thomas Wassberg refused to accept his Svenska Dagbladet medal in 1980.

== Cross-country skiing results ==
All results are sourced from the International Ski Federation (FIS).

=== Olympic Games ===
- 1 medal – (1 gold)

Year	Age	15 km	30 km	50 km	4 × 10 km relay
1972	24	Gold	13	—	4
1976	28	30	35	16	4
1980	32	—	17	8	5

=== World Championships ===
- 2 medals – (2 gold)

Year	Age	15 km	30 km	50 km	4 × 10 km relay
1974	26	—	—	4	—
1978	30	6	6	Gold	Gold
