= Cross-country skiing at the 1976 Winter Olympics – Men's 4 × 10 kilometre relay =

Men's 4 × 10 kilometre relay at the XII Olympic Winter Games
- Cross-country skiing
- Venue: Seefeld
- Date: 11 February 1976
- Competitors: 64 (16 teams) from 16 nations
- Winning time: 2:07:59.72

Medalists
1st place, gold medalist(s)		Matti Pitkänen; Juha Mieto; Pertti Teurajärvi; Arto Koivisto	Finland
2nd place, silver medalist(s)		Pål Tyldum; Einar Sagstuen; Ivar Formo; Odd Martinsen	Norway
3rd place, bronze medalist(s)		Yevgeny Belyayev; Nikolay Bazhukov; Sergey Savelyev; Ivan Garanin	Soviet Union

The 4 × 10 kilometre relay cross-country skiing at the 1976 Winter Olympics in Innsbruck, Austria was held on Thursday 12 February at Seefeld. It was the ninth appearance of the 4 × 10 km relay in the Winter Olympics.

It was the fourth time that Finland won the gold medal in the event. Norway finished second in the relay, the Soviet Union won bronze.

== Results ==
Rank	Bib	Team	Time	Deficit
1st place, gold medalist(s)	4	Finland; Matti Pitkänen; Juha Mieto; Pertti Teurajärvi; Arto Koivisto	2:07:59.72	–
2nd place, silver medalist(s)	3	Norway; Pål Tyldum; Einar Sagstuen; Ivar Formo; Odd Martinsen	2:09:58.36	+1:58.64
3rd place, bronze medalist(s)	2	Soviet Union; Yevgeny Belyayev; Nikolay Bazhukov; Sergey Savelyev; Ivan Garanin	2:10:51.46	+2:51.74
4	14	Sweden; Benny Södergren; Christer Johansson; Thomas Wassberg; Sven-Åke Lundbäck	2:11:16.88	+3:17.16
5	6	Switzerland; Franz Renggli; Edi Hauser; Heinz Gähler; Fredel Kälin	2:11:28.53	+3:28.81
6	12	United States; Doug Peterson; Tim Caldwell; Bill Koch; Ronny Yeager	2:11:41.35	+3:41.63
7	8	Italy; Renzo Chiocchetti; Tonio Biondini; Ulrico Kostner; Giulio Capitanio	2:12:07.12	+4:07.40
8	9	Austria; Rudolf Horn; Reinhold Feichter; Werner Vogel; Herbert Wachter	2:12:22.80	+4:23.08
9	11	West Germany; Frank Betz; Georg Kandlinger; Walter Demel; Georg Zipfel	2:12:38.96	+4:39.24
10	5	Czechoslovakia; František Šimon; Milan Jarý; Jiří Beran; Stanislav Henych	2:12:49.99	+4:50.27
11	10	France; Daniel Drezet; Jean-Paul Vandel; Yves Blondeau; Jean-Paul Pierrat	2:13:05.26	+5:05.54
12	13	Canada; Bert Bullock; Ernie Lennie; Edward Day; Hans Skinstad	2:15:31.85	+7:32.13
13	7	Poland; Wiesław Gębala; Jan Staszel; Jan Dragon; Władysław Podgórski	2:16:06.63	+8:06.91
14	16	Bulgaria; Lyubomir Toskov; Ivan Lebanov; Khristo Barzanov; Petar Pankov	2:19:45.66	+11:45.94
	1	East Germany; Gerd Hessler; Axel Lesser; Gerhard Grimmer; Gert-Dietmar Klause	DNF	
	15	Turkey; Sacit Özbey; Bahri Yılmaz; Şeref Çınar; Yavuz Özbey	DNF	
