= Stig Jäder =

Swedish cross-country skier

Personal information
- Nationality: Swedish
- Born: 11 August 1954 (age 71) Sandviken, Sweden

Sport
- Sport: Cross-country skiing

Stig Jäder (born 11 August 1954) is a Swedish former cross-country skier. He competed in the 30 km event at the 1980 Winter Olympics.

== Cross-country skiing results ==
=== Olympic Games ===
Year	Age	15 km	30 km	50 km	4 × 10 km relay
1980	25	—	25	DNF	—
