= Giulio Capitanio =

Italian cross-country skier

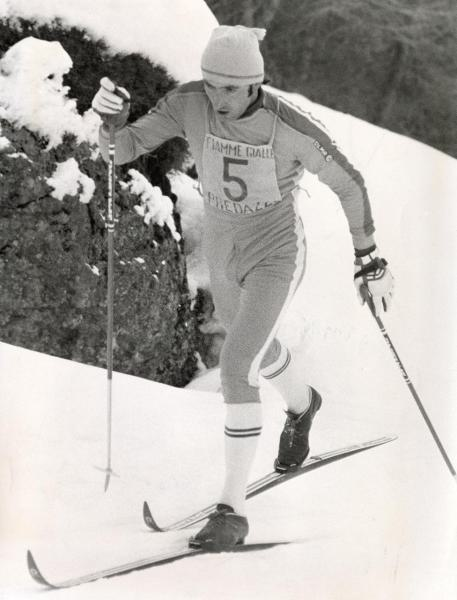

Personal information
- Nationality: Italy
- Born: 6 March 1952 (age 74) Schilpario, Italy

Sport
- Sport: Skiing
- Club: C.S. Carabinieri

World Cup career
- Seasons: 4 – (1982–1985)
- Indiv. starts: 23
- Indiv. podiums: 0
- Team starts: 1
- Team podiums: 0
- Overall titles: 0 – (35th in 1982)

Giulio Capitanio (born Schilpario, 6 March 1952) was an Italian cross-country skier who competed in the late 1970s and early 1980s. Competing in three Winter Olympics in the 4 × 10 km relay, he earned his best finish of sixth at Lake Placid, New York, in 1980.

Capitanio's best World Cup finish was fourth in a 30 km event in Yugoslavia in 1983.

== Cross-country skiing results ==
All results are sourced from the International Ski Federation (FIS).

=== Olympic Games ===
Year	Age	15 km	30 km	50 km	4 × 10 km relay
1976	23	21	28	—	7
1980	27	39	27	19	6
1984	31	24	26	34	7

=== World Championships ===
Year	Age	15 km	30 km	50 km	4 × 10 km relay
1978	25	19	14	21	11
1982	29	39	40	24	—

=== World Cup ===
==== Season standings ====
Season	Age	Overall
1982	30	35
1983	31	36
1984	32	NC
1985	33	NC
