= Sergey Savelyev (skier) =

Russian cross-country skier

Medal record

Men's cross-country skiing

Representing Soviet Union

Olympic Games
Gold medal – first place	1976 Innsbruck	30 km
Bronze medal – third place	1976 Innsbruck	4 × 10 km relay

World Championships
Gold medal – first place	1978 Lahti	30 km

Sergey Petrovich Savelyev (Russian: Серге́й Петро́вич Саве́льев; February 26, 1948 in Raychikhinsk, Amur Oblast – October 29, 2005 in Moscow) was a Russian cross-country skier who represented the Soviet Union.

Savelyev trained at the Armed Forces sports society in Moscow. He won two medals at the 1976 Winter Olympics in Innsbruck with a gold in the 30 km and a bronze in the 4 × 10 km relay. Savelyev also won the 30 km event at the 1978 FIS Nordic World Ski Championships in Lahti. Savelyev was awarded Order of the Badge of Honor (1976).

== Cross-country skiing results ==
All results are sourced from the International Ski Federation (FIS).

=== Olympic Games ===
- 2 medals – (1 gold, 1 bronze)

Year	Age	15 km	30 km	50 km	4 × 10 km relay
1976	27	—	1st	21	3rd
1980	31	—	—	5	—

=== World Championships ===
- 1 medal – (1 gold)

Year	Age	15 km	30 km	50 km	4 × 10 km relay
1978	29	—	1st	23	4
