= Tommy Limby =

Swedish cross-country skier

Medal record

Men's cross-country skiing

Representing Sweden

World Championships
| Gold medal – first place | 1978 Lahti | 4 × 10 km relay |

Tommy Limby (5 September 1947, Gåxsjö, Jämtland – 14 January 2008) was a Swedish cross-country skier who competed in the 1970s. He earned a gold medal in the 4 × 10 km relay at the 1978 FIS Nordic World Ski Championships in Lahti.

In 1974 he participated in the Orsa IF men's team winning the Swedish national relay championship.

Limby finished third in the Vasaloppet in 1977.

He died on 14 January 2008 at the age of 60.

== Cross-country skiing results ==
=== Olympic Games ===
| Year | Age | 15 km | 30 km | 50 km | 4 × 10 km relay |
|---|---|---|---|---|---|
| 1976 | 28 | 23 | 15 | 8 | — |

=== World Championships ===
- 1 medal – (1 gold)

| Year | Age | 15 km | 30 km | 50 km | 4 × 10 km relay |
|---|---|---|---|---|---|
| 1978 | 30 | — | 10 | — | Gold |
