= Pertti Teurajärvi =

Finnish cross-country skier

Personal information
- Nationality: Finland
- Born: February 20, 1951 (age 75) Kolari, Finland

Sport
- Sport: Skiing

World Cup career
- Seasons: 1 – (1982)
- Indiv. starts: 1
- Indiv. podiums: 0
- Team starts: 0
- Overall titles: 0 – (39th in 1982)
Medal record
Men's cross-country skiing
Representing Finland
Olympic Games
Gold medal – first place	1976 Innsbruck	4 × 10 km relay
Bronze medal – third place	1980 Lake Placid	4 × 10 km relay
World Championships
Silver medal – second place	1978 Lahti	4 × 10 km relay

Pertti Teurajärvi (born 20 February 1951 in Kolari) is a Finnish former cross-country skier who competed in the late 1970s and early 1980s. He won two medals in the 4 × 10 km relay at the Winter Olympics with a gold in 1976 and a bronze in 1980.

Teurajärvi also won a silver medal in the 4 × 10 km relay at the 1978 FIS Nordic World Ski Championships in Lahti. His best individual event was fourth in a World Cup event in 1982 in West Germany.

== Doping ban ==
Teurajärvi tested positive for prolintane at the 1982 Finnish Skiing Championships and was subsequently handed a one-year ban from sport for the anti-doping rule violation.

== Cross-country skiing results ==
All results are sourced from the International Ski Federation (FIS).

=== Olympic Games ===
- 2 medals – 1 gold, 1 bronze)

Year	Age	15 km	30 km	50 km	4 × 10 km relay
1976	25	14	—	27	Gold
1980	29	20	—	18	Bronze

=== World Championships ===
- 1 medal – (1 silver)

Year	Age	15 km	30 km	50 km	4 × 10 km relay
1978	27	12	—	15	Silver

=== World Cup ===
==== Season standings ====
Season	Age	Overall
1982	31	39
