= Cross-country skiing at the 1976 Winter Olympics – Men's 30 kilometre =

Men's 30 kilometre at the XII Olympic Winter Games
- Venue: Seefeld
- Dates: 5 February 1976
- Competitors: 69 from 21 nations
- Winning time: 1:30:29.38

Medalists
1st place, gold medalist(s)		Sergey Savelyev; Soviet Union
2nd place, silver medalist(s)		Bill Koch; United States
3rd place, bronze medalist(s)		Ivan Garanin; Soviet Union

The men's 30 kilometre cross-country skiing competition at the 1976 Winter Olympics in Innsbruck, Austria, was held on Thursday 5 February at Seefeld in Tirol.

Each skier started at half a minute intervals, skiing the entire 30 kilometre course.

== Results ==
Rank	Bib	Name	Country	Time	Deficit
1st place, gold medalist(s)	35	Sergey Savelyev	Soviet Union	1:30:29.38	–
2nd place, silver medalist(s)	7	Bill Koch	United States	1:30:57.84	+28.46
3rd place, bronze medalist(s)	14	Ivan Garanin	Soviet Union	1:31:09.29	+39.91
4	2	Juha Mieto	Finland	1:31:20.39	+51.01
5	51	Nikolay Bazhukov	Soviet Union	1:31:33.14	+1:03.76
6	47	Gert-Dietmar Klause	East Germany	1:32:00.91	+1:31.53
7	13	Albert Giger	Switzerland	1:32:17.71	+1:48.33
8	67	Arto Koivisto	Finland	1:32:23.11	+1:53.73
9	63	Odd Martinsen	Norway	1:32:38.91	+2:09.53
10	56	Vasily Rochev	Soviet Union	1:32:39.42	+2:10.04
11	48	Ivar Formo	Norway	1:33:01.68	+2:32.30
12	36	Benny Södergren	Sweden	1:33:10.98	+2:41.60
13	29	Matti Pitkänen	Finland	1:33:44.74	+3:15.36
14	62	Georg Zipfel	West Germany	1:34:04.71	+3:35.33
15	3	Tommy Limby	Sweden	1:34:32.47	+4:03.09
16	37	Gerhard Grimmer	East Germany	1:34:52.15	+4:22.77
17	8	Axel Lesser	East Germany	1:34:53.14	+4:23.76
18	21	Frank Betz	West Germany	1:34:55.54	+4:26.16
19	31	Oddvar Brå	Norway	1:34:59.57	+4:30.19
20	33	Wiesław Gębala	Poland	1:35:09.65	+4:40.27
21	42	Christer Johansson	Sweden	1:35:23.27	+4:53.89
22	40	Juhani Repo	Finland	1:35:31.06	+5:01.68
23	16	Magne Myrmo	Norway	1:35:33.34	+5:03.96
24	5	Jan Staszel	Poland	1:35:46.82	+5:17.44
25	28	Edi Hauser	Switzerland	1:35:50.29	+5:20.91
26	32	Milan Jarý	Czechoslovakia	1:35:52.55	+5:23.17
27	26	Tim Caldwell	United States	1:35:57.97	+5:28.59
28	45	Giulio Capitanio	Italy	1:35:58.29	+5:28.91
29	46	Fredel Kälin	Switzerland	1:36:09.97	+5:40.59
30	23	Hans Skinstad	Canada	1:36:16.95	+5:47.57
31	11	Bert Bullock	Canada	1:36:24.55	+5:55.17
32	34	Herbert Wachter	Austria	1:36:28.48	+5:59.10
33	60	Dieter Meinel	East Germany	1:36:37.35	+6:07.97
34	27	Roberto Primus	Italy	1:36:40.33	+6:10.95
35	68	Sven-Åke Lundbäck	Sweden	1:36:40.86	+6:11.48
36	17	Hans Speicher	West Germany	1:36:52.45	+6:23.07
37	25	Jean-Paul Vandel	France	1:37:11.67	+6:42.29
38	12	Renzo Chiocchetti	Italy	1:37:15.82	+6:46.44
39	6	Reinhold Feichter	Austria	1:37:43.73	+7:14.35
40	38	Walter Demel	West Germany	1:37:44.17	+7:14.79
41	57	Ulrico Kostner	Italy	1:37:49.85	+7:20.47
42	41	Edward Day	Canada	1:38:09.10	+7:39.72
43	65	Yves Blondeau	France	1:38:20.86	+7:51.48
44	49	František Šimon	Czechoslovakia	1:38:34.16	+8:04.78
45	64	Jiří Beran	Czechoslovakia	1:38:39.61	+8:10.23
46	18	Ján Michalko	Czechoslovakia	1:38:40.28	+8:10.90
47	66	Jerzy Koryciak	Poland	1:39:02.46	+8:33.08
48	43	Lyubomir Toskov	Bulgaria	1:39:10.94	+8:41.56
49	24	Petar Pankov	Bulgaria	1:39:27.77	+8:58.39
50	69	Hansüli Kreuzer	Switzerland	1:39:58.44	+9:29.06
51	44	Werner Vogel	Austria	1:40:16.10	+9:46.72
52	53	Chris Haines	United States	1:40:58.43	+10:29.05
53	4	Khristo Barzanov	Bulgaria	1:41:05.91	+10:36.53
54	52	Pierre Salvi	France	1:41:06.69	+10:37.31
55	30	Kiyoshi Hayasaka	Japan	1:41:33.76	+11:04.38
56	59	Reijo Puiras	Canada	1:41:34.43	+11:05.05
57	50	Ryoji Fujiki	Japan	1:42:59.25	+12:29.87
58	61	Franz Gattermann	Austria	1:43:04.88	+12:35.50
59	58	Bela Bodnar	United States	1:43:10.73	+12:41.35
60	20	Maksi Jelenc	Yugoslavia	1:44:20.25	+13:50.87
61	1	Michel Thierry	France	1:44:25.33	+13:55.95
62	55	Bahri Yılmaz	Turkey	1:45:15.78	+14:46.40
63	15	Trausti Sveinsson	Iceland	1:47:48.45	+17:19.07
64	19	Halldór Matthíasson	Iceland	1:50:02.09	+19:32.71
65	10	Marcos Luis Jerman	Argentina	1:50:06.99	+19:37.61
66	39	Ahmet Ünal	Turkey	1:51:14.75	+20:45.37
67	9	Athanassios Koutsougiannis	Greece	2:21:20.64	+50:51.26
	22	Estathios Vogdanos	Greece	DNF	
	54	Władysław Podgórski	Poland	DNF	
