= Juhani Repo =

Finnish cross-country skier

Personal information
- Nationality: Finnish
- Born: 9 January 1948 (age 78) Iisalmi, Finland

Sport
- Sport: Cross-country skiing

Juhani Repo (born 9 January 1948) is a Finnish cross-country skier. He competed at the 1972 Winter Olympics and the 1976 Winter Olympics.

== Cross-country skiing results ==
=== Olympic Games ===
Year	Age	15 km	30 km	50 km	4 × 10 km relay
1972	24	23	—	—	4
1976	28	—	22	9	—
