= Nikolay Bazhukov =

Russian cross-country skier

Medal record

Men's cross-country skiing

Representing the Soviet Union

Olympic Games
Gold medal – first place	1976 Innsbruck	15 km
Gold medal – first place	1980 Lake Placid	4 × 10 km relay
Bronze medal – third place	1976 Innsbruck	4 × 10 km relay

Nikolay Serafimovich Bazhukov (Russian: Николай Серафимович Бажуков, born July 23, 1953 in Troitsko-Pechorsk, Komi ASSR) is a Soviet/Russian cross-country skier who competed from 1976 to 1980. He won the 15 km gold and the 4 × 10 km relay bronze at the 1976 Winter Olympics in Innsbruck, then followed it with a 4 × 10 km relay gold at the 1980 Winter Olympics in Lake Placid, New York. Bazhukov trained at the Armed Forces sports society.

== Cross-country skiing results ==
All results are sourced from the International Ski Federation (FIS).

=== Olympic Games ===
- 3 medals – (2 gold, 1 bronze)

Year	Age	15 km	30 km	50 km	4 × 10 km relay
1976	22	Gold	5	—	Bronze
1980	26	—	14	—	Gold

=== World Championships ===
Year	Age	15 km	30 km	50 km	4 × 10 km relay
1978	24	9	—	9	—
