= Sagstuen =

Sagstuen is a Norwegian surname. Notable people with the surname include:

- Einar Sagstuen (b. 1951), Norwegian cross-country skier
- Tonje Sagstuen (b. 1971), Norwegian handball player
