= Christer Johansson (skier) =

Swedish cross-country skier (born 1950)

Medal record

Men's cross-country skiing

Representing Sweden

World Championships
Gold medal – first place	1978 Lahti	4 × 10 km relay

Christer Johansson (born 11 November 1950 in Bjurholm, Västerbotten) was a former Swedish cross-country skier who competed in the 1970s. He earned a gold medal in the 4 × 10 km relay at the 1978 FIS Nordic World Ski Championships in Lahti. He also participated at the 1976 Winter Olympics in Innsbruck with a 21st place on the 30 km and a fourth place in the 4 × 10 km relay.

== Cross-country skiing results ==
=== Olympic Games ===
Year	Age	15 km	30 km	50 km	4 × 10 km relay
1976	25	—	21	—	4

=== World Championships ===
- 1 medal – (1 gold)

Year	Age	15 km	30 km	50 km	4 × 10 km relay
1978	27	7	—	13	Gold
