= Yevgeny Belyayev =

Russian cross-country skier

Medal record

Men's cross-country skiing

Representing Soviet Union

Olympic Games
Gold medal – first place	1980 Lake Placid	4 ×10 km relay
Silver medal – second place	1976 Innsbruck	15 km
Bronze medal – third place	1976 Innsbruck	4 × 10 km relay

World Championships
Silver medal – second place	1978 Lahti	15 km
Silver medal – second place	1978 Lahti	50 km

Yevgeny Prokopievich Belyayev (Russian: Евге́ний Проко́пьевич Беля́ев) (March 20, 1954 – March 15, 2003) was a Soviet/Russian cross-country skier who competed in the 1970s and 1980s, representing the Soviet Union at the international level. Belyayev trained at VSS Trud in Leningrad until 1981 and at Dynamo in the same city since then. He won the 15 km silver and the 4 × 10 km relay bronze at the 1976 Winter Olympics in Innsbruck, then followed it with a 4 × 10 km relay gold at the 1980 Winter Olympics in Lake Placid, New York.

Belyayev also won two silvers at the 1978 FIS Nordic World Ski Championships in the 15 km and the 50 km.

== Cross-country skiing results ==
All results are sourced from the International Ski Federation (FIS).

=== Olympic Games ===
- 3 medals – (1 gold, 1 silver, 1 bronze)

Year	Age	15 km	30 km	50 km	4 × 10 km relay
1976	21	2nd	—	38	3rd
1980	25	5	11	6	1st

=== World Championships ===
- 2 medals – (2 silver)

Year	Age	15 km	30 km	50 km	4 × 10 km relay
1978	23	2nd	5	2nd	4
