= Bela Bodnar =

American cross-country skier (born 1952)

Personal information
- Born: June 30, 1952 (age 74) Fairbanks, Alaska, United States

Sport
- Sport: Cross-country skiing
- Club: Wyoming Cowboys and Cowgirls

Bela Bodnar (born June 30, 1952) is an American cross-country skier. He competed in the men's 30 kilometre event at the 1976 Winter Olympics.
