= Benny Södergren =

Swedish cross-country skier

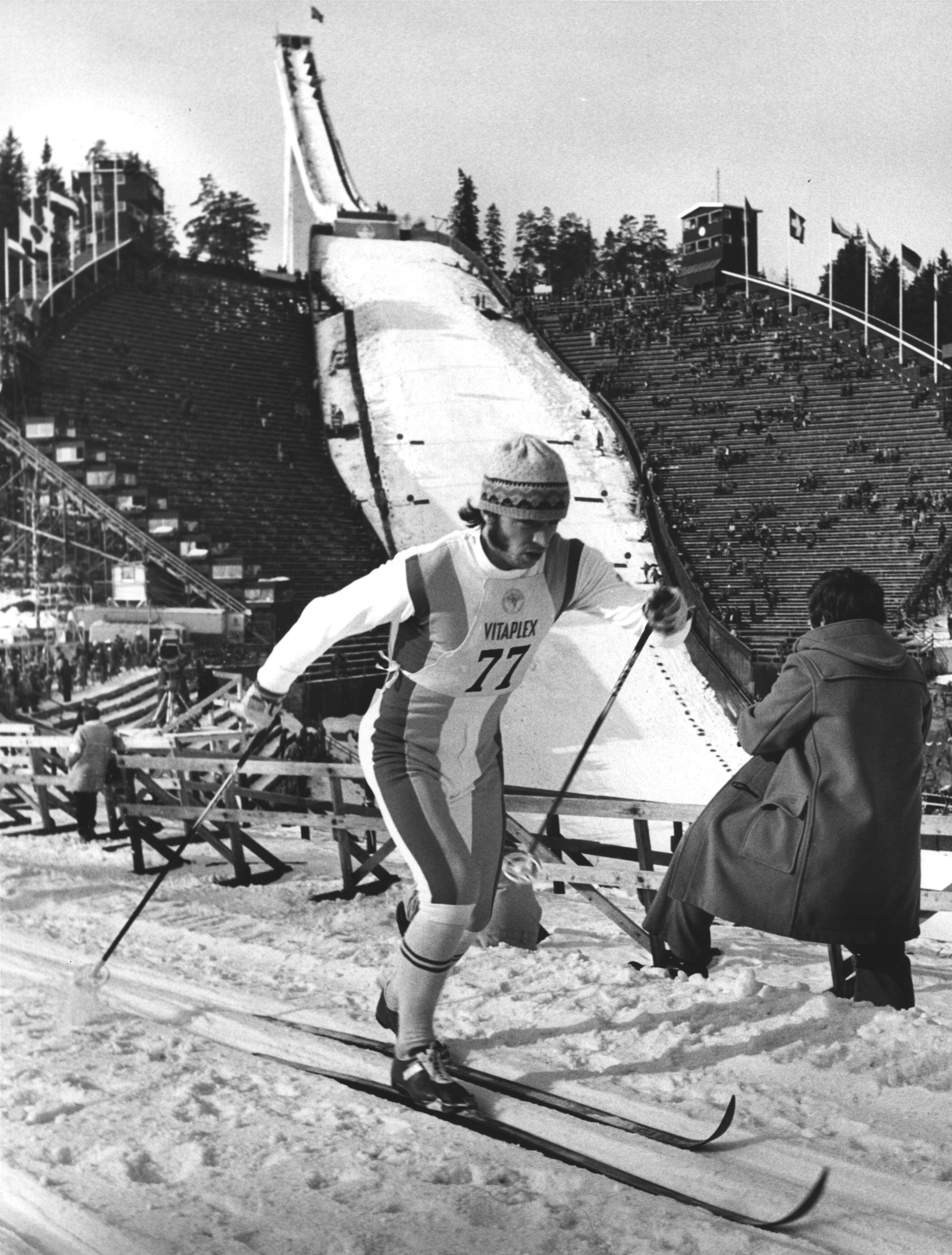
- Södergren in March, 1976

Personal information
- Full name: Erik Benny Södergren
- Born: 26 January 1948 (age 78) Torshälla, Sweden

Sport
- Sport: Cross-country skiing
- Club: Edsbyns SK
Medal record
Men's cross-country skiing
Representing Sweden
Olympic Games
Bronze medal – third place	1976 Innsbruck	50 km

Benny Södergren (born 23 June 1948 in Torshälla) is a former Swedish cross-country skier who competed during the 1970s. He won a bronze medal in the 50 km at the 1976 Winter Olympics in Innsbruck.

== Cross-country skiing results ==
All results are sourced from the International Ski Federation (FIS).

=== Olympic Games ===
- 1 medal – (1 bronze)

Year	Age	15 km	30 km	50 km	4 × 10 km relay
1976	27	13	12	Bronze	4

=== World Championships ===
Year	Age	15 km	30 km	50 km	4 × 10 km relay
1978	29	33	—	—	—
