= Matti Pitkänen =

Finnish cross-country skier

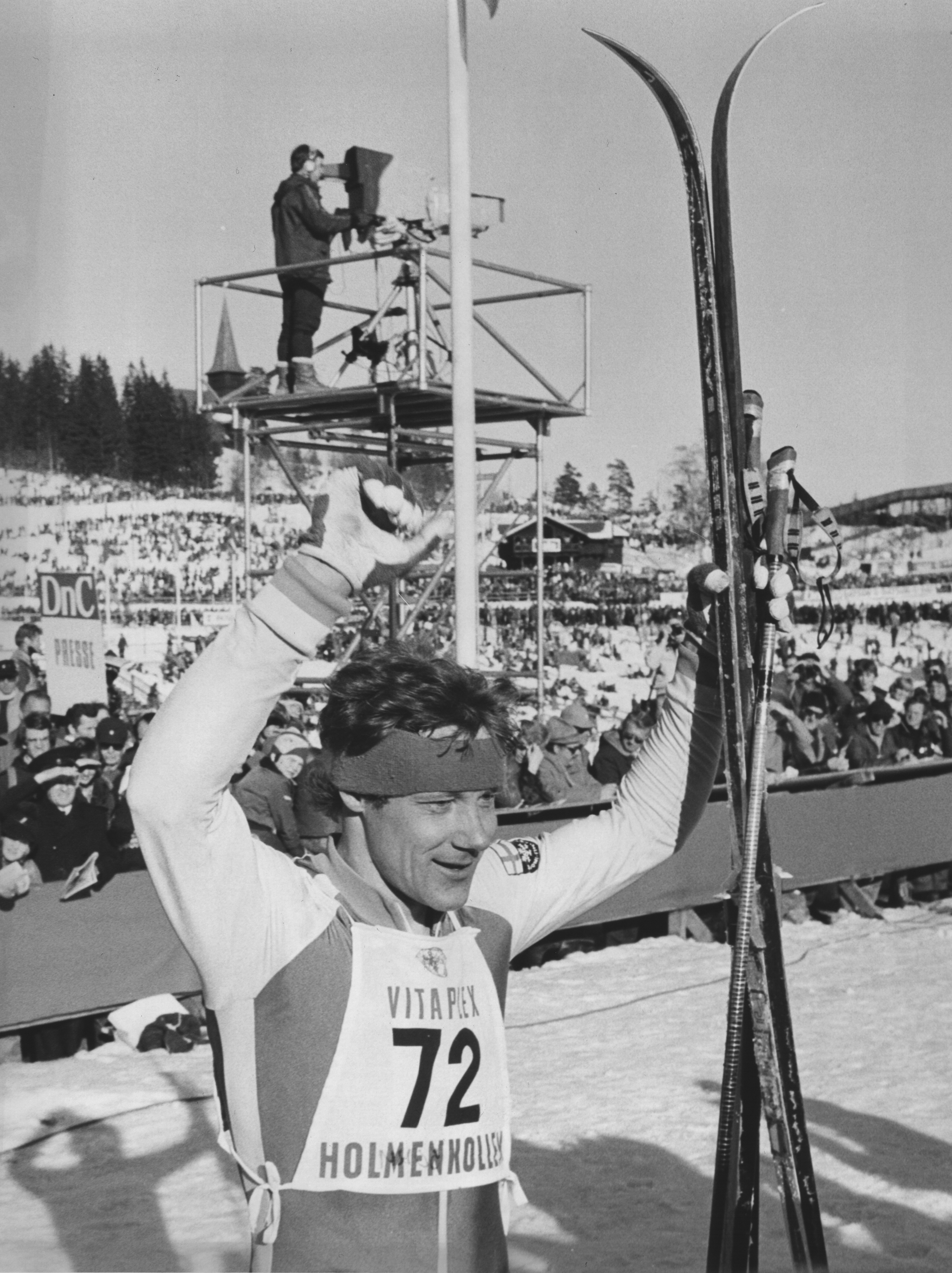
- Pitkänen in March, 1978

Personal information
- Nationality: Finland
- Born: 20 December 1948 (age 77) Ikaalinen, Finland

Sport
- Sport: Skiing
- Club: Ikaalisten Urheilijat

World Cup career
- Seasons: 1 – (1983)
- Indiv. starts: 1
- Indiv. podiums: 0
- Team starts: 0
- Overall titles: 0
Medal record
Men's cross-country skiing
Representing Finland
Olympic Games
Gold medal – first place	1976 Innsbruck	4 × 10 km relay
Bronze medal – third place	1980 Lake Placid	4 × 10 km relay
World Championships
Silver medal – second place	1978 Lahti	4 × 10 km relay

Matti Pitkänen (born 20 December 1948, in Ikaalinen) is a Finnish former cross-country skier who competed in the late 1970s and early 1980s. He won two medals in the 4 × 10 km relay at the Winter Olympics with a gold in 1976 and a bronze in 1980. He also finished sixth in the 30 km at the 1980 Winter Olympics.

Pitkänen also won a silver medal in the 4 × 10 km relay at the 1978 FIS Nordic World Ski Championships in Lahti. He also finished fourth in the 15 km, 30 km, and 50 km events at those same games.

Pitkänen won the 50 km event at the Holmenkollen Ski Festival in 1978.

== Cross-country skiing results ==
All results are sourced from the International Ski Federation (FIS).

=== Olympic Games ===
- 2 medals – 1 gold, 1 bronze)

Year	Age	15 km	30 km	50 km	4 × 10 km relay
1976	27	—	13	—	Gold
1980	31	—	6	11	Bronze

=== World Championships ===
- 1 medal – (1 silver)

Year	Age	15 km	30 km	50 km	4 × 10 km relay
1978	29	4	4	4	Silver

=== World Cup ===
==== Season standings ====
Season	Age	Overall
1983	34	NC
