= Francis Jacot =

Swiss cross-country skier

Personal information
- Nationality: Swiss
- Born: 30 March 1956 (age 70)

Sport
- Sport: Cross-country skiing

Francis Jacot (French: [fʁɑ̃sis ʒako]; born 30 March 1956) is a Swiss cross-country skier. He competed in the men's 30 kilometre event at the 1980 Winter Olympics.
