= Arto Koivisto =

Finnish cross-country skier

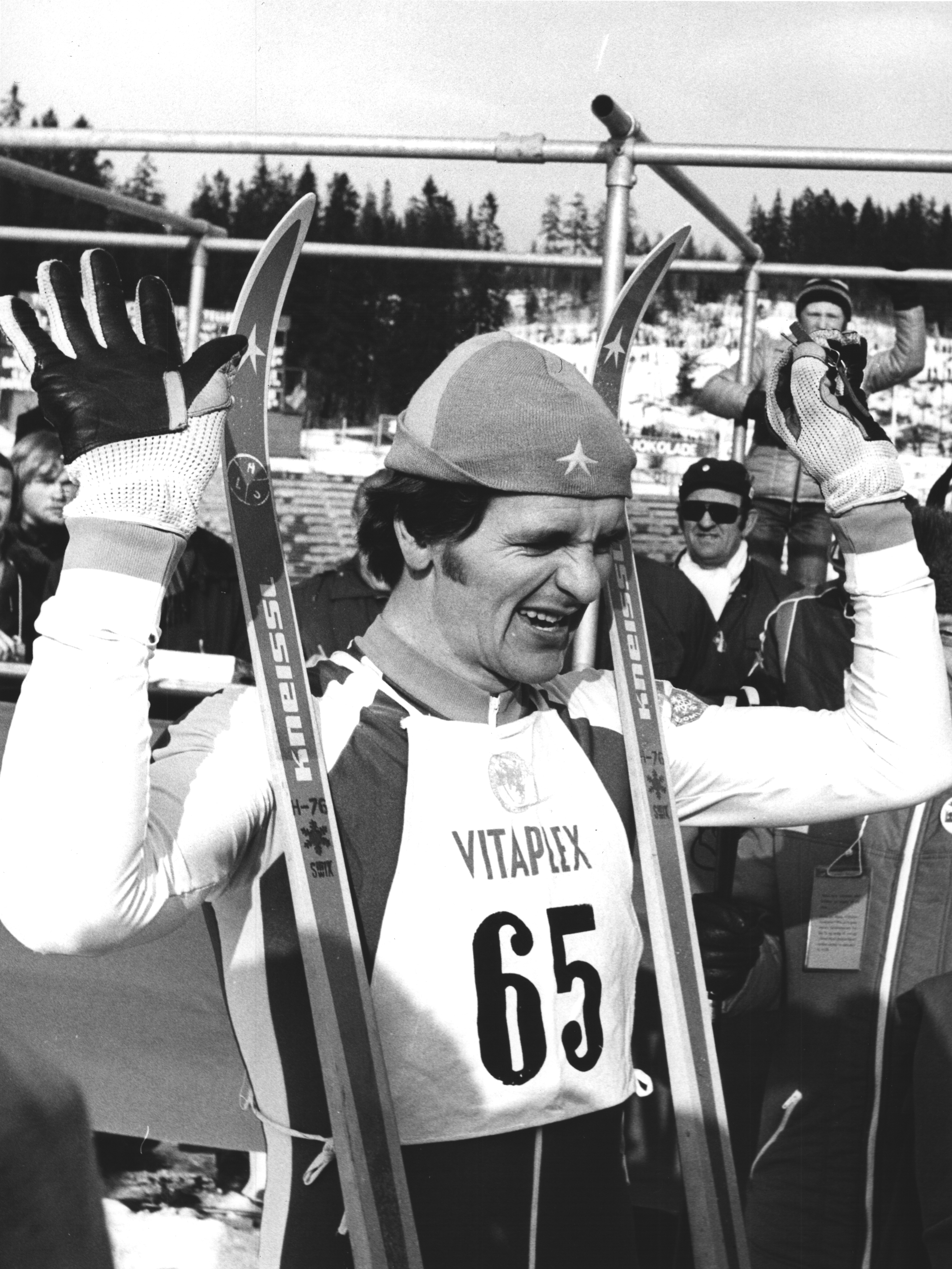

Personal information
- Nationality: Finland
- Born: December 7, 1947 (age 78) Isojoki, Finland

Sport
- Sport: Skiing

World Cup career
- Seasons: 2 – (1983–1984)
- Indiv. starts: 2
- Indiv. podiums: 0
- Team starts: 0
Medal record
Men's cross-country skiing
Representing Finland
Olympic Games
Gold medal – first place	1976 Innsbruck	4 × 10 km relay
Bronze medal – third place	1976 Innsbruck	15 km

Arto Ilmari Koivisto (born 7 December 1947) is a Finnish former cross-country skier who competed in the 1970s. He won the 4 × 10 km relay gold and the 15 km bronze at the 1976 Winter Olympics in Innsbruck.

Koivisto also won the 15 km event at the Holmenkollen ski festival in 1976.

== Doping ban ==
Koivisto tested positive for ephedrine and codine at the 1981 Finnish Skiing Championships, and lost two bronze medals. He claimed the source of the substances was a cough medicine prescribed to him by a doctor, and he got a one-month sanction from the sport.

== Cross-country skiing results ==
All results are sourced from the International Ski Federation (FIS).

=== Olympic Games ===
- 2 medals – (1 gold, 1 bronze)

Year	Age	15 km	30 km	50 km	4 × 10 km relay
1976	28	Bronze	8	10	Gold

=== World Championships ===
Year	Age	15 km	30 km	50 km	4 × 10 km relay
1974	26	20	—	—	—
1978	30	—	29	—	—
1982	34	27	—	—	—

=== World Cup ===
==== Season standings ====
Season	Age	Overall
1983	34	NC
1984	35	NC
