= Juha Mieto =

Finnish cross-country skier (born 1949)

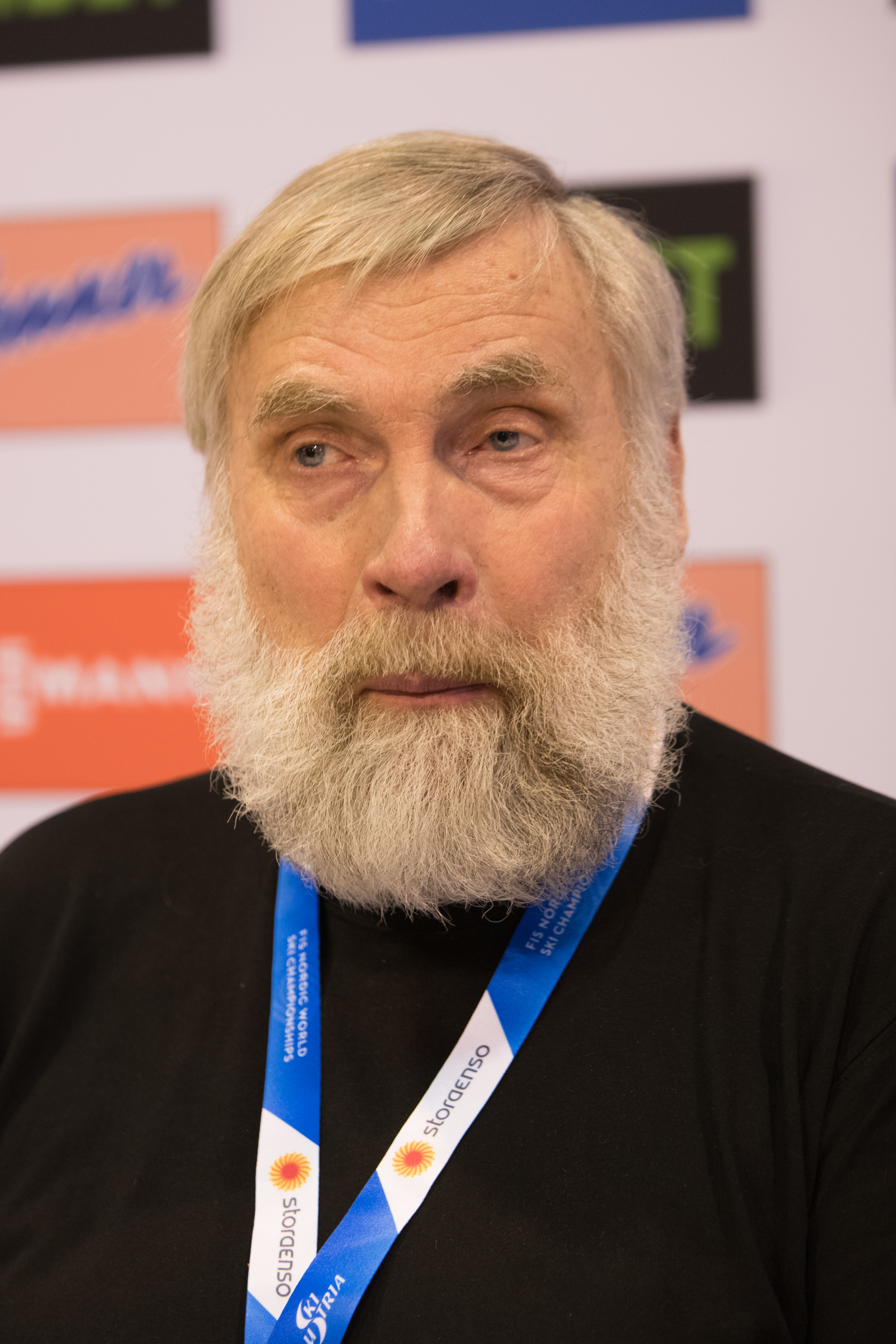
- Mieto in February 2019

Personal information
- Nationality: Finland
- Born: 20 November 1949 (age 76) Kurikka, Finland

Sport
- Sport: Skiing
- Club: Kurikan Ryhti

World Cup career
- Seasons: 3 – (1982–1984)
- Indiv. starts: 11
- Indiv. podiums: 1
- Indiv. wins: 0
- Team starts: 2
- Team podiums: 2
- Team wins: 0
- Overall titles: 0 – (18th in 1984)
Medal record
Men's cross-country skiing
Representing Finland
Olympic Games
Gold medal – first place	1976 Innsbruck	4 × 10 km relay
Silver medal – second place	1980 Lake Placid	15 km
Silver medal – second place	1980 Lake Placid	50 km
Bronze medal – third place	1980 Lake Placid	4 × 10 km relay
Bronze medal – third place	1984 Sarajevo	4 × 10 km relay
World Championships
Silver medal – second place	1974 Falun	30 km
Silver medal – second place	1978 Lahti	4 × 10 km relay
Bronze medal – third place	1978 Lahti	15 km
Bronze medal – third place	1982 Oslo	4 × 10 km relay

Juha Iisakki Mieto (born 20 November 1949) is a Finnish former cross-country skier, who was born in Kurikka. He competed in the 1972, 1976, 1980 and 1984 Olympics and won five medals, including a gold medal in the 4 × 10 km relay in 1976. He also placed fourth three times, losing the 15 km bronze medal in 1972 by 0.06 seconds. He finished second in this event in 1980 in the closest-ever margin of victory in Olympic cross-country skiing, 0.01 seconds, which led the International Ski Federation (FIS) to round all of their times to the nearest 1/10 second in future competitions. Mieto was selected as the Finnish flag bearer at the 1972 Winter Olympics.

Mieto won four medals at the FIS Nordic World Ski Championships, with silvers in the 30 km (1974) and the 4 × 10 km relay (1978), and bronzes in the 15 km (1978) and the 4 × 10 km relay (1982, tied with East Germany). His biggest success as a cross-country skier was at the Holmenkollen ski festival where he won the 50 km once (1973) and the 15 km five times (1973–1975, 1977–1978). He received the Holmenkollen medal in 1974.

After retiring from competitions in 1984 Mieto worked in public relations for several organizations, including Nordea Bank, Kuortane Sports Resort and World Vision. In the 2007 Finnish parliament elections he was a Centre Party candidate in Vaasa constituency. He was elected with 13,768 votes, which was the seventh best result in Finland that year.

== Cross-country skiing results ==
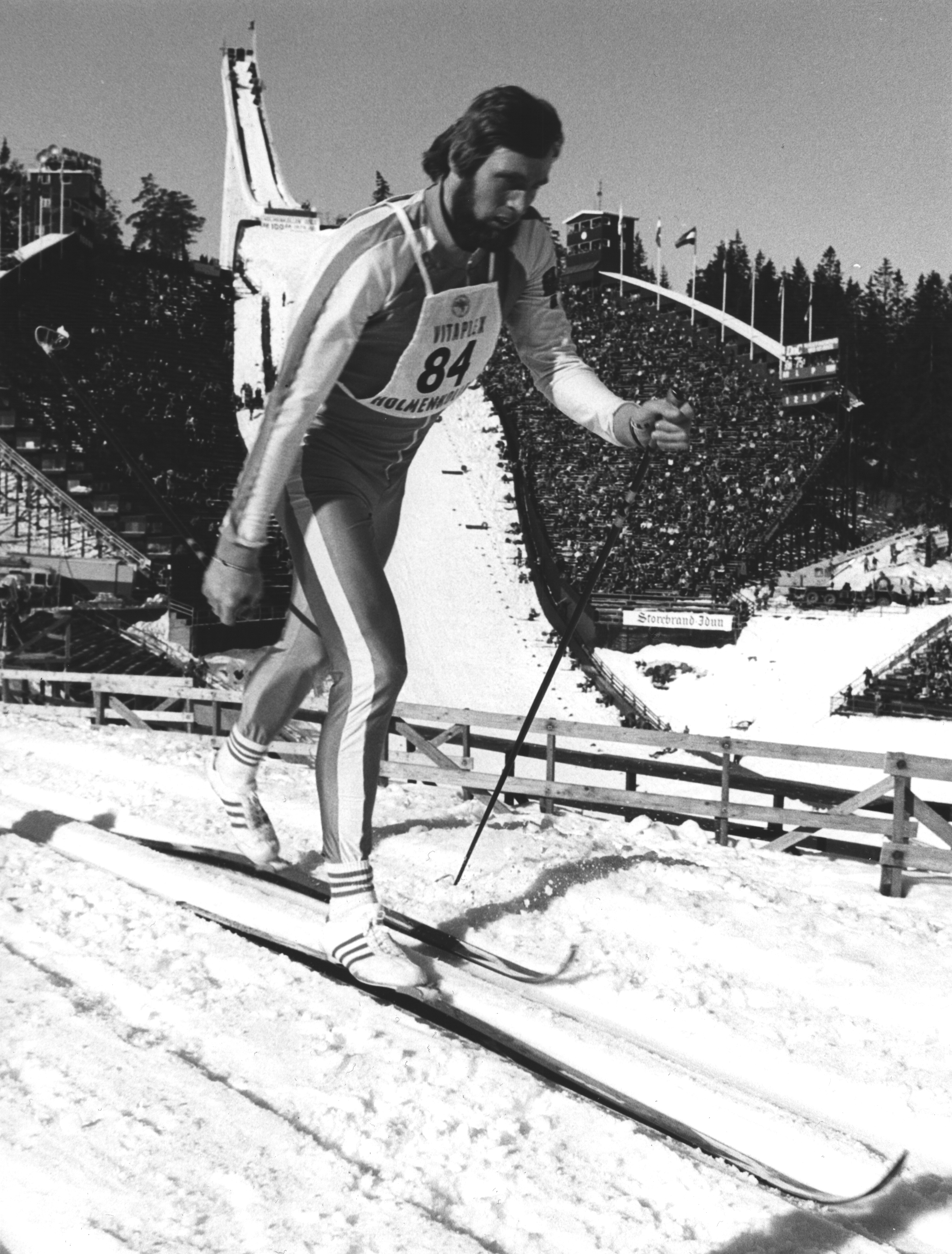
Mieto at the 1978 Holmenkollen Ski Festival, in Oslo, Norway

All results are sourced from the International Ski Federation (FIS).

=== Olympic Games ===
- 5 medals – (1 gold, 2 silver, 2 bronze)

Year	Age	15 km	30 km	50 km	4 × 10 km relay
1972	22	4	—	—	5
1976	26	10	4	34	Gold
1980	30	Silver	7	Silver	Bronze
1984	34	4	8	10	Bronze

=== World Championships ===
- 4 medals – (2 silver, 2 bronze)

Year	Age	15 km	30 km	50 km	4 × 10 km relay
1974	24	4	Silver	35	4
1978	28	Bronze	7	44	Silver
1982	32	6	5	DNF	Bronze
1985	36	52	—	—	—

=== World Cup ===
==== Season standings ====
Season	Age	Overall
1982	32	26
1983	33	28
1984	34	18

==== Individual podiums ====
- 1 podium

No.	Season	Date	Location	Race	Level	Place
1	1982–83	10 February 1983	(Socialist Federal Republic of Yugoslavia) Igman, Yugoslavia	15 km Individual	World Cup	2nd

==== Team podiums ====
- 2 podiums

No.	Season	Date	Location	Race	Level	Place	Teammates
1	1981–82	25 February 1982	Oslo, Norway	4 × 10 km Relay	World Championships^{[1]}	3rd	Härkönen / Karvonen / Kirvesniemi
2	1983–84	16 February 1984	(Socialist Federal Republic of Yugoslavia) Sarajevo, Yugoslavia	4 × 10 km Relay	Olympic Games^{[1]}	3rd	Ristanen / Kirvesniemi / Karvonen

Note: ^{1} Until the 1999 World Championships and the 1994 Olympics, World Championship and Olympic races were included in the World Cup scoring system.
