= Philippe Poirot =

French cross-country skier (born 1958)

Personal information
- Nationality: French
- Born: 3 October 1958 (age 68)

Sport
- Sport: Cross-country skiing

Philippe Poirot (French: [filip pwaʁo]; born 3 October 1958) is a French cross-country skier. He competed in the men's 30 kilometre event at the 1980 Winter Olympics.
