= Ivan Lebanov =

Bulgarian cross-country skier (born 1957)

Personal information
- Born: 10 December 1957 (age 68) Gostun, Bulgaria
Medal record
Men's cross-country skiing
Representing Bulgaria
Olympic Games
Bronze medal – third place	1980 Lake Placid	30 km
Junior World Championships
Gold medal – first place	1977; Sainte-Croix	15 km

Ivan Lebanov (Bulgarian: Иван Лебанов, born 10 December 1957) was a Bulgarian skier who competed from the 1970s to 1985.

He earned a bronze medal in the 30 km event at the 1980 Winter Olympics in Lake Placid, New York, becoming the first Bulgarian to win a Winter Olympic medal.

Lebanov's best World Cup finish was a 10th place in a 15 km event in Switzerland in 1982.
