= Marjan Burgar =

Slovenian biathlete (born 1952)

Personal information
- Nationality: Slovenian
- Born: 15 January 1952 (age 73); Gorje-Bled, Yugoslavia

Sport
- Sport: Biathlon

Marjan Burgar (born 15 January 1952) is a Slovenian biathlete. He competed in the 20 km individual event at the 1980 Winter Olympics.
