= Yugoslavia at the 1980 Winter Olympics =

- Flag of SFR Yugoslavia
- IOC code: YUG
- NOC: Yugoslav Olympic Committee

in Lake Placid
- Competitors: 15 (11 men, 4 women) in 5 sports
- Flag bearer: Bojan Križaj (alpine skiing)
- Medals: Gold 0 Silver 0 Bronze 0 Total 0

Winter Olympics appearances (overview)
- 1924; 1928; 1932; 1936; 1948; 1952; 1956; 1960; 1964; 1968; 1972; 1976; 1980; 1984; 1988; 1992; 1994; 1998; 2002

Other related appearances
- Croatia (1992–); Slovenia (1992–); Bosnia and Herzegovina (1994–); North Macedonia (1998–); Serbia and Montenegro (1998–2006); Montenegro (2010–); Serbia (2010–); Kosovo (2018–)

Athletes from the Socialist Federal Republic of Yugoslavia competed at the 1980 Winter Olympics in Lake Placid, United States.

As Sarajevo would be the host city of the following Winter Olympics, the flag of Yugoslavia was raised at the closing ceremony.

== Alpine skiing ==
Men

Athlete	Event	Race 1		Race 2		Total	
Athlete	Event	Time	Rank	Time	Rank	Time	Rank
Jože Kuralt	Giant Slalom	1:22.68	25	DNF	–	DNF	–
Jure Franko	Giant Slalom	1:21.50	9	1:23.13	16	2:44.63	12
Boris Strel	Giant Slalom	1:21.45	8	1:21.79	5	2:43.24	8
Bojan Križaj	Giant Slalom	1:21.28	7	1:21.25	3	2:42.53	4
Bojan Križaj	Slalom	DSQ	–	–	–	DSQ	–
Janez Zibler	Slalom	DNF	–	–	–	DNF	–
Boris Strel	Slalom	55.44	15	DNF	–	DNF	–
Jože Kuralt	Slalom	55.05	11	52.94	13	1:47.99	13

Women

Athlete	Event	Race 1		Race 2		Total	
Athlete	Event	Time	Rank	Time	Rank	Time	Rank
Anja Zavadlav	Giant Slalom	1:20.54	31	1:31.52	26	2:52.06	26
Metka Jerman	Giant Slalom	1:18.79	28	1:30.42	17	2:49.21	20
Nuša Tome	Giant Slalom	1:18.78	27	1:30.94	21	2:49.72	23
Anja Zavadlav	Slalom	DNF	–	–	–	DNF	–
Metka Jerman	Slalom	DNF	–	–	–	DNF	–
Nuša Tome	Slalom	DNF	–	–	–	DNF	–

== Biathlon ==
Men

Event	Athlete	Misses ^{1}	Time	Rank
10 km Sprint	Marjan Burgar	4	37:37.74	38

Event	Athlete	Time	Penalties	Adjusted time ^{2}	Rank
20 km	Marjan Burgar	1'14:11.68	6	1'20:11.68	35

^{1}A penalty loop of 150 metres had to be skied per missed target.
^{2}One minute added per close miss (a hit in the outer ring), two minutes added per complete miss.

== Cross-country skiing ==
Men

Event	Athlete	Race	
Event	Athlete	Time	Rank
15 km	Tone Ðuričič	47:38.45	46
15 km	Ivo Čarman	45:14.32	41
30 km	Tone Ðuričič	1'38:46.90	46
30 km	Ivo Čarman	1'34:09.59	33

== Figure skating ==
Women

Athlete	CF	SP	FS	Points	Places	Rank
Sanda Dubravčić	13	10	8	170.30	100	11

== Ski jumping ==
Athlete	Event	Jump 1		Jump 2		Total	
Athlete	Event	Distance	Points	Distance	Points	Points	Rank
Bogdan Norčič	Normal hill	55.0	50.7	62.0	73.9	124.6	48
Brane Benedik	Normal hill	62.0	71.4	67.5	78.2	149.6	45
Miran Tepeš	Normal hill	66.0	78.3	71.0	93.3	171.6	44
Brane Benedik	Large hill	77.0	60.5	84.0	77.8	138.3	49
Bogdan Norčič	Large hill	87.0	84.5	97.0	102.9	187.4	38
Miran Tepeš	Large hill	96.0	96.1	89.0	88.3	184.4	40
