= Benedetto Carrara =

Italian cross-country skier

Personal information
- Nationality: Italian
- Born: 4 November 1955 (age 69); Serina, Italy

Sport
- Sport: Cross-country skiing

Benedetto Carrara (born 4 November 1955) is an Italian cross-country skier. He competed in the men's 30 kilometre event at the 1980 Winter Olympics.
