= Ivar Formo =

Norwegian orienteer (1951–2006)

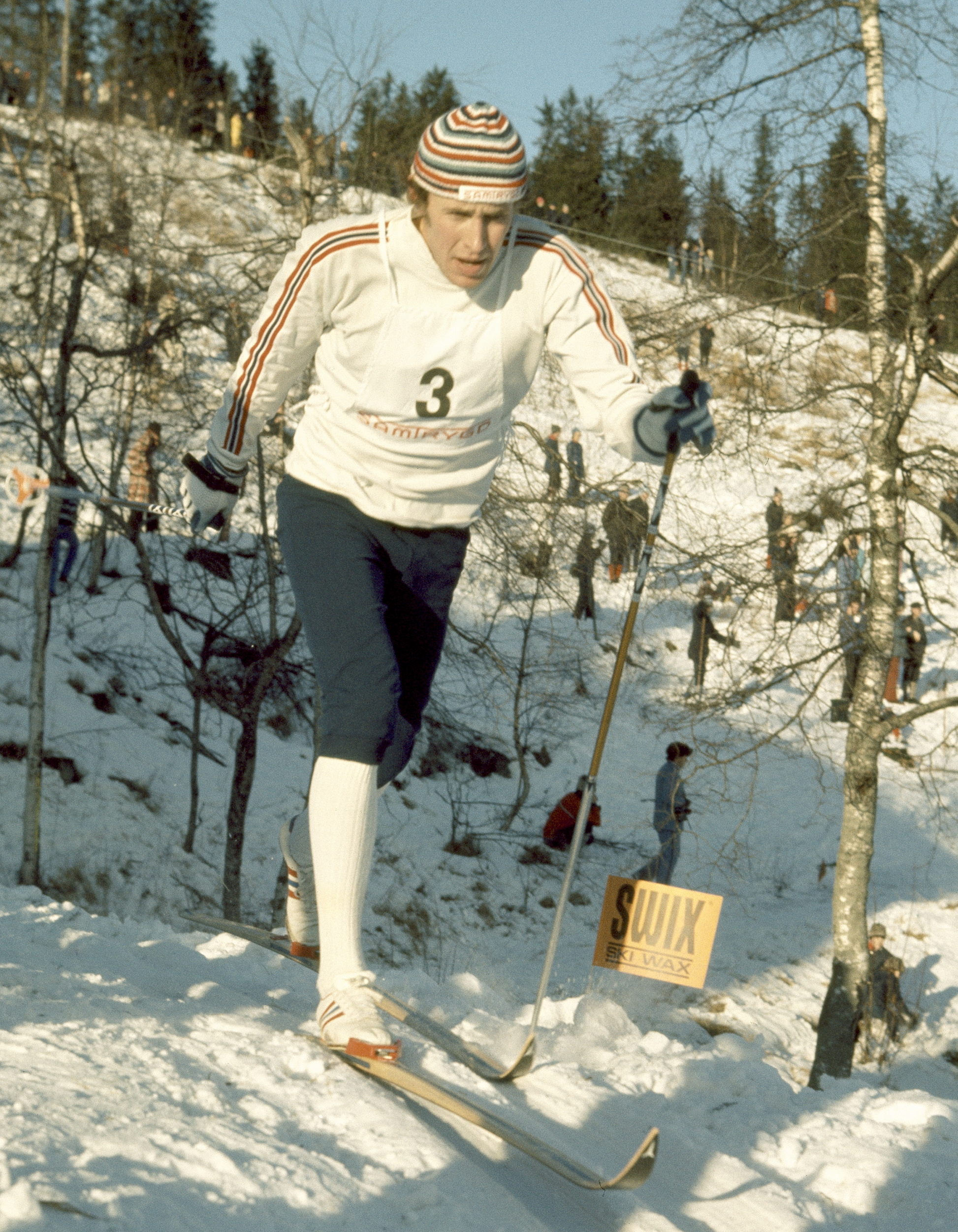
- Ivar Formo in January, 1973

Personal information
- Born: 24 June 1951 Oslo, Norway
- Died: 26 December 2006 (aged 55) Nordmarka, Oslo, Norway
- Life partner: Wenche Jacobsen
Medal record
Representing Norway
Men's cross-country skiing
Olympic Games
Gold medal – first place	1976 Innsbruck	50 km
Silver medal – second place	1972 Sapporo	4 × 10 km relay
Silver medal – second place	1976 Innsbruck	4 × 10 km relay
Bronze medal – third place	1972 Sapporo	15 km
World Championships
Bronze medal – third place	1974 Falun	4 × 10 km relay
Bronze medal – third place	1978 Lahti	4 × 10 km relay
Men's orienteering
World Championships
Bronze medal – third place	1974 Silkeborg	Relay

Ivar Formo (24 June 1951 – 26 December 2006) was a Norwegian cross-country skier and orienteer who competed during the 1970s.

== Career ==
He won four medals at the Winter Olympics. Formo also won two bronze medals at the FIS Nordic World Ski Championships in the 4 × 10 km relay (1974, 1978). Formo also competed in orienteering, winning a bronze medal in the relay at the 1974 world championships, where he also placed ninth in the individual contest.

He represented the club SFK Lyn. He won a number of awards for his accomplishments within sports, notably the Holmenkollen medal in 1975 (shared with Gerhard Grimmer and his good friend and rival Oddvar Brå) and Egebergs Ærespris in 1973.

In 1979 he was part of the Lyn Jukola orienteering relay winning team.

After retiring as an athlete he had a successful career as a businessman, and served as chairman of the cross-country committee (1983–1988) in the International Ski Federation. Formo earned an engineering degree, and was chairman of the board of Ignis at the time of his death.

Formo was found drowned in the lake Store Sandungen in Nordmarka, the forests surrounding Oslo. He had gone jogging and skating through the area and had most likely fallen through the ice. He was survived by his two sons, and his partner during fifteen years, former orienteering competitor Wenche Jacobsen.

== Cross-country skiing results ==
All results are sourced from the International Ski Federation (FIS).

=== Olympic Games ===
- 4 medals – (1 gold, 2 silver, 1 bronze)

Year	Age	15 km	30 km	50 km	4 × 10 km relay
1972	20	Bronze	—	—	Silver
1976	24	5	11	Gold	Silver

=== World Championships ===
- 2 medals – (2 bronze)

Year	Age	15 km	30 km	50 km	4 × 10 km relay
1974	22	6	16	12	Bronze
1978	26	14	—	—	Bronze

Preceded by Bjørn Wirkola	Egebergs Ærespris; 1973	Succeeded by Eystein Weltzien
