= Einar Sagstuen =

Norwegian cross-country skier

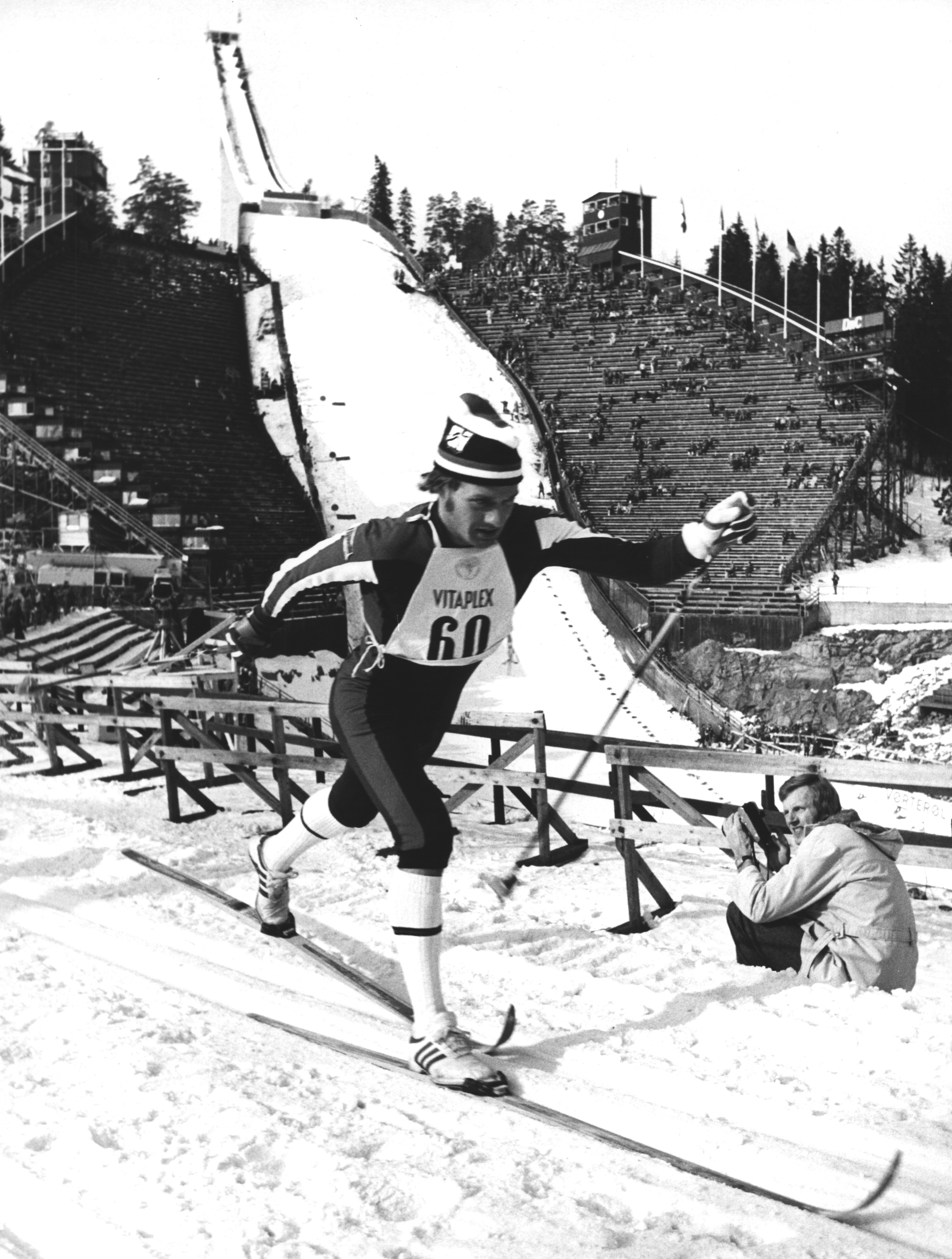
- Einar Sagstuen in March, 1976

Personal information
- Born: 22 March 1951 (age 75) Gjøvik, Norway

Sport
- Sport: Cross-country skiing
- Club: Gjøvik Skiklubb
Medal record
Men's cross-country skiing
Representing Norway
Olympic Games
Silver medal – second place	1976 Innsbruck	4 × 10 km relay

Einar Sagstuen (born March 22, 1951) is a Norwegian cross-country skier who competed during the 1970s. He won the silver medal in the 4 × 10 km relay at the 1976 Winter Olympics in Innsbruck.

== Cross-country skiing results ==
=== Olympic Games ===
- 1 medal – (1 silver)

Year	Age	15 km	30 km	50 km	4 × 10 km relay
1976	24	—	—	12	Silver
