= Yves Blondeau =

French skier (born 1951)

Personal information
- Nationality: French
- Born: 29 April 1951 (age 73)

Sport
- Sport: Biathlon, cross-country skiing

Yves Blondeau (born 29 April 1951) is a French skier. He competed at the 1976 Winter Olympics and the 1980 Winter Olympics.
