= Gaudenz Ambühl =

Swiss cross-country skier

Personal information
- Nationality: Swiss
- Born: 11 May 1954 (age 70)

Sport
- Sport: Cross-country skiing

Gaudenz Ambühl (born 11 May 1954) is a Swiss cross-country skier. He competed in the men's 30 kilometre event at the 1980 Winter Olympics.
