= Josef Schneider (skier) =

German cross-country skier (born 1957)

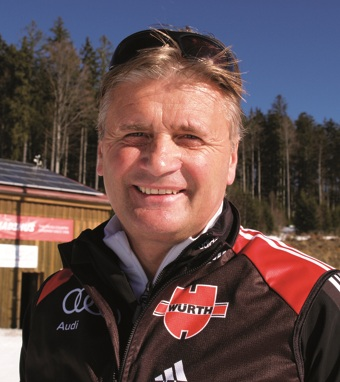
- Josef Schneider in 2011

Personal information
- Nationality: German
- Born: 26 December 1957 (age 67); Spiegelau, West Germany

Sport
- Sport: Cross-country skiing

Josef Schneider (born 26 December 1957) is a German cross-country skier. He competed at the 1980 Winter Olympics and the 1984 Winter Olympics.
