= Hans-Ueli Kreuzer =

Swiss cross-country skier (born 1950)

Personal information
- Nationality: Swiss
- Born: 20 April 1950 (age 76)

Sport
- Sport: Cross-country skiing

Hans-Ueli Kreuzer (born 20 April 1950) is a Swiss cross-country skier. He competed at the 1972, 1976 and 1980 Winter Olympics.
