= Ivan Garanin =

Soviet cross-country skier (born 1945)

Medal record

Men's cross-country skiing

Representing Soviet Union

Olympic Games
Bronze medal – third place	1976 Innsbruck	30 km
Bronze medal – third place	1976 Innsbruck	4 x 10 km

World Championships
Silver medal – second place	1974 Falun	4 x 10 km

Ivan Ivanovich Garanin (Russian: Иван Иванович Гаранин, born August 1, 1945) is a former cross-country skier who represented the Soviet Union.

Garanin trained at VSS Enbek in Rudni, Kostanay Province. At the 1976 Winter Olympics in Innsbruck, Garanin took bronze medals in the 30 km and the 4 x 10 km relay. He later won the Vasaloppet, in 1977.

Garanin won a silver medal in the 4 x 10 km relay at the 1974 FIS Nordic World Ski Championships in Falun.
