= Roberto Primus =

Italian cross-country skier

Personal information
- Nationality: Italian
- Born: 20 July 1949 (age 76) Paluzza, Italy

Sport
- Sport: Cross-country skiing

Roberto Primus (born 20 July 1949) is an Italian cross-country skier. He competed at the 1976 Winter Olympics and the 1980 Winter Olympics.

== Biography ==
Born in 1949 in Paluzza, in the Province of Udine, at the World Championships of Štrbské Pleso 1970 he finished 6th in 2:10:10.70 in the 4 × 10 km relay with Ulrico Kostner, Franco Nones and Gianfranco Stella.

At age 26, he competed in the Olympic Games of 1976, finishing 36th with a time of 47:29.02 in the 15 km, 34th in 1:36:40.33 in the 30 km, and did not finish the 50 km race.

Four years later, at age 30, he again took part in the Olympics, those of 1980, finishing 43rd with a time of 1:37:55.47 in the 30 km and 25th in 2:38:10.10 in the 50 km.
