= Doug Peterson (cross-country skier) =

American cross-country skier (born 1953)

Personal information
- Born: May 11, 1953 (age 73) Minneapolis, Minnesota, United States

Sport
- Sport: Cross-country skiing

Doug Peterson (born May 11, 1953) is an American cross-country skier. He competed at the 1976 Winter Olympics and the 1980 Winter Olympics.
