= Tone Đurišič =

Slovenian cross-country skier

Personal information
- Nationality: Slovenian
- Born: 13 July 1961 (age 63); Mojstrana, Yugoslavia

Sport
- Sport: Cross-country skiing

Tone Đurišič (born 13 July 1961) is a Slovenian cross-country skier. He competed for Yugoslavia in the men's 15 kilometre event at the 1980 Winter Olympics.
