= Stan Dunklee =

American cross-country skier (born 1954)

Personal information
- Nationality: American
- Born: August 14, 1954 (age 71) Brattleboro, Vermont, United States

Sport
- Sport: Cross-country skiing

Stan Dunklee (born August 14, 1954) is an American cross-country skier. He competed at the 1976 Winter Olympics and the 1980 Winter Olympics. He is the father of American biathlete Susan Dunklee.
