= Peter Zipfel =

West German cross-country skier (born 1956)

Peter Zipfel (born 20 October 1956 in Freiburg, Baden-Württemberg) was a West German cross-country skier who competed from 1976 to 1984. His best finish at the Winter Olympics was fourth in the 4 x 10 km relay at Lake Placid, New York, in 1980.

Zipfel was also 15 km national champion three times (1976, 1977, 1981).
