= Jiří Švub =

Czech cross-country skier

Personal information
- Nationality: Czech
- Born: 12 September 1958; Jeseník, Czechoslovakia
- Died: 19 August 2013 (aged 54); Banská Bystrica, Slovakia

Sport
- Sport: Cross-country skiing

Jiří Švub (12 September 1958 – 19 August 2013) was a Czech cross-country skier. He competed in the men's 15 kilometre event at the 1980 Winter Olympics.
