= Dieter Notz =

German cross-country skier (born 1955)

Personal information
- Nationality: German
- Born: 18 September 1955 (age 70) Bad Urach, West Germany

Sport
- Sport: Cross-country skiing

Dieter Notz (born 18 September 1955) is a German cross-country skier. He competed in the men's 15 kilometre event at the 1980 Winter Olympics. He also competed in long-distance running, placing tenth in the short race at the 1985 World Mountain Running Trophy, 20th at the 1988 Berlin Marathon, and seventh at the Munich Marathon that same year.
