= Paul Fargeix =

French cross-country skier (born 1955)

Personal information
- Nationality: French
- Born: 2 June 1955 (age 69)

Sport
- Sport: Cross-country skiing

Paul Fargeix (born 2 June 1955) is a French cross-country skier. He competed in the men's 15 kilometre event at the 1980 Winter Olympics.
