= Eduard Hauser (cross-country skier) =

Swiss cross-country skier (born 1948)

Olympic medal record

Men's cross-country skiing
Bronze medal – third place	1972 Sapporo	4 x 10km Relay

Eduard Hauser (born 26 November 1948) is a former Swiss cross-country skier who competed in the early 1970s. He won a bronze in the 4 x 10 km cross-country skiing relay at the 1972 Winter Olympics in Sapporo. He also competed at the 1976 Winter Olympics and the 1980 Winter Olympics.
