= Jean-Paul Pierrat =

French cross-country skier

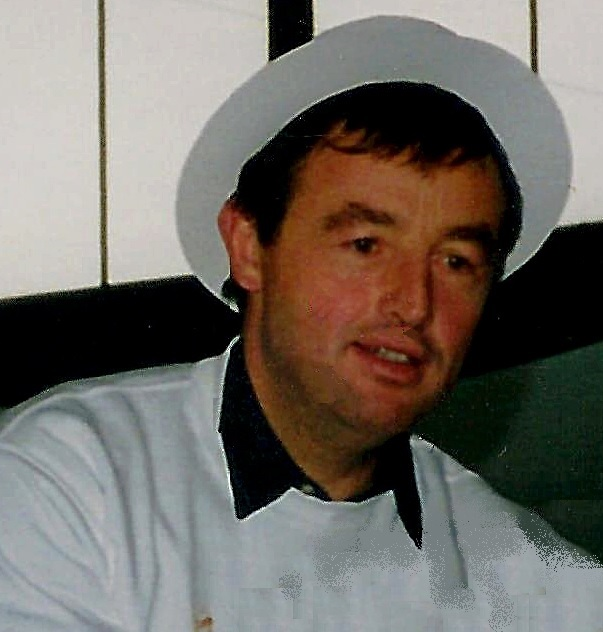

Personal information
- Born: 3 July 1952 (age 74) Xonrupt-Longemer, France

Sport
- Sport: Skiing

World Cup career
- Seasons: 1982
- Indiv. starts: 8
- Indiv. podiums: 1
- Indiv. wins: 0
- Team starts: 0
- Overall titles: 0 – (4th in 1982)
Medal record
Men's cross-country skiing
Representing France
World Championships
| Bronze medal – third place | 1978 Lahti | 50 km |

Jean-Paul Pierrat (born July 3, 1952 in Xonrupt-Longemer, Vosges) is a former French cross-country skier who competed in the late 1970s and early 1980s. He is the brother of Claude Pierrat.

Pierrat won the Marcialonga in 1977, and he won the bronze medal in the 50 km event at the 1978 FIS Nordic World Ski Championships in Lahti, becoming the first person from France to win a medal at the championships.

Pierrat's best career World Cup finish was a second in a 30 km event in Italy in 1982.

== World Cup results ==
All results are sourced from the International Ski Federation (FIS).

=== World Cup standings ===
| Season | Age | Season standings |
| Season | Age | Overall |
|---|---|---|
| 1982 | 30 | 4 |

=== Individual podiums ===
- 1 podium

| No. | Season | Date | Location | Race | Level | Place |
|---|---|---|---|---|---|---|
| 1 | 1981–82 | 24 January 1982 | Brusson, Italy | 30 km | World Cup | 2nd |
