= Khristo Barzanov =

Bulgarian cross-country skier (born 1956)

Personal information
- Nationality: Bulgarian
- Born: 19 August 1956 (age 70) Govedartsi, Bulgaria

Sport
- Sport: Cross-country skiing

Khristo Barzanov (Bulgarian: Христо Бързанов, born 19 August 1956) is a Bulgarian cross-country skier. He competed at the 1976 Winter Olympics, the 1980 Winter Olympics and the 1984 Winter Olympics.
