= Michel Thierry (skier) =

French cross-country skier (born 1954)

Personal information
- Nationality: French
- Born: 29 August 1954 (age 70)

Sport
- Sport: Cross-country skiing

Michel Thierry (born 29 August 1954) is a French cross-country skier. He competed at the 1976 Winter Olympics and the 1980 Winter Olympics.
