= Mount Van Hoevenberg =

Mountain in the U.S. state of New York

- Location within New York Adirondack Park Location within the United States

Highest point
- Elevation: 2,939 ft (896 m)
- Prominence: 627 m (2,057 ft)
- Coordinates: 44°12′36″N 73°55′46″W

Geography
- Location: North Elba, Essex County, near Lake Placid, New York, U.S.
- Parent range: Adirondack Mountains
- Topo map: USGS North Elba

Mount Van Hoevenberg is a mountain summit located in the Adirondack Mountains in the Town of North Elba, Essex County, New York, about 9 miles (15 km) east-southeast of the village of Lake Placid. Named for Henry Van Hoevenberg (1849–1918; not to be confused with the American football player Henry Van Hoevenberg), the mountain is best known as the location of a winter sports complex containing bobsleigh, luge, and skeleton tracks, plus a network of cross-country ski trails, which was used to host events during the 1932 (bobsleigh) and 1980 Winter Olympics (bobsleigh, luge, cross-country skiing, and biathlon).

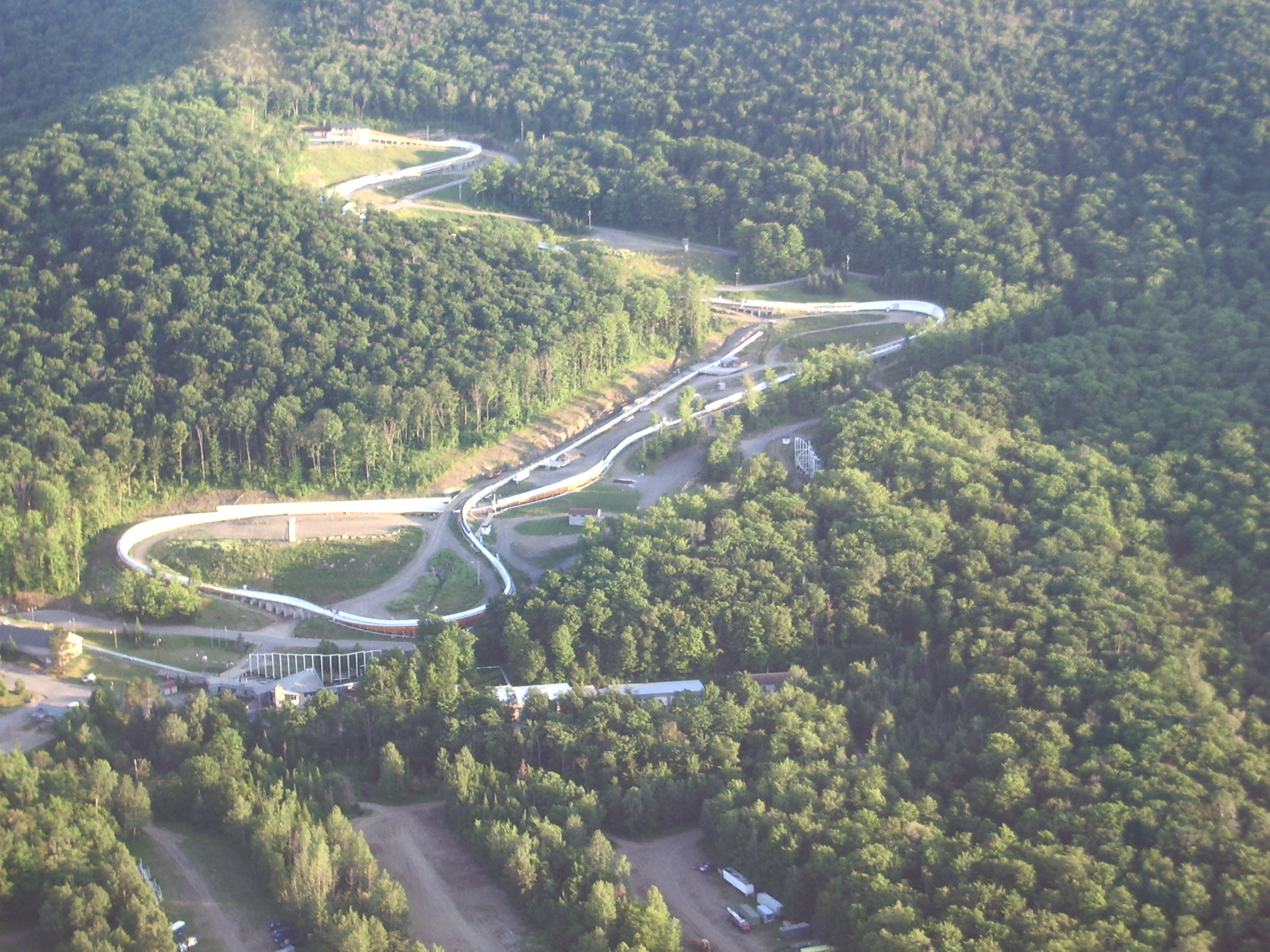
Aerial view of the current bobsleigh, luge, & skeleton track

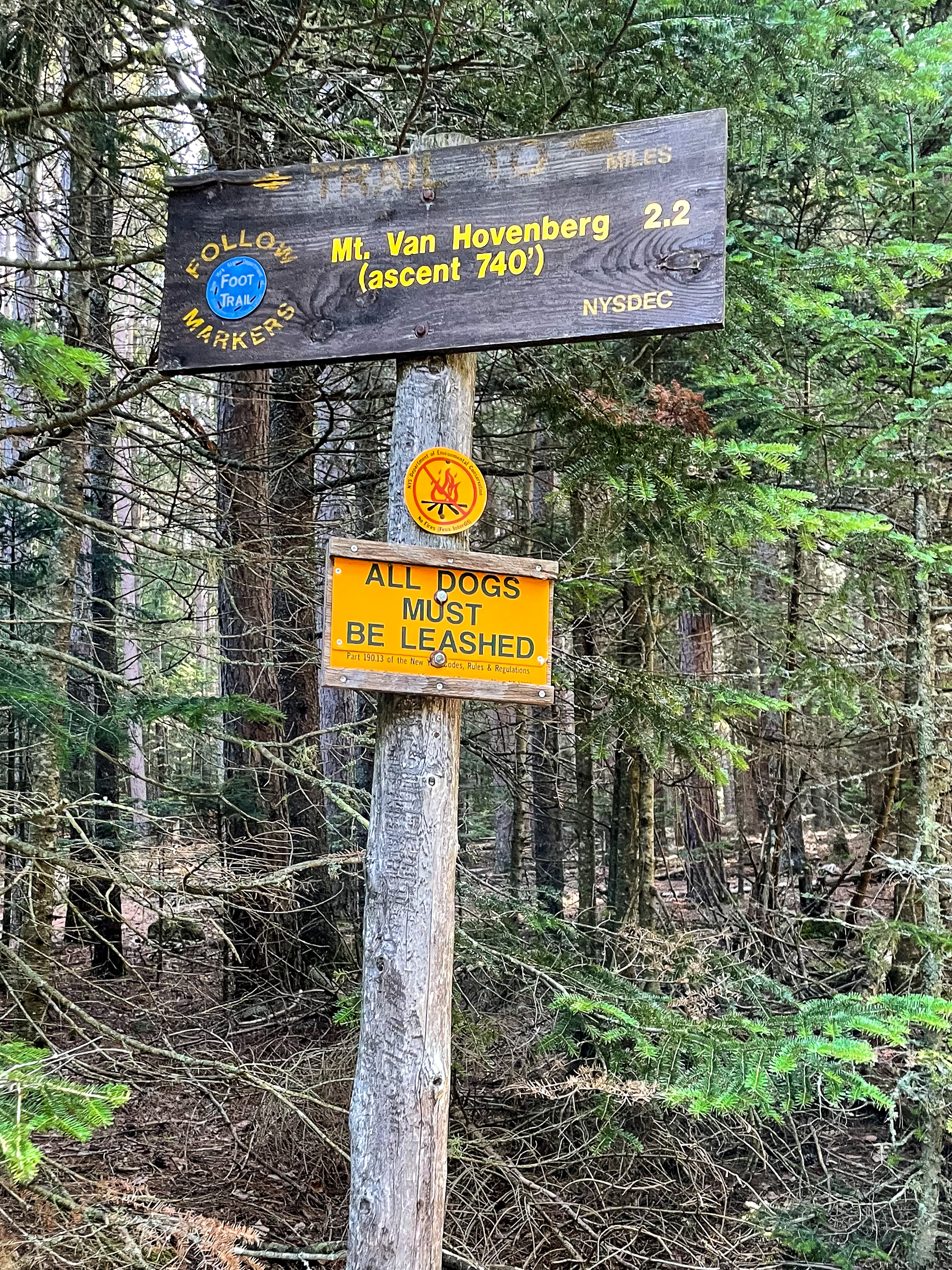
Trailhead marker for the Mt. Van Hoevenberg Trail, at Meadows Road

Mount Van Hoevenberg stands within the watershed of the West Branch of the Ausable River, which drains into Lake Champlain, thence into Canada's Richelieu River, the Saint Lawrence River, and into the Gulf of Saint Lawrence. The southwest slopes of Mt. Van Hoevenberg drain directly into the West Branch. The northern and southern slopes of Van Hoevenberg drain into the North and South Meadow Brooks, respectively — tributaries of the West Branch.

The mountain is part of the Olympic Regional Development Authority (ORDA). ORDA maintains the cross-country ski and biathlon trail system originally used in the 1980 Olympics.

During the summer, the mountain is used for hiking and mountain biking.

In 2023, the Mount Van Hoevenberg Sports Complex was expanded in preparation for the 2023 Winter World University Games. The expansion of the complex unintentionally encroached on approximately 323 acres (131 ha) of the adjacent Adirondack Forest Preserve, in violation of the Constitution of New York. To remedy this issue, state legislators introduced an amendment to the constitution, which would retroactively approve the Mount Van Hoevenberg Sports Complex expansion and transfer 2,500 acres (1,000 ha) of private land to the Adirondack Forest Preserve. 2025 Proposal 1, a referendum approving the amendment, passed narrowly in November 2025.
