= Jiří Beran (skier) =

Czech cross-country skier

Personal information
- Nationality: Czech
- Born: 18 January 1952 (age 73); Náchod, Czechoslovakia

Sport
- Sport: Cross-country skiing

Jiří Beran (born 18 January 1952) is a Czech cross-country skier. He competed at the 1976 Winter Olympics and the 1980 Winter Olympics.
