= František Šimon =

Czech cross-country skier

Personal information
- Nationality: Czech
- Born: 28 April 1953 (age 72) Nové Město na Moravě, Czechoslovakia

Sport
- Sport: Cross-country skiing

František Šimon (born 28 April 1953) is a Czech cross-country skier. He competed at the 1976 Winter Olympics and the 1980 Winter Olympics.
