= Cross-country skiing at the Winter Olympics =

- IOC Code: CCS
- Governing body: FIS
- Events: 12 (men: 6; women: 6)

Winter Olympics
- 1924; 1928; 1932; 1936; 1948; 1952; 1956; 1960; 1964; 1968; 1972; 1976; 1980; 1984; 1988; 1992; 1994; 1998; 2002; 2006; 2010; 2014; 2018; 2022; 2026
- Medalists; men; women

Cross-country skiing has been contested at the Winter Olympic Games since the first Winter Games in 1924 in Chamonix, France. The women's events were first contested at the 1952 Winter Olympics.

== Summary ==
Games	Year	Events	Best Nation
1	1924	2	Norway (1)
2	1928	2	Norway (2)
3	1932	2	Finland (1)
4	1936	3	Sweden (1)
5	1948	3	Sweden (2)
6	1952	4	Finland (2)
7	1956	6	Soviet Union (1)
8	1960	6	Sweden (3)
9	1964	7	Soviet Union (2)
10	1968	7	Norway (3)
11	1972	7	Soviet Union (3)
12	1976	7	Soviet Union (4)
13	1980	7	Soviet Union (5)

Games	Year	Events	Best Nation
14	1984	8	Finland (3)
15	1988	8	Soviet Union (6)
16	1992	10	Norway (4)
17	1994	10	Norway (5)
18	1998	10	Russia (1)
19	2002	12	Norway (6)
20	2006	12	Sweden (4)
21	2010	12	Norway (7)
22	2014	12	Norway (8)
23	2018	12	Norway (9)
24	2022	12	Norway (10)
25	2026	12	Norway (11)

== Events ==
C = classical, F = freestyle, m = mass start, p = pursuit, s = skiathlon

=== Men's ===
Event	24	28	32	36	48	52	56	60	64	68	72	76	80	84	88	92	94	98	02	06	10	14	18	22	26	Years
10 km																C	C	C							F	4
18 km/15 km	•	•	•	•	•	•	•	•	•	•	•	•	•	•	C				C	C	F	C	F	C		21
30 km							•	•	•	•	•	•	•	•	C	C	F	C	Fm							13
50 km	•	•	•	•	•	•	•	•	•	•	•	•	•	•	F	F	C	F	C	Fm	Cm	Fm	Cm	Fm	Cm	25
4 x 10/7.5 km				•	•	•	•	•	•	•	•	•	•	•	•	•	•	•	•	•	•	•	•	•	•	22
Combined/Double pursuit/Skiathlon																Fp	Fp	Fp	p	s	s	s	s	s	s	10
Individual sprint																			F	F	C	F	C	F	C	7
Team sprint																				C	F	C	F	C	F	6
Total Events	2	2	2	3	3	3	4	4	4	4	4	4	4	4	4	5	5	5	6	6	6	6	6	6	6	108

=== Women's ===
Event	24	28	32	36	48	52	56	60	64	68	72	76	80	84	88	92	94	98	02	06	10	14	18	22	26	Years
5 km									•	•	•	•	•	•	C	C	C	C								10
10 km						•	•	•	•	•	•	•	•	•	C				C	C	F	C	F	C	F	17
15 km																C	F	C	Fm							4
20 km/30 km/50 km														•	F	F	C	F	C	Fm	Cm	Fm	Cm	Fm	Cm	12
3/4 x 5 km/4 x 7.5 km							•	•	•	•	•	•	•	•	•	•	•	•	•	•	•	•	•	•	•	19
Combined/Double pursuit/Skiathlon																Fp	Fp	Fp	p	s	s	s	s	s	s	10
Individual sprint																			F	F	C	F	C	F	C	7
Team sprint																				C	F	C	F	C	F	6
Total Events	0	0	0	0	0	1	2	2	3	3	3	3	3	4	4	5	5	5	6	6	6	6	6	6	6	85

== Medal table ==
Sources (after the 2022 Winter Olympics):
Accurate as of 2026 Winter Olympics.

Rank	Nation	Gold	Silver	Bronze	Total
1	Norway	59	42	39	140
2	Sweden	37	31	26	94
3	Soviet Union	25	22	21	68
4	Finland	22	27	38	87
5	Russia	14	10	9	33
6	Italy	9	14	15	38
7	ROC (ROC)	4	4	3	11
8	Estonia	4	2	1	7
9	Switzerland	4	1	5	10
10	Germany	3	10	5	18
11	Unified Team	3	2	4	9
12	Poland	2	1	2	5
13	East Germany	2	1	1	4
14	Canada	2	1	0	3
15	Czech Republic	1	5	3	9
16	United States	1	4	2	7
17	Austria	1	2	3	6
18	Kazakhstan	1	2	1	4
19	France	0	4	4	8
20	Olympic Athletes from Russia	0	3	5	8
21	Czechoslovakia	0	1	4	5
22	Slovenia	0	0	2	2
23	Bulgaria	0	0	1	1
Totals (23 entries)		194	189	194	577

Notes

- 2 gold medals and no silver were awarded at 2002 men's 2 × 10 kilometre pursuit.
- 2 bronze medals were awarded at 2018 women's 10 kilometre freestyle.

== Number of cross-country skiers by nation ==
Nation	24	28	32	36	48	52	56	60	64	68	72	76	80	84	88	92	94	98	02	06	10	14	18	22	26	Years
Algeria																				1	1					2
Andorra																				1	1		1			3
Argentina								1				3	3	5	1	5				1	1	1	2			10
Armenia																		1	2	2	2	3	3			6
Australia						2		1		1			1	2	2	2	2	2		3	3	4	6			13
Austria		1	3	5	8	10	4		9	5	4	7		4	8	6	1	7	7	7	1	8	7			20
Belarus																	9	10	14	7	7	6	9			7
Belgium																							1	1		2
Bermuda																					1	1	1			3
Bosnia and Herzegovina																	1			2	2	2	2			5
Brazil																			2	2	2	2	2			5
Bulgaria				4	2	6	4	4	6	5	2	4	2	4	5	6	4	2	3	1	3	4	3			20
Canada		2	7	4	2	2	1	2	4	4	8	10	5	4	11	11	1	10	6	12	13	13	11			22
Chile																						1	2			2
China													2	8	3	3		4	3	20	5	4	4			10
Costa Rica														1	1				1	1						4
Croatia																1	2	1	3	4	2	2	4			8
Czechoslovakia	6	6	4	6	9	5	9	1	5	4	8	11	8	7	10	12										16
Czech Republic																	11	10	10	11	11	10	10			7
Denmark									1	3						2	2	1			1	1	1			8
Dominica																						2				1
East Germany										9	9	10	6	8	7											6
Ecuador																							1			1
Estonia				1												6	10	10	9	12	14	7	7			9
Ethiopia																				1	1					2
Finland	5	7	5	7	13	17	15	12	11	11	14	12	12	10	13	14	13	11	14	13	17	15	15			23
France	6	8	5	4	7	8	6	4	5	8	6	8	6	2	5	11	10	8	7	11	13	14	12			23
Germany		5		10		9										10	5	10	11	11	14	17	12			11
Great Britain				1			8	3	6	2	5	3	3	11	8	4	1				3	4	4			15
Greece				1						1		2		2	3	4	3	2	2	2	2	2	2	3	3	15
Hungary	7	1			2	2		2	3	3					1	2		1	4	2	2	2	3			15
Iceland						6	2		2			2	3	2	1	2	2					1	3			11
India																				1	1	1	1			4
Iran																			1	1	1	2	1			5
Ireland																			1	1	1	1	1			5
Italy	7	4	6	7	9	11	14	9	9	8	8	7	7	10	14	13	11	13	17	17	18	16	15			23
Japan		5	6	5		2	1	4	4	6	11	3	1	4	4	6	7	11	12	9	6	6	2	8		22
Kazakhstan																	10	10	15	17	11	11	7			7
Kenya																		1	1	1						3
Latvia	1			5												1	2	5	1	4	2	3	3			10
Lebanon							1																1			2
Liechtenstein					5							1		1	3	1	2	2	2	1		1	1			11
Lithuania																2	2	3	4	2	4	2	3	4		9
North Macedonia																		1	1	1	2	2	2			6
Mexico															1	1							1			3
Moldova																			2	2	2	2	1			5
Mongolia									8	2	2		1	4	3	2		1	2	2	2	2	2			13
Nepal																			1	1	1	1				4
North Korea									4							4							3			3
Norway	5	7	6	7	12	15	12	7	8	12										16						
Poland	3	4	4	4	5	1	9	9	9	5										3						
Portugal																				1	1					
Romania				4		9	6		1											3						
South Africa																				1	1					
South Korea								1	1	2										4						
Soviet Union							11	11	13	11																
Spain				4																5						
Sweden	6	6	6	9	11	15	11	12	11	11	11	11	11	13	12	12	13	11	16	15	15	16	14			23
Switzerland	7	6		4	10	9	11	5	7	8	9															
Tonga																							1			1
Turkey				4						4		5		3	4	4	1		2	3	2	2	3	3		13
United States	4	3	7	6	5	7	5	10	7	7																
United Team of Germany							11	14	13																	3
West Germany										10	9	7	8	6	9											6
Yugoslavia	4	6		6	6	2	9		4	3																
Nations	11	15	11	22	15	19	20	19	24	25	19	24	24	32	35	40	35	37	44	53	55	54	65			
Cross-country skiers	59	71	58	108	106	138	150	112	151	147	152	165	131	179	197	223	197	228	260	307	292	310	313			
Year	24	28	32	36	48	52	56	60	64	68	72	76	80	84	88	92	94	98	02	06	10	14	18	22	26	

== See also ==
- Cross-country skiing at the Winter Paralympics
- List of Olympic venues in cross-country skiing
