= Cross-country skiing at the 1980 Winter Olympics =

Cross-country skiing at the XIII Olympic Winter Games
- Pictogram for Cross-country skiing
- Venue: Mount Van Hoevenberg
- Date: February 14–23
- No. of events: 7
- Competitors: 131 (86 men, 45 women) from 24 nations

The 1980 Winter Olympics results in cross-country skiing.

== Medal summary ==
=== Medal table ===
Rank	Nation	Gold	Silver	Bronze	Total
1	Soviet Union	4	2	1	7
2	East Germany	2	0	0	2
3	Sweden	1	0	0	1
4	Finland	0	4	2	6
5	Norway	0	1	2	3
6	Bulgaria	0	0	1	1
6	Czechoslovakia	0	0	1	1
Totals (7 entries)		7	7	7	21

=== Participating NOCs ===
Twenty four nations sent cross-country skiers to compete in the events at Lake Placid.

- Argentina
- Australia
- Bulgaria
- Canada
- China
- Czechoslovakia
- East Germany
- Finland
- France
- Great Britain
- Iceland
- Italy
- Japan
- Mongolia
- Norway
- Poland
- South Korea
- Soviet Union
- Spain
- Sweden
- Switzerland
- United States
- West Germany
- Yugoslavia

=== Men's events ===
Event	Gold		Silver		Bronze	
15 km	Thomas Wassberg; Sweden	41:57.63	Juha Mieto; Finland	41:57.64	Ove Aunli; Norway	42:28.62
30 km	Nikolay Zimyatov; Soviet Union	1:27:02.80	Vasily Rochev; Soviet Union	1:27:34.22	Ivan Lebanov; Bulgaria	1:28:03.87
50 km	Nikolay Zimyatov; Soviet Union	2:27:24.60	Juha Mieto; Finland	2:30:20.52	Alexander Zavyalov; Soviet Union	2:30:51.52
4 × 10 km relay	Soviet Union; Vasily Rochev; Nikolay Bazhukov; Yevgeny Belyayev; Nikolay Zimyatov	1:57:03.46	Norway; Lars Erik Eriksen; Per Knut Aaland; Ove Aunli; Oddvar Brå	1:58:45.77	Finland; Harri Kirvesniemi; Pertti Teurajärvi; Matti Pitkänen; Juha Mieto	2:00:00.18

=== Women's events ===
Event	Gold		Silver		Bronze	
5 km	Raisa Smetanina; Soviet Union	15:06.92	Hilkka Riihivuori; Finland	15:11.96	Květa Jeriová; Czechoslovakia	15:23.44
10 km	Barbara Petzold; East Germany	30:31.54	Hilkka Riihivuori; Finland	30:35.05	Helena Takalo; Finland	30:45.25
4 × 5 km relay	East Germany; Marlies Rostock; Carola Anding; Veronika Hesse; Barbara Petzold	1:02:11.10	Soviet Union; Nina Baldychova; Nina Selyunina; Galina Kulakova; Raisa Smetanina	1:03:18.30	Norway; Brit Pettersen; Anette Bøe; Marit Myrmæl; Berit Aunli	1:04:13.50

== See also ==
- Cross-country skiing at the 1980 Winter Paralympics
