= Cross-country skiing at the 1976 Winter Olympics =

Cross-country skiing at the XII Olympic Winter Games
- Pictogram for Cross-country skiing
- Venue: Seefeld
- Dates: February 5–14
- No. of events: 7
- Competitors: 165 (114 men, 51 women) from 24 nations

The 1976 Winter Olympic Games cross-country skiing results. The women's 3 × 5 km relay was replaced by a 4 × 5 km relay at these games.

== Medal summary ==
=== Medal table ===
Rank	Nation	Gold	Silver	Bronze	Total
1	Soviet Union	4	2	4	10
2	Finland	2	2	1	5
3	Norway	1	1	0	2
4	East Germany	0	1	1	2
5	United States	0	1	0	1
6	Sweden	0	0	1	1
Totals (6 entries)		7	7	7	21

=== Men's events ===
Event	Gold		Silver		Bronze	
15 km	Nikolay Bazhukov; Soviet Union	43:58.47	Yevgeny Belyayev; Soviet Union	44:01.10	Arto Koivisto; Finland	44:19.25
30 km	Sergey Savelyev; Soviet Union	1:30:29.38	Bill Koch; United States	1:30:57.84	Ivan Garanin; Soviet Union	1:31:09.29
50 km	Ivar Formo; Norway	2:37:30.05	Gert-Dietmar Klause; East Germany	2:38:13.21	Benny Södergren; Sweden	2:39:39.21
4 × 10 km relay	Finland; Matti Pitkänen; Juha Mieto; Pertti Teurajärvi; Arto Koivisto	2:07:59.72	Norway; Pål Tyldum; Einar Sagstuen; Ivar Formo; Odd Martinsen	2:09:58.36	Soviet Union; Yevgeny Belyayev; Nikolay Bazhukov; Sergey Savelyev; Ivan Garanin	2:10:51.46

=== Women's events ===
Event	Gold		Silver		Bronze	
5 km	Helena Takalo; Finland	15:48.69	Raisa Smetanina; Soviet Union	15:49.73	Nina Baldycheva; Soviet Union	16:12.82
10 km	Raisa Smetanina; Soviet Union	30:13.41	Helena Takalo; Finland	30:14.28	Galina Kulakova; Soviet Union	30:38.61
4 × 5 km relay	Soviet Union; Nina Baldycheva; Zinaida Amosova; Raisa Smetanina; Galina Kulakova	1:07:49.75	Finland; Liisa Suikhonen; Marjatta Kajosmaa; Hilkka Riihivuori; Helena Takalo	1:08:36.57	East Germany; Monika Debertshäuser; Sigrun Krause; Barbara Petzold; Veronika Hesse	1:09:57.95

=== Participating NOCs ===
Twenty four nations participated in Cross-country skiing at the 1976 Winter Olympic Games.

- Argentina
- Austria
- Bulgaria
- Canada
- Republic of China
- Czechoslovakia
- East Germany
- Finland
- France
- Great Britain
- Greece
- Iceland
- Italy
- Japan
- Liechtenstein
- Norway
- Poland
- Soviet Union
- Sweden
- Switzerland
- Turkey
- United States
- West Germany
- Yugoslavia

== Doping controversy ==
Galina Kulakova of the Soviet Union finished third in the women's 5 km event, but was disqualified due to a positive test for the banned substance ephedrine. She claimed that this was a result of using the nasal spray that contained the substance. Both the FIS and the IOC allowed her to compete in the 10 km and the 4 × 5 km relay. This was the first stripped medal at the Winter Olympics.

== See also ==
- Cross-country skiing at the 1976 Winter Paralympics
