= Canada at the 1976 Winter Olympics =

- IOC code: CAN
- NOC: Canadian Olympic Committee
- Website: www.olympic.ca (in English and French)

in Innsbruck, Austria 4 February 1976 – 15 February 1976
- Competitors: 59 (38 men, 21 women) in 8 sports
- Flag bearer: Dave Irwin (alpine skiing)
- Medals Ranked 11th: Gold 1 Silver 1 Bronze 1 Total 3

Winter Olympics appearances (overview)
- 1924; 1928; 1932; 1936; 1948; 1952; 1956; 1960; 1964; 1968; 1972; 1976; 1980; 1984; 1988; 1992; 1994; 1998; 2002; 2006; 2010; 2014; 2018; 2022; 2026

Canada competed at the 1976 Winter Olympics in Innsbruck, Austria. Canada has competed at every Winter Olympic Games.

== Medalists ==
Medal	Name	Sport	Event
Gold	Kathy Kreiner	Alpine skiing	Women's giant slalom
Silver	Cathy Priestner	Speed skating	Women's 500m
Bronze	Toller Cranston	Figure skating	Men's singles

== Alpine skiing ==
Men

Athlete	Event	Race 1		Race 2		Total	
Athlete	Event	Time	Rank	Time	Rank	Time	Rank
Dave Murray	Downhill					1:48.43	18
Jim Hunter	Downhill					1:47.52	10
Dave Irwin	Downhill					1:47.41	8
Ken Read	Downhill					1:46.83	5
Dave Murray	Giant Slalom	1:54.43	42	DNF	–	DNF	–
Ken Read	Giant Slalom	1:52.81	39	DNF	–	DNF	–
Robert Safrata	Giant Slalom	1:51.70	36	DNF	–	DNF	–
Jim Hunter	Giant Slalom	1:48.56	21	1:48.80	25	3:37.36	22
Dave Murray	Slalom	DNF	–	–	–	DNF	–
Ken Read	Slalom	DNF	–	–	–	DNF	–
Robert Safrata	Slalom	1:07.63	33	1:10.35	25	2:17.98	27
Jim Hunter	Slalom	1:06.26	28	1:10.80	27	2:17.06	23

Women

Athlete	Event	Race 1		Race 2		Total	
Athlete	Event	Time	Rank	Time	Rank	Time	Rank
Betsy Clifford	Downhill					1:51.40	22
Kathy Kreiner	Downhill					1:50.48	19
Laurie Kreiner	Downhill					1:49.97	16
Laurie Kreiner	Giant Slalom					1:34.53	27
Betsy Clifford	Giant Slalom					1:32.61	22
Kathy Kreiner	Giant Slalom					1:29.13	1st place, gold medalist(s)
Kathy Kreiner	Slalom	DNF	–	–	–	DNF	–
Laurie Kreiner	Slalom	50.26	20	49.12	15	1:39.38	14
Betsy Clifford	Slalom	49.09	13	DNF	–	DNF	–

== Bobsleigh ==
Sled	Athletes	Event	Run 1		Run 2		Run 3		Run 4		Total	
Sled	Athletes	Event	Time	Rank	Time	Rank	Time	Rank	Time	Rank	Time	Rank
CAN-1	Colin Nelson; Jim Lavalley	Two-man	57.56	13	57.92	18	58.13	21	58.39	22	3:52.00	18
CAN-2	Joey Kilburn; Brian Vachon	Two-man	58.61	23	58.74	23	58.22	22	58.72	23	3:54.29	23

Sled	Athletes	Event	Run 1		Run 2		Run 3		Run 4		Total	
Sled	Athletes	Event	Time	Rank	Time	Rank	Time	Rank	Time	Rank	Time	Rank
CAN-1	Colin Nelson; Thomas Stehr; David Veale; Jim Lavalley	Four-man	55.97	13	56.67	17	57.49	17	57.89	17	3:48.02	17
CAN-2	Christopher Frank; William Dunn; Christopher Martin; Brian Vachon	Four-man	57.43	21	56.87	19	57.87	20	58.69	21	3:50.86	21

== Cross-country skiing ==
Men

Event	Athlete	Race	
Event	Athlete	Time	Rank
15 km	Ernie Lennie	52:27.04	67
15 km	Edward Day	49:59.43	59
15 km	Hans Skinstad	49:30.36	56
15 km	Bert Bullock	47:23.38	33
30 km	Reijo Puiras	1'41:34.43	56
30 km	Edward Day	1'38:09.10	42
30 km	Bert Bullock	1'36:24.55	31
30 km	Hans Skinstad	1'36:16.95	30
50 km	Bert Bullock	DNF	–
50 km	Ernie Lennie	3'01:01.57	41
50 km	Edward Day	2'51:58.75	37
50 km	Hans Skinstad	2'46:11.83	22

Men's 4 × 10 km relay

Athletes	Race	
Athletes	Time	Rank
Bert Bullock; Ernie Lennie; Edward Day; Hans Skinstad	2'15:31.85	12

Women

Event	Athlete	Race	
Event	Athlete	Time	Rank
5 km	Esther Miller	18:05.05	34
5 km	Joan Groothuysen	17:51.08	30
5 km	Sharon Firth	17:35.06	29
5 km	Shirley Firth	17:31.36	27
10 km	Joan Groothuysen	34:16.35	34
10 km	Sue Holloway	34:03.49	32
10 km	Shirley Firth	33:16.50	29
10 km	Sharon Firth	33:15.20	28

Women's 4 × 5 km relay

Athletes	Race	
Athletes	Time	Rank
Shirley Firth; Joan Groothuysen; Sue Holloway; Sharon Firth	1'14:02.72	7

== Figure skating ==
Men

Athlete	CF	SP	FS	Points	Places	Rank
Ron Shaver	6	3	–	–	DNF	–
Stan Bohonek	17	15	13	165.88	124	14
Toller Cranston	7	1	2	187.38	30	3rd place, bronze medalist(s)

Women

Athlete	CF	SP	FS	Points	Places	Rank
Kim Alletson	13	14	13	171.64	122.5	14
Lynn Nightingale	10	5	8	181.72	67	9

Pairs

Athletes	SP	FS	Points	Places	Rank
Candace Jones; Donald Fraser	13	14	116.54	117	14

Ice Dancing

Athletes	CD	FD	Points	Places	Rank
Susan Carscallen; Eric Gillies	14	12	175.96	107	13
Barbara Berezowski; David Porter	10	9	182.90	86	10

== Luge ==
Men

Athlete	Run 1		Run 2		Run 3		Run 4		Total	
Athlete	Time	Rank	Time	Rank	Time	Rank	Time	Rank	Time	Rank
Denis Michaud	DSQ	–	–	–	–	–	–	–	DSQ	–
Michael Shragge	57.950	38	55.812	34	56.656	36	55.874	35	3:46.292	35
Larry Arbuthnot	56.691	34	55.380	27	55.085	29	55.628	31	3:42.784	31

(Men's) Doubles

Athletes	Run 1		Run 2		Total	
Athletes	Time	Rank	Time	Rank	Time	Rank
Larry Arbuthnot; Doug Hansen	44.933	16	45.102	17	1:30.035	17
David McComb; Michael Shragge	45.421	19	46.169	23	1:31.590	22

Women

Athlete	Run 1		Run 2		Run 3		Run 4		Total	
Athlete	Time	Rank	Time	Rank	Time	Rank	Time	Rank	Time	Rank
Julie Chase	46.529	25	46.570	26	51.633	26	48.790	26	3:13.522	26
Mary Jane Bowie	45.804	22	45.719	22	45.352	23	45.466	23	3:02.341	23
Carole Keyes	45.654	21	45.692	21	45.200	22	45.337	21	3:01.883	22

== Nordic combined ==
Events:

- normal hill ski jumping (Three jumps, best two counted and shown here.)
- 15 km cross-country skiing

Athlete	Event	Ski Jumping				Cross-country			Total	
Athlete	Event	Distance 1	Distance 2	Points	Rank	Time	Points	Rank	Points	Rank
Kurt Sjolund	Individual	58.0	57.0	124.0	34	58:13.40	128.22	33	252.22	33

== Ski jumping ==
Athlete	Event	Jump 1		Jump 2		Total	
Athlete	Event	Distance	Points	Distance	Points	Points	Rank
Donald Grady	Normal hill	66.5	85.7	64.0	79.2	164.9	55
Kim Fripp	Normal hill	69.0	91.2	66.5	84.7	175.9	54
Richard Grady	Normal hill	72.5	96.3	72.5	96.3	192.6	48
Peter Wilson	Normal hill	75.0	103.8	74.5	103.5	207.3	36
Kim Fripp	Large hill	74.0	68.6	67.0	57.3	125.9	53
Donald Grady	Large hill	79.0	78.1	76.0	71.4	149.5	48
Peter Wilson	Large hill	78.5	79.4	74.5	75.3	154.7	45
Richard Grady	Large hill	81.0	80.4	76.0	72.9	153.3	46

== Speed skating ==
Men

Event	Athlete	Race	
Event	Athlete	Time	Rank
500 m	Gaétan Boucher	40.53	14
500 m	Tom Overend	40.22	11
1000 m	Tom Overend	1:25.06	23
1000 m	Gaétan Boucher	1:21.23	6
1500 m	Gaétan Boucher	2:04.63	14
5000 m	Andy Barron	8:10.00	23

Women

Event	Athlete	Race	
Event	Athlete	Time	Rank
500 m	Kathy Vogt	45.62	21
500 m	Sylvia Burka	44.35	11
500 m	Cathy Priestner	43.12	2nd place, silver medalist(s)
1000 m	Liz Appleby	1:34.27	22
1000 m	Cathy Priestner	1:29.66	6
1000 m	Sylvia Burka	1:29.47	4
1500 m	Kathy Vogt	2:25.49	23
1500 m	Liz Appleby	2:24.89	21
1500 m	Sylvia Burka	2:19.74	9
3000 m	Gayle Gordon	5:07.09	23
3000 m	Liz Appleby	4:58.68	18
3000 m	Sylvia Burka	4:49.04	8
