= Bobsleigh at the 1976 Winter Olympics – Four-man =

Four-man at the XII Olympic Winter Games
- Venue: Olympic Sliding Centre Innsbruck
- Dates: 13–14 February 1976
- Competitors: 85 from 12 nations
- Winning time: 3:40.43

Medalists
| 1st place, gold medalist(s) | | East Germany; Meinhard Nehmer, Jochen Babock, Bernhard Germeshausen, Bernhard Lehmann |
| 2nd place, silver medalist(s) | | Switzerland; Erich Schärer, Ueli Bächli, Ruedi Marti, Sepp Benz |
| 3rd place, bronze medalist(s) | | West Germany; Wolfgang Zimmerer, Peter Utzschneider, Bodo Bittner, Manfred Schumann |

The Four-man bobsleigh competition at the 1976 Winter Olympics in Innsbruck was held on 15 and 16 February, at Olympic Sliding Centre Innsbruck.

== Results ==
| Rank | Country | Athletes | Run 1 | Run 2 | Run 3 | Run 4 | Total |
|---|---|---|---|---|---|---|---|
| 1st place, gold medalist(s) | East Germany (GDR-1) | Meinhard Nehmer; Jochen Babock; Bernhard Germeshausen; Bernhard Lehmann | 54.43 | 54.64 | 55.51 | 55.85 | 3:40.43 |
| 2nd place, silver medalist(s) | Switzerland (SUI-2) | Erich Schärer; Ueli Bächli; Ruedi Marti; Sepp Benz | 54.96 | 54.81 | 55.28 | 55.84 | 3:40.89 |
| 3rd place, bronze medalist(s) | West Germany (FRG-1) | Wolfgang Zimmerer; Peter Utzschneider; Bodo Bittner; Manfred Schumann | 54.82 | 54.87 | 55.53 | 56.15 | 3:41.37 |
| 4 | East Germany (GDR-2) | Horst Schönau; Horst Bernhardt; Harald Seifert; Raimund Bethge | 55.11 | 55.12 | 55.63 | 56.58 | 3:42.44 |
| 5 | West Germany (FRG-2) | Georg Heibl; Hans Morant; Siegfried Radandt; Fritz Ohlwärter | 54.92 | 54.98 | 55.70 | 56.87 | 3:42.47 |
| 6 | Austria (AUT-2) | Werner Delle Karth; Andreas Schwab; Heinz Krenn; Otto Breg; Franz Köfel | 54.66 | 55.80 | 56.10 | 56.65 | 3:43.21 |
| 7 | Austria (AUT-1) | Fritz Sperling; Kurt Oberhöller; Gerd Zaunschirm; Dieter Gehmacher | 55.51 | 55.62 | 56.05 | 56.61 | 3:43.79 |
| 8 | Romania (ROU-1) | Dragoș Panaitescu-Rapan; Paul Neagu; Costel Ionescu; Gheorghe Lixandru | 55.54 | 55.51 | 56.18 | 56.68 | 3:43.91 |
| 9 | Switzerland (SUI-1) | Fritz Lüdi; Thomas Hagen; Rudolf Schmid; Karl Häseli | 55.29 | 55.33 | 56.37 | 57.05 | 3:44.04 |
| 10 | France | Gérard Christaud-Pipola; Alain Roy; André Belle; Serge Hissung | 55.75 | 55.66 | 56.43 | 57.06 | 3:44.90 |
| 11 | Italy (ITA-2) | Nevio De Zordo; Ezio Fiori; Roberto Porzia; Lino Benoni | 55.75 | 55.80 | 57.08 | 57.17 | 3:45.80 |
| 12 | Italy (ITA-1) | Giorgio Alverà; Piero Vegnuti; Adriano Bee; Francesco Butteri | 55.59 | 55.92 | 56.94 | 57.42 | 3:45.87 |
| 13 | Great Britain (GBR-1) | Jackie Price; Colin Campbell; Michael Sweet; Gomer Lloyd | 56.02 | 56.07 | 56.72 | 57.58 | 3:46.39 |
| 14 | Romania (ROU-2) | Ion Panţuru; Constantin Romaniuc; Alexe Gheorghe Tănăsescu; Mihai Nicolau | 56.09 | 56.23 | 56.81 | 57.57 | 3:46.70 |
| 15 | United States (USA-1) | Jimmy Morgan; Peter Brennan; John Proctor; Thomas Becker | 56.09 | 56.08 | 56.96 | 57.59 | 3:46.72 |
| 16 | Sweden | Carl-Erik Eriksson; Jan Johansson; Leif Johansson; Kenth Rönn | 56.12 | 56.48 | 56.87 | 57.65 | 3:47.12 |
| 17 | Canada (CAN-1) | Colin Nelson; Thomas Stehr; David Veale; Jim Lavalley | 55.97 | 56.67 | 57.49 | 57.89 | 3:48.02 |
| 18 | Japan | Susumu Esashika; Kazumi Abe; Rikio Sato; Kimihiro Shinada | 56.47 | 56.97 | 57.78 | 58.19 | 3:49.41 |
| 19 | United States (USA-2) | William Hollrock; Earl Frisbie; Frederick Fritsch; Phil Duprey | 56.61 | 56.86 | 57.89 | 58.35 | 3:49.71 |
| 20 | Great Britain (GBR-2) | Mark Agar; Anthony Norton; Graham Sweet; Andrew Ogilvy-Wedderburn | 57.21 | 56.88 | 57.75 | 58.01 | 3:49.85 |
| 21 | Canada (CAN-2) | Christopher Frank; William Dunn; Christopher Martin; Brian Vachon | 57.43 | 56.87 | 57.87 | 58.69 | 3:50.86 |
