= Canada at the 1972 Winter Olympics =

- IOC code: CAN
- NOC: Canadian Olympic Committee
- Website: www.olympic.ca (in English and French)

in Sapporo, Japan 3 February 1972 – 13 February 1972
- Competitors: 47 (29 men, 18 women) in 7 sports
- Flag bearer: Karen Magnussen (figure skating)
- Medals Ranked 17th: Gold 0 Silver 1 Bronze 0 Total 1

Winter Olympics appearances (overview)
- 1924; 1928; 1932; 1936; 1948; 1952; 1956; 1960; 1964; 1968; 1972; 1976; 1980; 1984; 1988; 1992; 1994; 1998; 2002; 2006; 2010; 2014; 2018; 2022; 2026

Canada competed at the 1972 Winter Olympics in Sapporo, Japan. Canada has competed at every Winter Olympic Games.

The one silver medal won by Karen Magnussen ties with the Canadian Olympic Team of 1936 for the lowest medal total by a Canadian Winter Olympic Team.

== Medalists ==
Medal	Name	Sport	Event
Silver	Karen Magnussen	Figure skating	Women's singles

== Alpine skiing ==
Men

Athlete	Event	Race 1		Race 2		Total	
Athlete	Event	Time	Rank	Time	Rank	Time	Rank
Derek Robbins	Downhill					2:00.38	38
Reto Barrington	Downhill					1:58.29	32
Jim Hunter	Downhill					1:55.16	20
Derek Robbins	Giant Slalom	DSQ	–	–	–	DSQ	–
Reto Barrington	Giant Slalom	1:35.22	18	1:42.02	24	3:17.24	20
Jim Hunter	Giant Slalom	1:33.83	13	1:39.15	10	3:12.98	11

Men's slalom

Athlete	Classification		Final					
Athlete	Time	Rank	Time 1	Rank	Time 2	Rank	Total	Rank
Jim Hunter	1:47.16	4	1:02.02	31	59.50	20	2:01.52	19
Reto Barrington	DSQ	–	1:04.02	34	59.23	19	2:03.25	23
Derek Robbins	DNF	–	DNF	–	–	–	DNF	–

Women

Athlete	Event	Race 1		Race 2		Total	
Athlete	Event	Time	Rank	Time	Rank	Time	Rank
Kathy Kreiner	Downhill					1:43.68	33
Judy Crawford	Downhill					1:41.75	27
Laurie Kreiner	Downhill					1:41.00	20
Carolyne Oughton	Downhill					1:40.92	18
Carolyne Oughton	Giant Slalom					1:38.29	29
Judy Crawford	Giant Slalom					1:35.60	24
Diane Pratte	Giant Slalom					1:33.59	15
Laurie Kreiner	Giant Slalom					1:32.48	4
Kathy Kreiner	Slalom	50.55	19	49.72	15	1:40.27	14
Diane Pratte	Slalom	49.32	17	DNF	–	DNF	–
Laurie Kreiner	Slalom	48.81	15	48.49	12	1:37.30	12
Judy Crawford	Slalom	47.12	5	46.83	6	1:33.95	4

== Bobsleigh ==
Sled	Athletes	Event	Run 1		Run 2		Run 3		Run 4		Total	
Sled	Athletes	Event	Time	Rank	Time	Rank	Time	Rank	Time	Rank	Time	Rank
CAN-1	Hans Gehrig; Andrew Faulds	Two-man	1:18.82	20	1:18.36	20	1:15.66	17	1:16.06	17	5:08.90	18
CAN-2	Bob Storey; Michael Hartley	Two-man	1:18.49	18	1:16.70	8	1:14.90	13	1:15.61	15	5:05.70	14

Sled	Athletes	Event	Run 1		Run 2		Run 3		Run 4		Total	
Sled	Athletes	Event	Time	Rank	Time	Rank	Time	Rank	Time	Rank	Time	Rank
CAN-1	Hans Gehrig; David Richardson; Peter Blakeley; Andrew Faulds	Four-man	1:12.61	15	1:12.43	9	1:10.76	5	1:12.26	16	4:48.06	13

== Cross-country skiing ==
Men

Event	Athlete	Race	
Event	Athlete	Time	Rank
15 km	Jarl Omholt-Jensen	50:52.14	52
15 km	Roger Allen	50:41.31	50
15 km	Fred Kelly	50:07.22	49
15 km	Malcolm Hunter	49:54.08	45
30 km	Jarl Omholt-Jensen	1'51:14.04	50
30 km	Malcolm Hunter	1'46:51.47	43

Men's 4 × 10 km relay

Athletes	Race	
Athletes	Time	Rank
Fred Kelly; Roger Allen; Jarl Omholt-Jensen; Malcolm Hunter	2'16:56.41	13

Women

Event	Athlete	Race	
Event	Athlete	Time	Rank
5 km	Hellen Sander	19:30.01	41
5 km	Roseanne Allen	19:22.70	40
5 km	Shirley Firth	18:36.07	35
5 km	Sharon Firth	18:06.28	26
10 km	Hellen Sander	40:25.11	40
10 km	Sharon Firth	36:52.49	24

Women's 3 × 5 km relay

Athletes	Race	
Athletes	Time	Rank
Shirley Firth; Sharon Firth; Roseanne Allen	53:37.82	10

== Figure skating ==
Men

Athlete	CF	FS	Points	Places	Rank
Toller Cranston	12	5	2517.2	80.5	9

Women

Athlete	CF	FS	Points	Places	Rank
Catherine Irwin	12	12	2383.4	116	13
Karen Magnussen	3	2	2673.2	23	2nd place, silver medalist(s)

Pairs

Athletes	SP	FS	Points	Places	Rank
Mary Petrie; John Hubbell	15	15	358.5	129	15
Sandra Bezic; Val Bezic	9	9	384.9	84	9

== Luge ==
Men

Athlete	Run 1		Run 2		Run 3		Run 4		Total	
Athlete	Time	Rank	Time	Rank	Time	Rank	Time	Rank	Time	Rank
Paul Nielsen	DNF	–	–	–	–	–	–	–	DNF	–
Doug Hansen	55.73	36	55.94	39	55.20	40	55.35	40	3:42.22	38
David McComb	55.20	31	56.14	41	54.52	33	54.57	35	3:40.43	35
Larry Arbuthnot	54.11	18	54.17	21	54.17	31	54.12	33	3:36.57	25

(Men's) Doubles

Athletes	Run 1		Run 2		Total	
Athletes	Time	Rank	Time	Rank	Time	Rank
Larry Arbuthnot; Doug Hansen	46.47	15	46.22	15	1:32.69	16

== Ski jumping ==
Athlete	Event	Jump 1		Jump 2		Total	
Athlete	Event	Distance	Points	Distance	Points	Points	Rank
Peter Wilson	Normal hill	64.5	79.4	60.5	70.0	149.4	56
Rick Gulyas	Normal hill	71.0	90.8	70.5	90.5	181.3	48
Ulf Kvendbo	Normal hill	70.5	93.0	71.0	94.8	187.8	44
Zdenek Mezl	Normal hill	74.0	100.6	70.0	92.2	192.8	40
Ulf Kvendbo	Large hill	79.0	75.6	80.0	77.0	152.6	45
Peter Wilson	Large hill	83.0	78.7	83.5	80.9	159.6	39
Zdenek Mezl	Large hill	98.0	104.7	89.0	89.6	194.3	17

== Speed skating ==
Men

Event	Athlete	Race	
Event	Athlete	Time	Rank
500 m	John Cassidy	43.01	30
500 m	Gerry Cassan	42.87	29
1500 m	Andy Barron	2:17.71	36
1500 m	Kevin Sirois	2:13.99	26
1500 m	Bob Hodges	2:12.13	23
5000 m	Andy Barron	8:11.84	25
5000 m	Kevin Sirois	8:02.66	19
10,000 m	Kevin Sirois	15:58.61	14

Women

Event	Athlete	Race	
Event	Athlete	Time	Rank
500 m	Sylvia Burka	DSQ	–
500 m	Donna McCannell	47.30	25
500 m	Cathy Priestner	45.79	14
1000 m	Gayle Gordon	1:38.32	32
1000 m	Cathy Priestner	1:37.11	29
1000 m	Sylvia Burka	1:32.95	8
1500 m	Jennifer Jackson	2:35.22	30
1500 m	Gayle Gordon	2:31.86	27
1500 m	Sylvia Burka	2:29.60	21
