= Cross-country skiing at the 1976 Winter Olympics – Men's 15 kilometre =

Men's 15 kilometre at the XII Olympic Winter Games
- Venue: Seefeld
- Dates: 8 February 1976
- Competitors: 80 from 23 nations
- Winning time: 43:58.47

Medalists
1st place, gold medalist(s)		Nikolay Bazhukov; Soviet Union
2nd place, silver medalist(s)		Yevgeny Belyayev; Soviet Union
3rd place, bronze medalist(s)		Arto Koivisto; Finland

The men's 15 kilometre cross-country skiing competition at the 1976 Winter Olympics in Innsbruck, Austria, was held on Sunday 8 February at Seefeld in Tirol. Each skier started at half a minute intervals, skiing the entire 15 kilometre course.

== Results ==
Rank	Bib	Name	Country	Time	Deficit
1st place, gold medalist(s)	55	Nikolay Bazhukov	Soviet Union	43:58.47	–
2nd place, silver medalist(s)	7	Yevgeny Belyayev	Soviet Union	44:01.10	+2.63
3rd place, bronze medalist(s)	52	Arto Koivisto	Finland	44:19.25	+20.78
4	78	Ivan Garanin	Soviet Union	44:41.98	+43.51
5	31	Ivar Formo	Norway	45:29.11	+1:30.64
6	4	Bill Koch	United States	45:33.22	+1:34.75
7	61	Georg Zipfel	West Germany	45:38.10	+1:39.63
8	13	Odd Martinsen	Norway	45:41.33	+1:42.86
9	34	Gert-Dietmar Klause	East Germany	45:42.97	+1:44.50
10	37	Juha Mieto	Finland	45:46.27	+1:47.80
11	8	Albert Giger	Switzerland	45:47.07	+1:48.60
12	43	Franz Renggli	Switzerland	45:53.49	+1:55.02
13	12	Benny Södergren	Sweden	45:59.91	+2:01.44
14	65	Pertti Teurajärvi	Finland	46:04.84	+2:06.37
15	76	Thomas Wassberg	Sweden	46:13.35	+2:14.88
16	35	Yury Skobov	Soviet Union	46:16.27	+2:17.80
17	54	Edi Hauser	Switzerland	46:29.14	+2:30.67
18	33	Jean-Paul Pierrat	France	46:35.64	+2:37.17
19	23	Herbert Wachter	Austria	46:46.39	+2:47.92
20	74	Pål Tyldum	Norway	46:50.57	+2:52.10
21	18	Giulio Capitanio	Italy	46:51.14	+2:52.67
22	16	Wiesław Gębala	Poland	46:59.00	+3:00.53
23	59	Tommy Limby	Sweden	47:00.06	+3:01.59
24	50	Ivan Lebanov	Bulgaria	47:02.41	+3:03.94
25	73	Jürgen Wolf	East Germany	47:04.49	+3:06.02
26	29	Lyubomir Toskov	Bulgaria	47:04.87	+3:06.40
27	68	Fredel Kälin	Switzerland	47:05.39	+3:06.92
28	10	Gerd Heßler	East Germany	47:08.77	+3:10.30
29	57	Renzo Chiocchetti	Italy	47:11.22	+3:12.75
30	40	Sven-Åke Lundbäck	Sweden	47:12.85	+3:14.38
31	1	Georg Kandlinger	West Germany	47:20.13	+3:21.66
32	20	Risto Kiiskinen	Finland	47:21.06	+3:22.59
33	39	Bert Bullock	Canada	47:23.38	+3:24.91
34	48	František Šimon	Czechoslovakia	47:24.90	+3:26.43
35	69	Ján Fajstavr	Czechoslovakia	47:25.77	+3:27.30
36	25	Roberto Primus	Italy	47:29.02	+3:30.55
37	27	Tim Caldwell	United States	47:33.59	+3:35.12
38	44	Frank Betz	West Germany	47:39.15	+3:40.68
39	41	Milan Jarý	Czechoslovakia	47:50.01	+3:51.54
40	53	Jan Staszel	Poland	48:04.31	+4:05.84
41	19	Petar Pankov	Bulgaria	48:04.46	+4:05.99
42	15	Rudolf Horn	Austria	48:10.52	+4:12.05
43	47	Werner Vogel	Austria	48:17.47	+4:19.00
44	26	Władysław Podgórski	Poland	48:18.62	+4:20.15
45	79	Hans Speicher	West Germany	48:28.90	+4:30.43
46	22	Stanislav Henych	Czechoslovakia	48:31.23	+4:32.76
47	32	Halldór Matthíasson	Iceland	48:42.22	+4:43.75
48	70	Josef Vogel	Austria	48:42.32	+4:43.85
49	63	Gerhard Grimmer	East Germany	48:45.04	+4:46.57
50	42	Kiyoshi Hayasaka	Japan	48:46.93	+4:48.46
51	5	Daniel Drezet	France	48:56.97	+4:58.50
52	77	Ronny Yeager	United States	48:58.16	+4:59.69
53	67	Fabrizio Pedranzini	Italy	48:58.30	+4:59.83
54	64	Doug Peterson	United States	49:00.98	+5:02.51
55	56	Magne Myrmo	Norway	49:26.89	+5:28.42
56	2	Hans Skinstad	Canada	49:30.36	+5:31.89
57	24	Maksi Jelenc	Yugoslavia	49:35.35	+5:36.88
58	17	Ryoji Fujiki	Japan	49:40.48	+5:42.01
59	46	Edward Day	Canada	49:59.43	+6:00.96
60	75	Khristo Barzanov	Bulgaria	50:08.09	+6:09.62
61	62	Roland Jeannerod	France	50:18.27	+6:19.80
62	80	Gérard Verguet	France	50:29.28	+6:30.81
63	60	Paul Gibbins	Great Britain	51:48.02	+7:49.55
64	51	Bahri Yılmaz	Turkey	51:57.08	+7:58.61
65	11	Douglas Elliott	Great Britain	52:14.27	+8:15.80
66	36	Sacit Özbey	Turkey	52:15.41	+8:16.94
67	71	Ernie Lennie	Canada	52:27.04	+8:28.57
68	28	Keith Oliver	Great Britain	52:31.00	+8:32.53
69	3	Trausti Sveinsson	Iceland	52:50.29	+8:51.82
70	72	Şeref Çınar	Turkey	52:50.67	+8:52.20
71	38	Marcos Luis Jerman	Argentina	53:43.30	+9:44.83
72	6	Yavuz Özbey	Turkey	55:47.50	+11:49.03
73	45	Ueng Ming-Yih	Republic of China	57:02.70	+13:04.23
74	9	Martín Tomás Jerman	Argentina	1:00:07.30	+16:08.83
75	21	Efstathios Vogdanos	Greece	1:05:51.20	+21:52.73
76	14	Liang Reng-Guey	Republic of China	1:06:02.70	+22:04.23
77	49	Shen Li-Chien	Republic of China	1:06:45.70	+22:47.23
78	30	Athanasios Koutsogiannis	Greece	1:07:49.40	+23:50.93
	58	Matías José Jerman	Argentina	DNF	
	66	Jan Dragon	Poland	DNF	
