= Cross-country skiing at the 1976 Winter Olympics – Men's 50 kilometre =

Men's 50 kilometre at the XII Olympic Winter Games
- Venue: Seefeld
- Dates: 14 February 1976
- Competitors: 59 from 17 nations
- Winning time: 2:37:30.05

Medalists
1st place, gold medalist(s)		Ivar Formo; Norway
2nd place, silver medalist(s)		Gert-Dietmar Klause; East Germany
3rd place, bronze medalist(s)		Benny Södergren; Sweden

The men's 50 kilometre cross-country skiing competition at the 1976 Winter Olympics in Innsbruck, Austria, was held on Saturday 14 February at Seefeld. Gerhard Grimmer of East Germany was the 1974 World champion and Pål Tyldum of Norway was the defending champion from the 1972 Olympics in Sapporo, Japan.

Each skier started at half a minute intervals, skiing the entire 50 kilometre course. Of the 59 athletes who started the race, 15 did not finish. Ivar Formo of Norway took his first and only Olympic gold medal.

== Results ==
Rank	Bib	Name	Country	Time	Deficit
1st place, gold medalist(s)	42	Ivar Formo	Norway	2:37:30.05	–
2nd place, silver medalist(s)	37	Gert-Dietmar Klause	East Germany	2:38:13.21	+43.16
3rd place, bronze medalist(s)	34	Benny Södergren	Sweden	2:39:39.21	+2:09.16
4	50	Ivan Garanin	Soviet Union	2:40:38.94	+3:08.89
5	24	Gerhard Grimmer	East Germany	2:41:15.46	+3:45.41
6	46	Per Knut Aaland	Norway	2:41:18.06	+3:48.01
7	16	Pål Tyldum	Norway	2:42:21.86	+4:51.81
8	6	Tommy Limby	Sweden	2:42:43.58	+5:13.53
9	44	Juhani Repo	Finland	2:42:54.89	+5:24.84
10	21	Arto Koivisto	Finland	2:43:44.79	+6:14.74
11	26	Jean-Paul Pierrat	France	2:44:03.31	+6:33.26
12	22	Vasily Rochev	Soviet Union	2:44:31.23	+7:01.18
13	23	Bill Koch	United States	2:44:34.69	+7:04.64
14	15	Milan Jarý	Czechoslovakia	2:44:51.16	+7:21.11
15	41	Jiří Beran	Czechoslovakia	2:44:51.80	+7:21.75
16	49	Sven-Åke Lundbäck	Sweden	2:45:04.82	+7:34.77
17	55	Ján Fajstavr	Czechoslovakia	2:45:19.91	+7:49.86
18	18	Franz Renggli	Switzerland	2:45:25.24	+7:55.19
19	25	Matti Kuosko	Sweden	2:45:33.41	+8:03.36
20	5	Heinz Gähler	Switzerland	2:45:51.64	+8:21.59
21	45	Sergey Savelyev	Soviet Union	2:46:01.36	+8:31.31
22	20	Hans Skinstad	Canada	2:46:11.83	+8:41.78
23	33	Georg Zipfel	West Germany	2:46:20.30	+8:50.25
24	17	Herbert Wachter	Austria	2:46:40.25	+9:10.20
25	4	Walter Demel	West Germany	2:46:55.95	+9:25.90
26	38	Werner Vogel	Austria	2:47:05.63	+9:35.58
27	51	Pertti Teurajärvi	Finland	2:47:25.60	+9:55.55
28	57	Gerd Heßler	East Germany	2:47:34.90	+10:04.85
29	3	Jean-Paul Vandel	France	2:47:45.20	+10:15.15
30	27	Stanislav Henych	Czechoslovakia	2:48:00.27	+10:30.22
31	32	Venanz Egger	Switzerland	2:48:30.70	+11:00.65
32	58	Christian Pfeuti	Switzerland	2:49:50.90	+12:20.85
33	7	Dieter Meinel	East Germany	2:49:52.42	+12:22.37
34	8	Juha Mieto	Finland	2:50:03.61	+12:33.56
35	12	Reinhold Feichter	Austria	2:50:53.00	+13:22.95
36	54	Stan Dunklee	United States	2:51:26.28	+13:56.23
37	39	Edward Day	Canada	2:51:58.75	+14:28.70
38	10	Yevgeny Belyayev	Soviet Union	2:54:00.55	+16:30.50
39	29	Lyubomir Toskov	Bulgaria	2:55:11.11	+17:41.06
40	1	Petar Pankov	Bulgaria	2:57:07.93	+19:37.88
41	52	Ernie Lennie	Canada	3:01:01.57	+23:31.52
42	2	Halldór Matthíasson	Iceland	3:02:51.17	+25:21.12
43	48	Heinrich Wallner	Austria	3:03:58.19	+26:28.14
44	13	Maksi Jelenc	Yugoslavia	3:05:05.94	+27:35.89
	9	Tonio Biondini	Italy	DNF	
	11	Tim Caldwell	United States	DNF	
	14	Bert Bullock	Canada	DNF	
	19	Jerzy Koryciak	Poland	DNF	
	28	Georg Kandlinger	West Germany	DNF	
	30	Ulrico Costner	Italy	DNF	
	31	Oddvar Brå	Norway	DNF	
	35	Jan Staszel	Poland	DNF	
	36	Roland Jeannerod	France	DNF	
	40	Chris Haines	United States	DNF	
	43	Roberto Primus	Italy	DNF	
	47	Pierre Salvi	France	DNF	
	53	Wiesław Gębal	Poland	DNF	
	56	Frank Betz	West Germany	DNF	
	59	Carlo Favre	Italy	DNF	
