= France at the 1976 Winter Olympics =

- IOC code: FRA
- NOC: French National Olympic and Sports Committee

in Innsbruck
- Competitors: 35 (29 men, 6 women) in 8 sports
- Flag bearers: Danièle Debernard, Alpine Skiing
- Medals Ranked 16th: Gold 0 Silver 0 Bronze 1 Total 1

Winter Olympics appearances (overview)
- 1924; 1928; 1932; 1936; 1948; 1952; 1956; 1960; 1964; 1968; 1972; 1976; 1980; 1984; 1988; 1992; 1994; 1998; 2002; 2006; 2010; 2014; 2018; 2022; 2026

France had athletes compete in the 1976 Winter Olympics in Innsbruck, Austria.

== Medalists ==
Medal	Name	Sport	Event
Bronze	Danièle Debernard	Alpine skiing	Women's giant slalom

== Alpine skiing ==
Men

Athlete	Event	Race 1		Race 2		Total	
Athlete	Event	Time	Rank	Time	Rank	Time	Rank
Patrice Pellat-Finet	Downhill					1:48.34	16
Philippe Hardy	Giant Slalom	1:51.20	34	1:49.23	26	3:40.43	27
Philippe Barroso	Giant Slalom	1:50.23	31	1:48.26	22	3:38.49	25
Claude Perrot	Giant Slalom	1:49.48	28	1:53.36	31	3:42.84	29
Alain Navillod	Giant Slalom	1:47.15	11	1:47.18	17	3:34.33	15
Claude Perrot	Slalom	DNF	–	–	–	DNF	–
Philippe Hardy	Slalom	DNF	–	–	–	DNF	–
Roland Roche	Slalom	1:03.53	19	1:06.78	15	2:10.31	15
Gérard Bonnevie	Slalom	1:03.51	18	DNF	–	DNF	–

Women

Athlete	Event	Race 1		Race 2		Total	
Athlete	Event	Time	Rank	Time	Rank	Time	Rank
Fabienne Serrat	Downhill					1:51.34	21
Michèle Jacot	Downhill					1:49.98	17
Jacqueline Rouvier	Downhill					1:48.58	6
Danièle Debernard	Downhill					1:48.48	5
Michèle Jacot	Giant Slalom					1:31.44	13
Patricia Emonet	Giant Slalom					1:31.21	11
Jacqueline Rouvier	Giant Slalom					1:30.79	10
Danièle Debernard	Giant Slalom					1:29.95	3rd place, bronze medalist(s)
Fabienne Serrat	Slalom	DNF	–	–	–	DNF	–
Michèle Jacot	Slalom	50.00	18	DNF	–	DNF	–
Patricia Emonet	Slalom	47.47	5	DNF	–	DNF	–
Danièle Debernard	Slalom	46.86	3	45.38	5	1:32.24	4

== Biathlon ==
Men

Event	Athlete	Time	Penalties	Adjusted time ^{1}	Rank
20 km	Aimé Gruet-Masson	1'18:35.81	9	1'27:35.81	42
20 km	Jean-Claude Viry	1'18:09.51	7	1'25:09.51	33
20 km	René Arpin	1'13:50.92	9	1'22:50.92	22

^{1} One minute added per close miss (a hit in the outer ring), two minutes added per complete miss.

Men's 4 x 7.5 km relay

Athletes	Race		
Athletes	Misses ^{2}	Time	Rank
René Arpin; Yvon Mougel; Marius Falguy; Jean-Claude Viry	5	2'07:34.42	7

^{2} A penalty loop of 200 metres had to be skied per missed target.

== Bobsleigh ==
Sled	Athletes	Event	Run 1		Run 2		Run 3		Run 4		Total	
Sled	Athletes	Event	Time	Rank	Time	Rank	Time	Rank	Time	Rank	Time	Rank
FRA-1	Gérard Christaud-Pipola; Michel Lemarchand	Two-man	57.43	12	57.73	16	57.78	14	58.08	18	3:51.02	15
FRA-2	Alain Roy; Serge Hissung	Two-man	57.58	14	57.43	11	57.58	11	57.95	15	3:50.54	13

Sled	Athletes	Event	Run 1		Run 2		Run 3		Run 4		Total	
Sled	Athletes	Event	Time	Rank	Time	Rank	Time	Rank	Time	Rank	Time	Rank
FRA-1	Gérard Christaud-Pipola; Alain Roy; André Belle; Serge Hissung	Four-man	55.75	11	55.66	9	56.43	10	57.06	10	3:44.90	10

== Cross-country skiing ==
Men

Event	Athlete	Race	
Event	Athlete	Time	Rank
15 km	Gérard Verguet	50:29.28	62
15 km	Roland Jeannerod	50:18.27	61
15 km	Daniel Drezet	48:56.97	51
15 km	Jean-Paul Pierrat	46:35.64	18
30 km	Michel Thierry	1'44:25.33	61
30 km	Pierre Salvi	1'41:06.69	54
30 km	Yves Blondeau	1'38:20.86	43
30 km	Jean-Paul Vandel	1'37:11.67	37
50 km	Roland Jeannerod	DNF	–
50 km	Pierre Salvi	DNF	–
50 km	Jean-Paul Vandel	2'47:45.20	29
50 km	Jean-Paul Pierrat	2'44:03.31	11

Men's 4 × 10 km relay

Athletes	Race	
Athletes	Time	Rank
Daniel Drezet; Jean-Paul Vandel; Yves Blondeau; Jean-Paul Pierrat	2'13:05.26	11

== Figure skating ==
Men

Athlete	CF	SP	FS	Points	Places	Rank
Jean-Christophe Simond	18	16	15	159.44	137	15

== Luge ==
Women

Athlete	Run 1		Run 2		Run 3		Run 4		Total	
Athlete	Time	Rank	Time	Rank	Time	Rank	Time	Rank	Time	Rank
Marie-Thérèse Bonnet	44.947	17	44.966	17	44.888	19	45.009	18	2:59.810	17

== Nordic combined ==
Events:

- normal hill ski jumping (Three jumps, best two counted and shown here.)
- 15 km cross-country skiing

Athlete	Event	Ski Jumping				Cross-country			Total	
Athlete	Event	Distance 1	Distance 2	Points	Rank	Time	Points	Rank	Points	Rank
Jacques Gaillard	Individual	71.0	72.0	181.0	27	52:08.87	182.90	24	363.90	25

== Speed skating ==
Men

Event	Athlete	Race	
Event	Athlete	Time	Rank
500 m	Emmanuel Michon	40.91	19
1000 m	Richard Tourne	1:26.75	27
1000 m	Emmanuel Michon	1:22.99	17
1500 m	Richard Tourne	2:06.43	20

== See also ==
- France at the 1976 Winter Paralympics
