= Cross-country skiing at the 1972 Winter Olympics – Men's 15 kilometre =

Men's 15 kilometre at the XI Olympic Winter Games
- Venue: Makomanai Cross Country Events Site
- Dates: 7 February 1972
- Competitors: 62 from 19 nations
- Winning time: 45:28.24

Medalists
1st place, gold medalist(s)		Sven-Åke Lundbäck; Sweden
2nd place, silver medalist(s)		Fyodor Simashov; Soviet Union
3rd place, bronze medalist(s)		Ivar Formo; Norway

The men's 15 kilometre cross-country skiing competition at the 1972 Winter Olympics in Sapporo, Japan, was held on Monday 7 February at the Makomanai Cross Country Events Site.

Each skier started at half a minute intervals, skiing the entire 15 kilometre course. Lars-Göran Åslund of Sweden was the 1970 World champion and Harald Grønningen of Norway was the defending Olympic champion from the 1968 Olympics in Grenoble, France.

== Results ==
Rank	Bib	Name	Country	Time	Deficit
1st place, gold medalist(s)	54	Sven-Åke Lundbäck	Sweden	45:28.24	–
2nd place, silver medalist(s)	52	Fyodor Simashov	Soviet Union	46:00.84	+32.60
3rd place, bronze medalist(s)	34	Ivar Formo	Norway	46:02.68	+34.44
4	57	Juha Mieto	Finland	46:02.74	+34.50
5	23	Yury Skobov	Soviet Union	46:04.59	+36.35
6	35	Axel Lesser	East Germany	46:17.01	+48.77
7	61	Walter Demel	West Germany	46:17.36	+49.12
8	37	Gunnar Larsson	Sweden	46:23.29	+55.05
9	9	Oddvar Brå	Norway	46:25.88	+57.64
10	38	Osmo Karjalainen	Finland	46:27.51	+59.27
11	59	Eduard Hauser	Switzerland	46:30.53	+1:02.29
12	12	Vladimir Voronkov	Soviet Union	46:33.43	+1:05.19
13	63	Gert-Dietmar Klause	East Germany	46:34.40	+1:06.16
14	28	Albert Giger	Switzerland	46:38.36	+1:10.12
15	46	Johs Harviken	Norway	46:46.36	+1:18.12
16	42	Valery Tarakanov	Soviet Union	46:48.32	+1:20.08
17	41	Alois Kälin	Switzerland	46:50.31	+1:22.07
18	29	Lars-Göran Åslund	Sweden	46:56.23	+1:27.99
19	58	Magne Myrmo	Norway	47:02.55	+1:34.31
20	15	Tord Backman	Sweden	47:22.97	+1:54.73
21	56	Stanislav Henych	Czechoslovakia	47:25.81	+1:57.57
22	36	Gerhard Gehring	West Germany	47:33.78	+2:05.54
23	24	Juhani Repo	Finland	47:56.16	+2:27.92
24	53	Carlo Favre	Italy	47:59.07	+2:30.83
25	49	Gerd Heßler	East Germany	48:04.15	+2:35.91
26	3	Rainer Groß	East Germany	48:05.86	+2:37.62
27	47	Tonio Biondini	Italy	48:10.09	+2:41.85
28	22	Franco Stella	Italy	48:17.14	+2:48.90
29	39	Ján Fajstavr	Czechoslovakia	48:18.22	+2:49.98
30	21	Ján Michalko	Czechoslovakia	48:31.64	+3:03.40
31	55	Roland Jeannerod	France	48:32.42	+3:04.18
32	14	Hartmut Döpp	West Germany	48:46.08	+3:17.84
33	50	Jan Staszel	Poland	48:46.72	+3:18.48
34	16	Hansüli Kreuzer	Switzerland	48:55.37	+3:27.13
35	8	Manne Liimatainen	Finland	48:59.90	+3:31.66
36	27	Franz Betz	West Germany	49:00.41	+3:32.17
37	19	Hideo Tanifuji	Japan	49:06.97	+3:38.73
38	30	Heinrich Wallner	Austria	49:17.97	+3:49.73
39	44	Jean-Paul Vandel	France	49:22.89	+3:54.65
40	17	Franco Nones	Italy	49:35.43	+4:07.19
41	60	Kunio Shibata	Japan	49:38.95	+4:10.71
42	51	Herbert Wachter	Austria	49:44.13	+4:15.89
43	40	Akiyoshi Matsuoka	Japan	49:50.72	+4:22.48
44	26	Everett Dunklee	United States	49:52.20	+4:23.96
45	43	Malcolm Hunter	Canada	49:54.08	+4:25.84
46	33	Daniel Cerisey	France	50:05.88	+4:37.64
47	25	Petar Pankov	Bulgaria	50:06.74	+4:38.50
48	4	Gérard Granclement	France	50:07.11	+4:38.87
49	62	Fred Kelly	Canada	50:07.22	+4:38.98
50	32	Roger Allen	Canada	50:41.31	+5:13.07
51	6	Motoharu Matsumura	Japan	50:43.76	+5:15.52
52	11	Jarl Omholt-Jensen	Canada	50:52.14	+5:23.90
53	2	Ventseslav Stoyanov	Bulgaria	50:54.98	+5:26.74
54	45	Tim Caldwell	United States	51:17.92	+5:49.68
55	13	Ronny Yeager	United States	51:36.54	+6:08.30
56	20	Danzangiin Narantungalag	Mongolia	52:06.18	+6:37.94
57	1	Namsrain Sandagdorj	Mongolia	52:48.54	+7:20.30
58	64	Larry Martin	United States	53:13.91	+7:45.67
59	48	Terence Palliser	Great Britain	54:11.98	+8:43.74
60	31	Peter Strong	Great Britain	54:41.99	+9:13.75
61	5	Harry Tobin	Great Britain	56:05.05	+10:36.81
62	18	Liang Reng-guey	Republic of China	1:03:35.66	+18:07.42
	7	Josef Hauser	Austria	DNF	
	10	Ján Ilavský	Czechoslovakia	DNS	
