= Luge at the 1976 Winter Olympics – Women's singles =

Women's singles at the XII Olympic Winter Games
- Venue: Olympic Sliding Centre Innsbruck
- Dates: 4–7 February 1976
- Competitors: 26 from 12 nations
- Winning time: 2:50.621

Medalists
| 1st place, gold medalist(s) | | Margit Schumann | East Germany |
| 2nd place, silver medalist(s) | | Ute Rührold | East Germany |
| 3rd place, bronze medalist(s) | | Elisabeth Demleitner | West Germany |

The Women's singles luge competition at the 1976 Winter Olympics in Innsbruck was held from 4 to 7 February, at Olympic Sliding Centre Innsbruck.

== Results ==
| Rank | Athlete | Country | Run 1 | Run 2 | Run 3 | Run 4 | Total |
|---|---|---|---|---|---|---|---|
| 1st place, gold medalist(s) | Margit Schumann | East Germany | 42.854 | 42.830 | 42.285 | 42.652 | 2:50.621 |
| 2nd place, silver medalist(s) | Ute Rührold | East Germany | 42.926 | 42.708 | 42.439 | 42.773 | 2:50.846 |
| 3rd place, bronze medalist(s) | Elisabeth Demleitner | West Germany | 43.138 | 42.535 | 42.388 | 42.995 | 2:51.056 |
| 4 | Eva-Maria Wernicke | East Germany | 43.007 | 42.646 | 42.711 | 42.898 | 2:51.262 |
| 5 | Antonia Mayr | Austria | 42.949 | 42.812 | 42.633 | 42.966 | 2:51.360 |
| 6 | Margit Graf | Austria | 43.094 | 42.790 | 42.555 | 43.020 | 2:51.459 |
| 7 | Monika Scheftschik | West Germany | 42.863 | 42.732 | 42.981 | 42.964 | 2:51.540 |
| 8 | Angelika Schafferer | Austria | 43.444 | 43.007 | 42.793 | 43.078 | 2:52.322 |
| 9 | Vera Zozuļa | Soviet Union | 44.179 | 42.973 | 42.651 | 42.858 | 2:52.661 |
| 10 | Dana Beldová-Spálenská | Czechoslovakia | 43.560 | 43.063 | 43.178 | 43.405 | 2:53.206 |
| 11 | Sarah Felder | Italy | 44.056 | 43.118 | 43.075 | 43.374 | 2:53.623 |
| 12 | Teresa Bugajczyk | Poland | 43.621 | 43.701 | 43.157 | 43.450 | 2:53.929 |
| 13 | Barbara Piecha | Poland | 44.060 | 43.722 | 43.378 | 43.800 | 2:54.960 |
| 14 | Halina Kanasz | Poland | 43.967 | 45.138 | 43.499 | 43.731 | 2:56.335 |
| 15 | Veronica Holmsten | Sweden | 44.751 | 44.635 | 44.456 | 44.766 | 2:58.608 |
| 16 | Maria-Luise Rainer | Italy | 44.943 | 44.848 | 44.768 | 44.972 | 2:59.531 |
| 17 | Marie-Thérèse Bonnet | France | 44.947 | 44.966 | 44.888 | 45.009 | 2:59.810 |
| 18 | Agneta Lindskog | Sweden | 46.050 | 44.581 | 44.771 | 44.541 | 2:59.943 |
| 19 | Mieko Ogawa | Japan | 45.341 | 45.263 | 44.907 | 45.219 | 3:00.730 |
| 20 | Teruko Yamada | Japan | 45.482 | 45.155 | 44.943 | 45.228 | 3:00.808 |
| 21 | Kathleen Ann Roberts-Homstad | United States | 45.413 | 45.744 | 44.848 | 45.346 | 3:01.351 |
| 22 | Carole Keyes | Canada | 45.654 | 45.692 | 45.200 | 45.337 | 3:01.883 |
| 23 | Mary Jane Bowie | Canada | 45.804 | 45.719 | 45.352 | 45.466 | 3:02.341 |
| 24 | Karen Roberts | United States | 46.366 | 46.142 | 45.581 | 45.994 | 3:04.083 |
| 25 | Maura Haponski | United States | 46.547 | 45.877 | 45.818 | 46.329 | 3:04.571 |
| 26 | Julie Chase | Canada | 46.529 | 46.570 | 51.633 | 48.790 | 3:13.522 |
