= Butteri =

Butteri is the plural form of Buttero, a shepherd or cowboy in parts of central Italy.

Butteri may also refer to:

- Angiola Guglielma Butteri, 17th-century Italian artist and nun
- Francesco Butteri (born 1954), Italian bobsledder
- Giovanni Maria Butteri (1540–1606), Italian painter
