= Mieko =

- Gender: Female

Origin
- Origin: Japanese
- Meaning: Different meanings depending on the kanji used

Mieko (written: 美恵子, 美枝子, 美江子, 美栄子, 未映子, 三枝子 or 允枝子) is a feminine Japanese given name. Notable people with the name include:

- Mieko Chikappu (チカップ 美恵子; 1948–2010), Japanese Ainu embroiderer, artist, poet, essayist, and Indigenous activist
- Mieko Fukui (福井 美恵子; 1956–1980), Japanese women's basketball player
- Mieko Fukuno (福野 美恵子; born 1947 or 1948), Japanese former international table tennis player
- Mieko Harada (原田 美枝子; born 1958), Japanese actress
- Mieko Hirota (弘田 三枝子; 1947–2020), Japanese singer
- Mieko Kamimoto (神本 美恵子; born 1948), Japanese politician
- Mieko Kamiya (神谷 美恵子; 1914–1979), Japanese psychiatrist
- Mieko Kanai (金井 美恵子; born 1947), Japanese writer
- Mieko Kato (加藤 三重子; born 1980), Japanese retired goalball player
- Mieko Kawakami (川上 未映子; born 1976), Japanese singer and writer
- Mieko Kobayashi (小林 美恵子; born 1958), Japanese politician
- Mieko Miyahara (宮原 美江子; born 1960), Japanese fencer
- Mieko Mori (森 美恵子; born 1966), Japanese gymnast
- Mieko Nagaoka (長岡 三重子; 1914–2021), Japanese Masters athlete
- Mieko Ogawa (born 1949), Japanese luger
- Mieko Ouchi (born 1969), Canadian actress, director and playwright
- Mieko Satō (佐藤 実絵子; born 1986), Japanese former idol of the idol group SKE48
- Mieko Shiomi (汐見 美枝子; 1909–1984), Japanese photographer
- Mieko Shiomi (composer) (塩見 允枝子; born 1938), Japanese artist and composer
- Mieko Takamine (高峰 三枝子; 1918–1990), Japanese actress and singer
- Mieko Takizawa (瀧澤 美恵子; 1939–2020), Japanese novelist
- Mieko Yagi (八木 三枝子; 1950–2015), Japanese equestrian
- Mieko Yoshimura (吉村 美栄子; born 1951), Japanese politician
