= Bottero =

Bottero or Bottéro may refer to:

- Angelica Bottero, Italian artist and nun of the seventeenth century
- Evangelina Bottero (1859–1950), Italian teacher and populariser of science
- Jean Bottéro (1914–2007), French historian
- Mónica Bottero (b. 1964), Uruguayan journalist
- Pierre Bottero (1964–2009), French writer
- Rita Bottero (Margherita Bottero) (1937–2014), Italian cross-country skier, competitor at the 1956 Winter Olympics
