= Graham Sweet =

British bobsledder

Personal information
- Nationality: British
- Born: 26 October 1948 (age 76); Pontypridd, Wales

Sport
- Sport: Bobsleigh

Graham Sweet (born 26 October 1948) is a British bobsledder. He competed in the four man event at the 1976 Winter Olympics. He also competed at the FIBT World Championships in 1975, where his team came in 12th place.
