= Helena Balatková =

Helena Balatková may refer to:

- Helena Šikolová (née Balatková, born 1949), Czechoslovak cross-country skier
- Helena Erbenová (née Balatková, born 1979), Czech cross-country skier and triathlete
