= Douglas Elliott =

Douglas Elliott may refer to:

- Douglas Hemphill Elliott (1921–1960), member of the U.S. House of Representatives
- Douglas Elliott (skier) (born 1950), British cross-country skier
- Doug Elliott (born 1962), Canadian musician

== See also ==
- Doug Elliot (disambiguation)
