= Rudolf Schmid =

Rudolf Schmid may refer to:

- Rudolf Schmid (bishop) (1914–2012), German prelate of the Roman Catholic Church
- Rudolf Schmid (bobsleigh) (born 1945), Swiss Olympic bobsledder
- Rudolf Schmid (luger) (1951–2014), former luger from Austria

== See also ==
- Rudolf Schmidt (disambiguation)
