= Roseanne Allen =

Canadian cross-country skier

Roseanne Allen (March 7, 1954 – June 20, 2009) was a Canadian cross-country skier who competed in the 1972 Winter Olympics.

== Early life ==
Allen was born in Aklavik, Northwest Territories as a member of the Gwich'in First Nation. At age eight, Allen went to Grollier Hall residential school in Inuvik, Northwest Territories. There, she learned how to ski at age 10. Allen was amongst several Aboriginal children, other notable examples being Gwich’in First Nation skiers Shirley and Sharon Firth, who were recruited and trained through the Territorial Experimental Ski Training program.

== Career ==
In 1968, at age 13, she became the youngest Canadian ever to win a gold medal at the Canadian Junior Nordic Ski Championships, winning the 5 km race with a time of 25 minutes and 33 seconds. She won gold at the Top of the World Ski Championship in 1971. Allen was amongst the first Canadian Aboriginal women to be selected to compete in the Olympics, and in the 1972 Olympics in Sapporo, Japan, Allen competed in two cross-country skiing events. In the Women's 5 kilometer, she placed 10th, and in the Women's 3x5 kilometer relay, she placed 40th.

Roseanne Allen was posthumously inducted into the NWT Sport Hall of Fame in 2019.

== Personal life ==
After a short career as a competitive cross-country skier, she retired from the national team in 1974 at the age of 20. In 1988, she moved to Sault Ste. Marie, Ontario and began a career in health at the Indian Friendship Centre. Allen married Mark Billingsley, and had a son, Nathan Allen.

On June 20, 2009, Allen died at the age of 55.

== Cross-country skiing results ==
=== Olympic Games ===
Year	Age	5 km	10 km	3 × 5 km relay
1972	18	40	—	10
