= Risto Kiiskinen =

Finnish cross-country skier

Personal information
- Nationality: Finnish
- Born: 20 July 1956 (age 69) Lieksa, Finland

Sport
- Sport: Cross-country skiing

Risto Kiiskinen (born 20 July 1956) is a Finnish cross-country skier. He competed in the men's 15 kilometre event at the 1976 Winter Olympics.

He also competed at the 1978 World Championships, and was expected to be a part of the 4 × 10 km relay team, but was edged out by Esko Lähtevänoja.

== Cross-country skiing results ==
=== Olympic Games ===
Year	Age	15 km	30 km	50 km	4 × 10 km relay
1976	21	32	—	—	—

=== World Championships ===
Year	Age	15 km	30 km	50 km	4 × 10 km relay
1978	23	—	16	—	—
