= Skinstad =

Skinstad is a surname. Notable people with the surname include:

- Bobby Skinstad (born 1976), South African rugby union player
- Hans Skinstad (born 1946), Canadian cross-country skier
