= Franz Jacob =

Franz Jacob may refer to:

- Franz Jacob (bobsleigh), Austrian bobsledder
- Franz Jacob (Resistance fighter) (1906–1944), German Resistance fighter
- Franz G. Jacob (1870–?), German chess master
