= Leif Johansson =

Leif Johansson may refer to:

- Leif Johansson (bobsleigh) (born 1950), Swedish Olympic bobsledder
- Leif Johansson (businessman) (born 1951), Swedish businessman
- Leif Johansson (tennis) (born 1952), Swedish former tennis player
