= Council on Foreign Relations =

American foreign policy think tank

- Headquarters located in the former Harold Pratt House
- Abbreviation: CFR
- Founded: 1921; 105 years ago
- Type: 501(c)(3) think tank
- Tax ID no.: 13-1628168
- Headquarters: Harold Pratt House, 58 East 68th Street, Manhattan
- Location: New York City, U.S.
- Members: 5,397 (2025)
- President: Michael Froman
- Chairman: David Rubenstein
- Revenue: $99,083,520 (2025)
- Expenses: $104,175,520 (2025)
- Endowment: $671,993,900 (2025)
- Website: www.cfr.org

The Council on Foreign Relations (CFR) is an American think tank focused on U.S. foreign policy and international relations. Founded in 1921, it is an independent and nonpartisan 501(c)(3) nonprofit organization. CFR is based in New York City, with an additional office in Washington, D.C. Its membership has included senior politicians, secretaries of state, CIA directors, bankers, lawyers, professors, corporate directors, CEOs, and prominent media figures.

CFR meetings convene government officials, global business leaders, and prominent members of the intelligence and foreign-policy communities to discuss international issues. CFR publishes the bi-monthly journal Foreign Affairs since 1922. It also runs the David Rockefeller Studies Program, which makes recommendations to presidential administrations and the diplomatic community, testifies before Congress, interacts with the media, and publishes research on foreign policy issues.

Michael Froman is the organization's 15th president.

== History ==
=== Origins, 1918 to 1945 ===
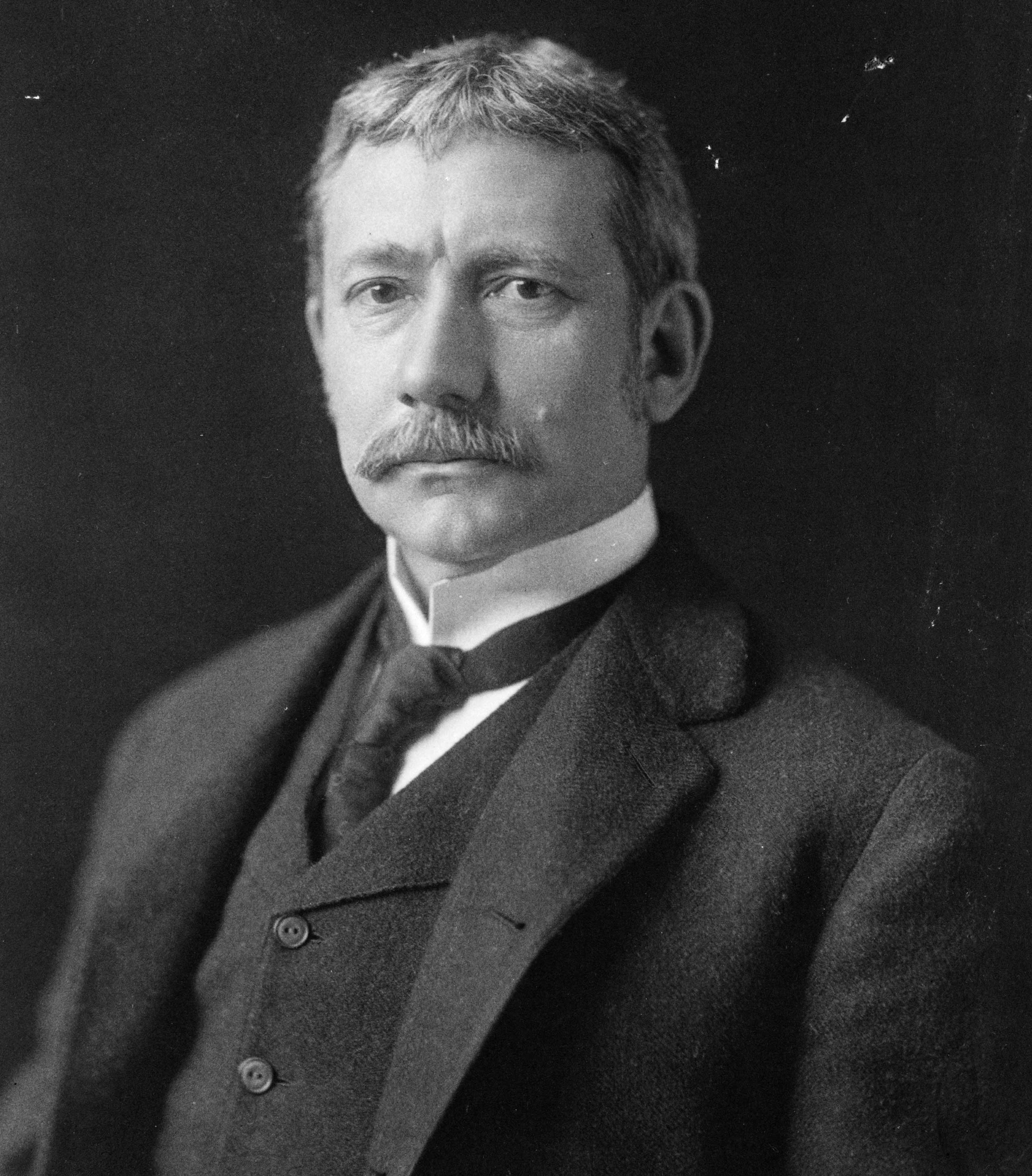
Elihu Root (1845–1937) served as the first honorary president (1921–1937) of the Council on Foreign Relations. (Pictured 1902, age 57).

In September 1917, near the end of World War I, President Woodrow Wilson established a working fellowship of about 150 scholars called "The Inquiry", tasked with briefing him about options for the postwar world after Germany was defeated. This academic group, directed by Wilson's closest adviser and long-time friend "Colonel" Edward M. House, and with Walter Lippmann as Head of Research, met to assemble the strategy for the postwar world. The team produced more than 2,000 documents detailing and analyzing the political, economic, and social facts globally that would be helpful for Wilson in the peace talks. Their reports formed the basis for the Fourteen Points, which outlined Wilson's strategy for peace after the war's end. These scholars then traveled to the Paris Peace Conference 1919 and participated in the discussions there.

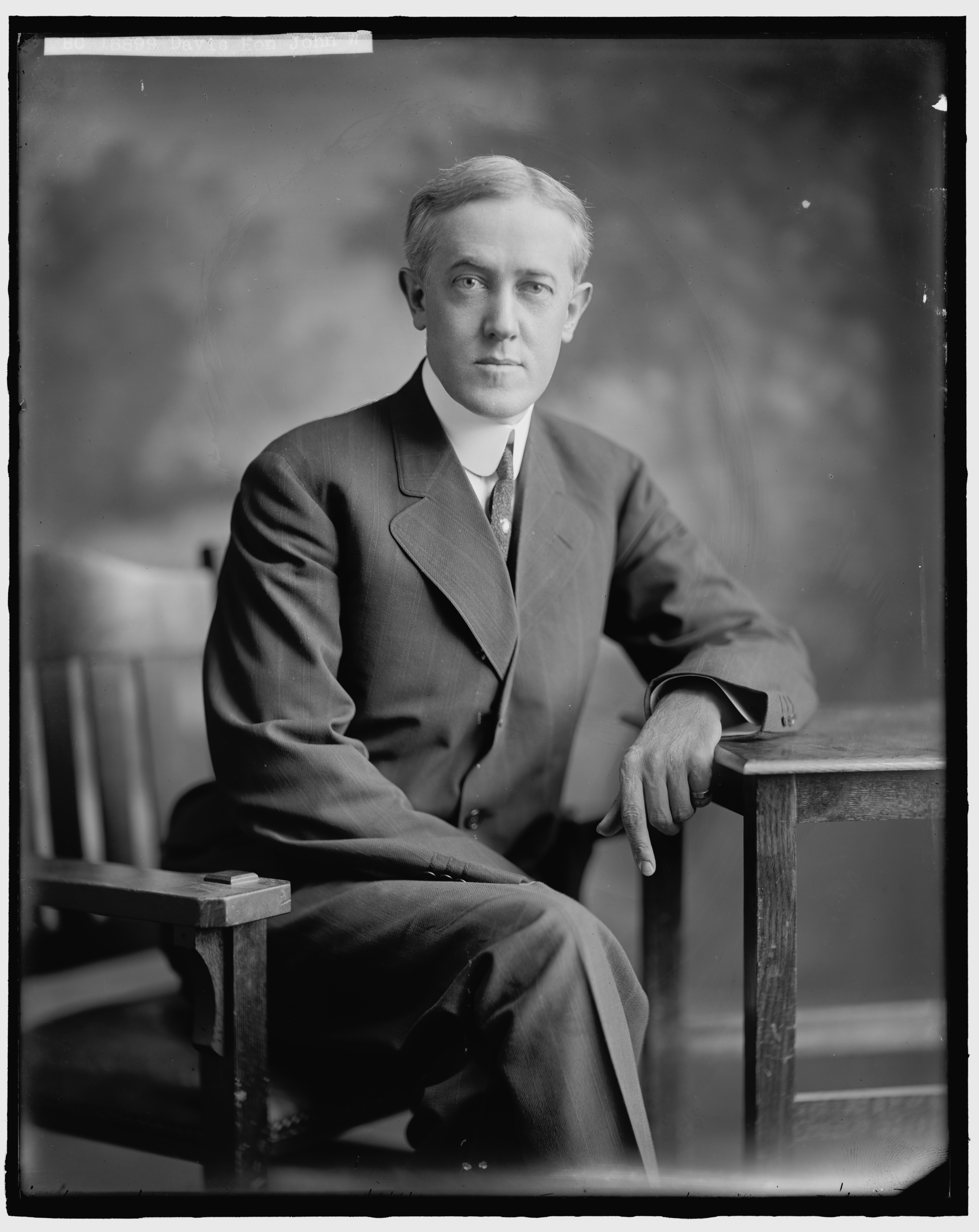
John W. Davis was the first elected CFR president.

As a result of discussions at the Peace Conference, a small group of British and American diplomats and scholars met on May 30, 1919, at the Hotel Majestic in Paris. They decided to create an organization called "The Institute of International Affairs", which would have offices in London and New York. Ultimately, the British and American delegates formed separate institutes, with the British developing the Royal Institute of International Affairs (also known as Chatham House) in London. Due to the isolationist views prevalent in American society at that time, the scholars had difficulty gaining traction with their plan and turned their focus instead to a set of discreet meetings which had been taking place since June 1918 in New York City under the name "Council on Foreign Relations". The meetings were headed by corporate lawyer Elihu Root, who had served as Secretary of State under President Theodore Roosevelt, and attended by 108 "high-ranking officers of banking, manufacturing, trading and finance companies, together with many lawyers".

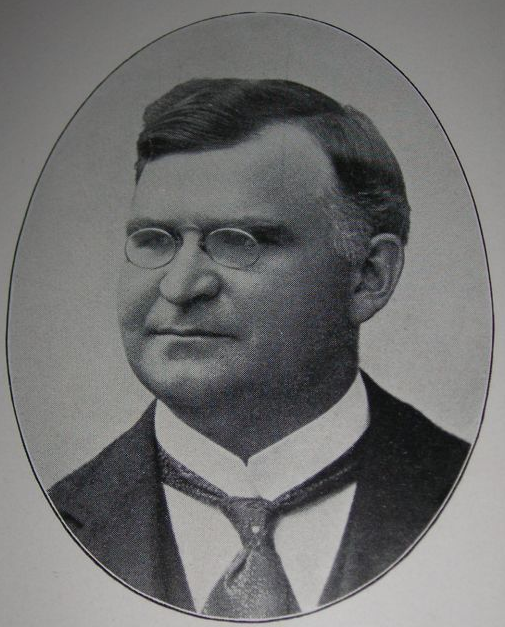
First CFR vice-president, attorney Paul Drennan Cravath

The members supported Wilson's internationalist vision but were especially concerned about "the effect that the war and the treaty of peace might have on postwar business". Scholars from the Inquiry saw an opportunity to establish an organization that would bring together diplomats, senior government officials, and academics with lawyers, bankers, and industrialists to influence public policy. On July 29, 1921, they filed a certification of incorporation, officially forming the Council on Foreign Relations. Founding members included its first honorary president Elihu Root, its first elected president John W. Davis, vice-president Paul D. Cravath, and secretary–treasurer Edwin F. Gay.

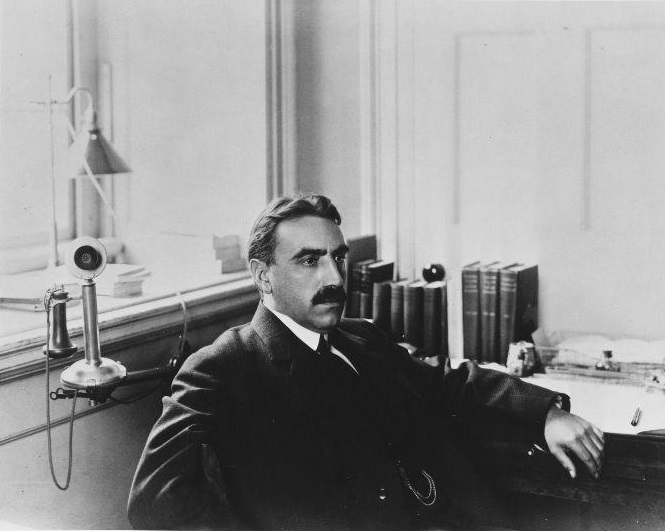
Harvard Business School economist Edwin F. Gay, 1908

In 1922, Gay, who was a former dean of the Harvard Business School and director of the Shipping Board during the war, headed the Council's efforts to begin publication of a magazine that would be the "authoritative" source on foreign policy. He gathered US$125,000 (equivalent to $2,404,324 in 2025) from the wealthy members on the council, as well as by sending letters soliciting funds to "the thousand richest Americans". Using these funds, the first issue of Foreign Affairs was published in September 1922. Within a few years, it had gained a reputation as the "most authoritative American review dealing with international relations".

In the late 1930s, the Ford Foundation and Rockefeller Foundation began financially supporting the Council. In 1938, they created various Committees on Foreign Relations, which later became governed by the American Committees on Foreign Relations in Washington, D.C., throughout the country, funded by a grant from the Carnegie Corporation. Influential men were to be chosen in a number of cities, and would then be brought together for discussions in their own communities as well as participating in an annual conference in New York. These local committees served to influence local leaders and shape public opinion to build support for the Council's policies, while also acting as "useful listening posts" through which the Council and U.S. government could "sense the mood of the country".

During the Second World War, the Council achieved much greater prominence within the government and the State Department, when it established the strictly confidential War and Peace Studies, funded entirely by the Rockefeller Foundation. The secrecy surrounding this group was such that the Council members who were not involved in its deliberations were completely unaware of the study group's existence. It was divided into four functional topic groups: economic and financial; security and armaments; territorial; and political. The security and armaments group was headed by Allen Welsh Dulles, who later became a pivotal figure in the CIA's predecessor, the Office of Strategic Services (OSS). CFR ultimately produced 682 memoranda for the State Department, which were marked classified and circulated among the appropriate government departments.

=== Cold War era, 1945 to 1979 ===
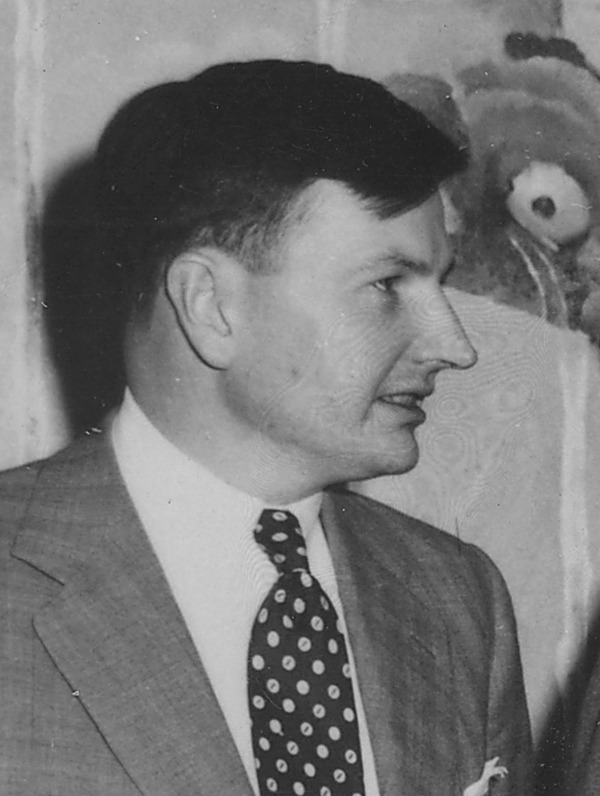
David Rockefeller (1915–2017) joined the Council in 1941 and was appointed as a director in 1949.

A critical study found that of 502 government officials surveyed from 1945 to 1972, more than half were members of the Council. During the Eisenhower administration 40% of the top U.S. foreign policy officials were CFR members (Eisenhower himself had been a council member); under Truman, 42% of the top posts were filled by council members. During the Kennedy administration, this number rose to 51%, and peaked at 57% under the Johnson administration.

In 1947, CFR study group member George Kennan anonymously published an article in Foreign Affairs titled "The Sources of Soviet Conduct", in which he introduced the concept of "containment". The essay became highly influential in shaping U.S. foreign policy over the course of the next seven presidential administrations. Forty years later, Kennan remarked that he had never believed the Soviet Union intended to attack the United States, assuming that point was so self-evident it required no explanation in the original essay. William Bundy credited CFR's study groups with helping to lay the framework of thinking that led to the Marshall Plan and NATO. Due to new interest in the group, membership grew to nearly 1,000.

Dwight D. Eisenhower chaired a CFR study group while he served as President of Columbia University. One member later said, "whatever General Eisenhower knows about economics, he has learned at the study group meetings." The CFR study group devised an expanded study group called "Americans for Eisenhower" to increase his chances for the presidency. Eisenhower would later draw many Cabinet members from CFR ranks and become a CFR member himself. His primary CFR appointment was Secretary of State John Foster Dulles. Dulles gave a public address at the Harold Pratt House in New York City in which he announced a new direction for Eisenhower's foreign policy: "There is no local defense which alone will contain the mighty land power of the communist world. Local defenses must be reinforced by the further deterrent of massive retaliatory power." After this speech, the council convened a session on "Nuclear Weapons and Foreign Policy" and chose Henry Kissinger to head it. Kissinger spent the following academic year working on the project at Council headquarters. The book of the same name that he published from his research in 1957 gave him national recognition, topping the national bestseller lists.

CFR played an important role in the creation of the European Coal and Steel Community. CFR promoted a blueprint of the ECSC and helped Jean Monnet promote the ESCS.

On November 24, 1953, a study group heard a report from political scientist William Henderson regarding the ongoing conflict between France and Vietnamese Communist leader Ho Chi Minh's Viet Minh forces, a struggle that would later become known as the First Indochina War. Henderson argued that Ho's cause was primarily nationalist in nature and that Marxism had "little to do with the current revolution." Further, the report said, the United States could work with Ho to guide his movement away from Communism. State Department officials, however, expressed skepticism about direct American intervention in Vietnam and the idea was tabled. Over the next twenty years, the United States would find itself allied with anti-Communist South Vietnam and against Ho and his supporters in the Vietnam War.

The Council served as a "breeding ground" for important American policies such as mutual deterrence, arms control, and nuclear non-proliferation.

In 1962 the group began a program of bringing select Air Force officers to the Harold Pratt House to study alongside its scholars. The Army, Navy and Marine Corps requested they start similar programs for their own officers.

A four-year-long study of relations between America and China was conducted by the Council between 1964 and 1968. One study published in 1966 concluded that American citizens were more open to talks with China than their elected leaders. Henry Kissinger, who had continued to publish in Foreign Affairs, was appointed by President Richard Nixon to serve as National Security Adviser in 1969. In 1971, he embarked on a secret trip to Beijing to broach talks with Chinese leaders. Nixon went to China in 1972, and diplomatic relations were completely normalized by President Carter's Secretary of State, another Council member, Cyrus Vance.

The Vietnam War created a rift within the organization. When Hamilton Fish Armstrong announced in 1970 that he would be leaving the helm of Foreign Affairs after 45 years, new chairman David Rockefeller approached a family friend, William Bundy, to take over the position. Anti-war advocates within the Council protested this appointment, claiming that Bundy's hawkish record in the State and Defense Departments and the CIA precluded him from taking over an independent journal. Some considered Bundy a war criminal for his prior actions.

In November 1979, while chairman of CFR, David Rockefeller became embroiled in an international incident when he and Henry Kissinger, along with John J. McCloy and Rockefeller aides, persuaded President Jimmy Carter through the State Department to admit the Shah of Iran, Mohammad Reza Pahlavi, into the US for hospital treatment for lymphoma. In his book White House Diary, Carter wrote of the affair: "April 9 [1979] David Rockefeller came in, apparently to induce me to let the shah come to the United States. Rockefeller, Kissinger, and Brzezinski seem to be adopting this as a joint project". This action directly precipitated what is known as the Iran hostage crisis and placed Rockefeller under intense media scrutiny (particularly from The New York Times) for the first time in his public life.

== Membership ==
The CFR has two types of membership: life membership; and term membership, which lasts for 5 years and is available only to those between the ages of 30 and 36. Only U.S. citizens (native born or naturalized) and permanent residents who have applied for U.S. citizenship are eligible. A candidate for life membership must be nominated in writing by one Council member and seconded by a minimum of three others. Visiting fellows are prohibited from applying for membership until they have completed their fellowship tenure.

Corporate membership is divided into "Associates", "Affiliates", "President's Circle", and "Founders". All corporate executive members have opportunities to hear speakers, including foreign heads of state, chairmen and CEOs of multinational corporations, and U.S. officials and Congressmen. President and premium members are also entitled to attend small, private dinners or receptions with senior American officials and world leaders.

The CFR has a Young Professionals Briefing Series designed for young leaders interested in international relations to be eligible for term membership.

Women were excluded from membership until the 1960s.

== Board members ==
As of 2025, members of CFR's board of directors include:

- David M. Rubenstein (chairman) – cofounder and co-chief executive officer, The Carlyle Group, regent of the Smithsonian Institution, chairman of the board of Duke University, co-chair of the board at the Brookings Institution, president of the Economic Club of Washington, owner of the Baltimore Orioles
- Blair Effron (vice chairman) – cofounder, Centerview Partners
- Jami Miscik (vice chairman) – senior advisor at Lazard Geopolitical Advisory and chief executive officer of Global Strategic Insights; former chief executive officer and vice chairman, Kissinger Associates, Inc.; former global head of sovereign risk at Lehman Brothers; senior advisor to Barclays Capital
- Michael Froman (president) – former vice chairman and president of strategic growth at Mastercard; former U.S. trade representative (2013–2017) under President Barack Obama
- Nicholas F. Beim − partner at Venrock
- Afsaneh Mashayekhi Beschloss − founder and chief executive officer, RockCreek
- Margaret Brennan − moderator, Face the Nation; chief foreign affairs correspondent, CBS News
- Sylvia Mathews Burwell – president, American University; former United States Secretary of Health and Human Services (2014–2017) under President Barack Obama
- Kenneth I. Chenault − chairman and managing director, General Catalyst
- Tony Coles − executive chairman, Cerevel Therapeutics; co-founder and co-chair of the Black Economic Alliance
- Cesar Conde – chairman, NBCUniversal News Group
- Thomas Donilon
- Michèle Flournoy – cofounder and managing partner, WestExec Advisors; cofounder, former chief executive officer, and now chair of the Center for a New American Security (CNAS)
- Jane Fraser – chief executive officer, Citi
- Stephen Freidheim – chief investment officer, founder, managing partner, Cyrus Capital Partners L.P.
- James P. Gorman – executive chairman, Morgan Stanley
- Margaret (Peggy) Hamburg − former US FDA commissioner; former foreign secretary, National Academy of Medicine
- William Hurd − former U.S. representative for Texas's 23rd congressional district (2015−2021); former CIA clandestine officer
- Charles R. Kaye − chief executive officer, Warburg Pincus
- Christopher Liddell
- William H. McRaven – professor of national security, Lyndon B. Johnson School of Public Affairs, University of Texas at Austin
- Justin Muzinich – chief executive officer, Muzinich & Company; former U.S. Deputy Secretary of the Treasury (2018–2021)
- Janet Napolitano – professor of public policy, Goldman School of Public Policy, University of California, Berkeley, former U.S. Attorney (1993–1997), Attorney General of Arizona (1999–2003), Governor of Arizona (2003–2009), and President Obama's first Homeland Security Secretary (2009–2013)
- Meghan L. O'Sullivan − director of Belfer Center for Science and International Affairs, Jeane Kirkpatrick Professor of the Practice of International Affairs, Harvard Kennedy School
- Deven J. Parekh – managing director, Insight Partners
- Charles Phillips − managing partner and cofounder, Recognize
- Richard L. Plepler – founder and chief executive officer, Eden Productions
- Ruth Porat – president, chief investment officer, and chief financial officer, Alphabet and Google
- Laurene Powell Jobs
- L. Rafael Reif – president emeritus, Massachusetts Institute of Technology
- Mariko Silver – president and chief executive officer, The Henry Luce Foundation; former president, Bennington College
- James D. Taiclet – chairman, president, and chief executive officer, Lockheed Martin; associate fellow of the American Institute of Aeronautics and Astronautics
- Linda Thomas-Greenfield
- Frances Fragos Townsend − executive vice president of corporate affairs, corporate secretary, chief compliance officer, Activision Blizzard
- Tracey T. Travis – executive vice president of finance and chief financial officer, Estée Lauder Companies
- Fareed Zakaria – host, CNN's Fareed Zakaria GPS; columnist for the Washington Post, contributing editor for the Atlantic; former managing editor of Foreign Affairs (1992–2000)
- Amy Zegart – Morris Arnold and Nona Jean Cox senior fellow at the Hoover Institution

== As a charity ==
The Council on Foreign Relations received a three-star rating (out of four stars) from Charity Navigator in fiscal year 2016, as measured by an analysis of the council's financial data and "accountability and transparency". In fiscal year 2023, the council received a four-star rating (98 percent) from Charity Navigator.

== Reception ==
In an article for The Washington Post, Richard Harwood described the membership of the CFR as "the nearest thing we have to a ruling establishment in the United States".

The CFR has been criticized for its perceived elitism and influence over U.S. foreign policy, with detractors arguing that it serves as a networking hub for government officials, corporate executives, and media figures, reinforcing an establishment consensus that prioritizes globalist policies over national interests.

In 2019, CFR was criticized for accepting a donation from Len Blavatnik, a Ukrainian-born billionaire with close links to Vladimir Putin. The council was reported to be under fire from its own members and dozens of international affairs experts over its acceptance of a $12 million gift to fund an internship program. Fifty-five international relations scholars and Russia experts wrote a letter to the organization's board and CFR president Richard N. Haass:

"It is our considered view that Blavatnik uses his 'philanthropy'—funds obtained by and with the consent of the Kremlin, at the expense of the state budget and the Russian people—at leading western academic and cultural institutions to advance his access to political circles. We regard this as another step in the longstanding effort of Mr. Blavatnik—who ... has close ties to the Kremlin and its kleptocratic network—to launder his image in the West."

Critics have accused the CFR of promoting interventionist foreign policies, stating that its reports and recommendations have often supported U.S. military interventions and regime-change efforts. Some opponents say that its influence contributes to a bipartisan consensus that favors global military engagement, neoliberalism, and the interests of multinational corporations.

== Publications ==
=== Periodicals ===
==== Foreign Affairs ====
- The council publishes the international affairs magazine Foreign Affairs. It also establishes independent task forces, which bring together various experts to produce reports offering both findings and policy prescriptions on foreign policy topics. CFR has sponsored more than fifty reports, including the Independent Task Force on the Future of North America that published report No. 53, entitled Building a North American Community, in May 2005.
- The United States in World Affairs (annual)
- Political Handbook of the World (annual)

=== Books ===
- Tobin, Harold J. & Bidwell, Percy W. Mobilizing Civilian America. New York: Council on Foreign Relations, 1940.
- Savord, Ruth. American Agencies Interested in International Affairs. Council on Foreign Relations, 1942.
- Barnett, A. Doak. Communist China and Asia: Challenge To American Policy. New York: Harper & Brothers, 1960. LCCN 60-5956
- Bundy, William P. (ed.). Two Hundred Years of American Foreign Policy. New York University Press, 1977. ISBN 978-0814709900
- Clough, Michael. Free at Last? U.S. Policy Toward Africa and the End of the Cold War. New York: Council on Foreign Relations Press, 1991. ISBN 0876091001
- Mandelbaum, Michael. The Rise of Nations in the Soviet Union: American Foreign Policy and the Disintegration of the USSR. New York: Council on Foreign Relations Press, 1991. ISBN 978-0876091005
- Gottlieb, Gidon. Nation Against State: A New Approach to Ethnic Conflicts and the Decline of Sovereignty. New York: Council on Foreign Relations Press, 1993. ISBN 0876091591
- Bruce Hoffman & Jacob Ware God, Guns, Sedition: Far Right Terrorism in America

A Council on Foreign Relations book, Columbia University Press, New York, 2024, 448 pages
ISBN 9780231211222

=== Reports ===
- "Confronting Reality in Cyberspace: Foreign Policy for a Fragmented Internet" recommends reconsideration of U.S. cyber, digital trade and online freedom policies which champion a free and open internet, as having failed.
- US-Taiwan Relations in a New Era - Responding to a More Assertive China, Independent Task Force Report No. 81, co-chaired by Susan M. Gordon and Michael G. Mullen, directed by David Sacks.

== See also ==
- Members of the Council on Foreign Relations

== General and cited sources ==
- Shoup, Laurence and Minter, William (1977). Imperial Brain Trust: the Council on Foreign Relations and United States Foreign Policy. New York: Monthly Review Press.
- Parmar, Inderjeet (2004). Think Tanks and Power in Foreign Policy: A Comparative Study of the Role and Influence of the Council on Foreign Relations and the Royal Institute of International Affairs, 1939−1945. London: Palgrave.
- Schulzinger, Robert D. (1984). The Wise Men of Foreign Affairs. New York: Columbia University Press. ISBN 0231055285.
- Wala, Michael (1994). The Council on Foreign Relations and American Foreign Policy in the Early Cold War. Providence, RI: Berghann Books. ISBN 157181003X.
- Grose, Peter (2006). Continuing the Inquiry: the Council on Foreign Relations from 1921 to 1996. New York: Council on Foreign Relations Press.
