= Doug Hansen =

Doug Hansen may refer to:

- Doug Hansen (baseball) (1928–1998), American baseball player
- Doug Hansen (luger) (born 1948), Canadian luger
- Doug Hansen, 1990 Peace and Freedom candidate in California's 43rd congressional district
- Doug Hansen (Everest), mailman and amateur mountain climber who died in the 1996 Mount Everest disaster
- Doug Hansen, chief technical officer of M-DISC
