= Siegfried Radandt =

German bobsledder (1935–2026)

Personal information
- Nationality: German
- Born: 29 September 1935 Stuttgart, Gau Württemberg-Hohenzollern, Germany
- Died: 8 January 2026 (aged 90)

Sport
- Sport: Bobsleigh

Siegfried Radandt (29 September 1935 – 8 January 2026) was a German bobsledder. He competed in the four man event at the 1976 Winter Olympics.

Radandt died on 8 January 2026, at the age of 90.
