= Teresa Bugajczyk =

Polish luger (born 1953)

Personal information
- Nationality: Polish
- Born: 3 November 1953 (age 71); Cieplice Śląskie-Zdrój, Poland

Sport
- Sport: Luge

Teresa Bugajczyk (born 3 November 1953) is a Polish luger. She competed in the women's singles event at the 1976 Winter Olympics.
