= Hans Morant =

German bobsledder

Personal information
- Nationality: German
- Born: 7 October 1947 (age 77); Sulimice, Poland

Sport
- Sport: Bobsleigh

Hans Morant (born 7 October 1947) is a German bobsledder. He competed in the four man event at the 1976 Winter Olympics.
