= Franco Perruquet =

Italian bobsledder (born 1950)

Medal record

Bobsleigh

World Championships
Gold medal – first place	1975 Cervinia	Two-man

Franco Perruquet (born 25 December 1950) is an Italian bobsledder who competed in the mid-1970s. He won a gold medal in the two-man event at the 1975 FIBT World Championships in Cervinia.

Perruquet also finished eighth in the two-man event at the 1976 Winter Olympics in Innsbruck.
