= Adriano Bee =

Italian bobsledder (born 1952)

Personal information
- Nationality: Italian
- Born: 5 August 1952 (age 72); Lamon, Italy

Sport
- Sport: Bobsleigh

Adriano Bee (born 5 August 1952) is an Italian bobsledder. He competed in the four man event at the 1976 Winter Olympics.
