= Guido Casty =

Swiss bobsledder

Medal record

Bobsleigh

World Championships
Silver medal – second place	1974 St. Moritz	Four-man

Guido Casty is a Swiss bobsledder who competed in the mid-1970s. He won a silver medal in the four-man event at the 1974 FIBT World Championships in St. Moritz.
