= Peter Strong =

British cross-country skier (born 1946)

Personal information
- Nationality: British
- Born: 23 May 1946 (age 78)

Sport
- Sport: Cross-country skiing

Peter Strong (born 23 May 1946) is a British cross-country skier. He competed in the men's 15 kilometre event at the 1972 Winter Olympics.
