= Stan Bohonek =

Canadian figure skater

Personal information
- Full name: Stanislav Bohonek
- Born: December 28, 1952 (age 73) Prague, Czechoslovakia

Figure skating career
- Country: Canada
- Retired: 1976

Stanislav "Stan" Bohonek (born December 28, 1952) is a Canadian former competitive figure skater. He represented Canada at the 1976 Winter Olympics in Innsbruck.

== Early life ==
Stanislav Bohonek was born December 28, 1952, in Prague, Czechoslovakia. His brother, Jan, was born about three years later. The family moved to Toronto, Ontario, Canada in 1968 due to the Warsaw Pact invasion of Czechoslovakia.

== Skating career and later life ==
Bohonek competed mainly in single skating. He also studied classical ballet and competed briefly in pair skating, appearing on the novice level with Jayne Elliott.

Bohonek won the bronze medal at the 1975 Canadian Championships. After repeating as national bronze medalist the following year, he was named in Canada's team to the 1976 Winter Olympics. He placed 14th in men's single skating at the event in Innsbruck, Austria.

In the 1976–77 season, Bohonek withdrew from the Ontario-Quebec divisionals due to a tender Achilles tendon in his left foot.

After graduating from the University of Toronto with a bachelor's degree in biology, Bohonek obtained a master's degree in biology at Cleveland State University. He then studied at Case Western Reserve University's dental school, graduating in 1987, and opened a private practice in Westlake, Ohio, in 1989. With his brother, he wrote and illustrated a children's book about dental health.

== Competitive results ==
International
Event	69–70	70–71	71–72	72–73	73–74	74–75	75–76
Winter Olympics							14th
Skate Canada						8th	
St. Gervais			4th				
National
Canadian Champ.	1st N	1st J	6th	6th	4th	3rd	3rd
Levels – N: Novice; J: Junior
