= Heinz Krenn =

Austrian bobsledder

Personal information
- Nationality: Austrian
- Born: 9 July 1947 (age 78) Hall in Tirol, Austria

Sport
- Sport: Bobsleigh

Heinz Krenn (born 9 July 1947) is an Austrian bobsledder. He competed in the four man event at the 1976 Winter Olympics.
