= FIBT World Championships 1974 =

Winter sport competition

1974 World Championships
- Location: St. Moritz, Switzerland

The FIBT World Championships 1974 took place in St. Moritz, Switzerland for the record twelfth time. The Swiss city had hosted the event previously in 1931 (Four-man), 1935 (Four-man), 1937 (Four-man), 1938 (Two-man), 1939 (Two-man), 1947, 1955, 1957, 1959, 1965, and 1970.

== Two man bobsleigh ==
Pos	Team	Time
Gold	West Germany (Wolfgang Zimmerer, Peter Utzschneider)	
Silver	West Germany (Georg Heibl, Fritz Ohlwärter)	
Bronze	Switzerland (Fritz Lüdi, Karl Häseli)	

== Four man bobsleigh ==
Pos	Team	Time
Gold	West Germany (Wolfgang Zimmerer, Peter Utzschneider, Manfred Schumann, Albert Wurzer)	
Silver	Switzerland (Hans Candrian, Guido Casty, Yves Marchand, Gaudenz Beeli)	
Bronze	Austria (Werner Delle Karth, Walter Delle Karth, Hans Eichinger, Fritz Sperling)	

== Medal table ==
Rank	Nation	Gold	Silver	Bronze	Total
1	West Germany (FRG)	2	1	0	3
2	Switzerland (SUI)	0	1	1	2
3	Austria (AUT)	0	0	1	1
Totals (3 entries)		2	2	2	6
