= Doug Elliot =

Doug Elliot may refer to:

- Douglas Elliot, Scottish rugby union player
- Doug Elliot (politician), Australian politician
- Doug Elliot, baseball player and namesake of Elliot Ballpark

== See also ==
- Douglas Elliott (disambiguation)
