= Albert Wurzer =

German bobsledder

Medal record

Men's Bobsleigh

Representing West Germany

World Championships
Gold medal – first place	1974 St. Moritz	Four-man
Silver medal – second place	1975 Cervinia	Four-man

Albert Wurzer is a West German bobsledder who competed in the mid-1970s. He won two medals in the four-man event at the FIBT World Championships with a gold in 1974 and a silver in 1975.
