= Otto Breg =

Austrian bobsledder

Personal information
- Nationality: Austrian
- Born: 27 November 1949; Bruck an der Mur, Austria
- Died: 3 January 2010 (aged 60); Braunau am Inn, Austria

Sport
- Sport: Bobsleigh

Otto Breg (27 November 1949 – 3 January 2010) was an Austrian bobsledder. He competed in the four man event at the 1976 Winter Olympics.
