= Piero Vegnuti =

Italian bobsledder (born 1942)

Personal information
- Nationality: Italian
- Born: 1 April 1942 (age 83)

Sport
- Sport: Bobsleigh

Piero Vegnuti (born 1 April 1942) is an Italian former bobsledder. He competed in the four man event at the 1976 Winter Olympics.
