= Peter Brennan (bobsleigh) =

American bobsledder

Personal information
- Nationality: American
- Born: June 30, 1942 (age 84) Newburgh, New York, United States

Sport
- Sport: Bobsleigh

Peter Brennan (born June 30, 1942) is an American bobsledder. He competed in the four man event at the 1976 Winter Olympics.
