= Veronica Holmsten =

Swedish luger

Personal information
- Nationality: Swedish
- Born: 15 March 1956 (age 69); Stockholm, Sweden

Sport
- Sport: Luge

Veronica Holmsten (born 15 March 1956) is a Swedish luger. She competed in the women's singles event at the 1976 Winter Olympics.
