= Venanz Egger =

Swiss cross-country skier

Personal information
- Nationality: Swiss
- Born: 8 November 1954 (age 70)

Sport
- Sport: Cross-country skiing

Venanz Egger (born 8 November 1954) is a Swiss cross-country skier. He competed in the men's 50 kilometre event at the 1976 Winter Olympics.
