= Teruko Yamada =

Japanese luger (born 1956)

Personal information
- Nationality: Japanese
- Born: 6 June 1956 (age 68); Aomori, Japan

Sport
- Sport: Luge

Teruko Yamada (born 6 June 1956) is a Japanese luger. She competed in the women's singles event at the 1976 Winter Olympics.
