= Dieter Gehmacher =

Austrian bobsledder

Personal information
- Nationality: Austrian
- Born: 9 May 1949 (age 75); Salzburg, Austria

Sport
- Sport: Bobsleigh

Dieter Gehmacher (born 9 May 1949) is an Austrian bobsledder. He competed in the four man event at the 1976 Winter Olympics.
