= Manne Liimatainen =

Finnish cross-country skier (1943–2026)

Personal information
- Nationality: Finnish
- Born: 31 March 1943 Kannonkoski, Finland
- Died: 1 February 2026 (aged 82) Kuusamo

Sport
- Sport: Cross-country skiing

Manne Liimatainen (31 March 1943 – 1 February 2026) was a Finnish cross-country skier. He competed in the men's 15 kilometre event at the 1972 Winter Olympics.

== Cross-country skiing results ==
=== Olympic Games ===
| Year | Age | 15 km | 30 km | 50 km | 4 × 10 km relay |
|---|---|---|---|---|---|
| 1972 | 28 | 35 | — | — | — |
