= Lino Benoni =

Italian bobsledder (born 1950)

Personal information
- Nationality: Italian
- Born: 4 January 1950 (age 75); Arco, Italy

Sport
- Sport: Bobsleigh

Lino Benoni (born 4 January 1950) is an Italian bobsledder. He competed in the four man event at the 1976 Winter Olympics.
