= Christian Pfeuti =

Swiss cross-country skier

Personal information
- Nationality: Swiss
- Born: 6 November 1950 (age 74)

Sport
- Sport: Cross-country skiing

Christian Pfeuti (born 6 November 1950) is a Swiss cross-country skier. He competed in the men's 50 kilometre event at the 1976 Winter Olympics.
