= Earl Frisbie =

American bobsledder

Personal information
- Born: April 2, 1949 (age 77) Elizabethtown, New York, United States

Sport
- Sport: Bobsleigh

Earl Frisbie (born April 2, 1949) is an American bobsledder. He competed in the four man event at the 1976 Winter Olympics.
