= Gérard Granclement =

French cross-country skier (born 1948)

Personal information
- Nationality: French
- Born: 7 April 1948 (age 76)

Sport
- Sport: Cross-country skiing

Gérard Granclement (born 7 April 1948) is a French cross-country skier. He competed in the men's 15 kilometre event at the 1972 Winter Olympics.
