= Karen Roberts (luger) =

American luger

Personal information
- Born: June 16, 1954 (age 71) Miles City, Montana, United States

Sport
- Sport: Luge

Karen Roberts (born June 16, 1954) is an American luger. She competed in the women's singles event at the 1976 Winter Olympics.
