= Anthony Norton =

British bobsledder

Personal information
- Nationality: British
- Born: 27 February 1950 (age 75)

Sport
- Sport: Bobsleigh

Anthony Norton (born 27 February 1950) is a British bobsledder. He competed in the four man event at the 1976 Winter Olympics.
