= Rudolf Schmidt (disambiguation) =

Rudolf Schmidt (1886–1957) was Nazi German Panzer General.

Rudolf Schmidt may also refer to:

- Rudolf Schmidt (Major) (1914–2000), Major in the Luftwaffe, Nazi Germany
- Rudolf Schmidt (sculptor) (1894–1980), Austrian sculptor
- A nom de guerre of Nikolai Ivanovich Kuznetsov (1911–1944), Soviet intelligence agent and partisan

== See also ==
- Rudolf Schmid (disambiguation)
- Rudolf Schmitt (1830–1898), German chemist
