= Jürgen Wolf =

German cross-country skier (born 1952)

Personal information
- Nationality: German
- Born: 9 November 1952 (age 72); Clausnitz, East Germany

Sport
- Sport: Cross-country skiing

Jürgen Wolf (born 9 November 1952) is a former German cross-country skier. He competed in the men's 15 kilometre event at the 1976 Winter Olympics.
