= Jochen Babock =

East German bobsledder

Olympic medal record

Men's bobsleigh

Representing East Germany
Gold medal – first place	1976 Innsbruck	Four-man

European Championships
Gold medal – first place	1979	Four-man

Jochen Babock (born 26 August 1953 in Erfurt) is an East German bobsledder who competed in the mid-1970s. He won the gold medal in the four-man event at the 1976 Winter Olympics in Innsbruck.
