= Werner Camichel =

Swiss bobsledder (1945–2006)

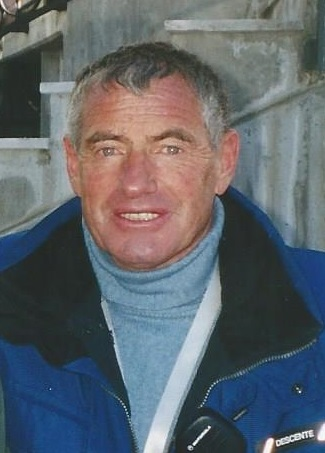

Medal record

Bobsleigh

Representing Switzerland

Olympic Games
Gold medal – first place	1972 Sapporo	Four-man

World Championships
Gold medal – first place	1973 Lake Placid	Four-man
Gold medal – first place	1975 Cervinia	Four-man

Werner Camichel (26 January 1945 – 27 March 2006 in Samaden) is a Swiss bobsledder who competed in the 1970s. He won the gold medal in the four-man event at the 1972 Winter Olympics in Sapporo.

Camichel also won two gold medals in the four-man event at the FIBT World Championships, winning them in 1973 and 1975.

Camichel carried the Swiss flag during the opening ceremonies of the 1976 Winter Olympics in Innsbruck. He later managed the bobsleigh, luge, and skeleton track in St. Moritz.

Camichel died from cancer in 2006.

His sons Corsin Camichel and Duri Camichel were ice hockey players.
