= Monika Scheftschik =

German luger

Personal information
- Nationality: German
- Born: 3 September 1953 (age 71); Passau, West Germany

Sport
- Sport: Luge

Monika Scheftschik (born 3 September 1953) is a German luger. She competed in the women's singles event at the 1976 Winter Olympics.
