= Gaudenz Beeli =

Swiss bobsledder

Medal record

Bobsleigh

World Championships
Silver medal – second place	1974 St. Moritz	Four-man

Gaudenz Beeli is a Swiss bobsledder who competed in the mid-1970s. He won a silver medal in the four-man event at the 1974 FIBT World Championships in St. Moritz.

Beeli also finished fourth in the four-man event at the 1972 Winter Olympics in Sapporo.
