= Walter Delle Karth =

Austrian bobsledder

Personal information
- Born: 11 August 1946 (age 79)
Medal record
Men's Bobsleigh
Representing Austria
World Championships
Silver medal – second place	1973 Lake Placid	Four-man
Bronze medal – third place	1974 St. Moritz	Four-man

Walter Delle Karth Jr. (Alternate listings: Walter delleKarth, Walter Delle-Karth, born 11 August 1946 in Innsbruck, Tyrol) is an Austrian bobsledder who competed from the early 1970s to the mid-1980s. He won two medals in the four-man event at the FIBT World Championships with a silver in 1973 and a bronze in 1974.

Competing in three Winter Olympics Delle Karth earned his best finish of fifth in the four-man event at Lake Placid in 1980.

In the 1985-86 Bobsleigh World Cup he finished second in the four-man championship.

He has two brothers, Werner and Dieter.

In later years Delle Karth worked as the agent of multiple Olympic, World and World Cup champion alpine skier Hermann Maier.
