= Duri Camichel =

Swiss ice hockey player

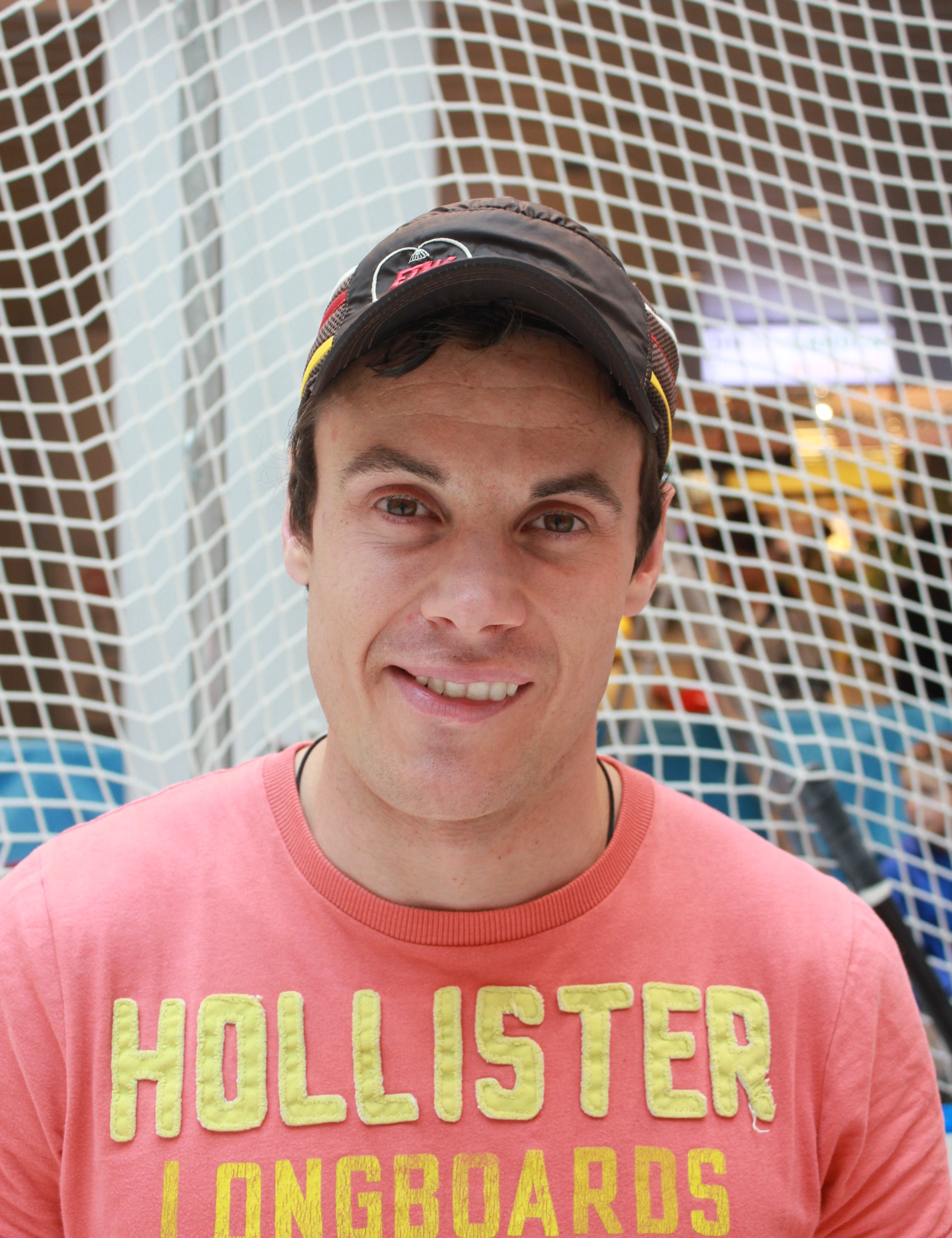
- Camichel in June 2013
- Born: 6 May 1982 Samedan, Switzerland
- Died: 28 April 2015 (aged 32) Costa Rica
- Height: 180 cm (5 ft 11 in)
- Weight: 77 kg (170 lb; 12 st 2 lb)
- Position: Forward
- Shot: Left
- Played for: EV Zug; Rapperswil-Jona
- National team: Switzerland
- Playing career: 1999–2014

Duri Camichel (6 May 1982 – 28 April 2015) was a Swiss professional ice hockey player.

Camichel died in a traffic collision in Costa Rica.

His father Werner Camichel was a bobsledder at the 1972 Winter Olympics.

== Career statistics ==
			Regular season					Playoffs
Season	Team	League	GP	G	A	Pts	PIM	GP	G	A	Pts	PIM
1997–98	EHC St. Moritz	SwissDiv1	2	0	1	1	—	—	—	—	—	—
1998–99	EV Zug U20	Elite Jr. B	—	—	—	—	—	—	—	—	—	—
1998–99	SC Seewen-Herti	SwissDiv1	6	1	2	3	—	2	1	0	1	—
1999–00	EV Zug U20	Elite Jr. A	33	10	18	28	34	2	0	1	1	4
1999–00	EV Zug	NLA	5	0	1	1	0	—	—	—	—	—
1999–00	EHC Seewen-Herti	SwissDiv1	7	3	5	8	—	2	0	0	0	—
2000–01	EV Zug U20	Elite Jr. A	8	1	4	5	20	—	—	—	—	—
2000–01	EV Zug	NLA	37	1	2	3	27	3	0	1	1	25
2000–01	EHC Basel	NLB	2	0	0	0	0	—	—	—	—	—
2001–02	EV Zug U20	Elite Jr. A	4	2	2	4	2	2	2	1	3	0
2001–02	EV Zug	NLA	43	3	3	6	24	6	0	0	0	6
2002–03	EV Zug	NLA	35	7	7	14	8	—	—	—	—	—
2003–04	EV Zug	NLA	45	11	14	25	28	5	0	2	2	2
2004–05	EV Zug	NLA	35	6	9	15	10	9	1	2	3	6
2005–06	EV Zug	NLA	40	10	15	25	64	7	1	4	5	4
2006–07	EV Zug	NLA	44	17	15	32	71	12	1	7	8	10
2007–08	EV Zug	NLA	46	14	32	46	77	—	—	—	—	—
2008–09	EV Zug	NLA	48	10	17	27	10	10	0	0	0	8
2009–10	EV Zug	NLA	47	3	8	11	46	13	1	2	3	10
2010–11	EV Zug	NLA	50	6	12	18	62	10	1	1	2	0
2011–12	EV Zug	NLA	46	6	12	18	24	2	0	0	0	0
2012–13	Rapperswil-Jona Lakers	NLA	45	6	11	17	98	—	—	—	—	—
2013–14	Rapperswil-Jona Lakers	NLA	38	5	4	9	26	—	—	—	—	—
NLA totals			604	105	162	267	575	77	5	19	24	71
