= William Hollrock =

American bobsledder

Personal information
- Born: February 15, 1940 (age 86) White Plains, New York, United States

Sport
- Sport: Bobsleigh

William Hollrock (born February 15, 1940) is an American bobsledder. He competed in the four man event at the 1976 Winter Olympics.
