= Maura Haponski =

American luger

Personal information
- Nationality: American
- Born: August 27, 1957 (age 68) Killeen, Texas, United States

Sport
- Sport: Luge

Maura Haponski (born August 27, 1957) is an American luger. She competed in the women's singles event at the 1976 Winter Olympics.
