= Akiko Akasaka =

Japanese cross-country skier (born 1951)

Personal information
- Nationality: Japanese
- Born: 14 May 1951 (age 73); Akita, Japan

Sport
- Sport: Cross-country skiing

Akiko Akasaka (赤坂 明子, Akasaka Akiko, born 14 May 1951) is a Japanese cross-country skier. She competed in the women's 5 kilometres at the 1972 Winter Olympics.
