= Gérard Verguet =

French cross-country skier (born 1949)

Personal information
- Nationality: French
- Born: 11 October 1949 (age 75)

Sport
- Sport: Cross-country skiing

Gérard Verguet (born 11 October 1949) is a French cross-country skier. He competed in the men's 15 kilometre event at the 1976 Winter Olympics.
