= Serge Hissung =

French bobsledder

Personal information
- Nationality: French
- Born: 19 September 1953 (age 71)

Sport
- Sport: Bobsleigh

Serge Hissung (born 19 September 1953) is a French bobsledder. He competed in the two man and the four man events at the 1976 Winter Olympics.
