= André Belle =

French bobsledder

Personal information
- Nationality: French
- Born: 8 July 1951 (age 74)

Sport
- Sport: Bobsleigh

André Belle (born 8 July 1951) is a French bobsledder. He competed in the four man event at the 1976 Winter Olympics.
