= Douglas Elliott (skier) =

British cross-country skier (born 1950)

Personal information
- Nationality: British
- Born: 14 February 1950 (age 75)

Sport
- Sport: Cross-country skiing

Douglas Elliott (born 14 February 1950) is a British cross-country skier. He competed in the men's 15 kilometre event at the 1976 Winter Olympics.
