= Hans Gehrig =

Canadian bobsledder

Personal information
- Nationality: Canadian
- Born: 17 August 1929; Zürich, Switzerland
- Died: 1989 (aged 59–60)

Sport
- Sport: Bobsleigh

Hans Gehrig (17 August 1929 – 1989) was a Canadian bobsledder. He competed at the 1968 Winter Olympics and the 1972 Winter Olympics.
