= Christopher Martin (bobsleigh) =

Canadian bobsledder

Personal information
- Born: 23 December 1945 (age 79); Montreal, Quebec, Canada

Sport
- Sport: Bobsleigh

Christopher Martin (born 23 December 1945) is a Canadian bobsledder. He competed in the four man event at the 1976 Winter Olympics.
