= Helena Šikolová =

Personal information
- Born: 25 March 1949 (age 77) Jablonec nad Nisou, Czechoslovakia

Sport
- Sport: Skiing
Medal record
Women's cross-country skiing
Representing Czechoslovakia
Olympic Games
Bronze medal – third place	1972 Sapporo	5 km

Helena Balatková (born Šikolová, 25 March 1949 in Jablonec nad Nisou, Czech pronunciation: [ˈɦɛlɛna ˈbalatkovaː ˈʃɪkolovaː]) is a former Czechoslovak cross-country skier who competed during the 1970s. She won a bronze medal in the 5 km event at the 1972 Winter Olympics in Sapporo, becoming the first Czech of either sex to win an Olympic medal in cross-country skiing.

Šikolová also finished fourth in the 10 km event at the 1970 FIS Nordic World Ski Championships.

She is mother of Helena Erbenová and mother-in-law of Lukáš Bauer.

== Cross-country skiing results ==
All results are sourced from the International Ski Federation (FIS).

=== Olympic Games ===
- 1 medal – (1 bronze)

Year	Age	5 km	10 km	3 × 5 km relay
1972	22	Bronze	7	6

=== World Championships ===
Year	Age	5 km	10 km	3 × 5 km relay
1970	20	—	4	5
