= Francesco Butteri =

Italian bobsledder (born 1954)

Personal information
- Nationality: Italian
- Born: 9 May 1954 (age 71); Civitanova Marche, Italy

Sport
- Sport: Bobsleigh

Francesco Butteri (born 9 May 1954) is an Italian bobsledder. He competed in the four man event at the 1976 Winter Olympics.
