= Fritz Ohlwärter =

German bobsledder

Medal record

Men's Bobsleigh

Representing West Germany

World Championships
Silver medal – second place	1974 St. Moritz	Two-man
Silver medal – second place	1975 Cervinia	Two-man
Silver medal – second place	1975 Cervinia	Four-man
Silver medal – second place	1979 Königssee	Two-man
Bronze medal – third place	1977 St. Moritz	Four-man

Fritz Ohlwärter (born 25 February 1948) is a West German bobsledder who competed during the mid to late 1970s. He won five medals at the FIBT World Championships with four silvers (Two-man: 1974, 1975, 1979; Four-man: 1975) and one bronze (Four-man: 1977).

Ohlwärter also finished fifth in the four-man event at the 1976 Winter Olympics in Innsbruck.
