= Marie-Thérèse Bonnet =

French luger (born 1955)

Personal information
- Nationality: French
- Born: 26 January 1955 (age 70); Villard-de-Lans, France

Sport
- Sport: Luge

Marie-Thérèse Bonnet (born 26 January 1955) is a French luger. She competed in the women's singles event at the 1976 Winter Olympics.
