= Mieko Ogawa =

Japanese luger (born 1949)

Personal information
- Nationality: Japanese
- Born: 13 February 1949 (age 76); Hokkaido, Japan

Sport
- Sport: Luge

Mieko Ogawa (born 13 February 1949) is a Japanese luger. She competed in the women's singles event at the 1976 Winter Olympics.
