= Hellen Sander =

Canadian cross-country skier (born 1954)

Hellen Sander (born 25 April 1954) is a Canadian former cross-country skier who competed in the 1972 Winter Olympics.

== Cross-country skiing results ==
=== Olympic Games ===
Year	Age	5 km	10 km	3 × 5 km relay
1972	17	41	40	—
