= David Veale (bobsled) =

Canadian bobsledder

Personal information
- Born: 25 April 1950 (age 74); Waterloo, Ontario, Canada

Sport
- Sport: Bobsleigh

David Veale (born 25 April 1950) is a Canadian bobsledder. He competed in the four man event at the 1976 Winter Olympics.
