= Daniel Drezet =

French cross-country skier (born 1952)

Personal information
- Nationality: French
- Born: 3 February 1952 (age 73)

Sport
- Sport: Cross-country skiing

Daniel Drezet (born 3 February 1952) is a French cross-country skier. He competed in the men's 15 kilometre event at the 1976 Winter Olympics.
