= Michael Shragge =

Canadian luger

Personal information
- Nationality: Canadian

Sport
- Sport: Luge

Michael Shragge is a Canadian luger. He competed in the men's singles and doubles events at the 1976 Winter Olympics.
