= Robert Safrata =

Canadian alpine skier (born 1957)

Robert Safrata (born 11 July 1957) is a Canadian former alpine skier who competed in the 1976 Winter Olympics.
