= Fritz Sperling =

Austrian bobsledder (1945–2022)

Medal record

Bobsleigh

World Championships
Silver medal – second place	1973 Lake Placid	Four-man
Bronze medal – third place	1974 St. Moritz	Four-man

Fritz Sperling (1 August 1945 – 16 September 2022) was an Austrian bobsledder who competed from the early 1970s to the early 1980s. He won two medals in the four-man event at the FIBT World Championships with a silver in 1973 and a bronze in 1974.

Competing in three Winter Olympics, Sperling earned his best finish of fourth in the two-man event at Innsbruck in 1976.

Sperling died on 16 September 2022, at the age of 77.
