= Karl Häseli =

Swiss bobsledder (born 1948)

Medal record

Bobsleigh

World Championships
Bronze medal – third place	1974 St. Moritz	Two-man
Bronze medal – third place	1975 Cervinia	Two-man

Karl Häseli (born 13 November 1948 in Zürich) is a Swiss bobsledder and track and field athlete who competed in the mid-1970s.

He won five gold medals in the Swiss bobsleigh championships with Fritz Lüdi, two bronze medals in the two-man event at the FIBT World Championships, earning them in 1974 and 1975, one silver medal in the four-man event at the 1973 European bobsleigh championships in Cervinia and one bronze medal at the European Championship in the two-man event in St. Moritz in 1976.

Häseli also finished ninth in the four-man event at the 1976 Winter Olympics in Innsbruck.
