= Julie Chase =

Canadian luger (born 1956)

Personal information
- Born: 28 February 1956 (age 69) Calgary, Alberta, Canada

Sport
- Sport: Luge

Julie Chase (born 28 February 1956) is a Canadian luger. She competed in the women's singles event at the 1976 Winter Olympics.
