= Colin Nelson (bobsleigh) =

Canadian bobsledder (born 1942)

Personal information
- Born: 17 November 1942 Montreal, Quebec, Canada

Sport
- Sport: Bobsleigh

Colin Nelson (born 17 November 1942) is a Canadian bobsledder. He competed in the two man and the four man events at the 1976 Winter Olympics. He also competed in the men's singles luge at the 1968 Winter Olympics.
