= Ján Ilavský =

Slovak cross-country skier (born 1942)

Personal information
- Nationality: Slovak
- Born: 27 May 1942 (age 82); Važec, Slovak Republic

Sport
- Sport: Cross-country skiing

Ján Ilavský (born 27 May 1942) is a Slovak cross-country skier. He competed in the men's 50 relay event at the 1972 Winter Olympics.
