= Reijo Puiras =

Canadian cross-country skier

Reijo Puiras (2 May 1952 – 4 August 2017) was a Canadian cross-country skier who competed in the 1976 Winter Olympics.
