= Andrew Faulds (bobsleigh) =

Canadian bobsledder

Personal information
- Born: 12 August 1944 (age 80); London, Ontario, Canada

Sport
- Sport: Bobsleigh

Andrew Faulds (born 12 August 1944) is a Canadian bobsledder. He competed at the 1968 Winter Olympics and the 1972 Winter Olympics.
