= Georg Heibl =

West German bobsledder

Medal record

Men's Bobsleigh

Representing West Germany

World Championships
Silver medal – second place	1974 St. Moritz	Two-man
Silver medal – second place	1975 Cervinia	Two-man

Georg Heibl (born 16 February 1935) is a West German bobsledder who competed in the 1970s. He won two silver medals in the two-man event at the FIBT World Championships, earning them in 1974 and 1975.

Heibl also finished fifth in the four-man event at the 1976 Winter Olympics in Innsbruck.
