= Jim Lavalley =

Canadian bobsledder

Personal information
- Born: 6 October 1948 (age 76); Montreal, Quebec, Canada

Sport
- Sport: Bobsleigh

Jim Lavalley (born 6 October 1948) is a Canadian bobsledder. He competed in the two man and the four man events at the 1976 Winter Olympics.
