= FIBT World Championships 1975 =

Winter sport championship held in 1975

1975 World Championships
- Location: Cervinia, Italy

The FIBT World Championships 1975 took place in Cervinia, Italy for the second time, hosting the event previously in 1971.

== Two man bobsleigh ==
Pos	Team	Time
Gold	Italy (Giorgio Alvera, Franco Perruquet)	
Silver	West Germany (Georg Heibl, Fritz Ohlwärter)	
Bronze	Switzerland (Fritz Lüdi, Karl Häseli)	

== Four man bobsleigh ==
Pos	Team	Time
Gold	Switzerland (Erich Schärer, Peter Schärer, Werner Carmichel, Josef Benz)	
Silver	West Germany (Wolfgang Zimmerer, Peter Utzschneider, Albert Wurzer, Fritz Ohlwärter)	
Bronze	Austria (Manfred Stengl, Gert Krenn, Franz Jacob, Armin Vilas)	

== Medal table ==
Rank	Nation	Gold	Silver	Bronze	Total
1	Switzerland (SUI)	1	0	1	2
2	Italy (ITA)	1	0	0	1
3	West Germany (FRG)	0	2	0	2
4	Austria (AUT)	0	0	1	1
Totals (4 entries)		2	2	2	6
