= Leif Johansson (bobsleigh) =

Swedish bobsledder (born 1950)

Personal information
- Full name: Leif Oskar Johansson
- Nationality: Swedish
- Born: 9 February 1950 (age 76)

Sport
- Sport: Bobsleigh

Leif Oskar Johansson (born 9 February 1950) is a Swedish bobsledder. He competed in the four man event at the 1976 Winter Olympics.

Johansson represented Djurgårdens IF.
