= Giorgio Alverà =

Italian bobsledder (1943–2013)

Medal record

Bobsleigh

World Championships
Gold medal – first place	1975 Cervinia	Two-man

Giorgio Alverà (7 August 1943 – 14 January 2013) was an Italian bobsleigher who competed in the mid-1970s. He won a gold medal in the two-man event at the 1975 FIBT World Championships in Cervinia. In the Italian championships he won thrice in the two-man event (from 1973 to 1975) and twice in the four-man event (1974, 1975).

At the 1976 Winter Olympics in Innsbruck, Alvera finished eighth in the two-man event and twelfth in the four-man event.
