= Fritz Lüdi =

Swiss bobsledder (born 1936)

Medal record

Bobsleigh

World Championships
Silver medal – second place	1977 St. Moritz	Two-man
Bronze medal – third place	1974 St. Moritz	Two-man
Bronze medal – third place	1975 Cervinia	Two-man

Fritz Lüdi born 1936 is a Swiss bobsledder who competed in the mid-1970s. He won three medals in the two-man event at the FIBT World Championships with a silver (1977) and two bronzes (1974, 1975).

Lüdi also competed at the 1964 and the 1976 Winter Olympics in Innsbruck, finishing 9th in the four-man event and 10th in the two-man event.

Together with Karl Häseli he won five gold medals at the Swiss bobsleigh championships in the two-man events.
