= Mieko Chikappu =

Japanese designer

- チカップ美恵子
- Born: Mieko Iga; 9 September 1948; Kushiro, Hokkaido, Japan
- Died: 5 February 2010 (aged 61); Sapporo, Hokkaido, Japan
- Known for: Embroidery, poetry, essays, activism

Mieko Chikappu (チカップ 美恵子 Chikappu Mieko, also rendered as Chikkap or Cikap Mieko, September 9, 1948 – February 5, 2010), born Mieko Iga (伊賀 美恵子 Iga Mieko), was a Japanese Ainu embroiderer, artist, poet, essayist, and Indigenous activist.

"Chikappu" is a rendering of the Ainu language word "cikap" (チカㇷ゚) meaning "bird".

== Biography ==
Chikappu was born in Kushiro on the island of Hokkaido to an Ainu family. Her uncle was the well-known Ainu elder (ekasi) Tasuke Yamamoto. From childhood, she learned Ainu embroidery as well as the Ainu folk music called upopo from her mother, the poet Fude Iga. Her older brother, Kazuaki Yamamoto, was also an Ainu activist. As a girl, she appeared in the 1963–1964 NHK-produced documentary film series The World of the Yukar (ユーカラの世界 Yūkara no sekai).

After moving to Tokyo, she began work as a colorist for animated works. Later, in 1983, she was one of the founders of the Rera Association for the Consideration of the Present of the Ainu People (アイヌ民族の現在を考えるレラの会 Ainu minzoku no genzai o kangaeru rera no kai)—eventually renamed to the Rera Association (レラの会 Rera no kai)—an association of ethnic Ainu living in the Tokyo area, and became heavily involved in Ainu rights movements. Around this time, she also started to make a living as a well-known embroidery artist of Ainu patterns, and eventually moved to Sapporo.

In 1969, a photograph of Chikappu as a young girl in Ainu clothing was published without permission in the scholarly book Ainu Ethnography (アイヌ民族誌 Ainu minzokushi). The image's caption describing the Ainu as a "dying race" (horobiyuku minzoku). When she learned of this, she wrote a letter of protest to the authors of the book, including the well-known Hokkaido poet Genzō Sarashina. Unsatisfied with their apology, in 1985 she filed a lawsuit against the authors and publishing company of this book for defamation and the violation of her portrait rights, a landmark case that came to be known as the "Ainu People Portrait Rights Trial" (アイヌ民族肖像権裁判 Ainu minzoku shōzōken saiban). The case was settled in 1988 with an apology to Chikappu and further conditions. The case caused a stir in Japan and started conversations regarding the state of ethnological and anthropological research on the Ainu people.

She continued to publish books and speak publicly about the dignity of the Ainu people, the establishment of their official status as an Indigenous people, and other issues from an Ainu perspective. Many of her writings centered on explaining the depth of Ainu culture, particularly embroidery. Other writings indicted modern Japan's exploitation and oppression of the Ainu. In regards to the Kuril Islands dispute, unlike the views of the dominant Ainu organization, the Hokkaido Utari Association, Chikkap and her association took the position of condemning Japan for driving the Ainu out of these "northern territories" in the 19th century and demanding their return. She was also an active participant in Peace Boat, a Japan-based non-government organization.

== Publications ==
- Chikappu, Mieko (1991-02-01). 風のめぐみ―アイヌ民族の文化と人権 [The blessings of the wind: Culture and human rights of the Ainu people] (in Japanese). Ochanomizu Shobo. ISBN 4-275-01408-1.
- Chikappu, Mieko (1994-07-20). アイヌ文様刺繡のこころ [The spirit of Ainu embroidery]. Iwanami Booklet (in Japanese). Iwanami Shoten. ISBN 4-00-003292-5.
- Chikappu, Mieko (2001-06-01). アイヌ・モシリの風 [The wind of Ainu Mosir] (in Japanese). Japan Broadcasting Publishing Association. ISBN 4-14-080614-1.
- Chikappu, Mieko; Mizuta, Muneko; Kitada, Yukie (2002-02-01). 山姥たちの物語―女性の原型と語りなおし [Tales of the Mountain Witches: The Archetype of Women and Retellings]. Gakugeishorin. ISBN 9784875170587.
- Chikappu, Mieko (2003-09-01). On a night when the moon drops shine - A prayer journey from Ainu Mosir to India. Gendaishokan. ISBN 9784768468647.
- Chikappu, Mieko (2005-02-01). 森と大地の言い伝え [Legends of the forest and earth] (in Japanese). Hokkaido Shimbun Press. ISBN 9784894533226.
- Chikappu, Mieko (2010-01-01). カムイの言霊 ―物語が織り成すアイヌ文様 [The words of Kamuy - Ainu patterns woven by stories] (in Japanese). Gendaishokan. ISBN 9784768456262.
- Chikappu, Mieko; Uemura, Yoshihiro (2011-09-07). チカップ美恵子の世界―アイヌ文様刺繡と詩作品集 [The World of Chikappu Mieko: Ainu Embroidery and Poetry Collection]. Hokkaido Shimbun Press. ISBN 9784894536135.

== Exhibitions ==
In 1992, a traveling exhibition of her work was brought to New York City, Los Angeles, and San Francisco.

From April 13 to June 27, 2012, an exhibition of her works entitled "Mieko Chikappu Exhibition: From the World of Ainu Pattern Embroidery and Poetry" (Chikappu Mieko ten~Ainu mon'yō shishū to shi no sekai kara~) was held at the Kushiro Art Museum, Hokkaido in her hometown of Kushiro.
