= Tom Overend =

Canadian speed skater

Personal information
- Nationality: Canadian
- Born: 30 April 1953 (age 71); Abbotsford, British Columbia, Canada

Sport
- Sport: Speed skating

Tom Overend (born 30 April 1953) is a Canadian speed skater. He competed in two events at the 1976 Winter Olympics.
