= Rudolf Schmid (bobsleigh) =

Swiss bobsledder (born 1945)

Personal information
- Nationality: Swiss
- Born: 13 July 1945 (age 79); Liezen, Steiermark
- Died: 21 October 2014; Oberwart, Burgenland (AUT)

Sport
- Sport: Bobsleigh

Rudolf Schmid (born 13 July 1945) is a Swiss bobsledder. He competed in the four man event at the 1976 Winter Olympics.
