= Harry Tobin =

British cross-country skier (born 1944)

Personal information
- Nationality: British
- Born: 26 November 1944 (age 80); Liskeard, England

Sport
- Sport: Cross-country skiing

Harry Tobin (born 26 November 1944) is a British cross-country skier. He competed in the men's 15 kilometre event at the 1972 Winter Olympics.
