= William Dunn (bobsleigh) =

Canadian bobsledder

Personal information
- Born: 23 June 1949 (age 75); Ottawa, Ontario, Canada

Sport
- Sport: Bobsleigh

William Dunn (born 23 June 1949) is a Canadian bobsledder. He competed in the four man event at the 1976 Winter Olympics.
