= Werner Delle Karth =

Austrian bobsledder

Medal record

Bobsleigh

World Championships
Silver medal – second place	1973 Lake Placid	Four-man
Bronze medal – third place	1974 St. Moritz	Four-man

Werner Delle Karth (Alternate listings: Werner delleKarth, Werner Delle-Karth) is an Austrian bobsledder who competed during the 1970s. He won two medals in the four-man event at the FIBT World Championships with a silver in 1973 and a bronze in 1974.

Competing in two Winter Olympics, Delle Karth earned his best finish of sixth in the four-man event at Innsbruck in 1976. He also took the Athlete's Oath at those same games.

Following his retirement from competition, Delle Karth embarked on a coaching career before serving as secretary general of the Austrian Bobsleigh and Skeleton Federation and as a member of the Fédération Internationale de Bobsleigh et de Tobogganing's Court of Arbitration.

Werner's brothers Dieter and Walter Delle Karth also competed for Austria in bobsleigh at the Winter Olympics. In addition one of Werner's sons Nico Delle Karth is a competitive sailor who has been ranked number 1 in the world in the 49er class and who finished fourth in this class at the 2012 Summer Olympics. Nico's older brother Jörg was a helicopter pilot who died after a crash in Gabon in 2012.
