= Christopher Frank (bobsleigh) =

Canadian bobsledder

Personal information
- Nationality: Canadian
- Born: 6 February 1949 (age 76); Bangor, Gwynedd, Wales

Sport
- Sport: Bobsleigh

Christopher Frank (born 6 February 1949) is a Canadian bobsledder. He competed in the four man event at the 1976 Winter Olympics.
