= Thomas Stehr =

Canadian bobsledder

Personal information
- Born: 15 May 1952 (age 72); Montreal, Quebec, Canada

Sport
- Sport: Bobsleigh

Thomas Stehr (born 15 May 1952) is a Canadian bobsledder. He competed in the four man event at the 1976 Winter Olympics.
