= Emmanuel Michon =

French speed skater (born 1955)

Emmanuel Michon (born 9 May 1955) is a former ice speed skater from France, who represented his native country at two consecutive Winter Olympics, starting in 1976 in Innsbruck, Austria. He skated also at the first Olympics in short track speed skating in Calgary [1988]. He was the national short track speed skating coach in Albertville [1992] and Lillehamer [1994].
