= Claude Perrot =

French alpine skier (born 1951)

Claude Perrot (French: [klod pɛʁo]; born 10 May 1951 in Moûtiers) is a retired French alpine skier who competed in the 1976 Winter Olympics, where he finished 29th in the Men's giant slalom.
