= Pierre Salvi =

French cross-country skier (born 1948)

Personal information
- Nationality: French
- Born: 8 April 1948 (age 76)

Sport
- Sport: Cross-country skiing

Pierre Salvi (born 8 April 1948) is a French cross-country skier. He competed in the men's 30 kilometre event at the 1976 Winter Olympics.
