= Angiola Guglielma Butteri =

17th-century Italian artist and nun

Angiola Guglielma Butteri, also known as Angelica Bottero, was a 17th-century Italian artist and nun. She died 26 July 1676 at 80 years old.

She entered the convent of Sant’Orsola in Casale, then capital of Monferrato, where she was instructed by Sister Francesca Caccia, daughter of the artist Moncalvo, or by Francesca’s sister Orsola Maddalena Caccia. Among her paintings is a representation of Saints Catherine, Agatha, and Apollonia, which is (or was) in the city’s cathedral.

Recently many works signed "C." were attributed to Angiola Guglielma Butteri.
