= Brian Vachon =

Canadian bobsledder

Personal information
- Born: 10 August 1951 (age 73); Moncton, New Brunswick, Canada

Sport
- Sport: Bobsleigh

Brian Vachon (born 10 August 1951) is a Canadian bobsledder. He competed at the 1976 Winter Olympics and the 1980 Winter Olympics.
