= Malcolm Hunter =

Canadian cross-country skier

Malcolm Hunter (born 23 May 1950) is a Canadian former cross-country skier who competed in the 1972 Winter Olympics.
