= Jarl Omholt-Jensen =

Canadian cross-country skier

Jan Omholt-Jensen
Personal information
- Nationality: Canadian
- Born: 5 June 1947 (age 77); Oslo, Norway
- Occupation: Cross-country skier

Sport
- Sport: Cross-country skiing

Jarl Omholt-Jensen (born 5 June 1947 in Oslo, Norway) is a Canadian former cross-country skier who competed in the 1972 Winter Olympics.

== Early life ==
Jarl Omholt-Jensen was born on 5 June 1947 in Oslo, Norway.
