= Carole Keyes =

Canadian luger

Personal information
- Born: 2 September 1952 (age 72); Woodstock, New Brunswick, Canada

Sport
- Sport: Luge

Carole Keyes (born 2 September 1952) is a Canadian luger. She competed at the 1976 Winter Olympics, the 1980 Winter Olympics and the 1984 Winter Olympics.
