= Gérard Christaud-Pipola =

French bobsledder

Personal information
- Nationality: French
- Born: 18 April 1947 (age 77); Voiron, France

Sport
- Sport: Bobsleigh

Gérard Christaud-Pipola (born 18 April 1947) is a French bobsledder. He competed at the 1968, 1972, 1976 and the 1984 Winter Olympics.
