= Fred Kelly (cross-country skier) =

Canadian cross-country skier

Fred Kelly (born 17 November 1952) is a Canadian former cross-country skier who competed in the 1972 Winter Olympics.
