= David McComb (luger) =

Canadian luger (born 1946)

Personal information
- Born: 7 June 1946 (age 78); Red Deer, Alberta, Canada

Sport
- Sport: Luge

David McComb (born 7 June 1946) is a Canadian luger. He competed at the 1972 Winter Olympics and the 1976 Winter Olympics.

He is married to Teresa Bellefleur and has two sons. He resides in Quebec.
