= Larry Arbuthnot =

Canadian luger (born 1947)

Personal information
- Nationality: Canadian/American
- Born: 9 May 1947 (age 77); Saint-Laurent, Quebec, Canada

Sport
- Sport: Luge

Larry Arbuthnot (born 9 May 1947) is a Canadian luger. He competed at the 1968 Winter Olympics, the 1972 Winter Olympics and the 1976 Winter Olympics, and served as Coach for the Canadian Luge Team at the 1980 Winter Olympics.
