= Edward Day (cross-country skier) =

Canadian cross-country skier

Edward Day (born 11 June 1949) is a Canadian former cross-country skier who competed in the 1976 Winter Olympics.
