= Bert Bullock =

Canadian cross-country skier

Bert Bullock (born 4 October 1955) is a Canadian former cross-country skier who competed in the 1976 Winter Olympics.
