= Ernie Lennie =

Canadian cross-country skier

Ernie Lennie (born 20 December 1953) is a Canadian former cross-country skier who competed in the 1976 Winter Olympics.
