= Shirley Firth =

Canadian cross-country skier (1953–2013)

Personal information
- Nationality: Canada
- Born: 31 December 1953 Aklavik, Northwest Territories, Canada
- Died: 30 April 2013 (aged 59) Yellowknife, Northwest Territories, Canada

Sport
- Sport: Skiing

World Cup career
- Seasons: 3 – (1982–1984)
- Indiv. starts: 17
- Indiv. podiums: 0
- Team starts: 0
- Overall titles: 0 – (11th in 1982)

Shirley Firth CM (31 December 1953 in Aklavik, Northwest Territories – 30 April 2013) was a Canadian cross-country skier who competed in four consecutive Winter Olympics in 1972, 1976, 1980 and 1984.

== Career ==
Of Metis descent and a member of the Gwich'in First Nation, Firth was one of the first indigenous North Americans to represent Canada in the Olympic Games. Firth was the recipient of the Order of Canada, the Queen Elizabeth II Golden Jubilee Medal, and the Queen Elizabeth II Diamond Jubilee Medal. She was also voted Canadian Women's Nordic Skier of the Year six times by Ski Racing Magazine.

She was the twin sister of fellow ski team member Sharon Firth. The sisters participated in the Territorial Experimental Ski Training program that introduced cross country skiing to northern Canada. Consequently, the sisters made the first ever Canadian cross-country ski team that competed in the 1972 Winter Olympics in Sapporo. They credit the many important lessons they learned while trapping and hunting in their remote home community to their skiing success. In addition to the four consecutive Winter Olympics, the sisters competed in four World Ski Championships, and were members of the National Cross Country Ski Team for an unprecedented 17 consecutive years. Firth won 29 Gold medals, 10 Silver medals, and 3 Bronze medals at the Canadian National Championship level. Together, the siblings accumulated 79 medals at the national championships, including 48 national titles, figures that no other athlete has come close to reaching. Firth won a total of 42 medals out of the 79 won by both herself and Sharon.

In 1972 the Canadian Ski Association awarded Firth the John Semelink Memorial Award for her contributions to skiing in Canada, which was shared with her sister. They became the first indigenous women to receive the Order of Sport, marking their induction into Canada's Sports Hall of Fame in 2015. Firth had previously received a National Aboriginal Achievement Award in the sports category in 2006. In 2008, Firth was inducted into the Hall of Fame of the Banff Sports.

== Cross-country skiing results ==
All results are sourced from the International Ski Federation (FIS).

Shirley Firth-Larsson was inducted into the NWT Sport Hall of Fame in 2012.

=== Olympic Games ===
Year	Age	5 km	10 km	20 km	3/4 × 5 km relay
1972	18	35	—	—N/a	10
1976	22	27	29	—N/a	7
1980	26	28	24	—N/a	8
1984	30	28	22	25	—

=== World Championships ===
Year	Age	5 km	10 km	20 km	4 × 5 km relay
1978	24	36	30	34	9
1980	26	—N/a	—N/a	9	—N/a
1982	28	—	—	12	—

=== World Cup ===
==== Season standings ====
Season	Age	Overall
1982	28	11
1983	29	25
1984	30	25

== Personal life ==
Shirley Firth Larsson was the daughter of Stephen Firth (Métis) born November 20, 1922, at the Northwest Territories (NWT) and Fanny Rose Greenland (Métis) born January 21, 1922, also in NWT. Following her athletic career, Firth went on to live in France where she raised a family and lectured on the Dene and Inuit cultures. Firth died at her home in Yellowknife, Northwest Territories, on 30 April 2013, at the age of 59.

The two sisters were also the subjects of a CBC Documentary entitled The Olympians: The Firth Sisters. In honour of Firth's memory, the Canada Post put her and her twin sister Sharon's faces on their stamp. Firth was honoured at Canada's Sports Hall of Fame in Calgary's Olympic Park, by her spouse and daughters.
