= Sharon Firth =

Canadian cross-country skier (born 1953)

Personal information
- Nationality: Canada
- Born: December 31, 1953 (age 72) Aklavik, Northwest Territories, Canada

Sport
- Sport: Skiing

World Cup career
- Seasons: 3 – (1982–1984)
- Indiv. starts: 12
- Indiv. podiums: 0
- Team starts: 0
- Overall titles: 0 – (29th in 1982)

Sharon Firth CM ONWT (born 31 December 1953) is a Canadian former cross-country skier who competed in the Winter Olympics in 1972, 1976, 1980 and 1984. Firth's mother was Gwich'in and her father was Métis. She and her sister grew up in the Gwich'in First Nation.

She is the twin sister of fellow ski team member Shirley Firth. They became the first indigenous women to be awarded the Order of Sport, marking their induction into Canada's Sports Hall of Fame in 2015. Firth received a National Aboriginal Achievement Award in the sports category in 2005. Sharon Firth also received the John Semmelink Memorial Award in 1972, the Commissioner’s Award in 1981, the Order of Canada in 1987, and the Queen's Golden Jubilee Medal in 2002. In 1990, Firth was inducted into the Canadian Ski Museum and Skiing Hall of Fame. She was inducted into the NWT Sport Hall of Fame in 2012.

From 1968 to 1985, Sharon and Shirley Firth were both members of Canada’s national cross-country team. They were the first female Indigenous athletes to compete for Canada in the Winter Olympic Games. The twins obtained a total of 79 medals at the national championships.

== Training ==
Sharon and Shirley Firth participated in the fledgling Territorial Experimental Ski Training (TEST) Program, established by Father Jean Marie Mouchet and funding from Pierre Trudeau's Federal Government in 1965. The program began in Old Crow, Yukon, and eventually expanded to include Inuvik, run out of Groller Hall Residential School, where the sisters attended school.

"They didn't have an easy upbringing and were very timid when they first came. Of all the skiers I had they were the most competitive and determined. In Inuvik, we often skied at forty-five below zero; their lungs were used to cold weather." - Coach Bjorger Pettersen

== Life after skiing ==
Following Sharon Firth’s cross-country skiing career, she moved to Yellowknife, Northwest Territories. Firth worked for the government of the Northwest Territories and became a Youth Program Advisor.

=== Honours ===
Firth was awarded an honorary doctorate of laws from the University of Alberta in 2017 with the help from Patrick Reid. She was made a member of the Order of the Northwest Territories in 2018. She was awarded the Member of the Order of Canada (CM) as per the Canada Gazette of 26 December 1987.

== Cross-country skiing results ==
All results are sourced from the International Ski Federation (FIS).

=== Olympic Games ===
Year	Age	5 km	10 km	20 km	3/4 × 5 km relay
1972	18	26	24	—N/a	10
1976	22	29	28	—N/a	7
1980	26	35	—	—N/a	—
1984	30	29	29	21	—

=== World Championships ===
Year	Age	5 km	10 km	20 km	4 × 5 km relay
1982	28	—	—	18	—

=== World Cup ===
==== Season standings ====
Season	Age	Overall
1982	28	29
1983	29	35
1984	30	45
