= Doug Hansen (luger) =

Canadian luger (born 1948)

Personal information
- Born: 3 October 1948 (age 76); Woodstock, New Brunswick, Canada

Sport
- Sport: Luge

Doug Hansen (born 3 October 1948) is a Canadian luger. He competed at the 1972 Winter Olympics and the 1976 Winter Olympics.
