= Hans Skinstad =

Canadian cross-country skier

Hans Petter Fjeld Skinstad (born 13 June 1946 in Nord-Odal, Norway) is a Canadian former cross-country skier who competed in the 1976 Winter Olympics.
