= Austria at the 1976 Winter Olympics =

- IOC code: AUT
- NOC: Austrian Olympic Committee
- Website: www.olympia.at (in German)

in Innsbruck
- Competitors: 77 (63 men, 14 women) in 10 sports
- Flag bearer: Franz Klammer (alpine skiing)
- Medals Ranked 7th: Gold 2 Silver 2 Bronze 2 Total 6

Winter Olympics appearances (overview)
- 1924; 1928; 1932; 1936; 1948; 1952; 1956; 1960; 1964; 1968; 1972; 1976; 1980; 1984; 1988; 1992; 1994; 1998; 2002; 2006; 2010; 2014; 2018; 2022; 2026

Austria was the host nation for the 1976 Winter Olympics in Innsbruck. It was the second time that Austria had hosted the Winter Games, after the 1964 Winter Olympics, also in Innsbruck.

== Medalists ==
Medal	Name	Sport	Event
Gold	Franz Klammer	Alpine Skiing	Men's downhill
Gold	Karl Schnabl	Ski Jumping	Men's Large Hill
Silver	Brigitte Totschnig	Alpine Skiing	Women's downhill
Silver	Anton Innauer	Ski Jumping	Men's Large Hill
Bronze	Franz Schachner; Rudolf Schmid	Luge	Doubles
Bronze	Karl Schnabl	Ski Jumping	Men's Normal Hill

== Alpine skiing ==
Men

Athlete	Event	Race 1		Race 2		Total	
Athlete	Event	Time	Rank	Time	Rank	Time	Rank
Anton Steiner	Downhill					DNF	–
Klaus Eberhard	Downhill					1:48.45	19
Sepp Walcher	Downhill					1:47.45	9
Franz Klammer	Downhill					1:45.73	1st place, gold medalist(s)
Thomas Hauser	Giant slalom	DNF	–	–	–	DNF	–
Franz Klammer	Giant slalom	DNF	–	–	–	DNF	–
Alois Morgenstern	Giant slalom	1:48.33	18	DNF	–	DNF	–
Hansi Hinterseer	Giant slalom	1:46.46	7	1:47.34	19	3:33.80	14
Hansi Hinterseer	Slalom	DNF	–	–	–	DNF	–
Anton Steiner	Slalom	1:06.02	27	1:08.88	21	2:14.90	22
Alois Morgenstern	Slalom	1:01.61	7	1:05.37	8	2:07.18	7

Women

Athlete	Event	Race 1		Race 2		Total	
Athlete	Event	Time	Rank	Time	Rank	Time	Rank
Irmgard Lukasser	Downhill					1:49.18	12
Monika Kaserer	Downhill					1:48.81	9
Nicola Spieß	Downhill					1:47.71	4
Brigitte Totschnig	Downhill					1:46.68	2nd place, silver medalist(s)
Irmgard Lukasser	Giant slalom					1:35.38	29
Regina Sackl	Giant slalom					1:31.78	19
Brigitte Totschnig	Giant slalom					1:31.48	16
Monika Kaserer	Giant slalom					1:30.49	6
Monika Kaserer	Slalom	DNF	–	–	–	DNF	–
Regina Sackl	Slalom	DNF	–	–	–	DNF	–
Nicola Spieß	Slalom	n/a	?	DNF	–	DNF	–
Brigitte Totschnig	Slalom	49.17	14	DNF	–	DNF	–

== Biathlon ==
Men

Event	Athlete	Time	Penalties	Adjusted time ^{1}	Rank
20 km	Klaus Farbmacher	1'20:31.07	16	1'36:31.07	49
20 km	Franz-Josef Weber	1'16:14.92	10	1'26:14.92	37
20 km	Alfred Eder	1'14:42.52	8	1'22:42.52	21

^{1} One minute added per close miss (a hit in the outer ring), two minutes added per complete miss.

Men's 4 x 7.5 km relay

Athletes	Race		
Athletes	Misses ^{2}	Time	Rank
Franz-Josef Weber; Alfred Eder; Klaus Farbmacher; Josef Hones	11	2'18:06.78	15

^{2} A penalty loop of 200 metres had to be skied per missed target.

== Bobsleigh ==
Sled	Athletes	Event	Run 1		Run 2		Run 3		Run 4		Total	
Sled	Athletes	Event	Time	Rank	Time	Rank	Time	Rank	Time	Rank	Time	Rank
AUT-1	Dieter Delle Karth; Franz Köfel	Two-man	56.52	6	56.76	7	56.47	4	56.62	5	3:46.37	6
AUT-2	Fritz Sperling; Andreas Schwab	Two-man	56.06	1	56.19	2	56.73	6	56.76	7	3:45.74	4

Sled	Athletes	Event	Run 1		Run 2		Run 3		Run 4		Total	
Sled	Athletes	Event	Time	Rank	Time	Rank	Time	Rank	Time	Rank	Time	Rank
AUT-1	Fritz Sperling; Kurt Oberhöller; Gerd Zaunschirm; Dieter Gehmacher	Four-man	55.51	8	55.62	8	56.05	6	56.61	5	3:43.79	7
AUT-2	Werner Delle Karth; Andreas Schwab; Heinz Krenn; Otto Breg; Franz Köfel	Four-man	54.66	2	55.80	10	56.10	7	56.65	6	3:43.21	6

== Cross-country skiing ==
Men

Event	Athlete	Race	
Event	Athlete	Time	Rank
15 km	Josef Vogel	48:42.32	48
15 km	Werner Vogel	48:17.47	43
15 km	Rudolf Horn	48:10.52	42
15 km	Herbert Wachter	46:46.39	19
30 km	Franz Gattermann	1'43:04.88	58
30 km	Werner Vogel	1'40:16.10	51
30 km	Reinhold Feichter	1'37:43.73	39
30 km	Herbert Wachter	1'36:28.48	32
50 km	Heinrich Wallner	3'03:58.19	43
50 km	Reinhold Feichter	2'50:53.00	35
50 km	Werner Vogel	2'47:05.63	26
50 km	Herbert Wachter	2'46:40.25	24

Men's 4 × 10 km relay

Athletes	Race	
Athletes	Time	Rank
Rudolf Horn; Reinhold Feichter; Werner Vogel; Herbert Wachter	2'12:22.80	8

Women

Event	Athlete	Race	
Event	Athlete	Time	Rank
5 km	Sylvia Schweiger	20:17.43	42
5 km	Gertrud Gasteiger	20:14.94	41
5 km	Barbara Stöckl	18:49.16	38
10 km	Gertrud Gasteiger	37:35.77	44
10 km	Sylvia Schweiger	36:32.93	41
10 km	Barbara Stöckl	35:28.99	40

== Figure skating ==
Men

Athlete	CF	SP	FS	Points	Places	Rank
Ronald Koppelent	15	–	–	–	DNF	–

Women

Athlete	CF	SP	FS	Points	Places	Rank
Claudia Kristofics-Binder	15	18	16	162.88	149	16

Pairs

Athletes	SP	FS	Points	Places	Rank
Ursula Nemec; Michael Nemec	12	10	121.30	96	10

Ice Dancing

Athletes	CD	FD	Points	Places	Rank
Susanne Handschmann; Peter Handschmann	12	–	–	DNF	–

== Ice hockey ==
=== First round ===
Winners (in bold) entered the Medal Round. Other teams played a consolation round for 7th-12th places.

Team 1	Score	Team 2
**Soviet Union**	16–3	Austria

=== Consolation Round ===
Rank		Pld	W	L	T	GF	GA	Pts
7	Romania	5	4	1	0	23	15	8
8	Austria	5	3	2	0	18	14	6
9	Japan	5	3	2	0	20	18	6
10	Yugoslavia	5	3	2	0	22	19	6
11	Switzerland	5	2	3	0	24	22	4
12	Bulgaria	5	0	5	0	19	38	0

- Austria 6-2 Bulgaria
- Austria 3-2 Japan
- Austria 3-4 Romania
- Austria 3-5 Switzerland
- Austria 3-1 Yugoslavia

**Contestants**; Daniel Gritsch; Franz Schilcher; Walter Schneider; Gerhard Hausner; Johann Schuller; Michael Herzog; Günter Oberhuber; Othmar Russ; Max Moser; Rudolf König; Sepp Puschnig; Franz Voves; Josef Schwitzer; Peter Zini; Sepp Kriechbaum; Alexander Sadjina; Herbert Pöck; Herbert Mörtl

== Luge ==
Men

Athlete	Run 1		Run 2		Run 3		Run 4		Total	
Athlete	Time	Rank	Time	Rank	Time	Rank	Time	Rank	Time	Rank
Reinhold Sulzbacher	53.137	10	52.491	7	52.204	6	52.566	8	3:30.398	7
Manfred Schmid	52.973	8	52.073	3	52.113	5	52.352	6	3:29.511	5
Rudolf Schmid	52.933	7	53.806	15	52.361	8	52.319	5	3:31.419	9

(Men's) Doubles

Athletes	Run 1		Run 2		Total	
Athletes	Time	Rank	Time	Rank	Time	Rank
Rudolf Schmid; Franz Schachner	42.997	3	42.922	2	1:25.919	3rd place, bronze medalist(s)
Manfred Schmid; Reinhold Sulzbacher	43.035	4	43.389	6	1:26.424	5

Women

Athlete	Run 1		Run 2		Run 3		Run 4		Total	
Athlete	Time	Rank	Time	Rank	Time	Rank	Time	Rank	Time	Rank
Angelika Schafferer	43.444	8	43.007	9	42.793	8	43.078	9	2:52.322	8
Margit Graf	43.094	6	42.790	5	42.555	4	43.020	8	2:51.459	6
Antonia Mayr	42.949	4	42.812	6	42.633	5	42.966	6	2:51.360	5

== Nordic combined ==
Events:

- normal hill ski jumping (Three jumps, best two counted and shown here.)
- 15 km cross-country skiing

Athlete	Event	Ski Jumping				Cross-country			Total	
Athlete	Event	Distance 1	Distance 2	Points	Rank	Time	Points	Rank	Points	Rank
Fritz Koch	Individual	72.0	72.0	189.1	22	53:04.73	174.52	28	363.62	26

== Ski jumping ==
Athlete	Event	Jump 1		Jump 2		Total	
Athlete	Event	Distance	Points	Distance	Points	Points	Rank
Toni Innauer	Normal hill	80.5	115.6	81.0	117.9	233.5	7
Rudi Wanner	Normal hill	79.5	116.5	79.5	117.0	233.5	7
Reinhold Bachler	Normal hill	80.5	118.1	80.5	119.1	237.2	6
Karl Schnabl	Normal hill	82.5	121.8	81.5	120.2	242.0	3rd place, bronze medalist(s)
Hans Wallner	Large hill	93.5	109.4	92.5	107.5	216.9	6
Reinhold Bachler	Large hill	95.0	111.5	91.0	105.9	217.4	5
Karl Schnabl	Large hill	97.5	117.5	97.0	117.3	234.8	1st place, gold medalist(s)
Toni Innauer	Large hill	102.5	126.5	91.0	106.4	232.9	2nd place, silver medalist(s)

== Speed skating ==
Men

Event	Athlete	Race	
Event	Athlete	Time	Rank
500 m	Heinz Steinberger	43.28	27
500 m	Berend Schabus	42.33	26
1000 m	Berend Schabus	1:26.50	25
1500 m	Berend Schabus	2:15.41	29
1500 m	Ludwig Kronfuß	2:11.17	26
5000 m	Hubert Gundolf	8:29.34	29
5000 m	Ludwig Kronfuß	8:19.72	27
10,000 m	Hubert Gundolf	17:52.43	20
