= Sweden at the 1976 Winter Olympics =

- IOC code: SWE
- NOC: Swedish Olympic Committee
- Website: www.sok.se (in Swedish and English)

in Innsbruck
- Competitors: 39 (30 men, 9 women) in 7 sports
- Flag bearer: Carl-Erik Eriksson (Bobsleigh)
- Medals Ranked 14th: Gold 0 Silver 0 Bronze 2 Total 2

Winter Olympics appearances (overview)
- 1924; 1928; 1932; 1936; 1948; 1952; 1956; 1960; 1964; 1968; 1972; 1976; 1980; 1984; 1988; 1992; 1994; 1998; 2002; 2006; 2010; 2014; 2018; 2022; 2026

Sweden competed at the 1976 Winter Olympics in Innsbruck, Austria.

== Medalists ==
Medal	Name	Sport	Event
Bronze	Ingemar Stenmark	Alpine skiing	Men's giant slalom
Bronze	Benny Södergren	Cross-country skiing	Men's 50 km

== Alpine skiing ==
Men

Athlete	Event	Race 1		Race 2		Total	
Athlete	Event	Time	Rank	Time	Rank	Time	Rank
Gudmund Söderin	Giant Slalom	1:50.94	33	DNF	–	DNF	–
Stig Strand	Giant Slalom	1:48.63	22	1:45.03	10	3:33.66	12
Torsten Jakobsson	Giant Slalom	1:48.26	17	DNF	–	DNF	–
Ingemar Stenmark	Giant Slalom	1:46.51	8	1:40.90	1	3:27.41	3rd place, bronze medalist(s)
Gudmund Söderin	Slalom	1:05.60	25	DNF	–	DNF	–
Torsten Jakobsson	Slalom	1:04.21	21	1:07.03	18	2:11.24	17
Stig Strand	Slalom	1:03.27	16	1:05.81	9	2:09.08	12
Ingemar Stenmark	Slalom	1:02.34	9	DNF	–	DNF	–

== Biathlon ==
Men

Event	Athlete	Time	Penalties	Adjusted time ^{1}	Rank
20 km	Torsten Wadman	1'15:20.34	15	1'30:20.34	48
20 km	Lars-Göran Arwidson	1'13:34.37	5	1'18:34.37	10
20 km	Sune Adolfsson	1'16:00.50	2	1'18:00.50	8

^{1} One minute added per close miss (a hit in the outer ring), two minutes added per complete miss.

Men's 4 x 7.5 km relay

Athletes	Race		
Athletes	Misses ^{2}	Time	Rank
Mats-Åke Lantz; Torsten Wadman; Sune Adolfsson; Lars-Göran Arwidson	8	2'08:46.90	8

^{2} A penalty loop of 200 metres had to be skied per missed target.

== Bobsleigh ==
Sled	Athletes	Event	Run 1		Run 2		Run 3		Run 4		Total	
Sled	Athletes	Event	Time	Rank	Time	Rank	Time	Rank	Time	Rank	Time	Rank
SWE-1	Carl-Erik Eriksson; Kenth Rönn	Two-man	57.09	10	57.20	9	57.16	9	56.96	8	3:48.41	9

Sled	Athletes	Event	Run 1		Run 2		Run 3		Run 4		Total	
Sled	Athletes	Event	Time	Rank	Time	Rank	Time	Rank	Time	Rank	Time	Rank
SWE-1	Carl-Erik Eriksson; Jan Johansson; Leif Johansson; Kenth Rönn	Four-man	56.12	17	56.48	16	56.87	13	57.65	16	3:47.12	16

== Cross-country skiing ==
Men

Event	Athlete	Race	
Event	Athlete	Time	Rank
15 km	Sven-Åke Lundbäck	47:12.85	30
15 km	Tommy Limby	47:00.06	23
15 km	Thomas Wassberg	46:13.35	15
15 km	Benny Södergren	45:59.91	13
30 km	Sven-Åke Lundbäck	1'36:40.86	35
30 km	Christer Johansson	1'35:23.27	21
30 km	Tommy Limby	1'34:32.47	15
30 km	Benny Södergren	1'33:10.98	12
50 km	Matti Kuosku	2'45:33.41	19
50 km	Sven-Åke Lundbäck	2'45:04.82	16
50 km	Tommy Limby	2'42:43.58	8
50 km	Benny Södergren	2'39:39.21	3rd place, bronze medalist(s)

Men's 4 × 10 km relay

Athletes	Race	
Athletes	Time	Rank
Benny Södergren; Christer Johansson; Thomas Wassberg; Sven-Åke Lundbäck	2'11:16.88	4

Women

Event	Athlete	Race	
Event	Athlete	Time	Rank
5 km	Maria Rautio	17:59.25	32
5 km	Görel Partapuoli	17:20.34	22
5 km	Lena Carlzon	16:54.59	14
5 km	Eva Olsson	16:27.15	5
10 km	Marie Johansson	32:33.18	21
10 km	Görel Partapuoli	32:04.63	16
10 km	Lena Carlzon	31:33.06	10
10 km	Eva Olsson	31:08.72	5

Women's 4 × 5 km relay

Athletes	Race	
Athletes	Time	Rank
Lena Carlzon; Görel Partapuoli; Marie Johansson; Eva Olsson	1'10:14.68	4

== Luge ==
Men

Athlete	Run 1		Run 2		Run 3		Run 4		Total	
Athlete	Time	Rank	Time	Rank	Time	Rank	Time	Rank	Time	Rank
Nils Vinberg	54.916	24	54.494	23	54.640	26	54.429	23	3:38.479	21
Michael Gårdebäck	54.662	22	53.887	18	53.701	20	53.898	18	3:36.148	17
Stefan Kjernholm	54.382	18	53.495	12	53.502	18	53.611	15	3:34.990	15

(Men's) Doubles

Athletes	Run 1		Run 2		Total	
Athletes	Time	Rank	Time	Rank	Time	Rank
Michael Gårdebäck; Nils Vinberg	44.958	17	44.259	13	1:29.217	14

Women

Athlete	Run 1		Run 2		Run 3		Run 4		Total	
Athlete	Time	Rank	Time	Rank	Time	Rank	Time	Rank	Time	Rank
Agneta Lindskog	46.050	23	44.581	14	44.771	17	44.541	15	2:59.943	18
Veronica Holmsten	44.751	15	44.635	15	44.456	15	44.766	16	2:58.608	15

== Ski jumping ==
Athlete	Event	Jump 1		Jump 2		Total	
Athlete	Event	Distance	Points	Distance	Points	Points	Rank
Odd Brandsegg	Normal hill	74.0	99.2	76.0	105.4	204.6	41
Thomas Lundgren	Normal hill	74.0	100.7	70.0	87.3	188.0	51
Odd Brandsegg	Large hill	88.5	96.9	80.0	84.5	181.4	25

== Speed skating ==
Men

Event	Athlete	Race	
Event	Athlete	Time	Rank
500 m	Johan Granath	40.25	13
500 m	Oloph Granath	39.93	9
500 m	Mats Wallberg	39.56	4
1000 m	Bernt Jansson	1:30.27	31
1000 m	Johan Granath	1:22.63	13
1000 m	Mats Wallberg	1:21.27	7
1500 m	Mats Wallberg	2:08.72	22
1500 m	Lennart Carlsson	2:04.76	17
1500 m	Dan Johansson	2:04.73	16
5000 m	Dan Johansson	8:12.37	25
5000 m	Lennart Carlsson	7:53.02	16
5000 m	Örjan Sandler	7:39.69	8
10,000 m	Lennart Carlsson	15:53.89	13
10,000 m	Örjan Sandler	15:16.21	5

Women

Event	Athlete	Race	
Event	Athlete	Time	Rank
500 m	Sylvia Filipsson	45.97	22
500 m	Ann-Sofie Järnström	44.49	13
1000 m	Ann-Sofie Järnström	1:32.06	14
1500 m	Sylvia Filipsson	2:22.42	14
3000 m	Sylvia Filipsson	4:48.15	6

== See also ==
- Sweden at the 1976 Winter Paralympics
