= Rudolf Horn =

Austrian biathlete and cross-country skier

Rudolf Horn (born 8 February 1954) is a former Austrian biathlete and cross-country skier. He competed at the 1976 Winter Olympics, the 1980 Winter Olympics and the 1984 Winter Olympics.

== Olympic results ==
=== Cross-country skiing ===
- 1976:
  - 8th, Winter Olympics 4 × 10 kilometres relay (together with Reinhold Feichter, Werner Vogel and Herbert Wachter)
  - 42nd, Winter Olympics 15 kilometres

=== Biathlon ===
- 1980:
  - 6th, Winter Olympics 4 × 7.5 kilometres relay (together with Alfred Eder, Franz-Josef Weber and Josef Koll)
  - 26th, Winter Olympics 20 kilometres
  - 28th, Winter Olympics 10 kilometres
- 1984:
  - 8th, Winter Olympics 4 × 7.5 kilometres relay (together with Alfred Eder, Walter Hörl and Franz Schuler)
  - 36th, Winter Olympics 20 kilometres
  - 36th, Winter Olympics 10 kilometres
