= Esther Miller =

Canadian cross-country skier (born 1957)

Personal information
- Nationality: Canada
- Born: September 10, 1957 (age 68)

Sport
- Sport: Skiing

World Cup career
- Seasons: 1 – (1982)
- Indiv. starts: 2
- Indiv. podiums: 0
- Team starts: 0
- Team podiums: 0
- Overall titles: 0 – (54th in 1982)

Esther Miller (born 10 September 1957) is a Canadian former cross-country skier who competed in the 1976 Winter Olympics and in the 1980 Winter Olympics.

== Cross-country skiing results ==
All results are sourced from the International Ski Federation (FIS).

=== Olympic Games ===
Year	Age	5 km	10 km	4 × 5 km relay
1976	18	34	—	—
1980	22	—	33	8

=== World Championships ===
Year	Age	5 km	10 km	20 km	4 × 5 km relay
1978	20	31	28	24	9

=== World Cup ===
==== Season standings ====
Season	Age	Overall
1982	24	54
