= Liisa Suihkonen =

Finnish cross-country skier (1943-2025)

Personal information
- Nationality: Finland
- Born: 27 September 1943 Suonenjoki, Finland
- Died: 29 August 2025 (aged 81)

Sport
- Sport: Skiing
- Club: Suonenjoki Vasamaa
Medal record
Women's cross-country skiing
Representing Finland
Olympic Games
Silver medal – second place	1976 Innsbruck	4 × 5 km relay

Liisa Suihkonen (27 September 1943 – 29 August 2025) was a Finnish cross-country skier who competed during the 1970s.

== Biography ==
Suihkonen was born in Suonenjoki, Northern Savonia on 27 September 1943.

She won a silver medal in the 4 × 5 km relay at the 1976 Winter Olympics of Innsbruck.

Suihkonen died 29 August 2025, at the age of 81.

== Cross-country skiing results ==
=== Olympic Games ===
- 1 medal – (1 silver)

Year	Age	5 km	10 km	3/4 × 5 km relay
1968	25	—	18	—
1976	33	—	—	Silver

=== World Championships ===
Year	Age	5 km	10 km	4 × 5 km relay
1974	31	—	—	4
