= Taina Impiö =

Finnish cross-country skier

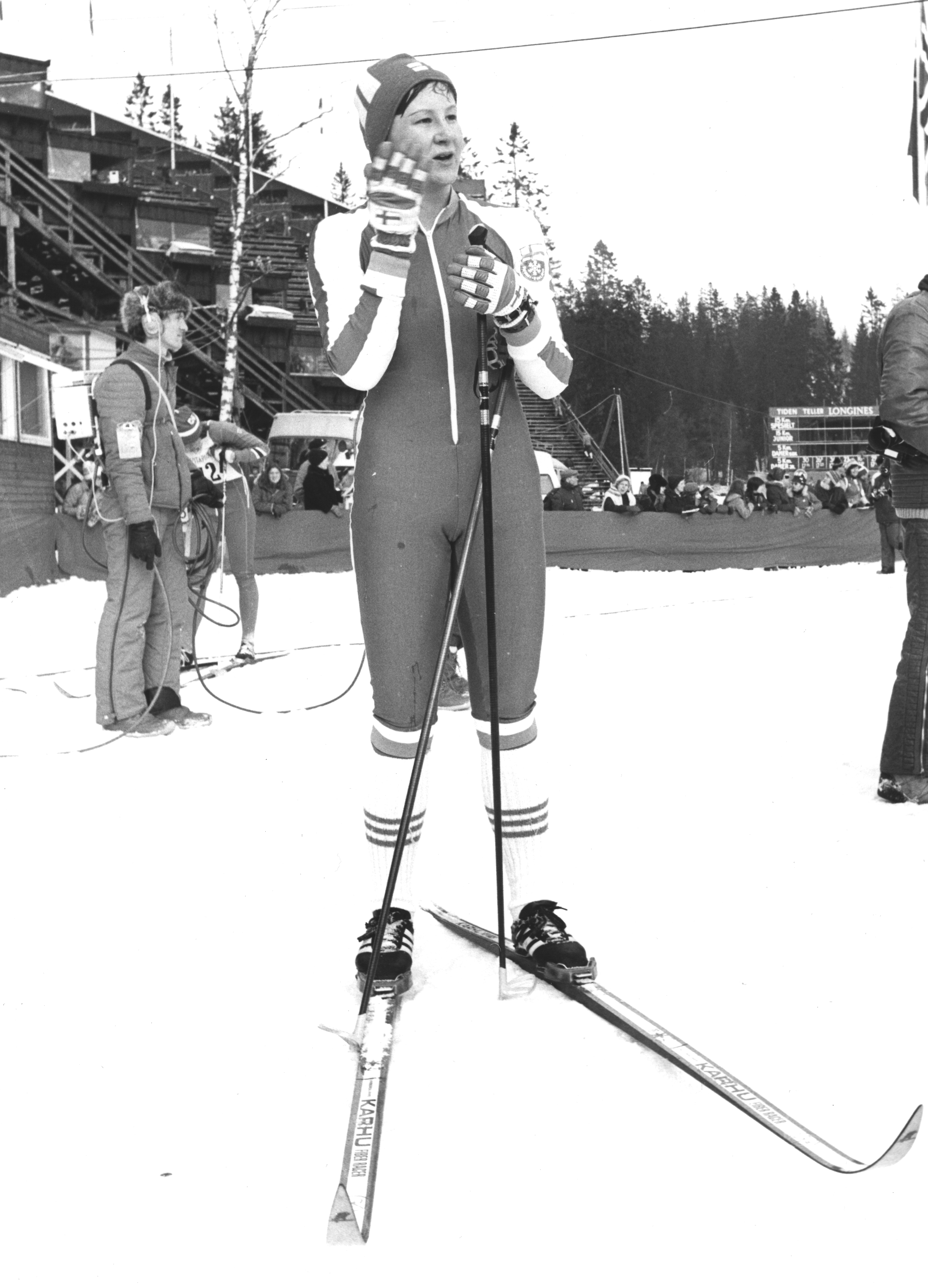
- Taina Impiö in March 1976

Personal information
- Born: 10 April 1956 (age 70) Ranua, Finland

Sport
- Sport: Cross-country skiing
- Club: Ranuan Peura
Medal record
Women's cross-country skiing
Representing Finland
World Championships
Gold medal – first place	1978 Lahti	4 × 5 km relay

Taina Itkonen (born Taina Impiö on 10 April 1956) is a Finnish former cross-country skier who competed during the late 1970s. She won a gold medal in the 4 × 5 km relay at the 1978 FIS Nordic World Ski Championships in Lahti, and finished fifth in the 10 km event at those same championships. She also competed in the women's 5 kilometres at the 1976 Winter Olympics.

Now she works as a PE teacher in Sodankylä.

== Cross-country skiing results ==
=== Olympic Games ===
Year	Age	5 km	10 km	4 × 5 km relay
1976	19	19	—	—

=== World Championships ===
- 1 medal – (1 gold)

Year	Age	5 km	10 km	20 kmv	4 × 5 km relay
1978	21	9	5	13	Gold
