= Milena Kordež =

Slovenian cross-country skier

Personal information
- Nationality: Slovenian
- Born: 10 September 1953 (age 72) Kranj, Yugoslavia

Sport
- Sport: Cross-country skiing

Milena Kordež (born 10 September 1953) is a Slovenian cross-country skier. She competed in two events at the 1976 Winter Olympics, representing Yugoslavia.

== Cross-country skiing results ==
=== Olympic Games ===
Year	Age	5 km	10 km	4 × 5 km relay
1976	22	37	39	—

=== World Championships ===
Year	Age	5 km	10 km	20 km	4 × 5 km relay
1978	24	—	41	—	—
