= Rautio (disambiguation) =

Rautio is a village in Finland. The term may also refer to:

- Rautio (surname)

== See also ==
- Rautio Nunatak
