= Sigrun Krause =

East German cross-country skier

Personal information
- Born: 28 January 1954 (age 72) Steinbach, East Germany

Sport
- Sport: Skiing
- Club: ASK Vorwärts Oberhof
Medal record
Women's cross-country skiing
Representing East Germany
Olympic Games
Bronze medal – third place	1976 Innsbruck	4 × 5 km relay
World Championships
Silver medal – second place	1974 Falun	4 × 5 km relay

Sigrun Krause (later Filbrich, born 28 January 1954) is a retired East German cross-country skier who competed during the 1970s. She won a bronze medal in the 4 × 5 km relay at the 1976 Winter Olympics in Innsbruck.

Krause also won a silver in the 4 × 5 km relay at the 1974 FIS Nordic World Ski Championships in Falun.

She is married to former cross-country skier, coach and sports official Wolfgang Filbrich, and is the mother of cross-country skier Jens Filbrich.

== Cross-country skiing results ==
=== Olympic Games ===
- 1 medal – (1 bronze)

Year	Age	5 km	10 km	4 × 5 km relay
1976	22	16	12	Bronze

=== World Championships ===
- 1 medal – (1 silver)

Year	Age	5 km	10 km	20 km	4 × 5 km relay
1974	20	—	—	—N/a	Silver
1978	24	—	19	21	—
