= Terry Porter (cross-country skier) =

American skier (born 1953)

Personal information
- Nationality: American
- Born: September 12, 1953 (age 72) Cambridge, Massachusetts, United States

Sport
- Sport: Cross-country skiing

Terry Porter (born September 12, 1953) is an American cross-country skier. She competed in two events at the 1976 Winter Olympics.

== Cross-country skiing results ==
=== Olympic Games ===
Year	Age	5 km	10 km	4 × 5 km relay
1976	22	39	—	9
