= Alena Bartošová =

Czech cross-country skier

Medal record

Women's cross-country skiing

Representing Czechoslovakia

World Championships
Bronze medal – third place	1974 Falun	4 × 5 km relay

Alena Bartošová (born 17 September 1944) is a Czech former cross-country skier who competed for Czechoslovakia during the 1970s. She won a bronze medal in the 4 × 5 km relay at the 1974 FIS Nordic World Ski Championships in Falun.

She was born in Pipice. Her best olympic placing was sixth twice in the 4 × 5 km relay events at the 1972 Winter Olympics and in the 1976 Winter Olympics in Innsbruck.

== Cross-country skiing results ==
=== Olympic Games ===
Year	Age	5 km	10 km	3/4 × 5 km relay
1972	27	16	27	6
1976	31	—	35	6

=== World Championships ===
- 1 medal – (1 bronze)

Year	Age	5 km	10 km	4 × 5 km relay
1974	29	—	—	Bronze
