= Kummen =

Kummen may refer to:

- Grete Kummen, a Norwegian cross-country skier
- Kummen (Ferden), an alpine settlement in the municipality of Ferden in the Swiss canton of Valais
