= Cross-country skiing at the 1976 Winter Olympics – Women's 5 kilometre =

Olympic skiing event

Women's 5km at the XII Olympic Winter Games
- Cross-country skiing
- Venue: Cross Country Skiing Stadium
- Date: 7 February 1976
- Competitors: 44 from 14 nations
- Winning time: 15:48.69

Medalists
1st place, gold medalist(s)		Helena Takalo; Finland
2nd place, silver medalist(s)		Raisa Smetanina; Soviet Union
3rd place, bronze medalist(s)		Nina Baldycheva; Soviet Union

The Women's 5 kilometre cross-country skiing event was part of the cross-country skiing programme at the 1976 Winter Olympics, in Innsbruck, Austria. It was the fourth appearance of the event. The competition was held on 7 February 1976, at the Cross Country Skiing Stadium.

== Results ==
Rank	Name	Country	Time
1	Helena Takalo	Finland	15:48.69
2	Raisa Smetanina	Soviet Union	15:49.73
3	Nina Baldycheva	Soviet Union	16:12.82
4	Hilkka Kuntola	Finland	16:17.74
5	Eva Olsson	Sweden	16:27.15
6	Zinaida Amosova	Soviet Union	16:33.78
7	Monika Debertshäuser	East Germany	16:34.94
8	Grete Kummen	Norway	16:35.43
9	Marjatta Kajosmaa	Finland	16:36.25
10	Blanka Paulů	Czechoslovakia	16:41.65
11	Barbara Petzold	East Germany	16:42.44
12	Veronika Hesse-Schmidt	East Germany	16:42.86
13	Gabriela Svobodová-Sekajová	Czechoslovakia	16:53.22
14	Lena Carlzon-Lundbäck	Sweden	16:54.59
15	Anna Pasiarová	Czechoslovakia	16:54.98
16	Sigrun Krause	East Germany	16:55.54
17	Berit Kvello	Norway	16:57.12
18	Marit Myrmæl	Norway	17:02.21
19	Taina Impiö	Finland	17:03.30
20	Berit Johannessen	Norway	17:04.25
21	Michaela Endler	West Germany	17:08.68
22	Görel Partapuoli	Sweden	17:20.34
23	Miroslava Jaškovská	Czechoslovakia	17:26.48
24	Władysława Majerczyk	Poland	17:29.01
25	Anna Pawlusiak	Poland	17:29.61
26	Mikiko Terui	Japan	17:29.65
27	Shirley Firth	Canada	17:31.36
28	Martha Rockwell	United States	17:33.07
29	Sharon Firth	Canada	17:35.06
30	Joan Groothuysen	Canada	17:51.08
31	Anna Gębala-Duraj	Poland	17:58.91
32	Maria Rautio	Sweden	17:59.25
33	Iris Schulze	West Germany	18:04.81
34	Esther Miller	Canada	18:05.05
35	Jana Hlavaty	United States	18:21.21
36	Maria Trebunia	Poland	18:21.64
37	Milena Kordež	Yugoslavia	18:36.23
38	Barbara Stöckl	Austria	18:49.16
39	Terry Porter	United States	19:36.93
40	Claudia Sprenger	Liechtenstein	19:51.66
41	Gertrud Gasteiger	Austria	20:14.94
42	Sylvia Schweiger	Austria	20:17.43
	Lynn von der Heide-Spencer-Galanes	United States	DNF
	Galina Kulakova	Soviet Union	(16:07.36) DQ (Doping)
