= Sue Holloway =

Canadian retired cross-country skier and sprint canoeist

Personal information
- Born: May 19, 1955 (age 71) Halifax, Nova Scotia
- Education: Simon Fraser University

Sport
- Country: Canada
- Sport: Cross-country skiing Canoe sprint
Medal record
Women's canoe sprint
Silver medal – second place	1984 Los Angeles	K-2 500 m
Bronze medal – third place	1984 Los Angeles	K-4 500 m

Susan Holloway (born May 19, 1955) is a Canadian retired cross-country skier and sprint canoeist. In 1976, Holloway became the first woman and first Canadian to compete in both the Summer and Winter Olympic Games in the same year, competing in cross-country skiing at the winter games in Innsbruck and in canoe sprint at the summer games in Montreal.

== Life and career ==
Susan Holloway was born in Halifax, Nova Scotia. Her family moved to Ottawa when she was 3. She graduated from Brookfield High School in 1973. She later attended Simon Fraser University in Vancouver where she competed in their swim team and earned a physical education degree in 1983.

In cross-country skiing at the 1976 Winter Games in Innsbruck, she finished 32nd in the 10 km and seventh in the 4 × 5 km relay.

Holloway was selected as Canada's flag bearer for the Opening Ceremonies of the 1980 Summer Olympics in Moscow. However, Canada's boycott of those games denied her the opportunity to participate in the Parade of Nations.

Holloway won two medals in canoe sprint at the 1984 Summer Olympics in Los Angeles with a silver in the K-2 500 m and a bronze in the K-4 500 m events.

== Awards and honours ==
Holloway was inducted into the Canadian Olympic Hall of Fame in 1986. In 1988, the Sue Holloway Fitness Park was built at Mooney's Bay Park in Ottawa. The park was demolished in 2018 and relocated in 2019. Sue Holloway received the Order of Sport award from Canada's Sports Hall of Fame in 2016.

== Personal life ==
In 2002, Holloway married Canadian Olympic high jumper Greg Joy. They have two daughters.

== Cross-country skiing results ==
=== Olympic Games ===
Year	Age	5 km	10 km	4 × 5 km relay
1976	20	—	32	7
