= Joan Groothuysen =

Canadian cross-country skier (1957–2018)

Personal information
- Born: September 6, 1957 Ottawa, Ontario, Canada
- Died: May 7, 2018 (aged 60) Edmonton, Alberta, Canada
- Height: 1.67 m (5 ft 6 in)
- Weight: 57 kg (126 lb)

Sport
- Sport: Cross-country skiing
- Club: Inuvik Ski Club/Bonnyville

Joan Elizabeth Groothuysen (September 6, 1957 – May 7, 2018) was a Canadian cross-country skier. She competed at the 1976 and 1980 Winter Olympics in the 5 km and 10 km individual races and 4×5 km relay with the best achievement of seventh place in the relay in 1976. She died of cancer in Edmonton in 2018.

== Cross-country skiing results ==
=== Olympic Games ===
Year	Age	5 km	10 km	4 × 5 km relay
1976	18	30	34	7
1980	22	27	34	8

=== World Championships ===
Year	Age	5 km	10 km	20 km	4 × 5 km relay
1978	20	34	38	—	9
