= Berit Johannessen =

Norwegian cross-country skier

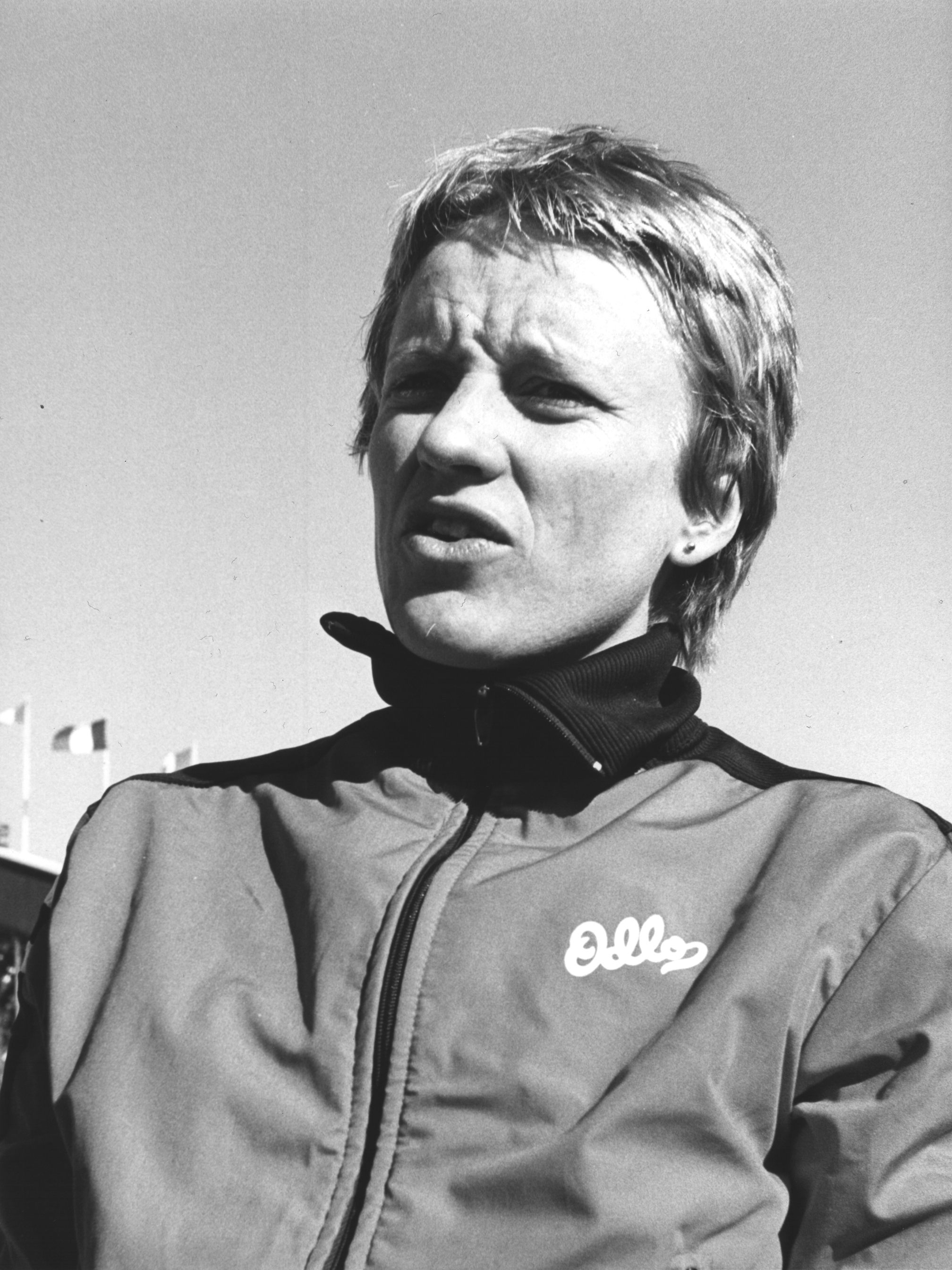
- Johannessen in March, 1978

Personal information
- Nationality: Norwegian
- Born: 17 March 1951 (age 74) Oslo

Sport
- Sport: Cross-country skiing
- Club: Fossum IF

Berit Johannessen (born 17 March 1951) is a Norwegian cross-country skier, born in Oslo. She represented the club Fossum IF. She competed in 5 km, 10 km and the relay at the 1976 Winter Olympics in Innsbruck. She was Norwegian champion in 10 km in 1978.

== Cross-country skiing results ==
=== Olympic Games ===
Year	Age	5 km	10 km	4 × 5 km relay
1976	24	20	23	5

=== World Championships ===
Year	Age	5 km	10 km	20 km	4 × 5 km relay
1974	22	—	27	—N/a	—
1978	26	—	18	11	5
