= Rudolf König (disambiguation) =

Rudolf König (1865–1927) was an Austrian merchant, amateur astronomer and selenographer.

Rudolf König may also refer to:

- Rudolph Koenig (1832–1901), German physicist and instrument maker
- Kasper König (born Rudolf Hans König, 1943–2024), German museum director and curator
- Rudolf König (ice hockey) (born 1957), Austrian ice hockey player
