= Walter Schneider =

Walter Schneider may refer to:

- Walter Schneider (bass), German operatic bass
- Walter Schneider (ice hockey), Austrian ice hockey player
- Walter Schneider (motorcyclist) (1927–2010), German motorcyclist
- Walter Schneider (swimmer), Swiss swimmer
- Walter-Erich Schneider (1909–1987), German military officer
