= Rautio (surname) =

Rautio is a Finnish surname. Notable people with the surname include:

- Karl Rautio (1889–1963), Finnish composer
- Markus Rautio (1891–1973), Finnish radio journalist and presenter
- Valdemar Rautio (1921–1973), Finnish triple jumper
- Martti Rautio (1935–2017), Canadian cross-country skier
- Maria Rautio (born 1957), Swedish cross-country skier
- Nina Rautio (born 1957), Russian operatic soprano
- Kai Rautio (born 1964), Finnish ice hockey player
- David Rautio (born 1985), Swedish ice hockey player
