= Iris Schulze =

German cross-country skier (born 1958)

Personal information
- Nationality: German
- Born: 16 April 1958 (age 67) Bautzen, Bezirk Dresden, East Germany

Sport
- Sport: Cross-country skiing

Iris Schulze (born 16 April 1958) is a German former cross-country skier. She competed in two events at the 1976 Winter Olympics.

== Cross-country skiing results ==
=== Olympic Games ===
Year	Age	5 km	10 km	4 × 5 km relay
1976	17	33	31	—
