= Gertrud Gasteiger =

Austrian cross-country skier (born 1959)

Personal information
- Nationality: Austrian
- Born: 2 November 1959 (age 66) Brixlegg, Austria

Sport
- Sport: Cross-country skiing

Gertrud Gasteiger (born 2 November 1959) is an Austrian cross-country skier. She competed in two events at the 1976 Winter Olympics.

== Cross-country skiing results ==
=== Olympic Games ===
Year	Age	5 km	10 km	4 × 5 km relay
1976	16	41	44	—
