= Maria Trebunia =

Polish cross-country skier

Personal information
- Nationality: Polish
- Born: 3 May 1956 (age 69) Poronin, Poland

Sport
- Sport: Cross-country skiing

Maria Trebunia (born 3 May 1956) is a Polish cross-country skier who competed in three events at the 1976 Winter Olympics.

== Results ==
Year	Age	5 km	10 km	4 × 5 km relay
1976	19	36	33	8
