= Anna Pawlusiak =

Polish cross-country skier

Personal information
- Full name: Anna Pawlusiak-Dobija
- Born: 10 February 1952 (age 73) Wilkowice, Poland
- Height: 174 cm (5 ft 9 in)
- Weight: 65 kg (143 lb)

Sport
- Country: Poland
- Sport: Cross-country skiing

Anna Pawlusiak (married name Dobija, born 10 February 1952) is a Polish cross-country skier. She competed in three events at the 1976 Winter Olympics.

== Cross-country skiing results ==
=== Olympic Games ===
Year	Age	5 km	10 km	4 × 5 km relay
1976	24	25	26	8
