= Martha Rockwell =

American cross-country skier

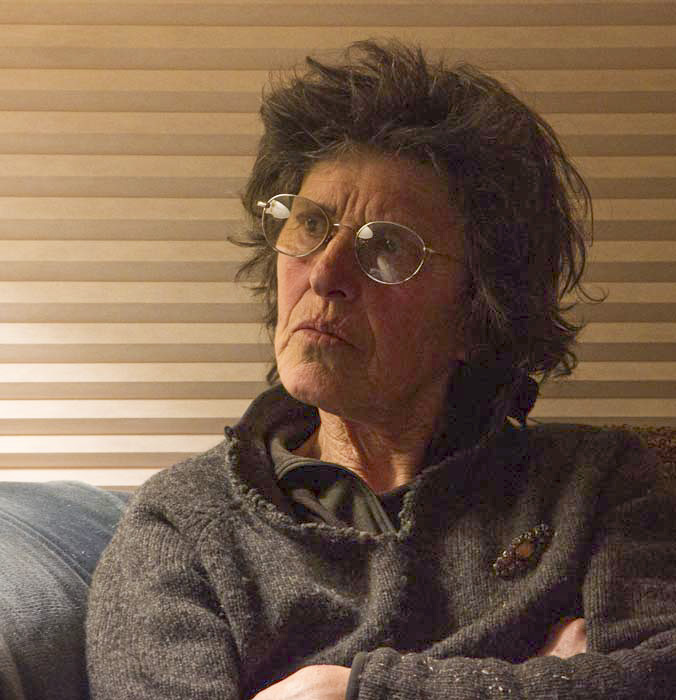
- Rockwell in 2011

Personal information
- Born: April 26, 1944 (age 82) Providence, Rhode Island
- Education: Bennington College
- Years active: 1967–1976

Sport
- Country: United States
- Sport: Cross-country skiing
- Team: U.S. Olympic Team

Martha Rockwell (born April 26, 1944) is a retired American cross-country skier and coach, who competed at the Winter Olympic Games in 1972 and 1976. She has been cited in the U.S. as a "pioneer" and a "legend" in women's cross-country skiing, having been the U.S. women's cross-country ski champion 18 times between 1969 and 1975 as part of the first U.S. national cross-country ski team for women.

== Personal life ==
Rockwell was born on April 26, 1944, in Providence, Rhode Island to Barbara (née Webb) and Henry Benson "Ben" Rockwell. She graduated from The Putney School, where her father was headmaster, and Bennington College. Rockwell raced in Alpine skiing events in high school at Putney and in cross-country races where she raced on the boys' team under coach, John Caldwell. Upon graduation from college, she briefly pursued a graphic arts career in Manhattan prior to starting her career in cross-country ski racing.

Her October 2000 Vermont civil union and other aspects of her life leading up to it were the subject of coverage in The Washington Post. At that time, Rockwell was raising dairy goats in partnership with her sister in Cabot, Vermont.

== Athletic career ==
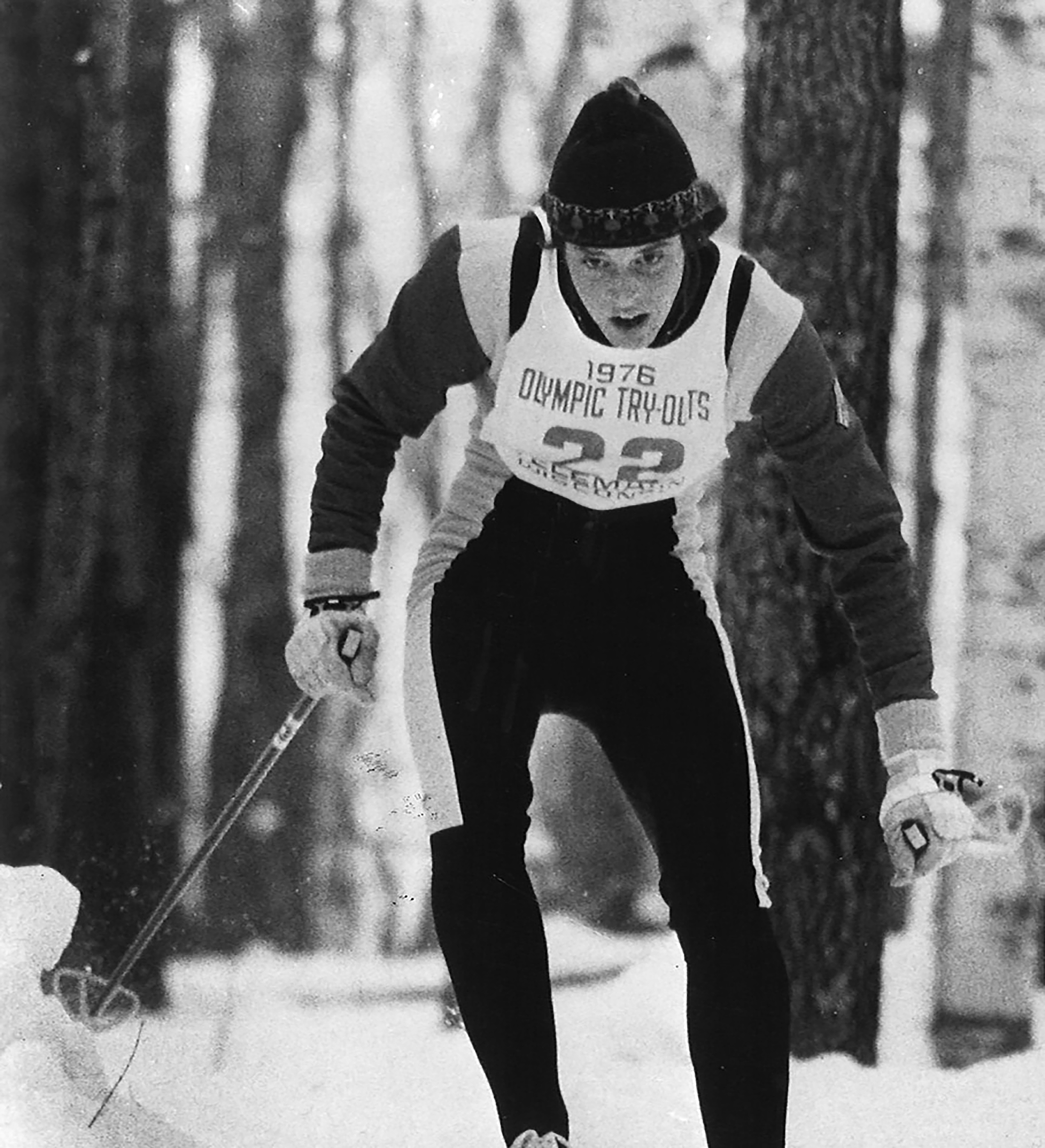
Rockwell during a January 1976 Olympic tryout cross-country ski race in Wisconsin

In her entry with the Vermont Sports Hall of Fame, Rockwell is cited as a "pioneer in the United States in women's cross country skiing".

Soon after the organization of the (then) United States Ski Association women's cross-country ski team in 1969, Rockwell was the first women's national cross-country ski champion. Rockwell and other promising skiers, including Bill Koch, received the attention of coach Marty Hall, who was instrumental in her further development as a skier and her exposure to the international racing circuit. Hall said of Rockwell, "She took our program from zero to Mach 1 in just a couple of years."

She was a member of the USA women's Olympic Nordic ski team in 1972—the first year U.S. women competed in cross-country skiing in the Olympic Winter Games. She raced in the 5K, 10K and Nordic relay events at the 1972 Winter Olympics in Sapporo, Japan. The effectiveness of Rockwell's training regime was evident in a 1974 World Championship race, when she was in sixth place and closing on the leaders within reach of a podium finish and a medal; unfortunately a course worker's ski pole caught Rockwell's, causing a fall and a tenth-place finish—still a strong finish for an American at the time. She also competed at the 1976 Winter Olympics. She won 18 U.S. championships in the period, 1969 through 1975. Rockwell's FIS international racing career included a 1973 win in a 7.5K event at Castelrotto, Italy, followed by five wins in six European races in 1975, making her 10th overall in the FIS Cross-Country World Cup standings.

Rockwell retired from ski racing after her 1976 season. In 1979, Rockwell set the women's record for running the Mount Washington Road Race at 1:19:14, a record which stood until 1985. Rockwell coached the women's cross-country ski team of Dartmouth College from 1979 to 1987.

== Honors ==
Rockwell was designated "U.S. Nordic Skier of the Year" for 1975 and 1976 by Ski Magazine; in its 1995 Skiing for Women issue the same magazine cited Rockwell as a skiing "legend", along with Andrea Mead Lawrence and Maria Bogner. She was inducted into the U.S. Ski Hall of Fame in 1986 and into the Vermont Ski Museum Hall of Fame in 2005. She was inducted into the Vermont Sports Hall of Fame in 2017, along with former coach and cross-country skier, John Caldwell. Sports Illustrated included Rockwell in a glamor photo shoot of six noted skiers in 1970. Dartmouth College established a "Martha Rockwell Award", given annually to a female cross-country skier “who, in the estimation of the coaches, has performed the best throughout the season”.

== Cross-country skiing race finishes ==
=== Olympic Games ===
Year	Age	5 km	10 km	3/4 × 5 km relay
1972	27	18	16	11
1976	31	28	36	9
