= Jana Hlavaty =

Czech-American cross-country skier

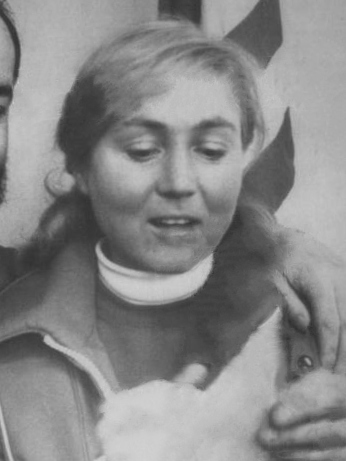
- Hlavaty in 1976, after becoming a US citizen

Personal information
- Born: August 25, 1941 (age 84) Prague, Czechoslovakia

Sport
- Sport: Cross-country skiing

Jana Hlavaty (née Ledvinková on August 25, 1941, in Prague) is a retired cross-country skier.

Born in Czechoslovakia, she earned a master's degree from Charles University in Prague. In August 1969, one year after the Prague Spring, she came to the United States to visit her uncle but never returned as she married Václav Hlavatý, a Czech doctor living in Chicago. She became a member of the U.S. cross-country skiing team in 1973. As she obtained permanent residency in March 1971, she could not become a citizen until five years later, March 1976. However, as the 1976 Winter Olympics were to take place in February, she wouldn't be able to compete for America there. Therefore, she appealed to the Illinois Senator Charles H. Percy who arranged a special bill passed by Congress (and signed by Gerald Ford), waiving the requirement for her, so that she became a citizen in January 1976 and was able to compete at the Winter Olympics afterwards, taking part in the five and ten kilometre events and the 4 × 5 kilometre relay.

In 1978 she became director of cross-country skiing facilities at Keystone Resort in Keystone, Colorado.
