= Margarita Maslennikova =

Soviet cross-country skier (1928–2021)

Medal record

Women's cross-country skiing

Representing Soviet Union

World Championships
Gold medal – first place	1954 Falun	3 × 5 km relay

Margarita Maslennikova (2 November 1928 – 5 March 2021) was a Soviet cross-country skier who competed in the 1950s. She was born in Leningrad. She won a gold medal in the 3 × 5 km relay at the 1954 FIS Nordic World Ski Championships in Falun and finished fourth in the 10 km event at those same championships. She died in Saint Petersburg, aged 92.

== Cross-country skiing results ==
All results are sourced from the International Ski Federation (FIS).

=== World Championships ===
- 1 medal – (1 gold)

Year	Age	10 km	3 × 5 km relay
1954	25	4	Gold
