= Záhoří (Semily District) =

- Municipality
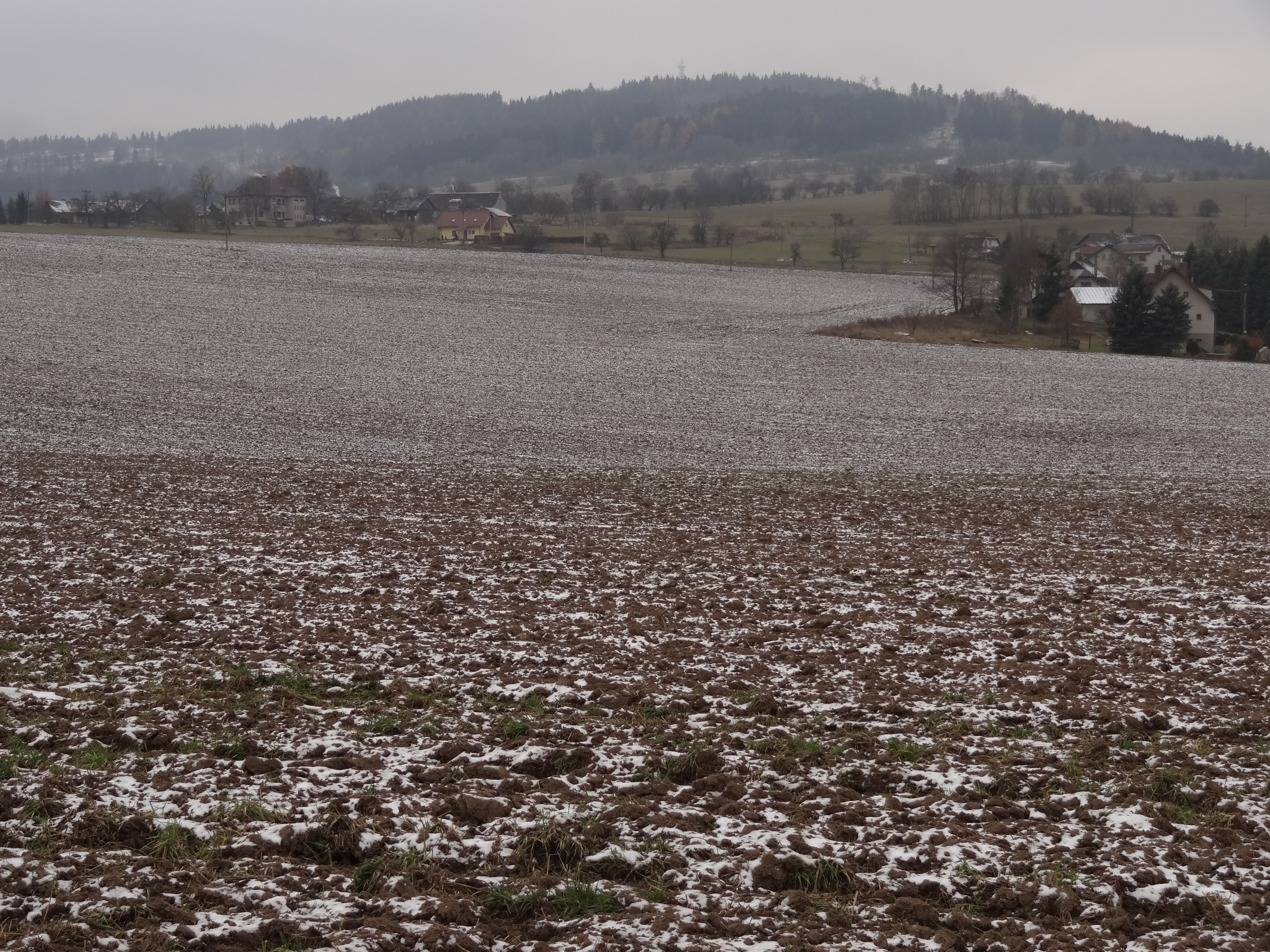
- Villages of Záhoří and Pipice

- Flag Coat of arms

- Location in the Czech Republic
- Coordinates: 50°36′42″N 15°16′27″E
- Country: Czech Republic
- Region: Liberec
- District: Semily
- First mentioned: 1393

Area
  - Total: 8.54 km^{2} (3.30 sq mi)
- Elevation: 501 m (1,644 ft)

Population (2026-01-01)
  - Total: 515
  - Density: 60.3/km^{2} (156/sq mi)
- Time zone: UTC+1 (CET)
  - Summer (DST): UTC+2 (CEST)
- Postal code: 513 01
- Website: www.obeczahori.cz

Záhoří is a municipality and village in Semily District in the Liberec Region of the Czech Republic. It has about 500 inhabitants.

== Administrative division ==
Záhoří consists of five municipal parts (in brackets population according to the 2021 census):

- Záhoří (97)
- Dlouhý (77)
- Pipice (81)
- Proseč (52)
- Smrčí (182)

== Demographics ==
Historical population
Year	Pop.	±%
1869	1,223	—
1880	1,264	+3.4%
1890	1,339	+5.9%
1900	1,226	−8.4%
1910	1,158	−5.5%
1921	1,098	−5.2%
1930	1,162	+5.8%
1950	844	−27.4%
1961	705	−16.5%
1970	651	−7.7%
1980	600	−7.8%
1991	482	−19.7%
2001	487	+1.0%
2011	494	+1.4%
2021	489	−1.0%
Source: Censuses

== Notable people ==
- Alena Bartošová (born 1944), cross-country skier
