= Hilkka Riihivuori =

Finnish cross-country skier (born 1952)

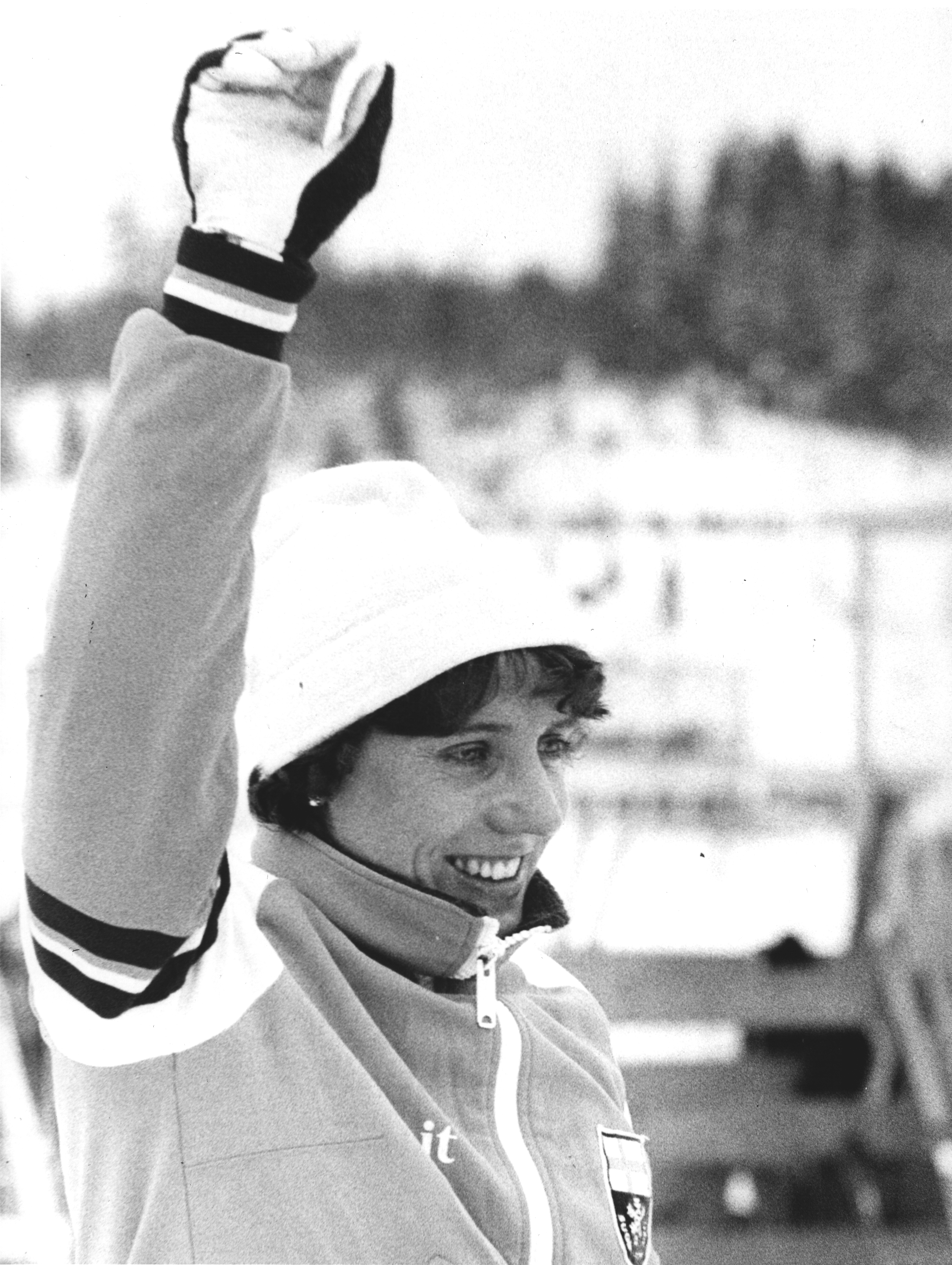
- Hilkka Riihivuori in March, 1980

Personal information
- Nationality: Finland
- Born: 24 December 1952 (age 73) Jurva, Southern Ostrobothnia, Finland

Sport
- Sport: Skiing
- Club: Tampereen Pyrintö

World Cup career
- Seasons: 1 – (1982)
- Indiv. starts: 4
- Indiv. podiums: 3
- Indiv. wins: 0
- Team starts: 1
- Team podiums: 0
- Overall titles: 0 – (12th in 1982)
Medal record
Women's cross-country skiing
Representing Finland
International nordic ski competitions
Event	1st	2nd	3rd
Olympic Games	0	4	0
World Championships	1	3	2
Total	1	7	2
Olympic Games
Silver medal – second place	1972 Sapporo	3 × 5 km relay
Silver medal – second place	1976 Innsbruck	4 × 5 km relay
Silver medal – second place	1980 Lake Placid	5 km
Silver medal – second place	1980 Lake Placid	10 km
World Championships
Gold medal – first place	1978 Lahti	4 × 5 km relay
Silver medal – second place	1978 Lahti	5 km
Silver medal – second place	1982 Oslo	5 km
Silver medal – second place	1982 Oslo	10 km
Bronze medal – third place	1978 Lahti	10 km
Bronze medal – third place	1982 Oslo	20 km

Hilkka Riihivuori (née Kuntola, born 24 December 1952 in Jurva, Southern Ostrobothnia) is a Finnish former cross-country skier who competed during the 1970s and 1980s. She competed in three Winter Olympics, earning a total of four medals (1972 and 1976 under her maiden name and 1980 under her married name.). Riihivuori also competed several times at the Holmenkollen ski festival, winning twice at 10 km (1974, 1980) and once at 5 km (1977).

Riihivuori's biggest success was at the FIS Nordic World Ski Championships, where she won two medals in the 10 km (silver: 1982, bronze: 1978), a gold medal in the 4 × 5 km relay (1978), and two silver medals in the 5 km (1978, 1982).

For her successes in Nordic skiing World Championships and at the Holmenkollen, Kuntola received the Holmenkollen medal in 1977 (Shared with Helena Takalo and Walter Steiner.).

== Cross-country skiing results ==
All results are sourced from the International Ski Federation (FIS).

=== Olympic Games ===
- 4 medals – (4 silver)

Year	Age	5 km	10 km	4 × 5 km relay
1972	19	5	8	Silver
1976	23	4	9	Silver
1980	27	Silver	Silver	5

=== World Championships ===
- 6 medals – (1 gold, 3 silver, 2 bronze)

Year	Age	5 km	10 km	20 km	4 × 5 km relay
1974	21	20	17	—N/a	4
1978	25	Silver	Bronze	4	Gold
1982	29	Silver	Silver	Bronze	4

=== World Cup ===
==== Season standings ====
Season	Age	Overall
1982	29	12

==== Individual podiums ====
- 3 podiums

No.	Season	Date	Location	Race	Level	Place
1	1981–82	19 February 1982	Oslo, Norway	10 km Individual	World Championships^{[1]}	2nd
2	1981–82	22 February 1982	Oslo, Norway	5 km Individual	World Championships^{[1]}	2nd
3	1981–82	26 February 1982	Oslo, Norway	20 km Individual	World Championships^{[1]}	3rd

Note: ^{1} Until the 1999 World Championships, World Championship races were included in the World Cup scoring system.
