= Matthias Buse =

East German ski jumper

Medal record

Representing East Germany

Men's ski jumping

World Championships
Gold medal – first place	1978 Lahti	Individual normal hill
Silver medal – second place	1984 Engelberg	Team large hill

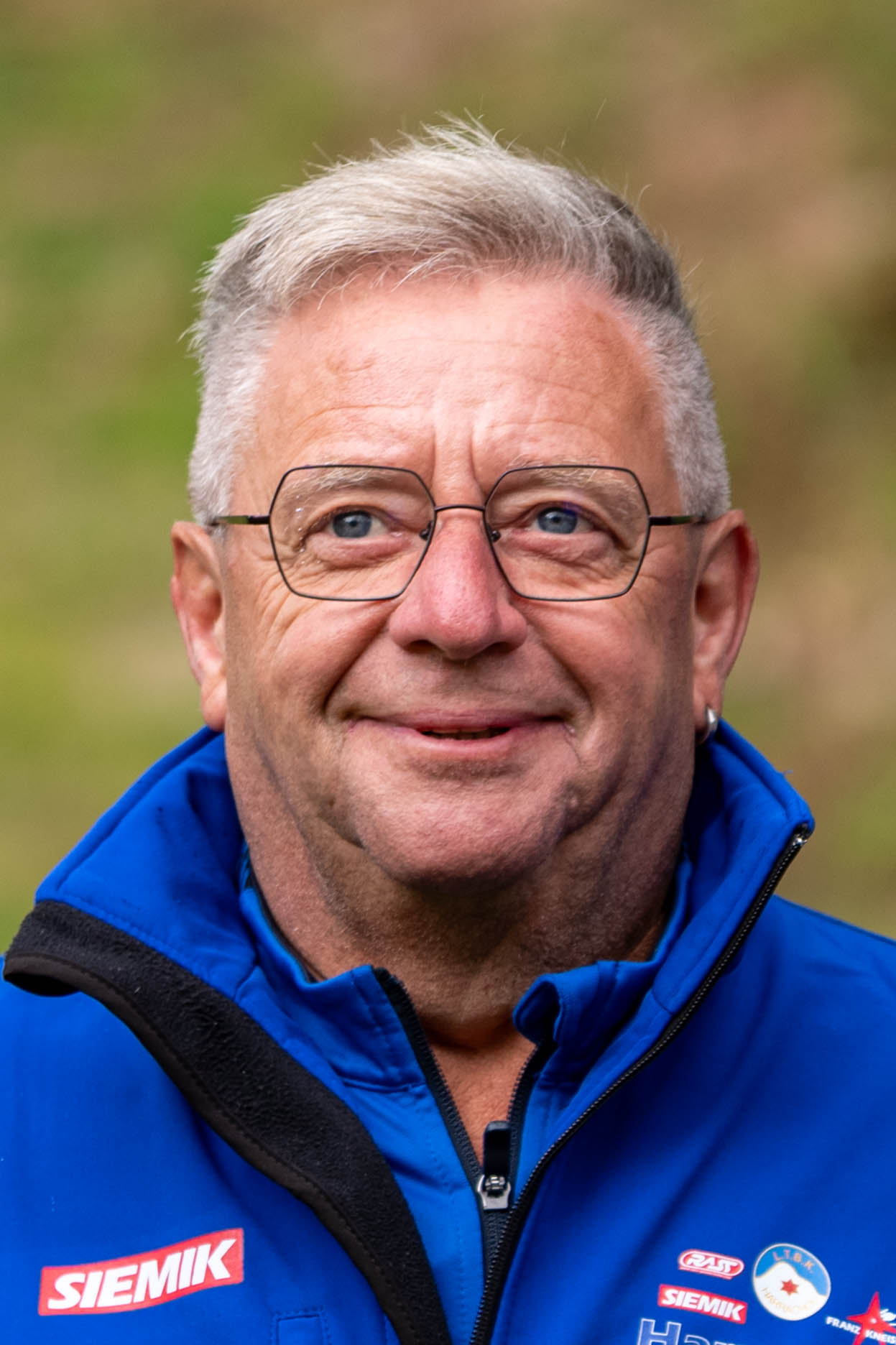
Matthias Buse at the 2025 Legends' Gathering

Matthias Buse (born 3 March 1959) is an East German former ski jumper who competed from 1977 to 1984. He won the individual normal hill event at the 1978 FIS Nordic World Ski Championships in Lahti, then won a silver medal in the team large hill at the 1984 FIS Nordic World Ski Championships in Engelberg.

Buse also won an individual normal hill event at Oberstdorf in 1977. Today he is the vice-president of VSC Klingenthal
