= Helena Takalo =

Finnish cross-country skier (born 1947)

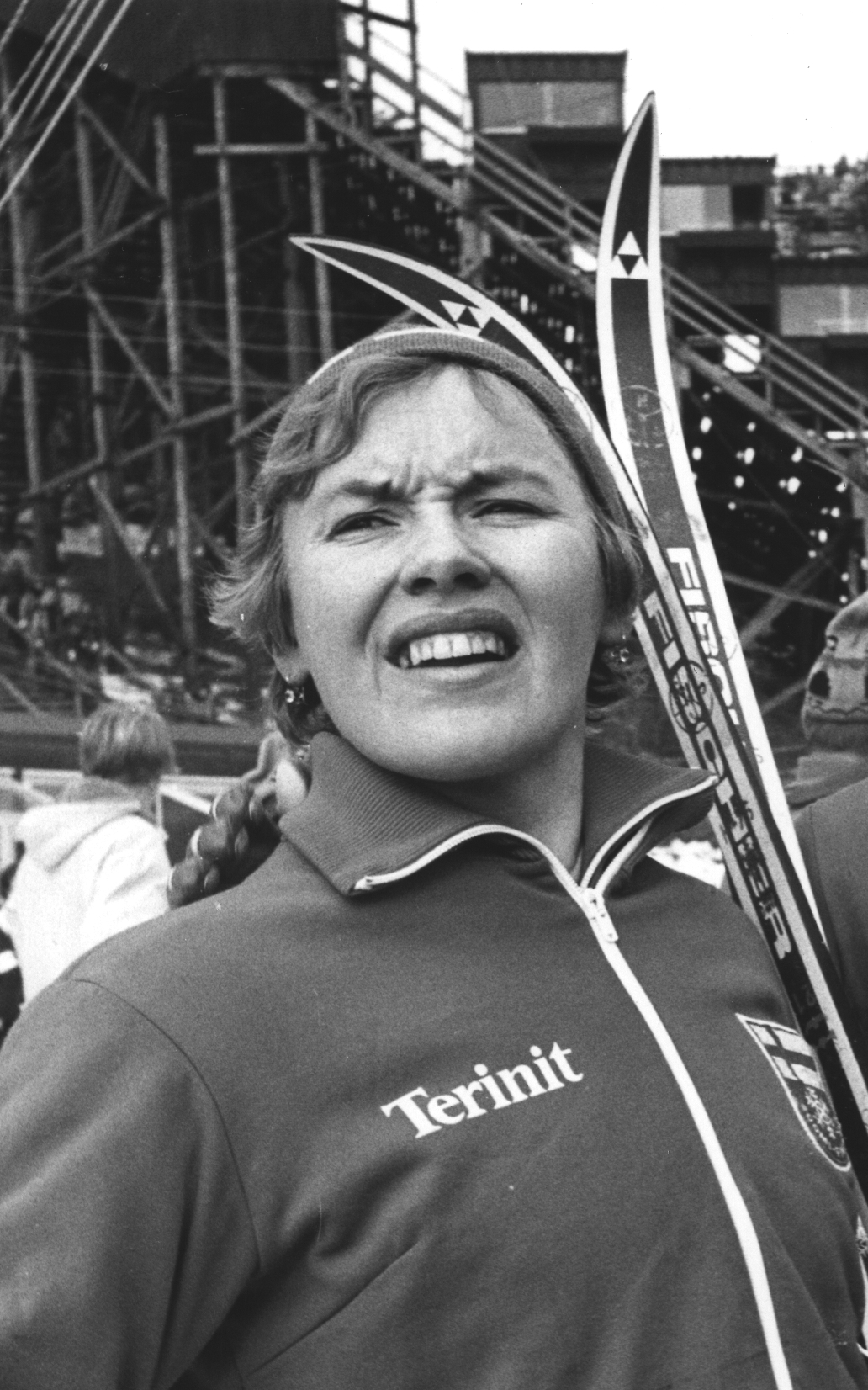
- Helena Takalo in March, 1976

Personal information
- Full name: Anni Helena Takalo
- Nationality: Finland
- Born: 28 October 1947 (age 78) Nivala, Finland

Sport
- Sport: Skiing

World Cup career
- Seasons: 1 – (1982)
- Indiv. starts: 3
- Indiv. podiums: 0
- Team starts: 1
- Team podiums: 0
- Overall titles: 0 – (47th in 1982)
Medal record
Women's cross-country skiing
Representing Finland
Olympic Games
Gold medal – first place	1976 Innsbruck	5 km
Silver medal – second place	1972 Sapporo	3 × 5 km relay
Silver medal – second place	1976 Innsbruck	10 km
Silver medal – second place	1976 Innsbruck	4 × 5 km relay
Bronze medal – third place	1980 Lake Placid	10 km
World Championships
Gold medal – first place	1978 Lahti	5 km
Gold medal – first place	1978 Lahti	4 × 5 km relay
Bronze medal – third place	1970 Vysoké Tatry	3 × 5 km relay
Bronze medal – third place	1974 Falun	10 km
Bronze medal – third place	1978 Lahti	20 km

Anni Helena Takalo (née Kivioja, born 28 October 1947) is a Finnish former cross-country skier. She was born in Nivala, and was dominant women's cross-country skiing in the 1970s, earning five Winter Olympic medals and four FIS Nordic World Ski Championships medals (golds in 5 km and 4 × 5 km relay (both 1978), and bronzes in 3 × 5 km relay (1970), 10 km (1974), and 20 km (1978).).

Takalo also won the women's 5 km at the Holmenkollen ski festival in 1976. For her cross-country skiing successes, she earned the Holmenkollen medal in 1977 (Shared with Hilkka Riihivuori and Walter Steiner).

== Cross-country skiing results ==
All results are sourced from the International Ski Federation (FIS).

=== Olympic Games ===
- 5 medals – (1 gold, 3 silver, 1 bronze)

Year	Age	5 km	10 km	3/4 × 5 km relay
1968	20	22	DNF	—
1972	24	9	5	Silver
1976	28	Gold	Silver	Silver
1980	32	5	Bronze	5

=== World Championships ===
- 5 medals – (2 gold, 3 bronze)

Year	Age	5 km	10 km	20 km	3/4 × 5 km relay
1970	22	8	7	—N/a	Bronze
1974	26	9	Bronze	—N/a	4
1978	30	Gold	13	Bronze	Gold
1982	34	29	—	24	4

=== World Cup ===
==== Season standings ====
Season	Age	Overall
1982	34	47
