= Władysława Majerczyk =

Polish cross-country skier

Personal information
- Nationality: Polish
- Born: 16 June 1952 (age 74) Poronin, Poland

Sport
- Sport: Cross-country skiing

Władysława Majerczyk (born 16 June 1952) is a Polish cross-country skier. She competed at the 1972 Winter Olympics and the 1976 Winter Olympics.

== Cross-country skiing results ==
=== Olympic Games ===
| Year | Age | 5 km | 10 km | 3/4 × 5 km relay |
|---|---|---|---|---|
| 1972 | 19 | 23 | 34 | — |
| 1976 | 23 | 24 | 20 | 8 |
