= Zinaida Amosova =

Soviet cross-country skier (born 1950)

Personal information
- Nationality: Kazakhstan
- Born: 12 January 1950 (age 76) Jambyl Region, Soviet Union

Sport
- Sport: Skiing
- Club: SKA Novosibirsk

World Cup career
- Seasons: 1983
- Indiv. starts: 3
- Indiv. podiums: 0
- Team starts: 0
- Overall titles: 0 – (26th in 1983)
Medal record
Women's cross-country skiing
Representing Soviet Union
Olympic Games
Gold medal – first place	1976 Innsbruck	4 × 5 km relay
World Championships
Gold medal – first place	1978 Lahti	10 km
Gold medal – first place	1978 Lahti	20 km
Bronze medal – third place	1978 Lahti	4 × 5 km relay

Zinaida Stepanovna Amosova (Russian: Зинаида Степановна Амосова) (born 12 January 1950 in Krupskaya kolkhoz, Talaz District, Dzhambul Oblast, Kazakh SSR) is a former Soviet cross-country skier who competed from 1976 to 1983, training at the Armed Forces sports society in Novosibirsk. She won a gold medal in the 4 × 5 km relay at the 1976 Winter Olympics in Innsbruck.

Amosova's biggest success was at the 1978 FIS Nordic World Ski Championships where she earned three medals. This included two golds (10 km, 20 km) and one bronze (4 × 5 km).

Amosova was awarded Order of the Badge of Honor in 1976.

== Cross-country skiing results ==
All results are sourced from the International Ski Federation (FIS).

=== Olympic Games ===
- 1 medal – (1 gold)

Year	Age	5 km	10 km	4 × 5 km relay
1976	26	6	6	Gold

=== World Championships ===
- 3 medals – (2 gold, 1 bronze)

Year	Age	5 km	10 km	20 km	4 × 5 km relay
1978	28	—	Gold	Gold	Bronze
1980	30	—N/a	—N/a	6	—N/a

=== World Cup ===
==== Season standings ====
Season	Age	Overall
1983	33	26
