= Nina Fyodorova =

Russian cross-country skier (1947–2019)

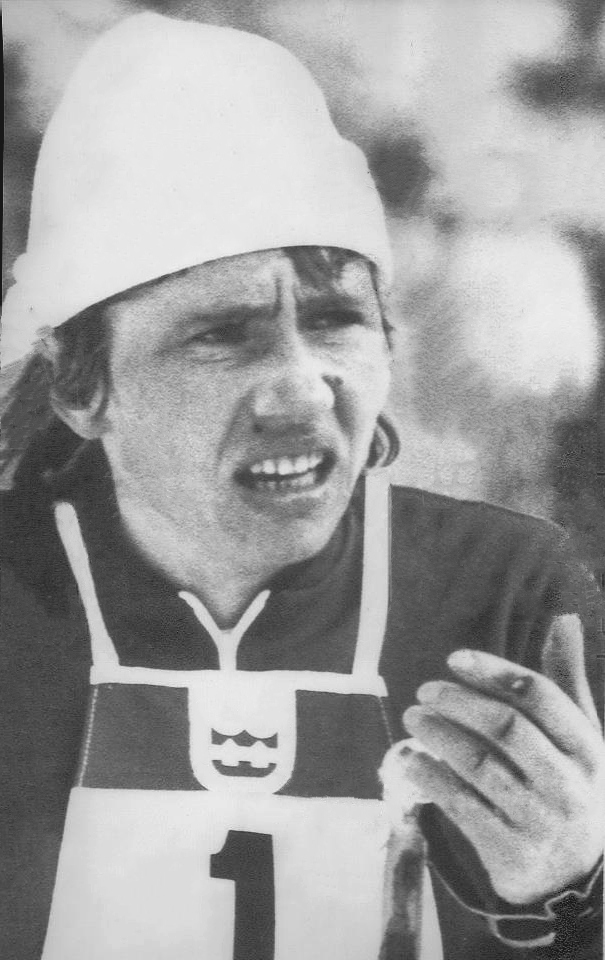
- Fyodorova with an injured hand at the 1976 Olympics

Personal information
- Born: 18 July 1947 Travino, Pskov Oblast, Russian SFSR, Soviet Union
- Died: 27 January 2019 (aged 71) Saint Petersburg, Russia
- Height: 160 cm (5 ft 3 in)
- Weight: 55 kg (121 lb)

Sport
- Sport: Cross-country skiing
- Club: Trud St. Petersburg
Medal record
Women's cross-country skiing
Representing the Soviet Union
Olympic Games
Gold medal – first place	1976 Innsbruck	4 × 5 km relay
Bronze medal – third place	1976 Innsbruck	5 km
Silver medal – second place	1980 Lake Placid	4 × 5 km relay
World Championships
Gold medal – first place	1970 Vysoké Tatry	3 × 5 km relay
Bronze medal – third place	1970 Vysoké Tatry	5 km
Gold medal – first place	1974 Falun	4 × 5 km relay

Nina Viktorovna Baldycheva (Russian: Нина Викторовна Балдычёва; also known as Baldychova, Fedorova, Baldycheva-Fedorova or Fyodorova; 18 July 1947 – 27 January 2019) was a Russian cross-country skier who competed from 1970 to 1980. She won three medals at the Winter Olympics with a gold in the 4 × 5 km relay (1976), a silver in the 4 × 5 km relay (1980), and a bronze in the 5 km (1976). In the relay in 1976, she injured her left hand in a fall at the start, but completed the race.

At the FIS Nordic World Ski Championships Fyodorova earned two gold (3 × 5 km relay: 1970, 4 × 5 km: 1974) and one bronze medals (5 km: 1970). Domestically she won one individual Soviet title, over 5 km in 1971, and eight relay titles (1969–73, 1975–76, 1979). After retiring from competitions she worked as a cross-country skiing coach in Saint Petersburg. In 1976 she was awarded the Order of the Badge of Honor.

== Cross-country skiing results ==
All results are sourced from the International Ski Federation (FIS).

=== Olympic Games ===
- 3 medals – (1 gold, 1 silver, 1 bronze)

Year	Age	5 km	10 km	3/4 × 5 km relay
1972	24	10	—	—
1976	28	Bronze	4	Gold
1980	32	5	6	Silver

=== World Championships ===
- 3 medals – (2 gold, 1 bronze)

Year	Age	5 km	10 km	20 km	3/4 × 5 km relay
1970	22	Bronze	—	—N/a	Gold
1974	26	5	—	—N/a	Gold
1980	32	—N/a	—N/a	5	—N/a
