= Maria Rautio =

Swedish cross-country skier

Personal information
- Nationality: Swedish
- Born: 8 July 1957 (age 68) Junosuando, Sweden

Sport
- Sport: Cross-country skiing

Maria Rautio (born 8 July 1957) is a Swedish cross-country skier. She competed in the women's 5 kilometres at the 1976 Winter Olympics.

== Cross-country skiing results ==
=== Olympic Games ===
Year	Age	5 km	10 km	4 × 5 km relay
1976	18	32	—	—
