= Eva Olsson =

Swedish skier

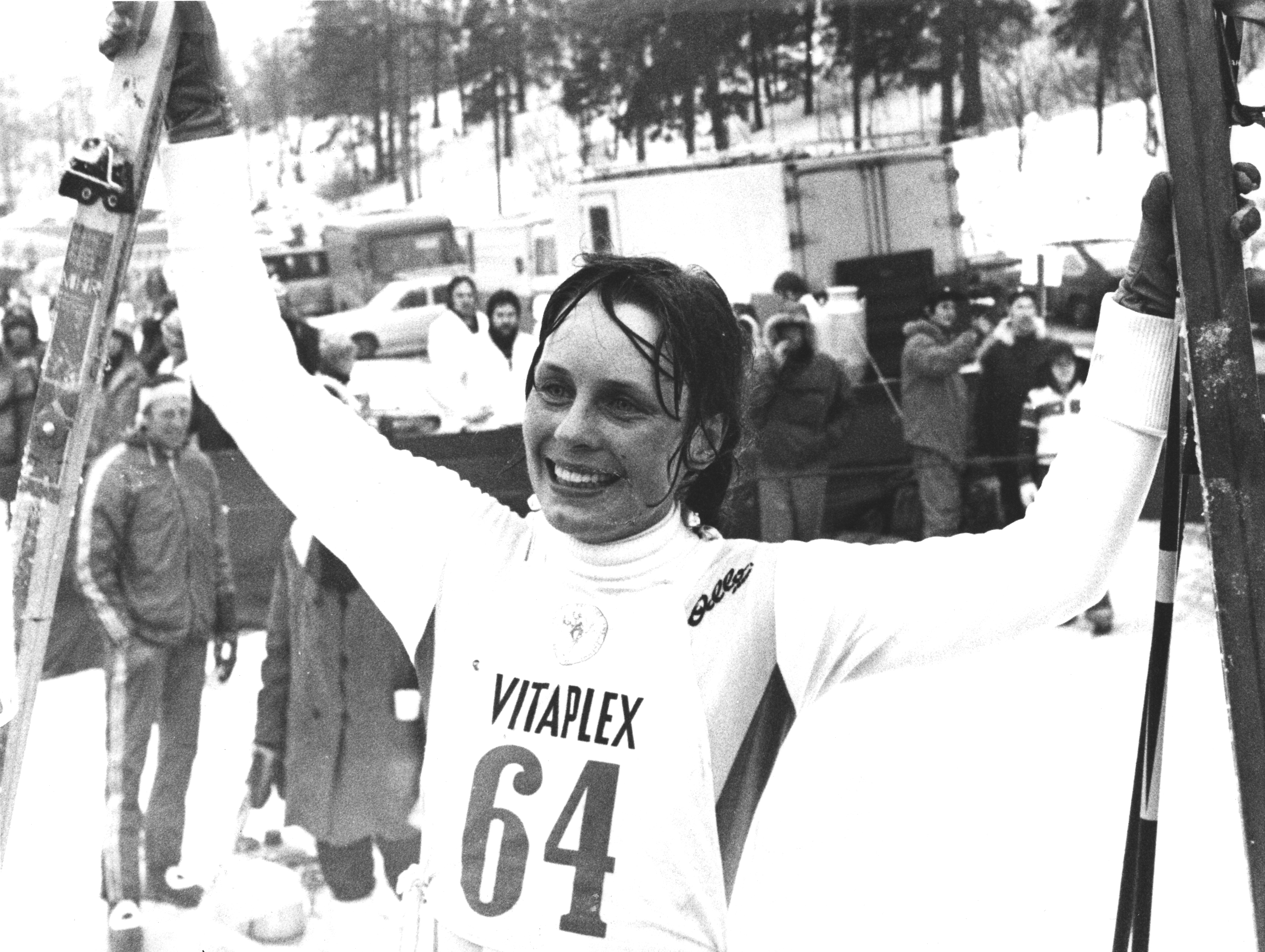
- Eva OIsson in March, 1977

Personal information
- Full name: Eva Birgitta Olsson
- Nationality: Swedish
- Born: 2 September 1951 (age 74) Stockholm, Sweden

Sport
- Sport: Cross-country skiing
- Club: Delsbo IF

Eva Olsson (born 2 September 1951) is a Swedish former cross-country skier. She competed at the 1972, 1976 and the 1980 Winter Olympics. She was also the flag bearer for Sweden at the 1980 Winter Olympics.

== Cross-country skiing results ==
All results are sourced from the International Ski Federation (FIS).

=== Olympic Games ===
| Year | Age | 5 km | 10 km | 3/4 × 5 km relay |
|---|---|---|---|---|
| 1972 | 20 | 15 | 23 | 8 |
| 1976 | 24 | 5 | 5 | 4 |
| 1980 | 28 | 12 | 10 | 6 |

=== World Championships ===
| Year | Age | 5 km | 10 km | 20 km | 4 × 5 km relay |
|---|---|---|---|---|---|
| 1978 | 26 | 8 | 12 | 7 | 4 |
