= Barbara Stöckl (cross-country skier) =

Austrian cross-country skier

Personal information
- Nationality: Austrian
- Born: 24 October 1956 (age 69) Kirchberg in Tirol, Austria

Sport
- Sport: Cross-country skiing

Barbara Stöckl (born 24 October 1956) is an Austrian cross-country skier. She competed in two events at the 1976 Winter Olympics.

== Cross-country skiing results ==
=== Olympic Games ===
Year	Age	5 km	10 km	4 × 5 km relay
1976	19	38	40	—
