= The Maid of Orleans (opera) =

Opera by Pyotr Ilyich Tchaikovsky

- Opera by Tchaikovsky
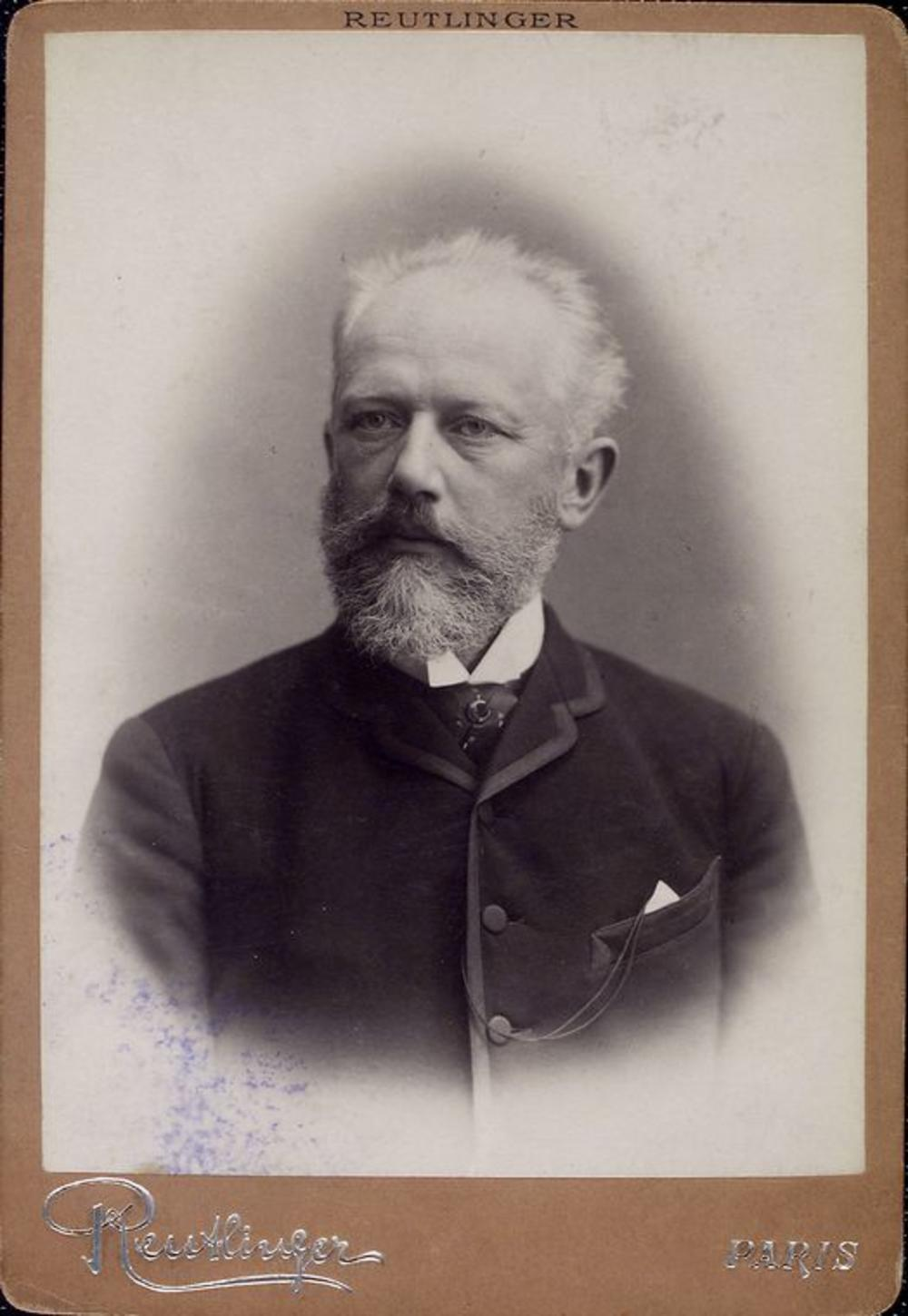
- Native title: Russian: Орлеанская дева
- Librettist: Tchaikovsky
- Language: Russian
- Based on: Several works about Joan of Arc
- Premiere: 25 February 1881; Mariinsky Theatre, Saint Petersburg

The Maid of Orleans (Russian: Орлеанская дева, romanized: Orleanskaja deva, lit. 'Virgin of Orleans') is an opera in 4 acts, 6 scenes, by Pyotr Ilyich Tchaikovsky. It was composed during 1878–1879 to a Russian libretto by the composer, based on several sources: Friedrich Schiller's The Maid of Orleans as translated by Vasily Zhukovsky; Jules Barbier's Jeanne d'Arc; Auguste Mermet's libretto for his own 1876 opera; and Henri Wallon's biography of Joan of Arc. Dedicated to conductor Eduard Nápravník, this work represents the composer's closest approach to French grand opera, albeit in the Russian language, notably with its inclusion of a ballet in act 2.

== Performance history ==
The world premiere was given on 25 February 1881 (13 February O.S.) at the Mariinsky Theatre in Saint Petersburg, conducted by Eduard Nápravník. Notable subsequent performances were given on 28 July 1882 in Prague under Adolf Čech, the first production of any Tchaikovsky opera outside Russia; in 1899 in Moscow by the Private Opera Society, conducted by Mikhail Ippolitov-Ivanov; and in 1907 in Moscow by the Zimin Opera, conducted by Palitsīn.

In 2025 the opera was performed in Amsterdam, by the Nationale Opera, directed by Dmitri Tcherniakov.

== Roles ==
Roles, voice types, premiere cast
Role	Voice type	Premiere cast 25 February 1881 (13 February O.S.) Conductor: Eduard Nápravník
King Charles VII	tenor	Mikhail Vasilyev
The Archbishop	bass	Vladimir Mayboroda
The Pope	tenor	
Dunois, a French knight	baritone	Fyodor Stravinsky
Lionel, a Burgundian knight	baritone	Ippolit Pryanishnikov
Thibaut d'Arc, Joan's father	bass	Mikhail Koryakin
Raymond, Joan's betrothed	tenor	Sokolov
Bertrand, a peasant	bass	
Soldier	bass	
Joan of Arc	soprano or mezzo-soprano	Mariya Kamenskaya
Agnès Sorel	soprano	Wilhelmina Raab
Angel, solo voice in the choir of angels	soprano	
Chorus, silent roles: Courtiers and ladies, French and English soldiers, knights, monks, Gypsies, pages, buffoons, dwarfs, minstrels, executioners, people

== Instrumentation ==
The opera is scored for the following forces:

- Strings: violins I and II, violas, cellos, double Basses, harp
- Woodwinds: piccolo, 3 flutes, 2 oboes, cor anglais, 2 clarinets (B-flat, A, C), 2 bassoons
- Brass: 4 horns (F, D, E-flat, E), 2 cornets (B-flat, A), 2 trumpets (E-flat, F, E, D, A), 3 trombones, tuba
- Percussion: timpani, triangle, tambourine, side drum, bass drum, tam-tam, bell
- Other: organ

== Synopsis ==
Time: Beginning of the 15th century, in the midst of the Hundred Years' War with England
Place: France

=== Act 1 ===
Introduction
Chorus of Maidens (No. 1)
Scena & terzetto (No. 2)
Scena (No. 3)
Chorus of peasants & scena (No. 4)
Scena (No. 5)
Hymn "King of the heavenly host" (No. 6)
Joan's aria "Farewell, you native hills and fields" (No. 7)
Finale (No. 8)
Joan's aria & chorus of angels (No. 8a)

In the square in front of the church village girls decorate an oak and sing songs. Peasant Thibaut of Arc is annoyed by their levity at such a terrible time for the fatherland. He is concerned about the fate of his daughter, Joan who is seventeen, and wants her to marry Raymond, to protect her from danger. But Joan feels another calling. An alarm sounds announcing the fall of Paris and the siege of Orleans. In a panic, the citizens pray for salvation; inspired, Joan predicts imminent victory. The girl says goodbye to her birthplace, hearing voices of angels blessing her heroic endeavor.

=== Act 2 ===
Entr'acte (No. 9)
Chorus of minstrels (No. 10)
Gypsy dance (No. 11a)
Dance of the pages & dwarves (No. 11b)
Dance of the clowns & tumblers (No. 11c)
Scena & duet (No. 12)
Agnes's arioso & duettino (No. 13)
Scena & Archbishop's narration (No. 14)
Joan's narration (No. 15)
Finale (No. 16)

In Château de Chinon the king is being entertained forgetting his duty with his beloved Agnès Sorel. Minstrels, pages, gypsies, clowns follow each other. The king is paralyzed by inaction. Neither the appearance of Knight Lauret, mortally wounded in the battle, nor the resignation of courageous Knight Dunois, who leaves to fight with honor ("I'm sorry! Monarch we do not have, I am not your servant any more...") can shake the king's decision to flee. The archbishop suddenly appears; courtiers and people tell the king about the rout of the British, the French victory, and the "glorious Maiden" who inspired the soldiers. Joan tells the astonished audience about the vision she had telling her to lead the fight. A vow of virginity was a condition of that victory. On the orders of king, Joan is put in command of the army.

=== Act 3 ===
Tableau 1 and Tableau 2

Scena & duet (No. 17)
March (No. 18)
Scena & duettino (No. 19)
Finale (No. 20)

Scene 1

Deep in the woods Joan fights Knight Lionel of Burgundy. He is struck, the helmet with a visor falls. Conquered by his beautiful young face, she cannot kill him. Lionel is moved by the generosity of Joan: "Rumor has it that you do not spare enemies, why mercy for me, alone?" She is shocked by her awakened feelings, remembering the vow. Lionel decides to side with the French and offers his sword to Dunois. In the heart of the recent enemy, a love for Joan grows.

Scene 2

The nation celebrates the king and Joan - the victor. Her father, however, believes that all the acts of his daughter are the devil's work and decides to save her soul, even at the cost of her life. When the king declares her savior of the fatherland, ordering an altar to be erected, the father accuses the daughter of dealing with Satan and challenges her to publicly prove her innocence: "Do your believe yourself holy and pure?" Joan does not answer, tormented by her love for Lionel. Dunois attempts to protect the heroine; frightened by a clap of thunder, the citizens, considering it a judgment from heaven, renounce her. Lionel tries to protect her, but Joan drives him away.

=== Act 4 ===
Introduction & scena (No. 21)
Duet & scena (No. 22)
Final scena (No. 23)

Scene 1

Joan is alone, abandoned in the remote woods. "To a mortal how dare I give the soul promised to the creator?" But when Lionel finds her, she eagerly responds to him. The happy moment is cut short as English soldiers arrive, killing Lionel and capturing Joan.

Scene 2

In the square of Rouen, a pyre is built. Joan is to be executed. The citizens filling the square sympathize with the heroine, and doubts grow about the justice of the impending execution. But Joan is tied to a pole, a fire ignited. Holding a cross, Joan cries out to God, humbly ready to die. She hears voices of angels bearing forgiveness.

== Recordings ==
- 1946, Boris Khaykin (conductor), Kirov Theatre Orchestra and Chorus, Sofia Preobrazhenskaya (Joan), V. Kilchevskyi (King Charles), N. Konstantinov (Archbishop), O. Kashevarova (Agnes Sorel), V. Runovsky (Dunois), L. Solomiak (Lionel), V. Ulianov (Raymond), I. Yashugin (Thibaut), I. Shashkov (Bertrand), S. Vodsinsky (Soldier), A. Marin (Lore), M. Merzhevskaya (Angel), N. Grishanov (Minstrel)
- 1971, Gennady Rozhdestvensky (conductor), Moscow Radio Symphony Orchestra and Chorus, Irina Arkhipova (Joan), Vladimir Makhov (King Charles), Klavdiya Radchenko (Agnes Sorel), Vladimir Valaitis (Dunois), Sergey Yavkovchenko (Lionel), Lev Vernigora, (Archbishop), Andrey Sokolov (Raymond), Viktor Selivanov (Bertrand), Vartan Makelian (Soldier), Yevgeny Vladimirov (Thibaut) [HMV ASD 2879-82]
- 1993, Alexander Lazarev (conductor), Bolshoy Theatre Orchestra and Chorus, Nina Rautio (Joan), Oleg Kulko (King Charles), Mariya Gavrilova (Agnes Sorel), Mikhail Krutikov (Dunois), Vladimir Redkin (Lionel), Gleb Nikolsky (Archbishop), Arkady Mishenkin (Raymond), Maksim Mikhaylov II (Bertrand), Anatoly Babikin (Soldier), Zoya Smolyanikova (Angel), Vyacheslav Pochapsky (Thibaut)
