= Birgit Schreiber =

East German cross-country skier

Medal record

Women's cross-country skiing

Representing East Germany

World Championships
| Silver medal – second place | 1978 Lahti | 4 × 5 km relay |

Junior World Championships
| Gold medal – first place | 1977; Sainte-Croix | 3 × 5 km relay |
| Gold medal – first place | 1977; Sainte-Croix | 5 km |
| Gold medal – first place | 1979 Mont-Sainte-Anne | 3 × 5 km relay |

Birgit Schreiber is a former East German cross-country skier who competed from 1978 to 1980. She won a silver medal in the 4 × 5 km at the 1978 FIS Nordic World Ski Championships in Lahti.
