= Cross-country skiing at the 1976 Winter Olympics – Women's 10 kilometre =

Olympic skiing event

Women's 10km at the XI Olympic Winter Games
- Cross-country skiing
- Venue: Cross Country Skiing Stadium
- Date: 10 February 1976
- Competitors: 44 from 14 nations
- Winning time: 30:13.41

Medalists
| 1st place, gold medalist(s) | | Raisa Smetanina; Soviet Union |
| 2nd place, silver medalist(s) | | Helena Kivioja-Takalo; Finland |
| 3rd place, bronze medalist(s) | | Galina Kulakova; Soviet Union |

The Women's 10 kilometre cross-country skiing event was part of the cross-country skiing programme at the 1976 Winter Olympics, in Innsbruck, Austria. It was the seventh appearance of the event. The competition was held on 10 February 1976, at the Cross Country Skiing Stadium.

== Results ==
| Rank | Name | Country | Time |
|---|---|---|---|
| 1 | Raisa Smetanina | Soviet Union | 30:13.41 |
| 2 | Helena Takalo | Finland | 30:14.28 |
| 3 | Galina Kulakova | Soviet Union | 30:38.61 |
| 4 | Nina Fyodorova-Baldycheva | Soviet Union | 30:52.58 |
| 5 | Eva Olsson | Sweden | 31:08.72 |
| 6 | Zinaida Amosova | Soviet Union | 31:11.23 |
| 7 | Barbara Petzold | East Germany | 31:12.20 |
| 8 | Veronika Hesse-Schmidt | East Germany | 31:12.33 |
| 9 | Hilkka Riihivuori-Kuntola | Finland | 31:29.39 |
| 10 | Lena Carlzon-Lundbäck | Sweden | 31:33.06 |
| 11 | Marjatta Kajosmaa | Finland | 31:35.50 |
| 12 | Sigrun Krause | East Germany | 31:39.76 |
| 13 | Anna Pasiarová | Czechoslovakia | 31:44.97 |
| 14 | Monika Debertshäuser | East Germany | 31:50.06 |
| 15 | Grete Kummen | Norway | 32:02.59 |
| 16 | Görel Partapuoli | Sweden | 32:04.63 |
| 17 | Blanka Paulů | Czechoslovakia | 32:06.54 |
| 18 | Berit Kvello | Norway | 32:17.60 |
| 19 | Gabriela Svobodová-Sekajová | Czechoslovakia | 32:28.76 |
| 20 | Władysława Majerczyk | Poland | 32:30.68 |
| 21 | Marie Johansson-Risby | Sweden | 32:33.18 |
| 22 | Marja-Liisa Kirvesniemi-Hämäläinen | Finland | 32:37.72 |
| 23 | Berit Johannessen | Norway | 32:46.76 |
| 24 | Marit Myrmæl | Norway | 32:47.21 |
| 25 | Michaela Endler | West Germany | 32:55.62 |
| 26 | Anna Pawlusiak | Poland | 33:01.47 |
| 27 | Anna Gębala-Duraj | Poland | 33:13.21 |
| 28 | Sharon Firth | Canada | 33:15.20 |
| 29 | Shirley Firth | Canada | 33:16.50 |
| 30 | Mikiko Terui | Japan | 33:25.81 |
| 31 | Iris Schulze | West Germany | 33:43.82 |
| 32 | Sue Holloway | Canada | 34:03.49 |
| 33 | Maria Trebunia | Poland | 34:14.44 |
| 34 | Joan Groothuysen | Canada | 34:16.35 |
| 35 | Alena Bartošová | Czechoslovakia | 34:18.73 |
| 36 | Martha Rockwell | United States | 34:21.34 |
| 37 | Jana Hlavaty | United States | 34:48.88 |
| 38 | Claudia Sprenger | Liechtenstein | 34:57.03 |
| 39 | Milena Kordež | Yugoslavia | 35:15.54 |
| 40 | Barbara Stöckl | Austria | 35:28.99 |
| 41 | Sylvia Schweiger | Austria | 36:32.93 |
| 42 | Twila Hinkle | United States | 36:35.49 |
| 43 | Margie Mahoney | United States | 37:07.18 |
| 44 | Gertrud Gasteiger | Austria | 37:35.77 |
