= Lena Carlzon-Lundbäck =

Swedish cross-country skier

Personal information
- Full name: Lena Elisabeth Carlzon-Lundbäck
- Nationality: Sweden
- Born: 26 March 1954 (age 72) Gällivare, Sweden

Sport
- Sport: Skiing
- Club: Malmbergets AIF

World Cup career
- Seasons: 1 – (1982)
- Indiv. starts: 2
- Indiv. podiums: 0
- Team starts: 1
- Team podiums: 0
- Overall titles: 0 – (36th in 1982)

Lena Carlzon-Lundbäck (born 26 March 1954) is a Swedish former cross-country skier, competing for Malmbergets AIF at club level. She also represented Sweden during the 1976 Olympic Winter Games in Innsbruck and in 1980 in Lake Placid, participating both in individual events and relays. Her best team result was being part of the Swedish fourth-placed relay team in 1976, while her best individual result is two 10th places, at the 5 kilometers race in 1976 and the 10 kilometers race in 1980.

She became Swedish national champion totally eight times.

== Cross-country skiing results ==
All results are sourced from the International Ski Federation (FIS).

=== Olympic Games ===
| Year | Age | 5 km | 10 km | 4 × 5 km relay |
|---|---|---|---|---|
| 1976 | 21 | 14 | 10 | 4 |
| 1980 | 25 | 10 | 11 | 6 |

=== World Championships ===
| Year | Age | 5 km | 10 km | 20 km | 4 × 5 km relay |
|---|---|---|---|---|---|
| 1974 | 19 | — | 12 | —N/a | 5 |
| 1978 | 23 | 11 | 7 | 15 | 4 |
| 1982 | 27 | 9 | 21 | DNF | 6 |

=== World Cup ===
==== Season standings ====
| Season | Age | Overall |
|---|---|---|
| 1982 | 27 | 36 |
