= Christer Johansson =

Christer Johansson may refer to:

- Christer Johansson (poker player) (born 1970), Swedish professional sports bettor and poker player
- Christer Johansson (skier) (born 1950), former Swedish cross country skier
- Christer Johansson (table tennis), Swedish table tennis player
