= Christel Meinel =

East German cross-country skier (born 1957)

Personal information
- Born: 24 December 1957 (age 68)

Sport
- Sport: Skiing
- Club: SC Dynamo Klingenthal
Medal record
Women's cross-country skiing
Representing East Germany
World Championships
Silver medal – second place	1978 Lahti	4 × 5 km relay

Christel Meinel (born December 24, 1957) is a former East German cross-country skier who competed during the late 1970s. She won a silver medal in the 4 × 5 km relay at the 1978 FIS Nordic World Ski Championships in Lahti and finished fifth in the 5 km at those same championships. She competed for SC Dynamo Klingenthal.

== Cross-country skiing results ==
=== World Championships ===
- 1 medal – (1 silver)

Year	Age	5 km	10 km	20 km	4 × 5 km relay
1978	20	5	9	10	Silver
