= Sylvia Schweiger =

Austrian cross-country skier

Personal information
- Nationality: Austrian
- Born: 4 January 1959 (age 67) Graz, Austria

Sport
- Sport: Cross-country skiing

Sylvia Schweiger (born 4 January 1959) is an Austrian cross-country skier. She competed in two events at the 1976 Winter Olympics.

== Cross-country skiing results ==
=== Olympic Games ===
Year	Age	5 km	10 km	4 × 5 km relay
1976	27	42	41	—
