= Hubert Gundolf =

Austrian speed skater

Personal information
- Nationality: Austrian
- Born: 17 April 1952 (age 72); Kappel am Krappfeld, Austria

Sport
- Sport: Speed skating

Hubert Gundolf (born 17 April 1952) is an Austrian speed skater. He competed in two events at the 1976 Winter Olympics.
