= Sepp Kriechbaum =

Austrian ice hockey player

Personal information
- Nationality: Austrian
- Born: 26 April 1949 (age 76) Zell am See, Austria

Sport
- Sport: Ice hockey

Sepp Kriechbaum (born 26 April 1949) is an Austrian ice hockey player. He competed in the men's tournament at the 1976 Winter Olympics.
