= Franz Köfel =

Austrian bobsledder

Personal information
- Nationality: Austrian
- Born: 26 February 1947 (age 78); Klagenfurt, Austria

Sport
- Sport: Bobsleigh

Franz Köfel (born 26 February 1947) is an Austrian bobsledder. He competed in the two man and the four man events at the 1976 Winter Olympics.
