= Herbert Mörtl =

Austrian ice hockey player

Personal information
- Nationality: Austrian
- Born: 4 November 1948 (age 77) Ehrwald, Austria

Sport
- Sport: Ice hockey

Herbert Mörtl (born 4 November 1948) is an Austrian ice hockey player. He competed in the men's tournament at the 1976 Winter Olympics.
