= Görel Partapuoli =

Swedish cross-country skier

Personal information
- Nationality: Swedish
- Born: 25 February 1954 (age 72) Sorsele, Sweden

Sport
- Sport: Cross-country skiing

Görel Partapuoli (born 25 February 1954) is a Swedish cross-country skier. She competed in three events at the 1976 Winter Olympics.

== Cross-country skiing results ==
=== Olympic Games ===
Year	Age	5 km	10 km	4 × 5 km relay
1976	22	22	16	4

=== World Championships ===
Year	Age	5 km	10 km	4 × 5 km relay
1974	20	11	—	5
