= Othmar Russ =

Austrian ice hockey player

Personal information
- Nationality: Austrian
- Born: 5 November 1952 Lieboch, Austria
- Died: 1 April 2019 (aged 66)

Sport
- Sport: Ice hockey

Othmar Russ (5 November 1952 – 1 April 2019) was an Austrian ice hockey player. He competed in the men's tournament at the 1976 Winter Olympics.
