= Lennart Carlsson (speed skater) =

Swedish speed skater

Personal information
- Nationality: Swedish
- Born: 28 August 1951 (age 73); Karlsborg, Sweden

Sport
- Sport: Speed skating

Lennart Carlsson (born 28 August 1951) is a Swedish speed skater. He competed in three events at the 1976 Winter Olympics.
