= Peter Zini =

Austrian ice hockey player (born 1951)

Personal information
- Nationality: Austrian
- Born: 3 October 1951 (age 73); Innsbruck, Austria

Sport
- Sport: Ice hockey

Peter Zini (born 3 October 1951) is an Austrian ice hockey player. He competed in the men's tournament at the 1976 Winter Olympics.
