= Berend Schabus =

Austrian speed skater

Personal information
- Nationality: Austrian
- Born: 7 October 1957 (age 67); Wolfsberg, Austria

Sport
- Sport: Speed skating

Berend Schabus (born 7 October 1957) is an Austrian speed skater. He competed in three events at the 1976 Winter Olympics.
