= Gudmund Söderin =

Swedish alpine skier (born 1952)

Erik Gudmund Eriksson Söderin (born 10 October 1952 in Frösön) is a Swedish former alpine skier who competed in the 1976 Winter Olympics.
