= Alexander Sadjina =

Austrian ice hockey player

Personal information
- Nationality: Austrian
- Born: 14 November 1954 (age 71) Klagenfurt, Austria

Sport
- Sport: Ice hockey

Alexander Sadjina (born 14 November 1954) is an Austrian ice hockey player. He competed in the men's tournament at the 1976 Winter Olympics.
