= Nina Rautio =

Russian operatic soprano (born 1957)

- Born: 21 September 1957 (age 69)
- Occupation: Opera singer (soprano)
- Website: ninarautio.com

Nina Rautio (born 21 September 1957) is a Russian operatic soprano.

== Biography ==
For the first nineteen years of her life, Nina Rautio lived in Petrozavodsk (Republic of Karelia, Russia). To begin with, she graduated as a pianist from the Petrozavodsk School of Music, and then completed a Dual Degree, studying theory and singing at the K.E. Rautio Music College.

She began her operatic career in earnest in 1984, performing a number of leading roles as part of the Mikhaylovsky Theatre (formerly the Maly Opera Theatre) in St. Petersburg. After competing in the Tchaikovsky Competition she was invited to join the Bolshoi Theatre company.

One of the directors of the Bolshoi company, V.G. Milkov, offered this appraisal of Nina Rautio's talent: "She wields a voice possessed of the most radiant timbre, imbued with a wide palette of shades and hues, all underpinned by an acting ability of great resolve and persuasion". Renowned Russian music critic A.E. Hripin noted that "any classification of this soprano can only be tentative and provisional, for she combines all the colours and sounds feasible for a female voice, from the velvety contralto timbre of the lower register to the brilliant coloratura at the high end of her diapason. Her vocal range is unique – from Es3 to Es6. The lower, "chest" register envelops the ear, it's dense and resonant. The top is remarkable for its clear, silvery penetration. She combines tremendous virtuosity with incredible power..." ("SK", 06/10/1990).

She first sang in the West in 1991 when she travelled to the Metropolitan Opera, New York, and the Edinburgh festival with the Bolshoi Company.

In the early 1990s Nina relocated to London and has since performed across the world. She made many critically acclaimed appearances on the stage of the Royal Opera House, London, as Amelia ("Un Ballo in maschera"), as the eponymous heroine in "Aida", Desdemona in "Othello" (all under Daniele Gatti), as well as Abigaille in Verdi's "Nabucco"; performed "Aida" with Daniel Oren at the Teatro dell'Opera di Roma; took on the title roles in "Tosca" and "Aida" for the New York Metropolitan Opera productions; sang the role of Lisa in Opera Bastille's production of "The Queen of Spades" (dir. A.S. Konchalovsky); appeared as Aida and performed the soprano solo part in Verdi's "Requiem", with Zubin Mehta conducting the Israel Philharmonic Orchestra.

Back in Russia, Nina Rautio has been involved in a number of projects, such as the "Golden Voices of the Opera" festival in Moscow; the "Stars of the Operatic Stage" concerts, Moscow; the International M.D. Mikhailov Opera Festival in Chebokhsary; the "Aliabyevskaya Musikalnaya Osen" festival.

In 2002–2003, in the role of artistic director of the Musical Theatre of Karelia, Nina Rautio directed their production of Mascagni's "Cavalleria rusticana", as well as taking on the part of Santuzza.

Nina Rautio currently resides in the United Kingdom, London.

== Roles ==
=== Italian ===
- Amelia ("Un Ballo in Maschera" Giuseppe Verdi)
- Elisabeth of Valois ("Don Carlos" Giuseppe Verdi)
- Aida ("Aida" Giuseppe Verdi)
- Leonora ("Il Trovatore" Giuseppe Verdi)
- Аmelia ("Simone Boccanegra" Giuseppe Verdi)
- Abigail ("Nabucco" Giuseppe Verdi)
- Lady Macbeth ("Macbeth" Giuseppe Verdi)
- Violetta ("La Traviata" Giuseppe Verdi)
- Desdemona ("Otello" Giuseppe Verdi)
- Manon Lescaut ("Manon Lescaut" Giacomo Puccini)
- Tosca ("Tosca" Giacomo Puccini)
- Maddalena de Coigny ("Andrea Chenier" Umberto Giordano)
- Donna Anna ("Don Giovanni" Моzart)
- Маtilda ("William Tell" Rossini)
- Santuzza ("Cavalleria Rusticana" Mascagni)

=== Russian ===
- Tatyana ("Eugene Onegin" Tchaikovsky)
- Lisa ("Queen of Spades" Tchaikovsky)
- Joan ("Maid of Orleans" Tchaikovsky)
- Mariya ("Mazeppa" Tchaikovsky)
- Oksana ("Christmas Eve" Rimsky-Korsakov)
- Parasha ("Mavra" Stravinsky)
- Pristess of Faust ("Quinto Fabio" Bortniansky)
- Concerts
- Mahler - Symphony No.2
- Verdi - Requiem

== Discography ==
=== CD and DVD ===
- 1992 — Puccini: Manon Lescaut, Sony Classical, Teatro alla Scala;
- 1993 — Tchaikovsky: Maid of Orleans, Warner Music Group;
- 1995 — The Puccini Experience, Conifer Records, Royal Opera House;
- 1996 — Tchaikovsky: Romances, 2 part, Conifer Records;
- 1996 — Tchaikovsky: Romances, 5 part, Conifer Records;
- 1996 — Rachmaninov: Romances, Conifer Records;
