= Nils Vinberg =

Swedish luger (born 1957)

Personal information
- Nationality: Swedish
- Born: 18 June 1957 (age 67); Stockholm, Sweden

Sport
- Sport: Luge

Nils Vinberg (born 18 June 1957) is a Swedish luger. He competed in the men's singles and doubles events at the 1976 Winter Olympics.
