= Klaus Farbmacher =

Austrian biathlete (born 1946)

Personal information
- Nationality: Austrian
- Born: 10 September 1946 (age 78); Innsbruck, Austria

Sport
- Sport: Biathlon

Klaus Farbmacher (born 10 September 1946) is an Austrian biathlete. He competed in the 20 km individual event at the 1976 Winter Olympics.
