= Grete Kummen =

Norwegian cross-country skier

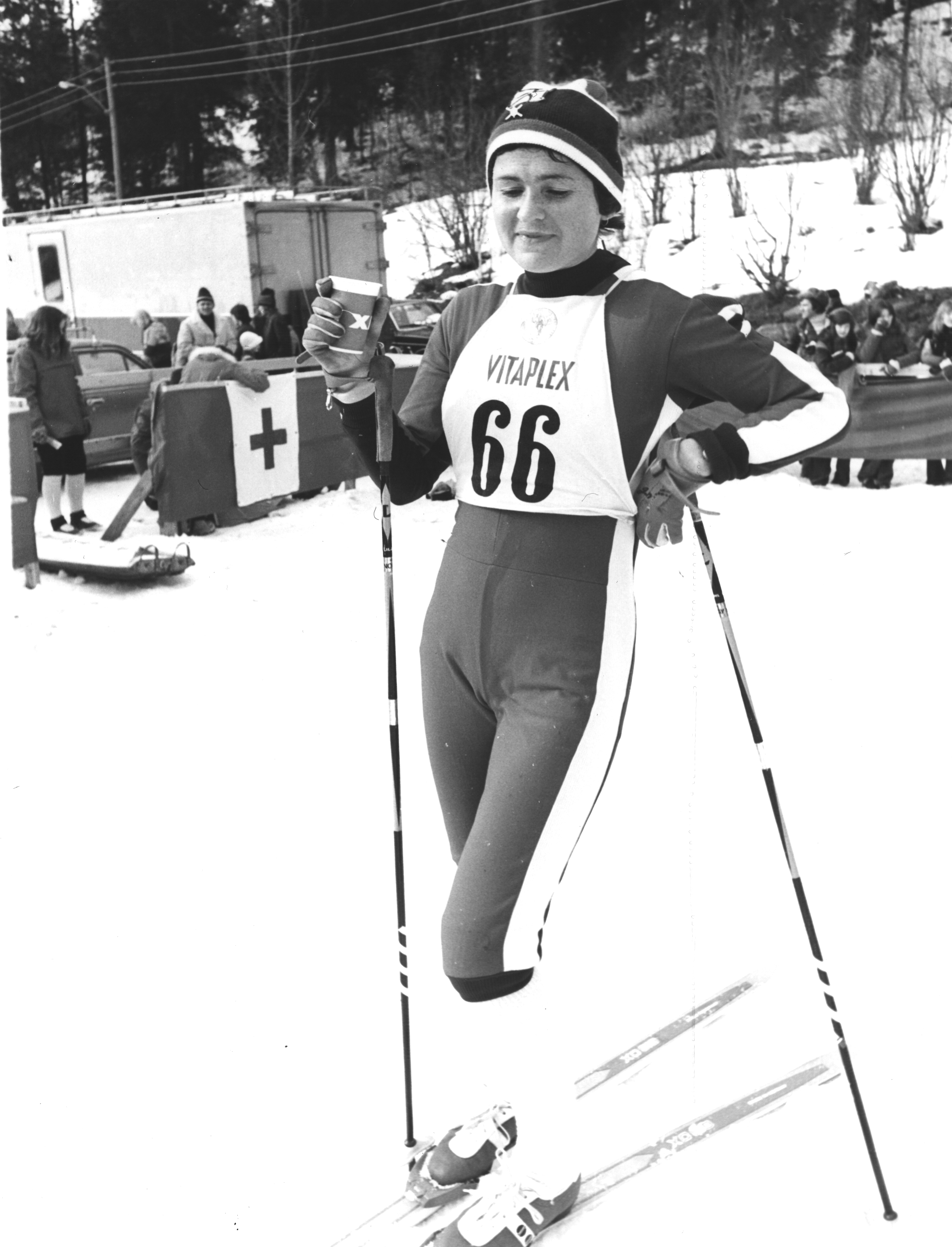
- Grete Kummen in March, 1976

Personal information
- Nationality: Norwegian
- Born: 21 April 1952 (age 73) Sigdal

Sport
- Sport: Cross-country skiing
- Club: IL Heming

Grete Kummen (born 21 April 1952) is a Norwegian cross-country skier, born in Sigdal. She represented the club IL Heming. She competed in 5 km, 10 km and the relay at the 1976 Winter Olympics in Innsbruck. She was Norwegian champion in 10 km in 1976.

== Cross-country skiing results ==
=== Olympic Games ===
Year	Age	5 km	10 km	4 × 5 km relay
1976	23	8	15	5
