= Dan Johansson =

Swedish speed skater (born 1950)

Personal information
- Nationality: Swedish
- Born: 11 July 1950 (age 75) Örnsköldsvik, Sweden

Sport
- Sport: Speed skating

Dan Johansson (born 11 July 1950) is a Swedish speed skater. He competed in two events at the 1976 Winter Olympics.
