= Sune Adolfsson =

Swedish biathlete (born 1950)

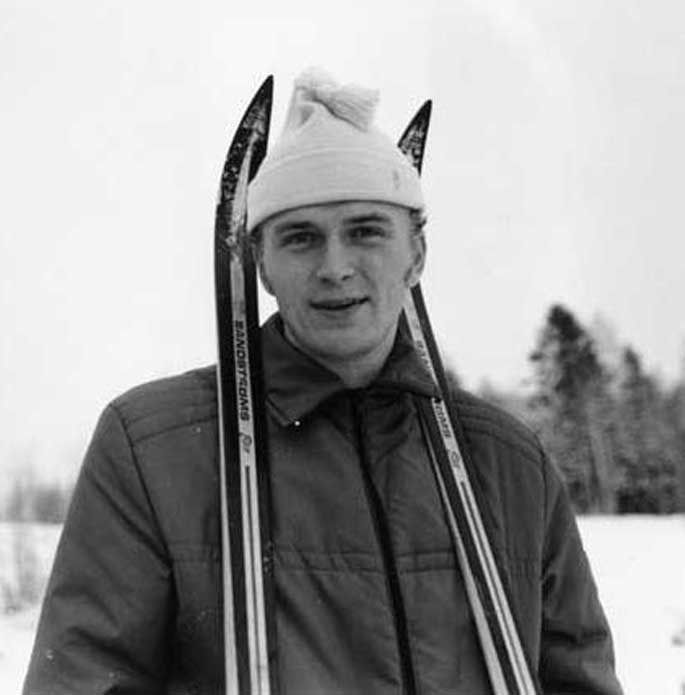

Personal information
- Full name: Sune Ronald Adolfsson
- Nationality: Swedish
- Born: 11 March 1950 (age 75); Höljes, Sweden
- Height: 1.80 m (5 ft 11 in)
- Weight: 74 kg (163 lb)

Sport
- Sport: Biathlon
- Club: SK Bore

Sune Roland Adolfsson (born 11 March 1950) is a Swedish biathlete. He was part of the Swedish team reserve at the 1972 Winter Olympics. At the 1976 Winter Olympics, he placed eighth in the 4×7.5 km relay. His younger brother Ronnie Adolfsson competed in biathlon at the 1980 and 1984 Olympics.
