= Andreas Schwab (bobsleigh) =

Austrian bobsledder

Personal information
- Nationality: Austrian
- Born: 16 November 1952 (age 72); Styria, Austria

Sport
- Sport: Bobsleigh

Andreas Schwab (born 16 November 1952) is an Austrian bobsledder. He competed in the two man and the four man events at the 1976 Winter Olympics.
