= Mats Wallberg =

Swedish speed skater

Mats Wallberg (born February 21, 1949, in Gunnarskog) is a former ice speed skater from Sweden, who represented his native country in two consecutive Winter Olympics, starting in 1972 in Sapporo, Japan.
