= Daniel Gritsch =

Austrian ice hockey player

Personal information
- Nationality: Austrian
- Born: 14 March 1954 (age 71); Innsbruck, Austria

Sport
- Sport: Ice hockey

Daniel Gritsch (born 14 March 1954) is an Austrian ice hockey player. He competed in the men's tournament at the 1976 Winter Olympics.
