= Ludwig Kronfuß =

Austrian speed skater

Personal information
- Nationality: Austrian
- Born: 16 July 1950 (age 74); Vienna, Austria

Sport
- Sport: Speed skating

Ludwig Kronfuß (born 16 July 1950) is an Austrian speed skater. He competed in two events at the 1976 Winter Olympics.
