= Franz-Josef Weber =

Austrian biathlete (born 1952)

Personal information
- Nationality: Austrian
- Born: 14 March 1952 (age 73) Lohnsburg, Austria

Sport
- Sport: Biathlon

Franz-Josef Weber (born 14 March 1952) is an Austrian biathlete. He competed at the 1976 Winter Olympics and the 1980 Winter Olympics.
