= Walter Schneider (ice hockey) =

Austrian ice hockey player

Personal information
- Nationality: Austrian
- Born: 22 August 1953 (age 73) Vienna, Austria

Sport
- Sport: Ice hockey

Walter Schneider (born 22 August 1953) is an Austrian ice hockey player. He competed in the men's tournament at the 1976 Winter Olympics.
