= Rudolf König (ice hockey) =

Austrian ice hockey player

Personal information
- Nationality: Austrian
- Born: 25 April 1957 (age 68) Klagenfurt, Austria

Sport
- Sport: Ice hockey

Rudolf König (born 25 April 1957) is an Austrian ice hockey player. He competed in the men's tournaments at the 1976 Winter Olympics, the 1984 Winter Olympics and the 1988 Winter Olympics.
