= Werner Vogel =

Austrian cross-country skier

Personal information
- Nationality: Austrian
- Born: 11 October 1948 (age 76); Seckau, Austria

Sport
- Sport: Cross-country skiing

Werner Vogel (born 11 October 1948) is an Austrian cross-country skier. He competed in the men's 15 kilometre event at the 1976 Winter Olympics.
