= Reinhold Feichter =

Austrian cross-country skier (born 1952)

Personal information
- Nationality: Austrian
- Born: 11 June 1952 (age 72); Feldkirchen, Austria

Sport
- Sport: Cross-country skiing

Reinhold Feichter (born 11 June 1952) is an Austrian cross-country skier. He competed in the men's 30 kilometre event at the 1976 Winter Olympics.
