= Mikiko Terui =

Japanese cross-country skier (born 1952)

Personal information
- Nationality: Japanese
- Born: 19 October 1952 (age 74) Akita, Japan

Sport
- Sport: Cross-country skiing

Mikiko Terui (Kanji:照井 美喜子, born 19 October 1952) is a Japanese cross-country skier. She competed in two events at the 1976 Winter Olympics.
