= Claudia Sprenger =

Liechtenstein cross-country skier (born 1958)

Personal information
- Nationality: Liechtenstein
- Born: 22 March 1958 (age 66)

Sport
- Sport: Cross-country skiing

Claudia Sprenger (born 22 March 1958) is a Liechtensteiner cross-country skier. She competed in two events at the 1976 Winter Olympics. In the 5 kilometer Women's Cross-Country Ski event, Sprenger placed 40th, and in the 10 kilometer Women's Cross-Country Ski event, she placed 38th. She was 17 years old when she competed in the Olympics.
