= Herbert Wachter =

Austrian cross-country skier

Personal information
- Nationality: Austrian
- Born: 4 May 1940 (age 85); Villach, Nazi Germany

Sport
- Sport: Cross-country skiing

Herbert Wachter (born 4 May 1940) is an Austrian cross-country skier. He competed at the 1972 Winter Olympics and the 1976 Winter Olympics.
