= Twila Hinkle =

American cross-country skier (born 1954)

Personal information
- Born: November 9, 1954 (age 70); Denver, Colorado, United States

Sport
- Sport: Cross-country skiing

Twila Hinkle (born November 9, 1954) is an American cross-country skier. She competed in two events at the 1976 Winter Olympics.
