= Cross-country skiing at the 1976 Winter Olympics – Women's 4 × 5 kilometre relay =

Women's 4 × 5 kilometre relay at the XII Olympic Winter Games
- Cross-country skiing
- Venue: Cross Country Skiing Stadium
- Date: 12 February 1976
- Competitors: 36 from 9 nations
- Winning time: 1:07:49.75

Medalists
1st place, gold medalist(s)		Nina Baldycheva; Zinaida Amosova; Raisa Smetanina; Galina Kulakova	Soviet Union
2nd place, silver medalist(s)		Liisa Suikhonen; Marjatta Kajosmaa; Hiikka Kuntola; Helena Takalo	Finland
3rd place, bronze medalist(s)		Monika Debertshäuser; Sigrun Krause; Barbara Petzold; Veronika Hesse	East Germany

The Women's 4 × 5 kilometre relay cross-country skiing event was part of the cross-country skiing programme at the 1976 Winter Olympics, in Innsbruck, Austria. It was the sixth appearance of the women's relay event and the first to have a team of four skiers, instead of three. The competition was held on 12 February 1976, at the Cross Country Skiing Stadium.

== Results ==
Rank	Name	Country	Time
1	Nina Baldycheva; Zinaida Amosova; Raisa Smetanina; Galina Kulakova	Soviet Union	1:07:49.75
2	Liisa Suihkonen; Marjatta Kajosmaa; Hiikka Kuntola; Helena Takalo	Finland	1:08:36.57
3	Monika Debertshäuser; Sigrun Krause; Barbara Petzold; Veronika Hesse	East Germany	1:09:57.95
4	Lena Carlzon-Lundbäck; Görel Partapuoli; Marie Johansson-Risby; Eva Olsson	Sweden	1:10:14.68
5	Berit Kvello; Marit Myrmæl; Berit Johannessen; Grete Kummen	Norway	1:11:09.08
6	Anna Pasiarová; Gabriela Svobodová-Sekajová; Alena Bartošová; Blanka Paulů	Czechoslovakia	1:11:27.83
7	Shirley Firth; Joan Groothuysen; Sue Holloway; Sharon Firth	Canada	1:14:02.72
8	Anna Pawlusiak; Anna Gębala-Duraj; Maria Trebunia; Władysława Majerczyk	Poland	1:14:13.40
9	Martha Rockwell; Jana Hlavaty; Terry Porter; Twila Hinkle	United States	1:17:58.18
