= FIS Nordic World Ski Championships 1978 =

Ski championships in Lahti, Finland

1978 FIS Nordic World Ski Championships
- Host city: Lahti
- Country: Finland
- Events: 11
- Opening: February 18, 1978
- Closing: February 26, 1978
- Main venue: Salpausselkä

Official poster for the FIS Nordic World Ski Championships 1978. (in Finnish)

The FIS Nordic World Ski Championships 1978 took place February 18–26, 1978 in Lahti, Finland. This was Lahti's record fourth time hosting the event after previously doing so in 1926, 1938, and 1958. The women's 20 km event was added.

== Men's cross-country ==
=== 15 km ===
February 21, 1978

Medal	Athlete	Time
Gold	Józef Łuszczek (POL)	49:09.37
Silver	Yevgeny Belyayev (URS)	49:11.62
Bronze	Juha Mieto (FIN)	49:14.37

=== 30 km ===
February 19, 1978

Medal	Athlete	Time
Gold	Sergey Savelyev (URS)	1:32:56.00
Silver	Nikolay Zimyatov (URS)	1:33:48.23
Bronze	Józef Łuszczek (POL)	1:33:52.21

=== 50 km ===
February 26, 1978

Medal	Athlete	Time
Gold	Sven-Åke Lundbäck (SWE)	2:46:43.06
Silver	Yevgeny Belyayev (URS)	2:47:34.48
Bronze	Jean-Paul Pierrat (FRA)	2:47:52.27

=== 4 × 10 km relay ===
February 23, 1978

Medal	Team	Time
Gold	Sweden (Sven-Åke Lundbäck, Christer Johansson, Tommy Limby, Thomas Magnuson)	2:05:17.63
Silver	Finland (Esko Lähtevänoja, Juha Mieto, Pertti Teurajärvi, Matti Pitkänen)	2:05:28.95
Bronze	Norway (Lars-Erik Eriksen, Ove Aunli, Ivar Formo, Oddvar Brå)	2:06:48.37

== Women's cross-country ==
=== 5 km ===
February 20, 1978

Medal	Athlete	Time
Gold	Helena Takalo (FIN)	18:53.50
Silver	Hilkka Riihivuori (FIN)	18:58.49
Bronze	Raisa Smetanina (URS)	19:01.30

=== 10 km ===
February 18, 1978

Medal	Athlete	Time
Gold	Zinaida Amosova (URS)	37:01.72
Silver	Raisa Smetanina (URS)	37:13.37
Bronze	Hilkka Riihivuori (FIN)	37:23.43

=== 20 km ===
February 25, 1978

Medal	Athlete	Time
Gold	Zinaida Amosova (URS)	1:13:00.85
Silver	Galina Kulakova (URS)	1:13:08.11
Bronze	Helena Takalo (FIN)	1:13:57.95

=== 4 × 5 km relay ===
February 22, 1978

Medal	Team	Time
Gold	Finland (Taina Impiö, Marja-Liisa Hämäläinen, Hilkka Riihivuori, Helena Takalo)	1:13:25.08
Silver	East Germany (Marlies Rostock, Birgit Schreiber, Barbara Petzold, Christel Meinel)	1:13:29.74
Bronze	Soviet Union (Nina Rocheva, Zinaida Amosova, Raisa Smetanina, Galina Kulakova)	1:13:39.88

== Men's Nordic combined ==
=== Individual ===
February 19–20, 1978

Medal	Athlete	Points
Gold	Konrad Winkler (GDR)	435.24
Silver	Rauno Miettinen (FIN)	431.66
Bronze	Ulrich Wehling (GDR)	430.83

== Men's ski jumping ==
=== Individual normal hill ===
February 18, 1978

Medal	Athlete	Points
Gold	Matthias Buse (GDR)	253.2
Silver	Henry Glaß (GDR)	251.7
Bronze	Aleksey Borovitin (URS)	250.0

=== Individual large hill ===
February 25, 1978

Medal	Athlete	Points
Gold	Tapio Räisänen (FIN)	256.6
Silver	Alois Lipburger (AUT)	256.3
Bronze	Falko Weißpflog (GDR)	255.8

=== Team large hill (unofficial) ===
February 22, 1978. No medals awarded.

Rank	Team	Points
1	East Germany (Harald Duschek, Jochen Danneberg, Henry Glaß, Matthias Buse)	443.8
2	Finland (Jari Puikkonen, Jouko Törmänen, Pentti Kokkonen, Tapio Räisänen)	401.0
3	Norway (Rune Hauge, Roger Ruud, Tom Levorstad, Per Bergerud)	396.6

== Medal table ==
Rank	Nation	Gold	Silver	Bronze	Total
1	Soviet Union (URS)	3	5	3	11
2	Finland (FIN)	3	3	3	9
3	East Germany (GDR)	2	2	2	6
4	Sweden (SWE)	2	0	0	2
5	Poland (POL)	1	0	1	2
6	Austria (AUT)	0	1	0	1
7	France (FRA)	0	0	1	1
7	Norway (NOR)	0	0	1	1
Totals (8 entries)		11	11	11	33
