= Alpine skiing at the 1976 Winter Olympics – Men's slalom =

Men's slalom at the XII Olympic Winter Games
- Alpine skiing
- Venue: Axamer Lizum
- Date: 14 February 1976
- Competitors: 94 from 31 nations
- Winning time: 1:44.26

Medalists
1st place, gold medalist(s)		Piero Gros	Italy
2nd place, silver medalist(s)		Gustav Thöni	Italy
3rd place, bronze medalist(s)		Willi Frommelt	Liechtenstein

Men's Slalom
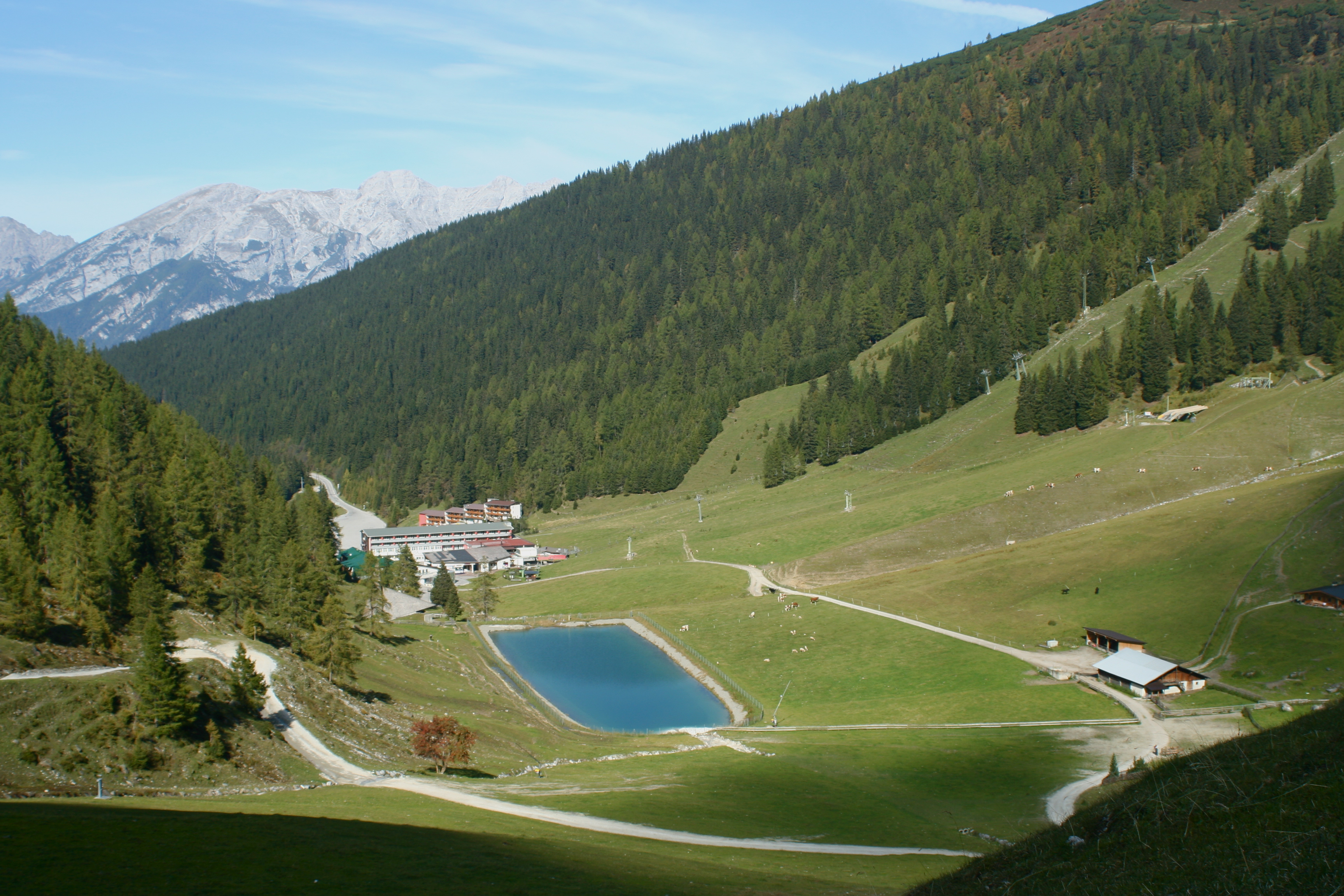
- Location: Axamer Lizum
- Vertical: 220 m (722 ft)
- Top elevation: 1,830 m (6,004 ft)
- Base elevation: 1,610 m (5,282 ft)

Location in Austria

The Men's slalom competition of the Innsbruck 1976 Olympics was held at Axamer Lizum on Saturday, 14 February.

The defending world champion was Gustav Thöni of Italy, while Sweden's Ingemar Stenmark was the defending World Cup slalom champion and the leader of the 1976 World Cup.

== Results ==
Rank	Name	Country	Run 1	Run 2	Total	Difference
1st place, gold medalist(s)	Piero Gros	Italy	1:01.23	1:02.06	2:03.29	—
2nd place, silver medalist(s)	Gustav Thöni	Italy	1:00.55	1:03.18	2:03.73	+0.44
3rd place, bronze medalist(s)	Willi Frommelt	Liechtenstein	0:59.98	1:04.30	2:04.28	+0.99
4	Walter Tresch	Switzerland	1:01.34	1:03.92	2:05.26	+1.97
5	Christian Neureuther	West Germany	1:01.70	1:04.86	2:06.56	+3.27
6	Wolfgang Junginger	West Germany	1:00.95	1:06.13	2:07.08	+3.79
7	Alois Morgenstern	Austria	1:01.61	1:05.57	2:07.18	+3.89
8	Peter Lüscher	Switzerland	1:02.76	1:05.34	2:08.10	+4.81
9	Francisco Fernández Ochoa	Spain	1:02.35	1:06.00	2:08.35	+5.06
10	Andreas Wenzel	Liechtenstein	1:02.51	1:06.22	2:08.73	+5.44
11	Jan Bachleda-Curuś	Poland	1:03.76	1:05.05	2:08.81	+5.52
12	Stig Strand	Sweden	1:03.27	1:05.81	2:09.08	+5.79
13	Cary Adgate	United States	1:03.06	1:06.47	2:09.53	+6.24
14	Miloslav Sochor	Czechoslovakia	1:03.11	1:06.50	2:09.61	+6.32
15	Roland Roche	France	1:03.53	1:06.78	2:10.31	+7.02
16	Albert Burger	West Germany	1:03.38	1:06.93	2:10.31	+7.02
17	Torsten Jakobsson	Sweden	1:04.21	1:07.03	2:11.24	+7.95
18	Phil Mahre	United States	1:04.80	1:06.97	2:11.77	+8.48
19	Greg Jones	United States	1:05.05	1:07.66	2:12.71	+9.42
20	Sepp Ferstl	West Germany	1:06.32	1:08.02	2:14.34	+11.05
21	Roman Dereziński	Poland	1:04.93	1:09.80	2:14.73	+11.44
22	Anton Steiner	Austria	1:06.02	1:08.88	2:14.90	+11.61
23	Jim Hunter	Canada	1:06.26	1:10.80	2:17.06	+13.77
24	Sigurður Jónsson	Iceland	1:07.28	1:10.06	2:17.34	+14.05
25	Vladimir Andreyev	Soviet Union	1:07.01	1:10.55	2:17.56	+14.27
26	Erik Håker	Norway	1:06.77	1:11.09	2:17.86	+14.57
27	Robert Safrata	Canada	1:07.63	1:10.35	2:17.98	+14.69
28	Ivan Penev	Bulgaria	1:07.94	1:10.25	2:18.19	+14.90
29	Sumihiro Tomii	Japan	1:07.69	1:10.98	2:18.67	+15.38
30	Ion Cavaşi	Romania	1:08.59	1:12.73	2:21.32	+18.03
31	Andrej Koželj	Yugoslavia	1:09.50	1:14.16	2:23.66	+20.37
32	Haukur Jóhannsson	Iceland	1:10.89	1:13.16	2:24.05	+20.76
33	José Luis Koifman	Chile	1:10.65	1:15.32	2:25.97	+22.68
34	Dan Cristea	Romania	1:10.70	1:16.87	2:27.57	+24.28
35	Stuart Blakely	New Zealand	1:13.17	1:15.60	2:28.77	+25.48
36	Brett Kendall	New Zealand	1:18.12	1:20.26	2:38.38	+35.09
37	Ersin Ayrłksa	Turkey	1:22.60	1:29.18	2:51.78	+48.49
38	Carlos Font	Andorra	1:24.98	1:31.54	2:56.52	+53.23
-	Franco Bieler	Italy	1:01.04	DNF	-	-
-	Ingemar Stenmark	Sweden	1:02.34	DNF	-	-
-	Masami Ichimura	Japan	1:02.35	DNF	-	-
-	Gérard Bonnevie	France	1:03.51	DNF	-	-
-	Gudmund Söderin	Sweden	1:05.60	DNF	-	-
-	Juan Angel Olivieri	Argentina	1:05.90	DNF	-	-
-	Carlos Alberto Martínez	Argentina	?	DNF	-	-
-	Stuart Fitzsimmons	Great Britain	?	DNF	-	-
-	Sashko Dikov	Bulgaria	?	DNF	-	-
-	Mohammad Kalhor	Iran	?	DNF	-	-
-	Spyros Theodorou	Greece	DNF	-	-	-
-	Murat Tosun	Turkey	DNF	-	-	-
-	David Griff	Australia	DNF	-	-	-
-	Maurizio Battistini	San Marino	DNF	-	-	-
-	Ahmet Kıbıl	Turkey	DNF	-	-	-
-	Chen Yun-Ming	Republic of China	DNF	-	-	-
-	Robin Armstrong	New Zealand	DNF	-	-	-
-	Thomas Karadimas	Greece	DNF	-	-	-
-	Kim Clifford	Australia	DNF	-	-	-
-	Gorban Ali Kalhor	Iran	DNF	-	-	-
-	Xavier Areny	Andorra	DNF	-	-	-
-	Tómas Leifsson	Iceland	DNF	-	-	-
-	Walter Dei Vecchi	Argentina	DNF	-	-	-
-	Rafael Cañas	Chile	DNF	-	-	-
-	Ajdin Pašović	Yugoslavia	DNF	-	-	-
-	Didier Xhaet	Belgium	DNF	-	-	-
-	Federico García	Chile	DNF	-	-	-
-	Robert Blanchaer	Belgium	DNF	-	-	-
-	Antoine Crespo	Andorra	DNF	-	-	-
-	Konrad Bartelski	Great Britain	DNF	-	-	-
-	Jaime Ros	Spain	DNF	-	-	-
-	Ken Read	Canada	DNF	-	-	-
-	Georgi Kochov	Bulgaria	DNF	-	-	-
-	Mikio Katagiri	Japan	DNF	-	-	-
-	Peter Fuchs	Great Britain	DNF	-	-	-
-	Antoni Naudi	Andorra	DNF	-	-	-
-	Roberto Koifman	Chile	DNF	-	-	-
-	Miran Gašperšič	Yugoslavia	DNF	-	-	-
-	Juan Manuel Fernández Ochoa	Spain	DNF	-	-	-
-	Dave Murray	Canada	DNF	-	-	-
-	Jorge García	Spain	DNF	-	-	-
-	Luis Rosenkjer	Argentina	DNF	-	-	-
-	Haruhisa Chiba	Japan	DNF	-	-	-
-	Bojan Križaj	Yugoslavia	DNF	-	-	-
-	Bohumír Zeman	Czechoslovakia	DNF	-	-	-
-	Odd Sørli	Norway	DNF	-	-	-
-	Heini Hemmi	Switzerland	DNF	-	-	-
-	Ernst Good	Switzerland	DNF	-	-	-
-	Philippe Hardy	France	DNF	-	-	-
-	Claude Perrot	France	DNF	-	-	-
-	Hansi Hinterseer	Austria	DNF	-	-	-
-	Fausto Radici	Italy	DNF	-	-	-
-	Geoff Bruce	United States	DNF	-	-	-
-	Alan Stewart	Great Britain	DQ	-	-	-
-	Akbar Kalili	Iran	DQ	-	-	-
-	Mohammad Hadj Kia Shemshaki	Iran	DQ	-	-	-
