= Alpine skiing at the 1976 Winter Olympics – Men's downhill =

Men's downhill at the XII Olympic Winter Games
- Alpine skiing
- Venue: Patscherkofel; Tyrol, Austria
- Date: 5 February 1976
- Competitors: 74 from 27 nations
- Winning time: 1:45.73

Medalists
1st place, gold medalist(s)		Franz Klammer	Austria
2nd place, silver medalist(s)		Bernhard Russi	Switzerland
3rd place, bronze medalist(s)		Herbert Plank	Italy

Men's Downhill
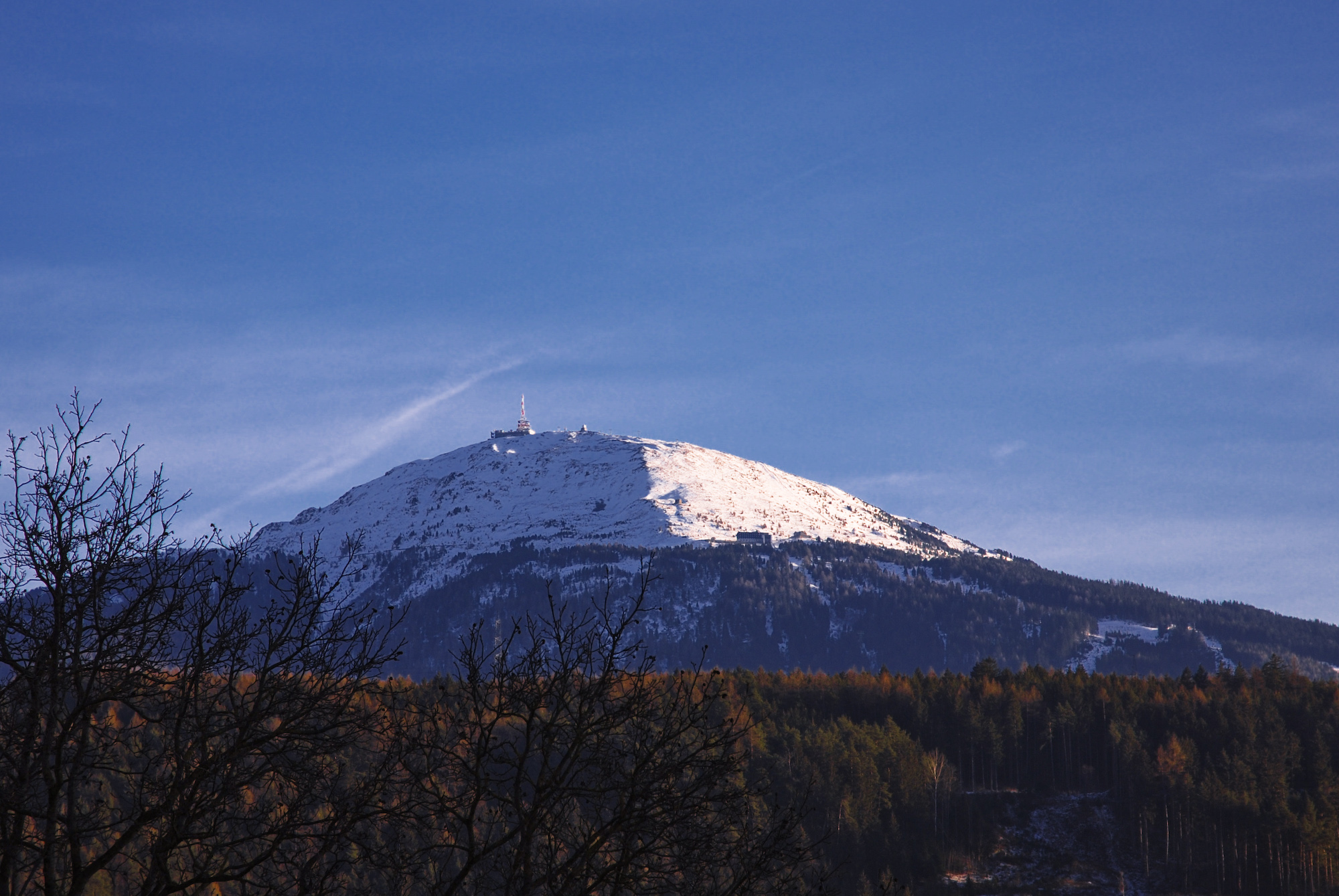
- Location: Patscherkofel
- Vertical: 870 m (2,854 ft)
- Top elevation: 1,950 m (6,398 ft)
- Base elevation: 1,080 m (3,543 ft)
- Longest run: 3,020 m (1.88 mi)

Location in Austria

The Men's Downhill competition of the 1976 Winter Olympics at Innsbruck, Austria, was held at Patscherkofel on Thursday, 5 February, on the same course as in 1964.

The defending world champion, David Zwilling of Austria, had recently retired; Bernhard Russi of Switzerland was the defending Olympic champion. Franz Klammer of Austria was the defending World Cup downhill champion and led the current season; he had also won the pre-Olympic World Cup downhill at Patcherkofel a year earlier in January 1975.

Klammer won the gold medal, Russi took the silver, and Herbert Plank of Italy was the bronze medalist.

The starting gate was at an elevation of 1,950 m (6,398 ft) above sea level, with a vertical drop of 870 m (2,854 ft). The course length was 3.020 km (1.88 mi) for an average gradient of 28.8% (16.1 degrees). Klammer's famous winning run resulted in an average speed of 102.828 km/h (63.9 mph), with an average vertical descent rate of 8.2285 m/s (27.0 ft/s), significantly faster than previous Olympic downhills. At age 22, the win elevated him to an international celebrity and he was featured on the cover of Sports Illustrated.

Egon Zimmermann, also of Austria, took the gold medal a dozen years earlier in the 1964 Olympic downhill; at 2:18.16, his winning time was more than a half-minute behind Klammer's.

Through 2026, no Olympic men's downhill champion has repeated; Russi remains the sole defender to medal.

== Results ==
Rank	Bib	Name	Country	Time	Difference
1st place, gold medalist(s)	15	Franz Klammer	Austria	1:45.73	—
2nd place, silver medalist(s)	3	Bernhard Russi	Switzerland	1:46.06	+0.33
3rd place, bronze medalist(s)	8	Herbert Plank	Italy	1:46.59	+0.86
4	11	Philippe Roux	Switzerland	1:46.69	+0.96
5	10	Ken Read	Canada	1:46.83	+1.10
6	19	Andy Mill	United States	1:47.06	+1.33
7	29	Walter Tresch	Switzerland	1:47.29	+1.56
8	13	Dave Irwin	Canada	1:47.41	+1.68
9	6	Sepp Walcher	Austria	1:47.45	+1.72
10	5	Jim Hunter	Canada	1:47.52	+1.79
11	30	Greg Jones	United States	1:47.84	+2.11
12	1	René Berthod	Switzerland	1:47.89	+2.16
13	22	Pete Patterson	United States	1:47.94	+2.21
14	21	Rolando Thoeni	Italy	1:48.13	+2.40
15	20	Peter Fischer	West Germany	1:48.18	+2.45
16	24	Patrice Pellat-Finet	France	1:48.34	+2.61
17	25	Sepp Ferstl	West Germany	1:48.41	+2.68
18	28	Dave Murray	Canada	1:48.43	+2.70
19	4	Klaus Eberhard	Austria	1:48.45	+2.72
20	42	Sumihiro Tomii	Japan	1:48.88	+3.15
21	16	Willi Frommelt	Liechtenstein	1:48.92	+3.19
22	31	David Griff	Australia	1:49.02	+3.29
22	2	Michael Veith	West Germany	1:49.02	+3.29
24	27	Karl Anderson	United States	1:49.08	+3.35
25	9	Erik Håker	Norway	1:49.19	+3.46
26	14	Gustavo Thoeni	Italy	1:49.25	+3.52
27	18	Mikio Katagiri	Japan	1:50.03	+4.30
28	38	Andreas Wenzel	Liechtenstein	1:50.08	+4.35
29	46	Wolfgang Junginger	West Germany	1:50.48	+4.75
30	37	Alan Stewart	Great Britain	1:50.56	+4.83
31	44	Luis Rosenkjer	Argentina	1:50.87	+5.14
32	34	Stuart Fitzsimmons	Great Britain	1:50.89	+5.16
33	45	Bohumír Zeman	Czechoslovakia	1:51.27	+5.54
34	35	Kim Clifford	Australia	1:51.64	+5.91
35	17	Francisco Fernández Ochoa	Spain	1:51.91	+6.18
36	36	Juan Manuel Fernández Ochoa	Spain	1:52.40	+6.67
37	43	Andrej Koželj	Yugoslavia	1:52.75	+7.02
37	33	Peter Fuchs	Great Britain	1:52.75	+7.02
39	39	Juan Angel Olivieri	Argentina	1:52.76	+7.03
40	55	Miloslav Sochor	Czechoslovakia	1:53.48	+7.75
41	32	Jaime Ros	Spain	1:53.50	+7.77
42	59	Jorge García	Spain	1:53.55	+7.82
43	58	Didier Xhaet	Belgium	1:53.56	+7.83
44	49	Vladimir Andreyev	Soviet Union	1:53.61	+7.88
45	41	Robert Blanchaer	Belgium	1:54.30	+8.57
46	40	Ajdin Pašović	Yugoslavia	1:54.57	+8.84
47	54	Carlos Alberto Martínez	Argentina	1:54.62	+8.89
48	56	Ivan Penev	Bulgaria	1:55.56	+9.83
49	74	Dan Cristea	Romania	1:55.63	+9.90
50	70	Georgi Kochov	Bulgaria	1:55.82	+10.09
51	47	José Luis Koifman	Chile	1:56.30	+10.57
52	50	Roman Dereziński	Poland	1:56.33	+10.60
53	67	Stuart Blakely	New Zealand	1:57.91	+12.18
54	52	Antoine Crespo	Andorra	1:58.72	+12.99
55	53	Gorban Ali Kalhor	Iran	1:59.15	+13.42
56	62	Mohammad Hadj Kia Shemshaki	Iran	1:59.44	+13.71
57	68	Ion Cavași	Romania	2:00.19	+14.46
58	61	Akbar Kalili	Iran	2:00.32	+14.59
59	75	Rafael Cañas	Chile	2:00.39	+14.66
60	69	Brett Kendall	New Zealand	2:00.57	+14.84
61	63	Fernando Reutter	Chile	2:01.19	+15.46
62	64	Carlos Font	Andorra	2:01.75	+16.02
63	65	Ahmet Kıbıl	Turkey	2:03.74	+18.01
64	73	Mümtaz Demirhan	Turkey	2:06.01	+20.28
65	71	Thomas Karadimas	Greece	2:14.69	+28.96
66	66	Spyros Theodorou	Greece	2:17.08	+31.35
-	60	Robin Armstrong	New Zealand	DNF	-
-	57	Mohammad Kalhor	Iran	DNF	-
-	51	Xavier Areny	Andorra	DNF	-
-	48	Adrián Roncallo	Argentina	DNF	-
-	26	Konrad Bartelski	Great Britain	DNF	-
-	23	Rob McIntyre	Australia	DNF	-
-	12	Anton Steiner	Austria	DNF	-
-	7	Erwin Stricker	Italy	DNF	-
-	72	Murat Tosun	Turkey	DNS	-
