= Bulgaria at the 1976 Winter Olympics =

- Flag of Bulgaria
- IOC code: BUL
- NOC: Bulgarian Olympic Committee
- Website: www.bgolympic.org (in Bulgarian and English)

in Innsbruck
- Competitors: 29 in 4 sports
- Medals: Gold 0 Silver 0 Bronze 0 Total 0

Winter Olympics appearances (overview)
- 1936; 1948; 1952; 1956; 1960; 1964; 1968; 1972; 1976; 1980; 1984; 1988; 1992; 1994; 1998; 2002; 2006; 2010; 2014; 2018; 2022; 2026

Bulgaria competed at the 1976 Winter Olympics in Innsbruck, Austria. It did not earn any medals.

== Alpine skiing ==
Men

Athlete	Event	Race 1		Race 2		Total	
Athlete	Event	Time	Rank	Time	Rank	Time	Rank
Georgi Kochov	Downhill					1:55.82	50
Ivan Penev	Downhill					1:55.86	48
Vladimir Drazhev	Giant Slalom	1:55.73	50	DNF	–	DNF	–
Georgi Kochov	Giant Slalom	1:54.86	47	DNF	–	DNF	–
Ivan Penev	Giant Slalom	1:51.59	35	1:52.51	30	3:44.10	31
Petar Popangelov	Giant Slalom	1:50.68	32	1:48.36	23	3:39.04	26
Georgi Kochov	Slalom	DNF	–	–	–	DNF	–
Sashko Dikov	Slalom	n/a	?	DNF	–	DNF	–
Ivan Penev	Slalom	1:07.94	35	1:10.25	24	2:18.19	28

== Biathlon ==
Men

Event	Athlete	Time	Penalties	Adjusted time ^{1}	Rank
20 km	Iliya Todorov	1'20:57.60	7	1'27:57.60	43
20 km	Khristo Madzharov	1'18:02.62	7	1'25:02.62	32

^{1} One minute added per close miss (a hit in the outer ring), two minutes added per complete miss.

== Cross-country skiing ==
Men

Event	Athlete	Race	
Event	Athlete	Time	Rank
15 km	Khristo Barzanov	50:08.09	60
15 km	Petar Pankov	48:08.46	41
15 km	Lyubomir Toskov	47:04.87	26
15 km	Ivan Lebanov	47:02.41	24
30 km	Khristo Barzanov	1'41:05.91	53
30 km	Petar Pankov	1'39:27.77	49
30 km	Lyubomir Toskov	1'39:10.94	48
50 km	Petar Pankov	2'57:07.93	40
50 km	Lyubomir Toskov	2'55:11.11	39

Men's 4 × 10 km relay

Athletes	Race	
Athletes	Time	Rank
Lyubomir Toskov; Ivan Lebanov; Khristo Barzanov; Petar Pankov	2'19:45.66	14

== Ice hockey ==
=== First round ===
Winners (in bold) entered the Medal Round. Other teams played a consolation round for 7th-12th places.

Team 1	Score	Team 2
**Czechoslovakia**	14–1	Bulgaria

=== Consolation round ===
Rank		Pld	W	L	T	GF	GA	Pts
7	Romania	5	4	1	0	23	15	8
8	Austria	5	3	2	0	18	14	6
9	Japan	5	3	2	0	20	18	6
10	Yugoslavia	5	3	2	0	22	19	6
11	Switzerland	5	2	3	0	24	22	4
12	Bulgaria	5	0	5	0	19	38	0

- Austria 6-2 Bulgaria
- Switzerland 8-3 Bulgaria
- Yugoslavia 8-5 Bulgaria
- Romania 9-4 Bulgaria
- Japan 7-5 Bulgaria

**Contestants**; Petar Radev; Atanas Iliev; Ivan Markovski; Nikolay Petrov; Dimo Krastinov; Dimitri Lazarov; Ivan Penelov; Georgi Iliev; Ivaylo Kalev; Lyubomir Lyubomirov; Iliya Bachvarov; Bozhidar Minchev; Milcho Nenov; Ivan Atanasov; Kiril Gerasimov; Marin Bachvarov; Malin Atanasov; Nikolay Mikhaylov
