= Alpine skiing at the 1976 Winter Olympics – Men's giant slalom =

Men's giant slalom at the XII Olympic Winter Games
- Alpine skiing
- Venue: Axamer Lizum
- Date: 9–10 February 1976
- Competitors: 97 from 31 nations
- Winning time: 3:26.97

Medalists
1st place, gold medalist(s)		Heini Hemmi	Switzerland
2nd place, silver medalist(s)		Ernst Good	Switzerland
3rd place, bronze medalist(s)		Ingemar Stenmark	Sweden

Men's Giant Slalom
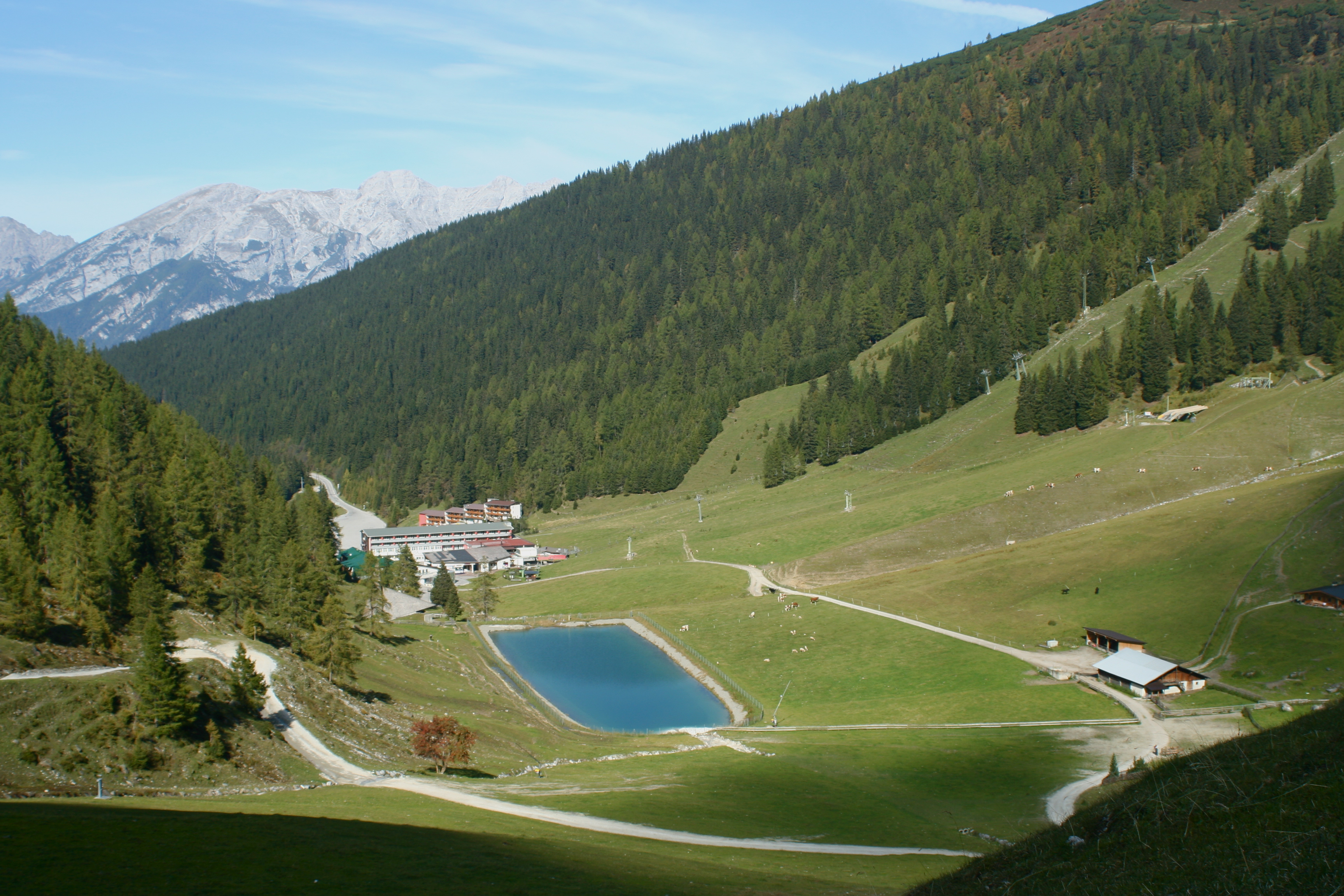
- Location: Axamer Lizum
- Vertical: 450 m (1,476 ft); 425 m (1,394 ft)
- Top elevation: 1,990 m (6,529 ft); 2,035 m (6,677 ft)
- Base elevation: 1,540 m (5,052 ft); 1,610 m (5,282 ft)

Location in Austria

The Men's giant slalom competition of the Innsbruck 1976 Olympics was held at Axamer Lizum.

The defending world champion was Gustavo Thoeni of Italy and led the 1976 World Cup, while Sweden's Ingemar Stenmark was the defending World Cup giant slalom champion.

== Results ==
Rank	Name	Country	Run 1	Run 2	Total	Difference
1st place, gold medalist(s)	Heini Hemmi	Switzerland	1:45.41	1:41.56	3:26.97	—
2nd place, silver medalist(s)	Ernst Good	Switzerland	1:44.60	1:42.57	3:27.17	+0.20
3rd place, bronze medalist(s)	Ingemar Stenmark	Sweden	1:46.51	1:40.90	3:27.41	+0.44
4	Gustavo Thoeni	Italy	1:44.19	1:43.48	3:27.67	+0.70
5	Phil Mahre	United States	1:45.58	1:42.62	3:28.20	+1.23
6	Engelhard Pargätzi	Switzerland	1:46.16	1:42.60	3:28.76	+1.79
7	Fausto Radici	Italy	1:46.87	1:43.22	3:30.09	+3.12
8	Franco Bieler	Italy	1:47.00	1:43.24	3:30.24	+3.27
9	Greg Jones	United States	1:48.09	1:43.68	3:31.77	+4.80
10	Albert Burger	West Germany	1:47.32	1:45.36	3:32.68	+5.71
11	Miloslav Sochor	Czechoslovakia	1:47.46	1:46.07	3:33.53	+6.56
12	Stig Strand	Sweden	1:48.63	1:45.03	3:33.66	+6.69
13	Steve Mahre	United States	1:47.80	1:45.96	3:33.76	+6.79
14	Hansi Hinterseer	Austria	1:46.46	1:47.34	3:33.80	+6.83
15	Alain Navillod	France	1:47.15	1:47.18	3:34.33	+7.36
16	Juan Manuel Fernández Ochoa	Spain	1:48.06	1:46.71	3:34.77	+7.80
17	Willi Frommelt	Liechtenstein	1:48.44	1:47.27	3:35.71	+8.74
18	Bojan Križaj	Yugoslavia	1:49.08	1:46.82	3:35.90	+8.93
19	Wolfgang Junginger	West Germany	1:49.79	1:46.23	3:36.02	+9.05
20	Andreas Wenzel	Liechtenstein	1:48.53	1:47.72	3:36.25	+9.28
21	Cary Adgate	United States	1:48.64	1:47.77	3:36.41	+9.44
22	Jim Hunter	Canada	1:48.56	1:48.80	3:37.36	+10.39
23	Bohumír Zeman	Czechoslovakia	1:49.10	1:48.46	3:37.56	+10.59
24	Francisco Fernández Ochoa	Spain	1:48.65	1:49.47	3:38.12	+11.15
25	Philippe Barroso	France	1:50.23	1:48.26	3:38.49	+11.52
26	Petar Popangelov	Bulgaria	1:50.68	1:48.36	3:39.04	+12.07
27	Philippe Hardy	France	1:51.20	1:49.23	3:40.43	+13.46
28	Sepp Ferstl	West Germany	1:49.98	1:51.54	3:41.52	+14.55
29	Claude Perrot	France	1:49.48	1:53.36	3:42.84	+15.87
30	Christian Neureuther	West Germany	1:52.29	1:51.73	3:44.02	+17.05
31	Ivan Penev	Bulgaria	1:51.59	1:52.51	3:44.10	+17.13
32	Luis Rosenkjer	Argentina	1:53.98	1:54.18	3:48.16	+21.19
33	Alan Stewart	Great Britain	1:54.49	1:55.15	3:49.64	+22.67
34	Sumihiro Tomii	Japan	1:53.92	1:55.81	3:49.73	+22.76
35	Andrej Koželj	Yugoslavia	1:54.43	1:56.05	3:50.48	+23.51
36	Jaime Ros	Spain	1:55.25	1:56.54	3:51.79	+24.82
37	Mikio Katagiri	Japan	1:54.68	1:58.05	3:52.73	+25.76
38	Roman Dereziński	Poland	1:55.44	1:58.27	3:53.71	+26.74
39	Sigurður Jónsson	Iceland	1:58.46	1:57.76	3:56.22	+29.25
40	Robert Blanchaer	Belgium	1:57.37	2:00.53	3:57.90	+30.93
41	Roberto Koifman	Chile	1:58.15	2:01.34	3:59.49	+32.52
42	Adrián Roncallo	Argentina	2:00.16	2:00.46	4:00.62	+33.65
43	José Luis Koifman	Chile	1:58.93	2:02.42	4:01.35	+34.38
44	Brett Kendall	New Zealand	2:01.82	2:02.23	4:04.05	+37.08
45	Dan Cristea	Romania	2:01.78	2:03.51	4:05.29	+38.32
46	Tómas Leifsson	Iceland	2:01.83	2:03.54	4:05.37	+38.40
47	Gorban Ali Kalhor	Iran	2:02.30	2:06.65	4:08.95	+41.98
48	Carlos Font	Andorra	2:11.03	2:14.62	4:25.65	+58.68
49	Spyros Theodorou	Greece	2:12.79	2:16.29	4:29.08	+62.11
50	Thomas Karadimas	Greece	2:19.06	2:34.57	4:53.63	+86.66
51	Giorgio Cecchetti	San Marino	2:37.15	2:41.02	5:18.17	+111.20
52	Chen Yun-Ming	Republic of China	2:39.82	2:43.26	5:23.08	+116.11
-	Piero Gros	Italy	1:45.69	DNF	-	-
-	Torsten Jakobsson	Sweden	1:48.26	DNF	-	-
-	Alois Morgenstern	Austria	1:48.33	DNF	-	-
-	Walter Tresch	Switzerland	1:49.26	DNF	-	-
-	Gudmund Söderin	Sweden	1:50.94	DNF	-	-
-	Robert Safrata	Canada	1:51.70	DNF	-	-
-	Paul Frommelt	Liechtenstein	1:52.69	DNF	-	-
-	Ken Read	Canada	1:52.81	DNF	-	-
-	Dave Murray	Canada	1:54.43	DNF	-	-
-	Ajdin Pašović	Yugoslavia	1:54.82	DNF	-	-
-	Georgi Kochov	Bulgaria	1:54.86	DNF	-	-
-	Vladimir Drazhev	Bulgaria	1:55.73	DNF	-	-
-	Stuart Fitzsimmons	Great Britain	1:55.77	DNF	-	-
-	Carlos Alberto Martínez	Argentina	1:56.03	DNF	-	-
-	Kim Clifford	Australia	1:56.66	DQ	-	-
-	Peter Fuchs	Great Britain	1:56.94	DNF	-	-
-	Antoine Crespo	Andorra	1:59.59	DNF	-	-
-	Ion Cavaşi	Romania	1:59.90	DNS	-	-
-	Mohammad Kalhor	Iran	1:59.95	DNF	-	-
-	Juan Angel Olivieri	Argentina	2:01.08	DNF	-	-
-	Haukur Jóhannsson	Iceland	2:01.76	DNF	-	-
-	Stuart Blakely	New Zealand	2:02.12	DNF	-	-
-	Akbar Kalili	Iran	2:02.98	DQ	-	-
-	Rafael Cañas	Chile	2:03.65	DNF	-	-
-	Esteve Tomas	Andorra	2:04.63	DNF	-	-
-	Árni Óðinsson	Iceland	2:05.28	DNF	-	-
-	Xavier Areny	Andorra	2:05.86	DNF	-	-
-	Federico García	Chile	2:06.99	DNF	-	-
-	Mümtaz Demirhan	Turkey	2:17.58	DNF	-	-
-	Murat Tosun	Turkey	2:17.99	DNF	-	-
-	Maurizio Battistini	San Marino	2:33.33	DNF	-	-
-	Robin Armstrong	New Zealand	DNF	-	-	-
-	Ersin Ayrłksa	Turkey	DNF	-	-	-
-	Ahmet Kıbıl	Turkey	DNF	-	-	-
-	Mohammad Hadj Kia Shemshaki	Iran	DNF	-	-	-
-	Didier Xhaet	Belgium	DNF	-	-	-
-	Konrad Bartelski	Great Britain	DNF	-	-	-
-	Vladimir Andreyev	Soviet Union	DNF	-	-	-
-	Miran Gašperšič	Yugoslavia	DNF	-	-	-
-	Masami Ichimura	Japan	DNF	-	-	-
-	Odd Sørli	Norway	DNF	-	-	-
-	Franz Klammer	Austria	DNF	-	-	-
-	Erik Håker	Norway	DNF	-	-	-
-	Thomas Hauser	Austria	DNF	-	-	-
-	Haruhisa Chiba	Japan	DQ	-	-	-
