= List of Olympic men's ice hockey players for Bulgaria =

The list of Olympic men's ice hockey players for Bulgaria consists of 16 skaters and 2 goaltenders. Men's ice hockey tournaments have been staged at the Olympic Games since 1920 (it was introduced at the 1920 Summer Olympics, and was permanently added to the Winter Olympic Games in 1924). Bulgaria has participated in one tournament, the 1976 Winter Olympics, where they finished last of the twelve nations competing.

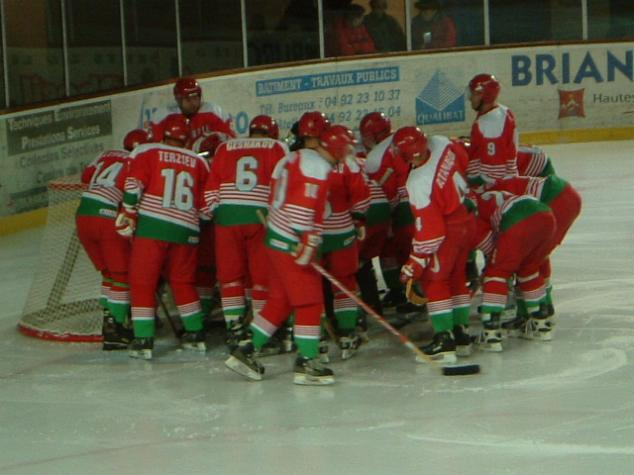
The Bulgarian national team during a qualification match for the 2006 Winter Olympics in 2004.

Milcho Nenov scored the most goals (4) and tied with three other players for the most assists (2). Nenov also had the most points (6).

== Key ==
General terms
Term	Definition
GP	Games played
Ref(s)	Reference(s)

Goaltender statistical abbreviations
Abbreviation	Definition
W	Wins
L	Losses
T	Ties
Min	Minutes played
SO	Shutouts
GA	Goals against
GAA	Goals against average

Skater statistical abbreviations
Abbreviation	Definition
G	Goals
A	Assists
P	Points
PIM	Penalty minutes

== Goaltenders ==
Goaltenders
Player	GP	W	L	T	Min	SO	GA	GAA	Ref(s)
Atanas Iliev	4	–	–	–	–	–	–	–	
Petar Radev	6	–	–	–	–	–	–	–	

== Skaters ==
Skaters
Player	GP	G	A	P	PIM	Ref(s)
Ivan Atanasov	6	2	1	3	4	
Malin Atanasov	6	0	0	0	2	
Iliya Bachvarov	6	4	1	5	14	
Marin Bachvarov	6	1	0	1	0	
Kiril Gerasimov	6	2	2	4	0	
Georgi Iliev	6	1	0	1	6	
Ivaylo Kalev	6	1	2	3	4	
Dimo Krastinov	6	0	2	2	4	
Dimitri Lazarov	6	0	0	0	0	
Lyubomir Lyubomirov	6	1	0	1	18	
Ivan Markovski	5	0	0	0	4	
Nikolay Mikhaylov	4	1	1	2	4	
Bozhidar Minchev	6	2	1	3	0	
Milcho Nenov	6	4	2	6	2	
Ivan Penelov	6	1	1	2	0	
Nikolay Petrov	6	1	0	1	4	

== See also ==
- Bulgaria men's national ice hockey team
