= List of skiers awarded Stora grabbars och tjejers märke =

Stora grabbars och tjejers märke (lit. 'Big Boys' and Girls' Badge') or Skidåkarnas hederstecken (lit. 'The skiers' decoration') is an honorary award in Swedish skiing, awarded by the Swedish Ski Association. Stora grabbars och tjejers märke are honorary awards within several Swedish sports, first named in 1928 by Bo Ekelund. To be awarded, a sportsperson has to gather a certain number of points in international (and sometimes national events) according to different rules depending on the sport in question. The recipients are called a 'Stor grabb' (lit. 'Big Boy'). When women gain the title, the recipient is called a 'Stor tjej' (lit. 'Big Girl').

== Background ==
The skiers' stor grabb was introduced in 1932. According to Nordisk familjeboks sportlexikon: uppslagsverk för sport, gymnastik och friluftsliv in the 1940s, the skiers' stor grabb was the hardest one to obtain after the wrestlers' as it needed wins in at least one major international competition, i.e. the Olympic Games, a skiing world championship, the Holmenkollen Ski Festival, or the Lahti Ski Games, and exceptional national results.

50 points are needed to obtain the badge in alpine skiing and cross-country skiing; 40 points are needed in freestyle skiing, mogul skiing, roller skiing, ski cross, ski jumping, snowboarding, and 30 points are needed in grass skiing, speed skiing, and telemark skiing. Each different event and result gives different numbers of points e.g., in alpine skiing and cross-country skiing, 50 points for an individual Olympic, FIS Alpine World Ski Championships, or FIS Nordic World Ski Championships gold medal, 40 points for a silver medal in said events, three points for an individual Swedish Alpine Skiing Championships or Swedish Cross-Country Skiing Championships title, four points for an individual FIS Alpine Ski World Cup or FIS Cross-Country World Cup win, and one point for a world cup relay appearance.

As of 2025, 202 skiers have been awarded.

== Recipients ==
As of 16 January 2025:

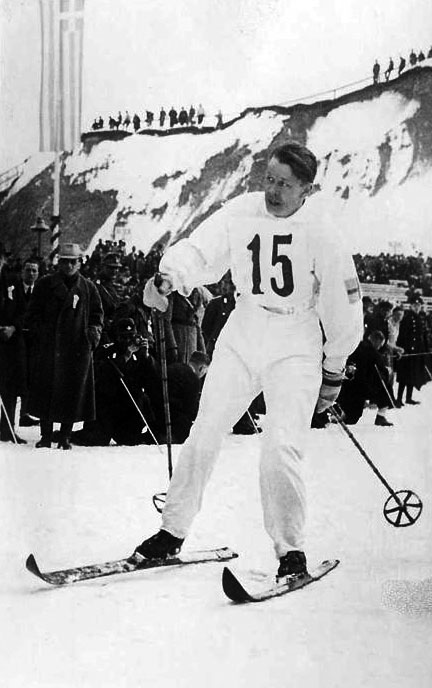
Nils-Joel Englund was awarded Stor grabb number 7.

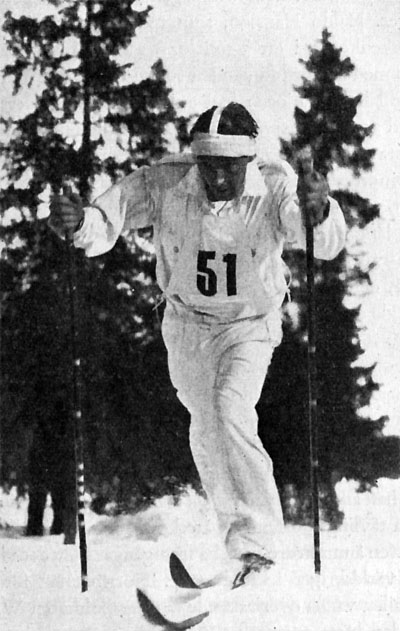
Arthur Häggblad was awarded Stor grabb number 13.

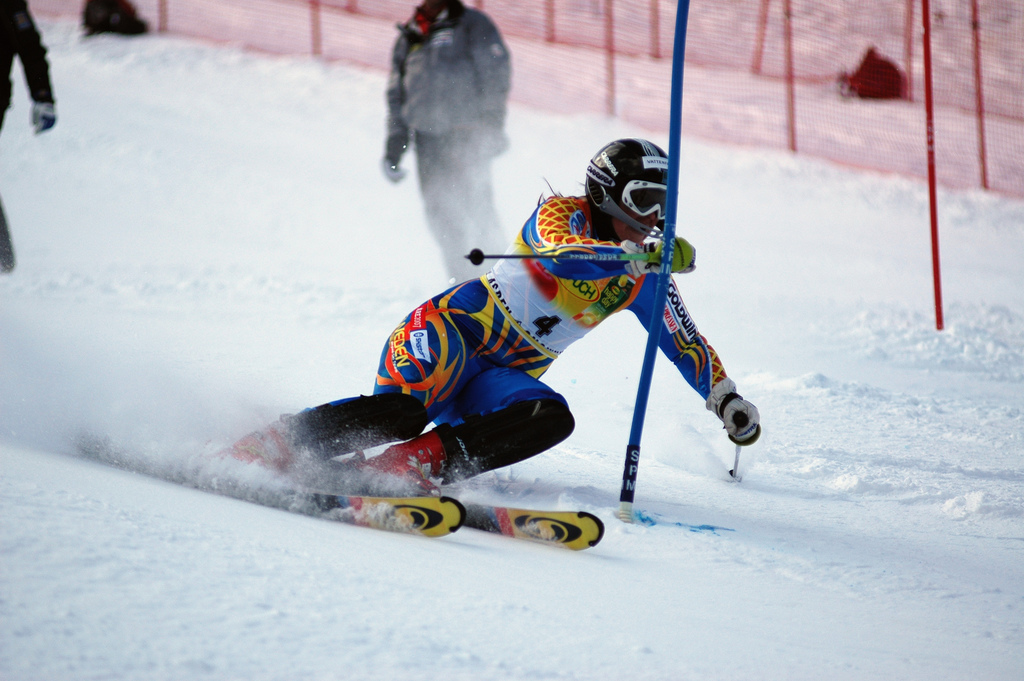
Anja Pärson was awarded Stor tjej number 123.

No	Athlete	Year	Club	Discipline(s)
1	Oscar Bomgren	1933	Djurgårdens IF	
2	Sven Eriksson	1933	Selånger SK	
3	Per-Erik Hedlund	1933	Särna SK	
4	John Lindgren	1933	Lycksele IF	
5	Einar Olsson	1933	Djurgårdens IF	
6	Sven Utterström	1933	Bodens BK	
7	Nils-Joel Englund	1936	Bodens BK	
8	Erik Larsson	1936	IFK Kiruna	
9	Elis Wiklund	1936	Kramfors IF	
10	Axel Wikström	1936	Skellefteå AIK	
11	Martin Matsbo	1937	Hudiksvalls IF	
12	Alfred Dahlqvist	1942	Östersunds SK	
13	Arthur Häggblad	1943	IFK Umeå	
14	Nils Karlsson	1947	IFK Mora	
15	May Nilsson	1947	Åre SLK	
16	Harald Eriksson	1948	IFK Umeå	
17	Hans Hansson	1948	Åre SLK	
18	Harald Hedjerson	1948	Djurgårdens IF	
19	Sven Israelsson	1948	Dala-Järna IK	
20	Martin Lundström	1948	IFK Umeå	
21	John Westbergh	1948	Anundsjö IF	
22	Nils Östensson	1948	Sälens IF	
23	Hjalmar Bergström	1949	Sandvik IF	
24	Sarah Thomasson	1950	Åre SLK	
25	Olle Dalman	1951	Leksands SLK	
26	Märta Norberg	1951	Vårby IK	
27	Margit Albrechtsson	1951	Selånger SK	
28	Karl Holmström	1952	IFK Kiruna	
29	Enar Josefsson	1952	Skellefteå SK	
30	Thure Lindgren	1952	IFK Kiruna	
31	Nils Täpp	1952	Östersunds SK	
32	Stig Sollander	1955	Östersund-Frösö SLK	
33	Sonja Edström	1956	Luleå SK	
34	Bengt Eriksson	1956	IF Friska Viljor	
35	Sixten Jernberg	1956	Lima IF	
36	Bror Östman	1956	IF Friska Viljor	
37	Per-Erik Larsson	1957	Oxbergs IF	
38	Åke Nilsson	1957	Östersund-Frösö SLK	
39	Anna-Lisa Eriksson	1960	Selånger SK	
40	Vivi-Anne Wassdahl	1961	IF Friska Viljor	
41	Lars Dahlqvist	1962	Njurunda IK	
42	Sture Grahn	1962	Lycksele IF	
43	Lennart Larsson	1962	SK Järven	
44	Assar Rönnlund	1962	IFK Umeå	
45	Ingrid Englund	1963	Sundsvalls SLK	
46	Toini Gustafsson	1963	IFK Likenäs	
47	Gunnar Karlsson	1963	IFK Umeå	
48	Hans Olofsson	1963	Tärna IK Fjällvinden	
49	Nils Sahr	1963	IK Jarl	
50	Östen Sahr	1963	IK Jarl	
51	Ragnar Persson	1964	Föllinge IK	
52	Janne Stefansson	1964	Sälens IF	
53	Barbro Martinsson	1964	Skellefteå SK	
54	Britt Strandberg	1964	Edsbyns IF	
55	Bengt-Erik Grahn	1965	Tärna IK Fjällvinden	
56	Kjell Sjöberg	1966	IF Friska Viljor	
57	Olle Rolén	1967	Åre SLK	
58	Rune Lindström	1968	Sollefteå AK	
59	Pontus Carlsson	1969	Mullsjö SOK	
60	Kurt Elimä	1969	IFK Kiruna	
61	Stefan Persson	1971	Rehns BK	
62	Bjarne Andersson	1972	IFK Mora	
63	Thomas Magnuson	1974	Delsbo IF	
64	Ingemar Stenmark	1974	Tärna IK Fjällvinden	
65	Lars-Göran Åslund	1974	Åsarna IK	
66	Lars-Ivar Svensson	1975	Rehns BK	
67	Jerker Axelsson	1976	SoIK Hellas	
68	Marianne Bogestedt	1976	Hammarby IF	
69	Sven-Åke Lundbäck	1976	Bergnäsets AIK	
70	Eva Olsson	1976	Delsbo IF	
71	Susanne Lindgren	1977	IK Hakarpspojkarna	
72	Karin Sundberg	1978	Lycksele IF	
73	Jill Wahlqvist	1978	Sunne AK	
74	Thomas Wassberg	1980	Åsarna IK	
75	Jan-Erik Thorn	1980	Eds SK	
76	Ann Melander	1981	Täby SLK	
77	Stig Strand	1981	Groko Alpina SK	
78	Thomas Eriksson	1982	Domnarvets GoIF	
79	Marie Johansson	1982	Ludvika FFI	
80	Arja Hannus	1982	Kovlands IF	
81	Lena Carlzon-Lundbäck	1982	Malmbergets AIF	
82	Bengt Fjällberg	1984	Tärna IK Fjällvinden	
83	Lars-Göran Halvarsson	1984	Särna SK	
84	Ann Larsson	1984	Kovlands IF	
85	Jan Ottosson	1984	Åsarna IK	
86	Gunde Svan	1984	Dala-Järna IK	
87	Lars Fahlén	1985	Snölyftet	
88	Madeleine Uvhagen	1985	Snölyftet	
89	Susanna Antonsson	1986	Västerås FC	
90	Carin Hernskog	1986	Västerås FC	
91	Ulla Klingström	1986	IFK Mora	
92	Torgny Mogren	1986	Åsarna IK	
93	Jonas Nilsson	1986	Sälens IF	
94	Johan Wallner	1986	Filipstads SLK	
95	Monica Äijä	1986	Gällivare SK	
96	Henrik Oskarsson	1986	Umeå-Holmsunds SK	
97	Camilla Nilsson	1988	Östersund-Frösö SLK	
98	Marie-Helene Westin	1988	Sollefteå SK	
99	Jan Boklöv	1989	Koskullskulle AIF	
100	Christer Majbäck	1990	Jukkasjärvi IF	
101	Anders Björkman	1990	Årsunda IF	
102	Lars-Börje Eriksson	1991	Åre SLK	
103	Pernilla Wiberg	1992	Norrköpings SK	
104	Annika Zell	1992	Sundsvalls OK	
105	Kristina Andersson	1993	Östersund-Frösö SLK	
106	Thomas Fogdö	1993	Gällivare SK	
107	Marie Lindgren	1994	Umeå-Holmsunds SK	
108	Fredrik Nyberg	1994	Sundsvalls SLK	
109	Ylva Nowén	1995	Östersund-Frösö SLK	
110	Patrik Järbyn	1996	Åre SLK	
111	Bertil Nordqvist	1996	Fältjägarnas IF	
112	Lena Hasselström	1997	OK Renen	
113	Annika Johansson	1997	Umeå-Holmsunds SK	
114	Ann-Charlotte Carlsson	1998	Filipstads SF	
115	Björn Lans	1998	Rehns BK	
116	Bjarne Richardsson	1998	Arboga Alpina	
117	Richard Richardsson	1999	Åre SK	
118	Marja Elfman	1999	Sälens IF	
119	Jörgen Sundqvist	2000	IFK Arvidsjaur	
120	Niklas Henning	2000	Täby SLK	
121	Fredrik Sterner	2000	Leksands SBK	
122	Per Elofsson	2001	IFK Umeå	cross-country skiing
123	Anja Pärson	2001	Tärna IK Fjällvinden	alpine skiing
124	Sara Fischer	2001	Malungs SLK	snowboarding
125	Pontus Ståhlkloo	2001	Gesunda SBK	snowboarding
126	Märta Åberg	2002	Täby SLK	
127	Ulf Mård	2002	Bydalens SBK	
128	Magnus Sterner	2003	Leksands SLK	
129	Daniel Biveson	2003	IFK Lidingö	snowboarding
130	Mathias Fredriksson	2003	Östersunds SK	cross-country skiing
131	Thobias Fredriksson	2004	Östersunds SK	cross-country skiing
132	Stina Grenholm	2004	Vittjärvs IK	ski orienteering
133	Anna Hellman	2004	Malungs SLK	snowboarding
134	Tomas Löfgren	2005	Kvarnsvedens GoIF	ski orienteering
135	Jesper Rönnbäck	2006	Åre SLK	mogul skiing
136	Anna Ottosson	2006	Östersund-Frösö SLK	alpine skiing
137	Fredrik Fortkord	2007	Sollentuna SLK	mogul skiing
138	Mattias Wagenius	2010	Järvsö IF	telemark skiing
139	André Myhrer	2010	Bergsjö Hassela AK	alpine skiing
140	Per Berglund	2010		
141	Maria Pietilä Holmner	2010	Umeå-Holmsunds SK	alpine skiing
142	Magdalena Iljans	2010	Malungs SLK	ski cross
143	Mattias Hargin	2011	Huddinge SK	alpine skiing
144	Markus Larsson	2011	Karlstads SLK	alpine skiing
145	Jens Byggmark	2011	Tärna IK Fjällvinden	alpine skiing
146	Hans Olsson	2011	Mora IK	alpine skiing
147	Linda Baginski	2011	Sollentuna SLK	speed skiing
148	Sebastian Lindblom	2011	Edsåsdalens SLK	speed skiing
149	Sanna Tidstrand	2011	Sälens IF	speed skiing
150	Marcus Hellner	2011	Gellivare Skidallians	cross-country skiing
151	Emil Jönsson	2011	Årsunda IF	cross-country skiing
152	Anders Södergren	2011	Östersunds SK	cross-country skiing
153	Anna Olsson	2011	Åsarna IK	cross-country skiing
154	Charlotte Kalla	2011	IFK Tärendö	cross-country skiing
155	Frida Hansdotter	2012	Norbergs SLK	alpine skiing
156	Therese Borssén	2012	Rättviks SLK	alpine skiing
157	Johan Olsson	2012	Åsarna IK	cross-country skiing
158	Björn Lind	2012	IFK Umeå	cross-country skiing
159	Lina Andersson	2012	Piteå Elit SK	cross-country skiing
160	Ida Ingemarsdotter	2012	Åsarna IK	cross-country skiing
161	Emil Jönsson	2012	IFK Mora	cross-country skiing
162	Anders Svanebo	2012	Stockviks SF	cross-country skiing
163	Marika Sundin	2012	IFK Mora	cross-country skiing
164	Anna Holmlund	2014	Sundsvalls SLK	ski cross
165	Daniel Rickardsson	2014	Hudiksvalls IF	cross-country skiing
166	Teodor Peterson	2014	IFK Umeå	cross-country skiing
167	Maria Magnusson	2015	IK Hakarpspojkarna	roller skiing
168	Jessica Lindell-Vikarby	2015	Huddinge SK	alpine skiing
169	Christian Jansson	2015	Kils SK	speed skiing
170	Victor Öhling Norberg	2015	Funäsdalens SLK	ski cross
171	Lars Lewén	2015	Branäs SC	ski cross
172	Erik Rost	2016	Hudiksvalls IF	ski orienteering
173	Peter Arnesson	2016	Ulricehamns IF	ski orienteering
174	Emma Dahlström	2017	Hovfjället SBC	freestyle skiing
175	Stina Nilsson	2018	IFK Mora	cross-country skiing
176	Matts Olsson	2018	Valfjällets SLK	alpine skiing
177	Sara Hector	2018	Kungsbergets Alpina	alpine skiing
178	Anna Swenn-Larsson	2018	Rättviks SLK	alpine skiing
179	Lisa Hovland	2018	Nolby Alpina	speed skiing
180	Britta Backlund	2018	Rättviks SLK	speed skiing
181	Erik Backlund	2018	Rättviks SLK	speed skiing
182	Linn Sömskar	2018	IFK Umeå	cross-country skiing, roller skiing
183	Robin Norum	2018	IFK Umeå	cross-country skiing, roller skiing
184	Sandra Näslund	2018	Kramfors Alpina	ski cross
185	Walter Wallberg	2019	Åre SLK	mogul skiing
186	Sven Thorgren	2019	Sollentuna SLK	snowboarding
187	Niklas Mattsson	2019	Leksand SFC	snowboarding
188	Ylva Stålnacke	2019	Kiruna BK	alpine skiing
189	Henrik Harlaut	2021	Åre SLK	freestyle skiing
190	Oliwer Magnusson	2021	Åre SLK	freestyle skiing
191	Ludvig Fjällström	2022	Åre SLK	mogul skiing
192	Jonna Sundling	2022	Piteå Elit SK	cross-country skiing
193	Frida Lundblad	2022	Gefle FF	mogul skiing
194	Jesper Tjäder	2022	Östersunds FS	freestyle skiing
195	Alexandra Edebo	2022	IFK Mora	ski cross
196	Lisa Andersson	2022	Gävle Alpina SK	ski cross
197	Rasmus Stegfeldt	2022	Landskrona SC	mogul skiing
198	My Bjerkman	2022	Gefle FF	mogul skiing
199	Moa Gustafson	2023	Värmdö Freestyle MT	mogul skiing
200	Clara Månsson	2023	Landskrona SC	mogul skiing
201	Lars Beskow	2023	Storvreta IK	speed skiing
202	David Mobärg	2024	Edsåsdalens SLK	ski cross

== See also ==
- List of athletes awarded Stora grabbars och tjejers märke
- List of bandy players awarded Stora Grabbars och Tjejers Märke
- List of footballers awarded Stora Grabbars och Tjejers Märke
- List of ice hockey players awarded Stora Grabbars och Tjejers Märke
