= Andorra at the 1980 Winter Olympics =

- IOC code: AND
- NOC: Andorran Olympic Committee
- Website: (in Catalan)

in Lake Placid
- Competitors: 3 (men) in 1 sport
- Medals: Gold 0 Silver 0 Bronze 0 Total 0

Winter Olympics appearances (overview)
- 1976; 1980; 1984; 1988; 1992; 1994; 1998; 2002; 2006; 2010; 2014; 2018; 2022; 2026; 2030

Andorra competed at the 1980 Winter Olympics in Lake Placid, United States.

== Alpine skiing ==
Men

Athlete	Event	Race 1		Race 2		Total	
Athlete	Event	Time	Rank	Time	Rank	Time	Rank
Patrick Toussaint	Downhill					DNF	–
Miguel Font	Downhill					2:02.01	39
Carlos Font	Downhill					1:57.81	35
Patrick Toussaint	Giant Slalom	1:31.23	52	1:33.15	46	3:04.38	45
Miguel Font	Giant Slalom	1:30.93	50	DNF	–	DNF	–
Carlos Font	Giant Slalom	1:29.47	48	1:29.79	40	2:59.26	42
Miguel Font	Slalom	DNF	–	–	–	DNF	–
Patrick Toussaint	Slalom	DNF	–	–	–	DNF	–
Carlos Font	Slalom	1:02.40	32	1:01.30	32	2:03.70	30
