= Bachvarov =

Bachvarov (Bulgarian: Бъчваров; feminine form Bachvarova) is a Bulgarian surname. Notable persons with that name include:

- Iliya Bachvarov (born 1943), Bulgarian hockey player
- Marin Bachvarov (born 1947), Bulgarian hockey player
- Mikhail Bachvarov (1935–2009), Bulgarian sprinter
- Radoslava Bachvarova (born 1987), Bulgarian basketball player
- Rumyana Bachvarova (born 1959), Bulgarian politician
- Todor Bachvarov (born 1932), Bulgarian gymnast
