= Andorra at the 1976 Winter Olympics =

- IOC code: AND
- NOC: Andorran Olympic Committee
- Website: (in Catalan)

in Innsbruck
- Competitors: 5 (men) in 1 sport
- Medals: Gold 0 Silver 0 Bronze 0 Total 0

Winter Olympics appearances (overview)
- 1976; 1980; 1984; 1988; 1992; 1994; 1998; 2002; 2006; 2010; 2014; 2018; 2022; 2026

Andorra competed in the Winter Olympic Games for the first time at the 1976 Winter Olympics in Innsbruck, Austria.

== Alpine skiing ==
Men

Athlete	Event	Race 1		Race 2		Total	
Athlete	Event	Time	Rank	Time	Rank	Time	Rank
Xavier Areny	Downhill					DNF	–
Carlos Font	Downhill					2:01.75	62
Antoine Crespo	Downhill					1:58.72	54
Carlos Font	Giant Slalom	2:11.03	76	2:14.62	48	4:25.65	48
Xavier Areny	Giant Slalom	2:05.86	74	DNF	–	DNF	–
Esteve Tomas	Giant Slalom	2:04.63	72	DNF	–	DNF	–
Antoine Crespo	Giant Slalom	1:59.59	59	DNF	–	DNF	–
Antoni Naudi	Slalom	DNF	–	–	–	DNF	–
Antoine Crespo	Slalom	DNF	–	–	–	DNF	–
Xavier Areny	Slalom	DNF	–	–	–	DNF	–
Carlos Font	Slalom	1:24.98	44	1:31.54	38	2:56.52	38
