= Pellat =

Pellat (or Pelat) may refer to:

== People with the surname ==
- Alexis Pelat (1902-1962), a.k.a. Alexis Pellat, French politician.
- Charles Pellat (1914-1992), French Arabist.
- Patrice Pellat-Finet (born 1952), French alpine skier.

== Locations ==
- Mont Pelat, a mountain in the Alps.
