= Nikolay Mihaylov =

Nikolay Mihaylov, Nikolay Mikhaylov or Nikolai Mikhailov may refer to:

- Nikolai Mikhailov (politician) (1906–1982), Russian Soviet politician, journalist and diplomat
- Nikolay Mikhaylov (conductor) (1932–2006), Soviet military conductor
- Nikolay Mikhaylov (ice hockey) (born 1948), Bulgarian ice hockey player
- Nikolay Mihaylov (cyclist) (born 1988), Bulgarian racing cyclist
- Nikolay Mihaylov (footballer) (born 1988), Bulgarian professional footballer
