= Georgi Iliev =

Georgi Iliev may refer to:

- Georgi Iliev (businessman) (1966–2005), Bulgarian businessman
- Georgi Iliev (footballer, born 1981), Bulgarian footballer
- Georgi Iliev (footballer, born 1956), Bulgarian footballer and manager
- Georgi Iliev (ice hockey) (born 1948), Bulgarian ice hockey player
- Georgi Iliev (gymnast) (born 1996), Bulgarian trampolinist at the 2015 Trampoline World Championships
