= Dikov =

Dikov (Cyrillic: Диков) is a Slavic masculine surname, its feminine counterpart is Dikova. It may refer to

- Paul Dickov (born 1972), Scottish football player
- Sashko Dikov (born 1955), Bulgarian alpine skier
- Svetoslav Dikov (born 1992), Bulgarian football player
- Vitali Dikov (born 1989), Russian football player
