= Walter Dei Vecchi =

Argentine skier (born 1956)

Personal information
- Nationality: Argentine
- Born: 22 March 1956 (age 69)

Sport
- Sport: Alpine skiing

Walter Dei Vecchi (born 22 March 1956) is an Argentine alpine skier. He competed in the men's slalom at the 1976 Winter Olympics.
