= Gérard Bonnevie =

French alpine skier (born 1952)

Gérard Bonnevie (born 20 February 1952 in Val-d'Isère) is a retired French alpine skier who competed in the men's slalom at the 1976 Winter Olympics.
