= Eileen Fuchs =

Scottish skier

Eileen Margaret Fuchs née Knowles
- Born: 30 May 1920
- Died: 11 Jan 2013 (aged 92)
- Known for: promoter of Scottish skiing

Eileen Margaret Fuchs (née Knowles) (30 May 1920 – 11 January 2013) was a skier and promoter of Scottish skiing, and was known as "the Mother of Scottish Skiing".

== Biography ==
From 1938-1942 she studied history at Newnham College. Cambridge, where she was one of a number of women who were not allowed to graduate with a full degree.

An accomplished violinist, in 1953 she went to Vienna, to study the violin. She married Karl Fuchs, an Austrian ski instructor.

With her husband, Karl, in 1954, she bought the Struan Hotel in Carrbridge near Aviemore, and established the Austrian Ski School.

Eileen & Karl had two children, Lisi and Peter, who both skied at national level. Peter Fuchs competed in the 1976 Winter Olympics.

After her husband and son's death, Eileen set up the Karl and Peter Fuchs Memorial Fund to help young Speyside skiers.
