= Spain at the 1976 Winter Olympics =

- IOC code: ESP
- NOC: Spanish Olympic Committee
- Website: www.coe.es (in Spanish)

in Innsbruck
- Competitors: 4 (men) in 1 sport
- Flag bearer: Francisco Fernández Ochoa
- Medals: Gold 0 Silver 0 Bronze 0 Total 0

Winter Olympics appearances (overview)
- 1936; 1948; 1952; 1956; 1960; 1964; 1968; 1972; 1976; 1980; 1984; 1988; 1992; 1994; 1998; 2002; 2006; 2010; 2014; 2018; 2022; 2026

Spain competed at the 1976 Winter Olympics in Innsbruck, Austria.

== Alpine skiing ==
Men

Athlete	Event	Race 1		Race 2		Total	
Athlete	Event	Time	Rank	Time	Rank	Time	Rank
Jorge García	Downhill					1:53.55	42
Jaime Ros	Downhill					1:53.50	41
Juan Manuel Fernández Ochoa	Downhill					1:52.40	36
Francisco Fernández Ochoa	Downhill					1:51.91	35
Jaime Ros	Giant Slalom	1:55.25	48	1:56.54	36	3:51.79	36
Francisco Fernández Ochoa	Giant Slalom	1:48.65	24	1:49.47	27	3:38.12	24
Juan Manuel Fernández Ochoa	Giant Slalom	1:48.06	15	1:46.71	15	3:34.77	16
Jorge García	Slalom	DNF	–	–	–	DNF	–
Juan Manuel Fernández Ochoa	Slalom	DNF	–	–	–	DNF	–
Jaime Ros	Slalom	DNF	–	–	–	DNF	–
Francisco Fernández Ochoa	Slalom	1:02.35	10	1:06.00	10	2:08.35	9
