= Fernando Reutter =

Chilean alpine skier (born 1958)

Personal information
- Nationality: Chilean
- Born: 20 May 1958 (age 66)

Sport
- Sport: Alpine skiing

Fernando Reutter (born 20 May 1958) is a Chilean alpine skier. He competed in the men's downhill at the 1976 Winter Olympics.
