= Ingemar Stenmark =

Swedish alpine skier (born 1956)

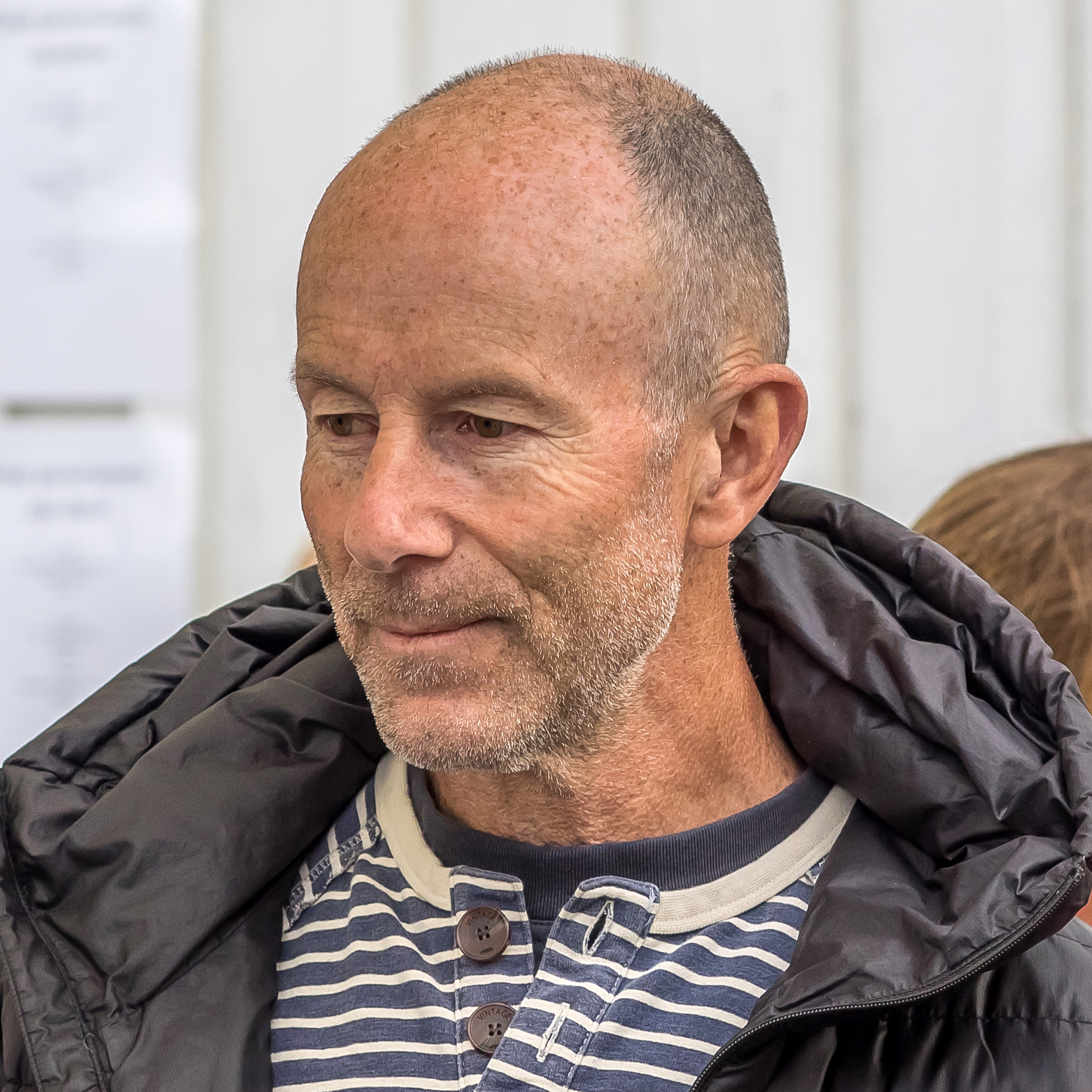
- Stenmark in 2014

Personal information
- Born: 18 March 1956 (age 70) Joesjö, Sweden
- Height: 1.81 m (5 ft 11 in)

Skiing career
- Sport: Alpine skiing
- Club: Tärna IK Fjällvinden

Olympics
- Teams: 3
- Medals: 3 (2 gold)

World Championships
- Medals: 7 (5 gold)

World Cup
- Seasons: 16 (1974–1989)
- Wins: 86 (46 GS, 40 SL)
- Podiums: 155
- Overall titles: 3
- Discipline titles: 16
Medal record
International alpine ski competitions
Event	1st	2nd	3rd
Olympic Games	2	0	1
World Championships	5	1	1
Total	7	1	2
World Cup standings podiums
Event	1st	2nd	3rd
Overall	3	6	0
Slalom	8	4	1
Giant	8	3	0
Total	19	13	1
World Cup race podiums
Event	1st	2nd	3rd
Slalom	40	29	12
Giant	46	13	13
Parallel	0	1	0
Combined	0	0	1
Total	86	43	26
Olympic Games
Gold medal – first place	1980 Lake Placid	Giant slalom
Gold medal – first place	1980 Lake Placid	Slalom
Bronze medal – third place	1976 Innsbruck	Giant slalom
World Championships
Gold medal – first place	1978 Garmisch	Giant slalom
Gold medal – first place	1978 Garmisch	Slalom
Gold medal – first place	1980 Wilmington	Giant slalom
Gold medal – first place	1980 Wilmington	Slalom
Gold medal – first place	1982 Schladming	Slalom
Silver medal – second place	1982 Schladming	Giant slalom
Bronze medal – third place	1976 Innsbruck	Giant slalom

Jan Ingemar Stenmark (Swedish pronunciation: [ˈɪ̌ŋː(ɛ)mar ˈstêːnmark]; born 18 March 1956) is a Swedish former World Cup alpine ski racer. He is regarded as the greatest male skier in technical disciplines and one of the most prominent Swedish athletes ever, having won several Olympic medals and world cups during his career. When he retired in 1989, he held the record for international race wins (86), which was only broken in 2023 by Mikaela Shiffrin and remains unbroken amongst men. He competed for Tärna IK Fjällvinden.

== Early life ==
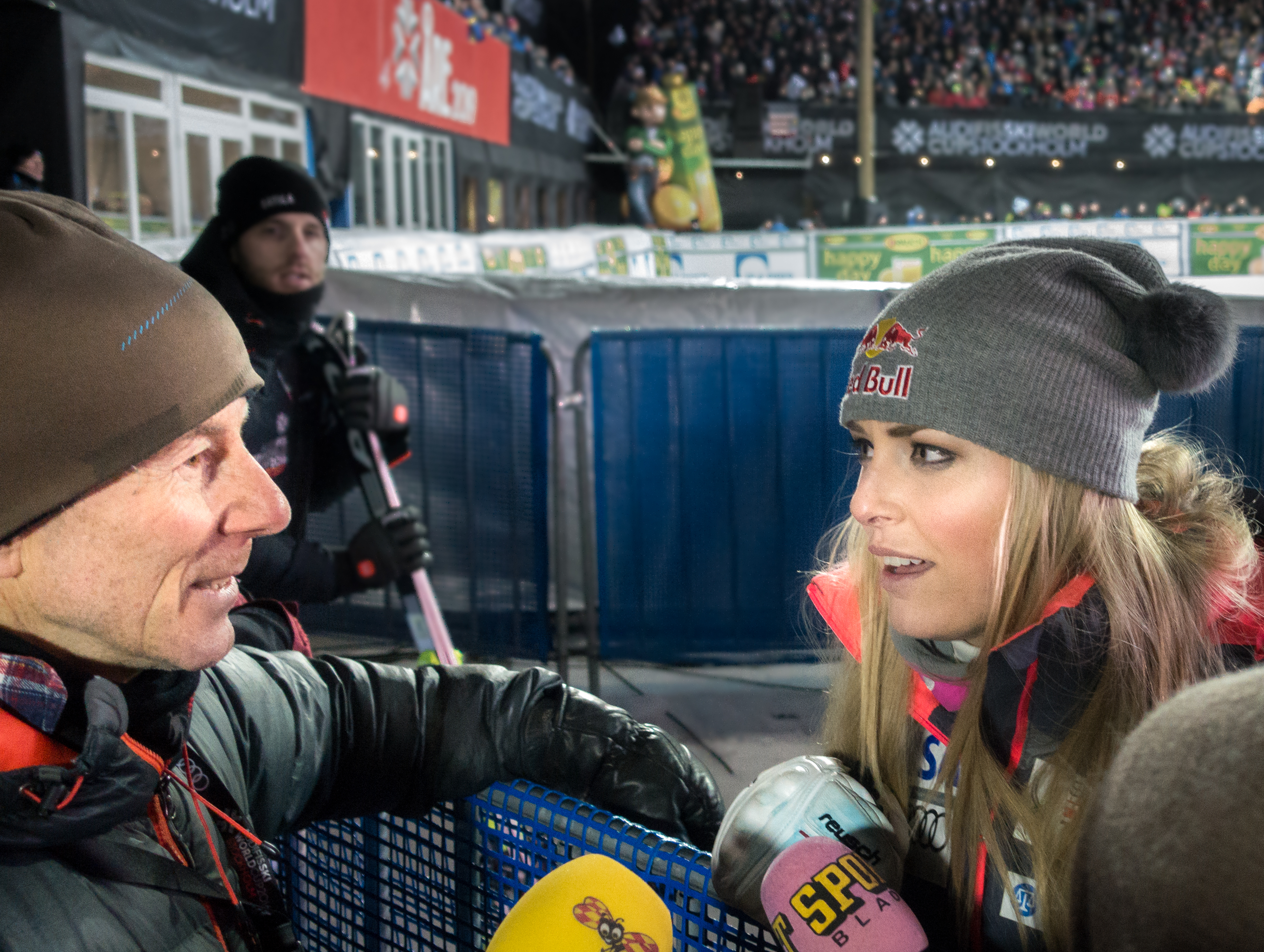
Stenmark and Lindsey Vonn in 2016

Born in Joesjö, Storuman Municipality, Lapland, Stenmark and his family moved to Tärnaby near Norway when he was four years old. He became a childhood neighbour of Stig Strand (also born 1956), who tied Stenmark for the World Cup slalom title in 1983. Stenmark began skiing at the age of five and won his first national competition at age eight.

== Skiing career ==
Stenmark made his World Cup debut in December 1973 at age 17. At the time of his retirement, he had won more international races than any other alpine skier to date: he took 86 World Cup wins (46 giant slaloms and 40 slaloms). He has since been passed by Mikaela Shiffrin. Stenmark won only in the two technical disciplines: slalom and giant slalom (the other events are downhill, super-G, first run in December 1982, and combined). He prioritized these disciplines over the high-speed downhill events, preferring to master the intricacies of skiing technique. His trainer, Hermann Nogler, once observed, "I watched him. He was always trying to find a better way, a smoother way, a faster way through the gates." He rarely competed in the other disciplines, as he was not comfortable with speeds in excess of 120 km/h (75 mph). He won first place overall in the 1976 World Cup, becoming the first Scandinavian to do so, his first of three straight World Cup titles (1976–78). Stenmark still holds the record for the biggest win margin in a World Cup alpine race: 4.06 seconds ahead of 2nd placed Bojan Križaj in Jasna on 4 February 1979. Stenmark was known as a quiet champion, with short, but polite, responses to media questions.

For his three straight World Cup titles (1976–78), Stenmark earned the Holmenkollen medal in 1979 (shared with Erik Håker and Raisa Smetanina). Stenmark also earned the Svenska Dagbladet Gold Medal twice (1975, 1978). His 1978 medal was shared with tennis player Björn Borg, making them the only two men to ever win the honor twice (female alpine skier Anja Pärson received the medal in 2006 and 2007). Additionally, Stenmark stands alone as the only male skier to win eight World Cup titles in a single discipline – both in slalom and giant slalom. After 1978, Stenmark didn't win any more overall World Cup titles (finishing second five times) mainly due to a regulatory change introduced to encourage versatility, and allegedly to contain his excessive power in the technical disciplines.

At the World Championships in 1978 in Garmisch-Partenkirchen West Germany, Stenmark won the slalom by two-thirds of a second and the giant slalom by over two seconds, and successfully defended both world titles at the Winter Olympics in 1980 at Lake Placid, which also were counted as world championships. At the next worlds in 1982 in Austria, he had a sub-standard first run in the giant slalom and was upset by American Steve Mahre and settled for silver. Stenmark rebounded in the slalom and became the first to win the same title in three consecutive world championships. At age 25, it was his final medal in a major competition.

Stenmark's exploits led to him being described as the "slalom king" meaning that when he was not allowed to participate in the 1984 Winter Olympics in Sarajevo by the International Ski Federation (FIS) for accepting promotional payments directly, rather than through the national ski federation, it was a major blow to the Swedish team's medal hopes. Hanni Wenzel of Liechtenstein was also banned; both were double gold medalists in 1980. Marc Girardelli, who was the best slalom racer during the 1983–84 season, was also banned for other reasons. Stenmark returned to Olympic competition in 1988 but was past his prime and did not medal despite achieving the fastest second run of the slalom competition.

He retired from World Cup competition at the end of the 1989 season in March, days before his 33rd birthday. At that time, he held the all-time record for World Cup race wins (86) and race podiums (155), records which stood for over 30 years until both were broken by Mikaela Shiffrin in the 2020s (wins in 2023; podiums in 2025).

== Later life ==
During the years from 1976 to 1978 Stenmark, along with tennis player Björn Borg, became a national icon in Sweden. This was not changed by the fact that he moved to Monaco in 1980 for tax reasons. At age 40, he won the Swedish Superstars championship in 1996. On 26 December 2004, Stenmark survived the Indian Ocean earthquake while on vacation in Thailand. In 2015, he was a celebrity dancer on the Let's Dance 2015, where he teamed up with professional dancer Cecilia Ehrling.

He serves as an ambassador for the Börje Salming ALS Foundation, named after his close friend and Swedish ice hockey player who died of ALS in 2022.

Stenmark switched to the pole vault and competes in masters athletics. He participated in the 2024 World Masters Athletics Championships, where he jumped three meters and placed tenth overall.

== Personal life ==
Stenmark was married to Ann Uvhagen, a Lufthansa airline hostess, 1984–1987. They have a child, born 1984.

== World Cup results ==
=== Season titles ===
- 19 titles – (3 overall, 8 GS, 8 SL)

Overall	Slalom	Giant slalom
1976; 1977; 1978	1975; 1976; 1977; 1978; 1979; 1980; 1981; 1983	1975; 1976; 1977; 1978; 1979; 1980; 1981; 1984
3	8	8

=== Season standings ===
Season	Age	Overall	Slalom	Giant slalom	Super-G	Downhill	Combined
1974	17	12	6	—	not run	—	not awarded
1975	18	2	1	1	not run	—	not awarded
1976	19	1	1	1	not run	—	—
1977	20	1	1	1	not run	—	not awarded
1978	21	1	1	1	not run	—	not awarded
1979	22	5	1	1	not run	—	not awarded
1980	23	2	1	1	not run	—	—
1981	24	2	1	1	not run	—	15
1982	25	2	2	2	not run	—	—
1983	26	2	1	2	not awarded (w/ GS)	—	23
1984	27	2	2	1	not awarded (w/ GS)	—	—
1985	28	6	3	10	not awarded (w/ GS)	—	25
1986	29	5	2	2	—	—	—
1987	30	6	2	7	—	—	—
1988	31	21	16	9	—	—	—
1989	32	17	21	4	—	—	—

=== Race victories ===
86 wins – (46 GS, 40 SL), 155 podiums

Season	Date	Location	Discipline
1975	17 December 1974	Madonna di Campiglio, Italy	Slalom
1975	12 January 1975	Wengen, Switzerland	Slalom
1975	21 February 1975	Naeba, Japan	Giant slalom
1975	2 March 1975	Garibaldi (Whistler), Canada	Giant slalom
1975	13 March 1975	(United States) Sun Valley, USA	Giant slalom
1976	15 December 1975	Sterzing / Vipiteno, Italy	Slalom
1976	11 January 1976	Wengen, Switzerland	Slalom
1976	24 January 1976	Kitzbühel, Austria	Slalom
1976	27 January 1976	Zwiesel, West Germany	Giant slalom
1976	7 March 1976	(United States) Copper Mountain, USA	Slalom
1976	14 March 1976	(United States) Aspen, USA	Slalom
1977	3 January 1977	Laax, Switzerland	Slalom
1977	10 January 1977	(West Germany) Berchtesgaden, W. Germany	Slalom
1977	16 January 1977	Kitzbühel, Austria	Slalom
1977	23 January 1977	Wengen, Switzerland	Slalom
1977	6 February 1977	St. Anton, Austria	Slalom
1977	6 March 1977	(United States) Sun Valley, USA	Giant slalom
1977	18 March 1977	Voss, Norway	Slalom
1977	20 March 1977	Åre, Sweden	Slalom
1977	21 March 1977	Åre, Sweden	Giant slalom
1977	25 March 1977	Sierra Nevada, Spain	Giant slalom
1978	10 December 1977	Val d'Isère, France	Giant slalom
1978	13 December 1977	Madonna di Campiglio, Italy	Slalom
1978	14 December 1977	Madonna di Campiglio, Italy	Giant slalom
1978	5 January 1978	Oberstaufen, West Germany	Slalom
1978	8 January 1978	Zwiesel, West Germany	Giant slalom
1978	9 January 1978	Zwiesel, West Germany	Slalom
1978	18 March 1978	Arosa, Switzerland	Giant slalom
1979	9 December 1978	Schladming, Austria	Giant slalom
1979	21 December 1978	(Socialist Federal Republic of Yugoslavia) Kranjska Gora, Yugoslavia	Slalom
1979	22 December 1978	(Socialist Federal Republic of Yugoslavia) Kranjska Gora, Yugoslavia	Giant slalom
1979	7 January 1979	Courchevel, France	Giant slalom
1979	16 January 1979	Adelboden, Switzerland	Giant slalom
1979	23 January 1979	Steinach, Austria	Giant slalom
1979	4 February 1979	Jasná, Czechoslovakia	Giant slalom
1979	10 February 1979	Åre, Sweden	Giant slalom
1979	11 February 1979	Åre, Sweden	Slalom
1979	4 March 1979	(United States) Lake Placid, USA	Giant slalom
1979	12 March 1979	(United States) Heavenly Valley, USA	Giant slalom
1979	17 March 1979	Furano, Japan	Slalom
1979	19 March 1979	Furano, Japan	Giant slalom
1980	8 December 1979	Val d'Isère, France	Giant slalom
1980	11 December 1979	Madonna di Campiglio, Italy	Slalom
1980	12 December 1979	Madonna di Campiglio, Italy	Giant slalom
1980	21 January 1980	Adelboden, Switzerland	Giant slalom
1980	27 January 1980	Chamonix, France	Slalom
1980	27 February 1980	(United States) Waterville Valley, USA	Slalom
1980	1 March 1980	Mont-Sainte-Anne, Canada	Giant slalom
1980	10 March 1980	Cortina d'Ampezzo, Italy	Slalom
1980	11 March 1980	Cortina d'Ampezzo, Italy	Giant slalom
1980	13 March 1980	Saalbach, Austria	Giant slalom
1980	15 March 1980	Saalbach, Austria	Slalom
1981	9 December 1980	Madonna di Campiglio, Italy	Slalom
1981	10 December 1980	Madonna di Campiglio, Italy	Giant slalom
1981	6 January 1981	Morzine, France	Giant slalom
1981	18 January 1981	Kitzbühel, Austria	Slalom
1981	26 January 1981	Adelboden, Switzerland	Giant slalom
1981	1 February 1981	St. Anton, Austria	Slalom
1981	2 February 1981	Schladming, Austria	Giant slalom
1981	8 February 1981	Oslo, Norway	Slalom
1981	11 February 1981	Voss, Norway	Giant slalom
1981	14 February 1981	Åre, Sweden	Giant slalom
1982	9 January 1982	Morzine, France	Giant slalom
1982	12 January 1982	Bad Wiessee, West Germany	Slalom
1982	17 January 1982	Kitzbühel, Austria	Slalom
1982	19 January 1982	Adelboden, Switzerland	Giant slalom
1982	9 February 1982	Kirchberg, Austria	Giant slalom
1983	14 December 1982	Courmayeur, Italy	Slalom
1983	23 January 1983	Kitzbühel, Austria	Slalom
1983	11 February 1983	Markstein, France	Slalom
1983	13 February 1983	Todtnau, West Germany	Giant slalom
1983	26 February 1983	Gällivare, Sweden	Giant slalom
1984	13 December 1983	Courmayeur, Italy	Slalom
1984	20 December 1983	Madonna di Campiglio, Italy	Slalom
1984	10 January 1984	Adelboden, Switzerland	Giant slalom
1984	17 January 1984	Parpan, Switzerland	Slalom
1984	23 January 1984	Kirchberg, Austria	Giant slalom
1984	4 February 1984	Borovetz, Bulgaria	Giant slalom
1984	7 March 1984	(United States) Vail, USA	Giant slalom
1986	15 December 1985	Alta Badia, Italy	Giant slalom
1986	25 January 1986	St. Anton, Austria	Slalom
1986	27 February 1986	Hemsedal, Norway	Giant slalom
1986	18 March 1986	(United States) Lake Placid, USA	Giant slalom
1987	29 November 1986	Sestriere, Italy	Slalom
1987	14 February 1987	Markstein, France	Slalom
1989	19 February 1989	(United States) Aspen, USA	Giant slalom

=== Podiums ===
Discipline	1st	2nd	3rd	Total
Slalom	40	29	12	81
Giant	46	13	13	72
Parallel	0	1	0	1
Combined	0	0	1	1
	86	43	26	155

== World championship results ==
Year	Age	Slalom	Giant slalom	Super-G	Downhill	Combined
1974	17	DNF	9	not run	—	—
1976	19	DNF2	3	not run	—	—
1978	21	1	1	not run	—	—
1980	23	1	1	not run	—	—
1982	25	1	2	not run	—	—
1985	28	4	DNF	not run	—	—
1987	30	5	10	—	—	—
1989	32	DNF2	6	—	—	—

From 1948 through 1980, the Winter Olympics were also the World Championships for alpine skiing.
At the World Championships from 1954 through 1980, the combined was a "paper race" using the results of the three events (DH, GS, SL).

== Olympic results ==
Year	Age	Slalom	Giant slalom	Super-G	Downhill	Combined
1976	19	DNF2	3	not run	—	not run
1980	23	1	1	not run	—	not run
1984	27	Banned				
1988	31	5	DNF2	—	—	—

- Stenmark and fellow reigning double Olympic champion Hanni Wenzel were banned from the 1984 Olympics for having accepted promotional payments directly, rather than through their national ski federations.

== Other honours ==
- Jerring Award: 1979, 1980
- H. M. The King's Medal: 1978

Preceded by Björn Borg	Svenska Dagbladet Gold Medal; 1975	Succeeded by Anders Gärderud & Bernt Johansson
Preceded by Frank Andersson	Svenska Dagbladet Gold Medal with Björn Borg; 1978	Succeeded by Malmö FF
