= Philippe Barroso =

French alpine skier (born 1955)

Philippe Barroso (born 1 August 1955 in Pau, Pyrénées-Atlantiques) is a retired French alpine skier who competed in the 1976 Winter Olympics, finishing 25th in the giant slalom.
