= Joesjö =

Village in Storuman Municipality, Sweden

Coordinates: 65°43′N 14°40′E

Joesjö (or Jovattnet) is a village in Storuman Municipality in Västerbotten County in Sweden. It lies about 30 kilometres (19 mi) from Tärnaby and Hemavan. To get there from Tärnaby one takes the European route E12 highway (Blue Road) west. After 10 kilometres (6.2 mi) one turns off towards Joesjö and Hattfjelldal (on Krutfjällsvägen, road 1116). From there it is 25 kilometres (16 mi) to Joesjö.

In Joesjö there is, amongst other things, the food store Tärna Vilt AB. Joesjö was previously (up to the 1950s) a centre for trade between people from Midt-Helgeland on the Norwegian border and their neighbouring Swedes. From Joesjö it is barely 20 kilometres (12 mi) to the nearest Norwegian hamlet.

Ingemar Stenmark, an Alpine skier, was born here.

== Climate ==
Climate data for Abelvattnet Aut 1991-2020 (665m)
Month	Jan	Feb	Mar	Apr	May	Jun	Jul	Aug	Sep	Oct	Nov	Dec	Year
Mean daily maximum °C (°F)	−5.8 (21.6)	−6.0 (21.2)	−3.0 (26.6)	1.7 (35.1)	6.8 (44.2)	12.5 (54.5)	15.9 (60.6)	14.2 (57.6)	9.2 (48.6)	2.5 (36.5)	−2.1 (28.2)	−4.5 (23.9)	3.4 (38.1)
Daily mean °C (°F)	−9.8 (14.4)	−10.1 (13.8)	−7.3 (18.9)	−2.7 (27.1)	2.5 (36.5)	7.6 (45.7)	11.2 (52.2)	9.8 (49.6)	5.5 (41.9)	−0.2 (31.6)	−5.2 (22.6)	−8.0 (17.6)	−0.6 (31.0)
Mean daily minimum °C (°F)	−13.9 (7.0)	−14.2 (6.4)	−11.3 (11.7)	−6.2 (20.8)	−0.7 (30.7)	4.1 (39.4)	7.7 (45.9)	6.7 (44.1)	3.1 (37.6)	−2.2 (28.0)	−7.9 (17.8)	−11.5 (11.3)	−3.9 (25.1)
Source: NOAA
