= Esteve Tomas =

Andorran skier (born 1957)

Personal information
- Full name: Esteve Tomas Roca
- Nationality: Andorran
- Born: 25 March 1957 (age 68)

Sport
- Country: Andorra
- Sport: Alpine skiing

Esteve Tomas Roca (Note: In this Catalan name, the first or paternal surname is Tomas and the second or maternal family name is Roca; both are generally joined by the conjunction "i".) (born 25 March 1957) is an Andorran alpine skier. He competed in the men's giant slalom at the 1976 Winter Olympics.
