= Anja Pärson =

Swedish alpine skier

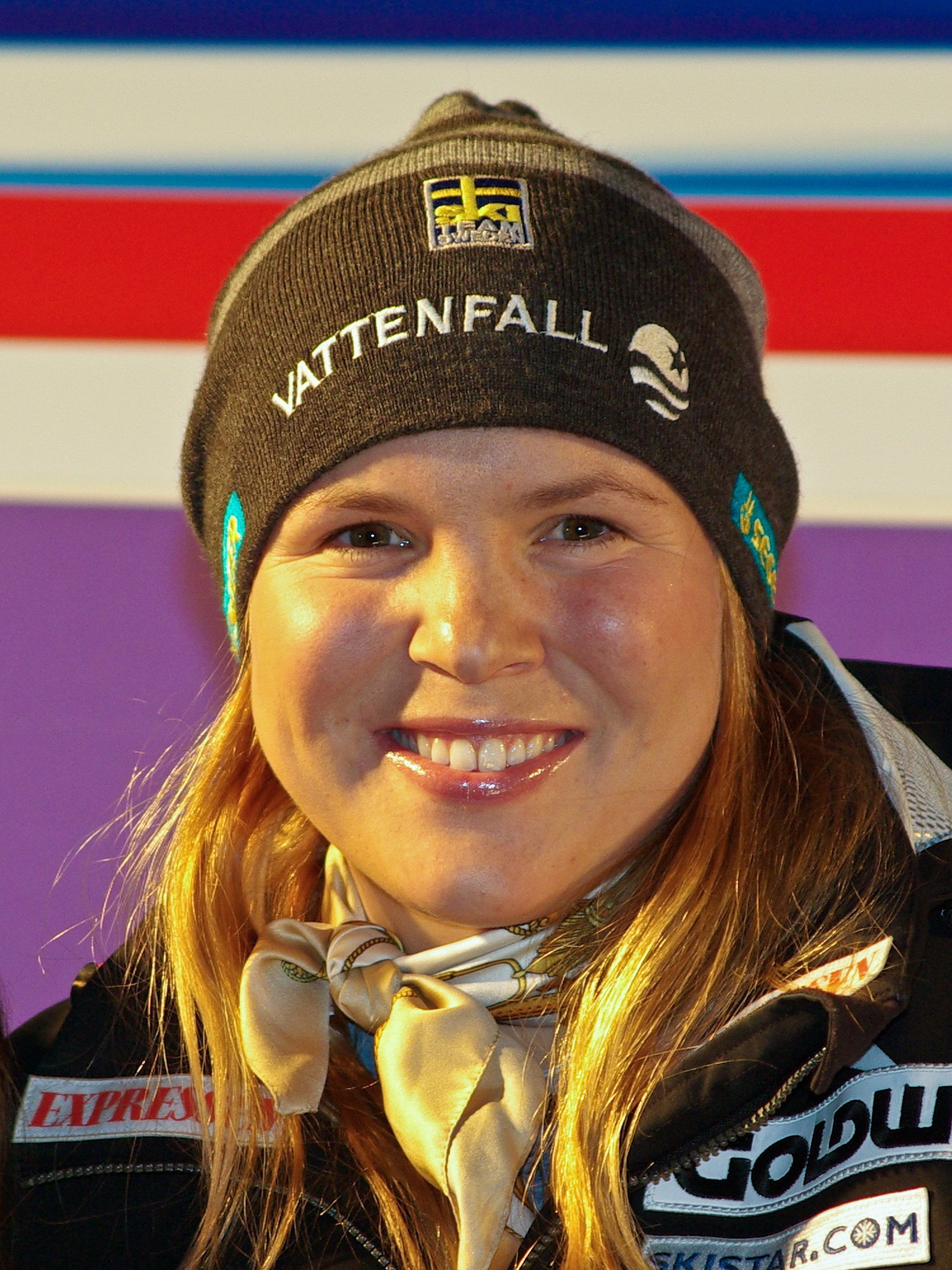
- Pärson in 2008

Personal information
- Born: 25 April 1981 (age 45) Tärnaby, Sweden
- Height: 1.70 m (5 ft 7 in)

Skiing career
- Sport: Alpine skiing
- Club: Tärna IK Fjällvinden
- Retired: 15 March 2012 (age 30)
- Disciplines: Downhill, super-G, slalom, combined, giant slalom
- World Cup debut: 15 March 1998 (age 16)

Olympics
- Teams: 3 – (2002–2010)
- Medals: 6 (1 gold)

World Championships
- Teams: 7 – (1999–2011)
- Medals: 13 (7 gold)

World Cup
- Seasons: 15 – (1998–2012)
- Wins: 42
- Podiums: 95
- Overall titles: 2 – (2004, 2005)
- Discipline titles: 5 – (3 GS, 1 SL, 1 SC)
Medal record
Women's alpine skiing
Representing Sweden
World Cup race podiums
Event	1st	2nd	3rd
Slalom	17	9	7
Giant slalom	11	11	6
Downhill	6	3	6
Super-G	4	4	2
Combined	3	3	2
Parallel	1	0	0
Total	42	30	23
International competitions
Event	1st	2nd	3rd
Olympic Games	1	1	4
World Championships	7	2	4
Junior World Championships	4	0	2
Total	12	3	10
Olympic Games
Gold medal – first place	2006 Turin	Slalom
Silver medal – second place	2002 Salt Lake City	Giant slalom
Bronze medal – third place	2002 Salt Lake City	Slalom
Bronze medal – third place	2006 Turin	Downhill
Bronze medal – third place	2006 Turin	Combined
Bronze medal – third place	2010 Vancouver	Combined
World Championships
Gold medal – first place	2001 St. Anton	Slalom
Gold medal – first place	2003 St. Moritz	Giant slalom
Gold medal – first place	2005 Bormio	Super-G
Gold medal – first place	2005 Bormio	Giant slalom
Gold medal – first place	2007 Åre	Super-G
Gold medal – first place	2007 Åre	Combined
Gold medal – first place	2007 Åre	Downhill
Silver medal – second place	2005 Bormio	Combined
Silver medal – second place	2007 Åre	Team event
Bronze medal – third place	2001 St. Anton	Giant slalom
Bronze medal – third place	2007 Åre	Slalom
Bronze medal – third place	2011 Garmisch-Partenkirchen	Combined
Bronze medal – third place	2011 Garmisch-Partenkirchen	Team event
Junior World Ski Championships
Gold medal – first place	1998 Megève	Giant slalom
Gold medal – first place	1999 Pra Loup	Slalom
Gold medal – first place	2000 Quebec City	Slalom
Gold medal – first place	2000 Quebec City	Giant slalom
Bronze medal – third place	1998 Megève	Slalom
Bronze medal – third place	2000 Quebec City	Super-G

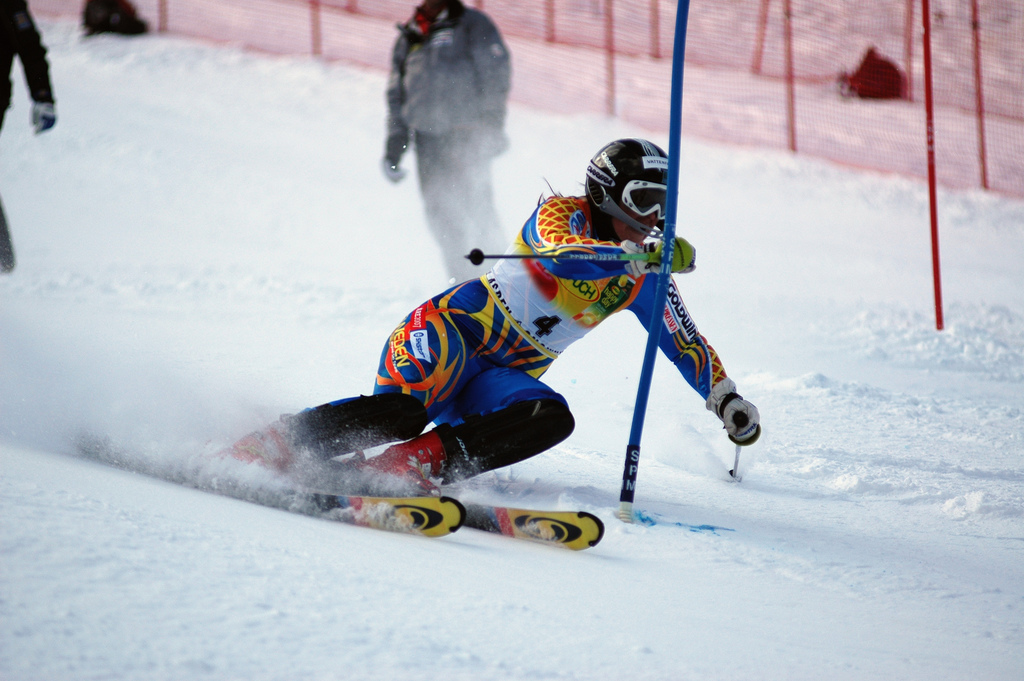
Anja Pärson in Aspen in 2006

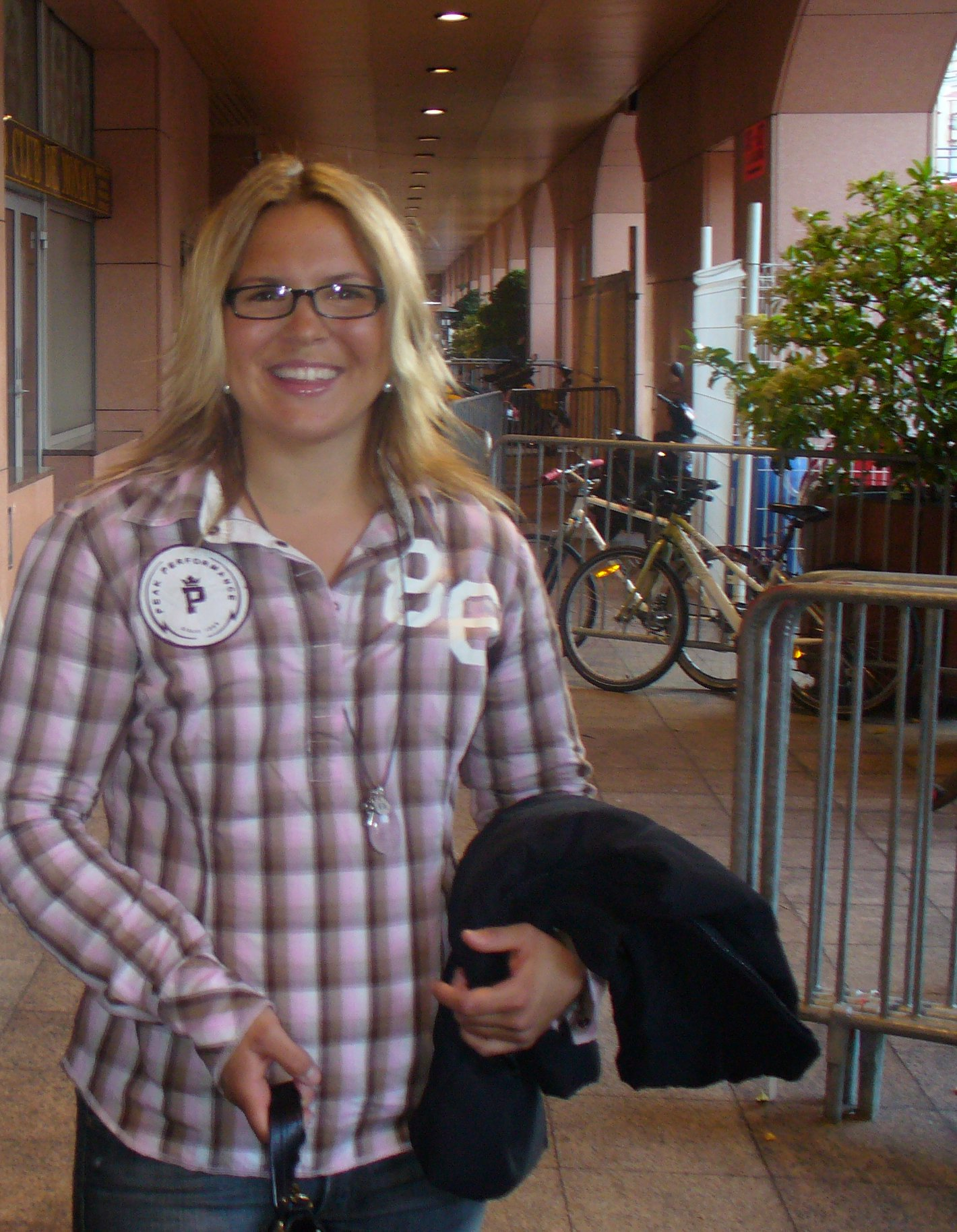
Anja Pärson in Monaco in 2006

Anja Sofia Tess Pärson (Swedish pronunciation: [ˈânːja ˈpæ̌ːʂɔn]; born 25 April 1981) is a Swedish former alpine skier. She is an Olympic gold medalist, seven-time gold medalist at the World Championships, and two-time overall Alpine Skiing World Cup champion. This included winning three gold medals in the 2007 World Championship in her native Sweden. She has won a total of 42 World Cup races.

== Biography ==
Pärson was born in Tärnaby, Sweden, and has Sámi roots. Pärson was introduced to ski racing by her sister, Frida, and is now trained by her father, Anders. Her first World Cup race was a giant slalom at the World Cup Finals at Crans-Montana, Switzerland (on 15 March 1998). She qualified for that race as the new junior World Champion but only finished 25th in last place. She won her first World Cup race, a slalom at Mammoth Mountain, California, in December 1998 at age 17, and her first gold medal at St. Anton, Austria, in 2001. She clinched the silver medal in the giant slalom and the bronze medal in the slalom at the 2002 Winter Olympics, and added the gold in slalom plus two more bronze medals in downhill and combined in 2006 Winter Olympics.

Pärson won the Alpine Skiing World Cup overall title in 2004 and 2005. The latter title was won by the smallest margin ever, only 3 points over her fierce rival, Janica Kostelić. Initially a slalom and giant slalom specialist, she won her first super-G and downhill races in March 2005 at San Sicario, Italy, during the pre-Olympic competitions. In total, she has won 42 World Cup races in all five disciplines.

Pärson has won seven gold medals in the FIS Alpine World Ski Championships, in 2001 (slalom), 2003 (giant slalom), 2005 (giant slalom, super-G) and 2007 (super-G, super combined, downhill). These go along with two silver and three bronze medals in other events in 2001, 2005, 2007 and 2011. With her three gold medals in 2007 at Åre, Sweden, she became the first skier in history to win World Championship golds in all five disciplines.

Pärson has earned a total of 17 individual medals in World Championships and Olympics, exceeding the record by Christl Cranz in women's alpine skiing. In men's alpine skiing this achievement has been beaten only by Kjetil André Aamodt, with 20. After two disappointing seasons (2006/07 and 2007/08 where she finished fifth and sixth in the overall cup), she was back to her best over the 2008/09 season, finishing third in the overall cup.

At the 2010 Winter Olympics, while trying to chase down eventual downhill champion Lindsey Vonn of the United States, Pärson lost her balance on the last jump before the finish, resulting in a 60-metre flight and subsequent fall, without however suffering serious injury. She recovered from the fall and one day later won the bronze medal in the combined event.

With a downhill victory in March 2011, she has won at least one race for ten consecutive World Cup seasons, trailing only Alberto Tomba and Vreni Schneider who won races in eleven consecutive World Cup seasons, and equalling the mark of Renate Götschl, Ingemar Stenmark and Mikaela Shiffrin.

On 12 March 2012, Pärson officially announced her retirement, and that her last competition would be the World Cup final in Schladming the coming weekend.

In 2014, she became an expert commentator for Viasat during the 2014 Winter Olympics in Sochi.

Later, she also worked as a sports expert for the broadcaster Sveriges Television. Currently, she runs a company totegther with her wife.

Pärson competed in the celebrity dance show Let's Dance 2017 broadcast on TV4.

== Personal life ==
Pärson's athletics club is Fjällvinden, Tärnaby, the same to which skiing legend Ingemar Stenmark and Stig Strand belonged.

She was awarded the Svenska Dagbladet Gold Medal in 2006 and in 2007.

After living several years in Monaco during her sports career, she returned to Sweden and has lived in Umeå since 2012.

In June 2012, Pärson announced on the Swedish radio program Sommar that she had been in a relationship with a woman, Filippa Rådin, for the past five years, and that they were expecting a child together. Their son, Elvis, was born on 4 July 2012. On 2 August 2014, Anja Pärson and Filippa married in Umeå, Sweden. Former Swedish Social Democratic Party leader Mona Sahlin officiated at the wedding. In January 2015, the couple announced that Pärson was pregnant with their second child, a boy named Maximilian who was born in May 2015.

== World Cup results ==
=== Season standings ===
Season	Age	Overall	Slalom	Giant slalom	Super-G	Downhill	Combined
1999	17	12	3	12	–	–	–
2000	18	8	3	15	39	–	–
2001	19	11	10	2	–	–	–
2002	20	5	3	3	–	–	–
2003	21	3	2	1	34	–	–
2004	22	1	1	1	15	42	–
2005	23	1	6	2	4	8	2
2006	24	2	3	1	9	7	2
2007	25	5	12	13	6	4	14
2008	26	6	15	15	7	4	3
2009	27	3	10	16	4	7	1
2010	28	3	16	10	7	3	2
2011	29	8	37	25	5	5	6
2012	30	32	–	39	21	28	9

=== Season titles ===
7 titles (2 overall, 3 GS, 1 SL, 1 SC)

Season	Discipline
2003	Giant slalom
2004	Overall
2004	Giant slalom
2004	Slalom
2005	Overall
2006	Giant slalom
2009	Combined

=== Individual races ===
42 wins (6 DH, 4 SG, 11 GS, 18 SL, 3 SC)

Season	Date	Location	Discipline
1999	3 Dec 1998	(United States) Mammoth Mountain, USA	Slalom
2002	9 Dec 2001	Sestriere, Italy	Slalom
2002	29 Dec 2001	Lienz, Austria	Slalom
2002	5 Jan 2002	Maribor, Slovenia	Slalom
2002	6 Jan 2002	Maribor, Slovenia	Slalom
2003	30 Nov 2002	(United States) Aspen, USA	Slalom
2003	15 Dec 2002	Sestriere, Italy	KO-slalom
2003	19 Jan 2003	Cortina d'Ampezzo, Italy	Giant slalom
2003	25 Jan 2003	Maribor, Slovenia	Giant slalom
2003	26 Jan 2003	Maribor, Slovenia	Slalom
2003	6 Mar 2003	Åre, Sweden	Giant slalom
2004	28 Nov 2003	(United States) Park City, USA	Giant slalom
2004	29 Nov 2003	(United States) Park City, USA	Slalom
2004	16 Dec 2003	Madonna di Campiglio, Italy	Slalom
2004	28 Dec 2003	Lienz, Austria	Slalom
2004	5 Jan 2004	Megève, France	Slalom
2004	24 Jan 2004	Maribor, Slovenia	Giant slalom
2004	25 Jan 2004	Maribor, Slovenia	Slalom
2004	7 Feb 2004	Zwiesel, Germany	Giant slalom
2004	8 Feb 2004	Zwiesel, Germany	Slalom
2004	21 Feb 2004	Åre, Sweden	Giant slalom
2004	14 Mar 2004	Sestriere, Italy	Giant slalom
2005	23 Nov 2004	Sölden, Austria	Giant slalom
2005	23 Jan 2005	Maribor, Slovenia	Slalom
2005	25 Feb 2005	San Sicario, Italy	Super-G
2005	26 Feb 2005	San Sicario, Italy	Downhill
2006	11 Dec 2005	(United States) Aspen, USA	Slalom
2006	22 Dec 2005	Špindlerův Mlýn, Czech Republic	Slalom
2006	28 Dec 2005	Lienz, Austria	Giant slalom
2006	13 Jan 2006	Bad Kleinkirchheim, Austria	Downhill
2006	27 Jan 2006	Cortina d'Ampezzo, Italy	Super-G
2006	4 Feb 2006	Ofterschwang, Germany	Giant slalom
2006	11 Mar 2006	Levi, Finland	Slalom
2006	15 Mar 2006	Åre, Sweden	Downhill
2007	15 Mar 2007	Lenzerheide, Switzerland	Super-G
2008	15 Dec 2007	St. Moritz, Switzerland	Downhill
2008	16 Dec 2007	St. Moritz, Switzerland	Super-G
2008	9 Mar 2008	Crans-Montana, Switzerland	Combined
2009	19 Dec 2008	St. Moritz, Switzerland	Combined
2009	18 Jan 2009	Altenmarkt, Austria	Downhill
2010	29 Jan 2010	St. Moritz, Switzerland	Combined
2011	5 Mar 2011	Tarvisio, Italy	Downhill

== World Championship results ==
Year	Age	Slalom	Giant slalom	Super-G	Downhill	Combined
1999	17	DNF1	DNF1	—	—	—
2001	19	1	3	—	—	—
2003	21	4	1	—	—	—
2005	23	DNF2	1	1	7	2
2007	25	3	DNF2	1	1	1
2009	27	9	15	DNF	12	DNF1
2011	29	—	9	10	11	3

== Olympic results ==
Year	Age	Slalom	Giant slalom	Super-G	Downhill	Combined
2002	20	3	2	—	—	—
2006	24	1	6	12	3	3
2010	28	DNF2	22	11	DNF	3

Awards and achievements
Preceded by Kajsa Bergqvist	Svenska Dagbladet Gold Medal; 2006, 2007	Succeeded by Jonas Jacobsson
Olympic Games
Preceded by Magdalena Forsberg	Flagbearer for Sweden; Turin 2006	Succeeded by Peter Forsberg
