= Vladimir Drazhev =

Bulgarian alpine skier (born 1954)

Personal information
- Nationality: Bulgarian
- Born: 22 June 1954 (age 72)

Sport
- Sport: Alpine skiing

Vladimir Drazhev (Bulgarian: Владимир Дражев, born 22 June 1954) is a Bulgarian alpine skier. He competed in the men's giant slalom at the 1976 Winter Olympics.
