= Patrice Pellat-Finet =

French alpine skier (born 1952)

Patrice Pellat-Finet (born 29 August 1952 in Villard-de-Lans) is a French retired alpine skier who competed in the 1976 Winter Olympics, finishing 16th in the men's downhill.
