= Lyubomir Toskov =

Bulgarian cross-country skier (born 1945)

Personal information
- Nationality: Bulgarian
- Born: 17 December 1945 (age 79)

Sport
- Sport: Cross-country skiing

Lyubomir Toskov (Bulgarian: Любомир Тосков; born 17 December 1945) is a Bulgarian cross-country skier. He competed in the men's 15 kilometre event at the 1976 Winter Olympics.
