= Miguel Font =

Andorran alpine skier (born 1963)

Personal information
- Full name: Miguel Font Puig
- Born: 6 August 1963 (age 63) Andorra la Vella, Andorra
- Height: 174 cm (5 ft 9 in)

Sport
- Country: Andorra
- Sport: Alpine skiing

Miguel Font Puig (Note: In this Catalan name, the first or paternal surname is Font and the second or maternal family name is Puig; both are generally joined by the conjunction "i".) (born 6 August 1963) is an Andorran alpine skier. He competed in three events at the 1980 Winter Olympics. He is the brother of alpine skier Carlos Font.
