= Petar Pankov =

Bulgarian cross-country skier (born 1945)

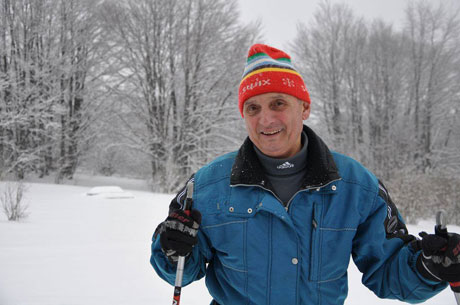

Personal information
- Born: 20 April 1945 (age 79); Sofia, Bulgaria

Sport
- Sport: Cross-country skiing

Petar Pankov (Bulgarian: Петър Панков; born 20 April 1945) is a former Bulgarian cross-country skier. He competed at the 1968 Winter Olympics, the 1972 Winter Olympics and the 1976 Winter Olympics.
