= Alexis Pelat =

French politician

- Born: 31 December 1902; Marseille, France
- Died: 14 January 1962 (aged 59); Marseille, France
- Occupation: Politician
- Spouse: Louise-Marie Delvat
- Children: 2

Alexis Pelat (1902-1962) was a French politician. He served as a member of the National Assembly from 1956 to 1958, representing Bouches-du-Rhône.

== Early life ==
Alexis Pelat was born on 31 December 1902 in Marseille, France. His father was a pastry chef. He did his military service in Saarbrücken and served in the French Army during World War II.

== Career ==
Pelat worked as a pastry chef in Marseille.

Pelat joined the Union for the Defense of Tradesmen and Artisans. He served as a member of the National Assembly from 1956 to 1958, representing Bouches-du-Rhône. He was a proponent of French Algeria.

== Personal life and death ==
Pelat married Louise-Marie Delvat, and they had two children. He died on 14 January 1962 in Marseille, France.
