= Rob McIntyre =

Australian alpine skier (born 1956)

Personal information
- Nationality: Australian
- Born: 10 March 1956 (age 70)

Sport
- Sport: Alpine skiing

Rob McIntyre (born 10 March 1956) is an Australian alpine skier. He competed at the 1976 Winter Olympics and the 1980 Winter Olympics.
