= Ernst Good =

Swiss alpine skier (born 1950)

Personal information
- Born: 14 January 1950 (age 76)
Medal record
Men's alpine skiing
Representing Switzerland
Olympic Games
Silver medal – second place	1976 Innsbruck	Giant slalom

Ernst Good (born 14 January 1950) is a former Swiss alpine skier. At the 1976 Winter Olympics, Good won the silver medal in giant slalom. He is the brother of Olympian Rita Good.
