= Jens Byggmark =

Swedish alpine skier (born 1985)

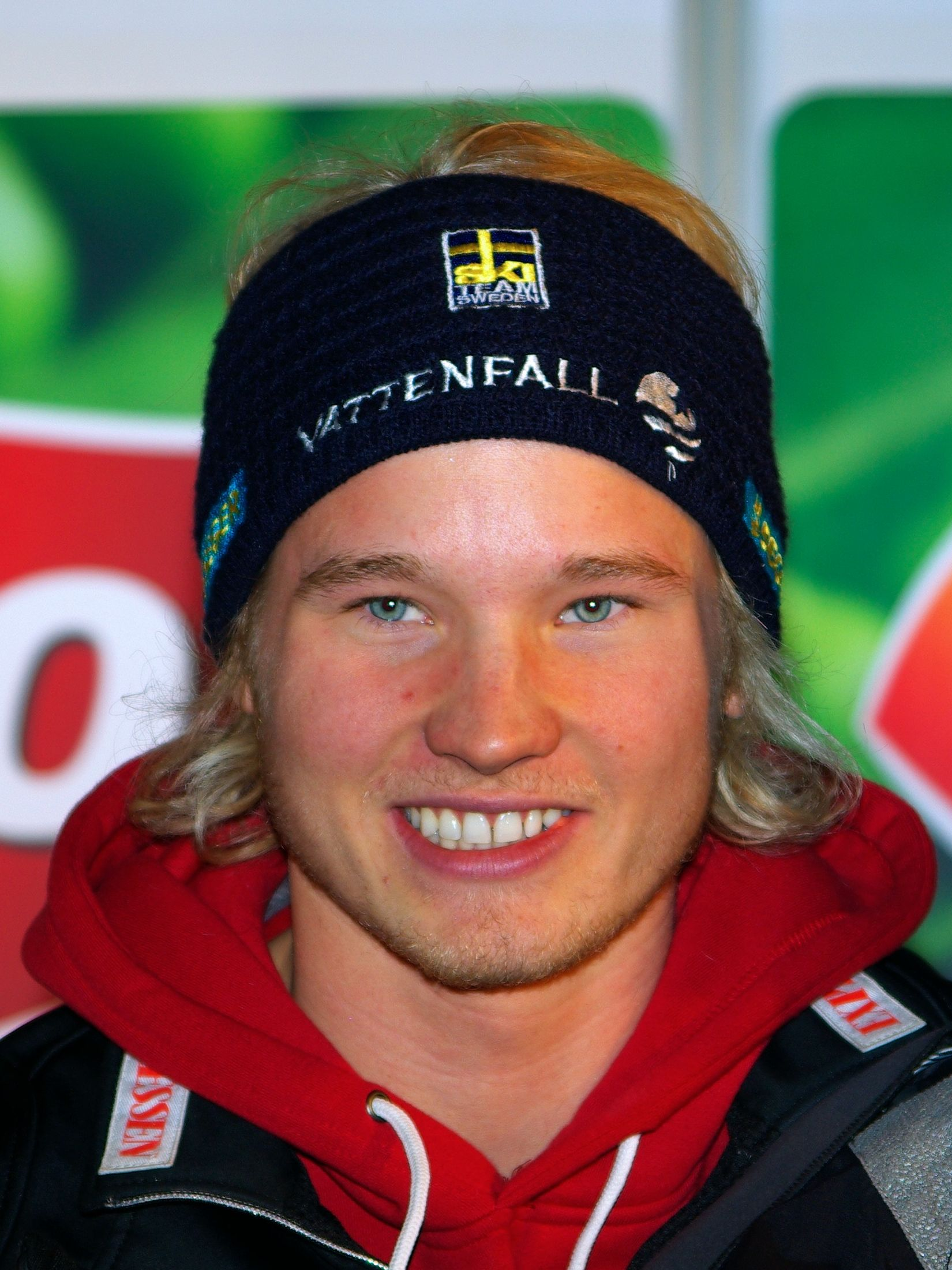
- Byggmark in 2008

Personal information
- Born: 22 August 1985 (age 40) Örebro, Sweden
- Website: www.jensbyggmark.se

Skiing career
- Sport: Alpine skiing
- Club: Tärna IK Fjällvinden
- Disciplines: Slalom
- World Cup debut: 23 January 2005 (age 19)

Olympics
- Teams: 1 – (2010)
- Medals: 0

World Championships
- Teams: 5 – (2007–15)
- Medals: 1 (0 gold)

World Cup
- Seasons: 9 – (2007–2013, 2015–2016)
- Wins: 2 – (2 SL)
- Podiums: 8 – (8 SL)
- Overall titles: 0 – (15th in 2007)
- Discipline titles: 0 – (3rd in SL: 2007)
Medal record
Men's alpine skiing
Representing Sweden
World Championships
Silver medal – second place	2007 Åre	Team event
Silver medal – second place	2011 Garmisch-Partenkirchen	Slalom
Silver medal – second place	2013 Schladming	Team event

Jens Byggmark (born 22 August 1985) is a Swedish former World Cup alpine ski racer who specialised in the technical events of slalom and giant slalom.

Byggmark was born in Örebro but was raised in Tärnaby. He raced for Tärna IK Fjällvinden, the world's most successful ski club. He made his debut in the European Cup in 2005.

Byggmark has Sámi roots on his mother's side. He has two children, a daughter and a son, together with his wife, Michaela Delér.

== World Cup ==
Byggmark made his World Cup debut in 2005, and has won two slalom events, both during the 2007 season, on successive days at Kitzbühel, Austria. Two days later, he placed second in the slalom at Schladming, Austria.

After having struggled for some years with poor results and bad starting positions, Byggmark made a strong comeback during the 2011 season and for two seasons he had a place in the first start group. In September 2013, he suffered a knee injury and missed the 2014 season, including the Olympic Games.

== World Cup results ==
=== Season standings ===
Season	Age	Overall	Slalom	Giant slalom	Super-G	Downhill	Combined
2007	21	15	3	49	—	—	33
2008	22	30	10	45	—	—	28
2009	23	94	35	—	—	—	41
2010	24	102	36	—	—	—	—
2011	25	46	16	—	—	—	—
2012	26	36	9	—	—	—	—
2013	27	25	8	—	—	—	—
2014	28	—	—	—	—	—	—
2015	29	59	19	—	—	—	—
2016	30	73	25	—	—	—	—
2017	31	126	46	—	—	—	—

=== Race podiums ===
- 2 wins – (2 SL)
- 8 podiums – (8 SL)

Season	Date	Location	Discipline	Place
2007	27 Jan 2007	Kitzbühel, Austria	Slalom	1st
2007	28 Jan 2007	Kitzbühel, Austria	Slalom	1st
2007	30 Jan 2007	Schladming, Austria	Slalom	2nd
2008	9 Dec 2007	Bad Kleinkirchheim, Austria	Slalom	2nd
2008	12 Jan 2008	Wengen, Switzerland	Slalom	2nd
2008	20 Jan 2008	Kitzbühel, Austria	Slalom	2nd
2013	11 Nov 2012	Levi, Finland	Slalom	3rd
2015	22 Dec 2014	Madonna di Campiglio, Italy	Slalom	3rd

== World Championship results ==
Year	Age	Slalom	Giant slalom	Super-G	Downhill	Combined
2007	21	DNF1	DNF1	—	—	DNF2
2009	23	DSQ2	DNF1	—	—	—
2011	25	2	—	—	—	—
2013	27	8	—	—	—	—
2015	29	DNF2	—	—	—	—

== Olympic results ==
Year	Age	Slalom	Giant slalom	Super-G	Downhill	Combined
2010	24	22	—	—	—	—
2014	28	—	—	—	—	—
