= Patrick Toussaint =

Andorran alpine skier (born 1959)

Personal information
- Full name: Patrick Toussaint Mas
- Nationality: Andorran
- Born: 10 April 1959 (age 67)

Sport
- Country: Andorra
- Sport: Alpine skiing

Patrick Toussaint Mas (born 10 April 1959) is an Andorran alpine skier. He competed in three events at the 1980 Winter Olympics.
