= Tärna IK Fjällvinden =

Sports club in Tärnaby, Sweden

- Full name: Tärna idrottsklubb Fjällvinden
- Sport: alpine skiing, cross-country skiing, gymnastics
- Founded: 1928
- Based in: Tärnaby, Sweden

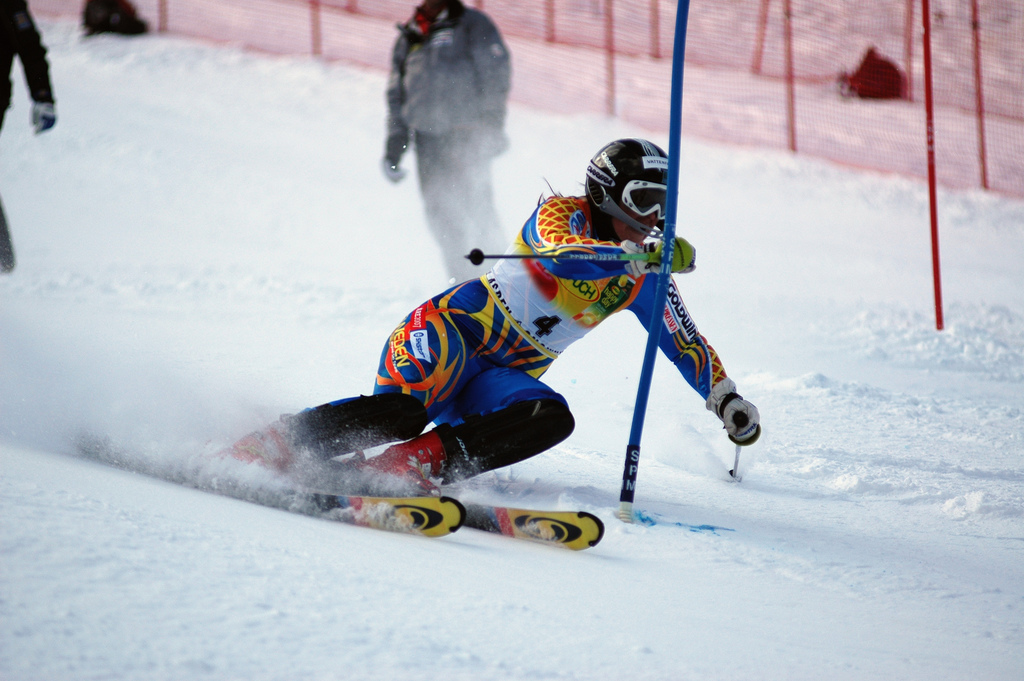
Anja Pärson

Tärna IK Fjällvinden is an alpine skiing club in Tärnaby, Sweden. Although Tärnaby has a population of a mere 500, Fjällvinden was the landmark for many professional alpine skiers, such as Ingemar Stenmark, Anja Pärson, Stig Strand, Jens Byggmark, and Bengt Fjällberg.

== History ==
IK Fjällvinden was founded in Umfors, while Tärna IK was founded in Tärnaby. The two clubs merged in 1928, adopting cross-country skiing. Alpine skiing was adopted in 1937.

== Notable winnings ==
- Three Olympic gold medals
- One Olympic silver medal
- Five Olympic bronze medals
- Ten World Championship gold medals
- Six World Championship silver medals
- Six World Championship bronze medals
- 129 Alpine Skiing World Cup victories
- More than 100 Swedish National Championship gold medals.
- 5 overall World Cup victories
- 22 World Cup discipline victories

== FIS Alpine World Ski Championships ==
- Anja Pärson: 7 gold, 2 silver, 4 bronze
- Ingemar Stenmark: 3 gold, 1 silver, 1 bronze
- Jens Byggmark: 3 silver
- Bengt Fjällberg: 1 bronze

== Winter Olympics ==
- Ingemar Stenmark: 2 gold, 1 bronze
- Anja Pärson: 1 gold, 1 silver, 4 bronze

== FIS World Cup discipline champions ==
- Ingemar Stenmark: 3 overall, 8 slalom, 8 giant slalom
- Anja Pärson: 2 overall, 3 giant slalom, 1 slalom, 1 combined
- Stig Strand: 1 slalom

== Etymology ==
The name "Fjällvinden" fittingly translates to "The wind on the mountains".
