= Antoni Naudi =

Andorran alpine skier (born 1951)

Personal information
- Full name: Antoni Naudi Casal
- Nationality: Andorran
- Born: 5 September 1951 (age 73)

Sport
- Sport: Alpine skiing

Antoni Naudi Casal (Note: In this Catalan name, the first or paternal surname is Naudi and the second or maternal family name is Casal; both are generally joined by the conjunction "i".) (born 5 September 1951) is an Andorran alpine skier. He competed in the men's slalom at the 1976 Winter Olympics.
