= Rehns BK =

Sports club in Bollnäs, Sweden

Rehns BK is a Swedish sports club in Bollnäs, which practices orienteering, cross-country skiing and athletics (mainly running). It started with bandy in 1933, but that sport was dropped in 1946. The name refers the eastern district of Bollnäs, Ren/Rehn.

== Orienteering ==
The club started with orienteering in 1936. It was one of the arranging clubs of O-ringen in 1981, 2006 and 2011.

Its team won the Swedish championships in relay in 1973 with Folke Lysell, Karl-Erik Jonsson, Kaj Hoof, Stefan Persson. Kaj Hoof, substituting the injured Lars-Ivar Svensson started the third leg in the 19th position and sent Stefan Persson out as the third. Stefan Persson has won three times the Swedish Championships in night orienteering.

In 1975 Rehns BK arranged a competition for the 30 best orienteers in the world with Persson as the course designer. It was the first orienteering competition sent on television.

Jerker Lysell, world champion in 2016, represents the club. Marit Wiksell won the World Championships in precision orienteering in Portugal in 2019.
