= Geoff Bruce =

American alpine skier (born 1953)

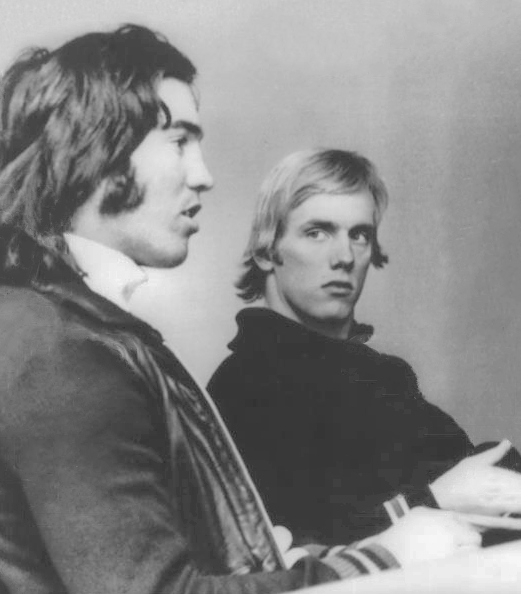
- Bruce (right) in 1976

Personal information
- Full name: Geoffrey Seabury Bruce
- Born: January 26, 1953 (age 73) Corning, New York, U.S.
- Education: Holderness
- Occupation: Co-Founder of Hotronic
- Spouse: Kathleen O'Malley

Sport
- Country: USA
- Sport: Alpine skiing
- Event: Slalom
- Club: US Ski Team
- Retired: 1985

Achievements and titles
- Olympic finals: Innsbruck 1976
- Highest world ranking: 7

Geoffrey Seabury "Geoff" Bruce (born January 26, 1953) is a former World Cup alpine ski racer. He competed in the slalom at the 1976 Winter Olympics, but failed to finish. He had many notable accomplishments in his racing career, including a 4th in the World Cup slalom at Madonna di Campiglio in 1974 and a 5th in the World Cup slalom at Kitzbuehel in 1975. Geoff skied for the Holderness School and was a member of the national team from 1974–78. In 1974–75, he placed 28th overall in the FIS Alpine Ski World Cup.
