= Atanas Iliev (ice hockey) =

Bulgarian ice hockey player

- Born: November 12, 1944 (age 80)
- Position: Goaltender
- Caught: Left
- National team: Bulgaria
- NHL draft: Undrafted
- Playing career: ?–?

Atanas Iliev (Bulgarian: Атанас Илиев; born November 12, 1944) is a former Bulgarian ice hockey goaltender. He played for the Bulgaria men's national ice hockey team at the 1976 Winter Olympics in Innsbruck.
