= Sashko Dikov =

Bulgarian alpine skier (born 1952)

Personal information
- Nationality: Bulgarian
- Born: 25 July 1952 (age 72)

Sport
- Sport: Alpine skiing

Sashko Dikov (Bulgarian: Сашко Диков, born 25 July 1952) is a Bulgarian alpine skier. He competed in the men's slalom at the 1976 Winter Olympics.
