= Dimo Krastinov =

Bulgarian ice hockey player

- Born: January 20, 1946 (age 79)
- Position: Defence
- Shot: Left
- National team: Bulgaria
- NHL draft: Undrafted
- Playing career: 1975–1976

Dimo Krastinov (Bulgarian: Димо Кръстинов; born January 20, 1946) is a former Bulgarian ice hockey player. He played for the Bulgaria men's national ice hockey team at the 1976 Winter Olympics in Innsbruck.
