= Ivan Markovski =

Bulgarian ice hockey player

- Born: August 18, 1955 (age 69)
- Position: Defence
- Shot: Left
- National team: Bulgaria
- NHL draft: Undrafted
- Playing career: 1968–1984

Ivan Markovski (Bulgarian: Иван Марковски; born August 18, 1955) is a former Bulgarian ice hockey player. He played for the Bulgaria men's national ice hockey team at the 1976 Winter Olympics in Innsbruck.
