= Ivan Atanasov (ice hockey) =

Bulgarian ice hockey player

- Born: April 30, 1956 (age 70)
- Position: Forward
- Shot: Left
- National team: Bulgaria
- NHL draft: Undrafted
- Playing career: ?–?

Ivan Atanasov (Bulgarian: Иван Атанасов; born April 30, 1956) is a former Bulgarian ice hockey player. He played for the Bulgaria men's national ice hockey team at the 1976 Winter Olympics in Innsbruck.

His older brother, Malin Atanasov, also played for the Bulgarian national ice hockey team at the 1976 Winter Olympics.
