= Nikolay Petrov (ice hockey) =

Bulgarian ice hockey player

- Born: September 1, 1956 (age 68)
- Position: Defence
- Shot: Left
- National team: Bulgaria
- NHL draft: Undrafted
- Playing career: 1975–1979

Nikolay Petrov (Bulgarian: Николай Петров; born September 1, 1956) is a former Bulgarian ice hockey player. He played for the Bulgaria men's national ice hockey team at the 1976 Winter Olympics in Innsbruck.
