= Adrián Roncallo =

Argentine alpine skier (born 1958)

Personal information
- Nationality: Argentine
- Born: 24 August 1958 (age 68)

Sport
- Sport: Alpine skiing

Adrián Roncallo (born 24 August 1958) is an Argentine alpine skier. He competed in two events at the 1976 Winter Olympics.
