= Malin Atanasov =

Bulgarian ice hockey player

- Born: 14 June 1946 (age 80) Plovdiv, Bulgaria
- Position: Forward
- Shot: Left
- National team: Bulgaria
- NHL draft: Undrafted
- Playing career: 1969–1983

Malin Atanasov (Bulgarian: Малин Атанасов; born 14 June 1946) is a former Bulgarian ice hockey player. He played for the Bulgaria men's national ice hockey team at the 1976 Winter Olympics in Innsbruck.

His younger brother, Ivan Atanasov, also played for the Bulgarian national ice hockey team at the 1976 Winter Olympics.
