= Dimitri Lazarov =

Bulgarian ice hockey player

- Born: 18 June 1946 (age 79)
- National team: Bulgaria
- NHL draft: Undrafted
- Playing career: ?–?

Dimitri Lazarov (Bulgarian: Димитри Лазаров; born 18 June 1946) is a former Bulgarian ice hockey player. He played for the Bulgaria men's national ice hockey team at the 1976 Winter Olympics in Innsbruck.
