= Kiril Gerasimov =

Bulgarian ice hockey player

- Born: February 3, 1946 (age 79)
- Position: Forward
- National team: Bulgaria
- NHL draft: Undrafted
- Playing career: 1975–1977

Kiril Gerasimov (Bulgarian: Кирил Герасимов; born January 3, 1946) is a former Bulgarian ice hockey player. He played for the Bulgaria men's national ice hockey team at the 1976 Winter Olympics in Innsbruck.
