= Ivan Penelov =

Bulgarian ice hockey player

- Born: May 18, 1948 (age 76)
- Position: Defence
- Shot: Left
- National team: Bulgaria
- NHL draft: Undrafted
- Playing career: ?–?

Ivan Penelov (Bulgarian: Иван Пенелов; born May 18, 1948) is a former Bulgarian ice hockey player. He played for the Bulgaria men's national ice hockey team at the 1976 Winter Olympics in Innsbruck.
