= Milcho Nenov =

Bulgarian ice hockey player

- Born: December 19, 1957 (age 67)
- National team: Bulgaria
- NHL draft: Undrafted
- Playing career: ?–?

Milcho Nenov (Bulgarian: Милчо Ненов; born December 19, 1957) is a former Bulgarian ice hockey player. He played for the Bulgaria men's national ice hockey team at the 1976 Winter Olympics in Innsbruck.
