= Lyubomir Lyubomirov =

Bulgarian ice hockey player

- Born: February 12, 1953
- Died: October 9, 2020 (aged 67)
- Position: Forward
- Shot: Left
- National team: Bulgaria
- NHL draft: Undrafted
- Playing career: ?–?

Lyubomir Lyubomirov (Bulgarian: Любомир Любомиров; February 12, 1953 – October 9, 2020) was a Bulgarian ice hockey player. He played for the Bulgaria men's national ice hockey team at the 1976 Winter Olympics in Innsbruck.
