= Petar Radev =

Bulgarian ice hockey player

- Born: July 6, 1948 (age 76)
- Position: Goaltender
- Caught: Left
- National team: Bulgaria
- NHL draft: Undrafted
- Playing career: ?–?

Petar Radev (Bulgarian: Петър Радев; born July 6, 1948) is a former Bulgarian ice hockey goaltender. He played for the Bulgaria men's national ice hockey team at the 1976 Winter Olympics in Innsbruck.
