= Mohammad Kalhor =

Iranian alpine skier (born 1956)

Personal information
- Nationality: Iranian
- Born: 1956 (age 69–70)

Sport
- Sport: Alpine skiing

Mohammad Kalhor (born 1956) is an Iranian alpine skier. He competed in three events at the 1976 Winter Olympics.
