= Akbar Kalili =

Iranian alpine skier (1956–2018)

Personal information
- Nationality: Iranian
- Born: 1956
- Died: 28 February 2018 (aged 61–62)

Sport
- Sport: Alpine skiing

Akbar Kalili (Persian: اکبر کلیلی, 1956 – 28 February 2018) was an Iranian alpine skier. He competed in three events at the 1976 Winter Olympics.
