= Luis Rosenkjer =

Argentine alpine skier (born 1955)

Personal information
- Born: 7 August 1955 (age 69); San Carlos de Bariloche, Argentina

Sport
- Sport: Alpine skiing

Luis Rosenkjer (born 7 August 1955) is an Argentine alpine skier. He competed in three events at the 1976 Winter Olympics.
