= Juan Angel Olivieri =

Argentine alpine skier (born 1957)

Personal information
- Born: 28 June 1957 (age 67); San Carlos de Bariloche, Argentina

Sport
- Sport: Alpine skiing

Juan Angel Olivieri (born 28 June 1957) is an Argentine alpine skier. He competed in three events at the 1976 Winter Olympics.
