= Iliya Bachvarov =

Bulgarian ice hockey player

- Born: October 10, 1943 (age 83) Sofia, Kingdom of Bulgaria
- team: HC CSKA Sofia
- National team: Bulgaria
- NHL draft: Undrafted
- Playing career: 1962–1976

Iliya Bachvarov (Bulgarian: Илия Бъчваров; born October 10, 1943) is a former Bulgarian ice hockey player. He played for the Bulgaria men's national ice hockey team at the 1976 Winter Olympics in Innsbruck.

His younger brother, Marin Bachvarov, also played for the Bulgarian national ice hockey team at the 1976 Winter Olympics.
