= Peter Fuchs (skier) =

British alpine skier (1955–1980)

Personal information
- Full name: Karl Peter Maurice Fuchs
- Nationality: British
- Born: 28 October 1955; Purley, London, England
- Died: 22 September 1980 (aged 24); Carrbridge, Scotland

Sport
- Sport: Alpine skiing

Karl Peter Maurice Fuchs (28 October 1955 – 22 September 1980) was a British alpine skier. He competed in three events at the 1976 Winter Olympics. He was killed in a car accident in Carrbridge, Scotland.

Fuchs' mother was Eileen Fuchs née Knowles.
