= Nikolay Mikhaylov (ice hockey) =

Bulgarian ice hockey player

- Born: February 19, 1948 (age 77)
- National team: Bulgaria
- NHL draft: Undrafted
- Playing career: ?–?

Nikolay Mikhaylov (Bulgarian: Николай Михайлов; born February 19, 1948) is a former Bulgarian ice hockey player. He played for the Bulgaria men's national ice hockey team at the 1976 Winter Olympics in Innsbruck.
