= Marin Bachvarov =

Bulgarian ice hockey player

- Born: June 30, 1947 (age 79) Sofia, People's Republic of Bulgaria
- Height: 5 ft 9 in (175 cm)
- Weight: 165 lb (75 kg; 11 st 11 lb)
- team: HC Levski Sofia; HC CSKA Sofia
- National team: Bulgaria
- NHL draft: Undrafted
- Playing career: 1969–1982

Marin Bachvarov (Bulgarian: Марин Бъчваров; born June 30, 1947) is a former Bulgarian ice hockey player. He played for the Bulgaria men's national ice hockey team at the 1976 Winter Olympics in Innsbruck.

His older brother, Iliya Bachvarov, also played for the Bulgarian national ice hockey team at the 1976 Winter Olympics.
