= Carlos Alberto Martínez =

Argentine alpine skier (born 1957)

Personal information
- Born: 23 April 1957 (age 69) San Carlos de Bariloche, Argentina

Sport
- Sport: Alpine skiing

Carlos Alberto Martínez (born 23 April 1957) is an Argentine alpine skier. He competed in three events at the 1976 Winter Olympics.
