= Mohammad Hadj Kia Shemshaki =

Iranian alpine skier (born 1955)

Personal information
- Nationality: Iranian
- Born: 1955 (age 69–70); Tehran, Iran

Sport
- Sport: Alpine skiing

Mohammad Hadj Kia Shemshaki (Persian: محمدهادی کیاشمشکی, born 1955) is an Iranian alpine skier. He competed in three events at the 1976 Winter Olympics.
