= Jorge García (alpine skier) =

Spanish alpine skier (born 1956)

Jorge García (born 2 May 1956) is a Spanish former alpine skier who competed in the 1976 Winter Olympics and in the 1980 Winter Olympics.
