= Georgi Iliev (ice hockey) =

Bulgarian ice hockey player

- Born: January 18, 1948 (age 77)
- Position: Defence
- National team: Bulgaria
- NHL draft: Undrafted
- Playing career: 1966–1982

Georgi Iliev (Bulgarian: Георги Илиев; born January 18, 1948) is a former Bulgarian ice hockey player. He played for the Bulgaria men's national ice hockey team at the 1976 Winter Olympics in Innsbruck.
