= Kim Clifford (alpine skier) =

Australian alpine skier (born 1956)

Personal information
- Nationality: Australian
- Born: 16 October 1956 (age 70) Thredbo, New South Wales, Australia

Sport
- Sport: Alpine skiing

Kim Clifford (born 16 October 1956) is an Australian alpine skier. He competed in two events at the 1976 Winter Olympics.
