= Xavier Areny =

Andorran alpine skier (born 1957)

Personal information
- Nationality: Andorran
- Born: 8 May 1957 (age 69)

Sport
- Sport: Alpine skiing

Xavier Areny Fite (born 8 May 1957) is an Andorran alpine skier. He competed in three events at the 1976 Winter Olympics.
