= Jaime Ros =

Spanish alpine skier (born 1952)

Jaime Ros (born 5 November 1952) is a Spanish former alpine skier who competed in the 1976 Winter Olympics.
