= Georgi Kochov =

Bulgarian alpine skier (born 1955)

Personal information
- Nationality: Bulgarian
- Born: 10 November 1955 (age 69)

Sport
- Sport: Alpine skiing

Georgi Kochov (Bulgarian: Георги Кочов, born 10 November 1955) is a Bulgarian alpine skier. He competed in three events at the 1976 Winter Olympics.
