= Antoine Crespo =

Andorran alpine skier (born 1955)

Personal information
- Full name: Antoine Crespo Travesset
- Nationality: Andorran
- Born: 15 November 1955 (age 71)

Sport
- Country: Andorra
- Sport: Alpine skiing

Antoine Crespo Travesset (Note: In this Catalan name, the first or paternal surname is Crespo and the second or maternal family name is Travesset; both are generally joined by the conjunction "i".) (born 15 November 1955) is an Andorran alpine skier. He competed in three events at the 1976 Winter Olympics.
