= Juan Manuel Fernández Ochoa =

Spanish alpine skier (born 1951)

Juan Manuel Fernández Ochoa (born 24 June 1951) is a Spanish former alpine skier who competed in the 1976 Winter Olympics.
