= Carlos Font =

Andorran alpine skier (born 1960)

Personal information
- Full name: Carlos Font Puig
- Nationality: Andorran
- Born: 27 January 1960 (age 66)

Sport
- Country: Andorra
- Sport: Alpine skiing

Carlos Font Puig (Note: In this Catalan name, the first or paternal surname is Font and the second or maternal family name is Puig; both are generally joined by the conjunction "i".) (born 27 January 1960) is an Andorran alpine skier. He competed at the 1976 Winter Olympics and the 1980 Winter Olympics. He is the brother of alpine skier Miguel Font.
