= List of flag bearers for Iceland at the Olympics =

Iceland at the Olympics
- IOC code: ISL
- NOC: National Olympic and Sports Association of Iceland
- Website: www.olympic.is (in Icelandic)
- Medals: Gold 0 Silver 2 Bronze 2 Total 4

Summer appearances
- 1908; 1912; 1920–1932; 1936; 1948; 1952; 1956; 1960; 1964; 1968; 1972; 1976; 1980; 1984; 1988; 1992; 1996; 2000; 2004; 2008; 2012; 2016; 2020; 2024

Winter appearances
- 1948; 1952; 1956; 1960; 1964; 1968; 1972; 1976; 1980; 1984; 1988; 1992; 1994; 1998; 2002; 2006; 2010; 2014; 2018; 2022; 2026

This is a list of flag bearers who have represented Iceland at the Olympics. Flag bearers carry the national flag of their country at the opening ceremony of the Olympic Games.

#	Event year	Season	Flag bearer	Sport
1	1936	Summer	Kristján Vattnes	Athletics
2	1948	Winter	Hermann Stefánsson	Coach
3	1948	Summer	Finnbjörn Þorvaldsson	Athletics
4	1952	Winter	Gisli B. Kristjánsson	Team leader
5	1952	Summer	Friðrik Guðmundsson	Athletics
6	1956	Winter	Valdimar Örnólfsson	Alpine skiing (did not compete)
7	1956	Summer	Vilhjálmur Einarsson	Athletics
8	1960	Winter	Kristinn Benediktsson	Alpine skiing
9	1960	Summer	Pétur Rögnvaldsson	Athletics
10	1964	Winter	Valdimar Örnólfsson	Official
11	1964	Summer	Valbjörn Þorláksson	Athletics
12	1968	Winter	Kristinn Benediktsson	Alpine skiing
13	1968	Summer	Guðmundur Hermannsson	Athletics
14	1972	Summer	Geir Hallsteinsson	Handball
15	1976	Winter	Árni Óðinsson	Alpine skiing
16	1976	Summer	Óskar Jakobsson	Athletics
17	1980	Winter	Haukur Sigurðsson	Cross-country skiing
18	1980	Summer	Birgir Borgþórsson	Weightlifting
19	1984	Winter	Nanna Leifsdóttir	Alpine skiing
20	1984	Summer	Einar Vilhjálmsson	Athletics
21	1988	Winter	Einar Ólafsson	Cross-country skiing
22	1988	Summer	Bjarni Friðriksson	Judo
23	1992	Winter	Ásta Halldórsdóttir	Alpine skiing
24	1992	Summer	Bjarni Friðriksson	Judo
25	1994	Winter	Ásta Halldórsdóttir	Alpine skiing
26	1996	Summer	Jón Arnar Magnússon	Athletics
27	1998	Winter	Theódóra Mathiesen	Alpine skiing
28	2000	Summer	Guðrún Arnardóttir	Athletics
29	2002	Winter	Dagný Linda Kristjánsdóttir	Alpine skiing
30	2004	Summer	Guðmundur Hrafnkelsson	Handball
31	2006	Winter	Dagný Linda Kristjánsdóttir	Alpine skiing
32	2008	Summer	Örn Arnarson	Swimming
33	2010	Winter	Björgvin Björgvinsson	Alpine skiing
34	2012	Summer	Ásdís Hjálmsdóttir	Athletics
35	2014	Winter	Sævar Birgisson	Cross-country skiing
36	2016	Summer	Þormóður Árni Jónsson	Judo
37	2018	Winter	Freydís Halla Einarsdóttir	Alpine skiing
38	2020	Summer	Snæfríður Jórunnardóttir	Swimming
38	2020	Summer	Anton McKee	Swimming
39	2022	Winter	Kristrún Guðnadóttir	Cross-country skiing
39	2022	Winter	Sturla Snær Snorrason	Alpine skiing
40	2024	Summer	Edda Hannesdóttir	Swimming
40	2024	Summer	Hákon Þór Svavarsson	Shooting

== See also ==
- Iceland at the Olympics
