= Iceland at the 1952 Winter Olympics =

- IOC code: ISL
- NOC: Olympic Committee of Iceland

in Oslo
- Competitors: 11 (men) in 3 sports
- Flag bearer: Gisli B. Kristjánsson
- Medals: Gold 0 Silver 0 Bronze 0 Total 0

Winter Olympics appearances (overview)
- 1948; 1952; 1956; 1960; 1964; 1968; 1972; 1976; 1980; 1984; 1988; 1992; 1994; 1998; 2002; 2006; 2010; 2014; 2018; 2022; 2026

Iceland competed at the 1952 Winter Olympics in Oslo, Norway.

== Alpine skiing ==
Men

Athlete	Event	Race 1		Race 2		Total	
Athlete	Event	Time	Rank	Time	Rank	Time	Rank
Jón Karl Sigurðsson	Downhill					3:10.1	54
Ásgeir Eyjólfsson	Downhill					3:08.3	52
Stefán Kristjánsson	Downhill					3:06.1	50
Haukur Sigurðsson	Downhill					3:06.0	49
Stefán Kristjánsson	Giant Slalom					3:12.5	68
Ásgeir Eyjólfsson	Giant Slalom					3:06.4	63
Jón Karl Sigurðsson	Giant Slalom					3:01.5	57
Haukur Sigurðsson	Giant Slalom					2:57.0	51
Haukur Sigurðsson	Slalom	DNF	–	did not advance			
Stefán Kristjánsson	Slalom	1:10.2	46	did not advance			
Jón Karl Sigurðsson	Slalom	1:09.3	40	did not advance			
Ásgeir Eyjólfsson	Slalom	1:06.4	30 Q	1:09.7	27	2:16.1	27

== Cross-country skiing ==
Men

Event	Athlete	Race	
Event	Athlete	Time	Rank
18 km	Oddur Pétursson	1'13:35	55
18 km	Jón Kristjánsson	1'12:05	45
18 km	Ebeneser Þórarinsson	1'11:10	40
18 km	Gunnar Pétursson	1'10:30	32
50 km	Matthías Kristjánsson	4'48:47	33
50 km	Jón Kristjánsson	4'41:32	30
50 km	Ivar Stefánsson	4'39:50	29

Men's 4 × 10 km relay

Athletes	Race	
Athletes	Time	Rank
Gunnar Pétursson; Ebeneser Þórarinsson; Jón Kristjánsson; Ívar Stefánsson	2'40:09	11

== Ski jumping ==
Athlete	Event	Jump 1			Jump 2			Total	
Athlete	Event	Distance	Points	Rank	Distance	Points	Rank	Points	Rank
Ari Guðmundsson	Normal hill	60.0	89.0	38	59.0	94.0	27	183.0	35

== Sources ==
- Petersen, Rolf, ed. (1952). The Official Report of the Organising Committee of the VIth Winter Olympic Games 1952 at Oslo (PDF). Oslo. Archived from the original (PDF) on 2007-09-30.
- Olympic Winter Games 1952, full results by sports-reference.com
