= Iceland at the 1976 Winter Olympics =

- IOC code: ISL
- NOC: Olympic Committee of Iceland

in Innsbruck
- Competitors: 8 (6 men, 2 women) in 2 sports
- Flag bearer: Árni Óðinsson
- Medals: Gold 0 Silver 0 Bronze 0 Total 0

Winter Olympics appearances (overview)
- 1948; 1952; 1956; 1960; 1964; 1968; 1972; 1976; 1980; 1984; 1988; 1992; 1994; 1998; 2002; 2006; 2010; 2014; 2018; 2022; 2026

Iceland competed at the 1976 Winter Olympics in Innsbruck, Austria.

== Alpine skiing ==
Men

Athlete	Event	Race 1		Race 2		Total	
Athlete	Event	Time	Rank	Time	Rank	Time	Rank
Árni Óðinsson	Giant Slalom	2:05.28	73	DNF	–	DNF	–
Tómas Leifsson	Giant Slalom	2:01.83	67	2:03.54	46	4:05.37	46
Haukur Jóhannsson	Giant Slalom	2:01.76	64	DNF	–	DNF	–
Sigurður Jónsson	Giant Slalom	1:58.46	57	1:57.76	37	3:56.22	39
Tómas Leifsson	Slalom	DNF	–	–	–	DNF	–
Haukur Jóhannsson	Slalom	1:10.89	40	1:13.16	31	2:24.05	32
Sigurður Jónsson	Slalom	1:07.28	32	1:10.06	23	2:17.34	24

Women

Athlete	Event	Race 1		Race 2		Total	
Athlete	Event	Time	Rank	Time	Rank	Time	Rank
Steinunn Sæmundsdóttir	Giant Slalom					1:41.07	36
Jórunn Viggósdóttir	Giant Slalom					1:40.81	35
Jórunn Viggósdóttir	Slalom	DNF	–	–	–	DNF	–
Steinunn Sæmundsdóttir	Slalom	53.55	24	51.17	16	1:44.72	16

== Cross-country skiing ==
Men

Event	Athlete	Race	
Event	Athlete	Time	Rank
15 km	Trausti Sveinsson	52:50.29	69
15 km	Halldór Matthíasson	48:42.22	47
30 km	Halldór Matthíasson	1'50:02.09	64
30 km	Trausti Sveinsson	1'47:48.45	63
50 km	Halldór Matthíasson	3'02:51.17	42

== Sources ==
- Official Olympic Reports
- Olympic Winter Games 1976, full results by sports-reference.com
