= Iceland at the Olympics =

- IOC code: ISL
- NOC: National Olympic and Sports Association of Iceland
- Website: www.isi.is (in Icelandic)
- Medals Ranked 123rd: Gold 0 Silver 2 Bronze 2 Total 4

Summer appearances
- 1908; 1912; 1920–1932; 1936; 1948; 1952; 1956; 1960; 1964; 1968; 1972; 1976; 1980; 1984; 1988; 1992; 1996; 2000; 2004; 2008; 2012; 2016; 2020; 2024; 2028

Winter appearances
- 1948; 1952; 1956; 1960; 1964; 1968; 1972; 1976; 1980; 1984; 1988; 1992; 1994; 1998; 2002; 2006; 2010; 2014; 2018; 2022; 2026

Athletes from Iceland first participated at the Olympic Games in 1908.

The National Olympic Committee was created in 1921 and recognized by the International Olympic Committee in 1935. After 1936, Iceland has sent athletes to compete in every Summer Olympic Games since. Iceland has also participated in all but one edition of the Winter Olympic Games since 1948, missing only the 1972 Winter Games.

Icelandic athletes have won a total of four medals, two in athletics, one in judo and one in handball.

== Medal tables ==
=== Medals by Games ===
| Games | Athletes | Gold | Silver | Bronze | Total | Rank |
| 1908 London | 1 | 0 | 0 | 0 | 0 | – |
| 1912 Stockholm | 2 | 0 | 0 | 0 | 0 | – |
| 1920–1932 | did not participate | | | | | |
| 1936 Berlin | 12 | 0 | 0 | 0 | 0 | – |
| 1948 London | 20 | 0 | 0 | 0 | 0 | – |
| 1952 Helsinki | 9 | 0 | 0 | 0 | 0 | – |
| 1956 Melbourne | 2 | 0 | 1 | 0 | 1 | 31 |
| 1960 Rome | 9 | 0 | 0 | 0 | 0 | – |
| 1964 Tokyo | 4 | 0 | 0 | 0 | 0 | – |
| 1968 Mexico City | 7 | 0 | 0 | 0 | 0 | – |
| 1972 Munich | 25 | 0 | 0 | 0 | 0 | – |
| 1976 Montreal | 13 | 0 | 0 | 0 | 0 | – |
| 1980 Moscow | 9 | 0 | 0 | 0 | 0 | – |
| 1984 Los Angeles | 32 | 0 | 0 | 1 | 1 | 43 |
| 1988 Seoul | 32 | 0 | 0 | 0 | 0 | – |
| 1992 Barcelona | 27 | 0 | 0 | 0 | 0 | – |
| 1996 Atlanta | 9 | 0 | 0 | 0 | 0 | – |
| 2000 Sydney | 18 | 0 | 0 | 1 | 1 | 71 |
| 2004 Athens | 26 | 0 | 0 | 0 | 0 | – |
| 2008 Beijing | 29 | 0 | 1 | 0 | 1 | 70 |
| 2012 London | 28 | 0 | 0 | 0 | 0 | – |
| 2016 Rio de Janeiro | 8 | 0 | 0 | 0 | 0 | – |
| 2020 Tokyo | 4 | 0 | 0 | 0 | 0 | – |
| 2024 Paris | 5 | 0 | 0 | 0 | 0 | – |
| 2028 Los Angeles | future event | | | | | |
| 2032 Brisbane | future event | | | | | |
| Total | | 0 | 2 | 2 | 4 | 123 |

=== Medals by Winter Games ===
| Games | Athletes | Gold | Silver | Bronze | Total | Rank |
| 1948 St. Moritz | 4 | 0 | 0 | 0 | 0 | – |
| 1952 Oslo | 11 | 0 | 0 | 0 | 0 | – |
| 1956 Cortina d'Ampezzo | 7 | 0 | 0 | 0 | 0 | – |
| 1960 Squaw Valley | 4 | 0 | 0 | 0 | 0 | – |
| 1964 Innsbruck | 5 | 0 | 0 | 0 | 0 | – |
| 1968 Grenoble | 4 | 0 | 0 | 0 | 0 | – |
| 1972 Sapporo | did not participate | | | | | |
| 1976 Innsbruck | 8 | 0 | 0 | 0 | 0 | – |
| 1980 Lake Placid | 6 | 0 | 0 | 0 | 0 | – |
| 1984 Sarajevo | 5 | 0 | 0 | 0 | 0 | – |
| 1988 Calgary | 3 | 0 | 0 | 0 | 0 | – |
| 1992 Albertville | 5 | 0 | 0 | 0 | 0 | – |
| 1994 Lillehammer | 5 | 0 | 0 | 0 | 0 | – |
| 1998 Nagano | 7 | 0 | 0 | 0 | 0 | – |
| 2002 Salt Lake City | 6 | 0 | 0 | 0 | 0 | – |
| 2006 Turin | 5 | 0 | 0 | 0 | 0 | – |
| 2010 Vancouver | 4 | 0 | 0 | 0 | 0 | – |
| 2014 Sochi | 5 | 0 | 0 | 0 | 0 | – |
| 2018 Pyeongchang | 5 | 0 | 0 | 0 | 0 | – |
| 2022 Beijing | 5 | 0 | 0 | 0 | 0 | – |
| 2026 Milano Cortina | 5 | 0 | 0 | 0 | 0 | – |
| 2030 French Alps | future event | | | | | |
| 2034 Utah | future event | | | | | |
| Total | | 0 | 0 | 0 | 0 | – |

=== Medals by summer sport ===
| Sport | Gold | Silver | Bronze | Total |
|---|---|---|---|---|
| Athletics | 0 | 1 | 1 | 2 |
| Handball | 0 | 1 | 0 | 1 |
| Judo | 0 | 0 | 1 | 1 |
| Totals (3 entries) | 0 | 2 | 2 | 4 |

== List of medalists ==
| Medal | Name | Games | Sport | Event |
|---|---|---|---|---|
| Silver | Vilhjálmur Einarsson | 1956 Melbourne | Athletics | Men's triple jump |
| Bronze | Bjarni Friðriksson | 1984 Los Angeles | Judo | Men's 95 kg |
| Bronze | Vala Flosadóttir | 2000 Sydney | Athletics | Women's pole vault |
| Silver | National team: Sturla Ásgeirsson, Arnór Atlason, Logi Eldon Geirsson, Snorri Steinn Guðjónsson, Hreiðar Guðmundsson, Róbert Gunnarsson, Björgvin Páll Gustavsson, Ásgeir Örn Hallgrímsson, Ingimundur Ingimundarson, Sverre Andreas Jakobsson, Alexander Petersson, Guðjón Valur Sigurðsson, Sigfús Sigurðsson, Ólafur Stefánsson | 2008 Beijing | Handball | Men's competition |

== Summary by Summer sport ==
Iceland first participated in the Summer Olympic games in 1908 and 1912. After that they returned in 1936 and have participated in every Summer Olympic Games since then.

They have won a total of four medals; 2 silver and 2 bronze. Vilhjálmur Einarsson won silver in men's triple jump in 1956, Bjarni Friðriksson won bronze in men's 95 kg Judo in 1984, Vala Flosadóttir won bronze in women's pole vault in 2000 and the Iceland men's national handball team won silver in men's handball competition in 2008.

=== Aquatics ===
For the swimming discipline, follow these links: Swimming and Water polo.

Iceland has yet to participate in Artistic swimming and Diving.

=== Athletics ===
Athletics has been included in the Summer Olympic programme since the inaugural 1896 Games. Iceland first participated in the sport 1912. They returned to the sport in 1936 and have participated in it every Summer Olympic Games since then.

They have won two medals in the sport. Vilhjálmur Einarsson won silver i men's triple jump in 1956 and Vala Flosadóttir won bronze in women's pole vault in 2000.

| Games | Athletes | Events | Gold | Silver | Bronze | Total | Ranking |
|---|---|---|---|---|---|---|---|
| 1912 Stockholm | 1 | 1/30 | 0 | 0 | 0 | 0 | |
| 1936 Berlin | 4 | 5/29 | 0 | 0 | 0 | 0 | |
| 1948 London | 12 | 12/33 | 0 | 0 | 0 | 0 | |
| 1952 Helsinki | 9 | 11/33 | 0 | 0 | 0 | 0 | |
| 1956 Melbourne | 2 | 2/33 | 0 | 1 | 0 | 1 | =14 |
| 1960 Rome | 7 | 9/34 | 0 | 0 | 0 | 0 | |
| 1964 Tokyo | 2 | 2/36 | 0 | 0 | 0 | 0 | |
| 1968 Mexico City | 3 | 3/36 | 0 | 0 | 0 | 0 | |
| 1972 Munich | 4 | 5/38 | 0 | 0 | 0 | 0 | |
| 1976 Montreal | 7 | 10/37 | 0 | 0 | 0 | 0 | |
| 1980 Moscow | 4 | 6/38 | 0 | 0 | 0 | 0 | |
| 1984 Los Angeles | 7 | 6/41 | 0 | 0 | 0 | 0 | |
| 1988 Seoul | 7 | 5/42 | 0 | 0 | 0 | 0 | |
| 1992 Barcelona | 4 | 3/43 | 0 | 0 | 0 | 0 | |
| 1996 Atlanta | 3 | 3/44 | 0 | 0 | 0 | 0 | |
| 2000 Sydney | 6 | 5/46 | 0 | 0 | 1 | 1 | =40 |
| 2004 Athens | 2 | 2/46 | 0 | 0 | 0 | 0 | |
| 2008 Beijing | 3 | 3/47 | 0 | 0 | 0 | 0 | |
| 2012 London | 3 | 3/47 | 0 | 0 | 0 | 0 | |
| 2016 Rio de Janeiro | 3 | 3/47 | 0 | 0 | 0 | 0 | |
| 2020 Tokyo | 1 | 1/48 | 0 | 0 | 0 | 0 | |
| Total | | | 0 | 1 | 1 | 2 | =83 |

=== Badminton ===
Badminton has been included in the Olympic programme since 1992. Iceland has participated in the sport four times.

The best placements were 17th, which Iceland has accomplished three times. First by Árni Þór Hallgrímson alone in men's singles and together with Broddi Kristjánsson in men's doubles in 1992 and finally by Ragna Ingólfsdóttir in women's singles in 2012.

| Games | Players | Events | Gold | Silver | Bronze | Total | Ranking |
|---|---|---|---|---|---|---|---|
| 1992 Barcelona | 3 | 3/4 | 0 | 0 | 0 | 0 | |
| 1996 Atlanta | 1 | 1/5 | 0 | 0 | 0 | 0 | |
| 2008 Beijing | 1 | 1/5 | 0 | 0 | 0 | 0 | |
| 2012 London | 1 | 1/5 | 0 | 0 | 0 | 0 | |
| Total | | | 0 | 0 | 0 | 0 | – |

=== Gymnastics ===
Iceland has yet to participate in the disciplines Rhythmic gymnastics and Trampoline.

==== Artistic gymnastics ====
Artistic gymnastics has been included in the Summer Olympic programme since the inaugural 1896 Games. Iceland has participated four times, first in 1996.

Their best placement is 7th by Rúnar Alexandersson in men's pommel horse in 2004.

The highest placed in a women's event was 40th by Irina Sazonova in women's artistic individual all-around in 2016.

| Games | Gymnasts | Events | Gold | Silver | Bronze | Total | Ranking |
|---|---|---|---|---|---|---|---|
| 1996 Atlanta | 1 | 7/14 | 0 | 0 | 0 | 0 | |
| 2000 Sydney | 1 | 7/14 | 0 | 0 | 0 | 0 | |
| 2004 Athens | 1 | 7/14 | 0 | 0 | 0 | 0 | |
| 2016 Rio de Janeiro | 1 | 4/14 | 0 | 0 | 0 | 0 | |
| Total | | | 0 | 0 | 0 | 0 | – |

=== Handball ===
Handball was included in the Olympic programme in 1936. It returned in 1972 and has remained in the Olympic programme ever since. Iceland first participated in 1972 and has participated in the sport many times since then.

Iceland men's national handball team managed to win silver in the men's tournament in 2008.

| Games | Handballers | Events | Gold | Silver | Bronze | Total | Ranking |
|---|---|---|---|---|---|---|---|
| 1972 Munich | 15 | 1/1 | 0 | 0 | 0 | 0 | |
| 1984 Los Angeles | 15 | 1/2 | 0 | 0 | 0 | 0 | |
| 1988 Seoul | 15 | 1/2 | 0 | 0 | 0 | 0 | |
| 1992 Barcelona | 14 | 1/2 | 0 | 0 | 0 | 0 | |
| 2004 Athens | 15 | 1/2 | 0 | 0 | 0 | 0 | |
| 2008 Beijing | 14 | 1/2 | 0 | 1 | 0 | 1 | =3 |
| 2012 London | 14 | 1/2 | 0 | 0 | 0 | 0 | |
| Total | | | 0 | 1 | 0 | 1 | =12 |

=== Judo ===
Judo has been included in the Olympic programme since 1964 with the exception of the 1968 Games. Iceland first participated in 1976 and has participated most times since then.

Bjarni Friðriksson won bronze in men's 95 kg in 1984.

| Games | Judoka | Events | Gold | Silver | Bronze | Total | Ranking |
|---|---|---|---|---|---|---|---|
| 1976 Montreal | 2 | 2/6 | 0 | 0 | 0 | 0 | |
| 1980 Moscow | 2 | 2/8 | 0 | 0 | 0 | 0 | |
| 1984 Los Angeles | 2 | 2/8 | 0 | 0 | 1 | 1 | =12 |
| 1988 Seoul | 2 | 2/7 | 0 | 0 | 0 | 0 | |
| 1992 Barcelona | 3 | 3/14 | 0 | 0 | 0 | 0 | |
| 1996 Atlanta | 1 | 1/14 | 0 | 0 | 0 | 0 | |
| 2008 Beijing | 1 | 1/14 | 0 | 0 | 0 | 0 | |
| 2012 London | 1 | 1/14 | 0 | 0 | 0 | 0 | |
| 2016 Rio de Janeiro | 1 | 1/14 | 0 | 0 | 0 | 0 | |
| Total | | | 0 | 0 | 1 | 1 | =52 |

=== Sailing ===
Sailing has been included in the Olympic programme since 1900 with the exception of the 1904 Games. Iceland has participated four times, first in 1984.

Their best placement in the sport was 22nd, by Ísleifur Friðriksson and Gunnlaugur Jónasson in men's 470 in 1988.

| Games | Sailors | Events | Gold | Silver | Bronze | Total | Ranking |
|---|---|---|---|---|---|---|---|
| 1984 Los Angeles | 2 | 1/7 | 0 | 0 | 0 | 0 | |
| 1988 Seoul | 2 | 1/8 | 0 | 0 | 0 | 0 | |
| 2000 Sydney | 1 | 1/11 | 0 | 0 | 0 | 0 | |
| 2004 Athens | 1 | 1/11 | 0 | 0 | 0 | 0 | |
| Total | | | 0 | 0 | 0 | 0 | – |

=== Shooting ===
Shooting was included in the inaugural 1896 Summer Olympic programme and has been included in all Summer Games since then except for 1904 and 1928. Iceland has participated four times, first in 1992.

Ásgeir Sigurgeirsson accomplished their best placement in the sport so far when he finished 14th in men's 10m air pistol in 2012.

| Games | Shooters | Events | Gold | Silver | Bronze | Total | Ranking |
|---|---|---|---|---|---|---|---|
| 1992 Barcelona | 1 | 1/13 | 0 | 0 | 0 | 0 | |
| 2000 Sydney | 1 | 1/17 | 0 | 0 | 0 | 0 | |
| 2012 London | 1 | 2/15 | 0 | 0 | 0 | 0 | |
| 2020 Tokyo | 1 | 1/15 | 0 | 0 | 0 | 0 | |
| Total | | | 0 | 0 | 0 | 0 | – |

=== Swimming ===
==== Long course swimming ====
Iceland first competed in swimming in 1948 and has competed in the sport most Games since then.

Örn Arnarson has achieved the best Icelandic placement in the sport, finishing 4th in men's 200m backstroke in 2000.

Hrafnhildur Lúthersdóttir has the highest placement in a women's event, she placed 6th in women's 100m breaststroke in 2016.

| Games | Swimmers | Events | Gold | Silver | Bronze | Total | Ranking |
|---|---|---|---|---|---|---|---|
| 1948 London | 8 | 6/11 | 0 | 0 | 0 | 0 | |
| 1960 Rome | 2 | 2/15 | 0 | 0 | 0 | 0 | |
| 1964 Tokyo | 2 | 3/18 | 0 | 0 | 0 | 0 | |
| 1968 Mexico City | 4 | 11/29 | 0 | 0 | 0 | 0 | |
| 1972 Munich | 4 | 8/29 | 0 | 0 | 0 | 0 | |
| 1976 Montreal | 3 | 9/26 | 0 | 0 | 0 | 0 | |
| 1984 Los Angeles | 4 | 7/29 | 0 | 0 | 0 | 0 | |
| 1988 Seoul | 6 | 16/31 | 0 | 0 | 0 | 0 | |
| 1992 Barcelona | 2 | 4/31 | 0 | 0 | 0 | 0 | |
| 1996 Atlanta | 3 | 3/32 | 0 | 0 | 0 | 0 | |
| 2000 Sydney | 9 | 14/32 | 0 | 0 | 0 | 0 | |
| 2004 Athens | 7 | 9/32 | 0 | 0 | 0 | 0 | |
| 2008 Beijing | 8 | 12/34 | 0 | 0 | 0 | 0 | |
| 2012 London | 7 | 12/34 | 0 | 0 | 0 | 0 | |
| 2016 Rio de Janeiro | 3 | 6/34 | 0 | 0 | 0 | 0 | |
| 2020 Tokyo | 2 | 3/37 | 0 | 0 | 0 | 0 | |
| Total | | | 0 | 0 | 0 | 0 | – |

==== Marathon swimming ====
Marathon swimming has been included in the Olympic programme since 2008.

Iceland has yet to participate in the discipline.

=== Water polo ===
Water polo has been included in the Olympic programme since 1900 with the exception of the 1904 Games. Iceland has participated once, in 1936 when they finished 15th.

| Games | Players | Events | Gold | Silver | Bronze | Total | Ranking |
|---|---|---|---|---|---|---|---|
| 1936 Berlin | 8 | 1/1 | 0 | 0 | 0 | 0 | |
| Total | | | 0 | 0 | 0 | 0 | – |

=== Weightlifting ===
Weightlifting was first included in the Olympic programme at the inaugural 1896 Summer Olympics. It was excluded from the 1900, 1908 and 1912 Games but have been included every other time. Iceland has participated in the sport four times, from 1968 to 1980.

Their best placement was 8th by Guðmundur Sigurðsson in men's 90 kg in 1976.

| Games | Weightlifters | Events | Gold | Silver | Bronze | Total | Ranking |
|---|---|---|---|---|---|---|---|
| 1968 Mexico City | 1 | 1/7 | 0 | 0 | 0 | 0 | |
| 1972 Munich | 2 | 2/9 | 0 | 0 | 0 | 0 | |
| 1976 Montreal | 1 | 1/9 | 0 | 0 | 0 | 0 | |
| 1980 Moscow | 3 | 3/10 | 0 | 0 | 0 | 0 | |
| Total | | | 0 | 0 | 0 | 0 | – |

=== Wrestling ===
Wrestling was included in the inaugural 1896 Summer Olympic programme and has been included in all Summer Games since then except for 1904. Iceland has participated in the sport twice, in 1908 and 1912.

Their best placement in the sport was 4th by Jóhannes Jósefsson in men's Greco-Roman middleweight in 1908.

| Games | Wrestlers | Events | Gold | Silver | Bronze | Total | Ranking |
|---|---|---|---|---|---|---|---|
| 1908 London | 1 | 1/9 | 0 | 0 | 0 | 0 | |
| 1912 Stockholm | 1 | 1/5 | 0 | 0 | 0 | 0 | |
| Total | | | 0 | 0 | 0 | 0 | – |

== Summary by Winter sport ==
Iceland has participated in every Winter Olympic Games since 1948 except for 1972. They have yet to win any Winter Olympic medals.

Their best placement in a Winter Olympic sport is 11th by Jón Kristjánsson, Gunnar Pétursson, Ívar Stefánsson and Ebenezer Thorarinsson in men's cross-country skiing relay in 1952.

Their best placement in a women's event is 16th by Steinunn Sæmundsdóttir in women's slalom in 1976.

Iceland has so far participated in 3 winter sports; Alpine skiing, Cross-country skiing and Ski jumping.

=== Alpine skiing ===
Alpine skiing has been included in the Olympic programme since 1936. Iceland first participated in the sport in 1948 and has continued to do so every Olympic Games since then except for 1972.

Their best placement is 16th by Steinunn Sæmundsdóttir in women's slalom in 1976.

Their best placement in a men's event is 17th by Eysteinn Þórðarson in men's slalom in 1960.

| Games | Alpine skiers | Events | Gold | Silver | Bronze | Total | Ranking |
|---|---|---|---|---|---|---|---|
| 1948 St. Moritz | 3 | 3/6 | 0 | 0 | 0 | 0 | |
| 1952 Oslo | 4 | 3/6 | 0 | 0 | 0 | 0 | |
| 1956 Cortina d'Ampezzo | 5 | 6/6 | 0 | 0 | 0 | 0 | |
| 1960 Squaw Valley | 3 | 3/6 | 0 | 0 | 0 | 0 | |
| 1964 Innsbruck | 3 | 2/6 | 0 | 0 | 0 | 0 | |
| 1968 Grenoble | 4 | 2/6 | 0 | 0 | 0 | 0 | |
| 1976 Innsbruck | 6 | 4/6 | 0 | 0 | 0 | 0 | |
| 1980 Lake Placid | 3 | 4/6 | 0 | 0 | 0 | 0 | |
| 1984 Sarajevo | 3 | 4/6 | 0 | 0 | 0 | 0 | |
| 1988 Calgary | 2 | 4/10 | 0 | 0 | 0 | 0 | |
| 1992 Albertville | 3 | 5/10 | 0 | 0 | 0 | 0 | |
| 1994 Lillehammer | 3 | 5/10 | 0 | 0 | 0 | 0 | |
| 1998 Nagano | 7 | 5/10 | 0 | 0 | 0 | 0 | |
| 2002 Salt Lake City | 6 | 7/10 | 0 | 0 | 0 | 0 | |
| 2006 Turin | 5 | 8/10 | 0 | 0 | 0 | 0 | |
| 2010 Vancouver | 4 | 5/10 | 0 | 0 | 0 | 0 | |
| 2014 Sochi | 4 | 5/10 | 0 | 0 | 0 | 0 | |
| 2018 Pyeongchang | 2 | 3/11 | 0 | 0 | 0 | 0 | |
| 2022 Beijing | 2 | 4/11 | 0 | 0 | 0 | 0 | |
| Total | | | 0 | 0 | 0 | 0 | – |

=== Cross-country skiing ===
Cross-country skiing has been was included in the Olympic programme since the inaugural 1924 Winter Olympics. Iceland first participated in the sport in 1952 and has participated in the sport most times since then.

Their best placement in the sport was by Jón Kristjánsson, Gunnar Pétursson, Ívar Stefánsson and Ebenezer Thorarinsson who finished 11th in men's relay in 1952.

Their best placement in a women's event was by Kristrún Guðnadóttir who finished 74th in women's sprint in 2022.

| Games | Skiers | Events | Gold | Silver | Bronze | Total | Ranking |
|---|---|---|---|---|---|---|---|
| 1952 Oslo | 6 | 3/4 | 0 | 0 | 0 | 0 | |
| 1956 Cortina d'Ampezzo | 2 | 2/6 | 0 | 0 | 0 | 0 | |
| 1964 Innsbruck | 2 | 2/7 | 0 | 0 | 0 | 0 | |
| 1976 Innsbruck | 2 | 3/7 | 0 | 0 | 0 | 0 | |
| 1980 Lake Placid | 3 | 2/7 | 0 | 0 | 0 | 0 | |
| 1984 Sarajevo | 2 | 2/8 | 0 | 0 | 0 | 0 | |
| 1988 Calgary | 1 | 2/8 | 0 | 0 | 0 | 0 | |
| 1992 Albertville | 2 | 4/10 | 0 | 0 | 0 | 0 | |
| 1994 Lillehammer | 2 | 4/10 | 0 | 0 | 0 | 0 | |
| 2014 Sochi | 1 | 2/12 | 0 | 0 | 0 | 0 | |
| 2018 Pyeongchang | 3 | 5/12 | 0 | 0 | 0 | 0 | |
| 2022 Beijing | 3 | 6/12 | 0 | 0 | 0 | 0 | |
| Total | | | 0 | 0 | 0 | 0 | – |

=== Ski jumping ===
Ski jumping has been included in the Olympic programme since the inaugural 1924 Winter Games. Iceland has participated three times. Their best placement was 35th by Ari Guðmundsson in the individual event in 1952.

| Games | Ski jumpers | Events | Gold | Silver | Bronze | Total | Ranking |
|---|---|---|---|---|---|---|---|
| 1948 St. Moritz | 1 | 1/1 | 0 | 0 | 0 | 0 | |
| 1952 Oslo | 1 | 1/1 | 0 | 0 | 0 | 0 | |
| 1960 Squaw Valley | 1 | 1/1 | 0 | 0 | 0 | 0 | |
| Total | | | 0 | 0 | 0 | 0 | – |

== See also ==
- List of flag bearers for Iceland at the Olympics
