= Iceland at the 1956 Winter Olympics =

- IOC code: ISL
- NOC: Olympic Committee of Iceland

in Cortina d'Ampezzo
- Competitors: 7 (6 men, 1 woman) in 2 sports
- Flag bearer: Valdimar Örnólfsson
- Medals: Gold 0 Silver 0 Bronze 0 Total 0

Winter Olympics appearances (overview)
- 1948; 1952; 1956; 1960; 1964; 1968; 1972; 1976; 1980; 1984; 1988; 1992; 1994; 1998; 2002; 2006; 2010; 2014; 2018; 2022; 2026

Iceland competed at the 1956 Winter Olympics in Cortina d'Ampezzo, Italy. This was the first time Iceland sent a woman to compete in the Winter Olympics.

== Alpine skiing ==
Men

Athlete	Event	Race 1		Race 2		Total	
Athlete	Event	Time	Rank	Time	Rank	Time	Rank
Steinþór Jakobsson	Giant Slalom					DSQ	–
Stefán Kristjánsson	Giant Slalom					3:59.1	62
Einar Kristjánsson	Giant Slalom					3:53.4	60
Eysteinn Þórðarson	Giant Slalom					3:49.4	56
Stefán Kristjánsson	Slalom	DSQ	–	–	–	DSQ	–
Einar Kristjánsson	Slalom	1:50.0	36	2:28.6	40	4:18.6	37
Eysteinn Þórðarson	Slalom	1:44.7	30	2:15.6	29	4:00.3	26

Women

Athlete	Event	Race 1		Race 2		Total	
Athlete	Event	Time	Rank	Time	Rank	Time	Rank
Jakobína Jakobsdóttir	Downhill					1:57.2	31
Jakobína Jakobsdóttir	Giant Slalom					2:39.4	41
Jakobína Jakobsdóttir	Slalom	1:06.4	23	DSQ	–	DSQ	–

== Cross-country skiing ==
Men

Event	Athlete	Race	
Event	Athlete	Time	Rank
15 km	Oddur Pétursson	1'02:36	61
15 km	Jón Kristjánsson	58:23	55
30 km	Oddur Pétursson	2'10:16	48
30 km	Jón Kristjánsson	2'00:52	39

== Sources ==
- Official Olympic Reports
- Olympic Winter Games 1956, full results by sports-reference.com
