= Iceland at the 1980 Winter Olympics =

- IOC code: ISL
- NOC: Olympic Committee of Iceland

in Lake Placid
- Competitors: 6 (5 men, 1 woman) in 2 sports
- Flag bearer: Haukur Sigurðsson
- Medals: Gold 0 Silver 0 Bronze 0 Total 0

Winter Olympics appearances (overview)
- 1948; 1952; 1956; 1960; 1964; 1968; 1972; 1976; 1980; 1984; 1988; 1992; 1994; 1998; 2002; 2006; 2010; 2014; 2018; 2022; 2026

Iceland competed at the 1980 Winter Olympics in Lake Placid, United States.

== Alpine skiing ==
Men

Athlete	Event	Race 1		Race 2		Total	
Athlete	Event	Time	Rank	Time	Rank	Time	Rank
Björn Olgeirsson	Giant Slalom	DNF	–	–	–	DNF	–
Sigurður Jónsson	Giant Slalom	1:27.33	42	1:26.46	32	2:53.79	35
Sigurður Jónsson	Slalom	n/a	?	DNF	–	DNF	–
Björn Olgeirsson	Slalom	n/a	?	DNF	–	DNF	–

Women

Athlete	Event	Race 1		Race 2		Total	
Athlete	Event	Time	Rank	Time	Rank	Time	Rank
Steinunn Sæmundsdóttir	Giant Slalom	1:23.52	35	1:35.89	28	2:59.41	29
Steinunn Sæmundsdóttir	Slalom	46.50	19	DNF	–	DNF	–

== Cross-country skiing ==
Men

Event	Athlete	Race	
Event	Athlete	Time	Rank
15 km	Ingólfur Jónsson	50:51.50	54
15 km	Þröstur Jóhannesson	49:37.75	51
15 km	Haukur Sigurðsson	47:44.00	47
30 km	Haukur Sigurðsson	DNF	–
30 km	Þröstur Jóhannesson	DNF	–
30 km	Ingólfur Jónsson	1'45:55.26	48

== Sources ==
- Official Olympic Reports
- Olympic Winter Games 1980, full results by sports-reference.com
