= Iceland at the 2002 Winter Olympics =

- IOC code: ISL
- NOC: National Olympic and Sports Association of Iceland
- Website: www.isi.is (in Icelandic)

in Salt Lake City, Utah
- Competitors: 6 (4 men, 2 women) in 1 sport
- Flag bearer: Dagný Linda Kristjánsdóttir
- Medals: Gold 0 Silver 0 Bronze 0 Total 0

Winter Olympics appearances (overview)
- 1948; 1952; 1956; 1960; 1964; 1968; 1972; 1976; 1980; 1984; 1988; 1992; 1994; 1998; 2002; 2006; 2010; 2014; 2018; 2022; 2026

Iceland was represented at the 2002 Winter Olympics in Salt Lake City, Utah, United States by the National Olympic and Sports Association of Iceland.

In total, six athletes represented Iceland, all in alpine skiing. Dagný Linda Kristjánsdóttir was the country's flagbearer at the opening ceremony on 8 February 2002.

== Alpine skiing ==
In total, six athletes represented Iceland at the 2002 Winter Olympics in Salt Lake City, Utah, United States, all in the alpine skiing events – Björgvin Björgvinsson, Kristinn Björnsson, Emma Furuvik, Jóhann Haraldsson, Dagný Linda Kristjánsdóttir and Kristinn Magnússon.

The women's downhill took place on 12 February 2002. Kristjánsdóttir completed the course in one minute 44.72 seconds to finish 31st overall.

The women's combined took place on 14 February 2002. Kristjánsdóttir completed her first slalom run in 50.24 seconds and her second in 47.92 seconds. However, she did not finish her downhill run.

The women's super-G took place on 17 February 2002. Kristjánsdóttir did not finish.

The women's slalom took place on 20 February 2002. Furuvik completed her first run in one minute 0.39 seconds and her second run in one minute 1.53 seconds for a combined time of two minutes 1.92 seconds to finish 33rd overall.

The men's giant slalom took place on 21 February 2002. Björgvinsson completed his first run in one minute 15.86 seconds, Haraldsson completed his first run in one minute 19.10 seconds and Magnússon completed his first run in one minute 17.50 seconds. Björgvinsson and Haraldsson did not finish their second runs. Magnússon completed his second run in one minute 16.29 seconds for a combined time of two minutes 33.79 seconds to finish 42nd overall.

The women's giant slalom took place on 22 February 2002. Kristjánsdóttir completed her first run in one minute 33.07 seconds. However, she did not start her second run.

The men's slalom took place on 23 February 2002. Björnsson completed his first run in 53.05 seconds and Haraldsson completed his first run in 56.98 seconds. Björgvinsson and Magnússon did not finish their first runs and did not take part in the second runs. Björnsson completed his second run in 56.77 seconds for a combined time of one minute 49.81 seconds to finish 21st overall and Haraldsson completed his second run in one minute 0.19 seconds for a combined time of one minute 57.17 seconds to finish 28th overall.

Men

Athlete	Event	Race 1	Race 2	Total	
Athlete	Event	Time	Time	Time	Rank
Jóhann Haraldsson	Giant Slalom	1:19.10	DNF	DNF	–
Kristinn Magnússon	Giant Slalom	1:17.50	1:16.29	2:33.79	42
Björgvin Björgvinsson	Giant Slalom	1:15.86	DNF	DNF	–
Kristinn Magnússon	Slalom	DNF	–	DNF	–
Björgvin Björgvinsson	Slalom	DNF	–	DNF	–
Jóhann Haraldsson	Slalom	56.98	1:00.19	1:57.17	28
Kristinn Björnsson	Slalom	53.05	56.76	1:49.81	21

Women

Athlete	Event	Race 1	Race 2	Total	
Athlete	Event	Time	Time	Time	Rank
Dagný Linda Kristjánsdóttir	Downhill			1:44.72	31
Dagný Linda Kristjánsdóttir	Super-G			DNF	–
Dagný Linda Kristjánsdóttir	Giant Slalom	1:33.07	DNF	DNF	–
Emma Furuvik	Slalom	1:00.39	1:01.53	2:01.92	33

Women's combined

Athlete	Downhill	Slalom		Total	
Athlete	Time	Time 1	Time 2	Total time	Rank
Dagný Linda Kristjánsdóttir	DNF	50.24	47.92	DNF	–
