= Iceland at the 2022 Winter Olympics =

- Flag of Iceland
- IOC code: ISL
- NOC: National Olympic and Sports Association of Iceland
- Website: www.isi.is (in Icelandic)

in Beijing, China 4–20 February 2022
- Competitors: 5 (3 men and 2 women) in 2 sports
- Flag bearers (opening): Kristrún Guðnadóttir; Sturla Snær Snorrason
- Flag bearer (closing): Snorri Einarsson
- Medals: Gold 0 Silver 0 Bronze 0 Total 0

Winter Olympics appearances (overview)
- 1948; 1952; 1956; 1960; 1964; 1968; 1972; 1976; 1980; 1984; 1988; 1992; 1994; 1998; 2002; 2006; 2010; 2014; 2018; 2022; 2026

Iceland competed at the 2022 Winter Olympics in Beijing, China, from 4 to 20 February 2022.

The Icelandic team consisted of three men and two women competing in two sports. Kristrún Guðnadóttir and Sturla Snær Snorrason were the country's flagbearer during the opening ceremony. Meanwhile cross-country skier Snorri Einarsson was the flagbearer during the closing ceremony.

Their best placement was 19th, in men's team sprint.

== Competitors ==
The following is the list of number of competitors participating at the Games per sport/discipline.

Sport	Men	Women	Total
Alpine skiing	1	1	2
Cross-country skiing	2	1	3
Total	3	2	5

== Alpine skiing ==
By meeting the basic qualification standards Iceland qualified one male and one female alpine skier.

Athlete	Event	Run 1		Run 2		Total	
Athlete	Event	Time	Rank	Time	Rank	Time	Rank
Sturla Snær Snorrason	Men's slalom	DNF		Did not advance			
Hólmfríður Dóra Friðgeirsdóttir	Women's giant slalom	DNF					
Hólmfríður Dóra Friðgeirsdóttir	Women's slalom	57.39	43	56.48	36	1:53.87	38
Hólmfríður Dóra Friðgeirsdóttir	Women's super-G	—N/a				1:17.41	32

== Cross-country skiing ==
Iceland qualified two male and one female cross-country skier. The Icelandic Olympic Committee selected Snorri Einarsson, Kristrún Guðnadóttir and Isak Stianson Pedersen.

Distance

Athlete	Event	Classical		Freestyle		Final		
Athlete	Event	Time	Rank	Time	Rank	Time	Deficit	Rank
Snorri Einarsson	Men's 15 km classical	—N/a				41:17.6	+3:22.8	36
Snorri Einarsson	Men's 30 km skiathlon	41:37.4	25	40:33.5	29	1:22:50.1	+6:40.3	29
Snorri Einarsson	Men's 50 km freestyle	—N/a				1:14:51.6	+3:18.9	23

Sprint

Athlete	Event	Qualification		Quarterfinal		Semifinal		Final	
Athlete	Event	Time	Rank	Time	Rank	Time	Rank	Time	Rank
Isak Stianson Pedersen	Men's individual	3:11.95	78	Did not advance					
Snorri Einarsson; Isak Stianson Pedersen	Men's team	—N/a				21:05.66	10	Did not advance	19
Kristrún Guðnadóttir	Women's individual	3:49.59	74	Did not advance					
