= Haukur Sigurðsson =

Haukur Sigurðsson can refer to:

- Haukur Sigurðsson (alpine skier) (born 1930), Icelandic alpine skier
- Haukur Sigurðsson (cross-country skier) (born 1956), Icelandic cross-country skier
- Haukur Páll Sigurðsson (born 1987), Icelandic footballer
