= Iceland at the 1960 Winter Olympics =

- IOC code: ISL (ICE used at these Games)
- NOC: Olympic Committee of Iceland

in Squaw Valley
- Competitors: 4 (men) in 2 sports
- Flag bearer: Kristinn Benediktsson
- Medals: Gold 0 Silver 0 Bronze 0 Total 0

Winter Olympics appearances (overview)
- 1948; 1952; 1956; 1960; 1964; 1968; 1972; 1976; 1980; 1984; 1988; 1992; 1994; 1998; 2002; 2006; 2010; 2014; 2018; 2022; 2026

Iceland participated at the 1960 Winter Olympics in Squaw Valley, United States, held between 18 and 28 February 1960. The country's participation in the Games marked its fourth appearance at the Winter Olympics since its debut in the 1948 Games.

The Icelandic team consisted of four athletes (all men) who competed in two sports. Skier Kristinn Benediktsson was the country's flag-bearer during the opening ceremony. The country did not win any medal in the Games, and as of the event, had not won any medal in the Winter Olympic Games.

== Background ==
The Icelandic Sports Federation of Íþróttasamband Íslands was established on 28 January 1912 and a National Olympic Committee (NOC) was first formed on 29 September 1921. It was replaced by a new NOC which was recognized by the International Olympic Committee (IOC) on 11 January 1935. The Íþróttasamband Íslands federation and the NOC of Iceland merged later in 1997 to become the National Olympic and Sports Association of Iceland. The nation made its debut in the Winter Olympics at the 1948 held in St.Moritz, Switzerland. This edition of the Games marked the nation's fourth appearance at the Winter Games.

The 1960 Winter Olympics were held in Squaw Valley, United States between 18 and 28 February 1960. The Icelandic delegation consisted of four athletes competing across two sports. Skier Kristinn Benediktsson was the country's flag-bearer in the Parade of Nations during the opening ceremony. The country did not win any medal in the Games, and as of the event, had not won any medal in the Winter Olympic Games.

== Competitors ==
There were four athletes (all men) who took part in the medal events across two sports.

Sport	Men	Women	Athletes
Alpine skiing	3	0	3
Ski jumping	1	0	1
Total	4	0	4

== Alpine skiing ==
Alpine skiing at the 1960 Winter Olympics took place at Squaw Valley Ski Resort and consisted of six events. Iceland entered three competitors all of whom competed across all three men's events. Of all the competitors, Eysteinn Þórðarson achieved the best result in the men's slalom event, finishing in 17th place overall.

Men

Athlete	Event	Race 1		Race 2		Total	
Athlete	Event	Time	Rank	Time	Rank	Time	Rank
Eysteinn Þórðarson	Downhill	—N/a				2:26.2	37
Jóhann Vilbergsson	Downhill	—N/a				2:24.6	33
Kristinn Benediktsson	Downhill	—N/a				2:26.0	36
Eysteinn Þórðarson	Giant Slalom	—N/a				1:59.1	27
Jóhann Vilbergsson	Giant Slalom	—N/a				DSQ	–
Kristinn Benediktsson	Giant Slalom	—N/a				2:06.1	34
Eysteinn Þórðarson	Slalom	1:17.0	20	1:07.9	17	2:24.9	17
Jóhann Vilbergsson	Slalom	1:25.7	40	DSQ	–	DSQ	–
Kristinn Benediktsson	Slalom	1:24.1	37	1:13.0	23	2:37.1	23

== Ski jumping ==
Ski jumping event was held on 21 February at Olympic Jumping Hill. Austria had four entrants to the competition. The lone competitor Skarphéðinn Guðmundsson finished third to last in the overall classification amongst the 45 competitors.

Athlete	Event	Jump 1			Jump 2			Total	
Athlete	Event	Distance	Points	Rank	Distance	Points	Rank	Points	Rank
Skarphéðinn Guðmundsson	Normal hill	64.0	73.0	43	64.0	82.7	41	155.7	43

== Sources ==
- Official Olympic Reports
- Olympic Winter Games 1960, full results by sports-reference.com
