= Pétursson =

Pétursson is an Icelandic patronymic, meaning son of Pétur (Peter). In Icelandic names, the name is not strictly a surname as it is not a family name, but a patronymic. The name refers to:

- Guðmundur Pétursson (born 1986), Icelandic football player
- Gunnar Pétursson (1930–2022), Icelandic Olympic cross-country skier
- Hallgrímur Pétursson (1614–1674), Icelandic pastor and poet
- Jóhann K. Pétursson (1913–1984), Icelandic performer known as “The Viking Giant”
- Jón Pétursson (1936–2003), Icelandic high jumper
- Margeir Pétursson (born 1960), Icelandic banker and chess grandmaster
- Oddur Pétursson (1931–2018), Icelandic Olympic cross-country skier
- Pétur Pétursson (born 1959), Icelandic professional football player
- Philip Petursson (1902–1988), Canadian politician from Manitoba; provincial legislator (1966–77)
- Sigurjón Pétursson (1888–1955), Icelandic wrestler
- Stefán Sölvi Pétursson (born 1986), Icelandic strongman competitor
- Þórarinn Ingi Pétursson (born 1977), Icelandic politician
