= Iceland at the 1964 Winter Olympics =

- IOC code: ISL
- NOC: Olympic Committee of Iceland

in Innsbruck
- Competitors: 5 in 2 sports
- Flag bearer: Valdimar Örnólfsson
- Medals: Gold 0 Silver 0 Bronze 0 Total 0

Winter Olympics appearances (overview)
- 1948; 1952; 1956; 1960; 1964; 1968; 1972; 1976; 1980; 1984; 1988; 1992; 1994; 1998; 2002; 2006; 2010; 2014; 2018; 2022; 2026

Iceland competed at the 1964 Winter Olympics in Innsbruck, Austria.

== Alpine skiing ==
Men

| Athlete | Event | Race | |
| Athlete | Event | Time | Rank |
|---|---|---|---|
| Jóhann Vilbergsson | Giant Slalom | DNF | – |
| Kristinn Benediktsson | Giant Slalom | 2:17.86 | 61 |
| Árni Sigurðsson | Giant Slalom | 2:14.90 | 56 |

Men's slalom

| Athlete | Qualifying | | | | Final | | | | | |
| Athlete | Time 1 | Rank | Time 2 | Rank | Time 1 | Rank | Time 2 | Rank | Total | Rank |
|---|---|---|---|---|---|---|---|---|---|---|
| Kristinn Benediktsson | DSQ | – | 1:00.57 | 27 | did not advance | | | | | |
| Árni Sigurðsson | 1:09.03 | 65 | 59.67 | 25 QF | 1:25.34 | 40 | 1:13.78 | 39 | 2:39.12 | 39 |
| Jóhann Vilbergsson | 1:00.39 | 46 | 1:02.23 | 34 | did not advance | | | | | |

== Cross-country skiing ==
Men

| Event | Athlete | Race | |
| Event | Athlete | Time | Rank |
|---|---|---|---|
| 15 km | Birgir Guðlaugsson | 1'04:53.9 | 67 |
| 15 km | Þórhallur Sveinsson | 1'00:14.9 | 55 |
| 30 km | Birgir Guðlaugsson | 1'54:00.3 | 64 |
| 30 km | Þórhallur Sveinsson | 1'51:34.4 | 61 |
