= Iceland at the 1984 Winter Olympics =

- IOC code: ISL
- NOC: Olympic Committee of Iceland

in Sarajevo
- Competitors: 5 (4 men, 1 woman) in 2 sports
- Flag bearer: Nanna Leifsdóttir
- Medals: Gold 0 Silver 0 Bronze 0 Total 0

Winter Olympics appearances (overview)
- 1948; 1952; 1956; 1960; 1964; 1968; 1972; 1976; 1980; 1984; 1988; 1992; 1994; 1998; 2002; 2006; 2010; 2014; 2018; 2022; 2026

Iceland competed at the 1984 Winter Olympics in Sarajevo, Yugoslavia.

== Alpine skiing ==
Men

Athlete	Event	Race 1		Race 2		Total	
Athlete	Event	Time	Rank	Time	Rank	Time	Rank
Guðmundur Jóhannsson	Giant Slalom	1:30.90	43	1:33.51	44	3:04.41	43
Árni Þór Árnason	Giant Slalom	1:30.05	40	1:31.21	40	3:01.26	40
Guðmundur Jóhannsson	Slalom	DNF	–	–	–	DNF	–
Árni Þór Árnason	Slalom	57.71	28	DNF	–	DNF	–

Women

Athlete	Event	Race 1		Race 2		Total	
Athlete	Event	Time	Rank	Time	Rank	Time	Rank
Nanna Leifsdóttir	Giant Slalom	1:14.82	43	1:20.02	38	2:34.84	38
Nanna Leifsdóttir	Slalom	DNF	–	–	–	DNF	–

== Cross-country skiing ==
Men

Event	Athlete	Race	
Event	Athlete	Time	Rank
15 km	Gottlieb Konráðsson	46:37.8	55
15 km	Einar Ólafsson	46:21.37	49
30 km	Einar Ólafsson	1'39:32.2	49
30 km	Gottlieb Konráðsson	1'37:48.2	39
