= Iceland at the 1992 Winter Olympics =

- IOC code: ISL
- NOC: Olympic Committee of Iceland

in Albertville
- Competitors: 5 (4 men, 1 woman) in 2 sports
- Flag bearer: Ásta Halldórsdóttir (alpine skiing)
- Medals: Gold 0 Silver 0 Bronze 0 Total 0

Winter Olympics appearances (overview)
- 1948; 1952; 1956; 1960; 1964; 1968; 1972; 1976; 1980; 1984; 1988; 1992; 1994; 1998; 2002; 2006; 2010; 2014; 2018; 2022; 2026

Iceland competed at the 1992 Winter Olympics in Albertville, France. Out of 5 participants, no medals were won.

== Competitors ==
The following is the list of number of competitors in the Games.

Sport	Men	Women	Total
Alpine skiing	2	1	3
Cross-country skiing	2	0	2
Total	4	1	5

== Alpine skiing ==
Men

Athlete	Event	Race 1	Race 2	Total	
Athlete	Event	Time	Time	Time	Rank
Örnólfur Valdimarsson	Super-G			1:20.64	51
Kristinn Björnsson	Super-G			1:17.89	43
Kristinn Björnsson	Giant Slalom	DNF	–	DNF	–
Örnólfur Valdimarsson	Giant Slalom	1:13.88	1:11.14	2:25.02	44
Kristinn Björnsson	Slalom	DNF	–	DNF	–
Örnólfur Valdimarsson	Slalom	58.12	58.36	1:56.48	35

Women

Athlete	Event	Race 1	Race 2	Total	
Athlete	Event	Time	Time	Time	Rank
Ásta Halldórsdóttir	Giant Slalom	1:14.55	1:15.48	2:30.03	30
Ásta Halldórsdóttir	Slalom	53.56	49.18	1:42.74	27

== Cross-country skiing ==
Men

Event	Athlete	Race	
Event	Athlete	Time	Rank
10 km C	Haukur Eiríksson	34:52.6	81
10 km C	Rögnvaldur Ingþórsson	32:04.6	59
15 km pursuit^{1} F	Haukur Eiríksson	53:40.3	80
15 km pursuit^{1} F	Rögnvaldur Ingþórsson	47:48.8	66
30 km C	Haukur Eiríksson	DNF	–
30 km C	Rögnvaldur Ingþórsson	1'39:23.9	69
50 km F	Rögnvaldur Ingþórsson	2'25:16.9	54

^{1} Starting delay based on 10 km results.
C = Classical style, F = Freestyle
