= Iceland at the 1988 Winter Olympics =

- IOC code: ISL
- NOC: Olympic Committee of Iceland

in Calgary
- Competitors: 3 (2 men, 1 woman) in 2 sports
- Flag bearer: Einar Ólafsson
- Medals: Gold 0 Silver 0 Bronze 0 Total 0

Winter Olympics appearances (overview)
- 1948; 1952; 1956; 1960; 1964; 1968; 1972; 1976; 1980; 1984; 1988; 1992; 1994; 1998; 2002; 2006; 2010; 2014; 2018; 2022; 2026

Iceland competed at the 1988 Winter Olympics in Calgary, Alberta, Canada.

== Competitors ==
The following is the list of number of competitors in the Games.

Sport	Men	Women	Total
Alpine skiing	1	1	2
Cross-country skiing	1	0	1
Total	2	1	3

== Alpine skiing ==
Athlete	Event	Run 1		Run 2		Total	
Athlete	Event	Time	Rank	Time	Rank	Time	Rank
Daníel Hilmarsson	Men's super-G	—N/a				DNF	
Daníel Hilmarsson	Men's giant slalom	1:13.15	50	1:09.59	41	2:22.74	42
Daníel Hilmarsson	Men's slalom	58.98	36	56.31	26	1:55.29	24
Guðrún Kristjánsdóttir	Women's giant slalom	DNF					

== Cross-country skiing ==
Athlete	Event	Race	
Athlete	Event	Time	Rank
Einar Ólafsson	Men's 30 km classical	1'39:56.3	65
Einar Ólafsson	Men's 50 km freestyle	2'18:21.9	44
