= Iceland at the 2026 Winter Olympics =

- Flag of Iceland
- IOC code: ISL
- NOC: National Olympic and Sports Association of Iceland
- Website: www.isi.is (in Icelandic)

in Milan and Cortina d'Ampezzo, Italy 6 February 2026 – 22 February 2026
- Competitors: 5 (2 men and 3 women) in 2 sports
- Flag bearers (opening): Jón Erik Sigurðsson & Elín Van Pelt
- Flag bearer (closing): Dagur Benediktsson
- Medals: Gold 0 Silver 0 Bronze 0 Total 0

Winter Olympics appearances (overview)
- 1948; 1952; 1956; 1960; 1964; 1968; 1972; 1976; 1980; 1984; 1988; 1992; 1994; 1998; 2002; 2006; 2010; 2014; 2018; 2022; 2026

Iceland competed at the 2026 Winter Olympics in Milan and Cortina d'Ampezzo, Italy, which was held from 6 to 22 February 2026.

Alpine skiers Jón Erik Sigurðsson and Elín Van Pelt were the country's flagbearer during the opening ceremony. Meanwhile, Dagur Benediktsson was the country's flagbearer during the closing ceremony.

== Competitors ==
The following is the list of number of competitors participating at the Games per sport/discipline.

Sport	Men	Women	Total
Alpine skiing	1	2	3
Cross-country skiing	1	1	2
Total	2	3	5

== Alpine skiing ==
Iceland qualified one male and one female alpine skier through the basic quota.

Athlete	Event	Run 1		Run 2		Total	
Athlete	Event	Time	Rank	Time	Rank	Time	Rank
Jón Erik Sigurðsson	Men's giant slalom	1:21.61	38	DNF			
Jón Erik Sigurðsson	Men's slalom	1:04.51	30	1:01.12	25	2:05.63	25
Elín Van Pelt	Women's giant slalom	1:10.28	48	1:16.93	43	2:27.21	43
Elín Van Pelt	Women's slalom	DNF					
Sonja Lí Kristinsdóttir	Women's giant slalom	1:12.31	52	DNF			
Sonja Lí Kristinsdóttir	Women's slalom	DNF					

== Cross-country skiing ==
Iceland qualified one male and one female cross-country skier through the basic quota.

Distance

Athlete	Event	Classical		Freestyle		Final		
Athlete	Event	Time	Rank	Time	Rank	Time	Deficit	Rank
Dagur Benediktsson	Men's 10 km freestyle	—N/a		24:18.1	69	—N/a		
Dagur Benediktsson	Men's skiathlon	27:57.8	67	LAP				66
Dagur Benediktsson	Men's 50 km classical	LAP	48	—N/a				
Kristrún Guðnadóttir	Women's 10 km freestyle	—N/a		DSQ		—N/a		

Sprint

Athlete	Event	Qualification		Quarterfinal		Semifinal		Final	
Athlete	Event	Time	Rank	Time	Rank	Time	Rank	Time	Rank
Dagur Benediktsson	Men's sprint	3:40.09	79	Did not advance					
Kristrún Guðnadóttir	Women's sprint	4:09.30	61	Did not advance					
