= Edda Hannesdóttir =

Icelandic triathlete

Personal information
- Born: 8 December 1994 (age 30); Reykjavík, Iceland
- Education: University of Iceland

Sport
- Country: Iceland
- Sport: Triathlon
- Club: Breiðablik

Guðlaug Edda Hannesdóttir (born 8 December 1994) is an Icelandic triathlete. She competed in the women's triathlon at the 2024 Summer Olympics in Paris, France. She was also selected as Iceland's flag bearer.

== Biography ==
Edda was born in 1994 in Reykjavík, Iceland. She grew up in Iceland and attended the University of Iceland, graduating with a degree in political science. She worked for a time as a journalist before competing full-time in the sport of triathlon, consisting of running, swimming and cycling events.

Little public funding is available for Icelandic sports, and as such, Edda often paid the costs herself to travel and attend international triathlon competitions. She trained with the Danish national triathlon team and in 2018, Edda won the women's championship at the World Triathlon Aquathlon Championships. The following year, she joined the Icelandic athletic club Breiðablik. In 2020, she won the Icelandic national championship in the 10K run with the all-time second-best mark at the competition.

In 2021, Edda suffered a major injury that required surgery and caused her to miss significant time. She rebounded in 2022, but then suffered a hip injury in early 2023 requiring another surgery, and again resulting in her missing significant time. She had hoped to qualify for the 2024 Summer Olympics, but her injury put it in doubt, with her telling World Athletics that she remembered "sitting in a hotel bed and I thought 'there's no chance it's going to happen'". However, she performed well at the Africa Cup in early 2024 and subsequently had a string of successes at competitions: in a five-week span, she won medals at three separate competitions in Asia. Her performances significantly improved her worldwide ranking, putting her in the top 180 and in contention for a potential Olympics spot. Through applications by the National Olympic and Sports Association of Iceland (ISI), she was ultimately chosen to compete at the 2024 Olympics by the Tripartite Commission, becoming the first Olympic triathlete from Iceland. Along with Hákon Þór Svavarsson, she was named the Iceland flag bearer at the Olympic opening ceremony.

Olympic Games
Preceded by Snæfríður Jórunnardóttir	Flagbearer for Iceland (with Hákon Þór Svarasson); Paris 2024	Succeeded by incumbent
