= Þröstur =

Þröstur is an Icelandic language masculine given name. Notable people with the name include:

- Þröstur Leó Gunnarsson (born 1961), Icelandic actor
- Þröstur Jóhannesson (born 1955), Icelandic cross-country skier
- Þröstur Þórhallsson (born 1969), Icelandic chess grandmaster
