= Viggósdóttir =

Viggósdóttir is an Icelandic patronymic meaning "daughter of Viggó". In Icelandic names, this is not a family name. Notable people with the name include:

- Glódís Perla Viggósdóttir (born 1995), Icelandic footballer
- Jórunn Viggósdóttir (born 1957), Icelandic alpine skier
