= Alfred Schindler =

Alfred Schindler may refer to:

- Alfred Schindler (industrialist) (1894–1987), American industrialist
- Alfred Schindler (skier) (born 1957), Swiss cross-country skier
