= Cross-country skiing at the 1980 Winter Olympics – Men's 15 kilometre =

Men's 15 kilometre at the XIII Olympic Winter Games
- Venue: Mount Van Hoevenberg
- Dates: 17 February 1980
- Competitors: 63 from 22 nations
- Winning time: 41:57.63

Medalists
| 1st place, gold medalist(s) | | Thomas Wassberg; Sweden |
| 2nd place, silver medalist(s) | | Juha Mieto; Finland |
| 3rd place, bronze medalist(s) | | Ove Aunli; Norway |

The men's 15 kilometre cross-country skiing competition at the 1980 Winter Olympics in Lake Placid, United States, was held on Sunday 17 February at the Mount Van Hoevenberg in Essex County, New York.

== Favourites ==
Józef Łuszczek of Poland was the 1978 World champion and Nikolay Bazhukov of the Soviet Union was the defending champion from the 1976 Olympics in Innsbruck, Austria.

== The Race ==
Each skier started at half a minute intervals, skiing the entire 15 kilometre course. The race developed into the closest duel in the history of cross-country skiing. Thomas Wassberg of Sweden and Finnish veteran Juha Mieto fought a tight battle for the gold medal. Wassberg started last of the 63 participants, half a minute behind Norwegian Ove Aunli. Mieto, wearing bib 54, started half a minute behind the reigning world champion at the distance, Polish skier Józef Łuszczek.

Wassberg started fast, and at the 5 km mark he had caught Aunli by 30 seconds and was in the lead, three seconds ahead of Mieto. Łuszczek also had a strong opener, only ten seconds behind the leader, closely followed by the 19-year old West German Jochen Behle and the 30 km winner Nikolay Zimyatov. At 10 km Wassberg had increased his lead to 4.8 seconds. Mieto, still in second place, had almost caught Łuszczek, starting half a minute in front of him, but the Pole was still in third place, now 30 seconds behind Wassberg. Aunli had been able to adjust his speed by following Wassberg and advanced from 13th to fifth place. Only two seconds separated the four fastest skiers behind Wassberg and Mieto 5 km from home. Behle had dropped down to ninth at 10 km and was out of contention for the medals.

Juha Mieto passed Łuszczek and left him behind before crossing the finish line in 41:57.64, beating Zimyatov's time by 36 seconds. Thomas Wassberg, still skiing together with Aunli, was told 500 m from home that he had a one second lead over Mieto, and, fighting desperately, crossed the finish line in 41:57.63. He won the race by the closest possible margin, one hundredth of a second. Aunli secured the bronze medal for Norway, beating Zimyatov by 5 seconds.

== Aftermath ==
Wassberg proposed to Mieto that they could cut their medals in two parts and then melt them together as a mixed gold-silver medal. Mieto politely thanked him, but said no to the idea, and ended the 1980 season by winning the unofficial Cross-Country World Cup for the second consecutive time. The International Ski Federation (FIS) decided shortly after the 1980 Olympics that all times in cross-country races would henceforth be rounded to the nearest tenth of a second.

== Results ==
| Rank | Bib | Name | Country | Time | Deficit |
|---|---|---|---|---|---|
| 1st place, gold medalist(s) | 63 | Thomas Wassberg | Sweden | 41:57.63 | – |
| 2nd place, silver medalist(s) | 54 | Juha Mieto | Finland | 41:57.64 | +0.01 |
| 3rd place, bronze medalist(s) | 62 | Ove Aunli | Norway | 42:28.62 | +30.99 |
| 4 | 41 | Nikolay Zimyatov | Soviet Union | 42:33.96 | +36.33 |
| 5 | 14 | Yevgeny Belyayev | Soviet Union | 42:46.02 | +48.39 |
| 6 | 53 | Józef Łuszczek | Poland | 42:59.03 | +1:01.40 |
| 7 | 2 | Alexander Zavyalov | Soviet Union | 43:00.81 | +1:03.18 |
| 8 | 33 | Harri Kirvesniemi | Finland | 43:02.01 | +1:04.38 |
| 9 | 30 | Oddvar Brå | Norway | 43:05.64 | +1:08.01 |
| 10 | 5 | Lars Erik Eriksen | Norway | 43:11.51 | +1:13.88 |
| 11 | 29 | Thomas Eriksson | Sweden | 43:11.88 | +1:14.25 |
| 12 | 40 | Jochen Behle | West Germany | 43:16.05 | +1:18.42 |
| 13 | 58 | Vasily Rochev | Soviet Union | 43:16.86 | +1:19.23 |
| 14 | 51 | Jean-Paul Pierrat | France | 43:32.53 | +1:34.90 |
| 15 | 59 | Ivan Lebanov | Bulgaria | 43:37.32 | +1:39.69 |
| 16 | 49 | Bill Koch | United States | 43:38.56 | +1:40.93 |
| 17 | 44 | Benny Kohlberg | Sweden | 43:39.22 | +1:41.59 |
| 18 | 10 | Sven-Erik Danielsson | Sweden | 43:41.21 | +1:43.58 |
| 19 | 11 | Kari Härkönen | Finland | 43:50.31 | +1:52.68 |
| 20 | 27 | Pertti Teurajärvi | Finland | 43:59.08 | +2:01.45 |
| 21 | 31 | Wolfgang Müller | West Germany | 44:02.54 | +2:04.91 |
| 22 | 36 | Stan Dunklee | United States | 44:03.84 | +2:06.21 |
| 23 | 39 | Jiří Švub | Czechoslovakia | 44:20.15 | +2:22.52 |
| 24 | 50 | Jiří Beran | Czechoslovakia | 44:27.78 | +2:30.15 |
| 25 | 22 | Tim Caldwell | United States | 44:30.41 | +2:32.78 |
| 26 | 7 | Peter Zipfel | West Germany | 44:38.23 | +2:40.60 |
| 27 | 55 | Franz Renggli | Switzerland | 44:38.66 | +2:41.03 |
| 28 | 47 | Paul Fargeix | France | 44:39.94 | +2:42.31 |
| 29 | 38 | Konrad Hallenbarter | Switzerland | 44:42.12 | +2:44.49 |
| 30 | 48 | Tore Gullen | Norway | 44:42.73 | +2:45.10 |
| 31 | 60 | Maurilio De Zolt | Italy | 44:43.19 | +2:45.56 |
| 32 | 15 | Hansüli Kreuzer | Switzerland | 44:44.66 | +2:47.03 |
| 33 | 12 | Jim Galanes | United States | 44:46.48 | +2:48.85 |
| 34 | 3 | Giorgio Vanzetta | Italy | 44:52.18 | +2:54.55 |
| 35 | 4 | Alfred Schindler | Switzerland | 44:52.93 | +2:55.30 |
| 36 | 52 | Dieter Notz | West Germany | 44:54.11 | +2:56.48 |
| 37 | 56 | Alf-Gerd Deckert | East Germany | 45:00.40 | +3:02.77 |
| 38 | 45 | Khristo Barzanov | Bulgaria | 45:05.21 | +3:07.58 |
| 39 | 37 | Giulio Capitanio | Italy | 45:10.40 | +3:12.77 |
| 40 | 1 | František Šimon | Czechoslovakia | 45:12.09 | +3:14.46 |
| 41 | 43 | Ivo Čarman | Yugoslavia | 45:14.32 | +3:16.69 |
| 42 | 17 | Gerard Durand-Poudret | France | 45:47.26 | +3:49.63 |
| 43 | 42 | Shiro Sato | Japan | 46:15.29 | +4:17.66 |
| 44 | 20 | Miloš Bečvář | Czechoslovakia | 46:18.13 | +4:20.50 |
| 45 | 8 | Dominique Locatelli | France | 47:06.72 | +5:09.09 |
| 46 | 25 | Tone Ðuričič | Yugoslavia | 47:38.45 | +5:40.82 |
| 47 | 21 | Haukur Sigurðsson | Iceland | 47:44.00 | +5:46.37 |
| 48 | 19 | Luvsandashiin Dorj | Mongolia | 48:05.78 | +6:08.15 |
| 49 | 35 | Charles MacIvor | Great Britain | 48:37.57 | +6:39.94 |
| 50 | 23 | Lin Guangho | China | 48:38.36 | +6:40.73 |
| 51 | 13 | Þröstur Jóhannesson | Iceland | 49:37.75 | +7:40.12 |
| 52 | 9 | Michael Goode | Great Britain | 49:47.20 | +7:49.57 |
| 53 | 28 | Emiliano Morlans | Spain | 50:42.33 | +8:44.70 |
| 54 | 32 | Ingólfur Jónsson | Iceland | 50:51.50 | +8:53.87 |
| 55 | 6 | José Giro | Spain | 51:30.06 | +9:32.43 |
| 56 | 34 | Marcos Luis Jerman | Argentina | 52:02.42 | +10:04.79 |
| 57 | 24 | Philip Jacklin | Great Britain | 52:14.17 | +10:16.54 |
| 58 | 46 | Kim Nam-young | South Korea | 53:05.55 | +11:07.92 |
| 59 | 18 | Hwang Byung-dae | South Korea | 53:05.60 | +11:07.97 |
| 60 | 26 | Martín Tomás Jerman | Argentina | 53:38.47 | +11:40.84 |
| 61 | 61 | Matías José Jerman | Argentina | 55:50.61 | +13:52.98 |
| | 16 | Giampaolo Rupil | Italy | DNF | |
| | 57 | Kim Dong-hwan | South Korea | DNF | |
