= Siglingasamband Íslands =

Governing body for watersports in Iceland

Siglingasamband Íslands is the governing body for watersports in Iceland. It encompasses the following Federations.

- Icelandic Sailing Association
- Icelandic Rowing Association
- Icelandic Canoeing Association
