= Iceland at the 2018 Winter Olympics =

- Flag of Iceland
- IOC code: ISL
- NOC: National Olympic and Sports Association of Iceland
- Website: www.isi.is (in Icelandic)

in Pyeongchang, South Korea 9–25 February 2018
- Competitors: 5 (3 men and 2 women) in 2 sports
- Flag bearer: Freydís Halla Einarsdóttir
- Medals: Gold 0 Silver 0 Bronze 0 Total 0

Winter Olympics appearances (overview)
- 1948; 1952; 1956; 1960; 1964; 1968; 1972; 1976; 1980; 1984; 1988; 1992; 1994; 1998; 2002; 2006; 2010; 2014; 2018; 2022; 2026; 2030

Iceland competed at the 2018 Winter Olympics in Pyeongchang, South Korea, from 9 to 25 February 2018, with five competitors in two sports.

== Competitors ==
The following is the list of number of competitors participating in the Icelandic delegation per sport.

Sport	Men	Women	Total
Alpine skiing	1	1	2
Cross-country skiing	2	1	3
Total	3	2	5

== Alpine skiing ==
Iceland qualified two athletes, one male and one female.

Athlete	Event	Run 1		Run 2		Total	
Athlete	Event	Time	Rank	Time	Rank	Time	Rank
Sturla Snær Snorrason	Men's giant slalom	DNF					
Sturla Snær Snorrason	Men's slalom	DNS					
Freydís Halla Einarsdóttir	Women's giant slalom	1:20.02	51	DNF			
Freydís Halla Einarsdóttir	Women's slalom	56.49	46	56.66	42	1:53.15	41

== Cross-country skiing ==
Iceland qualified three athletes, two male and one female.

Distance

Athlete	Event	Classical		Freestyle		Final		
Athlete	Event	Time	Rank	Time	Rank	Time	Deficit	Rank
Snorri Einarsson	Men's 15 km freestyle	—				37:05.6	+3:21.7	56
Snorri Einarsson	Men's 30 km skiathlon	44:02.3	55	38:54.8	53	1:23:33.9	+7:13.9	56
Snorri Einarsson	Men's 50 km classical	—				DNF		
Elsa Guðrún Jónsdóttir	Women's 10 km freestyle	—				31:12.8	+6:12.3	78

Sprint

Athlete	Event	Qualification		Quarterfinal		Semifinal		Final	
Athlete	Event	Time	Rank	Time	Rank	Time	Rank	Time	Rank
Isak Stianson Pedersen	Men's sprint	3:24.57	56	Did not advance					

== See also ==
- Iceland at the 2018 Summer Youth Olympics
- Iceland at the 2018 Winter Paralympics
