= Trausti =

Trausti is an Icelandic given name. It may refer to:

- Ásgeir Trausti (born 1992), Icelandic singer and musician
- Trausti Eyjólfsson (1927–2010), Icelandic sprinter
- Njáll Trausti Friðbertsson (born 1969), Icelandic politician
- Ari Trausti Guðmundsson (born 1948), Icelandic politician
- Jón Trausti Sigurðarson (born 1982), Icelandic marketing director and lawyer
- Trausti Stefánsson (born 1985), Icelandic sprinter
- Trausti Sveinsson (born 1943), Icelandic cross-country skier
