= Axel V. Tulinius =

Icelandic politician

1st President of ÍSÍ
- In office 1912–1926
- Succeeded by: Benedikt G. Waage

1st Chief Scout of BÍS
- In office 1925–1938

Personal details
- Born: 6 June 1865 Eskifjörður, Iceland
- Died: 8 December 1937 (aged 72) Copenhagen, Denmark
- Spouse: Guðrún Hallgrímsdóttir
- Children: 4

Axel Valdimar Tulinius (6 June 1865 – 8 December 1937) was an Icelandic politician. He was a member of Alþingi from 1900 to 1901 for the Progress Party (Icelandic: Framfaraflokkurinn). In 1912, he became the first president of the Sports Association of Iceland where he served until 1926. He was the first Chief Scout of Bandalag íslenskra skáta (Icelandic Boy and Girl Scout Association), having served from 1925 until 1937.

== Death ==
Axel died in Copenhagen on 8 December 1937 after illness.
