= Íris Guðmundsdóttir =

Icelandic alpine skier (born 1990)

Iris Guðmundsdóttir (born 13 May 1990 in Akureyri) is an Icelandic alpine skier who competed for Iceland at the 2010 Winter Olympics. She speaks Icelandic and English. She has been competing since 2005.

The events she participated in were the Ladies' Super Combined, Super-G, Slalom, and Giant Slalom.
