= Benedikt G. Waage =

Icelandic athlete

2nd President of ÍSÍ
- In office 1926–1962
- Preceded by: Axel V. Tulinius
- Succeeded by: Gísli Halldórsson

Personal details
- Born: 14 June 1889 Reykjavík, Iceland
- Died: 8 October 1966 (aged 77) Reykjavík, Iceland
- Spouse: Elísabet Einarsdóttir (m. 1915; div. 1932)
- Children: 4

Benedikt Waage Guðjónsson (14 June 1889 – 8 November 1966) was an Icelandic athlete and businessman. He was the chairman of the Sports Association of Iceland from 1926 to 1962 and a member of the International Olympic Committee from 1946 til his death. A well known athlete in Iceland in his youth, he was the first person to finish the Viðeyjarsund when he swam the 4.4 km route from Viðey to Reykjavík on 6 September 1914.
