= Iceland at the 1948 Winter Olympics =

- IOC code: ISL
- NOC: Olympic Committee of Iceland

in St. Moritz
- Competitors: 4 (men) in 2 sports
- Flag bearer: Hermann Stefánsson
- Medals: Gold 0 Silver 0 Bronze 0 Total 0

Winter Olympics appearances (overview)
- 1948; 1952; 1956; 1960; 1964; 1968; 1972; 1976; 1980; 1984; 1988; 1992; 1994; 1998; 2002; 2006; 2010; 2014; 2018; 2022; 2026

Iceland competed in the Winter Olympic Games for the first time at the 1948 Winter Olympics in St. Moritz, Switzerland.

== Alpine skiing ==
Men

Athlete	Event	Race 1		Race 2		Total	
Athlete	Event	Time	Rank	Time	Rank	Time	Rank
Guðmundur Guðmundsson	Downhill					4:57.0	98
Þórir Jónsson	Downhill					4:47.0	96
Magnús Brynjólfsson	Downhill					3:48.2	64
Guðmundur Guðmundsson	Slalom	2:09.4 (+0:05)	60	1:45.2	61	3:54.6	59

Men's combined

The downhill part of this event was held along with the main medal event of downhill skiing. For athletes competing in both events, the same time was used (see table above for the results). The slalom part of the event was held separate from the main medal event of slalom skiing (included in table below).

Athlete	Slalom			Total (downhill + slalom)	
Athlete	Time 1	Time 2	Rank	Points	Rank
Guðmundur Guðmundsson	2:15.8	1:24.8	64	105.11	67
Þórir Jónsson	1:57.0	1:20.5	58	89.40	65
Magnús Brynjólfsson	1:39.0	1:28.7 (+0:05)	49	52.76	48

== Ski jumping ==
Athlete	Event	Distance 1	Distance 2	Total points	Rank
Jónas Ásgeirsson	Normal hill	57.0	59.5	179.8	37
