= Þormóður Árni Jónsson =

Icelandic judoka (born 1983)

Personal information
- Born: 2 March 1983 (age 43)
- Occupation: Judoka

Sport
- Sport: Judo
Medal record
Men's Judo
Representing Iceland
Games of the Small States of Europe
Gold medal – first place	2017 San Marino	+100 kg

Profile at external databases
- JudoInside.com: 33116

Þormóður Árni Jónsson (often transliterated as Thormodur Arni Jonsson, born 2 March 1983 in Reykjavík) is an Icelandic judoka. He competed at the 2008 Summer Olympics in the +100kg category and lost in the round of 16 to Mohammad Reza Roudaki. Four years later in the 2012 Summer Olympics he again took part in the +100 kg tournament but lost in his first match to Rafael Silva.

He once again competed for Iceland at the 2016 Summer Olympics in Rio de Janeiro. He was defeated by Maciej Sarnacki of Poland in the round of 32. He was the flagbearer for Iceland during the Parade of Nations.

Olympic Games
Preceded by Ásdís Hjálmsdóttir	Flagbearer for Iceland; Rio de Janeiro 2016	Succeeded by Snæfríður Jórunnardóttir & Anton Sveinn McKee
