= Iceland at the 2014 Winter Olympics =

- IOC code: ISL
- NOC: National Olympic and Sports Association of Iceland
- Website: www.isi.is (in Icelandic)

in Sochi
- Competitors: 5 in 2 sports
- Flag bearers: Sævar Birgisson (opening); Helga María Vilhjálmsdóttir (closing)
- Medals: Gold 0 Silver 0 Bronze 0 Total 0

Winter Olympics appearances (overview)
- 1948; 1952; 1956; 1960; 1964; 1968; 1972; 1976; 1980; 1984; 1988; 1992; 1994; 1998; 2002; 2006; 2010; 2014; 2018; 2022; 2026; 2030

Iceland competed at the 2014 Winter Olympics in Sochi, Russia, from 7 to 23 February 2014. The Icelandic team consisted of five athletes in two sports. The team also consisted of eleven officials. For the first time since 1994, Iceland was represented in a sport other than alpine skiing.

== Alpine skiing ==
According to the final quota allocation released on 20 January 2014, Iceland qualified four athletes. The team was officially announced on 23 January 2014.

Athlete	Event	Run 1		Run 2		Total	
Athlete	Event	Time	Rank	Time	Rank	Time	Rank
Einar Kristgeirsson	Men's giant slalom	1:32.90	63	3:09.61	54	3:05.45	56
Einar Kristgeirsson	Men's slalom	54.04	49	DNF			
Brynjar Guðmundsson	Men's giant slalom	1:33.58	65	1:36.03	61	3:09.61	59
Brynjar Guðmundsson	Men's slalom	56.85	62	1:07.72	37	2:04.57	36
Erla Ásgeirsdóttir	Women's giant slalom	1:30.15	57	1:31.51	54	3:01.66	52
Erla Ásgeirsdóttir	Women's slalom	1:03.55	45	1:01.53	36	2:05.08	36
Helga María Vilhjálmsdóttir	Women's giant slalom	1:26.39	51	1:25.52	46	2:51.91	46
Helga María Vilhjálmsdóttir	Women's slalom	1:02.69	43	1:00.53	34	2:03.22	34
Helga María Vilhjálmsdóttir	Women's super-G	—				1:33.42	29

== Cross-country skiing ==
According to the final quota allocation released on 20 January 2014, Iceland qualified one athlete. The team was officially announced on 23 January 2014.

Distance

Athlete	Event	Final		
Athlete	Event	Time	Deficit	Rank
Sævar Birgisson	Men's 15 km classical	45:44.2	+7:14.5	74

Sprint

Athlete	Event	Qualification		Quarterfinal		Semifinal		Final	
Athlete	Event	Time	Rank	Time	Rank	Time	Rank	Time	Rank
Sævar Birgisson	Men's sprint	3:59.50	72	Did not advance					
