= Birgir Borgþórsson =

Icelandic weightlifter (born 1958)

Personal information
- Nationality: Icelandic
- Born: 2 November 1958 (age 67)

Sport
- Sport: Weightlifting

Birgir Borgþórsson (born 2 November 1958) is an Icelandic weightlifter. He competed in the men's heavyweight I event at the 1980 Summer Olympics and was the flag bearer for Iceland in the opening ceremony of those games.
