= Kim Nam-young =

South Korean cross-country skier

Personal information
- Nationality: South Korean
- Born: 19 November 1958 (age 66)

Sport
- Sport: Cross-country skiing

Kim Nam-young (born 19 November 1958) is a South Korean cross-country skier. He competed in the men's 15 kilometre event at the 1980 Winter Olympics.
