= Giampaolo Rupil =

Italian cross-country skier

Personal information
- Nationality: Italian
- Born: 24 July 1955 (age 69)

Sport
- Sport: Cross-country skiing

Giampaolo Rupil (born 24 July 1955) is an Italian cross-country skier. He competed in the men's 15 kilometre event at the 1980 Winter Olympics.
