= Iceland at the 2010 Winter Olympics =

- IOC code: ISL
- NOC: National Olympic and Sports Association of Iceland
- Website: www.isi.is (in Icelandic)

in Vancouver
- Competitors: 4 in 1 sport
- Flag bearer: Björgvin Björgvinsson
- Medals: Gold 0 Silver 0 Bronze 0 Total 0

Winter Olympics appearances (overview)
- 1948; 1952; 1956; 1960; 1964; 1968; 1972; 1976; 1980; 1984; 1988; 1992; 1994; 1998; 2002; 2006; 2010; 2014; 2018; 2022; 2026

Iceland participated at the 2010 Winter Olympics in Vancouver, British Columbia, Canada.

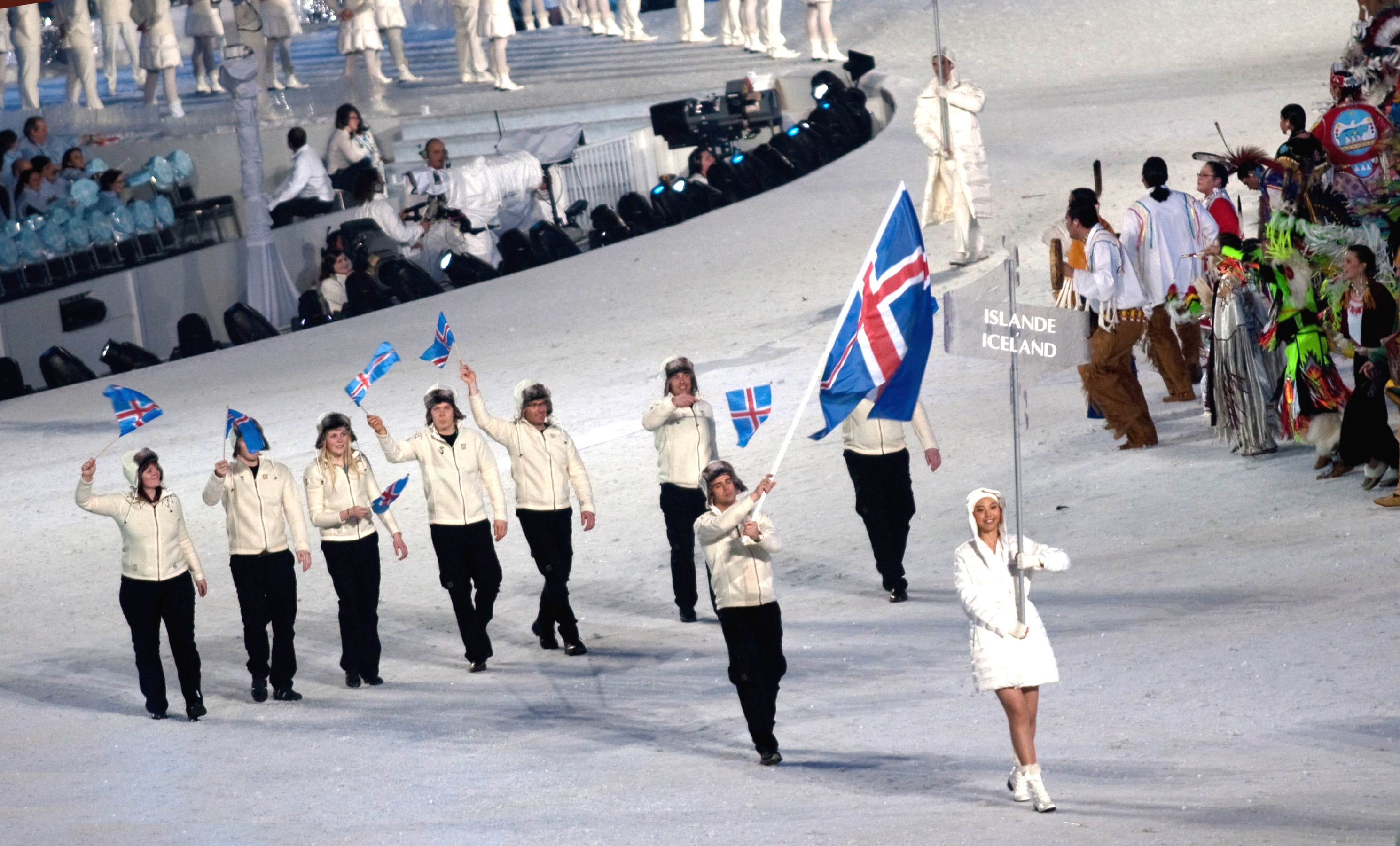
The athletes entering the stadium during the opening ceremonies.

== Alpine skiing ==
Athlete	Event	Run 1	Run 2	Final	
Athlete	Event	Time	Time	Time	Rank
Björgvin Björgvinsson	Men's slalom	DNF			
Björgvin Björgvinsson	Men's giant slalom	1:21.44	1:25.27	2:46.71	43
Stefán Jón Sigurgeirsson	Men's super-G			1:39.12	45
Stefán Jón Sigurgeirsson	Men's slalom	DNF			
Árni Þorvaldsson	Men's super-G			DNF	
Íris Guðmundsdóttir	Women's super-G			DNF	
Íris Guðmundsdóttir	Women's slalom	DNF			

== See also ==
- Iceland at the Olympics
- Iceland at the 2010 Winter Paralympics
