= Tore Gullen =

Norwegian cross-country skier

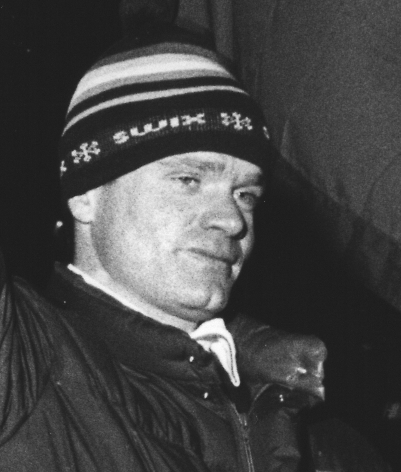

Personal information
- Nationality: Norway
- Born: 11 June 1949 (age 77) Jevnaker, Norway

Sport
- Sport: Skiing
- Club: Jevnaker IF

World Cup career
- Seasons: 1 – (1982)
- Indiv. starts: 1
- Indiv. podiums: 0
- Team starts: 0
- Overall titles: 0 – (56th in 1982)

Tore Gullen (born 11 June 1949) is a Norwegian cross-country skier. He was born in Jevnaker, and represented the club Jevnaker IF. He competed at the 1980 Winter Olympics in Lake Placid, where he placed 30th in the 15 km.

He was Norwegian champion in 15 km in 1977 and in 30 km in 1981.

== Cross-country skiing results ==
All results are sourced from the International Ski Federation (FIS).

=== Olympic Games ===
Year	Age	15 km	30 km	50 km	4 × 10 km relay
1980	30	30	—	—	—

=== World Cup ===
==== Season standings ====
Season	Age	Overall
1982	32	56
