= Iceland at the 2006 Winter Olympics =

- IOC code: ISL
- NOC: National Olympic and Sports Association of Iceland
- Website: www.isi.is (in Icelandic)

in Turin
- Competitors: 5 (4 men, 1 woman) in 1 sport
- Flag bearers: Dagný Linda Kristjánsdóttir (opening); Sindri M. Pálsson (closing)
- Medals: Gold 0 Silver 0 Bronze 0 Total 0

Winter Olympics appearances (overview)
- 1948; 1952; 1956; 1960; 1964; 1968; 1972; 1976; 1980; 1984; 1988; 1992; 1994; 1998; 2002; 2006; 2010; 2014; 2018; 2022; 2026

Iceland competed at the 2006 Winter Olympics in Turin, Italy. All five members of the team competed in alpine skiing.

== Alpine skiing ==
Athlete	Event	Final				
Athlete	Event	Run 1	Run 2	Run 3	Total	Rank
Björgvin Björgvinsson	Men's giant slalom	did not finish				
Björgvin Björgvinsson	Men's slalom	57.07	54.16	n/a	1:51.23	22
Dagný Linda Kristjánsdóttir	Women's downhill	n/a			1:59.43	23
Dagný Linda Kristjánsdóttir	Women's super-G	n/a			1:34.56	23
Dagný Linda Kristjánsdóttir	Women's giant slalom	did not finish				
Dagný Linda Kristjánsdóttir	Women's combined	44.23	48.37	1:59.43	3:04.25	28
Kristján Uni Óskarsson	Men's giant slalom	did not finish				
Kristján Uni Óskarsson	Men's slalom	58.92	55.78	n/a	1:54.70	28
Sindri M. Pálsson	Men's downhill	n/a			1:57.69	48
Sindri M. Pálsson	Men's slalom	did not finish				
Sindri M. Pálsson	Men's combined	1:46.04	did not finish			
Kristinn Ingi Valsson	Men's slalom	1:03.27	56.53	n/a	1:59.80	35

Note: In the men's combined, run 1 is the downhill, and runs 2 and 3 are the slalom. In the women's combined, run 1 and 2 are the slalom, and run 3 the downhill.
