= Sævar Birgisson =

Icelandic cross-country skier (born 1988)

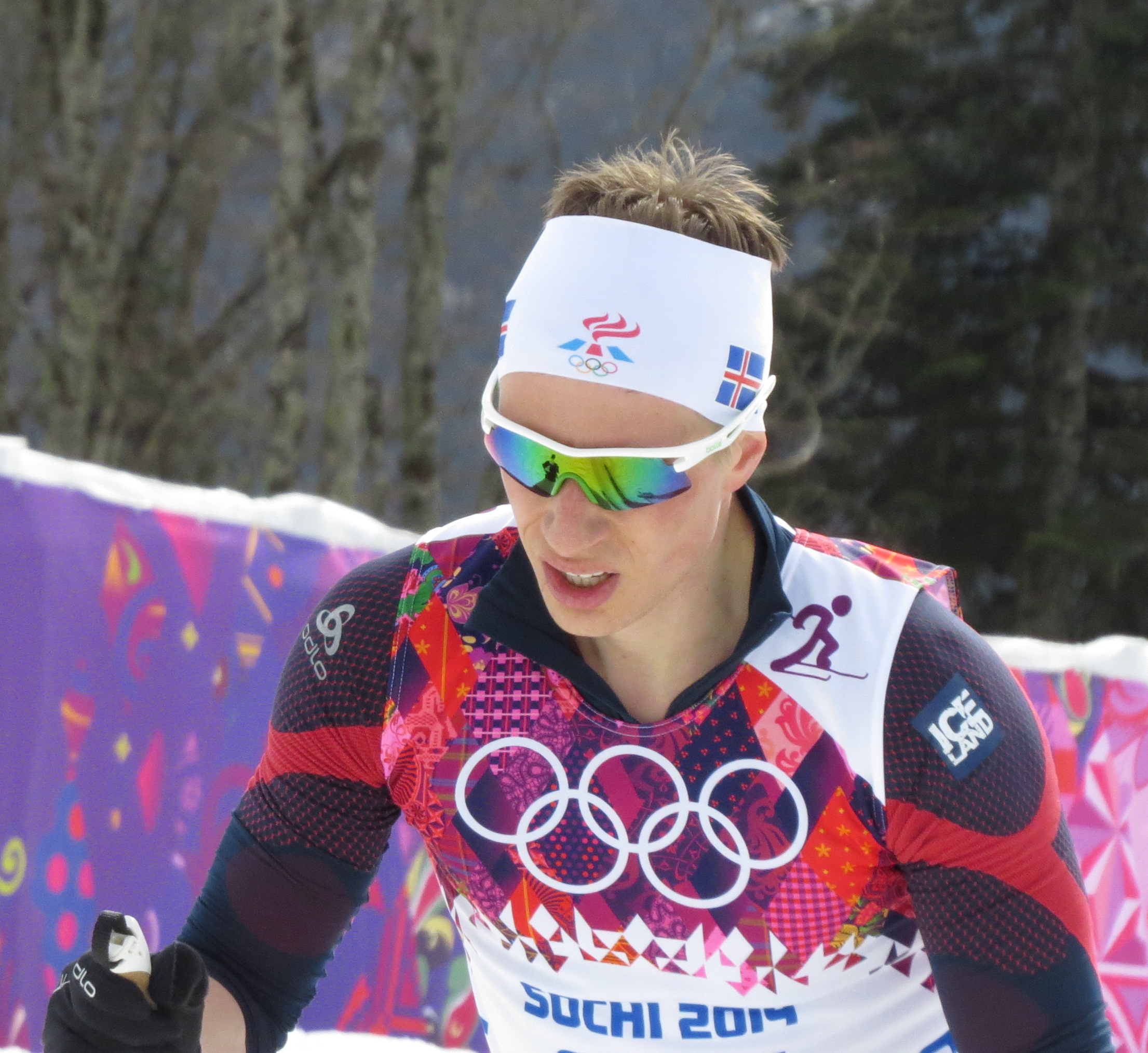
- Sævar Birgisson in 2014

Personal information
- Born: 15 February 1988 (age 38) Reykjavík, Iceland
- Height: 1.75 m (5 ft 9 in)
Medal record
Cross-country skiing
Representing Iceland

Sævar Birgisson (born 15 February 1988 in Reykjavík, Iceland) is a cross-country skier from Iceland. He competed for Iceland at the 2014 Winter Olympics in the 15 kilometre classical finishing in 74th place and in Sprint where he lost in the qualifying in 72nd place. The team will also consist of eleven officials.

Birgisson was also selected to carry the flag of Iceland during the opening ceremony.

Olympic Games
Preceded by Björgvin Björgvinsson	Flagbearer for Iceland; Sochi 2014	Succeeded by Incumbent
