= Lágheiði =

Mountain road in Skagafjörður, Iceland

Coordinates: 65.9711°N 18.9878°W

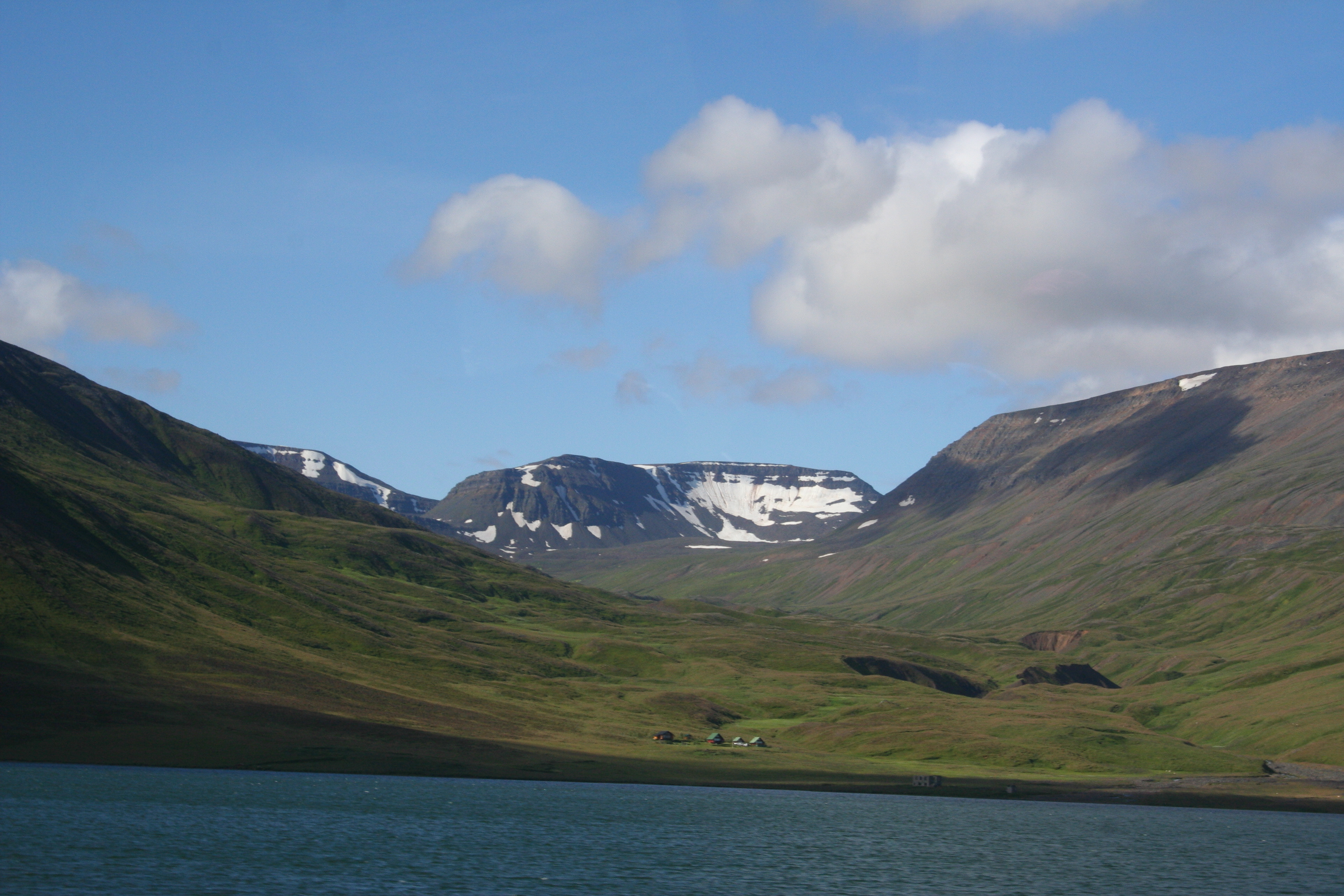
Lágheiði

Lágheiði (Icelandic pronunciation: [ˈlauɣˌheiːðɪ]) is a mountain road between Ólafsfjörður and Fljót in Skagafjörður, Iceland. Through the centuries this has been the route between this two settlements. The road was built over the plateau in 1945 and it was the road for cars to connect with Ólafsfjörður. Due to heavy snows in the winter, the road is generally closed from September to May.

One folktale is known from the heath - Dýrhóll [ˈtirˌhoutl̥].
