= Iceland at the 1994 Winter Olympics =

- IOC code: ISL
- NOC: Olympic Committee of Iceland

in Lillehammer
- Competitors: 5 in 2 sports
- Flag bearer: Ásta Halldórsdóttir
- Medals: Gold 0 Silver 0 Bronze 0 Total 0

Winter Olympics appearances (overview)
- 1948; 1952; 1956; 1960; 1964; 1968; 1972; 1976; 1980; 1984; 1988; 1992; 1994; 1998; 2002; 2006; 2010; 2014; 2018; 2022; 2026

Iceland competed at the 1994 Winter Olympics in Lillehammer, Norway.

== Competitors ==
The following is the list of number of competitors in the Games.

Sport	Men	Women	Total
Alpine skiing	2	1	3
Cross-country skiing	2	0	2
Total	4	1	5

== Alpine skiing ==
Men

Athlete	Event	Final				
Athlete	Event	Run 1	Run 2	Run 3	Total	Rank
Haukur Arnórsson	Slalom	DNF			DNF	
Kristinn Björnsson	Giant Slalom	1:33.88	1:27.28		3:01.16	30
Kristinn Björnsson	Slalom	DNF			DNF	

Women

Athlete	Event	Final				
Athlete	Event	Run 1	Run 2	Run 3	Total	Rank
Ásta Halldórsdóttir	Super-G				DNF	
Ásta Halldórsdóttir	Giant Slalom	1:28.02	1:16.18		2:44.20	23
Ásta Halldórsdóttir	Slalom	1:01.86	59.69		2:01.55	20

== Cross-country skiing ==
Men

Athlete	Event	Final					
Athlete	Event	Start	Rank	Time	Rank	Total	Rank
Rögnvaldur Ingþórsson	10 km Classical					28:51.2	78
Rögnvaldur Ingþórsson	15 km Free Pursuit	+04:31	78	42:25.2	69	+11:07.4	69
Rögnvaldur Ingþórsson	30 km Free					1:27:45.8	67
Rögnvaldur Ingþórsson	50 km Classical					2:32:52.9	60
Daníel Jakobsson	10 km Classical					27:09.7	50
Daníel Jakobsson	15 km Free Pursuit	+02:49	50	40:08.0	50	+7:08.2	49
Daníel Jakobsson	30 km Free					1:20:34.5	38
Daníel Jakobsson	50 km Classical					2:24:57.0	55

== See also ==
- Iceland at the 1994 Winter Paralympics
