= Snæfríður Jórunnardóttir =

Icelandic swimmer (born 2000)

Personal information
- Nationality: Icelandic
- Born: 31 October 2000 (age 25)

Sport
- Sport: Swimming
Medal record
Women's swimming
Representing Iceland
Games of the Small States of Europe
Gold medal – first place	2025 Andorra la Vella	200 m freestyle
Gold medal – first place	2025 Andorra la Vella	4×100 m freestyle
Gold medal – first place	2025 Andorra la Vella	4×200 m freestyle
Gold medal – first place	2025 Andorra la Vella	4×100 m medley
Silver medal – second place	2025 Andorra la Vella	100 m freestyle
Silver medal – second place	2025 Andorra la Vella	400 m freestyle
Silver medal – second place	2025 Andorra la Vella	50 m butterfly

Snæfríður Sól Jórunnardóttir (born 31 October 2000) is an Icelandic swimmer.

Olympic Games
Preceded by Þormóður Árni Jónsson	Flagbearer for Iceland (with Anton Sveinn McKee); Tokyo 2020	Succeeded by Edda Hannesdóttir and Hákon Þór Svavarsson
