= Snorri Einarsson =

Norwegian-Icelandic cross-country skier (born 1986)

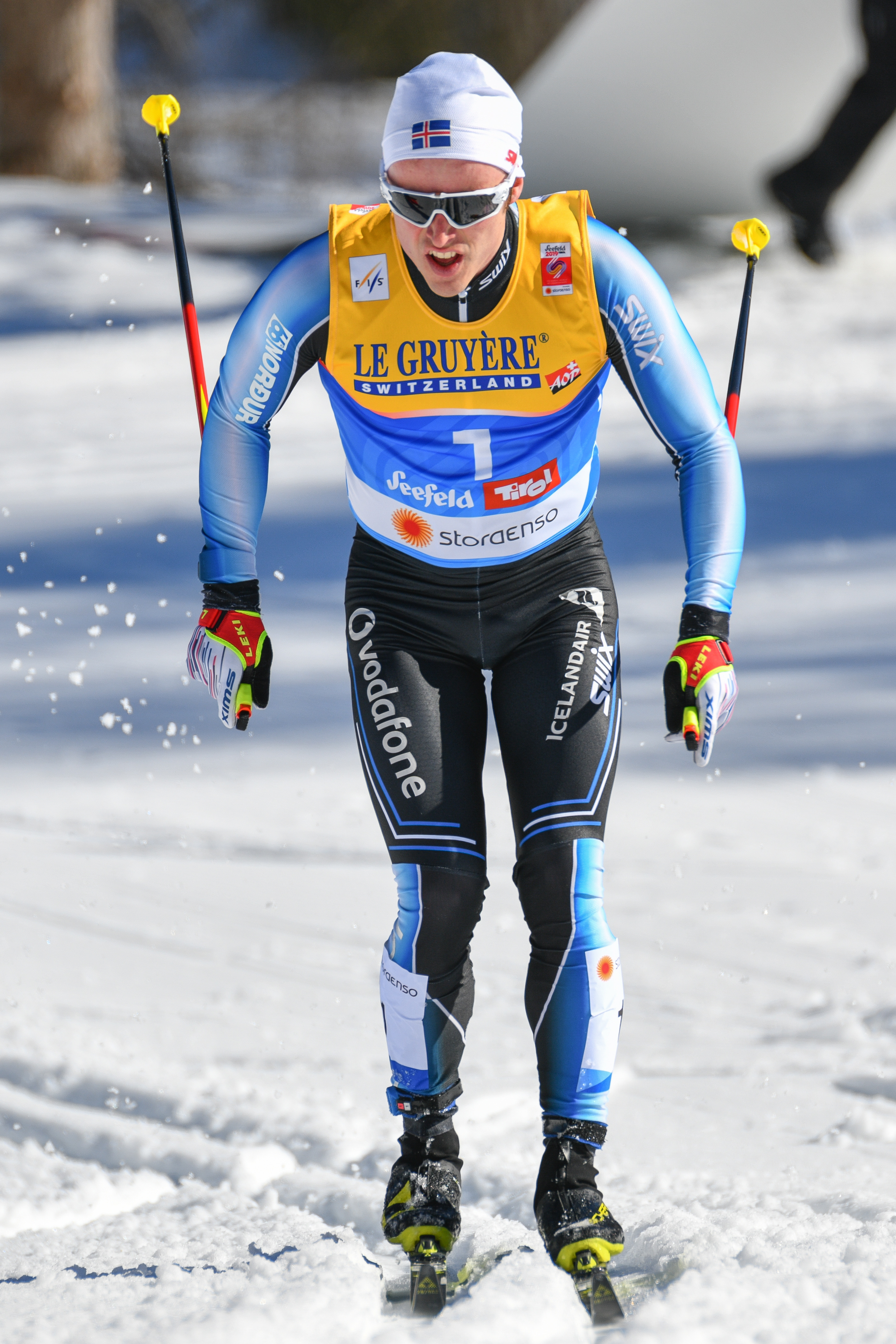
- Einarsson in 2019

Personal information
- Full name: Snorri Eythor Einarsson
- Nationality: Iceland
- Born: 21 February 1986 (age 40) Tromsø, Norway

Sport
- Sport: Skiing
- Club: Tromsø SK

World Cup career
- Seasons: 10 – (2010–2013, 2017–present)
- Indiv. starts: 77
- Indiv. podiums: 0
- Team starts: 1
- Team podiums: 0
- Overall titles: 0 – (108th in 2020)
- Discipline titles: 0
- Updated on 21 March 2022

Snorri Eythor Einarsson (born 21 February 1986) is an Icelandic cross-country skier born in Norway. His father is Icelandic, and his mother is Norwegian; he now competes for that nation. He now lives in Isafjörður, Iceland with his girlfriend and four children. He competed for Iceland at the 2018 Winter Olympics. Einarsson has participated in the Tour de Ski representing both Norway and Iceland. His 18th place in the 50 km in the Seefeld World Championships and 15th place at the 2023 World Championships make him the most accomplished cross-country skier in Iceland ever.

In Norway he represented the club Tromsø SK.

== Cross-country skiing results ==
All results are sourced from the International Ski Federation (FIS).

=== Olympic Games ===
Year	Age	15 km individual	30 km skiathlon	50 km mass start	Sprint	4 × 10 km relay	Team sprint
2018	32	56	56	DNF	—	—	—
2022	36	36	29	23^{[a]}	—	—	—

^{a} Distance reduced to 30 km due to weather conditions.

=== World Championships ===
Year	Age	15 km individual	30 km skiathlon	50 km mass start	Sprint	4 × 10 km relay	Team sprint
2017	31	43	39	—	—	—	—
2019	33	43	39	18	—	—	—
2021	35	59	57	—	—	—	27
2023	37	22	28	15	—	—	22

=== World Cup ===
==== Season standings ====
Season	Age	Discipline standings			Ski Tour standings			
Season	Age	Overall	Distance	Sprint	Nordic Opening	Tour de Ski	Ski Tour 2020	World Cup Final
2010	24	NC	NC	—	—N/a	—	—N/a	—
2011	25	125	83	NC	—	30	—N/a	—
2012	26	NC	NC	—	—	—	—N/a	—
2013	27	164	NC	106	—	DNF	—N/a	—
2017	31	NC	NC	—	—	—	—N/a	—
2018	32	109	84	NC	27	—	—N/a	—
2019	33	121	84	NC	58	37	—N/a	—
2020	34	108	63	NC	63	—	38	—N/a
2021	35	133	93	NC	58	41	—N/a	—N/a
2022	36	153	90	NC	—N/a	DNF	—N/a	—N/a
2023	37				—N/a	—	—N/a	—N/a
