= Birgir Guðlaugsson =

Icelandic cross-country skier (1941–2007)

Personal information
- Nationality: Icelandic
- Born: 28 April 1941; Siglufjörður, Iceland
- Died: 26 November 2007 (aged 66); Siglufjörður, Iceland

Sport
- Sport: Cross-country skiing

Birgir Guðlaugsson (28 April 1941 – 26 November 2007) was an Icelandic cross-country skier. He competed in the men's 15 kilometre event at the 1964 Winter Olympics.
