= Kristinn Magnússon =

Icelandic alpine skier (born 1981)

Personal information
- Nationality: Icelandic
- Born: 10 January 1981 (age 44); Akureyri, Iceland

Sport
- Sport: Alpine skiing

Kristinn Magnússon (born 10 January 1981) is an Icelandic alpine skier. He competed in two events at the 2002 Winter Olympics.
