= Haukur Sigurðsson (alpine skier) =

Icelandic alpine skier (1930–2006)

Personal information
- Nationality: Icelandic
- Born: 28 July 1930 Ólafsfjörður, Iceland
- Died: 16 November 2006 (aged 76)

Sport
- Sport: Alpine skiing

Haukur Sigurðsson (28 July 1930 – 16 November 2006) was an Icelandic alpine skier. He competed in three events at the 1952 Winter Olympics.
