= Icelandic Sailing Association =

Sporting association

Icelandic Sailing Association ISA
- IOC nation: Iceland (ISL)
- Sport: Sailing, Rowing, Canoeing, Kayaking
- Official website: www.silsport.is

HISTORY
- Year of formation: 1973

DEMOGRAPHICS
- Number of Sailing, Rowing, Canoeing, Kayaking clubs: Approx. 10

AFFILIATIONS
- International federation: International Sailing Federation (ISAF)
- Continental association: EUROSAF
- National Olympic Committee: National Olympic and Sports Association of Iceland

ELECTED
- President: Ulfur Hrobjartsson

SECRETARIAT
- Address: Reykjavik
- Secretary General: Anna O Kristofersdottir

FINANCE
- Company status: Association

The Icelandic Sailing Association is the national governing body for the sports of sailing, rowing, canoeing, and kayaking in Iceland.
