= Emma Furuvik =

Icelandic alpine skier (born 1981)

Personal information
- Nationality: Icelandic
- Born: 1 October 1981 (age 45) Stockholm, Sweden

Sport
- Sport: Alpine skiing

Emma Furuvik (born 1 October 1981) is an Icelandic alpine skier. She competed in the women's slalom at the 2002 Winter Olympics.
