= Ingólfur Jónsson (skier) =

Icelandic cross-country skier (born 1952)

Personal information
- Nationality: Icelandic
- Born: 17 October 1952 (age 72)

Sport
- Sport: Cross-country skiing

Ingólfur Jónsson (born 17 October 1952) is an Icelandic cross-country skier. He competed in the men's 15 kilometre event at the 1980 Winter Olympics.
