= Gottlieb Konráðsson =

Icelandic cross-country skier (born 1961)

Personal information
- Nationality: Icelandic
- Born: 9 February 1961 (age 64)

Sport
- Sport: Cross-country skiing

Gottlieb Konráðsson (born 9 February 1961) is an Icelandic cross-country skier. He competed in the men's 15 kilometre event at the 1984 Winter Olympics.
