= Stefán Kristjánsson (alpine skier) =

Icelandic alpine skier (1924–1990)

Personal information
- Nationality: Icelandic
- Born: 30 June 1924; Ólafsfjörður, Iceland
- Died: 1 September 1990 (aged 66); Reykjavík, Iceland

Sport
- Sport: Alpine skiing

Stefán Kristjánsson (30 June 1924 – 1 September 1990) was an Icelandic alpine skier. He competed at the 1952 Winter Olympics and the 1956 Winter Olympics.
