= Ásgeir Eyjólfsson =

Icelandic skier (1929–2021)

Personal information
- Nationality: Icelandic
- Born: 4 May 1929; Reykjavík, Iceland
- Died: 21 April 2021 (aged 91)

Sport
- Sport: Alpine skiing

Ásgeir Eyjólfsson (4 May 1929 – 21 April 2021) was an Icelandic alpine skier. He was born in Reykjavík and first started skiing at the age of 13. He became one of the best known skiers in Iceland and competed in three events at the 1952 Winter Olympics
