= Jóhann Haraldsson =

Icelandic alpine skier (born 1979)

Personal information
- Nationality: Icelandic
- Born: 7 September 1979 (age 45); Reykjavík, Iceland

Sport
- Sport: Alpine skiing

Jóhann Haraldsson (born 7 September 1979) is an Icelandic alpine skier. He competed in two events at the 2002 Winter Olympics.
