= Jakobína Jakobsdóttir =

Icelandic alpine skier (born 1932)

Personal information
- Full name: Jakobína Valdís Jakobsdóttir
- Nationality: Icelandic
- Born: 21 November 1932 (age 93) Ísafjörður, Iceland

Sport
- Sport: Alpine skiing

Jakobína Valdís Jakobsdóttir (born 21 November 1932) is an Icelandic alpine skier. She was the first female athlete to compete for Iceland in the World Ski Championship and Winter Olympics.

She competed in FIS Alpine World Ski Championships 1954 and in three events at the 1956 Winter Olympics.
