= Örnólfur Valdimarsson =

Icelandic alpine skier (born 1964)

Personal information
- Nationality: Icelandic
- Born: 4 November 1964 (age 60); Reykjavík, Iceland

Sport
- Sport: Alpine skiing

Örnólfur Valdimarsson (born 4 November 1964) is an Icelandic alpine skier. He competed in three events at the 1992 Winter Olympics.
