= Halldór Matthíasson =

Icelandic cross-country skier (born 1949)

Personal information
- Nationality: Icelandic
- Born: 8 July 1949 (age 75)

Sport
- Sport: Cross-country skiing

Halldór Matthíasson (born 8 July 1949) is an Icelandic cross-country skier. He competed in the men's 15 kilometre event at the 1976 Winter Olympics.
