= Tómas Leifsson =

Icelandic skier (born 1953)

Personal information
- Nationality: Icelandic
- Born: 20 January 1953 (age 72); Akureyri, Iceland

Sport
- Sport: Alpine skiing

Tómas Leifsson (born 20 January 1953) is an Icelandic alpine skier. He competed in two events at the 1976 Winter Olympics.
