= Haukur Jóhannsson =

Icelandic alpine skier (born 1953)

Personal information
- Nationality: Icelandic
- Born: 17 January 1953 (age 73) Akureyri, Iceland

Sport
- Sport: Alpine skiing

Haukur Jóhannsson (born 17 January 1953) is an Icelandic alpine skier. He competed in two events at the 1976 Winter Olympics.
