= Alfred Schindler (skier) =

Swiss cross-country skier

Personal information
- Nationality: Swiss
- Born: 13 April 1957 (age 67)

Sport
- Sport: Cross-country skiing

Alfred Schindler (born 13 April 1957) is a Swiss cross-country skier. He competed in the men's 15 kilometre event at the 1980 Winter Olympics. He also competed at the 1982 World Championship in Oslo.
