= Björn Olgeirsson =

Icelandic alpine skier (born 1962)

Personal information
- Nationality: Icelandic
- Born: 23 February 1962 (age 63); Húsavík, Iceland

Sport
- Sport: Alpine skiing

Björn Olgeirsson (born 23 February 1962) is an Icelandic alpine skier. He competed in two events at the 1980 Winter Olympics. At the 1980 Winter Olympics, he appeared in two competitions, but failed to finish both.
