= Þórhallur Sveinsson =

Icelandic cross-country skier (born 1944)

Personal information
- Nationality: Icelandic
- Born: 13 June 1944 (age 80); Siglufjörður, Iceland

Sport
- Sport: Cross-country skiing

Þórhallur Sveinsson (born 13 June 1944) is an Icelandic cross-country skier. He competed in the men's 15 kilometre event at the 1964 Winter Olympics.
