= Jón Karl Sigurðsson =

Icelandic alpine skier (1932–2019)

Personal information
- Nationality: Icelandic
- Born: 11 April 1932
- Died: 27 April 2019 (aged 87)

Sport
- Sport: Alpine skiing

Jón Karl Sigurðsson (11 April 1932 – 27 April 2019) was an Icelandic alpine skier. He competed in three events at the 1952 Winter Olympics.
