= Skarphéðinn Guðmundsson =

Icelandic ski jumper

Personal information
- Nationality: Icelandic
- Born: 7 April 1930; Siglufjörður, Iceland
- Died: 20 January 2003 (aged 72); Hrafnista, Iceland

Sport
- Sport: Ski jumping

Skarphéðinn Guðmundsson (7 April 1930 – 20 January 2003) was an Icelandic ski jumper. He competed in the individual event at the 1960 Winter Olympics.
