= Ari Guðmundsson =

Icelandic swimmer

Personal information
- Born: September 14, 1927
- Died: September 6, 2003 (aged 75)

Sport
- Sport: Swimming

Ari Guðmundsson (14 September 1927 – 6 September 2003) was an Icelandic swimmer who competed in the 1940s and 1950s. He competed in two freestyle swimming events at the 1948 Summer Olympics.
