= Jórunn Viggósdóttir =

Icelandic alpine skier (born 1957)

Personal information
- Nationality: Icelandic
- Born: 31 December 1957 (age 67)

Sport
- Sport: Alpine skiing

Jórunn Viggósdóttir (born 31 December 1957) is an Icelandic alpine skier. She competed in two events at the 1976 Winter Olympics.
