= Árni Óðinsson =

Icelandic skier (born 1950)

Personal information
- Nationality: Icelandic
- Born: 24 February 1950 (age 75); Akureyri, Iceland

Sport
- Sport: Alpine skiing

Árni Óðinsson (born 24 February 1950) is an Icelandic alpine skier. He competed in the men's giant slalom at the 1976 Winter Olympics. He was the oldest Icelandic alpinist, and ensign of the Icelandic team at these Games.
