= Ebeneser Þórarinsson =

Icelandic cross-country skier (1931–2003)

Ebenezer Þórarinsson
Personal information
- Born: 27 August 1931 Ísafjörður, Kingdom of Iceland
- Died: 9 February 2003 (aged 71) Ísafjörður, Iceland

Sport
- Sport: Cross-country skiing
- Club: Ármann, Skutulsfirði

Ebeneser Þórarinsson (first name sometimes spelled Ebenezer) (27 August 1931 – 9 February 2003) was an Icelandic cross-country skier who competed in the 1950s. He finished 40th in the 18 km event at the 1952 Winter Olympics in Oslo.
