= Trausti Sveinsson =

Icelandic cross-country skier (born 1943)

Personal information
- Nationality: Icelandic
- Born: 29 January 1943 (age 82)

Sport
- Sport: Cross-country skiing

Trausti Sveinsson (born 29 January 1943) is an Icelandic cross-country skier. He competed in the men's 15 kilometre event at the 1976 Winter Olympics.
