= Eysteinn Þórðarson =

Icelandic alpine skier (1934–2009)

Personal information
- Nationality: Icelandic
- Born: 3 March 1934 Ólafsfjörður, Iceland
- Died: 24 December 2009 (aged 75) Angels Camp, California, United States

Sport
- Sport: Alpine skiing

Eysteinn Þórðarson (3 March 1934 – 24 December 2009) was an Icelandic alpine skier. He competed at the 1956 Winter Olympics and the 1960 Winter Olympics.
