= Sigurður Jónsson (alpine skier) =

Icelandic alpine skier (1959–1996)

Sigurður Hjálmar Jónsson
Personal information
- Nationality: Icelandic
- Born: 27 March 1959; Ísafjörður, Iceland
- Died: 7 May 1996 (aged 37)

Sport
- Sport: Alpine skiing

Sigurður Hjálmar Jónsson (27 March 1959 – 7 May 1996) was an Icelandic alpine skier. He competed at the 1976 Winter Olympics and the 1980 Winter Olympics. He won the Icelandic championship in slalom in 1980.
