= Ívar Stefánsson =

Icelandic cross-country skier (1927–2009)

Ívar Stefánsson (8 October 1927 – 17 July 2009) was an Icelandic cross-country skier who competed in the 1950s. He finished 29th in the 50 km (31 mi) event at the 1952 Winter Olympics in Oslo.
