= Freydís Halla Einarsdóttir =

Icelandic alpine skier (born 1994)

Freydis Halla Einarsdóttir
Personal information
- Born: 3 October 1994 (age 32) Reykjavík

Skiing career
- Sport: Alpine skiing ♀

Freydis Halla Einarsdóttir (born 3 October 1994) is an Icelandic alpine ski racer. She was a student at Plymouth State University in Plymouth, New Hampshire.

She is currently studying medicine in Iceland and published an article in the Icelandic Journal of medicine in May 2023 about the effect of obesity on the outcome of surgical aortic valve replacement for aortic stenosis.

She competed at the 2015 World Championships in Beaver Creek, USA, in the slalom.

She competed for Iceland in alpine skiing at the 2018 Winter Olympics, in Pyeongchang, South Korea. During the opening ceremony, she was the flag bearer for her country in the Parade of Nations.
