= Þröstur Jóhannesson =

Icelandic cross-country skier (born 1955)

Personal information
- Nationality: Icelandic
- Born: 21 August 1955 (age 69)

Sport
- Sport: Cross-country skiing
- Club: Ármann, Skutulsfirði

Þröstur Jóhannesson (born 21 August 1955) is an Icelandic former cross-country skier. He competed in the men's 15 kilometre event at the 1980 Winter Olympics.
