= Jón Kristjánsson =

Icelandic cross-country skier (1920–1996)

Jón Kristjánsson (17 May 1920 – 16 February 1996) was an Icelandic cross-country skier who competed in the 1950s. At the 1952 Winter Olympics in Oslo, he finished 45th in the 18 km event and 30th in the 50 km event. He also competed at the 1956 Winter Olympics.
