= Ólafsfjörður =

- Town
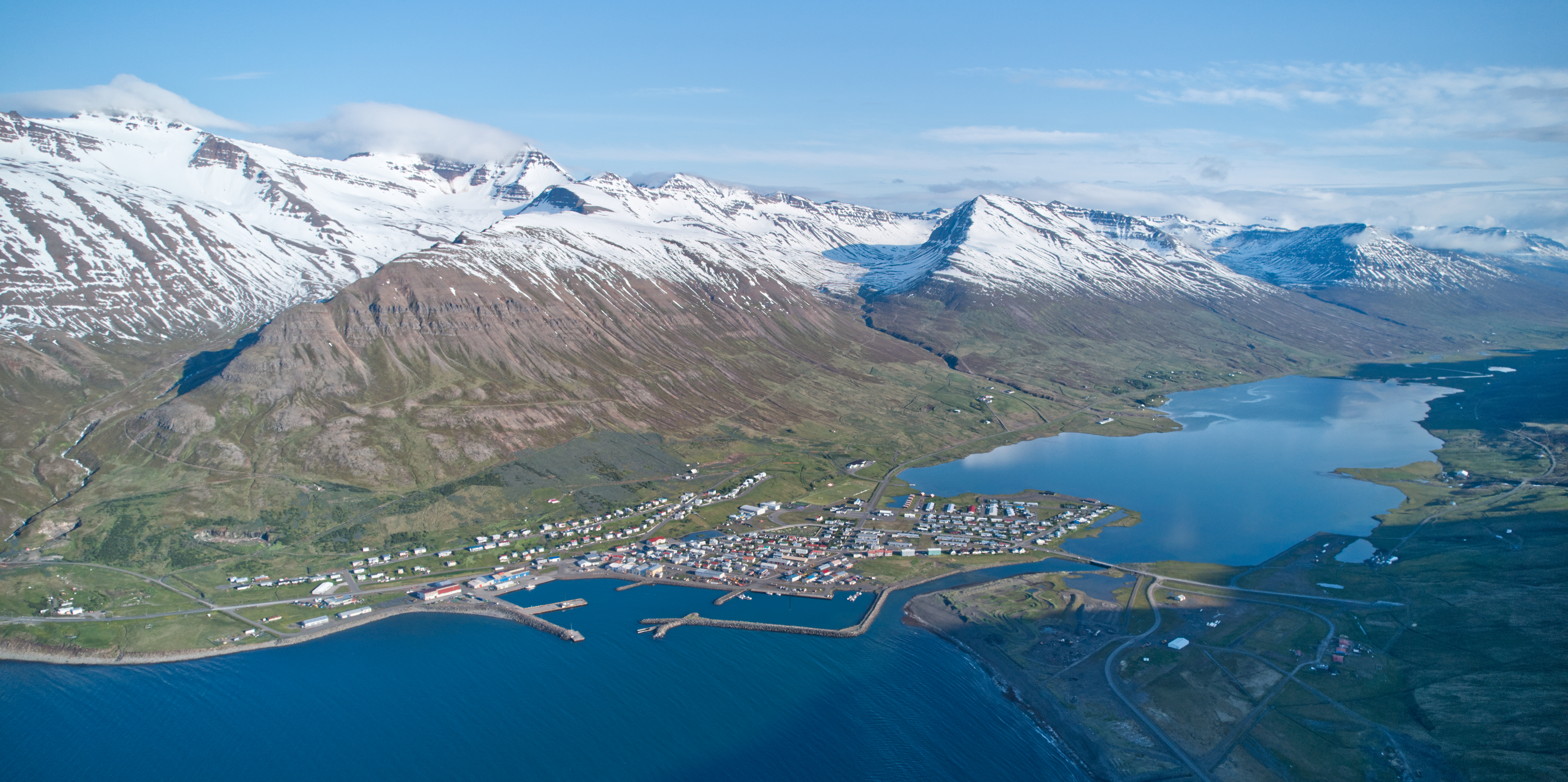
- Ólafsfjörður in 2025

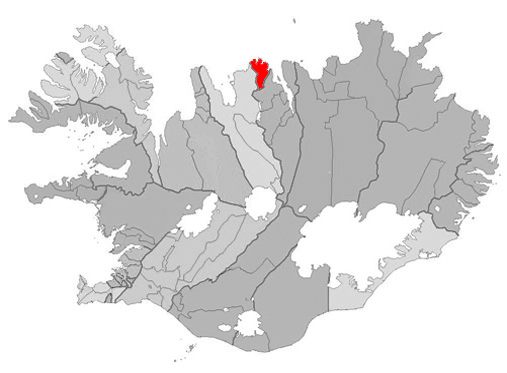
- Location of the Municipality of Fjallabyggð

- Location of Ólafsfjörður
- Coordinates: 66°04′N 18°39′W
- Country: Iceland
- Constituency: Northeast Constituency
- Region: Northeastern Region
- Municipality: Fjallabyggð

Population (January 2019)
  - Total: 785
- Postal code: 625
- Website: Municipal website

Ólafsfjarðarbaer
- Former Municipality
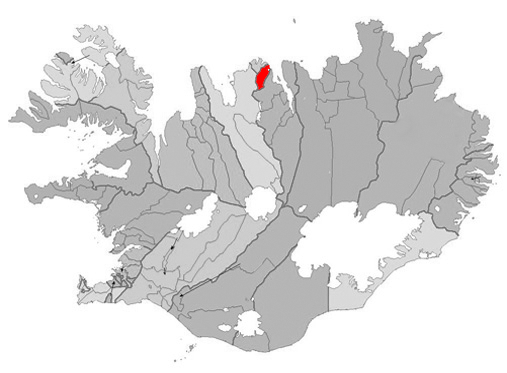
- Location of the former Municipality of Ólafsfjarðarbaer
- Coordinates: 66°11′N 18°53′W
- Country: Iceland

Ólafsfjörður (Icelandic pronunciation: [ˈouːˌlafsˌfjœrðʏr̥]) is a town in the northeast of Iceland located at the mouth of the fjord Eyjafjörður.

The town is connected to Dalvík on Eyjafjörður by the 3.5 km one-lane Múli tunnel (the Múlagöng) and to Siglufjörður by the 11 km Héðinsfjörður Tunnels, opened in 2010. Fishing is the main industry in the town; several trawlers make their home in the town's harbor.

The municipalities of Ólafsfjörður and Siglufjörður merged in 2006 to form the municipality of Fjallabyggð, which literally means Mountain Settlement.

== History ==
The town grew around the herring industry that was very strong in the 1940s and 1950s, but the herring are gone now. Ólafsfjörður attained municipal status (kaupstaðurréttindi) on 31 October 1944. The number of inhabitants amounted to 192 in 1910, to 336 in 1920, to 559 in 1930, to 736 in 1940, to 947 in 1950, to 905 in 1960, to 1,086 in 1970 and to 1.181 in 1979. In 1989, the town had 1,191 inhabitants.

Ólafsfjörður was connected by road for the first time in 1940, when the horse trail through Lágheiði was improved, enabling cars to cross the heath. Previously, ships, seaplanes, and horses provided the transport. The Múlagöng or Ólafsfjarðargöng tunnel was opened on March 1, 1991, connecting Dalvík and Ólafsfjörður. It has a length of 3,400 m (11,155 ft). On 2 October 2010, the Héðinsfjörður Tunnels opened, providing an all-year rapid connection to Siglufjörður.

Ólafsfjarðarkirkja [ˈouːˌlafsˌfjarðarˌcʰɪr̥ca], a comparatively large Protestant church with 120 seats, was inaugurated in 1915. Two thirds of the whole population of the town could be seated inside at that time. There is a sight-worthy monument dedicated to drowned seamen in front of the church.

== Economy ==
Tourism has become an important industry in Ólafsfjörður but it still relies heavily on its fishing industry and to name some of the fishing companies there are "norlandia ehf" that dries fish and exports them to Nigeria.

== Sports ==
The town offers sports and activities for people of all ages. Some of its sports clubs are:

- Golf (Golfklúbbur Ólafsfjarðar)
- Equestrian (Hestamannafélagið Gýnari, Ólafsfirði)
- Football/Soccer (Knattspyrnufélag Fjallabyggðar)
- Skiing (Skíðafélag Ólafsfjarðar)
- Shooting (Skotfélag Ólafsfjarðar)
- Snowmobile (Vélsleðafélag Ólafsfjarðar)

The Ólafsfjörður swimming pool is heated, like all outdoor pools in Iceland, and is open all year round. There is a helical water slide.

The Alpine facility in Tindaöxl [ˈtʰɪntaˌœkstl̥] is right above the town, and is open in the winter when there is enough snow. A lift takes people up the slopes.
