= Einar Ólafsson (skier) =

Icelandic cross-country skier (born 1962)

Personal information
- Born: 1 May 1962 (age 64) Ísafjörður, Iceland
- Height: 174 cm (5 ft 9 in)
- Weight: 73 kg (161 lb)

Sport
- Sport: Cross-country skiing
- Club: Skíðafélag Ísfirðinga

Einar Ólafsson (born 1 May 1962) is a retired Icelandic cross-country skier. He competed at the 1984 and 1988 Winter Olympics in 15–50 km events and placed 44–65. He was the flag bearer for Iceland at the 1988 games at Calgary. He won multiple national championships during his career.
