= Oddur Pétursson =

Icelandic cross-country skier (1931–2018)

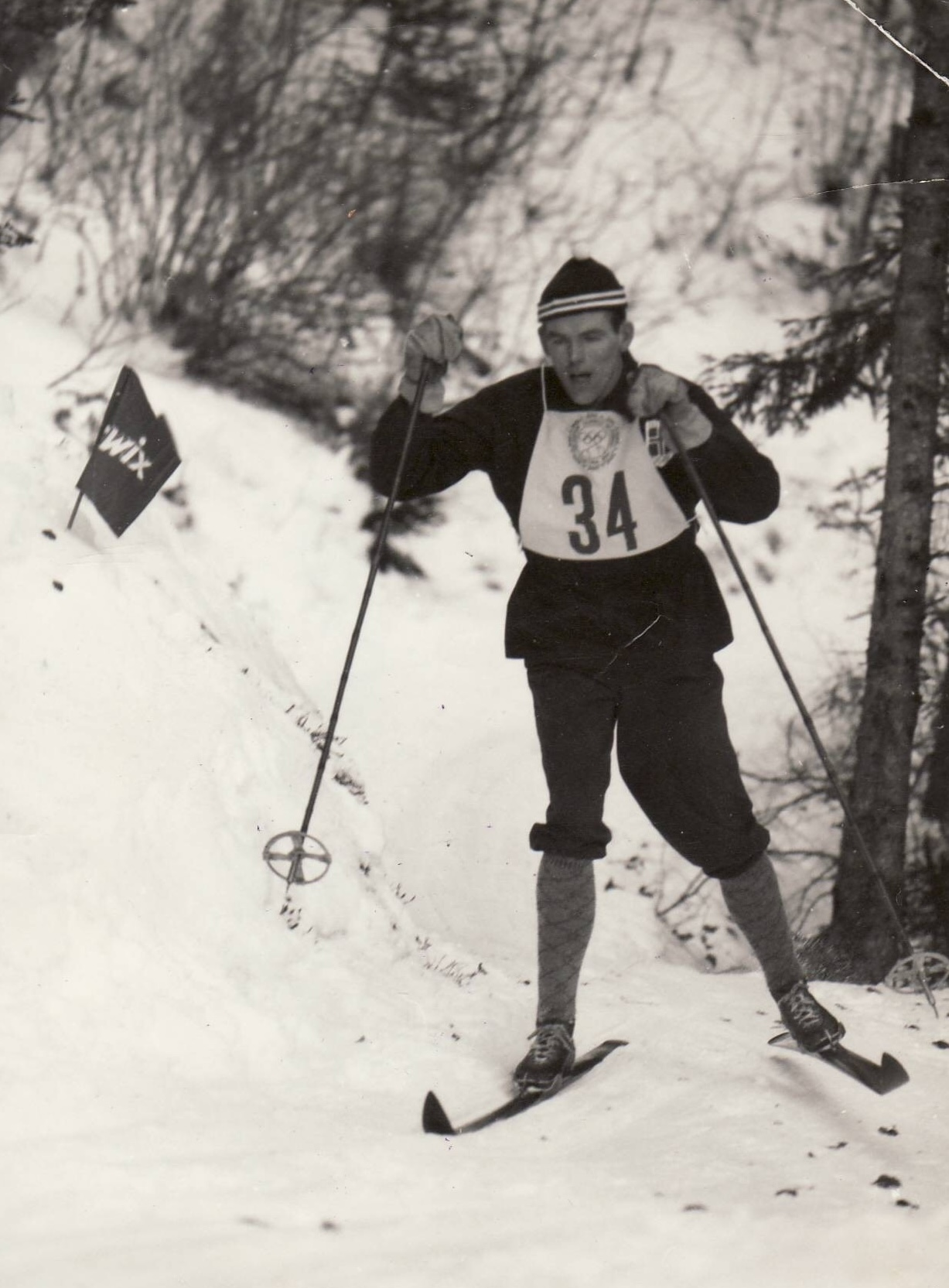
- Pétursson, at the Winter Olympics, Cortina, Italy in 1956

Personal information
- Born: 2 July 1931 Ísafjörður, Kingdom of Iceland
- Died: 24 May 2018 (aged 86) Ísafjörður, Iceland

Sport
- Sport: Cross-country skiing
- Club: Ármann, Skutulsfirði

Oddur Pétursson (2 July 1931 – 24 May 2018) was an Icelandic cross-country skier. He competed at the 1952 and 1956 Winter Olympics in 15–30 km events and placed 48–61.

== Personal life ==
Oddur was the brother of cross country skier Gunnar Pétursson who competed at the 1952 Winter Olympics.

== Death ==
Oddur died in Ísafjörður on 24 May 2018, at the age of 87.
