= Haukur Sigurðsson (cross-country skier) =

Icelandic cross-country skier (born 1956)

Personal information
- Nationality: Icelandic
- Born: 26 March 1956 (age 69)

Sport
- Sport: Cross-country skiing

Haukur Sigurðsson (born 26 March 1956) is an Icelandic cross-country skier. He competed in the men's 15 kilometre event at the 1980 Winter Olympics.
