= Gunnar Pétursson =

Icelandic cross-country skier (1930–2022)

Personal information
- Born: 31 March 1930 Brautarholt, Skutulsfjörður, Kingdom of Iceland
- Died: 4 May 2022 (aged 92) Ísafjörður, Iceland

Sport
- Sport: Cross-country skiing
- Club: Ármann, Skutulsfirði

Gunnar Pétursson (31 March 1930 – 4 May 2022) was an Icelandic cross-country skier who competed in the 1950s. He finished 32nd in the 18 km event at the 1952 Winter Olympics in Oslo where he was one of five skiers from Skutulsfjörður who competed at the games. He later competed several times in the Vasaloppet.

== Personal life and death ==
Gunnar was born in Brautarholt, Skutulsfjörður in the Westfjords of Iceland. He was the brother of cross-country skier Oddur Pétursson who competed at the 1952 and 1956 Winter Olympics.

Gunnar died in the nursing home Eyri in Ísafjörður, on 4 May 2022, at the age of 92.
