= Kristrún Guðnadóttir =

Icelandic cross country skier

Personal information
- Born: 13 October 1997 (age 28) Reykjavík, Iceland

Sport
- Country: Iceland
- Sport: Cross country skiing

Kristrún Guðnadóttir (born 13 October 1997) is an Icelandic cross-country skier. She represented Iceland in women's cross-country skiing at the 2022 and 2026 Winter Olympics. She also served as one of the flag-bearers for Iceland during the opening ceremony of the 2022 Winter Olympics. She also represented Iceland in three FIS Nordic World Ski Championships. She announced her retirement from the sport in April 2026 after undergoing knee surgery.

== Early and personal life ==
Kristrún Guðnadóttir was born on 13 October 1997 in Reykjavík. She is a lesbian.

== Career ==
Guðnadóttir made her debut in cross-country skiing at the Norwegian junior championship competition held at Lygna in January 2015. She continued taking part in various skiing competitions in Norway and Sweden during her initial years. In the Icelandic national skiing championships held in Akureyri in March 2017, she finished second in the sprint race. She made her debut at the FIS Nordic World Ski Championships in the 2019 edition held at Seefeld in Tirol.

Guðnadóttir qualified for the 2022 Winter Olympics held in Beijing. She served as one of Iceland's flagbearers during the opening ceremony. In the women's sprint event held on 8 February 2022, she finished 73rd out of the 91 participants in the qualifying rounds with a time of three minutes and 49.59 seconds. She competed in the cross-country skiing events at the 2023 and 2025 Nordic World Ski Championships.

Guðnadóttir took part in the 2026 Winter Olympics, which was her second and last Olympic appearance. She competed in the women's 10km freestyle and sprint events. In the qualifying round of the women's sprint event, she finished 61st amongst the 89 participants with a time of four minutes and 9.30 seconds. She was disqualified from the freestyle event, after she missed a turn in the course. After her Olympic participation, she underwent a knee surgery to treat an injury which she sustained a few weeks earlier. Following the surgery, she announced her retirement from the sport.

Over the years, she continued to perform well in the Icelandic national championships, winning 14 gold, seven silver, and two bronze medals. She had also participated in more than 150 FIS sponsored events.
