= National Olympic and Sports Association of Iceland =

National Olympic Committee

- Country: Iceland
- Code: ISL
- Created: 1912
- Recognized: 1935
- Continental Association: EOC
- Headquarters: Reykjavík, Iceland
- President: Larus L. Blöndal
- Secretary General: Liney Rut Halldorsdottir
- Website: www.isi.is

The National Olympic and Sports Association of Iceland (Icelandic: Íþrótta- og Ólympíusamband Íslands, ÍSÍ; IOC Code: ISL) is the National Olympic Committee representing Iceland, and the highest authority for sporting activity in the country. The main tasks of the ÍSÍ are to promote, coordinate and organize sporting activities in Iceland, as well as to promote the development of sport, as well as public sport events. The ÍSÍ has organized many popular public annual sporting events such as marathons and cycle to work schemes.

== History ==
ÍSÍ was founded on 28 January 1912 under the name Íþróttasamband Íslands (English: Sports Association of Iceland). In 1997 it merged with the Olympic Committee of Iceland (est. 1921) and was renamed as the National Olympic and Sports Association of Iceland.

== List of presidents ==
President	Term
Axel V. Tulinius	1912–1926
Benedikt G. Waage	1926–1962
Gísli Halldórsson	1962–1980
Sveinn Björnsson	1980–1991
Ellert Schram	1991–2006
Ólafur Rafnsson	2006–2013
Lárus L. Blöndal	2013–2025
Willum Þór Þórsson	2025–present

== Member federations ==
The Icelandic National Federations are the organizations that coordinate all aspects of their individual sports. They are responsible for training, competition and development of their sports. There are currently 21 Olympic Summer and three Winter Sport Federations and four Non-Olympic Sports Federations in Iceland.

=== Olympic Sport federations ===
National Federation	Summer or Winter	Headquarters
Icelandic Athletic Federation	Summer	Reykjavík
Icelandic Badminton Federation	Summer	Reykjavík
Icelandic Basketball Association	Summer	Reykjavík
Equestrian Association of Iceland	Summer	Reykjavík
Icelandic Fencing Federation	Summer	Reykjavík
Football Association of Iceland	Summer	Reykjavík
Golf Union of Iceland	Summer	Reykjavík
Icelandic Gymnastics Federation	Summer	Reykjavík
Icelandic Handball Association	Summer	Reykjavík
Icelandic Ice Hockey Federation	Winter	Reykjavík
Iceland Judo Federation	Summer	Reykjavík
Icelandic Karate Federation	Summer	Reykjavík
Icelandic Sailing Association	Summer	Reykjavík
Icelandic Shooting Sports Federation	Summer	Reykjavík
Icelandic Skating Association	Winter	Reykjavík
Icelandic Ski Association	Winter	Akureyri
Icelandic Swimming Association	Summer	Reykjavík
Icelandic Table Tennis Association	Summer	Reykjavík
Icelandic Taekwondo Federation	Summer	Reykjavík
Icelandic Tennis Association	Summer	Reykjavík
Icelandic Triathlon Federation	Summer	Reykjavík
Icelandic Volleyball Association	Summer	Reykjavík
Icelandic Weightlifting Federation	Summer	Reykjavík
Icelandic Wrestling Association	Summer	Reykjavík
National Paralympic Committee of Iceland	Summer/Winter	Reykjavík

=== Non-Olympic Sport federations ===
National Federation	Headquarters
Icelandic Dance Sport Federation	Reykjavík
Motorcycle and Snowmobile Sports Association of Iceland	Reykjavík
Icelandic Motorsport Association	Reykjavík
Icelandic Powerlifting Federation	Reykjavík

== See also ==
- Iceland at the Olympics
- ÍSÍ Hall of Fame
