= List of flag bearers for Chile at the Olympics =

Chile at the Olympics
- IOC code: CHI
- NOC: Chilean Olympic Committee
- Website: www.coch.cl (in Spanish)
- Medals: Gold 3 Silver 8 Bronze 4 Total 15

Summer appearances
- 1896; 1900–1908; 1912; 1920; 1924; 1928; 1932; 1936; 1948; 1952; 1956; 1960; 1964; 1968; 1972; 1976; 1980; 1984; 1988; 1992; 1996; 2000; 2004; 2008; 2012; 2016; 2020; 2024

Winter appearances
- 1948; 1952; 1956; 1960; 1964; 1968; 1972; 1976; 1980; 1984; 1988; 1992; 1994; 1998; 2002; 2006; 2010; 2014; 2018; 2022; 2026

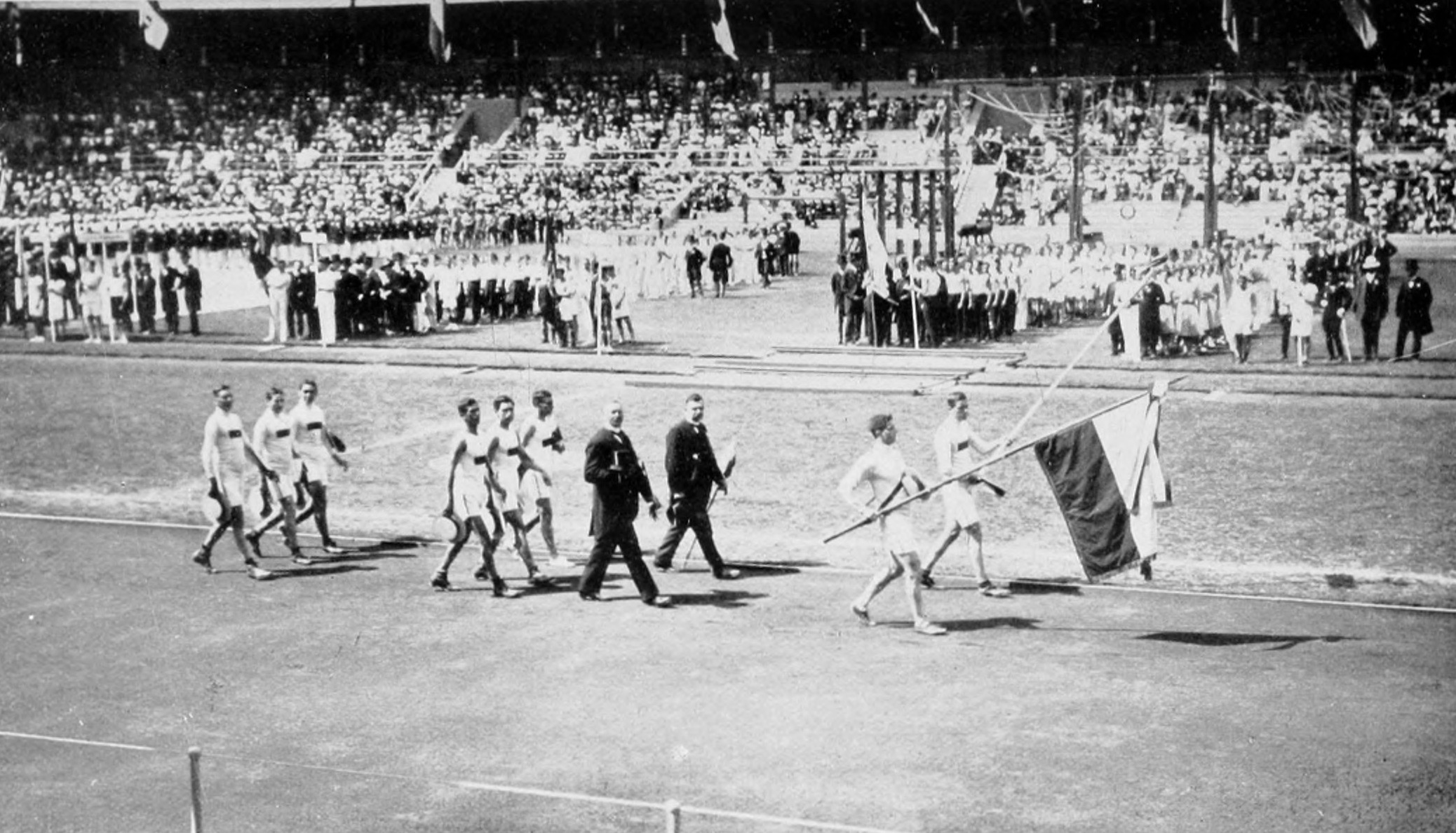
Chile at the 1912 Summer Olympics

This is a list of flag bearers who have represented Chile at the Olympics.

Flag bearers carry the national flag of their country at the opening ceremony of the Olympic Games.

#	Event year	Season	Flag bearer	Sport	Reference
1	1896	Summer	Luis Subercaseaux	Athletics	
2	1912	Summer	Leopoldo Palma	Athletics	
3	1920	Summer	Arturo Medina	Athletics	
4	1924	Summer	Manuel Plaza	Athletics	
5	1928	Summer	Manuel Plaza	Athletics	
6	1936	Summer	Rafael Zúñiga	Manager	
7	1948	Summer	Mario Recordón	Athletics	
8	1952	Summer	Adriana Millard	Athletics	
9	1956	Summer	Marlene Ahrens	Athletics	
10	1960	Winter	Vicente Vera	Alpine skiing	
11	1960	Summer	Marlene Ahrens	Athletics	
12	1964	Summer	Aquilles Gloffka	Fencing	
13	1968	Summer	Rolf Hoppe	Athletics	
14	1972	Summer	René Varas	Equestrian	
15	1976	Summer	Juan Inostroza	Fencing	
16	1984	Winter	Alfredo Maturana	Manager	
17	1984	Summer	Carlos Rossi	Sailing	
18	1988	Winter	Nils Linneberg	Alpine skiing	
19	1988	Summer	Gert Weil	Athletics	
20	1992	Winter	Paulo Oppliger	Alpine skiing	
21	1992	Summer	Gert Weil	Athletics	
22	1994	Winter	Nils Linneberg	Alpine skiing	
23	1996	Summer	Sebastián Keitel	Athletics	
24	1998	Winter	Duncan Grob	Alpine skiing	
25	2000	Summer	Nicolás Massú	Tennis	
26	2002	Winter	Anita Irarrázabal	Alpine skiing	
27	2004	Summer	Kristel Köbrich	Swimming	
28	2006	Winter	Daniela Anguita	Alpine skiing	
29	2008	Summer	Fernando González	Tennis	
30	2010	Winter	Jorge Mandrú	Alpine skiing	
31	2012	Summer	Denisse Van Lamoen	Archery	
32	2014	Winter	Dominique Ohaco	Freestyle skiing	
33	2016	Summer	Érika Olivera	Athletics	
34	2018	Winter	Henrik Von Appen	Alpine skiing	
35	2020	Summer	Francisca Crovetto	Shooting	
35	2020	Summer	Marco Grimalt	Volleyball	
36	2022	Winter	Dominique Ohaco	Freestyle skiing	
36	2022	Winter	Henrik Von Appen	Alpine skiing	
37	2024	Summer	Antonia Abraham	Rowing	
37	2024	Summer	Nicolás Jarry	Tennis	

== See also ==
- Chile at the Olympics
