= Chile at the 1988 Winter Olympics =

- IOC code: CHI
- NOC: Chilean Olympic Committee
- Website: www.coch.cl (in Spanish)

in Calgary
- Competitors: 5 (men) in 1 sport
- Flag bearer: Nils Linneberg (alpine skiing)
- Medals: Gold 0 Silver 0 Bronze 0 Total 0

Winter Olympics appearances (overview)
- 1948; 1952; 1956; 1960; 1964; 1968; 1972; 1976; 1980; 1984; 1988; 1992; 1994; 1998; 2002; 2006; 2010; 2014; 2018; 2022; 2026

Chile competed at the 1988 Winter Olympics in Calgary, Alberta, Canada.

== Competitors ==
The following is the list of number of competitors in the Games.

Sport	Men	Women	Total
Alpine skiing	5	0	5
Total	5	0	5

== Alpine skiing ==
Men

Athlete	Event	Race 1	Race 2	Total	
Athlete	Event	Time	Time	Time	Rank
Dieter Linneberg	Downhill			2:11.16	42
Nils Linneberg	Downhill			2:09.83	41
Nils Linneberg	Super-G			DNF	–
Paulo Oppliger	Super-G			1:49.71	37
Juan Pablo Santiagos	Super-G			1:48.74	33
Nils Linneberg	Giant Slalom	DNF	–	DNF	–
Paulo Oppliger	Giant Slalom	1:13.16	1:10.60	2:23.76	44
Juan Pablo Santiagos	Giant Slalom	1:12.69	1:08.78	2:21.47	40
Mauricio Rotella	Giant Slalom	1:12.40	1:10.73	2:23.13	43
Paulo Oppliger	Slalom	DSQ	–	DSQ	–
Mauricio Rotella	Slalom	DNF	–	DNF	–
Juan Pablo Santiagos	Slalom	1:00.31	55.51	1:55.82	25

Men's combined

Athlete	Downhill	Slalom		Total	
Athlete	Time	Time 1	Time 2	Points	Rank
Nils Linneberg	DNF	–	–	DNF	–
Juan Pablo Santiagos	1:58.52	49.18	47.91	224.20	23
Paulo Oppliger	1:57.65	51.54	DSQ	DSQ	–
Dieter Linneberg	1:55.97	DNF	–	DNF	–
