= Chile at the 2006 Winter Olympics =

- IOC code: CHI
- NOC: Chilean Olympic Committee
- Website: www.coch.cl (in Spanish)

in Turin
- Competitors: 9 (5 men, 4 women) in 2 sports
- Flag bearers: Daniela Anguita (opening); Marco Zúñiga (closing)
- Medals: Gold 0 Silver 0 Bronze 0 Total 0

Winter Olympics appearances (overview)
- 1948; 1952; 1956; 1960; 1964; 1968; 1972; 1976; 1980; 1984; 1988; 1992; 1994; 1998; 2002; 2006; 2010; 2014; 2018; 2022; 2026

Chile competed at the 2006 Winter Olympics in Turin, Italy.

== Alpine skiing ==
7 of Chile's 9 athletes in Turin participated in alpine skiing, including the country's top finisher, Noelle Barahona, who was 30th in the women's combined. The 15-year-old was more than 35 seconds behind the gold medal winner, and more than 20 behind the next-to-last finisher, but did complete all three runs, something 15 other competitors were unable to do.

Athlete	Event	Final				
Athlete	Event	Run 1	Run 2	Run 3	Total	Rank
Daniela Anguita	Women's super-G	did not finish				
Noelle Barahona	Women's combined	47.62	56.39	1:42.61	3:26.62	30
Macarena Benvenuto	Women's super-G	n/a			1:41.52	50
Mikael Gayme	Men's downhill	n/a			1:55.73	41
Mikael Gayme	Men's super-G	n/a			1:39.68	54
Maui Gayme	Men's downhill	n/a			1:56.10	42
Maui Gayme	Men's super-G	n/a			1:36.85	47
Duncan Grob	Men's super-G	n/a			1:36.24	44
Duncan Grob	Men's giant slalom	did not finish				
Jorge Mandrú	Men's downhill	n/a			1:58.77	49
Jorge Mandrú	Men's combined	1:45.81	52.92	disqualified		

Note: In the men's combined, run 1 is the downhill, and runs 2 and 3 are the slalom. In the women's combined, run 1 and 2 are the slalom, and run 3 the downhill.

== Biathlon ==
Zúñiga finished second-to-last in both his events, while Isbej was last in each of hers.

Athlete	Event	Final		
Athlete	Event	Time	Misses	Rank
Verónica Isbej	Women's sprint	33:52.0	4	83
Verónica Isbej	Women's individual	1:14:55.3	7	81
Marco Zúñiga	Men's sprint	33:38.1	1	89
Marco Zúñiga	Men's individual	1:11:02.5	5	87
