= Chile at the 1992 Winter Olympics =

- IOC code: CHI
- NOC: Chilean Olympic Committee
- Website: www.coch.cl (in Spanish)

in Albertville
- Competitors: 5 (men) in 1 sport
- Flag bearer: Paulo Oppliger
- Medals: Gold 0 Silver 0 Bronze 0 Total 0

Winter Olympics appearances (overview)
- 1948; 1952; 1956; 1960; 1964; 1968; 1972; 1976; 1980; 1984; 1988; 1992; 1994; 1998; 2002; 2006; 2010; 2014; 2018; 2022; 2026

Chile competed at the 1992 Winter Olympics in Albertville, France.

== Competitors ==
The following is the list of number of competitors in the Games.

Sport	Men	Women	Total
Alpine skiing	5	0	5
Total	5	0	5

== Alpine skiing ==
Men

Athlete	Event	Race 1	Race 2	Total	
Athlete	Event	Time	Time	Time	Rank
Nils Linneberg	Downhill			DNF	–
Alexis Racloz	Downhill			2:05.61	40
Paulo Oppliger	Downhill			1:56.30	35
Alexis Racloz	Super-G			1:23.26	64
Mauricio Rotella	Super-G			1:22.30	59
Paulo Oppliger	Super-G			1:16.81	32
Diego Margozzini	Giant Slalom	1:17.43	1:15.89	2:33.32	55
Alexis Racloz	Giant Slalom	1:16.50	1:12.77	2:29.27	49
Mauricio Rotella	Giant Slalom	1:15.92	1:14.52	2:30.44	51

Men's combined

Athlete	Downhill	Slalom		Total	
Athlete	Time	Time 1	Time 2	Points	Rank
Mauricio Rotella	1:54.88	DNF	–	DNF	–
Alexis Racloz	1:54.02	1:03.49	1:02.91	235.31	34
Paulo Oppliger	1:47.74	DSQ	–	DSQ	–
