= Chile at the 2002 Winter Olympics =

- IOC code: CHI
- NOC: Chilean Olympic Committee
- Website: www.coch.cl (in Spanish)

in Salt Lake City
- Competitors: 6 (4 men and 2 women) in 2 sports
- Flag bearer: Anita Irarrázabal (alpine skiing)
- Medals: Gold 0 Silver 0 Bronze 0 Total 0

Winter Olympics appearances (overview)
- 1948; 1952; 1956; 1960; 1964; 1968; 1972; 1976; 1980; 1984; 1988; 1992; 1994; 1998; 2002; 2006; 2010; 2014; 2018; 2022; 2026; 2030

Chile competed at the 2002 Winter Olympics in Salt Lake City, United States.

== Alpine skiing ==
Men

Athlete	Event	Race 1	Race 2	Total	
Athlete	Event	Time	Time	Time	Rank
Mikael Gayme	Downhill			1:48.37	50
Maui Gayme	Downhill			1:47.63	48
Maui Gayme	Super-G			DNF	–
Mikael Gayme	Super-G			DNF	–
Duncan Grob	Super-G			1:30.35	31
Maui Gayme	Giant Slalom	1:19.76	1:17.58	2:37.34	49

Women

Athlete	Event	Race	
Athlete	Event	Time	Rank
Anita Irarrázabal	Super-G	DNF	–

== Biathlon ==
Men

Event	Athlete	Misses ^{1}	Time	Rank
10 km sprint	Carlos Varas	0	32:48.1	86

Event	Athlete	Time	Misses	Adjusted time ^{3}	Rank
20 km	Carlos Varas	1'07:32.2	3	1'10:32.2	86

Women

Event	Athlete	Misses ^{1}	Time	Rank
7.5 km sprint	Claudia Barrenechea	5	30:15.1	74

Event	Athlete	Time	Misses	Adjusted time ^{3}	Rank
15 km	Claudia Barrenechea	59:30.0	3	1'02:30.0	67

^{1} A penalty loop of 150 metres had to be skied per missed target.
^{3} One minute added per missed target.
