= Chile at the 1976 Winter Olympics =

- IOC code: CHI
- NOC: Chilean Olympic Committee
- Website: www.coch.cl (in Spanish)

in Innsbruck
- Competitors: 5 (men) in 1 sport
- Medals: Gold 0 Silver 0 Bronze 0 Total 0

Winter Olympics appearances (overview)
- 1948; 1952; 1956; 1960; 1964; 1968; 1972; 1976; 1980; 1984; 1988; 1992; 1994; 1998; 2002; 2006; 2010; 2014; 2018; 2022; 2026

Chile competed at the 1976 Winter Olympics in Innsbruck, Austria after they missed in 1972.

== Alpine skiing ==
Men

| Athlete | Event | Race 1 | | Race 2 | | Total | |
| Athlete | Event | Time | Rank | Time | Rank | Time | Rank |
|---|---|---|---|---|---|---|---|
| Fernando Reutter | Downhill | | | | | 2:01.19 | 61 |
| Rafael Cañas | Downhill | | | | | 2:00.39 | 59 |
| José Luis Koifman | Downhill | | | | | 1:56.30 | 51 |
| Federico García | Giant Slalom | 2:06.99 | 75 | DNF | – | DNF | – |
| Rafael Cañas | Giant Slalom | 2:03.65 | 71 | DNF | – | DNF | – |
| José Luis Koifman | Giant Slalom | 1:58.93 | 58 | 2:02.42 | 44 | 4:01.35 | 43 |
| Roberto Koifman | Giant Slalom | 1:58.15 | 56 | 2:01.34 | 42 | 3:59.49 | 41 |
| Roberto Koifman | Slalom | DNF | – | – | – | DNF | – |
| Federico García | Slalom | DNF | – | – | – | DNF | – |
| Rafael Cañas | Slalom | DNF | – | – | – | DNF | – |
| José Luis Koifman | Slalom | 1:10.65 | 38 | 1:15.32 | 33 | 2:25.97 | 33 |
