= Chile at the 2018 Winter Olympics =

- Flag of Chile
- IOC code: CHI
- NOC: Chilean Olympic Committee
- Website: www.coch.cl (in Spanish)

in Pyeongchang, South Korea 9–25 February 2018
- Competitors: 7 in 3 sports
- Flag bearer: Henrik von Appen (opening)
- Medals: Gold 0 Silver 0 Bronze 0 Total 0

Winter Olympics appearances (overview)
- 1948; 1952; 1956; 1960; 1964; 1968; 1972; 1976; 1980; 1984; 1988; 1992; 1994; 1998; 2002; 2006; 2010; 2014; 2018; 2022; 2026

Chile competed at the 2018 Winter Olympics in Pyeongchang, South Korea, from 9 to 25 February 2018. The Chilean delegation consisted of seven athletes, five of which were returning from the 2014 Winter Olympics. The three male and four female delegation competed in three sports.

== Competitors ==
The following is the list of number of competitors participating in the Chilean delegation per sport.

Sport	Men	Women	Total
Alpine skiing	2	1	3
Cross-country skiing	1	1	2
Freestyle skiing	0	2	2
Total	3	4	7

== Alpine skiing ==
Chile qualified three athletes, one male and one female. Later it received a reallocated unused quota spot.

Athlete	Event	Run 1		Run 2		Total	
Athlete	Event	Time	Rank	Time	Rank	Time	Rank
Kai Horwitz	Men's giant slalom	1:14.88	47	DNF			
Kai Horwitz	Men's slalom	DNF					
Henrik von Appen	Men's combined	1:21.16	22	DNS		DNF	
Henrik von Appen	Men's downhill	—N/a				1:44.02	34
Henrik von Appen	Men's super-G	—N/a				1:27.57	30
Noelle Barahona	Women's combined	DNF					
Noelle Barahona	Women's downhill	—N/a				1:44.24	25
Noelle Barahona	Women's giant slalom	DNF					
Noelle Barahona	Women's super-G	—N/a				1:27.16	39

== Cross-country skiing ==
Chile qualified two athletes, one male and one female.

Distance

Athlete	Event	Final		
Athlete	Event	Time	Deficit	Rank
Yonathan Jesús Fernández	Men's 15 km freestyle	42:49.9	+9:06.0	102
Claudia Salcedo	Women's 10 km freestyle	37:19.2	+12:18.7	90

== Freestyle skiing ==
Chile qualified one female athlete in slopestyle, and received a reallocation spot in women's ski cross.

Ski cross

Athlete	Event	Seeding		Round of 16	Quarterfinal	Semifinal	Final	
Athlete	Event	Time	Rank	Position	Position	Position	Position	Rank
Stephanie Joffroy	Women's ski cross	1:16.70	18	3	Did Not Advance			

Slopestyle

Athlete	Event	Qualification				Final				
Athlete	Event	Run 1	Run 2	Best	Rank	Run 1	Run 2	Run 3	Best	Rank
Dominique Ohaco	Women's slopestyle	16.00	38.60	38.60	20	did not advance				

== See also ==
- Chile at the 2018 Summer Youth Olympics
