= Chile at the 1998 Winter Olympics =

- IOC code: CHI
- NOC: Chilean Olympic Committee
- Website: www.coch.cl (in Spanish)

in Nagano
- Competitors: 3 (men) in 1 sport
- Flag bearer: Duncan Grob
- Medals: Gold 0 Silver 0 Bronze 0 Total 0

Winter Olympics appearances (overview)
- 1948; 1952; 1956; 1960; 1964; 1968; 1972; 1976; 1980; 1984; 1988; 1992; 1994; 1998; 2002; 2006; 2010; 2014; 2018; 2022; 2026

Chile was represented at the 1998 Winter Olympics in Nagano, Japan by the Chilean Olympic Committee.

In total, three athletes – all men – represented Chile in one sport: alpine skiing.

== Competitors ==
In total, three athletes represented Chile at the 1998 Winter Olympics in Nagano, Japan in one sport.

| Sport | Men | Women | Total |
|---|---|---|---|
| Alpine skiing | 3 | 0 | 3 |
| Total | 3 | 0 | 3 |

== Alpine skiing ==
In total, three Chilean athletes participated in the alpine skiing events – Rainer Grob, Thomás Grob and Nils Linneberg.

The alpine skiing events took place from 10 to 21 February 1998. The speed events were held at the Hakuba Happoone Winter Resort in Hakuba, Nagano Prefecture and the technical events were held at Shiga Kogen in Yamanouchi, Nagano Prefecture.

The men's downhill was due to take place on 8 February 1998 but was postponed three times due to the weather and instead took place on 13 February 1998. Linneberg completed the course in a time of one minute 56.59 seconds to finish 26th overall. Rainer Grob completed the course in a time of one minute 58.75 seconds to finish 28th overall. Thomás Grob did not finish.

The men's super-G took place on 16 February 1998. Thomás Grob did not finish.

| Athlete | Event | Race 1 | Race 2 | Total | |
| Athlete | Event | Time | Time | Time | Rank |
|---|---|---|---|---|---|
| Thomás Grob | Downhill | | | DNF | – |
| Rainer Grob | Downhill | | | 1:58.75 | 28 |
| Nils Linneberg | Downhill | | | 1:56.59 | 26 |
| Thomás Grob | Super-G | | | DNF | – |

The men's combined took place on 10 and 13 February 1998. Rainer Grob completed his first slalom run in a time of 58.50 seconds and his second slalom run in a time of 54.63 seconds. He completed his downhill run in a time of one minute 41.36 seconds for a total time of three minutes 34.49 seconds to finish 13th overall. Thomás Grob completed his first slalom run in a time of 56.51 seconds and his second slalom run in a time of 51.41 seconds. He completed his downhill run in a time of one minute 40.68 seconds for a total time of three minutes 28.6 seconds to finish 11th overall.

| Athlete | Event | Slalom | | Downhill | Total | |
| Athlete | Event | Time 1 | Time 2 | Time | Total time | Rank |
|---|---|---|---|---|---|---|
| Rainer Grob | Combined | 58.50 | 54.63 | 1:41.26 | 3:34.49 | 13 |
| Thomás Grob | Combined | 56.51 | 51.41 | 1:40.68 | 3:28.60 | 11 |
