= Chile at the Olympics =

- IOC code: CHI
- NOC: Chilean Olympic Committee
- Website: www.coch.cl (in Spanish)
- Medals Ranked 81st: Gold 3 Silver 8 Bronze 4 Total 15

Summer appearances
- ~~1896~~; 1900–1908; 1912; 1920; 1924; 1928; 1932; 1936; 1948; 1952; 1956; 1960; 1964; 1968; 1972; 1976; 1980; 1984; 1988; 1992; 1996; 2000; 2004; 2008; 2012; 2016; 2020; 2024; 2028

Winter appearances
- 1948; 1952; 1956; 1960; 1964; 1968; 1972; 1976; 1980; 1984; 1988; 1992; 1994; 1998; 2002; 2006; 2010; 2014; 2018; 2022; 2026

Chile lays claim to being one of 14 nations to participate at the inaugural 1896 Summer Olympics and made its debut appearance at the 1948 Winter Olympics. The national teams sent by Chile to each of the Olympic Games have been under the auspices of the Chilean Olympic Committee since its inception in 1934 and acceptance by the International Olympic Committee. Previous to the establishment of the Chilean Olympic Committee, athletes were sent to the Olympics under the auspices of the Chilean Athletics Federation.

The athletes representing Chile at the Olympics have brought home a total of fifteen medals, with tennis as the top medal-producing sport. Chile has yet to win any medals at the Winter Olympic Games.

== Medal tables ==
=== Medals by Summer Games ===
Games	Athletes	Gold	Silver	Bronze	Total	Rank
(Belgium) 1920 Antwerp	1	0	0	1	1	–
(French Third Republic) 1900 Paris	did not participate					
(United States) 1904 St. Louis	did not participate					
(United Kingdom) 1908 London	did not participate					
(Sweden) 1912 Stockholm	14	0	0	0	0	–
(Belgium) 1920 Antwerp	2	0	0	0	0	–
(French Third Republic) 1924 Paris	13	0	0	0	0	–
(Netherlands) 1928 Amsterdam	38	0	1	0	1	30
(United States) 1932 Los Angeles	did not participate					
(Nazi Germany) 1936 Berlin	40	0	0	0	0	–
(United Kingdom) 1948 London	54	0	0	0	0	–
(Finland) 1952 Helsinki	59	0	2	0	2	31
(Australia) 1956 Melbourne	33	0	2	2	4	27
(Italy) 1960 Rome	9	0	0	0	0	–
(Japan) 1964 Tokyo	14	0	0	0	0	–
1968 Mexico City	21	0	0	0	0	–
(West Germany) 1972 Munich	11	0	0	0	0	–
(Canada) 1976 Montreal	7	0	0	0	0	–
(Soviet Union) 1980 Moscow	boycotted					
(United States) 1984 Los Angeles	52	0	0	0	0	–
(South Korea) 1988 Seoul	17	0	1	0	1	36
(Spain) 1992 Barcelona	12	0	0	0	0	–
(United States) 1996 Atlanta	21	0	0	0	0	–
(Australia) 2000 Sydney	50	0	0	1	1	71
(Greece) 2004 Athens	22	2	0	1	3	39
(China) 2008 Beijing	27	0	1	0	1	70
(United Kingdom) 2012 London	35	0	0	0	0	–
(Brazil) 2016 Rio de Janeiro	42	0	0	0	0	–
(Japan) 2020 Tokyo	58	0	0	0	0	–
(France) 2024 Paris	48	1	1	0	2	55
(United States) 2028 Los Angeles	future event					
(Australia) 2032 Brisbane	future event					
Total (25/30)	700	3	8	5	16	80

=== Medals by Winter Games ===
Games	Athletes	Gold	Silver	Bronze	Total	Rank
(Switzerland) 1948 St. Moritz	4	0	0	0	0	–
(Norway) 1952 Oslo	3	0	0	0	0	–
(Italy) 1956 Cortina d'Ampezzo	4	0	0	0	0	–
(United States) 1960 Squaw Valley	5	0	0	0	0	–
(Austria) 1964 Innsbruck	5	0	0	0	0	–
(France) 1968 Grenoble	4	0	0	0	0	–
(Japan) 1972 Sapporo	did not participate					
(Austria) 1976 Innsbruck	5	0	0	0	0	–
(United States) 1980 Lake Placid	did not participate					
(Socialist Federal Republic of Yugoslavia) 1984 Sarajevo	4	0	0	0	0	–
(Canada) 1988 Calgary	5	0	0	0	0	–
(France) 1992 Albertville	5	0	0	0	0	–
(Norway) 1994 Lillehammer	3	0	1	0	1	15
(Japan) 1998 Nagano	3	0	0	0	0	–
(United States) 2002 Salt Lake City	6	0	0	0	0	–
(Italy) 2006 Turin	9	0	0	0	0	–
(Canada) 2010 Vancouver	3	0	0	0	0	–
(Russia) 2014 Sochi	6	0	0	0	0	–
(South Korea) 2018 Pyeongchang	7	0	0	0	0	–
(China) 2022 Beijing	4	0	0	0	0	–
(Italy) 2026 Milano Cortina	4	0	0	0	0	–
(France) 2030 French Alps	future event					
(United States) 2034 Utah	future event					
Total (19/25)	89	0	1	0	1	–

=== Medals by summer sport ===
Sport	Gold	Silver	Bronze	Total
Tennis	2	1	1	4
Shooting	1	1	0	2
Athletics	0	2	0	2
Equestrian	0	2	0	2
Boxing	0	1	2	3
Wrestling	0	1	0	1
Football	0	0	1	1
Totals (7 entries)	3	8	4	15

=== Medals by gender ===
Gender	Gold	Silver	Bronze	Total
Men	2	7	4	13
Women	1	1	0	2
Mixed	0	0	0	0
Total	3	8	4	15

== List of medalists ==
A total of 32 athletes have won 15 Olympic medals for Chile. Only three athletes have won more than one medal: Óscar Cristi (two silver), Fernando González (one gold, one silver and one bronze) and Nicolás Massú (two gold).

Medal	Name	Games	Sport	Event
Silver	Manuel Plaza	(Netherlands) 1928 Amsterdam	Athletics	Men's marathon
Silver	Óscar Cristi	(Finland) 1952 Helsinki	Equestrian	Individual jumping
Silver	Óscar Cristi; Ricardo Echeverría; César Mendoza	(Finland) 1952 Helsinki	Equestrian	Team jumping
Silver	Marlene Ahrens	(Australia) 1956 Melbourne	Athletics	Women's javelin throw
Bronze	Claudio Barrientos	(Australia) 1956 Melbourne	Boxing	Men's bantamweight
Silver	Ramón Tapia	(Australia) 1956 Melbourne	Boxing	Men's middleweight
Bronze	Carlos Lucas	(Australia) 1956 Melbourne	Boxing	Men's light heavyweight
Silver	Alfonso de Iruarrizaga	(South Korea) 1988 Seoul	Shooting	Mixed skeet
Bronze	National U-23 football team: Pedro Reyes Nelson Tapia Héctor Tapia Iván Zamorano Javier di Gregorio Cristián Álvarez Francisco Arrué Pablo Contreras Sebastián González David Henríquez Manuel Ibarra Claudio Maldonado Reinaldo Navia Rodrigo Núñez Rafael Olarra Patricio Ormazábal David Pizarro Rodrigo Tello Mauricio Rojas	(Australia) 2000 Sydney	Football	Men's competition
Gold	Fernando González; Nicolás Massú	(Greece) 2004 Athens	Tennis	Men's doubles
Gold	Nicolás Massú	(Greece) 2004 Athens	Tennis	Men's singles
Bronze	Fernando González	(Greece) 2004 Athens	Tennis	Men's singles
Silver	Fernando González	(China) 2008 Beijing	Tennis	Men's singles
Gold	Francisca Crovetto	(France) 2024 Paris	Shooting	Women's skeet
Silver	Yasmani Acosta	(France) 2024 Paris	Wrestling	Men's Greco-Roman 130 kg

Best non-medaling results:

Sport	Rank	Athlete	Event & Year
Summer
Sailing	4th	Erich Wichmann-Harbeck	O-Jolle in 1936
Gymnastics	4th	Tomás González	Men's floor in 2012
Gymnastics	4th	Tomás González	Men's vault in 2012
Golf	4th	Guillermo Pereira	Men's individual in 2020
Cycling	5th	Mario Masanés	Men's sprint in 1948
Cycling	5th	Macarena Perez Grasset	Women's BMX freestyle in 2024
Basketball	5th	Chile men's team	Men's tournament in 1952
Triathlon	5th	Bárbara Riveros	Women's individual in 2016
Weightlifting	6th	María Valdés	Women's 75 kg in 2012
Modern pentathlon	7th	Nilo Floody; Hernán Fuentes; Luis Carmona	Men's team in 1952
Diving	7th	Günther Mund	Men's 3 metre springboard in 1956
Rowing	7th	Rodrigo Abásolo; Mario Castro; Víctor Contreras; Zibor Llanos; Carlos Neyra; Rodolfo Pereira; Alejandro Rojas; Marcelo Rojas; Giorgio Vallebuona	Men's eight in 1984
Taekwondo	7th	Felipe Soto	Men's 80 kg in 2000
Fencing	9th	Jorge Garretón; Abelardo Castro; Tomas Goyoaga; Oscar Novoa; Efraín Díaz; Nemoroso Riquelme	Men's team sabre in 1928
Archery	9th	Ricardo Soto	Men's individual in 2016
Canoeing	9th	María Mailliard; Karen Roco	Women's C-2 500 metres in 2020
Judo	9th	Mary Dee Vargas	Women's 48 kg in 2020
Beach volleyball	9th	Marco Grimalt; Esteban Grimalt	Men's tournament in 2020
Beach volleyball	9th	Marco Grimalt; Esteban Grimalt	Men's tournament in 2024
Water polo	13th	Osvaldo Martinez; Augusto Hurtado; Teodoro Salah; Luis Aguirrebeña; Isaac Froimovich; Pedro Aguirrebeña; José Salah; Svante Törnvall	Men's tournament 1948
Swimming	14th	Kristel Kobrich	Women's 800 m in 2012
Swimming	14th	Kristel Kobrich	Women's 1500 m in 2020
Surfing	17th	Manuel Selman	Men's shortboard in 2020
Skateboarding	19th	Josefina Tapia	Women's park in 2020
Winter
Alpine skiing	11th	Thomás Grob	Men's combined in 1998
Biathlon	67th	Claudia Barrenechea	Women's individual in 2002
Cross-country skiing	84th	Yonathan Fernández	Men's sprint in 2014
Freestyle skiing	13th	Dominique Ohaco	Women's slopestyle in 2014

== See also ==
- List of flag bearers for Chile at the Olympics
- Category:Olympic competitors for Chile
- Chile at the Paralympics
