= Chile at the 1994 Winter Olympics =

- IOC code: CHI
- NOC: Chilean Olympic Committee
- Website: www.coch.cl (in Spanish)

in Lillehammer
- Competitors: 3 (3 men) in 1 sport
- Flag bearer: Nils Linneberg
- Medals: Gold 0 Silver 0 Bronze 0 Total 0

Winter Olympics appearances (overview)
- 1948; 1952; 1956; 1960; 1964; 1968; 1972; 1976; 1980; 1984; 1988; 1992; 1994; 1998; 2002; 2006; 2010; 2014; 2018; 2022; 2026

Chile competed at the 1994 Winter Olympics in Lillehammer, Norway.

== Competitors ==
The following is the list of number of competitors in the Games.

Sport	Men	Women	Total
Alpine skiing	3	0	3
Total	3	0	3

== Alpine skiing ==
Men

Athlete	Event	Final				
Athlete	Event	Run 1	Run 2	Run 3	Total	Rank
Nils Linneberg	Downhill				1:49.80	42
Nils Linneberg	Super-G				DNF	
Nils Linneberg	Combined	1:40.84	1:00.36	DSQ	DSQ	
Diego Margozzini	Downhill				1:55.32	49
Diego Margozzini	Combined	1:45.07	59.68	57.64	3:42.39	32
Alexis Racloz	Super-G				1:41.12	47
Alexis Racloz	Combined	1:45.67	DNF		DNF	
