= Grob (surname) =

Grob is a surname of German origin, derived from the Middle High German word grob, meaning "coarse," "rough," or "uncouth.". Notable people with the name include:

- Charles Grob, American psychiatrist
- Connie Grob (1932–1997), American baseball player
- Duncan Grob (born 1980), Chilean alpine skier
- Gary Grob, American baseball coach
- Gerald N. Grob (1931–2015), American mental health historian
- Gertrude Grob-Prandl (1917–1995), Austrian opera singer
- Henri Grob (1904–1974), Swiss chess player
- Ian Grob (born 1952), English racing driver
- Jakob Grob (born 1939), Swiss rower
- Jeffrey S. Grob (born 1961), American Catholic priest
- Johannes Grob (1643–1697), Swiss merchant, diplomat, and poet
- Karl Grob (1946–2019), Swiss footballer
- Konrad Grob (1828–1904), Swiss painter
- Mike Grob (born 1964), American golfer
- Rainer Grob (born 1973), Chilean alpine skier
- Stefanie Grob (born 2004), Swiss alpine skier
- Therese Grob (1798–1875), Austrian singer
- Thomás Grob (born 1977), Chilean alpine skier
