= Chile at the 1952 Winter Olympics =

- IOC code: CHI
- NOC: Chilean Olympic Committee
- Website: www.coch.cl (in Spanish)

in Oslo
- Competitors: 3 (men) in 1 sport
- Medals: Gold 0 Silver 0 Bronze 0 Total 0

Winter Olympics appearances (overview)
- 1948; 1952; 1956; 1960; 1964; 1968; 1972; 1976; 1980; 1984; 1988; 1992; 1994; 1998; 2002; 2006; 2010; 2014; 2018; 2022; 2026

Chile competed at the 1952 Winter Olympics in Oslo, Norway.

== Alpine skiing ==
Men

Athlete	Event	Race 1		Race 2		Total	
Athlete	Event	Time	Rank	Time	Rank	Time	Rank
Jaime Errázuriz	Downhill					3:53.3	68
Eduardo Silva	Downhill					3:52.3	66
Jaime Errázuriz	Giant Slalom					3:30.3	76
Eduardo Silva	Giant Slalom					3:25.6	75
Sergio Navarrete	Slalom	1:20.9	63	did not advance			
Jaime Errázuriz	Slalom	1:19.0	62	did not advance			
Eduardo Silva	Slalom	1:16.2	56	did not advance			
