= Chile at the 2022 Winter Olympics =

- Flag of Chile
- IOC code: CHI
- NOC: Chilean Olympic Committee
- Website: www.coch.cl (in Spanish)

in Beijing, China 4–20 February 2022
- Competitors: 4 (2 men and 2 women) in 3 sports
- Flag bearers (opening): Dominique Ohaco; Henrik von Appen
- Flag bearer (closing): Volunteer
- Medals: Gold 0 Silver 0 Bronze 0 Total 0

Winter Olympics appearances (overview)
- 1948; 1952; 1956; 1960; 1964; 1968; 1972; 1976; 1980; 1984; 1988; 1992; 1994; 1998; 2002; 2006; 2010; 2014; 2018; 2022; 2026

Chile competed at the 2022 Winter Olympics in Beijing, China, from 4 to 20 February 2022.

The Chilean team consisted of four athletes (two men and two women) competing in three sports. Dominique Ohaco and Henrik von Appen were the country's flagbearer during the opening ceremony. A volunteer served as the flagbearer during the closing ceremony.

== Competitors ==
The following is the list of number of competitors who participated at the Games per sport/discipline.

Sport	Men	Women	Total
Alpine skiing	1	1	2
Cross-country skiing	1	0	1
Freestyle skiing	0	1	1
Total	2	2	4

== Alpine skiing ==
By meeting the basic qualification standards Chile qualified one male and one female alpine skier.

Athlete	Event	Run 1		Run 2		Total	
Athlete	Event	Time	Rank	Time	Rank	Time	Rank
Henrik von Appen	Men's combined	1:46.51	18	DNF			
Henrik von Appen	Men's downhill	—N/a				1:47.69	32
Henrik von Appen	Men's super-G	—N/a				1:23.55	27
Emilia Aramburo	Women's giant slalom	1:07.71	49	1:08.61	44	2:16.32	42
Emilia Aramburo	Women's slalom	DNF		Did not advance			

== Cross-country skiing ==
By meeting the basic qualification standards Chile qualified one male cross-country skier.

Distance

Athlete	Event	Final		
Athlete	Event	Time	Deficit	Rank
Yonathan Jesús Fernández	Men's 15 km classical	50:36.6	+12:41.8	91

== Freestyle skiing ==
Freeski

Athlete	Event	Qualification					Final				
Athlete	Event	Run 1	Run 2	Run 3	Total	Rank	Run 1	Run 2	Run 3	Best	Rank
Dominique Ohaco	Women's big air	60.25	~~11.25~~	66.25	126.50	16	Did not advance				
Dominique Ohaco	Women's slopestyle	~~17.28~~	44.85	—N/a	44.85	22	Did not advance				

== See also ==
- Chile at the 2022 Winter Paralympics
