= Alpine skiing at the 1998 Winter Olympics – Men's downhill =

Winter Olympics competition

Men's downhill at the XVIII Olympic Winter Games
- Alpine skiing
- Venue: Hakuba
- Date: February 13, 1998
- Competitors: 43 from 18 nations
- Winning time: 1:50.11

Medalists
1st place, gold medalist(s)		Jean-Luc Crétier	France
2nd place, silver medalist(s)		Lasse Kjus	Norway
3rd place, bronze medalist(s)		Hannes Trinkl	Austria

Men's Downhill
- Location: Hakuba – Happo-One; Olympic Course I
- Vertical: 925 m (3,035 ft)
- Top elevation: 1,765 m (5,791 ft)
- Base elevation: 840 m (2,756 ft)

The Men's Downhill competition of the Nagano 1998 Olympics was held at Hakuba on Friday, February 13. Originally scheduled for Sunday, the race was postponed several times due to heavy snow, followed by rain and gusty winds.

The reigning world champion was Bruno Kernen of Switzerland, while France's Luc Alphand was the reigning World Cup downhill champion, but had since retired from competition. The defending Olympic champion was Tommy Moe of the United States.

France's Jean-Luc Crétier won the gold medal, Lasse Kjus of Norway took the silver, and the bronze medalist was Hannes Trinkl of Austria; Moe was twelfth and Kernan did not finish. Nine of the first twenty failed to finish, including a crash by favorite Hermann Maier of Austria, which he walked away from. Luca Cattaneo's injury caused a half-hour delay underneath the clear skies, as the temperature at the finish approached 15 °C (59 °F). Of the eight with bib numbers 13 through 20, only Moe completed the race; in total, fifteen of the 43 racers did not finish.

It was the sole victory of Crétier's career; he had five World cup podiums, three of which were in the two months preceding the Olympics, at the notable venues of Beaver Creek, Wengen, and Kitzbühel. Entering the Olympics, he was fourth in the season's World Cup downhill standings.

The course started at an elevation of 1,765 m (5,791 ft) above sea level with a vertical drop of 925 m (3,035 ft) and a course length of 3.289 km (2.04 mi). Crétier's winning time was 110.11 seconds, yielding an average course speed of 107.532 km/h (66.8 mph), with an average vertical descent rate of 8.401 m/s (27.6 ft/s).

== Results ==
The race was started at 11:00 local time, (UTC +9). At the starting gate, the skies were clear, the temperature was 2.3 °C (36 °F), and the snow condition was hard; the temperature at the finish at 12.3 °C (54 °F).

Rank	Bib	Name	Country	Time	Behind
1st place, gold medalist(s)	3	Jean-Luc Crétier	France	1:50.11	—
2nd place, silver medalist(s)	10	Lasse Kjus	Norway	1:50.51	+0.40
3rd place, bronze medalist(s)	8	Hannes Trinkl	Austria	1:50.63	+0.52
4	24	Jürg Grünenfelder	Switzerland	1:50.64	+0.53
5	25	Ed Podivinsky	Canada	1:50.71	+0.60
6	7	Kristian Ghedina	Italy	1:50.76	+0.65
7	5	Andreas Schifferer	Austria	1:50.77	+0.66
8	9	Didier Cuche	Switzerland	1:50.91	+0.80
9	26	Kyle Rasmussen	United States	1:51.09	+0.98
10	23	Patrik Järbyn	Sweden	1:51.22	+1.11
11	2	Fritz Strobl	Austria	1:51.34	+1.23
12	17	Tommy Moe	United States	1:51.43	+1.32
13	11	Kjetil André Aamodt	Norway	1:51.72	+1.61
14	1	Franco Cavegn	Switzerland	1:51.74	+1.63
15	30	Jason Rosener	United States	1:52.33	+2.22
16	12	Werner Perathoner	Italy	1:52.36	+2.25
17	21	Tsuyoshi Tomii	Japan	1:52.62	+2.51
18	33	Andrey Filichkin	Russia	1:52.65	+2.54
19	22	Kevin Wert	Canada	1:52.67	+2.56
20	31	Jernej Koblar	Slovenia	1:52.79	+2.68
21	36	Enis Bećirbegović	Bosnia and Herzegovina	1:53.47	+3.36
22	43	Andrzej Bachleda-Curuś	Poland	1:53.62	+3.51
23	35	Graham Bell	Great Britain	1:53.93	+3.82
24	38	Vasily Bezsmelnitsyn	Russia	1:54.27	+4.16
25	37	Linas Vaitkus	Lithuania	1:56.22	+6.11
26	39	Nils Linneberg	Chile	1:56.59	+6.48
27	42	Patrick-Paul Schwarzacher-Joyce	Ireland	1:58.71	+8.60
28	41	Rainer Grob	Chile	1:58.75	+8.64
	4	Hermann Maier	Austria	DNF	
	6	Nicolas Burtin	France	DNF	
	13	Bruno Kernen	Switzerland	DNF	
	14	Luca Cattaneo	Italy	DNF	
	15	Peter Runggaldier	Italy	DNF	
	16	Luke Sauder	Canada	DNF	
	18	Aleš Brezavšček	Slovenia	DNF	
	19	A J Kitt	United States	DNF	
	20	Brian Stemmle	Canada	DNF	
	27	Adrien Duvillard	France	DNF	
	28	Peter Pen	Slovenia	DNF	
	29	Jürgen Hasler	Liechtenstein	DNF	
	32	Andrew Freshwater	Great Britain	DNF	
	34	Yasuyuki Takishita	Japan	DNF	
	40	Thomás Grob	Chile	DNF	
