= Chile at the 1948 Winter Olympics =

- IOC code: CHI
- NOC: Chilean Olympic Committee
- Website: www.coch.cl (in Spanish)

in St. Moritz
- Competitors: 4 (men) in 1 sport
- Medals: Gold 0 Silver 0 Bronze 0 Total 0

Winter Olympics appearances (overview)
- 1948; 1952; 1956; 1960; 1964; 1968; 1972; 1976; 1980; 1984; 1988; 1992; 1994; 1998; 2002; 2006; 2010; 2014; 2018; 2022; 2026

Chile competed at the Winter Olympic Games for the first time at the 1948 Winter Olympics in St. Moritz, Switzerland.

== Alpine skiing ==
Men

| Athlete | Event | Race 1 | | Race 2 | | Total | |
| Athlete | Event | Time | Rank | Time | Rank | Time | Rank |
|---|---|---|---|---|---|---|---|
| Gonzalo Domínguez | Downhill | | | | | 4:08.3 | 83 |
| Jaime Errázuriz | Downhill | | | | | 3:56.4 | 78 |
| Arturo Hammersley | Downhill | | | | | 3:54.1 | 74 |
| Hernán Oelckers | Downhill | | | | | 3:40.2 | 59 |
| Jaime Errázuriz | Slalom | DNF | – | – | – | DNF | – |
| Arturo Hammersley | Slalom | 1:49.2 | 54 | 1:26.9 | 52 | 3:16.1 | 54 |
| Hernán Oelckers | Slalom | 1:44.2 | 52 | 1:24.8 | 50 | 3:09.0 | 52 |

Men's combined

The downhill part of this event was held along with the main medal event of downhill skiing. For athletes competing in both events, the same time was used (see table above for the results). The slalom part of the event was held separate from the main medal event of slalom skiing (included in table below).

| Athlete | Slalom | | | Total (downhill + slalom) | |
| Athlete | Time 1 | Time 2 | Rank | Points | Rank |
|---|---|---|---|---|---|
| Gonzalo Domínguez | – | – | – | DNF | – |
| Arturo Hammersley | 2:02.5 (+0:05) | 1:35.5 (+0:05) | 63 | 69.32 | 57 |
| Jaime Errázuriz | 1:41.1 | 1:34.6 | 57 | 60.91 | 52 |
| Hernán Oelckers | 1:33.6 | 1:21.6 | 39 | 42.83 | 38 |
