= 2022 FIS Alpine Ski South American Cup =

Discipline	Men	Women
Overall	(Argentina) Tiziano Gravier	(Albania) Lara Colturi
Downhill	(Chile) Henrik Von Appen	(Norway) Malin Sofie Sund
Super-G	(Chile) Henrik Von Appen	(United States) Tricia Mangan
Giant slalom	(Chile) Nicolas Pirozzi	(Albania) Lara Colturi
Slalom	(Chile) Andrés Figueroa	(Albania) Lara Colturi
Alpine Combined	(Argentina) Tiziano Gravier	(Albania) Lara Colturi (Norway) Malin Sofie Sund

Competition
Locations	6 venues	6 venues
Individual	19 events	19 events
Cancelled	1	1

The 2022 FIS Alpine Ski South American Cup was the South American Cup season, the second international level competition in alpine skiing.

== Men ==
=== Calendar ===
Stage	Date	Place	Discipline	Winner	Second	Third	Details
1	5 August 2022	(Argentina) Chapelco	Giant slalom	(Chile) Nicolas Pirozzi	(Argentina) Tiziano Gravier	(Argentina) Tomas Birkner de Miguel	
2	9 August 2022	(Argentina) Cerro Catedral	Giant slalom	(Chile) Andrés Figueroa	(Argentina) Tomas Birkner de Miguel	(Argentina) Delfin van Ditmar	
3	10 August 2022	(Argentina) Cerro Catedral	Slalom	(Chile) Andrés Figueroa	(Argentina) Delfin van Ditmar	(Argentina) Cristian Simari Birkner	
4	11 August 2022	(Argentina) Cerro Catedral	Slalom	(Chile) Andrés Figueroa	(Argentina) Cristian Simari Birkner	(United States) Oliver Parazette	
5	27 August 2022	(Chile) El Colorado	Giant slalom	(Argentina) Delfin van Ditmar	(Chile) Andrés Figueroa	(Chile) Nicolas Pirozzi	
6	28 August 2022	(Chile) La Parva	Slalom	(Japan) Akira Sasaki	(Argentina) Cristian Simari Birkner	(Chile) Andrés Figueroa	
7	30 August 2022	(Chile) La Parva	Downhill	(Slovenia) Miha Hrobat	(Germany) Jacob Schramm	(Chile) Henrik Von Appen	
8	30 August 2022	(Chile) La Parva	Downhill	(Germany) Jacob Schramm	(Chile) Henrik Von Appen	(Slovenia) Miha Hrobat	
9	31 August 2022	(Chile) La Parva	Super-G	(France) Johan Clarey	(Slovenia) Martin Cater	(France) Cyprien Sarrazin	
10	31 August 2022	(Chile) La Parva	Super-G	(France) Cyprien Sarrazin	(France) Matthieu Bailet	(France) Johan Clarey	
11	1 September 2022	(Chile) La Parva	Alpine Combined	(Chile) Henrik Von Appen	(Argentina) Tiziano Gravier	(United Kingdom) Samuel Todd-Saunders	
12	12 September 2022	(Argentina) Cerro Castor	Giant slalom	(Italy) Giovanni Borsotti	(Italy) Filippo Della Vite	(Italy) Simon Maurberger	
13	13 September 2022	(Argentina) Cerro Castor	Giant slalom	(Italy) Alex Vinatzer	(Italy) Tobias Kastlunger	(Italy) Manuel Ploner	
14	14 September 2022	(Argentina) Cerro Castor	Slalom	(Spain) Juan del Campo	(Andorra) Axel Esteve	(Italy) Tobias Kastlunger	
15	15 September 2022	(Argentina) Cerro Castor	Slalom	(Spain) Joaquim Salarich	(France) Thibaut Favrot	(Spain) Juan del Campo	
16	27 September 2022	(Chile) Corralco	Downhill	(Chile) Henrik Von Appen	(Austria) Stefan Eichberger	(Austria) Andreas Ploier	
17	28 September 2022	(Chile) Corralco	Downhill	(Chile) Henrik Von Appen	(Austria) Andreas Ploier	(Austria) Manuel Traninger	
	28 September 2022	(Chile) Corralco	Alpine Combined	cancelled			
18	29 September 2022	(Chile) Corralco	Super-G	(Chile) Henrik Von Appen	(Chile) Sven Von Appen	(United Kingdom) Roy-Alexander Steudle	
19	29 September 2022	(Chile) Corralco	Alpine Combined	(Argentina) Tiziano Gravier	(United States) Laiken Roth	(Chile) Henrik Von Appen	

=== Rankings ===
==== Overall ====
Rank	after 25 of 25 races	Points
1	(Argentina) Tiziano Gravier	721
2	(Chile) Henrik Von Appen	715
3	(Chile) Andrés Figueroa	626
4	(Argentina) Delfin van Ditmar	398
5	(Argentina) Cristian Simari Birkner	369

==== Downhill ====
Rank	after 5 of 5 races	Points
1	(Chile) Henrik Von Appen	360
2	(Germany) Jacob Schramm	180
3	(Slovenia) Miha Hrobat	160
4	(Argentina) Tiziano Gravier	150
5	(United Kingdom) Roy-Alexander Steudle	149

==== Super-G ====
Rank	after 3 of 3 races	Points
1	(Chile) Henrik Von Appen	195
2	(France) Johan Clarey	160
2	(France) Cyprien Sarrazin	160
4	(France) Matthieu Bailet	116
4	(Slovenia) Martin Cater	116

==== Giant slalom ====
Rank	after 8 of 8 races	Points
1	(Chile) Nicolas Pirozzi	213
2	(Argentina) Delfin van Ditmar	212
3	(Chile) Andrés Figueroa	205
4	(Argentina) Tiziano Gravier	179
5	(Argentina) Tomas Birkner de Miguel	140

==== Slalom ====
Rank	after 7 of 7 races	Points
1	(Chile) Andrés Figueroa	271
2	(Argentina) Cristian Simari Birkner	257
3	(Argentina) Delfin van Ditmar	162
4	(Spain) Juan del Campo	160
5	(Argentina) Tiziano Gravier	145

==== Alpine combined ====
Rank	after 2 of 2 races	Points
1	(Argentina) Tiziano Gravier	180
2	(Chile) Henrik Von Appen	160
3	(Argentina) Bautista Alarcón	90
4	(United States) Laiken Roth	80
5	(Chile) Andrés Figueroa	76

== Women ==
=== Calendar ===
Stage	Date	Place	Discipline	Winner	Second	Third	Details
1	5 August 2022	(Argentina) Chapelco	Giant slalom	(Albania) Lara Colturi	(Argentina) Francesca Baruzzi	(Mexico) Sarah Schleper	
2	9 August 2022	(Argentina) Cerro Catedral	Giant slalom	(Albania) Lara Colturi	(Mexico) Sarah Schleper	(Argentina) Francesca Baruzzi	
3	10 August 2022	(Argentina) Cerro Catedral	Slalom	(Argentina) Francesca Baruzzi	(United Kingdom) Giselle Gorringe	(Argentina) Maria Sibari	
4	11 August 2022	(Argentina) Cerro Catedral	Slalom	(Albania) Lara Colturi	(Canada) Marie-Penelope Robinson	(United Kingdom) Giselle Gorringe	
5	27 August 2022	(Chile) El Colorado	Giant slalom	(Albania) Lara Colturi	(Argentina) Francesca Baruzzi	(Mexico) Sarah Schleper	
6	28 August 2022	(Chile) La Parva	Slalom	(Albania) Lara Colturi	(Argentina) Francesca Baruzzi	(United States) Chloe Lathrop	
7	30 August 2022	(Chile) La Parva	Downhill	(Austria) Vanessa Nussbaumer	(Austria) Sabrina Maier	(Bosnia and Herzegovina) Elvedina Muzaferija	
8	30 August 2022	(Chile) La Parva	Downhill	(Austria) Sabrina Maier	(Austria) Vanessa Nussbaumer	(Bosnia and Herzegovina) Elvedina Muzaferija	
9	31 August 2022	(Chile) La Parva	Super-G	(United States) Tricia Mangan	(Albania) Lara Colturi	(Bosnia and Herzegovina) Elvedina Muzaferija	
10	31 August 2022	(Chile) La Parva	Super-G	(United States) Tricia Mangan	(Albania) Lara Colturi	(Bosnia and Herzegovina) Elvedina Muzaferija	
11	1 September 2022	(Chile) La Parva	Alpine Combined	(Albania) Lara Colturi	(Argentina) Francesca Baruzzi	(Chile) Matilde Pinilla	
12	12 September 2022	(Argentina) Cerro Castor	Giant slalom	(Sweden) Sara Hector	(Sweden) Lisa Nyberg	(Sweden) Estelle Alphand	
13	13 September 2022	(Argentina) Cerro Castor	Giant slalom	(Sweden) Hilma Lövblom	(Sweden) Lisa Nyberg	(Sweden) Hanna Aronsson Elfman	
14	14 September 2022	(Argentina) Cerro Castor	Slalom	(Sweden) Hanna Aronsson Elfman	(Sweden) Charlotta Säfvenberg	(France) Chiara Pogneaux	
15	15 September 2022	(Argentina) Cerro Castor	Slalom	(France) Chiara Pogneaux	(Sweden) Hanna Aronsson Elfman	(Italy) Lara Della Mea	
16	27 September 2022	(Chile) Corralco	Downhill	(Norway) Malin Sofie Sund	(Chile) Florencia Aramburo	(Argentina) Sofía Bogni Barry	
17	28 September 2022	(Chile) Corralco	Downhill	(Norway) Malin Sofie Sund	(Argentina) Sofía Bogni Barry	(Argentina) Jazmin Fernandez	
	28 September 2022	(Chile) Corralco	Alpine Combined	cancelled			
18	29 September 2022	(Chile) Corralco	Super-G	(Norway) Malin Sofie Sund	(Chile) Florencia Aramburo	(Argentina) Sofía Bogni Barry	
19	29 September 2022	(Chile) Corralco	Alpine Combined	(Norway) Malin Sofie Sund	(Argentina) Sofía Bogni Barry	(Chile) Florencia Aramburo	

=== Rankings ===
==== Overall ====
Rank	after 25 of 25 races	Points
1	(Albania) Lara Colturi	879
2	(Argentina) Francesca Baruzzi Farriol	591
3	(Norway) Malin Sofie Sund	400
4	(Argentina) Sofia Bogni Barry	357
5	(Sweden) Hanna Aronsson Elfman	290

==== Downhill ====
Rank	after 5 of 5 races	Points
1	(Norway) Malin Sofie Sund	200
2	(Austria) Sabrina Maier	180
2	(Austria) Vanessa Nussbaumer	180
4	(Argentina) Sofia Bogni Barry	140
5	(Bosnia and Herzegovina) Elvedina Muzaferija	120

==== Super-G ====
Rank	after 3 of 3 races	Points
1	(United States) Tricia Mangan	200
2	(Albania) Lara Colturi	160
3	(Bosnia and Herzegovina) Elvedina Muzaferija	120
4	(Norway) Malin Sofie Sund	100
5	(Argentina) Francesca Baruzzi Farriol	95
5	(Canada) Stefanie Fleckenstein	95

==== Giant slalom ====
Rank	after 8 of 8 races	Points
1	(Albania) Lara Colturi	345
2	(Argentina) Francesca Baruzzi Farriol	220
3	(Mexico) Sarah Schleper	200
4	(Sweden) Lisa Nyberg	160
5	(Argentina) Maria Sibari	141

==== Slalom ====
Rank	after 7 of 7 races	Points
1	(Albania) Lara Colturi	274
2	(Argentina) Francesca Baruzzi Farriol	196
3	(Sweden) Hanna Aronsson Elfman	180
4	(France) Chiara Pogneaux	160
5	(United Kingdom) Giselle Gorringe	140

==== Alpine combined ====
Rank	after 2 of 2 races	Points
1	(Albania) Lara Colturi	100
1	(Norway) Malin Sofie Sund	100
3	(Argentina) Francesca Baruzzi Farriol	80
3	(Argentina) Sofia Bogni Barry	80
5	(Chile) Florencia Aramburo	60
