= Chile at the 1956 Winter Olympics =

- IOC code: CHI (CIL used at these Games)
- NOC: Chilean Olympic Committee
- Website: www.coch.cl (in Spanish)

in Cortina d'Ampezzo
- Competitors: 4 in 1 sport
- Officials: 4
- Medals: Gold 0 Silver 0 Bronze 0 Total 0

Winter Olympics appearances (overview)
- 1948; 1952; 1956; 1960; 1964; 1968; 1972; 1976; 1980; 1984; 1988; 1992; 1994; 1998; 2002; 2006; 2010; 2014; 2018; 2022; 2026

Chile competed at the 1956 Winter Olympics in Cortina d'Ampezzo, Italy. The nation sent four alpine skiers to the Games.

== Alpine skiing ==
Event	Name	Time	Rank
Men's downhill	Vicente Vera	4:25.4	41st
Men's giant slalom	Vicente Vera	4:10.6	72nd
Men's giant slalom	Sergio Navarrete	4:20.3	78th
Men's giant slalom	Arturo Hammersley	4:20.4	79th
Men's slalom	Vicente Vera	287.7	44th
Men's slalom	Arturo Hammersley	302.9	51st
Men's slalom	Sergio Navarrete	DNF	—

Hernan Oelckers is also listed as a member of the Chilean ski team, but did not compete.
