= Chile at the 2014 Winter Olympics =

- IOC code: CHI
- NOC: Chilean Olympic Committee
- Website: www.coch.cl (in Spanish)

in Sochi
- Competitors: 6 in 3 sports
- Flag bearer: Dominique Ohaco (opening) Yonathan Fernandez (closing)
- Medals: Gold 0 Silver 0 Bronze 0 Total 0

Winter Olympics appearances (overview)
- 1948; 1952; 1956; 1960; 1964; 1968; 1972; 1976; 1980; 1984; 1988; 1992; 1994; 1998; 2002; 2006; 2010; 2014; 2018; 2022; 2026; 2030

Chile competed at the 2014 Winter Olympics in Sochi, Russia, from 7 to 23 February 2014. Chile's team consisted of six athletes in three sports, doubling the number of athletes from four years ago.

The 2014 Games marked the first time a Chilean Olympic team competed in Russia, as Chile and 64 western countries took part at the American-led boycott in the 1980 Summer Olympics held in Moscow due to the Soviet–Afghan War.

== Competitors ==
Sport	Men	Women	Total
Alpine skiing	2	1	3
Cross-country skiing	1	0	1
Freestyle skiing	0	2	2
Total	3	3	6

== Alpine skiing ==
According to the final quota allocation released on 20 January 2014, Chile had three athletes in qualification position. The team consisted of:

Athlete	Event	Run 1		Run 2		Total	
Athlete	Event	Time	Rank	Time	Rank	Time	Rank
Eugenio Claro	Men's giant slalom	DNF					
Eugenio Claro	Men's slalom	57.08	63	DNF			
Eugenio Claro	Men's super-G	—				1:23.31	45
Henrik von Appen	Men's combined	1:58.49	40	1:00.42	30	2:58.91	32
Henrik von Appen	Men's downhill	—				2:13.16	41
Henrik von Appen	Men's giant slalom	DNF					
Henrik von Appen	Men's super-G	—				1:21.88	32
Noelle Barahona	Women's combined	DNF					
Noelle Barahona	Women's downhill	—				1:49.70	34
Noelle Barahona	Women's giant slalom	1:25.02	45	1:24.84	43	2:49.86	42
Noelle Barahona	Women's slalom	DNF					

== Cross-country skiing ==
According to the final quota allocation released on 20 January 2014, Chile had one athlete in qualification position. This marked the first time Chile competed in the sport at the Winter Olympics.

Sprint

Athlete	Event	Qualification		Quarterfinal		Semifinal		Final	
Athlete	Event	Time	Rank	Time	Rank	Time	Rank	Time	Rank
Yonathan Fernandez	Men's sprint	4:58.63	84	Did not advance					

== Freestyle skiing ==
According to the final quota allocation released on 20 January 2014, Chile had one athlete in qualification position. Chile has also received a reallocation quota in women's ski cross. Dominique Ohaco finished the women's slopestyle competition in 13th, one position out of qualifying for the final. This marked the first time Chile competed in the sport at the Winter Olympics.

Ski cross

Athlete	Event	Seeding		Round of 16	Quarterfinal	Semifinal	Final	
Athlete	Event	Time	Rank	Position	Position	Position	Position	Rank
Stephanie Joffroy	Women's ski cross	DNF	28	2 Q	DNF	Did not advance		16

Slopestyle

Athlete	Event	Qualification				Final			
Athlete	Event	Run 1	Run 2	Best	Rank	Run 1	Run 2	Best	Rank
Dominique Ohaco	Women's slopestyle	69.60	51.40	69.60	13	Did not advance			

== See also ==
- Chile at the 2014 Summer Youth Olympics
- Chile at the 2014 Winter Paralympics
