= Chile at the 1984 Winter Olympics =

- IOC code: CHI
- NOC: Chilean Olympic Committee
- Website: www.coch.cl (in Spanish)

in Sarajevo
- Competitors: 4 (men) in 1 sport
- Flag bearer: Alfredo Maturana
- Medals: Gold 0 Silver 0 Bronze 0 Total 0

Winter Olympics appearances (overview)
- 1948; 1952; 1956; 1960; 1964; 1968; 1972; 1976; 1980; 1984; 1988; 1992; 1994; 1998; 2002; 2006; 2010; 2014; 2018; 2022; 2026

Chile competed at the 1984 Winter Olympics in Sarajevo, Yugoslavia after missing the 1980 Winter Olympics.

== Alpine skiing ==
Men

Athlete	Event	Race 1		Race 2		Total	
Athlete	Event	Time	Rank	Time	Rank	Time	Rank
Miguel Purcell	Downhill					1:54.91	44
Hans Kossmann	Downhill					1:54.36	42
Andrés Figueroa	Downhill					1:52.97	41
Dieter Linneberg	Downhill					1:51.68	39
Hans Kossmann	Giant Slalom	DNF	–	–	–	DNF	–
Miguel Purcell	Giant Slalom	1:32.19	47	1:33.21	43	3:05.40	44
Dieter Linneberg	Giant Slalom	1:31.75	45	1:31.81	42	3:03.56	42
Andrés Figueroa	Giant Slalom	1:29.86	39	1:29.37	36	2:59.23	37
Miguel Purcell	Slalom	1:02.26	38	55.74	21	1:58.00	23
Hans Kossmann	Slalom	1:00.15	35	56.12	23	1:56.27	21
Dieter Linneberg	Slalom	59.86	33	55.92	22	1:55.78	20
Andrés Figueroa	Slalom	59.79	32	55.59	18	1:55.38	19

== Sources ==
- Official Olympic Reports
- Olympic Winter Games 1984, full results by sports-reference.com
