= Grob =

Grob may refer to:

- Grob Aircraft, a German aircraft manufacturer
- Grob fragmentation, an elimination reaction between an electrofuge and nucleofuge on an aliphatic chain
- Grob (surname), a list of people with the surname
- GrOb or Grazhdanskaya Oborona, a Russian punk band
- Grob Gob Glob Grod, a characters in the animated series Adventure Time

== See also ==
- Chorvátsky Grob, a village and municipality in western Slovakia in Senec District in the Bratislava region
- Slovenský Grob, a village and municipality in western Slovakia in Pezinok District in the Bratislava region
- Veľký Grob, a village and municipality in Galanta District of the Trnava Region of south-west Slovakia
- Grob's Attack, an opening in Chess
