= Chile at the 2026 Winter Olympics =

- Flag of Chile
- IOC code: CHI
- NOC: Chilean Olympic Committee
- Website: www.coch.cl (in Spanish)

in Milan and Cortina d'Ampezzo, Italy 6 February 2026 – 22 February 2026
- Competitors: 4 (2 men and 2 women) in 3 sports
- Flag bearers (opening): Sebastián Endrestad & Matilde Schwencke
- Flag bearer (closing): Stephanie Joffroy
- Medals: Gold 0 Silver 0 Bronze 0 Total 0

Winter Olympics appearances (overview)
- 1948; 1952; 1956; 1960; 1964; 1968; 1972; 1976; 1980; 1984; 1988; 1992; 1994; 1998; 2002; 2006; 2010; 2014; 2018; 2022; 2026

Chile competed at the 2026 Winter Olympics in Milan and Cortina d'Ampezzo, Italy, from 6 to 22 February 2026.

Cross-country skier Sebastián Endrestad and alpine skier Matilde Schwencke were the country's flagbearer during the opening ceremony. Meanwhile, freestyle skier Stephanie Joffroy was the country's flagbearer during the closing ceremony.

== Competitors ==
The following is the list of number of competitors participating at the Games per sport/discipline.

Sport	Men	Women	Total
Alpine skiing	1	1	2
Cross-country skiing	1	0	1
Freestyle skiing	0	1	1
Total	2	2	4

== Alpine skiing ==
Chile qualified one female and one male alpine skier through the basic quota. Henrik von Appen qualified for the games but had to withdraw due to an injury.

Athlete	Event	Run 1		Run 2		Total	
Athlete	Event	Time	Rank	Time	Rank	Time	Rank
Tomás Holscher	Men's giant slalom	1:19.92	34	1:13.57	30	2:33.49	30
Tomás Holscher	Men's slalom	1:03.94	27	59.89	22	2:03.83	24
Matilde Schwencke	Women's downhill	—N/a				1:43.31	27
Matilde Schwencke	Women's super-G	—N/a				DNF	

== Cross-country skiing ==
Chile qualified one male cross-country skier through the basic quota.

Distance

Athlete	Event	Classical		Freestyle		Total	
Athlete	Event	Time	Rank	Time	Rank	Time	Rank
Sebastián Endrestad	Men's 10 km freestyle	—N/a		26:21.0	92	—N/a	
Sebastián Endrestad	Men's skiathlon	29:26.8	73	LAP			72
Sebastián Endrestad	Men's 50 km classical	LAP	56	—N/a			

Sprint

Athlete	Event	Qualification		Quarterfinal		Semifinal		Final	
Athlete	Event	Time	Rank	Time	Rank	Time	Rank	Time	Rank
Sebastián Endrestad	Men's sprint	3:43.31	86	Did not advance					

== Freestyle skiing ==
Ski cross

Athlete	Event	Seeding		1/8 final	Quarterfinal	Semifinal	Final	
Athlete	Event	Time	Rank	Position	Position	Position	Position	Rank
Stephanie Joffroy	Women's ski cross	1:15.70	20	3	Did not advance			

== See also ==
- Chile at the 2026 Winter Paralympics
