= Chile at the 1960 Winter Olympics =

- IOC code: CHI
- NOC: Chilean Olympic Committee
- Website: www.coch.cl (in Spanish)

in Squaw Valley
- Competitors: 5 (men) in 1 sport
- Flag bearer: Vicente Vera
- Medals: Gold 0 Silver 0 Bronze 0 Total 0

Winter Olympics appearances (overview)
- 1948; 1952; 1956; 1960; 1964; 1968; 1972; 1976; 1980; 1984; 1988; 1992; 1994; 1998; 2002; 2006; 2010; 2014; 2018; 2022; 2026

Chile competed at the 1960 Winter Olympics in Squaw Valley, United States.

== Alpine skiing ==
Men

Athlete	Event	Race 1		Race 2		Total	
Athlete	Event	Time	Rank	Time	Rank	Time	Rank
Víctor Tagle	Downhill					2:26.9	39
Hernán Boher	Downhill					2:26.7	38
Vicente Vera	Downhill					2:24.5	32
Francisco Cortes	Downhill					2:20.8	31
Hernán Boher	Giant Slalom					2:28.5	56
Francisco Cortes	Giant Slalom					2:14.3	46
Vicente Vera	Giant Slalom					2:07.7	38
Mario Vera	Giant Slalom					2:06.8	36
Víctor Tagle	Slalom	DSQ	–	–	–	DSQ	–
Francisco Cortes	Slalom	n/a	n/a	DSQ	–	DSQ	–
Hernán Boher	Slalom	1:24.2	37	1:22.9	28	2:47.1	28
Vicente Vera	Slalom	1:20.4	29	DSQ	–	DSQ	–
