= Chile at the 1968 Winter Olympics =

- IOC code: CHI
- NOC: Chilean Olympic Committee
- Website: www.coch.cl (in Spanish)

in Grenoble
- Competitors: 4 (3 men, 1 woman) in 1 sport
- Medals: Gold 0 Silver 0 Bronze 0 Total 0

Winter Olympics appearances (overview)
- 1948; 1952; 1956; 1960; 1964; 1968; 1972; 1976; 1980; 1984; 1988; 1992; 1994; 1998; 2002; 2006; 2010; 2014; 2018; 2022; 2026

Chile competed at the 1968 Winter Olympics in Grenoble, France.

== Alpine skiing ==
Men

Athlete	Event	Race 1		Race 2		Total	
Athlete	Event	Time	Rank	Time	Rank	Time	Rank
Felipe Briones	Downhill					2:18.07	60
Richard Leatherbee	Downhill					2:17.86	58
Mario Vera	Downhill					2:10.44	46
Felipe Briones	Giant Slalom	2:01.83	70	2:01.97	67	4:03.80	66
Mario Vera	Giant Slalom	1:56.46	58	1:56.04	45	3:52.50	51
Richard Leatherbee	Giant Slalom	1:53.53	48	1:57.18	52	3:50.71	48

Men's slalom

Athlete	Heat 1		Heat 2		Final					
Athlete	Time	Rank	Time	Rank	Time 1	Rank	Time 2	Rank	Total	Rank
Felipe Briones	59.76	4	DNF	–	did not advance					
Mario Vera	1:06.02	5	58.05	2	did not advance					
Richard Leatherbee	54.47	3	55.51	1 QF	56.26	40	DSQ	–	DSQ	–

Women

Athlete	Event	Race 1		Race 2		Total	
Athlete	Event	Time	Rank	Time	Rank	Time	Rank
Verena Vogt	Giant Slalom					2:13.18	41
Verena Vogt	Slalom	n/a	?	DNF	–	DNF	–
