= Stephanie Joffroy =

Chilean freestyle skier (born 1991)

Personal information
- Born: 12 September 1991 (age 34) Santiago, Chile

Sport
- Sport: Skiing

Stephanie Joffroy (born 12 September 1991 in Santiago, Chile) is a competitor in Women's ski cross at the 2014 Winter Olympics, 2018 Winter Olympics, and 2026 Winter Olympics. Her highest qualification was in 20th and has so far proceeded to the quarter finals in 2014.

== Biography and career ==
Joffroy was born and raised in Chile until she was 14, when she moved with her family to France. She has continued to split her time between France and Chile where she worked as a ski instructor and competed in the first ski cross races held in Chile.

After qualifying for the 2014 Olympics, Joffroy was injured in the midst of the competition. Injuries plagued her for the next three years and although she returned to the World Cup circuit and the Olympics in 2018, further injuries prevented success.

Joffroy was on-track to qualify leading up to 2022 Olympics in Beijing, but injury at the World Cup six weeks prior to the Games prevented a return. Joffroy qualified again for 2026 and skied through the 1/8 rounds. She was chosen as closing flag-bearer for 2026.
