= Fernando González =

Chilean tennis player (born 1980)

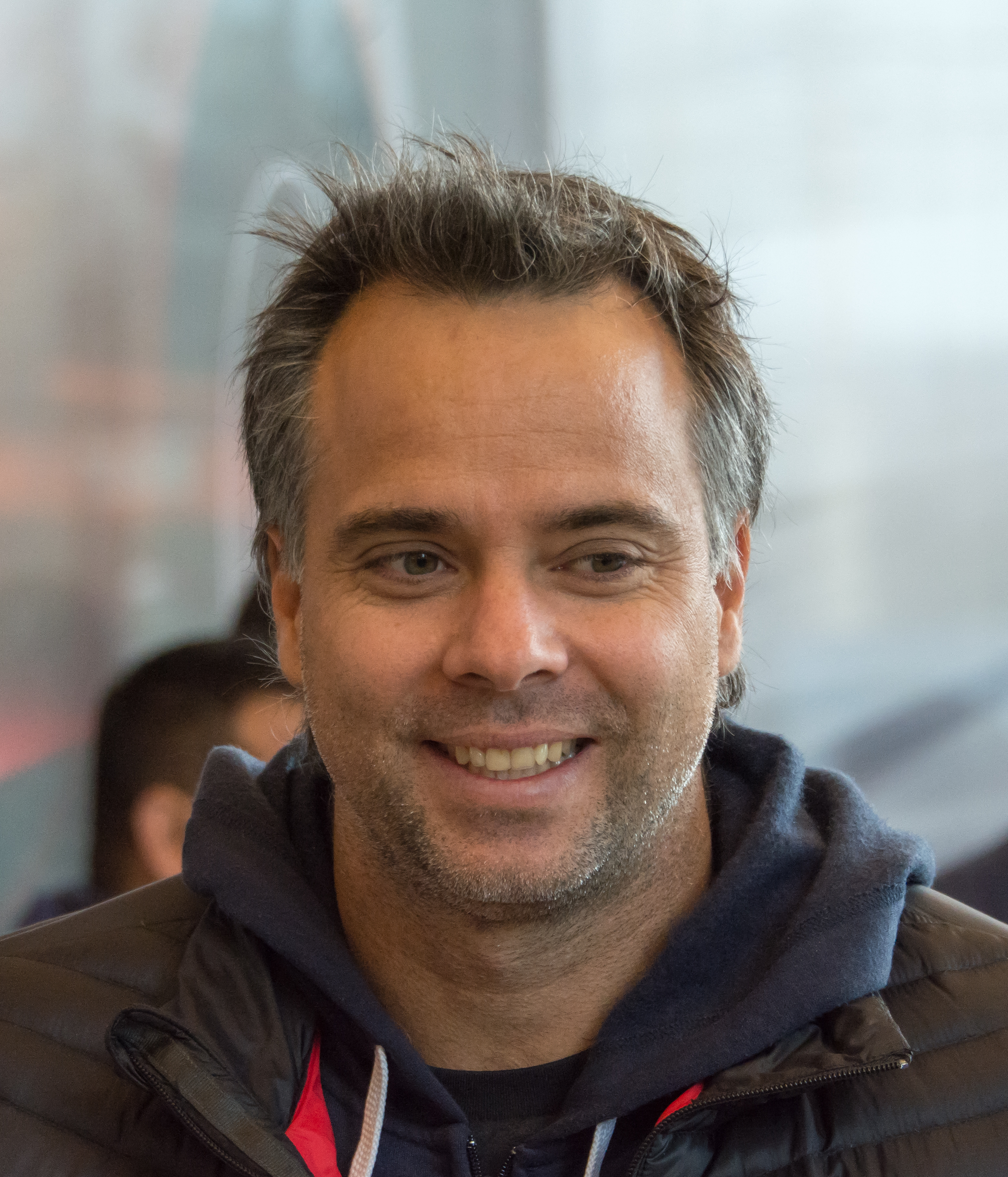
- González at the 2019 Pan American Games
- Country (sports): Chile
- Residence: Miami, United States
- Born: 29 July 1980 (age 46) Santiago, Chile
- Height: 1.83 m (6 ft 0 in)
- Turned pro: 1999
- Retired: 2012
- Plays: Right-handed (one-handed backhand)
- Prize money: $8,862,276

Singles
- Career record: 370–202 (64.7%)
- Career titles: 11
- Highest ranking: No. 5 (29 January 2007)

Grand Slam singles results
- Australian Open: F (2007)
- French Open: SF (2009)
- Wimbledon: QF (2005)
- US Open: QF (2002, 2009)

Other tournaments
- Tour Finals: RR (2005, 2007)
- Olympic Games: F (2008)

Doubles
- Career record: 109–98 (52.7%)
- Career titles: 3
- Highest ranking: No. 25 (4 July 2005)

Grand Slam doubles results
- Australian Open: QF (2010)
- French Open: SF (2005)
- Wimbledon: 2R (2005)
- US Open: QF (2004)

Other doubles tournaments
- Olympic Games: W (2004)

Mixed doubles
- Career record: 3–2
- Career titles: 0

Grand Slam mixed doubles results
- French Open: QF (2006)
- Wimbledon: 2R (2006)

Team competitions
- Davis Cup: QF (2006, 2010)

Coaching career (2018–)
- Elias Ymer (August 2018–)
Medal record
Olympic Games
Gold medal – first place	2004 Athens	Doubles
Silver medal – second place	2008 Beijing	Singles
Bronze medal – third place	2004 Athens	Singles

Fernando Francisco González Ciuffardi (Latin American Spanish: [feɾˈnando ɣonˈsales]; (Note: In isolation, González is pronounced [ɡonˈsales].) born 29 July 1980) is a Chilean former professional tennis player. During his career, he reached at least the quarterfinals of all four major tournaments. He contested his only major final at the 2007 Australian Open, losing to top-seeded Roger Federer. González is the fourth man in history to have won an Olympic tennis medal in every color, with gold in doubles and bronze in singles at Athens 2004, and silver in singles at Beijing 2008. The gold medal that González won partnering Nicolás Massú at the 2004 Olympics in men's doubles was Chile's first-ever Olympic gold medal. During his career, González defeated many top players, including Lleyton Hewitt, Andre Agassi, Roger Federer (all while they held the top spot), Novak Djokovic, Rafael Nadal, Andy Roddick, Juan Carlos Ferrero, Carlos Moyá, Gustavo Kuerten, Marat Safin, Pete Sampras, and Andy Murray. González qualified twice for the year-end Masters Cup event and was runner-up at two Masters Series tournaments. González was known for having one of the strongest forehands on the tour. In Spanish he is nicknamed El Bombardero de La Reina ("The Bomber from La Reina") and Mano de Piedra ("Hand of Stone").

== Tennis career ==
=== Early years ===
At the age of four, González split his time playing both football and tennis. His father, an amateur tennis player, was able to persuade his son to choose tennis over football. González began playing tennis at the age of six and moved with his family to La Reina, in eastern Santiago, where he practiced with his coach Claudio González (no relation) at Club La Reina three times a week.

In 1988, when he was eight years old, González and his father spent a month and a half in the United States, training and participating in tennis championships. In 1992, his entire family moved to the U.S. for four years. They settled in Miami, where González honed his skills at the Patricio Apey Academy.

González played his first junior match in August 1995 at the age of 15, at a grade 5 tournament in El Salvador. As a junior, he won the US Open boys' doubles (with compatriot Nicolás Massú) in 1997, and the French Open singles (defeating a young Juan Carlos Ferrero in the final) and doubles (with Venezuelan José de Armas) in 1998. That year, at the age of 17, he made his Davis Cup debut in Chile's tie against Argentina, losing in four sets to Franco Squillari. He won his first Davis Cup tie in a doubles rubber, partnering with Massú. González reached as high as No. 4 in the world in singles and No. 2 in doubles.

González achieved success at the Futures level in 1998. In the three Futures events held in Chile that year, he reached two semifinals and defeated Italian Enzo Artoni in the final in Santiago.

Junior Grand Slam results - Singles:

Australian Open: A (-)
French Open: W (1998)
Wimbledon: 3R (1997)
US Open: QF (1998)

Junior Grand Slam results - Doubles:

Australian Open: A (-)
French Open: W (1998)
Wimbledon: 1R (1997)
US Open: W (1997)

=== Playing style ===
González was a power baseliner, with one of the best forehands in the game, according to renowned tennis coach Patrick Mouratoglou, who described González's forehand as a "weapon of mass destruction" by virtue of its heavy topsin and González's ability to flatten out the forehand to hit with tremendous power and miles per hour.

=== 1999–2004 ===
González became a professional in 1999. Early in the year, he played mainly at the Futures level. He reached his first Challenger quarterfinal in Edinburgh and played his first ATP tournament in Washington, where he defeated Ivan Ljubičić in the first round before losing to Marc Rosset.

González won his first ATP Tour title in May 2000 when he defeated Massú at the U.S. Men's Clay Court Championships final in Orlando, Florida. It was the first all-Chilean ATP final since Jaime Fillol defeated Ricardo Acuña in the 1982 Itaparica final.

In January 2001, González played at the Australian Open for the first time, losing in the first round to Guillermo Coria in four sets. In May, he made his debut at Roland Garros's main singles draw, reaching the second round. He continued to play Challengers and smaller ATP events throughout the year, with notable results including a final at the Montevideo Challenger (losing to David Nalbandian), and semifinals at Zagreb and Lima.

In February 2002, González won his second career ATP title in Viña del Mar by defeating Nicolás Lapentti in the final. Later that year, he won his third title in Palermo, Italy, and reached the semifinals at the Cincinnati Masters (defeating seeded Tim Henman and Andy Roddick en route), and the quarterfinals at the US Open. In September, he surpassed former No. 1 player Marcelo Ríos as the top Chilean in the singles rankings and was one of the most improved players on the ATP Tour, jumping 123 positions in the ATP singles rankings.

In May 2003, González reached the quarterfinals of Hamburg and the French Open. In between, he won the World Team Cup for Chile, winning all his singles and doubles matches. Later that year, he reached the finals of Washington and Metz and made the Stuttgart semifinals. In doubles, he and partner Tommy Robredo reached the semifinals in Miami.

In February 2004, González repeated his Viña del Mar title by defeating Gustavo Kuerten in the final. He also retained the World Team Cup with Chile. In August, at the Olympic Games in Athens, he and doubles partner Massú gave their country its first-ever Olympic gold medal when they defeated Nicolas Kiefer and Rainer Schüttler of Germany to win the men's doubles tournament. He also won a bronze medal in the men's singles. González had to play the bronze medal match against Taylor Dent and the doubles final on the same day. Additionally, he saved match points in both games, most notably four match points in the doubles final in the fourth-set tiebreak.

=== 2005 ===
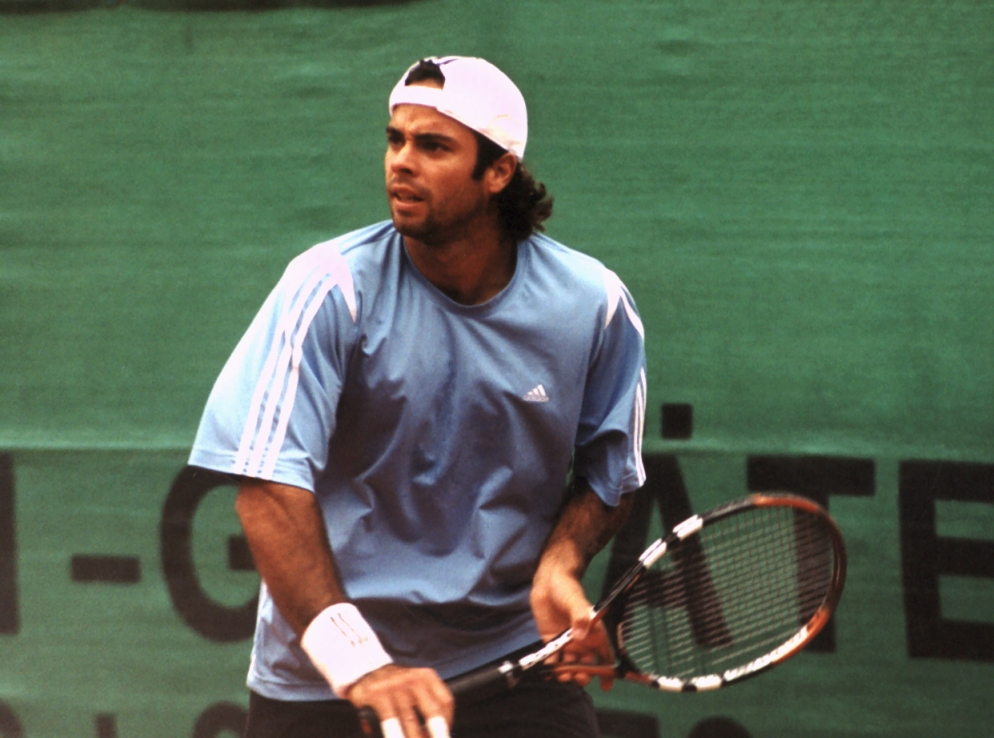
Fernando González at training for the World Team Cup, in 2005

González began the season by taking the title in Auckland, New Zealand, which was his first hard court title. In April, he won his first ATP doubles tournament (and second after the Olympics) in Valencia (clay) with doubles partner Martín Rodríguez. After reaching the quarterfinals at Wimbledon in June, he went on to win the ATP tournament in Amersfoort (clay), Netherlands, in the following month. He further proved his all-court versatility by winning the indoors-carpet singles title at Basel and also won the doubles title in the same tournament with partner Agustín Calleri. His results in 2005 were good enough for him to attend the year-end Masters Cup in Shanghai first as a reserve and then as a player after the withdrawal of Andre Agassi following his first match. González became the first Chilean to win a Masters match when he beat Mariano Puerta and missed out on making the semifinal—and finishing the year as No. 11—after losing to Gastón Gaudio in a match in which he had three match points.

=== 2006 ===
In April, González became the third Chilean (after Ríos and Massú) to break into the top 10 singles ranking. In May, he reached No. 10 in the world after winning a quarterfinal match at the Monte-Carlo Masters, shortly after parting ways with longtime coach Horacio de la Peña. He was then replaced by Larry Stefanki. After reaching his first Masters Series singles final in Madrid (losing to Roger Federer in straight sets) in October, he ascended to world No. 7. He finished the year ranked No. 10.

=== 2007 ===
In January, González reached the Australian Open singles final, becoming the first Chilean to have reached the quarterfinals in all four Grand Slam tournaments, and the fourth Chilean (third male) to reach a Grand Slam final. En route to the final, he defeated Evgeny Korolev, Juan Martín del Potro, Lleyton Hewitt, James Blake, world No. 2 Rafael Nadal, and Tommy Haas. He lost to world No. 1 Roger Federer in straight sets. On 29 January, he jumped to No. 5, his best career singles ranking, only five points behind No. 4. In May, he became the first Chilean to reach the finals of the Rome Masters since Ríos won the title in 1998. At the US Open, González was upset by Teymuraz Gabashvili in a five-set thriller. From July to August, González went on a five-match losing streak, which ended in September when he captured the China Open tournament title in Beijing. In November, he became the first Chilean since Ríos in 1998 to directly qualify for the Tennis Masters Cup. In his opening match, he staged a huge upset by beating top-ranked Federer for the first time in eleven encounters. He then lost to Andy Roddick and Nikolay Davydenko, finishing last in his group. He ended the season at No. 7, his highest year-end ranking to date.

=== 2008 ===
At the Australian Open in January, González failed to defend all his points from the previous year, causing him to fall from No. 7 to No. 24 in the ATP singles rankings. However, he bounced back the following week, winning his home event at Viña del Mar for the third time and rising to No. 16. In May, he won his tenth ATP title at the BMW Open in Munich. The following month, he reached the quarterfinals of the French Open for the second time, losing to top seed Roger Federer in four sets.

In August, González represented Chile at the Beijing Olympics in both singles and doubles events, where he was his country's standard-bearer at the opening ceremony. As in Athens 2004, he partnered with Massú in doubles, but was unable to defend his gold, exiting in the first round. In singles, he improved his Olympic record, clinching a silver medal after beating James Blake in the semifinals. In the gold medal match, he lost in straight sets to Rafael Nadal.

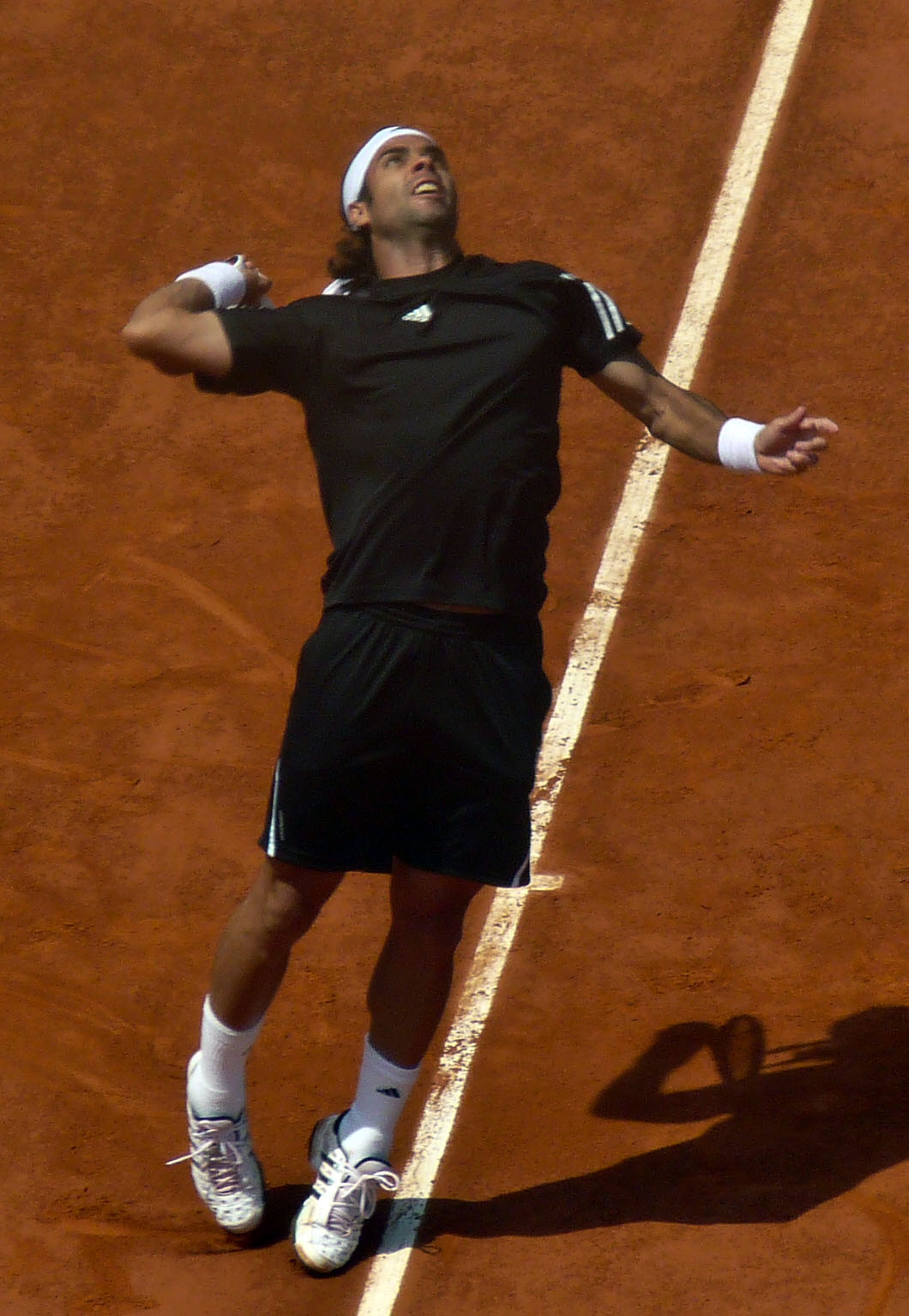
González made the semi-finals of the 2009 French Open, his career-best performance at the tournament.

At the US Open in September, he lost in the fourth round to former local champion Andy Roddick, 2–6, 4–6, 1–6. He ended the season at No. 15. In November, at the end of the season, Stefanki stopped coaching González after receiving a job offer from Roddick. On 12 December, González announced he had hired former Argentine player Martín Rodríguez as his new full-time coach for 2009.

=== 2009 ===
In the first round of the Australian Open, González prevailed in a five-set thriller over Lleyton Hewitt, which lasted for 3 hours and 7 minutes. In the third round, he came back from two sets down to defeat Richard Gasquet of France in a match that lasted over four hours, with a score of 3–6, 3–6, 7–6, 6–2, 12–10. However, he bowed out of the tournament with a straight-sets defeat against world No. 1 and eventual champion Rafael Nadal in the fourth round.

At the Viña del Mar tournament in February, González claimed victory once again, taking the title for the fourth time in five finals. He overpowered all of his opponents with a solid display of tennis and did not drop a set throughout the entire tournament. In the final, he defeated his good friend José Acasuso, 6–1, 6–3. With this win, he returned to the top 15 in singles.

In early March, González missed the Davis Cup tie against Croatia due to a back injury. In April, he resigned from the Chile Davis Cup team, citing a violation of a confidentiality agreement. The local tennis federation had disclosed the amount of money won by the players at the tie against Australia. He conditioned his return on the resignation of the federation's current directive and promised to relinquish all his future Davis Cup proceeds for the "benefit of younger players."

At the start of the clay-court season, González reached the semifinals in Barcelona and Rome. However, he had to withdraw from Munich and Madrid after twisting his ankle while signing autographs in Rome. At the French Open, he reached the semifinals for the first time by beating third seed Andy Murray in the quarterfinals. In the semifinals, he played Robin Söderling, who had previously defeated top seed Rafael Nadal and Nikolay Davydenko. González came just two games away from winning that match during the fifth set, after holding an advantage of 4–1.

At the US Open, González reached the quarterfinals for the second time, beating seventh seed Jo-Wilfried Tsonga in the fourth round. He was defeated by third seed Rafael Nadal in a match repeatedly delayed by rain. The match was suspended on Thursday night with González trailing, 6–7, 6–6, down 2–3 in the tiebreaker. When the match resumed on Saturday, González was visibly flat, losing the remaining four points in the tiebreaker and not winning a game in the third set.

With his notable performances at the French and US Open, González achieved a career-high 14 victories in Grand Slam events during the year.

=== 2010 ===
González won against Olivier Rochus, Marsel İlhan, and Evgeny Korolev at the Australian Open, but lost to Andy Roddick in the fourth round in a tense and controversial five-set match that lasted for 3 hours and 25 minutes. During the match, there was a disputed set point in the fourth set when a Roddick forehand winner was called out. Roddick challenged the call and Hawk-eye technology revealed that the ball was in. Therefore, Roddick won the set. González believed the point should have been replayed as he was in the right position and could have made a play on the ball if it had been called in. González lost the match in five sets.

Afterwards, González participated in the Movistar Open, which was held in Santiago for the first time that year instead of Viña del Mar, where he had won the previous two years. He made it to the semifinals but lost to Thomaz Bellucci in three sets despite being a break up in the second set and only two games away from victory.

In the Abierto Mexicano Telcel, González made it to the semifinals, defeating Sam Querrey, Victor Hănescu, and Eduardo Schwank in three sets before suffering a bad loss to David Ferrer. He then chose to skip the 1000 Masters in Indian Wells to travel to areas affected by the 8.8 magnitude earthquake in Chile.

In early March, González and his teammates defeated Israel in the Davis Cup to advance Chile to the quarterfinals. He then returned to the ATP Tour Masters 1000 in Miami, where he lost in the fourth round to Robin Söderling. He also hosted a benefit for the Chilean earthquake victims called Champions for Chile, appearing alongside Andy Roddick, Jim Courier, and Gustavo Kuerten.

During the clay season, González played only one tournament in Houston, where he reached the quarterfinals. At Roland Garros, he was defeated in the second round and was sidelined for almost three months with a knee injury.

González returned to play in New Haven, where he lost in the second round to Radek Štěpánek. At the US Open, he retired from his first-round match against Ivan Dodig. On 21 September, González announced that he would undergo surgery on his right hip and possibly his right knee on 4 October, and was expected to be out for eight to nine months.

=== 2011 ===
González announced he would return to Belgrade for "the start of the end of my career." He defeated Alexandr Dolgopolov in the first round of Wimbledon and made it to the third round, but lost to Jo-Wilfried Tsonga in straight sets.

=== 2012 ===
On 9 February 2012, González announced that he would retire from professional tennis after the Miami Masters. He played his last professional match on 21 March 2012 at Miami, losing in three sets to Nicolas Mahut in the first round.

== Personal life ==
González was born in Santiago. His father, Fernando González Ramírez, is the manager of the Molina flour mill in Santiago, and his mother, Patricia Ciuffardi, a housewife of Italian descent. He has an older sister, Patricia, and a younger sister, Jéssica. He studied primary school at Colegio de La Salle and finished secondary school at Colegio Terra Nova.

Since 2017, he had been in a relationship with retired Argentine field hockey player Luciana Aymar, and they have two children: a son, Félix, born in 2019, and a daughter, Lupe, born in 2021.

In July 2022, González announced that he and his family would be moving to Miami.

== Career statistics ==
=== Grand Slam singles performance timeline ===
Key
W	F	SF	QF	#R	RR	Q#	DNQ	A	NH

(W) winner; (F) finalist; (SF) semifinalist; (QF) quarterfinalist; (#R) rounds 4, 3, 2, 1; (RR) round-robin stage; (Q#) qualification round; (DNQ) did not qualify; (A) absent; (NH) not held; (SR) strike rate (events won / competed); (W–L) win–loss record.

Tournament	1998	1999	2000	2001	2002	2003	2004	2005	2006	2007	2008	2009	2010	2011	2012	W–L
Australian Open	A	A	A	1R	4R	2R	1R	3R	1R	F	3R	4R	4R	A	A	20–10
French Open	A	A	Q1	2R	3R	QF	1R	3R	2R	1R	QF	SF	2R	A	A	20–10
Wimbledon	A	A	A	Q1	2R	1R	3R	QF	3R	3R	2R	3R	A	3R	A	16–9
US Open	A	A	2R	Q1	QF	3R	1R	3R	3R	1R	4R	QF	1R	1R	A	18–11
Win–loss	0–0	0–0	1–1	1–2	10–4	7–4	2–4	10–4	5–4	8–4	10–4	14–4	4–3	2–2	0–0	74–40

=== Grand Slam finals ===
==== Singles: 1 (1 runner-up) ====
Result	Year	Championship	Surface	Opponent	Score
Loss	2007	Australian Open	Hard	(Switzerland) Roger Federer	6–7^{(2–7)}, 4–6, 4–6

=== Olympic gold medal matches ===
Result	Year	Tournament	Surface	Opponent	Score
Silver	2008	Summer Olympics	Hard	(Spain) Rafael Nadal	3–6, 6–7^{(2–7)}, 3–6

== Notes ==
Olympic Games
Preceded by Daniela Anguita	Flagbearer for Chile; 2008 Beijing	Succeeded by Jorge Mandrú
