= Chile at the 2010 Winter Olympics =

- IOC code: CHI
- NOC: Chilean Olympic Committee
- Website: www.coch.cl (in Spanish)

in Vancouver
- Competitors: 3 in 1 sport
- Flag bearers: Jorge Mandrú (opening); Noelle Barahona (closing)
- Medals: Gold 0 Silver 0 Bronze 0 Total 0

Winter Olympics appearances (overview)
- 1948; 1952; 1956; 1960; 1964; 1968; 1972; 1976; 1980; 1984; 1988; 1992; 1994; 1998; 2002; 2006; 2010; 2014; 2018; 2022; 2026

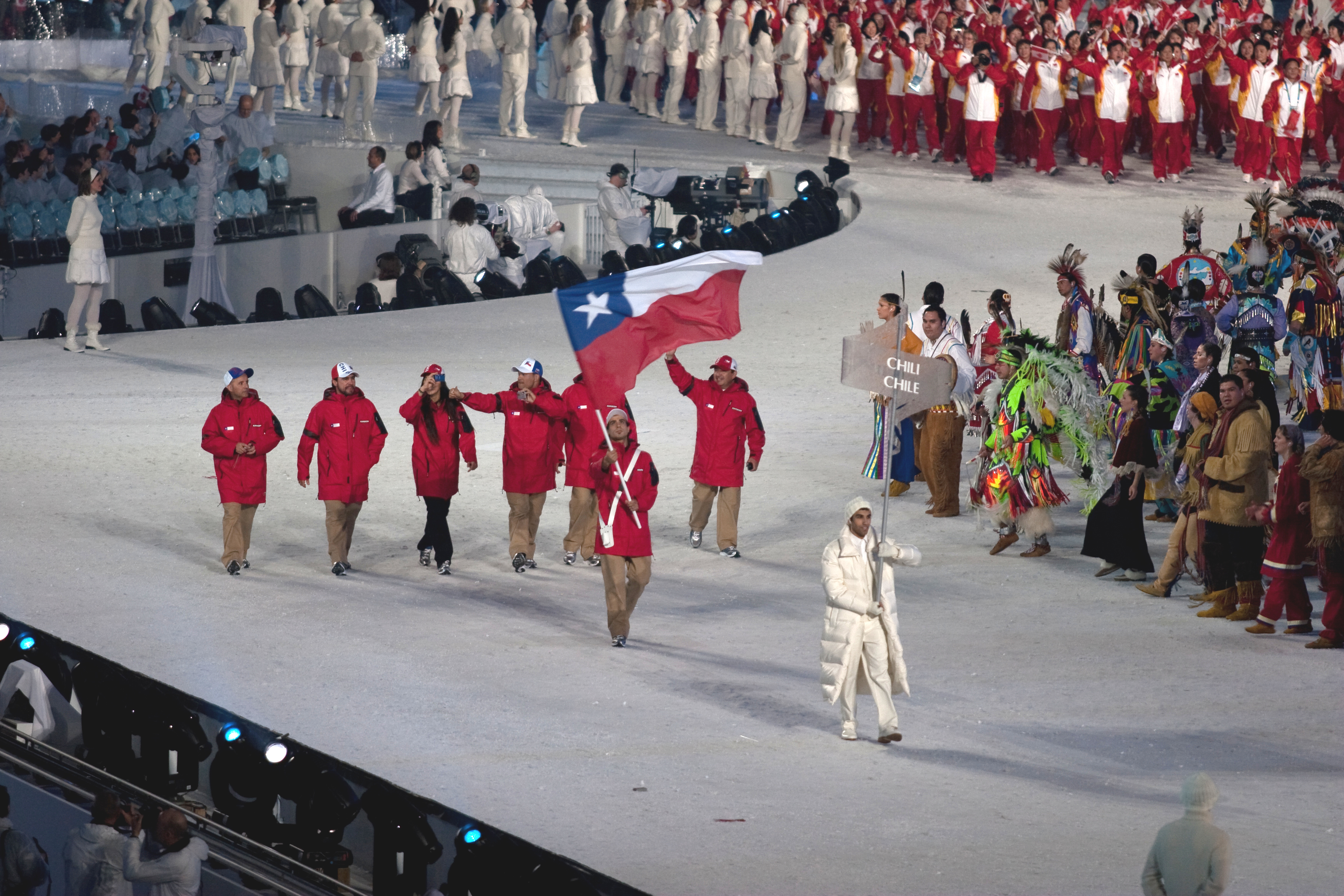
The athletes entering the stadium during the opening ceremonies.

Chile competed in the 2010 Winter Olympics in Vancouver, British Columbia, Canada.

== Alpine skiing ==
Men

Athlete	Event	Time	Rank
Maui Gayme	Men's downhill	1:59.76	49
Maui Gayme	Men's super-G	1:36.56	42
Jorge Mandrú	Men's downhill	2:01.72	56
Jorge Mandrú	Men's super-G	did not finish	
Jorge Mandrú	Men's slalom	did not start	
Jorge Mandrú	Men's giant slalom	2:51.55	52

Women

Athlete	Event	Time	Rank
Noelle Barahona	Women's downhill	1:57.47	34
Noelle Barahona	Women's super-G	1:28.66	35
Noelle Barahona	Women's combined	2:24.25	28
Noelle Barahona	Women's slalom	1:57.82	41
Noelle Barahona	Women's giant slalom	did not finish	

== Earthquake in Chile ==
On 27 February 2010, an 8.8 magnitude earthquake struck Chile. As a result, Chilean athletes Jorge Mandrú and Maui Gayme chose not to take part in the closing ceremony out of respect for the victims of the earthquake. Noelle Barahona, the only athlete to remain in Vancouver, carried the flag at the closing ceremony.

== See also ==
- Chile at the Olympics
- Chile at the 2010 Winter Paralympics

== Notes and references ==
=== References ===
- "Athletes (Chile)". Vancouver 2010 Winter Olympics and Paralympics. The Vancouver Organizing Committee for the 2010 Olympic and Paralympic Winter Games. Archived from the original on 11 March 2010.
