= Chile at the 1964 Winter Olympics =

- IOC code: CHI
- NOC: Chilean Olympic Committee
- Website: www.coch.cl (in Spanish)

in Innsbruck
- Competitors: 5 (men) in 1 sport
- Medals: Gold 0 Silver 0 Bronze 0 Total 0

Winter Olympics appearances (overview)
- 1948; 1952; 1956; 1960; 1964; 1968; 1972; 1976; 1980; 1984; 1988; 1992; 1994; 1998; 2002; 2006; 2010; 2014; 2018; 2022; 2026

Chile competed at the 1964 Winter Olympics in Innsbruck, Austria.

== Alpine skiing ==
Men

Athlete	Event	Race	
Athlete	Event	Time	Rank
Claudio Wernli	Downhill	DSQ	–
Juan Holz	Downhill	4:51.18	77
Hernán Boher	Downhill	2:41.67	58
Juan Holz	Giant Slalom	DNF	–
Francisco Cortes	Giant Slalom	2:22.08	66
Claudio Wernli	Giant Slalom	2:14.48	54
Hernán Boher	Giant Slalom	2:09.71	44

Men's slalom

Athlete	Qualifying				Final					
Athlete	Time 1	Rank	Time 2	Rank	Time 1	Rank	Time 2	Rank	Total	Rank
Hernán Boher	DNF	–	1:01.95	33	did not advance					
Vicente Vera	1:14.82	73	DNF	–	did not advance					
Juan Holz	1:07.56	59	1:04.38	38	did not advance					
Francisco Cortes	1:04.43	52	DNF	–	did not advance					
