= Roberto Koifman =

Chilean alpine skier (born 1956)

Personal information
- Nationality: Chilean
- Born: 21 August 1956 (age 68)

Sport
- Sport: Alpine skiing

Roberto Koifman (born 21 August 1956) is a Chilean alpine skier. He competed in two events at the 1976 Winter Olympics.
