= Maui Gayme =

Chilean alpine skier (born 1983)

Maui Gayme (born October 30, 1983, in Papeete) is an alpine skier who represented Chile at the 2002 Winter Olympics and at the 2006 Winter Olympics. He also represented Chile at the 2010 Winter Olympics. He finished 57th in the Downhill discipline at the 2010 Winter Olympics.
