= Daniela Anguita =

Chilean alpine skier (born 1984)

Personal information
- Nationality: Chilean
- Born: 27 June 1984 (age 40); Barcelona, Spain

Sport
- Sport: Alpine skiing

Daniela Anguita Loux (born 27 June 1984) is a Chilean former alpine skier. She competed in the women's super-G at the 2006 Winter Olympics.

Olympic Games
Preceded by Kristel Köbrich	Flagbearer for Chile; Torino 2006	Succeeded by Fernando González
