= Pedro Aguirrebeña =

Chilean water polo player (1917–2009)

Personal information
- Nationality: Chile
- Born: 1 July 1917 Santiago, Chile
- Died: 6 November 2009 (aged 92)

Sport
- Sport: Water polo

Pedro Aguirrebeña (1 July 1917 – 6 November 2009) was a Chilean water polo player. He competed in the 1948 Summer Olympics. His older brother Luis was also a water polo player.
