= Luis Aguirrebeña =

Chilean water polo player (1915–1979)

Personal information
- Full name: Luis Aguirrebeña Gabiola
- Nationality: Chile
- Born: 26 August 1915 Santiago, Chile
- Died: 28 June 1979 (aged 63) Santiago, Chile

Sport
- Sport: Water polo

Luis Aguirrebeña Gabiola (26 August 1915 – 28 June 1979) was a Chilean water polo player. He competed in the 1948 Summer Olympics.

Aguirrebeña died in Santiago on 28 June 1979, at the age of 63. His younger brother Pedro was also a water polo player.
