= Jorge Mandrú =

Chilean alpine skier (born 1986)

Jorge Mandrú (born May 5, 1986, in Osorno) is an alpine skier from Chile. He competed for Chile at the 2010 Winter Olympics. Mandrú was Chile's flag bearer during the 2010 Winter Olympics opening ceremony.

Olympic Games
Preceded by Fernando González	Flagbearer for Chile; Vancouver 2010	Succeeded by Denisse Van Lamoen
