= Anita Irarrázabal =

Chilean alpine skier (born 1982)

Personal information
- Born: 10 July 1982 (age 43) Santiago, Chile

Sport
- Sport: Alpine skiing

Anita Irarrázabal (born 10 July 1982) is a Chilean alpine skier. She competed in the women's super-G at the 2002 Winter Olympics.

Olympic Games
Preceded by Nicolás Massú	Flagbearer for Chile; Salt Lake 2002	Succeeded by Kristel Köbrich
