= Eduardo Silva =

Chilean alpine skier (1928–2017)

Personal information
- Nationality: Chilean
- Born: 7 October 1928
- Died: 17 July 2017 (aged 88)

Sport
- Sport: Alpine skiing

Eduardo Silva (7 October 1928 – 17 July 2017) was a Chilean alpine skier. He competed in three events at the 1952 Winter Olympics. Silva died in July 2017, aged 88.
