= José Luis Koifman =

Chilean alpine skier (born 1954)

Personal information
- Nationality: Chilean
- Born: 16 May 1954 (age 72)

Sport
- Sport: Alpine skiing

José Luis Koifman (born 16 May 1954) is a Chilean alpine skier. He competed in three events at the 1976 Winter Olympics.
