= Johannes Grob =

Swiss merchant, diplomat, and poet (1643–1697)

- Born: 16 September 1643; Oberglatt (now part of Flawil)
- Died: 1 April 1697 (aged 53); Herisau
- Occupations: Merchant, diplomat, poet
- Spouse: Katharina Ziegler

Johannes Grob (16 September 1643 – 1 April 1697) was a Swiss merchant, diplomat, and poet from Enzenschwil (later Grobenentschwil, now part of Flawil) who became a citizen of Herisau in 1690.

He is known for his political writings and epigram collections published in the late seventeenth century.

== Life ==
Grob was born on 16 September 1643 in Oberglatt (now part of the municipality of Flawil). He was the son of Johannes Grob, ammann and commissioner of the country, and Protestant.

He attended the Gymnasium in Zurich in 1658, and subsequently served as a musketeer in the guard of John George II, Elector of Saxony in Dresden from 1661 to 1664. During this period he also travelled to Hamburg, London, Amsterdam, and Paris.

In 1664, Grob took over his father's linen trade. He also served as commissioner in Toggenburg. Following a conflict with the Prince-Abbot of Saint-Gall, he emigrated around 1675 to Herisau. Entrusted with a diplomatic mission to Emperor Leopold I, he was ennobled in 1690. He married Katharina Ziegler, daughter of Adrian Ziegler, a physician in Gais.

He was a member of the Grand Council of Herisau until his death, serving as treasurer of the poor relief fund and as Bauherr.

== Works ==
Grob authored the political pamphlet Treugemeinter Eydgnösischer Aufwecker (1689) and two collections of epigrams: Dichterische Versuchgabe (1678) and Reinholds von Freyenthals Poetisches Spazierwäldlein (1700).

== Bibliography ==
- E. Zschokke, Der Toggenburger Epigrammatiker Johannes Grob, 1890
- A. Lindquist, ed., Epigramme, 1929
- A. Steiger, Johannes Grob, 1946
- P. Michel, «Der Toggenburger Dichter Johannes Grob (1643–1697)», in Obrigkeit und Opposition, 1999, pp. 97–115
