= Federico García (skier) =

Chilean alpine skier (born 1951)

Personal information
- Nationality: Chilean
- Born: 3 September 1951 (age 73)

Sport
- Sport: Alpine skiing

Federico García (born 3 September 1951) is a Chilean alpine skier. He competed in two events at the 1976 Winter Olympics.
