= Juan Pablo Santiagos =

Chilean alpine skier (born 1968)

Personal information
- Nationality: Chilean
- Born: 3 October 1964 (age 60)

Sport
- Sport: Alpine skiing

Juan Pablo Santiagos (born 6 November 1968) is a Chilean alpine skier. He competed in four events at the 1988 Winter Olympics.
