= Rafael Cañas =

Chilean alpine skier (born 1953)

Personal information
- Nationality: Chilean
- Born: 5 November 1953 (age 72)

Sport
- Sport: Alpine skiing

Rafael Cañas (born 5 November 1953) is a Chilean alpine skier. He competed in three events at the 1976 Winter Olympics.
