= Andres Figueroa =

Chilean alpine skier (born 1963)

Personal information
- Born: 7 December 1963 (age 61) Santiago, Chile

Sport
- Sport: Alpine skiing

Andres Figueroa (born 7 December 1963) is a Chilean alpine skier. He competed in three events at the 1984 Winter Olympics.
