= Arturo Hammersley =

Chilean alpine skier (1922–2014)

Personal information
- Born: 21 May 1922 Valparaíso, Chile
- Died: 1 September 2014 (aged 92)

Sport
- Sport: Alpine skiing

Arturo Hammersley (21 May 1922 – 1 September 2014) was a Chilean alpine skier. He competed at the 1948 Winter Olympics and the 1956 Winter Olympics.
