= Jaime Errázuriz =

Chilean alpine skier (1923–2011)

Personal information
- Born: 3 August 1923; San Clemente, Chile
- Died: 15 January 2011 (aged 87)

Sport
- Sport: Alpine skiing

Jaime Errázuriz Zañartu (3 August 1923 – 15 January 2011) was a Chilean alpine skier. He competed at the 1948 Winter Olympics and the 1952 Winter Olympics.
