= Mikael Gayme =

Chilean alpine skier (born 1979)

Personal information
- Nationality: Chilean
- Born: 22 October 1979 (age 45); Caracas, Venezuela

Sport
- Sport: Alpine skiing

Mikael Gayme (born 22 October 1979) is a Chilean alpine skier. He competed at the 2002 Winter Olympics and the 2006 Winter Olympics.
