= Sergio Navarrete =

Chilean alpine skier (1925–2011)

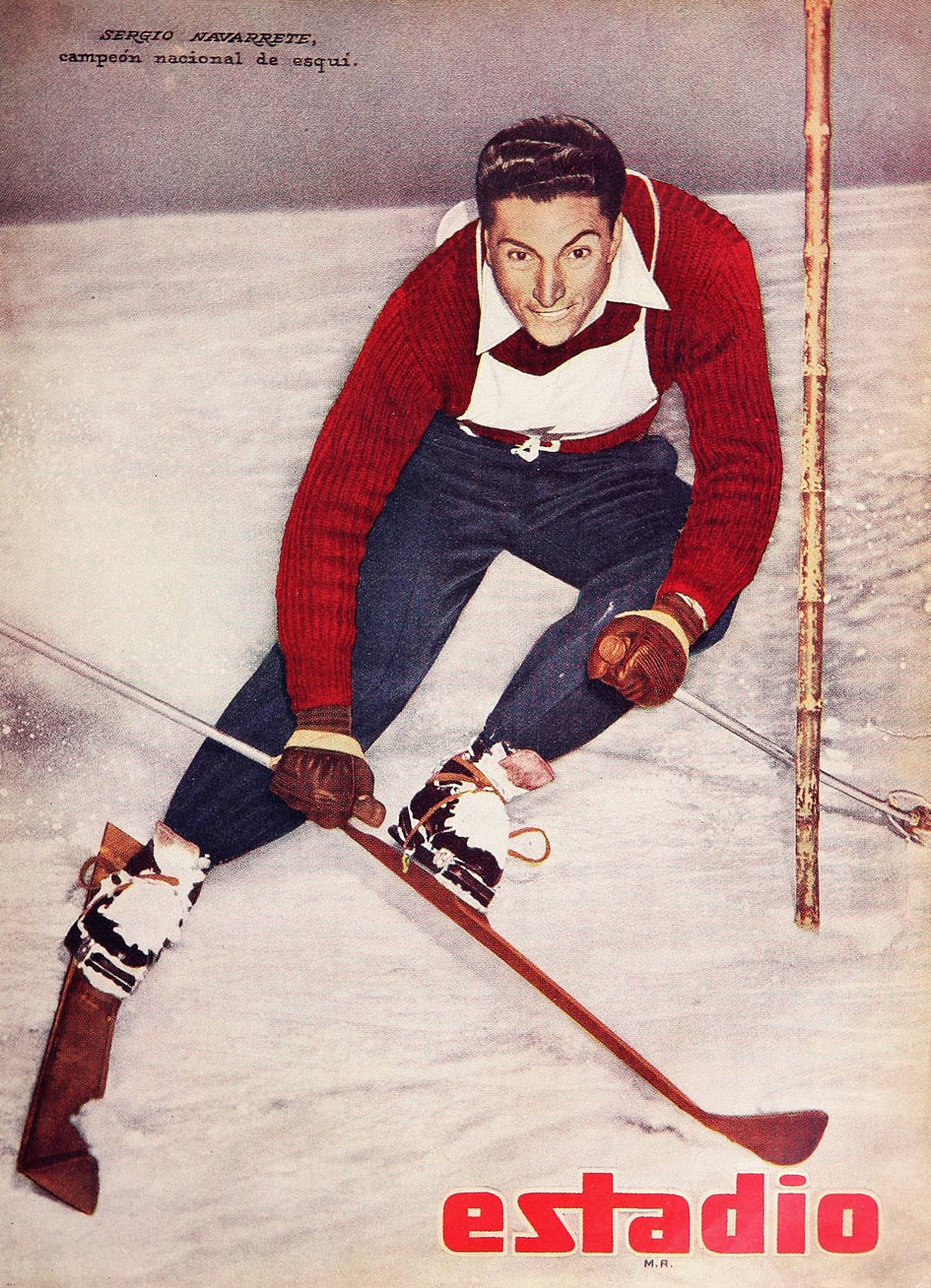

Personal information
- Born: 6 November 1925 Santiago, Chile
- Died: 1 July 2011 (aged 85)

Sport
- Sport: Alpine skiing

Sergio Navarrete (6 November 1925 – 1 July 2011) was a Chilean alpine skier. He competed at the 1952 Winter Olympics and the 1956 Winter Olympics.
