= Noelle Barahona =

Chilean alpine skier (born 1990)

Noelle Barahona (born 30 November 1990) is a Chilean alpine skier who competed in the 2006, 2010, 2014 and 2018 Winter Olympics. She is currently coached by Luciano Acerboni and skis for La Parva, a club in Santiago, Chile.

== Biography ==
Barahona was born in Santiago in 1990 to two athletic parents—her mother Yasmin was a Chilean windsurfing champion, while her father Pablo competed in sailing in the 1984 Summer Olympics. She attended International School Nido de Aguilas from Pre-K to 12th Grade. Barahona is a student of Universidad Católica in Santiago de Chile. She speaks Spanish, English, and Italian.

== Accomplishments ==
- Ranked Number 1 skier in Chile.
- Competed in the 2006 Winter Olympic Games in Turin, Italy. At 15 years old, Barahona was the youngest alpine skier ever to compete.
- Competed in the 2010 Winter Olympics in Vancouver, Canada. In her best race, Barahona placed 10th.
- Appeared on the American TV show "Larry King Live" to speak about the Chilean earthquake on Feb. 27, 2010.
- Competed in the 2014 Winter Olympics taking place in Sochi, Russia.
- Competed in the 2018 Winter Olympics taking place in Pyeongchang County, Korea.
