= Alexis Racloz =

Chilean alpine skier (born 1966)

Personal information
- Born: 9 September 1966 (age 59) Santiago, Chile

Sport
- Sport: Alpine skiing

Alexis Racloz (born 9 September 1966) is a Chilean alpine skier. He competed at the 1992 Winter Olympics and the 1994 Winter Olympics.
