= Dieter Linneberg =

Chilean alpine skier (born 1965)

Personal information
- Born: 4 August 1965 (age 61) Concepcion, Chile

Sport
- Sport: Alpine skiing

Dieter Linneberg (born 4 August 1965) is a Chilean alpine skier. He competed at the 1984 Winter Olympics and the 1988 Winter Olympics.
