= Mauricio Rotella =

Chilean alpine skier (born 1970)

Personal information
- Nationality: Chilean
- Born: 24 February 1970 (age 55)

Sport
- Sport: Alpine skiing

Mauricio Rotella (born 24 February 1970) is a Chilean alpine skier. He competed at the 1988 Winter Olympics and the 1992 Winter Olympics.
