= Dominique Ohaco =

Chilean freestyle skier (born 1995)

Personal information
- Born: Dominique Ohaco Gallyas; 19 December 1995 (age 30) Santiago, Chile

Sport
- Country: Chile
- Sport: Slopestyle

Dominique Ohaco Gallyas (born 19 December 1995 in Santiago, Chile) is a Chilean skier. She competed for Chile at the 2014 Winter Olympics in the premier of Women's slopestyle. She was selected to be Chile's flag bearer at the 2014 Winter Olympics.

She has represented Chile at 3 winter Olympics in 2014, 2018, and 2022.

Olympic Games
Preceded by Denisse Van Lamoen	Flagbearer for Chile; Sochi 2014	Succeeded by Érika Olivera
Preceded by Francisca Crovetto; Marco Grimalt	Flagbearer for Chile; Beijing 2022 with Henrik Von Appen	Succeeded by Antonia Abraham; Nicolas Jarry
