= Claudia Barrenechea =

Chilean biathlete (born 1977)

Personal information
- Nationality: Chilean
- Born: 1 June 1977 (age 47)

Sport
- Sport: Biathlon

Claudia Barrenechea (born 1 June 1977) is a Chilean biathlete. She competed in two events at the 2002 Winter Olympics.
