= Diego Margozzini =

Chilean alpine skier (born 1970)

Personal information
- Born: 15 April 1970 (age 55) Santiago, Chile

Sport
- Sport: Alpine skiing

Diego Margozzini (born 15 April 1970) is a Chilean alpine skier. He competed at the 1992 Winter Olympics and the 1994 Winter Olympics.
