= Mario Vera =

Chilean alpine skier (born 1940)

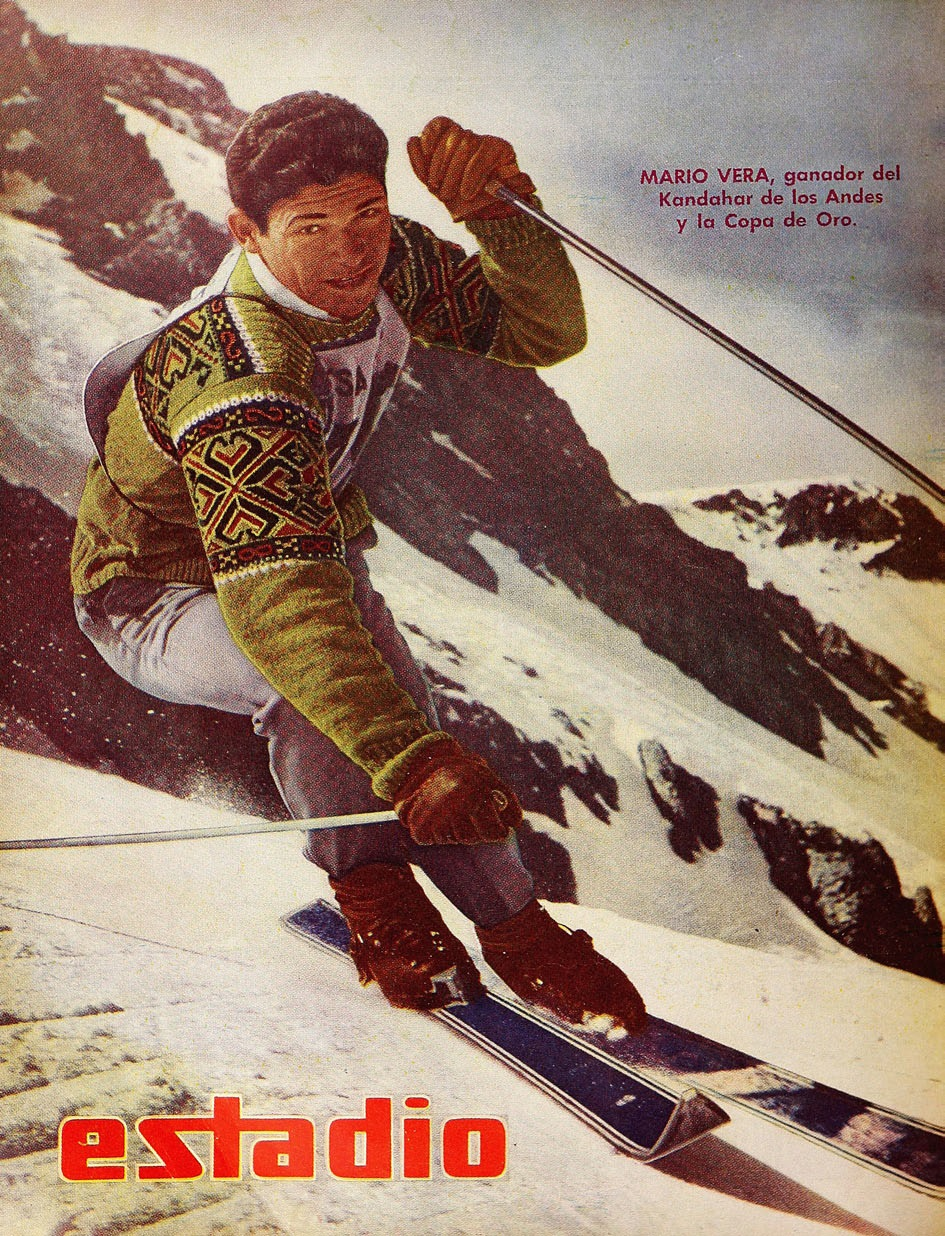

Personal information
- Born: 18 January 1940 (age 85) Santiago, Chile

Sport
- Sport: Alpine skiing

Mario Vera (born 18 January 1940) is a Chilean alpine skier. He competed at the 1960 Winter Olympics and the 1968 Winter Olympics.
