= Paulo Oppliger =

Chilean alpine skier (born 1971)

Paulo Oppliger (born 16 November 1971) is a Chilean former alpine skier who competed in the 1988 Winter Olympics and 1992 Winter Olympics.
