= Yonathan Fernández =

Chilean cross-country skier (born 1986)

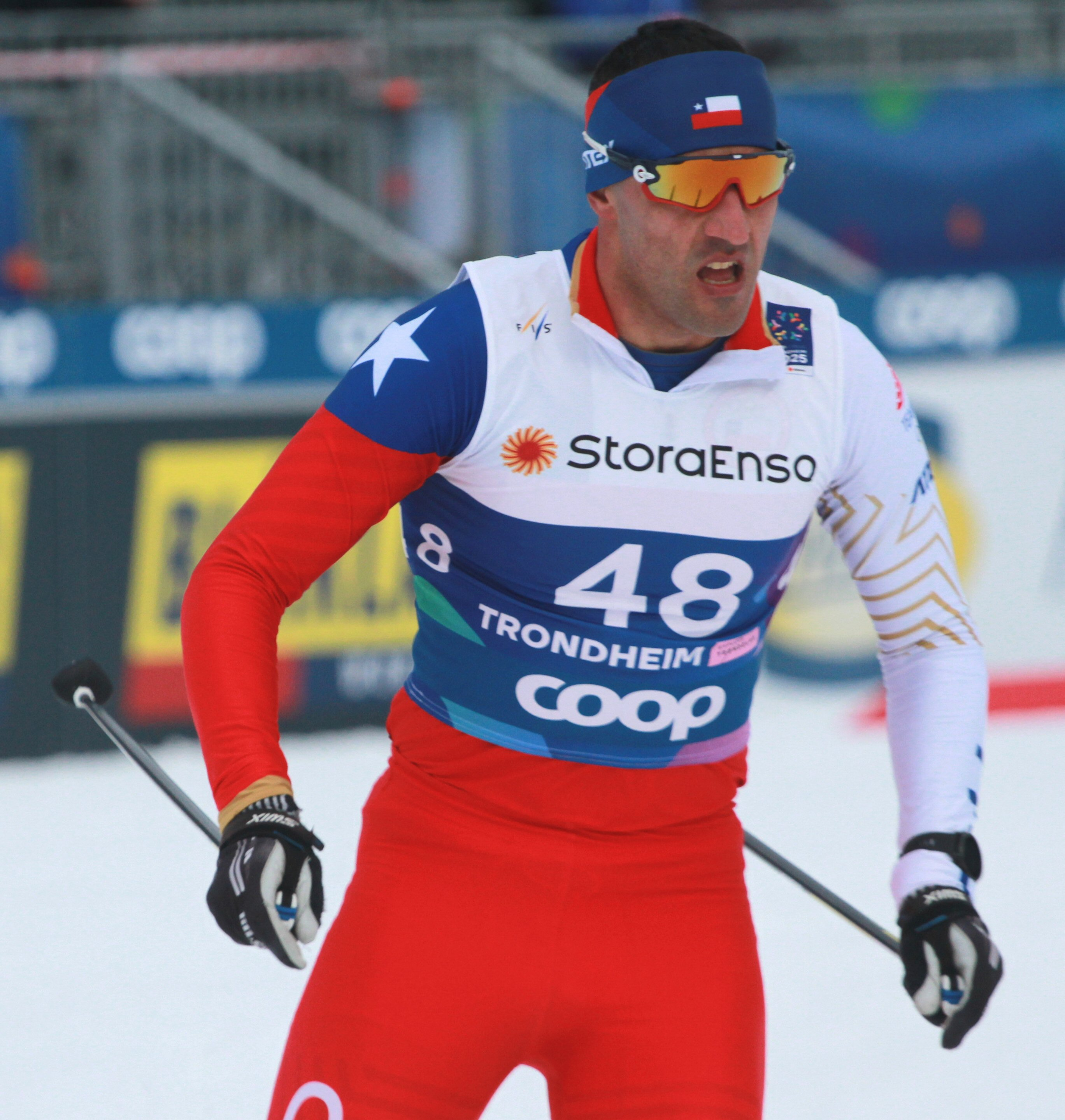
- Fernández at the men's Trondheim 2025 CC Qualification

Personal information
- Born: 14 April 1986 (age 40) Punta Arenas, Chile
Medal record
Cross-country skiing
Representing Chile

Yonathan Jesús Fernández García (Spanish pronunciation: [ˈɟʝonataŋ xeˈsus feɾˈnandes]; (Note: In isolation, Yonathan is pronounced [ˈɟʝonatan].) born 14 April 1986) is a cross-country skier from Chile. He competed for Chile at the 2014 Winter Olympics in the sprint event. He became the first cross country skier to compete for Chile at the Winter Olympics He carried Chile's flag during the closing ceremonies.

At the 2018 Winter Olympics in Pyeongchang, he finished 102nd in the Men's 15 km freestyle cross-country ski event. To prepare for the 2018 Olympics, he trained with Tongan skier Pita Taufatofua and Mexican skier Germán Madrazo in Austria.
