= Rainer Grob =

Chilean alpine skier (born 1973)

Personal information
- Born: 5 December 1973 (age 52) Osorno, Chile

Sport
- Sport: Alpine skiing

Achievements and titles
- Olympic finals: 1998 Winter Olympics

Rainer Grob (born 5 December 1973) is a Chilean alpine skier. He competed in two events at the 1998 Winter Olympics.
