= Duncan Grob =

Chilean alpine skier (born 1980)

Personal information
- Born: 18 August 1980 (age 46) Osorno, Chile

Sport
- Sport: Alpine skiing

Duncan Grob (born 18 August 1980) is a Chilean alpine skier. He competed at the 2002 Winter Olympics and the 2006 Winter Olympics.

Olympic Games
Preceded by Sebastián Keitel	Flagbearer for Chile; Nagano 1998	Succeeded by Nicolás Massú
