= Thomás Grob =

Chilean alpine skier (born 1977)

Personal information
- Born: 11 January 1977 (age 49) Santiago, Chile

Sport
- Sport: Alpine skiing

Thomás Grob (born 11 January 1977) is a Chilean alpine skier. He competed in three events at the 1998 Winter Olympics.
