= Henrik Von Appen =

Chilean alpine skier

Personal information
- Born: 15 December 1994 (age 31) Santiago, Chile
- Height: 1.86 m (6 ft 1 in)

Skiing career
- Sport: Alpine skiing
- Disciplines: Super-G, downhill
- World Cup debut: 30 November 2013 (age 18)

Olympics
- Teams: 2 (2014, 2018, 2022)

World Championships
- Teams: 4 – (2013–19)

World Cup
- Seasons: 6 – (2014–19)

Henrik Von Appen Piedrabuena (born 15 December 1994 in Santiago, Chile) is an alpine skier from Chile. He competed for Chile at the 2014 Winter Olympics and 2018 Winter Olympics in all five alpine skiing events. In 2018, Henrik was Chile's flagbearer at the opening ceremony.

His cousin Kai Horwitz is an Olympic alpine skier for Chile, and his cousin Nadja Horwitz is an Olympic sailor for Chile.

== World Cup results ==
=== Results per discipline ===
Discipline	WC starts	WC Top 30	WC Top 15	WC Top 5	WC Podium	Best result		
Discipline	WC starts	WC Top 30	WC Top 15	WC Top 5	WC Podium	Date	Location	Place
Slalom	0	0	0	0	0			
Giant slalom	0	0	0	0	0			
Super-G	42	3	1	0	0	4 December 2022	(United States) Beaver Creek, USA	14th
Downhill	51	5	0	0	0	17 January 2026	Wengen, Switzerland	16th
Combined	7	0	0	0	0	13 January 2017	Wengen, Switzerland	38th
Total	100	8	1	0	0			

- Standings through 24 January 2026

== World Championship results ==
Year
Year	Age	Slalom	Giant; Slalom	Super G	Downhill	Combined
2013	18	DNFQ1	67	—	—	—
2015	20	DNSQ1	DNF2	38	37	32
2017	22	—	—	29	32	31
2019	24			28	24	DNF1

== Olympic results ==
Year
Year	Age	Slalom	Giant; Slalom	Super G	Downhill	Combined
2014	19	—	DNF1	32	41	32
2018	23	—	—	30	34	DNS2
2022	27	—	—	27	32	DNF2

== Other results ==
=== European Cup results ===
==== Season standings ====
Season	Age	Overall	Slalom	Giant slalom	Super-G	Downhill	Combined
2017	22	124	—	—	70	37	54
2018	23	didn't score European cup point					
2019	24	135	—	—	49	44	—

==== Results per discipline ====
Discipline	EC starts	EC Top 30	EC Top 15	EC Top 5	EC Podium	Best result		
Discipline	EC starts	EC Top 30	EC Top 15	EC Top 5	EC Podium	Date	Location	Place
Slalom	0	0	0	0	0			
Giant slalom	0	0	0	0	0			
Super-G	9	2	0	0	0	20 December 2018	Zauchensee, Austria	23rd
Downhill	8	3	2	0	0	2 February 2017	Hinterstoder, Austria	9th
Combined	2	1	0	0	0	24 January 2017	Méribel, France	26th
Total	19	6	2	0	0			

- Standings through 15 February 2019

=== Nor-Am Cup results ===
==== Results per discipline ====
Discipline	NAC starts	NAC Top 30	NAC Top 15	NAC Top 5	NAC Podium	Best result		
Discipline	NAC starts	NAC Top 30	NAC Top 15	NAC Top 5	NAC Podium	Date	Location	Place
Slalom	0	0	0	0	0			
Giant slalom	0	0	0	0	0			
Super-G	2	0	0	0	0	14 December 2013	Copper Mountain, United States	64th
Downhill	2	0	0	0	0	11 December 2013	Copper Mountain, United States	67th
Combined	1	0	0	0	0	13 December 2013	Copper Mountain, United States	DNF
Total	5	0	0	0	0			

- Standings through 8 February 2019

=== South American Cup results ===
Von Appen started his first South American Cup race when he was 14 years and 234 days old on 8 August 2009.

==== Season standings ====
Season	Age	Overall	Slalom	Giant slalom	Super-G	Downhill	Combined
2011	16	20	—	14	21	17	—
2012	17	54	—	33	29	—	—
2013	18	23	21	9	20	25	—
2014	19	48	35	41	25	—	—
2015	20	5	10	39	5	7	3
2016	21	5	9	2	10	9	6
2017	22	6	8	7	8	11	14
2018	23	11	—	28	3	8	22
2019	24	10	—	57	7	14	—

==== Results per discipline ====
Discipline	SAC starts	SAC Top 30	SAC Top 15	SAC Top 5	SAC Podium	Best result		
Discipline	SAC starts	SAC Top 30	SAC Top 15	SAC Top 5	SAC Podium	Date	Location	Place
Slalom	24	14	9	1	0	12 August 2014	Cerro Catedral, Argentina	4th
Giant slalom	25	17	10	1	1	7 August 2015	Chapelco, Argentina	1st
Super-G	28	22	18	7	2	18 September 2014; 12 September 2018	El Colorado, Chile; El Colorado, Chile	3rd
Downhill	25	20	15	2	0	17 September 2014	El Colorado, Chile	4th
Combined	9	5	4	1	1	18 September 2014	El Colorado, Chile	3rd
Total	111	78	56	12	4			

- Standings through 20 September 2018

==== Race podiums ====
- 1 win – (1 GS)
- 4 podiums – (2 SG, 1 GS, 1 AC)

Season
Season	Date	Location	Discipline	Place
2015	18 September 2014	El Colorado, Chile	Super-G	3rd
2015	18 September 2014	El Colorado, Chile	Alpine combined	3rd
2016	7 August 2015	Chapelco, Argentina	Giant slalom	1st
2019	12 September 2018	El Colorado, Chile	Super-G	3rd

Olympic Games
Preceded by Érika Olivera	Flagbearer for Chile; Pyeongchang 2018	Succeeded by Francisca Crovetto; Marco Grimalt
Preceded by Francisca Crovetto; Marco Grimalt	Flagbearer for Chile; Beijing 2022 with Dominique Ohaco	Succeeded by Antonia Abraham; Nicolas Jarry
