= Nils Linneberg =

Chilean alpine skier (born 1967)

Personal information
- Born: 4 October 1967 (age 59) Santiago, Chile

Sport
- Sport: Alpine skiing

Nils Linneberg (born 4 October 1967) is a Chilean alpine skier. He competed at the 1988, 1992, 1994 and the 1998 Winter Olympics.
