= Chilean Olympic Committee =

National Olympic Committee

- Country: Chile
- Code: CHI
- Created: 1934
- Recognized: 1934
- Continental Association: PASO
- Headquarters: Santiago, Chile
- President: Miguel Ángel Mujica
- Secretary General: Jaime Agliati Valenzuela
- Website: coch.cl

The Chilean Olympic Committee (COCh; Spanish: Comité Olímpico de Chile; IOC Code: CHI) is a non-profit private organization composed of all Chilean sports federations who join it and accept its governance through statutes and regulations. It was created on 20 June 1934 and recognised the same year by the International Olympic Committee. The Committee is the organization in charge of coordinating Olympic activities in Chile. Before the COCh was formed, this duty was carried out by the “Liga Deportiva de Chile” (Chilean Sports League).

The motto of the COCh is the Latin phrase “Citius, Altius, Fortius”, meaning “Faster, Higher, Stronger”.

== COCh mission ==
The main goals of the Chilean Olympic Committee, as described in Title I, Article III of its statute are:

- Promote and protect Olympic principles, sports activities and sport education in Chile.
- Promote cultural and academic activities related with the Olympic culture, and in general promote physical activities and sports among Chilean population.
- Promote the respect of the Olympic rules and the Olympic Charter in Chile, and promote the Olympic cultures.
- Promote through the different sport federations the teaching of the different sports disciplines.
- Promote sport science and research related to sports; contribute to training teachers and other professionals related to sports activities.
- Fight all kinds of discrimination and violence in sports activities, as well as drugs and doping.
- Organize the participation of Chile in the Olympic Games, Pan-American Games, ODESUR, Pacific Games, and all other regional and international competitions.
- The exclusive representation of Chile in the International Olympic Committee.
- Promote sports and physical activities for disabled people in Chile, and coordinate the country’s participation in the Paralympic Games.
- Work to unify the efforts of government and non-governmental organizations to promote physical activity and sports, and remain independent of any political, religious or economic influence.

== Sports and activities supported by the Chilean Olympic committee ==
- Aeronautics
- Aero modelling
- Mountaineering
- Athletics
- Aikidō
- Auto racing
- Badminton
- Basketball
- Basque pelota
- Baseball
- Biathlon
- Bridge
- Billar (Fechillar)
- Bocce
- Bowling
- Boxing
- Canoeing
- Hunting and Fishing

- Cycling
- Diving
- Paralympic sports and activities
- Fencing
- Waterskiing
- Equitation
- Football and the Chilean Football Federation
- Full contact karate and Kick Boxing
- Gymnastics
- Golf
- Olympic weightlifting
- Handball and the Chilean Handball Federation
- Field Hockey
- Roller hockey (Quad)
- Judo
- Karate
- Kendō
- Wrestling

- Motor biking
- Swimming
- Sailing
- Parachuting
- Modern pentathlon
- Polo
- Chilean rodeo
- Rowing
- Rugby
- Skiing
- Squash
- Taekwondo
- Tennis and the Chilean Tennis Federation
- Table tennis
- Shooting sport
- Archery
- Triathlon
- Volleyball and the Chilean Volleyball Federation

== COCH board of directors ==
The board of the Chilean Olympic Committee in 2014 is as follows:

- President: Neven Ilic Alvarez
- Vice Chair: Miguel Angel Mujica Brain
- General Secretary: Jaime Agliati Valenzuela
- Treasurer: Veronica Rajii Krebs
- First Director: Carolina Sanz
- Second Director: Patricia Lopez
- Third Director: Rodrigo Moreno
- Fourth Director: Eduardo Valenzuela
- Fifth Director: Luis Alberto Santa Cruz

== See also ==
- Chile at the Olympics
- International Olympic Committee
- Sport in Chile
