= Iceland at the 1980 Summer Olympics =

- IOC code: ISL
- NOC: Olympic Committee of Iceland

in Moscow
- Competitors: 9 in 3 sports
- Flag bearer: Birgir Borgþórsson
- Medals: Gold 0 Silver 0 Bronze 0 Total 0

Summer Olympics appearances (overview)
- 1908; 1912; 1920–1932; 1936; 1948; 1952; 1956; 1960; 1964; 1968; 1972; 1976; 1980; 1984; 1988; 1992; 1996; 2000; 2004; 2008; 2012; 2016; 2020; 2024

Iceland competed at the 1980 Summer Olympics in Moscow, USSR.

== Results by event ==
=== Athletics ===
Key

- Note – Ranks given for track events are within the athlete's heat only
- Q = Qualified for the next round
- q = Qualified for the next round as a fastest loser or, in field events, by position without achieving the qualifying target
- NR = National record
- N/A = Round not applicable for the event
- Bye = Athlete not required to compete in round

Men
Track & road events

Athlete	Event	Heat		Quarterfinals		Semifinal		Final	
Athlete	Event	Result	Rank	Result	Rank	Result	Rank	Result	Rank
Oddur Sigurðsson	100 m	10.94	7	did not advance					
Oddur Sigurðsson	400 m	47.39	5	did not advance					
Jón Didriksson	800 m	1:51.1	6	—N/a		did not advance			
Jón Didriksson	1500 m	3:44.4	7	—N/a		did not advance			

Field events

Athlete	Event	Qualification		Final	
Athlete	Event	Distance	Position	Distance	Position
Hreinn Halldórsson	shot put	19.74	9	19.55	10
Óskar Jakobsson	shot put	19.66	11	19.07	11
Óskar Jakobsson	discus throw	NM		did not advance	

=== Judo ===
Men

Athlete	Event	Round of 32	Round of 16	Quarterfinals	Semifinals	Repechage 1	Repechage 2	Repechage 3	Final / BM	
Athlete	Event	Opposition Result	Opposition Result	Opposition Result	Opposition Result	Opposition Result	Opposition Result	Opposition Result	Opposition Result	Rank
Halldór Guðbjörnsson	71 kg	Diop (MLI); W	Alkśnin (POL); L	did not advance						
Bjarni Friðriksson	95 kg	Eyripidou (CYP); W	Dendeviin (MGL); W	Tornés (CUB); L	did not advance					

=== Weightlifting ===
Men

Athlete	Event	Snatch		Clean & Jerk		Total	Rank
Athlete	Event	Result	Rank	Result	Rank	Total	Rank
Þorsteinn Leifsson	82.5 kg	125		NM		DNF	
Guðmundur Helgason	90 kg	135		160		295	13
Birgir Borgþórsson	100 kg	147.5		182.5		330	12
