= Judo at the 1980 Summer Olympics – Men's 95 kg =

Judo competition

Men's 95kg at the Games of the XXII Olympiad
- Venue: Palace of Sports of the Central Lenin Stadium
- Date: July 27, 1980
- Competitors: 23 from 23 nations

Medalists
1st place, gold medalist(s)		Robert Van de Walle	Belgium
2nd place, silver medalist(s)		Tengiz Khubuluri	Soviet Union
3rd place, bronze medalist(s)		Dietmar Lorenz	East Germany
3rd place, bronze medalist(s)		Henk Numan	Netherlands

Men's 95 kg competition in Judo at the 1980 Summer Olympics in Moscow, Soviet Union was held at Palace of Sports of the Central Lenin Stadium. The gold medal was won by Robert Van de Walle from Belgium.

== Results ==
=== Pool A ===
Round of 32
Dietmar Lorenz (GDR)	0:58
Elias Kobti (SYR)	E
Robert Köstenberger (AUT)
Bye
Tengiz Khubuluri (URS)	5:00
Dariusz Nowakowski (POL)	R
Daniel Radu (ROM)
Bye
Rajko Kušić (YUG)	0:31
Alassane Thioub (SEN)	E
Rolando José Tornés (CUB)
Bye
Bjarni Friðriksson (ISL)	1:25
Panikos Eyripidou (CYP)	E
Dendeviin Amgaa (MGL)
Bye

Round of 16
Dietmar Lorenz (GDR)	5:00
Robert Köstenberger (AUT)	R
Tengiz Khubuluri (URS)	5:00
Daniel Radu (ROM)	R
Rolando José Tornés (CUB)	1:16
Rajko Kušić (YUG)	E
Bjarni Friðriksson (ISL)	3:32
Dendeviin Amgaa (MGL)	E

Quarterfinal
Tengiz Khubuluri (URS)	5:00
Dietmar Lorenz (GDR)	R
Rolando José Tornés (CUB)	5:00
Bjarni Friðriksson (ISL)	E

Semifinal
Tengiz Khubuluri (URS)	5:00
Rolando José Tornés (CUB)	R

=== Pool B ===
Round of 32
Robert Van de Walle (BEL)	5:00
István Szepesi (HUN)	R
Rex Chizooma (ZAM)
Bye
Luiz Moura (BRA)	0:19
Tsancho Atanasov (BUL)	E
Jean-Luc Rougé (FRA)
Bye
Mark Chittenden (GBR)	0:12
Jaroslav Nikodým (TCH)	E
John de Wet (ZIM)
Bye
Henk Numan (NED)
Bye
Essambo Ewane (CMR)
Bye

Round of 16
Robert Van de Walle (BEL)	0:56
Rex Chizooma (ZAM)	R
Jean-Luc Rougé (FRA)	5:00
Luiz Moura (BRA)	E
Mark Chittenden (GBR)	5:00
John de Wet (ZIM)	E
Henk Numan (NED)	5:00
Essambo Ewane (CMR)	E

Quarterfinal
Robert Van de Walle (BEL)	5:00
Jean-Luc Rougé (FRA)	R
Henk Numan (NED)	5:00
Mark Chittenden (GBR)	E

Semifinal
Robert Van de Walle (BEL)	2:17
Henk Numan (NED)	R

=== Repechages ===
Repechage		Repechage semifinal		Repechage final
Daniel Radu (ROM)	2:49
Dariusz Nowakowski (POL)	E	Dietmar Lorenz (GDR)	1:18
		Daniel Radu (ROM)	E
				Dietmar Lorenz (GDR)	0:11 (bronze)
				Rolando José Tornés (CUB)

Repechage		Repechage semifinal		Repechage final
István Szepesi (HUN)	2:46
Rex Chizooma (ZAM)	E	István Szepesi (HUN)	5:00
		Jean-Luc Rougé (FRA)	E
				Henk Numan (NED)	7:00 (bronze)
				István Szepesi (HUN)

=== Final ===
Final
Robert Van de Walle (BEL)	7:00 (gold)
Tengiz Khubuluri (URS)	2nd place, silver medalist(s)
