= Dominikus Zimmermann =

German architect (1685–1766)

- Born: 30 June 1685; Gaispoint, Electorate of Bavaria, Holy Roman Empire
- Died: 16 November 1766 (aged 81); Wies, Styria, Habsburg monarchy
- Occupations: Architect, stuccoist

Dominikus Zimmermann (30 June 1685, Gaispoint – 16 November 1766, Wies) was a German Rococo architect and stuccoist.

== Life ==
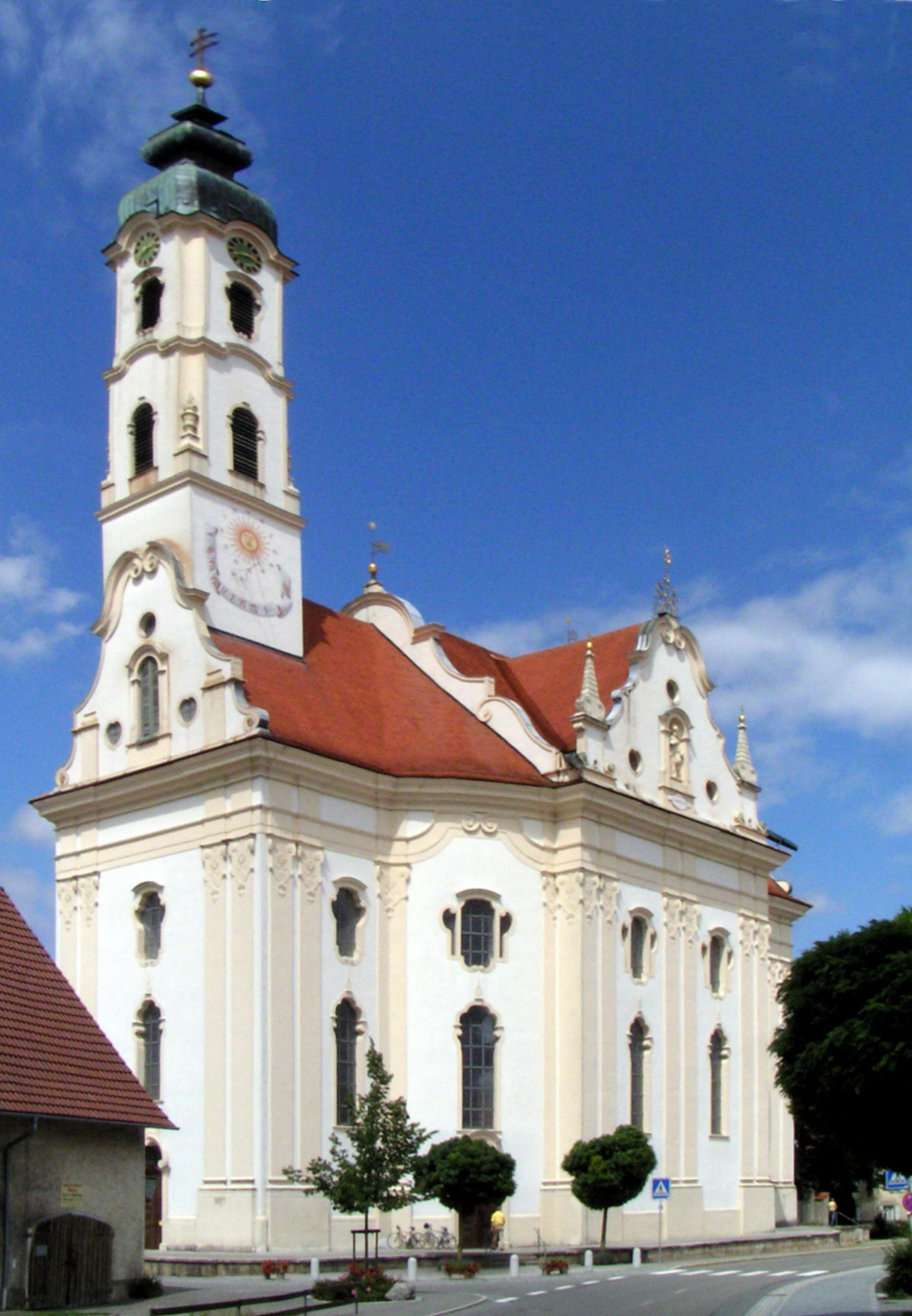
Pilgrimage Church in Steinhausen (1728–31)

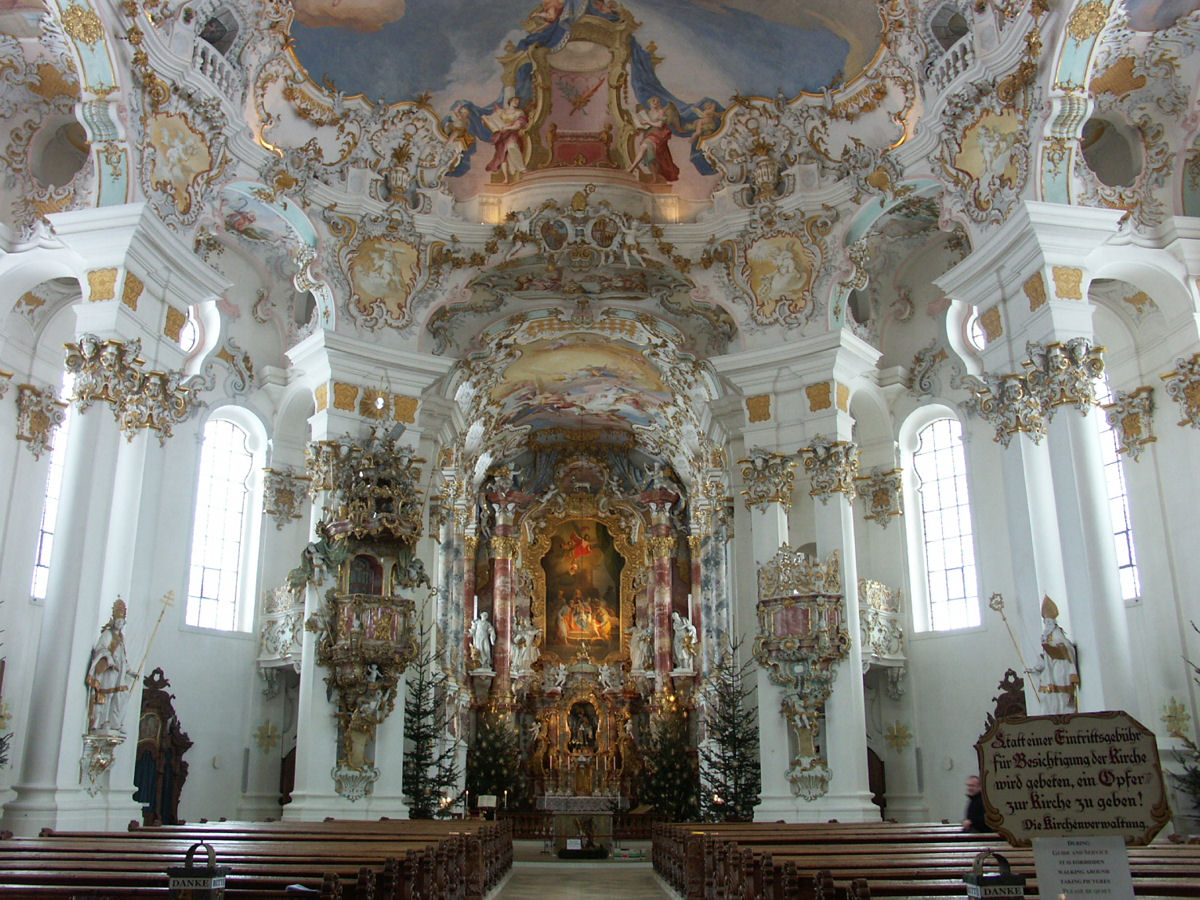
Interior of Wies Church, Steingaden, Germany (1745–54)

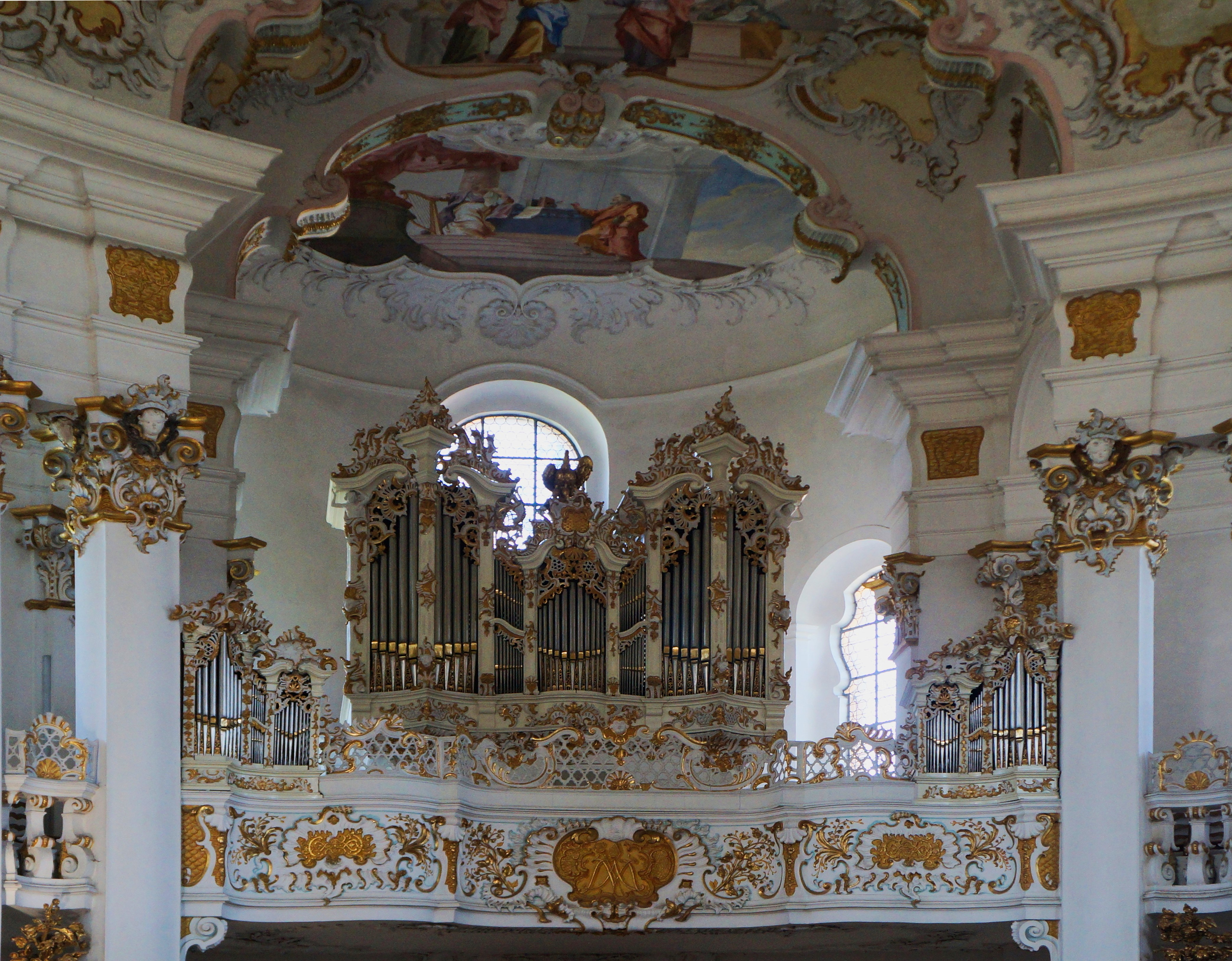
Wieskirche.- Pipe organs

Dominikus Zimmermann was born in Gaispoint near Wessobrunn in 1685 and became a Baumeister (Architect) and a stuccoist. His older brother Johann Baptist Zimmermann was an architect and a frescoist. Working together they produced masterpieces such as the church at Steinhausen. Dominikus Zimmermann descended from a family of artists and craftsmen belonging to the so-called Wessobrunner School, and worked first as a stuccoist and later as a master builder and architect. He lived in Landsberg am Lech, where he was mayor between 1748–53. He died near the pilgrims' church in Wies near Steingaden in 1766.

== Principal works ==
- Abbey Church, Mödingen (1716–1725) in the district of Dillingen
- Old Town Hall (1719) and St John's Church (1752) in Landsberg am Lech
- Pilgrimage Church in Steinhausen near Bad Schussenried (1728–1733)
- Church of Our Lady in Günzburg (1735–1740)
- Pilgrimage church in Wies near Steingaden (1745–54)
