= Johann Baptist Zimmermann =

German painter (1680–1758)

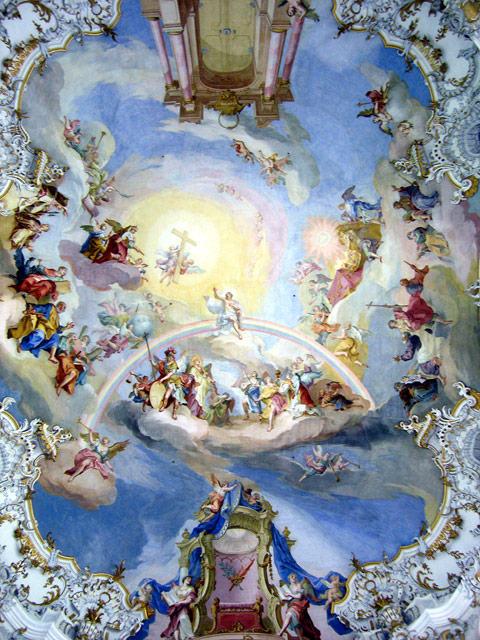
Ceiling fresco in the Wies Church

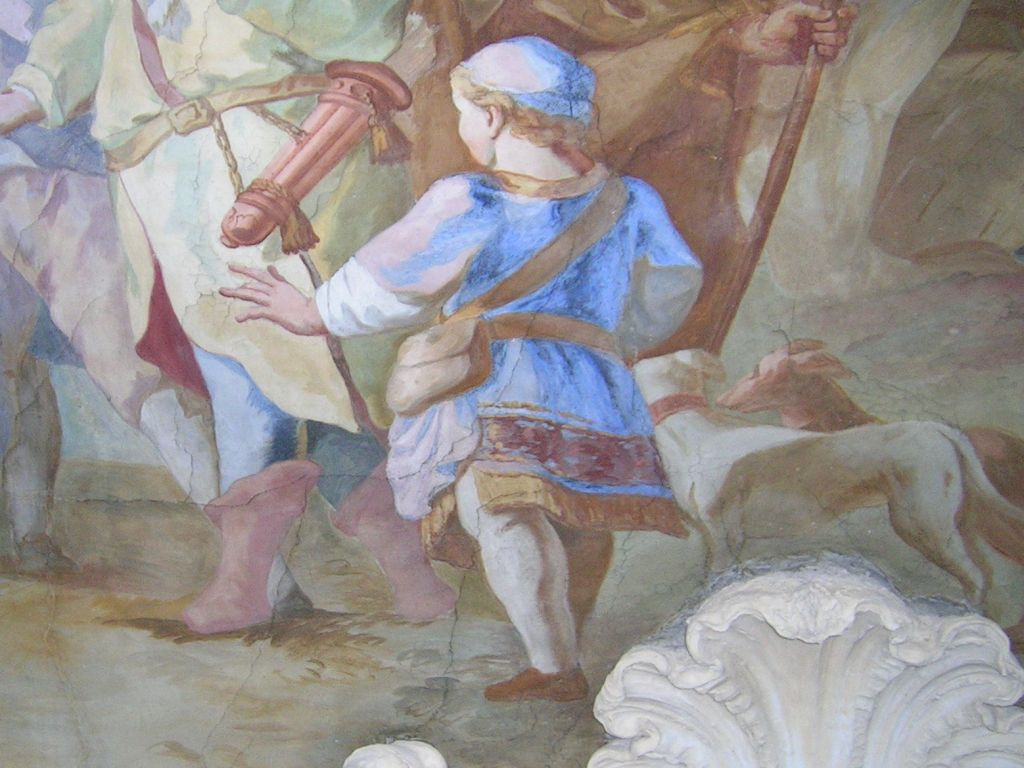
Detail of the fresco in St. Michael Berg am Laim

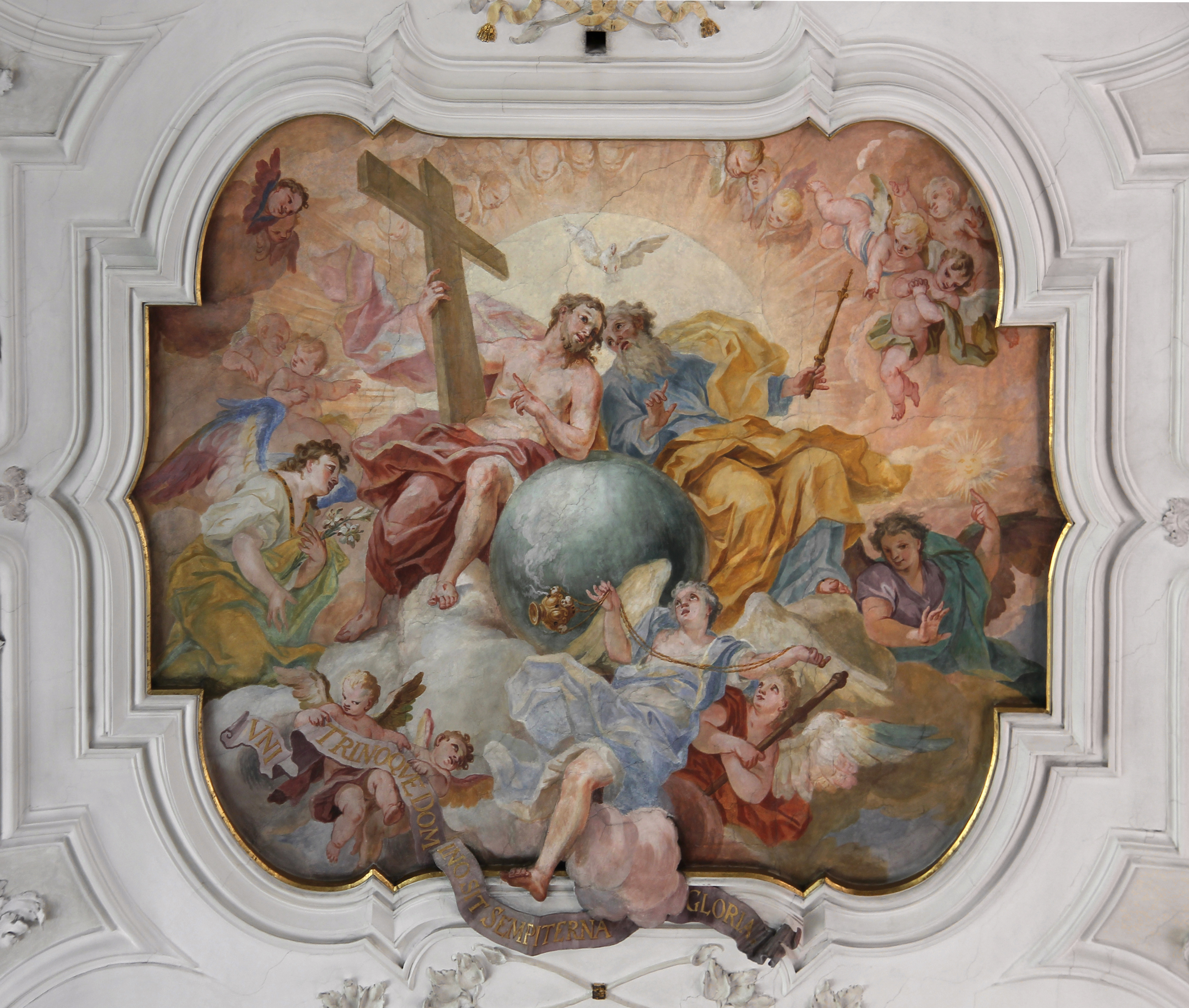
Holy Trinity, Klosterkirche Wörishofen

Johann Baptist Zimmermann (3 January 1680, Gaispoint – 2 March 1758, Munich) was a German painter and a prime stucco plasterer during the Baroque.

Zimmermann was born in Gaispoint, Wessobrunn. He and his brother Dominikus Zimmermann were descended from an artist family of the Wessobrunner School.

== Work ==
- 1701 stucco and fresco for the church Mariä Empfängnis of Gosseltshausen
- 1707 stucco and fresco for the church Maria Schnee in Markt Rettenbach
- Before 1710 and 1728: Stucco for the Tegernsee Abbey
- 1709/1710: Design for the church St. Johannes in Neuburg an der Kammel-Edelstetten
- 1709/1710–1713/1727 (cooperation with his brother): Fresco of Marienkapelle and stucco and fresco for the library of Reichskartause in Buxheim (Allgäu)
- 1711–1713: stucco and fresco for the Klosterkirche Maria Saal
- 1714: stucco and fresco of Pfarrkirche St. Sixtus von Schliersee
- 1714–1722: Stucco for the Ottobeuren Abbey
- ca 1715 stucco and fresco for rooms of Maxlrain castle
- (since) 1716 stucco and fresco for the Benediktuskirche in Freising
- 1717: stucco and fresco in the chapel and the dining room of Ismaning palace
- 1718–1722 (cooperation with his brother): decoration of the church Mariä Himmelfahrt in Maria Medingen
- 1720–1726: Stucco for the Grand Stairway of Schleissheim Palace under Joseph Effner
- 1720-1726/1727: Stucco for the Sommerzimmer and the Spiegelsaal of the first northern Pavillon of Nymphenburg Palace
- 1722/1723 (cooperation with his brother): Decoration of St. Mary in Bad Wörishofen
- 1724 and 1731–1733: stucco and fresco for Benediktbeuern Abbey
- 1725/1726–1727/1729: Design and stucco of St. Peter and Paul in Buxheim (Allgäu)
- 1725/1727–1728/1733 (cooperation with his brother): Decoration of St. Markus in Sießen/Saulgau
- 1726–1733: stucco for the Residenz, Munich
- 1727–1733: Decoration of St. Peter and Paul in Steinhausen
- 1727/1730–1731/1733 (cooperation with his brother): Fresco of the church in Steinhausen
- 1729: stucco and fresco of St. Peter and Paul in Weyarn
- 1729/1741-1741/1748: stucco and fresco of Mariä Himmelfahrt church in Dietramszell
- 1730 stucco and fresco of the church of Beyharting
- 1730–1739: Stucco in the Reiche Zimmern of the Residenz, Munich
- 1732: Fresco of Neumünster church in Würzburg
- 1733/34: Decoration of the monastery Seligenthal in Landshut
- 1733/1754–1756/1760: stucco and fresco of St. Dionys and Juliana in Schäftlarn Abbey
- 1734-1737/1739: stucco of the Amalienburg in Munich-Nymphenburg
- 1735/1738–1740: Design of the Mariä Himmelfahrt in Prien am Chiemsee
- 1737/1743–1744/1752: stucco and fresco of St. Michael in Berg am Laim
- 1738: House Kern in Wasserburg am Inn
- 1745–1752: Design and stucco of Ettal Abbey
- 1747/1749–1752: baroque renovation of St. Blasius in Landshut
- 1748/1752–1752/1754: stucco and fresco of the church "Maria Brünnlein zum Trost" in Wemding
- 1749 and 1753–1754: fresco in the Wieskirche

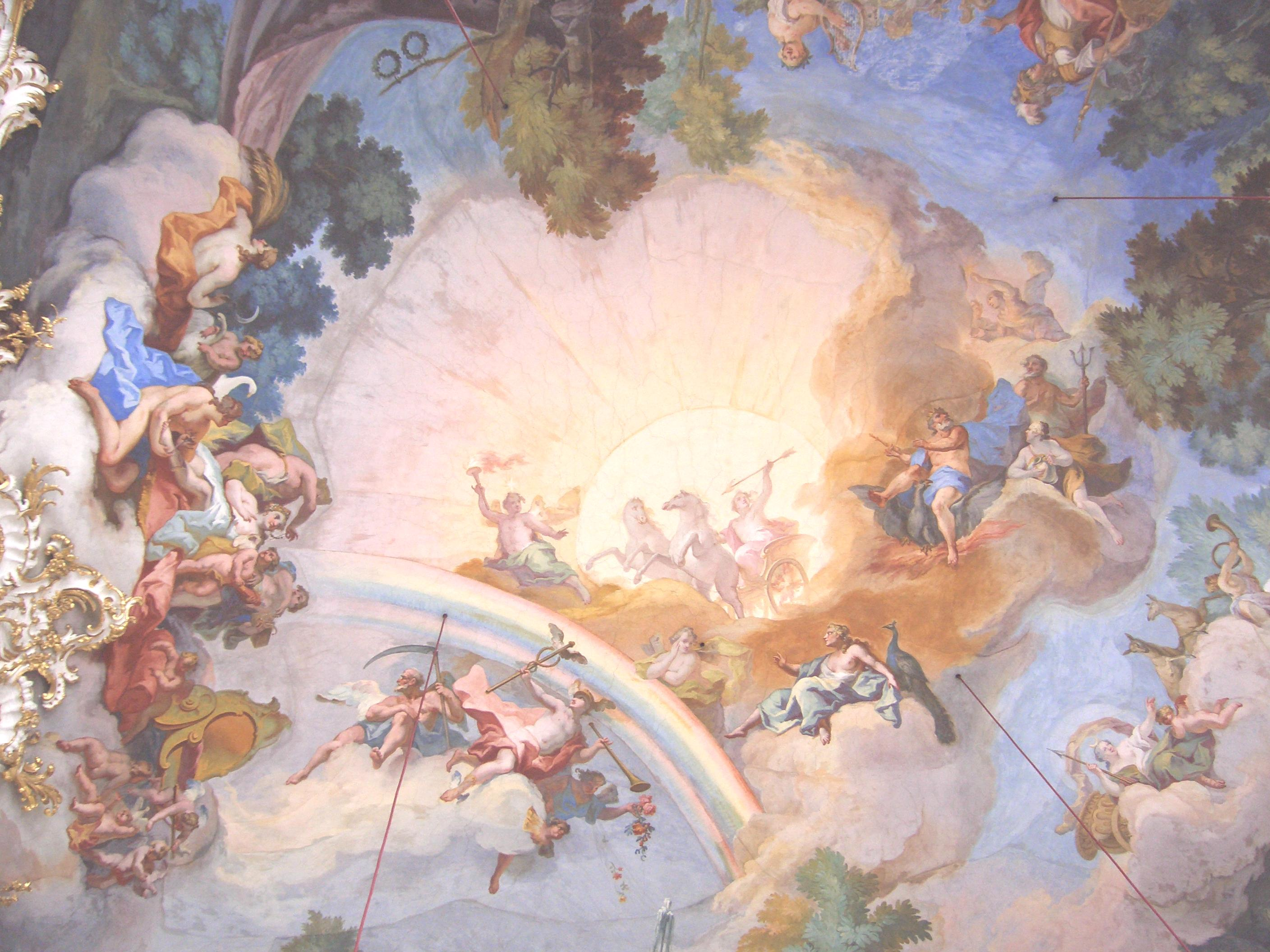
Fresco in Nymphenburg Palace

- 1751–1752/1754: stucco and fresco in Andechs Abbey St. Nikolaus and St. Elisabeth
- 1751–1761: baroque renovation of the church St. Anna in München-Harlaching
- 1753/1754: stucco and fresco in St. Peter in Munich
- 1755/56–1757: stucco and fresco of the Steinerner Saal in Nymphenburg Palace in Munich
- 1756: Fresco of Prämonstratenserklosterkirche in Neustift
- 1757: Decoration of Pfarrkirche St. Vitus in Abensberg-Offenstetten
