= Thioub =

Thioub is a surname. Notable people with the surname include:

- Alassane Thioub (born 1955), Senegalese judoka
- Sada Thioub (born 1995), French footballer
- Thierno Thioub (born 1998), Senegalese footballer
