= Rajko Kušić =

Yugoslav judoka (born 1955)

Personal information
- Nationality: Yugoslav
- Born: 21 June 1955
- Died: 2 September 1994 (aged 39)
- Occupation: Judoka

Sport
- Sport: Judo

Rajko Kušić (21 June 1955 – 2 September 1994) was a Yugoslav judoka. He competed in the men's half-heavyweight event at the 1980 Summer Olympics.
