= Henk Numan =

Dutch judoka (1955–2018)

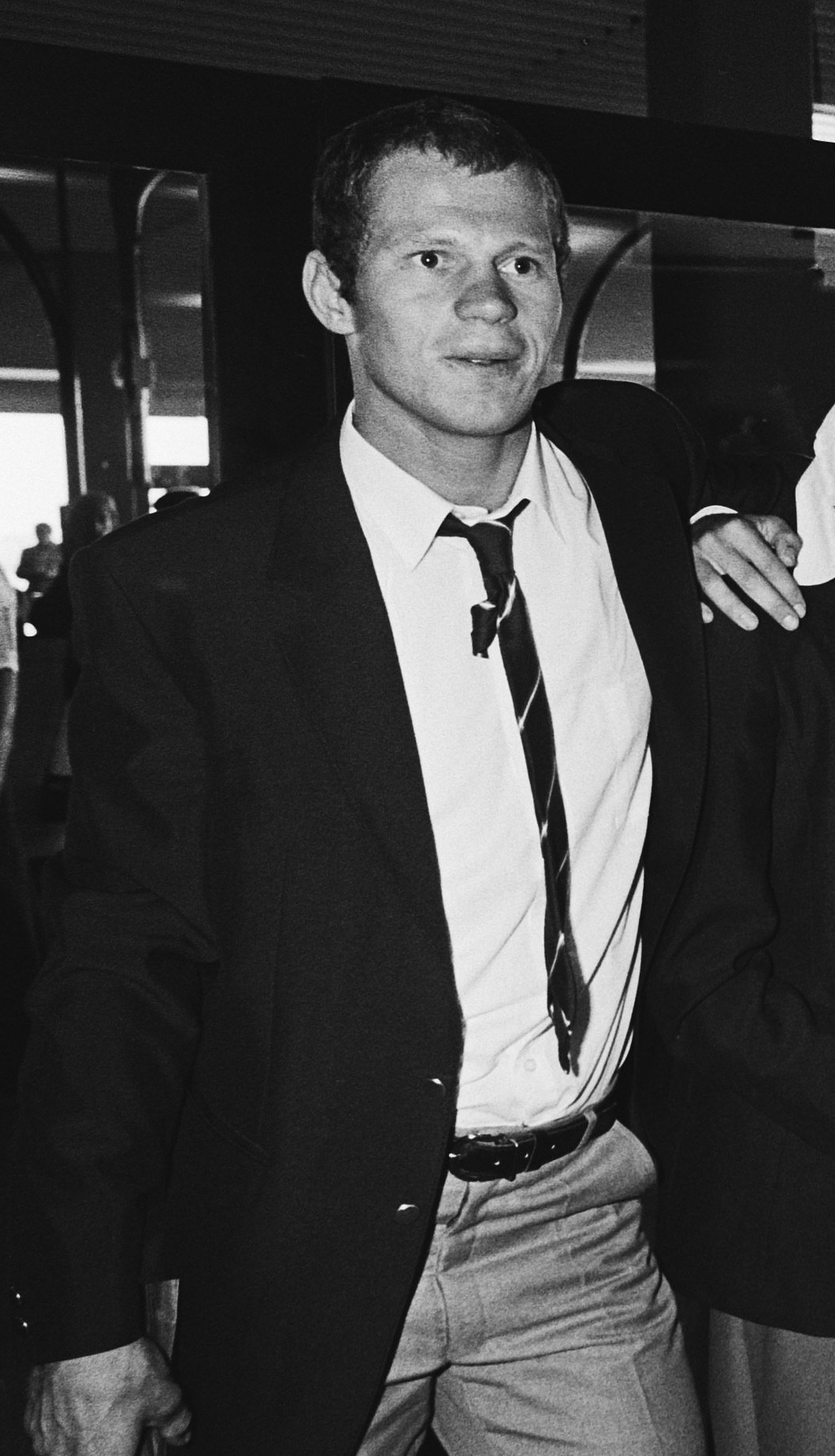
- Numan in 1980

Personal information
- Full name: Hendrik Numan
- Born: 13 June 1955 Amsterdam, the Netherlands
- Died: 26 April 2018 (aged 62) Landsmeer, the Netherlands
- Occupation: Judoka
- Height: 1.87 m (6 ft 2 in)

Sport
- Country: Netherlands
- Sport: Judo
- Weight class: ‍–‍95 kg

Achievements and titles
- Olympic Games: (bronze) (1980)
- World Champ.: (bronze) (1979)
- European Champ.: 5th (1982)
Medal record
Men's judo
Representing the Netherlands
Olympic Games
Bronze medal – third place	1980 Moscow	‍–‍95 kg
World Championships
Bronze medal – third place	1979 Paris	‍–‍95 kg
European Junior Championships
Bronze medal – third place	1974 Tel Aviv	‍–‍93 kg

Profile at external databases
- IJF: 54304
- JudoInside.com: 4375
- Updated on 20 June 2023

Hendrik "Henk" Numan (13 June 1955 – 26 April 2018) was a judoka from the Netherlands, who won a bronze medal in half-heavyweight division (‍–‍95 kg) at the 1980 Summer Olympics in Moscow. His only loss at that tournament was against the later champion Robert Van De Walle from Belgium. A year earlier, Numan won a bronze medal at the 1979 World Judo Championships. In 1992, he also competed in Japanese professional wrestling for Fighting Network RINGS as a part of Chris Dolman's team.

Numan died at the age of 62 on 26 April 2018. No cause of death was publicly released. However, in an interview with Dutch wrestling coach Bert Kops jr., published a few weeks later, it was revealed that Numan had committed suicide.
