= Wieskirche =

Pilgrimage Church of Wies
UNESCO World Heritage Site
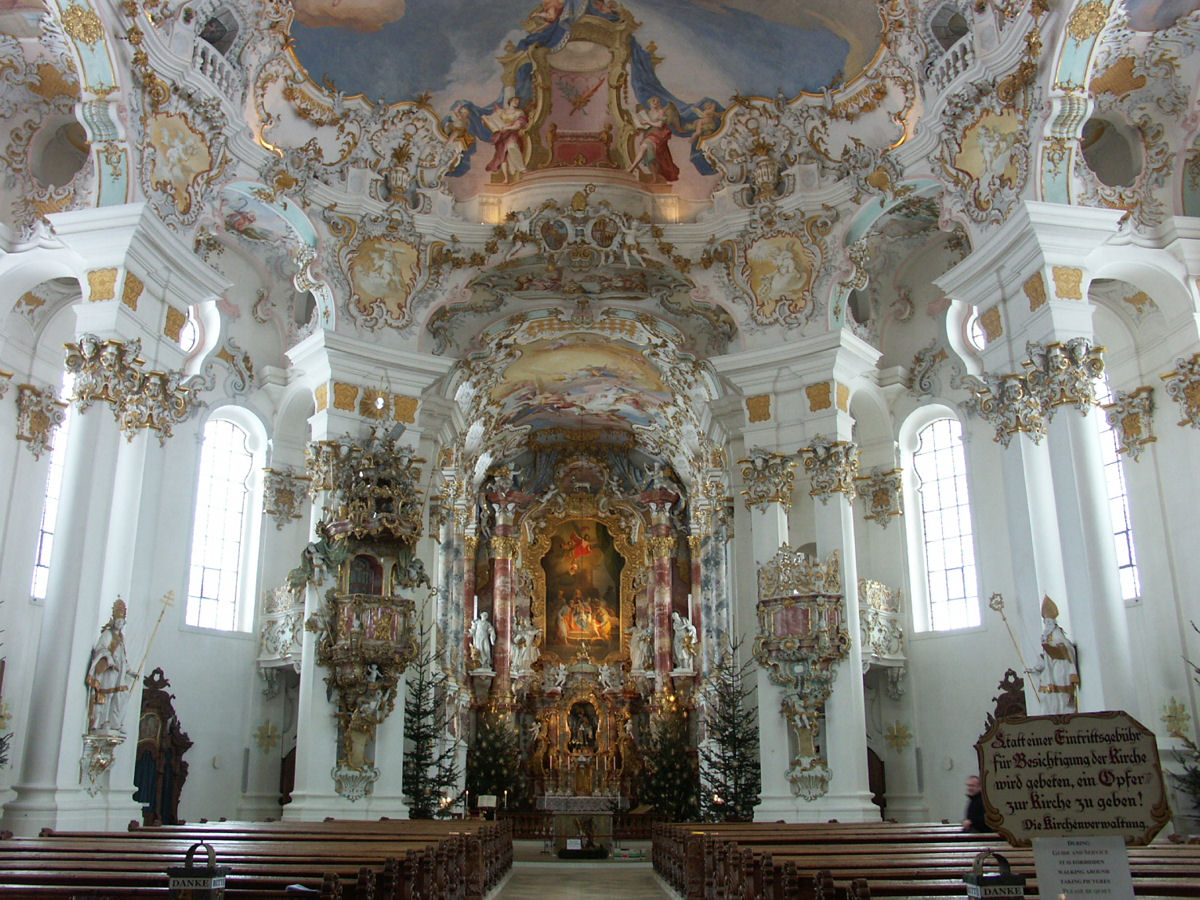

- Location within Germany Location within Bavaria
- Location: Steingaden, Weilheim-Schongau district, Bavaria, Germany
- Criteria: Cultural: i, iii
- Reference: 271
- Inscription: 1983 (7th Session)
- Area: 0.1 ha (0.25 acres)
- Buffer zone: 8.4 ha (21 acres)
- Coordinates: 47°40′52″N 10°54′0″E

The Pilgrimage Church of Wies (officially: Wallfahrtskirche zum Gegeißelten Heiland auf der Wies ("Pilgrimage Church of the Scourged Savior on the Meadow"); abbr. Wieskirche ("Meadow Church")) is a Roman Catholic oval Rococo church, designed in the late 1740s and completed in 1754. It is the major work of the brothers Johann Baptist and Dominikus Zimmermann, the latter of whom lived nearby for the last eleven years of his life. It is located in the foothills of the Alps, in the municipality of Steingaden, Germany. It belongs to the diocese of Augsburg (deanery of Weilheim-Schongau), and is dedicated to Saint Joseph. Because of its outstanding Rococo architecture, the Wieskirche was added to the UNESCO World Heritage List in 1983.

== Geography and traffic ==
The Wieskirche is located in the tiny village of Wies ("Meadow"), which lies southeast of Steingaden, the municipality it belongs to. The church lies in the foreland of the Ammergau Alps, that separate Bavaria from Tyrol in Austria to the south. Steingaden belongs to the district of Weilheim-Schongau in Upper Bavaria. The closest railway stations are Bad Kohlgrub-Kurhaus and Saulgrub on the Ammergau Railway, linking Murnau am Staffelsee and Oberammergau. The nearest motorway exit is Murnau am Staffelsee / Kochel am See of the Federal Motorway 95. During summer weekends, there is a direct bus service between the Wieskirche and Munich-Pasing railway station (DAV BergBus (line 996)).

== History and description ==
It is said that, in 1738, tears were seen on a dilapidated wooden figure of the Scourged Saviour. The legend of this miracle resulted in a pilgrimage rush to see the sculpture. In 1740, a small chapel was built to house the statue but it was soon realized that the building would be too small for the number of pilgrims it attracted, and so Steingaden Abbey decided to commission a separate shrine. Construction took place between 1745 and 1754, and the interior was decorated with frescoes and with stuccowork in the tradition of the Wessobrunner School. "Everything was done throughout the church to make the supernatural visible. Sculpture and murals combined to unleash the divine in visible form".

There is a popular belief that the Bavarian government planned to sell or demolish the rococo masterpiece during the secularization of Bavaria at the beginning of the 19th century, and that only protests from the local farmers saved it from destruction. Available sources, however, document that the responsible state commission clearly advocated the continuation of Wies as a pilgrimage site, even in spite of economic objections from the abbot of Steingaden. Many who have prayed in front of the statue of Jesus on the altar have claimed that people have been miraculously cured of their diseases, which has made this church even more of a pilgrimage site. The church underwent extensive restoration between 1985 and 1991.

The Wieskirche has an oval plan, with a semi-circular narthex. Inside, twin columns in front of the walls support the elaborate cornice, with elaborate stucco decorations (painted by J. B. Zimmermann) and a long, deep choir. The ceilings are painted in a trompe-l'œil style, appearing to open up to an iridescent sky.

== Gallery ==
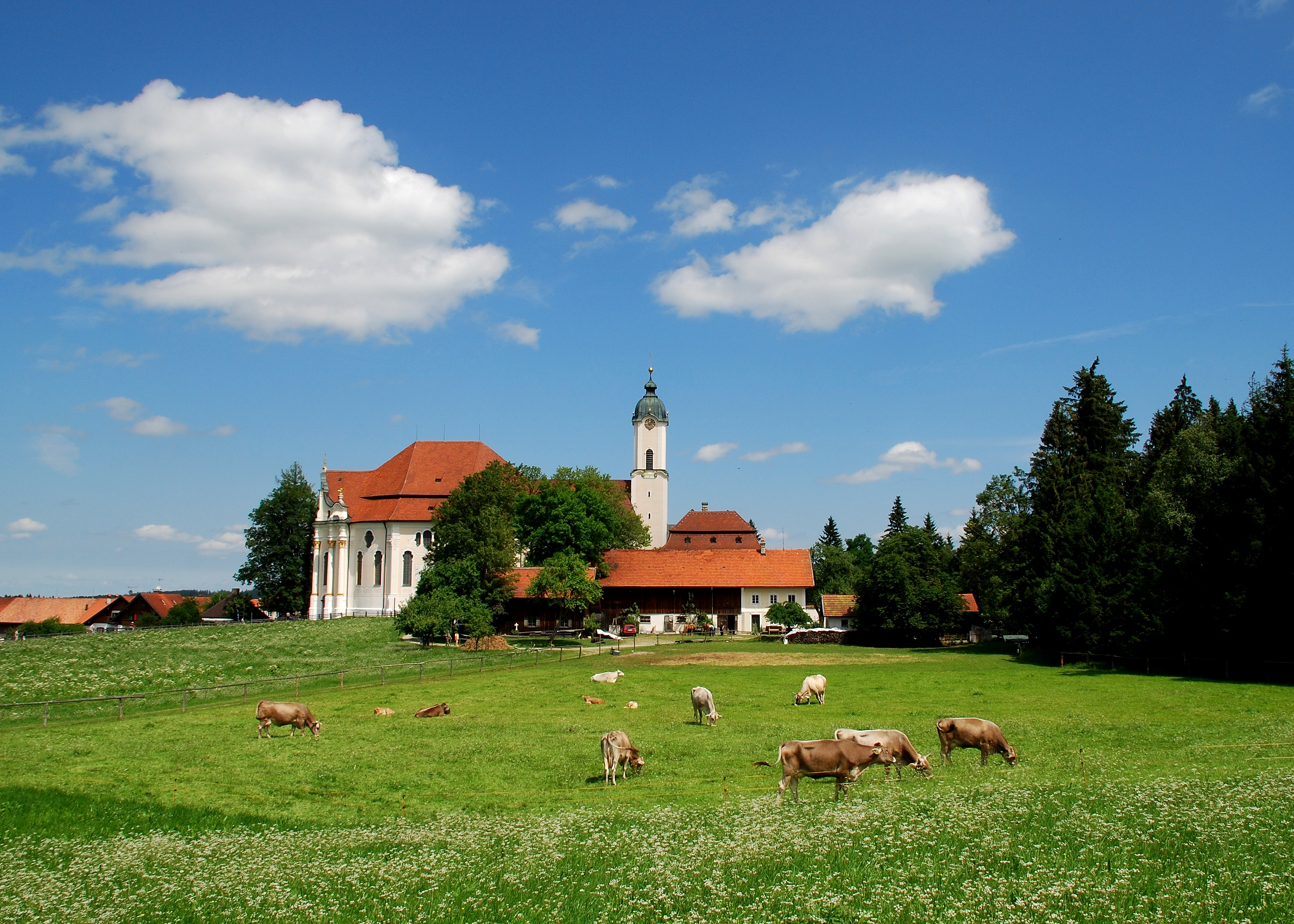

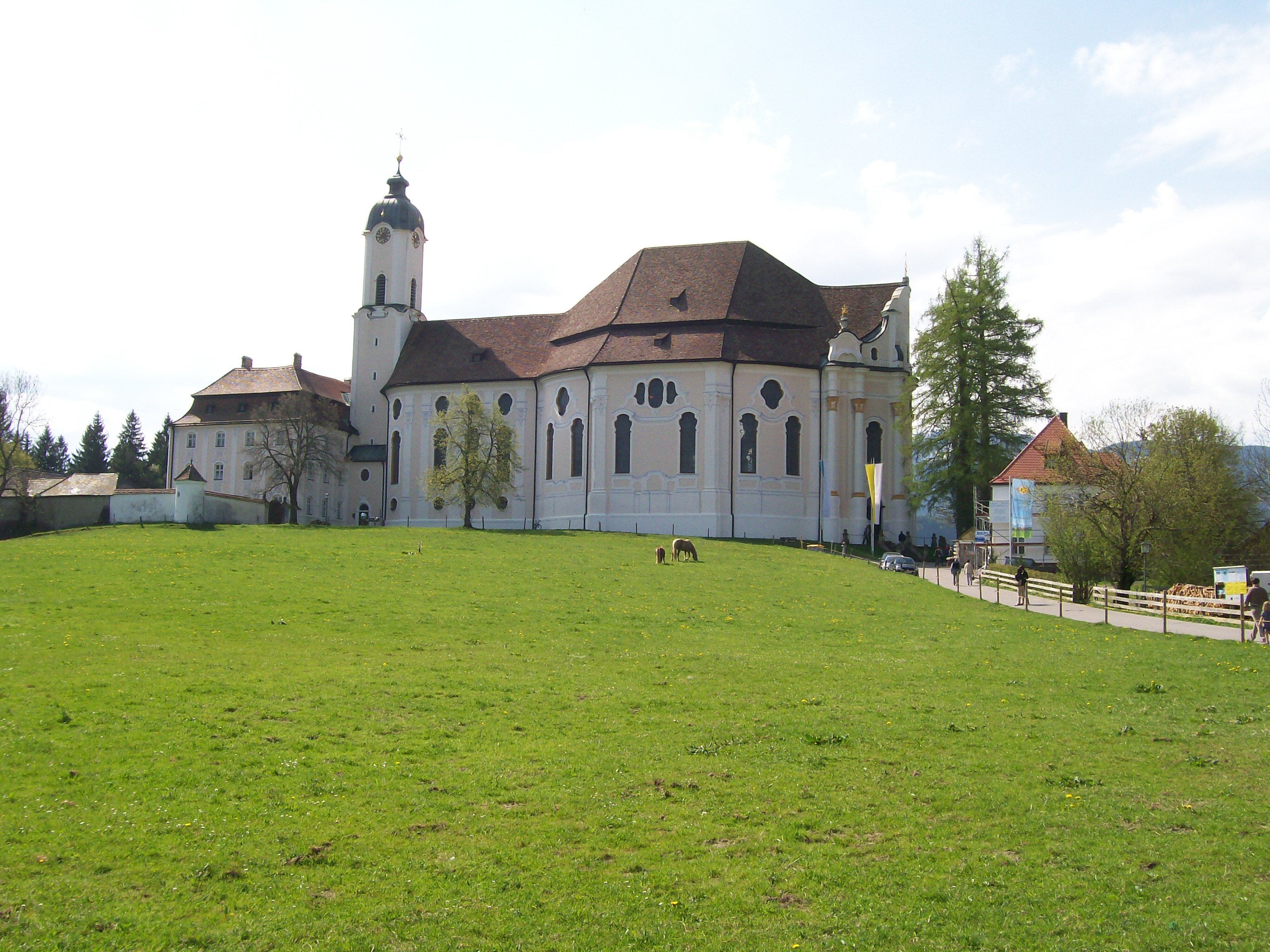

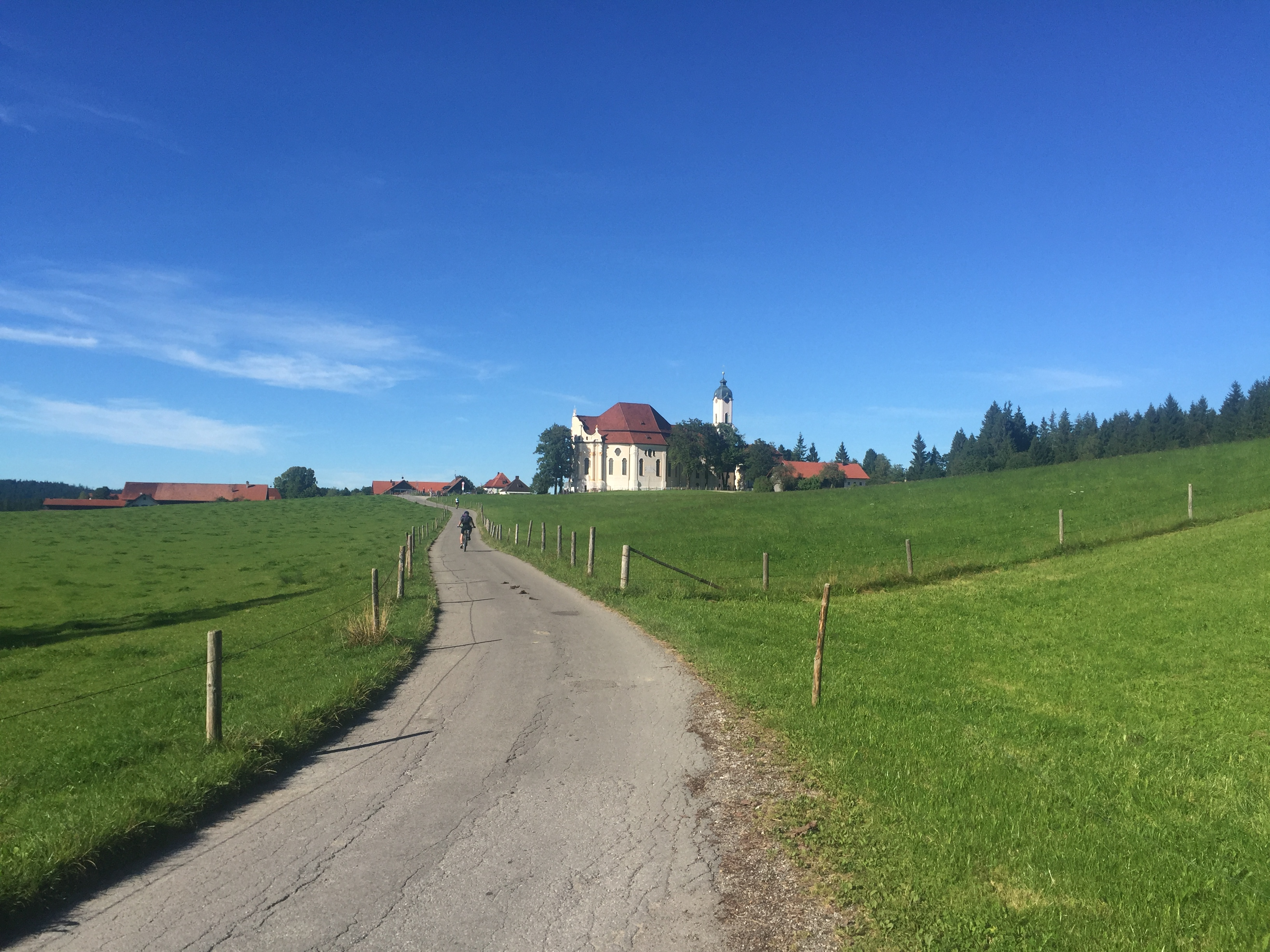

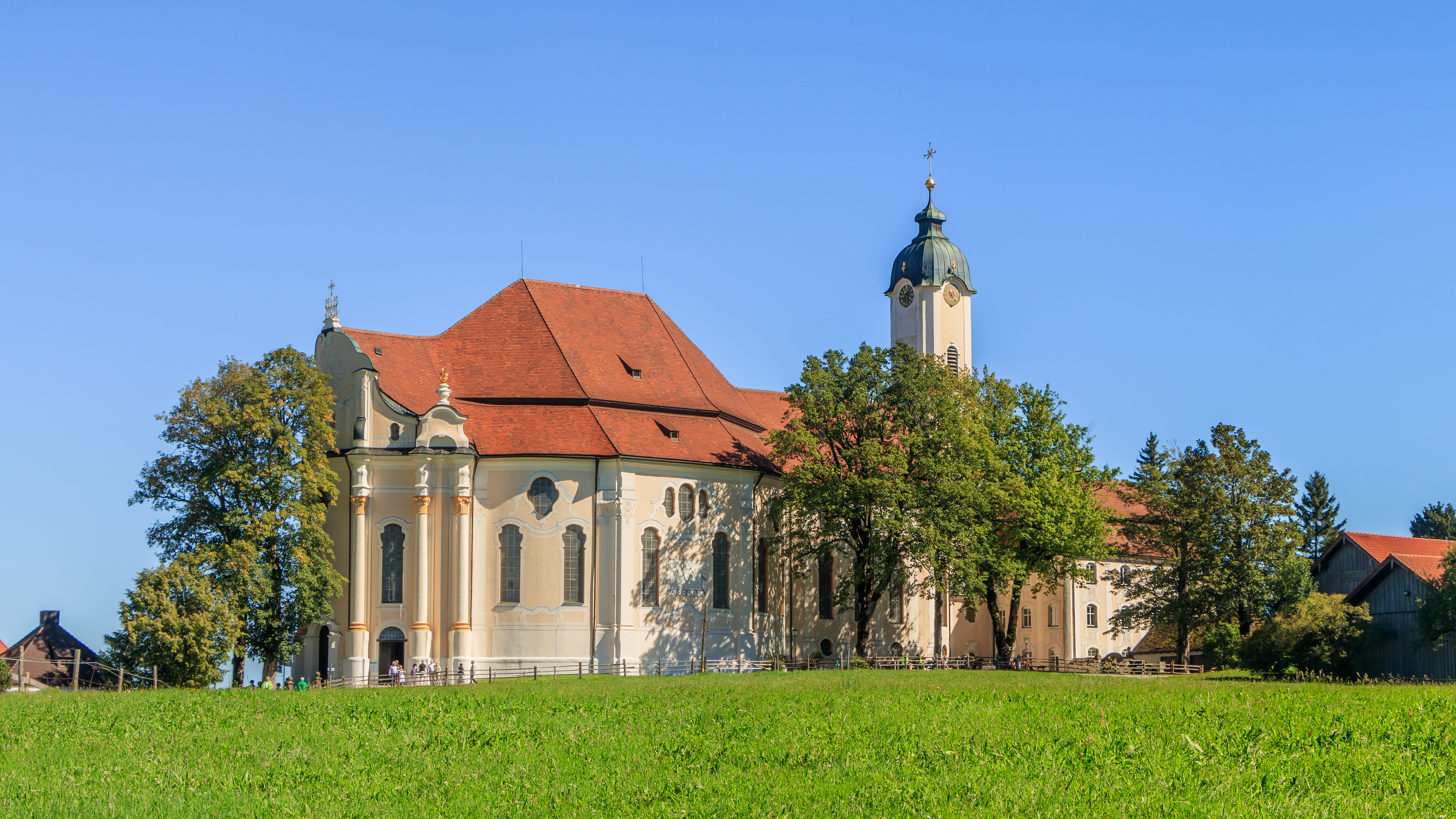

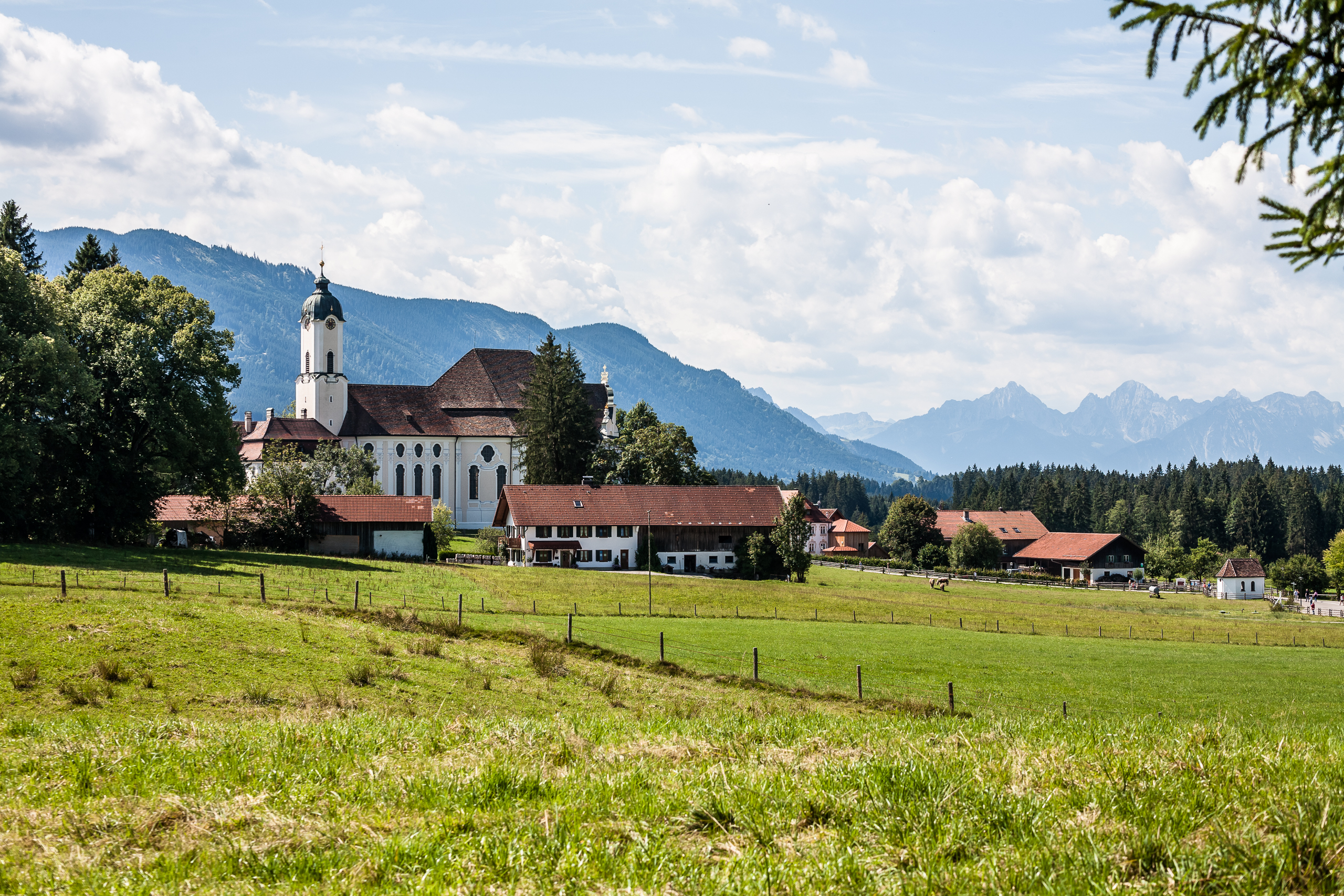

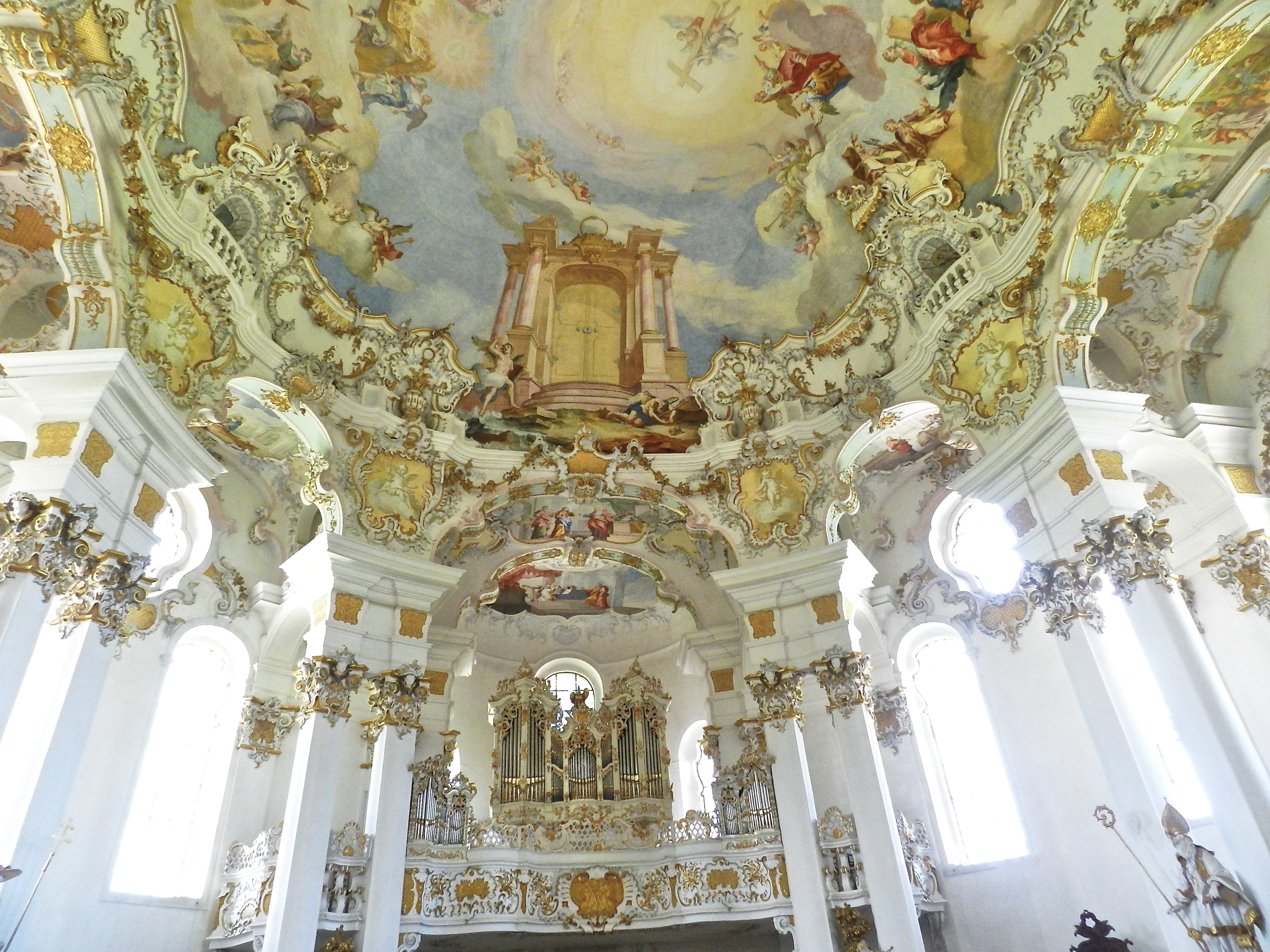

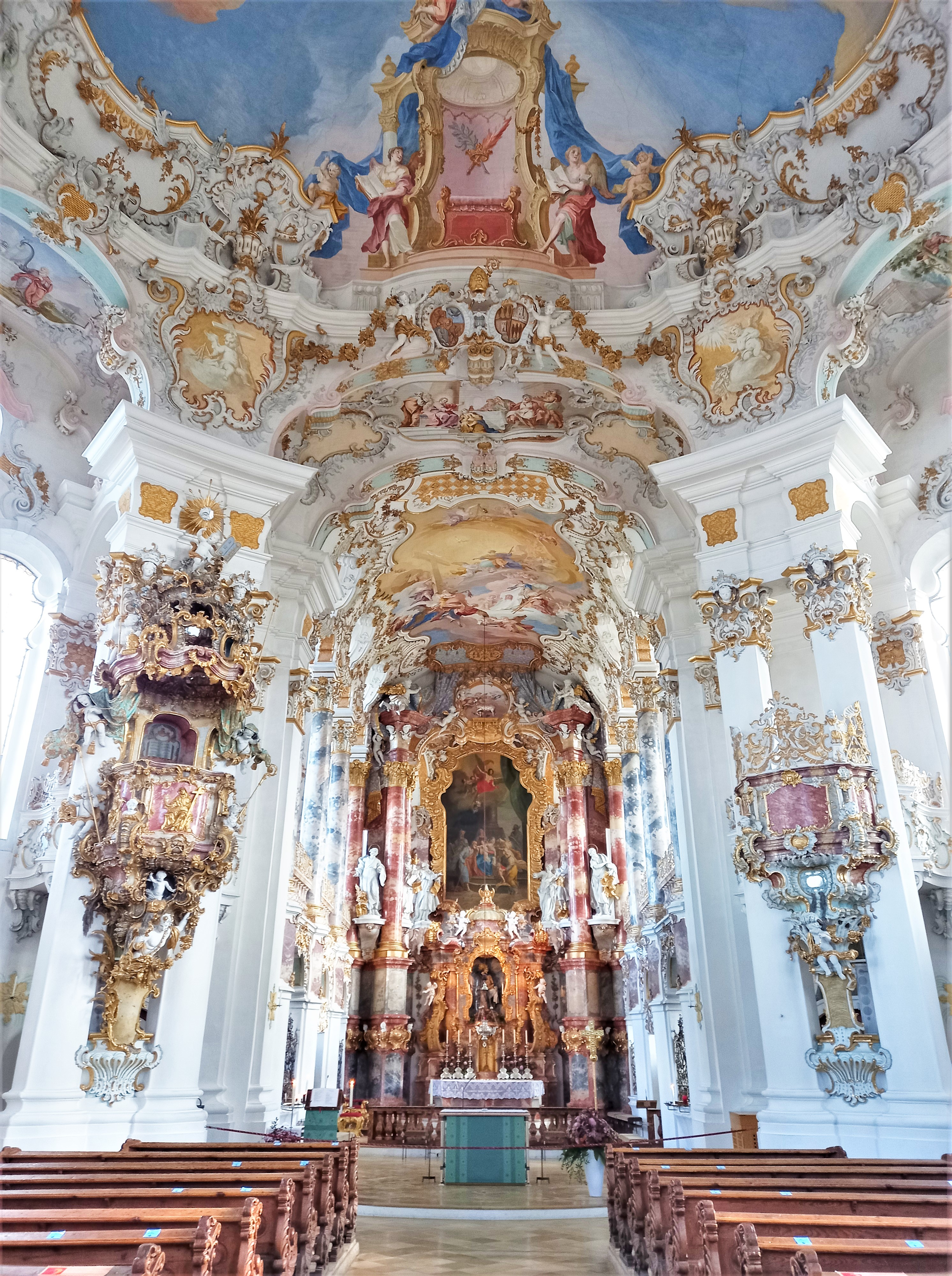

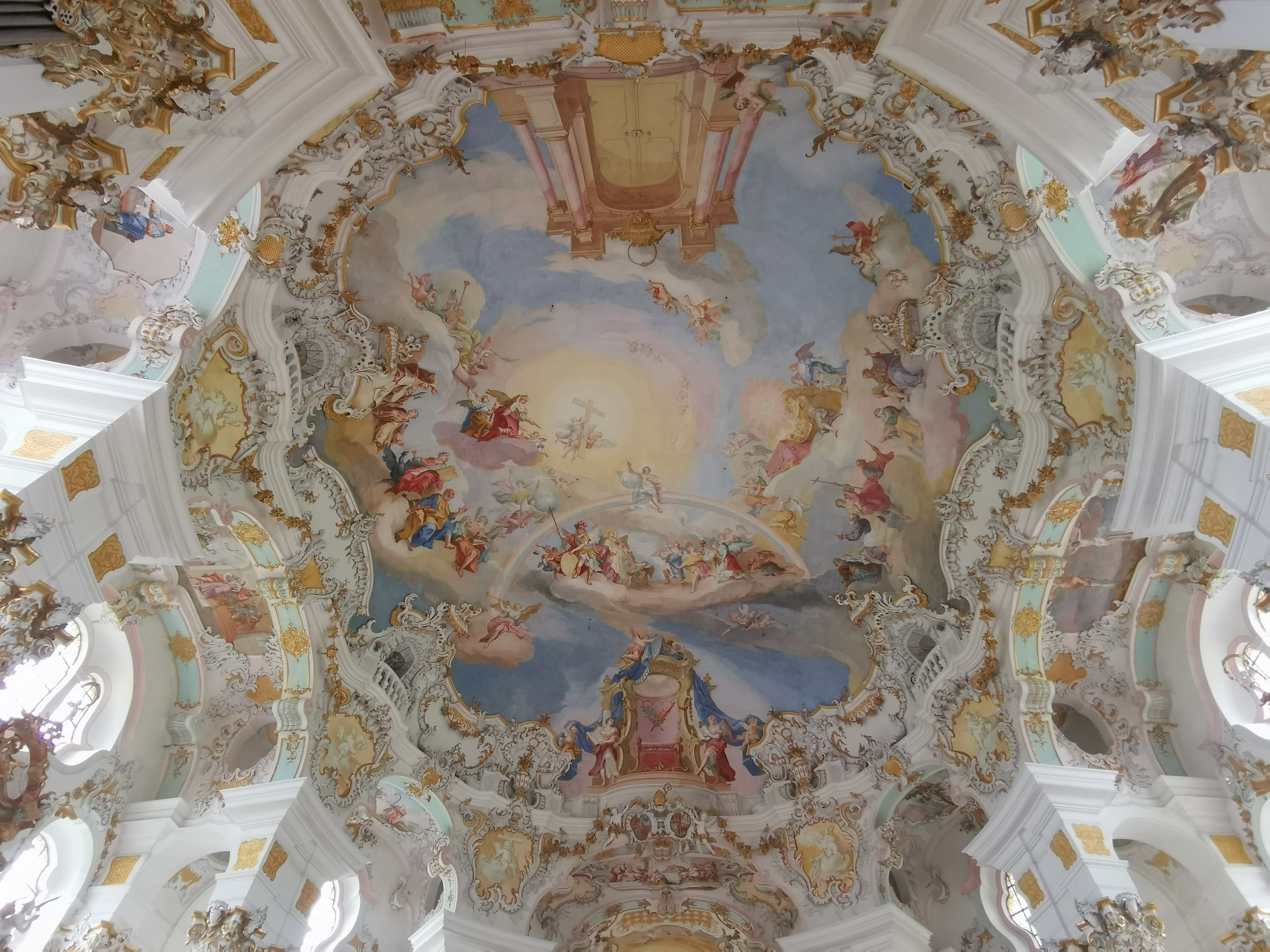

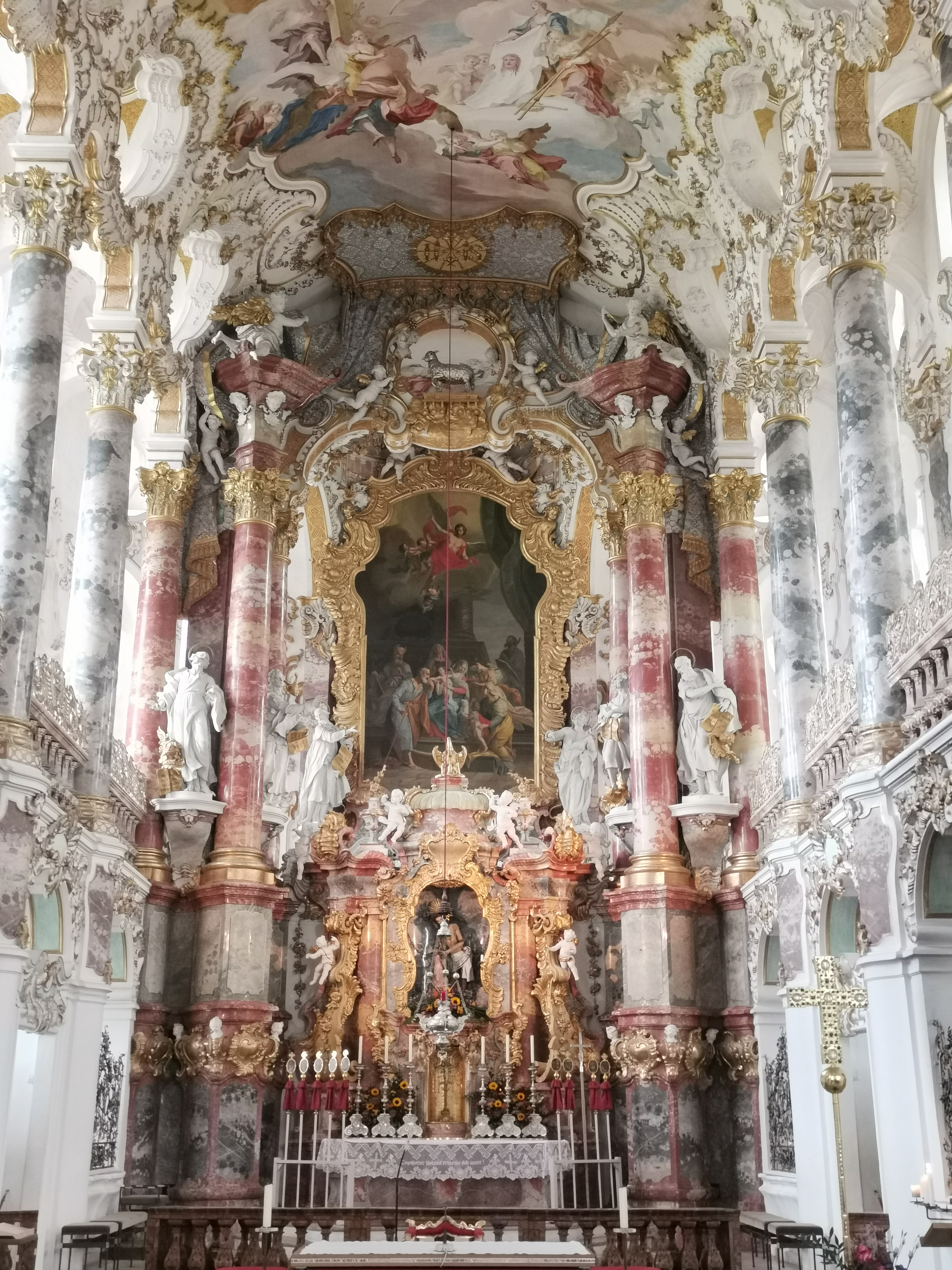

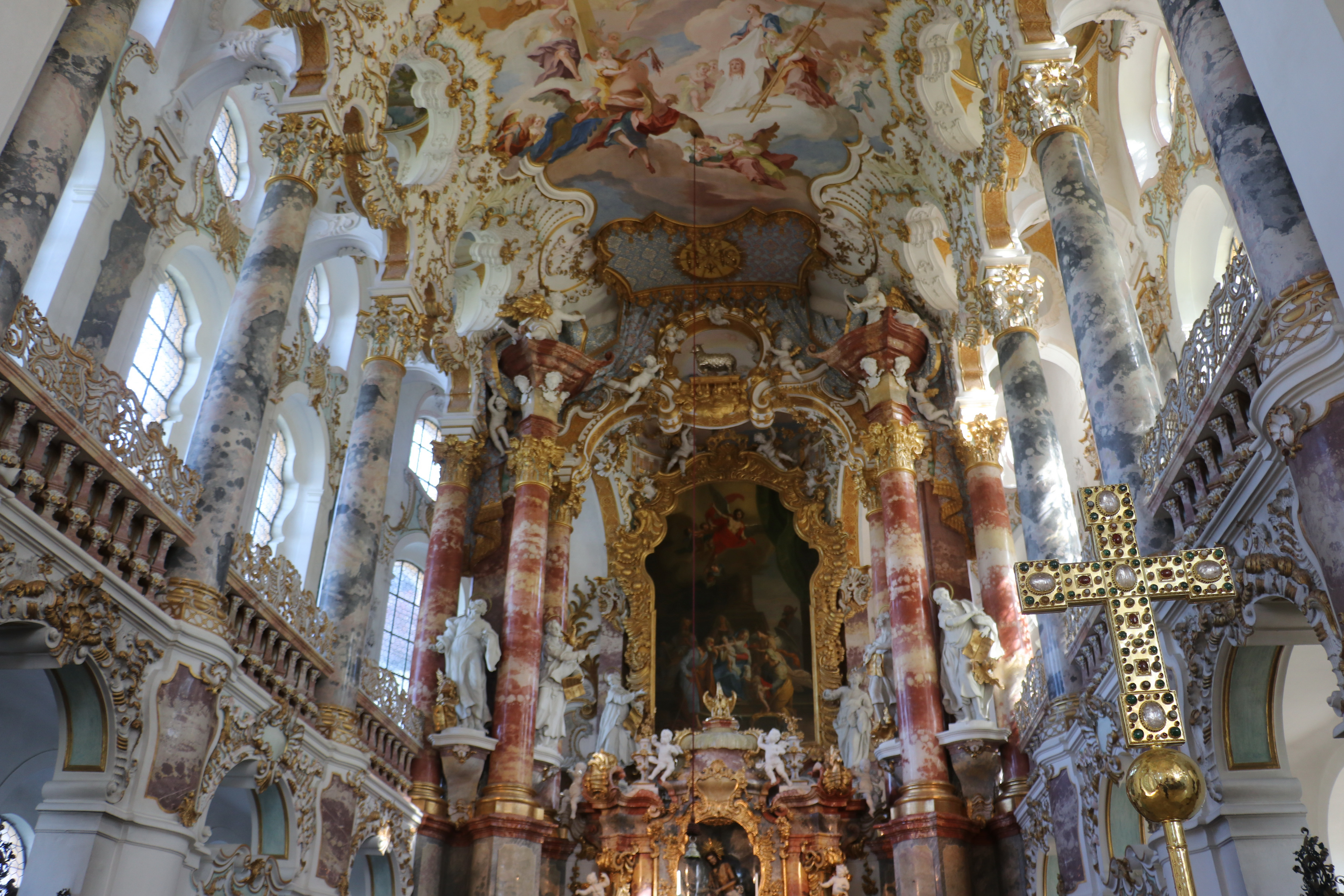

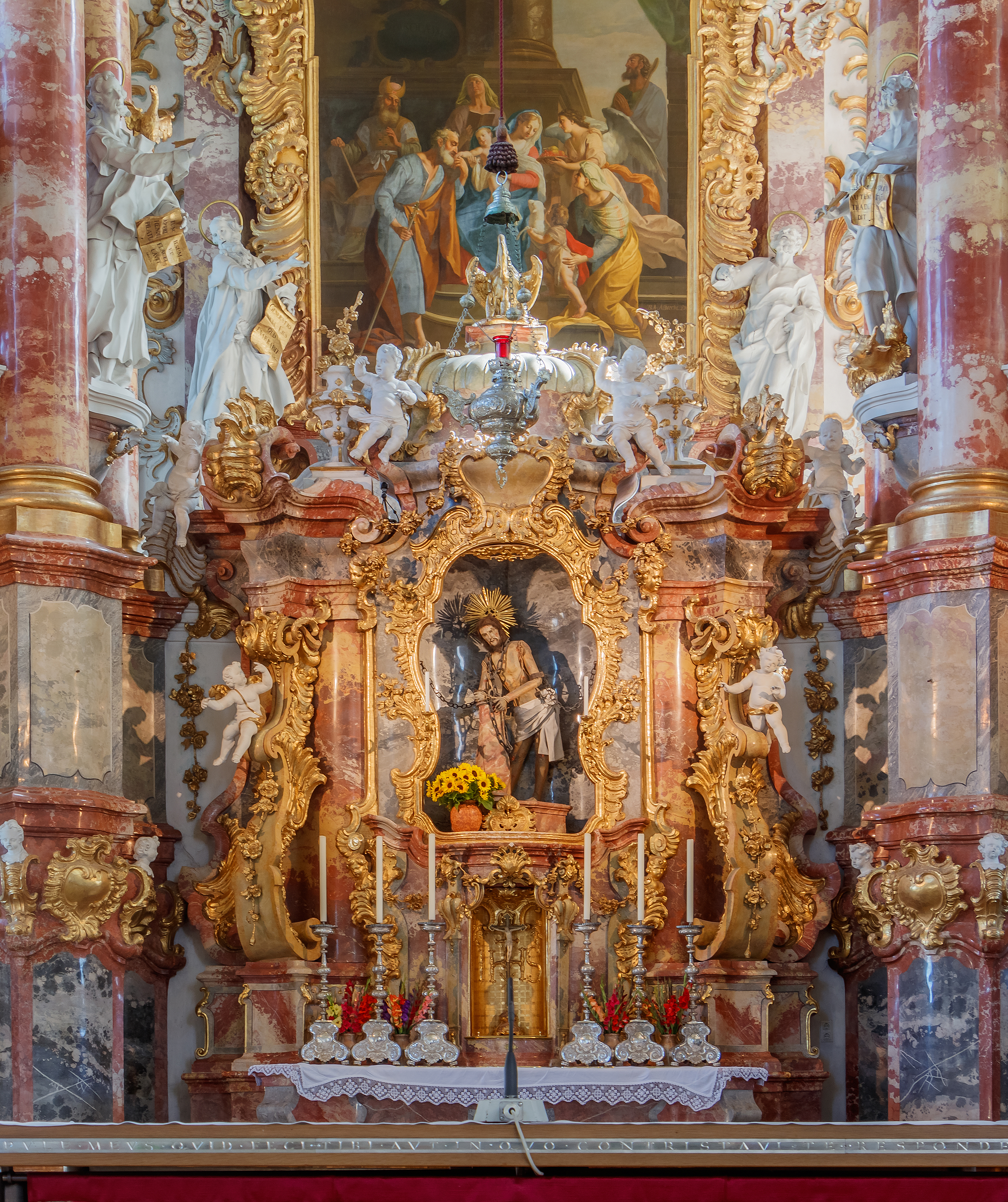

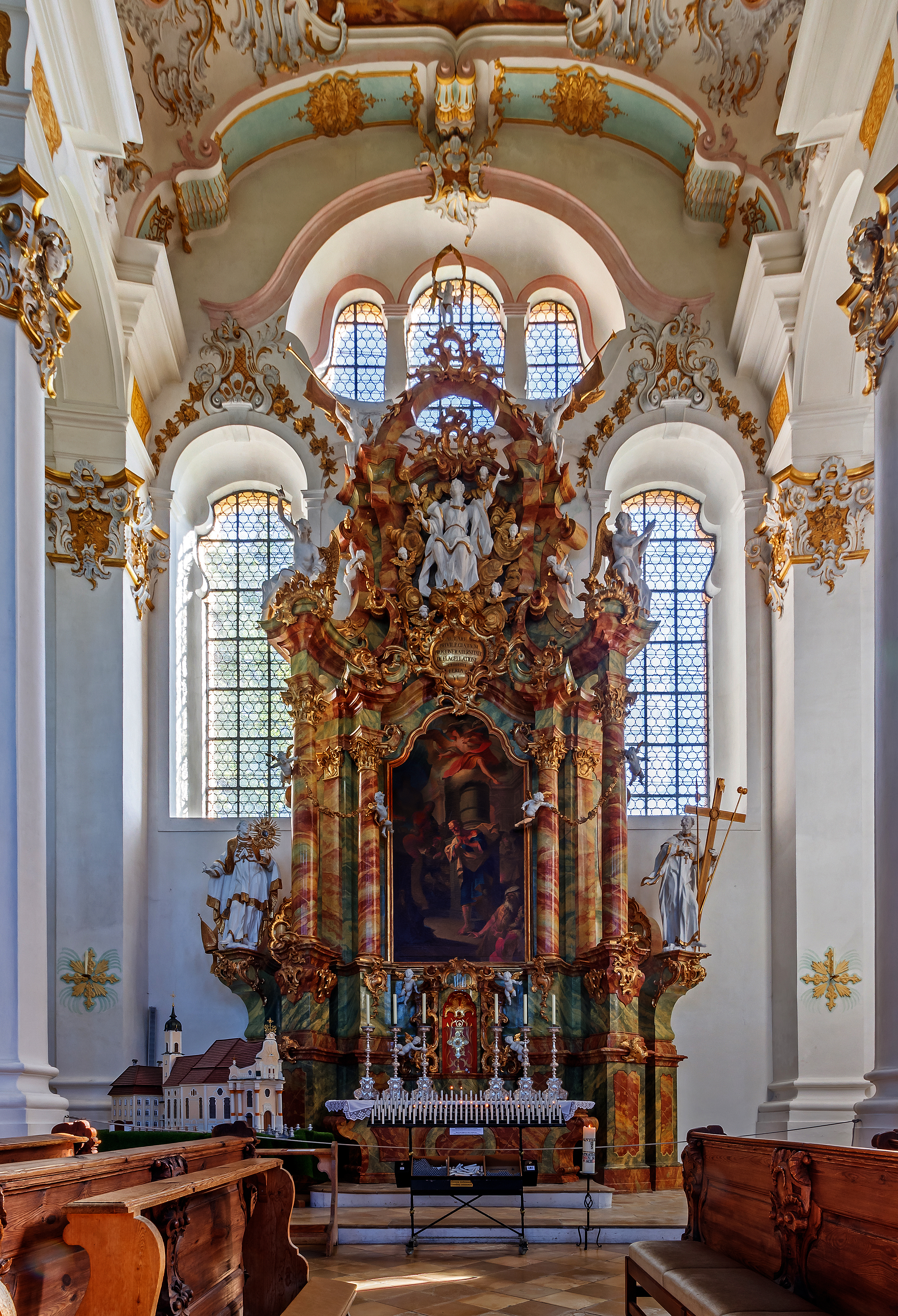

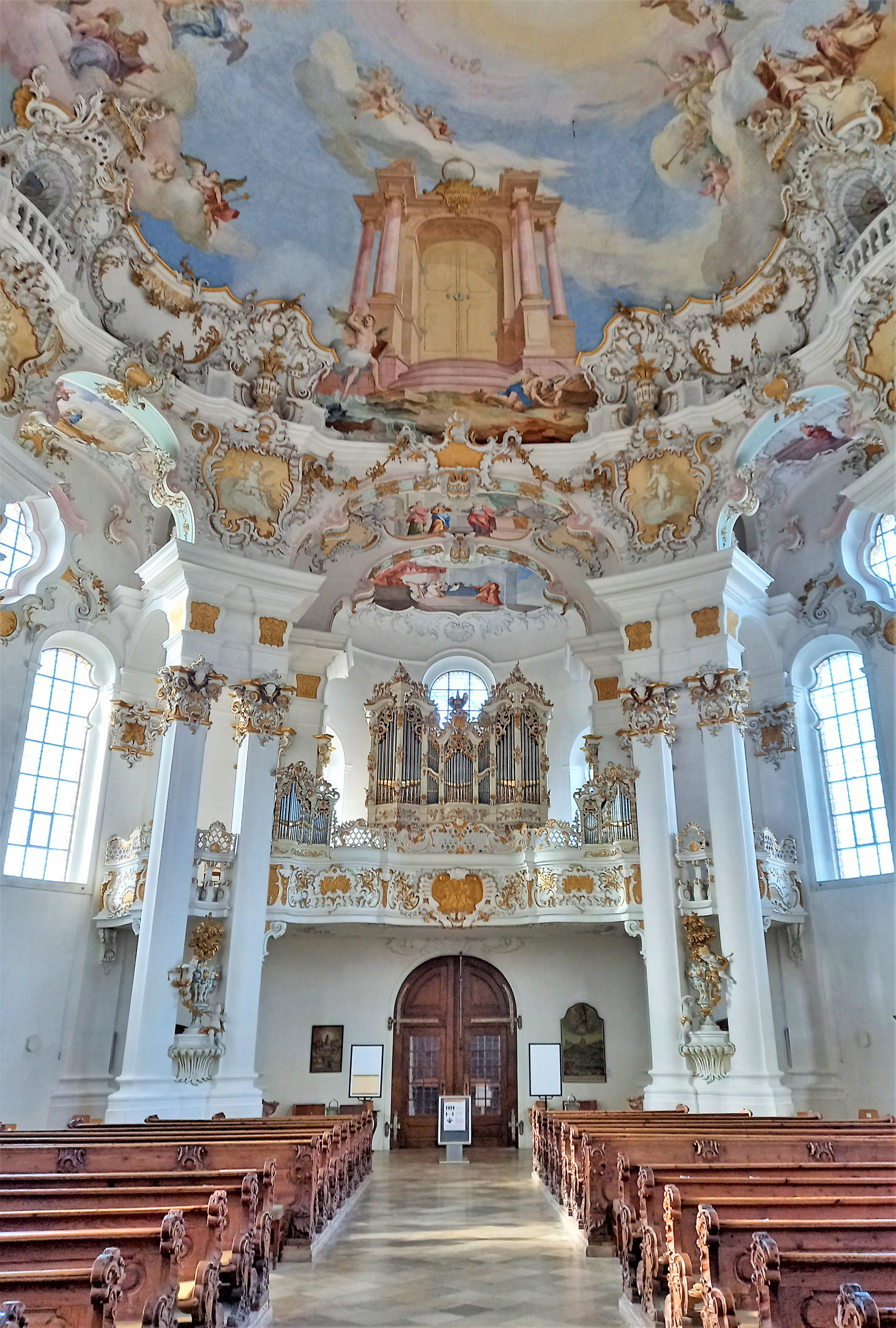

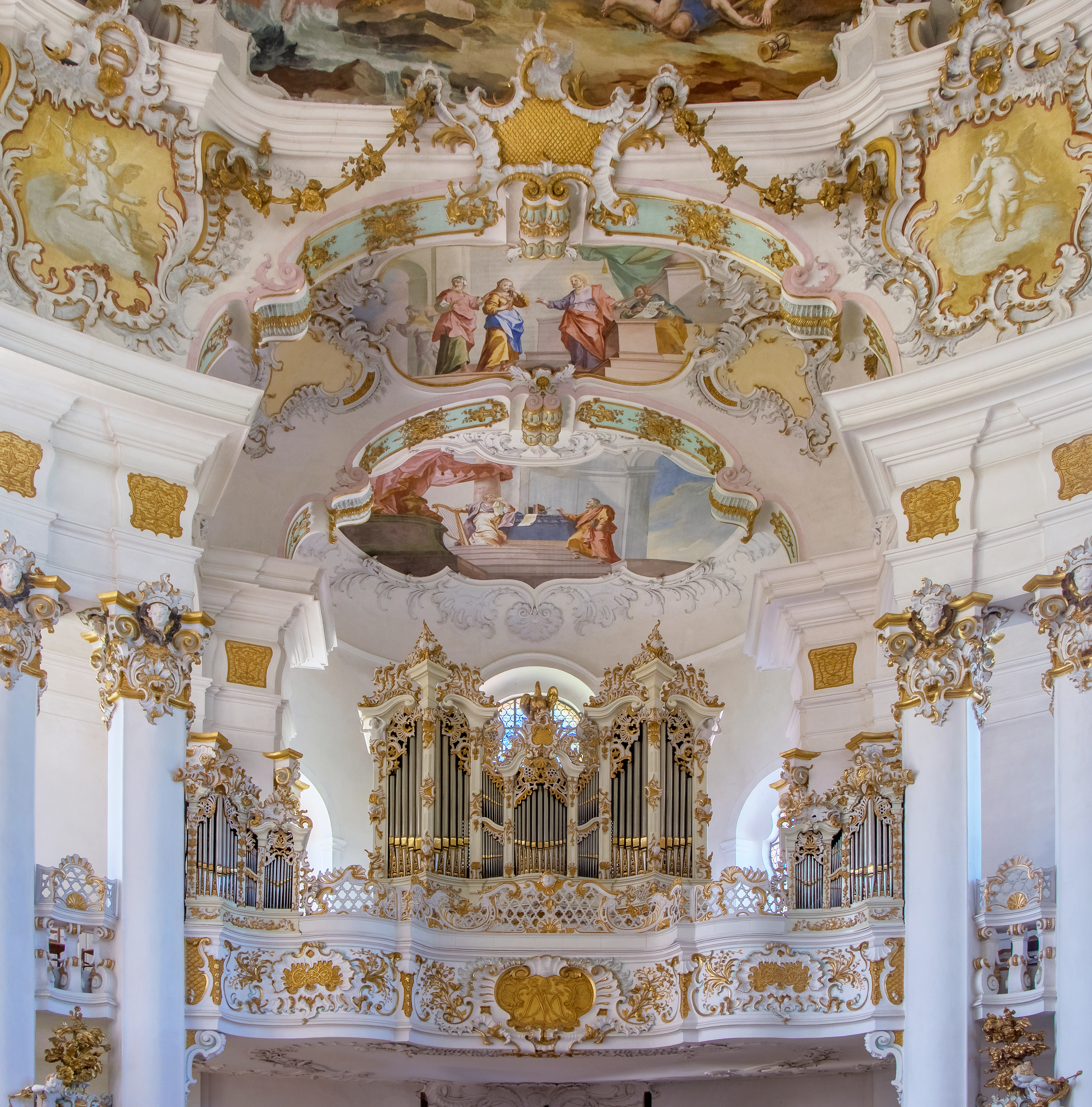

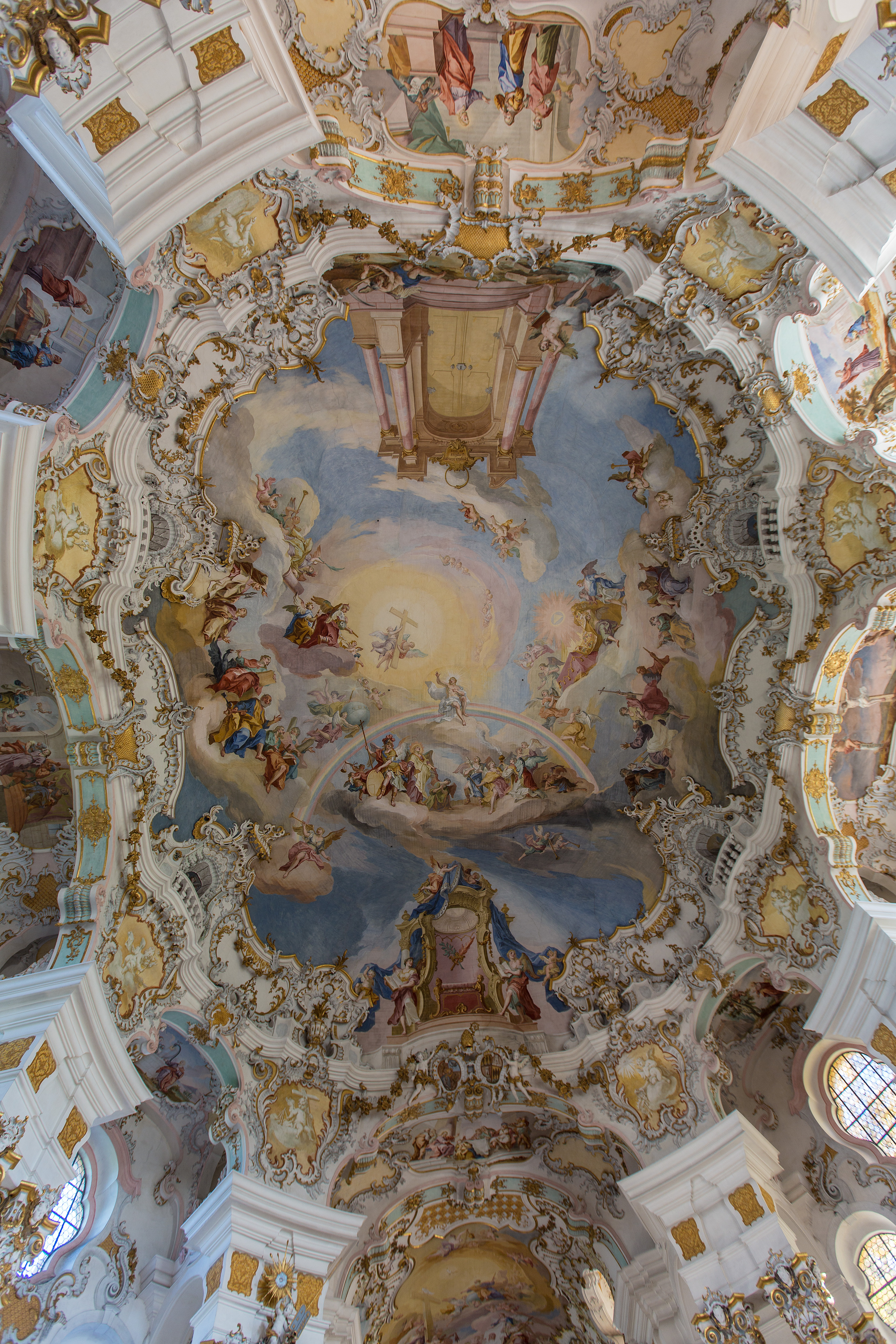

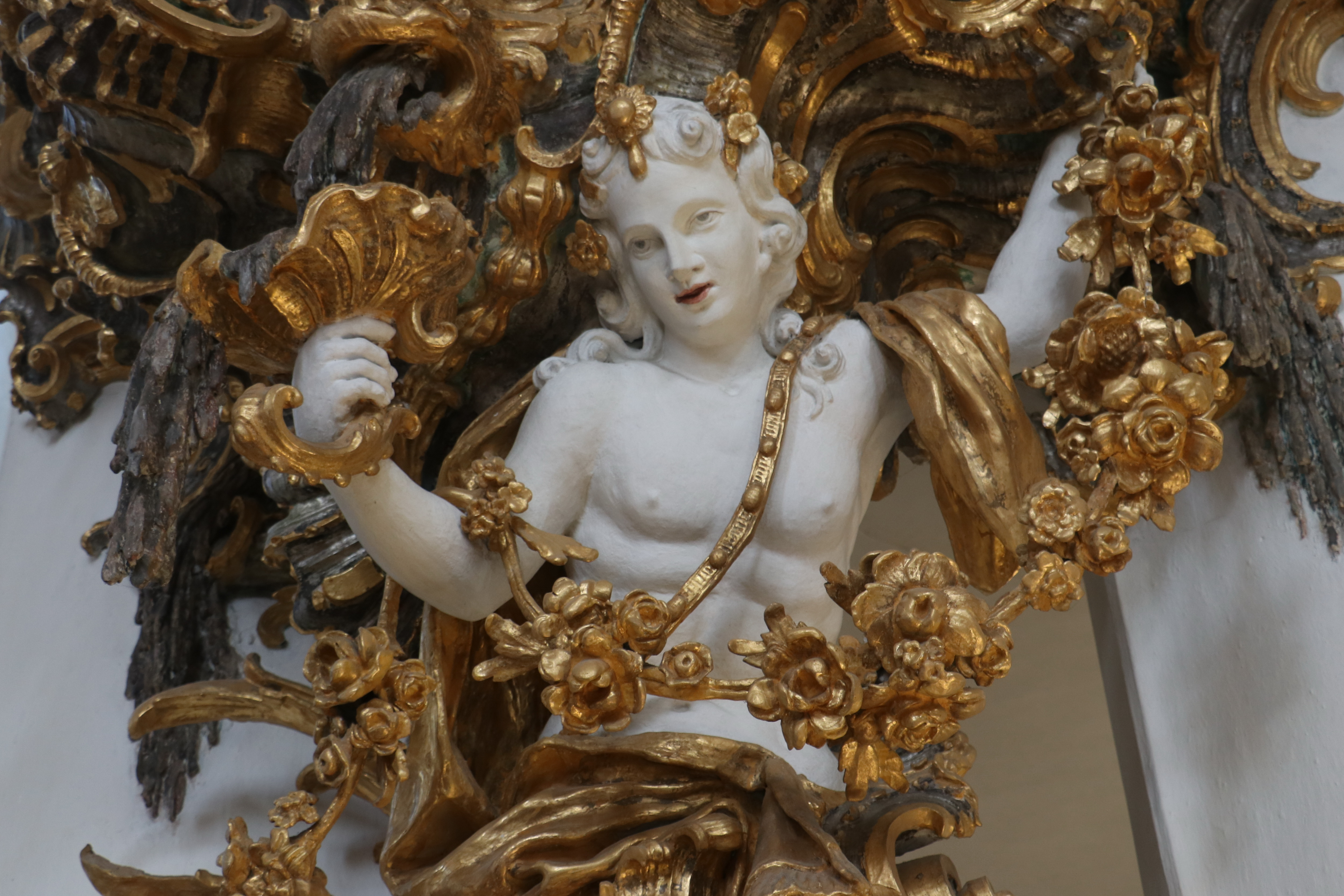

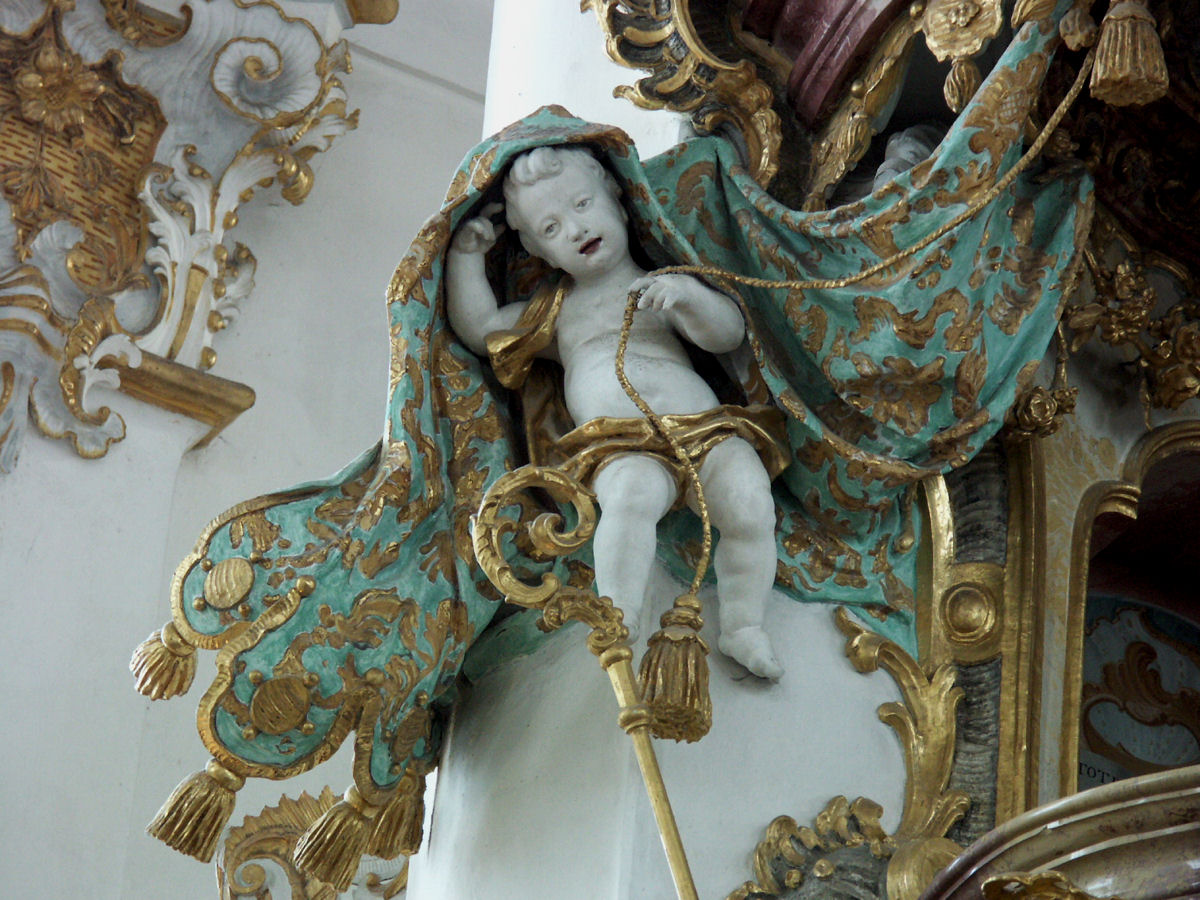

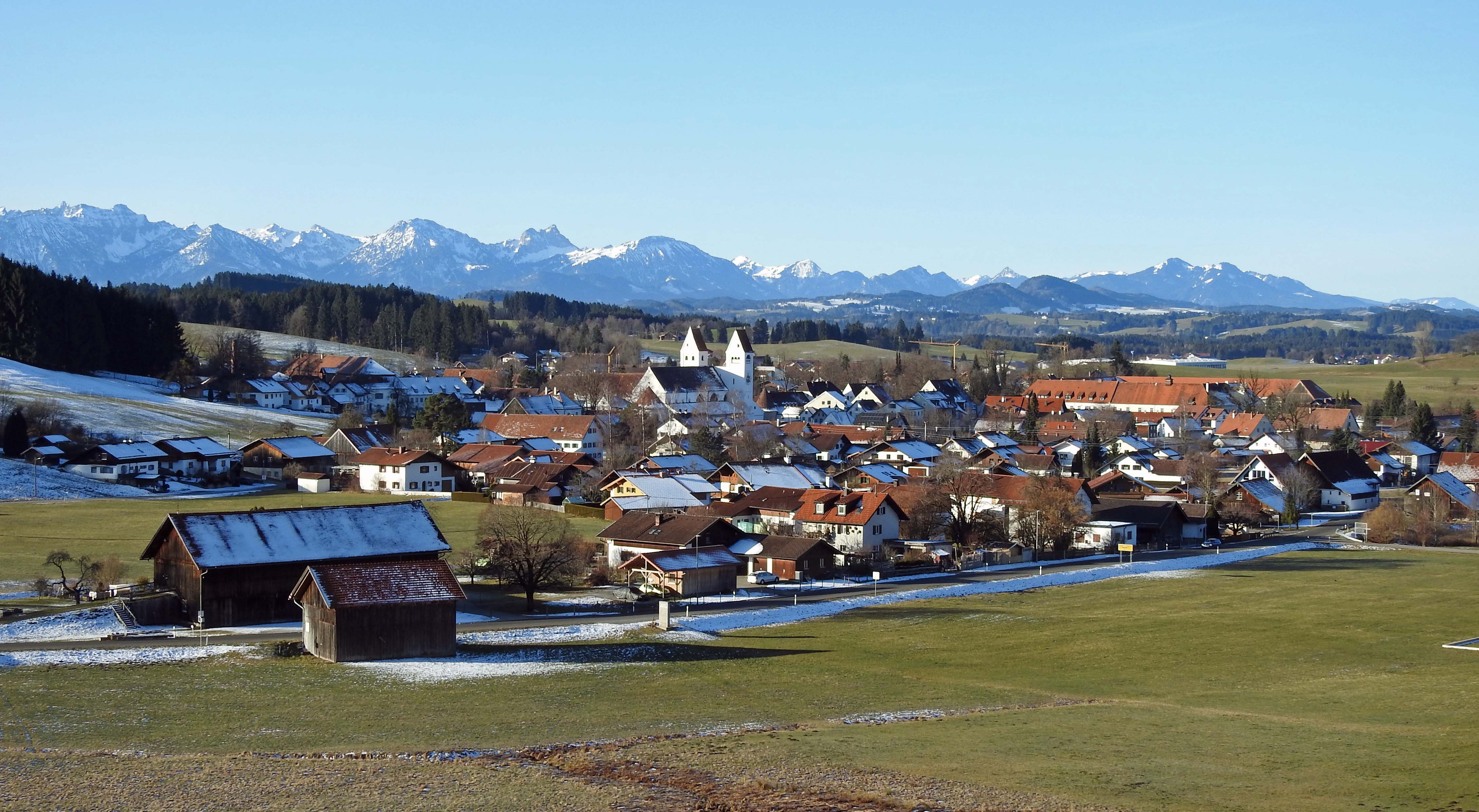
Steingaden

== See also ==
- 18th-century Western domes
