= John de Wet =

Zimbabwean judoka (born 1954)

Personal information
- Nationality: Zimbabwean
- Born: 19 July 1954 (age 70)

Sport
- Sport: Judo

John de Wet (born 19 July 1954) is a Zimbabwean judoka. He competed in the men's half-heavyweight event at the 1980 Summer Olympics.
