= Luiz Virgilio Castro de Moura =

Brazilian judoka

Medal record

Representing Brazil

Men's Judo

World Veterans Championships
Bronze medal – third place	2014 Málaga	+100 kg

Luiz Virgilio "Virgulino" Castro de Moura (Rio de Janeiro, August 23, 1952) is a retired Brazilian judoka. He was a seven time national champion and represented Brazil at the 1980 Summer Olympics and 1981 World Judo Championships. He is considered one of the most renowned Brazilian judokas in the 1980s.

== Biography ==
A trainee under Georges Mehdi, Castro competed many years while served in Brazilian military. He amassed a number of championship wins both in and outside Brazil, winning seven times the national championship at the weigh categories of médio and meio-pessado. Eventually he was elected for the Brazilian Olympic team and represented the country at 1980 in Moscow, where he had a victory over Tsancho Atanasov and a loss to Jean-Luc Rougé. He would compete at the World Championships in Maastricht the next year, losing to the legendary Yasuhiro Yamashita. He then retired and opened a judo academy, closing shortly after in order to become a businessman. In 2014, he returned for the World Veterans Championships, placing third. He is uncle to fellow judo champion David Moura.
