= Daniel Radu (judoka) =

Romanian judoka

Personal information
- Nationality: Romanian
- Born: 10 September 1957 (age 67)

Sport
- Sport: Judo

Daniel Radu (born 10 September 1957) is a Romanian judoka. He competed in the men's half-heavyweight event at the 1980 Summer Olympics.
