= Dariusz Nowakowski =

Polish judoka

Personal information
- Nationality: Polish
- Born: 7 December 1953 (age 71); Kraków, Poland

Sport
- Sport: Judo

Dariusz Nowakowski (born 7 December 1953) is a Polish judoka. He competed in the men's half-heavyweight event at the 1980 Summer Olympics.
