= Jaroslav Nikodým =

Czech judoka

Personal information
- Nationality: Czech
- Born: 14 March 1950 Řeženčice (part of Nový Rychnov), Czechoslovakia
- Died: 3 March 2025 (aged 74)

Sport
- Sport: Judo

Jaroslav Nikodým (14 March 1950 – 3 March 2025) was a Czech judoka. He competed in the men's half-heavyweight event at the 1980 Summer Olympics.
