= Mark Chittenden =

British judoka

Personal information
- Nationality: British
- Born: 12 July 1956 (age 68); Southend-on-Sea, England

Sport
- Sport: Judo

Mark Chittenden (born 12 July 1956) is a British judoka. He competed in the men's half-heavyweight event at the 1980 Summer Olympics. He became champion of Great Britain, winning the middleweight division at the British Judo Championships in 1977.
