= Dendeviin Amgaa =

Mongolian judoka (born 1952)

Personal information
- Nationality: Mongolian
- Born: 25 July 1952 (age 72); Dashinchilen, Mongolia

Sport
- Sport: Judo

Dendeviin Amgaa (born 25 July 1952) is a Mongolian judoka. He competed in the men's half-heavyweight event at the 1980 Summer Olympics.
