= Panikos Eyripidou =

Cypriot judoka (born 1955)

Personal information
- Nationality: Cypriot
- Born: 17 September 1955 (age 69)
- Occupation: Judoka

Sport
- Sport: Judo

Panikos Eyripidou (born 17 September 1955) is a Cypriot judoka. He competed in the men's half-heavyweight event at the 1980 Summer Olympics.
