= Essambo Ewane =

Cameroonian judoka (1952–2023)

Personal information
- Nationality: Cameroonian
- Born: 5 October 1952
- Died: 15 May 2023 (aged 70)

Sport
- Sport: Judo

Essambo Ewane (5 October 1952 – 15 May 2023) was a Cameroonian judoka. He competed at the 1980 Summer Olympics and the 1984 Summer Olympics.

Ewane died on 15 May 2023, at the age of 70.
