= Rolando José Tornés =

Cuban judoka

Personal information
- Nationality: Cuban
- Born: 7 November 1956 (age 68)

Sport
- Sport: Judo

Rolando José Tornés (born 7 November 1956) is a Cuban judoka. He competed in the men's half-heavyweight event at the 1980 Summer Olympics.
