= Steingaden =

- Municipality
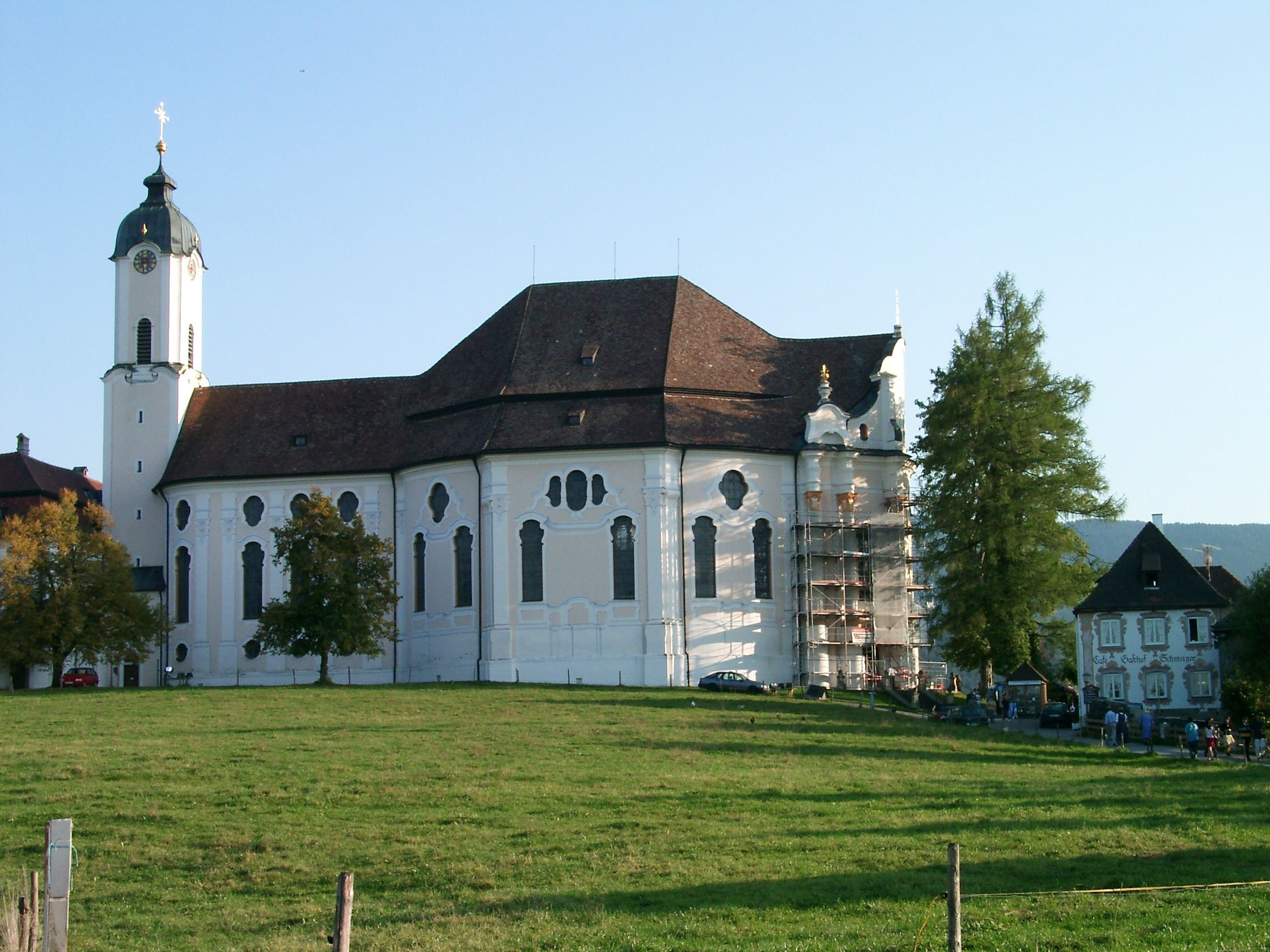
- Pilgrimage church Wieskirche

- Coat of arms

- Location of Steingaden within Weilheim-Schongau district
- Interactive map of Steingaden
- Location within Germany Location within Bavaria
- Coordinates: 47°42′N 10°52′E
- Country: Germany
- State: Bavaria
- Admin. region: Upper Bavaria
- District: Weilheim-Schongau
- Municipal assoc.: Steingaden

Government
  - Mayor (2020–26): Max Bertl

Area
  - Total: 64.05 km^{2} (24.73 sq mi)
- Elevation: 763 m (2,503 ft)

Population (2025-12-31)
  - Total: 2,965
  - Density: 46.29/km^{2} (119.9/sq mi)
- Time zone: UTC+01:00 (CET)
  - Summer (DST): UTC+02:00 (CEST)
- Postal codes: 86989
- Dialling codes: 08862
- Vehicle registration: WM
- Website: www.steingaden.de

Steingaden (German pronunciation: [ˈʃtaɪnɡaːdn̩]) is a municipality in the Weilheim-Schongau district of Upper Bavaria, Germany. It is the site of the 12th-century Steingaden Abbey (Kloster Steingaden) and the Wies Church, a UNESCO World Heritage Site.

== Geography ==
The community lies in the Alpine foothills, on the border between Upper Bavaria and the Allgäu. The quarters (Ortsteile) of the municipality are Fronreiten, Ilgen, Lauterbach, Riesen, Urspring und Wies. Other villages and hamlets are Biberschwöll, Bichl, Boschach, Brandstatt, Butzau, Deutenhof, Deutensee, Egart, Engen, Gagras, Gmeind, Gogel, Graben, Hiebler, Hirschau, Illach, Illberg, Jagdberg, Karlsebene, Kellershof, Kohlhofen, Kreisten, Kreuzberg, Kuchen, Langau, Lechen, Lindegg, Litzau, Maderbichl, Moos, Oberengen, Reitersau, Resle, Sandgraben, Schlatt, Schlauch, Schwarzenbach, Staltannen, Steingädele, Tannen, Thal, Unterengen, Vordergründl, Wiesle und Zöpfhalden.

== History ==
Until the 1803 secularisation of Bavaria, Steingaden belonged to the Steingaden Abbey, established in 1147 by Welf VI, Margrave of Tuscany and Duke of Spoleto, and third son of Henry IX, Duke of Bavaria. In the administrative reform of Bavaria in 1818, Steingaden became an independent municipality, while the formerly independent municipalities of Fronreiten, Lauterbach and Urspring were added to the municipality of Steingaden during the administrative reforms of the 1980s.

== Culture ==
=== Architecture ===
- Wies Church (Wieskirche), a pilgrimage church built by the brothers, Dominic and John Baptist Zimmermann, between 1746 and 1754 in the Rococo style and recognized by UNESCO as a World Heritage Site
- Welfen Church (Welfenmünster), built in 1176 in the Romantic style, now the parish church of the town
- Church of the Visitation, Ilgen
- Church of the Holy Cross, Kreuzberg
- Church of St Mary Magdalene, Urspring

== Residents ==
Johann Georg von Lori was born in Steingaden on 17 July 1723. He became a significant administrator, jurist and historian, and co-founded the Bavarian Academy of Sciences and Humanities. Günther Neureuther, born in the town on 6 August 1955, became one of the most successful jūdōka in Germany.

Gretl Braun, sister of Eva Braun lived her final years and died in Steingarden.
