= Alassane Thioub =

Senegalese judoka

Personal information
- Nationality: Senegalese
- Born: 16 October 1955 (age 70)

Sport
- Sport: Judo

Alassane Thioub (born 16 October 1955) is a Senegalese judoka. He competed in the men's half-heavyweight event at the 1980 Summer Olympics. He later served as national technical director of judo in Senegal.
