= Tsancho Atanasov =

Bulgarian judoka

Personal information
- Nationality: Bulgarian
- Born: 1 December 1954 (age 70)

Sport
- Sport: Judo

Tsancho Atanasov (Bulgarian: Цанчо Атанасов, born 1 December 1954) is a Bulgarian judoka. He competed at the 1976 Summer Olympics and the 1980 Summer Olympics.
