= Wessobrunn =

- Municipality
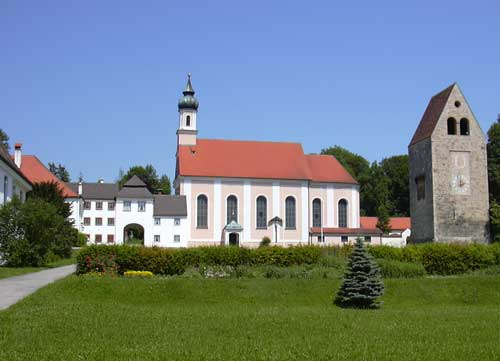
- Saint John the Baptist Church

- Coat of arms

- Location of Wessobrunn within Weilheim-Schongau district
- Interactive map of Wessobrunn
- Location within Germany Location within Bavaria
- Coordinates: 47°53′N 11°2′E
- Country: Germany
- State: Bavaria
- Admin. region: Upper Bavaria
- District: Weilheim-Schongau

Government
  - Mayor (2020–26): Georg Guggemos

Area
  - Total: 51.1 km^{2} (19.7 sq mi)
- Elevation: 702 m (2,303 ft)

Population (2025-12-31)
  - Total: 2,190
  - Density: 42.9/km^{2} (111/sq mi)
- Time zone: UTC+01:00 (CET)
  - Summer (DST): UTC+02:00 (CEST)
- Postal codes: 82405
- Dialling codes: 08809
- Vehicle registration: WM
- Website: www.wessobrunn.de

Wessobrunn (German pronunciation: [ˈvɛsoːbʁʊn]) is a municipality in the district of Weilheim-Schongau in Bavaria in Germany.

== Paterzell airfield ==
Paterzell airfield is located in Wessobrunn. The local aeroclub Luftsportverein Weilheim-Peißenberg competes in glider aerobatics. The German National Champion in 2006, Markus Feyerabend and Hans-Georg Resch are members of the German national team.
