= List of flag bearers for Turkey at the Olympics =

Turkey at the Olympics
- IOC code: TUR
- NOC: Turkish National Olympic Committee
- Website: www.olimpiyatkomitesi.org.tr (in English and Turkish)
- Medals: Gold 41 Silver 29 Bronze 41 Total 111

Summer appearances
- 1908; 1912; 1920; 1924; 1928; 1932; 1936; 1948; 1952; 1956; 1960; 1964; 1968; 1972; 1976; 1980; 1984; 1988; 1992; 1996; 2000; 2004; 2008; 2012; 2016; 2020; 2024; 2028

Winter appearances
- 1936; 1948; 1952; 1956; 1960; 1964; 1968; 1972; 1976; 1980; 1984; 1988; 1992; 1994; 1998; 2002; 2006; 2010; 2014; 2018; 2022; 2026

Other related appearances
- 1906 Intercalated Games

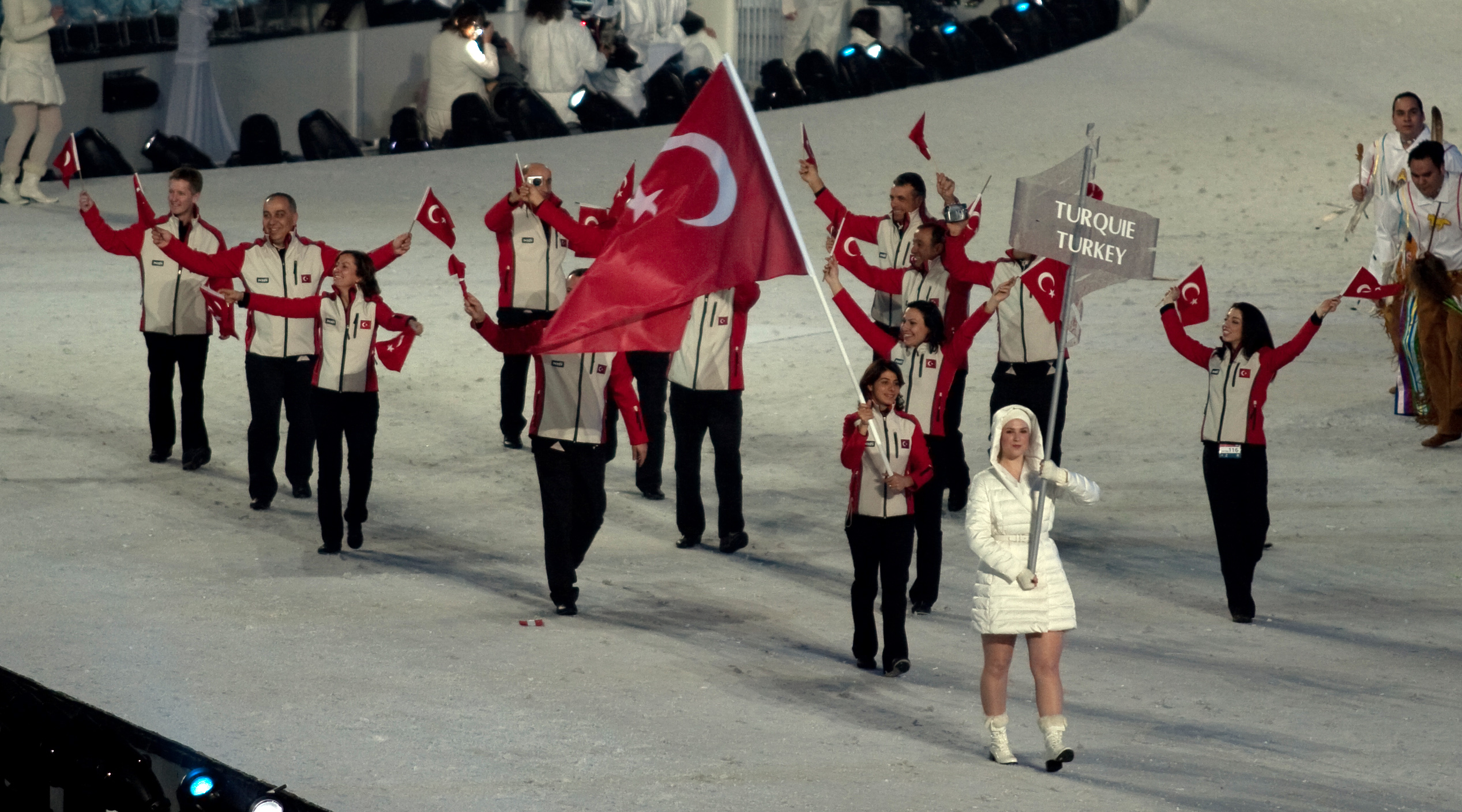
Kelime Çetinkaya bearing Turkish flag at the opening ceremony of the 2010 Winter Olympics

This is a list of flag bearers who have represented Turkey at the Olympics.

Flag bearers carry the national flag of their country at the opening ceremony of the Olympic Games.

| # | Event year | Season | Flag bearer | Sex | Sport | Ref. |
|---|---|---|---|---|---|---|
| 1 | 1908 | Summer | | | | |
| 2 | 1912 | Summer | None (Note: no flag bearer) | — | | |
| 3 | 1924 | Summer | Ünvan Tayfuroğlu | M | Athletics | |
| 4 | 1928 | Summer | | | | |
| 5 | 1936 | Winter | Mehmut Şevket Karman | M | Alpine skiing | |
| 6 | 1936 | Summer | Saim Polatkan | M | Equestrian | |
| 7 | 1948 | Winter | | | | |
| 8 | 1948 | Summer | Muharrem Candaş | M | Wrestling | |
| 9 | 1952 | Summer | Ruhi Sarıalp | M | Athletics | |
| 10 | 1956 | Winter | Osman Yüce | M | Alpine skiing | |
| 11 | 1956 | Summer | Hamit Kaplan | M | Wrestling | |
| 12 | 1960 | Winter | Zeki Şamiloğlu | M | Alpine skiing | |
| 13 | 1960 | Summer | Nuri Turan | M | Athletics (did not compete) | |
| 14 | 1964 | Winter | Osman Yüce | M | Alpine skiing | |
| 15 | 1964 | Summer | Çetin Şahiner | M | Athletics | |
| 16 | 1968 | Winter | Özer Ateşçi | M | Alpine skiing | |
| 17 | 1968 | Summer | Gürbüz Lü | M | Wrestling | |
| 18 | 1972 | Summer | Gıyasettin Yılmaz | M | Wrestling | |
| 19 | 1976 | Winter | Şeref Çınar | M | Cross-country skiing | |
| 20 | 1976 | Summer | Süheyl Yeşilnur | M | Judo | |
| 21 | 1984 | Winter | Erkan Mermut | M | Alpine skiing | |
| 22 | 1984 | Summer | Mehmet Yurdadön | M | Athletics | |
| 23 | 1988 | Winter | Abdullah Yılmaz | M | Cross-country skiing | |
| 24 | 1988 | Summer | Ali Şahin | M | Taekwondo | |
| 25 | 1992 | Winter | Mithat Yıldırım | M | Cross-country skiing | |
| 26 | 1992 | Summer | Kerem Ersü | M | Archery | |
| 27 | 1994 | Winter | Mithat Yıldırım | M | Cross-country skiing | |
| 28 | 1996 | Summer | Derya Büyükuncu | M | Swimming | |
| 29 | 1998 | Winter | Arif Alaftargil | M | Alpine skiing | |
| 30 | 2000 | Summer | Hamza Yerlikaya | M | Wrestling | |
| 31 | 2002 | Winter | Atakan Alaftargil | M | Alpine skiing | |
| 32 | 2004 | Summer | Ali Enver Adakan | M | Sailing | |
| 33 | 2006 | Winter | Tuğba Karademir | F | Figure skating | |
| 34 | 2008 | Summer | Mehmet Özal | M | Wrestling | |
| 35 | 2010 | Winter | Kelime Çetinkaya | F | Cross-country skiing | |
| 36 | 2012 | Summer | Neslihan Demir Darnel | F | Volleyball | |
| 37 | 2014 | Winter | Alper Uçar | M | Figure skating | |
| 38 | 2016 | Summer | Rıza Kayaalp | M | Wrestling | |
| 39 | 2018 | Winter | Fatih Arda İpcioğlu | M | Ski jumping | |
| 40 | 2020 | Summer | Merve Tuncel | F | Swimming | |
| 40 | 2020 | Summer | Berke Saka | M | Swimming | |
| 41 | 2022 | Winter | Ayşenur Duman | F | Cross-country skiing | |
| 41 | 2022 | Winter | Furkan Akar | M | Short track speed skating | |
| 42 | 2024 | Summer | Busenaz Sürmeneli | F | Boxing | |
| 42 | 2024 | Summer | Mete Gazoz | M | Archery | |
| 43 | 2026 | Winter | İrem Dursun | F | Cross-country skiing | |
| 43 | 2026 | Winter | Furkan Akar | M | Short track speed skating | |

== See also ==
- Turkey at the Olympics
