= Turkey at the 1906 Intercalated Games =

Turkey at the Olympics

- Flag of the Ottoman Empire
- IOC code: TUR

in Athens
- Competitors: 1 in 1 sport
- Medals: Gold 0 Silver 0 Bronze 0 Total 0

Summer appearances
- 1908; 1912; 1920; 1924; 1928; 1932; 1936; 1948; 1952; 1956; 1960; 1964; 1968; 1972; 1976; 1980; 1984; 1988; 1992; 1996; 2000; 2004; 2008; 2012; 2016; 2020; 2024

Winter appearances
- 1936; 1948; 1952; 1956; 1960; 1964; 1968; 1972; 1976; 1980; 1984; 1988; 1992; 1994; 1998; 2002; 2006; 2010; 2014; 2018; 2022; 2026

The Ottoman Empire competed at the 1906 Intercalated Games in Athens, Greece. One male athlete competed in two events in one sport.

Two football teams from cities within the Ottoman Empire participated in the football event. Smyrna won silver medals and Thessaloniki bronze medals. However, the Smyrna team is classified as a mixed team since it consisted of English and French players, and the Thessaloniki team is listed as Greek, since they were recruited among Greeks from the group of "Friends of the Arts" (Omilos Philomuson).

== Athletics ==
Track

Athlete	Events	Heat		Final	
Athlete	Events	Result	Rank	Result	Rank
Vahram Papazyan	800 metres	Unknown	Unknown	did not advance	
Vahram Papazyan	1500 metres	Unknown	Unknown	did not advance	
