= Spain at the 1936 Winter Olympics =

- IOC code: ESP
- NOC: Spanish Olympic Committee
- Website: www.coe.es (in Spanish)

in Garmisch-Partenkirchen, Nazi Germany 6–18 February 1936
- Competitors: 6 (4 men, 2 women) in 2 sports
- Flag bearer: Jesús Suárez-Valgrande
- Medals: Gold 0 Silver 0 Bronze 0 Total 0

Winter Olympics appearances (overview)
- 1936; 1948; 1952; 1956; 1960; 1964; 1968; 1972; 1976; 1980; 1984; 1988; 1992; 1994; 1998; 2002; 2006; 2010; 2014; 2018; 2022; 2026

Spain participated at the 1936 Winter Olympics in Garmisch-Partenkirchen, Germany, held between 6 and 16 February 1936. The country's participation in the Games marked its debut appearance at the Winter Olympics.

The Spanish team consisted of six athletes including two women who competed across two sports. Skier Jesús Suárez-Valgrande was the country's flag-bearer during the opening ceremony. The team did not win any medals, and as of this edition, Spain had not won any Winter Games medal.

== Background ==
Spain was represented by nine athletes at the 1900 Summer Olympics at Paris. The Spanish Olympic Committee was formed in 1905, and the country next appeared in the 1920 Summer Olympics. Though the nation had been competing in all the Summer Olympic Games since then, it did not compete in the Winter Olympics. This edition of the Winter Games marked the country's debut in the Winter Olympics.

The 1936 Winter Olympics were held in Garmisch-Partenkirchen, Germany, between 6 and 16 February 1936. The Spanish delegation consisted of six athletes competing across two sports. Skier Jesús Suárez-Valgrande served as the country's flag-bearer in the Parade of Nations during the opening ceremony. The team did not win any medals, and as of this edition, Spain had not won any Winter Games medal.

== Competitors ==
There were six athletes including two women who took part in the medal events across two sports.

Sport	Men	Women	Athletes
Alpine skiing	0	2	2
Cross-country skiing	4	0	4
Total	4	2	6

== Alpine skiing ==
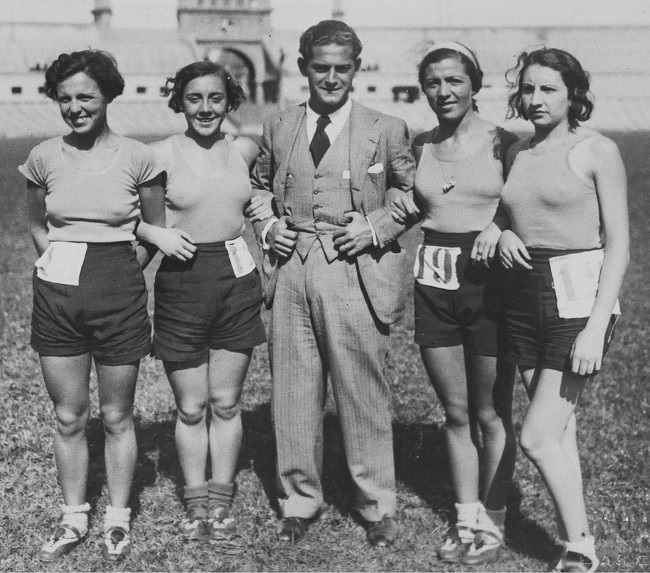
Margot Moles (second from right) was one of the competitors in alpine skiing

Alpine skiing competitions for women were held on 7 and 8 February at Kreuzeck-Gebiet. Ernestina Maenza and Margot Moles represented the nation in the women's combined event. Both Maenza and Moles were multi-sport players, and also represented Real Canoe NC in native Spain. Both the athletes failed to record a finish in the event.

Athlete	Event	Downhill		Slalom			Total	
Athlete	Event	Time	Rank	Time 1	Time 2	Rank	Total points	Rank
Ernestina Maenza	Women's combined	18:51.4	37	DNS	–	–	DNF	–
Margot Moles	Women's combined	10:52.4	35	2:50.1	DSQ	–	DNF	–

== Cross-country skiing ==
Cross-country skiing competitions for men were held between 12 and 15 February at Olympia-Skistadion. Four athletes represented Spain in the men's 18 km event. While Enrique Millán failed to record a finish, the other three were ranked in the early sixties.

Athlete	Event	Time	Rank
Enrique Millán	Men's 18 km	DNF	–
Jesús Suárez	Men's 18 km	1'39:12	63
José Oriol Canals	Men's 18 km	1'40:14	65
Tomas Velasco	Men's 18 km	1'37:25	62
