= Turkey at the 1964 Winter Olympics =

- IOC code: TUR
- NOC: Turkish National Olympic Committee
- Website: olimpiyat.org.tr (in English and Turkish)

in Innsbruck
- Competitors: 5 (men) in 1 sport
- Medals: Gold 0 Silver 0 Bronze 0 Total 0

Winter Olympics appearances (overview)
- 1936; 1948; 1952; 1956; 1960; 1964; 1968; 1972; 1976; 1980; 1984; 1988; 1992; 1994; 1998; 2002; 2006; 2010; 2014; 2018; 2022; 2026; 2030

Turkey competed at the 1964 Winter Olympics in Innsbruck, Austria.

== Alpine skiing ==
Men

Athlete	Event	Race	
Athlete	Event	Time	Rank
Abdurrahman Küçük	Downhill	3:09.99	72
Zeki Şamiloğlu	Downhill	3:05.71	71
Osman Yüce	Downhill	3:03.66	70
Muzaffer Demirhan	Downhill	2:45.63	63
Abdurrahman Küçük	Giant Slalom	3:07.63	79
Muzaffer Demirhan	Giant Slalom	2:41.42	74
Osman Yüce	Giant Slalom	2:32.11	71
Zeki Şamiloğlu	Giant Slalom	2:28.76	69

Men's slalom

Athlete	Qualifying				Final					
Athlete	Time 1	Rank	Time 2	Rank	Time 1	Rank	Time 2	Rank	Total	Rank
Bahattin Topal	1:25.99	80	1:07.69	46	did not advance					
Osman Yüce	1:18.75	76	DSQ	–	did not advance					
Zeki Şamiloğlu	1:12.81	70	1:12.03	50	did not advance					
Muzaffer Demirhan	1:12.26	69	1:08.20	48	did not advance					
