= Turkey at the 2028 Summer Olympics =

- IOC code: TUR
- NOC: Turkish National Olympic Committee
- Website: olimpiyat.org.tr (in English and Turkish)

in Los Angeles, United States 14 July 2028 – 30 July 2028
- Competitors: 12 in 1 sport
- Medals: Gold 0 Silver 0 Bronze 0 Total 0

Summer Olympics appearances (overview)
- 1908; 1912; 1920; 1924; 1928; 1932; 1936; 1948; 1952; 1956; 1960; 1964; 1968; 1972; 1976; 1980; 1984; 1988; 1992; 1996; 2000; 2004; 2008; 2012; 2016; 2020; 2024; 2028

Other related appearances
- 1906 Intercalated Games

Turkey is scheduled to compete at the 2028 Summer Olympics in Los Angeles, from 14 to 30 July 2028. Since the nation's official debut in 1908, Turkish athletes have appeared in every edition of the Summer Olympic Games, except for three occasions: Antwerp 1920, because of sanction against the Central Powers including the Ottoman Empire, Los Angeles 1932 during the period of the Great Depression, and Moscow 1980, as part of the United States-led boycott.

== Competitors ==
The following is the list of number of competitors in the Games.

Sport	Men	Women	Total
Volleyball	0	12	12
Total	0	12	12

== Volleyball ==
Turkey women's team secured qualification for the Games by winning the competition and claiming the direct European qualification at the 2026 Women's European Volleyball Championship in Istanbul.

Team	Event	Group stage				Quarterfinal	Semifinal	Final / BM	
Team	Event	Opposition Score	Opposition Score	Opposition Score	Rank	Opposition Score	Opposition Score	Opposition Score	Rank
Turkey women's	Women's tournament								
