= Turkey at the 1948 Winter Olympics =

- IOC code: TUR
- NOC: Turkish National Olympic Committee
- Website: olimpiyat.org.tr (in English and Turkish)

in St. Moritz
- Competitors: 4 (men) in 1 sport
- Medals: Gold 0 Silver 0 Bronze 0 Total 0

Winter Olympics appearances (overview)
- 1936; 1948; 1952; 1956; 1960; 1964; 1968; 1972; 1976; 1980; 1984; 1988; 1992; 1994; 1998; 2002; 2006; 2010; 2014; 2018; 2022; 2026; 2030

Turkey competed at the 1948 Winter Olympics in St. Moritz, Switzerland.

== Alpine skiing ==
Men

Athlete	Event	Race 1		Race 2		Total	
Athlete	Event	Time	Rank	Time	Rank	Time	Rank
Muzaffer Demirhan	Downhill					DSQ	–
Osman Yüce	Downhill					4:49.2	97
Dursun Bozkurt	Downhill					4:37.3	94
Raşit Tolun	Downhill					4:12.1	87
Muzaffer Demirhan	Slalom	2:25.5	64	2:00.2	64	4:25.7	64
Osman Yüce	Slalom	2:21.2 (+0:05)	63	1:47.4	62	4:08.6	60
Dursun Bozkurt	Slalom	2:18.2 (+0:10)	61	1:53.0	63	4:11.2	62
Raşit Tolun	Slalom	2:04.8	58	1:37.2	57	3:42.0	58

Men's combined

The downhill part of this event was held along with the main medal event of downhill skiing. For athletes competing in both events, the same time was used (see table above for the results). The slalom part of the event was held separate from the main medal event of slalom skiing (included in table below).

Athlete	Slalom			Total (downhill + slalom)	
Athlete	Time 1	Time 2	Rank	Points	Rank
Osman Yüce	–	–	–	DNF	–
Dursun Bozkurt	–	–	–	DNF	–
