= Turkey at the 2010 Winter Olympics =

- IOC code: TUR
- NOC: Turkish National Olympic Committee
- Website: olimpiyat.org.tr (in English and Turkish)

in Vancouver
- Competitors: 5 in 3 sports
- Flag bearer: Kelime Çetinkaya
- Medals: Gold 0 Silver 0 Bronze 0 Total 0

Winter Olympics appearances (overview)
- 1936; 1948; 1952; 1956; 1960; 1964; 1968; 1972; 1976; 1980; 1984; 1988; 1992; 1994; 1998; 2002; 2006; 2010; 2014; 2018; 2022; 2026

Turkey participated at the 2010 Winter Olympics in Vancouver, British Columbia, Canada.

== Competitors ==
Sport	Men	Women	Total
Alpine skiing	1	1	2
Cross-country skiing	1	1	2
Figure skating	0	1	1
Total	2	3	5

== Alpine skiing ==
Men

Athlete	Event	Run 1	Run 2	Total	Rank
Erdinç Türksever	Slalom	DNF	–	–	–
Erdinç Türksever	Giant slalom	DNF	–	–	–

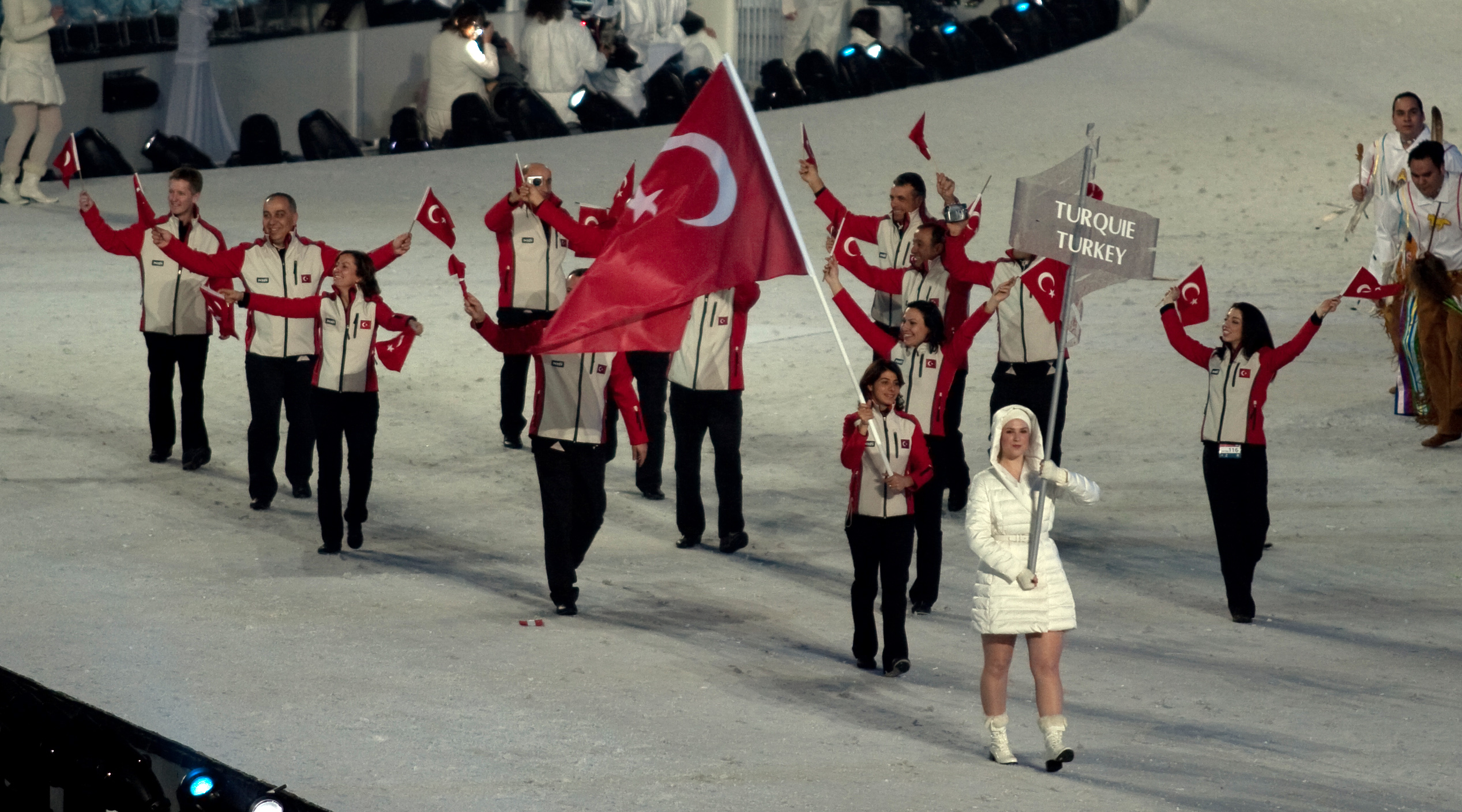
The athletes entering the stadium during the opening ceremonies.

Women

Athlete	Event	Run 1	Run 2	Total	Rank
Tuğba Daşdemir	Slalom	DNF	–	–	–
Tuğba Daşdemir	Giant slalom	1:28.37	1:25.10	2:53.47	56

== Cross-country skiing ==
Men

Athlete	Event	Time	Rank
Sabahattin Oğlago	15 km free	39:03.0	77

Women

Athlete	Event	Time	Rank
Kelime Çetinkaya	Sprint	4:22.32	53
Kelime Çetinkaya	10 km free	30:48.0	69
Kelime Çetinkaya	15 km pursuit	48:46.0	61

== Figure skating ==
Women

Athlete	Event	SP	FS	Total	Rank
Tuğba Karademir	Singles	50.74	78.80	129.54	24
