= Turkey at the 2014 Winter Olympics =

- IOC code: TUR
- NOC: Turkish National Olympic Committee
- Website: olimpiyat.org.tr (in English and Turkish)

in Sochi
- Competitors: 6 in 3 sports
- Flag bearers: Alper Uçar (opening); Tuğba Kocaağa (closing)
- Medals: Gold 0 Silver 0 Bronze 0 Total 0

Winter Olympics appearances (overview)
- 1936; 1948; 1952; 1956; 1960; 1964; 1968; 1972; 1976; 1980; 1984; 1988; 1992; 1994; 1998; 2002; 2006; 2010; 2014; 2018; 2022; 2026

Turkey competed at the 2014 Winter Olympics in Sochi, Russia from 7 to 23 February 2014. Turkey's team consists of six athletes in three sports.

The 2014 Games marked the first time a Turkish Olympic team competed in Russia, as Turkey and 64 western countries took part at the American-led boycott in the 1980 Summer Olympics held in Moscow due to the Soviet–Afghan War.

== Competitors ==
Sport	Men	Women	Total
Alpine skiing	1	1	2
Cross-country skiing	1	1	2
Figure skating	1	1	2
Total	3	3	6

== Alpine skiing ==
According to the quota allocation released on January 20, 2014, Turkey has qualified two athletes.

Athlete	Event	Run 1		Run 2		Total	
Athlete	Event	Time	Rank	Time	Rank	Time	Rank
Emre Şimşek	Men's giant slalom	1:40.26	76	1:37.38	67	3:17.64	68
Emre Şimşek	Men's slalom	DNF					
Tuğba Kocaağa	Women's giant slalom	1:36.04	70	1:33.76	59	3:09.80	63
Tuğba Kocaağa	Women's slalom	1:06.22	51	1:02.74	40	2:08.96	41

== Cross-country skiing ==
According to the quota allocation released on January 20, 2014, Turkey has qualified two athletes.

Distance

Athlete	Event	Classical		Freestyle		Final		
Athlete	Event	Time	Rank	Time	Rank	Time	Deficit	Rank
Sabahattin Oğlago	Men's 15 km classical	—N/a				45:16.0	+6:46.3	71
Kelime Çetinkaya	Women's 10 km classical	—N/a				32:58.0	+4:40.2	53
Kelime Çetinkaya	Women's 15 km skiathlon	22:54.9	61	23:41.1	61	47:17.7	+8:44.1	61

Sprint

Athlete	Event	Qualification		Quarterfinal		Semifinal		Final	
Athlete	Event	Time	Rank	Time	Rank	Time	Rank	Time	Rank
Sabahattin Oğlago	Men's sprint	4:02.03	75	Did not advance					
Kelime Çetinkaya	Women's sprint	3:05.00	67	Did not advance					

== Figure skating ==
Turkey has qualified to compete in ice dancing for the first time.

Athlete	Event	OD		FD		Total	
Athlete	Event	Points	Rank	Points	Rank	Points	Rank
Alisa Agafonova / Alper Uçar	Ice dancing	49.84	22	Did not advance			
