= Arif Alaftargil =

Turkish alpine skier (born 1973)

Personal information
- Born: 27 October 1973 (age 52) Erzurum, Turkey

Sport
- Sport: Skiing

Arif Alaftargil (born 27 October 1973) is a Turkish retired alpine skier, who competed in slalom and giant slalom events.

== Early life ==
Arif Alaftargil was born in Erzurum, Turkey. He is a member of skier family. His father İlhami owned a ski equipment store at Palandöken Mountain, and his three brothers are skiers. His younger brother Atakan Alaftargil competed for Turkey at the 2002 Winter Olympics in Salt Lake City, USA.

== Career ==
Arif Alaftargil competed for Turkey at the 1998 Winter Olympics ranking at 29th place in the slalom event with his time of 2:25.09.

Olympic Games
Preceded by Mithat Yıldırım	Flagbearer for Turkey; Nagano 1998	Succeeded by Atakan Alaftargil
