= Turkey at the 1988 Winter Olympics =

- IOC code: TUR
- NOC: Turkish National Olympic Committee
- Website: olimpiyat.org.tr (in English and Turkish)

in Calgary
- Competitors: 8 (men) in 2 sports
- Flag bearer: Abdullah Yılmaz (cross-country skiing)
- Medals: Gold 0 Silver 0 Bronze 0 Total 0

Winter Olympics appearances (overview)
- 1936; 1948; 1952; 1956; 1960; 1964; 1968; 1972; 1976; 1980; 1984; 1988; 1992; 1994; 1998; 2002; 2006; 2010; 2014; 2018; 2022; 2026

Turkey competed at the 1988 Winter Olympics in Calgary, Alberta, Canada.

== Competitors ==
The following is the list of number of competitors in the Games.

Sport	Men	Women	Total
Alpine skiing	4	0	4
Cross-country skiing	4	0	4
Total	8	0	8

== Alpine skiing ==
Men

Athlete	Event	Race 1	Race 2	Total	
Athlete	Event	Time	Time	Time	Rank
Göksay Demirhan	Super-G			2:02.22	47
Yakup Kadri Birinci	Super-G			1:59.32	44
Resul Sare	Super-G			1:57.65	43
Yakup Kadri Birinci	Giant Slalom	DNF	–	DNF	–
Ahmet Demir	Giant Slalom	1:23.29	1:20.45	2:43.74	59
Resul Sare	Giant Slalom	1:20.04	1:17.36	2:37.40	55
Göksay Demirhan	Giant Slalom	1:18.82	1:16.74	2:35.56	53
Resul Sare	Slalom	1:14.78	1:01.81	2:16.59	33
Göksay Demirhan	Slalom	1:13.22	1:04.89	2:18.21	36
Ahmet Demir	Slalom	1:11.29	1:06.24	2:17.53	35
Yakup Kadri Birinci	Slalom	1:09.08	1:02.11	2:11.19	31

== Cross-country skiing ==
Men

Event	Athlete	Race	
Event	Athlete	Time	Rank
15 km C	Erhan Dursun	52:18.3	79
15 km C	Fikret Ören	52:05.1	78
15 km C	Abdullah Yılmaz	51:54.6	77
15 km C	Saim Koca	51:36.6	76
30 km C	Erhan Dursun	1'56:10.7	84
30 km C	Fikret Ören	1'49:30.2	81
30 km C	Abdullah Yılmaz	1'46:48.2	79
30 km C	Saim Koca	1'44:55.7	78

C = Classical style, F = Freestyle
