= Turkey at the 1956 Winter Olympics =

- IOC code: TUR
- NOC: Turkish National Olympic Committee
- Website: olimpiyat.org.tr (in English and Turkish)

in Cortina d'Ampezzo
- Competitors: 4 (men) in 1 sport
- Medals: Gold 0 Silver 0 Bronze 0 Total 0

Winter Olympics appearances (overview)
- 1936; 1948; 1952; 1956; 1960; 1964; 1968; 1972; 1976; 1980; 1984; 1988; 1992; 1994; 1998; 2002; 2006; 2010; 2014; 2018; 2022; 2026

Turkey competed at the 1956 Winter Olympics in Cortina d'Ampezzo, Italy.

== Alpine skiing ==
Men

Athlete	Event	Race 1		Race 2		Total	
Athlete	Event	Time	Rank	Time	Rank	Time	Rank
Osman Yüce	Downhill					DSQ	–
Muzaffer Demirhan	Downhill					3:52.2	33
Mahmut Eroğlu	Giant Slalom					DSQ	–
Zeki Şamiloğlu	Giant Slalom					4:16.6	77
Osman Yüce	Giant Slalom					3:59.4	63
Muzaffer Demirhan	Giant Slalom					3:44.2	49
Zeki Şamiloğlu	Slalom	DSQ	–	–	–	DSQ	–
Mahmut Eroğlu	Slalom	DSQ	–	–	–	DSQ	–
Muzaffer Demirhan	Slalom	DSQ	–	–	–	DSQ	–
Osman Yüce	Slalom	DSQ	–	–	–	DSQ	–
