= Turkey at the 1968 Winter Olympics =

- IOC code: TUR
- NOC: Turkish National Olympic Committee
- Website: olimpiyat.org.tr (in English and Turkish)

in Grenoble
- Competitors: 11 (men) in 2 sports
- Medals: Gold 0 Silver 0 Bronze 0 Total 0

Winter Olympics appearances (overview)
- 1936; 1948; 1952; 1956; 1960; 1964; 1968; 1972; 1976; 1980; 1984; 1988; 1992; 1994; 1998; 2002; 2006; 2010; 2014; 2018; 2022; 2026

Turkey competed at the 1968 Winter Olympics in Grenoble, France.

== Competitors ==
Sport	Men	Women	Total
Alpine skiing	7	0	7
Cross-country skiing	4	0	4
Total	11	0	11

== Alpine skiing ==
Men

Athlete	Event	Race 1		Race 2		Total	
Athlete	Event	Time	Rank	Time	Rank	Time	Rank
Mehmet Gökcan	Downhill					DNF	–
Bahattin Topal	Downhill					DNF	–
Özer Ateşçi	Downhill					2:25.18	67
Mehmet Yıldırım	Downhill					2:40.79	71
Özer Ateşçi	Giant Slalom	DSQ	–	–	–	DSQ	–
Zeki Erylıdırım	Giant Slalom	2:37.07	91	2:29.72	88	5:06.79	87
Mehmet Yıldırım	Giant Slalom	2:23.15	88	2:23.71	85	4:46.86	84
Ahmet Kıbıl	Giant Slalom	2:19.69	86	2:20.54	82	4:40.23	82

Men's slalom

Athlete	Heat 1		Heat 2		Final					
Athlete	Time	Rank	Time	Rank	Time 1	Rank	Time 2	Rank	Total	Rank
Burhan Alankuş	DNF	–	did not advance							
Özer Ateşçi	1:10.58	1	1:14.83	4	did not advance					
Mehmet Yıldırım	1:05.31	5	1:02.39	4	did not advance					
Ahmet Kıbıl	DSQ	–	1:04.52	3	did not advance					

== Cross-country skiing ==
Men

Event	Athlete	Race	
Event	Athlete	Time	Rank
15 km	Yaşar Ören	1'09:03.8	72
15 km	Naci Öğün	1'05:56.4	71
15 km	Rızvan Özbey	1'05:02.3	70
15 km	Şeref Çınar (Note: also competed at the 1976 Winter Olympics)	1'04:12.2	69

Men's 4 × 10 km relay

Athletes	Race	
Athletes	Time	Rank
Rızvan Özbey; Yaşar Ören; Şeref Çınar; Naci Öğün	3'01:52.1	15
