= Turkey at the 2026 Winter Olympics =

- Flag of Turkey
- IOC code: TUR
- NOC: Turkish Olympic Committee
- Website: www.olimpiyat.org.tr

in Milan and Cortina d'Ampezzo, Italy 6 February 2026 – 22 February 2026
- Competitors: 8 (6 men and 2 women) in 4 sports
- Flag bearers (opening): Furkan Akar & İrem Dursun
- Flag bearer (closing): Volunteer
- Medals: Gold 0 Silver 0 Bronze 0 Total 0

Winter Olympics appearances (overview)
- 1936; 1948; 1952; 1956; 1960; 1964; 1968; 1972; 1976; 1980; 1984; 1988; 1992; 1994; 1998; 2002; 2006; 2010; 2014; 2018; 2022; 2026

Turkey, officially named Türkiye by the IOC, competed at the 2026 Winter Olympics in Milan and Cortina d'Ampezzo, Italy, from 6 to 22 February 2026.

Furkan Akar and İrem Dursun were the country's flagbearer during the opening ceremony. Meanwhile, a volunteer was the country's flagbearer during the closing ceremony.

== Competitors ==
The following is the list of number of competitors participating at the Games per sport/discipline.

Sport	Men	Women	Total
Alpine skiing	1	1	2
Cross-country skiing	1	1	2
Short-track speed skating	2	0	2
Ski jumping	2	0	2
Total	6	2	8

== Alpine skiing ==
Turkey qualified one male and one female alpine skier through the basic quota.

Athlete	Event	Run 1		Run 2		Total	
Athlete	Event	Time	Rank	Time	Rank	Time	Rank
Thomas Kaan Önol Lang	Men's giant slalom	1:25.67	53	1:18.83	49	2:44.50	49
Thomas Kaan Önol Lang	Men's slalom	DNF					
Ada Hasırcı	Women's slalom	DNF					

== Cross-country skiing ==
Turkey qualified one male and one female cross-country skier through the basic quota.

Distance

Athlete	Event	Final		
Athlete	Event	Time	Deficit	Rank
Abdullah Yılmaz	Men's 10 km freestyle	27:08.3	6:32.1	100
İrem Dursun	Women's 10 km freestyle	31:26.8	+8:37.6	103

Sprint

Athlete	Event	Qualification		Quarterfinal		Semifinal		Final	
Athlete	Event	Time	Rank	Time	Rank	Time	Rank	Time	Rank
Abdullah Yılmaz	Men's sprint	3:40.34	80	Did not advance					

== Short-track speed skating ==
Turkey qualified two male short-track speed skaters after the conclusion of the 2025–26 ISU Short Track World Tour.

Athlete	Event	Heat		Quarterfinal		Semifinal		Final	
Athlete	Event	Time	Rank	Time	Rank	Time	Rank	Time	Rank
Furkan Akar	Men's 500 m	PEN		Did not advance					
Denis Örs	Men's 500 m	44.651	3 ADV	41.532	5	Did not advance			

== Ski jumping ==
Turkey qualified two male ski jumpers.

Athlete	Event	First round			Final round			Total	
Athlete	Event	Distance	Points	Rank	Distance	Points	Rank	Points	Rank
Muhammed Ali Bedir	Men's normal hill	87.0	93.1	48	Did not advance				
Muhammed Ali Bedir	Men's large hill	110.0	80.3	48	Did not advance				
Fatih Arda İpcioğlu	Men's normal hill	98.0	111.1	44	Did not advance				
Fatih Arda İpcioğlu	Men's large hill	127.5	115.0	37	Did not advance				

Athlete	Event	First round			Second round			Final round			Total	
Athlete	Event	Distance	Points	Rank	Distance	Points	Rank	Distance	Points	Rank	Points	Rank
Muhammed Ali Bedir; Fatih Arda İpcioğlu	Super team large hill	237.0	202.7	15	Did not advance							

== See also ==
- Turkey at the 2026 Winter Paralympics
