= Maenza (surname) =

Maenza is a surname. Notable people with the surname include:

- Ernestina Maenza (1909–1995), Spanish alpine skier
- Vincenzo Maenza (born 1962), Italian Greco-Roman wrestler

== See also ==
- Maenza
