= Turkey at the 1976 Winter Olympics =

- IOC code: TUR
- NOC: Turkish National Olympic Committee
- Website: olimpiyat.org.tr (in English and Turkish)

in Innsbruck
- Competitors: 9 (men) in 2 sports
- Medals: Gold 0 Silver 0 Bronze 0 Total 0

Winter Olympics appearances (overview)
- 1936; 1948; 1952; 1956; 1960; 1964; 1968; 1972; 1976; 1980; 1984; 1988; 1992; 1994; 1998; 2002; 2006; 2010; 2014; 2018; 2022; 2026

Turkey competed at the 1976 Winter Olympics in Innsbruck, Austria.

== Competitors ==
Sport	Men	Women	Total
Alpine skiing	4	0	4
Cross-country skiing	5	0	5
Total	9	0	9

== Alpine skiing ==
Men

Athlete	Event	Race 1		Race 2		Total	
Athlete	Event	Time	Rank	Time	Rank	Time	Rank
Mümtaz Demirhan	Downhill					2:06.01	64
Ahmet Kıbıl	Downhill					2:03.74	63
Ahmet Kıbıl	Giant Slalom	DNF	–	–	–	DNF	–
Ersin Ayrıksa	Giant Slalom	DNF	–	–	–	DNF	–
Murat Tosun	Giant Slalom	2:17.99	79	DNF	–	DNF	–
Mümtaz Demirhan	Giant Slalom	2:17.58	78	DNF	–	DNF	–
Ahmet Kıbıl	Slalom	DNF	–	–	–	DNF	–
Murat Tosun	Slalom	DNF	–	–	–	DNF	–
Ersin Ayrıksa	Slalom	1:22.60	43	1:29.18	37	2:51.78	37

== Cross-country skiing ==
Men

Event	Athlete	Race	
Event	Athlete	Time	Rank
15 km	Yavuz Özbey	55:47.55	72
15 km	Şeref Çınar (Note: also competed at the 1968 Winter Olympics)	52:50.67	70
15 km	Sacit Özbey	52:15.41	66
15 km	Bahri Yılmaz	51:57.08	64
30 km	Ahmet Ünal	1'51:14.75	66
30 km	Bahri Yılmaz	1'45:15.78	62

Men's 4 × 10 km relay

Athletes	Race	
Athletes	Time	Rank
Sacit Özbey; Bahri Yılmaz; Şeref Çınar; Yavuz Özbey	DNF	–
