= Jesús Suárez =

Jesús Suárez may refer to:

- Jesús Suárez (skier) (1912–1997), Spanish cross-country skier
- Jesús Suárez Cueva (born 1955), Spanish racing cyclist
