= Turkey at the 1992 Winter Olympics =

- IOC code: TUR
- NOC: Turkish National Olympic Committee
- Website: olimpiyat.org.tr (in English and Turkish)

in Albertville
- Competitors: 8 (men) in 2 sports
- Medals: Gold 0 Silver 0 Bronze 0 Total 0

Winter Olympics appearances (overview)
- 1936; 1948; 1952; 1956; 1960; 1964; 1968; 1972; 1976; 1980; 1984; 1988; 1992; 1994; 1998; 2002; 2006; 2010; 2014; 2018; 2022; 2026

Turkey was represented at the 1992 Winter Olympics in Albertville, France by the Turkish National Olympic Committee.

In total, eight athletes – all men – represented Turkey in two different sports including alpine skiing and cross-country skiing.

== Competitors ==
In total, eight athletes represented Turkey at the 1992 Winter Olympics in Albertville, France across two different sports.

Sport	Men	Women	Total
Alpine skiing	4	0	4
Cross-country skiing	4	0	4
Total	8	0	8

== Alpine skiing ==
In total, four Turkish athletes participated in the alpine skiing events – Yakup Kadri Birinci, Cevdet Can, Ahmet Demir and Taner Üstündağ.

The men's super-G took place on 16 February 1992. Üstündağ completed the course in a time of one minute 28.24 seconds to finish 77th overall. Birinci completed the course in a time of one minute 30.4 seconds to finish 82nd overall. Can completed the course in a time of one minute 37.97 seconds to finish 88th overall. Demir did not finish.

The men's giant slalom took place on 18 February 1992. Üstündağ completed his first run in a time of one minute 20.44 seconds and his second run in a time of one minute 18.51 seconds. His combined time of two minutes 38.95 seconds saw him finish 60th overall. Demir completed his first run in a time of one minute 23 seconds and his second run in a time of one minute 22.26 seconds. His combined time of two minutes 45.26 seconds saw him finish joint 67th overall. Can completed his first run in a time of one minute 23.62 seconds and his second run in a time of one minute 22.78 seconds. His combined time of two minutes 46.4 seconds saw him finish 70th overall. Birinci completed his first run in a time of one minute 24.73 seconds and his second run in a time of one minute 23.39 seconds. His combined time of two minutes 48.12 seconds saw him finish 75th overall.

The men's slalom took place on 22 February 1992. Üstündağ completed his first run in a time of one minute 9.13 seconds and his second run in a time of one minute 8.65 seconds. His combined time of two minutes 17.78 seconds saw him finish 45th overall. Can completed his first run in a time of one minute 15.21 seconds and his second run in a time of one minute 13.24 seconds. His combined time of two minutes 28.45 seconds saw him finish 51st overall. Demir did not finish his first run. Birinci did not start.

Men

Athlete	Event	Race 1	Race 2	Total	
Athlete	Event	Time	Time	Time	Rank
Ahmet Demir	Super-G			DNF	–
Cevdet Can	Super-G			1:37.97	88
Yakup Kadri Birinci	Super-G			1:30.40	82
Taner Üstündağ	Super-G			1:28.24	77
Yakup Kadri Birinci	Giant Slalom	1:24.73	1:23.39	2:48.12	75
Cevdet Can	Giant Slalom	1:23.62	1:22.78	2:46.40	70
Ahmet Demir	Giant Slalom	1:23.00	1:22.26	2:45.26	67
Taner Üstündağ	Giant Slalom	1:20.44	1:18.51	2:38.95	60
Ahmet Demir	Slalom	DNF	–	DNF	–
Cevdet Can	Slalom	1:15.21	1:13.24	2:28.45	51
Taner Üstündağ	Slalom	1:09.13	1:08.65	2:17.78	45

== Cross-country skiing ==
In total, four Turkish athletes participated in the cross-country skiing events – Fikret Ören, Celal Şener, Mithat Yıldırım and Abdullah Yılmaz.

The men's 10 km classical took place on 13 February 1992. Yıldırım completed the course in a time of 36 minutes 36.8 seconds to finish 93rd overall. Ören completed the course in a time of 37 minutes 3.7 seconds to finish 96th overall. Yılmaz completed the course in a time of 38 minutes 22.1 seconds to finish 102nd overall. Şener completed the course in a time of 38 minutes 25.4 seconds to finish 103rd overall.

The men's 15 km freestyle pursuit took place on 13 February 1992. Ören completed the course in a time of 54 minutes 40.1 seconds to finish 83rd overall. Şener completed the course in a time of 57 minutes 47.5 seconds to finish 90th overall. Yıldırım and Yılmaz did not start.

Men

Event	Athlete	Race	
Event	Athlete	Time	Rank
10 km C	Celal Şener	38:25.4	103
10 km C	Abdullah Yılmaz	38:22.1	102
10 km C	Fikret Ören	37:03.7	96
10 km C	Mithat Yıldırım	36:36.8	93
15 km pursuit^{1} F	Celal Şener	57:47.5	90
15 km pursuit^{1} F	Fikret Ören	54:40.1	83

^{1} Starting delay based on 10 km results.
C = Classical style, F = Freestyle
