= Adolf Freiburghaus =

Swiss cross-country skier

Personal information
- Nationality: Swiss
- Born: 27 March 1910
- Died: 20 April 1974 (aged 64); Geneva, Switzerland

Sport
- Sport: Cross-country skiing

Adolf "Dolfi" Freiburghaus (27 March 1910 – 20 April 1974) was a Swiss cross-country skier. He competed in the men's 18 kilometre event at the 1936 Winter Olympics.
