= Cross-country skiing at the 1936 Winter Olympics – Men's 18 kilometre =

Men's 18 kilometres at the IV Olympic Winter Games
- Date: February 12, 1936
- Competitors: 75 from 22 nations
- Winning time: 1:14:38

Medalists
1st place, gold medalist(s)		Erik August Larsson	Sweden
2nd place, silver medalist(s)		Oddbjørn Hagen	Norway
3rd place, bronze medalist(s)		Pekka Niemi	Finland

The 18 kilometre cross-country skiing event was part of the cross-country skiing at the 1936 Winter Olympics programme. It was the fourth appearance of the event. The competition was held on Wednesday, 12 February 1936. Seventy-five cross-country skiers from 22 nations competed.

== Medalists ==
Gold	Silver	Bronze
Erik August Larsson; Sweden	Oddbjørn Hagen; Norway	Pekka Niemi; Finland

== Results ==
Place	Competitor	Time
1	Erik August Larsson (SWE)	1'14:38
2	Oddbjørn Hagen (NOR)	1'15:33
3	Pekka Niemi (FIN)	1'16:59
4	Martin Matsbo (SWE)	1'17:02
5	Olaf Hoffsbakken (NOR)	1'17:37
6	Arne Rustadstuen (NOR)	1'18:13
7	Sulo Nurmela (FIN)	1'18:55
8	Arthur Häggblad (SWE)	1'18:55
9	Bjarne Iversen (NOR)	1'18:56
10	Lukáš Mihalák (TCH)	1'19:01
11	František Šimůnek (TCH)	1'19:09
12	Kalle Jalkanen (FIN)	1'19:27
13	Vincenzo Demetz (ITA)	1'20:06
14	Cyril Musil (TCH)	1'20:14
15	Matti Lähde (FIN)	1'20:21
16	Severino Menardi (ITA)	1'20:34
17	Ivan Lindgren (SWE)	1'21:04
18	Walter Motz (GER)	1'21:20
19	Giulio Gerardi (ITA)	1'21:25
20	Georg von Kaufmann (GER)	1'22:39
21	Gustl Berauer (TCH)	1'23:04
22	Michał Górski (POL)	1'23:11
23	Alojz Klančnik (YUG)	1'23:18
24	Robert Gindre (FRA)	1'23:48
25	Franc Smolej (YUG)	1'24:03
26	August Sonderegger (SUI)	1'24:27
27	Toni Zeller (GER)	1'24:32
28	Harald Bosio (AUT)	1'24:39
29	Friedl Däuber (GER)	1'24:57
30	Vello Kaaristo (EST)	1'25:11
31	Willy Bernath (SUI)	1'25:12
32	Marian Woyna-Orlewicz (POL)	1'25:27
33	Bronisław Czech (POL)	1'25:55
34	Karl Satre (USA)	1'25:56
35	Léonce Crétin (FRA)	1'26:11
36	Hans Jamnig (AUT)	1'26:20
37	Fernand Mermoud (FRA)	1'26:31
38	Avgust Jakopič (YUG)	1'26:48
39	Alfred Rössner (AUT)	1'27:05
40	Adolf Freiburghaus (SUI)	1'27:08
41	Erich Gallwitz (AUT)	1'27:28
42	Stanisław Karpiel (POL)	1'25:27
43	Alfred Jacomis (FRA)	1'27:49
44	Leon Knap (YUG)	1'28:31
45	Birger Torrissen (USA)	1'29:08
46	Richard E. Parsons (USA)	1'30:09
47	William Clark (CAN)	1'30:20
48	Warren Chivers (USA)	1'30:25
49	Shinzo Yamada (JPN)	1'31:28
50	Pauls Kaņeps (LAT)	1'31:44
51	Eduard Müller (SUI)	1'32:04
52	Raffaele Nasi (ITA)	1'32:12
53	Hristo Kochov (BUL)	1'32:30
54	William Ball (CAN)	1'32:46
55	Tsutomu Sekido (JPN)	1'32:48
56	Ginzo Yamada (JPN)	1'33:17
57	Tormod Mobraaten (CAN)	1'33:28
58	Herberts Dāboliņš (LAT)	1'34:20
59	Hiroshi Tadano (JPN)	1'35:28
60	Ioan Coman (ROU)	1'36:21
61	Iosif Covaci (ROU)	1'37:23
62	Tomás Velasco (ESP)	1'37:25
63	Jesús Suárez (ESP)	1'39:12
64	Karl Baadsvik (CAN)	1'39:30
65	José Canals (ESP)	1'40:14
66	Ivan Angelakov (BUL)	1'41:44
67	Alberts Riekstiņš (LAT)	1'42:16
68	Dimitar Kostov (BUL)	1'42:22
69	Kārlis Bukass (LAT)	1'42:58
70	Racho Zhekov (BUL)	1'43:11
71	Francis Walter (GBR)	1'44:13
72	Mahmut Şevket (TUR)	2'09:36
–	Dimitris Negropontis (GRE)	DNF
–	Cemal Tiğin (TUR)	DNF
–	Enrique Millán (ESP)	DNF
