= Duygu Ulusoy =

Turkish alpine skier (born 1987)

Duygu Ulusoy (a.k.a. Duygu Gül Ulusoy; born April 24, 1987, in Garmisch-Partenkirchen, West Germany), is a female Turkish skier competing in the alpine discipline. She represented Turkey at the 2006 Winter Olympics in Turin, Italy, becoming the first female Turkish Alpine skier in the Olympic Games.

Duygu, born to a Turkish family living in Germany, started skiing in her age of six. She attended ski courses for three years in her hometown Garmisch-Partenkirchen, and drew soon her trainer’s attention with her talent. In her short sports career, she received more than 30 medals in her age’s categories of skiing.

In summer 2004, she decided to compete for Turkey after her club in Germany demoted her following an ankle injury. During a summer holiday in Darboğaz, Niğde in Turkey, where her parents come from, she used the chance to apply for the Turkish national ski team, and was accepted immediately in reference to her 40th place in the world rank with 85 FIS points in slalom and 93 FIS points in giant slalom.

In her first race in Turkey, Ulusoy received gold medal in the juniors’ category at the Turkey Ski Championships. Her only concern is to be alone in Turkey during the camps, however she hopes her family will be returning to Turkey soon.

She participated at the 2006 Winter Olympics as the only female skier in the Turkish alpine ski team.
