= İrem Dursun =

Turkish cross-country skier (born 2005)

Personal information
- Nationality: Turkey
- Born: 26 August 2005 (age 21) Bolu, Turkey

Sport
- Sport: Cross-country skiing

İrem Dursun (born 26 August 2005) is a Turkish female Olympian cross-country skier.

== Sport career ==
Dursun started her cross-country skiing in December 2020 competing in the 5 km intervall start class.

=== 2021 ===
In 2021, she continued to compete in 5 km distance in start class and freestyle placing four to six. In February 2021, she debuted internationally taking part at the FIS Junior World Ski Championships.in Vuokatti, Finland, where she competed in the 1.1 km Sprint Final Classic, 5 km Freestyle and 4x3.3 km Relay Classic Free events. One week later, she competed in the 2021 Balkan Cup in Dvorista - Pale, Pale, Bosnia and Herzegovina in the 5 km Freestyle.

=== 2023 ===
In January 2023, she participated at the European Youth Olympic Winter Festival in Sappada, Italy competing in the 5 km Interval Start Free, 7.5 km Intervall Start Classic, 1.2 km Sprint Final Classic and Mixed 4x5 km Relay Classic/Free events.

=== 2024 ===
In February 2024, she won her first international medal in the 1.2 km Sprint Final Free event, in silver, at the 2024 FIS Tournament in Cedars, Lebanon.

=== 2025 ===
In September 2025, she competed in the 5 km Interval Start Classic and Free events at the Roller Ski in Predeal-Rasnov , Romania. In December 2025, sje took part at the FESA Cup in Planica, Slovenia competing in the 1.3 km Sprint Final Free, 10 km Interval Start Classic and Free events. One week later, she competed in the 1.2 Sprint Final Free and Classic events in the Seefeld Nordic Competence Centre, Germany. In 2025, she placed third at the Turkish Inter-University Cross-country Skiing Championship in Erzurum.

=== 2026 ===
She is to represent her country in the 10 km freestyle event of cross-country skiing at the 2026 Winter Olympics in Milan, Italy.

== Personal life ==
Dursun was born in Bolu, Turkey on 26 August 2005.

As of 2026, she is a student of sports coaching in the Sports Science Faculty of Bolu Abant İzzet Baysal University.

Olympic Games
Preceded by Ayşenur Duman	Flagbearer for Turkey; Milan-Cortina 2026 with Furkan Akar	Succeeded by Incumbent
