= Ayşenur Duman =

Turkish cross-country skier (born 1999)

Personal information
- Nationality: Turkey
- Born: 1 March 1999 (age 27) Peçenek village, Çamlıdere, Ankara Province, Turkey
- Height: 156 cm (5 ft 1 in)

Sport
- Sport: Skiing
- Club: Esentepe Sports Club

Ayşenur Duman (born 1 March 1999) is a Turkish female Olympian cross-country skier.

== Early life ==
Ayşenur Duman was born in Peçenek village of Çamlıdere district of Ankara Province, Turkey. She lives in Gerede, Bolu Province.

She is a student of Physical Education at Abant Izzet Baysal University in Bolu.

== Career ==
Duman began skiing at the age of ten encouraged by her physical education teacher. In Gerede, where she now lives, she found opportunity to exercise in a training camp center for skiing. She performs diverse exercises daily for 1.5 – 3 hours, and does cross-country skiing for 20–30 km (12–19 mi) a day.

She was admitted to the national team in 2014. As of 2018, she has a participation record of 65 international competitions with 19 medals won. She is coached by the Turkish female cross-country skier Kelime Çetinkaya, who competed four times in Winter Olympic Games.

Duman took part at the Cross-Country Skiing Balkan Cup held in Ravna Gora, Croatia on 27–28 February 2016, and won the bronze medal in the women's 5 km freestyle event and the silver medal in the women's 10 km freestyle event. She participated at the 2017 European Youth Olympic Winter Festival held in Erzurum, Turkey. She ranked within the first ten, the best success ever for Turkey in that sport discipline. She won a bronze medal at the International Roller Skiing Championships held in Metsovo, Greece on 1–3 September 2017.

Duman was qualified to take part at the Cross-country skiing at the 2018 Winter Olympics in Pyeongchang County, South Korea.

She was named flagbearer along with Furkan Akar at the opening ceremony of the 2022 Winter Olympics in Beijing, China.

== See also ==
- Turkey at the 2018 Winter Olympics
- Turkey at the 2022 Winter Olympics

Olympic Games
Preceded by Fatih Arda İpcioğlu	Flagbearer for Turkey; Beijing 2022 with Furkan Akar	Succeeded by Incumbent
