= Eduard Müller (cross-country skier) =

Swiss cross-country skier

Personal information
- Nationality: Swiss
- Born: 8 January 1912
- Died: 1969 (aged 56–57)

Sport
- Sport: Cross-country skiing

Eduard Müller (8 January 1912 – 1969) was a Swiss cross-country skier. He competed in the men's 18 kilometre event at the 1936 Winter Olympics.
