= Turkey at the Olympics =

- IOC code: TUR
- NOC: Turkish National Olympic Committee
- Website: www.olimpiyatkomitesi.org.tr (in English and Turkish)
- Medals Ranked 31st: Gold 41 Silver 29 Bronze 41 Total 111

Summer appearances
- 1908; 1912; 1920; 1924; 1928; 1932; 1936; 1948; 1952; 1956; 1960; 1964; 1968; 1972; 1976; 1980; 1984; 1988; 1992; 1996; 2000; 2004; 2008; 2012; 2016; 2020; 2024; 2028

Winter appearances
- 1936; 1948; 1952; 1956; 1960; 1964; 1968; 1972; 1976; 1980; 1984; 1988; 1992; 1994; 1998; 2002; 2006; 2010; 2014; 2018; 2022; 2026

Other related appearances
- 1906 Intercalated Games

Turkey, officially named Türkiye by the IOC, after the Ottoman Empire, first participated at the Olympic Games in 1908 and has sent athletes to compete in most editions of the Summer Olympic Games since then, except the 1920 Summer Olympics in Antwerp because of the sanction against the Central Powers including the Ottoman Empire, the 1932 Summer Olympics in Los Angeles at the period of worldwide Great Depression, and the 1980 Summer Olympics in Moscow because of its support for the United States-led boycott. Turkey has also participated in most Winter Olympic Games since their first appearance in 1936. Turkish athletes have won a total of 111 medals, divided into 41 golds, 29 silvers and 41 bronzes. Turkey won the most medals in wrestling. The National Olympic Committee for Turkey, Turkish National Olympic Committee was created in 1908 and recognized in 1911.

== Medal tables ==
=== Medals by Summer Games ===
Games	Athletes	Gold	Silver	Bronze	Total	Rank
1908 London	1	0	0	0	0	–
1912 Stockholm	2	0	0	0	0	–
1920 Antwerp	did not participate					
1924 Paris	21	0	0	0	0	–
1928 Amsterdam	32	0	0	0	0	–
1932 Los Angeles	did not participate					
1936 Berlin	48	1	0	1	2	19
1948 London	58	6	4	2	12	7
1952 Helsinki	51	2	0	1	3	16
1956 Melbourne	19	3	2	2	7	12
1960 Rome	49	7	2	0	9	6
1964 Tokyo	23	2	3	1	6	16
1968 Mexico City	29	2	0	0	2	21
1972 Munich	43	0	1	0	1	33
1976 Montreal	27	0	0	0	0	–
1980 Moscow	boycotted					
1984 Los Angeles	46	0	0	3	3	40
1988 Seoul	41	1	1	0	2	27
1992 Barcelona	47	2	2	2	6	23
1996 Atlanta	53	4	1	1	6	19
2000 Sydney	57	3	0	2	5	26
2004 Athens	65	3	3	4	10	22
2008 Beijing	67	1	1	3	5	42
2012 London	114	1	1	1	3	46
2016 Rio de Janeiro	103	1	3	4	8	41
2020 Tokyo	108	2	2	9	13	35
2024 Paris	101	0	3	5	8	64
2028 Los Angeles	future event					
2032 Brisbane	future event					
Total (24/30)	1,205	41	29	41	111	31

=== Medals by Winter Games ===
Games	Athletes	Gold	Silver	Bronze	Total	Rank
1936 Garmisch-Partenkirchen	6	0	0	0	0	–
1948 St. Moritz	4	0	0	0	0	–
1952 Oslo	did not participate					
1956 Cortina d'Ampezzo	4	0	0	0	0	–
1960 Squaw Valley	2	0	0	0	0	–
1964 Innsbruck	5	0	0	0	0	–
1968 Grenoble	11	0	0	0	0	–
1972 Sapporo	did not participate					
1976 Innsbruck	9	0	0	0	0	–
1980 Lake Placid	did not participate					
1984 Sarajevo	7	0	0	0	0	–
1988 Calgary	8	0	0	0	0	–
1992 Albertville	8	0	0	0	0	–
1994 Lillehammer	1	0	0	0	0	–
1998 Nagano	1	0	0	0	0	–
2002 Salt Lake City	3	0	0	0	0	–
2006 Turin	6	0	0	0	0	–
2010 Vancouver	5	0	0	0	0	–
2014 Sochi	6	0	0	0	0	–
2018 Pyeongchang	8	0	0	0	0	–
2022 Beijing	7	0	0	0	0	–
2026 Milano Cortina	8	0	0	0	0	–
2030 French Alps	future event					
2034 Utah	future event					
Total (18/24)	101	0	0	0	0	–

=== Medals by summer sport ===
Sport	Gold	Silver	Bronze	Total
Wrestling	29	18	21	68
Weightlifting	8	1	2	11
Boxing	1	5	4	10
Taekwondo	1	3	6	10
Archery	1	0	1	2
Judo	1	0	1	2
Karate	0	1	3	4
Shooting	0	1	0	1
Athletics	0	0	2	2
Gymnastics	0	0	1	1
Totals (10 entries)	41	29	41	111

== List of Medalists ==
Medal	Games	Name	Sport	Event
Gold	(Nazi Germany) 1936 Berlin	Yaşar Erkan	Wrestling	Men's Greco-Roman Featherweight
Bronze	(Nazi Germany) 1936 Berlin	Ahmet Kireççi	Wrestling	Men's Freestyle Middleweight
Gold	(United Kingdom) 1948 London	Nasuh Akar	Wrestling	Men's Freestyle 52 – 57 kg (bantamweight)
Gold	(United Kingdom) 1948 London	Gazanfer Bilge	Wrestling	Men's Freestyle 57 – 63 kg (featherweight)
Gold	(United Kingdom) 1948 London	Celal Atik	Wrestling	Men's Freestyle 63 – 67 kg (lightweight)
Gold	(United Kingdom) 1948 London	Yaşar Doğu	Wrestling	Men's Freestyle 67 – 73 kg (welterweight)
Gold	(United Kingdom) 1948 London	Ahmet Kireççi	Wrestling	Men's Greco-Roman + 87 kg (super heavyweight)
Gold	(United Kingdom) 1948 London	Mehmet Oktav	Wrestling	Men's Greco-Roman 57 – 61 kg (featherweight)
Silver	(United Kingdom) 1948 London	Halit Balamir	Wrestling	Men's Freestyle - 52 kg (flyweight)
Silver	(United Kingdom) 1948 London	Adil Candemir	Wrestling	Men's Freestyle 73 – 79 kg (middleweight)
Silver	(United Kingdom) 1948 London	Kenan Olcay	Wrestling	Men's Greco-Roman - 52 kg (flyweight)
Silver	(United Kingdom) 1948 London	Muhlis Tayfur	Wrestling	Men's Greco-Roman 73 – 79 kg (middleweight)
Bronze	(United Kingdom) 1948 London	Halil Kaya	Wrestling	Men's Greco-Roman 52 – 57 kg (bantamweight)
Bronze	(United Kingdom) 1948 London	Ruhi Sarıalp	Athletics	Men's Triple Jump
Gold	(Finland) 1952 Helsinki	Hasan Gemici	Wrestling	Men's Freestyle Flyweight
Gold	(Finland) 1952 Helsinki	Bayram Şit	Wrestling	Men's Freestyle Featherweight
Bronze	(Finland) 1952 Helsinki	Adil Atan	Wrestling	Men's Freestyle Light-Heavyweight
Gold	(Australia) 1956 Melbourne	Mithat Bayrak	Wrestling	Men's Greco-Roman Welterweight
Gold	(Australia) 1956 Melbourne	Mustafa Dağıstanlı	Wrestling	Freestyle Bantamweight
Gold	(Australia) 1956 Melbourne	Hamit Kaplan	Wrestling	Freestyle Heavyweight
Silver	(Australia) 1956 Melbourne	Rıza Doğan	Wrestling	Greco-Roman Lightweight
Silver	(Australia) 1956 Melbourne	İbrahim Zengin	Wrestling	Freestyle Welterweight
Bronze	(Australia) 1956 Melbourne	Dursun Ali Eğribaş	Wrestling	Greco-Roman Flyweight
Bronze	(Australia) 1956 Melbourne	Hüseyin Akbaş	Wrestling	Freestyle Flyweight
Gold	(Italy) 1960 Rome	Müzahir Sille	Wrestling	Men's Greco-Roman Featherweight
Gold	(Italy) 1960 Rome	Mithat Bayrak	Wrestling	Men's Greco-Roman Welterweight
Gold	(Italy) 1960 Rome	Tevfik Kış	Wrestling	Men's Greco-Roman Light Heavyweight
Gold	(Italy) 1960 Rome	Ahmet Bilek	Wrestling	Men's Freestyle Flyweight
Gold	(Italy) 1960 Rome	Mustafa Dağıstanlı	Wrestling	Freestyle Featherweight
Gold	(Italy) 1960 Rome	Hasan Güngör	Wrestling	Freestyle Middleweight
Gold	(Italy) 1960 Rome	İsmet Atlı	Wrestling	Freestyle Light Heavyweight
Silver	(Italy) 1960 Rome	İsmail Ogan	Wrestling	Freestyle Welterweight
Silver	(Italy) 1960 Rome	Hamit Kaplan	Wrestling	Freestyle Heavyweight
Gold	(Japan) 1964 Tokyo	Kazım Ayvaz	Wrestling	Men's Greco-Roman Lightweight
Gold	(Japan) 1964 Tokyo	İsmail Ogan	Wrestling	Men's Freestyle Welterweight
Silver	(Japan) 1964 Tokyo	Hüseyin Akbaş	Wrestling	Men's Freestyle Bantamweight
Silver	(Japan) 1964 Tokyo	Hasan Güngör	Wrestling	Men's Freestyle Middleweight
Silver	(Japan) 1964 Tokyo	Ahmet Ayık	Wrestling	Men's Freestyle Light Heavyweight
Bronze	(Japan) 1964 Tokyo	Hamit Kaplan	Wrestling	Men's Freestyle Heavyweight
Gold	1968 Mexico City	Mahmut Atalay	Wrestling	Men's Freestyle Welterweight
Gold	1968 Mexico City	Ahmet Ayık	Wrestling	Men's Freestyle Light Heavyweight
Silver	(Germany) 1972 Munich	Vehbi Akdağ	Wrestling	Men's freestyle 62 kg
Bronze	(United States) 1984 Los Angeles	Eyüp Can	Boxing	Men's Flyweight (51 kg)
Bronze	(United States) 1984 Los Angeles	Turgut Aykaç	Boxing	Men's Featherweight (57 kg)
Bronze	(United States) 1984 Los Angeles	Ayhan Taşkın	Wrestling	Men's freestyle +100 kg
Gold	(South Korea) 1988 Seoul	Naim Süleymanoğlu	Weightlifting	Men's 60 kg
Silver	(South Korea) 1988 Seoul	Necmi Gençalp	Wrestling	Men's freestyle 82 kg
Gold	(Spain) 1992 Barcelona	Naim Süleymanoğlu	Weightlifting	Men's 60 kg
Gold	(Spain) 1992 Barcelona	Akif Pirim	Wrestling	Men's Greco-Roman 62 kg
Silver	(Spain) 1992 Barcelona	Hakkı Başar	Wrestling	Men's Greco-Roman 90 kg
Silver	(Spain) 1992 Barcelona	Kenan Şimşek	Wrestling	Men's freestyle 90 kg
Bronze	(Spain) 1992 Barcelona	Hülya Şenyurt	Judo	Women's Extra Lightweight (48 kg)
Bronze	(Spain) 1992 Barcelona	Ali Kayalı	Wrestling	Men's freestyle 100 kg
Gold	(United States) 1996 Atlanta	Halil Mutlu	Weightlifting	Men's 54 kg
Gold	(United States) 1996 Atlanta	Naim Süleymanoğlu	Weightlifting	Men's 64 kg
Gold	(United States) 1996 Atlanta	Hamza Yerlikaya	Wrestling	Men's Greco-Roman 82 kg
Gold	(United States) 1996 Atlanta	Mahmut Demir	Wrestling	Men's Freestyle 130 kg
Silver	(United States) 1996 Atlanta	Malik Beyleroğlu	Boxing	Men's Middleweight
Bronze	(United States) 1996 Atlanta	Akif Pirim	Wrestling	Men's Greco-Roman 62 kg
Gold	(Australia) 2000 Sydney	Hüseyin Özkan	Judo	Men's 66 kg
Gold	(Australia) 2000 Sydney	Halil Mutlu	Weightlifting	Men's 56 kg
Gold	(Australia) 2000 Sydney	Hamza Yerlikaya	Wrestling	Men's Greco-Roman 85 kg
Bronze	(Australia) 2000 Sydney	Hamide Bıkçın	Taekwondo	Women's 57 kg
Bronze	(Australia) 2000 Sydney	Adem Bereket	Wrestling	Men's freestyle 76 kg
Gold	(Greece) 2004 Athens	Nurcan Taylan	Weightlifting	Women's 48 kg
Gold	(Greece) 2004 Athens	Halil Mutlu	Weightlifting	Men's 56 kg
Gold	(Greece) 2004 Athens	Taner Sağır	Weightlifting	Men's 77 kg
Silver	(Greece) 2004 Athens	Şeref Eroğlu	Wrestling	Men's Greco-Roman 66 kg
Silver	(Greece) 2004 Athens	Bahri Tanrıkulu	Taekwondo	Men's 80 kg
Silver	(Greece) 2004 Athens	Atagün Yalçınkaya	Boxing	Light flyweight
Bronze	(Greece) 2004 Athens	Sedat Artuç	Weightlifting	Men's 56 kg
Bronze	(Greece) 2004 Athens	Reyhan Arabacıoğlu	Weightlifting	Men's 77 kg
Bronze	(Greece) 2004 Athens	Mehmet Özal	Wrestling	Men's Greco-Roman 96 kg
Bronze	(Greece) 2004 Athens	Aydın Polatçı	Wrestling	Men's freestyle 120 kg
Gold	(China) 2008 Beijing	Ramazan Şahin	Wrestling	Men's freestyle 66 kg
Silver	(China) 2008 Beijing	Azize Tanrıkulu	Taekwondo	Women's 57 kg
Bronze	(China) 2008 Beijing	Yakup Kılıç	Boxing	Men's 57 kg
Bronze	(China) 2008 Beijing	Servet Tazegül	Taekwondo	Men's 68 kg
Bronze	(China) 2008 Beijing	Nazmi Avluca	Wrestling	Men's Greco-Roman 84 kg
Gold	(United Kingdom) 2012 London	Servet Tazegül	Taekwondo	Men's 68 kg
Silver	(United Kingdom) 2012 London	Nur Tatar	Taekwondo	Women's 67 kg
Bronze	(United Kingdom) 2012 London	Rıza Kayaalp	Wrestling	Men's Greco-Roman 120 kg
Gold	(Brazil) 2016 Rio de Janeiro	Taha Akgül	Wrestling	Men's freestyle 125 kg
Silver	(Brazil) 2016 Rio de Janeiro	Daniyar Ismayilov	Weightlifting	Men's 69 kg
Silver	(Brazil) 2016 Rio de Janeiro	Rıza Kayaalp	Wrestling	Men's Greco-Roman 130 kg
Silver	(Brazil) 2016 Rio de Janeiro	Selim Yaşar	Wrestling	Men's freestyle 86 kg
Bronze	(Brazil) 2016 Rio de Janeiro	Yasmani Copello	Athletics	Men's 400 metres hurdles
Bronze	(Brazil) 2016 Rio de Janeiro	Cenk İldem	Wrestling	Men's Greco-Roman 98 kg
Bronze	(Brazil) 2016 Rio de Janeiro	Soner Demirtaş	Wrestling	Men's freestyle 74 kg
Bronze	(Brazil) 2016 Rio de Janeiro	Nur Tatar	Taekwondo	Women's 67 kg
Gold	(Japan) 2020 Tokyo	Mete Gazoz	Archery	Men's individual
Gold	(Japan) 2020 Tokyo	Busenaz Sürmeneli	Boxing	Women's welterweight
Silver	(Japan) 2020 Tokyo	Buse Naz Çakıroğlu	Boxing	Women's flyweight
Silver	(Japan) 2020 Tokyo	Eray Şamdan	Karate	Men's 67 kg
Bronze	(Japan) 2020 Tokyo	Hakan Reçber	Taekwondo	Men's 68 kg
Bronze	(Japan) 2020 Tokyo	Hatice Kübra İlgün	Taekwondo	Women's 57 kg
Bronze	(Japan) 2020 Tokyo	Rıza Kayaalp	Wrestling	Men's Greco-Roman 130 kg
Bronze	(Japan) 2020 Tokyo	Yasemin Adar	Wrestling	Women's freestyle 76 kg
Bronze	(Japan) 2020 Tokyo	Ferhat Arıcan	Gymnastics	Men's parallel bars
Bronze	(Japan) 2020 Tokyo	Taha Akgül	Wrestling	Men's freestyle 125 kg
Bronze	(Japan) 2020 Tokyo	Ali Sofuoğlu	Karate	Men's kata
Bronze	(Japan) 2020 Tokyo	Merve Çoban	Karate	Women's 61 kg
Bronze	(Japan) 2020 Tokyo	Uğur Aktaş	Karate	Men's 75 kg
Silver	(France) 2024 Paris	Şevval İlayda Tarhan; Yusuf Dikeç	Shooting	Mixed 10 m air pistol team
Silver	(France) 2024 Paris	Hatice Akbaş	Boxing	Women's 54 kg
Silver	(France) 2024 Paris	Buse Naz Çakıroğlu	Boxing	Women's 50 kg
Bronze	(France) 2024 Paris	Mete Gazoz; Ulaş Tümer; Abdullah Yıldırmış	Archery	Men's team
Bronze	(France) 2024 Paris	Buse Tosun Çavuşoğlu	Wrestling	Women's freestyle 68 kg
Bronze	(France) 2024 Paris	Esra Yıldız	Boxing	Women's 57 kg
Bronze	(France) 2024 Paris	Taha Akgül	Wrestling	Men's freestyle 125 kg
Bronze	(France) 2024 Paris	Nafia Kuş	Taekwondo	Women's +67 kg

== Athletes with most medals ==
#	Athlete	Sport	Games	Gold medal	Silver medal	Bronze medal	Total
1	Naim Süleymanoğlu	Weightlifting	1988–2000	3	0	0	3
1	Halil Mutlu	Weightlifting	1996–2004	3	0	0	3
3	Mustafa Dağıstanlı	Wrestling	1956–1960	2	0	0	2
3	Mithat Bayrak	Wrestling	1956–1964	2	0	0	2
3	Hamza Yerlikaya	Wrestling	1996–2004	2	0	0	2
6	Hamit Kaplan	Wrestling	1956–1964	1	1	1	3
7	Hasan Güngör	Wrestling	1960–1964	1	1	0	2
7	İsmail Ogan	Wrestling	1960–1964	1	1	0	2
7	Ahmet Ayık	Wrestling	1964–1968	1	1	0	2
10	Taha Akgül	Wrestling	2012–2024	1	0	2	3
11	Ahmet Kireççi	Wrestling	1936–1948	1	0	1	2
11	Mehmet Akif Pirim	Wrestling	1992–1996	1	0	1	2
11	Servet Tazegül	Taekwondo	2008–2016	1	0	1	2
11	Mete Gazoz	Archery	2016–2024	1	0	1	2
15	Buse Naz Çakıroğlu	Boxing	2020–2024	0	2	0	2
16	Rıza Kayaalp	Wrestling	2008–2020	0	1	2	3
17	Hüseyin Akbaş	Wrestling	1956–1964	0	1	1	2
17	Nur Tatar	Taekwondo	2012–2020	0	1	1	2

== Change Medalists ==
1. Adem Bereket from 4th place to bronze (Wrestling at the 2000 Summer Olympics – Men's freestyle 76 kg)
2. Reyhan Arabacıoğlu from 4th place to bronze (Weightlifting at the 2004 Summer Olympics – Men's 77 kg)

== Disqualified Medalists ==
Medal	Name	Sport	Event	Date
Silver	Sibel Özkan	Weightlifting	Women's 48 kg	9 August 2008
Silver	Elvan Abeylegesse	Athletics	Women's 10000 metres	15 August 2008
Silver	Elvan Abeylegesse	Athletics	Women's 5000 metres	22 August 2008
Gold	Aslı Çakır Alptekin	Athletics	Women's 1500 metres	10 August 2012
Silver	Gamze Bulut	Athletics	Women's 1500 metres	10 August 2012

== See also ==
- List of flag bearers for Turkey at the Olympics
- Category:Olympic competitors for Turkey
- Turkey at the Paralympics
