= Francis Walter (cross-country skier) =

British cross-country skier (1909–2002)

Personal information
- Nationality: British
- Born: 28 May 1909; Mödling, Austria-Hungary
- Died: November 2002; Worcester, England

Sport
- Sport: Cross-country skiing

Francis Walter (28 May 1909 – November 2002) was a British cross-country skier. He competed in the men's 18 kilometre event at the 1936 Winter Olympics.
