= Yusuf Emre Fırat =

Turkish cross-country skier (born 2000)

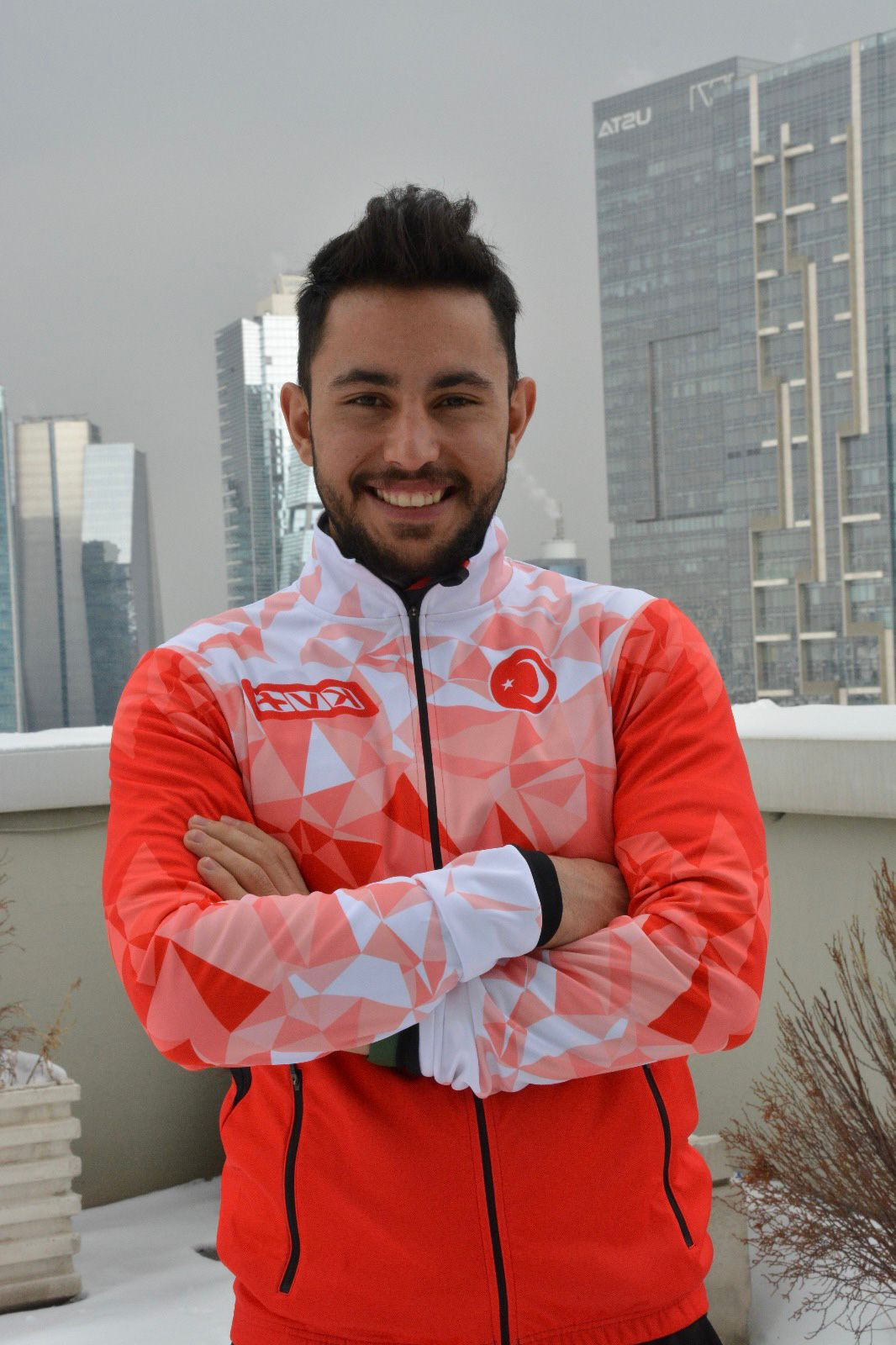

Personal information
- Nationality: Turkey
- Born: 20 March 2000 (age 26) Kars, Turkey

Sport
- Sport: Skiing
- Club: Kars Gençlik S.C.

Yusuf Emre Fırat (born 20 March 2000) is a Turkish Olympian cross-country skier.

== Early years ==
Yusuf Emre Fırat was born in Kars, Turkey on 20 March 2000.

== Sports career ==
Fırat performs cross-country skiing. He is a member of Kars Gençlik Sports Club.

He participated in the sprint, 15 km freestyle and team sprint events at the 2017 European Youth Olympic Winter Festival as well as at the FIS Nordic World Ski Championships in 2019 and 2021. He won the gold medal at the Ski Running International FIS Competition held in Erzurum, Turkey.

He competed at the 2022 Winter Olympics in Beijing, China.

== See also ==
- Turkey at the 2022 Winter Olympics
