= Turkey at the 1984 Winter Olympics =

- IOC code: TUR
- NOC: Turkish National Olympic Committee
- Website: olimpiyat.org.tr (in English and Turkish)

in Sarajevo
- Competitors: 7 (men) in 2 sports
- Medals: Gold 0 Silver 0 Bronze 0 Total 0

Winter Olympics appearances (overview)
- 1936; 1948; 1952; 1956; 1960; 1964; 1968; 1972; 1976; 1980; 1984; 1988; 1992; 1994; 1998; 2002; 2006; 2010; 2014; 2018; 2022; 2026; 2030

Turkey competed at the 1984 Winter Olympics in Sarajevo, Yugoslavia.

== Competitors ==
Sport	Men	Women	Total
Alpine skiing	4	0	4
Cross-country skiing	3	0	3
Total	7	0	7

== Alpine skiing ==
Men

Athlete	Event	Race 1		Race 2		Total	
Athlete	Event	Time	Rank	Time	Rank	Time	Rank
Erkan Mermut	Giant Slalom	1:48.58	68	1:53.35	63	3:41.93	63
Sabahattin Hamamcıoğlu	Giant Slalom	1:44.84	64	1:48.74	61	3:33.58	61
Ali Fuad Haşıl	Giant Slalom	1:44.76	63	1:47.08	59	3:31.84	60
Yakup Kadri Birinci	Giant Slalom	1:42.39	59	1:42.24	54	3:24.63	53
Sabahattin Hamamcıoğlu	Slalom	1:14.56	56	1:08.79	33	2:23.35	37
Ali Fuad Haşıl	Slalom	1:09.65	50	1:07.93	31	2:17.58	32
Erkan Mermut	Slalom	1:09.29	48	1:09.73	35	2:19.02	34
Yakup Kadri Birinci	Slalom	1:07.53	44	1:06.33	28	2:13.86	27

== Cross-country skiing ==
Men

Event	Athlete	Race	
Event	Athlete	Time	Rank
15 km	Muzaffer Selçuk	DNF	–
15 km	Erhan Dursun	53:40.3	74
15 km	Nihattin Koca	51:58.7	70
