= Hans Jamnig =

Austrian cross-country skier

Personal information
- Nationality: Austrian
- Born: 1 June 1912; Innsbruck, Austria-Hungary
- Died: 2 February 1991 (aged 78); Innsbruck, Austria

Sport
- Sport: Cross-country skiing

Hans Jamnig (1 June 1912 – 2 February 1991) was an Austrian cross-country skier. He competed in the men's 18 kilometre event at the 1936 Winter Olympics.
