= Raffaele Nasi =

Italian cross-country skier

Personal information
- Nationality: Italian
- Born: 20 October 1909 Vinadio, Kingdom of Italy
- Died: 8 May 1986 (aged 76) Cuneo, Italy

Sport
- Sport: Cross-country skiing

Raffaele Nasi (20 October 1909 – 8 May 1986) was an Italian cross-country skier. He competed in the men's 18 kilometre event at the 1936 Winter Olympics.
