= August Sonderegger =

Swiss cross-country skier

Personal information
- Nationality: Swiss
- Born: 6 August 1911

Sport
- Sport: Cross-country skiing

August Sonderegger (born 6 August 1911, date of death unknown) was a Swiss cross-country skier. He competed in the men's 18 kilometre event at the 1936 Winter Olympics.
