= Kārlis Bukass =

Latvian cross-country skier (1903–1975)

Personal information
- Nationality: Latvian
- Born: 10 September 1903; Blīdenes pagasts
- Died: 9 July 1975 (aged 71); Toronto, Ontario, Canada

Sport
- Sport: Cross-country skiing

Kārlis Bukass (10 September 1903 – 9 July 1975) was a Latvian cross-country skier. He competed in the men's 18 kilometre event at the 1936 Winter Olympics. Bukass was born in Blīdenes pagasts.
