= Atakan Alaftargil =

Turkish alpine skier (born 1976)

Personal information
- Born: November 9, 1976 (age 49) Erzurum, Turkey

Sport
- Sport: Skiing

Atakan Alaftargil (born November 9, 1976) is a retired Olympian alpine skier from Turkey, who competed in slalom and giant slalom events.

== Early life ==
Atakan Alaftargil was born on November 9, 1976, in Erzurum, Turkey. He is a member of a skiing family, his father İlhani having owned a ski equipment store at Palandöken Mountain and his three older brothers being skiers. His older brother Arif Alaftargil competed at the 1998 Winter Olympics in Nagano, Japan.

He began skiing at the age of six. He graduated from Atatürk University with a degree in physical education and sports. He is also a certified coach for skiing and snow boarding.

== Career ==
He competed for Turkey at the 2002 Winter Olympics after participating at the 2001 World Alpine Ski Championships in St. Anton, Austria.

Olympic Games
| Preceded by Arif Alaftargil | Flagbearer for Turkey; Salt Lake City 2002 | Succeeded by Tuğba Karademir |
