= Turkey at the 2006 Winter Olympics =

- IOC code: TUR
- NOC: Turkish National Olympic Committee
- Website: olimpiyat.org.tr (in English and Turkish)

in Turin
- Competitors: 6 (3 men, 3 women) in 3 sports
- Flag bearers: Tuğba Karademir (opening); Sebahattin Oglago (closing)
- Officials: 12
- Medals: Gold 0 Silver 0 Bronze 0 Total 0

Winter Olympics appearances (overview)
- 1936; 1948; 1952; 1956; 1960; 1964; 1968; 1972; 1976; 1980; 1984; 1988; 1992; 1994; 1998; 2002; 2006; 2010; 2014; 2018; 2022; 2026

Turkey competed at the 2006 Winter Olympics in Turin, Italy.

== Competitors ==
Sport	Men	Women	Total
Alpine skiing	1	1	2
Cross-country skiing	2	1	3
Figure skating	0	1	1
Total	3	3	6

== Alpine skiing ==
A 37th-place finish for Duygu Ulusoy in the Women's giant slalom was the best result for Turkey's Alpine Skiing entrants.

Athlete	Event	Final				
Athlete	Event	Run 1	Run 2	Run 3	Total	Rank
Hamit Şare	Men's giant slalom	1:52.13	did not start			
Hamit Şare	Men's slalom	1:07.57	1:01.56	n/a	2:09.13	40
Duygu Ulusoy	Women's giant slalom	1:11.43	1:19.38	n/a	2:30.81	37
Duygu Ulusoy	Women's slalom	did not finish				

== Cross-country skiing ==
The Turkish cross-country team got its top finish in the men's team sprint event, where Muhammet Kızılarslan and Sebahattin Oglago finished 22nd.

Distance

Athlete	Event	Final	
Athlete	Event	Total	Rank
Kelime Aydın	Women's 10 km classical	31:47.1	52
Kelime Aydın	Women's 15 km pursuit	Did not finish	
Kelime Aydın	Women's 30 km freestyle	1:34:07.2	49
Muhammet Kızılarslan	Men's 15 km classical	45:06.8	74
Sabahattin Oğlago	Men's 15 km classical	42:18.9	55
Sabahattin Oğlago	Men's 30 km pursuit	1:28:03.8	65
Sabahattin Oğlago	Men's 50 kilometre freestyle	Did not finish	

Sprint

Athlete	Event	Qualifying		Quarterfinal		Semifinal		Final	
Athlete	Event	Total	Rank	Total	Rank	Total	Rank	Total	Rank
Kelime Aydın	Women's sprint	2:33.33	63	Did not advance					63
Muhammet Kızılarslan	Men's sprint	2:28.94	64	Did not advance					64
Sebahattin Oglago	Men's sprint	2:31.10	67	Did not advance					67
Muhammet Kızılarslan; Sebahattin Oglago	Men's team sprint	Did not advance				19:46.5	12	Did not advance	23

== Figure skating ==
Tuğba Karademir, who finished 22nd in the ladies' event, gained some notoriety due to being featured by American network NBC, which opened one of its most watched broadcasts with a feature on her.

Athlete	Event	CD		SP/OD		FS/FD		Total	
Athlete	Event	Points	Rank	Points	Rank	Points	Rank	Points	Rank
Tuğba Karademir	Ladies'	n/a		44.20	22 Q	79.44	21	123.64	21

Key: CD = Compulsory Dance, FD = Free Dance, FS = Free Skate, OD = Original Dance, SP = Short Program

== Officials ==
- Mehmet Ali Şahin, Minister for Sports
- Togay Bayatlı, President of the National Olympic Committee of Turkey
- Neşe Gündoğan, Secretary general of the National Olympic Committee of Turkey
- Hüseyin Doğan, Olympic attaché
- Mehmet Atalay, Team chief
- Sezai Bağbaşı, Administrator
- Yunus Akgül, Administrator
- Özer Ayık, Administrator
- Ahmet Kalaycıoğlu, Physician
- Oleksandr Averin, Trainer cross-country skiing
- Atakan Araftargil, Trainer Alpine skiing
- Robert Tebby, Trainer figure skating
