= Mithat Yıldırım =

Turkish cross-country skier (born 1966)

Personal information
- Born: January 12, 1966 (age 60) Muş, Turkey

Sport
- Sport: Skiing

Mithat Yıldırım (born January 12, 1966) is a retired Olympian cross-country skier from Turkey.

Mithat Yıldırım competed for Turkey at the 1992 Winter Olympics and 1994 Winter Olympics in cross country 10 km (classical) and 10 km events. He was the flag bearer for his country at the 1994 Lillehammer Games.

In 2009, he was on the Technical Committee of the Turkey Ski Federation.

Olympic Games
| Preceded by unknown | Flagbearer for Turkey; Lillehammer 1994 | Succeeded by Arif Alaftargil |
