= Turkey at the 1960 Winter Olympics =

- IOC code: TUR
- NOC: Turkish National Olympic Committee
- Website: olimpiyat.org.tr (in English and Turkish)

in Squaw Valley
- Competitors: 2 (men) in 1 sport
- Medals: Gold 0 Silver 0 Bronze 0 Total 0

Winter Olympics appearances (overview)
- 1936; 1948; 1952; 1956; 1960; 1964; 1968; 1972; 1976; 1980; 1984; 1988; 1992; 1994; 1998; 2002; 2006; 2010; 2014; 2018; 2022; 2026

Turkey competed at the 1960 Winter Olympics in Squaw Valley, United States. Turkish athletes competed in the Men's Alpine Downhill, Men's Alpine Giant Slalom, and Men's Alpmin Slalom events.

Zeki Şamiloğlu came in 54th place out of 65 participants in the Men's Giant Slalom. Zeki Şamiloğlu also finished in 58th place out of 63 participants in the Men's Downhill. Muzaffer Demirhan was disqualified in the Men's Downhill competition.

Zeki Şamiloğlu finished 39th out of 63 participants in the Men's Slalom (40 non-disqualified). Muzaffer Demirhan also disqualified in the Men's Slalom.

== Alpine skiing ==
Men

Athlete	Event	Race 1		Race 2		Total	
Athlete	Event	Time	Rank	Time	Rank	Time	Rank
Muzaffer Demirhan	Downhill					DSQ	–
Zeki Şamiloğlu	Downhill					2:42.4	58
Muzaffer Demirhan	Giant Slalom					DSQ	–
Zeki Şamiloğlu	Giant Slalom					2:26.3	54
Zeki Şamiloğlu	Slalom	1:29.0	48	2:05.7	39	3:34.7	39
Muzaffer Demirhan	Slalom	1:26.3	42	DSQ	–	DSQ	–
