= Furkan Akar =

Turkish speed skater (born 2002)

Personal information
- Nationality: Turkish
- Born: 6 March 2002 (age 24) Erzurum, Turkey

Sport
- Country: Turkey
- Sport: Short track speed skating
- Club: Harputkapı Sports Club
Medal record
Men's short-track speed skating
Representing Turkey
World Championships
Bronze medal – third place	2026 Montreal	500 m
European Championships
Bronze medal – third place	2023 Gdańsk	1000 m

Furkan Akar (born 6 March 2002) is a Turkish Olympian short track speed skater. He is the first representative of Turkey at the Olympic Games in short track speed skating. He is also the first and only Turkish athlete placed in "Top 10" at the Winter Olympics by finishing 6th in the 1000-meter event at the 2022 Winter Olympics held in Beijing, China. Akar finished third (1:34.780) and gained a bronze medal in the 2023 European Championship 1000 metres race, a first for Turkey.

== Early years ==
Furkan Akar was born in Erzurum, Turkey on 6 March 2002. He started motivated performing winter sport by his brother while he was watching him in training. Aged nine, he began skiing.

He is a student of Sport coaching in the Sport Science Faculty at Atatürk University in Erzurum.

== Sports career ==
Akar competes in short track speed skating with the license of Erzurum G.S.İ.M. He has been in the national team since 2015.

He took the bronze medal in the Boys' 500m and the silver medal in the 1500m event at the 2019 European Youth Olympic Winter Festival held in Sarajevo, Bosnia and Herzegovina.

He participated in the Men's 1000m event at the 2021–22 ISU Speed Skating World Cup, where he ranked 17th. He won a place at the 2022 Winter Olympics in Beijing, China. He was named flagbearer along with Ayşenur Duman at the opening ceremony of the 2022 Winter Olympics. He competed in the short track speed skating 1000m event, and finished the Final B in second place with 1:36.052. He ranked 6th overall.

He ranked third at the 2023 European Short Track Speed Skating Championships.

He qualified to represent his country at the Winter Olympics for the second time. He competes in the 500 m event of Short-track speed skating at the 2026 Winter Olympics in Milan-Cortina, Italy alongside with Denis Örs. He was once again the flag bearer of the Turkish delegation during the opening ceremony with İrem Dursun.

== See also ==
- Turkey at the 2019 European Youth Olympic Winter Festival
- Turkey at the 2022 Winter Olympics

Olympic Games
Preceded by Fatih Arda İpcioğlu	Flagbearer for Turkey; Beijing 2022 with Ayşenur Duman	Succeeded by Furkan Akar
Preceded by Furkan Akar	Flagbearer for Turkey; Milan-Cortina 2026 with İrem Dursun	Succeeded by Incumbent
