= Cevdet Can =

Turkish alpine skier (born 1969)

Personal information
- Nationality: Turkish
- Born: 1 July 1969 (age 55)

Sport
- Sport: Alpine skiing

Cevdet Can (born 1 July 1969) is a Turkish alpine skier. He competed in three events at the 1992 Winter Olympics.
