= Raşit Tolun =

Turkish alpine skier (1920–2000)

Personal information
- Nationality: Turkish
- Born: 29 February 1920; Istanbul, Ottoman Empire
- Died: 23 April 2000 (aged 80)

Sport
- Sport: Alpine skiing

Raşit Tolun (29 February 1920 – 23 April 2000) was a Turkish alpine skier and chemist. He competed in two events at the 1948 Winter Olympics.

Tolun later became a professor and a chemist. He worked at several universities in multiple countries and wrote over 90 articles published in academic journals, both Turkish and foreign. He was given the 1981 Sedat Simavi award for leading the development of "production of sodium hydroxide and boric acid by the electrolysis of sodium borate solutions".
