= Margot Moles =

Spanish alpine skier (1913–1987)

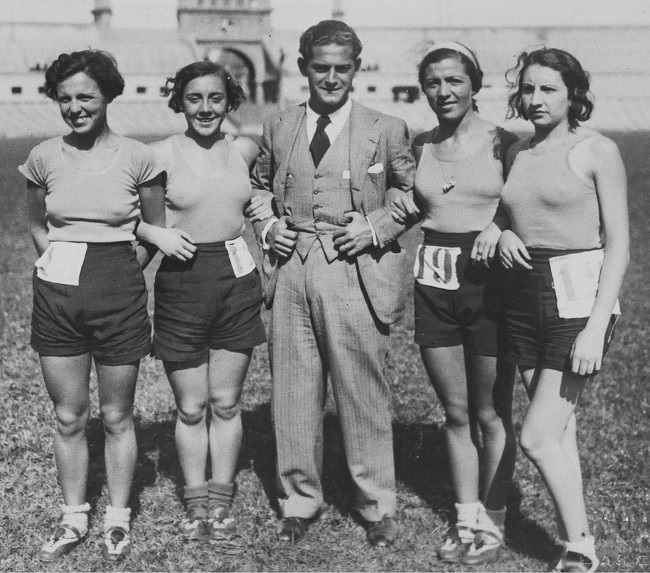
- Margot Moles, second from right, with her sister Lucinda Moles, left, at the 1932 Spanish Athletics Championships

Personal information
- Nationality: Spanish
- Born: 12 October 1910 Terrassa, Spain
- Died: 19 August 1987 (aged 76) Madrid, Spain

Sport
- Sport: Alpine skiing, hockey, swimming and athletics

Margot Moles (12 October 1910 – 19 August 1987) was a Spanish multisport player who practiced hockey, swimming, skiing and pioneer at the beginning of Spanish women's athletics. She also competed in the women's combined Alpine skiing at the 1936 Winter Olympics being the first Spanish female to participate in a Winter Olympic Games with Ernestina Maenza.
