= José Canals =

Spanish cross-country skier (1914–1937)

Personal information
- Nationality: Spanish
- Born: 10 October 1914; Barcelona, Spain
- Died: 5 August 1937 (aged 22); La Borbolla, Spain

Sport
- Sport: Cross-country skiing

José Canals (10 October 1914 – 5 August 1937) was a Spanish cross-country skier. He competed in the men's 18 kilometre event at the 1936 Winter Olympics. He was killed during the Spanish Civil War.
