= Enrique Millán =

Spanish cross-country skier

Personal information
- Nationality: Spanish
- Born: 9 February 1908; Campo de Criptana, Spain

Sport
- Sport: Cross-country skiing

Enrique Millán (born 9 February 1908, date of death unknown) was a Spanish cross-country skier. He competed in the men's 18 kilometre event at the 1936 Winter Olympics.
