= Tuğba Karademir =

Turkish figure skater

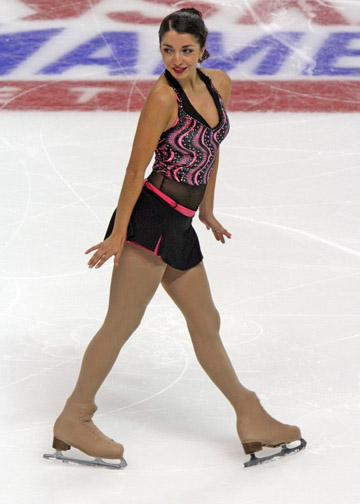
- Karademir at the 2008 Skate America.

Personal information
- Born: 17 March 1985 (age 41) Ankara, Turkey
- Height: 1.65 m (5 ft 5 in)

Figure skating career
- Country: Turkey
- Coach: Robert Tebby, Doug Leigh
- Skating club: Kocaeli Kağıtspor
- Began skating: 1990
- Retired: July 2010

Tuğba Karademir (born on 17 March 1985) is a Turkish former competitive figure skater. She won silver medals at the 2008 International Challenge Cup and 2008 Ondrej Nepela Memorial. She qualified to the free skate at two Winter Olympics (2006 Turin and 2010 Vancouver), two World Championships (2006 Calgary, 2009 Los Angeles), and seven European Championships (2004–2010). She served as the flag-bearer for Turkey at the 2006 Winter Olympics in Turin and the 2010 Winter Olympics in Vancouver.

== Personal life ==
Karademir was born on 17 March 1985 in Ankara, Turkey. In Turkey, her father, Tayfun, was a restaurateur and her mother, Sabite, worked in the aerospace industry. Upon relocating to Barrie, Ontario, Canada, they initially took on extra jobs to pay for their daughter's training. While in Barrie, she was enrolled at a local public school, Allandale Heights. She speaks Turkish and English fluently. Tugba married on 14 August 2021.

== Career ==
Karademir started skating at the age of 5, with her kindergarten class, right after the first ice rink opened in Turkey in 1990. At eight years old she competed for the first time internationally for Turkey. In 1995, she won a gold medal at a novice competition at the Balkan Games and a silver medal in the Netherlands.

Turkey had only one ice rink then, and no professional skating coaches. In 1996 her parents decided to move the family to Canada, where she could train seriously. She began training with Robert Tebby at the Mariposa School of Skating.

At the 2006 European Championships, Karademir placed 13th. She then went on to become the first figure skater from Turkey to compete in the Olympic Winter games. She was the flag bearer for Turkey during the opening ceremony. She scored a personal best of 44.2 points in the short program. Combined with her 79.44 points in the free program, she placed 21st overall with a total of 123.64 points.

At the 2006 World Championships, Karademir placed 18th with her highest finish to date at that event. In the long program, she finished 16th, giving her the 18th overall finish.

At the 2007 European Championships she achieved a new personal best in her short program and placed 10th overall.

In June 2006, Tuğba Karademir was transferred by the Kocaeli Kağıtspor.

At the 2010 Winter Olympics she received a total score of 129.54, with 50.74 in the short program and 78.80 in the free skate.

== Programs ==
Season	Short program	Free skating	Exhibition
2009–10	Bazaar Istanbul by A. Kusgoz, H. Turkemenier	Tango de los Exilados by Walter Taieb choreo. by Kurt Browning	Last Dance by Paul Jabara performed by Donna Summer; Nihavent Oyun Havası by Hilmi Rit; Haydi Efrem Yere Vurda Daglar; Segah Roman Havasi by Ismael Bascambaz choreo. by Kurt Browning
2008–09	Ocean's Thirteen by David Holmes	Ratatouille by Michael Giacchino choreo. by Kurt Browning	
2007–08	Ocean's Thirteen by David Holmes	Naqoyqatsi by Philip Glass	
2006–07	Coeurs à Cordes by Pierre Porte choreo. by Jean-Pierre Boulais	Naqoyqatsi by Philip Glass	Suddenly I See by KT Tunstall; And I Am Telling You I'm Not Going (from Dreamgirls) by Henry Krieger
2005–06	Coeurs à Cordes by Pierre Porte choreo. by Jean-Pierre Boulais	Barracuda by Richard Hunt; Tierra Querida by Julio de Caro; Adagio Tango by Mario LeBlanc; Nueve de Julio performed by Quartango choreo. by Steven Cousins	
2004–05	Cherry Pink (and Apple Blossom White) by Louiguy; Dancin' Fool choreo. by Steven Cousins	Barracuda by Richard Hunt; Tierra Querida by Julio de Caro; Adagio Tango by Mario LeBlanc; Nueve de Julio performed by Quartango choreo. by Steven Cousins	
2003–04	Cherry Pink (and Apple Blossom White) by Louiguy; Dancin' Fool choreo. by Steven Cousins	Adiós Nonino; Libertango by Astor Piazzolla choreo. by David Wilson	
2002–03	Torna a Surriento by Ernesto De Curtis	Adiós Nonino; Libertango by Astor Piazzolla choreo. by David Wilson	
2001–02	Torna a Surriento by Ernesto De Curtis	Violin Fantasy on Puccini's Turandot performed by Royal Opera House Orchestra	

== Competitive highlights ==
GP: Grand Prix

=== 2001–02 to 2009–10 ===
International
Event	01–02	02–03	03–04	04–05	05–06	06–07	07–08	08–09	09–10
Olympics					21st				24th
Worlds		30th	35th	27th	18th	27th	27th	21st	28th
Europeans	27th	27th	23rd	19th	13th	10th	11th	10th	12th
GP NHK Trophy						10th			
GP Skate America							9th	11th	12th
GP Skate Canada						11th			
Challenge Cup							2nd		
Golden Spin		7th	17th	9th			5th		4th
Nebelhorn Trophy		11th					11th	14th	
Nepela Memorial					4th			2nd	
Schäfer Memorial			9th	4th	9th	11th			
Universiade						14th		11th	

=== 1994–95 to 2000–01 ===
International
Event	1994–95	1995–96	1996–97	2000–01
Balkan Games	1st	2nd	2nd	
National
Turkish Champ.	1st	2nd	2nd	
Canadian Champ.				5th J
J = Junior level

Olympic Games
Preceded by Atakan Alaftargil	Flagbearer for Turkey; Turin 2006	Succeeded by Kelime Çetinkaya
