= Ömer Ayçiçek =

Turkish cross-country skier (born 1995)

Personal information
- Nationality: Turkish
- Born: 2 October 1995 (age 29)

Sport
- Sport: Cross-country skiing

Ömer Ayçiçek (born 2 October 1995) is a Turkish cross-country skier. He competed in the 2018 Winter Olympics.
