= Sacit Özbey =

Turkish cross-country skier (born 1953)

Personal information
- Nationality: Turkish
- Born: 13 February 1953 (age 72)

Sport
- Sport: Cross-country skiing

Sacit Özbey (born 13 February 1953) is a Turkish cross-country skier. He competed in the men's 15 kilometre event at the 1976 Winter Olympics. Çok başarılı bir kayakçıdır
