= Ersin Ayrłksa =

Turkish alpine skier (born 1956)

Personal information
- Nationality: Turkish
- Born: 27 November 1956 (age 69) Bitlis, Turkey

Sport
- Sport: Alpine skiing

Ersin Ayrłksa (born 27 November 1956) is a Turkish alpine skier. He competed in two events at the 1976 Winter Olympics.
