= Turkey at the 2002 Winter Olympics =

- IOC code: TUR
- NOC: Turkish National Olympic Committee
- Website: olimpiyat.org.tr (in English and Turkish)

in Salt Lake City, Utah
- Competitors: 3 (2 men, 1 woman) in 2 sports
- Flag bearer: Atakan Alaftargil (alpine skiing)
- Medals: Gold 0 Silver 0 Bronze 0 Total 0

Winter Olympics appearances (overview)
- 1936; 1948; 1952; 1956; 1960; 1964; 1968; 1972; 1976; 1980; 1984; 1988; 1992; 1994; 1998; 2002; 2006; 2010; 2014; 2018; 2022; 2026

Turkey was represented at the 2002 Winter Olympics in Salt Lake City, Utah, United States by the Turkish National Olympic Committee.

In total, three athletes including two men and one woman represented Turkey in two different sports including alpine skiing and cross-country skiing.

== Competitors ==
In total, three athletes represented Turkey at the 2002 Winter Olympics in Salt Lake City, Utah, United States across two different sports.

Sport	Men	Women	Total
Alpine skiing	1	0	1
Cross-country skiing	1	1	2
Total	2	1	3

== Alpine skiing ==
One Turkish athlete participated in the alpine skiing events – Atakan Alaftargil in the men's slalom.

The men's slalom took place on 23 February 2002. Alaftargil completed his first run in one minute 3.1 seconds and his second run in one minute 7.26 seconds for a combined time of two minutes 10.36 seconds to finish 32nd overall.

Men

Athlete	Event	Race 1	Race 2	Total	
Athlete	Event	Time	Time	Time	Rank
Atakan Alaftargil	Slalom	1:03.10	1:07.26	2:10.36	32

== Cross-country skiing ==
Two Turkish athletes participated in the cross-country skiing events – Kelime Çetinkaya in the women's sprint and 2 x 5 km pursuit and Sabahattin Oğlago in the men's sprint and 30 km freestyle mass start.

The men's 30 km freestyle mass start took place on 9 February 2002. Oğlago did not finish.

The women's 2 x 5 km pursuit took place on 15 February 2002. Çetinkaya completed the 5 km classical but did not advance to the 5 km classical and finished 67th overall.

The men's sprint took place on 19 February 2002. Oğlago completed the qualifying round in three minutes 18.24 seconds. He did not advance to the quarter-finals and finished 60th overall.

The women's sprint also took place on 19 February 2002. Çetinkaya completed the qualifying round in four minutes 0.5 seconds. She did not advance to the quarter-finals and finished 56th overall.

Men

Sprint

Athlete	Qualifying round		Quarter finals		Semi finals		Finals	
Athlete	Time	Rank	Time	Rank	Time	Rank	Time	Final rank
Sabahattin Oğlago	3:18.24	61	did not advance					

Event	Athlete	Race	
Event	Athlete	Time	Rank
30 km F	Sabahattin Oğlago	DNF	–

C = Classical style, F = Freestyle

Women

Sprint

Athlete	Qualifying round		Quarter finals		Semi finals		Finals	
Athlete	Time	Rank	Time	Rank	Time	Rank	Time	Final rank
Kelime Çetinkaya	4:00.50	56	did not advance					

Pursuit

Athlete	5 km C		5 km F pursuit^{2}	
Athlete	Time	Rank	Time	Final rank
Kelime Çetinkaya	17:10.8	67	did not advance	

^{2} Starting delay based on 5 km C. results.
C = Classical style, F = Freestyle
