= Tuğba Daşdemir Kocaağa =

Turkish alpine skier

Personal information
- Born: May 25, 1985 (age 41) Kayseri, Turkey
- Height: 1.65 m (5 ft 5 in)

Sport
- Sport: Skiing

Tuğba Daşdemir Kocaağa (born Tuğba Daşdemir on May 25, 1985) is an Olympian Turkish female skier competing in the alpine disciplines. The 1.65 m (5 ft 5 in) athlete is currently a research fellow for coaching at the Abant Izzet Baysal University in Bolu Province.

== Personal life ==
Tuğba Daşdemir was born in Kayseri on May 25, 1985. Her father, an employee at the Directorate of Youth Services and Sports in Kayseri, took her with him skiing at her very young age. She was four years old when he registered her in a sports club, where her older brother was also a member. In her first race at a provincial competition, she placed second in her age category. She was the winner of the next day's race. Daşdemir's skiing career started with those achievements, and she still continues.

She studied physical education and sports at Abant Izzet Baysal University in Bolu Province. After graduation, she became a research fellow for coaching at the same university.

In September 2013, she married physical education teacher Ercan Kocaağa.

== Career ==
She learnt skiing by her father, and had no coach until she was admitted to the national team. With the exception of three years, during she had to recover from an eye and a knee surgery, Daşdemir was a regular member of the national team since her 10-years of age.

Daşdemir won her first international gold medal in the slalom discipline at the 2008 FIS Alpine Skiing Championships held in Predeal, Romania on January 19.

She represented Turkey at the FIS Alpine World Ski Championships 2007 held in Åre, Sweden and at the 2010 Winter Olympics in Vancouver, British Columbia, Canada. She competed at the 2011 Winter Universiade held in Erzurum. Daşdemir took the Athlete's Oath at the opening ceremony of the Games in Erzurum on behalf of all athletes.

She will participate at the 2014 Winter Olympics in Sochi, Russia for Turkey.
