= Turkey at the 2018 Winter Olympics =

- Flag of Turkey
- IOC code: TUR
- NOC: Turkish Olympic Committee
- Website: www.olimpiyat.org.tr

in Pyeongchang, South Korea 9–25 February 2018
- Competitors: 8 (5 men and 3 women) in 4 sports
- Flag bearer: Fatih Arda İpcioğlu
- Medals: Gold 0 Silver 0 Bronze 0 Total 0

Winter Olympics appearances (overview)
- 1936; 1948; 1952; 1956; 1960; 1964; 1968; 1972; 1976; 1980; 1984; 1988; 1992; 1994; 1998; 2002; 2006; 2010; 2014; 2018; 2022; 2026

Turkey competed at the 2018 Winter Olympics in PyeongChang, South Korea, from 9 to 25 February 2018. The Turkish team consisted of eight athletes (five men and three women), competing in four sports, including ski jumping for the first time.

== Competitors ==
The following is the list of number of competitors participating at the Games per sport/discipline.

Sport	Men	Women	Total
Alpine skiing	1	1	2
Cross-country skiing	2	1	3
Figure skating	1	1	2
Ski jumping	1	0	1
Total	5	3	8

== Alpine skiing ==
Turkey qualified two athletes, one male and one female.

Athlete	Event	Run 1		Run 2		Total	
Athlete	Event	Time	Rank	Time	Rank	Time	Rank
Serdar Deniz	Men's giant slalom	1:23.45	77	1:20.78	65	2:44.23	67
Serdar Deniz	Men's slalom	DNF					
Özlem Çarıkçıoğlu	Women's giant slalom	1:27.71	64	1:25.29	57	2:53.00	57
Özlem Çarıkçıoğlu	Women's slalom	DNF					

== Cross-country skiing ==
Turkey qualified three athletes, two male and one female.

Distance

Athlete	Event	Final		
Athlete	Event	Time	Deficit	Rank
Ömer Ayçiçek	Men's 15 km freestyle	40:28.7	+6:44.8	89
Hamza Dursun	Men's 15 km freestyle	40:05.3	+6:21.4	88
Ayşenur Duman	Women's 10 km freestyle	33:06.4	+8:05.9	86

Sprint

Athlete	Event	Qualification		Quarterfinal		Semifinal		Final	
Athlete	Event	Time	Rank	Time	Rank	Time	Rank	Time	Rank
Ömer Ayçiçek	Men's sprint	3:57.91	77	did not advance					
Hamza Dursun	Men's sprint	3:36.53	71	did not advance					
Ömer Ayçiçek; Hamza Dursun	Men's team sprint	—N/a				18:45.78	14	Did not advance	

== Figure skating ==
Turkey qualified one ice dancing pair (one male and one female), based on its placement at the 2017 World Figure Skating Championships in Helsinki, Finland.

Athlete	Event	SD		FD		Total	
Athlete	Event	Points	Rank	Points	Rank	Points	Rank
Alisa Agafonova / Alper Uçar	Ice dancing	59.42	20	87.76	18	147.18	19

== Ski jumping ==
Turkey qualified one male ski jumper. This will mark the country's Winter Olympics debut in the sport.

Athlete	Event	Qualification			First round			Final			Total	
Athlete	Event	Distance	Points	Rank	Distance	Points	Rank	Distance	Points	Rank	Points	Rank
Fatih Arda İpcioğlu	Men's normal hill	79.0	68.2	57	Did not advance							
Fatih Arda İpcioğlu	Men's large hill	96.5	36.4	56	Did not advance							
