= Turkey at the 1936 Winter Olympics =

- IOC code: TUR
- NOC: Turkish National Olympic Committee
- Website: olimpiyat.org.tr (in English and Turkish)

in Garmisch-Partenkirchen
- Competitors: 6 (men) in 2 sports
- Flag bearer: Mehmut Şevket Karman
- Medals: Gold 0 Silver 0 Bronze 0 Total 0

Winter Olympics appearances (overview)
- 1936; 1948; 1952; 1956; 1960; 1964; 1968; 1972; 1976; 1980; 1984; 1988; 1992; 1994; 1998; 2002; 2006; 2010; 2014; 2018; 2022; 2026

Turkey participated at the 1936 Winter Olympics in Garmisch-Partenkirchen, Germany, held between 6 and 16 February 1936. The country's participation in the Games marked its debut appearance at the Winter Olympics.

The Turkish team consisted of six athletes including two women who competed across two sports. Skier Mehmut Şevket Karman was the country's flag-bearer during the opening ceremony. The team did not win any medals.

== Background ==
A lone Turkish athlete took part in the 1906 Summer Olympics and two Turkish entrants participated in the 1912 Summer Olympics. Turkey sent a significant official delegation with 22 participants to the 1924 Summer Olympics. Though the nation had been competing in all the Summer Olympic Games since then, it did not compete in the Winter Olympics. This edition of the Winter Games marked the country's debut in the Winter Olympics.

The 1936 Winter Olympics were held in Garmisch-Partenkirchen, Germany, between 6 and 16 February 1936. The Turkish delegation consisted of six athletes competing across two sports. Skier Mehmut Şevket Karman served as the country's flag-bearer in the Parade of Nations during the opening ceremony. The team did not win any medals in the Games.

== Competitors ==
There were six athletes who took part in the medal events across two sports.

Sport	Men	Women	Athletes
Alpine skiing	4	0	4
Cross-country skiing	4	0	4
Total	6	0	6 (Note: Total count of athletes does not match the sum of individual sports as select athletes participated in multiple sports.)

== Alpine skiing ==
Alpine skiing competitions for men were held between 7 and 9 February at Kreuzeck-Gebiet. Four Turkish athletes represented the nation in the men's combined event. The event consisted of two races – a downhill course of 3,800 m (12,500 ft) length with a descent of 959 m (3,146 ft) and a slalom event with 33 gates. In the downhill event, the Turkish athletes registered the last four finishes in the downhill event. In the slalom event, none of the Turkish athletes registered a finish.

Both the athletes failed to record a finish in the event.

Athlete	Event	Downhill		Slalom			Final	
Athlete	Event	Time	Rank	Time 1	Time 2	Rank	Points	Rank
Mehmut Şevket Karman	Men's combined	14:29.2	59	DNS	–	–	DNF	–
Nazım Aslangil	Men's combined	13:56.8	57	DNF	–	–	DNF	–
Reşat Erceş	Men's combined	22:44.4	60	DNS	–	–	DNF	–
Ülker Pamir	Men's combined	14:18.4	58	DNF	–	–	DNF	–

== Cross-country skiing ==
Cross-country skiing competitions for men were held between 12 and 15 February at Olympia-Skistadion. Two athletes represented Turkey in the men's 18 km event. While Cemal Tiğin failed to record a finish, the Mahmut Şevket Karman finished in the 72nd place. In the men's relay event, the Turkish team did not register a finish.

Athlete	Event	Time	Rank
Cemal Tiğin	Men's 18 km	DNF	–
Mahmut Şevket Karman	Men's 18 km	2'09:36	72
Cemal Tiğin; Mahmut Şevket Karman; Reşat Erceş; Sadri Erkılıç	Men's 4 × 10 km relay	DNF	–
