= Denis Örs =

Turkish speed skater (born 2005)

Personal information
- Native name: Russian: Денис Бюнйаминович Орс
- Full name: Denis Bunyaminovich Örs
- Nationality: Russia; Turkey
- Born: 28 April 2005 (age 21) Tver, Russia

Sport
- Country: Turkey
- Sport: Short track speed skating

Denis Bunyaminovich Örs (Russian: Денис Бюнйаминович Орс; born 28 April 2005), is a Russian-born Turkish Olympian short track speed skater.

== Sport career ==
=== Russia ===
Örs started speed skating in his native country of Russia. Between October and December 2020, he competed in the 500 m, 1000 m and 1500 m events at the National League Russia Cup 1 in Kolomna, Russian Cup Verkhnevolzhya in Rybinsk and Russian National Championships in Kolomna, Russia.

He gave up his sport because Russia was banned from many international sporting events due to the Russo-Ukrainian war. Following his father's advice and his Russian coach's contact with Artur Sultangaliyev, the former Kazakh national short track speed skater and the head coach of the Turkish National Speed Skating Team, he decided to leave Russia.

=== Turkey ===
Örs moved to Turkey and joined the national team in 2024.

==== 2025 ====
He internationally debuted for Turkey at the 2025 World Championships in Beijing, China, competing in the 500 m and 5000 m relay events. At the 2025 European Championships in Dresden, Germany, he took part in the 5000 m relay event with teammates Furkan Akar, Metehan Atan and Muhammed Bozdağ.

==== 2026 ====
In January 2026, Örs competed in the 500 m and 1000 m events at the 2026 European Championships in Tilburg, Netherlands.

Örs qualified to represent Turkey in the 500 m event of the short track speed skating at the 2026 Winter Olympics in Milan-Cortina, Italy, alongside Furkan Akar, who competed in the 2022 Olympics. This will mark the first time that Turkey will have two athletes participating in short track speed skating.

== Personal life ==
Denis Bunyaminovich Örs (Russian: Денис Бюнйаминович Орс), best known as Denis Örs, was born to a Turkish father and Russian mother in Tver, Russia, on 28 April 2005. After 2021, he immigrated to Turkey and acquired Turkish citizenship.
