= Tomás Velasco =

Spanish cross-country skier (1914–1997)

Personal information
- Nationality: Spanish
- Born: 21 December 1914; San Ildefonso, Spain
- Died: July 1997 (aged 82)

Sport
- Sport: Cross-country skiing

Tomás Velasco (21 December 1914 – July 1997) was a Spanish cross-country skier. He competed in the men's 18 kilometre event at the 1936 Winter Olympics.
