= Turkey at the 1976 Summer Olympics =

- IOC code: TUR
- NOC: Turkish National Olympic Committee

in Montreal
- Competitors: 27 (26 men, 1 woman) in 8 sports
- Medals: Gold 0 Silver 0 Bronze 0 Total 0

Summer Olympics appearances (overview)
- 1908; 1912; 1920; 1924; 1928; 1932; 1936; 1948; 1952; 1956; 1960; 1964; 1968; 1972; 1976; 1980; 1984; 1988; 1992; 1996; 2000; 2004; 2008; 2012; 2016; 2020; 2024

Other related appearances
- 1906 Intercalated Games

Turkey sent a team to compete at the 1976 Summer Olympics in Montreal, Quebec, Canada. 27 competitors, 26 men and 1 woman, took part in 27 events in 8 sports. However, Turkey did not win any medals at this edition of Olympics.

== Athletics ==
Men
Track and road events

Athletes	Events	Final	
Athletes	Events	Time	Rank
Hüseyin Aktaş	Marathon	2:24:30	37
Veli Ballı	Marathon	2:24:47	38

== Boxing ==
Men's Light Flyweight (– 48 kg)

- Alican Az
  1. First Round – Defeated Stephen Muchoki (KEN), walk-over
  2. Second Round – Lost to Park Chan-Hee (KOR), 0:5

== Cycling ==
One cyclist represented Turkey in 1976.

=== Track ===
Men

Athlete	Event	Time	Rank
Erol Küçükbakırcı	1 km time trial	1:12.697	23
Erol Küçükbakırcı	Individual pursuit	Overlapped	23
