= Turkey at the 2022 Winter Olympics =

- Flag of Turkey
- IOC code: TUR
- NOC: Turkish Olympic Committee
- Website: www.olimpiyat.org.tr

in Beijing, China 4–20 February 2022
- Competitors: 7 (4 men and 3 women) in 4 sports
- Flag bearers (opening): Furkan Akar; Ayşenur Duman
- Flag bearer (closing): Volunteer
- Medals: Gold 0 Silver 0 Bronze 0 Total 0

Winter Olympics appearances (overview)
- 1936; 1948; 1952; 1956; 1960; 1964; 1968; 1972; 1976; 1980; 1984; 1988; 1992; 1994; 1998; 2002; 2006; 2010; 2014; 2018; 2022; 2026

Turkey competed at the 2022 Winter Olympics in Beijing, China, from 4 to 20 February 2022.

The Turkish team consisted of seven athletes (four men and three women) competing in four sports. Furkan Akar and Ayşenur Duman were the country's flagbearer during the opening ceremony. Meanwhile a volunteer was the flagbearer during the closing ceremony.

== Competitors ==
The following is the list of number of competitors participating at the Games per sport/discipline.

| Sport | Men | Women | Total |
|---|---|---|---|
| Alpine skiing | 1 | 1 | 2 |
| Cross-country skiing | 1 | 2 | 3 |
| Short track speed skating | 1 | 0 | 1 |
| Ski jumping | 1 | 0 | 1 |
| Total | 4 | 3 | 7 |

== Alpine skiing ==
By meeting the basic qualification standards, Turkey has qualified one male and one female alpine skier.

| Athlete | Event | Run 1 | | Run 2 | | Total | |
| Athlete | Event | Time | Rank | Time | Rank | Time | Rank |
|---|---|---|---|---|---|---|---|
| Berkin Usta | Men's giant slalom | 1:17.91 | 45 | 1:24.81 | 43 | 2:42.72 | 43 |
| Berkin Usta | Men's slalom | DNF | | did not advance | | | |
| Özlem Çarıkçıoğlu | Women's slalom | 1:09.45 | 56 | 1:09.47 | 49 | 2:18.92 | 49 |
| Özlem Çarıkçıoğlu | Women's giant slalom | 1:15.98 | 59 | 1:14.75 | 47 | 2:30.73 | 48 |

== Cross-country skiing ==
Turkey has qualified one male and two female cross-country skiers.

Distance

| Athlete | Event | Final | | |
| Athlete | Event | Time | Deficit | Rank |
|---|---|---|---|---|
| Yusuf Emre Fırat | Men's 15 km classical | did not finish | | |
| Ayşenur Duman | Women's 10 km classical | 37:36.7 | 9:30.4 | 87 |
| Özlem Ceren Dursun | Women's 10 km classical | 39:17.6 | 11:11.3 | 92 |

Sprint

| Athlete | Event | Qualification | | Quarterfinal | | Semifinal | | Final | |
| Athlete | Event | Time | Rank | Time | Rank | Time | Rank | Time | Rank |
|---|---|---|---|---|---|---|---|---|---|
| Yusuf Emre Fırat | Men's sprint | 3:15.96 | 80 | did not advance | | | | | |
| Ayşenur Duman | Women's sprint | 4:08.47 | 85 | did not advance | | | | | |
| Ayşenur Duman; Özlem Ceren Dursun | Women's team sprint | —N/a | | | | LAP | 12 | Did not advance | =23 |

== Short track speed skating ==
Turkey has qualified one male short track speed skater. This will mark the country's sport debut at the Winter Olympics.

| Athlete | Event | Heat | | Quarterfinal | | Semifinal | | Final | |
| Athlete | Event | Time | Rank | Time | Rank | Time | Rank | Time | Rank |
|---|---|---|---|---|---|---|---|---|---|
| Furkan Akar | 1000 m | 1:25.462 | 2 Q | 1:25.490 | 1 Q | 1:27.102 | 3 QB | 1:36.052 | 6 |

== Ski jumping ==
Turkey qualified one male ski jumper.

| Athlete | Event | Qualification | | | First round | | | Final | | | Total | |
| Athlete | Event | Distance | Points | Rank | Distance | Points | Rank | Distance | Points | Rank | Points | Rank |
|---|---|---|---|---|---|---|---|---|---|---|---|---|
| Fatih Arda İpcioğlu | Men's normal hill | 74.5 | 52.8 | 46 Q | 99.0 | 115.0 | 36 | did not advance | | | | |
| Fatih Arda İpcioğlu | Men's large hill | 116.0 | 94.6 | 40 Q | 124.0 | 109.5 | 40 | did not advance | | | | |
