= Turkey at the 1994 Winter Olympics =

- IOC code: TUR
- NOC: Turkish National Olympic Committee
- Website: olimpiyat.org.tr (in English and Turkish)

in Lillehammer
- Competitors: 1 (man) in 1 sport
- Flag bearer: Mithat Yıldırım
- Medals: Gold 0 Silver 0 Bronze 0 Total 0

Winter Olympics appearances (overview)
- 1936; 1948; 1952; 1956; 1960; 1964; 1968; 1972; 1976; 1980; 1984; 1988; 1992; 1994; 1998; 2002; 2006; 2010; 2014; 2018; 2022; 2026

Turkey sent a delegation to compete at the 1994 Winter Olympics in Lillehammer, Norway from 12–27 February. Turkey was making its 11th appearance at the Winter Olympic Games. The delegation consisted of a single athlete, cross-country skier Mithat Yıldırım. In his only event, he finished in 87th place.

== Background ==
The Turkish Olympic Committee was recognised by the International Olympic Committee on 1 January 1911. They have participated in almost every Summer Olympic Games since, except for 1920, 1932, and the boycotted 1980 Summer Olympics. Since their first Winter Olympics participation at the 1936 Winter Olympics, Turkey has only missed three editions of the Winter Games, the 1952, 1972, and the 1980 Winter Olympics. Thus Lillehammer was Turkey's 11th appearance at a Winter Olympics. The 1994 Winter Olympics were held from 12–27 February 1994, a total of 1,737 athletes representing 67 National Olympic Committees took part. The Turkish delegation to Lillehammer consisted of a single athlete, cross-country skier Mithat Yıldırım. He was chosen as the flag bearer for the opening ceremony.

== Competitors ==
The following is the list of number of competitors in the Games.

Sport	Men	Women	Total
Cross-country skiing	1	0	1
Total	1	0	1

== Cross-country skiing ==
Mithat Yıldırım was 28 at the time of the Lillehammer Olympics, and he had previously represented Turkey two years before in the 1992 Albertville Olympics. In his only event, the 10 kilometre classical held on 17 February, he finished with a time of 32 minutes and 34.8 seconds. This put him in 87th place out of 88 men who finished the competition, and he was slightly over eight minutes behind the gold medal time, set by Bjørn Dæhlie of Norway. The silver medal was won by Kazakhstan's Vladimir Smirnov, and the bronze was taken by Marco Albarello of Italy.

Athlete	Event	Final	
Athlete	Event	Total	Rank
Mithat Yıldırım	10 km Classical	32:34.8	87
