= Abdullah Yılmaz (skier, born 1961) =

Turkish cross-country skier (born 1961)

Personal information
- Nationality: Turkish
- Born: 18 March 1961 (age 64) Ağrı, Turkey

Sport
- Sport: Cross-country skiing

Abdullah Yılmaz (born 18 March 1961) is a Turkish cross-country skier. He competed at the 1988 Winter Olympics and the 1992 Winter Olympics. Yılmaz was the flag bearer for Turkey in the opening ceremony of the 1988 Winter Olympics.
