= Ernestina Maenza =

Spanish alpine skier (1908–1995)

Personal information
- Full name: Ernestina Maenza Fernández-Calvo
- Nationality: Spanish
- Born: 22 December 1908; Lucena, Spain
- Died: 25 July 1995 (aged 86); Madrid, Spain
- Spouse: Enrique Herreros

Sport
- Sport: Alpine skiing

Ernestina Maenza (22 December 1908 – 25 July 1995) was a Spanish alpine skier. She competed in the women's combined event at the 1936 Winter Olympics with Margot Moles being the first Spanish female to participate in a Winter Olympic Games.

She was married with Enrique Herreros mountaineer, humorist, drafter, poster artist, filmmaker and mountaineer, with whom she had a child.
