= Ahmet Kıbıl =

Turkish alpine skier (1952–2011)

Ahmet Kibil
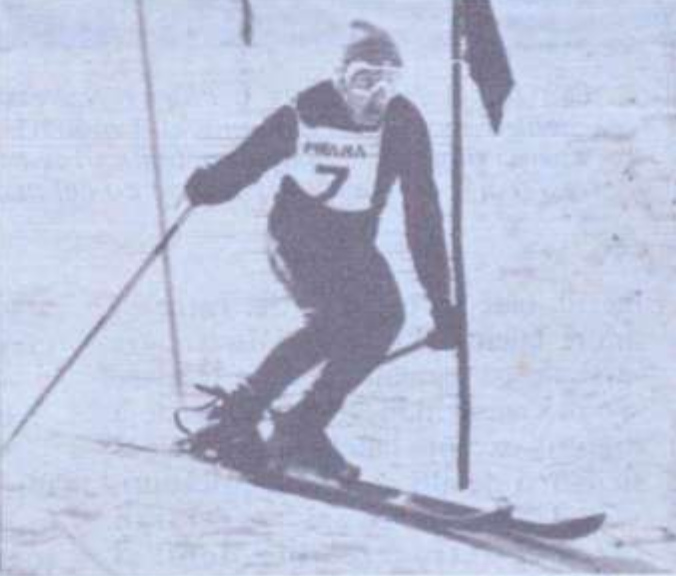
- Kıbıl in 1969

Personal information
- Nationality: Turkish
- Born: 15 December 1952 Sarıkamış, Turkey
- Died: 16 August 2011 (aged 58) Istanbul, Turkey

Sport
- Sport: Alpine skiing

Ahmet Kıbıl (15 December 1952 – 16 August 2011) was a Turkish alpine skier. He competed at the 1968 Winter Olympics and the 1976 Winter Olympics.
