= Jesús Suárez (skier) =

Spanish cross-country skier (1912–1997)

Personal information
- Nationality: Spanish
- Born: 9 January 1912 Gijón, Spain
- Died: 27 December 1997 (aged 85) Oviedo, Spain

Sport
- Sport: Cross-country skiing

Jesús Suárez (9 January 1912 – 27 December 1997) was a Spanish cross-country skier. He competed in the men's 18 kilometre event at the 1936 Winter Olympics and was the flag bearer for Spain.
