= Mehmut Şevket Karman =

Turkish alpine skier (1912–1989)

Personal information
- Nationality: Turkish
- Born: 16 May 1912 Trabzon, Turkey
- Died: 3 October 1989 (aged 77) Bornova, Turkey

Sport
- Sport: Alpine skiing

Mehmut Şevket Karman (16 May 1912 – 3 October 1989) was a Turkish alpine skier and cross-country skier. He competed in the men's combined event at the 1936 Winter Olympics.

Karman was the flag bearer for Turkey in the opening ceremony of the 1936 Olympic Games. He competed in two disciplines: alpine skiing and cross-country skiing. In alpine skiing, he competed in the combined event – the only alpine competition. After the downhill he was ranked 59th, out of the classified alpine skiers he was only ahead of his compatriot Reşat Erceş. In the slalom, he was disqualified, leaving him unclassified. In cross-country skiing he finished 72nd in the 18 km event. He also competed in the 4 × 10 km relay, but he and his team recorded a DNF.
