= Bahattin Topal =

Turkish alpine skier (born 1942)

Personal information
- Nationality: Turkish
- Born: 29 March 1942 (age 83); Erzurum, Turkey

Sport
- Sport: Alpine skiing

Bahattin Topal (born 29 March 1942) is a former Turkish alpine skier. He competed at the 1964 Winter Olympics and the 1968 Winter Olympics.

Topal later became a skiing instructor.
