= Özer Ateşçi =

Turkish alpine skier (born 1942)

Personal information
- Nationality: Turkish
- Born: 16 June 1942 (age 82); Erzurum, Turkey

Sport
- Sport: Alpine skiing

Özer Ateşçi (born 16 June 1942) is a Turkish alpine skier. He competed in three events at the 1968 Winter Olympics.
