= Turkey at the 1998 Winter Olympics =

- IOC code: TUR
- NOC: Turkish National Olympic Committee
- Website: olimpiyat.org.tr (in English and Turkish)

in Nagano
- Competitors: 1 (man) in 1 sport
- Flag bearer: Arif Alaftargil
- Medals: Gold 0 Silver 0 Bronze 0 Total 0

Winter Olympics appearances (overview)
- 1936; 1948; 1952; 1956; 1960; 1964; 1968; 1972; 1976; 1980; 1984; 1988; 1992; 1994; 1998; 2002; 2006; 2010; 2014; 2018; 2022; 2026

Turkey sent a delegation to compete at the 1998 Winter Olympics in Nagano, Japan, from 7 to 22 February 1998. This was Turkey's 12th time appearing at a Winter Olympic Games. The Turkish delegation to Nagano consisted of a single alpine skier, Arif Alaftargil. In the men's slalom, he finished in 29th place.

== Background ==
The Turkish Olympic Committee was recognized by the International Olympic Committee on 1 January 1911. They have participated in almost every Summer Olympic Games since, except for 1920, 1932, and the boycotted 1980 Summer Olympics. Since their first Winter Olympics participation at the 1936 Winter Olympics, Turkey has only missed three editions of the Winter Games, the 1952, 1972, and the 1980 Winter Olympics. Nagano was Turkey's 12th appearance at a Winter Olympics. The 1998 Winter Olympics were held from 7–22 February 1998; a total of 2,176 athletes took part, representing 72 National Olympic Committees. The Turkish delegation to Nagano consisted of a single alpine skier, Arif Alaftargil. He was chosen as the flag bearer for the opening ceremony.

== Competitors ==
The following is the list of number of competitors in the Games.

Sport	Men	Women	Total
Alpine skiing	1	0	1
Total	1	0	1

== Alpine skiing ==
Arif Alaftargil was 24 years old at the time of the Nagano Olympics, and was making his Olympic debut. In the two-run men's slalom, held on 21 February, he finished the first run in a time of 1 minute and 12.36 seconds. He completed the second run in a similar time of 1 minute and 12.73 seconds, making his combined time 2 minutes and 25.09 seconds. This placed him 29th, out of 31 skiers who finished both legs of the race; however over 30 skiers failed to finish both runs. The gold medal was won in 1 minute and 49.31 seconds by Hans Petter Buraas of Norway, the silver by fellow Norwegian Ole Kristian Furuseth, and the bronze was taken by Thomas Sykora of Austria.

Athlete	Event	Race 1	Race 2	Total	
Athlete	Event	Time	Time	Time	Rank
Arif Alaftargil	Men's slalom	1:12.36	1:12.73	2:25.09	29
