= Turkey at the 1908 Summer Olympics =

- Flag of the Ottoman Empire
- IOC code: TUR
- NOC: Ottoman National Olympic Society

in London
- Competitors: 1 in 1 sport
- Medals: Gold 0 Silver 0 Bronze 0 Total 0

Summer Olympics appearances (overview)
- 1908; 1912; 1920; 1924; 1928; 1932; 1936; 1948; 1952; 1956; 1960; 1964; 1968; 1972; 1976; 1980; 1984; 1988; 1992; 1996; 2000; 2004; 2008; 2012; 2016; 2020; 2024

Other related appearances
- 1906 Intercalated Games

The Ottoman Empire was represented by one athlete, Aleko Mulos, at the 1908 Summer Olympics in London, United Kingdom. During the Olympics, the Ottoman Empire was referred to as Turkey. It was the first recognized appearance of the Ottoman State, though at least two athletes from Smyrna had previously competed for Greece in 1896.

== Results by event ==
=== Gymnastics ===
Gymnast	Event	Score	Rank
Aleko Mulos	Men's all-around	154.5	67
