= Erhan Dursun =

Turkish cross-country skier (born 1962)

Personal information
- Nationality: Turkish
- Born: 5 January 1962 (age 63); Karakose, Turkey

Sport
- Sport: Cross-country skiing

Erhan Dursun (born 5 January 1962) is a Turkish cross-country skier. He competed at the 1984 Winter Olympics and the 1988 Winter Olympics.

He later became a coach and worked as an administrator for the national team.
