= Yakup Kadri Birinci =

Turkish alpine skier (born 1967)

Personal information
- Nationality: Turkish
- Born: 24 November 1967 (age 58) Erzurum, Turkey

Sport
- Sport: Alpine skiing

Yakup Kadri Birinci (born 24 November 1967) is a Turkish alpine skier. He competed at the 1984, 1988 and the 1992 Winter Olympics.
