= Sabahattin Oğlago =

Turkish cross-country skier (born 1984)

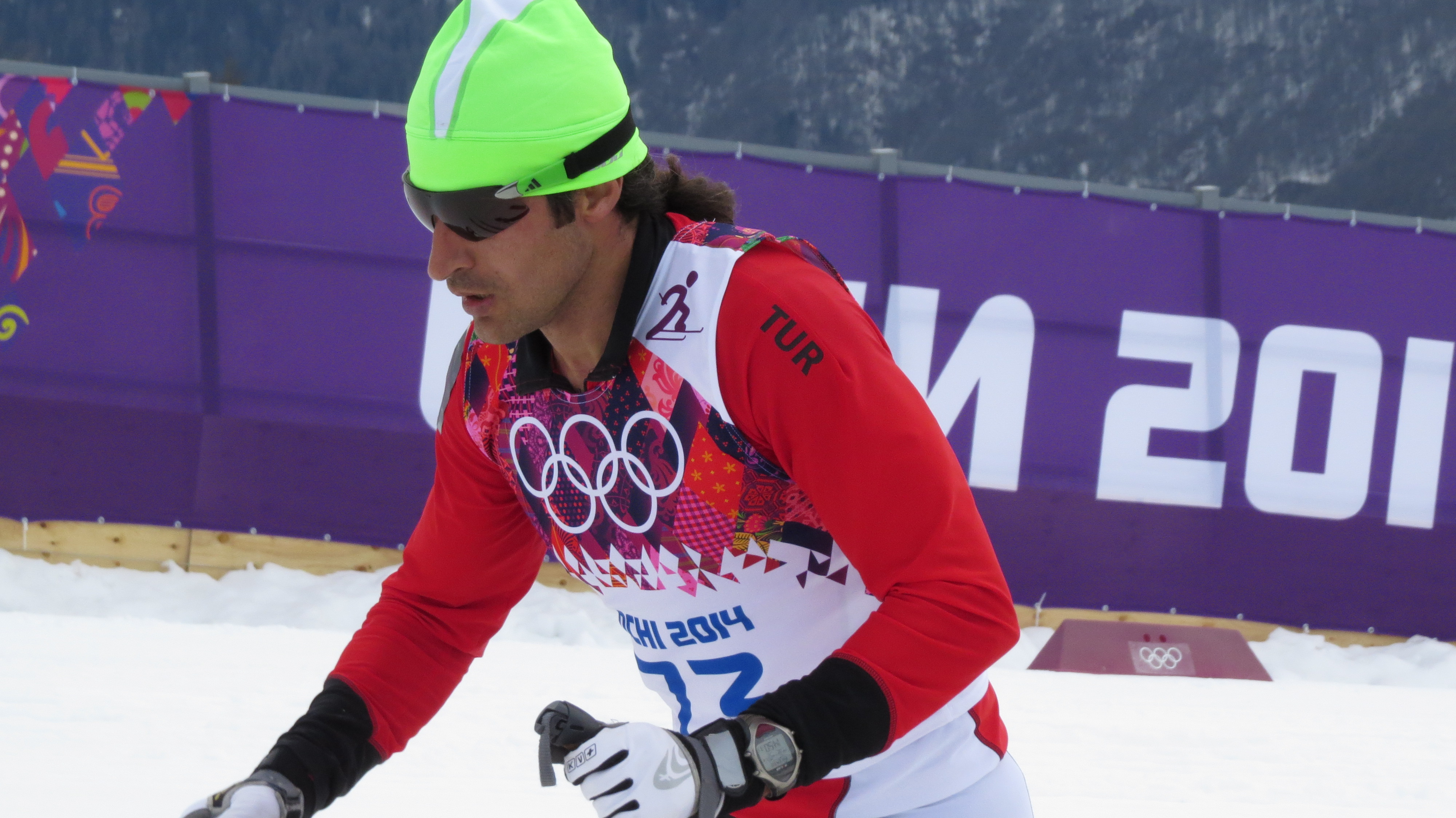
- Sabahattin Oğlago in the Cross-country skiing at the 2014 Winter Olympics – Men's 15 kilometre classical.

Personal information
- Born: June 25, 1984 (age 42) Muş, Turkey
- Height: 1.74 m (5 ft 9 in)

Sport
- Sport: Skiing

Sabahattin Oğlago (born June 25, 1984) is a Turkish cross-country skier. He is a four-time Olympian, competing at the 2002 Winter Olympics, 2006 Winter Olympics 2010 Winter Olympics and 2014 Winter Olympics. He is 1.74 m (5 ft 8 1/2 in) tall and weighs 64 kg (141 lb).

Born in Muş on June 25, 1984, he earned his best finish of 22nd in the team sprint at Turin in 2006, while his best individual finish was 60th in the individual sprint event at Salt Lake City four years earlier.

Oğlago's best finish at the FIS Nordic World Ski Championships was 54th in the 30 km mixed pursuit event at Sapporo in 2007.

His best World Cup finish was 62nd in an individual sprint event at Estonia in 2008. While representing his country at the 2011 World Universities Winter Games in Erzurum, he carried the Turkish flag at the opening ceremony of the games. Competing in the individual sprint category, he ranked fourth in the rankings.
