= Zeki Şamiloğlu =

Turkish alpine skier (born 1937)

Personal information
- Nationality: Turkish
- Born: 29 January 1937 (age 88) Sarıkamış, Turkey

Sport
- Sport: Alpine skiing

Zeki Şamiloğlu (born 29 January 1937) is a Turkish alpine skier. He competed at the 1956, 1960 and 1964 Winter Olympic Games.
