= Osman Yüce =

Turkish alpine skier (1929–1965)

Personal information
- Nationality: Turkish
- Born: 21 April 1929; Sarıkamış, Turkey
- Died: 26 January 1965 (aged 35); Uludağ, Turkey

Sport
- Sport: Alpine skiing

Osman Yüce (21 April 1929 – 26 January 1965) was a Turkish alpine skier. He competed at the 1948, 1956 and the 1964 Winter Olympics.
