= Muzaffer Demirhan =

Turkish alpine skier (1932–2002)

Personal information
- Nationality: Turkish
- Born: 17 July 1932 Gümüşhane, Turkey
- Died: 11 December 2002 (aged 70)

Sport
- Sport: Alpine skiing

Muzaffer Demirhan (17 July 1932 – 11 December 2002) was a Turkish alpine skier. He competed at the 1948, 1956, 1960 and the 1964 Winter Olympics.
