= Kelime Çetinkaya =

Turkish cross-country skier (born 1982)

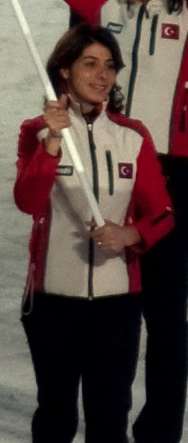
Çetinkaya bearing the Turkish flag at the opening ceremony of the 2010 Winter Olympics

Kelime Aydın Çetinkaya (born 15 June 1982) is a Turkish cross-country skier. She became the first Turkish female athlete to compete in the Winter Olympics. She has competed in four Olympics as part of the Turkish national team, in 2002, 2006, 2010 and 2014.

== Career ==
Çetinkaya has competed in international competitions since 2000. In 2001, she competed as part of the Turkish junior team, and as an adult in the FIS Alpine Ski World Cup in years 2003, 2005, 2007, and 2009. She had two victories in the FIS World Cup races. Çetinkaya's best finish at the FIS Nordic World Ski Championships was 41st in the 30 km event at Sapporo in 2007. Her best World Cup finish was 46th in a sprint event in Italy in 2004.

== Olympics ==
In 2002, Çetinkaya became the first Turkish female athlete to take part in the Winter Olympics. Competing in three Winter Olympics, she earned her best finish of 49th in the 30 km event at Turin in the 2006.

She was the flagbearer for Turkey in the 2010 Olympics.

== Bibliography ==
- Kelime Cetinkaya at the International Ski and Snowboard Federation
- Turkey National Olympic Committee website (in Turkish)
- Press and Information Office of the Turkish Government website
- Turkish newspaper Milliyet (in Turkish)
- Информация на сайте Олимпиады-2010
- Информация на сайте FIS

Olympic Games
Preceded by Tuğba Karademir	Flagbearer for Turkey; Vancouver 2010	Succeeded by Alper Uçar
