= 2011 Turkish football match-fixing scandal =

Association football and political scandal

The 2011 Turkish sports corruption scandal was an investigation into match fixing and incentive premiums, in Turkey's top two association football divisions, the Süper Lig and First League, that started on 3 July 2011. In 2017, a court ruling determinded that the proceedings initiated in 2011-12 was a conspiracy orchestrated by the Fethullahist Terror Organization (FETÖ).

== Timeline of the investigation ==
In the summer of 2011, Turkish police began an investigation into 19 football matches suspected of being fixed, and by 10 July 61 individuals had been arrested, including club managers and Turkish national team players. 26 of these would later have requests for release refused by the court.

Around the same time, İstanbul BB player İbrahim Akın admitted to participating in match fixing, specifically relating to two matches: Istanbul BB's match against Fenerbahçe, and the Turkish Cup final against Beşiktaş. Following his arrest, Akın withdrew his confession, claiming he had been tricked and his confession given under duress, and denied any involvement in the alleged corruption. Beşiktaş president Yıldırım Demirören later returned the Turkish Cup following match-fixing allegations levelled at his own club.

=== August 2011 ===
On 15 August, the report of the TFF's Ethics Committee was presented to the general assembly of the TFF. The first report of the TFF's Ethics Committee (340 pages) was completely hidden from public scrutiny and from FIFA and UEFA. However, the summary section of the report (38 pages) was leaked to the press. Prof. Dr. Oğuz Atalay, chairman of the committee, confirmed that the document published in the press was the actual document.

=== July 2011 ===
The TFF banned Fenerbahçe from participating in the 2011–12 Champions League. UEFA announced that Trabzonspor would replace them.

Many members of the European football community voiced their concerns about the situation, with UEFA president Michel Platini saying how the match-fixing scandals had "badly tarnished the game" and that the developments were "not good for Turkish football". FIFA president Sepp Blatter also had his say, stating "We cannot intervene at the first stage; we must let the jurisdictional organization of the different states [take action], and when these people are condemned and found guilty, then we will suspend them for life... Then they will never come back to football – being officials or being players, they will be banned for life".

=== January 2012 ===
On 31 January 2012, the President of the Turkish Football Federation Mehmet Ali Aydınlar, the Vice Presidents of TFF Göksel Gümüşdağ (chairman of İstanbul Başakşehir F.K.), and Lutfi Arıboğan (who then became a Galatasaray board member) resigned from all duties.

=== April 2012 ===
On 30 April 2012, the Turkish Football Federation changed article 58 of the disciplinary regulations regarding the penalization of match-fixing. In response to the TFF's decision, Trabzonspor announced that they would hold a meeting with UEFA as soon as possible. Galatasaray S.K reacted against the TFF's decision and made a statement regarding the issue. Bursaspor also reacted against the decision. On the same day, the Turkish Football Federation added a new article to the disciplinary regulations that all punishments, including relegation and point deduction can be postponed, Article 105.

=== May 2012 ===
On 3 May 2012, Galatasaray applied to the TFF Arbitration Board to suspend and annul the decision regarding the amendment on Article 58 and Article 105 of the disciplinary regulations of the TFF.

On 4 May 2012, Trabzonspor and Bursaspor also applied to the TFF Arbitration Board to suspend and annul the decision regarding the amendment on Article 58 and Article 105 of the disciplinary regulations of the TFF.

On 5 May 2012, the Turkish Football Federation Arbitration Board rejected the appeals and the objections of the clubs.

On 7 May 2012, the Turkish Football Federation gave a verdict for the people involved with the case. The federation banned İbrahim Akın of İstanbul BB for three years for allegedly fixing the result of a match when his team lost to Fenerbahçe 2–0 on 1 May 2011. It also banned Serdar Kulbilge of Gençlerbirliği for two years for allegedly attempting to fix the result of a match that Fenerbahçe won 4–2.

=== June 2012 ===
On 1 June 2012, specially-authorized Istanbul Public Prosecutor Ufuk Ermertcan demanded that the Istanbul 16th High Criminal Court hand down jail sentences for the suspects as part of an investigation into the match-fixing scandal. The Istanbul 16th High Criminal Court rejected the lawyers' request to release Fenerbahçe President Aziz Yıldırım, Olgun Peker, İlhan Ekşioğlu, and Yusuf Turanlı. The court also ruled to release Ahmet Çelebi, Ali Kıratlı, Haldun Şenman, Sami Dinç, and İbrahim Bülent İşcen, who were in custody, pending trial. The court hearings were to be resumed on 26 June.

On 4 June 2012, the Arbitration Board of the Turkish Football Federation reduced the penalties for three suspects in a match-fixing scandal while upholding the sentences of other suspects. The arbitration board reduced Akın's sentence from three years to two years. Kulbilge's sentence was reduced from two years to three matches. The PFDK gave Karan two years' deprivation of rights, but the Arbitration Board changed his sentence to a two-year ban from participating in future games.

On 22 June 2012, the UEFA Control and Disciplinary Body made a decision:

- To allow the Disciplinary Inspector and Fenerbahce to file additional submissions to the Control and Disciplinary Body
- For the time being the club of Fenerbahce is allowed to participate in the UEFA competition for which it is eligible pending a final decision of the UEFA Disciplinary Body in this regard.

— Kamuyu Aydınlatma Platformu (Public Disclosure Platform)

=== July 2012 ===
On 2 July 2012, the specially-authorized Turkish court convicted and sentenced Aziz Yıldırım to six years and three months in prison on match-fixing charges. Fenerbahçe Vice President Şekip Mosturoğlu was sentenced to one year, ten months and then days in prison. Another official was sentenced to 1 year and 2 months in prison.

=== August 2012 ===
On 10 August 2012, the Istanbul 16th High Criminal Court announced its reasoned decision regarding the match-fixing case.

== Events after the investigation ==
=== June 2013 ===
On 25 June 2013, UEFA banned Fenerbahçe and Beşiktaş from European competitions over match-fixing allegations. Fenerbahçe was banned for a total of two seasons for which they qualify for either the Champions League or Europa League, with the ban for the third campaign deferred for a probationary period of five years, while Beşiktaş will miss next season's Europa League. Both clubs are to appeal against a UEFA decision to bar the two clubs from European competitions on match-fixing accusations. 5th Civil Court of First Instance temporarily suspended three Fenerbahçe officials, including chairman Aziz Yıldırım.

=== July 2013 ===
On 18 July 2013, CAS announced that the final decision on Fenerbahçe would be issued before 28 August and a final decision on Beşiktaş on 30 August.

On 24 July 2013, the Supreme Court of Appeals Prosecutor's Office demanded upholding of the verdicts in the match-fixing trial.

=== August 2013 ===
On 28 August 2013, the Court of Arbitration for Sport decided to reject Fenerbahçe's appeal against their suspension from European competition. Fenerbahçe was banned from European competitions for two years after the Court of Arbitration for Sport (CAS) opted to uphold the club's punishment for their alleged involvement in match-fixing in Turkey.

On 30 August 2013, the Court of Arbitration for Sport decided to reject Beşiktaş JK's appeal against their suspension from European competition. Beşiktaş was banned from European competitions for one year after the Court of Arbitration for Sport (CAS) opted to uphold the club's punishment for their involvement in match fixing in Turkey.

=== January 2014 ===
On 17 January 2014, the Republic of Turkey Supreme Court approved decisions on match fixing.

=== March 2014 ===
On 6 March 2014, specially-authorized courts were abolished in Turkey.

On 26 March 2014, Gianni Infantino stated that UEFA gave his final verdict about Fenerbahçe and Beşiktaş, reminding that both clubs had already been punished by UEFA, meaning that no further punishment would be given to the clubs. After being asked about Trabzonspor's president's earlier statements about UEFA's dealings, he added, "İbrahim Hacıosmanoglu is Trabzonspor's president, not UEFA's".

=== May 2014 ===
On 21 May 2014, UEFA launched an investigation against Sivasspor and Eskişehirspor and heard the cases on 2 and 3 June. On 6 June 2014, it was declared that Eskişehirspor and Sivasspor were not eligible to participate in the 2014/15 UEFA Europa League. Both Sivasspor and Eskişehirspor's officials announced that they would appeal to CAS to change the result of this case.

On 27 May 2014, Fenerbahçe appealed to the Swiss domestic courts, on the grounds that "the final verdict is against the public order", which is one of the situations that must happen if the accused wants to appeal to UEFA's and CAS' final verdict. With this appeal, Fenerbahçe is working to lift the "ban from the European competitions for 2 years".

On 29 May 2014, Mutlu Ekizoğlu, the chief constable of this investigation (also many others like Ergenekon trials and Sledgehammer conspiracy), was suspended from duty pending investigation.

=== June 2014 ===
On 7 June 2014, Abdullah Mirza Coşkun, the newly assigned prosecutor of the match-fixing scandal, demanded a retrial from the 13th High Criminal Court (the newly assigned court for the match-fixing scandal) for Aziz Yıldırım. On 23 June 2014, this demand was accepted by the courts, meaning that all the convicted people would have a retrial.

After Fenerbahçe's official complaint, on 27 June 2014, the UEFA Control and Disciplinary Board launched a new investigation against Trabzonspor and would decide on the case on 17 July. UEFA asked for Trabzonspor's defense about this investigation. Fenerbahçe's official complaint is based on then-Sivasspor player Mehmet Yıldız's notary-approved, detailed statements about an offer of incentive premium from Trabzonspor for the Sivasspor-Fenerbahçe game.

=== July 2014 ===
On 7 July 2014, CAS rejected the appeals of Eskişehirspor and Sivasspor, meaning that both clubs were not allowed to participate in any European competition for a year.

On 15 July 2014, Trabzonspor made an official objection to the 13th Istanbul High Criminal Court about the accepted retrial demand.

On 18 July 2014, the UEFA Control and Disciplinary Board assigned an inspector to the cases of both the Turkish Football Federation (official complaint by Trabzonspor) and Trabzonspor (official complaint by Fenerbahçe).

On 24 July 2014, about an earlier application of Fenerbahçe to lift the two-year European Cups ban, Swiss domestic courts gave time to Fenerbahçe until 5 August to counter the defences of both CAS and UEFA. Swiss domestic courts also rejected Fenerbahçe's suspension of execution demand for the ban from European Cups because UEFA has guaranteed to pay any compensation if necessary.

=== August 2014 ===
On 30 August 2014, Trabzonspor declared that, again, they had sent letters to both UEFA and FIFA about their concerns that the corruption scandal was not handled correctly.

=== September 2014 ===
On 3 September 2014, Trabzonspor's earlier official objection to the 13th Istanbul High Criminal Court was rejected, meaning that the retrial process would begin.

=== October 2014 ===
On 24 October 2014, the Swiss domestic courts rejected Fenerbahçe's application for compensation from UEFA and CAS. Fenerbahçe stated that "This decision is made because of the result of the trials before. After the retrial process, we will use every option to get our compensation."

=== November 2014 ===
On 21 November 2014, Trabzonspor requested recusal from the 13th Istanbul High Criminal Court, citing that the court had lost its neutrality. This request was denied on 19 December 2014.

=== December 2014 ===
On 15 December 2014, UEFA rejected Trabzonspor's official complaint about the Turkish Football Federation and Fenerbahçe's official complaint about Trabzonspor. Trabzonspor declared that they would continue to pursue this matter by applying to both FIFA and CAS.

== Retrial Process ==
=== April 2015 ===
The first trial of the retrial process was held on 24 April 2015. During this trial, Fenerbahçe lawyers urged the court not to rule according to the evidence that had been presented by a chief constable who has now been expelled from his job. The trial was postponed to 8 July 2015.

=== October 2015 ===
On 9 October 2015, the courts acquitted all the people who were charged at the beginning of the investigation, pending the Supreme Court's approval. Fenerbahçe declared that after the Supreme Court's approval, they would take every action to be compensated for all the damages that had been done to the club by this investigation and previous court rulings.

=== March 2023 (damages) ===
In March 2023, the 14th Heavy Criminal Court of Anatolia awarded damages to former Fenerbahçe president Aziz Yıldırım for his 365-day unlawful detention. Yıldırım was awarded 8,089 lira in material damages and 100,000 lira in non-material damages to partially alleviate the suffering, torment and emotional distress he had endured. During his period of detention, he was prevented from practising.
