= Lutfi Arıboğan =

Turkish basketball player and executive

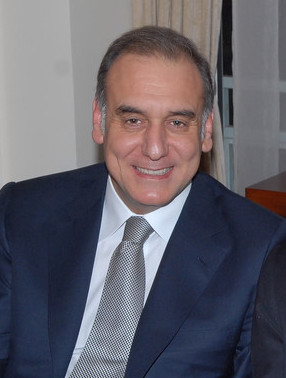

Lutfi Arıboğan (born 1961) is a Turkish Sports Administrator and a former basketball player.

A former Turkish basketball player, Arıboğan played for club teams Çukobirlik, Ankara DSİ, Efes Pilsen, Galatasaray and Ülkerspor from 1971 to 1996. Capped by the Turkish National Basketball teams 243 times, he also captained Galatasaray for six years.

Following his basketball career, he worked as the general manager of Ülkerspor for 8 years. In 2005, he became the general secretary of the Turkish Football Association under the presidency of Levent Bıçakçı and continued to serve in various roles under TFF presidents Haluk Ulusoy, Hasan Doğan, Mahmut Özgener and Mehmet Ali Aydınlar until January 2012.

On June 6, 2012 he was announced as the Chief Executive Officer of Galatasaray Sportif A.Ş. and held this position until October 2014.

He was married to the Bahçeşehir University former rector, and Istanbul Bilgi University Board of Trustees Member Prof. Dr. Deniz Ülke Arıboğan.
