= APOEL FC in European football =

APOEL Football Club is a Cypriot team based in Nicosia, Cyprus that have competed in European football since the 1960s.

== 2002–03 European campaign ==
In the 2002–03 season, the football team embarked on an impressive run, playing ten games before being knocked out from the European competitions. The team participated in the 2002–03 Champions League and after eliminating Flora Tallinn (0–0 away draw, 1–0 home win) and NK Maribor (1–2 away loss, 4–2 home win), was knocked out by AEK Athens (2–3 home loss, 0–1 away loss) in the third qualifying round. So, they entered the UEFA Cup on the first round and after eliminating Grazer AK (2–0 home win, 1–1 away draw) they advanced until the second round when they were knocked out by Hertha Berlin (0–1 home loss, 0–4 away loss).

== Champions League 2009–10 group stages ==
The first big success of the club in European competitions came on season 2009–10, when the team reached the group stages of the 2009–10 UEFA Champions League for the first time, by eliminating EB/Streymur (2–0 away win, 3–0 home win), FK Partizan (2–0 home win, 0–1 away loss) and F.C. Copenhagen (0–1 away loss, 3–1 home win) in the play-off round. APOEL were drawn in Group D against Chelsea F.C., FC Porto and Atlético Madrid. APOEL drew 0–0 against Atlético Madrid in the first game at Vicente Calderón, lost 0–1 from Chelsea F.C. at GSP stadium on matchday 2, lost 2–1 from FC Porto at Dragão in the third match and lost again 0–1 from FC Porto at GSP Stadium on matchday 4. In the fifth match of the group APOEL drew with Atlético Madrid 1–1 at GSP Stadium and on matchday 6, APOEL drew with Chelsea F.C. at Stamford Bridge. So, APOEL finished fourth having equal (3) points with the eventual UEFA Europa League winner Atlético Madrid, but failed to qualify to UEFA Europa League, because of the away goal that Atlético Madrid had scored in Nicosia.

== Champions League 2011–12 quarter-finals ==

APOEL's 2011–12 UEFA Champions League starting line-up that managed to beat Lyon 1–0 (4–3 pen.) at home and reached the quarter-finals, marking APOEL's greatest achievement in their history.

APOEL's greatest success in European competitions came on season 2011–12. Two years after its first participation, APOEL qualified again for the UEFA Champions League group stages by eliminating Skënderbeu Korçë (2–0 away win, 4–0 home win), Slovan Bratislava (0–0 home draw, 2–0 away win) and Wisła Kraków (0–1 away loss, 3–1 home win) in the play-off round.

APOEL drawn in Group G, alongside FC Porto, Shakhtar Donetsk and Zenit St. Petersburg. On matchday 1, APOEL won 2–1 against Zenit St. Petersburg at GSP Stadium and secured its first ever victory in the UEFA Champions League group stage. On matchday 2, APOEL held Shakhtar Donetsk to a 1–1 draw at the Donbass Arena and in the third match they drew 1–1 with FC Porto at Dragão. On matchday 4, APOEL won 2–1 against FC Porto at GSP Stadium and on the next matchday they made history and reached the last 16 of the UEFA Champions League by holding Zenit St. Petersburg to a 0–0 draw in Petrovsky Stadium. Eventually, APOEL reached the last 16 as a group winner, despite losing 0–2 at home from Shakhtar Donetsk on the last matchday.

In the last 16, APOEL was drawn against Olympique Lyonnais. Lyon won 1–0 in the first leg at Stade de Gerland, but in the second leg at GSP Stadium APOEL won 1–0, sending the match to penalties where they won 4–3, reaching the quarter-finals for the first time.

In the quarter-finals, APOEL hosted Real Madrid in the first leg, but were defeated 0–3 by the Spanish giants. In the second leg at Santiago Bernabéu, APOEL managed to score twice but Real Madrid won by 5–2 and reached the semi-finals with an aggregate score of 8–2.

== Europa League 2013–14 group stages ==
APOEL began their 2013–14 European campaign in the third qualifying round of the 2013–14 UEFA Champions League against Slovenian side NK Maribor. In the first leg, the two teams drew 1–1 at GSP Stadium, but in the second leg at Slovenia, APOEL only managed a goalless draw and eliminated by NK Maribor on away goals rule after a 1–1 aggregate score.

After being eliminated from the UEFA Champions League, APOEL dropped down into the UEFA Europa League play-off round, and drawn against Belgian side Zulte Waregem. The first leg was held at the Constant Vanden Stock Stadium in Brussels and ended in a 1–1 draw. In the second leg, APOEL lost 1–2 at GSP Stadium and Belgians went through 3–2 on aggregate. Despite losing to Zulte Waregem in the play-off round, APOEL reinstated in Europa League replacing the Turkish side Fenerbahçe who were banned because of the match-fixing case related to the 2010–11 Süper Lig title. APOEL were selected by a random drawing among all the losing teams from the play-off round and drawn in Group F, alongside Bordeaux, Eintracht Frankfurt and Maccabi Tel Aviv. APOEL began their group stage adventure with a goalless draw at Bloomfield Stadium against Maccabi Tel Aviv on 19 September 2013. On matchday 2, APOEL were beaten 0–3 at GSP Stadium by German side Eintracht Frankfurt. On matchday 3, APOEL were stunned by a last-minute Bordeaux winner, as they went down to a 2–1 defeat at Stade Chaban-Delmas in France. On matchday 4, APOEL won 2–1 against French side Bordeaux at Nicosia's GSP Stadium and secured its first ever victory in the UEFA Europa League group stages. On matchday 5, APOEL were held to a goalless draw by Israeli side Maccabi Tel Aviv at GSP Stadium and remained in third place of Group F, three points behind second-placed Maccabi Tel Aviv. APOEL's Europa League adventure was concluded at Commerzbank-Arena with a 2–0 loss to Group F winners Eintracht Frankfurt on 12 December 2013. Eintracht completed the group stage of the competition on top of the Group F standings with 15 points, Maccabi Tel Aviv ended second with 11 points, APOEL ended in third place with five points, while Bordeaux were at the bottom with just three points.

== Champions League 2014–15 group stages ==
Three years after their surprising run to the quarter-finals of the 2011–12 UEFA Champions League, APOEL qualified again for the UEFA Champions League group stages, for the third time in their history. They eliminated HJK Helsinki in the third qualifying round by drawing 2–2 at Finland and winning 2–0 at home and trashed AaB in the play-off round by drawing 1–1 at Denmark and winning 4–0 at home. APOEL were drawn in Group F alongside Barcelona, Paris Saint-Germain and Ajax.

APOEL opened their Champions League campaign with a 1–0 defeat against Barcelona at Camp Nou thanks to a Gerard Piqué's goal, but left the Catalan capital with all the plaudits following a stellar display which so nearly earned a historic result. On matchday 2, Gustavo Manduca cancelled out Lucas Andersen's opener to secure a first Group F point for APOEL, after a 1–1 draw against Ajax at GSP Stadium. On matchday 3, despite another excellent display against one of the continent's strongest sides, APOEL were left bitterly disappointed as they went down to a 0–1 home defeat at the hands of Paris Saint-Germain following a late Edinson Cavani goal, just three minutes before the end. On matchday 4, APOEL fell to a 1–0 defeat against Paris Saint-Germain at Parc des Princes, as Edinson Cavani was again the difference between the two teams, scoring the only goal of the match after just 56 seconds. On matchday 5, Barcelona proved too much for APOEL as the Catalan giants cruised to a 4–0 win in a night that belonged to Lionel Messi as his hat-trick in Nicosia made him the UEFA Champions League's all-time top scorer on 74 goals. On matchday 6, APOEL suffered a 4–0 defeat to Ajax at Amsterdam Arena in the battle for third place and were sent out of European competitions after finishing fourth in Group F with just one point.

== Europa League 2015–16 group stages ==
APOEL began their 2015–16 European campaign in the second qualifying round of the 2015–16 UEFA Champions League, eliminating FK Vardar on away goals rule after a 0–0 draw at home and a 1–1 away draw. In the third qualifying round they eliminated Danish champions FC Midtjylland again on away goals rule after a 2–1 away win and a 0–1 home defeat. APOEL were eliminated by Kazakh champions FC Astana in the play-off round, losing 0–1 at Kazakhstan and drawing 1–1 at Nicosia.

After being eliminated in the play-off round of the Champions League, APOEL were automatically transferred to the group stage of the UEFA Europa League, drawn in Group K alongside Schalke 04, Sparta Prague and Asteras Tripolis. APOEL's Europa League campaign got off to bad start as they suffered a 3–0 defeat by Schalke 04 at GSP Stadium in Nicosia. On matchday 2, APOEL fell to a second straight defeat, going down to a 2–0 loss to Sparta Prague at Generali Arena. On 22 October 2015, APOEL came from behind to earn their first points in Group K after beating Asteras Tripolis 2–1 at GSP Stadium, thanks to goals by Fernando Cavenaghi and Carlão. On matchday 4, APOEL's chances of making the knockout phase of the Europa League were dealt a huge blow as they suffered a 2–0 defeat at the hands of Asteras Tripolis at Theodoros Kolokotronis Stadium. On 26 November 2015, a late Schalke 04 winner at Veltins-Arena was enough to knock APOEL out of UEFA Europa League. APOEL ended their Europa League group stage campaign with a 1–3 home defeat by Sparta Prague, despite Fernando Cavenaghi's early opener and finished bottom of Group K with just three points.

== Europa League 2016–17 round of 16 ==

APOEL's 2016–17 UEFA Europa League starting line-up that managed to beat Athletic Bilbao 2–0 at home and reached the last 16 of the competition.

APOEL began their 2016–17 European campaign in the second qualifying round of the 2016–17 UEFA Champions League, eliminating Welsh champions The New Saints after a 0–0 draw away and a 3–0 win at home. In the third qualifying round they eliminated Norwegian champions Rosenborg BK after a 1–2 away defeat and a 3–0 home victory. APOEL were eliminated by Danish champions FC Copenhagen in the play-off round, losing 0–1 at Denmark and drawing 1–1 at Nicosia.

After being eliminated by FC Copenhagen in the play-off round of the Champions League, APOEL were automatically transferred to the group stage of the UEFA Europa League, drawn in Group B alongside Olympiacos, Young Boys and FC Astana. APOEL got their Europa League group stage campaign off to a winning start after coming from behind to beat FC Astana 2–1 at GSP Stadium. On matchday 2, APOEL earned their first ever continental group stage away win with a shock 0–1 victory over Olympiacos in Piraeus. On matchday 3, two second-half penalties condemned APOEL to their first defeat of their Europa League campaign, as they went down 3–1 away to Young Boys. On matchday 4, APOEL achieved an important 1–0 victory over Young Boys at GSP Stadium and made a big step towards their qualification to the knockout phase of the competition. On matchday 5, APOEL made history after becoming the first Cypriot club to reach the knockout phase of the UEFA Europa League, despite losing 2–1 away to FC Astana. On matchday 6, APOEL secured top spot in Group B of the Europa League after an impressive 2–0 win over Olympiacos at the GSP stadium, and set a new club (and national) record by accruing 12 points in this season's group stage.

Despite being one of the seeded teams, APOEL handed a tough draw in the UEFA Europa League round of 32 as they were drawn to face Basque giants Athletic Bilbao. In the first leg, APOEL managed to keep the dream of reaching the last 16 of the UEFA Europa League alive, after a 3–2 first leg defeat by Athletic Bilbao at San Mamés. APOEL went through to the last 16 of the Europa League after a stunning 2–0 second leg win over Athletic Bilbao in Nicosia, overturning the 3–2 deficit from the first leg thanks to goals by Pieros Sotiriou and Giannis Gianniotas.

APOEL were drawn to face Belgian side R.S.C. Anderlecht in the last 16 of the UEFA Europa League and were eventually eliminated from the competition after falling to a narrow 0–1 home defeat in the first leg and another 0–1 defeat one week later in Belgium.

== European competitions record ==
UEFA competitions
Competition	Played	Won	Drawn	Lost	Goals for	Goals against	Last season played
UEFA Champions League	94	29	25	40	99	122	2019–20
UEFA Europa League / UEFA Cup	80	30	17	33	103	110	2019–20
UEFA Cup Winners' Cup	30	6	6	18	27	78	1997–98
Total	195	61	47	87	220	300	

=== Matches ===
#Q = #preliminary, #R = #round, PO = play-offs, G = Group stage, R32 = Round of 32, R16 = last 16, QF = quarter-finals

Season	Competition	Round	Opponent	Home	Away	Aggregate
1963–64	Cup Winners' Cup	Q	(Norway) SK Gjøvik-Lyn	6–0	1–0	7–0
1963–64	Cup Winners' Cup	1R	(Portugal) Sporting CP	0–2^{1}	1–16	1–18
1965–66	European Cup	Q	(West Germany) Werder Bremen	0–5^{2}	0–5	0–10
1968–69	European Cup Winners' Cup	1R	(Scotland) Dunfermline Athletic	0–2	1–10	1–12
1969–70	European Cup Winners' Cup	1R	(Belgium) Lierse S.K.	0–1^{3}	1–10	1–11
1973–74	European Cup	1R	(Soviet Union) Zorya Voroshilovgrad	0–1	0–2	0–3
1976–77	European Cup Winners' Cup	1R	(Greece) Iraklis	2–0	0–0	2–0
1976–77	European Cup Winners' Cup	2R	(Italy) Napoli	1–1	0–2	1–3
1977–78	UEFA Cup	1R	(Italy) Torino	1–1	0–3	1–4
1978–79	European Cup Winners' Cup	1R	(Republic of Ireland) Shamrock Rovers	0–2	0–1	0–3
1979–80	European Cup Winners' Cup	Q	(Denmark) Boldklubben 1903	0–1	0–6	0–7
1980–81	European Cup	1R	(East Germany) Dynamo Berlin	2–1	0–3	2–4
1981–82	UEFA Cup	1R	(Romania) Argeş Piteşti	1–1	0–4	1–5
1984–85	European Cup Winners' Cup	1R	(Switzerland) Servette	0–3	1–3	1–6
1985–86	UEFA Cup	1R	(Bulgaria) Lokomotiv Sofia	2–2	2–4 (a.e.t.)	4–6
1986–87	European Cup	1R	(Finland) HJK Helsinki	1–0	2–3	3–3 (a)
1986–87	European Cup	2R	(Turkey) Beşiktaş	Withdrew (Political reasons)		
1988–89	UEFA Cup	1R	(Socialist Federal Republic of Yugoslavia) RŠD Velež	2–5	0–1	2–6
1990–91	European Cup	1R	(West Germany) Bayern Munich	2–3	0–4	2–7
1992–93	UEFA Champions League	1R	(Greece) AEK Athens	2–2	1–1	3–3 (a)
1993–94	European Cup Winners' Cup	Q	(Northern Ireland) Bangor	2–1	1–1	3–2
1993–94	European Cup Winners' Cup	1R	(France) Paris Saint-Germain	0–1	0–2	0–3
1995–96	UEFA Cup Winners' Cup	Q	(Azerbaijan) Neftchi Baku	3–0	0–0	3–0
1995–96	UEFA Cup Winners' Cup	1R	(Spain) Deportivo La Coruña	0–0	0–8	0–8
1996–97	UEFA Cup	1Q	(Faroe Islands) B71 Sandur	4–2	5–1	9–3
1996–97	UEFA Cup	2Q	(Greece) Iraklis	2–1	1–0	3–1
1996–97	UEFA Cup	1R	(Spain) RCD Espanyol	2–2	0–1	2–3
1997–98	UEFA Cup Winners' Cup	Q	(Faroe Islands) HB Tórshavn	6–0	1–1	7–1
1997–98	UEFA Cup Winners' Cup	1R	(Austria) Sturm Graz	0–1	0–3	0–4
1999–00	UEFA Cup	Q	(Bulgaria) Levski Sofia	0–0	0–2	0–2
2000–01	UEFA Cup	Q	(Albania) Tomori	2–0	3–2	5–2
2000–01	UEFA Cup	1R	(Belgium) Club Brugge	0–1	0–2	0–3
2002–03	UEFA Champions League	1Q	(Estonia) Flora Tallinn	1–0	0–0	1–0
2002–03	UEFA Champions League	2Q	(Slovenia) Maribor	4–2	1–2	5–4
2002–03	UEFA Champions League	3Q	(Greece) AEK Athens	2–3	0–1	2–4
2002–03	UEFA Cup	1R	(Austria) Grazer AK	2–0	1–1	3–1
2002–03	UEFA Cup	2R	(Germany) Hertha BSC	0–1	0–4	0–5
2003–04	UEFA Cup	Q	(Republic of Ireland) Derry City	2–1	3–0	5–1
2003–04	UEFA Cup	1R	(Spain) RCD Mallorca	1–2	2–4	3–6
2004–05	UEFA Champions League	2Q	(Czech Republic) Sparta Prague	2–2	1–2	3–4
2005–06	UEFA Cup	1Q	(Malta) Birkirkara	4–0	2–0	6–0
2005–06	UEFA Cup	2Q	(Israel) Maccabi Tel Aviv	1–0	2–2 (a.e.t.)	3–2
2005–06	UEFA Cup	1R	(Germany) Hertha BSC	0–1	1–3	1–4
2006–07	UEFA Cup	1Q	(San Marino) S.S. Murata	3–1	4–0	7–1
2006–07	UEFA Cup	2Q	(Turkey) Trabzonspor	1–1	0–1	1–2
2007–08	UEFA Champions League	1Q	(Belarus) BATE Borisov	2–0	0–3 (a.e.t.)	2–3
2008–09	UEFA Cup	1Q	(North Macedonia) FK Pelister	1–0	0–0	1–0
2008–09	UEFA Cup	2Q	(Serbia) Red Star Belgrade	2–2	3–3 (a.e.t.)	5–5 (a)
2008–09	UEFA Cup	1R	(Germany) Schalke 04	1–4	1–1	2–5
2009–10	UEFA Champions League	2Q	(Faroe Islands) EB/Streymur	3–0	2–0	5–0
2009–10	UEFA Champions League	3Q	(Serbia) FK Partizan	2–0	0–1	2–1
2009–10	UEFA Champions League	PO	(Denmark) Copenhagen	3–1	0–1	3–2
2009–10	UEFA Champions League	Group D	(Spain) Atlético Madrid	1–1	0–0	4th place
2009–10	UEFA Champions League	Group D	(England) Chelsea	0–1	2–2	4th place
2009–10	UEFA Champions League	Group D	(Portugal) Porto	0–1	1–2	4th place
2010–11	UEFA Europa League	2Q	(Lithuania) FK Tauras	3–1	3–0	6–1
2010–11	UEFA Europa League	3Q	(Czech Republic) FK Jablonec	1–0	3–1	4–1
2010–11	UEFA Europa League	PO	(Spain) Getafe	1–1 (a.e.t.)	0–1	1–2
2011–12	UEFA Champions League	2Q	(Albania) Skënderbeu	4–0	2–0	6–0
2011–12	UEFA Champions League	3Q	(Slovakia) Slovan Bratislava	0–0	2–0	2–0
2011–12	UEFA Champions League	PO	(Poland) Wisła Kraków	3–1	0–1	3–2
2011–12	UEFA Champions League	Group G	(Russia) Zenit St. Petersburg	2–1	0–0	1st place
2011–12	UEFA Champions League	Group G	(Ukraine) Shakhtar Donetsk	0–2	1–1	1st place
2011–12	UEFA Champions League	Group G	(Portugal) Porto	2–1	1–1	1st place
2011–12	UEFA Champions League	R16	(France) Lyon	1–0 (a.e.t.)	0–1	1–1 (4–3 p)
2011–12	UEFA Champions League	QF	(Spain) Real Madrid	0–3	2–5	2–8
2012–13	UEFA Europa League	2Q	(Slovakia) FK Senica	2–0	1–0	3–0
2012–13	UEFA Europa League	3Q	(Norway) Aalesunds FK	2–1	1–0	3–1
2012–13	UEFA Europa League	PO	(Azerbaijan) Neftchi Baku	1–3	1–1	2–4
2013–14	UEFA Champions League	3Q	(Slovenia) Maribor	1–1	0–0	1–1 (a)
2013–14	UEFA Europa League	PO	(Belgium) Zulte Waregem	1–2	1–1	2–3
2013–14	UEFA Europa League	Group F^{4}	(Israel) Maccabi Tel Aviv	0–0	0–0	3rd place
2013–14	UEFA Europa League	Group F^{4}	(Germany) Eintracht Frankfurt	0–3	0–2	3rd place
2013–14	UEFA Europa League	Group F^{4}	(France) Bordeaux	2–1	1–2	3rd place
2014–15	UEFA Champions League	3Q	(Finland) HJK Helsinki	2–0	2–2	4–2
2014–15	UEFA Champions League	PO	(Denmark) AaB	4–0	1–1	5–1
2014–15	UEFA Champions League	Group F	(Spain) Barcelona	0–4	0–1	4th place
2014–15	UEFA Champions League	Group F	(Netherlands) Ajax	1–1	0–4	4th place
2014–15	UEFA Champions League	Group F	(France) Paris Saint-Germain	0–1	0–1	4th place
2015–16	UEFA Champions League	2Q	(North Macedonia) FK Vardar	0–0	1–1	1–1 (a)
2015–16	UEFA Champions League	3Q	(Denmark) Midtjylland	0–1	2–1	2–2 (a)
2015–16	UEFA Champions League	PO	(Kazakhstan) Astana	1–1	0–1	1–2
2015–16	UEFA Europa League	Group K	(Germany) Schalke 04	0–3	0–1	4th place
2015–16	UEFA Europa League	Group K	(Czech Republic) Sparta Prague	1–3	0–2	4th place
2015–16	UEFA Europa League	Group K	(Greece) Asteras Tripolis	2–1	0–2	4th place
2016–17	UEFA Champions League	2Q	(Wales) The New Saints	3–0	0–0	3–0
2016–17	UEFA Champions League	3Q	(Norway) Rosenborg BK	3–0	1–2	4–2
2016–17	UEFA Champions League	PO	(Denmark) Copenhagen	1–1	0–1	1–2
2016–17	UEFA Europa League	Group B	(Kazakhstan) Astana	2–1	1–2	1st place
2016–17	UEFA Europa League	Group B	(Greece) Olympiacos	2–0	1–0	1st place
2016–17	UEFA Europa League	Group B	(Switzerland) Young Boys	1–0	1–3	1st place
2016–17	UEFA Europa League	R32	(Spain) Athletic Bilbao	2–0	2–3	4–3
2016–17	UEFA Europa League	R16	(Belgium) Anderlecht	0–1	0–1	0–2
2017–18	UEFA Champions League	2Q	(Luxembourg) F91 Dudelange	1–0	1–0	2–0
2017–18	UEFA Champions League	3Q	(Romania) Viitorul Constanța	4–0 (a.e.t.)	0–1	4–1
2017–18	UEFA Champions League	PO	(Czech Republic) Slavia Prague	2–0	0–0	2–0
2017–18	UEFA Champions League	Group H	(Spain) Real Madrid	0–6	0–3	4th place
2017–18	UEFA Champions League	Group H	(Germany) Borussia Dortmund	1–1	1–1	4th place
2017–18	UEFA Champions League	Group H	(England) Tottenham Hotspur	0–3	0–3	4th place
2018–19	UEFA Champions League	1Q	(Lithuania) Sūduva Marijampolė	1–0	1−3	2–3
2018–19	UEFA Europa League	2Q	(Estonia) Flora Tallinn	5–0	0–2	5–2
2018–19	UEFA Europa League	3Q	(Israel) Hapoel Be'er Sheva	3–1	2–2	5–3
2018–19	UEFA Europa League	PO	(Kazakhstan) Astana	1–0	0−1	1–1 (1–2 p)
2019–20	UEFA Champions League	2Q	(Montenegro) Sutjeska	3–0	1–0	4–0
2019–20	UEFA Champions League	3Q	(Azerbaijan) Qarabağ	1–2	2–0	3–2
2019–20	UEFA Champions League	PO	(Netherlands) Ajax	0–0	0–2	0–2
2019–20	UEFA Europa League	Group A	(Spain) Sevilla	1–0	0–1	2nd place
2019–20	UEFA Europa League	Group A	(Azerbaijan) Qarabağ	2–1	2–2	2nd place
2019–20	UEFA Europa League	Group A	(Luxembourg) F91 Dudelange	3–4	2–0	2nd place
2019–20	UEFA Europa League	R32	(Switzerland) Basel	0–3	0–1	0–4
2020–21	UEFA Europa League	1Q	(Kosovo) Gjilani	—N/a	2–0 (a.e.t.)	—N/a
2020–21	UEFA Europa League	2Q	(Kazakhstan) Kaisar	—N/a	4–1	—N/a
2020–21	UEFA Europa League	3Q	(Bosnia and Herzegovina) Zrinjski Mostar	2–2 (4–2 p)	—N/a	—N/a
2020–21	UEFA Europa League	PO	(Czech Republic) Slovan Liberec	—N/a	0–1	—N/a
2022–23	UEFA Europa Conference League	2Q	(Bulgaria) Botev Plovdiv	2–0	0–0	2−0
2022–23	UEFA Europa Conference League	3Q	(Kazakhstan) Kyzylzhar	1–0	0–0	1−0
2022–23	UEFA Europa Conference League	PO	(Sweden) Djurgårdens IF	3–2	0–3	3–5
2023–24	UEFA Europa Conference League	2Q	(Serbia) Vojvodina	2−1	2−1	4−2
2023–24	UEFA Europa Conference League	3Q	(Georgia (country)) Dila Gori	1−0	2−0	3−0
2023–24	UEFA Europa Conference League	PO	(Belgium) Gent	1−2	0−2	1−4
2024–25	UEFA Champions League	2Q	(Moldova) Petrocub Hîncești	1−0	1−1	2−1
2024–25	UEFA Champions League	3Q	(Slovakia) Slovan Bratislava	0−0	0−2	0−2
2024–25	UEFA Europa League	PO	(Latvia) RFS	2–1	1–2	3–3 (2–4 p)
2024–25	UEFA Conference League	League phase	(Republic of Ireland) Shamrock Rovers	—N/a	1–1	11th place
2024–25	UEFA Conference League	League phase	(Bosnia and Herzegovina) Borac Banja Luka	0–1	—N/a	11th place
2024–25	UEFA Conference League	League phase	(Italy) Fiorentina	2–1	—N/a	11th place
2024–25	UEFA Conference League	League phase	(Norway) Molde	—N/a	1–0	11th place
2024–25	UEFA Conference League	League phase	(Armenia) Noah	—N/a	3–1	11th place
2024–25	UEFA Conference League	League phase	(Kazakhstan) Astana	1–1	—N/a	11th place
2024–25	UEFA Conference League	Knockout phase play-offs	(Slovenia) Celje	0−2	2−2	2−4

^{1}: Both matches played in Portugal.
^{2}: Both matches played in Germany.
^{3}: Both matches played in Belgium.
^{4}: APOEL reinstated in the Europa League by random draw after Fenerbahçe's exclusion from the UEFA competitions due to match-fixing.
