= Acıbadem University =

Turkish private university located in İstanbul

Acıbadem Mehmet Ali Aydınlar University
- Type: Private (non-profit)
- Established: 2007; 19 years ago
- President: Ahmet Şahin
- Location: Istanbul, Turkey; 40.9785°N 29.1103°E
- Campus: Kerem Aydınlar Campus
- Founder: Acıbadem Health and Education Foundation
- Website: acibadem.edu.tr/en/

University rankings

Regional – Overall
- QS Emerging Europe and Central Asia: 177 (2022)

Acıbadem Mehmet Ali Aydınlar University (ACU) is a non-profit foundation university in Istanbul, Turkey, dedicated to the field of health sciences. The university was founded in 2007 by Mehmet Ali Aydınlar, an entrepreneur and founder of Acıbadem Healthcare Group, Turkey's leading healthcare institution.

As of 2019, ACU serves 4374 undergraduate and graduate students through School of Medicine, Faculty of Pharmacy, Faculty of Health Sciences, Faculty of Arts and Sciences, Faculty of Engineering, two Vocational Schools and four graduate schools; Institute of Health Sciences, Institute of Social Sciences, Institute of Natural and Applied Sciences, and Institute of Senology.

ACU operates in a main campus and two affiliated hospitals, Acıbadem Maslak Hospital and Acıbadem Atakent Hospital, for education and research purposes. Kerem Aydınlar Campus, centrally located on the Asian side of Istanbul offers students a privileged university life.

== Academics ==
=== Faculty and Departments ===
Acıbadem School of Medicine

Faculty of Pharmacy

Faculty of Health Sciences

- Physiotherapy and Rehabilitation Department
- Nursing Department
- Health Management Department
- Nutrition and Dietetics Department

Faculty of Arts and Sciences

- Molecular Biology and Genetics Department
- Psychology Department
- Sociology Department

Faculty of Engineering

- Medical Engineering Department
- Computer Engineering

=== Institutes ===
- Institute of Health Sciences
- Institute of Natural and Applied Sciences
- Institute of Social Sciences
- Research Institute of Senology (RISA)

=== Vocational School of Health Services ===
- Oral and Dental Health
- Operating Room Services
- Anaesthesia
- Dialysis
- Electroneurophysiology
- First and Emergency Aid
- Audiometry
- Opticianry
- Orthopedic Prosthetics and Orthotics
- Pathology Laboratory Techniques
- Podology
- Radiotherapy
- Medical Documentation and Secretarial
- Medical Imaging Techniques
- Medical Laboratory Techniques

=== Vocational Schools ===
- Culinary
- Biomedical Equipment Technology

== See also ==
- Acıbadem University School of Medicine
- Acıbadem Healthcare Group
