= Rezan =

Rezan is a Turkish given name, as well as a surname of multiple origins. Notable people with the name include:

== Given name ==
- Rezan Corlu, Danish professional footballer
- Resan Hanım, consort of Sultan Murad V of the Ottoman Empire
- Rezan Topaloğlu, Turkish pediatrician and an academic
- Rezan Zuğurlu, mayor of the district of Lice in Diyarbakır Province, Turkey

== Surname ==
- Anna Rezan, Greek singer
- Marija Režan, Croatian basketball player
