= Acıbadem University School of Medicine =

Private, graduate school in Istanbul, Turkey

- Type: Private
- Established: 2007
- Dean: Prof. Dr. Yasemin Alanay
- Students: 435
- Location: Istanbul, Turkey; 40°55′31″N 29°09′16″E
- Campus: Urban
- Website: medicine.acibadem.edu.en

Acıbadem University School of Medicine is the medical school of Acıbadem University. Acıbadem University is a private, non-profit institution, founded in 2007 and located in Istanbul, Turkey. The University is supported by the financial resources of the Kerem Aydınlar Foundation, set up by Mehmet Ali Aydınlar. Mehmet Ali Aydınlar is a leading Turkish businessman and the largest shareholder and CEO of the Acıbadem Healthcare Group, Turkey's leading healthcare institution that was founded in 1992.

== History ==
Under the direction of Acıbadem University, the School of Medicine was established in 2007. After two years of work on faculty base and education plans, the Faculty began the 2009-2010 education years with students.

== Medical education ==
The education is in English at Acıbadem University School of Medicine. Students who are admitted to the medical school must take the English Language Proficiency Examination or present equivalent proof of exam scores (TOEFL, etc.). Students who fail the exam have to attend English preparatory class for one year.

The medical education programme features 3 phases:

- 1. Phase I : Basic and Clinical Sciences, from year 1 to year 3
- 2. Phase II: Clinical Clerkship, from year 4 to year 5
- 3. Phase III: Internship, Family Medicine, year 6

The education is based on an integrated curriculum. In this program, systems within the human body are described from the simplest units such as the cell to more complex systems including pathologies, in subject committees. In Phase I, groups of subject committees form a whole curriculum for a given year. In addition, there are special blocks such as Clinical Medicine and Professional Skills (CMPS), Medical Informatics, Biostatistics and Medical Technologies, Interactive Modules, Medical English and Elective Courses. The term “Subject committee” means that topics of a given subject like “cell” or “organ systems” are described in a coordinated manner by different departments. These committees contain theoretical lectures, practical studies, and modules. Integrated programs within the subject committees provide equal participation of basic and clinical sciences to teach a particular organ system. As an example; the gastrointestinal system will be given in all aspects by contributions from basic sciences and clinical sciences. The courses include both knowledge from basic sciences like anatomy, physiology, biochemistry and clinical aspects like pathology, diagnosis, treatment and prevention.

The curriculum of Phase 1 consists of 14 subject committees; 4 in year I, 5 in year 2 and 5 in year 3. In Phase I, within subject committee interactive modules are organized. In these modules, students work in small groups under the guidance of tutors and analyze cases related to the subject committee to acquire self-directed learning skills. Clinical Medicine and Professional Skills (CMPS) is a three-year interdisciplinary program of Phase I. This program is organized by the departments of Public Health and Family Medicine and features five courses: Clinical and Communication Skills, Health and Society, Research in Health, and Medical Humanities. The CMPS program has been designed as an initial introduction to medical professionalism, providing a knowledge and mixed toolbox of skills.

Year 4 and Year 5 are called the “Clinical Clerkship Period” and comprise the training at hospital and primary care settings. Teaching staff of clinical departments supervise the students, who work on a full-time basis. This clerkship periods focus mainly on history taking, physical examinations, and follow-up of patients as well as bedside practice, lectures and seminars.

Year 6 is termed “Clinical Internship” and lasts twelve months. The students take the responsibility of patient care under the supervision of teaching staff. Clinical rotations are absolved in Internal Medicine, Surgery and Emergency Care, Child Health and Diseases, Gynaecology and Obstetrics, Psychiatry, and Public Health. The primary health care and community medicine perspective is incorporated in the training by clinical rotations in family health centres, community health centres, and the outpatient clinic of the Department of Family Medicine.

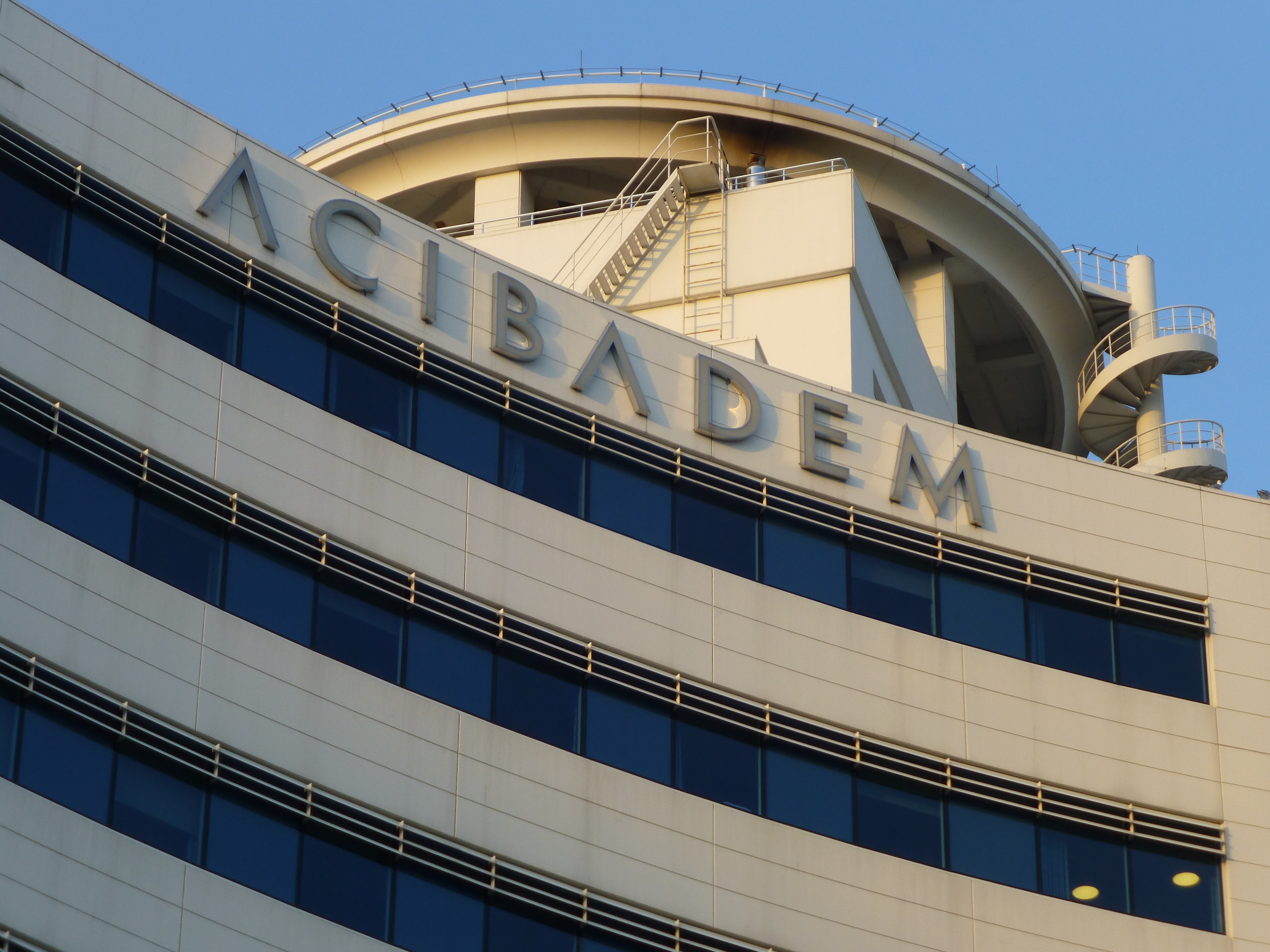
Acıbadem Beşiktaş (Fulya) Hospital

=== Examinations ===
Each subject committee of Phase I features at least one subject committee midterm exam and a theoretical and practical subject committee exam held after each committee. Interactive modules have a separate examination. Clinical Medicine and Professional Skills courses are evaluated according to their learning outcomes, which may vary based on educational methods. At the end of each year, a final exam is held featuring all subjects given throughout the year, which has a weighted mean of 40 percent of the total passing grade.

For Year 4 and Year 5, students must attend theoretical and practical examinations at the end of each clerkship period.

=== Grading system ===
For each year of Phase I, the course grades consist of 60% of course examinations and 40% of final examination. Passing grades are calculated according to national credits of a given course. For Phase II, passing grades are calculated by taking the average of clerkship examination grades.

=== Credits ===
There are two types of credit systems; Local Credits and European Credit Transfer System credits (ECTS). One theoretical hour or two practical hours per week account for one local credit. At each committee, every 14 theoretical hours or 28 practical hours are assigned as one credit. ECTS credits are calculated based on students’ workload (featuring theoretical, practical hours and study time).

== Activities ==
Acıbadem organizes weekly and monthly scientific seminars and conferences with in-company and guest speakers.

== Acıbadem Education and Healthcare Foundation ==
By establishing the Acıbadem Education and Healthcare Foundation the Acıbadem Group has taken an important step forward in terms of Healthcare Education and wishes to take part at the academic platform and is also planning to open a modern university in near future.

== See also ==
- Acıbadem University
- Acıbadem Healthcare Group
