= Turkish National Olympic Committee =

Governing Olympic body of the Republic of Turkey

- Country: Turkey
- [[|]]
- Code: TUR
- Created: 1908 (Ottoman National Olympic Society)
- Recognized: 1911
- Continental Association: EOC
- Headquarters: Istanbul, Turkey
- President: Ahmet Gülüm
- Secretary General: Neşe Gündoğan
- Website: olimpiyat.org.tr

The Turkish National Olympic Committee (TNOC; Turkish: Türkiye Milli Olimpiyat Komitesi, TMOK; IOC Code: TUR) is the governing Olympic body of Turkey was created in 1908. It is based in Istanbul.

== History ==
As one of the oldest National Olympic Committees in the world, TNOC was founded in the era of the Ottoman Empire in 1908 with the name Ottoman National Olympic Society (Turkish: Osmanlı Milli Olimpiyat Cemiyeti) and recognised by the IOC in 1911.

== Presidents ==
=== Ottoman National Olympic Society ===
| President | Term |
|---|---|
| Ahmet İhsan Tokgöz | 1908–1921 |
| Hasip Bayındırlıoğlu | 1921–1923 |

=== Turkish National Olympic Committee ===
| President | Term |
|---|---|
| Selim Sırrı Tarcan | 1923–1927 |
| Ali Sami Yen | 1927–1930 |
| Kemalettin Sami Paşa | 1930–1933 |
| Reşit Saffet Atabinen | 1933–1936 |
| Halil Bayrak | 1936–1937 |
| Adnan Menderes | 1937–1938 |
| Cemil Cahit Taner | 1938–1943 |
| Vildan Aşir Savaşır | 1943–1950 |
| Danyal Akbel | 1950–1952 |
| Cemal Alpman | 1952–1954 |
| Faik Binal | 1954–1956 |
| Nizamettin Kırşan | 1956–1958 |
| Şinasi Ataman | 1958–1959 |
| Mehmet Arkan | 1959–1960 |
| Hüsamettin Güreli | 1960 |
| Bekir Silahçılar | 1960–1962 |
| Burhan Felek | 1962–1982 |
| Raşit Serdengeçti | 1982 |
| Turgut Atakol | 1982–1988 |
| Jerfi Fıratlı | 1988–1989 |
| Sinan Erdem | 1989–2003 |
| Togay Bayatlı | 2003–2011 |
| Uğur Erdener | 2011–2025 |
| Ahmet Gülüm | 2025–present |

== Secretaries general ==
=== Ottoman National Olympic Society ===
| Secretary General | Term |
|---|---|
| Selim Sırrı Tarcan | 1908–1923 |

=== Turkish National Olympic Committee ===
| Secretary General | Term |
|---|---|
| Ali Sami Yen | 1923–1930 |
| Ekrem Rüştü Akömer | 1930–1936 |
| Nizamettin Kırşan | 1936–1938 |
| Burhan Felek | 1938–1952 |
| Ulvi Yenal | 1952–1954 |
| Suat Erler | 1955–1973 |
| Turgut Atakol | 1973–1982 |
| Sinan Erdem | 1982–1989 |
| Togay Bayatlı | 1989–2003 |
| Neşe Gündoğan | 2003– |

== Executive committee ==
The committee of the TNOC is represented by:

- President: Uğur Erdener
- Vice President: Türker Arslan, Hasan Arat, Nihat Usta
- Secretary General: Neşe Gündoğan
- Treasurer: Abdullah Özkan Mutlugil
- Members: Sezai Bağbaşı, Mustafa Keten, Seyit Bilal Porsun, Abdullah Topaloğlu, Turgay Demirel, Sema Kasapoğlu, Perviz Aran, Elif Özdemir, Ayda Uluç, Kazım Âli Kiremitçioğlu
- President of The Supreme Advisory and Disciplinary Committee: Şefik Sivrikaya

== Member federations ==
The Turkish National Federations are the organizations that coordinate all aspects of their individual sports. They are responsible for training, competition and development of their sports. There are currently 33 Olympic Summer and 5 Winter Sport Federations in Turkey.

| National Federation | Summer or Winter | Headquarters |
|---|---|---|
| Turkish Archery Federation | Summer | Çankaya, Ankara |
| Turkish Athletics Federation | Summer | Ankara |
| Turkish Badminton Federation | Summer | Keçiören. Ankara |
| Turkish Basketball Federation | Summer | Istanbul |
| Turkish Boxing Federation | Summer | Çankaya, Ankara |
| Turkish Canoe Federation | Summer | Ankara |
| Turkish Cycling Federation | Summer | Ulus, Ankara |
| Turkish Curling Federation | Summer | Ulus, Ankara |
| Turkish Developing Sports Federation | Winter | Yenişehir, Ankara |
| Turkish Equestrian Federation | Summer | Istanbul |
| Turkish Fencing Federation | Summer | Ulus, Ankara |
| Turkish Football Federation | Summer | Istanbul |
| Turkish Golf Federation | Summer | Istanbul |
| Turkish Gymnastics Federation | Summer | Ankara |
| Turkish Handball Federation | Summer | Çankaya, Ankara |
| Turkish Hockey Federation | Summer | Yenişehir, Ankara |
| Turkish Ice Hockey Federation | Winter | Çankaya, Ankara |
| Turkish Ice Skating Federation | Winter | Ankara |
| Turkish Judo Federation | Summer | Çankaya, Ankara |
| Turkish Karate Federation | Summer | Ankara |
| Turkish Luge Federation | Winter | Ulus, Ankara |
| Turkish Modern Pentathlon Federation | Summer | Ankara |
| Turkish Mountaineering Federation | Summer | Çankaya, Ankara |
| Turkish Rowing Federation | Summer | Bostancı, Istanbul |
| Turkish Rugby Federation | Summer | Yenimahalle, Ankara |
| Turkish Sailing Federation | Summer | Ulus, Ankara |
| Turkish Shooting and Hunting Federation | Summer | Ulus, Ankara |
| Turkish Skateboarding Federation | Summer | Ankara |
| Turkish Ski Federation | Winter | Ankara |
| Turkish Swimming Federation | Summer | Yenimahalle, Ankara |
| Turkish Table Tennis Association | Summer | Çankaya, Ankara |
| Turkish Tennis Association | Summer | Çankaya, Ankara |
| Turkish Taekwondo Federation | Summer | Ulus, Ankara |
| Turkish Triathlon Federation | Summer | Ankara |
| Turkish Volleyball Federation | Summer | Ankara |
| Turkish Water Polo Federation | Summer | Ulus, Ankara |
| Turkish Weightlifting Federation | Summer | Ulus, Ankara |
| Turkish Wrestling Association | Summer | Yenişehir, Ankara |

== See also ==
- Turkey at the Olympics
- Turkish National Paralympic Committee
