= Selim Sırrı Tarcan =

Turkish sports official (1874–1957)

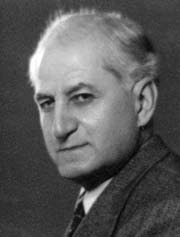
- Born: 25 March 1874; Larissa, Sanjak of Tirhala, Ottoman Empire
- Died: 2 March 1957 (aged 82); Istanbul, Turkey
- Education: Istanbul Technical University
- Occupations: Educator; sports official; politician
- Political party: CHP
- Board member of: International Olympic Committee; National Olympic Committee of Turkey

Selim Sırrı Tarcan (25 March 1874 – 2 March 1957) was a Turkish educator, sports official and politician. He is best remembered for his contribution to the establishment of the National Olympic Committee of Turkey and the introduction of the sport of volleyball in Turkey.

== Early life ==
He was born on 25 March 1874 at Larissa (Ottoman Turkish: Yenişehir-i Fener) in Thessaly (then in the Ottoman Empire) to Colonel (Ottoman Turkish: Miralay) Yusuf Bey and Zeynep Hanım. He was only two years of age when his father was killed in action as he was defending the fort of Bileća during the Battle of Vučji Do in 1876.

As he was five years old, his mother moved with him and his two older sisters to Istanbul, where his uncle from his mother's side was a military staff officer. After his uncle Rıfat Pasha was exiled to Fezzan in Ottoman Tripolitania due to opposition to the Sultan Abdul Hamid II (reigned 1876–1909), her mother registered Selim Sırrı in 1882 as a boarding pupil at the private Galatasaray High School. He was educated eight years in the French language school. Because of financial problems, he had to transfer in 1890 to the no-fee boarding school of "Mühendishane-i Berrî-i Hümâyûn" (literally: Royal Technical School of Naval Engineering), which developed later to Istanbul Technical University.

In his unpublished memoirs, he describes himself as someone, who was highly interested in physical education all the time during his youth. To this activity, he was incited by Ali Faik Bey (Üstünidman), his instructor at Galatasaray High School. During his school years, he was the most successful pupil in physical education. He was awarded for his gymnastics skills much to disappointment of his mother, who wished he better was successful in his regular lessons. Selim Sırrı performed gymnastics and bodybuilding also on weekends at home along with some friends in order to achieve a better physique.

Selim Sırrı is credited with being the first footballer of Turkish origin. As a member of the Football Club Smyrna, he played 1898 in four matches between regular teams at Bornova Field in İzmir.

== Olympic Committee ==
Pierre de Coubertin, founder of the International Olympic Committee (IOC) desired Turkey's accession to the IOC for participation at the modern Olympic Games, which was held first in 1896. During his visit to Istanbul in 1907, he became acquainted with Selim Sırrı Bey via his friend Frenchman Juery, a teacher at the Galatasaray High School. Selim Sırrı Bey was asked by Pierre de Coubertin to form the National Olympic Committee of Turkey. Working as an instructor of physical education at a school in İzmir and writing sports articles in the magazine Servet-i Fünun, he had to wait for the establishment of the National Committee until the declaration of the Second Constitutional Monarchy in 1908 due to the political situation in the Ottoman Empire.

Ahmet İhsan Bey (Tokgöz), publisher of the magazine Servet-i Fünun and a former sportsman, was named the first president and Selim Sırrı Bey the first secretary general of the Turkish committee. In May 1909, Selim Sırrı Bey represented Turkey at the 1909 IOC session held in Berlin, Germany. Turkey was admitted to the IOC in 1911.

By the end of World War I in 1918, Turkey was banished from the IOC due to its involvement in the war alongside of Germany. As a result of this development, Turkey was not allowed to participate at the 1920 Summer Olympics held in Antwerp, Belgium. The National Olympic Committee of Turkey dissolved.

In 1921, Turkey was re-admitted to the IOC with the votes of Hungary and Pierre de Coubertin. Thereupon, Selim Sırrı Bey re-established the National Committee in 1922. He was elected the chairman of the national committee, and served at this position until his resignation in 1926, after receiving heavy criticism from the Turkish Gymnastics Federation (Turkish: Türkiye İdman Cemiyeti İttifakı) due to his strong views on amateurship in sports. Finally in 1930, he stepped down also from his post at the IOC.

== Youth anthem ==
In 1909, Selim Sırrı Bey went to the Higher Institute of Physical Education in Sweden to study physical education and gymnastics. He returned home following his graduation in 1910. He began then to work as a school instructor for physical education.

By his return, he had brought some scores of Swedish songs from Felix Körling's collection, among them the Swedish folk music titled Tre trallande jäntor ("Three carolling girls"). This folk music became the Gençlik Marşı (literally: "Youth Anthem") known as "Dağ Başını Duman Almış" in 1917 with Turkish lyrics written by Ali Ulvi Bey (Elöve).

== Contribution to youth and sports ==
Selim Sırrı Tarcan worked as an instructor for physical education at various high schools until the proclamation of Turkish Republic in 1923. He was promoted 1931 to Head Inspector of Physical Education in the Ministry of National Education. He served at this function until his retirement in 1935.

He initiated establishment of reoccurring gymnastics festivals in 1916, which were the basis of today's events held on 19 May, the Commemoration of Atatürk, Youth and Sports Day.

Selim Sırrı Tarcan is credited with being the pioneer of volleyball in Turkey as he taught the basics of this sport to instructors between 1920 and 1924, providing the necessary infrastructure for future development.

With more than thirty article he wrote in the journal Gürbüz Türk Çocuğu (literally: "Robust Turkish Child"), Tarcan informed Republican society about modern physical education, sports, gymnastic and games to evaluate children in terms of their mental and physical development and education.

He wrote 58 books, about 2,500 articles and gave about 1,530 lectures, most of them sports related.

== Political life ==
After his retirement from the post of head inspector, Tarcan entered politics in the general elections held on 8 February 1935, running for a seat in the parliament from the Republican People's Party, the only political party at that time. He was re-elected twice more in 1939 and 1943 as deputy of Ordu.

== Death ==
Selim Sırrı Tarcan died on 2 March 1957 in Istanbul at the age of 82.

== Legacy ==
A volleyball venue in Ankara, the Selim Sırrı Tarcan Sport Hall, is named in honor of him. The sports hall of the Galatasaray High School bears also his name.

The Gülbağ Selim Sırrı Tarcan İ.Ö.O., a primary education school in Şişli, Istanbul is named also after him.

== Media ==
Gençlik Marşı (Youth Anthem) "Dağ Başını Duman Almış"
Instrumental
