= Acıbadem Healthcare Group =

Hospital in Üsküdar, İstanbul

Acıbadem Sağlık Grubu
- Acıbadem Healthcare Group

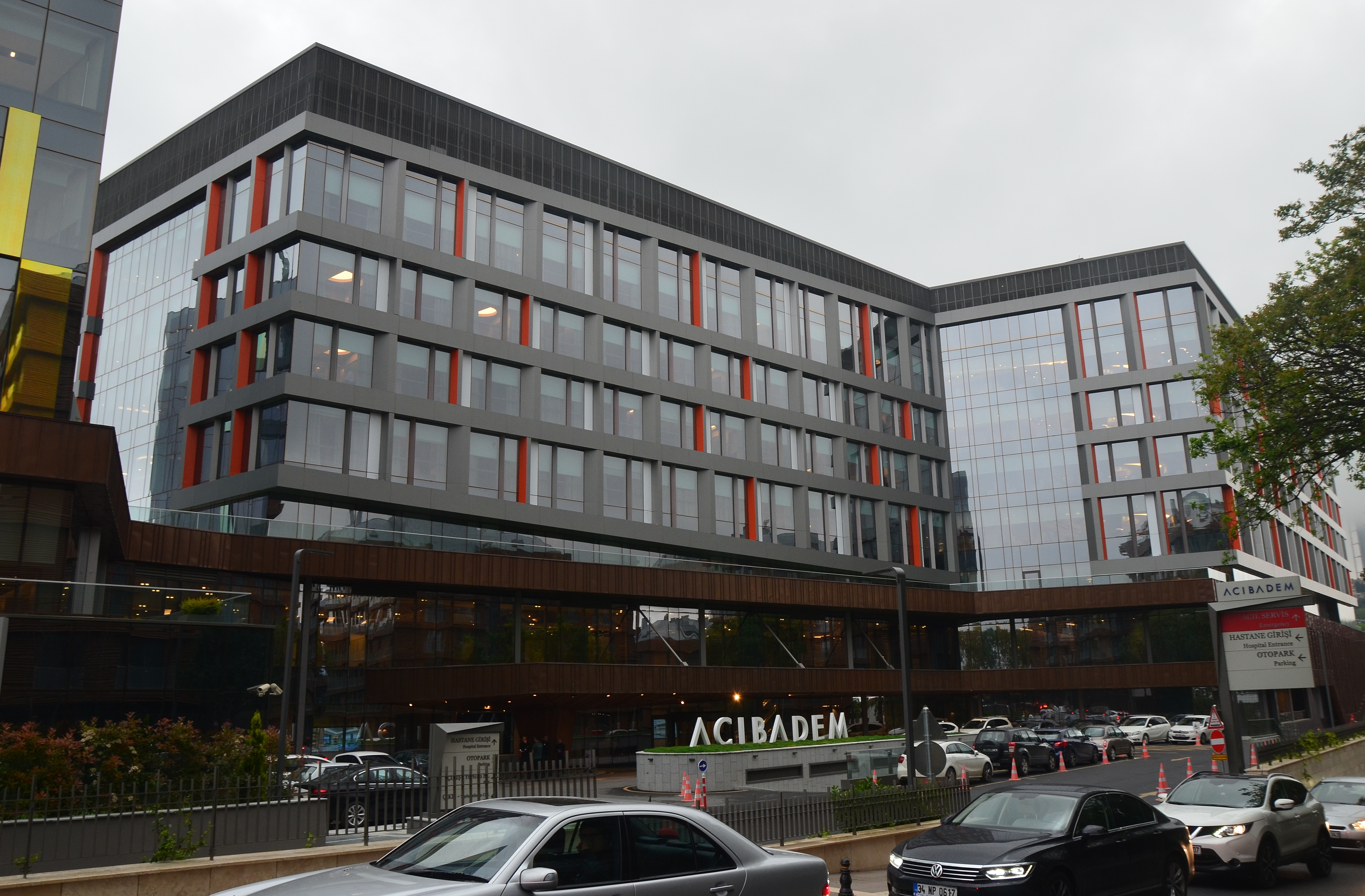
- Acıbadem Hospital in the Altunizade neighborhood of Üsküdar, Istanbul

Geography
- Location: 30 hospitals worldwide and 18 medical centers in Istanbul, Bursa, Ankara,Adana, Kayseri, Eskişehir, Muğla, İzmir, Amsterdam, Rotterdam, Sofia, Varna, Skopje, Belgrade

Organisation
- Care system: Private
- Type: Joint Stock Company
- Affiliated university: Acıbadem University School of Medicine
- Network: Joint Commission (JCAHO)

History
- Founded: 1991; 35 years ago

Links
- Website: acibademinternational.com

The Acıbadem Healthcare Group (Turkish: Acıbadem Sağlık Grubu) is a Malaysia-based IHH Healthcare owned Turkish healthcare network. It comprises 29 hospitals and 15 medical centers, along with outpatient clinics and laboratories.

Acıbadem has hospitals in Istanbul, Bursa, Ankara, Adana, Kayseri, Eskişehir, İzmir, Muğla, Amsterdam, Rotterdam, Sofia, Varna, Skopje, and Belgrade.

== History ==
The company was founded in 1991 by Mehmet Ali Aydınlar. Aydınlar is still the Chairman of the group. The group expanded rapidly within Türkiye, opening major hospitals in Istanbul, including Acıbadem Altunizade, Bakırköy, Maslak, Kadiköy, Kozyatağı, Ataşehir, International, Atakent, Taksim, Kartal and Fulya. It later established hospitals in other cities such as Bursa, Bodrum, Adana, Kayseri, and Ankara, creating a nationwide network. The group also developed specialized centers for oncology, organ transplantation, and robotic surgery, alongside continuous upgrades and expansions of its facilities.

Logo of Acıbadem Healthcare

Acıbadem offered its shares in a public offering in 2000 and put the funds received towards new investments to increase its capacity.

IHH Healthcare acquired a majority stake in Acıbadem in 2011, initially taking a 60% share. Following share conversions in 2018, IHH increased its ownership to approximately 90%, a development reported by business media such as The Edge Malaysia.

In 2016, Acıbadem expanded into Bulgaria through the acquisition of the Tokuda Group and a majority stake in the City Clinic Group, adding multiple hospitals and medical centers. In the same year, the group entered North Macedonia by acquiring Sistina Hospital, a leading private healthcare provider. In 2017, Acıbadem opened the Acıbadem International Medical Center in Amsterdam, the Netherlands, as a newly established outpatient and diagnostic facility. In 2019, the group established Acıbadem Bel Medic in Serbia through acquisition, expanding its network of clinics and hospitals.

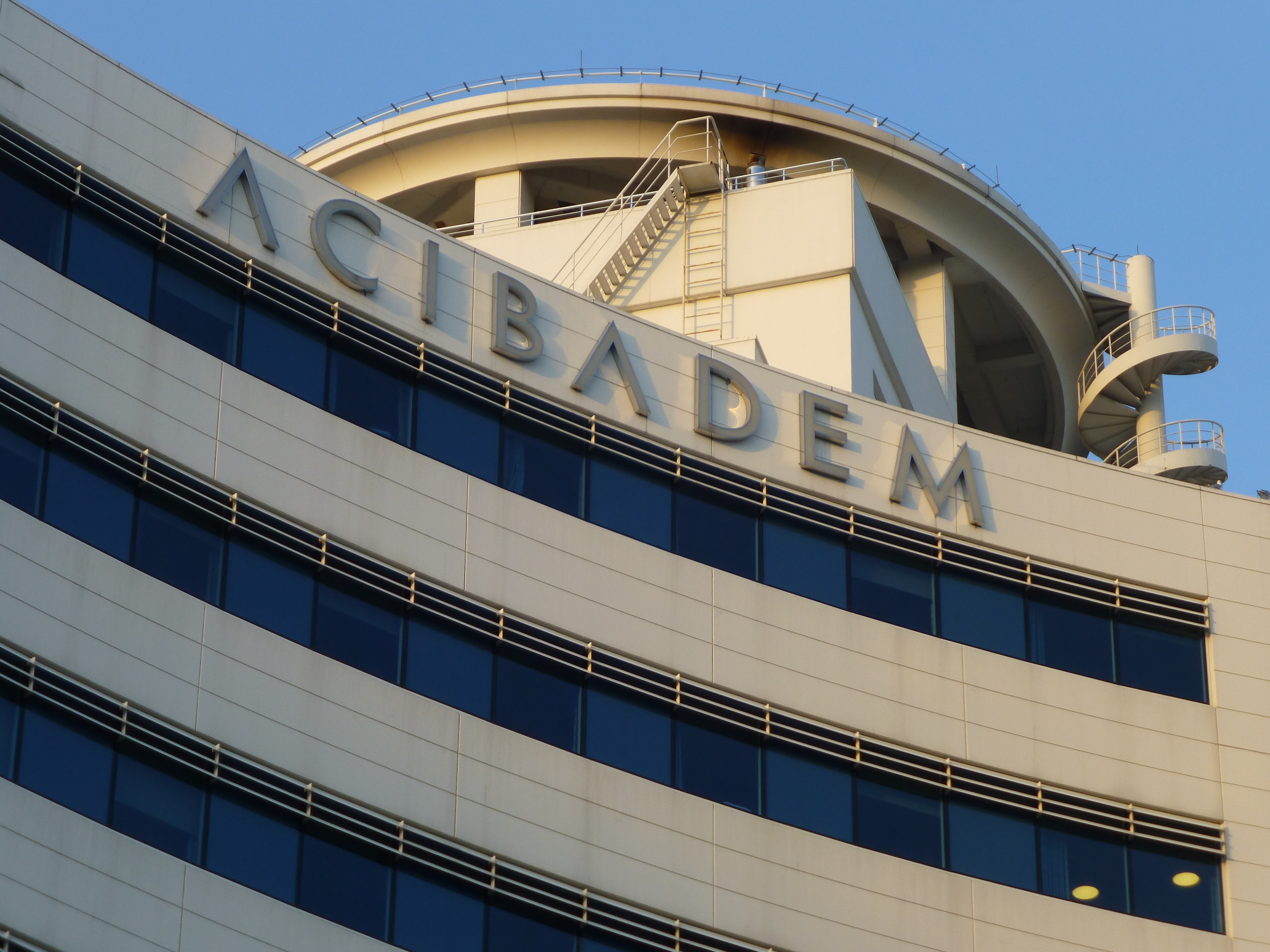
Acıbadem Fulya Hospital

== Services and facilities ==
Acıbadem Hospitals Group provides interpretation services, including accompanying appointments and translating patient education materials. Interpretation services provided in 25 different languages including English, Persian, Arabic, Bosnian, Georgian, Spanish, German, Serbian and Russian.

Acıbadem maintains a communications network between the Hospital Information Communication System, in which all the medical records of patients are stored in Acıbadem Hospitals.

=== Oncology and advanced radiotherapy ===
The oncology departments are recognized for integrating sophisticated radiation therapy with surgical precision across several specialized cancer centers. These facilities provide medical oncology, radiation oncology, and oncologic surgery, with a heavy emphasis on neuro-oncology, breast health, and pediatric oncology. The group utilizes advanced systems such as the Gamma Knife Icon for intracranial lesions and the CyberKnife for robotic radiosurgery throughout the body. Furthermore, the inclusion of MR-LINAC technology allows for real-time imaging during radiation therapy by combining MRI with a linear accelerator, complemented by TrueBeam and TomoTherapy platforms. Ethos radiotherapy system, incorporating artificial intelligence (AI) into cancer treatment. This state-of-the-art machine serves both as a CT scanner providing images while the patient is on the table and a linear accelerator delivering precise radiation doses.

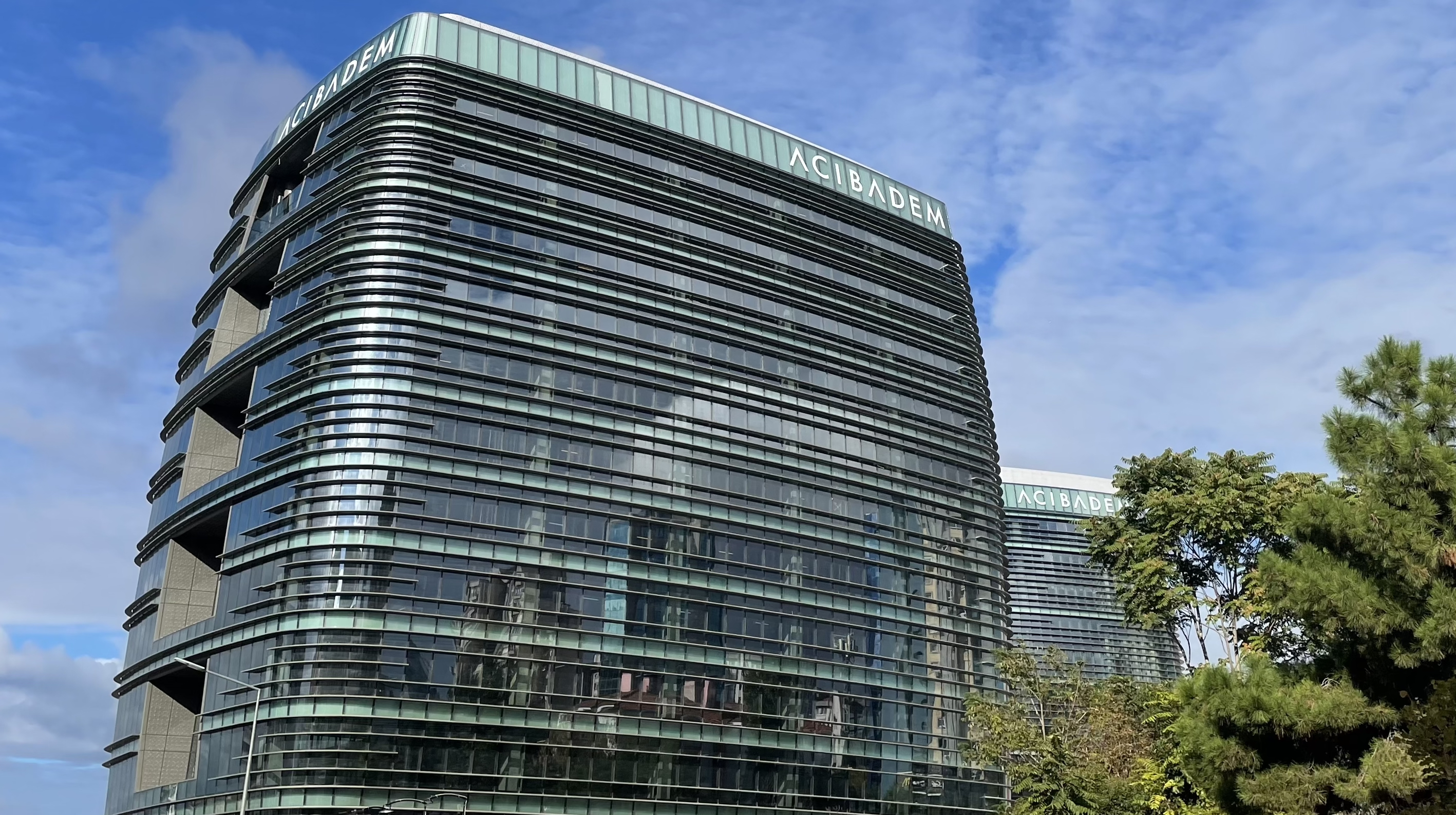
Acıbadem Headquarters and Hospital in Istanbul

=== Cardiology and cardiovascular surgery ===
Acıbadem’s heart care centers offer a full spectrum of services ranging from interventional cardiology to complex pediatric and adult cardiac surgeries. The department is internationally noted for performing the Ozaki Procedure, a specialized aortic valve reconstruction using the patient’s own tissue, as well as Transcatheter Aortic Valve Implantation (TAVI) and robotic-assisted bypass surgery. It also serves as a major regional reference center for neonatal cardiac surgery and the treatment of congenital heart defects.

=== Sports medicine ===
The group's sports medicine services are centralized at Acıbadem Fulya Hospital, which is officially recognized as a FIFA Medical Centre of Excellence. This center provides performance analysis, injury prevention, and rehabilitation for both professional and amateur athletes. The facility is equipped with specialized infrastructure, including anti-gravity treadmills, indoor aquatic therapy pools, and a whole-body cryotherapy chamber that operates at -110°C to assist in muscle recovery and inflammation reduction.

Acıbadem maintains a communications network between the Hospital Information Communication System, in which all the medical records of patients are stored in Acıbadem Hospitals.

=== In vitro fertilization (IVF) and reproductive health ===
Established in 1998, Acıbadem's IVF centers have grown to become some of the most active in the region, treating over 15,000 families annually. These centers employ advanced reproductive technologies such as Micro-TESE (testicular sperm extraction) and Preimplantation Genetic Diagnosis (PGD). They also maintain high-standard embryo freezing programs to support a wide range of family planning needs.

=== Organ transplantation ===
The group operates specialized transplant centers for liver, kidney, and bone marrow (both autologous and allogeneic) transplantations. For kidney transplants, the group frequently utilizes laparoscopic and robotic-assisted techniques to minimize donor and recipient recovery times.

=== Robotic surgery ===
Acıbadem has integrated the da Vinci Xi robotic surgical system across multiple departments, including urology, gynecology, general surgery, and cardiothoracic surgery. In orthopedics, the Mako robotic system is used for high-precision hip and knee replacement surgeries.

=== Other medical departments ===
Beyond its primary centers of excellence, Acıbadem maintains comprehensive departments in neurosurgery, focusing on spinal surgery and functional neurosurgery for conditions like epilepsy and Parkinson’s. The orthopedics and traumatology units specialize in hand, foot, and ankle surgeries, while the preventive medicine department offers personalized check-up packages. Additionally, the group provides extensive services in dermatology and aesthetic surgery.

=== Acıbadem Mehmet Ali Aydınlar University ===
Acıbadem Mehmet Ali Aydınlar University is a private university in Istanbul, Turkey, founded in 2007 and affiliated with the Acıbadem Healthcare Group. The university’s core health-related faculties include the Faculty of Medicine, the Faculty of Health Sciences, the Faculty of Pharmacy, the Faculty of Dentistry and the Faculty of Engineering, which offers health-focused programmes such as biomedical engineering. The institution operates an advanced Research and Education Hospital and maintains multiple specialised laboratories and research centres to support clinical training and biomedical research. As of 2023 the university reported 5,989 students across undergraduate, associate and postgraduate programmes and 571 academic staff.

=== Healthcare ecosystem ===
Acıbadem Healthcare Group operates an integrated healthcare ecosystem that combines hospitals and outpatient clinics with supporting institutions in education, diagnostics, technology, and facility services. The model includes Acıbadem University, which provides medical and health sciences education, as well as laboratory and biobanking services such as Acıbadem Labmed, Labvital, and LabCell.

Additional subsidiaries support clinical and operational functions, including Acıbadem Technology, which develops hospital information systems; APlus, which provides facility management services; and Acıbadem Mobile, which delivers emergency and home healthcare. The ecosystem also includes project management services for hospital planning and development.

== Quality studies ==
Several hospitals within the Acıbadem Healthcare Group hold internationally recognized accreditations. The group reports multiple Joint Commission International (JCI) accreditations among its hospitals and operates Labmed, its laboratory network, which has been certified to ISO 15189 medical laboratory standards. Individual units and support services at some facilities have also held ISO 9001 certification for quality management and related operational standards.

Acıbadem participates in national and regional quality and improvement programmes, including membership of organisations such as the European Foundation for Quality Management (EFQM) and the Turkish quality association KALDER, and states that its hospitals operate in compliance with Turkish Ministry of Health regulations and national standards.

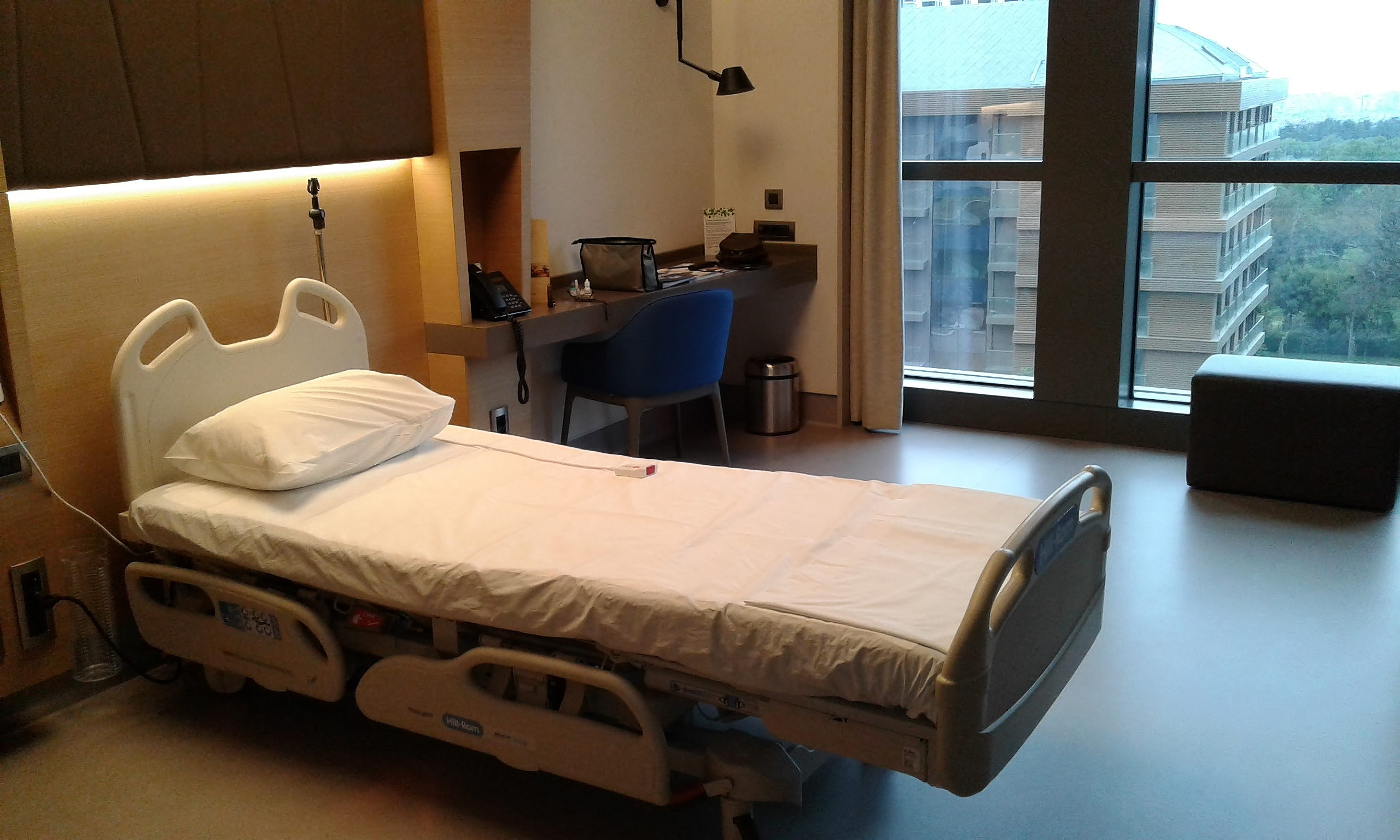
A sick room of the Acıbadem Altunizade Hospital

=== Joint Commission International accreditation ===
Joint Commission International (JCI) is an independent, international organization which determines the quality standards for healthcare. All institutions of the Acıbadem Healthcare Group have qualified to receive JCI accreditation.

== International cooperation ==
In 2003 Acıbadem registered to the services of Harvard Medical International (currently Partners Harvard Medical International).

In 2004, Acıbadem Healthcare Group signed a cooperation agreement with Labmed Dortmund GmbH, who had been active in Germany for 25 years.

=== International Patient Center ===
Acıbadem Healthcare Group provides medical tourism services through its International Patient Center, offering coordinated support for patients traveling to Turkey for treatment. The center functions as a one-stop service unit, assisting patients from initial inquiry through post-treatment return arrangements.

Services typically include treatment planning, travel coordination, airport reception, private transfers, and multilingual assistance at hospital-based health desks. By 2026 Acıbadem has more than 50 information offices outside of Turkey and support treatment within 20 different languages.

== See also ==
- Acıbadem University
- Acıbadem University School of Medicine
- Rezan Topaloğlu
