= Sinan Erdem =

Turkish volleyball player (1927–2003)

Personal information
- Nationality: Turkish
- Born: May 9, 1927 Manisa, Turkey
- Died: July 23, 2003 (aged 76)

Sport
- Country: Turkey
- Sport: Volleyball
- Team: Galatasaray, Turkey national team
- Turned pro: 1949

Sinan Erdem (May 9, 1927 – July 23, 2003) was a Turkish volleyball player and long-standing head of the Turkish Olympic Committee.

== Biography ==
He was born on May 9, 1927, in Manisa, Turkey. After finishing the high school in Galatasaray High School, he was educated in Law at Istanbul University.

Sinan started to play volleyball and tennis already in 1943. He became a professional player in 1949, and transferred in 1951 to the volleyball team of Galatasaray S.K. He played 12 times in the Turkey national team and became its captain. After leaving the active sport, he served as the coach of the national volleyball team.

Between 1957 and 1967, Sinan Erdem served as the secretary general of the Turkish Volleyball Federation. A member of the International Volleyball Federation (FIVB) since 1966, he served as the head of the organization committee of FIVB between 1972 and 1984. He was the deputy secretary general of the Turkish National Olympic Committee (TMOK) since 1975, before serving as the secretary general from 1982 to 1989. In 1989, Sinan Erdem was appointed chairman of the TMOK, a position he had until his death.

He was elected to the board of directors of the Islamic Games Confederation in 1982, the Mediterranean Games and the International Olympic Committee (IOC) in 1988. During the Olympic games in Seoul, Barcelona, Atlanta and in Sydney, he served as a member of the IOC.

He died of liver cancer on July 23, 2003. He was survived by his wife Süheyla, his son Ziya and his daughter Zeynep.

Erdem's greatest ideal was that Turkey and Istanbul host once the Olympic Games. Turkey's biggest sport arena Sinan Erdem Dome is named in his commemoration.

== Honorary doctorates ==
- 1998 - Anadolu University
- 1999 - Marmara University

== Awards ==
- Golden Order of the Ministry of the Sports of France
- Loyalty Award of the International Olympic Committee
- Order of Japan awarded by Emperor Akihito of Japan
- Order of France by the President of France
