= Turkish Football Federation =

Governing body of association football in Turkey

UEFA
- Full name: Türkiye Futbol Federasyonu
- Short name: TFF
- Founded: 23 April 1923; 103 years ago
- Headquarters: TFF Riva Facility
- Location: Riva, Istanbul
- Membership: FIFA; UEFA
- FIFA affiliation: 21 May 1923; 103 years ago
- UEFA affiliation: 16 April 1962; 64 years ago
- President: İbrahim Hacıosmanoğlu
- Website: www.tff.org

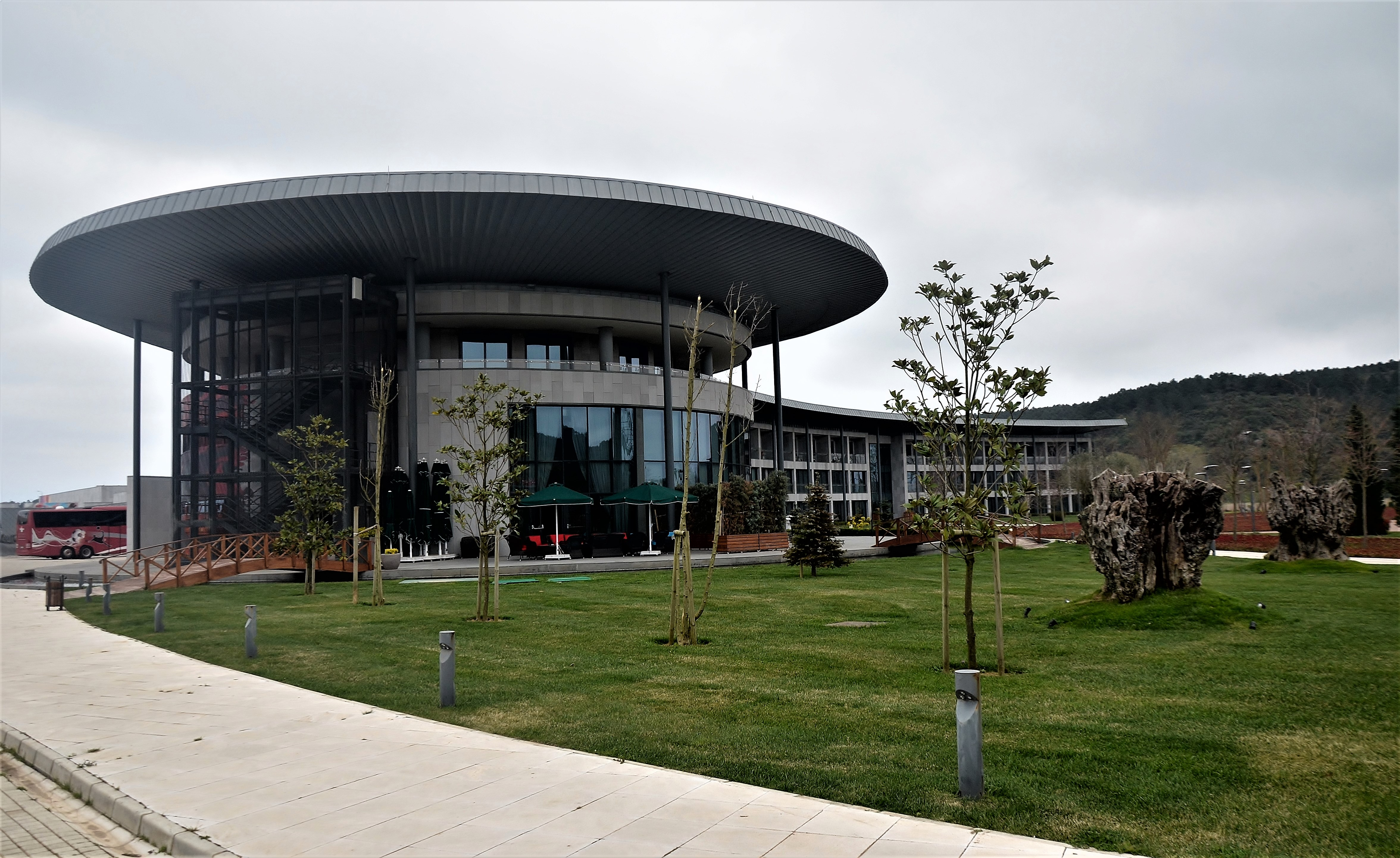
Turkish Football Federation Facility at Riva, Beykoz in Istanbul

The Turkish Football Federation (Turkish: Türkiye Futbol Federasyonu; TFF) is the governing body of association football in Turkey. It was formed on 23 April 1923, and joined FIFA on 21 May 1923 and UEFA on 16 April 1962. It organizes the Turkey national football team, the Turkish Football League and the Turkish Cup.

== Governed competitions ==
=== Leagues ===
The Turkish football league system is divided into eight tiers, ranging from the top-tier Süper Lig to local amateur divisions.

=== Cups ===
The Turkish Cup changed its name to the Federation Cup (Turkish: Federasyon Kupası) in the 1980–81 season, then back to Turkish Cup in 1992–93.

== History ==
=== Hosting bids ===
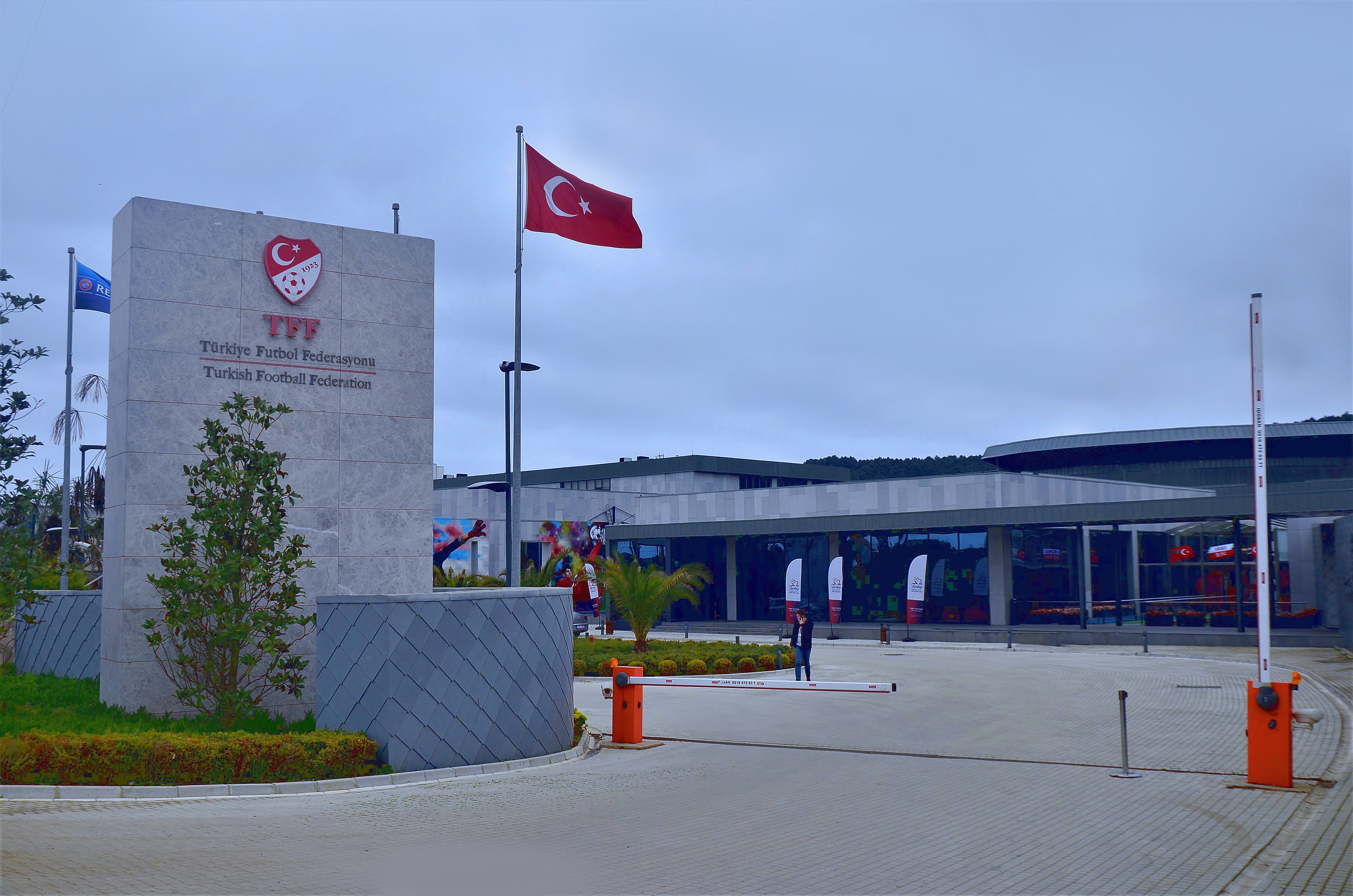
Turkish Football Federation's Hasan Doğan National Teams Camp and Training Facility at Riva, Beykoz in Istanbul

Turkey have bid five times to host the UEFA European Championship.

Turkey submitted a joint bid with Greece for UEFA Euro 2008, which failed. Their bid for UEFA Euro 2012 was also unsuccessful, with the competition going to Poland and Ukraine. The federation also submitted a bid to host UEFA Euro 2016, but UEFA announced that Euro 2016 would be hosted by France. Turkey were also bidding for UEFA Euro 2024, competing against Germany. Germany were announced the hosts. Turkey will host the UEFA Euro 2032, alongside Italy (both previously bid against each other for 2016), given Turkey to finally host a UEFA Euro on their fifth attempt.

Turkey had already hosted the 2005 UEFA Champions League Final, the 2023 UEFA Champions League Final, and the 2009 UEFA Cup Final all played in Istanbul. At the youth-level, they hosted the UEFA European Under-17 Football Championship in 2008, after first hosting the event back in 1993.

== Controversies ==
=== Denial of former national championships ===
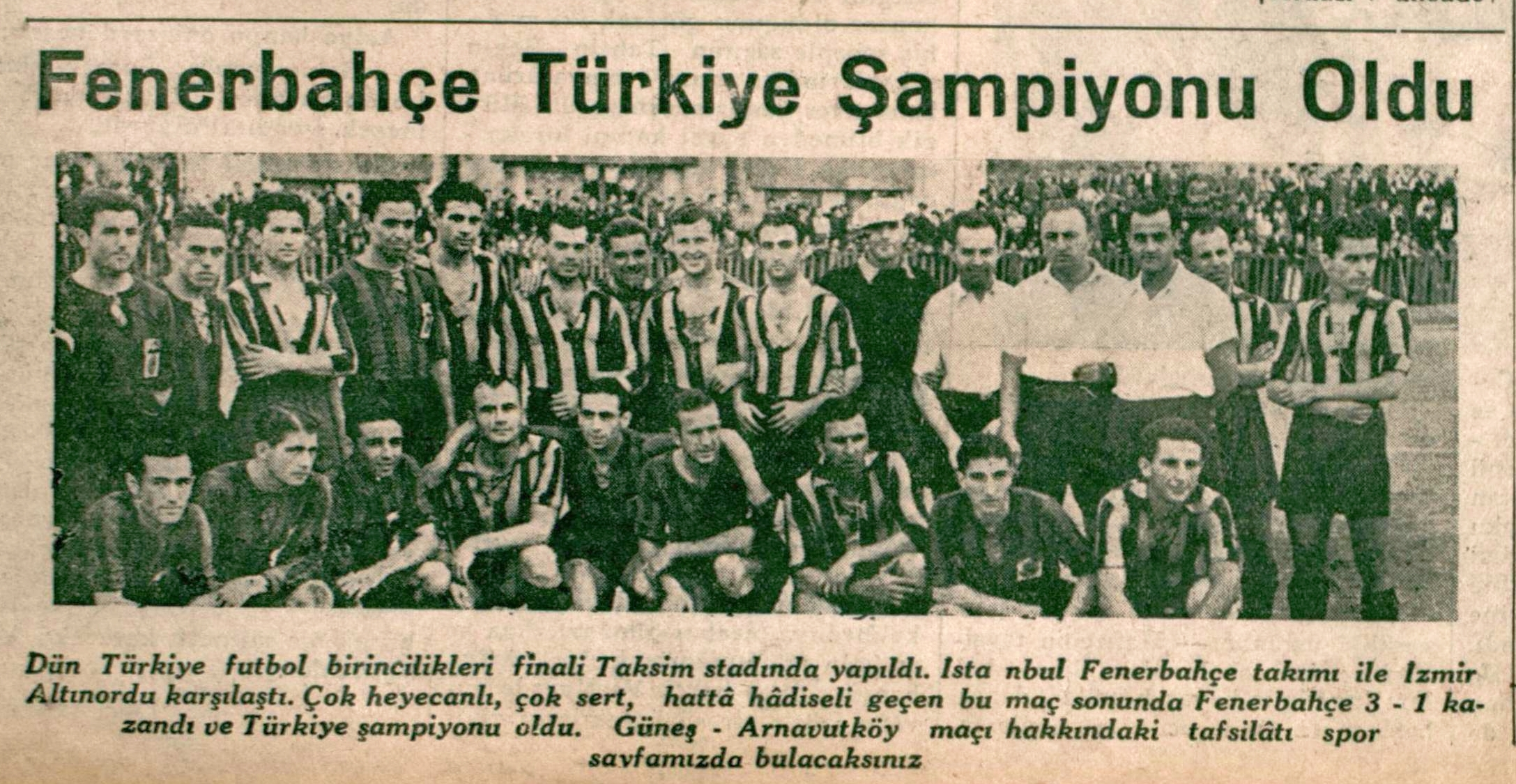
Turkish newspaper Tan announcing the Turkish championship (Türkiye Şampiyonu) title of Fenerbahçe on 9 September 1935

The TFF organized a nationwide championship as early as 1924. That year the Turkish Football Championship (Turkish: Türkiye Futbol Şampiyonası) was held in order to bring forth a national football champion. The championship format was based on a knockout competition, contested between the winners of each of the country's regional leagues. Some years later, in 1937, the first national league called Millî Küme was introduced. The league was held until 1950, one year before the Turkish Football Championship was also abolished.

Even though both competitions were organized by the TFF and were official championships respectively, they are not acknowledged and counted by the very same federation which held them. Until today no official reason or motive was given for the unparalleled and irregular denial. All other football associations in Europe without exception consequently acknowledge their former national championships. The Turkish Federation is the only one with such a stance.

As a result, Ankara Demirspor became the first club to officially demand that the federation acknowledge their championship title won in 1947, but received no answer at all to date. Club president Nuğman Yavuz stated that he contacted the Turkish Federation twice, but the federation did not respond in any way. Similarly, Fenerbahçe also requested proper acknowledgement of these national championship titles, and faced the same unconstructive reaction. Having won a total of nine titles in both former championships, the club demands to have those official titles rightfully acknowledged.

For instance, Mehmet Demirkol, a renowned sports writer and commentator, stated that Beşiktaş won their 20th championship title overall in the 2016–17 season, not their 15th. Numerous other sports writers, persons of authority, politicians, and officials also openly expressed their opinions on this issue and reinforced the view that the Turkish federation should unambiguously acknowledge and count the former championship titles. Among them is also historian and headmaster of the Galatasaray High School Vahdettin Engin and Turkish football expert Ahmet Çakar.

According to historians' analysis of the 2002 Turkish Football Federation Arbitration Board (tahkim kurulu) decision, which stated that the Turkish League Championships began before 1959 and the championships before 1959 cannot be left uncounted.

In addition to requesting acknowledgement of the titles, Fenerbahçe's kit for the 2023–24 season includes a badge with 5 stars above which can't be worn in league matches because it is against the regulations of the federation and they did not give permission to play with them, likely in the hopes that the TFF will recognize their pre-1959 championships, also notably on the club's website the 28 championships are listed as if they were official likely as an act of protest against the TFF's lack of recognition of the pre-1959 titles.

Fenerbahçe filed a lawsuit against Turkey (Turkish Football Federation) at the European Court of Human Rights in October 2023. As a result, the European Court of Human Rights initiated preliminary proceedings against Turkey (Turkish Football Federation) in March 2025. According to the initial assessment of a Turkish lawyer, Fenerbahçe's rights have been violated (Right to property of championship titles and Right to a fair trial).

=== Biased Professional Football Disciplinary Committee (PFDK) ===
In July 2024, İbrahim Hacıosmanoğlu was elected president of the Turkish Football Federation (TFF). He appointed Celal Nuri Demirtürk as President of the Professional Football Disciplinary Committee (PFDK) of the TFF. In the same month, a Turkish media outlet revealed that Demirtürk is a fanatical supporter of Galatasaray Istanbul. In addition, Mr Demirtürk acted in the past as a legal counsel in 2002 for a Turkish football referee who was arrested in connection with match-fixing and betting.

Following a leak of the ‘hostile’ WhatsApp conversations of the PFDK board in June 2025, Fenerbahçe filed a complaint with the Turkish Football Federation. PFDK President Demirtürk and other board members submitted their resignations following the publication of the WhatsApp conversations. In the WhatsApp conversations, they showed their bias in favour of Galatasaray, their feelings of revenge and threatened Galatasaray's arch-rival football coach that if he continued to cause trouble next season, they would get back at him. They also patronisingly ridiculed Galatasaray's arch-rivals Fenerbahçe. For Fenerbahçe, this shows Demirtürk's bias and casts doubt on his impartiality, justice and equality as PFDK president.

In the same month, the resignations of Demirtürk, his deputy and reporting member were accepted and a new PFDK president was appointed by the TFF half a week later.

=== 2011 Turkish sports corruption scandal ===
In the summer of 2011, Turkish police began an investigation into 19 football matches suspected of being fixed, and by 10 July 61 individuals had been arrested, including club managers and Turkish national team players. 26 of these would later have requests for release refused by the court. By 12 July UEFA had confirmed they were monitoring the situation. Accusations included attempts to fix matches to influence league standings. Beşiktaş president Yıldırım Demirören later returned the Turkish Cup following match-fixing allegations levelled at his own club.

On 6 November 2020, the Turkish court declared all suspects innocent. The trial was held in the Istanbul 13th Heavy Penal Court after the appeals court overturned another acquittal verdict in January by a lower court for all the suspects. During the trial, 19 suspects were declared innocent due to the lack of evidence. Being one of the clubs which were acquitted of the accusations, Fenerbahçe demand €135 million from UEFA and TFF in the context of a claim for damages.

In hindsight, the Turkish court case turned out to be a plot against Fenerbahçe president Yıldırım orchestrated by the Fethullahist Terror Organization (FETÖ). Legal proceedings were initiated against Lutfi Arıboğan, vice-president of the TFF and a member of Galatasaray S.K., on charges on acting as an accomplice to FETÖ.

=== 2023 melee during MKE Ankaragücü-Çaykur Rizespor match ===
On 11 December 2023, a melee occurred during a match between MKE Ankaragücü and Çaykur Rizespor, in which fans being invaded the playing field's pitch. Six people, including MKE Ankaragucum club president Faruk Koca, were arrested for assaulting a referee. The referee, Halil Umut Meler, was hospitalized following the assault.

The next day, Koca resigned from MKE Ankaragucu, and the Turkish Football Federation decided to suspend all league games in Turkey indefinitely. Meler, who suffered a minor facial facture and eye injury, was discharged from the hospital on 13 December. The same day, it was announced that the suspension of league games would end on 19 December 2023.

On 14 December 2023, the TFF announced that Koca had been banned permanently for punching Meler. Ankaragücü were fined two million lira (£54,000) and ordered to play five home games without any fans.

Koca stood trial on 9 January 2024 on charges of injuring a public official, threatening an official, and violating a law relating to the prevention of violence in sports. On 11 November, Koca was convicted and sentenced to 3.5 years' imprisonment. He was released on bail, 16 days later pending trial on 27 December 2023.

=== 2025 Turkish referee betting scandal ===
In October 2025, the Turkish Football Federation uncovered a major betting scandal involving widespread illegal gambling by professional referees, severely damaging the credibility of Turkish football. An audit revealed that 371 of 571 active referees held betting accounts, with 152 actively betting on matches, violating FIFA and UEFA rules. The findings included 7 Süper Lig main referees, 15 Süper Lig assistant referees, 36 regional referees, and 94 regional assistants, with some placing over 10,000 bets. TFF President İbrahim Hacıosmanoğlu called it a "milestone" and reported the issue to FIFA and UEFA, with potential lifetime bans looming. The TFF planned a nationwide referee training program to restore integrity.

== Medals (1923–2024) ==
As of 1 April 2024

Turkish Football Federation gain 45 medals of 900 events.

Event	Gold	Silver	Bronze	Total
Football
FIFA World Cup	0	0	1	1/22
FIFA U-20 World Cup	0	0	0	0/23
FIFA U-17 World Cup	0	0	0	0/19
FIFA Club World Cup	0	0	0	0/20
FIFA Confederations Cup (1992–2017)	0	0	1	1/10
FIFA Women's World Cup	0	0	0	0/8
FIFA U-20 Women's World Cup	0	0	0	0/10
FIFA U-17 Women's World Cup	0	0	0	0/7
FIFA Women's Club World Cup	0	0	0	0/0
UEFA European Championship	0	0	1	1/16
UEFA European Under-21 Championship	0	0	0	0/27
UEFA European Under-19 Championship	1	2	2	5/68
UEFA European Under-17 Championship	2	0	1	3/39
UEFA Nations League	0	0	0	0/3
UEFA Women's Nations League	0	0	0	0/1
UEFA Women's Championship	0	0	0	0/13
UEFA Women's Under-19 Championship	0	0	0	0/24
UEFA Women's Under-17 Championship	0	0	0	0/14
UEFA–CAF Meridian Cup (1997–2007)	0	0	1	1/5
Under 20 Elite League	0	0	0	0/5
Football at the Summer Olympics	0	0	0	0/36
Football at the Mediterranean Games	1	7	2	10/19
Football at the Islamic Solidarity Games	1	0	1	2/4
UEFA Champions League	0	0	1	1/69
UEFA Europa League	1	0	1	2/53
UEFA Super Cup	1	0	0	1/48
UEFA Conference League	0	0	0	0/2
UEFA Youth League	0	0	0	0/10
UEFA Cup Winners' Cup (1960–1999)	0	0	0	0/39
UEFA Women's Champions League	0	0	0	0/23
UEFA Regions' Cup	0	0	3	3/12
UEFA Amateur Cup (1967–1978)	0	0	0	0/4
FENIX Trophy (2021–2025)	0	0	0	0/3
Balkan Cup (1929–1980)	0	1	0	1/11
Balkans Cup (1961–1994)	3	1	3	7/27
ECO Cup (1965–1993)	3	2	0	5/6
Futsal
FIFA Futsal World Cup	0	0	0	0/10
FIFA Futsal Women's World Cup	0	0	0	0/0
UEFA Futsal Championship	0	0	0	0/12
UEFA Futsal Under-21 Championship (2008)	0	0	0	0/1
UEFA Futsal Under-19 Championship	0	0	0	0/3
UEFA Women's Futsal Championship	0	0	0	0/3
UEFA Futsal Champions League	0	0	0	0/23
Futsal European Clubs Championship	0	0	0	0/15
European Futsal Cup Winners Cup	0	0	0	0/6
European Women's Futsal Tournament	0	0	0	0/6
Beach Soccer
FIFA Beach Soccer World Cup	0	0	0	0/12
Beach Soccer World Championships (1995–2004)	0	0	0	0/10
FIFA Beach Soccer World Cup qualification (UEFA)	0	0	0	0/8
Euro Beach Soccer League	0	0	0	0/26
Euro Beach Soccer Cup	0	0	0	0/15
Euro Winners Cup	0	0	1	1/11
Women's Euro Winners Cup	0	0	0	0/8
Beach Soccer at the European Games	0	0	0	0/4
World Beach Games	0	0	0	0/2
Mediterranean Beach Games	0	0	0	0/3
eSports
FIFA eWorld Cup	0	0	0	0/17
Total	12	14	19	45/900

== Presidents ==
As of 18 July 2024

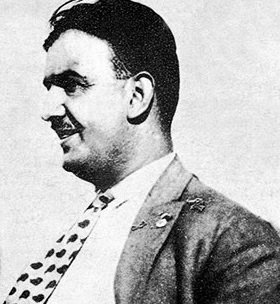
Former Turkish footballer, referee and the 3rd president of Galatasaray, Yusuf Ziya Öniş, was the first president of TFF between 1922 and 1926.

Nat.	Name	Years
(Turkey)	Yusuf Ziya Öniş	1922–1926
(Turkey)	Muvaffak Menemencioğlu	1926–1931
(Turkey)	Hamdi Emin Çap	1931–1937
(Turkey)	Sedat Rıza İstek	1937–1938
(Turkey)	Danyal Akbel	1938–1943
(Turkey)	Ziya Ateş	1943
(Turkey)	Sadi Karsan	1943–1948
(Turkey)	Vildan Aşir Savaşır	1948–1949
(Turkey)	Ulvi Ziya Yenal	1949–1952
(Turkey)	Mehmet Arkan	1952
(Turkey)	Mümtaz Tarhan	1952
(Turkey)	Orhan Şeref Apak	1952–1954
(Turkey)	Ulvi Ziya Yenal	1954
(Turkey)	Hasan Polat	1954–1957
(Turkey)	Orhan Şeref Apak	1957–1958
(Turkey)	Safa Yalçuk	1958–1959

Nat.	Name	Years
(Turkey)	Faik Gökay	1959–1960
(Turkey)	Muhterem Özyurt	1960–1961
(Turkey)	Bekir Silahçılar	1961
(Turkey)	Orhan Şeref Apak	1961–1964
(Turkey)	Muhterem Özyurt	1964–1965
(Turkey)	Orhan Şeref Apak	1965–1970
(Turkey)	Hasan Polat	1970–1976
(Turkey)	Füruzan Tekil	1976–1977
(Turkey)	Sabahattin Erman	1977
(Turkey)	İbrahim İskeçe	1977–1978
(Turkey)	Doğan Andaç	1980
(Turkey)	Yılmaz Tokatlı	1980–1984
(Turkey)	A. Kemal Ulusu	1984–1985
(Turkey)	Erdoğan Ünver	1985–1986
(Turkey)	Erdenay Oflaz	1986
(Turkey)	Ali Uras	1986–1987

Nat.	Name	Years
(Turkey)	Halim Çorbalı	1987–1989
(Turkey)	Şenes Erzik	1989–1997
(Turkey)	Özkan Olcay	1997
(Turkey)	Abdullah Kiğılı	1997
(Turkey)	Haluk Ulusoy	1997–2004
(Turkey)	Levent Bıçakcı	2004–2006
(Turkey)	Haluk Ulusoy	2006–2008
(Turkey)	Hasan Doğan	15 February 2008 – 5 July 2008
(Turkey)	Mahmut Özgener	19 August 2008–29. June 2011
(Turkey)	Mehmet Ali Aydınlar	29 June 2011 – 31 January 2012
(Turkey)	Yıldırım Demirören	27 February 2012 – 1 March 2019
(Turkey)	Hüsnü Güreli (interim)	1 March 2019 – 1 June 2019
(Turkey)	Nihat Özdemir	1 June 2019 – 4 April 2022
(Turkey)	Servet Yardımcı (interim)	4 April 2022 – 16 June 2022
(Turkey)	Mehmet Büyükekşi	16 June 2022 – 18 July 2024
(Turkey)	İbrahim Ethem Hacıosmanoğlu	18 July 2024 – present

== See also ==
- Football in Turkey
- List of Turkish football champions
- Turkish football clubs in European competitions
- Galatasaray S.K. in international football
- Turkey national football team
- Turkey national under-21 football team
- Turkey national under-19 football team
- Turkey national under-17 football team
- Turkey women's national football team
- Turkey women's national under-21 football team
- Turkey women's national under-19 football team
- Turkey women's national under-17 football team
- Turkey national futsal team
- Turkey national women's futsal team
- Turkey national beach soccer team
- Turkey national women's beach soccer team
- European Minifootball Federation
- EMF EURO
- World Minifootball Federation
- WMF World Cup
- Homeless World Cup
- European Universities Football Championships
- Football at the Summer World University Games
- FISU University Football World Cup
- Football at the Youth Olympic Games
- World Military Cup
- Football at the European Youth Summer Olympic Festival
- ISF World Football Championship
- World Deaf Football Championships
- European Deaf Football Championships
- Amputee Football World Cup
- European Amputee Football Championship
- World Blind Football Championships
- IBSA Blind Football European Championships
- IFCPF World Cup
- IFCPF European Championships
- Football 5-a-side at the Summer Paralympics
- Football 7-a-side at the Summer Paralympics
- World Police Indoor Soccer Tournament
- RoboCup Soccer League
- INAS World Football Championships
- Trisome Football
- Mundiavocat
