= Turkey Ski Federation =

Turkish Ski Federation
- Formation: 1939
- Type: Sports association
- Headquarters: Ankara, Turkey
- Members: International Ski and Snowboard Federation (FIS)
- President: Erol Mehmet Yarar
- Website: www.tkf.org.tr/

The Turkish Ski Federation (Turkish: Türkiye Kayak Federasyonu, TKF) is the main governing body for skiing in Turkey. Founded in 1939, it covers the skiing disciplines of alpine, cross-country, freestyle, Nordic combined, ski jumping, and snowboarding.

It is a member of the Turkish Olympic Committee and the International Ski and Snowboard Federation (FIS). Currently, the federation's president is Erol Mehmet Yarar.
