= Turgut Atakol =

Turkish basketball player, referee, sports official

- Born: 10 October 1915; Istanbul, Ottoman Empire
- Died: 10 April 1988 (aged 72); Istanbul, Turkey
- Occupations: Basketball player and referee
- Board member of: International Olympic Committee; Turkish Olympic Committee; Turkish Basketball Federation

Turgut Atakol (10 October 1915 – 10 April 1988) was a Turkish basketball player, referee and sports official. In 1988, he was a recipient of the Silver Olympic Order.

He played for the Galatasaray team in Istanbul. Upon retiring, he became a referee, calling many international games, including the Hungary-Czechoslovakia final of the 1955 European Championship.

He was the co-founder and president of the Turkish Basketball Federation (1958–1964), director of the organizing committee of the 1971 Mediterranean Games, secretary general of the Turkish Olympic Committee (1973–1982) and later its president (1982–1988), and member of the International Olympic Committee (1984–1988).

Turgut Atakol also wrote a book "Techniques of Basketball Refereeing", which was adopted as a guidebook by FIBA. He was enshrined in the FIBA Hall of Fame as a contributor in 2007.
