= Oya Aydoğan =

Turkish actress, model and television presenter (1957–2016)

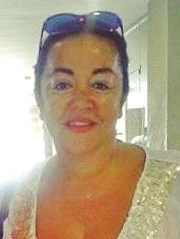
- Aydoğan in 2014
- Born: 10 February 1957; Erzincan, Turkey
- Died: 15 May 2016 (aged 59); Ulus, Beşiktaş, Istanbul, Turkey
- Occupations: Actress, model, television presenter
- Years active: 1972–2015
- Spouses: Haluk Ulusoy (m. 1979; div. 1979) Latif Demirbağ (m. 1988; div. 1989)
- Children: 1

Oya Aydoğan (10 February 1957 – 15 May 2016) was a Turkish actress, model, and television presenter. She was the winner of the Ses magazine Movie Actress Contest in 1976.

She suffered from an aortic aneurysm on 7 May 2016, before Mother's Day and died on 15 May 2016 at Liv Hospital in Ulus.

== Early life ==
Oya Aydoğan was born on 10 February 1957 to Cemal and Güldane Aydoğan in Erzincan. She was the second child in her family. Until the age of eight, she lived with her family in Beyoğlu, Istanbul.

== Acting career ==
While at school, Aydoğan decided that she wanted to become an actress, and in 1975 she won a beauty competition titled Alev Gün. However, she was forced to return the award due to the backlash from her family. In 1976, she became the winner of Ses magazine's 8th Cinema Artist Competition. In the same year, she was cast as the leading role in the movie Deli Şahin opposite Cüneyt Arkın. In 1978, she joined the cast of Neşeli Günler produced by Ertem Eğilmez. After the 1980 Turkish coup d'état, she took part in movies with Arabesque theme. In 1982, she portrayed the character Hüsniye in the movie Yedi Bela Hüsnü opposite Kemal Sunal. In 1980s, she worked as a singer in casinos. In 1986, with Emrah she produced the movie Merhamet.

In 2007–2010, she acted in FOX's fantasy-comedy TV series Bez Bebek. In 2011, she worked as a TV presenter alongside Emel Müftüoğlu on the TV program Şekerli Kahve. Before her death, she was a presenter on Beyaz TV's program Söylemezsem Olmaz alongside Lerzan Mutlu.

== Awards ==
In 2013, at the Uluslararası Çayda Çıra Film Festival in Elazığ she was given the "Honorary Award". In 2014, for her role as Meloş in the movie Kedi Özledi she won the "Best Supporting Actress" award. Sadri Alışık Awards. In 2015, Aydoğan together with Ferdi Tayfur were honored at Magazinci.com's 15 Year Internet Media Awards.

== Personal life ==
In February 1978, she met Haluk Ulusoy through Suzan Avcı. In 1979, she married Ulusoy in secret. Due to the backlash from their families, the couple divorced after four months. Aydoğan and Ulusoy later described this marriage as a mistake in their youth. Aydoğan then lived with casino owner Tamer Taylan. In 1988, she married Latif Demirbağ. They had a son. They divorced in 1989.

In 2004, she revealed that she was a follower of Alevism. In 2011, she said that she could speak French at an advanced level and could also understand English; she also named Türkan Şoray as her childhood icon. She also helped Fahriye Evcen at the beginning of her career.

== Death ==
The burial site of Oya Aydoğan

On 8 May 2016 she underwent a 12-hour surgery due to an aortic aneurysm and was put under intensive care. On 15 May 2016, she died in Istanbul at the age of 59. On 16 May 2016, she was buried at Ulus Cemetery according to her wishes.

== Filmography ==
=== Movies ===
- 1976: Deli Şahin
- 1976: Beyazperdeler
- 1977: Erkeğim
- 1977: Güneş Ne Zaman Doğacak
- 1978: Dertli Pınar
- 1978: Son Sabah
- 1978: Neşeli Günler (Zeynep)
- 1978: Yüz Numaralı Adam
- 1979: Doktor (Ayşe)
- 1979: Nazey
- 1979: Divane (Zeliha)
- 1979: Hayat Harcadın Beni
- 1979: İsyankar
- 1980: Sevgi Dünyası
- 1980: Çile Tarlası
- 1980: Zeytin Gözlüm
- 1980: Bağrıyanık
- 1980: Sabırlı Kullar
- 1981: Kara Gurbet (Cemile)
- 1981: Tövbe (Zeynep)
- 1981: Takip (Oya)
- 1982: Günaha Girme
- 1982: Berduşlar
- 1982: Yedi Bela Hüsnü (Hüsniye)
- 1983: Kalbimdeki Acı
- 1983: Günahkar
- 1984: Berduşlar Sosyetede
- 1984: Öç (İklime)
- 1984: Aşkım Günahımdır
- 1984: Sevginin Bedeli
- 1984: Yaralı
- 1984: Zavallılar
- 1984: Şaşkın
- 1985: Unutamadım
- 1986: Beyoğlu'nun Arka Sokakları
- 1986: Merhamet
- 1986: Ağla Anam Ağla
- 1987: Kan Damlaları
- 1987: Deniz
- 1988: Sokak Çocuğu
- 1989: Yaz Gülü
- 1990: Utan
- 1991: Kabadayılar Kralı
- 1992: Nehirler Denize Akar
- 1993: Bayan Perşembe
- 1996: Çapraz Ateş
- 1999: Durduramadım
- 2000: Evdeki Yabancı
- 2000: Hemşo (Bankamatikçi)
- 2001: Ectasy
- 2005: Deli Duran
- 2009: SüpüRRR!
- 2009: Türkler Çıldırmış Olmalı
- 2012: İkizler Firarda
- 2013: Kedi Özledi
- 2015: Aşk Nerede
- 2015: Kalıngiller

=== TV series ===
- 1978: Denizin Kanı
- 1993: Hamuş
- 1997: Fırat
- 1997: Sırtımdan Vuruldum
- 1998: Birisi
- 2000: Evdeki Yabancı
- 2002: Pembe Patikler
- 2007-2010: Bez Bebek
- 2007: Kısmetim Otel
- 2008: Kayıp Prenses
- 2011: Sudan Sebepler
- 2012: Düşman Kardeşler
- 2014: Şimdi Onlar Düşünsün
