= Abdullah Kiğılı =

Turkish businessman (born 1943)

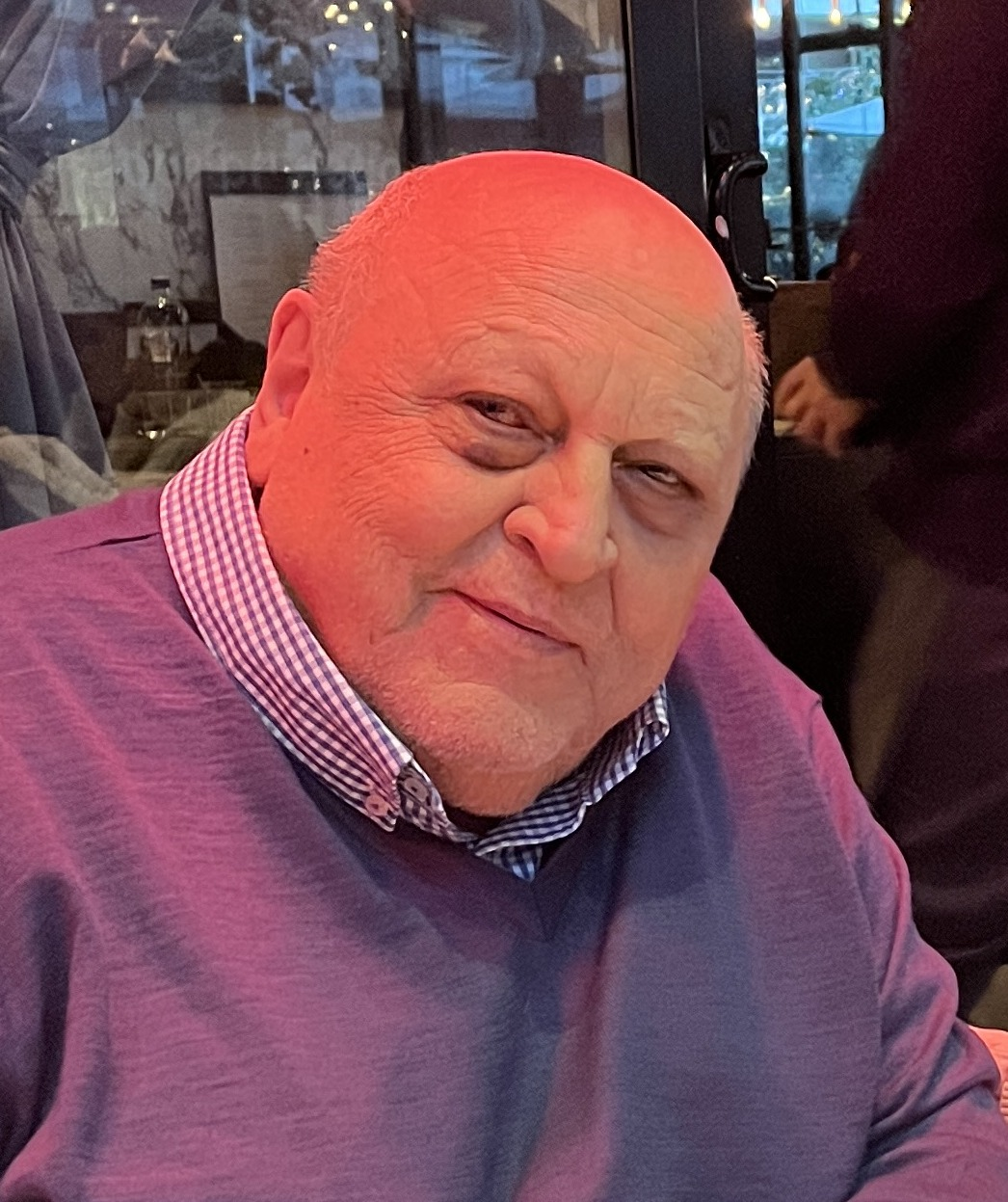
- Kiğılı Chairman of the Board
- Born: 1 January 1943 (age 83); Malatya, Turkey
- Education: Istanbul High School
- Occupation: Businessman
- Known for: Kiğılı Chairman of the Board; Fenerbahçe Vice-President

Abdullah Kiğılı (born 1943 in Malatya) is a Turkish businessman. He originates from Kiğı, Bingöl Province and his family name Kiğılı means "person from Kiğı".

Kiğılı is owner of the Kiğılı company, one of the leading clothing brands in Turkey, founded in 1965. He is a graduate of Istanbul High School.

He serves as the vice-president of Fenerbahçe SK since 22 May 2009 and also been board member between 14 June 1998 – 20 February 2000.

He was elected President of the Turkish Football Federation, serving between 9 September and 23 October 1997.

Honorary titles
Preceded by Özkan Olcay	President of the Turkish Football Federation; 9 September 1997 – 23 October 1997	Succeeded by Haluk Ulusoy
