= Kiğılı =

Turkish retail store chain, brand and manufacturer of men's clothing

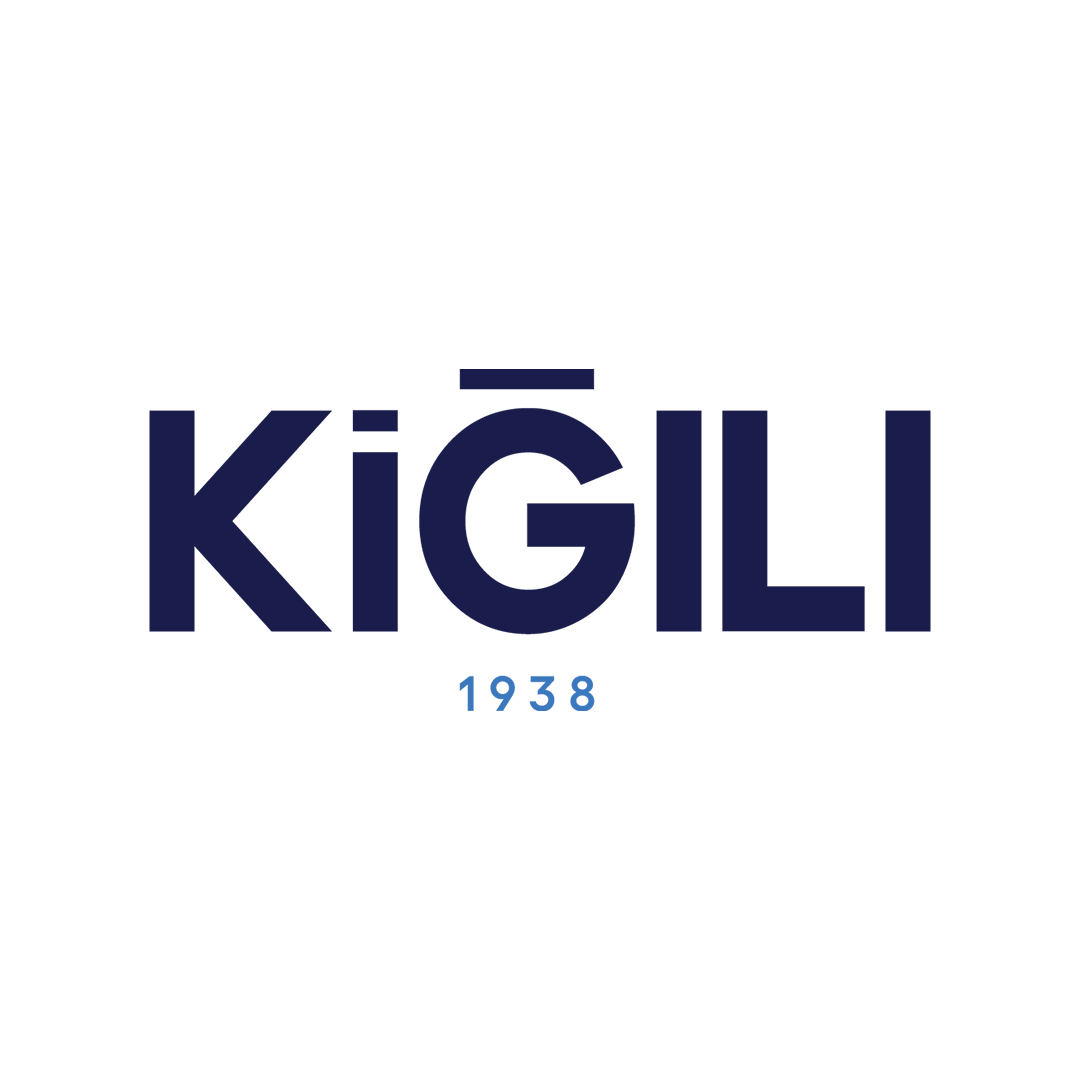
- Type: Private
- Industry: Clothing
- Founded: 1938; 88 years ago in Istanbul, Turkey
- Founder: Abdullah Kiğılı
- Headquarters: Pendik, Turkey
- Number of locations: 180 (2026)
- Areas served: Europe; Middle East; Caucasus; Central Asia; Russia
- Key people: Sena Suerdem (CEO)
- Products: Men's clothing
- Number of employees: 2200 (2024)
- Website: kigili.com

Kiğılı (Turkish pronunciation: ['ki.ɯ.lɯ], 'kee-ə-lə) is a Turkish clothing producer and an eponymous chain of men's clothing stores across Turkey and other countries.

== Origins ==
Kiğılı was founded in 1938 as a company selling fabrics for men's clothing. In 1965, Abdullah Kiğılı started selling ready-made trousers and shirts and in 1969, opened his first store on the (then) main upscale shopping street of Istanbul, Istiklal Avenue.

== Recent history ==
In 2021 Kiğılı launched its "Oktay Kaynarca designed by Kiğılı" line in cooperation with Turkish actor Oktay Kaynarca.

In 2023 it launched its virtual store in the Metaverse.

== Awards ==
In 2019 and 2020 Kiğılı received the award "Most admired brand of chain stores in shopping centers".

Kiğılı won the "International Clothing Brand of the Year" award at the Turkey Gold Brand Awards, while chairman of the Board Abdullah Kiğılı received the "Lifetime Achievement Award" at the ceremony.

== Subsidiaries ==
Kiğılı has subsidiaries in three Balkan countries:

- Serbia, Kiğılı Retail RS DOO-Belgrad
- Romania, Kiğılı Retail RO S.R.L.
- Macedonia, Kiğılı DOOel Skopje
