= Mahmut Özgener =

Turkish president of the Turkish Football Federation

- Born: 1963 (age 62–63); İzmir
- Known for: Been the 38th president of the Turkish Football Federation

Mahmut Özgener (born 1963 İzmir) has been the 38th president of the Turkish Football Federation. He succeeded Hasan Doğan, who died of a heart attack in Bodrum. He served from 19 August 2008 until 29 June 2011.

== Biography ==
Özgener was born in İzmir, where he completed his primary, secondary and high school education.

== Personal ==
He is married and has two children. Özgener speaks also English and French. He was the chairman of Altay club before his duty in TFF.

== Ankaragücü and Ankaraspor Case ==
Cengiz Topel Yıldırım was replaced by Ahmet Gökçek as club chairman of Ankaragücü. Since Ahmet Gökçek was previously on Ankaraspor board as a volunteer, TFF rejected this replacement. Melih Gökçek, who is honorary chairman of Ankaraspor and Ahmet Gökçek's father, accused him of being subjective.

Honorary titles
Preceded by Hasan Doğan	President of the Turkish Football Federation; 19 August 2008–29 June 2011	Succeeded by Mehmet Ali Aydınlar
