= Hasan Doğan =

Turkish football administrator (1956–2008)

- Born: 15 March 1956; Abana, Turkey
- Died: 5 July 2008 (aged 52); Bodrum, Turkey
- Known for: 37th President of the Turkish Football Federation

Hasan Doğan (15 March 1956 – 5 July 2008) was the 37th president of the Turkish Football Federation. He died of a heart attack in Bodrum, a popular tourist destination in the southwest Turkish Riviera, where he was on vacation. He was incumbent for a relatively short period, beginning on 14 February 2008 and serving until his death on 5 July 2008.

During his presidency, the Turkey national team qualified for the semi-finals at UEFA Euro 2008, held in Austria and Switzerland.

The 2015–16 season of the Turkish Süper Lig was named in his honour.

== Personal ==
He was married to Aysel Doğan, who accompanied him to Euro 2008. He had two children, Zeynep and Selim.

Honorary titles
Preceded by Haluk Ulusoy	President of the Turkish Football Federation; 14 February 2008 – 5 July 2008	Succeeded by Mahmut Özgener
