= Rezan Topaloğlu =

Turkish pediatrician and academic

- Born: Turkey
- Occupations: Pediatrician, pediatric nephrologist and academic

Academic background
- Education: Doctor of Medicine
- Alma mater: Hacettepe University

Academic work
- Institutions: Hacettepe University Faculty of Medicine; Acıbadem Healthcare Group

Rezan Topaloğlu is a Turkish pediatrician and an academic. She is a Professor of Pediatrics at Hacettepe University and Acıbadem Healthcare Group.

She is the chair of IPNA (International Pediatric Nephrology Association) Junior Master Classes and recipient of the 2022 IPNA Educational Activity Award for her work leading Pediatric Nephrology formal Education Classes.

== Education and career ==
Topaloğlu earned her Doctor of Medicine degree from Hacettepe University Faculty of Medicine in Ankara, Turkey, and undertook an elective study at Leeds General Infirmary, University of Leeds, United Kingdom. She began her academic career at Hacettepe University Children's Hospital as an instructor in pediatrics from 1988 to 1991. From 1991 to 1999, she served as an associate professor of pediatrics, specializing in pediatric nephrology and rheumatology. During her fellowship in pediatric nephrology and rheumatology, she worked at Guy’s and Hammersmith Hospital in London, focusing on C1q deficiency and nephrotic syndrome. She also worked as a research fellow at the National Institute of Diabetes and Digestive and Kidney Diseases (NIDDK) at the National Institutes of Health (NIH) in the United States, where she studied Bartter syndrome. She was promoted to professor of pediatrics in 1999 and held this position at Hacettepe University until 2023. Since 2023, she has been affiliated with Acıbadem Healthcare Group as a consultant and professor of pediatrics, with continued specialization in pediatric nephrology and rheumatology.

Topaloğlu also holds administrative and professional experience. She held appointments as a council member of both the European Society for Pediatric Nephrology and the International Pediatric Nephrology Association from 2013 to 2019, and subsequently, she was appointed to Executive Board Member of the International Pediatric Nephrology Association from 2019 to 2022, as well as President of the European Society for Pediatric Nephrology during the same period.
