= Haluk Ulusoy =

29th President of Turkish Football Federation
- In office 4 November 1997 – 22 July 2004
- Preceded by: Abdullah Kığılı
- Succeeded by: Levent Bıçakçı
- In office 19 January 2006 – 30 June 2008
- Preceded by: Levent Bıçakçı
- Succeeded by: Hasan Doğan

Personal details
- Born: 6 May 1958 (age 67) Trabzon, Turkey
- Spouse: Oya Aydoğan (m. 1979; div. 1979)

Haluk Ulusoy (born 6 May 1958 in Trabzon) is the former president of Turkish Football Federation. His initially held the post between 1997 and 2004, but was re-elected for a second spell in 2006.

== Awards ==
- 2002 Turkish State Medal of Distinguished Service

Honorary titles
Preceded by Abdullah Kiğılı; Levent Bıçakçı	President of the Turkish Football Federation; 1997-04; 2006-08	Succeeded by Levent Bıçakçı; Hasan Doğan
