= Vildan Aşir Savaşır =

Turkish athlete and sports executive

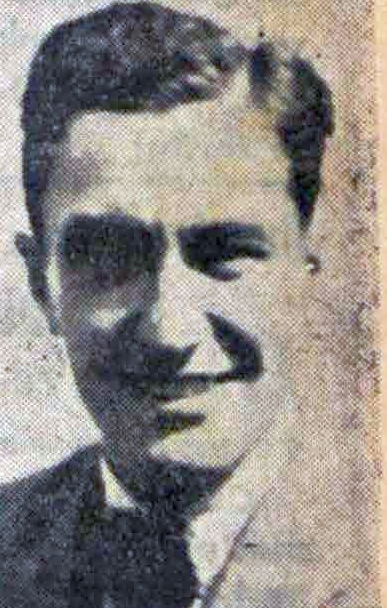
- Aşir Savaşır in 1933

Personal information
- Nationality: Turkish
- Born: 1903 Istanbul, Turkey
- Died: 12 December 1986 (aged 82–83) Istanbul, Turkey

Sport
- Sport: Athletics

Vildan Aşir Savaşır (1903 – 12 December 1986) was a Turkish athlete and sports executive.

He was born in Istanbul in 1903, graduated from Galatasaray High School. He planned to compete at the long jump event at the 1924 Summer Olympics but didn't start. Savaşır, who studied sports and athletics in Sweden, served as the president of the Turkish Athletic Federation between 1935-1939, the Deputy General Manager of Physical Education in 1938 and the General Manager of Physical Education between 1946-1950. He was the president of the Turkish Olympic Committee between 1943 and 1950.

Aşir Savaşır died in Istanbul on 12 December 1986.
