= Mehmet Ali Aydınlar =

Turkish Football Federation President

- Born: July 24, 1956 (age 70); Arapgir, Malatya Province, Turkey
- Education: Galatasaray Economy and Commerce Academy
- Occupation: CEO of Acıbadem Healthcare Group
- Known for: Being the 38th president of the Turkish Football Federation

Mehmet Ali Aydınlar (born 24 July 1956 in Arapgir, Malatya Province) was the 39th President of the Turkish Football Federation. He is a minority shareholder and CEO of Turkey's leading hospital chain Acıbadem Healthcare Group.

Aydınlar began his career as a financial advisor in 1981, and began working for Acıbadem Hospital in 1993. In 2000, the business expanded to become the Acıbadem Healthcare Group, becoming the only Turkish medical provider to be listed on the Turkish stock market. He was a board member of the 38th Turkey Football Federation between 14 February 2008 and 29 June 2011 and Director of Fenerbahçe Acıbadem, which is a multi-sports club Fenerbahçe S.K.'s Women's Volleyball Branch between 2007 and 2011.

== Accolades ==
Aydınlar received an honorary doctorate from the Kütahya Dumlupınar University.

Honorary titles
Preceded by Mahmut Özgener	President of the Turkish Football Federation; June 29, 2011–January 31, 2012	Succeeded by Yıldırım Demirören
