= Najla =

Najla is a given name. It may refer to:

- Najla Aljeraiwi, Kuwaiti cyclist
- Najla AlKanderi, Kuwaiti television and radio presenter
- Sheikha Najla Al Qasimi, Emirati diplomat
- Najla Al-Sonboli, Yemeni paediatrician
- Najla Ayoubi, Afghan women's rights defender, lawyer and former judge
- Najla Ben Abdallah, Tunisian actress and model
- Najla Bouden, Prime Minister of Tunisia
  - Bouden Cabinet
- Najla Faisal Al Awadhi, Emirati former MP
- Najla Jabor (1915-2001), Brazilian conductor and composer
- Najla Kassab, Lebanese church minister
- Najla Mangoush, Libyan lawyer and diplomat
- Najla Said (born 1974), American-Palestinian author and actress

== See also ==
- TS Najla, former North Sea ferry
- Nejla
- Necla
