= Akif Çukurçayır =

Professor at Selçuk University

Akif Çukurçayır is a Public Administration professor at Selçuk University in Konya, Turkey. His studies mainly focus on governance, citizen centered local politics, local administrations and political participation.

== Education ==
- Bachelor's degree: Public Administration, Ankara University, Faculty of Political Sciences, 1990
- Postgraduate: Public Administration, Selçuk University, Institute of Social Sciences, 1994
- Postgraduate: Public Administration, Deutsche Hochschule Für Verwaltungswissenschaften Speyer (Germany), 1998
- Phd: Public Administration(Urbanization and Environmental Problems), Ankara University, Institute of Social Sciences, 1999

He also studies urban and environmental issues. 1

== Career ==
- Senate membership of Seljuk University: 2011-2016
- Dean of Tourism Faculty: 2012-2016
- Membership of the social sciences commission of Seljuk University: 2011-2015
- Participant in the 8th and 10th Development Plans:2000-2013

=== Guest Professor ===
- Zeppelin University, Friedrichshafen, Germany, 2011 (two months) Beitrag im Rahmen des Sommerfestes der Zeppelin Universität “Bürger.Macht.Staat?“ zum Thema „Demokratisierung der Kommunen in der Türkei“. Von persönlichem Interesse war für
- M. Akif Çukurçayir auch die Mitwirkung an der Auswahl-kommission im Rahmen der Bewerberauswahl von künftigen Studierenden der Zeppelin Universität und die Teilnahme an der 200-Jahr-Feier der Stadt Friedrichshafen, Deutschland, 2011. Praxis: Kommunale Gemeinschaftsstelle (KGSt), 1997-1998
- Metropolitan Municipality of Heidelberg, 1997
- Guest Professor for Erasmus Programme: Danibuis University, Galati, Romania, 2015

== Selected works ==
- M. Akif Çukurçayır vd., (Ed.), Yerel Yönetimlerde Yolsuzlukla Mücadele ve Denetim Sorunları, Mülkiye Teftiş Kurulu Başkanlığı, Ankara, 2012 (Corruption and Audit Problems in Local Governments)
- M. Akif Çukurçayır, Ayşe Tekel (Ed.), Yerel ve Kentsel Politikalar, 2. Baskı, Çizgi Kitabevi, Konya, 2012 (Local and Urban Politics)
- M. Akif Çukurçayır, H. Tuğba Eroğlu (Ed.), Kuramdan Uygulamaya Yönetişim, Çizgi Kitabevi, Konya, 2013 (Governance: Theory and Praxis)
- M. Akif Çukurçayır, Yurttaşsız Demokrasi, Çizgi Kitabevi, 2. Baskı, Konya, 2011 (Democracy without citizen)
- M. Akif Çukurçayır, Yurttaş Odaklı Yerel Yönetim, 3. Baskı, Çizgi Kitabevi, Konya, (Citizen Oriented Local Governments)
- M. Akif Çukurçayır, Yerel Yönetimler-Kuram, Kurum ve Yeni Yaklaşımlar, Çizgi Kitabevi, Konya, 2015. (Local Governments: Theory, Institution, New Approaches)
- M. Akif Çukurçayır, Gülise Gökçe (Ed.), Türk Kamu Yönetiminin Yapısal ve İşlevsel Sorunları, Çizgi Kitabevi, Konya, 2007. (Structural and Functional Problems of Turkish Public Administration)
- M. Akif Çukurçayır, Siyasal Katılma ve Yerel Demokrasi, Çizgi Kitabevi Yayınları, 4. Baskı, Konya, Şubat 2012. (Political Participation and Local Democracy)
- M. Akif Çukurçayır (Ed.), Küresel Sistemde Siyaset, Yönetim ve Ekonomi, Çizgi Yayınları, Konya, 2003. (Politics, Management and Economy in Global System)
- M. Akif Çukurçayır, H.Tuğba Eroğlu, Hayriye Sağır, Mücahit Navruz, Kamu Yönetiminde Değişimin Rolü ve Etkileri, Bildiriler Kitabı, Konya, 2016, (Public Administration Congress Proceedings Book)
- M. Akif Çukurçayır, Şafak Ünüvar, Alaaddin Başoda, Mehmet Sağır vd, I.Avrasya Turizm Kongresi Bildiriler Kitabı, 2015, Konya. (I. Eurasia International Tourism Congress: Current Issues, Trends, And Indicators 28 May 2015, Konya.)
