= Taşdemir =

Taşdemir is a Turkish surname and may refer to:

- Anıl Taşdemir (born 1988), Turkish footballer
- Dirayet Taşdemir, Turkish politician
- Emre Taşdemir (born 1995), Turkish professional footballer
- Tayfun Taşdemir (born 1975), Turkish professional carom billiards player
