= Ağrı (electoral district) =

Electoral district for the Grand National Assembly of Turkey

Coordinates: 37°50′N 34°45′E

- electoral district for the Grand National Assembly of Turkey
- Ağrı shown within Turkey
- Province: Ağrı
- Electorate: 278,699

Current electoral district
- Created: 1923
- Seats: 4 Historical: 5 (2002–2007) 4 (1999)
- Turnout at last election: 74.76%
- Representation
- HDP: 3 / 4
- AK Party: 1 / 4

Ağrı is an electoral district of the Grand National Assembly of Turkey. It elects four members of parliament (deputies) to represent the province of the same name for a four-year term by the D'Hondt method, a party-list proportional representation system.

== Members ==
Population reviews of each electoral district are conducted before each general election, which can lead to certain districts being granted a smaller or greater number of parliamentary seats. Ağrı elected four members in 1999. This rose to five in 2002 and 2007 before being reduced back down to four MPs in the 2011 general election.

MPs for Ağrı, 2002 onwards
Election	2002 (22nd parliament)	2007 (23rd parliament)	2011 (24th parliament)	June 2015 (25th parliament)	November 2015 (26th parliament)	2018 (27th parliament)	2023 (28th parliament)
MP	Mehmet Kerim Yıldız; AK Party	Mehmet Hanifi Alır; AK Party	Ekrem Çelebi; AK Party	Leyla Zana; HDP		Dirayet Taşdemir; HDP	Sırrı Sakık; YSGP
MP	Mehmet Melik Özmen; AK Party	Abdulkerim Aydemir; AK Party	Fatma Salman; AK Party	Berdan Öztürk; HDP			Nejla Demir; YSGP
MP	Halil Özyolcu; AK Party	Yaşar Eryılmaz; AK Party	Mehmet Kerim Yıldız; AK Party	Dirayet Taşdemir; HDP		Abdullah Koç; HDP	Heval Bozdağ; YSGP
MP	Cemal Kaya; CHP	Cemal Kaya; AK Party	Halil Aksoy; Independent	Mehmet Emin İlhan; HDP	Cesim Gökçe; AK Party	Ekrem Çelebi; AK Party	Ruken Kilerci; AK Party
MP	Naci Aslan; CHP	Fatma Kotan; AK Party	No seat				

== General elections ==
=== 2011 ===
2011 general election: Ağrı
Party	Candidate	Votes	%	±%
AK Party	3 elected ▼2: 1. Mehmet Kerim Yıldız ✓; 2. Ekrem Çelebi ✓; 3. Fatma salman Kotan ✓; 4. Mehmet Şerif Kösen ✗	96,616	47.62	▼15.40
Independent	1 elected ▲1: Halil Aksoy ✓ Nidahi Seven ✗ Necef Aslan Coşkun ✗	88,093	43.42	▲19.06
MHP	None elected: 1. Şahin Ege ✗; 2. Nazlı Yılmaz ✗; 3. Çoşkun Aytekin ✗; 4. Bayram Erişmiş ✗	4,505	2.22	▼2.36
CHP	None elected: 1. Seyfeddin Çelik ✗; 2. Selahattin Daşkaya ✗; 3. Şefika Öner ✗; 4. Kürşat Koç ✗	4,503	2.22	▼0.35
Büyük Birlik	None elected: 1. Ali Fuat Çelik ✗; 2. Erhan Bayram ✗; 3. Ayhan Zariç ✗; 4. Hüseyin Akdemir ✗	3,536	1.74	▲1.74
HAS Party	None elected: 1. Aydın Kasar ✗; 2. Sernaz Polat ✗; 3. Nazım Bayram ✗; 4. Mehmet Cemil Güven ✗	1,141	0.56	▲0.56
DSP	None elected: 1. Necmettin Aslan ✗; 2. Ömer Faruk Şahvelet ✗; 3. Adem Karakol ✗; 4. Cuma Ali İbrik ✗	1,062	0.52	N/A
SAADET	None elected: 1. Abdulaziz Yıldız ✗; 2. Turan Öğürtay ✗; 3. Taner Keskin ✗; 4. Mithat Yıldız ✗	1,053	0.52	▼0.42
DP	None elected: 1. Adil Göksel ✗; 2. Mahmut Mermertaş ✗; 3. Mustafa Çelik ✗; 4. Yusuf Öztürk ✗	891	0.44	▼2.58
Communist_Party_of_Turkey_(today)	None elected: 1. Müjde Tozbey Erden ✗; 2. Hetem Ayaz ✗; 3. Gülhanım daşdemir ✗; 4. Yılmaz Karadağ ✗	689	0.34	▼0.15
Nationalist Conservative	None elected: 1. Hakan Çiftçi ✗; 2. Aykan Atmaca ✗; 3. Halil İbrahim Önder ✗; 4. Memiş Tunay Aslıyürek ✗	283	0.14	▲0.14
DYP	None elected: 1. Adem Çınar ✗; 2. Abdulbasit Akgeyik ✗; 3. Suat Uzunay ✗; 4. Sıracettin Bilirer ✗	273	0.13	▲0.13
MP	None elected: 1. Mirza Ballı ✗; 2. Ali Osman Yıldırım ✗; 3. Ebrubekir Ballı ✗; 4. Gönül Gün ✗	245	0.12	▲0.12
Liberal Democrat	No candidates	0	0.00	▼0.08
HEPAR	No candidates	0	0.00	0.00
Labour	No candidates	0	0.00	0.00
Total votes		202,890	100.00	
Rejected ballots		5,477	2.63	▲1.38
Turnout		208,367	74.76	▼1.05

=== June 2015 ===
Abbr.	Party	Votes	%
HDP	Peoples' Democratic Party	185,506	78.2%
AKP	Justice and Development Party	37,622	15.9%
MHP	Nationalist Movement Party	6,086	2.6%
CHP	Republican People's Party	2,340	1%
	Other	5,618	2.4%
Total		237,172	
Turnout		82.71	
source: YSK

=== November 2015 ===
Abbr.	Party	Votes	%
HDP	Peoples' Democratic Party	145,689	68.1%
AKP	Justice and Development Party	57,780	27%
MHP	Nationalist Movement Party	3,275	1.5%
CHP	Republican People's Party	2,789	1.3%
	Other	4,279	2%
Total		213,812	
Turnout		75.30	
source: YSK

=== 2018 ===
Abbr.	Party	Votes	%
HDP	Peoples' Democratic Party	142,683	63.6%
AKP	Justice and Development Party	62,284	27.8%
CHP	Republican People's Party	5,421	2.4%
MHP	Nationalist Movement Party	5,171	2.3%
IYI	Good Party	3,501	1.6%
SP	Felicity Party	1,813	0.8%
HÜDA-PAR	Free Cause Party	1,731	0.8%
	Other	1,663	0.7%
Total		224,267	
Turnout		78.63	
source: YSK

=== 2023 ===
Elected to the 28th Parliament of Turkey:

Member	Political party
Sırrı Sakık	Party of Greens and the Left Future
Nejla Demir	Party of Greens and the Left Future
Heval Bozdağ	Party of Greens and the Left Future
Ruken Kilerci	Justice and Development Party

== Presidential elections ==
=== 2014 ===
2014 presidential election: Ağrı
Party	Candidate	Votes	%
HDP	Selahattin Demirtaş	121,674	61.28
AK Party	Recep Tayyip Erdoğan	72,356	36.44
Independent	Ekmeleddin İhsanoğlu	4,512	2.27
Total votes		198,542	100.00
Rejected ballots		2,337	1.16
Turnout		200,879	70.18
Selahattin Demirtaş win			
