= Halil Mutlu (politics) =

Turkish physician and statesperson (born 1971)

Chairman of AK Party USA
- Incumbent
- Assumed office February 25, 2022
- President: Recep Tayyip Erdoğan
- Preceded by: Position established

Personal details
- Born: Halil Mutlu; 1971 (age 54-55) Güneysu, Rize, Turkey
- Party: Justice and Development Party
- Relatives: Recep Tayyip Erdoğan (cousin)
- Education: Selçuk University Faculty of Medicine (MD)
- Occupation: Physician

Halil Mutlu (born 1971) is a Turkish-born physician, political lobbyist and community activist living in the United States of America. Mutlu is currently serving as Chairman of AK Party Representative to the United States, who is the first representative for the party in the United States. Previously, he was co-chair of Turkish American Steering Committee (TASC) and is a former chair of the Türken Foundation.

== Early life and education ==
Mutlu was born in Guneysu, Rize, in 1971. His father, Kemal, is the brother of Tenzile Erdoğan (née Mutlu; 1924–2011), the mother of Recep Tayyip Erdoğan, making Mutlu a cousin of President Recep Tayyip Erdoğan.. Mutlu completed elementary and middle school in Kasimpasa and high school at Kabatas Erkek Lisesi. He attended Selcuk University Medical School in Konya. After graduation, he completed his mandatory service and entered emergency medicine. During an academic visit to the United States, he passed the United States Medical Licensing Examinations and became eligible to practice medicine in the United States. He completed an internal medicine residency at Berkshire Medical Center, affiliated with the University of Massachusetts Medical School. Since 2010, Mutlu has been working at the Baystate Medical Center in Springfield, Massachusetts.

== Community involvement ==
By the mid-2010s, Mutlu had become involved in Turkish-American community institutions and advocacy networks, serving in leadership roles in the Turkish American National Steering Committee (TASC), including as co-chair during some periods. A public TASC announcement cited by external reporting states that TASC accepted his resignation as co-chair in March 2022. Mutlu has also been linked to the leadership of the Türken Foundation, providing student housing and faith-friendly housing for Muslim and Turkish students.

In July 2016, immediately after the coup attempt in Turkey, Mutlu drove to Saylorsburg with a carload of friends and joined a protest outside the residence of political figure Fethullah Gülen, who was accused by the Turkish government of being behind the coup attempt.

== Political activities ==
In February 2022, Turkish media reported that Mutlu was appointed as the first representative of the Justice and Development Party (AK Party) in the United States. The AK Party’s official website lists its Washington representative office under the party’s Foreign Affairs chairmanship, which is headed by Zafer Sırakaya.

Recep Tayyip Erdoğan (center) walks alongside Halil Mutlu (right) and Hakan Fidan (left) in New York City during UN General Assembly

The representative office has been described as part of the party’s overseas organization. AK Party has stated that it operates election coordination centers abroad and mobilizes volunteers to campaign among eligible overseas voters during Turkish elections and referendums, especially leading up to the 2023 Turkish presidential election.

In filings under the U.S. Foreign Agents Registration Act (FARA), AK Party Representation to the United States described its role as representing the AK Party in the United States and outlined political activities, including outreach and engagement in support of the party’s objectives. Later supplemental statements also reported contacts and discussions related to U.S.–Türkiye relations, including outreach to congressional offices by AK Party USA’s Government and International Affairs function, and the engagement of another lobbyist.

== Personal life ==
Mutlu's father, Kemal Mutlu, is the brother of Tenzile Erdoğan (née Mutlu; 1924–2011), the mother of Recep Tayyip Erdoğan, making Mutlu a cousin of President Recep Tayyip Erdoğan..

Mutlu’s father, Kemal Mutlu, died on January 24, 2013. His funeral prayer was held at the Büyük Piyalepaşa Mosque in Kasımpaşa, with then–Prime Minister Recep Tayyip Erdoğan in attendance. The prayer was led by Raşit Küçük, Chair of the High Council of Religious Affairs within the Presidency of Religious Affairs. Following the service, Kemal Mutlu was buried in the family plot at Kulaksız Cemetery. Attendees at the cemetery ceremony included Prime Minister Erdoğan, Former Minister of Environment and Urbanization Erdoğan Bayraktar, Former Minister of Customs and Trade Hayati Yazıcı, Former Minister of Energy and Natural Resources Taner Yıldız, and Former Prime Minister Binali Yıldırım.

Mutlu is married with one child.
