= Kayabey, Ağrı =

Kayabey
- Village
- Location in Turkey
- Coordinates: 39°48′49″N 42°55′41″E
- Country: Turkey
- Province: Ağrı
- District: Ağrı
- Elevation: 1,788 m (5,866 ft)
- Population (2023): 299
- Time zone: UTC+3 (TRT)
- Postal code: 04010
- Area code: 0472

Kayabey is a village in the Ağrı District of Ağrı Province, Turkey.

== History ==
Kayabey has been known by its current name since 1902 and was formerly part of Eleşkirt district before being transferred to Ağrı Merkez on September 17, 1985. The name of the village was listed as Kayabey in historical records from 1902.

== Geography ==
The village is located 14 km from the city center of Ağrı.

== Population ==
Historical population
Year	Pop.	±% p.a.
1965	384	—
1985	390	+0.08%
1990	428	+1.88%
1997	425	−0.10%
2007	396	−0.70%
2012	413	+0.84%
2017	378	−1.76%
2023	299	−3.83%
Source: Population censuses (1965-1997) and TÜİK (2007-2023)
