= Nejla Demir =

Turkish engineer and politician (born 1988)

Nejla Demir (born 1988, Agri, Turkey) is an agricultural engineer and politician. Since June 2023 she is a member of the Grand National Assembly of Turkey representing the Peoples' Equality and Democracy Party (DEM Party) for Agri.

== Early life, education and professional career ==
Nejla Demir was born in Agri and received primary and secondary education in town. Later she studied agricultural sciences at the Yüzüncü Yıl University in Van from where she graduated with a BSc in agricultural engineering and a MSc in animal sciences from the Institute of Science and Technology. Nejla Demir worked at the Chamber of Agriculture since 2011. According to their own account, she was working in Agri supporting agriculture for twelve years.

== Political career ==
In the parliamentary elections of May 2023, she was elected into the Grand National Assembly of Turkey representing Agri for the YSP. She aims for enabling to establish agricultural projects based on women initiatives and to provide the young people an opportunity in Agri so they do not ned to emigrate abroad.

== Personal life ==
Nejla Demir is married and the mother of two children. Both of her parents were sentenced to prison for terrorist propaganda and they emigrated into exile abroad. She was also imprisoned for a short while due to a tweet concerning the Turkish invasion of Syrian Kurdistan in Syria in 2019.
