= Fatma Salman Kotan =

Turkish politician

Fatma Salman Kotan (née Salman, born 1970) is a Turkish accountant, politician and Member of Parliament for Ağrı, representing the Justice and Development Party.

== Early life and education ==
Fatma Salman Kotan is the daughter of Sheikh Ahmet Salman. She is a graduate in economics from Atatürk University in Erzurum.

She has said that her mother, Antika Salman, died as a result of having a third daughter, having felt pressurised to try to have a son. Kotan was six at the time of her mother's death.

Kotan was the first woman in her family to be able to study.

== Career ==
Kotan was a financial advisor and worked in the Parliamentary Clerk's Office before her election as member of parliament.

Because of her mother's death, Kotan has been active in trying to prevent violence or emotional abuse against women who do not have sons.

She has set up a brick factory in order to show that women can be involved in industry.

== Personal life ==
Kotan married İdris Kotan in 1995; they have three children. They were divorced in 2012 because of his violence towards her. She appeared in parliament the following day with a bruised face; other women MPs offered her support. She became a role model for women who have violent husbands.

== See also ==
- Domestic violence in Turkey
