= Cesim Gökçe =

Turkish politician

Cesim Gökçe MP

Member of the Grand National Assembly
- Incumbent
- Assumed office 1 November 2015
- Constituency: Ağrı (Nov 2015)

Personal details
- Born: May 5, 1968 (age 58) Ağrı, Turkey
- Party: Justice and Development Party (2015-2019); Future Party (2019−present)
- Education: Atatürk University
- Occupation: Politician

Cesim Gökçe (born 5 May 1968) is a Turkish politician from the Justice and Development Party (AK Party), who has served as a Member of Parliament for Ağrı since 1 November 2015.

Born in Ağrı, Gökçe completed his primary, secondary, and high school education in Ağrı. He graduated from Atatürk University as an agricultural engineer in 1991. In 2011, he was promoted to Ağrı Province local authority general secretary. He resigned from his post to enter politics. He joined the ruling AK Party, and was elected into the Grand National Assembly of Turkey (TBMM) in the November 2015 general election as an MP from Ağrı Province. In 2019, he left the AKP and joined the newly founded Future Party.

Gökçe is married, and has three children. He speaks Kurdish and Arabic.

== See also ==
- 26th Parliament of Turkey
