= Ağrı District =

District of Ağrı Province, Turkey

- District
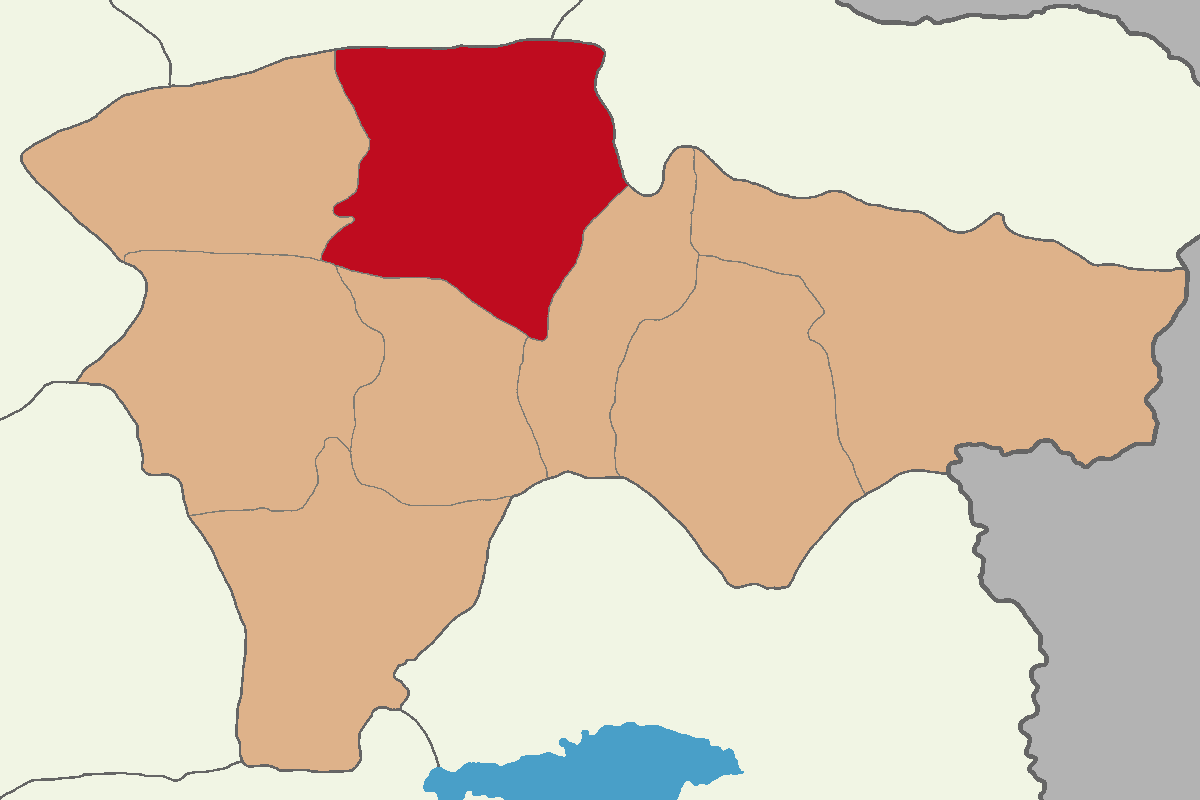
- Map showing Ağrı District in Ağrı Province

- Location in Turkey
- Coordinates: 39°43′N 43°03′E
- Country: Turkey
- Province: Ağrı
- Seat: Ağrı
- Area: 1,695 km^{2} (654 sq mi)
- Population (2021): 150,335
  - Density: 88.69/km^{2} (229.7/sq mi)
- Time zone: UTC+3 (TRT)

Ağrı District (also: Merkez, meaning "central") is a district of Ağrı Province of Turkey. Its seat is the city Ağrı. Its area is 1,695 km^{2}, and its population is 150,335 (2021).

== Composition ==
There is one municipality in Ağrı District:

- Ağrı

There are 107 villages in Ağrı District:

- Ağılbaşı
- Ahmetbey
- Akbulgur
- Akçay
- Altınçayır
- Anakaya
- Arakonak
- Aslangazi
- Aşağı Pamuktaş
- Aşağıağadeve
- Aşağıdürmeli
- Aşağıkent
- Aşağısaklıca
- Aşağıyoldüzü
- Aşkale
- Badıllı
- Balıksu
- Balkaynak
- Ballıbostan
- Baloluk
- Başçavuş
- Başkent
- Beşbulak
- Beşiktepe
- Bezirhane
- Boztoprak
- Bölükbaşı
- Cumaçay
- Çakıroba
- Çamurlu
- Çatalipaşa
- Çayırköy
- Çobanbeyi
- Çukuralan
- Çukurçayır
- Dedemaksut
- Doğutepe
- Dönerdere
- Dumanlı
- Eğribelen
- Eliaçık
- Esenköy
- Eskiharman
- Geçitalan
- Gümüşyazı
- Güneysu
- Güvendik
- Güvenli
- Hacısefer
- Hanoba
- Hıdır
- Kalender
- Karasu
- Kavacık
- Kavakköy
- Kayabey
- Kazlı
- Kocataş
- Koçbaşı
- Konuktepe
- Kovancık
- Kumlugeçit
- Mollaali
- Mollaosman
- Murat
- Murathan
- Oğlaklı
- Ortakent
- Ortayokuş
- Otlubayır
- Ozanlar
- Özbaşı
- Özveren
- Sabuncu
- Sağırtaş
- Sarıca
- Sarıdoğan
- Sarıharman
- Sarıtaş
- Soğan Eleşkirt
- Soğancumaçay
- Söğütlü
- Suçatağı
- Taştekne
- Taypınar
- Tellisırt
- Tezeren
- Uçarkaya
- Uzunveli
- Yakınca
- Yalnızkonak
- Yaylaköy
- Yazıcı
- Yazılı
- Yığıntepe
- Yolluyazı
- Yolugüzel
- Yoncalı
- Yorgunsöğüt
- Yukarıağadeve
- Yukarıdürmeli
- Yukarıküpkıran
- Yukarıpamuktaş
- Yukarısaklıca
- Yukarıyoldüzü
- Yurtpınar
- Ziyaret
