= Abdullah Koç =

Turkish politician of Kurdish descent

Member of the Grand National Assembly of Turkey
- Incumbent
- Assumed office 2018
- Constituency: Agri

Personal details
- Born: 1 June 1972 (age 53) Diyadin, Turkey
- Party: HDP
- Education: Selçuk University
- Profession: Lawyer

Abdullah Koç (1 June 1972, Diyadin, Turkey) is a jurist and politician of Kurdish descent. He is a member of the Grand National Assembly of Turkey representing the Peoples Democratic Party (HDP).

== Early life and education ==
He was born in Diyadin in the Ağri province and attended primary school in Doğubeyazıt and high school in Diyadin. He studied law at the Anadolu and Selçuk University and graduated in 1998. He later also studied Tourism at the Anadolu University from which he graduated in 2015.

== Professional career ==
In the early 1990s, Koç was involved in the foundation of the Free University and had a seat in the editorial board of the Free Universities journal Özgür Bilim. In this journal he published articles focused on Oil in Middle East and Law of War. He was working as a lawyer since 1999 and also gave vocational training for the Ministry of National Education. His articles on labor law have been published in a variety of journals.

== Political career ==
In the parliamentary elections on 2018, Koç was elected into the Grand National Assembly of Turkey, representing Ağri for the HDP. In parliament he took a seat in the justice commission. As an MP he demanded answers regarding the alleged suicides of Turkish soldiers. In 2019, he tried to read out a press statement on the detention of his fellow HDP members but was prevented from it by the Turkish authorities. On the 17 March 2021, the Turkish state prosecutor before the Court of Cassation Bekir Şahin, filed a lawsuit before the Constitutional Court demanding for Koç and 686 other HDP politicians a five-year ban to engage in politics. The lawsuit was filed together with the request for a closure of the HDP. In January 2022, he was included in a request to lift the parliamentary immunity of over 20 HDP politicians.

== Personal life ==
Koç is a mountaineer and has climbed several peaks. He has published articles on extreme sports and also crimes against nature. He is married and has two children.
