= Mehmet Emin İlhan =

Turkish politician

Member of the Grand National Assembly
- In office 7 June 2015 – 1 November 2015
- Constituency: Ağrı (June 2015)

Personal details
- Party: Peoples' Democratic Party (HDP)
- Education: Yüzüncü Yıl University
- Occupation: Politician

Mehmet Emin İlhan is a Turkish politician from the Peoples' Democratic Party (HDP), who served as a Member of Parliament for the electoral district of Ağrı from 7 June to 1 November 2015.

== Early life and career ==
İlhan graduated from primary and secondary education in the district of Doğubeyazıt and attended Yüzüncü Yıl University Faculty of Mathematics between 1997 and 2002. He became a teacher in the city of Van in 2002.

== Political career ==
İlhan was active in the Youth Wing of the People's Democracy Party (HADEP) during his student years. He was elected as a HDP Member of Parliament for Ağrı in the June 2015 general election, but lost his seat in the November 2015 snap election.

== See also ==
- 25th Parliament of Turkey
