= Ekrem Çelebi =

Turkish politician

Ekrem Çelebi (born 17 September 1965 in Patnos, Turkey) is a Turkish politician and member of Turkish Parliament. He is a member of Justice and development party in Turkey and deputy for Ağrı. He served as the chairman of the board of directors of Yapı and secretary general of the Human and Culture Foundation. In 2011 and 2018 general elections, he was elected as Ağrı MP from the Justice and Development Party.
