= Ağrı =

- Municipality
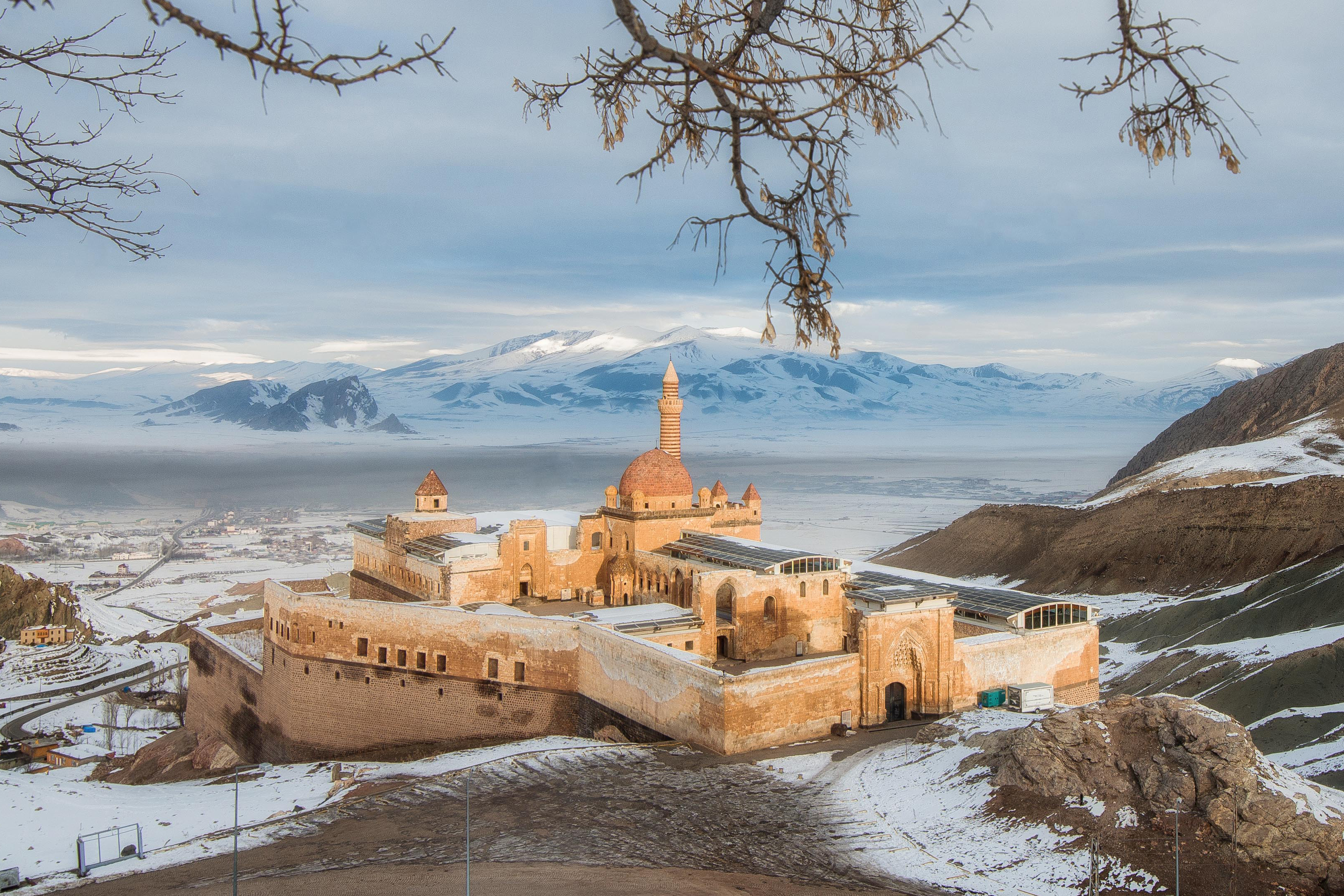
- Ishak Pasha Palace, one of the historical buildings of Ağrı

- Coat of arms

- Location within Turkey
- Coordinates: 39°43′07″N 43°03′03″E
- Country: Turkey
- Province: Ağrı
- District: Ağrı

Government
  - Mayor: Hazal Aras (DEM)
- Elevation: 1,640 m (5,380 ft)
- Population (2022): 148,765
- Time zone: UTC+3 (TRT)
- Website: www.agri.bel.tr

Ağrı (Turkish pronunciation: [ɑːɾɯ]; Armenian: Աղրըի; Kurdish: Agirî) is a city in eastern Turkey, near the border with Iran. The city is populated by Kurds. It is the seat of Ağrı Province and Ağrı District. Its population is 120,390 (2021). It was formerly known as Karaköse. In the early Turkish republican period and until 1946, it was officially known as Karakilise. The city is now named after Ağrı, the Turkish name of Mount Ararat.

== History ==
Ağrı has old settlements such as Doğubeyazıt and Patnos, whose origins date back to the Middle Ages and the Islamic period. Over a long period of time, the region became part of the Urartians, the Achaemenid Empire, the Macedonian Empire founded by Alexander, the Seleucids, and the Armenian Kingdom, which recognized Persian and Roman domination for many years.

With the Islamic conquests that began after the death of Prophet Muhammad in 632, the region came under Muslim rule. The Muslims took this region from the Armenians and the Iranians (Sassanid Empire) and attached it to their own caliphate, and managed to have a say in the region for a long time. The first Muslims to settle in the region were settled in 872 during the Abbasid period.

The city came under Seljuk rule from the Byzantine rule for a short time after the 1048 Battle of Kaperton. The Mongols conquered all of Anatolia including Ağrı in the Battle of Kose Dağ in 1243 and the city was later included in the Ilkhanate Khanate established in 1256.

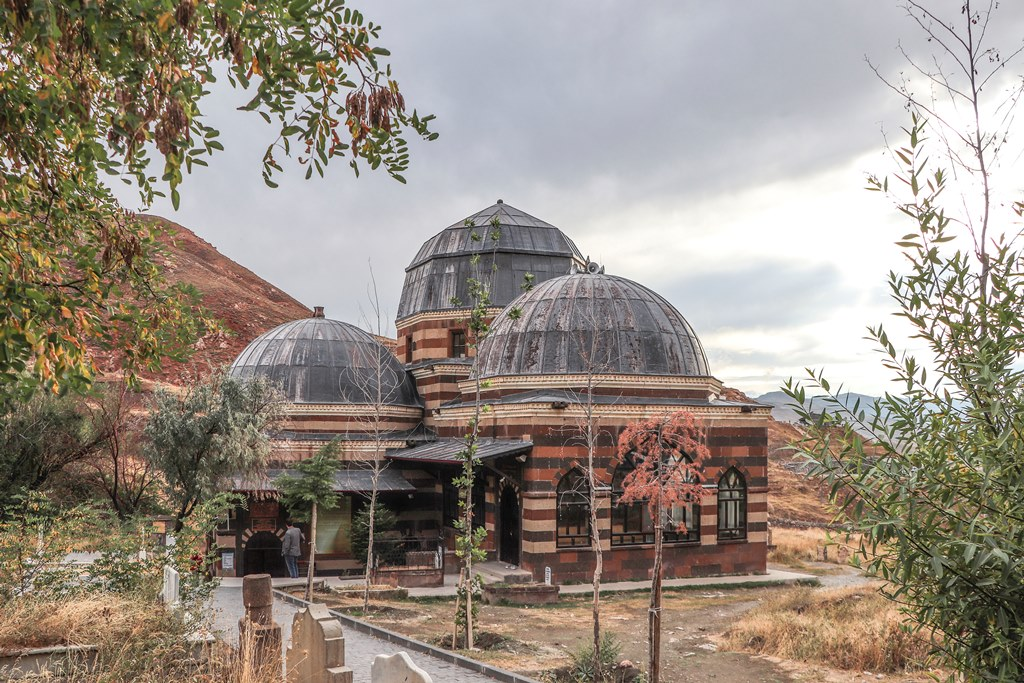
Tomb of Ehmede Khani

Shah Ismail founded the Safavid state in 1501 and conquered Ağrı and its surroundings in his eastern Anatolian campaign in 1503. With the Battle of Chaldiran in 1514, the city under Safavid control came under Ottoman rule. In the 17th century, the famous Kurdish astronomer, geographer, philosopher and Islamic scholar Ehmede Xani came to this city. He received education in the Beyazıt Palace and developed his ideas there.

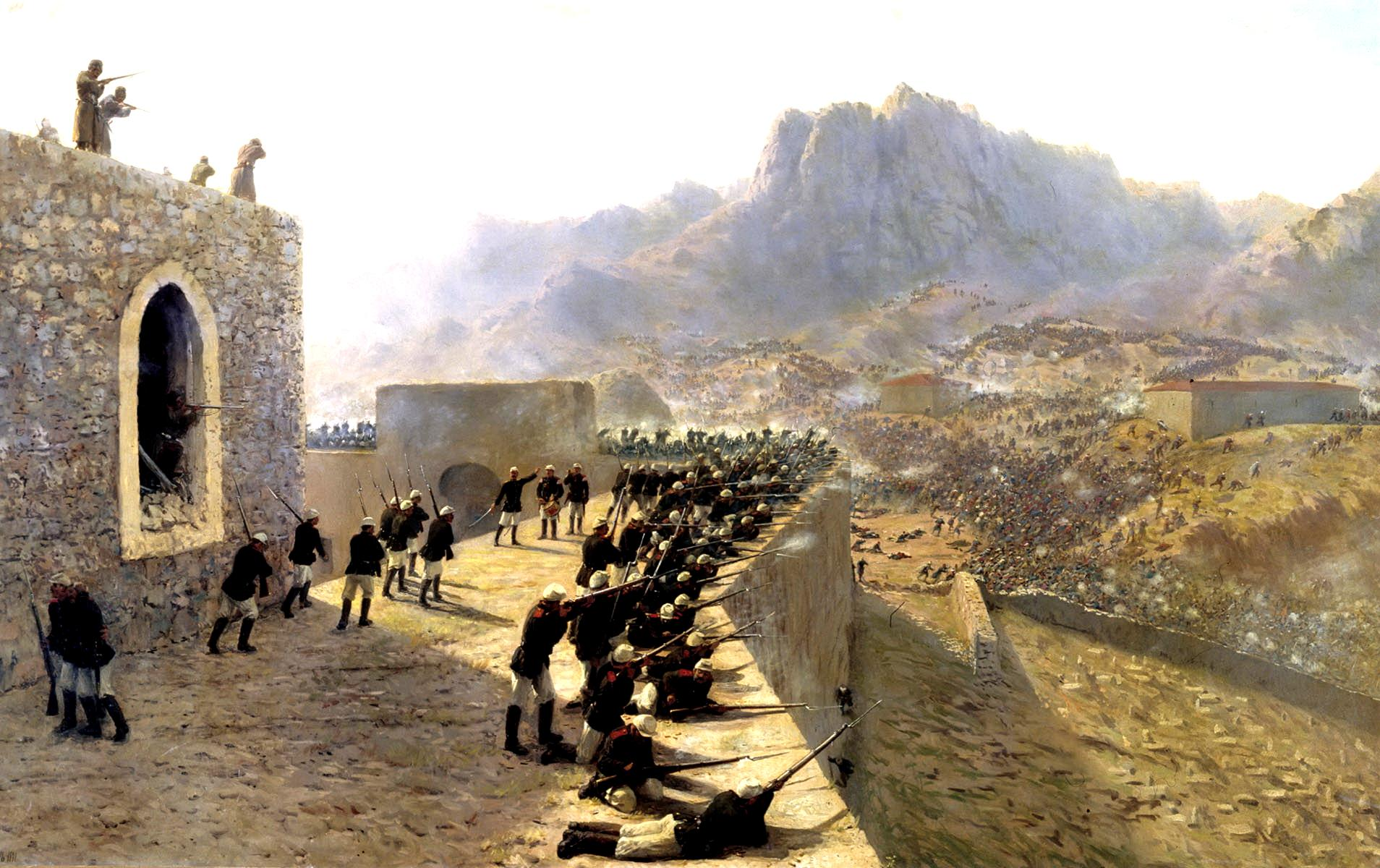
Defence of Doğubayazıt during the Russo-Turkish War (1877–78) by Lev Lagorio

The Dogubayazit district in the 19th century he town witnessed conflicts in the Ottoman–Persian War, when Abbas Mirza, commander-in-chief of Qajar Iran, occupied the town in 1821, and later in 1856, when it was attacked by Russia and taken by the Russians during the Russo-Turkish War (1877–1878). When the Russians retreated, most of the local Armenians left with them to build Yeni Beyazıt (now Gavar in Armenia) on the shores of Lake Sevan.

The current town center was founded around 1860 by a group of Armenian merchants from Bitlis with the name Karakilise (قره‌کلیسا, lit. 'the black church') that became known to the local population as Karakise, and this version was turned officially to Karaköse at the beginning of the Republican era. This name was changed to Ağrı by 1946.

In the years of 1927 to 1931, the region was under the occupation of the Kurdish separatist movements, which gained to establish an unrecognized state named Republic of Ararat which was led by several Kurdish leaders, some of the Main were Ibrahim Heski and Ihsan Nuri.

In the medieval period, the district's administrative centre was located at Alashkert, once an important town. The "kara kilise" or "black church" that gave the town its name was a medieval Armenian church. In 1895 H. F. B. Lynch stayed in Karakilise and wrote that it had between 1500 and 2000 inhabitants, was nearly two-thirds Armenian, and that a barracks for a locally recruited Kurdish Hamidiye regiment had been recently located in the town.

The Armenian population of the town and surrounding valley was massacred by the Ottoman troops, assisted by tribal Kurds during the Armenian genocide: a New York Times report from March 1915 mentions the Alashkert valley being covered with the bodies of men, women, and children.

== Economy and infrastructure ==
Ağrı contains most of the industry in Ağrı Province, where the main economic activity is agriculture and animal husbandry. There is Ağrı Meat and Milk Factory. The ELDESAN leather factory is one of the biggest in the region. There are also a sugar factory, shoe factory, flour mills, agricultural equipment manufacturing sites, brick factory, lime factory, furniture factory, dairy factory and textile mills.

North of Ağrı, there is a longwave broadcasting station with 2 250 metres tall guyed masts, broadcasting on 162 kHz with 1000 kW.

It is a very poor region with extremely cold winters. Most people live by grazing animals on the mountainside. Despite being home to a university, few people manage to attend; people tend to marry in their teens, and families with ten or more children are common. The local MP Fatma Salman Kotan has written of the need to erode the patriarchal nature of society in the region.

== Demographics ==
On the eve of the First World War, 8,180 Armenians lived in the kaza of Karakilise. The city itself had a total population of 4,500, half of them being Armenians. The town had two Armenian schools. Ağrı and its surrounding province are predominantly Kurdish-speaking. Scholars examining the demographics of eastern Turkey's Kurdish-inhabited regions have identified Ağrı Province as one of the areas with the highest concentration of Kurdish speakers. The predominant spoken language of the province is Kurmanji (Northern Kurdish), the most widely spoken Kurdish dialect in Turkey.

== Climate ==
Ağrı has a dry-summer warm-summer humid continental climate (Dsb) under Köppen and a warm summer continental climate (Dcb) under Trewartha classification. Summers are generally brief but warm with cool nights. The average high temperature in August is roughly 30 °C (86 °F). Winters are very cold. The average low January temperature is −16 °C (3 °F). It snows a lot in winter, staying for an average of four months in the city. The highest recorded temperature was 39.9 °C (103.8 °F) on 10 August 1961. The lowest recorded temperature in Ağrı was −45.6 °C (−50.1 °F) on 20 January 1972. The city receives an average of 537 millimetres of precipitation per year. The rainiest months are April and May, while the driest is August. The highest recorded snow thickness was 225 cm (88.6 inches) on 21 February 1985.

Climate data for Ağrı (1991–2020, extremes 1940–2023) (elevation:1646 m)
Month	Jan	Feb	Mar	Apr	May	Jun	Jul	Aug	Sep	Oct	Nov	Dec	Year
Record high °C (°F)	9.6 (49.3)	13.0 (55.4)	21.5 (70.7)	27.2 (81.0)	32.7 (90.9)	37.9 (100.2)	39.8 (103.6)	39.9 (103.8)	35.3 (95.5)	29.2 (84.6)	19.8 (67.6)	16.0 (60.8)	39.9 (103.8)
Mean daily maximum °C (°F)	−4.6 (23.7)	−2.6 (27.3)	3.7 (38.7)	12.9 (55.2)	18.8 (65.8)	24.9 (76.8)	29.8 (85.6)	30.8 (87.4)	25.7 (78.3)	18.0 (64.4)	8.2 (46.8)	−1.1 (30.0)	13.7 (56.7)
Daily mean °C (°F)	−10.0 (14.0)	−8.6 (16.5)	−1.7 (28.9)	6.7 (44.1)	11.9 (53.4)	16.9 (62.4)	21.3 (70.3)	21.8 (71.2)	16.7 (62.1)	9.8 (49.6)	1.5 (34.7)	−6.0 (21.2)	6.7 (44.1)
Mean daily minimum °C (°F)	−14.8 (5.4)	−13.8 (7.2)	−6.4 (20.5)	1.4 (34.5)	5.5 (41.9)	8.9 (48.0)	12.9 (55.2)	13.0 (55.4)	7.8 (46.0)	2.9 (37.2)	−3.7 (25.3)	−10.2 (13.6)	0.3 (32.5)
Record low °C (°F)	−45.6 (−50.1)	−42.8 (−45.0)	−39.6 (−39.3)	−22.2 (−8.0)	−9.0 (15.8)	−3.0 (26.6)	1.7 (35.1)	0.0 (32.0)	−4.1 (24.6)	−13.0 (8.6)	−31.6 (−24.9)	−39.8 (−39.6)	−45.6 (−50.1)
Average precipitation mm (inches)	36.4 (1.43)	39.5 (1.56)	49.3 (1.94)	75.1 (2.96)	76.4 (3.01)	42.8 (1.69)	22.6 (0.89)	13.7 (0.54)	20.9 (0.82)	51.5 (2.03)	41.8 (1.65)	42.9 (1.69)	512.9 (20.19)
Average precipitation days	10.9	10.67	11.97	15.23	16.23	9.87	6.90	4.73	4.8	9.2	7.43	10.87	118.8
Average snowy days	10.1	8.4	6.3	1.3	0.1	0	0	0	0	0	1.5	6.6	34.3
Average relative humidity (%)	78.3	78.4	76	69.4	66.6	60	53.7	50	52.9	64.6	72.8	79.5	66.8
Mean monthly sunshine hours	65.1	86.6	129.1	168.6	229.2	279.4	312.2	301.6	268.2	206.8	134.3	57.9	2,239
Mean daily sunshine hours	2.3	3.2	4.3	5.7	7.4	9.4	10.1	9.9	9.0	6.8	4.6	2.3	6.2
Source 1: Turkish State Meteorological Service
Source 2: NOAA (humidity, sun 1991-2020), Meteomanz (snow days 2008-2023)

== Notable people ==
- Ebru Yaşar (1977*), musician, pop music singer
- Şakiro (1936-1996), Kurdish Dengbêj singer
- Yaşar Ören (1942*), cross-country skier
- Celal Adan (1951*), politician
- Nizamettin Ariç (1956*), contemporary Kurdish singer, composer and director
- Hasan Murat Mercan (1959*), Turkish politician and diplomat
- Abdullah Yilmaz (1961*), cross-country skier
- Erhan Dursun (1962*), cross-country skier
- Cesim Gökçe (1968*), politician
- Fatma Salman Kotan (1970*), Member of Parliament for Ağri
- Mehmet Emin İlhan (1979*), politician
- Berdan Öztürk (1980*), politician
- Dirayet Taşdemir (1982*), politician
- Türkan Erişmiş (1984*), middle distance runner
- Adem Kılıçcı (1986*), amateur boxer in the middleweight division
- Nejla Demir (1988*), Turkish engineer and politician
- Nesim Turan (1992*), para table tennis player
- Bayram Malkan (1994*), boxer in the light heavyweight
- Zeynep Çelik (1996*), Paralympic judoka
- Kader Çelik (2001*), Paralympian goalball player
- Abdullah Şahindere (2003*), Turkish footballer
