= Nejla =

Nejla (Arabic: نجلاء Najlāʼ; Arabic pronunciation: [nad͡ʒˈlaːʔ]) is an Arabic given name for females, which means 'large-eyed'. Notable people with the name include:

== Given name ==
- Nejla Abu-Izzedin (1907–2008), Lebanese historian
- Nejla Ateş (1932–1995), Turkish belly dancer
- Nejla Demir (born 1988), Turkish engineer and politician
- Nejla Işık, Turkish environmental activist and community leader
- Nejla Moalla (born 1963), Tunisian engineer and politician
- Nejla Y. Yatkin (born 1970), German-American choreographer
- Princess Nejla bint Asem (born 1988), Jordanian princess

== See also ==
- Necla, Turkish spelling
