= Selcuk University Department of Geological Engineering =

Geological Engineering Department of Selcuk University, Selcuk University Faculty of Engineering and Architecture what is an optional section. Geological Engineering Department is located on the Afyon way to 20th km in Alaeddin Keykubat Campus. Tram and bus transportation between campus and city center are provided with. Geological Engineering Department authorized staff and more than 34 years of knowledge has grown continue to add new ones to 1500 engineers.

== History ==
The Selcuk University Faculty of Science Department Earth Science began classes in the 1976-1977 school year. In 1982 with the name of Geological Engineering have been connected to the Engineering and Architecture Department.

== Academic Structure ==
- General Geology
- Mining Bearings-Geochemistry
- Mineralogy-Petrography
- Applied Geology
