= Özlem Çerçioğlu =

Turkish politician (born 1968)

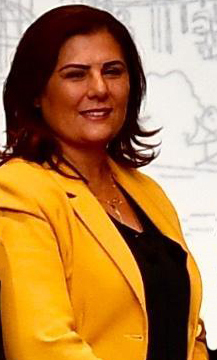

Member of the Grand National Assembly of Turkey
- In office 14 November 2002 – 30 March 2009
- Constituency: Aydın

Mayor of Aydın
- Incumbent
- Assumed office 30 March 2009
- Preceded by: İlhami Ortekin

Personal details
- Born: 11 August 1968 (age 58) Aydın, Turkey
- Party: Justice and Development Party (2025–present)
- Other political affiliations: Republican People's Party (2002–2025)
- Spouse: Ercan Çerçioğlu
- Children: 2
- Education: Selçuk University
- Website: Government website

Özlem Çerçioğlu (born 11 August 1968) is a Turkish politician who has served as the mayor of Aydın since 2009. She has been a member of the IslamistJustice and Development Party (AKP) since 2025, after previously spending 23 years in the secularist Republican People's Party (CHP). While with the CHP, she became Aydın’s first female mayor. Her 2025 switch to the AKP sparked significant political controversy and criticism from CHP supporters.

She was born in Nazilli, a district of Aydın, in 1968. She graduated from Selçuk University in 1988. She served as a member of the Grand National Assembly from 2002 to 2009 during the 22nd and 23rd legislative terms, representing Aydın for the CHP. She was elected as mayor of Aydın in 2009, becoming the first female mayor of the metropolitan municipality, and was re-elected again in 2014 and 2019.

On 14 August 2025, Çerçioğlu left the CHP for the ruling AKP due to internal party issues while expressing her desire to serve "under the patronage of Erdoğan." Çerçioğlu's resignation from her party of 23 years, where she had served two terms in parliament and four terms as mayor, drew criticism from the provincial and district branches of the CHP in Aydın. On the same day, the CHP Provincial Presidency organized a rally titled “Aydın Stands for its Will” in front of the Aydın Metropolitan Municipality building to protest her decision. CHP leader Özgür Özel accused Çerçioğlu of leaving the party due to threats from the ruling government and that her defection was a "stealing of votes". He further claimed that ongoing corruption investigations and blackmailing against several CHP mayors, including Çerçioğlu, were a key factor behind their defections to the AKP. After her switch to AKP, Çerçioğlu was acquitted in the cases in which she had been tried on charges of bid rigging and abuse of office and her family company Jantsa achieved privileged merchant status by the Turkish government.
