= Güneysu =

- Municipality
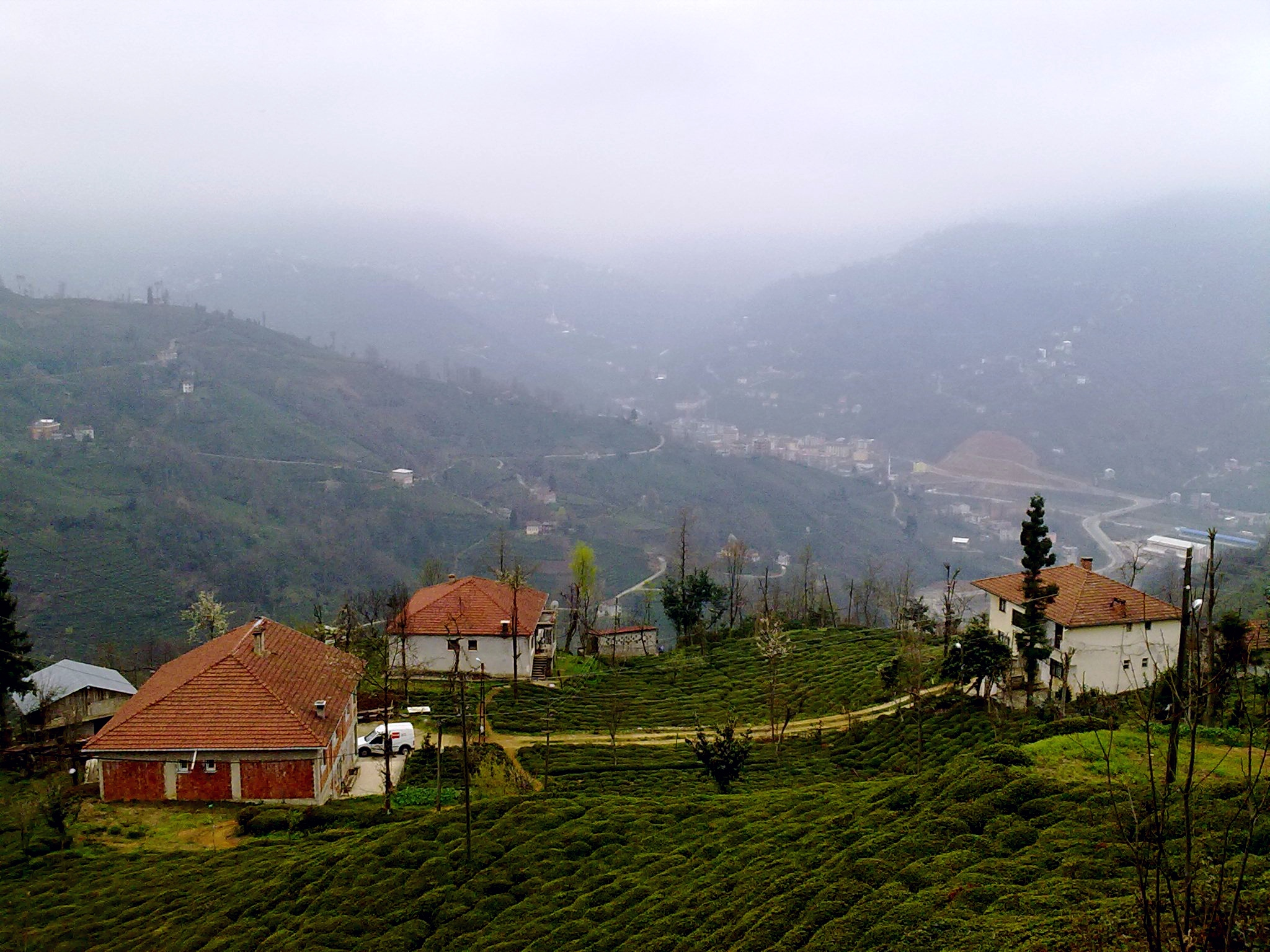

- Location within Turkey
- Coordinates: 40°58′41″N 40°36′49″E
- Country: Turkey
- Province: Rize
- District: Güneysu

Government
  - Mayor: Rıfat Özer (AKP)
- Population (2021): 8,722
- Time zone: UTC+3 (TRT)
- Climate: Cfa
- Website: guneysu.bel.tr

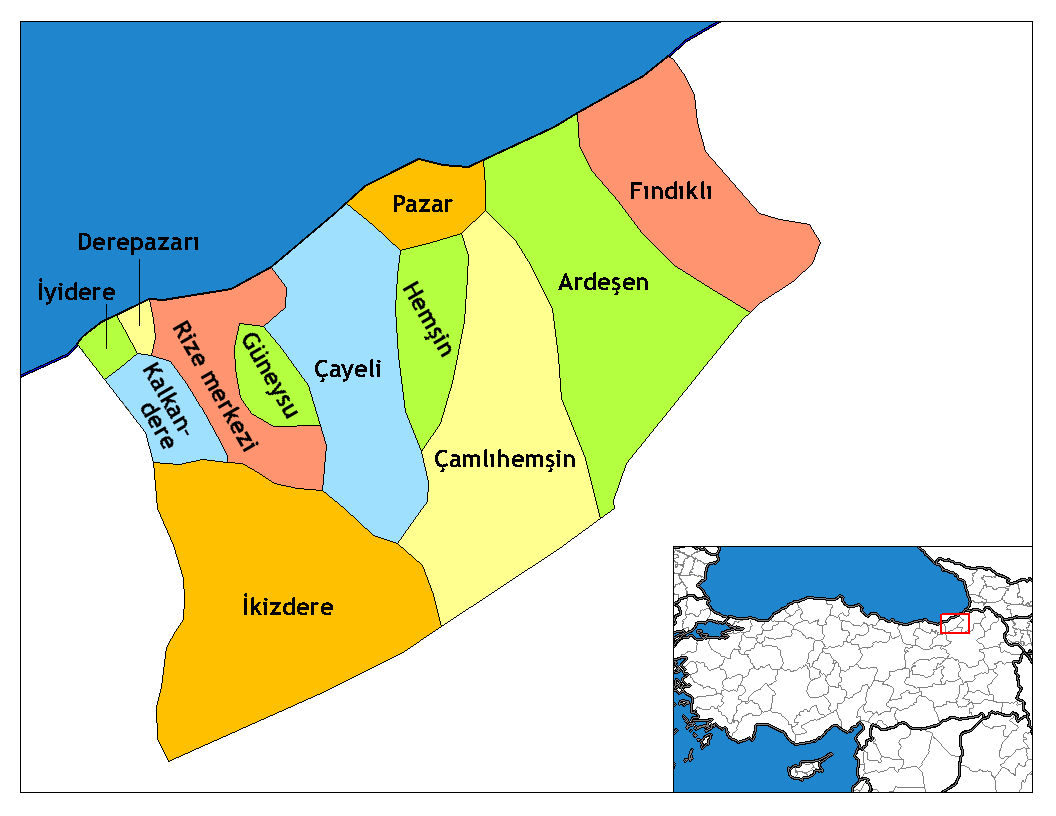
Rize location Güneysu

Güneysu is a town in Rize Province in the Black Sea region of Turkey, inland from the city of Rize. It is the seat of Güneysu District. Its population is 8,722 (2021).

== History ==
Güneysu was formerly named in Greek Potamya (Ποταμιὰ, "river village") and the name persists in local usage to this day, as Güneysu stands on a plain watered by the Potamya river, a tributary of the Taşlıdere (or Askoroz) river (the ancient and Byzantine Ἄσκουρος ποταμός).

== Geography ==
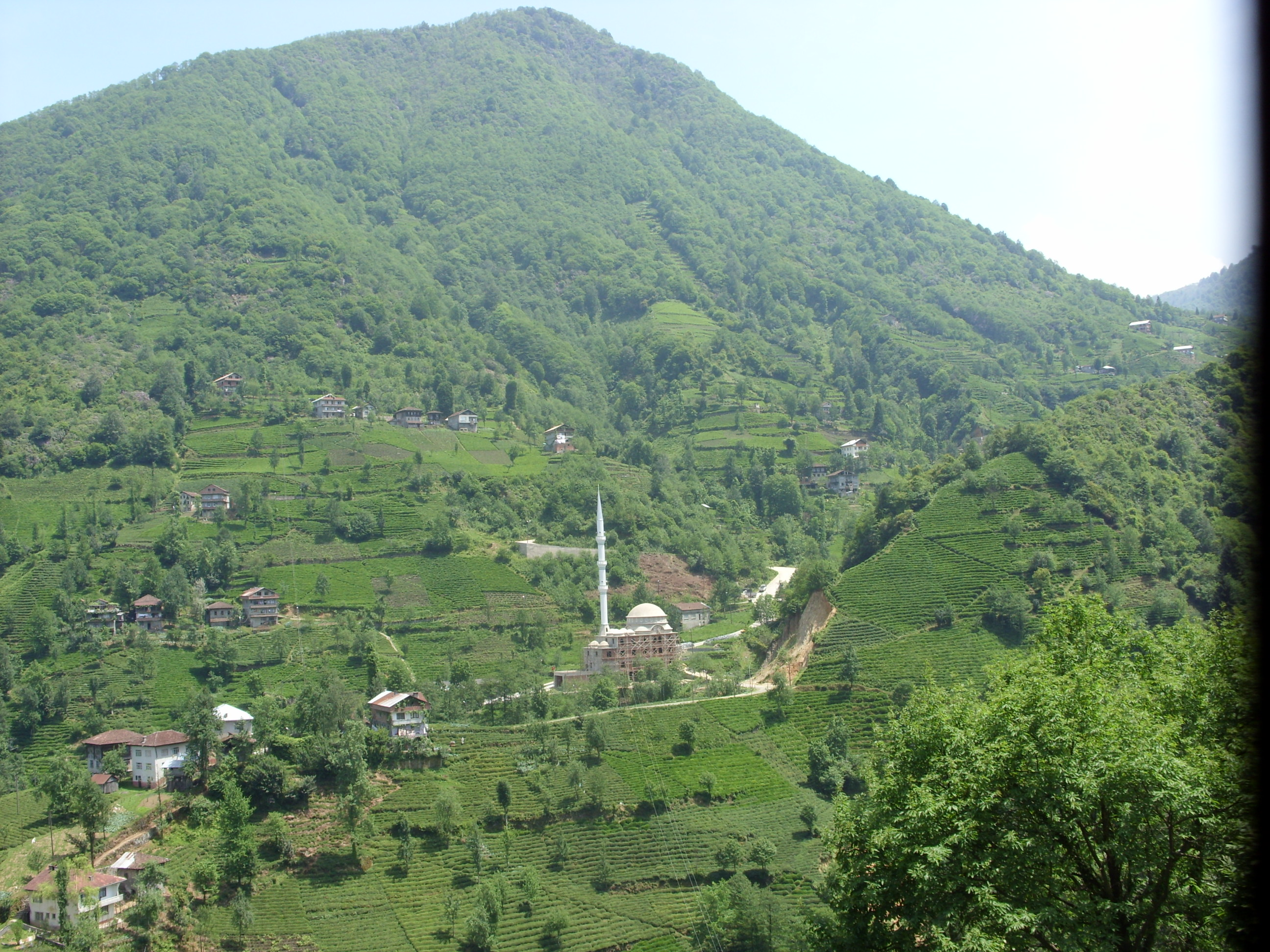
Asmalıırmak village-Güneysu

This is a hilly district of rivers and valleys, inland from the Black Sea coast, with peaks inland as high as 2000 m. The climate is wet, hence the number of valleys that have been cut through by mountain streams. Thus, floods and landslides are a constant threat even today. The coastal vegetation is broad-leaved but the higher land is pine forest, with Alpine plants in the high meadows up in the Kaçkar Mountains.

Güneysu is an impoverished rural district losing much of its population as they migrate to jobs elsewhere (some of Turkey's biggest construction firms have their roots here for example). The main source of income is growing tea and in recent years kiwifruit. Other crops are mainly grown in family gardens for personal use. The only industry is tea processing, and Güneysu is a centre of this for the Rize province.

== Climate ==
Güneysu has a humid subtropical climate (Köppen: Cfa).

Climate data for Güneysu
| Month | Jan | Feb | Mar | Apr | May | Jun | Jul | Aug | Sep | Oct | Nov | Dec | Year |
|---|---|---|---|---|---|---|---|---|---|---|---|---|---|
| Daily mean °C (°F) | 5.6 (42.1) | 6.1 (43.0) | 7.6 (45.7) | 11.5 (52.7) | 15.4 (59.7) | 19.3 (66.7) | 22.0 (71.6) | 22.2 (72.0) | 19.4 (66.9) | 15.3 (59.5) | 11.4 (52.5) | 7.8 (46.0) | 13.6 (56.5) |
| Average precipitation mm (inches) | 176 (6.9) | 137 (5.4) | 119 (4.7) | 81 (3.2) | 82 (3.2) | 115 (4.5) | 95 (3.7) | 125 (4.9) | 162 (6.4) | 210 (8.3) | 189 (7.4) | 195 (7.7) | 1,686 (66.3) |
Source: Climate-Data.org

== People from Güneysu ==
- Recep Tayyip Erdoğan — Turkish politician, 25th Prime Minister of Turkey (2003–2014) and currently the 12th President of Turkey (2014–present); family hails from Güneysu.
- Halil Mutlu — Turkish American physician and political lobbyist; cousin of Turkish president Recep Tayyip Erdoğan.
