= Güneysu District =

District of Rize Province, Turkey

- District
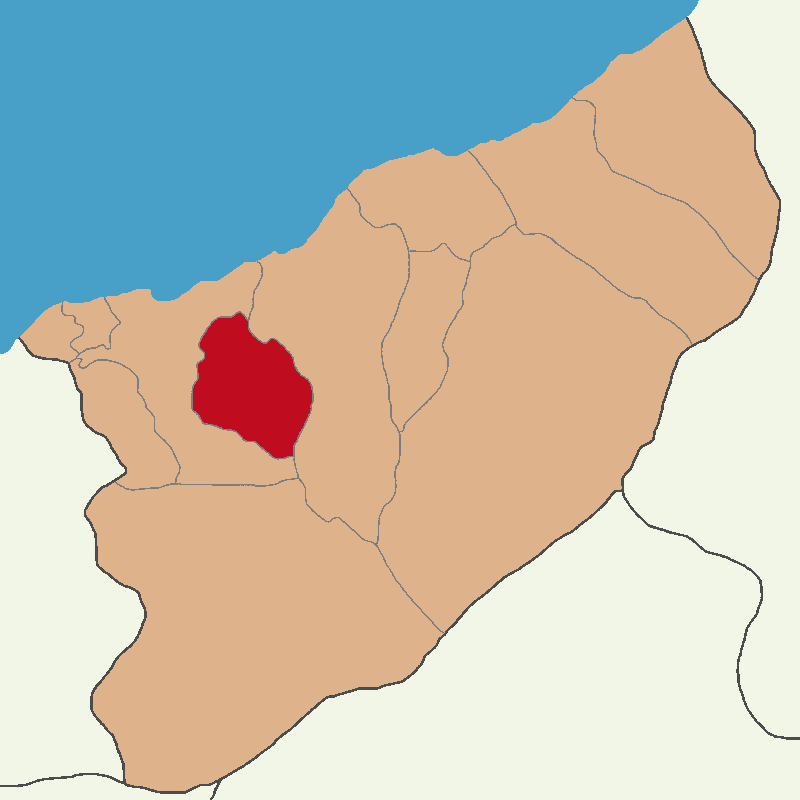
- Map showing Güneysu District in Rize Province

- Location in Turkey
- Coordinates: 40°39′N 40°55′E
- Country: Turkey
- Province: Rize
- Seat: Güneysu

Government
  - Kaymakam: Muhammed İkbal Yelek
- Area: 159 km^{2} (61 sq mi)
- Population (2021): 16,066
  - Density: 100/km^{2} (260/sq mi)
- Time zone: UTC+3 (TRT)
- Website: www.guneysu.gov.tr

Güneysu District is a district of the Rize Province of Turkey. Its seat is the town of Güneysu. Its area is 159 km^{2}, and its population is 16,066 (2021).

== Composition ==
There is one municipality in Güneysu District:

- Güneysu

There are 18 villages in Güneysu District:

- Asmalıırmak
- Ballıdere
- Başköy
- Bulutlu
- Çamlıca
- Dumankaya
- Gürgen
- Islahiye
- Kıbledağı
- Ortaköy
- Tepebaşı
- Yarımada
- Yenicami
- Yeniköy
- Yeşilköy
- Yeşilyurt
- Yukarıislahiye
- Yüksekköy
