= Necla =

Necla is a Turkish feminine given name. People named Necla include:

- Necla Akdoğan (born 1971), Turkish women's footballer, referee and manager
- Necla Güngör (born 1981), Turkish football manager
- Necla Kelek (born 1957), Turkish-German feminist and social scientist
- Necla Nazır (born 1956), Turkish retired singer and actress
- Necla Pur (born 1943), Turkish economist
- Necla Sultan (1926–2006), Ottoman princess
- Nejla Ates (1932–2005), Turkish belly dancer (with anglicized spelling of Nejla from Turkish Necla)

== See also ==
- Nejla, Arabic name
