= Raşit Küçük =

Turkish academic (1947–2022)

- Born: 1947; Akseki, Antalya, Turkey
- Died: 22 November 2022 (aged 74–75); Istanbul, Turkey
- Occupation: Islamicist

Academic background
- Education: Marmara University
- Thesis: Kur'ân ve Sünnette Sevgi Kavramı: Özellikle Allah Sevgisi (1984)

Raşit Küçük (1947 – 22 November 2022) was a Turkish academic with a focus on hadith scholarship and the life history of Muhammad. Born in Akseki District, he entered an İmam Hatip school in Antalya after his primary studies. He continued to focus on religious studies through university, defending a dissertation on the concept of love in the Qur'an and Sunnah in 1983. Küçük taught at Marmara University in Istanbul, becoming a full professor in 2003 and serving as the dean of the Faculty of Theology from 2007 through 2011. Küçük was appointed to the high council of Presidency of Religious Affairs in 2014, serving as that council's chairman until 2016. For the last years of his life, Küçük served as the chairman of the Turkish Religious Affairs Foundation.

== Early life ==
Küçük was born in 1947 in Menteşbey, a remote and poor village in the district of Akseki, Antalya, Turkey. He was the eldest child born to a religiously devout family, and during his primary school studies he learned the tenets of Islam. He completed his primary studies in 1959 and initially applied to attend a teacher training school. However, at the recommendation of mufti Mustafa Sıtkı Efendi, he enrolled at the Antalya Imam Hatip School.

At this İmam Hatip school, Küçük studied a range of subjects, with a particular focus on Islam. He gained a reputation as a diligent student, which was supported by extracurricular lessons from Mustafa Sıtkı Efendi. Küçük completed his studies in 1966 and found employment at the Akseki Mufti's Office. Despite advancing to the position of deputy mufti, Küçük sought further education. He thus enroled at the Higher Islamic Institute in Konya, where most of his classes were taught by professors at the Ankara University's Faculty of Theology. Already fluent in Ottoman Turkish, Küçük learned Arabic while enroled.

While in Konya, Küçük became involved in politics, first as a member of the Necmettin Erbakan campaign team in 1969 and later as an early member of the National Order Party. He later was associated with the National Salvation Party, Welfare Party, and Virtue Party. However, he did not consider himself a politician, stating in a 2022 interview that his focus had been on the theoretical aspects of politics, including its philosophy and ethics. Küçük also helped establish a local constituent of the Turkish National Student Union, with which he organized lectures by Necip Fazıl Kısakürek, Tahsin Demiray, and Arif Nihat Asya. With the student union, he also travelled to give sermons and published a magazine titled Yeni Ümit (New Hope).

== Career in education ==
Küçük graduated in 1970, then began teaching religious studies at high schools throughout Erzurum. He entered administration at the Erzurum Imam-Hatip School, serving as deputy principal and later principal. At the same time, he furthered his education, taking exams in Sufism, tafsir (Qur'anic interpretation), and Turkish Islamic literature. He began teaching at the tertiary level in 1975, when he became a lecturer at the Erzurum Higher Islamic Institute. He recalled his networks established during this period, with colleagues such as Muhammad Hamidullah and Muhammed Tayyip Okiç benefitting his professional development.

Küçük began his doctoral studies in 1978, gaining acceptance with essays titled Abdullah İbnü’l-Mübârek ve Hadis İlmindeki Yeri ("Abdullah Ibn al-Mubarak and His Place in the Science of Hadith") and Hicrî İkinci Asır Müellifleri ("Authors of the Second Century Hijri"). In 1980, following the Turkish coup d'état, Küçük was detained for two weeks before being released without trial. He was exiled from the region and sent to Istanbul. There, he transferred his studies to Marmara University to complete his degree.

Küçük's dissertation, Kur'ân ve Sünnette Sevgi Kavramı: Özellikle Allah Sevgisi (The Concept of Love in the Qur'an and Sunnah, with a Focus on God's Love), was defended in 1983. Drawing on a range of Islamic texts, particularly the Kutub al-Sittah and works of Quranic exegesis, Küçük argued that God's love must be considered first, as all other love stems from it. He conceptualized love not as a question of words, but rather as requiring "a holistic approach encompassing faith, deeds, and morality." (Note: Original: "Sevginin, sadece sözler ve karşılıklı temennilerle gerçekleşebilecek bir karakter taşımadığı, bunun aksine, iman, amel ve ahlak bütünlüğü gerektirdiği ortaya konulmaya çalışılmıştır.") This dissertation was granted an award from the Turkish Authors' Association after being published in 1991 under the title Sevgi Medeniyeti (Civilization of Love).

Remaining in the field of education, in 1984 Küçük worked with İsmail Yiğit to prepare a biography of Muhammad for secondary students; the resulting textbook remained in use for a decade. Between 1990 and 1991, he undertook research in Damascus. In 1993, working with Mustafa Öcal, he published Türk Millî Eğitiminde Din Kültürü ve Ahlâk Bilgisi Dersleri (Religious Culture and Moral Knowledge Lessons in Turkish National Education). This was followed in 1997 by Riyâzü’s-sâlihîn: Peygamberimizden Hayat Ölçüleri (Riyad al-Salihin: Life Lessons from Our Prophet), a critical translation of Al-Nawawi's The Meadows of the Righteous completed with Yaşar Kandemir and İsmail Lütfi Çakan.

Küçük was made an associate professor at Marmara University in 1997 and a full professor in 2003. From 2007 through 2011, he served as the dean of the Faculty of Theology. In this capacity, he oversaw the refurbishing of the faculty's buildings, including its mosque. Funding was collected through donations, rather than the university. Küçük also served on the university's senate and board of directors.

In his academic life, Küçük focused primarily on the hadiths and on the life history of Muhammad. He advocated for combining formal and informal approaches to education, holding that a holistic approach would best suit the needs of students. He thus wrote extensively for popular readership, including in the magazines İslâm (Islam), Kadın ve Aile (Women and Family), and İlim Sanat (Science and Art). Former student Cemal Ağırman, a professor at Sivas Cumhuriyet University, recalled Küçük as involved in his students' lives, sharing part of his salary with those experiencing financial difficulties.

== Government activities ==
Outside of the university, Küçük participated in several government projects, serving as the chairman of the National Committee on Theology and as the Sub-Committee on Foreign Theology Degree Equivalence, both under the Council of Higher Education. On 19 December 2011, Küçük was appointed to the high council of the Presidency of Religious Affairs, a position he held through 2014. He was later made its chairman, in which capacity he oversaw efforts to standardize fatwas as well as the implementation of a fatwa hotline.

Following his resignation from the Presidency of Religious Affairs, Küçük was appointed the chairman of the Turkish Religious Affairs Foundation. During his eight-year chairmanship, the organization prepared a series of books on first- and second-classical era Islamic literature, as well as introductory texts to Islam and Islamic culture. It also established The Journal of Ottoman Studies and digitized the İslâm Ansiklopedisi.

== Death and legacy ==
Küçük began receiving treatment for cancer in the late 2010s. He died on 22 November 2022. The memorial service was held at Fatih Mosque, Istanbul, with attendants including Vice President Fuat Oktay, former president Abdullah Gül, and Minister of Education Mahmut Özer. After remarks, which included condolences from Governor Ali Yerlikaya, Küçük was interred at the Fatih Mosque cemetery.

In recognition of his contributions, an Imam-Hatip School in Antalya was named after Küçük. A sports center in the Üsküdar district of Istanbul is also named for him.

== Works cited ==
- Ağırman, Cemal (2022). "Vefeyât: Prof. Dr. Raşit Küçük Hocamızın Ardından!" [Obituary: After Our Teacher Prof. Raşit Küçük]. Trabzon Theology Journal (in Turkish). 9 (2): 445–450. doi:10.33718/tid.1220207.
- Erdoğan, Erol; Başar, Veysel; Karaçorlu, Tuba (7 March 2018). "Söz Meclisi: Prof.Dr.Raşit Küçük" [Voice of the People: Prof. Dr. Raşit Küçük]. Tohum (160). Archived from the original on 20 May 2024.
- "Prof. Dr. Raşit Küçük Son Yolculuğuna Uğurlandı" [Prof. Dr. Raşit Küçük Sent on Final Journey] (in Turkish). Government of Istanbul. 2022. Archived from the original on 24 February 2026.
- "TÜBA Üyesi Prof. Dr. Raşit Küçük Vefat Etti" [TÜBA Member Prof. Dr. Raşit Küçük Dies] (in Turkish). Turkish Academy of Sciences. 22 November 2022. Archived from the original on 24 February 2026.
- Uluçam, Müjdat (2024). "Raşi̇t Küçük (1947–2022)". İslam Araştırmaları Dergisi (in Turkish) (51): 173–179. doi:10.26570/isad.1414618.
- Yilmaz, Coşkun. "Küçük, Raşit (1947–2022)". Turkish Encyclopedia of Education. Turkish Education Foundation and Turkish Academy of Sciences. Archived from the original on 24 February 2026.
