= Dirayet Taşdemir =

Turkish politician

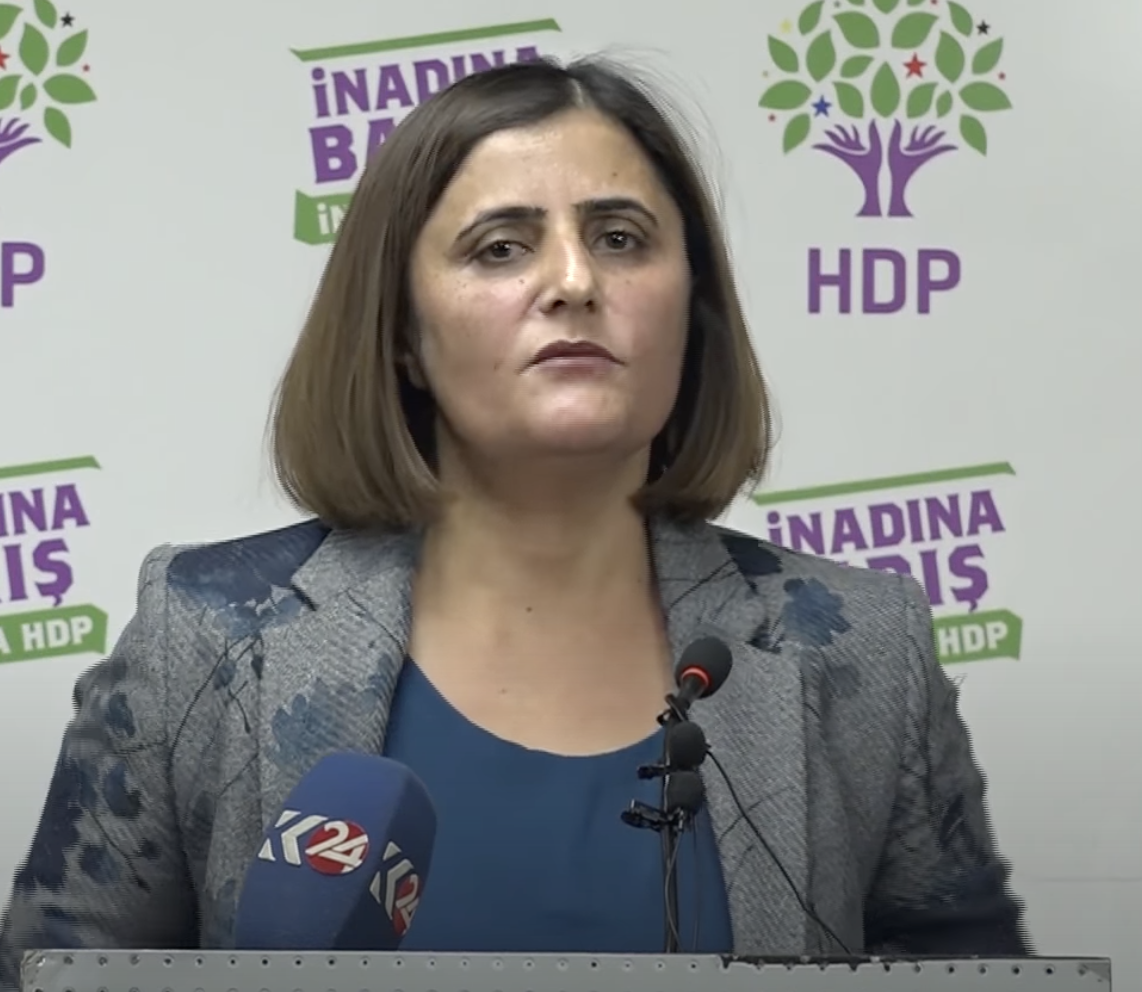
- Taşdemir in 2018

Member of the Grand National Assembly
- In office 7 June 2015 – 14 May 2023
- Constituency: Ağrı (June 2015, Nov 2015, 2018)

Personal details
- Born: 1982 (age 43–44) Ağrı, Turkey
- Party: Peoples' Democratic Party (HDP)
- Education: Mersin University
- Occupation: Sociologist; Archeologist

Dirayet Taşdemir (born 1982) is a Turkish-Kurdish politician from the Peoples' Democratic Party (HDP), who has served as a Member of Parliament for the electoral district of Ağrı since 7 June 2015.

== Early life and career ==
Taşdemir was born in Ağrı in 1982. She graduated from the sociology and archeology departments at Mersin University. She has been an activist for women's rights, having participated in several national and international efforts to advance liberties and rights for women.

== Political career ==
Taşdemir's political career began in the People's Democracy Party (HADEP) Women's Wing, later becoming an advisor responsible for policies directed towards women at the Diyarbakır Metropolitan Municipality in 2008. She was arrested in 2009 during operations conducted towards the Kurdistan Communities Union (KCK), spending 5 years in prison. Taşdemir was elected as a HDP Member of Parliament for Ağrı in the June 2015 general election. On the 17 March 2021, the state prosecutor Bekir Şahin demanded for Taşdemir and 686 other HDP politicians a five-year ban to engage in politics together with a closure of the HDP due to an alleged organizational cooperation with the Kurdistan Workers' Party (PKK)
