= Selçuk University =

Public university in Konya, Turkey

Coordinates: 38°01′35″N 32°30′35″E

- Selçuk University Logo
- Motto: Değişen ve Değiştiren Üniversite
- Motto in English: "The ever-changing and disruptive university"
- Type: Public
- Established: 1975
- Affiliations: EUA, EURAS
- Rector: Prof. Dr. Hüseyin Yılmaz
- Academic staff: 2,700
- Students: 63,000 (2022)
- Undergraduates: 38,000
- Postgraduates: 9,000
- Location: Konya, Turkey
- Colors: Yellow, Black, Blue
- Mascot: Double-headed eagle
- Website: selcuk.edu.tr

University rankings

Regional – Overall
- QS Emerging Europe and Central Asia: 231-240 (2022)

Selçuk University (Turkish: Selçuk Üniversitesi) is a state-owned higher educational institution which was founded 1975 in Konya, Turkey. It is one of the largest universities in Turkey with a student body of 63,000 of which 2,200 are foreign students from 105 countries.

As of 2023, the university is ranked 20th by Times Higher Education, 22nd by METU URAP and 16th by EduRank within Turkey.

== History ==
Selçuk University began education in the academic year of 1976–1977 with two faculties: the Faculty of Science and the Faculty of Literature. It has significantly grown since to become one of the largest and highest-ranked universities in Turkey.

=== 1955 - 1962 ===
A bill to found a university in Konya was prepared in 1955 by the Grand National Assembly of Turkey. Despite gaining a majority of signatures, the bill failed to pass the Ministry of National Education (MEB).

=== 1962 - 1977 ===
In 1962, the Selçuk Education Institute (Turkish: Selçuk Eğitim Enstitüsü) and the Higher Islamic Institute (Turkish: Yüksek İslâm Enstitüsü) were opened under the MEB. This was the first significant step towards founding a university in Konya, and was furthered with the creation of the Association for the Founding and Sustenance of the University (Turkish: Üniversiteyi Kurma ve Yaşatma Derneği) in 1968. The efforts of this association created the core of the present Engineering-Architecture faculty: the Engineering-Architecture college. The college lacked its own building, classes and funding but began teaching in the 1970–1971 academic year in a building belonging to the General Directorate of Child Services. It was titled the Konya State Academy of Architecture and Engineering as per Article 9 of Law No. 1418.

Selçuk university along with four others were founded in 1975 with the passing of the law entitled Law pertaining to the founding of 4 universities, numbered 1873 (Turkish: 4 Üniversitenin Kurulması ile İlgili 1873 Sayılı Kanun) which was published in the Official Gazette of the Republic of Turkey. The university began operating in the 1976–1977 academic year, with two faculties (Faculty of Science and the Faculty of Literature), 7 subjects, 327 students and 2 permanent lecturers.

=== Present Day ===
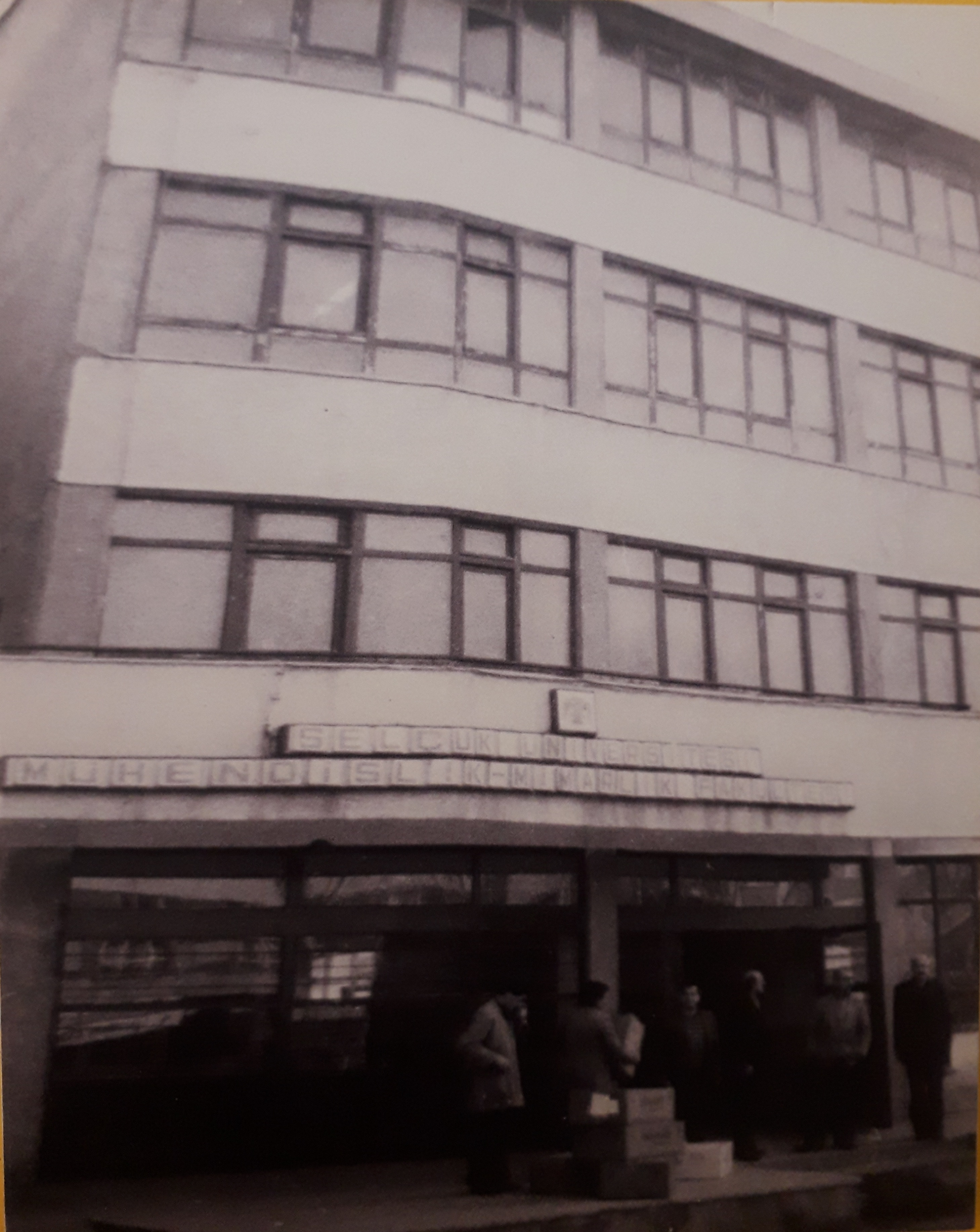
A historical photograph of the Konya State Academy of Architecture and Engineering

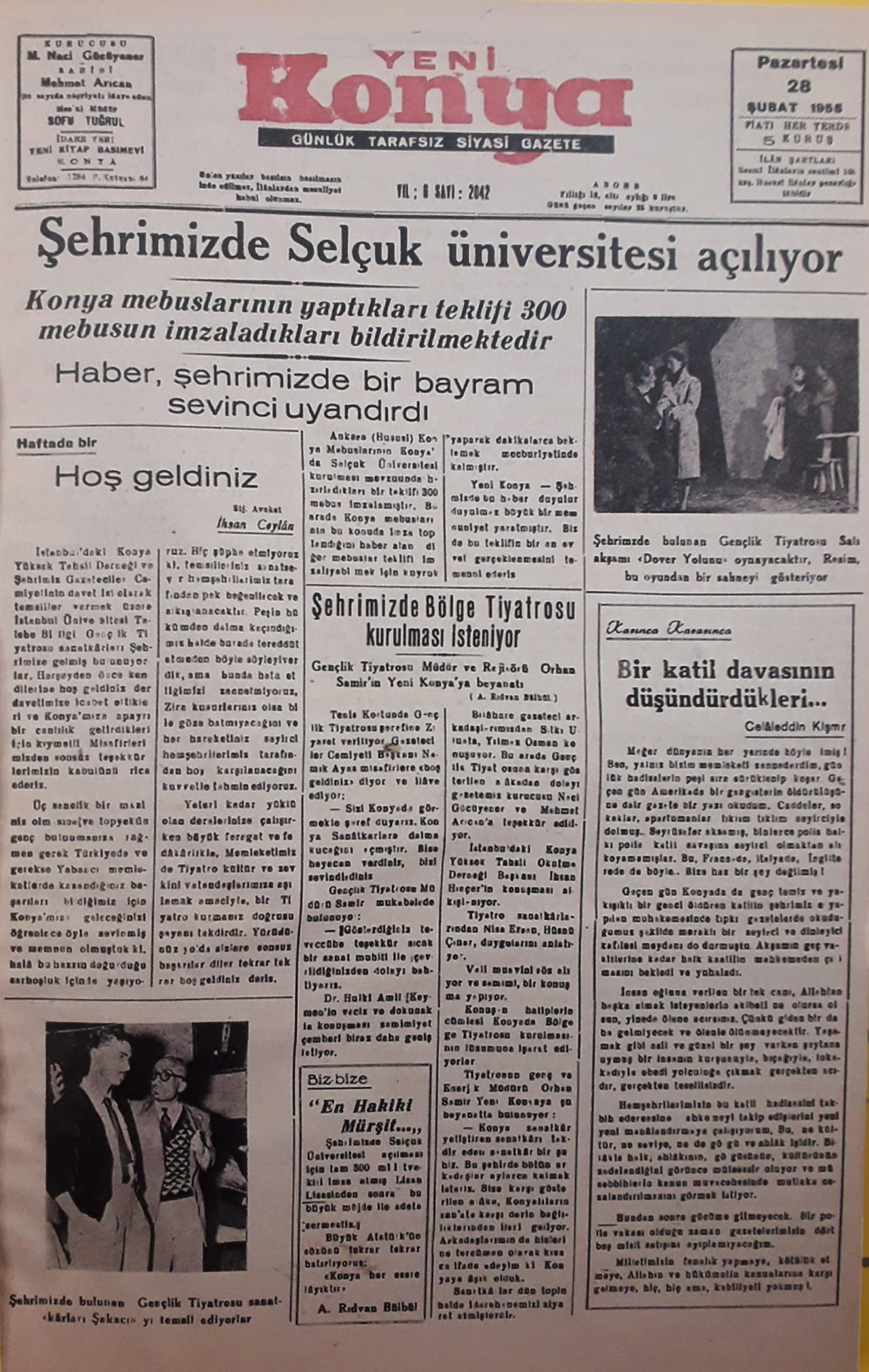
"Selçuk university opens in our city", 28 February 1955

In 2018, a law was passed for the founding of 20 new universities in Turkey. As part of this, 13 existing universities were to have some of their faculties split to create new universities. Konya Technical University (previously Konya University) was established through this, from the Engineering, Architecture, faculties and the Technical Sciences Vocational College that belonged to Selçuk University.

== Student life ==
=== Social activities ===
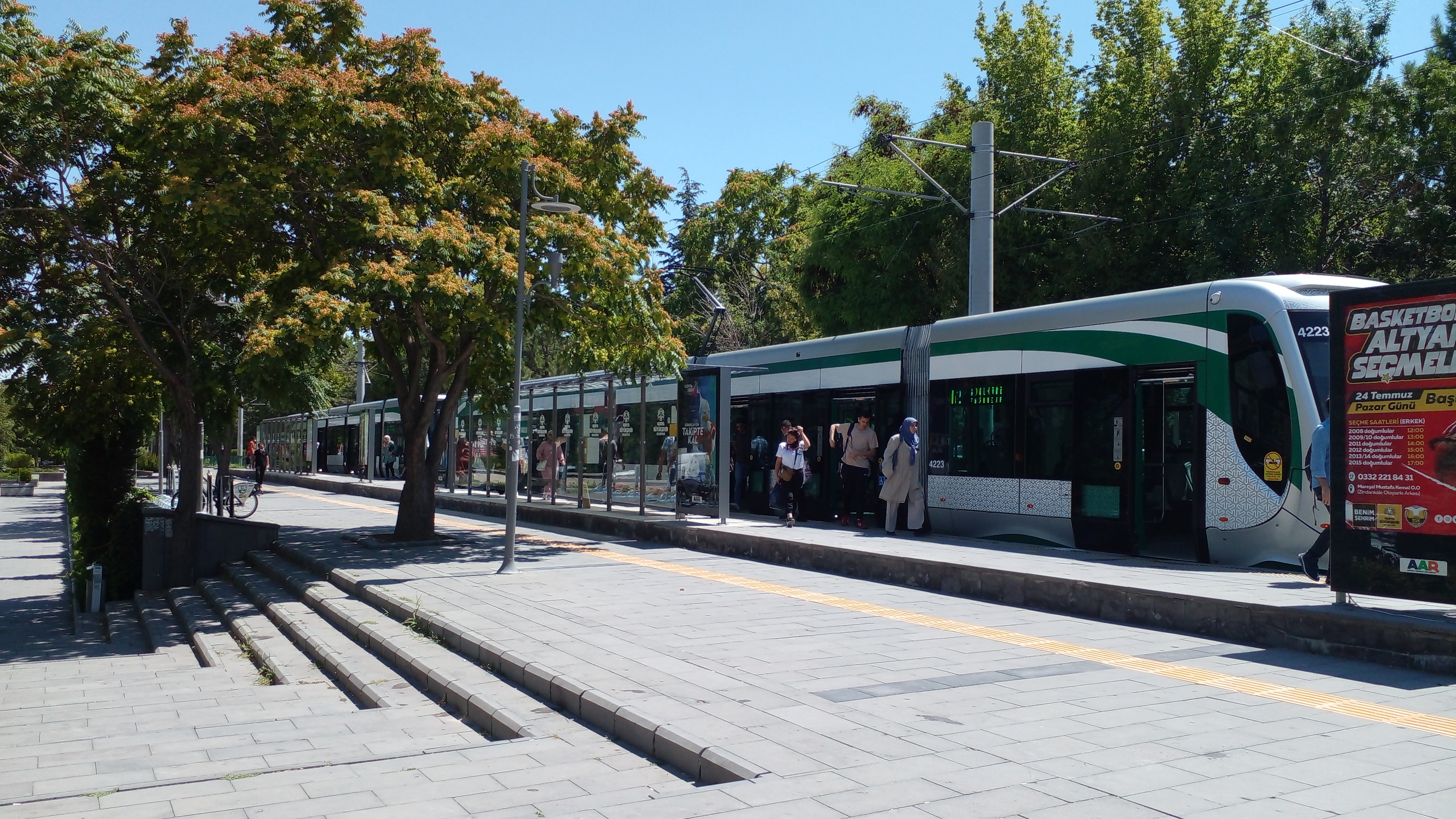
Tram station at the faculty of medicine depicting a Škoda 28 T. 4 tram stops in the No.150 Selçuk University-Alaaddin line are within the university: at the faculties of medicine, engineering, sciences & literature, and law.

At the beginning of each academic year, the university arranges a Welcome Festival (Hoş Geldiniz Şenliği). Every May, the university hosts a six-day Spring Festival (Bahar Şenliği) that is arranged to coincide with the Commemoration of Atatürk, Youth and Sports Day. A sports festival is also organized in May (Spor Şenlikleri). A new year concert is held at the end of December (Yeni Yıl Konseri).

The Gökkuşağı shopping center within the campus hosts restaurants, bookstores, supermarkets among other amenities.

=== Student societies ===
The university hosts 22 sports teams and 148 student communities & clubs.

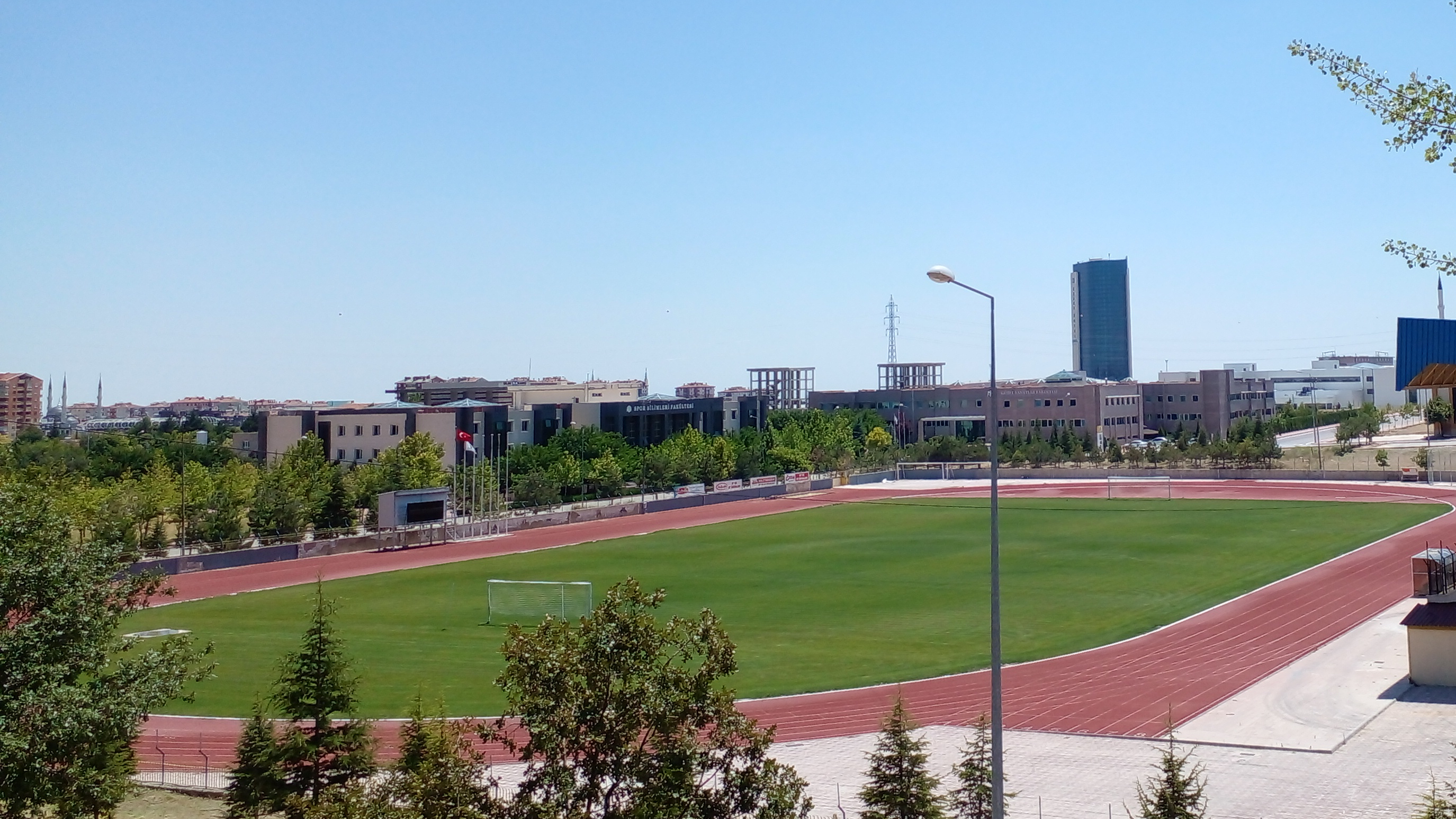
Football field and all-weather track.

=== Sports ===
The university has an Olympic-size swimming pool, a football field with roofed bleachers, 3 gymnasiums, 2 basketball courts, and 2 tennis courts.

=== Accommodation ===
The university's Alaaddin Keykubat campus hosts a six block Ataturk dormitory along with KYK-affiliated Alaaddin and Cumhuriyet student dormitories. The university also has a guesthouse and ERASMUS student dormitory.

== Organization ==
Selçuk University consists of 23 faculties, 1 State Conservatory, 22 vocational schools and Application Centers. Former faculties in Niğde, Karaman and Aksaray were separated from it in the 2000s.

Selçuk University has nearly 63,000 students and a population of approximately 2,700 academicians and lecturers. Of the student population, 2186 are international students from 105 countries.

=== Faculties ===
- Faculty of Agriculture
- Faculty of Art and Design
- Beyşehir Faculty of Business Administration
- Faculty of Communication
- Faculty of Dentistry
- Faculty of Economics and Administrative Sciences
- Faculty of Education
- Ereğli Faculty of Education
- Faculty of Engineering
- Faculty of Architecture
- Seydişehir Faculty of Engineering
- Faculty of Fine Arts
- Faculty of Law
- Meram Faculty of Medicine
- Selçuklu Faculty of Medicine
- Faculty of Science
- Faculty of Technical Education
- Faculty of Technology
- Faculty of Theology
- Faculty of Veterinary
- Faculty of Vocational Education

=== Schools ===
- School of Physical Education and Sports
- Akşehir Kadir Yallagöz School of Health
- School of Tourism and Hotel Management, which includes a practice hotel run by the Department of Tourism
- Beyşehir Ali Akkanat School of Tourism and Hotel Management
- School of Foreign Languages

=== Graduate schools ===
- Graduate school of Education Sciences
- Graduate school of Health Sciences
- Graduate school of Science
- Graduate school of Social Sciences
- Graduate school of Turkish Studies

=== President departments ===
- Department of Atatürk Principles and Revolution History
- Department of Turkish Language

=== Conservatories ===
- Dilek Sabanci State Conservatory

=== University hospitals ===
- Faculty of Medicine Hospital, a 934-bed teaching hospital
- Dental Hospital
- Veterinary Hospital

=== Research and application centers ===
- Accident Investigation, Prevention and Application Center
- Applied Mathematics Research and Application Center
- Atatürk Principles and Revolution History Research and Application Center
- Biofuels Research and Application Center
- Computer Sciences Research and Application Center
- Environmental Problems Research and Application Center
- ESWL and Stone Disease Research and Application Center
- Experimental Medicine Research and Application Center
- Family Research and Application Center
- Foreign Languages Research and Application Center
- Imam Maturidi Application and Research Center
- Konya History Research Center
- Manufacturing Systems Automation and Computer-Aided Design, Manufacturing, Research and Application Center
- Mevlana Research and Application Center
- Mushroom Research and Application Center
- Seljuks Research and Application Center
- Selcuk University Fisheries Research and Application Center
- Selcuk University Continuing Education Application and Research Center
- Research Center of Strategic Studies
- Turkish Craft Research and Application Center
- Turkish Folk Culture Research and Application Center

=== Additional units ===
- Selçuk University Computer Center (BİLMER)
- Selcuk University Department of Geological Engineering
- Selcuk University Central Library
- Selcuk University Technology Development Zone (Konya Teknokent)
- Continuing Education Application Center (SEM)

== Rectors ==
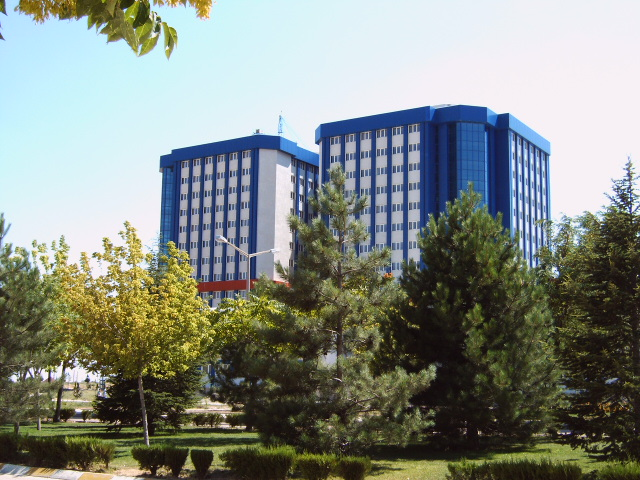
Faculty of medicine

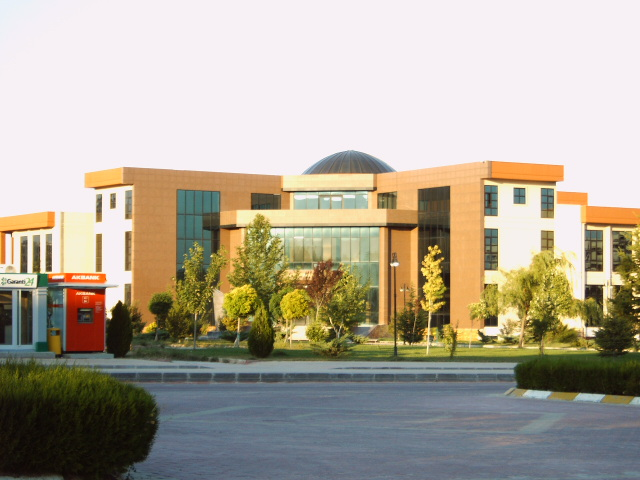
University library

Name	Years served
Prof.Dr. Ali Rıza Çetik (founding rector)	1975–1979
Prof.Dr. Neşet Çağatay	1979–1981
Prof.Dr. Mümün Köksoy	1981–1982
Prof.Dr. Erol Güngör	1982–1983
Prof.Dr. Süleyman Kadayıfçılar	1983–1984
Prof.Dr. Halil Cin	1984–1995
Prof.Dr. Abdurrahman Kutlu	1995–2003
Prof.Dr. Süleyman Okudan	2003-2011
Prof.Dr. Hakki Gokbel	2011–2016
Prof.Dr. Mustafa Şahin	2016–2020
Prof.Dr. Metin Aksoy	2020–2024
Prof.Dr. Hüseyin Yılmaz	2024-present

== Notable alumni ==
- Bekir Bozdağ, Minister of Justice
- Murat Kurum, Minister of Environment, Urbanisation and Climate Change
- İlhan Yerlikaya, former president of the Radio and Television Supreme Council
- Abdullah Koç, member of the Grand National Assembly of Turkey
- Mehmet Parsak, MP for Afyonkarahisar
- Özlem Çerçioğlu, mayor of Aydın
- Ismail Reisli, Associate Professor and Associate Chief Physician at Meram School of Medicine. Helped to identify CD19 Deficiency Syndrome.
- Metin Şahin, Assistant professor - European Taekwondo champion and current president of Turkey Taekwondo Federation
- Ahmet Kural, Actor
- Halil Mutlu, Physician at Baystate Medical Center, first cousin of President Recep Tayyip Erdoğan, and Chairman of AK Party USA

== See also ==
- Education in Turkey
- List of universities in Turkey
- Konya
- Student Selection and Placement System
