= Najla AlKanderi =

Kuwaiti television presenter

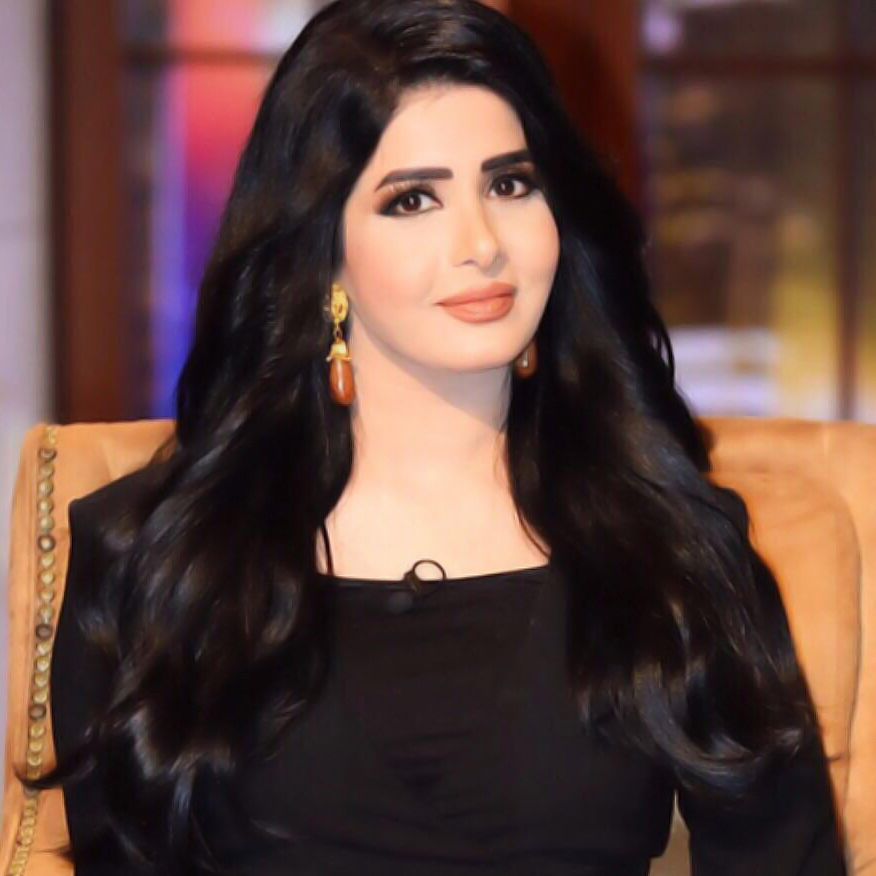
- Born: Najla Ibrahim AlKanderi; Kuwait city
- Occupations: Radio and Television presenter
- Television: Kuwait Television
- Website: www.najlaalkanderi.com

Najla Ibrahim AlKanderi (Arabic: نجلاء إبراهيم الكندري) is a Kuwaiti television presenter and Radio presenter. She is best known for hosting several late-night TV shows in Kuwait including Bel Kuwaiti on the AlMajles TV and Layali Al Kuwait on the Kuwait Television.

== Career ==
AlKanderi started her career by working as an English Translator for 12 years and the majority of this period was in the ministry of commerce and industry. In 2013, she made a career shift to work in media. At the beginning, she worked in OFM Radio Channel for one year. In 2014, she moved to work in the television Al Majles TV, which is the official channel for National Assembly of Kuwait. In 2018, she moved to work in the Ministry of Information in Kuwait where she joined the teamwork of Layali Al Kuwait TV show ( nights of Kuwait ) as a tv host to this daily evening program which is broadcast on the first channel of Kuwait television. She had worked also in the radio and participated in the preparation and presentation of the daily morning radio show (Ahla Sabah) which was broadcast on the channel 103.7.

=== As presenter ===
==== Selected radio shows ====
- Agmal ma qaraat
- Caffein
- Ahla Sabah

==== Selected TV shows ====
- Bel kuwaiti
- Al kuwait tantakheb
- Laylai al kuwait
- Bent Al Reeh
