= Najla Al-Sonboli =

Yemeni physician and academic

Najla Al-Sonboli is a pediatrician and the head of the Pediatric Department of Al-Sabeen Hospital for Maternity and Children in Sana'a. This hospital is the biggest tertiary referral pediatric hospital in Yemen and receives patients from Sana'a and surrounding areas, which includes people who are relocated due to war. She is a research partner at the Liverpool School of Tropical Medicine.

== Biography ==
Al-Sonboli received her Masters in Tropical Paediatrics in 1999, a diploma in Tropical Child Health in 2000, and her Ph.D. in pediatric health in 2006 from Liverpool School of Tropical Medicine in Liverpool, United Kingdom. Her areas of research include respiratory diseases, pulmonary tuberculosis, malnutrition, and diarrhea diseases in children.

In 2018, Al-Sonboli was given the World Health Assembly Heroine of Health Award for her contributions and improvement to global healthcare.

In the face of war Najla has shown resilience, working to provide medical care to save babies and children. Due to war, medical staff had no salaries, thus, Najla worked with no salary and under fire to help the people of her country through war. Children are dying from diseases, hunger, pieces of rocket and gunshots. Many have lost their parents in this war, many are displaced and separated from their families and their homeland.

== Publications ==
- Assessment of Immunization to Hepatitis B Vaccine Among Children Under Five Years in Rural Areas of Taiz, Yemen - Mar 2017
- Patients Direct Costs to Undergo TB Diagnosis - Mar 2016
- Barriers to Completing TB Diagnosis in Yemen: Services Should Response to Patients' Needs - Sept. 2014
- A Multi-Country Non-Inferiority Cluster Randomized Trial of Frontloaded Smear Microscopy for the Diagnosis of Pulmonary Tuberculosis - July 2011
- LED Fluorescence Microscopy for the Diagnosis of Pulmonary Tuberculosis: A Multi-Country Cross-Sectional Evaluation - July 2011
- Rotavirus and Norovirus Infections in Children in Sana'a, Yemen - Mar 2011
- Multiple Sampling in One Day to Optimize Smear Microscopy in Children with Tuberculosis in Yemen - Feb. 2009
- Human Metapneumovirus and Respiratory Syncytial Virus Disease in Children, Yemen - Sept. 2006
- Respiratory Syncytial Virus and Human Metapneumovirus in Children with Acute Respiratory Infections in Yemen - Sept. 2005

=== Full Citations for Published Works ===
- Fuad A. A. Alssamei et al., "Assessment of Immunization to Hepatitis B Vaccine among Children under Five Years in Rural Areas of Taiz, Yemen," ed. Man-Fung Yuen, Hepatitis Research and Treatment 2017 (March 6, 2017): 2131627, https://www.hindawi.com/journals/heprt/2017/2131627/.
- Rachel M. Anderson de Cuevas et al., "Patients Direct Costs to Undergo TB Diagnosis," Infectious Diseases of Poverty 5, no. 1 (March 24, 2016): 24, https://doi.org/10.1186/s40249-016-0117-x.
- Rachel M. Anderson de Cuevas et al., "Barriers to Completing TB Diagnosis in Yemen: Services Should Respond to Patients' Needs," ed. David W. Dowdy, PLoS ONE 9, no. 9 (September 22, 2014): e105194, https://doi.org/10.1371/journal.pone.0105194.
- Luis Eduardo Cuevas et al., "A Multi-Country Non-Inferiority Cluster Randomized Trial of Frontloaded Smear Microscopy for the Diagnosis of Pulmonary Tuberculosis," PLOS Medicine 8, no. 7 (July 12, 2011): e1000443, https://doi.org/10.1371/journal.pmed.1000443.
- Luis Eduardo Cuevas et al., "LED Fluorescence Microscopy for the Diagnosis of Pulmonary Tuberculosis: A Multi-Country Cross-Sectional Evaluation," ed. Douglas Wilson, PLoS Medicine 8, no. 7 (July 12, 2011): e1001057, https://doi.org/10.1371/journal.pmed.1001057.
- Andrew Kirby et al., "Rotavirus and Norovirus Infections in Children in Sana'a, Yemen," Tropical Medicine & International Health : TM & IH 16 (March 1, 2011): 680–84, https://doi.org/10.1111/j.1365-3156.2011.02756.x.
- Nasher Al-Aghbari et al., "Multiple Sampling in One Day to Optimize Smear Microscopy in Children with Tuberculosis in Yemen," PLoS ONE 4, no. 4 (April 9, 2009), https://doi.org/10.1371/journal.pone.0005140.
- Najla Al-Sonboli et al., "Human Metapneumovirus and Respiratory Syncytial Virus Disease in Children, Yemen - Volume 12, Number 9—September 2006 - Emerging Infectious Diseases - CDC," accessed November 7, 2020, https://doi.org/10.3201/eid1209.060207.

Najla Al-Sonboli et al., "Respiratory Syncytial Virus and Human Metapneumovirus in Children with Acute Respiratory Infections in Yemen," The Pediatric Infectious Disease Journal 24, no. 8 (August 2005): 734–36, https://doi.org/10.1097/01.inf.0000172937.80719.7f.

== Awards ==
- LSTM 2019 Honorary Degree Recipient.
- World Health Assembly Heroine of Health (2018).
