= Van Yüzüncü Yıl University =

Public university in Van, Turkey

Coordinates: 38.5698°N 43.2875°E

- Van Yüzüncü Yıl Üniversitesi
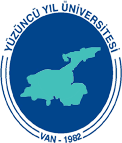
- Motto: Gateway to future
- Type: Public University
- Established: 1982
- Rector: Prof.Dr. Peyami BATTAL
- Administrative staff: 1500
- Students: 25,000 undergraduate, postgraduate and doctorate
- Location: Van, Turkey
- Campus: Urban, 30,000 decares
- Website: www.yyu.edu.tr

Van Yüzüncü Yıl University (Turkish: Van Yüzüncü Yıl Üniversitesi) is a university in Van, Turkey. The name was "Yüzüncü Yıl University" until June 15, 2017.

== History ==
Yüzüncü Yıl University was founded on July 20, 1982, by the Decree Law No 41. However, the attempts to create a university in the east region of Turkey had started much earlier. Atatürk, the president of republic of that period, sent Mustafa Necati, of The Ministry of Education, to examine on-site the situation in Van in 1927. Mustafa Necati found in favour of the foundation of a university in Van. Ferit Nur, the teacher, was sent to Van and was asked to transform the present middle school into a high school and to form the kernel of the planned university. Atatürk said, "We must go into action to constitute a modern city of culture with a primary school and finally a university in the most beautiful places on the coasts of The Lake Van for the east region" and with this aim, he sent Saffet Arıkan, The Ministry of Education of that period, to Van for land determination.

Atatürk said, " Developing the Istanbul University, completing the Ankara University and the founding the East University near the Lake Van within the principals determined with the investigations have been proceeding speedily and importantly." in the opening speech of BMM, on the first days of November in 1938. The committee of 15 people, including Prof. Dr. Afet İnan, was formed by The Ministry of Education on June 11, 1951 and attempted to determine the place of the East University. This committee approved the foundation of a university whose center would be Van and the constitution of some faculties and institutes in Elazığ, Erzurum and Diyarbakır as auxiliary departments of the East University. Meanwhile, the universities in Ankara and Istanbul were augmented and the new universities or the faculties, graduate schools and academies which would form the kernel of these universities had been opened. However, Van was not one of these happy provinces in this period.

On July 20, 1982, after almost 8 and a half months from introducing The Higher Education Law No 2447 which brought a new regulation for the universities, the decree law about The Organization of The Higher Education Institution was published. With this decree law, new universities were established. Yüzüncü Yıl University was also one of them. Local enterprises to found a university in Van were also available.” The Association of Founding and Sustentating of University and Graduate School in Van” was founded in 1968. This association had carried on the activity under the presidency of Tayyar Dabbağoğlu, Dr. Özçelik Okayer and Dr. Ertuğrul Yeginaltay. The association made an effort for establishing a faculty affiliated to Erzurum Atatürk University in Van and then transforming it into a separate university. With this aim, the committee established in 1981 went to Ankara and good news about the foundation of a university in Van was reported to the members of the association who were approved by Kenan Evren, the head of the state.

The university owes a debt of gratitude to everyone who contributes efforts such as making moral and material contribution to the foundation and the development of it, lecturing etc. With the 14 Faculties, 4 Institutes, 11 Graduate Schools and 19 Application and Research Centers, the university carries on the education activities in the campus which is established at the side of Lake Van and which is 15 km away from the city centre.

== Organization ==
Faculties

- Maritime Faculty
- Faculty of Dentistry
- Faculty of Letters
- Faculty of Pharmacy
- Faculty of Education
- Erciş Faculty of Management
- Faculty of Sciences
- Faculty of Fine Arts
- Faculty of Economics and Administrative Sciences
- Faculty of Divinity
- Faculty of Engineering and Architecture
- Faculty of Fisheries
- Faculty of Medicine
- Faculty of Veterinary Medicine
- Faculty of Agriculture

Institutes

- Institute of Education Sciences
- Institute of Health Sciences
- Institute of Living Languages
- Institute of Sciences
- Institute of Social Sciences

== See also ==
- List of Islamic educational institutions
