= Turkey at the 2011 Winter Universiade =

- IOC code: TUR
- Competitors: 158 in 11 sports
- Flag bearer: Sabahattin Oğlago
- Medals Ranked 23rd: Gold 0 Silver 1 Bronze 0 Total 1

Winter Universiade appearances (overview)
- 2007; 2009; 2011; 2013; 2015; 2017; 2019; 2023; 2025

Turkey competed at the 2011 Winter Universiade in Erzurum, Turkey.

== Competitors ==
Sport	Men	Women	Total
Alpine skiing			
Biathlon	8	4	12
Cross-country skiing	5	2	7
Curling	5	5	10
Figure skating	4	3	7
Freestyle skiing	4	1	5
Ice hockey	22	22	44
Nordic combined	1	0	1
Short track speed skating	4	6	10
Ski jumping	1	0	1
Snowboarding	3	4	7
Total			158

== Alpine skiing ==
=== Women ===
==== Super-G ====
Saturday, January 29, 11:00

Rank	Competitor	University	Time
46	Tuğba Daşdemir	Abant Izzet Baysal University	1:16.24
55	Zeynep Severge	Bilgi University	1:20.96
56	Fatmanur Gül	Hacettepe University	1:21.66
57	Betül Gül	Hacettepe University	1:21.67
60	İstem Tunca	Uludağ University	1:25.21
DNF	İrem Önder	Bilgi University

== Biathlon ==
=== Men ===
==== 20 km individual ====
Saturday, January 29, 10:00

Rank	Competitor	University	Time
32	Recep Efe	Gazi University	1:09:12.9
33	Ahmet Üstüntaş	Niğde University	1:09:39.0
35	Müjdat Boz	Kafkas University	1:10:58.7
37	Ayhan Arslan	Kafkas University	1:12:07.5
41	Samet Oğlago	Niğde University	1:13:45.9
42	Orhan Gazi Cıvıl	Gazi University	1:13:56.7

==== 10 km sprint ====
Tuesday, February 1, 10:00

Rank	Competitor	University	Time
28	Ahmet Üstüntaş	Niğde University	32:42.3
31	Orhan Gazi Cıvıl	Gazi University	33:28.0
33	Uğur Akman	Anadolu University	33:53.3
37	Müjdat Boz	Kafkas University	34:48.4
38	Recep Efe	Gazi University	34:49.1
42	Ekrem Yıldırım	Gazi University	36:25.5

==== 12.5 km pursuit ====
Wednesday, February 2, 10:00

Rank	Competitor	University	Time
27	Ahmet Üstüntaş	Niğde University	+10:00.4
28	Orhan Gazi Cıvıl	Gazi University	+10:10.8
	Uğur Akman	Anadolu University	LAP
	Ekrem Yıldırım	Gazi University	LAP
	Recep Efe	Gazi University	LAP
	Müjdat Boz	Kafkas University	LAP

==== 15 km mass start ====
Saturday, February 5, 10:00

Rank	Competitor	University	Time
24	Ahmet Üstüntaş	Niğde University	+5:25.0
29	Orhan Gazi Cıvıl	Gazi University	+7:46.1

=== Women ===
==== 15 km individual ====
Saturday, January 29, 13:00

Rank	Competitor	University	Time
34	Mehtap Baştuğ	Niğde University	1:05:42.6
36	Nihan Erdiler	Cumhuriyet University	1:07:26.9
38	Elif Aşkın	Van Yüzüncü Yıl Üniversitesi	1:10:34.9
30	Burcu Yeğin	Kastamonu University	1:11:06.0

==== 7.5 km sprint ====
Tuesday, February 1, 14:00

Rank	Competitor	University	Time
33	Nihan Erdiler	Cumhuriyet University	+7:20.8
37	Elif Aşkın	Van Yüzüncü Yıl Üniversitesi	+9:21.9
38	Mehtap Baştuğ	Niğde University	+10:02.1
39	Burcu Yeğin	Kastamonu University	+10:06.8

==== 10 km pursuit ====
Wednesday, February 2, 12:00

Rank	Competitor	University	Time
	Mehtap Baştuğ	Niğde University	DNS
	Nihan Erdiler	Cumhuriyet University	LAP
	Elif Aşkın	Van Yüzüncü Yıl Üniversitesi	LAP
	Burcu Yeğin	Kastamonu University	LAP

=== Mixed event ===
==== 2x6 km + 2x7.5 km relay ====
Fridayday, February 4, 10:00

Rank	Competitor	University	Time
9	Turkey		1:45:52.7

== Cross-country skiing ==
=== Men ===
==== 10 km classical ====
Friday, January 28, 12:00

Rank	Competitor	University	Time
5	Sabahattin Oğlago	Atatürk University	27:10.4
39	Ömer Yusufoğlu	Atatürk University	29:35.0
40	Süleyman Ateş	Kafkas University	29:44.8
41	Burhan Oğlago	Ağrı İbrahim Çeçen University	29:45.1
42	Erkan Orhan	Atatürk University	29:55.0

==== 15 km classical/free pursuit ====
Monday, January 31, 12:00

Rank	Competitor	University	Time
14	Sabahattin Oğlago	Atatürk University	46:08.6
30	Erkan Orhan	Atatürk University	47:51.8
31	Süleyman Ateş	Kafkas University	48:02.0
34	Burhan Oğlago	Ağrı İbrahim Çeçen University	48:15.7
37	Ömer Yusufoğlu	Atatürk University	48:46.3

==== 30 km free mass start ====
Saturday, February 5, 11:30

Rank	Competitor	University	Time
22	Ömer Yusufoğlu	Atatürk University	1:21:08.2
23	Sabahattin Oğlago	Atatürk University	1:21:44.0
27	Burhan Oğlago	Ağrı İbrahim Çeçen University	1:25:38.3
	Süleyman Ateş	Kafkas University	DNF

==== 4x10 km classical/free relay ====
Wednesday, February 2, 10:00

Rank	Competitor	University	Time
6	Sabahattin Oğlago	Atatürk University	25:48.9
6	Süleyman Ateş	Kafkas University	26:44.2
6	Erkan Orhan	Atatürk University	27:21.8
6	Burhan Oğlago	Ağrı İbrahim Çeçen University	27:31.0

==== 1.6 km free sprint ====
Saturday, January 29, 10:45

Rank	Competitor	University
26	Erkan Orhan	Atatürk University
36	Ömer Yusufoğlu	Atatürk University
39	Sabahattin Oğlago	Atatürk University
45	Burhan Oğlago	Ağrı İbrahim Çeçen University
49	Süleyman Ateş	Kafkas University

=== Women ===
==== 5 km classical ====
Friday, January 28, 10:00

Rank	Competitor	University	Time
47	Rojbin Ören	Atatürk University	18:54.7
54	Büşra Güneş	Gazi University	20:01.9

==== 10 km classical/free pursuit ====
Monday, January 31, 10:00

Rank	Competitor	University	Time
43	Rojbin Ören	Atatürk University	41:49.2

==== 15 km free mass start ====
Saturday, February 5, 10:00

Rank	Competitor	University	Time
28	Büşra Güneş	Gazi University	54:31.6

==== 1.3 km free sprint ====
Saturday, January 29, 12:30

Rank	Competitor	University	Time
43	Büşra Güneş	Gazi University
44	Rojbin Ören	Atatürk University

=== Mixed event ===
==== 6x1.3 km free sprint ====
Thursday, February 3, 10:00

Rank	Team	Competitor	University	Time
22	Turkey II	Erkan Orhan; Büşra Güneş	Atatürk University; Gazi University	+2:47.0 +3:48.4
23	Turkey I	Ömer Yusufoğlu; Rojbin Ören	Atatürk University; Atatürk University	+2:51.9 +3:59.7

== Curling ==
Turkey will be represented by a men's and a women's curling team.

=== Men ===
Pos.	Player	University
Skip	Oğuzhan Dikmen	Atatürk University
Third	Çağrı Bayraktar	Anadolu University
Second	Yusuf Ziya Bayraktutan	Atatürk University
Lead	Oğuz Zengin	Atatürk University
Alternate	Haluk Adanır	Atatürk University

==== Standings ====
Country	W	L
South Korea	7	2
Great Britain	7	2
Switzerland	7	2
Czech Republic	7	3
Canada	6	4
Norway	4	5
United States	4	5
Sweden	3	6
Turkey	1	8
Slovenia	0	9

==== Round-robin results ====
Draw 1

Friday, January 28, 14:00

Sheet E	1	2	3	4	5	6	7	8	9	10	Final
Czech Republic 🔨	0	4	0	2	1	0	2	X	X	X	9
Turkey	0	0	1	0	0	1	0	X	X	X	2

Draw 2

Saturday, January 29, 9:00

Sheet B	1	2	3	4	5	6	7	8	9	10	Final
Sweden 🔨	3	2	1	0	2	0	1	1	X	X	10
Turkey	0	0	0	1	0	1	0	0	X	X	2

Draw 3

Saturday, January 29, 19:00

Sheet A	1	2	3	4	5	6	7	8	9	10	Final
Switzerland 🔨	0	1	0	3	2	1	0	1	X	X	8
Turkey	0	0	1	0	0	0	1	0	X	X	2

Draw 4

Sunday, January 30, 14:00

Sheet C	1	2	3	4	5	6	7	8	9	10	Final
Great Britain 🔨	2	0	1	2	1	0	3	X	X	X	9
Turkey	0	1	0	0	0	1	0	X	X	X	2

Draw 5

Monday, January 31, 9:00

Sheet E	1	2	3	4	5	6	7	8	9	10	Final
Turkey	0	1	0	0	0	0	1	0	1	X	3
South Korea 🔨	1	0	1	2	1	0	0	2	0	X	7

Draw 6

Monday, January 31, 19:00

Sheet A	1	2	3	4	5	6	7	8	9	10	Final
Turkey	0	1	1	0	2	0	1	0	0	X	5
United States 🔨	2	0	0	3	0	3	0	0	1	X	9

Draw 7

Tuesday, February 1, 14:00

Sheet B	1	2	3	4	5	6	7	8	9	10	Final
Turkey	0	1	0	0	1	0	1	X	X	X	3
Norway 🔨	2	0	2	1	0	2	0	X	X	X	7

Draw 8

Wednesday, February 2, 9:00

Sheet C	1	2	3	4	5	6	7	8	9	10	Final
Turkey 🔨	4	0	2	1	0	0	0	2	X	X	9
Slovenia	0	1	0	0	0	1	1	0	X	X	3

Draw 9

Wednesday, February 2, 19:00

Sheet D	1	2	3	4	5	6	7	8	9	10	Final
Turkey 🔨	0	1	0	0	0	0	1	X	X	X	2
Canada	1	0	2	1	3	0	0	X	X	X	7

=== Women ===
Pos.	Player	University
Skip	Öznur Polat	Atatürk University
Third	Elif Kızılkaya	Atatürk University
Second	Şeyda Zengin	Atatürk University
Lead	Burcu Pehlivan	Kocaeli University
Alternate	Ayşe Gözütok	Atatürk University

==== Standings ====
Country	W	L
Great Britain	8	1
Russia	7	2
South Korea	6	3
Japan	6	3
China	5	4
Canada	4	5
Czech Republic	4	5
Germany	3	6
Poland	2	7
Turkey	0	9

==== Round-robin results ====
Draw 1

Friday, January 28, 9:00

Sheet C	1	2	3	4	5	6	7	8	9	10	Final
Turkey	0	1	0	3	1	0	0	1	0	X	3
Poland 🔨	2	0	0	3	2	0	0	0	1	X	8

Draw 2

Friday, January 28, 19:00 Saturday, January 29, 9:00

Sheet D	1	2	3	4	5	6	7	8	9	10	Final
Turkey	0	0	0	0	1	0	0	X	X	X	1
Czech Republic	2	0	2	3	0	2	0	X	X	X	9

Draw 3

Saturday, January 29, 14:00

Sheet E	1	2	3	4	5	6	7	8	9	10	Final
Turkey 🔨	0	0	0	0	0	0	1	0	X	X	1
China	2	2	3	1	1	1	0	3	X	X	13

Draw 4

Sunday, January 30, 9:00

Sheet B	1	2	3	4	5	6	7	8	9	10	Final
Turkey	0	1	0	1	0	0	1	0	X	X	3
Great Britain 🔨	0	0	4	0	5	1	0	0	X	X	10

Draw 5

Sunday, January 30, 19:00

Sheet A	1	2	3	4	5	6	7	8	9	10	Final
Turkey	0	0	1	0	1	0	1	0	X	X	3
Russia 🔨	2	2	0	6	0	2	0	2	X	X	14

Draw 6

Monday, January 31, 14:00

Sheet D	1	2	3	4	5	6	7	8	9	10	Final
Germany	0	1	0	0	1	0	4	0	0	2	8
Turkey 🔨	0	0	2	2	0	1	0	1	1	0	7

Draw 7

Tuesday, February 1, 9:00

Sheet E	1	2	3	4	5	6	7	8	9	10	Final
Japan 🔨	2	0	4	0	2	0	3	1	X	X	12
Turkey	0	1	0	1	0	2	0	0	X	X	4

Draw 8

Tuesday, February 1, 19:00

Sheet C	1	2	3	4	5	6	7	8	9	10	Final
South Korea	1	0	3	1	0	2	1	0	3	X	11
Turkey	0	1	0	0	1	0	0	1	0	X	3

Draw 9

Wednesday, February 2, 14:00

Sheet A	1	2	3	4	5	6	7	8	9	10	Final
Canada 🔨	2	1	2	0	4	0	X	X	X	X	9
Turkey	0	0	0	2	0	1	X	X	X	x	3

== Figure skating ==
=== Men's singles ===
Wednesday, February 2, 15:00

Rank	Competitor	University	Points
18	Kutay Eryoldaş	Ankara University	136.83
21	Engin Ali Artan	Dokuz Eylül University	125.97
23	Ali Demirboğa	Kocaeli University	123.69

=== Ladies' singles ===
Monday, January 31, 18:55

Rank	Competitor	University	Points
25	Renk Kemaloğlu	Bilgi University	79.76
29	Beril Bektaş	Anadolu University	64.50

=== Synchronized skating ===
Friday, February 4, 19:50

Rank	Competitor	University	Points
4	Turkey	Ankara University	61.07

== Freestyle skiing ==
=== Men ===
==== Moguls ====
Friday, January 28, 11:30

Rank	Competitor	University
DNS	Yakup Önal	Atatürk University
DNS	Barkın Beceren	Bilgi University
DNS	Mustafa Gedik	Kafkas University
DNS	Kaan Oral	Atatürk University

==== Ski cross ====
Saturday, February 5, 11:30

Rank	Competitor	University	Score
32	Yakup Önal	Atatürk University	51.76
33	Barkın Beceren	Bilgi University	52.69
34	Mustafa Gedik	Kafkas University	52.81

=== Women ===
==== Moguls ====
Friday, January 28, 11:30

Rank	Competitor	University
DNS	Zeynep Severge	Bilgi University

==== Ski cross ====
Saturday, February 5, 12:44

Rank	Competitor	University	Score
4	Zeynep Severge	Bilgi University	51.76

== Ice hockey ==
Turkey will be represented by a men's and women's team.

=== Men ===
The men's hockey team competed in Group A. It finished the round robin as the latest conceding 60 goals without scoring a goal at all. The team finally placed twelfth after playing two more matches. The only goals for Turkey's team in the Games came in the play-offs from Emre Elevli against Slovenia and from Kemal Burkay Altuntaş against South Korea.

==== Team roster ====
- Head coach: (Turkey) Tarık Göçmen

Pos.	No.	Player	University
GK	3	Eray Atalı	Kocaeli University
GK	20	Erol Kahraman	Eastern Mediterranean University
D	2	Doğa Selçuk	Kocaeli University
D	5	Orhan Coşkun	Police Academy
D	9	Gökhun Öztürk	Kocaeli University
D	11	Gürkan Çetinkaya	Kocaeli University
D	13	Kerem Tuna İslam	Koç University
D	16	Savaş Can Burak Aktürk	Kocaeli University
D	24	Sefa Berat Aktepe	Police Academy
F	4	Özgür Karahan	Kocaeli University
F	6	Buğra Albayrak	University of British Columbia
F	7	Fevzi Ufuk Güçlü	Kocaeli University
F	8	Batın Kösemen	Kocaeli University
F	10	Tuğcan Akyıldız	Kocaeli University
F	14	Emrah Özmen	Anadolu University
F	15	Kemal Burkay Altuntaş	Ankara University
F	17	Emre Elevli	Saint Paul University
F	18	İbrahim Kaan Özgencil	Middle East Technical University
F	19	Mevlut Kumcu	Police Academy
F	21	Alper Solak	Ankara University
F	22	Egemen Taşboğa	Gazi University
F	23	Niyazi Çağrı Karabulut	Anadolu University

==== Group A – round-robin results ====
Team	GP	W	OTW	OTL	L	GF	GA	DIF	PTS
Russia	3	3	0	0	0	34	3	+31	9
Japan	3	1	1	0	1	21	4	+17	5
Czech Republic	3	1	0	1	1	18	7	+11	4
Turkey	3	0	0	0	3	0	60	−60	0

January 27, 2011; 9:30	Czech Republic	16–0	Turkey	3000 Ice Rink, Erzurum

Game reference
Referees: (Canada) Mike Pearce (Canada) Andrew Hubbard, (Canada) Benoit Martineau

January 29, 2011; 16:00	Japan	18–0 (4-0, 5-0, 9-0)	Turkey	3000 Ice Rink, Erzurum

Game reference

January 31, 2011; 16:00	Turkey	0–26 (0-10, 0-10, 0-6)	Russia	3000 Ice Rink, Erzurum

Game reference

==== 9th–12th placement matches ====
February 3, 2011; 11:00	Slovenia	11–1 (5-1, 2-0, 4-0)	Turkey	500 Ice Rink, Erzurum

Game reference

==== 11th-place match ====
February 4, 2011; 11:00	South Korea	4–1 (2-0, 0-0, 2-1)	Turkey	500 Ice Rink, Erzurum

Game reference

=== Women ===
==== Team roster ====
- Head coach: (United States) Keith McAdams

Pos.	No.	Player	University
GK	1	Mine Güngör	American Public University
GK	25	Berfu Merve Bolulu	Bilgi University
D	8	Sinem Yalçındağ	Aksaray University
D	15	Refika Yılmaz	Hacettepe University
D	19	Elif Bayrak	Bilkent University
D	21	Feriha Ceren Alkan	Middle East Technical University
D	23	Özlem Yerebakan	Ankara University
D	24	Zeynep Özen Pervan	American Public University
F	4	Didem Aydoğdu	Kocaeli University
F	5	Özlem Öz	Middle East Technical University
F	6	Çağla Baktıroğlu	University of Windsor
F	7	Mefharet Veziroğlu	Hacettepe University
F	9	Huriye Yeliz Yüksel	Anadolu University/Open Education
F	10	Sinem Doğu	Hacettepe University
F	11	Dilara Elysse Özen	Bucks County Community College
F	12	Çağla Sevgili	Kocaeli University
F	13	Tuba Ilgın	Anadolu University/Open Education
F	14	Nilay Günay	Bilkent University
F	16	Başak Biçer	Middle East Technical University
F	17	Tuba Dokur	Kocaeli University/Hereke MYO
F	18	Teksin Öztekin	Bilkent University
F	22	Gamze Elif Ulaş	Anadolu University/Open Education

==== Round-robin results ====
Team	GP	W	OTW	OTL	L	GF	GA	DIF	PTS
Canada	4	3	1	0	0	28	1	+27	11
Finland	4	3	0	1	0	42	3	+39	10
Slovakia	4	3	0	0	1	33	4	+29	9
United States	4	1	0	0	3	17	17	0	3
(United Kingdom) Great Britain	4	1	0	0	3	10	28	-18	3
Turkey	4	0	0	0	4	0	77	-77	0

January 27, 2011; 12:45	Great Britain	10–0	Turkey	500 Ice Rink, Erzurum

Game reference
Referees: (Slovakia) Zuzanna Findorova (Slovakia) Magdalena Cerhitova, (United States) Susan Collins

January 28, 2011; 11:00	United States	15–0 (8–0, 5–0, 2-0)	Turkey	500 Ice Rink, Erzurum; Attendance: 150

Game reference
Referees: (Slovakia) Zuzanna Findorova (Slovakia) Michaela Kudelova, (Sweden) Karolin Strom

January 30, 2011; 19:00	Turkey	0–20 (0-9, 0-6, 0-5)	Slovakia	500 Ice Rink, Erzurum

Game reference

January 31, 2011; 19:00	Finland	32–0 (7-0, 17-0, 8-0)	Turkey	500 Ice Rink, Erzurum

Game reference

February 2, 2011; 20:00	Turkey	0–11 (0-4, 0-4, 0-3)	Canada	3000 Ice Rink, Erzurum

Game reference

== Nordic combined ==
=== Men ===
==== Individual Gundersen ====
Cross country 10 km

Friday, January 28, 10:00

Competitor	Rank	Time
Mustafa Öztaşyonar	28	40:57.1

K95 Jump

Saturday, January 29, 10:00

Competitor	Rank	Score
Mustafa Öztaşyonar	30	58.6

==== Mass start ====
Cross country 10 km

Sunday, January 30, 09:30

Competitor	Rank	Time
Mustafa Öztaşyonar	27	44:05.0

K95 Jump

Sunday, January 30, 15:45

Competitor	Rank	Score
Mustafa Öztaşyonar	26	19.0

== Short track speed skating ==
=== Men ===
==== 500 m ====
Saturday, January 29, 14:48

Rank	Competitor	University	Time
34	Selim Tanrıkulu	Vrije Universiteit Brussel
39	Mükerrem Top	Atatürk University
44	Özgür Yeşilöz	Hacettepe University
46	Önder Aslan	Atatürk University

==== 1000 m ====
Sunday, January 30, 16:15

Rank	Competitor	University	Time
29	Selim Tanrıkulu	Vrije Universiteit Brussel
33	Mükerrem Top	Atatürk University
38	Önder Aslan	Atatürk University
42	Özgür Yeşilöz	Hacettepe University

==== 1500 m ====
Friday, January 28, 14:50

Rank	Competitor	University	Time
31	Selim Tanrıkulu	Vrije Universiteit Brussel
36	Mükerrem Top	Atatürk University
38	Önder Aslan	Atatürk University
39	Özgür Yeşilöz	Hacettepe University

=== Women ===
==== 500 m ====
Saturday, January 29, 14:00

Rank	Competitor	University	Time
32	Zeynep Erkılıç	Atatürk University
37	Leyla Yılmaz	Atatürk University
38	Gamze Altıntaş	Kocaeli University
39	Duygu Kan	Kastamonu University

==== 1000 m ====
Sunday, January 30, 14:00

Rank	Competitor	University	Time
35	Leyla Yılmaz	Atatürk University
37	Duygu Kan	Kastamonu University
38	Zeynep Erkılıç	Atatürk University
39	Ela Kara	Atatürk University

==== 1500 m ====
Friday, January 28, 14:00

Rank	Competitor	University	Time
36	Leyla Yılmaz	Atatürk University
37	Duygu Kan	Kastamonu University
39	Sezen Saraç	Kocaeli University
40	Ela Kara	Atatürk University

== Ski jumping ==
=== Men ===
==== Normal hill individual ====
Saturday, January 29, 18:00

Rank	Competitor	University	Score
25	Faik Yüksel	Kastamonu University	176.4

==== Large hill individual ====
Monday, January 31, 19:30

Rank	Competitor	University	Score
24	Faik Yüksel	Kastamonu University	179.6

== Snowboarding ==
=== Men ===
==== SBX ====
Saturday, January 29, 11:00

Rank	Competitor	University	Time
	Mehmet Ali Ünal	Sabancı University
	Can Polatkan	Bilgi University
	Ümit Deniz Altınok	Marmara University

=== Women ===
==== SBX ====
Saturday, January 29, 14:45

Rank	Competitor	University	Time
	Sevda Sayar	Anadolu University
	Nesligül Kocak	Bilgi University
	İdil Pınar Halefoğlu	Galatasaray University
	Melis Firuzan Başatır	Anadolu University
