= Curling at the 2011 Winter Universiade =

2011 Winter Universiade
- Host city: Erzurum, Turkey
- Arena: Milli Piyango Curling Arena
- Dates: January 27 – February 6
- Men's winner: South Korea
- Skip: Kim Chang-min
- Third: Kim Min-chan
- Second: Seong Se-hyeon
- Lead: Seo Young-seon
- Alternate: Oh Eun-Su
- Finalist: Switzerland (Pascal Hess)
- Women's winner: Great Britain
- Skip: Anna Sloan
- Third: Lauren Gray
- Second: Vicki Adams
- Lead: Sarah Macintyre
- Alternate: Claire Hamilton
- Finalist: Russia (Anna Sidorova)

Curling at the 2011 Winter Universiade took place at the Milli Piyango Curling Arena from January 27 to February 6. Ten men's and women's teams were qualified to compete in the Universiade based on their performance at the previous competition and at the 2009 and 2010 World Junior Curling Championships and the 2009 and 2010 Men's and Women's Curling Championships. They competed in a round-robin format, and the top four teams advanced to a single knockout round to determine the final placements.

South Korea won the gold-medal match over Switzerland in 9 ends, while Great Britain won a close match over Russia in an extra end.

== Qualification ==
=== Men ===
Men's Qualification for the 2011 Winter Universiade
No.	Country	2009 Winter Universiade	2007 WJCC	2007 WMCC	2008 WJCC	2008 WMCC	Points
1	Norway	24	6	10	6	12	58
2	Canada	10	12	12	10	14	58
3	Switzerland	12	5	9	14	7	47
4	Sweden	28	8	-	5	5	46
5	Great Britain	8	2	14	12	10	46
6	China	20	3	4	8	2	37
7	United States	6	10	8	2	9	35
8	Denmark	-	14	6	3	8	31
9	South Korea	16	-	-	-	-	16
10	Germany	-	1	7	-	6	14
11	Finland	4	-	1	4	-	9
12	France	-	-	5	-	4	9
13	Japan	2	-	3	-	1	6
14	Russia	-	4	-	1	-	5
15	Italy	-	-	-	-	3	3
16	Czech Republic	-	-	2	-	-	2
-	Slovenia	-	-	-	-	-	0
-	Turkey (host)	-	-	-	-	-	0

- China withdrew and were replaced with Poland.

=== Women ===
Women's Qualification for the 2011 Winter Universiade
No.	Country	2009 Winter Universiade	2007 WJCC	2007 WWCC	2008 WJCC	2008 WWCC	Points
1	Canada	24	12	9	12	10	67
2	China	28	-	14	4	6	52
3	Sweden	10	5	12	14	9	50
4	Great Britain	16	14	5	1	12	48
5	Russia	20	8	6	6	5	45
6	United States	4	6	4	10	8	32
7	Switzerland	-	10	8	8	3	29
8	Germany	-	-	7	2	14	23
9	Denmark	-	3	10	-	7	20
10	Czech Republic	12	4	-	3	-	19
11	South Korea	8	-	3	-	-	11
12	Japan	6	1	-	-	2	9
13	France	-	2	-	5	-	7
14	Norway	-	-	2	-	4	6
15	Poland	2	-	-	-	-	2
16	Italy	-	-	1	-	-	1
17	Latvia	-	-	-	-	1	1
-	Turkey (host)	-	-	-	-	-	0

- USA withdrew and were replaced with Poland.

== Men ==
=== Teams ===
Canada	Czech Republic	Great Britain	South Korea	Norway
Skip: Jonathan Beuk Third: Andrew Inouye; Second: Chadd Vandermade; Lead: Scott Chadwick; Alternate: Bill Francis	Skip: Lukáš Klíma Third: Jiří Candra; Second: Tomáš Paul; Lead: David Jirounek; Alternate: Kryštof Chaloupek	Skip: Glen Muirhead Third: Alasdair Guthrie; Second: Greg Drummond; Lead: Kerr Drummond; Alternate: Michael Goodfellow	Skip: Kim Chang-min Third: Kim Min-chan; Second: Seong Se-hyeon; Lead: Seo Young-seon; Alternate: Oh Eun-su	Skip: Markus Høiberg Third: Steffen Walstad; Second: Frode Bjerke; Lead: Hans Roger Tommervold
Slovenia	Sweden	Switzerland	Turkey	United States
Skip: Jošt Lajovec Third: Gašper Uršič; Second: Jure Čulić; Lead: Tomas Tišler; Alternate: Matevž Kovač	Skip: Christoffer Sundgren Third: Alexander Nordgren; Second: Axel Rosander; Lead: Johan Spiik; Alternate: Axel Österlund	Skip: Pascal Hess Third: Stefan Meienberg; Second: Jean-Francois Mayoraz; Lead: Bastian Brun; Alternate: Florian Meister	Skip: Oğuzhan Dikmen Third: Çağrı Bayraktar; Second: Oğuz Zengin; Lead: Yusuf Ziya Bayraktutan; Alternate: Haluk Adanır	Skip: Blake Morton Third: Marcus Fonger; Second: Tommy Juszczyk; Lead: Calvin Weber; Alternate: Tom Gabower

=== Standings ===
Country	W	L
South Korea	7	2
Great Britain	7	2
Switzerland	7	2
Czech Republic	6	3
Canada	6	3
Norway	4	5
United States	4	5
Sweden	3	6
Turkey	1	8
Slovenia	0	9

=== Results ===
==== Draw 1 ====
Friday, January 28, 14:00

Sheet A	1	2	3	4	5	6	7	8	9	10	Final
South Korea (Kim)	0	1	0	0	3	2	0	0	1	X	7
Norway (Hoiberg) 🔨	1	0	3	0	0	0	0	1	0	X	5

Sheet B	1	2	3	4	5	6	7	8	9	10	Final
Great Britain (Muirhead)	0	1	0	0	0	0	1	0	2	0	4
Canada (Beuk) 🔨	1	0	0	3	0	1	0	1	0	1	7

Sheet C	1	2	3	4	5	6	7	8	9	10	Final
Slovenia (Lajovec)	0	0	0	0	0	0	X	X	X	X	1
Sweden (Sundgren) 🔨	1	2	2	3	2	2	X	X	X	X	12

Sheet D	1	2	3	4	5	6	7	8	9	10	Final
United States (Morton)	0	1	0	1	0	3	0	1	0	X	6
Switzerland (Hess) 🔨	2	0	2	0	1	0	3	0	4	X	12

Sheet E	1	2	3	4	5	6	7	8	9	10	Final
Czech Republic (Klima) 🔨	0	4	0	2	1	0	2	X	X	X	9
Turkey (Dikmen)	0	0	1	0	0	1	0	X	X	X	2

==== Draw 2 ====
Saturday, January 29, 9:00

Sheet A	1	2	3	4	5	6	7	8	9	10	Final
Czech Republic (Klima)	0	2	0	0	1	1	0	1	0	0	5
Great Britain (Muirhead) 🔨	0	0	2	2	0	0	1	0	0	1	6

Sheet B	1	2	3	4	5	6	7	8	9	10	Final
Sweden (Sundgren) 🔨	3	2	1	0	2	0	1	1	X	X	10
Turkey (Dikmen)	0	0	0	1	0	1	0	0	X	X	2

Sheet C	1	2	3	4	5	6	7	8	9	10	Final
South Korea (Kim) 🔨	2	3	0	0	2	0	4	X	X	X	11
United States (Morton)	0	0	1	0	0	1	0	X	X	X	2

Sheet D	1	2	3	4	5	6	7	8	9	10	Final
Slovenia (Lajovec)	0	0	1	0	1	0	X	X	X	X	2
Norway (Hoiberg) 🔨	5	2	0	3	0	4	X	X	X	X	14

Sheet E	1	2	3	4	5	6	7	8	9	10	Final
Canada (Beuk) 🔨	0	0	1	0	0	2	0	3	0	0	6
Switzerland (Hess)	1	0	0	1	0	0	3	0	1	1	7

==== Draw 3 ====
Saturday, January 29, 19:00

Sheet A	1	2	3	4	5	6	7	8	9	10	Final
Switzerland (Hess) 🔨	0	1	0	3	2	1	0	1	X	X	8
Turkey (Dikmen)	0	0	1	0	0	0	1	0	X	X	2

Sheet B	1	2	3	4	5	6	7	8	9	10	Final
Norway (Hoiberg) 🔨	0	0	1	0	0	2	0	2	0	0	5
United States (Morton)	0	1	0	1	0	0	2	0	1	1	6

Sheet C	1	2	3	4	5	6	7	8	9	10	Final
Canada (Beuk)	0	0	0	2	0	0	2	0	0	X	4
Czech Republic (Klima) 🔨	0	1	0	0	2	0	0	2	2	X	7

Sheet D	1	2	3	4	5	6	7	8	9	10	Final
Sweden (Sundgren)	0	0	1	1	0	2	0	0	0	0	4
South Korea (Kim) 🔨	0	2	0	0	1	0	2	1	1	2	9

Sheet E	1	2	3	4	5	6	7	8	9	10	Final
Slovenia (Lajovec)	0	2	0	1	0	0	0	0	X	X	3
Great Britain (Muirhead) 🔨	5	0	1	0	1	1	1	1	X	X	10

==== Draw 4 ====
Sunday, January 30, 14:00

Sheet A	1	2	3	4	5	6	7	8	9	10	Final
Norway (Hoiberg)	0	0	0	0	2	0	0	X	X	X	2
Canada (Beuk) 🔨	0	2	4	1	0	1	1	X	X	X	9

Sheet B	1	2	3	4	5	6	7	8	9	10	Final
Slovenia (Lajovec)	0	0	0	0	1	0	X	X	X	X	1
South Korea (Kim) 🔨	3	2	5	1	0	5	X	X	X	X	16

Sheet C	1	2	3	4	5	6	7	8	9	10	Final
Great Britain (Muirhead) 🔨	2	0	1	2	1	0	3	X	X	X	9
Turkey (Dikmen)	0	1	0	0	0	1	0	X	X	X	2

Sheet D	1	2	3	4	5	6	7	8	9	10	Final
Switzerland (Hess)	0	0	0	1	0	0	0	1	0	X	2
Czech Republic (Klima) 🔨	2	0	1	0	0	2	0	0	2	X	7

Sheet E	1	2	3	4	5	6	7	8	9	10	Final
United States (Morton) 🔨	1	2	2	3	1	0	X	X	X	X	9
Sweden (Sundgren)	0	0	0	0	0	1	X	X	X	X	1

==== Draw 5 ====
Monday, January 31, 9:00

Sheet A	1	2	3	4	5	6	7	8	9	10	Final
Slovenia (Lajovec) 🔨	1	0	0	0	0	1	0	X	X	X	2
Czech Republic (Klima)	0	2	1	0	2	0	5	X	X	X	10

Sheet B	1	2	3	4	5	6	7	8	9	10	Final
Canada (Beuk) 🔨	1	0	1	0	0	1	0	1	0	X	4
Sweden (Sundgren)	0	1	0	1	2	0	3	0	1	X	8

Sheet C	1	2	3	4	5	6	7	8	9	10	Final
Norway (Hoiberg)	1	0	0	1	0	0	0	0	X	X	2
Switzerland (Hess) 🔨	0	0	3	0	1	1	1	3	X	X	9

Sheet D	1	2	3	4	5	6	7	8	9	10	Final
Great Britain (Muirhead) 🔨	3	0	0	1	0	4	X	X	X	X	8
United States (Morton)	0	0	1	0	1	0	X	X	X	X	2

Sheet E	1	2	3	4	5	6	7	8	9	10	Final
Turkey (Dikmen)	0	1	0	0	0	0	1	0	1	X	3
South Korea (Kim) 🔨	1	0	1	2	1	0	0	2	0	X	7

==== Draw 6 ====
Monday, January 31, 19:00

Sheet A	1	2	3	4	5	6	7	8	9	10	Final
Turkey (Dikmen)	0	1	1	0	2	0	1	0	0	X	5
United States (Morton) 🔨	2	0	0	3	0	3	0	0	1	X	9

Sheet B	1	2	3	4	5	6	7	8	9	10	Final
South Korea (Kim) 🔨	1	1	0	3	0	2	0	1	0	2	10
Switzerland (Hess)	0	0	1	0	3	0	1	0	2	0	7

Sheet C	1	2	3	4	5	6	7	8	9	10	Final
Sweden (Sundgren)	0	0	1	1	0	1	0	X	X	X	3
Great Britain (Muirhead) 🔨	1	3	0	0	1	0	3	X	X	X	8

Sheet D	1	2	3	4	5	6	7	8	9	10	Final
Canada (Beuk) 🔨	3	0	4	4	1	1	X	X	X	X	13
Slovenia (Lajovec)	0	1	0	0	0	0	X	X	X	X	1

Sheet E	1	2	3	4	5	6	7	8	9	10	Final
Norway (Hoiberg) 🔨	0	0	1	0	0	3	0	0	0	1	5
Czech Republic (Klima)	0	0	0	0	1	0	3	0	0	0	4

==== Draw 7 ====
Tuesday, February 1, 14:00

Sheet A	1	2	3	4	5	6	7	8	9	10	11	Final
Great Britain (Muirhead)	0	0	2	0	4	0	0	0	0	2	2	10
South Korea (Kim) 🔨	0	1	0	2	0	1	1	1	2	0	0	8

Sheet B	1	2	3	4	5	6	7	8	9	10	Final
Turkey (Dikmen)	0	1	0	0	1	0	1	X	X	X	3
Norway (Hoiberg) 🔨	2	0	2	1	0	2	0	X	X	X	7

Sheet C	1	2	3	4	5	6	7	8	9	10	Final
United States (Morton)	0	0	1	0	1	0	0	2	0	1	5
Canada (Beuk) 🔨	0	2	0	2	0	0	2	0	0	0	6

Sheet D	1	2	3	4	5	6	7	8	9	10	Final
Czech Republic (Klima) 🔨	2	0	0	0	2	0	3	X	X	X	7
Sweden (Sundgren)	0	0	1	0	0	1	0	X	X	X	2

Sheet E	1	2	3	4	5	6	7	8	9	10	Final
Switzerland (Hess) 🔨	3	4	0	4	0	2	X	X	X	X	13
Slovenia (Lajovec)	0	0	1	0	1	0	X	X	X	X	2

==== Draw 8 ====
Wednesday, February 2, 9:00

Sheet A	1	2	3	4	5	6	7	8	9	10	Final
Sweden (Sundgren)	0	1	0	0	1	0	2	0	0	X	4
Switzerland (Hess) 🔨	1	0	0	2	0	1	0	0	3	X	7

Sheet B	1	2	3	4	5	6	7	8	9	10	Final
United States (Morton)	0	0	0	0	1	0	2	0	0	1	4
Czech Republic (Klima) 🔨	0	1	0	3	0	0	0	1	0	0	5

Sheet C	1	2	3	4	5	6	7	8	9	10	Final
Turkey (Dikmen) 🔨	4	0	2	1	0	0	0	2	X	X	9
Slovenia (Lajovec)	0	1	0	0	0	1	1	0	X	X	3

Sheet D	1	2	3	4	5	6	7	8	9	10	Final
Norway (Hoiberg) 🔨	0	1	0	0	1	1	0	0	1	X	4
Great Britain (Muirhead)	0	0	0	3	0	0	2	1	0	X	6

Sheet E	1	2	3	4	5	6	7	8	9	10	Final
South Korea (Kim) 🔨	0	0	0	0	2	0	2	0	0	X	4
Canada (Beuk)	0	2	0	1	0	1	0	1	1	X	6

==== Draw 9 ====
Wednesday, February 2, 19:00

Sheet A	1	2	3	4	5	6	7	8	9	10	Final
United States (Morton) 🔨	0	1	1	1	0	2	1	1	X	X	7
Slovenia (Lajovec)	0	0	0	0	1	0	0	0	X	X	1

Sheet B	1	2	3	4	5	6	7	8	9	10	Final
Switzerland (Hess)	1	0	2	1	0	2	1	0	1	X	8
Great Britain (Muirhead) 🔨	0	2	0	0	1	0	0	1	0	X	4

Sheet C	1	2	3	4	5	6	7	8	9	10	11	Final
Czech Republic (Klima) 🔨	0	0	1	0	2	0	0	1	0	1	0	5
South Korea (Kim)	1	1	0	1	0	0	0	0	2	0	1	6

Sheet D	1	2	3	4	5	6	7	8	9	10	Final
Turkey (Dikmen) 🔨	0	1	0	0	0	0	1	X	X	X	2
Canada (Beuk)	1	0	2	1	3	0	0	X	X	X	7

Sheet E	1	2	3	4	5	6	7	8	9	10	Final
Sweden (Sundgren) 🔨	0	0	1	0	0	0	2	1	0	0	4
Norway (Hoiberg)	0	2	0	2	0	0	0	0	0	1	5

=== Tiebreaker ===
Thursday, February 3, 14:00

Sheet E	1	2	3	4	5	6	7	8	9	10	Final
Czech Republic (Klima)	0	3	0	1	0	4	0	0	3	X	11
Canada (Beuk) 🔨	1	0	2	0	1	0	2	1	0	X	7

=== Playoffs ===
Semifinals
1	South Korea	5
4	Czech Republic	4
2	Great Britain	8
3	Switzerland	9

Gold Medal Game
1	South Korea	10
3	Switzerland	6
Bronze Medal Game
4	Czech Republic	3
2	Great Britain	2

==== Semifinals ====
Friday, February 4, 13:00

Team	1	2	3	4	5	6	7	8	9	10	Final
South Korea (Kim) 🔨	0	0	1	0	0	2	0	1	0	1	5
Czech Republic (Klima)	0	0	0	1	0	0	1	0	2	0	4

Team	1	2	3	4	5	6	7	8	9	10	11	Final
Great Britain (Muirhead)	0	1	0	1	0	1	0	2	0	3	0	8
Switzerland (Hess) 🔨	3	0	1	0	2	0	1	0	1	0	1	9

==== Bronze Medal Game ====
Friday, February 4, 19:00

Team	1	2	3	4	5	6	7	8	9	10	Final
Czech Republic (Klima)	0	0	0	0	1	0	1	0	0	1	3
Great Britain (Muirhead) 🔨	0	0	1	0	0	0	0	1	0	0	2

==== Gold Medal Game ====
Saturday, February 5, 14:00

Team	1	2	3	4	5	6	7	8	9	10	Final
South Korea (Kim) 🔨	0	4	0	2	0	1	0	3	0	X	10
Switzerland (Hess)	0	0	1	0	2	0	2	0	1	X	6

== Women ==
=== Teams ===
Canada	China	Czech Republic	Germany	Great Britain
Skip: Brooklyn Lemon Third: Chelsey Peterson; Second: Ashley Green; Lead: Nicole Lang; Alternate: Sarah Watamanuk	Skip: Sun Yue Third: Liu Sijia; Second: Chen Yinjie; Lead: She Qiutong; Alternate: Jiang Yilun	Skip: Anna Kubesková Third: Linda Klímová; Second: Tereza Plisková; Lead: Eliska Jalovcová; Alternate: Kamila Mošová	Skip: Pia-Lisa Schöll Third: Franzi Fischer; Second: Ann Kathrin Bastian; Lead: Josephine Obermann; Alternate: Anne-Christine Barthel	Skip: Anna Sloan Third: Lauren Gray; Second: Vicki Adams; Lead: Sarah Macintyre; Alternate: Claire Hamilton
Japan	South Korea	Poland	Russia	Turkey
Skip: Sayaka Yoshimura Third: Rina Ida; Second: Risa Ujihara; Lead: Mao Ishigaki; Alternate: Midori Hachimaru	Skip: Kim Ji-sun Third: Lee Seul-bee; Second: Gim Un-chi; Lead: Lee Hye-soo	Skip: Magdalena Muskus Third: Elzbieta Ran; Second: Magda Straczek; Lead: Magdalena Dumanowska; Alternate: Dominika Muskus	Skip: Anna Sidorova Third: Margarita Fomina; Second: Ekaterina Antonova; Lead: Ekaterina Galkina; Alternate: Liudmila Privivkova	Skip: Öznur Polat Third: Elif Kızılkaya; Second: Burcu Pehlivan; Lead: Şeyda Zengin; Alternate: Ayşe Gözütok

=== Standings ===
Country	W	L
Great Britain	8	1
Russia	7	2
South Korea	6	3
Japan	6	3
China	5	4
Canada	4	5
Czech Republic	4	5
Germany	3	6
Poland	2	7
Turkey	0	9

=== Results ===
==== Draw 1 ====
Friday, January 28, 9:00

Sheet A	1	2	3	4	5	6	7	8	9	10	Final
Great Britain (Sloan)	1	0	3	0	0	1	0	0	1	0	6
Czech Republic (Kubeskova) 🔨	0	1	0	1	1	0	2	0	0	2	7

Sheet B	1	2	3	4	5	6	7	8	9	10	11	Final
China (Sun)	0	0	1	0	1	0	0	2	0	1	1	6
Germany (Schöll) 🔨	1	0	0	1	0	0	1	0	2	0	0	5

Sheet C	1	2	3	4	5	6	7	8	9	10	Final
Turkey (Polat)	0	1	0	3	1	0	0	1	0	X	3
Poland (Muskus) 🔨	2	0	0	3	2	0	0	0	1	X	8

Sheet D	1	2	3	4	5	6	7	8	9	10	Final
Canada (Lemon)	0	0	1	0	0	0	2	0	1	X	4
Japan (Yoshimura) 🔨	0	1	0	0	1	1	2	0	0	X	6

Sheet E	1	2	3	4	5	6	7	8	9	10	Final
Russia (Sidorova)	0	0	1	0	0	0	1	0	2	0	4
South Korea (Kim) 🔨	0	1	0	0	1	1	0	1	0	1	5

==== Draw 2 ====
Friday, January 28, 19:00

Sheet A	1	2	3	4	5	6	7	8	9	10	Final
Russia (Sidorova)	0	2	0	3	0	0	0	0	1	2	8
China (Sun) 🔨	2	0	1	0	1	1	0	1	0	0	6

Sheet B	1	2	3	4	5	6	7	8	9	10	Final
Poland (Muskus)	0	0	1	0	0	2	1	0	0	X	4
South Korea (Kim) 🔨	0	2	0	2	0	0	0	3	3	X	10

Sheet C	1	2	3	4	5	6	7	8	9	10	Final
Great Britain (Sloan) 🔨	0	1	0	1	2	1	0	0	2	2	9
Canada (Lemon)	2	0	1	0	0	0	1	1	0	0	5

Sheet D	1	2	3	4	5	6	7	8	9	10	Final
Turkey (Polat)	0	0	0	0	1	0	0	X	X	X	1
Czech Republic (Kubeskova) 🔨	2	0	2	3	0	2	0	X	X	X	9

Sheet E	1	2	3	4	5	6	7	8	9	10	Final
Germany (Schöll) 🔨	1	0	0	1	3	0	0	2	0	0	7
Japan (Yoshimura)	0	2	0	0	0	3	2	0	0	1	8

==== Draw 3 ====
Saturday, January 29, 14:00

Sheet A	1	2	3	4	5	6	7	8	9	10	Final
Japan (Yoshimura)	0	1	0	1	0	2	0	1	0	X	5
South Korea (Kim) 🔨	1	0	1	0	1	0	4	0	2	X	9

Sheet B	1	2	3	4	5	6	7	8	9	10	Final
Czech Republic (Kubeskova)	0	1	0	0	0	1	1	0	3	0	6
Canada (Lemon) 🔨	1	0	1	1	1	0	0	2	0	1	7

Sheet C	1	2	3	4	5	6	7	8	9	10	Final
Germany (Schöll)	0	1	0	2	0	0	0	X	X	X	3
Russia (Sidorova) 🔨	2	0	2	0	2	1	4	X	X	X	11

Sheet D	1	2	3	4	5	6	7	8	9	10	Final
Poland (Muskus) 🔨	1	0	0	0	0	1	0	0	0	X	2
Great Britain (Sloan)	0	2	2	0	0	0	0	2	3	X	9

Sheet E	1	2	3	4	5	6	7	8	9	10	Final
Turkey (Polat) 🔨	0	0	0	0	0	0	1	0	X	X	1
China (Sun)	2	2	3	1	1	1	0	3	X	X	13

==== Draw 4 ====
Sunday, January 30, 9:00

Sheet A	1	2	3	4	5	6	7	8	9	10	Final
Czech Republic (Kubeskova) 🔨	1	1	0	3	0	1	1	1	X	X	8
Germany (Schöll)	0	0	1	0	0	0	0	0	X	X	1

Sheet B	1	2	3	4	5	6	7	8	9	10	Final
Turkey (Polat)	0	1	0	1	0	0	1	0	X	X	3
Great Britain (Sloan) 🔨	0	0	4	0	5	1	0	0	X	X	10

Sheet C	1	2	3	4	5	6	7	8	9	10	Final
China (Sun)	2	2	1	0	2	0	2	0	0	X	9
South Korea (Kim) 🔨	0	0	0	1	0	0	0	3	1	X	5

Sheet D	1	2	3	4	5	6	7	8	9	10	Final
Japan (Yoshimura)	0	1	0	1	0	0	0	X	X	X	2
Russia (Sidorova) 🔨	0	0	2	0	0	2	6	X	X	X	10

Sheet E	1	2	3	4	5	6	7	8	9	10	Final
Canada (Lemon) 🔨	2	0	0	2	1	0	2	0	2	X	9
Poland (Muskus)	0	1	1	0	0	1	0	1	0	X	4

==== Draw 5 ====
Sunday, January 30, 19:00

Sheet A	1	2	3	4	5	6	7	8	9	10	Final
Turkey (Polat)	0	0	1	0	1	0	1	0	X	X	3
Russia (Sidorova) 🔨	2	2	0	6	0	2	0	2	X	X	14

Sheet B	1	2	3	4	5	6	7	8	9	10	Final
Germany (Schöll)	0	0	2	0	1	0	0	3	0	0	6
Poland (Muskus) 🔨	1	0	0	1	0	1	0	0	1	3	7

Sheet C	1	2	3	4	5	6	7	8	9	10	Final
Czech Republic (Kubeskova)	0	0	0	2	0	0	1	0	X	X	3
Japan (Yoshimura) 🔨	2	2	2	0	1	2	0	3	X	X	12

Sheet D	1	2	3	4	5	6	7	8	9	10	Final
China (Sun)	1	0	0	0	1	0	0	0	1	X	3
Canada (Lemon) 🔨	0	0	1	2	0	0	1	1	0	X	5

Sheet E	1	2	3	4	5	6	7	8	9	10	Final
South Korea (Kim) 🔨	2	0	1	0	1	1	0	0	1	0	6
Great Britain	0	1	0	2	0	0	1	1	0	2	7

==== Draw 6 ====
Monday, January 31, 14:00

Sheet A	1	2	3	4	5	6	7	8	9	10	Final
South Korea (Kim)	0	0	1	0	2	1	0	1	0	3	8
Canada (Lemon) 🔨	0	1	0	2	0	0	2	0	2	0	7

Sheet B	1	2	3	4	5	6	7	8	9	10	Final
Great Britain (Sloan)	0	2	1	0	3	0	1	1	0	X	8
Japan (Yoshimura) 🔨	2	0	0	1	0	1	0	0	1	X	5

Sheet C	1	2	3	4	5	6	7	8	9	10	Final
Poland (Muskus) 🔨	0	1	1	0	0	0	0	0	X	X	2
China (Sun)	1	0	0	2	3	0	1	4	X	X	11

Sheet D	1	2	3	4	5	6	7	8	9	10	Final
Germany (Schöll)	0	1	0	0	1	0	4	0	0	2	8
Turkey (Polat) 🔨	0	0	2	2	0	1	0	1	1	0	7

Sheet E	1	2	3	4	5	6	7	8	9	10	Final
Czech Republic (Kubeskova)	0	0	0	0	0	1	X	X	X	X	1
Russia (Sidorova) 🔨	2	1	1	1	3	0	X	X	X	X	8

==== Draw 7 ====
Tuesday, February 1, 9:00

Sheet A	1	2	3	4	5	6	7	8	9	10	Final
China (Sun)	1	0	0	0	1	0	1	0	1	0	4
Great Britain (Sloan) 🔨	0	1	1	1	0	1	0	1	0	1	6

Sheet B	1	2	3	4	5	6	7	8	9	10	Final
South Korea (Kim) 🔨	2	0	3	0	2	2	0	2	X	X	11
Czech Republic (Kubeskova)	0	1	0	2	0	0	2	0	X	X	5

Sheet C	1	2	3	4	5	6	7	8	9	10	Final
Canada (Lemon) 🔨	0	1	0	1	0	2	0	0	0	X	4
Germany (Schöll)	0	0	1	0	3	0	0	3	1	X	8

Sheet D	1	2	3	4	5	6	7	8	9	10	Final
Russia (Sidorova)	0	0	2	0	1	2	0	2	0	X	7
Poland (Muskus) 🔨	0	2	0	1	0	0	1	0	1	X	5

Sheet E	1	2	3	4	5	6	7	8	9	10	Final
Japan (Yoshimura) 🔨	2	0	4	0	2	0	3	1	X	X	12
Turkey (Polat)	0	1	0	1	0	2	0	0	X	X	4

==== Draw 8 ====
Tuesday, February 1, 19:00

Sheet A	1	2	3	4	5	6	7	8	9	10	Final
Poland (Muskus)	0	0	1	0	1	1	0	0	2	0	5
Japan (Yoshimura)	0	2	0	2	0	0	1	0	0	1	6

Sheet B	1	2	3	4	5	6	7	8	9	10	Final
Canada (Lemon)	0	0	0	0	1	0	1	0	1	X	3
Russia (Sidorova)	0	0	1	1	0	1	0	1	0	X	4

Sheet C	1	2	3	4	5	6	7	8	9	10	Final
South Korea (Kim)	1	0	3	1	0	2	1	0	3	X	11
Turkey (Polat)	0	1	0	0	1	0	0	1	0	X	3

Sheet D	1	2	3	4	5	6	7	8	9	10	Final
Czech Republic (Kubeskova)	1	0	0	0	1	0	0	2	0	1	5
China (Sun)	0	2	1	1	0	0	2	0	0	0	6

Sheet E	1	2	3	4	5	6	7	8	9	10	Final
Great Britain (Sloan)	1	1	0	0	2	0	1	0	4	X	9
Germany (Schöll)	0	0	0	1	0	0	0	1	0	X	2

==== Draw 9 ====
Wednesday, February 2, 14:00

Sheet A	1	2	3	4	5	6	7	8	9	10	Final
Canada (Lemon) 🔨	2	1	2	0	4	0	X	X	X	X	9
Turkey (Polat)	0	0	0	2	0	1	X	X	X	X	3

Sheet B	1	2	3	4	5	6	7	8	9	10	Final
Japan (Yoshimura) 🔨	3	0	0	2	0	0	1	1	0	X	7
China (Sun)	0	0	1	0	1	1	0	0	2	X	5

Sheet C	1	2	3	4	5	6	7	8	9	10	Final
Russia (Sidorova) 🔨	0	0	0	1	0	0	1	0	X	X	2
Great Britain (Sloan)	1	0	0	0	0	4	0	2	X	X	8

Sheet D	1	2	3	4	5	6	7	8	9	10	Final
South Korea (Kim)	0	1	0	1	0	1	0	1	0	1	5
Germany (Schöll) 🔨	1	0	2	0	0	0	1	0	2	0	6

Sheet E	1	2	3	4	5	6	7	8	9	10	Final
Poland (Muskus)	0	0	0	2	1	0	1	0	0	X	4
Czech Republic (Kubeskova) 🔨	1	2	2	0	0	1	0	2	5	X	13

=== Playoffs ===
Semifinals
1	Great Britain	11
4	Japan	4
2	Russia	13
3	South Korea	1

Gold Medal Game
1	Great Britain	7
2	Russia	6
Bronze Medal Game
4	Japan	5
3	South Korea	8

==== Semifinals ====
Friday, February 4, 9:00

Team	1	2	3	4	5	6	7	8	9	10	Final
Great Britain (Sloan) 🔨	2	0	1	0	2	0	1	0	5	X	11
Japan (Yoshimura)	0	2	0	1	0	1	0	0	0	X	4

Team	1	2	3	4	5	6	7	8	9	10	Final
Russia (Sidorova) 🔨	0	5	2	3	0	0	2	1	X	X	13
South Korea (Kim)	0	0	0	0	1	0	0	0	X	X	1

==== Bronze Medal Game ====
Friday, February 4, 19:00

Team	1	2	3	4	5	6	7	8	9	10	Final
Japan (Yoshimura)	0	0	0	2	0	2	1	0	0	X	5
South Korea (Kim) 🔨	1	0	2	0	2	0	0	2	1	X	8

==== Gold Medal Game ====
Saturday, February 5, 9:00

Team	1	2	3	4	5	6	7	8	9	10	11	Final
Great Britain (Sloan) 🔨	0	0	0	3	0	2	0	0	1	0	1	7
Russia (Sidorova)	1	1	0	0	1	0	2	0	0	1	0	6

== Medals table ==
Rank	Nation	Gold	Silver	Bronze	Total
1	South Korea	1	0	1	2
2	Great Britain	1	0	0	1
3	Russia	0	1	0	1
3	Switzerland	0	1	0	1
5	Czech Republic	0	0	1	1
Totals (5 entries)		2	2	2	6
