= 2011 Universiade =

2011 Universiade may refer to:

- 2011 Summer Universiade, a summer sporting event held in Shenzhen, China
- 2011 Winter Universiade, a winter sporting event held in Erzurum, Turkey
