= Alpine skiing at the 2011 Winter Universiade =

Alpine skiing at the 2011 Winter Universiade was held at the Palandöken Mountain in Erzurum, Turkey from January 29 to February 6, 2011. There had been no downhill competition.

== Men's events ==
Event	Gold		Silver		Bronze	
Super-G	Adam Zika; Czech Republic	1:06.88	Calle Lindh; Sweden	1:07.08	Bernhard Graf; Austria	1:07.14
Giant slalom	Bernhard Graf; Austria	1:52.04	Adam Zika; Czech Republic	1:52.53	Douglas Hedin; Sweden	1:53.66
Slalom	Seppi Stiegler; United States	1:45.71	Filip Mlinšek; Slovenia	1:45.84	Calle Lindh; Sweden	1:45.92
Super Combined	Bernhard Graf; Austria	1:49.45	Calle Lindh; Sweden	1:49.97	Adam Zika; Czech Republic	1:50.14

== Women's events ==
Event	Gold		Silver		Bronze	
Super-G	Katlyn Hartman; United States	1:11.26	Karolina Chrapek; Poland	1:11.41	Chiara Carratu; Italy	1:11.55
Giant slalom	Jennifer van Wagner; United States	1:53.26	Lucia Mazzotti; Italy	1:53.55	Karolina Chrapek; Poland	1:53.73
Slalom	Sterling Grant; United States	1:44.28	Aleksandra Kluś-Zamiedzowy; Poland	1:44.42	Jana Gantnerová; Slovakia	1:44.66
Super Combined	Aude Aguilaniu; France	1:52.00	Erika Ghent; United States	1:52.31	Charline Vion; France	1:52.78

== Medal table ==
Rank	Nation	Gold	Silver	Bronze	Total
1	United States	4	1	0	5
2	Austria	2	0	1	3
3	Czech Republic	1	1	1	3
4	France	1	0	1	2
5	Sweden	0	2	2	4
6	Poland	0	2	1	3
7	Italy	0	1	1	2
8	Slovenia	0	1	0	1
9	Slovakia	0	0	1	1
Totals (9 entries)		8	8	8	24
