= Figure skating at the 2011 Winter Universiade =

- Type: Senior international
- Date: 1 – 5 February
- Season: 2010–11
- Location: Erzurum, Turkey
- Venue: GSIM Yenişehir Ice Hockey Hall
- Previous: 2009 Winter Universiade
- Next: 2013 Winter Universiade

Figure skating was competed at the 2011 Winter Universiade. Skaters competed in the disciplines of men's singles, ladies' singles, pair skating, ice dancing, and synchronized skating. The competitions took place at the GSIM Yenişehir Ice Hockey Hall between February 1 and 5, 2011.

== Medalists ==
Discipline	Gold	Silver	Bronze
Men's singles	(Japan) Nobunari Oda	(Russia) Sergei Voronov	(Japan) Daisuke Murakami
Ladies' singles	(France) Candice Didier	(Spain) Sonia Lafuente	(Japan) Shion Kokubun
Pair skating	(Russia) Lubov Iliushechkina / Nodari Maisuradze	(China) Dong Huibo / Wu Yiming	(China) Zhang Yue / Wang Lei
Ice dancing	(Russia) Kristina Gorshkova / Vitali Butikov	(Turkey) Alisa Agafonova / Alper Uçar	(Ukraine) Nadezhda Frolenkova / Mikhail Kasalo
Synchronized skating	(Finland) Rockettes	(Finland) Marigold IceUnity	(Russia) Paradise

== Medal table ==
Rank	Nation	Gold	Silver	Bronze	Total
1	Russia	2	1	1	4
2	Finland	1	1	0	2
3	Japan	1	0	2	3
4	France	1	0	0	1
5	China	0	1	1	2
6	Spain	0	1	0	1
6	Turkey	0	1	0	1
8	Ukraine	0	0	1	1
Totals (8 entries)		5	5	5	15
