= Rojbin Ören =

Turkish national cross-country skier (born 1992)

Rojbin Ören (born 1992) is a Turkish former national cross-country skier, physical education teacher, and coach.

== Biography ==
Ören was born in Yüksekova, Hakkari. She began skiing at the age of 11, inspired by the athletic successes of her brother and uncle. Despite the harsh winter conditions and high altitude of her hometown, she utilized the environment to her advantage to develop her skills. Rojbin Ören first rose to the Turkish National Team in 2006. She achieved this rank just one year after she began her skiing career in 2005, and she is the first female athlete from her region to represent Turkey as a national athlete.

== Sporting career ==
Ören competed in cross-country skiing, Nordic disciplines, and biathlon, representing Turkey at national, European, and Balkan competitions. Between 2006 and 2013, she earned multiple podium finishes at Turkish national championships and won medals at Balkan championships. She placed sixth at a World Championship event in Italy.

She also competed in ice hockey and athletics, finishing third with her university team at the 2012 Turkish Ice Hockey Championship. Later, she served for three years as a coach for the Turkish National Ski Team, including the women’s team.

== Coaching and later career ==
After returning to Yüksekova as a physical education teacher, Ören became active in youth sports development and served as Sports, Cultural and Social Project Coordinator at the local Directorate of National Education.

She volunteers as a cross-country skiing coach for middle school students, training them near the Dilimli Dam. She believes Yüksekova’s high altitude and harsh winters provide ideal conditions for endurance sports. Under her guidance, several students have achieved national success.
