= Canada at the 2011 Winter Universiade =

- IOC code: CAN

in Erzurum
- Competitors: 102 in 7 sports
- Officials: 39
- Medals Ranked 14th: Gold 1 Silver 3 Bronze 1 Total 5

Winter Universiade appearances
- 1960; 1962; 1964; 1966; 1968; 1972; 1978; 1981; 1983; 1985; 1987; 1989; 1991; 1993; 1995; 1997; 1999; 2001; 2003; 2005; 2007; 2009; 2011; 2013; 2015; 2017; 2019; 2023; 2025

Canada competed at the 2011 Winter Universiade in Erzurum, Turkey. Canada sent a team of 102 athletes and 39 officials.

== Alpine skiing ==
Canada sent 5 male and 6 female athletes for a total of 11.

Men

- Christopher Barber
- Philippe Crête-Belzile
- Olivier Lacaille
- Braden Long
- Simon Mannella

Women

- Maëlle Bergeron
- Kendall Brown
- Catherine Morel
- Rebecca Nadler
- Nicole Poleschuk
- Marie-France Tessier

== Biathlon ==
Canada's team consisted of 8 athletes.

Men

- Jonathan Forward
- Alex Frost
- Jaime Robb
- Jon Skinstad

Women

- Lauren Brookes
- Elizabeth Mawdsley
- Carly Shiell
- Kathryn Stone

== Cross-country skiing ==
Canada's team consisted of 10 athletes.

Men

- Colin Abbott
- Benjamin Hebert
- Jesse Heckrodt
- Anthony Killick
- Vincent Ruel

Women

- Adele Lay
- Alexia Pichard-Jolicouer
- Zoe Roy
- Mary Thompson
- Maja Zimmermann

== Curling ==
Canada sent a men's and women's team.

Men

Skip: Jonathan Beuk
Third: Andrew Inouye
Second: Chadd Vandermade
Lead: Scott Chadwick
Alternate: Andrew Minty

=== Standings ===
Country	W	L
Canada		
China		
Czech Republic		
Great Britain		
South Korea		
Norway		
Turkey		
Sweden		
Switzerland		
United States		

Women

Skip: Brooklyn Lemon
Third: Chelsey Peterson
Second: Ashley Green
Lead: Nicole Lang
Alternate: Sarah Watamanuk

=== Standings ===
Country	W	L
Canada		
China		
Czech Republic		
Germany		
Great Britain		
Japan		
South Korea		
Russia		
Turkey		
United States		

== Ice hockey ==
Canada sent a men's and women's team.

=== Men ===
==== Group B ====
Team	GP	W	OTW	OTL	L	GF	GA	DIF	PTS
Canada	0	0	0	0	0	0	0	0	0
South Korea	0	0	0	0	0	0	0	0	0
Belarus	0	0	0	0	0	0	0	0	0
Slovenia	0	0	0	0	0	0	0	0	0

January 27, 2011; 16:00	Slovenia	v	Canada	3000 Ice Rink, Erzurum

January 29, 2011; 20:00	Canada	v	Belarus	3000 Ice Rink, Erzurum

January 31, 2011; 20:00	Canada	v	South Korea	3000 Ice Rink, Erzurum

Roster

Goalies

- Anthony Grieco
- Jim Watt

Defense

- Scott Aarssen
- Marc-André Dorion
- Dominic Jalbert
- Geoff Killing
- Tim Priamo
- Jordan Smith
- Kyle Sonnenburg

Forwards

- Kevin Baker
- Matt Caria
- Francis Charland
- Yashar Farmanara
- Thomas Kiriakou
- Maxime Langelier-Parent
- Brandon MacLean
- Chris Ray
- Jean-Michel Rizk
- Matthieu Methot
- Keaton Turkiewicz
- Ryan Berard
- Evan Vossen

=== Women ===
==== Group A ====
Six participating teams were placed in one group. After playing a round-robin, the top four teams in each group plus to the Semifinals. The fifth and sixth placed teams played a playoff for fifth place.

Team advanced to Semifinals
Team competes in Placing Round

Team	GP	W	OTW	OTL	L	GF	GA	DIF	PTS
Canada	5	4	1	0	0	39	1	+38	14
Finland	5	4	0	1	0	49	3	+46	13
Slovakia	5	3	0	0	2	33	11	+22	9
United States	5	2	0	0	3	25	18	+7	6
Great Britain	5	1	0	0	4	11	36	−25	3
Turkey	5	0	0	0	5	0	88	−88	0

==== Schedule ====
January 27, 2011; 16:00	Canada	2–1 GWS ( 0–0, 0–1, 1–0 ) ( OT: 0–0 ) ( SO: 1–0 )	Finland	500 Ice Rink, Erzurum

Game reference

January 28, 2011; 19:00	Canada	3–0 (3–0, 0–0, 0–0)	Slovakia	500 Ice Rink, Erzurum

Game reference

January 30, 2011; 11:00	Canada	14–0 (4–0, 4–0, 6–0)	Great Britain	500 Ice Rink, Erzurum

Game reference

January 31, 2011; 11:00	United States	0–9 (0–3, 0–4, 0–2)	Canada	500 Ice Rink, Erzurum

Game reference

February 2, 2011; 20:00	Turkey	0–11 (0–4, 0–4, 0–3)	Canada	3000 Ice Rink, Erzurum

Game reference

===== Semifinals =====
February 4, 2011; 20:00	Canada	8–1 (2–1, 3–0, 3–0)	United States	3000 Ice Rink, Erzurum

Game reference

===== Finals =====
February 5, 2011; 13:00	Canada	4–1 (1–0, 2–0, 1–1)	Finland	3000 Ice Rink, Erzurum; Attendance: 2,111

http://www.universiadeerzurum.org/pdfts/IHW400101/C74

Liz Knox
Goalies
Anna Vanhatalo
Referees:
(United States) Leah O'Brian
(Slovakia) Magdalena Cerhitova, (Slovakia) Michaela Kudelova

Deschenes – 18:29	1 – 0
Zerafa – 24:01	2 – 0
Bettez – 35:14	3 – 0
	3 – 1	42:19 – Hovi (Tuomanen) (PP)
Hill (Styles, Webster) (PP) – 56:27	4 – 1

4 min
Penalties
6 min
34
Shots
21

The Women's team was the defending champion.

Goalies

- Beth Clause
- Liz Knox

Defense

- Jenna Downey
- Suzanne Fenerty
- Carly Hill
- Caitlin MacDonald
- Alicia Martin
- Jacalyn Sollis
- Kelsey Webster

Forwards

- Ann-Sophie Bettez
- Vanessa Davidson
- Kim Deschênes
- Breanne George
- Alicia Martin
- Jacalyn Sollis
- Jocelyn Leblanc
- Andrea Ironside
- Addie Miles
- Mariève Provost
- Ellie Seedhouse
- Candice Styles
- Courtney Unruh
- Jessica Zerafa

== Short track speed skating ==
Canada sent 5 male and 5 female athletes for a total of 10.

Men

- Gabriel Chiasson-Poirier
- Vincent Cournoyer
- Allyn Gagnon
- Pier-Olivier Gagnon
- Liam McFarlane

Women

- Sabrina Bourgela
- Andréa Do-Duc
- Valérie Lambert
- Kristy Shoebridge
- Gabrielle Waddell

== Snowboarding ==
Canada sent 7 male and 2 female athletes for a total of 9.

Men

- Antoine Laurin-Lalonde
- Dylan Riley
- Frédéric Laurin-Lalonde
- Mackenzie Carter
- Pierce Smith
- Rob Ritchie
- Taylor Ronsky

Women

- Annfred Grenier
- Justine Côté
