= 2011 Winter Universiade =

Multi-sport event in Erzurum, Turkey

XXV Winter Universiade XXV Kış Üniversite Oyunları
- 2011 Winter Universiade's official logo
- Host city: Erzurum, Turkey
- Nations: 58
- Athletes: 1,880
- Events: 66 in 11 sports
- Opening: January 27, 2011
- Closing: February 6, 2011
- Opened by: Abdullah Gül, President of Turkey
- Athlete's Oath: Tuğba Daşdemir
- Judge's Oath: Ece Esen
- Torch lighter: Kenan Sofuoğlu, Selçuk Çebi, Neslihan Darnel, Gizem Girişmen
- Main venue: Kazım Karabekir Stadium
- Website: universiadeerzurum.org (archived)

Winter

Summer

The XXV Winter Universiade, took place in Erzurum, Turkey between 27 January to 6 February. Erzurum is the city at the highest altitude in Turkey, at 1,850 m (6,070 ft), and has over 320 cultural landmarks. Located in Eastern Anatolia region, it is a city on the traditional Silk Road and has been governed by many cultures over the centuries. The Erzurum Ice Hockey Arena, located on the Cemal Gürsel Sports Campus, was newly built with an ice rink of 60m x 30m and 3,000 seats for spectators.

== Venues ==
Snow disciplines

The Konaklı Ski Resort, devoted to alpine skiing competitions, is located 17 km (11 mi) from the city center, stretching over a terrain of 460 ha (1.8 sq mi). Four ski lifts serve six race courses for slalom, giant slalom and Super Giant slalom events.

The Kandilli Ski Resort, located 36 km (22 mi) from the city center at an altitude of 1,713–1,767 m (5,620–5,797 ft) and stretching over 160 ha (0.62 sq mi) land, is the venue for biathlon and Nordic combined competitions.

The Palandöken Ski Resort is located 4 km (2.5 mi) at an altitude of 3,271 m (10,732 ft). It hosts snowboarding and freestyle skiing competitions.

The Kiremitlik Hill Ski Jumping Facility is situated north of Palandöken Ski Resort and south of the athletes' village. It consists of two jumping towers and two take-off ramps for large hill (K125) and normal hill (K95) competitions, as well as three more ramps (K65, K40 and K20) for training.

Ice disciplines

The Erzurum Ice Skating Arena, opened in March 2009, is a 30 m × 60 m (98 ft × 197 ft) indoor ice rink situated in Palandöken neighborhood of Erzurum. The arena, having a seating capacity of 2000, hosts short-track speed skating and figure skating events.

The newly built Erzurum Universiade Ice Arena consists of two ice rinks of 30 m × 60 m (98 ft × 197 ft) different in audience capacity. The men's ice hockey matches are played in the 3000 ice rink and the women's matches in the 500 ice rink.

The Milli Piyango Curling Arena is an indoor ice rink consisting of five curling sheets. Opened in September 2010, it has a seating capacity of 1,000 people.

== Sports ==
Freestyling Skiing, Nordic Combined and Ski Jumping are the optional sports.

Numbers in parentheses indicate the number of medal events contested in each sport.

- Alpine skiing (8)
- Biathlon (9)
- Cross-country skiing (11)
- Curling (2)
- Figure skating (5)
- Freestyle skiing (4)
- Ice hockey (2)
- Nordic combined (3)
- Short track speed skating (8)
- Ski jumping (4)
- Snowboarding (6)

== Participants ==
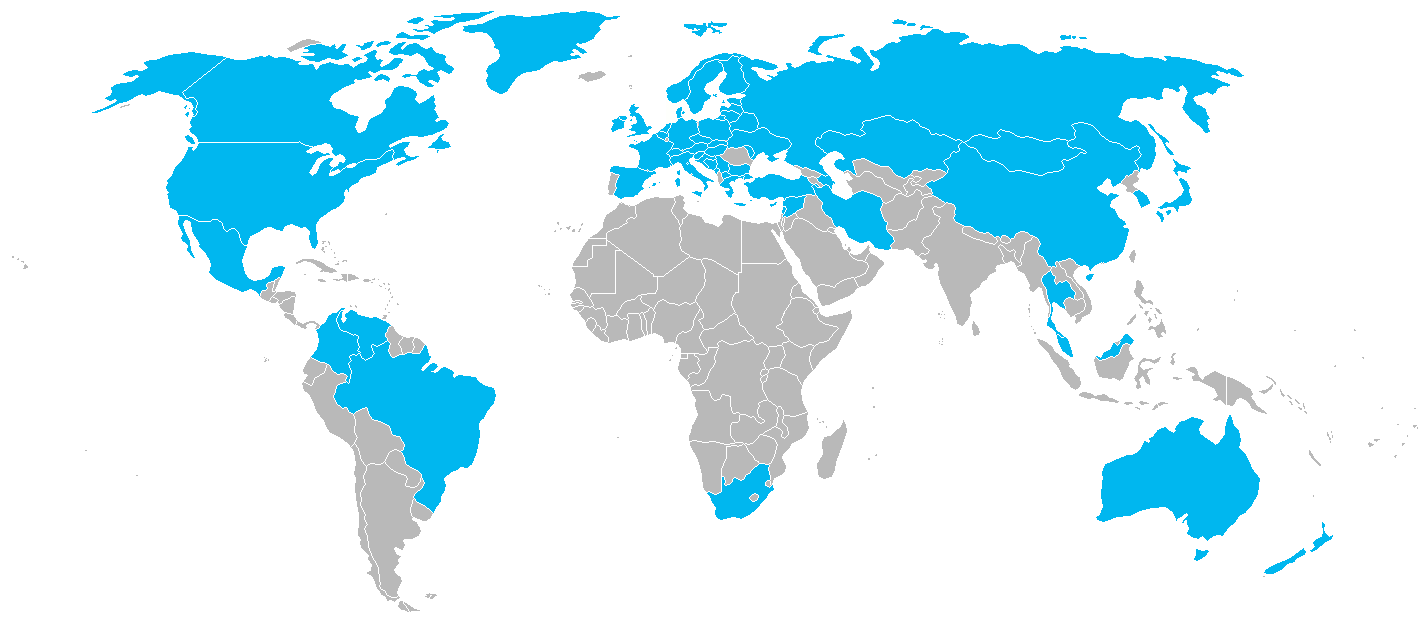

Following is a list of nations that were sent invitations to attend the Universiade: Malaysia and Venezuela made their debuts. Syria was on the entry list but later withdrew; this would have marked Syria's debut. With 58 nations competing, it represented the largest number of nations ever to compete, and increase of 8 from the previous high at the 2005 games in Innsbruck. A total of 1880 athletes and 849 officials participated in the Universiade. Moldova, Thailand, and San Marino who were present at the 2009 Winter Universiade in Harbin did not send athletes to the games.

- Australia (11)
- Austria (26)
- Azerbaijan (1)
- Belarus (57)
- Belgium (6)
- Bosnia and Herzegovina (1)
- Brazil (4)
- Bulgaria (7)
- Canada (102)
- China (76)
- Chinese Taipei (1)
- Colombia (1)
- Croatia (4)
- Czech Republic (81)
- Denmark (1)
- Estonia (16)
- Finland (88)
- France (58)
- Germany (30)
- Great Britain (49)
- Greece (7)
- Hungary (26)
- Iran (13)
- Ireland (7)
- Italy (49)
- Japan (97)
- Kazakhstan (39)
- South Korea (91)
- Kyrgyzstan (2)
- Latvia (4)
- Lebanon (6)
- Lithuania (8)
- Macedonia (2)
- Malaysia (1)
- Mexico (1)
- Moldova
- Monaco (1)
- Mongolia (15)
- Montenegro (1)
- Nepal
- Netherlands (14)
- New Zealand (18)
- Norway (8)
- Poland (75)
- Russia (176)
- San Marino
- Serbia (15)
- Slovakia (61)
- Slovenia (56)
- South Africa (2)
- Spain (40)
- Sweden (59)
- Switzerland (48)
- Thailand
- Turkey (158)
- Ukraine (78)
- United States (81)
- Venezuela (1)

== Medal table ==
The host nation, Turkey, is highlighted in lavender blue.

* Host nation (Turkey)

| Rank | Nation | Gold | Silver | Bronze | Total |
|---|---|---|---|---|---|
| 1 | Russia | 14 | 14 | 11 | 39 |
| 2 | South Korea | 7 | 3 | 5 | 15 |
| 3 | Ukraine | 6 | 5 | 4 | 15 |
| 4 | Slovakia | 5 | 0 | 3 | 8 |
| 5 | France | 4 | 4 | 5 | 13 |
| 6 | Japan | 4 | 3 | 3 | 10 |
| 7 | United States | 4 | 2 | 0 | 6 |
| 8 | China | 3 | 3 | 4 | 10 |
| 9 | Germany | 3 | 3 | 1 | 7 |
| 10 | Czech Republic | 2 | 2 | 3 | 7 |
| 10 | Slovenia | 2 | 2 | 3 | 7 |
| 12 | Switzerland | 2 | 1 | 2 | 5 |
| 13 | Austria | 2 | 1 | 1 | 4 |
| 14 | Canada | 1 | 3 | 1 | 5 |
| 15 | Italy | 1 | 2 | 4 | 7 |
| 16 | Finland | 1 | 2 | 0 | 3 |
| 17 | Kazakhstan | 1 | 0 | 5 | 6 |
| 18 | Great Britain | 1 | 0 | 0 | 1 |
| 19 | Poland | 0 | 6 | 2 | 8 |
| 20 | Bulgaria | 0 | 2 | 2 | 4 |
| 20 | Sweden | 0 | 2 | 2 | 4 |
| 22 | Belarus | 0 | 1 | 1 | 2 |
| 23 | Spain | 0 | 1 | 0 | 1 |
| 23 | Turkey* | 0 | 1 | 0 | 1 |
| 25 | Hungary | 0 | 0 | 1 | 1 |
| Totals (25 entries) | | 63 | 63 | 63 | 189 |

== Schedule ==
| OC | Opening ceremony | ● | Event competitions | 1 | Event finals | EG | Exhibition gala | CC | Closing ceremony |

| January/February | 27th Thu | 28th Fri | 29th Sat | 30th Sun | 31st Mon | 1st Tue | 2nd Wed | 3rd Thu | 4th Fri | 5th Sat | 6th Sun | T |
|---|---|---|---|---|---|---|---|---|---|---|---|---|
| Ceremonies | OC | | | | | | | | | | CC | |
| Alpine skiing | | | 1 | 1 | | ● | 2 | 1 | 1 | 1 | 1 | 8 |
| Biathlon | | | 2 | | | 2 | 2 | | 1 | 2 | | 9 |
| Cross-country skiing | | 2 | 2 | | 2 | | 2 | 1 | | 2 | | 11 |
| Curling | | ● | ● | ● | ● | ● | ● | | ● | 2 | | 2 |
| Figure Skating | | | | | | ● | 2 | 1 | 2 | EG | | 5 |
| Freestyle skiing | | 2 | | | | | | | ● | 2 | | 4 |
| Ice hockey | ● | ● | ● | ● | ● | ● | ● | ● | ● | 1 | 1 | 2 |
| Nordic combined | | 1 | | 1 | | 1 | | | | | | 3 |
| Short track speed skating | | 2 | 2 | 4 | | | | | | | | 8 |
| Ski jumping | | 1 | 1 | | 1 | | | 1 | | | | 4 |
| Snowboarding | | | ● | 2 | | 2 | | ● | 2 | | 2 | 8 |
| Total Events | | 8 | 8 | 8 | 4 | 6 | 6 | 4 | 6 | 10 | 4 | 64 |
| January/February | 27th Thu | 28th Fri | 29th Sat | 30th Sun | 31st Mon | 1st Tue | 2nd Wed | 3rd Thu | 4th Fri | 5th Sat | 6th Sun | T |
