= Nordic combined at the 2011 Winter Universiade =

Nordic combined at the 2011 Winter Universiade will be held at the Kiremitlik Tepe in Erzurum, Turkey. The three events are scheduled for January 28 - February 1, 2011.

== Events ==
Event	Gold		Silver		Bronze	
Individual Gundersen	Tommy Schmid; Switzerland	27:53.8	Steffen Tepel; Germany	28:04.6	Ivan Panin; Russia	28:09.1
Mass start	Aguri Shimizu; Japan	250.0	Tomasz Pochwala; Poland	239.5	Tommy Schmid; Switzerland	237.5
Team Gundersen	Russia (RUS) I Mikhail Barinov; Konstantin Voronin; Ivan Panin	40:26.7	Poland (POL); Mateusz Wantulok; Andrzej Zarycki; Tomasz Pochwala	40:26.8	Russia (RUS) II; Damir Khinsertdinov; Denis Isaikin; Niyaz Nabeev	41:07.8

== Medals table ==
Rank	Nation	Gold	Silver	Bronze	Total
1	Russia	1	0	2	3
2	Switzerland	1	0	1	2
3	Japan	1	0	0	1
4	Poland	0	2	0	2
5	Germany	0	1	0	1
Totals (5 entries)		3	3	3	9
