= Turkish National Police Academy =

Police university in Ankara, Turkey

- Polis Akademisi
- Motto: We are the guardians of indivisible unity and peace
- Type: Police Academy (State university)
- Established: 6 November 1937
- Affiliations: Ministry of Interior
- President: Prof. Dr. Murat Balcı
- Location: Ankara, Turkey; 39.802°N 32.814°E
- Campus: Gölbaşı, Anittepe
- Language: Turkish, English
- Website: www.pa.edu.tr

The Turkish National Police Academy (Turkish: Polis Akademisi, PA) is a public police university located in Ankara, Turkey. Operating under the General Directorate of Security, the academy provides undergraduate and graduate education in security and forensic sciences, as well as professional training for future police officers and leaders.

== History ==
The academy was established as the Police Institute in 1937 to provide in-service training for police officers. In 1940, it became a two-year college, and in 1962, was recognized as a three-year higher education institution. Since 1984, it has offered undergraduate education and was officially renamed the Police Academy. Following structural changes in 1991 and 2001, the academy expanded to include various faculties and institutes, gaining full university status. In 2015, with further reforms, its structure and authority were broadened to serve as the central body managing police education and human resources for the Turkish police force.

== Organization ==
The Police Academy is headed by a president appointed by the President of Turkey. The current president is Prof. Dr. Murat Balcı. The academy consists of several specialized training and research institutions:

- Police Chiefs Training Center (PAEM): Established in 2015 to train mid- and senior-level police executives.
- Police Vocational Schools (PMYO): Two-year associate degree schools in various cities, providing education for entry-level police officers.
- Police Training Centers (POMEM): Institutions offering police training courses, primarily for university graduates.
- In-Service Training Centers (PEM): Provide continuing education and in-service courses for police personnel.
- Graduate Institutes:
  - Institute of Security Sciences (GBE): Offers master's and doctoral programs in security studies, international security, criminal justice, and related fields.
  - Institute of Forensic Sciences (ABE): Established in 2012, provides postgraduate programs in forensic sciences, natural sciences, and information technologies.
  - Institute of Traffic Sciences (TBE): Founded in 2023 to train experts and researchers in traffic safety and management.

The academy also houses multiple research centers, such as:

- Center for International Terrorism and Transnational Crime
- Intelligence Science Center
- Crime Prevention Research Center
- Forensic Science Research Center
- Traffic Research Center
- Security Education Research Center
- Security Management Research Center

== Education and Training ==
The academy provides a variety of degree and professional development programs:

- Police Chiefs Training Center (PAEM): Trains police inspectors and mid/senior-level managers. Admission is via competitive exams, open to serving police officers and qualified civilians.
- Police Vocational Schools (PMYO): Two-year associate degree program for high school graduates; successful graduates are appointed as police officers.
- Police Training Centers (POMEM): Eight-month intensive training for university graduates, culminating in appointment as police officers.

== Graduate Education ==
The institutes offer master's and doctoral programs in areas such as security strategies, international security, forensic sciences, criminal justice, crime research, and traffic safety. The programs train both academic staff and expert professionals for the police and related agencies.

== Campuses ==
The academy's main campus is in Gölbaşı, Ankara, with additional facilities in Anittepe. The PMYO and POMEM schools are located in several provinces across Turkey.

== International Relations ==
The academy participates in international security research and EU education programs, including Erasmus+, and collaborates with foreign police academies and universities.

== See also ==
- General Directorate of Security (Turkey)
- Law enforcement in Turkey
- Education in Turkey
