= United States at the 2011 Winter Universiade =

- IOC code: USA
- NOC: United States Olympic Committee
- Website: www.teamusa.org

in Erzurum
- Competitors: 81 in 6 sports
- Officials: 36
- Medals Ranked 7th: Gold 4 Silver 2 Bronze 0 Total 6

Winter Universiade appearances (overview)
- 1966; 1968; 1972; 1978; 1981; 1983; 1985; 1987; 1989; 1991; 1993; 1995; 1997; 1999; 2001; 2003; 2005; 2007; 2009; 2011; 2013; 2015; 2017; 2019; 2023; 2025

The United States competed at the 2011 Winter Universiade in Erzurum, Turkey.

== Medalists ==
Medal	Name	Sport	Event	Date
Gold	Kaitlyn Hartman	Alpine skiing	Women's super-G	January 29
Gold	Jennifer VanWagner	Alpine skiing	Women's giant slalom	February 3
Gold	Sterling Grant	Alpine skiing	Women's slalom	February 5
Gold	Josef Stiegler	Alpine skiing	Men's slalom	February 6
Silver	Erika Ghent	Alpine skiing	Women's super combined	February 1

== Alpine skiing ==
The US Alpine skiing team consists of 12 athletes:

- Adam Avrin
- Lindsay Cone
- Kirsten Cooper
- Jeremy Elliot
- Erika Ghent
- Sterling Grant
- Kaitlyn Hartman
- Grant Jampolsky
- Josef Stiegler
- Robert Tarberry
- Tague Thorson
- Jennifer VanWagner

=== Men ===
Athlete	Event	Run Time	Rank
Grant Jampolsky	Super-G	1:08.00	6
Grant Jampolsky	Super combined	1:50.96	4
Grant Jampolsky	Giant slalom	2:10.04	63
Jeremy Elliot	Super-G	1:08.23	9
Jeremy Elliot	Super combined	53:62	59
Jeremy Elliot	Giant slalom	1:53.75	4
Jeremy Elliot	Slalom	1:49.25	21
Taggart Spenst	Super-G	1:08.96	18
Taggart Spenst	Super combined	1:53.15	23
Taggart Spenst	Giant slalom	DNF	–
Taggart Spenst	Slalom	DNF	–
Josef Stiegler	Super-G	1:10.21	32
Josef Stiegler	Super combined	1:51.95	11
Josef Stiegler	Giant slalom	1:54.11	6
Josef Stiegler	Slalom	1:45.71	1st place, gold medalist(s)
Tague Thorson	Super-G	DNF	–
Tague Thorson	Super combined	DSQ	–
Tague Thorson	Giant slalom	DNS	–
Tague Thorson	Slalom	DNF	–
Robert Tarberry	Super-G	DNF	–
Robert Tarberry	Super combined	1:51.55	7
Robert Tarberry	Giant slalom	1:54.40	7
Robert Tarberry	Slalom	1:47.89	7

=== Women ===
Athlete	Event	Run Time	Rank
Kaitlyn Hartman	Super-G	1:11.26	1st place, gold medalist(s)
Erika Ghent	Super-G	1:11.75	4
Erika Ghent	Super combined	46.39	2nd place, silver medalist(s)
Erika Ghent	Giant slalom	1:54.87	9
Erika Ghent	Slalom	1:47.77	9
Lindsay Cone	Super-G	1:12.68	11
Lindsay Cone	Super combined	49.80	26
Lindsay Cone	Giant slalom	1:56.04	21
Lindsay Cone	Slalom	1:45.47	5
Jennifer VanWagner	Super-G	1:12.98	15
Jennifer VanWagner	Super combined	48.88	21
Jennifer VanWagner	Giant slalom	1:53.26	1st place, gold medalist(s)
Jennifer VanWagner	Slalom	DNF	–
Kristen Cooper	Super-G	1:13.00	16
Kristen Cooper	Super combined	1:00.77	43
Kristen Cooper	Giant slalom	1:54.89	10
Kristen Cooper	Slalom	DNF	–
Sterling Grant	Super-G	1:57.36	29
Sterling Grant	Slalom	1:44.28	1st place, gold medalist(s)

== Biathlon ==
The US Biathlon team consists of 4 athletes:

- Brandon Adams
- Steven Carroll
- Kayla Harju-Carreon
- Brandon Pulst

=== Men ===
Event	Athletes	Time	Rank
20 km individual	Brandon Adams	1:30:51.7	48
20 km individual	Brandon Pulst	1:46:07.6	49
20 km individual	Steven Carroll	–	DSQ
10 km sprint	Brandon Adams	39:28.4	44
10 km sprint	Steven Carroll	44:55.5	47
10 km sprint	Brandon Pulst	–	DNF
12.5 km pursuit	Brandon Adams	–	LAP
12.5 km pursuit	Steven Carroll	–	LAP

=== Women ===
Event	Athletes	Time	Rank
15 km individual	Kayla Harju-Carreon	1:33:08.8	40
7.5 km sprint	Kayla Harju-Carreon	44:44.3	40
10 km pursuit	Kayla Harju-Carreon	–	LAP
12.5 km mass start	Kayla Harju-Carreon	–	DNS

== Cross-country skiing ==
The US Cross-country skiing team consists of 14 athletes:

- Gwynn Barrows
- Marie Cartwright
- Morgan Cropsey
- Sarah Dixson
- Michael Fitzgerald
- Nathaniel Hough
- Sarah Johnson
- Daniel Lewis
- Shanna McCleary
- Cara Noseworthy
- Devin Oderwald
- Eliah Pedersen
- Kai Sharp
- William Via

=== Men ===
Event	Athletes	Qualification		Quarterfinals		Semifinals		Finals	
Event	Athletes	Time	Rank	Time	Rank	Time	Rank	Time	Rank
10 km classic	Kai Sharp							32:15.7	54
10 km classic	Eliah Pedersen							32:31.5	56
10 km classic	Daniel Lewis							33:44.8	58
10 km classic	Daniel Oderwald							35:34.9	61
10 km classic	William Via							DNS	–
Individual sprint
Individual sprint	Daniel Lewis	3:25.4	47	did not advance					
Individual sprint	Nathaniel Hough	3:32.9	52	did not advance					
Individual sprint	Eliah Pedersen	3:36.1	54	did not advance					
Individual sprint	Kai Sharp	3:38.2	56	did not advance					
Individual sprint	Daniel Oderwald	3:39.5	57	did not advance					
Individual sprint	Michael Fitzgerald	3:44.2	59	did not advance					
15 km pursuit	Eliah Pedersen							53:24.0	48
15 km pursuit	Nathaniel Hough							53:51.9	49
15 km pursuit	Kai Sharp							54:03.7	50
15 km pursuit	Daniel Lewis							55:23.9	52
15 km pursuit	Michael Fitzgerald							1:00:17.5	54
15 km pursuit	William Via							1:00:43.7	55
4 x 10 km relay	Devin Oderwald; Nathaniel Hough; Eliah Pedersen; Daniel Lewis							2:07:13.8	11

=== Women ===
Event	Athletes	Quarterfinals		Semifinals		Finals	
Event	Athletes	Time	Rank	Time	Rank	Time	Rank
5 km classic	Gwynn Barrows					18:45.4	45
5 km classic	Marie Cartwright					19:40.8	51
5 km classic	Morgan Cropsey					20:01.0	53
5 km classic	Sarah Johnson					21:04.9	56
5 km classic	Cara Noseworthy					21:13.3	57
5 km classic	Sarah Dixson					22:29.8	59
Individual sprint	Gwynn Barrows						41
Individual sprint	Marie Cartwright						49
Individual sprint	Sarah Dixson						50
Individual sprint	Morgan Cropsey						52
Individual sprint	Sarah Johnson						54
Individual sprint	Cara Noseworthy						57
10 km pursuit	Gwynn Barrows					41:49.4	44
10 km pursuit	Marie Cartwright					42:00.3	45
10 km pursuit	Sarah Johnson					–	DNF
10 km pursuit	Sarah Dixson					–	DNF
10 km pursuit	Morgan Cropsey					–	DNF
10 km pursuit	Cara Noseworthy					–	DNS
3 x 5 km relay	Gwynn Barrows; Morgan Cropsey; Marie Cartwright					52:45.8	9

=== Mixed ===
Event	Athletes	Semifinals		Finals	
Event	Athletes	Time	Rank	Time	Rank
Mixed team sprint	Daniel Lewis; Gwynn Barrows	18:03.4	10	did not advance	
Mixed team sprint	Nathaniel Hough; Marie Cartwright	18:11.0	11	did not advance	

== Curling ==
The United States was represented by a men's curling team. The men's team did not qualify for the playoffs, finishing with a 4–5 win–loss record.

=== Men ===
- Skip: Blake Morton
- Third: Marcus Fonger
- Second: Tommy Juszczyk
- Lead: Calvin Weber
- Alternate: Tom Gabower

==== Standings ====
Country	W	L
South Korea	7	2
Great Britain	7	2
Switzerland	7	2
Czech Republic	7	3
Canada	6	4
Norway	4	5
United States	4	5
Sweden	3	6
Turkey	1	8
Slovenia	0	9

==== Round-robin results ====
Draw 1

Sheet D	1	2	3	4	5	6	7	8	9	10	Final
United States (Morton)	0	1	0	1	0	3	0	1	0	X	6
Switzerland (Hess) 🔨	2	0	2	0	1	0	3	0	4	X	12

Draw 2

Sheet C	1	2	3	4	5	6	7	8	9	10	Final
South Korea (Kim) 🔨	2	3	0	0	2	0	4	X	X	X	11
United States (Morton)	0	0	1	0	0	1	0	X	X	X	2

Draw 3

Sheet B	1	2	3	4	5	6	7	8	9	10	Final
Norway (Hoiberg) 🔨	0	0	1	0	0	2	0	2	0	0	5
United States (Morton)	0	1	0	0	1	0	2	0	1	1	6

Draw 4

Sheet E	1	2	3	4	5	6	7	8	9	10	Final
United States (Morton) 🔨	1	2	2	3	1	0	X	X	X	X	9
Sweden (Sundgren)	0	0	0	0	0	1	X	X	X	X	1

Draw 5

Sheet D	1	2	3	4	5	6	7	8	9	10	Final
Great Britain (Muirhead) 🔨	3	0	0	1	0	4	X	X	X	X	8
United States (Morton)	0	0	1	0	1	0	X	X	X	X	2

Draw 6

Sheet A	1	2	3	4	5	6	7	8	9	10	Final
Turkey (Dikmen)	0	1	1	0	2	0	1	0	0	X	5
United States (Morton) 🔨	2	0	0	3	0	3	0	0	1	X	9

Draw 7

Sheet C	1	2	3	4	5	6	7	8	9	10	Final
United States (Morton)	0	0	1	0	1	0	0	2	0	1	5
Canada (Beuk) 🔨	0	2	0	2	0	0	2	0	0	0	6

Draw 8

Sheet B	1	2	3	4	5	6	7	8	9	10	Final
United States (Morton)	0	0	0	0	1	0	2	0	0	1	4
Czech Republic (Klima) 🔨	0	1	0	3	0	0	0	1	0	0	5

Draw 9

Sheet A	1	2	3	4	5	6	7	8	9	10	Final
United States (Morton) 🔨	0	1	1	1	0	2	1	1	X	X	7
Slovenia (Lajovec)	0	0	0	0	1	0	0	0	X	X	1

== Ice hockey ==
The United States was represented by a men's and a women's team.

=== Men ===
The men's hockey team will compete in Group C.

==== Team roster ====
Following is the 2010-2011 United States Men's National University Team, which will be representing the United States in the ice hockey competition:

No.	Pos.	Name	Height	Weight	Birthdate	Birthplace	Year	2010-11 team
1	G	Erik Hudson	6 ft 2 in (188 cm)	219 lb (99 kg)	19 January 1987	Spokane, WA	Senior	Iowa State University
30	G	Dan Pyne	6 ft 0 in (183 cm)	205 lb (93 kg)	7 January 1990	Warrington, Pennsylvania	Junior	Drexel University
2	D	Mark Loecher	6 ft 1 in (185 cm)	215 lb (98 kg)	21 February 1990	Lancaster, NY	Junior	Mercyhurst College
3	D	Kevin Morrison	6 ft 0 in (183 cm)	185 lb (84 kg)	13 October 1989	Nesconset, NY	Senior	Niagara University
4	D	Dan Lassik	6 ft 3 in (191 cm)	207 lb (94 kg)	14 November 1988	Garnet Valley, PA	Junior	University of Rhode Island
5	D	Augie Hoffmann	6 ft 1 in (185 cm)	200 lb (91 kg)	28 January 1988	Lake Forest, IL	Sophomore	University of Oklahoma
6	D	Alan Dionne	5 ft 10 in (178 cm)	205 lb (93 kg)	21 December 1987	North Scituate, RI	Junior	University of Rhode Island
7	D	Jacob DeSano	5 ft 11 in (180 cm)	180 lb (82 kg)	21 July 1990	Washington Township, MI	Sophomore	Oakland University
9	D	Michael Lepre	5 ft 9 in (175 cm)	175 lb (79 kg)	1 September 1986	Kent, OH	Senior	Kent State University
8	F	Steve Balint	5 ft 11 in (180 cm)	173 lb (78 kg)	18 August 1986	Grosse Ile, MI	Senior	Lindenwood University
10	F	Tim O'Brien	6 ft 0 in (183 cm)	190 lb (86 kg)	12 May 1988	Bethel Park, PA	Senior	Penn State University
11	F	Kevin Kranker	5 ft 8 in (173 cm)	165 lb (75 kg)	30 November 1988	Lake Orion, MI	Senior	Oakland University
12	F	Michael Macari	6 ft 1 in (185 cm)	185 lb (84 kg)	13 October 1987	Dearborn Heights, MI	Junior	University of Michigan - Dearborn
15	F	Kyle Krannich	5 ft 8 in (173 cm)	160 lb (73 kg)	2 November 1988	Mendham, NJ	Senior	University of Rhode Island
16	F	Tom Ciaverilla	6 ft 0 in (183 cm)	190 lb (86 kg)	13 August 1988	Novi, MI	Junior	Adrian College
18	F	Grant Gorczyca	6 ft 1 in (185 cm)	205 lb (93 kg)	23 August 1988	Chesterfield, MO	Sophomore	Lindenwood University
21	F	Eric Steinour	6 ft 3 in (191 cm)	205 lb (93 kg)	31 March 1988	Carlisle, PA	Sophomore	Penn State University
22	F	Bob Collar	5 ft 11 in (180 cm)	180 lb (82 kg)	30 November 1985	Brighton, MI	Senior	Davenport University
23	F	James Telfer	6 ft 1 in (185 cm)	195 lb (88 kg)	3 October 1988	Ann Arbor, MI	Junior	Western Michigan University
24	F	Devin Sheehan	5 ft 10 in (178 cm)	185 lb (84 kg)	23 April 1988	Binghamton, NY	Senior	University of Rhode Island
25	F	Tyler Pilmore	6 ft 1 in (185 cm)	190 lb (86 kg)	20 March 1989	Sylvania, OH	Sophomore	Ohio University
A	G	Jason Spada	5 ft 10 in (178 cm)	185 lb (84 kg)	9 February 1988	Brighton, MI	Junior	Adrian College
A	D	Kevin Miller	6 ft 2 in (188 cm)	175 lb (79 kg)	27 October 1987	Pittsburgh, PA	Junior	Penn State University
A	D	Dan Petrick	6 ft 1 in (185 cm)	195 lb (88 kg)	13 April 1990	State College, PA	Junior	Penn State University
A (19)	F	Brandon Contratto	5 ft 9 in (175 cm)	165 lb (75 kg)	17 July 1990	West Bloomfield, MI	Junior	University of Michigan - Dearborn
A	F	Christopher Benz	5 ft 9 in (175 cm)	170 lb (77 kg)	7 July 1989	Glenview, IL	Senior	Indiana University
A	F	Jonathan Juliano	5 ft 11 in (180 cm)	190 lb (86 kg)	11 November 1986	Clinton Township, MI	Senior	Davenport University
A	F	Mike McBride	5 ft 11 in (180 cm)	175 lb (79 kg)	3 October 1987	Glenview, IL	Junior	University of Illinois

A - Alternate

==== Round-robin results ====
Team	GP	W	OTW	OTL	L	GF	GA	DIF	PTS
Kazakhstan	3	2	0	0	1	9	6	+3	6
Slovakia	3	2	0	0	1	17	10	+7	6
United States	3	2	0	0	1	11	9	+2	6
Spain	3	0	0	0	3	2	14	-12	0

January 28, 2011; 20:00	Kazakhstan	5 – 0 (2–0, 1–0, 2–0)	United States	3000 Ice Rink, Erzurum

Game reference

January 30, 2011; 16:00	Slovakia	3 – 7 (2–4, 1–2, 0–1)	United States	3000 Ice Rink, Erzurum

Game reference

February 1, 2011; 16:00	United States	4 – 1 (0–0, 0–0, 4–1)	Spain	3000 Ice Rink, Erzurum

Game reference

==== Quarterfinals ====
February 3, 2011	Belarus	6 – 3 (1–1, 2–2, 3–0)	United States	500 Ice Rink, Erzurum

Game reference

=== Women ===
==== Team roster ====
Following is the 2011 United States Women's National University Team, which will be representing the United States in the ice hockey competition:

No.	Pos.	Name	Height	Weight	Birthdate	Birthplace	Year	2010-11 team
1	G	Katie Vaughn	5 ft 6 in (168 cm)	120 lb (54 kg)	27 September 1992	Pittsburgh, PA	Freshman	Penn State University
30	G	Heather Rossi	5 ft 6 in (168 cm)	160 lb (73 kg)	29 April 1988	Kunkletown, PA	Senior	Penn State University
3	D	Shea Crawford	5 ft 5 in (165 cm)	140 lb (64 kg)	30 April 1988	Selbyville, DE	Senior	Lindenwood University
4	D	Megan Winters	5 ft 10 in (178 cm)	150 lb (68 kg)	1 September 1990	Basking Ridge, NJ	Sophomore	Northeastern University
5	D	Christina Young	5 ft 5 in (165 cm)	168 lb (76 kg)	30 May 1989	Stafford, VA	Senior	Michigan State University
6	D	Lindsay Reihl	5 ft 7 in (170 cm)	135 lb (61 kg)	23 September 1991	Cheshire, CT	Sophomore	Penn State University
7	D	Becky Katz	5 ft 6 in (168 cm)	145 lb (66 kg)	24 November 1990	Cambridge, MN	Sophomore	Robert Morris University (Illinois)
8	D	Nicole Konsdorf	5 ft 4 in (163 cm)	130 lb (59 kg)	18 June 1989	Freeland, MI	Junior	Lindenwood University
9	D	Rachel Black	5 ft 3 in (160 cm)	130 lb (59 kg)	9 May 1989	Redwood City, CA	Junior	Robert Morris University (Illinois)
10	F	Denise Rohlik	5 ft 5 in (165 cm)	130 lb (59 kg)	5 May 1990	Raleigh, NC	Junior	Penn State University
11	F	Erica Wynn	5 ft 10 in (178 cm)	130 lb (59 kg)	31 March 1991	Anchorage, AK	Sophomore	Lindenwood University
12	F	Justine Ducie	5 ft 6 in (168 cm)	135 lb (61 kg)	29 June 1989	Sandwich, MA	Senior	University of Rhode Island
14	F	Terra Payne	5 ft 5 in (165 cm)	150 lb (68 kg)	14 September 1988	Gaylord, MI	Senior	Michigan State University
15	F	Emily Nelson	5 ft 4 in (163 cm)	160 lb (73 kg)	8 September 1989	Harper Woods, MI	Senior	University of Michigan
16	F	Allysson Arcibal	5 ft 4 in (163 cm)	160 lb (73 kg)	13 March 1992	Vista, CA	Freshman	Lindenwood University
17	F	Tiffany Juha	5 ft 2 in (157 cm)	130 lb (59 kg)	11 April 1988	Cape Coral, FL	Senior	California University of Pennsylvania
18	F	Samantha Redick	5 ft 7 in (170 cm)	145 lb (66 kg)	20 February 1992	Anchorage, AK	Freshman	Lindenwood University
19	F	Ramey Weaver	5 ft 2 in (157 cm)	135 lb (61 kg)	14 October 1989	Eagle River, AK	Junior	Robert Morris University (Illinois)
20	F	Chelsea Minnie	5 ft 6 in (168 cm)	140 lb (64 kg)	24 March 1992	St. Clair, MI	Freshman	Grand Valley State University
21	F	Ashley Rumsey	5 ft 8 in (173 cm)	160 lb (73 kg)	28 September 1988	West Olive, MI	Senior	Grand Valley State University
23	F	Shelby Kucharski	5 ft 2 in (157 cm)	130 lb (59 kg)	31 May 1991	Livonia, MI	Sophomore	Grand Valley State University
25	F	Charlotte Hoium	5 ft 7 in (170 cm)	140 lb (64 kg)	10 June 1990	Falcon Heights, MN	Junior	Michigan State University
A	G	Michelle Wyniemko	5 ft 4 in (163 cm)	113 lb (51 kg)	21 November 1990	Westland, MI	Junior	Grand Valley State University
A	D	Kate Christofferson	5 ft 3 in (160 cm)	130 lb (59 kg)	11 January 1991	Trumbull, CT	Sophomore	Penn State University
A	D	Sarah Jensen	5 ft 4 in (163 cm)	150 lb (68 kg)	26 November 1988	Albert Lea, MN	Senior	South Dakota State University
A	F	Kayleigh Bowers	5 ft 6 in (168 cm)	145 lb (66 kg)	11 January 1990	Fort Worth, TX	Junior	Michigan State University
A	F	Alex Kann	5 ft 3 in (160 cm)	135 lb (61 kg)	16 October 1991	Phoenix, AZ	Freshman	Michigan State University
A	F	Joslyn Neal	5 ft 8 in (173 cm)	135 lb (61 kg)	2 August 1989	Harrison Township, MI	Senior	University of Michigan

A - Alternate

==== Round-robin results ====
Team	GP	W	OTW	OTL	L	GF	GA	DIF	PTS
Canada	5	4	1	0	0	39	1	+38	14
Finland	5	4	0	1	0	49	3	+46	13
Slovakia	5	3	0	0	2	33	11	+22	9
United States	5	2	0	0	3	25	18	+7	6
Great Britain	5	1	0	0	4	11	36	-25	3
Turkey	5	0	0	0	5	0	88	-88	0

January 27, 2011; 9:30	United States	1 – 5 (0–2, 1–1, 0–2)	Slovakia	500 Ice Rink, Erzurum

Game reference

January 28, 2011; 11:00	United States	15 – 0 (8–0, 5–0, 2–0)	Turkey	500 Ice Rink, Erzurum

Game reference

January 30, 2011; 15:00	Finland	3 – 1 (0–0, 2–0, 1–1)	United States	500 Ice Rink, Erzurum

Game reference

January 31, 2010; 11:00	United States	0 – 9 (0–3, 0–4, 0–2)	Canada	500 Ice Rink, Erzurum

Game reference

February 2, 2011; 12:30	Great Britain	1 – 8 (0–2, 1–3, 0–3)	United States	3000 Ice Rink, Erzurum

Game reference

==== Semifinals ====
February 4, 2011; 20:00	Canada	8 – 1 (2–1, 3–0, 3–0)	United States	3000 Ice Rink, Erzurum

Game reference

==== Bronze Medal Game ====
February 5, 2011; 9:30	Slovakia	3 – 1 (1–0, 0–0, 2–1)	United States	3000 Ice Rink, Erzurum

Game reference

== Snowboarding ==
The US Snowboarding team consists of 3 athletes:

- Austen Butler
- Samuel Raine
- David Wallace

=== Men ===
Men's snowboard cross

Athletes	Qualification			1/8 finals	Quarterfinals	Semifinals	Finals	
Athletes	Run 1	Run 2	Rank	Position	Position	Position	Position	Rank
Samuel Raine	51.87	51.87	35	did not advance				
Austen Butler	52.44	52.02	39	did not advance				
David Wallace	53.78	52.96	42	did not advance				

Men's parallel giant slalom

Athletes	Qualification		Elimination		1/8 finals	Quarterfinals	Semifinals	Finals	
Athletes	Time	Rank	Time	Rank	Opposition margin	Opposition margin	Opposition margin	Opposition margin	Rank
Samuel Raine	43.87	17 Red	did not advance						
David Wallace	52.30	23 Blue	did not advance						

Men's halfpipe

Athlete	Qualification			Semifinals			Finals	
Athlete	Run 1	Run 2	Rank	Run 1	Run 2	Rank	Run	Rank
Austen Butler	14.5	5.6	17 q	11.7	8.2	12	did not advance	

Men's slopestyle

Athlete	Qualification			Finals		
Athlete	Run 1	Run 2	Rank	Run 1	Run 2	Rank
David Wallace	Event not held					
