= Calle Lindh =

Swedish alpine skier (born 1990)

Personal information
- Born: 10 March 1990 (age 36)

Skiing career
- Sport: Alpine skiing

Calle Lindh (born 10 March 1990) is a Swedish alpine ski racer.

He competed at the 2015 World Championships in Beaver Creek, USA, in the giant slalom race, in which he crashed out of the second run.
