= Alicia Martin =

Paraguayan former model, actress and singer

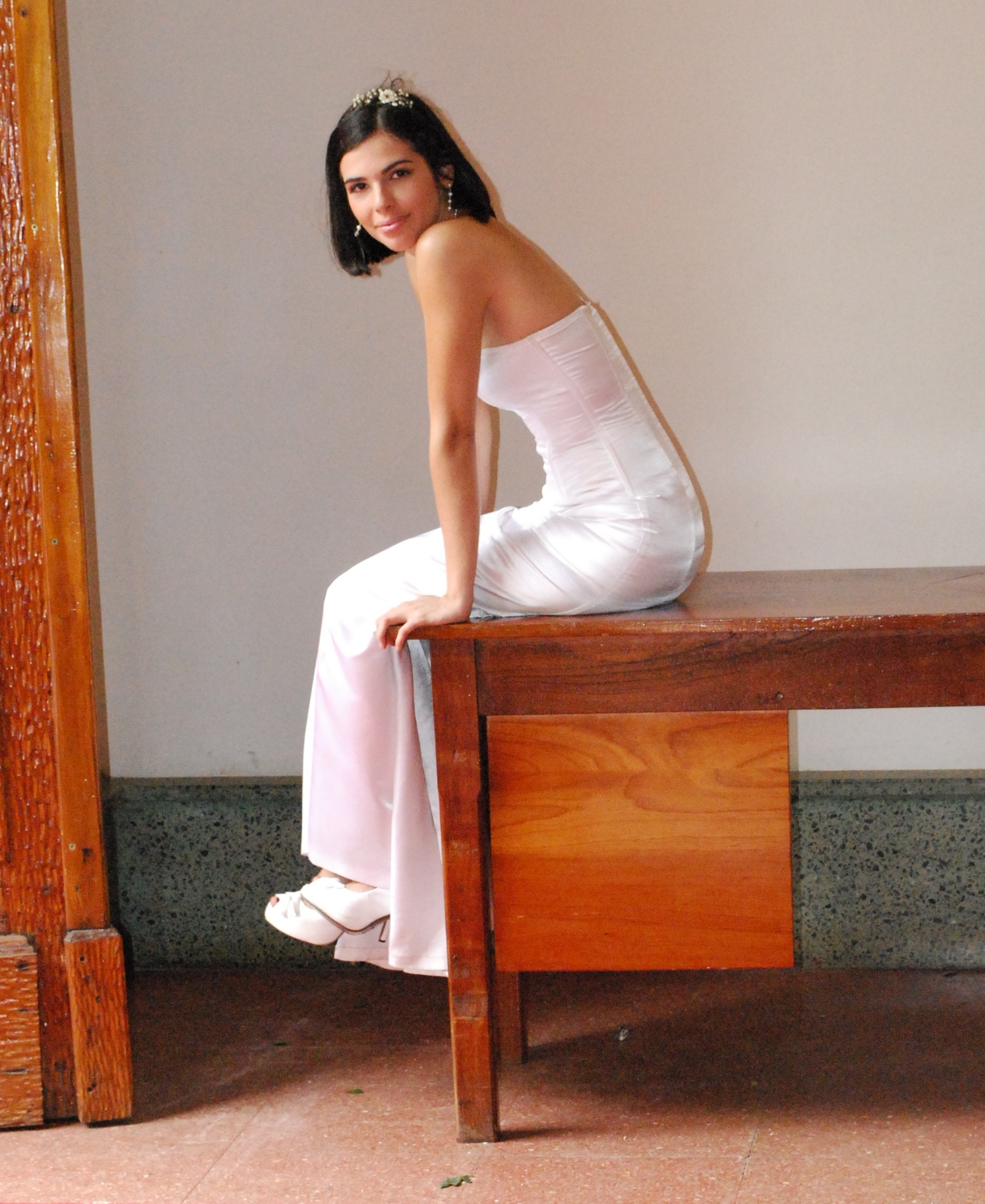
Alicia Martin

Alicia Martin (born in Asunción) is a Paraguayan former model, actress and singer.

== Career ==
Martin began her career as a model and started appearing in television shows such as Extra Fashion, Paraguay Extremo and El Tajo. In 2008 she won the role of Andrea in the telenovela Papá del corazón with Paola Maltese. In 2009 she played Elba in De mil amores. In 2008, Alicia appeared in the film El Regalo de Sofia and in Semana Capital in 2010.
