= Kafkas University =

Public university in Kars, Turkey

- Kafkas Üniversitesi
- Type: Public
- Established: July 11, 1992
- Rector: Sami Özcan
- Students: 40,000
- Location: Kars, Turkey; 40°35′04.2″N 43°04′17.6″E
- Website: www.kafkas.edu.tr

Kafkas University (Turkish: Kafkas Üniversitesi) is a public higher educational institution established on July 11, 1992, in Kars, Eastern Anatolia in Turkey. It has six faculties, three institutes, three colleges, four vocational colleges and several research and application centers. The university campus is situated 3.5 km (2.2 mi) southwest of Kars.

== History ==
Kafkas University was established on July 11, 1992, by Law No. 3837. The university, which started its activities with the appointment of its Founding Rector in November 1992, had one faculty transferred from Atatürk University and a single-program vocational school, with 245 students and 40 teaching staff at the time of its establishment. Prof. Dr. Hüsnü Kapu was appointed as rector in 2018.

== Academic units ==
Faculties

- Veterinary
- Science and Letters
- Economics, Business Administration, Political science and public administration
- Education
- Medicine
- Dentistry
- Engineering and Architecture

Institutes

- Sciences
- Health Sciences
- Social Sciences

Colleges

- Sarıkamış Physical Education and Sports
- Kars Health Sciences
- Foreign Languages

Vocational colleges (VC)

- Kars VC
- Kağızman VC
- Sarıkamış VC
- Atatürk Health Services VC
- Social Sciences VC

Research and application centers

- Atatürk's Thoughts and Reforms, History Research and Application Center
- Livestock Research and Application Center
- Caucasus and Central Asia Research Center
- Strategic Research Center
- Continuous Education Research and Application Center
- Health Research and Application Center
- Disabled Problems Research and Application Center
- Women Problems Research and Application Center
- Turkish Anthropology Research and Application Center

=== Collaboration and MoU with foreign universities and institutes ===
- Islamic University, Bangladesh (MoU)

== Affiliations ==
The university is a member of the Caucasus University Association.
