= Dilimli Dam =

- Location within Turkey
- Official name: Dilimli Baraji
- Country: Turkey
- Location: Yüksekova
- Coordinates: 37°37′12″N 44°21′46″E
- Status: Operational
- Construction began: 1995
- Opening date: 2014
- Construction cost: US$ 41.7 million
- Owner: Turkish State Hydraulic Works

Dam and spillways
- Type of dam: Embankment, rock-fill clay-core
- Impounds: Büyük River
- Height: 93 m (305 ft)
- Height (thalweg): 70 m (230 ft)
- Length: 347 m (1,138 ft)
- Dam volume: 2,241,000 m^{3} (2,931,117 cu yd)

Reservoir
- Total capacity: 62,880,000 m^{3} (50,978 acre⋅ft)
- Surface area: 2.42 km^{2} (1 mi^{2})

The Dilimli Dam is a rock-fill embankment dam on the Büyük River, located 9 km (6 mi) northeast of Yüksekova in Hakkari Province, Turkey. Construction on the project began in 1995 after the main contract was awarded in 1994. Development is backed by the Turkish State Hydraulic Works. It was completed in late November 2014. The mayor of Dilimli opposes the dam because of its effects on nature. The primary purpose of the dam is water supply and it will divert water into a 505 m (1,657 ft) long tunnel for the irrigation of 9,142 ha (22,590 acres).

== See also ==
- List of dams and reservoirs in Turkey
