= Ağrı İbrahim Çeçen University =

Public university in Ağrı, Turkey

Coordinates: 39.7178°N 43.0271°E

- Former name: Ağrı Dağı University
- Motto in English: To Search, To Discover, To Serve
- Type: Public
- Established: May 29, 2007
- Rector: Prof. Dr. İlhami Gülçin
- Academic staff: 523 (2021-22)
- Students: 3,470 (2021-22)
- Undergraduates: 8,290 (2021-22)
- Postgraduates: 811 (2021-22)
- Location: Ağrı, Turkey

Ağrı İbrahim Çeçen University (Turkish: Ağrı İbrahim Çeçen Üniversitesi, ICUA) is a public higher educational institution located in Ağrı, Eastern Anatolia in Turkey. It was formerly the Faculty of Education linked to the Atatürk University of Erzurum.

In 2007, the facility was developed to a university named Ağrı Dağı University (Turkish for Mount Ararat University). The university was later renamed following a protocol signed between the government and a local businessman and philanthropist İbrahim Çeçen.

The university has six faculties, two institutes, five colleges, five vocational schools and five research and application centers.

The university is a member of the Caucasus University Association.

According to the Presidential decree published in the Resmî Gazette on April 9, 2025, Prof. Dr. İlhami Gülçin was appointed as the Rector of Ağrı İbrahim Çeçen University.

== History ==
The opening of the university was on 27 May 2007 as Ağrı Dağı University. On 28 June 2008, the university was renamed after its refounder – İbrahim Çeçen

As a civil engineer and businessman his name was given to the university and its name was changed to Ağrı İbrahim Çeçen University (ICUA). Deputy rector was Prof. Dr. Yaşar SÜtbeyaz then Prof. Dr. Irfan ASLAN was appointed as the first rector in 2008.

At the start, the university had only one faculty – the faculty of Education. The board of professors and lecturers numbered 18, and the student body was 1200. Today the number of professors involved in teaching and training is around 300, including 59 academicians and 259 corresponding members of the academy, and nine thousand students pursue their degrees at 12 regional branches of the university.

== ICUA today ==
Today ICUA is the 4th largest university in Eastern Anatolia. It has two campuses, one central laboratory for scientific-research and study-scientific institutes, four scientific-research laboratories and centers, 12 study laboratories and rooms, and two libraries.

== ICUA schools ==
Schools at ICUA are the School of The Vocational School, Faculty of Science and Letters, Faculty of Education, Faculty of Economics and Administrative Sciences, Vocational Health School.

== Teaching and working language ==
Turkish is the official language of Turkey. Beyond Turkish boundaries, the language is widespread in Azerbaijan, Iran, Germany, Turkhmenistan, Armenia and Georgia. It is important for foreign residents of Turkey to study the Turkish Language to communicate and integrate into the Turkish society. Regarding the students, Turkish is the working language at Agri Ibrahim Cecen University-that means it is necessary for the students to know the language to achieve their academic goals. There is a language center that provides language education to students. The instructors of the Turkish Second Language (TSL) center are also proficient in English and Russian languages.

== Research centers ==
Ağrı İbrahim Çeçen University Historical Artifacts and Cultural-Nature Values Research and Application Center

== International conferences ==
ICUA is the main host of scholarly international conferences related to Noah’s Ark in Eastern Anatolia. There were international symposia on Noah’s Ark and Mount Ağrı I and II, in 2010 and 2011.

== Academic units ==
=== Faculties ===
- Faculty of Education
- Faculty of Science and Letters
- Faculty of Economics and Administrative Sciences
- Faculty of Islamic Sciences
- Faculty of Pharmacy
- Patnos Sultan Alpaslan Engineering and Natural Sciences Faculty

=== Institutes ===
- Institute of Sciences
- Institute of Social Sciences

=== High schools ===
- School of Health
- Eleşkirt Celal Oruç Animal Breeding School
- School of Physical Education and Sports
- School of Tourism and Hotel Management
- School of Foreign Languages

=== Vocational schools ===
- Vocational School of Health Services
- Doğubeyazıt Ahmed-i Hani Vocational School
- Patnos Vocational School
- Taşlıçay Nurali Turan vocational School
- Eleşkirt Vocational School

=== Research and application centers ===
- Continuing Education Center
- Central Research and Application Laboratory
- Ahmed-i Hani Science, Culture and Art Center
- The Research, Development, Application Center of Husbandry
- The Research and Application Center of Historical Artifacts and Cultural Values of Nature
- The Research and Application Center of Computer Sciences

== Campuses ==
There are two campuses located in Ağrı.

- East campus is near city center and includes health related schools.
- Main campus (West) is located on side of highway to Erzurum.
